= 2016–17 Top 14 season =

French Rugby Championship

2016–17 Top 14
- Countries: France
- Date: 20 August 2016 – 4 June 2017
- Champions: Clermont (2nd title)
- Runners-up: Toulon
- Relegated: Bayonne, Grenoble
- Matches played: 187
- Attendance: 2,715,497 (average 14,521 per match)
- Highest attendance: 79,771 (play-offs); Clermont v Toulon; 4 June 2017; 51,672 (league stage); Toulon v Toulouse; 9 April 2016
- Lowest attendance: 5,000; Stade Français v Grenoble; 20 August 2016
- Top point scorer: (France) Gaëtan Germain (Brive); 324 points
- Top try scorer: (Fiji) Waisea Nayacalevu (Stade Français); 14 tries

Official website
- www.lnr.fr

The 2016–17 Top 14 competition was the 118th French domestic rugby union club competition operated by the Ligue Nationale de Rugby (LNR). Two new teams from the 2015–16 Pro D2 season were promoted to Top 14 this year, Bayonne and Lyon in place of the two relegated teams, Agen and Oyonnax. It marked the first time that both promoted teams had returned on their first opportunity after relegation (Bayonne and Lyon were both relegated during the 2014–15 Top 14 season).

== Teams ==
Locations of the 2016–17 Top 14 teams

Club	City (department)	Stadium	Capacity
Bayonne	Bayonne (Pyrénées-Atlantiques)	Stade Jean Dauger	16,934
Bordeaux Bègles	Bordeaux (Gironde)	Stade Chaban-Delmas (Bordeaux)	34,694
Brive	Brive-la-Gaillarde (Corrèze)	Stade Amédée-Domenech	13,979 (Note: Brive's stadium capacity was reduced down to 13,979, compared with 16,000 from the previous season.)
Castres	Castres (Tarn)	Stade Pierre-Antoine	11,500
Clermont	Clermont-Ferrand (Puy-de-Dôme)	Stade Marcel-Michelin	19,022
Grenoble	Grenoble (Isère)	Stade des Alpes (Note: Grenoble's traditional home is Stade Lesdiguières; however, beginning in 2012–13, they moved high-demand home matches to the larger Stade des Alpes. Starting in 2014–15, they became the primary tenants of Stade des Alpes.)	20,068
La Rochelle	La Rochelle (Charente-Maritime)	Stade Marcel-Deflandre	15,000
Lyon	Lyon (Rhône)	Matmut Stadium de Gerland; Matmut Stadium	25,000; 11,805
Montpellier	Montpellier (Hérault)	Altrad Stadium	15,697 (Note: Montpellier's stadium capacity was expanded up to 15,697 from 14,700 the previous season.)
Pau	Pau (Pyrénées-Atlantiques)	Stade du Hameau	18,000 (Note: Pau's stadium capacity was expanded up to 18,000 from 13,800 the previous season.)
Racing 92	Colombes (Hauts-de-Seine)	Stade Olympique Yves-du-Manoir (Note: In recent years, Racing has taken occasional home matches to Stade de France, MMArena in Le Mans, and Stade Océane in Le Havre.)	14,000
Stade Français	Paris, 16th arrondissement	Stade Jean-Bouin	20,000
Toulon	Toulon (Var)	Stade Mayol (Note: In recent years, Toulon has taken occasional home matches to Stade Vélodrome in Marseille and Allianz Riviera in Nice.)	15,820 (Note: Toulon's stadium capacity was expanded up to 15,820 from 15,400 the previous season. This capacity was exceeded in Toulon's fixture against Bayonne on 11 March 2017 when 16,049 attended so it is not clear if the stadium increased in size during the season or if temporary seats were installed for this game alone.)
Toulouse	Toulouse (Haute-Garonne)	Stade Ernest-Wallon (Note: Toulouse often takes high-demand home matches to the city's largest sporting venue, Stadium Municipal.)	19,500

== Competition format ==
The top six teams at the end of the regular season (after all the teams played one another twice, once at home, once away) enter a knockout stage to decide the Champions of France. This consists of three rounds: the teams finishing third to sixth in the table play quarter-finals (hosted by the third and fourth placed teams). The winners then face the top two teams in the semi-finals, with the winners meeting in the final at the Stade de France in Saint-Denis.

The LNR uses a slightly different bonus points system from that used in most other rugby competitions. It trialled a new system in 2007–08 explicitly designed to prevent a losing team from earning more than one bonus point in a match, a system that also made it impossible for either team to earn a bonus point in a drawn match. LNR chose to continue with this system for subsequent seasons.

France's bonus point system operates as follows:

- 4 points for a win.
- 2 points for a draw.
- 1 bonus point for winning while scoring at least 3 more tries than the opponent. This replaces the standard bonus point for scoring 4 tries regardless of the match result.
- 1 bonus point for losing by 5 points (or fewer). The margin had been 7 points until being changed prior to the 2014–15 season.

== Table ==
2016–17 Top 14 Table
	Club	Played	Won	Drawn	Lost	Points For	Points Against	Points Diff.	Try Bonus	Losing Bonus	Points
1	La Rochelle (SF)	26	17	3	6	707	498	+209	6	5	85
2	Clermont (C)	26	15	3	8	800	562	+238	8	4	78
3	Montpellier (QF)	26	16	0	10	750	564	+186	7	5	76
4	Toulon (RU)	26	14	2	10	674	511	+163	3	6	69
5	Castres (QF)	26	13	1	12	667	509	+158	5	4	63
6	Racing (SF)	26	14	1	11	586	616	–30	3	1	62
7	Stade Français (CC)	26	12	1	13	643	638	+5	5	4	59
8	Brive	26	13	1	12	577	634	–57	0	4	58
9	Pau	26	12	1	13	604	701	–97	2	5	57
10	Lyon	26	11	2	13	573	632	–59	3	4	55
11	Bordeaux Bègles	26	11	1	14	569	581	–12	2	6	54
12	Toulouse	26	11	0	15	537	561	–24	3	6	53
13	Grenoble (R)	26	7	1	18	611	852	–241	2	6	38
14	Bayonne (R)	26	6	3	17	466	905	–439	0	0	30
If teams are level at any stage, tiebreakers are applied in the following order: 1. Competition points earned in head-to-head matches 2. Points difference in head-to-head matches 3. Try differential in head-to-head matches 4. Points difference in all matches 5. Try differential in all matches 6. Points scored in all matches 7. Tries scored in all matches 8. Fewer matches forfeited 9. Classification in the previous Top 14 season
Green background (rows 1 and 2) receive semi-final play-off places and receive berths in the 2016–17 European Rugby Champions Cup. Blue background (rows 3 to 6) receive quarter-final play-off places, and receive berths in the Champions Cup. Yellow background (row 7) receive a berth for the 2017–18 European Rugby Champions–Challenge Cup play-offs. Plain background indicates teams that earn a place in the 2017–18 European Rugby Challenge Cup. Pink background (row 13) will be contest a play-off with the runners-up of the 2016–17 Rugby Pro D2 season for a place in the 2017–18 Top 14 season. Red background (row 14) will be relegated to Rugby Pro D2. Final table

== Relegation ==
Normally, the teams that finish in 13th and 14th places in the table are relegated to Pro D2 at the end of the season. In certain circumstances, "financial reasons" may cause a higher placed team to be demoted instead. This last happened at the end of the 2009–10 season when 12th place Montauban were relegated thereby reprieving 13th place Bayonne.

== Fixtures and results ==
=== Round 1 ===
20 August 2016
20:45

(1 BP) Stade Français	54–20	Grenoble
	Report

Stade Jean-Bouin
Attendance: 5,000
Referee: Laurent Cardona

20 August 2016
20:45

Lyon	15–15	Brive
	Report

Matmut Stadium
Attendance: 8,385
Referee: Thomas Charabas

20 August 2016
20:45

Toulouse	20–12	Montpellier
	Report

Stade Ernest-Wallon
Attendance: 12,400
Referee: Mathieu Raynal

20 August 2016
20:45

Bordeaux Bègles	15–9	Racing
	Report

Stade Chaban-Delmas
Attendance: 22,771
Referee: Pascal Gaüzère

20 August 2016
20:45

Castres	28–11	Pau
	Report

Stade Pierre-Antoine
Attendance: 8,103
Referee: Sébastien Minery

20 August 2016
20:45

La Rochelle	30–30	Clermont
	Report

Stade Marcel-Deflandre
Attendance: 15,000
Referee: Adrien Descottes

21 August 2016
18:15

Bayonne	28–23	Toulon (1 BP)
	Report

Stade Jean Dauger
Attendance: 16,933
Referee: Salem Attalah

=== Round 2 ===
27 August 2016
14:45

(1 BP) Pau	18–22	Toulon
	Report

Stade du Hameau
Attendance: 11,000
Referee: Mathieu Raynal

27 August 2016
18:30

(1 BP) Grenoble	19–22	La Rochelle
	Report

Stade des Alpes
Attendance: 11,500
Referee: Tual Trainini

27 August 2016
18:30

(1 BP) Racing	29–16	Lyon
	Report

Stade Olympique Yves-du-Manoir
Attendance: 6,833
Referee: Pierre Brousset

27 August 2016
18:30

Bayonne	12–12	Castres
	Report

Stade Jean Dauger
Attendance: 12,800
Referee: Maxime Chalon

27 August 2016
18:30

Brive	28–20	Stade Français
	Report

Stade Amédée-Domenech
Attendance: 10,098
Referee: Cédric Marchat

27 August 2016
20:45

Toulouse	22–17	Bordeaux Bègles (1 BP)
	Report

Stade Ernest-Wallon
Attendance: 12,356
Referee: Alexandre Ruiz

28 August 2016
16:15

(1 BP) Montpellier	22–26	Clermont
	Report

Altrad Stadium
Attendance: 11,784
Referee: Pascal Gaüzère

=== Round 3 ===
3 September 2016
14:45

Stade Français	30–30	Clermont
	Report

Stade Jean-Bouin
Attendance: 15,538
Referee: Mathieu Raynal

3 September 2016
18:30

(1 BP) Pau	25–9	Bayonne
	Report

Stade du Hameau
Attendance: 11,000
Referee: Laurent Cardona

3 September 2016
18:30

(1 BP) Lyon	32–13	Grenoble
	Report

Matmut Stadium
Attendance: 10,827
Referee: Cédric Marchat

3 September 2016
18:30

Castres	18–26	La Rochelle
	Report

Stade Pierre-Antoine
Attendance: 7,903
Referee: Pascal Gaüzère

3 September 2016
18:30

(1 BP) Toulon	21–25	Brive
	Report

Stade Mayol
Attendance: 12,676
Referee: Alexandre Ruiz

4 September 2016
16:15

Bordeaux Bègles	15–32	Montpellier
	Report

Stade Chaban-Delmas
Attendance: 20,306
Referee: Jérôme Garcès

4 September 2016
21:00

Racing	28–14	Toulouse
	Report

Stade Olympique Yves-du-Manoir
Attendance: 8,265
Referee: Salem Attalah

=== Round 4 ===
10 September 2016
14:45

Stade Français	29–25	Castres (1 BP)
	Report

Stade Jean-Bouin
Attendance: 8,596
Referee: Thomas Charabas

10 September 2016
18:30

(1 BP) Montpellier	41–13	Pau
	Report

Altrad Stadium
Attendance: 9,093
Referee: Pierre Brousset

10 September 2016
18:30

(1 BP) La Rochelle	43–18	Lyon
	Report

Stade Marcel-Deflandre
Attendance: 15,000
Referee: Maxime Chalon

10 September 2016
18:30

(1 BP) Bordeaux Bègles	40–20	Bayonne
	Report

Stade Chaban-Delmas
Attendance: 25,410
Referee: Adrien Descottes

10 September 2016
20:45

(1 BP) Clermont	47–10	Racing
	Report

Stade Marcel-Michelin
Attendance: 17,674
Referee: Romain Poite

11 September 2016
12:30

Grenoble	36–23	Brive
	Report

Stade des Alpes
Attendance: 9,000
Referee: Sébastien Minery

11 September 2016
16:15

Toulouse	15–32	Toulon (1 BP)
	Report

Stade Ernest-Wallon
Attendance: 18,839
Referee: Jérôme Garcès

=== Round 5 ===
17 September 2016
14:45

Lyon	25–20	Toulouse (1 BP)
	Report

Matmut Stadium
Attendance: 10,316
Referee: Tual Trainini

17 September 2016
18:30

Bayonne	9–21	Montpellier
	Report

Stade Jean Dauger
Attendance: 11,425
Referee: Cédric Marchat

17 September 2016
18:30

Pau	23–6	Stade Français
	Report

Stade du Hameau
Attendance: 11,000
Referee: Romain Poite

17 September 2016
18:30

Brive	29–28	La Rochelle (1 BP)
	Report

Stade Amédée-Domenech
Attendance: 10,193
Referee: Mathieu Raynal

17 September 2016
20:45

(1 BP) Clermont	40–16	Bordeaux Bègles
	Report

Stade Marcel-Michelin
Attendance: 15,500
Referee: Salem Attalah

18 September 2016
12:30

(1 BP) Castres	46–9	Grenoble
	Report

Stade Pierre-Antoine
Attendance: 8,034
Referee: Adrien Descottes

18 September 2016
16:15

(1 BP) Racing	41–30	Toulon
	Report

Stade Olympique Yves-du-Manoir
Attendance: 11,052
Referee: Maxime Chalon

=== Round 6 ===
24 September 2016
14:45

Castres	31–23	Racing
	Report

Stade Pierre-Antoine
Attendance: 8,845
Referee: Jérôme Garcès

24 September 2016
18:30

(1 BP) Bordeaux Bègles	32–10	Lyon
	Report

Stade Chaban-Delmas
Attendance: 18,564
Referee: Sébastien Minery

24 September 2016
18:30

(1 BP) Grenoble	38–39	Pau
	Report

Stade des Alpes
Attendance: 11,000
Referee: Thomas Charabas

24 September 2016
18:30

(1 BP) La Rochelle	34–17	Bayonne
	Report

Stade Marcel-Deflandre
Attendance: 15,000
Referee: Pierre Brousset

24 September 2016
20:45

Toulouse	23–18	Stade Français (1 BP)
	Report

Stade Ernest-Wallon
Attendance: 12,889
Referee: Alexandre Ruiz

25 September 2016
12:30

(1 BP) Montpellier	42–13	Brive
	Report

Altrad Stadium
Attendance: 10,417
Referee: Laurent Cardona

25 September 2016
16:15

Toulon	23–21	Clermont (1 BP)
	Report

Stade Mayol
Attendance: 14,290
Referee: Pascal Gaüzère

=== Round 7 ===
1 October 2016
14:45

Clermont	29–19	Castres
	Report

Stade Marcel-Michelin
Attendance: 15,500
Referee: Tual Trainini

1 October 2016
18:30

(1 BP) Pau	28–30	Bordeaux Bègles
	Report

Stade du Hameau
Attendance: 10,521
Referee: Cédric Marchat

1 October 2016
18:30

Bayonne	22–22	Lyon
	Report

Stade Jean Dauger
Attendance: 10,200
Referee: Mathieu Raynal

1 October 2016
18:30

(1 BP) Toulouse	31–3	Grenoble
	Report

Stade Ernest-Wallon
Attendance: 10,034
Referee: Jérôme Garcès

1 October 2016
20:45

Brive	25–16	Racing
	Report

Stade Amédée Domenech
Attendance: 10,526
Referee: Thomas Charabas

2 October 2016
12:30

Stade Français	31–26	La Rochelle (1 BP)
	Report

Stade Jean Bouin
Attendance: 10,222
Referee: Pascal Gaüzère

2 October 2016
16:15

(1 BP) Toulon	28–6	Montpellier
	Report

Stade Vélodrome
Attendance: 38,012
Referee: Salem Attalah

=== Round 8 ===
8 October 2016
14:45

Racing	29–22	Stade Français
	Report

Stade Yves du Manoir
Attendance: 11,465
Referee: Laurent Cardona

8 October 2016
18:30

Montpellier	28–19	Castres
	Report

Altrad Stadium
Attendance: 10,000
Referee: Sébastien Minery

8 October 2016
18:30

Bordeaux Bègles	27–25	Brive (1 BP)
	Report

Stade Chaban-Delmas
Attendance: 23,403
Referee: Pierre Brousset

8 October 2016
18:30

(1 BP) Grenoble	44–16	Bayonne
	Report

Stade des Alpes
Attendance: 13,000
Referee: Maxime Chalon

8 October 2016
20:45

La Rochelle	17–17	Toulon
	Report

Stade Marcel-Deflandre
Attendance: 15,000
Referee: Alexandre Ruiz

9 October 2016
12:30

Lyon	27–22	Pau (1 BP)
	Report

Matmut Stadium
Attendance: 9,787
Referee: Adrien Descottes

9 October 2016
16:15

Clermont	29–25	Toulouse (1 BP)
	Report

Stade Marcel-Michelin
Attendance: 18,697
Referee: Romain Poite

=== Round 9 ===
29 October 2016
14:45

(1 BP) Pau	20–24	Toulouse
	Report

Stade du Hameau
Attendance: 11,000
Referee: Thomas Charabas

29 October 2016
18:30

Stade Français	25–19	Lyon
	Report

Stade Jean Bouin
Attendance: 8,788
Referee: Cédric Marchat

29 October 2016
18:30

Montpellier	12–11	La Rochelle (1 BP)
	Report

Altrad Stadium
Attendance: 11,000
Referee: Maxime Chalon

29 October 2016
18:30

(1 BP) Toulon	42–12	Grenoble
	Report

Stade Mayol
Attendance: 15,507
Referee: Pierre Brousset

29 October 2016
20:45

Bayonne	3–16	Racing
	Report

Stade Jean Dauger
Attendance: 13,930
Referee: Romain Poite

30 October 2016
12:30

Castres	33–27	Bordeaux Bègles
	Report

Stade Pierre-Antoine
Attendance: 8,710
Referee: Alexandre Ruiz

30 October 2016
16:15

Brive	16–40	Clermont (1 BP)
	Report

Stade Amédée Domenech
Attendance: 13,979
Referee: Pascal Gaüzère

=== Round 10 ===
5 November 2016
14:45

Bordeaux Bègles	37–19	Stade Français
	Report

Stade Chaban-Delmas
Attendance: 24,473
Referee: Thomas Charabas

5 November 2016
18:30

Toulouse	16–15	Castres (1 BP)
	Report

Stade Ernest-Wallon
Attendance: 14,417
Referee: Pascal Gaüzère

5 November 2016
18:30

Brive	26–9	Bayonne
	Report

Stade Amédée-Domenech
Attendance: 8,979
Referee: Adrien Descottes

5 November 2016
18:30

Clermont	21–20	Grenoble (1 BP)
	Report

Stade Marcel-Michelin
Attendance: 15,000
Referee: Sébastien Minery

5 November 2016
20:45

Racing	21–9	Montpellier
	Report

Stade Olympique Yves-du-Manoir
Attendance: 8,233
Referee: Alexandre Ruiz

6 November 2016
12:30

(1 BP) La Rochelle	27–6	Pau
	Report

Stade Marcel-Deflandre
Attendance: 15,000
Referee: Tual Trainini

6 November 2016
16:15

Lyon	27–13	Toulon
	Report

Matmut Stadium
Attendance: 11,805
Referee: Laurent Cardona

=== Round 11 ===
12 November 2016
14:45

Pau	26–17	Racing
	Report

Stade du Hameau
Attendance: 10,018
Referee: Sébastien Minery

12 November 2016
20:15

Castres	32–13	Brive
	Report

Stade Pierre-Antoine
Attendance: 8,150
Referee: Tual Trainini

12 November 2016
20:15

Montpellier	25–20	Lyon (1 BP)
	Report

Altrad Stadium
Attendance: 10,250
Referee: Pierre Brousset

12 November 2016
20:15

(1 BP) Grenoble	22–24	Bordeaux Bègles
	Report

Stade des Alpes
Attendance: 15,132
Referee: Salem Attalah

12 November 2016
20:45

Bayonne	22–14	Clermont
	Report

Stade Jean Dauger
Attendance: 12,589
Referee: Maxime Chalon

13 November 2016
14:50

La Rochelle	25–19	Toulouse
	Report

Stade Marcel-Deflandre
Attendance: 15,000
Referee: Romain Poite

13 November 2016
21:00

Toulon	31–12	Stade Français
	Report

Stade Mayol
Attendance: 11,207
Referee: Alexandre Ruiz

=== Round 12 ===
19 November 2016
14:45

(1 BP) Castres	34–17	Toulon
	Report

Stade Pierre-Antoine
Attendance: 8,517
Referee: Romain Poite

19 November 2016
17:00

Racing	29–24	Grenoble (1 BP)
	Report

Stade Olympique Yves-du-Manoir
Attendance: 7,333
Referee: Cédric Marchat

19 November 2016
17:00

Brive	38–25	Pau
	Report

Stade Amédée Domenech
Attendance: 9,343
Referee: Laurent Cardona

19 November 2016
17:00

Clermont	16–13	Lyon (1 BP)
	Report

Stade Marcel-Michelin
Attendance: 15,682
Referee: Adrien Descottes

19 November 2016
17:00

Bordeaux Bègles	26–0	La Rochelle
	Report

Stade Chaban-Delmas
Attendance: 28,212
Referee: Pascal Gaüzère

20 November 2016
12:30

Stade Français	21–17	Montpellier (1 BP)
	Report

Stade Jean Bouin
Attendance: 7,226
Referee: Salem Attalah

20 November 2016
16:15

Bayonne	16–13	Toulouse (1 BP)
	Report

Stade Jean Dauger
Attendance: 13,500
Referee: Tual Trainini

=== Round 13 ===
3 December 2016
14:45

Pau	40–35	Clermont (1 BP)
	Report

Stade du Hameau
Attendance: 11,000
Referee: Pierre Brousset

3 December 2016
18:30

(1 BP) Stade Français	51–5	Bayonne
	Report

Stade Jean-Bouin
Attendance: 9,774
Referee: Mathieu Raynal

3 December 2016
18:30

(1 BP) Lyon	19–23	Castres
	Report

Matmut Stadium
Attendance: 10,352
Referee: Juan Sylvestre

3 December 2016
18:30

Grenoble	37–51	Montpellier (1 BP)
	Report

Stade des Alpes
Attendance: 12,500
Referee: Romain Poite

3 December 2016
20:45

La Rochelle	23–23	Racing
	Report

Stade Marcel-Deflandre
Attendance: 13,860
Referee: Jérôme Garcès

4 December 2016
12:30

(1 BP) Toulouse	30–12	Brive
	Report

Stade Ernest-Wallon
Attendance: 12,078
Referee: Adrien Descottes

4 December 2016
16:15

(1 BP) Toulon	37–10	Bordeaux Bègles
	Report

Stade Mayol
Attendance: 12,441
Referee: Laurent Cardona

=== Round 14 ===
22 December 2016
20:45

Grenoble	26–22	Toulouse (1 BP)
	Report

Stade des Alpes
Attendance: 12,500
Referee: Thomas Charabas

23 December 2016
17:00

Brive	22–6	Lyon
	Report

Stade Amédée-Domenech
Attendance: 9,973
Referee: Alexandre Ruiz

23 December 2016
19:00

(1 BP) Clermont	46–10	Stade Français
	Report

Stade Marcel-Michelin
Attendance: 17,677
Referee: Sébastien Minery

23 December 2016
19:00

(1 BP) Bordeaux Bègles	16–18	Pau
	Report

Stade Chaban-Delmas
Attendance: 23,219
Referee: Cédric Marchat

23 December 2016
19:00

Bayonne	17–42	La Rochelle (1 BP)
	Report

Stade Jean Dauger
Attendance: 12,500
Referee: Romain Poite

23 December 2016
19:00

Racing	23–10	Castres
	Report

Stade Olympique Yves-du-Manoir
Attendance: 8,127
Referee: Maxime Chalon

23 December 2016
21:00

Montpellier	33–29	Toulon (1 BP)
	Report

Altrad Stadium
Attendance: 14,997
Referee: Mathieu Raynal

=== Round 15 ===
30 December 2016
20:45

Lyon	19–16	Bordeaux Bègles (1 BP)
	Report

Matmut Stadium
Attendance: 10,183
Referee: Tual Trainini

31 December 2016
13:00

Pau	32–27	Montpellier (1 BP)
	Report

Stade du Hameau
Attendance: 12,064
Referee: Salem Attalah

31 December 2016
15:00

(1 BP) Castres	47–18	Bayonne
	Report

Stade Pierre-Antoine
Attendance: 8,740
Referee: Adrien Descottes

31 December 2016
15:00

Stade Français	12–10	Brive (1 BP)
	Report

Stade Jean Bouin
Attendance: 7,816
Referee: Laurent Cardona

31 December 2016
17:00

Toulouse	26–20	Clermont
	Report

Stadium Municipal
Attendance: 24,989
Referee: Pascal Gaüzère

1 January 2017
16:15

(1 BP) La Rochelle	40–3	Grenoble
	Report

Stade Marcel-Deflandre
Attendance: 15,000
Referee: Pierre Brousset

1 January 2017
20:45

Toulon	17–11	Racing
	Report

Stade Mayol
Attendance: 15,518
Referee: Romain Poite

=== Round 16 ===
6 January 2017
20:45

Montpellier	31–26	Bordeaux Bègles (1 BP)
	Report

Altrad Stadium
Attendance: 9,917
Referee: Maxime Chalon

7 January 2017
14:45

Brive	23–22	Grenoble (1 BP)
	Report

Stade Amédée Domenech
Attendance: 9,237
Referee: Cédric Marchat

7 January 2017
20:45

La Rochelle	22–8	Castres
	Report

Stade Marcel-Deflandre
Attendance: 15,000
Referee: Thomas Charabas

7 January 2017

Pau	P–P	Lyon

Stade du Hameau

- Postponed due to adverse weather conditions. Game rescheduled for 12 February 2017.

7 January 2017

Racing	P–P	Bayonne

Stade Olympique Yves-du-Manoir

- Postponed due to Racing playing a European Rugby Champions Cup fixture against Munster. The original fixture had been cancelled due to the death of Munster head coach Anthony Foley meaning the game was moved to a weekend. Racing's game against Bayonne would be rescheduled for 11 February 2017.

8 January 2017
16:15

(1 BP) Stade Français	15–18	Toulouse
	Report

Stade Jean Bouin
Attendance: 15,194
Referee: Alexandre Ruiz

8 January 2017
21:00

(1 BP) Clermont	30–6	Toulon
	Report

Stade Marcel-Michelin
Attendance: 17,881
Referee: Pierre Brousset

=== Round 17 ===
28 January 2017
14:45

(1 BP) Toulon	20–23	La Rochelle
	Report

Stade Mayol
Attendance: 13,792
Referee: Alexandre Ruiz

28 January 2017
18:30

Grenoble	44–22	Stade Français
	Report

Stade des Alpes
Attendance: 12,000
Referee: Romain Poite

28 January 2017
18:30

Toulouse	10–20	Pau
	Report

Stade Ernest-Wallon
Attendance: 12,198
Referee: Adrien Descottes

28 January 2017
18:30

Castres	38–25	Montpellier
	Report

Stade Pierre-Antoine
Attendance: 8,200
Referee: Pascal Gaüzère

28 January 2017
20:45

(1 BP) Lyon	37–25	Racing
	Report

Matmut Stadium de Gerland
Attendance: 15,269
Referee: Salem Attalah

29 January 2017
12:30

Bayonne	33–23	Brive
	Report

Stade Jean Dauger
Attendance: 10,208
Referee: Sébastien Minery

29 January 2017
16:45

Bordeaux Bègles	23–23	Clermont
	Report

Stade Chaban-Delmas
Attendance: 25,283
Referee: Mathieu Raynal

=== Round 16 rescheduled matches ===
11 February 2017
20:45

(1 BP) Racing	59–20	Bayonne
	Report

Stade Olympique Yves-du-Manoir
Attendance: 6,101
Referee: Laurent Cardona

- Game rescheduled from 8 January 2017.

12 February 2017
12:30

(1 BP) Pau	38–15	Lyon
	Report

Stade du Hameau
Attendance: 11,000
Referee: Mathieu Raynal

- Game rescheduled from 8 January 2017.

=== Round 18 ===
18 February 2017
14:45

La Rochelle	37–18	Stade Français
	Report

Stade Marcel-Deflandre
Attendance: 14,726
Referee: Mathieu Raynal

18 February 2017
18:30

Pau	39–22	Grenoble
	Report

Stade du Hameau
Attendance: 11,000
Referee: Tual Trainini

18 February 2017
18:30

(1 BP) Clermont	46–27	Bayonne
	Report

Stade Marcel-Michelin
Attendance: 17,027
Referee: Cédric Marchat

18 February 2017
18:30

Racing	33–25	Brive
	Report

Stade Olympique Yves-du-Manoir
Attendance: 7,692
Referee: Pierre Brousset

18 February 2017
20:45

Toulon	31–17	Lyon
	Report

Stade Mayol
Attendance: 12,906
Referee: Thomas Charabas

19 February 2017
12:30

Bordeaux Bègles	17–29	Castres
	Report

Stade Chaban-Delmas
Attendance: 22,230
Referee: Romain Poite

19 February 2017
16:45

Montpellier	27–18	Toulouse
	Report

Altrad Stadium
Attendance: 13,564
Referee: Jérôme Garcès

=== Round 19 ===
4 March 2017
14:45

Castres	26–16	Clermont
	Report

Stade Pierre-Antoine
Attendance: 10,017
Referee: Alexandre Ruiz

4 March 2017
18:30

Grenoble	19–10	Racing
	Report

Stade des Alpes
Attendance: 13,000
Referee: Pascal Gaüzère

4 March 2017
18:30

Bayonne	25–25	Pau
	Report

Stade Jean Dauger
Attendance: 15,005
Referee: Salem Attalah

4 March 2017
20:45

Brive	15–5	Toulon
	Report

Stade Amédée Domenech
Attendance: 11,127
Referee: Jérôme Garcès

5 March 2017
12:30

Lyon	16–3	Montpellier
	Report

Matmut Stadium de Gerland
Attendance: 12,152
Referee: Laurent Cardona

5 March 2017
17:00

(1 BP) Stade Français	32–9	Bordeaux Bègles
	Report

Stade Jean Bouin
Attendance: 9,424
Referee: Adrien Descottes

5 March 2017
17:00

Toulouse	21–27	La Rochelle
	Report

Stade Ernest-Wallon
Attendance: 17,306
Referee: Maxime Chalon

=== Round 20 ===
11 March 2017
18:30

(1 BP) Bordeaux Bègles	46–14	Grenoble
	Report

Stade Chaban-Delmas
Attendance: 23,818
Referee: Alexandre Ruiz

11 March 2017
18:30

Lyon	35–33	Stade Français (1 BP)
	Report

Matmut Stadium de Gerland
Attendance: 12,649
Referee: Tual Trainini

11 March 2017
18:30

(1 BP) Toulon	82–14	Bayonne
	Report

Stade Mayol
Attendance: 16,049
Referee: Maxime Chalon

11 March 2017
19:00

Brive	21–19	Toulouse (1 BP)
	Report

Stade Amédée Domenech
Attendance: 11,920
Referee: Sébastien Minery

11 March 2017
21:00

Racing	15–38	La Rochelle
	Report

Stade Olympique Yves-du-Manoir
Attendance: 12,000
Referee: Cédric Marchat

12 March 2017
12:30

Pau	18–12	Castres
	Report

Stade du Hameau
Attendance: 11,500
Referee: Thomas Charabas

12 March 2017
17:00

Clermont	19–28	Montpellier (1 BP)
	Report

Stade Marcel-Michelin
Attendance: 16,300
Referee: Salem Attalah

=== Round 21 ===
17 March 2017

Castres	P–P	Stade Français

Stade Pierre-Antoine

- Postponed due to player strikes and turmoil surrounding the announced merger between franciliens teams Stade Français and Racing 92. Game would be rescheduled to 19 April 2017.

18 March 2017

Montpellier	P–P	Racing

Altrad Stadium

- Postponed due to player strikes and turmoil surrounding the announced merger between franciliens teams Stade Français and Racing 92. Game would be rescheduled to 22 April 2017.

18 March 2017
18:30

Bayonne	24–20	Bordeaux Bègles (1 BP)
	Report

Stade Jean Dauger
Attendance: 14,017
Referee: Juan Sylvestre

18 March 2017
18:30

(1 BP) Clermont	65–13	Pau
	Report

Stade Marcel-Michelin
Attendance: 16,664
Referee: Maxime Chalon

18 March 2017
18:30

(1 BP) La Rochelle	36–17	Brive
	Report

Stade Marcel-Deflandre
Attendance: 15,000
Referee: Alexandre Ruiz

19 March 2017
12:30

Toulouse	42–26	Lyon
	Report

Stade Ernest-Wallon
Attendance: 10,306
Referee: Salem Attalah

19 March 2017
17:00

Grenoble	23–23	Toulon
	Report

Stade des Alpes
Attendance: 15,200
Referee: Adrien Descottes

=== Round 22 ===
25 March 2017
14:45

Racing	27–24	Clermont (1 BP)
	Report

Stade Pierre-Mauroy
Attendance: 31,432
Referee: Laurent Cardona

25 March 2017
18:30

Grenoble	21–20	Castres (1 BP)
	Report

Stade des Alpes
Attendance: 13,332
Referee: Tual Trainini

25 March 2017
18:30

(1 BP) Lyon	52–7	Bayonne
	Report

Matmut Stadium de Gerland
Attendance: 12,109
Referee: Adrien Descottes

25 March 2017
18:30

Pau	13–23	La Rochelle
	Report

Stade du Hameau
Attendance: 12,000
Referee: Romain Poite

25 March 2017
20:45

Bordeaux Bègles	20–11	Toulouse
	Report

Stade Chaban-Delmas
Attendance: 26,125
Referee: Mathieu Raynal

26 March 2017
17:00

Brive	28–25	Montpellier (1 BP)
	Report

Stade Amédée Domenech
Attendance: 9,543
Referee: Pierre Brousset

26 March 2017
21:00

Stade Français	17–11	Toulon
	Report

Stade Jean Bouin
Attendance: 14,962
Referee: Thomas Charabas

=== Round 23 ===
8 April 2017
14:45

La Rochelle	16–5	Bordeaux Bègles
	Report

Stade Marcel-Deflandre
Attendance: 15,000
Referee: Sébastien Minery

8 April 2017
18:30

(1 BP) Montpellier	54–14	Grenoble
	Report

Altrad Stadium
Attendance: 10,842
Referee: Cédric Marchat

8 April 2017
18:30

Bayonne	16–32	Stade Français (1 BP)
	Report

Stade Jean-Dauger
Attendance: 12,460
Referee: Salem Attalah

8 April 2017
18:30

(1 BP) Castres	16–17	Lyon
	Report

Stade Pierre-Antoine
Attendance: 9,100
Referee: Jérôme Garcès

8 April 2017
20:45

(1 BP) Clermont	21–26	Brive
	Report

Stade Marcel-Michelin
Attendance: 18,700
Referee: Romain Poite

9 April 2017
12:30

Racing	34–32	Pau (1 BP)
	Report

Stade Olympique Yves-du-Manoir
Attendance: 8,176
Referee: Mathieu Raynal

9 April 2017
17:00

Toulon	33–23	Toulouse
	Report

Stade Vélodrome
Attendance: 51,672
Referee: Alexandre Ruiz

=== Round 24 ===
15 April 2017
14:45

Toulon	23–14	Castres
	Report

Stade Mayol
Attendance: 15,607
Referee: Thomas Charabas

15 April 2017
18:30

(1 BP) Brive	19–22	Bordeaux Bègles
	Report

Stade Amédée Domenech
Attendance: 11,579
Referee: Laurent Cardona

15 April 2017
18:30

(1 BP) Stade Français	51–16	Pau
	Report

Stade Jean-Bouin
Attendance: 9,371
Referee: Tual Trainini

15 April 2017
18:30

Grenoble	18–59	Clermont (1 BP)
	Report

Stade des Alpes
Attendance: 15,000
Referee: Pierre Brousset

15 April 2017
20:45

Lyon	29–25	La Rochelle (1 BP)
	Report

Matmut Stadium de Gerland
Attendance: 14,192
Referee: Maxime Chalon

16 April 2017
12:30

(1 BP) Montpellier	61–22	Bayonne
	Report

Altrad Stadium
Attendance: 9,000
Referee: Sébastien Cloute

16 April 2017
17:00

(1 BP) Toulouse	8–10	Racing
	Report

Stadium Municipal
Attendance: 23,106
Referee: Pascal Gaüzère

=== Round 21 rescheduled matches ===
19 April 2017
20:45

(1 BP) Castres	33–10	Stade Français
	Report

Stade Pierre-Antoine
Attendance: 9,461
Referee: Sébastien Minery

- Game rescheduled from 17 March 2017.

22 April 2017
18:45

(1 BP) Montpellier	54–3	Racing
	Report

Altrad Stadium
Attendance: 10,815
Referee: Mathieu Raynal

- Game rescheduled from 18 March 2017.

=== Round 25 ===
29 April 2017
14:45

(1 BP) Castres	52–7	Toulouse
	Report

Stade Pierre-Antoine
Attendance: 10,228
Referee: Adrien Descottes

29 April 2017
18:30

Pau	32–27	Brive (1 BP)
	Report

Stade du Hameau
Attendance: 11,800
Referee: Alexandre Ruiz

29 April 2017
18:30

Bayonne	43–35	Grenoble
	Report

Stade Jean Dauger
Attendance: 10,848
Referee: Sébastien Minery

29 April 2017
18:30

(1 BP) Lyon	20–23	Clermont
	Report

Matmut Stadium de Gerland
Attendance: 21,465
Referee: Pascal Gaüzère

29 April 2017
20:45

Bordeaux Bègles	13–26	Toulon
	Report

Matmut Atlantique
Attendance: 26,624
Referee: Salem Attalah

30 April 2017
12:30

La Rochelle	40–37	Montpellier (1 BP)
	Report

Stade Marcel-Deflandre
Attendance: 15,000
Referee: Romain Poite

30 April 2017
17:00

Stade Français	27–23	Racing (1 BP)
	Report

Stade Jean-Bouin
Attendance: 19,883
Referee: Mathieu Raynal

=== Round 26 ===
6 May 2017
21:00

Clermont	30–26	La Rochelle (1 BP)
	Report

Stade Marcel-Michelin
Attendance: 18,778
Referee: Mathieu Raynal

6 May 2017
21:00

Racing	22–20	Bordeaux Bègles (1 BP)
	Report

Stade Olympique Yves-du-Manoir
Attendance: 9,640
Referee: Alexandre Ruiz

6 May 2017
21:00

Toulon	32–12	Pau
	Report

Stade Mayol
Attendance: 14,538
Referee: Laurent Cardona

6 May 2017
21:00

Toulouse	28–12	Bayonne
	Report

Stade Ernest-Wallon
Attendance: 17,392
Referee: Maxime Chalon

6 May 2017
21:00

(1 BP) Grenoble	53–21	Lyon
	Report

Stade des Alpes
Attendance: 14,000
Referee: Cédric Marchat

6 May 2017
21:00

Brive	33–27	Castres
	Report

Stade Amédée Domenech
Attendance: 11,081
Referee: Romain Poite

6 May 2017
21:00

Montpellier	27–26	Stade Français (1 BP)
	Report

Altrad Stadium
Attendance: 12,470
Referee: Pascal Gaüzère

== Playoffs ==
Semi-final Qualifiers
4	Toulon	26
5	Castres	22
3	Montpellier	13
6	Racing	22

Semifinals
1	La Rochelle	15
4	Toulon	18
2	Clermont	37
6	Racing	31

Final
4	Toulon	16
2	Clermont	22

=== Semi-final Qualifiers ===
19 May 2017
21:00

Toulon	26–22	Castres
Try: Delboulbes 19' c Halfpenny 64' c Con: Halfpenny (2/2) 19', 65'; Pen: Halfpenny (4/4) 3', 29', 60', 71'	Report	Try: Penalty try 55' c Con: Urdapilleta (1/1) 56'; Pen: Urdapilleta (5/5) 4', 22', 31', 49', 73'

Stade Mayol
Attendance: 14,892
Referee: Alexandre Ruiz

20 May 2017
17:00

Montpellier	13–22	Racing
Try: Paillaugue 19' c Con: Catrakilis (1/1) 21'; Pen: Catrakilis (2/3) 39', 52'	Report	Try: Nakarawa 15' c Thomas 24' c Rokocoko 76' m Con: Carter (2/3) 16', 26'; Pen: Carter (1/2) 80'

Altrad Stadium
Attendance: 13,589
Referee: Romain Poite

=== Semi-finals ===
26 May 2017
21:00

La Rochelle	15–18	Toulon
Pen: James (4/4) 30', 40', 43', 47'; Drop: James (1/1) 20'	Report	Pen: Halfpenny (5/5) 24', 32', 52', 55', 69'; Drop: Belleau (1/1) 80'

Stade Vélodrome, Marseille
Attendance: 63,642
Referee: Pascal Gaüzère

27 May 2017
18:00

Clermont	37–31	Racing
Try: Penaud 18' m Lopez (2) 27' m, 47' c Lee 63' m Con: Parra (1/4) 27'; Pen: Parra (5/5) 12', 30', 40', 55', 61'	Report	Try: Masoe (2) 70' m, 77' c Tameifuna 80+1' c Con: Hart (1/2) 77'; Masoe (1/1) 80+1'; Pen: Carter (4/4) 9', 23', 42', 45'

Stade Vélodrome, Marseille
Attendance: 64,123
Referee: Mathieu Raynal

=== Final ===
4 June 2017
20:45

Clermont	22–16	Toulon
Try: Raka 10'c Con: Parra (1/1) 11'; Pen: Parra (5/5) 6', 22', 40', 49', 74'	Report	Try: Tuisova 37'c Con: Belleau (1/1) 38'; Pen: Belleau (2/4) 33', 44'; Trinh-Duc (1/1) 72'

Stade de France, Saint-Denis
Attendance: 79,771
Referee: Romain Poite

FB	15	(England) Nick Abendanon
RW	14	(England) David Strettle	(substituted off) 72'
OC	13	(France) Damian Penaud	(substituted off) 49'
IC	12	(France) Rémi Lamerat
LW	11	(Fiji) Alivereti Raka
FH	10	(France) Camille Lopez
SH	9	(France) Morgan Parra
N8	8	(New Zealand) Fritz Lee	(yellow card) 35' to 45'
OF	7	(France) Judicaël Cancoriet
BF	6	(France) Damien Chouly (c)
RL	5	(Australia) Sitaleki Timani	(substituted off) 26'
LL	4	(France) Arthur Iturria	(substituted off) 42'
TP	3	(Georgia (country)) Davit Zirakashvili	(substituted off) 78'
HK	2	(France) Benjamin Kayser	(substituted off) 60'
LP	1	(France) Raphaël Chaume	(substituted off) 68'
Substitutions:
HK	16	(Australia) John Ulugia	(substituted on) 60'
PR	17	(France) Étienne Falgoux	(substituted on) 68'
LK	18	(France) Paul Jedrasiak	(substituted on) 26'
FL	19	(Fiji) Peceli Yato	(substituted on) 42'
SH	20	(France) Ludovic Radosavljevic
FH	21	(Argentina) Patricio Fernández	(substituted on) 72'
CE	22	(France) Aurélien Rougerie	(substituted on) 49'
PR	23	(Wales) Aaron Jarvis	(substituted on) 78'
Coach:
(France) Franck Azéma

FB	15	(Australia) James O'Connor	(substituted off) 35' (substituted on) 40+1'
RW	14	(Fiji) Josua Tuisova	(substituted off) 69' (substituted on) 72'
OC	13	(France) Mathieu Bastareaud
IC	12	(New Zealand) Ma'a Nonu
LW	11	(Australia) Drew Mitchell	(substituted off) 60' (substituted on) 69' (substituted off) 72'
FH	10	(France) Anthony Belleau	(substituted off) 60'
SH	9	(France) Sébastien Tillous-Borde
N8	8	(South Africa) Duane Vermeulen (c)
OF	7	(Australia) Liam Gill
BF	6	(South Africa) Juan Smith	(substituted off) 64' (substituted on) 78'
RL	5	(France) Romain Taofifénua	(substituted off) 64'
LL	4	(South Africa) Juandré Kruger
TP	3	(South Africa) Marcel van der Merwe	(substituted off) 53'
HK	2	(France) Guilhem Guirado	(substituted off) 69'
LP	1	(France) Laurent Delboulbès	(substituted off) 42' (substituted on) 53' (substituted off) 55'
Substitutions:
HK	16	(France) Anthony Etrillard	(substituted on) 69'
PR	17	(France) Xavier Chiocci	(substituted on) 42' (substituted off) 53' (substituted on) 55'
LK	18	(Georgia (country)) Mamuka Gorgodze	(substituted on) 64'
FL	19	(Argentina) Juan Martín Fernández Lobbe	(substituted on) 64' (substituted off) 78'
FH	20	(France) François Trinh-Duc	(substituted on) 35' (substituted off) 40+1' (substituted on) 60'
CE	21	(Australia) Matt Giteau	(substituted on) 60'
SH	22	(France) Éric Escande
PR	23	(Georgia (country)) Levan Chilachava	(substituted on) 53'
Coach:
(England) Richard Cockerill

== Leading scorers ==
Note: Flags to the left of player names indicate national team as has been defined under World Rugby eligibility rules, or primary nationality for players who have not yet earned international senior caps. Players may hold one or more non-WR nationalities.

=== Top points scorers ===
Rank	Player	Club	Points
1	(France) Gaëtan Germain	Brive	324
2	(Argentina) Benjamin Urdapilleta	Castres	253
3	(Wales) Leigh Halfpenny	Toulon	223
4	(France) Jonathan Wisniewski	Grenoble	220
5	(Australia) Brock James	La Rochelle	214
6	(New Zealand) Tom Taylor	Pau	208
7	(France) Jules Plisson	Stade Français	201
8	(France) Morgan Parra	Clermont	183
9	(New Zealand) Dan Carter	Racing	166
10	(France) Frédéric Michalak	Lyon	155

=== Top try scorers ===
Rank	Player	Club	Tries
1	(Fiji) Waisea Nayacalevu	Stade Français	14
2	(Fiji) Watisoni Votu	Pau	13
3	(Argentina) Juan Imhoff	Racing	11
3	(England) David Strettle	Clermont	11
5	(France) Gabriel Lacroix	La Rochelle	10
6	(England) Carl Fearns	Lyon	8
6	(France) Benjamin Lapeyre	Brive	8
6	(Fiji) Leone Nakarawa	Racing	8
6	(France) Noa Nakaitaci	Clermont	8
6	(Australia) Joe Tomane	Montpellier	8
6	(Fiji) Nemani Nadolo	Montpellier	8

== Attendances ==
- Attendances do not include the semi-finals or final as these are at neutral venues.

Club	Home Games	Total	Average	Highest	Lowest	% Capacity
Bayonne	13	166,415	12,801	16,933	10,200	76%
Bordeaux Bègles	13	310,438	23,880	28,212	18,564	68%
Brive	13	137,578	10,583	13,979	8,979	76%
Castres	13	114,008	8,770	10,228	7,903	76%
Clermont	13	221,080	17,006	18,778	15,000	89%
Grenoble	13	167,164	12,859	15,200	9,000	64%
La Rochelle	13	193,586	14,891	15,000	13,860	99%
Lyon	13	159,491	12,269	21,465	8,385	74%
Montpellier (Note: Montpellier's attendance figure includes home semi-final qualifier.)	14	157,738	11,267	14,997	9,000	72%
Pau	13	144,903	11,146	12,064	10,018	62%
Racing 92	13	136,349	10,488	31,432	6,101	62%
Stade Francais	13	141,794	10,907	19,883	5,000	55%
Toulon (Note: Toulon's attendance figure includes home semi-final qualifier.)	14	259,107	18,508	51,672	11,207	86%
Toulouse	13	198,310	15,255	24,989	10,034	70%

== See also ==
- 2016–17 Rugby Pro D2 season
