= 2017–18 Top 14 season =

French top-flight rugby union season

2017–18 Top 14
- Countries: France
- Date: 26 August 2017 – 2 June 2018
- Champions: Castres (5th title)
- Runners-up: Montpellier
- Relegated: Brive, Oyonnax
- Matches played: 187
- Attendance: 2,681,834 (average 14,341 per match)
- Highest attendance: 78,442 (play-offs); Montpellier v Castres; 2 June 2018; 42,000 (league); Toulon v Montpellier; 14 April 2018
- Lowest attendance: 5,678; Stade Français v Agen; 24 February 2018
- Top point scorer: (New Zealand) Ben Botica (Oyonnax); 315 points
- Top try scorer: (England) Chris Ashton (Toulon); 24 tries

Official website
- www.lnr.fr/rugby-top-14

The 2017–18 Top 14 competition was the 119th French domestic rugby union club competition operated by the Ligue Nationale de Rugby (LNR). Two new teams from the 2016–17 Pro D2 season were promoted to Top 14 (Oyonnax and Agen) in place of the two relegated teams, Grenoble and Bayonne. It marks the second time in a row that both promoted teams had returned on their first opportunity after relegation (Oyonnax and Agen were both relegated during the 2015–16 Top 14 season).

== Teams ==
Locations of the 2017–18 Top 14 teams

Club	City (department)	Stadium	Capacity
Agen	Agen (Lot-et-Garonne)	Stade Armandie	14,000
Bordeaux Bègles	Bordeaux (Gironde)	Stade Chaban-Delmas; Matmut Atlantique	34,694; 42,115
Brive	Brive-la-Gaillarde (Corrèze)	Stade Amédée-Domenech	13,979
Castres	Castres (Tarn)	Stade Pierre-Fabre (Note: Castres' stadium was known as Stade Pierre-Antoine at the start of the season. It was renamed after late club owner Pierre Fabre on 9 September 2017.)	12,500
Clermont	Clermont-Ferrand (Puy-de-Dôme)	Stade Marcel-Michelin	19,022
La Rochelle	La Rochelle (Charente-Maritime)	Stade Marcel-Deflandre	16,000
Lyon	Lyon (Métropole de Lyon)	Matmut Stadium de Gerland	25,000
Montpellier	Montpellier (Hérault)	Altrad Stadium	15,697
Oyonnax	Oyonnax (Ain)	Stade Charles-Mathon	11,400
Pau	Pau (Pyrénées-Atlantiques)	Stade du Hameau	18,324
Racing 92	Nanterre (Hauts-de-Seine)	Stade Olympique Yves-du-Manoir; U Arena (Note: Racing opened the 2017–18 season at Yves-du-Manoir in Colombes. Their first match at U Arena was against Toulouse on 22 December 2017.) (Note: Racing were forced to play their Round 26 home fixture against Agen on 5 May 2018 elsewhere because Beyoncé and Jay-Z booked U Arena as a rehearsal space for the European leg of their On the Run II Tour. The club chose Stade de la Rabine in Vannes (capacity 9,500) as the substitute venue.)	14,000; 30,681
Stade Français	Paris, 16th arrondissement	Stade Jean-Bouin	20,000
Toulon	Toulon (Var)	Stade Mayol (Note: In recent years, Toulon has taken occasional home matches to Stade Vélodrome in Marseille and Allianz Riviera in Nice.)	18,200
Toulouse	Toulouse (Haute-Garonne)	Stade Ernest-Wallon (Note: Toulouse often takes high-demand home matches to the city's largest sporting venue, Stadium Municipal.)	19,500

== Number of teams by regions ==
Teams	Region or country	Team(s)
5	Nouvelle-Aquitaine	Agen, Bordeaux Bègles, Brive, La Rochelle, and Pau
3	Auvergne-Rhône-Alpes	Clermont, Lyon, and Oyonnax
3	Occitanie	Castres, Montpellier, and Toulouse
2	Île-de-France	Racing 92 and Stade Français
1	Provence-Alpes-Côte d'Azur	Toulon

== Competition format ==
The top six teams at the end of the regular season (after all the teams played one another twice, once at home, once away) enter a knockout stage to decide the Champions of France. This consists of three rounds: the teams finishing third to sixth in the table play quarter-finals (hosted by the third and fourth placed teams). The winners then face the top two teams in the semi-finals, with the winners meeting in the final at the Stade de France in Saint-Denis.

The LNR uses a slightly different bonus points system from that used in most other rugby competitions. It trialled a new system in 2007–08 explicitly designed to prevent a losing team from earning more than one bonus point in a match, a system that also made it impossible for either team to earn a bonus point in a drawn match. LNR chose to continue with this system for subsequent seasons.

France's bonus point system operates as follows:

- 4 points for a win.
- 2 points for a draw.
- 1 bonus point for winning while scoring at least 3 more tries than the opponent. This replaces the standard bonus point for scoring 4 tries regardless of the match result.
- 1 bonus point for losing by 5 points (or fewer). The margin had been 7 points until being changed prior to the 2014–15 season.

== Table ==
2017–18 Top 14 Table
	Club	Played	Won	Drawn	Lost	Points For	Points Against	Points Diff.	Try Bonus	Losing Bonus	Points
1	Montpellier (RU)	26	17	0	9	752	559	+193	12	1	81
2	Racing (SF)	26	18	0	8	622	478	+144	5	3	80
3	Toulouse (QF)	26	16	1	9	719	595	+124	4	4	74
4	Toulon (QF)	26	14	0	12	766	507	+259	9	8	73
5	Lyon (SF)	26	15	0	11	689	541	+148	7	3	70
6	Castres (C)	26	15	0	11	638	624	+14	4	5	69
7	La Rochelle	26	14	1	11	686	531	+155	6	3	67
8	Pau	26	15	0	11	590	584	+6	2	4	66
9	Clermont	26	11	1	14	629	687	–58	4	4	54
10	Bordeaux Bègles	26	10	1	15	557	623	–66	3	3	48
11	Agen	26	10	0	16	537	757	–220	2	4	46
12	Stade Français	26	9	0	17	540	740	–200	2	4	42
13	Oyonnax (R)	26	7	3	16	566	824	–258	1	4	39
14	Brive (R)	26	7	1	18	485	726	–241	1	5	36
If teams are level at any stage, tiebreakers are applied in the following order: 1. Competition points earned in head-to-head matches 2. Points difference in head-to-head matches 3. Try differential in head-to-head matches 4. Points difference in all matches 5. Try differential in all matches 6. Points scored in all matches 7. Tries scored in all matches 8. Fewer matches forfeited 9. Classification in the previous Top 14 season
Green background (rows 1 and 2) receive semi-final play-off places and receive berths in the 2018–19 European Rugby Champions Cup. Blue background (rows 3 to 6) receive quarter-final play-off places, and receive berths in the Champions Cup. Plain background indicates teams that earn a place in the 2018–19 European Rugby Challenge Cup. Pink background (row 13) will be contest a play-off with the runners-up of the 2017–18 Rugby Pro D2 season for a place in the 2018–19 Top 14 season. Red background (row 14) will be relegated to Rugby Pro D2. Final table

== Relegation ==
Starting from the 2017–18 season forward, only the 14th placed team will be automatically relegated to Pro D2. The 13th placed team will face the runner-up of the Pro D2 play-off, with the winner of that play-off taking up the final place in Top 14 for the following season.

== Fixtures and results ==
=== Round 1 ===
26 August 2017
15:10

Oyonnax	23–23	Toulouse
	Report

Stade Charles-Mathon
Attendance: 10,089
Referee: Mathieu Raynal

26 August 2017
18:00

Racing	25–21	Castres (1 BP)
	Report

Stade Olympique Yves-du-Manoir
Attendance: 5,865
Referee: Maxime Chalon

26 August 2017
18:00

(1 BP) Montpellier	48–19	Agen
	Report

Altrad Stadium
Attendance: 10,122
Referee: Tual Trainini

26 August 2017
18:00

Stade Français	16–25	Lyon
	Report

Stade Jean-Bouin
Attendance: 12,340
Referee: Sébastien Minery

26 August 2017
18:00

Brive	10–19	La Rochelle
	Report

Stade Amédée-Domenech
Attendance: 11,176
Referee: Alexandre Ruiz

26 August 2017
20:45

Bordeaux Bègles	32–25	Clermont
	Report

Stade Chaban-Delmas
Attendance: 23,212
Referee: Thomas Charabas

27 August 2017
17:00

Toulon	41–14	Pau
	Report

Stade Mayol
Attendance: 15,940
Referee: Laurent Cardona

=== Round 2 ===
2 September 2017
14:45

Agen	23–19	Racing (1 BP)
	Report

Stade Armandie
Attendance: 6,576
Referee: Pierre Brousset

2 September 2017
16:45

Stade Français	35–24	La Rochelle
	Report

Stade Jean-Bouin
Attendance: 10,360
Referee: Mathieu Raynal

2 September 2017
18:45

(1 BP) Montpellier	37–6	Oyonnax
	Report

Altrad Stadium
Attendance: 10,500
Referee: Ludovic Cayre

2 September 2017
18:45

Lyon	29–14	Brive
	Report

Matmut Stadium de Gerland
Attendance: 13,890
Referee: Jonathan Dufort

2 September 2017
18:45

(1 BP) Castres	33–19	Bordeaux Bègles
	Report

Stade Pierre-Antoine
Attendance: 8,691
Referee: Romain Poite

2 September 2017
20:45

Toulouse	23–19	Pau (1 BP)
	Report

Stade Ernest-Wallon
Attendance: 13,230
Referee: Cyril Lafon

3 September 2017
16:50

Clermont	21–16	Toulon (1 BP)
	Report

Stade Marcel-Michelin
Attendance: 18,558
Referee: Pascal Gaüzère

=== Round 3 ===
9 September 2017
14:45

(1 BP) La Rochelle	51–20	Clermont
	Report

Stade Marcel-Deflandre
Attendance: 15,000
Referee: Romain Poite

9 September 2017
18:00

Bordeaux Bègles	30–10	Stade Français
	Report

Stade Chaban-Delmas
Attendance: 19,629
Referee: Adrien Descottes

9 September 2017
18:00

Oyonnax	12–10	Agen (1 BP)
	Report

Stade Charles-Mathon
Attendance: 8,000
Referee: Julien Castaignède

9 September 2017
18:00

Brive	6–25	Racing (1 BP)
	Report

Stade Amédée-Domenech
Attendance: 9,447
Referee: Laurent Cardona

9 September 2017
20:45

(1 BP) Castres	17–22	Montpellier
	Report

Stade Pierre-Fabre
Attendance: 12,023
Referee: Pascal Gaüzère

10 September 2017
12:30

Pau	30–14	Lyon
	Report

Stade du Hameau
Attendance: 10,500
Referee: Maxime Chalon

10 September 2017
16:50

Toulon	20–16	Toulouse (1 BP)
	Report

Stade Mayol
Attendance: 15,538
Referee: Alexandre Ruiz

=== Round 4 ===
16 September 2017
14:45

(1 BP) Toulouse	53–17	Stade Français
	Report

Stade Ernest-Wallon
Attendance: 13,850
Referee: Thomas Charabas

16 September 2017
18:00

(1 BP) Lyon	49–14	Bordeaux Bègles
	Report

Matmut Stadium de Gerland
Attendance: 12,752
Referee: Ludovic Cayre

16 September 2017
18:00

Pau	28–13	Castres
	Report

Stade du Hameau
Attendance: 10,300
Referee: Alexandre Ruiz

16 September 2017
18:00

(1 BP) Agen	15–20	La Rochelle
	Report

Stade Armandie
Attendance: 7,356
Referee: Cyril Lafon

16 September 2017
20:45

(1 BP) Clermont	62–6	Brive
	Report

Stade Marcel-Michelin
Attendance: 16,500
Referee: Pierre Brousset

17 September 2017
12:30

Racing	25–13	Oyonnax
	Report

Stade Olympique Yves-du-Manoir
Attendance: 5,830
Referee: Tual Trainini

17 September 2017
16:50

(1 BP) Montpellier	43–20	Toulon
	Report

Altrad Stadium
Attendance: 15,034
Referee: Mathieu Raynal

=== Round 5 ===
23 September 2017
14:45

Clermont	23–21	Racing (1 BP)
	Report

Stade Marcel-Michelin
Attendance: 16,934
Referee: Mathieu Raynal

23 September 2017
18:00

(1 BP) Bordeaux Bègles	47–17	Montpellier
	Report

Stade Chaban-Delmas
Attendance: 21,619
Referee: Laurent Cardona

23 September 2017
18:00

(1 BP) Agen	14–20	Pau
	Report

Stade Armandie
Attendance: 6,869
Referee: Adrien Descottes

23 September 2017
18:00

(1 BP) La Rochelle	57–12	Oyonnax
	Report

Stade Marcel-Deflandre
Attendance: 16,000
Referee: Sébastien Minery

23 September 2017
20:45

(1 BP) Brive	19–22	Toulouse
	Report

Stade Amédée-Domenech
Attendance: 10,664
Referee: Pascal Gaüzère

24 September 2017
12:30

(1 BP) Lyon	31–12	Castres
	Report

Matmut Stadium de Gerland
Attendance: 11,143
Referee: Tual Trainini

24 September 2017
16:50

(1 BP) Stade Français	15–19	Toulon (1 BP)
	Report

Stade Jean-Bouin
Attendance: 14,075
Referee: Jonathan Dufort

=== Round 6 ===
30 September 2017
14:45

Toulon	26–20	La Rochelle
	Report

Stade Mayol
Attendance: 16,128
Referee: Romain Poite

30 September 2017
18:00

(1 BP) Pau	23–25	Stade Français
	Report

Stade du Hameau
Attendance: 11,312
Referee: Ludovic Cayre

30 September 2017
18:00

(1 BP) Toulouse	30–10	Agen
	Report

Stade Ernest-Wallon
Attendance: 12,979
Referee: Jonathan Dufort

30 September 2017
18:00

Oyonnax	9–39	Bordeaux Bègles (1 BP)
	Report

Stade Charles-Mathon
Attendance: 7,854
Referee: Maxime Chalon

30 September 2017
20:45

(1 BP) Racing	17–20	Lyon
	Report

Stade Olympique Yves-du-Manoir
Attendance: 6,398
Referee: Pierre Brousset

1 October 2017
12:30

(1 BP) Montpellier	54–10	Brive
	Report

Altrad Stadium
Attendance: 8,928
Referee: Thomas Charabas

1 October 2017
16:50

Castres	29–23	Clermont
	Report

Stade Pierre-Fabre
Attendance: 10,012
Referee: Cyril Lafon

=== Round 7 ===
7 October 2017
14:45

Stade Français	31–20	Montpellier
	Report

Stade Jean-Bouin
Attendance: 9,704
Referee: Sébastien Minery

7 October 2017
16:45

Bordeaux Bègles	30–27	Toulon (1 BP)
	Report

Matmut Atlantique
Attendance: 21,678
Referee: Pierre Brousset

7 October 2017
18:45

(1 BP) Oyonnax	16–19	Pau
	Report

Stade Charles-Mathon
Attendance: 7,756
Referee: Tual Trainini

7 October 2017
18:45

Brive	27–22	Castres (1 BP)
	Report

Stade Amédée-Domenech
Attendance: 9,556
Referee: Adrien Descottes

7 October 2017
20:45

Agen	6–25	Lyon (1 BP)
	Report

Stade Armandie
Attendance: 6,104
Referee: Laurent Cardona

8 October 2017
16:50

La Rochelle	16–9	Racing
	Report

Stade Marcel-Deflandre
Attendance: 16,000
Referee: Pascal Gaüzère

8 October 2017
21:00

Toulouse	28–18	Clermont
	Report

Stade Ernest-Wallon
Attendance: 18,838
Referee: Alexandre Ruiz

=== Round 8 ===
28 October 2017
14:45

(1 BP) Toulon	41–24	Brive
	Report

Stade Mayol
Attendance: 16,128
Referee: Sébastien Minéry

28 October 2017
18:00

Racing	29–13	Bordeaux Bègles
	Report

Stade Olympique Yves-du-Manoir
Attendance: 6,488
Referee: Alexandre Ruiz

28 October 2017
18:00

Pau	16–22	Montpellier
	Report

Stade du Hameau
Attendance: 12,306
Referee: Cyril Lafon

28 October 2017
18:00

(1 BP) Lyon	52–18	Oyonnax
	Report

Matmut Stadium de Gerland
Attendance: 13,542
Referee: Jonathan Dufort

28 October 2017
20:45

Clermont	33–10	Stade Français
	Report

Stade Marcel-Michelin
Attendance: 18,365
Referee: Romain Poite

29 October 2017
12:30

(1 BP) Castres	43–28	Agen
	Report

Stade Pierre-Fabre
Attendance: 9,193
Referee: Thomas Charabas

29 October 2017
16:50

La Rochelle	37–21	Toulouse
	Report

Stade Marcel-Deflandre
Attendance: 16,000
Referee: Jérôme Garcès

=== Round 9 ===
4 November 2017
14:45

Toulouse	38–37	Bordeaux Bègles (1 BP)
	Report

Stade Ernest-Wallon
Attendance: 16,356
Referee: Pascal Gaüzère

4 November 2017
18:30

Oyonnax	19–32	Castres
	Report

Stade Charles-Mathon
Attendance: 8,054
Referee: Ludovic Cayre

4 November 2017
18:30

Racing	23–20	Pau (1 BP)
	Report

Stade Olympique Yves-du-Manoir
Attendance: 6,000
Referee: Romain Poite

4 November 2017
18:30

(1 BP) Lyon	15–19	La Rochelle
	Report

Matmut Stadium de Gerland
Attendance: 15,708
Referee: Mathieu Raynal

4 November 2017
20:45

Agen	26–24	Toulon (1 BP)
	Report

Stade Armandie
Attendance: 8,660
Referee: Maxime Chalon

5 November 2017
12:30

Brive	20–19	Stade Français (1 BP)
	Report

Stade Amédée-Domenech
Attendance: 9,812
Referee: Laurent Cardona

5 November 2017
16:50

Montpellier	28–24	Clermont (1 BP)
	Report

Altrad Stadium
Attendance: 14,198
Referee: Jérôme Garcès

=== Round 10 ===
18 November 2017
14:45

(1 BP) Clermont	39–18	Lyon
	Report

Stade Marcel-Michelin
Attendance: 18,472
Referee: Laurent Cardona

18 November 2017
18:00

Pau	34–15	Brive
	Report

Stade du Hameau
Attendance: 10,000
Referee: Jonathan Dufort

18 November 2017
18:00

Castres	31–15	La Rochelle
	Report

Stade Pierre-Fabre
Attendance: 9,126
Referee: Adrien Descottes

18 November 2017
18:00

Bordeaux Bègles	33–23	Agen
	Report

Stade Chaban-Delmas
Attendance: 21,028
Referee: Cyril Lafon

18 November 2017
18:00

(1 BP) Montpellier	32–22	Toulouse
	Report

Altrad Stadium
Attendance: 10,525
Referee: Tual Trainini

19 November 2017
12:30

Stade Français	39–35	Oyonnax (1 BP)
	Report

Stade Jean-Bouin
Attendance: 7,020
Referee: Jérôme Garcès

19 November 2017
16:50

Toulon	29–40	Racing
	Report

Stade Mayol
Attendance: 13,500
Referee: Thomas Charabas

=== Round 11 ===
25 November 2017
14:45

Castres	20–19	Toulon (1 BP)
	Report

Stade Pierre-Fabre
Attendance: 10,117
Referee: Alexandre Ruiz

25 November 2017
18:00

(1 BP) La Rochelle	44–14	Pau
	Report

Stade Marcel-Deflandre
Attendance: 16,000
Referee: Maxime Chalon

25 November 2017
18:00

Bordeaux Bègles	27–27	Brive
	Report

Stade Chaban-Delmas
Attendance: 20,676
Referee: Cédric Marchat

25 November 2017
18:00

Agen	19–13	Stade Français
	Report

Stade Armandie
Attendance: 6,441
Referee: Thomas Charabas

25 November 2017
18:00

Oyonnax	32–32	Clermont
	Report

Stade Charles-Mathon
Attendance: 11,400
Referee: Tual Trainini

26 November 2017
12:30

(1 BP) Racing	26–0	Montpellier
	Report

Stade Olympique Yves-du-Manoir
Attendance: 6,500
Referee: Sébastien Minery

26 November 2017
16:50

Lyon	9–17	Toulouse
	Report

Matmut Stadium de Gerland
Attendance: 14,149
Referee: Ludovic Cayre

=== Round 12 ===
2 December 2017
14:45

La Rochelle	26–14	Montpellier
	Report

Stade Marcel-Deflandre
Attendance: 16,000
Referee: Pierre Brousset

2 December 2017
18:00

Toulouse	31–41	Castres
	Report

Stade Ernest-Wallon
Attendance: 16,206
Referee: Maxime Chalon

2 December 2017
18:00

Brive	33–30	Oyonnax (1 BP)
	Report

Stade Amédée-Domenech
Attendance: 9,448
Referee: Mathieu Raynal

2 December 2017
18:00

Pau	27–17	Bordeaux Bègles
	Report

Stade du Hameau
Attendance: 18,300
Referee: Adrien Descottes

2 December 2017
20:45

(1 BP) Toulon	39–11	Lyon
	Report

Stade Mayol
Attendance: 16,206
Referee: Romain Poite

3 December 2017
12:30

Clermont	35–26	Agen
	Report

Stade Marcel-Michelin
Attendance: 13,950
Referee: Cedric Marchat

3 December 2017
16:50

Stade Français	27–17	Racing
	Report

Stade Jean-Bouin
Attendance: 13,064
Referee: Alexandre Ruiz

=== Round 13 ===
22 December 2017
20:45

Racing	23–19	Toulouse (1 BP)
	Report

U Arena
Attendance: 29,347
Referee: Jérôme Garcès

23 December 2017
14:00

Agen	27–13	Brive
	Report

Stade Armandie
Attendance: 7,705
Referee: Romain Poite

23 December 2017
16:00

Bordeaux Bègles	29–19	La Rochelle
	Report

Matmut Atlantique
Attendance: 36,253
Referee: Thomas Charabas

23 December 2017
18:00

(1 BP) Montpellier	38–17	Lyon
	Report

Altrad Stadium
Attendance: 11,557
Referee: Pascal Gaüzère

23 December 2017
20:45

(1 BP) Castres	28–6	Stade Français
	Report

Stade Pierre-Fabre
Attendance: 9,883
Referee: Ludovic Cayre

23 December 2017
20:45

Pau	22–21	Clermont (1 BP)
	Report

Stade du Hameau
Attendance: 18,000
Referee: Mathieu Raynal

23 December 2017
20:45

(1 BP) Toulon	49–25	Oyonnax
	Report

Stade Mayol
Attendance: 16,647
Referee: Maxime Chalon

=== Round 14 ===
30 December 2017
14:00

(1 BP) La Rochelle	47–6	Agen
	Report

Stade Marcel-Deflandre
Attendance: 16,000
Referee: Alexandre Ruiz

30 December 2017
16:00

(1 BP) Stade Français	22–12	Bordeaux Bègles
	Report

Stade Jean-Bouin
Attendance: 8,025
Referee: Pierre Brousset

30 December 2017
18:00

(1 BP) Brive	29–10	Montpellier
	Report

Stade Amédée-Domenech
Attendance: 9,752
Referee: Adrien Descottes

30 December 2017
18:00

(1 BP) Oyonnax	12–16	Racing
	Report

Stade Charles-Mathon
Attendance: 7,955
Referee: Sébastien Minery

30 December 2017
20:45

Toulouse	18–13	Toulon (1 BP)
	Report

Stade Ernest-Wallon
Attendance: 18,838
Referee: Laurent Cardona

31 December 2017
14:00

Lyon	35–23	Pau
	Report

Matmut Stadium de Gerland
Attendance: 10,069
Referee: Tual Trainini

31 December 2017
16:00

(1 BP) Clermont	27–31	Castres
	Report

Stade Marcel-Michelin
Attendance: 18,648
Referee: Cyril Lafon

=== Round 15 ===
6 January 2018
14:45

Bordeaux Bègles	19–10	Lyon
	Report

Stade Chaban-Delmas
Attendance: 19,185
Referee: Jonathan Dufort

6 January 2018
16:45

Brive	13–12	Toulon (1 BP)
	Report

Stade Amédée-Domenech
Attendance: 10,057
Referee: Pierre Brousset

6 January 2018
18:45

(1 BP) Agen	30–3	Castres
	Report

Stade Armandie
Attendance: 6,440
Referee: Pascal Gaüzère

6 January 2018
18:45

Oyonnax	38–38	La Rochelle
	Report

Stade Charles-Mathon
Attendance: 7,345
Referee: Cédric Marchat

6 January 2018
20:45

(1 BP) Montpellier	28–16	Stade Français
	Report

Altrad Stadium
Attendance: 10,000
Referee: Julien Castaignède

7 January 2018
16:50

Pau	11–10	Toulouse (1 BP)
	Report

Stade du Hameau
Attendance: 18,000
Referee: Alexandre Ruiz

7 January 2018
21:00

(1 BP) Racing	58–6	Clermont
	Report

U Arena
Attendance: 19,263
Referee: Romain Poite

=== Round 16 ===
27 January 2018
14:45

(1 BP) Toulon	36–12	Bordeaux Bègles
	Report

Stade Mayol
Attendance: 15,192
Referee: Mathieu Raynal

27 January 2018
18:00

(1 BP) Toulouse	37–15	Oyonnax
	Report

Stade Ernest-Wallon
Attendance: 10,816
Referee: Thomas Charabas

27 January 2018
18:00

La Rochelle	33–24	Brive
	Report

Stade Marcel-Deflandre
Attendance: 15,856
Referee: Ludovic Cayre

27 January 2018
18:00

(1 BP) Lyon	71–17	Agen
	Report

Matmut Stadium de Gerland
Attendance: 11,986
Referee: Adrien Descottes

27 January 2018
20:45

(1 BP) Castres	13–18	Racing
	Report

Stade Pierre-Fabre
Attendance: 9,525
Referee: Alexandre Ruiz

28 January 2018
12:30

Stade Français	5–40	Pau (1 BP)
	Report

Stade Jean-Bouin
Attendance: 7,780
Referee: Pascal Gaüzère

28 January 2018
16:50

(1 BP) Clermont	29–30	Montpellier
	Report

Stade Marcel-Michelin
Attendance: 18,000
Referee: Jérôme Garcès

=== Round 17 ===
17 February 2018
14:45

(1 BP) Toulon	43–5	Stade Français
	Report

Stade Mayol
Attendance: 15,056
Referee: Cédric Marchat

17 February 2018
18:00

Oyonnax	30–43	Montpellier
	Report

Stade Charles-Mathon
Attendance: 7,450
Referee: Jonathan Dufort

17 February 2018
18:00

(1 BP) Brive	16–21	Pau
	Report

Stade Amédée-Domenech
Attendance: 9,479
Referee: Romain Poite

17 February 2018
18:00

Agen	25–52	Toulouse (1 BP)
	Report

Stade Armandie
Attendance: 10,360
Referee: Mathieu Raynal

17 February 2018
20:45

(1 BP) Lyon	36–10	Clermont
	Report

Matmut Stadium de Gerland
Attendance: 17,375
Referee: Laurent Cardona

18 February 2018
12:30

(1 BP) Bordeaux Bègles	6–7	Castres
	Report

Stade Chaban-Delmas
Attendance: 20,172
Referee: Tual Trainini

18 February 2018
16:50

Racing	19–13	La Rochelle
	Report

U Arena
Attendance: 21,136
Referee: Pierre Brousset

=== Round 18 ===
24 February 2018
14:45

Montpellier	11–10	Bordeaux Bègles (1 BP)
	Report

Altrad Stadium
Attendance: 9,000
Referee: Ludovic Cayre

24 February 2018
18:00

Clermont	12–18	Oyonnax
	Report

Stade Marcel-Michelin
Attendance: 14,000
Referee: Julien Castagnède

24 February 2018
18:00

(1 BP) Stade Français	34–36	Agen
	Report

Stade Jean-Bouin
Attendance: 5,678
Referee: Thomas Charabas

24 February 2018
18:00

Castres	33–22	Lyon
	Report

Stade Pierre-Fabre
Attendance: 9,000
Referee: Sebastien Minery

24 February 2018
20:45

Pau	24–15	Racing
	Report

Stade du Hameau
Attendance: 15,000
Referee: Adrien Descottes

25 February 2018
12:30

(1 BP) Toulouse	45–28	Brive
	Report

Stade Ernest-Wallon
Attendance: 11,434
Referee: Alexandre Ruiz

25 February 2018
16:50

La Rochelle	20–27	Toulon
	Report

Stade Marcel-Deflandre
Attendance: 16,000
Referee: Cyril Lafon

=== Round 19 ===
3 March 2018
14:45

Lyon	15–6	Toulon
	Report

Matmut Stadium de Gerland
Attendance: 16,598
Referee: Jérôme Garcès

3 March 2018
18:00

Racing	17–13	Brive (1 BP)
	Report

U Arena
Attendance: 13,135
Referee: Jonathan Dufort

3 March 2018
18:00

(1 BP) Castres	27–29	Pau
	Report

Stade Pierre-Fabre
Attendance: 9,257
Referee: Mathieu Raynal

3 March 2018
18:00

Agen	31–29	Montpellier (1 BP)
	Report

Stade Armandie
Attendance: 7,066
Referee: Laurent Cardona

3 March 2018
20:45

Bordeaux Bègles	19–25	Toulouse
	Report

Matmut Atlantique
Attendance: 24,000
Referee: Romain Poite

4 March 2018
12:30

Oyonnax	33–27	Stade Français
	Report

Stade Charles-Mathon
Attendance: 7,800
Referee: Tual Trainini

4 March 2018
16:50

Clermont	21–17	La Rochelle (1 BP)
	Report

Stade Marcel-Michelin
Attendance: 17,669
Referee: Pascal Gaüzère

=== Round 20 ===
10 March 2018
14:45

(1 BP) Montpellier	41–3	Racing
	Report

Altrad Stadium
Attendance: 11,221
Referee: Romain Poite

10 March 2018
20:30

(1 BP) Toulon	54–5	Agen
	Report

Stade Mayol
Attendance: 14,241
Referee: Jonathan Dufort

10 March 2018
20:30

Pau	18–15	La Rochelle (1 BP)
	Report

Stade du Hameau
Attendance: 16,000
Referee: Cédric Marchat

10 March 2018
20:30

Bordeaux Bègles	20–26	Oyonnax
	Report

Stade Chaban-Delmas
Attendance: 20,000
Referee: Pierre Brousset

10 March 2018
20:45

(1 BP) Brive	9–11	Clermont
	Report

Stade Amédée-Domenech
Attendance: 12,412
Referee: Adrien Descottes

11 March 2018
12:30

Stade Français	23–17	Castres
	Report

Stade Jean-Bouin
Attendance: 7,340
Referee: Alexandre Ruiz

11 March 2018
16:50

Toulouse	20–27	Lyon
	Report

Stade Ernest-Wallon
Attendance: 13,506
Referee: Tual Trainini

=== Round 21 ===
17 March 2018
14:45

Racing	28–22	Stade Français
	Report

U Arena
Attendance: 20,063
Referee: Mathieu Raynal

17 March 2018
20:30

(1 BP) Agen	10–15	Bordeaux Bègles
	Report

Stade Armandie
Attendance: 7,751
Referee: Cyril Lafon

17 March 2018
20:30

La Rochelle	19–15	Lyon (1 BP)
	Report

Stade Marcel-Deflandre
Attendance: 16,000
Referee: Thomas Charabas

17 March 2018
20:30

Oyonnax	29–26	Toulon (1 BP)
	Report

Stade Charles-Mathon
Attendance: 9,312
Referee: Romain Poite

17 March 2018
20:45

(1 BP) Clermont	38–14	Pau
	Report

Stade Marcel-Michelin
Attendance: 16,559
Referee: Sebastien Minery

18 March 2018
12:30

Castres	37–28	Brive
	Report

Stade Pierre-Fabre
Attendance: 8,878
Referee: Laurent Cardona

18 March 2018
16:50

Toulouse	22–14	Montpellier
	Report

Stade Ernest-Wallon
Attendance: 15,306
Referee: Adrien Descottes

=== Round 22 ===
24 March 2018
14:45

(1 BP) La Rochelle	31–20	Bordeaux Bègles
	Report

Stade Marcel-Deflandre
Attendance: 16,000
Referee: Tual Trainini

24 March 2018
16:45

(2 BP) Stade Français	33–37	Toulouse (1 BP)
	Report

Stade Jean-Bouin
Attendance: 13,439
Referee: Romain Poite

24 March 2018
18:45

Brive	15–12	Agen (1 BP)
	Report

Stade Amédée-Domenech
Attendance: 10,133
Referee: Mathieu Raynal

24 March 2018
18:45

(1 BP) Pau	33–12	Oyonnax
	Report

Stade du Hameau
Attendance: 11,289
Referee: Alexandre Ruiz

24 March 2018
20:50

(1 BP) Montpellier	45–7	Castres
	Report

Altrad Stadium
Attendance: 10,000
Referee: Pascal Gauzere

25 March 2018
16:50

(1 BP) Toulon	49–0	Clermont
	Report

Stade Mayol
Attendance: 17,209
Referee: Laurent Cardona

25 March 2018
21:00

(1 BP) Lyon	22–24	Racing
	Report

Matmut Stadium de Gerland
Attendance: 12,724
Referee: Pierre Brousset

=== Round 23 ===
7 April 2018
14:45

Castres	28–23	Toulouse (1 BP)
	Report

Stade Pierre-Fabre
Attendance: 12,258
Referee: Alexandre Ruiz

7 April 2018
17:45

(1 BP) Stade Français	50–13	Clermont
	Report

Stade Jean-Bouin
Attendance: 15,350
Referee: Thomas Charabas

7 April 2018
17:45

Bordeaux Bègles	19–18	Pau (1 BP)
	Report

Stade Chaban Delmas
Attendance: 19,729
Referee: Cyril Lafon

7 April 2018
17:45

(1 BP) Brive	25–27	Lyon
	Report

Stade Amédée-Domenech
Attendance: 12,077
Referee: Romain Poite

7 April 2018
20:45

(1 BP) Agen	36–21	Oyonnax
	Report

Stade Armandie
Attendance: 8,500
Referee: Jerome Garces

8 April 2018
12:30

(1 BP) Montpellier	40–24	La Rochelle
	Report

Altrad Stadium
Attendance: 12,392
Referee: Mathieu Raynal

8 April 2018
16:50

Racing	17–13	Toulon (1 BP)
	Report

U Arena
Attendance: 25,000
Referee: Pascal Gauzere

=== Round 24 ===
14 April 2018
14:45

(1 BP) Toulon	32 – 17	Montpellier
	Report

Stade Vélodrome, Marseille
Attendance: 42,000
Referee: Romain Poite

14 April 2018
18:00

Clermont	33 – 3	Bordeaux Bègles
	Report

Stade Marcel-Michelin
Attendance: 15,645
Referee: Cedric Marchat

14 April 2018
18:00

(1 BP) Oyonnax	40 – 17	Brive
	Report

Stade Charles-Mathon
Attendance: 10,362
Referee: Pascal Gauzere

14 April 2018
18:00

Pau	22 – 33	Agen (1 BP)
	Report

Stade du Hameau
Attendance: 14,878
Referee: Tual Trainini

14 April 2018
20:45

(1 BP) Lyon	44 – 3	Stade Français
	Report

Matmut Stadium de Gerland
Attendance: 14,900
Referee: Laurent Cardona

15 April 2018
12:30

La Rochelle	18 – 26	Castres
	Report

Stade Marcel-Deflandre
Attendance: 16,000
Referee: Jerome Garces

15 April 2018
16:50

(1 BP) Toulouse	42 – 27	Racing
	Report

Stade Ernest-Wallon
Attendance: 18,838
Referee: Mathieu Raynal

=== Round 25 ===
28 April 2018
14:45

(1 BP) Toulon	52 – 13	Castres
	Report

Stade Mayol
Attendance: 18,131
Referee: Mathieu Raynal

28 April 2018
20:45

Agen	27 – 17	Clermont
	Report

Stade Armandie
Attendance: 12,517
Referee: Julien Castaignede

28 April 2018
20:45

(1 BP) Montpellier	45 – 13	Pau
	Report

Altrad Stadium
Attendance: 11,112
Referee: Sebastien Minery

28 April 2018
20:45

(1 BP) Oyonnax	39 – 18	Lyon
	Report

Stade Charles Mathon
Attendance: 11,398
Referee: Alexandre Ruiz

28 April 2018
20:45

(1 BP) Stade Français	30 – 20	Brive
	Report

Stade Jean-Bouin
Attendance: 15,000
Referee: Jerome Garces

29 April 2018
12:30

Bordeaux Bègles	15 – 39	Racing (1 BP)
	Report

Stade Chaban-Delmas
Attendance: 18,251
Referee: Ludovic Cayre

29 April 2018
16:50

Toulouse	19 – 14	La Rochelle (1 BP)
	Report

Stade Ernest-Wallon
Attendance: 18,838
Referee: Romain Poite

=== Round 26 ===
5 May 2018
21:00

(1 BP) Brive	24 – 22	Bordeaux Bègles (1 BP)
	Report

Stade Amédée-Domenech
Attendance: 10,561
Referee: Jonathan Dufort

5 May 2018
21:00

(1 BP) Castres	54 – 3	Oyonnax
	Report

Stade Pierre-Fabre
Attendance: 12,073
Referee: Romain Poite

5 May 2018
21:00

(1 BP) La Rochelle	31 – 7	Stade Français
	Report

Stade Marcel-Deflandre
Attendance: 15,895
Referee: Adrien Descottes

5 May 2018
21:00

(1 BP) Lyon	32 – 24	Montpellier
	Report

Matmut Stadium de Gerland
Attendance: 19,205
Referee: Mathieu Raynal

5 May 2018
21:00

(1 BP) Pau	38 – 27	Toulon (1 BP)
	Report

Stade du Hameau
Attendance: 18,220
Referee: Laurent Cardona

5 May 2018
21:00

(1 BP) Racing	42 – 13	Agen
	Report

Stade de la Rabine, Vannes
Attendance: 7,556
Referee: Pierre Brousset

5 May 2018
21:00

Clermont	36 – 26	Toulouse (1 BP)
	Report

Stade Marcel-Michelin
Attendance: 18,801
Referee: Tual Trainini

== Relegation playoff ==
The team finishing in 13th place faces the runner-up of the Pro D2, with the winner of this match playing in Top 14 in 2018–19 and the loser in Pro D2.

12 May 2018
14:45

Grenoble	47–22	Oyonnax
Try: Visinia (2) 8' c, 68' c Mélé 11' c Oz 33' c Taumalolo 38' c Guillemin 65' m Mas 77' c Con: Mélé (4/4) 9', 11', 34', 39'; Pourteau (1/2) 69'; Francis (1/1) 78'	Report	Try: Ikpefan (2) 21' c, 51' c Müller 80+1' m Con: Botica (2/2) 22', 52'; Pen: Botica (1/1) 15'

Stade des Alpes, Grenoble
Attendance: 18,500
Referee: Laurent Cardona

Grenoble won and were promoted to Top 14, while Oyonnax were relegated to Pro D2.

== Playoffs ==
Semi-final Qualifiers
4	Toulon	19
5	Lyon (a.e.t.)	19
3	Toulouse	11
6	Castres	23

Semi-finals
1	Montpellier	40
5	Lyon	14
2	Racing 92	14
6	Castres	19

Final
1	Montpellier	13
6	Castres	29

=== Semi-final Qualifiers ===
18 May 2018
21:00

Toulon	19–19 (a.e.t.)	Lyon
Try: Ashton 56' c Con: Belleau (1/1) 56'; Pen: Belleau (2/3) 37', 50'; Trinh-Duc (2/2) 69', 82'	Report	Try: Arnold 64' m Cretin 69' m Pen: Harris (3/3) 24', 32', 93'

Stade Mayol
Attendance: 18,200
Referee: Mathieu Raynal

- Under LNR rules, when a playoff game ends level after extra time, the first tiebreaker is tries scored. Lyon advanced with 2 tries to Toulon's 1.

19 May 2018
16:15

Toulouse	11–23	Castres
Try: Ghiraldini 60' m Pen: Ramos (2/4) 16', 20'	Report	Try: Batlle (2) 12' c, 44' c Con: Urdapilleta (2/2) 13', 45'; Pen: Kockott (2/3) 25', 48'; Urdapilleta (1/1) 35'

Stade Ernest-Wallon
Attendance: 18,800
Referee: Romain Poite

=== Semi-finals ===
25 May 2018
21:00

Montpellier	40–14	Lyon
Try: Nadolo 24' c Dumoulin 38' c Picamoles 48' c Willemse 72' c Con: Pienaar (4/4) 25', 39', 49', 73'; Pen: Pienaar (3/3) 4', 18', 43'; Steyn (1/1) 14'	Report	Try: Harris 78' m Pen: Harris (3/3) 10', 23', 29'

Groupama Stadium, Décines-Charpieu
Attendance: 58,664
Referee: Pascal Gaüzère

26 May 2018
16:45

Racing 92	14–19	Castres
Try: Imhoff 19' c Dupichot 25' c Con: Iribaren (2/2) 20', 26'	Report	Try: Vaipulu 8' c Con: Urdapilleta (1/1) 9'; Pen: Urdapilleta (4/5) 11', 33', 40+1', 64'

Groupama Stadium, Décines-Charpieu
Attendance: 56,272
Referee: Alexandre Ruiz

=== Final ===
2 June 2018
20:45

Montpellier	13–29	Castres
Try: Penalty try 55'; Pen: Steyn (1/2) 12'; Pienaar (1/3) 34'	Report	Try: Dumora 39' c Mafi 76' c Con: Urdapilleta (2/2) 40', 77'; Pen: Urdapilleta (5/5) 8', 15', 19', 30', 62'

Stade de France, Saint-Denis
Attendance: 78,442
Referee: Jérôme Garcès

== Leading scorers ==
Note: Flags to the left of player names indicate national team as has been defined under World Rugby eligibility rules, or primary nationality for players who have not yet earned international senior caps. Players may hold one or more non-WR nationalities.

=== Top points scorers ===
Rank	Player	Club	Points
1	(New Zealand) Ben Botica	Oyonnax	315
2	(Argentina) Benjamín Urdapilleta	Castres	297
3	(France) Thomas Ramos	Toulouse	277
4	(South Africa) Ruan Pienaar	Montpellier	193
5	(France) Jules Plisson	Stade Français	184
6	(New Zealand) Tom Taylor	Pau	181
7	(France) Anthony Belleau	Toulon	180
8	(Australia) Jake McIntyre	Agen	179
9	(France) Lionel Beauxis	Lyon	167
10	(France) Morgan Parra	Clermont	142

=== Top try scorers ===
Rank	Player	Club	Tries
1	(England) Chris Ashton	Toulon	24
2	(Fiji) Nemani Nadolo	Montpellier	19
3	(New Zealand) Toby Arnold	Lyon	12
3	(France) Armand Batlle	Castres	12
3	(France) Julien Dumora	Castres	12
3	(France) Louis Picamoles	Montpellier	12
7	(Argentina) Juan Imhoff	Racing 92	11
7	(Fiji) Waisea Nayacalevu	Stade Français	11
7	(Fiji) Watisoni Votu	Pau	11
10	(France) Baptiste Couilloud	Lyon	10
10	(France) Yoann Huget	Toulouse	10
10	(South Africa) Cheslin Kolbe	Toulouse	10
10	(Fiji) Josua Tuisova	Toulon	10

== Attendances ==
- Attendances do not include the semi-finals or final as these are at neutral venues.

Club	Home Games	Total	Average	Highest	Lowest	% Capacity
Agen	13	102,345	7,873	12,517	6,104	56%
Bordeaux Bègles	13	285,432	21,956	36,253	18,251	60%
Brive	13	134,574	10,352	12,412	9,447	74%
Castres	13	130,036	10,003	12,258	8,691	80%
Clermont	13	222,101	17,085	18,801	13,950	90%
La Rochelle	13	206,751	15,904	16,000	15,000	99%
Lyon	13	184,041	14,157	19,205	10,069	57%
Montpellier	13	144,589	11,122	15,034	8,928	71%
Oyonnax	13	114,775	8,829	11,400	7,345	77%
Pau	13	184,105	14,162	18,300	10,000	77%
Racing 92	13	172,581	13,275	29,347	5,830	62%
Stade Francais	13	139,175	10,706	15,350	5,678	54%
Toulon (Note: Toulon's attendance figure includes home semi-final qualifier play-off game.)	14	250,116	17,865	42,000	13,500	86%
Toulouse (Note: Toulouse's attendance figure includes home semi-final qualifier play-off game.)	14	217,835	15,560	18,838	10,816	80%

== See also ==
- 2017–18 Rugby Pro D2 season
