= Alexandre Ruiz =

French rugby union referee

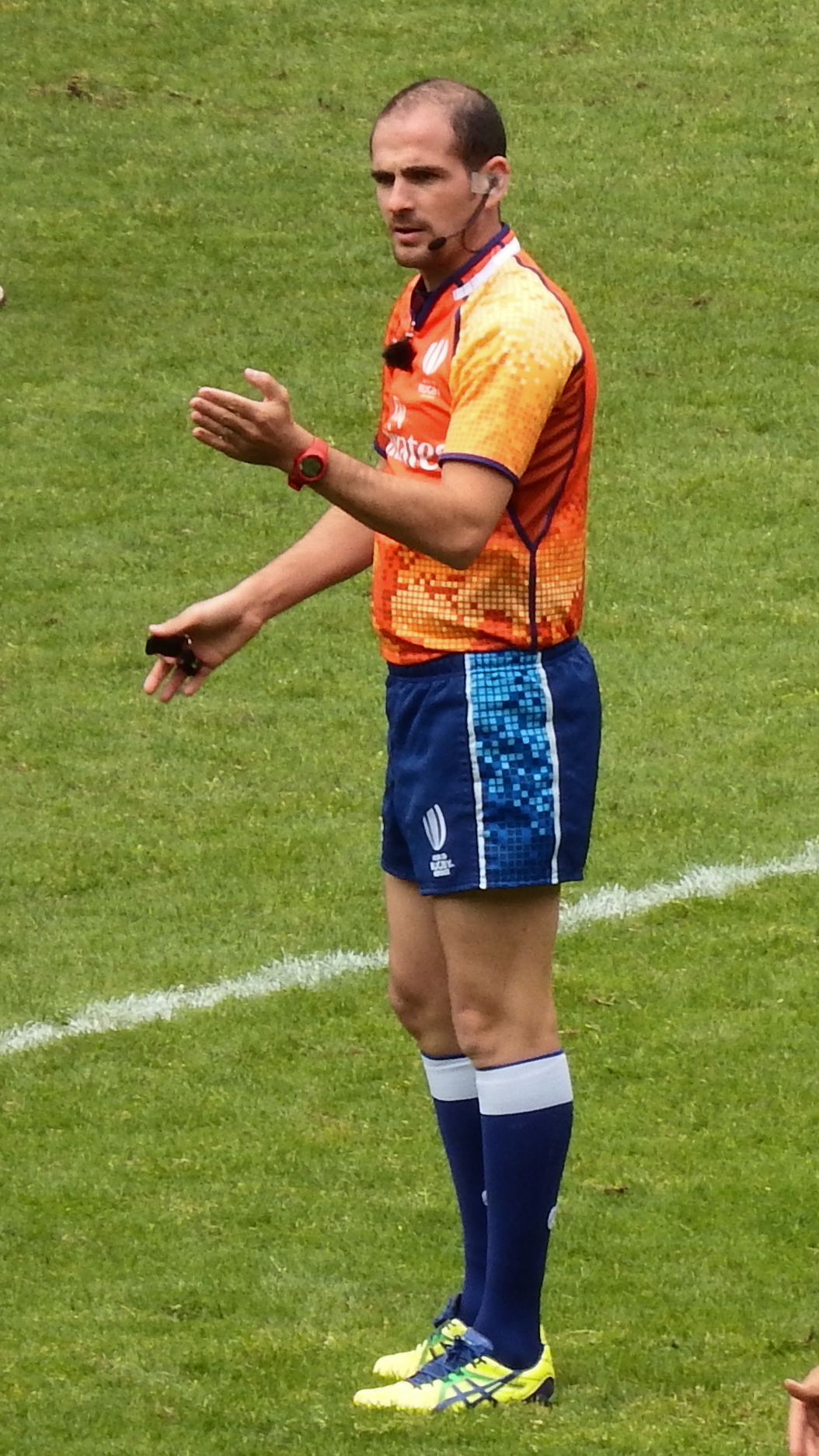
- Born: Alexandre Ruiz; 24 March 1987 (age 39) Béziers, France

Rugby union career
Refereeing career
Years	Competition	Apps
2012–2016	World Sevens Series	
2013–	Top 14	62
2013	RWC 7's	1
2013–	Challenge Cup	13
2014	Pro12	1
2014–	Test matches	7
2016–	Champions Cup	4
2016	Olympic 7's	1

Alexandre Ruiz (born 24 March 1987) is a professional rugby union referee who represents the French Rugby Federation. He is a regular appointment at Top 14 and has recently joined the top level of European Rugby.

== Referee career ==
Ruiz started officiating in 2006 at the age of 19 and quickly went through the ranks in France. By 2010 he was a referee at Rugby Pro D2 level, the second tier of club rugby in France, before earning assistant referee roles at Top 14 level in 2011. In March 2012, Ruiz made his World Sevens Series debut, debuting during the 2012 Hong Kong Sevens. He remained on the panel for the rest of that season and became a regular appointment from the 2012–13 season onward.

In January 2013, Ruiz made his Top 14 debut, taking charge of Stade Montois's home game against Toulouse. That same year, he was selected to officiate in the 2013 Rugby World Cup Sevens in Russia. In late 2013, he made his European debut, refereeing Mogliano against Bath in the 2013–14 European Challenge Cup. In January 2014, Ruiz became the first French referee to officiate a Pro12 match, taking charge of the Italian derby between Zebre and Benetton Treviso.

Ruiz first international match came on 22 February 2014, between Georgia and Russia during the 2012–14 European Nations Cup First Division. In June 2014, Ruiz was selected for the 2014 IRB Junior World Championship in New Zealand, which included three appointments; Ireland v Fiji, New Zealand v South Africa and the Bronze Final between Ireland and New Zealand.

In November 2014, Ruiz was appointed to three test matches as assistant referee, including two Tier 1 v Tier 1 internationals. June 2015 saw Ruiz get his first semi-final in the Top 14 - Clermont against Toulouse. This was backed up by being part of the 2015 World Rugby Nations Cup referee panel in June and the 2015 World Rugby Pacific Nations Cup panel in July. This included the 5th Place play-off match between rivals United States and Canada.

In January 2016, Ruiz refereed his first Champions Cup match, taking charge of Benetton Treviso's home game against Munster during the 2015–16 European Rugby Champions Cup. A couple weeks later, Ruiz had his first Six Nations Championship appointment, acting as assistant referee to Romain Poite for England vs Ireland. During the 2016 Hong Kong Sevens in April 2016, Ruiz refereed his 100th World Series match.

In June 2016, he refereed his first test match that included a Tier 1 nation, taking charge of Canada's home clash against Italy on 26 June. After that test, he went on to referee at the 2016 Olympic games in Brazil, which included an appointment to the Bronze medal game between Japan and South Africa.

Ruiz refereed in South Africa where he refereed two Currie Cup games during September 2016.
