= Pierre Brousset =

French rugby union referee

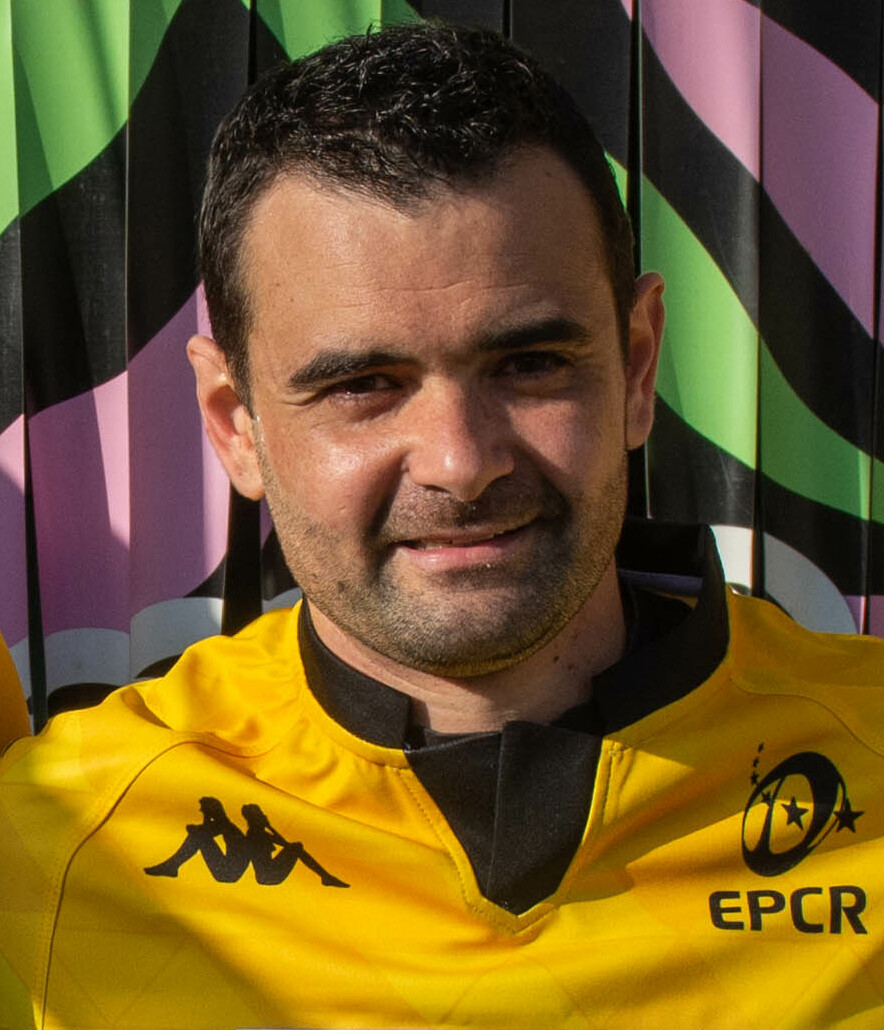
- Born: 15 January 1989 (age 37) Rieumes, France

Rugby union career
Refereeing career
Years	Competition	Apps
2016–	Top 14	67
2022–	United Rugby Championship	1

Pierre Brousset (born 15 January 1989) is a French rugby referee.

== Career ==
Brousset began as a semi-professional referee in 2014 and has been refereeing in the French Top 14 since the 2016–17 Top 14 season. He has been a regular referee in the European Rugby Champions Cup and EPCR Challenge Cup also. He made his debut refereeing in the 2021–22 United Rugby Championship, refereeing the match between Benetton and Connacht, becoming the 8th Frenchman to referee in the competition.
