= Benjamín Urdapilleta =

Argentine rugby union player (born 1986)

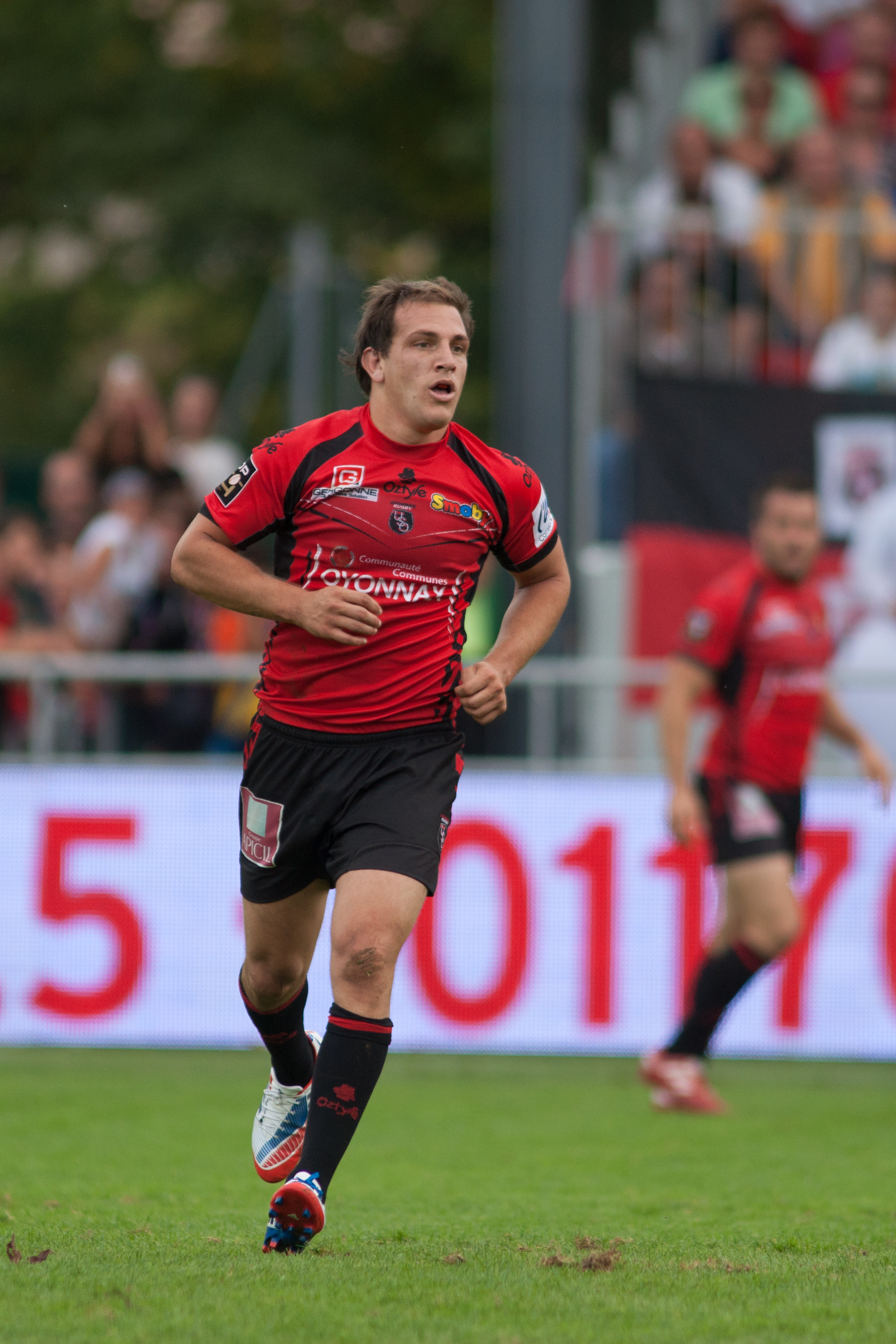
- Born: Benjamín María Urdapilleta; March 11, 1986 (age 40) Buenos Aires, Argentina
- Height: 1.78 m (5 ft 10 in)
- Weight: 90 kg (14 st 2 lb; 198 lb)

Rugby union career
- Position: Fly-half / Centre
Senior career
Years	Team	Apps	(Points)
2010	Pampas XV	5	(17)
2010–2012	Harlequins	15	(20)
2012–2015	Oyonnax	76	(789)
2015–2023	Castres	178	(1,787)
2023–2025	Clermont	47	(291)
2025–	Perpignan	13	(101)
- Correct as of 19 September 2026
International career
Years	Team	Apps	(Points)
2007–	Argentina	18	(43)
- Correct as of 18 September 2022

Benjamín Urdapilleta (born March 11, 1986) is an Argentine rugby union footballer who plays for USA Perpignan in the Top 14. He has played in both the centre and the flyhalf positions. His test debut for Argentina was in 2008 when he played against South Africa in Johannesburg. He signed for the Harlequins in March 2010. During the 2016–17 season he played for Castres Olympique. In the final of the 2017–18 Top 14 season he converted two tries and scored five penalties as Castres defeated Montpellier.

== Honours ==
=== Club ===
Castres:

- Top 14: 2017–18
