= Stade Pierre-Fabre =

Rugby stadium in Castres, France

Coordinates: 43°36′39″N 2°15′10″E

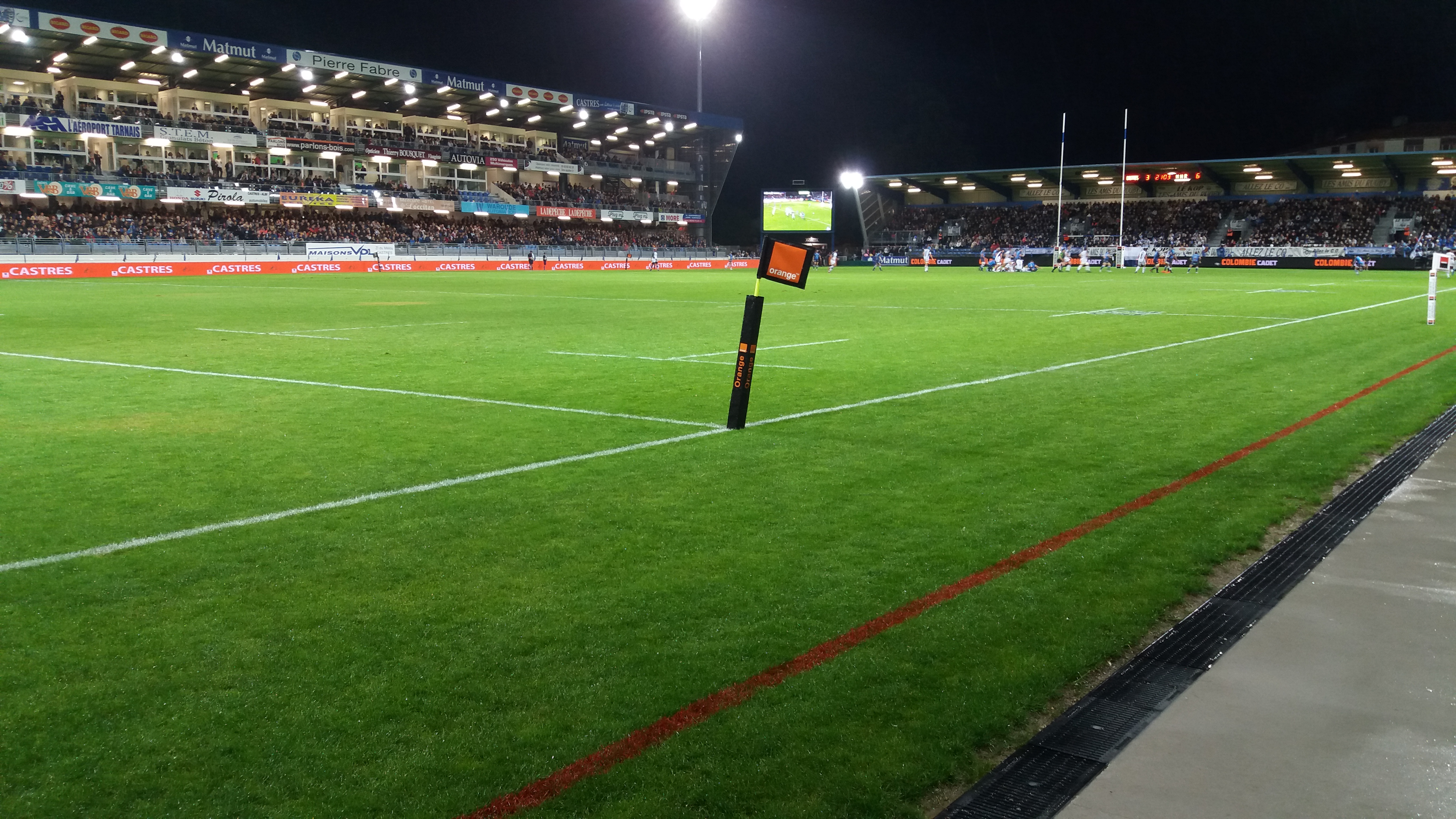
- Interactive map of Stade Pierre-Fabre
- Former names: Stade Pierre-Antoine
- Location: Castres, France
- Capacity: 12,300
- Surface: grass

Construction
- Opened: 1907
- Expanded: 2005, 2008, 2014 and 2017

Tenant
- Castres Olympique

Stade Pierre-Fabre, formerly known as Stade Pierre-Antoine, is a multi-purpose stadium in Castres, France. It is currently used mostly for rugby union matches and is the home stadium of Castres Olympique. The stadium is able to hold 12,300 spectators, one of the smallest in Top 14.

== Overview ==
The stadium is currently named after Pierre Fabre, the late pharmaceutical magnate who owned Castres Olympique from 1988 until his death in 2013. The venue was renamed during ceremonies held in conjunction with Castres' Top 14 match against Montpellier on 9 September 2017.
