= Stade du Hameau =

Stadium in Pau, France

- Le Hameau
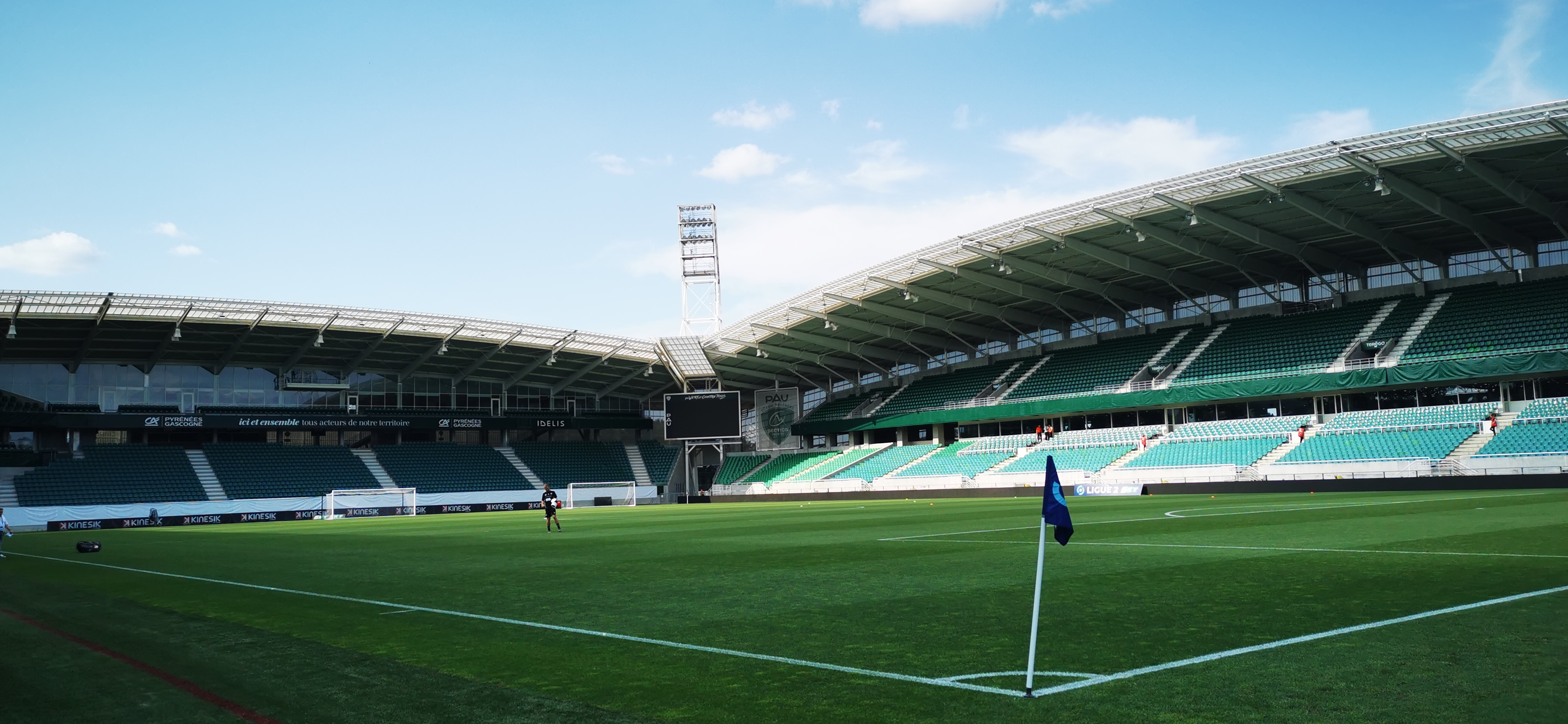
- Interactive map of Stade du Hameau
- Full name: Stade du Hameau
- Former names: Stade Olympique du Hameau
- Location: Pau, France
- Coordinates: 43°18′34″N 0°19′1″W
- Owner: City of Pau, France
- Capacity: 14,588
- Surface: Hybrid grass
- Field size: 120 m × 70 m (390 ft × 230 ft)

Construction
- Groundbreaking: 1948
- Opened: 1948
- Renovated: 1988, 2017
- Expanded: Ossau Stand (2015); Crédit Agricole North Stand (2017); Teréga East Stand (2017)
- Cost: €15.6m
- Architect: Julien Camborde

Tenants
- Section Paloise (1991–); Pau FC (1991–2018, 2020–2021)

Stade du Hameau (French pronunciation: [stad dy a.mo]) is a versatile stadium and sports convention center located in Pau, France. The construction started in 1948 and the stadium has been owned by the city of Pau since 1983, when it was transferred from the French army. The primary use of this stadium is for rugby union matches, serving as the home ground for the French club Section Paloise.

The stadium has a seating capacity of 14,588, though this number has been reduced after the removal of the Ossau stand. It has been hosting Section Paloise's rugby matches since 1991, before which they played at the Stade de la Croix du Prince since 1910.

Significant renovations were carried out in 1988, and Pau FC, the local football club, also used the stadium for a time starting in 1991. In 2017, the Stade du Hameau underwent a major transformation, enhancing its aesthetics with distinctive roofing on the North and East stands. This renovation gave the stadium a more modern and elegant appearance.

Pau FC eventually moved to their own stadium at Nouste Camp in 2018 but had to return to the Hameau during the first half of the 2020-2021 season while their new stadium met Ligue 2 standards. Additionally, the Hameau hosts various sporting and cultural events, including the 2018–19 Pro D2 final.

In terms of capacity, the Stade du Hameau is the largest stadium in Pyrénées-Atlantiques, surpassing the Stade Jean-Dauger in Bayonne and the Parc des sports d'Aguiléra in Biarritz. It also ranks as the third-largest stadium in the Nouvelle-Aquitaine region, just below the Matmut Atlantique and Chaban-Delmas stadiums in Bordeaux.

== Opening ==
Stade du Hameau was initially constructed as a military stadium to house the National Military Physical Training School, which had to relocate from Paris at the outset of World War II. Colonel de Fornel spearheaded this initiative, and the stadium was completed in 1948.

The official inauguration of the stadium occurred after World War II, on 9 October 1949. René Lehmann, the head of sports at L'Aurore, estimated the stadium's seating capacity at 100,000, lauding it as an "architectural marvel." He drew a comparison to the Stade Yves-du-Manoir, which was in dire need of investment during that period.

On that day, Papa Gallo Thiam achieved a notable feat by surpassing the French high jump record previously held by Georges Damitio, clearing 1.99 meters. Distinguished athletes like Étienne Bally, Étienne Gailly, and André Mourlon were also in attendance, with André Mourlon failing to break his own record.

In 1957, the stadium was renamed in honor of its creator, becoming known as the Colonel de Fornel Stadium.

== History ==
=== Military stadium ===
In 1950, Colonel de Fornel organized the World Military Championships at Stade du Hameau. It was also in the same year that the first rugby match was played at this stadium, with the French military rugby union team facing the Royal Air Force Rugby Union, resulting in a victory for the French team with a score of 8 to 3. In 1951, the French Air Force and the French Army played a rugby union match.

On 26 December 1951, the first international rugby league match took place at the stadium, where New Zealand's national team, the "Kiwis," defeated a selection of players from the Basque, Béarn, and Bigorre regions with a score of 32 to 12. This match drew a crowd of approximately 20,000 spectators, making it the largest attendance in the stadium's history for a rugby league match.

The stadium's use gradually shifted to accommodate various sports associations in Pau starting in 1954, as the city experienced economic growth with the exploitation of the Lacq gas field, following an agreement with the Ministry of Defense.

In early 1956, Colonel de Fornel died, and the "National Military Physical Training School" was relocated to Antibes shortly after. In 1957, the stadium was officially renamed the "Colonel de Fornel Stadium" in honor of its creator.

Starting from 1960, the Hameau stadium was occupied by the 1st Parachute Chasseur Regiment for six years. Football-Club de Pau, established on 16 May 1959, became the first sports club to use the stadium from 1960 onwards, winning their inaugural match against Rochefort with a score of 5 to 1.

However, over time, the stadium became underutilized and began to be considered a white elephant in an outlying area of the city.

In 1965, the city of Pau explored the possibility of constructing a new municipal stadium at Cami Salié, but the project did not materialize. Rugby league made a comeback in Pau in 1972 with AS Pau Béarn joining the National Division 1. Stade du Hameau hosted matches, including one in November 1972 during the Rugby League World Cup between Great Britain and New Zealand, with an attendance of 8,000 spectators.

In 1980, the stadium was officially named "Colonel de Fornel Stadium" by Generals Pottier and Fayette. Renovation work began in the 1970s and continued into the mid-1980s, including the construction of a concierge's office, new stands, and improvements to the playing field.

Stadium ownership was finally transferred to the city of Pau in 1983.

=== Section Paloise ===
In August 1990, the city's rugby union club, Section Paloise, left their historic Stade de la Croix du Prince to move to Stade du Hameau. The first match at Stade du Hameau took place on 18 August 1990, where Section paloise faced Bègles-Bordeaux in the Challenge Du Manoir, losing 0-12.

The stadium's maximum capacity, estimated at around 13,000 spectators before the 2017 renovation, saw some of its highest attendances during events such as a 1993–94 Coupe de France match between Pau Football Club and AS Saint-Étienne and the 2013 semi-final promotion match between Section Paloise and Stade Rochelais.

In the early 2010s, it became clear that the Stade du Hameau needed substantial renovation, 20 years after its initial renovation. Various proposals for a new stadium were discussed, but ultimately, François Bayrou, the mayor of Pau, chose to renovate the existing stadium.

During the 2014-2015 season, the stadium received a temporary stand with approximately 400 seats, adjacent to the Auchan stand. This stand was removed at the end of the season, and work began on a temporary stand with a capacity of 2,996 seats behind the goalposts. This new stand consisted of a covered central section with 1,212 seats, complemented by two uncovered side stands. There was controversy when season ticket holders realized that safety barriers obstructed much of their view. These developments aimed to eventually increase the stadium's capacity to 18,426 seats, including 17,000 seated.

The renovation, led by local architect Julien Camborde, was completed in 2017 at a cost of 15.6 million euros. The stadium's capacity was increased to 18,324 seats, including 3,000 temporary seats and 1,500 corporate boxes. The stadium now has a "U" shape, and there are plans to add another stand to enclose it and create an oval, fulfilling Colonel de Fornel's vision from 1949. With this newly renovated facility, Section Paloise entered a new era, increasing the number of seated places from 6,600 to 17,300 in less than three seasons, with a total capacity of 18,426 spectators.

The first phase of the renovation began in December 2016, with the North stand being completed at the start of the 2017/2018 season, featuring three levels with private boxes, a reception area, and a brewery. The delivery of the honor stand, 25 meters high, marked the end of construction in late November 2017.

François Bayrou, the mayor of Pau, mentioned the possibility of adding the final side stand if Section Paloise had a successful season.

The last match for Pau FC at this stadium was played against Red Star Football Club on 10 May 2018. Pau Football Club left the stadium in 2018 to move to Nouste Camp.

On 22 February 2019, it hosted a Six Nations Under 20s Championship match between France and Scotland with France winning 42–27.

== Architectural feature ==
One distinctive feature of the stadium is its outer protection with a double skin to limit wind exposure, enhancing spectator comfort and reducing wind-related disturbances during matches. The vast esplanade overlooking the field allows spectators to enjoy warm-ups and matches from a bar integrated into the 800-square-meter space.

- 1988 Renovation: Stade du Hameau underwent its first renovation in 1988 to accommodate Section Paloise after the abandonment of the Stade de la Croix Du Prince. The Main Stand was brought up to standards, and the field was reseeded. Additionally, a new front stand was constructed.
- 2017 Renovation: The renovation, led by local architect Julien Camborde, was distinctive in that it extended the stadium from the existing structure without demolishing it. The Main and East stands were enclosed, and a third North stand was built to form a U shape. The goal was to preserve the Hameau's character by retaining the historic East and Main stands while creating new hospitality spaces (bodega, bars, corporate boxes, etc.).

The renovation was carried out without interrupting matches, with the stadium remaining in use.

The exterior of the stadium now features a translucent white cladding to provide architectural unity and allow light to pass through.

Key phases of the renovation included the construction of additional seats in the East Stand (Teréga) in the lower part, completed in August 2017; the construction of the CA Pyrénées Gascogne Stand in place of the old earth mound, completed in July 2017; and the elevation of the East Stand (Teréga), completed in December 2017. A fourth phase, involving the reconstruction of the Ossau Stand, is currently under consideration.

== Financial aspects ==
=== One of the most economical stadiums in France ===
The renovation of Stade du Hameau makes it one of the most economical stadiums in France, with the cost of the works amounting to around 15 million euros, representing less than 2,000 € / seat. This budget should be compared with other similar projects in France, where the average price per seat is generally between €4,000 and €6,000 .

Initially estimated at 12 million euros, the renovation will have cost 15.6 million euros excluding tax, of which 2 million euros for the city of Pau, 8.1 million euros for the Pau urban community, 2.5 million euros for the region and 3 million euros for the department1.

== Atmosphere ==
The stadium has been described as one of the "most intimidating stadiums in world rugby".

The first time I played for Leicester away in France was pretty bad. It was against Pau at the Stade du Hameau in 1996. The crowd were throwing stones and coins at us on the pitch, but the Leicester team at that time was so feisty, they actually would have liked to have got into the stands and had a fight with everyone. We eventually won 19-14. The other game that stands out for me was against Neath at the Gnoll. I very rarely played in Wales during my career - probably only 10 times in total - but I remember the game against Neath being particularly hostile, particularly when I scored a try under the posts. People were throwing all sorts at me.

— Austin Healey, The most intimidating stadiums in world rugby - as chosen by our experts

== Famous meetings ==
=== Athletics ===
Papa Gallo Thiam beats the French high jump record held by Georges Damitio with a bar of 1m99, on 9 October 1949 at the inauguration of the stadium, and would go on to become the first Frenchman to cross 2m in the high jump.

=== Rugby League ===
In November 1972, Great Britain, coached by Jim Challinor beat New Zealand 43 to 13 in the 1972 Rugby League World Cup in front of 8,000 spectators.

At that time the stadium, still a military stadium, had only one main stand, supplemented by removable bleachers.

=== Football ===
In football, since the first renovation in 1988, AS Saint-Étienne, Nîmes Olympique, AS Cannes (then coached by Luis Fernandez) or Paris Saint-Germain (round of 16 of the 1997–98 Coupe de France and 2019–20 Coupe de France).

During Pau FC's run in the French Cup 2019-2020, the club played its 2 home matches against Ligue 1 teams, Girondins de Bordeaux and PSG, beating the attendance record in football configuration with 16700 people.

The France Espoirs team also played in the stadium, in a friendly match against Switzerland on 12 March 1997. Among the young French players present that day were Patrick Vieira, Thierry Henry and David Trezeguet.

Michel Platini also played at the Hameau on the occasion of Dominique Vésir's jubilee in 1988.

The Pau Football Club also played its home games there until 2018. Since the 2018-2019 season, it has been playing in a new stadium dedicated to football and located just a few hundred metres from the Hameau stadium.

=== Rugby Union ===
Section Paloise is a historic club in French rugby with regular participation at the top of the pyramid of divisions, including the Top 16, then the Top 14. The best French teams therefore travel regularly to the Hameau.

In 2014, in front of 8,500 spectators, the French women's rugby team won the Grand Slam by beating Ireland in the last match of the Six Nations Tournament.

- Women's Six Nations Championship

The French women's rugby team received Ireland in a match of the Six Nations Women's Tournament in 2012 and 2014.

In 2020, England earned a hard-fought 19-13 victory over France at Stade du Hameau.

- Six Nations Under 20s Championship

In 2016, France under-20 beat England in a packed stadium.

On 22 February 2019, the Agglomeration will co-host a match of the Six Nations Rugby Under 20 Tournament between France, world champion, and Scotland.

European Rugby Cup

On 9 November 1997, Section paloise beat Leicester Tigers 35-18 in the quarter-finals of the 1997–98 Heineken Cup.

== Gallery ==
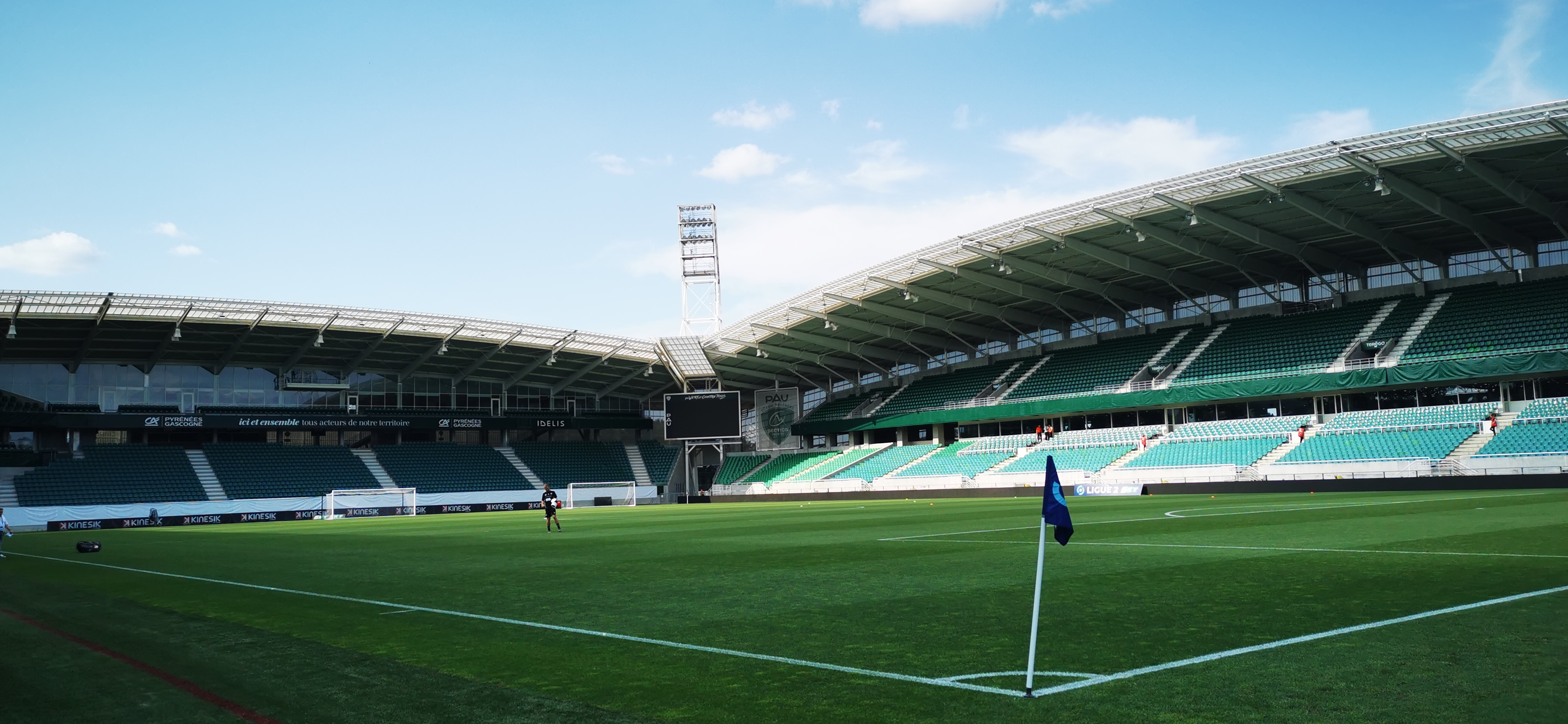
Stade du Hameau in 2022

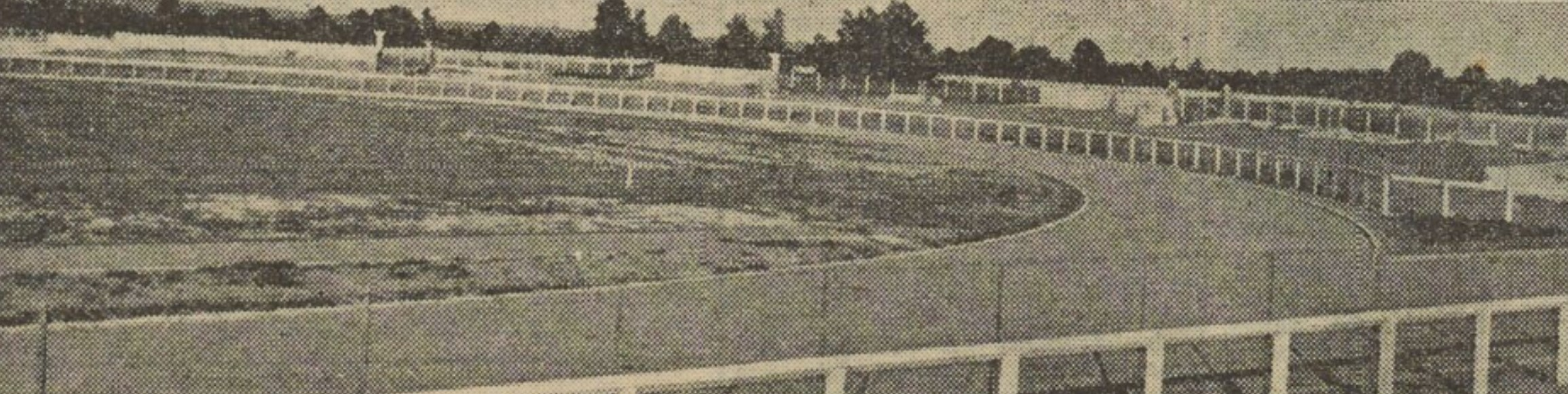
Stade du Hameau 1949 in 1949

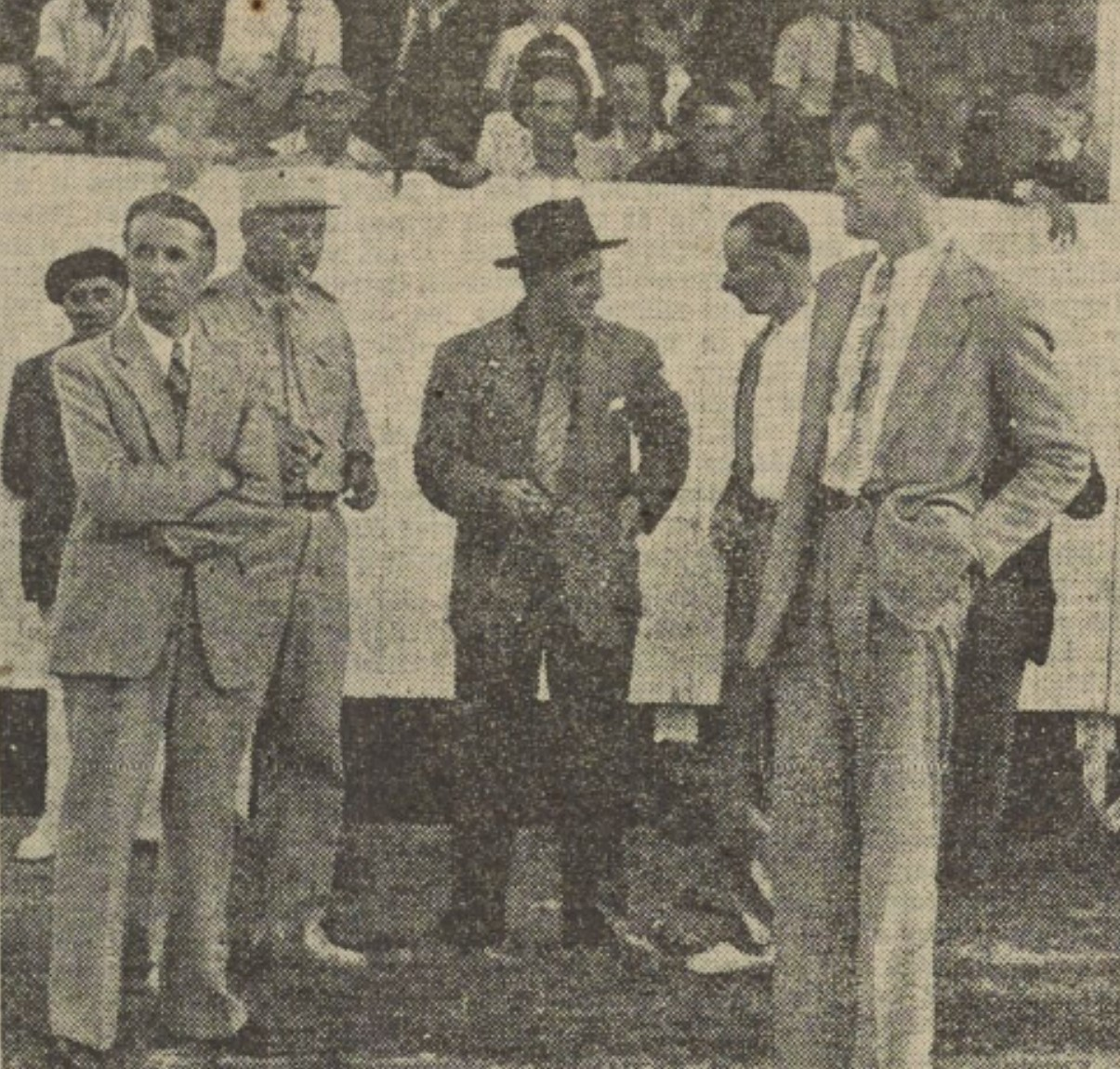
Stade du Hameau, opening ceremony

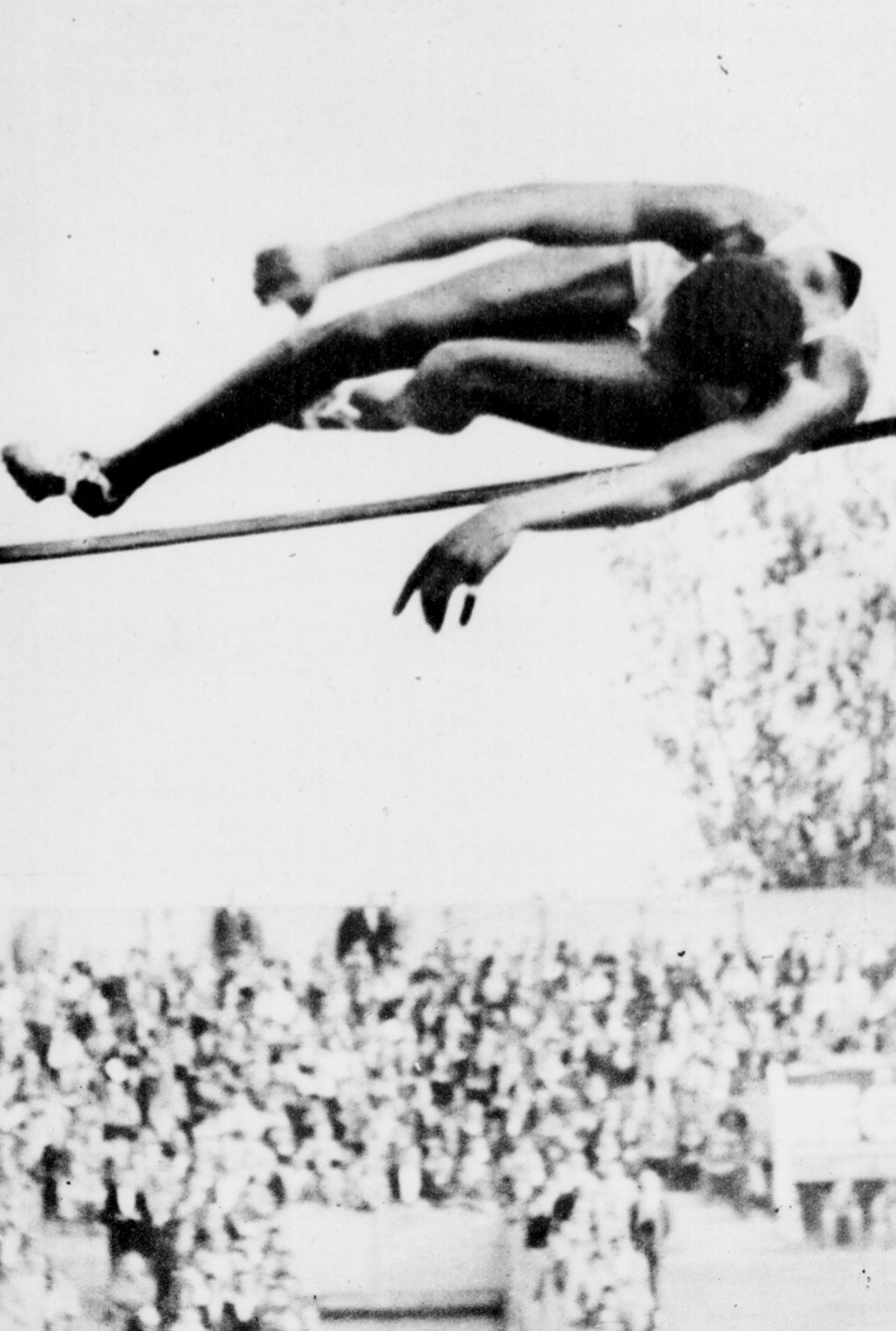
Papa Gallo Thiam in 1949

== Stadium name ==
Stade du Hameau has undergone various name changes throughout its history. Initially inaugurated as the Stade Olympique du Hameau in 1949, it was later renamed the Colonel de Fornel Stadium in honor of its creator in 1957. However, the name most commonly used for the stadium is Stade du Hameau.

In 2009, Bernard Pontneau, President of Section Paloise, and Martine Lignières-Cassou, who was the Mayor of Pau at the time, explored the possibility of renaming the stadium in memory of the late French international player and Section legend, Robert Paparemborde, who had died in 2001. Lignières-Cassou expressed her desire, stating, "I have only one wish, that this stadium will live up to the ambitions of the professional club and that its renovation will be completed under the emblematic name of Paparemborde."
