= Stade Marcel-Deflandre =

Sports stadium in La Rochelle, France

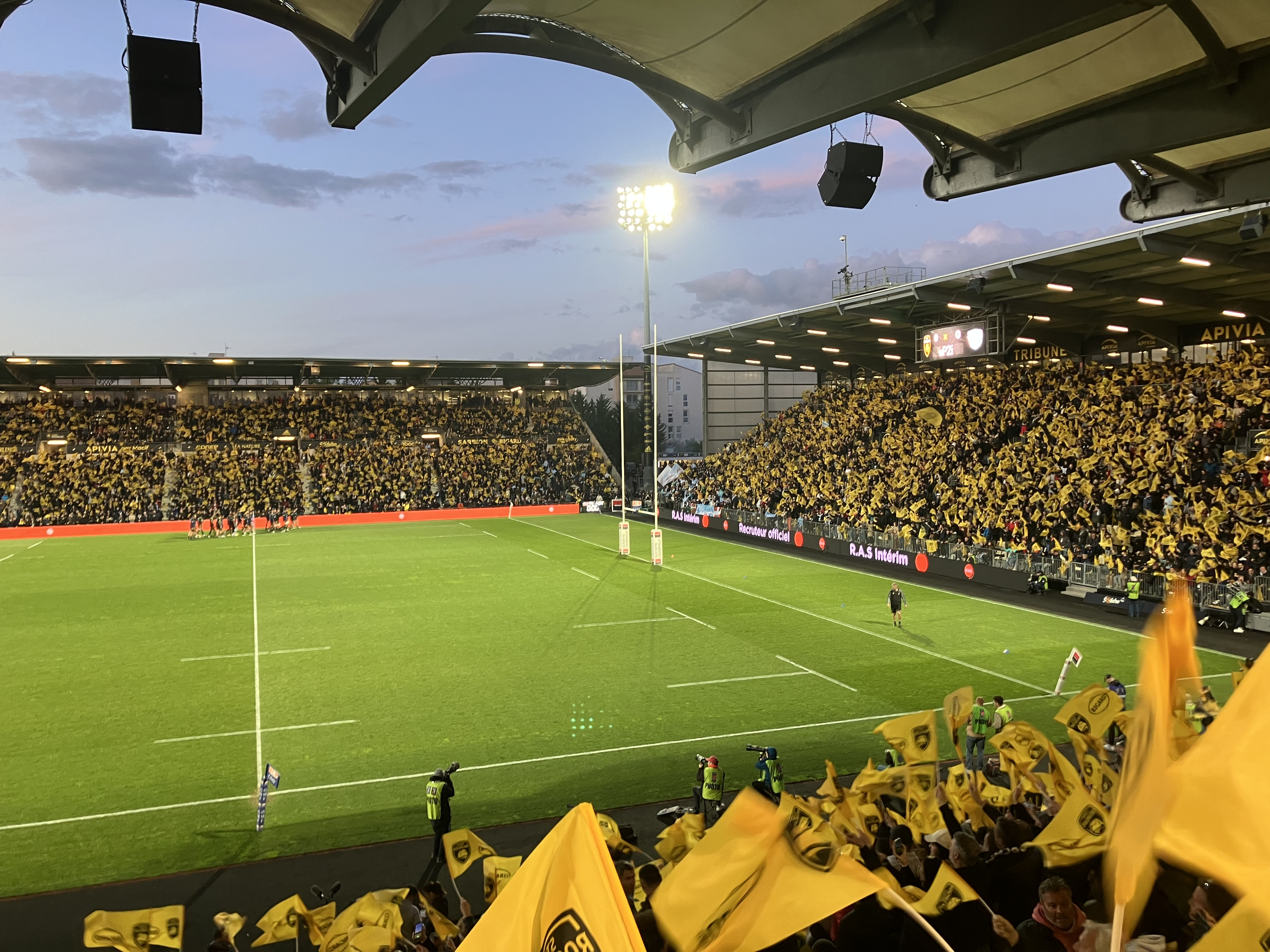
- Interactive map of Stade Marcel-Deflandre
- Location: La Rochelle, France
- Coordinates: 46°09′29″N 1°10′41″W
- Capacity: 18,000
- Surface: grass

Construction
- Opened: September 26, 1926
- Renovated: 2010
- Expanded: May 2, 1995

Tenant
- Stade Rochelais

Stade Marcel-Deflandre is a sports stadium in La Rochelle, France. It was built by Emile Sourice. It is the home ground of rugby union team Stade Rochelais of the Top 14 who have played there since it was opened in 1926. It has undergone significant redevelopment since 1995 and the present capacity is 16,700 (2,500 added during summer 2014). The stadium is named after Marcel Deflandre, a president of the club who was executed in 1944 during the Second World War.

The capacity was expanded to 18,000 in 2025, a phased increase from 16,000 in 2016.

As of their match on 4 January 2026, Stade Rochelais have sold out 112 consecutive Top 14 league games.

== See also ==
- List of football stadiums in France
- Lists of stadiums
