= Tual Trainini =

French rugby union referee

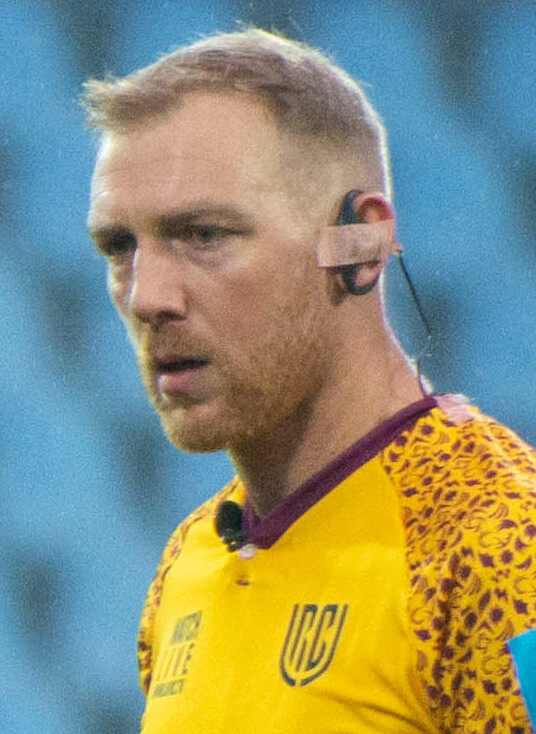
- Born: 11 June 1985 (age 41) France

Rugby union career
Refereeing career
| Years | Competition | Apps |
| 2015– | Top 14 | 74 |
| 2022– | United Rugby Championship | 1 |

Tual Trainini (born 11 June 1985) is a French rugby referee.

== Career ==
Trainini has been officiating professionally since 2011 and has been refereeing in the French Top 14 since the 2015–16 Top 14 season. He has been a regular referee in the European Rugby Champions Cup and EPCR Challenge Cup also. He made his debut refereeing in the 2021–22 United Rugby Championship, refereeing the match between the Scarlets and Cardiff, becoming the 9th Frenchman to referee in the competition.
