= Romain Poite =

Rugby referee

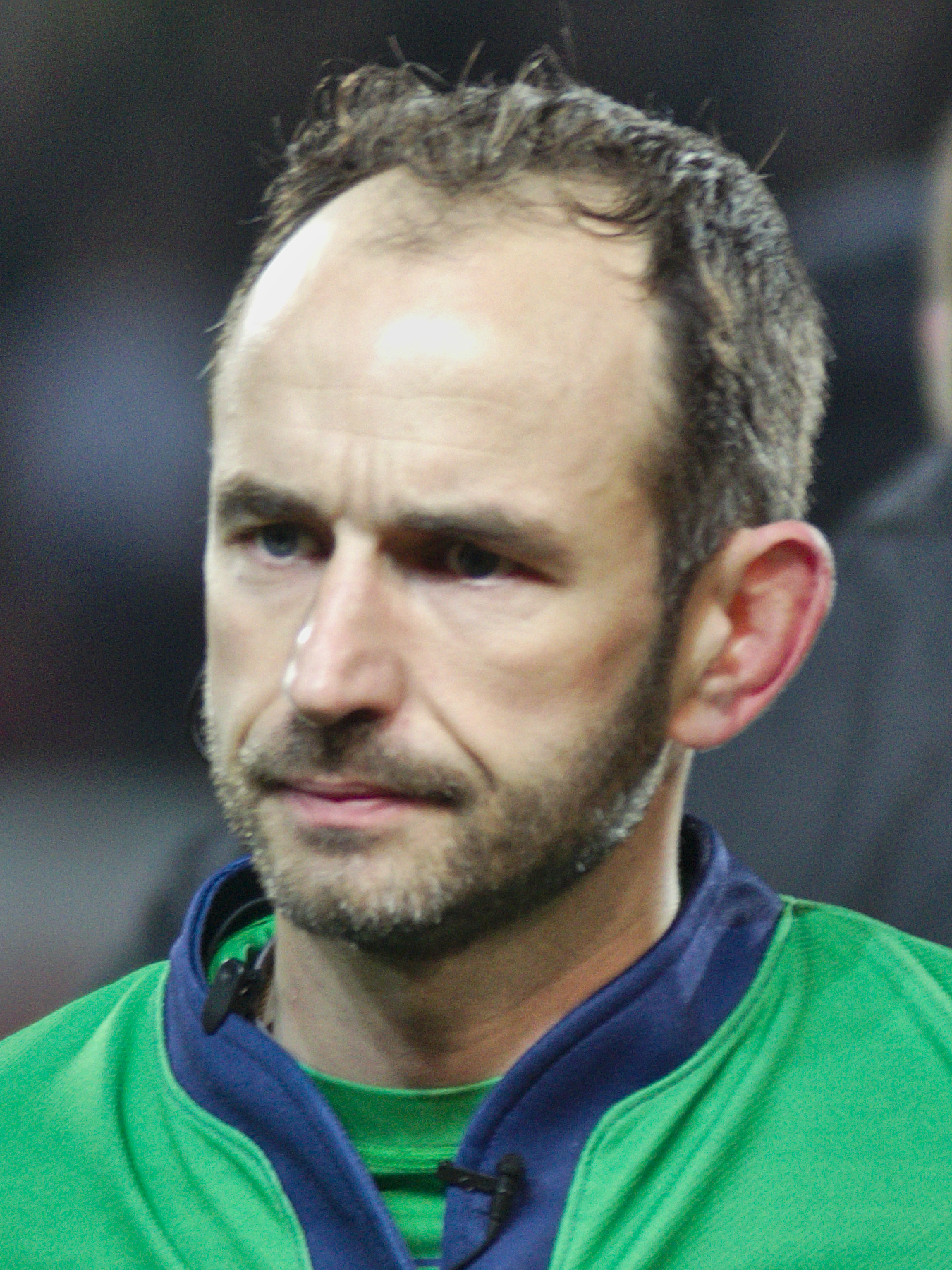
- Poite during a Top 14 match, December 2013.
- Born: 14 September 1975 (age 51) Rochefort, Charente-Maritime, France
- Height: 181 cm (5 ft 11 in)
- Weight: 82 kg (181 lb)
- University: Toulouse Business School
- Occupations: Police detective; rugby referee

Rugby union career
Refereeing career
| Years | Competition | Apps |
| 2006–2021 | Rugby World Cup | |
| 2010-2021 | Six Nations Championship | |
| 2013 | The Rugby Championship | |

Romain Poite (born 14 September 1975) is a French former rugby union international referee. Poite retired in November 2021 after refereeing 72 tests, refereeing the third-most international tests in international rugby behind Nigel Owens (Wales) and Wayne Barnes (England). He made his debut in 2006, and has been a referee at three World Cups (2011, 2015, 2019), including the 2019 Final.

He made his World Cup debut as an assistant referee in 2007 during the match between Ireland and Namibia. He also officiated (as touch judge or television match official) during three games in the 2009 Six Nations Championship. He refereed his first Six Nations match in 2010. Poite was appointed to the 10-man elite referees panel for the 2011 Rugby World Cup, where he refereed four matches. He was also appointed to referee the third and deciding Test of the 2013 British & Irish Lions tour against Australia. He was later excluded for a few months from the IRB panel for giving an incorrect yellow card during the 2013 Rugby Championship. Poite famously told the England rugby team "I'm a referee, not a coach", during the 2017 Six Nations Championship match versus Italy. Poite was appointed referee for the third and deciding British & Irish Lions tour of New Zealand.

== Personal life ==
Poite was born in Rochefort, Charente-Maritime, France on 14 September 1975. Pointe studied at the Toulouse Business School and became a member of the National Police of France, and later a road safety instructor prior to being a rugby referee.
