= 2017–18 European Rugby Champions–Challenge Cup play-offs =

- Event: European Rugby Champions Cup Qualification Play-off
- Date: 19–28 May 2017

The 2017–18 European Rugby Champions Cup-Challenge Cup play-off was the third play-off for entry into the top-level competition of European Club rugby union, the European Rugby Champions Cup.

== Format ==
Following a break to ease fixture congestion caused by the 2015 Rugby World Cup, the three-team play-off held in 2015–16 was expanded, and a four-team format was announced.

The play-off comprised 3 matches, contested by one team from the Premiership, one from the Top 14, and two from the Pro14.

The two Pro12 teams each played one of the Premiership or Top 14 sides in a single-leg semi-final, held at the home ground of the non-Pro12 side. The winners of these matches then contested a play-off final, with the winner of this match competing in the 2017–18 European Rugby Champions Cup. The three losing teams all competed in the 2017–18 European Rugby Challenge Cup.

== Teams ==
Four teams competed in the play-off, having qualified as either the highest team from each league that did not already qualify for the Champions Cup, or as the winner of the 2016–17 European Rugby Challenge Cup.

The following teams had qualified for the play-off:

League	Team	Coach	Stadium
Aviva Premiership	Northampton Saints	(England) Jim Mallinder	Franklin's Gardens
Guinness Pro12	Cardiff Blues	(Wales) Danny Wilson	Cardiff Arms Park
Guinness Pro12	Connacht	(Samoa) Pat Lam	Galway Sportsgrounds
Top 14	Stade Français	(Argentina) Gonzalo Quesada	Stade Jean-Bouin

== Matches ==
A draw was held on 15 March 2017 to determine the two semi-final matches.

=== Semi-finals ===
19 May 2017
18:00 CEST

Stade Français (France)	46–21	(Wales) Cardiff Blues
Try: Nayacalevu 32' c Melikidze 43' c De Giovanni 51' c Macalou (2) 60' m, 68' c Panis 71' m Daguin 76' m Con: Steyn (4/6) 33', 44', 52', 69'; Plisson (0/1); Pen: Steyn (1/1) 10'	Report	Try: Cook (2) 21' c, 63' c N. Williams 24' c Con: Anscombe (3/3) 22', 25', 64'

Stade Jean-Bouin, Paris
Attendance: 4,767
Referee: Greg Garner (RFU)

FB	15	(France) Jérémy Sinzelle
RW	14	(Fiji) Waisea Nayacalevu	(substituted off) 61'
OC	13	(France) Jonathan Danty
IC	12	(South Africa) Meyer Bosman
LW	11	(France) Sekou Macalou
FH	10	(South Africa) Morné Steyn
SH	9	(France) Julien Dupuy	(substituted off) 63'
N8	8	(Italy) Sergio Parisse (c)
OF	7	(France) Matthieu Ugena	(substituted off) 34'
BF	6	(France) Antoine Burban
RL	5	(France) Paul Gabrillagues	(substituted off) 72'
LL	4	(South Africa) Willem Alberts	(substituted off) 66'
TP	3	(Australia) Paul Alo-Emile	(substituted off) 25'
HK	2	(France) Rémi Bonfils	(substituted off) 67'
LP	1	(South Africa) Heinke van der Merwe	(substituted off) 50'
Replacements:
HK	16	(France) Laurent Panis	(substituted in) 67'
PR	17	(France) Rabah Slimani	(substituted in) 50'
PR	18	(Georgia (country)) Giorgi Melikidze	(substituted in) 25'
LK	19	(France) Mathieu De Giovanni	(substituted in) 34'
FL	20	(France) Raphaël Lakafia	(substituted in) 66'
SH	21	(France) Clément Daguin	(substituted in) 63'
FH	22	(France) Jules Plisson	(substituted in) 61'
FL	23	(South Africa) Jono Ross	(substituted in) 72'
Coach:
(Argentina) Gonzalo Quesada

FB	15	(Wales) Matthew Morgan
RW	14	(Wales) Alex Cuthbert
OC	13	(Samoa) Rey Lee-Lo	(substituted off) 7'
IC	12	(New Zealand) Willis Halaholo	(substituted off) 66'
LW	11	(Wales) Rhun Williams	(substituted off) 4'
FH	10	(Wales) Gareth Anscombe
SH	9	(Wales) Lloyd Williams
N8	8	(New Zealand) Nick Williams
OF	7	(Wales) Ellis Jenkins (c)
BF	6	(Wales) Josh Navidi
RL	5	(Wales) Macauley Cook
LL	4	(New Zealand) Jarrad Hoeata
TP	3	(Tonga) Taufaʻao Filise	(substituted off) 61'
HK	2	(Wales) Matthew Rees	(substituted off) 61'
LP	1	(Wales) Rhys Gill	(substituted off) 57'
Replacements:
HK	16	(Wales) Kirby Myhill	(substituted in) 61'	(substituted off) 72'
PR	17	(Wales) Corey Domachowski	(substituted in) 57'
PR	18	(Georgia (country)) Anton Peikrishvili	(substituted in) 61'
LK	19	(Wales) Seb Davies		(substituted in) 72'
FL	20	(Wales) Sion Bennett	(substituted in) 66'
SH	21	(Wales) Tomos Williams		(substituted in) 52'
FH	22	(Wales) Steven Shingler	(substituted in) 7'	(substituted off) 52'
CE	23	(Wales) Garyn Smith	(substituted in) 4'
Coach:
(Wales) Danny Wilson

- Cardiff Blues were demoted to the 2017–18 European Rugby Challenge Cup

20 May 2017
16:00 BST

Northampton Saints (England)	21–15	(Ireland) Connacht
Try: Mallinder 1' c Groom 56' m Con: Mallinder (1/2) 2'; Pen: Mallinder (3/3) 15', 23', 70'	Report	Try: Adeolokun 4' c Heffernan 61' m Con: Ronaldson (1/2) 4'; Pen: Ronaldson (1/1) 28'

Franklin's Gardens, Northampton
Referee: Mathieu Raynal (FFR)

FB	15	(Samoa) Ahsee Tuala		(substituted off) 78'
RW	14	(England) Ben Foden
OC	13	(Tonga) Nafi Tuitavake
IC	12	(England) Luther Burrell		(substituted off) 23'
LW	11	(Wales) George North
FH	10	(England) Harry Mallinder
SH	9	(South Africa) Nic Groom		(substituted off) 67'
N8	8	(France) Louis Picamoles
OF	7	(England) Teimana Harrison		(substituted off) 58'
BF	6	(England) Jamie Gibson	(yellow card) 78' to 80'
RL	5	(England) Christian Day		(substituted off) 64'
LL	4	(England) Courtney Lawes
TP	3	(England) Kieran Brookes		(substituted off) 62'
HK	2	(England) Dylan Hartley (c)		(substituted off) 59'
LP	1	(England) Alex Waller		(substituted off) 62'
Replacements:
HK	16	(England) Mike Haywood		(substituted in) 78'
PR	17	(Fiji) Campese Ma'afu		(substituted in) 62'
PR	18	(England) Gareth Denman		(substituted in) 62'
LK	19	(Fiji) Api Ratuniyarawa		(substituted in) 64'
FL	20	(England) Tom Wood		(substituted in) 58'
SH	21	(England) Lee Dickson		(substituted in) 67'
FH	22	(England) Sam Olver
CE	23	(Scotland) Rory Hutchinson		(substituted in) 23'
Coach:
(England) Jim Mallinder

FB	15	(Ireland) Tiernan O'Halloran
RW	14	(Ireland) Niyi Adeolokun
OC	13	(South Africa) Danie Poolman
IC	12	(Ireland) Craig Ronaldson
LW	11	(Ireland) Cian Kelleher	(substituted off) 3'
FH	10	(Ireland) Jack Carty
SH	9	(Ireland) Kieran Marmion	(substituted off) 66'
N8	8	(Ireland) John Muldoon (c)
OF	7	(New Zealand) Jake Heenan	(substituted off) 56'
BF	6	(Ireland) Seán O'Brien
RL	5	(England) James Cannon	(substituted off) 51'
LL	4	(Ireland) Quinn Roux
TP	3	(Ireland) Finlay Bealham	(substituted off) 68'
HK	2	(Ireland) Dave Heffernan
LP	1	(Ireland) Denis Buckley
Replacements:
HK	16	(Ireland) Shane Delahunt
PR	17	(Ireland) JP Cooney
PR	18	(Ireland) Conor Carey	(substituted in) 68'
LK	19	(Ireland) Ultan Dillane	(substituted in) 51'
FL	20	(Fiji) Naulia Dawai	(substituted in) 56'
SH	21	(Ireland) Caolin Blade
SH	22	(Ireland) John Cooney	(substituted in) 66'
WG	23	(Ireland) Matt Healy	(substituted in) 3'
Coach:
(Samoa) Pat Lam

- Connacht drop to the 2017–18 European Rugby Challenge Cup

=== Play-off final ===
The draw for the semi-finals was also used to decide that the winner of the second semi-final would have home advantage in the play-off final.

26 May 2017
19:45 BST

Northampton Saints (England)	23–22	(France) Stade Français
Try: Foden 45' c Tuala 71' c Con: Mallinder (2/2) 45', 73'; Pen: Mallinder (3/5) 19', 29', 38'	Report	Try: Nayacalevu 3' c Sinzelle 22' m Camara 34' c Con: Plisson (2/3) 4', 35'; Pen: Plisson (1/1) 10'

Franklin's Gardens, Northampton
Attendance: 10,273
Referee: John Lacey (IRFU)

FB	15	(Samoa) Ahsee Tuala		(substituted off) 75'
RW	14	(England) Ben Foden
OC	13	(Tonga) Nafi Tuitavake		(substituted off) 53'
IC	12	(England) Luther Burrell
LW	11	(Wales) George North
FH	10	(England) Harry Mallinder
SH	9	(South Africa) Nic Groom		(substituted off) 66'
N8	8	(France) Louis Picamoles		(substituted off) 53'
OF	7	(England) Tom Wood (c)	(red card) 63'
BF	6	(England) Teimana Harrison
RL	5	(England) Christian Day		(substituted off) 60'
LL	4	(England) Courtney Lawes
TP	3	(England) Kieran Brookes		(substituted off) 60'
HK	2	(England) Dylan Hartley		(substituted off) 66'
LP	1	(England) Alex Waller		(substituted off) 66'
Replacements:
HK	16	(England) Mike Haywood		(substituted in) 66'
PR	17	(Fiji) Campese Ma'afu		(substituted in) 66'
PR	18	(England) Gareth Denman		(substituted in) 60'
LK	19	(Fiji) Api Ratuniyarawa		(substituted in) 60'
FL	20	(England) Jamie Gibson		(substituted in) 53'
SH	21	(England) Lee Dickson		(substituted in) 66'
FH	22	(England) Sam Olver		(substituted in) 75'
CE	23	(Scotland) Rory Hutchinson	(yellow card) 62' to 72'	(substituted in) 53'
Coach:
(England) Jim Mallinder

FB	15	(France) Djibril Camara		(substituted off) 65'
RW	14	(Fiji) Waisea Nayacalevu
OC	13	(France) Geoffrey Doumayrou
IC	12	(France) Jonathan Danty		(substituted off) 22'
LW	11	(France) Jérémy Sinzelle
FH	10	(France) Jules Plisson
SH	9	(Australia) Will Genia		(substituted off) 76'
N8	8	(South Africa) Jono Ross
OF	7	(France) Raphaël Lakafia
BF	6	(France) Antoine Burban		(substituted off) 44'
RL	5	(France) Paul Gabrillagues (c)		(substituted off) 60'
LL	4	(South Africa) Willem Alberts
TP	3	(Australia) Paul Alo-Emile
HK	2	(France) Rémi Bonfils	(yellow card) 42' to 52'	(substituted off) 74'
LP	1	(Georgia (country)) Zurab Zhvania		(substituted off) 51'
Replacements:
HK	16	(South Africa) Craig Burden		(substituted in) 44'	(substituted off) 53'
PR	17	(France) Rabah Slimani		(substituted in) 51'
PR	18	(Georgia (country)) Giorgi Melikidze		(substituted in) 74'
LK	19	(France) Mathieu De Giovanni		(substituted in) 60'
N8	20	(Italy) Sergio Parisse			(substituted in) 53'
SH	21	(France) Clément Daguin		(substituted in) 76'
FH	22	(South Africa) Morné Steyn		(substituted in) 65'
CE	23	(South Africa) Meyer Bosman		(substituted in) 22'
Coach:
(Argentina) Gonzalo Quesada

- Northampton Saints qualified for the 2017–18 European Rugby Champions Cup. Stade Français played in the 2017–18 European Rugby Challenge Cup.

== See also ==
- 2017–18 European Rugby Champions Cup
- 2017–18 European Rugby Challenge Cup
