= History of Sale Sharks =

Aspect of history

The history of Sale Sharks dates back to the club's founding in 1861 and is one of the oldest clubs in English rugby. Throughout their history, the Sale Sharks have been one of the leading rugby union clubs in the North of England.

== Early history ==
Sale moved into Heywood Road in 1905 and would remain there until 2003.

Sale were unbeaten in 26 matches, winning 24 and drawing two in 1911.

Although Pat Davies is counted as Sale's first international, having been picked to play for England in 1927, it was G.A.M. Isherwood who was Sale's first representative in an international Test match, when he played in all three tests of the 1910 British tour to South Africa at scrum-half. The club has consistently provided international players and, during the 1930s, had one of its most dominant periods, fielding players of the calibre of Hal Sever (England), Claude Davey and Wilf Wooller (Wales) and Ken Fyfe (Scotland). It came as little surprise when they took out the 1936 Middlesex Sevens.

Sale ruled the roost in county cup rugby for 15 straight seasons as they went unbeaten from 1972 to 1987 in every one of those cup fixtures. During this period, Sale competed for the chance to be English club champions. In their first year, one after the inaugural competition kicked off in 1971, they made the semi-finals only to lose to eventual winners Coventry 35–6.

During the nineties, despite thrilling displays under Paul Turner, and his successor John Mitchell, both club and ground struggled to keep a grip on the demanding commercial and financial realities of running a professional rugby club.

Sale took 20,000 fans to Twickenham for the 1997 Pilkington Cup Final but Leicester won a mistake-ridden match 9–3. This interest quickly faded and the anticipated increased crowds never materialised and relegation from the Premier Division loomed until rugby union-playing local businessman Brian Kennedy came to the rescue late in the 1999–2000 season. Since then, the club has been on a sound financial footing.

Off the field, Peter Deakin was recruited from Warrington Wolves rugby league as chief executive to employ the skills he had used with the Bradford Bulls and Saracens and he made an immediate impact in raising the club's profile until hit by the serious illness which claimed his life in February 2003.

Success was not immediate; Sale Sharks finished eleventh and tenth in the 12-strong Premiership table in the first two years of the new Millennium. It took the coaching partnership of two former Sale players, Jim Mallinder and Steve Diamond, to produce a team that were 2002 runners-up and qualified for the Heineken Cup.

Player signings matched the elevated profile of the club. Scotland skipper Bryan Redpath was joined by Stuart Pinkerton, Barry Stewart, Graeme Bond, Jason White and Andrew Sheridan. The club then turned to the wealth of talent, hitherto largely untapped, in Rugby League. Apollo Perelini, known as "The Terminator" for his uncompromising style, joined Sale Sharks the day after helping St. Helens to victory in the Super League Grand Final at Old Trafford and the media had a field day when Jason Robinson, possibly the most exciting wing in the world in either code, moved to Sale from Wigan Warriors.

In 2002 the team also went on to capture the Parker Pen Shield at Oxford's Kassam Stadium, defeating Pontypridd 25–22.

The latter Mallinder days saw the club at Twickenham again in 2004, losing narrowly to the Falcons in the Powergen Cup Final. In the summer of 2004 Jim Mallinder left Sale to take up a position in the RFU's National Academy. Following Mallinder's departure Sale appointed former French international Philippe Saint-André who had recently been turned down for the vacant position as coach of Wales. However, with a new influx of players including French internationals Sébastien Bruno and Sébastien Chabal helped Saint-André and Sale win the 2005 European Challenge Cup again at Oxford, this time 27–3 against Pau, for the second time in three years.

== 2005–06 season champions ==
New additions to the squad for the 2005–06 season included French prop Lionel Faure, Samoan back Elvis Seveali'i and Welsh number eight Nathan Bonner-Evans. Building on their European Challenge Cup success, Sale won 16 games out of 22 to finish two games clear at the top of the table. In the semi-final, they won 22–12. They won the 2006 Premiership title with a 45–20 win against Leicester Tigers.

== 2006–07 season ==
After the success of the 2005–06 season many at the club had hoped for a repeat and with a strong squad boosted by several quality players including England Saxons centre Chris Bell, Former Wales prop Ben Evans and Argentina flanker Juan Martín Fernández Lobbe it seemed likely. However over the autumn months an injury crisis began with the loss of Scotland captain Jason White to a knee injury whilst playing against Romania. More bad news followed with England fly half Charlie Hodgson and England prop Andrew Sheridan falling to knee and ankle injuries respectively. More and more injuries were picked up over the following months until Sale were left with only 17 of a 38-man squad fit to play in their final Heineken Cup match against Ospreys. (Source: Sale sharks website)

== 2007–08 season ==
In 2007–08, it was World Cup year so the club was without some of out big names e.g. Jason White, Andrew Sheridan, Sébastien Chabal etc. They still had Charlie Hodgson who wasn't picked for England . Sale appointed James Jennings as the new chief executive and Dean Schofield as the new captain. Sale had signed some good players including Rory Lamont, Brent Cockbain, Rudi Keil, Julien Laharrague and Scott Lawson but the biggest signing had to be Luke McAlister from the Blues in New Zealand. Signing him was said to be one of the biggest signings Sale had ever made. The season was up and down in parts though. The up parts were; seeing Ben Foden progress at full back to become a superb player, beating Leicester Tigers home and away was a first plus seeing Richard Wigglesworth play for England for the first time was a plus. The academy players also became an integral part to the squad (Neil Briggs, Sean Cox, Will Cliff). However, the low points were not qualifying for the semi-finals in the Premiership or win a trophy as they were targets at the beginning of the season. Overall it was a mixed season. (Source: Sale sharks website)

At the end of the season, several players left the club: Ben Foden, Chris Mayor and Ignacio Fernández Lobbe all signed for Northampton Saints, where they were joined by Christian Day. Sililo Martens joined Llanelli Scarlets while Magnus Lund, Julien Laharrague and Ben Evans joined teams in France.

== 2008–09 season ==
During the closed season the retirement through injury of Steve Hanley was announced. On 19 August 2008, Juan Martín Fernández Lobbe was announced as the captain for the new season, replacing Jason White who was still recovering from a serious knee injury last season. Sébastien Chabal and Dean Schofield were announced as vice-captains.

A new Premiership record of four games without leaking a try was set at the start of the season, these games were Newcastle (A), Saracens (H), Bristol (A) and Gloucester (H).

In December 2008 the club's board announced that Philippe Saint-André would step down from his position as Director of Rugby at the end of the season. Head coach Kingsley Jones was promoted to Director of Rugby, assuming overall responsibility for all rugby operations. Former Sale winger Jason Robinson replaced Jones as Head Coach from the start of the 2009–10 season.

Sale was knocked out of the European Cup in the group stages. Despite earning a bonus-point win over Clermont in France in the first round, a defeat at home to Munster, a defeat to Montauban and Munster beating The Sharks in Ireland led to a disappointing exit.

Charlie Hodgson was voted the player of the year at the club's end-of-season awards on Thursday 30 April 2009.

== 2009–10 season ==
Along with the departure of Saint-André, a number of key players announced that their time at Sale was up. Captain Juan Martín Fernández Lobbe, Lionel Faure, Jason White, Sébastien Bruno, Rory Lamont, Luke McAlister and cult figure Sébastien Chabal all bade farewell to the club at the end of the season. It was announced in February 2009 that the new coaching team for the 2009–10 season would be led by the new director of rugby Kingsley Jones, the new head coach Jason Robinson assisted by Phil Keith-Roach (forwards coach) and Byron Hayward (kicking coach). Dean Schofield retained the captaincy.

It was announced on 18 March 2009 that Sale Sharks had signed Ben Cohen. The former England Winger signed from French outfit Brive.

In February 2010, the club announced that it had signed former Welsh international Dafydd James until the end of the season to provide cover for injured players in the back division.

Sale had a disappointing season, finishing 11th in the Premiership and only securing safety from relegation on the penultimate weekend of the season.

Sale's Heineken Cup campaign also ended in disappointment, although they did challenge the group favourites Toulouse and the Cardiff Blues. The highlights of the campaign were a stunning 27–26, win at home to Cardiff and wins home and away against Harlequins.

Towards the end of the season, there were changes made in the coaching staff. Keith-Roach stepped down from his duties after deciding he could not commit to a full-time role. Robinson, who originally had no intentions to coach but responded to the club's request for help, left the club to pursue other interests. Former All Black forward Mike Brewer replaced Robinson as head coach, while Kingsley Jones remained as Director of Rugby, with the added responsibilities of long-term squad planning and running the academy.

== 2010–11 season ==
In December 2010, after only eight months in the role, Brewer was sacked as head coach. Academy coach Pete Anglesea took over as first team coach on a temporary basis until the end of the season, leading Sale to a 10th-placed finish.

== 2011–12 season ==
In the 2011–12 pre-season, former player Steve Diamond was announced as chairman. Immediately, an overhaul of the playing and coaching staff began, dubbed "Diamond's Revolution", including buying international players such as Andy Powell and Tony Buckley. With these new players and a fresh coaching lineup including former London Wasps coach Tony Hanks, Sale started the season well, with early victories over London Irish and Northampton, but form faltered towards the latter half of the campaign, and Tony Hanks was fired as head coach after a defeat to Saracens.

Tragedy struck in January 2012 when it was discovered that 24-year-old former winger and England Under 19s and Under 20s representative Selorm Kuadey had apparently committed suicide. He had played with Sale for five seasons before retiring in 2010 due to injury.

In April 2012, Sale announced that they would be moving stadium from Edgeley Park, their home since 2003, to the newly constructed Salford City Stadium (now renamed AJ Bell Stadium), to share with the Salford City Reds. At the close of the season, Sale beat Gloucester and Bath to sixth place in the Premiership, meaning that they qualified for Heineken Cup rugby in the 2012–13 season. More signings were announced, most prominently the return of popular prop Eifion Lewis-Roberts, the signing of Scottish international Richie Gray and a return to English rugby for Danny Cipriani.

== 2012–13 season ==
A disappointing season for Sale at their new stadium, with them spending most of the season in the relegation place. But later performances led to them finishing 10th overall. They played well in the Premiership 7's beating Leicester Tigers, and Northampton Saints leading to them qualifying for the final grouping. When they played in the final grouping, losses to Saracens and Gloucester saw them knocked out, with no chance of silverware. There was one Momentous moment as Mark Cueto over took former Sale teammate Steve Hanley, as top try scorer in the premiership, Steve's record stood at 75 tries, and Mark scored his 76th try, against Exeter Chiefs

Their first win of the season was against Cardiff Blues in the Heineken Cup, which was their only win in that years Heineken Cup, where they finished bottom of their pool. But also in that years Heineken Cup, they also lost to Toulon 62–0 with a nine try demolition of the Manchester team.

The only real success of their season was their performance in the LV Cup where wins against Saracens, Scarlets and London Wasps lead to Sale qualifying for the knock-out stages, where they again beat Saracens in the semi-final, to face Harlequins in the final. Sale failed to beat Harlequins but came close, with a try from Johnny Leota and three penalties from Danny Cipriani taking the Sale score to 14, but in-form Harlequins scoring 31 points.

== 2013–14 season ==
This season showed a huge improvement from the season before. Sale finished the season in sixth place, missing out on a place on the play-off competition, but managed to secure qualification to the inaugural European Rugby Champions Cup. They also managed to reach the quarter-finals of the European Challenge Cup, where they lost to Northampton Saints.

Sale's successes in the season prompted England national team head coach Stuart Lancaster to call up six Sale players in to the squad to play in the summer tour.

== 2014–15 season ==
For the 2014–15 season, the Sharks finished in seventh in the Aviva Premiership, while they finished bottom of their pool in the European Rugby Champions Cup, having pushed Munster, Saracens & Clermont Auvergne all the way at the AJ Bell Stadium. The standout players for this campaign were academy prospects Mike Haley & Josh Beaumont who became first team regulars, and Josh was called up for the England squad for the England XV which played the Barbarians in May, and scored a try.

== 2015–16 season ==
The departure of several Sharks at the end of the previous season, included the retirement of club legend the all-time record Premiership try scorer Mark Cueto. Due to the World Cup the Aviva Premiership was delayed until mid-October. The Premiership season started badly for Sale with an embarrassing 41–3 defeat at reigning champions Saracens. A 20–13 home win over Northampton saw 21 year-old Sharks centre Sam James scoring a stunning first Premiership try.

Sale were drawn in Pool 2 of the European Rugby Challenge Cup with Newport and French sides Pau and Castres, they lost 30–12 at Newport before a win 29–20 a week later at home to Pau. In December wins away (17–10) and home (31–10) against Castres kept Sale in contention for a Challenge Cup quarter final place. Sale won away 27–3 against Pau and setting up a winner-takes-all clash with Newport to top the pool. Sale scored four tries in a comfortable 38–5 victory to qualify for a home quarter final against Montpellier.

In June 2016, Sale Sharks confirmed a takeover by an investment group, CorpAcq Ltd, led by Simon Orange. This ended Brian Kennedy's 16-year tenure in charge.
