= 2011–12 LV Cup =

Tournament details
- Countries: England; Wales
- Tournament format(s): Round-robin and knockout
- Date: 15 October 2011 – 18 March 2012

Tournament statistics
- Teams: 16
- Matches played: 35
- Attendance: 273,097 (7,803 per match)
- Tries scored: 179 (5.11 per match)

Final
- Venue: Sixways Stadium
- Attendance: 11,895
- Champions: Leicester Tigers (7th title)
- Runners-up: Northampton Saints

The 2011–12 LV Cup (styled as the LV= Cup) was the 41st season of England's national rugby union cup competition, and the seventh to follow the Anglo-Welsh format.

The competition consisted of the four Welsh Pro12 teams and the 12 English Premiership clubs arranged into pools consisting of three English and one Welsh team. Teams were guaranteed two home and two away pool matches, with teams in Pools 1 and 4 playing each other and teams in Pools 2 and 3 playing each other, with the top team from each pool qualifying for the semi-finals. The competition took place during the autumn soon after the World Cup and on international fixture dates during the Six Nations, thus allowing teams to develop their squad players.

The defending champions were Gloucester, who this season failed to progress from the pool stage.

== Pool stages ==
=== Points system ===
The points scoring system for the pool stages will be as follows:

- 4 points for a win
- 2 points for a draw
- 1 bonus point for scoring four or more tries in a match (TB)
- 1 bonus point for a loss by seven points or less (LB)

=== Pool 1 v Pool 4 ===
Tables

Pool 1
Team	P	W	D	L	PF	PA	PD	TF	TB	LB	Pts
(England) Bath	4	4	0	0	169	46	123	24	4	0	20
(England) Saracens	4	2	1	1	90	70	20	9	2	0	12
(Wales) Ospreys	4	1	0	3	71	112	−41	7	1	0	5
(England) London Wasps	4	0	0	4	74	137	−63	8	1	2	3

Pool 4
Team	P	W	D	L	PF	PA	PD	TF	TB	LB	Pts
(England) Northampton Saints	4	3	0	1	139	84	55	18	3	0	15
(England) Exeter Chiefs	4	2	0	2	88	99	−11	9	1	0	9
(England) Worcester Warriors	4	2	0	2	71	120	−49	8	0	0	8
(Wales) Newport Gwent Dragons	4	1	1	2	67	101	−34	5	0	1	7

==== Round 1 ====
15 October 2011
14:30

Newport Gwent Dragons (Wales)	16–46	(England) Bath
	Report

Rodney Parade
Attendance: 4,646

15 October 2011
15:00

Northampton Saints (England)	36–6	(England) Saracens
	Report

Franklin's Gardens
Attendance: 11,513

15 October 2011
15:00

Worcester Warriors (England)	20–19	(England) London Wasps
	Report

Sixways Stadium
Attendance: 6,250
Referee: Tim Wigglesworth (RFU)

15 October 2011
19:45

Exeter Chiefs (England)	35–9	(Wales) Ospreys
	Report

Sandy Park
Attendance: 6,368

==== Round 2 ====
22 October 2011
14:15

Bath (England)	46–13	(England) Worcester Warriors
	Report

Recreation Ground
Attendance: 11,576

22 October 2011
18:00

Ospreys (Wales)	22–32	(England) Northampton Saints
	Report

Brewery Field
Attendance: 4,463

22 October 2011
19:45

London Wasps (England)	29–30	(Wales) Newport Gwent Dragons
	Report

Adams Park
Attendance: 4,492

23 October 2011
15:00

Saracens (England)	43–20	(England) Exeter Chiefs
	Report

Vicarage Road
Attendance: 4,507
Referee: Andrew Small (RFU)

==== Round 3 ====
27 January 2012
19:00

Ospreys (Wales)	26–21	(Wales) Newport Gwent Dragons
	Report

Brewery Field
Attendance: 4,896
Referee: Greg Garner (RFU)

28 January 2012
14:30

Bath (England)	46–14	(England) Northampton Saints
	Report

Recreation Ground
Attendance: 11,994
Referee: Sean Davey (RFU)

28 January 2012
15:00

London Wasps (England)	16–30	(England) Exeter Chiefs
	Report

Adams Park
Attendance: 4,877
Referee: Tim Wigglesworth (RFU)

29 January 2012
15:00

Saracens (England)	41–14	(England) Worcester Warriors
	Report

Vicarage Road
Attendance: 4,970

==== Round 4 ====
3 February 2012
19:30

Newport Gwent Dragons (Wales)	P–P	(England) Saracens

Rodney Parade

This match was postponed due to a frozen pitch at Rodney Parade. The LV= Organising Committee subsequently awarded the match to Saracens by 20 points to nil (a bonus point win). Dragons were also fined £10,000 (suspended) for their failure under LV= Cup Regulation 6.7 (that the pitch was unplayable and no suitable alternative arrangements were in place). Dragons appealed this decision and their appeal was upheld. The decision was quashed, with the match instead being recorded as a 0–0 draw and the suspended fine reduced from £10,000 to £5,000.

4 February 2012
15:00

Northampton Saints (England)	57–10	(England) London Wasps
	Report

Franklin's Gardens
Attendance: 12,128
Referee: Dean Richards (RFU)

4 February 2012
15:00

Worcester Warriors (England)	24–14	(Wales) Ospreys
	Report

Sixways Stadium
Attendance: 5,856

5 February 2012
17:00

Exeter Chiefs (England)	3–31	(England) Bath
	Report

Sandy Park
Attendance: 5,557

=== Pool 2 v Pool 3 ===
Tables

Pool 2
Team	P	W	D	L	PF	PA	PD	TF	TB	LB	Pts
(England) Leicester Tigers	4	3	0	1	86	67	19	9	1	0	13
(England) London Irish	4	2	0	2	100	91	9	7	1	1	10
(Wales) Cardiff Blues	4	1	0	3	54	143	−89	6	1	0	5
(England) Sale Sharks	4	1	0	3	78	146	−68	8	0	0	4

Pool 3
Team	P	W	D	L	PF	PA	PD	TF	TB	LB	Pts
(Wales) Scarlets	4	3	0	1	102	44	58	13	2	1	15
(England) Harlequins	4	2	0	2	112	108	4	12	2	1	11
(England) Gloucester	4	2	0	2	127	93	34	16	2	0	10
(England) Newcastle Falcons	4	2	0	2	106	73	33	13	2	0	10

==== Round 1 ====
15 October 2011
15:00

Gloucester (England)	58–27	(England) Sale Sharks
	Report

Kingsholm
Attendance: 9,934

15 October 2011
15:00

Harlequins (England)	26–19	(England) London Irish
	Report

The Stoop
Attendance: 10,500
Referee: Llyr ApGeraint-Roberts (RFU)

15 October 2011
18:00

Scarlets (Wales)	31–3	(England) Leicester Tigers
	Report

Parc y Scarlets
Attendance: 6,314
Referee: Sean Davey (RFU)

15 October 2011
18:30

Newcastle Falcons (England)	33–3	(Wales) Cardiff Blues
	Report

Kingston Park
Attendance: 3,176
Referee: Andrew Small (RFU)

==== Round 2 ====
21 October 2011
19:45

Leicester Tigers (England)	40–14	(England) Gloucester
	Report

Welford Road
Attendance: 16,408
Referee: James Jones (WRU)

21 October 2011
19:45

Sale Sharks (England)	25–37	(England) Harlequins
	Report

Edgeley Park
Attendance: 4,629
Referee: Tim Wigglesworth (RFU)

23 October 2011
14:30

Cardiff Blues (Wales)	3–30	(Wales) Scarlets
	Report

Cardiff City Stadium
Attendance: 6,913
Referee: Greg Garner (RFU)

23 October 2011
15:00

London Irish (England)	39–23	(England) Newcastle Falcons
	Report

Madejski Stadium
Attendance: 5,469
Referee: Dean Richards (RFU)

==== Round 3 ====
28 January 2012
15:00

Gloucester (England)	40–3	(Wales) Cardiff Blues
	Report

Kingsholm
Attendance: 13,099
Referee: Llyr ApGeraint-Roberts (RFU)

28 January 2012
15:00

Harlequins (England)	9–19	(England) Leicester Tigers
	Report

The Stoop
Attendance: 13,780

28 January 2012
18:30

Scarlets (Wales)	27–19	(England) London Irish
	Report

Parc y Scarlets
Attendance: 8,117
Referee: Nigel Owens (WRU)

29 January 2012
15:30

Newcastle Falcons (England)	37–7	(England) Sale Sharks
	Report

Kingston Park
Attendance: 4,095

==== Round 4 ====
4 February 2012
15:00

Leicester Tigers (England)	24–13	(England) Newcastle Falcons
	Report

Welford Road
Attendance: 19,767

4 February 2012
15:00

London Irish (England)	23–15	(England) Gloucester
	Report

Madejski Stadium
Attendance: 9,221
Referee: Sean Davey (RFU)

4 February 2012
15:00

Sale Sharks (England)	19–14	(Wales) Scarlets
	Report

Edgeley Park
Attendance: 3,012

5 February 2012
13:00

Cardiff Blues (Wales)	45–40	(England) Harlequins
	Report

Cardiff City Stadium
Attendance: 2,093
Referee: James Jones (WRU)

== Knockout stage ==
Semi-finals
9 March 2012 – Recreation Ground
(England) Bath	16
(England) Leicester Tigers	17
11 March 2012 – Franklin's Gardens
(England) Northampton Saints	27
(Wales) Scarlets	12

Final
18 March 2012 – Sixways Stadium
(England) Leicester Tigers	26
(England) Northampton Saints	14

=== Qualification criteria ===
The top teams from each pool qualify for the knockout stages. The pool winners will be decided by the following criteria:

1. The pool winner will be the club with the highest number of match points in each pool. The pool winners will be ranked 1 to 4 by reference to the number of match points earned in the pools.
2. If two or more clubs in the same pool end the pool stage equal on match points, then the order in which they have finished will be determined by:

i. the greater number of matches won by the club and
ii. if the number of matches won is equal, the club with the greater total number of tries scored and
iii. if the total number of tries scored is equal, the club with the greater points difference (points scored for, less points scored against) and
iv. if the points difference is equal, the club with the fewer number of red cards and
v. if the number of red cards is the same, by the toss a coin.

Each of the four qualifying clubs shall be ranked as above and shall play each other as follows:

Semi-final 1 – 1st ranked club v 4th ranked club
Semi-final 2 – 2nd ranked club v 3rd ranked club

The first club listed in each of the semi-final matches shall be the home club.

Qualifiers
Rank	Team	P	W	D	L	PF	PA	PD	TF	TB	LB	Pts
1	(England) Bath	4	4	0	0	169	46	123	24	4	0	20
2	(England) Northampton Saints	4	3	0	1	139	84	55	18	3	0	15
3	(Wales) Scarlets	4	3	0	1	102	44	58	13	2	1	15
4	(England) Leicester Tigers	4	3	0	1	86	67	19	9	1	0	13

=== Semi-finals ===
9 March 2012
19:30

Bath (England)	16–17	(England) Leicester Tigers
Try: Mears 31' c Con: Heathcote (1/1) 31; Pen: Heathcote 24', 51', 60'	Report	Try: Kitchener 21' m Pen: Ford (4/4) 18', 49', 53', 72'

Recreation Ground, Bath
Attendance: 10,205
Referee: Dave Pearson (RFU)

11 March 2012
13:00

Northampton Saints (England)	27–12	(Wales) Scarlets
Try: Waller 15' c Armstrong 47' m Con: Myler (1/2) 15'; Pen: Myler (4/4) 21', 35', 48', 62'; Lamb (1/1) 76'	Report	Pen: S. Jones (4/4) 23', 36', 42', 53'

Franklin's Gardens, Northampton
Attendance: 10,377
Referee: Dean Richards (RFU)

=== Final ===
18 March 2012
15:00

Leicester Tigers (England)	26–14	(England) Northampton Saints
Try: Mafi 25' c Hamilton 49' c Con: Ford (2/2) 25', 49'; Pen: Ford (4/4) 14', 18', 24', 45'	Report	Try: Day 74' m Pen: Myler (3/3) 5', 11', 21'

Sixways Stadium, Worcester
Attendance: 11,895
Referee: JP Doyle (RFU)

FB	15	(Ireland) Geordan Murphy (c)
RW	14	(Argentina) Horacio Agulla
OC	13	(England) Matt Smith
IC	12	(England) Billy Twelvetrees
LW	11	(New Zealand) Scott Hamilton
FH	10	(England) George Ford
SH	9	(England) James Grindal
N8	8	(England) Thomas Waldrom
OF	7	(New Zealand) Craig Newby
BF	6	(Tonga) Steve Mafi
RL	5	(England) Graham Kitchener
LL	4	(England) George Skivington
TP	3	(Samoa) Logovi'i Mulipola
HK	2	(England) Rob Hawkins
LP	1	(England) Boris Stankovich
Replacements:
HK	16	(England) Tom Youngs
PR	17	(Argentina) Marcos Ayerza
PR	18	(England) Julian White
LK	19	(England) Calum Green
FL	20	(Australia) Julian Salvi
SH	21	(Scotland) Scott Steele
FH	22	(England) Toby Flood
CE	23	(England) Andy Forsyth
Coach:
(England) Richard Cockerill

FB	15	(England) Paul Diggin
RW	14	(Russia) Vasily Artemyev
OC	13	(Samoa) George Pisi
IC	12	(Ireland) James Downey
LW	11	(England) Scott Armstrong
FH	10	(England) Stephen Myler
SH	9	(Wales) Martin Roberts
N8	8	(Ireland) Roger Wilson
OF	7	(England) Tom Wood
BF	6	(England) Calum Clark (c)
RL	5	(England) Christian Day
LL	4	(England) James Craig
TP	3	(England) Paul Doran-Jones
HK	2	(England) Andy Long
LP	1	(Tonga) Soane Tongaʻuiha
Replacements:
HK	16	(England) Ross McMillan
PR	17	(England) Alex Waller
PR	18	(South Africa) Brian Mujati
LK	19	(New Zealand) Mark Sorenson
FL	20	(England) Ben Nutley
SH	21	(England) Ryan Glynn
FH	22	(England) Ryan Lamb
CE	23	(England) Tom May
Coach:
(England) Jim Mallinder

== See also ==
- 2011–12 English Premiership (rugby union)
- 2011–12 Pro 12
