= 2016–17 European Rugby Challenge Cup =

Tournament details
- Countries: England; France; Italy; Romania; Russia; Scotland; Wales
- Tournament format(s): Round-robin and Knockout
- Date: 13 October 2016 – 12 May 2017

Tournament statistics
- Teams: 20
- Matches played: 66
- Attendance: 483,750 (7,330 per match)
- Highest attendance: 24,494; Gloucester v Stade Francais (12 May 2017)
- Lowest attendance: 300; Enisey-ETM v Brive (10 December 2016)
- Tries scored: 433 (6.56 per match)
- Top point scorer(s): Dan Biggar (Ospreys) (78 points)
- Top try scorer(s): Keelan Giles (Ospreys) (7 tries)

Final
- Venue: Murrayfield Stadium, Edinburgh
- Champions: (France) Stade Français
- Runners-up: (England) Gloucester

The 2016–17 European Rugby Challenge Cup was the third edition of the European Rugby Challenge Cup, an annual second-tier rugby union competition for professional clubs. Clubs from six European nations plus one Russian club competed. It was also the 21st season of the Challenge Cup competition in all forms, following on from the now defunct European Challenge Cup.

Montpellier were the reigning champions, having beaten Harlequins in the final of the 2015–16 European Rugby Challenge Cup. They did not defend their title as they automatically qualified for the 2016–17 European Rugby Champions Cup as a result of the win.

The first round of the group stage began on the weekend of 13/14/15/16 October 2016, and the competition ended with the final on 12 May 2017 in Edinburgh.

Stade Français won the final 25–17 against Gloucester.

== Teams ==
20 teams qualified for the 2016–17 European Rugby Challenge Cup; a total of 18 qualified from across the Premiership, Pro12 and Top 14, as a direct result of their domestic league performance, with two coming through a play-off. The expected distribution of teams was:

- England: 6
  - Any teams finishing between 7th-11th position in the Aviva Premiership. (5 Teams)
  - The champion of the Greene King IPA Championship. (1 Team)
- France: 7
  - Any teams finishing between 8th-12th position in the Top 14. (5 Teams)
  - The champion, and the winner of the promotion play-off, from the Pro D2. (2 Teams)
- Ireland, Italy, Scotland & Wales: 5 teams
  - Any teams that did not qualify for the European Rugby Champions Cup, through the Guinness Pro12 — namely the Pro12 bottom 5. (5 teams)

The French Top 14 had its allocation reduced by 1 place after Montpellier won the 2015–16 European Rugby Challenge Cup. This is after it was decided that, due to the 2015 Rugby World Cup, there would be no qualification play-off.

- Other European Nations: 2 teams
  - Two teams qualified through the 2015–16 Qualifying Competition, which took place alongside the Challenge Cup and Champions Cup competitions.

The following clubs qualified for the Challenge Cup.

Aviva Premiership	Top 14	Pro12			Qualifying Competition
England	France	Italy	Scotland	Wales	(Europe) Other
Harlequins; Gloucester; Bath; Worcester Warriors; Newcastle Falcons; Bristol (Championship winner)	Brive; La Rochelle; Grenoble; Pau; Stade Français; Lyon (Pro D2 champion); Bayonne (Pro D2 Play-off winner)	Treviso	Edinburgh	Cardiff Blues; Ospreys; Newport Gwent Dragons	(Russia) Enisey-STM; (Romania) Timișoara Saracens

=== Qualifying competition ===
Once again, EPCR expanded the qualifying competition.

Eight teams were split into two pools of four. Each team played the four teams in the other pool once. The winner of each pool then played a two-legged final against last year's qualifying sides, and the winners, on aggregate, took the two remaining places in the Challenge Cup.

==== Pool A play-off ====
9 April 2016

Rovigo (Italy)	0 – 31	(Russia) Enisey-STM

23 April 2016

Enisey-STM (Russia)	39–5	(Italy) Rovigo

- Enisey-STM qualify with an aggregate score of 70–5

==== Pool B play-off ====
9 April 2016

Timișoara Saracens (Romania)	36–23	(Italy) Calvisano

23 April 2016

Calvisano (Italy)	17–28	(Romania) Timișoara Saracens

- Timișoara Saracens qualify with an aggregate score of 64–40

=== Team details ===
Below is the list of coaches, captain and stadiums with their method of qualification for each team.

Note: Placing shown in brackets, denotes standing at the end of the regular season for their respective leagues, with their end of season positioning shown through CH for Champions, RU for Runner-up, SF for losing Semi-finalist and QF for losing Quarter-finalist.

Team	Coach / Director of Rugby	Captain	Stadium	Capacity	Method of Qualification
(England) Bath	(New Zealand) Todd Blackadder	(England) Dave Attwood	Recreation Ground	14,500	Aviva Premiership 7th-11th (9th)
(France) Bayonne	(France) Vincent Etcheto	(France) Jean Monribot	Stade Jean Dauger	16,934	Pro D2 runner-up
(Italy) Benetton Treviso	(New Zealand) Kieran Crowley	(Italy) Alessandro Zanni	Stadio Comunale di Monigo	6,700	Pro12 bottom 5 (12th)
(England) Bristol	(England) Andy Robinson	(Samoa) Jack Lam	Ashton Gate Stadium	27,000	2015–16 RFU Championship Champion
(France) Brive	(France) Nicolas Godignon	(France) Arnaud Méla	Stade Amédée-Domenech	16,000	Top 14 7th-12th (8th)
(Wales) Cardiff Blues	(England) Danny Wilson	(Wales) Gethin Jenkins	BT Cardiff Arms Park	12,125	Pro12 bottom 5 (7th)
(Scotland) Edinburgh	(South Africa) Alan Solomons	(Scotland) Grant Gilchrist	Murrayfield Stadium; New Myreside (Note: On 10 May 2016, it was announced that Edinburgh will move all their home games to Myreside for the second half of the season, as their new permanent home ground.)	67,144 (Note: Although Murrayfield's full capacity is 67,144, only the lower section of the West Stand, with a capacity of 12,464, is generally opened for Edinburgh fixtures.); 5,500	Pro12 bottom 5 (9th)
(Russia) Enisey-STM	(Russia) Alexander Pervukhin	(Latvia) Uldis Saulite	Slava Stadium; Trud Stadium; Sochi Central Stadium	2,500; 3,000; 10,200	Challenge Cup Qualification play-off
(England) Gloucester	(Ireland) David Humphreys	(Scotland) Greig Laidlaw	Kingsholm Stadium	16,115	Aviva Premiership 7th-11th (8th)
(France) Grenoble	(Ireland) Bernard Jackman	(France) Jonathan Wisniewski	Stade des Alpes	20,068	Top 14 7th-12th (10th)
(England) Harlequins	(England) John Kingston	(England) Danny Care	Twickenham Stoop	14,800	Aviva Premiership 7th-11th (7th)
(France) La Rochelle	(France) Patrice Collazo (France) Xavier Garbajosa	(France) Uini Atonio	Stade Marcel-Deflandre	15,000	Top 14 7th-12th (9th)
(France) Lyon	(France) Pierre Mignoni	(France) Julien Puricelli	Matmut Stadium	11,805	Pro D2 Champion
(England) Newcastle Falcons	(England) Dean Richards	(England) Will Welch	Kingston Park	10,200	Aviva Premiership 7th-11th (11th)
(Wales) Newport Gwent Dragons	(Wales) Kingsley Jones	(Wales) T. Rhys Thomas	Rodney Parade	8,800	Pro12 bottom 5 (11th)
(Wales) Ospreys	(Wales) Steve Tandy	(Wales) Alun Wyn Jones	Liberty Stadium; Millennium Stadium	20,827; 74,500	Pro12 bottom 5 (8th)
(France) Pau	(New Zealand) Simon Mannix	(France) Julien Pierre	Stade du Hameau	13,819	Top 14 7th-12th (11th)
(France) Stade Français	(Argentina) Gonzalo Quesada	(Italy) Sergio Parisse	Stade Jean-Bouin	20,000	Top 14 7th-12th (12th)
(Romania) Timișoara Saracens	(New Zealand) Grainger Heikell	(Romania) Cătălin Fercu	Stadionul Dan Păltinișanu	32,972	Challenge Cup Qualification play-off
(England) Worcester Warriors	(Scotland) Carl Hogg	(South Africa) Gerrit-Jan van Velze	Sixways Stadium	12,024	Aviva Premiership 7th-11th (10th)

== Seeding ==
The 20 competing teams were seeded and split into four tiers; seeding was based on performance in their respective domestic leagues. Where promotion and relegation is in effect in a league, the promoted team was seeded last, or (if multiple teams are promoted) by performance in the lower tier.

Rank	Top 14	Premiership	Pro 12	Qualifying Competition
1	(France) Brive	(England) Harlequins	(Wales) Cardiff Blues	(Russia) Enisey-STM
2	(France) La Rochelle	(England) Gloucester	(Wales) Ospreys	(Romania) Timișoara Saracens
3	(France) Grenoble	(England) Bath	(Scotland) Edinburgh	
4	(France) Pau	(England) Worcester Warriors	(Wales) Newport Gwent Dragons	
5	(France) Stade Français	(England) Newcastle Falcons	(Italy) Treviso	
6	(France) Lyon	(England) Bristol		
7	(France) Bayonne			

Teams were taken from a league in order of rank and put into a tier. A draw was used to allocate two second seeds to Tier 1; the remaining team went into Tier 2. This allocation indirectly determined which fourth-seeded team entered Tier 2, while the others entered Tier 3.

Given the nature of the Qualifying Competition, a competition including developing rugby nations and Italian clubs not competing in the Pro12, Rugby Europe 1 and Rugby Europe 2 were automatically included in Tier 4, despite officially being ranked 1/2 from that competition.

The brackets show each team's seeding and their league (for example, 1 Top 14 indicates the team was seeded 1st from the Top 14).

Tier 1	(England) Harlequins (1 AP)	(Wales) Cardiff Blues (1 Pro12)	(France) Brive (1 Top 14)	(Wales) Ospreys (2 Pro12)	(France) La Rochelle (2 Top 14)
Tier 2	(England) Gloucester (2 AP)	(England) Bath (3 AP)	(Scotland) Edinburgh (3 Pro12)	(France) Grenoble (3 Top 14)	(England) Worcester Warriors (4 AP)
Tier 3	(France) Pau (4 Top 14)	(Wales) Newport Gwent Dragons (4 Pro12)	(England) Newcastle Falcons (5 AP)	(Italy) Treviso (5 Pro12)	(France) Stade Français (5 Top 14)
Tier 4	(England) Bristol (6 AP)	(France) Lyon (6 Top 14)	(France) Bayonne (7 Top 14)	(Russia) Enisey-STM (QC 1)	(Romania) Timișoara Saracens (QC 2)

The following restrictions applied to the draw:

- The 5 pools each contain four clubs, one from each of the 4 Tiers.
- Each pool is required to have one club from each league, drawn from Tier 1, 2 or 3. A second team will only be added to a pool during the Tier 4 allocation.

== Pool stage ==
The draw took place on 29 June 2016, in Neuchâtel, Switzerland.

Teams played each other twice, both at home and away, in the group stage, that began on weekend of 13/14/15/16 October 2016, and continued through to 19/20/21/22 January 2017, before the pool winners and three best runners-up progressed to the quarter finals.

Teams were awarded competition points, based on match result. Teams received 4 points for a win, 2 points for a draw, 1 attacking bonus point for scoring four or more tries in a match and 1 defensive bonus point for losing a match by seven points or fewer.

In the event of a tie between two or more teams, the following tie-breakers were used, as directed by EPCR:

1. Where teams have played each other
  1. The club with the greater number of competition points from only matches involving tied teams.
  2. If equal, the club with the best aggregate points difference from those matches.
  3. If equal, the club that scored the most tries in those matches.
2. Where teams remain tied and/or have not played each other in the competition (i.e. are from different pools)
  1. The club with the best aggregate points difference from the pool stage.
  2. If equal, the club that scored the most tries in the pool stage.
  3. If equal, the club with the fewest players suspended in the pool stage.
  4. If equal, the drawing of lots will determine a club's ranking.

Key to colours
Winner of each pool, advance to quarter-finals.
Three highest-scoring second-place teams advance to quarter-finals.
Cannot advance to the quarter-finals.

=== Pool 1 ===
Pos	Team	Pld	W	D	L	PF	PA	PD	TF	TA	TB	LB	Pts
1	(England) Gloucester (2)	6	5	0	1	237	110	+127	31	15	5	0	25
2	(France) La Rochelle (6)	6	5	0	1	203	104	+99	28	11	4	0	24
3	(Italy) Benetton Treviso	6	2	0	4	75	182	−107	9	23	0	0	8
4	(France) Bayonne	6	0	0	6	116	235	−119	14	33	0	1	1

Source: espn.co.uk

=== Pool 2 ===
Pos	Team	Pld	W	D	L	PF	PA	PD	TF	TA	TB	LB	Pts
1	(Wales) Ospreys (1)	6	6	0	0	279	51	+228	42	7	6	0	30
2	(France) Lyon	6	3	0	3	187	164	+23	26	21	4	0	16
3	(England) Newcastle Falcons	6	2	0	4	158	180	−22	22	26	2	2	12
4	(France) Grenoble	6	1	0	5	74	303	−229	8	44	1	0	5

Source: espn.co.uk

=== Pool 3 ===
Pos	Team	Pld	W	D	L	PF	PA	PD	TF	TA	TB	LB	Pts
1	(France) Brive (5)	6	5	0	1	175	120	+55	16	13	3	0	23
2	(Wales) Newport Gwent Dragons	6	3	0	3	150	140	+10	19	19	2	0	14
3	(England) Worcester Warriors	6	2	0	4	147	117	+30	22	13	2	3	13
4	(Russia) Enisey-STM	6	2	0	4	107	202	−95	13	27	1	0	9

Source: espn.co.uk

=== Pool 4 ===
Pos	Team	Pld	W	D	L	PF	PA	PD	TF	TA	TB	LB	Pts
1	(England) Bath (4)	6	5	0	1	214	91	+123	24	10	3	0	23
2	(Wales) Cardiff Blues (7)	6	5	0	1	150	115	+35	16	15	2	0	22
3	(England) Bristol	6	2	0	4	138	181	−43	19	22	2	0	10
4	(France) Pau	6	0	0	6	97	212	−115	13	25	0	2	2

Source: espn.co.uk

=== Pool 5 ===
Pos	Team	Pld	W	D	L	PF	PA	PD	TF	TA	TB	LB	Pts
1	(Scotland) Edinburgh (3)	6	5	0	1	215	122	+93	30	15	3	1	24
2	(France) Stade Français (8)	6	4	0	2	152	108	+44	20	16	3	1	20
3	(England) Harlequins	6	3	0	3	230	113	+117	34	14	4	2	18
4	(Romania) Timișoara Saracens	6	0	0	6	26	280	−254	2	41	0	0	0

Source: espn.co.uk

=== Pool winners and runners-up rankings ===
Seed	Pool Winners	Pts	+/−	TF
1	(Wales) Ospreys	30	+228	42
2	(England) Gloucester	25	+127	31
3	(Scotland) Edinburgh	24	+93	30
4	(England) Bath	23	+123	24
5	(France) Brive	23	+55	21
Seed	Pool Runners-Up	Pts	+/−	TF
6	(France) La Rochelle	24	+99	28
7	(Wales) Cardiff Blues	22	+35	16
8	(France) Stade Français	20	+44	20
9	(France) Lyon	16	+23	26
10	(Wales) Newport Gwent Dragons	14	+10	19

== Knock-out stage ==
=== Format ===
The eight qualifiers were ranked according to performance in the pool stages, and compete in the quarter-finals, which was held on the weekend of 30/31 March, 1/2 April 2017. The top four teams hosted the quarter-finals against the lower teams in a 1v8, 2v7, 3v6 and 4v5 format.

The semi-finals were played on the weekend of 21/22/23 April 2017. In lieu of the draw that used to determine the semi-final pairing, EPCR announced that a fixed semi-final bracket would be set in advance, and that home advantage would be awarded to a side based on "performances by clubs during the pool stages as well as the achievement of a winning a quarter-final match away from home".

Home advantage was awarded as follows:

Winner of QF		Semi-Final 1 (Home v Away)
1	4	1 v 4
1	5	5 v 1
8	4	8 v 4
8	5	5 v 8

Winner of QF		Semi-Final 2 (Home v Away)
3	2	2 v 3
3	7	7 v 3
6	2	6 v 2
6	7	6 v 7

The winners of the semi-finals contested the final at Murrayfield on 12 May 2017.

=== Bracket ===
Quarter-finals
3	(Scotland) Edinburgh	22
6	(France) La Rochelle	32
2	(England) Gloucester	46
7	(Wales) Cardiff Blues	26
1	(Wales) Ospreys	21
8	(France) Stade Français	25
4	(England) Bath	34
5	(France) Brive	20

Semi-finals
3	(France) La Rochelle	14
2	(England) Gloucester	16
8	(France) Stade Français	28
4	(England) Bath	25

Final
2	(England) Gloucester	17
8	(France) Stade Français	25

=== Quarter-finals ===
31 March 2017
20:00

Edinburgh (Scotland) (3)	22–32	(6) (France) La Rochelle
Try: Burleigh 19' c Ford 39' m Watson 46' c Con: Tovey (1/2) 20'; Hidalgo-Clyne (1/1) 48'; Pen: Weir (1/1) 65'	Report	Try: Maurouard (2) 5' c, 11' c Retiere 24' m Barry 35' c Con: James (3/4) 6', 13', 35'; Pen: James (2/3) 69', 79'

Murrayfield Stadium
Attendance: 5,489
Referee: Luke Pearce (RFU)

1 April 2017
12:45

Bath (England) (4)	34–20	(5) (France) Brive
Try: Faletau (2) 21' c, 43' c Homer 27' m Rokoduguni (2) 31' m, 75' c Con: Priestland (3/5) 22', 44', 77'; Pen: Priestland (1/1) 9'	Report	Try: Sanconnie (2) 49' c, 55' c Con: Germain (2/2) 50', 56'; Pen: Germain (2/2) 14', 19'

Recreation Ground
Attendance: 11,677
Referee: Marius Mitrea (FIR)

1 April 2017
20:05

Gloucester (England) (2)	46–26	(7) (Wales) Cardiff Blues
Try: Moriarty 10' c Marshall (2) 25' c, 58' c May 54' c Atkinson 65' c Purdy 78' m Con: Burns (1/1) 10'; Twelvetrees (4/5) 26', 55', 60', 66'; Pen: Burns (1/1) 17'; Twelvetrees (1/1) 23'	Report	Try: Cuthbert (2) 4' c, 34' c Con: Shingler (2/2) 5', 35'; Pen: Shingler (3/3) 14', 21', 49'; Drop: Anscombe (1/1) 39'

Kingsholm Stadium
Attendance: 11,206
Referee: Pascal Gaüzère (FFR)

2 April 2017
17:45

Ospreys (Wales) (1)	21–25	(8) (France) Stade Français
Try: Matavesi 47' m Ardron 76' c Con: Biggar (1/2) 76'; Pen: Biggar (3/3) 13', 33', 53'	Report	Try: Zhvania 30' m Lakafia 54' c Arias 59' c Con: Plisson (2/3) 54', 59'; Pen: Plisson (2/2) 28', 44'

Millennium Stadium, Cardiff
Attendance: 12,127
Referee: Matthew Carley (RFU)

=== Semi-finals ===
22 April 2017
21:00

La Rochelle (France)	14–16	(England) Gloucester
Try: Lagrange 66' m Pen: James (3/5) 24', 40', 65'	Report	Try: Burns 59' c Con: Burns (1/1) 59'; Pen: Burns (3/3) 9', 18', 56'

Stade Marcel-Deflandre
Attendance: 15,000
Referee: Andrew Brace (IRFU)

23 April 2017
13:30

Stade Français (France)	28–25	(England) Bath
Try: Doumayrou 12' c Plisson 48' m Pyle 78' c Con: Plisson (2/3) 12', 78'; Pen: Plisson (2/2) 5', 17'; Drop: Plisson (1/1) 80'	Report	Try: Rokoduguni 63' c Fruean 68' m Stooke 71' c Con: Ford (2/3) 63', 71'; Pen: Ford (2/2) 10', 34'

Stade Jean-Bouin
Attendance: 10,175
Referee: John Lacey (IRFU)

=== Final ===
12 May 2017
20:00

Gloucester (England)	17–25	(France) Stade Français
Try: May 14' c Moriarty 79' c Con: Burns (2/2) 15', 79'; Pen: Burns (1/1) 22'	Report	Try: Parisse 32' c Danty 57' m Doumayrou 71' c Con: Plisson (1/2) 32'; Steyn (1/1) 72'; Pen: Plisson (1/1) 27'; Steyn (1/1) 75'

Murrayfield Stadium, Edinburgh
Attendance: 24,494
Referee: John Lacey (IRFU)

FB	15	(New Zealand) Tom Marshall
RW	14	(England) Charlie Sharples
OC	13	(Scotland) Matt Scott		(substituted off) 62'
IC	12	(England) Mark Atkinson		(substituted off) 72'
LW	11	(England) Jonny May
FH	10	(Ireland) Billy Burns
SH	9	(England) Willi Heinz (c)	(yellow card) 33' to 43'	(substituted off) 43'
N8	8	(England) Ben Morgan
OF	7	(England) Lewis Ludlow
BF	6	(Wales) Ross Moriarty
RL	5	(New Zealand) Jeremy Thrush		(substituted off) 75'
LL	4	(England) Tom Savage		(substituted off) 60'
TP	3	(New Zealand) John Afoa		(substituted off) 22'
HK	2	(Wales) Richard Hibbard		(substituted off) 73'
LP	1	(New Zealand) Josh Hohneck		(substituted off) 63'
Substitutes:
HK	16	(England) Darren Dawidiuk		(substituted on) 73'
PR	17	(England) Yann Thomas		(substituted on) 63'
PR	18	(Ireland) Paddy McAllister		(substituted on) 22'
LK	19	(Argentina) Mariano Galarza		(substituted on) 60'
LK	20	(England) Freddie Clarke		(substituted on) 75'
SH	21	(Scotland) Greig Laidlaw		(substituted on) 43'
CE	22	(England) Billy Twelvetrees		(substituted on) 62'
CE	23	(England) Henry Trinder		(substituted on) 72'
Coach:
(Ireland) David Humphreys

FB	15	(France) Hugo Bonneval
RW	14	(Fiji) Waisea Nayacalevu
OC	13	(France) Geoffrey Doumayrou
IC	12	(France) Jonathan Danty	(substituted off) 73'
LW	11	(France) Djibril Camara
FH	10	(France) Jules Plisson	(substituted off) 67'
SH	9	(Australia) Will Genia	(substituted off) 70'
N8	8	(Italy) Sergio Parisse (c)
OF	7	(South Africa) Jono Ross
BF	6	(France) Antoine Burban	(substituted off) 59'
RL	5	(France) Paul Gabrillagues
LL	4	(Australia) Hugh Pyle	(substituted off) 67'
TP	3	(France) Rabah Slimani	(substituted off) 41'
HK	2	(France) Rémi Bonfils	(substituted off) 73'
LP	1	(South Africa) Heinke van der Merwe	(substituted off) 69'
Substitutions:
HK	16	(France) Laurent Panis	(substituted on) 73'
PR	17	(Georgia (country)) Zurabi Zhvania	(substituted on) 69'
PR	18	(Samoa) Paul Alo-Emile	(substituted on) 41'
LK	19	(South Africa) Willem Alberts	(substituted on) 67'
FL	20	(France) Raphaël Lakafia	(substituted on) 59'
SH	21	(France) Julien Dupuy	(substituted on) 70'
FH	22	(South Africa) Morné Steyn	(substituted on) 67'
CE	23	(France) Jérémy Sinzelle	(substituted on) 73'
Coach:
(Argentina) Gonzalo Quesada

== Attendances ==
- Does not include final as this is held at a neutral venue.

Club	Home Games	Total	Average	Highest	Lowest	% Capacity
(England) Bath	4	49,570	12,393	13,257	11,677	85%
(France) Bayonne	3	8,703	2,901	5,005	1,498	17%
(Italy) Benetton Treviso	3	4,100	1,367	1,900	700	25%
(England) Bristol	3	28,988	9,663	13,140	7,559	36%
(France) Brive	3	11,500	3,833	5,000	2,500	24%
(Wales) Cardiff Blues	3	21,752	7,251	7,569	6,960	60%
(Scotland) Edinburgh	4	20,105	5,026	5,489	4,055	29%
(Russia) Enisey-ETM	3	2,800	933	1,500	300	18%
(England) Gloucester	4	39,367	9,842	11,206	9,265	61%
(France) Grenoble	3	20,607	6,869	7,003	6,754	42%
(England) Harlequins	3	29,692	9,897	11,820	8,230	67%
(France) La Rochelle	4	56,910	14,228	15,000	13,123	95%
(France) Lyon	3	27,472	9,157	12,080	6,500	77%
(England) Newcastle Falcons	3	10,448	3,483	3,551	3,390	34%
(Wales) Newport Gwent Dragons	3	11,766	3,922	4,126	3,544	46%
(Wales) Ospreys	4	33,504	8,376	12,127	6,986	30%
(France) Pau	3	23,635	7,878	9,212	6,050	57%
(France) Stade Francais	4	31,363	7,841	10,175	6,511	39%
(Romania) Timișoara Saracens	2 (Note: Timișoara Saracens only played 2 home games as their final home game was cancelled due to a frozen pitch.)	6,500	3,250	3,500	3,000	10%
(England) Worcester Warriors	3	20,474	6,825	7,209	6,097	57%

== See also ==
- 2016–17 European Rugby Champions Cup
