= 2017–18 European Rugby Challenge Cup =

Club rugby union competition

Tournament details
- Countries: England; France; Italy; Ireland; Russia; Scotland; Wales; Romania
- Tournament format(s): Round-robin and Knockout
- Date: 12 October 2017 – 11 May 2018

Tournament statistics
- Teams: 20
- Matches played: 67
- Attendance: 438,380 (6,543 per match)
- Highest attendance: 32,543; Cardiff Blues v Gloucester (11 May 2018)
- Lowest attendance: 500; Enisei-STM v Newcastle Falcons (20 October 2017); Krasny Yar v London Irish (20 January 2018)
- Tries scored: 457 (6.82 per match)
- Top point scorer(s): Jack Carty (Connacht); Jarrod Evans (Cardiff Blues) (56 points)
- Top try scorer(s): Adam Radwan (Newcastle Falcons) (10 tries)

Final
- Venue: San Mamés Stadium, Bilbao
- Champions: (Wales) Cardiff Blues (2nd title)
- Runners-up: (England) Gloucester

The 2017–18 European Rugby Challenge Cup was the fourth edition of the European Rugby Challenge Cup, an annual second-tier rugby union competition for professional clubs. It was also the 22nd season of the Challenge Cup competition in all forms, following on from the now defunct European Challenge Cup. Clubs from six European nations plus two Russian club competed for the title.

The first round of the group stage began on the weekend of 12/13/14/15 October 2017, and the competition ended with the final on 11 May 2018 in Bilbao, Spain. This was the first time the final has been held outside one of the Six Nations countries.

French side Stade Français were the reigning champions but failed to progress past the quarter-finals after losing to Newcastle Falcons. Gloucester returned to the final having lost to Stade Français last season, where they faced Cardiff Blues, who made it their first final of any competition since their 2010 European Challenge Cup Final victory. Like then, Cardiff Blues were victorious, defeating Gloucester 31–30 with a 78th-minute penalty by Gareth Anscombe to clinch the title.

== Teams ==
20 teams qualified for the 2017–18 European Rugby Challenge Cup; a total of 18 qualified from across the Premiership, Pro14 and Top 14, as a direct result of their domestic league performance, with two coming through a play-off. The expected distribution of teams is:

- England: 5 clubs
  - Any teams finishing between 8th-11th position in the Aviva Premiership. (4 Teams)
  - The winner of the Greene King IPA Championship, London Irish. (1 Team)
- France: 8 clubs
  - Any teams finishing between 8th-12th position in the Top 14. (5 Teams)
  - The champion, Oyonnax and the winner of the promotion play-off, Agen, from the Pro D2. (2 Teams)
  - There will be an eighth team from France, as the French representative in the Champions Cup play-off (Stade Français) did not qualify for the 2017–18 European Rugby Champions Cup. (1 Team)
- Ireland, Italy, Scotland & Wales: 5 clubs
  - Any teams that did not qualify for the European Rugby Champions Cup, or the play-off, through the Guinness Pro12. (3 teams)
  - Two sides (Wales' Cardiff Blues, and Ireland's Connacht), having lost during the play-off semi-finals. (2 Teams)
- Russia: 2 clubs
  - Two Russian teams qualified through the 2016–17 Continental Shield, which took place alongside the Challenge Cup and Champions Cup competitions.

The following clubs qualified for the Challenge Cup.

Aviva Premiership	Top 14	Pro12				Qualifying Competition
England	France	Ireland	Italy	Scotland	Wales	Russia
Newcastle Falcons; Gloucester; Sale Sharks; Worcester Warriors; London Irish (RFU Championship winner)	Stade Français; Brive; Pau; Lyon; Bordeaux; Toulouse; Oyonnax (Pro D2 champion); Agen (Pro D2 Play-off winner)	Connacht	Zebre	Edinburgh	Cardiff Blues; Dragons	Enisey-STM; Krasny Yar

=== 20th team play-off ===
Four clubs competed in a play-off to decide the final team in the Champions Cup. The play-off comprised three matches, contested by one team from the Premiership, one from the Top 14, and two from the Pro14.

The two Pro12 teams each played one of the Premiership or Top 14 sides in a single-leg semi-final, held at the home ground of the non-Pro12 side. The winners of these matches then contested a play-off final, with the winner of this match competing in the 2017–18 European Rugby Champions Cup. The three losing teams were all entered in the Challenge Cup.

The following teams took part:

Aviva Premiership	Top 14	Pro 12	
England	France	Ireland	Wales
Northampton Saints	Stade Français	Connacht	Cardiff Blues

==== Matches ====
A draw was held on 15 March 2017 to determine the two semi-final matches, and which semi-final's winner would have home advantage in the final.

Semi-finals

19 May 2017
18:00 CEST

Stade Français (France)	46 – 21	(Wales) Cardiff Blues
	Report

Stade Jean-Bouin
Attendance: 4,767
Referee: Greg Garner (RFU)

20 May 2017
16:00 BST

Northampton Saints (England)	21 – 15	(Ireland) Connacht
	Report

Franklin's Gardens
Attendance: 9,561
Referee: Mathieu Raynal (FFR)

Play-off final

26 May 2017
19:45 BST

Northampton Saints (England)	23 – 22	(France) Stade Français
	Report

Franklin's Gardens
Attendance: 10,273
Referee: John Lacey (IRFU)

=== Continental Shield ===
Eight teams were split into two pools of four to compete in the re-branded European Rugby Continental Shield. Each team played the four teams in the other pool once. The winner of each pool then played a two-legged final against last year's qualifying sides, and the winners, on aggregate, will take the two remaining places in the Challenge Cup.

==== Play-offs ====
1 April 2017

Mogliano (Italy)	0 – 46	(Russia) Enisey-STM

Stadio Maurizio Quaggia

22 April 2017

Enisey-STM (Russia)	51 – 7	(Italy) Mogliano

Slava Stadium, Moscow

- Enisey-STM beat Mogliano 97 – 7 on aggregate.

1 April 2017

Krasny Yar (Russia)	12 – 17	(Romania) Timișoara Saracens

Rustavi Arena, Georgia

22 April 2017

Timișoara Saracens (Romania)	18 – 27	(Russia) Krasny Yar

Stadionul Dan Păltinișanu

- Krasny Yar beat Timișoara Saracens 39 – 35 on aggregate.

=== Team details ===
Below is the list of coaches, captain and stadiums with their method of qualification for each team.

Note: Placing shown in brackets, denotes standing at the end of the regular season for their respective leagues, with their end of season positioning shown through CH for Champions, RU for Runner-up, SF for losing Semi-finalist and QF for losing Quarter-finalist.

Team	Coach / Director of Rugby	Captain	Stadium	Capacity	Method of Qualification
(France) Agen	(France) Philippe Sella	(France) Antoine Miquel	Stade Armandie	14,000	Pro D2 play-off winner
(France) Brive	(France) Nicolas Godignon	(Algeria) Saïd Hirèche	Stade Amédée-Domenech; Stade Alexandre-Cueille (Note: Brive had to play their last pool game at the Stade Alexandre-Cueille in Tulle after the pitch at their home ground Stade Amédée-Domenech was deemed unplayable and the match was rescheduled for a later kick off at the rearranged venue.)	13,979; 3,000	Top 14 8th-12th (8th)
(France) Bordeaux Bègles	(England) Rory Teague (For (France) Jacques Brunel) (Note: Jacques Brunel began the tournament as Bordeaux Bègles' head coach, but was appointed as the head coach of the French national team in late 2017. Rory Teague was brought in as Brunel's replacement.)	(France) Clément Maynadier	Stade Chaban-Delmas	34,694	Top 14 8th-12th (11th)
(Wales) Cardiff Blues	(England) Danny Wilson	(Wales) Gethin Jenkins	BT Cardiff Arms Park	12,125	Champions Cup play-off loser
(Ireland) Connacht	(New Zealand) Kieran Keane	(Ireland) John Muldoon	Galway Sportsgrounds	8,100	Champions Cup play-off loser
(Wales) Dragons	(Ireland) Bernard Jackman	(Wales) Cory Hill	Rodney Parade	8,500	Pro12 bottom 4 (11th)
(Scotland) Edinburgh	(England) Richard Cockerill	(Scotland) Fraser McKenzie	Murrayfield; Myreside Stadium (Note: Myreside Stadium was listed as the venue for all of Edinburgh's pool stage matches. However, all games were relocated at separate times leading up to the weekend's fixtures due worries over an unplayable pitch. Games were later played at Murrayfield.)	67,144 (Note: Although Murrayfield's full capacity is 67,144, only the lower section of the West Stand, with a capacity of 12,464, is generally opened for Edinburgh fixtures.); 5,500	Pro12 bottom 4 (9th)
(Russia) Enisey-STM	(Russia) Alexander Pervukhin	(Latvia) Uldis Saulite	Krasny Yar Stadium; Slava Stadium (Moscow); Avchala Stadium (Tbilisi)	3,600; 2,500; 2,500	Qualification play-off winner
(England) Gloucester	(Ireland) David Humphreys	(New Zealand) Willi Heinz	Kingsholm Stadium	16,115	Premiership 8th-11th (9th)
(Russia) Krasny Yar	(Russia) Igor Nikolaychuk	(Russia) Vasily Artemyev	Krasny Yar Stadium; Fili Stadium (Moscow); Avchala Stadium (Tbilisi)	3,600; 1,000; 2,500	Qualification play-off winner
(England) London Irish	(England) Nick Kennedy	(England) David Paice	Madejski Stadium	24,161	RFU Championship Champion
(France) Lyon	(France) Pierre Mignoni	(France) Julien Puricelli	Stade de Gerland	25,000	Top 14 8th-12th (10th)
(England) Newcastle Falcons	(England) Dean Richards	(England) Will Welch	Kingston Park	10,200	Premiership 8th-11th (8th)
(France) Oyonnax	(France) Adrien Buononato	(New Zealand) Roimata Hansell-Pune	Stade Charles-Mathon; Stade de Genève (Note: Oyonnax opening game against Connacht will be played at Stade de Genève in Switzerland.)	11,400; 30,084	Pro D2 Champion
(France) Pau	(New Zealand) Simon Mannix	(France) Julien Tomas	Stade du Hameau	18,324	Top 14 8th-12th (9th)
(England) Sale Sharks	(England) Steve Diamond	(England) Will Addison	AJ Bell Stadium	12,000	Premiership 8th-11th (10th)
(France) Stade Français	(New Zealand) Greg Cooper	(Italy) Sergio Parisse	Stade Jean-Bouin	20,000	Champions Cup play-off runner-up
(France) Toulouse	(France) Ugo Mola	(Samoa) Joe Tekori	Stade Ernest-Wallon	19,500	Top 14 8th-12th (12th)
(England) Worcester Warriors	(South Africa) Alan Solomons (For (South Africa) Gary Gold) (Note: Gary Gold began the tournament as Worcester Warriors head coach, but was granted an early release to take up his new role as head coach of the United States. Alan Solomons was Gold's replacement.)	(Ireland) Donncha O'Callaghan	Sixways Stadium	12,024	Premiership 8th-11th (11th)
(Italy) Zebre	(Ireland) Michael Bradley	(Italy) George Biagi	Stadio Sergio Lanfranchi	5,000	Pro12 bottom 4 (12th)

== Seeding ==
The 20 competing teams were seeded and split into four tiers; seeding was based on performance in their respective domestic leagues. Where promotion and relegation is in effect in a league, the promoted team was seeded last, or (if multiple teams are promoted) by performance in the lower competition.

Rank	Top 14	Premiership	Pro 12	Continental Shield
1	(France) Stade Français	(England) Newcastle Falcons	(Wales) Cardiff Blues	(Russia) Enisey-STM
2	(France) Brive	(England) Gloucester	(Ireland) Connacht	(Russia) Krasny Yar
3	(France) Pau	(England) Sale Sharks	(Scotland) Edinburgh	
4	(France) Lyon	(England) Worcester Warriors	(Wales) Dragons	
5	(France) Bordeaux	(England) London Irish	(Italy) Zebre	
6	(France) Toulouse			
7	(France) Oyonnax			
8	(France) Agen			

Teams will be taken from a league in order of rank and put into a tier. A draw was used to allocate two second seeds to Tier 1; the remaining team went into Tier 2. This allocation indirectly determined which fourth-seeded team entered Tier 2, while the others entered Tier 3.

Given the nature of the Continental Shield, a competition including developing rugby nations and Italian clubs not competing in the Pro12, qualifying teams are automatically included in Tier 4, and are, in effect, seeded equally despite officially being ranked 1/2 from that competition.

The brackets show each team's seeding and their league (for example, 1 Top 14 indicates the team was seeded 1st from the Top 14).

Tier 1	(England) Newcastle Falcons (1 AP)	(Wales) Cardiff Blues (1 Pro12)	(France) Stade Français (1 Top 14)	(England) Gloucester Rugby (2 AP)	(France) Brive (2 Top 14)
Tier 2	(Ireland) Connacht (2 Pro12)	(England) Sale Sharks (3 AP)	(Scotland) Edinburgh (3 Pro12)	(France) Pau (3 Top 14)	(Wales) Dragons (4 Pro12)
Tier 3	(England) Worcester Warriors (4 AP)	(France) Lyon (4 Top 14)	(England) London Irish (5 AP)	(France) Bordeaux (5 Top 14)	(Italy) Zebre (5 Pro 12)
Tier 4	(France) Toulouse (6 Top 14)	(France) Oyonnax (7 Top 14)	(France) Agen (8 Top 14)	(Russia) Enisey-STM (CS 1)	(Russia) Krasny Yar (CS 2)

== Pool stage ==
The draw took place on 8 June 2017, in Neuchâtel, Switzerland.

Teams in the same pool play each other twice, both at home and away in the group stage, beginning on the weekend of 12/13/14 October 2017, and continuing through to 19/20 January 2018, before the pool winners and three best runners-up progressed to the quarter-finals.

Teams are awarded competition points, based on match result. Teams receive 4 points for a win, 2 points for a draw, 1 attacking bonus point for scoring four or more tries in a match and 1 defensive bonus point for losing a match by seven points or fewer.

In the event of a tie between two or more teams, the following tie-breakers will be used, as directed by EPCR:

1. Where teams have played each other
  1. The club with the greater number of competition points from only matches involving tied teams.
  2. If equal, the club with the best aggregate points difference from those matches.
  3. If equal, the club that scored the most tries in those matches.
2. Where teams remain tied and/or have not played each other in the competition (i.e. are from different pools)
  1. The club with the best aggregate points difference from the pool stage.
  2. If equal, the club that scored the most tries in the pool stage.
  3. If equal, the club with the fewest players suspended in the pool stage.
  4. If equal, the drawing of lots will determine a club's ranking.

Key to colours
Winner of each pool, advance to quarter-finals.
Three highest-scoring second-place teams advance to quarter-finals.

=== Pool 1 ===
Pos	Team	Pld	W	D	L	PF	PA	PD	TF	TA	TB	LB	Pts
1	(England) Newcastle Falcons (2)	6	6	0	0	229	122	+107	33	15	4	0	28
2	(Wales) Dragons	6	3	0	3	156	133	+23	21	17	2	2	16
3	(France) Bordeaux Bègles	6	3	0	3	190	178	+12	26	24	3	1	16
4	(Russia) Enisei-STM	6	0	0	6	91	233	−142	12	36	0	1	1

Source: espn.co.uk

=== Pool 2 ===
Pos	Team	Pld	W	D	L	PF	PA	PD	TF	TA	TB	LB	Pts
1	(Wales) Cardiff Blues (5)	6	5	0	1	99	95	+4	12	10	1	0	21
2	(France) Toulouse	6	2	1	3	117	120	−3	14	13	2	2	14
3	(England) Sale Sharks	6	2	1	3	110	102	+8	12	11	0	2	12
4	(France) Lyon	6	2	0	4	121	130	−9	13	17	0	3	11

Source: espn.co.uk

=== Pool 3 ===
Pos	Team	Pld	W	D	L	PF	PA	PD	TF	TA	TB	LB	Pts
1	(France) Pau (1)	6	6	0	0	207	125	+82	28	16	5	0	29
2	(England) Gloucester (6)	6	4	0	2	253	139	+114	37	18	4	1	21
3	(Italy) Zebre	6	1	0	5	133	257	−124	16	37	2	2	8
4	(France) Agen	6	1	0	5	148	220	−72	20	30	2	0	6

Source: espn.co.uk

=== Pool 4 ===
Pos	Team	Pld	W	D	L	PF	PA	PD	TF	TA	TB	LB	Pts
1	(Scotland) Edinburgh (4)	6	5	0	1	282	98	+184	40	12	4	1	25
2	(France) Stade Français (8)	6	3	0	3	151	166	−15	21	21	3	2	17
3	(England) London Irish	6	3	0	3	169	154	+15	24	22	3	1	16
4	(Russia) Krasny Yar	6	1	0	5	106	290	−184	13	43	1	1	6

Source: espn.co.uk

=== Pool 5 ===
Pos	Team	Pld	W	D	L	PF	PA	PD	TF	TA	TB	LB	Pts
1	(Ireland) Connacht (3)	6	5	1	0	225	102	+123	29	15	4	0	26
2	(France) Brive (7)	6	3	0	3	161	162	−1	23	19	4	1	17
3	(England) Worcester Warriors	6	2	1	3	124	133	−9	16	17	3	2	15
4	(France) Oyonnax	6	1	0	5	102	215	−113	11	28	0	0	4

Source: espn.co.uk

=== Ranking of pool leaders and runners-up ===
Rank	Pool Leaders	Pts	Diff	TF
1	(France) Pau	29	+82	28
2	(England) Newcastle Falcons	28	+107	33
3	(Ireland) Connacht	26	+123	29
4	(Scotland) Edinburgh	25	+184	40
5	(Wales) Cardiff Blues	21	+4	12
Rank	Pool Runners–up	Pts	Diff	TF
6	(England) Gloucester	21	+114	37
7	(France) Brive	17	–1	23
8	(France) Stade Français	17	–15	21
9	(Wales) Dragons	16	+23	21
10	(France) Toulouse	14	–3	14

== Knock-out stage ==
=== Format ===
The eight qualifiers are ranked according to their performance in the pool stage and compete in the quarter-finals which was held on the weekend of 30/31 March 2018. The four top teams hosted the quarter-finals against the four lower teams in a 1v8, 2v7, 3v6 and 4v5 format.

The semi-finals were played on the weekend of 20/21/22 April 2018. In lieu of the draw that used to determine the semi-final pairing, EPCR announced that a fixed semi-final bracket would be set in advance, and that the home team would be designated based on "performances by clubs during the pool stages as well as the achievement of a winning a quarter-final match away from home".

Home advantage was awarded as follows:

Winner of QF		Semi-final 1 (Home v Away)
1	4	1 v 4
1	5	5 v 1
8	4	8 v 4
8	5	5 v 8

Winner of QF		Semi-final 2 (Home v Away)
3	2	2 v 3
3	7	7 v 3
6	2	6 v 2
6	7	6 v 7

=== Bracket ===
Quarter-finals
4	(Scotland) Edinburgh	6
5	(Wales) Cardiff Blues	20
1	(France) Pau	35
8	(France) Stade Français	32
3	(Ireland) Connacht	28
6	(England) Gloucester	33
2	(England) Newcastle Falcons	25
7	(France) Brive	10

Semi-finals
5	(Wales) Cardiff Blues	16
1	(France) Pau	10
6	(England) Gloucester	33
2	(England) Newcastle Falcons	12

Final
5	(Wales) Cardiff Blues	31
6	(England) Gloucester	30

=== Quarter-finals ===
30 March 2018
20:00

Newcastle Falcons (England) (2)	25–10	(7) (France) Brive
Try: S. Wilson 17' c Kibirige 23' m Tait (2) 58' m, 67' m Con: Flood (1/4) 18'; Pen: Hodgson (1/1) 80'	Report	Try: Herjean 27' c Con: Bézy (1/1) 28'; Pen: Bézy (1/1) 22'

Kingston Park
Attendance: 4,053
Referee: John Lacey (IRFU)

30 March 2018
21:00

Pau (France) (1)	35–32	(8) (France) Stade Français
Try: Vatubua 4' c Stanley 22' c Daubagna 37' c Lespiaucq-Brettes 52' m Con: Taylor (3/4) 5', 23', 38'; Pen: Taylor (3/4) 16', 31', 74'	Report	Try: Daguin 6' c Francoz 40' c Camara 43' c O'Connor 78' m Con: Plisson (3/4) 6', 40', 44'; Pen: Plisson (2/2) 42', 59'

Stade du Hameau
Attendance: 10,064
Referee: JP Doyle (RFU)

31 March 2018
13:00

Connacht (Ireland) (3)	28–33	(6) (England) Gloucester
Try: Marmion 7' m Aki 19' m Adeolokun 45' m Healy 70' c Con: Ronaldson (1/1) 71'; Pen: J. Carty (1/1) 49'; Ronaldson (1/1) 67'	Report	Try: Hanson 3' m Marshall 26' m Trinder 37' m Afoa 55' c Con: Williams (2/4) 38', 57'; Pen: Williams (2/2) 42', 63'; Twelvetrees (1/1) 77'

Galway Sportsgrounds
Attendance: 8,129
Referee: Romain Poite (FFR)

31 March 2018
17:45

Edinburgh (Scotland) (4)	6–20	(5) (Wales) Cardiff Blues
Pen: Van der Walt (2/2) 18', 48'	Report	Try: E. Jenkins 21' c Scully 29' c Con: Evans (2/2) 22', 31'; Pen: Evans (2/4) 50', 65'

Murrayfield
Attendance: 7,065
Referee: Mathieu Raynal (FFR)

=== Semi-finals ===
20 April 2018
19:45

Gloucester (England) (6)	33–12	(2) (England) Newcastle Falcons
Try: Matu'u 40' c Burns 46' m Vellacott 74' c Con: Twelvetrees (2/3) 40', 75'; Pen: Twelvetrees (2/2) 58', 68'	Report	Try: Lawson (2) 8' m 53' c Con: Hodgson (1/2) 54'

Kingsholm
Attendance: 10,857
Referee: Pascal Gaüzère (FFR)

21 April 2018
13:00

Cardiff Blues (Wales) (5)	16–10	(1) (France) Pau
Try: Anscombe 5' c Con: Evans (1/1) 6'; Pen: Evans (3/3) 23', 38', 73'	Report	Try: Smith 19' c Con: Taylor (1/1) 20'; Pen: Taylor (1/2) 34'

Cardiff Arms Park
Attendance: 11,723
Referee: John Lacey (IRFU)

=== Final ===
11 May 2018
21:00

Cardiff Blues (Wales)	31–30	(England) Gloucester
Try: T. Williams 41' c Smith 54' c Scully 75' m Con: Evans (2/2) 41', 55'; Pen: Evans (3/3) 4', 15', 50'; Anscombe (1/1) 78'	Report	Try: Trinder 8' c Atkinson 37' c Hanson 58' c Con: Twelvetrees (3/3) 9', 38', 59'; Pen: Twelvetrees (3/3) 26', 40', 62'

San Mamés Stadium, Bilbao
Attendance: 32,543
Referee: Jérôme Garcès (FFR)

== Attendances ==
- Does not include the attendance at the final as it takes place at a neutral venue.

Club	Home Games	Total	Average	Highest	Lowest	% Capacity
(France) Agen	3	9,904	3,301	4,547	2,487	24%
(France) Brive	3	8,300	2,767	4,500	800	27%
(France) Bordeaux Bègles	3	47,909	15,970	17,211	14,232	46%
(Wales) Cardiff Blues	4	29,540	7,385	11,723	4,974	61%
(Ireland) Connacht	4	22,597	5,649	8,129	3,879	70%
(Wales) Dragons	3	11,383	3,794	4,017	3,417	45%
(Scotland) Edinburgh	4	17,866	4,467	7,065	2,773	7%
(Russia) Enisey-ETM	3	4,900	1,633	3,600	500	51%
(England) Gloucester	4	41,762	10,441	12,489	8,927	63%
(Russia) Krasny Yar	3	5,100	1,700	3,600	500	73%
(England) London Irish	3	14,645	4,882	5,800	4,099	20%
(France) Lyon	3	34,485	11,495	12,863	9,218	46%
(England) Newcastle Falcons	4	15,615	3,904	4,053	3,653	38%
(France) Oyonnax	3	10,500	3,500	3,500	3,500	24%
(France) Pau	4	34,493	8,623	10,064	7,700	47%
(England) Sale Sharks	3	14,227	4,742	5,494	3,259	40%
(France) Stade Francais	3	22,682	7,561	8,562	5,666	38%
(France) Toulouse	3	30,811	10,270	12,245	9,104	53%
(England) Worcester Warriors	3	19,918	6,639	6,728	6,520	55%
(Italy) Zebre	3	6,200	2,067	2,500	1,700	41%

== See also ==
- 2017–18 European Rugby Champions Cup
- 2017–18 European Rugby Continental Shield
