= 2017–18 European Rugby Champions Cup =

International sports competition

Tournament details
- Countries: England; France; Ireland; Italy; Scotland; Wales
- Tournament format(s): Round-robin and knockout
- Date: 13 October 2017 – 12 May 2018

Tournament statistics
- Teams: 20
- Matches played: 67
- Attendance: 1,005,537 (15,008 per match)
- Highest attendance: 52,282 – Leinster v Racing 92 (12 May 2018)
- Lowest attendance: 2,600 – Benetton v Scarlets (16 December 2017)
- Tries scored: 366 (5.46 per match)
- Top point scorer(s): Owen Farrell (Saracens) (92 points)
- Top try scorer(s): Dan Evans (Ospreys) (6 tries)

Final
- Venue: San Mamés Stadium, Bilbao
- Attendance: 52,282
- Champions: (Ireland) Leinster (4th title)
- Runners-up: (France) Racing 92

The 2017–18 European Rugby Champions Cup was the fourth European Rugby Champions Cup championship (23rd overall), the annual rugby union club competition for teams from the top six nations in European rugby and was the twenty-third season of pan-European professional club rugby competition.

The format of the competition began with a play-off qualification round at the end of the preceding season featuring teams from England, France, Ireland and Wales. The winner joined 19 teams already qualified by way of their domestic league position in the pool stage of the competition - a home and away round-robin for five groups of four teams. Following the pool stage, five pool winners, and three highest ranked runners-up, qualified for the quarter-finals of the competition, as the Cup thereafter reverted to a single elimination knockout format.

The tournament began on 13 October 2017. The final was won by Leinster on 12 May 2018 at San Mamés Stadium in Bilbao, Spain. This was Leinster's fourth title, tying the record for the most successful team in the competition's history. This was the first time the final was held outside one of the Six Nations countries.

== Teams ==
Twenty clubs from the three major European domestic and regional leagues competed in the Champions Cup. Nineteen of these qualified directly as a result of their league performance.

The distribution of teams was:

- England: 7 clubs
  - The top 6 clubs in the English Premiership. (6 clubs)
  - The winner of the Champions Cup play-off, Northampton Saints. (1 club)
- France: 6 clubs
  - The top 6 clubs in the Top 14. (6 clubs)
- Ireland, Italy, Scotland & Wales: 7 clubs, based on performance in the Pro12.
  - The best placed club from each nation. (4 clubs)
  - The 3 highest ranked clubs not qualified thereafter. (3 clubs)

The following teams qualified for the 2017–18 tournament.

Aviva Premiership	Top 14	Pro12			
England	France	Ireland	Italy	Scotland	Wales
Exeter Chiefs; Wasps; Saracens; Leicester Tigers; Bath; Harlequins; Northampton Saints (Play-off winner)	Clermont; Toulon; La Rochelle; Racing 92; Montpellier; Castres	Munster; Leinster; Ulster	Benetton	Glasgow Warriors	Scarlets; Ospreys

=== 20th team play-off ===
The play-off system that had been suspended the season before, due to the 2015 Rugby World Cup, returned to decide the final team competing in the Champions Cup.

Four clubs competed in a play-off to decide the final team in the Champions Cup.

The play-off comprised 3 matches, contested by one team from the Aviva Premiership, one from the Top 14, and two from the Guinness Pro12.

The two Pro12 teams played either the Premiership or Top 14 side in a single-leg semi-final, held at the home ground of the non-Pro12 side. The winners of these matches then played in a play-off final, and the winner of this match took the 20th place in the Champions Cup. The three losing teams will all compete in the 2017–18 European Rugby Challenge Cup.

The following teams took part:

Aviva Premiership	Top 14	Pro12	
England	France	Ireland	Wales
Northampton Saints	Stade Français	Connacht	Cardiff Blues

==== Matches ====
A draw was held on 15 March 2017 to determine the two semi-final matches, and the semi-final winner that would have home advantage in the final.

Semi-finals

19 May 2017
18:00 CEST

Stade Français (France)	46 – 21	(Wales) Cardiff Blues
	Report

Stade Jean-Bouin
Attendance: 4,767
Referee: Greg Garner (RFU)

20 May 2017
16:00 BST

Northampton Saints (England)	21 – 15	(Ireland) Connacht
	Report

Franklin's Gardens
Attendance: 9,561
Referee: Mathieu Raynal (FFR)

Play-off final

26 May 2017
19:45 BST

Northampton Saints (England)	23 – 22	(France) Stade Français
	Report

Franklin's Gardens
Attendance: 10,273
Referee: John Lacey (IRFU)

=== Team details ===
Below is the list of coaches, captain and stadiums with their method of qualification for each team.

Note: Placing shown in brackets, denotes standing at the end of the regular season for their respective leagues, with their end of season positioning shown through CH for Champions, RU for Runner-up, SF for losing Semi-finalist and QF for losing Quarter-finalist.

Team	Coach / Director of Rugby	Captain	Stadium	Capacity	Method of Qualification
(England) Bath	(New Zealand) Todd Blackadder	(England) Matt Garvey	Recreation Ground	14,500	Aviva Premiership top 6 (5th)
(Italy) Benetton	(New Zealand) Kieran Crowley	(Italy) Dean Budd	Stadio Comunale di Monigo	6,700	Pro12 top Italian team (10th)
(France) Castres	(France) Christophe Urios	(France) Mathieu Babillot	Stade Pierre-Fabre (Note: Castres' stadium was known as Stade Pierre-Antoine when the Champions Cup field was set. By the time of the opening round, the venue had been renamed after late club owner Pierre Fabre.)	12,500	Top 14 top 6 (5th) (QF)
(France) Clermont	(France) Franck Azéma	(France) Damien Chouly	Stade Marcel-Michelin	19,022	Top 14 top 6 (2nd) (CH)
(England) Exeter Chiefs	(England) Rob Baxter	(England) Jack Yeandle	Sandy Park	12,800	Aviva Premiership top 6 (2nd) (CH)
(Scotland) Glasgow Warriors	(New Zealand) Dave Rennie	(Scotland) Ryan Wilson	Scotstoun Stadium	7,351	Pro12 top Scottish team (6th)
(England) Harlequins	(England) John Kingston	(Australia) James Horwill	Twickenham Stoop	14,800	Aviva Premiership top 6 (6th)
(France) La Rochelle	(France) Patrice Collazo (France) Xavier Garbajosa	(New Zealand) Jason Eaton	Stade Marcel-Deflandre	16,000	Top 14 top 6 (1st) (SF)
(England) Leicester Tigers	(Australia) Matt O'Connor	(England) Tom Youngs	Welford Road	25,800	Aviva Premiership top 6 (4th) (SF)
(Ireland) Leinster	(Ireland) Leo Cullen	(Fiji) Isa Nacewa	RDS Arena; Aviva Stadium	18,500; 51,700	Pro12 top 7 (2nd) (SF)
(France) Montpellier	(New Zealand) Vern Cotter	(France) Louis Picamoles	Altrad Stadium	15,697	Top 14 top 6 (3rd) (QF)
(Ireland) Munster	(South Africa) Johann van Graan (For (South Africa) Rassie Erasmus) (Note: Having announced in June 2017 that Rassie Erasmus will leave Munster in December 2017, Johann van Graan was appointed the new Director of Rugby in September 2017. He started his appointment in November 2017 ahead of Round 9.)	(Ireland) Peter O'Mahony	Thomond Park	26,200	Pro12 top Irish team (1st) (RU)
(England) Northampton Saints	(England) Alan Dickens (For (England) Jim Mallinder) (Note: Jim Mallinder began the tournament as Northampton Saints' head coach, but stood down effective immediately on 12 December 2017. Attack coach Alan Dickens was promoted up to interim head coach.)	(England) Dylan Hartley	Franklin's Gardens	15,500	Play-off winner
(Wales) Ospreys	(Wales) Steve Tandy	(Wales) Alun Wyn Jones	Liberty Stadium	20,827	Pro12 top 7 (4th) (SF)
(France) Racing 92	(France) Laurent Labit (France) Laurent Travers	(France) Dimitri Szarzewski	Stade Yves-du-Manoir; U Arena (Note: Racing 92 moved to U Arena on 22 December 2017; the new venue hosted Racing 92's final home pool game.)	14,000; 30,681	Top 14 top 6 (6th) (SF)
(England) Saracens	(Ireland) Mark McCall	(England) Brad Barritt	Allianz Park	10,000	Aviva Premiership top 6 (3rd) (SF)
(Wales) Scarlets	(New Zealand) Wayne Pivac	(Wales) Ken Owens	Parc y Scarlets	14,870	Pro12 top Welsh team (3rd) (CH)
(France) Toulon	(France) Fabien Galthié	(South Africa) Duane Vermeulen	Stade Mayol	18,200	Top 14 top 6 (4th) (RU)
(Ireland) Ulster	(Australia) Les Kiss	(Ireland) Rory Best	Kingspan Stadium	18,196	Pro12 top 7 (5th)
(England) Wasps	(Wales) Dai Young	(England) Joe Launchbury	Ricoh Arena	32,609	Aviva Premiership top 6 (1st) (RU)

== Seeding ==
The twenty competing teams are seeded and split into four tiers, each containing five teams.

For the purpose of creating the tiers, clubs are ranked based on their domestic league performances and on their qualification for the knockout phases of their championships, so a losing quarter-finalist in the Top 14 would be seeded below a losing semi-finalist, even if they finished above them in the regular season.

Rank	Top 14	Premiership	Pro12
1	(France) Clermont	(England) Exeter Chiefs	(Wales) Scarlets
2	(France) Toulon	(England) Wasps	(Ireland) Munster
3	(France) La Rochelle	(England) Saracens	(Ireland) Leinster
4	(France) Racing 92	(England) Leicester Tigers	(Wales) Ospreys
5	(France) Montpellier	(England) Bath	(Ireland) Ulster
6	(France) Castres	(England) Harlequins	(Scotland) Glasgow Warriors
7		(England) Northampton Saints	(Italy) Benetton

Based on these seedings, teams are placed into one of the four tiers, with the top seed clubs being put in Tier 1. The nature of the tier system means that a draw is needed to allocate two of the three second seed clubs to Tier 1 and to allocate one of the three fourth seed clubs to Tier 2. The tiers are shown below. Brackets show each team's seeding and their league (for example, 1 Top 14 indicates the team was seeded 1st from the Top 14).

Tier 1	(England) Exeter Chiefs (1 AP)	(Wales) Scarlets (1 Pro12)	(France) Clermont (1 Top 14)	(England) Wasps (2 AP)	(Ireland) Munster (2 Pro12)
Tier 2	(France) Toulon (2 Top 14)	(England) Saracens (3 AP)	(Ireland) Leinster (3 Pro12)	(France) La Rochelle (3 Top 14)	(France) Racing 92 (4 Top 14)
Tier 3	(England) Leicester Tigers (4 AP)	(Wales) Ospreys (4 Pro12)	(England) Bath (5 AP)	(Ireland) Ulster (5 Pro12)	(France) Montpellier (5 Top 14)
Tier 4	(England) Harlequins (6 AP)	(Scotland) Glasgow Warriors (6 Pro12)	(France) Castres (6 Top 14)	(Italy) Benetton (7 Pro12)	(England) Northampton Saints (Play-off)

The following restrictions will apply to the draw:

- Each pool will consist of four clubs, one from each Tier in the draw.
- Each pool must have one from each league drawn from Tier 1, 2 or 3. No pool will have a second team from the same league until the allocation of Tier 4 takes place.
- Where two Pro12 clubs compete in the same pool, they must be from different countries.

== Pool stage ==
The draw took place on 8 June 2017, in Neuchâtel, Switzerland.

Teams in the same pool play each other twice, at home and away, in the group stage that begins on the weekend of 13/14/15 October 2017, and continues through to 19/20/21 January 2018. The five pool winners and three best runners-up progress to the quarter finals.

Teams are awarded group points based on match performances. Four points are awarded for a win, two points for a draw, one attacking bonus point for scoring four or more tries in a match and one defensive bonus point for losing a match by seven points or fewer.

In the event of a tie between two or more teams, the following tie-breakers will be used, as directed by EPCR:

1. Where teams have played each other
  1. The club with the greater number of competition points from only matches involving tied teams.
  2. If equal, the club with the best aggregate points difference from those matches.
  3. If equal, the club that scored the most tries in those matches.
2. Where teams remain tied and/or have not played each other in the competition (i.e. are from different pools)
  1. The club with the best aggregate points difference from the pool stage.
  2. If equal, the club that scored the most tries in the pool stage.
  3. If equal, the club with the fewest players suspended in the pool stage.
  4. If equal, the drawing of lots will determine a club's ranking.

Key to colours
Winner of each pool, advance to quarter-finals.
Three highest-scoring second-place teams advance to quarter-finals.

=== Pool 1 ===
Team	P	W	D	L	PF	PA	Diff	TF	TA	TB	LB	Pts
(France) La Rochelle (5)	6	4	0	2	156	121	+35	18	17	3	1	20
(England) Wasps	6	3	0	3	154	121	+33	21	15	4	1	17
(Ireland) Ulster	6	4	0	2	132	118	+14	15	15	1	0	17
(England) Harlequins	6	1	0	5	106	188	–82	15	22	2	1	7

=== Pool 2 ===
Team	P	W	D	L	PF	PA	Diff	TF	TA	TB	LB	Pts
(France) Clermont (2)	6	5	0	1	165	104	+61	16	14	2	0	22
(England) Saracens (8)	6	3	1	2	205	146	+59	24	13	3	1	18
(Wales) Ospreys	6	2	1	3	152	148	+4	18	16	3	2	15
(England) Northampton Saints	6	1	0	5	115	239	–124	16	31	2	0	6

=== Pool 3 ===
Team	P	W	D	L	PF	PA	Diff	TF	TA	TB	LB	Pts
(Ireland) Leinster (1)	6	6	0	0	176	93	+83	22	12	3	0	27
(England) Exeter Chiefs	6	3	0	3	138	117	+21	18	14	1	2	15
(France) Montpellier	6	2	0	4	130	163	–33	18	23	3	2	13
(Scotland) Glasgow Warriors	6	1	0	5	128	199	–71	18	27	2	1	7

=== Pool 4 ===
Team	P	W	D	L	PF	PA	Diff	TF	TA	TB	LB	Pts
(Ireland) Munster (3)	6	4	1	1	167	87	+80	18	8	2	1	21
(France) Racing 92 (7)	6	4	0	2	128	105	+23	14	10	1	2	19
(France) Castres	6	2	1	3	111	161	–50	13	20	2	0	12
(England) Leicester Tigers	6	1	0	5	118	171	–53	12	19	1	2	7

=== Pool 5 ===
Team	P	W	D	L	PF	PA	Diff	TF	TA	TB	LB	Pts
(Wales) Scarlets (4)	6	4	0	2	162	123	+39	19	12	3	2	21
(France) Toulon (6)	6	4	0	2	159	125	+34	16	12	1	2	19
(England) Bath	6	4	0	2	151	121	+30	15	14	1	1	18
(Italy) Benetton	6	0	0	6	97	200	−103	12	25	2	2	4

=== Ranking of pool leaders and runners-up ===
Rank	Pool Leaders	Pts	Diff	TF
1	(Ireland) Leinster	27	+83	22
2	(France) Clermont	22	+61	16
3	(Ireland) Munster	21	+80	18
4	(Wales) Scarlets	21	+39	19
5	(France) La Rochelle	20	+35	18
Rank	Pool Runners–up	Pts	Diff	TF
6	(France) Toulon	19	+34	16
7	(France) Racing 92	19	+23	14
8	(England) Saracens	18	+69	24
9	(England) Wasps	17	+33	21
10	(England) Exeter Chiefs	15	+21	18

== Knock-out stage ==
=== Format ===
The eight qualifiers were ranked according to their performance in the pool stage and competed in the quarter-finals which were held on the weekend of 30/31 March, 1 April 2018. The four top teams were at home in the quarter-finals against the four lower teams in a 1v8, 2v7, 3v6 and 4v5 format.

The semi-finals were played on the weekend of 20/21/22 April 2018. In lieu of the draw that used to determine the semi-final pairing, EPCR announced that a fixed semi-final bracket would be set in advance, and that the home team would be designated based on "performances by clubs during the pool stages as well as the achievement of a winning a quarter-final match away from home". Semi-final matches must be played at a neutral ground in the designated home team's country.

Home country advantage was awarded as follows:

Winner of QF		Semi-Final 1 (Home v Away)
1	4	1 v 4
1	5	5 v 1
8	4	8 v 4
8	5	5 v 8

Winner of QF		Semi-Final 2 (Home v Away)
3	2	2 v 3
3	7	7 v 3
6	2	6 v 2
6	7	6 v 7

=== Bracket ===
Quarter-finals
1	(Ireland) Leinster	30
8	(England) Saracens	19
4	(Wales) Scarlets	29
5	(France) La Rochelle	17
2	(France) Clermont	17
7	(France) Racing 92	28
3	(Ireland) Munster	20
6	(France) Toulon	19

Semi-finals
1	(Ireland) Leinster	38
4	(Wales) Scarlets	16
7	(France) Racing 92	27
3	(Ireland) Munster	22

Final
1	(Ireland) Leinster	15
7	(France) Racing 92	12

=== Quarter-finals ===
30 March 2018
17:30

Scarlets (Wales) (4)	29–17	(5) (France) La Rochelle
Try: Patchell 60' c S. Williams 75' c Con: Halfpenny (2/2) 62', 76'; Pen: Halfpenny (5/6) 4', 11', 18', 25', 45'	Report	Try: Sazy 8' c Boudehent 80' c Con: Balès (1/1) 9'; Noble (1/1) 80'; Pen: Balès (1/1) 40'

Parc y Scarlets
Attendance: 15,373 (Note: The Scarlets usual capacity at the Parc y Scarlets is 14,870. The capacity was increased to 15,373 for this game via temporary seating in order to meet minimum standards required for a European knockout game at the quarter-final stage.)
Referee: Luke Pearce (RFU)

31 March 2018
15:15

Munster (Ireland) (3)	20–19	(6) (France) Toulon
Try: Murray 27' c Conway 74' c Con: Keatley (2/2) 28', 75'; Pen: Keatley (2/2) 31', 55'	Report	Try: Ashton 64' c Con: Trinh-Duc (1/1) 65'; Pen: Belleau (1/1) 9'; Trinh-Duc (2/2) 60', 67'; Drop: Belleau (1/1) 18'

Thomond Park
Attendance: 26,265
Referee: Nigel Owens (WRU)

1 April 2018
14:00

Clermont (France) (2)	17–28	(7) (France) Racing 92
Try: Betham 33' m Pen: Parra (4/4) 5', 9', 17', 44'	Report	Try: Nakarawa 24' c Andreu 63' c Palu 65' m Con: Machenaud (2/3) 24', 63'; Pen: Machenaud (3/4) 31', 40', 41'

Stade Marcel-Michelin
Attendance: 18,598
Referee: Wayne Barnes (RFU)

1 April 2018
15:30

Leinster (Ireland) (1)	30–19	(8) (England) Saracens
Try: Ringrose 3' c Leavy 46' c Lowe 57' c Con: Sexton (2/2) 3', 47'; McFadden (1/1) 58'; Pen: Sexton (3/3) 20', 33', 42'	Report	Try: Cowan 63' c Con: Farrell (1/1) 64'; Pen: Farrell (3/3) 11', 15', 26'; Bosch (1/1) 34'

Aviva Stadium
Attendance: 51,700
Referee: Jérôme Garcès (FFR)

=== Semi-finals ===
21 April 2018
15:30

Leinster (Ireland) (1)	38–16	(4) (Wales) Scarlets
Try: J. Ryan 9' c Healy 26' c McFadden 39' c Fardy 49' c Sexton 59' c Con: Sexton (5/5) 10', 27', 40', 51', 60'; Pen: Sexton (1/1) 18'	Report	Try: Beirne 78' c Con: Patchell (1/1) 79'; Pen: Halfpenny (3/3) 5', 21', 33'

Aviva Stadium
Attendance: 48,455
Referee: Romain Poite (FFR)

22 April 2018
16:15

Racing 92 (France) (7)	27–22	(3) (Ireland) Munster
	Report

Stade Chaban-Delmas
Attendance: 24,574
Referee: JP Doyle (RFU)

=== Final ===
12 May 2018
17:45

Leinster (Ireland)	15–12	(France) Racing 92
Pen: Sexton (3/3) 16', 38', 53'; Nacewa (2/2) 73', 78'	Report	Pen: Iribaren (4/5) 3', 21', 44', 70'

San Mamés Stadium, Bilbao
Attendance: 52,282
Referee: Wayne Barnes (RFU)

== Attendances ==
- Does not include the attendance at the final as it takes place at a neutral venue.

Club	Home Games	Total	Average	Highest	Lowest	% Capacity
(England) Bath	3	41,404	13,801	14,422	13,160	95%
(Italy) Benetton	3	10,900	3,633	5,000	2,600	54%
(France) Castres	3	26,515	8,838	9,577	8,400	71%
(France) Clermont	4	73,857	18,464	18,808	18,007	97%
(England) Exeter Chiefs	3	34,705	11,568	12,606	10,672	90%
(Scotland) Glasgow Warriors	3	22,053	7,351	7,351	7,351	100%
(England) Harlequins	3	30,386	10,129	11,705	8,327	68%
(France) La Rochelle	3	48,000	16,000	16,000	16,000	100%
(England) Leicester Tigers	3	59,569	19,856	23,100	18,165	77%
(Ireland) Leinster	5	172,161	34,432	51,700	15,947	90%
(France) Montpellier	3	28,791	9,597	11,000	8,250	61%
(Ireland) Munster	4	96,790	24,198	26,265	22,054	92%
(England) Northampton Saints	3	29,678	9,893	13,320	8,105	64%
(Wales) Ospreys	3	23,563	7,854	9,158	6,947	38%
(France) Racing 92 (Note: Figures include semi-final 'home game' played at the Stade Chaban-Delmas in Bordeaux.)	4	59,129	14,782	24,574	9,067	64%
(England) Saracens	3	21,856	7,285	10,000	2,811	73%
(Wales) Scarlets	4	48,184	12,046	15,373	6,856	80%
(France) Toulon	3	40,912	13,637	13,882	13,489	75%
(Ireland) Ulster	3	45,941	15,314	15,646	15,004	84%
(England) Wasps	3	38,861	12,954	13,124	12,806	40%

== See also ==
- 2017–18 European Rugby Challenge Cup
- 2017–18 European Rugby Continental Shield
