= James Craig (rugby union, born 1988) =

English rugby union player

- Born: James Robert Craig; 8 November 1988 (age 38) Beverley, England
- Height: 6 ft 7 in (201 cm)
- Weight: 249 lb (17 st 11 lb; 113 kg)

Rugby union career
- Position(s): Lock, Back row
- Current team: Northampton Saints
Senior career
Years	Team	Apps	(Points)
2011	Leeds Carnegie	3	(0)
2011-	Northampton Saints	66	(10)
- Correct as of 3 April 2018

James Robert Craig (born 8 November 1988) is an English rugby union player from Beverley.

The lock joined his current club Northampton Saints in 2011 after playing for three games for Leeds Carnegie.

Having now racked up 65 appearances for the Midlands side, Craig helped Saints to the LV= Cup Final in 2012 where they lost to Leicester Tigers.

In May 2016, Craig earned a call-up to the England Saxons and helped the side to a series win in South Africa.

Playing for the club during their double winning season, in which Saints secured both the Aviva Premiership title and the European Rugby Challenge Cup title, Craig recently resigned for the side to prolong his stay in the Midlands.
