= Mark Atkinson (rugby union) =

English rugby union footballer

- Born: Mark James Atkinson; 8 March 1990 (age 36) Knowsley, Merseyside, England
- Height: 1.95 m (6 ft 5 in)
- Weight: 102 kg (16 st 1 lb; 225 lb)
- School: St Ambrose College

Rugby union career
- Position: Centre
Senior career
Years	Team	Apps	(Points)
2008–2010	Sale Sharks	2	(0)
2010–2011	Wasps	2	(3)
2011–2012	Esher	24	(42)
2012–2014	Bedford Blues	42	(61)
2014–2024	Gloucester	170	(140)
- Correct as of 12 March 2024
International career
Years	Team	Apps	(Points)
2010	England U20	2	(0)
2019	Barbarians	1	(10)
2021	England	1	(0)
- Correct as of 6 November 2021

Mark Atkinson (born 8 March 1990) is an English former rugby union player. A centre, he spent a decade with Gloucester and played once for England in 2021.

== Career ==
Atkinson attended Saint Ambrose College in Cheshire and earned a contract with the region's top club Sale Sharks in 2008. He represented England under-20 in their 2010 Six Nations campaign. He joined Wasps in 2010 however after they released him he signed for Esher RFC during the 2011–12 RFU Championship. The following season saw him join Bedford Blues.

In 2014 Atkinson returned to the Premiership with Gloucester Rugby. His first season at the club saw them lift the EPCR Challenge Cup however he did not play due to injury. He started the 2017 Challenge Cup final defeat to Stade Français at Murrayfield and the following year scored a try against Cardiff Blues as they lost consecutive European finals. In 2019 Gloucester finished third in the league and were eliminated by champions Saracens at the semi-final stage.

In June 2019 Atkinson scored two tries for the Barbarians in a friendly against an England XV at Twickenham Stadium. In September 2021 he received his first call-up to the senior England squad by coach Eddie Jones for a training camp. Due to a last minute squad change, Atkinson made his Test debut off the bench against Tonga on 6 November 2021, earning his only cap for England.

After a decade at Kingsholm, Atkinson was awarded a testimonial year with Gloucester Rugby Club which commenced in 2023. He selected two charitable causes to raise funds for during this year: national cancer care charity Hope for Tomorrow and the 4ED campaign. Atkinson is an ambassador for Hope for Tomorrow. The charity builds, owns and maintains a fleet of mobile cancer care units to support the delivery of NHS cancer treatment to patients in their community, including one operating in Gloucestershire, where the charity is also based.

In March 2024 after 170 appearances for the Cherry and Whites, Atkinson confirmed his retirement due to a long-term knee injury. Post-retirement, Atkinson holds a Business Development role with Gloucester Rugby, as well as Gloucestershire-based technology consultancy Emerge Digital.

== Honours ==
Gloucester

- EPCR Challenge Cup: 2014–15
- EPCR Challenge Cup runner up: 2016–17, 2017–18
