= 2015–16 Rugby Pro D2 season =

2015–16 Pro D2
- Countries: France
- Date: 20 August 2015 – 4 June 2016
- Champions: Lyon
- Promoted: Bayonne
- Relegated: Provence, Tarbes
- Matches played: 243

Official website
- www.lnr.fr

The 2015–16 Rugby Pro D2 was the second-level French rugby union club competition, behind the Top 14, for the 2015–16 season. It ran alongside the 2015–16 Top 14 competition; both competitions are operated by the Ligue Nationale de Rugby (LNR).

== Teams ==
Club	City	Stadium	Capacity
Aviron Bayonnais	Bayonne (Pyrénées-Atlantiques)	Stade Jean Dauger	16,900
SC Albi	Albi (Tarn)	Stadium Municipal d'Albi	13,000
Stade Aurillacois	Aurillac (Cantal)	Stade Jean Alric	9,000
AS Béziers Hérault	Béziers (Hérault)	Stade de la Méditerranée	18,500
Biarritz Olympique	Biarritz (Pyrénées-Atlantiques)	Parc des Sports Aguiléra	15,000
CS Bourgoin-Jallieu	Bourgoin-Jallieu (Isère)	Stade Pierre Rajon	10,000
US Carcassonne	Carcassonne (Aude)	Stade Albert Domec	10,000
US Colomiers	Colomiers (Haute-Garonne)	Stade Michel Bendichou	11,400
US Dax	Dax (Landes)	Stade Maurice Boyau	16,170
Lyon OU	Lyon (Rhône)	Matmut Stadium	11,800
US Montauban	Montauban (Tarn-et-Garonne)	Stade Sapiac	12,600
Stade Montois	Mont-de-Marsan (Landes)	Stade Guy Boniface	22,000
RC Narbonne	Narbonne (Aude)	Parc des Sports Et de l'Amitié	12,000
USA Perpignan	Perpignan (Pyrénées-Orientales)	Stade Aimé Giral	16,600
Provence Rugby	Aix-en-Provence (Bouches-du-Rhône)	Stade Maurice David	4,000
Tarbes Pyrénées Rugby	Tarbes (Hautes-Pyrénées)	Stade Maurice Trélut	16,400

Location of teams in Rugby Pro D2 2015–16

Changes in the lineup from 2014–15 were:

- Pau won the 2014–15 Pro D2 title and were thereby automatically promoted to the Top 14. Agen won the promotion playoffs to secure the second promotion place.
- The bottom finisher in 2014–15, Massy was relegated from Pro D2 to Fédérale 1.
- The two bottom finishers in the 2014–15 Top 14 season, Bayonne and Lyon OU, were relegated to Pro D2.
- The Fédérale 1 champion Provence Rugby earned promotion.

== Competition format ==
The top team at the end of the regular season (after all the teams played one another twice, once at home, once away), is declared champion and earns a spot in the next Top 14 season. Teams ranked second to fifth compete in promotion playoffs, with the semifinals being played at the home ground of the higher-ranked team. The final is then played on neutral ground, and the winner earns the second ticket to the next Top 14.

The LNR uses a slightly different bonus points system from that used in most other rugby competitions. It trialled a new system in 2007–08 explicitly designed to prevent a losing team from earning more than one bonus point in a match, a system that also made it impossible for either team to earn a bonus point in a drawn match. LNR chose to continue with this system for subsequent seasons.

France's bonus point system operates as follows:

- 4 points for a win.
- 2 points for a draw.
- 1 bonus point for winning while scoring at least 3 more tries than the opponent. This replaces the standard bonus point for scoring 4 tries regardless of the match result.
- 1 bonus point for losing by 5 points (or less). This is a change from previous seasons, in which the margin was 7 points or less.

== Table ==
2015–16 Rugby Pro D2 table
Pos	Team	Pld	W	D	L	PF	PA	PD	TB	LB	Pts	Promotion or relegation
1	Lyon	30	25	0	5	971	493	+478	13	4	117	Champions automatically promoted to Top 14
2	Bayonne	30	19	1	10	658	602	+56	4	4	86	Winner of the promotion play-offs
3	Aurillac	30	18	0	12	724	613	+111	7	2	81	Qualify for the promotion play-offs
4	Mont De Marsan	30	17	1	12	655	611	+44	5	3	78	Qualify for the promotion play-offs
5	Colomiers	30	16	3	11	629	590	+39	4	4	78	Qualify for the promotion play-offs
6	Béziers	30	17	1	12	745	662	+83	4	3	77	
7	Perpignan	30	15	1	14	676	615	+61	5	6	73	
8	Biarritz	30	14	0	16	674	656	+18	3	5	64	
9	Bourgoin	30	12	0	18	595	642	−47	5	9	62	
10	Albi	30	13	2	15	591	643	−52	2	4	62	
11	Narbonne	30	13	0	17	602	653	−51	2	6	60	
12	Montauban	30	12	0	18	570	624	−54	1	9	58	
13	Tarbes	30	13	0	17	543	630	−87	0	9	53 (Note: Tarbes had 8 points deducted and were automatically relegated at the end of the season.)	Relegation to Fédérale 1
14	Carcassonne	30	11	0	19	484	741	−257	0	5	49	
15	Dax	30	10	1	19	538	713	−175	1	5	48	
16	Provence Rugby	30	10	0	20	549	716	−167	1	5	46	Relegation to Fédérale 1

Rules for classification: When two teams have the same points total, position is calculated by results between teams before points difference.

== Relegation ==
Normally, the teams that finish in 15th and 16th places in the table are relegated to Fédérale 1 at the end of the season. In certain circumstances, "financial reasons" may cause a higher-placed team to be demoted instead, or prevent one of the two finalists in Fédérale 1 from promotion.

This season saw an example of the latter situation. Following the 2015–16 season, 15th-place Dax was spared relegation after Pro D2 side Tarbes was relegated due to excessive debt and failed in an appeal of the decision.

== Play–offs ==
The highest ranked team at the end of the regular season, Lyon OU, earned automatic promotion to the Top 14 as champion de France de PRO D2 2016.

=== Semi–finals ===
The semi–finals followed a 2 v 5, 3 v 4 system, with the higher ranked team playing at home.

28 May 2016
18:00

Stade Aurillacois	28 – 13	Mont-de-Marsan
	Report

Stade Jean Alric
Referee: Salem Attalah

29 May 2016
14:00

Bayonne	28 – 16	Colomiers
	Report

Stade Jean Dauger
Referee: Maxime Chalon

- Under LNR rules, if a playoff match ends level after full-time, the first tiebreaker is try count. Agen advanced with 4 tries to Perpignan's 2.

=== Final ===
The winners of the semi–finals played off for the second promotion spot to the Top 14.

4 June 2016
16:15

Bayonne	21 – 16	Stade Aurillacois
Pen: Moyano (7) 5', 11', 13', 22', 30', 37', 63'	Report	Try: McPhee 78' c Con: Petitjean (1/1); Pen: Petitjean (3) 16', 34', 52'

Stade Ernest-Wallon, Toulouse
Referee: Cyril Lafon

== See also ==
- 2015–16 Top 14 season
