= Scott Armstrong (rugby union) =

English rugby union player

Scott Armstrong (born 3 November 1986 in Lancaster, England) is a rugby union player for Fylde who formerly played for Northampton Saints and Moseley. His usual position is at full-back or wing.

Armstrong switched from Leeds Carnegie to Northampton in the 2010–2011 season, and joined Moseley for the 2013–14 season.

He also teaches at Morecambe Community High School.

In July 2015, he was appointed Strength and Conditioning Coach for Blackpool F.C.

For the 2016–17 season, Armstrong signed for local Lancashire side Fylde playing in National League 1.

For the 2017–18 season he joined Kirkby Lonsdale, who play in Northern Premier.
