= Steve Diamond (rugby union) =

Professional RU coach and former rugby union footballer

- Born: Stephen Diamond; 3 February 1969 (age 57) Partington, Lancashire
- Height: 5 ft 10 in (1.78 m)
- Weight: 220 lb (15 st 10 lb)
- School: Broad Oak Secondary School

Rugby union career
- Position: Hooker
Amateur team(s)
Years	Team	Apps	(Points)
- Trafford MV
Senior career
Years	Team	Apps	(Points)
1989–2000	Sale Sharks	397	(70)
Coaching career
- Years: Team
- 2001: Sale Sharks
- 2001-2004: England Saxons
- 2004–2006: Saracens
- 2008-2011: Russia
- 2011-2020: Sale Sharks
- 2021–2022: Worcester Warriors
- 2022–2023: Edinburgh (consultant)
- 2024–2025: Newcastle Falcons

Steve Diamond (born 3 February 1969) is an English professional rugby union coach and former player.

He was appointed consultant director of rugby at Newcastle Falcons in February 2024.

== Early life ==
Diamond is one of six children, brought up by his mother after his father died when he was 15. He often worked at weekends.

== Rugby career ==
=== Playing career ===
Diamond played for his local club Trafford MV before joining Sale Sharks as a player in 1989. He played over 390 top class games for Sale. He was also called up to the senior England squad for the 1997 England rugby union tour of Argentina and Australia, however he was ultimately not capped at that level. He played in the hooker position.

=== Coaching career ===
Diamond became a coach of the Sharks in 2001 with former teammate Jim Mallinder. Diamond then left Sale and began coaching England Saxons for the 2002 and 2003 Churchill Cups again alongside Jim Mallinder.

Diamond joined Saracens in 2004 as a coach and was praised with bringing many successful players to the club, but was sacked after two and half years after failing to qualify for the Heineken Cup.

In 2007 he teamed up again with Jim Mallinder to head up Northampton Saints recruitment process.

He then accepted the Director of Rugby role for the Russian national team, and in 2010, under Diamond's leadership, Russia qualified for the 2011 Rugby World Cup.

Diamond returned to Sale Sharks in January 2011 as Director of Sport before taking over as Director of Rugby in 2012. On 8 December 2020 Sale announced that Diamond had left the club with immediate effect for personal reasons. It was later revealed that several family issues were the reason for his departure.

He was appointed Lead Rugby Consultant at Worcester Warriors in November 2021. On 25 January 2022 it was confirmed he would take charge of the first team with immediate effect following the departure of Jonathan Thomas. It was also confirmed he would take on the role of Director of Rugby from 2022 to 2023 due to the retirement of Alan Solomons.

His contract at Warriors was terminated along with every other employee on 5 October 2022.

== Personal life ==
Diamond's mother died on 19 November 2020. It was later confirmed his brother had died 12 months previously and his sister had been diagnosed with terminal cancer.

Diamond has had an occasionally direct personal approach.
