= Gareth Denman =

English rugby union player

- Born: Gareth Braxton Denman; 12 November 1990 (age 36) Rotherham, South Yorkshire, England
- Height: 1.80 m (5 ft 11 in)
- Weight: 114 kg (17 st 13 lb; 251 lb)

Rugby union career
- Position: Prop
Senior career
Years	Team	Apps	(Points)
2011–2012	Yorkshire Carnegie	7	(0)
2012	Rotherham Titans	18	(0)
2013–2017	Northampton Saints	75	(0)
2017–2019	Gloucester	25	(5)
2019–2020	Coventry	15	(5)
2020–	Doncaster Knights	0	(0)
- Correct as of 1 June 2017

Gareth Denman (born 12 November 1990) is an English rugby union player for Doncaster Knights in the RFU Championship.

A graduate of their academy, the prop began his rugby career at Leeds Carnegie making his debut for them in 2008 against Sale Sharks in the LV= Cup.

Denman stayed at Leeds for one season after their relegation to the RFU Championship in 2011 but moved to Rotherham Titans, also in the second-tier of English rugby, for the following campaign.

Joining Saints in the Aviva Premiership in 2013, Denman has since made 66 appearances for the Midlands side.

In that time he assisted in Saints' most successful period, featuring the season in which they lifted the Aviva Premiership and playing in the European Rugby Challenge Cup final that same season as the Northampton side completed the double.

This season Denman aided Saints in their campaign for European Rugby Champions Cup rugby for next season as the Northampton side fell to Harlequins on the final day of the Premiership season and therefore entered the play-offs for the final spot in the European competition for that season. Denman featured in both play-offs as Saints defeated both Connacht Rugby (21–15) and Stade Français (23–22) to secure that final top-tier European place.

It was announced earlier this season that Denman would link up with Gloucester Rugby at the conclusion of the 2016/17 Aviva Premiership season after spending four seasons in Northampton.

On 9 April 2019, Denman will return to the RFU Championship with Coventry from the 2019–20 season. After his release from Coventry, Denman signed for Championship rivals Doncaster Knights from the 2020–21 season.
