= Jérémy Sinzelle =

French rugby union player

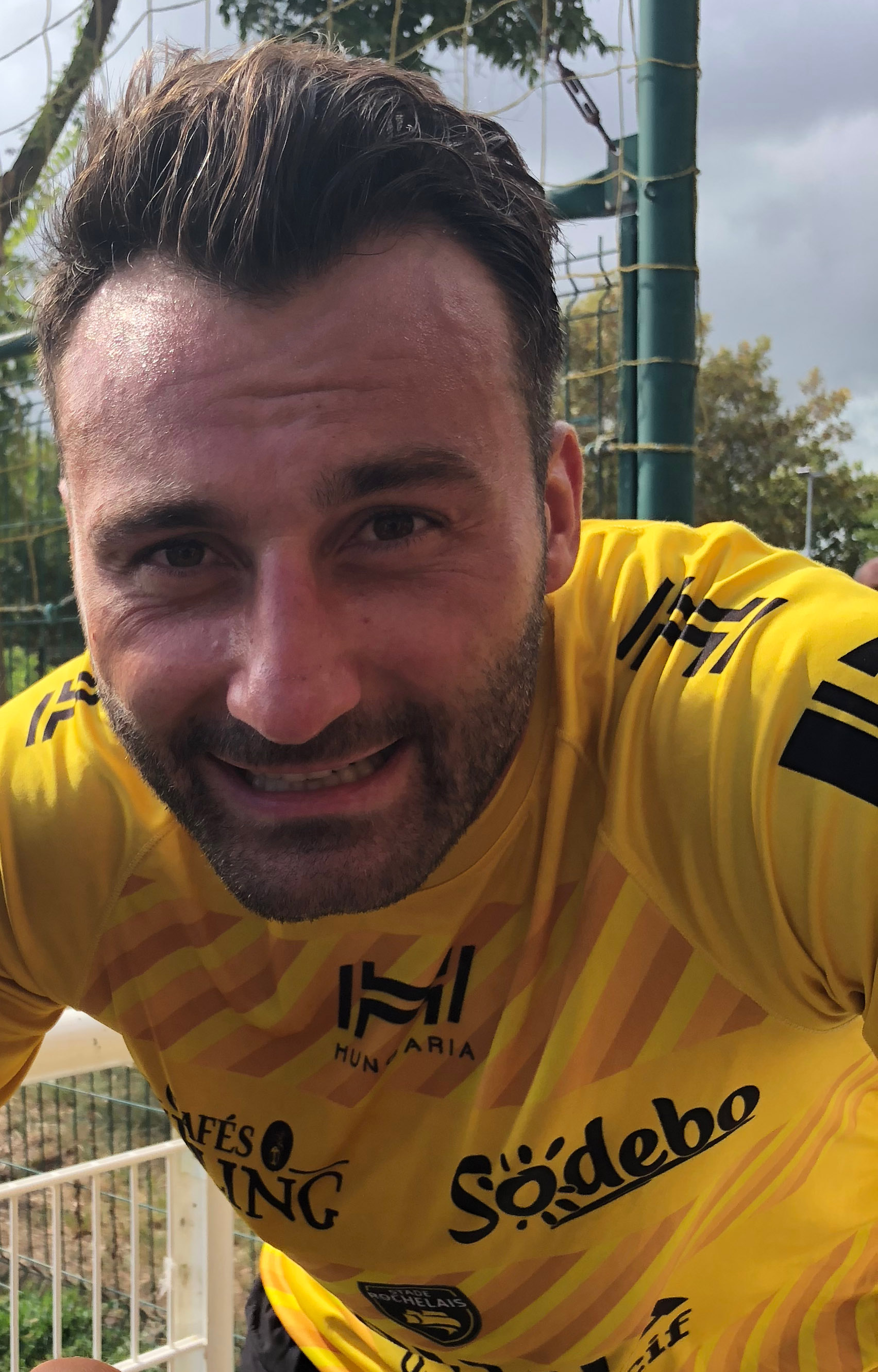
- Born: Jérémy Sinzelle; 2 July 1990 (age 36) Nice, France
- Height: 1.84 m (6 ft 0 in)
- Weight: 95 kg (14 st 13 lb)

Rugby union career
- Position(s): Centre, Wing, Fly-half, Full-back
- Current team: Toulon
Youth career
- 2003–2006: Nice
- 2006–2008: Toulon
Senior career
Years	Team	Apps	(Points)
2008–2012	Toulon	22	(10)
2012–2017	Stade Français	106	(90)
2017–2022	La Rochelle	118	(75)
2022–	Toulon	70	(10)
- Correct as of 23 June 2022
International career
Years	Team	Apps	(Points)
2009–2010	France U20	13	(5)
- Correct as of 23 June 2022

Jérémy Sinzelle (born 2 July 1990) is a French rugby union player. He plays as a centre, wing, fly-half or full-back for Toulon in the Top 14.

== Career ==
After beginning his professional career with Toulon, and before moving to Stade Français in 2012 and La Rochelle in 2017, where he won the European Rugby Champions Cup in 2022, he returned to Toulon at the end of 2021-22 Top 14 season.

== Style of play ==
Sinzelle can be described as a utility back, like James O'Connor or François Steyn, being able to play from 10 to 15 and starting more than ten professional games in each position.

== Honours ==
=== La Rochelle ===
- European Rugby Champions Cup: 2021–22
