= Barry Stewart (rugby union) =

Scotland international rugby union player

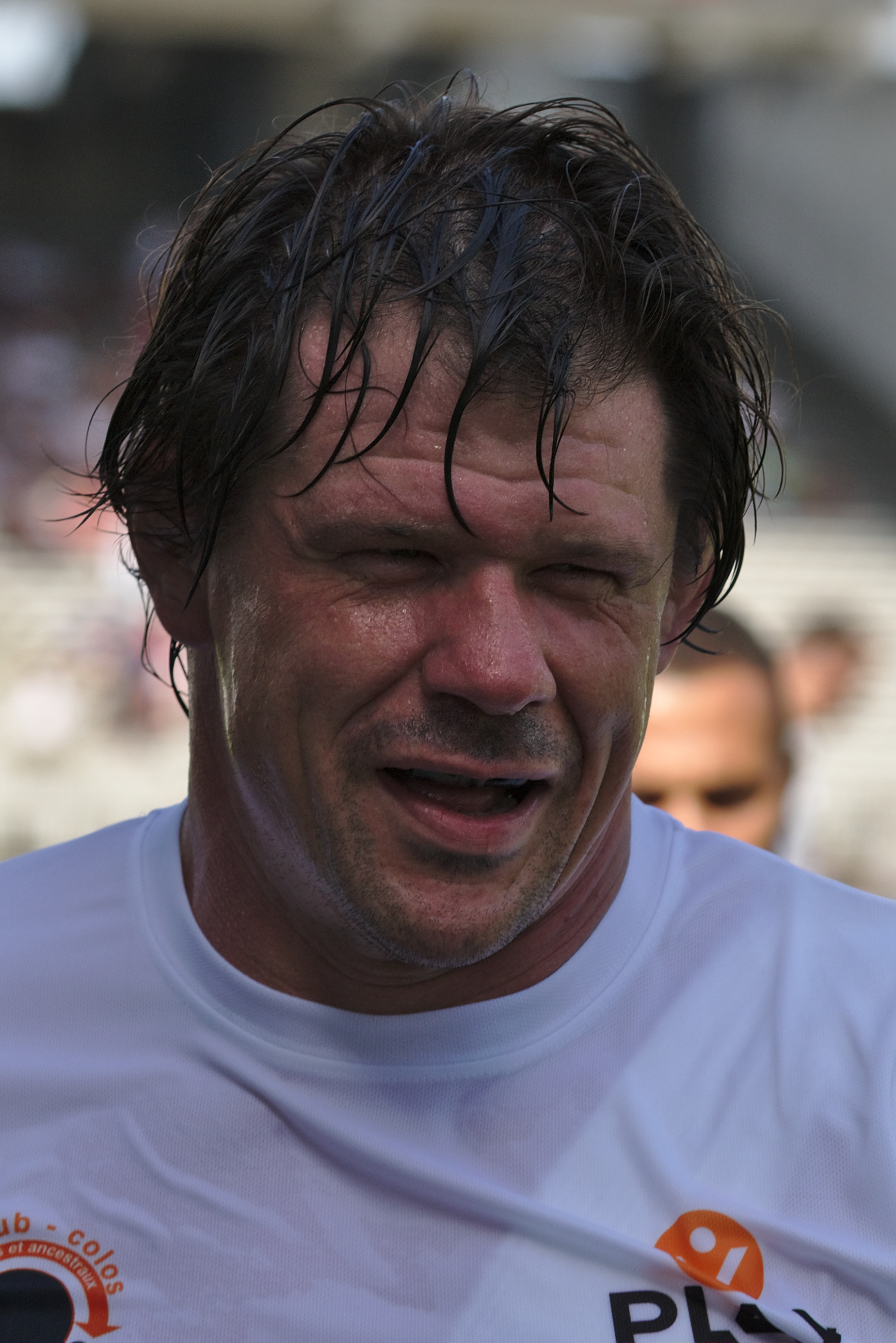
- Born: Barry Douglas Stewart; 3 June 1975 (age 51) Edinburgh, Scotland
- Height: 6 ft 2 in (188 cm)
- Weight: 18 st (252 lb; 114 kg)
- School: Edinburgh Academy

Rugby union career
- Position: Prop
Amateur team(s)
Years	Team	Apps	(Points)
- Edinburgh Academicals
Senior career
Years	Team	Apps	(Points)
1998-2001	Edinburgh Rugby		
2002-2007	Sale Sharks	106	(5)
2007-2009	Northampton Saints	12	(0)
International career
Years	Team	Apps	(Points)
1996-2000	Scotland 'A'	7	
1996-2000	Scotland	4	(0)

Barry Stewart is a former Scotland international rugby union player. He played as a Prop.

== Rugby Union career ==
=== Amateur career ===
He played for Edinburgh Academicals.

=== Professional career ===
He played for Edinburgh Rugby. He received a spinal injury which curtailed his Edinburgh and international career.

On the favourable advice of a neurosurgeon he decided to continue playing. He moved to play for Sale Sharks. In the 2005–2006 season, Stewart played as a replacement in the final as Sale Sharks won their first ever Premiership title.

He also played for Northampton Saints.

=== International career ===
He was capped 7 times for Scotland 'A' between 1996 and 2000.

He played for the full senior Scotland side and won five caps. First capped in June 1996, he was the last amateur era cap to debut for Scotland; as Scottish rugby union belatedly professionalised for season 1996–97, a year behind most other nations.

== Journalistic career ==
He has contributed articles for the rugby union online site The Offside Line.

== Business career ==
He is now an investment manager at Brewin Dolphin.
