= Jim Mallinder =

England international rugby union player & coach

David James Mallinder
- Born: David James Mallinder; 16 March 1966 (age 60) Halifax, Yorkshire
- Height: 6 ft 3 in (1.91 m)
- Weight: 224 lb (102 kg)
- Occupation: Performance coach

Rugby union career
- Position: Coach
- Current team: Scottish Rugby Union (Director of Rugby)
Amateur team(s)
Years	Team	Apps	(Points)
1984–1987	Old Crossleyans		
1986–1987	Halifax RUFC		
1987–1989	Roundhay		
Senior career
Years	Team	Apps	(Points)
1989-2001	Sale Sharks		
International career
Years	Team	Apps	(Points)
1997	England	2	(0)
Coaching career
- Years: Team
- 2001–2004: Sale Sharks
- 2004–2007: England Academy
- 2006–2007: England Saxons
- 2007–2017: Northampton Saints
- 2018–19: England pathway
- 2019-24: Scotland

David James Mallinder is a rugby union coach and former player. He is a former head coach of Sale Sharks, England Under 21s, England Saxons and Northampton Saints. He has worked with Scottish Rugby as performance director.

== Playing career ==
In his playing days, Mallinder was a fullback at Sale Sharks, where he stayed for 15 years as a player and a coach. He was formerly a PE and Mathematics teacher at William Hulme's Grammar School in Manchester before the game turned professional.

He retired from playing in 2001 after nearly 400 games for Sale and two England caps.

== Coaching career ==
=== Sale Sharks and England roles ===
Mallinder was appointed as the Sharks' head coach in 2001 after retiring from his playing career. In his first season, he took the Sharks from 11th to 2nd in the Premiership and their first Heineken Cup qualification. In 2002 he led Sale to the Parker Pen Shield, now the European Challenge Cup, and their first silverware.

In 2004 Mallinder left Sale to take up a post in the RFU's National Academy. There he worked with Brian Ashton and Dorian West, as he masterminded the England Under 21s into winning the Under 21s' version of the Six Nations in 2006 with a clean sweep of five wins out of five. He was also named by UK Sport in their prestigious Elite Coach scheme.

He was subsequently handed the reins of the England Saxons, where he had an impressive record of 15 wins from 16 matches. His last match in charge saw the Saxons defeat the New Zealand Maori at Twickenham to win the Churchill Cup.

=== Northampton Saints ===
In June 2007, Mallinder took up the post of head coach at the recently relegated Northampton Saints. In his first year there, he led the Saints straight back to the Guinness Premiership with an undefeated "perfect" season. On 25 June 2008, he signed a new 3-year contract to remain at Franklin's Gardens until at least the end of the 2010/11 season.

In preparation for the 2008–09 season, Mallinder raided his former club Sale Sharks, signing Ben Foden, Chris Mayor, Christian Day and Ignacio Fernández Lobbe where they joined other former Sale colleagues, Barry Stewart and Nick Johnson. In addition Mallinder brought players like Roger Wilson and Neil Best to the Saints from Ulster, and the squad he put together finished eighth in their first year back in the Premiership, as well as reaching the semi-finals of the Anglo-Welsh Cup. An unbeaten pool campaign in the European Challenge Cup brought home advantage in the knockout stages, and after beating Connacht and Saracens the Saints defeated Bourgoin at the Twickenham Stoop to lift their first piece of major silverware in a decade and secure a place in the Heineken Cup in the process.

The 2009/10 season was another campaign of progression for the Saints, who won their first major domestic trophy, the Anglo-Welsh Cup, by beating Gloucester at Worcester's Sixways Stadium. The Saints won more Premiership games than anyone else to finish second in the table, but were beaten in the semi-final with just a few minutes remaining. In the Heineken Cup the Saints reached the quarter finals.

2010/11 saw Mallinder become the first coach to guide a team unbeaten through the Heineken Cup pool stages and all the way to the final. At the Millennium Stadium the Saints put in their best first half performance in many years, but were pegged back by Leinster and eventually lost the game.

Northampton were defeated by East Midlands rivals Leicester Tigers in the 2012/13 Premiership final, but became Premiership champions for the first time the following year, defeating Saracens in extra time to clinch the 2013/14 season trophy. This followed success in the Amlin Challenge Cup final against Bath Rugby the previous week, representing an historic double trophy winning season for the club. On 2 June 2014 Mallinder signed a new five-year contract, keeping him at Northampton until 2019.

Northampton Saints suffered a series of heavy defeats early in the 2017/18 season, winning one game from ten in all competitions. As a result of this poor run of form, including a heavy defeat to a massively depleted Ospreys side, Mallinder was sacked at the director of rugby on 12 December 2017, with attack coach Alan Dickens taking on the role of head coach in the interim term.

=== England Rugby ===
Mallinder was offered the role of head coach at Cardiff Blues in February 2018 but turned down the role. In June he was announced as the new performance pathway coach at England Rugby, working with young players.

=== Scottish Rugby Union ===
In August 2019 Mallinder was appointed Performance Director of the Scottish Rugby Union.
