= Jules Plisson =

France international rugby union player (born 1991)

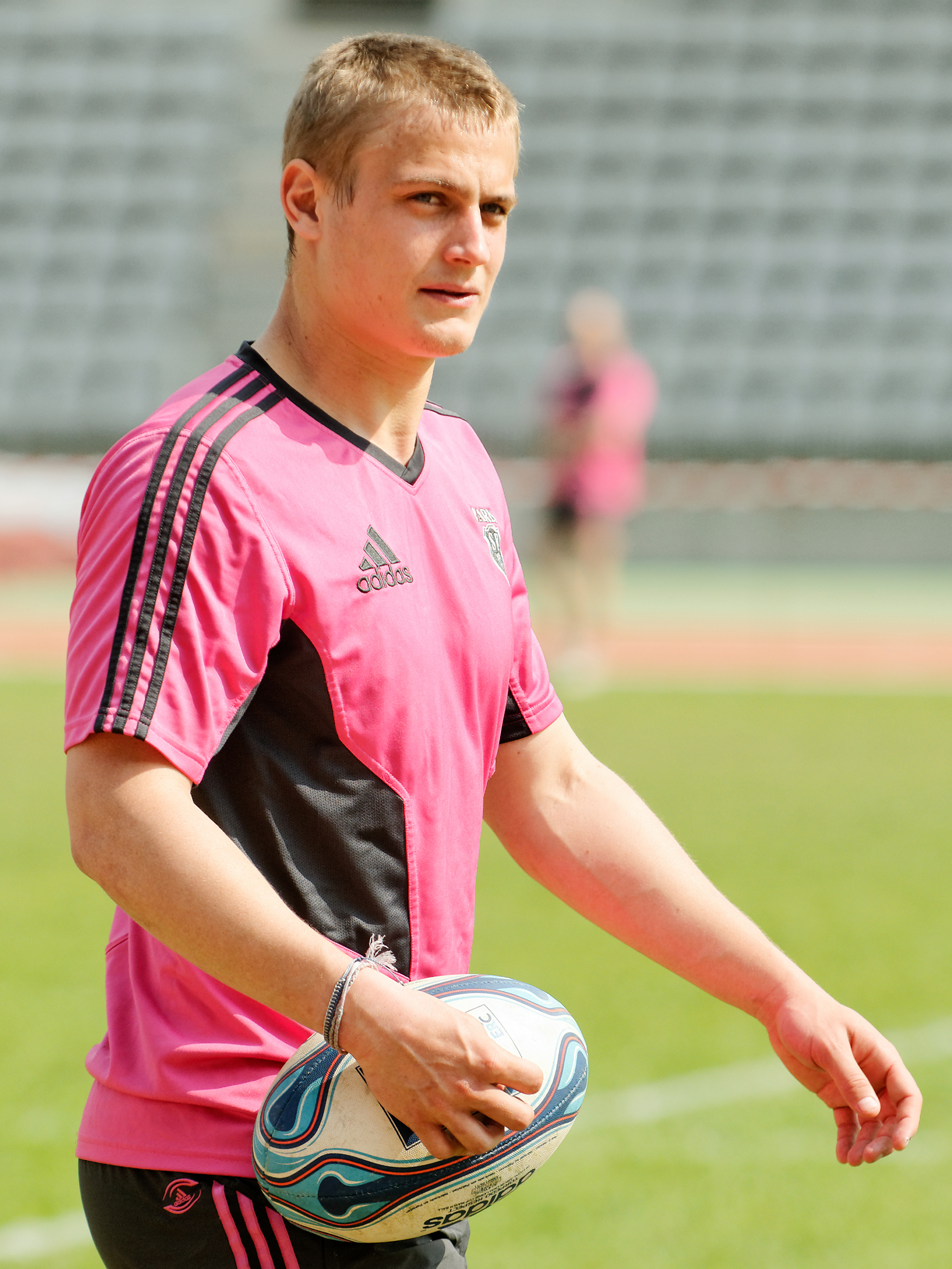
- Jules Plisson during the Stade Français training session held at Stade Charléty, Paris on 3 April 2012.
- Born: 20 August 1991 (age 35) Neuilly-sur-Seine, France
- Height: 1.84 m (6 ft 1/2 in)
- Weight: 92 kg (14 st 7 lb; 203 lb)

Rugby union career
- Position: Fly-half
Senior career
Years	Team	Apps	(Points)
2010–2019	Stade Français	195	(1,168)
2019–2022	La Rochelle	42	(306)
2022–2024	Clermont	36	(160)
2024–	Provence	4	(32)
- Correct as of 15 October 2024
International career
Years	Team	Apps	(Points)
2014–	France	19	(71)
- Correct as of 22 October 2018

Jules Plisson (born 20 August 1991) is a French rugby union player. His position is Fly-half and he currently plays for Provence in the Pro D2.
