= Christian Day =

English rugby union player

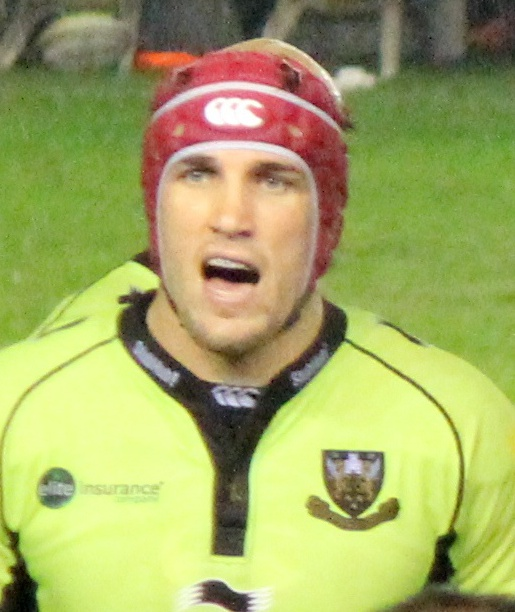
- Born: 24 June 1983 (age 43) Blackpool, Lancashire, England
- Height: 1.96 m (6 ft 5 in)
- Weight: 115 kg (18 st 2 lb)

Rugby union career
- Position: Lock
- Current team: Northampton Saints
Senior career
Years	Team	Apps	(Points)
2003–07	Sale Sharks	99	(5)
2007–08	Stade Français	2	(0)
2008–2018	Northampton Saints	226	(80)
- Correct as of 3 April 2018
International career
Years	Team	Apps	(Points)
- England Saxons
–	England Under 21		
–	England Under 19		
–	England Schools		

Christian Day (born 24 June 1983) is the current General Secretary and CEO of The Rugby Players Association. He is a prominent retired rugby union player and last played for Northampton Saints in the Aviva Premiership. His position of choice was lock.

== Rugby ==
Day began his career at Sale Sharks. He had a short spell at French giants Stade Français arriving as a "Medical Joker" midway through the 2007–08 season. He ended his career at Northampton Saints.

He has won a number of items of silverware throughout his career. He is a two-time winner of the English Premiership, three-time winner of the European Challenge Cup, winner of the English Premiership Cup and A-League Competitions.

Day began his professional career at Sale Sharks in 2001.

Day first won silverware in Sale Sharks colors in the form of the European Challenge Cup in the clubs victory over Pau.

In the 2005–2006 season, Day appeared as a replacement in the final as Sale Sharks won their first ever Premiership title.

Day left Sale Sharks for the French giants Stade Français Paris as a "medical joker" during the 2007–08 season.

Joining Northampton Saints in 2008, Day went on to rack up 232 appearances for the East Midlands side.

In that time, Day helped Saints to lift the Aviva Premiership, European Rugby Challenge Cup twice and the Premiership Cup.

Day was named Players' Player of the Season in the double-winning season by his Saints peers.

Holding the post of the Chairman of the Rugby Players' Association since 2014. Day stepped down from the role in November 2017, handing the role to Harlequins prop Mark Lambert. Day assumed the vice-chair role for the 2017/18 season.

Day was amongst the squad that helped Saints' second team, the Northampton Wanderers, clinch the 2016/17 Aviva 'A' League trophy, though was not in the side for the final against Gloucester United.

== International Rugby ==
In January 2015, he was called up to the senior England squad by Stuart Lancaster, but was ultimately never capped at that level.

Day had previously represented England at every age group level.

== Retirement ==
On 19 April 2018, Day announced that he would be retiring from professional rugby at the end of the 17/18 season. He went on to take up a full-time role at the RPA as their player liaison officer.

In the Summer of 2021 Christian was inducted into the Premiership Rugby Hall of Fame alongside 3 other former players.

== Post Rugby Career ==
In January 2023, Day was elected General Secretary of the Rugby Players Association.

He was elected into the prominent role after a period of significant upheaval for English rugby union in the wake of the COVID pandemic and its negative effects upon the English Premiership and Premiership women's competitions.

His election manifesto included seeking to position the players as respected partners in the game and to bring greater stability and unity for the players. He also pledged to offer membership to all women for the first time and to seek to represent all players equally within the professional game.

He was at the forefront of negotiations for the new Men's Professional Game Partnership He represented the players voice throughout the negotiations., where the RPA notably became signatories to the English games Professional Game Agreement for the first time. He represented the players voice throughout the negotiations.

== Athlete Representation and Governance ==
Day has represented athletes on a number of governance forums:

In 2021 he was added to the UK Anti-Doping athletes commission as a representative for Rugby Union.

Day is a current serving member of the RFU Council, serving as the players representative on the English games governing body

In November 2025 Day was elected Chair of the International Rugby Players General Executive.

== Charitable Fundraising ==
Day has raised in excess of £100'000 for various charitable causes.

His Testimonial year at Northampton Saints, in recognition of his service to the club and the game of rugby union, raised just short of £100'000 for two charitable causes; The Barwell Foundation and Niamh's Next Step

In 2025 Day completed the TCS London Marathon whilst raising £6253 for Restart Rugby

== Personal life ==
In March 2020, Day appeared on the general public edition of BBC TV cookery competition MasterChef, progressing to the final 7. Day studied at Manchester University between 2001 and 2005 to earn a Masters in Engineering and materials science (MEng). He subsequently studied at Salford University to earn a second master's degree in business administration (MBA) between 2018 and 2020.

He has two children, Anna and Emily.
