= 2022–23 European Rugby Champions Cup pool stage =

European Rugby Champions Cup pool stage

The 2022–23 European Rugby Champions Cup pool stage was the first stage of the 28th season of pan-European professional club rugby union competition, and the ninth under the European Rugby Champions Cup format. Twenty-four clubs from three major domestic and regional leagues competed over four rounds of pool fixtures, with 16 teams progressing to the knockout stages. For the first time, teams from South Africa were involved, after qualifying from the inaugural United Rugby Championship season.

== Pool stage ==
The pool stage draw took place on 21 July 2022. The complete fixture list was announced on 7 October 2022.

Teams in the same pool played two other teams twice, at home and away, in the group stage. The top eight teams in each pool progressed to the round of 16, whilst the teams ranked 9th and 10th progressed to the knockout stages of the 2022–23 European Rugby Challenge Cup.

Teams were awarded group points based on match performances; four points for a win, two points for a draw, one attacking bonus point for scoring four or more tries in a match and one defensive bonus point for losing a match by seven points or fewer.

In the event of a tie between two or more teams, the following tie-breakers were used, as directed by EPCR:

1. Where teams have played each other
  1. The club with the greater number of competition points from only matches involving tied teams.
  2. If equal, the club with the best aggregate points difference from those matches.
  3. If equal, the club that scored the most tries in those matches.
2. Where teams remain tied and/or have not played each other in the competition (i.e. are from different pools)
  1. The club with the best aggregate points difference from the pool stage.
  2. If equal, the club that scored the most tries in the pool stage.
  3. If equal, the club with the fewest players suspended in the pool stage.
  4. If equal, the drawing of lots will determine a club's ranking.

Key to colours
Teams ranked in the top 8 of each pool advance to 2022–23 EPCR Champions Cup round of 16.
Teams ranked 9th and 10th in each pool advance to 2022–23 EPCR Challenge Cup round of 16.
Teams ranked 11th and 12th in each pool are eliminated from 2022 to 2023 European competition.

=== Pool A ===
2022–23 European Rugby Champions Cup Pool A
Team	P	W	D	L	PF	PA	Diff	TF	TA	TB	LB	Pts
(Ireland) Leinster	4	4	0	0	184	34	+150	28	5	4	0	20
(England) Exeter Chiefs	4	3	0	1	139	68	+71	20	8	4	0	16
(South Africa) Sharks	4	3	0	1	119	89	+30	15	11	3	0	15
(England) Saracens	4	3	0	1	120	94	+26	15	11	2	1	15
(Scotland) Edinburgh	4	3	0	1	111	85	+26	12	11	2	1	15
(England) Harlequins	4	2	0	2	113	108	+5	16	13	3	1	12
(South Africa) Bulls	4	2	0	2	102	139	–37	15	19	2	0	10
(England) Gloucester	4	2	0	2	62	140	–78	9	20	1	0	9
(France) Lyon	4	1	0	3	115	125	–10	16	17	3	1	8
(France) Racing 92	4	1	0	3	60	121	–61	7	18	0	1	5
(France) Bordeaux Bègles	4	0	0	4	53	99	–46	5	13	0	2	2
(France) Castres	4	0	0	4	56	132	–76	6	18	0	0	0
Green background (rows 1 to 8) indicates qualification places for the Champions Cup round of 16. Blue background (rows 9 to 10) indicates qualification places for the Challenge Cup round of 16. Starting table — source: European Professional Club Rugby

==== Round 1 ====
10 December 2022
14:00

Racing 92 (France)	10–42	(Ireland) Leinster (1 BP)
Try: Wade 74' c Con: Russell (1/1) 75'; Pen: Russell (1/1) 24'	Report	Try: Porter 3' c Sheehan 32' c Ringrose 37' c Van der Flier (2) 61' m, 79' c E. Byrne 69' c Con: R. Byrne (3/3) 4', 34', 38'; H. Byrne (2/3) 70', 80'

Stade Océane, Le Havre
Attendance: 14,135
Referee: Luke Pearce (England)

10 December 2022
15:00

(1 BP) Sharks (South Africa)	39–31	(England) Harlequins (1 BP)
Try: Mbonambi 11' c Mapimpi (2) 19' c, 26' m Kok 50' c Chamberlain 78' c Con: C. Bosch (4/5) 12', 20', 52', 80'; Pen: C. Bosch (2/3) 16', 62'	Report	Try: Bassett (2) 5' c, 75' m Evans 35' c Esterhuizen (2) 64' c, 68' m Con: Allan (2/2) 7', 36'; Edwards (1/3) 65'

Kings Park Stadium, Durban
Attendance: 12,700
Referee: Tual Trainini (France)

10 December 2022
15:15

(1 BP) Gloucester (England)	22–17	(France) Bordeaux (1 BP)
Try: Varney 24' m Tuisue 62' m Socino 68' m Chapman 76' c Con: Carreras (1/4) 77'	Report	Try: Falatea 2' c Willis 38' m Con: Holmes (1/2) 3'; Pen: Holmes (1/2) 21'

Kingsholm Stadium, Gloucester
Attendance: 9,117
Referee: Craig Evans (Wales)

10 December 2022
19:30

(1 BP) Bulls (South Africa)	42–36	(France) Lyon (2 BP)
Try: Novuka 3' c Van der Linde (2) 7' c, 19' c Carr 23' c Jacobs 41' c C. Smith 66' c Con: M. Steyn (6/6) 4', 8', 20', 24', 42', 67'	Report	Try: Botha (2) 28' c, 48' c Coltman 37' m Dumortier 43' c Godwin 74' c Con: Berdeu (4/5) 29', 44', 49', 75'; Pen: Berdeu (1/1) 61'

Loftus Versfeld Stadium, Pretoria
Attendance: 7,183
Referee: Matthew Carley (England)

10 December 2022
21:00

Castres (France)	12–27	(England) Exeter Chiefs (1 BP)
Pen: Dumora (4/4) 23', 30', 36', 40'	Report	Try: S. Simmonds 19' m Ewers 27' c S. Maunder 44' m Woodburn 59' c Con: J. Simmonds (2/4) 28', 60'; Pen: J. Simmonds (1/1) 68'

Stade Pierre-Fabre, Castres
Attendance: 4,800
Referee: Frank Murphy (Ireland)

11 December 2022
15:15

(1 BP) Saracens (England)	30–26	(Scotland) Edinburgh (1 BP)
Try: Daly 12' c Earl 37' m Lewington 44' m Woolstencroft 67' c Con: Farrell (2/4) 14', 68'; Pen: Farrell (2/3) 57', 61'	Report	Try: De Bruin 5' c Goosen 71' c Con: Boffelli (2/2) 6', 72'; Pen: Boffelli (4/4) 27', 35', 40', 51'

StoneX Stadium, London
Attendance: 8,356
Referee: Nika Amashukeli (Georgia)

==== Round 2 ====
16 December 2022
20:00

(1 BP) Leinster (Ireland)	57–0	(England) Gloucester
Try: Lowe (2) 13' m, 55' c Van der Flier 18' c Kelleher (2) 26' m, 40+2' c J. Ryan 39' c McGrath 46' c Larmour 75' m Doris 80+3' c Con: R. Byrne (5/7) 19', 40', 40+3', 47', 56'; Sexton (1/2) 80+4'	Report

RDS Arena, Dublin
Attendance: 15,469
Referee: Luc Ramos (France)

16 December 2022
21:00

(1 BP) Bordeaux (France)	16–19	(South Africa) Sharks
Try: Giammarioli 7' c Con: Gimbert (1/1) 8'; Pen: Gimbert (2/3) 18', 33'; Holmes (1/1) 68'	Report	Try: Kok 49' c Con: Bosch (1/1) 50'; Pen: Bosch (3/4) 11', 31', 66'; Drop: Bosch (1/1) 14'

Stade Chaban-Delmas, Bordeaux
Attendance: 19,050
Referee: Christophe Ridley (England)

17 December 2022
13:00

(1 BP) Exeter Chiefs (England)	44–14	(South Africa) Bulls
Try: Ewers 11' c Cowan-Dickie (3) 16' m, 31' c, 45' c Slade 36' c Kata 56' m Con: J. Simmonds (4/6) 12', 32', 37', 46'; Pen: J. Simmonds (2/2) 4', 40'	Report	Try: Jacobs 6' c Smit 54' c Con: M. Steyn (2/2) 7', 55'

Sandy Park, Exeter
Attendance: 11,518
Referee: Mathieu Raynal (France)

17 December 2022
13:00

(1 BP) Edinburgh (Scotland)	31–20	(France) Castres
Try: Mata 20' c Penalty try 37'; Savala 48' c Vellacott 66' c Con: Boffelli (3/3) 21', 49', 67'; Pen: Boffelli (1/2) 77'	Report	Try: Colonna 25' m Blanc 30' m Seguret 68' c Con: Botica (1/1) 69'; Pen: Dumora (1/1) 40'

Edinburgh Rugby Stadium, Edinburgh
Attendance: 5,557
Referee: Tom Foley (England)

17 December 2022
16:15

Lyon (France)	20–28	(England) Saracens
Try: Kaabeche (2) 28' m, 33' m Smith 42' c Con: Smith (1/3) 43'; Pen: Smith (1/1) 66'	Report	Try: George 14' m Earl 21' c Maitland 55' c Con: Farrell (2/3) 22', 56'; Pen: Farrell (2/2) 4', 60'; Daly (1/1) 80+1'

Stade de Gerland, Lyon
Attendance: 13,946
Referee: Frank Murphy (Ireland)

18 December 2022
17:30

Harlequins (England)	14–10	(France) Racing 92 (1 BP)
Try: Head 3' c Esterhuizen 49' c Con: Allan (2/2) 4', 50'	Report	Try: Kamikamica 40' c Con: Russell (1/1) 40+1'; Pen: Russell (1/2) 14'

Twickenham Stoop, London
Attendance: 7,444
Referee: Craig Evans (Wales)

==== Round 3 ====
14 January 2023
13:00

Gloucester (England)	14–49	(Ireland) Leinster (1 BP)
Try: Penalty try (2) 26', 65'	Report	Try: Larmour 4' c Alaalatoa 11' c Osborne 28' c Doris 40+6' c Keenan 47' c Van der Flier 72' c Kelleher 79' c Con: R. Byrne (5/5) 5', 12', 29', 40+7', 48'; H. Byrne (2/2) 73', 80'

Kingsholm Stadium, Gloucester
Attendance: 13,164
Referee: Pierre Brousset (France)

14 January 2023
17:15

(1 BP) Sharks (South Africa)	32–3	(France) Bordeaux
Try: Hendrikse (2) 13' m, 23' c Grobler 32' c Potgieter (2) 59' m, 62' m Con: Cronjé (2/5) 25', 33'; Pen: Cronjé (1/1) 7'	Report	Pen: Lucu (1/4) 44'

Kings Park Stadium, Durban
Attendance: 22,784
Referee: Luke Pearce (England)

14 January 2023
19:30

(1 BP) Bulls (South Africa)	39–28	(England) Exeter Chiefs (1 BP)
Try: Louw 15' c Kriel 25' m Vermaak 37' m Simelane (2) 43' c, 71' c Grobbelaar 52' m Con: C. Smith (2/5) 16', 44'; Goosen (1/1) 72'; Pen: C. Smith (1/1) 23'	Report	Try: Hodge 19' c Kata 33' c Kirsten 65' c Jenkins 80' c Con: J. Simmonds (2/2) 20', 34'; Skinner (2/2) 66', 80+1'

Loftus Versfeld Stadium, Pretoria
Attendance: 8,693
Referee: Mathieu Raynal (France) (Note: Mathieu Raynal was the match referee until the 51st minute, when he withdrew due to a hamstring injury. He was replaced for the remainder of the fixture by Thomas Charabas.)

14 January 2023
20:00

(1 BP) Saracens (England)	48–28	(France) Lyon (1 BP)
Try: Lozowski 11' c Daly (3) 17' c, 19' c, 24' m Riccioni 33' m Christie 36' c Earl 80+1' c Con: Goode (5/7) 12', 18', 21', 37', 80+2'; Pen: Goode (1/1) 54'	Report	Try: Maraku 26' c Dumortier (2) 40+4' c, 43' c Botha 57' c Con: Smith (4/4) 28', 40+5', 45', 58'

StoneX Stadium, London
Attendance: 8,436
Referee: Andrea Piardi (Italy)

15 January 2023
14:00

Castres (France)	21–34	(Scotland) Edinburgh (1 BP)
Try: Raisuqe 14' c Seguret 23' c Hounkpatin 39' c Con: Urdapilleta (3/3) 16', 24', 40'	Report	Try: Cherry 10' c Mata 29' c Hutchison 46' c Vellacott 63' c Con: Kinghorn (4/4) 11', 31', 48', 64'; Pen: Kinghorn (2/2) 67', 74'

Stade Pierre-Fabre, Castres
Attendance: 7,812
Referee: Wayne Barnes (England)

15 January 2023
16:15

Racing 92 (France)	30–29	(England) Harlequins (2 BP)
Try: Fickou 5' c Kamikamica 35' c Saili 41' c Con: Russell (3/3) 6', 36', 42'; Pen: Russell (2/2) 55', 70'; Le Garrec (1/1) 78'	Report	Try: Care 45' c Murley (2) 50' c, 65' m Penalty try 76'; Con: Smith (2/3) 46', 52'; Pen: Smith (1/2) 25'

Paris La Défense Arena, Paris
Attendance: 10,383
Referee: Andrew Brace (Ireland)

==== Round 4 ====
20 January 2023
21:00

(1 BP) Lyon (France)	31–7	(South Africa) Bulls
Try: Marchand (2) 4' c, 40+1'; Doussain 36' c Berdeu 56' c Con: Berdeu (4/4) 5', 37', 40+2', 57'; Pen: Berdeu (1/1) 9'	Report	Try: Arendse 41' c Con: Goosen (1/1) 43'

Stade de Gerland, Lyon
Attendance: 13,501
Referee: Wayne Barnes (England)

21 January 2023
13:00

(1 BP) Harlequins (England)	39–29	(South Africa) Sharks (1 BP)
Try: Care 6' c Dombrandt 9' c Murley 18' c Lewies 43' m David 52' c Con: Smith (4/5) 7', 10', 19', 53'; Pen: Smith (2/2) 31', 69'	Report	Try: Am 2' m Hendrikse 27' c Etzebeth 39' c Fassi 78' c Con: Bosch (2/3) 29', 40'; Cronjé (1/1) 79'; Pen: Bosch (1/1) 14'

Twickenham Stoop, London
Attendance: 14,800
Referee: Nika Amashukeli (Georgia)

21 January 2023
15:15

(1 BP) Leinster (Ireland)	36–10	(France) Racing 92
Try: J. O'Brien (2) 15' c, 73' m Keenan (2) 53' m, 69' c Van der Flier 66' m Ringrose 80+3' c Con: R. Byrne (2/4) 16', 70'; H. Byrne (1/2) 80+5'	Report	Try: Tarrit 33' m Wade 48' m

Aviva Stadium, Dublin
Attendance: 43,560
Referee: Matthew Carley (England)

21 January 2023
16:15

Bordeaux (France)	17–26	(England) Gloucester
Try: Gimbert 15' c Boniface 51' c Con: Jalibert (2/2) 16', 52'; Pen: Jalibert (1/2) 2'	Report	Try: McGuigan (2) 24' m, 64' m Tuisue 47' c Con: Barton (1/3) 48'; Pen: Barton (3/3) 54', 57', 61'

Stade Chaban-Delmas, Bordeaux
Attendance: 22,031
Referee: Frank Murphy (Ireland)

21 January 2023
17:30

(1 BP) Exeter Chiefs (England)	40–3	(France) Castres
Try: Slade 25' c Penalty try (2) 36', 72'; S. Simmonds 52'; Nowell 77' m Tshiunza 79' c Con: Slade (2/2) 27', 53'; J. Simmonds (1/2) 80'	Report	Pen: Botica (1/2) 6'

Sandy Park, Exeter
Attendance: 11,823
Referee: Andrew Brace (Ireland)

22 January 2023
17:30

Edinburgh (Scotland)	20–14	(England) Saracens (1 BP)
Try: Cherry 3' c Schoeman 69' c Con: Kinghorn (2/2) 4', 61'; Pen: Kinghorn (2/4) 7', 43'	Report	Try: Earl 74' m Pen: Goode (3/4) 16', 37', 51'

Edinburgh Rugby Stadium, Edinburgh
Attendance: 7,774
Referee: Ludovic Cayre (France)

=== Pool B ===
2022–23 European Rugby Champions Cup Pool B
Team	P	W	D	L	PF	PA	Diff	TF	TA	TB	LB	Pts
(France) La Rochelle	4	4	0	0	120	57	+63	15	7	2	0	18
(France) Toulouse	4	4	0	0	110	53	+57	12	7	1	0	17
(South Africa) Stormers	4	3	0	1	106	68	+38	13	7	3	0	15
(England) Leicester Tigers	4	3	0	1	116	89	+27	11	10	1	1	14
(Wales) Ospreys	4	3	0	1	100	88	+12	12	10	1	1	14
(Ireland) Munster	4	2	0	2	73	67	+6	8	5	0	2	10
(France) Montpellier	4	1	1	2	92	104	–12	13	13	2	1	9
(Ireland) Ulster	4	1	0	3	54	93	–39	7	11	1	2	7
(France) Clermont	4	1	0	3	85	111	–26	8	12	1	1	6
(England) Sale Sharks	4	1	0	3	74	94	–20	11	12	1	0	5
(England) London Irish	4	0	1	3	76	115	–39	10	15	0	1	3
(England) Northampton Saints	4	0	0	4	54	121	–67	5	16	0	1	1
Green background (rows 1 to 8) indicates qualification places for the Champions Cup round of 16. Blue background (rows 9 to 10) indicates qualification places for the Challenge Cup round of 16. Starting table — source: European Professional Club Rugby

==== Round 1 ====
9 December 2022
20:00

(1 BP) London Irish (England)	27–32	(France) Montpellier (1 BP)
Try: González (2) 27' c, 39' c Cinti 31' c Con: Jackson (3/3) 28', 32', 40'; Pen: Jackson (1/1) 10'; Jennings (1/1) 80'	Report	Try: Reinach 40+5' c Darmon (2) 53' c, 66' m Bécognée 62' c Con: Carbonel (3/4) 40+6', 54', 63'; Pen: Carbonel (2/3) 16', 23'

Brentford Community Stadium, London
Attendance: 5,514
Referee: Andrea Piardi (Italy)

10 December 2022
16:15

Clermont (France)	24–14	(South Africa) Stormers
Try: Newsome 48' c Raka 64' m Con: Plisson (1/2) 48'; Pen: Plisson (3/4) 19', 55', 74'	Report	Try: Fourie 28' m Pen: Libbok (2/2) 14', 21'; Blommetjies (1/1) 37'

Stade Marcel-Michelin, Clermont-Ferrand
Attendance: 13,795
Referee: Wayne Barnes (England)

10 December 2022
18:30

(1 BP) La Rochelle (France)	46–12	(England) Northampton Saints
Try: Dulin 2' m Bourgarit 21' c Boudehent 24' c Leyds 40' c Alldritt 43' c Seuteni 48' c Con: Hastoy (5/6) 22', 25', 40+1', 44', 50'; Pen: Hastoy (2/2) 10', 13'	Report	Try: Ramm 70' m Proctor 75' c Con: F. Smith (1/2) 76'

Stade Marcel-Deflandre, La Rochelle
Attendance: 16,000
Referee: Andrew Brace (Ireland)

11 December 2022
13:00

(1 BP) Sale Sharks (England)	39–0	(Ireland) Ulster
Try: T. Curry 16' m D. du Preez 22' c R. du Preez 49' m Curtis 64' c McGuigan 71' c Reed 77' m Con: R. du Preez (3/6) 22', 65', 72'; Pen: R. du Preez (1/1) 28'	Report

AJ Bell Stadium, Salford
Attendance: 6,659
Referee: Mathieu Raynal (France)

11 December 2022
15:15

(1 BP) Munster (Ireland)	13–18	(France) Toulouse
Try: Carbery 10' c Con: Carbery (1/1) 11'; Pen: Carbery (2/3) 39', 75'	Report	Try: Lebel 23' c Tauzin 42' m Con: Ramos (1/2) 24'; Pen: Ramos (2/2) 30', 72'

Thomond Park, Limerick
Attendance: 21,884
Referee: Christophe Ridley (England)

11 December 2022
17:30

(1 BP) Ospreys (Wales)	17–23	(England) Leicester Tigers
Try: Smith 40' c Morris 73' c Con: Walsh (2/2) 40+1', 75'; Pen: Walsh (1/1) 11'	Report	Try: Potter 50' c Watson 58' c Con: Atkinson (2/2) 53', 59'; Pen: Atkinson (3/3) 14', 22', 77'

Swansea.com Stadium, Swansea
Attendance: 6,618
Referee: Ludovic Cayre (France)

==== Round 2 ====
17 December 2022
15:15

Leicester Tigers (England)	23–16	(France) Clermont (1 BP)
Try: Wiese 18' c Montoya 26' c Con: Atkinson (2/2) 19', 28'; Pen: Atkinson (3/3) 37', 52', 70'	Report	Try: Bezy 79' c Con: Belleau (1/1) 80+1'; Pen: Belleau (3/3) 7', 16', 50'

Welford Road Stadium, Leicester
Attendance: 20,435
Referee: Andrew Brace (Ireland)

17 December 2022
17:30

(2 BP) Ulster (Ireland)	29–36	(France) La Rochelle
Try: Henderson 44' c Cooney 60' c Vermeulen 63' m Stewart 74' c Con: Cooney (3/4) 45', 61', 75'; Pen: Cooney (1/1) 80+1'	Report	Try: Dulin 28' c Hastoy 40' c Bougarit 53' c Con: Hastoy (3/3) 30', 40+1', 54'; Pen: Hastoy (5/6) 4', 15', 19', 25', 39'

Aviva Stadium, Dublin (Note: Match was originally due to take place at Ravenhill Stadium, but had to be relocated because of a frozen pitch. As a result, the match was played behind closed doors.)
Attendance: 0
Referee: Luke Pearce (England)

17 December 2022
19:30

(1 BP) Stormers (South Africa)	34–14	(England) London Irish
Try: Engelbrecht 8' c Dayimani 42' c Zas 46' c Pokomela 80+2' c Con: Libbok (4/4) 9', 44', 47', 80+4'; Pen: Libbok (2/2) 40', 61'	Report	Try: Willemse 51' c Joseph 73' c Con: Jackson (2/2) 52', 74'

Cape Town Stadium, Cape Town
Attendance: 9,875
Referee: Pierre Brousset (France)

17 December 2022
21:00

Montpellier (France)	10–21	(Wales) Ospreys
Try: Paenga-Amosa 56' c Con: Carbonel (1/1) 57'; Pen: Carbonel (1/1) 5'	Report	Try: Parry 21' c K. Williams 32' c Morris 62' c Con: O. Williams (1/1) 23', 33', 64'

GGL Stadium, Montpellier
Attendance: 7,300
Referee: Nika Amashukeli (Georgia)

18 December 2022
13:00

Northampton Saints (England)	6–17	(Ireland) Munster
Pen: F. Smith (2/2) 20', 29'	Report	Try: Coombes (2) 14' c, 36' c Con: Carbery (2/2) 15', 37; Pen: Carbery (1/1) 27'

Franklin's Gardens, Northampton
Attendance: 13,220
Referee: Ludovic Cayre (France)

18 December 2022
14:00

(1 BP) Toulouse (France)	45–19	(England) Sale Sharks
Try: Flament 5' c Baille 17' m Dupont (2) 19' c, 47' c Penalty try 41'; Tauzin 60' m Ntamack 76' c Con: Ramos (4/6) 6', 20', 48', 77'	Report	Try: Rodd 2' c Van der Merwe 40' m J. Hill 80+2' c Con: R. du Preez (2/3) 3', 80+4'

Stade Ernest-Wallon, Toulouse
Attendance: 18,739
Referee: Andrea Piardi (Italy)

==== Round 3 ====
13 January 2023
21:00

(1 BP) Clermont (France)	29–44	(England) Leicester Tigers (1 BP)
Try: Delguy 24' c Fourcade 36' c Belleau 42' m Jedrasiak 49' c Con: Belleau (3/4) 25', 38', 50'; Pen: Belleau (1/1) 72'	Report	Try: Scott (2) 3' c, 44' c Simmons 30' c Kelly 34' c Cronin 79' c Con: Pollard (4/4) 4', 31', 35', 45'; Gopperth (1/1) 80'; Pen: Pollard (2/3) 21', 40+4'; Gopperth (1/1) 76'

Stade Marcel-Michelin, Clermont-Ferrand
Attendance: 14,000
Referee: Frank Murphy (Ireland)

14 January 2023
13:00

Sale Sharks (England)	5–27	(France) Toulouse
Try: Van der Merwe 12' m	Report	Try: Meafou 70' c Cramont 72' m Con: Jaminet (1/2) 71'; Pen: Jaminet (5/5) 26', 44', 51', 55', 66'

AJ Bell Stadium, Salford
Attendance: 8,440
Referee: Mike Adamson (Scotland)

14 January 2023
15:15

Munster (Ireland)	27–23	(England) Northampton Saints (1 BP)
Try: Coombes (2) 9' c, 29' c O'Donoghue 20' c Con: Carbery (1/1) 10', 21', 30'; Pen: Carbery (1/1) 2'; Crowley (1/1) 76'	Report	Try: Freeman 45' c Ramm 56' c Con: F. Smith (2/2) 47', 58'; Pen: F. Smith (3/3) 50', 72', 79'

Thomond Park, Limerick
Attendance: 22,295
Referee: Tual Trainini (France)

14 January 2023
18:30

La Rochelle (France)	7–3	(Ireland) Ulster (1 BP)
Try: Sclavi 80+1' c Con: Hastoy (1/1) 80+3'	Report	Pen: Doak (1/2) 65'

Stade Marcel-Deflandre, La Rochelle
Attendance: 16,000
Referee: Nika Amashukeli (Georgia)

14 January 2023
20:00

(1 BP) Ospreys (Wales)	35–29	(France) Montpellier (2 BP)
Try: Cuthbert (2) 23' c, 55' c Tipuric 65' c Morris 78' m Con: C. Evans (3/4) 25', 56', 66'; Pen: C. Evans (3/3) 32', 40+2', 44'	Report	Try: Willemse (2) 27' m, 35' m Chalureau 48' c Darmon 61' c Reinach 72' m Con: Coly (1/2) 49'; Bouthier (1/2) 62'

Swansea.com Stadium, Swansea
Attendance: 4,310
Referee: Karl Dickson (England)

15 January 2023
13:00

London Irish (England)	14–28	(South Africa) Stormers (1 BP)
Try: Penalty try 51'; Fischetti 77' c Con: Jennings (1/1) 78'	Report	Try: Penalty try 14'; Nel 30' c Hartzenberg 38' c Davids 47' c Con: Mngomezulu (3/3) 31', 39', 48'

Brentford Community Stadium, London
Attendance: 8,145
Referee: Ludovic Cayre (France)

==== Round 4 ====
20 January 2023
20:00

(1 BP) Leicester Tigers (England)	26–27	(Wales) Ospreys
Try: Van Poortvliet 14' c Simmons 47' c Con: Pollard (2/2) 15', 49'; Pen: Pollard (4/4) 2', 19', 67', 69'	Report	Try: Lake 10' c Giles 58' c J. Morgan 80+8' c Con: C. Evans (1/1) 11'; O. Williams (2/2) 59', 80+12'; Pen: O. Williams (2/3) 26', 40+2'

Welford Road Stadium, Leicester
Attendance: 19,643
Referee: Tual Trainini (France)

21 January 2023
13:00

Northampton Saints (England)	13–31	(France) La Rochelle (1 BP)
Try: James 53' c Con: F. Smith (1/1) 54'; Pen: F. Smith (2/3) 12', 46'	Report	Try: Botia 26' c Lespiaucq (2) 49' c, 64' m Alldritt 60' c Seuteni 69' m Con: Hastoy (3/5) 27', 50', 61'

Franklin's Gardens, Northampton
Attendance: 12,049
Referee: Andrea Piardi (Italy)

21 January 2023
19:30

(1 BP) Stormers (South Africa)	30–16	(France) Clermont
Try: Roos 47' c Jantjies 53' m D. Du Plessis 55' c Fourie 63' m Con: J. Du Plessis (2/4) 48', 56'; Pen: Wolhuter (2/3) 38', 43'	Report	Try: Delguy 60' c Con: Michet (1/1) 61'; Pen: Belleau (3/3) 14', 26', 45'

Cape Town Stadium, Cape Town
Attendance: 16,716
Referee: Christophe Ridley (England)

21 January 2023
20:00

Ulster (Ireland)	22–11	(England) Sale Sharks
Try: Lyttle 19' m Herring 64' c Vermeulen 76' c Con: Cooney (2/2) 65', 78'; Pen: Doak (1/1) 38'	Report	Try: B. Curry 47' m Pen: R. Du Preez (2/2) 3', 25'

Ravenhill Stadium, Belfast
Attendance: 18,196
Referee: Pierre Brousset (France)

22 January 2023
14:00

Montpellier (France)	21–21	(England) London Irish
Try: Darmon 56' c Giudicelli 67' c Reinach 75' c Con: Carbonel (3/3) 57', 68', 76'	Report	Try: Coleman 5' c González 35' c Creevy 48' c Con: Jackson (3/3) 7', 36', 49'

GGL Stadium, Montpellier
Attendance: 8,327
Referee: Mike Adamson (Scotland)

22 January 2023
16:15

Toulouse (France)	20–16	(Ireland) Munster (1 BP)
Try: Mallía 7' m Pen: Jaminet (5/5) 2', 16', 57', 66', 73'	Report	Try: Hodnett 30' m Beirne 48' m Pen: Carbery (1/1) 35'; Healy (1/1) 60'

Stade Ernest-Wallon, Toulouse
Attendance: 18,739
Referee: Karl Dickson (England)
