= 2022–23 European Rugby Champions Cup =

Rugby union competition

Tournament details
- Countries: England; France; Ireland; Scotland; South Africa; Wales
- Tournament format(s): Modified round-robin and knockout
- Date: 9 December 2022 – 20 May 2023

Tournament statistics
- Teams: 24
- Matches played: 63
- Attendance: 1,028,422 (16,324 per match)
- Highest attendance: 51,711 – Leinster v La Rochelle; 20 May 2023
- Lowest attendance: 4,800 – Castres v Exeter Chiefs; 10 December 2022 (Note: The lowest attendance does not include the match between Ulster and La Rochelle on 17 December 2022, which was played behind closed doors, due to the fixture's forced relocation to a neutral venue.)
- Tries scored: 396 (6.29 per match)
- Top point scorer(s): (France) Antoine Hastoy (La Rochelle); 97 points
- Top try scorer(s): (Ireland) Josh van der Flier (Leinster); 6 tries

Final
- Venue: Aviva Stadium, Dublin
- Attendance: 51,711
- Champions: (France) La Rochelle (2nd title)
- Runners-up: (Ireland) Leinster

The 2022–23 European Rugby Champions Cup was the ninth season of the European Rugby Champions Cup, the annual club rugby union competition run by European Professional Club Rugby (EPCR) for teams from the top five nations in European rugby and South Africa. It was the 28th season of pan-European professional club rugby competition.

Dutch beer brand Heineken continued as the title sponsor of the competition, extending their deal after their previous agreement expired at the end of the 2021–22 season.

This was the first year to feature the top teams from South Africa, following the inaugural United Rugby Championship season.

The tournament commenced in December 2022. The final was held at Aviva Stadium in Dublin, Ireland on 20 May 2023. The match was a repeat of the 2022 final, with Stade Rochelais defeating Leinster for the second consecutive year.

== Teams ==
Twenty-four clubs from the three major European domestic and regional leagues competed in the Champions Cup.

The distribution of teams was:

- England: eight clubs
  - The top eight clubs from Premiership Rugby
- France: eight clubs
  - The top eight clubs from the Top 14
- Ireland, Italy, Scotland, South Africa, Wales: eight clubs
  - The top side in each of the four regional shields from the United Rugby Championship (one Irish, one Welsh, one South African and one either Scottish or Italian), along with the remaining top four ranked clubs regardless of nation, within the league, that didn't win their respective shield. If the club that wins the championship has not qualified by the methods above then that club, the four shield winners and the remaining top three ranked clubs regardless of nation, within the league, that didn't win their respective shield will qualify.

The following teams qualified for the tournament.

Premiership	Top 14	United Rugby Championship			
England	France	Ireland	South Africa	Scotland	Wales
Exeter; Gloucester; Harlequins; Leicester; London Irish; Northampton; Sale; Saracens	Bordeaux-Bègles; Castres; Clermont; La Rochelle; Lyon; Montpellier; Racing 92; Toulouse	Leinster; Munster; Ulster	Bulls; Sharks; Stormers	Edinburgh	Ospreys

=== Team details ===
Below is the list of coaches, captain and stadiums with their method of qualification for each team.

Note: Placing shown in brackets, denotes standing at the end of the regular season for their respective leagues, with their end of season positioning shown through CH for Champions, RU for Runner-up, SF for losing Semi-finalist, and QF for losing Quarter-finalist.

Team	Coach / Director of Rugby	Captain	Stadium	Capacity	Method of qualification
(France) Bordeaux Bègles	(France) Frédéric Charrier (France) Julien Laïrle (Note: Christophe Urios was sacked as head coach of Bordeaux Bègles in November 2022. His assistants, Frédéric Charrier and Julien Laïrle, took over as joint interim head coaches for the rest of the season.)	(France) Mahamadou Diaby	Stade Chaban-Delmas	34,694	Top 14 top 8 (3rd) (SF)
(South Africa) Bulls	(South Africa) Jake White	(South Africa) Marcell Coetzee	Loftus Versfeld Stadium	51,762	URC table rankings (4th) (RU)
(France) Castres	(France) Pierre-Henry Broncan	(France) Mathieu Babillot	Stade Pierre-Fabre	12,500	Top 14 top 8 (1st) (RU)
(France) Clermont	(France) Christophe Urios (Note: Jono Gibbes was sacked as head coach of Clermont in January 2023. His assistants took charge of their final pool stage match, with Christophe Urios appointed to take over as the new head coach as of the end of the pool stage.)	(France) Arthur Iturria	Stade Marcel-Michelin	19,022	Top 14 top 8 (7th)
(Scotland) Edinburgh	(England) Steve Diamond (Note: Mike Blair was the head coach of Edinburgh until March 2023, having taken charge of the club's pool stage fixtures, before he stepped down to transition into the role of attack coach. Steve Diamond was then appointed to take on head coaching duties for the remainder of the season, from the position of lead rugby consultant.)	(Scotland) Grant Gilchrist (Scotland) Jamie Ritchie	Edinburgh Rugby Stadium	7,800	URC Scottish/Italian Shield winner (7th) (QF)
(England) Exeter Chiefs	(England) Rob Baxter	(England) Jack Yeandle	Sandy Park	13,593	Premiership top 8 (7th)
(England) Gloucester	(England) George Skivington	(England) Lewis Ludlow	Kingsholm Stadium	16,115	Premiership top 8 (5th)
(England) Harlequins	(New Zealand) Tabai Matson	(South Africa) Stephan Lewies	Twickenham Stoop	14,800	Premiership top 8 (3rd) (SF)
(France) La Rochelle	(Ireland) Ronan O'Gara	(France) Grégory Alldritt	Stade Marcel-Deflandre	16,000	Top 14 top 8 (5th) (QF)
(England) Leicester Tigers	(England) Richard Wigglesworth (Note: Steve Borthwick was the head coach of Leicester until 19 December 2022, when he departed the club to take up the role of England head coach. Assistant coach Richard Wigglesworth was then appointed as the Tigers interim head coach until the end of the season.)	(South Africa) Hanro Liebenberg	Mattioli Woods Welford Road	25,849	Premiership top 8 (1st) (CH)
(Ireland) Leinster	(Ireland) Leo Cullen	(Ireland) Johnny Sexton	RDS Arena; Aviva Stadium	18,500; 51,700	URC Irish Shield winner (1st) (SF)
(England) London Irish	(Ireland) Declan Kidney	(England) Matt Rogerson	Gtech Community Stadium	17,250	Premiership top 8 (8th)
(France) Lyon	(France) Xavier Garbajosa	(France) Jean-Marc Doussain	Matmut Stadium de Gerland	35,029	2021–22 Challenge Cup Champion
(France) Montpellier	(France) Philippe Saint-André	(France) Yacouba Camara	GGL Stadium	15,697	Top 14 top 8 (2nd) (CH)
(Ireland) Munster	(England) Graham Rowntree	(Ireland) Peter O'Mahony	Thomond Park	25,600	URC table rankings (6th) (QF)
(England) Northampton Saints	(England) Phil Dowson	(England) Lewis Ludlam	cinch Stadium at Franklin's Gardens	15,200	Premiership top 8 (4th) (SF)
(Wales) Ospreys	(England) Toby Booth	(Wales) Justin Tipuric	Swansea.com Stadium	21,088	URC Welsh Shield winner (9th)
(France) Racing 92	(France) Laurent Travers	(France) Henry Chavancy	Paris La Défense Arena	32,000	Top 14 top 8 (6th) (QF)
(England) Sale Sharks	(England) Alex Sanderson	(South Africa) Jono Ross	AJ Bell Stadium	12,000	Premiership top 8 (6th)
(England) Saracens	(Ireland) Mark McCall	(England) Owen Farrell	StoneX Stadium	10,500	Premiership top 8 (2nd) (RU)
(South Africa) Sharks	(South Africa) Sean Everitt	(South Africa) Thomas du Toit	Kings Park Stadium	52,000	URC table rankings (5th) (QF)
(South Africa) Stormers	(South Africa) John Dobson	(South Africa) Ernst van Rhyn	Cape Town Stadium	55,000	URC South African Shield winner (2nd) (CH)
(France) Toulouse	(France) Ugo Mola	(France) Julien Marchand	Stade Ernest-Wallon	19,500	Top 14 top 8 (4th) (SF)
(Ireland) Ulster	(England) Dan McFarland	(Ireland) Iain Henderson	Ravenhill Stadium (Note: Ulster were also forced to play one home game at the Aviva Stadium behind closed doors during the pool stages, due to the pitch at Ravenhill being frozen.)	18,196	URC table rankings (3rd) (SF)

== Seedings and structure ==
For the purposes of the pool draw, the 24 clubs were separated into tiers based on their league finishing position, and clubs from the same league in the same tier were not drawn into the same pool. The number 1 and number 2 ranked clubs from each league are in Tier 1, the number 3 and number 4 ranked clubs are in Tier 2, the number 5 and 6 ranked clubs are in Tier 3, and the number 7 and number 8 ranked clubs are in Tier 4.

In effect, each pool contains one team from each of the three leagues, from each of the four tiers.

Pool play will feature the Tier 1 teams playing the Tier 4 teams in their pool twice, home and away, while the Tier 2 and 3 clubs will follow in a similar manner. However a team will not play the relevant team from its own league i.e. the tier 1 French team will play the tier 4 English and tier 4 URC team in its pool, but will not play the tier 4 French team in its pool. Each team will therefore play four pool games over four match weekends.

As with the previous two seasons, the 24 teams will play four rounds of pool matches. These will take place from 9–18 December 2022 and 13–22 January 2023. Sixteen teams will qualify for the knockout rounds. In a change from the 2021–22 format, the round of 16 contests will take the form of a single match rather than a two-legged tie.

The eight teams from each pool with the best points will qualify for the knockout stage, a single-leg single-elimination bracket of 16 teams. Teams finishing 9th and 10th after pool play will join the Challenge Cup, also at the round of 16 stage (joining twelve qualifiers from the Challenge Cup pool stage), once more in a single-leg single-elimination bracket. Last season's home-and-away two-legged round of 16 has not been continued.

Tier	Rank	Top 14	Premiership	United Rugby Championship
1	1	(France) Montpellier	(England) Leicester Tigers	(South Africa) Stormers
1	2	(France) Castres	(England) Saracens	(South Africa) Bulls
2	3	(France) Bordeaux Bègles	(England) Harlequins	(Ireland) Leinster
2	4	(France) Toulouse	(England) Northampton Saints	(Ireland) Ulster
3	5	(France) La Rochelle	(England) Gloucester	(South Africa) Sharks
3	6	(France) Racing 92	(England) Sale Sharks	(Ireland) Munster
4	7	(France) Clermont	(England) Exeter Chiefs	(Scotland) Edinburgh
4	8	(France) Lyon	(England) London Irish	(Wales) Ospreys

== Pool stage ==
Locations
Locations of European teams of the 2022–23 European Rugby Champions Cup group stage.
Red: Pool A; Blue: Pool B.
Locations of London teams of the 2022–23 European Rugby Champions Cup group stage.
Red: Pool A; Blue: Pool B.
Locations of South African teams of the 2022–23 European Rugby Champions Cup group stage.
Red: Pool A; Blue: Pool B.

Teams were awarded four points for a win, two for a draw, one bonus point for scoring four tries in a game, and one bonus point for losing by less than eight points.

Key to colours
Teams ranked in the top 8 of each pool advance to 2022–23 EPCR Champions Cup round of 16.
Teams ranked 9th and 10th in each pool advance to 2022–23 EPCR Challenge Cup round of 16.
Teams ranked 11th and 12th in each pool are eliminated from 2022 to 2023 European competition.

=== Pool A ===
2022–23 European Rugby Champions Cup Pool A
Team	P	W	D	L	PF	PA	Diff	TF	TA	TB	LB	Pts
(Ireland) Leinster	4	4	0	0	184	34	+150	28	5	4	0	20
(England) Exeter Chiefs	4	3	0	1	139	68	+71	20	8	4	0	16
(South Africa) Sharks	4	3	0	1	119	89	+30	15	11	3	0	15
(England) Saracens	4	3	0	1	120	94	+26	15	11	2	1	15
(Scotland) Edinburgh	4	3	0	1	111	85	+26	12	11	2	1	15
(England) Harlequins	4	2	0	2	113	108	+5	16	13	3	1	12
(South Africa) Bulls	4	2	0	2	102	139	–37	15	19	2	0	10
(England) Gloucester	4	2	0	2	62	140	–78	9	20	1	0	9
(France) Lyon	4	1	0	3	115	125	–10	16	17	3	1	8
(France) Racing 92	4	1	0	3	60	121	–61	7	18	0	1	5
(France) Bordeaux Bègles	4	0	0	4	53	99	–46	5	13	0	2	2
(France) Castres	4	0	0	4	56	132	–76	6	18	0	0	0
Green background (rows 1 to 8) indicates qualification places for the Champions Cup round of 16. Blue background (rows 9 to 10) indicates qualification places for the Challenge Cup round of 16. Starting table — source: European Professional Club Rugby

=== Pool B ===
2022–23 European Rugby Champions Cup Pool B
Team	P	W	D	L	PF	PA	Diff	TF	TA	TB	LB	Pts
(France) La Rochelle	4	4	0	0	120	57	+63	15	7	2	0	18
(France) Toulouse	4	4	0	0	110	53	+57	12	7	1	0	17
(South Africa) Stormers	4	3	0	1	106	68	+38	13	7	3	0	15
(England) Leicester Tigers	4	3	0	1	116	89	+27	11	10	1	1	14
(Wales) Ospreys	4	3	0	1	100	88	+12	12	10	1	1	14
(Ireland) Munster	4	2	0	2	73	67	+6	8	5	0	2	10
(France) Montpellier	4	1	1	2	92	104	–12	13	13	2	1	9
(Ireland) Ulster	4	1	0	3	54	93	–39	7	11	1	2	7
(France) Clermont	4	1	0	3	85	111	–26	8	12	1	1	6
(England) Sale Sharks	4	1	0	3	74	94	–20	11	12	1	0	5
(England) London Irish	4	0	1	3	76	115	–39	10	15	0	1	3
(England) Northampton Saints	4	0	0	4	54	121	–67	5	16	0	1	1
Green background (rows 1 to 8) indicates qualification places for the Champions Cup round of 16. Blue background (rows 9 to 10) indicates qualification places for the Challenge Cup round of 16. Starting table — source: European Professional Club Rugby

== Knockout stage ==
The knockout stage began with the round of 16, starting on 31 March 2023, and concludes with the final on 20 May 2023.

Unlike the previous year, the round of 16 consists of a single leg of matches, consisting of the top eight ranked teams from Pool A and Pool B respectively, with the top four from each receiving home advantage.

Whilst the round of 16 follows a pre-determined format, the quarter-finals include an expected home advantage to the higher ranked team. The semi-finals are to be played at a neutral venue.

=== Bracket ===
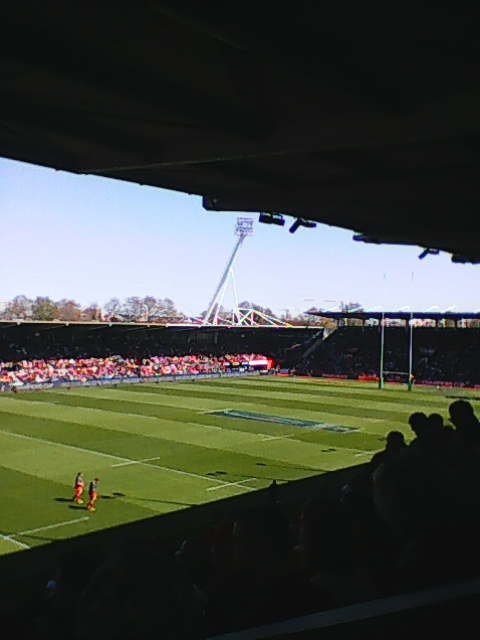
Stade Ernest-Wallon before Toulouse v Sharks

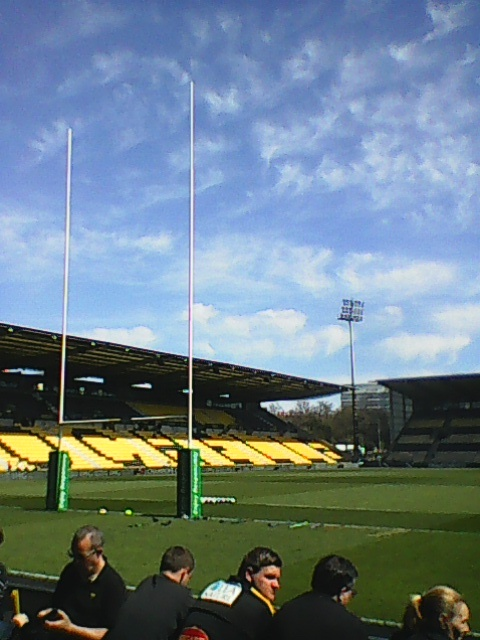
Stade Marcel-Deflandre before La Rochelle v Saracens

Round of 16
A1	(Ireland) Leinster	30
B8	(Ireland) Ulster	15
B4	(England) Leicester	16
A5	(Scotland) Edinburgh	6
B2	(France) Toulouse	33
A7	(South Africa) Bulls	9
A3	(South Africa) Sharks	50
B6	(Ireland) Munster	35
B1	(France) La Rochelle	29
A8	(England) Gloucester	26
A4	(England) Saracens	35
B5	(Wales) Ospreys	20
A2	(England) Exeter (Note: Exeter Chiefs advanced to the quarter-finals after the scores were tied at the end of extra time, due to the try count-back rule, having outscored Montpellier by five tries to four.)	33
B7	(France) Montpellier	33
B3	(South Africa) Stormers	32
A6	(England) Harlequins	28

Quarter-finals
A1	(Ireland) Leinster	55
B4	(England) Leicester	24
B2	(France) Toulouse	54
A3	(South Africa) Sharks	20
B1	(France) La Rochelle	24
A4	(England) Saracens	10
A2	(England) Exeter	42
B3	(South Africa) Stormers	17

Semi-finals
A1	(Ireland) Leinster	41
B2	(France) Toulouse	22
B1	(France) La Rochelle	47
A2	(England) Exeter	28

Final
A1	(Ireland) Leinster	26
B1	(France) La Rochelle	27

=== Round of 16 ===
31 March 2023
20:00

Leicester Tigers (England)	16–6	(Scotland) Edinburgh
Try: Wiese 52' c Con: Pollard (1/1) 53'; Pen: Pollard (3/4) 5', 59', 71'	Report	Pen: Boffelli (2/3) 43', 51'

Mattioli Woods Welford Road, Leicester
Attendance: 12,844
Referee: Mathieu Raynal (France)

1 April 2023
13:30

Sharks (South Africa)	50–35	(Ireland) Munster
Try: Hendrikse 15' c Etzebeth 24' c Mbonambi (2) 44' c, 48' m Kok 53' c Bosch 57' c Mapimpi 63' c Con: Bosch (6/7) 17', 24', 45', 58', 64'; Pen: Bosch (1/2) 4'	Report	Try: S. Daly 5' c Kilcoyne 31' c Barron 60' c Haley 68' c Wycherley 77' c Con: Crowley (5/5) 6', 33', 61', 69', 78'

Kings Park Stadium, Durban
Attendance: 27,987
Referee: Wayne Barnes (England)

1 April 2023
16:00

Stormers (South Africa)	32–28	(England) Harlequins
Try: Fourie (2) 2' c, 31' m Kitshoff 9' m Willemse 50' m Engelbrecht 75' c Con: Libbok (2/5) 3', 77'; Pen: Libbok (1/1) 57'	Report	Try: Dombrandt (2) 4' c, 78' c Esterhuizen 79' c Marchant 80+4' c Con: Smith (4/4) 5', 78', 79', 80+5'

Cape Town Stadium, Cape Town
Attendance: 33,651
Referee: Pierre Brousset (France)

1 April 2023
17:30

Leinster (Ireland)	30–15	(Ireland) Ulster
Try: Baird 19' c Gibson-Park 53' c Porter 62' c Con: R. Byrne (3/3) 20' 54' 63'; Pen: R. Byrne (3/4) 11' 25' 37'	Report	Try: Hume 26' m Herring 57' c Con: Cooney (1/1) 58'; Pen: Doak (1/1) 10'

Aviva Stadium, Dublin
Attendance: 51,700
Referee: Luke Pearce (England)

1 April 2023
18:30

La Rochelle (France)	29–26	(England) Gloucester
Try: Bourgarit 21' c Thomas (2) 25' m, 77' c Kerr-Barlow 45' c Con: Hastoy (3/4) 23', 46', 79'; Pen: Hastoy (1/2) 5'	Report	Try: Harris 12' c Clarke 33' m Rees-Zammit 49' m Con: Twelvetrees (1/3) 13'; Pen: Twelvetrees (3/4) 15', 55', 70'

Stade Marcel-Deflandre, La Rochelle
Attendance: 16,000
Referee: Mike Adamson (Scotland)

2 April 2023
12:30

Exeter Chiefs (England)	33–33 (a.e.t.)	(France) Montpellier
Try: Sio 22' c S. Simmonds 34' c Wyatt 55' m Iosefa-Scott 64' c Yeandle 100' c Con: J. Simmonds (4/5) 23', 35', 65', 100+1'	Report	Try: Langdon 3' c Rattez 7' m Nouchi 76' m Carbonel 93' c Con: Garbisi (2/4) 4', 95'; Pen: Garbisi (2/3) 39', 53', 80+4'

Sandy Park, Exeter
Attendance: 10,582
Referee: Andrew Brace (Ireland)

2 April 2023
15:00

Saracens (England)	35–20	(Wales) Ospreys
Try: Malins (2) 40' c, 56' c Taylor 68' c Woolstencroft 79' m Con: Farrell (3/4) 40+1', 57', 69'; Pen: Farrell (3/4) 9', 34', 63'	Report	Try: Collins 11' c K. Williams 22' c Con: O. Williams (2/2) 12', 24'; Pen: O. Williams (2/2) 45', 52'

StoneX Stadium, London
Attendance: 9,350
Referee: Nika Amashukeli (Georgia)

2 April 2023
16:00

Toulouse (France)	33–9	(South Africa) Bulls
Try: Meafou 50' c Lebel 54' c Flament 64' c Con: Ramos (3/3) 51', 54', 65'; Pen: Ramos (4/4) 7', 11', 17', 33'	Report	Pen: Smith (3/3) 2', 34', 44'

Stadium de Toulouse, Toulouse
Attendance: 32,000
Referee: Matthew Carley (England)

=== Quarter-finals ===
7 April 2023
20:00

Leinster (Ireland)	55–24	(England) Leicester Tigers
Try: Ringrose (2) 2' c, 17' c Gibson-Park 53' c Penalty try 59'; Penny 62' c O'Brien 72' c McKee 78' c Con: R. Byrne (6/6) 2', 17', 54', 63', 73', 80'; Pen: R. Byrne (2/2) 32', 51'	Report	Try: Watson 38' c Cracknell 68' c Potter 75' c Con: Pollard (3/3) 40', 69', 76'; Pen: Pollard (1/1) 7'

Aviva Stadium, Dublin
Attendance: 27,000
Referee: Nika Amashukeli (Georgia)

8 April 2023
16:00

Toulouse (France)	54–20	(South Africa) Sharks
Try: Mallía (2) 37' m, 58' m Ramos (2) 47' c, 72' c Mauvaka 69' c Retière 76' c Ntamack 80' c Con: Ramos (5/7) 48', 70', 73', 77', 80+1'; Pen: Ramos (3/3) 23', 32', 40+1'	Report	Try: Williams 27' c Chamberlain 55' c Con: Bosch (2/2) 28', 56'; Pen: Bosch (2/3) 10', 67'

Stade Ernest-Wallon, Toulouse
Attendance: 18,628
Referee: Karl Dickson (England)

8 April 2023
17:30

Exeter Chiefs (England)	42–17	(South Africa) Stormers
Try: Wyatt 14' c Nowell 22' c Woodburn 30' c S. Simmonds 46' c Yeandle 74' c Cairns 79' c Con: J. Simmonds (6/6) 15', 22' 31', 47', 75', 80'	Report	Try: Willemse 52' m Hartzenberg 61' m Orie 77' c Con: Libbok (1/3) 77'

Sandy Park, Exeter
Attendance: 12,007
Referee: Mathieu Raynal (France)

9 April 2023
16:00

La Rochelle (France)	24–10	(England) Saracens
Try: Kerr-Barlow (2) 33' c, 58' m Con: Hastoy (1/2) 34'; Pen: Hastoy (4/5) 1', 4', 23', 68'	Report	Try: Mawi 65' c Con: Farrell (1/1) 65'; Pen: Farrell (1/1) 21'

Stade Marcel-Deflandre, La Rochelle
Attendance: 16,000
Referee: Andrew Brace (Ireland)

=== Semi-finals ===
Both semi-finals will be played in Europe and the highest-ranked clubs from the pool stage has country advantage. If a South African team had been ranked higher, the game would still have been located in Europe.

29 April 2023
15:00

Leinster (Ireland)	41–22	(France) Toulouse
Try: Conan (2) 16' c, 20' c Sheehan 26' c van der Flier 57' c Jenkins 63' c Con: R. Byrne (5/5) 18', 22', 27', 58', 64'; Pen: R. Byrne (2/2) 4', 12'	Report	Try: Ahki 8' c Meafou 34' c Willis 80'+2 m Con: Ramos (2/3) 9', 34'; Pen: Ramos (1/1) 55'

Aviva Stadium, Dublin
Attendance: 46,823
Referee: Wayne Barnes (England)

30 April 2023
16:00

La Rochelle (France)	47–28	(England) Exeter Chiefs
Try: Rhule (2) 8' c, 43' c Seuteni 22' c Alldritt 31' m Kerr-Barlow (2) 38' c, 67' c Bourgarit 52' c Con: Hastoy (6/7) 10', 23', 39', 44', 54', 68'	Report	Try: S. Simmonds 5' c Iosefa-Scott 58' c Woodburn 69' c Yeandle 74' c Con: J. Simmonds (4/4) 6', 58', 70', 75'

Matmut Atlantique, Bordeaux
Attendance: 41,204
Referee: Jaco Peyper (South Africa)

=== Final ===
20 May 2023
16:45 IST (UTC+01)

Leinster (Ireland)	26–27	(France) La Rochelle
Try: Sheehan (2) 1' c, 11' m O'Brien 5' m Con: Byrne (1/3) 2'; Pen: Byrne (3/3) 23', 30', 46'	Report	Try: Danty 19' c Seuteni 37' c Colombe 71' c Con: Hastoy (3/3) 20', 38', 72'; Pen: Hastoy (2/2) 43', 49'

Aviva Stadium, Dublin
Attendance: 51,711
Referee: Jaco Peyper (South Africa)

== Leading scorers ==
Note: Flags to the left of player names indicate national team as has been defined under World Rugby eligibility rules, or primary nationality for players who have not yet earned international senior caps. Players may hold one or more non-WR nationalities.

=== Most points ===
As of 30 April 2023

Rank	Player	Club	Points
1	(France) Antoine Hastoy	(France) La Rochelle	85
2	(Ireland) Ross Byrne	(Ireland) Leinster	81
3	(France) Thomas Ramos	(France) Toulouse	70
4	(South Africa) Curwin Bosch	(South Africa) Sharks	65
5	(England) Joe Simmonds	(England) Exeter Chiefs	55
6	(South Africa) Handre Pollard	(England) Leicester Tigers	48
7	(England) Owen Farrell	(England) Saracens	40

=== Most tries ===
As of 30 April 2023

Rank	Player	Club	Tries
1	(Ireland) Josh van der Flier	(Ireland) Leinster	6
2	(England) Sam Simmonds	(England) Exeter Chiefs	5
2	(New Zealand) Tawera Kerr-Barlow	(France) La Rochelle	5
4	(France) Pierre Bourgarit	(France) La Rochelle	4
4	(Ireland) Gavin Coombes	(Ireland) Munster	4
4	(England) Elliot Daly	(England) Saracens	4
4	(France) Thomas Darmon	(France) Montpellier	4
4	(England) Ben Earl	(England) Saracens	4
4	(South Africa) André Esterhuizen	(England) Harlequins	4
4	(South Africa) Deon Fourie	(South Africa) Stormers	4
4	(South Africa) Jaden Hendrikse	(South Africa) Sharks	4
4	(Ireland) Garry Ringrose	(Ireland) Leinster	4

== See also ==
- 2022–23 EPCR Challenge Cup
