= 2020–21 European Rugby Champions Cup =

International sports competition

Tournament details
- Countries: England; France; Ireland; Scotland; Wales
- Tournament format(s): Round-robin and knockout
- Date: 12 December 2020 – 22 May 2021

Tournament statistics
- Teams: 24
- Top point scorer(s): (France) Matthieu Jalibert (Bordeaux); 72 points
- Top try scorer(s): (Argentina) Santiago Cordero (Bordeaux) (Japan) Kotaro Matsushima (Clermont) (France) Xavier Mignot (Lyon) (France) Antoine Dupont (Toulouse); 4 tries

Final
- Venue: Twickenham Stadium
- Champions: (France) Toulouse (5th title)
- Runners-up: (France) La Rochelle

The 2020–21 European Rugby Champions Cup (known as the Heineken Champions Cup for sponsorship reasons) was the seventh season of the European Rugby Champions Cup, the annual club rugby union competition run by European Professional Club Rugby (ECPR) for teams from the top six nations in European rugby. It was the 26th season of pan-European professional club rugby competition.

The tournament began on 11 December 2020. The final, originally scheduled at the Stade de Marseille, occurred on 22 May 2021 at Twickenham Stadium.

On 11 January 2021, EPCR suspended the tournament due to further public health restrictions due to the COVID-19 pandemic.

A revised format was announced on 24 February 2021.

== Teams ==
Due to the COVID-19 pandemic delaying the end of the previous tournament twenty-four clubs from the three major European domestic and regional leagues would compete in the Champions Cup in a one-year exceptional basis. EPCR chief Vincent Gaillard confirmed the 24-team tournament in August 2020.

The distribution of teams is:

- England: eight clubs
  - The top eight clubs in Premiership Rugby
- France: eight clubs
  - The top eight clubs in the Top 14
- Ireland, Italy, Scotland, Wales: eight clubs
  - The top four sides (not including the South African sides, which are ineligible for EPCR competitions) in both conferences in the Pro14.

While the 2019–20 Top 14 season was cancelled due to COVID-19, the Premiership and Pro14 resumed in August 2020. However, the Pro14 announced in June 2020 that their European representation would be decided by standings after round 13, the final series of games before the hiatus. The following teams qualified for the tournament via their league performance.

| Premiership | Top 14 | Pro14 | | |
| England | France | Ireland | Scotland | Wales |
|---|---|---|---|---|
| Bath; Bristol Bears; Exeter Chiefs; Gloucester; Harlequins; Northampton Saints; Sale Sharks; Wasps | Bordeaux Bègles; Clermont; La Rochelle; Lyon; Montpellier; Racing 92; Toulon; Toulouse | Connacht; Leinster; Munster; Ulster | Edinburgh; Glasgow Warriors | Dragons; Scarlets |

=== Team details ===
Below is the list of coaches, captain and stadiums with their method of qualification for each team.

Note: Placing shown in brackets, denotes standing at the end of the regular season for their respective leagues, with their end of season positioning shown through CH for Champions, RU for Runner-up and SF for losing Semi-finalist.

| Team | Coach / Director of Rugby | Captain | Stadium | Capacity | Method of qualification |
|---|---|---|---|---|---|
| (England) Bath | (England) Stuart Hooper | (England) Charlie Ewels | The Recreation Ground | 14,509 | Premiership top 8 (4th) (SF) |
| (France) Bordeaux Bègles | (France) Christophe Urios | (France) Jefferson Poirot | Stade Chaban-Delmas | 34,694 | Top 14 top 8 (1st) |
| (England) Bristol Bears | (Samoa) Pat Lam | (New Zealand) Steve Luatua | Ashton Gate | 27,000 | Premiership top 8 (3rd) (SF) |
| (France) Clermont | (France) Franck Azéma | (France) Morgan Parra | Stade Marcel-Michelin | 19,022 | Top 14 top 8 (6th) |
| (Ireland) Connacht | (Australia) Andy Friend | (Australia) Jarrad Butler | Galway Sportsgrounds | 8,129 | Pro14 Conference B (4th) |
| (Wales) Dragons | (England) Dean Ryan | (Wales) Rhodri Williams | Rodney Parade | 8,700 | Pro14 Conference A (5th) |
| (Scotland) Edinburgh | (England) Richard Cockerill | (Scotland) Stuart McInally | Murrayfield | 12,464 (Note: Although Murrayfield's full capacity is 67,144, only the lower section of the East Stand, with a capacity of 12,464, is generally opened for Edinburgh fixtures.) | Pro14 Conference B (1st) (SF) |
| (England) Exeter Chiefs | (England) Rob Baxter | (England) Jack Yeandle | Sandy Park | 13,593 | Premiership top 8 (1st) (CH) |
| (Scotland) Glasgow Warriors | (England) Danny Wilson | (Scotland) Fraser Brown (Scotland) Ryan Wilson | Scotstoun Stadium | 7,351 | Pro14 Conference A (3rd) |
| (England) Gloucester | (England) George Skivington | (England) Lewis Ludlow | Kingsholm Stadium | 16,115 | Premiership top 8 (7th) |
| (England) Harlequins | (England) Paul Gustard (Australia) Billy Millard | (South Africa) Stephan Lewies | Twickenham Stoop | 14,800 | Premiership top 8 (6th) |
| (France) La Rochelle | (New Zealand) Jono Gibbes | (New Zealand) Victor Vito | Stade Marcel-Deflandre | 16,000 | Top 14 top 8 (5th) |
| (Ireland) Leinster | (Ireland) Leo Cullen | (Ireland) Johnny Sexton | RDS Arena; Aviva Stadium | 18,500; 51,700 | Pro14 Conference A (1st) (CH) |
| (France) Lyon | (France) Pierre Mignoni | (France) Baptiste Couilloud (France) Félix Lambey | Matmut Stadium de Gerland | 25,000 | Top 14 top 8 (2nd) |
| (France) Montpellier | (France) Xavier Garbajosa | (France) Fulgence Ouedraogo | Altrad Stadium | 15,697 | Top 14 top 8 (8th) |
| (Ireland) Munster | (South Africa) Johann van Graan | (Ireland) Peter O'Mahony | Thomond Park | 25,600 | Pro14 Conference B (2nd) (SF) |
| (England) Northampton Saints | (New Zealand) Chris Boyd | (England) Lewis Ludlam (England) Alex Waller | Franklin's Gardens | 15,200 | Premiership top 8 (8th) |
| (France) Racing 92 | (France) Laurent Travers | (France) Henry Chavancy | Paris La Défense Arena | 30,681 | Top 14 top 8 (3rd) |
| (England) Sale Sharks | (England) Paul Deacon | (South Africa) Jono Ross | AJ Bell Stadium | 12,000 | Premiership top 8 (5th) |
| (Wales) Scarlets | (New Zealand) Glenn Delaney | (Wales) Ken Owens | Parc y Scarlets | 14,870 | Pro14 Conference B (3rd) |
| (France) Toulon | (France) Patrice Collazo | (France) Raphaël Lakafia | Stade Mayol | 18,200 | Top 14 top 8 (4th) |
| (France) Toulouse | (France) Ugo Mola | (France) Julien Marchand | Stade Ernest-Wallon | 19,500 | Top 14 top 8 (7th) |
| (Ireland) Ulster | (England) Dan McFarland | (Ireland) Iain Henderson | Ravenhill Stadium | 18,196 | Pro14 Conference A (2nd) (RU) |
| (England) Wasps | (England) Lee Blackett | (England) Dan Robson (Wales) Thomas Young | Ricoh Arena | 32,609 | Premiership top 8 (2nd) (RU) |

== Seeding ==
The twenty four teams would be broken down into two pools of twelve. Originally, four rounds of inter-pool play was to be followed by a knockout stage, featuring two-legged quarterfinals, and single leg semi-finals and final (to be held in Marseille on 22 May 2021). However at suspension of the tournament in January 2021, only two rounds of the pool stage were completed and the revised format would introduce a round of 16 following these.

For the purposes of the pool draw, the clubs would be separated into tiers based on their league finishing position, and clubs from the same league in the same tier would not be drawn into the same pool. The number 1 and number 2 ranked clubs from each league will be in Tier 1, the number 3 and number 4 ranked clubs would be in Tier 2, the number 5 and 6 ranked clubs would be in Tier 3, and the number 7 and number 8 ranked clubs would be Tier 4.

The pool stage would feature the Tier 1 teams playing the Tier 4 teams in their pool (that are not from the same league) twice in a home or away manner, while the Tier 2 and 3 clubs would follow in a similar manner.

When the revised format was announced, the top eight teams from each pool would qualify for the knockout stage of the Champions Cup and teams finishing between 9th and 12th in each pool would join the Challenge Cup at the Round of 16 stage, joining eight qualifiers from the Challenge Cup pool stage. Due to the suspension in January 2021, only six weekends of play would be provided for, three less than in previous seasons.

| Tier | Rank | Top 14 | Premiership | Pro14 |
|---|---|---|---|---|
| 1 | 1 | (France) Bordeaux Bègles | (England) Exeter Chiefs | (Ireland) Leinster |
| 1 | 2 | (France) Lyon | (England) Wasps | (Ireland) Ulster |
| 2 | 3 | (France) Racing 92 | (England) Bristol Bears | (Ireland) Munster |
| 2 | 4 | (France) Toulon | (England) Bath | (Scotland) Edinburgh |
| 3 | 5 | (France) La Rochelle | (England) Sale Sharks | (Wales) Scarlets |
| 3 | 6 | (France) Clermont | (England) Harlequins | (Ireland) Connacht |
| 4 | 7 | (France) Toulouse | (England) Gloucester | (Scotland) Glasgow Warriors |
| 4 | 8 | (France) Montpellier | (England) Northampton Saints | (Wales) Dragons |

== Pool stage ==
Locations
Locations of teams of the 2020–21 European Rugby Champions Cup pool stage.
Green: Pool A; Red: Pool B.

The draw took place on 28 October 2020 at the Maison du Sport International in Lausanne, Switzerland. The 24 teams were drawn into the two pools as follows, this also shows their opponents. Fixtures were announced on 13 November 2020.

Key to colours
| Top 8 in each pool, advance to round of 16. |
| Teams ranked 9th–12th in each pool advance to 2020–21 European Rugby Challenge Cup round of 16 |

=== Pool A ===
| Team | P | W | D | L | PF | PA | Diff | TF | TA | TB | LB | Pts |
|---|---|---|---|---|---|---|---|---|---|---|---|---|
| (Ireland) Leinster | 2 | 2 | 0 | 0 | 70 | 33 | +37 | 9 | 4 | 2 | 0 | 10 |
| (England) Wasps | 2 | 2 | 0 | 0 | 57 | 22 | +35 | 9 | 3 | 2 | 0 | 10 |
| (France) Bordeaux Bègles | 2 | 2 | 0 | 0 | 63 | 20 | +43 | 8 | 1 | 1 | 0 | 9 |
| (France) La Rochelle | 2 | 2 | 0 | 0 | 41 | 8 | +33 | 6 | 1 | 1 | 0 | 9 |
| (Wales) Scarlets | 2 | 2 | 0 | 0 | 51 | 19 | +32 | 6 | 2 | 1 | 0 | 9 |
| (Scotland) Edinburgh | 2 | 1 | 0 | 1 | 24 | 28 | -4 | 2 | 4 | 0 | 1 | 5 |
| (France) Toulon | 2 | 1 | 0 | 1 | 26 | 42 | -16 | 2 | 6 | 0 | 0 | 4 |
| (England) Sale Sharks | 2 | 0 | 0 | 2 | 29 | 42 | -13 | 4 | 3 | 0 | 1 | 1 |
| (England) Northampton Saints | 2 | 0 | 0 | 2 | 31 | 51 | -20 | 3 | 5 | 0 | 1 | 1 |
| (England) Bath | 2 | 0 | 0 | 2 | 19 | 51 | -32 | 2 | 6 | 0 | 1 | 1 |
| (France) Montpellier | 2 | 0 | 0 | 2 | 28 | 68 | -40 | 3 | 10 | 0 | 0 | 0 |
| (Wales) Dragons | 2 | 0 | 0 | 2 | 16 | 71 | -55 | 2 | 11 | 0 | 0 | 0 |

=== Pool B ===
| Team | P | W | D | L | PF | PA | Diff | TF | TA | TB | LB | Pts |
|---|---|---|---|---|---|---|---|---|---|---|---|---|
| (France) Lyon | 2 | 2 | 0 | 0 | 83 | 10 | +73 | 12 | 1 | 1 | 0 | 10 |
| (France) Racing 92 | 2 | 2 | 0 | 0 | 75 | 29 | +46 | 11 | 4 | 2 | 0 | 10 |
| (France) Toulouse | 2 | 2 | 0 | 0 | 57 | 22 | +35 | 8 | 3 | 2 | 0 | 10 |
| (Ireland) Munster | 2 | 2 | 0 | 0 | 60 | 38 | +22 | 5 | 5 | 0 | 0 | 8 |
| (France) Clermont | 2 | 1 | 0 | 1 | 82 | 77 | +5 | 11 | 8 | 2 | 0 | 6 |
| (England) Bristol Bears | 2 | 1 | 0 | 1 | 65 | 69 | -4 | 9 | 9 | 2 | 0 | 6 |
| (England) Exeter Chiefs | 2 | 1 | 0 | 1 | 42 | 28 | +14 | 6 | 4 | 1 | 0 | 5 |
| (England) Gloucester | 2 | 1 | 0 | 1 | 48 | 89 | -41 | 6 | 12 | 1 | 0 | 5 |
| (Ireland) Ulster | 2 | 0 | 0 | 2 | 56 | 67 | -11 | 7 | 9 | 1 | 2 | 3 |
| (Ireland) Connacht | 2 | 0 | 0 | 2 | 40 | 53 | -13 | 5 | 8 | 0 | 1 | 1 |
| (England) Harlequins | 2 | 0 | 0 | 2 | 14 | 70 | -56 | 2 | 9 | 0 | 0 | 0 |
| (Scotland) Glasgow Warriors | 2 | 0 | 0 | 2 | 0 | 70 | -70 | 0 | 10 | 0 | 0 | 0 |

== Knockout stage ==
The knockout stage will commence with a round of 16 consisting of the top 8 ranked teams from each pool. Due to the truncation of the pool stage, a draw will be used to determine matches in both round of 16 and quarter-finals but no team will face a team from the same league in the round of 16. Teams which won both their matches and were not awarded points due to COVID cancellations would be guaranteed home advantage. Therefore, Bordeaux Bègles, Leinster, Munster, Racing 92 and Wasps will receive home advantage.

The draw for the round of 16 and quarter-finals took place on 9 March 2021 in Lausanne, Switzerland.

=== Bracket ===
Round of 16
(England) Wasps | 25
(France) Clermont | 27
(Ireland) Munster | 33
(France) Toulouse | 40
(France) Bordeaux Bègles | 36
(England) Bristol Bears | 17
(France) Racing 92 | 56
(Scotland) Edinburgh | 3
(England) Gloucester | 16
(France) La Rochelle | 27
(Wales) Scarlets | 14
(England) Sale Sharks | 57
(England) Exeter Chiefs | 47
(France) Lyon | 25
(Ireland) Leinster | Bye
(France) ~~Toulon~~

Quarter-finals
(France) Clermont | 12
(France) Toulouse | 21
(France) Bordeaux Bègles | 24
(France) Racing 92 | 21
(France) La Rochelle | 45
(England) Sale Sharks | 21
(England) Exeter Chiefs | 22
(Ireland) Leinster | 34

Semi-finals
(France) Toulouse | 21
(France) Bordeaux Bègles | 9
(France) La Rochelle | 32
(Ireland) Leinster | 23

#Final
(France) Toulouse | 22
(France) La Rochelle | 17

=== Round of 16 ===
Fixtures were announced on 16 March 2021.

2 April 2021
17:30 IST

| Leinster (Ireland) | Cancelled (Note: Toulon had one non-travelling player resulting positive to coronavirus in the week before the game, and therefore Leinster progressed to quarter-finals.) | (France) Toulon |

RDS Arena
Referee: Matthew Carley (England)

2 April 2021
20:00 BST

| Gloucester (England) | 16–27 | (France) La Rochelle |
| Try: Ackermann 31' c Con: Barton (1/1) 32'; Pen: Barton (3/3) 2', 12', 59' | Report | Try: Leyds 8' m Retière 22' c Con: West (1/2) 23'; Pen: West (3/3) 17', 48', 55'; Plisson (2/2) 65', 71' |

Kingsholm
Attendance: 0
Referee: Andrew Brace (Ireland)

3 April 2021
12:30 BST

| Wasps (England) | 25–27 | (France) Clermont |
| Try: Odogwu 5' c Bassett 23' c Harris 54' m Con: Umaga (2/3) 5', 24'; Pen: Umaga (2/2) 39', 40+2' | Report | Try: Bézy 11' c Ravai 17' c Matsushima 80+2' c Con: Nanai-Williams (1/1) 12'; Lopez (2/2) 20', 80+3'; Pen: Lopez (2/3) 52', 67' |

Ricoh Arena
Attendance: 0
Referee: Frank Murphy (Ireland)

3 April 2021
15:00 IST

| Munster (Ireland) | 33–40 | (France) Toulouse |
| Try: Earls (2) 24' m, 27' m Coombes (2) 50' c, 80' c Con: Carbery (1/3) 51'; Casey (1/1) 80'; Pen: Carbery (2/2) 14', 40+1'; Hanrahan (1/1) 65' | Report | Try: Lebel 42' c Marchand 54' c Dupont (2) 67' c, 76' c Con: Ntamack (4/4) 43', 55', 68', 77'; Pen: Ntamack (4/6) 3', 16', 30', 75' |

Thomond Park
Attendance: 0
Referee: Wayne Barnes (England)

3 April 2021
17:30 BST

| Exeter Chiefs (England) | 47–25 | (France) Lyon |
| Try: Hill (2) 14' m, 25' c O'Flaherty 28' c Devoto 38' c Ewers 50' c Penalty try 62'; Woodburn 75' c Con: J. Simmonds (4/5) 27', 30', 39', 51'; Skinner (1/1) 77' | Report | Try: Couilloud 5' c Mignot 8' c Cretin 79' m Con: Wisniewski (2/3) 6', 9'; Pen: Wisniewski (2/2) 17', 34' |

Sandy Park
Attendance: 0
Referee: Ben Whitehouse (Wales)

4 April 2021
13:30 CET

| Racing 92 (France) | 56–3 | (Scotland) Edinburgh |
| Try: Chat 25' c Machenaud 33' c Joseph 62' c Gogichashvili 66' c Thomas (2) 69' c, 74' m Trinh-Duc 79' c Con: Machenaud (2/2) 26', 34'; Iribaren (4/5) 63', 67', 70', 80'; Pen: Machenaud (2/3) 7', 31'; Gibert (1/2) 56' | Report | Pen: Kinghorn (1/1) 13' |

Paris La Défense Arena
Attendance: 0
Referee: Luke Pearce (England)

4 April 2021
16:00 CET

| Bordeaux Bègles (France) | 36–17 | (England) Bristol Bears |
| Try: Jalibert 44' c Dweba 70' c Ducuing 79' c Con: Jalibert (1/1) 45'; Lucu (2/2) 71', 80'; Pen: Jalibert (5/6) 9', 15', 21', 34', 40' | Report | Try: Purdy 6' m Pen: Sheedy (4/4) 13', 17', 26', 55' |

Stade Chaban-Delmas
Attendance: 0
Referee: Mike Adamson (Scotland)

4 April 2021
17:30 BST

| Scarlets (Wales) | 14–57 | (England) Sale Sharks |
| Try: Owens 46' c J. Morgan 76' c Con: Halfpenny (2/2) 47', 76' | Report | Try: Van der Merwe (2) 16' c, 29' c MacGinty 41' c Yarde 51' c Beaumont 62' c Quirke 77' c Con: MacGinty (6/6) 17', 31', 42', 53', 63', 78'; Pen: MacGinty (5/5) 2', 25', 36', 68', 70' |

Parc y Scarlets
Attendance: 0
Referee: Mathieu Raynal (France)

=== Quarter-finals ===
10 April 2021
16:00 CET

| La Rochelle (France) | 45–21 | (England) Sale Sharks |
| Try: Alldritt 28' m Leyds 36' c Rhule (2) 41' c, 51' m Doumayrou (2) 61' c, 69' m Con: West (3/6) 37', 42', 62'; Pen: West (3/4) 11', 21', 65' | Report | Try: S. James 40+1' c McGuigan 76' m Con: MacGinty (1/2) 40+4'; Pen: MacGinty (3/4) 9', 26', 33' |

Stade Marcel-Deflandre
Attendance: 0
Referee: Andrew Brace (Ireland)

10 April 2021
17:30 BST

| Exeter Chiefs (England) | 22–34 | (Ireland) Leinster |
| Try: O'Flaherty (2) 2' c, 7' c Ewers 42' m Con: J. Simmonds (2/3) 3', 9'; Pen: J. Simmonds (1/1) 47' | Report | Try: Lowe 17' c Larmour (2) 28' c, 56' m Con: Sexton (1/1) 18'; R. Byrne (1/2) 29'; Pen: R. Byrne (5/5) 32', 40', 50', 65', 79' |

Sandy Park
Attendance: 0
Referee: Mathieu Raynal (France)

11 April 2021
13:30 CET

| Bordeaux Bègles (France) | 24–21 | (France) Racing 92 |
| Pen: Jalibert (8/9) 5', 16', 22', 48', 59', 61', 74', 80+2' | Report | Pen: Machenaud (4/5) 2', 25', 44', 53'; Iribaren (2/2) 67', 79'; Drop: Gibert 14' |

Stade Chaban-Delmas
Attendance: 0
Referee: Matthew Carley (England)

11 April 2021
16:00 CET

| Clermont (France) | 12–21 | (France) Toulouse |
| Pen: Parra (4/5) 24', 28', 41', 57' | Report | Pen: Ntamack (7/9) 32', 39', 43', 48', 55', 61', 64', 72' |

Stade Marcel-Michelin
Attendance: 0
Referee: Luke Pearce (England)

=== Semi-finals ===
The draw for the semi-finals took place on 11 April 2021 at BT Sport's studios in London. As a result of the pandemic all matches will be held at the designated club's home ground.

1 May 2021
16:00 CET

| Toulouse (France) | 21–9 | (France) Bordeaux Bègles |
| Try: Lebel 5' m Dupont 71' c Con: Ntamack (1/2) 72'; Pen: Ntamack (3/3) 38', 44', 64' | Report | Pen: Jalibert (3/4) 3', 20', 68' |

Stade Ernest-Wallon
Referee: Wayne Barnes (England)

2 May 2021
16:00 CET

| La Rochelle (France) | 32–23 | (Ireland) Leinster |
| Try: Alldritt 65' c Skelton 73' c Con: West (2/2) 67', 75'; Pen: West (5/6) 15', 32', 36', 46', 56'; Drop: West 18' | Report | Try: Furlong 8' c Byrne 77' c Con: Byrne (2/2) 8', 77'; Pen: Byrne (3/4) 20', 26', 52' |

Stade Marcel-Deflandre
Referee: Matthew Carley (England)

=== Final ===
22 May 2021
16:45

| La Rochelle (France) | 17–22 | (France) Toulouse |
| Try: Kerr-Barlow 72' m Pen: West (4/6) 7', 26', 32', 40' | Report | Try: Cruz Mallía 59' c Con: Ntamack (1/1) 60'; Pen: Ntamack (5/5) 4', 10', 37', 46', 69' |

Twickenham Stadium
Attendance: 10,000 (Note: Capacity limited to 10,000 due to national restrictions surrounding the COVID-19 pandemic.)
Referee: Luke Pearce (England)

== See also ==
- 2020–21 European Rugby Challenge Cup
