= 2022–23 EPCR Challenge Cup =

Rugby union competition

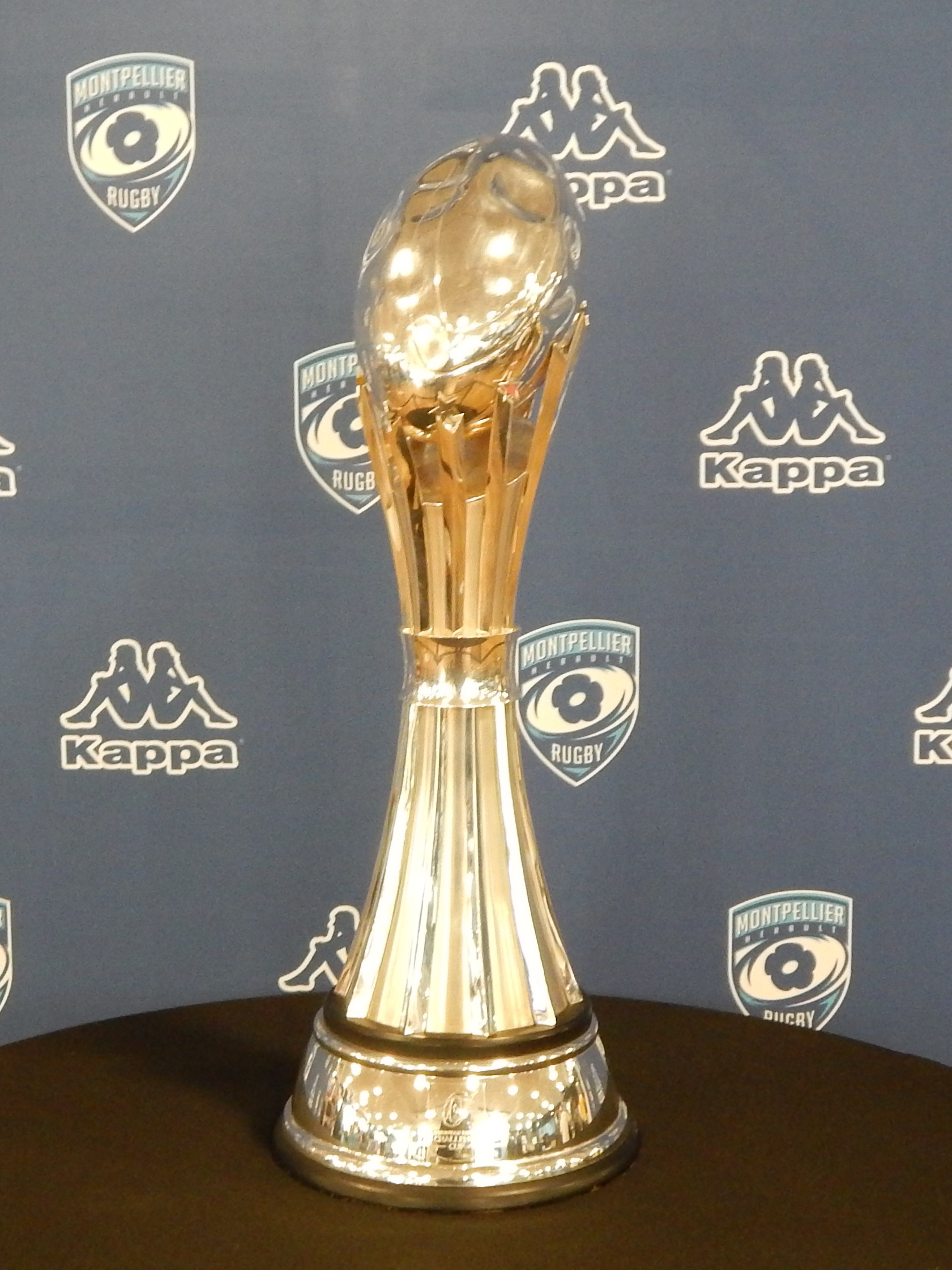
- The EPCR Challenge Cup

Tournament details
- Countries: England; France; Ireland; Italy; Scotland; South Africa; Wales
- Tournament format(s): Round-robin and knockout
- Date: 9 December 2022 – 19 May 2023

Tournament statistics
- Teams: 18
- Matches played: 51
- Attendance: 314,320 (6,163 per match)
- Highest attendance: 31,514 - Glasgow Warriors v Toulon; 19 May 2023
- Lowest attendance: 200 - Cheetahs v Scarlets; 17 December 2022; 200 - Cheetahs v Pau; 22 January 2023 (Note: Games when not effected by reduced crowd due to relocation.)
- Tries scored: 329 (6.45 per match)
- Top point scorer(s): (Wales) Sam Costelow (Scarlets); 62 points
- Top try scorer(s): (Scotland) Johnny Matthews (Glasgow Warriors) (Fiji) Jiuta Wainiqolo (Toulon); 7 tries

Final
- Venue: Aviva Stadium, Dublin
- Champions: (France) Toulon (1st title)
- Runners-up: (Scotland) Glasgow Warriors

The 2022–23 EPCR Challenge Cup was the 9th edition of the EPCR Challenge Cup, an annual second-tier rugby union competition for professional clubs. Including the predecessor competition, the original European Challenge Cup, this is the 27th edition of European club rugby's second-tier competition.

The tournament commenced in December 2022, and concluded with the final on 19 May 2023 at Aviva Stadium, Dublin, Ireland, which was contested between Glasgow Warriors (their first European final) and Toulon who made their fourth appearance in a European final.

This was the first year that teams from South Africa could qualify, following the inaugural United Rugby Championship season, with Johannesburg-based Lions making their inaugural appearance in European club rugby. In addition, another South African team, the Bloemfontein-based Cheetahs franchise, formerly of the URC predecessor competition the Pro14, had been invited to enter, having been excluded from European competition during their Pro14 tenure.

== Teams ==
Seventeen teams qualified for the 2022–23 EPCR Challenge Cup from Premiership Rugby, the Top 14 and the United Rugby Championship as a direct result of their domestic league performance having not qualified for the Heineken Champions Cup. Plus one invited sides making 18 teams.

The distribution of teams were:

- England: three teams
  - Remaining teams in the Premiership that do not qualify for the 2022–23 European Rugby Champions Cup. Worcester Warriors and Wasps had previously qualified but were both suspended after entering administration.
- France: six teams
  - Teams taking part in the 2022–23 Top 14 season that did not qualify for the Champions Cup
- Ireland, Italy, Scotland, Wales, South Africa: nine teams
  - The bottom seven teams in the United Rugby Championship and the Glasgow Warriors as the Welsh shield winners (the Ospreys) were not in the top 8 teams in the URC.
  - Cheetahs (invited to participate)

| Round | Premiership | Top 14 | United Rugby Championship | | | | | Invited |
| | England | France | Ireland | Italy | Scotland | Wales | South Africa | |
|---|---|---|---|---|---|---|---|---|
| Pool stage | Bath; Bristol Bears; Newcastle Falcons | Bayonne; Brive; Pau; Perpignan; Stade Français; Toulon | Connacht | Benetton; Zebre Parma | Glasgow Warriors | Cardiff; Dragons; Scarlets | Lions | Cheetahs |

=== Team details ===
| Team | Coach / Director of Rugby | Captain | Stadium | Capacity | Method of qualification |
Entering at Pool stage
| (England) Bath | (South Africa) Johann van Graan | (England) Ben Spencer | Recreation Ground (Note: Bath were also forced to play one home game at Kingsholm, Gloucester in round 3 due to waterlogged pitch at the Rec.) | 14,509 | Premiership 9th–13th (13th) |
| (France) Bayonne | (France) Grégory Patat | (France) Antoine Battut | Stade Jean-Dauger | 18,069 | Pro D2 Champions |
| (Italy) Benetton | (Italy) Marco Bortolami | (South Africa) Dewaldt Duvenage (Italy) Michele Lamaro | Stadio Comunale di Monigo | 6,700 | URC bottom 8 (13th) |
| (England) Bristol Bears | (Samoa) Pat Lam | (New Zealand) Steve Luatua | Ashton Gate Stadium | 27,000 | Premiership 9th–13th (10th) |
| (France) Brive | (France) Patrice Collazo | (Algeria) Saïd Hireche | Stade Amédée-Domenech | 13,979 | Top 14 bottom 6 (12th) |
| (Wales) Cardiff | (Wales) Dai Young | (Wales) Josh Turnbull | Cardiff Arms Park | 12,125 | URC bottom 8 (14th) |
| (South Africa) Cheetahs | (South Africa) Hawies Fourie | (South Africa) Victor Sekekete | Free State Stadium | 46,000 | Invited team |
| (Ireland) Connacht | (Australia) Andy Friend | (Ireland) Jack Carty | Galway Sportsgrounds | 8,129 | URC bottom 8 (11th) |
| (Wales) Dragons | (Wales) Dai Flanagan (Note: Flanagan took over coaching duties at the region, replacing Dean Ryan ahead of the Challenge Cup.) | (Wales) Harrison Keddie (Wales) Will Rowlands | Rodney Parade (Note: Dragons were also forced to play their round 4 game at the CCB Centre for Sporting Excellence due to a frozen pitch at Rodney Parade.) | 8,700 | URC bottom 8 (15th) |
| (Scotland) Glasgow Warriors | (South Africa) Franco Smith | (Scotland) Kyle Steyn | Scotstoun Stadium (Note: Glasgow were also forced to play one home game at Murrayfield Stadium in round 2 due to an unplayable pitch at Scotstoun.) | 7,351 | URC bottom 8 (8th) |
| (South Africa) Lions | (South Africa) Ivan van Rooyen | (South Africa) Reinhard Nothnagel | Ellis Park Stadium | 62,567 | URC bottom 8 (12th) |
| (England) Newcastle Falcons | (England) Dave Walder | (England) Will Welch | Kingston Park | 10,200 | Premiership 9th–13th (12th) |
| (France) Pau | (France) Sébastien Piqueronies | (France) Lucas Rey | Stade du Hameau | 18,324 | Top 14 bottom 6 (10th) |
| (France) Perpignan | (France) Patrick Arlettaz | (France) Mathieu Acebes | Stade Aimé Giral | 14,593 | Top 14 bottom 6 (13th) |
| (Wales) Scarlets | (Wales) Dwayne Peel | (Wales) Jonathan Davies | Parc y Scarlets | 14,870 | URC bottom 8 (10th) |
| (France) Stade Français Paris | (Argentina) Gonzalo Quesada | (France) Romain Briatte | Stade Jean-Bouin | 20,000 | Top 14 bottom 6 (11th) |
| (France) Toulon | (France) Pierre Mignoni | (France) Charles Ollivon | Stade Mayol | 18,200 | Top 14 bottom 6 (8th) |
| (Italy) Zebre | (Italy) Fabio Roselli | (Italy) Dave Sisi | Stadio Sergio Lanfranchi | 5,000 | URC bottom 8 (16th) |
Entering at Knockout Stage (transferred from Champions Cup)
| (France) Clermont | (France) Christophe Urios (Note: Jono Gibbes was sacked as head coach of Clermont in January 2023. His assistants took charge of their final pool stage match, with Christophe Urios appointed to take over as the new head coach as of the end of the pool stage.) | (France) Arthur Iturria | Stade Marcel-Michelin | 19,022 | Champions Cup Pool B 9th–10th (9th) |
| (France) Lyon | (France) Xavier Garbajosa | (France) Jean-Marc Doussain | Matmut Stadium de Gerland | 35,029 | Champions Cup Pool A 9th–10th (9th) |
| (France) Racing 92 | (France) Laurent Travers | (France) Henry Chavancy | Paris La Défense Arena | 32,000 | Champions Cup Pool A 9th–10th (10th) |
| (England) Sale Sharks | (England) Alex Sanderson | (South Africa) Jono Ross | AJ Bell Stadium | 12,000 | Champions Cup Pool B 9th–10th (10th) |

== Pool stage ==
Locations
Locations of European teams of the 2022–23 EPCR Challenge Cup.
Green: Pool A; Purple: Pool B; White: Entered competition in knockout stage.
Locations of South African teams of the 2022–23 EPCR Challenge Cup. Purple: Pool B.

Teams were awarded four points for a win, two for a draw, one for scoring four tries in a game, and one for losing by less than eight points.

Key to colours
| Top 6 in each pool, advance to round of 16. |

=== Pool A ===
Pool A
| Team | P | W | D | L | PF | PA | Diff | TF | TA | TB | LB | Pts |
|---|---|---|---|---|---|---|---|---|---|---|---|---|
| (France) Toulon | 4 | 4 | 0 | 0 | 102 | 56 | +46 | 14 | 8 | 3 | 0 | 19 |
| (Scotland) Glasgow Warriors | 4 | 3 | 1 | 0 | 107 | 82 | +25 | 16 | 10 | 2 | 0 | 16 |
| (Wales) Cardiff | 4 | 3 | 0 | 1 | 154 | 57 | +97 | 23 | 7 | 3 | 0 | 15 |
| (England) Bristol Bears | 4 | 4 | 0 | 0 | 121 | 54 | +67 | 19 | 8 | 3 | 0 | 14* |
| (Ireland) Connacht | 4 | 3 | 0 | 1 | 135 | 72 | +63 | 19 | 10 | 2 | 0 | 14 |
| (France) Brive | 4 | 1 | 0 | 3 | 66 | 157 | –91 | 9 | 23 | 1 | 1 | 6 |
| (England) Newcastle Falcons | 4 | 1 | 0 | 3 | 63 | 132 | –69 | 8 | 19 | 1 | 0 | 5 |
| (England) Bath | 4 | 0 | 1 | 3 | 68 | 105 | –37 | 8 | 14 | 0 | 1 | 3 |
| (France) Perpignan | 4 | 0 | 0 | 4 | 68 | 118 | –50 | 10 | 18 | 1 | 0 | 1 |
| (Italy) Zebre Parma | 4 | 0 | 0 | 4 | 56 | 107 | –51 | 8 | 17 | 0 | 1 | 1 |
Green background (rows 1 to 6) are qualification places for the Challenge Cup round of 16. Starting table — source: EPCR * Bristol Bears were deducted 5 match points for selecting an ineligible player

=== Pool B ===
Pool B
| Team | P | W | D | L | PF | PA | Diff | TF | TA | TB | LB | Pts |
|---|---|---|---|---|---|---|---|---|---|---|---|---|
| (Wales) Scarlets | 4 | 4 | 0 | 0 | 124 | 57 | +67 | 16 | 8 | 2 | 0 | 18 |
| (Italy) Benetton | 4 | 3 | 0 | 1 | 120 | 70 | +50 | 16 | 10 | 3 | 0 | 15 |
| (South Africa) Lions | 4 | 2 | 1 | 1 | 98 | 85 | +13 | 11 | 11 | 2 | 0 | 12 |
| (France) Stade Français | 4 | 2 | 0 | 2 | 85 | 86 | –1 | 11 | 10 | 1 | 1 | 10 |
| (Wales) Dragons | 4 | 1 | 1 | 2 | 98 | 103 | –5 | 12 | 11 | 2 | 2 | 10 |
| (South Africa) Cheetahs | 4 | 2 | 0 | 2 | 73 | 87 | –14 | 8 | 9 | 1 | 1 | 10 |
| (France) Pau | 4 | 1 | 0 | 3 | 64 | 72 | –8 | 6 | 6 | 0 | 3 | 7 |
| (France) Bayonne | 4 | 0 | 0 | 4 | 28 | 130 | –102 | 4 | 19 | 0 | 0 | 0 |
Green background (rows 1 to 6) are qualification places for the Challenge Cup round of 16. Starting table — source: EPCR

== Knockout stage ==
The knockout stage was played across 31 March/1/2 April with a single leg round of 16 matches consisting of the top six ranked teams from each pool and the teams ranked 9th and 10th in each pool of the 2022–23 European Rugby Champions Cup (Clermont, Lyon, Racing 92 and Sale Sharks denoted by * in the bracket). The Round of 16 followed a pre-determined format, while the quarter-finals and semi-finals always guaranteed home advantage to the higher ranked team.

The last-16 were dominated by clubs from Top 14 (eight) and the United Rugby Championship (six), with only two English clubs reaching the knockout stages - both eliminated in the first play-off round along with the only Irish team, Connacht, while both South African clubs departed by the quarter-finals. Treviso became the first Italian side to reach a European semi-final, as three URC teams from three different countries(Italy, Scotland and Wales) reached the final four along with French giant Toulon.

Round of 16
B1 | (Wales) Scarlets | 19
A6 | (France) Brive | 7
A4 | (England) Bristol Bears | 26
B9* | (France) Clermont | 33
A2 | (Scotland) Glasgow Warriors | 73
B5 | (Wales) Dragons | 33
B3 | (South Africa) Lions | 51
A10* | (France) Racing 92 | 28
A1 | (France) Toulon | 36
B6 | (South Africa) Cheetahs | 21
B4 | (France) Stade Français | 24
A9* | (France) Lyon | 41
B2 | (Italy) Benetton | 41
A5 | (Ireland) Connacht | 19
A3 | (Wales) Cardiff | 28
B10* | (England) Sale Sharks | 27

Quarter-finals
B1 | (Wales) Scarlets | 32
B9 | (France) Clermont | 30
A2 | (Scotland) Glasgow Warriors | 31
B3 | (South Africa) Lions | 21
A1 | (France) Toulon | 48
A9 | (France) Lyon | 23
B2 | (Italy) Benetton | 27
A3 | (Wales) Cardiff | 23

Semi-finals
B1 | (Wales) Scarlets | 17
A2 | (Scotland) Glasgow Warriors | 35
A1 | (France) Toulon | 23
B2 | (Italy) Benetton | 0

Final
A2 | (Scotland) Glasgow Warriors | 19
A1 | (France) Toulon | 43

=== Round of 16 ===
31 March 2023
20:00

| Bristol Bears (England) | 26–33 | (France) Clermont |
| Try: Randall 33' c Radradra 37' c Con: MacGinty (2/2) 34', 38'; Pen: MacGinty (4/5) 10', 17', 49', 77' | Report | Try: Lavanini 23' c Penaud (2) 27' c, 70' m Moala 39' m Con: Belleau (2/4) 24', 28'; Pen: Belleau (3/3) 13', 42', 56' |

Ashton Gate Stadium, Bristol
Attendance: 11,207
Referee: Jaco Peyper (South Africa)

31 March 2023
20:00

| Scarlets (Wales) | 19–7 | (France) Brive |
| Try: Fifita 50' m Shingler 78' m Pen: Costelow (3/3) 3', 15', 28' | Report | Try: Olding 46' c Con: Olding (1/1) 48' |

Parc y Scarlets, Llanelli
Attendance: 7,784
Referee: Anthony Woodthorpe (England)

1 April 2023
13:30

| Toulon (France) | 36–21 | (South Africa) Cheetahs |
| Try: Salles 12' c Baubigny 30' m Luc 40+1' c Isa 47' m Wainiqolo 53' c Con: Salles (3/5) 13', 40+5', 54' | Report | Try: Van Rensburg 42' c Jasper 58' c Bernardo 71' c Con: Pienaar (3/3) 43', 59', 72' |

Stade Mayol, Toulon
Attendance: 5,500
Referee: Andrea Piardi (Italy)

1 April 2023
16:00

| Stade Français (France) | 24–41 | (France) Lyon |
| Try: Dachary 47' m Penalty try 19'; Pen: Segonds (4/5) 6', 42', 44', 61' | Report | Try: Penalty try 50'; Couilloud 56' c Marchand 77' m Dumortier 79' c Con: Sopoaga (2/3) 57', 80'; Pen: Sopoaga (5/5) 8', 30', 36', 70', 73' |

Stade Jean-Bouin, Paris
Attendance: 7,500
Referee: Frank Murphy (Ireland)

1 April 2023
16:00

| Benetton (Italy) | 41–19 | (Ireland) Connacht |
| Try: Watson (2) 20' c, 52' c Smith 27' c Padovani (2) 36' c, 45' m Ruzza 61' m Con: Umaga (4/6) 21', 28', 37', 53'; Pen: Umaga (1/2) 75' | Report | Try: Oliver 12' m Porch (2) 17' c, 56' c Con: Hawkshaw (1/2) 18'; Forde (1/1) 57' |

Stadio Comunale di Monigo, Treviso
Attendance: 5,000
Referee: Christophe Ridley (England)

1 April 2023
17:30

| Glasgow Warriors (Scotland) | 73–33 | (Wales) Dragons |
| Try: Horne 2' c Matthews (5) 14' c, 22' m, 26' c, 33' c, 42' c Turner 56' c Forbes 58' c Jones 60' c Steyn (2) 72' m, 80' c Con: Horne (8/10) 3', 15', 27', 34', 43', 57', 59', 61' c Miotti (1/1) 80' | Report | Try: J. Williams 18' c Dyer 29' c Rosser 38' c Dee (2) 45' c, 75' c Con: Reed (4/5) 19', 39', 46', 77' |

Scotstoun Stadium, Glasgow
Attendance: 5,140
Referee: Tual Trainini (France)

1 April 2023
18:30

| Lions (South Africa) | 51–28 | (France) Racing 92 |
| Try: Louw (2) 4' c, 51' c Van der Merwe 7' c Maxwane 22' c R. Venter 40' c Lombard 54' c Nohamba 66' c Con: Nohamba (5/6) 5', 40'+1, 52', 55', 67; Pen: Nohamba (1/1) 17' | Report | Try: Moukoro (2) 11' c, 28' c Volavola 48' c Taofifénua 58' c Con: Le Garrec (3/3) 12', 29', 48'c Spring (1/1) 59' |

Ellis Park Stadium, Johannesburg
Attendance: 2,894
Referee: Karl Dickson (England)

1 April 2023
20:00

| Cardiff (Wales) | 28–27 | (England) Sale Sharks |
| Try: Domachowski 19' c Adams (2) 33' m, 40'+2 c Con: Evans (2/3) 20', 40'+3; Pen: Evans (2/2) 9', 71'; Priestland (1/1) 43' | Report | Try: Van der Merwe 15' c Roebuck 51' c Ashman 63' c Con: Ford (3/3) 16', 52', 63'; Pen: Ford (2/2) 29', 58' |

Cardiff Arms Park, Cardiff
Attendance: 7,512
Referee: Luc Ramos (France)

=== Quarter-finals ===
7 April 2023
20:00

| Scarlets (Wales) | 32–30 | (France) Clermont |
| Try: Halfpenny 7' m Costelow 14' c J. Williams 36' c Conbeer 76' c Con: Halfpenny (1/2) 15'; Costelow (2/2) 37', 76'; Pen: Halfpenny (1/1) 6'; Costelow (1/2) 68' | Report | Try: Simone 20' m Raka (2) 29' c, 44' m Beria 64' c Con: Belleau (1/3) 31'; Plisson (1/1) 64'; Pen: Belleau (2/2) 3', 35' |

Parc y Scarlets, Llanelli
Attendance: 7,634
Referee: Wayne Barnes (England)

8 April 2023
13:30

| Toulon (France) | 48–23 | (France) Lyon |
| Try: Wainiqolo (2) 29' m, 66' m Baubigny 38' c Priso 40+3' c Nayacalevu 49' c Ollivon 57' c Luc 77' c Con: West (4/5) 39', 40+5, 50', 58'; Biggar (1/2) 78'; Pen: West (1/1) 5' | Report | Try: Couilloud 61' c Arnold 71' c Con: Berdeu (2/2) 61', 72'; Pen: Sopoaga (3/4) 2', 8', 46' |

Stade Mayol, Toulon
Attendance: 12,095
Referee: Mike Adamson (Scotland)

8 April 2023
16:00

| Benetton (Italy) | 27–23 | (Wales) Cardiff |
| Try: Smith 20' c Lamaro 56' c Watson 68' c Con: Umaga (2/2) 21', 57'; Albornoz (1/1) 70'; Pen: Umaga (2/2) 6', 12' | Report | Try: Young 30' c Grady 46' c Con: Priestland (2/2) 30', 47'; Pen: Priestland (2/2) 43', 61' |

Stadio Comunale di Monigo, Treviso
Attendance: 5,000
Referee: Luke Pearce (England)

8 April 2023
20:00

| Glasgow Warriors (Scotland) | 31–21 | (South Africa) Lions |
| Try: Dempsey 9' c Dobie 17' c Z. Fagerson 48' c Jordan 73' c Con: Horne (4/4) 10', 19', 49', 74'; Pen: Horne (1/1) 68' | Report | Try: Nohamba 43' c F. Horn 64' c Brandon 76' c Con: Nohamba (1/1) 43'; Lombard (2/2) 65', 76' |

Scotstoun Stadium, Glasgow
Attendance: 4,249
Referee: Matthew Carley (England)

=== Semi-finals ===
The higher-ranked club gained home stadium advantage, however, in the event that a South African team had been the higher ranked side, the game would have been located in Europe.

29 April 2023
17:30

| Scarlets (Wales) | 17–35 | (Scotland) Glasgow Warriors |
| Try: Steff Evans 31' m Pen: Costelow (4/4) 24’, 28’, 40’, 46’ | Report | Try: McDowall (2) 2' c, 79' c Horne 43' c Matthews 50' c Darge 56' c Con: Horne (5/5) 4’, 43’, 51’, 57’, 80’ + 1 |

Parc y Scarlets, Llanelli
Attendance: 13,077
Referee: Mathieu Raynal (France)

30 April 2023
13:30

| Toulon (France) | 23–0 | (Italy) Benetton |
| Try: Paia'aua 4' c Gigashvili 17' c Con: Biggar (2/2) 5', 17'; Pen: Biggar (3/3) 13', 42', 46' | Report |

Stade Mayol, Toulon
Attendance: 10,000
Referee: Karl Dickson (England)

=== Final ===
19 May 2023
20:00 IST (UTC+01)

| Glasgow Warriors (Scotland) | 19–43 | (France) Toulon |
| Try: Steyn (2) 55' c, 73' c Cancelliere 68' m Con: Horne (2/3) 56', 74' | Report | Try: Serin (2) 4' c, 24' c Parisse 17' c Wainiqolo 57' m Nayacalevu 63' m West 77' c Con: Serin (3/3) 5', 18', 26'; Paillaugue (2/3) 64', 79'; Pen: Paillaugue (1/2) 50' |

Aviva Stadium, Dublin
Attendance: 31,514
Referee: Wayne Barnes (England)

== Leading scorers ==
Note: Flags to the left of player names indicate national team as has been defined under World Rugby eligibility rules, or primary nationality for players who have not yet earned international senior caps. Players may hold one or more non-WR nationalities.

=== Most points ===
As of 30 April 2023

| Rank | Player | Club | Points |
|---|---|---|---|
| 1 | (Wales) Sam Costelow | (Wales) Scarlets | 62 |
| 2 | (Wales) Rhys Priestland | (Wales) Cardiff | 57 |
| 3 | (Scotland) George Horne | (Scotland) Glasgow | 47 |
| 4 | (Wales) Dan Biggar | (France) Toulon | 39 |
| 5 | (United States) AJ MacGinty | (England) Bristol | 38 |

=== Most tries ===
As of 29 April 2023

| Rank | Player | Club | Tries |
|---|---|---|---|
| 1 | (Scotland) Johnny Matthews | (Scotland) Glasgow | 7 |
| 2 | (Wales) Josh Adams | (Wales) Cardiff | 6 |
| 2 | (Fiji) Jiuta Wainiqolo | (France) Toulon | 6 |
| 2 | (Wales) Steff Evans | (Wales) Scarlets | 6 |
| 5 | (South Africa) Rhyno Smith | (Italy) Benetton | 5 |

== See also ==
- 2022–23 European Rugby Champions Cup
