= Alex Brown (rugby union, born 1989) =

- Born: Alexander Brown; 13 October 1989 (age 37) Rochford, England
- Height: 1.85 m (6 ft 1 in)
- Weight: 125 kg (19 st 10 lb; 276 lb)

Rugby union career
- Position: Prop
- Current team: Perpignan
Senior career
Years	Team	Apps	(Points)
2009–2011	Saracens	1	(0)
2011–2012	Doncaster Knights	24	(0)
2012–2016	Exeter Chiefs	59	(0)
2016–	Perpignan	27	(0)
- Correct as of 6 May 2018
International career
Years	Team	Apps	(Points)
- England U18

Alexander Brown (born 13 October 1989) is a rugby union player for Perpignan in the Top 14. He plays as a Prop.

Brown is a former member of the Saracens Academy, While a part of the academy, Brown was dual registered with Bedford Blues to aid his development. Brown joined Doncaster in 2011. After establishing himself as a regular in the Doncaster side it was announced on 10 April 2012 that Brown and fellow Doncaster forward Jack Yeandle would be joining Aviva Premiership side Exeter Chiefs. Brown currently plays for the Top 14 (highest tier of French rugby union) team Perpignan.
