= Julien Marchand =

France international rugby union player

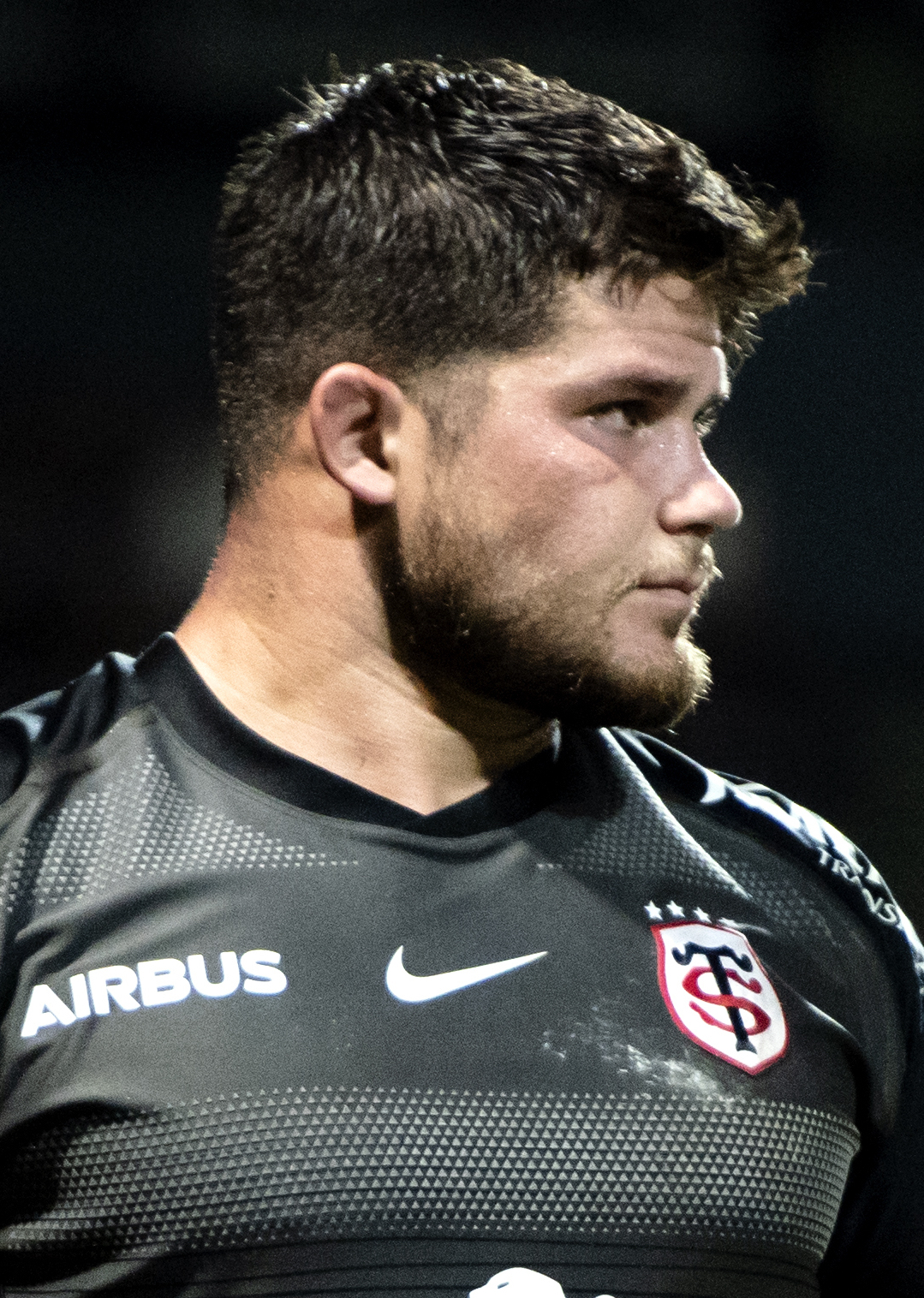
- Marchand representing Toulouse during the Top 14
- Born: 10 May 1995 (age 31) Loures-Barousse, France
- Height: 1.81 m (5 ft 11 in)
- Weight: 109 kg (240 lb; 17 st 2 lb)
- Notable relative: Guillaume Marchand (brother)

Rugby union career
- Position: Hooker
- Current team: Toulouse
Senior career
Years	Team	Apps	(Points)
2014–	Toulouse	192	(90)
- Correct as of 12 November 2024
International career
Years	Team	Apps	(Points)
2015	France U20	8	(0)
2018–	France	53	(25)
- Correct as of 14 March 2026

Julien Marchand (born 10 May 1995), is a French professional rugby union player who plays as a hooker for Top 14 club Toulouse and the France national team.

== Career statistics ==
=== List of international tries ===
International tries
No.	Date	Venue	Opponent	Score	Result	Competition
1	5 November 2022	Stade de France, Saint-Denis, France	Australia	17–13	30–29	2022 Autumn internationals
2	31 January 2025	Stade de France, Saint-Denis, France	Wales	33–0	43–0	2025 Six Nations
3	15 November 2025	Stade Atlantique, Bordeaux, France	Fiji	12–0	34–21	2025 Autumn internationals
4	22 November 2025	Stade de France, Saint-Denis, France	Australia	32–26	48–33	2025 Autumn internationals
5	15 February 2026	Millennium Stadium, Cardiff, Wales	Wales	7–31	12–54	2026 Six Nations

== Honours ==
France

- 3x Six Nations Championship: 2022, 2025, 2026
- 1× Grand Slam: 2022

Toulouse

- 2× European Rugby Champions Cup: 2021, 2024
- 6× Top 14: 2019, 2021, 2023, 2024, 2025, 2026
