= Antoine Hastoy =

France international rugby union player (born 1997)

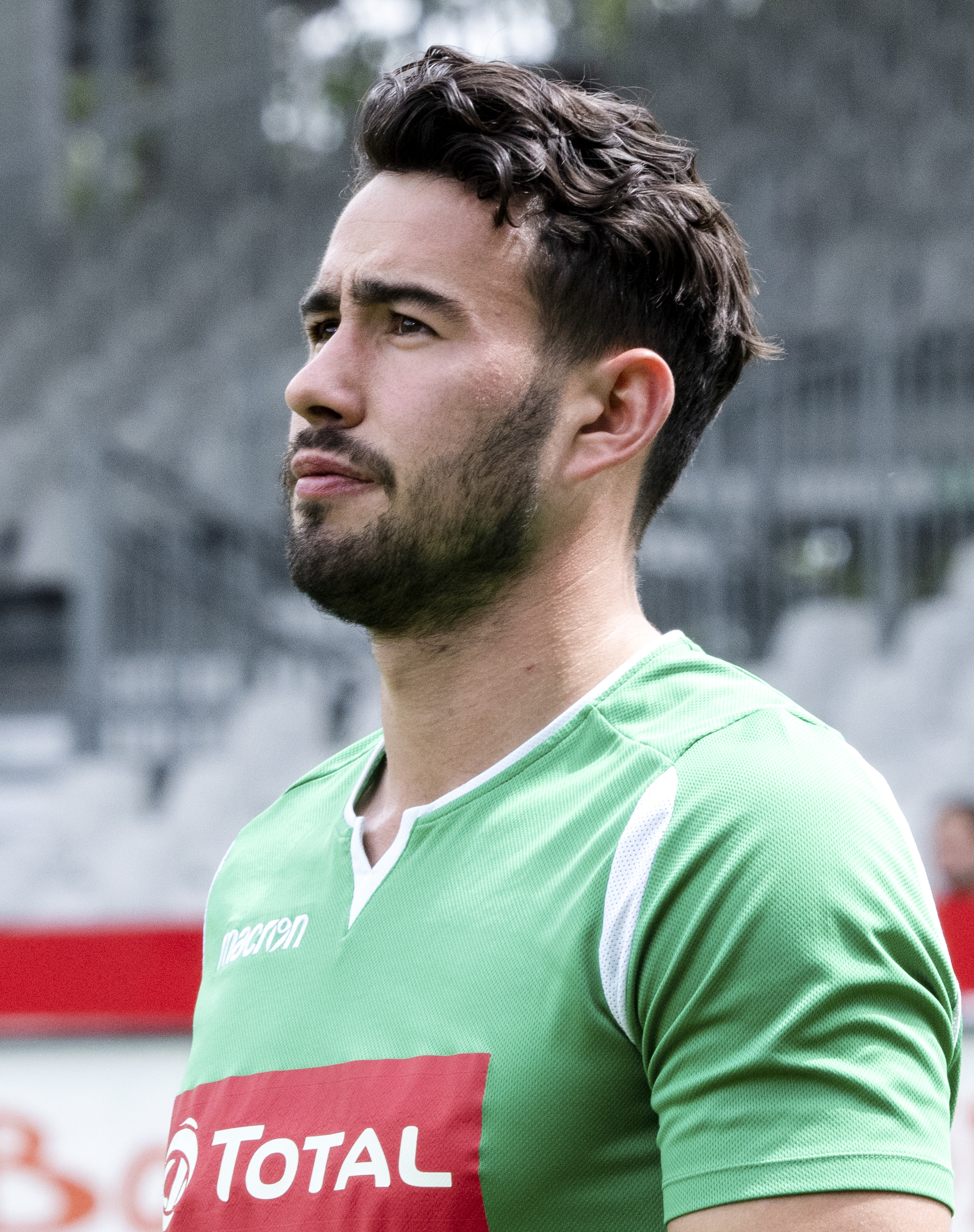
- Hastoy representing Pau during the Top 14
- Born: 4 June 1997 (age 29) Bayonne, France
- Height: 1.80 m (5 ft 11 in)
- Weight: 86 kg (190 lb; 13 st 8 lb)

Rugby union career
- Position(s): Fly-half, Fullback
- Current team: La Rochelle
Senior career
Years	Team	Apps	(Points)
2016–2022	Pau	102	(763)
2022–	La Rochelle	83	(743)
- Correct as of 19 July 2025
International career
Years	Team	Apps	(Points)
2021–	France	10	(30)
- Correct as of 19 July 2025

Antoine Hastoy (born 4 June 1997) is a French professional rugby union player who plays as a fly-half for Top 14 club La Rochelle and the France national team.

== Early life ==
Antoine Hastoy was born on 4 June 1997 in Bayonne, France and was raised in the Pau area. He started rugby with the Billère-Lescar amateur club at six years old, and then joined Pau academy in 2011.

== Club career ==
=== Pau ===
On 21 May 2016, Hastoy played his first professional game with Pau, coming off the bench in a away loss at Racing 92.

Six seasons later, he played his hundredth with the team on 30 April 2022.

=== La Rochelle ===
After eleven years in Pau, he moved to La Rochelle in 2022 and won the 2022–23 European Rugby Champions Cup with his new team, starting at the 10 in the final against Leinster.

In November 2025, he became the fastest player ever to receive a red card in the Top 14. After 34 seconds, he received a straight red for after leaving his foot in the air when challenging for a high ball. His studs connected with Aaron Grandidier-Nkanang and he was sent off.

== International career ==
=== France ===
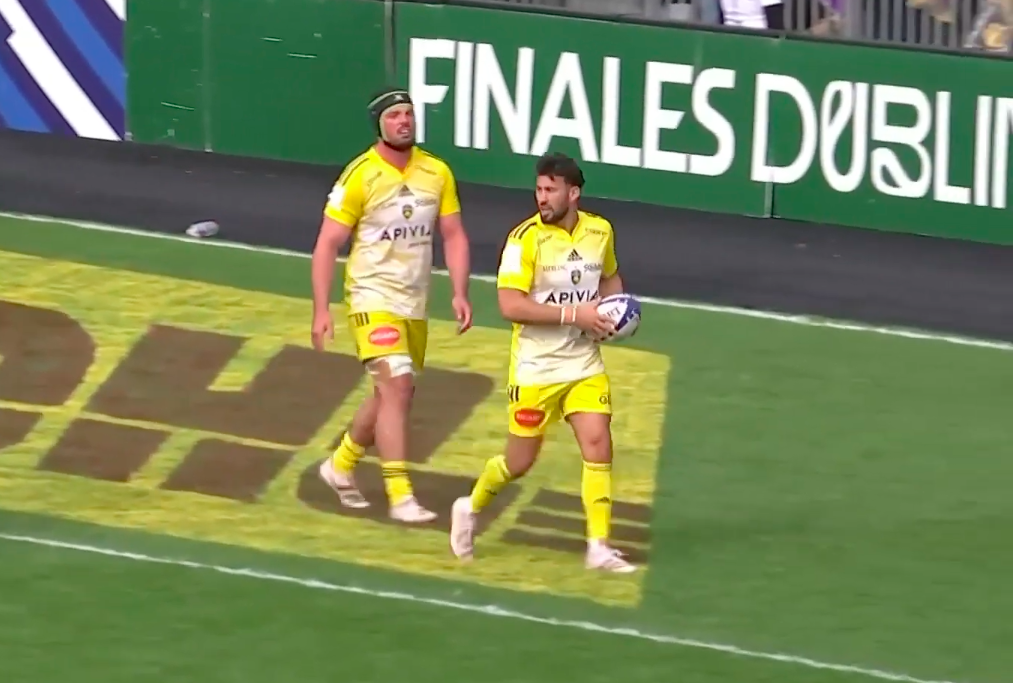
Grégory Alldritt (left) and Hastoy (right) playing for La Rochelle in 2023

Hastoy was called by Fabien Galthié to the French national team for the first time in June 2021, for the summer tour of Australia. He made his international debut in a loss against the Wallabies on 17 July.

== Career statistics ==
=== List of international tries ===
International tries
No.	Date	Venue	Opponent	Score	Result	Competition
1	14 September 2023	Stade Pierre-Mauroy, Lille, France	Uruguay	8–5	27–12	2023 Rugby World Cup

== Honours ==
La Rochelle

- 1× European Rugby Champions Cup: 2022–23
