= Jules Gimbert =

French rugby player (born 1998)

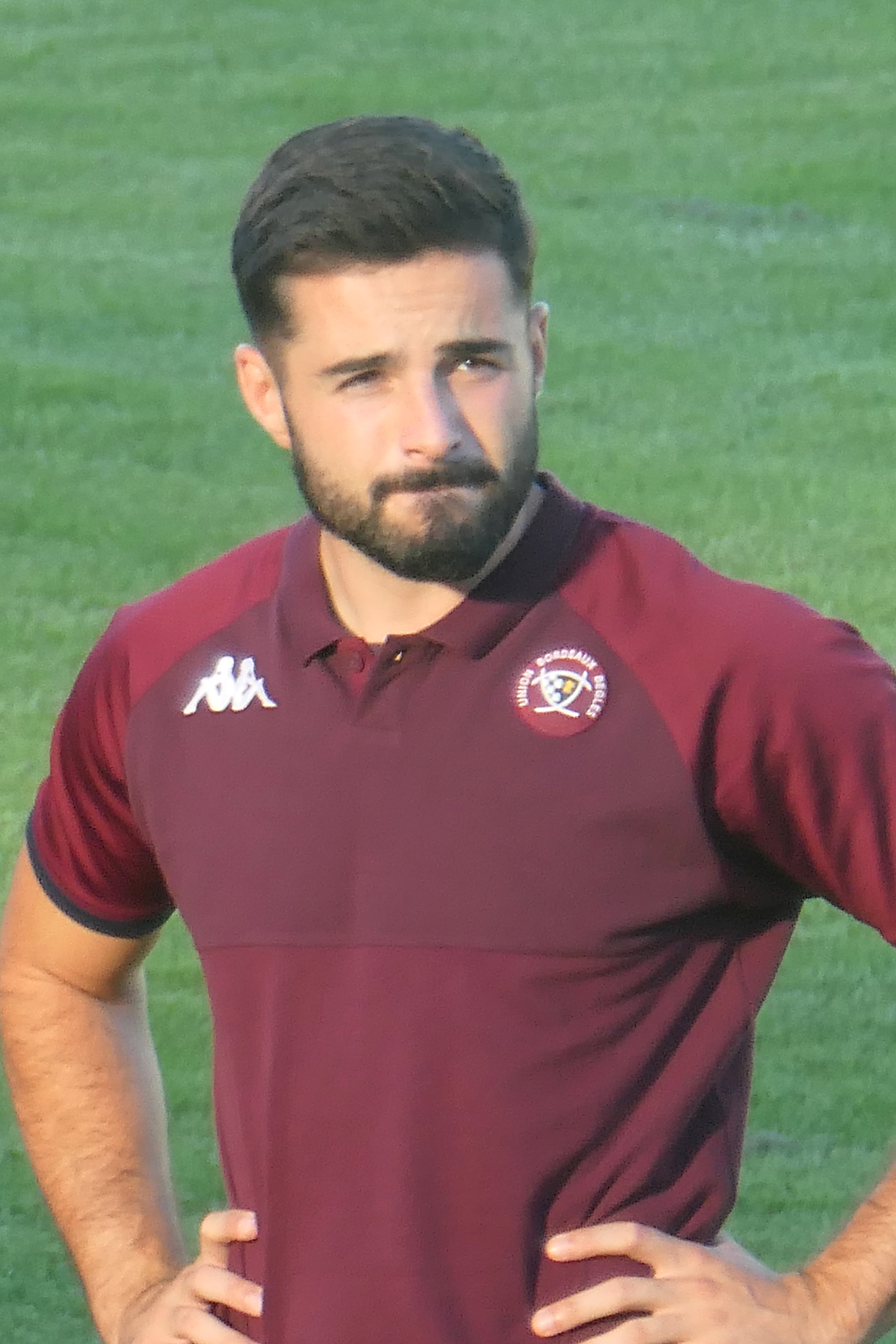
- Jules Gimbert in 2022
- Born: Jules Gimbert; 2 March 1998 (age 28) Bordeaux, France
- Height: 1.70 m (5 ft 7 in)
- Weight: 75 kg (11 st 11 lb)

Rugby union career
- Position: Scrum-half
- Current team: Nice
Amateur team(s)
Years	Team	Apps	(Points)
- CA Bordeaux Bègles
- Bordeaux Bègles
Senior career
Years	Team	Apps	(Points)
2017–2023	Bordeaux Bègles	57	(35)
2023–2024	Stade Français	17	(0)
2024–	Nice	11	(37)
- Correct as of 6 June 2025
International career
Years	Team	Apps	(Points)
2018	France U20	10	(18)
- Correct as of 17 June 2018

Jules Gimbert (born 2 March 1998) is a French rugby union player. His position is scrum-half and he currently plays for Nice in Nationale .

== Personal life ==
Gimbert's father is French rugbyman Philippe Gimbert.

== International honours ==
France (U20)

- Six Nations Under 20s Championship winners: 2018
- World Rugby Under 20 Championship winners: 2018
