= UJ Seuteni =

Samoa international rugby union player

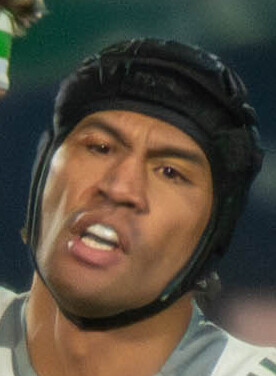
- Full name: Ulupano Junior Seuteni
- Born: 9 December 1993 (age 32) Adelaide, South Australia, Australia
- Height: 1.85 m (6 ft 1 in)
- Weight: 90 kg (198 lb; 14 st 2 lb)
- School: The Southport School

Rugby union career
- Position(s): Centre, Fullback, Fly-half
- Current team: La Rochelle
Senior career
Years	Team	Apps	(Points)
2015	Toulon	5	(0)
2016–2018	Oyonnax	36	(25)
2018–2022	Bordeaux Bègles	78	(98)
2022–	La Rochelle	26	(40)
- Correct as of 28 August 2023
International career
Years	Team	Apps	(Points)
2012–2013	Australia U20	8	(7)
2019–	Samoa	12	(21)
- Correct as of 28 August 2023

Ulupano Junior Seuteni (born 9 December 1993) is a professional rugby union player who plays as a centre for Top 14 club La Rochelle. Born in Australia, he represents Samoa at international level after qualifying on ancestry grounds.

== Club career ==
Seuteni was named in the Reds Extended Playing Squad for the 2012 Super Rugby season despite being only 17 years old and still in his final year at school. He missed the majority of the season through injury, however he retained his spot in the Reds EPS for the 2013 season. He won the 2022–23 European Rugby Champions Cup with La Rochelle.

== International career ==
He was a member of the Australia Under 20 side which competed in the 2012 IRB Junior World Championship in South Africa where he made 4 appearances and made 2 conversions.
