= Grégory Alldritt =

French rugby union player (born 1997)

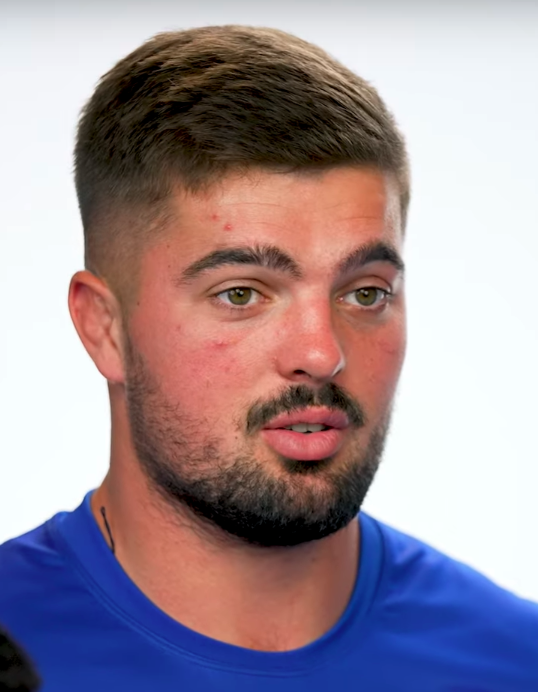
- Alldritt representing France
- Born: 23 March 1997 (age 29) Toulouse, France
- Height: 1.91 m (6 ft 3 in)
- Weight: 115 kg (254 lb; 18 st 2 lb)

Rugby union career
- Position(s): Number 8, Flanker
- Current team: La Rochelle
Senior career
Years	Team	Apps	(Points)
2016–2017	Auch	14	(10)
2017–	La Rochelle	135	(190)
- Correct as of 18 January 2025
International career
Years	Team	Apps	(Points)
2019–	France	58	(30)
- Correct as of 22 November 2025

Grégory Alldritt (born 23 March 1997) is a French professional rugby union player who plays as a number eight for Top 14 club La Rochelle and the France national team.

== Early life ==
Grégory Alldritt was born on 23 March 1997 in Toulouse, France and grew up in Condom, in the department of Gers. His father, Terence, was born in Kenya to Irish and Danish parents and lived in Stirling, Scotland before settling down in France while his mother is French and has Italian roots. He has two older brothers: Tom and Scott.

== Professional career ==
Alldritt won his first cap for France as a replacement in the side's 24–19 loss to Wales in the 2019 Six Nations.

Alldritt was named as the captain of the French team for the 2024 Six Nations Championship.

== Career statistics ==
=== List of international tries ===
International tries
No.	Date	Venue	Opponent	Score	Result	Competition
1	23 February 2019	Stade de France, Saint-Denis, France	Scotland	20–3	27–10	2019 Six Nations
2	23 February 2019	Stade de France, Saint-Denis, France	Scotland	25–10	27–10	2019 Six Nations
3	17 August 2019	Allianz Riviera, Nice, France	Scotland	20–3	32–3	2019 Rugby World Cup warm-up matches
4	9 February 2020	Stade de France, Saint-Denis, France	Italy	18–10	35–22	2020 Six Nations
5	31 January 2025	Stade de France, Saint-Denis, France	Wales	43–0	43–0	2025 Six Nations
6	23 February 2025	Stadio Olimpico, Rome, Italy	Italy	17–40	24–73	2025 Six Nations

== Honours ==
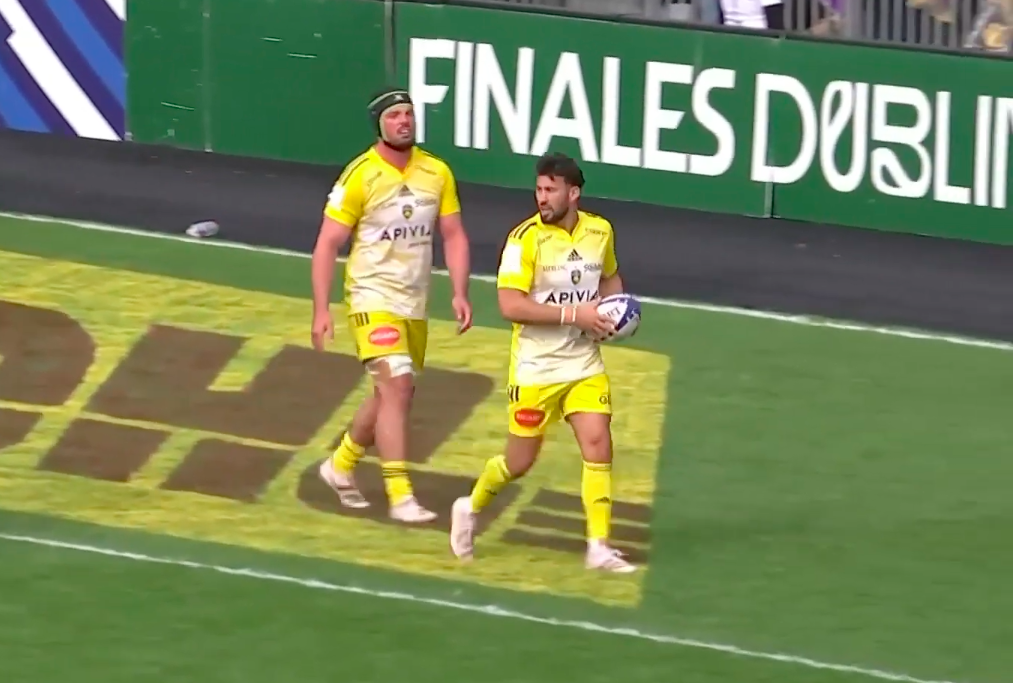
Alldritt (left) and Antoine Hastoy (right) playing for La Rochelle in 2023

La Rochelle

- 2× European Rugby Champions Cup: 2022, 2023
- 1× European Rugby Champions Cup runner-up: 2021
- 1× European Rugby Challenge Cup runner-up: 2019
- 1× Top 14 runner-up: 2021

France

- 2x Six Nations Championship: 2022, 2025
- 1× Grand Slam: 2022

Individual

- 1× European Professional Club Rugby Player of the Year: 2023
