= Guillaume Marchand =

French rugby union player

- Born: Guillaume Marchand; 5 June 1998 (age 28) Saint-Gaudens, France
- Height: 1.83 m (6 ft 0 in)
- Weight: 109 kg (17 st 2 lb; 240 lb)

Rugby union career
- Position: Hooker
- Current team: Lyon
Amateur team(s)
Years	Team	Apps	(Points)
- US Montréjeau
2013–2018	Toulouse		
Senior career
Years	Team	Apps	(Points)
2018–2021	Toulouse	49	(10)
2021–	Lyon	94	(65)
- Correct as of 12 November 2024
International career
Years	Team	Apps	(Points)
2018	France U20	8	(0)
- Correct as of 17 June 2018

Guillaume Marchand (born 5 June 1998) is a French rugby union player. His position is hooker and he currently plays for Lyon in the Top 14.

== Personal life ==
Marchand is the younger brother of Julien Marchand, who plays with Stade Toulousain as a hooker.

== Honours ==
=== Club ===
(France) Toulouse

- Top 14: 2018–19

=== International ===
France (U20)

- Six Nations Under 20s Championship: 2018
- World Rugby Under 20 Championship: 2018
