= Thomas Darmon =

French rugby union player (born 1998)

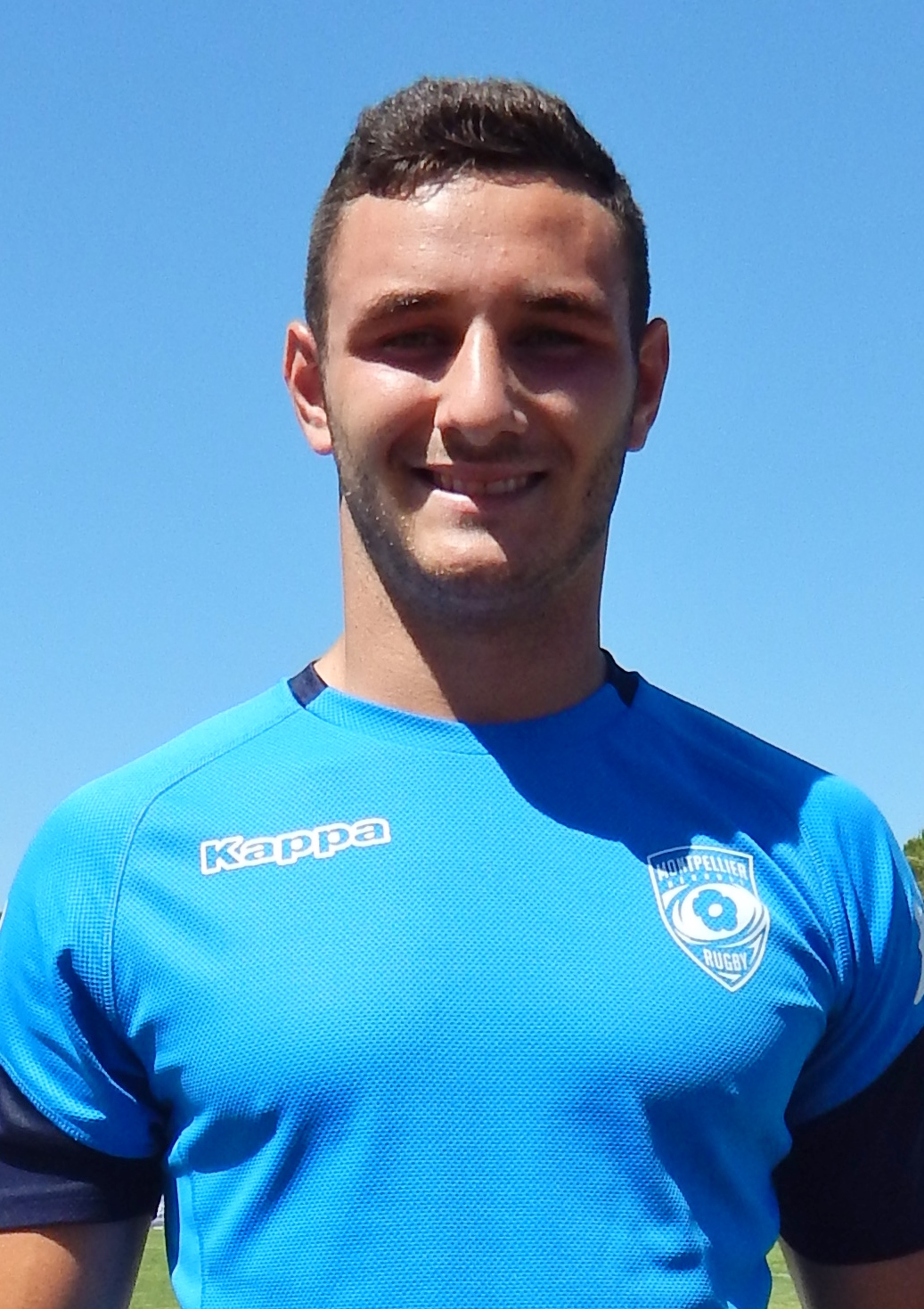
- Darmon representing Montpellier during the Top 14
- Born: 12 May 1998 (age 28) Sète, France
- Height: 1.81 m (5 ft 11 in)
- Weight: 88 kg (194 lb; 13 st 12 lb)

Rugby union career
- Position(s): Centre, Fly-half
- Current team: Montpellier
Senior career
Years	Team	Apps	(Points)
2017–	Montpellier	121	(82)
- Correct as of 4 February 2025
International career
Years	Team	Apps	(Points)
2017	France U20	3	(11)
- Correct as of 28 May 2023

Thomas Darmon (born 12 May 1998) is a French professional rugby union player who plays as a centre for Top 14 club Montpellier.

== Honours ==
Montpellier

- 1× Top 14: 2022

France U18

- 2× Rugby Europe Under-18 Championship: 2015, 2016
