= Jack Yeandle =

English rugby union player

Stephen Jack Yeandle
- Born: Stephen Jack Yeandle; 22 December 1989 (age 36) Exeter, England
- Height: 1.85 m (6 ft 1 in)
- Weight: 111 kg (17 st 7 lb)
- University: Cardiff Metropolitan University

Rugby union career
- Position: Hooker
Amateur team(s)
Years	Team	Apps	(Points)
- Crediton RFC
2007–2010	Cardiff Metropolitan University		
Senior career
Years	Team	Apps	(Points)
2011–2012	Doncaster Knights	13	(0)
2012–	Exeter Chiefs	238	(135)

Stephen Jack Yeandle (born 22 December 1989) Yeandle is the current club captain for Exeter Chiefs in the Aviva Premiership. His playing position is Hooker. Yeandle Joined Exeter from former RFU Championship rivals Doncaster Knights along with Doncaster teammate Alex Brown. He was a replacement as Exeter Chiefs defeated Wasps to be crowned champions of the 2016–17 English Premiership.
