= Christophe Urios =

French rugby union player and coach (born 1973)

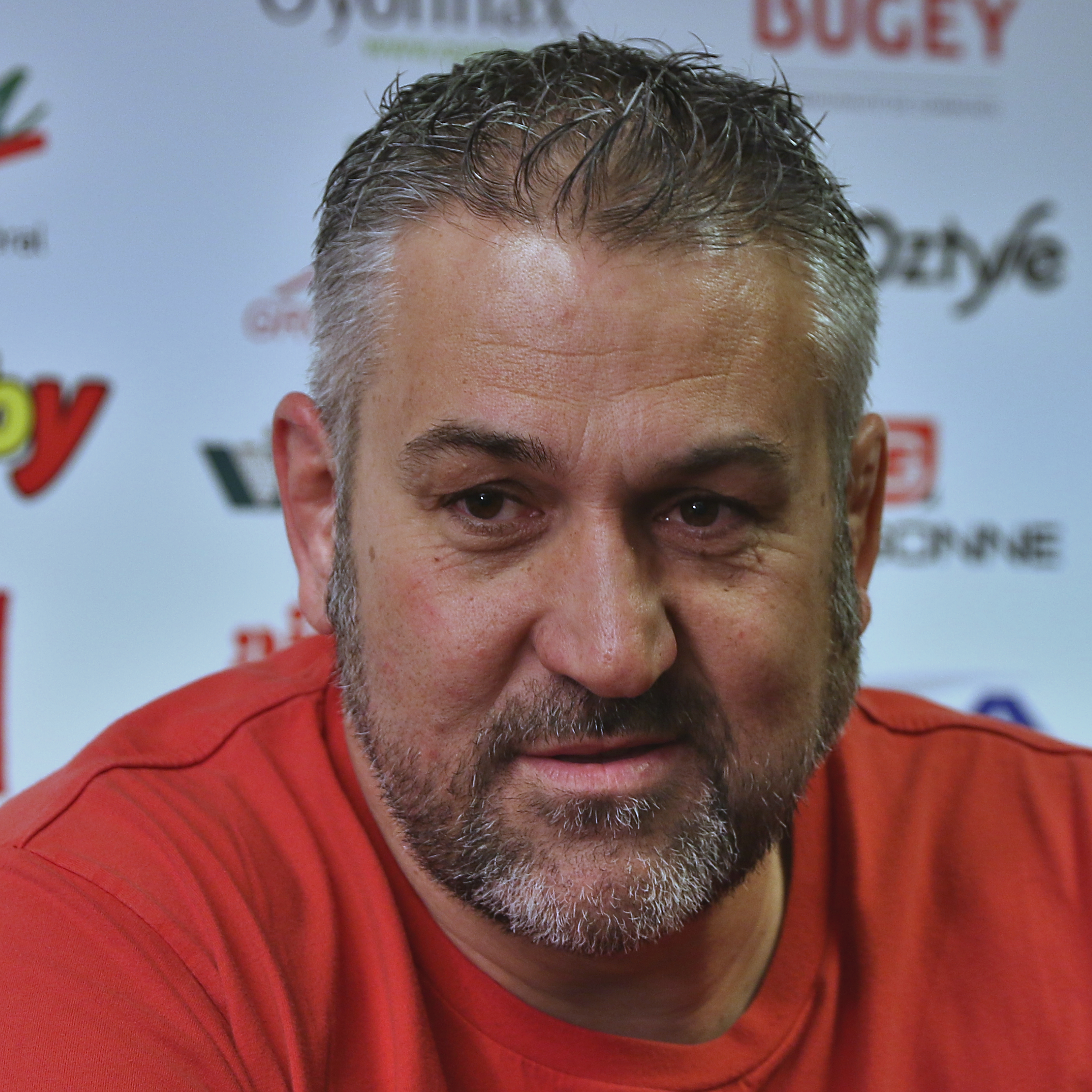
- Urios in 2015
- Born: Christophe Urios; 20 December 1965 (age 60) Montpellier, France
- Height: 1.83 m (6 ft 0 in)

Rugby union career
- Position: Hooker
Senior career
Years	Team	Apps	(Points)
- AS Olonzac
1985–1990	Carcassonne		
1990–1999	Castres		
Coaching career
- Years: Team
- 2002–2005: Castres
- 2005–2007: Bourgoin-Jallieu
- 2007–2015: Oyonnax
- 2015–2019: Castres
- 2019–2022: Bordeaux Bègles
- 2023–: Clermont

Christophe Urios (born 20 December 1965) is a French rugby union player and coach. He is currently the head coach of Top 14 club ASM Clermont Auvergne.

== Rugby career ==
=== Coaching ===
In 2015, he arrived at Castres Olympique as sports director. He qualified Castres to the play-offs in his first season. In his third season at the head of Castres, he led his team to sixth place in the regular phase of the championship then eliminated Stade Toulousain in the play-offs and Racing 92 in the semi-finals. Castres became champions of France by beating Montpellier in the final, the favorites, by the score of 29 to 13.

In July 2018, Castres Olympique announced that Christophe Urios would leave the club at the end of the 2018–19 season. In November 2018, Union Bordeaux Bègles announced in turn that he would be the club's new manager from June 2019.
