= Luke Pearce =

Professional rugby union referee

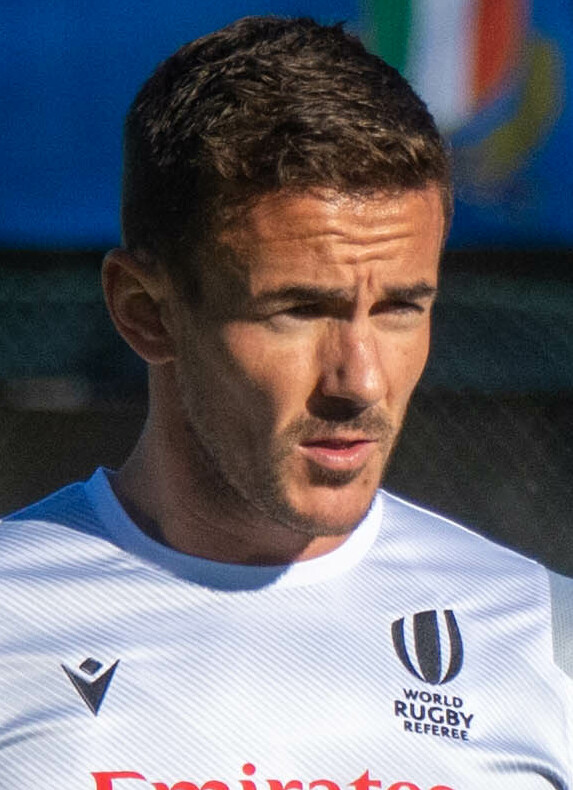
- Born: 13 November 1987 (age 39) Pontypool, Wales
- Occupation: Rugby union referee

Rugby union career
Refereeing career
Years	Competition	Apps
2011-	RFU Premiership	
2011-	Anglo-Welsh Cup	
2011-	European Challenge Cup	
2013-	European Champions Cup	
2013-	Test matches	
- Correct as of 28 March 2017

Luke Pearce (born 13 November 1987) is an English rugby union referee representing the Rugby Football Union. He is a regular referee in the English Premiership and has refereed games at European level and at the 2019 Rugby World Cup.

== Refereeing career ==
Pearce, who grew up in Exeter, joined the Devon Referee Society in 2005 at the age of 16. He previously played rugby at junior level, being part of the Exeter Saracens Rugby Club and captained a Welsh Exiles Under-16's team. In September 2005, Pearce, refereed his first game, Crediton Seconds against Newton Abbot Thirds. From there, Pearce quickly went through the referee system, becoming the youngest referee to be promoted to the RFU National panel in 2009. By then Luke had already moved through the ranks refereeing in the RFU Championship at the age of 21.

In November 2009, Pearce took charge of the Russian cup final. On 10 September 2011, Pearce took charge of his first Premiership match, officiating Gloucester's home game against Worcester Warriors. That same season, he debuted on the World Sevens Series and since then has appeared in nine series tournaments.

On 18 November 2011, he took charge of his first European game, referring Stade Français's victory over București Wolves during the 2011–12 European Challenge Cup. In February 2013, Pearce refereed his first international, taking charge of Romania against Russia in the European Nations Cup. Later that year, he was appointed by the IRB (now World Rugby) to officiate in the 2013 IRB Junior World Championship in France. This included the semi-final meeting between South Africa U20 and Wales U20. In October that year, Pearce went on to referee his first Heineken Cup match (Toulouse vs Zebre) before going onto officiate his first IRB appointed test match, Russia vs Japan. In 2014, Luke made his first Six Nations Championship appearance, acting as assistant referee for Steve Walsh in the meeting between Italy and Scotland. Weeks later, Pearce was in the middle for the 2014 European Nations Cup decider between Georgia and Romania which also acted as the last stage of qualification for European nations ahead of the 2015 Rugby World Cup. Pearce also featured in the 2014 Africa Cup in Madagascar taking charge in two games.

In 2016, Pearce was assistant referee for Ireland's first ever victory over New Zealand, before he went on to referee his first major Tier 2 v Tier 2 match, Samoa vs Canada. In June 2017, he refereed his first Tier 1 nation, officiating Argentina's home match against Georgia.

In the 2018 mid-year rugby union internationals, he took charge of his first tier 1 vs tier 1 game. On 12 September 2021 he took charge of a Southern Hemisphere international, Australia v South Africa.
