= 2018–19 Top 14 season =

French rugby union league season

2018–19 Top 14
- Countries: France
- Date: 25 August 2018 – 15 June 2019
- Champions: Toulouse (20th title)
- Runners-up: Clermont
- Relegated: Perpignan, Grenoble
- Matches played: 187
- Attendance: 2,734,738 (average 14,624 per match)
- Highest attendance: 79,786 (play-offs); Toulouse v Clermont; 15 June 2019; 43,089 (league); Toulon v Toulouse; 6 April 2019
- Lowest attendance: 6,100; Stade Français v Agen; 13 April 2019
- Top point scorer: (New Zealand) Ihaia West (La Rochelle); 257 points
- Top try scorer: (France) Virimi Vakatawa (Racing); 13 tries

Official website
- www.lnr.fr/rugby-top-14

The 2018–19 Top 14 competition was the 120th season of the French domestic rugby union club competition operated by the Ligue Nationale de Rugby (LNR). Two new teams from the 2017–18 Pro D2 season were promoted to Top 14 (Perpignan and Grenoble) in place of the two relegated teams, Oyonnax and Brive.

On 27 April 2019, Perpignan were relegated after they lost at home to La Rochelle, condemning the newly promoted side to the drop with three games still to play. At one point it looked like Perpignan might go through the whole season without a win but they achieved a victory on 16 February 2019 against Montpellier. They will be joined in 2018–19 Rugby Pro D2 by Grenoble, who lost the relegation playoff game, 22-28, to Brive. Brive and Rugby Pro D2 champions, Bayonne, will play in the 2019–20 Top 14.

The Top 14 final was contested between the top two teams in the league stage – Toulouse (1st) and Clermont (2nd) – who both won their semi-finals. In the end it was Toulouse who triumphed at the Stade de France, seeing out a 24-18 victory to win its 20th title and the clubs first since 2012. It was a victory for Le Stade, who were head and shoulders the team in the league, finishing 15 points clear of Clermont and beating them twice out of three meetings (the other result was a draw). Despite missing out on the title, Clermont, who massively improved on 2017-18 when they finished 9th, and also won the 2018–19 European Rugby Challenge Cup.

In terms of attendances, the Top 14 once again proved to be the most popular rugby union league in the world, with over 2.7 million supporters watching games that season. This was an average of 14,624 per game, slightly higher than the second best supported league - the 2018–19 English Premiership - which had an average of 14,507.

== Teams ==
Locations of the 2018–19 Top 14 teams

Club	City (department)	Stadium	Capacity	Previous season
Agen	Agen (Lot-et-Garonne)	Stade Armandie	14,000	11th
Bordeaux Bègles	Bordeaux (Gironde)	Stade Chaban-Delmas (Note: In recent years, Bordeaux Bègles has taken occasional home matches to Matmut Atlantique.)	34,694	10th
Castres	Castres (Tarn)	Stade Pierre-Fabre	12,500	Champions (6th in league)
Clermont	Clermont-Ferrand (Puy-de-Dôme)	Stade Marcel-Michelin	19,022	9th
Grenoble	Grenoble (Isère)	Stade des Alpes	20,068	Promoted from Pro D2 (play-off)
La Rochelle	La Rochelle (Charente-Maritime)	Stade Marcel-Deflandre	16,000	7th
Lyon	Lyon (Métropole de Lyon)	Matmut Stadium de Gerland	25,000	Semi-finals (5th in league)
Montpellier	Montpellier (Hérault)	Altrad Stadium	15,697	Runners up (1st in league)
Pau	Pau (Pyrénées-Atlantiques)	Stade du Hameau	18,324	8th
Perpignan	Perpignan (Pyrénées-Orientales)	Stade Aimé Giral	14,593	Promoted from Pro D2 (champions)
Racing	Nanterre (Hauts-de-Seine)	Paris La Défense Arena (Note: Racing would play their semi-final qualifier game at the 14,000 capacity Stade Olympique Yves-du-Manoir.)	30,681	Semi-finals (2nd in league)
Stade Français	Paris, 16th arrondissement	Stade Jean-Bouin	20,000	12th
Toulon	Toulon (Var)	Stade Mayol (Note: In recent years, Toulon has taken occasional home matches to Stade Vélodrome in Marseille and Allianz Riviera in Nice.)	18,200	Quarter-finals (4th in league)
Toulouse	Toulouse (Haute-Garonne)	Stade Ernest-Wallon (Note: Toulouse often takes high-demand home matches to the city's largest sporting venue, Stadium Municipal.)	19,500	Quarter-finals (3rd in league)

== Number of teams by region ==
Teams	Region or country	Team(s)
4	Nouvelle-Aquitaine	Agen, Bordeaux Bègles, La Rochelle, and Pau
4	Occitanie	Castres, Montpellier, Perpignan, and Toulouse
3	Auvergne-Rhône-Alpes	Clermont, Grenoble, and Lyon
2	Île-de-France	Racing and Stade Français
1	Provence-Alpes-Côte d'Azur	Toulon

== Competition format ==
The top six teams at the end of the regular season (after all the teams played one another twice, once at home, once away) enter a knockout stage to decide the Champions of France. This consists of three rounds: the teams finishing third to sixth in the table play quarter-finals (hosted by the third and fourth placed teams). The winners then face the top two teams in the semi-finals, with the winners meeting in the final at the Stade de France in Saint-Denis.

The LNR uses a slightly different bonus points system from that used in most other rugby competitions. It trialled a new system in 2007–08 explicitly designed to prevent a losing team from earning more than one bonus point in a match, a system that also made it impossible for either team to earn a bonus point in a drawn match. LNR chose to continue with this system for subsequent seasons.

France's bonus point system operates as follows:

- 4 points for a win.
- 2 points for a draw.
- 1 bonus point for winning while scoring at least 3 more tries than the opponent. This replaces the standard bonus point for scoring 4 tries regardless of the match result.
- 1 bonus point for losing by 5 points (or fewer). The margin had been 7 points until being changed prior to the 2014–15 season.

== Table ==
2018–19 Top 14 Table
	Club	Played	Won	Drawn	Lost	Points For	Points Against	Points Diff.	Try Bonus	Losing Bonus	Points
1	Toulouse (CH)	26	21	2	3	820	508	+312	9	1	98
2	Clermont (RU)	26	16	3	7	828	535	+293	9	4	83
3	Lyon (SF)	26	17	1	8	683	525	+158	7	1	78
4	Racing (QF)	26	15	1	10	750	563	+187	8	4	74
5	La Rochelle (SF)	26	16	0	10	719	616	+103	6	1	71
6	Montpellier (QF)	26	14	1	11	659	546	+113	6	6	70
7	Castres	26	15	0	11	508	499	+9	4	5	69
8	Stade Français	26	14	0	12	583	579	+4	4	4	64
9	Toulon	26	12	0	14	572	542	+30	6	3	57
10	Bordeaux Bègles	26	12	1	13	618	711	–93	4	3	57
11	Pau	26	9	0	17	501	763	–262	2	5	43
12	Agen	26	8	1	17	431	654	–223	0	4	38
13	Grenoble (R)	26	5	2	19	448	691	–243	0	5	29
14	Perpignan (R)	26	2	0	24	433	821	–388	0	4	12
If teams are level at any stage, tiebreakers are applied in the following order: 1. Competition points earned in head-to-head matches 2. Points difference in head-to-head matches 3. Try differential in head-to-head matches 4. Points difference in all matches 5. Try differential in all matches 6. Points scored in all matches 7. Tries scored in all matches 8. Fewer matches forfeited 9. Classification in the previous Top 14 season
Green background (rows 1 and 2) receive semi-final play-off places and receive berths in the 2019–20 European Rugby Champions Cup. Blue background (rows 3 to 6) receive quarter-final play-off places, and receive berths in the Champions Cup. Plain background indicates teams that earn a place in the 2019–20 European Rugby Challenge Cup. Pink background (row 13) will be contest a play-off with the runners-up of the 2018–19 Rugby Pro D2 season for a place in the 2019–20 Top 14 season. Red background (row 14) will be relegated to Rugby Pro D2. Final table

== Relegation ==
Starting from the 2017–18 season forward, only the 14th placed team will be automatically relegated to Pro D2. The 13th placed team will face the runner-up of the Pro D2 play-off, with the winner of that play-off taking up the final place in Top 14 for the following season.

== Fixtures and results ==
=== Round 1 ===
25 August 2018
14:45

Perpignan	15–46	Stade Français (1 BP)
	Report

Stade Aimé Giral
Attendance: 14,466
Referee: Laurent Cardona

25 August 2018
17:15

(1 BP) Bordeaux Bègles	41–19	Pau
	Report

Stade Chaban-Delmas
Attendance: 17,126
Referee: Pierre Brousset

25 August 2018
17:15

Lyon	16–16	Toulouse
	Report

Matmut Stadium de Gerland
Attendance: 13,047
Referee: Alexandre Ruiz

25 August 2018
17:15

La Rochelle	28–21	Grenoble
	Report

Stade Marcel-Deflandre
Attendance: 15,983
Referee: Jonathan Dufort

25 August 2018
17:15

(1 BP) Clermont	67–23	Agen
	Report

Stade Marcel-Michelin
Attendance: 16,528
Referee: Maxime Chalon

25 August 2018
20:45

Toulon	9–25	Racing (1 BP)
	Report

Stade Mayol
Attendance: 17,500
Referee: Romain Poite

26 August 2018
17:05

(1 BP) Montpellier	20–25	Castres
	Report

Altrad Stadium
Attendance: 11,000
Referee: Mathieu Raynal

=== Round 2 ===
1 September 2018
14:45

Pau	20–10	Toulon
	Report

Stade du Hameau
Attendance: 13,557
Referee: Pascal Gaüzère

1 September 2018
18:00

Castres	19–16	Lyon (1 BP)
	Report

Stade Pierre-Fabre
Attendance: 10,250
Referee: Adrien Descottes

1 September 2018
18:00

Stade Français	20–8	Bordeaux Bègles
	Report

Stade Jean-Bouin
Attendance: 12,366
Referee: Vincent Blasco-Baqué

1 September 2018
18:00

Montpellier	36–14	La Rochelle
	Report

Altrad Stadium
Attendance: 10,000
Referee: Thomas Charabas

1 September 2018
20:45

(1 BP) Grenoble	20–23	Toulouse
	Report

Stade des Alpes
Attendance: 13,856
Referee: Cyril Lafon

2 September 2018
12:30

Agen	25–23	Perpignan (1 BP)
	Report

Stade Armandie
Attendance: 7,761
Referee: Julien Castaignède

2 September 2018
16:50

Racing	17–40	Clermont
	Report

Paris La Défense Arena
Attendance: 19,152
Referee: Mathieu Raynal

=== Round 3 ===
8 September 2018
14:45

Bordeaux Bègles	9–9	Montpellier
	Report

Stade Chaban-Delmas
Attendance: 15,567
Referee: Ludovic Cayre

8 September 2018
17:00

Toulouse	33–26	La Rochelle
	Report

Stade Ernest-Wallon
Attendance: 14,526
Referee: Maxime Chalon

8 September 2018
19:00

Perpignan	16–22	Lyon
	Report

Stade Aimé Giral
Attendance: 11,066
Referee: Jonathan Dufort

8 September 2018
19:00

(1 BP) Racing	59–7	Agen
	Report

Paris La Défense Arena
Attendance: 9,657
Referee: Tual Trainini

8 September 2018
21:00

(1 BP) Clermont	42–20	Stade Français
	Report

Stade Marcel-Michelin
Attendance: 18,388
Referee: Romain Poite

9 September 2018
12:30

(1 BP) Grenoble	21–24	Pau
	Report

Stade des Alpes
Attendance: 12,000
Referee: Alexandre Ruiz

9 September 2018
16:50

Toulon	28–27	Castres (1 BP)
	Report

Stade Mayol
Attendance: 13,136
Referee: Laurent Cardona

=== Round 4 ===
15 September 2018
14:45

(1 BP) Lyon	55–13	Montpellier
	Report

Matmut Stadium de Gerland
Attendance: 11,298
Referee: Romain Poite

15 September 2018
18:00

(1 BP) Pau	23–27	Clermont
	Report

Stade du Hameau
Attendance: 14,467
Referee: Thomas Charabas

15 September 2018
18:00

(1 BP) Castres	29–13	Grenoble
	Report

Stade Pierre-Fabre
Attendance: 9,700
Referee: Julien Castaignède

15 September 2018
18:00

Agen	22–17	Bordeaux Bègles (1 BP)
	Report

Stade Armandie
Attendance: 8,288
Referee: Cyril Lafon

15 September 2018
20:45

Toulouse	30–17	Racing
	Report

Stade Ernest-Wallon
Attendance: 14,200
Referee: Adrien Descottes

16 September 2018
12:30

(1 BP) La Rochelle	37–10	Perpignan
	Report

Stade Marcel-Deflandre
Attendance: 16,000
Referee: Pierre Brousset

16 September 2018
16:50

(1 BP) Stade Français	37–10	Toulon
	Report

Stade Jean-Bouin
Attendance: 13,478
Referee: Mathieu Raynal

=== Round 5 ===
22 September 2018
14:45

Bordeaux Bègles	23–19	Clermont (1 BP)
	Report

Stade Chaban-Delmas
Attendance: 20,132
Referee: Pascal Gaüzère

22 September 2018
18:00

La Rochelle	30–13	Lyon
	Report

Stade Marcel-Deflandre
Attendance: 16,000
Referee: Tual Trainini

22 September 2018
18:00

(1 BP) Toulon	33–3	Agen
	Report

Stade Mayol
Attendance: 13,395
Referee: Vincent Blasco-Baqué

22 September 2018
18:00

Grenoble	31–22	Perpignan
	Report

Stade des Alpes
Attendance: 13,000
Referee: Jérôme Garcès

22 September 2018
20:45

Racing	27–11	Castres
	Report

Paris La Défense Arena
Attendance: 15,102
Referee: Maxime Chalon

23 September 2018
12:30

Pau	13–25	Stade Français
	Report

Stade du Hameau
Attendance: 12,400
Referee: Ludovic Cayre

23 September 2018
16:50

(1 BP) Montpellier	66–15	Toulouse
	Report

Altrad Stadium
Attendance: 11,652
Referee: Alexandre Ruiz

=== Round 6 ===
29 September 2018
15:10

(1 BP) Toulouse	22–26	Castres
	Report

Stade Ernest-Wallon
Attendance: 18,838
Referee: Romain Poite

29 September 2018
18:00

(1 BP) Perpignan	20–23	Montpellier
	Report

Stade Aimé Giral
Attendance: 11,466
Referee: Tual Trainini

29 September 2018
18:00

(1 BP) Agen	25–28	Pau
	Report

Stade Armandie
Attendance: 8,205
Referee: Laurent Cardona

29 September 2018
18:00

(1 BP) Bordeaux Bègles	34–22	La Rochelle
	Report

Matmut Atlantique
Attendance: 25,200
Referee: Maxime Chalon

29 September 2018
18:00

(1 BP) Lyon	34–6	Grenoble
	Report

Matmut Stadium de Gerland
Attendance: 14,875
Referee: Pascal Gauzere

29 September 2018
20:45

(1 BP) Clermont	28–8	Toulon
	Report

Stade Marcel-Michelin
Attendance: 18,756
Referee: Adrien Descottes

30 September 2018
16:50

(1 BP) Stade Français	16–17	Racing
	Report

Stade Jean-Bouin
Attendance: 15,500
Referee: Alexandre Ruiz

=== Round 7 ===
6 October 2018
14:45

La Rochelle	16–12	Clermont (1 BP)
	Report

Stade Marcel-Deflandre
Attendance: 16,000
Referee: Ludovic Cayre

6 October 2018
18:00

Pau	12–9	Perpignan (1 BP)
	Report

Stade du Hameau
Attendance: 12,267
Referee: Cyril Lafon

6 October 2018
18:00

Racing	13–19	Lyon
	Report

Paris La Défense Arena
Attendance: 15,123
Referee: Thomas Charabas

6 October 2018
18:00

Grenoble	28–25	Bordeaux Bègles (1 BP)
	Report

Stade des Alpes
Attendance: 12,000
Referee: Jonathan Dufort

6 October 2018
20:45

Toulouse	10–0	Agen
	Report

Stade Ernest-Wallon
Attendance: 14,213
Referee: Julien Castaignède

7 October 2018
12:30

(1 BP) Castres	9–14	Stade Français
	Report

Stade Pierre-Fabre
Attendance: 10,325
Referee: Pascal Gauzere

7 October 2018
16:50

(1 BP) Montpellier	29–17	Toulon
	Report

Altrad Stadium
Attendance: 12,537
Referee: Pierre Brousset

=== Round 8 ===
27 October 2018
14:45

(1 BP) Clermont	41–6	Castres
	Report

Stade Marcel-Michelin
Attendance: 18,653
Referee: Mathieu Raynal

27 October 2018
18:00

Agen	9–9	Grenoble
	Report

Stade Armandie
Attendance: 7,706
Referee: Alexandre Ruiz

27 October 2018
18:00

Racing	48–28	Pau
	Report

Paris La Défense Arena
Attendance: 12,565
Referee: Tual Trainini

27 October 2018
18:00

Perpignan	18–36	Toulouse (1 BP)
	Report

Stade Aimé Giral
Attendance: 13,266
Referee: Thomas Charabas

27 October 2018
20:45

Stade Français	25–20	Montpellier (1 BP)
	Report

Stade Jean-Bouin
Attendance: 9,442
Referee: Jérôme Garcès

28 October 2018
12:30

(1 BP) Bordeaux Bègles	35–13	Lyon
	Report

Stade Chaban-Delmas
Attendance: 13,273
Referee: Vincent Blasco-Baqué

28 October 2018
16:50

(1 BP) Toulon	9–13	La Rochelle
	Report

Stade Mayol
Attendance: 12,970
Referee: Pascal Gaüzère

=== Round 9 ===
3 November 2018
14:45

Grenoble	27–27	Clermont
	Report

Stade des Alpes
Attendance: 15,551
Referee: Pierre Brousset

3 November 2018
18:45

La Rochelle	33–29	Agen (1 BP)
	Report

Stade Marcel-Deflandre
Attendance: 16,000
Referee: Thomas Charabas

3 November 2018
18:45

(1 BP) Castres	37–10	Pau
	Report

Stade Pierre-Fabre
Attendance: 10,027
Referee: Jonathan Dufort

3 November 2018
18:45

Toulon	26–16	Perpignan
	Report

Stade Mayol
Attendance: 12,988
Referee: Maxime Chalon

3 November 2018
18:45

(1 BP) Toulouse	40–0	Bordeaux Bègles
	Report

Stade Ernest-Wallon
Attendance: 14,372
Referee: Ludovic Cayre

4 November 2018
12:30

(1 BP) Lyon	41–6	Stade Français
	Report

Matmut Stadium de Gerland
Attendance: 13,197
Referee: Adrien Descottes

4 November 2018
16:50

Montpellier	13–27	Racing
	Report

Altrad Stadium
Attendance: 10,500
Referee: Pascal Gaüzère

=== Round 10 ===
24 November 2018
14:45

Bordeaux Bègles	36–25	Toulon
	Report

Stade Chaban-Delmas
Attendance: 19,848
Referee: Jonathan Dufort

24 November 2018
18:00

(1 BP) Agen	15–18	Montpellier
	Report

Stade Armandie
Attendance: 6,492
Referee: Cyril Lafon

24 November 2018
18:00

(1 BP) Pau	13–15	Toulouse
	Report

Stade du Hameau
Attendance: 16,652
Referee: Laurent Cardona

24 November 2018
18:00

Racing	24–23	Grenoble (1 BP)
	Report

Paris La Défense Arena
Attendance: 9,000
Referee: Julien Castagnède

24 November 2018
18:00

(1 BP) Perpignan	12–16	Castres
	Report

Stade Aimé Giral
Attendance: 11,466
Referee: Adrien Descottes

25 November 2018
12:30

(1 BP) Stade Français	12–14	La Rochelle
	Report

Stade Jean-Bouin
Attendance: 9,575
Referee: Vincent Blasco-Baqué

25 November 2018
16:50

(1 BP) Clermont	31–11	Lyon
	Report

Stade Marcel-Michelin
Attendance: 17,848
Referee: Tual Trainini

=== Round 11 ===
1 December 2018
14:45

(1 BP) Montpellier	23–28	Clermont
	Report

Altrad Stadium
Attendance: 13,387
Referee: Romain Poite

1 December 2018
18:05

(1 BP) Castres	13–16	Agen
	Report

Stade Pierre-Fabre
Attendance: 10,365
Referee: Jérôme Garcès

1 December 2018
18:05

La Rochelle	16–11	Racing (1 BP)
	Report

Stade Marcel-Deflandre
Attendance: 16,000
Referee: Pierre Brousset

1 December 2018
18:05

(1 BP) Lyon	30–10	Pau
	Report

Matmut Stadium de Gerland
Attendance: 11,557
Referee: Cédric Marchat

1 December 2018
20:45

(1 BP) Toulon	22–3	Grenoble
	Report

Stade Mayol
Attendance: 13,804
Referee: Mathieu Raynal

2 December 2018
12:30

Perpignan	11–22	Bordeaux Bègles
	Report

Stade Aimé Giral
Attendance: 11,385
Referee: Alexandre Ruiz

2 December 2018
16:50

(1 BP) Toulouse	49–20	Stade Français
	Report

Stade Ernest-Wallon
Attendance: 17,729
Referee: Cyril Lafon

=== Round 12 ===
22 December 2018
14:30

Agen	6–19	Stade Français
	Report

Stade Armandie
Attendance: 7,602
Referee: Pierre Brousset

22 December 2018
16:30

(1 BP) Toulon	40–7	Lyon
	Report

Stade Mayol
Attendance: 14,248
Referee: Alexandre Ruiz

22 December 2018
18:30

Grenoble	17–16	Montpellier (1 BP)
	Report

Stade des Alpes
Attendance: 12,000
Referee: Thomas Charabas

22 December 2018
18:30

(1 BP) Pau	23–28	La Rochelle
	Report

Stade du Hameau
Attendance: 14,897
Referee: Mathieu Raynel

22 December 2018
18:30

(1 BP) Racing	64–28	Perpignan
	Report

Paris La Défense Arena
Attendance: 14,352
Referee: Hervé Lasausa Lespy Labaylette

23 December 2018
16:50

Castres	13–32	Bordeaux Bègles
	Report

Stade Pierre-Fabre
Attendance: 11,023
Referee: Tua Trainini

23 December 2018
21:00

Clermont	20–20	Toulouse
	Report

Stade Marcel-Michelin
Attendance: 18,761
Referee: Jérôme Garcès

=== Round 13 ===
29 December 2018
14:30

(1 BP) Lyon	52–20	Agen
	Report

Matmut Stadium de Gerland
Attendance: 13,644
Referee: Maxime Chalon

29 December 2018
16:30

Stade Français	23–20	Grenoble (1 BP)
	Report

Stade Jean-Bouin
Attendance: 6,840
Referee: Laurent Cardona

29 December 2018
18:30

(1 BP) La Rochelle	53–27	Castres
	Report

Stade Marcel-Deflandre
Attendance: 16,000
Referee: Romain Poite

29 December 2018
21:00

Perpignan	16–37	Clermont (1 BP)
	Report

Stade Aimé Giral
Attendance: 12,066
Referee: Pascal Gaüzère

30 December 2018
16:00

(1 BP) Montpellier	41–13	Pau
	Report

Altrad Stadium
Attendance: 9,464
Referee: Julien Castaignede

30 December 2018
18:00

(1 BP) Bordeaux Bègles	40–7	Racing
	Report

Stade Chaban-Delmas
Attendance: 26,242
Referee: Vincent Blasco-Baqué

30 December 2018
20:45

(1 BP) Toulouse	39–0	Toulon
	Report

Stadium Municipal
Attendance: 32,721
Referee: Adrien Descottes

=== Round 14 ===
5 January 2019
14:30

(1 BP) Stade Français	27–8	Perpignan
	Report

Stade Jean-Bouin
Attendance: 7,150
Referee: Cédric Marchat

5 January 2019
16:30

Grenoble	6–16	Castres
	Report

Stade des Alpes
Attendance: 12,000
Referee: Jonathan Dufort

5 January 2019
16:30

Montpellier	14–25	Lyon
	Report

Altrad Stadium
Attendance: 8,500
Referee: Jérôme Garces

5 January 2019
16:30

(1 BP) Pau	40–23	Bordeaux Bègles
	Report

Stade du Hameau
Attendance: 12,950
Referee: Pierre Brousset

5 January 2019
19:00

Agen	20–27	Toulouse
	Report

Stade Armandie
Attendance: 10,569
Referee: Alexandre Ruiz

5 January 2019
21:00

Racing	22–13	Toulon
	Report

Paris La Défense Arena
Attendance: 17,000
Referee: Mathieu Raynal

6 January 2019
17:00

Clermont	44–19	La Rochelle
	Report

Stade Marcel-Michelin
Attendance: 18,036
Referee: Cyril Lafon

=== Round 15 ===
26 January 2019
15:00

Castres	24–16	Clermont
	Report

Stade Pierre-Fabre
Attendance: 11,023
Referee: Jérôme Garces

26 January 2019
18:00

Bordeaux Bègles	25–17	Agen
	Report

Stade Chaban-Delmas
Attendance: 17,054
Referee: Adrien Descottes

26 January 2019
18:00

Perpignan	24–30	Pau
	Report

Stade Aimé Giral
Attendance: 10,066
Referee: Laurent Cardona

26 January 2019
18:00

La Rochelle	27–25	Montpellier (1 BP)
	Report

Stade Marcel-Deflandre
Attendance: 16,000
Referee: Tual Trainini

26 January 2019
20:45

Lyon	32–11	Racing
	Report

Matmut Stadium de Gerland
Attendance: 12,557
Referee: Thomas Charabas

27 January 2019
12:30

(1 BP) Toulouse	29–16	Grenoble
	Report

Stade Ernest-Wallon
Attendance: 10,767
Referee: Ludovic Cayre

27 January 2019
16:50

Toulon	33–30	Stade Français (1 BP)
	Report

Stade Mayol
Attendance: 14,000
Referee: Romain Poite

=== Round 16 ===
16 February 2019
14:45

Clermont	40–20	Bordeaux Bègles
	Report

Stade Marcel-Michelin
Attendance: 17,430
Referee: Alexandre Ruiz

16 February 2019
18:00

Montpellier	10–28	Perpignan
	Report

Altrad Stadium
Attendance: 8,500
Referee: Jonathan Dufort

16 February 2019
18:00

(1 BP) Pau	9–14	Castres
	Report

Stade du Hameau
Attendance: 12,887
Referee: Maxime Chalon

16 February 2019
18:00

Stade Français	13–24	Lyon
	Report

Stade Jean-Bouin
Attendance: 7,643
Referee: Mathieu Raynal

16 February 2019
20:45

Agen	19–10	Toulon
	Report

Stade Armandie
Attendance: 8,498
Referee: Pascal Gaüzère

17 February 2019
12:30

Grenoble	21–28	La Rochelle (1 BP)
	Report

Stade des Alpes
Attendance: 12,000
Referee: Pierre Brousset

17 February 2019
16:50

(1 BP) Racing	29–34	Toulouse
	Report

Paris La Défense Arena
Attendance: 25,305
Referee: Romain Poite

=== Round 17 ===
23 February 2019
18:00

(1 BP) Bordeaux Bègles	47–31	Grenoble
	Report

Stade Chaban-Delmas
Attendance: 14,837
Referee: Sébastien Minery

23 February 2019
18:00

Perpignan	13–20	Agen
	Report

Stade Aimé Giral
Attendance: 12,166
Referee: Vincent Blasco-Baqué

23 February 2019
18:00

(1 BP) Toulon	38–11	Pau
	Report

Stade Mayol
Attendance: 12,585
Referee: Cédric Marchat

23 February 2019
18:00

Toulouse	27–14	Montpellier
	Report

Stade Ernest-Wallon
Attendance: 15,839
Referee: Laurent Cardona

23 February 2019
20:45

La Rochelle	14–27	Stade Français
	Report

Stade Marcel-Deflandre
Attendance: 16,000
Referee: Adrien Descottes

24 February 2019
12:30

Castres	18–9	Racing
	Report

Stade Pierre-Fabre
Attendance: 11,008
Referee: Tual Trainini

24 February 2019
16:50

Lyon	19–13	Clermont (1 BP)
	Report

Matmut Stadium de Gerland
Attendance: 18,016
Referee: Ludovic Cayre

=== Round 18 ===
2 March 2019
14:45

(1 BP) Racing	50–14	La Rochelle
	Report

Paris La Défense Arena
Attendance: 15,046
Referee: Jonathan Dufort

2 March 2019
18:00

Pau	27–17	Agen
	Report

Stade du Hameau
Attendance: 11,857
Referee: Thomas Charabas

2 March 2019
18:00

(1 BP) Clermont	52–17	Grenoble
	Report

Stade Marcel-Michelin
Attendance: 15,579
Referee: Vincent Blasco-Baqué

2 March 2019
18:00

(1 BP) Montpellier	37–10	Bordeaux Bègles
	Report

Altrad Stadium
Attendance: 8,100
Referee: Maxime Chalon

2 March 2019
20:45

Lyon	15–23	Castres
	Report

Matmut Stadium de Gerland
Attendance: 13,015
Referee: Adrien Descottes

3 March 2019
12:30

Perpignan	11–24	Toulon
	Report

Stade Aimé Giral
Attendance: 11,466
Referee: Alexandre Ruiz

3 March 2019
16:50

Stade Français	9–28	Toulouse (1 BP)
	Report

Stade Jean-Bouin
Attendance: 13,206
Referee: Jérôme Garcès

=== Round 19 ===
16 March 2019
17:00

(1 BP) Toulon	18–21	Montpellier
	Report

Stade Mayol
Attendance: 13,283
Referee: Cyril Lafon

16 March 2019
18:00

Agen	19–7	La Rochelle
	Report

Stade Armandie
Attendance: 8,490
Referee: Romain Poite

16 March 2019
18:00

(1 BP) Castres	36–17	Perpignan
	Report

Stade Pierre-Fabre
Attendance: 10,857
Referee: Sébastien Minery

16 March 2019
18:00

Grenoble	16–34	Racing (1 BP)
	Report

Stade des Alpes
Attendance: 12,000
Referee: Laurent Cardona

16 March 2019
20:45

Bordeaux Bègles	26–12	Stade Français
	Report

Stade Chaban-Delmas
Attendance: 18,423
Referee: Pascal Gaüzère

17 March 2019
12:30

Clermont	27–14	Pau
	Report

Stade Marcel-Michelin
Attendance: 16,001
Referee: Pierre Brousset

17 March 2019
16:50

(1 BP) Toulouse	53–21	Lyon
	Report

Stade Ernest-Wallon
Attendance: 15,398
Referee: Mathieu Raynal

=== Round 20 ===
23 March 2019
14:45

Lyon	42–33	Toulon
	Report

Matmut Stadium de Gerland
Attendance: 14,079
Referee: Vincent Blasco-Baqué

23 March 2019
16:45

(1 BP) Stade Français	32–16	Castres
	Report

Stade Jean-Bouin
Attendance: 8,661
Referee: Alexandre Ruiz

23 March 2019
18:45

Perpignan	22–16	Grenoble
	Report

Stade Aimé Giral
Attendance: 10,038
Referee: Cédric Marchat

23 March 2019
18:45

Pau	15–24	Montpellier
	Report

Stade du Hameau
Attendance: 11,823
Referee: Pascal Gaüzère

23 March 2019
20:45

Agen	13–28	Clermont
	Report

Stade Armandie
Attendance: 9,896
Referee: Mathieu Raynal

24 March 2019
16:50

(1 BP) Racing	45–27	Bordeaux Bègles
	Report

Paris La Défense Arena
Attendance: 14,166
Referee: Romain Poite

24 March 2019
21:00

(1 BP) La Rochelle	19–23	Toulouse
	Report

Stade Marcel-Deflandre
Attendance: 16,000
Referee: Ludovic Cayre

=== Round 21 ===
6 April 2019
14:45

Toulon	25–10	Toulouse
	Report

Stade Vélodrome, Marseille
Attendance: 43,089
Referee: Jérôme Garcès

6 April 2019
18:00

Bordeaux Bègles	31–22	Perpignan
	Report

Stade Chaban-Delmas
Attendance: 20,168
Referee: Maxime Chalon

6 April 2019
18:00

Grenoble	21–17	Stade Français (1 BP)
	Report

Stade des Alpes
Attendance: 12,000
Referee: Sébastien Minery

6 April 2019
18:00

(1 BP) Montpellier	33–17	Agen
	Report

Altrad Stadium
Attendance: 8,500
Referee: Adrien Descottes

6 April 2019
20:45

Castres	25–11	La Rochelle
	Report

Stade Pierre-Fabre
Attendance: 10,429
Referee: Cyril Lafon

7 April 2019
12:30

(1 BP) Pau	24–27	Lyon
	Report

Stade du Hameau
Attendance: 11,324
Referee: Tual Trainini

7 April 2019
16:50

Clermont	31–31	Racing
	Report

Stade Marcel-Michelin
Attendance: 18,730
Referee: Thomas Charabas

=== Round 22 ===
13 April 2019
14:45

(1 BP) Bordeaux Bègles	12–16	Castres
	Report

Stade Chaban-Delmas
Attendance: 30,127
Referee: Ludovic Cayre

13 April 2019
18:00

(1 BP) La Rochelle	71–21	Pau
	Report

Stade Marcel-Deflandre
Attendance: 16,000
Referee: Mathieu Raynal

13 April 2019
18:00

(1 BP) Lyon	47–9	Perpignan
	Report

Matmut Stadium de Gerland
Attendance: 15,037
Referee: Jonathan Dufort

13 April 2019
18:00

Stade Français	25–22	Agen (1 BP)
	Report

Stade Jean-Bouin
Attendance: 6,100
Referee: Laurent Cardona

13 April 2019
20:45

Grenoble	19–18	Toulon (1 BP)
	Report

Stade des Alpes
Attendance: 15,000
Referee: Pierre Brousset

14 April 2019
12:30

Racing	26–25	Montpellier (1 BP)
	Report

Paris La Défense Arena
Attendance: 15,383
Referee: Alexandre Ruiz

14 April 2019
16:50

Toulouse	47 – 44	Clermont (1 BP)
	Report

Stadium de Toulouse
Attendance: 32,700
Referee: Romain Poite

=== Round 23 ===
27 April 2019
14:45

Pau	29–27	Racing (1 BP)
	Report

Stade du Hameau
Attendance: 13,024
Referee: Vincent Blasco-Baqué

27 April 2019
16:45

(1 BP) Castres	20–21	Toulouse
	Report

Stade Pierre-Fabre
Attendance: 12,500
Referee: Adrien Descottes

27 April 2019
18:45

Agen	25–15	Lyon
	Report

Stade Armandie
Attendance: 7,305
Referee: Pascal Gaüzère

27 April 2019
18:45

(1 BP) Montpellier	47–12	Grenoble
	Report

Altrad Stadium
Attendance: 8,500
Referee: Julien Castaignède

27 April 2019
20:45

Perpignan	29–49	La Rochelle (1 BP)
	Report

Stade Aimé Giral
Attendance: 11,023
Referee: Tual Trainini

- Perpignan are relegated.

28 April 2019
12:30

(1 BP) Toulon	45–17	Bordeaux Bègles
	Report

Stade Mayol
Attendance: 15,836
Referee: Jonathan Dufort

28 April 2019
16:50

Stade Français	25–41	Clermont (1 BP)
	Report

Stade Jean-Bouin
Attendance: 14,228
Referee: Ludovic Cayre

=== Round 24 ===
4 May 2019
14:45

(1 BP) Toulouse	83–6	Pau
	Report

Stade Ernest-Wallon
Attendance: 18,500
Referee: Maxime Chalon

4 May 2019
18:00

Grenoble	11–29	Agen
	Report

Stade des Alpes
Attendance: 15,000
Referee: Romain Poite

4 May 2019
18:00

(1 BP) Clermont	35–13	Perpignan
	Report

Stade Marcel-Michelin
Attendance: 18,565
Referee: Alexandre Ruiz

4 May 2019
18:00

(1 BP) Castres	9–12	Montpellier
	Report

Stade Pierre-Fabre
Attendance: 11,613
Referee: Mathieu Raynal

4 May 2019
20:45

La Rochelle	30–21	Toulon
	Report

Stade Marcel-Deflandre
Attendance: 16,000
Referee: Cédric Marchat

5 May 2019
12:30

(1 BP) Lyon	34–10	Bordeaux Bègles
	Report

Matmut Stadium de Gerland
Attendance: 13,527
Referee: Sébastien Minery

5 May 2019
16:50

(1 BP) Racing	23–27	Stade Français
	Report

Paris La Défense Arena
Attendance: 20,866
Referee: Cyril Lafon

=== Round 25 ===
18 May 2019
15:00

Agen	10–17	Castres
	Report

Stade Armandie
Attendance: 9,803
Referee: Jérôme Garcès

18 May 2019
15:00

(1 BP) Pau	22–0	Grenoble
	Report

Stade du Hameau
Attendance: 11,467
Referee: Laurent Cardona

18 May 2019
15:00

Perpignan	14–52	Racing (1 BP)
	Report

Stade Aimé Giral
Attendance: 10,666
Referee: Jonathan Dufort

18 May 2019
21:00

Lyon	29–19	La Rochelle
	Report

Matmut Stadium de Gerland
Attendance: 14,513
Referee: Romain Poite

19 May 2019
12:30

(1 BP) Montpellier	42–25	Stade Français
	Report

Altrad Stadium
Attendance: 13,500
Referee: Pascal Gaüzère

19 May 2019
16:50

Bordeaux Bègles	36–43	Toulouse
	Report

Stade Chaban-Delmas
Attendance: 27,318
Referee: Tual Trainini

19 May 2019
21:00

(1 BP) Toulon	32–11	Clermont
	Report

Stade Mayol
Attendance: 14,985
Referee: Vincent Blasco Baqué

=== Round 26 ===
25 May 2019
16:30

Agen	3–35	Racing (1 BP)
	Report

Stade Armandie
Attendance: 9,298
Referee: Pierre Brousset

25 May 2019
16:30

Castres	16–25	Toulon
	Report

Stade Pierre-Fabre
Attendance: 11,874
Referee: Thomas Charabas

25 May 2019
16:30

Clermont (1 BP)	27–28	Montpellier
	Report

Stade Marcel-Michelin
Attendance: 18,783
Referee: Mathieu Raynal

25 May 2019
16:30

Grenoble (1 BP)	23–24	Lyon
	Report

Stade des Alpes
Attendance: 10,000
Referee: Alexandre Ruiz

25 May 2019
16:30

La Rochelle (1 BP)	81–12	Bordeaux Bègles
	Report

Stade Marcel-Deflandre
Attendance: 16,000
Referee: Maxime Chalon

25 May 2019
16:30

Stade Français	31–17	Pau
	Report

Stade Jean-Bouin
Attendance: 9,623
Referee: Julien Castaignède

25 May 2019
16:30

Toulouse (1 BP)	47–7	Perpignan
	Report

Stade Ernest-Wallon
Attendance: 18,838
Referee: Cyril Lafon

== Relegation playoff ==
The team finishing in 13th place faces the runner-up of the Pro D2, with the winner of this match playing in the 2019–20 Top 14 and the loser in the 2019–20 Pro D2.

2 June 2019
15:15

Brive	28–22	Grenoble
Try: Penalty try 22' m Romanet 35' c Marques 44' c Giorgadze 76' c Con: Laranjeira (1/2) 35'; Olding (2/2) 44', 76'	Report	Try: Guillemin 80' c Con: Pourteau (1/1) 80'; Pen: Germain (5/5) 4', 15', 27', 33', 66'

Stade Amédée-Domenech, Brive
Attendance: 16,000
Referee: Tual Trainini

Brive won and were promoted to Top 14, while Grenoble were relegated to Pro D2.

== Playoffs ==
Semi-final Qualifiers
4	Racing	13
5	La Rochelle	19
3	Lyon	21
6	Montpellier	16

Semi-finals
1	Toulouse	20
5	La Rochelle	6
2	Clermont	33
3	Lyon	13

Final
1	Toulouse	24
2	Clermont	18

=== Semi-final Qualifiers ===
31 May 2019
21:00

Racing (4)	13–19	La Rochelle (5)
Try: Nakarawa 67' c Con: Iribaren (1/1) 67'; Pen: Machenaud (1/1) 40'; Iribaren (1/1) 73'	Report	Try: Retière 52' c Con: West (1/1) 52'; Pen: West (4/4) 11', 16', 30', 38'

Stade Olympique Yves-du-Manoir, Colombes (Note: Racing would play their semi-final qualifier game at the 14,000 capacity Stade Olympique Yves-du-Manoir due to a concert behind held at the Paris La Défense Arena.)
Attendance: 11,498
Referee: Mathieu Raynal

1 June 2019
17:00

Lyon (3)	21–16	Montpellier (6)
Try: Barassi 13' m Ngatai 69' c Con: Wisniewski (1/2) 69'; Pen: Wisniewski (3/3) 21', 40', 53'	Report	Try: Cruden 4' c Con: Paillaugue (1/1) 4'; Pen: Paillaugue (2/2) 11', 29'; Cruden (1/1) 61'

Matmut Stadium de Gerland
Attendance: 17,002
Referee: Alexandre Ruiz

=== Semi-finals ===
8 June 2019
21:00

Toulouse (1)	20–6	La Rochelle (5)
Try: Guitoune 13' c Bézy 60' m Kolbe 65' m Con: Ramos (1/1) 13'; Pen: Bézy (1/1) 73'	Report	Pen: West (2/2) 22', 27'

Matmut Atlantique, Bordeaux
Attendance: 42,071
Referee: Pascal Gaüzère

9 June 2019
16:30

Clermont (2)	33–13	Lyon (3)
Try: Penaud 31' c Raka 53' c Moala 80' c Con: Laidlaw (2/2) 31', 53'; Lopez (1/1) 80'; Pen: Laidlaw (4/4) 14', 25', 29', 75'	Report	Try: Gill 10' m Fourie 68' m Pen: Wisniewski (1/1) 20'

Matmut Atlantique, Bordeaux
Attendance: 42,042
Referee: Romain Poite

=== Final ===
15 June 2019
21:00

Toulouse (1)	24–18	Clermont (2)
Try: Huget (2) 29' m, 55' c Con: Ramos (1/2) 56'; Pen: Ramos (4/4) 9', 18', 48', 65'	Report	Pen: Laidlaw (5/5) 1', 14', 34', 52', 60'; Lopez (1/1) 73'

Stade de France, Saint-Denis
Attendance: 79,786
Referee: Jérôme Garcès

FB	15	(South Africa) Cheslin Kolbe
RW	14	(France) Yoann Huget		(substituted off) 75'
OC	13	(France) Sofiane Guitoune
IC	12	(New Zealand) Pita Ahki	(substituted off) 75'
LW	11	(France) Maxime Médard	(substituted off) 60'	(substituted on) 75'
FH	10	(France) Thomas Ramos
SH	9	(France) Antoine Dupont
N8	8	(New Zealand) Jerome Kaino (c)	(substituted off) 60'
OF	7	(France) François Cros
BF	6	(South Africa) Rynhardt Elstadt
RL	5	(Samoa) Joe Tekori	(substituted off) 60'
LL	4	(Australia) Richie Arnold	(substituted off) 43'
TP	3	(New Zealand) Charlie Faumuina	(substituted off) 48'	(substituted on) 75'
HK	2	(France) Péato Mauvaka	(substituted off) 62'
LP	1	(France) Cyril Baille	(substituted off) 51'	(substituted on) 77'
Substitutions:
HK	16	(France) Guillaume Marchand	(substituted on) 62'
PR	17	(France) Clément Castets	(substituted on) 51'	(substituted off) 77'
BR	18	(Samoa) Piula Faʻasalele	(substituted on) 60'
BR	19	(France) Selevasio Tolofua	(substituted on) 60'
LK	20	(Scotland) Richie Gray	(substituted on) 43'
SH	21	(France) Sébastien Bézy	(substituted on) 60'
FH	22	(France) Romain Ntamack	(substituted on) 75'
PR	23	(South Africa) Maks van Dyk	(substituted on) 48'	(substituted off) 75'
Coach:
(France) Ugo Mola

FB	15	(New Zealand) Isaia Toeava
RW	14	(France) Damian Penaud
OC	13	(New Zealand) George Moala	(substituted off) 75'
IC	12	(France) Wesley Fofana
LW	11	(France) Alivereti Raka	(substituted off) 60'
FH	10	(France) Camille Lopez
SH	9	(Scotland) Greig Laidlaw	(substituted off) 61'
N8	8	(New Zealand) Fritz Lee (c)
OF	7	(France) Alexandre Lapandry	(substituted off) 30'
BF	6	(France) Judicaël Cancoriet
RL	5	(France) Sébastien Vahaamahina		(substituted off) 78'
LL	4	(Australia) Sitaleki Timani	(substituted off) 55'	(substituted on) 78'
TP	3	(France) Rabah Slimani	(substituted off) 48'
HK	2	(France) Benjamin Kayser	(substituted off) 48'
LP	1	(France) Étienne Falgoux	(substituted off) 53'
Substitutions:
HK	16	(Australia) John Ulugia	(substituted on) 48'
PR	17	(Tonga) Loni Uhila	(substituted on) 53'
BR	18	(Fiji) Peceli Yato	(substituted on) 30'
LK	19	(France) Paul Jedrasiak	(substituted on) 55'
SH	20	(France) Charlie Cassang	(substituted on) 61'
CE	21	(Samoa) Tim Nanai-Williams	(substituted on) 60'
CE	22	(Fiji) Apisai Naqalevu	(substituted on) 75'
PR	23	(Georgia (country)) Davit Zirakashvili	(substituted on) 48'
Coach:
(France) Franck Azéma

== Leading scorers ==
Note: Flags to the left of player names indicate national team as has been defined under World Rugby eligibility rules, or primary nationality for players who have not yet earned international senior caps. Players may hold one or more non-WR nationalities.

=== Top points scorers ===
As of 15 June 2019

Rank	Player	Club	Points
1	(New Zealand) Ihaia West	La Rochelle	257
2	(France) Thomas Ramos	Toulouse	255
3	(France) Jonathan Wisniewski	Lyon	250
4	(Argentina) Benjamín Urdapilleta	Castres	224
5	(France) Gaëtan Germain	Grenoble	223
6	(Scotland) Greig Laidlaw	Clermont	205
7	(France) Baptiste Serin	Bordeaux Bègles	181
8	(New Zealand) Colin Slade	Pau	153
9	(France) Benoît Paillaugue	Montpellier	147
10	(Australia) Jake McIntyre	Agen	146

=== Top try scorers ===
As of 15 June 2019

Rank	Player	Club	Tries
1	(France) Virimi Vakatawa	Racing	13
2	(France) Sofiane Guitoune	Toulouse	12
3	(Ireland) Simon Zebo	Racing	11
4	(France) Arthur Bonneval	Toulouse	10
4	(New Zealand) Charlie Ngatai	Lyon	10
4	(Fiji) Peceli Yato	Clermont	10
5	(France) Gaël Fickou	Stade Français	9
5	(France) Yoann Huget	Toulouse	9
5	(Argentina) Juan Imhoff	Racing	9
5	(New Zealand) George Moala	Clermont	9
5	(France) Damian Penaud	Clermont	9
5	(France) Louis Picamoles	Montpellier	9
5	(France) Vincent Rattez	La Rochelle	9

== Attendances ==
- Attendances do not include the semi-finals or final as these are at neutral venues.

Club	Home Games	Total	Average	Highest	Lowest	% Capacity
Agen	13	109,913	8,455	10,569	6,492	60%
Bordeaux Bègles	13	265,315	20,409	30,127	13,273	58%
Castres	13	140,994	10,846	12,500	9,700	87%
Clermont	13	232,058	17,851	18,783	15,579	94%
Grenoble	13	166,407	12,801	15,551	10,000	64%
La Rochelle	13	207,983	15,999	16,000	15,983	100%
Lyon	14	195,364	13,955	18,016	11,298	56%
Montpellier	13	134,140	10,318	13,500	8,100	66%
Pau	13	169,572	13,044	16,652	11,324	71%
Perpignan	13	150,606	11,585	14,466	10,038	79%
Racing	14	214,215	15,301	25,305	9,000	53%
Stade Francais	13	133,812	10,293	15,500	6,100	51%
Toulon	13	211,819	16,294	43,089	12,585	76%
Toulouse	13	238,641	18,357	32,721	10,767	84%

== See also ==
- 2018–19 Rugby Pro D2 season
