= 2018–19 European Rugby Champions Cup pool stage =

- Season: 2018–19 European Rugby Champions Cup
- Date: 12 October 2018 – 20 January 2019

Qualifiers
- Seed 1: (England) Saracens
- Seed 2: (France) Racing 92
- Seed 3: (Ireland) Leinster
- Seed 4: (Scotland) Edinburgh
- Seed 5: (Ireland) Munster
- Seed 6: (Ireland) Ulster
- Seed 7: (France) Toulouse
- Seed 8: (Scotland) Glasgow Warriors

The 2018–19 European Rugby Champions Cup pool stage is the first stage of the 24th season of European club rugby union, and the fifth under the European Rugby Champions Cup format.

The competition involves twenty teams, across five pools of four teams, for eight quarter-final places – awarded to the five pool winners and the three top-ranked pool runners-up.

The pool stage began on the weekend of 12–14 October 2018, and ended following 6 rounds of games, on the weekend of 18–20 January 2019.

Locations
Locations of teams of the 2018–19 European Rugby Champions Cup group stage.
Brown: Pool 1; Red: Pool 2; Orange: Pool 3; Yellow: Pool 4; Green: Pool 5.

== Seeding ==
The twenty competing teams are seeded and split into four tiers, each containing five teams.

For the purpose of creating the tiers, clubs are ranked based on their domestic league performances and on their qualification for the knockout phases of their championships. For example, a losing quarter-finalist would be seeded below a losing semi-finalist, even if they finished above them in the regular season.

Rank	Top 14	Premiership	Pro14
1	(France) Castres	(England) Saracens	(Ireland) Leinster
2	(France) Montpellier	(England) Exeter Chiefs	(Wales) Scarlets
3	(France) Racing 92	(England) Wasps	(Scotland) Glasgow Warriors
4	(France) Lyon	(England) Newcastle Falcons	(Ireland) Munster
5	(France) Toulouse	(England) Leicester Tigers	(Scotland) Edinburgh
6	(France) Toulon	(England) Bath	(Wales) Cardiff Blues
7		(England) Gloucester	(Ireland) Ulster

Based on these seedings, teams are placed into one of the four tiers, with the top seed clubs being put in Tier 1. The nature of the tier system means that a draw is needed to allocate two of the three second seed clubs to Tier 1 and to allocate one of the three fourth seed clubs to Tier 2. The tiers are shown below. Brackets show each team's seeding and their league (for example, "1 Top 14" indicates the team was seeded 1st from the Top 14).

Tier 1	(England) Saracens (1 Prem)	(Ireland) Leinster (1 Pro14)	(France) Castres (1 Top 14)	(Wales) Scarlets (2 Pro14)	(France) Montpellier (2 Top 14)
Tier 2	(England) Exeter Chiefs (2 Prem)	(England) Wasps (3 Prem)	(Scotland) Glasgow Warriors (3 Pro14)	(France) Racing 92 (3 Top 14)	(England) Newcastle Falcons (4 Prem)
Tier 3	(Ireland) Munster (4 Pro14)	(France) Lyon (4 Top 14)	(England) Leicester Tigers (5 Prem)	(Scotland) Edinburgh (5 Pro14)	(France) Toulouse (5 Top 14)
Tier 4	(England) Bath (6 Prem)	(Wales) Cardiff Blues (6 Pro14)	(France) Toulon (6 Top 14)	(Ireland) Ulster (Play-off Pro14)	(England) Gloucester (CC)

== Pool stage ==
The following restrictions will apply to the draw:

- Each pool will consist of four clubs, one from each Tier in the draw.
- Each pool must have one from each league drawn from Tier 1, 2, or 3. No pool will have a second team from the same league until the allocation of Tier 4 takes place.
- Where two Pro14 clubs compete in the same pool, they must be from different countries.

The draw took place on 20 June 2018, in Lausanne, Switzerland.

Teams in the same pool play each other twice, at home and away, in the group stage that begins on the weekend of 12/13/14 October 2018, and continues through to 18/19/20 January 2019. The five pool winners and three best runners-up progress to the quarter-finals.

Teams are awarded group points based on match performances. Four points are awarded for a win, two points for a draw, one attacking bonus point for scoring four or more tries in a match and one defensive bonus point for losing a match by seven points or fewer.

In the event of a tie between two or more teams, the following tie-breakers will be used, as directed by EPCR:

1. Where teams have played each other
  1. The club with the greater number of competition points from only matches involving tied teams.
  2. If equal, the club with the best aggregate points difference from those matches.
  3. If equal, the club that scored the most tries in those matches.
2. Where teams remain tied and/or have not played each other in the competition (i.e. are from different pools)
  1. The club with the best aggregate points difference from the pool stage.
  2. If equal, the club that scored the most tries in the pool stage.
  3. If equal, the club with the fewest players suspended in the pool stage.
  4. If equal, the drawing of lots will determine a club's ranking.

Key to colours
Winner of each pool, advance to quarter-finals.
Three highest-scoring second-place teams advance to quarter-finals.
Cannot advance to the quarter-finals.

(Q) denotes the team has qualified for the quarter-finals as the pool winners
(q) denotes team has at least qualified for the quarter-finals as one of the three highest-scoring second-place teams

=== Pool 1 ===
Team	P	W	D	L	PF	PA	Diff	TF	TA	TB	LB	Pts
(Ireland) Leinster (3)	6	5	0	1	204	88	116	27	10	4	1	25
(France) Toulouse (7)	6	5	0	1	149	136	13	16	15	1	0	21
(England) Bath	6	1	1	4	115	152	–37	14	19	1	3	10
(England) Wasps	6	0	1	5	134	190	–92	13	26	1	1	4

==== Round 1 ====
12 October 2018
19:45

(1 BP) Leinster (Ireland)	52–3	(England) Wasps
Try: Cronin 5' c L. McGrath (2) 40' c, 51' c Lowe (2) 41' c, 60' c Larmour 72' c Henshaw 74' m J. McGrath 79' m Con: Sexton (5/5) 6', 40'+4, 42', 53', 62'; R. Byrne (1/3) '73	Report	Pen: Sopoaga (1/1) 10'

RDS Arena
Attendance: 18,055
Referee: Romain Poite (FFR)

13 October 2018
13:00

(1 BP) Bath (England)	20–22	(France) Toulouse
Try: Burns 28' c Roberts 24' c Con: Burns (2/2) 25', 30'; Pen: Burns (2/5) 2', 47'	Report	Try: Médard 7' c Guitoune (2) 34' m, 61' c Con: Ramos (2/3) 8', 62'; Pen: Ramos (1/1) 53'

Recreation Ground
Attendance: 12,284
Referee: Andrew Brace (IRFU)

==== Round 2 ====
20 October 2018
15:15

(1 BP) Wasps (England)	35–35	(England) Bath (1 BP)
Try: Bassett 17' c Simpson 41' c Zhvania 47' c Johnson 49' c Young 70' c Con: Sopoaga (5/5) 18', 43', 47', 50', 71'	Report	Try: Cokanasiga 2' c Wright 20' c Rokoduguni 29' c Ewels 54' c Louw 63' c Con: Burns (5/5) 3', 21', 30', 55', 64'

Ricoh Arena
Attendance: 15,221
Referee: Jérôme Garcès (FFR)

21 October 2018
15:15

Toulouse (France)	28–27	(Ireland) Leinster (1 BP)
Try: Médard (2) 12' m, 68' c Guitoune 37' c Con: Ramos (2/3) 38', 69'; Pen: Ramos (3/4) 1', 6', 17'	Report	Try: O'Brien 32' c Ryan 46' c Cronin 52' c Con: Sexton (3/3) 34', 47', 53'; Pen: Sexton (2/2) 21', 27'

Stade Ernest-Wallon
Attendance: 17,852
Referee: Wayne Barnes (RFU)

==== Round 3 ====
8 December 2018
15:15

(1 BP) Bath (England)	10–17	(Ireland) Leinster
Try: Thomas 21' c Con: Wilson (1/1) 22'; Pen: Wilson (1/2) 80'; Drop: Wilson (0/1)	Report	Try: Cronin 28' c Larmour 48'; Con: Sexton (2/2) 30', 49'; Pen: Sexton (1/1) 63’

Recreation Ground
Attendance: 14,429
Referee: Mathieu Raynal (FFR)

8 December 2018
17:30

Wasps (England)	16–24	(France) Toulouse
Try: Rowlands 32' c Con: Sopoaga (1/1) 33'; Pen: Sopoaga (1/1) 3'; Daly (2/2) 19', 57'	Report	Try: Kolbe 13' m Guitoune 50' c Con: Ramos (1/2) 52'; Pen: Ramos (4/4) 22', 30', 42', 63'

Ricoh Arena
Attendance: 13,599
Referee: John Lacey (IRFU)

==== Round 4 ====
15 December 2018
15:15

(1 BP) Toulouse (France)	42–27	(England) Wasps
Try: Huget 1' m Tekori 13' c Ntamack 21' c Dupont (2) 41' c, 65' c Con: Ramos (4/5) 14', 22', 42', 66'; Pen: Ramos (3/3) 34', 53', 77'	Report	Try: Bassett 10' c Le Roux 26' c Neal 44' c Con: Searle (3/3) 11', 26', 45'; Pen: Searle (2/2) 8', 36'

Stade Ernest-Wallon
Attendance: 16,737
Referee: Nigel Owens (WRU)

15 December 2018
17:30

(1 BP) Leinster (Ireland)	42–15	(England) Bath
Try: Conan 6' c O'Loughlin 11' c Lowe 25' c Byrne 37' c Leavy 44' c Gibson-Park 67' c Con: Sexton (5/5) 7', 13', 26', 39', 45'; Byrne (1/1) 68'	Report	Try: Louw 19' c Underhill 51' m Con: Wilson (1/2) 20'; Pen: Wilson (1/1) 2'

Aviva Stadium
Attendance: 40,261
Referee: Pascal Gaüzère (FFR)

==== Round 5 ====
12 January 2019
13:00

(1 BP) Leinster (Ireland)	29–13	(France) Toulouse
Try: Conan 34' c Kearney 50' m Cronin 59' c A. Byrne 75' c Con: R. Byrne (2/3) 35', 60'; Reid (1/1) 76'; Pen: R. Byrne (1/1) 7'	Report	Try: Kolbe 80' c Con: Kolbe (1/1) 80'; Pen: Ramos (2/2) 13', 40'+1

RDS Arena
Attendance: 18,493
Referee: Luke Pearce (RFU)

12 January 2019
15:15

Bath (England)	18–16	(England) Wasps (1 BP)
Try: Green 8' m Mercer 21' c Con: Priestland (1/2) 22'; Pen: Priestland (2/2) 60', 78'	Report	Try: Hughes 14' c Con: Sopoaga (1/1) 15'; Pen: Sopoaga (2/3) 6', 44'; Miller (1/1) 63'; Searle (0/1)

Recreation Ground
Attendance: 13,307
Referee: Ben Whitehouse (WRU)

==== Round 6 ====
20 January 2019
15:15

Toulouse (France)	20–17	(England) Bath (1 BP)
Try: Tekori 13' c Dupont 30' c Con: Holmes (2/2) 14', 32'; Pen: Holmes (1/1) 17'; Ramos (1/2) 69'	Report	Try: Rokoduguni 60' c Mercer 75' c Con: Priestland (2/2) 61', 75'; Pen: Priestland (1/1) 23'

Stade Ernest-Wallon
Attendance: 18,754
Referee: George Clancy (IRFU)

20 January 2019
15:15

Wasps (England)	19–37	(Ireland) Leinster (1 BP)
Try: Hughes 52' c Robson 62' c Watson 77' m Con: Sopoaga (2/2) 52', 63'; Searle (0/1)	Report	Try: Ringrose 16' c Cronin (2) 33' c, 57' c Reid 68' c Con: R. Byrne (3/3) 17', 35', 59'; Reid (1/1) 69'; Pen: R. Byrne (2/2) 12', 28'; Reid (1/1) 80'

Ricoh Arena
Attendance: 16,002
Referee: Mike Adamson (SRU)

=== Pool 2 ===
Team	P	W	D	L	PF	PA	Diff	TF	TA	TB	LB	Pts
(Ireland) Munster (5)	6	4	1	1	138	72	66	14	9	2	1	21
(England) Exeter Chiefs	6	2	1	3	124	104	20	18	11	2	2	14
(France) Castres	6	3	0	3	97	142	–45	11	16	1	1	14
(England) Gloucester	6	2	0	4	122	163	–41	15	22	0	0	9

==== Round 1 ====
13 October 2018
15:00

Exeter Chiefs (England)	10–10	(Ireland) Munster
Try: Cowan-Dickie 38' c Con: Steenson (1/1) 39'; Pen: Steenson (1/1) 18'	Report	Try: Stander 63' c Con: Carbery (1/1) 64'; Pen: Carbery (1/1) 31'

Sandy Park
Attendance: 12,749
Referee: Jérôme Garcès (FFR)

14 October 2018
13:00

Gloucester (England)	19–14	(France) Castres (1 BP)
Try: Braley 34' c Con: Cipriani (1/1) 35'; Pen: Cipriani (4/4) 10', 31', 51', 54'	Report	Try: Laveau 57' m Pen: Dumora (2/2) 16', 71'; Drop: Dumora (1/1) 32'

Kingsholm Stadium
Attendance: 9,993
Referee: Marius Mitrea (FIR)

==== Round 2 ====
20 October 2018
13:00

Castres (France)	29–25	(England) Exeter Chiefs (1 BP)
Try: Vialelle 16' c Mafi 44' c Con: Dumora (1/1) 17'; Le Bourhis (1/1) 45'; Pen: Dumora (4/4) 19', 31’, 34’, 51’ Drop: Dumora (1/1) 26'	Report	Try: Cordero 7' c Kvesic 13' c Steenson 38' m Con: Steenson (2/3) 8', 14'; Pen: Steenson (2/2) 48', 61'

Stade Pierre-Fabre
Attendance: 9,600
Referee: John Lacey (IRFU)

20 October 2018
13:00

(1 BP) Munster (Ireland)	36–22	(England) Gloucester
Try: Haley 20' m Carbery 50' c Marshall 34' c Arnold 55' c Conway 66' c Con: Carbery (4/5) 35', 51', 56', 67'; Pen: Carbery (1/3) 29'	Report	Try: Grobler 62' c Woodward 68' m Morgan 78' c Con: Twelvetrees (2/3) 63', 78'; Pen: Cipriani (1/1) 24'

Thomond Park
Attendance: 23,068
Referee: Alexandre Ruiz (FFR)

==== Round 3 ====
8 December 2018
13:00

Exeter Chiefs (England)	19–27	(England) Gloucester
Try: Armand 6' m White 41' c Lawday 78' c Con: Steenson (2/3) 42', 78'	Report	Try: Heinz 14' c Visagie 61' c Morgan 70' c Con: Cipriani (2/2) 15', 62'; Twelvetrees (1/1) 71'; Pen: O. Williams (0/1); Cipriani (2/2) 39', 45'

Sandy Park
Attendance: 11,762
Referee: Pascal Gaüzère (FFR)

9 December 2018
13:00

Munster (Ireland)	30–5	(France) Castres
Try: Scannell 42' c Stander 67' c Hanrahan 74' c Con: Hanrahan (3/3) 44', 68', 75'; Pen: Hanrahan (3/3) 6', 20', 57'	Report	Try: Laveau 80' m Con: Urdapilleta (0/1); Pen: Urdapilleta (0/1)

Thomond Park
Attendance: 21,861
Referee: JP Doyle (RFU)

==== Round 4 ====
14 December 2018
19:45

Gloucester (England)	17–29	(England) Exeter Chiefs (1 BP)
Try: Woodward (2) 29' m, 64' m Hudson 75' c Con: Cipriani (0/2); Twelvetrees (1/1) 76'	Report	Try: Skinner 21' c Armand 39' c Yeandle 73' m Williams 78' c Con: Steenson (3/4) 22', 40', 79'; Pen: Steenson (1/1) 54'

Kingsholm Stadium
Attendance: 11,905
Referee: Mathieu Raynal (FFR)

15 December 2018
17:30

Castres (France)	13–12	(Ireland) Munster (1 BP)
Try: Faʻanunu 23' c Con: Urdapilleta (1/1) 24'; Pen: Urdapilleta (2/2) 10', 56'; Spedding (0/1)	Report	Pen: Carbery (4/4) 2', 19', 50', 66’

Stade Pierre-Fabre
Attendance: 9,746
Referee: Wayne Barnes (RFU)

==== Round 5 ====
11 January 2019
19:45

Gloucester (England)	15–41	(Ireland) Munster (1 BP)
Try: Thorley 51' m Balmain 63' c Con: Twelvetrees (1/2) 63'; Pen: Twelvetrees (1/1) 13'	Report	Try: Carbery (2) 23' c, 67' c Scannell 40'+2 c Earls 55' c Conway 65' c Con: Carbery (5/5) 24', 40'+3, 57', 66', 68'; Pen: Carbery (2/2) 19', 26'

Kingsholm Stadium
Attendance: 15,500
Referee: Romain Poite (FFR)

13 January 2019
13:00

(1 BP) Exeter Chiefs (England)	34–12	(France) Castres
Try: Nowell 2' m J. Simmonds 16' m Hill 29' c O'Flaherty 43' c Slade 53' m Cowan-Dickie 65' m Con: J. Simmonds (2/6) 29', 45'	Report	Try: Paris 8' m Combezou 46' c Con: Urdapilleta (1/2) 47'

Sandy Park
Attendance: 11,800
Referee: George Clancy (IRFU)

==== Round 6 ====
19 January 2019
17:30

(1 BP) Castres (France)	24–22	(England) Gloucester (1 BP)
Try: Vialelle (2) 40' c, 50' c Batlle 71' m Vaipulu 80'+5 m Con: Kockott (2/3) 40'+2, 51'; Caballero (0/1)	Report	Try: Trinder 1' c Vellacott 19' c Williams 67' m Con: Williams (2/3) 2', 20'; Pen: Williams (1/1) 56'

Stade Pierre-Fabre
Attendance: 9,048
Referee: Adam Jones (WRU)

19 January 2019
17:30

Munster (Ireland)	9–7	(England) Exeter Chiefs (1 BP)
Pen: Carbery (3/3) 6', 22', 72'	Report	Try: Armand 12' c Con: J. Simmonds (1/1) 13'

Thomond Park
Attendance: 26,276
Referee: Jérôme Garcès (FFR)

=== Pool 3 ===
Team	P	W	D	L	PF	PA	Diff	TF	TA	TB	LB	Pts
(England) Saracens (1)	6	6	0	0	185	81	104	23	10	4	0	28
(Scotland) Glasgow Warriors (8)	6	4	0	2	147	119	28	19	16	3	0	19
(Wales) Cardiff Blues	6	2	0	4	138	174	–36	19	22	2	0	10
(France) Lyon	6	0	0	6	87	183	–96	10	23	0	0	0

==== Round 1 ====
14 October 2018
13:00

Lyon (France)	21–30	(Wales) Cardiff Blues
Try: Goujon 4' c Barassi 78' m Con: Beauxis (1/2) 5'; Pen: Beauxis (3/3) 12', 35', 39'	Report	Try: Robinson 28' c T. Williams 31' c Anscombe 62' c Con: Anscombe (3/3) 30', 31', 63'; Pen: Anscombe (3/3) 43', 57', 80'

Matmut Stadium de Gerland
Attendance: 12,197
Referee: JP Doyle (RFU)

14 October 2018
15:15

Glasgow Warriors (Scotland)	3–13	(England) Saracens
Pen: Hastings (1/4) 22'	Report	Try: Rhodes 11' c Con: Farrell (1/1) 13'; Pen: Farrell (2/2) 15', 38'

Scotstoun Stadium
Attendance: 7,351
Referee: Mathieu Raynal (FFR)

==== Round 2 ====
20 October 2018
17:30

(1 BP) Saracens (England)	29–10	(France) Lyon
Try: Itoje 12' c Maitland 18' c Barritt 45' c Lewington 76' m Con: Farrell (3/4) 13', 19', 46'; Pen: Farrell (1/1) 3'	Report	Try: Lacombe 68' c Con: Beauxis (1/1) 68'; Pen: Beauxis (1/1) 28'

Allianz Park
Attendance: 10,000
Referee: George Clancy (IRFU)

21 October 2018
15:15

Cardiff Blues (Wales)	12–29	(Scotland) Glasgow Warriors (1 BP)
Try: Summerhill (2) 47' m, 77' c Con: Anscombe (1/2) 78'	Report	Try: Hastings 1' m Van der Merwe 3' c Price 42' c Gray 67' c Con: Hastings (3/4) 5', 43', 67'; Pen: Hastings (1/1) 25'

Cardiff Arms Park
Attendance: 9,497
Referee: Luke Pearce (RFU)

==== Round 3 ====
8 December 2018
13:00

Lyon (France)	22–42	(Scotland) Glasgow Warriors (1 BP)
Try: Arnold 24' c Nakaitaci 53' m McLeod 65' c Con: Pélissié (1/1) 25'; Palisson (0/1); Doussain (1/1) 66'; Pen: Pélissié 11'	Report	Try: Ashe (2) 20' c, 76' c Horne 38' c Hogg 58' m Jones 60' c Con: Hastings (4/5) 21', 39', 61', 77'; Pen: Hastings (3/3) 3', 15', 49'; Hogg (0/1); Drop: Hastings (0/1)

Matmut Stadium de Gerland
Attendance: 12,667
Referee: Matthew Carley (RFU)

9 December 2018
13:00

(1 BP) Saracens (England)	51–25	(Wales) Cardiff Blues
Try: Wigglesworth 3' c Earl (2) 43' m, 46' c Maitland (2) 57' m, 59' c Spencer 68' c Judge 70' c Con: Farrell (5/7) 3', 47', 61', 68', 71'; Pen: Farrell (2/2) 26', 40'+2	Report	Try: Scully 10' m Morgan 18' c Robinson 74' c Con: Anscombe (2/3) 20', 75'; Pen: Anscombe (2/2) 23', 31'

Allianz Park
Attendance: 8,528
Referee: Romain Poite (FFR)

==== Round 4 ====
15 December 2018
13:00

Glasgow Warriors (Scotland)	21–10	(France) Lyon
Try: Matawalu (2) 0' m, 21' c Con: Hastings (1/2) 22'; Pen: Hastings (3/3) 12', 17', 66'	Report	Try: Barassi 51' c Con: Doussain (1/1) 52'; Pen: Doussain (1/1) 40'

Scotstoun Stadium
Attendance: 7,351
Referee: Ben Whitehouse (WRU)

15 December 2018
13:00

Cardiff Blues (Wales)	14–26	(England) Saracens
Try: Lee-Lo 22' c Fish 36' c Con: Anscombe (2/2) 24', 38'	Report	Try: Maitland 8' c George 76' c Con: Farrell (2/2) 9', 76'; Pen: Farrell (4/5) 16', 32', 54', 73'

Cardiff Arms Park
Attendance: 12,018
Referee: Jérôme Garcès (FFR)

==== Round 5 ====
13 January 2019
15:15

(1 BP) Glasgow Warriors (Scotland)	33–24	(Wales) Cardiff Blues (1 BP)
Try: Stewart 26' c Cummings 32' c Fusaro 48' c Kebble 60' c Horne 77' m Con: Thomson (4/5) 27', 33', 49', 61'	Report	Try: Lane (2) 36' m, 70' c Millard 58' m Navidi 64' c Con: J. Evans (2/4) 65', 70'

Scotstoun Stadium
Attendance: 7,351
Referee: JP Doyle (RFU)

13 January 2019
15:15

Lyon (France)	10–28	(England) Saracens (1 BP)
Try: Palisson 69' c Con: Palisson (1/1) 70'; Drop: Wisniewski (1/1) 6'	Report	Try: Tompkins (2) 22' c, 42' c Wray 30' c Spencer 58' c Con: Farrell (4/4) 23', 31', 44', 58'

Matmut Stadium de Gerland
Attendance: 13,031
Referee: Andrew Brace (IRFU)

==== Round 6 ====
19 January 2019
13:00

(1 BP) Cardiff Blues (Wales)	33–14	(France) Lyon
Try: Summerhill (2) 22' c, 32' m Lane 43' c T. Williams 54' c Jones 60' c Con: Anscombe (4/5) 23', 44', 55', 61'	Report	Try: Penalty try 14'; Mignot 37' c Con: Palisson (1/1) 38'

Cardiff Arms Park
Attendance: 6,692
Referee: Karl Dickson (RFU)

19 January 2019
13:00

(1 BP) Saracens (England)	38–19	(Scotland) Glasgow Warriors
Try: Spencer 7' c Koch 17' c B. Vunipola 29' c Itoje 69' c Skelton 80' c Con: Spencer (3/3) 7', 18', 30'; Lozowski (2/2) 70', 80'; Pen: Spencer (1/1) 3'	Report	Try: Seymour 9' m Price 13' c Wilson 20' c Con: Hastings (2/3) 14', 22'

Allianz Park
Attendance: 10,000
Referee: Pascal Gaüzère (FFR)

=== Pool 4 ===
Team	P	W	D	L	PF	PA	Diff	TF	TA	TB	LB	Pts
(France) Racing 92 (2)	6	5	0	1	196	121	75	26	15	5	1	26
(Ireland) Ulster (6)	6	5	0	1	131	128	3	18	16	2	0	22
(Wales) Scarlets	6	1	0	5	145	170	–25	18	23	1	2	7
(England) Leicester Tigers	6	1	0	5	115	168	–53	14	22	2	1	7

==== Round 1 ====
13 October 2018
17:30

(1 BP) Scarlets (Wales)	13–14	(France) Racing 92
Try: G. Davies 52' m McNicholl 57' m Pen: Halfpenny (1/1) 9'	Report	Try: Chouzenoux 39' c Penalty try 76'; Con: Russell (1/1) 40'

Parc y Scarlets
Attendance: 8,064
Referee: Matthew Carley (RFU)

13 October 2018
17:30

Ulster (Ireland)	24–10	(England) Leicester Tigers
Try: O'Connor 43' c Addison 58' c Stockdale 72' c Con: Cooney (3/3) 44', 59', 73'; Pen: Cooney (1/1) 68'	Report	Try: Tuilagi 75' c Con: Ford (1/1) 76'; Pen: Ford (1/1) 14'

Kingspan Stadium
Attendance: 13,152
Referee: Pascal Gaüzère (FFR)

==== Round 2 ====
19 October 2018
19:45

(1 BP) Leicester Tigers (England)	45–27	(Wales) Scarlets
Try: Wells 8' c Thompson 36' m Kalamafoni 46'; Tuilagi 63' c May 71' c Con: Ford (4/5) 8', 47', 64', 73'; Pen: Ford (4/5) 2', 43', 68', 76'	Report	Try: G. Davies 14' c Evans 52' c Thomson 59' c Con: Halfpenny (3/3) 15', 52', 60'; Pen: Halfpenny (2/3) 28', 39'

Welford Road Stadium
Attendance: 18,832
Referee: Romain Poite (FFR)

20 October 2018
17:30

(1 BP) Racing 92 (France)	44–12	(Ireland) Ulster
Try: Iribaren 27' c Lauret 31' c Imhoff 44' c Thomas 68' c Zebo 75' c Con: Russell (4/4) 28', 32', 44', 69'; Iribaren (1/1) 76'; Pen: Russell (3/3) 7', 40', 48'	Report	Try: Shanahan 4' c Stockdale 20' m Con: Burns (1/2) 5'

Paris La Défense Arena
Attendance: 13,168
Referee: Nigel Owens (WRU)

==== Round 3 ====
7 December 2018
19:45

(1 BP) Scarlets (Wales)	24–25	(Ireland) Ulster (1 BP)
Try: S. Evans (2) 25' c, 60' c Davis 79' c Con: Patchell (2/2) 26', 61'; D. Jones (1/1) 79'; Pen: Patchell (1/1) 1'	Report	Try: Stockdale 8' m Speight 33' m Addison 49' c Coetzee 64' m Con: Cooney (1/4) 49'; Pen: Cooney (1/2) 5'

Parc y Scarlets
Attendance: 7,421
Referee: Alexandre Ruiz (FFR)

9 December 2018
15:15

(1 BP) Racing 92 (France)	36–26	(England) Leicester Tigers (1 BP)
Try: Vakatawa 8' c Imhoff 12' m Zebo 23' c Chouzenoux 32' c Klemenczak 59' c Con: Russell (4/5) 9', 24', 33', 60'; Pen: Russell (1/1) 48'	Report	Try: Holmes 15' c Kalamafoni 36' c Tuilagi 42' m Thompstone 69' c Con: G. Ford (2/3) 16', 37'; To'omua (1/1) 70'

Paris La Défense Arena
Attendance: 16,538
Referee: Nigel Owens (WRU)

==== Round 4 ====
14 December 2018
19:45

(1 BP) Ulster (Ireland)	30–15	(Wales) Scarlets
Try: Henderson (2) 32' c, 62' m Stockdale 50' m Cooney 66' c Con: Cooney (2/4) 33', 63'; Pen: Cooney (2/2) 8', 57'	Report	Try: J. Davies 48' m Prydie 77' c Con: Patchell (1/2) 49'; Pen: Patchell (1/1) 38'

Kingspan Stadium
Attendance: 12,124
Referee: Luke Pearce (RFU)

16 December 2018
13:00

Leicester Tigers (England)	11–34	(France) Racing 92 (1 BP)
Try: Worth 32' m Pen: G. Ford (2/2) 5', 17'	Report	Try: Iribaren 7' c Imhoff (2) 12' c, 79' c Vakatawa 20' c Con: Russell (4/4) 8', 14', 21', 79'; Pen: Russell (2/2) 19', 48'

Welford Road Stadium
Attendance: 19,909
Referee: George Clancy (IRFU)

==== Round 5 ====
12 January 2019
15:15

Ulster (Ireland)	26–22	(France) Racing 92 (2 BP)
Try: Baloucoune 7' m Stockdale (2) 13' m, 47' c Con: B. Burns (0/2); Addison (1/1) 48'; Pen: B. Burns (1/1) 1'; Addison (2/2) 25', 79'	Report	Try: Vakatawa 20' m Zebo 27' m Dulin 58' m Klemenczak 63' c Con: Russell (0/3); Iribaren (1/1) 64'

Kingspan Stadium
Attendance: 16,842
Referee: Andrew Jackson (RFU)

12 January 2019
17:30

(1 BP) Scarlets (Wales)	33–10	(England) Leicester Tigers
Try: R. Evans (2) 25' m, 46' c Owens 36' c McNicholl 49' c S. Evans 63' c Con: D. Jones (4/5) 36', 48', 50', 64'	Report	Try: W. Evans 66' m Fitzgerald 76' m Con: J. Ford (0/2)

Parc y Scarlets
Attendance: 8,087
Referee: Mathieu Raynal (FFR)

==== Round 6 ====
19 January 2019
15:15

(1 BP) Leicester Tigers (England)	13–14	(Ireland) Ulster
Try: To'omua 39' c Con: George Ford (1/1) 40'+1; Pen: George Ford (2/2) 31', 49'	Report	Try: Moore 58' c Baloucoune 63' c Con: Cooney (2/2) 59', 64'

Welford Road Stadium
Attendance: 20,146
Referee: Alexandre Ruiz (FFR)

19 January 2019
15:15

(1 BP) Racing 92 (France)	46–33	(Wales) Scarlets
Try: Imhoff 10' m Chavancy 25' c Zebo (2) 47' c, 72' c Vakatawa 52' c Iribaren 66' c Con: Machenaud (3/4) 27', 48', 53'; Russell (2/2) 67', 73'; Pen: Machenaud (1/1) 33'; Iribaren (1/1) 80'	Report	Try: S. Evans 21' c McNicholl (2) 45' c, 75' c Con: D. Jones (2/2) 22', 45'; Hidalgo-Clyne (1/1) 76'; Pen: D. Jones (4/5) 2', 19', 40', 50'

Paris La Défense Arena
Attendance: 14,418
Referee: Andrew Brace (IRFU)

=== Pool 5 ===
Team	P	W	D	L	PF	PA	Diff	TF	TA	TB	LB	Pts
(Scotland) Edinburgh (4)	6	5	0	1	154	83	71	16	11	2	1	23
(France) Montpellier	6	3	0	3	158	116	42	21	11	3	1	16
(France) Toulon	6	2	0	4	134	180	–46	16	21	1	1	10
(England) Newcastle Falcons	6	2	0	4	102	169	–67	10	20	0	1	9

==== Round 1 ====
13 October 2018
15:15

Montpellier (France)	21–15	(Scotland) Edinburgh (1 BP)
Try: Immelman 5' c Fall 31' c N'Gandebe 36' c Con: Pienaar (3/3) 6', 32', 37'	Report	Try: McInally 19' c Fife 57' m Con: Hickey (1/1) 20'; Pen: Hickey (1/1) 40'

Altrad Stadium
Attendance: 10,450
Referee: Wayne Barnes (RFU)

14 October 2018
15:15

(1 BP) Toulon (France)	25–26	(England) Newcastle Falcons
Try: Taofifénua 1' c Lakafia 36' m Guirado 55' c Con: Trinh-Duc (2/3) 1', 56'; Pen: Trinh-Duc (2/2) 6', 62'	Report	Try: Cooper 19' c Penalty try 50'; Con: Hodgson (1/1) 20'; Pen: Hodgson (4/4) 8', 22', 32', 70'

Stade Mayol
Attendance: 13,572
Referee: Ben Whitehouse (WRU)

==== Round 2 ====
20 October 2018
15:15

(1 BP) Edinburgh (Scotland)	40–14	(France) Toulon
Try: Toolis 14' c Pyrgos 23' c McInally 43' c Dean 73' c Con: Van der Walt (3/3) 15', 24', 45'; Hickey (1/1) 75'; Pen: Van der Walt (3/3) 3', 27', 31'	Report	Try: Taofifénua 20' c Ikpefan 71' c Con: Belleau (1/1) 22'; Trinh-Duc (1/1) 72'

Murrayfield Stadium
Attendance: 7,056
Referee: JP Doyle (RFU)

21 October 2018
13:00

Newcastle Falcons (England)	23–20	(France) Montpellier (1 BP)
Try: Graham 4' c Chick 80'+ 8 c Con: Hodgson (2/2) 6', 80'+9; Pen: Hodgson (3/3) 2', 26', 32'	Report	Try: Willemse 67' m Pen: Pienaar (5/5) 10', 16', 52', 58', 72'

Kingston Park
Attendance: 6,383
Referee: Mike Adamson (SRU)

==== Round 3 ====
7 December 2018
19:45

(1 BP) Edinburgh (Scotland)	31–13	(England) Newcastle Falcons
Try: Watson 14' c Dean 43' c Penalty try 56'; Kinghorn 71' c Con: Van der Walt (3/3) 16', 44', 72'; Pen: Van der Walt (1/1) 34'	Report	Try: Radwan 29' c Con: Connon (1/1) 30'; Pen: Connon (2/2) 4', 38'

Murrayfield Stadium
Attendance: 6,803
Referee: Marius Mitrea (FIR)

8 December 2018
15:15

(1 BP) Toulon (France)	38–28	(France) Montpellier (1 BP)
Try: Penalty try 30'; Lakafia 46' c Monribot 70' c Nakosi 75' m Con: Belleau (2/3) 47', 72'; Pen: Belleau (4/5) 4', 16', 43', 58'	Report	Try: Immelman 36'; Steyn 55' c Nagusa (2) 77' c, 79' c Con: Pienaar (4/4) 37', 56', 78', 80'; Pen: Steyn (0/1)

Stade Mayol
Attendance: 11,439
Referee: Luke Pearce (RFU)

==== Round 4 ====
16 December 2018
15:15

Montpellier (France)	34–13	(France) Toulon
Try: Serfontein 13' c Immelman 33' m Giudicelli 43' c Pienaar 50’ c Chilachava 78' m Con: Pienaar (3/4) 14', 44', 51'; Paillaugue (0/1); Pen: Pienaar (1/1) 6'	Report	Try: Gorgodze 55' c Con: Trinh-Duc (1/1) 56'; Pen: Trinh-Duc (2/2) 4', 38'

Altrad Stadium
Attendance: 7,800
Referee: John Lacey (IRFU)

16 December 2018
15:15

Newcastle Falcons (England)	8–21	(Scotland) Edinburgh
Try: Sinoti 18' m Con: Flood (0/1); Pen: Flood (1/1) 27'	Report	Try: Johnstone 42' c van der Merwe 73' m Con: van der Walt (1/2) 43'; Pen: van der Walt (3/3) 22', 33', 60'

Kingston Park
Attendance: 7,174
Referee: Alexandre Ruiz (FFR)

==== Round 5 ====
12 January 2019
13:00

(1 BP) Montpellier (France)	45–8	(England) Newcastle Falcons
Try: Nagusa 15' m Reilhac 31' c Willemse 48' c Immelman (2) 54' c, 68' c Van Rensburg 58' c Ruffenach 72' m Con: Pienaar (5/7) 32', 49', 55', 59', 69'	Report	Try: Kibirige 77' m Con: Flood (0/1); Pen: Flood (1/1) 21'

Altrad Stadium
Attendance: 7,923
Referee: Marius Mitrea (FIR)

12 January 2019
17:30

Toulon (France)	17–28	(Scotland) Edinburgh
Try: Guirado 1' m Isa 21' c Savea 71' m Con: Belleau (1/3) 22'	Report	Try: Graham 14' m Kinghorn 43' c Johnstone 63' c Con: Van der Walt (2/3) 44', 64'; Pen: Van der Walt (3/4) 9', 47', 61'

Stade Mayol
Attendance: 13,096
Referee: Wayne Barnes (RFU)

==== Round 6 ====
18 January 2019
19:45

Edinburgh (Scotland)	19–10	(France) Montpellier
Try: Graham 60' c Con: Van der Walt (1/1) 62'; Pen: Van der Walt (4/5) 12', 16', 32', 56'	Report	Try: Jac. du Plessis 39' c Con: Pienaar (1/1) 40'; Pen: Pienaar (1/1) 47'

Murrayfield Stadium
Attendance: 11,802
Referee: JP Doyle (RFU)

18 January 2019
19:45

(1 BP) Newcastle Falcons (England)	24–27	(France) Toulon
Try: Matavesi 3' c Nagusa 70' c Young 71' c Con: Flood (3/3) 4', 70', 72'; Pen: Flood (1/1) 27'	Report	Try: Ikpefan 5' c Nakosi 30' c Soury 73' c Con: Carbonel (2/2) 5', 31'; Belleau (1/1) 74'; Pen: Carbonel (2/2) 37', 49'

Kingston Park
Attendance: 6,694
Referee: Dan Jones (WRU)

== See also ==
- 2018–19 European Rugby Challenge Cup
