= 2019–20 Top 14 season =

French domestic rugby union competition

2019–20 Top 14
- Countries: France
- Date: 24 August 2019 – 1 March 2020
- Matches played: 119
- Attendance: 1,672,486 (average 14,055 per match)
- Highest attendance: 38,503; Bordeaux Bègles v La Rochelle; 22 December 2019
- Lowest attendance: 6,009; Agen v Montpellier; 15 September 2019
- Top point scorer: (France) Thomas Laranjeira (Brive); 181 points
- Top try scorer: (France) Arthur Retière (La Rochelle); 9 tries

Official website
- www.lnr.fr/rugby-top-14

The 2019–20 Top 14 competition was the 121st French domestic rugby union club competition operated by the Ligue Nationale de Rugby (LNR). Two new teams from the 2018–19 Pro D2 season were promoted to Top 14 (Bayonne and Brive) in place of the two relegated teams, Perpignan and Grenoble.
Playing was suspended after the 17th Matchday due to the COVID-19 pandemic in France. The season was officially cancelled without any winner or relegation/promotion on 6 May.

== Teams ==
Locations of the 2019–20 Top 14 teams

| Club | City (department) | Stadium | Capacity | Previous season |
|---|---|---|---|---|
| Agen | Agen (Lot-et-Garonne) | Stade Armandie | 13,863 | 12th |
| Bayonne | Bayonne (Pyrénées-Atlantiques) | Stade Jean Dauger | 16,934 | Promoted from Pro D2 (champions and 3rd in league) |
| Bordeaux Bègles | Bordeaux (Gironde) | Stade Chaban-Delmas (Note: In recent years, Bordeaux Bègles has taken occasional home matches to Matmut Atlantique.) | 33,500 | 10th |
| Brive | Brive-la-Gaillarde (Corrèze) | Stade Amédée-Domenech | 13,979 | Promoted from Pro D2 (play-off accession and 1st in league) |
| Castres | Castres (Tarn) | Stade Pierre-Fabre | 12,500 | 7th |
| Clermont | Clermont-Ferrand (Puy-de-Dôme) | Stade Marcel-Michelin | 19,022 | Runners up (2nd in league) |
| La Rochelle | La Rochelle (Charente-Maritime) | Stade Marcel-Deflandre | 16,000 | Semi-finals (5th in league) |
| Lyon | Lyon (Métropole de Lyon) | Matmut Stadium de Gerland | 25,000 | Semi-finals (3rd in league) |
| Montpellier | Montpellier (Hérault) | Altrad Stadium | 15,697 | Quarter-finals (6th in league) |
| Pau | Pau (Pyrénées-Atlantiques) | Stade du Hameau | 18,324 | 11th |
| Racing | Nanterre (Hauts-de-Seine) | Paris La Défense Arena | 30,681 | Quarter-finals (4th in league) |
| Stade Français | Paris, 16th arrondissement | Stade Jean-Bouin | 20,000 | 8th |
| Toulon | Toulon (Var) | Stade Mayol (Note: In recent years, Toulon has taken occasional home matches to Stade Vélodrome in Marseille and Allianz Riviera in Nice.) | 18,200 | 9th |
| Toulouse | Toulouse (Haute-Garonne) | Stade Ernest-Wallon (Note: Toulouse often takes high-demand home matches to the city's largest sporting venue, Stadium de Toulouse.) | 18,754 | Champions (1st in league) |

== Number of teams by region ==
| Teams | Region or country | Team(s) |
|---|---|---|
| 6 | Nouvelle-Aquitaine | Agen, Bayonne, Bordeaux Bègles, Brive, La Rochelle, Pau |
| 3 | Occitanie | Castres, Montpellier, Toulouse |
| 2 | Auvergne-Rhône-Alpes | Clermont, Lyon |
| 2 | Île-de-France | Racing, Stade Français |
| 1 | Provence-Alpes-Côte d'Azur | Toulon |

== Competition format ==
The top six teams at the end of the regular season (after all the teams played one another twice, once at home, once away) enter a knockout stage to decide the Champions of France. This consists of three rounds: the teams finishing third to sixth in the table play quarter-finals (hosted by the third and fourth placed teams). The winners then face the top two teams in the semi-finals, with the winners meeting in the final at the Stade de France in Saint-Denis.

The LNR uses a slightly different bonus points system from that used in most other rugby competitions. It trialled a new system in 2007–08 explicitly designed to prevent a losing team from earning more than one bonus point in a match, a system that also made it impossible for either team to earn a bonus point in a drawn match. LNR chose to continue with this system for subsequent seasons.

France's bonus point system operates as follows:

- 4 points for a win.
- 2 points for a draw.
- 1 bonus point for winning while scoring at least 3 more tries than the opponent. This replaces the standard bonus point for scoring 4 tries regardless of the match result.
- 1 bonus point for losing by 5 points (or fewer). The margin had been 7 points until being changed prior to the 2014–15 season.

== Table ==
2019–20 Top 14 Table
| | Club | Played | Won | Drawn | Lost | Points For | Points Against | Points Diff. | Try Bonus | Losing Bonus | Points |
| 1 | Bordeaux Bègles | 17 | 13 | 1 | 3 | 475 | 317 | +158 | 6 | 1 | 61 |
| 2 | Lyon | 17 | 12 | 0 | 5 | 463 | 304 | +159 | 5 | 0 | 53 |
| 3 | Racing | 17 | 9 | 1 | 7 | 451 | 326 | +125 | 5 | 3 | 46 |
| 4 | Toulon | 17 | 9 | 2 | 6 | 396 | 334 | +62 | 3 | 2 | 45 |
| 5 | La Rochelle | 17 | 9 | 0 | 8 | 370 | 377 | –7 | 3 | 3 | 42 |
| 6 | Clermont | 17 | 10 | 0 | 7 | 423 | 415 | +8 | 1 | 0 | 41 |
| 7 | Toulouse | 17 | 8 | 1 | 8 | 368 | 331 | +37 | 4 | 2 | 40 |
| 8 | Montpellier | 17 | 6 | 3 | 8 | 404 | 390 | +14 | 2 | 5 | 37 |
| 9 | Bayonne | 17 | 7 | 1 | 9 | 327 | 409 | –82 | 0 | 3 | 33 |
| 10 | Castres | 17 | 7 | 0 | 10 | 392 | 460 | –68 | 3 | 2 | 33 |
| 11 | Brive | 17 | 7 | 1 | 9 | 364 | 439 | –75 | 1 | 2 | 33 |
| 12 | Pau | 17 | 6 | 0 | 11 | 334 | 414 | –80 | 0 | 4 | 28 |
| 13 | Agen | 17 | 5 | 1 | 11 | 323 | 414 | –91 | 0 | 4 | 26 |
| 14 | Stade Français | 17 | 5 | 1 | 11 | 328 | 488 | –160 | 0 | 3 | 25 |
If teams are level at any stage, tiebreakers are applied in the following order: 1. Competition points earned in head-to-head matches 2. Points difference in head-to-head matches 3. Try differential in head-to-head matches 4. Points difference in all matches 5. Try differential in all matches 6. Points scored in all matches 7. Tries scored in all matches 8. Fewer matches forfeited 9. Classification in the previous Top 14 season
Green background (rows 1 to 8) receive berths in the 2020–21 European Rugby Champions Cup. Plain background indicates teams that earn a place in the 2020–21 European Rugby Challenge Cup. Final table

== Relegation ==
Starting from the 2017–18 season forward, only the 14th placed team will be automatically relegated to Pro D2. The 13th placed team will face the runner-up of the Pro D2 play-off, with the winner of that play-off taking up the final place in Top 14 for the following season.

== Fixtures and results ==
=== Round 1 ===
24 August 2019
18:00

| Agen | 25–44 | Toulon (1 BP) |
| | Report |

Stade Armandie
Attendance: 8,802
Referee: Laurent Cardona

24 August 2019
18:00

| Castres | 26–25 | Montpellier (1 BP) |
| | Report |

Stade Pierre-Fabre
Attendance: 10,080
Referee: Thomas Charabas

24 August 2019
18:00

| (1 BP) Lyon | 43–9 | Stade Français |
| | Report |

Matmut Stadium de Gerland
Attendance: 10,778
Referee: Romain Poite

24 August 2019
18:00

| Pau | 35–14 | Brive |
| | Report |

Stade du Hameau
Attendance: 11,123
Referee: Luc Ramos

24 August 2019
18:00

| Racing | 17–24 | Bayonne |
| | Report |

Paris La Défense Arena
Attendance: 9,267
Referee: Pierre Baptiste Nuchy

24 August 2019
20:45

| Bordeaux Bègles | 30–25 | Toulouse (1 BP) |
| | Report |

Stade Chaban-Delmas
Attendance: 24,254
Referee: Maxime Chalon

25 August 2019
15:50

| Clermont | 28–10 | La Rochelle |
| | Report |

Stade Marcel-Michelin
Attendance: 16,846
Referee: Adrien Descottes

=== Round 2 ===
31 August 2019
14:30

| (1 BP) Bayonne | 30–34 | Clermont |
| | Report |

Stade Jean Dauger
Attendance: 15,257
Referee: Tual Trainini

31 August 2019
17:00

| Agen | 16–10 | Brive |
| | Report |

Stade Armandie
Attendance: 6,909
Referee: Cédric Marchat

31 August 2019
17:00

| La Rochelle | 28–26 | Stade Français (1 BP) |
| | Report |

Stade Marcel-Deflandre
Attendance: 16,000
Referee: Alexandre Ruiz

31 August 2019
17:00

| (1 BP) Montpellier | 43–22 | Pau |
| | Report |

Altrad Stadium
Attendance: 6,825
Referee: Vincent Blasco-Baqué

31 August 2019
19:45

| (1 BP) Bordeaux Bègles | 34–12 | Toulon |
| | Report |

Stade Chaban-Delmas
Attendance: 17,451
Referee: Ludovic Cayre

1 September 2019
11:30

| Racing | 23–14 | Castres |
| | Report |

Paris La Défense Arena
Attendance: 7,102
Referee: Julien Castaignède

1 September 2019
16:05

| Lyon | 22–12 | Toulouse |
| | Report |

Matmut Stadium de Gerland
Attendance: 13,227
Referee: Sébastien Minery

=== Round 3 ===
7 September 2019
14:30

| (1 BP) Castres | 32–34 | Bordeaux Bègles |
| | Report |

Stade Pierre-Fabre
Attendance: 9,491
Referee: Laurent Cardona

7 September 2019
16:30

| Toulon | 6–20 | Lyon |
| | Report |

Stade Mayol
Attendance: 14,821
Referee: Pierre Brousset

7 September 2019
19:45

| Montpellier | 30–16 | La Rochelle |
| | Report |

Altrad Stadium
Attendance: 9,928
Referee: Vivien Praderie

7 September 2019
19:45

| Pau | 18–12 | Agen |
| | Report |

Stade du Hameau
Attendance: 10,367
Referee: Pascal Gaüzère

7 September 2019
19:45

| Stade Français | 33–27 | Bayonne |
| | Report |

Stade Jean-Bouin
Attendance: 8,699
Referee: Cedric Marchat

8 September 2019
15:50

| Brive | 28–21 | Clermont |
| | Report |

Stade Amédée-Domenech
Attendance: 12,161
Referee: Jonathan Dufort

8 September 2019
20:00

| Toulouse | 20–17 | Racing (1 BP) |
| | Report |

Stade Ernest-Wallon
Attendance: 14,573
Referee: Ludovic Cayre

=== Round 4 ===
14 September 2019
14:30

| La Rochelle | 28–13 | Toulouse |
| | Report |

Stade Marcel-Deflandre
Attendance: 16,000
Referee: Tual Trainini

14 September 2019
17:00

| Bayonne | 27–17 | Castres |
| | Report |

Stade Jean Dauger
Attendance: 13,200
Referee: Maxime Chalon

14 September 2019
17:00

| Clermont | 28–37 | Pau |
| | Report |

Stade Marcel-Michelin
Attendance: 14,957
Referee: Sébastien Minery

14 September 2019
17:00

| (1 BP) Lyon | 59–3 | Brive |
| | Report |

Matmut Stadium de Gerland
Attendance: 12,085
Referee: Vincent Blasco-Baqué

14 September 2019
19:45

| (1 BP) Bordeaux Bègles | 52–3 | Stade Français |
| | Report |

Stade Chaban-Delmas
Attendance: 18,092
Referee: Adrien Descottes

15 September 2019
12:30

| Agen | 29–10 | Montpellier |
| | Report |

Stade Armandie
Attendance: 6,009
Referee: Pierre Brousset

15 September 2019
16:50

| Toulon | 32–29 | Racing (1 BP) |
| | Report |

Stade Mayol
Attendance: 12,124
Referee: Thomas Charabas

=== Round 5 ===
28 September 2019
14:30

| Brive | 39–17 | Toulon |
| | Report |

Stade Amédée-Domenech
Attendance: 9,489
Referee: Ludovic Cayre

28 September 2019
17:00

| Bayonne | 23–22 | La Rochelle (1 BP) |
| | Report |

Stade Jean Dauger
Attendance: 16,132
Referee: Julien Castaignède

28 September 2019
17:00

| Castres | 30–27 | Agen (1 BP) |
| | Report |

Stade Pierre-Fabre
Attendance: 9,987
Referee: Luc Ramos

28 September 2019
17:00

| Toulouse | 24–23 | Pau (1 BP) |
| | Report |

Stade Ernest-Wallon
Attendance: 14,700
Referee: Pierre Baptiste Nuchy

28 September 2019
19:45

| Racing | 20–31 | Lyon |
| | Report |

Paris La Défense Arena
Attendance: 12,566
Referee: Jonathan Dufort

29 September 2019
11:30

| Montpellier | 17–17 | Bordeaux Bègles |
| | Report |

Altrad Stadium
Attendance: 9,924
Referee: Marchat

29 September 2019
15:50

| Stade Français | 18–32 | Clermont |
| | Report |

Stade Jean-Bouin
Attendance: 9,533
Referee: Pierre Brousset

=== Round 6 ===
5 October 2019
14:30

| Clermont | 20–13 | Montpellier |
| | Report |

Stade Marcel-Michelin
Attendance: 16,800
Referee: Maxime Chalon

5 October 2019
17:00

| (1 BP) Agen | 27–29 | Bayonne |
| | Report |

Stade Armandie
Attendance: 10,043
Referee: Adrien Descottes

5 October 2019
17:00

| Brive | 23–9 | Toulouse |
| | Report |

Stade Amédée-Domenech
Attendance: 11,616
Referee: Laurent Cardona

5 October 2019
17:00

| (1 BP) Castres | 46–16 | Stade Français |
| | Report |

Stade Pierre-Fabre
Attendance: 9,325
Referee: Vivien Praderie

5 October 2019
19:45

| (1 BP) Lyon | 25–23 | Bordeaux Bègles (1 BP) |
| | Report |

Matmut Stadium de Gerland
Attendance: 15,512
Referee: Ludovic Cayre

6 October 2019
11:30

| Pau | 3–31 | Racing (1 BP) |
| | Report |

Stade du Hameau
Attendance: 11,257
Referee: Tual Trainini

6 October 2019
15:50

| Toulon | 23–3 | La Rochelle |
| | Report |

Stade Mayol
Attendance: 12,322
Referee: Sébastien Minery

=== Round 7 ===
12 October 2019
14:30

| Bayonne | 28–24 | Montpellier (1 BP) |
| | Report |

Stade Jean Dauger
Attendance: 12,517
Referee: Pierre Brousset

12 October 2019
16:30

| (1 BP) Toulouse | 36–15 | Castres |
| | Report |

Stade Ernest-Wallon
Attendance: 17,600
Referee: Ludovic Cayre

12 October 2019
19:45

| (1 BP) La Rochelle | 41–17 | Brive |
| | Report |

Stade Marcel-Deflandre
Attendance: 16,000
Referee: Luc Ramos

12 October 2019
19:45

| Lyon | 27–8 | Pau |
| | Report |

Matmut Stadium de Gerland
Attendance: 14,704
Referee: Cédric Marchat

12 October 2019
19:45

| Racing | 27–27 | Agen |
| | Report |

Paris La Défense Arena
Attendance: 11,665
Referee: Vincent Blasco-Baqué

13 October 2019
15:50

| Stade Français | 33–30 | Toulon (1 BP) |
| | Report |

Stade Jean-Bouin
Attendance: 11,000
Referee: Jonathan Dufort

13 October 2019
20:00

| Bordeaux Bègles | 42 – 15 | Clermont |
| | Report |

Stade Chaban-Delmas
Attendance: 25,170
Referee: Thomas Charabas

=== Round 8 ===
19 October 2019
14:30

| Montpellier | 33–22 | Toulouse |
| | Report |

Altrad Stadium
Attendance: 11,000
Referee: Tual Trainini

19 October 2019
17:00

| Agen | 27–14 | Stade Français |
| | Report |

Stade Armandie
Attendance: 7,710
Referee: Laurent Cardona

19 October 2019
17:00

| (1 BP) Brive | 30–9 | Bordeaux Bègles |
| | Report |

Stade Amédée-Domenech
Attendance: 9,457
Referee: Pierre Brousset

19 October 2019
17:00

| Pau | 37–24 | Castres |
| | Report |

Stade du Hameau
Attendance: 10,024
Referee: Maxime Chalon

19 October 2019
17:00

| Toulon | 20–9 | Bayonne |
| | Report |

Stade Mayol
Attendance: 12,276
Referee: Pierre-Baptiste Nuchy

19 October 2019
19:45

| La Rochelle | 12–6 | Racing |
| | Report |

Stade Marcel-Deflandre
Attendance: 16,000
Referee: Adrien Descottes

20 October 2019
15:50

| Clermont | 24–15 | Lyon |
| | Report |

Stade Marcel-Michelin
Attendance: 17,502
Referee: Adrien Descottes

=== Round 9 ===
9 November 2019
14:30

| Toulon | 19–19 | Montpellier |
| | Report |

Stade Mayol
Attendance: 14,336
Referee: Thomas Charabas

9 November 2019
17:00

| Bordeaux Bègles | 23–0 | Agen |
| | Report |

Stade Chaban-Delmas
Attendance: 18,799
Referee: Romain Poite

9 November 2019
17:00

| Castres | 28–26 | Brive (1 BP) |
| | Report |

Stade Amédée-Domenech
Attendance: 9,628
Referee: Julien Castaignède

9 November 2019
17:00

| Bayonne | 3–9 | Pau |
| | Report |

Stade Jean Dauger
Attendance: 16,630
Referee: Ludovic Cayre

9 November 2019
19:45

| (1 BP) Toulouse | 34–8 | Clermont |
| | Report |

Stadium de Toulouse
Attendance: 32,800
Referee: Alexandre Ruiz

10 November 2019
11:30

| (1 BP) Lyon | 45–17 | La Rochelle |
| | Report |

Matmut Stadium de Gerland
Attendance: 15,884
Referee: Vincent Blasco-Baqué

10 November 2019
15:45

| Stade Français | 9–25 | Racing (1 BP) |
| | Report |

Stade Jean-Bouin
Attendance: 13,000
Referee: Pierre Brousset

=== Round 10 ===
30 November 2019
14:30

| (1 BP) Racing | 30–34 | Bordeaux Bègles |
| | Report |

Paris La Défense Arena
Attendance: 16,032
Referee: Jonathan Dufort

30 November 2019
17:00

| Clermont | 30–13 | Agen |
| | Report |

Stade Marcel-Michelin
Attendance: 15,843
Referee: Vivien Praderie

30 November 2019
17:00

| La Rochelle | 22–13 | Castres |
| | Report |

Stade Marcel-Deflandre
Attendance: 16,000
Referee: Pierre-Baptiste Nuchy

30 November 2019
17:00

| Pau | 9–19 | Toulon |
| | Report |

Stade du Hameau
Attendance: 8,000
Referee: Laurent Cardona

30 November 2019
19:45

| (1 BP) Montpellier | 33–8 | Lyon |
| | Report |

Altrad Stadium
Attendance: 10,622
Referee: Pascal Gaüzère

1 December 2019
11:30

| Brive | 26–21 | Stade Français (1 BP) |
| | Report |

Stade Amédée-Domenech
Attendance: 9,861
Referee: Mathieu Raynal

1 December 2019
15:50

| (1 BP) Toulouse | 45–10 | Bayonne |
| | Report |

Stade Ernest-Wallon
Attendance: 18,838
Referee: Adrien Descottes

=== Round 11 ===
21 December 2019
14:30

| (1 BP) Castres | 29–12 | Lyon |
| | Report |

Stade Pierre-Fabre
Attendance: 10,724
Referee: Jonathan Dufort

21 December 2019
14:35

| Bayonne | 6–6 | Brive |
| | Report |

Stade Jean Dauger
Attendance: 13,234
Referee: Cédric Marchat

21 December 2019
14:35

| Racing | 29–25 | Montpellier (1 BP) |
| | Report |

Paris La Défense Arena
Attendance: 13,266
Referee: Tual Trainini

21 December 2019
16:45

| (1 BP) Agen | 8–13 | Toulouse |
| | Report |

Stade Armandie
Attendance: 13,500
Referee: Thomas Charabas

22 December 2019
11:30

| Stade Français | 21–18 | Pau (1 BP) |
| | Report |

Stade Jean-Bouin
Attendance: 8,217
Referee: Alexandre Ruiz

22 December 2019
15:45

| Bordeaux Bègles | 20–15 | La Rochelle (1 BP) |

Matmut Atlantique
Attendance: 38,503
Referee: Maxime Chalon

22 December 2019
20:00

| (1 BP) Toulon | 41–19 | Clermont |
| | Report |

Stade Mayol
Attendance: 17,287
Referee: Romain Poite

=== Round 12 ===
28 December 2019
13:00

| Lyon | 52–9 | Bayonne |
| | Report |

Matmut Stadium de Gerland
Attendance: 16,002
Referee: Vivien Praderie

28 December 2019
15:00

| Brive | 20–44 | Racing (1 BP) |
| | Report |

Stade Amédée-Domenech
Attendance: 12,273
Referee: Ludovic Cayre

28 December 2019
17:00

| Montpellier | 20–20 | Stade Français |
| | Report |

Altrad Stadium
Attendance: 15,000
Referee: Julien Castaignède

29 December 2019
14:45

| (1 BP) La Rochelle | 40–8 | Agen |
| | Report |

Stade Marcel-Deflandre
Attendance: 16,000
Referee: Pascal Gaüzère

29 December 2019
14:45

| (1 BP) Pau | 23–27 | Bordeaux Bègles |
| | Report |

Stade du Hameau
Attendance: 16,153
Referee: Pierre Brousset

29 December 2019
17:00

| Clermont | 39–22 | Castres |
| | Report |

Stade Marcel-Michelin
Attendance: 18,804
Referee: Sébastien Minery

29 December 2019
20:00

| Toulouse | 13–13 | Toulon |
| | Report |

Stadium de Toulouse
Attendance: 33,000
Referee: Mathieu Raynal

=== Round 13 ===
4 January 2020
14:30

| (1 BP) Agen | 12–13 | Lyon |
| | Report |

Stade Armandie
Attendance: 6,536
Referee: Alexandre Ruiz

4 January 2020
16:45

| Racing | 27–19 | Clermont |
| | Report |

Paris La Défense Arena
Attendance: 21,338
Referee: Laurent Cardona

4 January 2020
19:45

| (1 BP) Bordeaux Bègles | 22–3 | Bayonne |
| | Report |

Stade Chaban-Delmas
Attendance: 28,121
Referee: Luc Ramos

4 January 2020
19:45

| Montpellier | 29–26 | Brive (1 BP) |
| | Report |

Altrad Stadium
Attendance: 8,000
Referee: Vincent Blasco-Baqué

4 January 2020
19:45

| Pau | 13–44 | La Rochelle (1 BP) |
| | Report |

Stade du Hameau
Attendance: 12,157
Referee: Romain Poite

5 January 2020
17:00

| (1 BP) Toulon | 43–3 | Castres |
| | Report |

Stade Mayol
Attendance: 13,570
Referee: Adrien Descottes

5 January 2020
20:00

| Stade Français | 30–18 | Toulouse |
| | Report |

Stade Jean-Bouin
Attendance: 14,050
Referee: Tual Trainini

=== Round 14 ===
25 January 2020
15:30

| (1 BP) Lyon | 27–12 | Toulon |
| | Report |

Matmut Stadium de Gerland
Attendance: 16,256
Referee: Pierre Baptiste Nuchy

25 January 2020
18:00

| Brive | 33–26 | Pau |
| | Report |

Stade Amédée-Domenech
Attendance: 10,221
Referee: Pascal Gaüzère

25 January 2020
18:00

| Castres | 0–27 | Racing (1 BP) |
| | Report |

Stade Pierre-Fabre
Attendance: 9,863
Referee: Mathieu Raynal

25 January 2020
18:00

| La Rochelle | 35–30 | Montpellier (1 BP) |
| | Report |

Stade Marcel-Deflandre
Attendance: 16,000
Referee: Thomas Charabas

25 January 2020
20:45

| Clermont | 29–19 | Stade Français |
| | Report |

Stade Marcel-Michelin
Attendance: 15,517
Referee: Maxime Chalon

26 January 2020
12:30

| (1 BP) Bayonne | 22–23 | Agen |
| | Report |

Stade Jean Dauger
Attendance: 13,112
Referee: Romain Poite

26 January 2020
16:50

| Toulouse | 22–14 | Bordeaux Bègles |
| | Report |

Stade Ernest-Wallon
Attendance: 18,669
Referee: Ludovic Cayre

=== Round 15 ===
15 February 2020
14:30

| (1 BP) Bordeaux Bègles | 37–19 | Lyon |
| | Report |

Stade Chaban-Delmas
Attendance: 33,100
Referee: Vincent Blasco-Baqué

15 February 2020
17:00

| Montpellier | 31–29 | Bayonne (1 BP) |
| | Report |

Altrad Stadium
Attendance: 8,000
Referee: Maxime Chalon

15 February 2020
17:00

| (1 BP) Pau | 20–23 | Clermont |
| | Report |

Stade du Hameau
Attendance: 12,657
Referee: Jonathan Dufort

15 February 2020
17:00

| Toulon | 34–17 | Brive |
| | Report |

Stade Mayol
Attendance: 13,281
Referee: Sébastien Minery

15 February 2020
19:45

| Stade Français | 21–20 | La Rochelle (1 BP) |
| | Report |

Stade Jean-Bouin
Attendance: 8,000
Referee: Pierre Brousset

16 February 2020
11:30

| Agen | 24–43 | Castres (1 BP) |
| | Report |

Stade Armandie
Attendance: 8,065
Referee: Laurent Cardona

16 February 2020
15:45

| Racing | 30–27 | Toulouse (1 BP) |
| | Report |

Paris La Défense Arena
Attendance: 26,292
Referee: Alexandre Ruiz

=== Round 16 ===
22 February 2020
14:30

| La Rochelle | 17–12 | Toulon (1 BP) |
| | Report |

Stade Marcel-Deflandre
Attendance: 16,000
Referee: Ludovic Cayre

22 February 2020
19:30

| Bayonne | 28–17 | Stade Français |
| | Report |

Stade Jean Dauger
Attendance: 13,107
Referee: Adrien Descottes

22 February 2020
19:30

| Brive | 16–30 | Agen |
| | Report |

Stade Amédée-Domenech
Attendance: 10,228
Referee: Tual Trainini

22 February 2020
19:30

| Castres | 26–16 | Pau |
| | Report |

Stade Pierre-Fabre
Attendance: 10,427
Referee: Maxime Chalon

22 February 2020
19:45

| Clermont | 22–31 | Bordeaux Bègles (1 BP) |
| | Report |

Stade Marcel-Michelin
Attendance: 18,261
Referee: Thomas Charabas

23 February 2020
11:30

| Lyon | 29–20 | Racing |
| | Report |

Matmut Stadium de Gerland
Attendance: 15,853
Referee: Pascal Gaüzère

23 February 2020
15:50

| (1 BP) Toulouse | 25–7 | Montpellier |
| | Report |

Stade Ernest-Wallon
Attendance: 17,073
Referee: Pierre-Baptiste Nuchy

=== Round 17 ===
29 February 2020
14:30

| (1 BP) Racing | 49–0 | La Rochelle |
| | Report |

Paris La Défense Arena
Attendance: 17,856
Referee: Jonathan Dufort

29 February 2020
17:00

| Agen | 15–32 | Clermont (1 BP) |
| | Report |

Stade Armandie
Attendance: 7,235
Referee: Cédric Marchat

29 February 2020
17:00

| Bayonne | 20–10 | Toulouse |
| | Report |

Stade Jean Dauger
Attendance: 16,606
Referee: Laurent Cardona

29 February 2020
17:00

| Pau | 19–15 | Montpellier (1 BP) |
| | Report |

Stade du Hameau
Attendance: 9,014
Referee: Mathieu Raynal

29 February 2020
19:45

| Brive | 30–16 | Lyon |
| | Report |

Stade Amédée-Domenech
Attendance: 12,000
Referee: Romain Poite

1 March 2020
11:30

| Bordeaux Bègles | 26–24 | Castres (1 BP) |
| | Report |

Stade Chaban-Delmas
Attendance: 17,172
Referee: Vivien Praderie

1 March 2020
15:50

| Toulon | 19–18 | Stade Français (1 BP) |
| | Report |

Stade Mayol
Attendance: 12,354
Referee: Luc Ramos

== Positions by round ==
The table lists the positions of teams after each week of matches. In order to preserve chronological evolvements, any postponed matches are not included to the round at which they were originally scheduled, but added to the full round they were played immediately afterwards.

| Team ╲ Round | 1 | 2 | 3 | 4 | 5 | 6 | 7 | 8 | 9 | 10 | 11 | 12 | 13 | 14 | 15 | 16 | 17 |
|---|---|---|---|---|---|---|---|---|---|---|---|---|---|---|---|---|---|
| Agen | 12 | 10 | 13 | 8 | 7 | 11 | 12 | 10 | 13 | 13 | 13 | 13 | 14 | 13 | 14 | 12 | 13 |
| Bayonne | 5 | 5 | 7 | 5 | 4 | 3 | 3 | 3 | 3 | 8 | 8 | 11 | 12 | 10 | 11 | 11 | 9 |
| Bordeaux Bègles | 6 | 2 | 2 | 2 | 2 | 2 | 2 | 2 | 2 | 2 | 1 | 1 | 1 | 2 | 1 | 1 | 1 |
| Brive | 13 | 14 | 12 | 14 | 12 | 9 | 13 | 9 | 12 | 9 | 6 | 9 | 9 | 9 | 9 | 10 | 11 |
| Castres | 7 | 9 | 8 | 11 | 9 | 5 | 8 | 12 | 10 | 12 | 11 | 12 | 10 | 12 | 10 | 9 | 10 |
| Clermont | 4 | 3 | 4 | 7 | 5 | 4 | 4 | 4 | 6 | 6 | 7 | 6 | 8 | 8 | 6 | 7 | 6 |
| La Rochelle | 11 | 11 | 14 | 9 | 8 | 12 | 6 | 6 | 11 | 7 | 9 | 5 | 4 | 4 | 5 | 3 | 5 |
| Lyon | 1 | 1 | 1 | 1 | 1 | 1 | 1 | 1 | 1 | 1 | 2 | 2 | 2 | 1 | 2 | 2 | 2 |
| Montpellier | 8 | 4 | 3 | 4 | 6 | 8 | 10 | 7 | 7 | 3 | 5 | 8 | 6 | 7 | 7 | 8 | 8 |
| Pau | 3 | 8 | 5 | 3 | 3 | 6 | 11 | 8 | 4 | 10 | 12 | 10 | 11 | 11 | 13 | 14 | 12 |
| Racing 92 | 10 | 7 | 6 | 10 | 13 | 10 | 9 | 13 | 9 | 11 | 10 | 7 | 5 | 3 | 3 | 5 | 3 |
| Stade Français | 14 | 13 | 11 | 13 | 14 | 14 | 14 | 14 | 14 | 14 | 14 | 14 | 13 | 14 | 12 | 13 | 14 |
| Toulon | 2 | 6 | 10 | 6 | 11 | 7 | 7 | 5 | 5 | 5 | 3 | 3 | 3 | 5 | 4 | 4 | 4 |
| Toulouse | 9 | 12 | 9 | 12 | 10 | 13 | 5 | 11 | 8 | 4 | 4 | 4 | 7 | 6 | 8 | 6 | 7 |

| Leader, semi-final play-off places and receive berths in the 2020–21 European Rugby Champions Cup |
| Semi-final play-off places and receive berths in the 2020–21 European Rugby Champions Cup |
| Quarter-final play-off places, and receive berths in the Champions Cup. |
| Qualification to relegation play-off |
| Relegation to Rugby Pro D2 |

Source: Ligue Nationale de Rugby

== Results by round ==
| Team ╲ Round | 1 | 2 | 3 | 4 | 5 | 6 | 7 | 8 | 9 | 10 | 11 | 12 | 13 | 14 | 15 | 16 | 17 |
|---|---|---|---|---|---|---|---|---|---|---|---|---|---|---|---|---|---|
| Agen | L | W | L | W | L | L | D | W | L | L | L | L | L | W | L | W | L |
| Bayonne | W | L | L | W | W | W | W | L | L | L | D | L | L | L | L | W | W |
| Bordeaux Bègles | W | W | W | W | D | L | W | L | W | W | W | W | W | L | W | W | W |
| Brive | L | L | W | L | W | W | L | W | L | W | D | L | L | W | L | L | W |
| Castres | W | L | L | L | W | W | L | L | W | L | W | L | L | L | W | W | L |
| Clermont | W | W | L | L | W | W | L | W | L | W | L | W | L | W | W | L | W |
| La Rochelle | L | W | L | W | L | L | W | W | L | W | L | W | W | W | L | W | L |
| Lyon | W | W | W | W | W | W | W | L | W | L | L | W | W | W | L | W | L |
| Montpellier | L | W | W | L | D | L | L | W | D | W | L | D | W | L | W | L | L |
| Pau | W | L | W | W | L | L | L | W | W | L | L | L | L | L | L | L | W |
| Racing 92 | L | W | L | L | L | W | D | L | W | L | W | W | W | W | W | L | W |
| Stade Français | L | L | W | L | L | L | W | L | L | L | W | D | W | L | W | L | L |
| Toulon | W | L | L | W | L | W | L | W | D | W | W | D | W | L | W | L | W |
| Toulouse | L | L | W | L | W | L | W | L | W | W | W | D | L | W | L | W | L |

W = Win; D = Draw; L = Loss

== Leading scorers ==
Note: Flags to the left of player names indicate national team as has been defined under World Rugby eligibility rules, or primary nationality for players who have not yet earned international senior caps. Players may hold one or more non-WR nationalities.

=== Top points scorers ===
As of 1 March 2020

| Rank | Player | Club | Games | Points |
|---|---|---|---|---|
| 1 | (France) Thomas Laranjeira | Brive | 14 | 181 |
| 2 | (France) Anthony Belleau | Toulon | 15 | 171 |
| 3 | (France) Antoine Hastoy | Pau | 14 | 139 |
| 4 | (France) Teddy Iribaren | Racing | 16 | 126 |
| 5 | (France) Julien Dumora | Castres | 12 | 123 |
| 6 | (France) Jonathan Wisniewski | Lyon | 12 | 122 |
| 7 | (Australia) Jake McIntyre | Clermont | 9 | 109 |
| 8 | (New Zealand) Ben Botica | Bordeaux Bègles | 13 | 101 |
| 9 | (France) Matthieu Jalibert | Bordeaux Bègles | 9 | 97 |
| 10 | (Australia) Zack Holmes | Toulouse | 8 | 94 |

=== Top try scorers ===
As of 1 March 2020

| Rank | Player | Club | Games | Tries |
|---|---|---|---|---|
| 1 | (France) Arthur Retière | La Rochelle | 13 | 9 |
| 2 | (Fiji) Nemani Nadolo | Montpellier | 7 | 7 |
| 2 | (France) Kylan Hamdaoui | Stade Français | 16 | 7 |
| 2 | (France) Thomas Combezou | Castres | 17 | 7 |
| 5 | (France) Teddy Thomas | Racing | 7 | 6 |
| 5 | (France) Xavier Mignot | Lyon | 12 | 6 |
| 5 | (Argentina) Juan Imhoff | Racing | 13 | 6 |
| 8 | (Fiji) Semi Radradra | Bordeaux Bègles | 9 | 5 |
| 8 | (France) Loris Tolot | Agen | 10 | 5 |
| 8 | (France) Martin Laveau | Castres | 12 | 5 |
| 8 | (France) Anthony Bouthier | Montpellier | 13 | 5 |
| 8 | (France) Daniel Ikpefan | Toulon | 13 | 5 |
| 8 | (France) Joris Jurand | Brive | 14 | 5 |
| 8 | (France) Thibaut Regard | Lyon | 14 | 5 |
| 8 | (New Zealand) Toby Arnold | Lyon | 15 | 5 |
| 8 | (Portugal) Samuel Marques | Pau | 15 | 5 |
| 8 | (South Africa) Johann Sadie | Agen | 15 | 5 |

== Attendances ==
- Attendances do not include the semi-finals or final as these are at neutral venues.

| Club | Home Games | Total | Average | Highest | Lowest | % Capacity |
|---|---|---|---|---|---|---|
| Agen | 9 | 74,809 | 8,312 | 13,500 | 6,009 | 59% |
| Bayonne | 9 | 129,795 | 14,422 | 16,630 | 12,517 | 85% |
| Bordeaux Bègles | 9 | 220,662 | 24,518 | 38,503 | 17,172 | 68% |
| Brive | 9 | 97,306 | 10,812 | 12,273 | 9,457 | 68% |
| Castres | 8 | 79,525 | 9,941 | 10,724 | 9,325 | 80% |
| Clermont | 8 | 134,530 | 16,816 | 18,804 | 14,957 | 88% |
| La Rochelle | 8 | 128,000 | 16,000 | 16,000 | 16,000 | 100% |
| Lyon | 9 | 130,301 | 14,478 | 16,256 | 10,778 | 58% |
| Montpellier | 8 | 91,738 | 11,467 | 16,153 | 8,000 | 63% |
| Pau | 9 | 100,752 | 11,195 | 16,153 | 8,000 | 61% |
| Racing | 9 | 135,384 | 15,043 | 26,292 | 7,102 | 49% |
| Stade Francais | 7 | 72,499 | 10,357 | 14,050 | 8,000 | 52% |
| Toulon | 9 | 122,371 | 13,597 | 17,287 | 12,124 | 75% |
| Toulouse | 8 | 167,253 | 20,907 | 33,000 | 14,573 | 90% |

== See also ==
- 2019–20 Rugby Pro D2 season
