= Clément Castets =

French rugby union player

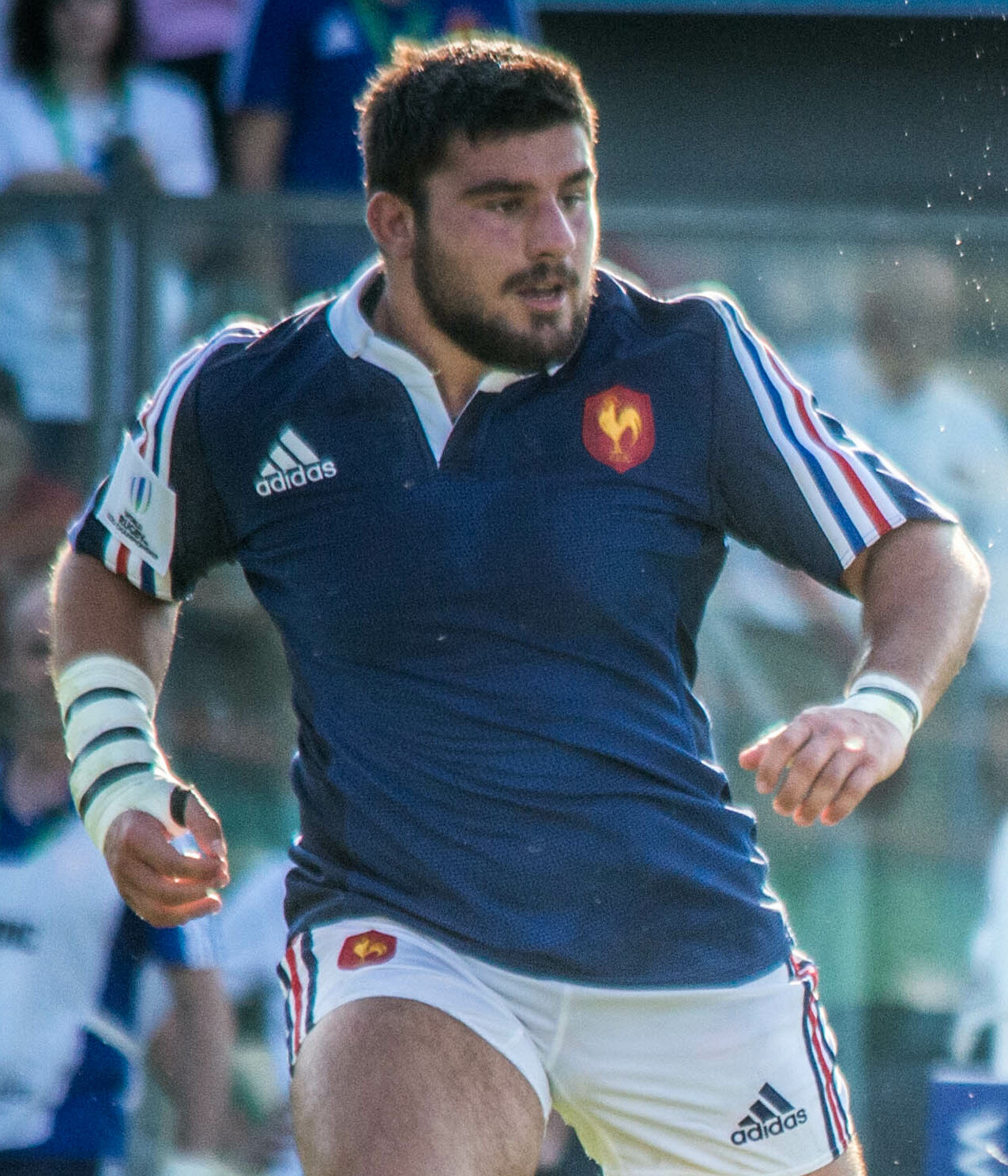
- Born: 5 May 1996 (age 30) Toulouse, France
- Height: 1.81 m (5 ft 11 in)
- Weight: 110 kg (243 lb; 17 st 5 lb)

Rugby union career
- Position: Prop
- Current team: Hawke's Bay, Crusaders
Senior career
Years	Team	Apps	(Points)
2017–2021	Toulouse	74	(10)
2021–25	Stade Français	60	(10)
2026	Hawke's Bay	10	(5)
2027	Crusaders	0	(0)
- Correct as of 19 November 2026
International career
Years	Team	Apps	(Points)
2015–2016	France U20	15	(10)
- Correct as of 25 June 2016

Clément Castets (born 5 May 1996) is a French professional rugby union player who plays as a prop for Hawke's Bay in New Zealand's National Provincial Championship and the Crusaders in Super Rugby.

== Club career ==
On 26 August 2017, Clément Castets played his first game for Toulouse. In the following seasons, he won the 2018–19 Top 14 and the 2020–21 Top 14 as well as the 2020–21 Champions Cup.

On 10 May 2021, he chose to leave his first professional club and signed with Stade Français. He joined the French capital side after the 2020–21 Top 14 season.

Castets moved to New Zealand in 2025, where he signed with Manawatu for the 2025 Bunnings NPC season. However, he suffered a shoulder injury during pre-season that ruled him out for the entire season. He then settled in Christchurch and played for the Sumner Rugby Club.

On 4 July 2026, the Hawke's Bay Rugby Union announced that it had signed Castets for the 2026 NPC season. He made his debut for the Magpies on 2 August 2026 in their round 1 game against Wellington. He scored a try in their 52–33 victory.

After the NPC season, on 28 October 2026, Castets was named in the Crusaders squad for the 2027 Super Rugby Pacific season as a injury replacement for Tamaiti Williams, who was expected to miss a part of the season.

== International career ==
On 17 October 2022, Castets was named in the France national team for the 2022 Autumn internationals.

== Honours ==
Toulouse

- European Rugby Champions Cup: 2021

Toulouse

- Top 14: 2019, 2021
