= Jérôme Garcès =

French rugby union referee (born 1973)

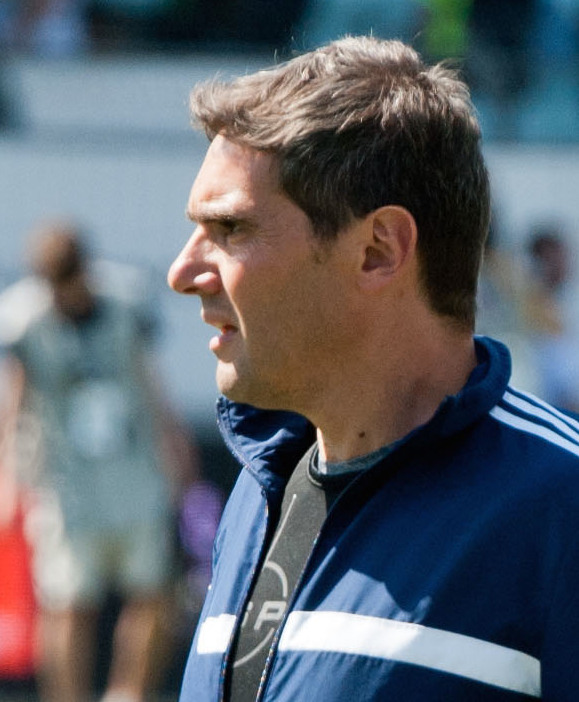
- Garcès before a Top 14 match in 2015
- Born: 24 October 1973 (age 53) Pau, France

Rugby union career
Refereeing career
Years	Competition	Apps
2006–2019	Top 14	
2006–2018	Challenge Cup	
2008–2019	Heineken Cup/ERCC	
2009	IRB Junior World Championship	
2010–2019	Test matches	
2011–2019	Six Nations Championship	
2013–2019	The Rugby Championship	
2015–2019	Rugby World Cup	
2017	British & Irish Lions tour	

Jérôme Garcès (born 24 October 1973) is a French former international and professional rugby union referee who currently works as a discipline and refereeing advisor for the France national team.

Originally from Béarn, France, he was a regular referee in the Top 14 and also officiated in the European EPCR Challenge Cup and Champions Cup competitions for a long time. At international level, Garcès refereed matches at the Six Nations Championship, The Rugby Championship as well as the Rugby World Cup, and in 2019 became the first French referee to take charge of the World Cup final, after which he retired.

Regarded at the time as one of the best officials in the world, he was renowned for his pedagogy and his intent to protect the players' physical integrity and welfare.

== Biography ==
Jérôme Garcès was born on 24 October 1973 in Pau, France and played as a wing at an amateur level in his hometown club of Arudy. After a hand injury occurring in 1994, he started to officiate and became a Top 14 match referee in 2006. He made his first full international appearance in 2009, by refereeing the 2009 Junior World Championship in Japan. He joined the IRB referees elite panel next year, after four years of elite level officiating. His international senior test debut was between England and Barbarians in the 2010 mid-year tests.

In 2011, Garcès made his debut as match official in the Six Nations Championship. Having been appointed as an assistant referee in the annual Calcutta Cup match between Scotland and England, he became match referee in the 58th minute after the original referee Romain Poite was injured during play. Later this year, Garcès was named as an assistant referee for the 2011 Rugby World Cup, and served as touch judge for four matches – Ireland v Russia, Fiji v Namibia, Samoa v Namibia and Wales v Namibia.

Garcès took charge of the England v Italy match in the 2012 Six Nations Championship. He also refereed matches between British & Irish Lions and club teams during the 2013 Lions tour to Australia. In 2015 he refereed Japan's memorable victory over South Africa at Brighton's Falmer Stadium during the World Cup. He later refereed his first World Cup semi-final when he took charge of the New Zealand vs South Africa game.

In 2017, he was chosen to referee at the Lions Tour to New Zealand. After being appointed as an assistant referee for the first game, he officiated in the second test and showed a red card to Sonny Bill Williams in the 24th minute after a shoulder charge to the head of Lions wing Anthony Watson. His decision was heavily criticised by New Zealand supporters but backed by pundits and former referees.

In 2019, he was one of the referees at the 2019 Rugby World Cup and also became the first French referee to take charge of the final after which he retired.

In 2021, Garcès joined the France national team coaching staff as a discipline and refereeing advisor.

== Finals record ==
Date	Teams		Score	Fixture	Venue
1 June 2013	(France) Toulon	(France) Castres	14–19	2013 Top 14 final	Stade de France, Saint-Denis
23 May 2014	(England) Bath	(England) Northampton Saints	16–30	2014 European Challenge Cup final	(Wales) Cardiff Arms Park, Cardiff
1 May 2015	(Scotland) Edinburgh	(England) Gloucester	13–19	2015 European Rugby Challenge Cup final	(England) Twickenham Stoop, London
11 May 2018	(Wales) Cardiff Blues	(England) Gloucester	31–30	2018 European Rugby Challenge Cup final	(Spain) San Mamés, Bilbao
2 June 2018	(France) Montpellier	(France) Castres	13–29	2018 Top 14 final	Stade de France, Saint-Denis
11 May 2019	(England) Saracens	(Ireland) Leinster	20–10	2019 European Rugby Champions Cup final	(England) St James' Park, Newcastle upon Tyne
15 June 2019	(France) Toulouse	(France) Clermont	24–18	2019 Top 14 final	Stade de France, Saint-Denis
2 November 2019	England	South Africa	12–32	2019 Rugby World Cup final	(Japan) International Stadium Yokohama, Yokohama
