= Stade Armandie =

Multi-purpose stadium in Agen, France

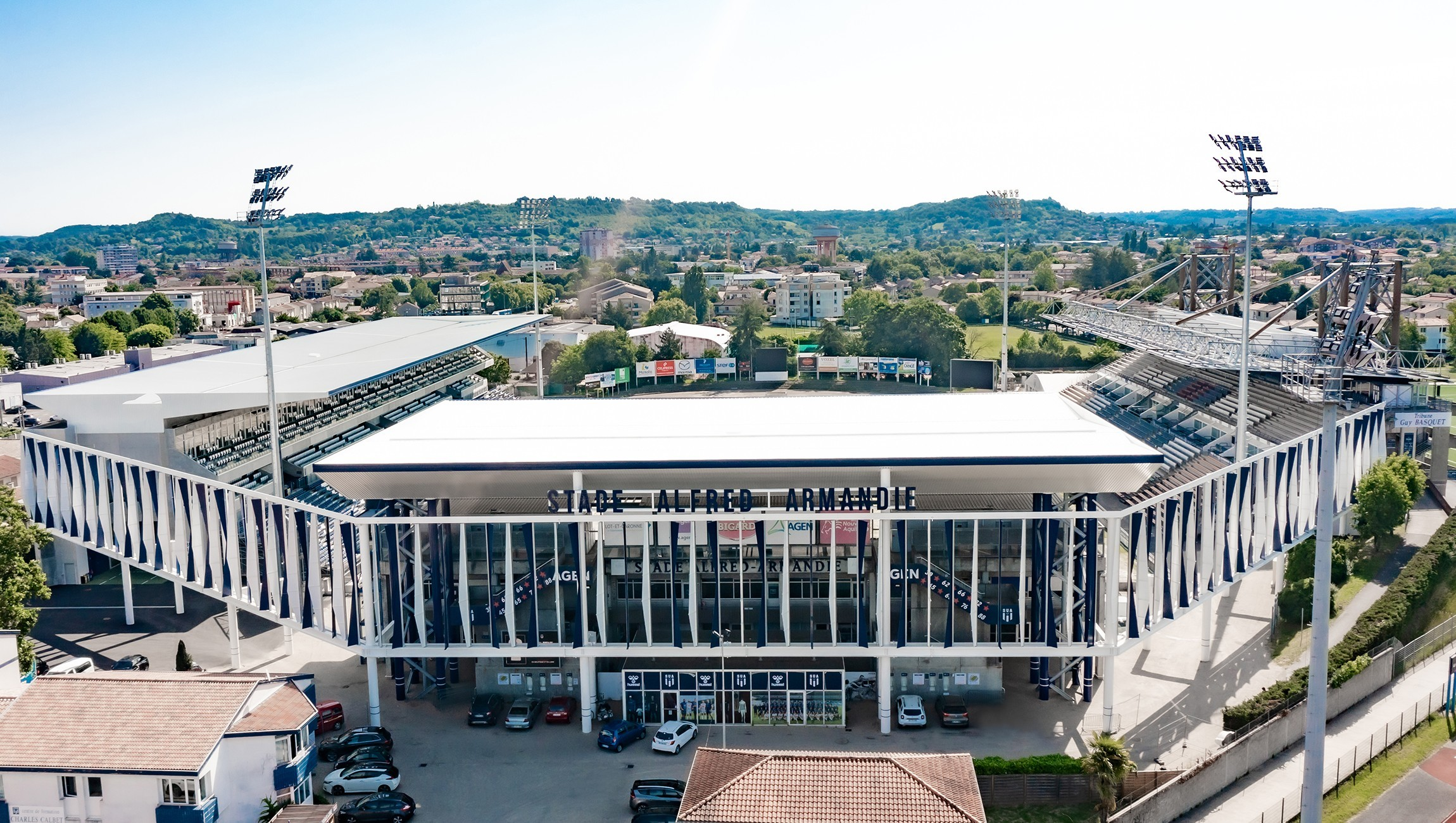
- Interactive map of Stade Armandie
- Coordinates: 44°11′33″N 0°37′14″E
- Owner: City of Agen
- Capacity: 14,400
- Surface: Grass

Construction
- Built: 1921
- Opened: October 9, 1921
- Renovated: 2008 to 2010
- Expanded: 1972, 1991, 2007

Tenant
- SU Agen

Stade Armandie is a multi-purpose stadium in Agen, France. It is currently used mostly for rugby union matches and is the home stadium of SU Agen. The stadium is able to hold 14,400 people.
