= Sofiane Guitoune =

France international rugby union player

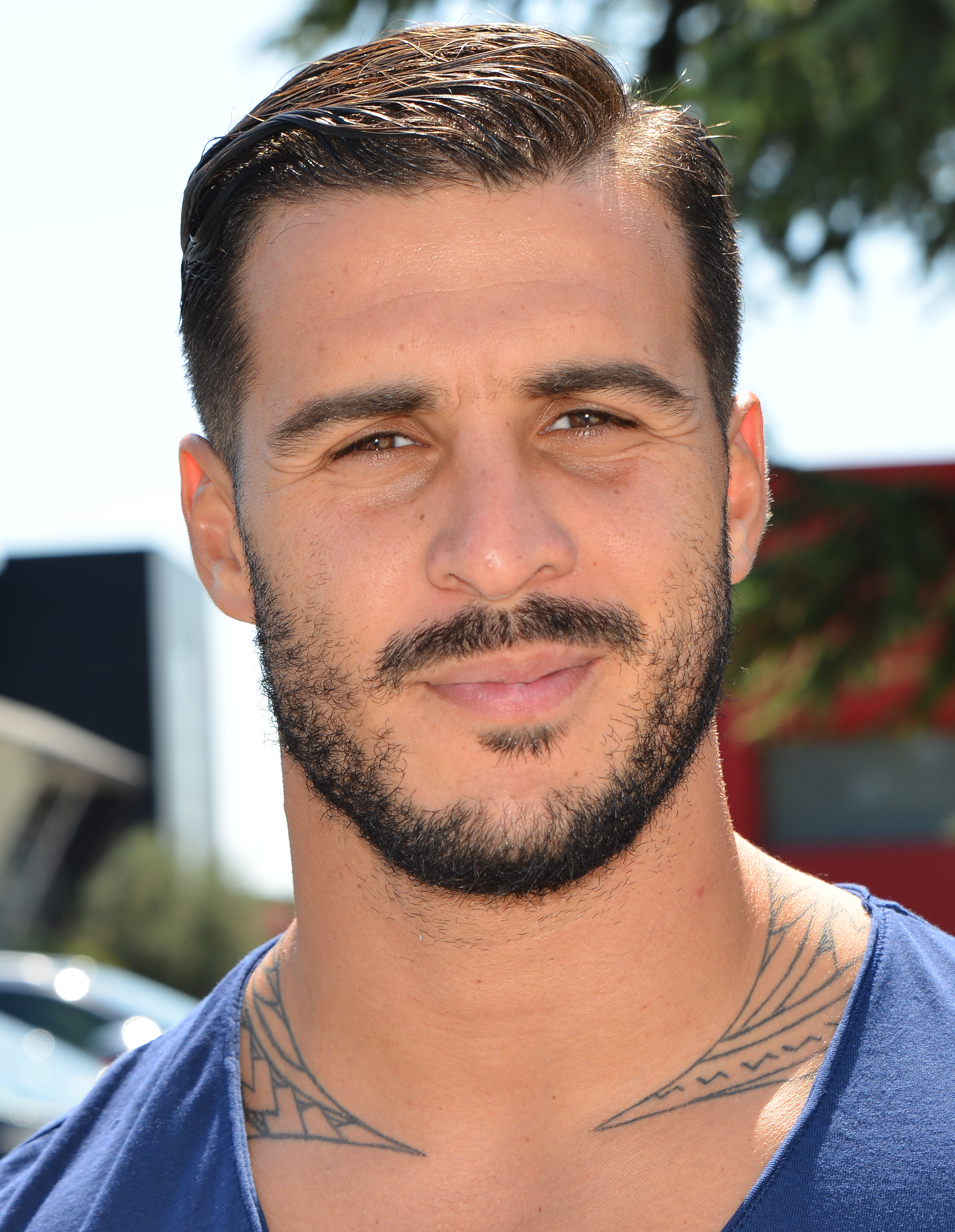
- Born: 27 March 1989 (age 37) Algiers, Algeria
- Height: 1.84 m (6 ft 1/2 in)
- Weight: 97 kg (15 st 4 lb; 214 lb)

Rugby union career
- Position: Center / Wing
Senior career
Years	Team	Apps	(Points)
2007–2010	Agen	42	(25)
2010–2012	Albi	56	(83)
2012–2014	Perpignan	22	(50)
2014–2016	Bordeaux-Bègles	33	(40)
2016–	Toulouse	101	(130)
- Correct as of 13 September 2022
International career
Years	Team	Apps	(Points)
2013–	France	9	(15)
- Correct as of 6 October 2019

Sofiane Guitoune (born 27 March 1989) is a French rugby union player. His position is fullback and he currently plays for Toulouse in the Top 14. He began his career with Agen, spent two seasons at Albi before moving to USA Perpignan in 2012.

Sofiane's mother was born in Vierzon, France, where his family of 5 returned to when Sofiane was 2 years old in June 1991 to live with his maternal grandmother, Djoher, who had remained in the town.

== Honours ==
Toulouse

- European Rugby Champions Cup: 2024
