= Pascal Gaüzère =

French rugby union referee

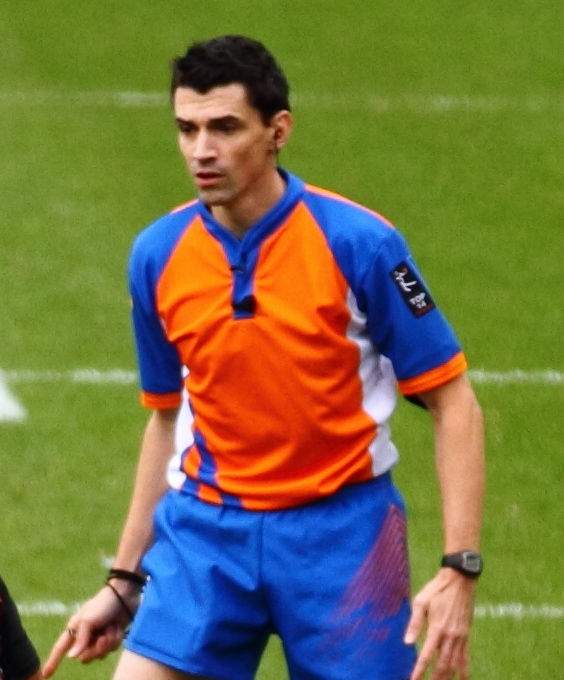
- Born: Pascal Gaüzère; 23 April 1977 (age 49) France

Rugby union career
Refereeing career
Years	Competition	Apps
2006–2021	Top 14	
2010–2019	IRB Junior World Championship	
2010–2021	Test Matches	
2014–2021	Six Nations	
2015–2019	Rugby World Cup	

Pascal Gaüzère (born 23 April 1977) is a retired referee from Montfort-en-Chalosse in France who represented the French Rugby Federation at international level in refereeing. He officiated at the highest level from 2006 to 2021, refereeing matches in the club tournaments, Top 14, Pro12, Challenge Cup, and Heineken Cup.

He made his international refereeing debut in 2009, when he refereed the match between Tonga under-20s and Wales under-20s in the 2009 IRB Junior World Championship. He was once again on the IRB panel for the 2010 IRB Junior World Championship, refereeing several matches including the final between Australia under-20s and New Zealand under-20s.

In late 2010, Gaüzère made his debut at professional level, touch judging and refereeing in four matches in the 2010 end-of-year rugby union tests. His first match as match referee was between Georgia and Canada. Later on he was part of the 2011 Rugby World Cup qualifying match between Romania and Uruguay. On 4 December 2010, Gaüzère refereed 'The Final Challenge' between Barbarians and South Africa, which the "Baa Baas" won, 26–20.

He made his Six Nations debut in 2011, when he was one of the officials in the Scotland and Ireland match in the 2011 Six Nations Championship.

Gaüzère retired from refereeing in June 2021. His final game was a Test match between the British and Irish Lions and Japan.
