= Mathieu Raynal =

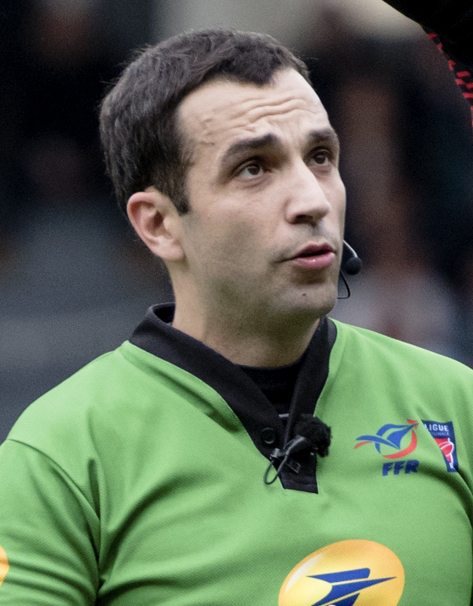
- Born: Mathieu Raynal; 9 August 1981 (age 45) Perpignan, France

Rugby union career
Refereeing career
Years	Competition	Apps
2005–2007	Rugby Pro D2	16
2007–	Top 14	67
2010–	Challenge Cup	7
2012–	Champions Cup	7
2009–	Test Matches	6
- Correct as of end of 2012-13 season

Mathieu Raynal (born 9 August 1981) is a former professional rugby union referee. He officiated at the highest level in the Top 14, European club rugby, and was on the World Rugby referee panel.

== Playing career ==
Raynal was born in Perpignan, France, and played for USA Perpignan and was part of the successful 1998 Junior Perpignan team that won the Junior Championships in France. He joined a local referees society in 2001, while representing the first XV from the University of Perpignan in 2001.

== Refereeing career ==
By the age of 25, Raynal had officiated at amateur rugby matches in the Fédérale 3, Fédérale 2 and Fédérale 1, and was promoted to Rugby Pro D2, the second division of professional rugby in France. His first professional game as a match official was between Grenoble and Toulon in the 2006–07 Rugby Pro D2 season, and was named on the Top 14 refereeing panel for the 2007–08 season. He was appointed by World Rugby, then known as the International Rugby Board, to the refereeing panel for the 2011 IRB Junior World Championship in Italy, where he refereed four matches: Italy U20 v Argentina U20, South Africa U20 v Scotland U20, Scotland U20 v Tonga U20 and 9th place game Scotland U20 v Argentina U20.

Mathieu Raynal's first Test Match as head official was between Malta and Netherlands in the 2008–10 European Nations Cup Second Division. However his first match in charge of a tier 1 fixture, was the 24 November 2012 Autumn international clash between Scotland and Tonga in Aberdeen. Before this match, he had been a touch judge for the England clash with Australia a week before the Scotland-Tonga clash.

On 8 March 2013, Raynal was the referee for the Montpellier home game against Racing Métro in the 2012–13 Top 14 season. However at the 56th minute François van der Merwe fell onto his legs in an attempt to tackle Julien Tomas, and Raynal suffered a double fracture to his tibia and fibula. He was unable to referee a match for almost a year. He returned to refereeing on 8 February 2014 for the Toulouse away clash with Montpellier. He made his international Test match return on 22 March 2014 for the 2015 RWC Americas qualifier match between Uruguay and the United States.

He refereed the first of the Bledisloe Cup matches between Australia and New Zealand in 2022.
