= 2016–17 European Rugby Champions Cup pool stage =

- Season: 2016–17 European Rugby Champions Cup
- Date: 14 October 2016 – 22 January 2017

Qualifiers
- Seed 1: (France) Clermont
- Seed 2: (Ireland) Munster
- Seed 3: (England) Saracens
- Seed 4: (Ireland) Leinster
- Seed 5: (England) Wasps
- Seed 6: (Scotland) Glasgow Warriors
- Seed 7: (France) Toulouse
- Seed 8: (France) Toulon

The 2016–17 European Rugby Champions Cup pool stage was the first stage of the 22nd season of European club rugby union, and the third under the European Rugby Champions Cup format.

It involved 20 teams competing, across 5 pools of 4 teams, for 8 quarter-final places – awarded to the 5 pool winners and the 3 top-ranked pool runners-up.

The pool stage began on the weekend of 14–16 October 2016, and ended following Round 6, on the weekend of 23–25 January 2017.

== Seeding ==
The 20 competing teams are seeded and split into four tiers, each containing 5 teams.

For the purpose of creating the tiers, clubs are ranked based on their domestic league performances and on their qualification for the knockout phases of their championships, so a losing quarter-finalist in the Top 14 would be seeded below a losing semi-finalist, even if they finished above them in the regular season.

Rank	Top 14	Premiership	Pro 12
1	(France) Racing 92	(England) Saracens	(Ireland) Connacht
2	(France) Toulon	(England) Exeter Chiefs	(Ireland) Leinster
3	(France) Clermont	(England) Wasps	(Scotland) Glasgow Warriors
4	(France) Montpellier	(England) Leicester Tigers	(Ireland) Ulster
5	(France) Toulouse	(England) Northampton Saints	(Wales) Scarlets
6	(France) Castres	(England) Sale Sharks	(Ireland) Munster
7	(France) Bordeaux Bègles		(Italy) Zebre

Based on these seedings, teams are placed into one of the four tiers, with the top seed clubs being put in Tier 1. The nature of the tier system means that a draw is needed to allocate two of the three second seed clubs to Tier 1. Exeter Chiefs and Leinster were drawn into Tier 1, meaning the remaining side - Toulon went into Tier 2. As a result of this draw, Montpellier also entered Tier 2, as the fourth seed from the league of the second seed placed in Tier 2. The other two fourth rankes sides fell into Tier 3.

The tiers are shown below. Brackets show each team's seeding and their league (for example, 1 Top 14 indicates the team was seeded 1st from the Top 14).

Tier 1	(England) Saracens (1 AP)	(Ireland) Connacht (1 Pro12)	(France) Racing 92 (1 Top 14)	(England) Exeter Chiefs (2 AP)	(Ireland) Leinster (2 Pro12)
Tier 2	(France) Toulon (2 Top 14)	(England) Wasps (3 AP)	(Scotland) Glasgow Warriors (3 Pro12)	(France) Clermont (3 Top 14)	(France) Montpellier (4 Top 14)
Tier 3	(England) Leicester Tigers (4 AP)	(Ireland) Ulster (4 Pro12)	(England) Northampton Saints (5 AP)	(Wales) Scarlets (5 Pro12)	(France) Toulouse (5 Top 14)
Tier 4	(England) Sale Sharks (6 AP)	(Ireland) Munster (6 Pro12)	(France) Castres (6 Top 14)	(Italy) Zebre (7 Pro12)	(France) Bordeaux Bègles (7 Top 14)

== Pool stage ==
The draw took place on 29 June 2016 in Neuchâtel, Switzerland.

During the pool stage, the teams played the 3 other teams in their pool twice, both at home and away, Based on the result of the match, teams receive competition points as follows:

- 4 points for a win,
- 2 points for a draw,
- 1 attacking bonus point for scoring four or more tries in a match,
- 1 defensive bonus point for losing a match by seven points or less.

Following the pool stage, the five winners from each group progressed to the quarter-finals, along with the three best pool runners-up from the competition (the three of the five runners-up with the highest number of competition points). To seed the quarter-finals, the five pool winners will be ranked 1st to 5th and the three best-placed runners-up ranked 6th to 8th, based on who got the most competition points. In the event of a tie between two or more teams from the same pool, the following criteria would be used as tie-breakers:

1. The club with the greater number of competition points from only matches involving tied teams.
2. If equal, the club with the best aggregate points difference from those matches.
3. If equal, the club that scored the most tries in those matches.

If this did not separate teams, and/or the tie related to teams that did not play each other (i.e., in different pools), the following tie breakers would be used:

1. If equal, the club with the best aggregate points difference from the pool stage.
2. The club that scored the most tries in the pool stage.
3. If equal, the club with the fewest players suspended in the pool stage.
4. If equal, the drawing of lots will determine a club's ranking.

Key to colours
Winner of each pool, advance to quarter-finals.
Three highest-scoring second-place teams advance to quarter-finals.
Cannot advance to the quarter-finals.

=== Pool 1 ===
Team	P	W	D	L	PF	PA	Diff	TF	TA	TB	LB	Pts
(Ireland) Munster (2)	6	5	0	1	160	64	+96	18	4	3	1	24
(Scotland) Glasgow Warriors (6)	6	4	0	2	160	86	+74	18	10	2	1	19
(England) Leicester Tigers	6	2	0	4	61	190	–129	3	23	0	0	8
(France) Racing 92	6	1	0	5	89	130	–41	12	14	1	0	5

14 October 2016
19:45

(1 BP) Glasgow Warriors (Scotland)	42–13	(England) Leicester Tigers
Try: Sarto (2) 24' c, 76' c Brown 28' c Pyrgos 33' m Bennett 68' c Con: Russell (4/5) 24', 28', 68', 76'; Pen: Hogg (1/2) 14'; Russell (2/2) 55', 67'	Report	Try: Thompstone 20' c Con: O. Williams (1/1) 20'; Pen: O. Williams (2/2) 8', 37'

Scotstoun Stadium
Attendance: 7,351
Referee: Mathieu Raynal (FFR)

16 October 2016
16:15

Racing 92 (France)	P–P (Note: Due to the death of Munster head coach Anthony Foley, the match was postponed as a mark of respect.)	(Ireland) Munster

Stade Yves-du-Manoir
Referee: Wayne Barnes (RFU)

22 October 2016
13:00

(1 BP) Munster (Ireland)	38–17	(Scotland) Glasgow Warriors
Try: Bleyendaal 4' c Taute 14' c Zebo 30' c Penalty try 47' c Scannell 75' c Con: Bleyendaal (4/4) 4', 14', 30', 47'; Keatley (1/1) 75'; Pen: Bleyendaal (1/1) 7'	Report	Try: MacArthur 66' c Bennett 70' c Con: S. Hogg (2/2) 66', 70'; Pen: Russell (1/2) 10'

Thomond Park
Attendance: 25,600
Referee: Jérôme Garcès (FFR)

23 October 2016
17:30

Leicester Tigers (England)	27–17	(France) Racing 92
Try: O'Connor 2' m Burns 68' c Con: Burns (1/1) 68'; Pen: O. Williams (2/3) 23', 39'; Burns (3/3) 63', 66', 78'	Report	Try: Carter 49' c Imhoff 75' c Con: Carter (2/2) 49', 75'; Pen: Carter (1/1) 9'

Welford Road
Attendance: 19,048
Referee: Marius Mitrea (FIR)

10 December 2016
15:15

(1 BP) Munster (Ireland)	38–0	(England) Leicester Tigers
Try: Zebo 35' c Taute (2) 49' c, 56' m Penalty try 71' c Con: Bleyendaal (3/4) 36', 50', 71'; Pen: Bleyendaal (4/5) 10', 15', 23', 27'	Report

Thomond Park
Attendance: 25,600
Referee: Romain Poite (FFR)

10 December 2016
16:15

Racing 92 (France)	14–23	(Scotland) Glasgow Warriors
Try: Imhoff 7' c Carter 72' c Con: Carter (2/2) 8', 72'	Report	Try: Dunbar 29' c Price 41' c Con: Russell (2/2) 30', 42'; Pen: Russell (3/3) 10', 14', 65'

Stade Yves-du-Manoir
Attendance: 8,872
Referee: JP Doyle (RFU)

16 December 2016
19:45

Glasgow Warriors (Scotland)	23–7	(France) Racing 92
Try: Strauss 3' m Brown 13' c Price 46' m Con: Russell (1/3) 14'; Pen: Russell (2/2) 29', 38'	Report	Try: Chauveau 78' c Con: Dambielle (1/1) 79'

Scotstoun Stadium
Attendance: 7,351
Referee: George Clancy (IRFU)

17 December 2016
15:15

Leicester Tigers (England)	18–16	(Ireland) Munster (1 BP)
Pen: O. Williams (6/6) 33', 39', 49', 54', 66', 79'	Report	Try: Scannell 74' c Con: Bleyendaal (1/1) 74'; Pen: Bleyendaal (3/5) 9', 18', 44'

Welford Road
Attendance: 24,213
Referee: Pascal Gaüzère (FFR)

7 January 2017
15:45

Racing 92 (France)	7–32	(Ireland) Munster (1 BP)
Try: Voisin 63' c Con: Carter (1/1) 64'	Report	Try: Zebo 22' m Stander 35' c Conway 39' c N. Scannell 54' c Con: Bleyendaal (3/4) 36', 40', 55'; Pen: Bleyendaal (2/2) 14, 33'

Stade Yves-du-Manoir
Attendance: 9,233
Referee: Matthew Carley (RFU)

14 January 2017
17:30

(1 BP) Glasgow Warriors (Scotland)	12–14	(Ireland) Munster
Pen: Russell (3/3) 13', 47', 59'; Hogg (1/2) 32'	Report	Try: Saili 71' m Pen: Bleyendaal (3/4) 20', 34', 50'

Scotstoun Stadium
Attendance: 7,351
Referee: Luke Pearce (RFU)

14 January 2017
20:45

(1 BP) Racing 92 (France)	34–3	(England) Leicester Tigers
Try: Chaveau 11' m Andreu (2) 16' c, 76' m Grobler 38' c Penalty try 44' c Con: Carter (3/5) 17', 39', 45'; Pen: Carter (1/2) 15'	Report	Pen: Burns (1/1) 34'

Stade Yves-du-Manoir
Attendance: 5,449
Referee: Ben Whitehouse (WRU)

21 January 2017
17:30

Leicester Tigers (England)	0–43	(Scotland) Glasgow Warriors (1 BP)
	Report	Try: Seymour 5' c Penalty try 21' c Bennett 29' c Gray 35' c Wilson 47' c Swinson 60' m Con: Russell (5/6) 5', 22', 30', 36', 48'; Pen: Russell (1/2) 12'

Welford Road
Attendance: 19,345
Referee: Mathieu Raynal (FFR)

21 January 2017
17:30

Munster (Ireland)	22–10	(France) Racing 92
Try: Zebo 36' c R. O'Mahony 48' c Keatley 69' m Con: Bleyendaal (2/3) 37', 49'; Pen: Bleyendaal (1/1) 42'	Report	Try: Chavancy 59' c Con: Machenaud (1/1) 60'; Pen: Machenaud (1/2) 40'

Thomond Park
Attendance: 26,200
Referee: Marius Mitrea (FIR)

=== Pool 2 ===
Team	P	W	D	L	PF	PA	Diff	TF	TA	TB	LB	Pts
(England) Wasps (5)	6	4	1	1	210	112	+98	28	13	3	1	22
(France) Toulouse (7)	6	3	1	2	164	91	+73	22	10	2	2	18
(Ireland) Connacht	6	4	0	2	188	118	+70	26	15	2	0	18
(Italy) Zebre	6	0	0	6	90	331	−241	11	49	0	0	0

15 October 2016
13:00

(1 BP) Wasps (England)	82–14	(Italy) Zebre
Try: Miller (2) 3' c, 26' c Cooper-Woolley 8' c Simpson (2) 14' c, 63' c Halai 28' c Johnson 39' c Daly 41' m Launchbury 54' c Bassett 58' c Gaskell 69' c Robson 72' c Con: Cipriani (6/7) 3', 8', 14', 26', 28', 39'; Gopperth (5/5) 54', 58', 63', 69', 72'	Report	Try: Ruzza (2) 18' c, 35' c Con: Padovani (2/2) 18', 35'

Ricoh Arena
Attendance: 10,701
Referee: Andrew Brace (IRFU)

15 October 2016
17:30

Connacht (Ireland)	23–21	(France) Toulouse (1 BP)
Try: Adeolokun 20' m O'Halloran 58' m Aki 66' c Con: Ronaldson (1/1) 66'; Pen: Carty (2/3) 25', 29'	Report	Try: David 34' m Doussain 37' c Con: Bézy (1/2) 37'; Pen: Bézy (2/4) 7', 11'; Fritz (1/1) 13'

Galway Sportsgrounds
Attendance: 8,091
Referee: Luke Pearce (RFU)

23 October 2016
16:15

Toulouse (France)	20–20	(England) Wasps
Try: Johnston 50' c Fickou 68' c Con: Bézy (2/2) 50', 68'; Pen: Bézy (2/2) 24', 31'	Report	Try: Bassett 62' c Hughes 78' c Con: Gopperth (2/2) 62', 78'; Pen: Gopperth (2/2) 18', 34'

Stade Ernest Wallon
Attendance: 14,206
Referee: George Clancy (IRFU)

23 October 2016
16:15

Zebre (Italy)	7–52	(Ireland) Connacht (1 BP)
Try: D'Apice 61' c Con: Padovani (1/1) 61'	Report	Try: Ili (3) 10' c, 41' c, 79' c Carty 13' c Penalty try 52' c Kelleher (2) 53' c, 74' m Carey 55' m Con: Ronaldson (6/8) 10', 13', 41', 52', 53', 79'

Stadio Sergio Lanfranchi
Attendance: 3,000
Referee: Mathieu Raynal (FFR)

10 December 2016
20:45

Zebre (Italy)	6–36	(France) Toulouse (1 BP)
Pen: Canna (2/2) 2', 9'	Report	Try: Bonneval (2) 16' m, 47' c Fickou 27' c Tekori 32' c Huget 40'+1 c Con: Bézy (4/5) 28', 33', 40'+2, 48'; Pen: Bézy (1/1) 5'

Stadio Sergio Lanfranchi
Attendance: 3,000
Referee: Ian Davies (WRU)

11 December 2016
13:00

(1 BP) Wasps (England)	32–17	(Ireland) Connacht
Try: Beale 6' c Hughes 43' c Launchbury 62' c Bassett 72' m Con: Gopperth (3/4) 7', 44', 63'; Pen: Gopperth (2/2) 22', 35'	Report	Try: Marmion 24' c Parata 45' c Con: Carty (2/2) 25', 46'; Pen: Carty (1/3) 18'

Ricoh Arena
Attendance: 13,364
Referee: Alexandre Ruiz (FFR)

17 December 2016
16:15

(1 BP) Toulouse (France)	54–15	(Italy) Zebre
Try: Galan 5' c Perez (2) 15' m, 56' c Huget 19' c Bonneval 22' c Flood 24' c Steenkamp 36' c David 61' c Con: Flood (7/8) 6', 20', 23', 25', 37', 57', 62'	Report	Try: D'Apice 2' c Meyer 44' m Con: Canna (1/2) 3'; Pen: Canna (1/1) 9'

Stadium Municipal
Attendance: 10,378
Referee: Ian Tempest (RFU)

17 December 2016
17:30

Connacht (Ireland)	20–18	(England) Wasps (1 BP)
Try: Poolman 39' c Dawai 80' c Con: Carty (2/2) 40', 80'; Pen: Carty (2/3) 8', 31'	Report	Try: Simpson 13' c Bassett 72' m Con: Gopperth (1/2) 13'; Pen: Gopperth (2/3) 53', 67'

Galway Sportsgrounds
Attendance: 8,090
Referee: Mathieu Raynal (FFR)
(for Jérôme Garcès (FFR))

Assistant referee Mathieu Raynal replaced the original referee Jérôme Garcès on the 73rd minute of the game after pulling a hamstring.

14 January 2017
13:00

(1 BP) Connacht (Ireland)	66–21	(Italy) Zebre
Try: Healy (2) 1' c, 41' c Cooney 18' c O'Halloran (2) 23' c, 43' c Bealham 27' c Marmion (2) 36' m, 54' c Ronaldson 39' c Blade 66' m Con: Cooney (8/10) 2', 19', 23', 29', 40', 42', 44', 55'	Report	Try: Meyer 6' c Ruzza 11' c Bellini 62' c Con: Canna (3/3) 7', 12', 62'

Galway Sportsgrounds
Attendance: 5,607
Referee: Tom Foley (RFU)

14 January 2017
15:15

Wasps (England)	17–14	(France) Toulouse (1 BP)
Try: Daly 61' c Robson 79' c Con: Gopperth (2/2) 62', 80'; Pen: Gopperth (1/2) 29'	Report	Try: Huget 51' c Penalty try 71' c Con: Doussain (2/2) 52', 72'

Ricoh Arena
Attendance: 17,248
Referee: John Lacey (IRFU)

22 January 2017
16:15

Toulouse (France)	19–10	(Ireland) Connacht
Try: Fickou 5' c Bonneval 17' c Tekori 46' m Con: Doussain (2/3) 6', 18'	Report	Try: Muldoon 53' c Con: Ronaldson (1/1) 54'; Pen: Ronaldson (1/2) 33'

Stadium Municipal
Attendance: 12,023
Referee: Wayne Barnes (RFU)

22 January 2017
16:15

Zebre (Italy)	27–41	(England) Wasps (1 BP)
Try: Bellini 13' c Baker 67' c Ruzza 79' c Con: Canna (2/2) 14', 68'; Violi (1/1) 80'; Pen: Canna (1/1) 8'; Violi (1/1) 24'	Report	Try: Johnson (2) 31' m, 52' c Cipriani 35' c Daly 40' c Wade 57' m Hughes 75' c Con: Cipriani (4/6) 36', 40', 53', 76'; Pen: Cipriani (1/1) 15'

Stadio Sergio Lanfranchi
Attendance: 2,500
Referee: David Wilkinson (IRFU)

=== Pool 3 ===
Team	P	W	D	L	PF	PA	Diff	TF	TA	TB	LB	Pts
(England) Saracens (3)	6	5	1	0	181	87	+94	20	6	2	0	24
(France) Toulon (8)	6	3	0	3	120	100	+20	12	10	2	2	16
(Wales) Scarlets	6	2	1	3	141	154	–13	11	15	0	1	11
(England) Sale Sharks	6	1	0	5	66	167	–101	7	19	0	0	4

15 October 2016
16:15

Toulon (France)	23–31	(England) Saracens
Try: Chilachava 55' c Habana 63' c Con: Halfpenny (2/2) 55', 63'; Pen: Halfpenny (3/3) 6', 29', 44'	Report	Try: Maitland 9' m Wigglesworth 14' c Wyles 38' c Con: Farrell (2/3) 14', 38'; Pen: Farrell (4/4) 3', 20', 46', 79'

Stade Mayol
Attendance: 14,103
Referee: John Lacey (IRFU)

15 October 2016
19:45

Scarlets (Wales)	28–11	(England) Sale Sharks
Try: G. Davies 12' c Van der Merwe (2) 31' m, 56' c Con: Patchell (2/3) 12', 57'; Pen: Patchell (3/4) 8', 14', 20'	Report	Try: Briggs 24' m Pen: Mugford (2/2) 3', 38'

Parc y Scarlets
Attendance: 6,521
Referee: Romain Poite (FFR)

21 October 2016
19:45

Sale Sharks (England)	5–15	(France) Toulon
Try: Odogwu 32' m	Report	Try: Ollivon 9' c Halfpenny 12' m Con: Halfpenny (1/2) 9'; Pen: Halfpenny (1/3) 6'

AJ Bell Stadium
Attendance: 9,402
Referee: Ben Whitehouse (WRU)

22 October 2016
17:30

(1 BP) Saracens (England)	44–26	(Wales) Scarlets
Try: M. Vunipola 11' c Tompkins 26' c Bosch 47' c Wyles 54' c Rhodes 75' c Con: Farrell (5/5) 11', 26', 47', 54', 75'; Pen: Farrell (3/3) 23', 36', 55'	Report	Try: A. Shingler 60' c J. Davies 73' c Con: Patchell (2/2) 60', 73'; Pen: Patchell (4/4) 7', 14', 31', 41'

Allianz Park
Attendance: 9,084
Referee: Pascal Gaüzère (FFR)

10 December 2016
17:30

(1 BP) Saracens (England)	50–3	(England) Sale Sharks
Try: Bosch 16' c Maitland (2) 25' c, 54' m George 46' m Wyles 50' c Barrington 72' c Con: Farrell (2/2) 18', 26'; Lozowski (2/4) 51', 73'; Pen: Farrell (3/3) 4', 6', 22'; Bosch (1/1) 40'+2	Report	Pen: MacGinty (1/1) 11'

Allianz Park
Attendance: 8,746
Referee: Mathieu Raynal (FFR)

11 December 2016
16:15

(1 BP) Toulon (France)	31–20	(Wales) Scarlets
Try: Gorgodze 4' c Halfpenny 25' c Taofifenua 29' c Guirado 51' c Con: Halfpenny (4/4) 5', 27', 31', 52'; Pen: Halfpenny (1/1) 11'	Report	Try: Owens 35' c Barclay 78' c Con: Patchell (2/2) 37', 78'; Pen: Patchell (2/2) 13', 24'

Stade Mayol
Attendance: 11,978
Referee: Greg Garner (RFU)

18 December 2016
13:00

Scarlets (Wales)	22–21	(France) Toulon (1 BP)
Try: S. Williams 14' c Con: Patchell (1/1) 15'; Pen: Patchell (5/5) 10', 18', 23', 44', 63'	Report	Pen: Halfpenny (7/11) 20', 28', 40', 46', 59', 65', 71'

Parc y Scarlets
Attendance: 8,579
Referee: Matthew Carley (RFU)

18 December 2016
17:30

Sale Sharks (England)	10–24	(England) Saracens
Try: Evans 78' c Con: MacGinty (1/1) 78'; Pen: MacGinty (1/1) 27'	Report	Try: Farrell 72' c Earle 77' m Con: Farrell (1/1) 73'; Pen: Farrell (4/6) 14', 35', 58', 68'

AJ Bell Stadium
Attendance: 6,158
Referee: Andrew Brace (IRFU)

15 January 2017
13:00

Scarlets (Wales)	22–22	(England) Saracens
Try: S. Williams 52' c Con: D. Jones (1/1) 53'; Pen: D. Jones (4/4) 8', 16', 35', 46'	Report	Try: Earle 12' m Ashton (2) 49' c, 80' c Con: Farrell (2/3) 50', 80'; Pen: Farrell (1/2) 71'

Parc y Scarlets
Attendance: 7,491
Referee: Alexandre Ruiz (FFR)

15 January 2017
16:15

(1 BP) Toulon (France)	27–12	(England) Sale Sharks
Try: Nonu 2' m Habana 59' c Pélissié 76' c Tuisova 79' m Con: Halfpenny (2/4) 60', 76'; Pen: Halfpenny (1/1) 43'	Report	Try: James 12' c Webber 62' m Con: Addison (1/2) 13'

Stade Mayol
Attendance: 12,315
Referee: George Clancy (IRFU)

21 January 2017
15:15

Sale Sharks (England)	25–23	(Wales) Scarlets (1 BP)
Try: Odogwu 10' m Addison 27' m Con: MacGinty (0/2); Pen: MacGinty (5/5) 2', 18', 48', 60', 76'	Report	Try: Van der Merwe 39' c Penalty try 63' c Con: D. Jones (2/2) 40', 63'; Pen: D. Jones (3/3) 31', 55', 73'

AJ Bell Stadium
Attendance: 4,275
Referee: Pascal Gaüzère (FFR)

21 January 2017
15:15

Saracens (England)	10–3	(France) Toulon (1 BP)
Try: Ashton 59' c Con: Farrell (1/2) 60'; Pen: Farrell (1/2) 31'	Report	Pen: Halfpenny (1/1) 66'

Allianz Park
Attendance: 10,000
Referee: Nigel Owens (WRU)

=== Pool 4 ===
Team	P	W	D	L	PF	PA	Diff	TF	TA	TB	LB	Pts
(Ireland) Leinster (4)	6	4	1	1	227	87	+140	31	10	4	1	23
(France) Montpellier	6	3	0	3	120	149	–29	15	15	2	2	16
(France) Castres	6	2	1	3	144	147	–3	15	20	1	1	12
(England) Northampton Saints	6	2	0	4	91	199	−108	10	26	1	0	9

15 October 2016
15:15

(1 BP) Leinster (Ireland)	33–15	(France) Castres
Try: Cronin (2) 9' m, 26' c McGrath 33' c Nacewa 48' c Penalty try 66' c Con: Nacewa (4/5) 26', 33', 48', 66'	Report	Try: Penalty try 41' c Jelonch 69' m Con: Urdapilleta (1/2) 41'; Pen: Urdapilleta (1/2) 30'

RDS Arena
Attendance: 13,890
Referee: Matthew Carley (RFU)

15 October 2016
17:30

Northampton Saints (England)	16–14	(France) Montpellier (1 BP)
Try: Clark 3' c Con: Myler (1/1) 3'; Pen: Myler (3/3) 18', 49', 80'	Report	Try: F. Steyn 35' m Pen: Botica (1/1) 30'; F. Steyn (2/2) 58', 65'

Franklin's Gardens
Attendance: 14,099
Referee: Nigel Owens (WRU)

22 October 2016
16:15

(1 BP) Castres (France)	41–7	(England) Northampton Saints
Try: D. Smith (2) 30' c, 43' c Tichit 40' c Bias 74' c Dupont 77' c Con: Urdapilleta (3/3) 30', 40', 43'; Dumora (2/2) 74', 77'; Pen: Urdapilleta (2/2) 10', 14'	Report	Try: J. Wilson 72'; Con: Myler (1/1) 72'

Stade Pierre-Antoine
Attendance: 8,405
Referee: Ian Davies (WRU)

23 October 2016
14:00

Montpellier (France)	22–16	(Ireland) Leinster (1 BP)
Try: Martin 29' c Nadolo (2) 35' c, 59' m Con: F. Steyn (2/3) 29', 35'; Pen: F. Steyn (1/1) 47'	Report	Try: Nacewa 80' c Con: Nacewa (1/1) 80'; Pen: Nacewa (3/3) 26', 52', 63'

Altrad Stadium
Attendance: 10,679
Referee: Luke Pearce (RFU)

9 December 2016
19:45

Northampton Saints (England)	10–37	(Ireland) Leinster (1 BP)
Try: Tuala 46' c Con: Myler (1/1) 46'; Pen: Myler (1/1) 16'	Report	Try: Ringrose 1' c O'Brien 56' c O'Loughlin 66' m Gibson-Park 75' c Nacewa 80' m Con: Nacewa (3/5) 1', 56', 75'; Pen: Nacewa (2/2) 11', 49'

Franklin's Gardens
Attendance: 15,151
Referee: Jérôme Garcès (FFR)

11 December 2016
14:00

(1 BP) Montpellier (France)	32–14	(France) Castres
Try: Nagusa 36' c Galletier 54' c Mamukashvili 67' c White 78' m Con: Steyn (3/3) 38', 56', 68'; Pen: Steyn (2/3) 9', 64'	Report	Try: Grosso 15' m Pen: Kockott (3/3) 3', 26', 41'

Altrad Stadium
Attendance: 11,260
Referee: Ben Whitehouse (WRU)

17 December 2016
19:45

(1 BP) Leinster (Ireland)	60–13	(England) Northampton Saints
Try: Byrne (2) 4' m, 31' c McGrath 28' c O'Brien 40' c Furlong 42' c Cronin 46' c Nacewa (2) 54' m, 70' m O'Loughlin 60' c Con: Nacewa (4/5) 29', 32', 40'+1, 43'; R. Byrne (2/4) 47', 61'; Pen: Nacewa (1/1) 24'	Report	Try: Pisi 20' c Con: Myler (1/1) 21'; Pen: Myler (2/3) 13', 16'

Aviva Stadium
Attendance: 38,584
Referee: Romain Poite (FFR)

18 December 2016
14:00

Castres (France)	29–23	(France) Montpellier (1 BP)
Try: Agulla 35' c Bias 64' c Con: Urdapilleta (2/2) 36', 66'; Pen: Urdapilleta (4/4) 3', 23', 30', 58'; Kockott (1/1) 73'	Report	Try: Qera 25' c Mogg 42' m Nadolo 54' m Con: Catrakilis (1/3) 26'; Pen: Catrakilis (2/3) 19', 48'

Stade Pierre-Antoine
Attendance: 8,300
Referee: Wayne Barnes (RFU)

13 January 2017
19:45

(1 BP) Leinster (Ireland)	57–3	(France) Montpellier
Try: Nacewa 14' c Conan (3) 23' c, 54' c, 69' m A. Byrne 28' c L. McGrath 63' c Healy 67' c Ringrose 74' c Con: Sexton (3/3) 16', 24', 55'; R. Byrne (4/5) 30', 64', 68', 75'; Pen: Nacewa (1/1) 26'	Report	Pen: Steyn (1/2) 20'

RDS Arena
Attendance: 17,585
Referee: JP Doyle (RFU)

14 January 2017
13:00

(1 BP) Northampton Saints (England)	28–21	(France) Castres (1 BP)
Try: Harrison (2) 2' c, 37' c Myler 32' c Wood 67' c Con: Myler (4/4) 3', 33', 39', 68'	Report	Try: Bias 29' m Dumora 48' c Con: Kockott (1/2) 49'; Pen: Kockott (3/4) 10', 55', 58'

Franklin's Gardens
Attendance: 13,645
Referee: Andrew Brace (IRFU)

20 January 2017
20:45

Castres (France)	24–24	(Ireland) Leinster
Try: Dupont 19' c Smith (2) 33' c, 52' c Con: Dumora (3/3) 21', 35', 52'; Pen: Dumora (1/1) 30'	Report	Try: Henshaw (2) 10' c, 42' c Leavy 63' c Con: Sexton (1/1) 10'; R. Byrne (2/2) 43', 64'; Pen: Sexton (1/1) 8'

Stade Pierre-Antoine
Attendance: 7,040
Referee: Greg Garner (RFU)

20 January 2017
20:45

(1 BP) Montpellier (France)	26–17	(England) Northampton Saints
Try: Galletier 9' c Nadolo (2) 50' c, 72' m W.J. du Plessis 59' c Con: Catrakilis (3/4) 10', 52', 61'	Report	Try: Dickson 29' c Kessell 76' c Con: Hanrahan (2/2) 30', 76'; Pen: Hanrahan (1/1) 35'

Altrad Stadium
Attendance: 4,900
Referee: John Lacey (IRFU)

=== Pool 5 ===
Team	P	W	D	L	PF	PA	Diff	TF	TA	TB	LB	Pts
(France) Clermont (1)	6	5	0	1	211	131	+80	26	18	5	1	26
(France) Bordeaux Bègles	6	3	0	3	118	120	–2	11	13	1	1	14
(England) Exeter Chiefs	6	2	0	4	110	146	–36	13	16	2	2	12
(Ireland) Ulster	6	2	0	4	131	173	–42	16	19	1	1	10

16 October 2016
14:00

Bordeaux Bègles (France)	28–13	(Ireland) Ulster
Try: Taofifénua 74' m Penalty try 77' c Connor 79' c Con: Beauxis (2/3) 77', 79'; Pen: Madigan (2/2) 3', 45'; Beauxis (1/1) 54'	Report	Try: Trimble 21' c Con: Jackson (1/1) 21'; Pen: Jackson (2/2) 39', 57'

Stade Chaban-Delmas
Attendance: 21,132
Referee: JP Doyle (RFU)

16 October 2016
17:30

Exeter Chiefs (England)	8–35	(France) Clermont (1 BP)
Try: S. Hill 79' m Pen: Steenson (1/1) 7'	Report	Try: Bardy 24' c Nakaitaci 28' c Fofana (2) 39' c, 69' c Abendanon 43' c Con: Parra (4/4) 24', 28', 39', 43'; Fernandez (1/1) 69'

Sandy Park
Attendance: 9,879
Referee: George Clancy (IRFU)

22 October 2016
16:15

(1 BP) Clermont (France)	49–33	(France) Bordeaux Bègles (1 BP)
Try: Nakaitaci 31' c Lapandry 42' m Fofana 48' c Vahaamahina 63' c Strettle 69' c Timani 77' c Con: Parra (4/5) 31', 48', 63', 69'; Fernandez (1/1) 77'; Pen: Parra (3/3) 8', 20', 25'	Report	Try: Buttin (2) 4' c, 67' m Spence 22' c Talebula 72' c Doubrere 80' c Con: Madigan (2/2) 4', 22'; Beauxis (2/3) 72', 80'

Stade Marcel-Michelin
Attendance: 17,965
Referee: Greg Garner (RFU)

22 October 2016
19:45

Ulster (Ireland)	19–18	(England) Exeter Chiefs (1 BP)
Try: Reidy 31' c Con: Jackson (1/1) 31'; Pen: Jackson (3/3) 5', 49', 71'; Drop: Jackson (1/1) 78'	Report	Pen: Steenson (5/5) 7', 29', 51', 67', 74'; Drop: Steenson (1/2) 77'

Kingspan Stadium
Attendance: 16,843
Referee: Alexandre Ruiz (FFR)

10 December 2016
13:00

(1 BP) Ulster (Ireland)	39–32	(France) Clermont (2 BP)
Try: Marshall (2) 6' c, 44' c Henderson 15' m Jackson 34' c Piutau 53' c Con: Jackson (4/5) 6', 35', 46', 54'; Pen: Jackson (2/2) 21', 57',	Report	Try: Yato 1' c Spedding 30' m Abendanon 62' c Chouly 73' c Con: Parra (3/4) 2', 62', 73'; Pen: Parra (2/2) 9', 26'

Kingspan Stadium
Attendance: 16,316
Referee: Wayne Barnes (RFU)

11 December 2016
17:30

(1 BP) Exeter Chiefs (England)	7–13	(France) Bordeaux Bègles
Try: Maunder 30' c Con: Steenson (1/1) 31'	Report	Try: Serin 56' c Con: Madigan (1/1) 56'; Pen: Serin (1/1) 36'; Beauxis (1/1) 64'

Sandy Park
Attendance: 9,143
Referee: Nigel Owens (WRU)

17 December 2016
14:00

Bordeaux Bègles (France)	12–20	(England) Exeter Chiefs
Pen: Beauxis (3/3) 23', 29', 44'; Serin (1/1) 65'	Report	Try: Waldrom 30' c Cowan-Dickie 68' c Con: Slade (2/2) 31', 69'; Pen: Slade (2/2) 54', 77'

Stade Chaban-Delmas
Attendance: 21,071
Referee: John Lacey (IRFU)

18 December 2016
16:15

(1 BP) Clermont (France)	38–19	(Ireland) Ulster
Try: Toeava 1' c Abendanon (2) 17' c, 23' c Lopez 41' c Penalty try 77' c Con: Parra (4/4) 2', 19', 24', 42'; Lopez (1/1) 78'; Pen: Lopez (1/1) 69'	Report	Try: Bowe (2) 56' c, 65' m Van der Merwe 61' c Con: Jackson (2/3) 57', 61'

Stade Marcel-Michelin
Attendance: 18,739
Referee: Marius Mitrea (FIR)

15 January 2017
14:00

(1 BP) Bordeaux Bègles (France)	6–9	(France) Clermont
Pen: Madigan (2/2) 12', 39'	Report	Pen: Lopez (3/4) 14', 36', 59'

Stade Chaban-Delmas
Attendance: 21,196
Referee: Nigel Owens (WRU)

15 January 2017
17:30

(1 BP) Exeter Chiefs (England)	31–19	(Ireland) Ulster
Try: Campagnaro (2) 20' m, 53' m Waldrom (2) 29' c, 50' c Penalty try 70' c Con: Steenson (3/5) 29', 50', 71'	Report	Try: Reidy 2' m Piutau (2) 33' c, 59' c Con: Jackson (2/3) 34', 60'

Sandy Park
Attendance: 10,671
Referee: Romain Poite (FFR)

21 January 2017
14:00

(1 BP) Clermont (France)	48–26	(England) Exeter Chiefs (1 BP)
Try: Kayser 2' c Nakaitaci 8' m Penalty try 28' c Fofana 32' c Abendanon 36' m Yato 43' c Lapandry 49' c Con: Parra (5/7) 3', 29', 33', 44', 50'; Pen: Parra (1/1) 23'	Report	Try: Short 41' c Devoto 60' c Woodburn 65' c Campagnaro 68' m Con: Steenson (2/2) 41', 61'; Simmonds (1/2) 66'

Stade Marcel-Michelin
Attendance: 17,201
Referee: Andrew Brace (IRFU)

21 January 2017
13:00

(1 BP) Ulster (Ireland)	22–26	(France) Bordeaux Bègles
Try: Trimble 18' m Van der Merwe 27' c Cave 58' c Con: Jackson (2/3) 29', 58'; Pen: Jackson (1/2) 40'	Report	Try: Lesgourgues 11' c Tauleigne 22' c Con: Madigan (2/2) 13', 23'; Pen: Madigan (2/2) 1', 31'; Hickey (2/2) 70', 74'

Kingspan Stadium
Attendance: 14,924
Referee: Matthew Carley (RFU)
