= 2017 European Rugby Champions Cup final =

2017 European Rugby Champions Cup Final
- Event: 2016–17 European Rugby Champions Cup
Clermont	Saracens
(France)	(England)
17	28
- Date: 13 May 2017
- Venue: Murrayfield Stadium, Edinburgh
- Man of the Match: Billy Vunipola (Saracens)
- Referee: Nigel Owens (Wales)
- Attendance: 55,272

The 2017 European Rugby Champions Cup Final was the final match in the 2016–17 European Rugby Champions Cup, and the twenty-second European club rugby final in general. It was contested by defending champions Saracens of England and French side Clermont at Murrayfield Stadium, in Edinburgh, Scotland, on Saturday 13 May 2017. Saracens retained the trophy after claiming a 28–17 victory.

== Background ==
Reigning champions Saracens entered the final aiming to defend their title, having won the Champions Cup for the first time in their history when they defeated Racing 92 by 21–9 in the 2016 final. The club was also looking to set a new record for most unbeaten European fixtures in a row, after matching the record of 17 held by Leinster. Meanwhile, Clermont were seeking their first top-tier European trophy, following two prior defeats in the 2013 and 2015 finals, both against Toulon.

For the second year running, Welsh referee Nigel Owens officiated the Champions Cup final – in doing so, he also became the first official to referee 100 European club rugby matches.

== Route to the final ==
Note: In all results below, the score of the finalist is given first (H: home; A: away).

(France) Clermont		Round	(England) Saracens	
Opponent	Result	Pool stage	Opponent	Result
(England) Exeter Chiefs	35–8 (A)	Matchday 1	(France) Toulon	31–23 (A)
(France) Bordeaux Bègles	49–33 (H)	Matchday 2	(Wales) Scarlets	44–26 (H)
(Ireland) Ulster	32–39 (A)	Matchday 3	(England) Sale Sharks	50–3 (H)
(Ireland) Ulster	38–19 (H)	Matchday 4	(England) Sale Sharks	24–10 (A)
(France) Bordeaux Bègles	9–6 (A)	Matchday 5	(Wales) Scarlets	22–22 (A)
(England) Exeter Chiefs	48–26 (H)	Matchday 6	(France) Toulon	10–3 (H)
Pool 5 winner: Team / P / Pts; (France) Clermont / 6 / 26; (France) Bordeaux Bègles / 6 / 14; (England) Exeter Chiefs / 6 / 12; (Ireland) Ulster / 6 / 10		Final standings	Pool 3 winner: Team / P / Pts; (England) Saracens / 6 / 24; (France) Toulon / 6 / 16; (Wales) Scarlets / 6 / 11; (England) Sale Sharks / 6 / 4	
Opponent	Result	Knock-out stage	Opponent	Result
(France) Toulon	29–9 (H)	Quarter-finals	(Scotland) Glasgow Warriors	38–13 (H)
(Ireland) Leinster	27–22 (H)	Semi-finals	(Ireland) Munster	26–10 (A)

== Match ==
=== Summary ===
After both teams enjoyed attacking spells in the opening 10 minutes without putting points on the board, Saracens opened the scoring when the ball was spread towards the right wing to Alex Goode, who placed a grubber kick behind the Clermont defenders which was collected by Chris Ashton. The try, which could not be converted, saw Ashton overtake Vincent Clerc as the top try scorer in European rugby history. Saracens extended their lead soon after when lock George Kruis powered over from close range for the team's second try, this time converted successfully by Owen Farrell. A short time later, Clermont responded when a break by Aurélien Rougerie set up centre Rémi Lamerat for their first try of the game, converted by scrum-half Morgan Parra. This left the half-time score at 12–7 to Saracens.

In the second half, the first ten minutes again went scoreless, until a Farrell penalty. Clermont then brought the game to within just one point via a team move, which started with full-back Scott Spedding counter-attacking from his own try line and ended with winger Nick Abendanon going over for the try, converted again by Parra. Following an exchange of penalties between Farrell and Parra, which kept the scoreline at a one-point advantage to Saracens, each team had try-scoring opportunities, but to no avail. Finally, in the closing stages, Saracens made their persistent pressure count when Goode crossed the line for a try in the corner, with Farrell landing a difficult conversion from out wide. With one last penalty, Saracens cemented their victory at 28–17, becoming only the fourth reigning champions in the tournament's 22-year history to successfully retain their title.

Saracens Number 8 Billy Vunipola was named the official Man of the Match, while fly-half Owen Farrell was presented with the 2017 ERCC Player of the Year Award. In securing victory, Saracens also achieved a record 18 consecutive unbeaten European games – a record stretching back to the first round of the 2015–2016 cup.

=== Details ===
13 May 2017
17:00

Clermont (France)	17–28	(England) Saracens
Try: Lamerat 26' c Abendanon 51' c Con: Parra (2/2) 27', 53'; Pen: Parra (1/1) 60'	Report	Try: Ashton 12' m Kruis 21' c Goode 72' c Con: Farrell (2/3) 22', 73'; Pen: Farrell (3/3) 50', 57', 78'

Murrayfield Stadium, Edinburgh
Attendance: 55,272
Referee: Nigel Owens (WRU)

Clermont	Saracens

FB	15	(France) Scott Spedding	(substituted off) 71'
RW	14	(England) David Strettle
OC	13	(France) Aurélien Rougerie	(substituted off) 54'
IC	12	(France) Rémi Lamerat
LW	11	(England) Nick Abendanon
FH	10	(France) Camille Lopez
SH	9	(France) Morgan Parra	(substituted off) 75'
N8	8	(New Zealand) Fritz Lee		(substituted off) 64'	(substituted in) 66'
OF	7	(Fiji) Peceli Yato	(substituted off) 61'	(substituted in) 64'	(substituted off) 66'
BF	6	(France) Damien Chouly (c)
RL	5	(France) Sébastien Vahaamahina	(substituted off) 46'
LL	4	(France) Arthur Iturria
TP	3	(Georgia (country)) Davit Zirakashvili	(substituted off) 77'
HK	2	(France) Benjamin Kayser	(substituted off) 67'
LP	1	(France) Raphaël Chaume	(substituted off) 23'	(substituted in) 26'	(substituted off) 54'
Substitutions:
HK	16	(Australia) John Ulugia	(substituted in) 67'
PR	17	(France) Étienne Falgoux	(substituted in) 23'	(substituted off) 26'	(substituted in) 54'
PR	18	(Wales) Aaron Jarvis	(substituted in) 77'
LK	19	(France) Paul Jedrasiak	(substituted in) 46'
FL	20	(France) Alexandre Lapandry	(substituted in) 61'
SH	21	(France) Ludovic Radosavljevic	(substituted in) 75'
FH	22	(Argentina) Patricio Fernández	(substituted in) 71'
WG	23	(France) Damian Penaud	(substituted in) 54'
Coach:
(France) Franck Azéma

FB	15	(England) Alex Goode
RW	14	(England) Chris Ashton
OC	13	(Argentina) Marcelo Bosch
IC	12	(England) Brad Barritt (c)	(substituted off) 54'
LW	11	(United States) Chris Wyles	(substituted off) 79'
FH	10	(England) Owen Farrell
SH	9	(England) Richard Wigglesworth	(substituted off) 79'
N8	8	(England) Billy Vunipola
OF	7	(England) Jackson Wray	(substituted off) 61'
BF	6	(South Africa) Michael Rhodes
RL	5	(England) George Kruis
LL	4	(England) Maro Itoje	(substituted off) 79'
TP	3	(South Africa) Vincent Koch	(substituted off) 79'
HK	2	(England) Jamie George	(substituted off) 51'
LP	1	(England) Mako Vunipola	(substituted off) 77'
Substitutions:
HK	16	(South Africa) Schalk Brits	(substituted in) 51'
PR	17	(United States) Titi Lamositele	(substituted in) 77'
PR	18	(South Africa) Petrus du Plessis	(substituted in) 79'
LK	19	(Scotland) Jim Hamilton	(substituted in) 79'
FL	20	(South Africa) Schalk Burger	(substituted in) 61'
SH	21	(England) Ben Spencer	(substituted in) 79'
FH	22	(England) Alex Lozowski	(substituted in) 79'
CE	23	(Scotland) Duncan Taylor	(substituted in) 54'
Coach:
(Ireland) Mark McCall

Man of the Match:
(England) Billy Vunipola (Saracens)

Assistant referees:
George Clancy (Ireland)
Ian Davies (Wales)
Television match official:
Jon Mason (Wales)
