= 2016–17 European Rugby Champions Cup =

Rugby union club competition

Tournament details
- Countries: England; France; Ireland; Italy; Scotland; Wales
- Tournament format(s): Round-robin and Knockout
- Date: 14 October 2016 – 13 May 2017

Tournament statistics
- Teams: 20
- Matches played: 67
- Attendance: 1,018,026 (15,194 per match)
- Highest attendance: 55,272 (The Final: Saracens v Clermont)
- Lowest attendance: 2,500 (Zebre v Wasps)
- Tries scored: 363 (5.42 per match)
- Top point scorer(s): Owen Farrell (Saracens) (126 points)
- Top try scorer(s): Isa Nacewa (Leinster) (7 tries)

Final
- Venue: Murrayfield, Edinburgh
- Champions: (England) Saracens (2nd title)
- Runners-up: (France) Clermont

The 2016–17 European Rugby Champions Cup was the third European Rugby Champions Cup championship (22nd overall), the annual rugby union club competition for teams from the top six nations in European rugby. The competition replaced the Heineken Cup, which was Europe's top-tier competition for rugby clubs for the first nineteen years of professional European rugby union. The opening round of the tournament took place on the weekend of 14/15/16 October 2016. The final took place on 13 May 2017 at Murrayfield in Edinburgh.

English side Saracens were the 2015–16 champions, having beaten Racing 92 of France in the 2016 final in Lyon.

Saracens retained the cup, defeating Clermont in the final 28–17.

== Teams ==
Twenty clubs from the three major European domestic and regional leagues competed in the Champions Cup. Nineteen of these qualified directly as a result of their league performance.

The distribution of teams was:

- England: 6 clubs
  - The top 6 clubs in the English Premiership. (6 clubs)
- France: 7 clubs
  - The top 6 clubs in the Top 14. (6 clubs)
  - There was a seventh club from France, after Montpellier won the 2015–16 European Rugby Challenge Cup. (1 club)
- Ireland, Italy, Scotland & Wales: 7 clubs, based on performance in the Pro12.
  - The best placed club from each nation. (4 clubs)
  - The 3 highest ranked clubs not qualified thereafter. (3 clubs)

Due to the 2015 Rugby World Cup, it was decided that the play-off system that had previously decided the final team would be suspended, and that this year the winner of the 2015–16 European Rugby Challenge Cup would automatically qualify for the tournament. In the event this team had already qualified, the team's domestic league would be allocated an extra qualifying place.

The following teams qualified for the 2016–17 tournament.

Aviva Premiership	Top 14	Pro 12			
England	France	Ireland	Italy	Scotland	Wales
Saracens; Exeter Chiefs; Wasps; Leicester Tigers; Northampton Saints; Sale Sharks	Racing 92; Toulon; Clermont; Montpellier; Toulouse; Castres; Bordeaux Bègles	Connacht; Leinster; Ulster; Munster	Zebre	Glasgow Warriors	Scarlets

This was the first time all four Irish provinces qualified for Europe's top club competition on their own merits, as Connacht's two previous appearances in the former Heineken Cup had been as a result of Leinster winning that cup the previous season.

=== Team details ===
Below is the list of coaches, captain and stadiums with their method of qualification for each team.

Note: Placing shown in brackets, denotes standing at the end of the regular season for their respective leagues, with their end of season positioning shown through CH for Champions, RU for Runner-up, SF for losing Semi-finalist and QF for losing Quarter-finalist.

Team	Coach / Director of Rugby	Captain	Stadium	Capacity	Method of Qualification
(France) Bordeaux Bègles	(France) Raphaël Ibañez	(New Zealand) Hugh Chalmers	Stade Chaban-Delmas	34,694	Top 14 top 7 (7th)
(France) Castres	(France) Christophe Urios	(Uruguay) Rodrigo Capo Ortega	Stade Pierre-Antoine	11,500	Top 14 top 7 (6th) (QF)
(France) Clermont	(France) Franck Azéma	(France) Damien Chouly	Stade Marcel-Michelin	19,022	Top 14 top 7 (1st) (SF)
(Ireland) Connacht	(Samoa) Pat Lam	(Ireland) John Muldoon	Galway Sportsgrounds	8,100	Pro12 top 7 (2nd) (CH)
(England) Exeter Chiefs	(England) Rob Baxter	(England) Jack Yeandle	Sandy Park	12,600	Aviva Premiership top 6 (2nd) (RU)
(Scotland) Glasgow Warriors	(Scotland) Gregor Townsend	(Scotland) Jonny Gray	Scotstoun Stadium	7,351	Pro 12 top Scottish team (3rd) (SF)
(England) Leicester Tigers	(New Zealand) Aaron Mauger (For (England) Richard Cockerill) (Note: Richard Cockerill began the tournament as Leicester Tigers head coach, but was replaced with Aaron Mauger on 2 January 2017 after Cockerill was sacked by the Tigers.)	(England) Tom Youngs	Welford Road	25,800	Aviva Premiership top 6 (4th) (SF)
(Ireland) Leinster	(Ireland) Leo Cullen	(Fiji) Isa Nacewa	RDS Arena; Aviva Stadium	18,500; 51,700	Pro 12 top Irish team (1st) (RU)
(France) Montpellier	(South Africa) Jake White	(France) Fulgence Ouedraogo	Altrad Stadium	14,700	Challenge Cup winner, Top 14 top 7 (3rd) (SF)
(Ireland) Munster	(South Africa) Rassie Erasmus	(Ireland) Peter O'Mahony	Thomond Park	25,600	Pro12 top 7 (6th)
(England) Northampton Saints	(England) Jim Mallinder	(England) Tom Wood	Franklin's Gardens	15,500	Aviva Premiership top 6 (5th)
(France) Racing 92	(France) Laurent Labit (France) Laurent Travers	(France) Dimitri Szarzewski	Stade Yves-du-Manoir	14,400	Top 14 top 7 (4th) (CH)
(England) Sale Sharks	(England) Steve Diamond	(England) Josh Beaumont	AJ Bell Stadium	12,000	Aviva Premiership top 6 (6th)
(England) Saracens	(Ireland) Mark McCall	(England) Brad Barritt	Allianz Park	10,000	Aviva Premiership top 6 (1st) (CH)
(Wales) Scarlets	(New Zealand) Wayne Pivac	(Wales) Ken Owens	Parc y Scarlets	14,870	Pro 12 top Welsh team (5th)
(France) Toulon	(England) Mike Ford (For (Italy) Diego Domínguez) (Note: Diego Domínguez began the tournament as Toulon's head coach, but was replaced with Mike Ford on 24 October 2016.)	(South Africa) Juan Smith	Stade Mayol	15,820	Top 14 top 7 (2nd) (RU)
(France) Toulouse	(France) Ugo Mola	(France) Thierry Dusautoir	Stade Ernest-Wallon	19,500	Top 14 top 7 (5th) (QF)
(Ireland) Ulster	(Australia) Les Kiss	(Ireland) Andrew Trimble	Kingspan Stadium	18,196	Pro12 top 7 (4th) (SF)
(England) Wasps	(Wales) Dai Young	(England) Joe Launchbury	Ricoh Arena	32,609	Aviva Premiership top 6 (3rd) (SF)
(Italy) Zebre	(Argentina) Víctor Jiménez (For (Italy) Gianluca Guidi) (Note: Gianluca Guidi began the tournament as Zebre head coach, but on mutual agreement with the club and himself, left his post as head coach on 17 January 2017. He was replaced with Víctor Jiménez.)	(Italy) George Biagi	Stadio Sergio Lanfranchi	5,000	Pro 12 top Italian team (11th)

== Seeding ==
The 20 competing teams are seeded and split into four tiers, each containing 5 teams.

For the purpose of creating the tiers, clubs are ranked based on their domestic league performances and on their qualification for the knockout phases of their championships, so a losing quarter-finalist in the Top 14 would be seeded below a losing semi-finalist, even if they finished above them in the regular season.

Rank	Top 14	Premiership	Pro 12
1	(France) Racing 92	(England) Saracens	(Ireland) Connacht
2	(France) Toulon	(England) Exeter Chiefs	(Ireland) Leinster
3	(France) Clermont	(England) Wasps	(Scotland) Glasgow Warriors
4	(France) Montpellier	(England) Leicester Tigers	(Ireland) Ulster
5	(France) Toulouse	(England) Northampton Saints	(Wales) Scarlets
6	(France) Castres	(England) Sale Sharks	(Ireland) Munster
7	(France) Bordeaux Bègles		(Italy) Zebre

Based on these seedings, teams are placed into one of the four tiers, with the top seed clubs being put in Tier 1. The nature of the tier system means that a draw is needed to allocate two of the three second seed clubs to Tier 1. Exeter Chiefs and Leinster were drawn into Tier 1, meaning the remaining side - Toulon went into Tier 2. As a result of this draw, Montpellier also entered Tier 2, as the fourth seed from the league of the second seed placed in Tier 2. The other two fourth-ranked sides fell into Tier 3.

The tiers are shown below. Brackets show each team's seeding and their league (for example, 1 Top 14 indicates the team was seeded 1st from the Top 14).

Tier 1	(England) Saracens (1 AP)	(Ireland) Connacht (1 Pro12)	(France) Racing 92 (1 Top 14)	(England) Exeter Chiefs (2 AP)	(Ireland) Leinster (2 Pro12)
Tier 2	(France) Toulon (2 Top 14)	(England) Wasps (3 AP)	(Scotland) Glasgow Warriors (3 Pro12)	(France) Clermont (3 Top 14)	(France) Montpellier (4 Top 14)
Tier 3	(England) Leicester Tigers (4 AP)	(Ireland) Ulster (4 Pro12)	(England) Northampton Saints (5 AP)	(Wales) Scarlets (5 Pro12)	(France) Toulouse (5 Top 14)
Tier 4	(England) Sale Sharks (6 AP)	(Ireland) Munster (6 Pro12)	(France) Castres (6 Top 14)	(Italy) Zebre (7 Pro12)	(France) Bordeaux Bègles (7 Top 14)

The following restrictions will apply to the draw:

- Each pool will consist of four clubs, one from each Tier in the draw.
- Each pool must have one from each league drawn from Tier 1,2 or 3. No pool will have a second team from the same league until the allocation of Tier 4 takes place.
- Where two PRO12 clubs compete in the same pool, they must be from different countries.

== Pool stage ==
The draw took place on 29 June 2016, in Neuchâtel, Switzerland.

Teams will play each other twice, both at home and away, in the group stage, that will begin on weekend of 14/15/16 October 2016, and continue through to 20/21/22 January 2017, before the pool winners and three best runners-up progressed to the quarter-finals.

Teams will be awarded competition points, based on match result. Teams receive 4 points for a win, 2 points for a draw, 1 attacking bonus point for scoring four or more tries in a match and 1 defensive bonus point for losing a match by seven points or fewer.

In the event of a tie between two or more teams, the following tie-breakers will be used, as directed by EPCR:

1. Where teams have played each other
  1. The club with the greater number of competition points from only matches involving tied teams.
  2. If equal, the club with the best aggregate points difference from those matches.
  3. If equal, the club that scored the most tries in those matches.
2. Where teams remain tied and/or have not played each other in the competition (i.e. are from different pools)
  1. The club with the best aggregate points difference from the pool stage.
  2. If equal, the club that scored the most tries in the pool stage.
  3. If equal, the club with the fewest players suspended in the pool stage.
  4. If equal, the drawing of lots will determine a club's ranking.

Key to colours
Winner of each pool, advance to quarter-finals.
Three highest-scoring second-place teams advance to quarter-finals.

=== Pool 1 ===
Team	P	W	D	L	PF	PA	Diff	TF	TA	TB	LB	Pts
(Ireland) Munster (2)	6	5	0	1	160	64	+96	18	4	3	1	24
(Scotland) Glasgow Warriors (6)	6	4	0	2	160	86	+74	18	10	2	1	19
(England) Leicester Tigers	6	2	0	4	61	190	–129	3	23	0	0	8
(France) Racing 92	6	1	0	5	89	130	–41	12	14	1	0	5

=== Pool 2 ===
Team	P	W	D	L	PF	PA	Diff	TF	TA	TB	LB	Pts
(England) Wasps (5)	6	4	1	1	210	112	+98	28	13	3	1	22
(France) Toulouse (7)	6	3	1	2	164	91	+73	22	10	2	2	18
(Ireland) Connacht	6	4	0	2	188	118	+70	26	15	2	0	18
(Italy) Zebre	6	0	0	6	90	331	−241	11	49	0	0	0

=== Pool 3 ===
Team	P	W	D	L	PF	PA	Diff	TF	TA	TB	LB	Pts
(England) Saracens (3)	6	5	1	0	181	87	+94	20	6	2	0	24
(France) Toulon (8)	6	3	0	3	120	100	+20	12	10	2	2	16
(Wales) Scarlets	6	2	1	3	141	154	–13	11	15	0	1	11
(England) Sale Sharks	6	1	0	5	66	167	–101	7	19	0	0	4

=== Pool 4 ===
Team	P	W	D	L	PF	PA	Diff	TF	TA	TB	LB	Pts
(Ireland) Leinster (4)	6	4	1	1	227	87	+140	31	10	4	1	23
(France) Montpellier	6	3	0	3	120	149	–29	15	15	2	2	16
(France) Castres	6	2	1	3	144	147	–3	15	20	1	1	12
(England) Northampton Saints	6	2	0	4	91	199	−108	10	26	1	0	9

=== Pool 5 ===
Team	P	W	D	L	PF	PA	Diff	TF	TA	TB	LB	Pts
(France) Clermont (1)	6	5	0	1	211	131	+80	26	18	5	1	26
(France) Bordeaux Bègles	6	3	0	3	118	120	–2	11	13	1	1	14
(England) Exeter Chiefs	6	2	0	4	110	146	–36	13	16	2	2	12
(Ireland) Ulster	6	2	0	4	131	173	–42	16	19	1	1	10

=== Ranking of pool leaders and runners-up ===
Rank	Pool Leaders	Pts	Diff	TF
1	(France) Clermont	26	+80	26
2	(Ireland) Munster	24	+96	18
3	(England) Saracens	24	+94	20
4	(Ireland) Leinster	23	+140	31
5	(England) Wasps	22	+98	28
Rank	Pool Runners–up	Pts	Diff	TF
6	(Scotland) Glasgow Warriors	19	+74	18
7	(France) Toulouse	18	+73	20
8	(France) Toulon	16	+20	12
9	(France) Montpellier	16	–29	15
10	(France) Bordeaux Bègles	14	–2	11

== Knock-out stage ==
=== Format ===
The eight qualifiers are ranked according to their performance in the pool stage and compete in the quarter-finals which were held on the weekend of 31 March, 1/2 April 2017. The four top teams hosted the quarter-finals against the four lower teams in a 1v8, 2v7, 3v6 and 4v5 format.

The semi-finals were played on the weekend of 22/23 April 2017. In lieu of the draw that was used to determine the semi-final pairing, EPCR announced that a fixed semi-final bracket would be set in advance, and that the home team would be designated based on "performances by clubs during the pool stages as well as the achievement of a winning a quarter-final match away from home". Semi-final matches must be played at a neutral ground in the designated home team's country.

Home country advantage was awarded as follows:

Winner of QF		Semi-final 1 (Home v Away)
1	4	1 v 4
1	5	5 v 1
8	4	8 v 4
8	5	5 v 8

Winner of QF		Semi-final 2 (Home v Away)
3	2	2 v 3
3	7	7 v 3
6	2	6 v 2
6	7	6 v 7

The winners of the semi-finals contested the final, at Murrayfield, on 13 May 2017.

=== Bracket ===
Quarter-finals
3	(England) Saracens	38
6	(Scotland) Glasgow Warriors	13
2	(Ireland) Munster	41
7	(France) Toulouse	16
1	(France) Clermont	29
8	(France) Toulon	9
4	(Ireland) Leinster	32
5	(England) Wasps	17

Semi-finals
(England) Saracens	26
(Ireland) Munster	10
(France) Clermont	27
(Ireland) Leinster	22

Final
(England) Saracens	28
(France) Clermont	17

=== Quarter-finals ===
1 April 2017
15:15

Leinster (Ireland) (4)	32–17	(5) (England) Wasps
Try: Nacewa 14' m Conan 33' c Henshaw 40' c McFadden 73' c Con: Sexton (3/4) 34', 40', 75'; Pen: Sexton (2/2) 6', 48'	Report	Try: Wade 52' c Gopperth 59' c Con: Gopperth (2/2) 53', 61'; Pen: Gopperth (1/1) 31'

Aviva Stadium
Attendance: 50,266
Referee: Nigel Owens (WRU)

1 April 2017
17:45

Munster (Ireland) (2)	41–16	(7) (France) Toulouse
Try: J. Ryan 4' c Stander 47' m Sweetnam 75' c Conway 79' c Con: Bleyendaal (3/4) 4', 77', 80'; Pen: Bleyendaal (5/5) 9', 26', 42', 52', 74'	Report	Try: Perez 54' c Con: Doussain (1/1) 55'; Pen: Doussain (3/3) 19', 31', 40'

Thomond Park
Attendance: 26,200
Referee: JP Doyle (RFU)

2 April 2017
13:00

Saracens (England) (3)	38–13	(6) (Scotland) Glasgow Warriors
Try: Ashton (2) 31' m, 78' c Bosch 59' c Barritt 73' c Con: Farrell (3/4) 59', 73', 78'; Pen: Farrell (4/4) 9', 15', 27', 70'	Report	Try: Jones 48' m Wilson 80' m Pen: Russell (1/1) 11'

Allianz Park
Attendance: 15,000 (Note: Due to European Rugby rules regarding minimum capacity for knockout matches, Saracens home ground Allianz Park was expanded from 10,000 to 15,000 using temporary seating to enable them to host their quarter final fixture.)
Referee: Jérôme Garcès (FFR)

2 April 2017
16:15

Clermont (France) (1)	29–9	(8) (France) Toulon
Try: Nakaitaci 61' c Penaud 80' c Con: Parra (2/2) 61', 80'; Pen: Parra (4/4) 5', 29', 45', 78'; Drop: Lopez (1/1) 71'	Report	Pen: Halfpenny (3/3) 21', 34', 58'

Stade Marcel-Michelin
Attendance: 18,873
Referee: Wayne Barnes (RFU)

=== Semi-finals ===
22 April 2017
15:15

Munster (Ireland)	10–26	(England) Saracens
Try: Stander 80' c Con: Keatley (1/1) 80'; Pen: Bleyendaal (1/2) 7'	Report	Try: M. Vunipola 54' c Wyles 70' c Con: Farrell (2/2) 55', 72'; Pen: Farrell (4/4) 17', 35', 64', 75'

Aviva Stadium
Attendance: 51,300
Referee: Romain Poite (FFR)

23 April 2017
16:00

Clermont (France)	27–22	(Ireland) Leinster
Try: Yato 4' c Strettle 15' m Con: Parra (1/2) 6'; Pen: Parra (2/3) 10', 57'; Lopez (1/1) 72'; Drop: Lopez (2/2) 64', 76'	Report	Try: Ringrose 68' c Con: Sexton (1/1) 69'; Pen: Sexton (5/5) 41'+3, 44', 49', 54', 79'

Matmut Stadium de Gerland
Attendance: 40,024
Referee: Nigel Owens (WRU)

=== Final ===
13 May 2017
17:00

Saracens (England)	28–17	(France) Clermont
Try: Ashton 12' m Kruis 21' c Goode 72' c Con: Farrell (2/3) 22', 73'; Pen: Farrell (3/3) 50', 57', 78'	Report	Try: Lamerat 26' c Abendanon 51' c Con: Parra (2/2) 27', 53'; Pen: Parra (1/1) 60'

Murrayfield, Edinburgh
Attendance: 55,272
Referee: Nigel Owens (WRU)

== Attendances ==
- Does not include final as they are played at a neutral venue.

Club	Home Games	Total	Average	Highest	Lowest	% Capacity
(France) Bordeaux Bègles	3	63,399	21,133	21,196	21,071	61%
(France) Castres	3	23,745	7,915	8,405	7,040	69%
(France) Clermont (Note: Figures include semi-final 'home game' played at the Matmut Stadium de Gerland in Lyon.)	5	112,802	22,560	40,024	17,201	95%
(Ireland) Connacht	3	21,788	7,263	8,091	5,607	90%
(England) Exeter Chiefs	3	29,693	9,898	10,671	9,143	79%
(Scotland) Glasgow Warriors	3	22,053	7,351	7,351	7,351	100%
(England) Leicester Tigers	3	62,606	20,869	24,213	19,048	81%
(Ireland) Leinster	4	120,325	30,081	50,266	13,890	85%
(France) Montpellier	3	26,839	8,946	11,260	10,679	61%
(Ireland) Munster (Note: Figures include semi-final 'home game' played at the Aviva Stadium in Dublin.)	5	154,900	30,980	51,300	25,600	100%
(England) Northampton Saints	3	42,895	14,298	15,151	13,645	92%
(France) Racing 92	3	23,554	7,851	9,233	5,449	56%
(England) Sale Sharks	3	19,835	6,612	9,402	4,275	55%
(England) Saracens	4	42,830	10,708	15,000	8,746	95%
(Wales) Scarlets	3	22,591	7,530	8,579	6,521	51%
(France) Toulon	3	38,396	12,799	14,103	11,978	81%
(France) Toulouse	3	36,607	12,202	14,206	10,378	47%
(Ireland) Ulster	3	48,083	16,028	16,843	14,924	88%
(England) Wasps	3	41,313	13,771	17,248	10,701	42%
(Italy) Zebre	3	8,500	2,833	3,000	2,500	57%

== See also ==
- 2016–17 European Rugby Challenge Cup
