= Andrew Brace =

Rugby union referee and former player

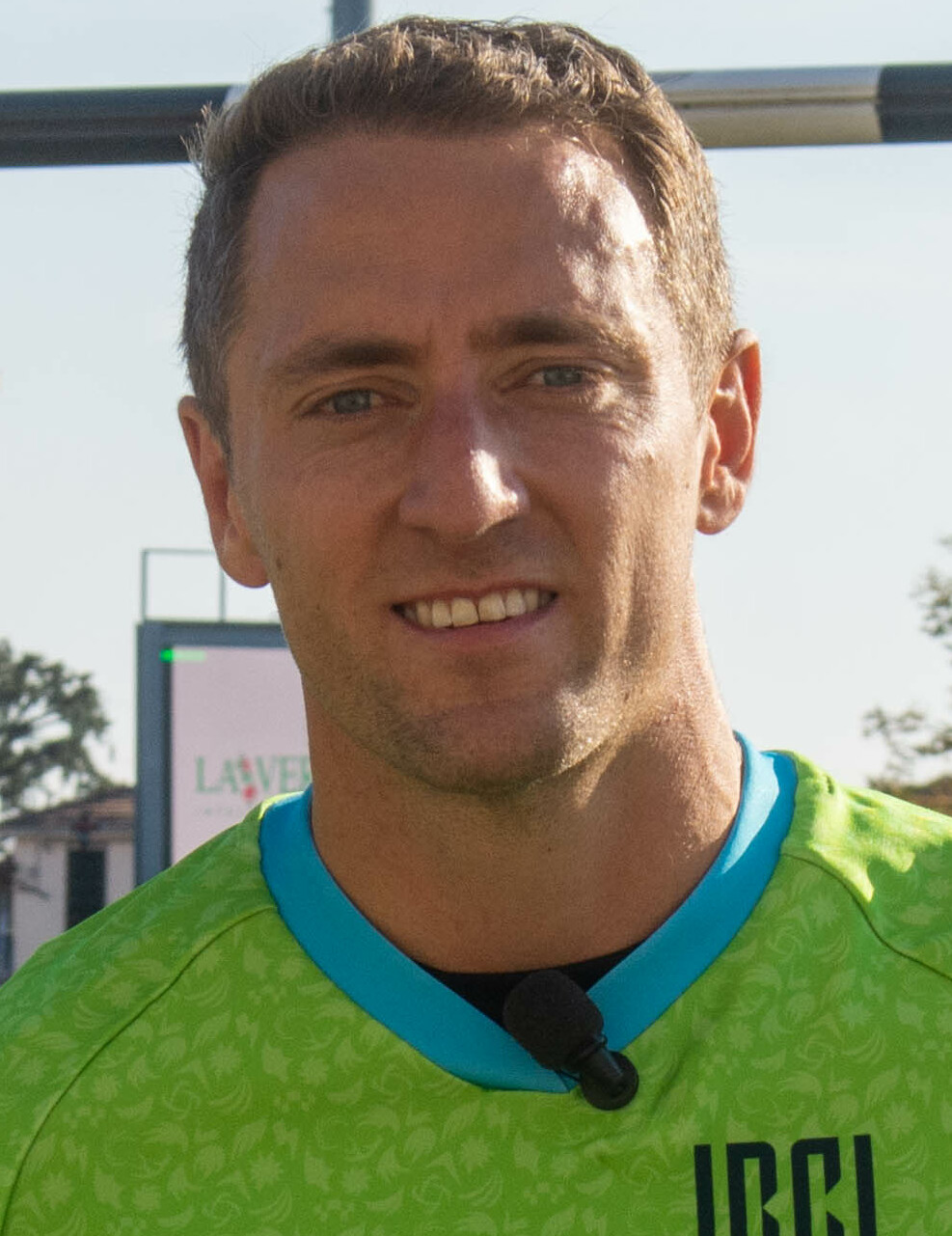
- Brace in 2021
- Born: Andrew Mark Brace; 15 June 1988 (age 38) Cardiff, Wales

Rugby union career
International career
Years	Team	Apps	(Points)
–	Belgium		
National sevens team
Years	Team		Comps
- Belgium sevens.

Andrew Mark Brace (born 15 June 1988) is a rugby union referee and former player. Born in Cardiff, Wales, Brace represents the Irish Rugby Football Union as a referee, and was an international player for Belgium. He currently referees in the URC, European Rugby Challenge Cup, European Rugby Champions Cup and at test match level.

== Early life ==
Brace was born in Cardiff, Wales. He moved between Ireland and Wales throughout his early life. He started playing rugby union in Cardiff when he was 12. In his youth Brace also played the violin. He is a grade eight violinist. His violin teacher was the mother of Gethin Jones. Between 2006 and 2009 Brace attended the University of St Mark & St John where he gained a BA in sports science and coaching. Between 2010 and 2017 Brace worked as a community rugby officer for Munster Rugby. He previously worked as a community development officer for Cardiff Blues. Brace continued working as a community rugby officer until 2017 when, together with George Clancy, John Lacey and Joy Neville he was one of seven referees offered professional contracts by the IRFU.

== Playing career ==
=== Clubs ===
While working as a community rugby officer for Munster Rugby, Brace also played for Old Crescent.^{[Note 1]}

=== Belgium ===
While playing for Old Crescent, Brace was contacted by an agent to play for the Belgium national team. Brace qualified to represent Belgium through his father's family. He subsequently helped Belgium win the 2012 Emirates Cup of Nations. He also played for Belgium in the 2012–14 European Nations Cup First Division. His international career ended after he suffered a run of injuries. Brace also played for the Belgium sevens team.

== Refereeing career ==
While still working as a community rugby officer for Munster Rugby, Brace attended a schools tournament and was asked to referee a match because they were short of an official. He was encouraged to take up refereeing by John Lacey. Brace subsequently took charge of matches in both the British and Irish Cup and All-Ireland League. On 3 April 2015 he refereed the 2014–15 British and Irish Cup final between Worcester Warriors and Doncaster Knights. On 7 May 2016 he refereed the 2015–16 All-Ireland League final between Clontarf and Cork Constitution. On 6 September 2015 Brace made his Pro14 debut when he took charge of a 2015–16 match between Cardiff Blues and Zebre.

On 14 November 2015 Brace made his European Rugby Challenge Cup debut, taking charge of a 2015–16 pool stage match between Gloucester and Zebre. On 15 October 2016 Brace made his European Rugby Champions Cup debut, taking charge of a 2016–17 pool stage match between Wasps and Zebre. On 22 April 2017 Brace took charge of the 2016–17 European Rugby Challenge Cup semi-final between La Rochelle and Gloucester.

In 2020, he took charge of his first major final, officiating the 2020 Pro14 Grand Final, which he later repeated in 2022. He has also refereed a EPCR Challenge Cup final, when he took charge of the 2021 final.

=== International ===
Brace refereed matches in the 2016 Six Nations Under 20s Championship and at the 2016 World Rugby Under 20 Championship, including the third place game between Argentina and South Africa.

In 2017 Brace began refereeing test matches. On 28 May 2017 Brace took charge of a match between England and the Barbarians and on 10 June 2017 he took charge of a match between Canada and Georgia. In November 2017 Brace took charge of his first competitive test match between England and Samoa, a 2019 Rugby World Cup qualifier between Canada and the United States. In addition to taking charge of test matches, Brace has also served as a referee in both the Six Nations Championship and the Rugby Championship, and was appointed to the 2019 Rugby World Cup as an assistant referee and referee of the 2023 Rugby World Cup.

== Honours ==
Belgium

- Emirates Cup of Nations
  - Winners: 2012

Individual

- Munster Rugby Referee of the Year 2014
- URC Final Referee 2020, 2022
- European Challenge Cup Final Referee 2020,2021
- Autumn Nations Cup Final Referee 2020
- RWC 2019, 2023

== Notes ==
- ^1 An Andy Brace played rugby league for Treaty City Titans, Munster and Ireland A in the 2012 Skanska Amateur Four Nations. This is possibly the same player.
