= 2015–16 Top 14 season =

French rugby union club competition

2015–16 Top 14
- Countries: France
- Date: 22 August 2015 – 24 June 2016
- Champions: Racing 92 (6th title)
- Runners-up: Toulon
- Relegated: Oyonnax, Agen
- Matches played: 187
- Attendance: 2,678,562 (average 14,324 per match)
- Highest attendance: 99,124 (play-offs); Toulon v Racing 92; 24 June 2016; 57,886 (league stage); Toulon v Clermont; 3 April 2016
- Lowest attendance: 5,983; Racing 92 v Grenoble; 12 September 2015
- Tries scored: 840 (average 4.5 per match)
- Top point scorer: (France) Gaëtan Germain (Brive); 319 points
- Top try scorer: (Fiji) Timoci Nagusa (Montpellier); 16 tries

Official website
- www.lnr.fr

The 2015–16 Top 14 competition was a French domestic rugby union club competition operated by the Ligue Nationale de Rugby (LNR). Two new teams from the 2014–15 Pro D2 season were promoted to Top 14 this year, Agen and Pau in place of the two relegated teams, Bayonne and Lyon. Home-and-away play began on 22 August 2015 and ended on 23 May 2016. This was followed by a playoff stage involving the top six teams, culminating in the final on 24 June 2016 at the Camp Nou in Barcelona, Spain. The final was moved from its traditional site of the Stade de France in Saint-Denis because of a scheduling conflict with UEFA Euro 2016.

Having defeated Toulouse and table-topping Clermont en route to the final, Racing 92 won their sixth French championship title, and first since 1990, with a 29–21 win over Toulon, despite playing over three-quarters of the game with 14 men after scrum-half Maxime Machenaud was sent off for a dangerous tackle on Matt Giteau.

== Teams ==
Locations of the 2015–16 Top 14 teams

| Club | City (department) | Stadium | Capacity |
|---|---|---|---|
| Agen | Agen (Lot-et-Garonne) | Stade Armandie | 14,000 |
| Bordeaux Bègles | Bordeaux (Gironde) | Stade Chaban-Delmas (Bordeaux); Matmut Atlantique | 34,700; 41,458 |
| Brive | Brive-la-Gaillarde (Corrèze) | Stade Amédée-Domenech | 16,000 |
| Castres | Castres (Tarn) | Stade Pierre-Antoine | 11,500 |
| Clermont | Clermont-Ferrand (Puy-de-Dôme) | Stade Marcel-Michelin | 19,022 (Note: Clermont's ground capacity is up to 19,022 from 18,030 the previous season.) |
| Grenoble | Grenoble (Isère) | Stade des Alpes (Note: Grenoble's traditional home is Stade Lesdiguières; however, beginning in 2012–13, they moved high-demand home matches to the larger Stade des Alpes. Starting in 2014–15, they became the primary tenants of Stade des Alpes.) | 20,068 |
| La Rochelle | La Rochelle (Charente-Maritime) | Stade Marcel-Deflandre | 15,000 |
| Montpellier | Montpellier (Hérault) | Altrad Stadium | 14,700 (Note: Montpellier's stadium capacity is currently 15,697 which was in effect from the 2016-17 season. However, Montpellier did achieve a crowd of 15,000 in their game against Toulon on 29 May 2016 so the capacity change could have occurred some time during the 2015-16 season.) |
| Oyonnax | Oyonnax (Ain) | Stade Charles-Mathon | 12,400 (Note: Although Oyonnax's home ground of Stade-Charles capacity is listed as 11,400, it was increased for the 2015-16 season by at least 1,000 due to the creation of the north-stand (which was removed the following season). The club also achieved a crowd of 14,000 during their game against Clermont on 5 September 2015, which suggests capacity may have been even more, although this may be due to temporary space being created for what was in effect, a derby game.) |
| Pau | Pau (Pyrénées-Atlantiques) | Stade du Hameau | 13,800 |
| Racing 92 | Colombes (Hauts-de-Seine) | Stade Olympique Yves-du-Manoir (Note: In recent years, Racing has taken occasional home matches to Stade de France, MMArena in Le Mans, and Stade Océane in Le Havre.) | 14,000 |
| Stade Français | Paris, 16th arrondissement | Stade Jean-Bouin (Note: Stade Français also played one home game at the 25,000 capacity MMArena in Le Mans.) | 20,000 |
| Toulon | Toulon (Var) | Stade Mayol (Note: In recent years, Toulon has taken occasional home matches to Stade Vélodrome in Marseille and Allianz Riviera in Nice.) | 15,400 |
| Toulouse | Toulouse (Haute-Garonne) | Stade Ernest-Wallon; Stadium Municipal (Note: Toulouse often takes high-demand home matches to the city's largest sporting venue, Stadium Municipal. The 2015–16 season was the first since 2013 in which the stadium was available, following renovations for UEFA Euro 2016.) | 19,500; 33,150 |

== Competition format ==
The top six teams at the end of the regular season (after all the teams played one another twice, once at home, once away) enter a knockout stage to decide the Champions of France. This consists of three rounds: the teams finishing third to sixth in the table play quarter-finals (hosted by the third and fourth placed teams). The winners then face the top two teams in the semi-finals, with the winners meeting in the final, held this season at Camp Nou because the traditional site of Stade de France was not available in 2015–16 due to conflict with UEFA Euro 2016.

The LNR uses a slightly different bonus points system from that used in most other rugby competitions. It trialled a new system in 2007–08 explicitly designed to prevent a losing team from earning more than one bonus point in a match, a system that also made it impossible for either team to earn a bonus point in a drawn match. LNR chose to continue with this system for subsequent seasons.

France's bonus point system operates as follows:

- 4 points for a win.
- 2 points for a draw.
- 1 bonus point for winning while scoring at least 3 more tries than the opponent. This replaces the standard bonus point for scoring 4 tries regardless of the match result.
- 1 bonus point for losing by 5 points (or fewer). The margin had been 7 points until being changed prior to the 2014–15 season.

== Table ==
2015–16 Top 14 table
| Pos | Team | Pld | W | D | L | PF | PA | PD | TF | TA | TB | LB | Pts | Qualification or relegation |
|---|---|---|---|---|---|---|---|---|---|---|---|---|---|---|
| 1 | Clermont (SF) | 26 | 18 | 1 | 7 | 735 | 431 | +304 | 77 | 33 | 10 | 4 | 88 | Semi-final play-off place Berth in the 2016–17 European Rugby Champions Cup |
| 2 | Toulon (RU) | 26 | 16 | 0 | 10 | 764 | 446 | +318 | 90 | 37 | 11 | 7 | 82 | Semi-final play-off place Berth in the 2016–17 European Rugby Champions Cup |
| 3 | Montpellier (SF) | 26 | 18 | 0 | 8 | 723 | 569 | +154 | 77 | 50 | 7 | 2 | 81 | Quarter-final play-off place Berths in the Champions Cup |
| 4 | Racing (CH) | 26 | 18 | 1 | 7 | 614 | 522 | +92 | 63 | 46 | 5 | 2 | 81 | Quarter-final play-off place Berths in the Champions Cup |
| 5 | Toulouse (QF) | 26 | 16 | 2 | 8 | 680 | 393 | +287 | 80 | 35 | 7 | 4 | 79 | Quarter-final play-off place Berths in the Champions Cup |
| 6 | Castres (QF) | 26 | 15 | 0 | 11 | 650 | 496 | +154 | 68 | 36 | 6 | 5 | 71 | Quarter-final play-off place Berths in the Champions Cup |
| 7 | Bordeaux (CC) (Note: As 2015–16 European Rugby Challenge Cup winners Montpellier have qualified via their league position) | 26 | 14 | 2 | 10 | 552 | 503 | +49 | 44 | 44 | 3 | 4 | 67 | Berth in the 2016–17 European Rugby Champions Cup |
| 8 | Brive | 26 | 13 | 1 | 12 | 540 | 545 | −5 | 43 | 51 | 4 | 4 | 62 | |
| 9 | La Rochelle | 26 | 11 | 0 | 15 | 553 | 656 | −103 | 51 | 65 | 4 | 6 | 54 | |
| 10 | Grenoble | 26 | 10 | 0 | 16 | 605 | 779 | −174 | 60 | 91 | 4 | 3 | 47 | |
| 11 | Pau | 26 | 10 | 1 | 15 | 420 | 675 | −255 | 30 | 75 | 2 | 2 | 46 | |
| 12 | Stade Français | 26 | 9 | 0 | 17 | 543 | 631 | −88 | 50 | 62 | 2 | 3 | 41 | |
| 13 | Agen (R) | 26 | 5 | 0 | 21 | 531 | 846 | −315 | 50 | 94 | 1 | 5 | 26 | Relegated to Rugby Pro D2 |
| 14 | Oyonnax (R) | 26 | 5 | 0 | 21 | 429 | 847 | −418 | 41 | 96 | 2 | 2 | 24 | Relegated to Rugby Pro D2 |

Rules for classification: If teams are level at any stage, tiebreakers are applied in the following order:
1. Competition points earned in head-to-head matches
2. Points difference in head-to-head matches
3. Try differential in head-to-head matches
4. Points difference in all matches
5. Try differential in all matches
6. Points scored in all matches
7. Tries scored in all matches
8. Fewer matches forfeited
9. Classification in the previous Top 14 season
  Notes:

== Relegation ==
Normally, the teams that finish in 13th and 14th places in the table are relegated to Pro D2 at the end of the season. In certain circumstances, "financial reasons" may cause a higher placed team to be demoted instead. This last happened at the end of the 2009–10 season when 12th place Montauban were relegated thereby reprieving 13th place Bayonne.

== Fixtures & Results ==
The outline fixtures schedule was announced in May 2015.

=== Round 1 ===
21 August 2015
20:45

| (1 BP) Toulon | 22–27 | Racing |
| | Report |

Stade Mayol
Attendance: 14,612
Referee: Pascal Gaüzère

22 August 2015
14:45

| La Rochelle | 6–44 | Clermont (1 BP) |
| | Report |

Stade Marcel-Deflandre
Attendance: 15,000
Referee: Alexandre Ruiz

22 August 2015
18:30

| Bordeaux Bègles | 19–16 | Castres (1 BP) |
| | Report |

Stade Chaban-Delmas
Attendance: 19,712
Referee: Romain Poite

22 August 2015
18:30

| Toulouse | 24–7 | Brive |
| | Report |

Stade Ernest-Wallon
Attendance: 14,003
Referee: Thomas Charabas

22 August 2015
18:30

| (1 BP) Montpellier | 35–19 | Oyonnax |
| | Report |

Altrad Stadium
Attendance: 9,850
Referee: Laurent Cardona

22 August 2015
18:30

| (1 BP) Grenoble | 38–23 | Agen |
| | Report |

Stade des Alpes
Attendance: 12,000
Referee: Cédric Marchat

23 August 2015
16:15

| Stade Français | 34–18 | Pau |
| | Report |

Stade Jean-Bouin
Attendance: 10,000
Referee: Salem Attalah

=== Round 2 ===
28 August 2015
21:00

| (1 BP) Clermont | 25–6 | Grenoble |
| | Report |

Stade Marcel-Michelin
Attendance: 15,987
Referee: Adrien Descottes

29 August 2015
14:45

| Agen | 9–20 | Toulouse |
| | Report |

Stade Armandie
Attendance: 11,613
Referee: Pascal Gaüzère

29 August 2015
18:30

| (1 BP) Oyonnax | 37–19 | Bordeaux Bègles |
| | Report |

Stade Charles-Mathon
Attendance: 11,000
Referee: Maxime Chalon

29 August 2015
18:30

| Racing | 20–19 | La Rochelle (1 BP) |
| | Report |

Stade Olympique Yves-du-Manoir
Attendance: 6,192
Referee: Tual Trainini

29 August 2015
18:30

| Pau | 26–16 | Montpellier |
| | Report |

Stade du Hameau
Attendance: 12,500
Referee: Cyril Lafon

29 August 2015
20:45

| Brive | 22–13 | Stade Français |
| | Report |

Stade Amédée-Domenech
Attendance: 11,224
Referee: Cédric Marchat

30 August 2015
17:00

| (1 BP) Castres | 24–9 | Toulon |
| | Report |

Stade Pierre-Antoine
Attendance: 10,475
Referee: Alexandre Ruiz

=== Round 3 ===
5 September 2015
14:35

| Oyonnax | 24–41 | Clermont (1 BP) |
| | Report |

Stade Charles-Mathon
Attendance: 14,000
Referee: Cédric Marchat

5 September 2015
16:00

| (1 BP) Grenoble | 41–15 | Pau |
| | Report |

Stade des Alpes
Attendance: 11,000
Referee: Maxime Chalon

5 September 2015
16:00

| La Rochelle | 21–18 | Brive (1 BP) |
| | Report |

Stade Marcel-Deflandre
Attendance: 14,867
Referee: Salem Attalah

5 September 2015
16:00

| Agen | 30–18 | Racing |
| | Report |

Stade Armandie
Attendance: 7,292
Referee: Adrien Descottes

5 September 2015
16:35

| Toulouse | 37–20 | Castres |
| | Report |

Stade Ernest-Wallon
Attendance: 16,000
Referee: Laurent Cardona

6 September 2015
16:15

| (1 BP) Bordeaux Bègles | 22–24 | Montpellier |
| | Report |

Stade Chaban-Delmas
Attendance: 20,131
Referee: Tual Trainini

6 September 2015
21:00

| Stade Français | 13–20 | Toulon |
| | Report |

Stade Jean-Bouin
Attendance: 13,866
Referee: Thomas Charabas

=== Round 4 ===
11 September 2015
20:45

| Castres | 35–26 | Oyonnax |
| | Report |

Stade Pierre-Antoine
Attendance: 8,211
Referee: Tual Trainini

12 September 2015
14:45

| (1 BP) Toulon | 45–24 | La Rochelle |
| | Report |

Stade Mayol
Attendance: 12,653
Referee: Cyril Lafon

12 September 2015
18:30

| Racing | 23–14 | Grenoble |
| | Report |

Stade Olympique Yves-du-Manoir
Attendance: 5,983
Referee: Salem Attalah

12 September 2015
18:30

| (1 BP) Montpellier | 44–20 | Stade Français |
| | Report |

Altrad Stadium
Attendance: 9,875
Referee: Maxime Chalon

12 September 2015
18:30

| Clermont | 26–26 | Bordeaux Bègles |
| | Report |

Stade Marcel-Michelin
Attendance: 15,672
Referee: Thomas Charabas

13 September 2015
12:30

| Brive | 18–12 | Agen |
| | Report |

Stade Amédée-Domenech
Attendance: 9,891
Referee: Laurent Cardona

13 September 2015
17:00

| Pau | 9–6 | Toulouse (1 BP) |
| | Report |

Stade du Hameau
Attendance: 14,000
Referee: Adrien Descottes

=== Round 5 ===
16 October 2015
19:45

| Agen | 16–31 | Bordeaux Bègles |
| | Report |

Stade Armandie
Attendance: 8,052
Referee: Mathieu Raynal

16 October 2015
19:45

| (1 BP) Clermont | 35–10 | Pau |
| | Report |

Stade Marcel-Michelin
Attendance: 14,622
Referee: Cédric Marchat

16 October 2015
19:45

| Grenoble | 19–30 | Montpellier |
| | Report |

Stade des Alpes
Attendance: 12,100
Referee: Sébastien Minery

16 October 2015
19:45

| Oyonnax | 9–18 | Racing |
| | Report |

Stade Charles-Mathon
Attendance: 10,500
Referee: Alexandre Ruiz

16 October 2015
19:45

| Stade Français | 22–9 | Castres |
| | Report |

Stade Jean-Bouin
Attendance: 10,156
Referee: Cyril Lafon

16 October 2015
21:00

| Toulouse | 39–22 | La Rochelle |
| | Report |

Stade Ernest-Wallon
Attendance: 13,129
Referee: Maxime Chalon

17 October 2015
14:45

| Brive | 29–26 | Toulon (1 BP) |
| | Report |

Stade Amédée-Domenech
Attendance: 12,062
Referee: Salem Attalah

=== Round 6 ===
23 October 2015
19:45

| Racing | 27–18 | Stade Français |
| | Report |

Stade Olympique Yves-du-Manoir
Attendance: 9,051
Referee: Mathieu Raynal

24 October 2015
14:00

| Castres | 23–31 | Grenoble |
| | Report |

Stade Pierre-Antoine
Attendance: 8,504
Referee: Laurent Cardona

24 October 2015
14:00

| (1 BP) Pau | 13–18 | Brive |
| | Report |

Stade du Hameau
Attendance: 10,500
Referee: Tual Trainini

24 October 2015
14:00

| (1 BP) Toulon | 61–3 | Oyonnax |
| | Report |

Stade Mayol
Attendance: 13,262
Referee: Sébastien Minery

24 October 2015
14:30

| Bordeaux Bègles | 12–10 | Toulouse (1 BP) |
| | Report |

Stade Chaban-Delmas
Attendance: 31,189
Referee: Alexandre Ruiz

24 October 2015
20:45

| Montpellier | 24–19 | Clermont (1 BP) |
| | Report |

Altrad Stadium
Attendance: 14,739
Referee: Cyril Lafon

25 October 2015
12:30

| (1 BP) La Rochelle | 23–6 | Agen |
| | Report |

Stade Marcel-Deflandre
Attendance: 14,893
Referee: Adrien Descottes

=== Round 7 ===
31 October 2015
14:00

| Agen | 28–23 | Stade Français (1 BP) |
| | Report |

Stade Armandie
Attendance: 7,571
Referee: Alexandre Ruiz

31 October 2015
14:00

| Bordeaux Bègles | 21–16 | La Rochelle (1 BP) |
| | Report |

Stade Chaban-Delmas
Attendance: 21,123
Referee: Cédric Marchat

31 October 2015
14:00

| (1 BP) Oyonnax | 42–23 | Pau |
| | Report |

Stade Charles-Mathon
Attendance: 10,000
Referee: Thomas Charabas

31 October 2015
14:00

| Racing | 17–14 | Brive (1 BP) |
| | Report |

Stade Yves-du-Manoir
Attendance: 6,257
Referee: Sébastien Minery

31 October 2015
14:30

| Montpellier | 25–33 | Toulouse |
| | Report |

Altrad Stadium
Attendance: 13,015
Referee: Laurent Cardona

31 October 2015
20:45

| (1 BP) Clermont | 42–13 | Castres |
| | Report |

Stade Marcel-Michelin
Attendance: 16,288
Referee: Maxime Chalon

1 November 2015
16:15

| Grenoble | 33–29 | Toulon (1 BP) |
| | Report |

Stade des Alpes
Attendance: 16,700
Referee: Cyril Lafon

=== Round 8 ===
7 November 2015
14:45

| (1 BP) Toulon | 52–8 | Montpellier |
| | Report |

Stade Mayol
Attendance: 12,879
Referee: Juan Sylvestre (UAR)

7 November 2015
18:30

| Brive | 16–3 | Bordeaux Bègles |
| | Report |

Stade Amédée-Domenech
Attendance: 11,779
Referee: Adrien Descottes

7 November 2015
18:30

| (1 BP) La Rochelle | 38–3 | Oyonnax |
| | Report |

Stade Marcel-Deflandre
Attendance: 14,876
Referee: Mathieu Raynal

7 November 2015
18:30

| Pau | 33–31 | Agen (1 BP) |
| | Report |

Stade du Hameau
Attendance: 12,000
Referee: Salem Attalah

7 November 2015
20:45

| (1 BP) Toulouse | 52–12 | Grenoble |
| | Report |

Stade Ernest-Wallon
Attendance: 16,122
Referee: Rasta Rasivhenge (SARU)

8 November 2015
12:15

| (1 BP) Castres | 34–8 | Racing |
| | Report |

Stade Pierre-Antoine
Attendance: 9,012
Referee: Romain Poite

8 November 2015
16:15

| Stade Français | 14–9 | Clermont (1 BP) |
| | Report |

Stade Jean-Bouin
Attendance: 18,395
Referee: Tual Trainini

=== Round 9 ===
27 November 2015
20:45

| Montpellier | 25–20 | La Rochelle (1 BP) |
| | Report |

Altrad Stadium
Attendance: 8,000
Referee: Romain Poite

28 November 2015
14:45

| Racing | 28–13 | Toulouse |
| | Report |

Stade Olympique Yves-du-Manoir
Attendance: 11,689
Referee: Cyril Lafon

28 November 2015
18:30

| Oyonnax | 9–34 | Brive (1 BP) |
| | Report |

Stade Charles-Mathon
Attendance: 9,500
Referee: Cédric Marchat

28 November 2015
18:30

| (1 BP) Bordeaux Bègles | 46–10 | Pau |
| | Report |

Stade Chaban-Delmas
Attendance: 20,663
Referee: Maxime Chalon

28 November 2015
18:30

| (1 BP) Agen | 18–23 | Castres |
| | Report |

Stade Armandie
Attendance: 8,290
Referee: Jérôme Garcès

28 November 2015
20:45

| Clermont | 9–35 | Toulon (1 BP) |
| | Report |

Stade Marcel-Michelin
Attendance: 18,095
Referee: Mathieu Raynal

29 November 2015
16:15

| (1 BP) Grenoble | 19–21 | Stade Français |
| | Report |

Stade des Alpes
Attendance: 13,000
Referee: Pascal Gaüzère

=== Round 10 ===
4 December 2015
20:45

| Pau | 15–15 | Racing |
| | Report |

Stade du Hameau
Attendance: 13,500
Referee: Sébastien Minery

5 December 2015
14:45

| (1 BP) Toulon | 53–23 | Agen |
| | Report |

Stade Mayol
Attendance: 12,341
Referee: Laurent Cardona

5 December 2015
18:30

| (1 BP) Castres | 34–19 | Montpellier |
| | Report |

Stade Pierre-Antoine
Attendance: 8,532
Referee: Thomas Charabas

5 December 2015
18:30

| La Rochelle | 33–16 | Grenoble |
| | Report |

Stade Marcel-Deflandre
Attendance: 14,537
Referee: Tual Trainini

5 December 2015
18:30

| (1 BP) Stade Français | 21–24 | Bordeaux Bègles |
| | Report |

Stade Jean-Bouin
Attendance: 11,273
Referee: Romain Poite

5 December 2015
20:45

| (1 BP) Toulouse | 27–3 | Oyonnax |
| | Report |

Stade Ernest-Wallon
Attendance: 10,503
Referee: Adrien Descottes

6 December 2015
16:15

| (1 BP) Brive | 21–26 | Clermont |
| | Report |

Stade Amédée-Domenech
Attendance: 13,543
Referee: Jérôme Garcès

=== Round 11 ===
27 December 2015
14:00

| Oyonnax | 25–12 | Stade Français |
| | Report |

Stade Charles-Mathon
Attendance: 10,500
Referee: Mathieu Raynal

27 December 2015
16:00

| Pau | 15–11 | La Rochelle (1 BP) |
| | Report |

Stade du Hameau
Attendance: 13,500
Referee: Cédric Marchat

27 December 2015
16:00

| (1 BP) Montpellier | 45–20 | Agen |
| | Report |

Altrad Stadium
Attendance: 10,128
Referee: Tual Trainini

27 December 2015
16:00

| Castres | 23–8 | Brive |
| | Report |

Stade Pierre-Antoine
Attendance: 10,280
Referee: Adrien Descottes

27 December 2015
16:00

| Bordeaux Bègles | 25–19 | Grenoble |
| | Report |

Stade Chaban-Delmas
Attendance: 25,238
Referee: Salem Attalah

27 December 2015
18:00

| (1 BP) Clermont | 16–20 | Racing |
| | Report |

Stade Marcel-Michelin
Attendance: 17,995
Referee: Alexandre Ruiz

27 December 2015
21:00

| (1 BP) Toulouse | 31–8 | Toulon |
| | Report |

Stadium Municipal
Attendance: 32,479
Referee: Maxime Chalon

=== Round 12 ===
2 January 2016
14:30

| Agen | 16–33 | Clermont |
| | Report |

Stade Armandie
Attendance: 8,647
Referee: Romain Poite

2 January 2016
15:00

| La Rochelle | 25–21 | Castres (1 BP) |
| | Report |

Stade Marcel-Deflandre
Attendance: 15,000
Referee: Sébastien Minery

2 January 2016
15:00

| (1 BP) Grenoble | 42–17 | Oyonnax |
| | Report |

Stade des Alpes
Attendance: 14,000
Referee: Jérôme Garcès

2 January 2016
16:30

| Racing | 23–18 | Bordeaux Bègles (1 BP) |
| | Report |

Stade Yves-du-Manoir
Attendance: 7,765
Referee: Thomas Charabas

2 January 2016
20:45

| Brive | 19–18 | Montpellier (1 BP) |
| | Report |

Stade Amédée-Domenech
Attendance: 10,852
Referee: Pascal Gaüzère

3 January 2016
17:45

| Toulon | 21–17 | Pau (1 BP) |
| | Report |

Stade Mayol
Attendance: 12,135
Referee: Cyril Lafon

3 January 2016
21:00

| Stade Français | 18–17 | Toulouse (1 BP) |
| | Report |

Stade Jean-Bouin
Attendance: 15,000
Referee: Laurent Cardona

=== Round 13 ===
Due to the terrorist attacks that took place in Paris on 13 November 2015, matches in the European Rugby Champions Cup and European Rugby Challenge Cup were postponed to a later date – later announced to take place on the weekend of 8–10 January 2016. This meant the fixtures that featured those teams in their respective domestic leagues, were postponed to a later date. This meant that the entire Round 13 schedule was postponed: one match was moved to mid-February, and the remaining six matches were moved to mid-March.

=== Round 14 ===
29 January 2016
20:45

| Brive | 28–6 | La Rochelle |
| | Report |

Stade Amédée-Domenech
Attendance: 10,586
Referee: Romain Poite

30 January 2016
14:45

| (1 BP) Clermont | 15–19 | Montpellier |
| | Report |

Stade Marcel-Michelin
Attendance: 16,514
Referee: Salem Attalah

30 January 2016
18:30

| Agen | 27–33 | Grenoble |
| | Report |

Stade Armandie
Attendance: 7,174
Referee: Cyril Lafon

30 January 2016
18:30

| Castres | 19–9 | Bordeaux Bègles |
| | Report |

Stade Pierre-Antoine
Attendance: 8,608
Referee: Maxime Chalon

30 January 2016
18:30

| (1 BP) Racing | 26–3 | Oyonnax |
| | Report |

Stade Yves-du-Manoir
Attendance: 7,109
Referee: Sébastien Minery

30 January 2016
20:45

| (1 BP) Toulouse | 54–3 | Pau |
| | Report |

Stade Ernest-Wallon
Attendance: 14,027
Referee: Adrien Descottes

31 January 2016
16:15

| Toulon | 23–16 | Stade Français |
| | Report |

Allianz Riviera
Attendance: 29,414
Referee: Jérôme Garcès

=== Round 13 rescheduled match ===
14 February 2016
16:15

| Bordeaux Bègles | 15–12 | Toulon (1 BP) |
| | Report |

Matmut Atlantique
Attendance: 38,416
Referee: Romain Poite

=== Round 15 ===
19 February 2016
20:45

| Stade Français | 32–17 | Brive |
| | Report |

Stade Jean-Bouin
Attendance: 10,290
Referee: Alexandre Ruiz

20 February 2016
14:45

| Castres | 17–28 | Clermont |
| | Report |

Stade Pierre-Antoine
Attendance: 9,622
Referee: Mathieu Raynal

20 February 2016
18:30

| Bordeaux Bègles | 24–19 | Agen (1 BP) |
| | Report |

Stade Chaban-Delmas
Attendance: 21,233
Referee: Cédric Marchat

20 February 2016
18:30

| (1 BP) Montpellier | 16–19 | Pau |
| | Report |

Altrad Stadium
Attendance: 10,525
Referee: Thomas Charabas

20 February 2016
18:30

| (1 BP) Grenoble | 35–39 | Racing (1 BP) |
| | Report |

Stade des Alpes
Attendance: 18,000
Referee: Laurent Cardona

20 February 2016
20:45

| La Rochelle | 28–8 | Toulouse |
| | Report |

Stade Marcel-Deflandre
Attendance: 15,000
Referee: Tual Trainini

21 February 2016
16:15

| Oyonnax | 13–44 | Toulon (1 BP) |
| | Report |

Stade Charles-Mathon
Attendance: 12,000
Referee: Pascal Gaüzère

=== Round 16 ===
27 February 2016
14:30

| (1 BP) Toulon | 44–15 | Brive |
| | Report |

Stade Mayol
Attendance: 12,519
Referee: Cédric Marchat

27 February 2016
18:30

| Stade Français | 18–33 | Grenoble |
| | Report |

Stade Jean-Bouin
Attendance: 8,652
Referee: Sébastien Minery

27 February 2016
18:30

| Agen | 31–27 | La Rochelle (1 BP) |
| | Report |

Stade Armandie
Attendance: 7,767
Referee: Maxime Chalon

27 February 2016
18:30

| (1 BP) Clermont | 44–16 | Oyonnax |
| | Report |

Stade Marcel-Michelin
Attendance: 14,791
Referee: Laurent Cardona

27 February 2016
18:30

| Pau | 3–15 | Bordeaux Bègles |
| | Report |

Stade du Hameau
Attendance: 11,000
Referee: Cyril Lafon

27 February 2016
20:45

| (1 BP) Racing | 9–13 | Castres |
| | Report |

Stade Yves-du-Manoir
Attendance: 6,433
Referee: Salem Attalah

28 February 2016
16:15

| (1 BP) Toulouse | 29–31 | Montpellier |
| | Report |

Stade Ernest-Wallon
Attendance: 12,831
Referee: Jérôme Garcès

=== Round 17 ===
4 March 2016
20:45

| Grenoble | 12–45 | Clermont (1 BP) |
| | Report |

Stade des Alpes
Attendance: 15,500
Referee: Jérôme Garcès

5 March 2016
14:45

| Brive | 21–21 | Toulouse |
| | Report |

Stade Amédée-Domenech
Attendance: 12,703
Referee: Pascal Gaüzère

5 March 2016
18:30

| (1 BP) Bordeaux Bègles | 48–20 | Oyonnax |
| | Report |

Stade Chaban-Delmas
Attendance: 22,127
Referee: Tual Trainini

5 March 2016
18:30

| Pau | 19–12 | Stade Français |
| | Report |

Stade du Hameau
Attendance: 11,000
Referee: Romain Poite

5 March 2016
18:30

| (1 BP) Racing | 38–13 | Agen |
| | Report |

Stade Yves-du-Manoir
Attendance: 6,000
Referee: Adrien Descottes

5 March 2016
20:45

| Montpellier | 22–19 | Castres (1 BP) |
| | Report |

Altrad Stadium
Attendance: 10,943
Referee: Laurent Cardona

6 March 2016
16:15

| La Rochelle | 19–14 | Toulon (1 BP) |
| | Report |

Stade Marcel-Deflandre
Attendance: 15,000
Referee: Mathieu Raynal

=== Round 18 ===
11 March 2016
20:45

| Toulouse | 13–13 | Bordeaux Bègles |
| | Report |

Stade Ernest-Wallon
Attendance: 16,500
Referee: Salem Attalah

12 March 2016
14:30

| Stade Français | 16–34 | Racing (1 BP) |
| | Report |

Stade Jean-Bouin
Attendance: 20,000
Referee: Pascal Gaüzère

12 March 2016
18:30

| (1 BP) Castres | 50–6 | Agen |
| | Report |

Stade Pierre-Antoine
Attendance: 8,660
Referee: Thomas Charabas

12 March 2016
18:30

| (1 BP) Clermont | 25–6 | Brive |
| | Report |

Stade Marcel-Michelin
Attendance: 18,100
Referee: Adrien Descottes

12 March 2016
18:30

| (1 BP) La Rochelle | 35–16 | Pau |
| | Report |

Stade Marcel-Deflandre
Attendance: 15,000
Referee: Sébastien Minery

12 March 2016
20:45

| (1 BP) Toulon | 38–8 | Grenoble |
| | Report |

Stade Mayol
Attendance: 12,832
Referee: Maxime Chalon

13 March 2016
12:00

| Oyonnax | 10–31 | Montpellier (1 BP) |
| | Report |

Stade Charles-Mathon
Attendance: 8,500
Referee: Cédric Marchat

=== Round 13 rescheduled matches ===
19 March 2016
14:00

| (1 BP) Stade Français | 33–20 | La Rochelle |
| | Report |

Stade Jean-Bouin
Attendance: 9,654
Referee: Salem Attalah

19 March 2016
14:30

| (1 BP) Montpellier | 60–7 | Racing |
| | Report |

Altrad Stadium
Attendance: 13,158
Referee: Mathieu Raynal

19 March 2016
18:00

| Oyonnax | 30–28 | Agen (1 BP) |
| | Report |

Stade Charles-Mathon
Attendance: 7,000
Referee: Jérôme Garcès

19 March 2016
18:00

| Pau | 21–16 | Castres (1 BP) |
| | Report |

Stade du Hameau
Attendance: 11,067
Referee: Maxime Chalon

20 March 2016
14:00

| Grenoble | 26–22 | Brive (1 BP) |
| | Report |

Stade des Alpes
Attendance: 10,000
Referee: Sébastien Minery

20 March 2016
16:15

| Clermont | 32–23 | Toulouse |
| | Report |

Stade Marcel-Michelin
Attendance: 18,730
Referee: Cyril Lafon

=== Round 19 ===
26 March 2016
14:45

| (1 BP) Racing | 20–21 | Toulon |
| | Report |

Stade Pierre-Mauroy
Attendance: 40,500
Referee: Laurent Cardona

26 March 2016
18:30

| Agen | 21–45 | Montpellier (1 BP) |
| | Report |

Stade Armandie
Attendance: 8,150
Referee: Maxime Chalon

26 March 2016
18:30

| Brive | 23–22 | Castres (1 BP) |
| | Report |

Stade Amédée-Domenech
Attendance: 10,892
Referee: Jérôme Garcès

26 March 2016
18:30

| (1 BP) Grenoble | 39–23 | La Rochelle |
| | Report |

Stade des Alpes
Attendance: 13,500
Referee: Tual Trainini

26 March 2016
20:45

| (1 BP) Pau | 25–6 | Oyonnax |
| | Report |

Stade du Hameau
Attendance: 11,834
Referee: Adrien Descottes

27 March 2016
16:15

| (1 BP) Bordeaux Bègles | 19–24 | Clermont |
| | Report |

Stade Chaban-Delmas
Attendance: 28,332
Referee: Romain Poite

27 March 2016
21:00

| (1 BP) Toulouse | 36–3 | Stade Français |
| | Report |

Stadium Municipal
Attendance: 21,048
Referee: Thomas Charabas

=== Round 20 ===
1 April 2016
20:45

| Montpellier | 19–3 | Brive |
| | Report |

Altrad Stadium
Attendance: 10,542
Referee: Salem Attalah

2 April 2016
14:45

| Castres | 15–9 | Toulouse |
| | Report |

Stade Pierre-Antoine
Attendance: 10,500
Referee: Alexandre Ruiz

2 April 2016
18:30

| Agen | 26–33 | Pau |
| | Report |

Stade Armandie
Attendance: 7,828
Referee: Pascal Gaüzère

2 April 2016
18:30

| La Rochelle | 21–18 | Stade Français (1 BP) |
| | Report |

Stade Marcel-Deflandre
Attendance: 15,000
Referee: Cyril Lafon

2 April 2016
18:30

| Oyonnax | 20–27 | Grenoble |
| | Report |

Stade Charles-Mathon
Attendance: 8,500
Referee: Romain Poite

2 April 2016
20:45

| Bordeaux Bègles | 20–28 | Racing |
| | Report |

Matmut Atlantique
Attendance: 33,000
Referee: Cédric Marchat

3 April 2016
16:15

| (1 BP) Toulon | 18–19 | Clermont |
| | Report |

Stade Vélodrome
Attendance: 57,886
Referee: Mathieu Raynal

=== Round 21 ===
15 April 2016
20:45

| (1 BP) Grenoble | 28–33 | Castres |
| | Report |

Stade des Alpes
Attendance: 14,700
Referee: Cyril Lafon

16 April 2016
14:45

| Pau | 9–25 | Toulon (1 BP) |
| | Report |

Stade du Hameau
Attendance: 13,800
Referee: Thomas Charabas

16 April 2016
18:30

| (1 BP) Brive | 31–13 | Oyonnax |
| | Report |

Stade Amédée-Domenech
Attendance: 10,352
Referee: Sébastien Minery

16 April 2016
18:30

| (1 BP) Clermont | 38–10 | Agen |
| | Report |

Stade Marcel-Michelin
Attendance: 17,465
Referee: Tual Trainini

16 April 2016
20:45

| La Rochelle | 22–15 | Bordeaux Bègles |
| | Report |

Stade Marcel-Deflandre
Attendance: 15,000
Referee: Pascal Gaüzère

17 April 2016
14:30

| Stade Français | 20–26 | Montpellier |
| | Report |

Stade Jean-Bouin
Attendance: 11,893
Referee: Romain Poite

17 April 2016
16:15

| Toulouse | 14–3 | Racing |
| | Report |

Stadium Municipal
Attendance: 28,583
Referee: Mathieu Raynal

=== Round 22 ===
30 April 2016
14:45

| (1 BP) Toulon | 10–12 | Toulouse |
| | Report |

Allianz Riviera
Attendance: 27,549
Referee: Jérôme Garcès

30 April 2016
18:30

| (1 BP) Agen | 37–19 | Brive |
| | Report |

Stade Armandie
Attendance: 7,828
Referee: Mathieu Raynal

30 April 2016
18:30

| (1 BP) Castres | 37–6 | Pau |
| | Report |

Stade Pierre-Antoine
Attendance: 9,300
Referee: Adrien Descottes

30 April 2016
18:30

| (1 BP) Montpellier | 51–10 | Grenoble |
| | Report |

Altrad Stadium
Attendance: 10,702
Referee: Cédric Marchat

30 April 2016
18:30

| Oyonnax | 17–16 | La Rochelle (1 BP) |
| | Report |

Stade Charles-Mathon
Attendance: 7,000
Referee: Maxime Chalon

30 April 2016
20:45

| Bordeaux Bègles | 35–25 | Stade Français |
| | Report |

Matmut Atlantique
Attendance: 25,000
Referee: Laurent Cardona

1 May 2016
16:15

| Racing | 26–20 | Clermont |
| | Report |

Stade Yves-du-Manoir
Attendance: 13,518
Referee: Salem Attalah

=== Round 23 ===
6 May 2016
20:45

| Grenoble | 14–20 | Bordeaux Bègles |
| | Report |

Stade des Alpes
Attendance: 12,000
Referee: Alexandre Ruiz

7 May 2016
15:00

| (1 BP) La Rochelle | 36–10 | Montpellier |
| | Report |

Stade Marcel-Deflandre
Attendance: 15,000
Referee: Mathieu Raynal

7 May 2016
15:00

| Pau | 10–16 | Clermont |
| | Report |

Stade du Hameau
Attendance: 13,355
Referee: Pascal Gaüzère

7 May 2016
15:00

| (1 BP) Stade Français | 69–8 | Oyonnax |
| | Report |

Stade Jean-Bouin
Attendance: 10,000
Referee: Thomas Charabas

7 May 2016
16:30

| Brive | 33–27 | Racing |
| | Report |

Stade Amédée-Domenech
Attendance: 11,754
Referee: Tual Trainini

8 May 2016
16:15

| (1 BP) Toulouse | 52–19 | Agen |
| | Report |

Stade Ernest-Wallon
Attendance: 12,576
Referee: Laurent Cardona

8 May 2016
21:00

| Toulon | 17–7 | Castres |
| | Report |

Stade Mayol
Attendance: 15,000
Referee: Romain Poite

=== Round 24 ===
21 May 2016
14:30

| Agen | 13–52 | Toulon (1 BP) |
| | Report |

Stade Armandie
Attendance: 9,728
Referee: Cyril Lafon

21 May 2016
15:00

| (1 BP) Brive | 45–24 | Grenoble |
| | Report |

Stade Amédée-Domenech
Attendance: 10,048
Referee: Salem Attalah

21 May 2016
15:00

| (1 BP) Castres | 67–20 | La Rochelle |
| | Report |

Stade Pierre-Antoine
Attendance: 8,800
Referee: Sébastien Minery

21 May 2016
15:00

| Oyonnax | 17–25 | Toulouse |
| | Report |

Stade Charles-Mathon
Attendance: 9,000
Referee: Adrien Descottes

21 May 2016
15:00

| (1 BP) Racing | 43–13 | Pau |
| | Report |

Stade Yves-du-Manoir
Attendance: 6,000
Referee: Maxime Chalon

21 May 2016
16:35

| Montpellier | 19–16 | Bordeaux Bègles (1 BP) |
| | Report |

Altrad Stadium
Attendance: 11,707
Referee: Mathieu Raynal

22 May 2016
16:15

| Clermont | 36–10 | Stade Français |
| | Report |

Stade Marcel-Michelin
Attendance: 18,676
Referee: Cédric Marchat

=== Round 25 ===
27 May 2016
20:45

| La Rochelle | 14–30 | Racing |
| | Report |

Stade Marcel-Deflandre
Attendance: 15,000
Referee: Thomas Charabas

28 May 2016
15:30

| (1 BP) Bordeaux Bègles | 34–7 | Brive |
| | Report |

Stade Chaban-Delmas
Attendance: 26,273
Referee: Alexandre Ruiz

28 May 2016
18:30

| (1 BP) Pau | 29–12 | Grenoble |
| | Report |

Stade du Hameau
Attendance: 10,863
Referee: Tual Trainini

28 May 2016
18:30

| Stade Français | 28–26 | Agen (1 BP) |
| | Report |

MMArena
Attendance: 9,014
Referee: Adrien Descottes

28 May 2016
20:45

| (1 BP) Oyonnax | 20–25 | Castres |
| | Report |

Stade Charles-Mathon
Attendance: 9,000
Referee: Laurent Cardona

29 May 2016
16:30

| Toulouse | 22–11 | Clermont |
| | Report |

Stade Ernest-Wallon
Attendance: 18,831
Referee: Pascal Gaüzère

29 May 2016
20:45

| Montpellier | 36–21 | Toulon |
| | Report |

Altrad Stadium
Attendance: 15,000
Referee: Romain Poite

=== Round 26 ===
5 June 2016
20:45

| Agen | 23–19 | Oyonnax (1 BP) |
| | Report |

Stade Armandie
Attendance: 7,409
Referee: Pascal Gaüzère

5 June 2016
20:45

| (1 BP) Brive | 46–10 | Pau |
| | Report |

Stade Amédée-Domenech
Attendance: 9,586
Referee: Sébastien Minery

5 June 2016
20:45

| Castres | 35–14 | Stade Français |
| | Report |

Stade Pierre-Antoine
Attendance: 10,200
Referee: Tual Trainini

5 June 2016
20:45

| (1 BP) Clermont | 57–8 | La Rochelle |
| | Report |

Stade Marcel-Michelin
Attendance: 18,679
Referee: Maxime Chalon

5 June 2016
20:45

| Grenoble | 14–53 | Toulouse (1 BP) |
| | Report |

Stade des Alpes
Attendance: 14,000
Referee: Mathieu Raynal

5 June 2016
20:45

| Racing | 40–25 | Montpellier |
| | Report |

Stade Olympique Yves-du-Manoir
Attendance: 10,064
Referee: Salem Attalah

5 June 2016
20:45

| (1 BP) Toulon | 44–3 | Bordeaux Bègles |
| | Report |

Stade Mayol
Attendance: 13,821
Referee: Cédric Marchat

== Playoffs ==
Quarterfinals
4 | Racing | 21
5 | Toulouse | 16
3 | Montpellier | 28
6 | Castres | 9

Semifinals
1 | Clermont | 33
4 | Racing | 34
2 | Toulon | 27
3 | Montpellier | 18

Final
4 | Racing | 29
2 | Toulon | 21

=== Semi-final Qualifiers ===
11 June 2016
20:45

| Racing | 21–16 | Toulouse |
| Pen: Carter (6/6) 5', 13', 17', 21', 64', 75'; Goosen (1/3) 48' | Report | Try: Fickou 67' c Con: Bézy (1/1); Pen: Bézy (3/4) 10', 26', 43' |

Stade Olympique Yves-du-Manoir
Attendance: 9,891
Referee: Pascal Gaüzère

12 June 2016
16:15

| Montpellier | 28–9 | Castres |
| Try: Nagusa 13' m Willemse 52' c Spies 75' c Con: Catrakilis (2/3); Pen: Catrakilis (3/3) 9', 34', 74' | Report | Pen: Urdapilleta (1/2) 37'; Kockott (2/3) 49', 65' |

Altrad Stadium
Attendance: 11,656
Referee: Laurent Cardona

=== Semi-finals ===
17 June 2016
20:45

| Clermont | 33–34 (a.e.t.) | Racing |
| Try: Chouly 40' m Fofana 62' c Con: Lopez (1/1); Pen: Parra (1/2) 33'; Lopez (3/3) 42', 46', 53'; Spedding (1/2) 87'; Drop: Lopez (1/1) 4'; James (1/1) 92' | Report | Try: Goosen 27' c Rokocoko 47' m Imhoff 98' c Con: Carter (2/3); Pen: Carter (5/6) 16', 22', 25', 50', 58' |

Roazhon Park, Rennes
Attendance: 29,013
Referee: Alexandre Ruiz

18 June 2016
20:45

| Toulon | 27–18 | Montpellier |
| Try: Tuisova 32' m Nonu 43' c Con: Halfpenny (1/2); Pen: Halfpenny (5/6) 3', 11', 19', 50', 64' | Report | Try: Mogg (2) 54' m, 59' c Con: Catrakilis (1/2); Pen: Catrakilis (2/3) 8', 14' |

Roazhon Park, Rennes
Attendance: 28,937
Referee: Romain Poite

=== Final ===
The final took place on 24 June 2016 at the Camp Nou in Barcelona, Spain. The final was moved from its traditional site of the Stade de France in Saint-Denis because of a scheduling conflict with UEFA Euro 2016.

24 June 2016
20:45

| Toulon | 21–29 | Racing 92 |
| Try: Gorgodze 29' m Mermoz 71' c Con: Halfpenny (1/2); Pen: Halfpenny (3/3) 2', 19', 23' | Report | Try: Rokocoko 59' m Pen: Carter (5/5) 7', 25', 40', 58', 80'; Goosen (3/4) 33', 48', 51' |

Camp Nou, Barcelona
Attendance: 99,124
Referee: Mathieu Raynal

| FB | 15 | (Wales) Leigh Halfpenny | (substituted off) 74' |
| RW | 14 | (Fiji) Josua Tuisova | (substituted off) 63' |
| OC | 13 | (France) Mathieu Bastareaud |
| IC | 12 | (France) Maxime Mermoz |
| LW | 11 | (South Africa) Bryan Habana |
| FH | 10 | (Australia) Matt Giteau | (substituted off) 63' |
| SH | 9 | (France) Jonathan Pélissié |
| N8 | 8 | (England) Steffon Armitage | (substituted off) 52' (substituted on) 52' |
| OF | 7 | (Argentina) Juan Martín Fernández Lobbe |
| BF | 6 | (Georgia (country)) Mamuka Gorgodze | (substituted off) 65' |
| RL | 5 | (Georgia (country)) Konstantin Mikautadze | (substituted off) 57' |
| LL | 4 | (United States) Samu Manoa |
| TP | 3 | (Georgia (country)) Levan Chilachava | (substituted off) 63' |
| HK | 2 | (France) Guilhem Guirado (c) | (substituted off) 57' |
| LP | 1 | (France) Xavier Chiocci | (yellow card) 50' to 60' (substituted off) 74' |
Substitutions:
| HK | 16 | (France) Jean-Charles Orioli | (substituted on) 57' |
| PR | 17 | (France) Florian Fresia | (substituted on) 52' (substituted off) 52' (substituted on) 74' |
| LK | 18 | (France) Romain Taofifénua | (substituted on) 57' |
| FL | 19 | (France) Virgile Bruni | (substituted on) 65' |
| CE | 20 | (France) Théo Belan | (substituted on) 74' |
| FB | 21 | (England) Delon Armitage | (substituted on) 63' |
| FH | 22 | (France) Frédéric Michalak | (substituted on) 63' |
| PR | 23 | (Fiji) Manasa Saulo | (substituted on) 63' |
Coach:
(France) Bernard Laporte

| FB | 15 | (France) Brice Dulin |
| RW | 14 | (New Zealand) Joe Rokocoko |
| OC | 13 | (South Africa) Johan Goosen |
| IC | 12 | (France) Henry Chavancy |
| LW | 11 | (Argentina) Juan Imhoff |
| FH | 10 | (New Zealand) Dan Carter |
| SH | 9 | (France) Maxime Machenaud | (red card) 19' |
| N8 | 8 | (New Zealand) Chris Masoe | (substituted off) 74' |
| OF | 7 | (France) Yannick Nyanga |
| BF | 6 | (France) Wenceslas Lauret |
| RL | 5 | (Argentina) Manuel Carizza | (substituted off) 69' |
| LL | 4 | (France) Bernard Le Roux |
| TP | 3 | (Tonga) Ben Tameifuna | (substituted off) 63' (substituted on) 75' |
| HK | 2 | (France) Dimitri Szarzewski (c) | (substituted off) 63' |
| LP | 1 | (France) Eddy Ben Arous | (substituted off) 71' |
Substitutions:
| HK | 16 | (France) Camille Chat | (substituted on) 63' |
| PR | 17 | (France) Khatchik Vartan | (substituted on) 71' (substituted off) 75' |
| LK | 18 | (South Africa) Juandré Kruger | (substituted on) 69' |
| N8 | 19 | (France) Antonie Claassen | (substituted on) 74' |
| SH | 20 | (France) Xavier Chauveau |
| WG | 21 | (France) Marc Andreu |
| CE | 22 | (Fiji) Albert Vulivuli |
| PR | 23 | (France) Luc Ducalcon | (substituted on) 63' |
Coach:
(France) Laurent Travers
(France) Laurent Labit

- The attendance was a new record for any domestic club match in the sport.

== Leading scorers ==
Note: Flags to the left of player names indicate national team as has been defined under World Rugby eligibility rules, or primary nationality for players who have not yet earned international senior caps. Players may hold one or more non-WR nationalities.

=== Top points scorers ===
As of matches played on 5 June 2016.

| Rank | Player | Club | Points |
|---|---|---|---|
| 1 | (France) Gaëtan Germain | Brive | 319 |
| 2 | (Australia) Zack Holmes | La Rochelle | 251 |
| 3 | (South Africa) Burton Francis | Agen | 246 |
| 4 | (France) Jonathan Wisniewski | Grenoble | 237 |
| 5 | (France) Jules Plisson | Stade Français | 208 |
| 6 | (France) Jonathan Pélissié | Toulon | 199 |
| 7 | (South Africa) Demetri Catrakilis | Montpellier | 185 |
| 8 | (France) Sébastien Bézy | Toulouse | 178 |
| 9 | (France) Morgan Parra | Clermont | 166 |
| 10 | (Wales) Nicky Robinson | Oyonnax | 153 |

=== Top try scorers ===
| Rank | Player | Club | Tries |
|---|---|---|---|
| 1 | (Fiji) Timoci Nagusa | Montpellier | 16 |
| 2 | (Fiji) Josua Tuisova | Toulon | 12 |
| 3 | (Samoa) David Smith | Castres | 11 |
| 4 | (France) Gaël Fickou | Toulouse | 9 |
| 4 | (France) Marvin O'Connor | Montpellier | 9 |
| 4 | (England) David Strettle | Clermont | 9 |
| 4 | (New Zealand) Alex Tulou | Castres | 9 |
| 8 | (England) Delon Armitage | Toulon | 8 |
| 8 | (France) Djibril Camara | Stade Français | 8 |
| 8 | (South Africa) Bismarck du Plessis | Montpellier | 8 |
| 8 | (Australia) James O'Connor | Toulon | 8 |
| 8 | (Fiji) Alivereti Raka | Clermont | 8 |
| 8 | (New Zealand) George Tilsley | Agen | 8 |

== Attendances ==
=== By club ===
- Attendances do not include the semi-finals or final as these are at neutral venues.

| Club | Home Games | Total | Average | Highest | Lowest | % Capacity |
|---|---|---|---|---|---|---|
| Agen | 13 | 107,349 | 8,258 | 11,613 | 7,174 | 59% |
| Bordeaux Bègles | 13 | 332,437 | 25,572 | 38,416 | 19,712 | 70% |
| Brive | 13 | 145,272 | 11,175 | 13,543 | 9,586 | 70% |
| Castres | 13 | 120,704 | 9,285 | 10,500 | 8,211 | 81% |
| Clermont | 13 | 221,614 | 17,047 | 18,730 | 14,622 | 90% |
| Grenoble | 13 | 176,500 | 13,577 | 18,000 | 10,000 | 68% |
| La Rochelle | 13 | 194,173 | 14,936 | 15,000 | 14,537 | 100% |
| Montpellier (Note: Montpellier's attendance figure includes home semi-final qualifier.) | 14 | 159,840 | 11,417 | 15,000 | 8,000 | 78% |
| Oyonnax | 13 | 126,500 | 9,731 | 14,000 | 7,000 | 77% |
| Pau | 13 | 158,919 | 12,225 | 14,000 | 10,500 | 88% |
| Racing 92 (Note: Racing 92's attendance figure includes home semi-final qualifier.) | 14 | 146,452 | 10,461 | 40,500 | 5,983 | 60% |
| Stade Francais | 13 | 158,193 | 12,169 | 20,000 | 8,652 | 60% |
| Toulon | 13 | 246,903 | 18,993 | 57,886 | 12,135 | 85% |
| Toulouse | 13 | 226,632 | 17,433 | 32,479 | 10,503 | 76% |

=== Highest attendances ===
| Home club | Away club | Stadium | Attendance |
|---|---|---|---|
| Toulon | Clermont | Stade Vélodrome de Marseille | 57,886 |
| Bordeaux | Toulon | Matmut Atlantique | 38,416 |
| Bordeaux | Racing | Matmut Atlantique | 33,000 |
| Bordeaux | Stade Français | Matmut Atlantique | 25,000 |
| Toulouse | Toulon | Stadium Municipal de Toulouse | 32,479 |
| Bordeaux | Toulouse | Stade Chaban-Delmas | 31,189 |
| Toulon | Stade Français | Allianz Riviera | 29,414 |
| Toulouse | Racing | Stadium Municipal de Toulouse | 28,583 |
| Bordeaux | Clermont | Stade Chaban-Delmas | 28,332 |
| Toulon | Toulouse | Allianz Riviera | 27,549 |

== See also ==
- 2015–16 Rugby Pro D2 season
