= Xavier Chauveau =

French professional rugby union player

- Born: Xavier Chauveau; 14 October 1992 (age 34)
- Height: 1.80 m (5 ft 11 in)
- Weight: 84 kg (13 st 3 lb)

Rugby union career
- Position: Scrum-half
Senior career
Years	Team	Apps	(Points)
2013–2019	Racing 92	48	(7)
2019–	Agen	7	(0)
- Correct as of 30 November 2019

Xavier Chauveau is a French professional rugby union player. He plays scrum-half for Racing Métro in the Top 14.

== Honours ==
(France) Racing 92

- Top 14: 2015–16
