= Alexandre Bias =

French rugby union player

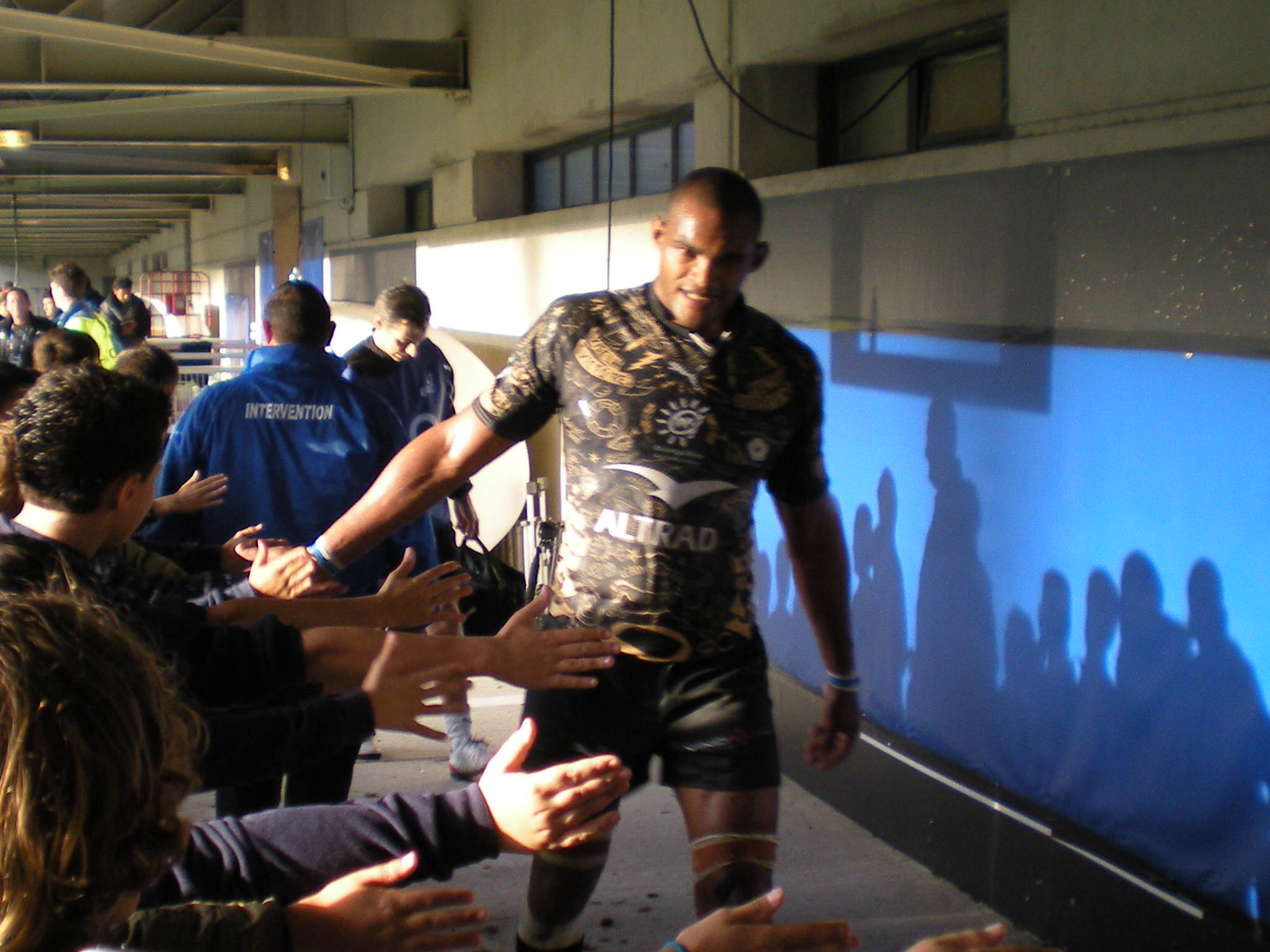
- Born: 21 April 1981 (age 45) Saint-Denis, France
- Height: 1.94 m (6 ft 4 1/2 in)
- Weight: 100 kg (15 st 10 lb)

Rugby union career
- Position: Flanker
Senior career
Years	Team	Apps	(Points)
2003–2004	CS Bourgoin-Jallieu	31	(0)
2004–2011	Castres Olympique	47	(15)
2011–2012	CA Brive	20	(0)
2012–2015	Montpellier	22	(0)
2015–	Castres Olympique	55	(25)
- Correct as of 9 November 2012

Alexandre Bias (born 21 April 1981) is a French rugby union player. His position is Flanker and he currently plays for Castres Olympique in the Top 14.
