= Franck Azéma =

French rugby union & league player (b.1971)

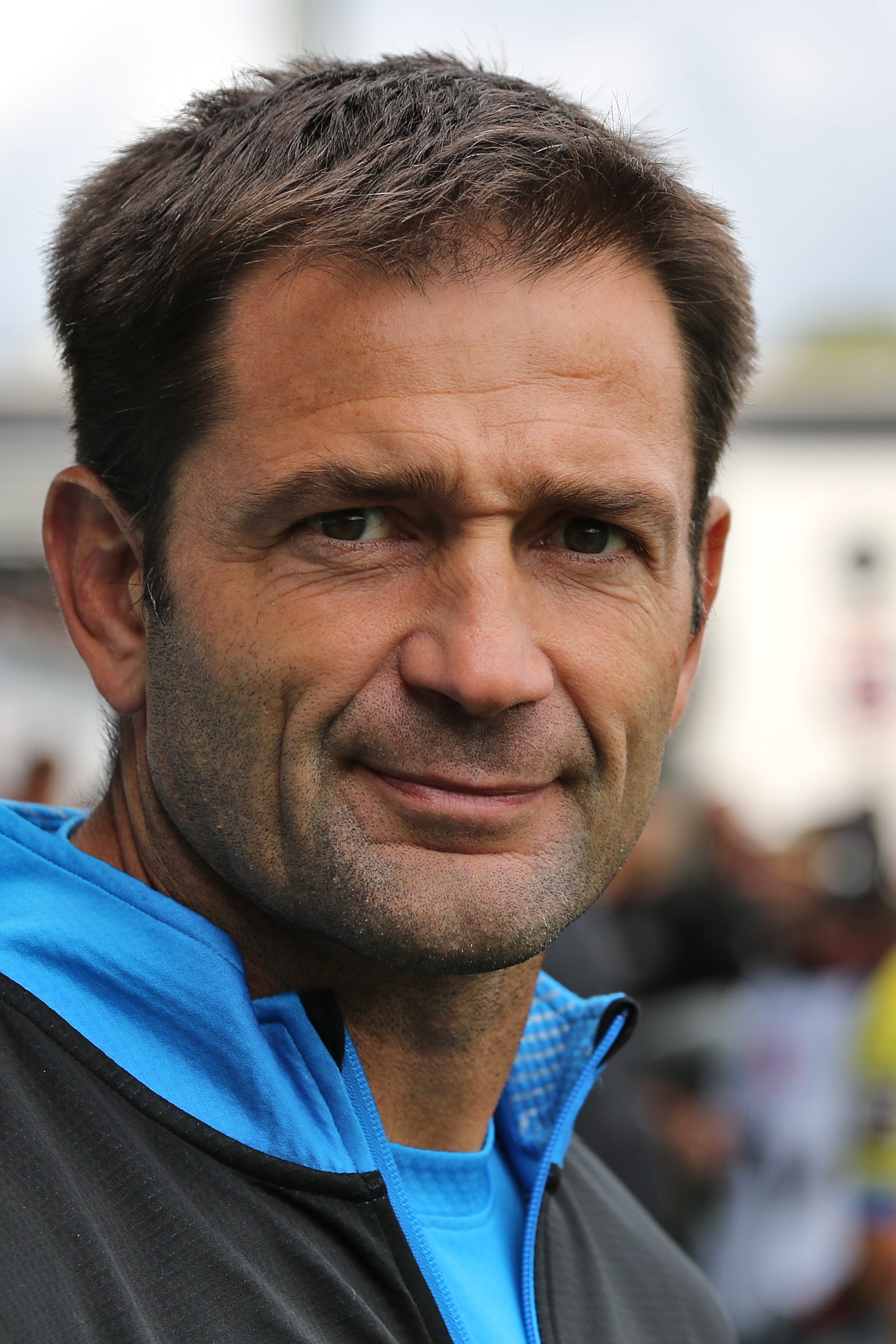
- Born: Franck Azéma; 7 April 1971 (age 55) Ambilly, France
- Height: 1.82 m (6 ft 0 in)

Rugby union career
- Position: Centre
Youth career
- Arles-sur-Tech
International career
Years	Team	Apps	(Points)
- France U21
Coaching career
- Years: Team
- 2002–2004: Céret sportif
- 2004–2006: Perpignan (youth)
- 2006–2010: Perpignan (backs)
- 2010–2014: Clermont (backs)
- 2014–2021: Clermont
- 2021–2023: Toulon
- 2023–2025: Perpignan

Franck Azéma (born 7 April 1971) is a French rugby union and is a former Top 14 Head Coach. He played as a centre.
