= Sébastien Bézy =

French rugby union player (born 1991)

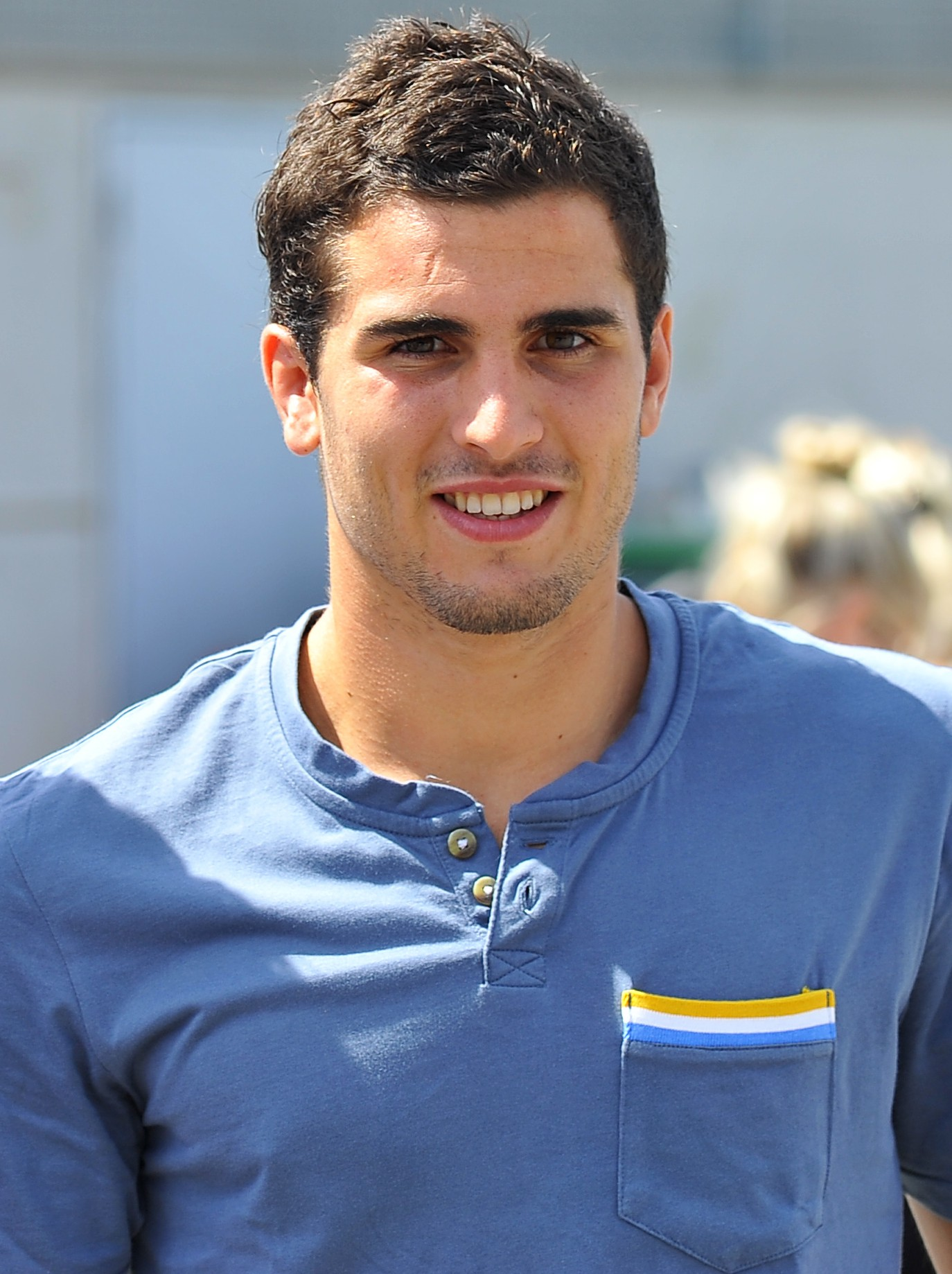
- Born: 22 November 1991 (age 34) France
- Height: 1.74 m (5 ft 9 in)
- Weight: 71.5 kg (11 st 4 lb; 158 lb)

Rugby union career
- Position: Scrum-half
Senior career
| Years | Team | Apps | (Points) |
| 2010–2020 | Toulouse | 152 | (479) |
| 2020– | Clermont | 132 | (78) |
- Correct as of 27 November 2020
International career
| Years | Team | Apps | (Points) |
| 2011 | France U20 | 2 | (0) |
| 2016– | France | 8 | (0) |
- Correct as of 6 Dec 2020

Sébastien Bézy (born 22 November 1991) is a French rugby union player. His position is scrum-half and he currently plays for Clermont in the Top 14. He is the younger brother of fellow half-back Nicolas Bézy, who currently plays for Provence Rugby.
