= George Clancy (rugby union) =

Irish rugby union referee (born 1977)

- Born: George Clancy; 12 January 1977 (age 49) Limerick, Ireland
- School: St Munchin's College
- Occupation: Revenue Commissioners

Rugby union career
- Position: Out–half/Fly–half
Senior career
Years	Team	Apps	(Points)
19xx–20xx	Bruff R.F.C.		
Refereeing career
Years	Competition		Apps
200x–	All-Ireland League		
2004–	Celtic League/Pro14		
2004	FIRA Women's European Championship		
200x–	European Rugby Challenge Cup		
2005–	European Rugby Champions Cup		
2005–2006	Under 21 Rugby World Championship		
2007	Churchill Cup		
2006–	Test Matches		
2006	→ Rugby World Cup qualifier		
2008–	→ Summer Internationals		
2009–	→ Six Nations Championship		
2010–	→ Rugby Championship		
2011–2015	→ Rugby World Cup		7

George Clancy is an Irish rugby union referee. Clancy refereed at the 2011 and 2015 Rugby World Cups. He has also refereed in the Pro14, the European Rugby Champions Cup, the Six Nations Championship and the Rugby Championship. Clancy refereed the 2007 Churchill Cup final and the 2009 and 2011 European Challenge Cup finals. Between 2013 and 2017 Clancy also served as a touch judge/assistant referee at five consecutive European Rugby Champions Cup finals.

== Early life ==
George Clancy is the son of Seoirse and Helen Clancy. He was raised in Bruff and he is the great grandnephew of George Clancy, a former Mayor of Limerick killed during the Irish War of Independence. Clancy was educated at St Munchin's College, where his fellow pupils included Marcus Horan and Jerry Flannery. He played rugby union for both St Munchin's and Bruff R.F.C. He also played both gaelic football and hurling for Bruff GAA. Clancy also represented Limerick at hurling. Clancy only gave up playing hurling when he was offered an IRFU refereeing contract which prohibited him playing sports that might result in an injury. He remains a hurling fan and he was attending a match between Bruff GAA and Ballybrown GAA when he received a phone call from Paddy O'Brien inviting him to referee the opening match of the 2011 Rugby World Cup. Clancy has a master's degree in international relations and worked as a tax official with the Revenue Commissioners before becoming a full-time referee. As of 2015, Clancy had been living with type 1 diabetes for over twenty years.

== Refereeing career ==
=== Early years ===
Clancy was encouraged to become a rugby union referee by his father. Seoirse Clancy was involved with Bruff R.F.C. and had refereed at a local level. He encouraged his son to take up refereeing after injuries, including a broken leg, prevented him from playing rugby union at a top level. In October 2000 Clancy refereed his first match, an U15s league match between Richmond and Garryowen which ended in a 0–0 draw. He subsequently began refereeing games in the All-Ireland League before making his Celtic League debut on 15 October 2004 when he took charge of a match between Borders and Gwent Dragons.

=== European competitions ===
On 15 January 2005 Clancy made his Heineken Cup debut when he took charge of a 2004–05 pool stage match between Bourgoin and Bath. He was originally supposed to be the touch judge for this match but after the original referee went sick, Clancy was called upon to replace him. On 22 May 2009 Clancy refereed the 2008–09 European Challenge Cup final between Northampton Saints and Bourgoin. He also refereed the 2010–11 European Challenge Cup final between Harlequins and Stade Français. Between 2013 and 2017 Clancy also served as a touch judge/assistant referee at five consecutive European Rugby Champions Cup finals.

=== Early internationals ===
Clancy refereed at the 2004 FIRA Women's European Championship and at the 2005 and 2006 Under 21 Rugby World Championships. He made his senior international debut on 30 September 2006 when he took charge of a 2007 Rugby World Cup qualifier between Uruguay and the United States. He also refereed the 2007 Churchill Cup final. In 2008 Clancy refereed his first top level internationals. On 1 June he took charge of a match between England and the Barbarians and on 21 June he refereed a match between South Africa and Italy. Clancy made his Six Nations Championship debut on 14 February 2009 when he took charge of a match between France and the Scotland. Clancy made his Rugby Championship debut on 24 July 2010 when he took charge of a match between Australia and South Africa.

=== Rugby World Cup ===
Clancy refereed the opening game of the 2011 Rugby World Cup, a pool stage game between New Zealand and Tonga. Clancy subsequently refereed three more pool stage matches during the tournament. Clancy was also selected to referee at the 2015 Rugby World Cup. Clancy refereed three pool stage matches at the 2015 tournament.

=== Controversies and incidents ===
During his refereeing career Clancy has been involved in several controversies and incidents. On his Six Nations Championship debut on 14 February 2009, Clancy awarded a try to France's Fulgence Ouedraogo against Scotland. Replays showed the final pass from Maxime Médard was forward. However, Clancy had been knocked to the ground in the move building up to the score. He consulted with his assistant before confirming the try.

On 5 December 2009, after refereeing an All-Ireland League match between Shannon and Cork Constitution, Clancy was verbally abused by Shannon supporters and club officials. Among the alleged abusers was Gerry McLoughlin. After the match had finished Martin Clancy, the Shannon president, entered the referees dressing room and continued to verbally abuse the referee. He was eventually removed by the two touch judges. Shannon were subsequently fined €25,000.

On 13 February 2010 during a match between Wales and Scotland, Clancy sin-binned Scotland's Phil Godman for an alleged off-the-ball trip on Lee Byrne. Byrne was later accused of deliberately diving to help Wales win.

On 10 April 2010, during a 2009–10 Heineken Cup quarter-final, between Biarritz and Ospreys, Clancy refused to award Ospreys a penalty towards the end of the match after an alleged knock-on by Biarritz's scrum-half, Dimitri Yachvili. The decision denied Ospreys a potential victory.

On 6 September 2014 Clancy refereed a match between Australia and South Africa. Clancy yellow carded South Africa's Bryan Habana for a high tackle on Adam Ashley-Cooper in the 65th minute. According to Paul Cully of The Sydney Morning Herald the decision was incorrect and was "the defining moment" of the match, costing South Africa a potential victory.

On 16 September 2017 Clancy was serving as a touch judge during a 2017–18 Pro14 match between Cardiff Blues and Glasgow Warriors. A disgruntled Cardiff Blues fan threw his pint of beer at Clancy because he allegedly was unhappy with a decision made by the officials. The act was caught on camera and the fan was quickly escorted from the ground.

== Honours ==
Individual

- Munster Rugby Referee of the Year
  - 2007
