= Peceli Yato =

Fijian rugby union player (born 1993)

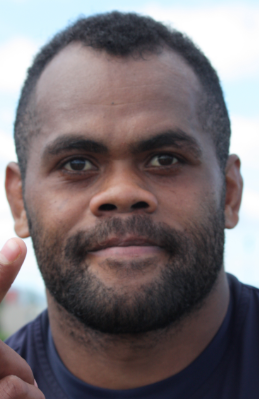
- Born: Peceli Yato; 17 January 1993 (age 33) Sigatoka, Fiji
- Height: 1.96 m (6 ft 5 in)
- Weight: 120 kg (18 st 13 lb; 260 lb)

Rugby union career
- Position: Flanker
Senior career
Years	Team	Apps	(Points)
2014–2025	Clermont	115	(210)
2025	USA Perpignan	17	(25)
- Correct as of 14 April 2025
International career
Years	Team	Apps	(Points)
2013	Fiji U20	12	(25)
2015–	Fiji	20	(30)
- Correct as of 14 April 2021

Perceli Yato (born 17 January 1993) is a Fijian rugby union player. He plays at flanker for USA Perpignan in the Top 14.

== Career ==
Yato was born in Sigatoka, the home of rugby in Fiji where he attended Waicoba District School and he got his secondary education at Sigatoka Valley High School and Sigatoka Mission College. He played for Fiji at the 2013 IRB Junior World Championship after which he was picked by ASM Clermont Auvergne as an espoir. He made his Top 14 debut off the bench against Bayonne RC in January 2014. In the 2014–15 Top 14 season, he played 10 games for Clermont scoring 7 tries, 2 of which was against Stade Français who went on to win that season.
