= Nick Abendanon =

English rugby union player

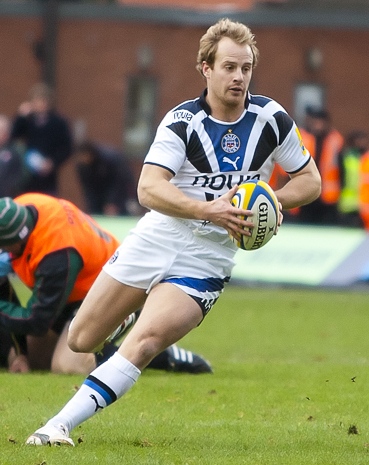
- Abendanon playing for Bath against Leicester
- Born: Nicholas Abendanon; 27 August 1986 (age 40) Bryanston, South Africa
- Height: 1.83 m (6 ft 0 in)
- Weight: 87 kg (13 st 10 lb)
- School: Beaudesert Park School; Cheltenham College

Rugby union career
- Position: Fullback / wing
Senior career
Years	Team	Apps	(Points)
2005–2014	Bath Rugby	207	(193)
2014–2020	Clermont Auvergne	95	(105)
2020–2023	Vannes	41	(50)
- Correct as of 18 October 2023
International career
Years	Team	Apps	(Points)
2007	England	2	(0)
National sevens team
Years	Team		Comps
2006	England		

Nick Abendanon (born 27 August 1986 in Bryanston, South Africa) is a former England international rugby union player. His preferred position was full-back. He has Dutch nationality through his parents.

== Career ==
Abendanon started playing during the 2006–07 season, scoring 10 tries in 24 first-team appearances for Bath. A strong tackler, balanced runner and dangerous counter-attacker, he firmly established himself as Bath's first-choice full-back in the post-Matt Perry era.

His form that season earned him a first England cap in South Africa – the country of his birth – in June 2007. He was capped again against France in August 2007, but narrowly missed out on a place in England's 30-man squad for the 2007 Rugby World Cup. However, he did eventually travel to France as cover for the final after an injury to Josh Lewsey.

Some fine performances during the 2008–09 season were rewarded with a call-up for the England Saxons squad for the 2009 Churchill Cup in the United States.

Retaining his place in the squad, Abendanon was part of the England Saxons victory of the 2010 Churchill Cup and his impressive performances resulted in him being named Player of the Tournament.

Entering the 2010–11 season Abendanon continued his good form. Although he lost his place for a month to Jack Cuthbert due to a niggling injury which limited him to impact appearances of the bench, Abendanon was promoted to the England Elite squad as replacement for the banned Delon Armitage. This promotion put him in contention to feature during the 2011 Six Nations which some pundits believed he deserved for his improvement over the previous year.

After eight years with Bath, on 3 February 2014, Abendanon signed for French giants Clermont Auvergne, playing in the Top 14 from the 2014–15 season. On 12 June 2020, Abendanon joined Pro D2 outfit Vannes on a two-year deal from the 2020–21 season.

== Retirement ==
Abendanon confirmed his retirement from international rugby on 28 October 2021 via Instagram.
