= List of 2017–18 Top 14 transfers =

This is a list of player transfers involving Top 14 teams before or during the 2017–18 season. The list is of deals that are confirmed and are either from or to a rugby union team in the Top 14 during the 2016–17 season. On 20 May 2017, Oyonnax and Agen are promoted in to the Top 14 for the 2017–18 season, with Bayonne and Grenoble demoted to the Pro D2 It is not unknown for confirmed deals to be cancelled at a later date.

== Agen ==
=== Players In ===
- (France) Loris Tolot from (France) Montauban
- (Fiji) Vilikisa Salawa from (France) Mont-de-Marsan
- (France) Morgan Phelipponneau from (France) Vannes
- (Argentina) Facundo Bosch from (Argentina) Jaguares
- (Italy) Leandro Cedaro from (France) La Rochelle
- (France) Mickael de Marco from (France) Oyonnax
- (France) Vincent Farre from (France) Albi
- (France) Lucas Rubio from (France) Narbonne
- (Argentina) Ignacio Mieres from (France) Dax
- (France) Yoan Tanga from (France) Castres
- (Georgia (country)) Gagi Bazadze from (France) Montpellier
- (South Africa) Ricky Januarie from (France) La Rochelle
- (France) Nicholas Metge from (France) Oyonnax
- (France) Loick Jammes from (France) Grenoble
- (Tonga) Paul Ngauamo from (France) Mont-de-Marsan
- (Fiji) Akapusi Qera from (France) Montpellier
- (New Zealand) Sam Vaka from (New Zealand) Counties Manukau
- (Australia) Jake McIntyre from (Australia) Queensland Reds
- (Tonga) Opeti Fonua from (England) Newcastle Falcons

=== Players Out ===
- (Canada) Taylor Paris to (France) Castres
- (Portugal) Mike Tadjer to (France) Brive
- (France) Nathan Decron to (France) Bordeaux
- (France) Florian Dufour to (France) Bordeaux
- (France) William Demotte to (France) La Rochelle
- (South Africa) Burton Francis to (France) Grenoble
- (France) Remi Vaquin retired
- (France) Francois Bouvier to (France) Carcassonne
- (New Zealand) Dan Hollinshead to (Japan) Coca-Cola West Red Sparks
- (France) Clement Darbo to (France) Montauban
- (Tonga) Sione Tau to (France) Perpignan
- (France) Francois Tardieu to (France) Colomiers
- (France) Arsene N'Nomo to (France) Marmande
- (France) Marc Baget to (France) Orthez

== Bordeaux ==
=== Players In ===
- (Fiji) Apisai Naqavelu from (France) Dax
- (France) Adrien Pélissié from (France) Aurillac
- (France) Nathan Decron from (France) Agen
- (France) Florian Dufour from (France) Agen
- (France) Alexandre Roumat from (France) Biarritz
- (France) Cameron Woki from (France) Massy
- (South Africa) Tian Schoeman from (South Africa) Bulls
- (France) Adrien Vigne from (France) Béziers
- (Fiji) Peni Ravai from (France) Aurillac
- (France) Mahamadou Diaby from (France) Grenoble
- (France) Pierre Gayraud from (France) Bayonne
- (Australia) Leroy Houston from (Australia) Queensland Reds
- (New Zealand) Fa'asiu Fuatai from (New Zealand) Otago
- Jean-Pascal Barraque from France Sevens
- (Fiji) Ben Volavola from (Australia) Melbourne Rebels
- (Samoa) Ed Fidow from (Australia) Queensland Country

=== Players Out ===
- (France) Ronan Chambord to (France) Biarritz
- (France) Jean-Marcelin Buttin to (France) Lyon
- (France) Louis-Benoit Madaule to (France) Toulouse
- (France) Jean-Baptiste Poux retired
- (France) Lionel Beauxis to (France) Lyon
- (Fiji) Joe Vakacegu to (France) Biarritz
- (France) Julien Audy to (France) Oyonnax
- (Australia) Adam Ashley-Cooper to (Japan) Kobelco Steelers
- (South Africa) Berend Botha to (France) Perpignan
- (Ireland) Ian Madigan to (England) Bristol
- (South Africa) Steven Kitshoff to (South Africa) Stormers
- (New Zealand) Peter Saili to (France) Pau
- (New Zealand) Joe Edwards to (France) Provence
- (Spain) Benat Auzqui to (France) Grenoble

== Brive ==
=== Players In ===
- (France) Etienne Harjean from (France) Narbonne
- (France) Damien Lagrange from (France) La Rochelle
- (France) Franck Romanet from (France) Lyon
- (Portugal) Mike Tadjer from (France) Agen
- (Portugal) Samuel Marques from (France) Toulouse
- (France) Florian Cazenave from (Italy) Rugby Reggio
- (Tonga) Sila Puafisi from (Scotland) Glasgow Warriors
- (Samoa) James Johnston from (England) Worcester Warriors
- (France) Felix Le Bourhis from (France) Bayonne
- (Samoa) Na'ama Leleimalefaga from (England) Worcester Warriors
- (France) Julien Brugnaut from (France) Racing 92

=== Players Out ===
- (France) Jean-Baptiste Pejoine retired
- (France) Arnaud Mela retired
- (France) Teddy Iribaren to (France) Racing 92
- (France) Guillaume Ribes retired
- (France) Lucas Pointud to (France) Toulouse
- (Australia) Chris Tuatara-Morrison to (France) Colomiers
- (France) Romain Cabannes to (France) Mont-de-Marsan
- (Samoa) Patrick Toetu to (France) Albi
- (New Zealand) William Whetton to (France) Albi
- (France) Damien Lavergne to (France) Soyaux Angoulême
- (South Africa) Kevin Buys to (France) Oyonnax
- (Fiji) Malakai Radikedike to (France) Bourgoin

== Castres ==
=== Players In ===
- (Canada) Taylor Paris from (France) Agen
- (France) Ludovic Radosavljevic from (France) Clermont Auvergne
- (France) Armand Batlle from (France) Grenoble
- (France) Yohan Le Bourhis from (France) Biarritz
- (France) Kevin Firmin from (France) Dax
- (France) Yohan Domenech from (France) Carcassonne

=== Players Out ===
- (France) Remy Grosso to (France) Clermont Auvergne
- (France) Antoine Dupont to (France) Toulouse
- (France) Brice Mach to (France) Perpignan
- (France) Julien Seron to (France) Carcassonne
- (France) Francois Fontaine to (France) Colomiers
- (Argentina) Horacio Agulla to (Argentina) Hindu Club
- (France) Yoan Tanga to (France) Agen
- (France) Julien Grolleau to (France) Lavaur

== Clermont ==
=== Players In ===
- (Scotland) Greig Laidlaw from (England) Gloucester
- (France) Remy Grosso from (France) Castres
- (Tonga) Loni Uhila from (New Zealand) Hurricanes
- (France) Rabah Slimani from (France) Stade Français
- (Australia) Peter Betham from (England) Leicester Tigers

=== Players Out ===
- (France) Clement Ric to (France) Lyon
- (France) Thomas Domingo to (France) Pau
- (Portugal) Julien Bardy to (France) Montpellier
- (France) Ludovic Radosavljevic to (France) Castres
- (France) Enzo Sanga to (France) Montpellier
- (France) Vincent Debaty to (France) Oyonnax
- (New Zealand) Benson Stanley to (France) Pau
- (France) Pierre Rude to (France) Aurillac
- (France) Adrien Plante to (France) Pau

== La Rochelle ==
=== Players In ===
- (France) Geoffrey Doumayrou from (France) Stade Français
- (France) Jeremy Sinzelle from (France) Stade Français
- (France) Jean-Charles Orioli from (France) Toulon
- (France) Gregory Lamboley from (France) Toulouse
- (France) William Demotte from (France) Agen
- (France) Thomas Jolmes from (France) Grenoble
- (France) Greg Alldritt from (France) Auch
- (France) Pierre Bourgarit from (France) Auch
- (New Zealand) Tawera Kerr-Barlow from (New Zealand) Chiefs
- (England) Ryan Lamb from (England) Worcester Warriors
- (New Zealand) Rene Ranger from (New Zealand) Blues

=== Players Out ===
- (France) Damien Lagrange to (France) Brive
- (Australia) Zack Holmes to (France) Toulouse
- (Italy) Leandro Cedaro to (France) Agen
- (France) Anthony Fuertes to (France) Oyonnax
- (France) Pierre Popelin to (France) Carcassonne
- (France) Jordan Seneca to (France) Nevers
- (France) Jules Le Bail to (France) Vannes
- (France) Charles Lagarde to (France) Vannes
- Piere Popelin to France Sevens
- (South Africa) Ricky Januarie to (France) Agen
- (Fiji) Savenaca Rawaca to (France) Bayonne
- (France) Maxime Gau to (France) Stade Français
- (New Zealand) David Raikuna to (France) Strasbourg

== Lyon ==
=== Players In ===
- (France) Jean-Marcelin Buttin from (France) Bordeaux
- (France) Virgile Lacombe from (France) Racing 92
- (France) Theophile Cotte from (France) Bourgoin
- (France) Clement Ric from (France) Clermont Auvergne
- (Italy) Piero Dominguez from (New Zealand) Pakuranga
- (France) Lionel Beauxis from (France) Bordeaux
- (France) Xavier Mignot from (France) Grenoble
- (France) Maxime Granouillet from (France) Aurillac
- (South Africa) Francois van der Merwe from (France) Racing 92
- (South Africa) Etienne Oosthuizen from (South Africa) Sharks
- (France) Richard Choirat from (France) Bayonne
- (France) Jonathan Pelissie from (France) Toulon
- (South Africa) Hendrik Roodt from (France) Grenoble
- (Fiji) Timilai Rokoduru from (France) Albi
- (France) Alexis Palisson from (France) Toulouse
- (Australia) Liam Gill from (France) Toulon

=== Players Out ===
- (France) Thibaut Privat retired
- (France) Julien Bonnaire retired
- (France) Franck Romanet to (France) Brive
- (South Africa) Jacques-Louis Potgieter to (France) Perpignan
- (France) Nisie Huyard to (France) Mont-de-Marsan
- (Samoa) Maselino Paulino to (France) Narbonne
- (France) Sami Mavinga to (England) Newcastle Falcons
- (France) Romain Loursac retired
- (France) Guillaume Galletier to (France) Montpellier
- (France) Nicolas Durand retired
- (France) Dider Tison to (France) Carcassonne
- (Cameroon) Cameron Njewel to (France) Oyonnax
- (Australia) Curtis Browning to (France) Oyonnax
- (Samoa) Ti'i Paulo to (New Zealand) Tasman
- (Georgia (country)) Zaza Navrozashvili to (France) Albi
- Paul Bonneford to France Sevens
- (Fiji) Napolioni Nalaga to (England) London Irish
- (South Africa) BJ Botha to (France) Biarritz

== Montpellier ==
=== Players In ===
- (France) Yacouba Camara from (France) Toulouse
- (Portugal) Julien Bardy from (France) Clermont Auvergne
- (France) Enzo Sanga from (France) Clermont Auvergne
- (New Zealand) Aaron Cruden from (New Zealand) Chiefs
- (France) Kevin Kornath from (France) Grenoble
- (France) Guillaume Galletier from (France) Lyon
- (South Africa) Jan Serfontein from (South Africa) Bulls
- (France) Louis Picamoles from (England) Northampton Saints
- (South Africa) Ruan Pienaar from (Ireland) Ulster
- (Georgia (country)) Levan Chilachava from (France) Toulon

=== Players Out ===
- (South Africa) Demetri Catrakilis to (England) Harlequins
- (France) Mickael Romera to (France) Oyonnax
- (Australia) Nic White to (England) Exeter Chiefs
- (South Africa) Duhan van der Merwe to (Scotland) Edinburgh
- (New Zealand) Ben Botica to (France) Oyonnax
- (South Africa) Cameron Wright to (South Africa) Sharks
- (Georgia (country)) Gagi Bazadze to (France) Agen
- (Fiji) Akapusi Qera to (France) Agen
- (South Africa) Pierre Spies retired
- (France) Marvin O'Connor to (France) Stade Français
- (Cameroon) Robins Tchale-Watchou retired
- (Ireland) Tomás O'Leary retired
- (France) Julien Malzieu retired
- (France) Antoine Battut released
- (Georgia (country)) Davit Kubriashvili to (France) Grenoble

== Oyonnax ==
=== Players In ===
- (France) Julien Audy from (France) Bordeaux
- (France) Tim Giresse from (France) Biarritz
- (France) Vincent Debaty from (France) Clermont Auvergne
- (Australia) Phoenix Battye from (France) Béziers
- (France) Mickael Romera from (France) Montpellier
- (France) Anthony Fuertes from (France) La Rochelle
- (England) Matt Hopper from (England) Harlequins
- (Cameroon) Cameron Njewel from (France) Lyon
- (Australia) Curtis Browning from (France) Lyon
- (Italy) Pietro Ceccarelli from (Italy) Zebre
- (New Zealand) Hika Elliot from (New Zealand) Chiefs
- (New Zealand) Ben Botica from (France) Montpellier
- (New Zealand) Rory Grice from (France) Grenoble
- (France) Khatchik Vartanov from (France) Racing 92
- (South Africa) Kevin Buys from (France) Brive
- (Australia) Mitch Inman from (Australia) Melbourne Rebels

=== Players Out ===
- (France) Fabien Cibray to (France) Provence
- (France) Mickael de Marco to (France) Agen
- (Fiji) Uwa Tawalo to (France) Biarritz
- (New Zealand) Nuku Swirling to (France) Grenoble
- (Canada) Jamie Cudmore retired
- (France) Thomas Bordes to (France) Massy
- (France) Pascal Cotet to (France) Aubenas
- (France) Arthur Aziza to (France) Narbonne
- (France) Keziah Giordano to (France) Provence
- (France) Nicholas Metge to (France) Agen
- (Tonga) Alaska Taufa to (France) Grenoble
- (France) Killian Marie to (France) Limoges
- (France) Lucas Chouvet to (France) Valence Romans Drome
- (Tonga) Fetuʻu Vainikolo to (France) Valence Romans Drome
- (Czech Republic) Lukas Rapant to (France) Bellegarde
- (Ireland) Eamonn Sheridan to (France) Carcassonne

== Pau ==
=== Players In ===
- (France) Thomas Domingo from (France) Clermont Auvergne
- (France) Martin Puech from (France) Colomiers
- (France) Laurent Bouchet from (France) Grenoble
- (France) Florian Nicot from (France) Colomiers
- (New Zealand) Benson Stanley from (France) Clermont Auvergne
- (New Zealand) Frank Halai from (England) Wasps
- (Ireland) Dave Foley from (Ireland) Munster
- (New Zealand) Peter Saili from (France) Bordeaux
- (South Africa) Lourens Adriaanse from (South Africa) Sharks
- (France) Adrien Plante from (France) Clermont Auvergne

=== Players Out ===
- (France) Mehdi Boundjema to (France) Narbonne
- (France) Louis Dupichot to (France) Racing 92
- (France) Julien Jacquot to (France) Morlaas
- (Ireland) James Coughlan retired
- (Argentina) Santiago Fernandez to (Argentina) Hindu Club
- (Fiji) Mosese Ratuvou to (France) Chambéry
- (France) Ibrahim Diarra to (France) Lavaur
- (France) Loïc Bernad to (France) Tarbes

== Racing 92 ==
=== Players In ===
- (France) Teddy Iribaren from (France) Brive
- (Samoa) Census Johnston from (France) Toulouse
- (Georgia (country)) Vasil Kakovin from (France) Toulouse
- (France) Louis Dupichot from (France) Pau
- (Ireland) Donnacha Ryan from (Ireland) Munster
- (France) Baptiste Chouzenoux from (France) Bayonne
- Virimi Vakatawa from France Sevens
- (Argentina) Patricio Albacete from (France) Toulouse
- (Tonga) Edwin Maka from (France) Toulouse
- (South Africa) Pat Lambie from (South Africa) Sharks

=== Players Out ===
- (France) Virgile Lacombe to (France) Lyon
- (France) Pierre Maiau to (France) Grenoble
- (France) Étienne Dussartre to (France) Grenoble
- (Ireland) James Hart to (Ireland) Munster
- (France) Loïc Godener to (France) Grenoble
- (France) Mathieu Loree to (France) Mont-de-Marsan
- (France) Thibault Dubarry to (France) Biarritz
- (France) Julien Brugnaut to (France) Brive
- (South Africa) Francois van der Merwe to (France) Lyon
- (New Zealand) Chris Masoe retired
- (South Africa) Sean Robinson to (France) Bayonne
- (France) Khatchik Vartanov to (France) Oyonnax
- (South Africa) Gerbrandt Grobler to (Ireland) Munster

== Stade Français ==
=== Players In ===
- (France) Jimmy Yobo from (France) Toulon
- (Ivory Coast) Bakery Meite from (France) Béziers
- (South Africa) Charl McLeod from (France) Grenoble
- Terry Bouhraoua from France Sevens
- (France) Marvin O'Connor from (France) Montpellier
- (France) Romain Martial from (France) Bayonne
- (Italy) Lorenzo Cittadini from (France) Bayonne
- (New Zealand) Tony Ensor from (New Zealand) Otago
- (Argentina) Ramiro Herrera from (Argentina) Jaguares
- (France) Maxime Gau from (France) La Rochelle
- (South Africa) Corne Fourie from (South Africa) Lions
- (England) Shane Geraghty from (England) Bristol
- (South Africa) Gurthro Steenkamp from (France) Toulouse

=== Players Out ===
- (France) Pascal Papé retired
- (France) Raphaël Lakafia to (France) Toulon
- (France) Geoffrey Doumayrou to (France) La Rochelle
- (France) Hugo Bonneval to (France) Toulon
- (France) Jeremy Sinzelle to (France) La Rochelle
- (France) Rabah Slimani to (France) Clermont Auvergne
- (South Africa) Jono Ross to (England) Sale Sharks
- (France) Julien Dupuy retired
- (Australia) Will Genia to (Australia) Melbourne Rebels
- (South Africa) Entienne Swanepoel to (South Africa) Southern Kings
- (Georgia (country)) Zurab Zhvanial to (England) Wasps

== Toulon ==
=== Players In ===
- (England) Chris Ashton from (England) Saracens
- (France) Raphaël Lakafia from (France) Stade Français
- (France) Hugo Bonneval from (France) Stade Français
- (Fiji) Semi Radradra from (Australia) Parramatta Eels
- (France) Jonathan Wisniewski from (France) Grenoble
- (Argentina) Facundo Isa from (Argentina) Jaguares
- (New Zealand) Luke McAlister from (France) Toulouse
- (France) Jean Monribot from (France) Bayonne
- (South Africa) JP Pietersen from (England) Leicester Tigers
- (Italy) Edoardo Padovani from (Italy) Zebre
- (Australia) Jonah Placid from (Australia) Melbourne Rebels
- (New Zealand) Malakai Fekitoa from (New Zealand) Highlanders
- (New Zealand) Alby Mathewson from (England) Bristol

=== Players Out ===
- (France) Jean-Charles Orioli to (France) La Rochelle
- (France) Jimmy Yobo to (France) Stade Français
- (France) Maxime Mermoz to (England) Newcastle Falcons
- (France) Teiva Jacquelain to (France) Grenoble
- (Australia) Drew Mitchell retired
- (France) Jonathan Pelissie to (France) Lyon
- (Australia) Matt Giteau to (Japan) Suntory Sungoliath
- (Australia) Ben Barba to (England) St Helens
- (France) Pierre Bernard to (France) Biarritz
- (Fiji) Manasa Saulo to (England) London Irish
- (South Africa) Juan Smith to (Japan) Toyota Verblitz
- (Japan) Ayumu Goromaru to (Japan) Yamaha Júbilo
- (South Africa) Aidon Davis to (France) Bayonne
- (Australia) James O'Connor to (England) Sale Sharks
- (Australia) Liam Gill to (France) Lyon
- (Georgia (country)) Shalva Mamukashvili to (France) Carcassonne
- (Wales) Leigh Halfpenny to (Wales) Scarlets
- (Georgia (country)) Levan Chilachava to (France) Montpellier

== Toulouse ==
=== Players In ===
- (France) Louis-Benoit Madaule from (France) Bordeaux
- (France) Antoine Dupont from (France) Castres
- (Australia) Zack Holmes from (France) La Rochelle
- (New Zealand) Charlie Faumuina from (New Zealand) Blues
- (France) Lucas Pointud from (France) Brive
- (South Africa) Cheslin Kolbe from (South Africa) Stormers
- (France) Baptiste Mouchous from (France) Tarbes
- (South Africa) Danie Mienie from (South Africa) Cheetahs
- (South Africa) Wandile Mjekevu from (South Africa) Southern Kings

=== Players Out ===
- (France) Christopher Tolofua to (England) Saracens
- (France) Yacouba Camara to (France) Montpellier
- (Samoa) Census Johnston to (France) Racing 92
- (Portugal) Samuel Marques to (France) Brive
- (Georgia (country)) Vasil Kakovin to (France) Racing 92
- (France) Gregory Lamboley to (France) La Rochelle
- (France) Thierry Dusautoir retired
- (New Zealand) Luke McAlister to (France) Toulon
- (England) Toby Flood to (England) Newcastle Falcons
- (France) Alexis Palisson to (France) Lyon
- (Argentina) Patricio Albacete to (France) Racing 92
- (Tonga) Edwin Maka to (France) Racing 92
- (South Africa) Gurthro Steenkamp to (France) Stade Français

== See also ==
- List of 2017–18 Premiership Rugby transfers
- List of 2017–18 Pro14 transfers
- List of 2017–18 Super Rugby transfers
- List of 2017–18 RFU Championship transfers
