= List of 2020–21 Top 14 transfers =

Around 300 players from the Top 14 French rugby union league transferred before or during the 2020–21 season. The transfers listed below are confirmed and are either from or to a rugby union team during the previous 2019-20 season.

== Agen ==
=== Players in ===
- (France) Jean-Marcellin Buttin from (France) Lyon
- (France) Tapu Falatea from (France) Castres
- (France) Nathan Decron promoted from Academy
- (France) Corentin Vernet from (France) Toulon
- (France) Camille Gerondeau from (France) Castres
- (France) Victor Moreaux from (France) Castres
- (France) Kevin Yaméogo from (France) Lyon (season-long loan)
- (Fiji) Tevita Railevu from (France) La Rochelle
- (France) Yoan Cottin from (France) Toulon (season-long loan)
- (Ireland) Noel Reid from (England) Leicester Tigers
- (England) Gabriel Ibitoye from (England) Harlequins
- (Samoa) Paterika Vaivai from (France) Toulouse Olympique

=== Players out ===
- (Spain) Mickaël De Marco retired
- (France) Alban Conduche to (France) Dijon
- (France) Leo Berdeu returned to (France) Lyon
- (Australia) Tom Murday to (Japan) Toyota Industries Shuttles
- (France) Kamliele Tufele to (France) Montauban
- (Fiji) Benito Masilevu to (France) Grenoble
- (Argentina) Jeronimo Negrotto to (France) Nice
- (France) Xavier Chauveau retired
- (Romania) Adrian Motoc to (France) Massy
- (England) Gabriel Ibitoye to (France) Montpellier
- (Tonga) Paul Ngauamo to (France) Castres

== Bayonne ==
=== Players in ===
- (Spain) Asier Usarraga from (France) Biarritz
- (France) Gaëtan Germain from (France) Grenoble
- Joe Ravouvou from New Zealand Sevens
- (England) Sam Nixon from (England) Bath
- (Australia) John Ulugia from (France) Clermont
- (Australia) Hugh Pyle from (France) Stade Français Paris
- (Australia) Izaia Perese from (Australia) Brisbane Broncos
- (France) Alexandre Manukula from (France) Toulouse (season-long loan)
- (Georgia (country)) Konstantin Mikautadze from (France) Montpellier
- (Samoa) Afa Amosa from (France) Bordeaux

=== Players out ===
- (Chile) Jose Ramon Ayerza to (France) Montauban
- (England) Callum Wilson to (France) Biarritz
- (Ivory Coast) Evrard Oulai Dion to (France) Montauban
- (France) Maxime Lamothe returned to (France) Bordeaux
- (France) Antoine Battut retired
- (France) Julien Tisseron to (France) Montpellier
- (Tonga) Maile Mamao to (Italy) Rovigo
- (Samoa) Census Johnston retired
- (France) Aretz Iguiniz retired
- (France) Benjamin Collet to (France) Valence Romans
- (France) Emmanuel Saubusse to (France) Mont-de-Marsan
- (Namibia) P. J. van Lill to (France) Valence Romans
- (France) Adam Jaulhac released
- (South Africa) Armandt Koster released
- (Tonga) Edwin Maka released

== Bordeaux ==
=== Players in ===
- (South Africa) Joseph Dweba from (South Africa) Cheetahs
- (New Zealand) Ben Lam from (New Zealand) Hurricanes
- (France) Nathaniel Hulleu from (France) Grenoble
- (Tonga) Ben Tameifuna from (France) Racing 92
- (France) Maxime Lamothe returned from (France) Bayonne
- (Argentina) Guido Petti from (Argentina) Jaguares
- (France) Pablo Uberti returned from (France) Grenoble
- (Argentina) Bautista Delguy from (Argentina) Jaguares

=== Players out ===
- (France) Adrien Pélissié to (France) Clermont
- (Fiji) Semi Radradra to (England) Bristol Bears
- (Fiji) Peni Ravai to (France) Clermont
- (France) Lucas Meret to (France) Carcassonne
- (France) Florian Dufour to (France) Brive
- (Australia) Blair Connor retired
- (New Zealand) Masalosalo Tutaia released
- (France) Nicolas Plazy to (France) Beziers
- (Fiji) Seta Tamanivalu to (Japan) Toshiba Brave Lupus
- (Australia) Afa Amosa to (France) Bayonne

== Brive ==
=== Players in ===
- (England) Wesley Douglas from (France) Beziers
- (France) Valentin Tirefort from (France) La Rochelle
- (Italy) Pietro Ceccarelli from (Scotland) Edinburgh
- (France) Florian Dufour from (France) Bordeaux
- (Fiji) Setariki Tuicuvu from (France) Clermont
- (Samoa) Brandon Nansen from (Wales) Dragons
- (England) Stan South from (England) Exeter Chiefs
- (Ireland) Daniel Brennan from (France) Montpellier season-long loan
- (Georgia (country)) Badri Alkhazashvili from (France) Lyon season-long loan
- (Argentina) Lucas Paulos from (Argentina) Jaguares

=== Players out ===
- (South Africa) Johan Snyman retired
- (France) François Da Ros to (France) Biarritz
- (Samoa) James Johnston to (France) Rouen
- (Scotland) Alex Dunbar released
- (France) Franck Romanet released
- (Ireland) Rory Scholes released
- (France) Richard Fourcade to (France) Le Seyne
- (France) Guillaume Namy to (France) Narbonne
- (Georgia (country)) Karlen Asieshvili to (France) Rouen
- (South Africa) Jan Uys to (South Africa) Bulls
- (France) Dan Malafosse released
- (France) Alban Ramette to (France) Aubenas

== Castres ==
=== Players in ===
- (Germany) Julius Nostadt from (France) Aurillac
- (France) Bastien Guillemin from (France) Grenoble
- (Uruguay) Santiago Arata from (Uruguay) Peñarol
- (Fiji) Adrea Cocagi from (France) Perpignan
- (France) Stéphane Onambélé from (France) Toulon
- (France) Gaëtan Barlot from (France) Colomiers
- (Canada) Tyler Ardron from (New Zealand) Chiefs
- (France) Kevin Kornath from (France) Montpellier
- Vilimoni Botitu from Fiji Sevens
- (South Africa) Ryno Pieterse from (South Africa) Bulls
- (France) Pierre Huguet from (France) Carcassonne
- (France) Florent Vanverberghe from (France) Toulon
- (Fiji) Osea Waqaninavatu from (Fiji) Fijian Drua
- (Australia) Tom Staniforth from (Australia) NSW Waratahs
- (Tonga) Paul Ngauamo from (France) Agen

=== Players out ===
- (France) Ludovic Radosavljevic to (France) Provence
- (New Zealand) Karena Wihongi retired
- (France) Tapu Falatea to (France) Agen
- (France) Christophe Samson retired
- (France) Kevin Gimeno to (France) Biarritz
- (Uruguay) Rodrigo Capo Ortega retired
- (France) Camille Gerondeau to (France) Agen
- (South Africa) Jody Jenneker to (France) Valence Romans
- (France) Morgan Phelipponneau to (France) Vannes
- (France) Victor Moreaux to (France) Agen
- (France) Julien Caminati to (France) Montauban
- (France) Paul Sauzaret to (France) Bourg-en-Bresse
- (France) Marc Clerc retired
- (Canada) Taylor Paris to (France) Oyonnax
- (Tonga) Paea Faʻanunu released
- (France) Benjamin Lapeyre released
- (New Zealand) Alex Tulou to (France) Lyon
- (South Africa) Robert Ebersohn to (France) Beziers
- (Fiji) Semi Kunatani released

== Clermont ==
=== Players in ===
- (France) Adrien Pélissié from (France) Bordeaux
- (Moldova) Cristian Ojovan from (France) Aurillac
- (France) Sébastien Bézy from (France) Toulouse
- (Fiji) Peni Ravai from (France) Bordeaux
- (France) Etienne Fourcade from (France) Grenoble
- (Japan) Kotaro Matsushima from (Japan) Suntory Sungoliath
- (France) Bastien Pourailly from (France) Pau
- Tavite Veredamu from France Sevens (medical joker)
- Jean-Pascal Barraque from France Sevens
- (England) Rory Jennings from (England) Coventry

=== Players out ===
- (France) Marc Palmier to (France) Aurillac
- (Georgia (country)) Davit Zirakashvili retired
- (France) Donovan Taofifenua to (France) Racing 92
- (Australia) John Ulugia to (France) Bayonne
- (France) Charlie Cassang to (France) Oyonnax
- (Portugal) Mike Tadjer to (France) Montauban
- (Georgia (country)) Beka Kakabadze to (France) Oyonnax
- (France) Julien Ruaud to (France) Grenoble
- (France) Remy Grosso to (France) Lyon
- (Fiji) Setariki Tuicuvu to (France) Brive
- (New Zealand) Isaia Toeava to (France) Toulon
- (Scotland) Greig Laidlaw to (Japan) NTT Communications Shining Arcs
- (England) Nick Abendanon to (France) Vannes
- (Tonga) Loni Uhila to (France) La Rochelle
- (England) George Merrick to (England) Worcester Warriors
- (Australia) Jake McIntyre to (Australia) Western Force
- (Australia) Sitaleki Timani to (Australia) Western Force

== La Rochelle ==
=== Players in ===
- (France) Brice Dulin from (France) Racing 92
- (South Africa) Raymond Rhule from (France) Grenoble
- (France) Jules Le Bail from (France) Vannes
- (South Africa) Dillyn Leyds from (South Africa) Stormers
- (Australia) Will Skelton from (England) Saracens
- (Tonga) Loni Uhila from (France) Clermont
- (Ireland) Darren Sweetnam from (Ireland) Munster (short-term deal)
- (South Africa) Marcel van der Merwe from (South Africa) Bulls (short-term deal)

=== Players out ===
- (France) Vincent Rattez to (France) Montpellier
- (France) Elliott Roudil to (France) Pau
- (France) Maxime Lafage to (France) Bayonne
- (France) Valentin Tirefort to (France) Brive
- (Australia) Brock James retired
- (France) Alexi Balès to (France) Toulouse
- (France) Thomas Jolmes to (France) Toulon
- (France) Marc Andreu to (France) La Seyne
- (France) Brieuc Plessis-Couillard to (France) Biarritz
- (Fiji) Jone Qovu to (France) Niort
- (Fiji) Tevita Railevu to (France) Agen
- (France) Mike Corbel to (France) Provence
- (Tonga) Sila Puafisi released
- (Fiji) Kini Murimurivalu to (England) Leicester Tigers
- (France) Jean-Charles Orioli to (France) Grenoble

== Lyon ==
=== Players in ===
- (Australia) Colby Fainga'a from (Ireland) Connacht
- (United States) Joe Taufete'e from (England) Worcester Warriors
- (France) Leo Berdeu returned from (France) Agen
- (France) Mathieu Bastareaud from (United States) Rugby United New York
- (France) Remy Grosso from (France) Clermont
- (France) Gillian Galan from (France) Toulouse
- (Australia) Izack Rodda from (Australia) Queensland Reds
- (New Zealand) Alex Tulou from (France) Castres
- (Fiji) Temo Mayanavanua from (New Zealand) Northland (season-long loan)
- (New Zealand) Jordan Taufua from (England) Leicester Tigers

=== Players out ===
- (France) Julien Puricelli retired
- (France) Jean-Marcellin Buttin to (France) Agen
- (Scotland) Sam Hidalgo-Clyne to (England) Exeter Chiefs
- (Tonga) Tanginoa Halaifonua to (France) Grenoble
- (France) Martial Rolland to (France) Aurillac
- (Australia) Liam Gill to (Japan) NTT Communications Shining Arcs
- (England) Carl Fearns to (France) Rouen
- (South Africa) Hendrik Roodt retired
- (France) Kevin Yaméogo to (France) Agen (season-long loan)
- (France) Alexis Palisson to (France) Colomiers
- (Georgia (country)) Badri Alkhazashvili to (France) Brive (season-long loan)
- (Argentina) Patricio Fernández to (France) Perpignan

== Montpellier ==
=== Players in ===
- (France) Vincent Rattez from (France) La Rochelle
- (France) Florian Verhaeghe from (France) Toulouse
- (France) Julien Tisseron from (France) Bayonne
- (United States) Titi Lamositele from (England) Saracens
- (France) Enzo Forletta from (France) Perpignan
- (France) Alexandre Becognee from (France) Mont-de-Marsan
- (France) Mickaël Capelli from (France) Grenoble
- (England) Alex Lozowski from (England) Saracens (season-long loan)
- (South Africa) Cobus Reinach from (England) Northampton Saints
- (England) Gabriel Ibitoye from (France) Agen

=== Players out ===
- (Portugal) Julien Bardy retired
- (France) Ronan Chambord to (France) Langon
- (France) Pierre Tournebize to (France) Brive
- (Fiji) Timoci Nagusa to (France) Grenoble
- (France) Julien Le Devedec to (France) Provence
- (Fiji) Nemani Nadolo to (England) Leicester Tigers
- (South Africa) François Steyn to (South Africa) Cheetahs
- (France) Kevin Kornath to (France) Castres
- (Samoa) Kahn Fotuali'i retired
- (France) Enzo Sanga to (France) Valence Romans
- (France) Lucas de Conninick to (France) Provence
- (France) Valentin Seille to (France) Dijon
- (Georgia (country)) Konstantin Mikautadze to (France) Bayonne
- (France) Benjamin Fall to (France) Oyonnax
- (Ireland) Daniel Brennan to (France) Brive season-long loan

== Pau ==
=== Players in ===
- (France) Elliott Roudil from (France) La Rochelle
- Aminiasi Tuimaba from Fiji Sevens
- (Samoa) Tumua Manu from (New Zealand) Chiefs
- (Australia) Matt Philip from (Australia) Melbourne Rebels
- (Australia) Mike Harris from (Japan) Toshiba Brave Lupus
- (France) Hugo Bonneval from (France) Toulon
- (Australia) Steve Cummins from (Wales) Scarlets (medical joker)
- (South Africa) Maks van Dyk from (England) Exeter Chiefs (short-term deal)
- (South Africa) Elton Jantjies from (South Africa) Lions (short-term deal)

=== Players out ===
- (New Zealand) Benson Stanley to (France) Montauban
- Mathias Colombet to France Sevens
- (France) Bastien Pourailly to (France) Clermont
- (Fiji) Dominiko Waqaniburotu released
- (New Zealand) Colin Slade to (Japan) Mitsubishi Dynaboars
- (France) Pierre Nueno to (France) Narbonne
- (New Zealand) Ben Smith to (Japan) Kobelco Steelers
- (New Zealand) Tom Taylor to (Japan) Toshiba Brave Lupus
- (France) Marvin Lestremau to (France) Auch

== Racing 92 ==
=== Players in ===
- (France) Donovan Taofifenua from (France) Clermont
- (Australia) Kurtley Beale from (Australia) NSW Waratahs
- (Australia) Luke Jones from (Australia) Melbourne Rebels
- (Argentina) Emiliano Boffelli from (Argentina) Jaguares
- (France) Gaël Fickou from (France) Stade Français

=== Players out ===
- (Fiji) Johnny Dyer to (France) Biarritz
- (France) Brice Dulin to (France) La Rochelle
- (France) Issam Hamel to (France) Nevers
- (Georgia (country)) Vasil Kakovin to (France) Stade Français Paris
- (Fiji) Ben Volavola to (France) Perpignan
- (Tonga) Ben Tameifuna to (France) Bordeaux
- (Scotland) Ewan Johnson to (France) Vannes

== Stade Français ==
=== Players in ===
- (Georgia (country)) Vasil Kakovin from (France) Racing 92
- (Argentina) Marcos Kremer from (Argentina) Jaguares
- (South Africa) Gerbrandt Grobler from (England) Gloucester
- (Tonga) Telusa Veainu from (England) Leicester Tigers
- (South Africa) Dylan Smith from (South Africa) Lions

=== Players out ===
- (France) Julien Arias retired
- (France) Remi Bonfils retired
- (Australia) Hugh Pyle to (France) Bayonne
- (Spain) Thierry Futeu to (France) Carcassonne
- (Fiji) Joketani Koroi to (France) Nice
- (South Africa) Lionel Mapoe to (France) Nice
- (France) Alexis Palisson to (France) Colomiers
- (Tonga) Sione Anga'aellangi released
- (South Africa) Ruan Combrinck released
- (France) Clément Daguin released
- (France) Gaël Fickou to (France) Racing 92

== Toulon ==
=== Players in ===
- (France) Thomas Jolmes from (France) La Rochelle
- (France) Jeremy Boyadjis from (France) Rennes
- (New Zealand) Isaia Toeava from (France) Clermont
- (England) Harrison Obatoyinbo from (England) Ealing Trailfinders
- (New Zealand) Ma'a Nonu from (United States) San Diego Legion (season-long loan)
- (France) Adrien Warion from (France) Provence
- (England) Levi Douglas from (England) Wasps (short-term deal)

=== Players out ===
- (France) Stéphane Onambélé to (France) Castres
- (France) Corentin Vernet to (France) Agen
- (Georgia (country)) Mamuka Gorgodze retired
- (South Africa) Marcel van der Merwe to (South Africa) Bulls
- (France) Mathieu Smaili to (France) Mont-de-Marsan
- (New Zealand) Nehe Milner-Skudder to (New Zealand) Highlanders
- (France) Florent Vanverberghe to (France) Castres
- (France) Yoan Cottin to (France) Agen (season-long loan)
- (France) Makalea Foliaki to (France) Cognac
- (France) Hugo Bonneval to (France) Pau
- (New Zealand) Liam Messam to (New Zealand) Waikato
- (New Zealand) Julian Savea to (New Zealand) Hurricanes
- (New Zealand) Bryce Heem to (New Zealand) Blues

== Toulouse ==
=== Players in ===
- (France) Alexi Balès from (France) La Rochelle
- (Australia) Richie Arnold from (Japan) Yamaha Júbilo
- (France) Thibaud Flament from (England) Wasps
- (Argentina) Juan Cruz Mallía from (Argentina) Jaguares
- (Argentina) Santiago Chocobares from (Argentina) Jaguares XV

=== Players out ===
- (France) Sébastien Bézy to (France) Clermont
- (France) Florian Verhaeghe to (France) Montpellier
- (France) Théo Belan to (France) Provence
- (Scotland) Richie Gray to (Scotland) Glasgow Warriors
- (New Zealand) Carl Axtens to (France) Provence
- (France) Pierre Pagès to (France) Vannes
- (France) Gillian Galan to (France) Lyon
- (France) Alexandre Manukula to (France) Bayonne (season-long loan)
- (South Africa) Tristan Tedder to (France) Béziers (season-long loan)
- (France) Maxime Mermoz retired

== See also ==
- List of 2020–21 Premiership Rugby transfers
- List of 2020–21 Pro14 transfers
- List of 2020–21 Super Rugby transfers
- List of 2020–21 RFU Championship transfers
- List of 2020–21 Major League Rugby transfers
