= 2013 Heineken Cup final =

2013 Heineken Cup Final
- Event: 2012–13 Heineken Cup
Clermont	Toulon
(France)	(France)
15	16
- Date: 18 May 2013
- Venue: Aviva Stadium, Dublin
- Man of the Match: Mathieu Bastareaud (Toulon)
- Referee: Alain Rolland (Ireland)
- Attendance: 50,148

The 2013 Heineken Cup Final was the final match of the 2012–13 Heineken Cup, the 18th season of Europe's top club rugby union competition. The match was played on 18 May 2013 in the Aviva Stadium in Dublin, Ireland, kicking off at 5 pm (16:00 UTC). The all-French game was won by Toulon, defeating Clermont 16–15.

== Background ==
Under rules of the competition organiser, European Rugby Cup, the winner of the Heineken Cup receives an automatic entry into the following season's Heineken Cup, as does the winner of the Amlin Challenge Cup. If the Heineken Cup winner has already qualified through its domestic or regional league, the berth will normally pass to another team from its country; both Clermont and Toulon have qualified as the top two teams in the Top 14 home-and-away season. However, France is capped at seven Heineken Cup places (as is England).

The final 2013–14 Heineken Cup participant was determined by the result of the Challenge Cup Final held the previous day at the RDS Arena in Dublin. Leinster's victory over Stade Français meant that the Heineken Cup winner's berth would now pass to the seventh-placed team in Top 14, Perpignan.

== Route to final ==
On 6 April, Clermont defeated Montpellier 36–14 at the Stade Marcel-Michelin in the quarter-finals while Toulon defeated Leicester Tigers the following evening 21–15. On 27 April, in the semi-finals, Clermont won 16–10 against Munster at Stade de la Mosson while Toulon beat Saracens 24–12 at Twickenham the next day.

== Match ==
The European Champions Village was staged in Merrion Square and was a point for all travelling supporters to congregate before the match.

=== Summary ===
The final was an all-French clash between Clermont and Toulon. At half-time the score was 3–3, with Toulon's Jonny Wilkinson and Clermont's Morgan Parra scoring a penalty each. Early in the second half, Clermont scored two tries (Napolioni Nalaga and Brock James) taking the score to 15–6, but despite this, Delon Armitage's converted try resulted in a 16–15 win for Toulon. Delon later apologized for mocking Brock James on the way to scoring the winning try, after being criticized for being unprofessional.

=== Details ===
18 May 2013
17:00 IST

Clermont (France)	15–16	(France) Toulon
Try: Nalaga 42' m James 48' c Con: Parra (1/2); Pen: Parra (1/1) 3'	Report	Try: D. Armitage 64' c Con: Wilkinson (1/1); Pen: Wilkinson (3/3) 13', 45', 60'

Aviva Stadium, Dublin
Attendance: 50,148
Referee: Alain Rolland (IRFU)

Clermont	Toulon

FB	15	(Wales) Lee Byrne
RW	14	(New Zealand) Sitiveni Sivivatu
OC	13	(France) Aurélien Rougerie (c)	(substituted off) 68'
IC	12	(France) Wesley Fofana
LW	11	(Fiji) Napolioni Nalaga
FH	10	(Australia) Brock James	(substituted off) 73'
SH	9	(France) Morgan Parra	(substituted off) 71'
N8	8	(France) Damien Chouly
OF	7	(South Africa) Gerhard Vosloo	(substituted off) 68'
BF	6	(France) Julien Bonnaire
RL	5	(Scotland) Nathan Hines
LL	4	(Canada) Jamie Cudmore
TP	3	(Georgia (country)) Davit Zirakashvili	(substituted off) 73'
HK	2	(France) Benjamin Kayser	(substituted off) 66'
LP	1	(France) Thomas Domingo	(substituted off) 66'
Substitutions:
HK	16	(Samoa) Ti'i Paulo	(substituted on) 66'
PR	17	(France) Vincent Debaty	(substituted on) 66'
PR	18	(France) Clement Ric	(substituted on) 73'
LK	19	(France) Julien Pierre
FL	20	(Portugal) Julien Bardy	(substituted on) 68'
SH	21	(France) Ludovic Radosavljevic	(substituted on) 71'
FH	22	(France) David Skrela	(substituted on) 73'
CE	23	(New Zealand) Regan King	(substituted on) 68'
Coach:
(New Zealand) Vern Cotter

FB	15	(England) Delon Armitage
RW	14	(New Zealand) Rudi Wulf
OC	13	(France) Mathieu Bastareaud
IC	12	(Australia) Matt Giteau
LW	11	(France) Alexis Palisson
FH	10	(England) Jonny Wilkinson (c)
SH	9	(France) Sébastien Tillous-Borde	(substituted off) 50'
N8	8	(New Zealand) Chris Masoe	(substituted off) 69'
OF	7	(Argentina) Juan Martín Fernández Lobbe
BF	6	(South Africa) Danie Rossouw	(substituted off) 50'
RL	5	(England) Nick Kennedy
LL	4	(South Africa) Bakkies Botha	(substituted off) 69'
TP	3	(New Zealand) Carl Hayman	(substituted off) 76'
HK	2	(France) Sébastien Bruno	(substituted off) 50'
LP	1	(England) Andrew Sheridan	(substituted off) 61'
Substitutions:
HK	16	(France) Jean-Charles Orioli	(substituted on) 50'
PR	17	(Wales) Gethin Jenkins	(substituted on) 61'
PR	18	(Georgia (country)) Davit Kubriashvili	(substituted on) 76'
N8	19	(South Africa) Joe van Niekerk	(substituted on) 50'
FL	20	(England) Steffon Armitage	(substituted on) 69'
CE	21	(France) Maxime Mermoz
FH	22	(France) Frédéric Michalak	(substituted on) 50'
LK	23	(France) Jocelino Suta	(substituted on) 69'
Coach:
(France) Bernard Laporte

Touch judges:
(England) Wayne Barnes
(Ireland) George Clancy
Television match official:
(Ireland) Marshall Kilgore

== Reaction ==
Wilkinson, who had turned down a place on the British and Irish Lions side to focus on his club rugby, said that winning the Heineken Cup was "right up there with winning the World Cup". The following day, Wilkinson was named European Player of the Year following his performance in the Heineken Cup.

Toulon's victory also doubled, to six, the number of players to have won titles in the premier club competitions of both the Northern and Southern Hemispheres, respectively the Heineken Cup and Super Rugby. Bakkies Botha and Danie Rossouw had won the then-Super 14 title with the Bulls in 2007, 2009, and 2010, while Matt Giteau had won the title with the Brumbies in 2004 when the competition was known as Super 12. The previous three players to have claimed both titles were Rod Kafer, Doug Howlett, and Brad Thorn.
