= Stiff-arm fend =

Tactic

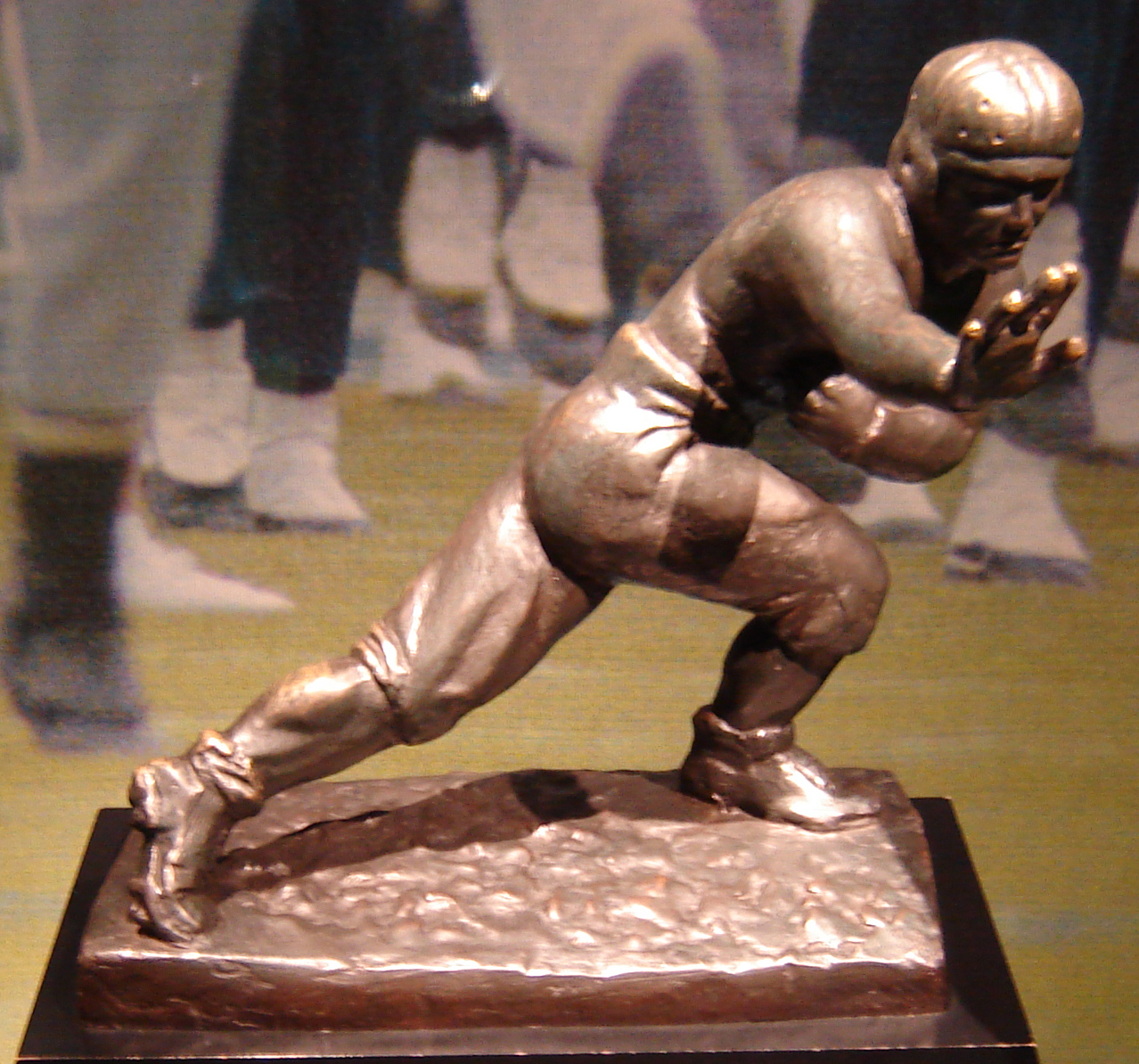
The Heisman Trophy in American college football shows a player anticipating delivering a stiff-arm fend.

The stiff-arm fend (also known as a hand off or fend off in rugby league and rugby union, sometimes as a don't argue in Australian rules football, or a stiff arm or straight arm in gridiron football) is a tactic employed by the ball-carrier in many forms of contact football.

== The skill ==
In rugby league, rugby union, American football and Australian football, ball-carriers run towards defenders who are attempting to tackle them. By positioning the ball securely in one arm, the ball-carrier can fully extend their other arm, locking their elbow, and outstretching their palm. Then, the ball-carrier pushes directly outwards with the palm of their hand onto the chest or shoulder of the would-be tackler. The fend is a pushing action, rather than a striking action.

A stiff-arm fend may cause the tackler to fall to the ground, taking them out of the play. Even if the tackler keeps their feet, it becomes impossible for them to complete a tackle, as they cannot come close enough to wrap their arms around the ball-carrier.

The term don't argue was coined in Australia to describe the stiff-arm fend. The term describes what a commentator imagined the ball-carrier might be saying as they shoved their opponent in the face or chest, and is used as a noun. Ball-carriers in Australian football must be careful to avoid fending opponents in the head or neck, otherwise they will concede a high tackle free kick. High fends will generally be allowed in rugby unless the referee rules that the fend is too forceful, constituting a strike rather than a push. In rugby, a stiff-arm tackle (i.e. locked elbow and extended arm prior to making contact with the attacker) is dangerous play. A player makes a stiff-arm tackle when using a stiff-arm to strike an opponent. Therefore, a stiff-arm fend, as described above is permitted (even a high fend) so long as it does not constitute striking the opponent (similar to an open-handed punch).

The stiff arm is also known as "pie in the face" in NFL slang.

=== Physics ===
The stiff-arm fend is particularly effective because its force is applied down the length of a straight arm, directly into the shoulder. This puts the arm bones exclusively under compressive axial stress, the stress to which bone is strongest, and ensures that minimal torque is applied to the shoulder joint. As such, the force that can be applied by a stiff-arm fend can easily repel or topple an oncoming defender. The same techniques are practised by some schools of martial artists when striking or punching; by ensuring that the direction of the force is directly down a locked, straight arm, martial artists can punch through bricks and tiles without damaging their arms.

== By code ==
=== Australian football ===
Australian football, unlike rugby football where the majority of tackles are gang tackles, has frequent opportunities for an effective fend-off (to the running player's advantage) in that ball carriers face one-on-one contests in open space. Unlike rugby football, if a player does not successfully fend off the tackler it can result in them losing possession of the ball through the holding the ball rule. Also the majority of tacklers in open space tend to chase and tackle from behind the ball carrier and strong front on contact is discouraged. In addition, high contact can result in a free kick against the player in possession so the Australian football fend requires additional precision to avoid contact to the face or neck, though in practice such incidental contact is not always penalised. Players typically push off the shoulder or chest of the opponent. There is no statistic for stiff-arm fends in Australian rules, however they are counted as broken tackles and are most commonly performed by mid-fielders and forwards. Historically backs would not risk their opponent getting a kick at goal from holding the ball but increasing forward pressure and professionalism has seen more players across the whole field become competent in the skill. Use of forearms and elbows can be dangerous and are usually penalised.

One of the first players noted to do this regularly in matches from the 1877 VFA season was superstar George Coulthard.

His speciality is, undoubtedly, running with the ball; many are the runs he has made, warding off his opponents with his long, muscular arms. This peculiar style of passing is really a treat to witness, and we may well say that Coulthard is unequalled at it, being a custom almost his own.

— The Australasian

Some of the best modern exponents of the don't argue include Dustin Martin, Harley Reid, Sam Powell-Pepper, Lance Franklin, Barry Hall, Fraser Gehrig, Michael Conlon, Jason Johnson, Nathan Jones, Ben Cunnington Gary Ablett Snr and Gary Ablett Jnr.

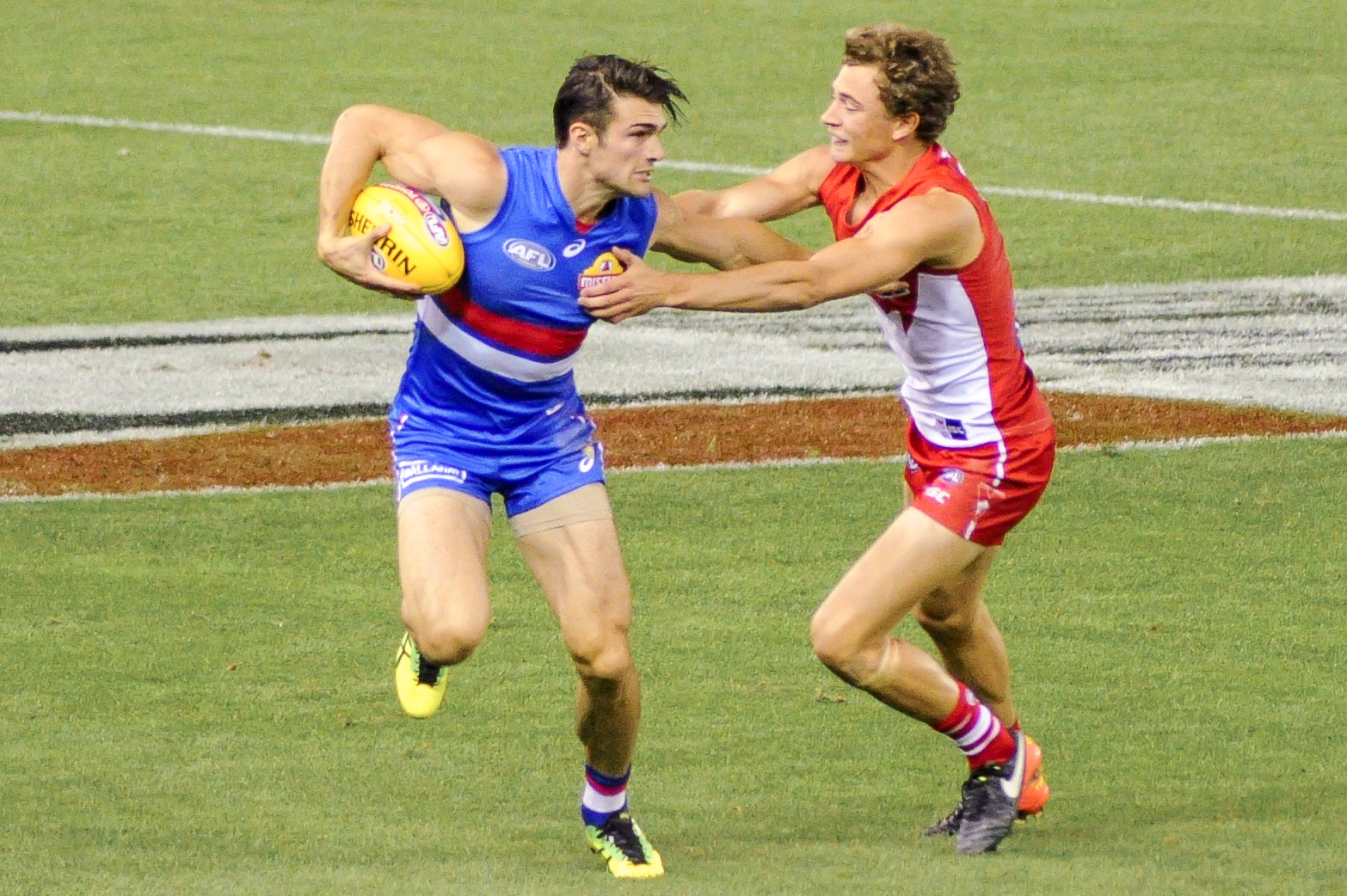
Easton Wood applies a fend to the chest of Will Hayward

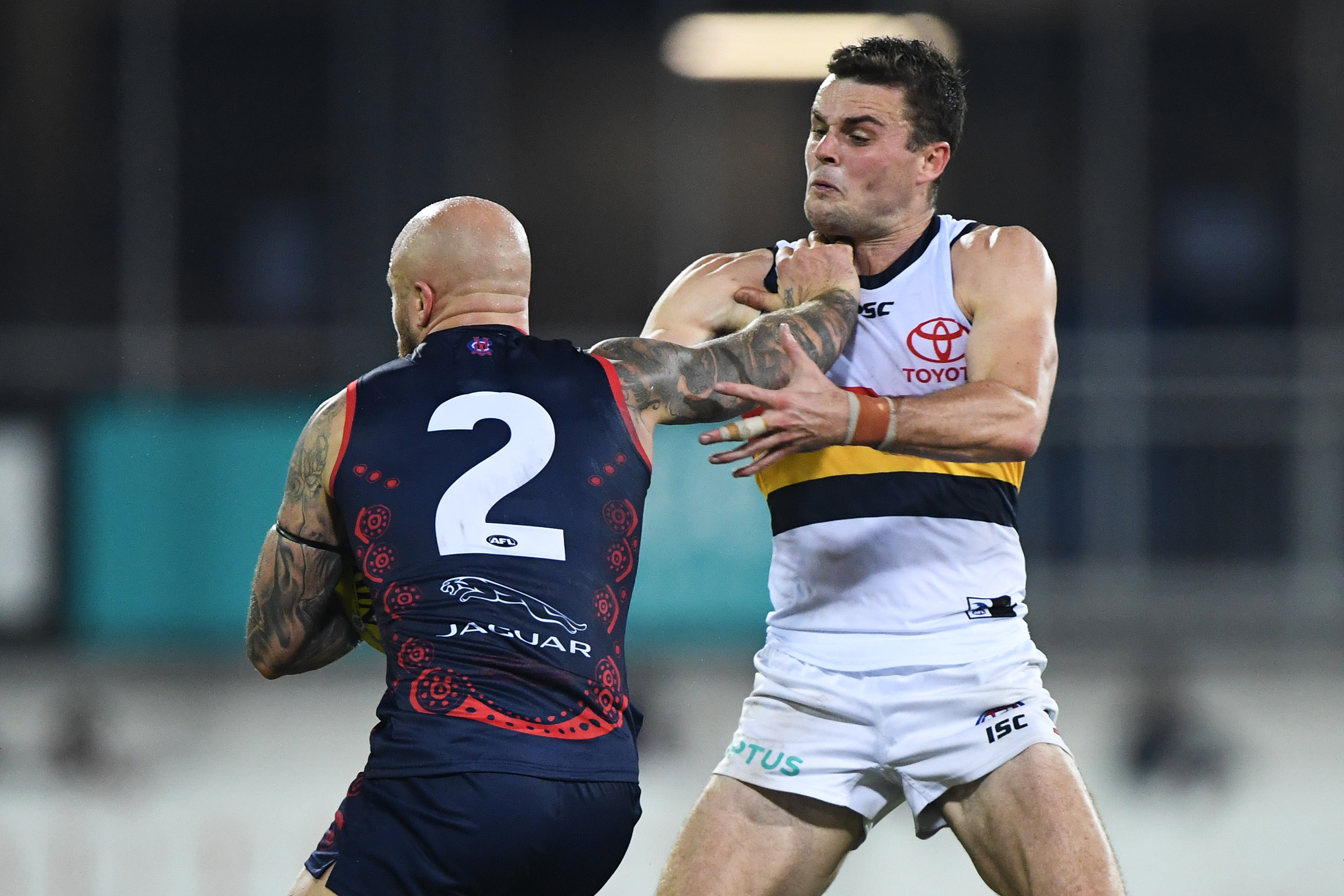
Nathan Jones applies a fend to the collar of Brad Crouch

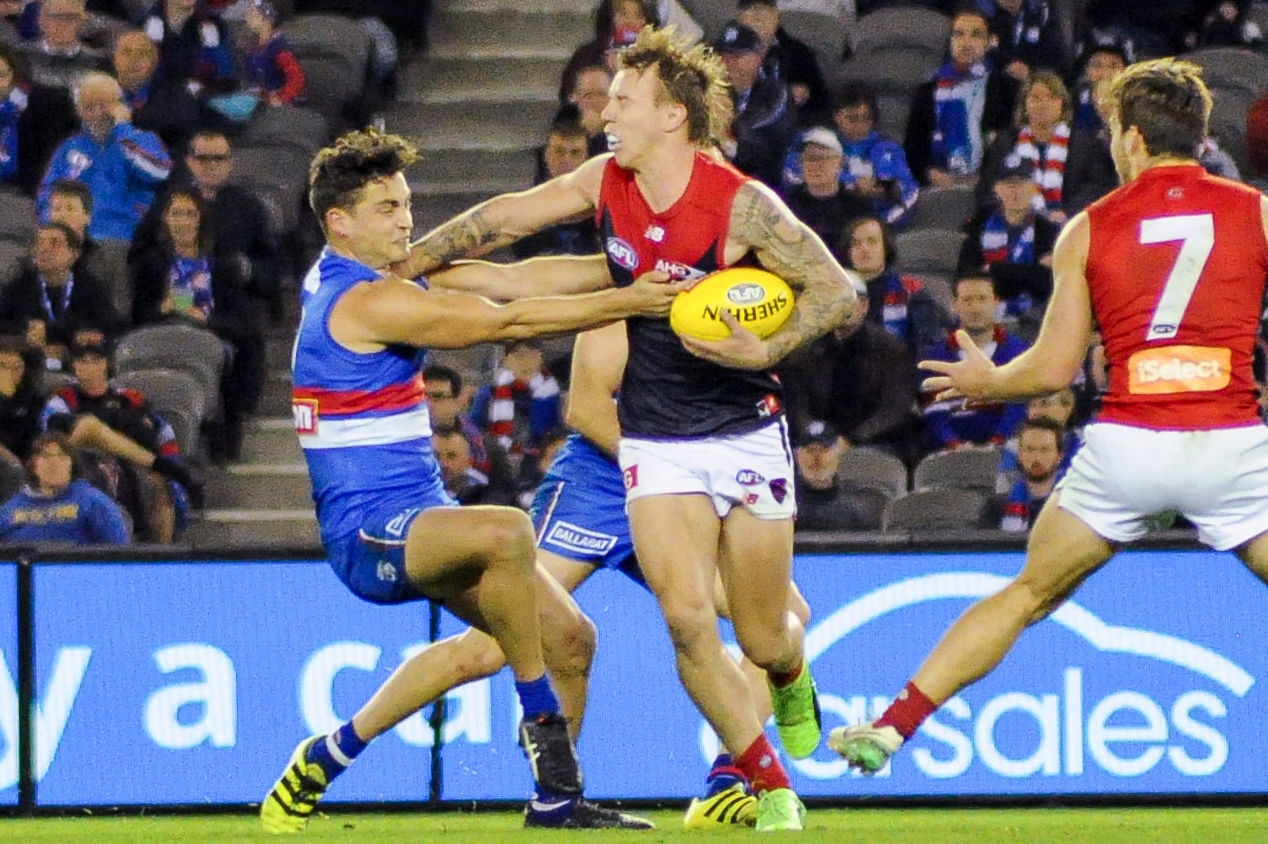
James Harmes fends off Luke Dahlhaus

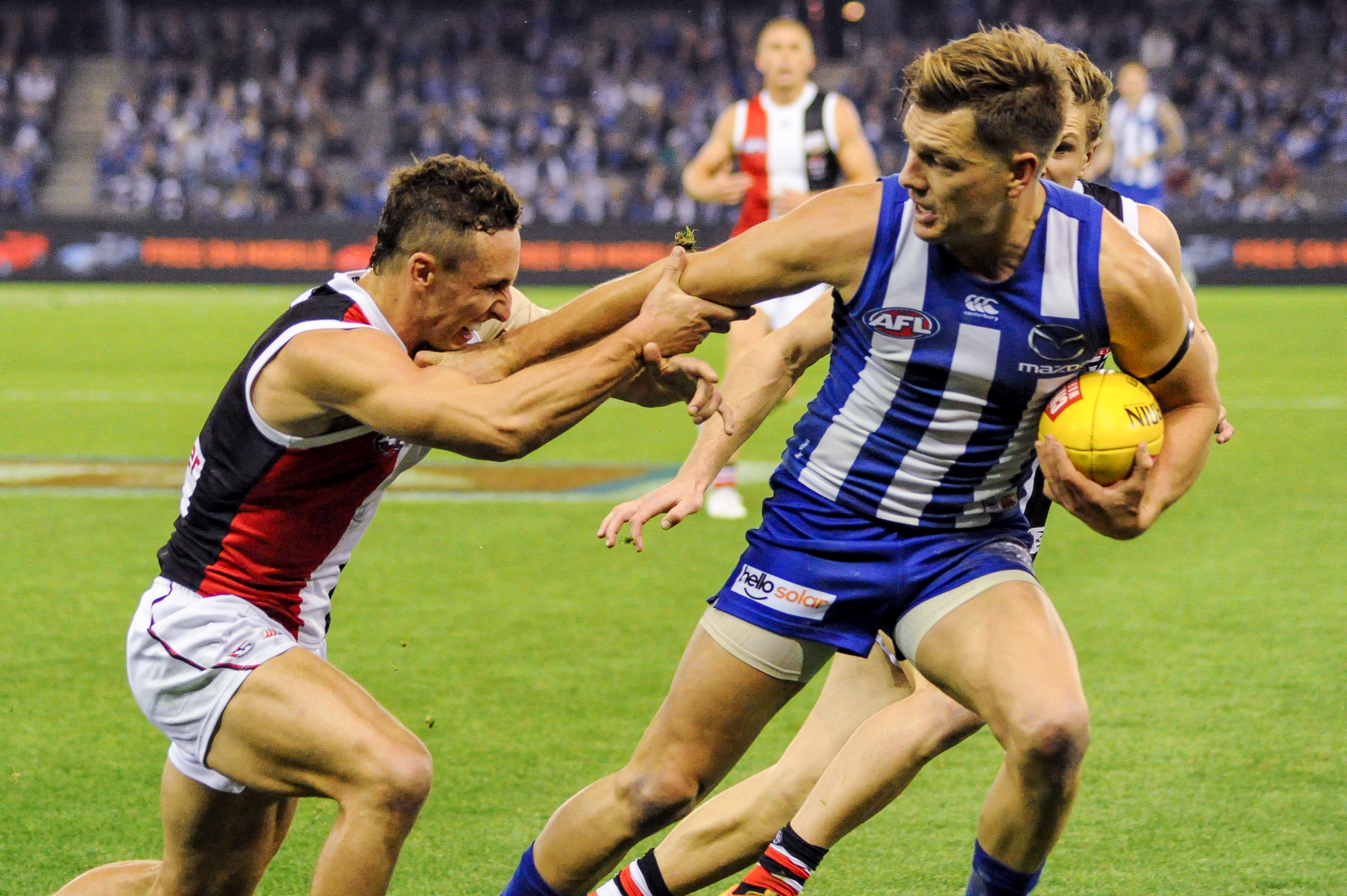
Shaun Higgins fends off Luke Dunstan

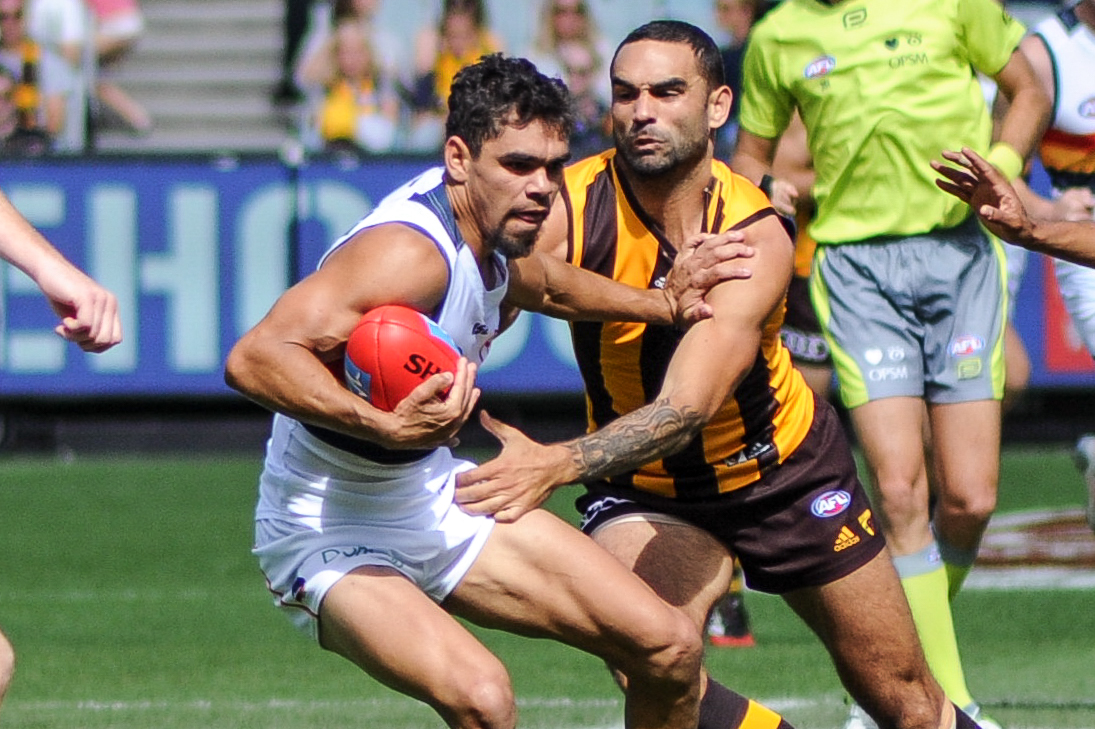
Charlie Cameron fends to the shoulder of Shaun Burgoyne

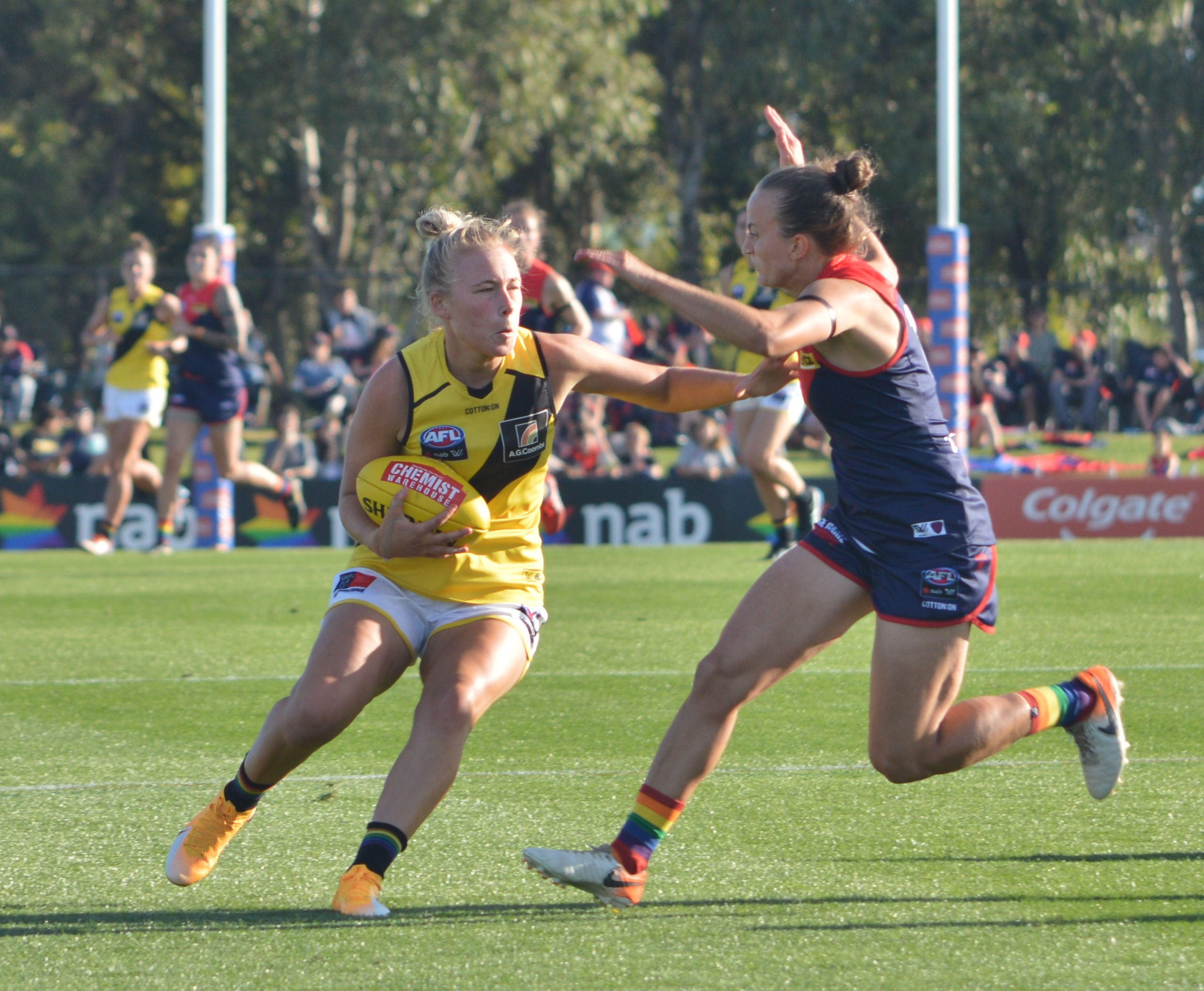
Kodi Jacques fends off Tyla Hanks

=== Gridiron football ===
Stiff arms are most often performed by running backs. Some notable players to use the stiff arm are Walter Payton, Earl Campbell, Derrick Henry, Adrian Peterson and Marshawn Lynch.

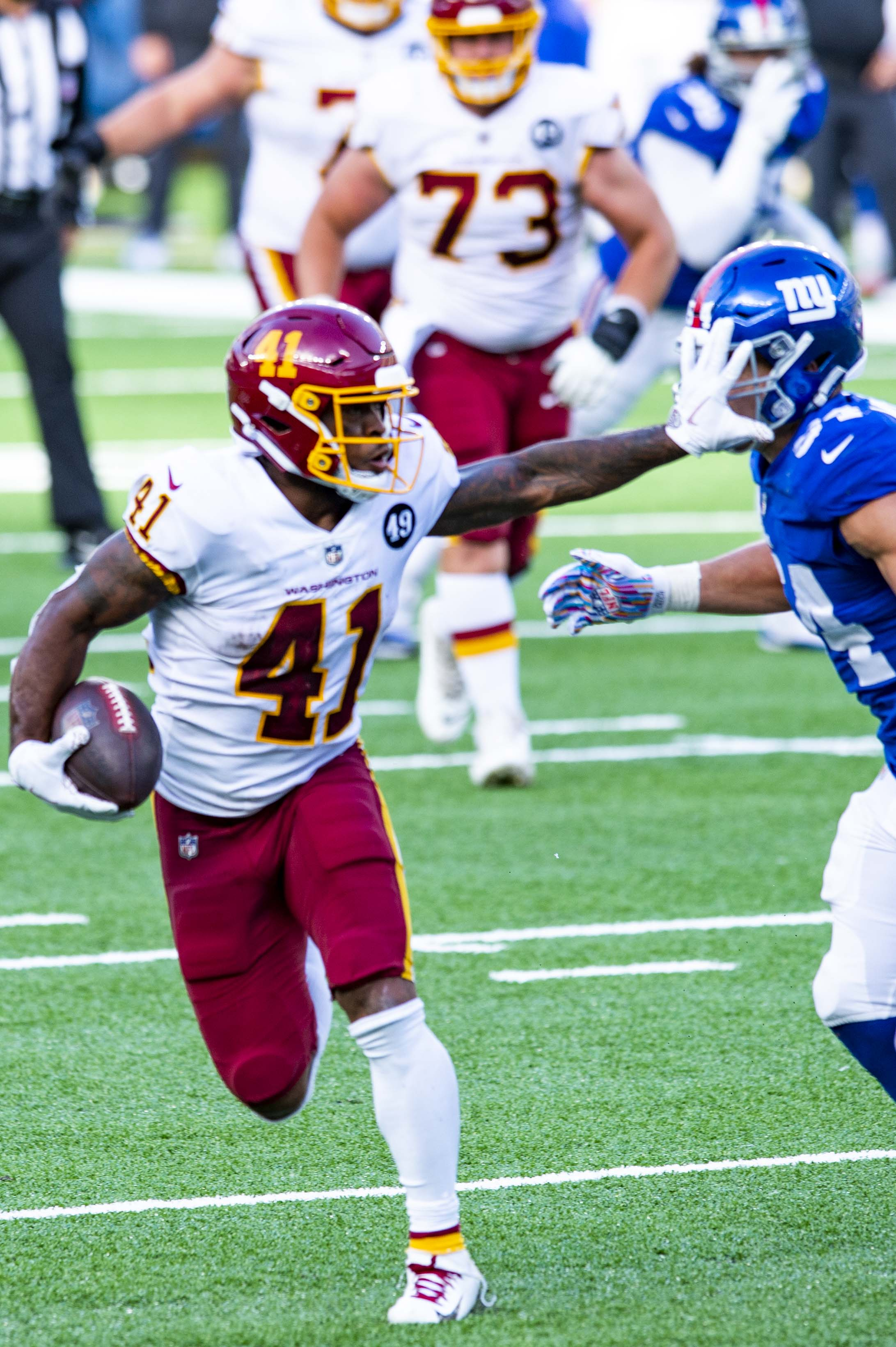
J. D. McKissic applies a fend to the face mask of an opponent during an American football game

=== Rugby football ===
Some famous players who use the fend include dual rugby/league international Sonny Bill Williams, and rugby union players Jonah Lomu, Jonathan Davies, Seán O'Brien, Cory Jane, Robbie Fruean and Julian Savea.

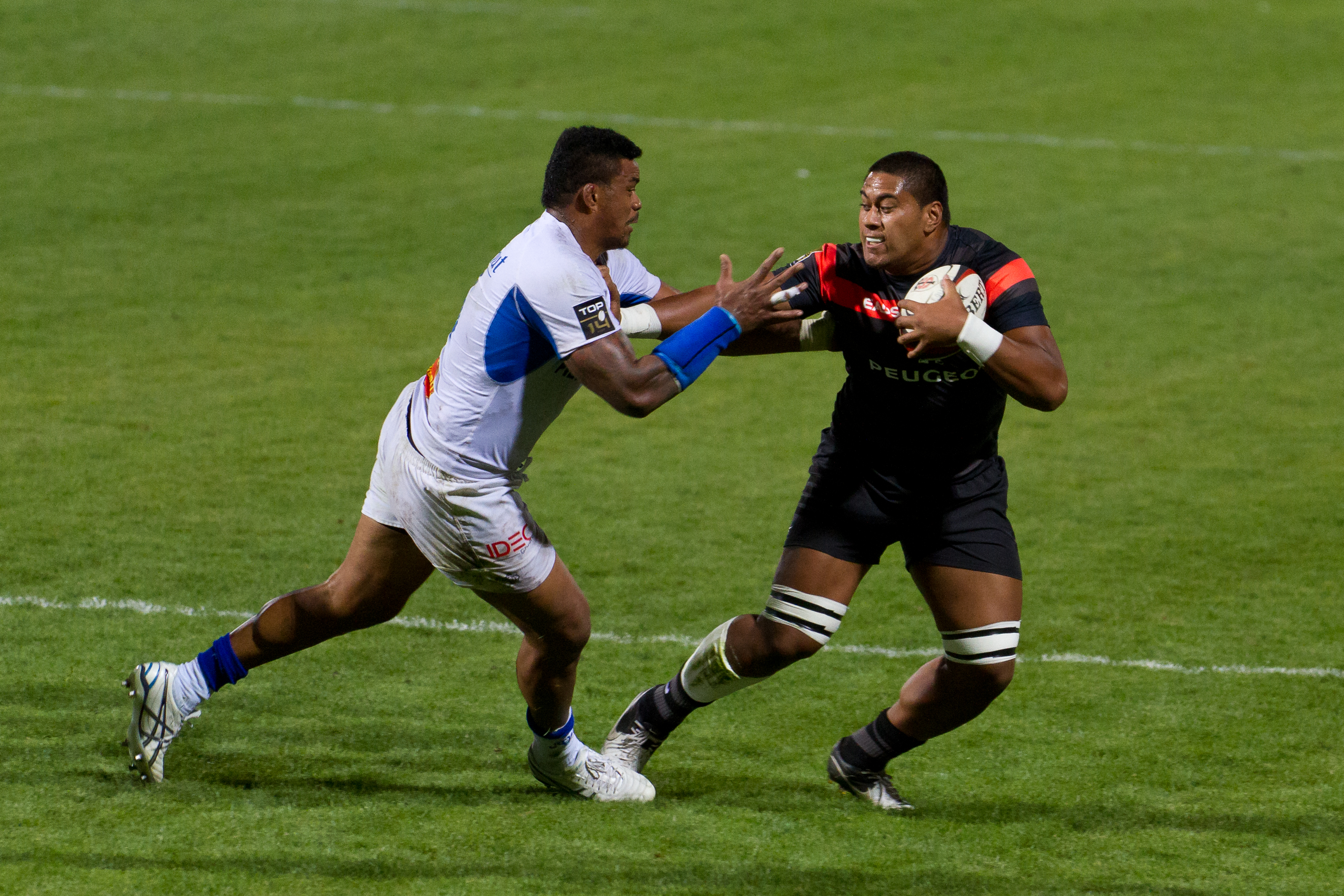
Fend by Edwin Maka during a rugby union game.

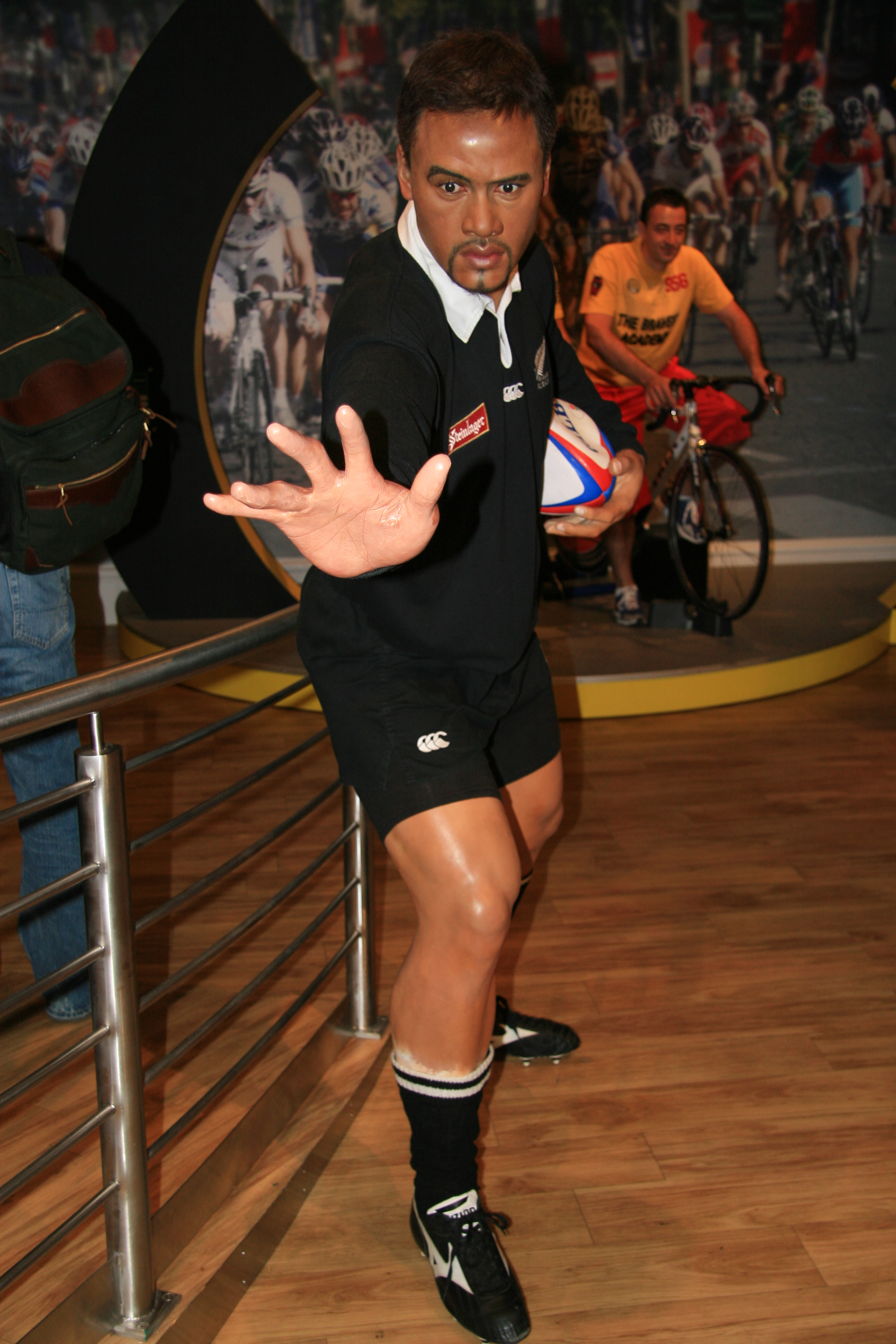
The Jonah Lomu stiff-arm immortalised in wax

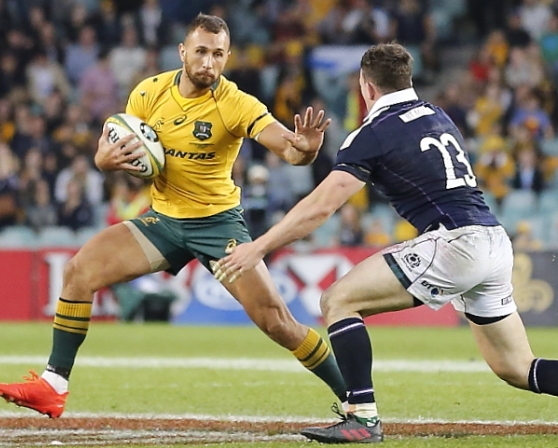
Quade Cooper (Australia) using a stiff-arm fend against Scotland's Matt Scott.
