= Gillian Galan =

French rugby union player

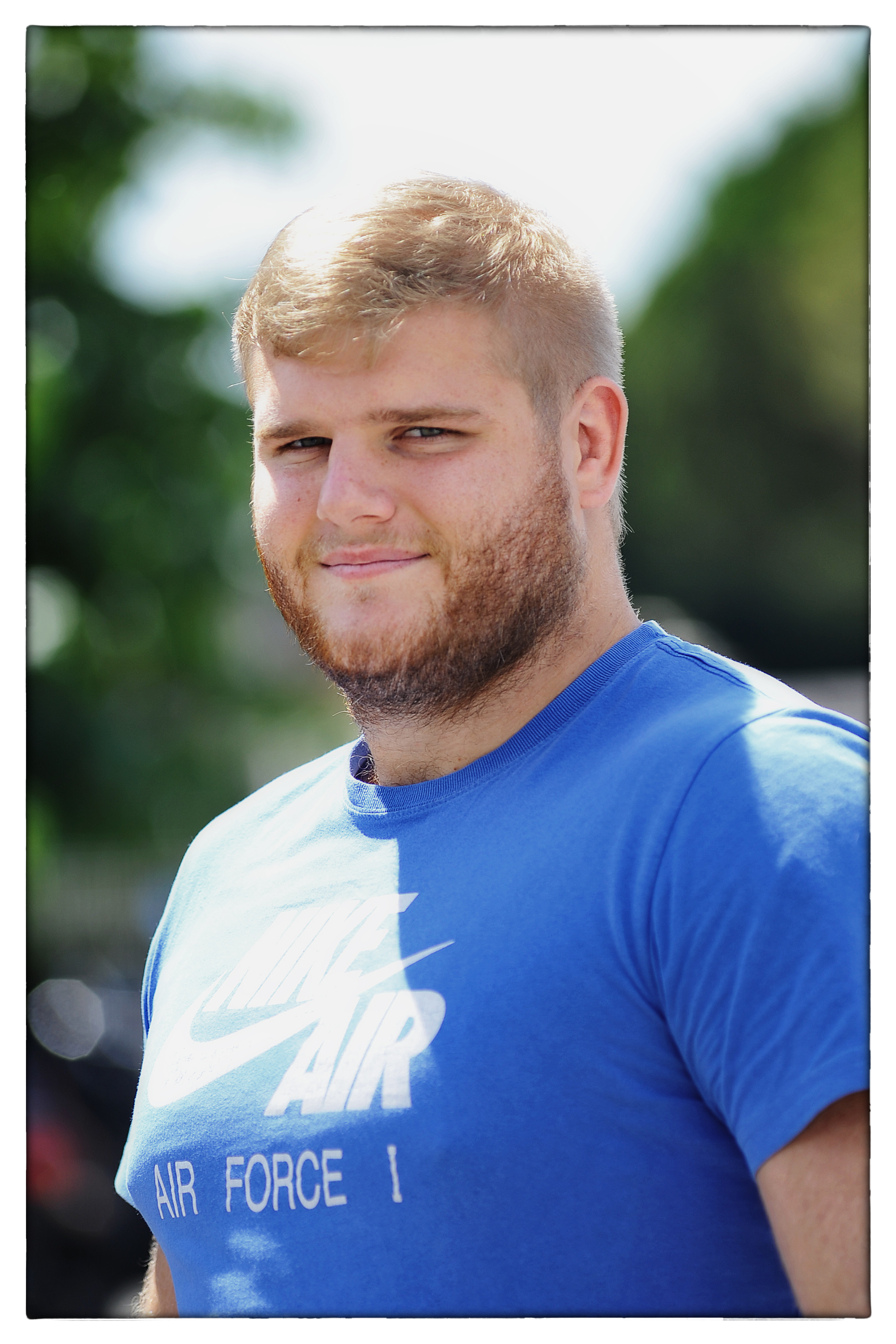
- Born: 7 August 1991 (age 35) Montauban, France
- Height: 1.93 m (6 ft 4 in)
- Weight: 130 kg (20 st 7 lb)

Rugby union career
- Position: Number 8
Senior career
Years	Team	Apps	(Points)
2011–2020	Toulouse	166	(110)
2020–	Lyon	0	(0)
- Correct as of 24 September 2021
International career
Years	Team	Apps	(Points)
2011	France U20	8	(0)

Gillian Galan (born 7 August 1991) is a French rugby union player. His position is Number 8 and he played for Lyon in the Top 14.
