= Lukáš Rapant =

- Born: 16 November 1982 (age 43) Havířov, Czechoslovakia
- Height: 1.80 m (5 ft 11 in)
- Weight: 108 kg (17 st 0 lb)

Rugby union career
- Position: Prop
Senior career
Years	Team	Apps	(Points)
2006–2017	Oyonnax	230	(5)
- Correct as of 30 December 2019
International career
Years	Team	Apps	(Points)
2003–2006	Czech Republic	14	(5)
- Correct as of 10 July 2013

Lukáš Rapant (born 16 November 1982) is a Czech rugby union footballer. His current position is Prop. His test debut for Czech Republic was in 2003 against Portugal in Lisbon. They lost that game 43-10. He signed for the Harlequins in March 2010.
