= Nathan Decron =

French rugby union player

- Born: 17 February 1998 (age 28) Nérac, France
- Height: 1.84 m (6 ft 1/2 in)
- Weight: 96 kg (15 st 2 lb; 212 lb)

Rugby union career
- Position: Centre
- Current team: Section Paloise
Youth career
- 2007–2013: US Nérac
- 2013–2017: SU Agen
- 2017–2019: Union Bordeaux Bègles
Senior career
Years	Team	Apps	(Points)
2016–2017	SU Agen	5	(0)
2018–2019	Union Bordeaux Bègles	6	(0)
2019–2021	SU Agen	33	(25)
2021–	Section Paloise	37	(10)
- Correct as of 11 April 2024
International career
Years	Team	Apps	(Points)
2017–2018	France U20	5	(5)
- Correct as of 11 April 2024

Nathan Decron (born 17 February 1998) is a France rugby union player who plays as a centre for Pau in the Top 14 competition. He won the Rugby Europe Under-18 Championship in 2015 with the France national under-18 rugby union team.

== Playing career ==
=== Early career ===
Nathan Decron began playing rugby union at his hometown club in 2007. In 2013, he joined the SU Agen training center, making his breakthrough into the first team in 2016. In 2017, he moved to Bordeaux, signing a three-year espoir contract with Union Bordeaux Bègles. Hindered by injuries, he returned to SU Agen in 2019.

=== Early Years at SU Agen ===
Decron began his professional career in the 2016-17 Pro D2 season, playing five matches. He made his debut against Stade montois.

=== Union Bordeaux Bègles ===
During the 2018–2019 season, he made six appearances for Union Bordeaux Bègles, five in Top 14 and one in the EPCR Challenge Cup. A knee injury in the 3rd round of the Espoirs French Championship against SU Agen kept him out for the following season, leading to an extensive rehabilitation at the CERS de Capbreton.

=== Return to SU Agen ===
He was loaned to SU Agen by UBB for the 2019–20 season. In February 2020, he signed his first professional contract with the Lot-et-Garonne club until 2022. In December 2020, he was named captain for the match against CA Brive. He experienced Agen's nightmare 2020–21 Top 14 season, concluding with no victories in Top 14.

=== Fresh start at Section Paloise ===
During the offseason, he joined Section Paloise from the 2021–22 Top 14 season. He reunited with his best friend Clément Laporte. Following an excellent start to the season, he injured his back during training and suffered a Spinal disc herniation in January 2022. Despite rehabilitation at CERS de Capbreton, he faced difficulties, including flat feet after short distances. Electromyograms showed initial nerve deficits of 70%, reduced to 50% after six months but persisting despite progress. Decron missed 11 months of competition. It was during the 2022–23 Top 14 season that Nathan Decron made his comeback, participating in 7 Top 14 matches and 3 EPCR Challenge Cup matches. Two seasons after this string of injuries, Nathan Decron has fully recovered and regained his peak physical form, although he still contends with nerve deficits necessitating compensatory muscle strengthening. Nonetheless, Decron has emerged as a linchpin for Section Paloise in 2023-24. This advancement secured him a three-season contract extension.

== National Team Career ==
Nathan Decron won the Rugby Europe Under-18 Championship in Toulouse in 2015 against Georgia with a score of 57–0. He scored 2 tries in this match.

He participated in the 2017 World Rugby Under 20 Championship in Georgia with the France national under-20 rugby union team. In the same year, he took part in the Six Nations Under 20s Championship.

In January 2021, he participated in the Six Nations 2021 training camp in Nice with the France national rugby union team, as a training partner.

== Honours ==
International

- 1× Rugby Europe Under-18 Championship: 2015
