= Antoine Battut =

French rugby union player

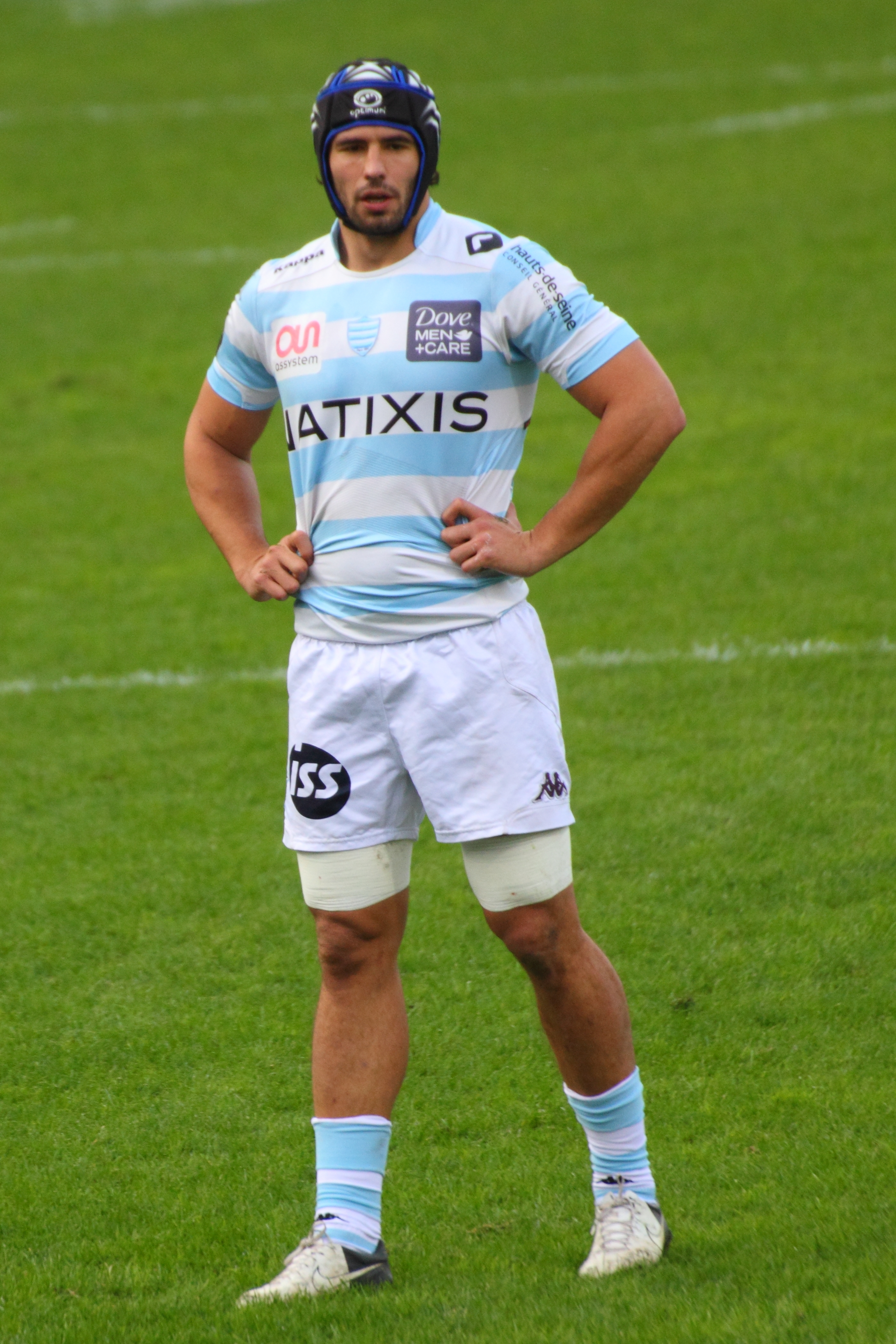
- Born: 1 January 1984 (age 42) Toulouse, France
- Height: 1.92 m (6 ft 3 1/2 in)
- Weight: 104 kg (16 st 5 lb)

Rugby union career
- Position: Flanker
Senior career
Years	Team	Apps	(Points)
2004–2006	Stade Toulousain	10	(0)
2006–2008	FC Auch	50	(10)
2008–2010	US Montauban	35	(10)
2010–2014	Racing Métro	75	(20)
2014–2017	Montpellier HR	44	(15)
2017–2020	Bayonne	55	(15)
- Correct as of 30 January 2019

Antoine Battut (born 1 January 1984) is a French rugby union player. His position is Flanker.

== Career ==
Antoine Battut began his professional career in 2004 with his home-town club Toulouse, starting only two games in two seasons, before moving to FC Auch, where he helped them to the 2006–07 Pro D2 championship. He played for Auch in the Top 14 the following season, but they were relegated and Battut joined Montauban. He played there until they were relegated for financial reasons in 2010. He joined Racing Métro in 2010.

Battut was an integral part of the French Top 14 side, Montpellier between 2014 and 2017. During that time he played twice in the 2015–16 European Rugby Challenge Cup.

In September 2017 Battut signed for Bayonne. As of January 2018 they play in the Pro D2 French Rugby Union League.
