= Paul Ngauamo =

Tongan rugby union player (born 1990)

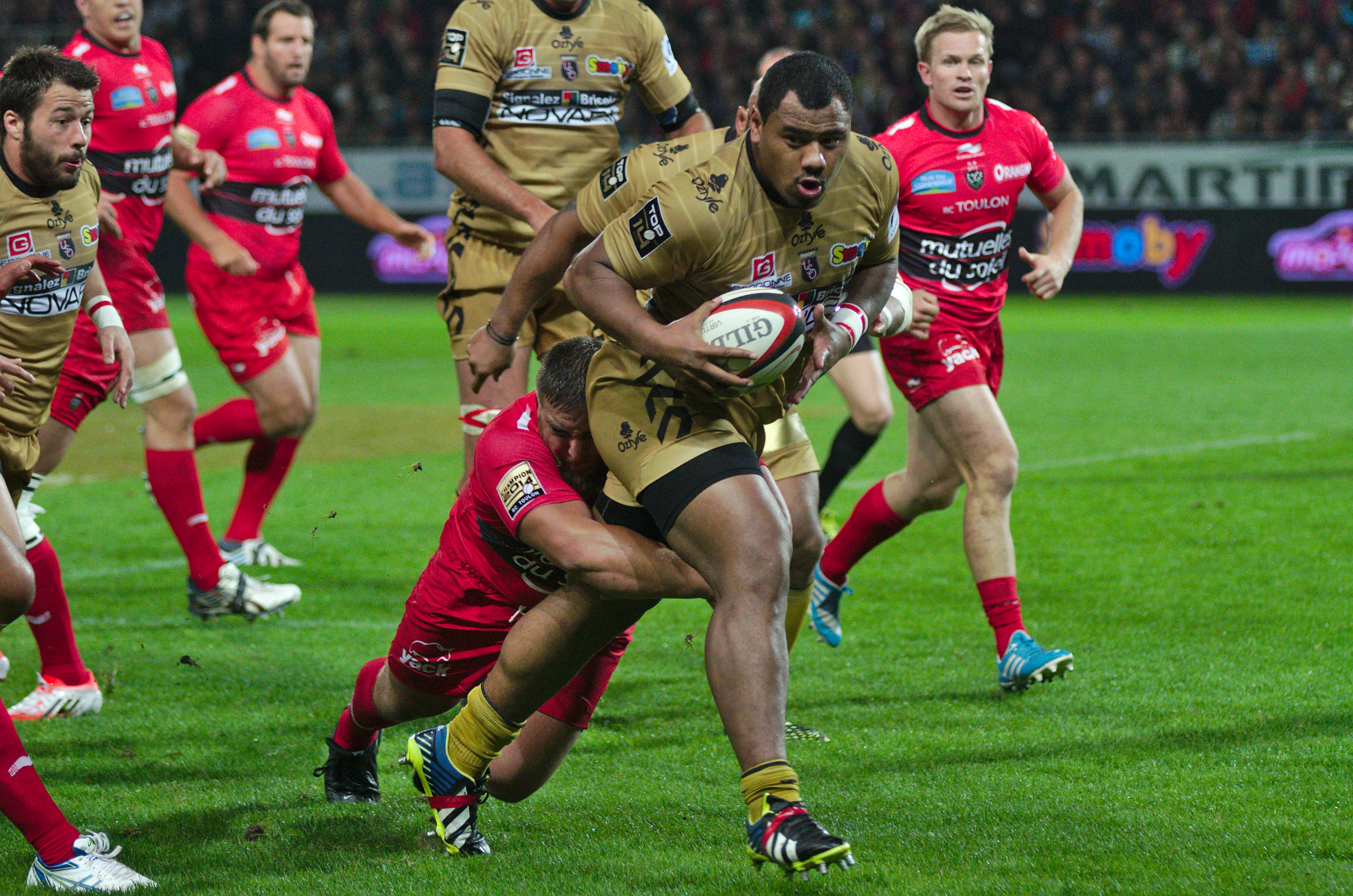
- Ngauamo representing Oyonnax during the Top 14
- Full name: Paula Mark Ngauamo
- Born: 19 February 1990 (age 36) Christchurch, New Zealand
- Height: 1.85 m (6 ft 1 in)
- Weight: 122 kg (269 lb; 19 st 3 lb)
- School: Christchurch Boys' High School

Rugby union career
- Position: Hooker
- Current team: Castres
Senior career
Years	Team	Apps	(Points)
2010–2011	Canterbury	11	(0)
2014–2015	Oyonnax	20	(5)
2015–2017	Mont-de-Marsan	26	(5)
2017–2020	Agen	65	(15)
2021–	Castres	43	(0)
- Correct as of 28 August 2023
International career
Years	Team	Apps	(Points)
2010	New Zealand U20	5	(5)
2014–	Tonga	27	(10)
- Correct as of 28 August 2023

Paula Mark Ngauamo (born 19 February 1990) is a professional rugby union player who plays as a hooker for Top 14 club Castres. Born in New Zealand, he represents Tonga at international level after qualifying on ancestry grounds.

== Club career ==
In 2010 Ngauamo played with Canterbury in the National Provincial Championship.

In 2012, he went to Australia to compete in the Shute Shield with West Harbour RFC . The following season he returned to New Zealand and played as an amateur with Sydenham Rugby.

In 2014, when he was initially supposed to join French club Bergerac in Fédérale 1, he finally joined Oyonnax in Top 14 as Neil Clark's medical replacement.

At the end of the 2014-2015 season, he signed for two seasons at Stade Montois in Pro D2.

In 2017, he signed with SU Agen as a medical joker for Marc Barthomeuf. In January 2018, after strong performances, he extended his contract until the end of the season as an "extra player". In April of that same year, he further extended his commitment with the Agenais club until 2020.

In January 2021, after extra-sporting incidents, he was released from his contract with Agen and immediately joined Castres Olympique.

== International career ==
Ngauamo played for the New Zealand national under-20 rugby union team in the 2010 IRB Junior World Championship.

He made his debut for Tonga in on 7 June 2014 for a match against Samoa. He was later selected for the Tongan squad at the 2015 Rugby World Cup. He played three games in the competition against Georgia, Namibia and New Zealand. He was suspended for three weeks for a dangerous tackle in the Pool match against New Zealand on 9 October.

In 2019, he was retained in the Tongan group to compete in the World Cup in Japan. He played three games in this competition, against Argentina, France and the United States.
