= Hugo Bonneval =

France international rugby union player

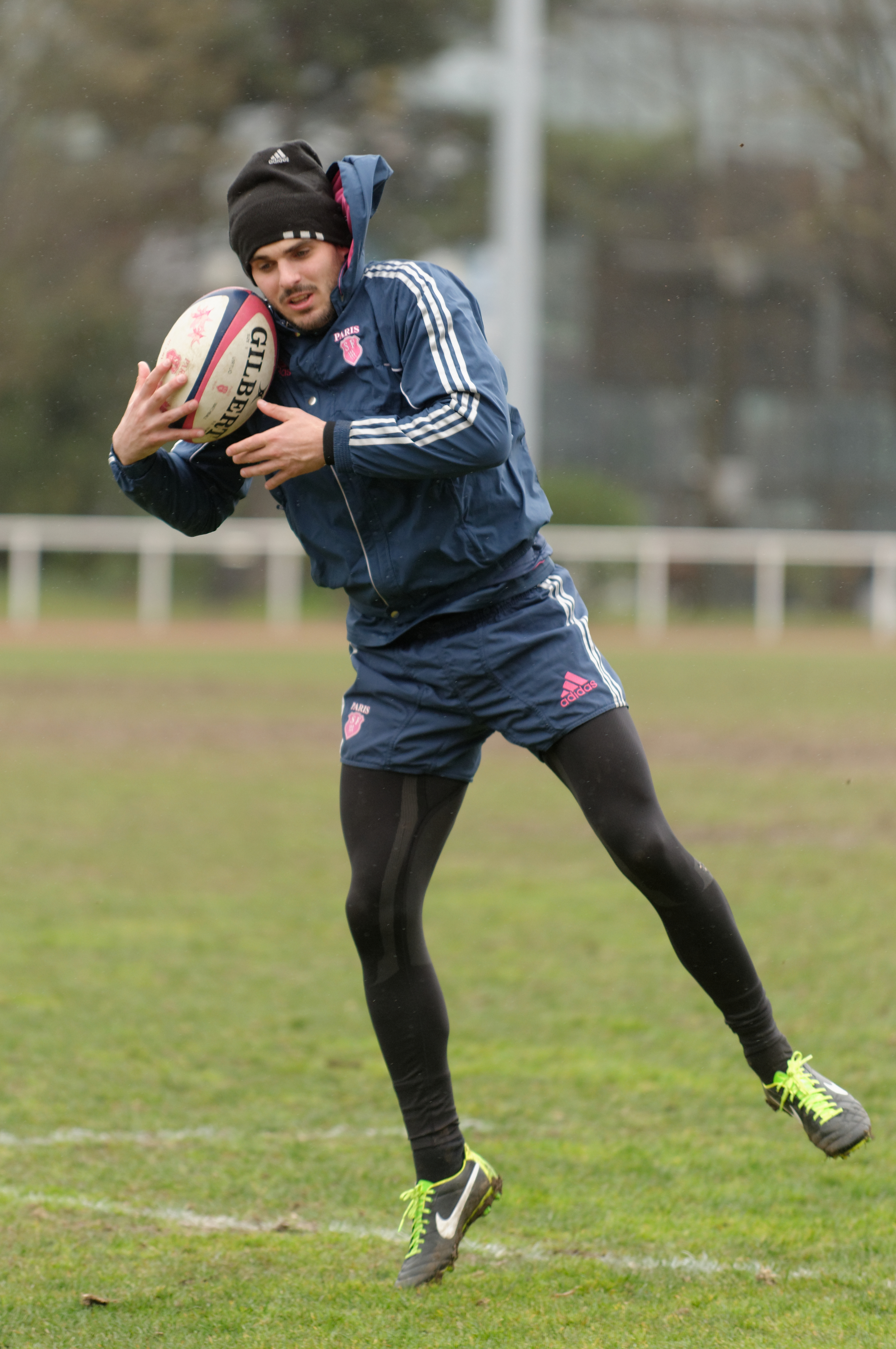
- Born: 19 November 1990 (age 35) Toulouse, France
- Height: 1.85 m (6 ft 1 in)
- Weight: 90 kg (14 st 2 lb; 198 lb)

Rugby union career
- Position: Fullback
Senior career
Years	Team	Apps	(Points)
2010–2017	Stade Français	110	(122)
2017–2020	Toulon	39	(27)
2020–2021	Pau	8	(5)
International career
Years	Team	Apps	(Points)
2014–2018	France	11	(20)

Hugo Bonneval (born 19 November 1990) is a former French rugby union player. He is the son of Eric Bonneval, another international French rugby player and the brother of Arthur Bonneval. He played mostly as a Fullback.

On 9 February 2014, he made his debut for France in a 30-10 win against Italy in the 2014 Six Nations Championship.

He is a member of the 'Champions for Peace' club, a group of more than 90 elite created by Peace and Sport, a Monaco-based international organization placed under the High Patronage of H.S.H Prince Albert II. This group of top level champions, wish to make sport a tool for dialogue and social cohesion.

Bonneval is currently a part time analyst for TV channel L'Équipe.

== Honours ==
Stade Français

- 1× Top 14: 2014–15
- 1× European Rugby Challenge Cup: 2016–17
