= Enzo Sanga =

French rugby player (born 1995)

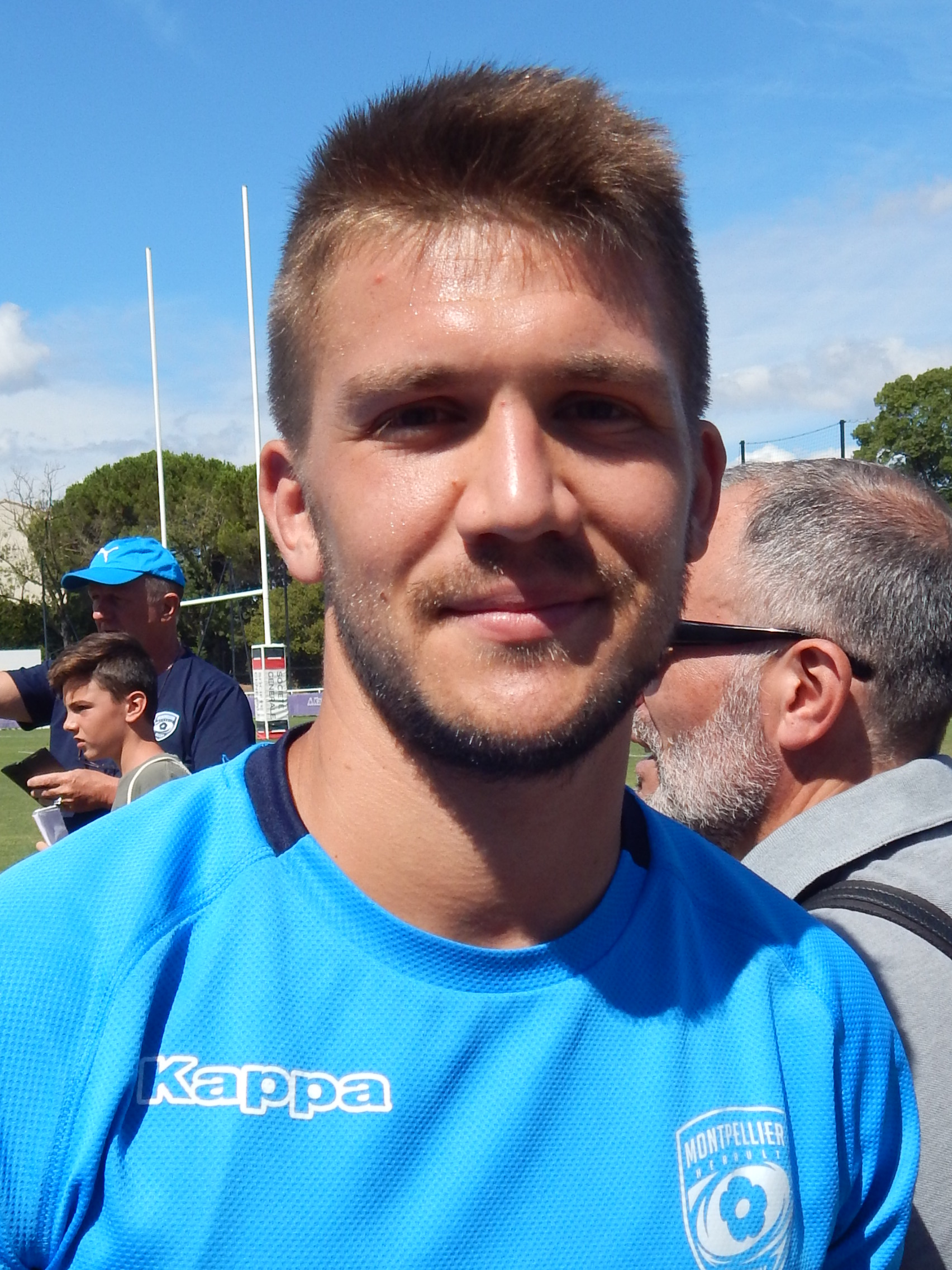
- Born: Enzo Sanga; May 19, 1995 (age 31) Vichy, France
- Height: 1.76 m (5 ft 9 in)
- Weight: 75 kg (165 lb)

Rugby union career
- Position: Scrum-half
Senior career
Years	Team	Apps	(Points)
2015–2017	ASM Clermont Auvergne	9	(5)
2017–	Montpellier	20	(5)
- Correct as of 20 July 2018

Enzo Sanga (born 19 May 1995) is a French rugby union footballer. He plays as a scrum-half.

Born in Vichy, Enzo Sanga currently plays for Montpellier Herault RC in the Top 14.
