= Vasil Kakovin =

Georgian rugby union player

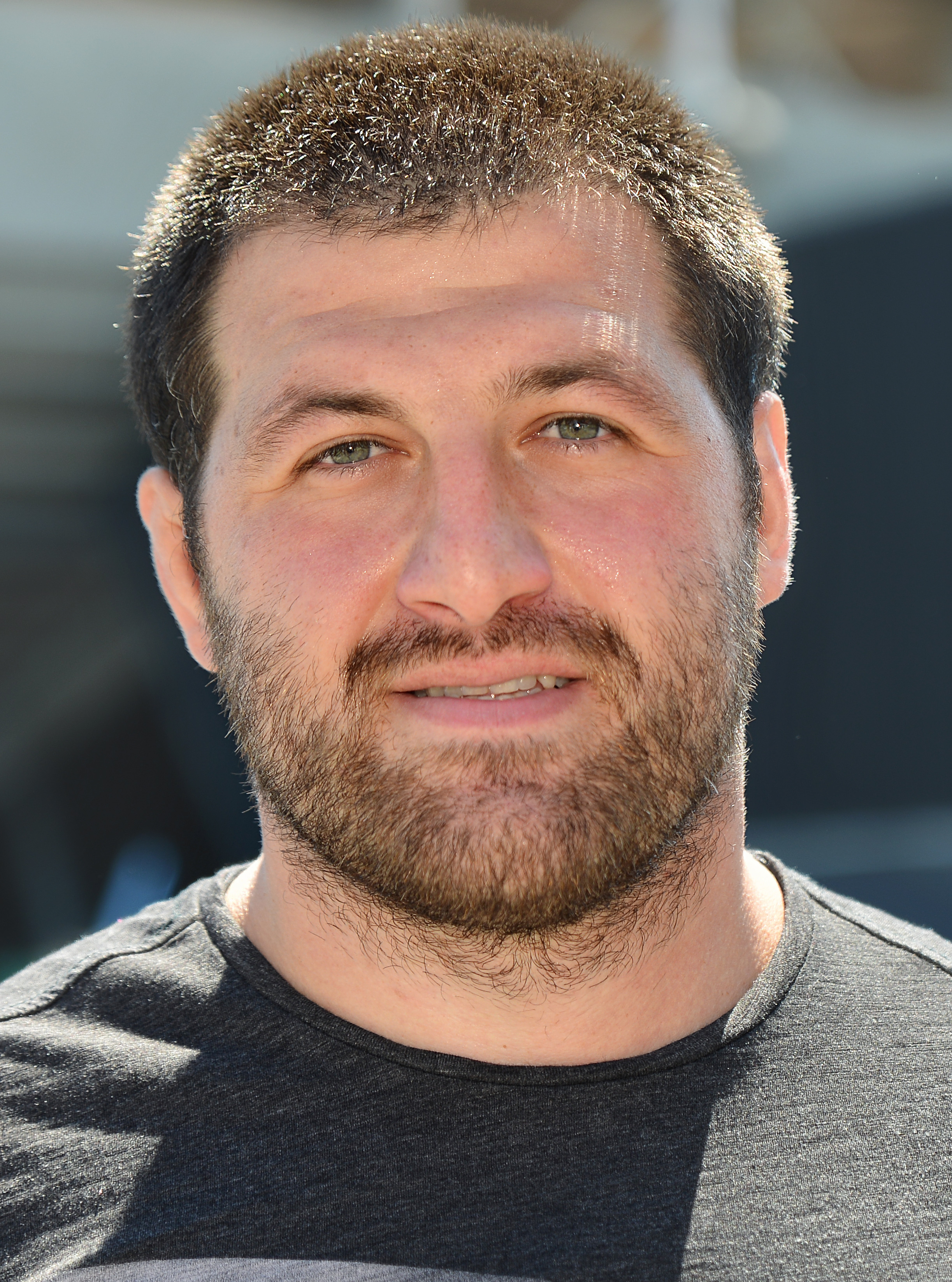
- Born: 1 December 1989 (age 36) Chiatura, Georgian SSR, Soviet Union
- Height: 1.83 m (6 ft 0 in)
- Weight: 115 kg (18 st 2 lb; 254 lb)

Rugby union career
- Position: Prop
Senior career
Years	Team	Apps	(Points)
2010–2012	Brive	38	(0)
2012–2017	Toulouse	87	(0)
2017-2020	Racing 92	65	(5)
2020–2023	Stade Français	47	(0)
2023-	Black Lion		
- Correct as of 12 July 2021
International career
Years	Team	Apps	(Points)
2008–2016	Georgia	25	(5)
- Correct as of 12 July 2021

Vasil Kakovin (born 1 December 1989) is a Georgian rugby union player. His position is prop, and he currently plays for Stade Français in the Top 14. He began his career in France with CA Brive before moving to Stade Toulousain in 2012. He played for Georgia in the 2011 Rugby World Cup.

== Career ==
=== Early career ===
Kakovin started his career with Georgia as back rower, as a 17-year-old he played either flanker or number 8 in the Under 19 World Cup for Georgia. A year later in 2008, he played in the inaugural Junior World Rugby Trophy as a versatile front rower, starting at either hooker or prop.

Soon after Junior World Rugby Trophy, Kakovin won his first cap for Georgia before his 19th birthday against Scotland A in November 2008, and holds the record for youngest ever Georgian prop on debut, and is one of just seven other front rowers to be capped as 18-year-olds although his early call up was mainly due to the unavailability of a large number of players in his position.

He featured again in another weakened Georgian side in the 2009 Churchill Cup that lost all its matches, however the scrum was one impressive area and the 19-year-old Kakovin playing at prop impressed and came out of the series well. The youngster continued to be part of the Georgian squad when the plethora of props playing in the French top divisions were unavailable, after the 2010 IRB Nations Cup he signed with Top 14 side Brive, it was as this point where he stopped playing hooker and focused on being a specialist prop.

=== Rise through the ranks ===
As he was still very young for a prop just aged 20, Kakovin was expected just to play mainly with the Espoirs (the academy/reserve side) in his first season at Brive, but he managed to play 20 matches throughout his first season, mainly as an impact sub from the bench, just starting four of those matches.

Despite missing out on selection for Georgia's matches in November 2010 as they had managed for a rare occasion a more full strength team, he returned to the side in June 2011 in an experimental side in preparation for the World Cup, and managed to rise above Goderdzi Shvelidze and Anton Peikrishvili to become second choice Georgian loosehead prop behind his teammate at Brive Davit Khinchagishvili, and managed selection for the 2011 World Cup in New Zealand.

He did not feature in the first two matches, but after a great cameo from the bench against Romania where he added some real dynamic ball carrying for Georgia towards the end of the match, for the Georgia's last match of the tournament against Argentina he replaced Davit Khinchagishvili who had a sub par match against the Romanians, and became Georgia's number one loosehead.

=== Breakthrough season ===
He carried his good form into the Top 14, and in his first match back from the World Cup, he notably destroyed the most capped French prop of all time Sylvain Marconnet, as Brive routed Biarritz 32–7 at home. Marconnet who was subbed at half time due to the Georgian's dominance over him called Kakovin "a phenomenon" after the match.

As well as with Georgia, Kakovin went past Khinchagishvili as Brive's first choice prop, and later he was named in the Midi Olympique team of the first half of the season, the newspaper described him as a "little bull" who was "very mobile, dynamic with ball in hand, and also excels at the scrum area".

His success meant that several much bigger teams than Brive were hunting his signature, in the end the four times European Champions Toulouse beat off competition from Clermont, Toulon and Racing-Métro, and signed him to replace the retiring South African international Daan Human at the club.

On 15 May 2020, Kakovin would sign for Top 14 rivals Stade Français Paris ahead of the 2020–21 season.
