= Alexis Palisson =

France international rugby union player (born 1987)

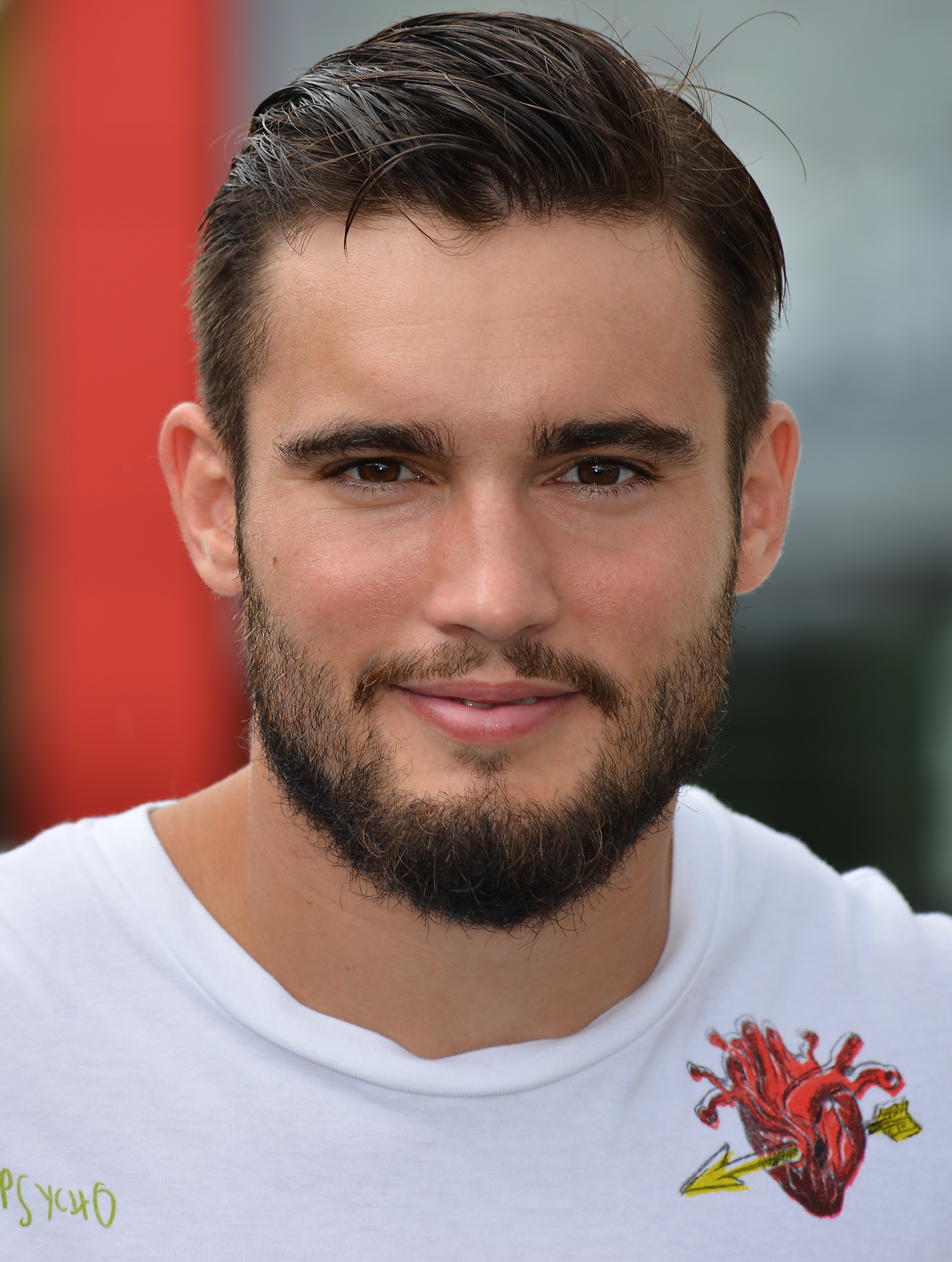
- Palisson in 2014
- Born: Alexis Palisson; 9 September 1987 (age 39) Montauban, France
- Height: 1.76 m (5 ft 9 in)
- Weight: 83 kg (13 st 1 lb; 183 lb)

Rugby union career
- Position: Fullback
- Current team: Colomiers
Senior career
Years	Team	Apps	(Points)
2005–2011	Brive	91	(278)
2011–2014	Toulon	58	(75)
2014–2017	Toulouse	39	(55)
2017–2020	Lyon	41	(56)
2020	Stade Français	1	(0)
2020–	Colomiers	45	(45)
- Correct as of 27 March 2023
International career
Years	Team	Apps	(Points)
2008–2012	France	21	(10)
National sevens team
Years	Team		Comps
2017–	France 7s		10

Alexis Palisson (born 9 September 1987) is a French rugby union footballer. He plays as a fullback and wing. He is 1.76 metres (5 ft 9 in) tall and weighs 83 kilograms (183 lb).

== Career ==
He currently plays for Colomiers in the French Pro D2. He made his international debut for France on 28 June 2008 against Australia. He also represented France in an U19 competition in Dubai.

He played as France reached the 2011 Rugby World Cup final in New Zealand. In May 2013 he started as Toulon beat Clermont Auvergne 16–15 in the 2013 Heineken Cup final.

== Controversy ==
In July 2011, Palisson featured shirtless in LGBTQ+ magazine Têtu wearing a fake moko and holding a taiaha. This caused controversy in New Zealand, with some Māori people saying that Palisson was being disrespectful to their culture and that permission should have been sought from a particular iwi as the moko usually represents iwi affiliation. Palisson was eventually forced to apologise for any offence caused and stressed that he respects tattoo traditions.

== International tries ==
#	Date	Venue	Opponent	Result (France-...)	Competition
1.	28 June 2008	ANZ Stadium, Sydney, Australia	Australia	13–34	Test Match
2.	26 February 2010	Millennium Stadium, Cardiff, Wales	Wales	26–20	Six Nations Championship
