= Hendrik Roodt =

South African rugby union player

- Born: Hendrik Lambertus Roodt; 6 November 1987 (age 39) Lichtenburg, South Africa
- Height: 1.98 m (6 ft 6 in)
- Weight: 121 kg (19 st 1 lb)
- School: Lichtenburg High School

Rugby union career
- Position: Lock
- Current team: Lyon OU
Senior career
Years	Team	Apps	(Points)
2014–17	FC Grenoble	88	(25)
2017–	Lyon OU	60	(15)
- Correct as of 14 December 2019
Provincial / State sides
Years	Team	Apps	(Points)
2007–2008	Blue Bulls	18	(5)
2010–2011	Griquas	22	(15)
2012–2013	Golden Lions	18	(10)
- Correct as of 19 May 2013
Super Rugby
Years	Team	Apps	(Points)
2010	Waratahs	1	(0)
2012	Lions	7	(0)
- Correct as of 18 May 2012

Hendrik Roodt (born 6 November 1987) is a South African rugby union footballer. His regular playing position is Lock. He represents the Lions in Super Rugby and the Golden Lions in the Currie Cup and Vodacom Cup. Roodt has previously played for the Blue Bulls, Waratahs and Griquas.

He joined French Top 14 side Grenoble in 2013.

Hendrik Roodt is married to Mariska Roodt.
