= Jean-Marcellin Buttin =

French rugby union player

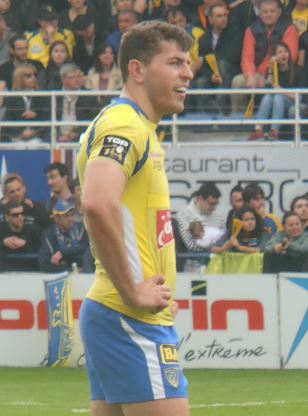
- Born: Jean-Marcellin Buttin; 16 December 1991 (age 34) Metz, France
- Height: 1.92 m (6 ft 4 in)
- Weight: 90 kg (14 st 2 lb; 198 lb)

Rugby union career
- Position: Fullback
Senior career
Years	Team	Apps	(Points)
2009–15	Clermont	77	(90)
2015-2017	Bordeaux	40	(25)
2017-2020	Lyon	36	(25)
- Correct as of 31 January 2015
International career
Years	Team	Apps	(Points)
2012	France	2	(0)

Jean-Marcellin Buttin (born 16 December 1991) is a French rugby union player for Bordeaux in the Top 14. He plays as a Fullback.

== Biography ==
Trained first at RC Metz then in Dijon, he joined ASM Clermont Auvergne in 2009 where he played with the junior team. On 21 January 2011 he played his first professional match against Saracens in the Heineken Cup. He made his French international debut as a first half replacement for Clément Poitrenaud in the Six Nations loss to Wales on 17 March 2012.
