= Clément Ric =

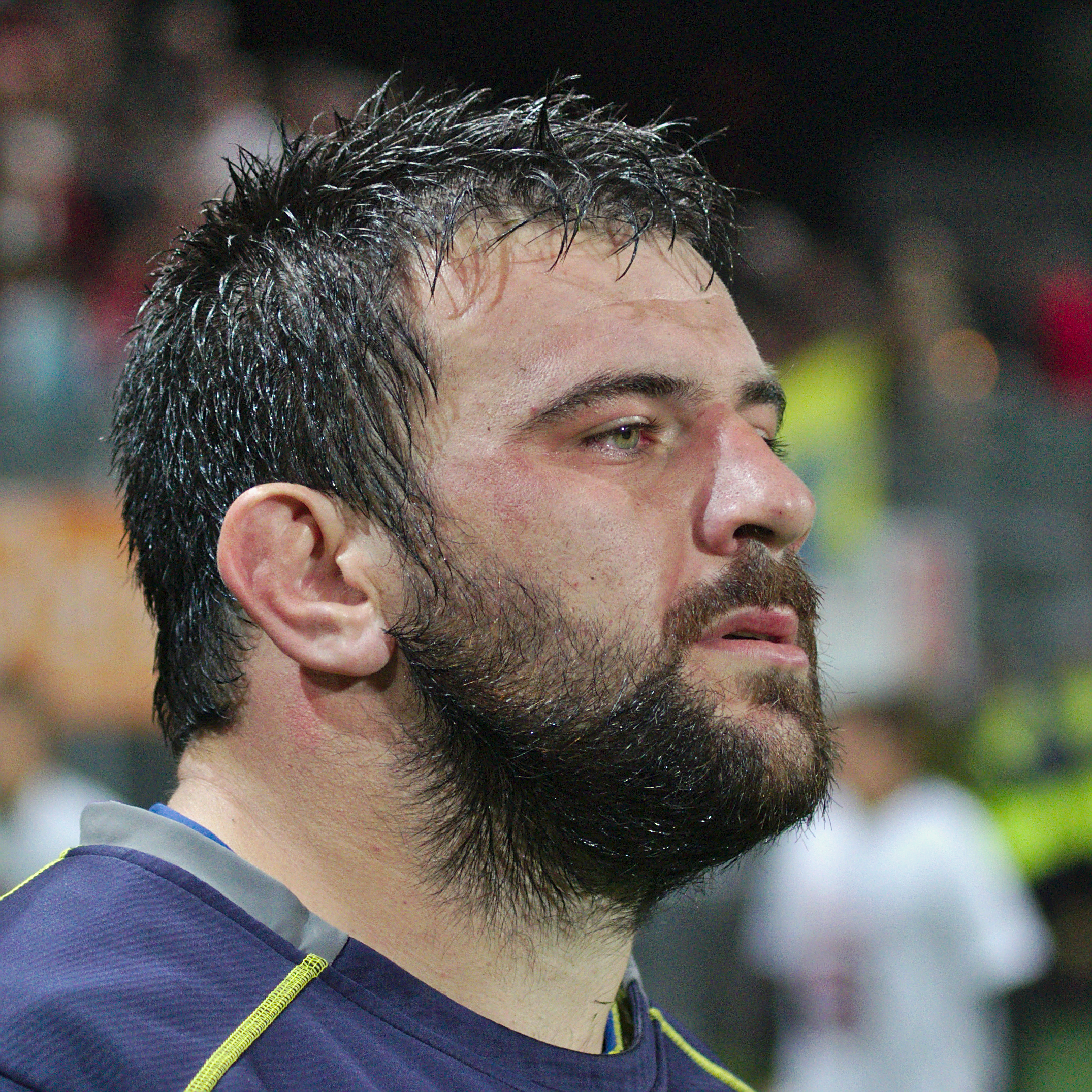
- Born: 18 July 1988 (age 38) Mauriac, France
- Height: 1.82 m (5 ft 11 1/2 in)
- Weight: 117 kg (18 st 6 lb; 258 lb)

Rugby union career
- Position: Prop
Senior career
Years	Team	Apps	(Points)
2007–17	Clermont Auvergne	166	(10)
2017-	Lyon OU	47	(05)
- Correct as of 13 December 2019

Clément Ric (born 18 July 1988) is a French rugby union player. His position is Prop and he currently plays for Lyon OU in the Top 14.

== Honours ==
- Top 14 Champion – 2009–10
