= Edwin Maka =

NZ rugby union player

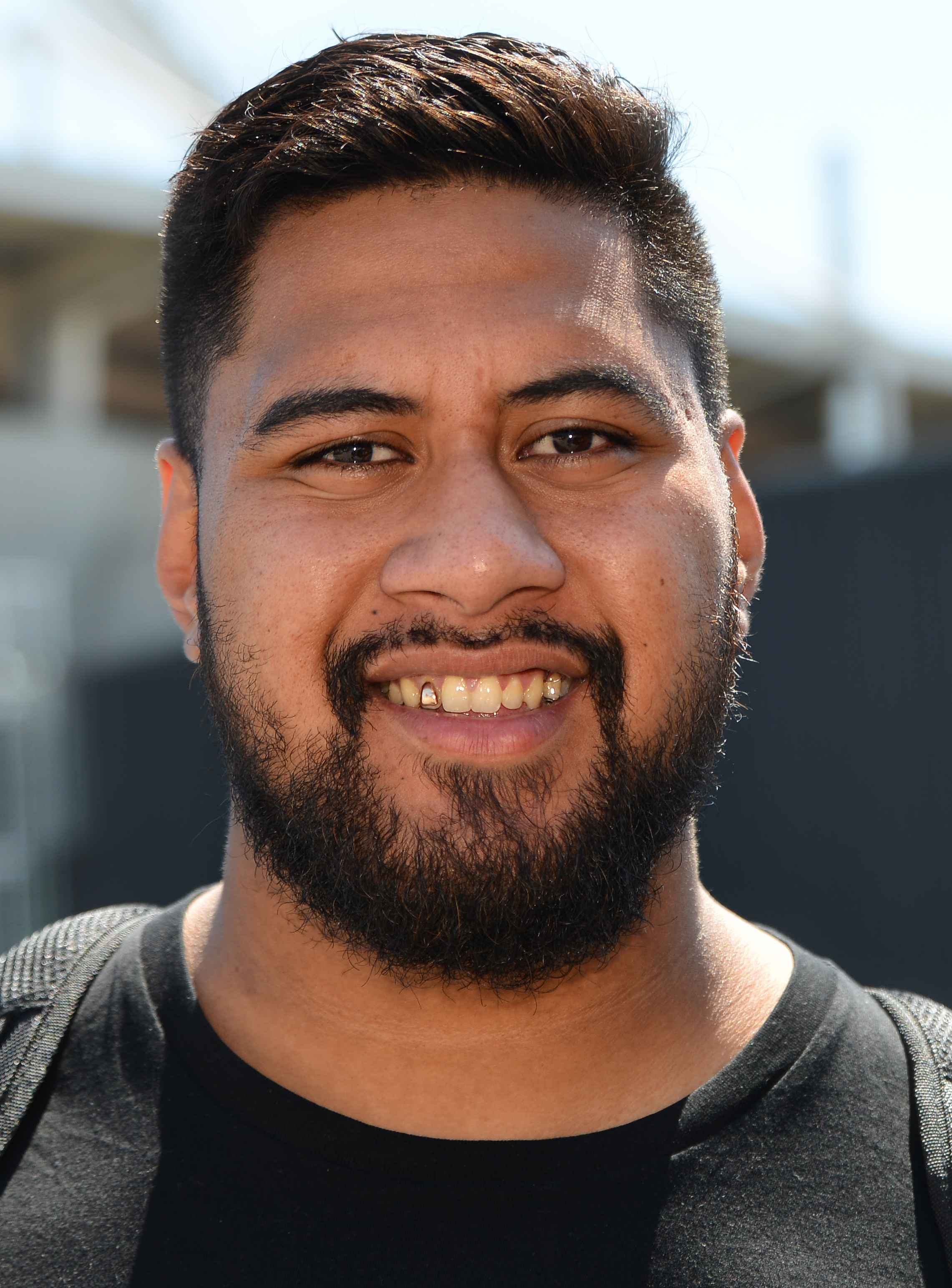
- Born: 4 June 1993 (age 33) Auckland, New Zealand
- Height: 2.02 m (6 ft 7 1/2 in)
- Weight: 147 kg (23 st 2 lb; 324 lb)

Rugby union career
- Position: Number 8
Senior career
Years	Team	Apps	(Points)
2012–2017	Toulouse	61	(30)
2017–2019	Racing 92	9	(0)
2019–2020	Bayonne	5	(0)
- Correct as of 1 December 2019

Edwin Maka (born 25 February 1993) is a New Zealand-born Tongan rugby union player. His position is Number 8 and he currently plays for Bayonne in the Top 14.

Mother is Malia Lesina Kelela Latu from the village of Koloua-'o-Kolomotu'a / Tofoa, Tonga and his father is Fisipuna Maka from the village of Longoteme.

He is the nephew of former Tonga international Finau Maka and former All Black and former Tonga coach Isitolo Maka. Edwin joined Toulouse in 2012 from Australia and signed a two-year contract, which was extended to five years after he made his debut in August 2012.
