= Julien Bardy =

Portugal international rugby union player

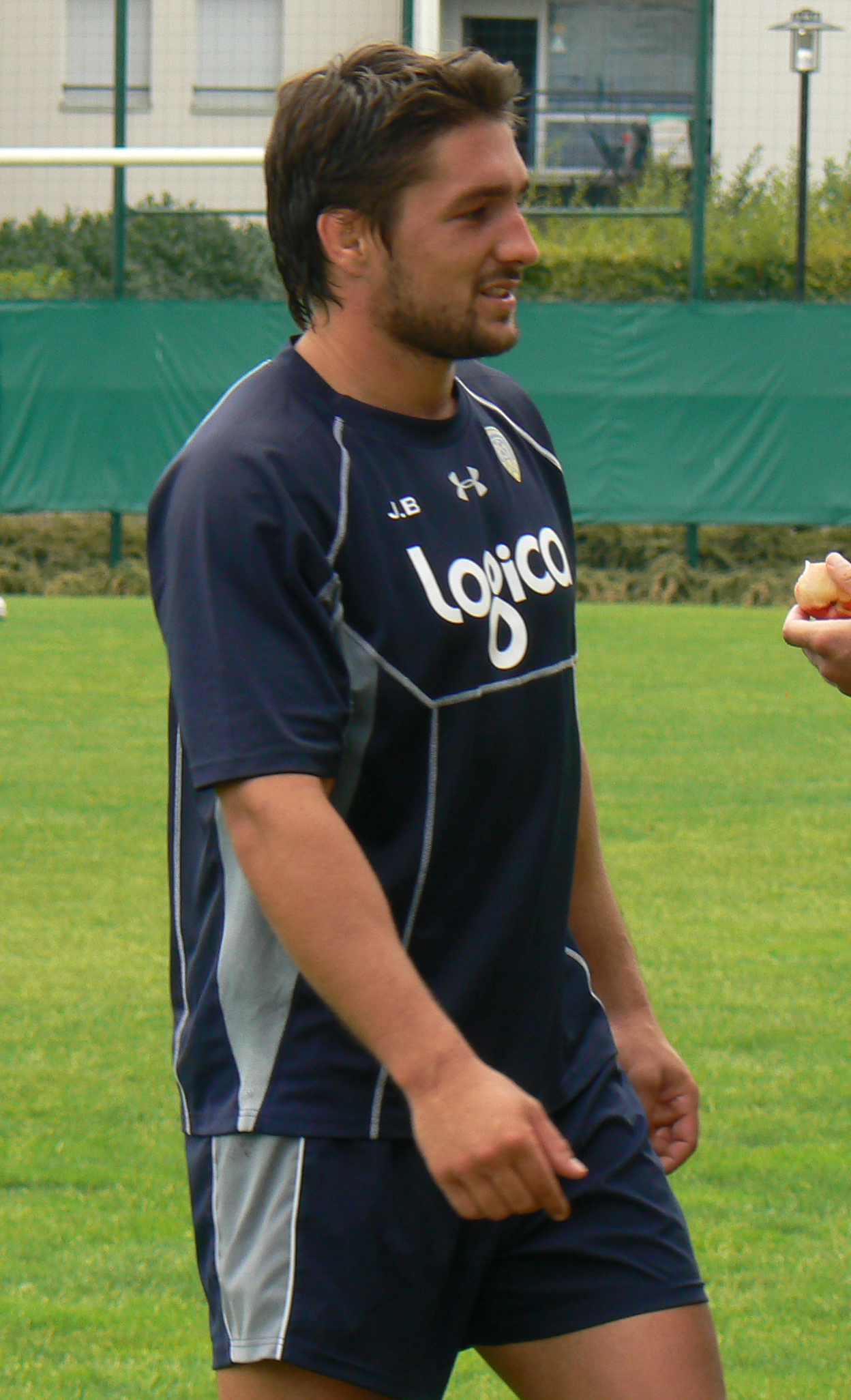
- Julien Bardy at a training for ASM Clermont Auvergne
- Born: 3 April 1986 (age 40) Clermont-Ferrand, France
- Height: 1.88 m (6 ft 2 in)
- Weight: 98 kg (15 st 6)

Rugby union career
- Position: Flanker
Senior career
Years	Team	Apps	(Points)
2009-2017	Clermont	118	(50)
2017-2020	Montpellier	36	(0)
International career
Years	Team	Apps	(Points)
2008-2015	Portugal	24	(25)

Julien de Sousa Bardy (born Clermont-Ferrand, 3 April 1986) is a French-born Portuguese former rugby union player. He played as a flanker.

== Club career ==
He played for ASM Clermont Auvergne in the Top 14 since 2009/10 to 2016/17. He won twice the Top 14 in 2009/10 and 2016/17. He played afterwards for Montpellier Hérault RC, from 2017/18 to 2019/20, when he finished his career, aged 34 years old.

== International career ==
He is of Portuguese descent and decided to represent Portugal. He had 24 caps, with 5 tries scored, 25 points on aggregate, from 2008 to 2015. He had his first cap at the 13–21 loss to Canada, at 1 November 2008, in Lisbon, in a tour, when he played as a substitute. His final cap was at the 11–3 win over Germany, at 28 February 2015, in Lisbon, for the Six Nations B.
