= Ludovic Radosavljevic =

French rugby union player

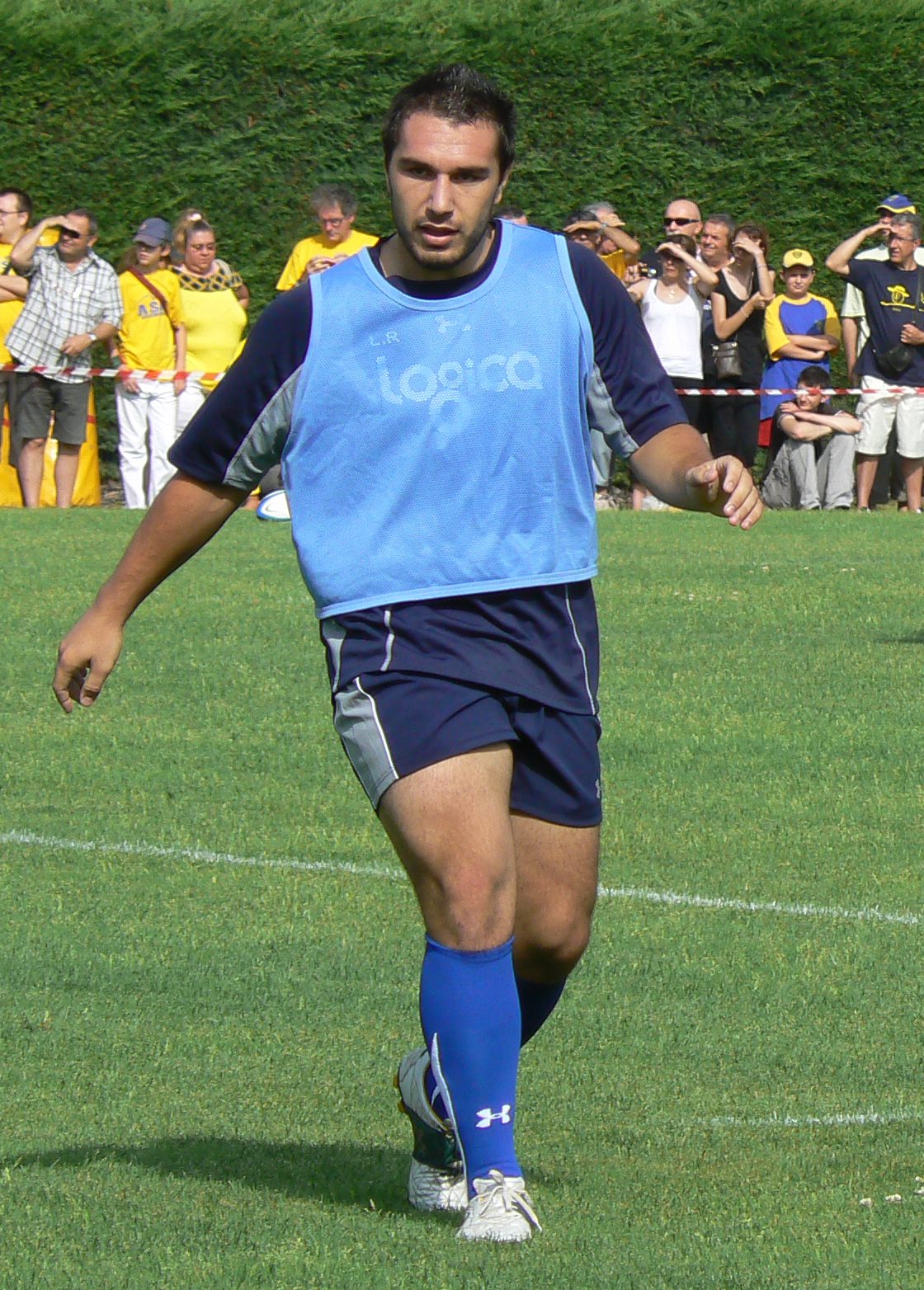
- Born: 17 August 1989 (age 37) Avignon, France
- Height: 1.80 m (5 ft 11 in)
- Weight: 85 kg (13 st 5 lb)

Rugby union career
- Position: Scrum-half
Senior career
Years	Team	Apps	(Points)
2007–2008	Pays d'Aix RC	12	(0)
2008–2017	Clermont	108	(98)
2017–2020	Castres	73	(43)
2020–	Provence	18	(5)
- Correct as of 19 January 2021

Ludovic Radosavljevic (born 17 August 1989) is a French rugby union player. His position is Scrum-half and he plays for Pro D2 club Provence. He began his career with Pays d'Aix RC, now known as Provence Rugby, in the third-tier Fédérale 1 before moving to Clermont Auvergne in 2008 and then Castres in 2017. He eventually returned to his first club Provence in 2020. On 3 November 2021, he was made redundant by his club after having been found guilty of racially abusing a black player, calling him "banana eater".

== Personal life ==
Rasodavljevic was born in France and is of Serbian descent.

== Honours ==
=== Club ===
(France) Castres

- Top 14: 2017–18
