= 2014–15 Top 14 season =

French Rugby Union competition

2014–15 Top 14
- Countries: France
- Date: 16 August 2014 – 13 June 2015
- Champions: Stade Français (14th title)
- Runners-up: Clermont
- Relegated: Lyon, Bayonne
- Matches played: 187
- Attendance: 2,692,804 (average 14,400 per match)
- Highest attendance: 79,000 (play-offs); Stade Français v Clermont; 13 June 2015; 64,819 (league stage); Toulon v Toulouse; 28 March 2015
- Lowest attendance: 5,000; Stade Français v Lyon; 23 August 2014
- Tries scored: 735 (average 3.9 per match)
- Top point scorer: (France) Jonathan Wisniewski (Grenoble); 325 points
- Top try scorer: (Samoa) David Smith (Toulon); 13 tries

Official website
- www.lnr.fr/rugby-top-14

The 2014–15 Top 14 competition was a French domestic rugby union club competition operated by the Ligue Nationale de Rugby (LNR). Two new teams from the 2013–14 Pro D2 season were promoted to Top 14 this season, Lyon and La Rochelle in place of the two relegated teams, Perpignan and Biarritz Olympique. Home-and-away play began on 16 August 2014 and ended on 23 May 2015. This was followed by a playoff stage involving the top six teams, culminating in the final on 13 June 2015.

== Teams ==
Locations of the 2014–15 Top 14 teams

| Club | City (department) | Stadium | Capacity |
|---|---|---|---|
| Bayonne | Bayonne (Pyrénées-Atlantiques) | Stade Jean Dauger (Note: Bayonne took one match across the Spanish border to Estadio Anoeta in Donostia-San Sebastián in 2012–13 and in 2013–14.) | 17,000 |
| Bordeaux Bègles | Bordeaux (Gironde) | Stade Chaban-Delmas (Bordeaux); Stade André Moga (Bègles) (Note: Bordeaux Bègles has made the larger Stade Chaban-Delmas their primary home since 2013–14 at the expense of their traditional home of Stade André-Moga.) | 34,700; 10,000 |
| Brive | Brive-la-Gaillarde (Corrèze) | Stade Amédée-Domenech | 16,000 |
| Castres Olympique | Castres (Tarn) | Stade Pierre-Antoine (Note: Castres took one home match to Stade de la Méditerranée in Béziers.) | 11,500 |
| Clermont Auvergne | Clermont-Ferrand (Puy-de-Dôme) | Stade Marcel-Michelin | 18,030 |
| Grenoble | Grenoble (Isère) | Stade Lesdiguières; Stade des Alpes (Note: In 2013–14, Grenoble played six home matches at the city's largest venue, Stade des Alpes, from 2014 onwards Grenoble became the primary tenant at the venue and hosted nearly all of its home games there.) | 12,000; 20,068 |
| La Rochelle | La Rochelle (Charente-Maritime) | Stade Marcel-Deflandre | 15,000 |
| Lyon | Lyon (Rhône) | Matmut Stadium | 11,805 |
| Montpellier | Montpellier (Hérault) | Altrad Stadium | 14,700 |
| Oyonnax | Oyonnax (Ain) | Stade Charles-Mathon | 11,400 |
| Racing Métro 92 (Note: Following the season, Racing Métro dropped "Métro" from its name, becoming simply Racing 92.) | Colombes (Hauts-de-Seine) | Stade Yves-du-Manoir (Note: Racing took one home match to Stade Océane in Le Havre.) | 14,000 |
| Stade Français Paris | Paris, 16th arrondissement | Stade Jean-Bouin (Note: In the past, Stade Français has taken occasional home matches to Stade de France, but did not do so in 2014–15.) | 20,000 |
| Toulon | Toulon (Var) | Stade Mayol (Note: So far in 2014–15, Toulon has taken one home match to Allianz Riviera in Nice and one to Stade Vélodrome in Marseille.) | 15,400 (Note: Toulon's ground capacity is up to 15,400 from 15,250 the previous season.) |
| Toulouse | Toulouse (Haute-Garonne) | Stade Ernest-Wallon (Note: Toulouse often take high-demand home matches to the city's largest sporting venue, Stadium Municipal. However, they did not do so in either 2013–14 or 2014–15, as it was undergoing renovation for UEFA Euro 2016.) | 19,500 |

== Competition format ==
The top six teams at the end of the regular season (after all the teams played one another twice, once at home, once away) enter a knockout stage to decide the Champions of France. This consists of three rounds: the teams finishing third to sixth in the table play quarter-finals (hosted by the third and fourth placed teams). The winners then face the top two teams in the semi-finals, with the winners meeting in the final at Stade de France.

The LNR uses a slightly different bonus points system from that used in most other rugby competitions. It trialled a new system in 2007–08 explicitly designed to prevent a losing team from earning more than one bonus point in a match, a system that also made it impossible for either team to earn a bonus point in a drawn match. LNR chose to continue with this system for subsequent seasons.

France's bonus point system operates as follows:

- 4 points for a win.
- 2 points for a draw.
- 1 bonus point for winning while scoring at least 3 more tries than the opponent. This replaces the standard bonus point for scoring 4 tries regardless of the match result.
- 1 bonus point for losing by 5 points (or less). This is a change from previous seasons, in which the margin was 7 points or less.

== Table ==
2014–15 Top 14 table
| | Club | Played | Won | Drawn | Lost | Points For | Points Against | Points Difference | Tries For | Tries Against | Try Bonus | Losing Bonus | Points |
| 1 | Toulon (SF) | 26 | 16 | 0 | 10 | 740 | 525 | +215 | 81 | 52 | 7 | 5 | 76 |
| 2 | Clermont (RU) | 26 | 16 | 1 | 9 | 630 | 464 | +166 | 58 | 40 | 5 | 4 | 75 |
| 3 | Toulouse (SF) | 26 | 16 | 0 | 10 | 573 | 504 | +69 | 53 | 37 | 3 | 3 | 70 |
| 4 | Stade Français (CH) | 26 | 15 | 1 | 10 | 591 | 576 | +15 | 60 | 54 | 6 | 2 | 70 |
| 5 | Racing Métro (QF) | 26 | 13 | 3 | 10 | 551 | 497 | +54 | 52 | 37 | 3 | 4 | 65 |
| 6 | Oyonnax (QF) | 26 | 14 | 0 | 12 | 514 | 507 | +7 | 37 | 43 | 2 | 4 | 62 |
| 7 | Bordeaux | 26 | 12 | 0 | 14 | 701 | 578 | +123 | 66 | 45 | 4 | 9 | 61 |
| 8 | Montpellier | 26 | 11 | 2 | 13 | 537 | 516 | +21 | 44 | 46 | 2 | 5 | 55 |
| 9 | La Rochelle | 26 | 10 | 5 | 11 | 520 | 659 | –139 | 43 | 67 | 2 | 2 | 54 |
| 10 | Brive | 26 | 12 | 0 | 14 | 502 | 619 | −117 | 40 | 66 | 3 | 2 | 53 |
| 11 | Grenoble | 26 | 11 | 0 | 15 | 626 | 735 | –109 | 54 | 70 | 3 | 6 | 53 |
| 12 | Castres | 26 | 11 | 0 | 15 | 509 | 627 | −118 | 50 | 63 | 4 | 4 | 52 |
| 13 | Bayonne (R) | 26 | 10 | 1 | 15 | 522 | 548 | −26 | 44 | 46 | 5 | 5 | 52 |
| 14 | Lyon (R) | 26 | 8 | 1 | 17 | 469 | 630 | −161 | 42 | 58 | 0 | 7 | 41 |
If teams are level at any stage, tiebreakers are applied in the following order: 1. Competition points earned in head-to-head matches 2. Points difference in head-to-head matches 3. Try differential in head-to-head matches 4. Points difference in all matches 5. Try differential in all matches 6. Points scored in all matches 7. Tries scored in all matches 8. Fewer matches forfeited' 9. Classification in the previous Top 14 season
Green background (rows 1 and 2) receive semi-final play-off places and receive berths in the 2015–16 European Rugby Champions Cup.; Blue background (rows 3 to 6) receive quarter-final play-off places, and receive berths in the Champions Cup.; Yellow background (row 7) indicates the team that advances to a play-off against the winner of the Aviva Premiership vs Pro12 play-off, or 2014–15 European Rugby Challenge Cup winner if they have not already qualified for the Champions Cup.; Plain background indicates teams that earn a place in the European Rugby Challenge Cup.; Red background (row 13 and 14) will be relegated to Rugby Pro D2.; Updated 26 April 2015

== Relegation ==
Normally, the teams that finish in 13th and 14th places in the table are relegated to Pro D2 at the end of the season. In certain circumstances, "financial reasons" may cause a higher placed team to be demoted instead. This last happened at the end of the 2009–10 season when 12th place Montauban were relegated thereby reprieving 13th place Bayonne.

== Fixtures ==
The outline fixtures schedule was announced on 16 May 2014. Detailed fixtures information evolved as the season progressed (i.e. specific kick off times).

=== Round 1 ===
15 August 2014
20:45

| Bayonne | 15 – 29 | Toulon |
| | Stats |

Stade Jean Dauger
Attendance: 16,999
Referee: Jérôme Garcès

16 August 2014
14:45

| Clermont | 30 – 26 | Grenoble (BP) |
| | Stats |

Stade Marcel-Michelin
Attendance: 16,784
Referee: Cyril Lafon

16 August 2014
18:30

| Bordeaux Bègles | 18 – 9 | Lyon |
| | Stats |

Stade André Moga
Attendance: 7,979
Referee: Pascal Gaüzère

16 August 2014
18:30

| (BP) Brive | 37 – 15 | La Rochelle |
| | Stats |

Stade Amédée-Domenech
Attendance: 12,051
Referee: Christophe Berdos

16 August 2014
18:30

| (BP) Castres | 22 – 25 | Stade Français |
| | Stats |

Stade de la Méditerranée, Béziers
Attendance: 12,084
Referee: Alexandre Ruiz

16 August 2014
18:30

| Toulouse | 20 – 19 | Oyonnax (BP) |
| | Stats |

Stade Ernest-Wallon
Attendance: 14,205
Referee: Maxime Chalon

16 August 2014
20:45

| (BP) Montpellier | 16 – 19 | Racing Métro |
| | Stats |

Altrad Stadium
Attendance: 12,827
Referee: Salem Attalah

=== Round 2 ===
22 August 2014
20:30

| (BP) Toulouse | 35 – 6 | Castres |
| | Stats |

Stade Ernest-Wallon
Attendance: 16,588
Referee: Pascal Gaüzère

23 August 2014
14:45

| Brive | 6 – 21 | Clermont |
| | Stats |

Stade Amédée-Domenech
Attendance: 13,187
Referee: Alexandre Ruiz

23 August 2014
18:30

| (BP) Bayonne | 38 – 12 | Oyonnax |
| | Stats |

Stade Jean Dauger
Attendance: 13,398
Referee: Laurent Cardona

23 August 2014
18:30

| Bordeaux Bègles | 30 – 21 | Racing Métro |
| | Stats |

Stade Chaban-Delmas
Attendance: 19,578
Referee: Jérôme Garcès

23 August 2014
18:30

| Montpellier | 20 – 17 | Grenoble (BP) |
| | Stats |

Altrad Stadium
Attendance: 11,044
Referee: Sébastien Minery

23 August 2014
18:30

| (BP) Toulon | 60 – 19 | La Rochelle |
| | Stats |

Stade Mayol
Attendance: 15,174
Referee: Maxime Chalon

23 August 2014
20:45

| Stade Français | 23 – 20 | Lyon (BP) |
| | Stats |

Stade Jean-Bouin
Attendance: 5,000
Referee: Cédric Marchat

=== Round 3 ===
29 August 2014
20:45

| (BP) Clermont | 20 – 21 | Montpellier |
| | Stats |

Stade Marcel-Michelin
Attendance: 17,255
Referee: Romain Poite

30 August 2014
14:45

| La Rochelle | 37 – 25 | Toulouse |
| | Stats |

Stade Marcel-Deflandre
Attendance: 14,765
Referee: Cyril Lafon

30 August 2014
18:30

| (BP) Castres | 30 – 6 | Bayonne |
| | Stats |

Stade Pierre-Antoine
Attendance: 6,939
Referee: Maxime Chalon

30 August 2014
18:30

| (BP) Grenoble | 37 – 23 | Bordeaux Bègles |
| | Stats |

Stade Lesdiguières
Attendance: 11,427
Referee: Salem Attalah

30 August 2014
18:30

| Lyon | 24 – 6 | Brive |
| | Stats |

Matmut Stadium
Attendance: 9,147
Referee: Laurent Cardona

30 August 2014
18:30

| (BP) Oyonnax | 33 – 6 | Stade Français |
| | Stats |

Stade Charles-Mathon
Attendance: 7,771
Referee: Christophe Berdos

30 August 2014
20:45

| Racing Métro | 17 – 10 | Toulon |
| | Stats |

Stade Yves-du-Manoir
Attendance: 9,090
Referee: Sébastien Minery

=== Round 4 ===
5 September 2014
20:45

| (BP) Montpellier | 43 – 10 | Castres |
| | Stats |

Altrad Stadium
Attendance: 12,319
Referee: Mathieu Raynal

6 September 2014
14:45

| Brive | 26 – 19 | Toulouse |
| | Stats |

Stade Amédée-Domenech
Attendance: 11,683
Referee: Romain Poite

6 September 2014
17:00

| (BP) Clermont | 32 – 6 | Racing Métro |
| | Stats |

Stade Marcel-Michelin
Attendance: 15,934
Referee: Christophe Berdos

6 September 2014
18:30

| (BP) Grenoble | 30 – 12 | La Rochelle |
| | Stats |

Stade Lesdiguières
Attendance: 12,010
Referee: Alexandre Ruiz

6 September 2014
18:30

| Lyon | 26 – 23 | Oyonnax (BP) |
| | Stats |

Matmut Stadium
Attendance: 10,224
Referee: Sébastien Minery

6 September 2014
18:30

| (BP) Stade Français | 34 – 29 | Bayonne (BP) |
| | Stats |

Stade Jean-Bouin
Attendance: 10,098
Referee: Patrick Péchambert

6 September 2014
20:45

| Toulon | 18 – 13 | Bordeaux Bègles (BP) |
| | Stats |

Stade Mayol
Attendance: 13,963
Referee: Cédric Marchat

=== Round 5 ===
12 September 2014
20:00

| (BP) La Rochelle | 41 – 19 | Castres |
| | Stats |

Stade Marcel-Deflandre
Attendance: 14,110
Referee: Sébastien Minery

13 September 2014
14:45

| (BP) Toulouse | 9 – 13 | Clermont |
| | Stats |

Stade Ernest-Wallon
Attendance: 18,161
Referee: Salem Attalah

13 September 2014
18:30

| Bayonne | 23 – 6 | Brive |
| | Stats |

Stade Jean Dauger
Attendance: 11,037
Referee: Cédric Marchat

13 September 2014
18:30

| Oyonnax | 40 – 27 | Grenoble |
| | Stats |

Stade Charles-Mathon
Attendance: 8,482
Referee: Romain Poite

13 September 2014
18:30

| (BP) Racing Métro | 28 – 11 | Lyon |
| | Stats |

Stade Yves-du-Manoir
Attendance: 5,756
Referee: Maxime Chalon

13 September 2014
20:45

| (BP) Toulon | 24 – 28 | Stade Français |
| | Stats |

Stade Mayol
Attendance: 13,985
Referee: Mathieu Raynal

14 September 2014
14:30

| Bordeaux Bègles | 27 – 21 | Montpellier |
| | Stats |

Stade Chaban-Delmas
Attendance: 22,265
Referee: Christophe Berdos

=== Round 6 ===
19 September 2014
20:45

| Brive | 13 – 53 | Toulon (BP) |
| | Stats |

Stade Amédée-Domenech
Attendance: 11,736
Referee: Pascal Gaüzère

20 September 2014
14:45

| Racing Métro | 27 – 16 | Toulouse |
| | Stats |

Stade Yves-du-Manoir
Attendance: 9,550
Referee: Alexandre Ruiz

20 September 2014
18:30

| Castres | 27 – 18 | Oyonnax |
| | Stats |

Stade Pierre-Antoine
Attendance: 6,846
Referee: Patrick Péchambert

20 September 2014
18:30

| (BP) Clermont | 43 – 12 | Lyon |
| | Stats |

Stade Marcel-Michelin
Attendance: 15,958
Referee: Mathieu Raynal

20 September 2014
18:30

| Grenoble | 24 – 15 | Bayonne |
| | Stats |

Stade des Alpes
Attendance: 11,991
Referee: Cyril Lafon

20 September 2014
18:30

| (BP) La Rochelle | 26 – 29 | Bordeaux Bègles |
| | Stats |

Stade Marcel-Deflandre
Attendance: 14,692
Referee: Jérôme Garcès

20 September 2014
20:45

| Montpellier | 23 – 3 | Stade Français |
| | Stats |

Altrad Stadium
Attendance: 12,262
Referee: Laurent Cardona

=== Round 7 ===
26 September 2014
20:45

| (BP) Bayonne | 35 – 19 | Toulouse |
| | Stats |

Stade Jean Dauger
Attendance: 13,630
Referee: Sébastien Minery

27 September 2014
14:45

| (BP) Toulon | 40 – 17 | Montpellier |
| | Stats |

Stade Mayol
Attendance: 14,890
Referee: Romain Poite

27 September 2014
18:30

| Brive | 34 – 24 | Bordeaux Bègles |
| | Stats |

Stade Amédée-Domenech
Attendance: 11,261
Referee: Salem Attalah

27 September 2014
18:30

| Grenoble | 27 – 25 | Racing Métro (BP) |
| | Stats |

Stade des Alpes
Attendance: 14,972
Referee: Pascal Gaüzère

27 September 2014
18:30

| Lyon | 28 – 18 | Castres |
| | Stats |

Matmut Stadium
Attendance: 10,010
Referee: Christophe Berdos

27 September 2014
18:30

| (BP) Stade Français | 43 – 10 | La Rochelle |
| | Stats |

Stade Jean-Bouin
Attendance: 11,355
Referee: Cyril Lafon

27 September 2014
20:45

| Oyonnax | 8 – 19 | Clermont |
| | Stats |

Stade Charles-Mathon
Attendance: 9,847
Referee: Cédric Marchat

=== Round 8 ===
3 October 2014
20:45

| (BP) Oyonnax | 18 – 21 | Toulon |
| | Stats |

Stade Charles-Mathon
Attendance: 9,862
Referee: Alexandre Ruiz

4 October 2014
14:45

| (BP) Bordeaux Bègles | 51 – 21 | Clermont |
| | Stats |

Stade Chaban-Delmas
Attendance: 25,513
Referee: Maxime Chalon

4 October 2014
18:30

| (BP) Bayonne | 10 – 15 | Montpellier |
| | Stats |

Stade Jean Dauger
Attendance: 12,210
Referee: Mathieu Raynal

4 October 2014
18:30

| (BP) Castres | 51 – 10 | Grenoble |
| | Stats |

Stade Pierre-Antoine
Attendance: 6,990
Referee: Laurent Cardona

4 October 2014
18:30

| (BP) La Rochelle | 29 – 8 | Lyon |
| | Stats |

Stade Marcel-Deflandre
Attendance: 14,207
Referee: Romain Poite

4 October 2014
18:30

| (BP) Racing Métro | 46 – 32 | Brive |
| | Stats |

Stade Yves-du-Manoir
Attendance: 6,390
Referee: Patrick Péchambert

4 October 2014
20:45

| Toulouse | 22 – 10 | Stade Français |
| | Stats |

Stade Ernest-Wallon
Attendance: 15,783
Referee: Jérôme Garcès

=== Round 9 ===
10 October 2014
20:45

| Grenoble | 26 – 25 | Brive (BP) |
| | Stats |

Stade des Alpes
Attendance: 13,456
Referee: Greg Garner (England)

11 October 2014
14:35

| (BP) Bordeaux Bègles | 59 – 7 | Castres |
| | Stats |

Stade Chaban-Delmas
Attendance: 25,513
Referee: Ian Davies (Wales)

11 October 2014
15:00

| Clermont | 30 – 10 | La Rochelle |
| | Stats |

Stade Marcel-Michelin
Attendance: 16,629
Referee: Giuseppe Vivarini (Italy)

11 October 2014
15:00

| Lyon | 24 – 19 | Bayonne (BP) |
| | Stats |

Matmut Stadium
Attendance: 9,780
Referee: Francisco Pastrana (Argentina)

11 October 2014
15:00

| Montpellier | 25 – 9 | Oyonnax |
| | Stats |

Altrad Stadium
Attendance: 10,997
Referee: Andrew MacMenemy (Scotland)

11 October 2014
15:00

| Stade Français | 23 – 19 | Racing Métro (BP) |
| | Stats |

Stade Jean-Bouin
Attendance: 16,588
Referee: Jaco van Heerden (South Africa)

12 October 2014
21:00

| Toulouse | 21 – 10 | Toulon |
| | Stats |

Stade Ernest-Wallon
Attendance: 18,734
Referee: John Lacey (Ireland)

=== Round 10 ===
1 November 2014
14:45

| Lyon | 17 – 41 | Toulouse (BP) |
| | Stats |

Matmut Stadium
Attendance: 11,805
Referee: Pascal Gaüzère

1 November 2014
18:30

| Brive | 21 – 15 | Castres |
| | Stats |

Stade Amédée-Domenech
Attendance: 11,932
Referee: Alexandre Ruiz

1 November 2014
18:30

| La Rochelle | 21 – 15 | Montpellier |
| | Stats |

Stade Marcel-Deflandre
Attendance: 14,718
Referee: Salem Attalah

1 November 2014
18:30

| (BP) Stade Français | 39 – 22 | Bordeaux Bègles |
| | Stats |

Stade Jean-Bouin
Attendance: 11,355
Referee: Cyril Lafon

1 November 2014
18:30

| (BP) Racing Métro | 17 – 21 | Oyonnax |
| | Stats |

Stade Yves-du-Manoir
Attendance: 6,196
Referee: Romain Poite

1 November 2014
20:45

| Bayonne | 24 – 13 | Clermont |
| | Stats |

Stade Jean Dauger
Attendance: 15,108
Referee: Jérôme Garcès

2 November 2014
13:00

| (BP) Toulon | 61 – 28 | Grenoble |
| | Stats |

Stade Mayol
Attendance: 14,818
Referee: Patrick Péchambert

=== Round 11 ===
7 November 2014
20:45

| Montpellier | 10 – 25 | Brive |
| | Stats |

Altrad Stadium
Attendance: 10,990
Referee: Cédric Marchat

8 November 2014
14:45

| Castres | 22 – 14 | Toulon |
| | Stats |

Stade Pierre-Antoine
Attendance: 8,323
Referee: Cyril Lafon

8 November 2014
20:00

| (BP) Clermont | 51 – 9 | Stade Français |
| | Stats |

Stade Marcel-Michelin
Attendance: 17,381
Referee: Maxime Chalon

8 November 2014
20:00

| Grenoble | 34 – 30 | Lyon (BP) |
| | Stats |

Stade des Alpes
Attendance: 16,327
Referee: Salem Attalah

8 November 2014
20:00

| (BP) Oyonnax | 37 – 9 | La Rochelle |
| | Stats |

Stade Charles-Mathon
Attendance: 8,308
Referee: Sébastien Minery

8 November 2014
20:00

| Racing Métro | 27 – 10 | Bayonne |
| | Stats |

Stade Yves-du-Manoir
Attendance: 6,385
Referee: Laurent Cardona

8 November 2014
20:45

| (BP) Bordeaux Bègles | 20 – 21 | Toulouse |
| | Stats |

Stade Chaban-Delmas
Attendance: 33,099
Referee: Christophe Berdos

=== Round 12 ===
29 November 2014
14:45

| Toulon | 27 – 19 | Clermont |
| | Stats |

Allianz Riviera, Nice
Attendance: 30,448
Referee: Alexandre Ruiz

29 November 2014
18:30

| (BP) Castres | 9 – 14 | Racing Métro |
| | Stats |

Stade Pierre-Antoine
Attendance: 8,381
Referee: Salem Attalah

29 November 2014
18:30

| La Rochelle | 19 – 19 | Bayonne |
| | Stats |

Stade Marcel-Deflandre
Attendance: 14,682
Referee: Cédric Marchat

29 November 2014
18:30

| Lyon | 23 – 20 | Montpellier (BP) |
| | Stats |

Matmut Stadium
Attendance: 10,241
Referee: Romain Poite

29 November 2014
18:30

| Oyonnax | 28 – 23 | Bordeaux Bègles (BP) |
| | Stats |

Stade Charles-Mathon
Attendance: 8,797
Referee: Laurent Cardona

29 November 2014
20:45

| (BP) Toulouse | 22 – 25 | Grenoble |
| | Stats |

Stade Ernest-Wallon
Attendance: 15,641
Referee: Maxime Chalon

30 November 2014
12:30

| Stade Français | 20 – 17 | Brive (BP) |
| | Stats |

Stade Jean-Bouin
Attendance: 11,018
Referee: Sébastien Minery

=== Round 13 ===
19 December 2014
20:45

| Grenoble | 30 – 43 | Stade Français |
| | Stats |

Stade des Alpes
Attendance: 17,357
Referee: Christophe Berdos

20 December 2014
14:45

| Montpellier | 23 – 20 | Toulouse (BP) |
| | Stats |

Altrad Stadium
Attendance: 13,350
Referee: Pascal Gaüzère

20 December 2014
18:30

| Bayonne | 15 – 12 | Bordeaux Bègles (BP) |
| | Stats |

Stade Jean Dauger
Attendance: 15,114
Referee: Alexandre Ruiz

20 December 2014
18:30

| Brive | 19 – 6 | Oyonnax |
| | Stats |

Stade Amédée-Domenech
Attendance: 10,677
Referee: Cédric Marchat

20 December 2014
18:30

| Racing Métro | 27 – 3 | La Rochelle |
| | Stats |

Stade Yves-du-Manoir
Attendance: 6,256
Referee: Cyril Lafon

20 December 2014
18:30

| (BP) Toulon | 30 – 6 | Lyon |
| | Stats |

Stade Mayol
Attendance: 14,707
Referee: Maxime Chalon

20 December 2014
20:45

| Clermont | 19 – 10 | Castres |
| | Stats |

Stade Marcel-Michelin
Attendance: 17,368
Referee: Romain Poite

=== Round 14 ===
28 December 2014
15:05

| Toulouse | 15 – 9 | Racing Métro |
| | Stats |

Stade Ernest-Wallon
Attendance: 18,649
Referee: Alexandre Ruiz

28 December 2014
17:00

| (BP) Bordeaux Bègles | 46 – 10 | Brive |
| | Stats |

Stade Chaban-Delmas
Attendance: 28,545
Referee: Mathieu Raynal

28 December 2014
17:00

| Castres | 27 – 9 | Montpellier |
| | Stats |

Stade Pierre-Antoine
Attendance: 8,603
Referee: Patrick Péchambert

28 December 2014
17:00

| La Rochelle | 19 – 15 | Grenoble (BP) |
| | Stats |

Stade Marcel-Deflandre
Attendance: 14,153
Referee: Salem Attalah

28 December 2014
17:00

| Oyonnax | 12 – 9 | Bayonne (BP) |
| | Stats |

Stade Charles-Mathon
Attendance: 8,754
Referee: Jérôme Garcès

28 December 2014
19:00

| Lyon | 16 – 13 | Clermont (BP) |
| | Stats |

Matmut Stadium
Attendance: 11,718
Referee: Laurent Cardona

28 December 2014
21:00

| Stade Français (BP) | 30 – 6 | Toulon |
| | Stats |

Stade Jean-Bouin
Attendance: 19,146
Referee: Pascal Gaüzère

=== Round 15 ===
2 January 2015
20:45

| Lyon | 12 – 9 | Stade Français (BP) |
| | Stats |

Matmut Stadium
Attendance: 10,540
Referee: Cédric Marchat

3 January 2015
14:35

| Racing Métro | 12 – 9 | Bordeaux Bègles (BP) |
| | Stats |

Stade Yves-du-Manoir
Attendance: 6,592
Referee: Sébastien Minery

3 January 2015
15:00

| Brive | 25 – 9 | Bayonne |
| | Stats |

Stade Amédée-Domenech
Attendance: 11,168
Referee: Laurent Cardona

3 January 2015
15:00

| Castres | 30 – 15 | La Rochelle |
| | Stats |

Stade Pierre-Antoine
Attendance: 8,330
Referee: Alexandre Ruiz

3 January 2015
15:00

| (BP) Grenoble | 33 – 19 | Oyonnax |
| | Stats |

Stade des Alpes
Attendance: 13,228
Referee: Mathieu Raynal

3 January 2015
15:35

| Montpellier | 16 – 12 | Toulon (BP) |
| | Stats |

Altrad Stadium
Attendance: 14,476
Referee: Romain Poite

4 January 2015
21:00

| Clermont | 24 – 6 | Toulouse |
| | Stats |

Stade Marcel-Michelin
Attendance: 17,637
Referee: Christophe Berdos

=== Round 16 ===
9 January 2015
20:45

| (BP) Stade Français | 49 – 13 | Castres |
| | Stats |

Stade Jean-Bouin
Attendance: 8,569
Referee: Maxime Chalon

10 January 2015
14:45

| Toulon | 32 – 23 | Racing Métro |
| | Stats |

Stade Mayol
Attendance: 13,665
Referee: Jérôme Garcès

10 January 2015
18:30

| Bayonne | 23 – 22 | Lyon (BP) |
| | Stats |

Stade Jean Dauger
Attendance: 10,851
Referee: Romain Poite

10 January 2015
18:30

| Bordeaux Bègles | 34 – 16 | Grenoble |
| | Stats |

Stade André Moga
Attendance: 8,246
Referee: Cyril Lafon

10 January 2015
18:30

| Oyonnax | 20 – 13 | Montpellier |
| | Stats |

Stade Charles-Mathon
Attendance: 8,290
Referee: Christophe Berdos

10 January 2015
18:30

| Toulouse | 29 – 26 | La Rochelle (BP) |
| | Stats |

Stade Ernest-Wallon
Attendance: 12,396
Referee: Patrick Péchambert

10 January 2015
20:45

| (BP) Clermont | 44 – 20 | Brive |
| | Stats |

Stade Marcel-Michelin
Attendance: 17,345
Referee: Pascal Gaüzère

=== Round 17 ===
30 January 2015
20:45

| Toulon | 24 – 17 | Bayonne |
| | Stats |

Stade Mayol
Attendance: 12,146
Referee: Salem Attalah

31 January 2015
14:45

| Montpellier | 34 – 24 | Bordeaux Bègles |
| | Stats |

Altrad Stadium
Attendance: 10,731
Referee: Mathieu Raynal

31 January 2015
18:30

| Brive | 23 – 0 | Grenoble |
| | Stats |

Stade Amédée-Domenech
Attendance: 9,794
Referee: Christophe Berdos

31 January 2015
18:30

| La Rochelle | 16 – 12 | Clermont (BP) |
| | Stats |

Stade Marcel-Deflandre
Attendance: 14,750
Referee: Cédric Marchat

31 January 2015
18:30

| (BP) Lyon | 11 – 13 | Racing Métro |
| | Stats |

Matmut Stadium
Attendance: 9,509
Referee: Maxime Chalon

31 January 2015
18:30

| (BP) Stade Français | 13 – 15 | Oyonnax |
| | Stats |

Stade Jean-Bouin
Attendance: 10,038
Referee: Patrick Péchambert

31 January 2015
20:45

| (BP) Castres | 9 – 13 | Toulouse |
| | Stats |

Stade Pierre-Antoine
Attendance: 10,038
Referee: Cyril Lafon

=== Round 18 ===
19 February 2015
20:45

| La Rochelle | 19 – 12 | Brive |
| | Stats |

Stade Marcel-Deflandre
Attendance: 13,888
Referee: Patrick Péchambert

21 February 2015
14:45

| Bordeaux Bègles | 28 – 23 | Toulon (BP) |
| | Stats |

Stade Chaban-Delmas
Attendance: 31,376
Referee: Alexandre Ruiz

21 February 2015
18:30

| (BP) Bayonne | 23 – 6 | Stade Français |
| | Stats |

Stade Jean Dauger
Attendance: 12,413
Referee: Mathieu Raynal

21 February 2015
18:30

| Grenoble | 20 – 18 | Montpellier (BP) |
| | Stats |

Stade des Alpes
Attendance: 13,640
Referee: Jérôme Garcès

21 February 2015
18:30

| Oyonnax | 23 – 13 | Castres |
| | Stats |

Stade Charles-Mathon
Attendance: 8,504
Referee: Laurent Cardona

21 February 2015
18:30

| Toulouse | 23 – 20 | Lyon (BP) |
| | Stats |

Stade Ernest-Wallon
Attendance: 11,732
Referee: Salem Attalah

21 February 2015
20:45

| Racing Métro | 13 – 13 | Clermont |
| | Stats |

Stade Yves-du-Manoir
Attendance: 8,366
Referee: Romain Poite

=== Round 19 ===
6 March 2015
20:45

| Oyonnax | 9 – 3 | Toulouse |
| | Stats |

Stade Charles-Mathon
Attendance: 9,690
Referee: Romain Poite

7 March 2015
14:45

| (BP) Bordeaux Bègles | 22 – 23 | Stade Français |
| | Stats |

Stade Chaban-Delmas
Attendance: 32,925
Referee: Cyril Lafon

7 March 2015
18:30

| Castres | 23 – 20 | Lyon (BP) |
| | Stats |

Stade Pierre-Antoine
Attendance: 7,993
Referee: Jérôme Garcès

7 March 2015
18:30

| Clermont | 28 – 16 | Bayonne |
| | Stats |

Stade Marcel-Michelin
Attendance: 17,597
Referee: Maxime Chalon

7 March 2015
18:30

| Montpellier | 15 – 15 | La Rochelle |
| | Stats |

Altrad Stadium
Attendance: 10,692
Referee: Sébastien Minery

7 March 2015
18:45

| Racing Métro | 34 – 29 | Grenoble (BP) |
| | Stats |

Stade Océane, Le Havre
Attendance: 13,476
Referee: Laurent Cardona

7 March 2015
20:45

| (BP) Toulon | 34 – 11 | Brive |
| | Stats |

Stade Mayol
Attendance: 12,978
Referee: Cédric Marchat

=== Round 20 ===
13 March 2015
20:45

| Clermont | 31 – 23 | Bordeaux Bègles |
| | Stats |

Stade Marcel-Michelin
Attendance: 16,763
Referee: Salem Attalah

14 March 2015
14:45

| Toulouse | 18 – 13 | Montpellier (BP) |
| | Stats |

Stade Ernest-Wallon
Attendance: 14,220
Referee: Christophe Berdos

14 March 2015
18:30

| Bayonne | 21 – 19 | Castres (BP) |
| | Stats |

Stade Jean Dauger
Attendance: 11,737
Referee: Alexandre Ruiz

14 March 2015
18:30

| (BP) Brive | 36 – 12 | Racing Métro |
| | Stats |

Stade Amédée Domenech
Attendance: 11,272
Referee: Laurent Cardona

14 March 2015
18:30

| La Rochelle | 35 – 20 | Oyonnax |
| | Stats |

Stade Marcel-Deflandre
Attendance: 14,255
Referee: Maxime Chalon

14 March 2015
18:30

| Stade Français | 21 – 30 | Grenoble |
| | Stats |

Stade Jean-Bouin
Attendance: 9,883
Referee: Sébastien Minery

14 March 2015
20:45

| Lyon | 14 – 22 | Toulon |
| | Stats |

Matmut Stadium
Attendance: 11,785
Referee: Patrick Péchambert

=== Round 21 ===
27 March 2015
20:45

| Bayonne | 6 – 12 | Racing Métro |
| | Stats |

Stade Jean Dauger
Attendance: 11,894
Referee: Romain Poite

28 March 2015
14:35

| Stade Français | 40 – 26 | Clermont |
| | Stats |

Stade Jean-Bouin
Attendance: 19,677
Referee: Cédric Marchat

28 March 2015
15:00

| (BP) Bordeaux Bègles | 21 – 22 | La Rochelle |
| | Stats |

Stade Chaban-Delmas
Attendance: 30,834
Referee: Patrick Péchambert

28 March 2015
15:00

| (BP) Montpellier | 45 – 17 | Lyon |
| | Stats |

Altrad Stadium
Attendance: 11,284
Referee: Laurent Cardona

28 March 2015
15:00

| Oyonnax | 24 – 3 | Brive |
| | Stats |

Stade Charles-Mathon
Attendance: 9,094
Referee: Christophe Berdos

28 March 2015
16:35

| Toulon | 24 – 34 | Toulouse |
| | Stats |

Stade Vélodrome, Marseille
Attendance: 64,819
Referee: Cyril Lafon

28 March 2015
20:45

| (BP) Grenoble | 12 – 16 | Castres |
| | Stats |

Stade des Alpes
Attendance: 16,832
Referee: Salem Attalah

=== Round 22 ===
10 April 2015
20:45

| La Rochelle | 19 – 19 | Stade Français |
| | Stats |

Stade Marcel-Deflandre
Attendance: 14,752
Referee: Salem Attalah

11 April 2015
14:35

| Racing Métro | 24 – 24 | Montpellier |
| | Stats |

Stade Yves-du-Manoir
Attendance: 10,998
Referee: Cédric Marchat

11 April 2015
15:00

| Brive | 22 – 20 | Lyon (BP) |
| | Stats |

Stade Amédée-Domenech
Attendance: 11,190
Referee: Alexandre Ruiz

11 April 2015
15:00

| (BP) Clermont | 10 – 11 | Oyonnax |
| | Stats |

Stade Marcel-Michelin
Attendance: 17,489
Referee: Mathieu Reynal

11 April 2015
15:00

| Toulouse | 20 – 17 | Bayonne (BP) |
| | Stats |

Stade Ernest-Wallon
Attendance: 17,884
Referee: Maxime Chalon

11 April 2015
16:35

| Grenoble | 24 – 35 | Toulon |
| | Stats |

Stade des Alpes
Attendance: 18,812
Referee: Jérôme Garcès

11 April 2015
20:45

| Castres | 22 – 20 | Bordeaux Bègles (BP) |
| | Stats |

Stade Pierre-Antoine
Attendance: 9,043
Referee: Pascal Gaüzère

=== Round 23 ===
24 April 2015
20:45

| Stade Français | 12 – 21 | Toulouse |
| | Stats |

Stade Jean-Bouin
Attendance: 19,388
Referee: Alexandre Ruiz

25 April 2015
14:45

| La Rochelle | 32 – 29 | Toulon (BP) |
| | Stats |

Stade Marcel-Deflandre
Attendance: 14,805
Referee: Pascal Gaüzère

25 April 2015
18:30

| (BP) Bayonne | 42 – 33 | Grenoble |
| | Stats |

Stade Jean-Dauger
Attendance: 13,178
Referee: Vincent Blasco-Baqué

25 April 2015
18:30

| Brive | 15 – 10 | Montpellier (BP) |
| | Stats |

Stade Amédée-Domenech
Attendance: 11,777
Referee: Mathieu Raynal

25 April 2015
18:30

| Lyon | 22 – 37 | Bordeaux Bègles |
| | Stats |

Matmut Stadium
Attendance: 10,401
Referee: Cédric Marchat

25 April 2015
18:30

| Oyonnax | 21 – 16 | Racing Métro (BP) |
| | Stats |

Stade Charles-Mathon
Attendance: 9,453
Referee: Patrick Péchambert

25 April 2015
20:45

| (BP) Castres | 31 – 10 | Clermont |
| | Stats |

Stade Pierre-Antoine
Attendance: 10,448
Referee: Christophe Berdos

=== Round 24 ===
9 May 2015
14:45

| Toulon | 37 – 21 | Castres |
| | Stats |

Stade Mayol
Attendance: 15,204
Referee: Mathieu Raynal

9 May 2015
18:30

| Bordeaux Bègles | 26 – 23 | Oyonnax (BP) |
| | Stats |

Stade André Moga
Attendance: 9,403
Referee: Christophe Berdos

9 May 2015
18:30

| Lyon | 16 – 16 | La Rochelle |
| | Stats |

Matmut Stadium
Attendance: 8,914
Referee: Maxime Chalon

9 May 2015
18:30

| Montpellier | 33 – 16 | Bayonne |
| | Stats |

Altrad Stadium
Attendance: 11,904
Referee: Patrick Péchambert

9 May 2015
18:30

| (BP) Toulouse | 67 – 19 | Brive |
| | Stats |

Stade Ernest-Wallon
Attendance: 16,774
Referee: Laurent Cardona

9 May 2015
20:45

| Grenoble | 17 – 37 | Clermont (BP) |
| | Stats |

Stade des Alpes
Attendance: 17,370
Referee: Romain Poite

10 May 2015
16:15

| Racing Métro | 19 – 28 | Stade Français |
| | Stats |

Stade Yves-du-Manoir
Attendance: 12,689
Referee: Jérôme Garcès

=== Round 25 ===
15 May 2015
20:45

| Oyonnax | 28 – 10 | Lyon |
| | Stats |

Stade Charles-Mathon
Attendance: 9,860
Referee: Pascal Gaúzère

16 May 2015
14:35

| Grenoble | 32 – 11 | Toulouse |
| | Stats |

Stade des Alpes
Attendance: 18,140
Referee: Mathieu Raynal

16 May 2015
15:00

| (BP) Bordeaux Bègles | 38 – 20 | Bayonne |
| | Stats |

Stade Chaban-Delmas
Attendance: 32,583
Referee: Jérôme Garcès

16 May 2015
15:00

| (BP) Castres | 32 – 12 | Brive |
| | Stats |

Stade Pierre-Antoine
Attendance: 10,726
Referee: Romain Poite

16 May 2015
15:00

| La Rochelle | 18 – 18 | Racing Métro |
| | Stats |

Stade Marcel-Deflandre
Attendance: 14,907
Referee: Cédric Marchat

16 May 2015
16:35

| (BP) Stade Français | 35 – 21 | Montpellier |
| | Stats |

Stade Jean-Bouin
Attendance: 14,479
Referee: Christophe Berdos

17 May 2015
21:00

| Clermont | 22 – 19 | Toulon (BP) |
| | Stats |

Stade Marcel-Michelin
Attendance: 17,741
Referee: Patrick Péchambert

=== Round 26 ===
23 May 2015
16:15

| (BP) Bayonne | 45 – 12 | La Rochelle |
| | Stats |

Stade Jean-Dauger
Attendance: 17,000
Referee: Salem Attalah

23 May 2015
16:15

| (BP) Brive | 27 – 0 | Stade Français |
| | Stats |

Stade Amédée-Domenech
Attendance: 13,612
Referee: Mathieu Raynal

23 May 2015
16:15

| Lyon | 29 – 24 | Grenoble (BP) |
| | Stats |

Matmut Stadium
Attendance: 8,723
Referee: Jérôme Garcès

23 May 2015
16:15

| Montpellier | 17 – 29 | Clermont |
| | Stats |

Altrad Stadium
Attendance: 14,600
Referee: Pascal Gauzère

23 May 2015
16:15

| (BP) Racing Métro | 53 – 10 | Castres |
| | Stats |

Stade Yves-du-Manoir
Attendance: 8,833
Referee: Maxime Chalon

23 May 2015
16:15

| (BP) Toulon | 46 – 17 | Oyonnax |
| | Stats |

Stade Mayol
Attendance: 15,229
Referee: Laurent Cardona

23 May 2015
16:15

| Toulouse | 23 – 22 | Bordeaux Bègles (BP) |
| | Stats |

Stade Ernest-Wallon
Attendance: 18,836
Referee: Alexandre Ruiz

== Playoffs ==
Quarterfinals
4 | Stade Français | 38
5 | Racing Métro | 15
3 | Toulouse | 20
6 | Oyonnax | 19

Semifinals
1 | Toulon | 16
4 | Stade Français | 33
2 | Clermont | 18
3 | Toulouse | 14

Final
4 | Stade Français | 12
2 | Clermont | 6

All times are in Central European Summer Time (UTC+2).

=== Quarter-finals ===
29 May 2015
21:00

| Stade Français | 38 – 15 | Racing Métro |
| Try: Nayacalevu 8' c Penalty try 33' c Con: Steyn (2/2) 10', 34'; Pen: Steyn (8/8) 23', 42', 51', 57', 61', 70', 76', 80' | Stats | Try: Machenaud 40' c Roberts 66' m Con: Sexton (1/2) 40'; Pen: Sexton (1/1) 47' |

Stade Jean-Bouin
Attendance: 19,175
Referee: Romain Poite

30 May 2015
16:30

| Toulouse | 20 – 19 | Oyonnax |
| Try: Baille 74' m Pen: Flood (5/5) 7', 13', 29', 54', 61' | Stats | Try: Paea 39' c Con: Urdapilleta (1/1) 39'; Pen: Urdapilleta (4/4) 15', 45', 50', 69' |

Stade Ernest-Wallon
Attendance: 14,205
Referee: Jérôme Garcès

=== Semi-finals ===
5 June 2015
21:00

| Toulon | 16 – 33 | Stade Français |
| Try: Mitchell 4' c Con: Halfpenny (1/1) 5'; Pen: Halfpenny (3/3) 11', 32', 45' | Stats | Try: Lakafia 23' c Burban 38' c Arias 80' c Con: Steyn (3/3) 24', 39', 80'; Pen: Steyn (4/4) 8', 20', 57', 70' |

Stade Bordeaux-Atlantique, Bordeaux
Attendance: 40,000
Referee: Mathieu Raynal

6 June 2015
16:15

| Clermont | 18 – 14 | Toulouse |
| Pen: Parra (4/4) 5', 17', 31', 50'; James (1/1) 72'; Drop: James 75' | Stats | Try: Medard 45' m Pen: McAlister (3/5) 10', 36', 64' |

Stade Bordeaux-Atlantique, Bordeaux
Attendance: 40,000
Referee: Alexandre Ruiz

=== Final ===
13 June 2015
20.00

| Stade Français | 12 – 6 | Clermont |
| Pen: Steyn (4/6) 14' 21' 28' 80' | Stats | Pen: Parra (0/2); Lopez (1/1) 39'; James (1/2) 62' |

Stade de France, Saint-Denis
Attendance: 79,000
Referee: Pascal Gaüzère

| FB | 15 | (France) Djibril Camara | (substituted off) 66' |
| RW | 14 | (France) Julien Arias |
| OC | 13 | (Fiji) Waisea Nayacalevu | (substituted off) 79' |
| IC | 12 | (France) Jonathan Danty |
| LW | 11 | (France) Jérémy Sinzelle |
| FH | 10 | (South Africa) Morné Steyn |
| SH | 9 | (France) Julien Dupuy | (substituted off) 69' |
| N8 | 8 | (Italy) Sergio Parisse (c) |
| OF | 7 | (France) Raphaël Lakafia |
| BF | 6 | (France) Antoine Burban | (substituted off) 65' |
| RL | 5 | (France) Alexandre Flanquart |
| LL | 4 | (Australia) Hugh Pyle | (substituted off) 26' |
| TP | 3 | (France) Rabah Slimani |
| HK | 2 | (France) Rémi Bonfils | 33' to 40+1' | (substituted off) 56' |
| LP | 1 | (South Africa) Heinke van der Merwe | (substituted off) 63' |
Substitutions:
| HK | 16 | (France) Laurent Sempéré | (substituted on) 33' (substituted off) 40+1' (substituted on) 56' |
| PR | 17 | (Samoa) Sakaria Taulafo | (substituted on) 63' |
| LK | 18 | (France) Pascal Papé | (substituted on) 26' |
| N8 | 19 | (South Africa) Jono Ross | (substituted on) 65' |
| SH | 20 | (France) Jérôme Fillol | (substituted on) 69' |
| FH | 21 | (South Africa) Meyer Bosman | (substituted on) 79' |
| CE | 22 | (France) Geoffrey Doumayrou | (substituted on) 66' |
| PR | 23 | (Georgia (country)) Davit Kubriashvili |
Coach:
(Argentina) Gonzalo Quesada

| FB | 15 | (England) Nick Abendanon |
| RW | 14 | (France) Jean-Marcellin Buttin |
| OC | 13 | (France) Aurélien Rougerie |
| IC | 12 | (New Zealand) Benson Stanley | (substituted off) 69' |
| LW | 11 | (Fiji) Napolioni Nalaga |
| FH | 10 | (France) Camille Lopez | (substituted off) 51' |
| SH | 9 | (France) Morgan Parra | (substituted off) 69' |
| N8 | 8 | (New Zealand) Fritz Lee |
| OF | 7 | (Portugal) Julien Bardy | (yellow card) 14' to 24' | (substituted off) 69' |
| BF | 6 | (France) Damien Chouly (c) |
| RL | 5 | (France) Sébastien Vahaamahina |
| LL | 4 | (France) Paul Jedrasiak | (substituted off) 51' |
| TP | 3 | (Georgia (country)) Davit Zirakashvili | (substituted off) 73' |
| HK | 2 | (Australia) John Ulugia | (substituted off) 20' |
| LP | 1 | (France) Thomas Domingo | (substituted off) 73' |
Substitutions:
| HK | 16 | (France) Benjamin Kayser | (substituted on) 20' |
| PR | 17 | (France) Raphaël Chaume | (substituted on) 73' |
| LK | 18 | (France) Julien Pierre | (substituted on) 51' |
| FL | 19 | (France) Alexandre Lapandry | (substituted on) 69' |
| SH | 20 | (France) Ludovic Radosavljevic | (substituted on) 69' |
| FH | 21 | (Australia) Brock James | (substituted on) 51' |
| FB | 22 | (New Zealand) Mike Delany | (substituted on) 69' |
| PR | 23 | (France) Clément Ric | (substituted on) 73' |
Coach:
(France) Franck Azéma

== Top scorers ==
Note: Flags to the left of player names indicate national team as has been defined under World Rugby eligibility rules, or primary nationality for players who have not yet earned international senior caps. Players may hold one or more non-WR nationalities.

=== Top points scorers ===
| Rank | Player | Team | Points |
|---|---|---|---|
| 1 | (France) Jonathan Wisniewski | Grenoble | 325 |
| 2 | (Argentina) Benjamín Urdapilleta | Oyonnax | 297 |
| 3 | (France) Gaetan Germain | Brive | 278 |
| 4 | (France) Pierre Bernard | Bordeaux Bègles | 234 |
| 5 | (France) Jules Plisson | Stade Français | 183 |
| 6 | (England) Toby Flood | Toulouse | 163 |
| 7 | (France) Rory Kockott | Castres | 154 |
| 8 | (Argentina) Martín Bustos Moyano | Bayonne | 149 |
| 9 | (France) Maxime Machenaud | Racing Métro | 146 |
| 10 | (Australia) Brock James | Clermont | 136 |

=== Top try scorers ===
| Rank | Player | Team | Tries |
|---|---|---|---|
| 1 | (Samoa) David Smith | Toulon | 13 |
| 2 | (France) Julien Arias | Stade Français | 11 |
| 3 | (Fiji) Alipate Ratini | Grenoble | 10 |
| 3 | (Fiji) Metuisela Talebula | Bordeaux Bègles | 10 |
| 5 | (Australia) Blair Connor | Bordeaux Bègles | 9 |
| 5 | (Fiji) Waisea Nayacalevu | Stade Français | 9 |
| 7 | (France) Jonathan Danty | Stade Français | 8 |
| 7 | (France) Rémy Grosso | Castres | 8 |
| 7 | (Fiji) Benito Masilevu | Brive | 8 |
| 7 | (Fiji) Napolioni Nalaga | Clermont | 8 |
| 7 | (New Zealand) Joe Rokocoko | Bayonne | 8 |
| 7 | (Ivory Coast) Silvère Tian | Oyonnax | 8 |

== Attendances ==
- Attendances do not include the semi-finals or final as these are at neutral venues.

| Club | Home Games | Total | Average | Highest | Lowest | % Capacity |
|---|---|---|---|---|---|---|
| Bayonne | 13 | 174,569 | 13,428 | 17,000 | 10,851 | 79% |
| Bordeaux Bègles | 13 | 307,859 | 23,681 | 33,099 | 7,979 | 82% |
| Brive | 13 | 151,340 | 11,642 | 13,612 | 9,794 | 73% |
| Castres | 13 | 114,744 | 8,826 | 12,084 | 6,846 | 74% |
| Clermont | 13 | 221,881 | 17,068 | 17,741 | 15,934 | 95% |
| Grenoble | 13 | 195,562 | 15,043 | 18,812 | 11,427 | 81% |
| La Rochelle | 13 | 188,684 | 14,514 | 14,907 | 13,888 | 97% |
| Lyon | 13 | 132,797 | 10,215 | 11,805 | 8,723 | 87% |
| Montpellier | 13 | 157,476 | 12,114 | 14,600 | 10,692 | 82% |
| Oyonnax | 13 | 116,712 | 8,978 | 9,862 | 7,771 | 79% |
| Racing Metro | 13 | 110,577 | 8,506 | 13,476 | 5,756 | 57% |
| Stade Francais (Note: Stade Francais's attendance figure includes home quarter-final.) | 14 | 185,769 | 13,269 | 19,677 | 5,000 | 66% |
| Toulon | 13 | 252,026 | 19,387 | 64,819 | 12,146 | 92% |
| Toulouse (Note: Toulouse's attendance figure includes home quarter-final.) | 14 | 223,808 | 15,986 | 18,836 | 11,732 | 82% |

== See also ==
- 2014–15 Rugby Pro D2 season
