= 2013–14 Top 14 season =

French rugby union club competition

2013–14 Top 14
- Countries: France
- Date: 16 August 2013 – 31 May 2014
- Champions: Toulon (4th title)
- Runners-up: Castres
- Relegated: Biarritz, Perpignan
- Matches played: 187
- Attendance: 2,678,932 (average 14,326 per match)
- Highest attendance: 80,174 (play-offs); Toulon v Castres; 31 May 2014; 63,075 (league stage); Stade Français v Toulouse; 22 March 2014
- Lowest attendance: 6,109; Racing Métro v Grenoble; 5 October 2013
- Tries scored: 607 (average 3.2 per match)
- Top point scorer: (France) Gaëtan Germain (Brive); 299 points
- Top try scorer: (Fiji) Metuisela Talebula (Bordeaux Bègles); 15 tries

Official website
- www.lnr.fr

The 2013–14 Top 14 competition is a French domestic rugby union club competition operated by the Ligue Nationale de Rugby (LNR). Two new teams from the 2012–13 Pro D2 season were promoted to Top 14 this year, Oyonnax and Brive in place of the two relegated teams, Agen and Mont-de-Marsan. Home-and-away play began on 16 August 2013 and continued through to 3 May 2014.

The regular season was very closely fought, with a record few away wins, but ended up with the same six teams qualifying for the play-offs as the previous year. Toulon topped the table for the first time, one point clear of second-placed Montpellier, whilst defending champions Castres just managed to hold on to the last qualifying spot, finishing in sixth. At the other end of the table, Biarritz had a nightmarish season, spending virtually the whole year in the relegation zone, and finished bottom, while Perpignan, who had been in the top tier of French rugby since 1911, were also relegated. Oyonnax and Brive finished 12th and 9th, respectively, marking the first time since 2007 that both newly promoted teams managed to keep their places in the Top 14.

The quarter-final stage saw two major upsets, with Racing Métro avenging their loss from the previous year with a 21–16 away win at Toulouse, whose run of twenty consecutive semi-final appearances thus came to end, while Castres put an end to Clermont's record streak of 77 straight wins at Stade Marcel-Michelin with a 22–16 win. This is the first time that both quarterfinals have resulted in away wins.

== Teams ==
Locations of the 2013–14 Top 14 teams

Club	City (department)	Stadium	Capacity
Bayonne	Bayonne (Pyrénées-Atlantiques)	Stade Jean Dauger (Note: Bayonne took one match across the Spanish border to Estadio Anoeta in Donostia-San Sebastián in 2012–13, and is doing so again in 2013–14.)	16,934
Biarritz	Biarritz (Pyrénées-Atlantiques)	Parc des Sports Aguiléra (Note: Biarritz has historically taken at least one home match per season to the Anoeta, but has not done so since the 2010–11 season.)	15,000
Bordeaux Bègles	Bordeaux (Gironde)	Stade Chaban-Delmas (Bordeaux); Stade André Moga (Bègles) (Note: In 2012–13, Bordeaux Bègles played eight of their 13 home matches at the larger Stade Chaban-Delmas and only five at their traditional home of Stade André-Moga. They intend to do the same in 2013–14.)	34,700; 10,000
Brive	Brive-la-Gaillarde (Corrèze)	Stade Amédée-Domenech	16,300
Castres	Castres (Tarn)	Stade Pierre-Antoine	11,500
Clermont	Clermont-Ferrand (Puy-de-Dôme)	Stade Marcel-Michelin	18,030
Grenoble	Grenoble (Isère)	Stade Lesdiguières (Note: In 2012–13, Grenoble played four home matches at the city's largest venue, Stade des Alpes. In 2013–14, they intend to play five matches there.)	12,000
Montpellier	Montpellier (Hérault)	Stade Yves-du-Manoir	14,700
Oyonnax	Oyonnax (Ain)	Stade Charles-Mathon	11,400
Perpignan	Perpignan (Pyrénées-Orientales)	Stade Aimé Giral (Note: In 2012–13, Perpignan played one home match at Estadi Olímpic Lluís Companys in Montjuïc, Barcelona.)	14,593
Racing Métro 92	Colombes (Hauts-de-Seine)	Stade Olympique Yves-du-Manoir (Note: Racing took two 2012–13 home matches to Stade de France. For 2013–14, they are doing the same, and have additionally taken home matches to Stade Marcel-Deflandre in La Rochelle and Stade de la Beaujoire in Nantes.)	14,000
Stade Français	Paris, 16th arrondissement	Stade Jean-Bouin (Note: Stade Français returned to their traditional home, Stade Jean-Bouin, for the 2013–14 season. The club will take at least one home Top 14 match to Stade de France; their Round 10 match at Stade de France was a home match for their opponent, Racing Métro.)	20,000
Toulon	Toulon (Var)	Stade Mayol (Note: Toulon took one home match to Stade Vélodrome in Marseille in 2012–13, resuming a past practice that they skipped in 2011–12. They will do likewise in 2013–14, and they took one home match to Allianz Riviera in Nice.)	15,250
Toulouse	Toulouse (Haute-Garonne)	Stade Ernest-Wallon (Note: Toulouse often takes high-demand home matches to the city's largest sporting venue, Stadium Municipal. Two of their 2012–13 home matches were played there, but they have no confirmed plans to do so in 2013–14.)	19,500

== Competition format ==
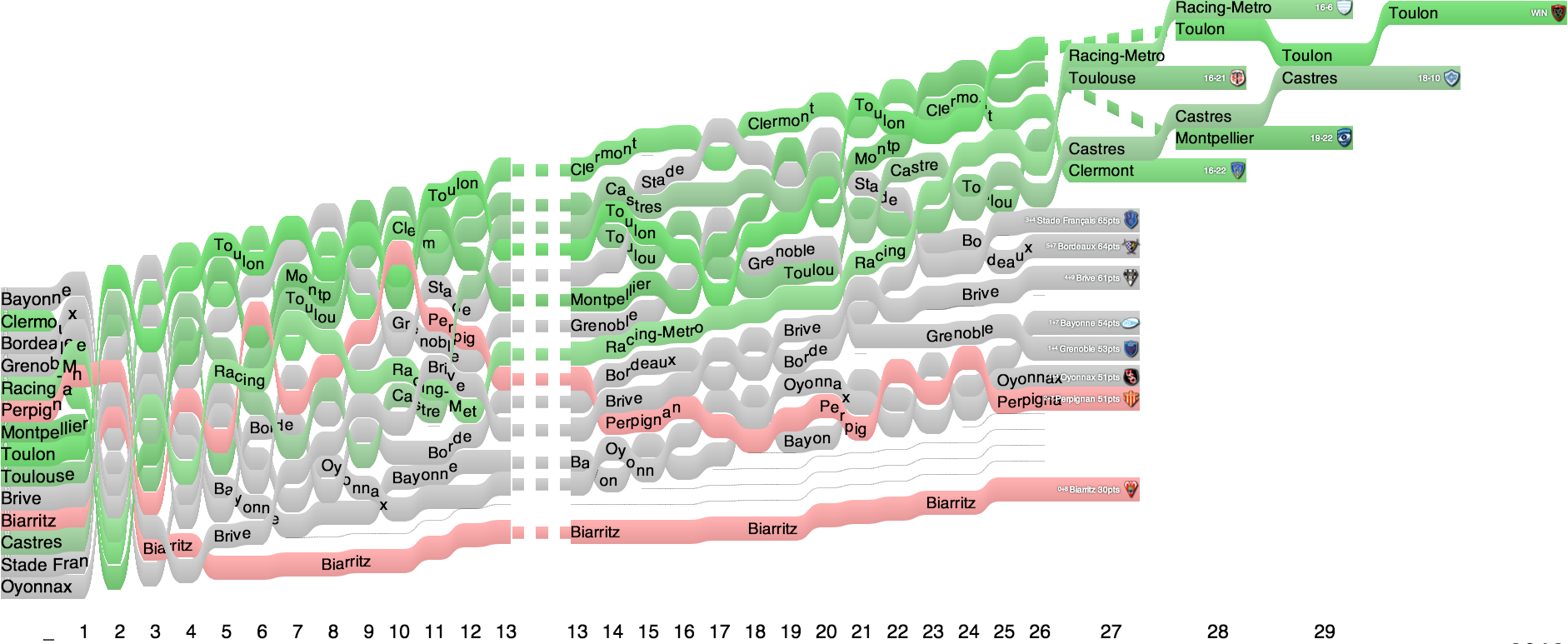
Gap Chart Top14 2013-2014

The top six teams at the end of the regular season (after all the teams played one another twice, once at home, once away) enter a knockout stage to decide the Champions of France. This consists of three rounds: the teams finishing third to sixth in the table play quarter-finals (hosted by the third and fourth placed teams). The winners then face the top two teams in the semi-finals, with the winners meeting in the final at Stade de France.

The LNR uses a slightly different bonus points system from that used in most other rugby competitions. It trialled a new system in 2007–08 explicitly designed to prevent a losing team from earning more than one bonus point in a match, a system that also made it impossible for either team to earn a bonus point in a drawn match. LNR chose to continue with this system for subsequent seasons.

France's bonus point system operates as follows:

- 4 points for a win.
- 2 points for a draw.
- 1 bonus point for winning while scoring at least 3 more tries than the opponent. This replaces the standard bonus point for scoring 4 tries regardless of the match result.
- 1 bonus point for losing by 7 points (or less).

== Table ==
2013–14 Top 14 table
Pos	Team	Pld	W	D	L	PF	PA	PD	TB	LB	Pts	Qualification
1	Toulon (CH)	26	16	1	9	660	466	+194	5	6	77	Semi-final play-off place and berth in the Champions Cup
2	Montpellier (SF)	26	15	1	10	670	525	+145	7	7	76	Semi-final play-off place and berth in the Champions Cup
3	Clermont Auvergne (QF)	26	15	1	10	659	500	+159	6	5	73	Home quarter-final play-off place and berth in the Champions Cup
4	Toulouse (QF)	26	13	2	11	548	442	+106	7	6	69 (Note: Toulouse won the head-to-head matches with Racing Métro 5 – 4 on match points so rank higher.)	Home quarter-final play-off place and berth in the Champions Cup
5	Racing Métro (SF)	26	15	2	9	459	448	+11	1	4	69	Away quarter-final play-off place and berth in the Champions Cup
6	Castres Olympique (RU)	26	13	2	11	567	488	+79	6	4	66	Away quarter-final play-off place and berth in the Champions Cup
7	Stade Français	26	14	1	11	529	496	+33	3	4	65	Play-off for a place in the Champions cup (Note: Advances to a play-off against the seventh-place team from the English Premiership for a place in the Champions Cup.)
8	Bordeaux Bègles	26	13	0	13	629	573	+56	5	7	64	
9	Brive	26	11	2	13	473	476	−3	4	9	61	
10	Bayonne	26	11	1	14	424	549	−125	1	7	54	
11	Grenoble	26	11	2	13	465	625	−160	1	4	53	
12	Oyonnax	26	11	1	14	456	562	−106	1	4	51 (Note: Oyonnax and Perpignan each gained 4 match points from their head-to-head games; Oyonnax won 34 – 31 on aggregate points so rank higher.)	
13	Perpignan (R)	26	10	1	15	486	593	−107	2	7	51	Relegated to Rugby Pro D2
14	Biarritz Olympique (R)	26	5	1	20	374	656	−282	0	8	30	Relegated to Rugby Pro D2

Updated to match(es) played on 31 May 2014. Source: ESPN Scrum
Rules for classification: If teams are level at any stage, tiebreakers are applied in the following order:
1. Competition points earned in head-to-head matches
2. Points difference in head-to-head matches
3. Try differential in head-to-head matches
4. Points difference in all matches
5. Try differential in all matches
6. Points scored in all matches
7. Tries scored in all matches
8. Fewer matches forfeited
9. Classification in the previous Top 14 season
  Notes:

== Relegation ==
Normally, the teams that finish in 13th and 14th places in the table are relegated to Pro D2 at the end of the season. In certain circumstances, "financial reasons" may cause a higher placed team to be demoted instead. This last happened at the end of the 2009–10 season when 12th place Montauban were relegated thereby reprieving 13th place Bayonne.

== Fixtures & Results ==
After the General Assembly of the Ligue Nationale de Rugby, held at Aix-en-Provence on 5 and 6 July 2013, the outline calendar of fixtures for the 2013–14 season were released. Detailed fixtures information evolves as the season progresses (i.e. specific kick off times). Match attendances are from the official web site (Affluences).

=== Round 1 ===
17 August 2013
18:30

Bayonne	39 – 11	Oyonnax
	Stats

Stade Jean Dauger
Attendance: 15,135
Referee: Alexandre Ruiz

17 August 2013
15:00

Biarritz Olympique	18 – 22	Clermont
	Stats

Parc des Sports Aguiléra
Attendance: 13,400
Referee: Romain Poite

17 August 2013
18:30

Bordeaux Bègles	31 – 25	Toulouse
	Stats

Stade Chaban-Delmas
Attendance: 23,340
Referee: Laurent Cardona

17 August 2013
18:30

Grenoble	19 – 16	Stade Français
	Stats

Stade Lesdiguières
Attendance: 8,331
Referee: Patrick Pechambert

16 August 2013
20:45

Montpellier	22 – 22	Toulon
	Stats

Stade Yves-du-Manoir
Attendance: 15,268
Referee: Cedric Marchat

17 August 2013
20:35

Perpignan	26 – 23	Castres Olympique
	Stats

Stade Aimé Giral
Attendance: 13,784
Referee: Jérôme Garcès

17 August 2013
18:30

Racing Métro	19 – 14	Brive
	Stats

Stade Marcel-Deflandre, La Rochelle
Attendance: 6,676
Referee: Salem Attalah

=== Round 2 ===
24 August 2013
18:30

Biarritz Olympique	19 – 12	Montpellier
	Stats

Parc des Sports Aguiléra
Attendance: 11,687
Referee: Jérôme Garcès

24 August 2013
20:35

Brive	25 – 12	Bordeaux Bègles
	Stats

Stade Amédée-Domenech
Attendance: 10,213
Referee: Sebastien Minery

24 August 2013
18:30

Castres Olympique	34 – 6	Grenoble
	Stats

Stade Pierre-Antoine
Attendance: 7,983
Referee: Cyril Lafon

24 August 2013
15:00

Oyonnax	30 – 19	Clermont
	Stats

Stade Charles-Mathon
Attendance: 8,507
Referee: Laurent Cardona

24 August 2013
18:30

Perpignan	27 – 28	Stade Français
	Stats

Stade Aimé Giral
Attendance: 12,560
Referee: Alexandre Ruiz

23 August 2013
20:50

Toulon	41 – 14	Racing Métro
	Stats

Stade Mayol
Attendance: 15,102
Referee: Romain Poite

24 August 2013
18:30

Toulouse	40 – 3	Bayonne
	Stats

Stade Ernest-Wallon
Attendance: 16,529
Referee: Salem Attalah

=== Round 3 ===
31 August 2013
20:30

Bayonne	31 – 20	Perpignan
	Stats

Stade Jean Dauger
Attendance: 13,356
Referee: Sebastien Minery

31 August 2013
18:30

Bordeaux Bègles	21 – 20	Castres Olympique
	Stats

Stade Chaban-Delmas
Attendance: 17,067
Referee: Christophe Berdos

31 August 2013
15:00

Clermont	38 – 19	Toulouse
	Stats

Stade Marcel-Michelin
Attendance: 17,656
Referee: Alexandre Ruiz

31 August 2013
20:35

Grenoble	28 – 26	Toulon
	Stats

Stade des Alpes
Attendance: 16,440
Referee: Salem Attalah

31 August 2013
18:30

Montpellier	33 – 24	Brive
	Stats

Stade Yves-du-Manoir
Attendance: 10,315
Referee: Romain Poite

30 August 2013
20:50

Stade Français	38 – 3	Biarritz Olympique
	Stats

Stade Jean-Bouin
Attendance: 19,188
Referee: Pascal Gaüzère

31 August 2013
18:30

Racing Métro	22 – 9	Oyonnax
	Stats

Stade Olympique Yves-du-Manoir
Attendance: 6,601
Referee: Cedric Marchat

=== Round 4 ===
4 September 2013
19:00

Bordeaux Bègles	29 – 36	Montpellier
	Stats

Stade André Moga
Attendance: 7,471
Referee: Cyril Lafon

4 September 2013
18:45

Castres Olympique	38 – 10	Stade Français
	Stats

Stade Pierre-Antoine
Attendance: 8,033
Referee: Sebastien Minery

4 September 2013
19:00

Clermont	55 – 0	Bayonne
	Stats

Stade Marcel-Michelin
Attendance: 17,264
Referee: Cedric Marchat

4 September 2013
19:00

Oyonnax	24 – 22	Biarritz Olympique
	Stats

Stade Charles-Mathon
Attendance: 7,294
Referee: Patrick Pechambert

4 September 2013
19:00

Perpignan	36 – 13	Grenoble
	Stats

Stade Aimé Giral
Attendance: 9,477
Referee: Pascal Gaüzère

4 September 2013
19:00

Toulon	62 – 12	Brive
	Stats

Stade Mayol
Attendance: 14,660
Referee: Laurent Cardona

4 September 2013
21:05

Toulouse	30 – 6	Racing Métro
	Stats

Stade Ernest-Wallon
Attendance: 15,581
Referee: Christophe Berdos

=== Round 5 ===
8 September 2013
18:00

Biarritz Olympique	13 – 24	Toulon
	Stats

Parc des Sports Aguiléra
Attendance: 11,234
Referee: Sebastien Minery

8 September 2013
18:00

Brive	17 – 10	Bayonne
	Stats

Stade Amédée-Domenech
Attendance: 9,763
Referee: Patrick Pechambert

8 September 2013
18:00

Grenoble	21 – 14	Bordeaux Bègles
	Stats

Stade Lesdiguières
Attendance: 7,368
Referee: Cedric Marchat

8 September 2013
15:30

Montpellier	25 – 0	Toulouse
	Stats

Stade Yves-du-Manoir
Attendance: 13,436
Referee: Pascal Gaüzère

8 September 2013
18:00

Oyonnax	19 – 9	Castres Olympique
	Stats

Stade Charles-Mathon
Attendance: 7,803
Referee: Alexandre Ruiz

8 September 2013
21:00

Stade Français	23 – 16	Clermont
	Stats

Stade Jean-Bouin
Attendance: 15,535
Referee: Christophe Berdos

8 September 2013
18:00

Racing Métro	19 – 16	Perpignan
	Stats

Stade Olympique Yves-du-Manoir
Attendance: 6,824
Referee: Cyril Lafon

=== Round 6 ===
14 September 2013
20:35

Bayonne	16 – 19	Racing Métro
	Stats

Stade Jean Dauger
Attendance: 11,634
Referee: Laurent Cardona

14 September 2013
18:30

Bordeaux Bègles	35 – 10	Oyonnax
	Stats

Stade André Moga
Attendance: 6,534
Referee: Sebastien Cloute

14 September 2013
14:55

Castres Olympique	22 – 15	Toulon
	Stats

Stade Pierre-Antoine
Attendance: 9,168
Referee: Pascal Gaüzère

14 September 2013
18:30

Clermont	27 – 13	Grenoble
	Stats

Stade Marcel-Michelin
Attendance: 15,775
Referee: Patrick Pechambert

14 September 2013
18:30

Stade Français	25 – 18	Brive
	Stats

Stade Jean-Bouin
Attendance: 11,173
Referee: Cedric Marchat

13 September 2013
18:45

Perpignan	28 – 16	Montpellier
	Stats

Stade Aimé Giral
Attendance: 10,628
Referee: Christophe Berdos

14 September 2013
18:30

Toulouse	31 – 7	Biarritz Olympique
	Stats

Stade Ernest-Wallon
Attendance: 13,503
Referee: Cyril Lafon

=== Round 7 ===
21 September 2013
18:30

Biarritz Olympique	21 – 27	Grenoble
	Stats

Parc des Sports Aguiléra
Attendance: 9,833
Referee: Sebastien Cloute

21 September 2013
18:30

Brive	31 – 6	Perpignan
	Stats

Stade Amédée-Domenech
Attendance: 10,052
Referee: Sebastien Minery

20 September 2013
20:45

Montpellier	43 – 3	Clermont
	Stats

Stade Yves-du-Manoir
Attendance: 14,088
Referee: Salem Attalah

21 September 2013
20:35

Oyonnax	15 – 16	Stade Français
	Stats

Stade Charles-Mathon
Attendance: 8,244
Referee: Pascal Gaüzère

21 September 2013
18:30

Racing Métro	26 – 19	Bordeaux Bègles
	Stats

Stade Olympique Yves-du-Manoir
Attendance: 6,920
Referee: Patrick Pechambert

21 September 2013
18:30

Toulon	18 – 12	Bayonne
	Stats

Stade Mayol
Attendance: 14,257
Referee: Alexandre Ruiz

21 September 2013
15:00

Toulouse	26 – 9	Castres Olympique
	Stats

Stade Ernest-Wallon
Attendance: 16,430
Referee: Romain Poite

=== Round 8 ===
28 September 2013
18:30

Bayonne	27 – 19	Biarritz Olympique
	Stats

Stade Jean Dauger
Attendance: 16,933
Referee: Christophe Berdos

28 September 2013
18:30

Castres Olympique	19 – 15	Racing Métro
	Stats

Stade Pierre-Antoine
Attendance: 7,596
Referee: Sebastien Cloute

29 September 2013
12:30

Clermont	40 – 11	Bordeaux Bègles
	Stats

Stade Marcel-Michelin
Attendance: 15,036
Referee: Laurent Cardona

28 September 2013
18:30

Grenoble	12 – 12	Brive
	Stats

Stade Lesdiguières
Attendance: 8,526
Referee: Alexandre Ruiz

28 September 2013
14:55

Oyonnax	25 – 22	Toulon
	Stats

Stade Charles-Mathon
Attendance: 11,299
Referee: Romain Poite

27 September 2013
20:45

Stade Français	18 – 11	Montpellier
	Stats

Stade Jean-Bouin
Attendance: 15,291
Referee: Cyril Lafon

28 September 2013
20:35

Perpignan	20 – 16	Toulouse
	Stats

Stade Aimé Giral
Attendance: 12,258
Referee: Patrick Pechambert

=== Round 9 ===
4 October 2013
20:45

Biarritz Olympique	12 – 16	Perpignan
	Stats

Parc des Sports Aguiléra
Attendance: 8,975
Referee: Dudley Phillips (IRFU)

5 October 2013
18:30

Bordeaux Bègles	34 – 6	Bayonne
	Stats

Stade André Moga
Attendance: 9,329
Referee: Ian Davies (WRU)

5 October 2013
18:30

Brive	34 – 0	Castres Olympique
	Stats

Stade Amédée-Domenech
Attendance: 11,116
Referee: Andrew McMenemy (SRU)

5 October 2013
18:30

Montpellier	45 – 20	Oyonnax
	Stats

Stade Yves-du-Manoir
Attendance: 11,563
Referee: Claudio Blessano (FIR)

5 October 2013
18:30

Racing Métro	20 – 22	Grenoble
	Stats

Stade Olympique Yves-du-Manoir
Attendance: 6,109
Referee: David Wilkinson (IRFU)

5 October 2013
14:55

Toulon	25 – 19	Clermont
	Stats

Allianz Riviera, Nice
Attendance: 33,996
Referee: Jérôme Garcès

5 October 2013
20:40

Toulouse	28 – 10	Stade Français
	Stats

Stade Ernest-Wallon
Attendance: 16,130
Referee: Marius Mitrea (FIR)

=== Round 10 ===
25 October 2013
20:45

Bayonne	24 – 19	Montpellier
	Stats

Stade Jean Dauger
Attendance: 11,450
Referee: Pascal Gaüzère

26 October 2013
18:30

Castres Olympique	39 – 0	Biarritz Olympique
	Stats

Stade Pierre-Antoine
Attendance: 8,034
Referee: Cyril Lafon

26 October 2013
18:30

Clermont	36 – 29	Brive
	Stats

Stade Marcel-Michelin
Attendance: 17,707
Referee: Romain Poite

26 October 2013
18:30

Grenoble	23 – 10	Oyonnax
	Stats

Stade Lesdiguières
Attendance: 10,501
Referee: Patrick Pechambert

26 October 2013
18:30

Perpignan	31 – 20	Bordeaux Bègles
	Stats

Stade Aimé Giral
Attendance: 10,136
Referee: Cedric Marchat

26 October 2013
20:35

Racing Métro	16 – 12	Stade Français
	Stats

Stade de France
Attendance: 25,673
Referee: Christophe Berdos

26 October 2013
14:55

Toulouse	13 – 12	Toulon
	Stats

Stade Ernest-Wallon
Attendance: 18,838
Referee: Alexandre Ruiz

=== Round 11 ===
2 November 2013
18:30

Biarritz Olympique	9 – 6	Racing Métro
	Stats

Parc des Sports Aguiléra
Attendance: 9,867
Referee: Salem Attalah

2 November 2013
14:55

Brive	25 – 13	Toulouse
	Stats

Stade Amédée-Domenech
Attendance: 13,979
Referee: Pascal Gaüzère

1 November 2013
21:00

Castres Olympique	22 – 22	Clermont
	Stats

Stade Pierre-Antoine
Attendance: 9,843
Referee: Laurent Cardona

2 November 2013
18:30

Montpellier	25 – 18	Grenoble
	Stats

Stade Yves-du-Manoir
Attendance: 11,451
Referee: Sebastien Cloute

2 November 2013
18:30

Oyonnax	22 – 9	Perpignan
	Stats

Stade Charles-Mathon
Attendance: 8,930
Referee: Jérôme Garcès

2 November 2013
20:30

Stade Français	13 – 9	Bayonne
	Stats

Stade Jean-Bouin
Attendance: 11,002
Referee: Alexandre Ruiz

1 November 2013
19:00

Toulon	37 – 17	Bordeaux Bègles
	Stats

Stade Mayol
Attendance: 15,057
Referee: Sebastien Minery

=== Round 12 ===
23 November 2013
14:15

Bayonne	24 – 21	Grenoble
	Stats

Stade Jean Dauger
Attendance: 10,008
Referee: Cedric Marchat

23 November 2013
14:15

Bordeaux Bègles	45 – 23	Stade Français
	Stats

Stade Chaban-Delmas
Attendance: 23,794
Referee: Salem Attalah

23 November 2013
14:15

Brive	9 – 14	Biarritz Olympique
	Stats

Stade Amédée-Domenech
Attendance: 10,182
Referee: Patrick Pechambert

23 November 2013
14:30

Clermont	47 – 14	Racing Métro
	Stats

Stade Marcel-Michelin
Attendance: 16,192
Referee: Cyril Lafon

23 November 2013
14:15

Montpellier	16 – 20	Castres Olympique
	Stats

Stade Yves-du-Manoir
Attendance: 13,703
Referee: Christophe Berdos

22 November 2013
20:45

Toulon	15 – 9	Perpignan
	Stats

Stade Mayol
Attendance: 13,965
Referee: Sebastien Cloute

23 November 2013
14:15

Toulouse	14 – 3	Oyonnax
	Stats

Stade Ernest-Wallon
Attendance: 13,234
Referee: Sebastien Minery

=== Round 13 ===
30 November 2013
18:30

Biarritz Olympique	15 – 22	Bordeaux Bègles
	Stats

Parc des Sports Aguiléra
Attendance: 9,200
Referee: Cyril Lafon

30 November 2013
18:30

Castres Olympique	46 – 16	Bayonne
	Stats

Stade Pierre-Antoine
Attendance: 7,447
Referee: Jérôme Garcès

30 November 2013
20:35

Grenoble	25 – 18	Toulouse
	Stats

Stade des Alpes
Attendance: 19,778
Referee: Romain Poite

30 November 2013
18:30

Oyonnax	26 – 9	Brive
	Stats

Stade Charles-Mathon
Attendance: 7,650
Referee: Sebastien Cloute

30 November 2013
14:55

Stade Français	23 – 0	Toulon
	Stats

Stade Jean-Bouin
Attendance: 19,476
Referee: Cedric Marchat

29 November 2013
20:45

Perpignan	23 – 30	Clermont
	Stats

Stade Aimé Giral
Attendance: 10,835
Referee: Sebastien Minery

30 November 2013
18:30

Racing Métro	17 – 12	Montpellier
	Stats

Stade Olympique Yves-du-Manoir
Attendance: 7,283
Referee: Patrick Pechambert

=== Round 14 ===
21 December 2013
18:30

Brive	9 – 9	Racing Métro
	Stats

Stade Amédée-Domenech
Attendance: 10,450
Referee: Salem Attalah

21 December 2013
18:30

Castres Olympique	37 – 13	Perpignan
	Stats

Stade Pierre-Antoine
Attendance: 8,387
Referee: Pascal Gaüzère

21 December 2013
18:30

Clermont	35 – 6	Biarritz Olympique
	Stats

Stade Marcel-Michelin
Attendance: 16,193
Referee: Sebastien Cloute

21 December 2013
18:30

Oyonnax	9 – 6	Bayonne
	Stats

Stade Charles-Mathon
Attendance: 8,267
Referee: Romain Poite

20 December 2013
20:45

Stade Français	21 – 6	Grenoble
	Stats

Stade Jean-Bouin
Attendance: 7,483
Referee: Christophe Berdos

21 December 2013
14:55

Toulon	43 – 10	Montpellier
	Stats

Stade Mayol
Attendance: 14,499
Referee: Sebastien Minery

21 December 2013
20:35

Toulouse	18 – 16	Bordeaux Bègles
	Stats

Stade Ernest-Wallon
Attendance: 13,269
Referee: Alexandre Ruiz

=== Round 15 ===
29 December 2013
19:00

Bayonne	21 – 13	Toulouse
	Stats

Stade Jean Dauger
Attendance: 16,242
Referee: Sebastien Cloute

29 December 2013
17:00

Bordeaux Bègles	27 – 23	Brive
	Stats

Stade Chaban-Delmas
Attendance: 28,615
Referee: Christophe Berdos

29 December 2013
17:00

Clermont	33 – 19	Oyonnax
	Stats

Stade Marcel-Michelin
Attendance: 17,655
Referee: Patrick Pechambert

29 December 2013
17:00

Grenoble	20 – 16	Castres Olympique
	Stats

Stade des Alpes
Attendance: 18,514
Referee: Salem Attalah

29 December 2013
17:00

Montpellier	48 – 22	Biarritz Olympique
	Stats

Stade Yves-du-Manoir
Attendance: 12,016
Referee: Laurent Cardona

29 December 2013
15:00

Stade Français	19 – 12	Perpignan
	Stats

Stade Jean-Bouin
Attendance: 12,376
Referee: Cyril Lafon

29 December 2013
21:00

Racing Métro	14 – 3	Toulon
	Stats

Stade Yves-du-Manoir
Attendance: 12,091
Referee: Alexandre Ruiz

=== Round 16 ===
4 January 2014
18:30

Biarritz Olympique	6 – 18	Stade Français
	Stats

Parc des Sports Aguiléra
Attendance: 8,139
Referee: Pascal Gaüzère

4 January 2014
20:35

Brive	15 – 9	Montpellier
	Stats

Stade Amédée-Domenech
Attendance: 9,324
Referee: Cedric Marchat

3 January 2014
20:45

Castres Olympique	15 – 9	Bordeaux Bègles
	Stats

Stade Pierre-Antoine
Attendance: 7,404
Referee: Romain Poite

4 January 2014
18:30

Oyonnax	6 – 0	Racing Métro
	Stats

Stade Charles-Mathon
Attendance: 8,080
Referee: Jérôme Garcès

4 January 2014
18:30

Perpignan	20 – 8	Bayonne
	Stats

Stade Aimé Giral
Attendance: 10,382
Referee: Patrick Pechambert

4 January 2014
14:55

Toulon	21 – 22	Grenoble
	Stats

Stade Mayol
Attendance: 13,502
Referee: Laurent Cardona

5 January 2014
20:45

Toulouse	19 – 12	Clermont
	Stats

Stade Ernest-Wallon
Attendance: 18,283
Referee: Christophe Berdos

=== Round 17 ===
25 January 2014
18:30

Bayonne	18 – 9	Clermont
	Stats

Stade Jean Dauger
Attendance: 11,697
Referee: Salem Attalah

25 January 2014
18:30

Biarritz Olympique	P – P	Oyonnax

Parc des Sports Aguiléra
Referee: Sebastien Cloute

- This match was postponed due to heavy rain. Despite the pitch being covered since Friday, the referee took the decision to cancel the match. It has been rescheduled to 14 March.

25 January 2014
20:35

Brive	23 – 10	Toulon
	Stats

Stade Amédée-Domenech
Attendance: 12,876
Referee: Sebastien Minery

25 January 2014
18:30

Grenoble	25 – 19	Perpignan
	Stats

Stade Lesdiguières
Attendance: 8,906
Referee: Alexandre Ruiz

25 January 2014
18:30

Montpellier	28 – 23	Bordeaux Bègles
	Stats

Stade Yves-du-Manoir
Attendance: 9,896
Referee: Patrick Pechambert

24 January 2014
20:45

Stade Français	32 – 6	Castres Olympique
	Stats

Stade Jean-Bouin
Attendance: 10,147
Referee: Laurent Cardona

25 January 2014
14:55

Racing Métro	25 – 5	Toulouse
	Stats

Stade de France
Attendance: 35,342
Referee: Cyril Lafon

=== Round 18 ===
8 February 2014
18:30

Bayonne	9 – 6	Brive
	Stats

Stade Jean Dauger
Attendance: 10,117
Referee: Romain Poite

7 February 2014
20:45

Bordeaux Bègles	38 – 17	Grenoble
	Stats

Stade André Moga
Attendance: 6,773
Referee: Cyril Lafon

8 February 2014
18:30

Castres Olympique	17 – 16	Oyonnax
	Stats

Stade Pierre-Antoine
Attendance: 7,793
Referee: Sebastien Minery

8 February 2014
14:30

Clermont	25 – 13	Stade Français
	Stats

Stade Marcel-Michelin
Attendance: 17,589
Referee: Sebastien Cloute

8 February 2014
18:30

Perpignan	19 – 19	Racing Métro
	Stats

Stade Aimé Giral
Attendance: 9,752
Referee: Christophe Berdos

8 February 2014
18:30

Toulon	33 – 20	Biarritz Olympique
	Stats

Stade Mayol
Attendance: 12,330
Referee: Salem Attalah

8 February 2014
20:35

Toulouse	12 – 15	Montpellier
	Stats

Stade Ernest-Wallon
Attendance: 15,901
Referee: Mathieu Raynal

=== Round 19 ===
15 February 2014
18:30

Biarritz Olympique	6 – 16	Toulouse
	Stats

Parc des Sports Aguiléra
Attendance: 10,123
Referee: Jérôme Garcès

15 February 2014
20:35

Brive	28 – 12	Stade Français
	Stats

Stade Amédée-Domenech
Attendance: 10,934
Referee: Mathieu Raynal

14 February 2014
20:35

Grenoble	16 – 13	Clermont
	Stats

Stade des Alpes
Attendance: 19,674
Referee: Laurent Cardona

15 February 2014
18:30

Montpellier	50 – 19	Perpignan
	Stats

Stade Yves-du-Manoir
Attendance: 12,468
Referee: Pascal Gaüzère

15 February 2014
18:30

Oyonnax	P – P	Bordeaux Bègles

Stade Charles-Mathon
Referee: Alexandre Ruiz

- This match was postponed due to a waterlogged pitch. It has been rescheduled to 5 April.

15 February 2014
18:30

Racing Métro	18 – 8	Bayonne
	Stats

Stade Olympique Yves-du-Manoir
Attendance: 7,066
Referee: Cedric Marchat

15 February 2014
14:55

Toulon	19 – 13	Castres Olympique
	Stats

Stade Mayol
Attendance: 14,200
Referee: Romain Poite

=== Round 20 ===
23 February 2014
17:05

Bayonne	9 – 15	Toulon
	Stats

Stade Jean Dauger
Attendance: 13,253
Referee: Pascal Gaüzère

22 February 2014
18:30

Bordeaux Bègles	25 – 9	Racing Métro
	Stats

Stade André Moga
Attendance: 7,270
Referee: Salem Attalah

22 February 2014
20:35

Castres Olympique	29 – 27	Toulouse
	Stats

Stade Pierre-Antoine
Attendance: 9,908
Referee: Cyril Lafon

22 February 2014
14:30

Clermont	42 – 16	Montpellier
	Stats

Stade Marcel-Michelin
Attendance: 17,609
Referee: Sebastien Minery

22 February 2014
18:30

Grenoble	20 – 22	Biarritz Olympique
	Stats

Stade Lesdiguières
Attendance: 7,862
Referee: Patrick Pechambert

22 February 2014
18:30

Stade Français	29 – 26	Oyonnax
	Stats

Stade Jean-Bouin
Attendance: 8,152
Referee: Christophe Berdos

22 February 2014
18:30

Perpignan	12 – 6	Brive
	Stats

Stade Aimé Giral
Attendance: 9,603
Referee: Sebastien Cloute

=== Round 21 ===
2 March 2014
15:00

Biarritz Olympique	8 – 11	Bayonne
	Stats

Parc des Sports Aguiléra
Attendance: 12,987
Referee: Mathieu Raynal

1 March 2014
14:55

Bordeaux Bègles	26 – 16	Clermont
	Stats

Stade Chaban-Delmas
Attendance: 31,229
Referee: Cedric Marchat

2 March 2014
18:30

Brive	31 – 6	Grenoble
	Stats

Stade Amédée-Domenech
Attendance: 10,125
Referee: Pascal Gaüzère

28 February 2014
20:45

Montpellier	19 – 10	Stade Français
	Stats

Stade Yves-du-Manoir
Attendance: 12,693
Referee: Romain Poite

1 March 2014
18:30

Racing Métro	25 – 15	Castres Olympique
	Stats

Stade Olympique Yves-du-Manoir
Attendance: 8,386
Referee: Jérôme Garcès

1 March 2014
18:30

Toulon	64 – 10	Oyonnax
	Stats

Stade Mayol
Attendance: 13,911
Referee: Alexandre Ruiz

1 March 2014
20:35

Toulouse	37 – 9	Perpignan
	Stats

Stade Ernest-Wallon
Attendance: 17,568
Referee: Salem Attalah

=== Round 17 rescheduled match ===
14 March 2014
20:45

Biarritz Olympique	22 – 24	Oyonnax
	Stats

Parc des Sports Aguiléra
Attendance: 8,236
Referee: Sebastien Cloute

- This match – originally scheduled to be played on 25 January 2014 – was postponed due to heavy rain.

=== Round 22 ===
22 March 2014
18:30

Bayonne	22 – 23	Bordeaux Bègles
	Stats

Stade Jean Dauger
Attendance: 12,602
Referee: Romain Poite

22 March 2014
18:30

Castres Olympique	38 – 6	Brive
	Stats

Stade Pierre-Antoine
Attendance: 8,314
Referee: Laurent Cardona

21 March 2014
20:45

Clermont	22 – 16	Toulon
	Stats

Stade Marcel-Michelin
Attendance: 17,792
Referee: Pascal Gaüzère

22 March 2014
20:35

Grenoble	13 – 26	Racing Métro
	Stats

Stade des Alpes
Attendance: 15,452
Referee: Christophe Berdos

22 March 2014
18:30

Oyonnax	8 – 22	Montpellier
	Stats

Stade Charles-Mathon
Attendance: 8,587
Referee: Jérôme Garcès

22 March 2014
18:30

Perpignan	16 – 10	Biarritz Olympique
	Stats

Stade Aimé Giral
Attendance: 9,908
Referee: Cyril Lafon

22 March 2014
15:00

Stade Français	27 – 27	Toulouse
	Stats

Stade de France
Attendance: 63,075
Referee: Patrick Pechambert

=== Round 23 ===
29 March 2014
18:30

Biarritz Olympique	34 – 34	Castres Olympique
	Stats

Parc des Sports Aguiléra
Attendance: 8,356
Referee: Salem Attalah

- This result means that Biarritz Olympique will finish the season at the bottom of the table.

29 March 2014
18:30

Bordeaux Bègles	23 – 5	Perpignan
	Stats

Stade Chaban-Delmas
Attendance: 26,649
Referee: Sebastien Cloute

28 March 2014
20:45

Brive	26 – 24	Clermont
	Stats

Stade Amédée-Domenech
Attendance: 13,979
Referee: Mathieu Raynal

29 March 2014
18:30

Montpellier	43 – 27	Bayonne
	Stats

Stade Yves-du-Manoir
Attendance: 12,127
Referee: Christophe Berdos

29 March 2014
18:30

Oyonnax	40 – 13	Grenoble
	Stats

Stade Charles-Mathon
Attendance: 8,656
Referee: Sebastien Minery

29 March 2014
14:55

Stade Français	22 – 32	Racing Métro
	Stats

Stade Jean-Bouin
Attendance: 18,551
Referee: Jérôme Garcès

29 March 2014
20:45

Toulon	32 – 28	Toulouse
	Stats

Stade Vélodrome
Attendance: 38,800
Referee: Romain Poite

=== Round 19 rescheduled match ===
5 April 2014
20:35

Oyonnax	26 – 12	Bordeaux Bègles
	Stats

Stade Charles-Mathon
Attendance: 8,801
Referee: Alexandre Ruiz

- This match – originally scheduled to be played on 15 February 2014 – was postponed due to a waterlogged pitch.

=== Round 24 ===
12 April 2014
18:30

Bayonne	24 – 19	Stade Français
	Stats

Estadio Anoeta
Attendance: 22,138
Referee: Alexandre Ruiz

12 April 2014
15:00

Bordeaux Bègles	20 – 22	Toulon
	Stats

Stade Chaban-Delmas
Attendance: 33,043
Referee: Mathieu Raynal

11 April 2014
20:45

Clermont	23 – 11	Castres Olympique
	Stats

Stade Marcel-Michelin
Attendance: 17,746
Referee: Jérôme Garcès

12 April 2014
18:30

Grenoble	30 – 36	Montpellier
	Stats

Stade des Alpes
Attendance: 18,220
Referee: Pascal Gaüzère

12 April 2014
18:30

Perpignan	22 – 12	Oyonnax
	Stats

Stade Aimé Giral
Attendance: 12,751
Referee: Cedric Marchat

12 April 2014
18:30

Racing Métro	37 – 7	Biarritz Olympique
	Stats

Stade Olympique Yves-du-Manoir
Attendance: 9,898
Referee: Laurent Cardona

12 April 2014
20:35

Toulouse	16 – 9	Brive
	Stats

Stade Ernest-Wallon
Attendance: 18,823
Referee: Salem Attalah

=== Round 25 ===
19 April 2014
18:30

Biarritz Olympique	19 – 13	Brive
	Stats

Parc des Sports Aguiléra
Attendance: 8,456
Referee: Cedric Marchat

18 April 2014
20:45

Castres Olympique	22 – 15	Montpellier
	Stats

Stade Pierre-Antoine
Attendance: 9,887
Referee: Mathieu Raynal

19 April 2014
18:30

Grenoble	21 – 21	Bayonne
	Stats

Stade Lesdiguières
Attendance: 10,390
Referee: Cyril Lafon

19 April 2014
14:55

Oyonnax	19 – 19	Toulouse
	Stats

Stade Charles-Mathon
Attendance: 11,303
Referee: Sebastien Cloute

19 April 2014
17:00

Perpignan	31 – 46	Toulon
	Stats

Montjuic, Barcelona
Attendance: 17,491
Referee: Christophe Berdos

19 April 2014
18:30

Racing Métro	22 – 6	Clermont
	Stats

Stade de la Beaujoire, Nantes
Attendance: 9,083
Referee: Romain Poite

19 April 2014
20:35

Stade Français	37 – 23	Bordeaux Bègles
	Stats

Stade Jean-Bouin
Attendance: 10,036
Referee: Pascal Gaüzère

=== Round 26 ===
3 May 2014
14:45

Bayonne	23 – 13	Castres Olympique
	Stats

Stade Jean Dauger
Attendance: 16,933
Referee: Jérôme Garcès

3 May 2014
14:45

Bordeaux Bègles	54 – 20	Biarritz Olympique
	Stats

Stade Chaban-Delmas
Attendance: 32,978
Referee: Patrick Pechambert

3 May 2014
14:45

Brive	19 – 17	Oyonnax
	Stats

Stade Amédée-Domenech
Attendance: 12,780
Referee: Sebastien Minery

3 May 2014
14:45

Clermont	25 – 22	Perpignan
	Stats

Stade Marcel-Michelin
Attendance: 17,751
Referee: Cyril Lafon

3 May 2014
14:45

Montpellier	44 – 10	Racing Métro
	Stats

Stade Yves-du-Manoir
Attendance: 14,719
Referee: Pascal Gaüzère

3 May 2014
14:45

Toulon	17 – 15	Stade Français
	Stats

Allianz Riviera, Nice
Attendance: 27,373
Referee: Sebastien Cloute

3 May 2014
14:45

Toulouse	38 – 8	Grenoble
	Stats

Stade Ernest-Wallon
Attendance: 18,532
Referee: Christophe Berdos

== Playoffs ==
Quarterfinals
4	Toulouse	16
5	Racing Métro	21
3	Clermont	16
6	Castres Olympique	22

Semifinals
1	Toulon	16
5	Racing Métro	6
2	Montpellier	19
6	Castres Olympique	22

Final
1	Toulon	18
6	Castres Olympique	10

All times are in Central European Summer Time (UTC+2).

=== Quarter-finals ===
9 May 2014
20:45

Toulouse	16 – 21	Racing Métro
Try: Gear 43' c Con: Doussain (1/1) 44'; Pen: Doussain (3/5) 4', 50', 58'	Stats	Pen: Sexton (7/7) 11', 16', 26', 31', 54', 62', 78'

Stade Ernest-Wallon
Attendance: 18,500
Referee: Jérôme Garcès

10 May 2014
16:30

Clermont	16 – 22	Castres Olympique
Try: Chouly 77' c Con: James (1/1) 77'; Pen: James (3/3) 4', 25', 32'	Stats	Try: Lamerat 62' c Con: Kockott (1/1) 62'; Pen: Kockott (5/6) 6', 9', 47', 50', 67'

Stade Marcel-Michelin
Attendance: 18,000
Referee: Romain Poite

=== Semi-finals ===
16 May 2014
20:45

Toulon	16 – 6	Racing Métro
Try: Giteau 12' c Con: Wilkinson (1/1); Pen: Wilkinson (2/5) 45', 57'; Drop: Wilkinson (1/1) 71'	Stats	Pen: Sexton (2/3) 16', 32'

Stade Pierre-Mauroy, Villeneuve-d'Ascq
Attendance: 48,982
Referee: Mathieu Raynal

17 May 2014
16:30

Montpellier	19 – 22	Castres Olympique
Try: Ranger 33' c Con: Trinh-Duc (1/1) 34'; Pen: Trinh-Duc (3/4) 54', 57', 64'; Drop: Trinh-Duc (1/1) 15'	Stats	Try: Claassen 30' m Con: Kockott (1/1) 31'; Pen: Kockott (4/8) 4', 22', 44', 66'; Drop: Bai (1/1) 90'

Stade Pierre-Mauroy, Villeneuve-d'Ascq
Attendance: 49,257
Referee: Pascal Gaüzère

=== Final ===
31 May 2014
21:00

Toulon	18 – 10	Castres Olympique
Pen: Wilkinson (4/4) 8', 23', 32', 54'; D. Armitage (1/1) 74'; Drop: Wilkinson (1/1) 36'	Stats	Try: Evans 12' c Con: Kockott (1/1); Pen: Kockott (1/4) 29'

Stade de France, St-Denis
Attendance: 80,174
Referee: Christophe Berdos

FB	15	(England) Delon Armitage
RW	14	(Australia) Drew Mitchell
OC	13	(France) Mathieu Bastareaud
IC	12	(Australia) Matt Giteau
LW	11	(South Africa) Bryan Habana
FH	10	(England) Jonny Wilkinson (c)
SH	9	(France) Sebastien Tillous-Borde
N8	8	(England) Steffon Armitage
OF	7	(Argentina) Juan Martín Fernández Lobbe
BF	6	(South Africa) Juan Smith
RL	5	(New Zealand) Ali Williams
LL	4	(South Africa) Bakkies Botha	(substituted off) 58'
TP	3	(New Zealand) Carl Hayman	(substituted off) 66'
HK	2	(South Africa) Craig Burden	(substituted off) 29'
LP	1	(France) Xavier Chiocci	(substituted off) 51'
Substitutions:
HK	16	(France) Jean-Charles Orioli	(substituted on) 29'
PR	17	(France) Alexandre Menini	(substituted on) 51'
LK	18	(France) Jocelino Suta	(substituted on) 58'
N8	19	(South Africa) Danie Rossouw
FL	20	(France) Virgile Bruni
CE	21	(France) Maxime Mermoz
SH	22	(South Africa) Michael Claassens
PR	23	(Italy) Martin Castrogiovanni	(substituted on) 66'
Coach:
(France) Bernard Laporte

FB	15	(France) Brice Dulin
RW	14	(Scotland) Max Evans
OC	13	(France) Romain Cabannes	(substituted off) 63'
IC	12	(France) Rémi Lamerat
LW	11	(France) Rémy Grosso
FH	10	(France) Rémi Talès (c)	(substituted off) 20'	(substituted on) 25'	(substituted off) 67'
SH	9	(France) Rory Kockott	(substituted off) 77'
N8	8	(France) Antonie Claassen
OF	7	(France) Yannick Caballero	(substituted off) 52'
BF	6	(Samoa) Piula Fa'asalele
RL	5	(Uruguay) Rodrigo Capó Ortega
LL	4	(Scotland) Richie Gray	(substituted off) 52'
TP	3	(Argentina) Ramiro Herrera	(substituted off) 74'
HK	2	(France) Brice Mach	(substituted off) 58'
LP	1	(France) Yannick Forestier	(substituted off) 52'
Substitutions:
HK	16	(France) Mathieu Bonello	(substituted on) 58'
PR	17	(New Zealand) Saimone Taumoepeau	(substituted on) 51'
LK	18	(France) Christophe Samson	(substituted on) 52'
N8	19	(South Africa) Jannie Bornman	(substituted on) 52'
SH	20	(Spain) Cédric Garcia	(substituted on) 77'
CE	21	(Fiji) Seremaia Bai	(substituted on) 63'
FH	22	(New Zealand) Daniel Kirkpatrick	(substituted on) 20'	(substituted off) 25'	(substituted on) 67'
PR	23	(Romania) Mihaita Lazăr	(substituted on) 74'
Coach:
(France) Serge Milhas

Touch judges:
Romain Poite
Sébastien Minery
Television match official:
Laurent Valin

== Top scorers ==
Note: Flags to the left of player names indicate national team as has been defined under IRB eligibility rules, or primary nationality for players who have not yet earned international senior caps. Players may hold one or more non-IRB nationalities.

=== Top points scorers ===
Rank	Player	Team	Points
1	(France) Gaëtan Germain	Brive	299
2	(France) Pierre Bernard	Bordeaux Bègles	294
3	(England) Jonny Wilkinson	Toulon	267
4	(France) Rory Kockott	Castres Olympique	252
5	(Wales) James Hook	Perpignan	248
6	(Argentina) Benjamín Urdapilleta	Oyonnax	239
7	(Australia) Brock James	Clermont	220
7	(Argentina) Martin Bustos Moyano	Bayonne	220
9	(Ireland) Johnny Sexton	Racing Métro	214
10	(France) Benoît Paillaugue	Montpellier	170

=== Top try scorers ===
Rank	Player	Team	Tries
1	(Fiji) Metuisela Talebula	Bordeaux Bègles	15
2	(Australia) Matt Giteau	Toulon	10
2	(Fiji) Timoci Nagusa	Montpellier	10
2	(Ivory Coast) Silvère Tian	Oyonnax	10
5	(New Zealand) Hosea Gear	Toulouse	9
5	(France) Sofiane Guitoune	Perpignan	9
5	(New Zealand) Josevata Rokocoko	Bayonne	9
8	(Fiji) Napolioni Nalaga	Clermont	8
8	(Fiji) Waisea Nayacalevu	Stade Français	8
10	(New Zealand) Alex Tulou	Montpellier	7

== Attendances ==
- Attendances do not include the semi-finals or final as these are at neutral venues.

Club	Home Games	Total	Average	Highest	Lowest	% Capacity
Bayonne	13	181,498	13,961	22,138	10,008	79%
Biarritz	13	130,493	10,038	13,400	8,139	67%
Bordeaux Bègles	13	254,092	19,546	33,043	6,534	77%
Brive	13	145,773	11,213	13,979	9,324	69%
Castres	13	109,797	8,446	9,908	7,404	73%
Clermont (Note: Clermont's attendance figure includes home quarter-final.)	14	239,965	17,140	18,000	15,036	95%
Grenoble	13	169,962	13,074	19,778	7,368	81%
Montpellier	13	163,743	12,596	15,268	9,896	85%
Oyonnax	13	113,421	8,725	11,303	7,294	77%
Perpignan	13	149,565	11,505	17,491	9,477	72%
Racing Métro	13	147,952	11,381	35,342	6,109	50%
Stade Français	13	221,485	17,037	63,075	7,483	67%
Toulon	13	241,652	18,589	38,800	12,330	89%
Toulouse (Note: Toulouse's attendance figure includes home quarter-final.)	14	231,121	16,509	18,838	13,234	85%

== See also ==
- 2013–14 Rugby Pro D2 season
- List of 2013-2014 Top 14 transfers
