= Éric de Cromières =

French sporting executive (1953–2020)

- Born: 20 November 1953; Algiers, French Algeria
- Died: 23 July 2020 (aged 66)
- Education: HEC Paris
- Occupation: Sports Executive

Éric de Cromières (20 November 1953 – 23 July 2020) was a French sporting executive and manager for Michelin.

== Biography ==
Born in Algiers, de Cromières was the son of French Army Captain Bermondet de Cromières and Eliane de Vigneral. He moved to France at the age of 11. He discovered rugby while living in Dax, and played until the age of 24 for his university's team, HEC Paris. After he graduated, he joined the French Navy as an officer in Toulon.

After his military service, he began his long career working for Michelin, starting as a sales representative in Roanne. He then worked as a sales manager and general manager until he retired from the company on 31 March 2015 after having served on the executive committee since 2005.

In 2006, de Cromières became a member of the board of directors of ASM Clermont Auvergne. In 2012, René Fontès chose him to be his successor as Director of the rugby union club, and de Cromières began his term in 2013. The club became Top 14 champions in 2017.

In 2017, following the conflict between the National Rugby League and the French Rugby Federation, the League appointed de Cromières to the Commission for Reconciliation and Dialogue to help find a way out of the crisis. The five other club presidents that accompanied him on the Commission were Mourad Boudjellal, René Bouscatel, Vincent Merling, Pierre-Yves Revol, and Alain Tingaud. In June 2017, the two groups reached an agreement on player availability for international competition, the main issue between them at the time. De Cromières was part of a committee to help maintain the relations between the two set in place from 2018 to 2023. The committee also included Didier Lacroix, Alain Gaillard, and Emmanuel Eschalier.

Éric de Cromières died of cancer on 23 July 2020 at the age of 66.
