= René Fontès =

French sports executive and politician (1941–2019)

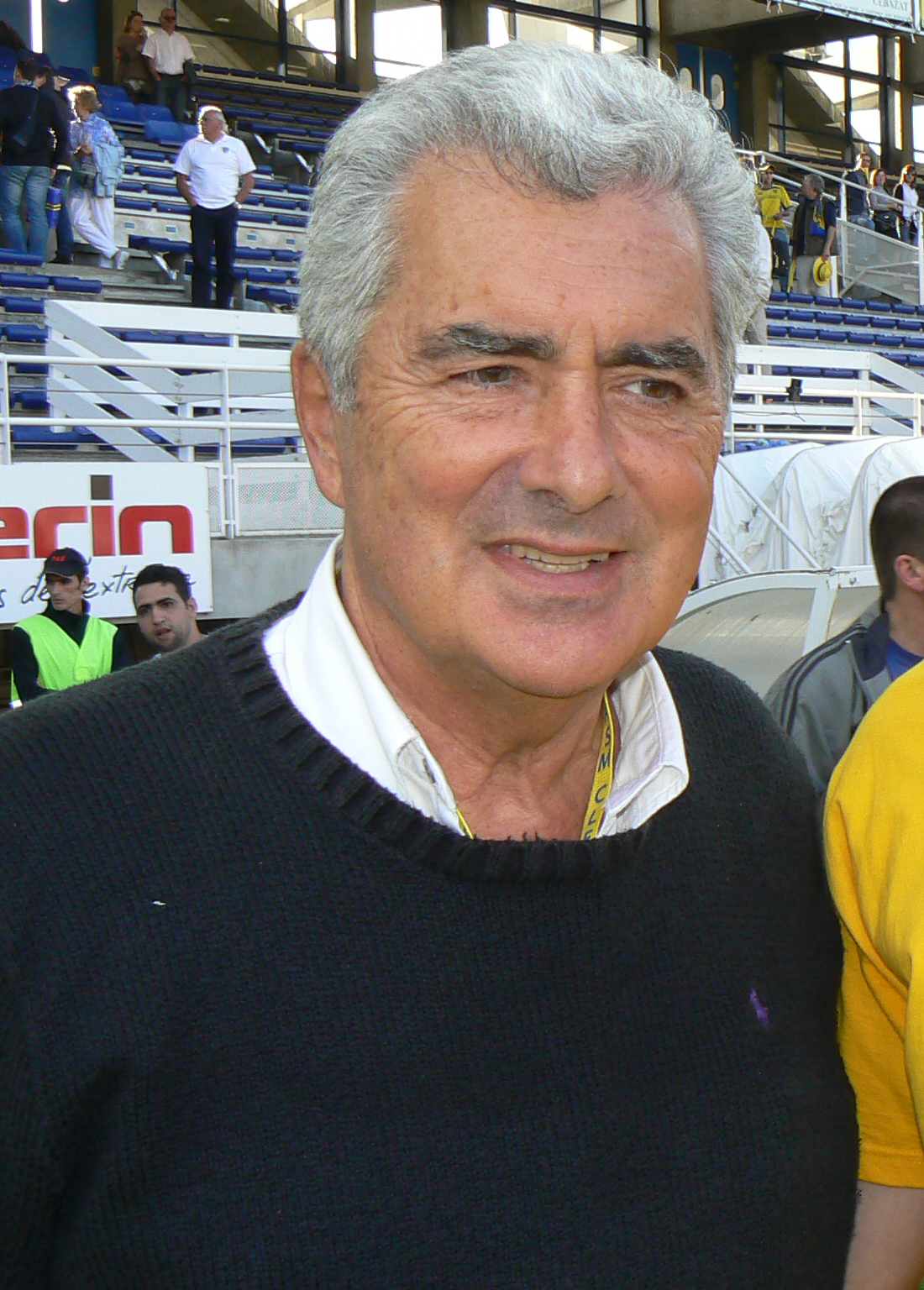
Fontès at Stade Marcel-Michelin, 2010

René Fontès (11 June 1941 – 17 March 2019) was a French rugby union executive and politician. He was the club president of Top 14 side Clermont Auvergne from 2004 to 2013. He was also mayor of the Eygalières commune in Bouches-du-Rhône from 2008 until his death in 2019.

== Biography ==
Born in Saint-Martin-de-Crau, Bouches-du-Rhône, Fontès joined the tyre manufacturer Michelin in 1964 as an electrical engineer. He spent a total of 40 years at Michelin, and, from 1986, was director of the company's European operation before leaving in 2004. He succeeded Jean-Louis Jourdan as club president of rugby union club Clermont Auvergne in July 2004. During his time as president, Clermont were victorious in their 2006–07 European Challenge Cup campaign, and also won their first domestic league title in 2009–10. He also oversaw expansion of the club's stadium, Stade Marcel-Michelin, while serving as president. Fontès left his role at Clermont in June 2013, and was subsequently replaced by Éric de Cromières.

Fontès was elected mayor of the Bouches-du-Rhône commune of Eygalières, in March 2008. He was re-elected in March 2014, and died in office in 2019. From 2011 until his death, Fontès was a board member of the National Rugby League (LNR), and represented the LNR on the committees of European Professional Club Rugby (EPCR) and the French Rugby Federation (FFR).

Fontès was made Chevalier (Knight) of the Légion d'honneur in 2011. On 17 March 2019, he died of a sudden heart attack in Eygalières, at the age of 77.
