= Stade Charles-Mathon =

Sports stadium in Oyonnax, France

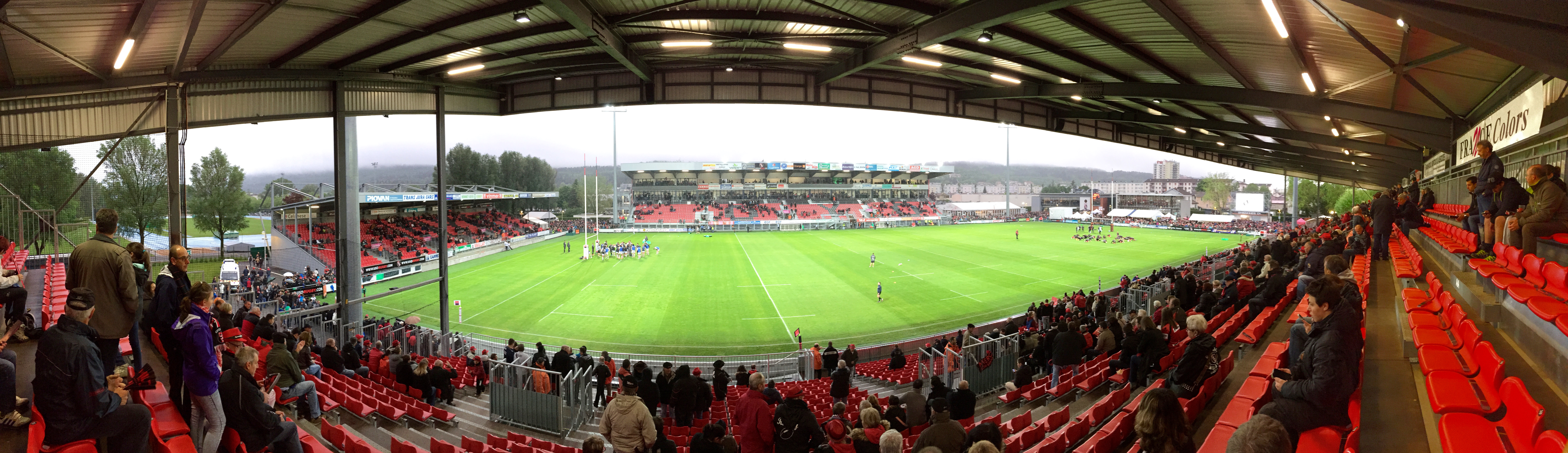
- Interactive map of Stade Charles-Mathon
- Location: Oyonnax, France
- Coordinates: 46°15′13″N 5°38′41″E
- Owner: City of Oyonnax
- Capacity: 11,500
- Surface: synthetic grass

Construction
- Opened: 1939
- Renovated: 1983
- Expanded: 2005

Tenant
- Oyonnax Rugby

Stade Charles-Mathon is a sports stadium located in Oyonnax, France. It is the home of rugby union side Oyonnax Rugby who play in the Top 14.

It was first opened in 1939, and underwent renovations in 1983 and 2005. With the promotion of Oyonnax to the Top14 for season 2013–14, the stadium capacity was expanded from 8,670 to 11,400 places, including 7,500 seats. The capacity went up to 11,500 for the 2018–19 season which was achieved in Oyonnax's Pro D2 semi-final against Bayonne on 18 May 2019.

It takes its name from Charles Mathon, a leading player for the club before the Second World War.
