= Septeo Stadium =

Stadium in Montpellier, France

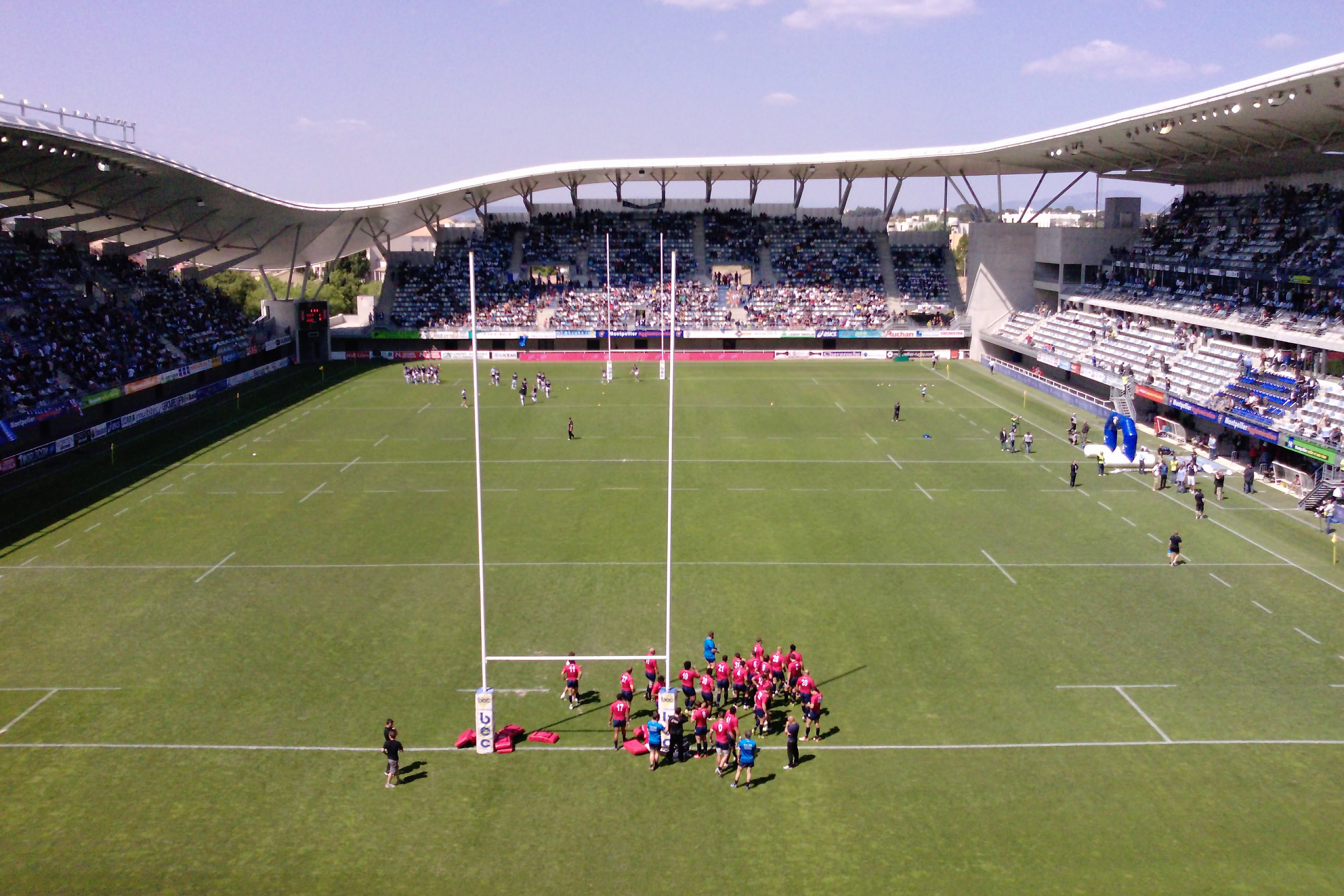
- Interactive map of Septeo Stadium
- Location: Montpellier, France
- Coordinates: 43°35′35″N 3°50′59″E
- Capacity: 15,697

Construction
- Opened: 1928
- Renovated: 2007

Tenants
- Montpellier Hérault RC; 1993 Mediterranean Games opening and closing ceremonies Montpellier HSC (2014–15)

Septeo Stadium (or previously known as Altrad Stadium, Stade Yves-du-Manoir and GGL Stadium) is a multi-use stadium in Montpellier, France. It is currently used mostly for rugby union matches and is the home stadium of Montpellier Hérault RC. The stadium is able to hold 14,800 spectators (12,667 seated). Rugby league side Catalans Dragons used the venue on 5 June 2011 with their tie against Wigan Warriors.

In 2014, Ligue 1 Association football team Montpellier HSC temporarily used the stadium during their 2014–15 season for home games after October floods in Montpellier. Their stadium Stade de la Mosson faced numerous floods and subsequent damages meant the team were unable to use its facility. Altrad held 5 fixtures during this time, 4 Ligue 1 matches and 1 Coupe de la Ligue game which lasted from 28 October up to their last game on 13 December 2014, before the team returned to their home stadium.

The stadium is named after GGL, a property company based in Montpellier.

== History ==
=== The inauguration ===
The new stadium was officially inaugurated at 11 a.m. on June 23, 2007, in front of an audience of 5,000. Alongside architects Philippe Cervantes, Philippe Bonon and Denis Bedeau, the podium was attended by a host of sports and political personalities:

- The stadium by night
- Unveiling of the giant jersey at the inauguration ceremony
- View from the Murrayfield stand
- The stadium roof is visible from Place du Peyrou, 2.4 kilometers away.
- Georges Frêche, President of the Languedoc-Roussillon region and the Montpellier urban community;
- Hélène Mandroux, Mayor of Montpellier;
- Robert Lecou, Member of Parliament for the constituency;
- Professor Henri Pujol, President of the Ligue Nationale contre le Cancer;
- Bernard Lapasset, President of the FFR;
- Thierry Pérez, president of Montpellier Hérault rugby;
- Phil Thomson, manager of the Australian rugby team;
- Daniel Herbert, 1999 World Champion;
- players from the Languedoc-Roussillon amateur rugby team;
- André Quilis, former Montpellier coach;
- Raymond Rebujent, vice-president of USAP;
- Gilles Bourguignon, vice-president of the Racing Club de Narbonne Méditerranée.
