= Stade Marcel-Michelin =

Stadium in Clermont-Ferrand, France

Coordinates: 45°47′22″N 3°6′22″E

- Le Michelin
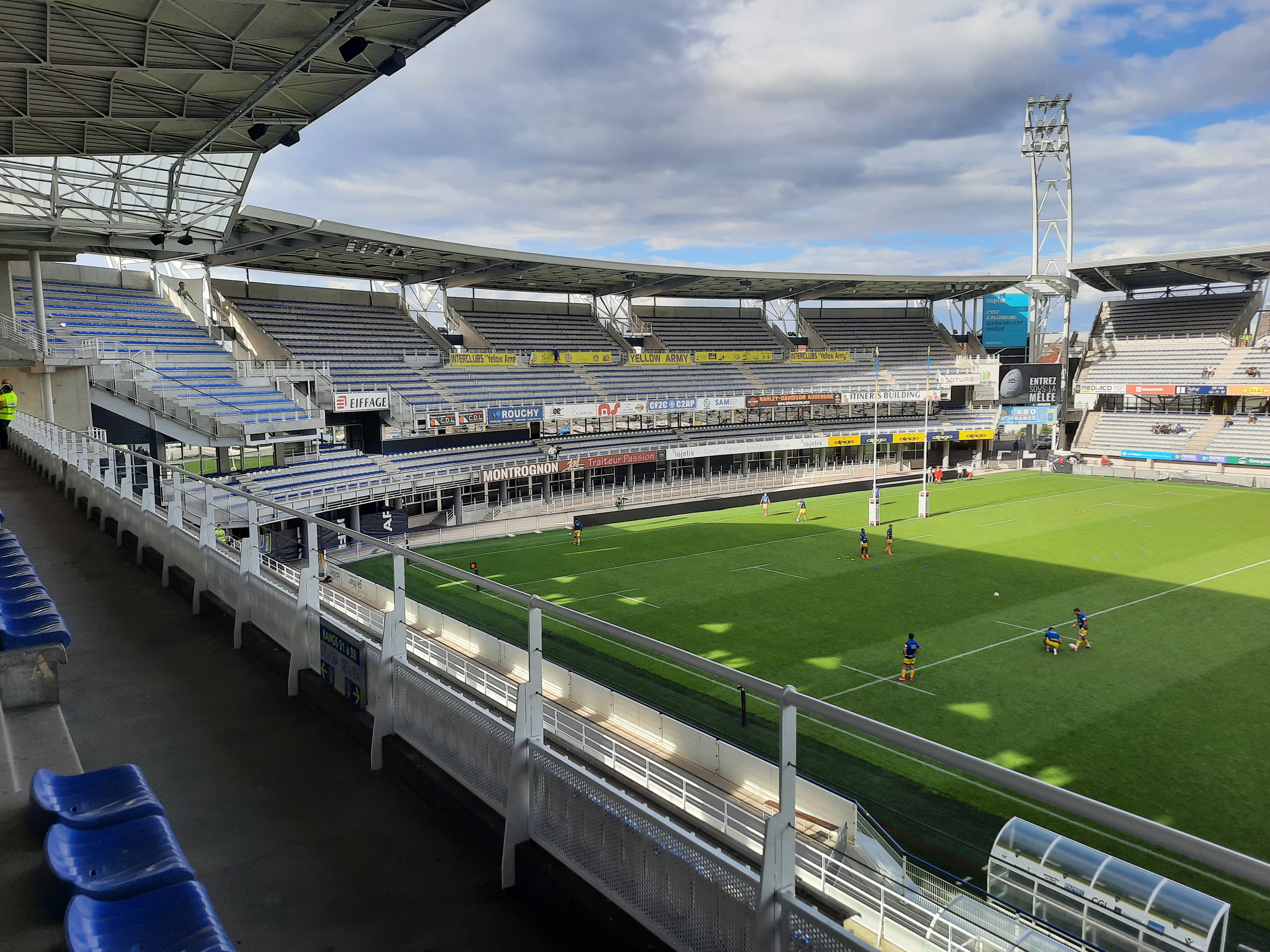
- Interactive map of Stade Marcel-Michelin
- Full name: Stade Marcel-Michelin
- Location: Clermont-Ferrand, France
- Capacity: 19,357
- Surface: grass

Construction
- Opened: 1911
- Renovated: 2006-2008, 2010-2011
- Cost: €12 million (2006-2008 renovation)

Tenant
- ASM Clermont Auvergne

The Stade Marcel-Michelin is a sports ground in Clermont-Ferrand, France. It has been the home of the French rugby union club ASM Clermont-Auvergne since its opening in 1911. The stadium takes its name from the founder of the Association Sportive Michelin (ASM), Marcel Michelin, who was the son of the founder of the Michelin tire company. The Association Sportive Michelin was later renamed the Association Sportive Montferrand (ASM), and the rugby club became known as ASM Clermont-Auvergne. Although the stadium itself belongs to the rugby club, it is built on ground leased from the Michelin tire company.

== History ==
In 1911, on the initiative of Marcel Michelin, the tire company Michelin financed the construction of a rugby ground in the city centre of Clermont-Ferrand, on the Avenue de la République. This became known as the Marcel Michelin stadium and it hosted matches played by what was then the AS Michelin rugby club. It remains the property of the club, now called ASM Clermont-Ferrand, which hosts all its Top 14 home games at the stadium, as well as some international matches, including France-Romania in 1977, France-Australia in 1983, the 2006 Under 21 Rugby World Cup (in which France beat South Africa for the championship), and the 2013 match between the French Barbarians and Samoa.

The stadium was also used by the Clermont Football Club between 1984 and 1988.

At the exit from the dressing rooms, the club's players can see a plaque that displays the number of victories their team has had on the ground. The 1000th match won in elite competition (after 1925) came in December 2006 against Arix Viadana during the European Challenge Cup. A new plaque with the words "Ici … 100 ans d’histoire" ("Here… 100 years of legend") was installed in 2011 for the centenary of the club.

The stadium has undergone many changes since its construction in 1911.

In 1968, the VIP stand was built. This has been known variously as the "Great Stand" (Grande Tribune), the Volvic stand (after 2007), and the Limagrain stand (from 2016). It has seating for 5,600 spectators.

In 1999, a second stand was built to replace the original one for the general public. It was known as the Auvergne stand, then as the Auvergne-Rhône-Alpes stand after a reorganisation of the French regions. It has 7,560 seats.

In 2001, a new training ground for the professional team was built behind the eastern Auvergne stand. Up-and-coming players of the club continue to train at the formation centre in the Gauthière quarter of the city.

Development of the Marcel Michelin stadium continued in 2006 when club president René Fontès suggested a new stand be built to join the two existing stands. The new stand was named the Phliponeau stand in honour of Jean-François Phliponeau, a player killed by lightning during a match at the ground on 8 May 1976. The Phliponeau stand seats 3,000 spectators and includes sports and medical facilities, offices for sporting staff, and caretaker accommodation.

In 2007, the southern stand was built and named Edward's Place (Espace d'Édouard) in honour of the recent CEO of the Michelin tire company, Édouard Michelin, who died while fishing out at sea.

In 2008, the shopping plaza with a bank, optometrist, and restaurants, etc was built, along with an underground carpark for 120 vehicles.

In 2009, the stadium acquired two new entrances, on the north and the south, with ticket vending facilities.

The last stage of development of the present design was joining up the corners of the four stands in 2011. In the angles between stands there are now foyers, sitting areas, and giant screens. During the 2011 works, the club improved the television platforms, created four new boxes in the Volvic stand, and extended the ASM shop. The south-west corner took the name of a sponsor, Crédit Agricole Centre France.

During the summer of 2013, the club laid kilometres of electric heating cables 25 cm under their playing field, making ASM Clermont-Ferrand the first of France's Top 14 clubs to have a heated turf.

== The stands ==
The stadium consists of four stands joined at the corners to form a rectangle. The two long stands are on the east and the west (Limagrain, the oldest, formerly known as the Volvic, and the Auvergne-Rhône-Alpes). The two others are the Phliponeau on the north (named for the Montferrand player Jean-François Phliponeau) and the Espace Édouard on the south. The oldest of the existing stands is the Limagrain, while the stand with the largest capacity is the Auvergne-Rhône-Alpes. The Phliponeau stand is home to supporters' groups like the Ultras Vulcans, the Vignerons, the XV au Charbon, the XV Montferrandais, and the XV de Limagne.

== See also ==
- ASM Clermont-Auvergne
- Top 14
- Rugby Union
