= Stade des Alpes =

Rugby and football stadium in Grenoble, France

Coordinates: 45°11′15″N 5°44′24″E

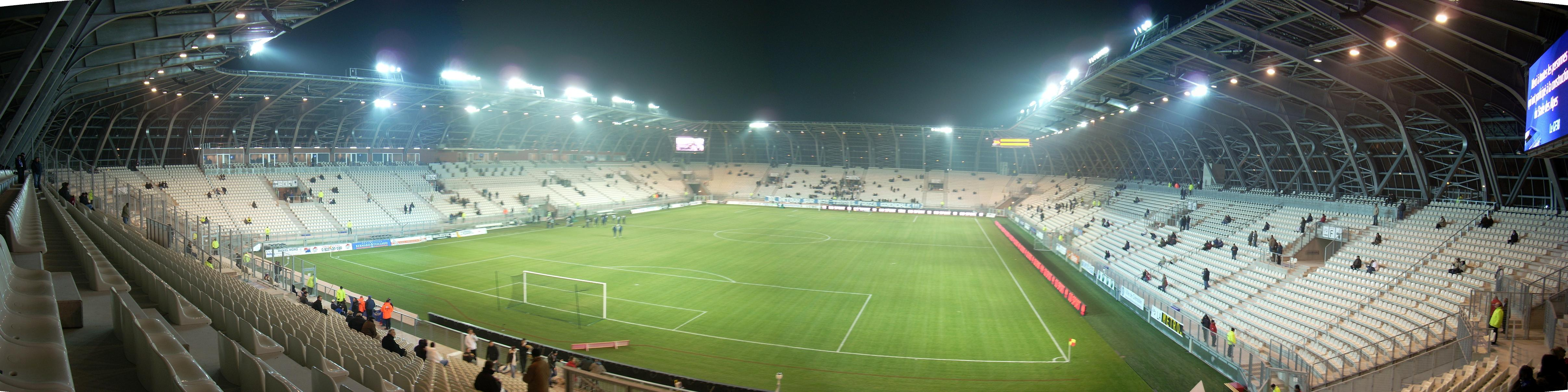
- Interactive map of Stade des Alpes
- Full name: Stade des Alpes
- Location: Grenoble, France
- Owner: Grenoble Alpes Metropole
- Capacity: 20,068
- Surface: Grass
- Field size: 10,000 m2

Construction
- Opened: 15 February 2008
- Cost: €88 million

Tenant
- Grenoble Foot 38 (2008–present) FC Grenoble (2008–present)

The Stade des Alpes (Alpine Stadium) is a rugby and football stadium in Grenoble, France. The stadium seats 20,068 and hosts the home games of Grenoble Foot 38 and the FC Grenoble rugby club. Situated in Paul Mistral Park, it replaced their stadium Stade Lesdiguières.

The venue was built while GF38 played in the top divisions of French football, and had become somewhat of a white elephant when the club fell to the 4th division and attracted few fans. However, the stadium gained greater viability once FC Grenoble earned their most recent promotion to the Top 14 in 2012. Since 2014–15, with FC Grenoble now consolidated in Top 14, the club have changed their primary home from their traditional ground, Stade Lesdiguières, to Stade des Alpes. With GF38 returning to the second tier of French football in 2017, the side began to attract more fans again.

The first goal scored there was by Ivorian striker Franck Dja Djedje, then playing for GF38 on loan from Paris Saint-Germain F.C.

On February 10, 2017, it hosted a Six Nations Under 20s Championship match between France and Scotland with France winning 36 - 8.

This stadium uses solar panels and produces more than 70 MWh per year.

== 2019 FIFA Women's World Cup ==
The stadium was one of the venues for the 2019 FIFA Women's World Cup.

Date	Time (CEST)	Team #1	Res.	Team #2	Round	Attendance
9 June 2019	15:30	Brazil	3–0	Jamaica	Group C	17,668
12 June 2019	15:00	Nigeria	2–0	South Korea	Group A	11,252
15 June 2019	21:00	Canada	2–0	New Zealand	Group E	14,856
18 June 2019	21:00	Jamaica	1–4	Australia	Group C	17,402
22 June 2019	17:30	Germany	3–0	Nigeria	Round of 16	17,988

== See also ==
- List of football stadiums in France
- Lists of stadiums
