= Stade Amédée-Domenech =

Football stadium in France

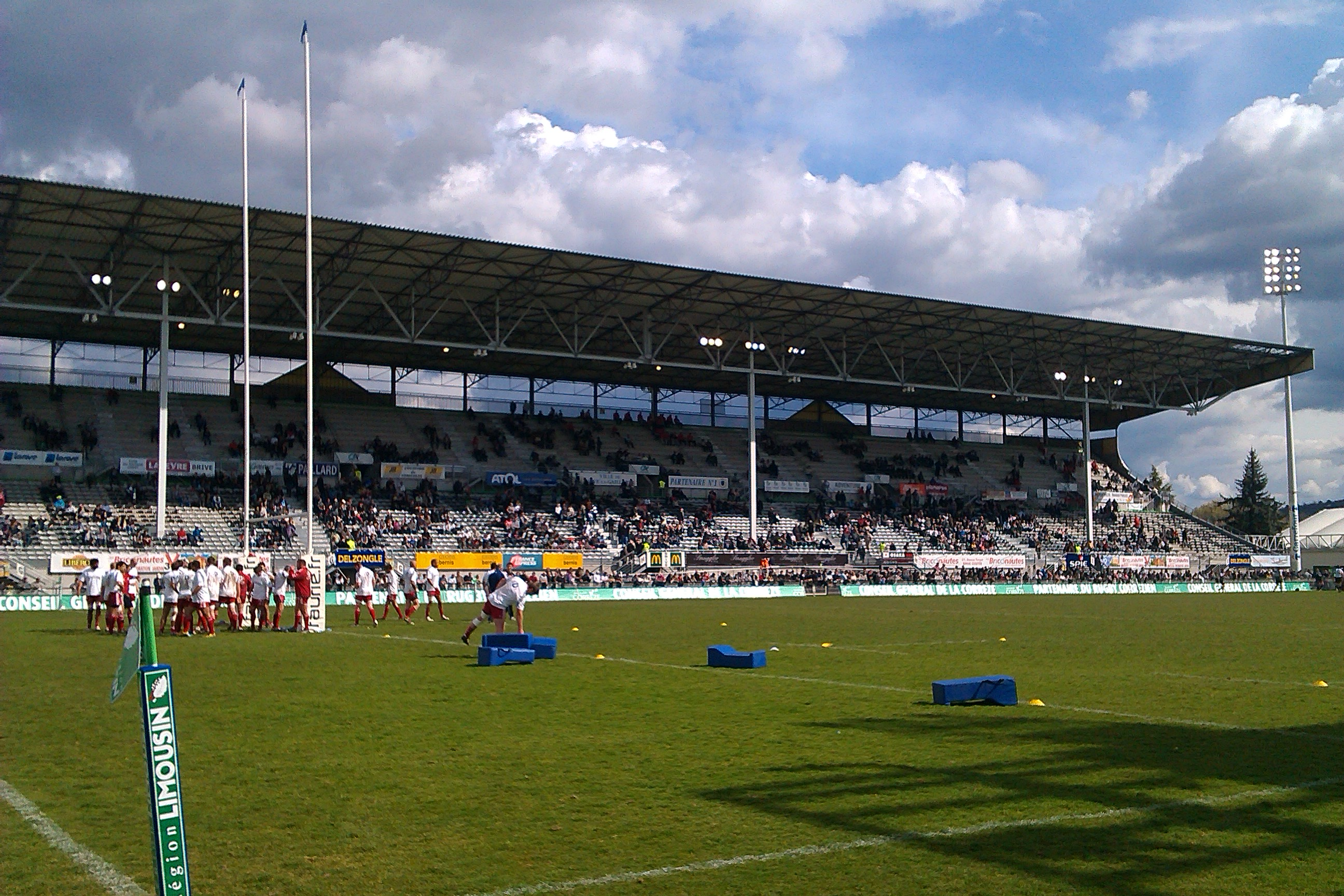
- Interior of the Stade Amédée-Domenech
- Interactive map of Stade Amédée-Domenech
- Former names: Stadium Parc Municipal Des Sports
- Coordinates: 45°9′42″N 1°32′55″E
- Owner: City of Brive
- Capacity: 13,979
- Surface: hybrid grass

Construction
- Opened: September 25, 1921
- Renovated: 1971, 1989
- Expanded: 2011

Tenant
- CA Brive

The Stade Amédée-Domenech is a multi-purpose stadium in Brive-la-Gaillarde, France. It is currently used mostly for rugby union matches and is the home stadium of CA Brive. The stadium is able to hold 16,000. Its official name was the Stadium until 2004, but it was called Stade Amedee-Domenech after the French international rugby player Amédée Domenech died in 2003.

The Stade Amédée-Domenech is the theatre of the matches of the Brive rugby team since 1921. There were some interruptions. From 1938 to 1941, the Brive rugby XIII team has played to the Stadium, and at the beginning of the Second World War, the field was invaded by army's machines. And from 1957 to 1960, there were refection works in the Stadium, which was damaged. In October 1991, a Rugby World Cup match between Romania and Fiji was held there, and two years later the France national team played there against Romania.

There were also football matches in the Stade Amedee-Domenech. The local football team, ESA Brive, has played important matches of the French Cup, especially in 2004, against the AJ Auxerre and Paris Saint-Germain.

It is the most important stadium of the Limousin.
