= Stade André Moga =

Sports stadium in Bègles, France

Coordinates: 44°48′19.02″N 0°33′8.98″W

- Interactive map of Stade André Moga
- Location: 25 rue Delphin Loche, 33130 Bègles, France
- Capacity: 10,000
- Surface: Grass

Construction
- Built: 1920

Tenant
- Union Bordeaux Bègles

Stade André Moga is a sports stadium in Bègles, France. It hosts the home matches of Union Bordeaux Bègles, a rugby union team who play in the Top 14 competition. The Stadium is part of the Delphin Loche sporting complex which is composed of two playing fields and a Basque Pelota wall and court.

== History ==
Built in the early 1920s on a field called Musard, the stadium is still unofficially called Musard Stadium. Officially named Andre Moga in honor of a former player and club president, the stadium holds up to 7000 seats but has a full capacity of 10,000 spectators.

== See also ==
- List of rugby league stadiums by capacity
- List of rugby union stadiums by capacity
