= Stade Jean-Dauger =

Multi-purpose stadium in Bayonne, France

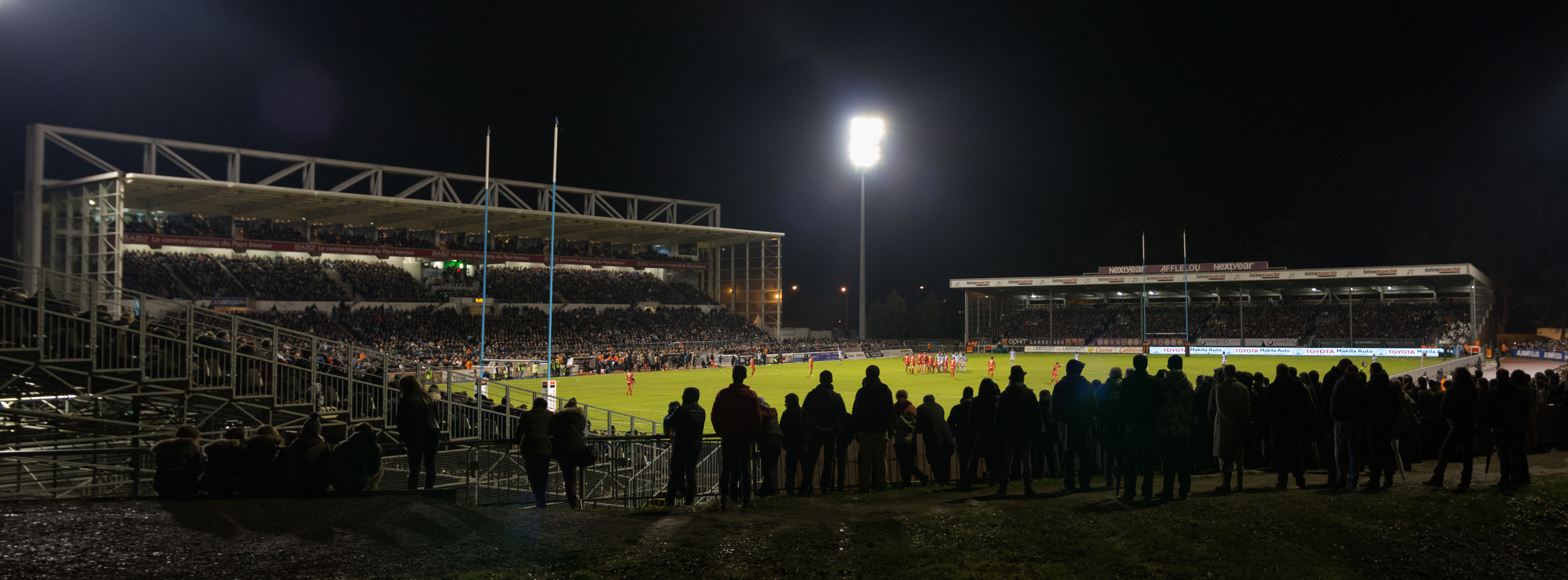
- Interactive map of Stade Jean-Dauger
- Former names: Parc des Sports de Saint Léon
- Location: Bayonne, France
- Coordinates: 43°29′8″N 1°28′45″W
- Owner: City of Bayonne
- Operator: City of Bayonne
- Capacity: 14,370
- Surface: grass

Construction
- Opened: 1937
- Renovated: 2006 to 2009, 2021

Tenant
- Aviron Bayonnais

Stade Jean-Dauger (Basque: Jean Dauger estadioa) is a multi-purpose stadium in Bayonne, France. It is currently used mostly for rugby union matches and is the home stadium of Aviron Bayonnais. After a renovation project completed in 2009, the stadium can hold 14,370 spectators. The stadium is named after the late Jean Dauger, former rugby union and league player who played for Aviron Bayonnais.

It hosted the match between Canada and Fiji during the 1991 Rugby World Cup. Canada won the match 13–3.

In July 2011 the stadium hosted all four matches of the Kopa Baiona. It was a friendly football tournament involving Olympique de Marseille, FC Girondins de Bordeaux, Udinese Calcio and Real Betis. It was won by Udinese Calcio.
