= Stade Lesdiguières =

Sports venue in Grenoble, France

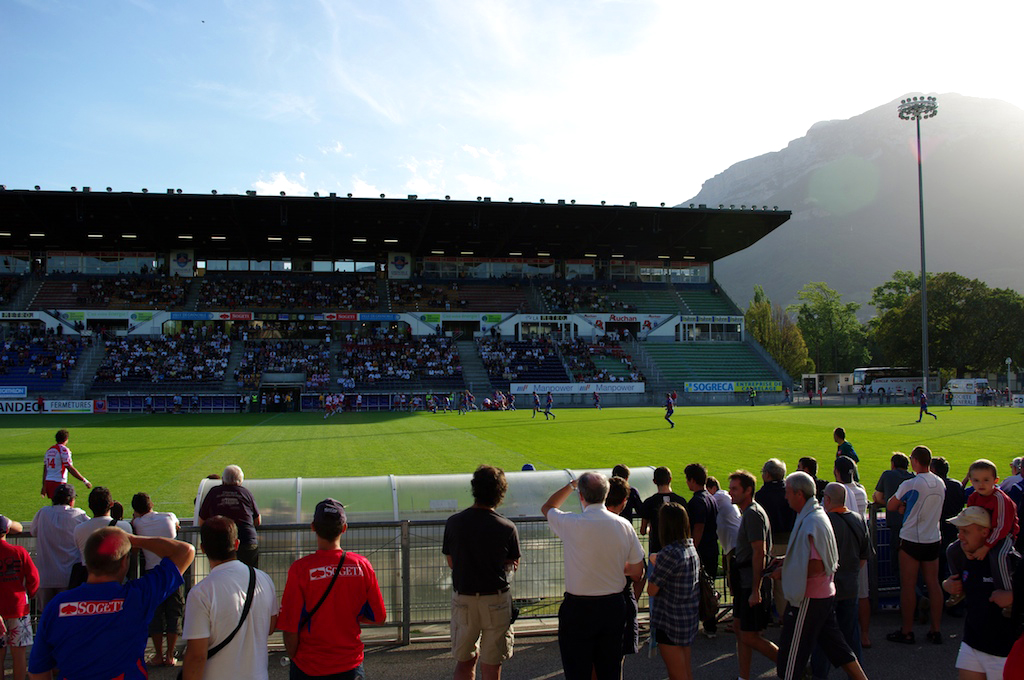
- Interactive map of Stade Lesdiguières
- Location: Grenoble, France
- Coordinates: 45°9′58″N 5°42′34″E
- Capacity: 12,000

Construction
- Opened: 1911
- Renovated: 1991

Tenant
- FC Grenoble Rugby

Stade Lesdiguières (French pronunciation: [stad lediɡjɛʁ]) is a multi-purpose stadium in Grenoble, France. The stadium holds 12,000 spectators (8,500 seated). It is the home of the FC Grenoble rugby union club. The name of the stadium was given in honor of François de Bonne, Duke of Lesdiguières, died in 1626.

The Stadium is made up of 5 stands, the largest of which is the Tribune Présidentielle to the south. The Tribune Tennis is on the east side, so called because it is next to a tennis club, and is the only stand which is uncovered. On the north side there are the Tribune Nord and Tribune Alberto stands, which lie adjacent to each other.

== History ==
France hosted the 1972 Rugby League World Cup and Stade Lesdiguières was the venue for one match between the home team and Great Britain.

When the stadium hosted football venues, from 1998 to 2008, the Tribune Alberto welcomed the away supporters, as well as some home fans and the last stand, the Tribune Finet, was home to the noisiest fans of Grenoble Foot 38.

From 2008, the football venues are hosted by the Stade des Alpes and Lesdiguieres is today only used for Rugby union matches.

It was at this stadium that Italy defeated France by 40–32 to win their first historical triumph in the 1995-1997 FIRA Trophy, which paved the way to their admission to the expanded Six Nations Championship.

It hosted a match between France and Fiji at the 1991 Rugby World Cup.

The New Zealand national rugby union team also played a game on September 4, 1981, against a French Selection, which they lost 16 - 18, their only defeat of that 1981 tour in France.
