= Major sports event hosting in Britain during the 2010s =

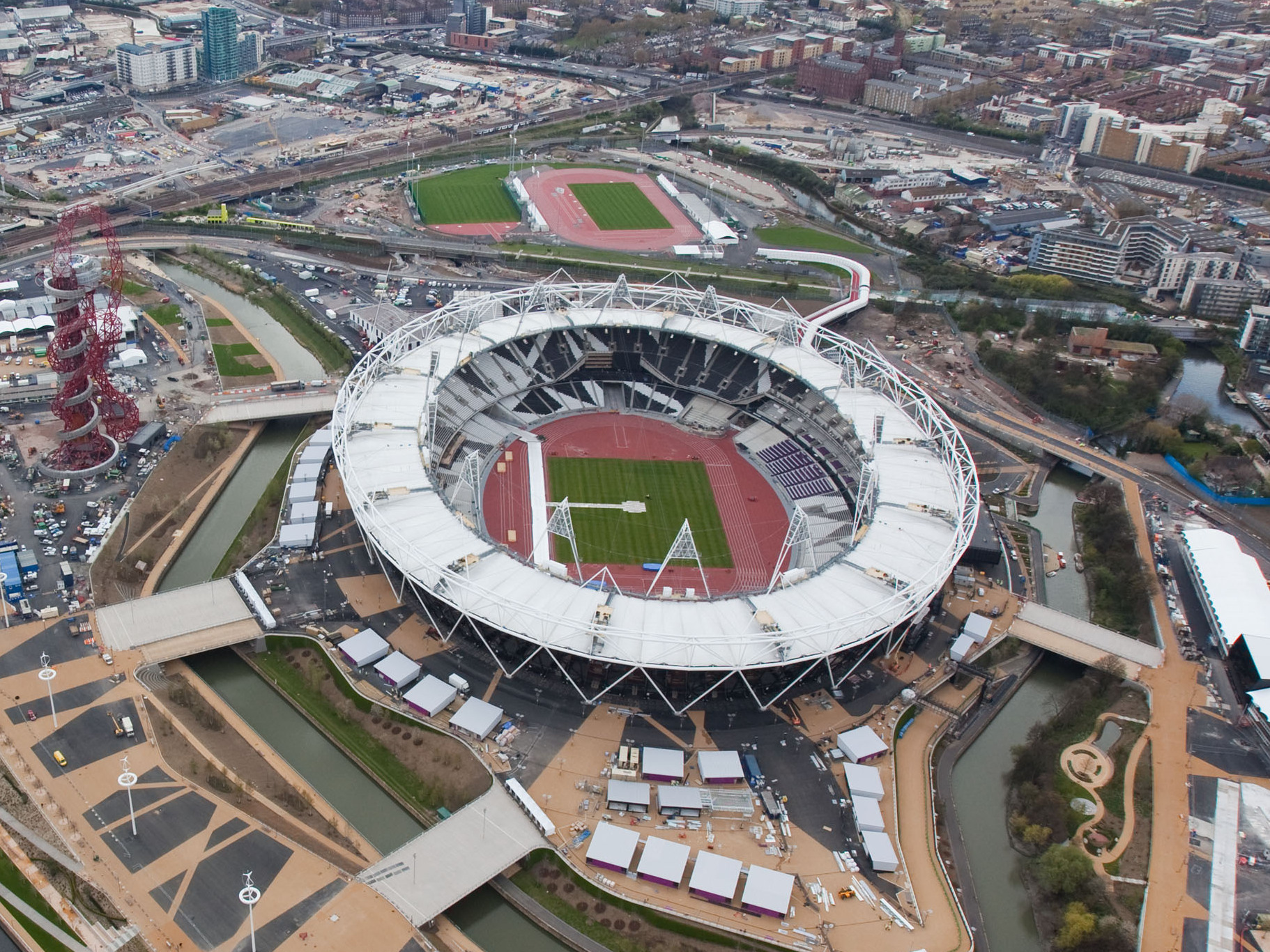
The 2012 Olympic and Paralympic Games were one of several international sporting events held in Britain during the 2010s decade.

The United Kingdom was awarded a number of major international sporting events during the 2010s leading to an idea of a 'Golden Decade' in British sport. The idea of the golden decade has been discussed in many newspapers and has been mentioned by former Prime Minister Gordon Brown and Lord Coe.

== Timeline of events ==
=== 2010 ===
14–18 April – 2010 European Badminton Championships at the Manchester Arena in Manchester

7–17 July – 2010 Wheelchair Basketball World Championship at the National Indoor Arena in Birmingham

15–24 July – 2010 World Lacrosse Championship at the University of Manchester in Manchester

17 July – Completion of the 2009–10 Clipper Round the World Yacht Race in Kingston upon Hull

20 August – 5 September – Women's Rugby World Cup in London

1–4 October – Ryder Cup at Celtic Manor Resort in Newport

21–28 November – ATP World Tour Finals at The O2 Arena in London

=== 2011 ===
20–21 May – Amlin Challenge Cup and Heineken Cup Finals in at the Cardiff City Stadium and Millennium Stadium in Cardiff

26 May – Women's Champions League Final at Craven Cottage in London

28 May – Champions League Final at Wembley Stadium in London

3–7 August – International Children's Games in Lanarkshire

8–14 August – BWF World Championships at Wembley Arena in London

17–20 November – 2011 Trampoline World Championships at the National Indoor Arena in Birmingham

20–27 November – ATP World Tour Finals at The O2 Arena in London

=== 2012 ===
20–26 February – 2012 FINA Diving World Cup at the London Aquatics Centre in London

3–6 May – 2012 European Taekwondo Championships at SportCity in Manchester

18–19 May – Amlin Challenge Cup and Heineken Cup Finals at the Twickenham Stoop and Twickenham Stadium in London

27 July – 12 August – Summer Olympics in London

29 August – 9 September – Summer Paralympics in London

16–18 November – UCI Track Cycling World Cup at the Sir Chris Hoy Velodrome in Glasgow

November – ATP World Tour Finals at The O2 Arena in London

=== 2013 ===
21 April – IPC Athletics Marathon World Cup in London

10–12 May – 2013 EuroLeague Final Four at The O2 Arena in London

23 May – 2013 UEFA Women's Champions League Final at Stamford Bridge in London

25 May – 2013 UEFA Champions League Final at Wembley Stadium in London

6–23 June – 2013 ICC Champions Trophy at The Oval, Edgbaston and Cardiff

21–23 June – 2013 World Rowing Cup at Eton Dorney in Windsor

1–10 August – 2013 World Police and Fire Games in Belfast

3–4 August – Prudential Ride London, Grand Prix, London-Surrey 100 & London-Surrey Classic

7–11 August – UCI Juniors Track World Championships at the Sir Chris Hoy Velodrome in Glasgow

1 September – Beginning of the Clipper Round the World Yacht Race at St Katharine Docks in London

11–15 September – ITU World Triathlon Series Final at Hyde Park in London

26 October – 30 November – Rugby League World Cup in England and Wales

1–3 November – UCI Track Cycling World Cup at the Manchester Velodrome in Manchester

4–11 November – ATP World Tour Finals at The O2 Arena in London

=== 2014 ===
13 April – IPC Athletics Marathon World Cup in London

23–24 May – Amlin Challenge Cup and Heineken Cup Finals at Cardiff Arms Park and the Millennium Stadium in Cardiff

26–29 June World Corporate Games Liverpool presented by the International festival of Business. Delivered at multiple sporting venues across the Liverpool and City region and St George's Hall

5–7 July – Le Grand Depart, 2014 Tour de France in Yorkshire, Cambridge and London

24 July – 3 August – Commonwealth Games in Glasgow

18–23 August – IPC Athletics European Championships at Swansea University

10–14 September – Invictus Games London 2014 at Queen Elizabeth Olympic Park

26–28 September – Ryder Cup at Gleneagles

9–16 November – ATP World Tour Finals at The O2 Arena in London

26–30 November – NEC Wheelchair Tennis Masters at Lee Valley Hockey and Tennis Centre in London

=== 2015 ===
26 April – IPC Athletics Marathon World Cup in London

16–19 April – European Judo Championships in Glasgow

1–2 May – European Rugby Challenge Cup and European Rugby Champions Cup Finals at the Twickenham Stoop and Twickenham Stadium in London

19–25 July – 2015 IPC Swimming World Championships at Tollcross International Swimming Centre in Glasgow

31 July – 8 August – World Orienteering Championships in Inverness

1 – 30 August 2015 – EuroHockey Nations Championship at Lee Valley Hockey and Tennis Centre in London

28 August – 6 September – European Wheelchair Basketball Championship 2015

18 September – 31 October – Rugby World Cup in England

15–20 September – ICF Canoe Slalom World Championships at Lee Valley White Water Centre in London

23 October – 1 November – World Artistic Gymnastics Championships in Glasgow

26–30 November – Wheelchair Tennis Masters at Lee Valley Hockey and Tennis Centre in London

2–6 December – ATP World Tour Finals at The O_{2} Arena in London

=== 2016 ===
2–6 March – 2016 UCI Track Cycling World Championships at the London Velodrome in London

24 April – IPC Athletics Marathon World Cup in London

9–22 May – 2016 LEN European Aquatics Championships at the London Aquatics Centre in London

18–26 June – Women's Hockey Champions Trophy at Lee Valley Hockey and Tennis Centre in London –

7–25 June – 2016 World Rugby Under 20 Championship in Greater Manchester

13–20 November – ATP World Tour Finals at The O_{2} Arena in London

Dates to be confirmed – Wheelchair Tennis Masters at Lee Valley Hockey and Tennis Centre in London

=== 2017 ===
April (dates to be confirmed) – IPC Athletics Marathon World Cup in London

12 and 13 May – 2017 European Rugby Challenge Cup Final and 2017 European Rugby Champions Cup Final at Murrayfield in Edinburgh

1–18 June – 2017 ICC Champions Trophy in England and Wales

3 June - 2017 UEFA Champions League final at Millennium Stadium in Cardiff

13–22 July – 2017 Women's Lacrosse World Cup at the Surrey Sports Park in Guildford

14–23 July – 2017 World Para Athletics Championships at the Olympic Stadium in London

July (dates to be confirmed) – Men's Hockey World League Semi-Final 2 at Lee Valley Hockey and Tennis Centre in London

5–13 August – 2017 IAAF Athletics World Championships at the Olympic Stadium in London

8–25 August – 2017 Women's Rugby World Cup in Dublin and Belfast – Co-hosted

12–19 November – 2017 ATP Finals at The O_{2} Arena in London

=== 2018 ===
4–20 May – 2018 UEFA European Under-17 Championship

14–15 July – Inaugural Athletics World Cup

7–21 July – Women's Hockey World Cup at Lee Valley Hockey and Tennis Centre in London

11–18 November – 2018 ATP Finals at The O_{2} Arena in London

=== 2019 ===
10 and 11 May – 2019 European Rugby Challenge Cup Final and 2019 European Rugby Champions Cup Final at St James' Park in Newcastle

30 May – 14 July – 2019 ICC Cricket World Cup in England and Wales

12–21 July – 2019 Netball World Cup in Liverpool.

13–15 September – 2019 Solheim Cup at Gleneagles near Auchterarder, Scotland

21–29 September – 2019 UCI Road World Championships in Yorkshire

November (dates TBA) – 2019 ATP Finals at The O_{2} Arena in London

== Events hosted ==
=== 2009–2020 ATP Finals ===
The ATP Finals, which ends the ATP Tour season in men's tennis, has been hosted at The O_{2} Arena in London since 2009. The hosting contract currently runs through the 2020 edition.

=== 2010 World Lacrosse Championships ===
Manchester hosted the world's biggest lacrosse event in July 2010. It was the third edition of the World Lacrosse Championships held in England, with Manchester hosting the 1994 tournament and Stockport hosting in 1978. The event took place at the University of Manchester, on the same campus used for the athletes' village at the 2002 Commonwealth Games.

=== 2010 Women's Rugby World Cup ===
The International Rugby Board, now known as World Rugby, which governs rugby union, announced in September 2008 that the 2010 Women's Rugby World Cup would be held in London. The event was held in late August and early September. All matches took place at the Surrey Sports Park in Guildford, except for the semi-finals, third-place match, and final, which were held at the Twickenham Stoop.

=== 2010 Ryder Cup ===
The 2010 Ryder Cup was held at the Celtic Manor Resort Hotel in Newport, South Wales. Originally scheduled for 1–3 October, it was extended to 4 October due to delays caused by heavy rains.

=== 2011 European Rugby Challenge Cup and European Rugby Champions Cup ===
Millennium Stadium hosted the 2011 Heineken Cup Final on 21 May. This was the fourth time that the Cardiff venue, the home of Welsh rugby union, hosted this event. The day before, the city also hosted the final of the second-tier Amlin Challenge Cup at Cardiff City Stadium.

=== 2011 Women's Champions League and Champions League Finals ===
Wembley Stadium hosted the 2011 UEFA Champions League Final on 28 May. This was the first time the current Wembley had hosted the event; the original Wembley Stadium had hosted the final five times. Including two finals at Hampden Park in Glasgow and one at Old Trafford in Manchester, this was the ninth time that Britain had hosted the European Cup/Champions League final.

As a part of its successful bid, London was also awarded the 2011 UEFA Women's Champions League Final, which was held on 26 May at Craven Cottage. It was the first time Britain had hosted the final of the women's event.

=== 2011 International Children's Games ===
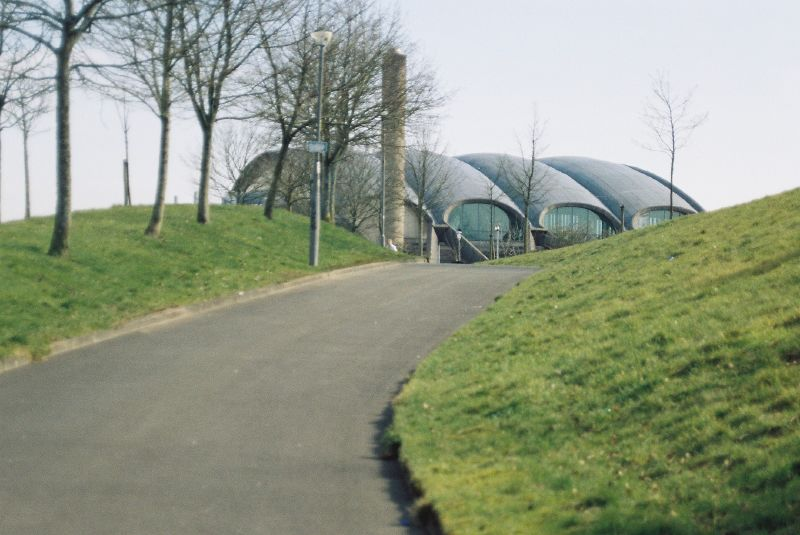
Dollan Baths

The International Children's Games is the world's largest international multi-sport youth event, with nearly 2,000 athletes, coaches and officials from over 70 countries taking part. The event is informally referred to as the 'Mini-Olympics'. Lanarkshire won the unanimous backing of the ICG Committee for hosting rights to the 2011 Games, beating strong competition from Singapore and Daegu. Scotland's First Minister Alex Salmond spoke to the committee in a video message, pointing out that the awarding of the 2011 Games to Lanarkshire would be a major boost to the local area and informing them that the entire nation was supporting the bid. One of the prime venues was Strathclyde Country Park, which is also an official 2014 Commonwealth Games venue. Other venues included the new £29m sports facility at Ravenscraig, the Historic Scotland Category A listed Dollan Baths and the Airdrie Lesiure Centre.

=== 2012 Amlin Challenge Cup and Heineken Cup Finals ===
Twickenham, home to both the England national rugby union team and England's national governing body for the sport, hosted the 2012 Heineken Cup Final on 19 May. As with Millennium Stadium the year before, this was the fourth final for Twickenham. The adjacent Twickenham Stoop hosted the Amlin Challenge Cup final on the day before the Heineken Cup Final; this was the fourth Challenge Cup final at The Stoop.

=== 2012 Summer Olympics ===
After Birmingham and Manchester failed to deliver winning bids for the 1992, 1996 and 2000 Olympic Games, the British Olympic Association (BOA) decided that London was the best choice to pursue the goal of hosting the Summer Olympics. The centrepiece of the London bid was the Lower Lea Valley, the location designated to be transformed into a world-class Olympic Park and Olympic Village. It would be connected via a high-speed shuttle service, dubbed the Olympic Javelin, and existing transport links capable of transferring 240,000 people per hour. After the Olympics and Paralympics close, the area will be transformed into the largest urban park developed in Europe for more than 150 years, with an area of 500 acres (2.0 km^{2}), and will be home to the Olympic Medical Institute (OMI), a sports medical and rehabilitation centre. The bid called for substantial improvement of the London Underground system, which was supposed to be able to handle the Olympic crowds, and more investment into new Olympic sites throughout the city. London was considered to be the second favourite for the election after Paris, but intense lobbying by the London bid team at the later stages of the bidding process swung the votes in their favour.

On 7 July 2005, the victory celebrations were marred by the terrorist attacks on London's public transport system. This prompted immediate fears concerning the security of the 2012 Games, to which the IOC and British officials reacted in a reassuring way.

=== 2012 Summer Paralympics ===
London won hosting rights to the 2012 Summer Paralympics as part of its successful bid to host the Summer Olympics. The event used many of the Olympic venues.

=== 2013 Euroleague Final Four ===
Euroleague Basketball, which operates Europe's top club competition in men's basketball, the EuroLeague (at that time branded as "Euroleague"), announced on 12 May 2012 that The O_{2} arena would host the league's Final Four on 10 and 12 May 2013.

The contract between Euroleague Basketball and O_{2} arena operator AEG included a mutual option for the venue to host the 2014 Final Four, but one or both parties decided not to exercise that option, and the 2014 Final Four was instead awarded to Milan.

=== 2013 Women's Champions League and Champions League Finals ===
The hosting of the 2011 Champions League Final at the 90,000 Wembley Stadium was deemed such a success, UEFA announced on 16 June 2011 Wembley would host the 2013 final – the first time a stadium has hosted the European Cup final twice in three years. The 2013 final would coincide with the 150th anniversary of The Football Association – the world's oldest football governing body.

As a part of its successful bid, London was also awarded the 2013 Women's Champions League Final. As in 2011, that match was held two days before the (men's) Champions League Final. This time, Stamford Bridge hosted the women's final.

=== 2013 ICC Champions Trophy ===
Three cities in the United Kingdom, London, Cardiff and Birmingham, hosted the seventh ICC Champions Trophy, which was intended to be the final edition of that event. The eight major test nations competed in the limited overs tournament, with India winning.

=== 2013 Rugby League World Cup ===
Following the success of the 2008 World Cup, the RLIF officially announced the next tournament to be held in 2013. The UK was favourites to host the sport's most prestigious event, but faced stiff competition from Australia, who had successfully hosted the 2008 competition – the most watched in rugby league's history. On 28 July 2009 the RLIF held a meeting in Singapore and, ending months of speculation, announced that the UK would host the 2013 Rugby League World Cup.

=== 2014 Amlin Challenge Cup and Heineken Cup Finals ===
Initially, the 2014 finals of the Heineken Cup and Amlin Challenge Cup were scheduled to be held in the Paris area in France. However, the French Rugby Federation pulled out of hosting because of uncertainty over the availability of Stade de France for the Heineken Cup Final. As a result, the organiser of both competitions, European Rugby Cup, reopened the bidding for both finals (which were awarded in a single package). Bids were received from all three of the Home Nations on the island of Great Britain—England, Scotland and Wales.

Ultimately, the finals were awarded to Cardiff, which had most recently hosted the finals in 2011. This was the fifth Heineken Cup Final at Millennium Stadium, and the seventh for the city (two other finals had been held at the National Stadium that previously occupied the Millennium Stadium site).

Unlike 2011, when the Challenge Cup Final was played at Cardiff City Stadium, the second-tier final was held at Cardiff Arms Park, directly adjacent to Millennium Stadium. This match was the first European final ever played on an artificial surface, as the Arms Park's main tenant, the Cardiff Blues of Pro12, installed a modern artificial pitch for the 2013–14 season.

These were the last-ever finals of the Heineken Cup and Amlin Challenge Cup. From 2014 to 2015, these competitions were replaced respectively by the European Rugby Champions Cup and European Rugby Challenge Cup.

=== 2014 Tour de France Grand Depart ===
The first three stages of the 2014 Tour de France took place in Yorkshire, Cambridgeshire, Essex and London.

=== 2014 Commonwealth Games ===
Scotland was the first country to consider hosting the 2014 Commonwealth Games in 2004, with Scottish cities being invited by the Commonwealth Games Council for Scotland to consider making a bid. In September 2004, Glasgow was announced as the Scottish candidate city over Edinburgh (which hosted the Games in 1970 and 1986, and the inaugural Commonwealth Youth Games in 2000) following a cost-benefit analysis by the Commonwealth Games Council for Scotland. The Scottish Executive under then First Minister of Scotland, Jack McConnell, with the support of the United Kingdom government and all main parties in the Scottish Parliament, formally announced Glasgow's intention to host the games on 16 August 2005.

In March 2006, the bidding process began, with the Glasgow Bid team presenting their case to the Commonwealth Games Federation at the 2006 Commonwealth Games in Melbourne, along with the other confirmed candidate cities; the Nigerian capital, Abuja and Halifax in Canada; Halifax later withdrew due to 'unacceptably high cost projections'. In October 2006, the first voting delegates arrived in Glasgow, in order to inspect the city's existing and proposed amenities and facilities. Glasgow announced on 16 January 2007, the 17 sports to be included should its bid be successful. Halifax later withdrew its bid on 8 March 2007, following the withdrawal of funding from the municipal government.

That left Abuja and Glasgow as the remaining bidders, with Abuja seen as a likely favourite due to the basis of its campaign that Africa has never before hosted the Commonwealth Games. The deadline for formal submission of bids to the Commonwealth Games Federation, in the form of a Candidate City File, was set for May 2007. Both bids were highly recommended, though Glasgow's bid team had made use of extensive benchmarking against the 2002 Commonwealth Games in Manchester and the 2006 Commonwealth Games in Melbourne and as a result, its bid was deemed technically superior according to the CGF Evaluation Report that was released in September 2007. The Commonwealth Games Evaluation Commission concluded that: "Glasgow has shown it has the ability to stage the 2014 Commonwealth Games to a standard which would continue to enhance the image and prestige of the Games." This put Glasgow ahead in terms of the technical comprehensiveness of its bid.

The final decision on the host city of the 2014 Commonwealth Games was held in Colombo, Sri Lanka on 9 November 2007 at the Commonwealth Games Federation General Assembly, attended by all 71 Commonwealth Games member associations. Each bid city made a presentation to the General Assembly, the order of which was determined by drawing lots. Glasgow's delegation was led by Louise Martin, chair of the Commonwealth Games Council for Scotland, First Minister Alex Salmond, athlete Jamie Quarry and Leader of Glasgow City Council Steven Purcell. The presentation also included a promotional film narrated by Sean Connery. Abuja's delegation was led by General Yakubu Gowon, head of the Abuja 2014 Commonwealth Games bid team. The CGF members subsequently voted for their preferred candidate in a secret ballot. As there were only two bids, the winner was announced by the CGF President, Mike Fennell, after the first round of voting, with the winner only requiring a simple majority. Celebrations were held at Glasgow's Old Fruitmarket, where a crowd of over 1,200 had gathered to watch the result live.

=== 2014 Ryder Cup ===
The 2014 Ryder Cup was held at Gleneagles in Scotland.

=== 2015 European Rugby Challenge Cup and European Rugby Champions Cup Finals ===
The inaugural finals of the new European rugby union competitions, the European Rugby Champions Cup and European Rugby Challenge Cup, were held in London. On 1 May 2015, the Twickenham Stoop hosted the final of the second-tier Challenge Cup. The following day, the adjacent Twickenham Stadium hosted the inaugural Champions Cup Final. Including finals of the former Heineken Cup and European Challenge Cup, these were the fifth European club rugby finals for each venue.

=== 2015 World Orienteering Championships ===
The 2015 World Orienteering Championships were hosted by Scotland and based in Inverness during August 2015. The World Championships were awarded on 18 August 2011 at an International Orienteering Federation press conference, beating out a bid by Sweden. The championships were previously held in Scotland on two occasions, in 1976 and 1999.

=== 2015 Rugby World Cup ===
The 2015 Rugby World Cup was hosted by England. Their winning bid included the proposed hosting of some games in Cardiff; this was officially ratified by World Rugby, then known as the International Rugby Board (IRB), on 24 May 2011. The Rugby World Cup was awarded on 28 July 2009 following the IRB Executive Board ratifying Rugby World Cup Limited's proposed decision to award the 2015 World Cup to England and the 2019 World Cup to Japan.

=== 2015 World Artistic Gymnastics Championships ===
In May 2011, it was announced that Glasgow would be the host city of the 2015 edition of the World Artistic Gymnastics Championships. The 2015 edition was the third to have been staged in the UK, and the first in Scotland, following the Glasgow bid's success over rival pitches from Paris and Orlando, Florida. The SSE Hydro, a facility designed and built for the Commonwealth Games that were held in the city a year earlier, was the primary venue for the Championships.

=== 2016 UCI Track World Championships ===
The London VeloPark in the Queen Elizabeth Olympic Park, host of the 2012 Summer Olympic track cycling, hosted the world championships in February 2016.

=== 2016 World Rugby Under 20 Championship ===
On 16 June 2015, World Rugby announced that the 2016 World Rugby Under 20 Championship (rugby union) would be held in Greater Manchester. The event used two stadia—AJ Bell Stadium in Salford and Manchester City Academy Stadium in Manchester. Since the establishment of the championship's current U20 format in 2008, this was the first time that England hosted and the second for the UK; Wales hosted the 2008 event.

=== 2016 European Swimming Championships ===
During the 2013 LEN Bureau meeting in Barcelona the 2016 European Aquatics Championships was allocated to London. This was the first major international aquatic championship in the Aquatic Centre in the Queen Elizabeth Olympic Park since the 2012 Olympic Games.

=== 2017 European Rugby Challenge Cup and European Rugby Champions Cup Finals ===
The 2017 finals of both the European Rugby Champions Cup and European Rugby Challenge Cup were hosted by Edinburgh's Murrayfield, home to the Scottish Rugby Union and the Scotland national team. On 17 June 2015, the organiser of both competitions, European Professional Club Rugby, announced the sites of the 2016 and 2017 finals of both competitions, with the 2016 finals being awarded to Lyon, France, and the 2017 finals being awarded to Edinburgh. At that time, Murrayfield was only confirmed as the site of the Champions Cup final, but on 30 March 2016 it was confirmed that Murrayfield would also host the Challenge Cup final. The 2017 Champions Cup final was the first at Murrayfield since 2009 and the third overall; the 2017 Challenge Cup final was the first ever in Scotland.

=== 2016–2018 Wheelchair Tennis Masters ===
Announced on 3 December 2012, London would be hosting the NEC Wheelchair Tennis Masters for three years starting in 2016 at Olympic Park, London.

=== 2017 ICC Champions Trophy ===
Following the 2013 Champions Trophy, the International Cricket Council planned to replace the Champions Trophy in the cricketing calendar with the ICC World Test Championship in Test cricket. This was the second time the ICC had announced this plan; it had previously intended to launch the Test Championship in 2013, with the England and Wales Cricket Board (ECB) hosting the inaugural event, but scrapped the original plans in 2011. In 2014, the ICC again cancelled the Test Championship in favour of continuing to hold the Champions Trophy, and the ECB, which had been awarded the 2017 Test Championship, was given hosting rights for the 2017 Champions Trophy as compensation.

=== 2017 World Para Athletics Championships ===
On 19 December 2012, London was announced as host of the 2017 edition of the event then known as the IPC Athletics World Championships, using the Olympic Stadium built for the 2012 Olympic Games. By the time of the event, the International Paralympic Committee, which serves as the governing body for disability athletics, had renamed the competition as the World Para Athletics Championships.

The event was spectacularly successful by the standards of previous editions of these championships. In all, 305,000 tickets were sold for the event—more than were sold for the previous eight editions of these championships combined, and only 10,000 less than Rio de Janeiro sold for athletics at the 2016 Summer Paralympics. The 2015 IPC Athletics World Championships in Qatar had total sales of only 15,000.

=== 2017 IAAF World Athletics Championships ===
On 11 March 2011 UK Athletics announced that they would submit a bid for the 2017 Athletics World Championships, whereby London would be used to host, using the Olympic Stadium built for the 2012 Olympic Games. On 11 November 2011 it was announced that the bid was successful.

=== 2017 Women's Rugby World Cup ===
The 2017 Women's Rugby World Cup was hosted by Ireland. Rugby union in Ireland is organised on an All-Ireland basis, with the Irish Rugby Football Union (IRFU) governing the sport in both the Republic of Ireland and Northern Ireland. World Rugby announced on 13 May 2015 that the IRFU had been awarded the Women's World Cup. The group stage was played in the Republic's capital of Dublin, with all knockout stage and classification matches held in Belfast. Most of the Belfast matches were held at Queen's University Belfast; both semi-finals and the final were at Ravenhill Stadium, plus two classification matches that involved the hosts.

=== 2018 IAAF Athletics World Cup ===
On 5 February 2018 British Athletics confirmed that eight of the world's top athletics nations would compete in the inaugural Athletics World Cup London 2018 at the London Stadium on 14–15 July.

=== 2018 Women's Hockey World Cup ===
Following an unsuccessful bid to host the 2014 edition of the competition, England was awarded the 2018 Women's Hockey World Cup in November 2013. This will be held at the Lee Valley Hockey and Tennis Centre – host of the 2015 EuroHockey Championships, NEC Tennis Masters from 2016 and also the 2016 Women's Hockey Champions Trophy.

=== 2019 European Rugby Challenge Cup and European Rugby Champions Cup Finals ===
The 2019 finals of both the European Rugby Champions Cup and European Rugby Challenge Cup will be hosted at St James' Park in Newcastle, normally home to Newcastle United F.C. On 3 April 2017, the organiser of both competitions, European Professional Club Rugby, announced the sites of the 2018 and 2019 finals of both competitions, with the 2018 finals being awarded to Bilbao, Spain and the 2019 finals being awarded to Newcastle. Unlike the announcement of the 2017 finals, for which Murrayfield was initially announced as hosting only the Champions Cup final and only later being confirmed as the Challenge Cup final host, St James' Park was confirmed as hosting both finals. Including finals of the predecessor to the Champions Cup, the Heineken Cup, the 2019 Champions Cup final will be the 15th in Britain and sixth in England, but the first-ever final hosted by an English stadium other than Twickenham. As for the Challenge Cup (and its predecessor, the original European Challenge Cup), this will also be the 15th final staged in the UK, and the 12th in England. St. James' Park will also be the first British stadium to host a Challenge Cup final that at the time was not the regular home to a professional club rugby team.

=== 2019 Cricket World Cup ===
The 2019 Cricket World Cup will be hosted by England and Wales. This will be the twelfth World Cup competition, and the fifth time it has been held in England, having played host in 1975, 1979, 1983 and 1999.

The hosting rights were awarded in April 2006, after England withdrew from the bidding to host the 2015 Cricket World Cup, which was held in Australia and New Zealand. In turn, those countries had been defeated by India, Pakistan, Bangladesh, and Sri Lanka for the right to stage the 2011 contest.

=== 2019 Netball World Cup ===
The 2019 Netball World Cup will be the 15th staging of the premier competition in international netball, contested every four years. The tournament will be held from 12 to 21 July 2019 at the M&S Bank Arena in Liverpool, England.

=== 2019 Solheim Cup ===
The 2019 Solheim Cup, the women's equivalent to the Ryder Cup, will be hosted by Gleneagles in Perth and Kinross, Scotland. Gleneagles beat out a rival hosting bid from Sweden. This will be the third Solheim Cup to be hosted by the UK, all three by Scotland, but the first since 2000.

== Events speculated ==
=== Super Bowl ===
In 2007, NFL commissioner Roger Goodell stated that "There is a great deal of interest in holding a Super Bowl in London". However, at that time, the earliest Super Bowl London could host would have been Super Bowl XLVII in 2013. In 2009, British media reports suggested that London was planning to submit bids for the 2014, 2015 and 2017 Super Bowls, although by that time, Goodell denied any NFL interest in a London bid. Ultimately, the 2014 game was awarded to the New Meadowlands Stadium, now known as MetLife Stadium, in East Rutherford, New Jersey (near New York City) with London not submitting a formal bid. London also did not submit a bid for the 2015 game, which was awarded to University of Phoenix Stadium in the Phoenix area. The 2017 game, which would mark the 50th anniversary of the first Super Bowl (but the 51st game in the series), was eventually awarded to NRG Stadium (previously Reliant Stadium) in Houston, also without a London bid.

== Failed/Abandoned bids ==
=== 2018 Men's Hockey World Cup ===
Following an unsuccessful bid to host the 2014 edition of the competition, England won the right to host the Women's World Cup in November 2013, culminating in finals at the Lee Valley Hockey and Tennis Centre, home of the 2012 Summer Paralympic wheelchair tennis competition. The men's World Cup was awarded to India.

=== 2018 Summer Youth Olympics ===
On 19 September 2011 it was announced that Glasgow would submit to the British Olympic Association (BOA) a proposal to bid for the 2018 Summer Youth Olympics. On 22 February 2012 the BOA agreed to put Glasgow forward as the United Kingdom's bidding city for the 2018 Summer Youth Olympics. In July 2013 they were awarded to Buenos Aires.

=== 2018 World Lacrosse Championship ===
Manchester was announced in 2013 as the host city for the 2018 World Lacrosse Championship for men. However, the sport's governing body for England, English Lacrosse, withdrew from hosting duties in May 2017, citing what it saw as an unacceptably high level of financial risk. The event ultimately took place in Netanya, Israel between 12 and 21 July 2018.

=== 2018 FIFA World Cup bid ===
It was announced on 2 December 2010 that England's bid was unsuccessful and the 2018 FIFA World Cup would be held in Russia.

=== 2017 FIFA Confederations Cup bid ===
Failed due to unsuccessful bid to host the 2018 FIFA World Cup.

=== UEFA Euro 2016 ===
In December 2006, the Football Association of Wales announced it was tentatively considering the possibility of jointly hosting the tournament with the Scottish Football Association. Scotland, along with the Republic of Ireland, bid for Euro 2008 and there has been much discussion over whether the nation should consider a solo bid for Euro 2016. The entrance into government of the Scottish National Party (SNP) had previously boosted the hopes of such an outcome.

Ultimately it was announced on 9 March 2009 that Scotland and Wales, who had planned to bid together, decided the cost of staging the event was too great. Factors sited were principally the dire economic situation and the fact that 2016 would see the tournament expand to 24 teams from 16, greatly increasing the cost of hosting.

=== 2014 Men's and Women's Hockey World Cup ===
London bid to host the men's and women's versions of the Hockey World Cup in 2014. The bid would have been only the second time both events have been held simultaneously and was planned to centre around the Olympic Hockey Centre, built for the 2012 Olympic Games, and would have been the first international event held at a 'legacy facility' in the Olympic Park after the London Olympics. Boxing promoter Frank Warren was brought in by England Hockey to help with the bid. On 11 November 2010, it was announced the Netherlands had won the bid.

=== 2015 IAAF World Athletics Championships ===
London submitted a bid to the IAAF to host the 2015 World Championships in 2010, however due to the uncertain future of the Olympic stadium at the time, the bid was moved to the 2017 World championships, leaving only Beijing in the race. The event was accordingly held in The Bird's Nest Stadium, the athletics venue for the 2008 Olympic Games.

=== 2018 Gay Games ===
London was one of three cities shortlisted to host the 2018 edition of the Gay Games, alongside Paris and Limerick. Venues would have included many of those used in the 2012 Summer Olympics, including those in the Queen Elizabeth Olympic Park, as well as The O2 Arena and SouthBank Centre. The Games were awarded to Paris.

=== 2019 World Para Athletics Championships ===
Following the success of the 2017 World Para Athletics Championships, UK Athletics announced that it would submit a bid to host the event again in 2019. London was competing against Kuala Lumpur, Malaysia for hosting rights, with a bidding deadline of 30 September 2017. However, the day before the bidding deadline, London abandoned the 2019 bid, citing scheduling issues and a lack of funding to support the bid. With Kuala Lumpur also pulling out, bidding was reopened, and the event was ultimately awarded to Dubai, United Arab Emirates.
