= 2014–15 European Rugby Champions Cup pool stage =

- Season: 2014–15 European Rugby Champions Cup
- Date: 17 October 2014 – January 2015

Qualifiers
- Seed 1: (France) Racing Métro
- Seed 2: (France) Toulon
- Seed 3: (France) Clermont
- Seed 4: (Ireland) Leinster
- Seed 5: (England) Bath
- Seed 6: (England) Northampton Saints
- Seed 7: (England) Wasps
- Seed 8: (England) Saracens

The 2014–15 European Rugby Champions Cup pool stage was the first stage of the 20th season of European club rugby union, and the first to be organised under the new European Rugby Champions Cup format, which replaced the Heineken Cup as the top European competition for clubs.

It involved 20 teams competing, across 5 pools of 4 teams, for 8 quarter-final places – which were awarded to the 5 pool winners and the 3 top-ranked pool runners-up.

The pool stage began on the weekend of 17–19 October 2014, and was completed on the weekend of 23–25 January 2015.

== Seeding ==
The 20 teams were seeded through a new system based solely on clubs' performance in their domestic leagues for the previous season, whereas the previous tournament, the Heineken Cup, seeded teams based on performance in European competition over 4 previous seasons.

- English teams were seeded by performance in the 2013–14 Aviva Premiership. Club seeding was based on regular season competition (Rounds 1 – 22) only.
- French teams were seeded by performance in the 2013–14 Top 14. Clubs were seeded based on performance in the regular season and subsequent play-off phase
- Irish, Italian, Scottish and Welsh teams were seeded by performance in the 2013–14 Pro12. Clubs were seeded based on performance in the regular season and subsequent play-offs.

Where teams were seeded based on play-off performance, if teams were eliminated in the same round of a knock-out tournament, their league position at the end of the regular season determined which team received a higher seed.

Rank	Top 14	Premiership	Pro 12
1	(France) Toulon	(England) Saracens	(Ireland) Leinster Rugby
2	(France) Castres Olympique	(England) Northampton Saints	(Scotland) Glasgow Warriors
3	(France) Montpellier	(England) Leicester Tigers	(Ireland) Munster
4	(France) Racing Métro	(England) Harlequins	(Ireland) Ulster
5	(France) Clermont	(England) Bath	(Wales) Ospreys
6	(France) Toulouse	(England) Sale Sharks	(Wales) Scarlets
7		(England) Wasps	(Italy) Benetton Treviso

Teams were then placed into 4 Tiers, each containing 5 teams, based on their seeding. A draw determined which two second seeded teams completed Tier 1, and based on this, the fourth seeded teams were allocated to either Tier 2 and Tier 3.

The brackets show each team's seeding and their league (for example, 1 Top 14 indicates the team was seeded 1st from the Top 14).

Tier 1	(Ireland) Leinster (1 Pro12)	(England) Saracens (1 AP)	(France) Toulon (1 Top 14)	(England) Northampton Saints (2 AP)	(Scotland) Glasgow Warriors (2 Pro12)
Tier 2	(France) Castres Olympique (2 Top 14)	(Ireland) Munster (3 Pro12)	(England) Leicester Tigers (3 AP)	(France) Montpellier (3 Top 14)	(France) Racing Métro (4 Top14)
Tier 3	(England) Harlequins (4 AP)	(Ireland) Ulster (4 Pro12)	(Wales) Ospreys (5 Pro12)	(England) Bath (5 AP)	(France) Clermont (5 Top 14)
Tier 4	(Wales) Scarlets (6 Pro12)	(England) Sale Sharks (6 AP)	(France) Toulouse (6 Top 14)	(England) Wasps (7 Play-off)	(Italy) Benetton Treviso (7 Pro12)

== Pool stage ==
The draw took place on 10 June 2014, at the Stade de la Maladière in Neuchâtel.

Teams played each other twice, both at home and away, in the group stage, that began on the weekend of 17–19 October 2014, and continued through to 23–25 January 2015.

The pool stage of the competition used the same competition point system as previous European competitions, where, based on the result of the match, teams receive:

- 4 points for a win,
- 2 points for a draw,
- 1 attacking bonus point for scoring four or more tries in a match,
- 1 defensive bonus point for losing a match by seven points or less.

Based on these competition points, the five pool winners from each group progressed to the quarter-finals, along with the three best pool runners-up from the competition. If at any point in the competition there was a tie between two or more teams from the same pool, the following criteria were used as tie-breakers:

1. The club with the greater number of competition points from only matches involving tied teams.
2. If equal, the club that scored the most tries in those matches.
3. If equal, the club with the best aggregate points difference from those matches.

If this did not separate teams, and/or the tie related to teams that did not play each other (i.e., in different pools), the following tie breakers were used:

1. The club that scored the most tries in the pool stage.
2. If equal, the club with the best aggregate points difference from the pool stage.
3. If equal, the club with the fewest players suspended in the pool stage.
4. If equal, the drawing of lots will determine a club's ranking.

Fixtures were announced on Thursday 14 August 2014. Alongside the exact dates and kick-off times for rounds 1 and 2. Exact times for Rounds 3 and 4 were announced 10 October 2014, and for Rounds 5 and 6 were announced 19 December 2014.

Key to colours
Winner of each pool, advance to quarter-finals.
Three highest-scoring second-place teams advance to quarter-finals.

=== Pool 1 ===
Team	P	W	D	L	PF	PA	Diff	TF	TA	TB	LB	Pts
(France) Clermont (3)	6	5	0	1	140	80	+60	14	6	1	1	22
(England) Saracens (8)	6	4	0	2	119	95	+24	12	10	1	0	17
(Ireland) Munster	6	3	0	3	144	114	+30	15	11	1	2	15
(England) Sale Sharks	6	0	0	6	82	196	−114	8	22	0	2	2

18 October 2014
13:00

(1 BP) Sale Sharks (England)	26–27	(Ireland) Munster
Try: Lund 23' c Leota 28' c Con: Cipriani (2/2) 25', 29'; Pen: Cipriani (4/4) 6', 15', 18', 68'	Report	Try: Kilcoyne 9' c Conway 55' c Murray 64' c Con: Keatley (3/3) 10', 56', 65'; Pen: Keatley (1/1) 71'; Drop: Keatley (1/1) 80'

AJ Bell Stadium
Attendance: 9,879
Referee: Mathieu Raynal (FFR)

18 October 2014
15:15

(1 BP) Saracens (England)	30–23	(France) Clermont (1 BP)
Try: Ashton (2) 3' m, 62' c Strettle (2) 27' m, 48' c Con: Hodgson (2/4) 49', 63'; Pen: Hodgson (2/3) 44', 56'	Report	Try: Guildford (2) 9' c, 46' c Con: Lopez (2/2) 9', 47'; Pen: Lopez (2/3) 14', 51'; Drop: Lopez (1/1) 45'

Allianz Park
Attendance: 9,902
Referee: John Lacey (IRFU)

24 October 2014
19:45

Munster (Ireland)	14–3	(England) Saracens
Try: Kilcoyne 60' m Pen: Keatley (2/5) 26', 53'; Drop: Keatley (1/1) 65'	Report	Pen: Farrell (1/1) 37'

Thomond Park
Attendance: 26,000
Referee: Jérôme Garcès (FFR)

26 October 2014
16:15

(1 BP) Clermont (France)	35–3	(England) Sale Sharks
Try: Abendanon 15' c Nalaga (2) 52' c, 74' c Rougerie 76' c Con: Lopez (3/4) 15', 74', 76'; Pen: Lopez (3/3) 27', 31', 50'	Report	Pen: Cipriani (1/1) 18'

Stade Marcel-Michelin
Attendance: 17,591
Referee: George Clancy (IRFU)

6 December 2014
13:00

(1 BP) Sale Sharks (England)	15–19	(England) Saracens
Try: Lund 7' c Ostrikov 61' m Con: Cipriani (1/2) 7'; Pen: Cipriani (1/1) 32'	Report	Try: Farrell 14' m Vunipola 44' m Pen: Hodgson (1/1) 4'; Farrell (1/1) 35'; Drop: Farrell (1/2) 65'

AJ Bell Stadium
Attendance: 7,053
Referee: Leighton Hodges (WRU)

6 December 2014
17:30

(1 BP) Munster (Ireland)	9–16	(France) Clermont
Pen: Keatley (3/3) 15', 26', 61'	Report	Try: Lee 1' m Fofana 21' m Pen: Lopez (1/2) 30'; Drop: Lopez (1/1) 34'

Thomond Park
Attendance: 25,600
Referee: Wayne Barnes (RFU)

13 December 2014
17:15

Saracens (England)	28–15	(England) Sale Sharks
Try: Goode 35' m Ransom 57' c B. Vunipola 74' c Con: Farrell (2/3) 59', 75'; Pen: Farrell (2/2) 13', 18'	Report	Try: Hines 21' m Lewis-Roberts 78' c Con: Ford (1/1) 80'; Pen: Macleod (1/1) 40'

Allianz Park
Attendance: 7,561
Referee: Jérôme Garcès (FFR)

14 December 2014
16:15

Clermont (France)	26–19	(Ireland) Munster (1 BP)
Try: Chouly (2) 18' m, 72' m Nakaitaci 40' c Con: Lopez (1/3) 40'; Pen: Lopez (3/4) 26', 45', 59'	Report	Try: Casey 75' c Con: Keatley (1/1) 75'; Pen: Keatley (4/4) 5', 12', 42', 82'

Stade Marcel-Michelin
Attendance: 17,723
Referee: Nigel Owens (WRU)

17 January 2015
13:00

Saracens (England)	33–10	(Ireland) Munster
Try: Wyles 20' c Ashton (2) 35' c, 73' c Con: Farrell (3/3) 22', 36', 74'; Pen: Farrell (4/5) 8', 29', 40', 57'	Report	Try: Hurley 69' c Con: Keatley (1/1) 69'; Pen: Keatley (1/1) 32'

Allianz Park
Attendance: 9,999
Referee: Romain Poite (FFR) /
Christophe Berdos (FFR)

- Note: Original referee Poite, was injured during the 73rd minute, and Berdos replaced him for remainder of the match.

17 January 2015
17:30

Sale Sharks (England)	13–22	(France) Clermont
Try: Penalty try 50' c Con: Cipriani (1/1) 51'; Pen: Cipriani (2/3) 12', 64'	Report	Try: Lee 75' c Con: Lopez (1/1) 76'; Pen: Lopez (5/5) 9', 37', 56', 60', 68'

AJ Bell Stadium
Attendance: 6,108
Referee: Ian Davies (WRU)

25 January 2015
15:15

(1 BP) Munster (Ireland)	65–10	(England) Sale Sharks
Try: Zebo (2) 1' c, 67' m Earls 41' c Penalty try 53' c Howard 64' c Conway (2) 68' m, 79' c O'Donnell 72' c Williams 76' c Con: Keatley (4/5) 2', 41', 54', 65'; Hanrahan (3/4) 73', 77', 80'; Pen: Keatley (2/3) 6', 10'	Report	Try: Arscott 11' c Con: Macleod (1/1) 12'; Pen: Macleod (1/1) 8'

Thomond Park
Attendance: 17,685
Referee: Marius Mitrea (FIR)

25 January 2015
16:15

Clermont (France)	18–6	(England) Saracens
Try: Abendanon 30' c Debaty 52' m Con: Lopez (1/2) 31'; Pen: Lopez (1/1) 7'; James (1/1) 77'	Report	Pen: Hodgson (2/3) 39', 49'

Stade Marcel-Michelin
Attendance: 17,787
Referee: George Clancy (IRFU)

=== Pool 2 ===
Team	P	W	D	L	PF	PA	Diff	TF	TA	TB	LB	Pts
(Ireland) Leinster (4)	6	4	1	1	148	101	+47	13	9	1	1	20
(England) Wasps (7)	6	3	1	2	155	105	+50	18	12	2	2	18
(England) Harlequins	6	4	0	2	135	99	+36	13	7	1	1	18
(France) Castres Olympique	6	0	0	6	86	219	−133	10	26	0	1	1

17 October 2014
19:45

Harlequins (England)	25–9	(France) Castres Olympique
Try: Care 65' c Con: Evans (1/1) 66'; Pen: Evans (6/6) 22', 44', 53', 60', 74', 77'	Report	Pen: Kockott (3/3) 6', 50', 68'

The Stoop
Attendance: 12,618
Referee: Nigel Owens (WRU)

19 October 2014
17:15

Leinster (Ireland)	25–20	(England) Wasps (1 BP)
Try: Fanning (2) 28' m, 52' c Ryan 61' c Con: Madigan (2/3) 53', 61'; Pen: Madigan (2/2) 6', 40'	Report	Try: Leiua 23' c Wade 34' c Con: Goode (2/2) 24', 35'; Pen: Goode (2/3) 12', 21'

RDS Arena
Attendance: 17,558
Referee: Leighton Hodges (WRU)

26 October 2014
14:00

(1 BP) Castres Olympique (France)	16–21	(Ireland) Leinster
Try: Taumoepeau 5' c Con: Palis (1/1) 6'; Pen: Palis (3/4) 42', 53', 56'	Report	Pen: Madigan (7/9) 16', 25',37', 63', 70', 76', 79'

Stade Pierre-Antoine
Attendance: 9,387
Referee: Greg Garner (RFU)

26 October 2014
17:15

(1 BP) Wasps (England)	16–23	(England) Harlequins
Try: Simpson 31' c Con: Goode (1/1) 32'; Pen: Goode (3/3) 19', 49', 58'	Report	Try: Matthews 38' c Penalty try 62' c Con: N.Evans (2/2) 38', 63'; Pen: N.Evans (3/5) 11', 21', 42'

Adams Park
Attendance: 6,739
Referee: Marius Mitrea (FIR)

7 December 2014
14:00

Castres Olympique (France)	17–32	(England) Wasps (1 BP)
Try: Bonello 10' c Lamerat 33' c Con: Kockott (2/2) 11', 34'; Pen: Dumora (1/1) 66'	Report	Try: Miller 5' c Hughes 13' m Penalty try 70' c Tagicakibau 74' c Con: Goode (3/4) 6'. 71', 74'; Pen: Goode (2/2) 26', 69'

Stade Pierre-Antoine
Attendance: 7,204
Referee: George Clancy (IRFU)

7 December 2014
15:15

Harlequins (England)	24–18	(Ireland) Leinster (1 BP)
Try: Easter 53' c Tikoirotuma 59' m Con: Swiel (1/2) 53'; Pen: Evans (1/1) 7'; Swiel (2/3) 19', 35'; Drop: Care (1/1) 74'	Report	Pen: Madigan (6/6) 4', 25', 39', 47', 67', 70'

The Stoop
Attendance: 14,800
Referee: Jérôme Garcès (FFR)

13 December 2014
19:45

Leinster (Ireland)	14–13	(England) Harlequins (1 BP)
Try: Boss 30' m Con: Madigan (0/1); Pen: Madigan (3/4) 25', 37', 71'	Report	Try: Brown 56' c Con: Swiel (1/1) 57'; Pen: Swiel (2/4) 45', 66'

Aviva Stadium
Attendance: 38,500
Referee: Romain Poite (FFR)

14 December 2014
13:00

(1 BP) Wasps (England)	44–17	(France) Castres Olympique
Try: Cooper-Woolley 4' m Hughes 23' m Varndell (2) 31' m, 56' m Jacobs (2) 38' c, 80' c Thompson 73' m Con: Goode (1/5) 38'; Lozowski (2/2) 74', 80+1'; Pen: Goode (1/2) 7'	Report	Try: Rallier 29' m Evans 53' m Houerie 77' c Con: Palis (1/1) 78'

Adams Park
Attendance: 6,507
Referee: John Lacey (IRFU)

Note:

- This was Wasps' last match played at Adams Park, their home ground since 2002, before moving to Ricoh Arena.

17 January 2015
17:30

(1 BP) Leinster (Ireland)	50–8	(France) Castres Olympique
Try: D. Kearney 2' c Moore 27' c Reddan 35' c Cronin 39' c Furlong 56' c Fanning 67' m McGrath 77' c Con: Madigan (6/7) 4', 28', 36', 40', 57', 78'; Pen: Madigan (1/1) 23'	Report	Try: Martial 69' m Pen: Kockott (1/1) 21'

RDS Arena
Attendance: 18,018
Referee: Marius Mitrea (FIR)

17 January 2015
19:45

Harlequins (England)	3–23	(England) Wasps
Pen: Botica (1/1) 45'	Report	Try: Wade 11' c Simpson 19' c Con: Goode (2/2) 11', 20'; Pen: Goode (2/2) 3', 41'; Daly (1/1) 53'

The Stoop
Attendance: 14,132
Referee: Nigel Owens (WRU)

24 January 2015
13:00

Wasps (England)	20–20	(Ireland) Leinster
Try: Mullan 61' c Hughes 68' c Con: Goode (2/2) 62', 70'; Pen: Goode (2/3) 6', 31'	Report	Try: McFadden 2' c Boss 37' c Con: Madigan (2/2) 4', 38'; Pen: Madigan (2/2) 20', 29’

Ricoh Arena
Attendance: 23,493
Referee: Jérôme Garcès (FFR)

24 January 2015
14:00

Castres Olympique (France)	19–47	(England) Harlequins (1 BP)
Try: Dupont 19' c Cabannes 33' c Beattie 65' m Con: Dumora (2/3) 20', 34'	Report	Try: Marler 11' c Walker 25' c Care 40+3' c Clifford 48' c Lambert 56' c Yarde 58' m Lowe 78' c Con: Evans (6/7) 12', 26', 40+4', 49', 57', 79'

Stade Pierre-Antoine
Attendance: 6,800
Referee: Peter Fitzgibbon (IRFU)

=== Pool 3 ===
Team	P	W	D	L	PF	PA	Diff	TF	TA	TB	LB	Pts
(France) Toulon (2)	6	5	0	1	181	89	+92	19	9	1	1	22
(England) Leicester Tigers	6	3	0	3	108	126	−18	12	15	1	0	13
(Ireland) Ulster	6	2	0	4	116	146	−30	16	15	3	1	12
(Wales) Scarlets	6	2	0	4	90	134	−44	8	16	0	0	8

18 October 2014
19:45

Leicester Tigers (England)	25–18	(Ireland) Ulster (1 BP)
Try: O. Williams 15' c Kitchener 28' m Burns 31' c Con: Burns (1/2) 16'; O. Williams (1/1) 33'; Pen: O. Williams (2/2) 44', 62'	Report	Try: Bowe 55'c Van der Merwe 66' m Con: Jackson (1/2) 56'; Pen: Jackson (2/3) 8', 48'

Welford Road
Attendance: 19,943
Referee: Romain Poite (FFR)

19 October 2014
16:15

Toulon (France)	28–18	(Wales) Scarlets
Try: Giteau 18' m Mermoz 31' c S. Armitage 72' c Con: Halfpenny (2/3) 31', 72'; Pen: Halfpenny (3/3) 7', 40', 66'	Report	Try: Barclay 27' c K. Phillips 80' m Con: Priestland (1/2) 28'; Pen: Priestland (2/3) 15', 37'

Stade Mayol
Attendance: 14,391
Referee: JP Doyle (RFU)

25 October 2014
13:00

Ulster (Ireland)	13–23	(France) Toulon
Try: Gilroy 77' c Con: Jackson (1/1) 77'; Pen: Jackson (2/2) 21', 46'	Report	Try: Habana 40' c D. Armitage 58' c Con: Halfpenny (2/2) 40', 59'; Pen: Halfpenny (3/5) 9', 13', 39'

Kingspan Stadium
Attendance: 16,931
Referee: Wayne Barnes (RFU)

25 October 2014
19:45

Scarlets (Wales)	15–3	(England) Leicester Tigers
Try: Robinson 17' m A. Davies 61' c Con: S. Shingler (1/2) 62'; Pen: S. Shingler (1/2) 31'	Report	Pen: Williams (1/2) 13'

Parc y Scarlets
Attendance: 8,235
Referee: John Lacey (IRFU)

6 December 2014
19:45

(1 BP) Ulster (Ireland)	24–9	(Wales) Scarlets
Try: Cave 14' c Pienaar 18' c Bowe 59' m Best 68' m Con: Humphreys (2/4) 15', 19'	Report	Pen: Priestland (3/4) 3', 29', 55'

Kingspan Stadium
Attendance: 15,946
Referee: Luke Pearce (RFU)

7 December 2014
17:30

Leicester Tigers (England)	25–21	(France) Toulon (1 BP)
Try: Thorn 18' c Con: O. Williams (1/1) 20'; Pen: O. Williams (6/8) 6', 15', 45', 57', 64', 79'	Report	Try: Habana 34' c Mitchell 49' m Con: Sánchez (1/2) 35'; Pen: Sánchez (3/4) 22', 31', 69'

Welford Road
Attendance: 22,114
Referee: Nigel Owens (WRU)

13 December 2014
16:15

Toulon (France)	23–8	(England) Leicester Tigers
Try: Williams 10' c Bastareaud 54' c Con: Halfpenny (2/2) 11', 55'; Pen: Halfpenny (3/4) 5', 14', 24'	Report	Try: Scully 26' m Pen: O. Williams (1/2) 57'

Stade Mayol
Attendance: 15,045
Referee: George Clancy (IRFU)

14 December 2014
17:15

Scarlets (Wales)	22–13	(Ireland) Ulster
Try: J. Davies 78' c Con: Priestland (1/1) 79'; Pen: Priestland (5/8) 11', 19', 28', 33', 60'	Report	Try: Cave 41' c Con: Humphreys (1/1) 42'; Pen: Pienaar (2/3) 69', 72'

Parc y Scarlets
Attendance: 7,230
Referee: JP Doyle (RFU)

16 January 2015
19:45

(1 BP) Leicester Tigers (England)	40–23	(Wales) Scarlets
Try: Benjamin 9' c Crane 14' c Thompstone 46' m T. Youngs (2) 52' c, 57' c Harrison 68' c Con: Burns (4/5) 10', 15', 53', 58'; Williams (1/1) 69'	Report	Try: R. Evans 33' m Robinson (2) 59' m, 73' c Con: S. Shingler (1/2) 74'; Pen: Priestland (2/2) 5', 20'

Welford Road
Attendance: 18,913
Referee: Pascal Gaüzère (FFR)

17 January 2015
16:15

(1 BP) Toulon (France)	60–22	(Ireland) Ulster (1 BP)
Try: Sánchez 2' c Habana 31' c Bastareaud 36' c Castrogiovanni 49' c S. Armitage (3) 57' c, 64' c, 78' m Gorgodze 59' c Con: Halfpenny (7/8) 3', 32', 37', 51', 58', 60', 65'; Pen: Halfpenny (2/2) 9', 18'	Report	Try: Jackson 11' m McComish (2) 21' m, 76' c Payne 68' m Con: Pienaar (1/2) 77'

Stade Mayol
Attendance: 13,781
Referee: Leighton Hodges (WRU)

24 January 2015
17:30

Scarlets (Wales)	3–26	(France) Toulon
Pen: S. Shingler (1/1) 29'	Report	Try: Bastareaud 3' c Habana 50' c Con: Halfpenny (2/2) 4', 52'; Pen: Halfpenny (3/4) 9', 18', 33'; Drop: Halfpenny 21'

Parc y Scarlets
Attendance: 9,267
Referee: Wayne Barnes (RFU)

24 January 2015
17:30

(1 BP) Ulster (Ireland)	26–7	(England) Leicester Tigers
Try: Cave (3) 19' m, 38' c, 42' c, Gilroy 49' c Con: Pienaar (3/4) 38', 44', 51'	Report	Try: Thompstone 53' c Con: Burns (1/1) 54'

Kingspan Stadium
Attendance: 15,659
Referee: Pascal Gaüzère (FFR)

=== Pool 4 ===
Team	P	W	D	L	PF	PA	Diff	TF	TA	TB	LB	Pts
(England) Bath (5)	6	4	0	2	146	108	+38	15	15	2	1	19
(France) Toulouse	6	4	0	2	126	124	+2	11	10	0	1	17
(Scotland) Glasgow Warriors	6	3	0	3	108	84	+24	11	6	1	2	15
(France) Montpellier	6	1	0	5	90	154	−64	9	15	0	2	6

18 October 2014
15:15

(1 BP) Glasgow Warriors (Scotland)	37–10	(England) Bath
Try: Bennett (2) 10' c 70' c Maitland 28'; Seymour 36'; Matawalu 65' c Con: Weir (3/5) 11', 67', 71'; Pen: Weir (2/3) 17', 23'	Report	Try: Joseph 12'; Con: Ford (1/1) 13'; Pen: Ford (1/1) 3'

Scotstoun Stadium
Attendance: 6,746
Referee: Jérôme Garcès (FFR)

19 October 2014
14:00

Toulouse (France)	30–23	(France) Montpellier (1 BP)
Try: Huget (2) 39' c, 53' c Doussain 65' c Con: McAlister (1/1) 40'; Flood (2/2) 54', 67'; Pen: McAlister (2/3) 10', 37'; Flood (1/2) 79'	Report	Try: Nagusa 33' c Olivier 50' c Con: Iribaren (1/1) 34'; Selponi (1/1) 52'; Pen: Iribaren (2/2) 7', 62'; Paillaugue (1/1) 80'

Stade Ernest-Wallon
Attendance: 14,500
Referee: Wayne Barnes (RFU)

25 October 2014
15:15

(1 BP) Bath (England)	19–21	(France) Toulouse
Try: Batty 74' c Con: Ford (1/1) 74'; Pen: Ford (3/3) 4', 45', 52'; Drop: Ford (1/1) 30'	Report	Try: Clerc 13' c Harinordoquy 47' c Medard 64' c Con: Flood (2/2) 14', 48'; McAlister (1/1) 65'

Recreation Ground
Attendance: 13,360
Referee: Nigel Owens (WRU)

25 October 2014
17:15

(1 BP) Montpellier (France)	13–15	(Scotland) Glasgow Warriors
Try: Penalty try 80+5'; Con: Iribaren (1/1) 80+5'; Pen: Paillaugue (1/4) 15', 31'	Report	Pen: Russell (5/5) 1', 12', 18', 59', 63'

Altrad Stadium
Attendance: 11,089
Referee: JP Doyle (RFU)

5 December 2014
20:45

Montpellier (France)	5–30	(England) Bath
Try: Tulou 68' m	Report	Try: Thomas 34' c Penalty try 38' c Houston 49' c Con: Ford (3/3) 35', 39', 50'; Pen: Ford (2/3) 22', 29'; Drop: Ford (1/1) 10'

Altrad Stadium
Attendance: 5,000
Referee: Ian Davies (WRU)

7 December 2014
16:15

Toulouse (France)	19–11	(Scotland) Glasgow Warriors
Try: Médard 41' c Con: Bézy (1/1) 41'; Pen: Bézy (4/4) 18', 36', 40', 62'	Report	Try: Matawalu 77' m Pen: Russell (2/2) 24', 54'

Stade Ernest-Wallon
Attendance: 16,670
Referee: John Lacey (IRFU)

12 December 2014
19:45

(1 BP) Bath (England)	32–12	(France) Montpellier
Try: Banahan (3) 4' c, 13' c, 51' m Agulla 78' c Con: Ford (3/4) 3', 14', 78'; Pen: Ford (2/2) 6', 43'	Report	Try: Tulou 61' m Ivaldi 73' c Con: Paillaugue (1/2) 74'

Recreation Ground
Attendance: 13,282
Referee: Marius Mitrea (FIR)

13 December 2014
13:00

(1 BP) Glasgow Warriors (Scotland)	9–12	(France) Toulouse
Pen: Russell (1/3) 12'; Weir (2/2) 65', 73'	Report	Pen: Bézy (4/4) 8', 20', 48', 58'

Scotstoun Stadium
Attendance: 6,894
Referee: Wayne Barnes (RFU)

18 January 2015
13:00

Glasgow Warriors (Scotland)	21–10	(France) Montpellier
Try: Van der Merwe (3) 12' c, 57' c, 68' c Con: Russell (3/3) 13', 58', 69'	Report	Try: Privat 18' c Con: Lucas (1/1) 19'; Pen: Lucas (1/1) 6'

Scotstoun Stadium
Attendance: 6,056
Referee: Luke Pearce (RFU)

18 January 2015
16:15

Toulouse (France)	18–35	(England) Bath (1 BP)
Try: Maestri 12' c Huget 35' m Con: Flood (1/2) 13'; Pen: Flood (2/2) 39', 47'	Report	Try: Banahan 6' c Cook 23' m Joseph 26' c Louw 70' c Con: Ford (3/4) 7', 27', 72'; Pen: Ford (3/3) 1', 33', 80+1'

Stade Ernest-Wallon
Attendance: 16,061
Referee: George Clancy (IRFU)

25 January 2015
13:00

Bath (England)	20–15	(Scotland) Glasgow Warriors (1 BP)
Try: Penalty try (2) 52' c, 66' c Con: Ford (1/1) 52'; Devoto (1/1) 66'; Pen: Ford (2/4) 29', 34'	Report	Try: Dunbar 4' c Vernon 48' m Con: Russell (1/2) 5'; Pen: Russell (1/1) 55'

Recreation Ground
Attendance: 13,349
Referee: John Lacey (IRFU)

25 January 2015
14:00

Montpellier (France)	27–26	(France) Toulouse (1 BP)
Try: Dupont (2) 45' c, 48' m Con: Lucas (1/2) 46'; Pen: Lucas (3/4) 2', 31', 67'; Paillaugue (2/2) 25', 61'	Report	Try: Poitrenaud 28' c Flood 42' c Con: McAlister (1/1) 29'; Flood (1/1) 43'; Pen: McAlister (2/4) 33', 40'; Flood (2/2) 58', 65'

Altrad Stadium
Attendance: 10,467
Referee: Greg Garner (RFU)

=== Pool 5 ===
Team	P	W	D	L	PF	PA	Diff	TF	TA	TB	LB	Pts
(France) Racing Métro (1)	6	5	1	0	168	69	+99	20	7	2	0	24
(England) Northampton Saints (6)	6	4	0	2	178	82	+96	25	8	3	0	19
(Wales) Ospreys	6	1	1	4	110	121	−11	11	13	1	2	9
(Italy) Benetton Treviso	6	1	0	5	62	246	−184	8	36	0	0	4

18 October 2014
18:15

Racing Métro 92 (France)	20–11	(England) Northampton Saints
Try: Dumoulin 4' c Andreu 79' c Con: Sexton (1/1) 37'; Goosen (1/1) 80'; Pen: Sexton (2/3) 37', 68'	Report	Try: Dowson 75' m Pen: Myler (2/2) 30', 43'

Stade Yves-du-Manoir
Attendance: 9,180
Referee: George Clancy (IRFU)

19 October 2014
13:00

(1 BP) Ospreys (Wales)	42–7	(Italy) Benetton Treviso
Try: Hassler 21' c Webb 33' c D. Evans (2) 46' c, 62' m Baker 53' m Con: Biggar (4/5) 22', 34', 47', 54'; Pen: Biggar (3/3) 5', 8', 13'	Report	Try: Nitoglia 77' c Con: Carlisle (1/1) 77'

Liberty Stadium
Attendance: 7,625
Referee: Pascal Gauzère (FFR)

25 October 2014
17:15

(1 BP) Northampton Saints (England)	34–6	(Wales) Ospreys
Try: North (4) 16' c, 30' c, 54' c, 76' c Con: Myler (4/4) 17', 31', 55', 78'; Pen: Myler (2/2) 4', 37'	Report	Pen: Biggar (2/5) 9', 47'

Franklin's Gardens
Attendance: 13,362
Referee: Romain Poite (FFR)

26 October 2014
18:15

Benetton Treviso (Italy)	10–26	(France) Racing Métro 92
Try: Nitoglia 62' c Con: Hayward (1/1) 63'; Pen: Hayward (1/2) 21'	Report	Try: Chavancy 42' c Lauret 74' c Con: Sexton (2/2) 43', 75'; Pen: Sexton (4/4) 9', 33', 56', 67'

Stadio Comunale di Monigo
Attendance: 3,711
Referee: Luke Pearce (RFU)

6 December 2014
14:00

Benetton Treviso (Italy)	15–38	(England) Northampton Saints (1 BP)
Try: Nitoglia 56' c Carlisle 72' m Con: Carlisle (1/2) 56'; Pen: Carlisle (1/2) 18'	Report	Try: Manoa 9' c Waller 33' m Foden 47' c Burrell 49' c Penalty try 64' c Pisi 80' m Con: Myler (4/6) 9', 47', 49', 64'

Stadio Comunale di Monigo
Attendance: 3,786
Referee: Peter Fitzgibbon (IRFU)

6 December 2014
15:15

Ospreys (Wales)	19–19	(France) Racing Métro 92
Try: Matavesi 74' c Con: Biggar (1/1) 74'; Pen: Biggar (4/5) 14', 30', 48', 52'	Report	Try: Van der Merwe 18' c Con: Goosen (1/1) 18'; Pen: Goosen (3/5) 5', 12', 26'; Drop: Goosen (1/2) 73'

Liberty Stadium
Attendance: 7,164
Referee: JP Doyle (RFU)

13 December 2014
15:15

(1 BP) Northampton Saints (England)	67–0	(Italy) Benetton Treviso
Try: Penalty Try 11' c North 16' c Fotuali'i 21' m K. Pisi (3) 33' m, 45' c, 75' m G. Pisi 42' c Manoa (3) 61' m, 65' c, 72' c Foden 77' m Con: Myler (4/6) 12', 18', 43', 46'; Wilson (2/5) 66', 73'	Report

Franklin's Gardens
Attendance: 13,344
Referee: Pascal Gaüzère (FFR)

13 December 2014
18:15

Racing Métro 92 (France)	18–14	(Wales) Ospreys (1 BP)
Try: Imhoff 26' c Thomas 29' m Con: Goosen (1/2) 28'; Pen: Goosen (2/2) 11', 80'	Report	Try: Webb 51' c Walker 70' c Con: Biggar (2/2) 52', 71'

MMArena
Attendance: 16,258
Referee: Greg Garner (RFU)

18 January 2015
17:30

Ospreys (Wales)	9–20	(England) Northampton Saints
Pen: Biggar (3/3) 8', 18', 33'	Report	Try: Clark 15' c North 37' c Con: Myler (2/2) 15', 39'; Pen: Myler (2/3) 25', 67'

Liberty Stadium
Attendance: 7,308
Referee: Jérôme Garcès (FFR)

18 January 2015
18:30

(1 BP) Racing Métro 92 (France)	53–7	(Italy) Benetton Treviso
Try: Chavancy 9' c Lapeyre (2) 29' c, 78' m Szarzewski (3) 36' m, 41' m, 54' m Imhoff (2) 60' c, 70' m Penalty try 68' c Con: Machenaud (2/4) 10', 30'; Dambielle (2/4) 61', 68'; Lapeyre (0/1)	Report	Try: Campagnaro 57' c Con: Carlisle (1/1) 58'

Stade Yves-du-Manoir
Attendance: 5,817
Referee: JP Doyle (RFU)

24 January 2015
15:15

Northampton Saints (England)	8–32	(France) Racing Métro 92 (1 BP)
Try: North 48' m Con: Myler (0/1); Pen: Myler (1/2) 22'	Report	Try: Imhoff (2) 40' m, 41' c Lapeyre 44' c Roberts 60' c Con: Machenaud (2/3) 42', 45'; Dambielle (1/1) 61'; Pen: Machenaud (2/2) 14', 17'

Franklin's Gardens
Attendance: 13,362
Referee: Nigel Owens (WRU)

24 January 2015
16:15

Benetton Treviso (Italy)	23–20	(Wales) Ospreys (1 BP)
Try: Esposito 26' m Barbini 40' m Penalty try 80' c Con: Hayward (1/3) 80'; Pen: Hayward (2/2) 21', 38'	Report	Try: King 6' c Walker 33' m Fussell 69' m Con: Davies (1/3) 7'; Pen: Davies (1/2) 51'

Stadio Comunale di Monigo
Attendance: 2,780
Referee: Mathieu Raynal (FFR)

== See also ==
- 2014–15 European Rugby Champions Cup
