= Golden Decade =

Golden Decade may refer to either of the following:

- Chuck Berry's Golden Decade, a three-volume compilation album of music by American rock icon Chuck Berry
- The "Golden Decade in British Sport", a term reflecting the large number of major international sporting events to be hosted by the United Kingdom in the 2010s
- Nanjing decade, also Nanking decade, or The Golden decade
