= 2015 European Rugby Champions Cup final =

2015 European Rugby Champions Cup Final
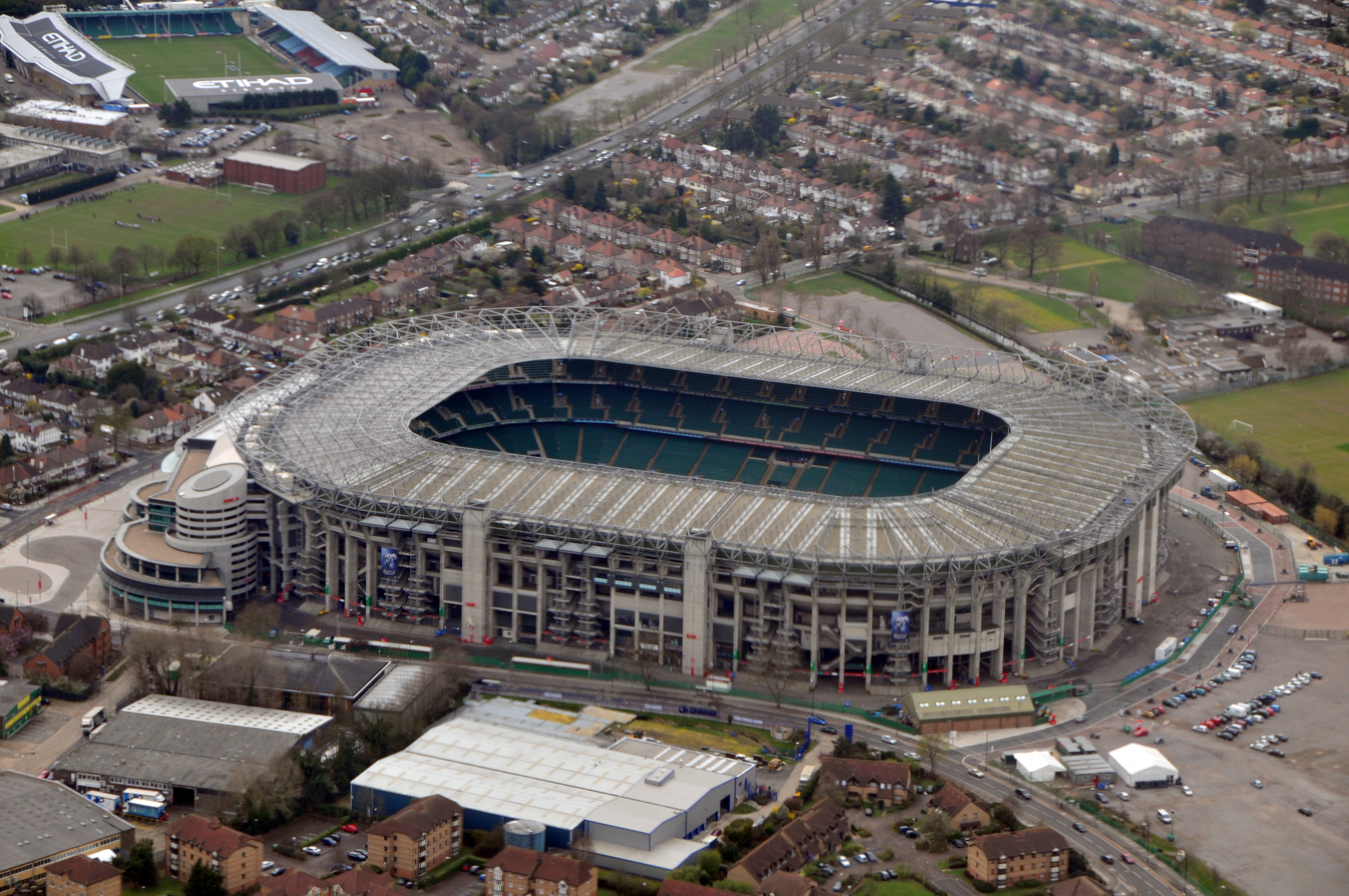
- Twickenham Stadium hosted the final
- Event: 2014–15 European Rugby Champions Cup
Clermont	Toulon
(France)	(France)
18	24
- Date: 2 May 2015
- Venue: Twickenham Stadium, London
- Man of the Match: Ali Williams (Toulon)
- Referee: Nigel Owens (Wales)
- Attendance: 56,622

The 2015 European Rugby Champions Cup Final was the final match in the first European Rugby Champions Cup, and the twentieth European club rugby final in general, as the competition replaces the Heineken Cup.

The final was played between the French clubs Clermont and Toulon at Twickenham Stadium on 2 May 2015.

Toulon won the final, beating Clermont by 24 points to 18. This was the third successive win by Toulon of the top European club rugby competition.

== Background ==
In the Heineken Cup (1995–2014), Toulon won twice, the two last editions of the tournament (2013 and 2014). The first of those finals was also Clermont's only final, and Toulon won 16–15 at the Aviva Stadium in Dublin, Ireland. In 2014, Toulon won 23–6 against England's Saracens at the Millennium Stadium in Cardiff, Wales.

== Venue and ticketing ==
Following a competitive tendering process, the tournament organisers, European Professional Club Rugby, announced in August 2014 that the final would be held in the 82,000 capacity Twickenham Stadium, London on 2 May 2015. The scheduling makes it the earliest in the season that the European final has been held since the 1999 Heineken Cup Final, and is two weeks after the semi-finals are held, providing limited opportunity for supporters of the two finalists to make arrangements to attend. Around 8000 supporters of the two clubs involved in the final travelled to Twickenham, with part of their allocations being returned.

Efforts were made to try and boost attendance by offering free tickets to the final to those that purchased tickets to the Aviva Premiership final that was to be held in the same venue later in the month. However, a technical issue meant that the requirement to purchase the Premiership final tickets was not initially enforced, meaning customers could order only the free ticket and pay just a booking fee.

== Route to Final ==
Note: In all results below, the score of the finalist is given first (H: home; A: away).

(France) Clermont Auvergne		Round	(France) Toulon	
Opponent	Result	Pool stage	Opponent	Result
(England) Saracens	23–30 (A)	Matchday 1	(Wales) Scarlets	28–18 (H)
(England) Sale Sharks	35–3 (H)	Matchday 2	(Ireland) Ulster	23–13 (A)
(Ireland) Munster	16–9 (A)	Matchday 3	(England) Leicester Tigers	21–25 (A)
(Ireland) Munster	26–19 (H)	Matchday 4	(England) Leicester Tigers	23–8 (H)
(England) Sale Sharks	22–13 (A)	Matchday 5	(Ireland) Ulster	60–22 (H)
(England) Saracens	18–6 (H)	Matchday 6	(Wales) Scarlets	26–3 (A)
Pool 1 winner: Team / P / Pts; (France) Clermont / 6 / 22; (England) Saracens / 6 / 17; (Ireland) Munster / 6 / 15; (England) Sale Sharks / 6 / 2		Final standings	Pool 3 winner: Team / P / Pts; (France) Toulon / 6 / 22; (England) Leicester Tigers / 6 / 13; (Ireland) Ulster / 6 / 12; (Wales) Scarlets / 6 / 8	
Opponent	Result	Knock-out stage	Opponent	Result
(England) Northampton Saints	37–5 (H)	Quarter-finals	(England) Wasps	32–18 (H)
(England) Saracens	13–9 (H)	Semi-finals	(Ireland) Leinster	25–20 (H) (A.E.T.)

=== Clermont ===
In the pool stages, third-seeds Clermont topped Pool 1, winning five of six games. Their only defeat was their first game, losing 30–23 away to Saracens at Allianz Park on 18 October 2014. After that, they defeated Munster and Sale Sharks home and away, and concluded on 15 January 2015 with an 18–6 victory over Saracens at the Stade Marcel-Michelin.

On 4 April in the quarter-finals, Clermont hosted English champions Northampton Saints and won 37–5. Fourteen days later in the semi-finals they hosted Saracens, who had defeated them in the previous season's Heineken Cup semi-finals, and won 13–9. Wesley Fofana scored the only try of the match for Clermont, converted by Brock James, who also scored both of their penalties.

=== Toulon ===
Seeded second, Toulon won Pool 3 with five victories and one defeat. Their one loss came away to Leicester Tigers on 7 December, 25–21. In the quarter-finals, they triumphed 32–18 over Wasps at the Stade Mayol on 5 April, with tries by Mathieu Bastareaud and Ali Williams. Both were converted by Frédéric Michalak, who also scored all six of their penalties. Two weeks later they won their semi-final 25–20 after extra time against Leinster at the Stade Vélodrome in Marseille. The game finished 12–12 after 80 minutes, and in extra time both teams scored tries: Bryan Habana's for Toulon was converted by Leigh Halfpenny, but Séan O'Brien scored a late try for Leinster.

== Match ==
=== Details ===
2 May 2015
17:00 BST (UTC+01)

Clermont (France)	18–24	(France) Toulon
Try: Fofana 24' m Abendanon 62' c Con: Lopez (1/2) 62'; Pen: Lopez (2/2) 7', 12'	Report	Try: Bastareaud 40' c Mitchell 69' m Con: Halfpenny (1/2) 40+2'; Pen: Halfpenny (4/5) 16', 28', 32', 51'

Twickenham Stadium, London
Attendance: 56,622
Referee: Nigel Owens (Wales)

Clermont	Toulon

FB	15	(England) Nick Abendanon
RW	14	(France) Noa Nakaitaci	(substituted off) 67'
OC	13	(Wales) Jonathan Davies
IC	12	(France) Wesley Fofana
LW	11	(Fiji) Napolioni Nalaga	(substituted off) 54'
FH	10	(France) Camille Lopez
SH	9	(France) Morgan Parra	(substituted off) 56'
N8	8	(New Zealand) Fritz Lee	(substituted off) 54'
OF	7	(France) Damien Chouly (c)
BF	6	(France) Julien Bonnaire
RL	5	(France) Sebastien Vahaamahina					(substituted off) 67'
LL	4	(Canada) Jamie Cudmore	(substituted off) 10'	(substituted in) 16'	57' to 65'
TP	3	(Georgia (country)) Davit Zirakashvili	(substituted off) 66'
HK	2	(France) Benjamin Kayser	(substituted off) 63'
LP	1	(France) Vincent Debaty	(substituted off) 47'
Substitutions:
HK	16	(Australia) John Ulugia	(substituted in) 63'
PR	17	(France) Thomas Domingo	(substituted in) 47'
PR	18	(France) Clément Ric	(substituted in) 66'
LK	19	(France) Julien Pierre	(substituted in) 10'	(substituted off) 16'	(substituted in) 57'	(substituted off) 65'	(substituted in) 67'
FL	20	(Portugal) Julien Bardy	(substituted in) 54'
SH	21	(France) Ludovic Radosavljevic	(substituted in) 56'
FH	22	(New Zealand) Mike Delany	(substituted in) 67'
CE	23	(France) Aurélien Rougerie	(substituted in) 54'
Coach:
(France) Franck Azéma

FB	15	(Wales) Leigh Halfpenny
RW	14	(Australia) Drew Mitchell
OC	13	(France) Mathieu Bastareaud
IC	12	(Argentina) Juan Martín Hernández	(substituted off) 66'
LW	11	(South Africa) Bryan Habana
FH	10	(Australia) Matt Giteau
SH	9	(France) Sébastien Tillous-Borde
N8	8	(New Zealand) Chris Masoe
OF	7	(England) Steffon Armitage
BF	6	(South Africa) Juan Smith	(substituted off) 58'
RL	5	(New Zealand) Ali Williams
LL	4	(South Africa) Bakkies Botha	(substituted off) 47'
TP	3	(New Zealand) Carl Hayman (c)	(substituted off) 63'	(substituted in) 76'
HK	2	(France) Guilhem Guirado	(substituted off) 63'
LP	1	(France) Xavier Chiocci	(substituted off) 48'
Substitutions:
HK	16	(France) Jean-Charles Orioli	(substituted in) 63'
PR	17	(France) Alexandre Menini	(substituted in) 48'
PR	18	(Georgia (country)) Levan Chilachava	(substituted in) 63'	(substituted off) 76'
LK	19	(Argentina) Juan Martín Fernández Lobbe	(substituted in) 58'
FL	20	(France) Virgile Bruni
CE	21	(New Zealand) Rudi Wulf	(substituted in) 66'
SH	22	(France) Frédéric Michalak
LK	23	(France) Romain Taofifenua	(substituted in) 47'
Coach:
(France) Bernard Laporte

Man of the Match:
(New Zealand) Ali Williams (Toulon)

Touch judges:
George Clancy (Ireland)
Wayne Barnes (England)
Television match official:
Graham Hughes (England)
