= 2014–15 European Rugby Champions–Challenge Cup play-offs =

- Event: European Rugby Champions Cup Qualification Play-off
| (England) Wasps | (France) Stade Français |
| 50 | 35 |
- Aggregate Score, after 2 Legs
- Date: 18 and 24 May 2014
- Venue: Adams Park, High Wycombe; Stade Jean-Bouin, Paris

The 2014–15 European Rugby Champions Cup-Challenge Cup play-off was the first play-off for entry into the top-level competition of European Club rugby union, the European Rugby Champions Cup.

In March 2014, following the announcement of new European club competitions, the European Rugby Champions Cup and the European Rugby Challenge Cup, it was announced that the final place in the Champions Cup competition would be awarded by a play-off.

For the 2014–15 season, this was a two-legged play-off between the seventh placed teams from the 2013–14 Aviva Premiership season, and the 2013–14 Top 14 season. Following the completion of both legs, the team with the highest aggregate score took the twentieth berth in the 2014–15 European Rugby Champions Cup, the new top-tier competition, while the loser will play in the second tier 2014–15 European Rugby Challenge Cup.

== Teams ==
| League | Team | Coach | Stadium |
|---|---|---|---|
| Aviva Premiership | (England) Wasps | (Wales) Dai Young | Adams Park |
| Top 14 | (France) Stade Français | (Argentina) Gonzalo Quesada | Stade Jean-Bouin |

== Legs ==
On 29 April 2014, it was announced that the play off would take place over two legs, with each side hosting one leg. The draw to decide which team would hold home-advantage for each leg took place on 6 May 2014

=== First leg ===
18 May 2014
15:00 BST

| Wasps (England) | 30–29 | (France) Stade Français |
| Try: Varndell 26' c Johnson 44' c Simpson 59' c Con: Goode (3/3) 27', 46', 61'; Pen: Goode (3/3) 2', 15', 80' | Report | Try: Taulafo 10' c Camara 31' m Fillol 61' c Nayacalevu Vuidravuwalu 73' c Con: Dupuy (1/2) 10'; Fillol (2/2) 62', 74'; Pen: Dupuy (1/3) 55' |

Adams Park
Attendance: 5,125
Referee: John Lacey (IRFU)

| FB | 15 | (Italy) Andrea Masi |
| RW | 14 | (Tonga) William Helu |
| OC | 13 | (England) Elliot Daly |
| IC | 12 | (England) Chris Bell (c) |
| LW | 11 | (England) Tom Varndell |
| FH | 10 | (England) Andy Goode |
| SH | 9 | (England) Joe Simpson |
| N8 | 8 | (England) Nathan Hughes | | | (substituted off) 77' |
| OF | 7 | (England) James Haskell | (yellow card) 55' to 65' |
| BF | 6 | (South Africa) Ashley Johnson | | (substituted off) 65' | (substituted in) 77' |
| RL | 5 | (England) Tom Palmer | | (substituted off) 50' |
| LL | 4 | (England) Joe Launchbury |
| TP | 3 | (England) Phil Swainston | | (substituted off) 69' |
| HK | 2 | (Italy) Carlo Festuccia | | (substituted off) 65' |
| LP | 1 | (England) Matt Mullan | | (substituted off) 61' |
Replacements:
| HK | 16 | (England) Tom Lindsay | | (substituted in) 65' |
| PR | 17 | (England) Simon McIntyre | | (substituted in) 61' |
| PR | 18 | (Tonga) Taione Vea | | (substituted in) 69' |
| LK | 19 | (England) Kearnan Myall | | (substituted in) 50' |
| N8 | 20 | (England) Guy Thompson | | (substituted in) 65' |
| SH | 21 | (Australia) Brett Sheehan |
| FH | 22 | (England) Joe Carlisle |
| CE | 23 | (England) Charlie Hayter |
Coach:
(Wales) Dai Young

| FB | 15 | (France) Hugo Bonneval |
| RW | 14 | (France) Julien Arias |
| OC | 13 | (Fiji) Waisea Nayacalevu |
| IC | 12 | (South Africa) Meyer Bosman |
| LW | 11 | (France) Djibril Camara | (substituted off) 69' |
| FH | 10 | (South Africa) Morné Steyn | (substituted off) 53' | (substituted in) 72' | (substituted off) 74' |
| SH | 9 | (France) Julien Dupuy | (substituted off) 56' |
| N8 | 8 | (Australia) David Lyons |
| OF | 7 | (France) Sylvain Nicolas | (substituted off) 2' |
| BF | 6 | (France) Antoine Burban |
| RL | 5 | (France) Pascal Papé (c) |
| LL | 4 | (France) Alexandre Flanquart | (substituted off) 63' |
| TP | 3 | (France) Rabah Slimani | (substituted off) 48' | (substituted in) 77' |
| HK | 2 | (France) Laurent Sempéré | (substituted off) 53' |
| LP | 1 | (Samoa) Sakaria Taulafo | (substituted off) 48' |
Replacements:
| HK | 16 | (France) Laurent Panis | (substituted in) 53' | (substituted off) 77' |
| PR | 17 | (South Africa) Heinke van der Merwe | (substituted in) 48' |
| PR | 18 | (Georgia (country)) Davit Kubriashvili | (substituted in) 48' |
| LK | 19 | (South Africa) Anton van Zyl | (substituted in) 63' |
| FL | 20 | (United States) Scott LaValla | (substituted in) 2' |
| SH | 21 | (France) Jérôme Fillol | (substituted in) 56' |
| FH | 22 | (France) Jules Plisson | (substituted in) 53' | 72' to 74' |
| WG | 23 | (France) Jérémy Sinzelle | (substituted in) 69' |
Coach:
(Argentina) Gonzalo Quesada

Touch judges:
Dudley Phillips (IRFU)
Michael Black (IRFU)
Television match official:
Simon McDowell (IRFU)

=== Second leg ===
24 May 2014
14:45 CEST

| Stade Français (France) | 6–20 | (England) Wasps |
| Pen: Plisson (2/3) 14', 28' | Report | Try: Varndell 6' c Thompson 60' c Con: Goode (2/2) 7', 61'; Pen: Goode (2/5) 34', 75' |

Stade Jean-Bouin
Attendance: 9,000
Referee: Nigel Owens (WRU)

| FB | 15 | (France) Hugo Bonneval | | (substituted off) 73' |
| RW | 14 | (France) Julien Arias |
| OC | 13 | (Fiji) Waisea Nayacalevu |
| IC | 12 | (France) Jonathan Danty |
| LW | 11 | (Australia) Digby Ioane | | (substituted off) 29' |
| FH | 10 | (France) Jules Plisson |
| SH | 9 | (France) Jérôme Fillol | | (substituted off) 49' |
| N8 | 8 | (Italy) Sergio Parisse |
| OF | 7 | (United States) Scott LaValla | | (substituted off) 49' |
| BF | 6 | (France) Antoine Burban | (yellow card) 53' to 63' |
| RL | 5 | (France) Pascal Papé (c) |
| LL | 4 | (France) Alexandre Flanquart | (yellow card) 27' to 37' | (substituted off) 67' |
| TP | 3 | (Georgia (country)) Davit Kubriashvili | | (substituted off) 43' |
| HK | 2 | (France) Laurent Sempéré | | (substituted off) 71' | (substituted in) 77' |
| LP | 1 | (South Africa) Heinke van der Merwe | | (substituted off) 62' |
Replacements:
| HK | 16 | (South Africa) Michael van Vuuren | (yellow card) 74' to 80' | (substituted in) 71' |
| PR | 17 | (Samoa) Sakaria Taulafo | | (substituted in) 62' |
| PR | 18 | (France) Rabah Slimani | | (substituted in) 43' |
| LK | 19 | (South Africa) Anton van Zyl | | (substituted in) 67' |
| N8 | 20 | (Australia) David Lyons | | (substituted in) 49' | (substituted off) 77' |
| FH | 21 | (South Africa) Morné Steyn | | (substituted in) 73' |
| SH | 22 | (France) Julien Dupuy | | (substituted in) 49' |
| CE | 23 | (South Africa) Meyer Bosman | | (substituted in) 29' |
Coach:
(Argentina) Gonzalo Quesada

| FB | 15 | (Italy) Andrea Masi |
| RW | 14 | (Tonga) William Helu |
| OC | 13 | (England) Elliot Daly |
| IC | 12 | (England) Chris Bell (c) |
| LW | 11 | (England) Tom Varndell |
| FH | 10 | (England) Andy Goode | | (substituted off) 78' |
| SH | 9 | (England) Joe Simpson | | (substituted off) 77' |
| N8 | 8 | (England) Guy Thompson | | (substituted off) 77' |
| OF | 7 | (England) James Haskell | (yellow card) 28' to 38' |
| BF | 6 | (South Africa) Ashley Johnson | | (substituted off) 73' |
| RL | 5 | (England) Tom Palmer | | (substituted off) 70' |
| LL | 4 | (England) Joe Launchbury |
| TP | 3 | (England) Phil Swainston | | (substituted off) 78' |
| HK | 2 | (Italy) Carlo Festuccia | | (substituted off) 73' |
| LP | 1 | (England) Matt Mullan | | (substituted off) 75' |
Replacements:
| HK | 16 | (England) Tom Lindsay | | (substituted in) 73' |
| PR | 17 | (England) Simon McIntyre | | (substituted in) 75' |
| PR | 18 | (Tonga) Taione Vea | | (substituted in) 78' |
| LK | 19 | (England) Kearnan Myall | | (substituted in) 70' |
| N8 | 20 | (England) Ed Jackson | | (substituted in) 73' |
| SH | 21 | (England) Charlie Davies | | (substituted in) 77' |
| FH | 22 | (England) Joe Carlisle | | (substituted in) 78' |
| CE | 23 | (England) Charlie Hayter | | (substituted in) 77' |
Coach:
(Wales) Dai Young

Touch judges:
Ian Davies (WRU)
Sean Brickell (WRU)
Television match official:
Derek Bevan (WRU)

== Result ==
Wasps won the playoff 50 - 35 on aggregate and qualified for the 2014–15 European Rugby Champions Cup. Stade Français competed in the 2014–15 European Rugby Challenge Cup.

== See also ==
- 2014–15 European Rugby Champions Cup
- 2014–15 European Rugby Challenge Cup
