= 2014–15 European Rugby Challenge Cup =

Tournament details
- Countries: England; France; Ireland; Italy; Scotland; Wales; Romania
- Tournament format(s): Round-robin and Knockout
- Date: 16 October 2014 – 1 May 2015

Tournament statistics
- Teams: 20
- Matches played: 67
- Attendance: 391,649 (5,846 per match)
- Tries scored: 395 (5.9 per match)
- Top point scorer(s): Sam Hidalgo-Clyne (Edinburgh) (99 points)
- Top try scorer(s): Lloyd Williams (Cardiff Blues) (6 tries)

Final
- Venue: The Stoop, Twickenham
- Champions: (England) Gloucester (2nd title)
- Runners-up: (Scotland) Edinburgh

The 2014–15 European Rugby Challenge Cup was the first season of the European Rugby Challenge Cup, the annual rugby union competition. It is the 19th season of second tier pan-European club competition in general, as the competition replaces the European Challenge Cup. The competition began with the first round of the group stage, on the weekend of 16 October 2014, and ended with the final on 1 May 2015 at the Twickenham Stoop.

Gloucester became the first ever champions of the newly formatted competition, beating Edinburgh, who became the first ever Scottish team to make a European final, 19–13, with 14 men on the pitch for the final 17 minutes after centre Bill Meakes was sent off because of a dangerous high tackle off the ball on Edinburgh centre Sam Beard.

== Teams ==
Twenty teams qualified for the 2014–15 European Rugby Challenge Cup, based on their performance in their respective domestic leagues the previous season. The distribution of teams is as follows:

- England: 5 teams
  - Any teams finishing between 8th-11th position in the Aviva Premiership. (4 Teams)
  - The champion of the 2013–14 Greene King IPA Championship. (1 Team)
- France: 8 teams
  - Any teams finishing between 8th-12th position in the Top 14. (5 Teams)
  - The champion, and the winner of the promotion play-off, from the Pro D2. (2 Teams)
  - There will be an 8th team from France, as Stade Français lost the 7th-place play-off for entry into the European Rugby Champions Cup. (1 team)
- Ireland, Italy, Scotland & Wales: 5 teams
  - Any teams that did not qualify for the European Rugby Champions Cup through the 2013–14 RaboDirect Pro12
- Other European Nations: 2 teams
  - Two teams will qualify through the Qualifying Competition, which will take place in September.

So far, the following 18 teams have qualified.

| English Premiership | Top 14 | Pro12 | | | | Qualifying Competition |
| England | France | Ireland | Italy | Scotland | Wales | Other |
|---|---|---|---|---|---|---|
| Exeter Chiefs; Gloucester; London Irish; Newcastle Falcons; London Welsh (Championship) | Stade Français (7th-place play-off); Bordeaux Bègles; Brive; Bayonne; Grenoble; Oyonnax; Lyon (Pro D2); La Rochelle (Pro D2) | Connacht | Zebre | Edinburgh | Cardiff Blues; Newport Gwent Dragons | (Italy) Rovigo Delta; (Romania) București Wolves |

=== Champions Cup play-off ===
The following teams took part in the play-off to decide the final team in the Champions Cup. The play-off was held between the seventh-placed teams in the English Premiership and the Top 14. The loser of this play-off entered the Challenge Cup.

| English Premiership | Top 14 |
| England | France |
|---|---|
| Wasps | Stade Français |

On 29 April 2014, it was announced that this play-off would take place over two legs, on the weekends of 17/18 May and 24/25 May, with a draw being used to determine home advantage for each leg.

The draw took place in Heathrow on 6 May 2014. Following the draw, the fixtures were announced as follows:

18 May 2014
15:00 BST

| Wasps (England) | 30–29 | (France) Stade Français |

Adams Park, High Wycombe
Referee: John Lacey (Ireland)

24 May 2014
14:45 CEST

| Stade Français (France) | 6–20 | (England) Wasps |

Stade Jean-Bouin, Paris
Referee: Nigel Owens (Wales)

Stade Français lost the play-off 35–50 on aggregate, and will play in the Challenge Cup.

=== Qualifying Competition ===
On 14 August 2014, EPCR announced the format for the first Qualifying Competition.

Given the amount of time until the start of the Challenge Cup, it was announced that this first competition will consist of two ties, played over two legs, with the aggregate winner of each taking a place in either pool. The first legs took place on 20 September, with the return legs taking place on 27 September

==== Rugby Europe 1 play-off ====
20 September 2014
16:00 CEST

| Rovigo Delta (Italy) | 22–18 | (Georgia (country)) Tbilisi Caucasians |

Stadio Mario Battaglini
Referee: Lloyd Lynton (Scotland)

27 September 2014
17:00 GET

| Tbilisi Caucasians (Georgia (country)) | 21–24 | (Italy) Rovigo Delta |

Stadium Avchala
Referee: Matthew Carley (England)

- Rovigo Delta won the play-off 46–39 on aggregate, and qualify for Pool 1.

==== Rugby Europe 2 play-off ====
20 September 2014
21:00 EEST

| București Wolves (Romania) | 18–13 | (Italy) Calvisano |

Stadium Arcul de Triumf
Referee: Gary Conway (Ireland)

27 September 2014
19:30 CEST

| Calvisano (Italy) | 13–10 | (Romania) București Wolves |

Peroni Stadium
Referee: Alexandre Ruiz (France)

- București Wolves won the play-off 28–26 on aggregate, and qualify for Pool 3

=== Team details ===
Below is the list of coaches, captain and stadiums with their method of qualification for each team.

Note: Placing shown in brackets, denotes standing at the end of the regular season for their respective leagues, with their end of season positioning shown through CH for champions, RU for runner-up, SF for losing semi-finalist and QF for losing quarter-finalist.

| Team | Coach / Director of Rugby | Captain | Stadium | Capacity | Method of Qualification |
|---|---|---|---|---|---|
| (France) Bayonne | (Argentina) Patricio Noriega (France) Nicolas Morlaes | (France) David Roumieu | Stade Jean Dauger | 17,000 | Top 14 7th-12th (10th) |
| (France) Bordeaux Bègles | (France) Raphaël Ibañez | (New Zealand) Matthew Clarkin | Stade André Moga | 10,000 | Top 14 7th-12th (8th) |
| (France) Brive | (France) Nicolas Godignon | (France) Arnaud Méla | Stade Amédée-Domenech | 16,000 | Top 14 7th-12th (9th) |
| (Romania) București Wolves | (Wales) Lynn Howells | (Romania) Stelian Burcea | Arcul de Triumf Stadium | 5,500 | Challenge Cup Qualification play-off |
| (Wales) Cardiff Blues | (Wales) Paul John (Wales) Dale McIntosh (For (New Zealand) Mark Hammett) (Note: Mark Hammett began the tournament as Cardiff Blues head coach, but resigned for personal reasons on 25 February 2015, and replaced by Hammett's assistants, Paul John and Dale McIntosh who will oversee the Blues from the quarter-finals onwards.) | (Wales) Matthew Rees | Cardiff Arms Park | 12,500 | Pro12 bottom 5 (7th) |
| (Ireland) Connacht | (Samoa) Pat Lam | (Ireland) John Muldoon | Galway Sportsgrounds | 7,800 | Pro12 bottom 5 (10th) |
| (Scotland) Edinburgh | (South Africa) Alan Solomons | (New Zealand) Mike Coman | Murrayfield Stadium | 12,464 (Note: Although Murrayfield's full capacity is 67,800, only the lower section of the West Stand, with a capacity of 12,464, is generally opened for Edinburgh fixtures.) | Pro12 bottom 5 (8th) |
| (England) Exeter Chiefs | (England) Rob Baxter | (Australia) Dean Mumm | Sandy Park | 10,744 | Aviva Premiership 7th-11th (8th) |
| (England) Gloucester | (Ireland) David Humphreys | (England) Billy Twelvetrees | Kingsholm Stadium | 16,500 | Aviva Premiership 7th-11th (9th) |
| (France) Grenoble | (France) Fabrice Landreau | (France) Fabien Gengenbacher | Stade des Alpes | 20,000 | Top 14 7th-12th (11th) |
| (France) La Rochelle | (France) Patrice Collazo (France) Fabrice Ribeyrolles | (France) Uini Atonio | Stade Marcel-Deflandre | 12,500 | 2013–14 Rugby Pro D2 promotion play-off winner |
| (England) London Irish | (Australia) Brian Smith | (England) George Skivington | Madejski Stadium | 24,250 | Aviva Premiership 7th-11th (10th) |
| (England) London Welsh | (Wales) Justin Burnell | (England) Tom May | Kassam Stadium | 12,500 | 2013–14 RFU Championship Champion |
| (France) Lyon | (Australia) Tim Lane | (France) Lionel Nallet | Matmut Stadium | 8,000 | 2013–14 Rugby Pro D2 Champion |
| (England) Newcastle Falcons | (England) Dean Richards | (England) Will Welch | Kingston Park | 10,200 | Aviva Premiership 7th-11th (11th) |
| (Wales) Newport Gwent Dragons | (Wales) Lyn Jones | (Wales) Lee Byrne | Rodney Parade | 11,676 | Pro12 bottom 5 (9th) |
| (France) Oyonnax | (France) Christophe Urios | (France) Florian Denos | Stade Charles-Mathon | 11,400 | Top 14 7th-12th (12th) |
| (Italy) Rovigo Delta | (Italy) Filippo Frati | (New Zealand) Luke Mahoney | Stadio Comunale Mario Battaglini | 6,000 | Challenge Cup Qualification play-off |
| (France) Stade Français | (Argentina) Gonzalo Quesada | (Italy) Sergio Parisse | Stade Jean-Bouin | 20,000 | 7th-place play-off loser |
| (Italy) Zebre | (Italy) Andrea Cavinato | (Italy) Marco Bortolami | Stadio XXV Aprile renamed Stadio Sergio Lanfranchi in January 2015 | 5,000 | Pro12 bottom 5 (12th) |

== Seeding ==
The 20 competing teams will be seeded and split into four tiers, seeding will be based on performance in their respective domestic leagues. Where promotion and relegation is in effect in a league, the promoted team will be seeded last, or (if multiple teams are promoted) by performance in the lower tier. So, Lyon – who were Pro D2 champions – will be the seventh Top 14 seed while La Rochelle – who qualified through the Pro D2 play-off – will be the eighth seed.

As with the previous European competition, the European Challenge Cup, teams from the same country will be kept apart where possible. However, as 8 teams have qualified from France, 3 pools will contain two French teams – Oyonnax, Lyon and La Rochelle.

For the purposes of creating the tiers, the clubs are ranked based on their finishing positions in the Top 14, Aviva Premiership, Pro12 and PRO D2 Leagues, or on their qualification via a play-off.

| Rank | Top 14 | Premiership | Pro 12 | Qualifying Competition |
|---|---|---|---|---|
| 1 | (France) Stade Français | (England) Exeter Chiefs | (Wales) Cardiff Blues | (Italy) Rovigo Delta |
| 2 | (France) Bordeaux Bègles | (England) Gloucester | (Scotland) Edinburgh | (Romania) București Wolves |
| 3 | (France) Brive | (England) London Irish | (Wales) Newport Gwent Dragons | |
| 4 | (France) Bayonne | (England) Newcastle Falcons | (Ireland) Connacht | |
| 5 | (France) Grenoble | (England) London Welsh | (Italy) Zebre | |
| 6 | (France) Oyonnax | | | |
| 7 | (France) Lyon | | | |
| 8 | (France) La Rochelle | | | |

Teams will be taken from a league in order of rank and put into a tier. A draw is used allocate two second seeds to Tier 1, the remaining team will go into Tier 2. This allocation then determines which fourth seeded team enters Tier 2, while the others enter Tier 3.

Given the nature of the Qualifying Competition, a competition including developing rugby nations and Italian clubs not competing in the Pro12, Rugby Europe 1 and Rugby Europe 2 are automatically included in Tier 4, despite officially being ranked 1/2 from that competition.

The brackets show each teams seeding and their league (for example, 1 Top 14 indicates the team has been seeded 1st from the Top 14).

| Tier 1 | (Wales) Cardiff Blues (1 Pro12) | (England) Exeter Chiefs (1 AP) | (France) Stade Français (1 Top 14) | (England) Gloucester (2 AP) | (Scotland) Edinburgh (2 Pro12) |
| Tier 2 | (France) Bordeaux Bègles (2 Top 14) | (France) Brive (3 Top 14) | (England) London Irish (3 AP) | (Wales) Newport Gwent Dragons (3 Pro12) | (France) Bayonne (4 Top 14) |
| Tier 3 | (England) Newcastle Falcons (4 AP) | (Ireland) Connacht (4 Pro12) | (France) FC Grenoble (5 Top 14) | (England) London Welsh (5 AP) | (Italy) Zebre (5 Pro12) |
| Tier 4 | (France) Oyonnax (6 Top 14) | (France) Lyon (7 Top 14) | (France) La Rochelle (8 Top 14) | (Italy) Rovigo Delta (Rugby Europe 1) | (Romania) București Wolves (Rugby Europe 2) |

== Pool stage ==
The draw took place on 10 June 2014, at the Stade de la Maladière in Neuchâtel.

Teams will play each other twice, both at home and away, in the group stage, that will begin on the weekend of 16/17/18/19 October 2014, and continue through to 22/23/24/25 January 2015, before the pool winners and three best runners-up progress to the quarter-finals.

Fixtures were announced on Thursday 14 August 2014 at 2 pm.

Teams are awarded competition points, based on match result. Teams receive 4 points for a win, 2 points for a draw, 1 attacking bonus point for scoring four or more tries in a match and 1 defensive bonus point for losing a match by seven points or fewer.

In the event of a tie between two or more teams, the following tie-breakers are used, as directed by EPCR:

1. Where teams have played each other
  1. The club with the greater number of competition points from only matches involving tied teams.
  2. If equal, the club that scored the most tries in those matches.
  3. If equal, the club with the best aggregate points difference from those matches.
2. Where teams remain tied and/or have not played each other in the competition (i.e. are from different pools)
  1. If equal, the club with the best aggregate points difference from the pool stage.
  2. The club that scored the most tries in the pool stage.
  3. If equal, the club with the fewest players suspended in the pool stage.
  4. If equal, the drawing of lots will determine a club's ranking.

Key to colours
| Winner of each pool, advance to quarter-finals. |
| Three highest-scoring second-place teams advance to quarter-finals. |

=== Pool 1 ===
| Pos | Team | Pld | W | D | L | PF | PA | PD | TF | TA | TB | LB | Pts |
|---|---|---|---|---|---|---|---|---|---|---|---|---|---|
| 1 | (England) London Irish (4) | 6 | 5 | 0 | 1 | 220 | 123 | +97 | 30 | 11 | 4 | 0 | 24 |
| 2 | (Wales) Cardiff Blues (6) | 6 | 5 | 0 | 1 | 249 | 95 | +154 | 35 | 10 | 4 | 0 | 24 |
| 3 | (France) Grenoble | 6 | 2 | 0 | 4 | 161 | 160 | +1 | 19 | 21 | 3 | 1 | 12 |
| 4 | (Italy) Rovigo Delta | 6 | 0 | 0 | 6 | 77 | 329 | −252 | 8 | 50 | 0 | 1 | 1 |

Source: espn.co.uk

=== Pool 2 ===
| Pos | Team | Pld | W | D | L | PF | PA | PD | TF | TA | TB | LB | Pts |
|---|---|---|---|---|---|---|---|---|---|---|---|---|---|
| 1 | (England) Exeter Chiefs (2) | 6 | 5 | 0 | 1 | 212 | 97 | +115 | 26 | 11 | 4 | 1 | 25 |
| 2 | (Ireland) Connacht (8) | 6 | 4 | 0 | 2 | 186 | 144 | +42 | 23 | 16 | 4 | 0 | 20 |
| 3 | (France) Bayonne | 6 | 2 | 0 | 4 | 106 | 165 | −59 | 10 | 18 | 0 | 1 | 9 |
| 4 | (France) La Rochelle | 6 | 1 | 0 | 5 | 84 | 182 | −98 | 10 | 24 | 0 | 0 | 4 |

Source: espn.co.uk

=== Pool 3 ===
| Pos | Team | Pld | W | D | L | PF | PA | PD | TF | TA | TB | LB | Pts |
|---|---|---|---|---|---|---|---|---|---|---|---|---|---|
| 1 | (Wales) Newport Gwent Dragons (3) | 6 | 5 | 0 | 1 | 240 | 127 | +113 | 31 | 15 | 4 | 1 | 25 |
| 2 | (England) Newcastle Falcons (7) | 6 | 4 | 0 | 2 | 208 | 149 | +59 | 29 | 20 | 4 | 1 | 21 |
| 3 | (France) Stade Français | 6 | 3 | 0 | 3 | 155 | 143 | +12 | 19 | 13 | 2 | 1 | 15 |
| 4 | (Romania) București Wolves | 6 | 0 | 0 | 6 | 77 | 261 | −184 | 8 | 39 | 0 | 1 | 1 |

Source: espn.co.uk

=== Pool 4 ===
| Pos | Team | Pld | W | D | L | PF | PA | PD | TF | TA | TB | LB | Pts |
|---|---|---|---|---|---|---|---|---|---|---|---|---|---|
| 1 | (Scotland) Edinburgh (5) | 6 | 5 | 0 | 1 | 146 | 90 | +56 | 14 | 8 | 1 | 1 | 22 |
| 2 | (France) Lyon | 6 | 4 | 0 | 2 | 149 | 139 | +10 | 17 | 15 | 2 | 0 | 18 |
| 3 | (France) Bordeaux Bègles | 6 | 3 | 0 | 3 | 176 | 142 | +34 | 22 | 14 | 3 | 1 | 16 |
| 4 | (England) London Welsh | 6 | 0 | 0 | 6 | 72 | 172 | −100 | 7 | 23 | 0 | 1 | 1 |

Source: espn.co.uk

=== Pool 5 ===
| Pos | Team | Pld | W | D | L | PF | PA | PD | TF | TA | TB | LB | Pts |
|---|---|---|---|---|---|---|---|---|---|---|---|---|---|
| 1 | (England) Gloucester (1) | 6 | 6 | 0 | 0 | 211 | 64 | +147 | 25 | 6 | 5 | 0 | 29 |
| 2 | (France) Oyonnax | 6 | 4 | 0 | 2 | 123 | 124 | −1 | 12 | 13 | 0 | 0 | 16 |
| 3 | (Italy) Zebre | 6 | 2 | 0 | 4 | 102 | 154 | −52 | 10 | 18 | 0 | 0 | 8 |
| 4 | (France) Brive | 6 | 0 | 0 | 6 | 93 | 187 | −94 | 11 | 21 | 0 | 2 | 2 |

Source: espn.co.uk

=== Seeding and runners-up ===
| Seed | Pool Winners | Pts | TF | +/− |
|---|---|---|---|---|
| 1 | (England) Gloucester | 29 | 25 | +147 |
| 2 | (England) Exeter Chiefs | 25 | 26 | +115 |
| 3 | (Wales) Newport Gwent Dragons | 25 | 31 | +113 |
| 4 | (England) London Irish | 24 | 30 | +97 |
| 5 | (Scotland) Edinburgh | 22 | 14 | +56 |
| Seed | Pool Runners–up | Pts | TF | +/− |
| 6 | (Wales) Cardiff Blues | 24 | 35 | +154 |
| 7 | (England) Newcastle Falcons | 21 | 29 | +59 |
| 8 | (Ireland) Connacht | 20 | 23 | +42 |
| 9 | (France) Lyon | 18 | 17 | +10 |
| 10 | (France) Oyonnax | 16 | 12 | -1 |

== Knock-out stage ==
The eight qualifiers will be seeded according to performance in the pool stage, and compete in the quarter-finals, which will be held on the 3/4/5 April 2015. The four top seeds will host the quarter-finals against the lower seeds, in a 1v8, 2v7, 3v6 and 4v5 format.

The semi-finals, to be contested by the quarter-final winners, will take place on the weekend of 17/18/19 April 2015.

The winners of the semi-finals will contest the final, at The Twickenham Stoop, on the weekend of 1 May 2015.

=== Bracket ===
Quarter-finals
4 | (England) London Irish | 18
5 | (Scotland) Edinburgh | 23
3 | (Wales) Newport Gwent Dragons | 25
6 | (Wales) Cardiff Blues | 21
1 | (England) Gloucester | 14
8 | (Ireland) Connacht | 7
2 | (England) Exeter Chiefs | 48
7 | (England) Newcastle Falcons | 13

Semi-finals
4 | (Scotland) Edinburgh | 45
3 | (Wales) Newport Gwent Dragons | 16
1 | (England) Gloucester | 30
2 | (England) Exeter Chiefs | 19

Final
4 | (Scotland) Edinburgh | 13
1 | (England) Gloucester | 19

=== Quarter-finals ===
3 April 2015
19:45

| Gloucester (England) | 14–7 | (Ireland) Connacht |
| Try: Sharples 20' c Meakes 30' c Con: Laidlaw (2/2) 21', 31' | Report | Try: Penalty try 65' c Con: Carty (1/1) 66' |

Kingsholm Stadium, Gloucester
Attendance: 13,236
Referee: Mathieu Raynal (France)

4 April 2015
12:45

| Newport Gwent Dragons (Wales) | 25–21 | (Wales) Cardiff Blues |
| Try: Amos 35' c Cudd 45' m Penalty try 50' c Con: Prydie (2/3) 35', 51'; Pen: Prydie (1/3) 8'; D. Jones (1/1) 67' | Report | Try: L. Williams 4' c Anscombe 25' c Navidi 74' c Con: Anscombe (3/3) 5', 26', 74' |

Rodney Parade, Newport
Attendance: 8,119
Referee: JP Doyle (England)

4 April 2015
20:00

| Exeter Chiefs (England) | 48–13 | (England) Newcastle Falcons |
| Try: Ewers 12' c Penalty try 19' c Waldrom 41' c McGuigan 58' c Hill 69' c Mumm 71' c Con: Slade (4/4) 13', 20', 41', 58'; Steenson (2/2) 70', 73'; Pen: Slade (2/2) 35', 54' | Report | Try: Harris 66' c Con: Catterick (1/1) 68'; Pen: Catterick (2/2) 33', 39' |

Sandy Park, Exeter
Attendance: 10,022
Referee: Marius Mitrea (Italy)

5 April 2015
17:45

| London Irish (England) | 18–23 | (Scotland) Edinburgh |
| Try: Gilsenan 40' c Steele 52' m Con: Geraghty (1/2) 40'; Pen: Geraghty (2/4) 32', 45' | Report | Try: Nel 10' c McKenzie 59' c Con: Hidalgo-Clyne (2/2) 11', 61'; Pen: Hidalgo-Clyne (3/3) 1', 18', 20' |

Madejski Stadium, Reading
Attendance: 4,728
Referee: Pascal Gaüzère (France)

=== Semi-finals ===
17 April 2015
19:45

| Edinburgh (Scotland) | 45–16 | (Wales) Newport Gwent Dragons |
| Try: McInally 14' c Visser 22' m B. Toolis 54' c Hidalgo-Clyne 60' c Fife 67' c Con: Hidalgo-Clyne (4/5) 16', 56', 61', 69'; Pen: Hidalgo-Clyne (4/5) 10', 33', 40+2', 58' | Report | Try: Harris 43' c Con: D. Jones (1/1) 44'; Pen: D. Jones (3/3) 3', 18', 30' |

Murrayfield Stadium, Edinburgh
Attendance: 8,231
Referee: JP Doyle (England)

18 April 2015
19:45

| Gloucester (England) | 30–19 | (England) Exeter Chiefs |
| Try: Meakes 30' c Savage 67' c May 77' c Con: Laidlaw (3/3) 31', 68', 78'; Pen: Laidlaw (2/3) 17', 71'; Hook (1/1) 38' | Report | Try: Taione 75' c Con: Steenson (1/1) 76'; Pen: Slade (4/4) 20', 40', 45', 60' |

Kingsholm Stadium
Attendance: 11,907
Referee: John Lacey (Ireland)

=== Final ===
1 May 2015
19:45 BST

| Edinburgh (Scotland) | 13–19 | (England) Gloucester |
| Try: Ford 65' c Con: Hidalgo-Clyne (1/1) 65'; Pen: Hidalgo-Clyne (2/3) 2', 35' | Report | Try: Twelvetrees 10' c Con: Laidlaw (1/1) 11'; Pen: Laidlaw (4/5) 8', 36', 49', 53' |

Twickenham Stoop, London
Attendance: 14,316
Referee: Jérôme Garcès (France)

== See also ==
- 2014–15 European Rugby Champions Cup
