= 2014–15 European Rugby Champions Cup =

International sports competition

Tournament details
- Countries: England; France; Ireland; Italy; Scotland; Wales
- Tournament format(s): Round-robin and Knockout
- Date: 17 October 2014 – 2 May 2015

Tournament statistics
- Teams: 20
- Matches played: 67
- Attendance: 985,717 (14,712 per match)
- Tries scored: 287 (4.28 per match)
- Top point scorer(s): Ian Madigan (Leinster) (113 points)
- Top try scorer(s): George North (Northampton Saints) (7 tries)

Final
- Venue: Twickenham Stadium, London
- Champions: (France) Toulon (3rd title)
- Runners-up: (France) Clermont

The 2014–15 European Rugby Champions Cup was the first season of the European Rugby Champions Cup (20th overall), the annual rugby union club competition for teams from the top six nations in European rugby, and the 20th season of professional European rugby union in total. It replaced the Heineken Cup as Europe's top-tier competition for rugby clubs. The competition got underway on the weekend of 17 October 2014 with the first round of the pool stage, and ended with the final on 2 May 2015 at Twickenham Stadium, London, England.

Toulon were the champions having beaten Clermont 24–18 in a repeat of the 2013 Heineken Cup Final. Toulon retained their title for the second consecutive year, the first team to win three European titles in a row.

== Teams ==
20 clubs, from the three major European domestic leagues, will compete in the Champions Cup:

- England: 7 clubs
  - The top 6 clubs in the Aviva Premiership. (6 clubs)
  - There was a seventh club from England, after Wasps won the 7th Place play-off for entry into the European Rugby Champions Cup. (1 club)
- France: 6 clubs, based on performance in the Top 14.
- Ireland, Italy, Scotland & Wales: 7 clubs, based on performance in the Pro12.
  - The best placed club from each nation (4 clubs)
  - The 3 highest ranked clubs not qualified thereafter (3 clubs)

The following clubs qualified for the competition:

Aviva Premiership	Top 14	Pro 12			
England	France	Ireland	Italy	Scotland	Wales
Saracens; Northampton Saints; Leicester Tigers; Harlequins; Bath; Sale Sharks; Wasps (7th Place play-off)	Toulon; Montpellier; Clermont; Racing Métro; Toulouse; Castres Olympique	Leinster; Munster; Ulster	Benetton Treviso	Glasgow Warriors	Ospreys; Scarlets

=== 20th Team play-off ===
The following teams took part in the play-off for the final place in the Champions Cup, having finished 7th in their respective leagues.

Aviva Premiership	Top 14
England	France
Wasps	Stade Français

This play-off took place over two legs, on the weekends of 17/18 May and 24/25 May, with a draw being used to determine home advantage for each leg. The draw took place on 6 May 2014, in Heathrow. Following the draw, the fixtures were announced as follows:

18 May 2014
15:00 BST

Wasps (England)	30–29	(France) Stade Français

Adams Park
Referee: John Lacey (IRFU)

24 May 2014
14:45 CEST

Stade Français (France)	6–20	(England) Wasps

Stade Jean-Bouin
Referee: Nigel Owens (WRU)

Wasps won the play-off 50–35 on aggregate and qualified for the Champions Cup.

=== Team details ===
Below is the list of coaches, captain and stadiums with their method of qualification for each team.

Note: Placing shown in brackets, denotes standing at the end of the regular season for their respective leagues, with their end of season positioning shown through CH for Champions, RU for Runner-up, SF for losing Semi-finalist and QF for losing Quarter-finalist.

Team	Coach / Director of Rugby	Captain	Stadium	Capacity	Method of Qualification
(England) Bath	(England) Mike Ford	(England) Stuart Hooper	Recreation Ground	14,000	Aviva Premiership top 6 (5th)
(Italy) Benetton Treviso	(Italy) Umberto Casellato	(Italy) Antonio Pavanello	Stadio Comunale di Monigo	6,700	Top Pro12 Italian team (11th)
(France) Castres Olympique	(France) Serge Milhas	(France) Rémi Talès	Stade Pierre-Antoine	11,500	Top 14 top 6 (6th) (RU)
(France) Clermont	(France) Franck Azéma	(France) Damien Chouly	Stade Marcel-Michelin	18,000	Top 14 top 6 (3rd) (QF)
(Scotland) Glasgow Warriors	(Scotland) Gregor Townsend	(Scotland) Alastair Kellock	Scotstoun Stadium	9,708	Top Pro12 Scottish team (2nd) (RU)
(England) Harlequins	(Ireland) Conor O'Shea	(England) Joe Marler	The Stoop	14,816	Aviva Premiership top 6 (4th) (SF)
(England) Leicester Tigers	(England) Richard Cockerill	(England) Ed Slater	Welford Road	24,000	Aviva Premiership top 6 (3rd) (SF)
(Ireland) Leinster	(Australia) Matt O'Connor	(Ireland) Jamie Heaslip	RDS Arena; Aviva Stadium	18,500; 51,700	Top Pro12 Irish team (1st) (CH)
(France) Montpellier	(South Africa) Jake White (For (France) Fabien Galthié) (Note: Fabien Galthié began the tournament as Montpellier head coach, but was removed from his post on 30 December 2014, and replaced by Jake White.)	(France) Fulgence Ouedraogo	Altrad Stadium	14,700	Top 14 top 6 (2nd) (SF)
(Ireland) Munster	(Ireland) Anthony Foley	(Ireland) Peter O'Mahony	Thomond Park	25,600	Pro12 top 7 (3rd) (SF)
(England) Northampton Saints	(England) Jim Mallinder	(England) Dylan Hartley	Franklin's Gardens	13,600	Aviva Premiership top 6 (2nd) (CH)
(Wales) Ospreys	(Wales) Steve Tandy	(Wales) Alun Wyn Jones	Liberty Stadium	20,532	Top Pro12 Welsh Team (5th)
(France) Racing Métro	(France) Laurent Labit	(France) Dimitri Szarzewski	Stade Yves-du-Manoir	14,000	Top 14 top 6 (5th) (SF)
(England) Sale Sharks	(Scotland) Bryan Redpath	(New Zealand) Daniel Braid	AJ Bell Stadium	12,000	Aviva Premiership top 6 (6th)
(England) Saracens	(Ireland) Mark McCall	(South Africa) Alistair Hargreaves	Allianz Park	10,000	Aviva Premiership top 6 (1st) (RU)
(Wales) Scarlets	(New Zealand) Wayne Pivac	(Wales) Ken Owens	Parc y Scarlets	14,870	Pro12 top 7 (6th)
(France) Toulon	(France) Bernard Laporte	(New Zealand) Carl Hayman	Stade Mayol	15,400	Top 14 top 6 (1st) (CH)
(France) Toulouse	(France) Guy Novès	(France) Thierry Dusautoir	Stade Ernest-Wallon	19,500	Top 14 top 6 (4th) (SF)
(Ireland) Ulster	(Ireland) Neil Doak	(Ireland) Rory Best	Kingspan Stadium	18,196	Pro12 top 7 (4th) (SF)
(England) Wasps	(Wales) Dai Young	(England) James Haskell	Adams Park; Ricoh Arena (Note: Wasps moved their home ground to Ricoh Arena in Coventry, and played their first match there on 21 December.)	10,516; 32,609	7th Place play-off winner

== Seeding ==
The 20 competing teams were seeded and split into four tiers; seeding was based on performance in their respective domestic leagues.

For the purpose of creating the tiers, Aviva Premiership clubs were ranked only according to their finishing positions in the League table, and not based on performance in the knockout phase of the season, while Top 14 and Pro12 clubs were ranked based on their League performances and on their qualification for the knockout phases of their championships, so a losing quarter-finalist in the Top 14 would be seeded below a losing semi-finalist, even if they finished above them in the regular season.

Rank	Top 14	Premiership	Pro 12
1	(France) Toulon	(England) Saracens	(Ireland) Leinster Rugby
2	(France) Castres Olympique	(England) Northampton Saints	(Scotland) Glasgow Warriors
3	(France) Montpellier	(England) Leicester Tigers	(Ireland) Munster
4	(France) Racing Métro	(England) Harlequins	(Ireland) Ulster
5	(France) Clermont	(England) Bath	(Wales) Ospreys
6	(France) Toulouse	(England) Sale Sharks	(Wales) Scarlets
7		(England) Wasps	(Italy) Benetton Treviso

Teams were taken from a league and put into a tier; a draw was used to allocate two second seeds to Tier 1, the remaining team went into Tier 2. This allocation then determined which fourth seeded team entered Tier 2, while the others entered Tier 3.

As with the previous European competition, the Heineken Cup, teams from the same country were kept apart where possible. However, as 7 teams qualified from England, 2 pools would by necessity contain two English teams and as 6 French teams qualified, there would be one pool with two French teams. Sale Sharks and Wasps would be drawn into pools which contained one other Aviva Premiership club, and Toulouse would be drawn into a pool which contained one other Top 14 club.

The brackets show each team's seeding and their league (for example, 1 Top 14 indicates the team was seeded 1st from the Top 14).

Tier 1	(Ireland) Leinster (1 Pro12)	(England) Saracens (1 AP)	(France) Toulon (1 Top 14)	(England) Northampton Saints (2 AP)	(Scotland) Glasgow Warriors (2 Pro12)
Tier 2	(France) Castres Olympique (2 Top 14)	(Ireland) Munster (3 Pro12)	(England) Leicester Tigers (3 AP)	(France) Montpellier (3 Top 14)	(France) Racing Métro (4 Top14)
Tier 3	(England) Harlequins (4 AP)	(Ireland) Ulster (4 Pro12)	(Wales) Ospreys (5 Pro12)	(England) Bath (5 AP)	(France) Clermont (5 Top 14)
Tier 4	(Wales) Scarlets (6 Pro12)	(England) Sale Sharks (6 AP)	(France) Toulouse (6 Top 14)	(England) Wasps (Play-off)	(Italy) Benetton Treviso (7 Pro12)

== Pool stage ==
The draw took place on 10 June 2014, at the Stade de la Maladière in Neuchâtel.

Fixtures were announced on Thursday 14 August 2014 at 2 pm.

Teams played each other twice, both at home and away, in the group stage, that began on the weekend of 17/18/19 October 2014, and continued through to 23/24/25 January 2015, before the pool winners and three best runners-up progressed to the quarter-finals.

Teams were awarded competition points, based on match result. Teams receive 4 points for a win, 2 points for a draw, 1 attacking bonus point for scoring four or more tries in a match and 1 defensive bonus point for losing a match by seven points or fewer.

In the event of a tie between two or more teams, the following tie-breakers were used, as directed by EPCR:

1. Where teams have played each other
  1. The club with the greater number of competition points from only matches involving tied teams.
  2. If equal, the club that scored the most tries in those matches.
  3. If equal, the club with the best aggregate points difference from those matches.
2. Where teams remain tied and/or have not played each other in the competition (i.e. are from different pools)
  1. The club with the best aggregate points difference from the pool stage.
  2. If equal, the club that scored the most tries in the pool stage.
  3. If equal, the club with the fewest players suspended in the pool stage.
  4. If equal, the drawing of lots will determine a club's ranking.

Key to colours
Winner of each pool, advance to quarter-finals.
Three highest-ranked second-place teams advance to quarter-finals.

=== Pool 1 ===
Team	P	W	D	L	PF	PA	Diff	TF	TA	TB	LB	Pts
(France) Clermont (3)	6	5	0	1	140	80	+60	14	6	1	1	22
(England) Saracens (8)	6	4	0	2	119	95	+24	12	10	1	0	17
(Ireland) Munster	6	3	0	3	144	114	+30	15	11	1	2	15
(England) Sale Sharks	6	0	0	6	82	196	−114	8	22	0	2	2

=== Pool 2 ===
Team	P	W	D	L	PF	PA	Diff	TF	TA	TB	LB	Pts
(Ireland) Leinster (4)	6	4	1	1	148	101	+47	13	9	1	1	20
(England) Wasps (7)	6	3	1	2	155	105	+50	18	12	2	2	18
(England) Harlequins	6	4	0	2	135	99	+36	13	7	1	1	18
(France) Castres Olympique	6	0	0	6	86	219	−133	10	26	0	1	1

=== Pool 3 ===
Team	P	W	D	L	PF	PA	Diff	TF	TA	TB	LB	Pts
(France) Toulon (2)	6	5	0	1	181	89	+92	19	9	1	1	22
(England) Leicester Tigers	6	3	0	3	108	126	−18	12	15	1	0	13
(Ireland) Ulster	6	2	0	4	116	146	−30	16	15	3	1	12
(Wales) Scarlets	6	2	0	4	90	134	−44	8	16	0	0	8

=== Pool 4 ===
Team	P	W	D	L	PF	PA	Diff	TF	TA	TB	LB	Pts
(England) Bath (5)	6	4	0	2	146	108	+38	15	15	2	1	19
(France) Toulouse	6	4	0	2	126	124	+2	11	10	0	1	17
(Scotland) Glasgow Warriors	6	3	0	3	108	84	+24	11	6	1	2	15
(France) Montpellier	6	1	0	5	90	154	−64	9	15	0	2	6

=== Pool 5 ===
Team	P	W	D	L	PF	PA	Diff	TF	TA	TB	LB	Pts
(France) Racing Métro (1)	6	5	1	0	168	69	+99	20	7	2	0	24
(England) Northampton Saints (6)	6	4	0	2	178	82	+96	25	8	3	0	19
(Wales) Ospreys	6	1	1	4	110	121	−11	11	13	1	2	9
(Italy) Benetton Treviso	6	1	0	5	62	246	−184	8	36	0	0	4

=== Seeding and runners-up ===
Seed	Pool Winners	Pts	TF	+/−
1	(France) Racing Métro	24	20	+99
2	(France) Toulon	22	19	+92
3	(France) Clermont	22	14	+60
4	(Ireland) Leinster	20	13	+47
5	(England) Bath	19	15	+38
Seed	Pool Runners–up	Pts	TF	+/−
6	(England) Northampton Saints	19	25	+96
7	(England) Wasps	18	18	+50
8	(England) Saracens	17	12	+24
9	(France) Toulouse	17	11	+2
10	(England) Leicester	13	15	-18

== Knock-out stage ==
The eight qualifiers were seeded according to performance in the pool stage, and competed in the quarter-finals, which were held on the weekend of 3–5 April 2015. The four top seeds hosted the quarter-finals against the lower seeds, in a 1v8, 2v7, 3v6 and 4v5 format.

The semi-finals were played on the weekend of 18–19 April 2015.

The winners of the semi-finals will contest the final, at Twickenham Stadium, on 2 May 2015.

=== Bracket ===
Quarter-finals
3	(France) Clermont	37
6	(England) Northampton Saints	5
1	(France) Racing Métro	11
8	(England) Saracens	12
2	(France) Toulon	32
7	(England) Wasps	18
4	(Ireland) Leinster	18
5	(England) Bath	15

Semi-finals
(France) Clermont	13
(England) Saracens	9
(France) Toulon (a.e.t.)	25
(Ireland) Leinster	20

Final
(France) Clermont	18
(France) Toulon	24

=== Quarter-finals ===
4 April 2015
15:15

Leinster (Ireland)	18–15	(England) Bath
Pen: Madigan (6/6) 13', 24', 27', 34', 38', 52'	Report	Try: Ford 20' m Hooper 46' c Con: Ford (1/2) 47'; Pen: Ford (1/2) 73'

Aviva Stadium
Attendance: 43,958
Referee: Jérôme Garcès (FFR)

4 April 2015
18:45

Clermont (France)	37–5	(England) Northampton Saints
Try: Nakaitaci (2) 12' c, 30' c Fofana 37' c Abendanon 54' c Con: James (4/4) 13', 32', 38', 55'; Pen: James (3/3) 4', 25', 46'	Report	Try: Waller 66' m

Stade Marcel-Michelin
Attendance: 17,730
Referee: John Lacey (IRFU)

5 April 2015
13:45

Racing Métro (France)	11–12	(England) Saracens
Try: Machenaud 26' m Pen: Machenaud (2/2) 60', 70'	Report	Pen: Hodgson (2/4) 5', 40'; Goode (1/1) 47'; Bosch (1/1) 80+1'

Stade Yves-du-Manoir
Attendance: 12,113
Referee: Nigel Owens (WRU)

5 April 2015
16:15

Toulon (France)	32–18	(England) Wasps
Try: Bastareaud 7' c Williams 76' c Con: Michalak (2/2) 7', 77'; Pen: Michalak (6/6) 16', 22', 27', 35', 38', 68'	Report	Try: Helu (2) 53' c, 72' m Con: Goode (1/2) 54'; Pen: Lozowski (2/2) 12', 25'

Stade Mayol
Attendance: 15,228
Referee: George Clancy (IRFU)

=== Semi-finals ===
18 April 2015
16:15

Clermont (France)	13–9	(England) Saracens
Try: Fofana 43'c Con: James (1/1) 44'; Pen: James (2/2) 25', 72'	Report	Pen: Hodgson (1/1) 36'; Farrell (1/1) 65'; Drop: Hodgson (1/1) 14'

Stade Geoffroy-Guichard, Saint-Étienne
Attendance: 41,500
Referee: George Clancy (IRFU)

19 April 2015
16:15

Toulon (France)	25–20 (A.E.T.)	(Ireland) Leinster
Try: Habana 90' c Con: Halfpenny (1/1) 91'; Pen: Halfpenny (6/7) 5', 29', 55', 67', 83', 89'	Report	Try: O'Brien 94' m Pen: Madigan (5/6) 8', 16', 20', 69', 85'

Stade Vélodrome, Marseille
Attendance: 35,116
Referee: Wayne Barnes (RFU)

=== Final ===
2 May 2015
17:00 BST (UTC+01)

Clermont (France)	18–24	(France) Toulon
Try: Fofana 24' m Abendanon 62' c Con: Lopez (1/2) 62'; Pen: Lopez (2/2) 7', 12'	Report	Try: Bastareaud 40' c Mitchell 69' m Con: Halfpenny (1/2) 40+2'; Pen: Halfpenny (4/5) 16', 28', 32', 51'

Twickenham Stadium, London
Attendance: 56,622
Referee: Nigel Owens (WRU)

== See also ==
- 2014–15 European Rugby Challenge Cup
