= Marc-Antoine Rallier =

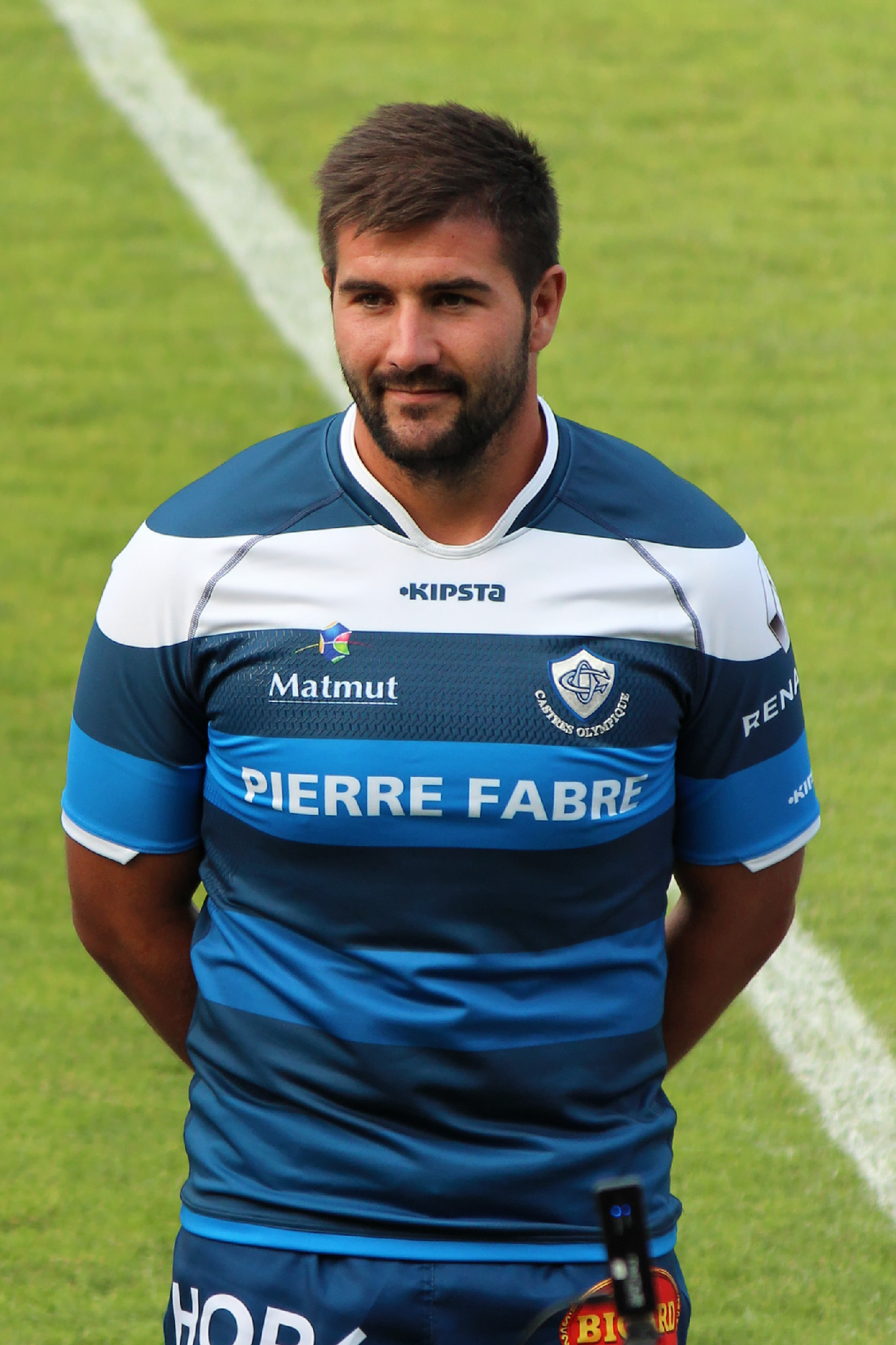
- Born: Marc-Antoine Rallier; 2 December 1988 (age 37) Nantes, France
- Height: 1.81 m (5 ft 11 in)
- Weight: 107 kg (16 st 12 lb)

Rugby union career
- Position: Hooker
Senior career
Years	Team	Apps	(Points)
2009–2010	Castres	14	(0)
2010–2011	Colomiers	27	(0)
2011-	Castres	184	(75)
- Correct as of 6 December 2019
International career
Years	Team	Apps	(Points)
2008	France U20	5	(0)

Marc-Antoine Rallier (born 2 December 1988 in Nantes, France) is a French rugby union player. He currently plays at hooker for Castres in the Top 14.

== Honours ==
=== Club ===
(France) Castres

- Top 14: 2017–18
