= Camille Lopez =

France international rugby union player

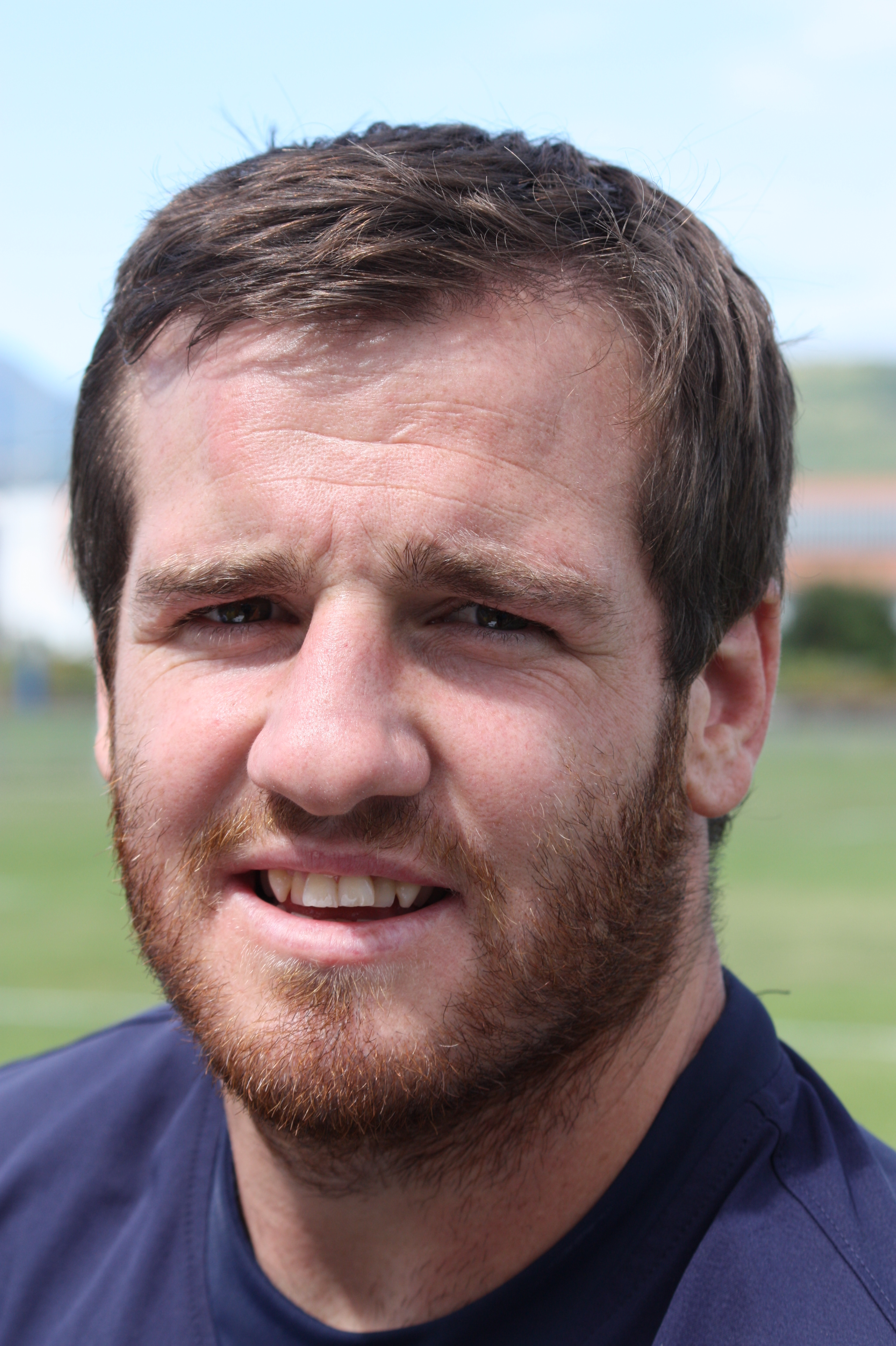
- Camille Lopez while at Clermont Auvergne in 2017.
- Born: Camille Lopez; 3 April 1989 (age 37) Oloron-Sainte-Marie, France
- Height: 1.75 m (5 ft 9 in)
- Weight: 86 kg (13 st 8 lb; 190 lb)

Rugby union career
- Position: Fly-half
Senior career
Years	Team	Apps	(Points)
2008–2009	Mauléon	20	(252)
2009–2013	Bordeaux Bègles	86	(513)
2013–2014	Perpignan	13	(23)
2014–2022	Clermont Auvergne	173	(948)
2022–2025	Bayonne	79	(545)
International career
Years	Team	Apps	(Points)
2013–2019	France	28	(167)

Camille Lopez (born 3 April 1989) is a former French rugby union player. He played as a fly-half for Bordeaux Bègles, Perpignan, Clermont and Bayonne.

== Club career ==
In 2009 it was announced that Lopez would leave SA Mauléon and join Bordeaux, he became an integral part of their team. It has been reported that Lopez has been wanted by ASM Clermont Auvergne, but in 2013 he moved from Bordeaux to Perpignan after scoring over 500 points.

Later, in 2014 Lopez made the move to ASM Clermont Auvergne.

== International career ==
On 14 May 2013, Lopez was announced in the 2013 French tour of New Zealand. He was selected ahead of out of form François Trinh-Duc. He was announced to be starting the first test against New Zealand and played well and scored his first international points with a penalty, after taking over the kicking duties from Maxime Machenaud.

== Honours ==
Clermont

- 1× Top 14: 2017
- 1× European Rugby Challenge Cup: 2019
