= 2023 Six Nations Championship squads =

Rugby union competition squads

The 2023 Six Nations Championship was the 24th edition of the Six Nations Championship, an annual rugby union tournament contested by the men's national teams of England, France, Ireland, Italy, Scotland and Wales. Unlike the Rugby World Cup, teams are not required to name a limited squad for the tournament, and may call up players freely for each match.

Note: Number of caps and players' ages are indicated as of 4 February 2023 – the tournament's opening day. For players added to a squad during the tournament, their caps and age are indicated as of the date of their call-up.

== England ==
On 16 January 2023, England coach Steve Borthwick named a 36-man squad for the 2023 Six Nations Championship.

Head coach: (England) Steve Borthwick

Player	Position	Date of birth (age)	Caps	Club/province
Jamie George	Hooker	20 October 1990 (aged 32)	72	(England) Saracens
George McGuigan	Hooker	30 March 1993 (aged 29)	0	(England) Gloucester
Jack Walker	Hooker	6 May 1996 (aged 26)	0	(England) Harlequins
Dan Cole	Prop	9 May 1987 (aged 35)	95	(England) Leicester Tigers
Ellis Genge	Prop	16 February 1995 (aged 27)	43	(England) Bristol Bears
Joe Heyes	Prop	13 April 1999 (aged 23)	7	(England) Leicester Tigers
Bevan Rodd	Prop	26 August 2000 (aged 22)	2	(England) Sale Sharks
Kyle Sinckler	Prop	30 March 1993 (aged 29)	56	(England) Bristol Bears
Mako Vunipola	Prop	14 January 1991 (aged 32)	74	(England) Saracens
Ollie Chessum	Lock	6 September 2000 (aged 22)	5	(England) Leicester Tigers
Jonny Hill	Lock	8 June 1994 (aged 28)	19	(England) Sale Sharks
Nick Isiekwe	Lock	20 April 1998 (aged 24)	8	(England) Saracens
Maro Itoje	Lock	28 October 1994 (aged 28)	62	(England) Saracens
Ben Curry	Flanker	15 June 1998 (aged 24)	1	(England) Sale Sharks
Ben Earl	Flanker	7 January 1998 (aged 25)	13	(England) Saracens
Courtney Lawes	Flanker	23 February 1989 (aged 33)	96	(England) Northampton Saints
Lewis Ludlam	Flanker	8 December 1995 (aged 27)	14	(England) Northampton Saints
Jack Willis	Flanker	24 December 1996 (aged 26)	6	(France) Toulouse
Alex Dombrandt	Number 8	29 April 1997 (aged 25)	7	(England) Harlequins
Sam Simmonds	Number 8	10 November 1994 (aged 28)	18	(England) Exeter Chiefs
Alex Mitchell	Scrum-half	25 May 1997 (aged 25)	1	(England) Northampton Saints
Jack van Poortvliet	Scrum-half	15 May 2001 (aged 21)	7	(England) Leicester Tigers
Ben Youngs	Scrum-half	5 September 1989 (aged 33)	121	(England) Leicester Tigers
Owen Farrell	Fly-half	24 September 1991 (aged 31)	101	(England) Saracens
Fin Smith	Fly-half	11 May 2002 (aged 20)	0	(England) Northampton Saints
Marcus Smith	Fly-half	14 February 1999 (aged 23)	17	(England) Harlequins
Elliot Daly	Centre	8 October 1992 (aged 30)	57	(England) Saracens
Dan Kelly	Centre	16 June 2001 (aged 21)	1	(England) Leicester Tigers
Joe Marchant	Centre	16 July 1996 (aged 26)	13	(England) Harlequins
Henry Slade	Centre	19 March 1993 (aged 29)	52	(England) Exeter Chiefs
Manu Tuilagi	Centre	18 May 1991 (aged 31)	50	(England) Sale Sharks
Ollie Hassell-Collins	Wing	17 January 1999 (aged 24)	0	(England) London Irish
Max Malins	Wing	7 January 1997 (aged 26)	14	(England) Saracens
Cadan Murley	Wing	31 July 1999 (aged 23)	0	(England) Harlequins
Tommy Freeman	Fullback	5 March 2001 (aged 21)	3	(England) Northampton Saints
Freddie Steward	Fullback	5 December 2000 (aged 22)	17	(England) Leicester Tigers

=== Call-ups ===
On 29 January 2023, Borthwick named an updated 36-player squad, ahead of the opening fixture against Scotland on 4 February 2023, which added several players to the original squad, following injuries to Elliot Daly, Dan Kelly, Courtney Lawes, George McGuigan and Henry Slade.

On 6 February 2023, Borthwick named a revised 36-player squad for the second round fixture against Italy on 12 February 2023, which included a number of players returning from injury.

On 19 February 2023, Borthwick named an altered 36-player squad for the third round fixture against Wales on 25 February 2023, which recalled several veterans and two uncapped players.

On 28 February 2023, Borthwick named a 26-player training squad for the fallow week ahead of the fourth round fixture against France on 11 March 2023, which gave a recall to Jonny May.

On 13 March 2023, Borthwick named the final 36-player squad ahead of the last round fixture against Ireland on 18 March 2023, with new call-ups in place of Ollie Chessum and Ollie Lawrence, who withdrew because of injury.

Player	Position	Date of birth (age)	Caps	Club/province
Tom Dunn	Hooker	12 November 1992 (aged 30)	3	(England) Bath
Will Collier	Prop	5 May 1991 (aged 31)	2	(England) Harlequins
David Ribbans	Lock	29 August 1995 (aged 27)	3	(England) Northampton Saints
Tom Curry	Flanker	15 June 1998 (aged 24)	46	(England) Sale Sharks
George Martin	Flanker	18 June 2001 (aged 21)	1	(England) Leicester Tigers
George Ford	Fly-half	16 March 1993 (aged 29)	84	(England) Sale Sharks
Fraser Dingwall	Centre	7 April 1999 (aged 23)	0	(England) Northampton Saints
Ollie Lawrence	Centre	18 September 1999 (aged 23)	6	(England) Bath
Guy Porter	Centre	23 January 1997 (aged 26)	4	(England) Leicester Tigers
Jonny May	Wing	1 April 1990 (aged 32)	72	(England) Gloucester
Anthony Watson	Wing	26 February 1994 (aged 28)	51	(England) Leicester Tigers
Henry Arundell	Fullback	8 November 2002 (aged 20)	3	(England) London Irish

== France ==
On 17 January 2023, France head coach Fabien Galthié named a 42-man squad for the 2023 Six Nations Championship.

Head coach: (France) Fabien Galthié

Player	Position	Date of birth (age)	Caps	Club/province
Gaëtan Barlot	Hooker	13 April 1997 (aged 25)	4	(France) Castres
Teddy Baubigny	Hooker	2 September 1998 (aged 24)	1	(France) Racing 92
Julien Marchand	Hooker	10 May 1995 (aged 27)	24	(France) Toulouse
Uini Atonio	Prop	26 March 1990 (aged 32)	47	(France) La Rochelle
Cyril Baille	Prop	15 September 1993 (aged 29)	38	(France) Toulouse
Sipili Falatea	Prop	6 June 1997 (aged 25)	7	(France) Bordeaux
Mohamed Haouas	Prop	9 June 1994 (aged 28)	15	(France) Montpellier
Dany Priso	Prop	2 January 1994 (aged 29)	18	(France) Toulon
Reda Wardi	Prop	2 August 1995 (aged 27)	2	(France) La Rochelle
Bastien Chalureau	Lock	13 February 1992 (aged 30)	2	(France) Montpellier
Thibaud Flament	Lock	29 April 1997 (aged 25)	11	(France) Toulouse
Thomas Jolmès	Lock	8 October 1995 (aged 27)	1	(France) Bordeaux
Thomas Lavault	Lock	3 May 1999 (aged 23)	2	(France) La Rochelle
Romain Taofifenua	Lock	14 September 1990 (aged 32)	38	(France) Lyon
Paul Willemse	Lock	13 November 1992 (aged 30)	24	(France) Montpellier
Gregory Alldritt	Back row	23 March 1997 (aged 25)	34	(France) La Rochelle
Alexandre Bécognée	Back row	3 September 1996 (aged 26)	1	(France) Montpellier
Yacouba Camara	Back row	2 June 1994 (aged 28)	17	(France) Montpellier
Dylan Cretin	Back row	4 May 1997 (aged 25)	20	(France) Lyon
François Cros	Back row	25 March 1994 (aged 28)	16	(France) Toulouse
Anthony Jelonch	Back row	28 July 1998 (aged 24)	22	(France) Toulouse
Sekou Macalou	Back row	20 April 1995 (aged 27)	11	(France) Stade Français
Charles Ollivon	Back row	11 May 1993 (aged 29)	28	(France) Toulon
Alexandre Roumat	Back row	27 June 1997 (aged 25)	0	(France) Toulouse
Antoine Dupont (c)	Scrum-half	15 November 1996 (aged 26)	42	(France) Toulouse
Léo Coly	Scrum-half	9 September 1999 (aged 23)	0	(France) Montpellier
Nolann Le Garrec	Scrum-half	14 May 2002 (aged 20)	0	(France) Racing 92
Antoine Hastoy	Fly-half	4 June 1997 (aged 25)	2	(France) La Rochelle
Matthieu Jalibert	Fly-half	6 November 1998 (aged 24)	20	(France) Bordeaux
Romain Ntamack	Fly-half	1 May 1999 (aged 23)	31	(France) Toulouse
Pierre-Louis Barassi	Centre	22 April 1998 (aged 24)	3	(France) Toulouse
Julien Delbouis	Centre	14 August 1998 (aged 24)	0	(France) Stade Français
Gaël Fickou	Centre	26 March 1994 (aged 28)	74	(France) Racing 92
Émilien Gailleton	Centre	13 July 2003 (aged 19)	0	(France) Pau
Yoram Moefana	Centre	18 July 2000 (aged 22)	11	(France) Bordeaux
Louis Bielle-Biarrey	Wing	16 June 2003 (aged 19)	0	(France) Bordeaux
Ethan Dumortier	Wing	29 December 2000 (aged 22)	0	(France) Lyon
Matthis Lebel	Wing	25 March 1999 (aged 23)	5	(France) Toulouse
Damian Penaud	Wing	25 September 1996 (aged 26)	37	(France) Clermont
Romain Buros	Fullback	31 July 1997 (aged 25)	0	(France) Bordeaux
Melvyn Jaminet	Fullback	30 June 1999 (aged 23)	12	(France) Toulouse
Thomas Ramos	Fullback	23 July 1995 (aged 27)	20	(France) Toulouse

=== Call-ups ===
On 29 January, Clément Castets, Baptiste Couilloud and Gabin Villière were called-up to the squad, while Dany Priso, Thomas Jolmès and Léo Coly were released. Alexandre Roumat also replaced an injured Paul Boudehent on the same day.

On 30 January, Thomas Jolmès was immediately called back after Yacouba Camara withdrew injured following Montpellier's game at Toulouse the previous day.

On 19 February, Jonathan Danty, Ibrahim Diallo, Thomas Lavault and Yoan Tanga were called up ahead of the third round match against Scotland.

On 3 March, Dorian Aldegheri, Léo Berdeu, Thomas Jolmès, Enzo Reybier and Bastien Vergnes-Taillefer were called up ahead of the final two rounds against England and Wales.

Player	Position	Date of birth (age)	Caps	Club/province
Peato Mauvaka	Hooker	January 10, 1997 (aged 26)	19	(France) Toulouse
Dorian Aldegheri	Prop	August 4, 1993 (aged 29)	9	(France) Toulouse
Clément Castets	Prop	5 May 1996 (aged 26)	0	(France) Stade Français
Thomas Jolmès	Lock	October 8, 1995 (aged 27)	1	(France) Bordeaux
Thomas Lavault	Lock	May 3, 1999 (aged 23)	2	(France) La Rochelle
Ibrahim Diallo	Back row	January 23, 1998 (aged 25)	1	(France) Racing 92
Yoan Tanga	Back row	November 29, 1996 (aged 26)	2	(France) Racing 92
Bastien Vergnes-Taillefer	Back row	June 13, 1997 (aged 25)	0	(France) Bordeaux
Baptiste Couilloud	Scrum-half	22 August 1997 (aged 25)	11	(France) Lyon
Léo Berdeu	Fly-half	June 13, 1998 (aged 24)	0	(France) Lyon
Jonathan Danty	Centre	October 7, 1992 (aged 30)	18	(France) La Rochelle
Enzo Reybier	Wing	April 4, 2002 (aged 20)	0	(France) Oyonnax
Gabin Villière	Wing	13 December 1995 (aged 27)	12	(France) Toulon

== Ireland ==
On 19 January 2023, Ireland coach Andy Farrell named a 37-man squad for the 2023 Six Nations Championship. (Caps updated 19 March 2023)

Head coach: (England) Andy Farrell

Player	Position	Date of birth (age)	Caps	Club/province
Rob Herring	Hooker	28 April 1990 (aged 32)	34	(Ireland) Ulster
Rónan Kelleher	Hooker	24 January 1998 (aged 25)	21	(Ireland) Leinster
Dan Sheehan	Hooker	17 September 1998 (aged 24)	17	(Ireland) Leinster
Finlay Bealham	Prop	9 October 1991 (aged 31)	30	(Ireland) Connacht
Tadhg Furlong	Prop	14 November 1992 (aged 30)	65	(Ireland) Leinster
Cian Healy	Prop	7 October 1987 (aged 35)	123	(Ireland) Leinster
Dave Kilcoyne	Prop	14 December 1988 (aged 34)	51	(Ireland) Munster
Tom O'Toole	Prop	23 September 1998 (aged 24)	9	(Ireland) Ulster
Andrew Porter	Prop	16 January 1996 (aged 27)	53	(Ireland) Leinster
Ryan Baird	Lock	26 July 1999 (aged 23)	11	(Ireland) Leinster
Tadhg Beirne	Lock	8 January 1992 (aged 31)	38	(Ireland) Munster
Iain Henderson	Lock	21 February 1992 (aged 30)	72	(Ireland) Ulster
Joe McCarthy	Lock	26 March 2001 (aged 21)	1	(Ireland) Leinster
James Ryan	Lock	24 July 1996 (aged 26)	53	(Ireland) Leinster
Jack Conan	Back row	29 July 1992 (aged 30)	38	(Ireland) Leinster
Gavin Coombes	Back row	11 December 1997 (aged 25)	2	(Ireland) Munster
Caelan Doris	Back row	2 April 1998 (aged 24)	28	(Ireland) Leinster
Peter O'Mahony	Back row	17 September 1989 (aged 33)	94	(Ireland) Munster
Cian Prendergast	Back row	23 February 2000 (aged 22)	1	(Ireland) Connacht
Josh van der Flier	Back row	25 April 1993 (aged 29)	50	(Ireland) Leinster
Craig Casey	Scrum-half	19 April 1999 (aged 23)	10	(Ireland) Munster
Jamison Gibson-Park	Scrum-half	23 February 1992 (aged 30)	25	(Ireland) Leinster
Conor Murray	Scrum-half	20 April 1989 (aged 33)	105	(Ireland) Munster
Ross Byrne	Fly-half	8 April 1995 (aged 27)	19	(Ireland) Leinster
Jack Crowley	Fly-half	13 January 2000 (aged 23)	3	(Ireland) Munster
Johnny Sexton (c)	Fly-half	11 July 1985 (aged 37)	113	(Ireland) Leinster
Bundee Aki	Centre	7 April 1990 (aged 32)	46	(Ireland) Connacht
Keith Earls	Centre	2 October 1987 (aged 35)	98	(Ireland) Munster
Robbie Henshaw	Centre	12 June 1993 (aged 29)	63	(Ireland) Leinster
Stuart McCloskey	Centre	6 August 1992 (aged 30)	12	(Ireland) Ulster
Garry Ringrose	Centre	26 January 1995 (aged 28)	50	(Ireland) Leinster
Mack Hansen	Wing	27 March 1998 (aged 24)	14	(Ireland) Connacht
Jordan Larmour	Wing	10 June 1997 (aged 25)	30	(Ireland) Leinster
James Lowe	Wing	8 July 1992 (aged 30)	20	(Ireland) Leinster
Jacob Stockdale	Wing	3 April 1996 (aged 26)	35	(Ireland) Ulster
Hugo Keenan	Fullback	18 June 1996 (aged 26)	30	(Ireland) Leinster
Jimmy O'Brien	Fullback	27 November 1995 (aged 27)	5	(Ireland) Leinster
Jamie Osborne	Fullback	16 November 2001 (aged 21)	0	(Ireland) Leinster

=== Call-ups ===
On 30 January, Tom Stewart was called up as injury cover at hooker, with Rónan Kelleher an injury concern ahead of the tournament.

On 6 February, Michael Milne and Caolin Blade were called up as injury cover, and Roman Salanoa was retained after being called up for injury cover.

On 20 February, Scott Penny, Kieran Treadwell and Joey Carbery were called up as injury cover.

On 3 March, Nick Timoney and Ciaran Frawley were called up.

Player	Position	Date of birth (age)	Caps	Club/province
Tom Stewart	Hooker	23 September 2001 (aged 21)	6	(Ireland) Ulster
Roman Salanoa	Prop	28 October 1997 (aged 25)	0	(Ireland) Munster
Michael Milne	Prop	5 February 1999 (aged 23)	0	(Ireland) Leinster
Kieran Treadwell	Lock	11 June 1998 (aged 24)	11	(Ireland) Ulster
Scott Penny	Back row	22 September 1999 (aged 23)	0	(Ireland) Leinster
Nick Timoney	Back row	1 August 1995 (aged 27)	3	(Ireland) Ulster
Caolin Blade	Scrum-half	29 April 1994 (aged 28)	1	(Ireland) Connacht
Joey Carbery	Fly-half	11 January 1995 (aged 28)	37	(Ireland) Munster
Ciaran Frawley	Fly-half	4 December 1997 (aged 25)	0	(Ireland) Leinster

== Italy ==
On 10 January, Italy head coach Kieran Crowley announced an initial 34-man squad for their opening two matches of the tournament against France on 5 February and England on 12 February.

Head coach: (New Zealand) Kieran Crowley

Player	Position	Date of birth (age)	Caps	Club/province
Luca Bigi	Hooker	19 April 1991 (aged 31)	42	(Italy) Zebre Parma
Marco Manfredi	Hooker	18 September 1997 (aged 25)	0	(Italy) Zebre Parma
Giacomo Nicotera	Hooker	15 July 1996 (aged 26)	7	(Italy) Benetton
Pietro Ceccarelli	Prop	16 February 1992 (aged 30)	24	(France) Brive
Simone Ferrari	Prop	28 March 1994 (aged 28)	40	(Italy) Benetton
Danilo Fischetti	Prop	26 January 1998 (aged 25)	25	(England) London Irish
Matteo Nocera	Prop	16 January 1999 (aged 24)	0	(Italy) Zebre Parma
Marco Riccioni	Prop	19 October 1997 (aged 25)	18	(England) Saracens
Luca Rizzoli	Prop	3 May 2002 (aged 20)	0	(Italy) Zebre Parma
Mirco Spagnolo	Prop	2 January 2001 (aged 22)	0	(Italy) Petrarca
Federico Zani	Prop	9 April 1989 (aged 33)	14	(Italy) Benetton
Niccolò Cannone	Lock	17 May 1998 (aged 24)	25	(Italy) Benetton
Marco Fuser	Lock	9 March 1991 (aged 31)	41	(France) Massy
Federico Ruzza	Lock	4 August 1994 (aged 28)	36	(Italy) Benetton
Andrea Zambonin	Lock	3 September 2000 (aged 22)	2	(Italy) Zebre Parma
Lorenzo Cannone	Back row	28 January 2001 (aged 22)	3	(Italy) Benetton
Michele Lamaro (c)	Back row	3 June 1998 (aged 24)	21	(Italy) Benetton
Sebastian Negri	Back row	30 June 1994 (aged 28)	40	(Italy) Benetton
Giovanni Pettinelli	Back row	13 March 1996 (aged 26)	8	(Italy) Benetton
Jake Polledri	Back row	8 November 1995 (aged 27)	19	(England) Gloucester
Manuel Zuliani	Back row	26 April 2000 (aged 22)	6	(Italy) Benetton
Alessandro Fusco	Scrum-half	28 October 1999 (aged 23)	8	(Italy) Zebre Parma
Alessandro Garbisi	Scrum-half	11 April 2002 (aged 20)	3	(Italy) Benetton
Stephen Varney	Scrum-half	16 May 2001 (aged 21)	15	(England) Gloucester
Tommaso Allan	Fly-half	26 April 1993 (aged 29)	66	(England) Harlequins
Giacomo Da Re	Fly-half	29 March 1999 (aged 23)	1	(Italy) Benetton
Ignacio Brex	Centre	26 May 1992 (aged 30)	18	(Italy) Benetton
Enrico Lucchin	Centre	4 April 1995 (aged 27)	1	(Italy) Zebre Parma
Tommaso Menoncello	Centre	20 August 2002 (aged 20)	6	(Italy) Benetton
Luca Morisi	Centre	22 February 1991 (aged 31)	39	(England) London Irish
Pierre Bruno	Wing	28 June 1996 (aged 26)	7	(Italy) Zebre Parma
Matteo Minozzi	Wing	4 June 1996 (aged 26)	24	(Italy) Benetton
Ange Capuozzo	Fullback	30 April 1999 (aged 23)	7	(France) Toulouse
Edoardo Padovani	Fullback	15 March 1993 (aged 29)	40	(Italy) Benetton

=== Call-ups ===
On 29 January, Italy reduced the squad for the first two rounds and included call-ups for Riccardo Favretto, Paolo Garbisi and Edoardo Iachizzi. At the same time it also saw the withdrawal of Marco Fuser, Matteo Nocera, Mirco Spagnolo and Andrea Zambonin.

On 20 February, Jake Polledri was announced to have withdrawn from the squad due to injury, whilst Paolo Buonfiglio, Andrea Zambonin and Giovanni Montemauri were called up ahead of round 3.

On 8 March, Italy named an updated squad ahead of the final two rounds which included the call ups for Page Relo, Marco Zanon and Simone Gesi.

Player	Position	Date of birth (age)	Caps	Club/province
Paolo Buonfiglio	Lock	28 January 1995 (aged 28)	0	(Italy) Zebre Parma
Riccardo Favretto	Lock	18 October 2001 (aged 21)	0	(Italy) Benetton
Edoardo Iachizzi	Lock	26 May 1998 (aged 24)	0	(France) Vannes
Andrea Zambonin	Lock	3 September 2000 (aged 22)	2	(Italy) Zebre Parma
Martin Page-Relo	Scrum-half	6 January 1999 (aged 24)	0	(France) Toulouse
Paolo Garbisi	Fly-half	26 April 2000 (aged 22)	21	(France) Montpellier
Giovanni Montemauri	Fly-half	24 October 2000 (aged 22)	0	(Italy) Rugby Rovigo Delta
Marco Zanon	Centre	3 October 1997 (aged 25)	15	(Italy) Benetton
Simone Gesi	Wing	23 May 2001 (aged 21)	0	(Italy) Zebre Parma

== Scotland ==
On 17 January 2023, Scotland coach Gregor Townsend named a 40-man squad for the 2023 Six Nations Championship.

Head coach: (Scotland) Gregor Townsend

Player	Position	Date of birth (age)	Caps	Club/province
Ewan Ashman	Hooker	3 April 2000 (aged 22)	6	(England) Sale Sharks
Fraser Brown	Hooker	20 June 1989 (aged 33)	57	(Scotland) Glasgow Warriors
Dave Cherry	Hooker	3 January 1991 (aged 32)	8	(Scotland) Edinburgh
George Turner	Hooker	8 October 1992 (aged 30)	30	(Scotland) Glasgow Warriors
Simon Berghan	Prop	7 December 1990 (aged 32)	31	(Scotland) Glasgow Warriors
Jamie Bhatti	Prop	8 September 1993 (aged 29)	24	(Scotland) Glasgow Warriors
Zander Fagerson	Prop	19 January 1996 (aged 27)	54	(Scotland) Glasgow Warriors
WP Nel	Prop	30 April 1986 (aged 36)	50	(Scotland) Edinburgh
Pierre Schoeman	Prop	7 May 1994 (aged 28)	16	(Scotland) Edinburgh
Javan Sebastian	Prop	2 September 1994 (aged 28)	3	(Wales) Scarlets
Rory Sutherland	Prop	24 August 1992 (aged 30)	22	(Ireland) Ulster
Grant Gilchrist	Lock	9 August 1990 (aged 32)	59	(Scotland) Edinburgh
Jonny Gray	Lock	24 March 1994 (aged 28)	72	(England) Exeter Chiefs
Richie Gray	Lock	24 August 1989 (aged 33)	69	(Scotland) Glasgow Warriors
Cameron Henderson	Lock	13 January 2000 (aged 23)	0	(England) Leicester Tigers
Sam Skinner	Lock	31 January 1995 (aged 28)	23	(Scotland) Edinburgh
Josh Bayliss	Back row	18 September 1997 (aged 25)	3	(England) Bath
Andy Christie	Back row	27 March 1999 (aged 23)	4	(England) Saracens
Luke Crosbie	Back row	22 April 1997 (aged 25)	2	(Scotland) Edinburgh
Jack Dempsey	Back row	12 April 1994 (aged 28)	4	(Scotland) Glasgow Warriors
Matt Fagerson	Back row	16 July 1998 (aged 24)	28	(Scotland) Glasgow Warriors
Jamie Ritchie (c)	Back row	16 August 1996 (aged 26)	36	(Scotland) Edinburgh
Hamish Watson	Back row	15 October 1991 (aged 31)	54	(Scotland) Edinburgh
George Horne	Scrum-half	12 May 1995 (aged 27)	18	(Scotland) Glasgow Warriors
Ali Price	Scrum-half	12 May 1993 (aged 29)	58	(Scotland) Glasgow Warriors
Ben White	Scrum-half	27 May 1998 (aged 24)	9	(Scotland) London Irish
Ben Healy	Fly-half	29 June 1999 (aged 23)	0	(Ireland) Munster
Blair Kinghorn	Fly-half	18 January 1997 (aged 26)	38	(Scotland) Edinburgh
Finn Russell	Fly-half	23 September 1992 (aged 30)	65	(France) Racing 92
Chris Harris	Centre	28 December 1990 (aged 32)	39	(England) Gloucester
Huw Jones	Centre	17 December 1993 (aged 29)	31	(Scotland) Glasgow Warriors
Stafford McDowall	Centre	24 February 1998 (aged 24)	0	(Scotland) Glasgow Warriors
Cameron Redpath	Centre	23 December 1999 (aged 23)	4	(England) Bath
Sione Tuipulotu	Centre	12 February 1997 (aged 25)	11	(Scotland) Glasgow Warriors
Sean Maitland	Wing	14 September 1988 (aged 34)	53	(England) Saracens
Ruaridh McConnochie	Wing	23 October 1991 (aged 31)	0	(England) Bath
Kyle Steyn	Wing	29 January 1994 (aged 29)	5	(Scotland) Glasgow Warriors
Duhan van der Merwe	Wing	4 June 1995 (aged 27)	23	(Scotland) Edinburgh
Stuart Hogg	Fullback	24 June 1992 (aged 30)	96	(England) Exeter Chiefs
Ollie Smith	Fullback	7 August 2000 (aged 22)	2	(Scotland) Glasgow Warriors

=== Call-ups ===
On 7 February 2023, Andy Christie returned to his club due to injury and Scott Cummings joined up with the squad as his replacement.

On 7 March 2023, Rory Darge joined up with the squad ahead of the fourth round.

On 14 March 2023, Stuart Hogg and Finn Russell withdrew from the squad due to injury and Charlie Savala was called up to the squad as cover.

Player	Position	Date of birth (age)	Caps	Club/province
Scott Cummings	Lock	3 December 1996 (aged 26)	23	(Scotland) Glasgow Warriors
Rory Darge	Flanker	23 February 2000 (aged 22)	7	(Scotland) Glasgow Warriors
Charlie Savala	Fly-half	21 April 2000 (aged 22)	0	(Scotland) Edinburgh

== Wales ==
Wales coach Warren Gatland named a 37-man squad for the tournament on 17 January 2023.

Head coach: (New Zealand) Warren Gatland

Player	Position	Date of birth (age)	Caps	Club/province
Dewi Lake	Hooker	16 May 1999 (aged 23)	8	(Wales) Ospreys
Ken Owens (c)	Hooker	3 January 1987 (aged 36)	86	(Wales) Scarlets
Bradley Roberts	Hooker	4 January 1996 (aged 27)	3	(Wales) Dragons
Rhys Carré	Prop	8 February 1998 (aged 24)	17	(Wales) Cardiff
Leon Brown	Prop	26 October 1996 (aged 26)	22	(Wales) Dragons
Tomas Francis	Prop	27 April 1992 (aged 30)	67	(Wales) Ospreys
Wyn Jones	Prop	26 February 1992 (aged 30)	45	(Wales) Scarlets
Dillon Lewis	Prop	4 January 1996 (aged 27)	45	(Wales) Cardiff
Gareth Thomas	Prop	2 August 1993 (aged 29)	17	(Wales) Ospreys
Adam Beard	Lock	7 January 1996 (aged 27)	41	(Wales) Ospreys
Rhys Davies	Lock	9 November 1998 (aged 24)	0	(Wales) Ospreys
Dafydd Jenkins	Lock	5 December 2002 (aged 20)	1	(England) Exeter Chiefs
Alun Wyn Jones	Lock	19 September 1985 (aged 37)	155	(Wales) Ospreys
Teddy Williams	Lock	18 October 2000 (aged 22)	0	(Wales) Cardiff
Taulupe Faletau	Back row	12 November 1990 (aged 32)	95	(Wales) Cardiff
Jac Morgan	Back row	21 January 2000 (aged 23)	6	(Wales) Ospreys
Tommy Reffell	Back row	27 April 1999 (aged 23)	4	(England) Leicester Tigers
Justin Tipuric	Back row	6 August 1989 (aged 33)	89	(Wales) Ospreys
Christ Tshiunza	Back row	9 January 2002 (aged 21)	3	(England) Exeter Chiefs
Aaron Wainwright	Back row	25 September 1997 (aged 25)	36	(Wales) Dragons
Kieran Hardy	Scrum-half	30 November 1995 (aged 27)	16	(Wales) Scarlets
Rhys Webb	Scrum-half	9 December 1988 (aged 34)	36	(Wales) Ospreys
Tomos Williams	Scrum-half	1 January 1995 (aged 28)	40	(Wales) Cardiff
Dan Biggar	Fly-half	16 October 1989 (aged 33)	103	(France) Toulon
Rhys Patchell	Fly-half	17 May 1993 (aged 29)	21	(Wales) Scarlets
Owen Williams	Fly-half	27 February 1992 (aged 30)	3	(Wales) Ospreys
Mason Grady	Centre	29 March 2002 (aged 20)	0	(Wales) Cardiff
Joe Hawkins	Centre	11 June 2002 (aged 20)	1	(Wales) Ospreys
George North	Centre	13 April 1992 (aged 30)	109	(Wales) Ospreys
Nick Tompkins	Centre	16 February 1995 (aged 27)	25	(England) Saracens
Keiran Williams	Centre	12 April 1997 (aged 25)	0	(Wales) Ospreys
Josh Adams	Wing	21 April 1995 (aged 27)	44	(Wales) Cardiff
Alex Cuthbert	Wing	5 April 1990 (aged 32)	55	(Wales) Ospreys
Rio Dyer	Wing	21 December 1999 (aged 23)	3	(Wales) Dragons
Louis Rees-Zammit	Wing	2 February 2001 (aged 22)	22	(England) Gloucester
Leigh Halfpenny	Fullback	22 December 1988 (aged 34)	97	(Wales) Scarlets
Liam Williams	Fullback	9 April 1991 (aged 31)	81	(Wales) Cardiff

=== Call-ups ===
On 24 January 2023, Scott Baldwin was called up to replace Dewi Lake.

Player	Position	Date of birth (age)	Caps	Club/province
Scott Baldwin	Hooker	12 July 1988 (aged 34)	34	(Wales) Ospreys
