= 2022 France rugby union tour of Japan =

- Coach: Fabien Galthié
- Tour captain: Charles Ollivon
Summary
P	W	D	L
Total
2	2	0	0
Test match
2	2	0	0
Opponent
P	W	D	L
Japan
2	2	0	0

Tour chronology
- ← Australia 2021 Argentina 2024 →

In July 2022, France played a two-test series against Japan as part of the 2022 mid-year rugby union tests. The first test was played at Toyota Stadium in Aichi on 2 July, followed by the second test at Japan National Stadium in Tokyo on 9 July.

Coming into the series, France were ranked in second place in the World Rugby Rankings, while Japan sat eight places below in tenth. The two nations last faced each other in a test match during 2017 end-of-year rugby union internationals, which ended up in a 23-23 draw.

== Fixtures ==
Date	Venue	Home	Score	Away
2 July 2022	Toyota Stadium, Toyota	Japan	23–42	France
9 July 2022	Japan National Stadium, Tokyo	Japan	15–20	France

== Squads ==
=== France ===
Among the starting 15 French players, 2 of them earned their first caps and 4 more had single-digit caps. French coach intended to give test experience to the fringe players.

Notes: ^{1} On 23 June 2022, Dorian Aldegheri withdrew from the squad following a thigh injury, while Aymeric Luc and Max Spring were on standby, being COVID-19 positive like assistant coaches Shaun Edwards and Laurent Labit. On 25 June 2022, Luc and Spring tested negative and joined the rest of the team in Japan.

Head coach: (France) Fabien Galthié

Player	Position	Date of birth (age)	Caps	Club/province
Pierre Bourgarit	Hooker	12 September 1997 (age 28)	5	(France) La Rochelle
Peato Mauvaka	Hooker	10 January 1997 (age 29)	14	(France) Toulouse
Christopher Tolofua	Hooker	31 December 1993 (age 32)	7	(France) Toulon
Dorian Aldegheri^{1}	Prop	4 August 1993 (age 32)	8	(France) Toulouse
Demba Bamba	Prop	17 March 1998 (age 28)	23	(France) Lyon
Sipili Falatea	Prop	6 June 1997 (age 29)	2	(France) Clermont
Jean-Baptiste Gros	Prop	29 May 1999 (age 27)	19	(France) Toulon
Thomas Laclayat	Prop	2 October 1997 (age 28)	0	(France) Oyonnax
Matis Perchaud	Prop	17 September 2002 (age 23)	0	(France) Bayonne
Dany Priso	Prop	2 January 1994 (age 32)	14	(France) La Rochelle
Thibaud Flament	Lock	29 April 1997 (age 29)	7	(France) Toulouse
Thomas Jolmès	Lock	8 October 1995 (age 30)	0	(France) Bordeaux
Thomas Lavault	Lock	3 May 1999 (age 27)	0	(France) La Rochelle
Rémi Picquette	Lock	23 February 1995 (age 31)	0	(France) La Rochelle
Swan Rebbadj	Lock	15 January 1995 (age 31)	3	(France) Toulon
Dylan Cretin	Back row	4 May 1997 (age 29)	18	(France) Lyon
Ibrahim Diallo	Back row	23 January 1998 (age 28)	1	(France) Racing 92
Matthias Haddad	Back row	10 March 2001 (age 25)	0	(France) La Rochelle
Sekou Macalou	Back row	20 April 1995 (age 31)	7	(France) Stade Français
Charles Ollivon (c)	Back row	11 May 1993 (age 33)	23	(France) Toulon
Yoan Tanga	Back row	29 November 1996 (age 29)	0	(France) Racing 92
Selevasio Tolofua	Back row	31 May 1997 (age 29)	1	(France) Toulouse
Bastien Vergnes-Taillefer	Back row	13 June 1997 (age 29)	0	(France) Bordeaux
Baptiste Couilloud	Scrum-half	22 July 1997 (age 28)	8	(France) Lyon
Nolann Le Garrec	Scrum-half	14 May 2002 (age 24)	0	(France) Racing 92
Maxime Lucu	Scrum-half	12 January 1993 (age 33)	7	(France) Bordeaux
Louis Carbonel	Fly-half	4 February 1999 (age 27)	5	(France) Toulon
Antoine Hastoy	Fly-half	4 June 1997 (age 29)	1	(France) Pau
Matthieu Jalibert	Fly-half	6 November 1998 (age 27)	15	(France) Bordeaux
Jules Favre	Centre	22 March 1999 (age 27)	0	(France) La Rochelle
Louis Le Brun	Centre	22 February 2002 (age 24)	0	(France) Castres
Yoram Moefana	Centre	18 July 2000 (age 25)	6	(France) Bordeaux
Virimi Vakatawa	Centre	1 May 1992 (age 34)	30	(France) Racing 92
Tani Vili	Centre	31 October 2000 (age 25)	0	(France) Clermont
Rémy Baget	Wing	27 July 1997 (age 28)	0	(France) Bayonne
Matthis Lebel	Wing	25 March 1999 (age 27)	2	(France) Toulouse
Damian Penaud	Wing	25 September 1996 (age 29)	32	(France) Clermont
Enzo Reybier	Wing	4 April 2002 (age 24)	0	(France) Oyonnax
Romain Buros	Fullback	31 July 1997 (age 28)	0	(France) Bordeaux
Melvyn Jaminet	Fullback	30 June 1999 (age 27)	11	(France) Perpignan
Aymeric Luc^{1}	Fullback	14 October 1997 (age 28)	0	(France) Toulon
Max Spring^{1}	Fullback	15 March 2001 (age 25)	0	(France) Racing 92

=== Japan ===
On 31 May, a 34-man squad was named for Japan's 2-test series against Uruguay and their 2-test series against France.

On 7 June, Yutaka Nagare withdrew from the squad due to injury and Toshiya Takahashi was called up as his replacement.

On 17 June, Craig Millar withdrew from the squad due to injury and Shogo Miura was called up as his replacement. Also called up were, Takayasu Tsuji, Wimpie van der Walt and Tevita Tatafu.

On 27 June, Kaito Shigeno joined up with the squad ahead of Japan's 2-test series against France replacing Toshiya Takahashi and Amanaki Saumaki also withdrew due to injury.

- Head Coach: (New Zealand) Jamie Joseph

Player	Position	Date of birth (age)	Caps	Club/province
Daigo Hashimoto	Hooker	28 January 1994 (age 32)	2	Toshiba Brave Lupus Tokyo
Shota Horie	Hooker	21 January 1986 (age 40)	67	Saitama Wild Knights
Atsushi Sakate	Hooker	21 June 1993 (age 33)	28	Saitama Wild Knights
Asaeli Ai Valu	Prop	7 May 1989 (age 37)	21	Saitama Wild Knights
Keita Inagaki	Prop	2 June 1990 (age 36)	40	Saitama Wild Knights
Shinnosuke Kakinaga	Prop	19 December 1991 (age 34)	20	Tokyo Sungoliath
Yusuke Kizu	Prop	12 March 1995 (age 31)	4	Toyota Verblitz
Shogo Miura	Prop	8 June 1995 (age 31)	9	Toyota Verblitz
Yukio Morikawa	Prop	6 February 1993 (age 33)	0	Tokyo Sungoliath
Warner Dearns	Lock	11 April 2002 (age 24)	2	Toshiba Brave Lupus Tokyo
Takayasu Tsuji	Lock	28 October 1995 (age 30)	0	Tokyo Sungoliath
Wimpie van der Walt	Lock	6 January 1989 (age 37)	19	NTT DoCoMo Red Hurricanes Osaka
Sanaila Waqa	Lock	17 July 1995 (age 30)	1	Hanazono Kintetsu Liners
Jack Cornelsen	Back row	13 October 1994 (age 31)	7	Saitama Wild Knights
Masato Furukawa	Back row	6 December 1996 (age 29)	3	Toyota Verblitz
Ben Gunter	Back row	24 October 1997 (age 28)	3	Saitama Wild Knights
Lappies Labuschagné	Back row	11 January 1989 (age 37)	13	Kubota Spears Funabashi Tokyo Bay
Michael Leitch	Back row	7 October 1988 (age 37)	73	Toshiba Brave Lupus Tokyo
Faulua Makisi	Back row	20 January 1997 (age 29)	3	Kubota Spears Funabashi Tokyo Bay
Tevita Tatafu	Back row	2 January 1996 (age 30)	10	Tokyo Sungoliath
Daiki Nakajima	Scrum-half	25 March 1996 (age 30)	3	Kobelco Kobe Steelers
Naoto Saito	Scrum-half	26 August 1997 (age 28)	7	Tokyo Sungoliath
Kaito Shigeno	Scrum-half	21 November 1990 (age 35)	14	Toyota Verblitz
Hayata Nakao	Fly-half	20 January 1995 (age 31)	0	Toshiba Brave Lupus Tokyo
Takuya Yamasawa	Fly-half	21 September 1994 (age 31)	4	Saitama Wild Knights
Lee Seung-sin	Fly-half	13 January 2001 (age 25)	1	Kobelco Kobe Steelers
Yusuke Kajimura	Centre	13 September 1995 (age 30)	2	Yokohama Canon Eagles
Shogo Nakano	Centre	11 June 1997 (age 29)	3	Tokyo Sungoliath
Dylan Riley	Centre	2 May 1997 (age 29)	5	Saitama Wild Knights
Siosaia Fifita	Wing	20 December 1998 (age 27)	7	Hanazono Kintetsu Liners
Jone Naikabula	Wing	12 March 1994 (age 32)	0	Toshiba Brave Lupus Tokyo
Taichi Takahashi	Wing	24 May 1996 (age 30)	0	Toyota Verblitz
Gerhard van den Heever	Wing	13 April 1989 (age 37)	1	Kubota Spears Funabashi Tokyo Bay
Rakuhei Yamashita	Wing	30 January 1991 (age 35)	0	Kobelco Kobe Steelers
Ryuji Noguchi	Fullback	15 July 1995 (age 30)	14	Saitama Wild Knights
Ryohei Yamanaka	Fullback	22 June 1988 (age 38)	22	Kobelco Kobe Steelers

== Matches ==
=== First test ===
2 July 2022
15:00 JST (UTC+09)

Japan	23–42	France
Try: Tatafu 13' c Fifita 80+1' c Con: Shigeno (1/1) 14'; Lee Seung-sin (1/1) 80+2'; Pen: Shigeno (1/1) 14'; Lee Seung-sin (1/1) 26', 54'		Try: Penaud (2) 3' c, 58' c Lebel 43' c Moefana 61' m Bourgarit 69' c Con: Jaminet (4/5) 4', 45', 59', 70'; Pen: Jaminet (3/3) 18', 29', 54'

Toyota Stadium, Toyota
Referee: Frank Murphy (Ireland)

Team details

FB	15	Ryohei Yamanaka
RW	14	Gerhard van den Heever	(substituted off) 51'
OC	13	Dylan Riley
IC	12	Shogo Nakano	(substituted off) 63'
LW	11	Siosaia Fifita
FH	10	Takuya Yamasawa
SH	9	Kaito Shigeno	(substituted off) 51'
N8	8	Tevita Tatafu (c)	(substituted off) 51'
BF	7	Ben Gunter
OF	6	Michael Leitch
RL	5	Jack Cornelsen
LL	4	Wimpie van der Walt	(substituted off) 59'
TP	3	Asaeli Ai Valu	(substituted off) 70'
HK	2	Atsushi Sakate	(substituted off) 70'
LP	1	Keita Inagaki	(substituted off) 51'
Replacements:
HK	16	Daigo Hashimoto	(substituted on) 70'
PR	17	Yukio Morikawa	(substituted on) 51'
PR	18	Shinnosuke Kakinaga	(substituted on) 70'
LK	19	Warner Dearns	(substituted on) 59'
FL	20	Faulua Makisi	(substituted on) 51'
SH	21	Daiki Nakajima	(substituted on) 51'
FH	22	Lee Seung-sin	(substituted on) 63'
WG	23	Taichi Takahashi	(substituted on) 51'
Coach:
(New Zealand) Jamie Joseph

FB	15	Melvyn Jaminet
RW	14	Damian Penaud
OC	13	Virimi Vakatawa	(substituted off) 63'
IC	12	Yoram Moefana
LW	11	Matthis Lebel
FH	10	Matthieu Jalibert	(substituted off) 70'
SH	9	Maxime Lucu	(substituted off) 59'
N8	8	Yoan Tanga	(substituted off) 63'
OF	7	Dylan Cretin
BF	6	Charles Ollivon (c)
RL	5	Thomas Jolmès	(substituted off) 44'
LL	4	Thibaud Flament
TP	3	Demba Bamba	(substituted off) 47'
HK	2	Peato Mauvaka	(substituted off) 50' (substituted on) 73'
LP	1	Jean-Baptiste Gros	(substituted off) 47'
Replacements:
HK	16	Pierre Bourgarit	(substituted on) 50' (substituted off) 73'
PR	17	Dany Priso	(substituted on) 47'
PR	18	Sipili Falatea	(substituted on) 47'
LK	19	Thomas Lavault	(substituted on) 44'
FL	20	Selevasio Tolofua	(substituted on) 63'
FL	21	Sekou Macalou	(substituted on) 63'
SH	22	Baptiste Couilloud	(substituted on) 59'
FH	23	Antoine Hastoy	(substituted on) 70'
Coach:
(France) Fabien Galthié

Assistant referees:
Chris Busby (Ireland)
Shuhei Kubo (Japan) (Replaced Mike Adamson 2 days out from the game)
Television match official:
Ben Whitehouse (Wales)

Notes:

- Thomas Jolmès, Yoan Tanga and Thomas Lavault (France) made their international debuts.
- France winning-streak of 9 consecutive test matches is their best series since 1937.

=== Second test ===
9 July 2022
14:50 JST (UTC+09)

Japan	15–20	France
Try: Yamanaka (2) 12' m, 40' c Con: Lee Seung-sin (1/1) 40+1'; Pen: Lee Seung-sin (1/1) 19'		Try: Lebel 9' c Couilloud 71' c Con: Lucu (1/1) 10'; Jalibert (1/1) 72'; Pen: Lucu (1/1) 44'; Jalibert (1/1) 61'

National Stadium, Tokyo
Referee: Mike Adamson (Scotland)

Team details

FB	15	Ryohei Yamanaka
RW	14	Gerhard van den Heever
OC	13	Dylan Riley
IC	12	Shogo Nakano	(substituted off) 58'
LW	11	Siosaia Fifita
FH	10	Lee Seung-sin	(substituted off) 65'
SH	9	Naoto Saito	(substituted off) 65'
N8	8	Jack Cornelsen
BF	7	Ben Gunter
OF	6	Michael Leitch
RL	5	Sanaila Waqa	(substituted off) 57'
LL	4	Warner Dearns	(substituted off) 67'
TP	3	Asaeli Ai Valu	(substituted off) 61'
HK	2	Atsushi Sakate (c)	(substituted off) 58'
LP	1	Keita Inagaki
Replacements:
HK	16	Shota Horie	(substituted on) 58'
PR	17	Yukio Morikawa
PR	18	Yusuke Kizu	(substituted on) 61'
LK	19	Takayasu Tsuji	(substituted on) 67'
FL	20	Tevita Tatafu	(substituted on) 57'
SH	21	Kaito Shigeno	(substituted on) 65'
FH	22	Yu Tamura	(substituted on) 65'
CE	23	Shane Gates	(substituted on) 58'
Coach:
(New Zealand) Jamie Joseph

FB	15	Max Spring
RW	14	Damian Penaud	(substituted off) 64'
OC	13	Virimi Vakatawa
IC	12	Yoram Moefana
LW	11	Matthis Lebel
FH	10	Matthieu Jalibert
SH	9	Maxime Lucu	(substituted off) 50'
N8	8	Yoan Tanga
OF	7	Charles Ollivon (c)
BF	6	Dylan Cretin	(substituted off) 43'
RL	5	Thomas Jolmès	(substituted off) 43'
LL	4	Thibaud Flament
TP	3	Demba Bamba	(substituted off) 46'
HK	2	Peato Mauvaka	(substituted off) 43'
LP	1	Jean-Baptiste Gros	(substituted off) 46'
Replacements:
HK	16	Pierre Bourgarit	(substituted on) 43'
PR	17	Dany Priso	(substituted on) 46'
PR	18	Sipili Falatea	(substituted on) 46'
LK	19	Thomas Lavault	(substituted on) 43'
FL	20	Ibrahim Diallo	(substituted on) 43'
FL	21	Sekou Macalou	(substituted on) 64'
SH	22	Baptiste Couilloud	(substituted on) 50'
FH	23	Antoine Hastoy
Coach:
(France) Fabien Galthié

Assistant referees:
Frank Murphy (Ireland)
Chris Busby (Ireland)
Television match official:
Ben Whitehouse (Wales)

Notes:

- Max Spring (France) made his international debut.
- France equals his record winning streak of 10 consecutive international test matches.

== Climatic conditions ==
The hot weather had been a major concern. At kick off of the first match, it recorded 34.5°C in Toyota. 24 hours before the first match, Toyota city recorded a historic high 39.8°C. As a result, three water breaks were put in place during each half of the match. Just after kick off of the second match, it recorded 31.5°C in Tokyo. Water breaks were also in place.

== Condolences to Shinzo Abe ==
Before the second match, the 57,000 crowd observed a minute's silence for the assassination of Shinzo Abe. After the match, French captain Charles Ollivon offered a French jersey with the name "Abe Shinzo" printed. Abe was a keen supporter of Japanese rugby. He visited the Japan dressing room during the 2019 Rugby World Cup and invited the team to the prime minister's office.

== See also ==
- 2022 mid-year rugby union tests
