= Tom Spring (rugby union) =

French rugby union player

- Born: 26 September 2002 (age 24) Saint-Palais, France
- Height: 186 cm (6 ft 1 in)
- Weight: 87 kg (192 lb; 13 st 10 lb)
- Notable relative: Max Spring (brother)

Rugby union career
- Position: Wing / Fullback
- Current team: Bayonne
Senior career
Years	Team	Apps	(Points)
2022–	Bayonne	62	(87)
- Correct as of 14 December 2025
International career
Years	Team	Apps	(Points)
2025–	France	1	(0)
- Correct as of 14 December 2025

Tom Spring (born 26 September 2002) is a French rugby union player, who plays for Bayonne. His preferred position is wing or fullback.

== Early career ==
Spring is from Saint-Palais and is the son of a New Zealand rugby union player who settled in France, and a Basque mother. He is one of three rugby playing brothers, with his brother Max playing for Racing 92 and France. He originally began playing rugby for Nafarroa aged eight. He joined the Bayonne academy in 2020.

== Professional career ==
Spring made his professional debut for Bayonne in the 2022–23 Top 14 season against Toulon. He made his first start the following April against La Rochelle. Spring had a break out season in 2024/25 as Bayonne qualified for the playoffs for the first time in 33 years.

Spring was called into the France for the 2025 mid-year rugby union tests. He made his debut for the side against New Zealand in the opening test of the 2025 France rugby union tour of New Zealand.
