= 2021–22 European Rugby Champions Cup =

Rugby Union club competition

Tournament details
- Countries: England; France; Ireland; Scotland; Wales
- Tournament format(s): Round-robin and knockout
- Date: 10 December 2021 – 28 May 2022

Tournament statistics
- Teams: 24
- Matches played: 60
- Attendance: 843,371 (14,056 per match)
- Highest attendance: 42,067 - Leinster v Toulouse; 14 May 2022
- Lowest attendance: 4,000 - Sale Sharks v Ospreys; 23 January 2022 (Note: When crowds were in attendance)
- Tries scored: 396 (6.6 per match)
- Top point scorer(s): (Ireland) Johnny Sexton (Leinster); 65 points
- Top try scorer(s): (Ireland) James Lowe (Leinster); 10 tries

Final
- Venue: Stade Vélodrome, Marseille
- Champions: (France) La Rochelle (1st title)
- Runners-up: (Ireland) Leinster

The 2021–22 European Rugby Champions Cup (known as the Heineken Champions Cup for sponsorship reasons) was the eighth season of the European Rugby Champions Cup, the annual club rugby union competition run by European Professional Club Rugby (EPCR) for teams from the top six nations in European rugby. It was the 27th season of pan-European professional club rugby competition.

Due to the COVID-19 pandemic, the 24-team, two pool tournament format adopted for the previous season remained.

This is the final year, under the current sponsorship deal, with Dutch beer brand Heineken, after a four-year deal was agreed starting from the 2018/19 season.

The tournament commenced in December 2021. On 28 May 2022, Stade Rochelais won the final at Stade Vélodrome in Marseille, France, defeating Leinster 24 points to 21.

== Teams ==
Twenty-four clubs from the three major European domestic and regional leagues are competing in the Champions Cup.

The distribution of the teams are:

- England: eight clubs
  - The top eight clubs from Premiership Rugby
- France: eight clubs
  - The top seven clubs from the Top 14
  - Montpellier automatically qualify as Challenge Cup champions despite not finishing in the top 8.
- Ireland, Italy, Scotland, Wales: eight clubs
  - The top four sides in each conference from the previous season's Pro14 (now known as United Rugby Championship).

The following teams have qualified for the tournament as of 12 June 2021.

Premiership	Top 14	United Rugby Championship (Pro14)		
England	France	Ireland	Scotland	Wales
Bath; Bristol Bears; Exeter Chiefs; Harlequins; Leicester Tigers; Northampton Saints; Sale Sharks; Wasps	Bordeaux Bègles; Castres; Clermont; La Rochelle; Montpellier; Racing 92; Stade Français; Toulouse	Connacht; Leinster; Munster; Ulster	Glasgow Warriors	Cardiff; Ospreys; Scarlets

=== Team details ===
Below is the list of coaches, captain and stadiums with their method of qualification for each team.

Note: Placing shown in brackets, denotes standing at the end of the regular season for their respective leagues, with their end of season positioning shown through CH for Champions, RU for Runner-up, SF for losing Semi-finalist, and QF for losing Quarter-finalist.

Team	Coach / Director of Rugby	Captain	Stadium	Capacity	Method of qualification
(England) Bath	(England) Stuart Hooper	(England) Charlie Ewels	The Recreation Ground	14,509	Premiership top 8 (7th)
(France) Bordeaux Bègles	(France) Christophe Urios	(France) Jefferson Poirot	Stade Chaban-Delmas	34,694	Top 14 top 8 (4th)
(England) Bristol Bears	(Samoa) Pat Lam	(New Zealand) Steve Luatua	Ashton Gate	27,000	Premiership top 8 (3rd) (SF)
(Wales) Cardiff Rugby	(Wales) Dai Young	(Wales) Josh Turnbull	Cardiff Arms Park	12,125	Pro14 Conference B (4th)
(France) Castres	(Argentina) Mauricio Reggiardo	(France) Mathieu Babillot	Stade Pierre-Fabre	12,500	Top 14 top 8 (6th) (QF)
(France) Clermont	(New Zealand) Jono Gibbes	(France) Camille Lopez	Stade Marcel-Michelin	19,022	Top 14 top 8 (5th) (QF)
(Ireland) Connacht	(Australia) Andy Friend	(Ireland) Jack Carty	Galway Sportsgrounds	8,129	Pro14 Conference B (2nd)
(England) Exeter Chiefs	(England) Rob Baxter	(England) Jack Yeandle (England) Joe Simmonds	Sandy Park	13,593	Premiership top 8 (2nd) (RU)
(Scotland) Glasgow Warriors	(England) Danny Wilson	(Scotland) Fraser Brown (Scotland) Ryan Wilson	Scotstoun Stadium	7,351	Pro14 Conference A (4th)
(England) Harlequins	(Australia) Billy Millard	(South Africa) Stephan Lewies	Twickenham Stoop	14,800	Premiership top 8 (1st) (CH)
(France) La Rochelle	(Ireland) Ronan O'Gara	(France) Grégory Alldritt	Stade Marcel-Deflandre	16,000	Top 14 top 8 (2nd) (RU)
(England) Leicester Tigers	(England) Steve Borthwick	(England) Ellis Genge	Mattioli Woods Welford Road	25,849	Premiership top 8 (6th)
(Ireland) Leinster	(Ireland) Leo Cullen	(Ireland) Johnny Sexton	RDS Arena; Aviva Stadium	18,500; 51,700	Pro14 Conference A (1st) (CH)
(France) Montpellier	(France) Philippe Saint-André	(France) Fulgence Ouedraogo	Altrad Stadium	15,697	2020–21 Challenge Cup Champion
(Ireland) Munster	(South Africa) Johann van Graan	(Ireland) Peter O'Mahony	Thomond Park	25,600	Pro14 Conference B (1st) (RU)
(England) Northampton Saints	(New Zealand) Chris Boyd	(England) Lewis Ludlam	Franklin's Gardens	15,200	Premiership top 8 (5th)
(Wales) Ospreys	(England) Toby Booth	(Wales) Justin Tipuric	Swansea.com Stadium	21,088	Pro14 Conference A (3rd)
(France) Racing 92	(France) Laurent Travers	(France) Henry Chavancy	Paris La Défense Arena	30,681	Top 14 top 8 (3rd)
(England) Sale Sharks	(England) Alex Sanderson	(South Africa) Jono Ross	AJ Bell Stadium	12,000	Premiership top 8 (3rd) (SF)
(Wales) Scarlets	(Wales) Dwayne Peel	(Wales) Jonathan Davies	Parc y Scarlets	14,870	Pro14 Conference B (3rd)
(France) Stade Français	(Argentina) Gonzalo Quesada	(France) Yoann Maestri	Stade Jean-Bouin	20,000	Top 14 top 8 (6th) (QF)
(France) Toulouse	(France) Ugo Mola	(France) Julien Marchand	Stade Ernest-Wallon	19,500	Top 14 top 8 (1st) (CH)
(Ireland) Ulster	(England) Dan McFarland	(Ireland) Iain Henderson	Ravenhill Stadium	18,196	Pro14 Conference A (2nd)
(England) Wasps	(England) Lee Blackett	(England) Joe Launchbury	Ricoh Arena	32,609	Premiership top 8 (8th)

== Seeding and draw ==
The twenty four teams are seeded based on their finishing position in end of season playoffs and league positions. This follows the format from the previous season with the number 1 and number 2 ranked clubs from each league in Tier 1, the number 3 and number 4 ranked clubs in Tier 2, the number 5 and 6 ranked clubs in Tier 3, and the number 7 and number 8 ranked clubs in Tier 4.

Tier	Rank	Top 14	Premiership	United Rugby Championship (Pro14)
1	1	(France) Toulouse	(England) Harlequins	(Ireland) Leinster
1	2	(France) La Rochelle	(England) Exeter Chiefs	(Ireland) Munster
2	3	(France) Racing 92	(England) Bristol Bears	(Ireland) Ulster
2	4	(France) Bordeaux Bègles	(England) Sale Sharks	(Ireland) Connacht
3	5	(France) Clermont	(England) Northampton Saints	(Wales) Scarlets
3	6	(France) Stade Français	(England) Leicester Tigers	(Wales) Ospreys
4	7	(France) Castres	(England) Bath	(Wales) Cardiff
4	8	(France) Montpellier	(England) Wasps	(Scotland) Glasgow Warriors

The draw took place on 21 July 2021 in Lausanne, Switzerland.

== Pool Stage ==
Teams are awarded four points for a win, two for a draw, one for scoring four tries in a game, and one for losing by less than eight points.

Key to colours
Top 8 in each pool, advance to round of 16.
Teams ranked 9th–11th in each pool advance to 2021–22 EPCR Challenge Cup round of 16

=== Pool A ===
Pool A Standings
Team	P	W	D	L	PF	PA	Diff	TF	TA	TB	LB	Pts
(France) Racing 92	4	4	0	0	126	24	+102	16	3	3	0	19
(Ireland) Ulster	4	4	0	0	114	96	+18	15	9	3	0	19
(France) La Rochelle	4	3	1	0	97	64	+33	11	7	2	0	16
(Ireland) Leinster	4	3	0	1	198	62	+136	30	8	3	0	15
(England) Sale Sharks	4	2	1	1	89	48	+41	13	5	1	1	12
(England) Exeter Chiefs	4	2	0	2	127	82	+45	19	7	3	0	11
(France) Montpellier	4	2	0	2	78	157	–79	9	23	2	0	10
(France) Clermont	4	1	1	2	79	82	–3	8	10	0	2	8
(Scotland) Glasgow Warriors	4	1	0	3	82	117	–35	7	15	0	1	5
(England) Northampton Saints	4	0	0	4	56	124	–68	6	17	0	2	2
(England) Bath	4	0	1	3	48	148	–100	6	22	0	0	2
(Wales) Ospreys	4	0	0	4	33	123	–90	3	17	0	0	0

=== Pool B ===
Pool B Standings
Team	P	W	D	L	PF	PA	Diff	TF	TA	TB	LB	Pts
(England) Leicester Tigers	4	4	0	0	102	64	+38	14	7	3	0	19
(England) Harlequins	4	4	0	0	135	101	+34	18	15	3	0	19
(Ireland) Munster	4	4	0	0	115	47	+68	12	5	2	0	18
(England) Bristol Bears	4	3	1	0	108	38	+70	16	4	3	0	17
(Ireland) Connacht	4	1	0	3	118	104	+14	16	14	3	3	10
(France) Bordeaux	4	1	1	2	58	54	+4	8	7	1	1	8
(France) Toulouse	4	1	1	2	61	65	–4	8	8	1	0	7
(France) Stade Français	4	1	1	2	63	95	–32	7	14	1	0	7
(Wales) Cardiff	4	1	0	3	85	118	–33	13	16	2	1	7
(England) Wasps	4	1	1	2	51	102	–51	6	13	0	0	6
(France) Castres	4	0	0	4	77	91	–14	9	9	1	4	5
(Wales) Scarlets	4	0	1	3	31	125	–94	4	19	0	0	2

== Knockout stage ==
The knockout stage began across the 8/9/10 April with a home and away round of 16 matches consisting of the top eight ranked teams from each pool.

=== Bracket ===
Round of 16
A1	(France) Racing 92	22	33	55
B8	(France) Stade Français	9	22	31
B4	(England) Bristol Bears	10	29	39
A5	(England) Sale Sharks	9	35	44
A3	(France) La Rochelle	31	31	62
B6	(France) Bordeaux	13	23	36
B2	(England) Harlequins	26	33	59
A7	(France) Montpellier	40	20	60
B1	(England) Leicester Tigers	29	27	56
A8	(France) Clermont	10	17	27
A4	(Ireland) Leinster	26	56	82
B5	(Ireland) Connacht	21	20	41
B3	(Ireland) Munster	8	26	34
A6	(England) Exeter Chiefs	13	10	23
A2	(Ireland) Ulster	26	23	49
B7	(France) Toulouse	20	30	50

Quarterfinals
A1	(France) Racing 92	41
A5	(England) Sale Sharks	22
A3	(France) La Rochelle	31
A7	(France) Montpellier	19
B1	(England) Leicester Tigers	14
A4	(Ireland) Leinster	23
B3	(Ireland) Munster	24 (2)
B7	(France) Toulouse (p)	24 (4)

Semifinals
A1	(France) Racing 92	13
A3	(France) La Rochelle	20
A4	(Ireland) Leinster	40
B7	(France) Toulouse	17

Finals
(France) La Rochelle	24
(Ireland) Leinster	21

=== Round of 16 ===
==== First leg ====
8 April 2022
20:00 IST

Connacht (Ireland)	21–26	(Ireland) Leinster
Try: Porch 2' m Fifita 60' c Con: Carty (1/2) 61'; Pen: Carty (3/3) 33', 40'+4, 45'	Report	Try: Lowe (2) 22' c, 26' m Keenan 52' m Con: Sexton (1/3) 23'; Pen: Sexton (2/2) 18', 37'; Byrne (1/1) 76'

Galway Sportsgrounds
Attendance: 8,126
Referee: Karl Dickson (England)

9 April 2022
13:00 BST

Sale Sharks (England)	9–10	(England) Bristol Bears
Pen: du Preez (3/4) 4', 9', 77'	Report	Try: Radradra 71' c Con: Sheedy (1/1) 72'; Pen: Sheedy (1/1) 25'

AJ Bell Stadium
Attendance: 4,672
Referee: Mathieu Raynal (France)

9 April 2022
14:00 CET

Bordeaux (France)	13–31	(France) La Rochelle
Try: Woki 50' m Mori 67' m Pen: Lucu (1/1) 9'	Report	Try: Rhule 21' c Danty 53' m Penalty try 63'; Con: West (1/2) 22'; Pen: West (4/4) 9', 38' 48', 71'

Stade Chaban-Delmas
Attendance: 30,000
Referee: Matthew Carley (England)

9 April 2022
16:15 CET

Toulouse (France)	20–26	(Ireland) Ulster
Try: Meafou 6' c Ntamack 79' c Con: Ramos (2/2) 7', 79'; Pen: Ramos (1/2) 40'	Report	Try: Baloucoune (3) 12' c, 44' m, 66' c Warwick 58' c Con: Cooney (3/4) 13', 59', 66'

Le Stadium
Attendance: 28,000
Referee: Wayne Barnes (England)

9 April 2022
17:30 BST

Exeter Chiefs (England)	13–8	(Ireland) Munster
Try: Hogg 5' m Vermeulen 37' m Drop: Hogg (1/1) 65'	Report	Try: S. Daly 66' m Pen: Healy (1/1) 56'

Sandy Park
Attendance: 10,307
Referee: Pierre Brousset (France)

9 April 2022
18:30 CET

Stade Français (France)	9–22	(France) Racing 92
Pen: Segonds (2/2) 37', 40+2'; Sánchez (1/2) 70'	Report	Try: Fickou 60' c Con: Le Garrec (1/1) 60'; Pen: Le Garrec (5/6) 14', 20', 23', 30', 76'

Stade Jean-Bouin
Attendance: 12,500
Referee: Luke Pearce (England)

10 April 2022
14:00 CET

Montpellier (France)	40–26	(England) Harlequins
Try: N'Gandebe 21' c Mercer (2) 31' c, 38' c Reinach 34' m Lamositele 41' m Con: Garbisi (3/5) 22', 32', 39'; Pen: Garbisi (1/2) 47'; Pollard (2/2) 74', 80'	Report	Try: Hammond 40' m Esterhuizen 61' c Marchant 65' c Lynagh 78' c Con: Smith (3/4) 62', 66', 79'

Altrad Stadium
Attendance: 7,500
Referee: Andrew Brace (Ireland)

10 April 2022
16:15 CET

Clermont (France)	10–29	(England) Leicester Tigers
Try: Tiberghien 12' c Con: Parra (1/1) 14'; Pen: Parra (1/1) 27'	Report	Try: Genge 18' m Montoya 32' m Van Poortvliet 45' m Saumaki 52' c Potter 64' c Con: Ford (2/5) 53', 65'

Stade Marcel-Michelin
Attendance: 15,328
Referee: Nika Amashukeli (Georgia)

==== Second leg ====
15 April 2022
17:30 IST

Leinster (Ireland)	56–20	(Ireland) Connacht
Try: Gibson-Park 10' c Henshaw (2) 17' c, 41' c Furlong 27' c Lowe (4) 35' c, 54' c, 64' c, 80' c Con: Sexton (6/6) 11', 17', 28', 35', 42', 56'; R. Byrne (2/2) 66', 80'	Report	Try: O'Halloran 45' m Arnold 61' m Papali'i 69' c Con: Carty (1/3) 70'; Pen: Carty (1/2) 1'

Aviva Stadium
Attendance: 32,604
Referee: Luke Pearce (England)

15 April 2022
20:00 BST

Bristol Bears (England)	29–35	(England) Sale Sharks
Try: Thacker 48' c Morahan (2) 53' c, 77' m Joyce 62' c Con: Sheedy (3/4) 49', 53', 63'; Pen: Sheedy (1/2) 20'	Report	Try: de Jager 31' c Van der Merwe 40' c Roebuck 41' c Ross 74' m Con: R. du Preez (3/4) 31', 40+1', 41'; Pen: R. du Preez (3/3) 23', 65', 72'

Ashton Gate
Attendance: 13,840
Referee: Frank Murphy (Ireland)

16 April 2022
12:30 BST

Harlequins (England)	33–20	(France) Montpellier
Try: Jones 1' c Dombrandt 14' c Marchant 29' c Lynagh (2) 38' c, 75' m Con: Smith (4/5) 2', 16', 30', 39'	Report	Try: Reilhac 11' c Tisseron 33' c Con: Foursans-Bourdette (2/2) 12', 34'; Pen: Foursans-Bourdette (1/1) 27'; Pollard (1/2) 55'

Twickenham Stoop
Attendance: 14,800
Referee: Mike Adamson (Scotland)

16 April 2022
15:00 IST

Munster (Ireland)	26–10	(England) Exeter Chiefs
Try: Carbery 25' c de Allende 72' c Con: Carbery (2/2) 26', 72'; Pen: Carbery (4/4) 5', 16', 59', 64'	Report	Try: S. Maunder 10' m Vermeulen 48' m

Thomond Park
Attendance: 21,125
Referee: Mathieu Raynal (France)

16 April 2022
16:00 CET

La Rochelle (France)	31–23	(France) Bordeaux
Try: West 41' c Alldritt 47' c Kerr-Barlow 54' c Botia 68' c Con: West (4/4) 42', 48', 55', 68'; Pen: West (1/2) 20'	Report	Try: Massé 52' c Mori 76' c Con: Lucu (1/1) 52'; Garcia (1/1) 77'; Pen: Lucu (2/3) 15', 37'; Garcia (1/1) 64'

Stade Marcel-Deflandre
Attendance: 16,000
Referee: Wayne Barnes (England)

16 April 2022
17:30 BST

Leicester Tigers (England)	27–17	(France) Clermont
Try: Liebenberg 8' c Scott 49' m Penalty try 61'; Steward 65' m Con: Ford (1/2) 9'; Pen: Ford (1/1) 45'	Report	Try: Raka 57' c Lee 68' c Con: Parra (2/2) 58', 69'; Pen: Lopez (1/1) 16'

Mattioli Woods Welford Road
Attendance: 22,722
Referee: Andrew Brace (Ireland)

16 April 2022
20:00 IST

Ulster (Ireland)	23–30	(France) Toulouse
Try: McIlroy (2) 10' c, 37' c Con: Cooney (2/2) 11', 39'; Pen: Cooney (3/3) 18', 52', 68'	Report	Try: Ramos 21' c Ntamack 26' c Dupont 74' c Con: Ramos (3/3) 22', 27', 75'; Pen: Ramos (3/3) 1', 13', 63'

Ravenhill Stadium
Attendance: 18,196
Referee: Matthew Carley (England)

17 April 2022
16:30 CET

Racing 92 (France)	33–22	(France) Stade Français
Try: Penalty try 34'; Thomas (2) 43' c, 78' m Lauret 72' m Con: Le Garrec (1/3) 44'; Pen: Le Garrec (3/3) 19', 30', 55'	Report	Try: Veainu 5' c Lapegue (2) 21' m, 37' c Con: Sánchez (2/3) 5', 38'; Pen: Sánchez (1/1) 13'

Paris La Défense Arena
Attendance: 15,000
Referee: Nika Amashukeli (Georgia)

=== Quarter-finals ===
7 May 2022
15:00 IST

Munster (Ireland)	24–24 (a.e.t.)	(France) Toulouse
Try: Kendellen 9' c Earls 38' c Haley 43' c Con: Carbery (3/3) 9', 39', 44'; Pen: Carbery (1/3) 56'	Report	Try: Ntamack 11' c Lebel (2) 25' c, 66' c Con: Ramos (3/3) 12', 26', 66'; Pen: Ramos (1/1) 75'
	Penalties
Murray; Healy; Carbery; Murray; Healy	2–4	Dupont; Ramos; Ntamack; Dupont

Aviva Stadium
Attendance: 40,479
Referee: Luke Pearce (England)

7 May 2022
18:30 CEST

La Rochelle (France)	31–19	(France) Montpellier
Try: Priso 12' c Vito 22' c Botia 47' m Con: West (2/3) 13', 23'; Pen: West (4/4) 17', 64', 69', 78'	Report	Try: Thomas 28' c Reilhac 41' c Mercer 53' m Con: Foursans-Bourdette (2/3) 30', 42'

Stade Marcel-Deflandre
Attendance: 16,000
Referee: Karl Dickson (England)

7 May 2022
17:30 BST

Leicester Tigers (England)	14–23	(Ireland) Leinster
Try: Ashton 45' c Dolly 78' c Con: Ford (2/2) 46', 78'	Report	Try: Van der Flier 14' c Henshaw 19' c Con: Sexton (2/2) 16', 20'; Pen: Sexton (2/2) 3', 36'; Byrne (1/1) 65'

Mattioli Woods Welford Road
Attendance: 19,066
Referee: Mathieu Raynal (France)

8 May 2022
16:00 CEST

Racing 92 (France)	41–22	(England) Sale Sharks
Try: Thomas 41' c Russell 49' c Imhoff 68' m Spring 79' c Con: Le Garrec (2/3) 42', 50'; Machenaud (1/1) 80'; Pen: Le Garrec (5/6) 11', 14', 47', 62', 67'	Report	Try: Tuilagi 40' c Van der Merwe 54' c B. Curry 73' m Con: R. du Preez (2/3) 40+1', 55'; Pen: R. du Preez (1/2) 22'

Paris La Défense Arena
Attendance: 9,356
Referee: Andrew Brace (Ireland)

=== Semi-finals ===
14 May 2022
15:00 IST

Leinster (Ireland)	40–17	(France) Toulouse
Try: Lowe (2) 14' c, 49' c Van der Flier 19' c Keenan 78' c Con: Sexton (3/3) 16', 20', 51'; Byrne (1/1) 79'; Pen: Sexton (3/3) 4', 12', 33'; Byrne (1/1) 73'	Report	Try: Dupont 6' c Tolofua 65' c Con: Ramos (2/2) 7', 65'; Pen: Ramos (1/1) 24'

Aviva Stadium
Attendance: 42,067
Referee: Karl Dickson (England)

15 May 2022
16:00 CEST

Racing 92 (France)	13–20	(France) La Rochelle
Try: Vakatawa 25' c Con: Le Garrec (1/1) 27'; Pen: Le Garrec (2/3) 2', 50'	Report	Try: Alldritt 40+2' m Penalty try 52'; West 80' m Pen: West (1/3) 32'

Stade Bollaert-Delelis
Attendance: 15,522
Referee: Matthew Carley (England)

=== Final ===
28 May 2022
17:45

La Rochelle (France)	24–21	(Ireland) Leinster
Try: Rhule 9' c Bourgarit 60' c Retière 79' c Con: West (3/3) 11', 61', 80'; Pen: West (1/1) 41'	Report	Pen: Sexton (6/6) 4', 8', 22', 40+2', 47', 53'; R. Byrne (1/1) 64'

Stade Vélodrome, Marseille
Attendance: 59,682
Referee: Wayne Barnes (England)

== See also ==
- 2021–22 EPCR Challenge Cup
