= Paul Costes =

French rugby union player (born 2003)

- Full name: Paul Costes
- Born: 4 April 2003 (age 23) Toulouse, France
- Height: 1.82 m (6 ft 0 in)
- Weight: 85 kg (187 lb; 13 st 5 lb)

Rugby union career
- Position: Centre
- Current team: Toulouse
Youth career
- 2010–2015: Toulouse Université Club
- 2015–2018: Colomiers
- 2018–2022: Toulouse
Senior career
Years	Team	Apps	(Points)
2022–	Toulouse	27	(15)
- Correct as of 28 June 2024
International career
Years	Team	Apps	(Points)
2023	France U20	8	(5)
- Correct as of 15 April 2024

Paul Costes (born 4 April 2003) is a French professional rugby union player who plays as a centre for Top 14 club Toulouse.

== Early life ==
Paul Costes was born in Toulouse. He is the son of Arnaud Costes, a former French international rugby union player. He started rugby as a child at the TUC, then joined Colomiers as a junior, before going to Stade Toulousain a few years later, as a second-year cadet.

== Professional career ==
=== Toulouse ===
Costes made his professional debut on 29 October 2022, during the ninth day of the 2022–23 Top 14 season against Bayonne, when he replaced Arthur Bonneval in the 60th minute of play. The following week, he scored the first try of his career allowing his team to obtain a 16–16 draw against Stade Français.

== Honours ==
Toulouse

- 1× European Rugby Champions Cup: 2024
- 2× Top 14: 2023, 2024
