= Rémi Picquette =

French rugby union player

- Born: Rémi Picquette; 23 February 1995 (age 31) La Chapelle-d'Armentières, France
- Height: 2.00 m (6 ft 6 1/2 in)
- Weight: 117 kg (18 st 6 lb; 258 lb)

Rugby union career
- Position: Lock
- Current team: La Rochelle
Youth career
- 2011–2012: Tourcoing
- 2012–2014: Lille Métropole
- 2014–2015: La Rochelle
Senior career
Years	Team	Apps	(Points)
2015–2017	La Rochelle	1	(0)
2017–2021	Vannes	68	(10)
2021–	La Rochelle	18	(20)
- Correct as of 21 June 2022

Rémi Picquette (born 23 February 1995) is a French rugby union player. He currently plays as a lock for La Rochelle in the Top 14.

Coming from the outskirts of Lille, Nord, he joined La Rochelle in 2014 before moving to Vannes in 2017. He returned to La Rochelle in 2021 and won the European Rugby Champions Cup in 2022.

== Career ==
Rémi Picquette was called by Fabien Galthié to the French national team for the first time in June 2022, for the summer tour of Japan.

== Honours ==
=== La Rochelle ===
- European Rugby Champions Cup: 2021–22
