= Arthur Retière =

France international rugby union player (born 1997)

- Born: 1 August 1997 (age 29) Dijon, France
- Height: 1.70 m (5 ft 7 in)
- Weight: 80 kg (12 st 8 lb)

Rugby union career
- Position(s): Winger; Full-back; Scrum-half
- Current team: Bordeaux Bègles
Amateur team(s)
Years	Team	Apps	(Points)
2002–2015	CS Nuiton		
Senior career
Years	Team	Apps	(Points)
2015–2016	Racing 92	2	(0)
2016–2022	La Rochelle	115	(224)
2022–2024	Toulouse	46	(45)
2024-	Bordeaux Bègles	47	(40)
- Correct as of 14 September 2024
International career
Years	Team	Apps	(Points)
2017	France U20	7	(10)
2020–	France	1	(0)
- Correct as of 31 Oct 2020
National sevens team
Years	Team		Comps
2016	France 7s		20

Arthur Retière (born 1 August 1997) is a French rugby union winger or full-back and he currently plays for Bordeaux Bègles

== Honours ==
=== Club ===
La Rochelle

- 1x European Rugby Champions Cup: 2022

Toulouse

- 1x European Rugby Champions Cup: 2024
- 1x Top 14: 2023

Bordeaux Bègles

- 2× European Rugby Champions Cup: 2025, 2026
