= Enzo Reybier =

France international rugby union player

- Born: 4 April 2002 (age 24) Saint-Lupicin, France
- Height: 1.75 m (5 ft 9 in)
- Weight: 77 kg (170 lb; 12 st 2 lb)

Rugby union career
- Position: Wing
- Current team: Bordeaux Bègles
Senior career
Years	Team	Apps	(Points)
2020–2024	Oyonnax	39	(55)
2024–	Bordeaux Bègles	7	(10)
- Correct as of 27 May 2025
International career
Years	Team	Apps	(Points)
2021–2022	France U20	8	(25)
- Correct as of 22 June 2022

Enzo Reybier (born 4 April 2002) is a French professional rugby union player who plays as a wing for Top 14 club Bordeaux Bègles.

== Club career ==
Born in Saint-Lupicin, Enzo Reybier first played judo, before switching to rugby union. He started his rugby career in the club of Saint-Claude, the town in Jura where he grew up, before joining the US Oyonnax in 2015.

Having first studied in Villefranche-sur-Saône as a teenager, the Jurassian later joined the Lycée Arbez-Carme and the pôle espoirs of Oyonnax. He made his debut with the club from the Ain department on 18 September 2020 replacing Adrian Sanday during a Pro D2 away win against Soyaux-Angoulême, becoming the first 2002-born man to play in the French second tier, and the youngest player to ever play with the USO.

Starting several games in the early following season, he signed an espoirs contract with the club in September 2021, until 2023. But Reybier had to wait until early spring to really become a key member of his team, scoring a brace of tries during the derby against Bourg-en-Bresse in April 2022, following an outstanding Six Nations Under 20s. He was a starter during the unsuccessful Top 14 play-offs at the end of the season.

== International career ==
Having soon been included in France youth selections, Enzo Reybier was part of the Pôle France in 2020, before being selected with the under-20 for the delayed Six Nations in June 2021. During the tournament, he scored tries against Wales and Scotland. He really stood out during the following tournament in 2022, scoring 3 tries as France finished second in the Six Nations, only narrowly losing against the Irish grand slam winners.

Reybier was first called by Fabien Galthié to the French senior team for the first time in June 2022, for the summer tour of Japan.

== Playing style ==
First playing as centre through the youth teams, Reybier successfully moved to the wing as he made his first steps toward professional rugby. He has been described as an explosive winger, elusive in attack but also with outstanding defensive abilities.

Naming players like Jonny Wilkinson and Benjamín Urdapilleta as sources of inspiration in 2020, he has been compared to Italy international and fellow Rhône-Alpes-born player Ange Capuozzo.
