= Thomas Laclayat =

French rugby union player (born 1997)

- Born: 2 October 1997 (age 29) Pont-de-Vaux, France
- Height: 1.76 m (5 ft 9 in)
- Weight: 125 kg (276 lb; 19 st 10 lb)

Rugby union career
- Position: Prop
- Current team: Pau
Senior career
Years	Team	Apps	(Points)
2017–2023	Oyonnax	119	(100)
2023–2025	Racing 92	42	(5)
2025–	Pau	5	(0)
- Correct as of 15 October 2025
International career
Years	Team	Apps	(Points)
2017	France U20	5	(0)
2023–	France	3	(0)
- Correct as of 22 November 2025

Thomas Laclayat (born 2 October 1997) is a French professional rugby union player who plays as a prop for Top 14 club Pau.

== Professional career ==
After a Barbarian F.C. invitation, Thomas Laclayat was called by Fabien Galthié to the French national team for the first time in June 2022, for the summer tour of Japan.
