= 2023–24 European Rugby Champions Cup =

Rugby union competition

Tournament details
- Countries: England; France; Ireland; Scotland; South Africa; Wales
- Tournament format(s): Modified round-robin and knockout
- Date: 8 December 2023 – 25 May 2024

Tournament statistics
- Matches played: 63
- Attendance: 1,160,390 (18,419 per match)
- Highest attendance: 82,300 – Leinster v Northampton Saints; 4 May 2024
- Lowest attendance: 6,024 – Connacht v Bordeaux; 8 December 2023
- Tries scored: 468 (7.43 per match)
- Top point scorer(s): (England) Marcus Smith (Harlequins); 85 points
- Top try scorer(s): (Ireland) James Lowe (Leinster) (France) Louis Bielle-Biarrey (Bordeaux) (France) Matthis Lebel (Toulouse); 6 tries

Final
- Venue: Tottenham Hotspur Stadium, London
- Attendance: 61,531
- Champions: (France) Toulouse (6th title)
- Runners-up: (Ireland) Leinster

The 2023–24 European Rugby Champions Cup is the tenth season of the European Rugby Champions Cup, the annual club rugby union competition run by European Professional Club Rugby (EPCR) for teams from the top five nations in European rugby and South Africa. It was the 29th season of pan-European professional club rugby competition.

This was the second time the tournament features the top teams from South Africa, following the second United Rugby Championship season.

The tournament commenced in May 2024. The final was held at Tottenham Hotspur Stadium in Tottenham, England on 25 May 2024, and won by Toulouse for the sixth time, defeating Leinster 31–22.

== Teams ==
Twenty-four clubs from the three major European domestic and regional leagues qualified to compete in the 2023–24 edition of the Champions Cup.

The distribution of teams is:

- England: eight clubs
  - The top eight clubs from Premiership Rugby (Note: London Irish originally qualified as one of the top 8 Premiership teams, after finishing 5th in the 2022–23 season. However, the club was officially suspended from all professional competitions on 6 June 2023, due to financial insolvency. As a consequence, their spot in the Champions Cup was awarded to Bristol Bears, the highest ranked team outside the top 8.)
- France: eight clubs
  - The top eight clubs from the Top 14
- Ireland, Italy, Scotland, South Africa, Wales: eight clubs
  - The top side in each of the four regional shields from the United Rugby Championship (one Irish, one Welsh, one South African and one either Scottish or Italian), along with the remaining top four ranked clubs regardless of nation, within the league, that didn't win their respective shield. If the club that wins the championship has not qualified by the methods above then that club, the four shield winners and the remaining top three ranked clubs regardless of nation, within the league, that didn't win their respective shield will qualify.

Premiership	Top 14	United Rugby Championship			
England	France	Ireland	South Africa	Scotland	Wales
Bath; Bristol Bears; Exeter Chiefs; Harlequins; Leicester Tigers; Northampton Saints; Sale Sharks; Saracens	Bayonne; Bordeaux; La Rochelle; Lyon; Racing 92; Stade Français; Toulon; Toulouse	Connacht; Leinster; Munster; Ulster	Bulls; Stormers	Glasgow Warriors	Cardiff

=== Team details ===
Below is the list of coaches, captain and stadiums with their method of qualification for each team.

Note: Placing shown in brackets, denotes standing at the end of the regular season for their respective leagues, with their end of season positioning shown through CH for Champions, RU for Runner-up, SF for losing Semi-finalist, and QF for losing Quarter-finalist.

Team	Coach(es) / Director of Rugby	Captain	Stadium	Capacity	Method of qualification
(France) Bayonne	(France) Grégory Patat	(France) Denis Marchois	Stade Jean-Dauger	14,370	Top 14 top 8 (8th)
(England) Bath	(South Africa) Johann van Graan	(England) Ben Spencer	Recreation Ground	14,509	Premiership top 8 (8th)
(France) Bordeaux	(France) Yannick Bru	(France) Jefferson Poirot	Stade Chaban-Delmas	34,694	Top 14 top 8 (6th) (SF)
(England) Bristol Bears	(Samoa) Pat Lam	(Samoa) Steve Luatua	Ashton Gate Stadium	27,000	Premiership top 8 (9th)
(South Africa) Bulls	(South Africa) Jake White	(South Africa) Marcell Coetzee	Loftus Versfeld Stadium	51,762	URC table rankings (6th) (QF)
(Wales) Cardiff	(England) Matt Sherratt	(Wales) Josh Turnbull	Cardiff Arms Park	12,125	URC Welsh Shield winner (10th)
(Ireland) Connacht	(England) Peter Wilkins	(Ireland) Jack Carty	Galway Sportsgrounds	8,129	URC table rankings (7th) (SF)
(England) Exeter Chiefs	(England) Rob Baxter	(England) Jack Yeandle	Sandy Park	13,593	Premiership top 8 (7th)
(Scotland) Glasgow Warriors	(South Africa) Franco Smith	(Scotland) Kyle Steyn	Scotstoun Stadium	7,351	URC Scottish/Italian Shield winner (4th) (QF)
(England) Harlequins	(Australia) Billy Millard	(South Africa) Stephan Lewies	Twickenham Stoop	14,800	Premiership top 8 (6th)
(France) La Rochelle	(Ireland) Ronan O'Gara	(France) Grégory Alldritt (France) Uini Atonio	Stade Marcel-Deflandre	16,700	Top 14 top 8 (2nd) (RU)
(England) Leicester Tigers	(Australia) Dan McKellar	(Argentina) Julián Montoya	Welford Road Stadium	25,849	Premiership top 8 (3rd) (SF)
(Ireland) Leinster	(Ireland) Leo Cullen	(Ireland) James Ryan (Ireland) Garry Ringrose	RDS Arena; Aviva Stadium	18,500; 51,700	URC Irish Shield winner (1st) (SF)
(France) Lyon	(France) Fabien Gengenbacher	(France) Baptiste Couilloud (Samoa) Jordan Taufua	Stade de Gerland	35,029	Top 14 top 8 (3rd) (QF)
(Ireland) Munster	(England) Graham Rowntree	(Ireland) Peter O'Mahony	Thomond Park	25,600	URC table rankings (5th) (CH)
(England) Northampton Saints	(England) Phil Dowson	(England) Lewis Ludlam	Franklin's Gardens	15,200	Premiership top 8 (4th) (SF)
(France) Racing 92	(England) Stuart Lancaster	(France) Henry Chavancy	Paris La Défense Arena	32,000	Top 14 top 8 (5th) (SF)
(England) Sale Sharks	(England) Alex Sanderson	(England) Ben Curry	AJ Bell Stadium	12,000	Premiership top 8 (2nd) (RU)
(England) Saracens	(Ireland) Mark McCall	(England) Owen Farrell	StoneX Stadium	10,500	Premiership top 8 (1st) (CH)
(France) Stade Français	(France) Laurent Labit	(France) Paul Gabrillagues	Stade Jean-Bouin	20,000	Top 14 top 8 (4th) (QF)
(South Africa) Stormers	(South Africa) John Dobson	(South Africa) Salmaan Moerat	Cape Town Stadium	55,000	URC South African Shield winner (3rd) (RU)
(France) Toulon	(France) Pierre Mignoni	(France) Charles Ollivon	Stade Mayol	17,500	Top 14 top 8 (7th)
(France) Toulouse	(France) Ugo Mola	(France) Antoine Dupont (France) Julien Marchand	Stade Ernest-Wallon	19,500	Top 14 top 8 (1st) (CH)
(Ireland) Ulster	(England) Dan McFarland	(Ireland) Iain Henderson	Ravenhill Stadium	18,196	URC table rankings (2nd) (QF)

== Pool stage ==
Locations
Locations of European teams of the 2023–24 European Rugby Champions Cup group stage.
Red: Pool A; Blue: Pool B; Green: Pool C; Purple: Pool D.
Locations of London teams of the 2023–24 European Rugby Champions Cup group stage.
Red: Pool A; Blue: Pool B.
Locations of South African teams of the 2023–24 European Rugby Champions Cup group stage.
Red: Pool A; Purple: Pool D.

Teams are awarded four points for a win, two for a draw, one bonus point for scoring four tries in a game, and one bonus point for losing by less than eight points.

The draw for the pool stage took place on 21 June 2023. Unlike the previous season, the format consisted of four pools with six teams in each. The rules of the draw stipulated that the 2022–23 champions of the three European domestic leagues (Saracens, Toulouse and Munster) and the 2022–23 Champions Cup winners (La Rochelle) would each be drawn into separate pools. The remaining 20 teams were then drawn at random, with the only condition being that no more than two teams from the same domestic league could be placed into each pool.

=== Pool A ===
2023–24 European Rugby Champions Cup Pool A
Team	P	W	D	L	PF	PA	Diff	TF	TA	TB	LB	Pts
(France) Bordeaux (4)	4	3	0	1	172	83	+89	26	11	4	1	17
(South Africa) Bulls (6)	4	3	0	1	132	102	+30	16	16	2	1	15
(France) Lyon (11)	4	2	0	2	121	123	–2	18	16	3	1	12
(England) Saracens (13)	4	2	0	2	125	142	–17	17	20	2	0	10
(Ireland) Connacht (11CC)	4	1	0	3	88	140	–52	13	19	2	0	6
(England) Bristol Bears	4	1	0	3	80	128	–48	11	19	1	0	5
Green background (rows 1 to 2) indicates qualification places for a home Champions Cup round of 16. Blue background (rows 3 to 4) indicates other teams qualified for the Champions Cup round of 16. Yellow background (row 5) indicates qualification place for the Challenge Cup round of 16. Plain background (row 6) indicates elimination from 2023–24 European competition. Starting table — source: European Professional Club Rugby

=== Pool B ===
2023–24 European Rugby Champions Cup Pool B
Team	P	W	D	L	PF	PA	Diff	TF	TA	TB	LB	Pts
(France) Toulouse (1)	4	4	0	0	178	69	+109	26	10	4	0	20
(England) Harlequins (5)	4	3	0	1	151	109	+42	22	16	3	0	15
(England) Bath (9)	4	3	0	1	124	102	+22	18	14	3	0	15
(France) Racing 92 (16)	4	1	0	3	116	117	–1	17	16	2	2	8
(Ireland) Ulster (12CC)	4	1	0	3	88	147	–59	12	22	1	0	5
(Wales) Cardiff	4	0	0	4	80	193	–113	11	28	2	1	3
Green background (rows 1 to 2) indicates qualification places for a home Champions Cup round of 16. Blue background (rows 3 to 4) indicates other teams qualified for the Champions Cup round of 16. Yellow background (row 5) indicates qualification place for the Challenge Cup round of 16. Plain background (row 6) indicates elimination from 2023–24 European competition. Starting table — source: European Professional Club Rugby

=== Pool C ===
2023–24 European Rugby Champions Cup Pool C
Team	P	W	D	L	PF	PA	Diff	TF	TA	TB	LB	Pts
(England) Northampton Saints (3)	4	4	0	0	137	75	+62	18	10	2	0	18
(England) Exeter Chiefs (8)	4	3	0	1	87	99	–12	13	14	1	0	13
(Scotland) Glasgow Warriors (12)	4	2	0	2	77	63	+14	12	8	1	1	10
(Ireland) Munster (14)	4	1	1	2	93	93	0	13	10	2	1	9
(France) Bayonne (9CC)	4	1	1	2	82	107	–25	11	16	1	1	8
(France) Toulon	4	0	0	4	60	99	–39	7	16	0	2	2
Green background (rows 1 to 2) indicates qualification places for a home Champions Cup round of 16. Blue background (rows 3 to 4) indicates other teams qualified for the Champions Cup round of 16. Yellow background (row 5) indicates qualification place for the Challenge Cup round of 16. Plain background (row 6) indicates elimination from 2023–24 European competition. Starting table — source: European Professional Club Rugby

=== Pool D ===
2023–24 European Rugby Champions Cup Pool D
Team	P	W	D	L	PF	PA	Diff	TF	TA	TB	LB	Pts
(Ireland) Leinster (2)	4	4	0	0	123	53	+70	17	5	3	0	19
(South Africa) Stormers (7)	4	3	0	1	102	99	+3	12	12	2	0	14
(France) La Rochelle (10)	4	2	0	2	111	73	+38	13	9	2	2	12
(England) Leicester Tigers (15)	4	2	0	2	84	122	–38	10	16	1	0	9
(England) Sale Sharks (10CC)	4	1	0	3	103	110	–7	13	14	1	1	6
(France) Stade Français	4	0	0	4	56	122	–66	8	17	0	2	2
Green background (rows 1 to 2) indicates qualification places for a home Champions Cup round of 16. Blue background (rows 3 to 4) indicates other teams qualified for the Champions Cup round of 16. Yellow background (row 5) indicates qualification place for the Challenge Cup round of 16. Plain background (row 6) indicates elimination from 2023–24 European competition. Starting table — source: European Professional Club Rugby

== Knockout stage ==
The knockout stage will begin with the round of 16, starting on 5 April 2024, and concludes with the final on 25 May 2024.

Like in 2022/23 the round of 16 will consist of a single leg match, consisting of the top four ranked teams from each Pool respectively. All clubs will thereafter be ranked in descending order based firstly on their ranking in their pool and subsequently on the number of match points they have accumulated, to create an overall ranking from 1 to 16. The pool winners will be ranked 1 to 4, the second-placed clubs will be ranked 5 to 8, the third-placed clubs will be ranked 9 to 12, and the fourth-placed clubs will be ranked 13 to 16.

Whilst the round of 16 follows a pre-determined format, the quarter-finals will see home advantage given to the higher ranked team based on a pre-determined match-up. The semi-finals are to be played at a neutral venue, with the higher ranked team having home country advantage.

=== Seeding ===
Rank	Team	Pts	Diff	TF
Pool leaders
1	(France) Toulouse	20	+109	26
2	(Ireland) Leinster	19	+70	17
3	(England) Northampton Saints	18	+62	18
4	(France) Bordeaux	17	+89	26
Pool runners-up
5	(England) Harlequins	15	+42	22
6	(South Africa) Bulls	15	+30	16
7	(South Africa) Stormers	14	+3	12
8	(England) Exeter Chiefs	13	–12	13
Pool third place
9	(England) Bath	15	+22	18
10	(France) La Rochelle	12	+38	13
11	(France) Lyon	12	–2	18
12	(Scotland) Glasgow Warriors	10	+14	12
Pool fourth place
13	(England) Saracens	10	–17	17
14	(Ireland) Munster	9	0	13
15	(England) Leicester Tigers	9	–38	10
16	(France) Racing 92	8	–1	17

=== Bracket ===
Round of 16
1	(France) Toulouse	31
16	(France) Racing 92	7
8	(England) Exeter Chiefs	21
9	(England) Bath	15
4	(France) Bordeaux	45
13	(England) Saracens	12
5	(England) Harlequins	28
12	(Scotland) Glasgow Warriors	24
2	(Ireland) Leinster	36
15	(England) Leicester Tigers	22
7	(South Africa) Stormers	21
10	(France) La Rochelle	22
3	(England) Northampton Saints	24
14	(Ireland) Munster	14
6	(South Africa) Bulls	59
11	(France) Lyon	19

Quarter-finals
1	(France) Toulouse	64
8	(England) Exeter Chiefs	26
4	(France) Bordeaux	41
5	(England) Harlequins	42
2	(Ireland) Leinster	40
10	(France) La Rochelle	13
3	(England) Northampton Saints	59
6	(South Africa) Bulls	22

Semi-finals
1	(France) Toulouse	38
5	(England) Harlequins	26
2	(Ireland) Leinster	20
3	(England) Northampton Saints	17

Final
1	(France) Toulouse (a.e.t.)	31
2	(Ireland) Leinster	22

=== Round of 16 ===
5 April 2024
20:00

Harlequins (England) (5)	28–24	(12) (Scotland) Glasgow Warriors
Try: Esterhuizen 22' c M. Smith 33' c Murley 40+1' c Riley 75' c Con: M. Smith (4/4) 24', 34', 40+2', 77'	Report	Try: Cummings 2' c Matthews 49' c Horne 52' c Con: Horne (3/3) 3', 50', 53'; Pen: Horne (1/1) 59'

Twickenham Stoop, London
Attendance: 12,852
Referee: Tual Trainini (France)

6 April 2024
13:30

Bulls (South Africa) (6)	59–19	(11) (France) Lyon
Try: De Klerk (2) 12' c, 77' m Papier (2) 20' c, 53' c Coetzee 27' c Vermaak 33' c Le Roux 48' m Kriel 67' c C. Smith 71' c Con: Goosen (5/6) 13', 21', 28', 34', 54'; C. Smith (2/3) 69', 72'	Report	Try: Page-Relo 30' c Penalty try 46'; Abrahams 55' m Con: Jackson (1/2) 31'

Loftus Versfeld Stadium, Pretoria
Attendance: 7,516
Referee: Luke Pearce (England)

6 April 2024
16:00

Stormers (South Africa) (7)	21–22	(10) (France) La Rochelle
Try: Jantjies 27' c Hartzenberg 79' m Con: Libbok (1/2) 29'; Pen: Libbok (3/3) 3', 22', 45'	Report	Try: Penverne 49' c Alldritt 61' c Sclavi 68' m Con: Hastoy (2/3) 49', 62'; Pen: Hastoy (1/1) 54'

Cape Town Stadium, Cape Town
Attendance: 27,660
Referee: Matthew Carley (England)

6 April 2024
15:00

Exeter Chiefs (England) (8)	21–15	(9) (England) Bath
Try: Vintcent 23' c Fisilau 55' c Roots 65' c Con: Slade (3/3) 23', 56', 66'	Report	Try: du Toit 20' m Hill 27' c Con: Spencer (1/2) 28'; Pen: Spencer (1/1) 48'

Sandy Park, Exeter
Attendance: 15,000
Referee: Luc Ramos (France)

6 April 2024
18:30

Bordeaux (France) (4)	45–12	(13) (England) Saracens
Try: Garcia (2) 36' c, 48' c Depoortère (2) 60' c, 66' c Bielle-Biarrey (2) 63' c, 75' c Con: Lucu (4/4) 37', 48', 62', 64'; Garcia (2/2) 67', 76'; Pen: Lucu (1/1) 29'	Report	Try: Lewington 71' m Willis 78' c Con: Goode (1/2) 80'

Stade Chaban-Delmas, Bordeaux
Attendance: 28,097
Referee: Frank Murphy (Ireland)

6 April 2024
20:00

Leinster (Ireland) (2)	36–22	(15) (England) Leicester Tigers
Try: Gibson-Park (3) 12' c, 23' m, 29' c Henshaw 49' c Conan 71' c Con: R. Byrne (3/4) 13', 30', 50'; H. Byrne (1/1) 72'; Pen: R. Byrne (1/1) 9'	Report	Try: Pollard 4' c Cronin 45' m Clare 75' c Con: Pollard (2/3) 5', 76'; Pen: Pollard (1/1) 28'

Aviva Stadium, Dublin
Attendance: 40,775
Referee: Pierre Brousset (France)

7 April 2024
12:30

Northampton Saints (England) (3)	24–14	(14) (Ireland) Munster
Try: Ramm 9' c Freeman 35' c Hendy (2) 60' m, 72'; Con: Smith (2/4) 10', 36'	Report	Try: O'Brien 14' c Haley 27' c Con: Crowley (2/2) 15', 28'

Franklin's Gardens, Northampton
Attendance: 15,153
Referee: Mike Adamson (Scotland)

7 April 2024
16:00

Toulouse (France) (1)	31–7	(16) (France) Racing 92
Try: Mauvaka 5' m Lebel 33' m Costes 55' c Ahki 68' c Roumat 80' c Con: Kinghorn (3/5) 56', 69', 80+2'	Report	Try: Ben Arous 74' c Con: Tedder (1/1) 75'

Stade Ernest-Wallon, Toulouse
Attendance: 18,504
Referee: Karl Dickson (England)

=== Quarter-finals ===
13 April 2024
16:00

Bordeaux (France) (4)	41–42	(5) (England) Harlequins
Try: Lucu 19' m Buros 24' c Depoortère 42' c Bielle-Biarrey 59' c Tambwe (2) 64' c, 75' m Con: Lucu (4/6) 25', 43', 60', 65'; Pen: Lucu (1/1) 52'	Report	Try: Porter (2) 2' c, 29' c Penalty try 8'; W. Evans 40' c Dombrandt 56' c Green 71' c Con: Smith (5/5) 3', 30', 42', 58', 73'

Stade Chaban-Delmas, Bordeaux
Attendance: 28,056
Referee: Andrea Piardi (Italy)

13 April 2024
17:30

Leinster (Ireland) (2)	40–13	(10) (France) La Rochelle
Try: Lowe (2) 16', 60'; Gibson-Park 37'; Baird 42'; Sheehan 56'; Con: Byrne (3/4) 18', 38', 43'; Pen: Byrne (3/3) 7', 27', 31'	Report	Try: Penverne 40'; Con: Hastoy 40'; Pen: Hastoy (2/2) 19', 28'

Aviva Stadium, Dublin
Attendance: 50,055
Referee: Karl Dickson (England)

13 April 2024
20:00

Northampton Saints (England) (3)	59–22	(6) (South Africa) Bulls
Try: Ramm 10’ Lawes 15’ Sleightholme 20’ Mitchell (2) 24’, 67'; Coles 40’ Ramm 47'; Dingwall 50'; Augustus 72'; Con: Smith (7/9) 11', 16', 21', 25', 41', 51', 68'	Report	Try: Hanekom 13'; Van der Merwe 31'; De Klerk 35'; Con: Smith (2/3) 14', 36'; Pen: Smith (2/3) 17'

Franklin's Gardens, Northampton
Attendance: 12,972
Referee: Mathieu Raynal (France)

14 April 2024
16:00

Toulouse (France) (1)	64–26	(8) (England) Exeter Chiefs
Try: Ntamack 7'; Willis 31'; Kinghorn (2) 47', 55'; Ahki (2) 50', 74'; Dupont 57'; Cruz Mallía (2) 66', 78'; Con: Kinghorn (5/5) 8', 32', 48', 52', 56'; Ramos (3/4) 58', 68', 75'; Pen: Kinghorn 20'	Report	Try: Roots 16'; Wimbush 61'; Con: Slade (2/2) 17', 62'; Pen: Slade (4/4) 5', 12', 28', 43'

Stade Ernest-Wallon, Toulouse
Attendance: 18,678
Referee: Chris Busby (Ireland)

=== Semi-finals ===
4 May 2024
17:30

Leinster (Ireland) (2)	20–17	(3) (England) Northampton Saints
Try: Lowe (3) 10' c, 14' m, 43' m Con: R. Byrne (1/3) 11'; Pen: R. Byrne (1/1) 29'	Report	Try: Hendy 58' c Seabrook 74' c Con: Smith (2/2) 59', 74'; Pen: Smith (1/1) 39'

Croke Park, Dublin
Attendance: 82,300
Referee: Mathieu Raynal (France)

5 May 2024
16:00

Toulouse (France) (1)	38–26	(5) (England) Harlequins
Try: Lebel 3' m Mauvaka 17' c Flament 26' m Dupont (2) 32' c, 36' c Cruz Mallía 67' c Con: Kinghorn (3/5) 20', 34', 37'; Ramos (1/1) 69'	Report	Try: Smith 13' c Evans 23' m Murley 45' c Green 52' c Con: Smith 14', 46', 53'

Stadium de Toulouse, Toulouse
Attendance: 32,494
Referee: Andrew Brace (Ireland)

=== Final ===
25 May 2024
14:45 BST (UTC+01)

Leinster (Ireland)	22–31 (a.e.t.)	(France) Toulouse
Try: Van der Flier 93'; Con: Frawley (1/1) 97'; Pen: Byrne (4/5) 18', 43', 46', 65'; Frawley (1/1) 77'	Report	Try: Lebel 82'; Con: Ramos (1/1) 84'; Pen: Kinghorn (4/5) 4', 7', 36', 57'; Ramos (4/5) 70', 88', 92', 95'

Tottenham Hotspur Stadium, London
Attendance: 61,531
Referee: Matthew Carley (England)

== Leading scorers ==
Note: Flags to the left of player names indicate national team as has been defined under World Rugby eligibility rules, or primary nationality for players who have not yet earned international senior caps. Players may hold one or more non-WR nationalities.

=== Most points ===
As of 25 May 2024

Rank	Player	Club	Points
1	(England) Marcus Smith	(England) Harlequins	85
2	(France) Thomas Ramos	(France) Toulouse	77
3	(England) Fin Smith	(England) Northampton Saints	72
4	(France) Antoine Hastoy	(France) Stade Rochelais	64
5	(Scotland) Blair Kinghorn	(France) Toulouse	59

=== Most tries ===
As of 25 May 2024

Rank	Player	Club	Tries
1	(Ireland) James Lowe	(Ireland) Leinster	6
1	(France) Louis Bielle-Biarrey	(France) Bordeaux	6
1	(France) Matthis Lebel	(France) Toulouse	6
4	(France) Romain Buros	(France) Bordeaux	5
4	(South Africa) Andre Esterhuizen	(England) Harlequins	5
4	(Ireland) Jamison Gibson-Park	(Ireland) Leinster	5
4	(France) Peato Mauvaka	(France) Toulouse	5
4	(France) Antoine Dupont	(France) Toulouse	5
4	(South Africa) Thaakir Abrahams	(France) Lyon	5

== See also ==
- 2023–24 EPCR Challenge Cup
