= Max Spring =

France international rugby union player (born 2001)

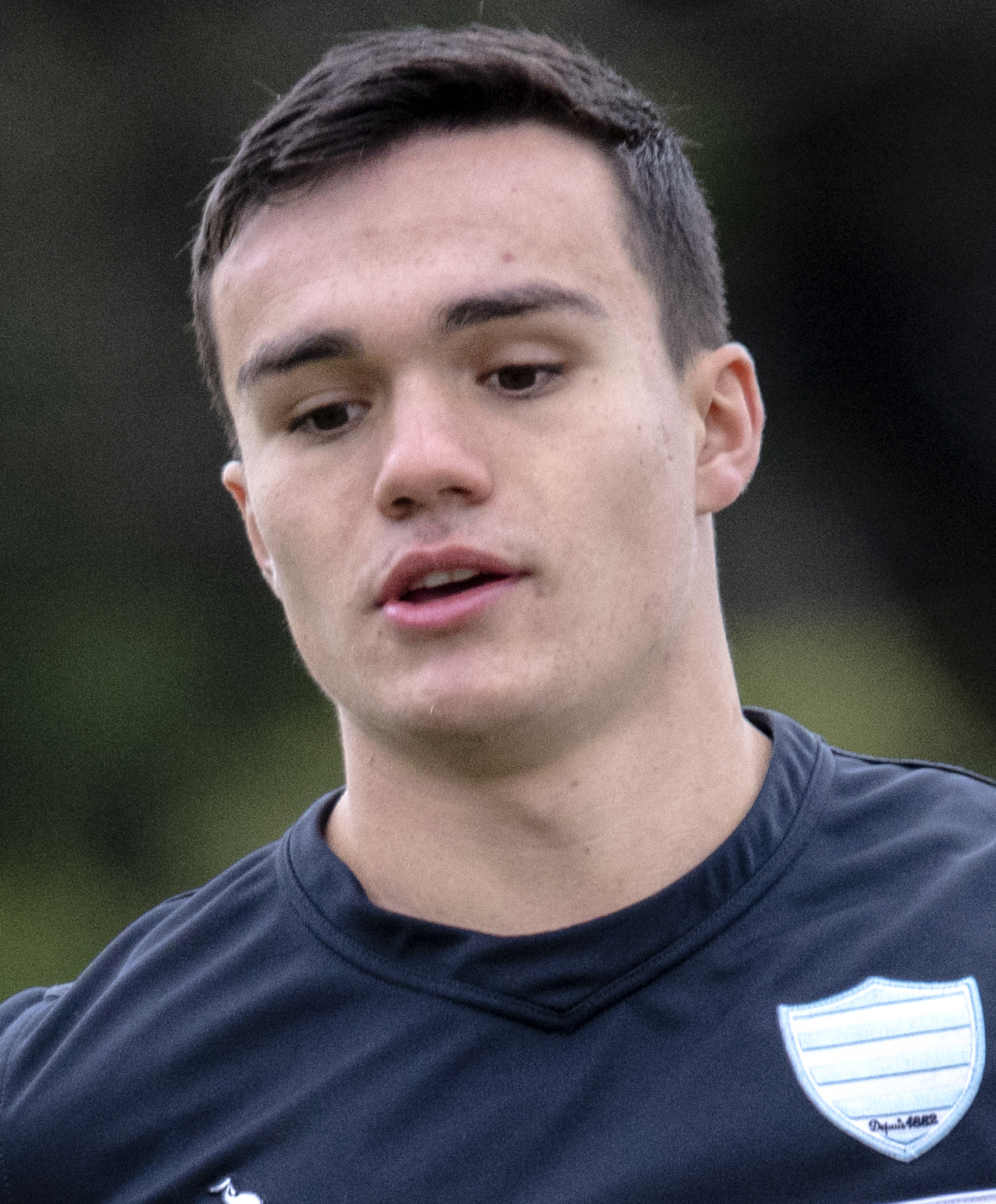
- Born: Max Spring; 15 March 2001 (age 25) Saint-Palais, France
- Height: 1.73 m (5 ft 8 in)
- Weight: 75 kg (11 st 11 lb; 165 lb)

Rugby union career
- Position(s): Fullback, Wing
- Current team: Racing 92
Youth career
- 2006–2016: Nafarroa
- 2016–2019: Bayonne
- 2019–2020: Racing 92
Senior career
Years	Team	Apps	(Points)
2020–	Racing 92	87	(67)
- Correct as of 21 March 2025
International career
Years	Team	Apps	(Points)
2022–	France	1	(0)
- Correct as of 9 July 2022

Max Spring (born 15 March 2001) is a French rugby union player. He currently plays as a fullback for Racing 92 in the Top 14.

His father is a former New Zealand player who settled down in France and his mother is from French Basque Country. His brother, Tom Spring, plays for Bayonne.

== Career ==
On 19 June 2022, Max Spring scored a late try with the Barbarians against England at Twickenham, during the 2022 mid-year rugby union tests.

He was called by Fabien Galthié to the French national team for the first time in June 2022, for the summer tour of Japan.
