= Dorian Aldegheri =

French rugby union player (born 1993)

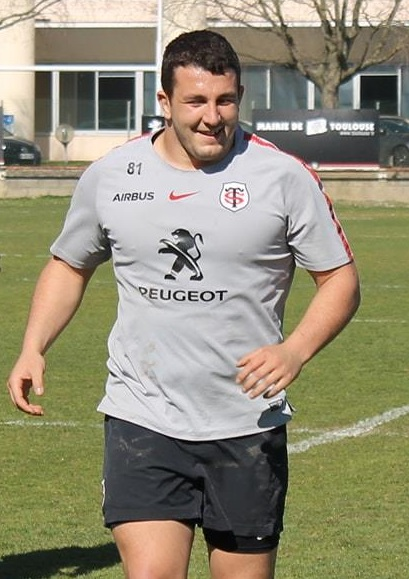
- Aldegheri with Toulouse in 2019
- Born: 4 August 1993 (age 33) Toulouse, France
- Height: 1.80 m (5 ft 11 in)
- Weight: 120 kg (265 lb; 18 st 13 lb)

Rugby union career
- Position: Prop
- Current team: Toulouse
Senior career
| Years | Team | Apps | (Points) |
| 2013– | Toulouse | 195 | (15) |
- Correct as of 27 May 2024
International career
| Years | Team | Apps | (Points) |
| 2019– | France | 28 | (0) |
- Correct as of 14 March 2026

Dorian Aldegheri (born 4 August 1993) is a French professional rugby union player who plays as a prop for Top 14 club Toulouse and the France national team.

== Professional career ==
Aldegheri won his first cap for France as a replacement in the side's loss to England in the 2019 Six Nations.

== Personal life ==
Aldegheri was born in France to a Tunisian father and Italian mother. He uses his mother's last name.

== Honours ==
France

- 2x Six Nations Championship: 2025, 2026

Toulouse

- 2× European Rugby Champions Cup: 2021, 2024
- 4× Top 14: 2019, 2021, 2023, 2024
