= Pierre Bourgarit =

France international rugby union player

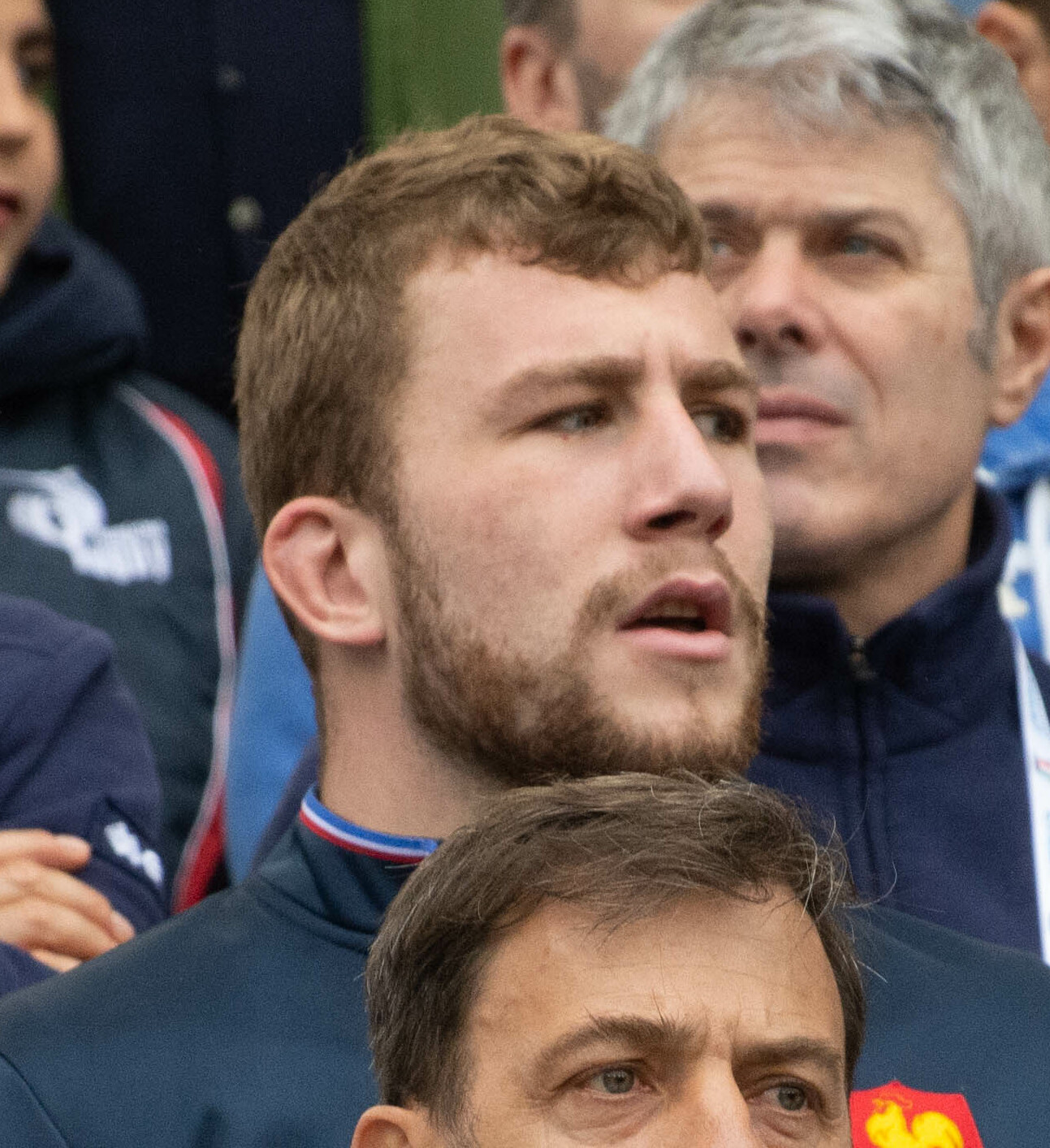
- Bourgarit with France in 2019
- Born: 12 September 1997 (age 29) Gimont, France
- Height: 1.84 m (6 ft 1/2 in)
- Weight: 105 kg (231 lb; 16 st 7 lb)

Rugby union career
- Position: Hooker
- Current team: La Rochelle
Senior career
Years	Team	Apps	(Points)
2016–2017	Auch	7	(5)
2017–	La Rochelle	133	(135)
- Correct as of 19 January 2019
International career
Years	Team	Apps	(Points)
2016–2017	France U20	3	(0)
2018–	France	17	(5)
- Correct as of 19 July 2025

Pierre Bourgarit (born 12 September 1997) is a French rugby union player. His position is hooker and he currently plays for Stade Rochelais in the Top 14.

== International career ==
=== International tries ===
International tries
No.	Date	Venue	Opponent	Score	Result	Competition
1	2 July 2022	Toyota Stadium, Toyota, Japan	Japan	16–40	23–42	2022 Japan test series

== Honours ==
=== Club ===
(France) La Rochelle

- European Rugby Champions Cup: 2021–2022
