= Shōgo Nakano =

Japanese rugby union player

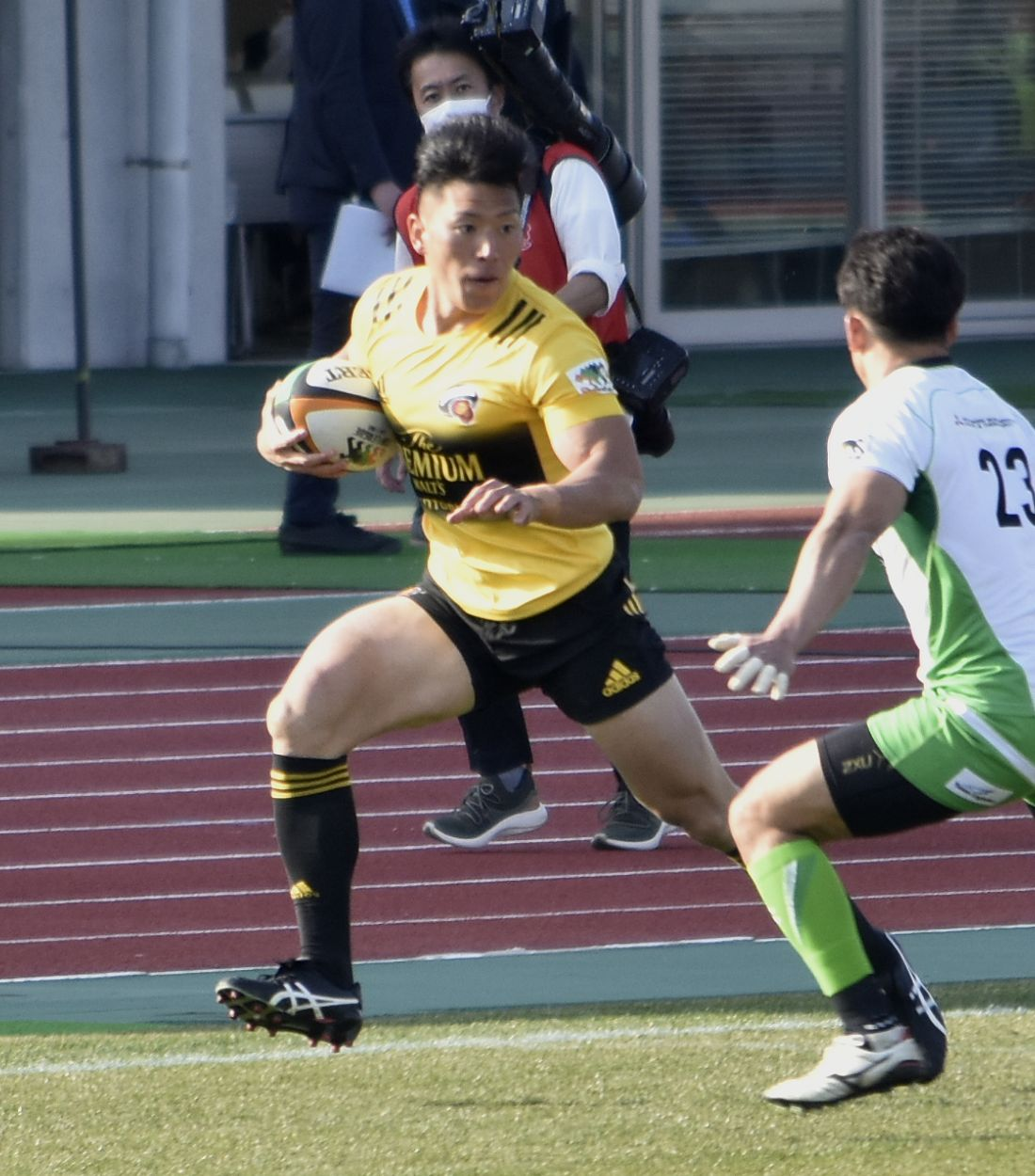
- Born: 11 June 1997 (age 29) Fukuoka, Japan
- Height: 1.86 m (6 ft 1 in)
- Weight: 100 kg (220 lb; 15 st 10 lb)

Rugby union career
- Position(s): Centre, Wing
- Current team: Suntory Sungoliath
Senior career
Years	Team	Apps	(Points)
2020	Sunwolves	5	(5)
2021–	Suntory Sungoliath	73	(125)
- Correct as of 28 August 2023
International career
Years	Team	Apps	(Points)
2015–2023	Japan XV	8	(10)
2021–	Japan	11	(5)
- Correct as of 28 August 2023

Shōgo Nakano (中野将伍, Nakano Shōgo; born 11 June 1997) is a Japanese professional rugby union player who plays as a centre for Japan Rugby League One club Tokyo Sungoliath and the Japan national team.

== International career ==
Japan head coach Jamie Joseph has named Shunsuke Asaoka in a 52-man training squad ahead of British and Irish Lions test.
