= 2022–23 Top 14 season =

French rugby union season

2022–23 Top 14
- Countries: France
- Number of teams: 14
- Date: 3 September 2022 – 17 June 2023
- Champions: Toulouse (22nd title)
- Runners-up: La Rochelle
- Relegated: Brive
- Matches played: 182
- Attendance: 2,701,031 (average 14,841 per match)
- Highest attendance: 43,803; (Toulon v Toulouse, 6 May)
- Tries scored: 919 (average 5 per match)
- Top point scorer: (France) Joris Segonds (Stade Français) (240)
- Top try scorer: (France) Émilien Gailleton (Pau) (14)

The 2022–23 Top 14 is the 124th French domestic rugby union club competition operated by the Ligue Nationale de Rugby (LNR).

== Format ==
The top six teams at the end of the regular season (after all the teams played one another twice, once at home, once away) enter a knockout stage to decide the Champions of France. This consists of three rounds: the teams finishing third to sixth in the table play quarter-finals (hosted by the third and fourth placed teams). The winners then face the top two teams in the semi-finals, with the winners meeting in the final at the Stade de France in Saint-Denis. The LNR uses a slightly different bonus points system from that used in most other rugby competitions. It trialled a new system in 2007–08 explicitly designed to prevent a losing team from earning more than one bonus point in a match, a system that also made it impossible for either team to earn a bonus point in a drawn match. LNR chose to continue with this system for subsequent seasons.

France's bonus point system operates as follows:

- 4 points for a win.
- 2 points for a draw.
- 1 bonus point for winning while scoring at least 3 more tries than the opponent. This replaces the standard bonus point for scoring 4 tries regardless of the match result.
- 1 bonus point for losing by 5 points (or fewer). The margin had been 7 points until being changed prior to the 2014–15 season.

From the 2017–18 season onwards, only the 14th placed team is automatically relegated to the Pro D2. The 13th placed team play the runner-up of the Pro D2 play-off, with the winner taking up the final place in the Top 14 for the following season.

== Teams ==
Locations of the 2021–22 Top 14 teams

Fourteen clubs will compete in the 2022-23 Top 14 season, 13 of them returning. Biarritz were relegated to Pro D2 after finishing at the bottom of the table the previous season. Bayonne is the sole promoted club, finishing second in the Pro D2 the previous season and winning the Pro D2 playoffs. Perpignan, which finished 13th in the previous Top 14 season, defeated Mont-de-Marsan in the relegation playoffs to retain their place.

Club	City (department)	Stadium	Capacity	Previous season
Bayonne	Bayonne (Pyrénées-Atlantiques)	Stade Jean Dauger	16,934	Promoted from Pro D2 (runners-up)
Bordeaux Bègles	Bordeaux (Gironde)	Stade Chaban-Delmas (Note: In recent years, Bordeaux Bègles has taken occasional home matches to Matmut Atlantique.)	33,500	Semi-finals (4th in league)
Brive	Brive-la-Gaillarde (Corrèze)	Stade Amédée-Domenech	13,979	11th
Castres	Castres (Tarn)	Stade Pierre-Fabre	12,500	7th
Clermont	Clermont-Ferrand (Puy-de-Dôme)	Stade Marcel-Michelin	19,022	Quarter-finals (5th in league)
La Rochelle	La Rochelle (Charente-Maritime)	Stade Marcel-Deflandre	16,000	2nd
Lyon	Lyon (Métropole de Lyon)	Matmut Stadium de Gerland	25,000	9th
Montpellier	Montpellier (Hérault)	Altrad Stadium	15,697	10th
Pau	Pau (Pyrénées-Atlantiques)	Stade du Hameau	18,324	12th
Perpignan	Perpignan (Pyrénées-Orientales)	Stade Aimé Giral	14,593	Promoted from Pro D2 (champions)
Racing	Nanterre (Hauts-de-Seine)	Paris La Défense Arena	30,681	Semi-finals (3rd in league)
Stade Français	Paris, 16th arrondissement	Stade Jean-Bouin	20,000	Quarter-finals (6th in league)
Toulon	Toulon (Var)	Stade Mayol (Note: In recent years, Toulon has taken occasional home matches to Stade Vélodrome in Marseille and Allianz Riviera in Nice.)	18,200	8th
Toulouse	Toulouse (Haute-Garonne)	Stade Ernest-Wallon (Note: Toulouse often takes high-demand home matches to the city's largest sporting venue, Stadium de Toulouse.)	18,784	1st

== Table ==
2022–23 Top 14 Table
	Club	Played	Won	Drawn	Lost	Points For	Points Against	Points Diff.	Try Bonus	Losing Bonus	Points
1	Toulouse (CH)	26	17	1	8	682	474	+208	8	3	81
2	La Rochelle (RU)	26	17	0	9	673	479	+194	7	3	78
3	Lyon (QF)	26	14	1	11	688	626	+62	4	5	67
4	Stade Français (QF)	26	13	2	11	616	480	+136	5	6	67
5	Racing (SF)	26	14	1	11	734	684	+50	5	3	66
6	Bordeaux Bègles (SF)	26	13	1	12	576	501	+75	4	5	63
7	Toulon	26	14	0	12	588	557	+31	3	2	61
8	Bayonne	26	13	1	12	596	662	–66	2	2	58
9	Castres	26	13	1	12	532	635	–103	1	2	57
10	Clermont	26	11	1	14	588	635	–39	4	6	56
11	Montpellier	26	11	0	15	624	617	+7	4	6	54
12	Pau	26	10	1	15	591	634	–43	6	4	52
13	Perpignan	26	10	0	16	503	724	–221	0	3	43
14	Brive (R)	26	7	0	19	440	731	–291	1	7	36
If teams are level at any stage, tiebreakers are applied in the following order: 1. Competition points earned in head-to-head matches 2. Points difference in head-to-head matches 3. Try differential in head-to-head matches 4. Points difference in all matches 5. Try differential in all matches 6. Points scored in all matches 7. Tries scored in all matches 8. Fewer matches forfeited 9. Classification in the previous Top 14 season
Green background (rows 1 and 2) receive semi-final play-off places and receive berths in the 2023–24 European Rugby Champions Cup. Blue background (rows 3 to 6) receive quarter-final play-off places, and receive berths in the Champions Cup. Yellow background (row 7 and 8) receive berths in the Champions Cup. Plain background indicates teams that earn a place in the 2023–24 EPCR Challenge Cup. Pink background (row 13) will be contest a play-off with the runners-up of the 2022–23 Rugby Pro D2 season for a place in the 2023–24 Top 14 season. Red background (row 14) will be relegated to Rugby Pro D2. Final table

== Relegation play-off ==
3 June 2023
21:05

Grenoble	19–33	Perpignan
Try: Barthélémy 36' c Con: Trouilloud (1/1) 38'; Pen: Trouilloud (3/3) 20', 34', 61'; Drop: Barthélémy (1/1) 25'	Report	Try: Tuilagi 7' m Lam 53' c Deghmache 57' m McIntyre 66' c Con: Tedder (2/4) 53, 66'; Pen: Tedder (2/2) 22', 30'; Laborde (1/1) 78'

Stade des Alpes
Attendance: 19,662
Referee: Adrien Descottes

Perpignan won and therefore both clubs remained in their respective leagues.

== Playoffs ==
Semi-final Qualifiers
4	Stade Français	20
5	Racing	33
3	Lyon	25
6	Bordeaux Bègles	32

Semi-finals
1	Toulouse	41
5	Racing	14
2	La Rochelle	24
6	Bordeaux Bègles	13

Final
1	Toulouse	29
2	La Rochelle	26

=== Semi-final Qualifiers ===
3 June 2023
14:00

Stade Français (4)	20–33	(5) Racing
Try: Macalou 33' c Penalty try 40+1'; Con: Segonds (1/1) 35'; Pen: Segonds (2/2) 17', 69'	Report	Try: Imhoff 10' c Lauret 19' c Fickou 80' c Con: Gibert (2/2) 11', 20'; Pen: Russell (4/4) 26', 44', 52', 55'

Stade Jean-Bouin
Attendance: 18,691
Referee: Pierre Brousset

4 June 2023
21:05

Lyon (3)	25–32	(6) Bordeaux Bègles
Try: Dumortier 10' c Tuisova 30' c Maraku 74' m Con: Sopoaga (2/2) 11', 32'; Pen: Sopoaga (2/2) 40+1', 58'	Report	Try: Jalibert 7' m Diaby 47' c Tambwe (2) 67' c, 78' c Con: Jalibert (3/4) 48', 68', 79'; Pen: Jalibert (1/1) 24'; Lucu (1/1) 71'

Matmut Stadium de Gerland
Attendance: 17,304
Referee: Ludovic Cayre

=== Semi-finals ===
9 June 2023
21:00

Toulouse (1)	41–14	(5) Racing
Try: Lebel 18' c Meafou 23' c Roumat 50' c Retière 58' c Cros 80' c Con: Ramos (5/5) 19', 24', 51', 59', 80+1'; Pen: Ramos (2/2) 34', 40+1'	Report	Try: Fickou 71' c Diallo 76' c Con: Russell (2/2) 72', 77'

Anoeta Stadium
Attendance: 39,252
Referee: Mathieu Raynal

10 June 2023
17:00

La Rochelle (2)	24–13	(6) Bordeaux Bègles
Try: Leyds 9' c Bourgarit 21' c Boudehent 38' c Con: Hastoy (3/3) 10', 22', 39'; Pen: Hastoy (1/2) 71'	Report	Try: Penalty try 49'; Pen: Jalibert (2/2) 4', 44'

Anoeta Stadium
Attendance: 39,314
Referee: Adrien Marbot

=== Final ===
17 June 2023
21:00

Toulouse (1)	29–26	(2) La Rochelle
Try: Chocobares 23' c Ntamack 78' c Con: Ramos (2/2) 25', 79'; Pen: Ramos (5/6) 10', 21', 51', 60', 63'	Report	Try: Kerr-Barlow 39' c Atonio 45' c Con: Hastoy (2/2) 40', 46'; Pen: Hastoy (4/6) 16', 30', 67', 71'

Stade de France, Saint-Denis
Attendance: 79,804
Referee: Tual Trainini

FB	15	(France) Thomas Ramos
RW	14	(France) Arthur Retière
OC	13	(Argentina) Santiago Chocobares
IC	12	(Tonga) Pita Ahki
LW	11	(France) Matthis Lebel
FH	10	(France) Romain Ntamack
SH	9	(France) Antoine Dupont (c)
N8	8	(France) Alexandre Roumat
OF	7	(France) Francois Cros
BF	6	(England) Jack Willis
RL	5	(Australia) Emmanuel Meafou
LL	4	(Australia) Richie Arnold
TP	3	(France) Dorian Aldegheri
HK	2	(France) Julien Marchand
LP	1	(France) Cyril Baille
Substitutions:
HK	16	(France) Peato Mauvaka
PR	17	(France) Rodrigue Neti
LK	18	(France) Thibaud Flament
N8	19	(France) Alban Placines
FL	20	(France) Selevasio Tolofua
CE	21	(France) Pierre-Louis Barassi
WG	22	(Argentina) Juan Cruz Mallia
PR	23	(New Zealand) Charlie Faumuina
Coach:
(France) Ugo Mola

FB	15	(France) Brice Dulin
RW	14	(South Africa) Dillyn Leyds
OC	13	(Samoa) Ulupano Seuteni
IC	12	(France) Jonathan Danty
LW	11	(South Africa) Raymond Rhule
FH	10	(France) Antoine Hastoy
SH	9	(New Zealand) Tawera Kerr-Barlow
N8	8	(France) Grégory Alldritt
OF	7	(Fiji) Levani Botia
BF	6	(France) Paul Boudehent
RL	5	(Australia) Will Skelton
LL	4	(France) Romain Sazy
TP	3	(France) Uini Atonio (c)
HK	2	(France) Pierre Bourgarit
LP	1	(France) Reda Wardi
Substitutions:
HK	16	(France) Quentin Lespiaucq
PR	17	(Argentina) Joel Sclavi
LK	18	(France) Thomas Lavault
FL	19	(Republic of Ireland) Ultan Dillane
FL	20	(France) Remi Bourdeau
FH	21	(France) Thomas Berjon
CE	22	(France) Jules Favre
PR	23	(France) Georges-Henri Colombe
Coach:
(Ireland) Ronan O'Gara

== See also ==
- List of 2022–23 Top 14 transfers
- 2022–23 Rugby Pro D2 season
