= Thomas Jolmès =

France international rugby union player (born 1995)

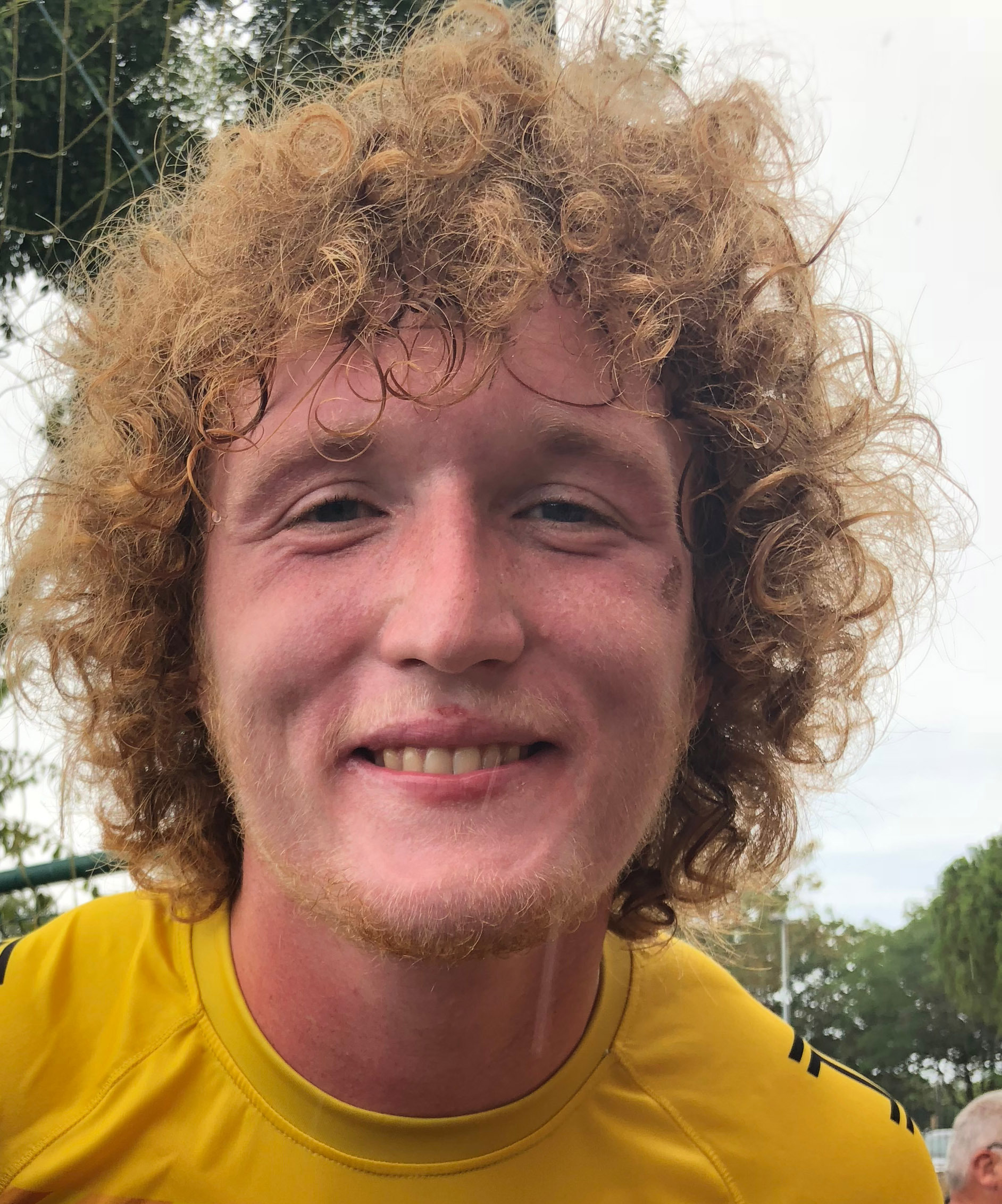
- Jolmès with La Rochelle in 2018
- Born: Thomas Jolmès; 8 October 1995 (age 31) Échirolles, France
- Height: 2.05 m (6 ft 8 1/2 in)
- Weight: 125 kg (19 st 10 lb; 276 lb)

Rugby union career
- Position: Lock
- Current team: Pau
Youth career
- 2005–2009: RC Seyssins
- 2009–2015: Grenoble
Senior career
Years	Team	Apps	(Points)
2015–2017	Grenoble	17	(0)
2017–2020	La Rochelle	39	(0)
2020–2021	Toulon	12	(5)
2021–2024	Bordeaux Bègles	79	(0)
2024–	Pau	18	(0)
- Correct as of 21 June 2022
International career
Years	Team	Apps	(Points)
2018	French Barbarians	3	(0)
2022–	France	1	(0)
- Correct as of 2 July 2022

Thomas Jolmès (born 8 October 1995) is a French rugby union player. He currently plays as a lock for Pau in the Top 14.

== Career ==
After playing for Grenoble, La Rochelle and Toulon at the highest level, Thomas Jolmès signed for Bordeaux Bègles in 2021 and became an important player of the team.

He was called by Fabien Galthié to the French national team for the first time in June 2022, for the summer tour of Japan.
