= Louis Penverne =

French rugby union player

- Born: 22 February 2003 (age 23)
- Height: 1.87 m (6 ft 2 in)
- Weight: 111 kg (17 st 7 lb; 245 lb)

Rugby union career
- Position: Prop
- Current team: La Rochelle
Amateur team(s)
Years	Team	Apps	(Points)
2011-2020	Rugby Ovalie Lorient		
2020-2021	Vannes		
Senior career
Years	Team	Apps	(Points)
2022-	La Rochelle	13	(10)
International career
Years	Team	Apps	(Points)
2023	France U20	8	(5)

Louis Penverne (born 22 February 2003) is a French rugby union player who plays at prop forward for Top 14 club La Rochelle.

== Career ==
From Brittany, he trained at Rugby Ovalie Lorient and is a former Rugby Club Vannes young player.

On 30 August 2023, he signed a three-year extension with La Rochelle. He made his Top 14 starting debut for the club against Toulon in January 2024.

Playing for La Rochelle, he produced notable performances in the European Rugby Champions Cup during the 2023-24 season.

== International career ==
He played for the France U20 side that won the 2023 World Rugby U20 Championship.
