= Thomas Lavault =

France international rugby union player

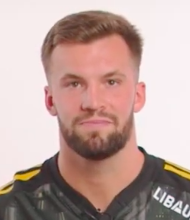
- Lavault representing La Rochelle
- Born: 3 May 1999 (age 27) Thouars, France
- Height: 1.99 m (6 ft 6 in)
- Weight: 108 kg (238 lb; 17 st 0 lb)

Rugby union career
- Position: Lock
- Current team: La Rochelle
Senior career
| Years | Team | Apps | (Points) |
| 2019– | La Rochelle | 88 | (15) |
- Correct as of 10 June 2023
International career
| Years | Team | Apps | (Points) |
| 2018–2019 | France U20 | 12 | (5) |
| 2022– | France | 2 | (0) |
- Correct as of 18 March 2023

Thomas Lavault (born 3 May 1999) is a French professional rugby union player who plays as a lock for Top 14 club La Rochelle and the France national team.

== Honours ==
La Rochelle

- 1× European Rugby Champions Cup: 2022, 2023
