= Mateo Garcia =

French rugby union player

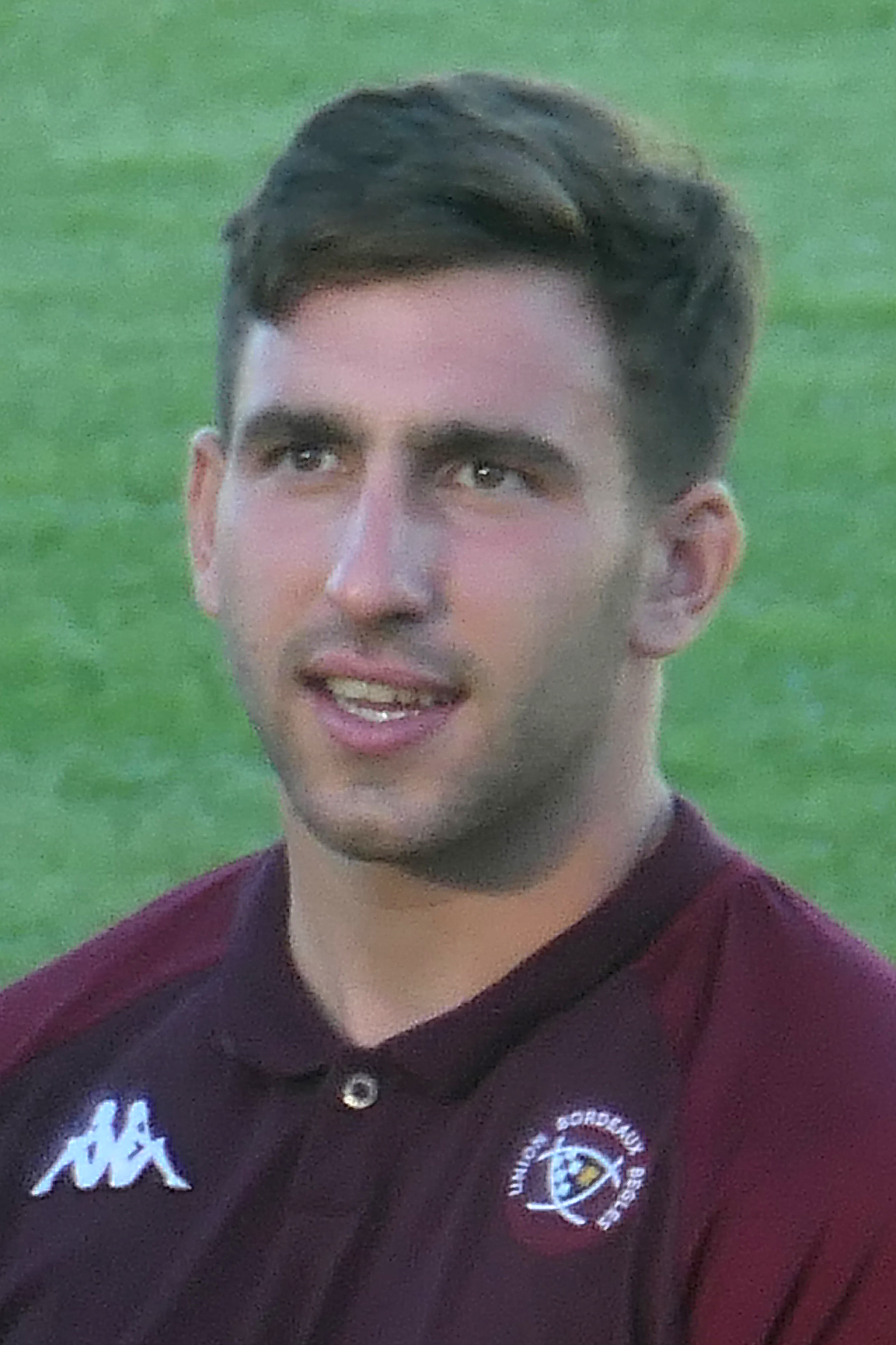
- Garcia in 2022
- Born: 8 July 2002 (age 24)
- Height: 1.74 m (5 ft 8 1/2 in)
- Weight: 79 kg (174 lb; 12 st 6 lb)

Rugby union career
- Position: Fly-half
- Current team: Bordeaux Bègles
Senior career
Years	Team	Apps	(Points)
2022–	Bordeaux Bègles	48	(187)
- Correct as of 27 May 2025
International career
Years	Team	Apps	(Points)
2021–2022	France U20	5	(0)
- Correct as of 27 May 2025

Mateo García (born 8 July 2002) is a French rugby union player who plays at Fly-half for Union Bordeaux Bègles.

== Career ==
He started in the Top 14 for the first time in February 2022, for Union Bordeaux Bègles against Racing 92. In his debut season, he made seven appearances in the Top 14, including one further starts, and two matches in the European Rugby Champions Cup, including one start.

Playing for Bordeaux, he produced notable performances in the European Champions Cup during the 2023-24 season. This included scoring a try in a 45-12 win over Saracens to reach the quarter finals.
