= Yoan Tanga =

France international rugby union player (born 1996)

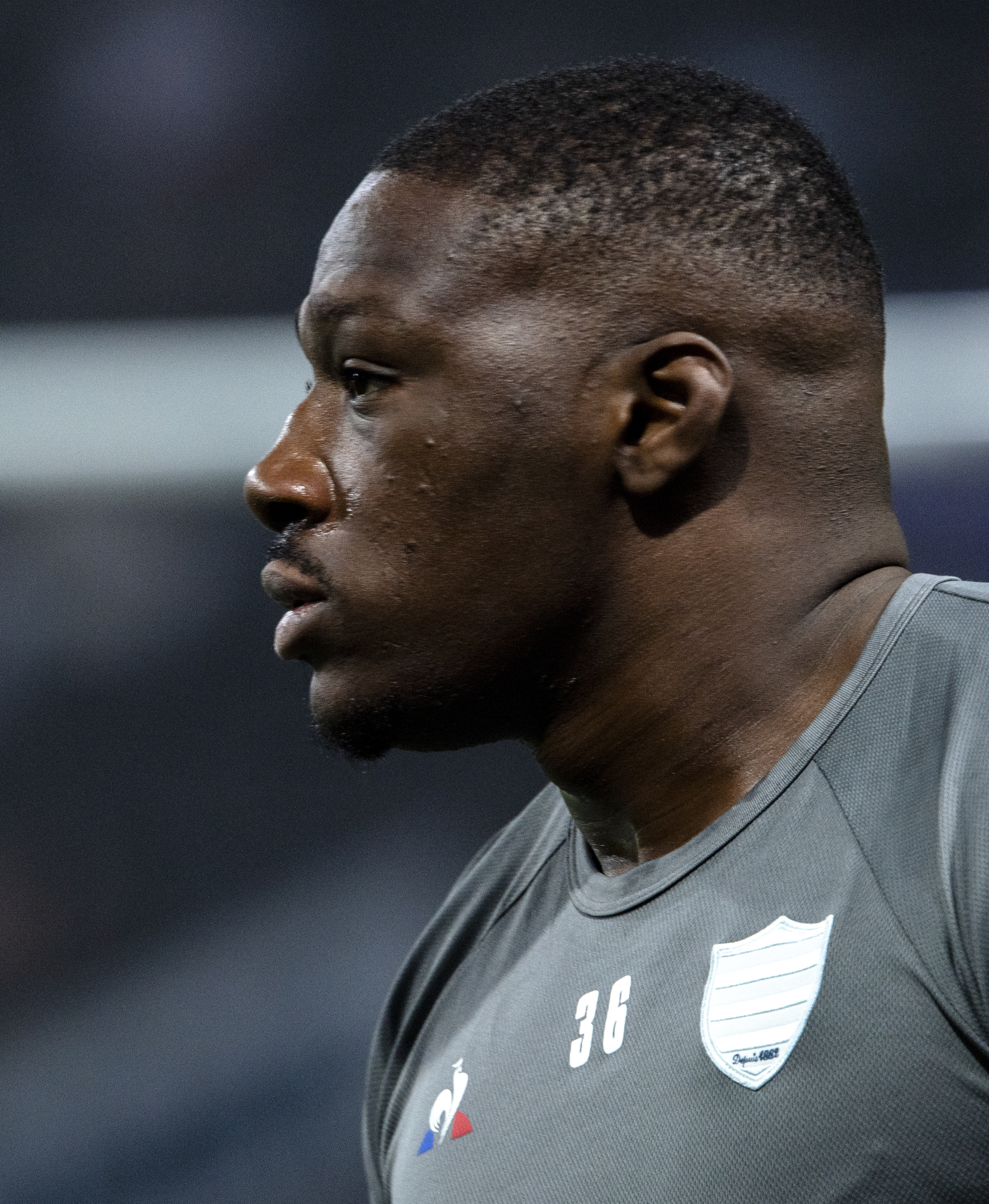
- Tanga representing Racing 92 during the Top 14
- Full name: Yoan Tanga Mangene
- Born: 29 November 1996 (age 29) Bondy, France
- Height: 1.85 m (6 ft 1 in)
- Weight: 108 kg (238 lb; 17 st 0 lb)

Rugby union career
- Position(s): Number 8, Flanker
- Current team: La Rochelle
Senior career
Years	Team	Apps	(Points)
2017–2019	Agen	46	(35)
2019–2022	Racing 92	66	(65)
2022–2024	La Rochelle	50	(30)
2024-present	Stade Français		
- Correct as of 13 June 2023
International career
Years	Team	Apps	(Points)
2022–	France	3	(0)
- Correct as of 5 August 2023

Yoan Tanga Mangene (born 29 November 1996) is a French professional rugby union player. He plays number eight and centre for Top 14 club Stade Français and the France national team.

== Professional career ==
He was first selected for the French national rugby team in January 2022, for the following Six Nations tournament.
