= Matthis Lebel =

France international rugby union player

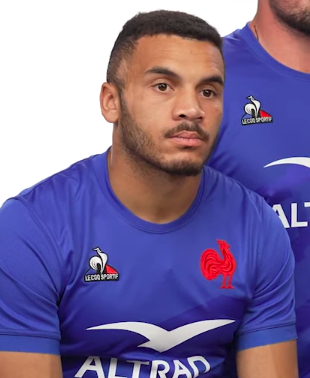
- Lebel representing France in 2022
- Born: 25 March 1999 (age 27) Toulouse, France
- Height: 1.84 m (6 ft 0 in)
- Weight: 84 kg (185 lb; 13 st 3 lb)

Rugby union career
- Position(s): Wing, Fullback
- Current team: Toulouse
Senior career
Years	Team	Apps	(Points)
2018–	Toulouse	124	(280)
- Correct as of 26 May 2024
International career
Years	Team	Apps	(Points)
2018–2019	France U20	14	(10)
2021–	France	6	(10)
- Correct as of 25 February 2026

Matthis Lebel (born 25 March 1999) is a French professional rugby union player who plays as a wing for Top 14 club Toulouse and the France national team. He scored the winning try for Toulouse vs Leinster Rugby in the Investec Champions Cup final 23-24.

== Career statistics ==
=== List of international tries ===
International tries
No.	Date	Venue	Opponent	Score	Result	Competition
1	2 July 2022	Toyota Stadium, Toyota, Japan	Japan	13–18	23–42	2022 Japan test series
2	9 July 2022	National Stadium, Tokyo, Japan	Japan	0–5	15–20	2022 Japan test series

== Honours ==
Toulouse

- 2× European Rugby Champions Cup: 2021, 2024
- 3× Top 14: 2019, 2021, 2023

France

- 1× Six Nations Championship: 2022

France U20

- 2× World Rugby Under 20 Championship: 2018, 2019
- 1× Six Nations Under 20s Championship: 2018
