= 2022 mid-year rugby union tests =

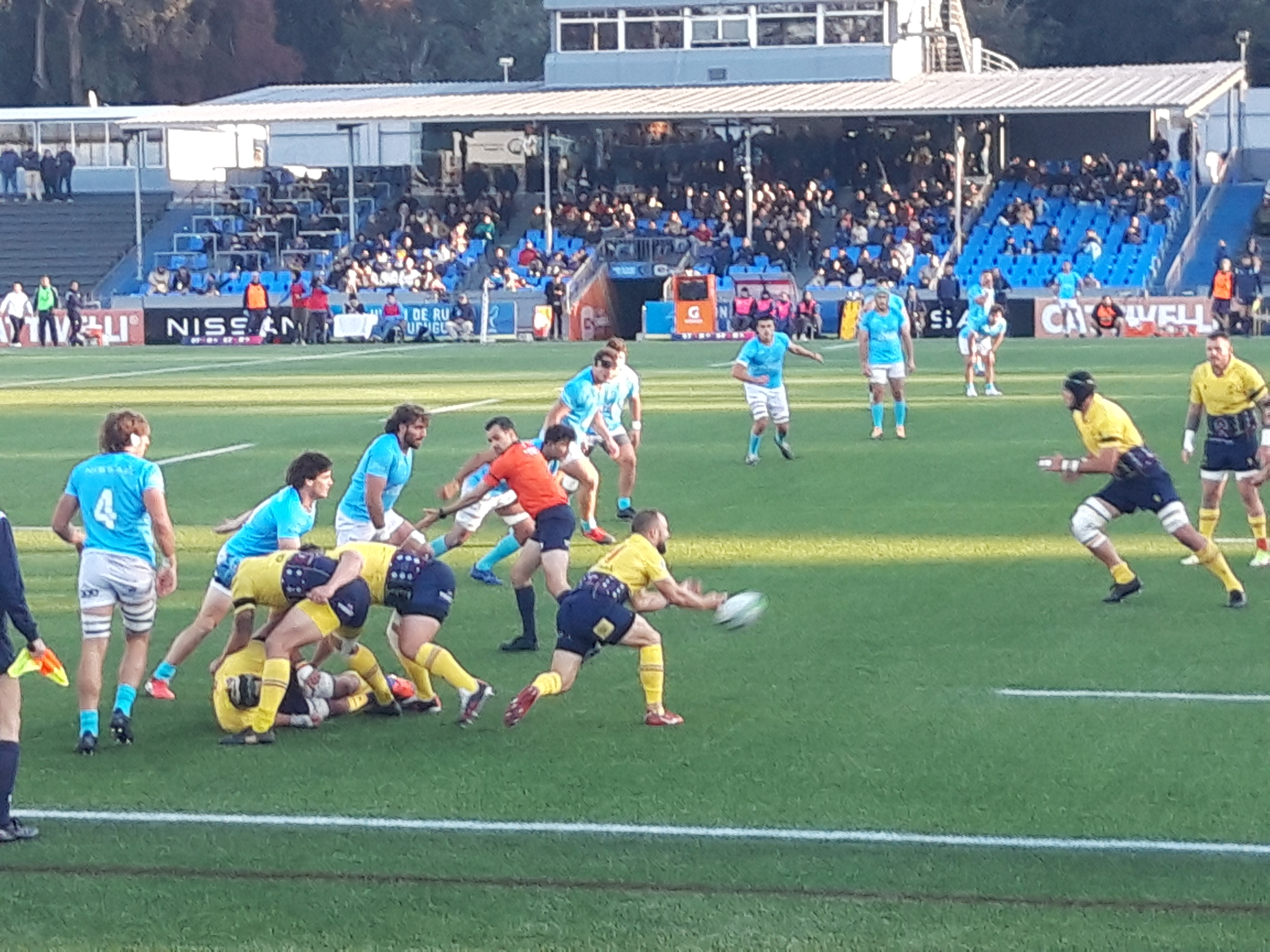
Uruguay vs Romania

The 2022 mid-year rugby union internationals (also known as the summer internationals in the Northern Hemisphere) were international rugby union matches that were mostly played in the Southern Hemisphere during the July international window. For the first time since 2018 all leading Northern Hemisphere teams toured, following a cancelled calendar in 2020 and a largely reversed calendar in 2021.

South Africa hosted Wales for a first three-test series, Wales travelling to South Africa for the first time since 2014; this was the first three-test series between the two sides. Also playing a first three-test series against their opposition were Scotland, who played Argentina in what was Argentina's first set of home games since 2019. New Zealand hosted Ireland for their first three-test series since 2012. Ireland also played two matches against the Māori All Blacks. France travelled to Japan for a two-test series, which was the first official tour of Japan for Les Bleus, having only ever toured as an XV side in 1984. Italy embarked on a tour of Europe, playing away to Portugal, Romania and Georgia, teams they had not played outside a competition environment since 2004. It was also Portugal's first match against a Six Nations country since the 2007 Rugby World Cup.

Several Tier-2 nations also toured, with Uruguay travelling to Japan for a two-test series before later hosting Romania for a two-test series. Spain and Belgium travelled to Canada, with Belgium touring outside a competition for the first time since playing Hong Kong in 2013.

With some teams still involved in the 2023 Rugby World Cup qualifying process, typical touring / hosting sides played one-off matches in preparation for their respective Qualification matches; Chile hosted an historic match against Scotland in an uncapped 'A' match, Netherlands hosted Zimbabwe, Italy A played Namibia and the United States hosted the French Barbarians.

== Series ==
Event	Result	Victor
Australia v England test series	1–2	England
New Zealand v Ireland test series	1–2	Ireland
Japan v Uruguay test series	2–0	Japan
Japan v France test series	0–2	France
Māori All Blacks v Ireland series	1–1	Drawn
Argentina v Scotland test series	2–1	Argentina
Uruguay v Romania test series	1–1	Drawn
South Africa v Wales test series	2–1	South Africa

=== Tours ===
Team	Tour	Opponents
Argentina XV	Europe (Tier II)	Georgia (Won) – Portugal (Won)
Italy	Europe (Tier II)	Portugal (Won) – Romania (Won) – Georgia (Lost)
Italy A	Southern Africa	Namibia (Won) – Currie Cup XV (Lost)

== Fixtures ==
=== 4 June ===
4 June 2022
16:00 CAT (UTC+02)

Namibia	12–47	(South Africa) Blue Bulls
Try: Nortjé 19' m Klim 50' c Con: Brandt (1/1) 51'	Report	Try: Labuschagne (2) 1' c, 46' m Van der Linde 14' c Kriel 34' c Penalty try 40'; De Witt 59' c Manuel 61' c Con: Mostert (5/6) 2', 15', 32', 60', 62'

Hage Geingob Rugby Stadium, Windhoek
Referee: Oscar Lambert (Namibia)

=== 10 June ===
10 June 2022
20:00 CEST (UTC+02)

Emerging Italy	50–5	Netherlands
Try: Gesi (2) 8' c, 41' m Di Bartolomeo 19' m Izekor 28' c Ruggeri (3) 35' c, 50' m, 71' c Ribaldi 19' c Con: Albanese (4/7) 9', 30', 35', 42'; Gesi (1/1) 72'	Report	Try: Hop 58' m

Stadio Mario Battaglini, Rovigo
Referee: Federico Vedovelli (Italy)

Team details

FB	15	Michelangelo Biondelli	(substituted off) 70'
RW	14	Edoardo Mastrandrea
OC	13	Andrea De Masi	(substituted off) 70'
IC	12	Marco Broggin
LW	11	Simone Gesi
FH	10	Luca Zini
SH	9	Manfredi Albanese	(substituted off) 53'
N8	8	Davide Ruggeri (c)
OF	7	Alessandro Izekor	(substituted off) 50'
BF	6	Emanuele Ghigo
RL	5	Nathaniel Panozzo
LL	4	Cristian Stoian	(substituted off) 49'
TP	3	Muhamed Hasa	(substituted off) 49'	(substituted on) 76'
HK	2	Tommaso Di Bartolomeo	(substituted off) 49'
LP	1	Mirco Spagnolo	(substituted off) 49'
Replacements:
HK	16	Giampietro Ribaldi	(substituted on) 49'
PR	17	Emanuele Leccioli	(substituted on) 49'
PR	18	Entienne Swanepoel	(substituted on) 49'	(substituted off) 76'
LK	19	Nicola Piantella	(substituted on) 49'
FL	20	Matteo Meggiato	(substituted on) 50'
FB	21	Lorenzo Citton	(substituted on) 53'
CE	22	Matteo Moscardi	(substituted on) 70'
WG	23	Luca Borin	(substituted on) 70'
Coach:
(Italy) Alessandro Troncon

FB	15	Te Hauora Campbell
RW	14	Daan van der Avoird
OC	13	Bart Wierenga
IC	12	David Weersma		(substituted off) 55'
LW	11	Jordy Hop
FH	10	Mees van Oord
SH	9	Hugo Schöller		(substituted off) 49'
N8	8	Christopher Raymond
OF	7	Spike Salman
BF	6	Louis Bruinsma		(substituted off) 65'
RL	5	Monty Leverstein	(yellow card) 34' to 44'
LL	4	Dennis van Dijken		(substituted off) 50'
TP	3	Juriaan Jorna		(substituted off) 52'
HK	2	Roberto Warmerdam		(substituted off) 50'
LP	1	Lodi Buijs		(substituted off) 64'
Replacements:
HK	16	Odin Ruijgrok		(substituted on) 50'
PR	17	Quermy Warmerdam		(substituted on) 64'
PR	18	Evan Bloemers		(substituted on) 52'
LK	19	Niels Roelfsema		(substituted on) 50'
FL	20	Dirk Wierenga		(substituted on) 65'
SH	21	Aublix Tahwa		(substituted on) 49'
FH	22	Rik van Balkom
CE	23	Daily Limmen		(substituted on) 55'
Coach:
(South Africa) Dick Muir

Assistant referees:
Alex Frasson (Italy)
Filippo Russo (Italy)
Television match official:
Alan Falzone (Italy)

=== 18/19 June ===
18 June 2022
15:00 JST (UTC+09)

Japan	34–15	Uruguay
Try: Nezuka 10' m Tatafu 40' c Horikoshi 44' c Hino (2) 63' c, 72' m Con: Tamura (3/5) 40+1', 45', 64'; Pen: Tamura (1/1) 18'	Report	Try: Magno 58' m Ardao 76' c Con: F. Echeverry (1/2) 76'; Pen: F. Echeverry (1/1) 35'

Chichibunomiya Rugby Stadium, Tokyo
Attendance: 14,448
Referee: Jordan Way (Australia)

Team details

FB	15	Seiya Ozaki	(yellow card) 20' to 30'	(substituted off) 60'
RW	14	Koki Takeyama
OC	13	Shane Gates
IC	12	Timothy Lafaele		(substituted off) 69'
LW	11	Koga Nezuka
FH	10	Yu Tamura (c)
SH	9	Takahiro Ogawa		(substituted off) 60'
N8	8	Tevita Tatafu
OF	7	Hiroki Yamamoto
BF	6	Koji Iino		(substituted off) 60'
RL	5	Yuya Odo
LL	4	Wimpie van der Walt		(substituted off) 68'
TP	3	Shunsuke Asaoka		(substituted off) 60'
HK	2	Kosuke Horikoshi		(substituted off) 59'
LP	1	Shogo Miura		(substituted off) 60'
Replacements:
HK	16	Takeshi Hino		(substituted on) 59'
PR	17	Kota Kaishi		(substituted on) 60'
PR	18	Syuhei Takeuchi		(substituted on) 60'
LK	19	Daichi Akiyama		(substituted on) 68'
FL	20	Sione Lavemai		(substituted on) 60'
SH	21	Kaito Shigeno		(substituted on) 60'
FH	22	Harumichi Tatekawa		(substituted on) 69'
FB	23	Taira Main		(substituted on) 60'
Coach:
(New Zealand) Jamie Joseph

FB	15	Rodrigo Silva		(substituted off) 60'
RW	14	Mateo Viñals
OC	13	Nicolás Freitas
IC	12	Andrés Vilaseca (c)
LW	11	Baltazar Amaya		(substituted off) 65'
FH	10	Felipe Echeverry
SH	9	Tomás Inciarte		(substituted off) 73'
N8	8	Manuel Ardao
OF	7	Santiago Civetta
BF	6	Lucas Bianchi	(yellow card) 16' to 26'	(substituted off) 65'
RL	5	Carlos Deus		(substituted off) 50'
LL	4	Eric Dosantos
TP	3	Ignacio Péculo		(substituted off) 52'
HK	2	Guillermo Pujadas		(substituted off) 69'
LP	1	Mateo Perillo		(substituted off) 45'
Replacements:
HK	16	Emiliano Faccenini		(substituted on) 69'
PR	17	Matías Benítez		(substituted on) 52'
PR	18	Juan Echeverría		(substituted on) 45'
LK	19	Diego Magno		(substituted on) 50'
LK	20	Tomás Etcheverry		(substituted on) 65'
SH	21	Santiago Álvarez		(substituted on) 73'
CE	22	Juan Manuel Alonso		(substituted on) 65'
FB	23	Jose Iruleguy		(substituted on) 69'
Coach:
(Argentina) Esteban Meneses

Assistant referees:
Mike Fraser (New Zealand)
Graham Cooper (Australia)
Television match official:
Chris Hart (New Zealand)

Notes:

- Daichi Akiyama, Shunsuke Asaoka, Koji Iino, Koga Nezuka, Kota Kaishi, Sione Lavemai, Taira Main, Syuhei Takeuchi, Koki Takeyama (all Japan), Santiago Álvarez, Lucas Bianchi, Carlos Deus, Tomás Etcheverry and Emiliano Faccenini (all Uruguay) made their international debuts.

19 June 2022
15:00 BST (UTC+01)

England	21–52	Barbarians
Try: Cokanasiga 35' m May 50' m Smith 59' m Pen: Smith (2/3) 16', 34'	Report	Try: Penalty try 17'; Ollivon 23' c Penaud (2) 37' m, 54' m Couilloud 45' c Carbonel 66' c Spring 73' c Hastoy 78' c Con: Hastoy (2/4) 24', 67'; Kruis (3/3) 46', 74', 79'

Twickenham Stadium, London
Attendance: 51,385
Referee: Andrea Piardi (Italy)

Team details

FB	15	Tommy Freeman
RW	14	Joe Cokanasiga		(substituted off) 65'
OC	13	Joe Marchant		(substituted off) 55'
IC	12	Mark Atkinson
LW	11	Jonny May	(yellow card) 17' to 27'
FH	10	Marcus Smith
SH	9	Harry Randall		(substituted off) 44'
N8	8	Callum Chick		(substituted off) 44'
OF	7	Sam Underhill		(substituted off) 51'
BF	6	Tom Curry (c)
RL	5	Jonny Hill
LL	4	Charlie Ewels
TP	3	Will Collier		(substituted off) 27'	(substituted on) 35'	(substituted off) 61'
HK	2	Jack Walker		(substituted off) 55'
LP	1	Bevan Rodd
Replacements:
HK	16	Jack Singleton		(substituted on) 55'
PR	17	Will Goodrick-Clarke				(substituted on) 61'
PR	18	Patrick Schickerling		(substituted on) 27'	(substituted off) 35'
LK	19	Courtney Lawes		(substituted on) 51'
FL	20	Jack Willis		(substituted on) 44'
SH	21	Danny Care		(substituted on) 44'
FH	22	Orlando Bailey		(substituted on) 65'
WG	23	Jack Nowell		(substituted on) 55'
Coach:
(Australia) Eddie Jones

FB	15	(France) Max Spring
RW	14	(France) Damian Penaud
OC	13	(France) Virimi Vakatawa		(substituted off) 40'
IC	12	(Fiji) Levani Botia		(substituted off) 63'
LW	11	(Georgia (country)) Davit Niniashvili
FH	10	(France) Antoine Hastoy
SH	9	(France) Baptiste Couilloud		(substituted off) 52'
N8	8	(France) Yoan Tanga
OF	7	(France) Charles Ollivon (c)		(substituted off) 52'
BF	6	(France) Dylan Cretin
RL	5	(Australia) Will Skelton	(red card) 35'
LL	4	(England) George Kruis
TP	3	(Georgia (country)) Beka Gigashvili		(substituted off) 52'
HK	2	(France) Pierre Bourgarit		(substituted off) 52'
LP	1	(France) Jean-Baptiste Gros		(substituted off) 52'
Replacements:
PR	16	(France) Dany Priso		(substituted on) 52'
HK	17	(France) Christopher Tolofua		(substituted on) 52'
PR	18	(France) Sipili Falatea		(substituted on) 52'
LK	19	(France) Thomas Lavault		(substituted on) 52'
SH	20	(France) Nolann Le Garrec		(substituted on) 52'
FH	21	(France) Louis Carbonel		(substituted on) 63'
FL	22	(France) Sekou Macalou			(substituted on) 52'
CE	23	(France) Tani Vili		(substituted on) 40'	(substituted off) 52'
Coach:
(France) Fabien Galthié

Player of the Match:
(England) George Kruis (Barbarians)

Assistant referees:
Mike Adamson (Scotland)
Gianluca Gnecchi (Italy)
Television match official:
Ben Whitehouse (Wales)

Notes:

- Alex Dombrandt (England) had been named to start but withdrew ahead of the game due to injury and was replaced by Callum Chick.
- This is the Barbarians' biggest winning margin over England, surpassing the 20-point difference set in 2004.
- Will Skelton became the first player to be red-carded while playing for the Barbarians.

=== 24 June ===
24 June 2022
16:00 SAST (UTC+02)

Namibia	21–43	Italy A
Try: Venter 28' c Izaacs 47' c Nortjé 66' c Con: Van der Berg (3/3) 29', 48', 68'	Report	Try: Ruggeri 3' m Bianchi 15' c Ribaldi (2) 19' m, 30' m Bellini 44' c Lucchin 57' c Izekor 62' c Con: Canna (3/6) 16', 45', 58'; Di Marco (1/1) 63'

City Park, Athlone, Cape Town, South Africa
Referee: Aimee Barrett-Theron (South Africa)

=== 25 June ===
25 June 2022
15:00 JST (UTC+09)

Japan	43–7	Uruguay
Try: Sakate (2) 5' m, 50' m Dylan Riley 38' m Van den Heever 55' m Penalty try 61'; Kajimura 63' c Con: Lee Seung-sin (1/1) 64'; Pen: Yamasawa (3/3) 9', 16', 23'	Report	Try: Ardao 74' c Con: Echeverry (1/1) 75'

Mikuni World Stadium Kitakyushu, Fukuoka
Attendance: 11,664
Referee: Graham Cooper (Australia)

Team details

FB	15	Ryuji Noguchi
RW	14	Gerhard van den Heever
OC	13	Dylan Riley
IC	12	Yusuke Kajimura
LW	11	Siosaia Fifita		(substituted off) 65'
FH	10	Takuya Yamasawa		(substituted off) 62'
SH	9	Naoto Saito		(substituted off) 62'
N8	8	Faulua Makisi
OF	7	Ben Gunter		(substituted off) 57'
BF	6	Michael Leitch
RL	5	Warner Dearns		(substituted off) 50'
LL	4	Jack Cornelsen
TP	3	Yusuke Kizu		(substituted off) 50'
HK	2	Atsushi Sakate (c)		(substituted off) 62'
LP	1	Keita Inagaki	(yellow card) 69' to 79'			(substituted off) 79'
Replacements:
HK	16	Shota Horie		(substituted on) 62'
PR	17	Shogo Miura			(substituted on) 71'
PR	18	Asaeli Ai Valu		(substituted on) 50'
LK	19	Sanaila Waqa		(substituted on) 50'
FL	20	Masato Furukawa		(substituted on) 57'
SH	21	Daiki Nakajima		(substituted on) 62'
FH	22	Lee Seung-sin		(substituted on) 62'
CE	23	Shogo Nakano		(substituted on) 65'	(substituted off) 71'	(substituted on) 79'
Coach:
(New Zealand) Jamie Joseph

FB	15	Rodrigo Silva
RW	14	Juan Manuel Alonso		(substituted off) 50'
OC	13	Nicolás Freitas		(substituted off) 62'
IC	12	Andrés Vilaseca (c)
LW	11	Bautista Basso
FH	10	Felipe Echeverry
SH	9	Tomás Inciarte		(substituted off) 70'
N8	8	Manuel Ardao
OF	7	Santiago Civetta	(yellow card) 61' to 71'
BF	6	Lucas Bianchi		(substituted off) 57'
RL	5	Diego Magno		(substituted off) 70'
LL	4	Eric Dosantos
TP	3	Ignacio Péculo		(substituted off) 70'
HK	2	Guillermo Pujadas		(substituted off) 70'
LP	1	Juan Echeverría		(substituted off) 57'
Replacements:
HK	16	Emiliano Faccenini		(substituted on) 70'
PR	17	Matías Benítez		(substituted on) 57'
PR	18	Mathías Franco		(substituted on) 70'
LK	19	Tomás Etcheverry		(substituted on) 70'
FL	20	Franco Lamanna		(substituted on) 57'
SH	21	Santiago Álvarez		(substituted on) 70'
WG	22	Mateo Viñals		(substituted on) 50'
WG	23	Baltazar Amaya		(substituted on) 62'
Coach:
(Argentina) Esteban Meneses

Assistant referees:
Mike Fraser (New Zealand)
Reuben Keane (Australia)
Television match official:
Oli Kellett (Australia)

Notes:

- Yukio Morikawa (Japan) had been named on the bench, but withdrew ahead of the game and was replaced by Shogo Miura.
- Lee Seung-sin, Gerhard van den Heever, Sanaila Waqa (all Japan), Bautista Basso and Matías Franco (both Uruguay) made their international debuts.

25 June 2022
16:30 CEST (UTC+02)

Netherlands	7–30	Zimbabwe
Try: Stone 34' c Con: Van Oord 36'	Report	Try: Chieza 12' c McNab 28' m Musingwini 55' c Larkan 70' m Con: Mudariki (2/3) 14', 56'; Pen: Musingwini (2/2) 18', 40'

NRCA Stadium, Amsterdam
Referee: Killian O'Brien (Germany)

Notes:

- This is the first time that these two teams have played each other.
- Zimbabwe play a friendly test match in Europe for the first time since 1989, when they played Italy in Treviso.

25 June 2022
17:00 WET (UTC+0)

Portugal	31–38	Italy
Try: Penalty try 16'; Marta (2) 38' c, 66' c Appleton 42' c Con: Marques (3/3) 39', 43', 67'; Pen: Marques (1/1) 6'	Report	Try: Fusco 25' m Marin 31' m Padovani 46' c Lucchesi 52' c Traorè 73' c Penalty try 79'; Con: Da Re (2/4) 48', 53'; Padovani (1/1) 74'

Estádio do Restelo, Lisbon
Attendance: 5,100
Referee: Hollie Davidson (Scotland)

Team details

FB	15	Nuno Sousa Guedes
RW	14	Vincent Pinto		(substituted off) 64'
OC	13	José Lima		(substituted off) 79'
IC	12	Tomás Appleton (c)
LW	11	Rodrigo Marta	(yellow card) 74'
FH	10	Jerónimo Portela
SH	9	Samuel Marques
N8	8	Rafael Simões
OF	7	Thibault de Freitas		(substituted off) 59'
BF	6	João Granate		(substituted off) 75'
RL	5	José Madeira
LL	4	Steevy Cerqueira
TP	3	Diogo Hasse Ferreira		(substituted off) 64'
HK	2	Mike Tadjer		(substituted off) 71'
LP	1	Francisco Fernandes		(substituted off) 67'
Replacements:
PR	16	David Costa		(substituted on) 67'
HK	17	Nuno Mascarenhas		(substituted on) 71'
PR	18	António Prim		(substituted on) 64'
LK	19	Duarte Torgal		(substituted on) 59'
FL	20	José Rebelo de Andrade	(yellow card) 80'	(substituted on) 75'
SH	21	Duarte Azevedo
WG	22	Raffaele Storti		(substituted on) 64'
FB	23	Manuel Cardoso Pinto		(substituted on) 79'
Coach:
(France) Patrice Lagisquet

FB	15	Ange Capuozzo
RW	14	Jacopo Trulla
OC	13	Ignacio Brex
IC	12	Leonardo Marin	(yellow card) 16' to 26'	(substituted off) 68'
LW	11	Edoardo Padovani
FH	10	Giacomo Da Re	(yellow card) 65' to 75'
SH	9	Alessandro Fusco		(substituted off) 58'
N8	8	Renato Giammarioli		(substituted off) 47'
OF	7	Michele Lamaro (c)
BF	6	Giovanni Pettinelli
RL	5	Andrea Zambonin		(substituted off) 44'
LL	4	David Sisi		(substituted off) 54'
TP	3	Simone Ferrari		(substituted off) 54'
HK	2	Hame Faiva		(substituted off) 54'
LP	1	Danilo Fischetti		(substituted off) 70'
Replacements:
HK	16	Gianmarco Lucchesi		(substituted on) 54'
PR	17	Cherif Traorè		(substituted on) 70'
PR	18	Ion Neculai		(substituted on) 54'
LK	19	Marco Fuser		(substituted on) 54'
LK	20	Federico Ruzza		(substituted on) 44'
FL	21	Manuel Zuliani		(substituted on) 47'
SH	22	Manfredi Albanese		(substituted on) 58'
CE	23	Marco Zanon		(substituted on) 68'
Coach:
(New Zealand) Kieran Crowley

Player of the Match:
Rodrigo Marta (Portugal)

Assistant referees:
Sara Cox (England)
Aurélie Groizeleau (France)
Television match official:
Claire Hodnett (England)

Notes:

- Manfredi Albanese, Giacomo Da Re and Ion Neculai (all Italy) made their international debuts.
- This is the first time since 1996 that Portugal has hosted a Tier 1 nation in a full test match.
- This was the first time an all-female officiating team was appointed to a men's international, and for a female official to officiate as referee a men's Six Nations team.

25 June 2022
21:00 CEST (UTC+02)

Spain	7–26	Barbarians
Try: Aboitiz 67' c Con: Vinuesa (1/1) 69'	Report	Try: Byrne 21' c Smith (2) 38' c, 49' c Lane 68' m Con: Smith (1/2) 22'; Wood (2/2) 39', 50'

El Molinón, Gijón
Attendance: 5,000
Referee: Iñigo Atorrasagasti (Spain)

Team details

FB	15	J. W. Bell
RW	14	Martín Alonso
OC	13	Jordi Jorba
IC	12	Iñaki Mateu
LW	11	Gauthier Minguillon
FH	10	Gonzalo Vinuesa
SH	9	Tomás Munilla
N8	8	Guillermo Moretón
OF	7	Brice Ferrer
BF	6	Michael Hogg
RL	5	Imanol Urraza
LL	4	Álex Suarez
TP	3	Jon Zabala (c)
HK	2	Santiago Ovejero
LP	1	Thierry Futeu
Replacements:
PR	16	Fernando López
HK	17	Vicente del Hoyo
PR	18	Bittor Aboitiz
FL	19	Marc Sánchez
N8	20	Afa Tauli
SH	21	Facundo Munilla
FH	22	Bautista Güemes
FB	23	Federico Casteglioni
Coach:
(Spain) Santiago Santos

FB	15	(Samoa) Tim Nanai-Williams
RW	14	(Wales) Owen Lane
OC	13	(Samoa) Rey Lee-Lo
IC	12	(Wales) Hadleigh Parkes (c)
LW	11	(Ireland) Adam Byrne
FH	10	(South Africa) Rhyno Smith
SH	9	(France) Sébastien Bézy
N8	8	(New Zealand) Abraham Papali'i
OF	7	(Wales) James Botham
BF	6	(England) Tom Wood
RL	5	(Tonga) Steve Mafi
LL	4	(Ireland) Devin Toner
TP	3	(New Zealand) Charlie Faumuina
HK	2	(Wales) Scott Baldwin
LP	1	(Ireland) Ed Byrne
Replacements:
PR	16	(Wales) Kirby Myhill
HK	17	(Scotland) Allan Dell
PR	18	(Wales) Scott Andrews
LK	19	(Samoa) Joe Tekori
FL	20	(Scotland) Rob Harley
N8	21	(Wales) Dan Baker
SH	22	(France) Mathis Galthié
FB	23	(Samoa) Ahsee Tuala
Coach:
(Australia) John Mulvihill

Assistant referees:
David Castro (Spain)
Belarmino Álvarez (Spain)

25 June 2022
16:00 CLT (UTC-04)

Chile	5–45	Scotland A
Try: Edwards 78' m	Report	Try: Hoyland (3) 12' c, 28' c, 45' m Horne (2) 17' c, 22' c McLean 79' m Price 80' c Con: Thompson (4/5) 13', 17', 24', 29'; Kinghorn (1/2) 80+2'

Estadio Santa Laura-Universidad SEK, Santiago
Attendance: 8,213
Referee: Adam Jones (Wales)

Team details

FB	15	Francisco Urroz
RW	14	Nicolas Garafulic
OC	13	Pablo Casas
IC	12	Iñaki Ayarza	(substituted off) 48'
LW	11	Matías Garafulic
FH	10	Rodrigo Fernández (c)
SH	9	Marcelo Torrealba	(substituted off) 54'
N8	8	Alfonso Escobar	(substituted off) 48'
OF	7	Ignacio Silva	(substituted off) 40'
BF	6	Santiago Edwards
RL	5	Clemente Saavedra	(substituted off) 11'
LL	4	Santiago Pedrero
TP	3	Vittorio Lastra	(substituted off) 59'
HK	2	Tomás Dussaillant	(substituted off) 25'
LP	1	Javier Carrasco	(substituted off) 40'
Replacements:
HK	16	Diego Escobar	(substituted on) 25'
PR	17	Salvador Lues	(substituted on) 40'
PR	18	Iñaki Gurruchaga	(substituted on) 59'
LK	19	Thomas Orchard	(substituted on) 11'
FL	20	Raimundo Martínez	(substituted on) 40'
SH	21	José Larenas	(substituted on) 48'
FH	22	Santiago Videla	(substituted on) 48'
CE	23	Nicolás Herreros	(substituted on) 54'
Coach:
(Uruguay) Pablo Lemoine

FB	15	Ollie Smith
RW	14	Damien Hoyland
OC	13	Matt Currie	(substituted off) 68'
IC	12	Sione Tuipulotu
LW	11	Rufus McLean
FH	10	Ross Thompson	(substituted off) 68'
SH	9	George Horne	(substituted off) 68'
N8	8	Matt Fagerson	(substituted off) 54'
OF	7	Luke Crosbie (c)
BF	6	Ben Muncaster
RL	5	Scott Cummings	(substituted off) 54'
LL	4	Jamie Hodgson
TP	3	Javan Sebastian	(substituted off) 58'
HK	2	Dave Cherry	(substituted off) 54'
LP	1	Jamie Bhatti	(substituted off) 68'
Replacements:
HK	16	Johnny Matthews	(substituted on) 54'
PR	17	Pierre Schoeman	(substituted on) 68'
PR	18	Murphy Walker	(substituted on) 58'
LK	19	Glen Young	(substituted on) 54'
FL	20	Magnus Bradbury	(substituted on) 54'
SH	21	Ali Price	(substituted on) 68'
FH	22	Blair Kinghorn	(substituted on) 68'
CE	23	Mark Bennett	(substituted on) 68'
Coach:
(Scotland) Gregor Townsend

Assistant referees:
Francisco Gonzalez (Uruguay)
Talal Chaudhry (Canada)
Television match official:
Lucas Galan (Argentina)

Notes:

- Despite not being a full capped test-match, this was the first time these two teams have played each other.
- This is the first time that Chile has hosted a Tier 1 nation (outside of any competition) since hosting a France XV side in 2005.

=== 29 June ===
29 June 2022
19:05 NZST (UTC+12)

Māori All Blacks	32–17	Ireland
Try: Sullivan 16' m Stevenson 28' c Weber 34' c Grace 40' c Con: Ioane (3/4) 29', 35', 40'; Pen: Ioane (2/3) 7', 27'	Report	Try: Aki 20' c Coombes 66' c Con: Frawley (2/2) 20', 67'; Pen: Frawley (1/1) 4'

Waikato Stadium, Hamilton
Attendance: 9,253
Referee: Wayne Barnes (England)

Team details

FB	15	Zarn Sullivan
RW	14	Shaun Stevenson	(substituted off) 49'
OC	13	Billy Proctor
IC	12	Rameka Poihipi
LW	11	Connor Garden-Bachop
FH	10	Josh Ioane	(substituted off) 68'
SH	9	Brad Weber (c)	(substituted off) 49'
N8	8	Cullen Grace
OF	7	Billy Harmon
BF	6	Cameron Suafoa	(substituted off) 68'
RL	5	Isaia Walker-Leawere
LL	4	Josh Dickson	(substituted off) 61'
TP	3	Tyrel Lomax	(substituted off) 53'
HK	2	Kurt Eklund	(substituted off) 68'
LP	1	Ollie Norris	(substituted off) 61'
Replacements:
HK	16	Tyrone Thompson	(substituted on) 68'
PR	17	Tamaiti Williams	(substituted on) 61'
PR	18	Jermaine Ainsley	(substituted on) 53'
LK	19	Manaaki Selby-Rickit	(substituted on) 61'
FL	20	TK Howden	(substituted on) 68'
SH	21	TJ Perenara	(substituted on) 49'
FH	22	Ruben Love	(substituted on) 68'
CE	23	Bailyn Sullivan	(substituted on) 49'
Coach:
(New Zealand) Clayton McMillan

FB	15Luke Fitzgerald
RW	14	Jordan Larmour
OC	13	James Hume	(substituted off) 49'
IC	12	Bundee Aki (c)
LW	11	Keith Earls
FH	10	Ciarán Frawley
SH	9	Craig Casey
N8	8	Gavin Coombes	(substituted off) 79'
OF	7 David Wallace
BF	6	Cian Prendergast
RL	5	Joe McCarthy
LL	4	Kieran Treadwell	(substituted off) 51'
TP	3	Tom O'Toole
HK	2	Dave Heffernan	(substituted off) 51'
LP	1	Jeremy Loughman	(substituted off) 1'	(substituted on) 13'	(substituted off) 40'
Replacements:
HK	16	Niall Scannell	(substituted on) 51'
PR	17	Cian Healy	(substituted on) 1'	(substituted off) 13'	(substituted on) 40'	(substituted off) 69'
PR	18	Finlay Bealham				(substituted on) 69'
LK	19	Ryan Baird	(substituted on) 51'
N8	20	Jack Conan	(substituted on) 79'
SH	21	Conor Murray
FH	22	Joey Carbery	(substituted on) 60'
CE	23	Michael Lowry	(substituted on) 49'
Coach:
(England) Andy Farrell

Assistant referees:
Jordan Way (Australia)
Graham Cooper (Australia)
Television match official:
Marius van der Westhuizen (South Africa)

=== 1 July ===
1 July 2022
21:00 EEST (UTC+03)

Romania	13–45	Italy
Try: Savin 79' c Con: Bucur (1/1) 80'; Pen: Vlaicu (2/3) 10', 24'	Report	Try: Menoncello (2) 15' m, 57' m Allan 38' c Cannone 40+2' c A Garbisi 45' c Zanon 61' c Nicotera 69' c Con: Allan (5/7) 39', 40+3', 46', 62', 71'

Stadionul Arcul de Triumf, Bucharest
Referee: Luke Pearce (England)

Team details

FB	15	Marius Simionescu
RW	14	Mihai Lămboiu
OC	13	Taylor Gontineac		(substituted off) 61'
IC	12	Hinckley Vaovasa		(substituted off) 58'
LW	11	Adrian Apostol
FH	10	Florin Vlaicu		(substituted off) 49'
SH	9	Gabriel Rupanu		(substituted off) 49'
N8	8	Mihai Macovei (c)
BF	7	Dragoș Ser		(substituted off) 42'
OF	6	Vlad Neculau	(red card) 71'
RL	5	Marius Antonescu
LL	4	Marius Iftimiciuc
TP	3	Victor Leon		(substituted off) 45'
HK	2	Tudor Butnariu		(substituted off) 44'
LP	1	Vasile Bălan		(substituted off) 45'
Replacements:
HK	16	Iulian Harțig		(substituted on) 44'
PR	17	Alexandru Savin		(substituted on) 45'
PR	18	Alexandru Gordaș		(substituted on) 45'
LK	19	Andrei Toader		(substituted on) 61'
FL	20	Kamil Sobota		(substituted on) 42'
SH	21	Florin Surugiu		(substituted on) 59'
CE	22	Alexandru Bucur		(substituted on) 49'
FB	23	Sioeli Lama		(substituted on) 58'
Coach:
(England) Andy Robinson

FB	15	Ange Capuozzo
RW	14	Edoardo Padovani (c)
OC	13	Tommaso Menoncello	(substituted off) 58'
IC	12	Marco Zanon
LW	11	Pierre Bruno
FH	10	Tommaso Allan
SH	9	Alessandro Garbisi	(substituted off) 66'
N8	8	Toa Halafihi	(substituted off) 40'	(substituted on) 71'
BF	7	Manuel Zuliani	(substituted off) 58'
OF	6	Federico Ruzza
RL	5	Marco Fuser	(substituted off) 52'
LL	4	Niccolò Cannone	(substituted off) 64'
TP	3	Simone Ferrari	(substituted off) 52'
HK	2	Gianmarco Lucchesi	(substituted off) 52'
LP	1	Ivan Nemer
Replacements:
HK	16	Giacomo Nicotera	(substituted on) 52'
PR	17	Cherif Traore	(substituted on) 64'
PR	18	Ion Neculai	(substituted on) 52'
LK	19	David Sisi	(substituted on) 52'
FL	20	Michele Lamaro	(substituted on) 58'
FL	21	Renato Giammarioli	(substituted on) 40'	(substituted off) 71'
SH	22	Manfredi Albanese	(substituted on) 66'
FH	23	Paolo Garbisi	(substituted on) 58'
Coach:
(New Zealand) Kieran Crowley

Player of the Match:
Tommaso Allan (Italy)

Assistant referees:
Christophe Ridley (England)
Ian Tempest (England)
Television match official:
Eric Gauzins (France)

Notes:

- Victor Leon (Romania) and Alessandro Garbisi (Italy) made their international debuts.
- This was the first time since 2004, the last time Romania hosted Italy, that these two teams have met outside a World Cup*

1 July 2022
20:00 CDT (UTC-05)

United States	26–21	(France) French Barbarians
Try: Dyer 27'; Ainuʻu 36' c Con: MacGinty (2/2) 28', 37'; Pen: MacGinty (2/2) 43', 51'; Carty (1/1) 75'; Drop: de Haas (1/1) 14'	Report	Try: Aguillon 22' c Penalty try 54'; Lagarde 70' c Con: Trinh-Duc (1/1) 13'; Foursans (1/1) 71'

Aveva Stadium, Houston
Referee: Adam Jones (Wales)

Team details

FB	15	Marcel Brache
RW	14	Christian Dyer
OC	13	Tavite Lopeti
IC	12	Bryce Campbell		(substituted off) 54'
LW	11	Mitch Wilson
FH	10	AJ MacGinty (c)		(substituted off) 67'
SH	9	Ruben de Haas	(yellow card) 53' to 63'	(substituted off) 63'
N8	8	Cam Dolan
OF	7	Moni Tonga’uiha
BF	6	Hanco Germishuys		(substituted off) 40'
RL	5	Greg Peterson		(substituted off) 63'
LL	4	Nick Civetta
TP	3	Paul Mullen		(substituted off) 57'
HK	2	Kapeli Pifeleti		(substituted off) 51'
LP	1	David Ainuʻu		(substituted off) 51'
Replacements:
HK	16	Mike Sosene-Feagai		(substituted on) 51'
PR	17	Chance Wenglewski		(substituted on) 51'
PR	18	Joe Taufeteʻe		(substituted on) 57'
LK	19	Siaosi Mahoni		(substituted on) 63'
N8	20	Benjamín Bonasso		(substituted on) 40'
SH	21	Nate Augspurger		(substituted on) 63'
CE	22	Paul Lasike		(substituted on) 55'
FH	23	Luke Carty		(substituted on) 67'
Coach:
(South Africa) Gary Gold

FB	15	(France) Nans Ducuing
RW	14	(France) Adrien Lapègue
OC	13	(France) Jean-Baptiste Dubié
IC	12	(France) Pierre Aguillon
LW	11	(France) Mathieu Acebes		(substituted off) 44'
FH	10	(France) François Trinh-Duc		(substituted off) 51'
SH	9	(France) Thomas Berjon		(substituted off) 40'
N8	8	(France) Louis Picamoles
BF	7	(France) Alexandre Roumat
OF	6	(France) Esteban Abadie
RL	5	(France) Jimi Maximin		(substituted off) 40'
LL	4	(France) Romain Sazy (c)	(yellow card) 57' to 67'
TP	3	(France) Nicolas Corato		(substituted off) 51'
HK	2	(France) Clément Maynadier		(substituted off) 40'
LP	1	(France) Jefferson Poirot		(substituted off) 55'
Replacements:
HK	16	(France) Adrien Pélissié		(substituted on) 40'
PR	17	(France) Sébastien Taofifénua		(substituted on) 55'
FL	18	(France) William Wavrin		(substituted on) 51'
FL	19	(France) Anthime Hemery		(substituted on) 40'
SH	20	(Portugal) Samuel Marques		(substituted on) 40'
FH	21	(France) Louis Foursans		(substituted on) 51'
CE	22	(France) Raphaël Lagarde		(substituted on) 44'
PR	23	(France) Arthur Joly		(substituted on) 51'
Coaches:
(France) Christian Labit (France) Kevin Gourdon

Assistant referees:
Francisco Gonzalez (Uruguay)
Peter Pender (Canada)
Television match official:
Andrew Hosie (Canada)

2 July 2022
15:00 JST (UTC+09)

Japan	23–42	France
Try: Tatafu 14' c Fifita 80+1' c Con: Lee Seung-sin (2/2) 15', 80+2'; Pen: Lee Seung-sin (3/4) 6', 25', 54'	Report	Try: Penaud (2) 3' c, 58' c Lebel 45' c Moefana 61' m Bourgarit 68' c Con: Jaminet (4/5) 4', 46', 59', 69'; Pen: Jaminet (3/3) 19', 29', 52'

Toyota Stadium, Toyota
Attendance: 24,570
Referee: Frank Murphy (Ireland)

Team details

FB	15	Ryohei Yamanaka
RW	14	Gerhard van den Heever	(substituted off) 51'
OC	13	Dylan Riley
IC	12	Shogo Nakano	(substituted off) 63'
LW	11	Siosaia Fifita
FH	10	Lee Seung-sin
SH	9	Kaito Shigeno	(substituted off) 51'
N8	8	Tevita Tatafu	(substituted off) 51'
BF	7	Ben Gunter
OF	6	Michael Leitch
RL	5	Jack Cornelsen
LL	4	Wimpie van der Walt	(substituted off) 59'
TP	3	Asaeli Ai Valu	(substituted off) 70'
HK	2	Atsushi Sakate (c)	(substituted off) 70'
LP	1	Keita Inagaki	(substituted off) 51'
Replacements:
HK	16	Daigo Hashimoto	(substituted on) 70'
PR	17	Yukio Morikawa	(substituted on) 51'
PR	18	Shinnosuke Kakinaga	(substituted on) 70'
LK	19	Warner Dearns	(substituted on) 59'
FL	20	Faulua Makisi	(substituted on) 51'
SH	21	Daiki Nakajima	(substituted on) 51'
CE	22	Shane Gates	(substituted on) 63'
WG	23	Taichi Takahashi	(substituted on) 51'
Coach:
(New Zealand) Jamie Joseph

FB	15	Melvyn Jaminet
RW	14	Damian Penaud
OC	13	Virimi Vakatawa	(substituted off) 63'
IC	12	Yoram Moefana
LW	11	Matthis Lebel
FH	10	Matthieu Jalibert	(substituted off) 70'
SH	9	Maxime Lucu	(substituted off) 59'
N8	8	Yoan Tanga	(substituted off) 63'
OF	7	Dylan Cretin
BF	6	Charles Ollivon (c)
RL	5	Thomas Jolmès	(substituted off) 44'
LL	4	Thibaud Flament
TP	3	Demba Bamba	(substituted off) 47'
HK	2	Peato Mauvaka	(substituted off) 50' (substituted on) 73'
LP	1	Jean-Baptiste Gros	(substituted off) 47'
Replacements:
HK	16	Pierre Bourgarit	(substituted on) 50' (substituted off) 73'
PR	17	Dany Priso	(substituted on) 47'
PR	18	Sipili Falatea	(substituted on) 47'
LK	19	Thomas Lavault	(substituted on) 44'
FL	20	Selevasio Tolofua	(substituted on) 63'
FL	21	Sekou Macalou	(substituted on) 63'
SH	22	Baptiste Couilloud	(substituted on) 59'
FH	23	Antoine Hastoy	(substituted on) 70'
Coach:
(France) Fabien Galthié

Assistant referees:
Chris Busby (Ireland)
Shuhei Kubo (Japan) (Note: Replaced Mike Adamson, who pulled out two days before the game)
Television match official:
Ben Whitehouse (Wales)

Notes:

- Takuya Yamasawa (Japan) had been named to start but was replaced by Lee Seung-sin ahead of the game, who was replaced on the bench by Shane Gates.
- Yukio Morikawa, Taichi Takahashi (both Japan), Thomas Jolmès, Yoan Tanga and Thomas Lavault (France) made their international debuts.
- This was the first time Japan hosted a test match against France.

2 July 2022
19:05 NZST (UTC+12)

New Zealand	42–19	Ireland
Try: J. Barrett 21' c Reece 30' c Tupaea 35' c Savea (2) 38' c, 53' c Sowakula 71' c Con: J. Barrett (6/6) 22', 31', 36', 39', 54', 72'	Report	Try: Earls 6' m Ringrose 44' c Aki 77' c Con: Carbery (2/2) 46', 78'

Eden Park, Auckland
Attendance: 48,300
Referee: Karl Dickson (England)

Team details

FB	15	Jordie Barrett
RW	14	Sevu Reece
OC	13	Rieko Ioane		(substituted off) 67'
IC	12	Quinn Tupaea		(substituted off) 60'
LW	11	Leicester Fainga'anuku
FH	10	Beauden Barrett
SH	9	Aaron Smith		(substituted off) 60'
N8	8	Ardie Savea
BF	7	Sam Cane (c)		(substituted off) 67'
OF	6	Scott Barrett
RL	5	Sam Whitelock
LL	4	Brodie Retallick		(substituted off) 63'
TP	3	Ofa Tu'ungafasi		(substituted off) 54'
HK	2	Codie Taylor		(substituted off) 54'
LP	1	George Bower		(substituted off) 60'
Replacements:
HK	16	Samisoni Taukei'aho		(substituted on) 54'
PR	17	Karl Tu'inukuafe	(yellow card) 79'	(substituted on) 60'
PR	18	Angus Ta'avao		(substituted on) 54'
FL	19	Pita Gus Sowakula		(substituted on) 63'
FL	20	Dalton Papalii		(substituted on) 67'
SH	21	Finlay Christie		(substituted on) 60'
FH	22	Richie Mo'unga		(substituted on) 60'
CE	23	Braydon Ennor		(substituted on) 67'
Coach:
(New Zealand) Ian Foster

FB	15	Hugo Keenan
RW	14	Keith Earls	(substituted off) 57'
OC	13	Garry Ringrose
IC	12	Robbie Henshaw
LW	11	James Lowe
FH	10	Johnny Sexton (c)	(substituted off) 31'
SH	9	Jamison Gibson-Park	(substituted off) 72'
N8	8	Caelan Doris	(substituted off) 57'
BF	7	Josh van der Flier
OF	6	Peter O'Mahony
RL	5	James Ryan
LL	4	Tadhg Beirne	(substituted off) 65'
TP	3	Tadhg Furlong	(substituted off) 67'
HK	2	Dan Sheehan	(substituted off) 63'	(substituted on) 67'
LP	1	Andrew Porter
Replacements:
HK	16	Dave Heffernan	(substituted on) 63'	(substituted off) 67'
PR	17	Cian Healy
PR	18	Tom O'Toole	(substituted on) 67'
LK	19	Kieran Treadwell	(substituted on) 65'
N8	20	Jack Conan	(substituted on) 57'
SH	21	Conor Murray	(substituted on) 72'
FH	22	Joey Carbery	(substituted on) 31'
CE	23	Bundee Aki	(substituted on) 57'
Coach:
(England) Andy Farrell

Assistant referees:
Wayne Barnes (England)
Jordan Way (Australia)
Television match official:
Marius van der Westhuizen (South Africa)

Notes:

- Leicester Fainga'anuku and Pita Gus Sowakula (both New Zealand) made their international debuts.
- Finlay Bealham was originally named on the Ireland bench, but was replaced on match day by Tom O'Toole.

2 July 2022
17:55 AWST (UTC+8)

Australia	30–28	England
Try: Petaia 63 'c Fainga'a 69 'c Samu 76 'c Con: Lolesio (3/3) 64', 70', 77'; Pen: Lolesio (3/3) 23', 40', 43'	Report	Try: Genge 49' m Arundell 79 'c Van Poortvliet 80+2 'c Con: Farrell (2/3) 79', 80+3'; Pen: Farrell (3/4) 7', 21', 60'

Perth Stadium, Perth
Attendance: 47,668
Referee: James Doleman (New Zealand)

Team details

FB	15	Tom Banks		(substituted off) 21'
RW	14	Andrew Kellaway
OC	13	Len Ikitau
IC	12	Samu Kerevi
LW	11	Marika Koroibete		(substituted off) 78'
FH	10	Noah Lolesio	(yellow card) 80'
SH	9	Nic White		(substituted off) 74'
N8	8	Rob Valetini		(substituted off) 67'
BF	7	Michael Hooper (c)
OF	6	Rob Leota		(substituted off) 53'
RL	5	Caderyn Neville
LL	4	Darcy Swain	(red card) 30'
TP	3	Allan Alaalatoa		(substituted off) 25'
HK	2	Dave Porecki		(substituted off) 65'
LP	1	Angus Bell		(substituted off) 53'
Replacements:
HK	16	Folau Fainga'a		(substituted on) 65'
PR	17	Scott Sio		(substituted on) 53'
PR	18	James Slipper		(substituted on) 25'
LK	19	Matt Philip		(substituted on) 53'
FL	20	Pete Samu		(substituted on) 67'
SH	21	Jake Gordon		(substituted on) 74'
FH	22	James O'Connor		(substituted on) 78'
WG	23	Jordan Petaia		(substituted on) 21'
Coach:
(New Zealand) Dave Rennie

FB	15	Freddie Steward
RW	14	Jack Nowell
OC	13	Joe Marchant
IC	12	Owen Farrell
LW	11	Joe Cokanasiga		(substituted off) 73'
FH	10	Marcus Smith
SH	9	Danny Care		(substituted off) 78'
N8	8	Billy Vunipola	(yellow card) 66' to 76'
BF	7	Tom Curry		(substituted off) 40'
OF	6	Courtney Lawes (c)
RL	5	Jonny Hill	(yellow card) 30' to 40'	(substituted off) 68'
LL	4	Maro Itoje
TP	3	Will Stuart		(substituted off) 78'
HK	2	Jamie George		(substituted off) 65'
LP	1	Ellis Genge		(substituted off) 57'
Replacements:
HK	16	Luke Cowan-Dickie		(substituted on) 65'
PR	17	Mako Vunipola		(substituted on) 57'
PR	18	Joe Heyes		(substituted on) 78'
LK	19	Ollie Chessum		(substituted on) 68'
FL	20	Lewis Ludlam		(substituted on) 40'
SH	21	Jack van Poortvliet		(substituted on) 78'
CE	22	Guy Porter
FB	23	Henry Arundell		(substituted on) 73'
Coach:
(Australia) Eddie Jones

Player of the Match:
Samu Kerevi (Australia)

Assistant referees:
Andrew Brace (Ireland)
Craig Evans (Wales)
Television match official:
Brendon Pickerill (New Zealand)

Notes:

- Quade Cooper (Australia) had been named to start but pulled up injured in the warm-up and was replaced by Noah Lolesio. James O'Connor replaced Lolesio on the bench.
- Caderyn Neville, Dave Porecki (both Australia), Henry Arundell and Jack van Poortvliet (both England) made their international debuts.
- This was Australia's first win over England since the 2015 Rugby World Cup pool stage, breaking an eight-match losing streak to England.

2 July 2022
17:05 SAST (UTC+02)

South Africa	32–29	Wales
Try: Mbonambi 46' c Marx 51' m Kolbe 66' c Penalty try 75'; Con: Willemse (2/3) 48', 68'; Pen: E. Jantjies (1/3) 17'; Willemse (1/1) 80+3'	Report	Try: Rees-Zammit (2) 3' m, 32' c Lake 77' m Con: Biggar (1/3) 34'; Pen: Biggar (3/3) 20', 55', 63'; Drop: Biggar (1/1) 9'

Loftus Versfeld Stadium, Pretoria
Attendance: 51,762
Referee: Nika Amashukeli (Georgia)

Team details

FB	15	Damian Willemse
RW	14	Cheslin Kolbe
OC	13	Lukhanyo Am
IC	12	Damian de Allende
LW	11	Makazole Mapimpi
FH	10	Elton Jantjies	(substituted off) 41'
SH	9	Faf de Klerk	(substituted off) 71'
N8	8	Jasper Wiese
BF	7	Franco Mostert	(substituted off) 51'
OF	6	Siya Kolisi (c)	(substituted off) 51'
RL	5	Lood de Jager
LL	4	Eben Etzebeth	(substituted off) 70'
TP	3	Frans Malherbe	(substituted off) 50'
HK	2	Bongi Mbonambi	(substituted off) 50'
LP	1	Ox Nché	(substituted off) 50'
Replacements:
HK	16	Malcolm Marx	(substituted on) 50'
PR	17	Steven Kitshoff	(substituted on) 50'
PR	18	Vincent Koch	(substituted on) 50'
LK	19	Salmaan Moerat	(substituted on) 70'
FL	20	Elrigh Louw	(substituted on) 51'
FL	21	Kwagga Smith	(substituted on) 51'
SH	22	Herschel Jantjies	(substituted on) 71'
FB	23	Willie le Roux	(substituted on) 41'
Coach:
(South Africa) Jacques Nienaber

FB	15	Liam Williams
RW	14	Louis Rees-Zammit	(yellow card) 74'
OC	13	George North
IC	12	Nick Tompkins
LW	11	Josh Adams		(substituted off) 63'
FH	10	Dan Biggar (c)	(yellow card) 38' to 48'
SH	9	Kieran Hardy		(substituted off) 53'
N8	8	Taulupe Faletau
BF	7	Tommy Reffell
OF	6	Dan Lydiate		(substituted off) 63'
RL	5	Adam Beard		(substituted off) 50'
LL	4	Will Rowlands
TP	3	Dillon Lewis		(substituted off) 45'	(substituted on) 50'
HK	2	Ryan Elias		(substituted off) 50'
LP	1	Gareth Thomas		(substituted off) 53'
Replacements:
HK	16	Dewi Lake		(substituted on) 50'
PR	17	Rhys Carre	(yellow card) 75'	(substituted on) 53'
PR	18	Tomas Francis		(substituted on) 45'	(substituted off) 50'
LK	19	Alun Wyn Jones	(yellow card) 66' to 76'	(substituted on) 50'
FL	20	Josh Navidi		(substituted on) 63'
SH	21	Tomos Williams		(substituted on) 53'
FH	22	Gareth Anscombe
CE	23	Owen Watkin		(substituted on) 63'
Coach:
(New Zealand) Wayne Pivac

Player of the Match:
Jasper Wiese (South Africa)1

Assistant referees:
Angus Gardner (Australia)
Andrea Piardi (Italy)
Television match official:
Joy Neville (Ireland)

Notes:

- Elrigh Louw, Salmaan Moerat (both South Africa) and Tommy Reffell (Wales) made their international debuts.

2 July 2022
19:45 SAST (UTC+02)

Currie Cup XV (South Africa)	31–27	Italy A
Try: Kasende 34' m Masuku 34' m Johannes 46' c Xaba 51' c Jooste 63' c Con: Masuku (3/5) 47', 52', 65'		Try: Gesi 5' c Cannone 30' c Di Bartolomeo 57' c Con: Canna (3/3) 6', 30', 58'; Pen: Canna (2/2) 40', 42'

Nelson Mandela Bay Stadium, Port Elizabeth
Referee: Morné Ferreira (South Africa)

2 July 2022
16:00 ADT (UTC-03)

Canada	45–0	Belgium
Try: Higgins 6' c Rumball 47' c LeSage 55' c Coats 59' c Smith 66' c Lloyd 70' c Con: Nelson (4/4) 7', 48', 56', 60'; Coats (2/2) 67', 71'; Pen: Nelson (1/1) 16'	Report

Wanderers Grounds, Halifax, Nova Scotia
Attendance: 4,412
Referee: Hollie Davidson (Scotland)

Team details

FB	15	Cooper Coats
RW	14	Brock Webster
OC	13	Ben LeSage
IC	12	Quinn Ngawati	(substituted off) 53'
LW	11	Kainoa Lloyd
FH	10	Peter Nelson	(substituted off) 66'
SH	9	Jason Higgins	(substituted off) 53'
N8	8	Corey Thomas	(substituted off) 56'
OF	7	Michael Smith
BF	6	Lucas Rumball (c)	(substituted off) 60'
RL	5	Conor Keys
LL	4	Josh Larsen
TP	3	Jake Ilnicki	(substituted off) 48'
HK	2	Andrew Quattrin	(substituted off) 57'
LP	1	Djustice Sears-Duru	(substituted off) 57'
Replacements:
HK	16	Lindsey Stevens	(substituted on) 57'
PR	17	Liam Murray	(substituted on) 57'
PR	18	Tyler Rowland	(substituted on) 48'
LK	19	Callum Botchar	(substituted on) 60'
N8	20	Luke Campbell	(substituted on) 56'
SH	21	Ross Braude	(substituted on) 53'
FH	22	Gradyn Bowd	(substituted on) 66'
CE	23	Dawson Fatoric	(substituted on) 53'
Coach:
(Wales) Kingsley Jones

FB	15	Dazzy Cornez
RW	14	Hugo Ruelle
OC	13	Viktor Pazgrat	(substituted off) 56'
IC	12	Guillaume Piron
LW	11	Basile Poupaert
FH	10	Henri Dequenne
SH	9	Gauthier Petit	(substituted off) 56'
N8	8	Michael Abrahams	(substituted off) 51'
OF	7	Toon Deceuninck	(substituted off) 52'
BF	6	Jean-Maurice Decubber (c)
RL	5	Maximilien Hendrickx
LL	4	Guillaume Mortier	(substituted off) 37'
TP	3	Samuel Opsomer	(substituted off) 48'
HK	2	Alexis Cuffolo	(substituted off) 67'
LP	1	Bruno Vliegan	(substituted off) 45'
Replacements:
HK	16	Joachim Piérart	(substituted on) 67'
PR	17	Lucas Sotteau	(substituted on) 45'
PR	18	Basile van Parys	(substituted on) 48'
FL	19	Jérémie Brasseur	(substituted on) 52'
CE	20	Noé Finfe	(substituted on) 56'
SH	21	Marius Dehoust	(substituted on) 56'
N8	22	Lucas Rassinfosse	(substituted on) 51'
LK	23	Florent Lenaertz	(substituted on) 37'
Coach:
(France) Frédéric Cocqu

Assistant referees:
Kat Roche (United States)
Kahlil Harrison (United States)
Television match official:
Austin Reed (United States)

Notes:

- Callum Botchar, Dawson Fatoric, Lindsey Stevens (all Canada), Marius Dehoust, Noé Finfe, Joachim Piérart and Lucas Rassinfosse (all Belgium) made their international debuts.
- This was the first time that Canada have hosted Belgium.
- This was Canada's largest winning margin over Belgium, surpassing the 31-point difference set in 2010.

2 July 2022
16:10 ART (UTC-03)

Argentina	26–18	Scotland
Try: de la Fuente 30' m Carreras 35' c Bertranou 57' m Con: Boffelli (1/3) 36'; Pen: Sánchez (2/2) 4', 18'; Boffelli (1/2) 71'	Report	Try: Bennett 49' m Hutchinson 54' c Con: Kinghorn (1/2) 56'; Pen: Kinghorn (2/2) 16', 26'

Estadio 23 de Agosto, San Salvador de Jujuy
Attendance: 21,630
Referee: Nic Berry (Australia)

Team details

FB	15	Juan Cruz Mallía
RW	14	Santiago Cordero
OC	13	Matías Orlando	(substituted off) 66'
IC	12	Jerónimo de la Fuente	(substituted off) 57'
LW	11	Emiliano Boffelli
FH	10	Nicolás Sánchez	(substituted off) 21'
SH	9	Gonzalo Bertranou
N8	8	Pablo Matera
BF	7	Marcos Kremer	(substituted off) 60'
OF	6	Juan Martín González
RL	5	Matias Alemanno	(substituted off) 73'
LL	4	Guido Petti
TP	3	Francisco Gomez Kodela	(substituted off) 57'
HK	2	Julián Montoya (c)	(substituted off) 60'
LP	1	Nahuel Tetaz Chaparro	(substituted off) 57'
Replacements:
HK	16	Agustin Creevy	(substituted on) 60'
PR	17	Mayco Vivas	(substituted on) 57'
PR	18	Joel Sclavi	(substituted on) 57'
LK	19	Lucas Paulos	(substituted on) 73'
N8	20	Facundo Isa	(substituted on) 60'
WG	21	Juan Imhoff	(substituted on) 66'
FH	22	Santiago Carreras	(substituted on) 21'
CE	23	Matías Moroni	(substituted on) 57'
Coach:
(Australia) Michael Cheika

FB	15	Rory Hutchinson
RW	14	Darcy Graham
OC	13	Mark Bennett
IC	12	Sam Johnson
LW	11	Duhan van der Merwe
FH	10	Blair Kinghorn	(substituted off) 61'
SH	9	Ali Price	(substituted off) 68'
N8	8	Matt Fagerson
BF	7	Luke Crosbie	(substituted off) 54'
OF	6	Magnus Bradbury
RL	5	Jonny Gray	(substituted off) 68'
LL	4	Grant Gilchrist (c)
TP	3	Zander Fagerson	(substituted off) 61'
HK	2	George Turner	(substituted off) 61'
LP	1	Pierre Schoeman	(substituted off) 61'
Replacements:
HK	16	Ewan Ashman	(substituted on) 61'
PR	17	Rory Sutherland	(substituted on) 61'
PR	18	Javan Sebastian	(substituted on) 61'
LK	19	Sam Skinner	(substituted on) 68'
FL	20	Rory Darge	(substituted on) 54'
SH	21	Ben White	(substituted on) 68'
FH	22	Ross Thompson
CE	23	Sione Tuipulotu	(substituted on) 61'
Coach:
(Scotland) Gregor Townsend

Assistant referees:
Mathieu Raynal (France)
Pierre Brousset (France)
Television match official:
Marius Jonker (South Africa)

Notes:

- Tomás Cubelli (Argentina) had been named to start but withdrew ahead of the game and was replaced by Gonzalo Bertranou, who was replaced by Juan Imhoff on the bench.
- Joel Sclavi (Argentina) made his international debut.
- This was Argentina's first win over Scotland since 2011, and their first home win over the Scots since 2008.
- This was Argentina's first home game since they played South Africa in August 2019, nearly 3 years ago (1,057 days since their last home game)

3 July 2022
18:00 GET (UTC+4)

Georgia	24–30	Argentina XV
Try: Niniashvili 8' c Abzhandadze 23' c Cheishvili 80' c Con: Abzhandadze (3/3) 9', 24', 80'; Pen: Abzhandadze (1/1) 51'	Report	Try: Socino 58' c Ruiz 61' c Bernasconi 72' c Con: Albornoz (3/3) 59', 62', 73'; Pen: Prisciantelli (3/3) 14', 29', 49'

Aia Arena, Kutaisi
Referee: Gianluca Gnecchi (Italy)

Team details

FB	15	Davit Niniashvili	(substituted off) 63'
RW	14	Aka Tabutsadze
OC	13	Giorgi Kveseladze
IC	12	Merab Sharikadze (c)
LW	11	Alexander Todua	(substituted off) 71'
FH	10	Tedo Abzhandadze
SH	9	Vasil Lobzhanidze	(substituted off) 74'
N8	8	Beka Gorgadze
BF	7	Beka Saghinadze
OF	6	Otar Giorgadze	(substituted off) 60'
RL	5	Konstantin Mikautadze	(substituted off) 56'
LL	4	Lasha Jaiani
TP	3	Luka Japaridze	(substituted off) 58'
HK	2	Jaba Bregvadze	(substituted off) 51'
LP	1	Guram Gogichashvili	(substituted off) 63'
Replacements:
HK	16	Shalva Mamukashvili	(substituted on) 51'
PR	17	Nika Khatiashvili	(substituted on) 63'
PR	18	Guram Papidze	(substituted on) 58'
LK	19	Nodar Cheishvili	(substituted on) 56'
FL	20	Luka Ivanishvili	(substituted on) 60'
SH	21	Mikheil Alania	(substituted on) 74'
FB	22	Lasha Khmaladze	(substituted on) 63'
CE	23	Demur Tapladze	(substituted on) 71'
Coach:
(Georgia (country)) Levan Maisashvili

FB	15	Martín Bogado
RW	14	Sebastián Cancelliere	(substituted off) 60'
OC	13	Agustín Segura
IC	12	Lucas Mensa
LW	11	Julián Domínguez	(substituted off) 51'
FH	10	Gerónimo Prisciantelli	(substituted off) 51'
SH	9	Eliseo Morales
N8	8	Joaquín Oviedo	(substituted off) 53'
BF	7	Francisco Gorrissen (c)
OF	6	Tomás Lezana
RL	5	Nahuel Milán	(substituted off) 71'
LL	4	Franco Molina
TP	3	Santiago Medrano	(substituted off) 60'
HK	2	Santiago Socino	(substituted off) 63'
LP	1	Facundo Gigena	(substituted off) 60'
Replacements:
HK	16	Bautista Bernasconi	(substituted on) 63'
PR	17	Ignacio Calles	(substituted on) 60'
PR	18	Enrique Pieretto	(substituted on) 60'
LK	19	Santiago Ruiz	(substituted on) 53'
FL	20	Andrea Panzarini	(substituted on) 71'
FH	21	Tomás Albornoz	(substituted on) 51'
WG	22	Mateo Carreras	(substituted on) 60'
WG	23	Facundo Cordero	(substituted on) 51'
Coach:
(Argentina) Ignacio Fernández Lobbe

Assistant referees:
Sam Grove-White (Scotland)
Luc Ramos (France)
Television match official:
Matteo Lipperini (Italy)

=== 9/10 July ===
9 July 2022
14:50 JST (UTC+09)

Japan	15–20	France
Try: Yamanaka (2) 11' m, 39' c Con: Lee Seung-sin (1/2) 40'; Pen: Lee Seung-sin (1/1) 19'	Report	Try: Lebel 8' c Couilloud 70' c Con: Lucu (1/1) 9'; Jalibert (1/1) 71'; Pen: Lucu (1/1) 45'; Jalibert (1/1) 60'

National Stadium, Tokyo
Attendance: 57,011
Referee: Mike Adamson (Scotland)

Team details

FB	15	Ryohei Yamanaka
RW	14	Gerhard van den Heever
OC	13	Dylan Riley
IC	12	Shogo Nakano	(substituted off) 58'
LW	11	Siosaia Fifita
FH	10	Lee Seung-sin	(substituted off) 65'
SH	9	Naoto Saito	(substituted off) 65'
N8	8	Jack Cornelsen
BF	7	Ben Gunter
OF	6	Michael Leitch
RL	5	Sanaila Waqa	(substituted off) 57'
LL	4	Warner Dearns	(substituted off) 67'
TP	3	Asaeli Ai Valu	(substituted off) 61'
HK	2	Atsushi Sakate (c)	(substituted off) 58'
LP	1	Keita Inagaki	(substituted off) 71'
Replacements:
HK	16	Shota Horie	(substituted on) 58'
PR	17	Yukio Morikawa	(substituted on) 71'
PR	18	Yusuke Kizu	(substituted on) 61'
LK	19	Takayasu Tsuji	(substituted on) 67'
FL	20	Tevita Tatafu	(substituted on) 57'
SH	21	Kaito Shigeno	(substituted on) 65'
FH	22	Yu Tamura	(substituted on) 65'
CE	23	Shane Gates	(substituted on) 58'
Coach:
(New Zealand) Jamie Joseph

FB	15	Max Spring
RW	14	Damian Penaud	(substituted off) 64'
OC	13	Virimi Vakatawa
IC	12	Yoram Moefana
LW	11	Matthis Lebel
FH	10	Matthieu Jalibert
SH	9	Maxime Lucu	(substituted off) 50'
N8	8	Yoan Tanga
OF	7	Charles Ollivon (c)
BF	6	Dylan Cretin	(substituted off) 43'
RL	5	Thomas Jolmès	(substituted off) 43'
LL	4	Thibaud Flament
TP	3	Demba Bamba	(substituted off) 46'
HK	2	Peato Mauvaka	(substituted off) 43'
LP	1	Jean-Baptiste Gros	(substituted off) 46'
Replacements:
HK	16	Pierre Bourgarit	(substituted on) 43'
PR	17	Dany Priso	(substituted on) 46'
PR	18	Sipili Falatea	(substituted on) 46'
LK	19	Thomas Lavault	(substituted on) 43'
FL	20	Ibrahim Diallo	(substituted on) 43'
FL	21	Sekou Macalou	(substituted on) 64'
SH	22	Baptiste Couilloud	(substituted on) 50'
FH	23	Antoine Hastoy
Coach:
(France) Fabien Galthié

Assistant referees:
Frank Murphy (Ireland)
Chris Busby (Ireland)
Television match official:
Ben Whitehouse (Wales)

Notes:

- Max Spring (France) made his international debut.
- With this win, and other subsequent results the weekend before, France are ranked number 1 on the World Rugby Rankings for the first time.

9 July 2022
19:05 NZST (UTC+12)

New Zealand	12–23	Ireland
Try: B. Barrett 40+1' c Jordan 78' m Con: J. Barrett (1/2) 40+2	Report	Try: Porter (2) 3' c, 48' c Con: Sexton (2/2) 4', 49'; Pen: Sexton (3/3) 14', 56', 68'

Forsyth Barr Stadium, Dunedin
Attendance: 28,191
Referee: Jaco Peyper (South Africa)

Team details

FB	15	Jordie Barrett
RW	14	Sevu Reece
OC	13	Rieko Ioane
IC	12	Quinn Tupaea
LW	11	Leicester Fainga'anuku	(yellow card) 17' to 27'	(substituted off) 50'
FH	10	Beauden Barrett		(substituted off) 57'
SH	9	Aaron Smith		(substituted off) 62'
N8	8	Ardie Savea		(substituted off) 33'
BF	7	Sam Cane (c)
OF	6	Dalton Papalii		(substituted off) 26'	(substituted on) 36'	(substituted off) 69'
RL	5	Scott Barrett				(substituted off) 74'
LL	4	Brodie Retallick		(substituted off) 43'	(substituted on) 55'
TP	3	Ofa Tu'ungafasi (yellow card) 25' to 35'
HK	2	Codie Taylor		(substituted off) 57'
LP	1	George Bower				(substituted off) 64'
Replacements:
HK	16	Samisoni Taukei'aho		(substituted on) 57'
PR	17	Aidan Ross		(substituted on) 33'	(substituted off) 36'	(substituted on) 64'
PR	18	Angus Ta'avao	(red card) 31'	(substituted on) 26'
LK	19	Patrick Tuipulotu		(substituted on) 43'	(substituted off) 55'	(substituted on) 74'
FL	20	Pita Gus Sowakula				(substituted on) 69'
SH	21	Folau Fakatava		(substituted on) 62'
FH	22	Richie Mo'unga		(substituted on) 57'
FB	23	Will Jordan		(substituted on) 50'
Coach:
(New Zealand) Ian Foster

FB	15	Hugo Keenan
RW	14	Mack Hansen
OC	13	Garry Ringrose		(substituted off) 31'
IC	12	Robbie Henshaw
LW	11	James Lowe
FH	10	Johnny Sexton (c)		(substituted off) 74'
SH	9	Jamison Gibson-Park		(substituted off) 69'
N8	8	Caelan Doris		(substituted off) 64'	(substituted on) 76'
BF	7	Josh van der Flier
OF	6	Peter O'Mahony			(substituted off) 76'
RL	5	James Ryan	(yellow card) 39' to 49'	(substituted off) 69'
LL	4	Tadhg Beirne
TP	3	Tadhg Furlong		(substituted off) 65'
HK	2	Dan Sheehan		(substituted off) 64'
LP	1	Andrew Porter		(substituted off) 65'
Replacements:
HK	16	Rob Herring		(substituted on) 64'
PR	17	Cian Healy		(substituted on) 65'
PR	18	Finlay Bealham		(substituted on) 65'
LK	19	Kieran Treadwell		(substituted on) 69'
N8	20	Jack Conan		(substituted on) 64'
SH	21	Conor Murray		(substituted on) 69'
FH	22	Joey Carbery		(substituted on) 74'
CE	23	Bundee Aki		(substituted on) 31'
Coach:
(England) Andy Farrell

Assistant referees:
Karl Dickson (England)
Jordan Way (Australia)
Television match official:
Tom Foley (England)

Notes:

- Scott Barrett (New Zealand) earned his 50th test cap.
- Folau Fakatava and Aidan Ross (both New Zealand) made their international debuts.
- This was Ireland's first win over New Zealand on New Zealand soil.
- This was New Zealand's first loss at Forsyth Barr Stadium, and their first loss in Dunedin since 2009.
- With this loss, and other subsequent results the weekend before, New Zealand dropped to fourth in the World Rugby Rankings, their lowest ranking.

9 July 2022
19:55 AEST (UTC+10)

Australia	17–25	England
Try: Tupou 37' c Kerevi 48' c Con: Lolesio (2/2) 38', 49'; Pen: Lolesio (1/1) 54'	Report	Try: B. Vunipola 5' c Con: Farrell (1/1) 6'; Pen: Farrell (6/7) 11', 15', 23', 33', 44', 67'

Suncorp Stadium, Brisbane
Attendance: 46,536
Referee: Andrew Brace (Ireland)

Team details

FB	15	Jordan Petaia		(substituted off) 4'
RW	14	Tom Wright
OC	13	Hunter Paisami
IC	12	Samu Kerevi
LW	11	Marika Koroibete
FH	10	Noah Lolesio
SH	9	Nic White		(substituted off) 68'
N8	8	Rob Valetini
BF	7	Michael Hooper (c)
OF	6	Rob Leota		(substituted off) 68'
RL	5	Caderyn Neville		(substituted off) 57'
LL	4	Matt Philip
TP	3	Taniela Tupou		(substituted off) 50'
HK	2	Dave Porecki		(substituted off) 55'
LP	1	Angus Bell		(substituted off) 50'	(substituted on) 52'
Replacements:
HK	16	Folau Fainga'a		(substituted on) 55'
PR	17	Scott Sio		(substituted on) 50'	(substituted off) 52'
PR	18	James Slipper		(substituted on) 50'
LK	19	Nick Frost		(substituted on) 57'
FL	20	Pete Samu		(substituted on) 68'
SH	21	Jake Gordon		(substituted on) 68'
FH	22	James O'Connor			(substituted on) 41'
WG	23	Izaia Perese	(yellow card) 22' to 32'	(substituted on) 4'	(substituted off) 41'
Coach:
(New Zealand) Dave Rennie

FB	15	Freddie Steward
RW	14	Jack Nowell
OC	13	Guy Porter		(substituted off) 79'
IC	12	Owen Farrell
LW	11	Tommy Freeman		(substituted off) 70'
FH	10	Marcus Smith	(yellow card) 53' to 63'
SH	9	Jack van Poortvliet		(substituted off) 63'
N8	8	Billy Vunipola
BF	7	Sam Underhill		(substituted off) 58'
OF	6	Courtney Lawes (c)
RL	5	Jonny Hill
LL	4	Maro Itoje		(substituted off) 40'
TP	3	Will Stuart		(substituted off) 60'
HK	2	Jamie George		(substituted off) 55'
LP	1	Ellis Genge		(substituted off) 55'
Replacements:
HK	16	Luke Cowan-Dickie		(substituted on) 55'
PR	17	Mako Vunipola		(substituted on) 55'
PR	18	Joe Heyes		(substituted on) 60'
LK	19	Ollie Chessum		(substituted on) 40'
FL	20	Lewis Ludlam		(substituted on) 58'
SH	21	Danny Care		(substituted on) 63'
CE	22	Will Joseph		(substituted on) 79'
WG	23	Henry Arundell		(substituted on) 70'
Coach:
(Australia) Eddie Jones

Assistant referees:
Paul Williams (New Zealand)
Craig Evans (Wales)
Television match official:
Joy Neville (Ireland)

Notes:

- Jack Willis was originally named among the England substitutes, but pulled out prior to the match due to a rib injury. He was replaced on the bench by Will Joseph.
- Nick Frost (Australia), Tommy Freeman, Guy Porter and Will Joseph (England) made their international debuts.

9 July 2022
17:05 SAST (UTC+02)

South Africa	12–13	Wales
Pen: Pollard (4/6) 5', 43', 51', 59'	Report	Try: Adams 77' c Con: Anscombe (1/1) 78'; Pen: Biggar (1/3) 2'; Anscombe (1/1) 66'

Free State Stadium, Bloemfontein
Attendance: 46,000
Referee: Angus Gardner (Australia)

Team details

FB	15	Warrick Gelant
RW	14	Kurt-Lee Arendse
OC	13	Jesse Kriel
IC	12	André Esterhuizen
LW	11	Aphelele Fassi	(substituted off) 67'
FH	10	Handré Pollard (c)	(substituted off) 73'
SH	9	Jaden Hendrikse
N8	8	Evan Roos	(substituted off) 47'
BF	7	Pieter-Steph du Toit
OF	6	Marcell Coetzee	(substituted off) 47'
RL	5	Marvin Orie	(substituted off) 59'
LL	4	Eben Etzebeth
TP	3	Trevor Nyakane	(substituted off) 41'
HK	2	Joseph Dweba	(substituted off) 41'
LP	1	Thomas du Toit	(substituted off) 47'
Replacements:
HK	16	Malcolm Marx	(substituted on) 41'
PR	17	Ntuthuko Mchunu	(substituted on) 47'
PR	18	Vincent Koch	(substituted on) 41'
LK	19	Ruan Nortjé	(substituted on) 59'
FL	20	Rynhardt Elstadt	(substituted on) 47'
FL	21	Deon Fourie	(substituted on) 47'
SH	22	Grant Williams	(substituted on) 73'
FB	23	Damian Willemse	(substituted on) 67'
Coach:
(South Africa) Jacques Nienaber

FB	15	Liam Williams
RW	14	Louis Rees-Zammit
OC	13	George North
IC	12	Nick Tompkins
LW	11	Alex Cuthbert	(substituted off) 17'
FH	10	Dan Biggar (c)	(substituted off) 50'
SH	9	Kieran Hardy	(substituted off) 41'
N8	8	Taulupe Faletau
OF	7	Tommy Reffell
BF	6	Dan Lydiate	(substituted off) 59'
RL	5	Adam Beard
LL	4	Will Rowlands	(substituted off) 54'
TP	3	Dillon Lewis	(substituted off) 65'
HK	2	Ryan Elias	(substituted off) 49'
LP	1	Gareth Thomas	(substituted off) 49'
Replacements:
HK	16	Dewi Lake	(substituted on) 49'
PR	17	Wyn Jones	(substituted on) 49'
PR	18	Sam Wainwright	(substituted on) 65'
LK	19	Alun Wyn Jones (yellow card) 56' to 66'	(substituted on) 54'
FL	20	Josh Navidi	(substituted on) 59'
SH	21	Tomos Williams	(substituted on) 41'
FH	22	Gareth Anscombe	(substituted on) 50'
WG	23	Josh Adams	(substituted on) 17'
Coach:
(New Zealand) Wayne Pivac

Assistant referees:
Matthew Carley (England)
Andrea Piardi (Italy)
Television match official:
Brett Cronan (Australia)

Notes:

- Kurt-Lee Arendse, Deon Fourie, Ntuthuko Mchunu, Ruan Nortjé, Evan Roos, Grant Williams (all South Africa) and Sam Wainwright (Wales) made their international debuts.
- This was Wales' first test victory over South Africa on South African soil.
- This loss meant Australia, New Zealand and South Africa all lost at home on the same weekend for the first time.

9 July 2022
19:00 WET (UTC+0)

Portugal	35–52	Argentina XV
Try: Simões 11' c Storti (2) 14' c, 31' m Cardoso Pinto 41' m Con: Marques (2/4) 12', 15'; Pen: Marques (3/4) 18', 27', 59'	Report	Try: Carreras (3) 5' c, 36' c, 51' c Socino 21' c Bernasconi 56' c Mensa 71' c D'Amorim 79' c Con: Albornoz (5/5) 6', 22', 37', 52', 57'; Prisciantelli (2/2) 72', 80'; Pen: Prisciantelli (1/1) 77'

Estádio do Restelo, Lisbon
Referee: Sam Grove-White (Scotland)

Team details

FB	15	Nuno Sousa Guedes
RW	14	Raffaele Storti
OC	13	Rodrigo Marta
IC	12	Tomás Appleton (c)	(substituted off) 66'
LW	11	Manuel Cardoso Pinto	(substituted off) 54'
FH	10	Jerónimo Portela
SH	9	Samuel Marques	(substituted off) 70'
N8	8	Rafael Simões	(substituted off) 40'
OF	7	Thibault de Freitas
BF	6	João Granate
RL	5	José Madeira
LL	4	Duarte Torgal	(substituted off) 57'
TP	3	Anthony Alves	(substituted off) 40'
HK	2	Mike Tadjer	(substituted off) 64'
LP	1	Francisco Fernandes	(substituted off) 70'
Replacements:
PR	16	David Costa	(substituted on) 70'
HK	17	Nuno Mascarenhas	(substituted on) 64'
PR	18	Diogo Hasse Ferreira	(substituted on) 40'
LK	19	Martim Belo	(substituted on) 40'
FL	20	Vasco Batista	(substituted on) 57'
SH	21	Duarte Azevedo	(substituted on) 70'
CE	22	José Lima	(substituted on) 66'
FB	23	Simão Bento	(substituted on) 54'
Coach:
(France) Patrice Lagisquet

FB	15	Martín Bogado
RW	14	Mateo Carreras
OC	13	Agustín Segura
IC	12	Lucas Mensa
LW	11	Julián Domínguez	(substituted off) 40'
FH	10	Tomás Albornoz	(substituted off) 60'
SH	9	Eliseo Morales	(substituted off) 66'
N8	8	Santiago Ruiz	(substituted off) 48'
BF	7	Francisco Gorrissen (c)
OF	6	Tomás Lezana	(substituted off) 59'
RL	5	Nahuel Milán
LL	4	Franco Molina
TP	3	Santiago Medrano	(substituted off) 46'
HK	2	Santiago Socino	(substituted off) 46'
LP	1	Facundo Gigena	(substituted off) 46'
Replacements:
HK	16	Bautista Bernasconi	(substituted on) 46'
PR	17	Ignacio Calles	(substituted on) 46'
PR	18	Javier Coronel	(substituted on) 46'
FL	19	Joaquín Oviedo	(substituted on) 48'
FL	20	Nicolás D’Amorom	(substituted on) 59'
WG	21	Sebastián Cancelliere	(substituted on) 66'
FH	22	Gerónimo Prisciantelli	(substituted on) 66'
WG	23	Facundo Cordero	(substituted on) 40'
Coach:
(Argentina) Ignacio Fernández Lobbe

Assistant referees:
Gianluca Gnecchi (Italy)
Luc Ramos (France)
Television match official:
Matteo Lipperini (Italy)

9 July 2022
16:10 ART (UTC-03)

Argentina	6–29	Scotland
Pen: Boffelli (2/2) 6', 34'	Report	Try: Watson 37' m Bennett 43' c M. Fagerson 53' c Johnson 64' c Con: Kinghorn (1/2) 44'; Thompson (2/2) 54', 65'; Pen: Kinghorn (1/1) 4'

Estadio Padre Ernesto Martearena, Salta
Attendance: 20,900
Referee: Mathieu Raynal (France)

Team details

FB	15	Emiliano Boffelli	(yellow card) 51' to 61'
RW	14	Santiago Cordero
OC	13	Matías Orlando
IC	12	Jerónimo de la Fuente		(substituted off) 68'
LW	11	Juan Imhoff		(substituted off) 75'
FH	10	Santiago Carreras
SH	9	Gonzalo Bertranou		(substituted off) 71'
N8	8	Rodrigo Bruni		(substituted off) 46'
BF	7	Marcos Kremer
OF	6	Juan Martín González
RL	5	Matias Alemanno		(substituted off) 67'
LL	4	Guido Petti
TP	3	Francisco Gomez Kodela		(substituted off) 54'
HK	2	Julián Montoya (c)		(substituted off) 54'
LP	1	Nahuel Tetaz Chaparro		(substituted off) 49'
Replacements:
HK	16	Agustin Creevy		(substituted on) 54'
PR	17	Mayco Vivas		(substituted on) 49'
PR	18	Joel Sclavi		(substituted on) 54'
LK	19	Lucas Paulos		(substituted on) 67'
N8	20	Facundo Isa		(substituted on) 46'
SH	21	Felipe Ezcurra		(substituted on) 71'
FH	22	Domingo Miotti		(substituted on) 75'
CE	23	Matías Moroni		(substituted on) 68'
Coach:
(Australia) Michael Cheika

FB	15	Rory Hutchinson	(substituted off) 38'
RW	14	Darcy Graham
OC	13	Mark Bennett
IC	12	Sam Johnson
LW	11	Duhan van der Merwe
FH	10	Blair Kinghorn
SH	9	Ben White	(substituted off) 53'
N8	8	Matt Fagerson
BF	7	Hamish Watson	(substituted off) 69'
OF	6	Rory Darge
RL	5	Grant Gilchrist (c)	(substituted off) 64'
LL	4	Sam Skinner
TP	3	Zander Fagerson	(substituted off) 64'
HK	2	Dave Cherry	(substituted off) 58'
LP	1	Pierre Schoeman	(substituted off) 64'
Replacements:
HK	16	George Turner	(substituted on) 58'
PR	17	Jamie Bhatti	(substituted on) 64'
PR	18	Javan Sebastian	(substituted on) 64'
LK	19	Scott Cummings	(substituted on) 64'
FL	20	Andy Christie	(substituted on) 69'
SH	21	Ali Price	(substituted on) 53'
FH	22	Ross Thompson		(substituted on) 49'
WG	23	Kyle Rowe	(substituted on) 38'	(substituted off) 49'
Coach:
(Scotland) Gregor Townsend

Assistant referees:
Ben O'Keeffe (New Zealand)
Pierre Brousset (France)
Television match official:
Brian MacNeice (Ireland)

Notes:

- Hamish Watson (Scotland) earned his 50th test cap.
- Kyle Rowe (Scotland) made his international debut.

10 July 2022
20:00 GET (UTC+4)

Georgia	28–19	Italy
Try: Todua 11' m Abzhandadze (2) 13' c, 36' c Con: Abzhandadze (2/3) 14', 37'; Pen: Abzhandadze (2/3) 55', 78'; Aprasidze (1/1) 71'		Try: Menoncello 20' c Con: Allan (1/1) 21'; Pen: Allan (4/5) 27', 33', 51', 72'

Batumi Stadium, Batumi
Attendance: 20,000
Referee: Brendon Pickerill (New Zealand)

Team details

FB	15	Davit Niniashvili
RW	14	Aka Tabutsadze
OC	13	Giorgi Kveseladze
IC	12	Merab Sharikadze (c)
LW	11	Alexander Todua	(substituted off) 73'
FH	10	Tedo Abzhandadze
SH	9	Vasil Lobzhanidze	(substituted off) 55'
N8	8	Beka Gorgadze
BF	7	Beka Saghinadze
OF	6	Otar Giorgadze	(substituted off) 67'
RL	5	Lasha Jaiani
LL	4	Nodar Cheishvili
TP	3	Beka Gigashvili	(substituted off) 65'
HK	2	Shalva Mamukashvili	(substituted off) 27'	(substituted on) 37'	(substituted off) 52'
LP	1	Guram Gogichashvili	(substituted off) 58'
Replacements:
HK	16	Giorgi Chkoidze	(substituted on) 27'	(substituted off) 37'	(substituted on) 52'
PR	17	Nika Abuladze	(substituted on) 58'
PR	18	Luka Japaridze	(substituted on) 65'
FL	19	Lado Chachanidze
FL	20	Sandro Mamamtavrishvili	(substituted on) 67'
SH	21	Gela Aprasidze	(substituted on) 55'
FB	22	Lasha Khmaladze
CE	23	Demur Tapladze	(substituted on) 73'
Coach:
(Georgia (country)) Levan Maisashvili

FB	15	Ange Capuozzo
RW	14	Edoardo Padovani
OC	13	Ignacio Brex
IC	12	Marco Zanon		(substituted off) 44'
LW	11	Tommaso Menoncello
FH	10	Tommaso Allan
SH	9	Alessandro Garbisi		(substituted off) 61'
N8	8	Toa Halafihi	(yellow card) 36' to 46'	(substituted off) 70'
BF	7	Michele Lamaro (c)
OF	6	Federico Ruzza
RL	5	Marco Fuser		(substituted off) 51'
LL	4	Niccolò Cannone		(substituted off) 73'
TP	3	Simone Ferrari		(substituted off) 70'
HK	2	Gianmarco Lucchesi		(substituted off) 50'
LP	1	Danilo Fischetti		(substituted off) 50'
Replacements:
HK	16	Giacomo Nicotera		(substituted on) 50'
PR	17	Ivan Nemer		(substituted on) 50'
PR	18	Ion Neculai		(substituted on) 70'
LK	19	David Sisi		(substituted on) 73'
FL	20	Giovanni Pettinelli		(substituted on) 51'
FL	21	Renato Giammarioli		(substituted on) 70'
SH	22	Alessandro Fusco		(substituted on) 61'
FH	23	Paolo Garbisi		(substituted on) 44'
Coach:
(New Zealand) Kieran Crowley

Assistant referees:
Adam Leal (England)
Saba Abulashvili (Georgia)
Television match official:
Eric Gauzins (France)

Notes:

- Nika Abuladze (Georgia) made his international debut.
- This was Georgia's first win over Italy, and their first over any Tier 1 nation.

10 July 2022
15:30 UYT (UTC-03)

Uruguay	22–30	Romania
Try: Civetta 49' m Ardao 56' c Silva 58' c Con: Berchesi (2/3) 57', 59'; Pen: Berchesi (1/1) 38'	Report	Try: Bucur 4' c Rupanu 19' c Căpățână 79' c Con: Rupanu (2/2) 5', 20'; Popa (1/1) 80'; Pen: Rupanu (3/3) 33', 52', 71'

Estadio Charrúa, Montevideo
Referee: Tual Trainini (France)

Team details

FB	15	Rodrigo Silva		(substituted off) 68'	(substituted on) 77'
RW	14	Baltazar Amaya		(substituted off) 30'
OC	13	Nicolás Freitas
IC	12	Andrés Vilaseca (c)
LW	11	Gastón Mieres
FH	10	Felipe Echeverry
SH	9	Tomás Inciarte		(substituted off) 27'
N8	8	Manuel Ardao
OF	7	Santiago Civetta
BF	6	Lucas Bianchi		(substituted off) 71'
RL	5	Diego Magno		(substituted off) 64'
LL	4	Ignacio Dotti		(substituted off) 20'
TP	3	Ignacio Péculo			(substituted off) 77'
HK	2	Germán Kessler		(substituted off) 57'
LP	1	Mateo Sanguinetti		(substituted off) 64'
Replacements:
HK	16	Guillermo Pujadas		(substituted on) 57'
PR	17	Matías Benítez	(yellow card) 67' to 77'f	(substituted on) 64'
PR	18	Juan Echeverría		(substituted on) 68'
LK	19	Eric Dosantos		(substituted on) 20'
FL	20	Carlos Deus		(substituted on) 71'
FL	21	Franco Lamanna		(substituted on) 64'
SH	22	Agustín Ormaechea	(yellow card) 29' to 39'	(substituted on) 27'
FH	23	Felipe Berchesi		(substituted on) 30'
Coach:
(Argentina) Esteban Meneses

FB	15	Marius Simionescu (c)
RW	14	Mihai Lămboiu	(yellow card) 46' to 56'	(substituted off) 59'
OC	13	Alexandru Bucur
IC	12	Hinckley Vaovasa
LW	11	Adrian Apostol		(substituted off) 45'
FH	10	Vlăduț Popa
SH	9	Gabriel Rupanu		(substituted off) 71'
N8	8	Kamil Sobota		(substituted off) 71'
BF	7	Cristi Boboc
OF	6	Johannes van Heerden		(substituted off) 15'
RL	5	Andrei Toader		(substituted off) 64'
LL	4	Marius Iftimiciuc
TP	3	Alexandru Gordaș		(substituted off) 59'
HK	2	Tudor Butnariu	(red card) 14'
LP	1	Vasile Bălan		(substituted off) 69'
Replacements:
HK	16	Eugen Căpățână		(substituted on) 15'
PR	17	Dorin Tică		(substituted on) 69'
PR	18	Gheorghe Gajion		(substituted on) 59'
LK	19	Ștefan Iancu		(substituted on) 64'
FL	20	Alexandru Alexe		(substituted on) 71'
SH	21	Alexandru Țiglă		(substituted on) 71'
CE	22	Jason Tomane		(substituted on) 59'
FB	23	Sioeli Lama		(substituted on) 45'
Coach:
(England) Andy Robinson

Assistant referees:
Neheun Jauri Rivero (Argentina)
Tomas Bertazza (Argentina)
Television match official:
Austin Reed (United States)

Notes:

- Diego Magno (Uruguay) became the first player from the Americas region to earn 100 test caps.
- Gheorghe Gajion and Ștefan Iancu (both Romania) made their international debuts.

10 July 2022
16:00 EST (UTC-05)

Canada	34–57	Spain
Try: Stevens 25' c Rumball 45' c Lloyd 71' c McRogers 78' c Con: Nelson (2/2) 26', 46'; Bowd (2/2) 72', 79'; Pen: Nelson (2/2) 9', 19'	Report	Try: del Hoyo 6' c Bell 11' c Tauli 16' c Minguillon 21' m T. Munilla 33' c Alonso (2) 36' c, 65' c Ordas 41' m Jorba 51' m Con: Ordas (6/9) 7', 12', 17', 34', 37', 66'

TD Place Stadium, Ottawa
Attendance: 3,000
Referee: Luke Pearce (England)

Team details

FB	15	Cooper Coats
RW	14	Brock Webster
OC	13	Ben LeSage
IC	12	Quinn Ngawati	(substituted off) 61'
LW	11	Kainoa Lloyd
FH	10	Peter Nelson	(substituted off) 67'
SH	9	Ross Braude	(substituted off) 67'
N8	8	Luke Campbell	(substituted off) 69'
OF	7	Lucas Rumball (c)
BF	6	Matthew Oworu	(substituted off) 69'
RL	5	Conor Keys
LL	4	Corey Thomas
TP	3	Jake Ilnicki	(substituted off) 55'
HK	2	Lindsey Stevens	(substituted off) 64'
LP	1	Cole Keith	(substituted off) 77'
Replacements:
HK	16	Jack McRogers	(substituted on) 64'
PR	17	Liam Murray	(substituted on) 77'
PR	18	Djustice Sears-Duru	(substituted on) 55'
LK	19	Piers von Dadelszen	(substituted on) 69'
FL	20	Michael Smith	(substituted on) 69'
SH	21	Jason Higgins	(substituted on) 67'
CE	22	Dawson Fatoric	(substituted on) 61'
FH	23	Gradyn Bowd	(substituted on) 67'
Coach:
(Wales) Kingsley Jones

FB	15	J. W. Bell
RW	14	Jordi Jorba		(substituted off) 77'
OC	13	Alejandro Alonso
IC	12	Álvar Gimeno
LW	11	Gauthier Minguillon
FH	10	Manuel Ordas		(substituted off) 67'
SH	9	Tomás Munilla		(substituted off) 61'
N8	8	Afaese Tauli		(substituted off) 67'
OF	7	Matthew Foulds
BF	6	Michael Hogg
RL	5	Víctor Sánchez		(substituted off) 52'
LL	4	Manuel Mora
TP	3	Jon Zabala		(substituted off) 64'
HK	2	Vicente del Hoyo		(substituted off) 52'
LP	1	Fernando López (c)		(substituted off) 43'
Replacements:
PR	16	Thierry Futeu		(substituted on) 43'
HK	17	Santiago Ovejero		(substituted on) 52'
PR	18	Bittor Aboitiz	(yellow card) 75'	(substituted on) 64'
LK	19	Ekain Imaz		(substituted on) 67'
FL	20	Ignacio Piñeiro	(yellow card) 77'	(substituted on) 52'
SH	21	Facundo Munilla		(substituted on) 61'
FH	22	Bautista Güemes		(substituted on) 67'
WG	23	Pedro de la Lastra		(substituted on) 77'
Coach:
(Spain) Santiago Santos

Assistant referees:
Kat Roche (United States)
Kahlil Harrison (United States)
Television match official:
Stuart Teeherge (England)

Notes:

- This was Spain's first victory over Canada.
- Jack McRogers, Piers von Dadelszen (both Canada), Ekain Imaz and Ignacio Piñeiro (both Spain) made their international debuts.

=== 12 July ===
12 July 2022
19:05 NZST (UTC+12)

Māori All Blacks	24–30	Ireland
Try: Stevenson 2' m Penalty try 44'; Love 69' m Weber 80' c Con: Ioane (1/3) 80+1'	Report	Try: Penalty try 33'; Coombes 66' m Timoney 32' c Larmour 77' m Con: Frawley (1/3) 33'; Pen: Frawley (2/2) 25', 41'

Wellington Regional Stadium, Wellington
Attendance: 12,333
Referee: Karl Dickson (England)

Team details

FB	15	Josh Moorby		(substituted off) 56'
RW	14	Shaun Stevenson	(yellow card) 72'
OC	13	Bailyn Sullivan
IC	12	Alex Nankivell		(substituted off) 63'
LW	11	Connor Garden-Bachop
FH	10	Josh Ioane
SH	9	TJ Perenara (c)		(substituted off) 49'
N8	8	Cullen Grace
OF	7	Billy Harmon
BF	6	Reed Prinsep		(substituted off) 15'
RL	5	Isaia Walker-Leawere
LL	4	Manaaki Selby-Rickit		(substituted off) 63'
TP	3	Tyrel Lomax		(substituted off) 56'	(substituted on) 78'
HK	2	Kurt Eklund		(substituted off) 63'
LP	1	Ollie Norris	(yellow card) 30' to 40'				(substituted off) 49'
Replacements:
HK	16	Leni Apisai		(substituted on) 63'
PR	17	Tamaiti Williams			(substituted on) 38'	(substituted off) 40'	(substituted on) 49'
PR	18	Marcel Renata		(substituted on) 56'	(substituted off) 78'
FL	19	TK Howden		(substituted on) 63'
FL	20	Caleb Delany		(substituted on) 15'	(substituted off) 38'	(substituted on) 40'
SH	21	Brad Weber		(substituted on) 49'
FH	22	Ruben Love		(substituted on) 56'
CE	23	Billy Proctor		(substituted on) 63'
Coach:
(New Zealand) Clayton McMillan

FB	15	Michael Lowry		(substituted off) 62'	(substituted on) 74'
RW	14	Jordan Larmour	(yellow card) 44' to 54'
OC	13	Keith Earls (c)
IC	12	Stuart McCloskey
LW	11	Jimmy O'Brien
FH	10	Ciarán Frawley
SH	9	Craig Casey
N8	8	Gavin Coombes
OF	7	Nick Timoney
BF	6	Cian Prendergast	(yellow card) 26' to 36'
RL	5	Kieran Treadwell		(substituted off) 56'
LL	4	Joe McCarthy
TP	3	Tom O'Toole		(substituted off) 76'
HK	2	Niall Scannell
LP	1	Jeremy Loughman		(substituted off) 61'
Replacements:
HK	16	Rob Herring
PR	17	Ed Byrne		(substituted on) 61'
PR	18	Michael Bent		(substituted on) 76'
LK	19	Ryan Baird		(substituted on) 56'
N8	20	Jack Conan
SH	21	Conor Murray
FH	22	Joey Carbery		(substituted on) 62'	(substituted off) 74'
WG	23	Mack Hansen
Coach:
(England) Andy Farrell

Assistant referees:
Christophe Ridley (England)
Jordan Way (Australia)
Television match official:
James Leckie (Australia)

Notes:

- This was Ireland's first win over the Māori All Blacks.
- This was the Māori All Blacks first home loss since 2017.

=== 16/17 July ===
16 July 2022
19:05 NZST (UTC+12)

New Zealand	22–32	Ireland
Try: Savea 43' c A. Ioane 51' c Jordan 59' m Con: J. Barrett (2/3) 43', 52'; Pen: J. Barrett (1/2) 22'	Report	Try: Van der Flier 3' m Keenan 27' c Henshaw 36' c Herring 64' c Con: Sexton (3/4) 28', 37', 65'; Pen: Sexton (2/3) 31', 55'

Wellington Regional Stadium, Wellington
Attendance: 34,500
Referee: Wayne Barnes (England)

Team details

FB	15	Jordie Barrett
RW	14	Sevu Reece	(substituted off) 61'
OC	13	Rieko Ioane	(substituted off) 69'
IC	12	David Havili
LW	11	Will Jordan
FH	10	Beauden Barrett
SH	9	Aaron Smith	(substituted off) 61'
N8	8	Ardie Savea
BF	7	Sam Cane (c)	(substituted off) 63'
OF	6	Akira Ioane
RL	5	Sam Whitelock
LL	4	Brodie Retallick	(substituted off) 48'
TP	3	Nepo Laulala	(substituted off) 40'	(substituted on) 44'
HK	2	Codie Taylor	(substituted off) 61'
LP	1	George Bower	(substituted off) 71'
Replacements:
HK	16	Dane Coles	(substituted on) 61'
PR	17	Karl Tu'inukuafe	(substituted on) 71'
PR	18	Ofa Tu'ungafasi	(substituted on) 40'	(substituted off) 44'
FL	19	Tupou Vaa'i	(substituted on) 48'
FL	20	Dalton Papalii	(substituted on) 63'
SH	21	Folau Fakatava	(substituted on) 61'
FH	22	Richie Mo'unga	(substituted on) 61'
CE	23	Roger Tuivasa-Sheck	(substituted on) 69'
Coach:
(New Zealand) Ian Foster

FB	15	Hugo Keenan
RW	14	Mack Hansen
OC	13	Robbie Henshaw
IC	12	Bundee Aki		(substituted off) 68'
LW	11	James Lowe
FH	10	Johnny Sexton (c)		(substituted off) 75'
SH	9	Jamison Gibson-Park		(substituted off) 69'
N8	8	Caelan Doris
BF	7	Josh van der Flier		(substituted off) 53'	(substituted on) 58'
OF	6	Peter O'Mahony		(substituted off) 66'
RL	5	James Ryan
LL	4	Tadhg Beirne		(substituted off) 75'
TP	3	Tadhg Furlong		(substituted off) 69'
HK	2	Dan Sheehan		(substituted off) 52'
LP	1	Andrew Porter	(yellow card) 48' to 58'			(substituted off) 69'
Replacements:
HK	16	Rob Herring		(substituted on) 52'
PR	17	Cian Healy		(substituted on) 53'	(substituted off) 58'	(substituted on) 69'
PR	18	Finlay Bealham		(substituted on) 69'
LK	19	Kieran Treadwell		(substituted on) 75'
N8	20	Jack Conan		(substituted on) 66'
SH	21	Conor Murray		(substituted on) 69'
FH	22	Joey Carbery		(substituted on) 75'
WG	23	Keith Earls		(substituted on) 68'
Coach:
(England) Andy Farrell

Assistant referees:
Karl Dickson (England)
Christophe Ridley (England)
Television match official:
Tom Foley (England)

Notes:

- New Zealand's Scott Barrett (starting XV) and Aidan Ross had both been named in the team, but withdrew from the team ahead of kick-off. Akira Ioane replaced Barrett in the starting XV with Tupou Vaa'i joining the bench, whilst Karl Tu'inukuafe replaced Ross.
- Roger Tuivasa-Sheck (New Zealand) made his international debut, making him the fourth person to represent New Zealand in rugby union after having previously represented them in Rugby League.
- Rieko Ioane (New Zealand) earned his 50th test cap.
- Ireland win their first test series in New Zealand.
- This is the first time since 1994, and just the fifth in history, that New Zealand have lost a home test series.
- This the first time since 1998 that New Zealand have lost back-to-back home test matches.
- This is the first time that Ireland have won back-to-back matches against New Zealand.
- With this win, Ireland claim top spot in the World Rugby Rankings for the first time since 2019.

16 July 2022
19:55 AEST (UTC+10)

Australia	17–21	England
Try: Wright 23' c Fainga'a 65' c Con: Lolesio (2/2) 25', 66'; Pen: Lolesio (1/2) 30'	Report	Try: Steward 40' m Smith 54' c Con: Farrell (1/2) 55'; Pen: Farrell (3/4) 17', 33', 49'

Sydney Cricket Ground, Sydney
Attendance: 43,274
Referee: Paul Williams (New Zealand)

Team details

FB	15	Reece Hodge	(substituted off) 76'
RW	14	Tom Wright
OC	13	Hunter Paisami	(substituted off) 67'
IC	12	Samu Kerevi
LW	11	Marika Koroibete
FH	10	Noah Lolesio
SH	9	Nic White	(substituted off) 59'
N8	8	Rob Valetini	(substituted off) 72'
BF	7	Michael Hooper (c)
OF	6	Harry Wilson	(substituted off) 55'
RL	5	Matt Philip
LL	4	Nick Frost
TP	3	Taniela Tupou	(substituted off) 50'
HK	2	Dave Porecki	(substituted off) 55'
LP	1	James Slipper	(substituted off) 50'	(substituted on) 67'
Replacements:
HK	16	Folau Fainga'a	(substituted on) 55'
PR	17	Angus Bell	(substituted on) 50'	(substituted off) 67'
PR	18	Allan Alaalatoa	(substituted on) 50'
FL	19	Rob Leota	(substituted on) 72'
FL	20	Pete Samu	(substituted on) 55'
SH	21	Tate McDermott	(substituted on) 59'
CE	22	Len Ikitau	(substituted on) 67'
WG	23	Suliasi Vunivalu	(substituted on) 76'
Coach:
(New Zealand) Dave Rennie

FB	15	Freddie Steward
RW	14	Jack Nowell
OC	13	Guy Porter
IC	12	Owen Farrell
LW	11	Tommy Freeman	(substituted off) 69'
FH	10	Marcus Smith
SH	9	Danny Care	(substituted off) 36'
N8	8	Billy Vunipola
BF	7	Lewis Ludlam	(substituted off) 66'
OF	6	Courtney Lawes (c)
RL	5	Jonny Hill
LL	4	Ollie Chessum	(substituted off) 66'
TP	3	Will Stuart	(substituted off) 60'
HK	2	Jamie George	(substituted off) 45'
LP	1	Ellis Genge	(substituted off) 55'
Replacements:
HK	16	Luke Cowan-Dickie	(substituted on) 45'
PR	17	Mako Vunipola	(substituted on) 55'
PR	18	Joe Heyes	(substituted on) 60'
LK	19	Nick Isiekwe	(substituted on) 66'
FL	20	Jack Willis	(substituted on) 66'
SH	21	Jack van Poortvliet	(substituted on) 36'
CE	22	Will Joseph
WG	23	Henry Arundell	(substituted on) 69'
Coach:
(Australia) Eddie Jones

Assistant referees:
Andrew Brace (Ireland)
James Doleman (New Zealand)
Television match official:
Chris Hart (New Zealand)

Notes:

- Nic White (Australia) earned his 50th test cap.
- Suliasi Vunivalu (Australia) made his international debut.
- This was the first test match held at the Sydney Cricket Ground since Australia hosted Argentina in 1986.
- England claim the Ella–Mobbs Trophy (previously the Cook Cup) for the first time.

16 July 2022
18:00 GET (UTC+4)

Georgia	23–14	Portugal
Try: Modebadze 55' c Niniashvili 79' c Con: Abzhandadze (2/2) 56', 80'; Pen: Abzhandadze (3/3) 2', 10', 27'		Try: Marta 75' m Pen: Sousa Guedes (3/4) 20', 23', 49'

Aia Arena, Kutaisi
Referee: Adam Leal (England)

Team details

FB	15	Davit Niniashvili
RW	14	Mirian Modebadze	(substituted off) 35'	(substituted on) 40'
OC	13	Demur Tapladze	(substituted off) 56'
IC	12	Merab Sharikadze (c)
LW	11	Alexander Todua	(substituted off) 72'
FH	10	Tedo Abzhandadze
SH	9	Gela Aprasidze	(substituted off) 56'
N8	8	Luka Ivanishvili
BF	7	Sandro Mamamtavrishvili
OF	6	Mikheil Babunashvili	(substituted off) 68'
RL	5	Konstantin Mikautadze	(substituted off) 49'
LL	4	Lado Chachanidze
TP	3	Beka Gigashvili	(substituted off) 56'
HK	2	Giorgi Chkoidze	(substituted off) 45'
LP	1	Nika Abuladze	(substituted off) 45'
Replacements:
HK	16	Jaba Bregvadze	(substituted on) 45'
PR	17	Guram Gogichashvili	(substituted on) 45'
PR	18	Guram Papidze	(substituted on) 56'
LK	19	Nodar Cheishvili	(substituted on) 49'
FL	20	Beka Shvangiradze	(substituted on) 68'
SH	21	Vasil Lobzhanidze	(substituted on) 56'
FB	22	Lasha Khmaladze	(substituted on) 72'
CE	23	Giorgi Kveseladze	(substituted on) 35'	(substituted off) 40'	(substituted on) 56'
Coach:
(Georgia (country)) Levan Maisashvili

FB	15	Nuno Sousa Guedes
RW	14	Raffaele Storti
OC	13	Rodrigo Marta
IC	12	José Lima (c)		(substituted off) 72'
LW	11	Manuel Cardoso Pinto		(substituted off) 61'
FH	10	Jerónimo Portela
SH	9	João Belo		(substituted off) 68'
N8	8	Thibault de Freitas		(substituted off) 42'
OF	7	José Madeira
BF	6	João Granate
RL	5	Steevy Cerqueira
LL	4	Duarte Torgal	(yellow card) 36' to 46'	(substituted off) 70'
TP	3	Anthony Alves		(substituted off) 56'
HK	2	Mike Tadjer		(substituted off) 72'
LP	1	Francisco Fernandes		(substituted off) 61'
Replacements:
PR	16	David Costa		(substituted on) 61'
HK	17	Duarte Diniz		(substituted on) 72'
PR	18	Diogo Hasse Ferreira		(substituted on) 56'
LK	19	Martim Belo		(substituted on) 42'
FL	20	Nicolas Martins		(substituted on) 70'
SH	21	Pedro Lucas		(substituted on) 68'
FH	22	Domingos Cabral		(substituted on) 72'
WG	23	Vincent Pinto		(substituted on) 61'
Coach:
(France) Patrice Lagisquet

Assistant referees:
Chris Busby (Ireland)
Saba Abulasvhili (Georgia)
Television match official:
Ian Tempest (England)

Notes:

- Mikheil Babunashvili, Beka Shvangiradze (both Georgia), Martim Belo and Domingos Cabral (both Portugal) made their international debuts.
- Alexander Todua (Georgia) earned his 100th test cap, the fourth Georgian player to do so.

16 July 2022
17:05 SAST (UTC+02)

South Africa	30–14	Wales
Try: Pollard 14' c Mbonambi 38' c Kolisi 53' c Con: Pollard (3/3) 16', 39', 54'; Pen: Pollard (3/3) 5', 78', 80+1'	Report	Try: Reffell 19' m Pen: Biggar (3/3) 33', 42', 48'

Cape Town Stadium, Cape Town
Attendance: 51,347
Referee: Matthew Carley (England)

Team details

FB	15	Damian Willemse
RW	14	Cheslin Kolbe	(substituted off) 21'
OC	13	Lukhanyo Am
IC	12	Damian de Allende
LW	11	Makazole Mapimpi
FH	10	Handré Pollard
SH	9	Jaden Hendrikse	(substituted off) 65'
N8	8	Jasper Wiese	(substituted off) 39'
BF	7	Pieter-Steph du Toit	(substituted off) 77'
OF	6	Siya Kolisi (c)
RL	5	Lood de Jager
LL	4	Eben Etzebeth	(substituted off) 61'
TP	3	Frans Malherbe	(substituted off) 45'
HK	2	Bongi Mbonambi	(substituted off) 45'
LP	1	Trevor Nyakane	(substituted off) 45'
Replacements:
HK	16	Malcolm Marx	(substituted on) 45'
PR	17	Steven Kitshoff	(substituted on) 45'
PR	18	Vincent Koch	(substituted on) 45'
LK	19	Franco Mostert	(substituted on) 61'
FL	20	Kwagga Smith	(substituted on) 39'
FL	21	Elrigh Louw	(substituted on) 77'
SH	22	Faf de Klerk	(substituted on) 65'
FB	23	Willie le Roux	(substituted on) 21'
Coach:
(South Africa) Jacques Nienaber

FB	15	Liam Williams
RW	14	Louis Rees-Zammit
OC	13	George North
IC	12	Nick Tompkins	(substituted off) 60'
LW	11	Josh Adams
FH	10	Dan Biggar (c)
SH	9	Kieran Hardy	(substituted off) 51'
N8	8	Josh Navidi
OF	7	Tommy Reffell	(substituted off) 55'
BF	6	Dan Lydiate	(substituted off) 16'
RL	5	Adam Beard
LL	4	Will Rowlands
TP	3	Dillon Lewis	(substituted off) 41'
HK	2	Ryan Elias	(substituted off) 40'
LP	1	Gareth Thomas	(substituted off) 56'
Replacements:
HK	16	Dewi Lake	(substituted on) 40'
PR	17	Wyn Jones	(substituted on) 56'
PR	18	Sam Wainwright	(substituted on) 41'
LK	19	Alun Wyn Jones	(substituted on) 16'
FL	20	Taine Basham	(substituted on) 55'
SH	21	Tomos Williams	(substituted on) 51'
FH	22	Rhys Patchell
CE	23	Owen Watkin	(substituted on) 60'
Coach:
(New Zealand) Wayne Pivac

Assistant referees:
Angus Gardner (Australia)
Nika Amashukeli (Georgia)
Television match official:
Brett Cronan (Australia)

Notes:

- Taulupe Faletau was originally named to start for Wales, but pulled out during the warm-up. He was replaced in the starting line-up by Josh Navidi, whose place in the bench was taken by Taine Basham.
- Gareth Anscombe was originally named on the bench for Wales, but pulled out during the warm-up. His place was taken by Rhys Patchell.
- Eben Etzebeth (South Africa) earned his 100th test cap.
- Bongi Mbonambi (South Africa) earned his 50th test cap.
- George North (Wales) earned his 105th test cap, surpassing Stephen Jones' record to become Wales' most capped back.

16 July 2022
16:10 ART (UTC-03)

Argentina	34–31	Scotland
Try: Carreras 20' c Chaparro 51' c Bertranou 67' c Boffelli 80+1' c Con: Boffelli (4/4) 21', 53', 68', 80+2'; Pen: Boffelli (2/3) 11', 35'	Report	Try: Van der Merwe (2) 13' c, 48' c Ashman (2) 25' c, 43' c Con: Kinghorn (4/4) 14', 27', 45', 49'); Pen: Kinghorn (1/2) 65'

Estadio Único Madre de Ciudades, Santiago del Estero
Attendance: 30,000
Referee: Ben O'Keeffe (New Zealand)

Team details

FB	15	Juan Cruz Mallía
RW	14	Bautista Delguy	(substituted off) 49'
OC	13	Matías Orlando
IC	12	Matías Moroni
LW	11	Emiliano Boffelli
FH	10	Santiago Carreras
SH	9	Lautaro Bazán	(substituted off) 62'
N8	8	Facundo Isa	(substituted off) 68'
BF	7	Santiago Grondona
OF	6	Pablo Matera (c)
RL	5	Tomás Lavanini	(substituted off) 49'
LL	4	Guido Petti
TP	3	Joel Sclavi	(substituted off) 50'
HK	2	Agustin Creevy	(substituted off) 59'
LP	1	Thomas Gallo	(substituted off) 50'
Replacements:
HK	16	Ignacio Ruiz	(substituted on) 59'
PR	17	Nahuel Tetaz Chaparro	(substituted on) 50'
PR	18	Francisco Gómez Kodela	(substituted on) 50'
FL	19	Marcos Kremer	(substituted on) 49'
FL	20	Juan Martín González	(substituted on) 68'
SH	21	Gonzalo Bertranou	(substituted on) 62'
FH	22	Tomás Albornoz
CE	23	Lucio Cinti	(substituted on) 49'
Coach:
(Australia) Michael Cheika

FB	15	Ollie Smith	(substituted off) 75'
RW	14	Rufus McLean
OC	13	Mark Bennett
IC	12	Sione Tuipulotu
LW	11	Duhan van der Merwe
FH	10	Blair Kinghorn
SH	9	Ali Price
N8	8	Matt Fagerson
BF	7	Hamish Watson (c)	(substituted off) 74'
OF	6	Rory Darge
RL	5	Jonny Gray
LL	4	Scott Cummings	(substituted off) 69'
TP	3	Zander Fagerson
HK	2	Ewan Ashman	(substituted off) 53'
LP	1	Rory Sutherland	(substituted off) 53'
Replacements:
HK	16	Dave Cherry	(substituted on) 53'
PR	17	Pierre Schoeman	(substituted on) 53'
PR	18	Javan Sebastian
LK	19	Glen Young	(substituted on) 69'
FL	20	Andy Christie	(substituted on) 74'
SH	21	George Horne
FH	22	Ross Thompson	(substituted on) 75'
CE	23	Sam Johnson
Coach:
(Scotland) Gregor Townsend

Assistant referees:
Mathieu Raynal (France)
Tual Trainini (France)
Television match official:
Brian MacNeice (Ireland)

Notes:

- Lautaro Bazán, Ignacio Ruiz (both Argentina), Ollie Smith and Glen Young (both Scotland) made their international debuts.
- Matías Orlando (Argentina) and Zander Fagerson (Scotland) earned their 50th test caps.
- Argentina win a home test series for the first time since beating Ireland 2–0 in 2007.
- Argentina win their first three-test series over Scotland, and their first series win against Scotland since their two-test series win in 1994.

17 July 2022
15:30 UYT (UTC-03)

Uruguay	26–20	Romania
Try: Echeverry 12′ m Dosantos 16' c Ormaechea 24' c Vilaseca 50' c Con: Berchesi (3/4) 17', 25', 51'	Report	Try: Penalty try 4'; Simionescu 19' c Con: Rupanu (1/1) 20'; Pen: Rupanu (1/1) 40+1'; Mureșan (1/1) 66'

Estadio Charrúa, Montevideo
Referee: Pierre Brousset (France)

Team details

FB	15	Felipe Echeverry		(substituted off) 60'
RW	14	Rodrigo Silva
OC	13	Felipe Arcos Pérez		(substituted off) 79'
IC	12	Andrés Vilaseca (c)
LW	11	Nicolás Freitas
FH	10	Felipe Berchesi
SH	9	Agustín Ormaechea		(substituted off) 55'
N8	8	Manuel Ardao	(yellow card) 4' to 14'
OF	7	Santiago Civetta
BF	6	Lucas Bianchi		(substituted off) 77'
RL	5	Franco Lamanna		(substituted off) 66'
LL	4	Eric Dosantos
TP	3	Ignacio Péculo		(substituted off) 74'
HK	2	Germán Kessler		(substituted off) 66'
LP	1	Mateo Sanguinetti		(substituted off) 63'
Replacements:
HK	16	Guillermo Pujadas		(substituted on) 66'
PR	17	Juan Echeverría		(substituted on) 63'
PR	18	Matías Franco		(substituted on) 74'
LK	19	Tomás Etcheverry		(substituted on) 66'
FL	20	Carlos Deus		(substituted on) 77'
SH	21	Tomás Inciarte		(substituted on) 55'
CE	22	Bautista Basso		(substituted on) 60'
WG	23	Juan Manuel Alonso		(substituted on) 79'
Coach:
(Argentina) Esteban Meneses

FB	15	Marius Simionescu (c)
RW	14	Sioeli Lama
OC	13	Alexandru Bucur	(substituted off) 55'
IC	12	Jason Tomane
LW	11	Hinckley Vaovasa
FH	10	Vlăduț Popa	(substituted off) 64'
SH	9	Gabriel Rupanu	(substituted off) 49'
N8	8	Kamil Sobota
BF	7	Cristi Boboc			(substituted off) 49'
OF	6	Johannes van Heerden
RL	5	Andrei Toader	(substituted off) 25'	(substituted on) 38'
LL	4	Marius Iftimiciuc	(substituted off) 52'
TP	3	Gheorghe Gajion	(substituted off) 49'
HK	2	Eugen Căpățână	(substituted off) 49'
LP	1	Dorin Tică	(substituted off) 49'
Replacements:
HK	16	Iulian Harțig	(substituted on) 49'
PR	17	Vasile Bălan	(substituted on) 49'
PR	18	Victor Leon	(substituted on) 49'
LK	19	Ștefan Iancu	(substituted on) 52'
FL	20	Dragoș Ser	(substituted on) 25'	(substituted off) 38'	(substituted on) 49'
SH	21	Alexandru Țiglă	(substituted on) 49'
FH	22	Mihai Mureșan	(substituted on) 64'
FB	23	Gabriel Pop	(substituted on) 55'
Coach:
(England) Andy Robinson

Assistant referees:
Neheun Jauri Rivero (Argentina)
Gonzalo de Achaval (Argentina)
Television match official:
Lucas Galán (Argentina)

Notes:

- Nicolás Freitas (Uruguay) and Johannes van Heerden (Romania) earned their 50th test caps.
- Mihai Mureșan and Gabriel Pop (both Romania) made their international debuts.

== See also ==
- 2022 end-of-year rugby union internationals
- 2022 World Rugby Pacific Nations Cup
- 2023 Rugby World Cup – Africa qualification
- 2023 Rugby World Cup – Americas qualification
- 2023 Rugby World Cup – Asia qualification
