= Davide Ruggeri =

Italian rugby union player

- Born: 7 May 1999 (age 27) Como, Italy
- Height: 1.90 m (6 ft 3 in)
- Weight: 100 kg (15 st 10 lb; 220 lb)

Rugby union career
- Position: Flanker
- Current team: Zebre Parma
Youth career
- Rugby Como
- –: Rugby Milano
Senior career
Years	Team	Apps	(Points)
2017−2019	F.I.R. Academy		
2018	→Zebre	1	(0)
2019−2022	Rovigo Delta	48	(50)
2020−2021	→Benetton	4	(5)
2022−	Zebre Parma	46	(0)
- Correct as of 9 Aug 2026
International career
Years	Team	Apps	(Points)
2018−2019	Italy Under 20	17	(0)
2021−2022	Emerging Italy	2	(15)
2022	Italy A	1	(5)
2026	Italy XV	1	(0)
- Correct as of 24 Jun 2022

Davide Ruggeri (born 7 May 1999) is an Italian rugby union player. His usual position is as a Flanker and he currently plays for Zebre Parma in United Rugby Championship.

Selected for F.I.R. Academy squad, in 2018–19 Pro14 season, Ruggeri was named as Additional Player for Zebre and for 2020–21 Pro14 season, under contract with Rovigo Delta in Top12, he was named as Permit Player for Benetton Rugby.

In 2018 and 2019, Ruggeri was named in the Italy Under 20 squad. On 8 December 2021, he was selected by Alessandro Troncon to be part of an Emerging Italy 27-man squad for the 2021 end-of-year rugby union internationals. On 26 May Ruggeri was called in Italy A squad for the South African tour in the 2022 mid-year rugby union tests against Namibia and Currie Cup XV team. On 30 November 2023 he was called in Italy Under 23 squad for test series against IRFU Combined Academies. On 28 January 2026 he was selected by Massimo Brunello to be part of an Italy XV squad for two official tests against Scotland A and Chile during 2026 men's rugby union internationals window of spring.
