= Mihai Mureșan =

Romanian rugby union player

- Full name: Alexandru Mihai Mureșan
- Born: 2 October 2002 (age 24) Romania
- Height: 1.73 m (5 ft 8 in)
- Weight: 81 kg (12 st 11 lb; 179 lb)

Rugby union career
- Position: Fly-half
- Current team: CSM Știința Baia Mare
Youth career
- 2017–2021: Clubul Sportiv Școlar 2 Baia Mare
Senior career
Years	Team	Apps	(Points)
2021–present	CSM Știința Baia Mare	8	(37)
- Correct as of 8 September 2023
International career
Years	Team	Apps	(Points)
2021–2022	Romania U-20	6	(0)
2022–present	Romania	3	(5)
- Correct as of 8 September 2023

Mihai Mureșan (born 2 October 2002) is a Romanian rugby union player who plays for CSM Știința Baia Mare in the Liga Națională de Rugby.

== Club career ==
Mureșan began his senior career at CSM Știința Baia Mare in 2021, has quickly become a regular name in the starting line-up for Baia Mare since 2023.

== International career ==
Mureșan represented Romania at age grade level during the 2021 and 2022 editions of the Rugby Europe Under-20 Championship. Mureșan had amassed 6 caps for the U20s team across the two years, although without scoring any points.

Mureșan made his debut for the Romanian senior national team in 2022 against Los Teros in the 2022 mid-year rugby union tests.

== Honours ==
=== CSM Știința Baia Mare ===
- Liga Națională de Rugby: 2021, 2022
