= Bautista Basso =

Uruguay international rugby union player

- Born: 18 January 2001 (age 25)
- Height: 180 cm (5 ft 11 in)
- Weight: 85 kg (187 lb; 13 st 5 lb)

Rugby union career
- Position: Wing
International career
Years	Team	Apps	(Points)
2022–	Uruguay	8	(5)

Bautista Domingo Basso Martínez (born January 18, 2001) is an Uruguayan rugby union player. Basso has played for both the Uruguay national rugby sevens team and the Uruguay national rugby union team. He has represented the Uruguay sevens team on the World Rugby Sevens Series.

Basso was educated at The British Schools of Montevideo.

== Career ==
Basso represents Peñarol Rugby in the Super Liga Americana de Rugby. He was first called up to the Uruguay national squad in June 2022. He debuted for Uruguay starting at wing in a 7–43 loss against Japan on June 25 in the 2022 mid-year rugby union tests. He got his next cap on July 17, 2022, coming in as a substitute in Uruguay’s win against Romania. He was selected for the 2023 Rugby World Cup.

He competed for the Uruguayan sevens team at the 2024 Summer Olympics in Paris.
