= Jack McRogers =

Canada international rugby union player

- Born: 15 October 1998 (age 28) Newmarket, Ontario, Canada
- Height: 180 cm (5 ft 11 in)
- Weight: 96 kg (212 lb; 15 st 2 lb)

Rugby union career
- Position: Hooker
- Current team: Toronto Arrows
Senior career
Years	Team	Apps	(Points)
2019–	Toronto Arrows	33	(40)
- Correct as of 20 March 2023
International career
Years	Team	Apps	(Points)
2017–2018	Canada U20		
2022–	Canada	1	(5)
- Correct as of 20 March 2023

Jack McRogers (born 15 October 1998) is a Canadian rugby union player, currently playing for the Toronto Arrows in Major League Rugby (MLR). His preferred position is hooker.

== Early career ==
McRogers is from Newmarket, Ontario and began playing rugby while living in New Zealand as a child. He studied at McMaster University and represented Canadian Universities.

== Professional career ==
McRogers signed for the Toronto Arrows ahead of the 2019 Major League Rugby season. He has remained with the side since.

McRogers represented Canada U20 in both 2017 and 2018. He made his debut for the full Canada side in 2022 against Spain, scoring a try on debut.
