= Alexandru Bucur =

Romania international rugby union player

- Full name: Alexandru Petru Bucur
- Born: 24 April 1994 (age 32) Bârlad, Romania
- Height: 1.75 m (5 ft 9 in)
- Weight: 82 kg (12 st 13 lb; 181 lb)
- University: Facultatea de Eucație Fizică și Sport Baia Mare

Rugby union career
- Position(s): Centre, Full-back
- Current team: CSM Baia Mare
Youth career
- 2009–2012: Clubul Sportiv Școlar Bârlad
- 2012–2013: Clubul Sportiv Școlar 2 Siromex Baia Mare
Senior career
Years	Team	Apps	(Points)
2013–present	CSM Baia Mare	30	(87)
- Correct as of 17 March 2019
International career
Years	Team	Apps	(Points)
2018–present	Romania	4	(0)
- Correct as of 17 March 2019

Alexandru Petru Bucur (born 24 April 1994) is a Romanian rugby union footballer. He plays as a centre or full-back for the professional SuperLiga club CSM Baia Mare.

== Club career ==
Alexandru Bucur started playing rugby in 2009 at 15 years and a half with Romanian youth club Clubul Sportiv Școlar Bârlad and from 2012 he was selected to join another youth club, Clubul Sportiv Școlar 2 Siromex Baia Mare. After one year with Siromex Baia Mare, Alexandru signed on 2 July 2013 a contract with SuperLiga side CSM Baia Mare.

In 2016, Bucur was part of the CSM Baia Mare squad that won the Romanian Cup, contributing in both attack and defence throughout the campaign.

== International career ==
In November 2018, he was called for Romania's national team, the Oaks, making his international debut during the 2018 end-of-year rugby union internationals in a test match against Los Teros. He has since made appearances in Rugby Europe Championship matches, often featuring as a versatile backline option.
