= Shunsuke Asaoka =

Japan international rugby union player

- Full name: Shunsuke Asaoka
- Born: 24 June 1996 (age 30) Kyoto Prefecture, Japan
- Height: 1.86 m (6 ft 1 in)
- Weight: 125 kg (19 st 10 lb; 276 lb)

Rugby union career
- Position: Prop
- Current team: Mitsubishi Dynaboars
Senior career
Years	Team	Apps	(Points)
2019–2025	Toyota Verblitz	68	(0)
2023	Southland	0	(0)
2025–	Mitsubishi Dynaboars	14	(0)
- Correct as of 02 March 2025
International career
Years	Team	Apps	(Points)
2016	Japan U20	0	(0)
2021–	Japan	1	(0)
- Correct as of 16 April 2021

Shunsuke Asaoka (淺岡 俊亮, Asaoka Shunsuke; born 24 June 1996) is a Japanese rugby union player who plays as a prop. He currently plays for Toyota Verblitz in Japan's domestic Top League.

== International ==
Japan head coach Jamie Joseph has named Shunsuke Asaoka in a 52-man training squad ahead of British and Irish Lions test.
