= Jimi Maximin =

France international rugby union player

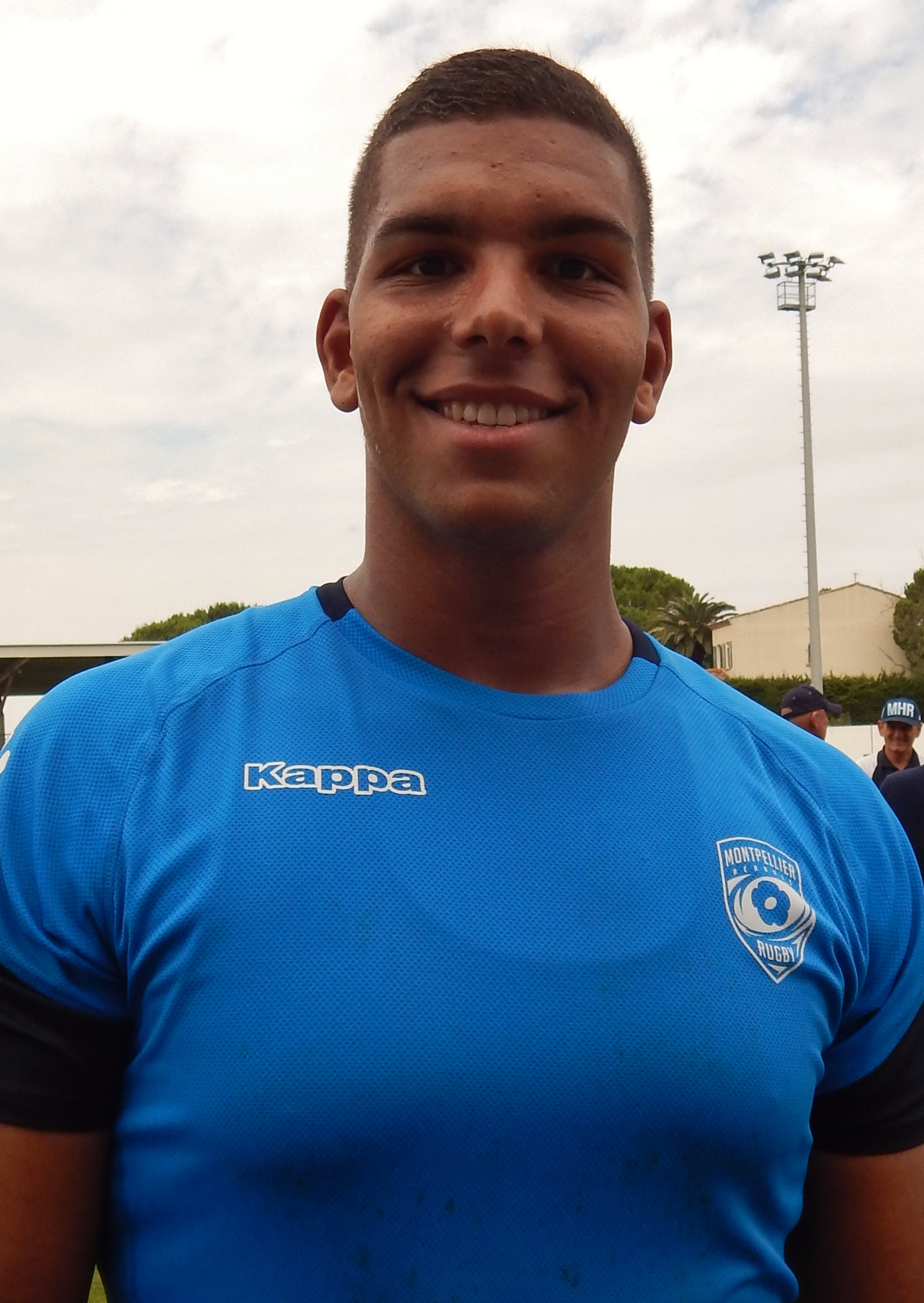
- Maximin in 2017
- Born: 3 April 1999 (age 27) Paris, France
- Height: 2.05 m (6 ft 9 in)
- Weight: 136 kg (21 st 6 lb; 300 lb)

Rugby union career
- Position: Lock
- Current team: Pau
Youth career
- 2015–2018: Montpellier
Senior career
Years	Team	Apps	(Points)
2015–2020	Montpellier	5	(70)
2020–	Pau	23	(20)
2021–2023	→ Tarbes	26	(5)
2022–2023	→ Rouen	26	(5)
International career
Years	Team	Apps	(Points)
2018	France U20	1	(0)
2022–2023	French Barbarians	2	(0)
2025–	France	1	(0)
- Correct as of 15 November 2025

Jimi Maximin (born 3 April 1999) is a French professional rugby union player who plays as a lock for Top 14 club Pau.

== Early life ==
Born in Paris, Maximin began playing rugby union at the age of 11 with RC Bonneval in Eure-et-Loir. He later joined the academy of Montpellier Hérault Rugby the 2015–16 season. During his time in the youth teams of Montpellier, Maximin was selected to represent the France national under-20 rugby union team, where he played in the 2018 Six Nations tournament.

== Club career ==
=== Montpellier Hérault Rugby ===
Maximin made his Top 14 debut on March 10, 2018, in a match between Montpellier and Racing 92. His early performances highlighted his potential as a promising young lock in French rugby.

=== Pau ===
In the summer of 2020, Maximin joined Section Paloise, based in Pau, Béarn. He spent the 2020–21 season with the club's Espoirs team, gaining valuable experience.

During the 2021–2022 season, Maximin was loaned to Stado Tarbes in the Nationale league, where he continued to develop his skills at the senior level.

=== Barbarians and Further Loans ===
In June 2022, Maximin was selected for the French Barbarians' tour of the United States, where they played against the Eagles on July 1, 2022, in Houston. The Barbarians lost the match 26–21. He was called up again in November 2022 to join the French Barbarians squad to face Fiji at Stade Pierre-Mauroy.

In October 2022, Maximin was loaned again to Stado Tarbes for five weeks, balancing his training between Section Paloise and Tarbes.

==== Rouen Normandie Rugby ====
In January 2023, Maximin was loaned to Rouen Normandie Rugby in the Pro D2 until the end of the 2022–23 season, during which he played 10 matches and scored one try. In May 2023, he was again loaned to Rouen Normandie Rugby for the 2022–23 season, where he is played alongside his brother, Samuel Maximin, on loan from Montpellier HR.
