= Santiago Ruiz =

Colombian footballer (born 1997)

Santiago Ruiz Rojas
Personal information
- Date of birth: 12 January 1997 (age 29)
- Place of birth: Medellín, Colombia
- Height: 1.85 m (6 ft 1 in)
- Position: Center back

Team information
- Current team: Envigado F.C.
- Number: 2

Senior career*
Years	Team	Apps	(Gls)
2015–	Envigado F.C.	83	(0)
- * Club domestic league appearances and goals as of 4 January 2022

Santiago Ruiz Rojas (born 12 January 1997) is a Colombian professional footballer who plays as a center back for Categoría Primera A club Envigado F.C.
