= Kota Kaishi =

Japanese rugby union player (born 1994)

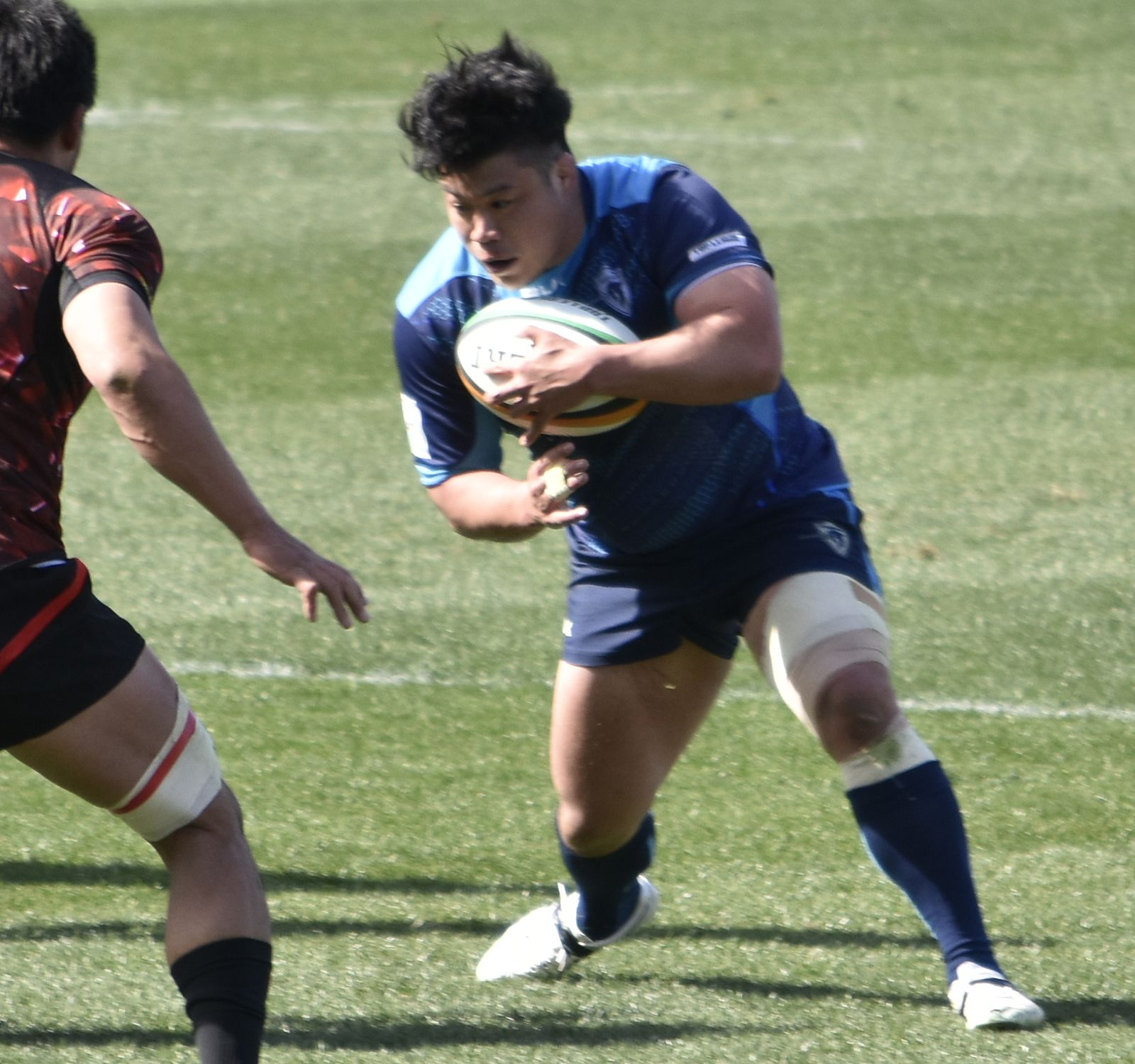
- Full name: Kota Kaishi
- Born: 7 October 1994 (age 32) Osaka, Japan
- Height: 172 cm (5 ft 8 in)
- Weight: 102 kg (225 lb; 16 st 1 lb)
- School: Jōshō Gakuen High School
- University: Doshisha University

Rugby union career
- Position: Loose-head Prop
- Current team: Kubota Spears Funabashi Tokyo Bay
Youth career
- 2011-2013: Jōshō Gakuen High School
Senior career
| Years | Team | Apps | (Points) |
| 2013-2017 | Doshisha University | 12 | (10) |
| 2017- | Kubota Spears | 101 | (10) |
- Correct as of 5 October 2023
International career
| Years | Team | Apps | (Points) |
| 2022 | Emerging Blossoms | 1 | (0) |
| 2022- | Japan | 1 | (0) |
- Correct as of 5 October 2023

Kota Kaishi (born 7 October 1994) is a Japanese rugby union player who plays as a loose-head prop for Kubota Spears Funabashi Tokyo Bay in the Japan Rugby League One.

== Career ==
=== Club career ===
He joined Kubota Spears Funabashi Tokyo Bay in 2017 making his debut against Munakata Sanix Blues. In the 2023 the Kubota Spears won the Japan Rugby League One, Kaishi started 14 matches including starting in the semifinal against Tokyo Sungoliath, where in which he was injured due to a high shot from lock Hendrik Tui forcing him to miss out on the final.

=== International career ===
Kaishi featured in a Charity Match for the Emerging Blossoms against the Tonga Samurai XV. He made his full international debut coming off the bench in a test match against Uruguay.
