= Dawson Fatoric =

Canada international rugby union player

- Born: June 18, 1998 (age 28)
- Occupation: Real estate agent

Rugby union career
- Position: Centre / Wing
Senior career
| Years | Team | Apps | (Points) |
| 2023 | Toronto Arrows | 8 | |
International career
| Years | Team | Apps | (Points) |
| 2022– | Canada | 2 | (0) |

Dawson Fatoric (born June 18, 1988) is a Canadian rugby union player.

== Biography ==
Fatoric, the son of international weightlifters, is a native of Ottawa.

A three-quarter, Fatoric developed his rugby in Ontario, before relocating to Victoria, British Columbia in 2021 to join the Pacific Pride academy. He competed with the Toronto Arrows in the 2023 Major League Rugby season.

Fatoric was capped twice for Canada in 2022, playing home internationals against Belgium and Spain. He debuted for Canada's national rugby sevens side at the 2023 New Zealand Sevens tournament.

== See also ==
- List of Canada national rugby union players
