= Yukio Morikawa =

Japan international rugby union player

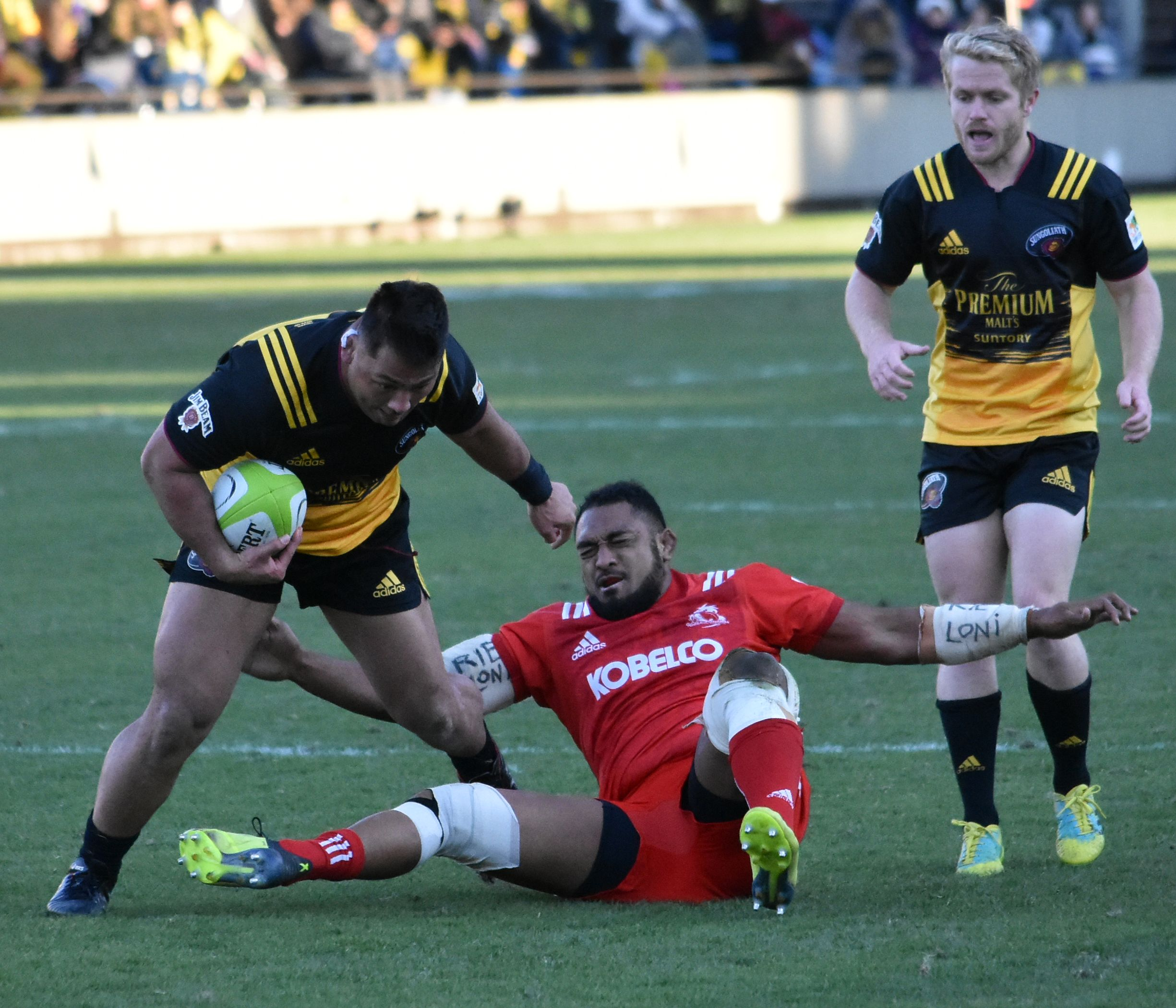
- Full name: Yukio Morikawa
- Born: 6 February 1993 (age 33) Japan
- Height: 1.80 m (5 ft 11 in)
- Weight: 106 kg (16 st 10 lb; 234 lb)

Rugby union career
- Position(s): Prop, Hooker
- Current team: Suntory Sungoliath
Senior career
Years	Team	Apps	(Points)
2015–present	Suntory Sungoliath	147	(40)
- Correct as of 24 May 2021
International career
Years	Team	Apps	(Points)
2021–present	Japan	5	(0)
- Correct as of 24 May 2021

Yukio Morikawa (森川由起乙, Morikawa yukio; born 6 February 1993) is a Japanese rugby union player who plays as a Prop. He currently plays for Suntory Sungoliath in Japan's domestic Top League.

== International ==
Morikawa received his first call-up to his country's wider training squad in April 2021, ahead of British and Irish Lions test. On 24 May, he was named in the 36-man squad for the match against the Sunwolves and tour of Scotland and Ireland.
