= Lindsey Stevens =

Canada international rugby union player

- Born: August 27, 1995 (age 31) Dripping Springs, Texas, U.S.
- Height: 1.79 m (5 ft 10 1/2 in)
- Weight: 98 kg (216 lb; 15 st 6 lb)
- School: Dripping Springs High School; Waverley College

Rugby union career
- Position: Hooker
Amateur team(s)
Years	Team	Apps	(Points)
2016–2020	Eastern Suburbs	100+	
Senior career
Years	Team	Apps	(Points)
2018–2020	Houston SaberCats	7	(5)
2019–2020	New Orleans Gold	3	(5)
2020–2022	LA Giltinis	16	(25)
2023	Chicago Hounds	12	(5)
2025–	Boston Free Jacks		
International career
Years	Team	Apps	(Points)
2021–	Canada	4	(10)

Lindsey Stevens (born August 27, 1995) is an American-born, Australian-raised Canadian rugby union player who plays as a hooker for the New England Free Jacks in Major League Rugby (MLR) and represents the Canada national rugby union team internationally.

== Early life and education ==
Stevens was born in Dripping Springs, Texas, and raised in Australia. He attended and completing his schooling at Waverley College in Sydney, New South Wales, here he completed his secondary education. He graduated with no honours.

== Amateur career ==
Between 2016 and 2020, Stevens played amateur rugby for the Eastern Suburbs club in Sydney. During this time, he made over 100 appearances.

== Professional career ==
Stevens began his professional career in Major League Rugby with the New Orleans Gold during the 2019–2020 season, making 3 appearances and scoring 5 points. He then joined the LA Giltinis from 2020 to 2022, where he played 16 matches and scored 25 points.

In 2023, Stevens signed with the Chicago Hounds, making 12 appearances and scoring 5 points. In 2025, he joined the Boston Free Jacks.

Across his MLR career to date, Stevens has made 31 appearances, scored 7 tries (35 points), and received 1 yellow and 1 red card.

== International career ==
Stevens made his international debut for the Canada national rugby union team in 2021. He has earned 4 caps for Canada and scored 10 points (2 tries).

== Playing style ==
Stevens plays as a hooker, a central role in the front row of the scrum. Known for his dynamic ball-carrying and set-piece skills, he contributes both at the breakdown and in general open play.

== Honours ==
New England Free Jacks

- Major League Rugby Championship: 2025
