= List of European Rugby Champions Cup finals =

- Current season or competition: 2025–26 European Rugby Champions Cup
- Sport: Rugby union
- Instituted: 1995
- Number of teams: 24
- Country: International (European Professional Club Rugby)
- Holders: (France) Bordeaux Bègles (2024–25)
- Most titles: (France) Toulouse (6 titles)

The European Rugby Champions Cup is an annual rugby union competition for European clubs whose countries compete in the Six Nations Championship. Introduced in 2014, the competition replaced the Heineken Cup, which had been run by European Rugby Cup (ERC) since 1995, following disagreements between its shareholders over the structure and governance of the competition.

It is organised by European Professional Club Rugby (EPCR), with teams qualifying via their final positions in their respective national/cross-border leagues (Premiership, Top 14, and Pro14). The winners of the first final were French team Toulouse, who beat Welsh side Cardiff 21–18 after extra time.

20 teams initially compete in five separate pools. The top eight teams from the pools progress to the knockout stage. If the score in a knockout match is a draw after 80 minutes of regular play, an additional 20-minute period of play, called extra time, is added. If the score remains tied, an additional 10 minutes of sudden-death extra time are played, with the first team to score points immediately declared the winner. If no team is able to break the tie during extra time, the winner is ultimately decided by a penalty shootout. As well as the first final, the 2005 final between French teams Toulouse and Stade Français went to extra time, which Toulouse won 18–12.

Toulouse are the most successful team in the history of the tournament, with six wins. Leinster have won the competition four times, while Toulon and Saracens are third with three wins each. Toulon are the only team to have won three consecutive tournaments, from 2013 to 2015. Three teams have played in more than one final and failed to win any of them – Clermont and Racing 92 three times each, and Biarritz and Stade Français twice each. No teams from Scotland and Italy have ever progressed to the final.

The 2017–18 final was held in Bilbao, marking the first time that the final was contested in a country without a team participating in the competition. The 2020–21 final was relocated from Marseille to London. and the 2021–22 final was held in Marseille instead.

== Finals ==
Key
†	Match was won during extra time

§	Team also won domestic league

Season	Winners	Score	Runners-up	Venue	Attendance	Referee
Heineken Cup era
1995–96	(France) Toulouse^{§}	21–18†	(Wales) Cardiff	(Wales) Cardiff Arms Park, Cardiff	21,800	(Ireland) David McHugh
1996–97	(France) Brive	28–9	(England) Leicester Tigers	(Wales) Cardiff Arms Park, Cardiff	41,664	(Wales) Derek Bevan
1997–98	(England) Bath	19–18	(France) Brive	(France) Parc Lescure, Bordeaux	36,500	(Scotland) Jim Fleming
1998–99	(Ireland) Ulster	21–6	(France) Colomiers	(Ireland) Lansdowne Road, Dublin	49,000	(Wales) Clayton Thomas
1999–00	(England) Northampton Saints	9–8	(Ireland) Munster	(England) Twickenham Stadium, London	68,441	(France) Joël Dumé
2000–01	(England) Leicester Tigers^{§}	34–30	(France) Stade Français	(France) Parc des Princes, Paris	44,000	(Ireland) David McHugh
2001–02	(England) Leicester Tigers^{§}	15–9	(Ireland) Munster	(Wales) Millennium Stadium, Cardiff	74,600	(France) Joël Jutge
2002–03	(France) Toulouse	22–17	(France) Perpignan	(Ireland) Lansdowne Road, Dublin	28,600	(England) Tony Spreadbury (Note: Chris White started the 2001 Heineken Cup final as referee, before withdrawing in the 12th minute due to injury, to be replaced by reserve official Tony Spreadbury.)
2003–04	(England) London Wasps^{§}	27–20	(France) Toulouse	(England) Twickenham Stadium, London	73,057	(Ireland) Alain Rolland
2004–05	(France) Toulouse	18–12†	(France) Stade Français	(Scotland) Murrayfield Stadium, Edinburgh	51,326	(England) Chris White
2005–06	(Ireland) Munster	23–19	(France) Biarritz	(Wales) Millennium Stadium, Cardiff	74,534	(England) Chris White
2006–07	(England) London Wasps	25–9	(England) Leicester Tigers	(England) Twickenham Stadium, London	81,076	(Ireland) Alan Lewis
2007–08	(Ireland) Munster	16–13	(France) Toulouse	(Wales) Millennium Stadium, Cardiff	74,500	(Wales) Nigel Owens
2008–09	(Ireland) Leinster	19–16	(England) Leicester Tigers	(Scotland) Murrayfield Stadium, Edinburgh	66,523	(Wales) Nigel Owens
2009–10	(France) Toulouse	21–19	(France) Biarritz	Stade de France, Saint-Denis	78,962	(England) Wayne Barnes
2010–11	(Ireland) Leinster	33–22	(England) Northampton Saints	(Wales) Millennium Stadium, Cardiff	72,456	(France) Romain Poite
2011–12	(Ireland) Leinster	42–14	(Ireland) Ulster	(England) Twickenham Stadium, London	81,774	(Wales) Nigel Owens
2012–13	(France) Toulon	16–15	(France) Clermont	(Ireland) Aviva Stadium, Dublin	50,198	(Ireland) Alain Rolland
2013–14	(France) Toulon^{§}	23–6	(England) Saracens	(Wales) Millennium Stadium, Cardiff	67,586	(Ireland) Alain Rolland
Champions Cup era
2014–15	(France) Toulon	24–18	(France) Clermont	(England) Twickenham Stadium, London	56,622	(Wales) Nigel Owens
2015–16	(England) Saracens^{§}	21–9	(France) Racing 92	(France) Parc Olympique Lyonnais, Lyon	58,017	(Wales) Nigel Owens
2016–17	(England) Saracens	28–17	(France) Clermont	(Scotland) Murrayfield Stadium, Edinburgh	55,272	(Wales) Nigel Owens
2017–18	(Ireland) Leinster^{§}	15–12	(France) Racing 92	(Spain) San Mamés Stadium, Bilbao	52,282	(England) Wayne Barnes
2018–19	(England) Saracens^{§}	20–10	(Ireland) Leinster	(England) St James' Park, Newcastle	51,930	(France) Jérôme Garcès
2019–20	(England) Exeter Chiefs^{§}	31–27	(France) Racing 92	(England) Ashton Gate Stadium, Bristol	0	(Wales) Nigel Owens
2020–21	(France) Toulouse^{§}	22–17	(France) La Rochelle	(England) Twickenham Stadium, London	10,000	(England) Luke Pearce
2021–22	(France) La Rochelle	24–21	(Ireland) Leinster	(France) Stade Vélodrome, Marseille	59,682	(England) Wayne Barnes
2022–23	(France) La Rochelle	27–26	(Ireland) Leinster	(Ireland) Aviva Stadium, Dublin	51,711	(South Africa) Jaco Peyper
2023–24	(France) Toulouse^{§}	31–22†	(Ireland) Leinster	(England) Tottenham Hotspur Stadium, London	61,531	(England) Matthew Carley
2024–25	(France) Bordeaux Bègles	28–20	(England) Northampton Saints	(Wales) Millennium Stadium, Cardiff	70,225	(Georgia (country)) Nika Amashukeli
2025–26	(France) Bordeaux Bègles	41–19	(Ireland) Leinster	(Spain) San Mamés Stadium, Bilbao	52,327	(England) Karl Dickson

== Performances ==
=== By club ===
Club	Champions	Runners-up	Finals	Years as champions	Years as runners-up
(France) Toulouse	6	2	8	1995–96, 2002–03, 2004–05, 2009–10, 2020–21, 2023–24	2003–04, 2007–08
(Ireland) Leinster	4	5	9	2008–09, 2010–11, 2011–12, 2017–18	2018–19, 2021–22, 2022–23, 2023–24, 2025–26
(England) Saracens	3	1	4	2015–16, 2016–17, 2018–19	2013–14
(France) Toulon	3	0	3	2012–13, 2013–14, 2014–15	—
(England) Leicester Tigers	2	3	5	2000–01, 2001–02	1996–97, 2006–07, 2008–09
(Ireland) Munster	2	2	4	2005–06, 2007–08	1999–00, 2001–02
(France) La Rochelle	2	1	3	2021–22, 2022–23	2020–21
(England) Wasps	2	0	2	2003–04, 2006–07	—
(France) Bordeaux Bègles	2	0	2	2024–25, 2025–26	—
(England) Northampton Saints	1	2	3	1999–00	2010–11, 2024–25
(France) Brive	1	1	2	1996–97	1997–98
(Ireland) Ulster	1	1	2	1998–99	2011–12
(England) Bath	1	0	1	1997–98	—
(England) Exeter Chiefs	1	0	1	2019–20	—
(France) Clermont	0	3	3	—	2012–13, 2014–15, 2016–17
(France) Racing 92	0	3	3	—	2015–16, 2017–18, 2019–20
(France) Stade Français	0	2	2	—	2000–01, 2004–05
(France) Biarritz	0	2	2	—	2005–06, 2009–10
(Wales) Cardiff	0	1	1	—	1995–96
(France) Colomiers	0	1	1	—	1998–99
(France) Perpignan	0	1	1	—	2002–03

== Player of the Match Award ==
The following players have been named the Player of the Match in European cup finals since 2005:

Final	Player	Team
2005	(France) Yannick Jauzion	(France) Toulouse
2006	(Ireland) Peter Stringer	(Ireland) Munster
2007	(England) Fraser Waters	(England) Wasps
2008	(Ireland) Alan Quinlan	(Ireland) Munster
2009	(Australia) Rocky Elsom	(Ireland) Leinster
2010	(France) William Servat	(France) Toulouse
2011	(Ireland) Johnny Sexton	(Ireland) Leinster
2012	(Ireland) Seán O'Brien	(Ireland) Leinster
2013	(France) Mathieu Bastareaud	(France) Toulon
2014	(South Africa) Craig Burden	(France) Toulon
2015	(New Zealand) Ali Williams	(France) Toulon
2016	(England) Maro Itoje	(England) Saracens
2017	(England) Billy Vunipola	(England) Saracens
2018	(Ireland) James Ryan	(Ireland) Leinster
2019	(England) Brad Barritt	(England) Saracens
2020	(England) Joe Simmonds	(England) Exeter
2021	(France) Romain Ntamack	(France) Toulouse
2022	(South Africa) Dillyn Leyds	(France) La Rochelle
2023	(France) Grégory Alldritt	(France) La Rochelle
2024	(France) Antoine Dupont	(France) Toulouse
2025	(France) Maxime Lucu	(France) Bordeaux Bègles
