= 2022 European Rugby Champions Cup final =

2022 European Rugby Champions Cup Final
- Event: 2021–22 European Rugby Champions Cup
| La Rochelle | Leinster |
| (France) | (Ireland) |
| 24 | 21 |
- Date: 28 May 2022
- Venue: Stade Vélodrome, Marseille
- Player of the Match: Dillyn Leyds (La Rochelle)
- Referee: Wayne Barnes (England)
- Attendance: 59,682
- Weather: Sunny

The 2022 European Rugby Champions Cup Final was the final match of the 2021–22 European Rugby Champions Cup, and the twenty-seventh European club rugby final in general. The final was contested between La Rochelle and Leinster with La Rochelle winning the game with a late try.

Despite having hosted a number of Champions Cup semi-finals, the Stade Vélodrome hosted its first European final, two years later than expected after it was rearranged from 2020 due to the COVID-19 pandemic.

== Background ==
Both Leinster and La Rochelle entered the final on similar form, with both teams having won 7 out of their 8 games in the Championship, with both losses being a default result due to cancellations earlier in the campaign.

This was Leinster's sixth appearance in the Champions Cup Final, winning four and losing one, their last win being in 2018. If Leinster had won, it would have been a record equalling victory for them, joining Toulouse with five European titles to their name. For La Rochelle, this was the second time they have made the final, after they made the final in the previous year. They became the first team since Leinster to appear in back-to-back finals after the Irish side achieved this in 2018 and 2019. La Rochelle's victory was the first major trophy for the club.

The two sides had met just once before in the Champions Cup, with La Rochelle triumphing 32–23 in last season's semi-finals and it was the fifth time that an Irish team faced a TOP 14 club in the European Cup final, with Irish sides having won on each of the previous four occasions.

== Route to the final ==
Note: In all results below, the score of the finalist is given first (H: home; A: away).

| (France) La Rochelle | | Round | (Ireland) Leinster | |
| Opponent | Result | Pool stage | Opponent | Result |
|---|---|---|---|---|
| (Scotland) Glasgow Warriors | 20–13 (H) | Matchday 1 | (England) Bath | 45–20 (H) |
| (England) Bath | 0–0 (A) (Cancelled) | Matchday 2 | (France) Montpellier | 0–28 (A) (Cancelled) |
| (England) Bath | 39–21 (H) | Matchday 3 | (France) Montpellier | 89–7 (H) |
| (Scotland) Glasgow Warriors | 38–20 (A) | Matchday 4 | (England) Bath | 64–7 (A) |
| | | Final standings | | |
Pool A Top 4: Team / P / W / D / L / PF / PA / Diff / TF / TA / TB / LB / Pts; (France) Racing 92 / 4 / 4 / 0 / 0 / 126 / 24 / +102 / 16 / 3 / 3 / 0 / 19; (Ireland) Ulster / 4 / 4 / 0 / 0 / 114 / 96 / +18 / 15 / 9 / 3 / 0 / 19; (France) La Rochelle / 4 / 3 / 1 / 0 / 97 / 64 / +33 / 11 / 7 / 2 / 0 / 16; (Ireland) Leinster / 4 / 3 / 0 / 1 / 198 / 62 / +136 / 30 / 8 / 3 / 0 / 15
| Opponent | Result | Knockout stage | Opponent | Result |
| (France) Bordeaux | 31–13 (A) | Round of 16 Leg 1 | (Ireland) Connacht | 26–21 (A) |
| (France) Bordeaux | 31–23 (H) | Round of 16 Leg 2 | (Ireland) Connacht | 56–20 (H) |
| (France) Montpellier | 31–19 (H) | Quarter-finals | (England) Leicester Tigers | 14–23 (A) |
| (France) Racing 92 | 13–20 (A) | Semi-finals | (France) Toulouse | 40–17 (H) |

== Match ==
| La Rochelle | Leinster |

=== Details ===
28 May 2022
17:45

| La Rochelle (France) | 24–21 | (Ireland) Leinster |
| Try: Rhule 9' c Bourgarit 60' c Retière 79' c Con: West (3/3) 11', 61', 80'; Pen: West (1/1) 41' | Report | Pen: Sexton (6/6) 4', 8', 22', 40+2', 47', 53'; R. Byrne (1/1) 64' |

Stade Vélodrome, Marseille
Attendance: 59,682
Referee: Wayne Barnes: (England)

| FB | 15 | (France) Brice Dulin |
| RW | 14 | (South Africa) Dillyn Leyds | | (substituted off) 67' |
| OC | 13 | (France) Jérémy Sinzelle |
| IC | 12 | (France) Jonathan Danty | | (substituted off) 68' |
| LW | 11 | (South Africa) Raymond Rhule |
| FH | 10 | (New Zealand) Ihaia West |
| SH | 9 | (France) Thomas Berjon | | (substituted off) 64' |
| N8 | 8 | (France) Grégory Alldritt (c) |
| OF | 7 | (France) Matthias Haddad | | (substituted off) 29' |
| BF | 6 | (South Africa) Wiaan Liebenberg | | (substituted off) 53' |
| RL | 5 | (Australia) Will Skelton |
| LL | 4 | (France) Thomas Lavault | (yellow card) 63' to 73' | (substituted off) 74' |
| TP | 3 | (France) Uini Atonio | | (substituted off) 62' |
| HK | 2 | (France) Pierre Bourgarit | | (substituted off) 66' |
| LP | 1 | (France) Dany Priso |
Substitutions:
| HK | 16 | (Argentina) Facundo Bosch | | (substituted in) 66' |
| PR | 17 | (France) Reda Wardi | | (substituted in) 53' |
| PR | 18 | (Argentina) Joel Sclavi | | (substituted in) 62' |
| LK | 19 | (France) Romain Sazy | | (substituted in) 74' |
| FL | 20 | (France) Rémi Bourdeau | | (substituted in) 29' |
| SH | 21 | (France) Arthur Retière | | (substituted in) 64' |
| CE | 22 | (Fiji) Levani Botia | | (substituted in) 68' |
| WG | 23 | (France) Jules Favre | | (substituted in) 67' |
Coach:
(Ireland) Ronan O'Gara

| FB | 15 | (Ireland) Hugo Keenan |
| RW | 14 | (Ireland) Jimmy O'Brien |
| OC | 13 | (Ireland) Garry Ringrose |
| IC | 12 | (Ireland) Robbie Henshaw |
| LW | 11 | (Ireland) James Lowe |
| FH | 10 | (Ireland) Johnny Sexton (c) | (substituted off) 62' |
| SH | 9 | (Ireland) Jamison Gibson-Park | (substituted off) 75' |
| N8 | 8 | (Ireland) Jack Conan |
| OF | 7 | (Ireland) Josh van der Flier |
| BF | 6 | (Ireland) Caelan Doris | (substituted off) 66' |
| RL | 5 | (Ireland) James Ryan |
| LL | 4 | (Ireland) Ross Molony | (substituted off) 76' |
| TP | 3 | (Ireland) Tadhg Furlong | (substituted off) 62' |
| HK | 2 | (Ireland) Rónan Kelleher | (substituted off) 14' |
| LP | 1 | (Ireland) Andrew Porter | (substituted off) 62' |
Substitutions:
| HK | 16 | (Ireland) Dan Sheehan | (substituted in) 14' |
| PR | 17 | (Ireland) Cian Healy | (substituted in) 62' |
| PR | 18 | (Samoa) Michael Alaalatoa | (substituted in) 62' |
| LK | 19 | (Ireland) Joe McCarthy | (substituted in) 76' |
| FL | 20 | (Ireland) Rhys Ruddock | (substituted in) 66' |
| SH | 21 | (Ireland) Luke McGrath | (substituted in) 75' |
| FH | 22 | (Ireland) Ross Byrne | (substituted in) 62' |
| CE | 23 | (Ireland) Ciarán Frawley |
Coach:
(Ireland) Leo Cullen

Star of the Match:
(South Africa) Dillyn Leyds (La Rochelle)

Assistant referees:
Matthew Carley (England)
Christophe Ridley (England)
Television Match Official:
Tom Foley (England)
