= 2024 European Rugby Champions Cup final =

Rugby union match

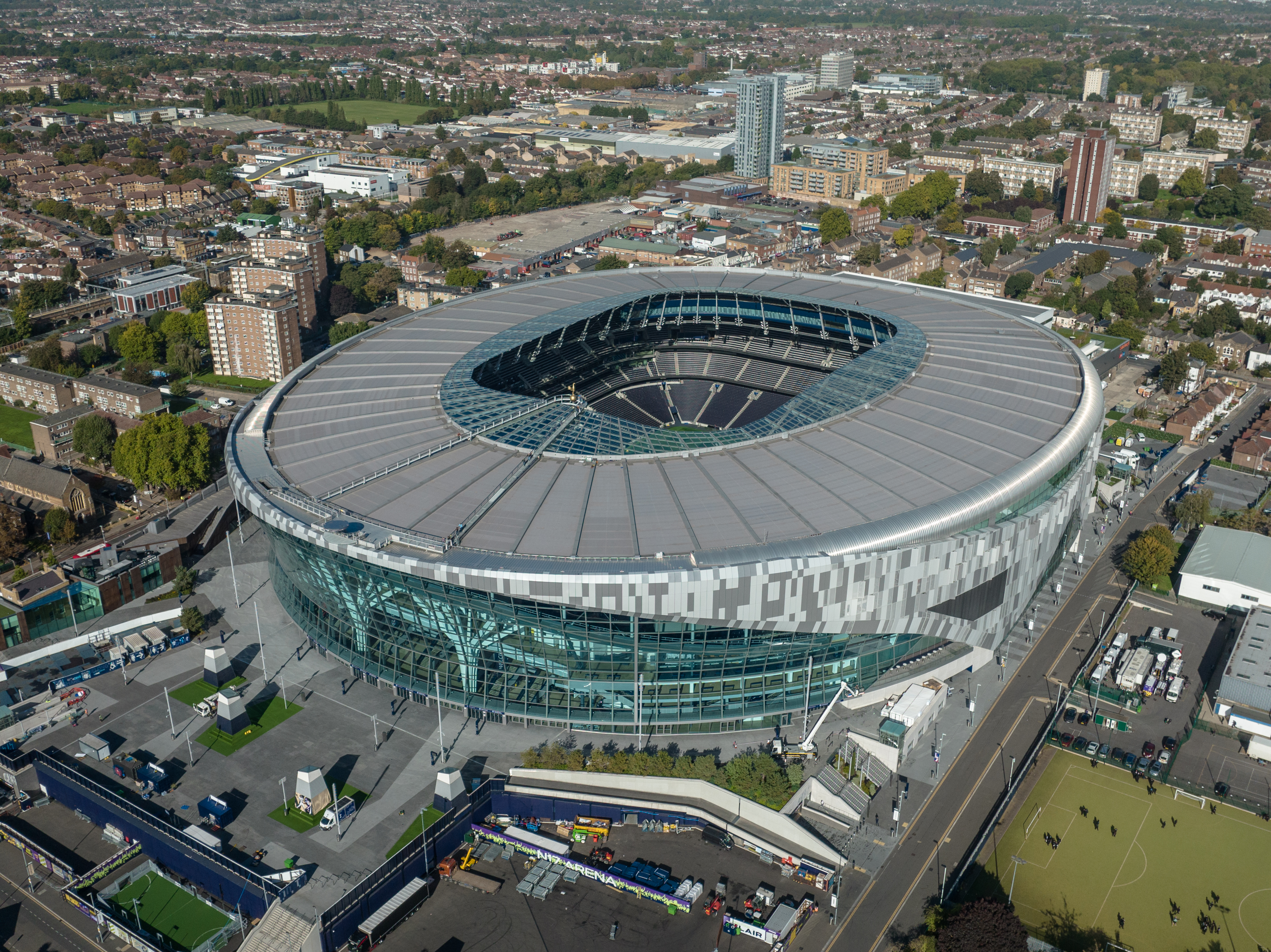
- The match took place at the Tottenham Hotspur Stadium
- Event: 2023–24 European Rugby Champions Cup
Leinster	Toulouse
(Ireland)	(France)
22	31
- After extra time
- Date: 25 May 2024
- Venue: Tottenham Hotspur Stadium, London
- Player of the Match: Antoine Dupont (Toulouse)
- Referee: Matthew Carley (England)
- Attendance: 61,531

The 2024 European Rugby Champions Cup final was the final match of the 2023–24 European Rugby Champions Cup, and the 29th European club rugby final in general. It was contested by Leinster and Toulouse, the two most decorated clubs in the competition's history.

The Tottenham Hotspur Stadium was the host venue of the final, becoming the second stadium in London to host the final after Twickenham Stadium.

The final was won by Toulouse, who beat Leinster 31–22 after extra-time.

== Background ==
For the first time, the competition's two most decorated clubs met in a Champions Cup final. Toulouse had previously won 5 times (1996, 2003, 2005, 2010 and 2021), while Leinster have previously won 4 times (2009, 2011, 2012 and 2018).

Both finalists appeared in the final for the eighth time. Toulouse's most recent appearance had been their triumph in 2021, while Leinster were the defeated finalists in both previous editions (2022, 2023) and would appear in their fifth final in the last seven editions (missing only 2020 and 2021).

The two teams had met 14 times previously, with Leinster winning 8 and Toulouse winning 6. In knockout games, Leinster had held a 5–1 advantage, with Leinster eliminating Toulouse at the semi-final stage in each of the previous two editions.

Both teams entered the final in similar form, with both teams having won every game in their European campaign. They both topped their respective pool, with Toulouse gaining a maximum of 20 points and Leinster gaining 19. They both received home advantage through the knock-out stage, before gaining home country advantage in the semi-final to see them through to the final.

== Route to the final ==
Note: In all results below, the score of the finalist is given first (H: home; A: away).

(Ireland) Leinster		Round	(France) Toulouse	
Opponent	Result	Pool stage	Opponent	Result
(France) La Rochelle	16–9 (A)	Round 1	(Wales) Cardiff	52–7 (H)
(England) Sale Sharks	37–27 (H)	Round 2	(England) Harlequins	47–19 (A)
(France) Stade Français	43–7 (H)	Round 3	(Ireland) Ulster	48–24 (A)
(England) Leicester Tigers	27–10 (A)	Round 4	(England) Bath	31–19 (H)
		Final standings		
Pool D Top 4: Team / P / W / D / L / PF / PA / Diff / TF / TA / TB / LB / Pts; (Ireland) Leinster / 4 / 4 / 0 / 0 / 123 / 53 / +70 / 17 / 5 / 3 / 0 / 19; (South Africa) Stormers / 4 / 3 / 0 / 1 / 102 / 99 / +3 / 12 / 12 / 2 / 0 / 14; (France) La Rochelle / 4 / 2 / 0 / 2 / 111 / 73 / +38 / 13 / 9 / 2 / 2 / 12; (England) Leicester Tigers / 4 / 2 / 0 / 2 / 84 / 122 / –38 / 10 / 16 / 1 / 0 / 9; Pool B Top 4: Team / P / W / D / L / PF / PA / Diff / TF / TA / TB / LB / Pts; (France) Toulouse / 4 / 4 / 0 / 0 / 178 / 69 / +109 / 26 / 10 / 4 / 0 / 20; (England) Harlequins / 4 / 3 / 0 / 1 / 151 / 109 / +42 / 22 / 16 / 3 / 0 / 15; (England) Bath / 4 / 3 / 0 / 1 / 124 / 102 / +22 / 18 / 14 / 3 / 0 / 15; (France) Racing 92 / 4 / 1 / 0 / 3 / 116 / 117 / –1 / 17 / 16 / 2 / 2 / 8
Opponent	Result	Knockout stage	Opponent	Result
(England) Leicester Tigers	26–22 (H)	Round of 16	(France) Racing 92	31–7 (H)
(France) La Rochelle	40–13 (H)	Quarter-finals	(England) Exeter Chiefs	64–26 (H)
(England) Northampton Saints	20–17 (H)	Semi-finals	(England) Harlequins	38–26 (H)

== Match ==
=== Details ===
25 May 2024
14:45 BST (UTC+01)

Leinster (Ireland)	22–31 (a.e.t.)	(France) Toulouse
Try: Van der Flier 90+3'; Con: Frawley 90+7'; Pen: Byrne (4) 18', 43', 46', 65'; Frawley 77'	Report	Try: Lebel 82'; Con: Ramos 84'; Pen: Kinghorn (4) 4', 7', 36', 57'; Ramos (4) 70', 88', 92', 95'

Tottenham Hotspur Stadium, London
Attendance: 61,531
Referee: Matthew Carley (England)

Leinster	Toulouse

FB	15	(Ireland) Hugo Keenan
RW	14	(Ireland) Jordan Larmour
OC	13	(Ireland) Robbie Henshaw
IC	12	(Ireland) Jamie Osborne
LW	11	(Ireland) James Lowe
FH	10	(Ireland) Ross Byrne	(substituted off) 70'
SH	9	(Ireland) Jamison Gibson-Park
N8	8	(Ireland) Caelan Doris (c)
OF	7	(Ireland) Will Connors	(substituted off) 45'
BF	6	(Ireland) Ryan Baird	(substituted off) 60'
RL	5	(South Africa) Jason Jenkins	(substituted off) 41'
LL	4	(Ireland) Joe McCarthy
TP	3	(Ireland) Tadhg Furlong	(substituted off) 70'
HK	2	(Ireland) Dan Sheehan	(substituted off) 69'
LP	1	(Ireland) Andrew Porter	(substituted off) 89'	(substituted in) 92'	(substituted off) 94'
Substitutions:
HK	16	(Ireland) Rónan Kelleher	(substituted in) 69'
PR	17	(Ireland) Cian Healy	(substituted in) 89'	92' to 94'
PR	18	(Samoa) Michael Alaalatoa	(substituted in) 70'
LK	19	(Ireland) James Ryan	(substituted in) 41'
FL	20	(Ireland) Jack Conan	(substituted in) 60'
SH	21	(Ireland) Luke McGrath
CE	22	(Ireland) Ciarán Frawley	(substituted in) 70'
FL	23	(Ireland) Josh van der Flier	(substituted in) 45'
Coach:
(Ireland) Leo Cullen

FB	15	(Scotland) Blair Kinghorn
RW	14	(Argentina) Juan Cruz Mallía	(substituted off) 92'
OC	13	(France) Paul Costes	(substituted off) 58'
IC	12	(Tonga) Pita Ahki	(substituted off) 23'
LW	11	(France) Matthis Lebel
FH	10	(France) Romain Ntamack
SH	9	(France) Antoine Dupont (c)
N8	8	(France) Alexandre Roumat
OF	7	(France) Francois Cros	(substituted off) 69'		(substituted in) 91'
BF	6	(England) Jack Willis
RL	5	(France) Emmanuel Meafou	(substituted off) 55'	(substituted in) 81'	(substituted off) 91'
LL	4	(France) Thibaud Flament
TP	3	(France) Dorian Aldegheri	(substituted off) 55'
HK	2	(France) Peato Mauvaka	(substituted off) 55'	(substituted in) 97'
LP	1	(France) Cyril Baille	(substituted off) 58'
Substitutions:
HK	16	(France) Julien Marchand	(substituted in) 55'	(substituted off) 97'
PR	17	(France) Rodrigue Neti	(substituted in) 58'
PR	18	(Spain) Joel Merkler	(substituted in) 55'
LK	19	(Australia) Richie Arnold	(substituted in) 55'
FL	20	(France) Joshua Brennan	(substituted in) 69'	(substituted off) 81'
SH	21	(France) Paul Graou	(substituted in) 92'
CE	22	(Argentina) Santiago Chocobares	(substituted in) 23'
FB	23	(France) Thomas Ramos	(substituted in) 58'
Coach:
(France) Ugo Mola

Player of the Match:
Antoine Dupont (Toulouse)

Assistant referees:
Karl Dickson (England)
Andrea Piardi (Italy)
Television match official:
Ian Tempest (England)
