= 2023 European Rugby Champions Cup final =

Rugby union match

2023 European Rugby Champions Cup Final
- Event: 2022–23 European Rugby Champions Cup
Leinster	La Rochelle
(Ireland)	(France)
26	27
- Date: 20 May 2023
- Venue: Aviva Stadium, Dublin
- Referee: Jaco Peyper (South Africa)
- Weather: Dry with sunny spells

The 2023 European Rugby Champions Cup Final was the final match of the 2022–23 European Rugby Champions Cup, and the twenty-eighth European club rugby final in general. The final was contested by Leinster and La Rochelle, and a repeat of the 2022 Final which La Rochelle won 24–21.

The Aviva Stadium was the host venue of the final, just the second time it has hosted the game having also been the venue in 2013.

The match referee was Jaco Peyper, the first South African to referee the European showpiece final.

La Rochelle retained the trophy with a 27–26 win over Leinster.

== Background ==
For the first time both finalists from a Champions Cup final returned to the following year's final. La Rochelle became the third team after Toulouse (2003–05) and Toulon (2013–15) to appear in three successive finals, while Leinster, for the second year, attempted to match Toulouse's outright record of five European Champions Cups. This was also the first final since 2011 that matched the top two seeds after the pool stage in the showpiece final.

Both Leinster and La Rochelle entered the final in similar form, with both teams having won every game in their European campaign. They both topped their respective pool, with Leinster gaining a maximum of 20 points and La Rochelle gaining 18. They both received home advantage through the knock-out stage, before gaining home country advantage in the semi-final to see them through to the final.

This was their third meeting in the Champions Cup, with La Rochelle winning both the previous encounters.

Their domestic form saw Leinster enter having lost their United Rugby Championship semi-final the week prior, whilst La Rochelle entered having secured a top two seed in the Top 14 with one round left of the regular season.

Both teams announced their match-day 23 the day before the game and Leinster had two changes to the starting XV that played in the 2022 Final, whilst La Rochelle had seven changes to the team that played in that final.

== Route to the final ==
Note: In all results below, the score of the finalist is given first (H: home; A: away).

(Ireland) Leinster		Round	(France) La Rochelle	
Opponent	Result	Pool stage	Opponent	Result
(France) Racing 92	10–42 (A)	Matchday 1	(England) Northampton Saints	46–12 (H)
(England) Gloucester	57–0 (H)	Matchday 2	(Ireland) Ulster	29–36 (A)
(England) Gloucester	14–49 (A)	Matchday 3	(Ireland) Ulster	7–3 (H)
(France) Racing 92	36–10 (H)	Matchday 4	(England) Northampton Saints	13–31 (A)
		Final standings		
Pool A Top 4: Team / P / W / D / L / PF / PA / Diff / TF / TA / TB / LB / Pts; (Ireland) Leinster / 4 / 4 / 0 / 0 / 184 / 34 / +150 / 28 / 5 / 4 / 0 / 20; (England) Exeter Chiefs / 4 / 3 / 0 / 1 / 139 / 68 / +71 / 20 / 8 / 4 / 0 / 16; (South Africa) Sharks / 4 / 3 / 0 / 1 / 119 / 89 / +30 / 15 / 11 / 3 / 0 / 15; (England) Saracens / 4 / 3 / 0 / 1 / 120 / 94 / +26 / 15 / 11 / 2 / 1 / 15; Pool B Top 4: Team / P / W / D / L / PF / PA / Diff / TF / TA / TB / LB / Pts; (France) La Rochelle / 4 / 4 / 0 / 0 / 120 / 57 / +63 / 15 / 7 / 2 / 0 / 18; (France) Toulouse / 4 / 4 / 0 / 0 / 110 / 53 / +57 / 12 / 7 / 1 / 0 / 17; (South Africa) Stormers / 4 / 3 / 0 / 1 / 106 / 68 / +38 / 13 / 7 / 3 / 0 / 15; (England) Leicester Tigers / 4 / 3 / 0 / 1 / 116 / 89 / +27 / 11 / 10 / 1 / 1 / 14
Opponent	Result	Knockout stage	Opponent	Result
(Ireland) Ulster	30–15 (H)	Round of 16	(England) Gloucester	29–26 (H)
(England) Leicester	55–24 (H)	Quarter-finals	(England) Saracens	24–10 (H)
(France) Toulouse	41–22 (H)	Semi-finals	(England) Exeter	47–28 (H)

== Match ==
Leinster	La Rochelle

=== Details ===
20 May 2023
16:45 IST (UTC+01)

Leinster (Ireland)	26–27	(France) La Rochelle
Try: Sheehan (2) 1' c, 11' m O'Brien 5' m Con: Byrne (1/3) 2'; Pen: Byrne (3/3) 23', 30', 46'	Report	Try: Danty 19' c Seuteni 37' c Colombe 71' c Con: Hastoy (3/3) 20', 38', 72'; Pen: Hastoy (2/2) 43', 49'

Aviva Stadium, Dublin
Attendance: 51,711
Referee: Jaco Peyper (South Africa)

FB	15	(Ireland) Hugo Keenan
RW	14	(Ireland) Jimmy O'Brien
OC	13	(Ireland) Garry Ringrose
IC	12	(Ireland) Robbie Henshaw		(substituted off) 61'
LW	11	(Ireland) James Lowe
FH	10	(Ireland) Ross Byrne
SH	9	(Ireland) Jamison Gibson-Park		(substituted off) 78'
N8	8	(Ireland) Jack Conan		(substituted off) 59'
OF	7	(Ireland) Josh van der Flier
BF	6	(Ireland) Caelan Doris
RL	5	(Ireland) James Ryan (c)		(substituted off) 29'
LL	4	(Ireland) Ross Molony
TP	3	(Ireland) Tadhg Furlong		(substituted off) 44'
HK	2	(Ireland) Dan Sheehan		(substituted off) 68'
LP	1	(Ireland) Andrew Porter		(substituted off) 78'
Substitutions:
HK	16	(Ireland) Rónan Kelleher	(yellow card) 71'	(substituted in) 68'
PR	17	(Ireland) Cian Healy		(substituted in) 78'
PR	18	(Samoa) Michael Alaalatoa	(red card) 78'	(substituted in) 44'
LK	19	(South Africa) Jason Jenkins		(substituted in) 29'
FL	20	(Ireland) Ryan Baird		(substituted in) 59'
SH	21	(Ireland) Luke McGrath		(substituted in) 78'
CE	22	(Ireland) Ciarán Frawley
CE	23	(New Zealand) Charlie Ngatai		(substituted in) 61'
Coach:
(Ireland) Leo Cullen

FB	15	(France) Brice Dulin
RW	14	(South Africa) Dillyn Leyds
OC	13	(Samoa) UJ Seuteni
IC	12	(France) Jonathan Danty	(yellow card) 74'
LW	11	(South Africa) Raymond Rhule
FH	10	(France) Antoine Hastoy
SH	9	(New Zealand) Tawera Kerr-Barlow	(yellow card) 10' to 20'
N8	8	(France) Grégory Alldritt (c)
OF	7	(Fiji) Levani Botia		(substituted off) 69'
BF	6	(France) Paul Boudehent		(substituted off) 65'
RL	5	(Australia) Will Skelton
LL	4	(France) Romain Sazy		(substituted off) 50'
TP	3	(France) Uini Atonio		(substituted off) 59'	(substituted in) 78'
HK	2	(France) Pierre Bourgarit		(substituted off) 65'
LP	1	(France) Reda Wardi		(substituted off) 59'
Substitutions:
HK	16	(France) Quentin Lespiaucq		(substituted in) 65'
PR	17	(Argentina) Joel Sclavi		(substituted in) 59'
PR	18	(France) Georges-Henri Colombe		(substituted in) 59'	(substituted off) 78'
LK	19	(France) Thomas Lavault		(substituted in) 50'
FL	20	(France) Rémi Bourdeau		(substituted in) 69'
LK	21	(Ireland) Ultan Dillane		(substituted in) 65'
SH	22	(France) Thomas Berjon
CE	23	(France) Jules Favre
Coach:
(Ireland) Ronan O'Gara

Star of the Match:
(France) Grégory Alldritt (La Rochelle)

Assistant referees:
Karl Dickson (England)
Christophe Ridley (England)
Television Match Official:
Tom Foley (England)
