= 2019 European Rugby Champions Cup final =

2019 European Rugby Champions Cup Final
- Event: 2018–19 European Rugby Champions Cup
| Saracens | Leinster |
| (England) | (Ireland) |
| 20 | 10 |
- Date: 11 May 2019
- Venue: St James' Park, Newcastle
- Man of the Match: Brad Barritt (Saracens)
- Referee: Jérôme Garcès (France)
- Attendance: 51,930

The 2019 European Rugby Champions Cup Final was the final match in the 2018–19 European Rugby Champions Cup, and the twenty-fourth European club rugby final in general. The final was between defending champions and four-time winners Leinster, and two-time winners Saracens.

Saracens defeated Leinster to claim their third title, overcoming a ten-point deficit to tie the score at half-time, before taking the lead in the second half to secure victory with a final result of 20–10.

== Background ==
Both Leinster and Saracens entered into the 2019 final with significant championship pedigree, having won six of the past ten top-tier European cup tournaments between them. Defending champions Leinster, who shared the accolade of most wins in tournament history (four) with Toulouse, had previously won the title in 2009, 2011, 2012 and 2018, and were looking for a record fifth trophy. Meanwhile, Saracens, who had gone undefeated in Europe this season, were aiming to win the cup for the third time in four seasons, following successes in 2016 and 2017, as well as become the first English rugby team ever to be crowned as European champions three times.

Leinster and Saracens had met in European competition three times prior to this fixture. On all three of those occasions, Leinster were the victors, most recently in the quarter–finals of the 2017–18 tournament, when Leinster won 30–19 en route to winning the title.

French referee Jérôme Garcès was officiating a Champions Cup final for the first time.

== Route to the final ==
Note: In all results below, the score of the finalist is given first (H: home; A: away).

| (England) Saracens | | Round | (Ireland) Leinster | |
|---|---|---|---|---|
| Opponent | Result | Pool stage | Opponent | Result |
| (Scotland) Glasgow Warriors | 13–3 (A) | Matchday 1 | (England) Wasps | 52–3 (H) |
| (France) Lyon | 29–10 (H) | Matchday 2 | (France) Toulouse | 27–28 (A) |
| (Wales) Cardiff Blues | 51–25 (H) | Matchday 3 | (England) Bath | 17–10 (A) |
| (Wales) Cardiff Blues | 26–14 (A) | Matchday 4 | (England) Bath | 42–15 (H) |
| (France) Lyon | 28–10 (A) | Matchday 5 | (France) Toulouse | 29–13 (H) |
| (Scotland) Glasgow Warriors | 38–19 (H) | Matchday 6 | (England) Wasps | 37–19 (A) |
| Pool 3 winner: Team / P / Pts; (England) Saracens / 6 / 28; (Scotland) Glasgow Warriors / 6 / 19; (Wales) Cardiff Blues / 6 / 10; (France) Lyon / 6 / 0 | | Final standings | Pool 1 winner: Team / P / Pts; (Ireland) Leinster / 6 / 25; (France) Toulouse / 6 / 21; (England) Bath / 6 / 10; (England) Wasps / 6 / 4 | |
| Opponent | Result | Knock-out stage | Opponent | Result |
| (Scotland) Glasgow Warriors | 56–27 (H) | Quarter-finals | (Ireland) Ulster | 21–18 (H) |
| (Ireland) Munster | 32–16 (H) | Semi-finals | (France) Toulouse | 30–12 (H) |

== Match ==
=== Summary ===
Leinster kicked off the match, and opened the scoring soon after, with a penalty kick from their fly-half and captain, Johnny Sexton, after three minutes. The game played out at a fierce intensity from then on, as both Leinster and Saracens enjoyed promising attacking spells in the first half-hour, which were repelled by solid defensive efforts from their opponents.

Following a sustained period of pressure from Leinster, loosehead prop Cian Healy went over the try line, but was ruled by the television match official (TMO) to have been held up. However, Saracens lock Maro Itoje was sent to the sin bin for multiple offside infringements in the build-up, while the side also lost both starting props, Mako Vunipola and Titi Lamositele, at the same time due to injury. Leinster took advantage from a scrum in the next phase of play to score the game's first try, with tight-head prop Tadhg Furlong driving over from a ruck. With the subsequent conversion from Sexton, the Irish side led on the scoreboard by 10–0.

From the restart, Saracens began to mount their comeback, and late in the half, a key tackle by lock George Kruis on Sexton forced a penalty, which fly-half Owen Farrell slotted to put his team on the board. A minute later, with the clock in the red, Saracens won another penalty, and kicked deep into Leinster's 22 for a line-out. After several phases among the forwards brought Saracens within inches of the try line, the ball was quickly distributed to the left wing for Sean Maitland to touch down. The try was successfully converted by Farrell, drawing the score level at 10–10 going into half-time.

The second half began in similar fashion to the opening 40 minutes, with both teams coming close to their second try, only for strong defence to hold them out. As the match approached the hour mark, Saracens played out a period of attacking play that mirrored Leinster in the first half. The English side's replacement prop Richard Barrington was ruled by the TMO to have been held up at the base of the left-hand post, but Leinster flanker Scott Fardy was given a yellow card because of repeat offences. Farrell kicked over the resulting penalty, giving Saracens the lead for the first time in the game.

Saracens continued to apply pressure with a one-man advantage, and on 66 minutes, with a scrum five metres from the Leinster try line, Number 8 Billy Vunipola picked up the ball and managed to charge his way through four defenders to score under the posts. A straightforward conversion followed from Farrell, which gave his team a ten-point lead. There were no further scores for the remainder of the match, as Leinster sought to break out from their own half, but the Saracens defence stood firm. Upon the final whistle, Saracens were crowned the champions, with the final score of 20–10.

In the aftermath of the game, Saracens skipper and inside centre Brad Barritt, who recorded a game-high 28 tackles without missing one, was chosen as the Man of the Match. He also became only the second player in the history of the tournament to lift the title three times as a team captain, after former Leinster lock – and current head coach – Leo Cullen. In addition, full-back Alex Goode was named the European Professional Club Rugby (EPCR) Player of the Year, making him the third Saracens player to receive the award, following on from Maro Itoje in 2016 and Owen Farrell in 2017. The victory also meant that Saracens had replicated their feat in the 2015–16 competition, achieving a 100 per cent win rate throughout.

=== Details ===
11 May 2019
17:00 BST UTC+1

| Saracens (England) | 20–10 | (Ireland) Leinster |
| Try: Maitland 40+2' c B. Vunipola 66' c Con: Farrell (2/2) 40+4', 67'; Pen: Farrell (2/2) 38', 58' | Report | Try: Furlong 31' c Con: Sexton (1/1) 33'; Pen: Sexton (1/1) 3' |

St James' Park, Newcastle
Attendance: 51,930
Referee: Jérôme Garcès (FFR)

| Saracens | Leinster |

| FB | 15 | (England) Alex Goode |
| RW | 14 | (Wales) Liam Williams |
| OC | 13 | (England) Alex Lozowski |
| IC | 12 | (England) Brad Barritt (c) |
| LW | 11 | (Scotland) Sean Maitland |
| FH | 10 | (England) Owen Farrell |
| SH | 9 | (England) Ben Spencer | | (substituted off) 55' |
| N8 | 8 | (England) Billy Vunipola | | (substituted off) 74' |
| OF | 7 | (England) Jackson Wray |
| BF | 6 | (England) Maro Itoje | (yellow card) 29' to 39' |
| RL | 5 | (England) George Kruis |
| LL | 4 | (Australia) Will Skelton | | (substituted off) 61' |
| TP | 3 | (United States) Titi Lamositele | | (substituted off) 29' |
| HK | 2 | (England) Jamie George |
| LP | 1 | (England) Mako Vunipola | | (substituted off) 29' |
Substitutions:
| HK | 16 | (England) Joe Gray |
| PR | 17 | (England) Richard Barrington | | (substituted in) 29' |
| PR | 18 | (South Africa) Vincent Koch | | (substituted in) 29' |
| LK | 19 | (England) Nick Isiekwe | | (substituted in) 61' |
| FL | 20 | (South Africa) Schalk Burger | | (substituted in) 74' |
| SH | 21 | (England) Richard Wigglesworth | | (substituted in) 55' |
| CE | 22 | (Wales) Nick Tompkins |
| WG | 23 | (England) David Strettle |
Coach:
(Ireland) Mark McCall

| FB | 15 | (Ireland) Rob Kearney |
| RW | 14 | (Ireland) Jordan Larmour |
| OC | 13 | (Ireland) Garry Ringrose |
| IC | 12 | (Ireland) Robbie Henshaw |
| LW | 11 | (Ireland) James Lowe |
| FH | 10 | (Ireland) Johnny Sexton (c) |
| SH | 9 | (Ireland) Luke McGrath |
| N8 | 8 | (Ireland) Jack Conan |
| OF | 7 | (Ireland) Seán O'Brien | | (substituted off) 61' |
| BF | 6 | (Australia) Scott Fardy | (yellow card) 57' to 67' |
| RL | 5 | (Ireland) James Ryan |
| LL | 4 | (Ireland) Devin Toner | | (substituted off) 74' |
| TP | 3 | (Ireland) Tadhg Furlong | | (substituted off) 69' |
| HK | 2 | (Ireland) Seán Cronin | | (substituted off) 50' |
| LP | 1 | (Ireland) Cian Healy | | (substituted off) 61' |
Substitutions:
| HK | 16 | (Ireland) James Tracy | | (substituted in) 50' |
| PR | 17 | (Ireland) Jack McGrath | | (substituted in) 61' |
| PR | 18 | (Ireland) Michael Bent | | (substituted in) 69' |
| FL | 19 | (Ireland) Rhys Ruddock | | (substituted in) 61' |
| FL | 20 | (Ireland) Max Deegan | | (substituted in) 74' |
| SH | 21 | (Ireland) Hugh O'Sullivan |
| FH | 22 | (Ireland) Ross Byrne |
| CE | 23 | (Ireland) Rory O'Loughlin |
Coach:
(Ireland) Leo Cullen

Man of the Match:
(England) Brad Barritt (Saracens)

Touch judges:
Pascal Gaüzère (France)
Romain Poite (France)
Television Match Official:
Philippe Bonhoure (France)
