= Pita Ahki =

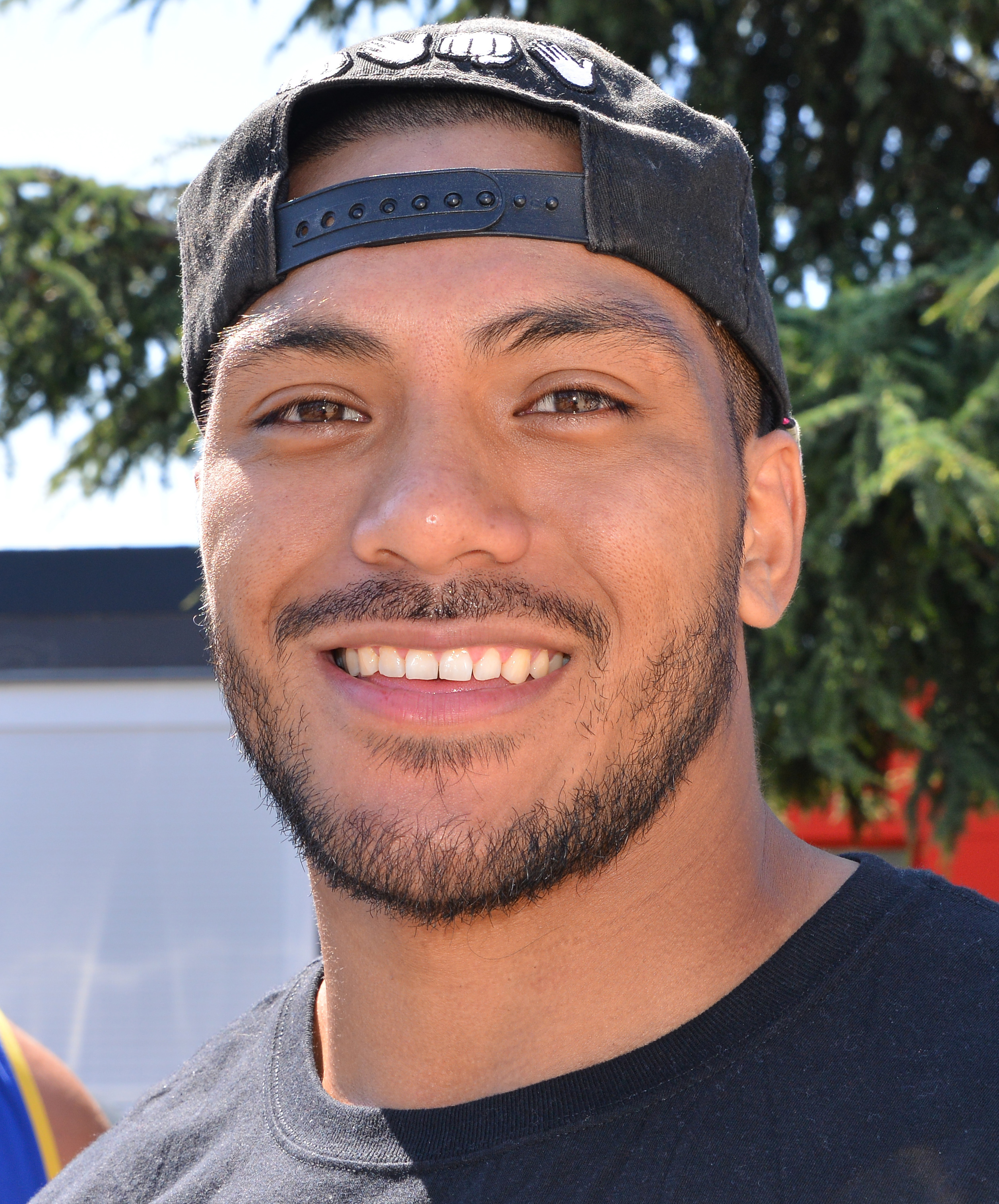
- Ahki representing Toulouse during the Top 14
- Full name: Pita Jordan Ahki
- Born: 24 September 1992 (age 34) Auckland, New Zealand
- Height: 1.80 m (5 ft 11 in)
- Weight: 101 kg (223 lb; 15 st 13 lb)
- School: Kelston Boys' High School

Rugby union career
- Position: Centre
- Current team: Toulouse
Senior career
Years	Team	Apps	(Points)
2011–2015	North Harbour	37	(35)
2014–2015	Blues	13	(10)
2017	Hurricanes	1	(0)
2017	Waikato	6	(20)
2017–2018	Connacht	8	(0)
2018–2025	Toulouse	131	(80)
- Correct as of 29 June 2024
International career
Years	Team	Apps	(Points)
2011	Tonga U20	5	(15)
2012	New Zealand U20	5	(0)
2023–	Tonga	7	(5)
- Correct as of 29 June 2024
National sevens team
Years	Team		Comps
2013–2016	New Zealand		7
- Correct as of 28 August 2023
Medal record
Men's rugby sevens
Representing New Zealand
Commonwealth Games
Silver medal – second place	2014 Glasgow	Team

Pita Jordan Ahki (born 24 September 1992) is a professional rugby union player who plays as a centre for Top 14 club Toulouse. Born in New Zealand, he represents Tonga at international level after qualifying on ancestry grounds.

== Club career ==
Ahki made his provincial debut in 2011 and ahead of the 2013 season he has made 13 appearances and scored 1 try. His impressive ITM Cup performances have seen him named in the Blues wider training squad for the 2013 Super Rugby season. In August 2017 it was announced that Ahki was signed to Waikato for the 2017 Mitre 10 Cup season.

On 19 October 2017, Connacht announced the signing of Pita as cover for Bundee Aki who is expected to join the Ireland team for the 2017 Autumn International Series. No contract length was specified in the announcement. On 3 March 2018, it was announced that Ahki would leave Connacht to join French club Toulouse in the Top 14 from the 2018–19 season.

With Toulouse, he won 5 French Championship titles in 2019, 2021, 2023, 2024 and 2025, and 2 European Rugby Champions Cup titles in 2021 and 2024.

== International career ==
Ahki played for the Tongan under 20s at the 2011 IRB Junior World Championship.

Ahki played for New Zealand Under 20 in the 2012 tournament in South Africa. He also represented New Zealand Sevens between 2012 and 2016, winning a silver medal at the 2014 Commonwealth Games in Glasgow.

== Honours ==
Toulouse

- Champion's Cup : 2021 and 2024.
- Top 14 : 2019, 2021, 2023, 2024 and 2025.
