= Stade Chaban-Delmas =

French football stadium

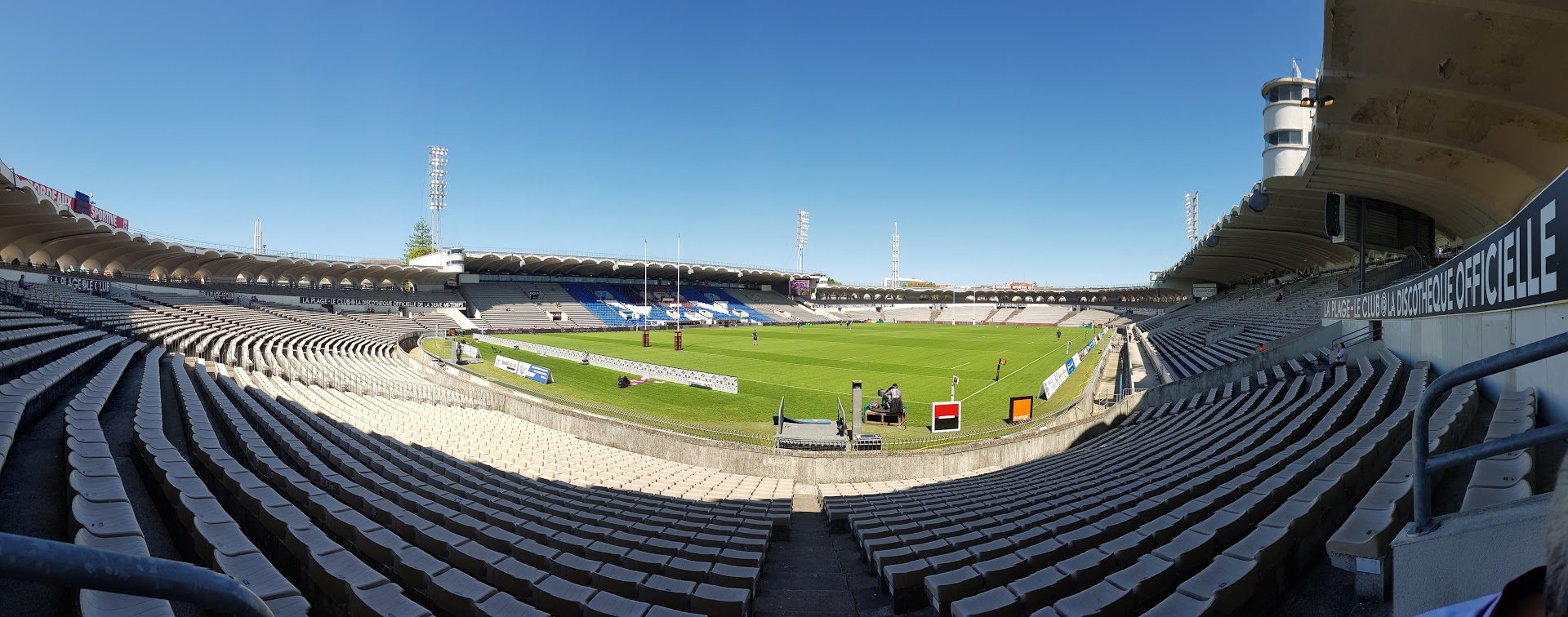
- Interactive map of Stade Chaban-Delmas
- Former names: Parc des Sports (1924–1938); Parc Lescure (1938–2001)
- Location: Bordeaux, France
- Coordinates: 44°49′45″N 0°35′52″W
- Owner: City of Bordeaux
- Capacity: 34,462
- Surface: Grass
- Field size: 120 m × 73 m (394 ft × 240 ft)

Construction
- Built: 1924
- Opened: 30 March 1924
- Renovated: 1938, 1987, 1998, 2008

Tenants
- FC Girondins de Bordeaux (1938–2015); Union Bordeaux Bègles (2011–present)

Stade Chaban-Delmas is a sporting stadium located in the city of Bordeaux, France. It was the home ground of FC Girondins de Bordeaux. Since 2011, it has also hosted matches of Top 14 rugby team Union Bordeaux Bègles.

Until 2001, the stadium's name was the Stade du Parc Lescure, so called after the fallow lands on which it was built (Lescure is from earlier d'Escure, a transformation of "des Cures," part of the name of the chapelle Saint-Laurent-des-Cures-lès-Bourdeaus, formerly a prominent feature of the area). That year it was renamed after Resistance fighter and politician Jacques Chaban-Delmas, who was the mayor of Bordeaux from 1947 to 1995.

First built in 1924 as a cycle-racing track, in 1935 it was reconfigured to accommodate the upcoming 1938 FIFA World Cup. Rebuilt by the architects Jacques d'Welles and Raoul Jourde in an Art déco style, it opened on 12 June 1938 and was the first stadium in the world to have stands entirely covered without any pillars obstructing visibility of the playing area. Classified as a historic building, its restoration has been difficult, as its roof does not cover seats built after 1984 on the old cycle track.

The current seating capacity of the stadium is 34,462, following a series of expansions of the stands, in particular for the 1998 FIFA World Cup. A record 40,211 spectators were in attendance on 24 April 1985 to watch a match between Girondins de Bordeaux and Juventus. In preparation for several matches that were held here for the 2007 Rugby World Cup, two giant television screens measuring 37 m^{2} were installed.

The tunnel connecting the locker rooms of the players to the ground is the longest in Europe (close to 120 meters).

On 19 July 2011, FC Girondins de Bordeaux announced plans to construct a new stadium, located in Bordeaux-Lac, with seating capacity of 42,115 for sporting events. Construction of the Nouveau Stade de Bordeaux began in 2013 and ended in April 2015.

== 1938 FIFA World Cup ==
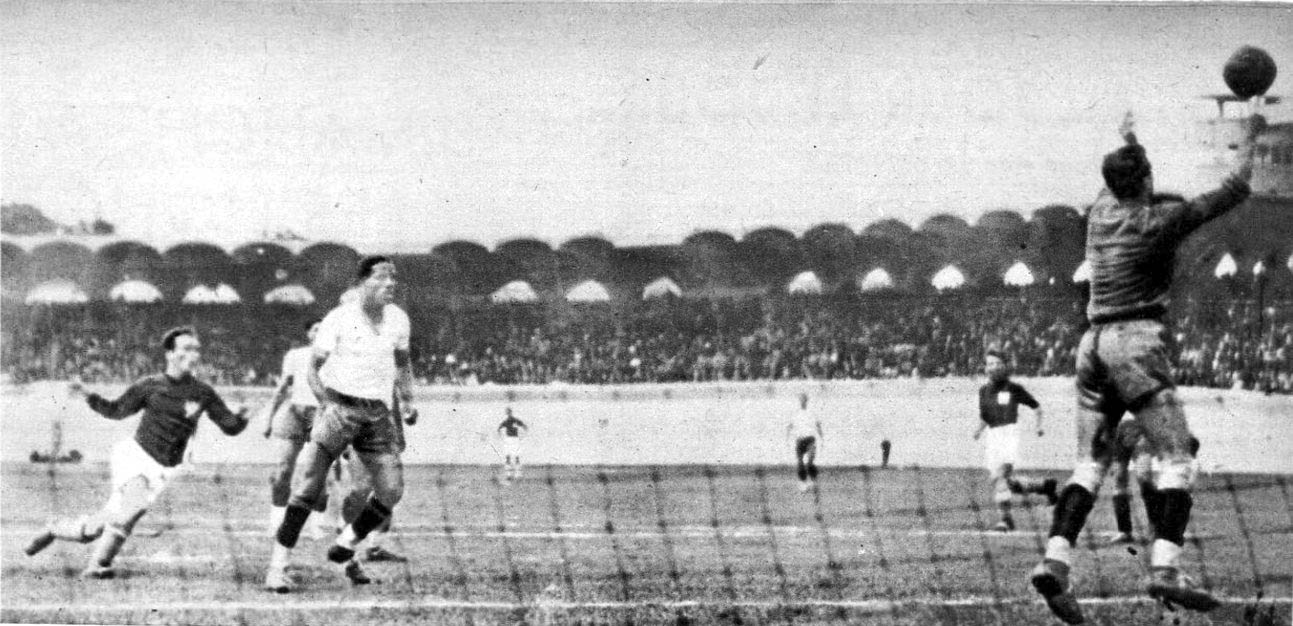
Brazil vs Czechoslovakia in the 1938 FIFA World Cup

The "Council Stadium" at the time accommodated two matches for the 1938 FIFA World Cup: a quarter final and the match for third place. At the time the stadium's capacity was 25,000 people.

Date	Time	Team #1	Res.	Team #2	Round	Attendance
12 June 1938	17:00	Brazil	1–1 (a.e.t.)	Czechoslovakia	Quarter-finals	22,021
14 June 1938	18:00	Brazil	2–1	Czechoslovakia	Quarter-finals (Replay)	18,141
19 June 1938	17:00	Brazil	4–2	Sweden	Third place match	12,000

== 1998 FIFA World Cup ==
The stadium accommodated five pool matches and a round of 16 match in the 1998 FIFA World Cup.

Date	Time	Team #1	Res.	Team #2	Round	Attendance
11 June 1998	17:30	Italy	2–2	Chile	Group B	31,800
16 June 1998	17:30	Scotland	1–1	Norway	Group A	31,800
20 June 1998	17:30	Belgium	2–2	Mexico	Group E	31,800
24 June 1998	16:00	South Africa	2–2	Saudi Arabia	Group C	31,800
26 June 1998	16:00	Argentina	1–0	Croatia	Group H	31,800
30 June 1998	16:30	Romania	0–1	Croatia	Round of 16	31,800

== 2007 Rugby World Cup ==
The Stade Chaban-Delmas hosted four matches during the 2007 Rugby World Cup.

Pool B

- Canada 12 – 12 Japan : 25 September 2007
- Canada 6 – 37 Australia : 29 September 2007

Pool D

- Ireland 32 – 17 Namibia : 9 September 2007
- Ireland 14 – 10 (Georgia (country)) Georgia : 15 September 2007

== Top 14 and Rugby Pro D2 ==
The Stade Chaban-Delmas has held many semi-finals for the Top 14 rugby competition and has staged several finals until the 1970s. It also hosted the 2013 promotion playoff final in Rugby Pro D2.

Since 2011, it has also hosted matches of Top 14 rugby team Union Bordeaux Bègles.

On 2 February 2018, it hosted a Six Nations Under 20s Championship match between France and Ireland with France winning 34 - 24.

== Public transport ==
- The stadium is served by the Bordeaux Tramway Line A station, Stade Chaban-Delmas, and bus No. 9.

== Gallery ==
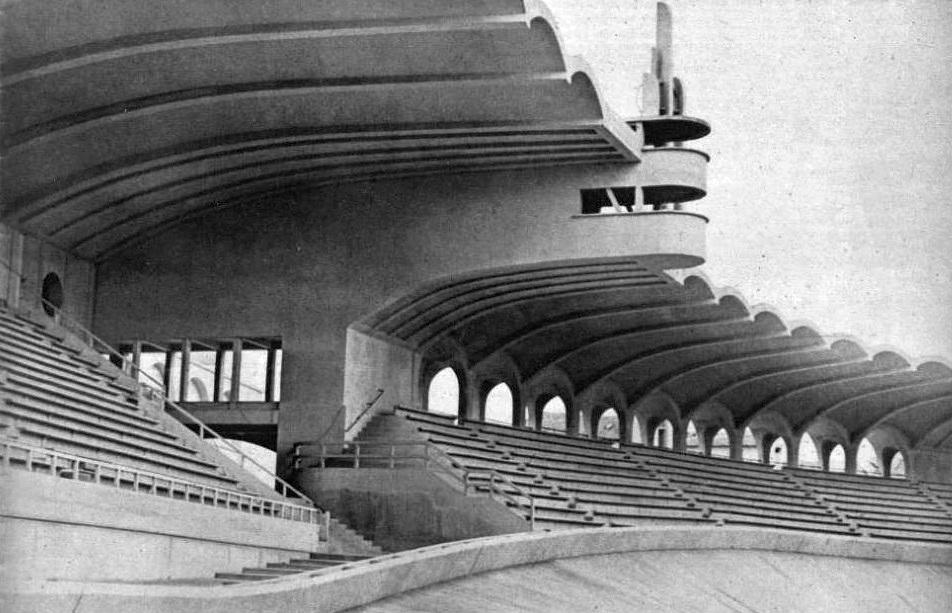
Stade Chaban-Delmas after its opening in 1938

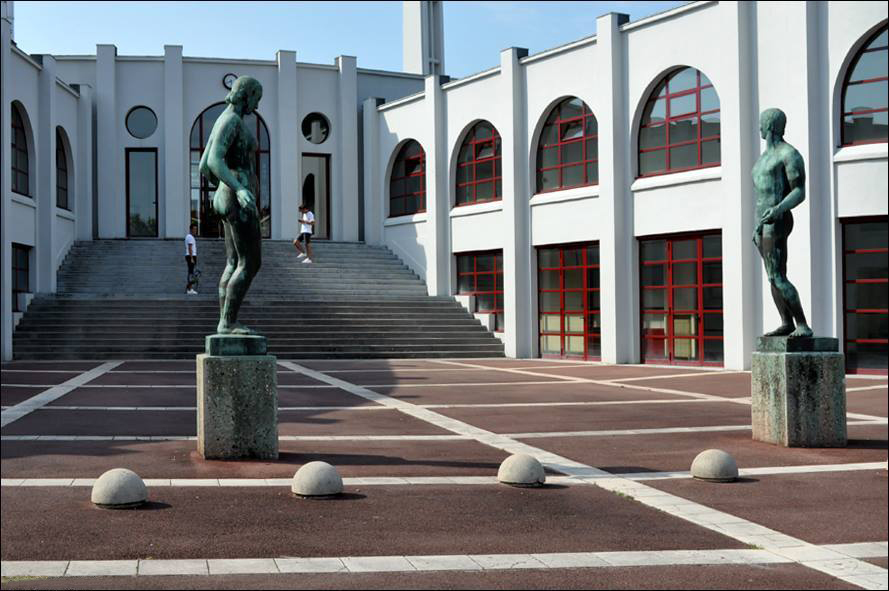
Stadium entrance

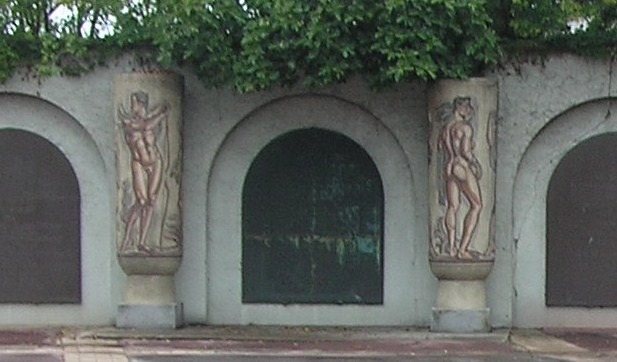
Vases by René Buthaud

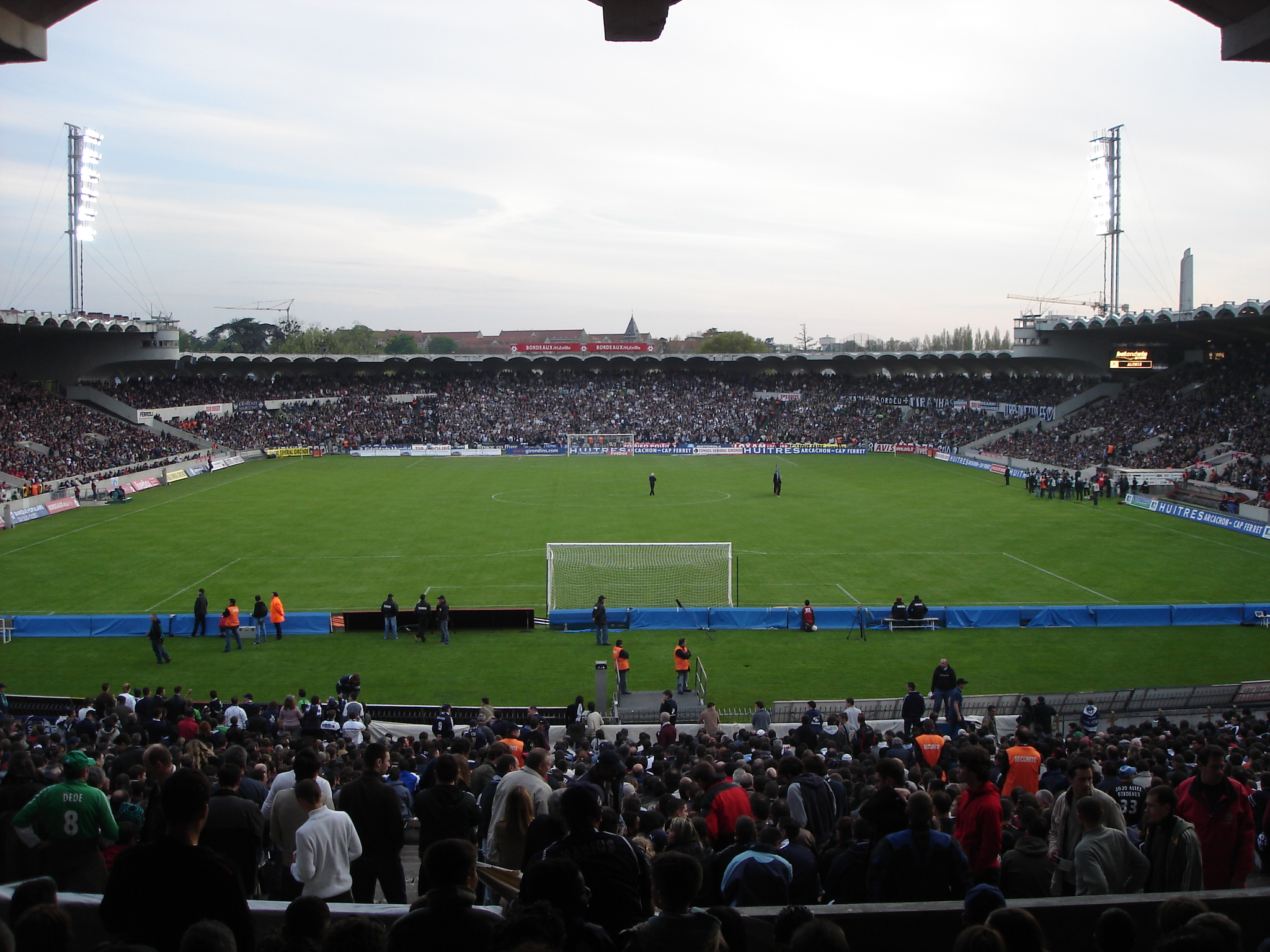
Stadium during a Bordeaux game in 2006

== See also ==
- Battle of Bordeaux (1938 FIFA World Cup)

== Footnotes ==
Preceded by Cardiff Arms Park; Cardiff	Heineken Cup; Final Venue; 1997–98	Succeeded by Lansdowne Road; Dublin
