= 2018 European Rugby Champions Cup final =

2018 European Rugby Champions Cup Final
- Event: 2017–18 European Rugby Champions Cup
Leinster	Racing 92
(Ireland)	(France)
15	12
- Date: 12 May 2018
- Venue: San Mamés, Bilbao
- Man of the Match: James Ryan (Leinster)
- Referee: Wayne Barnes (England)
- Attendance: 52,282

The 2018 European Rugby Champions Cup Final was the final match in the 2017–18 European Rugby Champions Cup, and the twenty-third European club rugby final in general.

Irish club Leinster defeated French club Racing 92 in the final played in Bilbao, Spain — the first time it was contested outside one of the Six Nations countries.

== Route to the final ==
Note: In all results below, the score of the finalist is given first (H: home; A: away).

(Ireland) Leinster		Round	(France) Racing 92	
Opponent	Result	Pool stage	Opponent	Result
(France) Montpellier	24–17 (H)	Matchday 1	(England) Leicester Tigers	22–18 (H)
(Scotland) Glasgow Warriors	34–18 (A)	Matchday 2	(Ireland) Munster	7–14 (A)
(England) Exeter Chiefs	18–8 (A)	Matchday 3	(France) Castres	13–16 (A)
(England) Exeter Chiefs	22–17 (H)	Matchday 4	(France) Castres	29–7 (H)
(Scotland) Glasgow Warriors	55–19 (H)	Matchday 5	(Ireland) Munster	34–30 (H)
(France) Montpellier	23–14 (A)	Matchday 6	(England) Leicester Tigers	23–20 (A)
Pool 3 winner: Team / P / Pts; (Ireland) Leinster / 6 / 27; (England) Exeter Chiefs / 6 / 15; (France) Montpellier / 6 / 13; (Scotland) Glasgow Warriors / 6 / 7		Final standings	Pool 4 runner-up: Team / P / Pts; (Ireland) Munster / 6 / 21; (France) Racing 92 / 6 / 19; (France) Castres / 6 / 12; (England) Leicester Tigers / 6 / 7	
Opponent	Result	Knock-out stage	Opponent	Result
(England) Saracens	30–19 (H)	Quarter-finals	(France) Clermont Auvergne	28–17 (A)
(Wales) Scarlets	38–16 (H)	Semi-finals	(Ireland) Munster	27–22 (H)

== Match ==
=== Summary ===
The game was played in wet conditions, which made passing and attacking play difficult for both teams. Early in the game Racing fly-half Pat Lambie was forced off the field with a knee injury, replaced by French international Rémi Talès. Racing recovered from this set back to score the first points of the game with Teddy Iribaren kicking a penalty. Leinster responded on 16 minutes when Johnny Sexton opened their account, also from a penalty. Iribaren reestablished Racing's lead five minutes later and Sexton responded just before half time, to send the teams into the break level on six points apiece.

The teams were both unchanged for the second half, and the penalty tit-for-tat continued. Sexton was the first to strike in the second half with a converted effort on 53 minutes, before Iribaren missed and the teams remained level at 9–9 coming into the final 10 minutes of play. Iribaren kicked his fourth penalty of the day to give Racing back their three-point lead, but Leinster responded quickly with a penalty from captain Isa Nacewa. Nacewa scored another penalty with two minutes left to play to give Leinster the lead for the first time in the match. Racing won the kick off and worked down the field, looking for a drop goal to level the match again and bring play to extra time. With clock over 80 minutes the opportunity fell to Talès, who pulled his effort wide to the left to give Leinster their fourth European title.

=== Details ===
12 May 2018
17:45

Leinster (Ireland)	15 – 12	(France) Racing 92
Pen: Sexton (3/3) 16', 38', 53'; Nacewa (2/2) 73', 78'	Report	Pen: Iribaren (4/5) 3', 21', 44', 70'

San Mamés, Bilbao
Attendance: 52,282
Referee: Wayne Barnes (RFU)

Leinster	Racing 92

FB	15	(Ireland) Rob Kearney
RW	14	(Ireland) Jordan Larmour
OC	13	(Ireland) Garry Ringrose
IC	12	(Ireland) Robbie Henshaw
LW	11	(Fiji) Isa Nacewa (c)
FH	10	(Ireland) Johnny Sexton
SH	9	(Ireland) Luke McGrath	(substituted off) 61'
N8	8	(Ireland) Jordi Murphy	(substituted off) 61'
OF	7	(Ireland) Dan Leavy
BF	6	(Australia) Scott Fardy
RL	5	(Ireland) James Ryan
LL	4	(Ireland) Devin Toner
TP	3	(Ireland) Tadhg Furlong	(substituted off) 66'
HK	2	(Ireland) Seán Cronin	(substituted off) 61'
LP	1	(Ireland) Cian Healy	(substituted off) 68'
Substitutions:
HK	16	(Ireland) James Tracy	(substituted in) 61'
PR	17	(Ireland) Jack McGrath	(substituted in) 68'
PR	18	(Ireland) Andrew Porter	(substituted in) 66'
FL	19	(Ireland) Rhys Ruddock
N8	20	(Ireland) Jack Conan	(substituted in) 61'
SH	21	(Ireland) Jamison Gibson-Park	(substituted in) 61'
FH	22	(Ireland) Joey Carbery
CE	23	(Ireland) Rory O'Loughlin
Coach:
(Ireland) Leo Cullen

FB	15	(France) Louis Dupichot	(substituted off) 30'	(substituted in) 38'
RW	14	(France) Teddy Thomas
OC	13	(France) Virimi Vakatawa
IC	12	(France) Henry Chavancy
LW	11	(France) Marc Andreu
FH	10	(South Africa) Pat Lambie	(substituted off) 3'
SH	9	(France) Teddy Iribaren
N8	8	(France) Yannick Nyanga (c)
OF	7	(France) Bernard Le Roux	(substituted off) 69'
BF	6	(France) Wenceslas Lauret
RL	5	(Fiji) Leone Nakarawa
LL	4	(Ireland) Donnacha Ryan
TP	3	(France) Cedate Gomes Sa	(substituted off) 54'
HK	2	(France) Camille Chat	(substituted off) 44'	(substituted in) 54'	(substituted off) 58'
LP	1	(France) Eddy Ben Arous	(substituted off) 54'
Substitutions:
HK	16	(Samoa) Ole Avei	(substituted in) 44'	(substituted off) 54'	(substituted in) 58'
PR	17	(Georgia (country)) Vasil Kakovin	(substituted in) 54'
PR	18	(Samoa) Census Johnston	(substituted in) 41'
FL	19	(France) Boris Palu
FL	20	(France) Baptiste Chouzenoux	(substituted in) 69'
SH	21	(France) Antoine Gibert
FH	22	(France) Rémi Talès	(substituted in) 3'
WG	23	(New Zealand) Joe Rokocoko	(substituted in) 30'	(substituted off) 38'
Coach:
(France) Laurent Labit (France) Laurent Travers

Man of the Match:
(Ireland) James Ryan

Touch judges:
JP Doyle (RFU)
Tom Foley (RFU)
Television Match Official:
Rowan Kitt (RFU)
