= Matthias Haddad =

French rugby union player

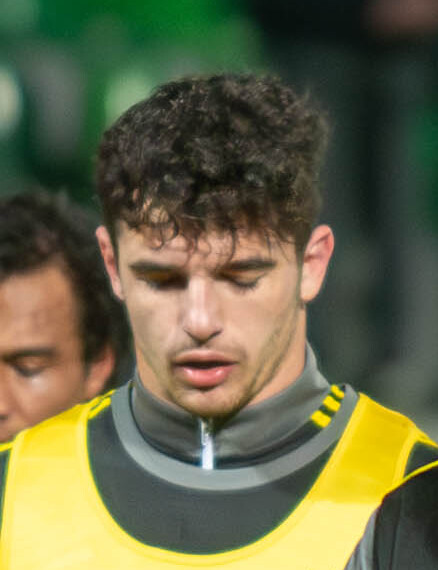
- Born: Matthias Haddad-Victor; 10 March 2001 (age 25) La Rochelle, France
- Height: 1.93 m (6 ft 4 in)
- Weight: 99 kg (15 st 8 lb)

Rugby union career
- Position: Flanker
- Current team: La Rochelle
Senior career
Years	Team	Apps	(Points)
2020–	La Rochelle	51	(10)
- Correct as of 18 January 2025
International career
Years	Team	Apps	(Points)
2019–2021	France U20	12	(5)
- Correct as of 13 July 2021

Matthias Haddad (born 10 March 2001) is a French rugby union player, currently playing in the back row for Top 14 side La Rochelle.

== Honours ==
=== Club ===
(France) La Rochelle

- European Rugby Champions Cup: 2021–2022
