= 2021 European Rugby Champions Cup final =

2021 European Rugby Champions Cup Final
- Event: 2020–21 European Rugby Champions Cup
La Rochelle	Toulouse
(France)	(France)
17	22
- Date: 22 May 2021
- Venue: Twickenham Stadium, London
- Referee: Luke Pearce (England)

The 2021 European Rugby Champions Cup Final was the final match in the 2020–21 European Rugby Champions Cup, and the twenty-sixth European club rugby final in general. The final was between French teams La Rochelle and Toulouse.

== Background ==
English referee Luke Pearce was officiating a Champions Cup final for the first time. Aged 33, he was the youngest referee to officiate at the final. A maximum of 10,000 fans were allowed to attend the final at Twickenham. La Rochelle were appearing in their first final, with Toulouse appearing in the final for the seventh time, winning on four occasions in 1996, 2003, 2005, and 2010.

Toulouse won the game 22–17 to claim their fifth title.

== Match ==
La Rochelle	Toulouse

=== Details ===
22 May 2021
16:45

La Rochelle (France)	17–22	(France) Toulouse
Try: Kerr-Barlow 72' m Pen: West (4/6) 7', 26', 32', 40'	Report	Try: Mallía 59' c Con: Ntamack (1/1) 60'; Pen: Ntamack (5/5) 4', 10', 37', 46', 69'

Twickenham Stadium
Referee: Luke Pearce (England)

FB	15	(France) Brice Dulin
RW	14	(South Africa) Dillyn Leyds			51' to 60'		(substituted off) 67'
OC	13	(France) Geoffrey Doumayrou
IC	12	(Fiji) Levani Botia	(red card) 27'
LW	11	(South Africa) Raymond Rhule
FH	10	(New Zealand) Ihaia West
SH	9	(New Zealand) Tawera Kerr-Barlow
N8	8	(New Zealand) Victor Vito	(substituted off) 54'
OF	7	(France) Kevin Gourdon	(substituted off) 60'
BF	6	(France) Grégory Alldritt
RL	5	(Australia) Will Skelton
LL	4	(France) Romain Sazy (c)
TP	3	(France) Uini Atonio	(substituted off) 64'
HK	2	(France) Pierre Bourgarit	(substituted off) 60'
LP	1	(France) Dany Priso	(substituted off) 41'
Substitutions:
HK	16	(Argentina) Facundo Bosch	(substituted in) 60'
PR	17	(France) Reda Wardi	(substituted in) 41'
PR	18	(France) Arthur Joly	(substituted in) 64'
LK	19	(France) Thomas Lavault		(substituted in) 61'
BR	20	(South Africa) Wiaan Liebenberg	(substituted in) 54'
CE	21	(France) Paul Boudehent	(substituted in) 60'	(substituted off) 61'
WG	22	(France) Arthur Retière			(substituted in) 51'	(substituted off) 60'	(substituted in) 67'
FH	23	(France) Jules Plisson
Coach:
(New Zealand) Jono Gibbes (Ireland) Ronan O'Gara

FB	15	(France) Maxime Médard			28' to 37'
RW	14	(South Africa) Cheslin Kolbe
OC	13	(Argentina) Juan Cruz Mallía
IC	12	(New Zealand) Pita Ahki
LW	11	(France) Matthis Lebel
FH	10	(France) Romain Ntamack
SH	9	(France) Antoine Dupont (c)
N8	8	(New Zealand) Jerome Kaino	(substituted off) 54'
OF	7	(France) François Cros
BF	6	(South Africa) Rynhardt Elstadt
RL	5	(Australia) Richie Arnold	(substituted off) 9'
LL	4	(Australia) Rory Arnold	(substituted off) 69'
TP	3	(New Zealand) Charlie Faumuina	(substituted off) 64'
HK	2	(France) Peato Mauvaka	(substituted off) 69'
LP	1	(France) Cyril Baille	(substituted off) 69'	(substituted in) 79'
Substitutions:
HK	16	(France) Guillaume Marchand	(substituted in) 69'
PR	17	(France) Clément Castets	(substituted in) 69'	(substituted off) 79'
PR	18	(United States) David Ainu'u	(substituted in) 64'
LK	19	(Samoa) Joe Tekori	(substituted in) 9'
LK	20	(France) Thibaud Flament	(substituted in) 69'
BR	21	(France) Selevasio Tolofua	(substituted in) 54'
SH	22	(France) Baptiste Germain
FB	23	(France) Thomas Ramos			(substituted in) 28'	(substituted off) 37'
Coach:
(France) Ugo Mola
