= Romain Sazy =

French rugby union player

- Born: Romain Sazy; 14 October 1986 (age 40) Asques, France
- Height: 1.99 m (6 ft 6 1/2 in)
- Weight: 108 kg (17 st 0 lb)

Rugby union career
- Position: Lock
Amateur team(s)
Years	Team	Apps	(Points)
- CA Castelsarrasin
Senior career
Years	Team	Apps	(Points)
2007–2010	Montauban	28	(5)
2010–	La Rochelle	339	(55)
- Correct as of 26 May 2023

Romain Sazy (born 14 October 1986) is a French professional rugby union player. He currently plays at lock for La Rochelle in the Top 14.

== Honours ==
=== La Rochelle ===
- European Rugby Champions Cup: 2021–22, 2022–23; runner-up: 2020–21
- European Rugby Challenge Cup runner-up: 2018-19
- Top 14 runner-up: 2020-21
