= Jules Favre (rugby union) =

French rugby union player

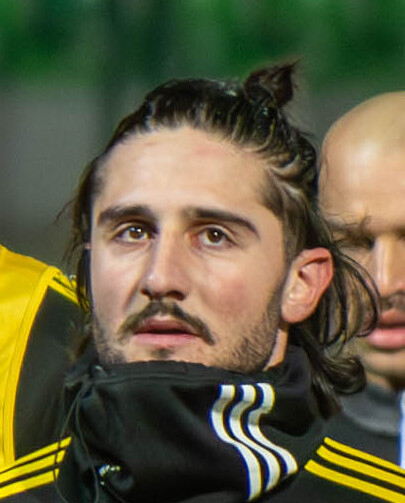
- Born: 22 March 1999 (age 27) La Seyne-sur-Mer, France
- Height: 1.81 m (5 ft 11 1/2 in)
- Weight: 90 kg (200 lb)

Rugby union career
- Position(s): Centre, wing
Senior career
Years	Team	Apps	(Points)
2018–	La Rochelle	82	(107)
- Correct as of 18 January 2022
International career
Years	Team	Apps	(Points)
2019	France U20	1	(5)
- Correct as of 10 July 2024

Jules Favre (born 22 March 1999) is a French rugby union player, who plays for Stade Rochelais.

He was first selected for the French national rugby team in January 2022, for the following Six Nations tournament.

== Honours ==
=== Club ===
(France) La Rochelle

- European Rugby Champions Cup: 2021–2022
