= Wayne Barnes =

Rugby referee

Wayne Barnes OBE
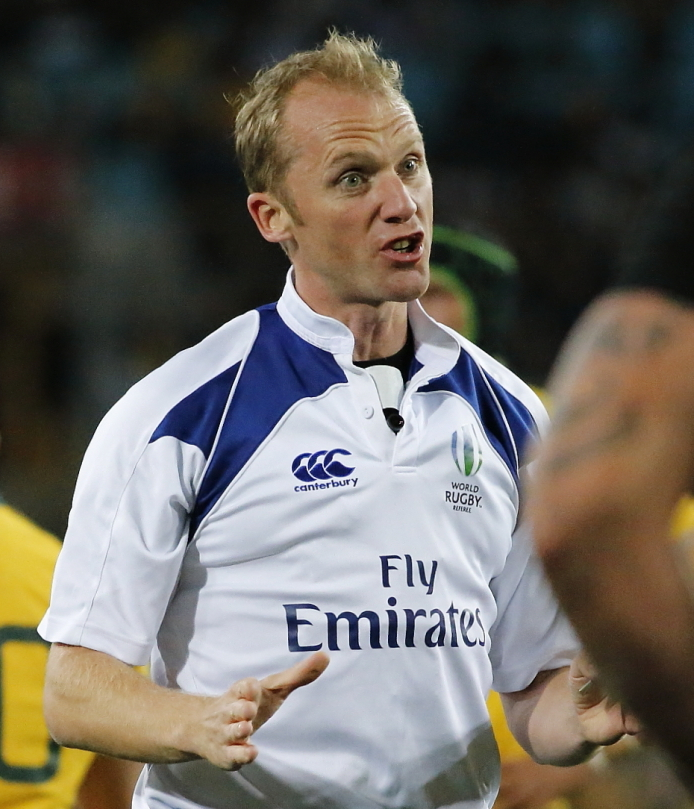
- Barnes refereeing in 2017
- Born: Wayne Barnes; 20 April 1979 (age 47) Bream, Gloucestershire, England
- Height: 6 ft (183 cm)
- School: Whitecross School, Lydney; Monmouth School Sixth Form
- University: University of East Anglia
- Occupation(s): Rugby Union referee, Barrister

Rugby union career
Refereeing career
Years	Competition	Apps
-	English Premiership	-
–	Heineken Cup	
–	European Challenge Cup	
–	Six Nations	
–	Rugby Championship	

Wayne Barnes OBE (born 20 April 1979) is an English retired international rugby union referee. He was a frequent referee in the English Premiership, and refereed games in the Heineken Cup and the European Challenge Cup. At international level, Barnes refereed matches at the Rugby World Cup, the Six Nations, the Rugby Championship and the Pacific Nations Cup competitions.

== Early life ==
Born in Bream, in the Forest of Dean, Gloucestershire, he was educated at Whitecross School; and the University of East Anglia, graduating with a law degree in 2000. He is a criminal barrister and partner at Squire Patton Boggs.

== Refereeing career ==
Barnes took up refereeing aged 15 with Gloucester & District Referees. At university he transferred to the Norfolk Referees Society, part of Eastern Counties (ECRURF) followed by a transfer to London Society of RFU Referees. In 2001, at the age of 21, Barnes became the youngest referee ever appointed to the Panel of National Referees. He became a professional referee in April 2005.

Barnes refereed at the 2003 U19 World Cup in Saint-Denis, the 2005 Under 21 Rugby World Championship in Argentina, and was the English representative on the Sevens circuit from December 2003 to March 2005. In 2006, Barnes made his test debut as a referee, taking charge of three matches in the inaugural Pacific Five Nations.

Barnes was one of three English referees to officiate at the 2007 Rugby World Cup, the others being Chris White and Tony Spreadbury. After New Zealand were knocked out of the quarter-final, Bebo profiles were created by some New Zealand fans dedicated to criticism and abuse of Barnes. Comments on Bebo and other internet sites, including death threats and personal abuse, were condemned by the International Rugby Board and New Zealand Prime Minister Helen Clark.

In the 2008 Six Nations Championship, Barnes became the first English official to take charge of a match at Croke Park, in which Wales beat Ireland 16–12. In the 2009 Six Nations Championship, Barnes refereed the final-day decider between Wales and Ireland at the Millennium Stadium, Cardiff where Ireland were chasing their first Grand Slam for 61 years and Wales chasing the Championship.

He was appointed in 2008 to take charge of his first Heineken Cup knockout match, between Stade Toulousain and Cardiff Blues at Le Stadium on 6 April 2008. In 2010, Barnes officiated his first Heineken Cup Final between Toulouse and Biarritz at the Stade de France, Saint-Denis, on 22 May.

After officiating at his second Rugby World Cup in New Zealand in 2011 and refereeing the third/fourth place game between Wales and Australia, Barnes refereed a Heineken Cup semi-final on Sunday 29 April 2012; Clermont Auvergne v Leinster.

Barnes was one of the officials at the Pacific Nations' Cup in Japan in 2013.

On 25 May 2013, Barnes refereed the English Premiership final between Leicester Tigers and Northampton Saints, his fifth English Premiership final, during which he sent off Northampton captain Dylan Hartley for calling Barnes "a fucking cheat”. This was the first time a player had been sent off in a Premiership final.

Barnes was one of 12 referees selected to officiate the 2015 Rugby World Cup.

On 22 December 2017, Barnes broke the all time Premiership appearances record (191) for a referee while officiating Worcester Warriors 23–8 victory over London Irish.

He was selected as a match official for the 2019 Rugby World Cup in Japan.

In January 2022, Barnes refereed his 250th Premiership Rugby match. On 5 November 2022, Barnes refereed the match between Wales and New Zealand in the 2022 Autumn Nations Series. It was his 100th international match as a referee, equalling the record set by Wales' Nigel Owens.

In October 2023, Barnes was chosen to referee the 2023 Rugby World Cup final between New Zealand and South Africa at the Stade de France, in his 111th test match and 27th World Cup match. Joining Barnes were compatriots Karl Dickson and Matthew Carley as assistant referees, and Tom Foley as the television match official.

On 2 November 2023, Barnes announced his retirement from refereeing after officiating in 111 test matches, including five Rugby World Cups and 26 Six Nations matches.

Barnes' autobiography, Throwing the Book, written with Ben Dirs, with an audiobook version narrated by Rich Keeble, was released by Hachette on 9 November 2023.
