= Stade Rochelais =

French rugby union club, based in La Rochelle

(France) Stade Rochelais
- Full name: Stade Rochelais
- Nickname(s): Les Maritimes (The Seaborn Men); Les Jaune et Noir (The Yellow and Blacks); Les Bagnards (The Convicts)
- Founded: 1898; 128 years ago
- Location: La Rochelle, France
- Ground: Stade Marcel-Deflandre (Capacity: 16,700)
- Chairman: Vincent Merling
- Coach: Ronan O'Gara
- Captain(s): Grégory Alldritt; Uini Atonio
- League: Top 14
- 2024–25: 7th
1st kit	2nd kit	3rd kit

Official website
- www.staderochelais.com

Stade Rochelais (French pronunciation: [stad ʁɔʃlɛ]), commonly called La Rochelle, is a French professional rugby union club based in La Rochelle, France that competes in the Top 14. Founded in 1898 and wearing yellow and black, the club's first-team plays its home matches at Stade Marcel-Deflandre.

Alongside other French club Brive, La Rochelle is one of only two clubs that won the European Rugby Champions Cup (twice in its case; beating Leinster in both 2022 and 2023 finals) without succeeding in winning its domestic championship losing on both occasions against Toulouse in the final: the first time in 2021 and the second in 2023. Owned by several shareholders, including club president and coffee magnate Vincent Merling, the club is renowned for the fervour of its supporters and its continual sold-out home matches.

== History ==
Originally formed in 1898, Stade Rochelais won three regional Atlantic championships in the early part of the 20th century, qualifying them for the French Championship, where they reached the quarter-finals twice and the semi-finals once. The popularity of rugby league in the area lessened the number of available players, and in 1935 Stade Rochelais merged with neighbours Union Sportive Rochelaise.

Occupation of La Rochelle by troops from Nazi Germany, accompanied by a banning of rugby league by the Vichy Government, forced the city's rugby league club La Rochelle-Etudiants XIII to also be merged into Stade Rochelais in 1941. This was overseen by club president Marcel Deflandre, who was later executed for his role as part of the French Resistance - the club's stadium is named Stade Marcel-Deflandre in his honour.

The club formed a school for training players and coaches in the 1950s, resulting in them reaching the French Championship quarter-finals three times in the 1960s. They were relegated in 1985, returning in 1997. They were again relegated in 2002, though they won the Challenge Yves du Manoir that same year. They retained the Challenge title the following year but were not promoted again until 2010. They spent one season in Top 16 before being relegated again.

Les Maritimes came third in the 2013–14 Rugby Pro D2 season and were promoting after beating Agen in the play-off final.

In May 2022, they won both their first ever trophy and first ever Champions Cup defeating Leinster 24–21 at the Stade Vélodrome.

In May 2023, they retained the Champions Cup again defeating Leinster this time 27–26 at the Aviva Stadium.

== Honours ==
- European Rugby Champions Cup
  - Champions (2): 2022, 2023
  - Runners-up (1): 2021
- French championship Top 14
  - Runners-up (2): 2021, 2023
- European Rugby Challenge Cup
  - Runners-up (1): 2019
- League Cup
  - Champions (2): 2002, 2003

== Finals results ==
=== French Championship ===
Date	Winners	Score	Runners-up	Venue	Spectators
25 June 2021	Stade Toulousain	18–8	Stade Rochelais	Stade de France, Saint-Denis	14,000
17 June 2023	Stade Toulousain	29–26	Stade Rochelais	Stade de France, Saint-Denis	79,804

=== European Rugby Champions Cup ===
Date	Winners	Score	Runners-up	Venue	Spectators
22 May 2021	(France) Stade Toulousain	22–17	(France) Stade Rochelais	Twickenham Stadium, London	10,000
28 May 2022	(France) Stade Rochelais	24–21	(Ireland) Leinster	Orange Vélodrome, Marseille	59,682
20 May 2023	(France) Stade Rochelais	27–26	(Ireland) Leinster	Aviva Stadium, Dublin	51,711

=== European Rugby Challenge Cup ===
Date	Winners	Score	Runners-up	Venue	Spectators
10 May 2019	(France) ASM Clermont	36–16	(France) Stade Rochelais	St James' Park, Newcastle	28,438

== Current standings ==
2025–26 Top 14 Table
Pos	Team	Pld	W	D	L	PF	PA	PD	TF	TA	TB	LB	Pts	Qualification
1	Toulouse	26	18	0	8	981	617	+364	134	73	13	3	86 (Note: Toulouse received a two-point deduction due to irregularities around the transfer of their former player Melvyn Jaminet)	Qualification for playoff semi-finals and European Rugby Champions Cup
2	Montpellier	26	17	1	8	824	587	+237	101	69	8	4	82	Qualification for playoff semi-finals and European Rugby Champions Cup
3	Stade Français	26	15	1	10	869	664	+205	113	83	11	6	79	Qualification for playoff semi-final qualifiers and European Rugby Champions Cup
4	Pau	26	17	0	9	817	665	+152	98	82	7	3	78	Qualification for playoff semi-final qualifiers and European Rugby Champions Cup
5	Racing 92	26	16	1	9	828	723	+105	101	91	6	2	74	Qualification for playoff semi-final qualifiers and European Rugby Champions Cup
6	La Rochelle	26	15	0	11	824	634	+190	106	73	8	4	72	Qualification for playoff semi-final qualifiers and European Rugby Champions Cup
7	Clermont	26	15	0	11	812	708	+104	103	87	8	3	71	Qualification for European Rugby Champions Cup
8	Bordeaux Bègles	26	14	0	12	822	719	+103	113	90	8	6	70	Qualification for European Rugby Champions Cup
9	Toulon	26	12	1	13	714	820	−106	96	103	8	1	59	Qualification for European Rugby Challenge Cup
10	Castres	26	11	0	15	660	751	−91	81	96	3	8	55	Qualification for European Rugby Challenge Cup
11	Lyon	26	11	1	14	734	774	−40	92	101	3	3	52	Qualification for European Rugby Challenge Cup
12	Bayonne	26	11	0	15	747	869	−122	94	113	4	3	51	Qualification for European Rugby Challenge Cup
13	Perpignan	26	6	0	20	550	797	−247	64	99	1	4	29	Qualification for relegation play-off
14	Montauban	26	1	1	24	495	1349	−854	61	197	0	1	7	Relegation to Pro D2

Updated to match(es) played on 17 May 2026. Source: Top 14

== Current squad ==
The La Rochelle squad for the 2026–27 season is:

La Rochelle 2026–27 Top 14 squad
**Props**: (New Zealand) Sione Ahio; (France) Nathan Fraissenon; (France) Alexandre Kaddouri; (Georgia (country)) **Alexsandre Kuntelia**; (France) Louis Penverne; (France) Karl Sorin; **Hookers**: (France) **Pierre Bourgarit**; (Australia) **Tolu Latu**; (France) Quentin Lesplaucq; **Locks**: (France) Thomas Adelaide; (France) Charles Kanta-Samba; (France) **Thomas Lavault**; (South Africa) **Salmaan Moerat**; (Australia) **Will Skelton**; (Fiji) Watisoni Waqanisaravi	**Back row**: (France) **Grégory Alldritt**; (Fiji) **Levani Botia**; (France) **Paul Boudehent**; (France) Matthias Haddad; (France) **Oscar Jégou**; (Samoa) **Theo McFarland**; (France) Andy Timo; (New Zealand) Sam Tuifua; **Scrum-halves**: (France) Thomas Berjon; (France) **Nolann Le Garrec**; (France) Christophe Loustalot; **Fly-halves**: (France) **Antoine Hastoy**; (Scotland) **Ben Healy**	**Centres**: (France) **Jonathan Danty**; (France) Simeli Daunivucu; (France) Jules Favre; (South Africa) David Kriel; (Fiji) Semi Lagivala; (Tonga) **George Moala**; **Wings**: (France) Nathan Bollengier; (France) Hoani Bosmorin; (South Africa) **Dillyn Leyds**; (England) **Jack Nowell**; (New Zealand) Tevita Ofa; **Fullbacks**: (Georgia (country)) **Davit Niniashvili**; (France) Ugo Pacome
**(c)** denotes the team captain. **Bold** denotes internationally capped players. Source:

=== Espoirs squad ===
La Rochelle 2026–27 Espoirs squad
**Props**: (Tonga) Upaleto Feno; (France) Maxence Ligeron-Borg; (France) Christian Luaki; (Netherlands) Toine Obiang Nguema; (Argentina) Valentino Pani; (France) Zak Price; **Hookers**: (France) Gavin Garault; (Fiji) Seveci Naikalagi Naisilisili; **Locks**: (France) Igor Gatteau; (Italy) Christian Germano; (Australia) Sio Kite	**Back row**: (France) Lucas Andjisseramatchi; (France) Oscar Boutez; (Belgium) Bas Broeks; (Russia) Kirill Fraindt; (Belgium) Charlie Shortall; (England) Max Worsley; **Scrum-halves**: (France) Temanatua Boichot; (France) Valentin Bouju; (France) Nolhann Couilloud; **Fly-halves**: (France) Diego Jurd; (France) Sacha Elissalde; (France) Arthur Vende	**Centres**: (Tonga) Uwe Kamoto; (France) Paco Schiebel; (Belgium) Oscar Shortall; **Wings**: (France) Hugo Bizotto; (Tonga) Jurgen Kamoto; (France) Ilian Sonko-Basin; (Fiji) Peni Torau Vuetimaiwai; **Fullbacks**: (France) Martin Betsen; (South Africa) Mark Grindlay; (France) Jessy Taofifenua

== Notable former players ==
- (Argentina) Facundo Bosch
- (Argentina) Ramiro Herrera
- (Argentina) Germán Llanes
- (Argentina) Federico Todeschini
- (Australia) Zack Holmes
- (Australia) Brock James
- (Australia) Ryan Lamb
- (Australia) Lopeti Timani
- (Belgium) Julien Berger
- (Canada) Jason Marshall
- (England) Lesley Vainikolo
- (Fiji) Sireli Bobo
- (Fiji) Eneriko Buliruarua
- (Fiji) Norman Ligairi
- (Fiji) Kini Murimurivalu
- (Fiji) Jone Qovu
- (Fiji) Seru Rabeni
- (Fiji) Alipate Ratini
- (Fiji) Savenaca Rawaca
- (Fiji) Albert Vulivuli
- (France) Marc Andreu
- (France) Julien Audy
- (France) Alexi Balès
- (France) Jean-Pascal Barraque
- (France) Steeve Barry
- (France) Pierre Bérard
- (France) Mohamed Boughanmi
- (France) Benoît Bourrust
- (France) Damien Cler
- (France) Thomas Combezou
- (France) Manoël Dall'igna
- (France) Benjamin Dambielle
- (France) Vincent Debaty
- (France) Yacine Dekkiche
- (France) William Demotte
- (France) Geoffrey Doumayrou
- (France) Luc Ducalcon
- (France) Arnaud Élissalde
- (France) Jean-Baptiste Élissalde
- (France) Jean-Pierre Élissalde
- (France) Sébastien Fauqué
- (France) Lionel Faure
- (France) Romain Frou
- (France) Loann Goujon
- (France) Jean-Philippe Grandclaude
- (France) Gabriel Lacroix
- (France) Damien Lagrange
- (France) Grégory Lamboley
- (France) Benjamin Lapeyre
- (France) Benoit Lecouls
- (France) Henri Magois
- (France) Gérald Merceron
- (France) Jean Pambrun
- (France) Vincent Pelo
- (France) Julien Pierre
- (France) Jules Plisson
- (France) Dany Priso
- (France) Vincent Rattez
- (France) Arthur Retière
- (France) David Roumieu
- (France) Christophe Samson
- (France) Laurent Simutoga
- (France) Jérémy Sinzelle
- (France) Rémi Talès
- (French Polynesia) Jean-Teiva Jacquelain
- (Georgia (country)) Gagi Bazadze
- (Georgia (country)) Guram Papidze
- (Germany) Robert Mohr
- (Italy) Gonzalo Canale
- (Italy) Pietro Ceccarelli
- (Italy) Leandro Cedaro
- (New Zealand) Jason Eaton
- (New Zealand) Hamish Gard
- (New Zealand) Romana Graham
- (New Zealand) David Raikuna
- (New Zealand) Rene Ranger
- (New Zealand) Victor Vito
- (New Zealand) Ihaia West
- (Romania) Petrișor Toderașc
- (Samoa) Alofa Alofa
- (Samoa) Piula Faʻasalele
- (Samoa) Tamato Leupolu
- (South Africa) Ricky Januarie
- (South Africa) Paul Jordaan

Arnaud, then his son Jean-Pierre and his grandson Jean-Baptiste all played for La Rochelle as scrum-halves.

== Coaches ==
Well known former coaches include

- Arnaud Élissalde
- Jean-Pierre Élissalde
- Patrice Collazo
- Xavier Garbajosa
- Ronan O'Gara

The club only had five head coaches from 1992 onwards, including Ronan O'Gara since 2019.

== Leadership and management ==
Vincent Merling, president as of 2017, had guided the club for 25 years. He was the driving force behind the "Grow Together" campaign launched in 2015 that persuaded 500 local businesses to support/sponsor the club.

== See also ==
- List of rugby union clubs in France
- Rugby union in France
