= Ross Byrne =

Irish rugby union player

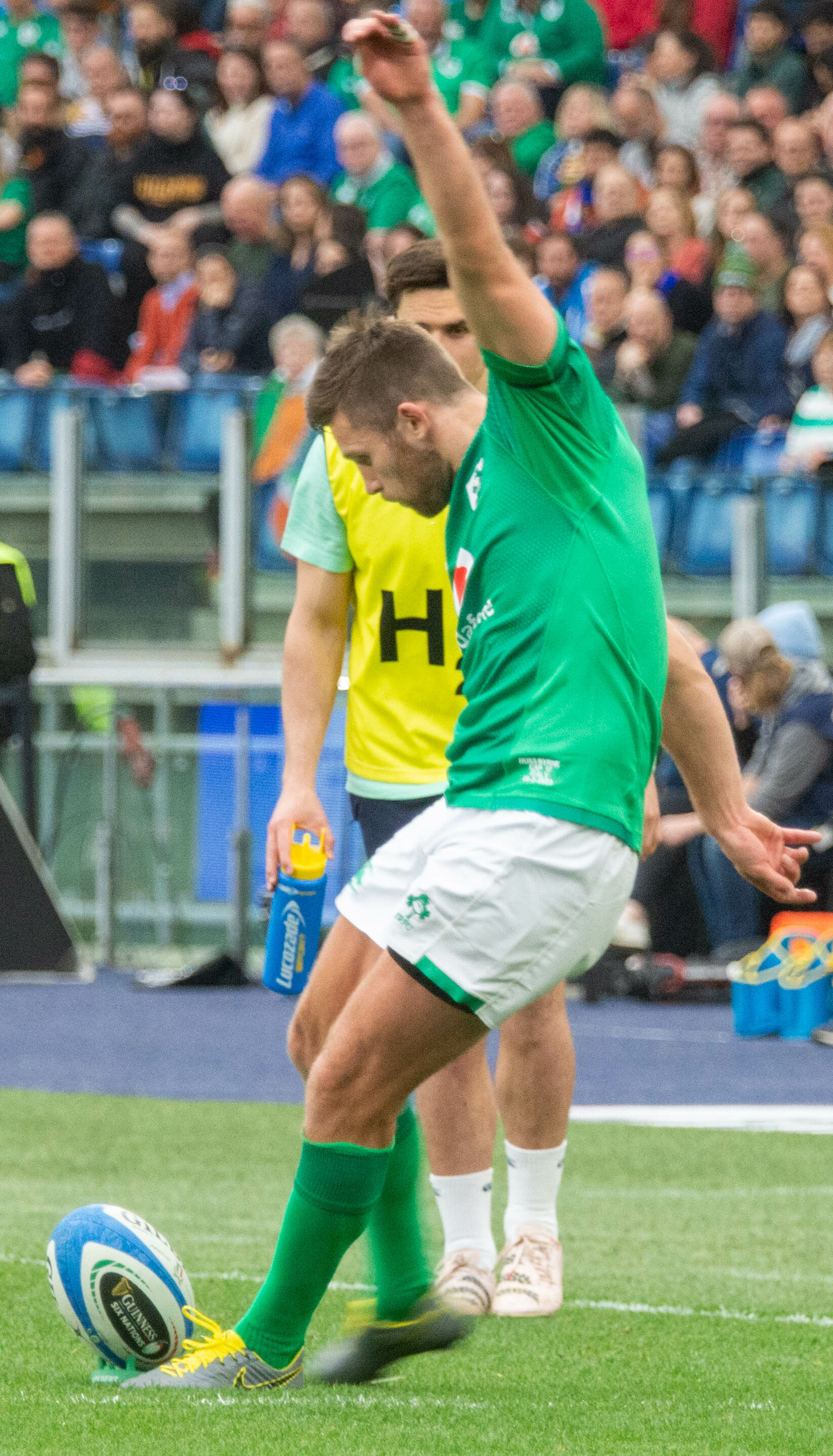
- Byrne representing Ireland during the Six Nations Championship
- Full name: Ross Patrick Byrne
- Born: 8 April 1995 (age 31) Dublin, Ireland
- Height: 1.91 m (6 ft 3 in)
- Weight: 92 kg (203 lb; 14 st 7 lb)
- School: St. Michael's College
- Notable relative: Harry Byrne (brother)

Rugby union career
- Position: Fly-half
- Current team: Gloucester
Senior career
Years	Team	Apps	(Points)
2015–2025	Leinster	194	(1,207)
2025–	Gloucester	18	(89)
- Correct as of 14 Nov 2026
International career
Years	Team	Apps	(Points)
2014–2015	Ireland under-20	15	(129)
2018–	Ireland	22	(56)
- Correct as of 19 March 2024

Ross Patrick Byrne (born 8 April 1995) is an Irish professional rugby union player who plays as a fly-half for Prem Rugby club Gloucester and Ireland.

== Early life ==
Byrne went to school at St. Michael's College, Dublin. He was in the Leinster Rugby Academy, and played for Ireland's rugby youth teams.

== Professional career ==
On 24 October 2018, Byrne was named in the Ireland squad for the November Internationals. In November 2022 Byrne kicked a late penalty to contribute 3 points to Ireland's 13 point total in the 13–10 victory over Australia. In the opening match of the 2023 Six Nations, Ross Byrne replaced Jonathan Sexton as outhalf and scored a late conversion in Ireland's 34–10 win against Wales. Byrne was named in the 2022–23 URC Elite XV of the year, his second domestic team of the year achievement.

In February 2025, it was announced that Byrne would leave Leinster as he had signed for Gloucester Rugby for the 2025–26 Premiership Rugby season.

== Honours ==
Leinster

- 1× European Rugby Champions Cup: 2018
- 5× United Rugby Championship: 2018, 2019, 2020, 2021, 2025

Ireland

- 1× Six Nations Championship: 2023
- 1× Grand Slam: 2023
- 2× Triple Crown: 2022, 2023

Individual

- 2× United Rugby Championship Dream Team: 2022, 2023
