= Garry Ringrose =

Irish rugby union player

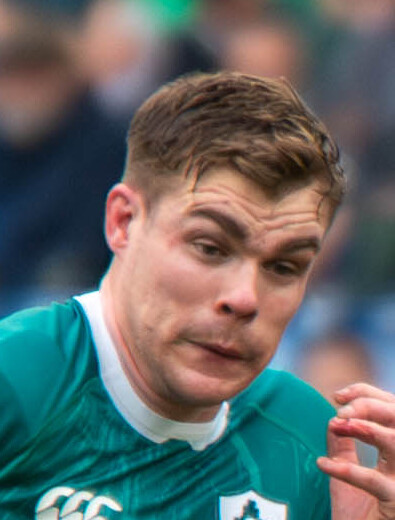
- Ringrose in 2025
- Born: 26 January 1995 (age 31) Dublin, Ireland
- Height: 1.88 m (6 ft 2 in)
- Weight: 95 kg (209 lb; 14 st 13 lb)
- School: Blackrock College
- University: University College Dublin

Rugby union career
- Position: Centre
- Current team: Leinster
Senior career
Years	Team	Apps	(Points)
2015–	Leinster	154	(253)
- Correct as of 17 October 2026
International career
Years	Team	Apps	(Points)
2014–2015	Ireland U20	17	(38)
2016–	Ireland	76	(77)
2025	British & Irish Lions	0	(0)
- Correct as of 18 July 2026

Garry Ringrose (born 26 January 1995) is an Irish professional rugby union player who plays as a centre for United Rugby Championship club Leinster and the Ireland national team.

== Club career ==
=== Leinster ===
Following Ringrose's performances for the Ireland under-20s, Leinster coach Leo Cullen handed Ringrose his Pro12 debut against Cardiff Blues on 12 September 2015. He scored his first Pro14 try in his second match, a 37–13 win against Newport Gwent Dragons on 3 October. Ringrose captained Leinster in the 2020 Pro 14 Final in which Leinster defeated rivals Ulster by a scoreline of 27–5 to cap off an undefeated domestic season.

In November 2023, Ringrose was named Leinster club co-captain alongside James Ryan following the retirement of Johnny Sexton.

== International career ==
=== Ireland ===
Ringrose debuted for the Ireland under-20s against Scotland at the 2014 Six Nations Under 20s Championship, but he was dropped, and played no further part in the tournament, after his side's second game against Wales. He returned to the side for the 2014 IRB Junior World Championship and scored three tries as Ireland reached the semi-finals. His performances at the tournament led to his inclusion on the four-man shortlist for World Rugby Junior Player of the Year.

Ringrose was selected on the bench for Ireland's historic win against the All Blacks in Chicago in November 2016, but did not take the field. He did though win his first Ireland cap a week later, starting the 52–21 win against Canada at the Aviva Stadium. In the final game of Ireland's 2016 Autumn Internationals series, he scored his first international try in a 27–24 victory over Australia. He was named in the Ireland Squad for the 2017 Six Nations Championship and scored a try, set up by Paddy Jackson, in the second round against Italy. He scored his third and fourth tries against Japan respectively in the first and second tests played over the summer of 2017.

== Career statistics ==
=== List of international tries ===
Number	Position	Points	Tries	Result	Opposition	Venue	Date	Ref.
1	Centre	5	1	Won	Australia	Aviva Stadium	26 November 2016	
2	Centre	5	1	Won	Italy	Stadio Olimpico	11 February 2017	
3	Centre	5	1	Won	Japan	Shizuoka Stadium	17 June 2017	
4	Centre	5	1	Won	Japan	Ajinomoto Stadium	24 June 2017	
5	Centre	5	1	Won	England	Twickenham Stadium	17 March 2018	
6	Centre	5	1	Won	Italy	Soldier Field	3 November 2018	
7	Centre	5	1	Lost	Japan	Shizuoka Stadium Ecopa	28 September 2019	
8	Centre	5	1	Won	Russia	Kobe Misaki Stadium	3 October 2019	
9	Centre	5	1	Won	Italy	Stadio Olimpico	27 February 2021	
10	Centre	5	1	Won	Japan	Aviva Stadium	6 November 2021	
11	Centre	5	1	Won	Wales	Aviva Stadium	5 February 2022	
12	Centre	5	1	Lost	New Zealand	Eden Park	2 July 2022	
13	Centre	5	1	Won	France	Aviva Stadium	11 February 2023	
14	Centre	5	1	Won	England	Aviva Stadium	19 August 2023	
15	Centre	5	1	Won	Scotland	Stade de France	7 October 2023	

as of 20 November 2023

== Honours ==
Leinster

- 1× European Rugby Champions Cup: 2018
- 4× Pro14: 2018, 2019, 2020, 2021

Ireland

- 3× Six Nations Championship: 2018, 2023, 2024
- 2× Grand Slam: 2018, 2023
- 3× Triple Crown: 2018, 2022, 2023

Individual

- 1× World Rugby Junior Player of the Year nominee: 2014
