= Dillyn Leyds =

South African rugby union player

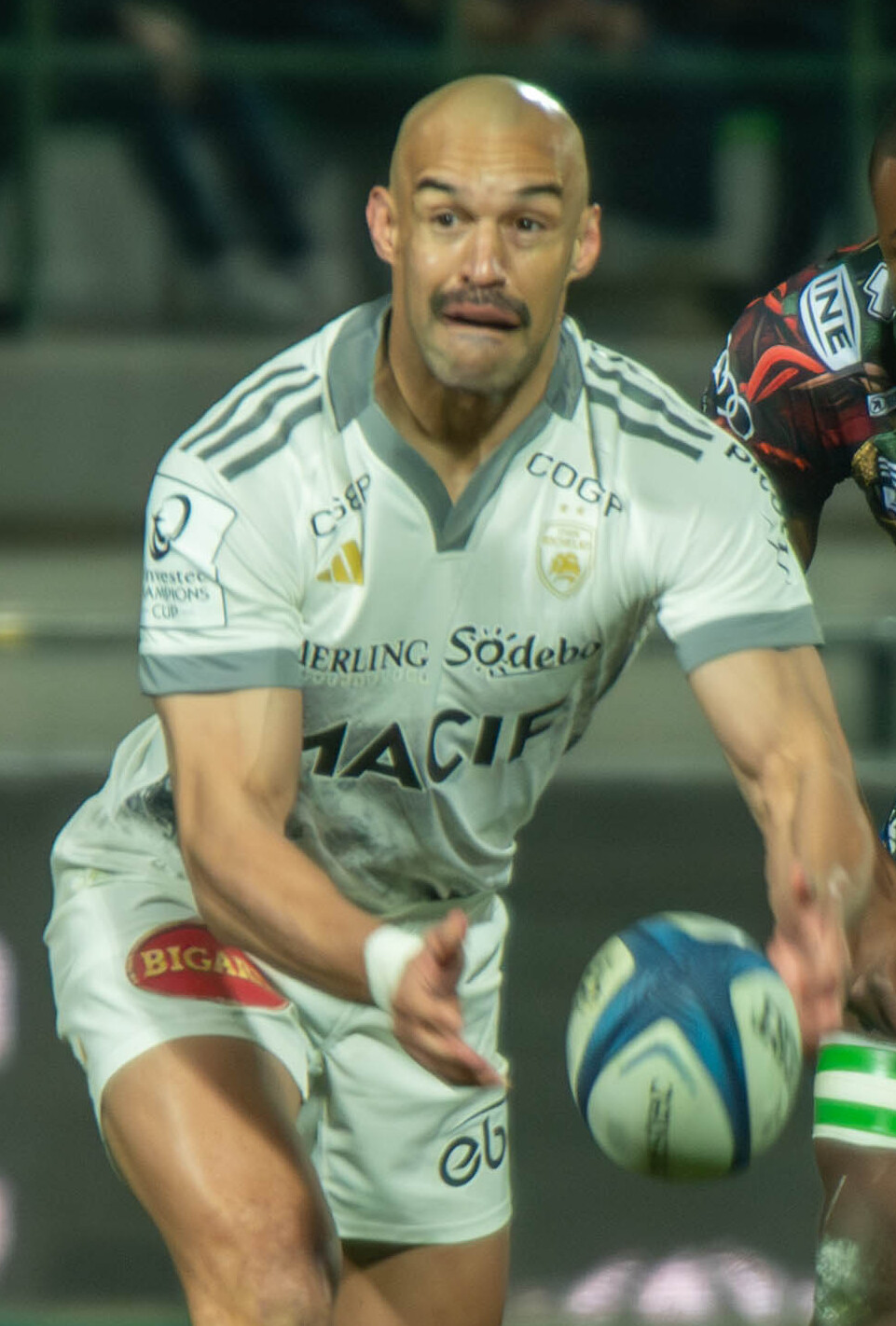
- Full name: Dillyn Yullrich Leyds
- Born: 12 September 1992 (age 34) Strand, South Africa
- Height: 1.85 m (6 ft 1 in)
- Weight: 85 kg (187 lb; 13 st 5 lb)
- School: Bishops College, Cape Town
- University: University of Cape Town
- Notable relative: Tristan Leyds (brother)

Rugby union career
- Position: Fullback / Fly-half / Wing
- Current team: La Rochelle
Youth career
- 2010–2013: Western Province
Amateur team(s)
Years	Team	Apps	(Points)
2012–2013	UCT Ikey Tigers	13	(48)
Senior career
Years	Team	Apps	(Points)
2013	Western Province	2	(5)
2014	Western Force	2	(0)
2014	Perth Spirit	6	(31)
2014–2020	Western Province	30	(65)
2015–2020	Stormers	65	(105)
2020–	La Rochelle	115	(220)
- Correct as of 3 February 2025
International career
Years	Team	Apps	(Points)
2012	South Africa U20	4	(0)
2017–	South Africa	10	(5)
- Correct as of 21 August 2019

Dillyn Yullrich Leyds (born 12 September 1992 in Somerset West, South Africa) is a South African rugby union player for the South Africa national team and La Rochelle in the French Top 14. He can play as a fullback, fly-half or wing.

== Career ==
=== Youth and Varsity rugby ===
Leyds was educated at Western Province Preparatory School and went on to Bishops College in Cape Town, where he played for their First XV rugby side in 2009 and 2010, alongside players such as Nizaam Carr, Oli Kebble, Johnny Kôtze, Sam Lane and Tim Swiel.

He represented Western Province at various age-group levels. In 2010, he was included in both their Under-18 Academy Week and Craven Week sides. The following year, the played for the Western Province U19 side in the 2011 Under-19 Provincial Championship, where he scored 133 points in 13 starts to finish second in the points-scoring charts and help his side reach the quarter-finals of the competition. He was a regular in the Western Province U21 squad during the 2012 and 2013 Provincial Championships, helping them reach a final in the former and winning the competition in 2013.

In 2012 and 2013, he also played Varsity Cup rugby for the UCT Ikey Tigers. He was jointly the third-highest try scorer in 2012, averaging one try per match in his seven appearances.

=== 2012 IRB Junior World Championship ===
In 2012, Leyds was a member of the South African Under-20 side that won the 2012 IRB Junior World Championship on home soil. Leyds started their Pool Stage matches against Ireland and England, their semi-final match against Argentina and the final against New Zealand, helping his side to a 22–16 victory over the defending champions to win the title for the first time ever.

=== Western Province ===
Leyds was included in the Western Province squad for the 2013 Vodacom Cup competition. His first class debut came against the Argentinean invitational side the Pampas XV in Cape Town. He came on as a second-half substitute and scored a conversion with his first touch of the ball, plus added a penalty later to help Western Province to a 28–17 victory. He also appeared in their semi-final match against the Golden Lions, but could not prevent them being knocked out of the competition following a 44–25 loss.

=== Western Force and Perth Spirit ===
Leyds moved to Australia to join Perth-based Super Rugby franchise the Force for the 2014 Super Rugby season, where he was named in their Wider Training Group. He was included in a matchday squad for the first time for their Round 16 match against the Crusaders in Christchurch. He made three substitute appearances for the Force during the season, appearing in their matches against the Crusaders, Blues and Reds.

He was also named in the Perth Spirit side that played in the 2014 National Rugby Championship. He made five appearances in the competition and scored a try in their match against the University of Canberra Vikings.

=== Return to Western Province ===
In March 2014, Western Province announced that Leyds would return to the Cape Town-based side for the 2014 Currie Cup Premier Division season. Due to ongoing commitments with the Force and Perth Spirit, he only started training with Western Province towards the end of September 2014.

=== Stormers ===
He made his Super Rugby debut for the Stormers on the wing against the Bulls scoring a try and helping the Stormers to shock the Bulls 17–29 in Pretoria on the opening weekend of 2015 Super Rugby season on 14 February 2015.

=== Stade Rochelais ===
Leyds signed for French Top 14 outfit, La Rochelle, ahead of the 2020–21 season.

== Honours ==
South Africa 2012 IRB Junior World Championship winner

=== Club ===
(South Africa) Western Province

- 2017 Currie Cup winner

(France) La Rochelle

- European Rugby Champions Cup: 2021–2022, 2022–2023
