= Jack Conan =

Irish rugby union player (born 1992)

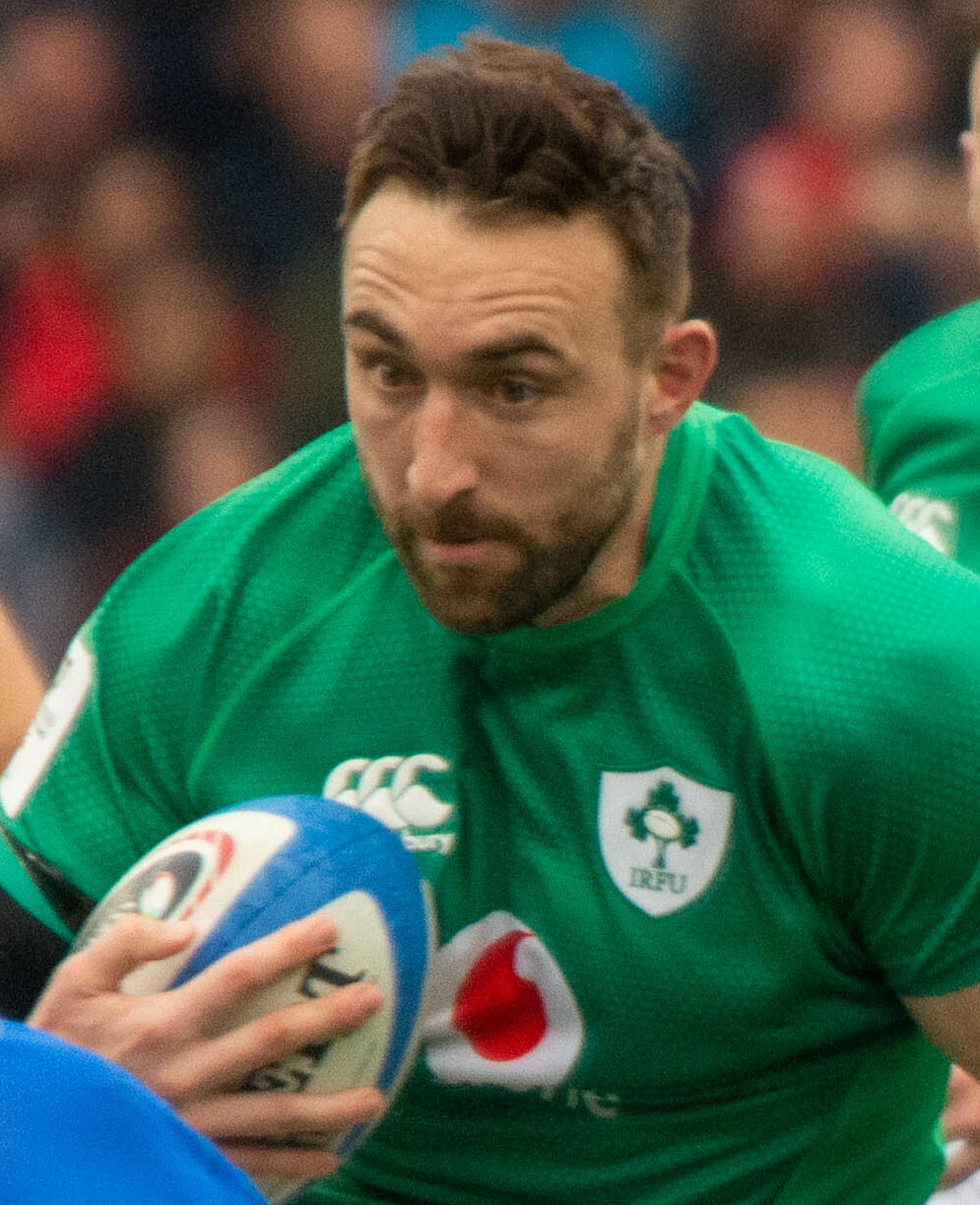
- Conan whilst playing for Ireland against Italy during the 2023 Six Nations
- Full name: Jack Edward Conan
- Born: 29 July 1992 (age 34) Bray, Ireland
- Height: 1.93 m (6 ft 4 in)
- Weight: 110 kg (243 lb; 17 st 5 lb)
- School: St. Gerard's School

Rugby union career
- Position: Number 8
- Current team: Leinster
Senior career
Years	Team	Apps	(Points)
2014–	Leinster	174	(180)
- Correct as of 21 March 2026
International career
Years	Team	Apps	(Points)
2012	Ireland U20	11	(25)
2015	Ireland Wolfhounds	1	(0)
2015–	Ireland	62	(80)
2021, 2025	British & Irish Lions	6	(0)
- Correct as of 18 July 2026

Jack Edward Conan (born 29 July 1992) is an Irish professional rugby union player who plays as a number eight for United Rugby Championship club Leinster and the Ireland national team. He has twice been selected for the British & Irish Lions.

== Professional career ==
=== Leinster ===
Conan made his senior debut in February 2014 against the Cardiff Blues. Conan was dropped from the Leinster senior squad for the 2014/15 season, one year ahead of scheduled completion of the academy. Conan was named man-of-the-match for his performance against Ulster on 3 January 2015, in a game where he led all forwards with 40 meters gained and 8 defenders beaten. On 13 January 2017, Conan scored a hat-trick in the 57–3 win against Montpellier in the European Rugby Champions Cup at the RDS. Conan gained his 100th Leinster cap in a Pro14 victory over Dragons on 19 February 2021. Conan scored the game's only try and was named Player of the Match in Leinster's 16–6 victory over Munster in the 2021 Pro14 Grand Final. In 2025, with injury to club captain Caelan Doris, Conan captained Leinster to their ninth domestic title overall in the 2025 United Rugby Championship Grand Final; it was his own fifth domestic title with the province, to add to the European Rugby Champions Cup title from the double winning year of 2018.

=== Ireland ===
Conan was one of only two uncapped players included in the extended Ireland rugby squad for the 2015 Six Nations Championship, but he did not play in any of Ireland's matches that tournament. He debuted for Ireland in a victory against Scotland at Lansdowne Road in an August 2015 Rugby World Cup warm-up match where he started at flanker. He did not make Ireland's 2015 World Cup squad, however, and did not play another match for Ireland for almost two years, until June 2017.

In February 2025, after impressive performances off the bench during the 2025 Six Nations and an injury to captain Caelan Doris, Conan was named in the starting lineup for the first time during the tournament against Wales. He scored a try in a 27–18 victory over Wales as they won the Triple Crown. Conan's international career has included three Six Nations Championships, four Triple Crowns and two Grand Slams.

=== British & Irish Lions ===
Conan was named in the squad for the 2021 British & Irish Lions tour to South Africa. He started all three Lions' test matches against South Africa.

In May 2025, he was named in the squad for the 2025 British & Irish Lions tour to Australia. Conan started at no. 8 in all three Test matches.

== Honours ==
Leinster

- 1× European Rugby Champions Cup: 2018
- 5 × United Rugby Championship / Pro14: 2018, 2019, 2020, 2021, 2025
  - 4 x URC Irish Shield: 2022, 2023, 2024, 2025

Ireland

- 3× Six Nations Championship: 2018, 2023, 2024
  - 2× Grand Slam: 2018, 2023
  - 5× Triple Crown: 2018, 2022, 2023, 2025, 2026

Individual

- 2x United Rugby Championship Team of the Year: 2016–17, 2017–18
