= Luke McGrath =

Irish rugby union player

- Born: 3 February 1993 (age 33) Hamilton, Ontario, Canada
- Height: 1.75 m (5 ft 9 in)
- Weight: 84 kg (13.2 st; 185 lb)
- School: St Michael's College
- University: University College Dublin

Rugby union career
- Position: Scrum-Half
Amateur team(s)
Years	Team	Apps	(Points)
- UCD
Senior career
Years	Team	Apps	(Points)
2012–2026	Leinster	253	(280)
- Correct as of 21 March 2026
International career
Years	Team	Apps	(Points)
2012–2013	Ireland U20	18	(18)
2014	Emerging Ireland	1	(0)
2016–	Ireland	19	(15)
- Correct as of 19 October 2019

Luke McGrath (born 3 February 1993) is an Irish rugby union player for Leinster. His preferred position is scrum-half. In March 2026, he announces that he will be joining French club USA Perpignan; starting in 2026-27 season.

== Leinster career ==
He made his Leinster senior debut in May 2012 against the Newport Gwent Dragons and represented Ireland at underage grades. In May 2014 it was announced that he had signed a contract to join the senior squad following promotion from the academy. In January 2024 McGrath reached a milestone 200th appearance for the province in 43–7 victory over Stade Français Paris at the Aviva Stadium.

== International career ==
Though born in Canada, McGrath was raised in Ireland and represents Ireland internationally.

== Honours ==
Leinster

- European Rugby Champions Cup (1): 2018
- United Rugby Championship (8): 2013, 2014, 2018, 2019, 2020, 2021, 2025, 2026

Emerging Ireland

- World Rugby Nations Cup (1): 2014

Individual

- Leinster Player of the year (1): 2016–17
