= James Ryan (rugby union, born 1996) =

British Lions & Ireland international rugby union player

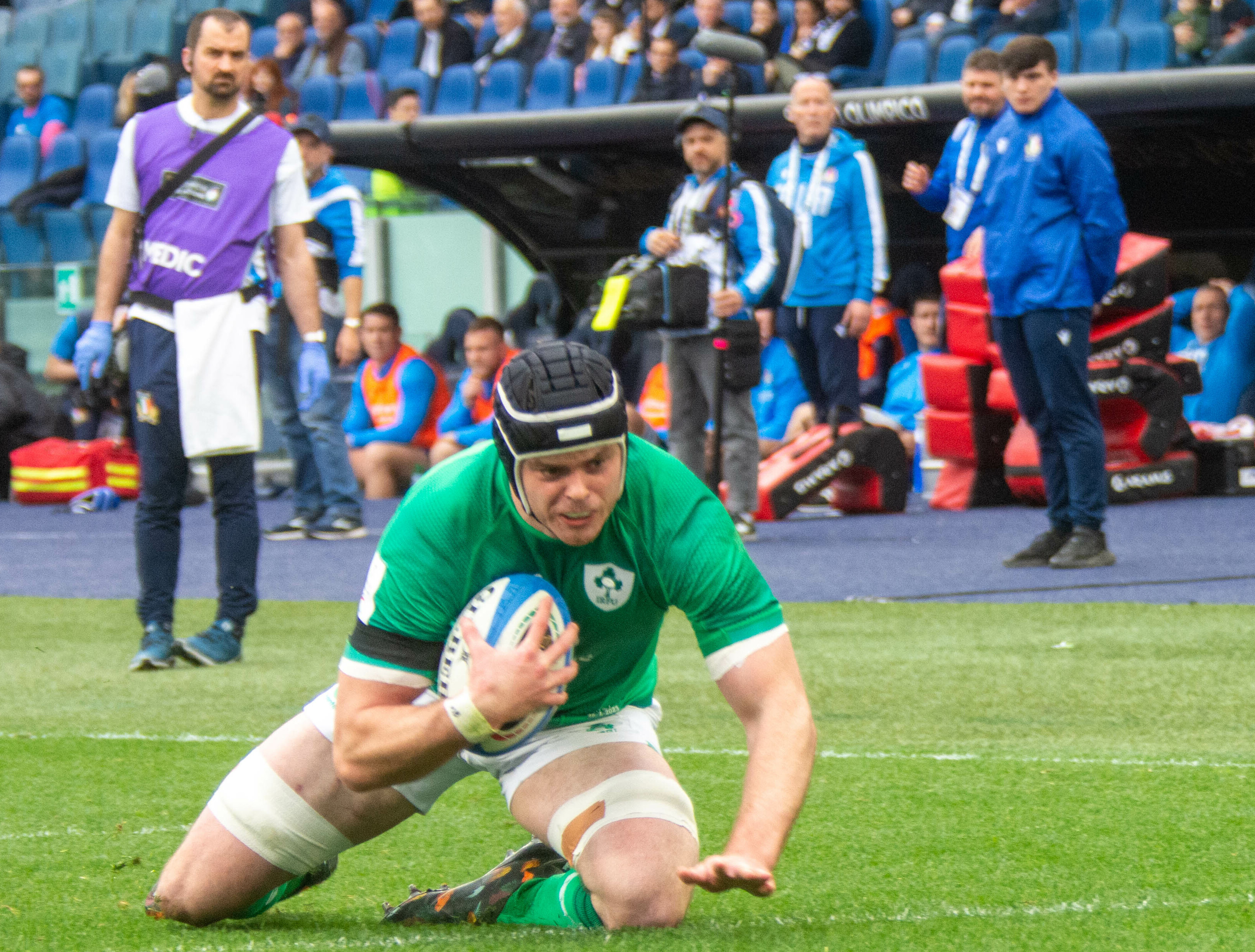
- Ryan playing at 2023 Six Nations Italy vs Ireland
- Born: 24 July 1996 (age 30) Blackrock, Ireland
- Height: 2.01 m (6 ft 7 in)
- Weight: 116 kg (256 lb; 18 st 4 lb)
- School: St. Michael's College
- University: University College Dublin
- Notable relative: James Ryan (great-grandfather)

Rugby union career
- Position: Lock
- Current team: Leinster
Senior career
Years	Team	Apps	(Points)
2017–	Leinster	104	(20)
- Correct as of 24 January 2026
International career
Years	Team	Apps	(Points)
2016	Ireland U20	9	(10)
2017–	Ireland	86	(25)
2025	British & Irish Lions	2	(0)
- Correct as of 21 November 2026

James John Ryan (born 24 July 1996) is an Irish professional rugby union player who plays as a lock for United Rugby Championship club Leinster and the Ireland national team.

== Early life ==
Ryan is the great-grandson of Dr. James Ryan, a prominent figure in Irish history who participated in the 1916 Easter Rising. Ryan was captain of the Ireland U20 team throughout the 2015–16 season, leading them to their best ever finish at the 2016 World Rugby Under 20 Championship, where they beat New Zealand U20 for the first time ever, eventually finishing as runners-up to England U20.

== Professional career ==
Ryan was granted a place in Leinster's academy for the 2016–17 season, but injury meant his season was badly disrupted. Nonetheless, he was given a full senior contract ahead of the 2017–18 season, despite having completed only one of the normal three academy years.

Ryan lined out for a Munster development side against the Ireland U20 team in Thomond Park on his way back from a hamstring injury to gain valuable game time ahead of Ireland's summer tour to Japan.

Ryan made his competitive debut for Leinster on 2 September 2017, coming off the bench in the province's opening 2017–18 Pro14 win against Dragons and playing for 21 minutes.

In November 2023 Ryan was named Leinster club co-captain alongside Garry Ringrose following the retirement of Johnny Sexton. During his time as co-captain, Ryan experienced some difficulties such as referees refusing to interact with him due to excessive communication. After holding this role for a season, they were replaced by Caelan Doris for the 2024 season.

On January 17, 2026, Ryan made his 50th appearance for Leinster in the Champions Cup, as the Irish side won 22–13 at Bayonne and secured its spot in the round of 16.

== International career ==
Ryan played for Ireland before making his competitive debut for Leinster in September 2017. Joe Schmidt called Ryan up to the senior Ireland squad for the first time ahead of the 2017 Summer Tour to the United States and Japan. On 10 June, in the one-off test against the United States, Ryan made his debut for Ireland, coming off the bench and scoring a try. In making his debut, Ryan became the first Irish player since Michael Bent in 2012 to make his senior Ireland debut before making his provincial debut.

He captained Ireland for the first time in their loss to England in the 2020 Autumn Nations Cup.

== Career statistics ==
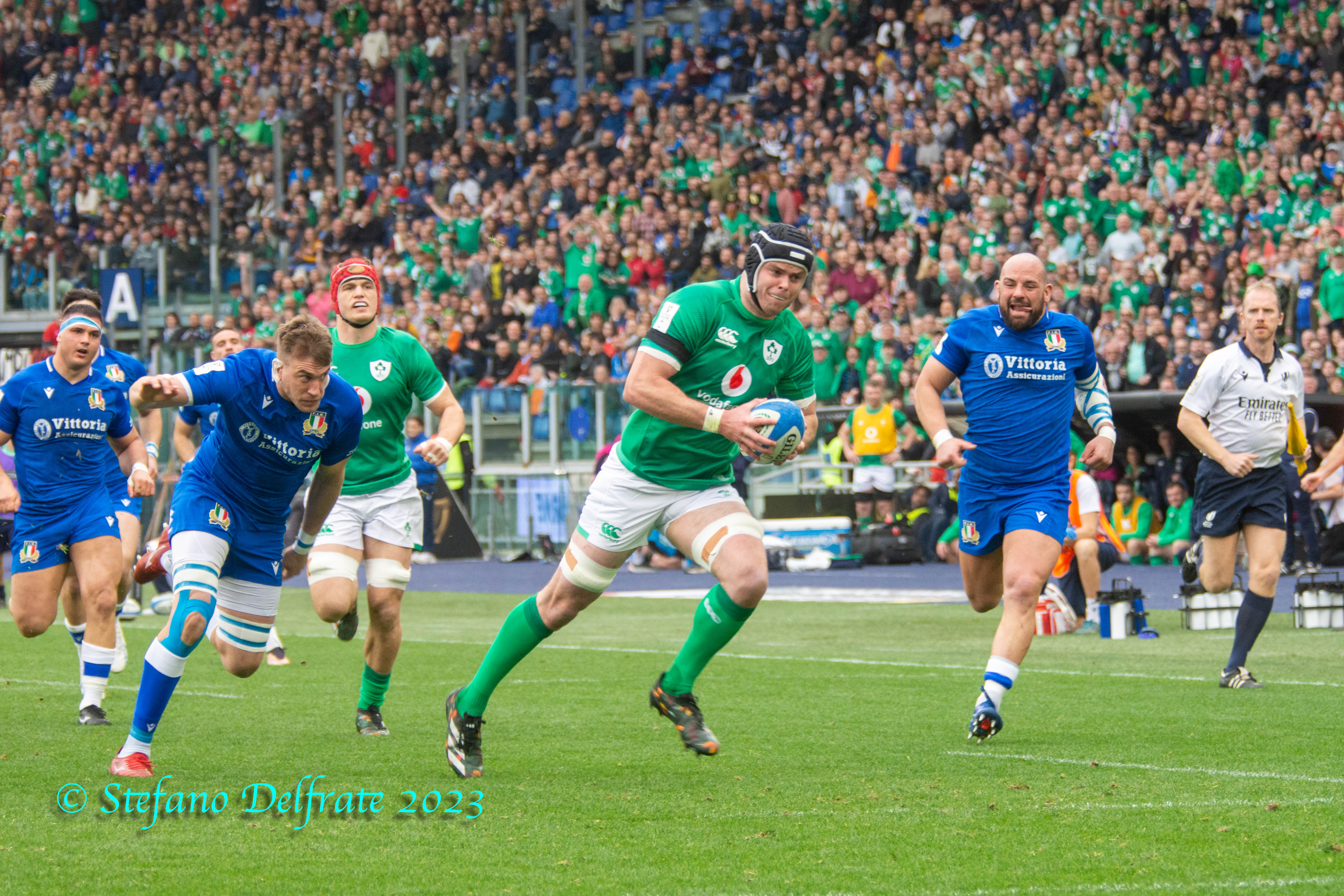
Ryan makes a break during the 2023 Six Nations.

=== International analysis by opposition ===
Opposition	Played	Win	Loss	Draw	Tries	Points	Win %
Argentina	4	4	0	0	0	0	100%
Australia	5	4	1	0	0	0	80%
England	8	5	3	0	0	0	62.5%
France	7	4	3	0	0	0	57.14%
Georgia	1	1	0	0	0	0	100%
Italy	5	5	0	0	1	5	100%
Japan	4	3	1	0	0	0	75%
New Zealand	7	4	3	0	0	0	57.14%
Romania	1	1	0	0	0	0	100%
Samoa	2	2	0	0	0	0	100%
Scotland	9	9	0	0	1	5	100%
South Africa	5	4	1	0	0	0	80%
Tonga	1	1	0	0	0	0	100%
United States	2	2	0	0	1	5	100%
Wales	11	9	2	0	2	10	81.82%
Career	72	58	14	0	5	25	80.56%

as of 24 July 2025

== Honours ==
Individual

- 1× IRUPA Players' Player of the Year: 2019

Leinster

- 1× European Rugby Champions Cup: 2018
- 5x Pro14/URC: 2018, 2019, 2020, 2021, 2024–25

Ireland

- 3× Six Nations Championship: 2018, 2023, 2024
- 2× Grand Slam: 2018, 2023
- 3× Triple Crown: 2018, 2022, 2023

== Personal life ==
He is the great-grandson of Irish politician and Easter Rising revolutionary James Ryan.
