= European Rugby Champions Cup =

Annual rugby union tournament

- Current season or competition: 2026–27 European Rugby Champions Cup
- Sport: Rugby union
- Inaugural season: 1995–96 as Heineken Cup; 2014–15 as Champions Cup
- Chairman: Dominic McKay
- Number of teams: 24
- Nations: England; France; Ireland; Italy; Scotland; Wales; South Africa (2022–23 season onwards); Romania (1995–96 only)
- Holders: (France) Bordeaux Bègles (2nd title) (2025–26)
- Most titles: (France) Toulouse (6 titles)
- Website: epcrugby.com/champions-cup
- Related competitions: European Rugby Challenge Cup (2nd tier); European Rugby Continental Shield

The European Rugby Champions Cup (known as the Investec Champions Cup for sponsorship reasons) is an annual rugby union tournament organised by European Professional Club Rugby (EPCR). It is the top-tier competition for clubs who compete in a predominantly European league. Clubs qualify for the Champions Cup via their final positions in their respective national/regional leagues (English Premiership, French Top 14 and United Rugby Championship) or via winning the second-tier Challenge Cup; those that do not qualify are instead eligible to compete in the second-tier Challenge Cup.

Between 1995 and 2014, the equivalent competition was known as the Heineken Cup and was run by European Rugby Cup. Following disagreements between its shareholders over the structure and governance of the competition, it was taken over by EPCR and its name was changed to the European Rugby Champions Cup, without title sponsorship. Heineken returned as sponsor for the 2018–19 season, resulting in the competition being known as the Heineken Champions Cup. Although they are technically two separate competitions, run by different organisations, the European Rugby Cup and the European Rugby Champions Cup are recognised as one title chain of elite club championships in Europe, with teams that have won multiple titles ranked, for example, by the aggregate of their wins in both versions.

French clubs have the highest number of victories (14 wins), followed by England (10 wins) and Ireland (7 wins). England has the largest number of winning teams, with six clubs having won the title. The competition has been won by thirteen different clubs, eight of which have won it more than once, and five successfully defended their title including a unique three-in-a-row made by Toulon between 2012–13 and 2014–15. Toulouse is the most successful club in the tournament's history, having won it 6 times, including the first season of the tournament in the 1995–96 season, and appearing in eight finals. Leinster have also appeared in nine finals, winning four of them; both clubs have reached twice as many finals as any other club. Bordeaux are the current European champions, having beaten Leinster 41-19 in the 2026 final in Bilbao, Spain. Toulouse have completed "the Double" (Heineken Cup/European Rugby Champions Cup-National Championship) 3 times (1995–96, 2020–21 and 2023–24), a record in Europe.

== History ==
=== Heineken Cup ===
==== 1995–1999 ====
The Heineken Cup logo used until 2013

The Heineken Cup was launched in the summer of 1995 on the initiative of the then Five Nations Committee to provide a new level of professional cross border competition. Twelve sides representing Ireland, Wales, Italy, Romania and France competed in four pools of three with the group winners going directly into the semi-finals. English and Scottish teams did not take part in the inaugural competition. From an inauspicious beginning in Romania, where Toulouse defeated Farul Constanţa 54–10 in front of a small crowd, the competition gathered momentum and crowds grew. Toulouse went on to become the first European cup winners, eventually beating Cardiff in extra time in front of a crowd of 21,800 at Cardiff Arms Park.

Clubs from England and Scotland joined the competition in 1996–97. European rugby was further expanded with the advent of the European Challenge Cup for teams that did not qualify for the Heineken Cup. The Heineken Cup now had 20 teams divided into four pools of five. Only Leicester and Brive reached the knock-out stages with 100 per cent records and ultimately made it to the final, Cardiff and Toulouse falling in the semi-finals. After 46 matches, Brive beat Leicester 28–9 in front of a crowd of 41,664 at Cardiff Arms Park, the match watched by an estimated television audience of 35 million in 86 countries.

The season 1997–98 saw the introduction of a home and away format in the pool games. The five pools of four teams, which guaranteed each team a minimum of six games, and the three quarter-final play-off matches all added up to a 70-match tournament. Brive reached the final again but were beaten late in the game by Bath with a penalty kick. English clubs then decided to withdraw from the competition for the following year in a dispute over the way it was run.

The 1998–99 tournament revolved around France, Italy and the Celtic nations. Sixteen teams took part in four pools of four. French clubs filled the top positions in three of the groups and for the fourth consecutive year a French club, in the shape of Colomiers from the Toulouse suburbs, reached the final. Despite this it was to be Ulster's year as they beat Toulouse (twice) and reigning French champions Stade Français on their way to the final at Lansdowne Road, Dublin. Ulster then carried home the trophy after a 21–6 win over Colomiers in front of a capacity 49,000 crowd.

==== 1999–2004 ====
English clubs returned in 1999–00. The pool stages were spread over three months to allow the competition to develop alongside the nations' own domestic competitions, and the knockout stages were scheduled to take the tournament into the early spring. For the first time clubs from four nations – England, Ireland, France and Wales – made it through to the semi-finals. Munster's defeat of Toulouse in Bordeaux ended France's record of having contested every final and Northampton Saints' victory over Llanelli made them the third English club to make it to the final. The competition was decided with a final between Munster and Northampton, with Northampton coming out on top by a single point to claim their first major honour.

England supplied two of the 2000–01 semi-finalists – Leicester Tigers and Gloucester – with Munster and French champions Stade Français also reaching the last four. Both semi-finals were close, Munster going down by a point 16–15 to Stade Français in Lille and the Tigers beating Gloucester 19–15 at Vicarage Road, Watford. The final, at Parc des Princes, Paris, attracted a crowd of 44,000 and the result was in the balance right up until the final whistle, but Leicester walked off 34–30 winners.

Munster reached the 2001–02 final with quarter-final and semi-final victories on French soil against Stade Français and Castres. Leicester pipped Llanelli in the last four, after the Scarlets had halted Leicester's 11-match Heineken Cup winning streak in the pool stages. A record crowd saw Leicester become the first side to successfully defend their title.

From 2002, the European Challenge Cup winner now automatically qualified for the Heineken Cup. Toulouse's victory over French rivals Perpignan in 2003 meant that they joined Leicester as the only teams to win the title twice. Toulouse saw a 19-point half-time lead whittled away as the Catalans staged a dramatic comeback in a match in which the strong wind and showers played a major role, but Toulouse survived to win.

In 2003–04 the Welsh Rugby Union (WRU) voted to create regions to play in the Celtic League and represent Wales in European competition. Henceforth, Wales entered regional sides rather than the club sides that had previously competed. English side London Wasps had earned their first final appearance by beating Munster 37–32 in a Dublin semi-final while Toulouse triumphed 19–11 in an all-French contest with Biarritz in a packed Stade Chaban-Delmas in Bordeaux. The 2004 final saw Wasps defeat defending champions Toulouse 27–20 at Twickenham to win the Heineken Cup for the first time. The match was widely hailed as one of the best finals. With extra time looming at 20–20, a late opportunist try by scrum half Rob Howley settled the contest.

==== 2005–2014 ====
The tenth Heineken Cup final saw the inaugural champions Toulouse battle with rising stars Stade Français when Murrayfield was the first Scottish venue to host the final. Fabien Galthié's Paris side led until two minutes from the end of normal time before Frédéric Michalak levelled the contest for Toulouse with his first penalty strike. He repeated this in the initial stages of extra time and then sealed his side's success with a superb opportunist drop-goal. Toulouse became the first team to win three Heineken Cup titles.

In 2006, Munster defeated Biarritz in the Millennium Stadium, Cardiff, 23–19. It was third time lucky for the Irish provincial side, who had previously been denied the ultimate prize twice by Northampton and Leicester in finals, in addition to a series of tight semi-final losses. Munster's history of heartbreaking near misses, large away followings and their enduring close connection to the tournament provided much of the romantic narrative of the early years of the competition.

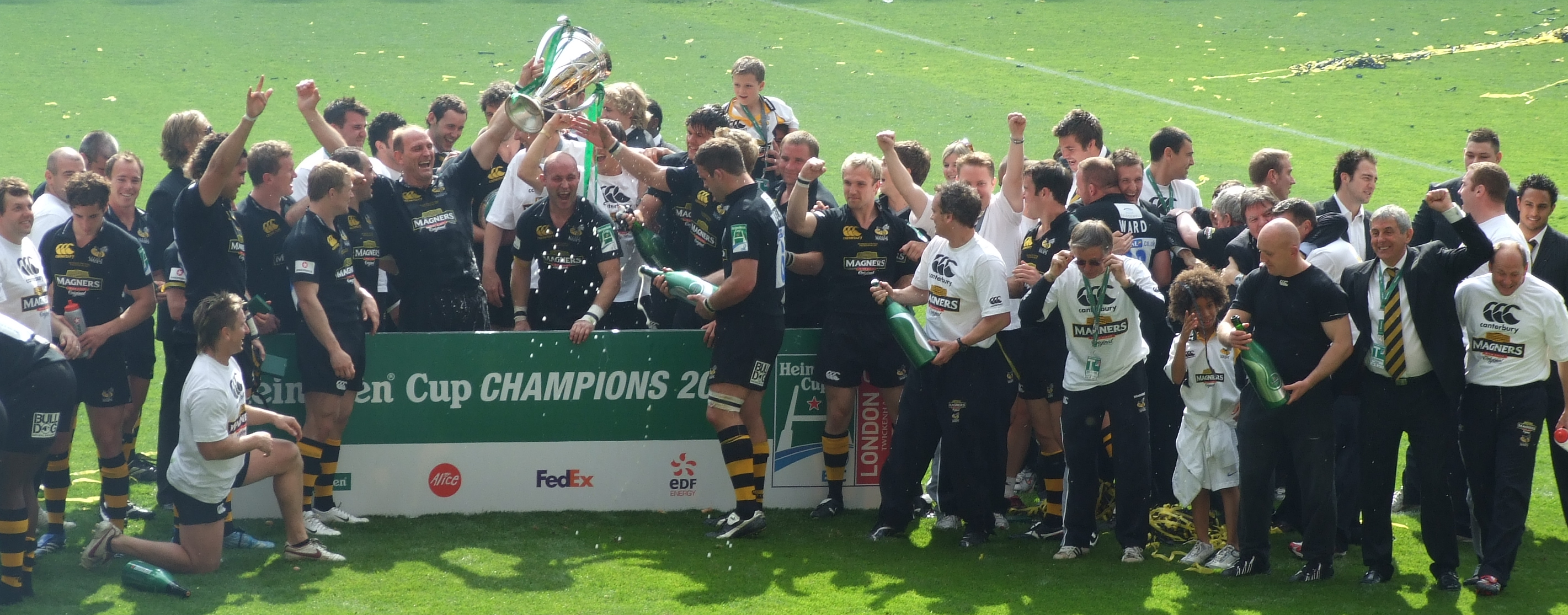
London Wasps celebrate after winning the 2006–07 Heineken Cup.

The 2006–07 Heineken Cup would be distributed to over 100 countries following Pitch International's securing of the rights. That season was the first time in the history of the competition that two teams went unbeaten in pool play, with both Llanelli Scarlets and Biarritz doing so. Biarritz went into their final match at Northampton Saints with a chance to become the first team ever to score bonus-point wins in all their pool matches, but were only able to score two of the four tries needed. Leicester defeated Llanelli Scarlets to move into the final at Twickenham, with the possibility of winning a Treble of championships on the cards, having already won the Anglo-Welsh Cup and the English Premiership. However, Wasps won the final 25 points to 9 in front of a tournament record 81,076 fans.

During competition there was uncertainty over the future of the tournament after the 2006–07 season as French clubs had announced that they would not take part because of fixture congestion following the Rugby World Cup and an ongoing dispute between English clubs and the RFU. It was speculated that league two teams might compete the next season, the RFU saying "If this situation is not resolved, the RFU owes it to the sport to keep this competition going...We have spoken to our FDR clubs, and if they want to compete we will support them.". A subsequent meeting led to the announcement that the tournament would be played in 2007–08, with clubs from all the six nations. On 20 May it was announced that both French and English top-tier teams would be competing

In the 2008 final, Munster won the cup for their second time ever by beating Toulouse at the Millennium Stadium in Cardiff.

Leinster won the title in 2009 in their first ever final after beating Munster in the semi-final in front of a then world record Rugby Union club match attendance in Croke Park. They beat the Leicester Tigers in the final at Murrayfield Stadium in Edinburgh. They also beat Harlequins 6–5 in the quarter-finals at Twickenham Stoop, in the Bloodgate scandal.

In the 2010 final, Toulouse defeated Biarritz Olympique in the Stade de France to claim their fourth title, a Heineken Cup record.

The 16th Heineken Cup tournament in 2011 resulted in an Irish province lifting the title for the fourth time in six years as Leinster recorded their second triumph in the competition. They defeated former multiple Heineken Cup winners Leicester and Toulouse in the quarter- and semi-finals. At the Millennium Stadium in Cardiff, in front of 72,000 spectators, Leinster fought back from a 22–6 half-time deficit in the final against Northampton Saints, scoring 27 unanswered points in 26 second-half minutes, winning 33–22 in one of the tournament's greatest comebacks. Johnny Sexton won the man-of-the-match award, having scored 28 of Leinster's points total, which included two tries, three conversions and four penalties.

Leinster successfully defended their crown in 2012 at Twickenham, eclipsing fellow Irish province and former champions Ulster 42–14 to establish the highest Heineken Cup final winning margin. The performance broke a number of Heineken Cup Final records. Leinster became only the second team to win back-to-back titles and the only team ever to win three championships in four years. In addition, the game had the highest attendance at a final (81,774), the highest number of tries (5) and points (42) scored by one team and the highest points difference (28).

The final edition of the tournament as constituted as the Heineken Cup was won for a second time by Toulon at the Millennium Stadium in Cardiff in May 2014.

=== Champions Cup ===
==== 2014–18 ====
The tournament began on 17 October 2014, with Harlequins playing Castres Olympique in the first ever Champions Cup game. Toulon retained their title, beating Clermont 24–18 in a repeat of the 2013 Heineken Cup Final, thereby becoming the first club to win three European titles in a row.

Following the November 2015 Paris attacks, all Round 1 games due to take place in France that weekend were called off, along with the Round 2 fixture between Stade Français and Munster. Rescheduling of some matches was difficult, partly caused by fixture congestion due to the 2015 Rugby World Cup.

Saracens won their first title defeating Racing 92 in Lyon 21–9 in 2016 final and followed it up with their second in 2017, beating Clermont 28–17 in Edinburgh.

In 2017–18 season, Leinster overcame the "pool of death" consisting of Glasgow Warriors (who finished the 2017–18 season top of the Pro14), Montpellier (who finished the 2017–18 season top of the TOP 14) and Exeter (who finished the 2017–18 season top of the English Premiership), beating all three teams both home and away. Leinster went on to face the back to back Champions Saracens, dispatching a defeat at the Aviva Stadium in Dublin, to set up a semi-final against reigning Pro12 champions Scarlets. Leinster defeated Scarlets to face Racing 92 in Champions Cup Final in Bilbao. Leinster defeated Racing 92 by a scoreline of 15–12, becoming only the second team in history to earn four European titles. Leinster also won the Pro14 title to become the first Pro14 side to win the domestic-European 'Double'.

=== Heineken Champions Cup ===
==== 2018–2020 ====
Saracens won the 2018–19 competition, defeating defending champions Leinster 20–10 in the final. Saracens were in breach of the Premiership salary cap during this edition and the previous year, in which they qualified for the 2018–19 cup. However, the EPCR have confirmed that Premiership ruling will not affect the results of the Heineken Champions Cup for 2018–19 or previous years, stating: "The Saracens decision is based on Gallagher Premiership Rugby regulations and does not affect the club's European record or current status in the Heineken Champions Cup." There were no Saracens representatives at the launch of the 2019–20 competition, held in Cardiff on 6 November 2019. EPCR released a statement saying they were "disappointed to learn of Saracens' decision to make their club representatives unavailable for today's official 2019–20 season launch".

==== 2020–2023 ====
Because of the COVID-19 pandemic the 2020–21 competition took on a revised format based on a hybrid of the round-robin and Swiss systems. A similar, but revised 24 team format took place for 2021–22 and 2022-23.

=== Investec Champions Cup ===
On 31 August 2023, Investec, a bank and wealth management company with operations in South Africa and Europe, and the European Professional Club Rugby announced Investec would take over as title sponsor of the competition. The tournament moved away from the COVID-19 influenced hybrid system back toward a more straightforward, if still modified, round-robin pool format, while retaining the balance of four pool matches and four knock-out weekends.

== Format ==
=== Qualification ===
Typically, a total of 24 teams qualify for the competition, the same number as used to qualify for the Heineken Cup. At least 23 of the 24 teams qualify automatically based on position in their respective leagues. The winner of the Challenge Cup will earn a place regardless of league position.

Team distribution is typically:

- England: 8 teams, based on position in Premiership Rugby allowing for the Challenge Cup entry route;
- France: 8 teams, based on position in the Top 14, again allowing for the Challenge Cup entry route;
- South Africa, Ireland, Italy, Scotland and Wales: 8 teams, based on performance in the United Rugby Championship (previously the Pro14).
  - From 2014 to 2017, the best placed team from each country in the Pro14 qualified for the competition, along with the best three remaining teams regardless of nationality;
  - In 2017, it was announced that this format would change. Starting with qualification for the 2018–19 competition, the Pro14 places would be assigned regardless of nationality, rather than the requirement that at least one team qualify from each participating nation.

==== 20th team qualification (2014–2019) ====
Until 2018–19, the final team each season qualified through a play-off competition between the best placed unqualified teams.

- For the 2014–15 season, this was a two legged play-off between the seventh-placed teams in the Top 14 and the English Premiership. The team with the highest aggregate score over the two legs advancing to the Champions Cup.
- For the 2015–16 season, there was a three-team play-off; the seventh-placed team in the English Premiership, or the winners of the 2014–15 European Rugby Challenge Cup if members of the English Premiership and not already qualified, would play the eighth-placed (or highest non-qualified) team from the Pro14, with the winner playing the seventh-placed team in the Top 14.
- To facilitate Rugby World Cup 2015, there were no play-offs for the 2016–17 Champions Cup with the 20th place going to the winner of the 2016 Challenge Cup if not already qualified.
- For 2017–18, the play-off format included four clubs with a second Pro14 club competing. If not already qualified, the winner of the Challenge Cup will take the place in the play-offs of the seventh-ranked club in the English Premiership and Top 14, and will also take the place of the second Pro14 club if applicable.
- In May 2017, it was announced that, starting with qualification for the 2018–19 Champions Cup, the play-off will be scrapped in favour of awarding the final berth using the following criteria:
1. Champions Cup winner, if not already qualified.
2. European Rugby Challenge Cup winner, if not already qualified.
3. Challenge Cup losing finalist, if not already qualified.
4. Challenge Cup semi-finalist, if one has not already qualified (or the winner of a play-off between the semi-finalists, if both have not already qualified).
5. Highest ranked non-qualified club by virtue of league position from the same league as the Champions Cup winner.

=== Competition ===
==== Group stage ====
For the pool stage teams are placed into pools via a draw. The teams are ranked based on domestic league performance the previous season and arranged into four tiers. Teams are then drawn from the tiers into pools at random, with the restriction that no team will be drawn in the same pool as another team from the same league and tier. The nature of the draw means that sides will have a relatively even spread of matches across venues, leagues and tiers.

Teams play the two other teams in their pool from each different league once, home or away, and match points are awarded depending on the result of each game, with teams receiving four points for a win and two for a draw. Teams can also earn bonus points for scoring four or more tries and/or for losing a match by seven points or fewer.

Following the completion of the pool stage, 16 teams qualify for the knock-out stage of the Champions Cup with a further 4 of the remaining 8 dropping into the Challenge Cup. The final four teams are eliminated

==== Knock-out stage ====
The sixteen remaining teams are seeded from 1–16 based on performance in their respective pool. The top two teams in each of the four pools gain home advantage in the round of 16, with the teams finishing third and fourth playing away The quarter-finals are non-bracketed and follow the standard 1v8, 2v7, 3v6, 4v5 format, as found in the Heineken Cup.

The winners of the quarter-finals will contest the two semi-finals, Up to and including the 2014–15 season, matches and home country advantage were determined by a draw by EPCR.

In 2015–16, EPCR decided to put a new procedure in place. In lieu of the draw that used to determine the semi-final pairing, EPCR announced that the fixed semi-final bracket would be set in advance and that the home team would be designated based on "performances by clubs during the pool stages as well as the achievement of a winning a quarter-final match away from home". Semi-final matches must have been played at a neutral ground in the designated home team's country.

Since 2018–19, the higher-seeded team will have home country/venue advantage for each semi-final regardless of whether they won their quarter-final at home or on the road. The EPCR may now also use its discretion to allow semi-finals to be played at a qualified club's home venue.

Winner QF 1	Winner QF 2	Semi-final (home v away)
1	4	1 v 4
1	5	1 v 5
8	4	4 v 8
8	5	5 v 8

Winner QF 3	Winner QF 4	Semi-final (home v away)
3	2	2 v 3
3	7	3 v 7
6	2	2 v 6
6	7	6 v 7

The winners of the semi-finals will contest the final, which will be held in May each season.

==== 2020–2023 ====
Because of the COVID-19 pandemic in Europe the 2020–21 competition took on a revised format. In this edition, the teams were split up into two separate pools of 12, in which they would play four games against opponents from their pool, before the top four teams from each of the two pools advanced to the knockout stage, made up of two-legged quarter-finals and a single legged semi-finals and final. However, due to the increasing spread of the virus, only two rounds were played before the competition was suspended, and instead the top eight teams from each of the two pools advanced to the knockout stage, with all matches being single-legged affairs.

A similar format remained for 2021–22, with the top eight teams from each of the two pools advancing to the knockout stage, which featured a two-legged Round of 16 before a single-legged quarter-finals, semi-finals and final. The 2022-23 campaign will retain the same pool format, but, like 2020–21, all knockout stage games will be single-legged.

==== 2023–present ====
A further change took place from 2023-4, with four pools of six teams. The winners of the three leagues (the URC, the Premiership and the Top 14), along with the winner of the previous season's Champions Cup, are drawn into separate pools. Where the Champions Cup winner also wins its own league, the Champions Cup runner-up takes the fourth place in the draw. The other teams are drawn so that each six-team pool contains two teams from each of the three leagues.

Within the four pools, each of the teams plays once against the other four teams that are not from its own league, with two games at home and two away. The top four teams from each pool qualify for the round of 16, with the top two teams enjoying home advantage. The fifth-placed team in each pool drops into the round of 16 of the Challenge Cup. The bottom-placed team is eliminated.

The four knock-out rounds continue to be single-legged. In the round of 16 and quarter-finals, the team with a higher ranking from the pool stages has home stadium advantage. The semi-finals are held in a venue selected by EPCR in the country of the higher-ranked team. The final is in a predetermined major stadium.

== Finals ==
Twickenham has been the most common venue for the final, holding the event on six occasions. The Millennium Stadium in Cardiff has held five finals and its predecessor stadium on the same site a further two, but the latter stadium was completely demolished to build the Millennium, so the two are treated as two separate venues. The site, however, holds the record for most finals, seven. The final has been held twice in a nation that is not part of the competition; San Mamés Stadium, Bilbao in Spain held both the 2018 final and the 2026 final. As of 2024 the final has never been held in South Africa or Italy. Nigel Owens from Wales holds the record for most appearances by a referee in the final, with seven.

Key
†	Match was won during extra time

Heineken Cup era
Season	Winners	Score	Runners-up	Venue	Att	Referee
1995–96	(France) Toulouse	21–18†	(Wales) Cardiff	(Wales) National Stadium, Cardiff	21,800	(Ireland) David McHugh
1996–97	(France) Brive	28–9	(England) Leicester Tigers	(Wales) National Stadium, Cardiff	41,664	(Wales) Derek Bevan
1997–98	(England) Bath	19–18	(France) Brive	(France) Parc Lescure, Bordeaux	36,500	(Scotland) Jim Fleming
1998–99	(Ireland) Ulster	21–6	(France) Colomiers	(Ireland) Lansdowne Road, Dublin	49,000	(Wales) Clayton Thomas
1999–00	(England) Northampton Saints	9–8	(Ireland) Munster	(England) Twickenham Stadium, London	68,441	(France) Joël Dumé
2000–01	(England) Leicester Tigers	34–30	(France) Stade Français	(France) Parc des Princes, Paris	44,000	(Ireland) David McHugh
2001–02	(England) Leicester Tigers (2)	15–9	(Ireland) Munster	(Wales) Millennium Stadium, Cardiff	74,600	(France) Joël Jutge
2002–03	(France) Toulouse (2)	22–17	(France) Perpignan	(Ireland) Lansdowne Road, Dublin	28,600	(England) Tony Spreadbury (Note: Chris White started the 2001 Heineken Cup final as referee, before withdrawing in the 12th minute due to injury, to be replaced by reserve official Tony Spreadbury .)
2003–04	(England) London Wasps	27–20	(France) Toulouse	(England) Twickenham Stadium, London	73,057	(Ireland) Alain Rolland
2004–05	(France) Toulouse (3)	18–12†	(France) Stade Français	(Scotland) Murrayfield Stadium, Edinburgh	51,326	(England) Chris White
2005–06	(Ireland) Munster	23–19	(France) Biarritz	(Wales) Millennium Stadium, Cardiff	74,534	(England) Chris White
2006–07	(England) London Wasps (2)	25–9	(England) Leicester Tigers	(England) Twickenham Stadium, London	81,076	(Ireland) Alan Lewis
2007–08	(Ireland) Munster (2)	16–13	(France) Toulouse	(Wales) Millennium Stadium, Cardiff	74,500	(Wales) Nigel Owens
2008–09	(Ireland) Leinster	19–16	(England) Leicester Tigers	(Scotland) Murrayfield Stadium, Edinburgh	66,523	(Wales) Nigel Owens
2009–10	(France) Toulouse (4)	21–19	(France) Biarritz	Stade de France, Saint-Denis	78,962	(England) Wayne Barnes
2010–11	(Ireland) Leinster (2)	33–22	(England) Northampton Saints	(Wales) Millennium Stadium, Cardiff	72,456	(France) Romain Poite
2011–12	(Ireland) Leinster (3)	42–14	(Ireland) Ulster	(England) Twickenham Stadium, London	81,774	(Wales) Nigel Owens
2012–13	(France) Toulon	16–15	(France) Clermont	(Ireland) Aviva Stadium, Dublin	50,198	(Ireland) Alain Rolland
2013–14	(France) Toulon (2)	23–6	(England) Saracens	(Wales) Millennium Stadium, Cardiff	67,586	(Ireland) Alain Rolland
Champions Cup era
2014–15	(France) Toulon (3)	24–18	(France) Clermont	(England) Twickenham Stadium, London	56,622	(Wales) Nigel Owens
2015–16	(England) Saracens	21–9	(France) Racing 92	(France) Parc Olympique Lyonnais, Lyon	58,017	(Wales) Nigel Owens
2016–17	(England) Saracens (2)	28–17	(France) Clermont	(Scotland) Murrayfield Stadium, Edinburgh	55,272	(Wales) Nigel Owens
2017–18	(Ireland) Leinster (4)	15–12	(France) Racing 92	(Spain) San Mamés Stadium, Bilbao	52,282	(England) Wayne Barnes
2018–19	(England) Saracens (3)	20–10	(Ireland) Leinster	(England) St James' Park, Newcastle	51,930	(France) Jérôme Garcès
2019–20	(England) Exeter Chiefs	31–27	(France) Racing 92	(England) Ashton Gate Stadium, Bristol	0 (Note: The 2020 final was played behind closed doors due to the COVID-19 pandemic in Europe.)	(Wales) Nigel Owens
2020–21	(France) Toulouse (5)	22–17	(France) La Rochelle	(England) Twickenham Stadium, London	10,000 (Note: Capacity limited to 10,000 due to national restrictions surrounding the COVID-19 pandemic.)	(England) Luke Pearce
2021–22	(France) La Rochelle	24–21	(Ireland) Leinster	(France) Stade Vélodrome, Marseille	59,682	(England) Wayne Barnes
2022–23	(France) La Rochelle (2)	27–26	(Ireland) Leinster	(Ireland) Aviva Stadium, Dublin	51,711	(South Africa) Jaco Peyper
2023–24	(France) Toulouse (6)	31–22†	(Ireland) Leinster	(England) Tottenham Hotspur Stadium, London	61,531	(England) Matthew Carley
2024–25	(France) Bordeaux Bègles	28–20	(England) Northampton Saints	(Wales) Millennium Stadium, Cardiff	70,225	(Georgia (country)) Nika Amashukeli
2025–26	(France) Bordeaux Bègles (2)	41–19	(Ireland) Leinster	(Spain) San Mames Stadium, Bilbao	52,327	(England) Karl Dickson

=== Finals by club ===
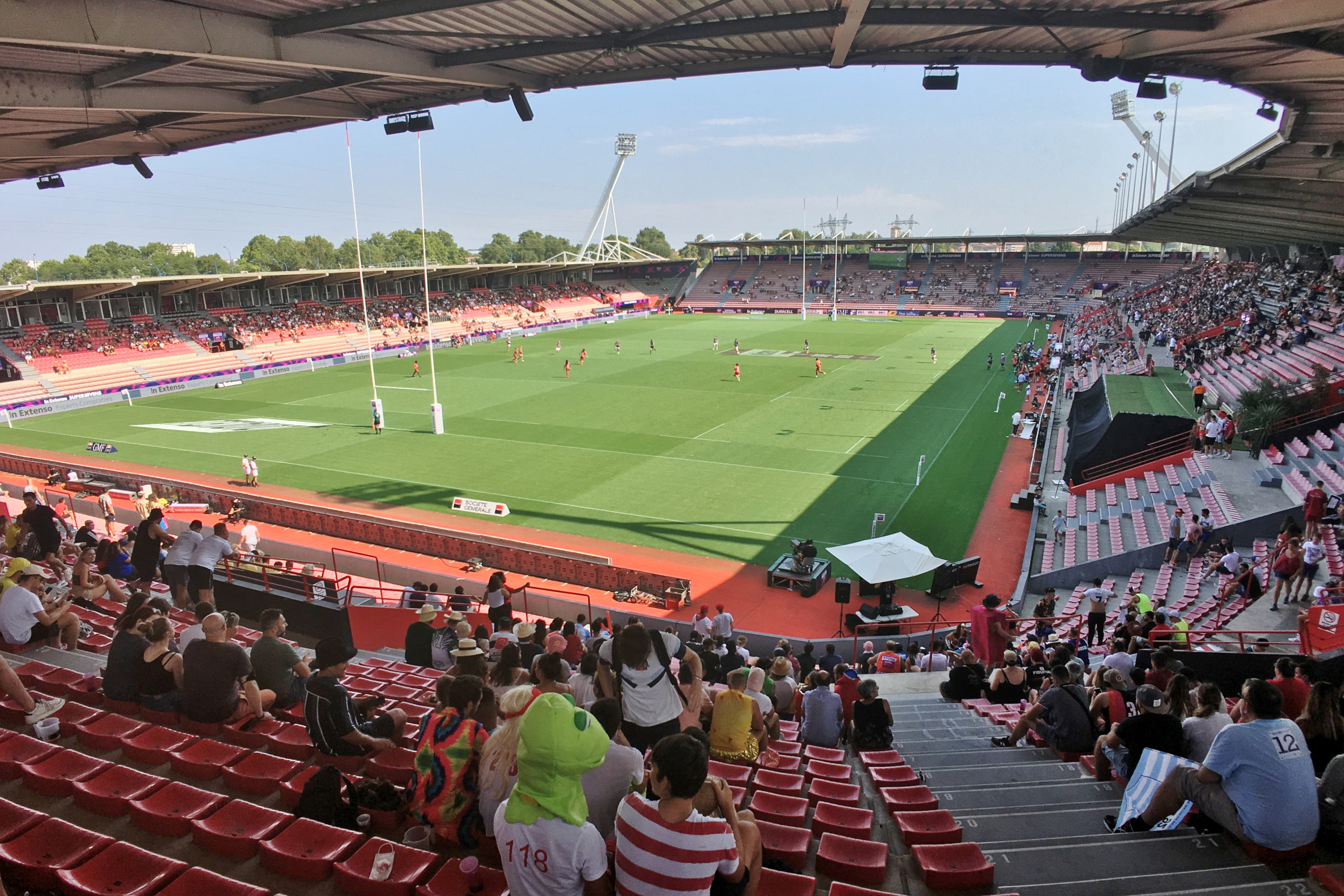
Stade Ernest-Wallon, stadium of the most successful club in the tournament's history

Club	Champions	Runners-up	Years as champions	Years as runners-up
(France) Toulouse	6	2	1995–96, 2002–03, 2004–05, 2009–10, 2020–21, 2023–24	2003–04, 2007–08
(Ireland) Leinster	4	5	2008–09, 2010–11, 2011–12, 2017–18	2018–19, 2021–22, 2022–23, 2023–24, 2025–26
(England) Saracens	3	1	2015–16, 2016–17, 2018–19	2013–14
(France) Toulon	3	0	2012–13, 2013–14, 2014–15	—
(England) Leicester Tigers	2	3	2000–01, 2001–02	1996–97, 2006–07, 2008–09
(Ireland) Munster	2	2	2005–06, 2007–08	1999–00, 2001–02
(France) La Rochelle	2	1	2021–22, 2022–23	2020–21
(England) Wasps	2	0	2003–04, 2006–07	—
(France) Bordeaux Bègles	2	0	2024–25, 2025–26	—
(England) Northampton Saints	1	2	1999–00	2010–11, 2024–25
(France) Brive	1	1	1996–97	1997–98
(Ireland) Ulster	1	1	1998–99	2011–12
(England) Bath	1	0	1997–98	—
(England) Exeter Chiefs	1	0	2019–20	—
(France) Clermont	0	3	—	2012–13, 2014–15, 2016–17
(France) Racing 92	0	3	—	2015–16, 2017–18, 2019–20
(France) Stade Français	0	2	—	2000–01, 2004–05
(France) Biarritz	0	2	—	2005–06, 2009–10
(Wales) Cardiff	0	1	—	1995–96
(France) Colomiers	0	1	—	1998–99
(France) Perpignan	0	1	—	2002–03

=== Wins by nation ===
Nation	Winners	Runners-up
France	14	16
England	10	6
Ireland	7	8
Wales	0	1
Scotland	0	0
Italy	0	0
South Africa	0	0

== Records and statistics ==
=== Player records ===
Note that in the case of career statistics, only those clubs for which each player appeared in European Cup fixtures (i.e. Heineken Cup or Champions Cup) are listed.

==== Career records ====
Up to date as of 27 May 2025

===== Tries =====
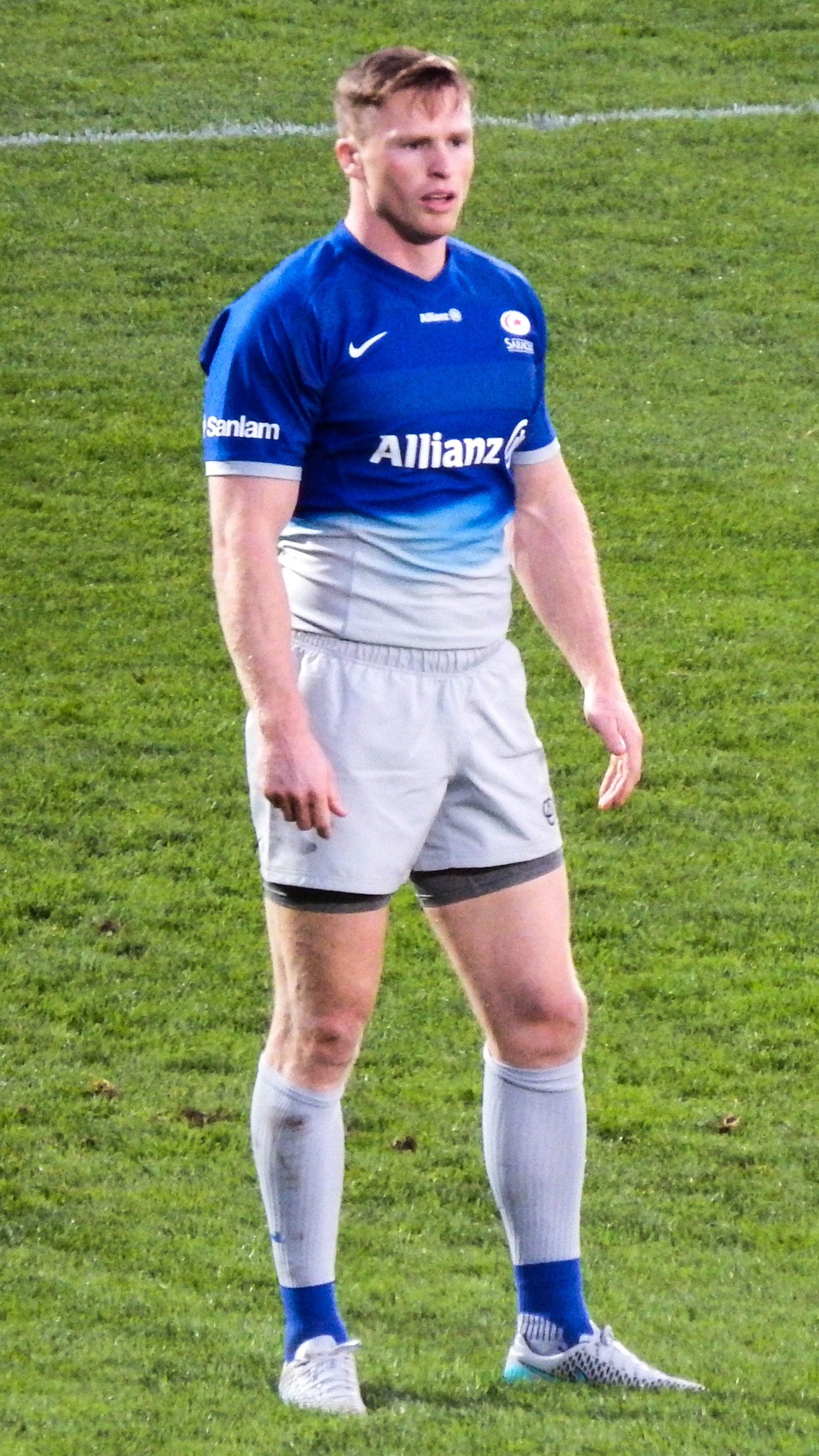
Chris Ashton playing for Saracens in 2015

Rank	Player	Club(s)	Games	Tries	Try Ratio
1	(England) Chris Ashton	Northampton Saints, Saracens, Toulon, Sale Sharks, Leicester Tigers	70	41	0.59
2	(France) Vincent Clerc	Toulouse	83	36	0.43
3	(Ireland) Simon Zebo	Munster, Racing	68	35	0.51
4	(Ireland) Brian O'Driscoll	Leinster	87	33	0.38
4	(Argentina) Juan Imhoff	Racing 92	63	33	0.52
6	**(Ireland) James Lowe**	Leinster	39	31	0.79
7	(Ireland) Tommy Bowe	Ulster, Ospreys	66	29	0.44
7	(Wales) Dafydd James	Pontypridd, Llanelli, Bridgend, Celtic Warriors, Harlequins, Scarlets	60	29	0.48
9	(Ireland) Andrew Trimble	Ulster	71	27	0.38
9	(Ireland) Shane Horgan	Leinster	87	27	0.31
9	**(France) Antoine Dupont**	Castres, Toulouse	51	27	0.53
9	**(France) Damian Penaud**	Clermont, Bordeaux	33	27	0.82
13	(Ireland) Gordon D'Arcy	Leinster	104	26	0.25
14	(Ireland) Geordan Murphy	Leicester Tigers	74	25	0.34
14	(Fiji) Naipolioni Nalaga	Clermont	37	25	0.68

- Players in **BOLD** still playing for an EPCR qualified team.

===== Points =====
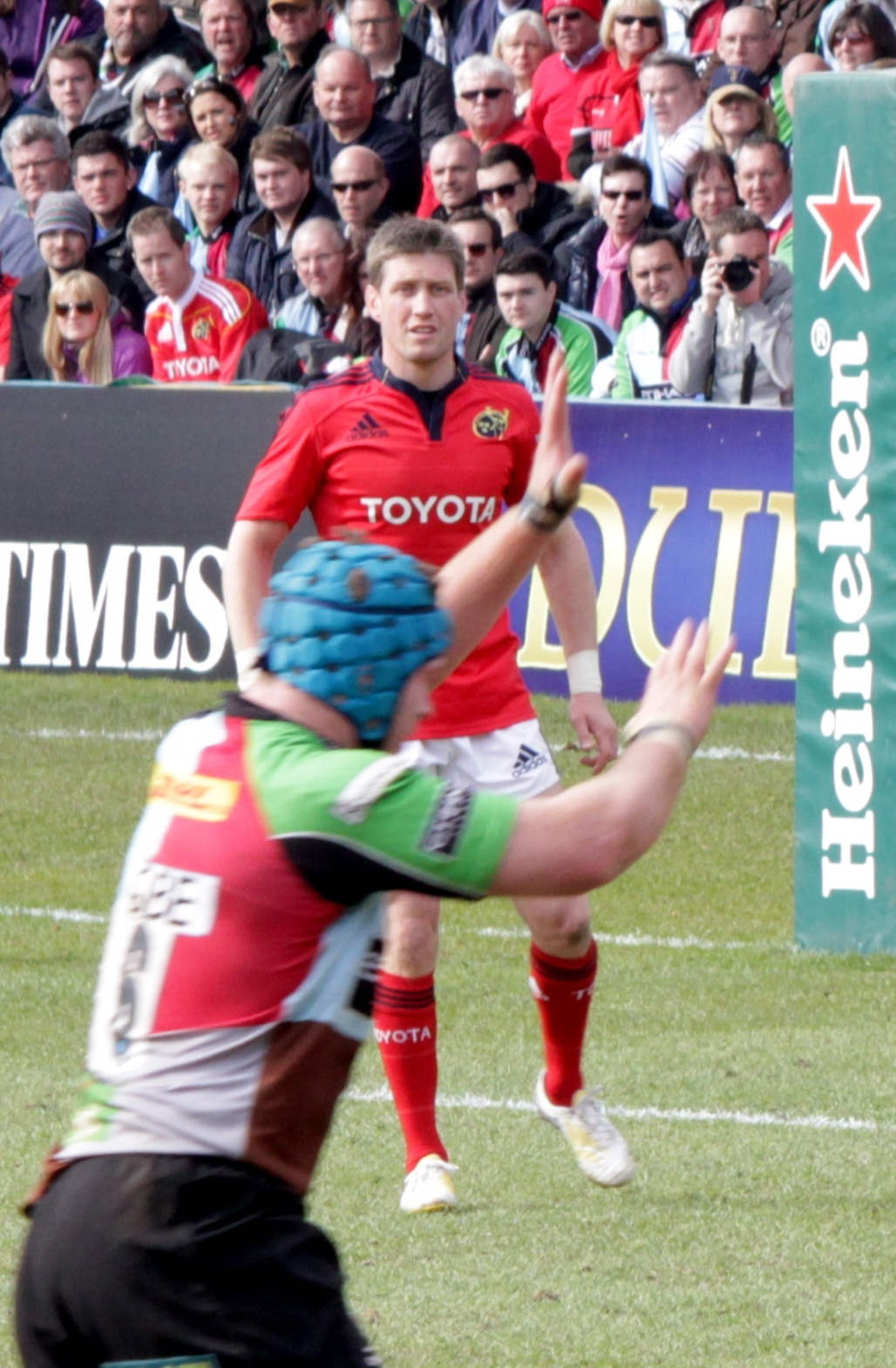
Ronan O'Gara (background) playing for Munster in 2013

Rank	Player	Club(s)	Points
1	(Ireland) Ronan O'Gara	Munster	1,365
2	(England) **Owen Farrell**	Saracens	874
3	(Wales) Stephen Jones	Llanelli, Clermont Auvergne, Scarlets	869
4	(Ireland) Johnny Sexton	Leinster, Racing Métro 92	784
5	(France) Dimitri Yachvili	Biarritz	661
6	(Italy) Diego Domínguez	Milan, Stade Français	645
7	(Wales) Dan Biggar	Ospreys, Northampton Saints, Toulon	634
8	(France) Morgan Parra	Bourgoin, Clermont Auvergne	569
9	(Ireland) David Humphreys	Ulster	564
10	(Wales) Leigh Halfpenny	Cardiff Blues, Toulon, Scarlets, Harlequins	523

- Players in **BOLD** still playing for an EPCR qualified team.

===== Goals =====
The number of goals includes both penalties and conversions.

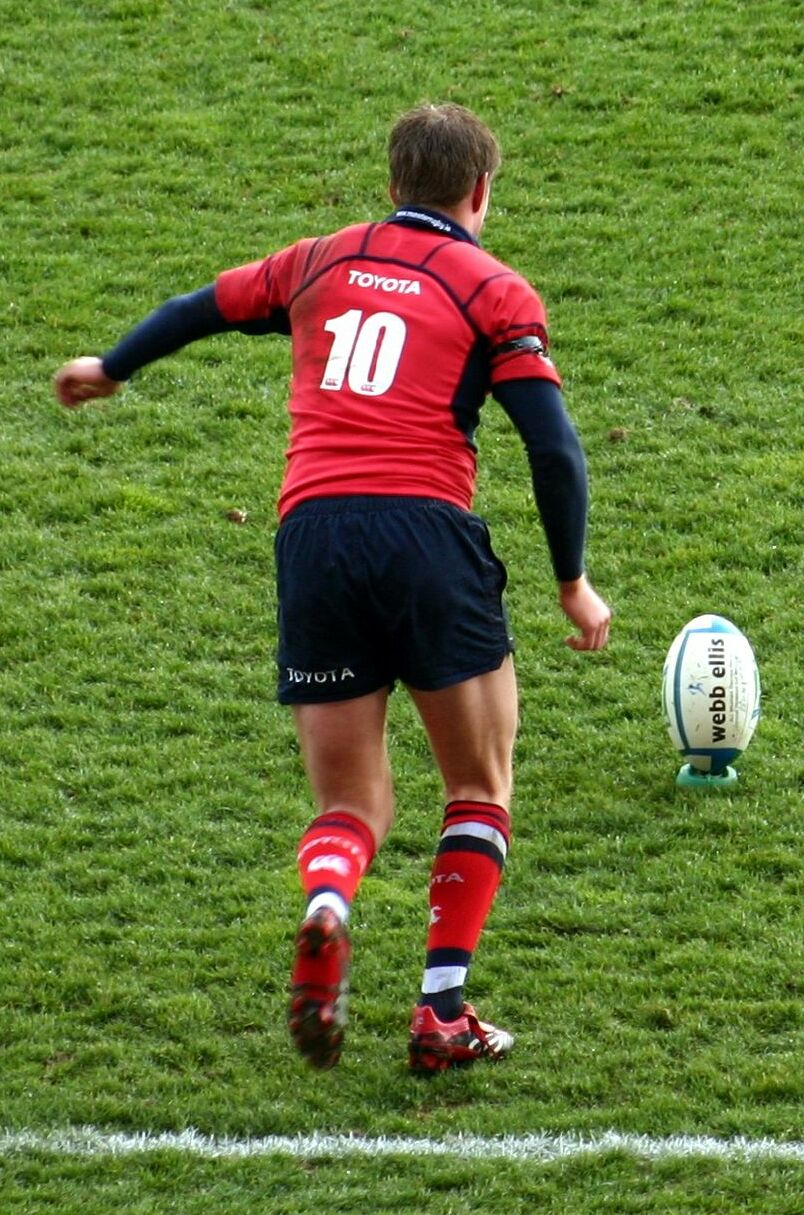
Ronan O'Gara playing for Munster in 2006

Rank	Player	Club(s)	Goals
1	(Ireland) Ronan O'Gara	Munster	488
2	(England) **Owen Farrell**	Saracens, Racing Métro 92	352
3	(Wales) Stephen Jones	Llanelli, Clermont Auvergne, Scarlets	313
4	(Ireland) Johnny Sexton	Leinster, Racing Métro 92	294
5	(France) Dimitri Yachvili	Biarritz	235
6	(Italy) Diego Domínguez	Milan, Stade Français	231
7	(Wales) Dan Biggar	Ospreys, Northampton Saints, Toulon	223
8	(France) Morgan Parra	Clermont, Bourgoin	220
9	(Wales) Leigh Halfpenny	Cardiff Blues, Toulon, Scarlets, Harlequins	176
9	(Wales) Neil Jenkins	Pontypridd, Cardiff RFC, Celtic Warriors	176

- Players in **BOLD** still playing for an EPCR qualified team.

===== Appearances =====
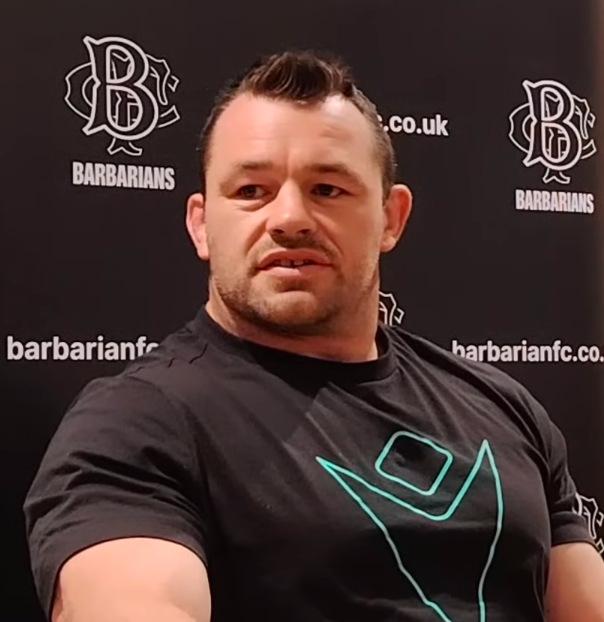
Cian Healy with Barbarian F.C., before his last professional rugby match, in 2025

Rank	Player	Club(s)	Games
1	(Ireland) Cian Healy	Leinster	114
2	(Ireland) Ronan O'Gara	Munster	110
3	(Ireland) Gordon D'Arcy	Leinster	104
4	(Ireland) John Hayes	Munster	101
4	(Ireland) Peter Stringer	Munster, Saracens, Bath, Sale	101
6	(England) Richard Wigglesworth	Sale Sharks, Saracens	99
7	(Ireland) Donncha O'Callaghan	Munster	97
8	(France) Clément Poitrenaud	Toulouse	96
9	(Ireland) Leo Cullen	Leinster, Leicester Tigers	92
10	(France) Benjamin Kayser	Stade Français Paris, Leicester Tigers, Castres Olympique, ASM Clermont Auvergne	90

- Players in **BOLD** still playing for an EPCR qualified team.

===== Titles =====
Up to date as of 24 May 2026

Rank	Titles	Player	Club(s)	Years Won
1	6	(France) Frédéric Michalak	Toulouse (3); Toulon (3)	2003; 2005; 2010; 2013; 2014*; 2015*
2	4	(France) Cédric Heymans	Brive (1); Toulouse (3)	1997; 2003; 2005; 2010
2	4	(Ireland) Cian Healy	Leinster (4)	2009; 2011; 2012; 2018
2	4	(Fiji) Isa Nacewa	Leinster (4)	2009; 2011; 2012; 2018
2	4	(Ireland) Johnny Sexton	Leinster (4)	2009; 2011; 2012; 2018
2	4	(Ireland) Devin Toner	Leinster (4)	2009; 2011; 2012; 2018
2	4	(Australia) **Will Skelton**	Saracens (2); La Rochelle (2)	2017*; 2019; 2022; 2023
2	4	(France) **Arthur Retière**	Stade Rochelais (1); Stade Toulousain (1); Union Bordeaux Bègles (2)	2022; 2024*; 2025; 2026
*Titles inclusive of any season in which a player played during the tournament even if they did not appear in the final.

- Players in **BOLD** still playing for an EPCR qualified team.

==== Single season records ====
Single season records up to date as of 20 December 2023

===== Tries =====
Damian Penaud has the record both for the highest number of tries scored in a single season and the best try-scoring ratio among players with at least eight tries.

Rank	Player	Club	Season	Tries	Games	Ratio
1	(France) Damian Penaud	Bordeaux Bègles	2024–25	14	8	1.75
2	(England) Chris Ashton	Saracens	2013–14	11	9	1.22
3	(France) Sébastien Carrat	Brive	1996–97	10	7	1.43
3	(Ireland) James Lowe	Leinster	2021–22	10	7	1.43
3	(France) Louis Bielle-Biarrey	Bordeaux Bègles	2025–26	10	8	1.25
6	(Wales) Matthew Robinson	Swansea	2000–01	9	7	1.29
6	(England) Tommy Freeman	Northampton Saints	2024–25	9	8	1.13
8	(Fiji) Timoci Matanavou	Toulouse	2011–12	8	6	1.33
8	(France) Louis Bielle-Biarrey	Bordeaux Bègles	2024-25	8	6	1.33
8	(Ireland) Shane Horgan	Leinster	2004–05	8	7	1.14
8	(France) Gaël Dréan	Toulon	2025-26	8	7	1.14
8	(England) Sam Simmonds	Exeter Chiefs	2019–20	8	8	1
8	(Fiji) Napolioni Nalaga	Clermont	2012–13	8	9	0.89

===== Points =====
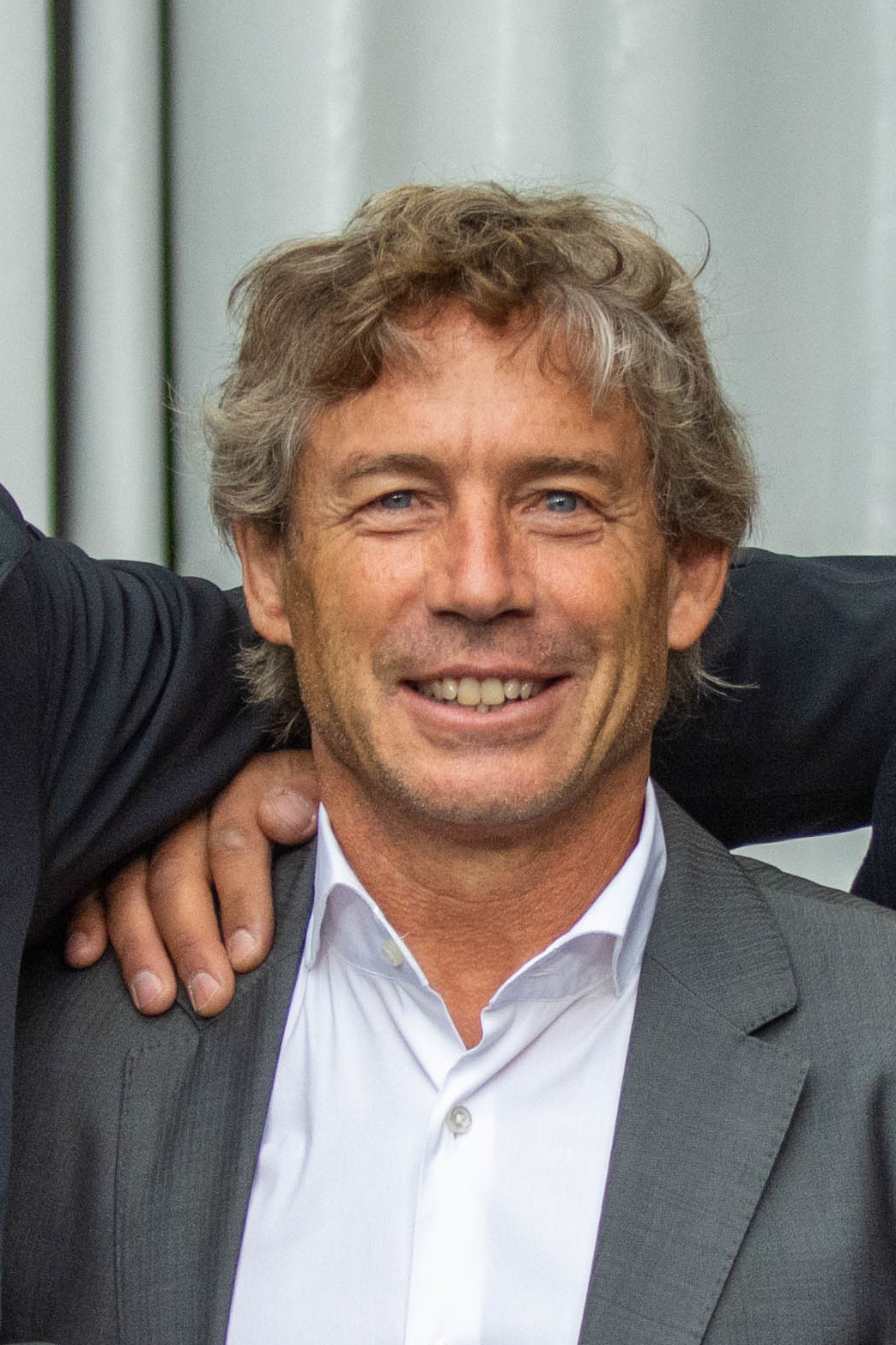
Diego Domínguez at an Italy game in 2021

Rank	Player	Club	Season	Points
1	(Italy) Diego Domínguez	Stade Français	2000–01	188
2	(England) Tim Stimpson	Leicester Tigers	2000–01	152
3	(Ireland) Simon Mason	Ulster	1998–99	144
4	(Ireland) Johnny Sexton	Leinster	2010–11	138
5	(Wales) Lee Jarvis	Cardiff	1997–98	134
6	(Ireland) Ronan O'Gara	Munster	1999–00	131
7	(England) Jonathan Callard	Bath	1997–98	129
7	(Argentina) Felipe Contepomi	Leinster	2005–06	129
7	(Ireland) Ronan O'Gara	Munster	2001–02	129
10	(Ireland) Ronan O'Gara	Munster	2000–01	127
10	(England) Owen Farrell	Saracens	2015–16	127

==== European Player of the Year ====
The European Player of the Year award was introduced by ERC in 2010. Ronan O'Gara received the inaugural award, being recognised as the best player over the first 15 years of ERC tournaments. Following the creation of the European Rugby Champions Cup, the new organisers, EPCR, continued to award a Player of the Year accolade, with the first going to Clermont full-back Nick Abendanon. In the 2016/17 season it was announced that the award would change name to the Anthony Foley Memorial Award after the passing of Munster Head Coach. The first winner of this since the change in title was Saracens fly half Owen Farrell.

Year	Player	Club	Reference
2010	(Ireland) Ronan O'Gara	(Ireland) Munster	
2011	(Ireland) Seán O'Brien	(Ireland) Leinster	
2012	(Ireland) Rob Kearney	(Ireland) Leinster	
2013	(England) Jonny Wilkinson	(France) Toulon	
2014	(England) Steffon Armitage	(France) Toulon	
2015	(England) Nick Abendanon	(France) Clermont	
2016	(England) Maro Itoje	(England) Saracens	
2017	(England) Owen Farrell	(England) Saracens	
2018	(Fiji) Leone Nakarawa	(France) Racing 92	
2019	(England) Alex Goode	(England) Saracens	
2020	(England) Sam Simmonds	(England) Exeter	
2021	(France) Antoine Dupont	(France) Toulouse	
2022	(Ireland) Josh van der Flier	(Ireland) Leinster	
2023	(France) Grégory Alldritt	(France) La Rochelle	
2024	(France) Antoine Dupont	(France) Toulouse	
2025	(France) Damian Penaud	(France) Bordeaux Bègles	
2026	(France) Louis Bielle-Biarrey	(France) Bordeaux Bègles	

=== Title-winning coaches ===
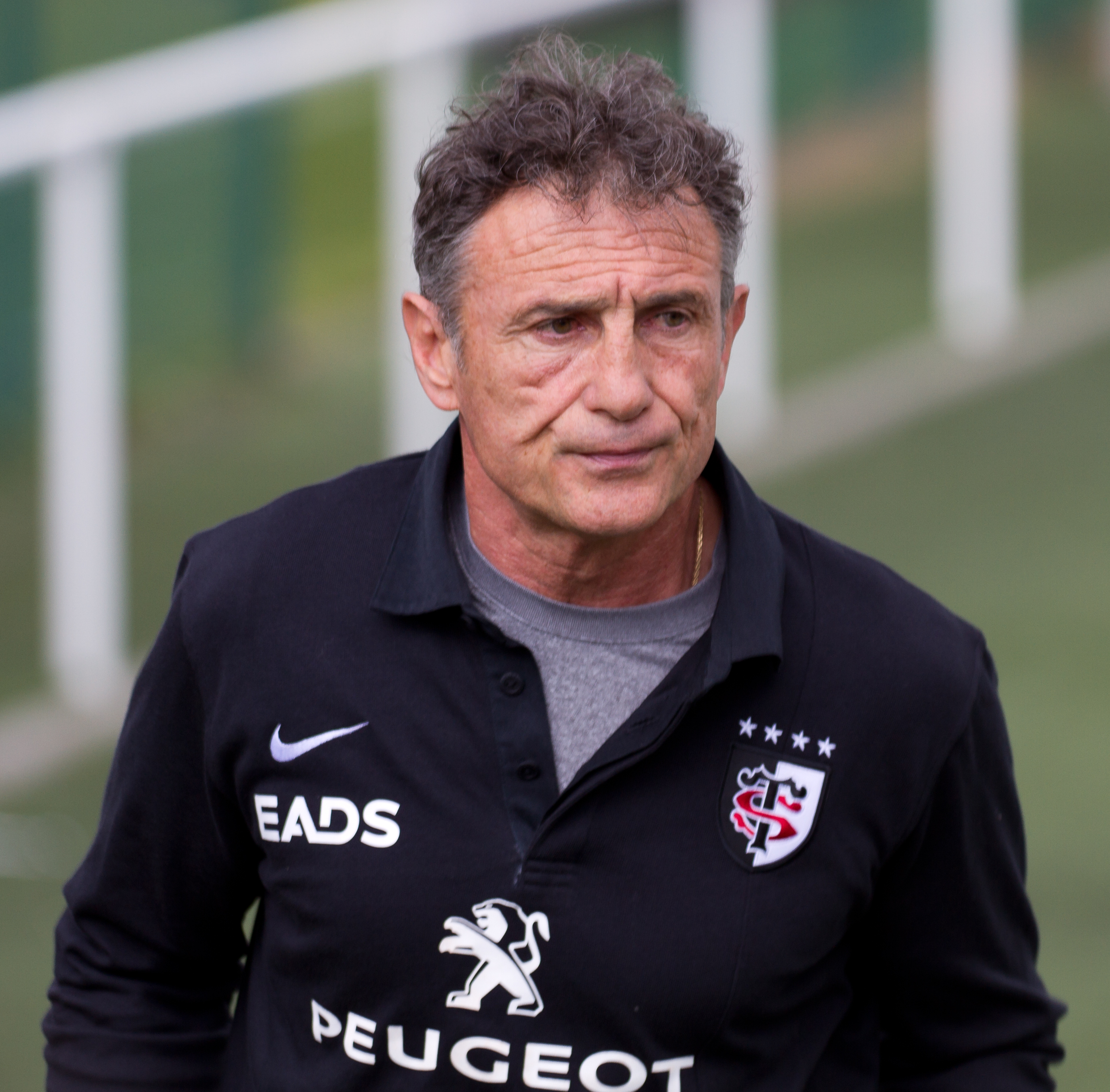
Guy Novès, the only coach to have won the tournament on four occasions

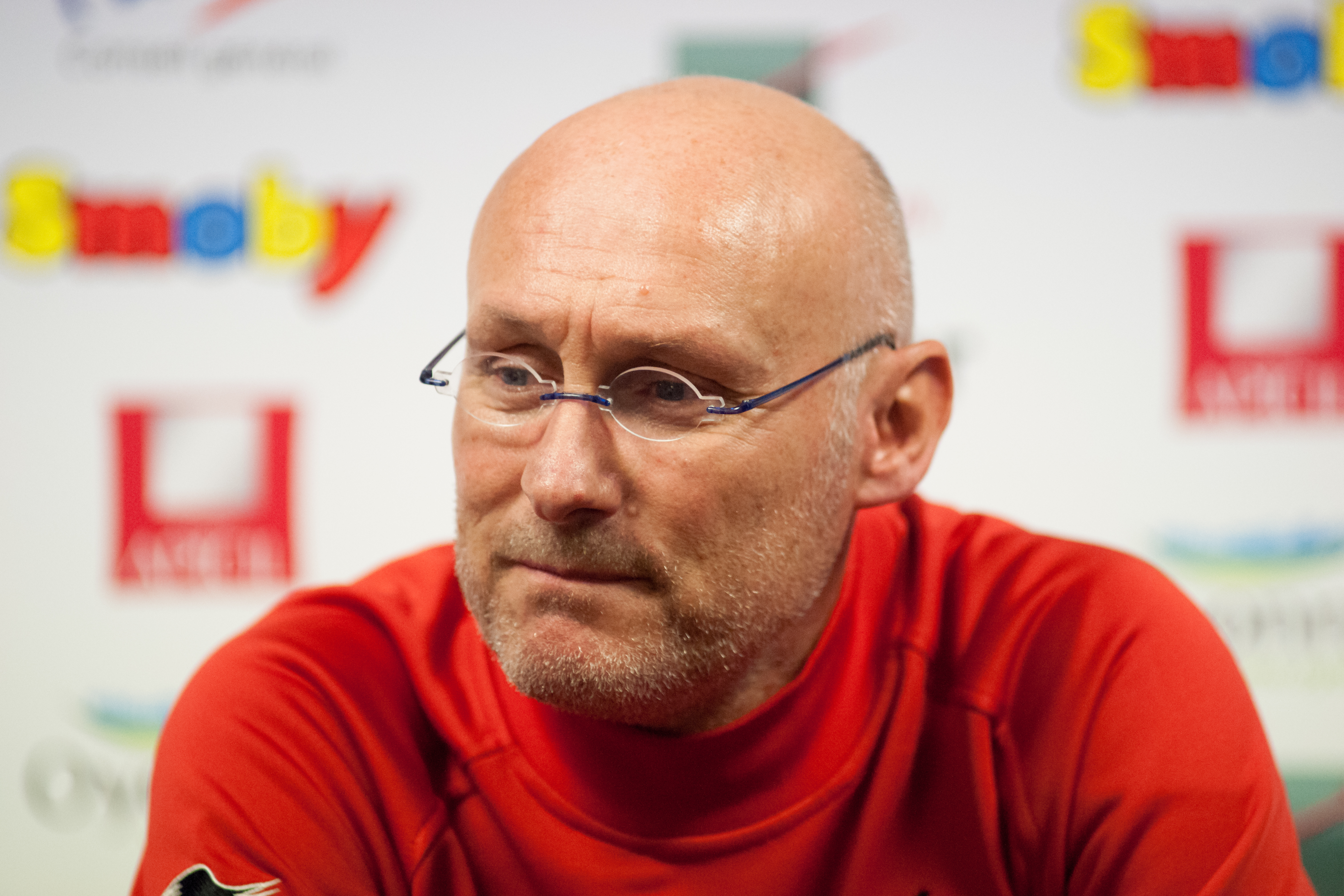
Bernard Laporte, the only coach to have won the tournament three times in a row

Wins	Coach	Club(s)
4	(France) Guy Novès	(France) Toulouse (1996, 2003, 2005, 2010)
3	(France) Bernard Laporte	(France) Toulon (2013, 2014, 2015)
3	(Ireland) Mark McCall	(England) Saracens (2016, 2017, 2019)
2	(England) Dean Richards	(England) Leicester Tigers (2001, 2002)
2	(Ireland) Declan Kidney	(Ireland) Munster (2006, 2008)
2	(New Zealand) Joe Schmidt	(Ireland) Leinster (2011, 2012)
2	(Ireland) Ronan O'Gara	(France) La Rochelle (2022, 2023)
2	(France) Ugo Mola	(France) Toulouse (2021, 2024)
2	(France) Yannick Bru	(France) Bordeaux Bègles (2025, 2026)
1	(France) Laurent Seigne	(France) Brive (1997)
1	(England) Andy Robinson	(England) Bath (1998)
1	(Ireland) Harry Williams	(Ireland) Ulster (1999)
1	(England) John Steele	(England) Northampton Saints (2000)
1	(New Zealand) Warren Gatland	(England) London Wasps (2004)
1	(Scotland) Ian McGeechan	(England) London Wasps (2007)
1	(Australia) Michael Cheika	(Ireland) Leinster (2009)
1	(Ireland) Leo Cullen	(Ireland) Leinster (2018)
1	(England) Rob Baxter	(England) Exeter Chiefs (2020)

== Sponsorship and suppliers ==
=== Sponsors ===
During the creation of the Champions Cup, former organisers ERC had been criticised for "failing to maximise the commercial potential" of the Heineken Cup. New organisers EPCR pledged to move from a single title sponsor format to a Champions League-style partner system, with 2–3 primary partners projected for the inaugural tournament and 5 being the ultimate target. However, only Heineken agreed to sign up for the 2014–15 season, at a much reduced price from that which they had been paying previously.

==== Principal partners ====
- Heineken (1995–2014; 2018–)

Heineken, who had sponsored the Heineken Cup since 1995, signed on as the first partner for the Champions Cup in 2014 and were credited as the Founding Partner of European Rugby. They returned to the competition as title sponsors in 2018, resulting in it being renamed as the "Heineken Champions Cup". Due to French restrictions on alcohol advertising, it is known as the "H Cup" in France.

- Turkish Airlines (2015–2017)

Announced as the second principal partner at the 2015–16 tournament launch, signing on for three seasons

=== Suppliers ===
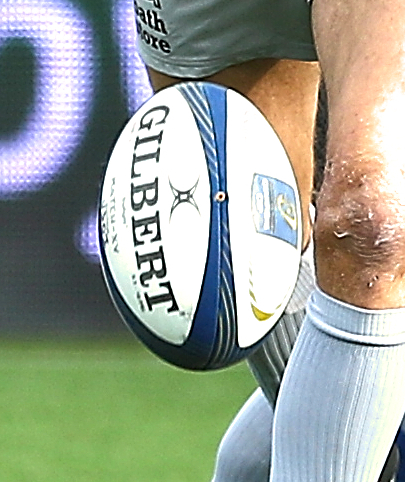
Gilbert ball used in the 2015–16 season

- Webb Ellis – Match balls and officials' kit (2003–2009)
- Adidas – Match balls and officials' kit (2009–2014)
- Canterbury of New Zealand – Match officials' kit (2014–2016)
- Gilbert – Match balls (1998–2002; 2014–) and officials' kit (2016–2019)
- Kappa – Match officials' kit (2019–)
- Tissot – Official watch and timekeeper (2015–)
  - Following their appointment as an official supplier, Tissot began sponsoring the match officials' kit
- DHL – Official logistics partner (2021–)
  - At all matches, the match ball is "delivered" on a DHL-branded plinth.

== Trophy ==
The European Rugby Champions Cup trophy was unveiled in October 2014.

Crafted by Thomas Lyte, the trophy is made of mixed metals including sterling silver and 18ct gold plating. The cup is designed around the idea of the star representing European rugby, including the previous 19 seasons of European rugby, as the Heineken Cup.

The 13.5 kg, five-handled trophy, creates a star shape when viewed from the top, while when viewed from the side, the top of the trophy has a coronet effect, which designers said was to reflect the crowning of the Kings of Europe. The base of the trophy contains the crests of the 10 clubs that won the Heineken Cup, to further reinforce the link between the old and new European competitions

== Media coverage ==
European broadcasters
Territory	Rights holder
Austria	More Than Sports
Baltic states	Viaplay
France	beIN Sports; France Télévisions
Georgia	Rugby TV
Germany	More Than Sports
Ireland	Premier Sports; RTÉ
Italy	Sky Italia; Eleven Sports
Malta	GO
Netherlands	Viaplay
Nordic countries	Viaplay
Poland	Polsat
Portugal	SportTV
Romania	Digi
Spain	Movistar
Switzerland	More Than Sports
United Kingdom	Premier Sports; ITV; S4C (Welsh language)
Other territories	epcrugby.tv

Worldwide broadcasters
Territory	Rights holder
Australia	beIN Sports
Canada	FloSports
Caribbean	SportsMax
Latin America (including Brazil)	ESPN
New Zealand	Sky
Pacific Islands	Digicel
Southeast Asia	Premier Sports
Sub-Saharan Africa (including South Africa)	SuperSport
United States	FloSports
Other territories	epcrugby.tv

Radio partnerships:

- BBC Radio (United Kingdom)
- RTÉ Radio (Ireland)
- Off The Ball/Newstalk (Ireland)

For other territories without official broadcasters, Heineken Champions Cup games are available on EPCR's broadcast platform epcrugby.tv. Between seasons 2014–15 and 2017–18, EPCR was criticised for forcing British and Irish fans to subscribe to two pay-TV companies, both Sky Sports and BT Sport, if they wanted to follow their teams in the tournament.

== Attendance ==
This lists the average attendances for each season's European Cup competition, as well as the total attendance and highest attendance for that season. The final is typically the most-attended match, as it is generally held in a larger stadium than any club's home venue.

The highest attended match of the 2002–03 competition was a quarter-final between Leinster and Biarritz before 46,000 fans at Lansdowne Road in Dublin.

The 2009 final held at Murrayfield Stadium in Edinburgh was only the third most-attended match that season. The most-attended match was a semi-final between Irish rivals Leinster and Munster played in Croke Park in Dublin. The attendance of 82,208 set what was then a world record for a club match in the sport's history and remains the record attendance for any match in the competition's history. Second on that season's list was a pool match between Stade Français and Harlequins that drew 76,569 to Stade de France in Paris (a venue that Stade Français has used for select home matches since 2005). The second highest attendance in the history of the competition was also an Irish derby, but in this case held in Twickenham in London; the 2012 final between Leinster and Ulster.

While the 2010–11 tournament's highest attended match was unsurprisingly the final, the second-highest attended match was notable in that it was held in Spain. Perpignan hosted Toulon in a quarter-final before a sellout crowd of 55,000 at the Olympic Stadium in Barcelona, Spain. On both occasions where the final has been held in Bilbao, Spain, that match has also been the highest attended of that year's competition.

Season	Total	Average	Highest
1995–96	97,535	6,502	21,800
1996–97	317,987	6,765	41,664
1997–98	462,958	6,613	36,500
1998–99	322,340	5,860	49,000
1999–00	626,065	7,924	68,441
2000–01	646,834	8,187	44,000
2001–02	656,382	8,308	74,600
2002–03	704,782	8,921	46,000
2003–04	817,833	10,352	73,057
2004–05	918,039	11,620	51,326
2005–06	964,863	12,370	74,534
2006–07	914,048	11,570	81,076
2007–08	942,373	11,928	74,417
2008–09	1,177,064	14,900	82,208
2009–10	1,080,598	13,678	78,962
2010–11	1,139,427	14,423	72,456
2011–12	1,172,127	14,837	81,774
2012–13	1,063,218	13,458	50,148
2013–14	1,127,926	14,278	67,578
2014–15	985,717	14,712	56,622
2015–16	955,647	14,263	58,017
2016–17	1,018,026	15,194	55,272
2017–18	1,005,537	15,008	52,282
2018–19	1,020,286	15,228	51,930
2019–20*	779,079	12,985	42,041
2020–21*	–	–	10,000
2021–22*	843,371	14,056	59,682
2022–23	1,028,422	16,324	51,711
2023–24	1,160,390	18,419	82,300
2024–25	1,142,553	18,428	70,225
2025–26	1,059,748	16,821	52,327
^{*}Denotes season in which COVID-19 restrictions limited attendance

== Controversies ==
=== Disagreements over structure & governance ===
English and French rugby union clubs had long held concerns over the format and structure of the Heineken Cup organised by European Rugby Cup (ERC), predominantly in relation to the distribution of funds and an imbalance in the qualification process. Some proposals had been made that, in future, rather than Ireland, Wales, Scotland and Italy each sending their top-placed teams in the Pro14 to the Heineken Cup, the top teams from the league as a whole should be sent, regardless of nationality. This founding principle was eventually conceded however, when it was agreed that the top-placed teams from the four should participate in the new European competition.

In June 2012, following that year's final, Premiership Rugby and the Ligue Nationale de Rugby (LNR), on behalf of the English and French clubs respectively, gave ERC two years' notice of withdrawing from the Heineken Cup and also the second-tier Challenge Cup competitions from the start of the 2014–15 season. Soon after, in September, Premiership Rugby announced a new four-year TV deal worth £152 million with BT Sport including rights for English clubs' European games - which had previously been the sole responsibility of ERC. ERC responded with claims that Premiership Rugby did not have the rights to a European tournament and announced a four-year deal with Sky Sports. The actions of Premiership Rugby were said to have "thrown northern hemisphere rugby into disarray".

Subsequently, in September 2013, the English and French clubs announced their intention to organise their own tournament, to be named the Rugby Champions Cup, from 2014 to 2015 season onwards. They invited other European clubs, provinces and regions to join them. The IRB (now World Rugby) stepped into the debate at the same time to announce its opposition to the creation of a breakaway tournament. In October 2013, Regional Rugby Wales, on behalf of the four Welsh regions, confirmed its full support for the proposed new Rugby Champions Cup. Negotiations for both a new Heineken Cup and Rugby Champions Cup were then ongoing.

On 10 April 2014, following almost two years of negotiations, a statement was released under the aegis of European Professional Club Rugby (EPCR) announcing that the nine stakeholders to the new competition, the six unions and three umbrella club organisations (Premiership Rugby, LNR and Regional Rugby Wales), had signed Heads of Agreement for the formation of the European Rugby Champions Cup, the European Rugby Challenge Cup and a new, third tournament, initially called the Qualifying Competition and now known as the European Rugby Continental Shield. On the same day, BT and Sky announced an agreement that divided coverage of the new European competitions. Both will split the pool matches, quarter-finals and semi-finals equally, and both will broadcast the final. BT will get first choice of English Premiership club matches in the Champions Cup, with Sky receiving the same privilege for the Challenge Cup.

Premiership Rugby and LNR were described as having employed "bully-boy tactics" by The Irish Times.

=== Organisation ===
Shortly after the establishment of European Professional Club Rugby (EPCR) to administer the new competition from a new base in Neuchatel, Switzerland, the running of the inaugural 2014–15 tournament was subcontracted to the organisation it had been meant to replace, Dublin-based European Rugby Cup (ERC). This was despite the latter having been described by chairman of Premiership Rugby, Quentin Smith, as "no longer fit for purpose". This was described as "something of an about-turn" by The Daily Telegraph.

EPCR were still looking to hire a permanent chairman and director-general more than a year after their establishment.

=== 2015 final ===
The inaugural Champions Cup final was brought forward by three weeks due to a French desire not to interrupt their domestic playoffs. This was said to have "devalued" and "diminished the status of the occasion as the pinnacle of European club rugby".

While the 2015 Heineken Cup final had been due to take place at the San Siro in Milan, the first European final to take place in Italy, the new organisers decided to move it to Twickenham Stadium in London in order to "guarantee the best possible financial return to clubs". However, with less than two weeks to go before the final took place, it was reported that fewer than half of the stadium's 82,000 seats had been sold, with just 8,000 French supporters travelling to London to watch Toulon face Clermont. The organisers subsequently made "free" tickets available on Ticketmaster (with only a £2 booking fee applicable), before admitting to this being a mistake – the offer supposed to have been linked to a purchase of a Premiership final ticket. This was described as an "embarrassing fiasco" by the Western Mail in Wales. 56,622 fans subsequently attended the game. EPCR were said to have "failed on many levels" by The Irish Times, with the attendance figure for the final "a fitting postscript to the hastily-convened decider to what was, after all the brinkmanship, a hastily-convened tournament".

== See also ==
- List of European Rugby Champions Cup finals
- European Rugby Challenge Cup (Tier 2)
- Rugby Europe Super Cup (Tier 3)
- Premiership (England)
- United Rugby Championship (Ireland, Italy, Scotland, South Africa and Wales)
- Top 14 (France)
- Club World Cup
