= 1998 Heineken Cup final =

1998 Heineken Cup Final
- Event: 1997–98 Heineken Cup
Bath	Brive
(England)	(France)
19	18
- Date: 31 January 1998
- Venue: Stade du Parc Lescure, Bordeaux
- Referee: Jim Fleming (Scotland)
- Attendance: 36,500

The 1998 Heineken Cup Final was the final match of the 1997–98 Heineken Cup, the third season of Europe's top club rugby union competition. The match was played on 31 January 1998 at the Stade du Parc Lescure in Bordeaux. The match was contested by Bath of England and Brive of France. Bath won the match 19–18.

== Match details ==
Bath	Brive

31 January 1998
15:30 CET

Bath (England)	19 – 18	(France) Brive
Try: Callard; Con: Callard; Pen: Callard (4)	Report	Pen: Lamaison (5); Drop: Penaud

Stade du Parc Lescure, Bordeaux
Attendance: 36,500
Referee: Jim Fleming (Scotland)

FB	15	(England) Jonathan Callard
RW	14	(Wales) Ieuan Evans
OC	13	(England) Phil de Glanville
IC	12	(England) Jeremy Guscott
LW	11	(England) Adedayo Adebayo
FH	10	(England) Mike Catt (c)
SH	9	(Scotland) Andy Nichol
N8	8	(United States) Dan Lyle
OF	7	(Wales) Richard Webster
BF	6	(Wales) Nathan Thomas
RL	5	(England) Nigel Redman
LL	4	(England) Martin Haag
TP	3	(England) Victor Ubogu
HK	2	(England) Mark Regan
LP	1	(Scotland) Dave Hilton
Replacements:
	16	(Argentina) Federico Mendez
	17	(England) Russell Earnshaw
	18	(England) Ricky Pellow
	19	(England) John Mallett
	20	(England) Richard Butland
	21	(England) Matt Perry
	22	(Scotland) Eric Peters
Coach:
(England) Andy Robinson

FB	15	(France) Alain Penaud (c)
RW	14	(France) Jérôme Carrat
OC	13	(France) Christophe Lamaison
IC	12	(France) David Venditti
LW	'11	(France) Sébastien Carrat
FH	10	(Argentina) Lisandro Arbizu
SH	9	(France) Philippe Carbonneau
N8	8	(France) François Dubouisset
OF	7	(France) Olivier Magne
BF	6	(France) Loïc van der Linden
RL	5	(France) Yvan Manhes
LL	4	(France) Éric Alégret
TP	3	(France) Richard Crespy
HK	2	(France) Laurent Travers
LP	1	(France) Didier Casadeï
Replacements:
WG	16	(France) Sébastien Viars
LP	17	(France) David Laperne
N8	18	(France) Régis Sonnes
FH	19	(France) Olivier Gouaillard
SH	20	(France) Jean-Charles Vicard
HK	21	(France) Laurent Arbo
LK	22	(France) Lionel Mallier
Coach:
(France) Laurent Seigne

== See also ==
- 1997–98 Heineken Cup
