= 2004 Heineken Cup final =

2004 Heineken Cup Final
- Event: 2003–04 Heineken Cup
London Wasps	Toulouse
(England)	(France)
27	20
- Date: 23 May 2004
- Venue: Twickenham Stadium, London
- Referee: Alain Rolland (Ireland)
- Attendance: 73,057

The 2004 Heineken Cup Final was the final match of the 2003–04 Heineken Cup, the ninth season of Europe's top club rugby union competition. The match was played on 23 May 2004 at Twickenham Stadium in London. The match was contested by London Wasps of England and Toulouse of France. Wasps won the match 27–20.

== Match details ==
23 May 2004
15:00 BST

London Wasps (England)	27 – 20	(France) Toulouse
Tries: Abbott 19' c Van Gisbergen 43' c Howley 79' c Con: Van Gisbergen (3); Pen: Van Gisbergen (2) 15', 31'	Report	Try: Delaigue 38' m Pen: Delaigue (2) 6', 12'; Élissalde (3) 57', 72', 77'

Twickenham Stadium, London
Attendance: 73,057
Referee: Alain Rolland (Ireland)

FB	15	(New Zealand) Mark van Gisbergen
RW	14	(England) Josh Lewsey
OC	13	(England) Fraser Waters
IC	12	(England) Stuart Abbott
LW	11	(England) Tom Voyce
FH	10	(England) Alex King
SH	9	(Wales) Rob Howley
N8	8	(England) Lawrence Dallaglio (c)
OF	7	(England) Paul Volley
BF	6	(England) Joe Worsley
RL	5	(England) Richard Birkett
LL	4	(England) Simon Shaw
TP	3	(England) Will Green
HK	2	(Samoa) Trevor Leota
LP	1	(England) Tim Payne
Substitutions:
HK	16	(England) Henry Nwume
PR	17	(England) Mark Lock
FL	18	(England) Ben Gotting
LK	19	(England) Martin Purdy
SH	20	(England) Peter Richards
WG	21	(England) Mark Denney
CE	22	(England) Ayoola Erinle
Coach:
(New Zealand) Warren Gatland

FB	15	(France) Clément Poitrenaud
RW	14	(France) Émile Ntamack
OC	13	(France) Yannick Jauzion
IC	12	(France) Cédric Desbrosse
LW	11	(France) Cédric Heymans
FH	10	(France) Yann Delaigue
SH	9	(France) Frédéric Michalak
N8	8	(France) Christian Labit
OF	7	(France) Jean Bouilhou
BF	6	(Tonga) Finau Maka
RL	5	(Ireland) Trevor Brennan
LL	4	(France) Fabien Pelous	(c)
TP	3	(France) Jean-Baptiste Poux
HK	2	(France) William Servat
LP	1	(France) Patrice Collazo
Substitutions:
PR	16	(France) Julian Fiorini
HK	17	(France) Yannick Bru
LK	18	(France) David Gérard
FL	19	(Tonga) Isitolo Maka
SH	20	(France) Jean-Baptiste Élissalde
WG	21	(France) Vincent Clerc
LK	22	(France) Romain Millo-Chluski
Coach:
(France) Guy Novès

== See also ==
- 2003–04 Heineken Cup
