= Mark Denney =

- Born: 25 January 1975 (age 51) Epping Forest, England
- Height: 1.83 m (6 ft 0 in)
- Weight: 110 kg (17 st 5 lb)
- School: Bedford Modern
- University: Bristol University, Cambridge University

Rugby union career
- Position: Centre
Amateur team(s)
Years	Team	Apps	(Points)
1992–93	Bedford	2	(0)
Senior career
Years	Team	Apps	(Points)
1993–1998	Bristol	45	(20)
1998–2004	London Wasps	165	(105)
2004–2005	Castres		(36)
2005–2006	Olney RFC	13	(0)
International career
Years	Team	Apps	(Points)
- England Saxons

Mark Denney (born 25 January 1975) is a former rugby union footballer who played at centre for Bedford, Bristol, Castres, Wasps and Cambridge University. Whilst at Wasps he helped them win the Tetley Bitter Cup Final in 1999 and 2000; scoring a try in the latter final. He was a member of the Wasps team that won the 2002–03 Premiership Final, the 2003–04 Premiership Final and the 2004 Heineken Cup Final. He was educated at Bedford Modern School, Bristol University and Cambridge University. In 2015 (Aged 40) he spent a season, with his mates, playing for the all conquering Olney Vets RFC in the inaugural East Midlands Vets League Final.

Denney was called up to the senior England squad for the 2000 Six Nations Championship.
