= Matt Perry =

British Lions & England international rugby union player

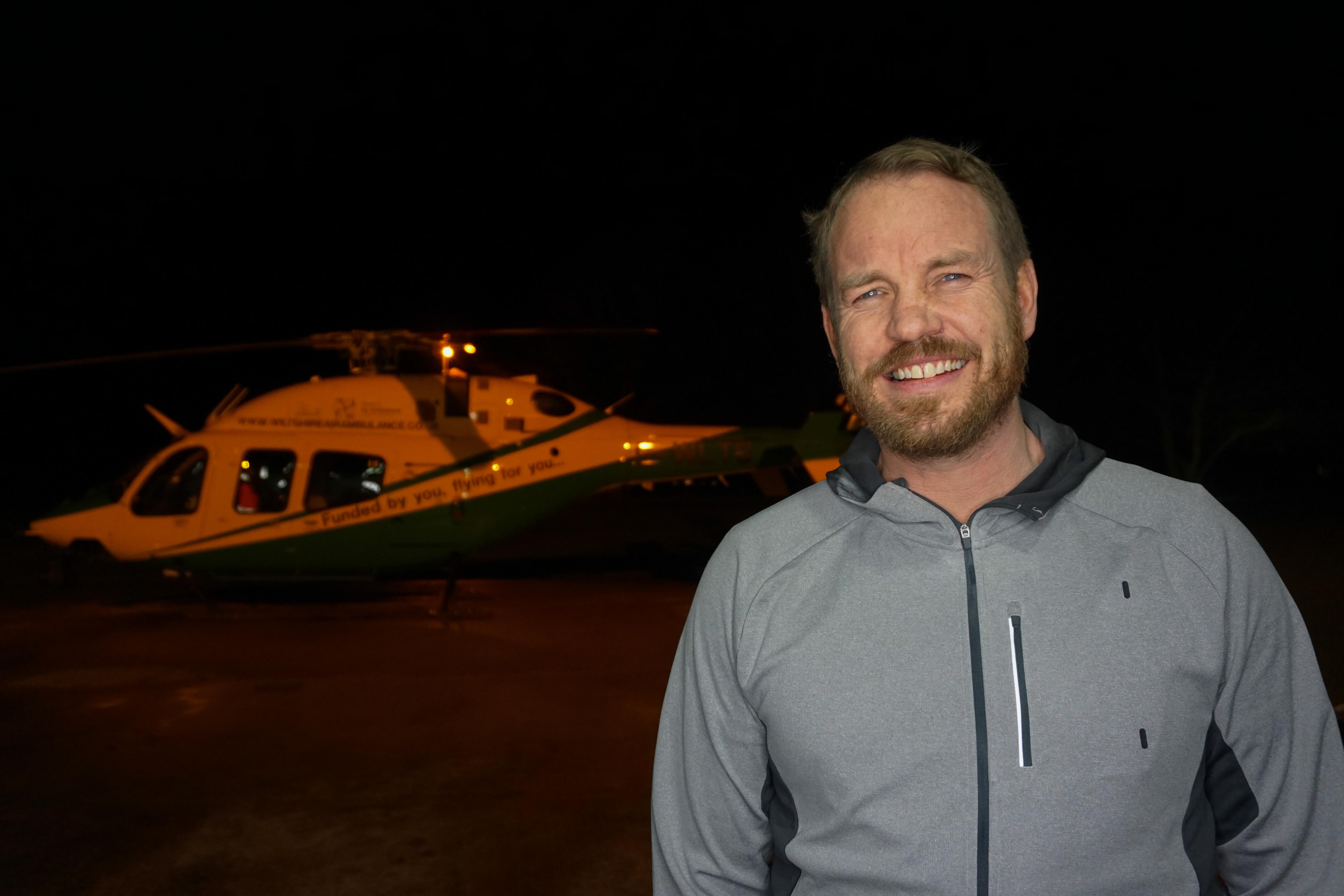
- Matt Perry and Wiltshire Air Ambulance
- Born: Matthew Brendan Perry; 27 January 1977 (age 49) Bath, Somerset, England
- Height: 6 ft 1 in (1.85 m)
- Weight: 13 st 12 lb (88 kg)
- School: Millfield School

Rugby union career
- Position: Full Back
Senior career
Years	Team	Apps	(Points)
1997–2006	Bath	221	(561)
International career
Years	Team	Apps	(Points)
1997–2001	England	36	(50)
2001	Lions	3	(0)

Matthew Brendan Perry (born 27 January 1977 in Bath, Somerset) is an English former rugby union player who played fullback for Bath. He played internationally for England and the British & Irish Lions.

== Youth and early career ==
A cricketer, at Millfield School Perry captained a side including Ben Hollioake, later an England international. He made his debut for Bath's first team towards the end of the amateur era in December 1995. Perry went to South Africa to play for the Durban Crusaders' under-21 side for four months in 1996. This caused him to give up a place at University College, Cardiff. On returning to the UK, Perry rejoined Bath. He played 221 times for the club before retiring in 2007. He played in eight of Bath's nine matches in their winning 1997–98 Heineken Cup campaign, being omitted only from the final against Brive in Bordeaux in favour of Jon Callard, where he was named as a replacement.

== England rugby ==
England coach Clive Woodward, selected Perry for his first match in charge against Australia in the autumn 1997. Perry was awarded Man of the Match on his debut. In the Rugby Football Union's 1997/98 awards, Perry was recognised as the young player of the year.

In 1998, Perry went on England's "Tour to Hell" of Australia, New Zealand and South Africa. During the 76–0 defeat by Australia, he played out of position at centre. He was part of England's squad for the 1999 Rugby World Cup.

Aged 23, Perry beat Jonathan Webb's record to become England's most capped full back with 35 caps in the position, a record that has since been overtaken by Mike Brown. He went on to score 10 tries for England. A back injury saw him dropped from the England squad for Iain Balshaw; he later made way for both Jason Robinson and Josh Lewsey. Perry made his last appearance for the England senior team in 2001 when he played against France. Perry subsequently went on the 2001 British & Irish Lions tour to Australia, playing in all three tests.

== Later career ==
Perry continued to play for Bath after his final England appearance, but was plagued by injuries. He was forced to withdraw from the 2004 Zurich Premiership final due to a calf strain sustained in the pre-match warm-up.

== Retirement ==
A bulging disc in Perry's back resulted in spasms and sciatic damage in his left leg, and he retired from playing rugby on 27 March 2007. On ending his rugby career, he was reported to be joining a consultancy company. He is the founder and director of the company Transition 15.

== Family ==
Perry's father Brendan and grandfather Idris also played for Bath. One of Perry's grandmothers was from the town of Ballyhaunis in County Mayo, Ireland. He has two sons.

== Charitable support ==
Perry is the ambassador of Wiltshire and Bath Air Ambulance Charity.
