= Mark van Gisbergen =

England international rugby union player

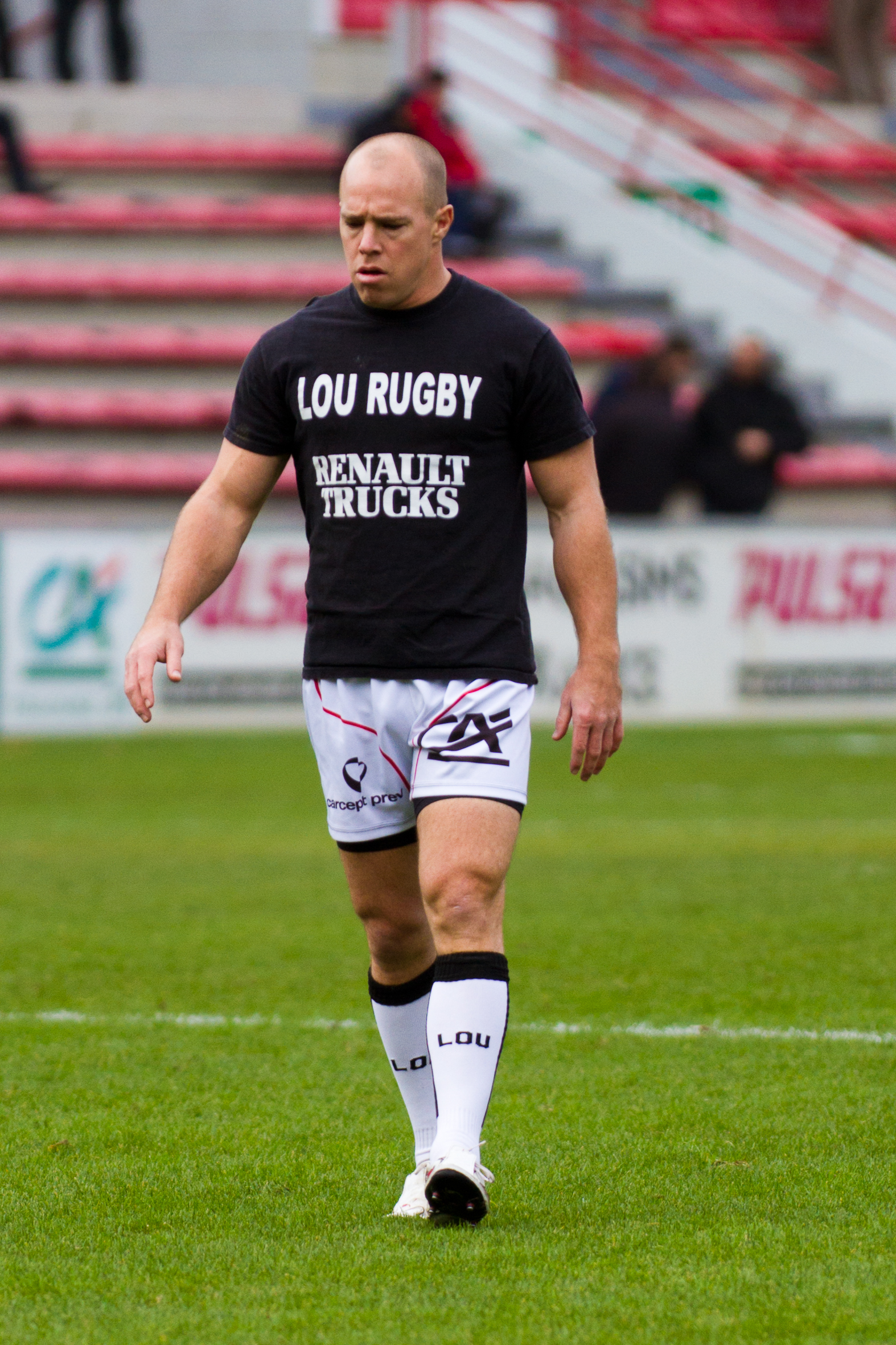
- Born: Mark van Gisbergen; 30 June 1977 (age 49) Hamilton, New Zealand
- Height: 1.73 m (5 ft 8 in)
- Weight: 88 kg (13 st 12 lb)
- School: St John's College

Rugby union career
- Position: Full-back / Fly-half
Youth career
- Hamilton Marist
Senior career
Years	Team	Apps	(Points)
1997–2002	Waikato		
2002–2011	London Wasps	193	(1166)
2011-2012	Lyon OU		
International career
Years	Team	Apps	(Points)
2005	England	1	(0)

Mark van Gisbergen (born 30 June 1977 in Hamilton, New Zealand) is a rugby union footballer who plays at fullback for Lyon and England. He is nicknamed 'Giz' or 'Gizzy'.

Van Gisbergen's father is Dutch born whilst his mother is from New Zealand, meaning that the player holds both a New Zealand passport and a Netherlands passport. Van Gisbergen qualified to play for England on 11 September 2005 on residency grounds, having come to England three years previously to begin his playing career at Wasps.

He is a former Waikato fly-half in the National Provincial Championship, although he was unable to cement a regular starting position or secure a more financially rewarding Super 12 contract. He played his club rugby for Hamilton Marist for several seasons, often at fullback.

The fullback made his debut for Wasps in 2002 and scored just under 300 points for his club in the 2003-04 Zurich Premiership and the 2003-04 Heineken Cup. He scored over 300 points in the 2004-05 Zurich Premiership and the 2004-05 Heineken Cup and appeared in all but two Wasps matches. In his time with Wasps he played in four victorious Premiership Finals in 2003, 2004, 2005 and 2008. In the 2004 final he scored a conversion, but in the 2005 final he was more pivotal and scored a try, three conversions and five penalties. Then in 2008 he scored two conversions and four penalties. He also played in two Heineken Cup Finals in 2004 and 2007. In 2004 he scored a try, three conversions and two penalties. In 2007 he was a replacement.

He made his Test debut as a brief replacement for Mark Cueto during England's 26–16 defeat of Australia in November 2005. In a friendly before the 2006-07 Guinness Premiership he suffered a broken chin, and was ruled out for six weeks. He was picked in the 2007 Six Nations Championship Squad.
