= David Laperne =

French rugby union player (born 1972)

- Born: 13 September 1972 (age 54) Oloron, France
- Height: 6 ft 0 in (183 cm)
- Weight: 226 lb (103 kg)

Rugby union career
- Position: Prop
International career
Years	Team	Apps	(Points)
1997	France	1	(0)

David Laperne (born 13 September 1972) is a French former rugby union international.

Born in Oloron, Pyrénées-Atlantiques, Laperne was capped once by France as a replacement prop in a win over Romania at Bucharest's Dinamo Stadium in 1997. He played his rugby for CA Brive during this time and featured in the club's one-point loss to Bath in the 1998 Heineken Cup final.

Laperne is the town of Oloron's first ever municipal police officer, following his appointment to the post in 2017.

== See also ==
- List of France national rugby union players
