= 1997–98 Heineken Cup =

International rugby union competition

1997–1998 Heineken Cup

Tournament details
- Countries: England; France; Ireland; Italy; Scotland; Wales
- Tournament format(s): Round-robin and Knockout
- Date: October 1997 to 31 January 1998

Tournament statistics
- Teams: 20
- Matches played: 70
- Attendance: 462,958 (6,614 per match)
- Top point scorer(s): Lee Jarvis (Cardiff) (134 points)
- Top try scorer(s): Kenny Logan (Wasps) (7 tries)

Final
- Venue: Stade Lescure, Bordeaux
- Attendance: 36,500
- Champions: (England) Bath (1st title)
- Runners-up: (France) Brive

The 1997–98 Heineken Cup was the third edition of the Heineken Cup European rugby union club competition. Competing professional club teams from France, Ireland, Italy, Wales, England and Scotland, were divided into five pools of four, in which teams played home and away matches against each other. The pool winners automatically qualified for the knock-out stages. The five runners-up and the best third placed team entered the play-offs, where they competed for the remaining three quarter final positions.

== Teams ==
England	Ireland	Italy	France	Scotland	Wales
Leicester Tigers; London Wasps; Bath; Harlequins	Leinster; Munster; Ulster	Treviso; Rugby Milano	Toulouse; Brive; Pau; Bourgoin	Glasgow; Borders; Caledonia	Swansea; Pontypridd; Llanelli; Cardiff

== Pool stage ==
In the pool matches teams received

- 2 points for a win
- 1 points for a draw

Key to colours
Winner of each pool advances to quarter-final stage
Advance to quarter-final playoffs

=== Pool 1 ===
Team	P	W	D	L	Tries for	Tries against	Try diff	Points for	Points against	Points diff	Pts
(France) Toulouse	6	5	0	1	25	12	13	200	121	79	10
(England) Leicester	6	4	0	2	16	14	2	163	117	46	8
(Ireland) Leinster	6	2	0	4	15	19	−4	137	167	−30	4
(Italy) Milan	6	1	0	5	15	26	−11	111	206	−95	2

=== Pool 2 ===
Team	P	W	D	L	Tries for	Tries against	Try diff	Points for	Points against	Points diff	Pts
(England) Wasps	6	6	0	0	31	12	19	243	104	139	12
(Scotland) Glasgow	6	3	0	3	14	15	−1	132	167	−35	6
(Wales) Swansea	6	2	0	4	15	16	−1	157	161	−4	4
(Ireland) Ulster	6	1	0	5	6	23	−17	95	195	−100	2

=== Pool 3 ===
Team	P	W	D	L	Tries for	Tries against	Try diff	Points for	Points against	Points diff	Pts
(England) Bath	6	5	0	1	12	12	0	141	119	22	10
(France) Brive	6	4	1	1	24	13	11	210	146	64	9
(Wales) Pontypridd	6	2	1	3	17	13	4	154	147	7	5
(Scotland) Scottish Borders	6	0	0	6	14	29	−15	129	222	−93	0

=== Pool 4 ===
Team	P	W	D	L	Tries for	Tries against	Try diff	Points for	Points against	Points diff	Pts
(England) Harlequins	6	4	0	2	21	12	9	198	141	57	8
(Wales) Cardiff	6	4	0	2	17	15	2	184	146	38	8
(France) Bourgoin	6	2	0	4	14	21	−7	141	180	−39	4
(Ireland) Munster	6	2	0	4	7	11	−4	93	149	−56	4

=== Pool 5 ===
Team	P	W	D	L	Tries for	Tries against	Try diff	Points for	Points against	Points diff	Pts
(France) Pau	6	4	0	2	27	8	19	203	89	114	8
(Wales) Llanelli	6	4	0	2	15	18	−3	144	142	2	8
(Italy) Benetton Treviso	6	2	0	4	18	19	−1	146	162	−16	4
(Scotland) Caledonia	6	2	0	4	8	23	−15	89	189	−100	4

== Seeding ==
Seed	Pool Winners	Pts	TF	+/−
1	(England) London Wasps	12	31	+139
2	(France) Toulouse	10	25	+79
3	(England) Bath	10	12	+22
4	(France) Pau	8	27	+114
5	(England) Harlequins	8	21	+57
Seed	Pool Runners-up (and best third place)	Pts	TF	+/−
6	(France) Brive	9	24	+64
7	(Wales) Cardiff	8	17	+38
8	(England) Leicester Tigers	8	16	+46
9	(Wales) Llanelli	8	15	+2
10	(Scotland) Glasgow	6	14	−35
11	(Wales) Pontypridd	5	17	+7

== Knockout stage ==
=== Quarter-final play-offs ===
1 November 1997
15:00

Leicester Tigers (England)	90 – 19	(Scotland) Glasgow

Welford Road
Attendance: 6,500

1 November 1997
16:30

Brive (France)	25 – 20	(Wales) Pontypridd

Parc Municipal des Sports
Attendance: 13,000

1 November 1997
17:15

Cardiff (Wales)	24 – 20	(Wales) Llanelli

Cardiff Arms Park
Attendance: 8,000

=== Quarter-finals ===
8 November 1997
14:15

Bath (England)	32 – 21	(Wales) Cardiff

Recreation Ground
Attendance: 8,200

8 November 1997
15:30

Toulouse (France)	51 – 10	(England) Harlequins

Stade Municipal
Attendance: 18,000

9 November 1997
14:15

London Wasps (England)	18 – 25	(France) Brive

Loftus Road Stadium
Attendance: 10,481

9 November 1997
15:20

Pau (France)	35 – 18	(England) Leicester Tigers

Stade Municipal du Hameau
Attendance: 12,000

=== Semi-finals ===
20 December 1997
14:00

Bath (England)	20 – 14	(France) Pau

Recreation Ground
Attendance: 8,200

21 December 1997
15:20

Toulouse (France)	22 – 22	(France) Brive

Stade Municipal
Attendance: 26,000

Brive advance to final on try count (two tries to one)

=== Final ===
31 January 1998
15:30

Bath (England)	19 – 18	(France) Brive
Try: Callard; Con: Callard; Pen: Callard (4)	Report	Pen: Lamaison (5); Drop: Penaud

Stade du Parc Lescure, Bordeaux
Attendance: 36,500
Referee: Jim Fleming (Scotland)
