= 2003–04 Premiership Rugby =

Rugby union competition in England

2003-2004 Zurich Premiership
- Countries: England
- Champions: London Wasps (4th title)
- Runners-up: Bath
- Relegated: Rotherham Titans
- Matches played: 137
- Attendance: 1,241,557 (average 9,062 per match)

The 2003-04 Zurich Premiership was the 17th season of the top flight of the English domestic rugby union competitions.

Rotherham were relegated after failing to win a single match all season.

== Participating teams ==
Locations of the 2003-04 Zurich Premiership teams

Team	Stadium	Capacity	City/Area
Bath	Recreation Ground	9,980	Bath, Somerset
Gloucester	Kingsholm	11,000	Gloucester, Gloucestershire
Harlequins	The Stoop	9,000 (2,000 seats)	Twickenham, London
Leeds Tykes	Headingley Stadium	22,250	Leeds, West Yorkshire
Leicester Tigers	Welford Road	16,815	Leicester, Leicestershire
London Irish	Madejski Stadium	24,161	Reading, Berkshire
London Wasps	The Causeway Stadium	10,000	High Wycombe, Buckinghamshire
Newcastle Falcons	Kingston Park	10,001 (Note: Continued ground improvements brought Kingston Park's capacity up from 9,800 to 10,001 for the 2003–04 season.)	Newcastle upon Tyne, Tyne and Wear
Northampton Saints	Franklin's Gardens	12,100	Northampton, Northamptonshire
Rotherham Titans	Millmoor	11,158	Rotherham, South Yorkshire
Sale Sharks	Edgeley Park	10,641 (Note: Due to capacity limitations Sale Sharks moved from Heywood Road to Edgeley Park for the 2003–04 season.)	Stockport, Greater Manchester
Saracens	Vicarage Road	22,000	Watford, Hertfordshire

== Table ==
Pos	Team	Pld	W	D	L	PF	PA	PD	TF	TA	TB	LB	Pts	Qualification
1	Bath	22	18	0	4	508	311	+197	45	24	4	3	79	Playoff place
2	London Wasps (C)	22	16	0	6	575	406	+169	59	37	6	3	73	Playoff place
3	Northampton Saints	22	15	1	6	574	416	+158	61	48	6	2	70	Playoff place
4	Gloucester	22	14	0	8	491	412	+79	51	41	4	3	63	2004–05 Heineken Cup
5	Leicester Tigers	22	11	3	8	537	430	+107	53	37	4	2	55 (Note: Leicester and Saracens deducted one point each for fielding an ineligible player.)	2004–05 Heineken Cup
6	Harlequins	22	10	2	10	502	449	+53	50	43	4	6	54	2004–05 Heineken Cup
7	Sale Sharks	22	9	3	10	510	472	+38	56	50	5	6	53	
8	London Irish	22	10	1	11	427	454	−27	30	37	1	6	49	
9	Newcastle Falcons	22	7	2	13	497	525	−28	53	55	4	9	45	2004–05 Heineken Cup
10	Saracens	22	8	1	13	397	543	−146	40	56	3	3	39	
11	Leeds Tykes	22	7	1	14	449	588	−139	47	59	4	3	37	
12	Rotherham Titans (R)	22	0	0	22	309	770	−461	32	90	0	3	3	Relegation place

Source: Guinness Premiership

== Results ==
=== Week 1 ===
12 September 2003
19:45

Sale Sharks	37 – 37	Northampton Saints

Edgeley Park
Attendance: 8,105

13 September 2003
14:45

Harlequins	33 – 27	London Wasps

Twickenham Stoop
Attendance: 7,223

13 September 2003
15:00

Gloucester	22 – 8	Rotherham Titans

Kingsholm
Attendance: 10,114

13 September 2003
15:00

Leicester Tigers	29 – 19	London Irish

Welford Road
Attendance: 16,029

14 September 2003
14:30

Leeds Tykes	32 – 44	Bath

Headingley
Attendance: 4,093

14 September 2003
15:00

Newcastle Falcons	20 – 25	Saracens

Kingston Park
Attendance: 7,012

=== Week 2 ===
20 September 2003
14:15

Bath	24 – 6	Northampton Saints

Recreation Ground
Attendance: 9,381

20 September 2003
14:45

Rotherham Titans	15 – 43	Harlequins

Millmoor
Attendance: 4,003

21 September 2003
15:00

London Irish	16 – 10	Gloucester

Madejski Stadium
Attendance: 9,968

21 September 2003
15:00

London Wasps	33 – 10	Leeds Tykes

The Causeway Stadium
Attendance: 5,721

21 September 2003
15:00

Newcastle Falcons	9 – 8	Sale Sharks

Kingston Park
Attendance: 5,628

21 September 2003
15:00

Saracens	19 – 19	Leicester Tigers

Vicarage Road
Attendance: 7,730

=== Week 3 ===
26 September 2003
19:45

Leicester Tigers	28 – 21	Newcastle Falcons

Welford Road
Attendance: 16,815

26 September 2003
19:45

Sale Sharks	9 – 14	Bath

Edgeley Park
Attendance: 6,500

26 September 2003
20:00

Leeds Tykes	23 – 13	Rotherham Titans

Headingley
Attendance: 4,842

27 September 2003
14:45

Gloucester	30 – 7	Saracens

Kingsholm
Attendance: 10,050

27 September 2003
15:00

Harlequins	15 – 10	London Irish

Twickenham Stoop
Attendance: 7,523

27 September 2003
15:00

Northampton Saints	27 – 17	London Wasps

Franklin’s Gardens
Attendance: 10,571

=== Week 4 ===
4 October 2003
14:45

Leicester Tigers	16 – 22	Sale Sharks

Welford Road
Attendance: 15,507

4 October 2003
15:00

Rotherham Titans	13 – 42	Northampton Saints

Millmoor
Attendance: 3,118

5 October 2003
14:00

London Wasps	19 – 20	Bath

The Causeway Stadium
Attendance: 7,767

5 October 2003
15:00

London Irish	31 – 16	Leeds Tykes

Madejski Stadium
Attendance: 5,725

5 October 2003
15:00

Newcastle Falcons	42 – 22	Gloucester

Kingston Park
Attendance: 6,102

5 October 2003
15:00

Saracens	39 – 33	Harlequins

Vicarage Road
Attendance: 6,380

=== Week 5 ===
10 October 2003
19:45

Sale Sharks	33 – 37	London Wasps

Edgeley Park
Attendance: 5,803

11 October 2003
14:15

Bath	47 – 3	Rotherham Titans

Recreation Ground
Attendance: 8,733

11 October 2003
14:45

Gloucester	24 – 3	Leicester Tigers

Kingsholm
Attendance: 11,000

11 October 2003
15:00

Harlequins	18 – 11	Newcastle Falcons

Twickenham Stoop
Attendance: 6,523

11 October 2003
15:00

Northampton Saints	24 – 30	London Irish

Franklin’s Gardens
Attendance: 10,384

12 October 2003
15:00

Leeds Tykes	41 – 31	Saracens

Headingley
Attendance: 2,888

=== Week 6 ===
17 October 2003
19:45

Rotherham Titans	14 – 28	Sale Sharks

Millmoor
Attendance: 2,229

18 October 2003
15:30

Harlequins	0 – 16	Gloucester

Twickenham Stoop
Attendance: 6,223

18 October 2003
16:00

Northampton Saints	33 – 20	Newcastle Falcons

Franklin’s Gardens
Attendance: 9,923

19 October 2003
14:00

Bath	25 – 3	Saracens

Recreation Ground
Attendance: 9,154

19 October 2003
14:30

Leeds Tykes	39 – 18	Leicester Tigers

Headingley
Attendance: 4,073

19 October 2003
15:00

London Wasps	22 – 15	London Irish

The Causeway Stadium
Attendance: 6,463

=== Week 7 ===
25 October 2003
14:45

Newcastle Falcons	19 – 17	Bath

Kingston Park
Attendance: 4,885

25 October 2003
15:00

Gloucester	24 – 19	Leeds Tykes

Kingsholm
Attendance: 9,832

25 October 2003
15:00

Leicester Tigers	15 – 32	Northampton Saints

Welford Road
Attendance: 16,815

25 October 2003
15:00

Harlequins	21 – 30	Sale Sharks

Twickenham Stoop
Attendance: 5,123

26 October 2003
15:00

London Irish	47 – 26	Rotherham Titans

Madejski Stadium
Attendance: 5,831

26 October 2003
15:00

Saracens	3 – 42	London Wasps

Vicarage Road
Attendance: 6,950

=== Week 8 ===
31 October 2003
19:45

Sale Sharks	26 – 28	London Irish

Edgeley Park
Attendance: 5,605

31 October 2003
20:00

Leeds Tykes	16 – 30	Harlequins

Headingley
Attendance: 3,205

1 November 2003
14:15

Bath	31 – 17	Leicester Tigers

Recreation Ground
Attendance: 9,980

1 November 2003
14:45

Northampton Saints	30 – 17	Gloucester

Franklin’s Gardens
Attendance: 11,026

1 November 2003
15:00

Rotherham Titans	12 – 25	Saracens

Millmoor
Attendance: 2,500

2 November 2003
15:00

London Wasps	30 – 26	Newcastle Falcons

The Causeway Stadium
Attendance: 5,151

=== Week 9 ===
8 November 2003
14:45

Sale Sharks	37 – 21	Leeds Tykes

Edgeley Park
Attendance: 3,367

8 November 2003
15:00

Gloucester	14 – 20	Bath

Kingsholm
Attendance: 11,000

8 November 2003
15:00

Leicester Tigers	32 – 22	London Wasps

Welford Road
Attendance: 15,384

8 November 2003
15:00

Harlequins	43 – 21	Northampton Saints

Twickenham Stoop
Attendance: 6,223

9 November 2003
15:00

Newcastle Falcons	56 – 10	Rotherham Titans

Kingston Park
Attendance: 5,452

9 November 2003
15:00

Saracens	31 – 34	London Irish

Vicarage Road
Attendance: 5,013

=== Week 10 ===
21 November 2003
19:45

London Wasps	20 – 12	Gloucester

The Causeway Stadium
Attendance: 7,288

21 November 2003
19:45

Sale Sharks	33 – 3	Saracens

Edgeley Park
Attendance: 5,487

22 November 2003
14:15

Bath	18 – 10	Harlequins

Recreation Ground
Attendance: 9,980

22 November 2003
15:00

Northampton Saints	48 – 24	Leeds Tykes

Franklin’s Gardens
Attendance: 11,292

22 November 2003
16:00

Rotherham Titans	17 – 27	Leicester Tigers

Millmoor
Attendance: 2,900

23 November 2003
15:00

London Irish	15 – 19	Newcastle Falcons

Madejski Stadium
Attendance: 6,791

=== Week 11 ===
29 November 2003
14:45

Newcastle Falcons	20 – 23	London Wasps

Kingston Park
Attendance: 10,001

29 November 2003
15:00

Gloucester	28 – 20	Northampton Saints

Kingsholm
Attendance: 11,000

29 November 2003
15:00

Leicester Tigers	12 – 13	Bath

Welford Road
Attendance: 16,815

29 November 2003
15:00

Harlequins	9 – 16	Leeds Tykes

Twickenham Stoop
Attendance: 7,123

30 November 2003
15:00

London Irish	9 – 3	Sale Sharks

Madejski Stadium
Attendance: 7,488

30 November 2003
15:00

Saracens	29 – 10	Rotherham Titans

Vicarage Road
Attendance: 5,680

=== Week 12 ===
19 December 2003
19:45

Sale Sharks	27 – 27	Harlequins

Edgeley Park
Attendance: 6,643

20 December 2003
13:00

Rotherham Titans	10 – 15	London Irish

Millmoor
Attendance: 1,910

20 December 2003
14:15

Bath	20 – 10	Newcastle Falcons

Recreation Ground
Attendance: 9,800

20 December 2003
14:45

Northampton Saints	14 – 0	Leicester Tigers

Franklin’s Gardens
Attendance: 12,150

21 December 2003
14:30

Leeds Tykes	22 – 18	Gloucester

Headingley
Attendance: 7,467

21 December 2003
15:00

London Wasps	41 – 0	Saracens

The Causeway Stadium
Attendance: 9,350

=== Week 13 ===
27 December 2003
15:00

Gloucester	18 – 17	Harlequins

Kingsholm
Attendance: 11,000

27 December 2003
15:00

Leicester Tigers	39 – 11	Leeds Tykes

Welford Road
Attendance: 16,815

27 December 2003
15:00

Sale Sharks	35 – 7	Rotherham Titans

Edgeley Park
Attendance: 8,797

27 December 2003
15:00

Saracens	15 – 24	Bath

Vicarage Road
Attendance: 11,477

27 December 2003
15:15

London Irish	19 – 34	London Wasps

Madejski Stadium
Attendance: 20,318

28 December 2003
14:30

Newcastle Falcons	23 – 19	Northampton Saints

Kingston Park
Attendance: 10,000

=== Week 14 ===
1 January 2004
15:00

Saracens	27 – 3	Leeds Tykes

Vicarage Road
Attendance: 9,350

3 January 2004
14:45

Leicester Tigers	18 – 28	Gloucester

Welford Road
Attendance: 16,815

4 January 2004
14:30

Newcastle Falcons	25 – 29	Harlequins

Kingston Park
Attendance: 7,975

4 January 2004
15:00

London Irish	15 – 36	Northampton Saints

Madejski Stadium
Attendance: 10,004

4 January 2004
15:00

London Wasps	26 – 10	Sale Sharks

The Causeway Stadium
Attendance: 9,506

4 January 2004
15:00

Rotherham Titans	18 – 34	Bath

Millmoor
Attendance: 6,894

=== Week 15 ===
6 February 2004
19:45

Sale Sharks	3 – 3	Leicester Tigers

Edgeley Park
Attendance: 10,541

6 February 2004
20:00

Leeds Tykes	9 – 16	London Irish

Headingley
Attendance: 3,230

7 February 2004
14:40

Bath	6 – 10	London Wasps

Recreation Ground
Attendance: 9,980

7 February 2004
15:00

Gloucester	36 – 12	Newcastle Falcons

Kingsholm
Attendance: 11,000

7 February 2004
15:00

Harlequins	12 – 10	Saracens

Twickenham Stoop
Attendance: 8,170

7 February 2004
15:00

Northampton Saints	18 – 8	Rotherham Titans

Franklin’s Gardens
Attendance: 10,839

=== Week 16 ===
14 February 2004
15:00

Rotherham Titans	20 – 27	London Wasps

Millmoor
Attendance: 2,200

14 February 2004
18:00

Gloucester	38 – 12	Sale Sharks

Kingsholm
Attendance: 10,993

15 February 2004
13:00

Saracens	18 – 22	Northampton Saints

Vicarage Road
Attendance: 5,651

15 February 2004
13:30

Newcastle Falcons	25 – 28	Leeds Tykes

Kingston Park
Attendance: 7,503

=== Week 17 ===
21 February 2004
14:15

Bath	22 – 13	Leeds Tykes

Recreation Ground
Attendance: 9,818

21 February 2004
14:30

London Irish	9 – 22	Leicester Tigers

Madejski Stadium
Attendance: 10,836

21 February 2004
15:00

Northampton Saints	51 – 12	Sale Sharks

Franklin’s Gardens
Attendance: 11,756

22 February 2004
15:00

Rotherham Titans	21 – 35	Gloucester

Millmoor
Attendance: 2,250

22 February 2004
15:00

Saracens	32 – 27	Newcastle Falcons

Vicarage Road
Attendance: 7,516

22 February 2004
18:00

London Wasps	22 – 21	Harlequins

The Causeway Stadium
Attendance: 8,549

=== Week 18 ===
19 March 2004
19:45

Leicester Tigers	30 – 21	Harlequins

Welford Road
Attendance: 16,815

21 March 2004
15:00

London Irish	20 – 21	Bath

Madejski Stadium
Attendance: 20,840

=== Week 19 ===
26 March 2004
19:45

Sale Sharks	38 – 20	Gloucester

Edgeley Park
Attendance: 6,487

27 March 2004
14:15

Bath	23 – 21	London Irish

Recreation Ground
Attendance: 9,980

27 March 2004
15:00

Harlequins	20 – 23	Leicester Tigers

Twickenham Stoop
Attendance: 7,871

27 March 2004
15:00

Northampton Saints	24 – 3	Saracens

Franklin’s Gardens
Attendance: 12,003

28 March 2004
14:30

Leeds Tykes	30 – 30	Newcastle Falcons

Headingley
Attendance: 4,907

28 March 2004
15:00

London Wasps	39 – 11	Rotherham Titans

The Causeway Stadium
Attendance: 6,757

=== Week 20 ===
2 April 2004
19:45

Rotherham Titans	20 – 34	Leeds Tykes

Millmoor
Attendance: 2,750

3 April 2004
14:15

Bath	16 – 12	Sale Sharks

Recreation Ground
Attendance: 9,980

3 April 2004
14:45

Saracens	8 – 16	Gloucester

Vicarage Road
Attendance: 6,907

4 April 2004
15:00

London Irish	15 – 15	Harlequins

Madejski Stadium
Attendance: 9,574

4 April 2004
15:00

London Wasps	31 – 5	Northampton Saints

The Causeway Stadium
Attendance: 10,000

4 April 2004
15:00

Newcastle Falcons	25 – 25	Leicester Tigers

Kingston Park
Attendance: 10,000

=== Week 21 ===
16 April 2004
19:45

Leicester Tigers	38 – 10	Saracens

Welford Road
Attendance: 16,815

16 April 2004
19:45

Harlequins	43 – 20	Rotherham Titans

Twickenham Stoop
Attendance: 4,758

18 April 2004
14:00

Northampton Saints	16 – 6	Bath

Franklin’s Gardens
Attendance: 12,005

18 April 2004
14:30

Leeds Tykes	7 – 11	London Wasps

Headingley
Attendance: 3,194

18 April 2004
16:00

Gloucester	28 – 13	London Irish

Kingsholm
Attendance: 11,000

=== Week 22 ===
23 April 2004
19:45

Sale Sharks	41 – 16	Newcastle Falcons

Edgeley Park
Attendance: 9,486

=== Week 23 ===
1 May 2004
14:45

Gloucester	28 – 25	London Wasps

Kingsholm
Attendance: 11,000

1 May 2004
15:00

Leicester Tigers	75 – 13	Rotherham Titans

Welford Road
Attendance: 16,815

2 May 2004
14:00

Harlequins	25 – 22	Bath

Twickenham Stoop
Attendance: 7,870

2 May 2004
14:30

Leeds Tykes	15 – 31	Northampton Saints

Headingley
Attendance: 4,239

2 May 2004
15:00

Newcastle Falcons	15 – 16	London Irish

Kingston Park
Attendance: 8,723

2 May 2004
15:00

Saracens	39 – 23	Sale Sharks

Vicarage Road
Attendance: 6,917

=== Week 24 ===
8 May 2004
15:00

Bath	41 – 7	Gloucester

Recreation Ground
Attendance: 9,980

8 May 2004
15:00

Leeds Tykes	20 – 31	Sale Sharks

Headingley
Attendance: 4,036

8 May 2004
15:00

London Irish	14 – 20	Saracens

Madejski Stadium
Attendance: 9,856

8 May 2004
15:00

London Wasps	17 – 48	Leicester Tigers

The Causeway Stadium
Attendance: 10,000

8 May 2004
15:00

Northampton Saints	18 – 17	Harlequins

Franklin’s Gardens
Attendance: 12,048

8 May 2004
15:00

Rotherham Titans	20 – 26	Newcastle Falcons

Don Valley Stadium
Attendance: 5,203

== Play-offs ==
As for the 2002–03 season, the first placed team automatically qualified for the final where they played the winner of the second vs third place semi-final.

=== Semi-final ===
16 May 2004
14:00

London Wasps	57 – 20	Northampton Saints
	Report

The Causeway Stadium, High Wycombe
Attendance: 6,219

=== Final ===
29 May 2004
18:00

Bath	6–10	London Wasps
P-Malone (1); DG-Malone (1)	Report	T-Abbott (1); C-van Gisbergen (1); DG-King (1)

Twickenham Stadium, London
Attendance: 59,500

Team details

Bath
London Wasps

Mike Catt
Andrew Higgins
Robbie Fleck
Mike Tindall
Alex Crockett
Chris Malone
Martyn Wood
Zak Feunati
Michael Lipman
Andy Beattie
Danny Grewcock
Steve Borthwick
Duncan Bell
Jonathan Humphreys (capt)
David Barnes
Replacements:
Hentie Martens
Lee Mears
Matt Stevens
Olly Barkley
Spencer Davey
James Scaysbrook
Rob Fidler
Coach:

Mark van Gisbergen
Josh Lewsey
Fraser Waters
Stuart Abbott
Tom Voyce
Alex King
Rob Howley
Lawrence Dallaglio (capt)
Paul Volley
Joe Worsley
Richard Birkett
Simon Shaw
Will Green
Trevor Leota
Tim Payne
Replacements:
Henry Nwume
Mark Lock
Ben Gotting
Martin Purdy
Peter Richards
Mark Denney
Ayoola Erinle
Coach:
Warren Gatland

== Zurich Wildcard ==
The Zurich Wildcard was contested by the teams placed fourth through seventh in the final table.

=== Semi finals ===
15 May 2004

Gloucester	44 – 35	Sale Sharks

Kingsholm, Gloucester
Attendance: 4,859

Despite winning this match, Gloucester forfeited their place in the final as English teams were awarded an additional Heineken Cup qualification place due to London Wasps winning the 2003–04 Heineken Cup. This additional place was awarded to Gloucester as the next highest placed team in the league not automatically qualified.

15 May 2004

Leicester Tigers	43 – 26	Harlequins

Welford Road, Leicester
Attendance: 12,004

=== Final ===
29 May 2004

Sale Sharks	27 – 48	Leicester Tigers

Twickenham, London
Attendance: 30,000

== Leading scorers ==
Note: Flags to the left of player names indicate national team as has been defined under World Rugby eligibility rules, or primary nationality for players who have not earned international senior caps. Players may hold one or more non-WR nationalities.

=== Most points ===
Rank	Player	Club	Points
1	(England) Andy Goode	Saracens/Leicester Tigers	266
2	(Australia) Shane Drahm	Northampton Saints	243
3	(New Zealand) Mark van Gisbergen	Wasps	229
4	(England) Olly Barkley	Bath	219
5	(England) Henry Paul	Gloucester	204
6	(England) Dave Walder	Newcastle Falcons	108
7	(Ireland) Barry Everitt	London Irish	147
8	(England) Mark Mapletoft	London Irish	145
9	(Ireland) Andy Dunne	Harlequins	134
10	(South Africa) Braam van Straaten	Sale Sharks	131

=== Most tries ===
Rank	Player	Club	Tries
1	(England) Steve Hanley	Sale Sharks	13
1	(New Zealand) Bruce Reihana	Northampton Saints	13
3	(England) Tom May	Newcastle Falcons	11
4	(England) Mark Cueto	Sale Sharks	10
5	(England) Ugo Monye	Harlequins	9
5	(England) Tom Voyce	Wasps	9
7	(Ireland) Simon Keogh	Harlequins	8
7	(England) Paul Sackey	London Irish	8
7	(England) James Simpson-Daniel	Gloucester	8
7	(England) Michael Stephenson	Newcastle Falcons	8
