= Jon Callard =

England international rugby union player

- Born: Jonathan Edward Brooks Callard; 1 January 1966 (age 60) Leicester, Leicestershire, England
- Height: 5 ft 10 in (1.78 m)
- Weight: 12 st 7 lb (79 kg)
- School: Bassaleg Comprehensive School

Rugby union career
- Position: Fullback
- Current team: RGC 1404 (head coach)
Amateur team(s)
Years	Team	Apps	(Points)
- Newport RFC
Senior career
Years	Team	Apps	(Points)
1989–1999	Bath Rugby	210	(2,087)
International career
Years	Team	Apps	(Points)
1993–1995	England	5	(69)
Coaching career
- Years: Team
- 2000–2002: Bath Rugby
- 2002–2005: Leeds Tykes
- 2025–: RGC 1404

Jonathan Edward Brooks Callard (born 1 January 1966) is a professional rugby union coach and former player. As a player, he played as a fullback for Bath and England. He is the brother of ex-Newport RFC player Nigel Callard.

Callard taught physical education classes and sports classes at Downside School (Somerset) in the early to mid-1990s. He also taught Biology to younger students.

Callard joined Bath from Newport in 1989. In November 1993 he made his international debut for England against the All Blacks, which saw England cause an upset, winning 15–9. Callard enjoyed a fine debut, scoring 12 points from four successful penalties. In February 1994, on his second appearance for England, Callard was again England's hero in the 1994 Five Nations Championship match between Scotland and England at the newly rebuilt Murrayfield Stadium in Edinburgh.

He kicked all of England's points from five penalties, in a scrappy and closely fought match, as England narrowly beat Scotland 15–14. Controversially, the winning penalty came deep into stoppage time at the end of the match with the score at 12–14, when the referee erroneously gave a penalty against Scotland in the final climactic tussle for possession. Video replays later confirmed that the ball was handled on the ground in a ruck by Rob Andrew, and the referee, believing it had been handled illegally by Scottish player Ian Jardine, awarded England a penalty. England's white jersey that season had 'blue' cuffs that matched the Scotland jersey, which could be easily mistaken in a mass crowd of bodies. Callard held his nerve against a cacophony of booing and jeering from the home fans and successfully kicked the resultant penalty, from nearly 50 yards out. As the kick went between the posts, the referee blew the final whistle, and Callard celebrated wildly with his relieved England teammates.

The adulation he received in the wake of such a dramatic victory was fleeting however, as despite his match winning performance against Scotland, Callard, along with several of his teammates were criticised after England's next match, a fortnight later, against Ireland at Twickenham. He missed four penalty attempts, and failed to prevent an Irish try by Simon Geoghegan. Although he managed to kick four successful penalties, England still lost the match 13–12. The defeat ended England's chances of a Grand Slam and reduced their chances of winning the Championship. Several England players were consequently dropped from the starting XV, for the remainder of the Five Nations campaign, including Callard. England's form improved, as they beat both France and Wales, though lost out on the Five Nations Championship on points difference to Wales.

Despite continuing to be selected for future England squads, including for their 1994 summer tour of South Africa, he fell behind, initially Paul Hull, and later Mike Catt, Tim Stimpson and Matt Perry as England's first-choice full-back. The intense competition for places in the England side over the next few years meant that Callard would only gain a total of five caps for England, although he did score an impressive total of 69 points in that time. He played in one solitary match in the 1995 Rugby World Cup against Western Samoa, scoring 21 points from the boot, in a 44–22 win that helped England progress to the Quarter Finals. Callard won his last cap for England in November 1995, in a 24–14 defeat to South Africa.

At club level with Bath he was part of a very successful side that won five English Courage League / Premiership titles, as well as five Pilkington / Premiership Rugby Cup titles from his debut in 1989 to 1996. His crowning achievement came late in his career when he scored all 19 of Bath's points in their 1998 Heineken Cup final victory over Brive. In August 1998 Callard was appointed assistant coach to Andy Robinson at Bath, before being made head coach in 2000. In 2002 he became assistant coach to Phil Davies at Leeds Tykes and later that year was also appointed as head coach of the England U21s. During his time at Leeds he coached them to victory the 2004–05 Powergen Cup, in the final of which they defeated his old side Bath. He joined the Rugby Football Union's National Academy in summer 2005.

Callard was appointed kicking coach to the senior England rugby team for the Rugby World Cup 2007.
