= 2003–04 Heineken Cup =

International rugby union competition

Tournament details
- Countries: England; France; Ireland; Italy; Scotland; Wales
- Tournament format(s): Round-robin and Knockout
- Date: 22 October 2003 – 23 May 2004

Tournament statistics
- Teams: 24
- Matches played: 79
- Attendance: 817,833 (10,352 per match)
- Top point scorer(s): Henry Paul (Gloucester) (100 points)
- Top try scorer(s): Nicolas Brusque (Biarritz); James Simpson-Daniel (Gloucester) (6 tries)

Final
- Venue: Twickenham Stadium, London
- Attendance: 73,057
- Champions: (England) London Wasps (1st title)
- Runners-up: (France) Toulouse

The 2003–04 Heineken Cup was the ninth season for which European teams competed for the Heineken Cup. Competing teams, from England, France, Ireland, Italy, Scotland and Wales, were divided into six pools of four, in which teams played home and away matches against each other. The winners of the pools, together with the two best runners-up, qualified for the knock-out stage.

This was the first competition in the series to employ the bonus point system for classifying teams. In prior competitions, teams earned two points for a win and one for a draw. Starting with the 2003–04 competition, teams earned points in the pool matches under the following scenarios:

- Four points for a win
- Two points for a draw
- One bonus point for scoring four or more tries, regardless of the final score
- One bonus point for losing by seven points or less

== Teams ==
France	England	Wales	Ireland	Scotland	Italy
(France) Stade Français; (France) Toulouse; (France) Biarritz Olympique; (France) Agen; (France) Bourgoin; (France) Perpignan	(England) Leicester Tigers; (England) Leeds Carnegie; (England) Sale Sharks; (England) Northampton Saints; (England) Gloucester; (England) London Wasps	(Wales) Newport Gwent Dragons; (Wales) Neath-Swansea Ospreys; (Wales) Cardiff Blues; (Wales) Llanelli Scarlets; (Wales) Celtic Warriors	(Ireland) Ulster; (Ireland) Munster; (Ireland) Leinster	(Scotland) Border Reivers; (Scotland) Edinburgh	(Italy) Benetton Treviso; (Italy) Calvisano

== Pool stage ==
=== Pool 1 ===
Team	P	W	D	L	Tries for	Tries against	Try diff	Points for	Points against	Points diff	TB	LB	Pts
(France) Stade Français Paris	6	4	0	2	11	8	3	134	80	54	1	1	18
(England) Leicester Tigers	6	3	0	3	17	10	7	137	115	22	3	0	15
(Ireland) Ulster	6	3	0	3	10	9	1	109	106	3	1	1	14
(Wales) Newport Gwent Dragons	6	2	0	4	5	16	−11	67	146	−79	0	1	9

=== Pool 2 ===
Team	P	W	D	L	Tries for	Tries against	Try diff	Points for	Points against	Points diff	TB	LB	Pts
(France) Toulouse	6	5	0	1	18	7	11	157	65	92	4	1	25
(Scotland) Edinburgh	6	5	0	1	14	7	7	130	89	41	2	0	22
(England) Leeds Tykes	6	1	0	5	5	11	−6	66	122	−56	0	1	5
(Wales) Neath-Swansea Ospreys	6	1	0	5	6	18	−12	78	155	−77	0	0	4

=== Pool 3 ===
Team	P	W	D	L	Tries for	Tries against	Try diff	Points for	Points against	Points diff	TB	LB	Pts
(France) Biarritz Olympique	6	4	0	2	18	12	6	139	97	42	3	1	20
(Ireland) Leinster	6	4	0	2	13	11	2	142	113	29	1	1	18
(Wales) Cardiff Blues	6	2	0	4	13	13	0	123	132	−9	0	3	11
(England) Sale Sharks	6	2	0	4	6	14	−8	75	137	−62	0	1	9

=== Pool 4 ===
Team	P	W	D	L	Tries for	Tries against	Try diff	Points for	Points against	Points diff	TB	LB	Pts
(Wales) Llanelli Scarlets	6	5	0	1	17	5	12	160	72	88	2	1	23
(England) Northampton Saints	6	4	0	2	13	4	9	121	54	67	1	1	18
(France) Agen	6	2	0	4	8	7	1	83	94	−11	1	2	11
(Scotland) The Borders	6	1	0	5	4	26	−22	39	183	−144	0	0	4

=== Pool 5 ===
Team	P	W	D	L	Tries for	Tries against	Try diff	Points for	Points against	Points diff	TB	LB	Pts
(Ireland) Munster Rugby	6	5	0	1	22	5	17	172	76	96	4	0	24
(England) Gloucester	6	5	0	1	22	11	11	197	100	97	4	0	24
(France) Bourgoin	6	1	0	5	13	22	−9	119	191	−72	2	1	7
(Italy) Benetton Treviso	6	1	0	5	13	32	−19	104	225	−121	1	0	5

=== Pool 6 ===
Team	P	W	D	L	Tries for	Tries against	Try diff	Points for	Points against	Points diff	TB	LB	Pts
(England) London Wasps	6	5	0	1	22	8	14	186	85	101	3	1	24
(Wales) Celtic Warriors	6	4	0	2	11	10	1	123	118	5	2	2	20
(France) Perpignan	6	3	0	3	13	11	2	119	115	4	2	1	15
(Italy) Ghial Rugby Calvisano	6	0	0	6	13	30	−17	115	225	−110	1	2	3

== Seeding and runners-up ==
Seed	Pool Winners	Pts	TF	+/-
1	(France) Toulouse	25	18	+92
2	(England) London Wasps	24	22	+101
3	(Ireland) Munster	24	22	+97
4	(Wales) Llanelli Scarlets	23	17	+88
5	(France) Biarritz Olympique	20	18	+42
6	(France) Stade Français Paris	18	11	+54
Seed	Pool Runners-up	Pts	TF	+/-
7	(England) Gloucester	24	22	+96
8	(Scotland) Edinburgh	22	14	+41
–	(Wales) Celtic Warriors	20	11	+5
–	(England) Northampton Saints	18	13	+67
–	(Ireland) Leinster	18	13	+29
–	(England) Leicester Tigers	15	17	+22

== Knockout stage ==
=== Quarter-finals ===
4 April 2004
19:45

Llanelli Scarlets (Wales)	10–27	(France) Biarritz

Stradey Park, Llanelli
Attendance: 10,800

10 April 2004
16:00

Toulouse (France)	36–10	(Scotland) Edinburgh

Stadium de Toulouse
Attendance: 36,500

10 April 2004
17:00

Munster (Ireland)	37–32	(France) Stade Français Paris
	Report

Thomond Park, Limerick
Attendance: 13,000

11 April 2004
15:00

London Wasps (England)	34–3	(England) Gloucester

Adams Park, High Wycombe
Attendance: 10,000

=== Semi-finals ===
24 April 2004
16:00

Toulouse (France)	19–11	(France) Biarritz

Stade Chaban-Delmas, Bordeaux
Attendance: 34,000

25 April 2004
15:00

Munster (Ireland)	32–37	(England) London Wasps
	Report

Lansdowne Road, Dublin
Attendance: 49,000

=== Final ===
23 May 2004
15:00

London Wasps (England)	27–20	(France) Toulouse
Try: Abbott 19' c Van Gisbergen 43' c Howley 79' c Con: Van Gisbergen (3); Pen: Van Gisbergen (2) 15', 31'	Report	Try: Delaigue 38' m Pen: Delaigue (2) 6', 12'; Élissalde (3) 57', 72', 77'

Twickenham Stadium, London
Attendance: 73,057
Referee: Alain Rolland (Ireland)
