= Jim Fleming (rugby union, born 1951) =

Scottish rugby union referee

James Mathieson Fleming MBE (born July 1951) is a retired Scottish Rugby Union Referee who refereed 42 major international matches and was a touch judge in a further 75. He also refereed 7 women's internationals including the 1994 World Cup Final. The international matches that he controlled were between 1985 and 2001 and included matches in four Rugby World Cups. He is Scotland’s most capped referee and was an International referee for 18 years.

== Refereeing career ==
Fleming was born in July 1951. He became a referee in 1973 after he was unable to play due to concussion. In 1983, the SRU appointed him to their international panel.

His first international was in 1985 when he refereed the Triple Crown decider between Ireland and England at Lansdowne Road. He refereed in four Rugby World Cups (1987, 1991, 1995 and 1999), taking charge of 12 matches. He refereed two semi finals – Australia v New Zealand (1991) and France v New Zealand (1999) as well as three quarter finals, Ireland v Australia (1991), South Africa v Samoa (1995) and England v South Africa (1999). He also refereed the opening match of the 1991 Rugby World Cup between England and New Zealand.

He refereed the Women's World Cup Final in 1994 between England and the USA.

In the six years he officiated in the European (Heinekin) Cup, Fleming refereed 4 Cup semi finals, 1 Challenge Cup semi final and the 1998 final between Bath and Brive.

Other credits to his name include 18 consecutive appearances at the Melrose Sevens, including refereeing 4 finals and for his final official match he refereed Scotland when he was in charge for their match against the Barbarians at Murrayfield in May 2001.

He retired from on-field duties in 2001, at the age of 50.

In 2005 he was elected as referees' representative to the Scottish Rugby Council, and served in this role until 2010.

He later became a TMO and referee assessor. He served as a director both on the Scottish Rugby Board and European Rugby Cup Ltd.

== Honours and awards ==
Fleming was awarded an MBE in the 2002 New Year Honours. He received the IRB's distinguished services award for refereeing in 2004 and the Scottish Rugby Union's Lifetime Achievement Award in 2001.

In addition, Fleming is honorary president of his rugby club Boroughmuir and a life member of the Edinburgh Rugby Referees Society.

In 2022 Fleming was inducted into the Melrose Rugby 7s Hall of Fame and in October 2025 he was the first referee to be inducted into Scottish Rugby’s Hall of Fame

== Professional career ==
Professionally, Fleming was a chartered building and quantity surveyor.
