= 2002 Six Nations Championship =

Rugby union championship

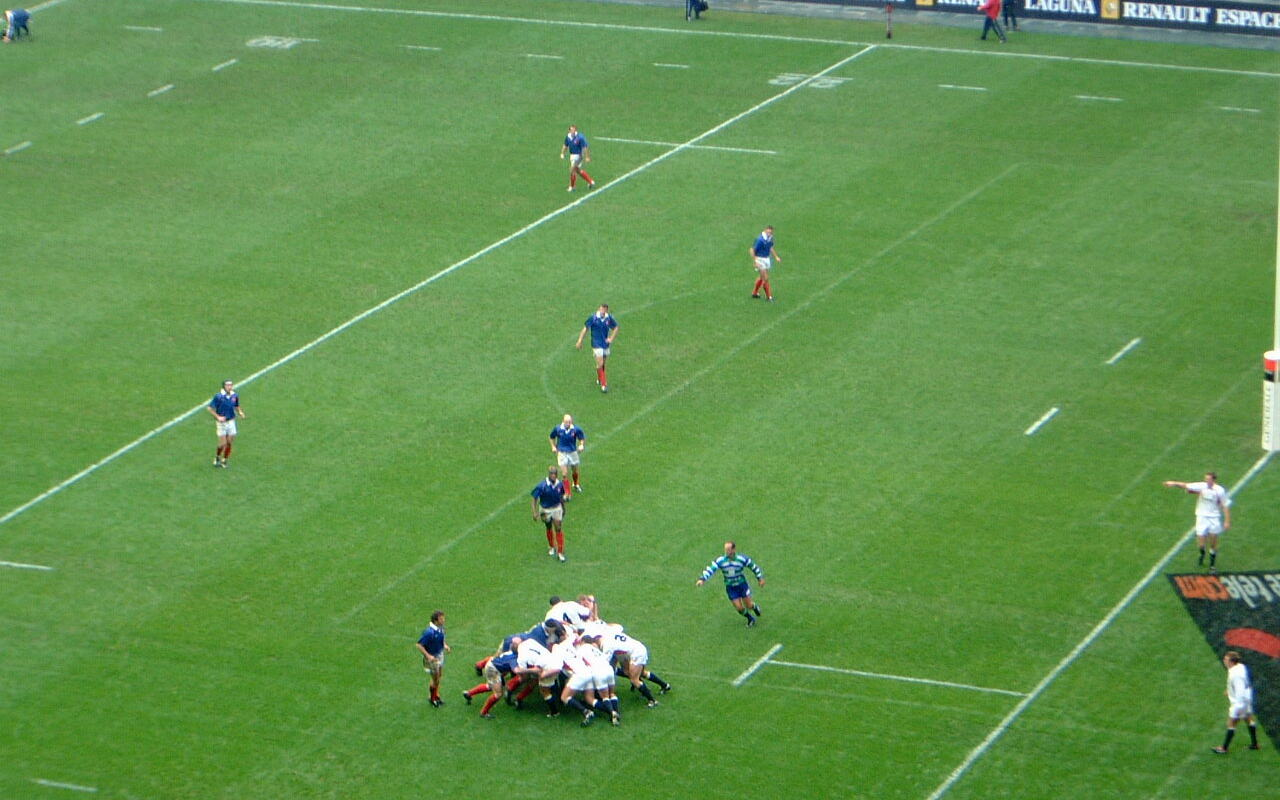
- France playing England on 2 March 2002
- Date: 2 February – 7 April 2002
- Countries: England; France; Ireland; Italy; Scotland; Wales

Tournament statistics
- Champions: France (13th title)
- Grand Slam: France (7th title)
- Triple Crown: England (22nd title)
- Matches played: 15
- Tries scored: 75 (5 per match)
- Top point scorer(s): (France) Gérald Merceron (80)
- Top try scorer(s): (England) Will Greenwood (5)

The 2002 Six Nations Championship was the third series of rugby union's Six Nations Championship, the 108th international championship overall. The annual tournament was won by France, who completed a grand slam.

== Participants ==
Nation	Venue	City	Head coach	Captain
England	Twickenham Stadium	London	(England) Clive Woodward	Martin Johnson/Neil Back
France	Stade de France	Saint-Denis	(France) Bernard Laporte	Olivier Magne/Raphaël Ibañez/Fabien Galthié
Ireland	Lansdowne Road	Dublin	(Republic of Ireland) Eddie O'Sullivan	Mick Galwey/David Humphreys/Keith Wood
Italy	Stadio Flaminio	Rome	(New Zealand) Brad Johnstone	Alessandro Moscardi
Scotland	Murrayfield Stadium	Edinburgh	(Scotland) Ian McGeechan	Budge Pountney/Bryan Redpath
Wales	Millennium Stadium	Cardiff	(New Zealand) Graham Henry/Steve Hansen	Scott Quinnell/Colin Charvis

== Table ==
Pos	Team	Pld	W	D	L	PF	PA	PD	T	Pts
1	France	5	5	0	0	156	75	+81	15	10
2	England	5	4	0	1	184	53	+131	23	8
3	Ireland	5	3	0	2	145	138	+7	16	6
4	Scotland	5	2	0	3	91	128	−37	6	4
5	Wales	5	1	0	4	119	188	−69	11	2
6	Italy	5	0	0	5	70	183	−113	4	0

Source: Six Nations Rugby

== Results ==
2 February 2002

France	33–12	Italy
Try: Traille 40' c Betsen 79' m Con: Merceron 40'; Pen: Merceron (7) 7', 35', 39', 40', 43', 58', 76'	Report	Pen: Dominguez (4) 2', 9', 20', 25'

Stade de France, Saint-Denis
Attendance: 65,000
Referee: Alan Lewis (Ireland)

FB	15	Nicolas Jeanjean		(substituted off) 52'
RW	14	Aurélien Rougerie
OC	13	Damien Traille
IC	12	Tony Marsh
LW	11	David Bory
FH	10	Gérald Merceron
SH	9	Frédéric Michalak		(substituted off) 79'
N8	8	Steven Hall
OF	7	Olivier Magne
BF	6	Serge Betsen
RL	5	Thibaut Privat
LL	4	David Auradou	(yellow card) 22'	(substituted off) 58'
TP	3	Pieter de Villiers
HK	2	Yannick Bru		(substituted off) 58'
LP	1	Jean-Jacques Crenca
Substitutions:
HK	16	Raphaël Ibañez		(substituted in) 58'
PR	17	Jean-Baptiste Poux
LK	18	Fabien Pelous		(substituted in) 58'
N8	19	Elvis Vermeulen
SH	20	Alexandre Albouy		(substituted in) 79'
FH	21	François Gelez
WG	22	Xavier Garbajosa		(substituted in) 52'
Coach:
Bernard Laporte

FB	15	Paolo Vaccari			(substituted off) 72'
RW	14	Denis Dallan	47' to 49'
OC	13	Cristian Stoica
IC	12	Luca Martin
LW	11	Roberto Pedrazzi
FH	10	Diego Domínguez (yellow card) 61'
SH	9	Alessandro Troncon
N8	8	Matthew Phillips (yellow card) 55'
OF	7	Marco Bortolami	(substituted off) 79'
BF	6	Mauro Bergamasco (yellow card) 44'
RL	5	Santiago Dellapè	(substituted off) 79'
LL	4	Carlo Checchinato (yellow card) 36'
TP	3	Andrea Muraro	(substituted off) 56'
HK	2	Alessandro Moscardi
LP	1	Andrea Lo Cicero	28' to 30'		(substituted off) 56'
Substitutions:
PR	16	Giampiero de Carli	(substituted in) 28'	(substituted off) 30'	(substituted in) 56'
PR	17	Alex Moreno	(substituted in) 56'
LK	18	Mark Giacheri	(substituted in) 79'
FL	19	Aaron Persico	(substituted in) 79'
SH	20	Juan Manuel Queirolo
FH	21	Ramiro Pez
CE	22	Mirco Bergamasco	(substituted in) 47'	(substituted off) 49'	(substituted in) 72'
Coach:
Brad Johnstone

2 February 2002

Scotland	3–29	England
Pen: Hodge 26'	Report	Try: Robinson (2) 7' m, 12' c Tindall 49' c Cohen 79' c Con: Wilkinson (2) 14', 50'; Hodgson 80'; Pen: Wilkinson 63'

Murrayfield Stadium, Edinburgh
Attendance: 67,500
Referee: Steve Walsh (New Zealand)

FB	15	Glenn Metcalfe
RW	14	Brendan Laney
OC	13	James McLaren
IC	12	Gregor Townsend
LW	11	Chris Paterson
FH	10	Duncan Hodge
SH	9	Bryan Redpath
N8	8	Simon Taylor
OF	7	Budge Pountney
BF	6	Jason White
RL	5	Stuart Grimes
LL	4	Scott Murray
TP	3	Mattie Stewart
HK	2	Gordon Bulloch
LP	1	Tom Smith	(substituted off) 60'
Substitutions:
HK	16	Robbie Russell
PR	17	George Graham	(substituted in) 60'
FL	18	Martin Leslie
FL	19	Jon Petrie
SH	20	Andy Nicol
CE	21	Andrew Henderson
WG	22	Jon Steel
Coach:
Ian McGeechan

FB	15	Jason Robinson
RW	14	Austin Healey
OC	12	Mike Tindall	(substituted off) 69'
IC	13	Will Greenwood
LW	11	Ben Cohen
FH	10	Jonny Wilkinson	(substituted off) 79'
SH	9	Kyran Bracken	(substituted off) 40'
N8	8	Joe Worsley
OF	7	Neil Back
BF	6	Richard Hill
RL	5	Ben Kay	(substituted off) 66'
LL	4	Martin Johnson
TP	3	Julian White	(substituted off) 72'
HK	2	Steve Thompson
LP	1	Graham Rowntree
Substitutions:
HK	16	Mark Regan
PR	17	Jason Leonard	(substituted in) 72'
LK	18	Danny Grewcock	(substituted in) 66'
N8	19	Martin Corry
SH	20	Nick Duncombe	(substituted in) 40'
FH	21	Charlie Hodgson	(substituted in) 79'
FB	22	Iain Balshaw	(substituted in) 69'
Coach:
Clive Woodward

3 February 2002

Ireland	54–10	Wales
Try: Murphy (2) 3' c, 47' c O'Connell 21' m Hickie 70' m Gleeson 72' c O'Gara 76' m Con: Humphreys (2) 4', 47'; O'Gara 73'; Pen: Humphreys (6) 9', 16', 30', 36', 52', 56'	Report	Try: S. Jones 61' c Con: S. Jones 62'; Pen: S. Jones 40'

Lansdowne Road, Dublin
Attendance: 49,000
Referee: Pablo de Luca (Argentina)

FB	15	Girvan Dempsey
RW	14	Geordan Murphy
OC	13	Brian O'Driscoll
IC	12	Kevin Maggs
LW	11	Denis Hickie	(substituted off) 72'
FH	10	David Humphreys	(substituted off) 72'
SH	9	Peter Stringer	(substituted off) 74'
N8	8	Anthony Foley
OF	7	David Wallace
BF	6	Simon Easterby
RL	5	Paul O'Connell
LL	4	Mick Galwey	(substituted off) 69'
TP	3	John Hayes
HK	2	Frankie Sheahan	(substituted off) 69'
LP	1	Peter Clohessy	(substituted off) 69'
Substitutions:
HK	16	Shane Byrne	(substituted in) 69'
PR	17	Paul Wallace	(substituted in) 69'
LK	18	Gary Longwell
FL	19	Keith Gleeson	(substituted in) 69'
SH	20	Guy Easterby	(substituted in) 74'
FH	21	Ronan O'Gara	(substituted in) 72'
CE	22	Rob Henderson	(substituted in) 72'
Coach:
Eddie O'Sullivan

FB	15	Kevin Morgan
RW	14	Dafydd James
OC	13	Jamie Robinson	(substituted off) 7'
IC	12	Iestyn Harris
LW	11	Craig Morgan
FH	10	Stephen Jones
SH	9	Rob Howley	(substituted off) 56'
N8	8	Scott Quinnell
OF	7	Martyn Williams
BF	6	Nathan Budgett
RL	5	Chris Wyatt	(substituted off) 4'
LL	4	Craig Quinnell
TP	3	Chris Anthony
HK	2	Robin McBryde	(substituted off) 68'
LP	1	Spencer John	(substituted off) 56'
Substitutions:
HK	16	Barry Williams	(substituted in) 68'
PR	17	Duncan Jones	(substituted in) 56'
LK	18	Ian Gough	(substituted in) 4'
FL	19	Brett Sinkinson
SH	20	Dwayne Peel	(substituted in) 56'
CE	21	Andy Marinos	(substituted in) 7'
FB	22	Rhys Williams
Coach:
Graham Henry

16 February 2002

Wales	33–37	France
Try: C. Quinnell 9' c Budgett 57' c K. Morgan 77' c Con: S. Jones (3) 9', 58', 79'; Pen: S. Jones (4) 1', 29', 32', 38'	Report	Try: Marsh (2) 25' m, 34' c Rougerie 40' c Con: Merceron (2) 35', 43'; Pen: Traille 4'; Merceron (4) 22', 40', 48', 70'; Drop: Merceron 31'

Millennium Stadium, Cardiff
Attendance: 69,000
Referee: David McHugh (Ireland)

FB	15	Kevin Morgan
RW	14	Dafydd James
OC	13	Tom Shanklin
IC	12	Andy Marinos	(substituted off) 70'
LW	11	Craig Morgan
FH	10	Stephen Jones
SH	9	Rob Howley
N8	8	Scott Quinnell (yellow card) 40'
OF	7	Martyn Williams
BF	6	Nathan Budgett
RL	5	Andy Moore
LL	4	Craig Quinnell	(substituted off) 67'
TP	3	Chris Anthony
HK	2	Robin McBryde	(substituted off) 62'
LP	1	Spencer John	(substituted off) 48'
Substitutions:
HK	16	Barry Williams	(substituted in) 62'
PR	17	Duncan Jones	(substituted in) 48'
LK	18	Ian Gough	(substituted in) 67'
FL	19	Gavin Thomas
SH	20	Dwayne Peel
FH	21	Iestyn Harris
FB	22	Rhys Williams	(substituted in) 70'
Coach:
Graham Henry

FB	15	Nicolas Brusque
RW	14	Aurélien Rougerie
OC	13	Tony Marsh
IC	12	Damien Traille
LW	11	Xavier Garbajosa
FH	10	Gérald Merceron
SH	9	Pierre Mignoni
N8	8	Steven Hall	(substituted off) 69'
OF	7	Imanol Harinordoquy
BF	6	Serge Betsen
RL	5	Olivier Brouzet
LL	4	Thibaut Privat	(substituted off) 59'
TP	3	Pieter de Villiers
HK	2	Raphaël Ibañez	(substituted off) 65'
LP	1	Jean-Jacques Crenca	(substituted off) 80'
Substitutions:
HK	16	Sébastien Bruno	(substituted in) 65'
PR	17	Olivier Milloud	(substituted in) 80'
LK	18	Fabien Pelous	(substituted in) 59'
FL	19	Alexandre Audebert	(substituted in) 69'
SH	20	Alexandre Albouy
FH	21	François Gelez
FB	22	Jimmy Marlu
Coach:
Bernard Laporte

16 February 2002

England	45–11	Ireland
Try: Wilkinson 22' c Cohen 24' c Greenwood (2) 32' c, 55' c Worsley 39' c Kay 44' c Con: Wilkinson (6) 23', 25', 33', 40', 44', 56'; Pen: Wilkinson 11'	Report	Try: O'Gara 59' m Pen: Humphreys (2) 8', 28'

Twickenham Stadium, London
Attendance: 75,000
Referee: Peter Marshall (Australia)

FB	15	Jason Robinson
RW	14	Austin Healey	(substituted off) 60'
OC	12	Mike Tindall
IC	13	Will Greenwood
LW	11	Ben Cohen
FH	10	Jonny Wilkinson	(substituted off) 78'
SH	9	Kyran Bracken	(substituted off) 78'
N8	8	Joe Worsley
OF	7	Neil Back
BF	6	Richard Hill	(substituted off) 60'
RL	5	Ben Kay
LL	4	Martin Johnson	(substituted off) 60'
TP	3	Phil Vickery
HK	2	Steve Thompson
LP	1	Graham Rowntree	(substituted off) 16'
Substitutions:
HK	16	Dorian West
PR	17	Jason Leonard	(substituted in) 16'
LK	18	Danny Grewcock	(substituted in) 60'
FL	19	Lewis Moody	(substituted in) 60'
SH	20	Nick Duncombe	(substituted in) 78'
FH	21	Charlie Hodgson	(substituted in) 78'
FB	22	Iain Balshaw	(substituted in) 60'
Coach:
Clive Woodward

FB	15	Girvan Dempsey
RW	14	Geordan Murphy	(substituted off) 7'
OC	13	Brian O'Driscoll
IC	12	Kevin Maggs
LW	11	Denis Hickie
FH	10	David Humphreys
SH	9	Peter Stringer
N8	8	Anthony Foley
OF	7	David Wallace
BF	6	Eric Miller	(substituted off) 57'
RL	5	Malcolm O'Kelly
LL	4	Mick Galwey	(substituted off) 57'
TP	3	John Hayes
HK	2	Frankie Sheahan	(substituted off) 53'
LP	1	Peter Clohessy	(substituted off) 79'
Substitutions:
HK	16	Shane Byrne	(substituted in) 53'
PR	17	Paul Wallace	(substituted in) 79'
LK	18	Gary Longwell	(substituted in) 57'
FL	19	Simon Easterby	(substituted in) 57'
SH	20	Guy Easterby
FH	21	Ronan O'Gara		(substituted in) 40'
CE	22	Rob Henderson	(substituted in) 7'	(substituted off) 40'
Coach:
Eddie O'Sullivan

16 February 2002

Italy	12–29	Scotland
Pen: Dominguez (4) 8', 25', 49', 55'	Report	Try: Townsend 73' c Laney 79' c Con: Laney (2) 75', 80'; Pen: Laney (5) 19', 26', 40', 58', 64'

Stadio Flaminio, Rome
Attendance: 23,000
Referee: Kelvin Deaker (New Zealand)

FB	15	Paolo Vaccari		(substituted off) 71'
RW	14	Roberto Pedrazzi
OC	13	Cristian Stoica
IC	12	Mirco Bergamasco
LW	11	Denis Dallan
FH	10	Diego Domínguez		(substituted off) 80'
SH	9	Alessandro Troncon
N8	8	Matthew Phillips		(substituted off) 80'
OF	7	Mauro Bergamasco (yellow card) 15'
BF	6	Marco Bortolami
RL	5	Santiago Dellapè	(yellow card) 58'	(substituted off) 65'
LL	4	Carlo Checchinato
TP	3	Federico Pucciariello		(substituted off) 58'
HK	2	Alessandro Moscardi
LP	1	Giampiero de Carli		(substituted off) 62'
Substitutions:
PR	16	Alex Moreno		(substituted in) 58'
PR	17	Andrea Lo Cicero		(substituted in) 62'
LK	18	Mark Giacheri		(substituted in) 65'
CE	19	Luca Martin		(substituted in) 71'
FL	20	Aaron Persico
FH	21	Ramiro Pez		(substituted in) 80'
SH	22	Juan Manuel Queirolo		(substituted in) 80'
Coach:
Brad Johnstone

FB	15	Brendan Laney
RW	14	Glenn Metcalfe
OC	13	James McLaren
IC	12	Andrew Henderson
LW	11	Chris Paterson
FH	10	Gregor Townsend
SH	9	Bryan Redpath
N8	8	Simon Taylor
OF	7	Andrew Mower	(yellow card) 15'	(substituted off) 73'
BF	6	Jason White
RL	5	Stuart Grimes
LL	4	Scott Murray
TP	3	Mattie Stewart		(substituted off) 62'
HK	2	Gordon Bulloch
LP	1	Tom Smith
Substitutions:
PR	16	George Graham		(substituted in) 62'
FL	17	Martin Leslie		(substituted in) 73'
HK	18	Robbie Russell
FL	19	Jon Petrie
SH	20	Graeme Beveridge
FH	21	Duncan Hodge
WG	22	Kenny Logan
Coach:
Ian McGeechan

2 March 2002

France	20–15	England
Try: Merceron 9' c Harinordoquy 18' c Con: Merceron (2) 11', 19'; Pen: Merceron (2) 36', 59'	Report	Try: Robinson 40' c Cohen 79' m Con: Wilkinson 40'; Pen: Wilkinson 42'

Stade de France, Saint-Denis
Attendance: 79,502
Referee: André Watson (South Africa)

FB	15	Nicolas Brusque
RW	14	Aurélien Rougerie
OC	13	Tony Marsh
IC	12	Damien Traille
LW	11	David Bory
FH	10	Gérald Merceron
SH	9	Fabien Galthié	(substituted off) 67'
N8	8	Imanol Harinordoquy			(substituted off) 78'
OF	7	Olivier Magne
BF	6	Serge Betsen	57' to 64'
RL	5	David Auradou
LL	4	Olivier Brouzet	(substituted off) 60'
TP	3	Pieter de Villiers
HK	2	Raphaël Ibañez	(substituted off) 74'
LP	1	Jean-Jacques Crenca	(substituted off) 60'
Substitutions:
PR	16	Olivier Milloud	(substituted in) 74'
HK	17	Olivier Azam	(substituted in) 60'
LK	18	Fabien Pelous	(substituted in) 60'
FL	19	Rémy Martin	(substituted in) 57'	(substituted off) 64'	(substituted in) 78'
SH	20	Pierre Mignoni	(substituted in) 67'
FH	21	François Gelez
FB	22	Jimmy Marlu
Coach:
Bernard Laporte

FB	15	Jason Robinson
RW	14	Austin Healey
OC	12	Mike Tindall	(substituted off) 39'
IC	13	Will Greenwood
LW	11	Ben Cohen
FH	10	Jonny Wilkinson	(substituted off) 74'
SH	9	Kyran Bracken
N8	8	Joe Worsley			(substituted off) 60'
OF	7	Neil Back	48' to 55'
BF	6	Richard Hill
RL	5	Ben Kay	(substituted off) 74'
LL	4	Martin Johnson
TP	3	Phil Vickery
HK	2	Steve Thompson	(substituted off) 74'
LP	1	Graham Rowntree	(substituted off) 74'
Substitutions:
HK	16	Dorian West	(substituted in) 74'
PR	17	Jason Leonard	(substituted in) 74'
LK	18	Danny Grewcock	(substituted in) 74'
N8	19	Martin Corry	(substituted in) 48'	(substituted off) 55'	(substituted in) 60'
SH	20	Nick Duncombe
CE	21	Henry Paul	(substituted in) 39'
WG	22	Dan Luger	(substituted in) 74'
Coach:
Clive Woodward

2 March 2002

Wales	44–20	Italy
Try: C. Morgan 1' c James 11' c R. Williams 44' c S. Quinnell 51' c Marinos 54' c Con: S. Jones (5) 2', 12', 45', 52', 55'; Pen: S. Jones (3) 18', 24', 36'	Report	Try: Checchinato 20' c Raineri 73' c Con: Pez 22'; Peens 75'; Pen: Pez 5'; Peens 31'

Millennium Stadium, Cardiff
Attendance: 58,349
Referee: Chris White (England)

FB	15	Kevin Morgan	(substituted off) 59'
RW	14	Dafydd James
OC	13	Tom Shanklin	(substituted off) 22'
IC	12	Andy Marinos
LW	11	Craig Morgan
FH	10	Stephen Jones
SH	9	Rob Howley	(substituted off) 52'
N8	8	Scott Quinnell	(substituted off) 63'
OF	7	Martyn Williams
BF	6	Nathan Budgett
RL	5	Andy Moore
LL	4	Ian Gough	(substituted off) 52'
TP	3	Chris Anthony	(substituted off) 77'
HK	2	Robin McBryde	(substituted off) 59'
LP	1	Iestyn Thomas
Substitutions:
HK	16	Barry Williams	(substituted in) 59'
PR	17	Spencer John	(substituted in) 77'
LK	18	Chris Wyatt	(substituted in) 52'
FL	19	Brett Sinkinson	(substituted in) 63'
SH	20	Dwayne Peel	(substituted in) 52'
FH	21	Iestyn Harris	(substituted in) 59'
FB	22	Rhys Williams	(substituted in) 22'
Coach:
Graham Henry

FB	15	Gert Peens
RW	14	Roberto Pedrazzi	(substituted off) 67'
OC	13	Mirco Bergamasco	(substituted off) 65'
IC	12	Cristian Stoica
LW	11	Nicola Mazzucato
FH	10	Ramiro Pez	(substituted off) 65'
SH	9	Alessandro Troncon
N8	8	Carlo Checchinato
OF	7	Mauro Bergamasco
BF	6	Aaron Persico (yellow card) 50'
RL	5	Marco Bortolami	(substituted off) 60'
LL	4	Mark Giacheri
TP	3	Salvatore Perugini	(substituted off) 69'
HK	2	Alessandro Moscardi
LP	1	Giampiero de Carli	(substituted off) 48'
Substitutions:
PR	16	Federico Pucciariello	(substituted in) 69'
PR	17	Andrea Lo Cicero	(substituted in) 48'
FL	18	Andrea Benatti	(substituted in) 67'
N8	19	Matthew Phillips	(substituted in) 60'
SH	20	Matteo Mazzantini
FH	21	Francesco Mazzariol	(substituted in) 65'
CE	22	Giovanni Raineri	(substituted in) 65'
Coach:
Brad Johnstone

2 March 2002

Ireland	43–22	Scotland
Try: O'Driscoll (3) 25' m, 39' c, 79' c Horgan 33' c Easterby 64' m Con: Humphreys (2) 34', 40'; O'Gara 79'; Pen: Humphreys (4) 1', 50', 53', 58'	Report	Try: Leslie 70' c Con: Laney 70'; Pen: Laney (5) 10', 14', 23', 40', 46'

Lansdowne Road, Dublin
Attendance: 49,000
Referee: Nigel Whitehouse (Wales)

FB	15	Girvan Dempsey
RW	14	Geordan Murphy
OC	13	Brian O'Driscoll
IC	12	Kevin Maggs
LW	11	Denis Hickie
FH	10	David Humphreys	(substituted off) 78'
SH	9	Peter Stringer	(substituted off) 79'
N8	8	Anthony Foley
OF	7	David Wallace
BF	6	Eric Miller	(substituted off) 47'
RL	5	Malcolm O'Kelly
LL	4	Mick Galwey	(substituted off) 71'
TP	3	John Hayes
HK	2	Frankie Sheahan	(substituted off) 34'
LP	1	Peter Clohessy	(substituted off) 78'
Substitutions:
HK	16	Shane Byrne	(substituted in) 34'
PR	17	Paul Wallace	(substituted in) 78'
LK	18	Gary Longwell	(substituted in) 71'
FL	19	Simon Easterby	(substituted in) 47'
SH	20	Guy Easterby	(substituted in) 79'
FH	21	Ronan O'Gara	(substituted in) 78'
CE	22	Rob Henderson
Coach:
Eddie O'Sullivan

FB	15	Brendan Laney
RW	14	Glenn Metcalfe		(substituted off) 71'
OC	13	James McLaren
IC	12	Andrew Henderson
LW	11	Chris Paterson
FH	10	Gregor Townsend
SH	9	Bryan Redpath
N8	8	Simon Taylor
OF	7	Budge Pountney	(yellow card) 59'
BF	6	Jason White		(substituted off) 56'
RL	5	Stuart Grimes
LL	4	Scott Murray
TP	3	Mattie Stewart		(substituted off) 63'
HK	2	Gordon Bulloch
LP	1	Tom Smith
Substitutions:
FL	16	Jon Petrie
PR	17	George Graham		(substituted in) 63'
FL	18	Martin Leslie		(substituted in) 56'
SH	19	Graeme Beveridge
FH	20	Duncan Hodge
WG	21	Kenny Logan
HK	22	Robbie Russell		(substituted in) 71'
Coach:
Ian McGeechan

23 March 2002

Ireland	32–17	Italy
Try: Kelly (2) 38' c, 47' m Hickie 75' m Con: O'Gara 39'; Pen: Humphreys (4) 4', 11', 16', 60'; O'Gara 40'	Report	Try: Ma. Bergamasco 53' c De Carli 79' c Con: Dominguez (2) 54', 80'; Pen: Peens 43'

Lansdowne Road, Dublin
Attendance: 49,000
Referee: Rob Dickson (Scotland)

FB	15	Girvan Dempsey
RW	14	John Kelly
OC	13	Brian O'Driscoll
IC	12	Shane Horgan
LW	11	Denis Hickie	(substituted off) 79'
FH	10	David Humphreys	32' to 40'
SH	9	Peter Stringer
N8	8	Anthony Foley
OF	7	David Wallace	(substituted off) 79'
BF	6	Simon Easterby
RL	5	Malcolm O'Kelly	(substituted off) 70'
LL	4	Gary Longwell
TP	3	John Hayes
HK	2	Shane Byrne
LP	1	Peter Clohessy	(substituted off) 76'
Substitutions:
HK	16	Frankie Sheahan
PR	17	Paul Wallace	(substituted in) 76'
LK	18	Paul O'Connell	(substituted in) 70'
N8	19	Eric Miller	(substituted in) 79'
SH	20	Guy Easterby
FH	21	Ronan O'Gara	(substituted in) 32'	(substituted off) 40'
WG	22	Tyrone Howe	(substituted in) 79'
Coach:
Eddie O'Sullivan

FB	15	Gert Peens
RW	14	Nicola Mazzucato
OC	13	Cristian Stoica
IC	12	Giovanni Raineri
LW	11	Denis Dallan
FH	10	Diego Domínguez
SH	9	Alessandro Troncon
N8	8	Matthew Phillips		(substituted off) 67'
OF	7	Mauro Bergamasco
BF	6	Aaron Persico
RL	5	Mark Giacheri
LL	4	Marco Bortolami		(substituted off) 60'
TP	3	Salvatore Perugini	(yellow card) 24'	(substituted off) 37'
HK	2	Alessandro Moscardi
LP	1	Giampiero de Carli	(yellow card) 40'
Substitutions:
HK	16	Andrea Moretti
PR	17	Federico Pucciariello		(substituted in) 37'
LK	18	Santiago Dellapè		(substituted in) 60'
FL	19	Andrea de Rossi		(substituted in) 67'
SH	20	Matteo Mazzantini
FH	21	Ramiro Pez
CE	22	Cristian Zanoletti
Coach:
Brad Johnstone

23 March 2002

England	50–10	Wales
Try: Greenwood 9' c Wilkinson 43' c Luger (2) 64' c, 67' c Stimpson 79' c Con: Wilkinson (5) 10', 44', 65', 69', 79'; Pen: Wilkinson (4) 21', 36', 40', 53'; Drop: Wilkinson 4'	Report	Try: Harris 72' c Con: Harris 73'; Pen: Harris 29'

Twickenham Stadium, London
Attendance: 75,000
Referee: Andrew Cole (Australia)

FB	15	Austin Healey
RW	14	Ben Cohen
OC	12	Mike Tindall	(substituted off) 64'
IC	13	Will Greenwood
LW	11	Dan Luger
FH	10	Jonny Wilkinson
SH	9	Kyran Bracken	(substituted off) 59'
N8	8	Richard Hill			(substituted off) 79'
OF	7	Neil Back
BF	6	Lewis Moody	42' to 51'
RL	5	Ben Kay	19' to 27'
LL	4	Danny Grewcock
TP	3	Julian White
HK	2	Steve Thompson	(substituted off) 66'
LP	1	Graham Rowntree
Substitutions:
HK	16	Dorian West	(substituted in) 66'
PR	17	Jason Leonard
N8	18	Martin Corry	(substituted in) 19'	(substituted off) 27'
FL	19	Joe Worsley	(substituted in) 42'	(substituted off) 51'	(substituted in) 79'
SH	20	Matt Dawson	(substituted in) 59'
FH	21	Charlie Hodgson
FB	22	Tim Stimpson	(substituted in) 64'
Coach:
Clive Woodward

FB	15	Kevin Morgan
RW	14	Dafydd James
OC	13	Gareth Thomas	(substituted off) 49'
IC	12	Andy Marinos
LW	11	Craig Morgan
FH	10	Iestyn Harris
SH	9	Rob Howley	(substituted off) 59'
N8	8	Scott Quinnell
OF	7	Martyn Williams	(substituted off) 50'
BF	6	Nathan Budgett
RL	5	Chris Wyatt	(substituted off) 51'
LL	4	Andy Moore
TP	3	Chris Anthony
HK	2	Robin McBryde	(substituted off) 66'
LP	1	Iestyn Thomas
Substitutions:
HK	16	Barry Williams	(substituted in) 66'
PR	17	Spencer John
LK	18	Ian Gough	(substituted in) 51'
FL	19	Colin Charvis	(substituted in) 50'
SH	20	Dwayne Peel	(substituted in) 59'
FH	21	Stephen Jones
CE	22	Tom Shanklin	(substituted in) 49'
Coach:
Graham Henry

23 March 2002

Scotland	10–22	France
Try: Redpath 53' c Con: Laney 54'; Pen: Laney 7'	Report	Try: Marsh (2) 16' c, 41' m Galthié 46' c Con: Merceron (2) 17', 47'; Pen: Merceron 29'

Murrayfield Stadium, Edinburgh
Attendance: 62,500
Referee: Alain Rolland (Ireland)

FB	15	Brendan Laney
RW	14	Glenn Metcalfe
OC	13	James McLaren	(substituted off) 74'
IC	12	John Leslie
LW	11	Chris Paterson
FH	10	Gregor Townsend
SH	9	Bryan Redpath
N8	8	Simon Taylor
OF	7	Budge Pountney
BF	6	Martin Leslie	26' to 40'
RL	5	Jason White
LL	4	Scott Murray	(substituted off) 58'
TP	3	Mattie Stewart	(substituted off) 57'
HK	2	Gordon Bulloch	(substituted off) 71'
LP	1	Tom Smith
Substitutions:
HK	16	Robbie Russell	(substituted in) 71'
PR	17	George Graham	(substituted in) 57'
LK	18	Stuart Grimes	(substituted in) 58'
FL	19	Jon Petrie	(substituted in) 26'	(substituted off) 40'
SH	20	Graeme Beveridge
FH	21	Duncan Hodge
WG	22	Kenny Logan	(substituted in) 74'
Coach:
Ian McGeechan

FB	15	Nicolas Brusque	(substituted off) 48'
RW	14	Aurélien Rougerie
OC	13	Tony Marsh
IC	12	Damien Traille
LW	11	David Bory
FH	10	Gérald Merceron
SH	9	Fabien Galthié
N8	8	Imanol Harinordoquy
OF	7	Olivier Magne
BF	6	Serge Betsen	(substituted off) 73'
RL	5	Olivier Brouzet
LL	4	Fabien Pelous	(substituted off) 62'
TP	3	Jean-Baptiste Poux	(substituted off) 58'
HK	2	Raphaël Ibañez
LP	1	Jean-Jacques Crenca
Substitutions:
HK	16	Olivier Azam
PR	17	Sylvain Marconnet	(substituted in) 58'
LK	18	Thibaut Privat	(substituted in) 62'
FL	19	Rémy Martin	(substituted in) 73'
SH	20	Pierre Mignoni
FH	21	François Gelez
WG	22	Jimmy Marlu	(substituted in) 48'
Coach:
Bernard Laporte

6 April 2002

France	44–5	Ireland
Try: Betsen (2) 2' c, 56' m Brusque (2) 26' m, 78' m Rougerie 31' c Con: Merceron (2) 3', 31'; Pen: Merceron (4) 13', 23', 38', 48'; Gelez 77'	Report	Try: Wood 10' m

Stade de France, Saint-Denis
Attendance: 79,978
Referee: Paddy O'Brien (New Zealand)

FB	15	Nicolas Brusque
RW	14	Aurélien Rougerie
OC	13	Tony Marsh
IC	12	Damien Traille
LW	11	David Bory	(substituted off) 77'
FH	10	Gérald Merceron	(substituted off) 64'
SH	9	Fabien Galthié	(substituted off) 77'
N8	8	Imanol Harinordoquy
OF	7	Olivier Magne	(substituted off) 77'
BF	6	Serge Betsen
RL	5	Olivier Brouzet	(substituted off) 73'
LL	4	Fabien Pelous
TP	3	Pieter de Villiers	(substituted off) 64'
HK	2	Raphaël Ibañez	(substituted off) 77'
LP	1	Jean-Jacques Crenca
Substitutions:
HK	16	Olivier Azam	(substituted in) 77'
PR	17	Jean-Baptiste Poux	(substituted in) 64'
LK	18	David Auradou	(substituted in) 73'
FL	19	Rémy Martin	(substituted in) 77'
SH	20	Pierre Mignoni	(substituted in) 77'
FH	21	François Gelez	(substituted in) 64'
FB	22	Jimmy Marlu	(substituted in) 77'
Coach:
Bernard Laporte

FB	15	Girvan Dempsey
RW	14	Shane Horgan
OC	13	Brian O'Driscoll
IC	12	Rob Henderson
LW	11	Denis Hickie
FH	10	David Humphreys	(substituted off) 49'
SH	9	Peter Stringer
N8	8	Anthony Foley
OF	7	David Wallace	(substituted off) 49'
BF	6	Simon Easterby
RL	5	Malcolm O'Kelly
LL	4	Gary Longwell	(substituted off) 64'
TP	3	John Hayes
HK	2	Keith Wood
LP	1	Peter Clohessy	(substituted off) 62'
Substitutions:
HK	16	Shane Byrne
PR	17	Paul Wallace	(substituted in) 62'
LK	18	Paul O'Connell	(substituted in) 64'
FL	19	Keith Gleeson	(substituted in) 49'
SH	20	Guy Easterby
FH	21	Ronan O'Gara	(substituted in) 49'
WG	22	John Kelly
Coach:
Eddie O'Sullivan

6 April 2002

Wales	22–27	Scotland
Try: R. Williams 45' c Con: S. Jones 46'; Pen: S. Jones (5) 8', 14', 16', 62', 78'	Report	Try: Bulloch (2) 18' m, 28' c Con: Laney 30'; Pen: Laney (4) 40', 59', 75', 79'; Hodge 79'

Millennium Stadium, Cardiff
Attendance: 68,000
Referee: Joël Jutge (France)

FB	15	Kevin Morgan
RW	14	Rhys Williams
OC	13	Mark Taylor
IC	12	Andy Marinos	(substituted off) 44'
LW	11	Craig Morgan	(substituted off) 73'
FH	10	Stephen Jones
SH	9	Rob Howley	(substituted off) 66'
N8	8	Colin Charvis
OF	7	Martyn Williams
BF	6	Nathan Budgett	(substituted off) 40'
RL	5	Andy Moore	(substituted off) 12'
LL	4	Ian Gough
TP	3	Chris Anthony
HK	2	Barry Williams	(substituted off) 44'
LP	1	Iestyn Thomas	(substituted off) 58'
Substitutions:
HK	16	Robin McBryde	(substituted in) 44'
PR	17	Spencer John	(substituted in) 58'
LK	18	Chris Wyatt	(substituted in) 12'
FL	19	Gavin Thomas	(substituted in) 40'
SH	20	Dwayne Peel	(substituted in) 66'
FH	21	Iestyn Harris	(substituted in) 44'
WG	22	Dafydd James	(substituted in) 73'
Coach:
Graham Henry

FB	15	Brendan Laney	(substituted off) 79'
RW	14	Kenny Logan	(substituted off) 60'
OC	13	James McLaren
IC	12	John Leslie
LW	11	Chris Paterson
FH	10	Gregor Townsend
SH	9	Bryan Redpath
N8	8	Simon Taylor
OF	7	Budge Pountney
BF	6	Martin Leslie	(substituted off) 71'
RL	5	Jason White	(substituted off) 58'
LL	4	Scott Murray
TP	3	Mattie Stewart	(substituted off) 40'
HK	2	Gordon Bulloch	(substituted off) 78'
LP	1	Tom Smith
Substitutions:
HK	16	Robbie Russell	(substituted in) 78'
PR	17	George Graham	(substituted in) 40'
LK	18	Stuart Grimes	(substituted in) 58'
FL	19	Jon Petrie	(substituted in) 71'
SH	20	Graeme Beveridge
FH	21	Duncan Hodge	(substituted in) 79'
FB	22	Glenn Metcalfe	(substituted in) 60'
Coach:
Ian McGeechan

7 April 2002

Italy	9–45	England
Pen: Domínguez (3) 5', 44', 51'	Report	Try: Greenwood (2) 8' c, 68' c Cohen 24' c Robinson 36' c Dallaglio 59' c Healey 80' c Con: Wilkinson (5) 9', 25', 37', 68', 80'; Dawson 61'; Pen: Wilkinson 2'

Stadio Flaminio, Rome
Attendance: 25,000
Referee: Mark Lawrence (South Africa)

FB	15	Gert Peens	(substituted off) 73'
RW	14	Nicola Mazzucato
OC	13	Cristian Stoica	(substituted off) 80'
IC	12	Giovanni Raineri	(substituted off) 49'
LW	11	Denis Dallan
FH	10	Diego Domínguez
SH	9	Alessandro Troncon
N8	8	Matthew Phillips	(substituted off) 49'
OF	7	Mauro Bergamasco
BF	6	Aaron Persico
RL	5	Mark Giacheri	(substituted off) 59'
LL	4	Marco Bortolami
TP	3	Federico Pucciariello	(substituted off) 59'	(substituted in) 79'
HK	2	Alessandro Moscardi	(substituted off) 73'
LP	1	Giampiero de Carli		(substituted off) 79'
Substitutions:
HK	16	Andrea Moretti	(substituted in) 73'
PR	17	Carlos Nieto	(substituted in) 59'
LK	18	Santiago Dellapè	(substituted in) 59'
FL	19	Andrea de Rossi	(substituted in) 49'
SH	20	Matteo Mazzantini	(substituted in) 80'
FH	21	Ramiro Pez	(substituted in) 73'
CE	22	Cristian Zanoletti	(substituted in) 49'
Coach:
Brad Johnstone

FB	15	Jason Robinson
RW	14	Dan Luger
OC	12	Mike Tindall
IC	13	Will Greenwood
LW	11	Ben Cohen
FH	10	Jonny Wilkinson
SH	9	Kyran Bracken	(substituted off) 56'
N8	8	Richard Hill
OF	7	Neil Back	(substituted off) 56'
BF	6	Lewis Moody
RL	5	Ben Kay
LL	4	Danny Grewcock	19' to 23'		(substituted off) 56'
TP	3	Julian White
HK	2	Steve Thompson	(substituted off) 72'
LP	1	Graham Rowntree	(substituted off) 56'
Substitutions:
HK	16	Dorian West	(substituted in) 72'
PR	17	Jason Leonard	(substituted in) 56'
LK	18	Martin Johnson	(substituted in) 19'	(substituted off) 23'	(substituted in) 56'
N8	19	Lawrence Dallaglio	(substituted in) 56'
SH	20	Matt Dawson	(substituted in) 56'
FH	21	Charlie Hodgson
WG	22	Austin Healey
Coach:
Clive Woodward
