= 2002 France rugby union tour of Argentina and Australia =

2002 rugby event

Summary
P	W	D	L
Total
5	0	0	5
Test match
3	0	0	3
Opponent
P	W	D	L
Argentina
1	0	0	1
Australia
2	0	0	2

Tour chronology
- ← South Africa & New Zealand 2001 Argentina & New Zealand 2003 →

The 2002 France rugby union tour of Argentina and Australia was a series of matches of the France national team during their tour to Argentina and Australia in 2002. It was the 12th visit of a French side to Argentina and the 8th to Australia.

It was one of the less successful France tours: out of five matches played, including three full tests, the team lost all of them.

== Match summary ==
(test match)

Date	Rival	Res.	Venue	City
15 June	Argentina	27–28	Vélez Sarsfield	Buenos Aires
18 June	Australia A	31–32	Adelaide Oval	Adelaide
22 June	Australia	17–29	Docklands	Melbourne
26 June	Australia A	34–37	Central Coast	Gosford
29 June	Australia	25–31	Stadium Australia	Sydney

== Match details ==
15 June 2002

Argentina	28–27	France
Try: Albanese; Contepomi; Mendez; Con: Contepomi (2); Pen: Contepomi (2); Drop: Quesada		Try: Brusque; Jeanjean; Marsh; Con: Merceron (3); Pen: Merceron (2)

Vélez Sarsfield, Buenos Aires
Attendance: 35,000
Referee: Peter Marshall (Australia)

Team details

Argentina
France

Argentina: 15. Ignacio Corleto, 14. Gonzalo Camardón, 13. José Orengo, 12. Lisandro Arbizu (c), 11. Diego Albanese, 10. Felipe Contepomi, 9. Agustín Pichot, 8. Gonzalo Longo, 7. Rolando Martín, 6. Santiago Phelan, 5. Rimas Álvarez Kairelis, 4. Ignacio Fernández Lobbe, 3. Omar Hasan, 2. Federico Méndez, 1. Mauricio Reggiardo, – Replacements: Gonzalo Quesada, Roberto Grau, Mario Ledesma, Martín Durand – Unused: 20. Lucas Ostiglia, 21. Nicolás Fernández Miranda, 22. José María Núñez Piossek
France: 15. Nicolas Brusque, 14. Aurélien Rougerie, 13. Tony Marsh, 12. Damien Traille, 11. Nicolas Jeanjean, 10. Gérald Merceron, 9. Pierre Mignoni, 8. Christian Labit, 7. Olivier Magne, 6. Serge Betsen, 5. Olivier Brouzet, 4. Fabien Pelous, 3. Jean-Baptiste Poux, 2. Raphaël Ibañez (c), 1. Jean-Jacques Crenca, – Replacements: Christophe Porcu, Sébastien Chabal, Sylvain Marconnet, Olivier Azam, Frédéric Michalak, François Gelez, Yannick Jauzion

18 June 2002

Australia A	32–31	France XV

Adelaide Oval, Adelaide

22 June 2002

Australia	29–17	France
Try: Larkham; Latham; Con: Burke (2); Pen: Burke (5)		Try: Poux; Pen: Gelez (3); Traille

Docklands, Melbourne
Attendance: 37,482
Referee: Chris White (England)

Team details

Australia: 15. Chris Latham, 14. Wendell Sailor, 13. Matt Burke, 12. Dan Herbert, 11. Stirling Mortlock, 10. Stephen Larkham, 9. George Gregan (c), 8. Toutai Kefu, 7. George Smith, 6. Owen Finegan, 5. Justin Harrison, 4. Nathan Sharpe, 3. Patricio Noriega, 2. Jeremy Paul, 1. Bill Young, – Replacements: 16. Brendan Cannon, 17. Rod Moore, 18. Matt Cockbain, 19. David Lyons, 21. Elton Flatley, 22. Mat Rogers – Unused: 20. Chris Whitaker
France: 15. Pepito Elhorga, 14. Aurélien Rougerie, 13. Tony Marsh, 12. Damien Traille, 11. Nicolas Jeanjean, 10. François Gelez, 9. Frédéric Michalak, 8. Imanol Harinordoquy, 7. Olivier Magne, 6. Serge Betsen, 5. Christophe Porcu, 4. Fabien Pelous (c), 3. Sylvain Marconnet, 2. Olivier Azam, 1. Arnaud Martinez, – Replacements: 16. Raphaël Ibañez, 17. Jean-Baptiste Poux, 18. Olivier Brouzet, 19. Christian Labit, 22. Yannick Jauzion – Unused: 20. Pierre Mignoni, 21. Gérald Merceron

26 June 2002

Australia A	37–34	France XV

Central Coast Stadium, Gosford

29 June 2002

Australia	31–25	France
Try: Burke; Herbert; Mortlock (2); Con: Mortlock; Pen: Burke; Mortlock; Drop: Gregan		Try: Marconnet; Rougerie (2); Con: Merceron (2); Pen: Merceron (2)

Stadium Australia, Sydney
Referee: Paul Honiss (New Zealand)

Team details

Australia: 15. Chris Latham, 14. Wendell Sailor, 13. Matt Burke, 12. Dan Herbert, 11. Stirling Mortlock, 10. Stephen Larkham, 9. George Gregan (c), 8. David Lyons, 7. George Smith, 6. Owen Finegan (yellow card) , 5. Justin Harrison, 4. Nathan Sharpe, 3. Patricio Noriega, 2. Brendan Cannon, 1. Bill Young, – Replacements: 16. Sean Hardman, 17.Rod Moore, 18. Dan Vickerman, 19. Matt Cockbain, 21. Elton Flatley, 22. Mat Rogers – Unused: 20. Chris Whitaker
France: 15. Nicolas Brusque, 14. Aurélien Rougerie, 13. Tony Marsh, 12. Damien Traille, 11. Pepito Elhorga, 10. Gérald Merceron, 9. Frédéric Michalak, 8. Imanol Harinordoquy, 7. Sébastien Chabal, 6. Serge Betsen, 5. Olivier Brouzet, 4. Fabien Pelous, 3. Sylvain Marconnet, 2. Raphaël Ibañez (c), 1. Jean-Jacques Crenca, – Replacements: 17. Jean-Baptiste Poux, 18. Christophe Porcu, 19. Olivier Magne, 20. Pierre Mignoni, 21. Yannick Jauzion, 22. Cédric Heymans – Unused: 16. Olivier Azam
