= 2006 Heineken Cup final =

2006 Heineken Cup Final
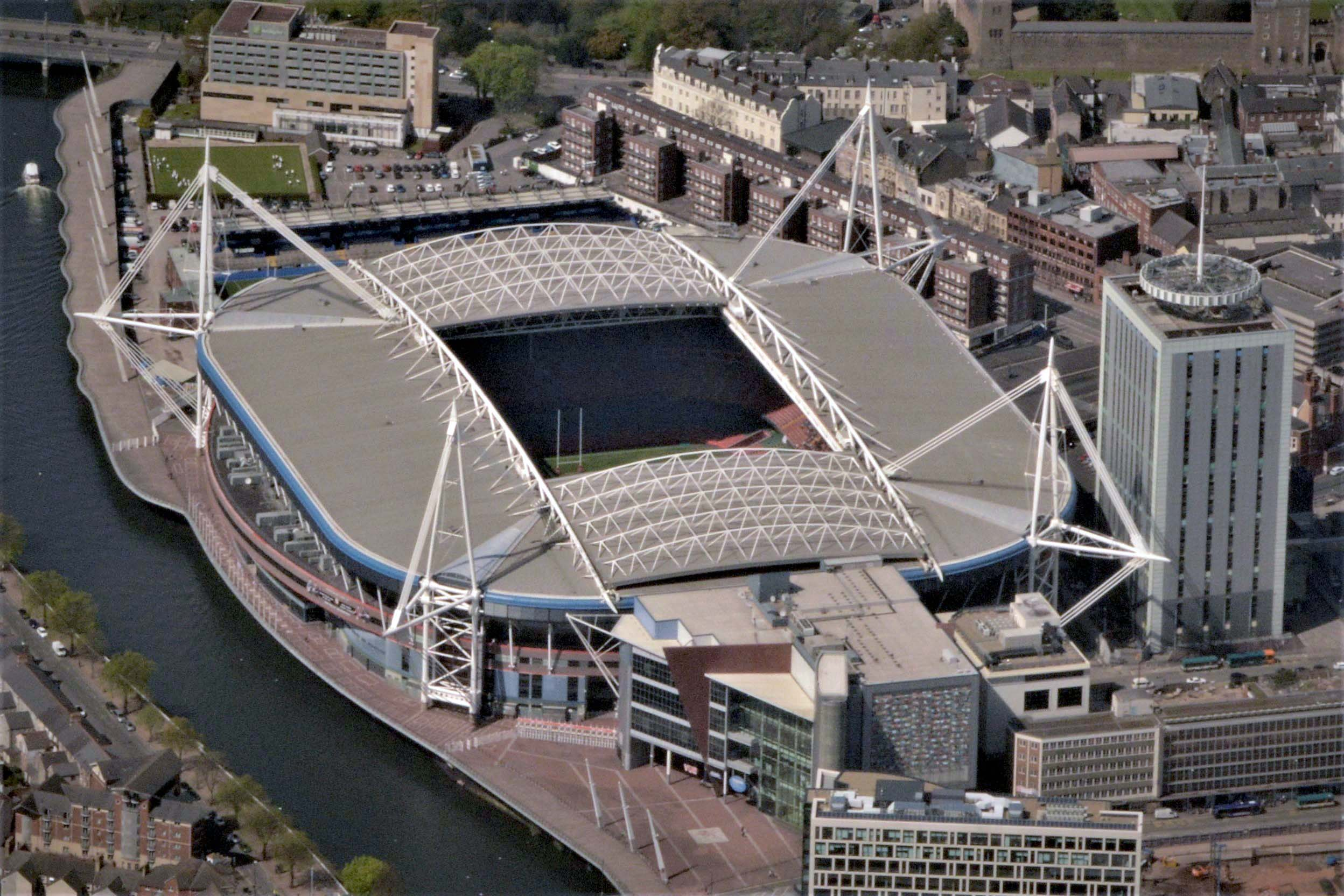
- The match was played at the Millennium Stadium in Cardiff.
- Event: 2005–06 Heineken Cup
Munster	Biarritz
(Ireland)	(France)
23	19
- Date: 20 May 2006
- Venue: Millennium Stadium, Cardiff
- Man of the Match: Peter Stringer (Munster)
- Referee: Chris White (England)
- Attendance: 74,534

The 2006 Heineken Cup Final was a rugby union match played at the Millennium Stadium in Cardiff, Wales, on 20 May 2006, to determine the winners of the 2005–06 Heineken Cup, European rugby's premier club competition. The match was contested by Irish province Munster and French side Biarritz. It was the 11th Heineken Cup final overall and the third final appearance for Munster (their first since 2002, when they lost 15–9 to Leicester Tigers), while Biarritz were competing in their first final. It was the second time the Millennium Stadium had hosted the Heineken Cup final, the other being in 2002, and the fourth to take place in Cardiff, including finals played at the old Cardiff Arms Park.

Each team needed to progress through the group stage and two knockout rounds to reach the final, playing nine matches in total. Biarritz and Munster each won their respective groups to qualify for the quarter-finals. Biarritz then beat Sale Sharks in the quarter-finals and Bath in the semis, while Munster beat Perpignan in their quarter-final and fellow Irish province Leinster in their semi. Chris White, representing the Rugby Football Union, was the referee for the match, which was played under a closed roof in front of 74,534 spectators.

Biarritz scored first through a Sireli Bobo try, converted by Dimitri Yachvili, in the 2nd minute. Munster scored a penalty goal through Ronan O'Gara in the 7th minute and took the lead 10 minutes later, when Trevor Halstead scored a try that was converted by O'Gara. Yachvili scored a penalty for Biarritz to level the match at 10–10, before Munster scored their second try courtesy of Peter Stringer (again converted by O'Gara) to give them a 17–10 half-time lead. In the second half, O'Gara extended Munster's lead to 10 points with his second penalty of the game, but Yachvili reduced Biarritz's deficit to one point with three unanswered penalties in the space of 22 minutes; however, another penalty for O'Gara in the 73rd minute pushed Munster further back in front. There were no further scores, giving Munster a 23–19 win and their first Heineken Cup title.

== Background ==
The Heineken Cup, the premier club competition of European rugby, was established by the Five Nations Committee in 1995 as a new competition for professional rugby clubs across Europe. Its first 10 seasons were dominated by English and French clubs, who won 9 of the 10 titles, Ulster the sole Irish victors in 1999. In 2005–06, the participating teams were drawn from the English Premiership, the Irish/Scottish/Welsh Celtic League, the Italian Super 10 and the French Top 14 based on their domestic performance the previous season. In the 10 previous Heineken Cup finals, the only previous meeting between an Irish side and a French one was in Ulster's 21–6 win over Colomiers. This was Munster's third final in the competition and their first since 2002, when they lost 15–9 to Leicester Tigers. They had also lost 9–8 to another English side, Northampton Saints, in the 2000 final. Meanwhile, Biarritz were appearing in their first Heineken Cup final and were thus also aiming to win their first Heineken Cup. The two teams had met each other twice before in the competition; Munster had won their first encounter in the competition 38–29 in the quarter-finals of the 2000–01 Heineken Cup, while Biarritz won the other match at the same stage of the 2004–05 tournament. Approximately 15,000 Munster fans watched the match on a giant screen in O'Connell Street, Limerick.

== Route to the final ==
The 2005–06 Heineken Cup featured 24 teams from England, Wales, Scotland, Ireland, France and Italy, who were drawn into six groups of four teams each. Teams were awarded four points for a win and two for a draw, with bonuses awarded to teams scoring four of more tries, and/or losing by seven or fewer points. The winners of each of the six groups as well as the two highest-placed runners-up qualified for the quarter-finals. The knockout stage then progressed as a single-elimination tournament.

=== Biarritz ===
Biarritz were drawn into Pool 4 with Italian club Benetton Treviso, English side Saracens and Ulster from Ireland. Their campaign started with a 22–10 loss away to Saracens at Vicarage Road on 23 October 2005, but they responded with a bonus-point victory at home to Ulster at Parc des Sports Aguiléra six days later, winning 33–19 to go top of the pool. Two more bonus-point wins in back-to-back games against Benetton followed in December, winning 34–7 on matchday 3 with the bonus point secured shortly after half-time, before scoring six tries in the reverse fixture at Stadio Comunale di Monigo six days later as they won 38–24. On matchday 5, Biarritz faced Ulster at Ravenhill; Biarritz won 24–8 to end Ulster's run of 14 matches without defeat at home. In the final pool match at home to Saracens eight days later, Biarritz against scored six tries to win 43–13 and guarantee a place in the quarter-finals as pool winners.

Due to Heineken Cup regulations that knockout matches had to be played at a neutral venue, Biarritz's quarter-final against Sale Sharks on 2 April was played at the Anoeta Stadium in San Sebastián. A penalty goal by Dimitri Yachvili gave Biarritz the lead midway through the first half. Charlie Hodgson equalised for Sale five minutes later, only for Yachvili to restore Biarritz's lead moments later. A try from Sireli Bobo gave the home side an 11–3 lead at half-time. Hodgson scored a second penalty for Sale with five minutes left to play, but Biarritz held on to win 11–6 and qualify for the semi-finals. As Biarritz were the higher-seeded team in the semi-finals, their match against Bath was again played at the Anoeta but this time in wet conditions. Yachvili scored two penalties in the first 16 minutes, before Chris Malone pulled one back for Bath. The pair then scored another penalty each to give Biarritz a 9–6 lead at the end of the first half, and they increased their advantage to nine points in the first five minutes of the second half via another Yachvili penalty and a drop goal from Damien Traille. Malone kicked a third penalty for Bath in the 64th minute, but Yachvili restored Bath's lead two minutes from the end, giving them an 18–9 win and a place in their first Heineken Cup final.

=== Munster ===
Munster were drawn in Pool 1 with French side Castres, Newport Gwent Dragons from Wales and English club Sale Sharks. Like Biarritz, Munster began away from home against English opposition; at Edgeley Park in Stockport on 21 October 2005, Munster led 13–9 after 47 minutes, but second-half tries from Sililo Martens and Jason Robinson, and two penalties from Charlie Hodgson gave Sale a 27–13 win. A week later, Munster recorded a bonus-point 42–16 win at home to Castres at Thomond Park in Limerick to maintain their 21-match unbeaten run there in the Heineken Cup. Munster picked up another win in the first of their back-to-back games against the Dragons at Rodney Parade on 10 December, although they missed out on the try-scoring bonus point in the 24–8 victory. In the return game at Thomond Park the following week, the Dragons had an 18–17 lead going into the final 15 minutes, but two penalties from Ronan O'Gara and a try by Jerry Flannery in the final minute gave Munster a 30–18 win, although they again missed out on the bonus point. However, that was not a problem in the game against Castres at Stade Pierre-Antoine on 13 January 2006, when they scored seven tries, including two each for Paul O'Connell and Tomás O'Leary, to win 46–9. Munster went into their final match at home to Sale five points behind the visitors in the pool, needing to record a bonus-point victory and also deny Sale a losing bonus point to top the pool and guarantee qualification for the quarter-finals. Victory was practically assured by half-time, as Munster took a 24–9 lead through tries from Anthony Foley, Ian Dowling and Barry Murphy, but the second half looked to be scoreless until two minutes past the regulation 80, when David Wallace scored the fourth try they needed to overtake Sale and win both the game and the pool.

As the fourth-seeded team from the pool stage, Munster were given a home draw in their quarter-final against Perpignan on 1 April, which was played at Lansdowne Road in Dublin due to the competition's neutral venue regulations. Munster took the lead midway through the first half after O'Gara converted O'Connell's try, but Perpignan wing Matthieu Bourret converted his own try and added a penalty for the away side to give them a 10–7 half-time lead; however, four penalties from O'Gara in the space of 27-second-half minutes gave Munster a 19–10 win and put them into the semi-finals for the sixth time in seven seasons. Munster's semi-final opponents were Leinster, who had home advantage after knocking out the top-seeded team, Toulouse, in the quarters, meaning Munster returned to Lansdowne Road. They had a 16–3 lead at half-time, thanks to a try from Denis Leamy and three penalties from O'Gara, while Leinster's only points came from the boot of Felipe Contepomi. The Argentine was again on target in the 71st minute, but late tries from O'Gara and Trevor Halstead gave Munster a 30–6 victory and a place in their third Heineken Cup final.

== Match ==
=== Background ===
In May 2005, European Rugby Cup (ERC), the organisers of the Heineken Cup, awarded the right to host the 2006 final to the Millennium Stadium in Cardiff, Wales. It was the second time the stadium had hosted the Heineken Cup final and the fourth time in eleven years it had been staged in Cardiff. (Note: The other two finals that were staged in Cardiff were at Cardiff Arms Park in 1996 and 1997.) The Millennium Stadium had previously hosted the 2002 final between Tigers and Munster. The referee for the match was Chris White representing the Rugby Football Union (RFU). The 42-year-old became the first referee to take charge of three Heineken Cup finals, having officiated the 2003 and 2005 editions. White's assistants were touch judges Dave Pearson and Tony Spreadbury also representing the RFU. The television match official was the RFU's Geoff Warren and the citing commissioner was Bill Dunlop. Both clubs received a ticket allocation of 7,650 distributable by both sides from a total of 73,300. Tickets for adults were priced at £15, £25, £35 and £45 with concessions. Munster received an extra allocation of almost 3,000 tickets in early May 2006 to accommodate an increase of stadium capacity by 600 seats. A total of 48,000 were sold to the general public, 4,100 were distributed through the ERC's partners and 2,900 were sold as general hospitality packages.

Munster captain Anthony Foley said his team had "no divine right" to win the final and they would treat it as a normal fixture with "a 50–50 chance" of victory. Lock Paul O'Connell said Munster would not alter their approach and would play with the same mindset they had in the previous rounds. He said the team were "ridiculously motivated" to win the final. O'Gara dismissed criticisms of Biarritz's style of play, saying: "I don't buy into this notion that they are a dour side." Munster coach Declan Kidney commented the fixture had "all the makings of a great game" and his club's sole option was to pay attention to themselves: "It is a pretty daunting task coming up against a side like Biarritz, and you never really know how it is going to pan out – it is just a brilliant opportunity for everyone involved."

Fly-half Julien Peyrelongue said Biarritz were ready to win their first Heineken Cup: "The objective was to be at top form on May 20 and that's what we will achieve. Since February we have been working hard physically to reach that level. We now have experience and the composure to cope with highly-pressured matches like this one." Damien Traille predicted a physical, intemperate match that would be won on finer details, adding: "we also have to perform better man for man and we have to take advantage of everything, even if we are only gaining centimetres at a time." Biarritz coach Patrice Lagisquet stated his side's recent league victory over Montpellier better prepared them to play Munster: "The fight that is awaiting us in Cardiff will be extremely difficult. The most important will be to remain concentrated and serious."

Biarritz captain and hooker Benoît August was reported by citing commissioner John West for a purported eye-gouging on Danny Grewcock in the team's semi-final with Bath. The offence would have seen August banned anywhere between three months to two years but a disciplinary hearing deemed the complaint invalid since the citing commissioner and the match referee were not from separate countries as dictated by ERC tournament rules, clearing him for selection. Both teams announced their starting lineups on 19 May. Christian Cullen was ruled unfit to play for Munster due to an ankle injury he sustained in a Celtic League match not healing sufficiently for him to play. Mike Mullins was also unavailable due to injury. Munster named Marcus Horan, John Kelly and O'Connell to the starting lineup despite all three players sustaining injuries. Federico Pucciariello was placed on reserve if Horan was deemed unfit, while Rob Henderson would replace Kelly if the latter could not play. Biarritz reported no injury worries. Thomas Lièvremont returned to play at number eight after missing Biarritz's semi-final with Bath due to injury, replacing Thierry Dusautoir.

=== First half ===
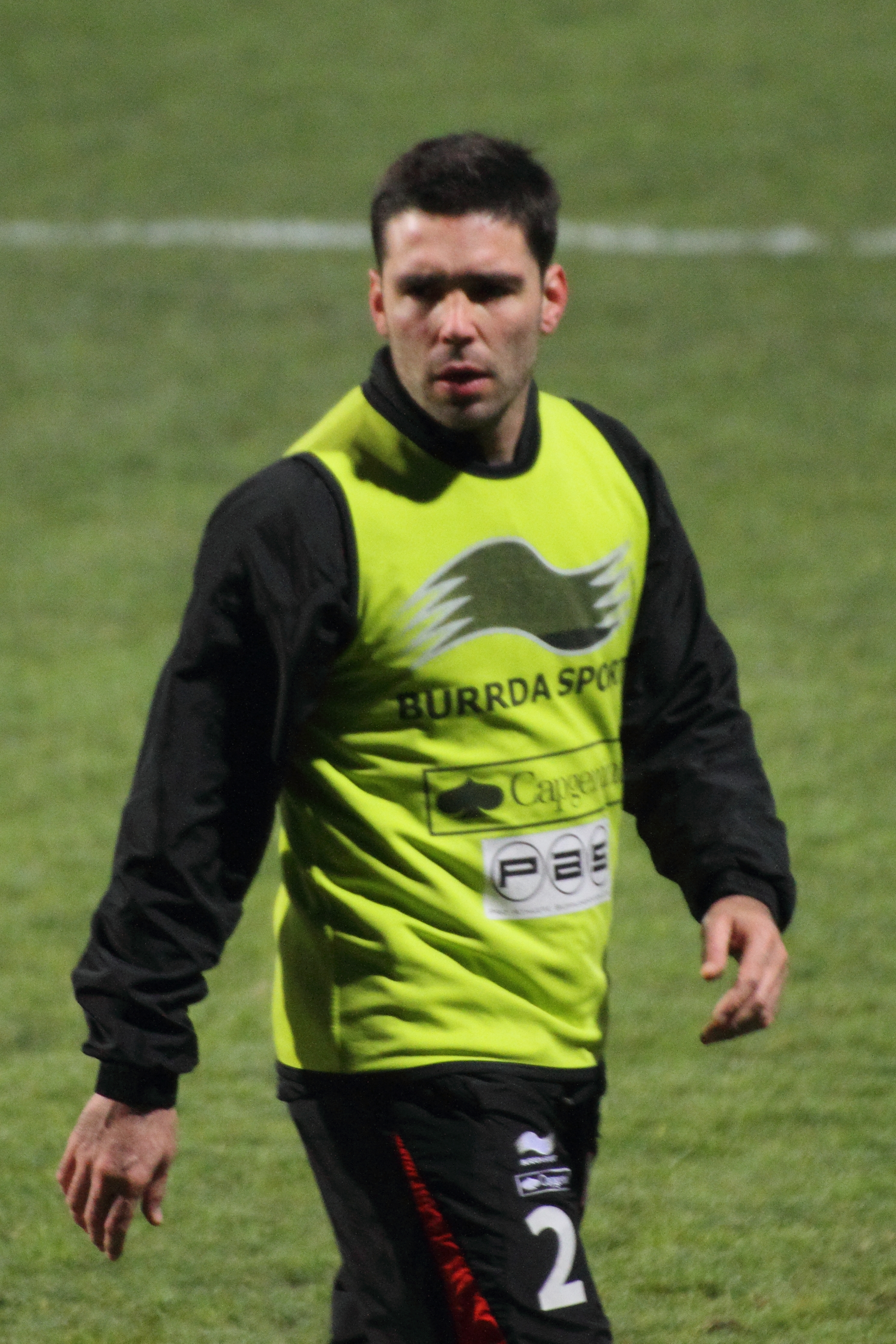
Dimitri Yachvili scored four penalties and a conversion for Biarritz

The match kicked off at 15:00 local time on 20 May 2006, in front of a Millennium Stadium crowd of 74,534 under a closed roof. Biarritz won possession at the start but August made a weak throw allowing David Wallace to win a line-out for Munster from which was cleared by O'Gara. In the second minute, Philippe Bidabé released himself from Kelly's grip and passed to Bobo. He ran to the left-hand corner and scored a try for Biarritz. The try was awarded by White following a review by touch judge Pearson despite broadcast replays observing Bobo's feet to be on the touchline and therefore in touch. Yachvili successfully kicked the conversion from the far left touchline to give Biarritz a 7–0 lead. On six minutes, Bobo looked set to score his second try after laching onto a crossfield kick by O'Gara but Biarritz were adjudged to be offside. From the left-hand side, O'Gara successfully kicked the penalty for Munster to reduce Biarritz's lead to 7–3 in the seventh minute. Shaun Payne was ruled to be in touch by Spreadbury and thus Biarritz were awarded a line-out. In the 12th minute, Serge Betsen was penalised for foul play in a scrum and White reprimanded him. Munster were awarded a penalty, but Foley called for O'Gara to kick for touch instead of going for goal.

Munster were awarded another penalty after 14 minutes but O'Gara again decided against taking it and put the ball into the corner. Traille took possession of the ball and White had to separate him and O'Gara. On 17 minutes, Leamy found space to pass the ball to Halstead, who went past Bidabé and Jean-Baptiste Gobelet to score a try for Munster from short distance in the right-hand corner. The try was successfully converted by O'Gara whose shot from the touchline in the 18th minute went through the goal posts to give Munster a 10–7 lead. On 21 minutes, Peter Stringer injured his back and received medical treatment to continue playing. A collapsed scrum caused by Munster gave Biarritz a penalty kick. Yachvili successfully kicked the penalty to level the match at 10–10. Seven minutes later, Yachvili passed the ball to Gobelet following a line-out from 15 m (49 ft). Gobelet looked set to score Biarritz's second try but Munster defended through the boot of Ian Dowling. Not long after, O'Gara fell with a shoulder injury for which he received treatment. Munster received a penalty but again chose not to score for three points before O'Gara kicked weakly. In the 31st minute, a scrum 15 m (49 ft) from the Biarritz touchline saw Stringer collect the ball and look to his left. Stringer ran unopposed at an angle around the back of the scrum and scored Munster's second try. The try was again converted by O'Gara in the 32nd minute but no further points were scored thereafter and the first half ended 17–10 to Munster.

=== Second half ===
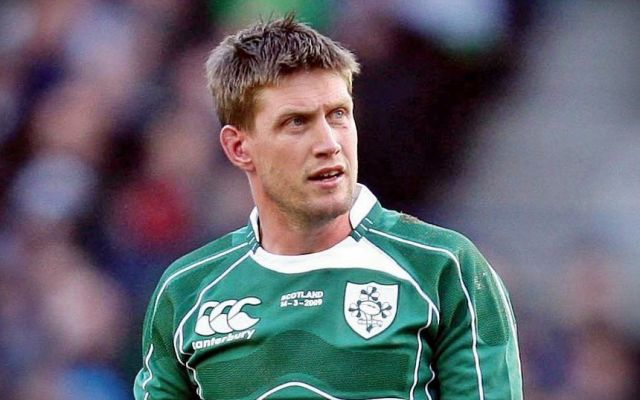
Ronan O'Gara contributed to Munster's victory with three penalties and two conversions.

O'Gara got the second half underway, and two minutes later Munster were awarded a penalty after White observed Biarritz not releasing the ball following a second high throw by Stringer. O'Gara successfully scored the penalty on 42 minutes to give Munster a 20–10 lead. Biarritz made the match's first substitution in the 45th minute, replacing David Couzinet with Olivier Olibeau. Biarritz were awarded a penalty when Hayes went offside to stop a Biarritz player gathering the ball on 47 minutes. Yachvili scored the penalty in the 48th minute to reduce Munster's lead to seven points. Two minutes later, another penalty was awarded to Biarritz after Leamy high-tackled Imanol Harinordoquy. The penalty was successfully scored by Yachvili to further decrease Munster's advantage to four points. Biarritz made a double substitution in each of the 52nd and 53rd minutes with Dusautoir replacing the injured Lièvremont and Federico Martín Aramburú coming on for the injured Traille.

On 58 minutes, Betsen was penalised for not releasing Payne in a tackle, earning Munster a penalty. A weak shot from O'Gara resulted in Peyrelongue kicking the ball up the field and won Munster a line-out. In the 63rd minute, Benoît Lecouls substituted Census Johnston at Biarritz while Munster replaced Horan with Pucciariello. In the 67th minute Biarritz replaced August with Benjamin Noirot for the remainder of the match. Biarritz were awarded a penalty two minutes later when Foley committed a foul. On 70 minutes, Yachvili attempted a kick at goal and was successful at his fourth attempt to put Biarritz 20–19 behind. Two minutes later, Johnston illegally entered a ruck from the side, earning Munster a penalty. O'Gara kicked from almost 40 m (130 ft) to score a third penalty and restore Munster's four-point advantage in the 73rd minute. Three minutes later, O'Connell sustained an injury and was replaced by Alan Quinlan. Biarritz's final attack ended in conceding a scrum to Munster for accidental offside. As the clock passed 80 minutes, Munster were awarded a penalty for an infringement by Biarritz at that scrum. Stringer immediately kicked the ball directly into touch, allowing the referee to blow the final whistle and give Munster a 23–19 victory for their first Heineken Cup.

=== Details ===
Biarritz	Munster

20 May 2006
15:00 BST

Biarritz (France)	19–23	(Ireland) Munster
Try: Bobo 2' c Con: Yachvili; Pen: Yachvili (4) 22', 48', 51', 70'		Try: Halstead 17' c Stringer 31' c Con: O'Gara (2); Pen: O'Gara (3) 7', 42', 73'

Millennium Stadium, Cardiff
Attendance: 74,534
Referee: Chris White (England)

FB	15	(France) Nicolas Brusque
RW	14	(France) Jean-Baptiste Gobelet
OC	13	(France) Philippe Bidabé
IC	12	(France) Damien Traille	(substituted off) 53'
LW	11	(Fiji) Sireli Bobo
FH	10	(France) Julien Peyrelongue
SH	9	(France) Dimitri Yachvili
N8	8	(France) Thomas Lièvremont (c)	(substituted off) 52'
OF	7	(France) Imanol Harinordoquy
BF	6	(France) Serge Betsen
RL	5	(France) David Couzinet	(substituted off) 45'
LL	4	(France) Jérôme Thion
TP	3	(Samoa) Census Johnston	(substituted off) 63' (substituted on) 74'
HK	2	(France) Benoît August	(substituted off) 67'
LP	1	(Romania) Petru Bălan		(substituted off) 74'
Replacements:
HK	16	(France) Benjamin Noirot	(substituted on) 67'
PR	17	(France) Benoît Lecouls	(substituted on) 63'
N8	18	(France) Olivier Olibeau	(substituted on) 45'
FL	19	(France) Thierry Dusautoir	(substituted on) 52'
LK	20	(Argentina) Manuel Carizza
FH	21	(France) Julien Dupuy
CE	22	(Argentina) Federico Martín Aramburú	(substituted on) 53'
Coach:
(France) Patrice Lagisquet

FB	15	(South Africa) Shaun Payne
RW	14	(Ireland) Anthony Horgan
OC	13	(Ireland) John Kelly
IC	12	(South Africa) Trevor Halstead
LW	11	(Ireland) Ian Dowling
FH	10	(Ireland) Ronan O'Gara
SH	9	(Ireland) Peter Stringer
N8	8	(Ireland) Anthony Foley (c)	(substituted off) 71'
OF	7	(Ireland) David Wallace
BF	6	(Ireland) Denis Leamy
RL	5	(Ireland) Paul O'Connell	(substituted off) 76'
LL	4	(Ireland) Donncha O'Callaghan
TP	3	(Ireland) John Hayes
HK	2	(Ireland) Jerry Flannery
LP	1	(Ireland) Marcus Horan	(substituted off) 63'
Replacements:
HK	16	(Ireland) Denis Fogarty
PR	17	(Italy) Federico Pucciariello	(substituted on) 63'
LK	18	(Ireland) Mick O'Driscoll	(substituted on) 71'
FL	19	(Ireland) Alan Quinlan	(substituted on) 76'
SH	20	(Ireland) Tomás O'Leary
FH	21	(Ireland) Jeremy Manning
CE	22	(Ireland) Rob Henderson
Coach:
(Ireland) Declan Kidney

Man of the Match:
Peter Stringer (Munster)

Touch judges
Dave Pearson (England)
Tony Spreadbury (England)
Television match official
Geoff Warren (England)
Citing commissioner
Bill Dunlop (Scotland)

=== Statistics ===
Statistics
	Biarritz	Munster
Tries	1	2
Conversions	1	2
Penalties	4/4	3/3
Penalties conceded	10	6
Drop goals	0	0
Scrums won	8/8	8/9
Lineouts won	14/16	23/26
Turnovers conceded	11	8

== Post-match ==
The Heineken Cup trophy was lifted by Munster captain Foley after the match. Kindey said Munster losing in the Heineken Cup final twice before helped inspire them to win: "This bunch of guys have had tough experiences over the years but have tried to learn every time they have lost." His counterpart Lagisquet was sanguine: "I regret that we gave Munster a lot of gifts, especially at the five-meter scrum they scored from. We can't be too disappointed with the second half as Munster played with such high intensity." He admitted Munster deserved to win the final. Foley felt Munster's fans in the stadium motivated the club, adding: "I've been in a ground twice when the opposition's captain has lifted the trophy. To be the one to go up there and pick up the silverware is a great feeling." Yachvili emphasised the importance of scoring quickly but acknowledged Biarritz did not put enough pressure onto Munster and did not do not enough in attacking, saying: "We always thought we could win – we lost by only four points so it was not so far away. But they were very organised and did not make any mistakes." Lièvremont felt the deciding moment of the final was Halstead's 17th-minute try for Munster, adding: "We saw Munster were getting more and more tired. If we could have forced them into committing errors at the end there was a chance we could have snatched it." Mary McAleese, the Irish president, conveyed a tribute to Munster during a visit of the United States.

Stringer was named man of the match. L'Équipe insisted Munster defeating Biarritz would have given the losing club no shame and singled out both fans as providing inspiration during the match: "When their players were in trouble, their red army burst into their hymn, The Fields of Athenry. Munster were not on their own – they won with the help of their whole country." Le Parisien credited Munster's players for their side's victory and gave its analysis of the fixture: "The dream is over for Biarritz. The French club, who tried everything and pulled out all the stops, at the end of the match eventually lost the final at the hands of Munster, who were clearly fitter and more experienced than the Basques." Tim Glover of The Independent suggested it "would have been cruel had Munster and their magnificent supporters not taken possession of the Heineken Cup". Tom English of Scotland on Sunday asked "Can anybody with even a passing interest in the game be unaware of their struggle? Doubtful. Can anybody who witnessed it be unmoved by it? Not a chance."

On the day after the final, the Munster team returned to Limerick to celebrate their achievement and were greeted by an estimated 40,000 supporters. A civic reception was held at Limerick City Hall that day. The ERC announced on 29 May that Biarritz had lodged a formal complaint with them over the television coverage of the final. It stated Sky Television broadcast live footage of the large crowd of Munster supporters in Limerick on two large video screens inside the Millennium Stadium on two critical occasions, which they felt had provided Munster with an unfair advantage. Biarritz however accepted there was no possibility of the result being changed.

== Legacy ==
In 2016, Daily Telegraph writer Steve James included the final at number five in his list of "Top 10 European rugby finals". The match was included in Sky Sports' "most memorable European showpiece games down the years", and Cian Tracey for the Irish Independent named it his "most favourite game" in a 2020 article for the newspaper. It was rebroadcast by Sky Sports on 17 October 2016 in tribute to Foley who had died that weekend.
