= 1999 European Challenge Cup final =

1999 European Challenge Cup Final
- Event: 1998–99 European Challenge Cup
Bourgoin	Montferrand
(France)	(France)
16	35
- Date: 27 February 1999
- Venue: Stade de Gerland, Lyon
- Referee: Joel Dumé (France)
- Attendance: 31,986

The 1999 European Challenge Cup Final was the final match of the 1998–99 European Challenge Cup, the third season of Europe's second-tier club rugby union competition. The match was played on 27 February 1999 at Stade de Gerland in Lyon.

The match was contested by Bourgoin and Montferrand, who are both from France. Montferrand won the match 35–16; outscoring Bourgoin 2 tries to 1. Montferrand tries came from Jimmy Marlu and Christophe Larrue, while Bourgoin's sole try came from Scottish center James McLaren.

== Match details ==
27 February 1999

Bourgoin (France)	16 – 35	(France) Montferrand
Try: McLaren; Con: Boyet (1); Pen: Boyet (2); Drop: Boyet (1)	Report	Try: Penalty try Marlu; Larrue; Con: Merceron (1); Pen: Merceron (6)

Stade de Gerland
Attendance: 31,986
Referee: Joel Dumé (France)

== See also ==
- 1998–99 European Challenge Cup
