= Jimmy Marlu =

French rugby union player (born 1977)

- Born: 25 May 1977 (age 49) Saint-Joseph, Martinique
- Height: 1.80 m (5 ft 11 in)
- Weight: 89 kg (196 lb)

Rugby union career
- Position(s): Fullback, Wing
Senior career
Years	Team	Apps	(Points)
- RC Massy
1996-2003	AS Montferrand		
2003-2008	Biarritz		
2008-	Bordeaux		
International career
Years	Team	Apps	(Points)
1998-2005	France	4	(0)

Jimmy Marlu (born 25 May 1977) is a retired French rugby union player. His usual positions was Fullback but he also played Wing.

He played for AS Montferrand where he won the European Challenge Cup. He made his debut for France in a match against Fiji in Suva. He was selected for the 1999 Rugby World Cup but he did not play in any matches. In 2003 he left Clermont for Biarritz where he won two Top 14.

== Honour ==
- ASM Clermont Auvergne
  - European Challenge Cup (1999)
  - Coupe de France (2001)
  - Challenge Yves du Manoir (2001)
  - Top 14 (1999 and 2001 finalist)
- Biarritz Olympique
  - Heineken Cup (2006 finalist)
  - Top 14 (2000 and 2006)
- France
  - Grand Slam (2002)
