= Alessandro Moscardi =

Italian former rugby union player

Alessandro Moscardi (born 26 March 1969) is an Italian former rugby union player who played as a hooker.

Moscardi was born in Rovigo, Veneto. He played for Rugby Rovigo Delta, from 1988/89 to 1995/96, where he won the Italian Championship, in 1989/90. He moved to Benetton Rugby Treviso, where he played from 1996/97 to 2002/03. He won five Italian Championship titles, in 1996/97, 1997/98, 1998/99, 2001/01 and 2002/03, and the Cup of Italy, in 1997/98. He spent his final season, as an amateur, at Conigliano, in 2003/04, finishing his player career afterwards.

He had 44 caps for Italy, from 1993 to 2002, including 17 as captain, scoring 6 tries, 30 points on aggregate. He had his first cap at the 33-11 win over Portugal, at 17 April 1993, in Coimbra, for the 1992–93 FIRA Preliminary Tournament. He was called for the 1999 Rugby World Cup, playing in three games and scoring a try. In the Autumn of 2000 he was made captain by coach Brad Johnstone. He played in three Six Nations Championship competitions, from 2000 to 2002, without scoring. His last cap was at the 2002 Six Nations Championship, in the 45-9 loss to England, at 7 April 2002, in Rome, aged 33 years old.
