= David Bory =

French rugby union player (born 1976)

- Born: 8 March 1976 (age 50) Vichy, France
- Height: 5 ft 11 in (1.80 m)
- Weight: 191 lb (87 kg)

Rugby union career
- Position: Wing
Senior career
Years	Team	Apps	(Points)
1994-2004	Clermont		
2004-2005	Castre	21	(10)
2005-2007	Bath	39	(35)
2007-2008	CA Brive	4	(0)
International career
Years	Team	Apps	(Points)
2000-2003	France	18	(10)

David Bory (born 8 March 1976 in Vichy) is a retired French international rugby union player.

He spent most of his career playing for the Clermont and moved to the Castres Olympique in the French Top 14 club competition in 2004. The next year he left France for Bath. Bory played on the wing for France. He was named to replace Xavier Garbajosa after Garbajosa blew out a knee during the 2003 Rugby World Cup.
