= Arnaud Martinez =

France international rugby union player (born 1976)

- Born: 24 February 1976 (age 50) Narbonne, France
- Height: 6 ft 1 in (185 cm)
- Weight: 255 lb (116 kg)

Rugby union career
- Position: Prop
International career
Years	Team	Apps	(Points)
2002–04	France	2	(0)

Arnaud Martinez (born 24 February 1976) is a French former rugby union international.

Martinez, a prop from Cuxac-d'Aude in southern France, played his club rugby for RC Narbonne. He was a member of the RC Narbonne team which lost the 2000–01 European Challenge Cup final to Harlequins.

Capped twice for France, Martinez debuted on the 2002 tour of Australia, where he played in the first of two Tests, at Docklands Stadium in Melbourne. His only other Test appearance came against Canada in Toronto in 2004.

== See also ==
- List of France national rugby union players
