= Nick Duncombe =

English rugby union player

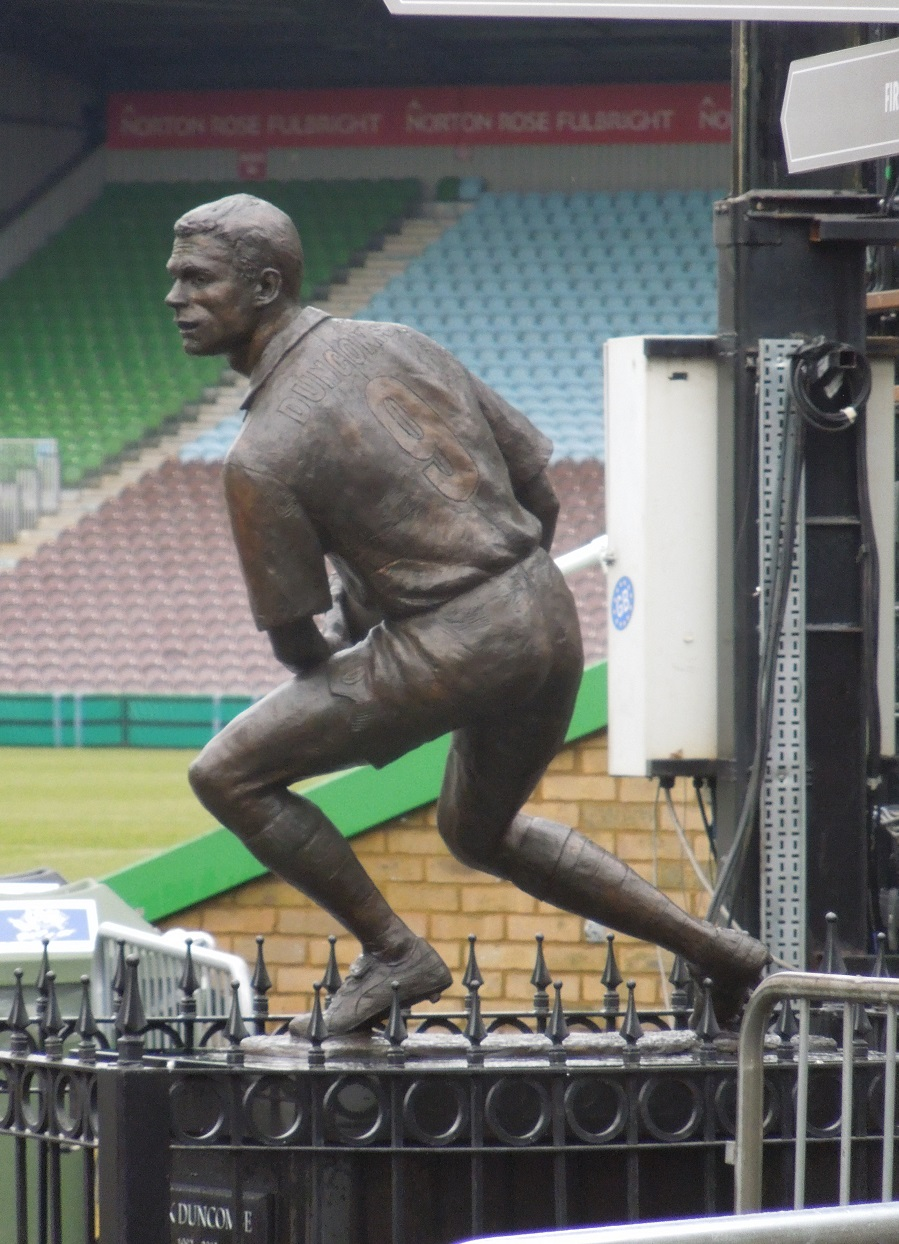
Memorial statue of the late Nick Duncombe, at The Stoop

Nick Duncombe (21 January 1982 – 14 February 2003) was an English rugby union player who played for Harlequins and England. Duncombe was the England senior team's youngest debutant scrum-half at the time of his debut and won two international caps before his death at age 21.

== Biography ==
Duncombe attended the Royal Grammar School, High Wycombe, which was known for its rugby tradition. At school, he excelled in various sports including cricket and football and began playing for the England national youth teams and England Schoolboys. A neck injury he sustained during an England youth game in 2000 nearly ended his career but he recovered.

== Career ==
Duncombe initially played for the Saracens' youth squads before joining Harlequins. He made his professional debut in 2002.

On 2 February 2002 Clive Woodward gave Duncombe his England début as a half-time replacement for the injured Kyran Bracken against Scotland at Murrayfield. Selection came after having played just 270 minutes of senior rugby for Harlequins' first XV – and just 12 days after his 20th birthday – making him England's youngest scrum half of the professional era. He earned his second cap in the next fixture against Ireland on 16 February 2002.

Duncombe also represented England in sevens at the 2002 Commonwealth Games.

== Death ==
Duncombe contracted meningitis while on a training trip to Lanzarote.

A statue of Duncombe is displayed at Harlequins' home ground, The Stoop. On the front of the statue, the plinth reads:

Nick Duncombe, 1982–2003. Harlequins & England. 'Carpe Diem'
