= Citing commissioner =

Rugby Union Official

In rugby union, a citing commissioner is an independent official, appointed by the competition organizer, the union in which the match is taking place, or World Rugby, who is responsible for citing players who commit foul play which is not detected by the match officials.

Teams may bring offences to the attention of the citing commissioner for review. The citing commissioner may cite a player even if the referee has already dealt with the issue (except where he has ordered a player from the field). When there is no citing commissioner, the teams participating in the match have the right to cite players, but may only cite a player for an infringement which the match officials have not dealt with.

A player who is cited is called to a hearing to show cause why he should not be treated as having been sent off for the alleged offence. Pending the hearing, a player cited by a citing commissioner (but not a team) is suspended from playing. The player is entitled to be represented. The hearing usually takes place before three independent persons nominated by the union or the competition organizer, and is generally convened within a week of the match in question. If the offence is proven, the panel issues a penalty, usually in the form of a suspension for a number of weeks.
