= 1998–99 European Challenge Cup =

European Rugby tournament

1998–1999 European Challenge Cup

Tournament details
- Countries: France; Ireland; Italy; Portugal; Romania; Spain; Wales
- Tournament format(s): Round-robin and Knockout
- Date: 19 September 1998 to 27 February 1999

Tournament statistics
- Teams: 21
- Top point scorer(s): Christophe Lamaison (Brive); Gérald Merceron (Montferrand) (109 points)
- Top try scorer(s): Renaud Calvel (Narbonne); Eremodo Tuni (Bourgoin) (7 tries)

Final
- Venue: Stade de Gerland
- Attendance: 31,986
- Champions: (France) AS Montferrand (1st title)
- Runners-up: (France) Bourgoin

The 1998–99 European Challenge Cup was the third year of the European Challenge Cup, the second tier rugby union cup competition below the Heineken Cup. The tournament was held between September 1998 and February 1999

== Pool stage ==
=== Pool 1 ===
Team	P	W	D	L	Tries for	Tries against	Try diff	Points for	Points against	Points diff	Pts
(France) Narbonne	6	6	0	0	32	13	+19	228	98	+130	12
(Wales) Caerphilly	6	4	0	2	16	19	−3	167	154	+13	8
(France) Périgueux	6	3	0	3	23	13	+10	168	119	+49	6
Racing Club de France	6	3	0	3	17	23	−6	127	184	−57	6
(Ireland) Connacht	6	3	0	3	16	19	−3	129	156	−27	6
(Wales) Newport	6	1	0	5	14	23	−9	123	183	−60	2
(Italy) Rugby Rovigo	6	1	0	5	12	20	−8	108	156	−48	2

=== Pool 2 ===
Team	P	W	D	L	Tries for	Tries against	Try diff	Points for	Points against	Points diff	Pts
(France) Montferrand	6	5	0	1	43	9	+34	303	86	+217	10
(France) Bourgoin	6	5	0	1	36	8	+28	222	86	+136	10
(France) Dax	6	5	0	1	20	15	+5	163	124	+39	10
(France) Castres	6	3	0	3	32	10	+22	229	101	+128	6
(Italy) Rugby Roma	6	2	0	4	14	34	−20	117	213	−96	4
(Wales) Aberavon	6	1	0	5	14	42	−28	86	287	−201	2
Spain XV	6	0	0	6	7	48	−41	65	288	−223	0

=== Pool 3 ===
Team	P	W	D	L	Tries for	Tries against	Try diff	Points for	Points against	Points diff	Pts
(France) Brive	6	5	0	1	35	14	+21	241	102	+139	10
(France) Agen	6	4	0	2	30	11	+19	231	93	+138	8
(France) Pau	6	4	0	2	25	8	+17	211	87	+124	8
(France) Biarritz	6	4	0	2	30	14	+16	187	124	+63	8
(Wales) Bridgend RFC	6	2	0	4	19	28	−9	158	206	−48	4
(Romania) Dinamo București	6	2	0	4	19	31	−12	131	246	−115	4
Portugal XV	6	0	0	6	8	60	−52	73	374	−301	0

== Knockout stage ==
=== Quarter-finals ===
12 December 1998
15:30

Narbonne (France)	30–13	(France) Pau

Parc des Sports et de l'Amitie

12 December 1998
19:30

Brive (France)	43–12	(Wales) Caerphilly

Parc Municipal des Sports
Attendance: 4,000

13 December 1998
15:00

Montferrand (France)	66–13	(France) Dax

Stade Marcel-Michelin
Attendance: 3,872

13 December 1998
15:00

Bourgoin (France)	29–19	(France) SU Agen

Stade Pierre Rajon
Attendance: 6,000

=== Semi-finals ===
10 January 1999
15:15

Montferrand (France)	27–21	(France) Narbonne

Stade Marcel-Michelin
Attendance: 10,500

10 January 1999
15:15

Bourgoin (France)	26–23	(France) Brive

Stade Pierre Rajon
Attendance: 12,000

=== Final ===
27 February 1999
16:00

Bourgoin (France)	16–35	(France) Montferrand

Stade de Gerland
Attendance: 31,986

== See also ==
- European Challenge Cup
- 1998–99 Heineken Cup
