= François Gelez =

French rugby union player (born 1979)

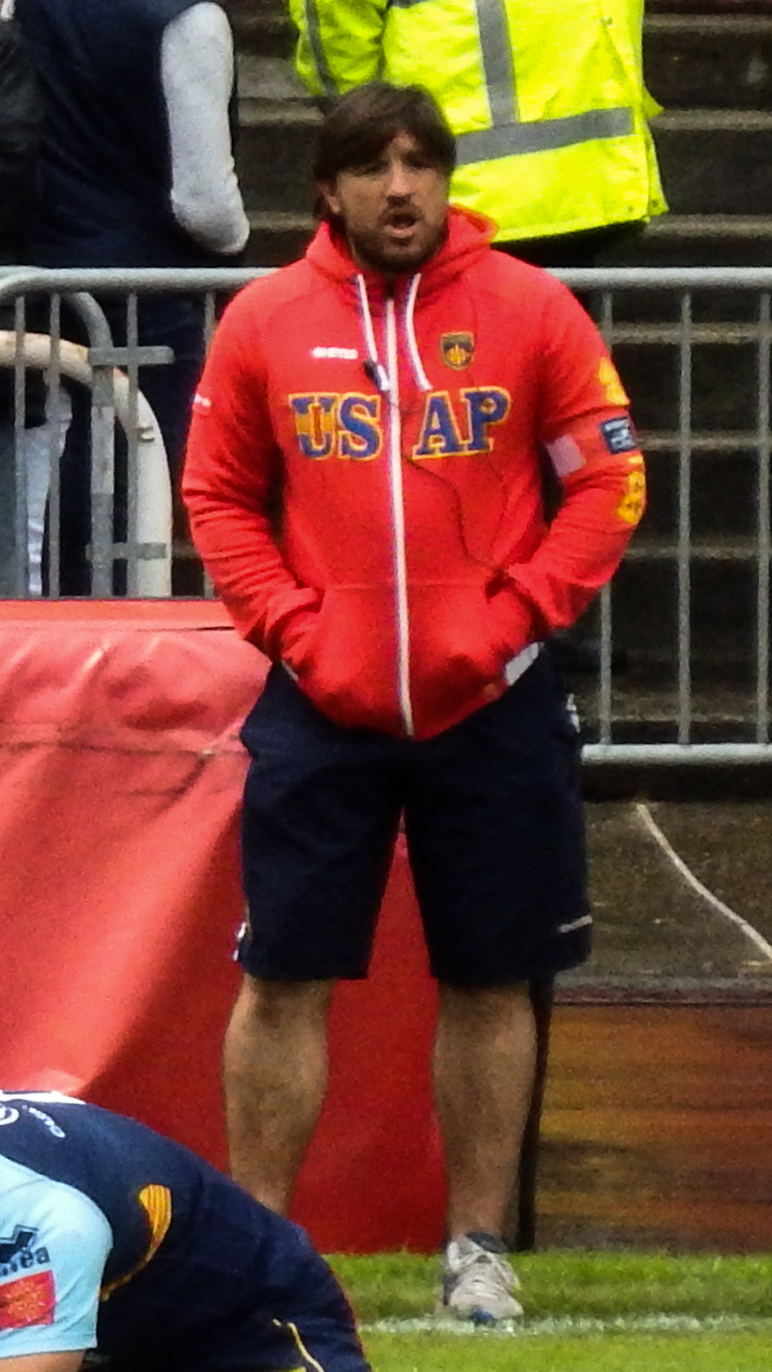
- Born: 15 January 1979 (age 47) Saint-Vincent-de-Tyrosse, Frabce
- Height: 1.80 m (5 ft 11 in)
- Weight: 84 kg (13 st 3 lb)

Rugby union career
- Position: Fly-half
Senior career
| Years | Team | Apps | (Points) |
| 1997–1999 | Tyrosse | | |
| 1999–2009 | Agen | | |
International career
| Years | Team | Apps | (Points) |
| 2001–2003 | France | 8 | (81) |

François Gelez (born 15 January 1979 in Tyrosse) is a former French international rugby union player, who previously played as a fly-half for SU Agen.

Gelez has played for France, making his debut on 10 November 2001 against South Africa. He was also part of the team that won the Grand Slam in 2002.
