= Steven Hall (rugby union) =

France international rugby union player (born 1972)

- Born: 18 March 1972 (age 54) Johannesburg, South Africa
- Height: 1.98 m (6 ft 6 in)
- Weight: 116 kg (18 st 4 lb)

Rugby union career
- Position(s): lock, number eight
Senior career
Years	Team	Apps	(Points)
?-2005	AS Béziers		
2005-2007	Aviron Bayonnais		
International career
Years	Team	Apps	(Points)
2002	France	2	(0)

Steven Hall (born 17 September 1972, in Johannesburg) is a former French rugby union player. He played as a lock and occasionally number eight.

He played for AS Béziers where he won Rugby Pro D2 in 2000. He earned his first cap with the French national team on 2 February 2002 against Italy at Stade de France. With the French national team he played as number eight.
