= Andy Marinos =

Wales international rugby union & league players (born 1972)

Personal information
- Full name: Andrew William Nicko Marinos
- Born: 13 November 1972 (age 53) Salisbury, Rhodesia (today Harare, Zimbabwe)

Playing information
- Height: 5 ft 10 in (178 cm)
- Weight: 15 st 1 lb (96 kg)

Rugby league
- Position: Centre
Club
Years	Team	Pld	T	G	FG	P
1996	Canterbury-Bankstown Bulldogs	1	0	0	0	0

Rugby union
- Position: Centre
Club
Years	Team	Pld	T	G	FG	P
	Stormers
1999–04	Newport GD	97	24	0	0	120
	Total	97	24	0	0	120
Representative
Years	Team	Pld	T	G	FG	P
2002–03	Wales	8	1	0	0	5

Andy Marinos is a Zimbabwean former rugby footballer who played rugby league and rugby union professionally and represented Wales at rugby union.

== Rugby league career ==
Marinos signed for Australian rugby league club the Sydney Bulldogs in 1996, playing in one match. In 1997, he represented South Africa at the Super League World Nines.

== Rugby union career ==
A centre, Marinos played for the Stormers, Newport RFC and the Newport Gwent Dragons. He also represented Wales.

== Administration ==
He later worked as the CEO of Rodney Parade, before returning to South Africa in 2005.

He was the CEO of SANZAAR, a rugby committee in charge of expanding and maintaining the game of rugby union in South Africa, New Zealand, Australia and Argentina since late 2015.

In December 2020 Marinos was announced as chief executive officer of Rugby Australia. He took over the position from interim CEO Rob Clarke in February 2021.
