= Nicolas Brusque =

France international rugby union player

- Born: Nicolas Brusque; 7 August 1976 (age 50) Pau, France
- Height: 1.89 m (6 ft 2 in)
- Weight: 84 kg (13 st 3 lb)

Rugby union career
- Position: Full-back
Senior career
Years	Team	Apps	(Points)
1996–2001	Pau	27	(87)
2001–2010	Biarritz	226	(232)
International career
Years	Team	Apps	(Points)
1997–2006	France	26	(38)

Nicolas Brusque (born 7 August 1976) is a French former rugby union footballer. He has played for the French national team, including being a part of their 2003 Rugby World Cup squad. He usually played at fullback.

He made his international debut for France in a match against Romania in Lourdes in 1997. France won the match 39 points to 3. After playing in the 2002 Six Nations Championship he was then included in France's squad for the 2003 Rugby World Cup. He scored a try in the 51-9 pool win against Scotland.
