= Imanol Harinordoquy =

France international rugby union player

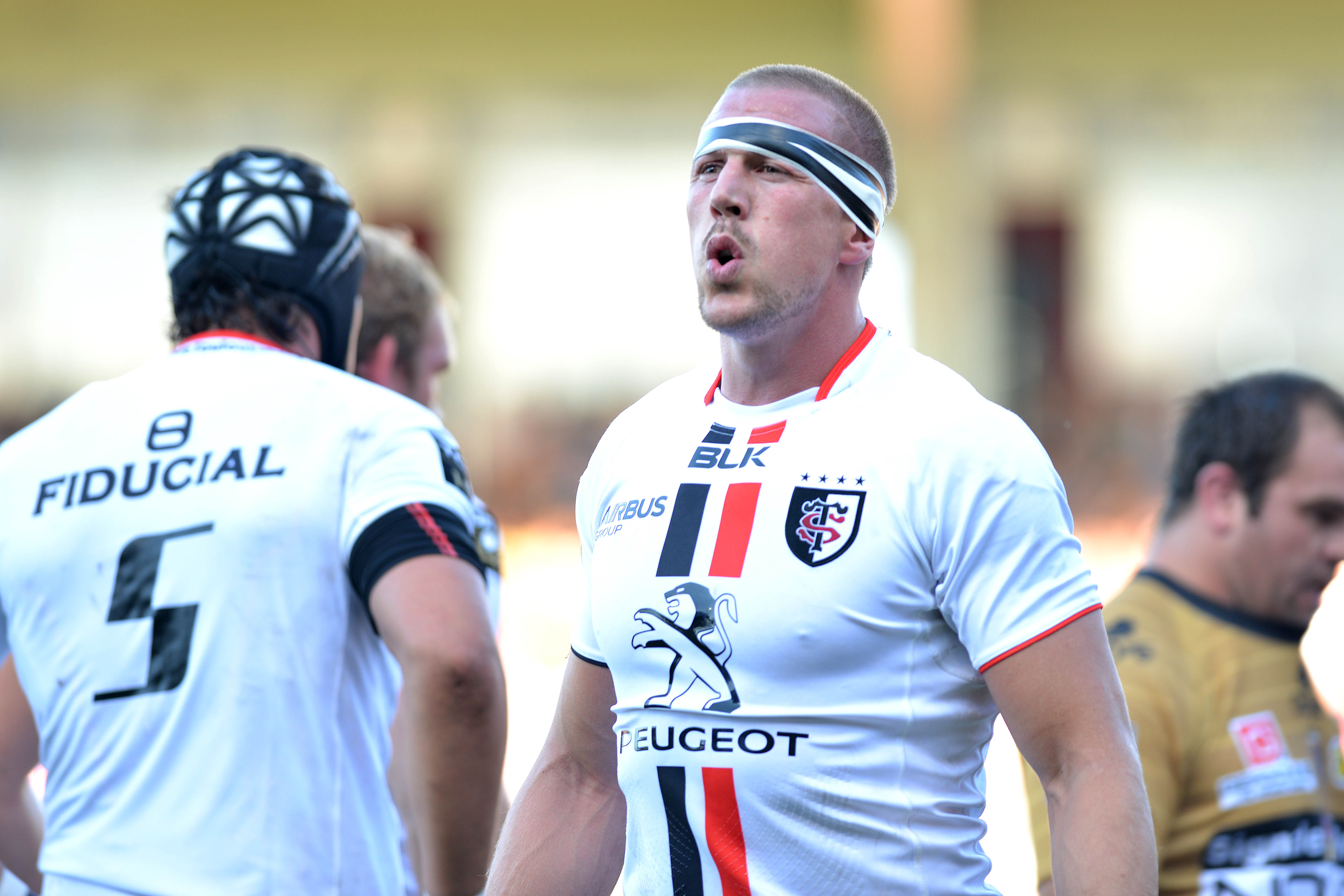
- Born: Imanol Harinordoquy; 20 February 1980 (age 46) Bayonne, France
- Height: 1.93 m (6 ft 4 in)
- Weight: 105 kg (16 st 7 lb; 231 lb)

Rugby union career
- Position: Number 8
Amateur team(s)
Years	Team	Apps	(Points)
1995-1999	Nafarroa		
Senior career
Years	Team	Apps	(Points)
1999–2004	Pau	47	(25)
2004–2014	Biarritz	212	(123)
2014–2016	Toulouse	48	(10)
- Correct as of 10 July 2016
International career
Years	Team	Apps	(Points)
2002–2012	France	82	(65)
- Correct as of 14 November 2014

Imanol Harinordoquy (Note: French pronunciation: [i.ma.nɔl a.ʁi.nɔʁ.do.ki]; Basque: Imanol Hariñordoki, IPA: [imanol haɾiɲoɾdoki].) (born 20 February 1980) is a French former rugby union player. He typically played as a number 8 for Stade Toulousain at club level in the Top 14 and for France internationally. Before signing with Biarritz ahead of the 2004–05 season, he played club rugby at Pau.

Harinordoquy won two Top 14 titles (2005, 2006), five Six Nations victories (2002, 2004, 2006, 2007 and 2010), which included three Grand Slams (2002, 2004, 2010) and the 2012 Amlin Cup. He has also lost 2 Heineken Cup finals, in 2006 and 2010.

== Early life ==
A Basque-speaking native of Bayonne, Pyrénées-Atlantiques, Harinordoquy grew up in St-Jean-Pied-de-Port (Basque: Donibane Garazi). He grew up playing many sports, among them pelota, swimming, football and judo. Harinordoquy began concentrating on the sport of rugby following a knee injury at the age of 14, which limited his football development. He began his career playing for US Nafarroa and quickly advanced in the sport. While excelling at Nafarroa and later Pau, Harinordoquy represented France at under-19 and under-21 levels. He was also brought up in the family's cattle-trading business; when it came time for him to choose between the business and rugby, he opted for the latter. Harinordoquy did, however, earn a BTS in agricultural management.

== Rugby career ==
Harinordoquy joined Pau in 1999 and was a part of the team that reached the semi-finals in his inaugural season with the club, which resulted in qualification to the European Cup in the next season. After consistently appearing with the team the next two seasons, in 2002, Harinordoquy made his international debut just before his 22nd birthday in the Six Nations match against Wales. He contributed to the team and helped France win the Grand Slam that year. In the 2003 Rugby World Cup, Harinordoquy was again in form, grounding tries in wins over Ireland, Scotland and Fiji. Harinordoquy was a fixture in the French side subsequently, helping France to a second Six Nations Grand Slam in 2004. He was joint top try scorer with four in the 2004 edition of the Six Nations competition.

Harinordoquy entered the 2005 Six Nations with 30 caps for France. However, he missed the competition's first fixture against Scotland due to a separated shoulder suffered in his last game for Biarritz before the competition. Harinordoquy, subsequently, had difficulty regaining his form immediately after the injury; he was dropped from the squad by the end of the 2005 tournament. He returned to the team ahead of the 2007 Rugby World Cup and quickly cemented his place within the team. Harinordoquy started in France's opening match against Argentina.

At the end of 2010, Harinordoquy made the short-list for IRB Player of the Year and was the only player from the Northern Hemisphere to do so. He ultimately lost out on the award to All Blacks captain Richie McCaw.

Harinordoquy was a member of the French team that finished as the runner-up to hosts New Zealand in the 2011 Rugby World Cup final.

After Biarritz finished bottom in the 2013/2014 season and was subsequently relegated, Harinordoquy decided to move on to Stade Toulousain for the 2014/2015 Top 14 season. He finished his career at the end of the 2015/16 season.
