= Olivier Azam =

France international rugby union player (born 1974)

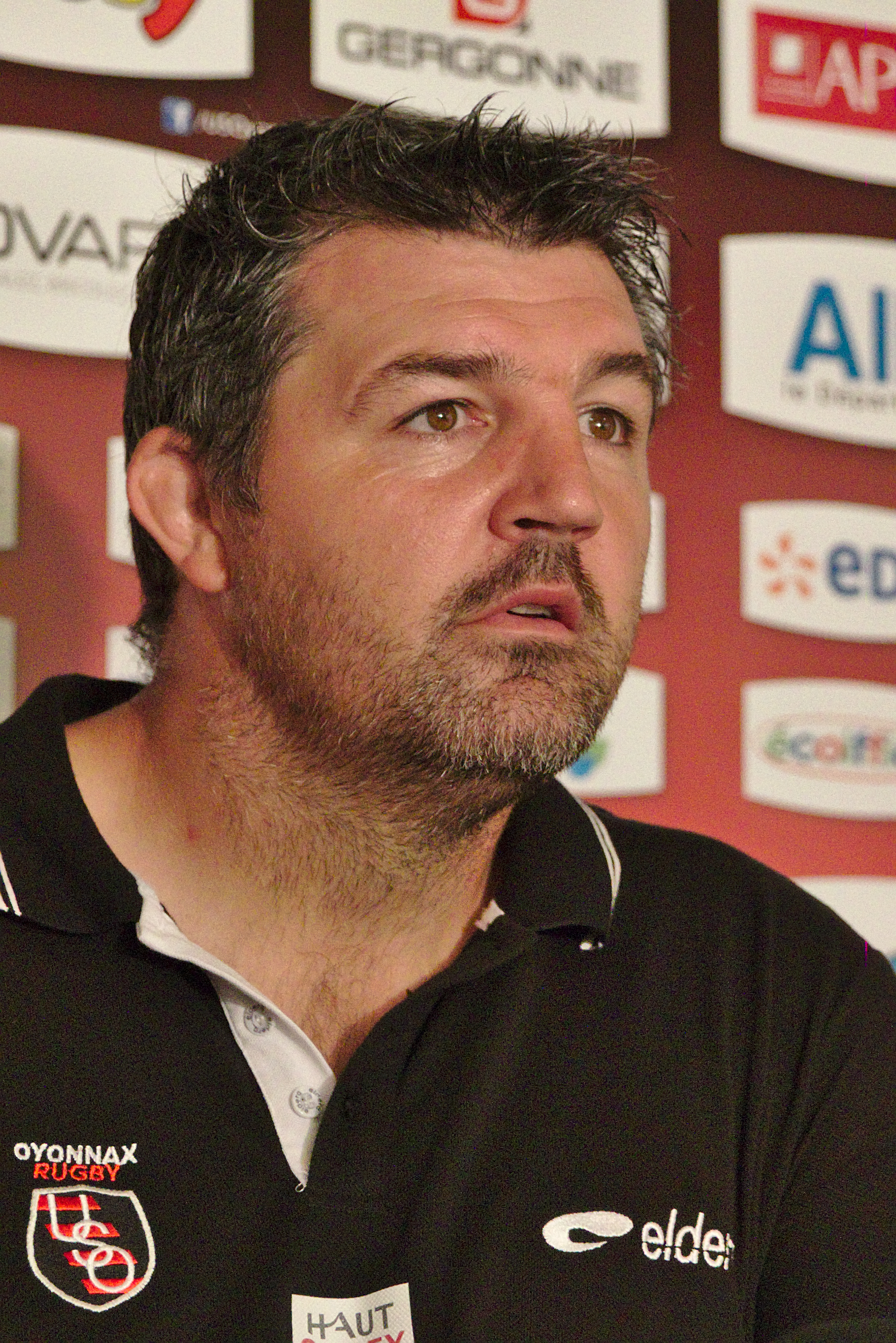
- Born: Olivier Azam; 21 October 1974 (age 52) Tarbes, France
- Height: 6.1 ft (1.9 m)
- Weight: 18 st 12 lb (120 kg)

Rugby union career
- Position: Hooker
- Current team: Montpellier Hérault Rugby
Senior career
Years	Team	Apps	(Points)
2000–2003	Gloucester Rugby	83	(55)
2003–2004	Clermont Auvergne	11	(10)
2004–2011	Gloucester Rugby	110	(70)
International career
Years	Team	Apps	(Points)
1995–2002	France	10	(0)
Coaching career
- Years: Team
- 2011–2013: Toulon (Forwards coach)
- 2013–2015: Lyon (Forwards coach)
- 2015–2015: Oyonnax (Director of Sport)
- 2024-: Portugal (Forwards Coach)
- Correct as of 12 July 2025

Olivier Azam (born 21 October 1974 in Tarbes) is a retired French rugby union footballer. A hooker who could also cover prop, Azam spent most of his professional playing career in the English Premiership at Gloucester Rugby. Azam also had 10 caps for France.

Azam made his Gloucester debut in August 2000 against Saracens. During his first spell at Gloucester he started in the 2002 Zurich Championship Final (the year before winning the play-offs constituted winning the English title) in which Gloucester defeated Bristol Rugby, as well as the 2003 Powergen Cup Final in which Gloucester defeated Northampton Saints. Azam returned to Gloucester Rugby in the summer of 2004 after one year with French outfit Montferrand. He notched over 140 appearances for the West Country club.

Renowned for his aggressive, hard hitting mentality, Azam had to compete with Wallaby international Jeremy Paul and England international Andy Titterrell for the No. 2 shirt upon his return.

Azam was named the player of the season by Gloucester fans for the 2008/09 season.

On 19 May 2011 Gloucester Rugby announced that Azam was leaving Gloucester. Shortly afterward, he chose to return to France to replace Aubin Hueber as forwards coach at Toulon. He left Toulon in 2013 to become the new forwards coach for French side Lyon, replacing Tom Smith.

On 15 December 2014, it was announced Azam would become the Director of Sport for Oyonnax from a three-year contract.

Outside of sport, he runs a successful restaurant in Cheltenham called Armagnac.
