= Federico Pucciariello =

Argentine rugby union player

- Born: 24 June 1975 (age 51)
- Height: 5 ft 9 in (1.75 m)
- Weight: 241 lb (109 kg; 17 st 3 lb)

Rugby union career
- Position: Prop
Senior career
Years	Team	Apps	(Points)
- Gloucester Rugby
–	Bourgoin-Jallieu		
–	Munster		
International career
Years	Team	Apps	(Points)
1999-2002	Italy	8	(5)

Federico Pucciariello (born 24 June 1975 in Rosario, Argentina) is a former Italian Argentine rugby union footballer. He played at both tighthead and loosehead prop, and played for Munster Rugby up to the end of the 2008–09 season. He previously played for Gloucester Rugby and CS Bourgoin-Jallieu in the Heineken Cup.

Born in Rosario, Pucciariello declared for Italy and won 8 caps for the Azzurri. He played one match at the 1999 Rugby World Cup finals. He later admitted he regretted representing a country other than that he was born in. He also said his most difficult match was that when he lined out against the country of his birth.

Pucciariello, or Freddy as he was affectionately known in Munster, was a crowd favourite in Thomond Park and Musgrave Park. He started in the Heineken Cup semi final against Leinster Rugby, and came on as a replacement for Marcus Horan in the Final triumph over Biarritz Olympique in 2006. After that he lost his place on the Munster bench for Heineken Cup games to Irish international Tony Buckley, but still lined up in the Celtic League. Pucciariello retired at the end of the 2008–09 season and returned to his native Argentina. He played his last game for Munster on 15 May 2009 in 36-10 Celtic League win over the Ospreys at Thomond Park where the team also received the trophy as 2008–09 Celtic League winners. He won 85 caps for Munster and scored 7 tries.
