= Damien Traille =

French rugby union player (born 1979)

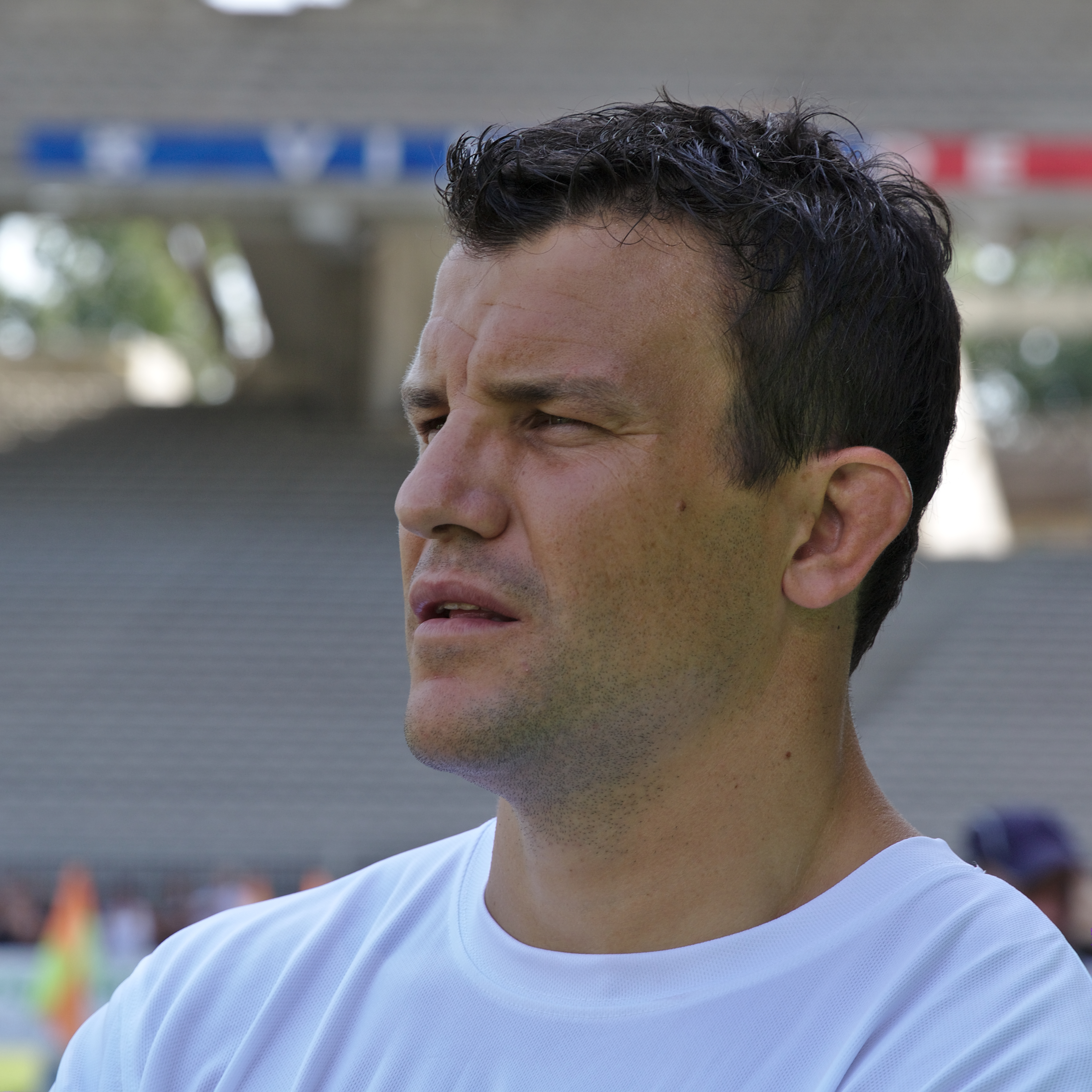
- Born: Damien Traille; 12 June 1979 (age 47) Pau, France
- Height: 1.93 m (6 ft 4 in)
- Weight: 105 kg (16 st 7 lb)

Rugby union career
- Position(s): Centre, Full-back, Fly-half
Senior career
Years	Team	Apps	(Points)
2000–2004	Pau	101	(91)
2004–2014	Biarritz	229	(306)
2014–2016	Pau	33	(29)
International career
Years	Team	Apps	(Points)
2001–2011	France	85	(128)

Damien Traille (born 12 June 1979) is a former French rugby union player. He usually played as a centre, full-back and fly-half.

He has played for France, including at the 2003 Rugby World Cup and the 2011 Rugby World Cup as well as France's Six Nations victories in 2002, 2004, 2006 and 2007.

== Career ==
He played for Pau from the late 1990s through to 2004, when he moved to his current club, Biarritz. Traille made his debut for France in 2001 in a match against the Springboks in Paris. France won the match 20 points to 10. He subsequently made a further two appearances for the national side that year, playing in a test against Australia in Marseille which was won by one point, with the final score 14 to 13 to France, as well as a test against Fiji in St Etienne, which France won by over 60 points.

Traille played in all of France's matches during the 2002 Six Nations Championship. France won all of their five games, which saw them complete a grandslam and win the tournament. He received another six caps for France later that year, playing in tests against Argentina, Australia, South Africa, the All Blacks and Canada.

In 2003 Traille played in all of France's matches during the 2003 Six Nations Championship, with France winning three of their five games. He played five more times for France prior to the World Cup that year; in the two losses to Argentina and the loss to the All Blacks as well as the win over Romania and a 17 to 16 win over England.

Traille was included in France's 2003 Rugby World Cup squad in Australia and played in all of France's five pool matches. France won all their pool games against Fiji, Scotland, Japan and the United States, which saw France finish at the top of their pool. France lost to the All Blacks in the third/fourth place play-off.

The following year, Traille was a part of France's grandslam victory at the 2004 Six Nations Championship, playing in all of their five victories. He was a part of the 2005 Six Nations Championship as well, playing in all the matches, with France only losing the one game to Wales. He played tests against Australia and South Africa later in the year as well.

Traille played in three of France's matches as the 2006 Six Nations Championship, in the wins over Italy, England and Wales. Biarritz made it to the final of the 2005-06 Heineken Cup, but lost to Munster. Biarritz then won the 2005-06 Top 14, defeating Stade Toulousain in the final.

== Honours ==
=== Pau ===
- European Challenge Cup: 1999–2000
- Pro D2: 2014-15

=== Biarritz ===
- European Challenge Cup: 2011–2012
- Top 16/Top 14: 2004-05, 2005-06

=== France ===
- Six Nations Championship: 2002, 2004, 2006, 2007
