= Serge Betsen =

France international rugby union player (born 1974)

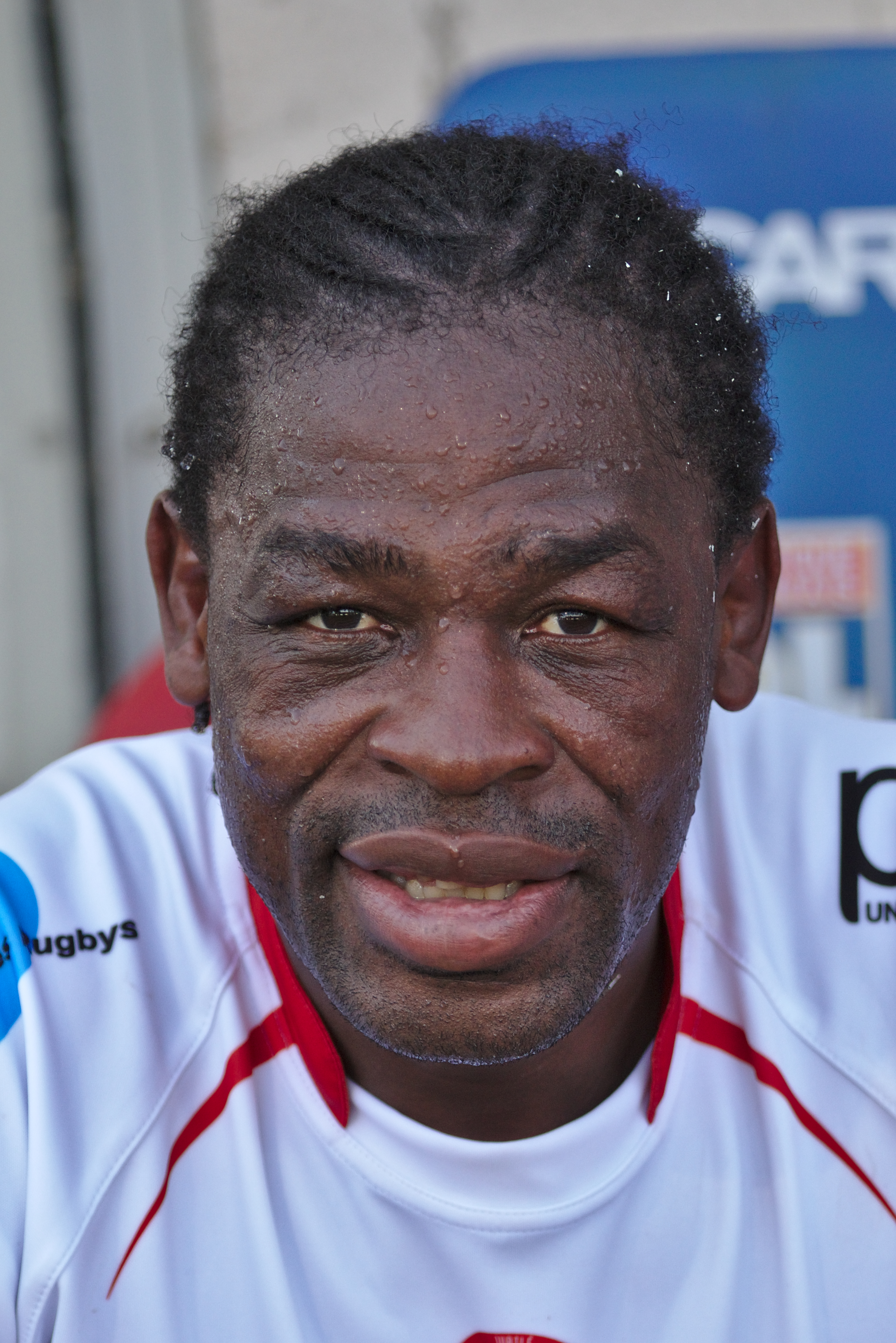
- Betsen in 2015
- Born: Serge Betsen-Tchoua; 25 March 1974 (age 52) Kumba, Cameroon
- Height: 1.83 m (6 ft 0 in)
- Weight: 98 kg (15 st 6)

Rugby union career
- Position: Flanker
- Current team: Biarritz Olympique
Amateur team(s)
Years	Team	Apps	(Points)
1985–1996	Club Sportif de Clichy		
Senior career
Years	Team	Apps	(Points)
1996–2008	Biarritz	172	(65)
2008–2012	London Wasps	79	(35)
International career
Years	Team	Apps	(Points)
1997–2007	France	63	(45)

Official website
- http://www.sergebetsen.net

Serge Betsen Tchoua (born 25 March 1974) is a former French rugby union player who played as a flanker for London Wasps and Biarritz at club level and for France internationally.

He is generally considered to be one of the top flankers of the professional era (post-1995) of rugby union.

== Career ==
Born in Kumba, Cameroon, of partial Bamileke heritage, Betsen moved to France with his mother and six siblings when he was nine, settling in the Clichy suburb of Paris. He played his first competitive rugby for the local Clichy based Club Sportif before joining the southern giants Biarritz when he was just 17.

Betsen made his first appearance for France aged 23 in 1997, as a replacement against Italy, but did not receive his second call-up until the 2000 Six Nations Championship. Thereafter he became a regular starter in the national team.

Nicknamed la Faucheuse (the Grim Reaper), Betsen was regarded as one of the fiercest tacklers in the game, and was also renowned for his high work-rate on the field.

Betsen's finest moment came during the 2002 Six Nations Championship, in the match against England, when his relentless man-marking of Jonny Wilkinson eventually resulted in the fly-half's replacement and paved the way for a 20–15 victory. Later, England's coach, Clive Woodward, said of Betsen: ""He is the only player that I can say was the single-handed reason we lost a match." France went on to win the Grand Slam and Betsen was named France's International Player of the Year. He was an automatic selection for the 2003 Rugby World Cup and scored France's only try in the semi-final loss to England.

In 2005 he was cited following an incident during Biarritz's Heineken Cup match against London Wasps in which Wasps centre Stuart Abbott suffered a broken leg; the complaint was dismissed after a disciplinary hearing found that "the trip, while intentional, was not premeditated" and had happened "in the heat of the moment".

Betsen was renowned as a fearless tackler, but with increasing age he started to pick up more frequent injuries and he missed the 2005 Autumn internationals after fracturing his cheekbone in a match against Toulouse. Despite this, he continued to be a formidable tackler: in the 2007 Six Nations Championship, which France won, he completed 56 tackles, 12 more than any other player in the tournament.

Toward the end of the 2005 season, Betsen held talks with English club Leicester Tigers about a possible move from France, but in the end he decided to stay at Biarritz and signed a new three-year contract.

On 16 January 2008 Betsen announced that he was retiring from international rugby with immediate effect.

On 11 May 2008, it was revealed he was signing for London Wasps.

Betsen made a good start with Wasps performing well and earning respect from the Wasps supporters, for the A side whilst recovering from injury, before moving into the first XV. During the 2009 6 Nations championship he was made Wasps captain in the absence of the senior England players and friend Rafa Ibanez (though retirement caused by injury). The club announced that he would share the captaincy for the remainder of the 2008/09 season with Phil Vickery, and he put in excellent performances as captain, being awarded two man of the match awards in quick succession.

Betsen left London Wasps in June 2011 and announced his retirement from rugby at his "Jubilee" game in Biarritz on 6 June 2012.

Betsen signed with London Scottish as defence coach for the 2012–2013 season.

Betsen is a member of the 'Champions for Peace' club, a group of more than 90 famous created by Peace and Sport, a Monaco-based international organization placed under the High Patronage of H.S.H Prince Albert II. This group of champions, wish to make sport a tool for dialogue and social cohesion.

He also created the Serge Betsen Academy in 2004. This charity aims to help underprivileged children in Cameroon, his native country. On top of introducing the children to Rugby, the charity supports the children's education and access to basic healthcare.

In 2013, he created another charity, the French Legends, which reunites former rugby internationals and professionals in order to participate in charity matches and events to support other charities.

In 2008, he started Serge Betsen Consulting and in 2015, he created Serge Betsen Rugby, a multisport coaching programme for the French schools of London.
