= Jean-Baptiste Poux =

French rugby union player (born 1979)

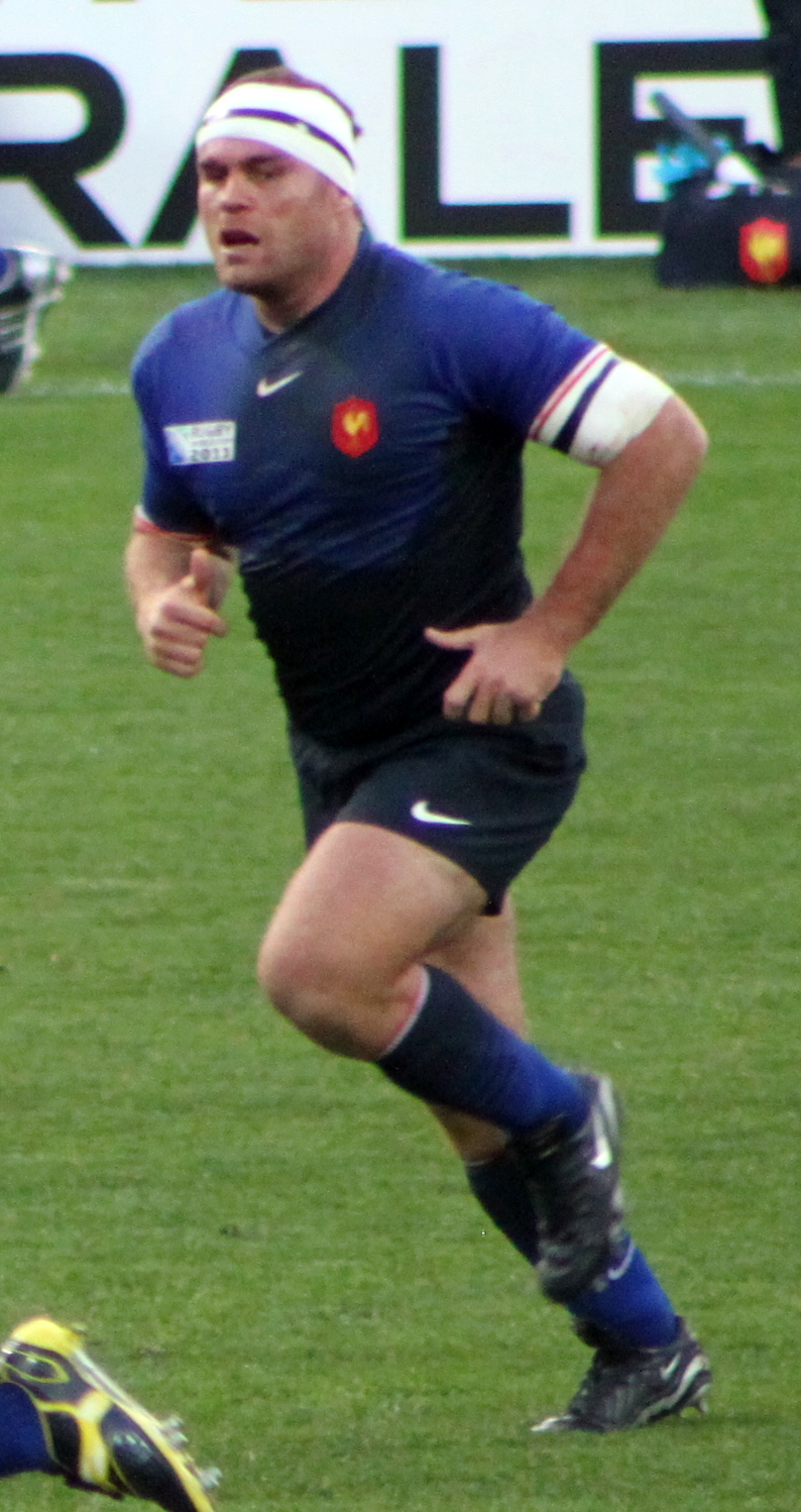
- Born: Jean-Baptiste Poux; 26 September 1979 (age 47) Béziers, France
- Height: 5 ft 11 in (1.80 m)
- Weight: 17 st 0 lb (108 kg)

Rugby union career
- Position: Prop
Senior career
Years	Team	Apps	(Points)
1998–2002	Narbonne	11	(5)
2002–2013	Toulouse	295	(20)
2013–2018	Bordeaux Bègles	83	(0)
International career
Years	Team	Apps	(Points)
2001–2012	France	42	(15)

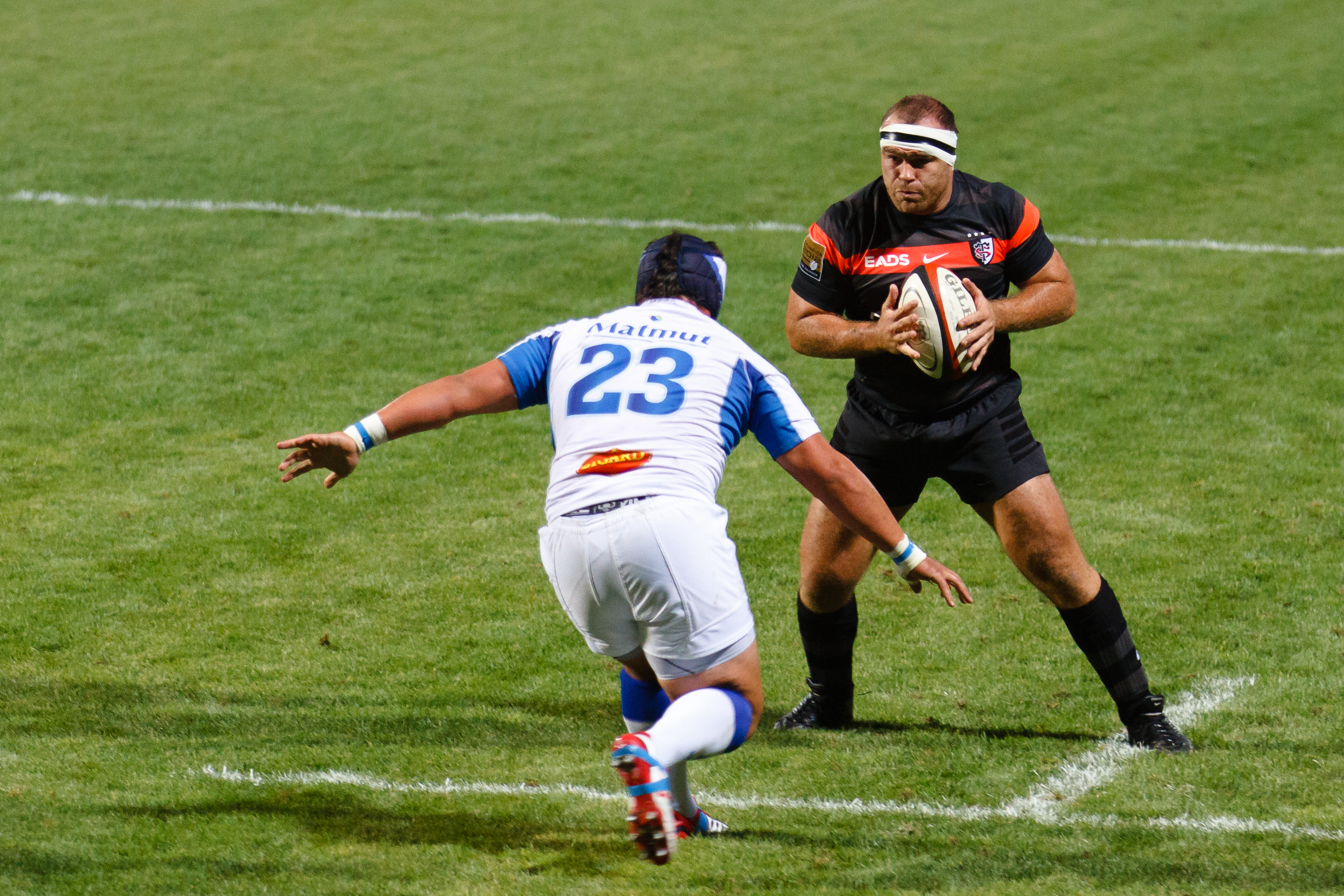
Jean-Baptiste Poux during Stade toulousain vs Castres olympique on 17 August 2012

Jean-Baptiste Poux (French pronunciation: [ʒɑ̃batist puks]; born 26 September 1979) is a former French rugby union footballer who played as a prop, and was capable of playing loosehead and tighthead. Poux began his professional rugby career at RC Narbonne in 1998 before moving to Toulouse, where he was a part of the side that won the 2003, 2005 and 2010 Heineken Cups. In 2013, Poux joined Union Bordeaux Bègles. Poux has also played for the France national team, and was included in their 2003, 2007, and 2011 Rugby World Cup squads.
