= Xavier Garbajosa =

French rugby union player (born 1976)

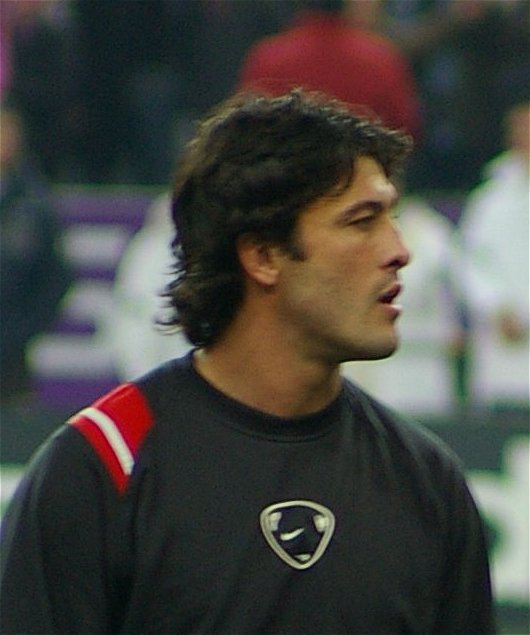
- Born: Xavier Garbajosa; 5 December 1976 (age 49) Toulouse, France
- Height: 1.87 m (6 ft 2 in)

Rugby union career
- Position(s): Fullback, Centre or Wing
Senior career
Years	Team	Apps	(Points)
1994–2007	Toulouse	106	(258)
2007–2008	Bayonne	7	(5)
International career
Years	Team	Apps	(Points)
1998–2003	France	32	(30)
Coaching career
- Years: Team
- 2014–2018: La Rochelle (assistant)
- 2018–2019: La Rochelle
- 2019–2021: Montpellier
- 2022–2023: Lyon

Xavier Garbajosa (born 5 December 1976) is a retired French rugby player who was most recently the manager of Top 14 side Lyon.

Garbajosa was born on 5 December 1976 in Toulouse. He plays in the back-line as a winger, center or full-back. He spent most of his career playing for the Stade Toulousain and moved to the Aviron Bayonnais in the French Top 14 club competition in 2007. With Toulouse, he won the French championship in 1999 and 2001, as well as the European Cup in 2003. Between 2001 and 2003, he was the top-scorer in the French Top 14 for 3 consecutive years.

He was a member of France's squad at the 1999 Rugby World Cup (in which France were the runners-up), and notably participated in the semi-final against New Zealand. He was selected in the French squad for the 2003 Rugby World Cup but had to leave the team before the beginning of the competition due to an injury. He was considered one of the most talented French players of his generation (he was part of the team which won the junior world championship in 1995) but his career was disturbed by recurring knee injuries. He played for the French national team 32 times, making his debut in 1998 in a Test against Ireland, and scored 7 tries (35 points). With the French national team, he won two Grand Slams in 1998 and 2002.
