= Tony Marsh (rugby union) =

France international rugby union player (born 1972)

- Born: Tony Marsh; 12 August 1972 (age 54) Rotorua, New Zealand
- Height: 1.88 m (6 ft 2 in)
- Weight: 97

Rugby union career
- Position: Centre
Senior career
Years	Team	Apps	(Points)
1994–1998	Counties Manukau	57	(100)
1997	Blues	3	(10)
1998	Crusaders	9	(5)
1999–2007	Clermont	95	(117)
- Correct as of 18 June 2018
International career
Years	Team	Apps	(Points)
1998	New Zealand Māori	2	(10)
2001–2004	France	21	(35)
- Correct as of 18 June 2018

Tony Marsh (born 12 August 1972 in Rotorua) is a New Zealand-born former rugby union player who has represented France playing at centre.

At the beginning of the 1990s, he played club rugby in Manurewa and Ardmore before playing National Provincial Championship rugby with Counties.

Marsh joined the Blues Super rugby team in 1996, winning the Super 12 in 97, before switching to the Crusaders with whom he won the title in 1998. He is one of the only players who won back-to-back Super Rugby titles with different teams.

Later that year he left New Zealand for France and signed for Top 12 club Montferrand, now known as Clermont, with whom he reached the final of the league on three occasions, in 1999, 2001 and 2007, won the European Challenge Cup twice in 1999 and in 2007, as well as the now-defunct French national cup in 2001.

After three years in France he became eligible to play for les Bleus and Bernard Laporte named him in the French squad in 2001. He went on to win 21 French caps between 2001 and 2004, scoring 7 tries and helping France win the Grand Slam in 2002.

Early in 2003 he was diagnosed with testicular cancer but overcame the disease after grueling months of chemotherapy sessions and rejoined the French team, reaching the semi-final stage of the 2003 Rugby World Cup.

Marsh played his last game for France in 2004 and his last game for Clermont came in the 2007 French Championship match against Stade Francais, Clermont lost the game narrowly, but they did end the season as European Challenge Cup winners.
