= Chris White (rugby union) =

English rugby union referee

Chris White (born 16 July 1963) is a retired English international rugby referee. He was one of England's top rugby referees and has refereed at three Rugby World Cups.

He started refereeing at 17 years of age and joined the Gloucester Referees Society in 1990.

White was one of 16 referees appointed to the 1999 Rugby World Cup in Wales. He was also again selected as a referee at the 2003 Rugby World Cup in Australia. He refereed the semi-final of this competition between New Zealand and Australia. He was subsequently in charge of the 2005 Grand Slam decider between Wales and Ireland. During a 2007 Six Nations match between Italy and Wales, White ended the game after Wales, after checking with White and believing they had time to score a match winning try, kicked for touch from a penalty. White, at the time, blamed the TMO but later apologised for the misunderstanding. White was selected for the 2007 Rugby World Cup in France, his third World Cup. White retired from test match rugby in 2010, refereeing 50 test matches in total.

He has also taken charge of three Heineken Cup Finals, refereeing the 2002/03, 2004/05 and 2005/06 finals. In total, White refereed 53 Heineken Cup matches, as well as 9 in the Amlin Challenge Cup.

White took on the role of RFU National Referee Academy manager in September 2010, performing this role whilst continuing to referee in the Aviva Premiership. White's 190th and final Aviva Premiership game was on 24 September between Worcester and Harlequins. His final match before retirement took place on 3 December 2011, when he refereed the Help4Heroes Rugby Challenge between the Northern and Southern Hemispheres. White retired after this game to take up his role as National Referee Academy manager on a full-time basis.
