= Gérald Merceron =

French rugby union player

- Born: Gérald Merceron; 25 February 1973 (age 53) Cognac, France
- Height: 1.72 m (5 ft 7 1/2 in)

Rugby union career
- Position: Fly-half
Senior career
Years	Team	Apps	(Points)
1990–1993	Cognac		
1993–1995	Toulon		
1995–2005	Clermont	273	(2704)
2005–2008	La Rochelle	84	(309)
International career
Years	Team	Apps	(Points)
1999–2003	France	32	(267)

Gérald Merceron (born 25 February 1973) is a French former rugby union player He played at fly-half. Unusually he favoured a cone when kicking at goal; the only other player in the modern game to do the same is Chris Ellis.

He played for RC Toulon, ASM Clermont Auvergne and La Rochelle, where he retired at the end of the 2007/08 season.

He had 32 caps for France, from 1999 to 2003. He made his test debut on 3 June 1999 as a replacement against Romania, in a game won by 65–8, aged 26 years old. Merceron amassed an impressive 267 test points during his 32 appearances for the French side during 4 years, slotting 57 penalties, 36 conversions and 3 drop goals as well as scoring 3 tries. He was the highest scorer in the French Grand Slam of the 2002 Six Nations Championship with 80 points. His final appearance in a French jersey was in the third/fourth place play-off match against New Zealand during the 2003 Rugby World Cup, in a game lost by 40–13.
