= 2008–09 Top 14 season =

French rugby union season

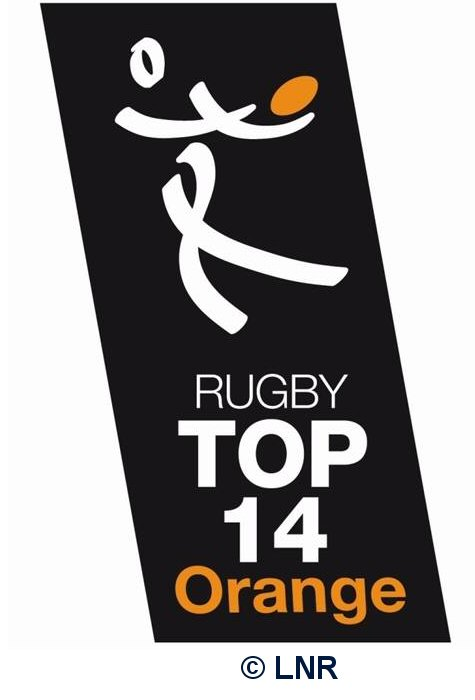
- Countries: France
- Champions: Perpignan (7th title)
- Runners-up: Clermont
- Relegated: Mont-de-Marsan, Dax
- Matches played: 185
- Attendance: 2,362,394 (average 12,770 per match)
- Highest attendance: 79,842; Stade Français v Clermont; 4 April 2009
- Lowest attendance: 4,428; Bourgoin v Mont-de-Marsan; 13 September 2008
- Tries scored: 610 (average 3.3 per match)
- Top point scorer: (Australia) Brock James (324)
- Top try scorer: (Fiji) Napolioni Nalaga (21)

The 2008–09 Top 14 Competition was a French domestic rugby union club competition operated by the Ligue Nationale de Rugby (LNR). It ran from late August 2008 through the final at Stade de France on June 6, 2009, in which Perpignan lifted the Bouclier de Brennus with a 22–13 win over Clermont.

This year's edition of the Top 14 welcomed Toulon, winners of the 2008 title in the second-level Pro D2, and Mont-de-Marsan, victors in the 2008 promotion playoffs between the second- through fifth-place teams in Pro D2. They took the place of Auch and Albi, relegated at the end of the 2007–08 Top 14. Auch, which had been promoted to the Top 14 for 2007–08, finished bottom of the table and went down. The other newly promoted team in 2007–08, Dax, finished second-from-bottom, but were reprieved when French sporting authorities forcibly relegated 12th-place Albi to Pro D2 due to financial issues.

== Teams ==
Club	City (department)	Stadium	Capacity	Previous season
Bayonne	Bayonne (Pyrénées-Atlantiques)	Stade Jean Dauger	16,934 (Note: Although the capacity of Stade Jean Dauger is listed at 16,934, the club achieved an attendance of 18,840 at the ground in their game against Toulouse on 13 May 2009. Whether this attendance was achieved due to a temporary capacity increase is unclear but no sources list Stade Jean Dauger as having a regular capacity of this size.)	9th
Biarritz	Biarritz (Pyrénées-Atlantiques)	Parc des Sports Aguiléra	15,000	6th
Bourgoin	Bourgoin-Jallieu (Isère)	Stade Pierre Rajon	9,441	10th
Brive	Brive-la-Gaillarde (Corrèze)	Stade Amédée-Domenech	15,000	11th
Castres	Castres (Tarn)	Stade Pierre-Fabre	11,500	5th
Clermont	Clermont-Ferrand (Puy-de-Dôme)	Stade Marcel-Michelin	16,574	Runners up (1st in league)
Dax	Dax (Landes)	Stade Maurice Boyau	16,170	13th (not relegated) (Note: Despite finishing 13th Dax were saved from relegation due to 12th placed Albi going down instead due to financial irregularities.)
Mont-de-Marsan	Mont-de-Marsan (Landes)	Stade Guy Boniface	22,000	Promoted from Pro D2 (play-offs)
Montauban	Montauban (Tarn-et-Garonne)	Stade Sapiac	12,600 (Note: Capacity of Stade Sapiac up to 12,600 from 11,500 the previous season.)	7th
Montpellier	Montpellier (Hérault)	Stade Yves-du-Manoir	15,789	8th
Perpignan	Perpignan (Pyrénées-Orientales)	Stade Aimé Giral	16,593	Semi-finals (4th in league)
Stade Français	Paris, 16th arrondissement	Stade Jean-Bouin (Note: Stade Français would also play three home games at the 81,338 capacity Stade de France.)	12,000	Semi-finals (4th in league)
Toulon	Toulon (Var)	Stade Mayol (Note: Toulon would also play one home game at the 67,394 capacity Stade Vélodrome in Marseille.)	13,700	Promoted from Pro D2 (champions)
Toulouse	Toulouse (Haute-Garonne)	Stade Ernest-Wallon (Note: Toulouse would also play three home games at the 35,575 capacity Stadium Municipal.)	19,500	Champions (2nd in league)

Locations of the 2008–09 Top 14 teams

== Competition format ==
Each club plays every other club twice. The second half of the season is conducted in the same order as the first, with the club at home in the first half of the season away in the second. As in previous seasons, the top four clubs at the end of the home-and-away season advanced to a single-elimination playoff. The semifinals were held at neutral sites on May 29 and 30, with the final at Stade de France on June 6.

Going into the season, the top six clubs were guaranteed of berths in the 2009–10 Heineken Cup, with the possibility of a seventh if a French club had advanced further in the 2008–09 Heineken Cup than any team from England or Italy. However, the seventh French berth did not materialize this season, as the only Top 14 club to make the knockout stage, Toulouse, were eliminated in the quarterfinals, while England's Leicester Tigers reached the final (where they lost to Irish side Leinster). The sixth-place team would have been relegated to the 2009–10 European Challenge Cup if 11th-place Bourgoin had won the 2008–09 Challenge Cup final on 22 May; however, Bourgoin were defeated by English side Northampton Saints.

The bottom two teams are provisionally relegated to Pro D2, with the possibility of one or both of the bottom teams to be reprieved if a team above them fails a postseason financial audit (mandatory for all clubs in the league).

The LNR uses a slightly different bonus points system from that used in most other rugby competitions. It trialled a new system in 2007-08 explicitly designed to prevent a losing team from earning more than one bonus point in a match, a system that also makes it impossible for either team to earn a bonus point in a drawn match. LNR chose to continue with this system for 2008-09.

France's bonus point system operates as follows:

- 4 points for a win.
- 2 points for a draw.
- 1 "bonus" point for winning while scoring at least 3 more tries than the opponent. This replaces the standard bonus point for scoring 4 tries regardless of the match result.
- 1 "bonus" point for losing by 7 points (or less).

== Season synopsis ==
While the four playoff teams—Perpignan, Toulouse, Clermont, and Stade Français—separated themselves from the pack fairly early in the season, it was Toulouse who were the form team in the first half of the season; they had a Top 14-record streak of 11 wins from Round 5 through Round 15. However, Perpignan surged in the second half of the season, finishing level with Toulouse on the season log; the Catalans claimed the top seed on the first tiebreaker of head-to-head competition points. Biarritz used a late-season surge to claim fifth place, while the final Heineken Cup berth was ultimately decided in the final round, when Brive's draw with Bourgoin combined with Bayonne's win over Stade Français without a bonus point left Brive and Bayonne level on the log; Brive won on the second tiebreaker of head-to-head scoring.

At the other end of the ladder, Mont-de-Marsan were rarely competitive and finished bottom. The second relegation place finally fell on Dax, after Bourgoin, Castres, and the highly ambitious Toulon spent time in relegation trouble.

For much of the season, Bourgoin faced another type of relegation trouble—financial. At the end of each season, all teams in both divisions of LNR must pass a financial audit conducted by DNACG (Direction nationale d'aide et de contrôle de gestion), LNR's financial arm, to be able to keep their professional licenses. The club were able to satisfy DNACG that they had sufficient financial guarantees to participate in Top 14 and were thus allowed to stay in the top flight.

- Second division: 2008–09 Rugby Pro D2 season

== Table ==
Pos	Team	Pld	W	D	L	PF	PA	PD	B	Pts	Qualification or relegation
1	Perpignan (C)	26	20	1	5	615	374	+241	10	92 (Note: Perpignan finished first on the ladder, ahead of Toulouse, based on a 5–4 edge in head-to-head competition points; Toulouse scored a regular win against Perpignan in Round 6, while Perpignan picked up a bonus-point win in the return match in Round 19.)	Advance to playoffs Qualified for the 2009–10 Heineken Cup
2	Toulouse (SF)	26	21	0	5	594	324	+270	8	92	Advance to playoffs Qualified for the 2009–10 Heineken Cup
3	Clermont (F)	26	16	1	9	754	367	+387	17	83	Advance to playoffs Qualified for the 2009–10 Heineken Cup
4	Stade Français (SF)	26	16	1	9	622	430	+192	12	78	Advance to playoffs Qualified for the 2009–10 Heineken Cup
5	Biarritz	26	15	0	11	516	398	+118	11	71	Qualified for the 2009–10 Heineken Cup
6	Brive	26	13	4	9	481	481	0	6	66 (Note: Brive edged out Bayonne for sixth place, and ultimately the final Heineken Cup berth. In Round 8, Bayonne defeated Brive 14–9 at home. In the return match in Round 21, Brive won 13–6 at home. Since both losing teams picked up bonus points, the tiebreaker went to head-to-head point differential, in which Brive had a two-point edge.)	Qualified for the 2009–10 Heineken Cup
7	Bayonne	26	14	2	10	475	481	−6	6	66	
8	Montauban	26	10	2	14	485	572	−87	9	53	
9	Toulon	26	9	2	15	409	488	−79	11	51	
10	Montpellier	26	11	0	15	408	568	−160	6	50	
11	Bourgoin	26	8	2	16	451	599	−148	10	46	
12	Castres	26	7	3	16	473	537	−64	10	44	
13	Dax (R)	26	7	1	18	375	634	−259	7	37	Relegated to the 2009–10 Rugby Pro D2
14	Mont-de-Marsan (R)	26	5	1	20	325	730	−405	7	29	Relegated to the 2009–10 Rugby Pro D2

(C) Champion; (R) Relegated

== Fixtures & Results ==
=== Round 1 ===
26 August 2008
19:00

Biarritz	29 - 22	Bourgoin (1 BP)

Parc des Sports Aguiléra
Attendance: 10,133

26 August 2008
19:00

(1 BP) Castres	26 - 27	Bayonne

Stade Pierre-Fabre
Attendance: 7,717

26 August 2008
19:00

Dax	9 - 31	Stade Français (1 BP)

Stade Maurice Boyau
Attendance: 9,110

26 August 2008
19:00

(1 BP) Montauban	37 - 19	Mont-de-Marsan

Stade Sapiac
Attendance: 6,844

26 August 2008
19:00

Montpellier	16 - 11	Toulouse (1 BP)

Stade Yves-du-Manoir
Attendance: 14,248

26 August 2008
19:00

Perpignan	34 - 18	Brive

Stade Aimé Giral
Attendance: 12,890

26 August 2008
21:00

Toulon	22 - 16	Clermont (1 BP)

Stade Mayol
Attendance: 12,835

=== Round 2 ===
30 August 2008
14:30

Bayonne	22 - 20	Montauban (1 BP)

Stade Jean Dauger
Attendance: 11,412

30 August 2008
14:30

(1 BP) Clermont	43 - 20	Montpellier

Stade Marcel-Michelin
Attendance: 12,207

30 August 2008
14:30

Stade Français	27 - 22	Mont-de-Marsan

Stade Jean-Bouin
Attendance: 8,777

30 August 2008
14:30

Toulon	3 - 3	Brive

Stade Mayol
Attendance: 12,351

30 August 2008
14:30

Toulouse	25 - 20	Dax (1 BP)

Stade Ernest-Wallon
Attendance: 15,665

30 August 2008
16:45

Biarritz	32 - 17	Castres

Parc des Sports Aguiléra
Attendance: 7,667

30 August 2008
20:30

(1 BP) Bourgoin	16 - 22	Perpignan

Stade Pierre Rajon
Attendance: 5,283

=== Round 3 ===
5 September 2008
20:30

Bayonne	17 - 6	Clermont

Stade Jean Dauger
Attendance: 11,841

6 September 2008
14:30

Brive	16 - 16	Castres

Stade Amédée-Domenech
Attendance: 7,893

6 September 2008
14:30

(1 BP) Dax	6 - 9	Montpellier

Stade Maurice Boyau
Attendance: 5,057

6 September 2008
14:30

Montauban	18 - 14	Bourgoin (1 BP)

Stade Sapiac
Attendance: 5,068

6 September 2008
16:30

Perpignan	11 - 26	Stade Français

Stade Aimé Giral
Attendance: 11,671

6 September 2008
20:30

Mont-de-Marsan	25 - 18	Toulon (1 BP)

Stade Guy Boniface
Attendance: 6,851

7 September 2008
20:00

(1 BP) Toulouse	20 - 6	Biarritz

Stadium Municipal
Attendance: 24,722

=== Round 4 ===
12 September 2008
20:30

(1 BP) Toulon	13 - 19	Stade Français

Stade Mayol
Attendance: 12,916

13 September 2008
14:30

Bourgoin	18 - 6	Mont-de-Marsan

Stade Pierre Rajon
Attendance: 4,428

13 September 2008
14:30

Castres	11 - 19	Dax

Stade Pierre-Fabre
Attendance: 6,907

13 September 2008
14:30

(1 BP) Montpellier	32 - 10	Montauban

Stade Yves-du-Manoir
Attendance: 10,263

13 September 2008
14:30

(1 BP) Perpignan	38 - 10	Bayonne

Stade Aimé Giral
Attendance: 11,671

13 September 2008
16:30

Clermont	16 - 6	Toulouse

Stade Marcel-Michelin
Attendance: 14,701

13 September 2008
20:30

Biarritz	24 - 5	Brive

Parc des Sports Aguiléra
Attendance: 8,101

=== Round 5 ===
19 September 2008
20:30

Dax	30 - 18	Biarritz

Stade Maurice Boyau
Attendance: 8,004

20 September 2008
14:30

Bayonne	19 - 15	Mont-de-Marsan (1 BP)

Stade Jean Dauger
Attendance: 12,827

20 September 2008
14:30

Castres	12 - 6	Clermont (1 BP)

Stade Pierre-Fabre
Attendance: 7,103

20 September 2008
14:30

(1 BP) Stade Français	37 - 16	Brive

Stade Jean-Bouin
Attendance: 9,250

20 September 2008
14:30

Toulon	15 - 9	Bourgoin (1 BP)

Stade Mayol
Attendance: 12,557

20 September 2008
16:30

Montauban	10 - 41	Toulouse (1 BP)

Stade Sapiac
Attendance: 9,049

20 September 2008
20:30

(1 BP) Montpellier	3 - 5	Perpignan

Stade Yves-du-Manoir
Attendance: 14,182

=== Round 6 ===
26 September 2008
20:30

(1 BP) Bourgoin	25 - 32	Stade Français

Stade des Alpes, Grenoble
Attendance: 18,014

27 September 2008
14:30

(1 BP) Brive	41 - 9	Dax

Stade Amédée-Domenech
Attendance: 7,893

27 September 2008
14:30

(1 BP) Clermont	32 - 6	Biarritz

Stade Marcel-Michelin
Attendance: 14,498

27 September 2008
14:30

(1 BP) Mont-de-Marsan	16 - 22	Montpellier

Stade Guy Boniface
Attendance: 6,237

27 September 2008
14:30

Montauban	24 - 23	Castres (1 BP)

Stade Sapiac
Attendance: 5,844

27 September 2008
16:30

Toulouse	30 - 20	Perpignan

Stade Ernest-Wallon
Attendance: 18,739

27 September 2008
20:30

Bayonne	19 - 15	Toulon (1 BP)

Stade Jean Dauger
Attendance: 13,902

=== Round 7 ===
3 October 2008
20:30

Castres	10 - 28	Toulouse

Stade Pierre-Fabre
Attendance: 9,451

4 October 2008
14:30

(1 BP) Biarritz	46 - 3	Montpellier

Parc des Sports Aguiléra
Attendance: 7,000

4 October 2008
14:30

(1 BP) Brive	53 - 11	Mont-de-Marsan

Stade Amédée-Domenech
Attendance: 8,208

4 October 2008
14:30

Perpignan	37 - 12	Toulon

Stade Aimé Giral
Attendance: 13,061

4 October 2008
14:30

(1 BP) Stade Français	34 - 16	Montauban

Stade Jean-Bouin
Attendance: 8,357

4 October 2008
16:30

(1 BP) Bourgoin	23 - 30	Clermont

Stade Pierre Rajon
Attendance: 6,872

4 October 2008
20:30

Dax	27 - 17	Bayonne

Stade Maurice Boyau
Attendance: 10,204

=== Round 8 ===
24 October 2008
20:30

Mont-de-Marsan	6 - 33	Biarritz (1 BP)

Stade Guy Boniface
Attendance: 7,064

25 October 2008
14:30

Bayonne	14 - 9 (Note: This was the first Top 14 match to see both teams earn bonus points since LNR adopted its revised bonus points system in the 2007-08 season.)	Brive (1 BP)

Stade Jean Dauger
Attendance: 11,441

25 October 2008
14:30

(1 BP) Clermont	25 - 30	Montauban (1 BP)

Stade Marcel-Michelin
Attendance: 12,940

25 October 2008
14:30

(1 BP) Montpellier	12 - 19	Bourgoin

Stade Yves-du-Manoir
Attendance: 10,007

25 October 2008
14:30

Perpignan	17 - 6	Dax

Stade Aimé Giral
Attendance: 11,705

25 October 2008
16:30

Stade Français	13 - 26	Toulouse

Stade de France
Attendance: 78,782

25 October 2008
20:30

(1 BP) Toulon	17 - 21	Castres

Stade Mayol
Attendance: 12,144

=== Round 9 ===
31 October 2008
18:30

(1 BP) Montauban	42 - 20	Toulon

Stade Sapiac
Attendance: 6,291

1 November 2008
14:30

(1 BP) Castres	28 - 31	Montpellier

Stade Pierre-Fabre
Attendance: 7,279

1 November 2008
14:30

Dax	32 - 10	Bourgoin

Stade Maurice Boyau
Attendance: 6,978

1 November 2008
14:30

Mont-de-Marsan	7 - 31	Perpignan (1 BP)

Stade Guy Boniface
Attendance: 6,140

1 November 2008
14:30

Toulouse	21 - 15	Brive (1 BP)

Stade Ernest-Wallon
Attendance: 18,708

1 November 2008
16:30

Clermont	22 - 6	Stade Français

Stade Marcel-Michelin
Attendance: 15,724

1 November 2008
20:30

(1 BP) Biarritz	12 - 14	Bayonne

Parc des Sports Aguiléra
Attendance: 13,104

=== Round 10 ===
14 November 2008
20:30

Montpellier	26 - 13	Stade Français

Stade Yves-du-Manoir
Attendance: 14,570

15 November 2008
14:30

(1 BP) Bourgoin	9 - 13	Bayonne

Stade Pierre Rajon
Attendance: 5,325

15 November 2008
14:30

Castres	26 - 3	Mont-de-Marsan

Stade Pierre-Fabre
Attendance: 6,615

15 November 2008
14:30

Dax	20 - 20	Montauban

Stade Maurice Boyau
Attendance: 5,703

15 November 2008
14:30

Toulouse	19 - 18	Toulon (1 BP)

Stade Ernest-Wallon
Attendance: 18,701

15 November 2008
16:30

Brive	18 - 16	Clermont (1 BP)

Stade Amédée-Domenech
Attendance: 11,708

15 November 2008
20:45

(1 BP) Perpignan	27 - 12	Biarritz

Stade Aimé Giral
Attendance: 12,942

=== Round 11 ===
21 November 2008
19:00

(1 BP) Bourgoin	12 - 18	Toulouse

Stade Pierre Rajon
Attendance: 7,989

21 November 2008
21:00

Stade Français	19 - 12	Castres (1 BP)

Stade Jean-Bouin
Attendance: 7,443

22 November 2008
14:30

(1 BP) Bayonne	42 - 9	Montpellier

Stade Jean Dauger
Attendance: 10,938

22 November 2008
14:30

Brive	33 - 28	Montauban (1 BP)

Stade Amédée-Domenech
Attendance: 7,892

22 November 2008
14:30

Mont-de-Marsan	12 - 6	Dax (BP)

Stade Guy Boniface
Attendance: 8,832

22 November 2008
14:30

Toulon	10 - 5	Biarritz (1 BP)

Stade Mayol
Attendance: 12,357

22 November 2008
16:30

Clermont	29 - 9	Perpignan

Stade Marcel-Michelin
Attendance: 14,364

=== Round 12 ===
28 November 2008
20:35

Toulouse	32 - 11	Bayonne

Stade Ernest-Wallon
Attendance: 18,701

29 November 2008
14:30

Castres	9 - 23	Bourgoin

Stade Pierre-Fabre
Attendance: 6,851

29 November 2008
14:30

Mont-de-Marsan	12 - 11	Clermont (1 BP)

Stade Guy Boniface
Attendance: 5,507

29 November 2008
14:30

(1 BP) Montauban	6 - 9	Perpignan

Stade Sapiac
Attendance: 6,965

29 November 2008
14:30

(1 BP) Toulon	6 - 13	Dax

Stade Mayol
Attendance: 11,482

29 November 2008
16:30

Biarritz	13 - 32	Stade Français (1 BP)

Parc des Sports Aguiléra
Attendance: 9,923

29 November 2008
20:45

Montpellier	9 - 22	Brive

Stade Yves-du-Manoir
Attendance: 9,517

=== Round 13 ===
19 December 2008
20:35

(1 BP) Dax	16 - 20	Clermont

Stade Maurice Boyau
Attendance: 5,983

20 December 2008
14:30

Brive	20 - 12	Bourgoin

Stade Amédée-Domenech
Attendance: 8,529

20 December 2008
14:30

(1 BP) Montpellier	33 - 8	Toulon

Stade Yves-du-Manoir
Attendance: 11,707

20 December 2008
14:30

Perpignan	16 - 9	Castres (1 BP)

Stade Aimé Giral
Attendance: 13,102

20 December 2008
14:30

(1 BP) Toulouse	27 - 6	Mont-de-Marsan

Stade Ernest-Wallon
Attendance: 18,654

20 December 2008
16:30

(1 BP) Stade Français	35 - 8	Bayonne

Stade Jean-Bouin
Attendance: 9,395

20 December 2008
20:35

Montauban	19 - 12	Biarritz (1 BP)

Stade Sapiac
Attendance: 6,402

=== Round 14 ===
2 January 2009
20:35

Bayonne	13 - 13	Castres

Stade Jean Dauger
Attendance: 12,665

3 January 2009
14:30

Bourgoin	15 - 14	Biarritz (1 BP)

Stade Pierre Rajon
Attendance: 6,430

3 January 2009
14:30

Mont-de-Marsan	16 - 13	Montauban (1 BP)

Stade Guy Boniface
Attendance: 5,771

3 January 2009
14:30

(1 BP) Clermont	32 - 5	Toulon

Stade Marcel-Michelin
Attendance: 15,102

3 January 2009
14:30

(1 BP) Stade Français	56 - 15	Dax

Stade Jean-Bouin
Attendance: 9,248

3 January 2009
16:30

(1 BP) Toulouse	34 - 0	Montpellier

Stade Ernest-Wallon
Attendance: 18,725

3 January 2009
20:45

(1 BP) Brive	15 - 18	Perpignan

Stade Amédée-Domenech
Attendance: 9,613

=== Round 15 ===
9 January 2009
20:35

Dax	9 - 25 (Note: Toulouse win their 11th consecutive Top 14 match, breaking the previous record of 10 set last season by Clermont.)	Toulouse

Stade Maurice Boyau
Attendance: 8,325

10 January 2009
14:30

(1 BP) Castres	9 - 10	Biarritz

Stade Pierre-Fabre
Attendance: 7,753

10 January 2009
14:30

(1 BP) Mont-de-Marsan	6 - 13	Stade Français

Stade Guy Boniface
Attendance: 7,921

10 January 2009
14:30

Montauban	15 - 13	Bayonne (1 BP)

Stade Sapiac
Attendance: 6,288

10 January 2009
14:30

(1 BP) Perpignan	40 - 14	Bourgoin

Stade Aimé Giral
Attendance: 11,811

10 January 2009
16:30

Montpellier	3 - 30	Clermont (1 BP)

Stade Yves-du-Manoir
Attendance: 13,182

10 January 2009
20:35

Brive	19 - 9	Toulon

Stade Amédée-Domenech
Attendance: 8,660

=== Round 16 ===
30 January 2009
20:35

(1 BP) Toulon	38 - 22	Mont-de-Marsan

Stade Mayol
Attendance: 12,316

31 January 2009
14:30

Biarritz	17 - 13 (Note: Toulouse's Top 14-record win streak of 11 ends.)	Toulouse (1 BP)

Parc des Sports Aguiléra
Attendance: 11,018

31 January 2009
14:30

Bourgoin	25 - 15	Montauban

Stade Pierre Rajon
Attendance: 5,441

31 January 2009
14:30

Castres	11 - 11	Brive

Stade Pierre-Fabre
Attendance: 9,304

31 January 2009
14:30

(1 BP) Clermont	44 - 10	Bayonne

Stade Marcel-Michelin
Attendance: 15,806

31 January 2009
14:30

Montpellier	23 - 14	Dax

Stade Yves-du-Manoir
Attendance: 9,552

31 January 2009
16:30

Stade Français	13 - 13	Perpignan

Stade de France
Attendance: 79,122

=== Round 17 ===
20 February 2009
20:35

Stade Français	22 - 12	Toulon

Stade Jean-Bouin
Attendance: 9,167

21 February 2009
14:30

Brive	19 - 15	Biarritz (1 BP)

Stade Amédée-Domenech
Attendance: 10,154

21 February 2009
14:30

Dax	16 - 32	Castres (1 BP)

Stade Maurice Boyau
Attendance: 6,738

21 February 2009
14:30

Mont-de-Marsan	16 - 16	Bourgoin

Stade Guy Boniface
Attendance: 5,734

21 February 2009
14:30

Montauban	27 - 19	Montpellier

Stade Sapiac
Attendance: 5,734

21 February 2009
16:30

Bayonne	19 - 12	Perpignan (1 BP)

Stade Jean Dauger
Attendance: 15,125

22 February 2009
16:30

Toulouse	20 - 13	Clermont (1 BP)

Stadium Municipal
Attendance: 34,932

=== Round 18 ===
27 February 2009
19:00

Bourgoin	12 - 23	Toulon (1 BP)

Stade Pierre Rajon
Attendance: 6,672

28 February 2009
14:15

Brive	26 - 11	Stade Français

Stade Amédée-Domenech
Attendance: 11,106

28 February 2009
14:30

(1 BP) Biarritz	44 - 13	Dax

Parc des Sports Aguiléra
Attendance: 8,031

28 February 2009
14:30

Clermont	43 - 20	Castres

Stade Marcel-Michelin
Attendance: 13,919

28 February 2009
14:30

(1 BP) Mont-de-Marsan	30 - 37	Bayonne

Stade Guy Boniface
Attendance: 7,201

28 February 2009
14:30

(1 BP) Perpignan	50 - 13	Montpellier

Stade Aimé Giral
Attendance: 12,690

28 February 2009
20:35

Toulouse	9 - 6	Montauban (1 BP)

Stade Ernest-Wallon
Attendance: 18,649

=== Round 19 ===
6 March 2009
21:00

(1 BP) Perpignan	32 - 8	Toulouse

Stade Aimé Giral
Attendance: 14,578

7 March 2009
14:30

Castres	31 - 19	Montauban

Stade Pierre-Fabre
Attendance: 7,668

7 March 2009
14:30

(1 BP) Dax	15 - 17	Brive

Stade Maurice Boyau
Attendance: 5,514

7 March 2009
14:30

(1 BP) Montpellier	33 - 6	Mont-de-Marsan

Stade Yves-du-Manoir
Attendance: 9,503

7 March 2009
14:30

(1 BP) Stade Français	53 - 3	Bourgoin

Stade Jean-Bouin
Attendance: 8,401

7 March 2009
16:30

Biarritz	18 - 14	Clermont (1 BP)

Parc des Sports Aguiléra
Attendance: 8,708

7 March 2009
20:35

Toulon	3 - 3	Bayonne

Stade Mayol
Attendance: 12,888

=== Round 20 ===
13 March 2009
20:35

Montauban	22 - 16	Stade Français (1 BP)

Stade Sapiac
Attendance: 12,589

14 March 2009
14:15

Toulouse	26 - 11	Castres

Stade Ernest-Wallon
Attendance: 17,984

14 March 2009
14:30

Bayonne	14 - 9	Dax (1 BP)

Stade Jean Dauger
Attendance: 12,589

14 March 2009
14:30

(1 BP) Clermont	57 - 23	Bourgoin

Stade Marcel-Michelin
Attendance: 13,936

14 March 2009
14:30

(1 BP) Mont-de-Marsan	16 - 18	Brive

Stade Guy Boniface
Attendance: 8,099

14 March 2009
14:30

(1 BP) Toulon	29 - 32	Perpignan

Stade Mayol
Attendance: 12,415

14 March 2009
20:35

Montpellier	12 - 9	Biarritz (1 BP)

Stade Yves-du-Manoir
Attendance: 10,627

=== Round 21 ===
27 March 2009
20:35

Castres	25 - 9	Toulon

Stade Pierre-Fabre
Attendance: 8,497

28 March 2009
14:30

(1 BP) Biarritz	37 - 7	Mont-de-Marsan

Parc des Sports Aguiléra
Attendance: 7,192

28 March 2009
14:30

Bourgoin	22 - 3	Montpellier

Stade Pierre Rajon
Attendance: 5,847

28 March 2009
14:30

(1 BP) Dax	13 - 16	Perpignan

Stade Maurice Boyau
Attendance: 6,333

28 March 2009
14:30

Montauban	19 - 19	Clermont

Stade Sapiac
Attendance: 6,724

28 March 2009
16:30

Brive	13 - 6	Bayonne (1 BP)

Stade Amédée-Domenech
Attendance: 10,762

29 March 2009
20:35

Toulouse	15 - 11	Stade Français (1 BP)

Stadium Municipal
Attendance: 34,993

=== Round 22 ===
3 April 2009
20:35

(1 BP) Bourgoin	43 - 6	Dax

Stade Pierre Rajon
Attendance: 6,418

4 April 2009
14:30

Brive	10 - 42	Toulouse (1 BP)

Stade Amédée-Domenech
Attendance: 14,066

4 April 2009
14:30

(1 BP) Montpellier	21 - 23	Castres

Stade Yves-du-Manoir
Attendance: 10,547

4 April 2009
14:30

(1 BP) Perpignan	44 - 3	Mont-de-Marsan

Stade Aimé Giral
Attendance: 12,211

4 April 2009
14:30

Toulon	33 - 20	Montauban

Stade Mayol
Attendance: 12,491

4 April 2009
16:30

(1 BP) Stade Français	19 - 21	Clermont

Stade de France
Attendance: 79,842

4 April 2009
20:35

(1 BP) Bayonne	15 - 19	Biarritz

Stade Jean Dauger
Attendance: 16,930

=== Round 23 ===
17 April 2009
20:35

Biarritz	12 - 10	Perpignan (1 BP)

Parc des Sports Aguiléra
Attendance: 10,243

18 April 2009
14:30

(1 BP) Bayonne	61 - 10	Bourgoin

Stade Jean Dauger
Attendance: 11,624

18 April 2009
14:30

(1 BP) Clermont	52 - 7	Brive

Stade Marcel-Michelin
Attendance: 15,853

18 April 2009
14:30

Mont-de-Marsan	21 - 15	Castres (1 BP)

Stade Guy Boniface
Attendance: 5,445

18 April 2009
14:30

Stade Français	24 - 15	Montpellier

Stade Jean-Bouin
Attendance: 8,651

18 April 2009
16:30

Toulon	14 - 6	Toulouse

Stade Vélodrome, Marseille
Attendance: 56,953

18 April 2009
20:35

(1 BP) Montauban	15 - 20	Dax

Stade Sapiac
Attendance: 6,614

=== Round 24 ===
24 April 2009
20:35

(1 BP) Castres	16 - 21	Stade Français

Stade Pierre-Fabre
Attendance: 8,891

25 April 2009
14:30

Biarritz	19 - 12	Toulon (1 BP)

Parc des Sports Aguiléra
Attendance: 8,257

25 April 2009
14:30

Montauban	15 - 10	Brive (1 BP)

Stade Sapiac
Attendance: 6,897

25 April 2009
14:30

Montpellier	20 - 11	Bayonne

Stade Yves-du-Manoir
Attendance: 12,497

25 April 2009
14:30

Perpignan	20 - 16	Clermont (1 BP)

Stade Aimé Giral
Attendance: 14,499

25 April 2009
16:30

Toulouse	13 - 6	Bourgoin (1 BP)

Stade Ernest-Wallon
Attendance: 18,666

25 April 2009
20:35

Dax	12 - 8	Mont-de-Marsan (1 BP)

Stade Maurice Boyau
Attendance: 9,725

=== Round 25 ===
8 May 2009
20:35

Dax	12 - 22	Toulon

Stade Maurice Boyau
Attendance: 8,030

9 May 2009
14:30

Bourgoin	31 - 23	Castres

Stade Pierre Rajon
Attendance: 6,402

9 May 2009
14:30

Brive	28 - 18	Montpellier

Stade Amédée-Domenech
Attendance: 9,272

9 May 2009
14:30

(1 BP) Clermont	66 - 3	Mont-de-Marsan

Stade Marcel-Michelin
Attendance: 15,745

9 May 2009
14:30

(1 BP) Perpignan	19 - 9	Montauban

Stade Aimé Giral
Attendance: 13,798

9 May 2009
16:30

(1 BP) Bayonne	9 - 12	Toulouse

Stade Jean Dauger
Attendance: 18,840

10 May 2009
20:45

(1 BP) Stade Français	12 - 16	Biarritz

Stade Jean-Bouin
Attendance: 9,104

=== Round 26 ===
16 May 2009
16:30

Bayonne	31 - 27	Stade Français (1 BP)

Stade Jean Dauger
Attendance: 15,248

16 May 2009
16:30

(1 BP) Biarritz	38 - 10	Montauban

Parc des Sports Aguiléra
Attendance: 8,774

16 May 2009
16:30

Bourgoin	19 - 19	Brive

Stade Pierre Rajon
Attendance: 6,558

16 May 2009
16:30

(1 BP) Castres	26 - 32	Perpignan

Stade Pierre-Fabre
Attendance: 9,039

16 May 2009
16:30

(1 BP) Clermont	75 - 3	Dax

Stade Marcel-Michelin
Attendance: 15,827

16 May 2009
16:30

Mont-de-Marsan	8 - 60	Toulouse (1 BP)

Stade Guy Boniface
Attendance: 10,468

16 May 2009
16:30

(1 BP) Toulon	23 - 3	Montpellier

Stade Mayol
Attendance: 12,926

== Knock-out stages ==
=== Semi-finals ===
29 May 2009
20:45 CEST

Toulouse	9 – 19	Clermont
Pen: Elissalde (3/3) 21', 26', 31'	Report	Try: James 12' c Con: James (1/1); Pen: James (2/3) 4', 63'; Baby (2/2) 28', 45'

Stade Chaban-Delmas, Bordeaux
Attendance: 32,824
Referee: Christophe Berdos

30 May 2009
16:30 CEST

Perpignan	25 – 21	Stade Français
Tries: Porical 24' c Mermoz 48' c Candelon 62' m Con: Porical (2/3); Pen: Porical (2/6) 5', 36'	Report	Tries: Beauxis 50' m Parisse 69' c Con: Beauxis (1/2); Pen: Beauxis (2/4) 33', 55'; Drop: Beauxis 12'

Stade de Gerland, Lyon
Attendance: 40,377
Referee: Jérôme Garces

=== Final ===
6 June 2009
20:45 CEST

Perpignan	22 – 13	Clermont
Try: Marty 45' c Con: Porical (1/1); Pen: Porical (4/4) 40', 49, 61', 64'; Drop: Hume 15'	Report	Try: Nalaga 10' c Con: James (1/1); Pen: James (2/3) 19', 55'

Stade de France, Saint-Denis
Attendance: 79,205
Referee: Jean-Pierre Matheu

FB	15	(France) Jérôme Porical
RW	14	(France) Farid Sid
OC	13	(France) David Marty	(substituted off) 75'
IC	12	(France) Maxime Mermoz
LW	11	(France) Julien Candelon	(substituted off) 78'
FH	10	(South Africa) Gavin Hume
SH	9	(France) Nicolas Durand	(substituted off) 75'
N8	8	(France) Damien Chouly
OF	7	(France) Jean-Pierre Pérez
BF	6	(France) Grégory Le Corvec	(substituted off) 57'
RL	5	(France) Olivier Olibeau	(substituted off) 65'
LL	4	(Argentina) Rimas Álvarez Kairelis
TP	3	(France) Nicolas Mas (c)	(substituted off) 78'
HK	2	(Romania) Marius Țincu	(substituted off) 59'
LP	1	(England) Perry Freshwater	(substituted off) 59'
Replacements:
HK	16	(France) Guilhem Guirado	(substituted in) 59'
PR	17	(Tonga) Kisi Pulu	(substituted in) 59'
LK	18	(France) Guillaume Vilaceca	(substituted in) 65'
FL	19	(South Africa) Gerrie Britz	(substituted in) 57'
SH	20	(Spain) David Mélé	(substituted in) 75'
CE	21	(France) Jean-Philippe Grandclaude	(substituted in) 75'
WG	22	(South Africa) Philip Burger	(substituted in) 78'
PR	23	(Argentina) Sebastian Bozzi	(substituted in) 78'
	Coach: (France) Jacques Brunel

FB	15	(France) Anthony Floch
RW	14	(France) Benoît Baby
OC	13	(France) Aurélien Rougerie (c)
IC	12	(Italy) Gonzalo Canale
LW	11	(Fiji) Napolioni Nalaga	(substituted off) 77'
FH	10	(Australia) Brock James
SH	9	(France) Pierre Mignoni
N8	8	(France) Julien Bonnaire
OF	7	(France) Alexandre Audebert
BF	6	(Canada) Jamie Cudmore	(substituted off) 50'
RL	5	(France) Thibaut Privat	(substituted off) 55'
LL	4	(France) Julien Pierre
TP	3	(Argentina) Martín Scelzo	(substituted off) 30'
HK	2	(Argentina) Mario Ledesma	(substituted off) 65'
LP	1	(France) Thomas Domingo	(substituted off) 74'
Replacements:
HK	16	(France) Benoît Cabello	(substituted in) 65'
PR	17	(France) Laurent Emmanuelli	(substituted in) 74'
LK	18	(France) Loïc Jacquet	(substituted in) 55'
N8	19	(France) Elvis Vermeulen	(substituted in) 50'
SH	20	(Samoa) John Senio
FH	21	(Fiji) Seremaia Bai	(substituted in) 77'
CE	22	(Spain) Pierre-Emmanuel Garcia
PR	23	(Georgia (country)) Davit Zirakashvili	(substituted in) 30'
	Coach: (New Zealand) Vern Cotter

== Leading scorers ==
- Note that points scorers includes tries as well as conversions, penalties and drop goals.

=== Top points scorers ===
Rank	Player	Club	Points
1	(Australia) Brock James	Clermont	324
2	(England) Andy Goode	Brive	235
3	(France) Lionel Beauxis	Stade Français	212
4	(France) Benjamin Boyet	Bourgoin	207
5	(France) Romain Teulet	Castres	195
6	(France) Dimitri Yachvili	Biarritz	193
7	(France) Jérôme Porical	Perpignan	176
8	(France) Antoine Vignau-Tuquet	Dax	160
9	(France) Fabien Fortassin	Montauban	148
10	(Spain) Cédric Garcia	Bayonne	116

=== Top try scorers ===
Rank	Player	Club	Tries
1	(Fiji) Napolioni Nalaga	Clermont	21
2	(Fiji) Vilimoni Delasau	Montauban	10
2	(United States) Takudzwa Ngwenya	Biarritz	10
2	(South Africa) Sam Gerber	Bayonne	10
3	(France) Julien Candelon	Perpignan	9
3	(France) Anthony Floch	Clermont	9
4	(France) Mathieu Bastareaud	Stade Français	8
5	(New Zealand) Byron Kelleher	Toulouse	7
5	(France) Maxime Médard	Toulouse	7
5	(Fiji) Neumi Nanuku	Dax	7
5	(France) Aurélien Rougerie	Clermont	7

== Attendances ==
- Attendances do not include the semi-finals or final as these are at neutral venues.

Club	Home Games	Total	Average	Highest	Lowest	% Capacity
Bayonne	13	175,382	13,491	18,840	10,938	79%
Biarritz	13	118,151	9,089	13,104	7,000	61%
Bourgoin	13	91,679	7,052	18,014	4,428	67%
Brive	13	125,756	9,674	14,066	7,892	64%
Castres	13	103,075	7,929	9,451	6,615	69%
Clermont	13	190,622	14,663	15,853	12,207	88%
Dax	13	95,704	7,362	10,204	5,057	46%
Mont-de-Marsan	13	91,270	7,021	10,468	5,445	32%
Montauban	13	91,309	7,024	12,589	5,068	56%
Montpellier	13	150,402	11,569	14,570	9,503	73%
Perpignan	13	166,629	12,818	14,578	11,671	77%
Stade Français	13	325,539	25,041	79,842	7,443	79%
Toulon	13	206,631	15,895	56,953	11,482	91%
Toulouse	13	277,839	21,372	34,993	15,665	93%

== See also ==
- 2008–09 Heineken Cup
- 2008–09 Rugby Pro D2 season
