= 2009–10 Top 14 season =

French rugby union club competition

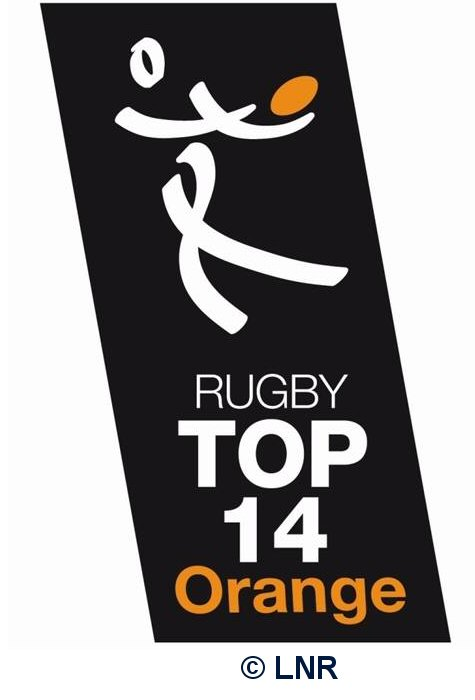
- Countries: France
- Champions: Clermont (1st title)
- Runners-up: Perpignan
- Relegated: Montauban; Albi
- Matches played: 187
- Attendance: 2,672,064 (average 14,289 per match)
- Highest attendance: 79,262 (play-offs); Perpignan v Clermont; 29 May 2010; 78,254 (league stage); Stade Français v Toulouse; 6 March 2010
- Lowest attendance: 4,813; Bourgoin v Montauban; 6 March 2010
- Tries scored: 597 (average 3.2 per match)
- Top point scorer: (France) Romain Teulet (263)
- Top try scorer: (South Africa) Sam Gerber (9)

The 2009–10 Top 14 competition was a French domestic rugby union club competition operated by the Ligue Nationale de Rugby (LNR). It began on August 14, 2009, with a match between Toulon and Stade Français at Stade Mayol in Toulon, and continued through to the final at the Stade de France on May 29, 2010.

This year's edition of the Top 14 welcomed Racing Métro, winners of the 2009 title in the second-level Pro D2, and Albi, victors in the 2009 promotion playoffs between the second- through fifth-placed teams in Pro D2, thus becoming the first team to achieve promotion to the Top 14 only one year after being relegated. They took the place of the two clubs from Landes, Dax and Mont-de-Marsan, relegated at the end of the 2008–09 Top 14. Mont-de-Marsan, which had been promoted to the Top 14 for 2008–09, finished bottom of the table and went down. The other newly promoted team in 2008–09, Toulon, finished ninth, sending Dax, who had already finished second-to-bottom the previous season before being allowed to stay in the Top 14 due to Albi's financial troubles, to Pro D2.

The two teams promoted for 2009–10 had very different results. Albi finished bottom of the table by a wide margin and went directly back to Pro D2. Racing Métro, on the other hand, finished sixth, giving them a berth in the newly expanded playoffs and a place in the 2010–11 Heineken Cup. Bayonne finished in the other relegation spot of 13th place, but were reprieved due to the financial problems of 12th-place Montauban.

The season ended with Clermont winning their first French national title in their nearly century-long history, defeating defending champions Perpignan 19–6 in a rematch of last season's final. This result ended decades of frustration for Les Jaunards and their supporters, who had previously tasted defeat in all 10 of their previous final-game appearances.

== Teams ==
Club	City (department)	Stadium	Capacity	Previous season
Albi	Albi (Tarn)	Stadium Municipal d'Albi	13,058	Promoted from Pro D2 (play-offs)
Bayonne	Bayonne (Pyrénées-Atlantiques)	Stade Jean Dauger (Note: Bayonne would also play one home game at the 32,076 capacity Estadio Anoeta in Donostia-San Sebastián, Spain.)	16,934	7th
Biarritz	Biarritz (Pyrénées-Atlantiques)	Parc des Sports Aguiléra (Note: Biarritz would also play two home games at the 32,076 capacity Estadio Anoeta in Donostia-San Sebastián, Spain.)	15,000	5th
Bourgoin	Bourgoin-Jallieu (Isère)	Stade Pierre Rajon (Note: Bourgon would also play one home game at the 20,088 capacity Stade des Alpes in Grenoble, and another at the 41,044 capacity Stade Gerland in Lyon.)	9,441	11th
Brive	Brive-la-Gaillarde (Corrèze)	Stade Amédée-Domenech	15,000	6th
Castres	Castres (Tarn)	Stade Pierre-Fabre	11,500	12th
Clermont	Clermont-Ferrand (Puy-de-Dôme)	Stade Marcel-Michelin	16,574	Runners up (3rd in league)
Montauban	Montauban (Tarn-et-Garonne)	Stade Sapiac	12,600	8th
Montpellier	Montpellier (Hérault)	Stade Yves-du-Manoir	15,789	10th
Perpignan	Perpignan (Pyrénées-Orientales)	Stade Aimé Giral	16,593	Champions (1st in league)
Racing Métro	Colombes (Hauts-de-Seine)	Stade Olympique Yves-du-Manoir	14,000	Promoted from Pro D2 (champions)
Stade Français	Paris, 16th arrondissement	Stade Jean-Bouin (Note: Stade Français would also play five home games at the 81,338 capacity Stade de France as well as one home game at 20,000 capacity Stade Sébastien Charléty.)	12,000	Semi-finals (4th in league)
Toulon	Toulon (Var)	Stade Mayol (Note: Toulon would also play two home games at the 67,394 capacity Stade Vélodrome in Marseille.)	13,800 (Note: Capacity of Stade Mayol up to 13,800 from 13,700 the previous season.)	9th
Toulouse	Toulouse (Haute-Garonne)	Stade Ernest-Wallon (Note: Toulouse would also play three home games at the 35,575 capacity Stadium Municipal.)	19,500	Semi-finals (2nd in league)

Locations of the 2009–10 Top 14 teams

=== Managerial changes ===
- On 8 September, Stade Français sacked head coach Ewen McKenzie and his assistant Christophe Dominici after a disastrous start to the season put the Parisians in the drop zone. Jacques Delmas and Didier Faugeron were named as co-head coaches. Dominici, who owns a small stake in the club, was expected to remain in some capacity. (Stade Français quickly exited relegation danger, scoring bonus-point wins in three of their next four matches.)
- On 26 October, struggling Brive, lying just above the drop zone at the time, sacked head coach Laurent Seigne. The move came a week after honorary club president Patrick Sébastien resigned. Ugo Mola, previously backs coach for Brive, was promoted to the head coaching position.
- On 7 November, Richard Dourthe resigned at Bayonne after a run of defeats put them in the drop zone. Club president Francis Salagoïty announced later that day that Thierry Mentières and Jean-Philippe Coyola would serve as co-head coaches.
- On 19 March, Stade Français announced a reorganisation effective at the end of the 2009–10 season. Michael Cheika, whose contract with Celtic League side Leinster expires at the end of this season, signed a three-year deal to become Director of Rugby and effective head coach from 2010 to 2011.

=== Captains and head coaches ===
Club	Captain	Head Coach
Albi	(France) Vincent Clément	(France) Jean Christophe Bacca (France) Philippe Laurent
Bayonne	(France) Rémy Martin	(France) Christian Gajan
Biarritz	(France) Jérôme Thion	(Australia) Jack Isaac (France) Jean-Michel Gonzalez
Bourgoin	(France) Julien Frier	(France) Éric Catinot (France) Xavier Péméja
Brive	(France) Fabrice Estebanez	(France) Ugo Mola (France) Christophe Laussucq
Castres	(France) Alexandre Albouy (France) Sébastien Tillous-Borde	(France) Laurent Labit (France) Laurent Travers
Clermont	(France) Aurélien Rougerie	(New Zealand) Vern Cotter
Montauban	(England) Matthew Clarkin	(France) Sébastien Calvet (France) Marc Raynaud
Montpellier	(France) Fulgence Ouedraogo	(South Africa) Warren Britz
Perpignan	(France) Nicolas Mas	(France) Jacques Brunel
Racing Métro	(France) Lionel Nallet	(France) Pierre Berbizier
Stade Français	(Argentina) Rodrigo Roncero	(France) Jacques Delmas (France) Didier Faugeron
Toulon	(South Africa) Joe van Niekerk	(France) Philippe Saint-André
Toulouse	(France) Thierry Dusautoir	(France) Guy Novès

== Competition format ==
Each club played every other club twice. The second half of the season is conducted in the same order as the first, with the club at home in the first half of the season away in the second. This season introduced a new format for the knockout stage: the top two teams qualify directly to the semifinals, while teams ranked from third to sixth qualify for a quarterfinal held at the homeground of the higher-ranked team. The semifinals are then held at neutral sites, with the final being played at the Stade de France. This replaced the classical format consisting of semifinals between the top four teams held at neutral sites.

Going into the season, the top six clubs were guaranteed of berths in the 2010–11 Heineken Cup. The winners of the 2009–10 Heineken Cup and European Challenge Cup are assured of berths in the 2010–11 Heineken Cup regardless of their league standing. This means that if a club finishes in the top six and wins one of the European competitions, the seventh-place team will gain a Heineken Cup berth. However, if French clubs win both competitions, only five clubs will qualify for the 2010–11 Heineken Cup via their league position because France is capped at seven Heineken Cup places. France can also secure a seventh berth if clubs from England's Guinness Premiership, also capped at seven Heineken Cup places, win both Cup competitions, and the top club in the European Rugby Club Rankings among those not already qualified for the Heineken Cup is from the Top 14. As it turned out, France earned a seventh berth when Toulouse won the Heineken Cup; because Toulouse had finished fourth on the regular-season table, the extra berth went to seventh-place Biarritz, who were also their opponent in the Heineken Cup final.

The bottom two teams are provisionally relegated to Pro D2, with the possibility of one or both of the bottom teams to be reprieved if a team above them fails a postseason financial audit (mandatory for all clubs in the league).

The LNR used a slightly different bonus points system from that used in most other rugby competitions. It trialled a new system in 2007–08 explicitly designed to prevent a losing team from earning more than one bonus point in a match, a system that also made it impossible for either team to earn a bonus point in a drawn match. The LNR chose to continue with this system for subsequent seasons.

France's bonus point system operated as follows:

- 4 points for a win.
- 2 points for a draw.
- 1 "bonus" point for winning while scoring at least 3 more tries than the opponent. This replaces the standard bonus point for scoring 4 tries regardless of the match result.
- 1 "bonus" point for losing by 7 points (or less).

== Table ==
Pos	Team	Pld	W	D	L	PF	PA	PD	B	Pts	Qualification or relegation
1	Perpignan (F)	26	17	0	9	582	412	+170	12	80 (Note: Perpignan finished first on the ladder, ahead of Toulon, based on a 5–4 edge in head-to-head competition points.)	Advance to playoff semi-finals Qualified for the 2010–11 Heineken Cup
2	Toulon (SF)	26	18	1	7	541	456	+85	6	80	Advance to playoff semi-finals Qualified for the 2010–11 Heineken Cup
3	Clermont (C)	26	15	3	8	644	414	+230	12	78	Advance to playoff quarter-finals Qualified for the 2010–11 Heineken Cup
4	Toulouse (SF)	26	15	1	10	524	359	+165	12	74	Advance to playoff quarter-finals Qualified for the 2010–11 Heineken Cup
5	Castres (QF)	26	14	3	9	542	398	+144	11	73	Advance to playoff quarter-finals Qualified for the 2010–11 Heineken Cup
6	Racing Métro (QF)	26	14	1	11	518	530	−12	6	64	Advance to playoff quarter-finals Qualified for the 2010–11 Heineken Cup
7	Biarritz (Note: It was possible that the sixth-place team on the table would not qualify for the Heineken Cup. However, it would occur only if French teams won both the Heineken Cup and Amlin Challenge Cup, and both of these teams finished outside the top six on the league table. This did not happen in 2009–10 because only one of the European cups was won by a French team (the Heineken Cup by Toulouse). Conversely, if the only French team to win a European trophy finished in the top six, or if both European trophy winners finished in the top six, the seventh-place finisher would receive a Heineken Cup berth. Since Toulouse finished fourth, Biarritz claimed the extra French berth.)	26	12	0	14	471	442	+29	11	59	Qualified for the 2010–11 Heineken Cup
8	Stade Français	26	10	4	12	600	572	+28	10	58 (Note: Stade Français finished eighth on the ladder, ahead of Brive, based on a 5–4 edge in head-to-head competition points.)	
9	Brive	26	11	2	13	459	513	−54	10	58	
10	Montpellier	26	13	0	13	453	574	−121	3	55	
11	Bourgoin	26	11	1	14	407	591	−184	4	50	
12	Montauban (Note: Normally, the bottom two teams are relegated. However, on 1 April, the LNR's financial watchdog, DNACG, called Bourgoin, Montauban, and Stade Français for a financial review. No action was taken against Bourgoin or Stade Français, but DNACG announced that Montauban would be relegated because the club could not assure that they could clear their €1.7 million financial shortfall, which reportedly stemmed from a loan the club took out to improve their ground, Stade Sapiac. Montauban could have appealed at the next DNACG meeting on 4 May, but the club wound up filing for bankruptcy on 26 April. The bankruptcy filing confirmed their relegation from the Top 14. They could potentially have been relegated to Fédérale 3, the fifth level of the French rugby pyramid, but ultimately were relegated to the third-level Fédérale 1. These developments meant that Bayonne, who finished second from bottom, escaped the drop.) (D, R)	26	10	2	14	422	525	−103	5	49	Relegated to the 2010–11 Rugby Pro D2
13	Bayonne	26	9	0	17	492	490	+2	11	47	
14	Albi (R)	26	4	0	22	349	728	−379	8	24	Relegated to the 2010–11 Rugby Pro D2

(C) Champion; (D) Disqualified; (R) Relegated

== Fixtures & Results ==
=== Round 1 ===
14 August 2009
20:45

Toulon	22–22	Stade Français

Stade Mayol
Attendance: 13,480

15 August 2009
16:00

(1 BP) Albi	13–19	Racing Métro

Stadium Municipal d'Albi
Attendance: 8,233

15 August 2009
16:00

Biarritz	12–24	Castres

Parc des Sports Aguiléra
Attendance: 11,530

15 August 2009
16:00

Bourgoin	28–37	Clermont

Stade Pierre Rajon
Attendance: 6,577

15 August 2009
16:00

(1 BP) Montauban	16–17	Toulouse

Stade Sapiac
Attendance: 10,622

15 August 2009
16:25

Perpignan	28–20	Bayonne

Stade Aimé Giral
Attendance: 13,714

15 August 2009
20:35

(1 BP) Brive	30–9	Montpellier

Stade Amédée-Domenech
Attendance: 10,098

=== Round 2 ===
21 August 2009
20:35

Bayonne	38–24	Stade Français

Estadio Anoeta, Donostia-San Sebastián, Spain
Attendance: 24,411

22 August 2009
16:00

(1 BP) Biarritz	39–6	Albi

Parc des Sports Aguiléra
Attendance: 9,850

22 August 2009
16:00

(1 BP) Clermont	37–16	Montauban

Stade Marcel-Michelin
Attendance: 14,333

22 August 2009
16:00

Montpellier	18–12	Perpignan (1 BP)

Stade Yves-du-Manoir
Attendance: 11,991

22 August 2009
16:00

(1 BP) Toulouse	38–0	Brive

Stade Ernest-Wallon
Attendance: 18,458

22 August 2009
16:25

Toulon	27–13	Racing Métro

Stade Mayol
Attendance: 13,499

22 August 2009
20:35

Castres	29–9	Bourgoin

Stade Pierre-Fabre
Attendance: 7,171

=== Round 3 ===
28 August 2009
19:00

Brive	9–9	Clermont

Stade Amédée-Domenech
Attendance: 11,289

29 August 2009
16:00

Montauban	P–P	Castres

Stade Sapiac

- Postponed after six Castres players were diagnosed with H1N1 flu. Game rescheduled to 16 September 2009.

29 August 2009
16:00

Racing Métro	18–9	Bayonne

Stade Olympique Yves-du-Manoir
Attendance: 7,638

29 August 2009
16:00

Stade Français	43–26	Montpellier

Stade Jean-Bouin
Attendance: 8,068

29 August 2009
16:25

Bourgoin	22–17	Biarritz (1 BP)

Stade Pierre Rajon
Attendance: 5,063

29 August 2009
16:25

Perpignan	17–15	Toulouse (1 BP)

Stade Aimé Giral
Attendance: 13,696

29 August 2009
20:35

(1 BP) Albi	9–15	Toulon

Stadium Municipal d'Albi
Attendance: 7,241

=== Round 4 ===
2 September 2009
19:30

Albi	P–P	Castres

Stadium Municipal d'Albi

- Game postponed due to the H1N1 outbreak in the Castres side. Game to be rescheduled for 29 September 2009.

2 September 2009
19:30

Bourgoin	17–13	Racing Métro (1 BP)

Stade Pierre Rajon
Attendance: 7,542

2 September 2009
19:30

Montpellier	22–18	Biarritz (1 BP)

Stade Yves-du-Manoir
Attendance: 9,826

2 September 2009
19:30

(1 BP) Stade Français	35–40	Montauban

Stade Jean-Bouin
Attendance: 7,008

2 September 2009
19:30

Toulon	26–21	Clermont

Stade Mayol
Attendance: 13,115

2 September 2009
19:30

Toulouse	21–17	Bayonne (1 BP)

Stade Ernest-Wallon
Attendance: 18,639

2 September 2009
20:30

Perpignan	21–9	Brive

Stade Aimé Giral
Attendance: 12,240

=== Round 5 ===
6 September 2009
15:00

(1 BP) Bayonne	53–6	Bourgoin

Stade Jean Dauger
Attendance: 11,140

6 September 2009
15:00

(1 BP) Brive	39–6	Albi

Stade Amédée-Domenech
Attendance: 8,824

6 September 2009
15:00

(1 BP) Castres	33–18	Montpellier

Stade Pierre-Fabre
Attendance: 6,953

6 September 2009
15:00

Montauban	21–18	Toulon (1 BP)

Stade Sapiac
Attendance: 7,444

6 September 2009
15:00

(1 BP) Racing Métro	14–18	Perpignan

Stade Olympique Yves-du-Manoir
Attendance: 7,910

6 September 2009
17:00

Biarritz	30–22	Stade Français

Parc des Sports Aguiléra
Attendance: 9,921

6 September 2009
21:00

Clermont	19–12	Toulouse (1 BP)

Stade Marcel-Michelin
Attendance: 15,803

=== Round 6 ===
11 September 2009
20:35

Bourgoin	17–6	Perpignan

Stade des Alpes, Grenoble
Attendance: 14,062

12 September 2009
14:30

Montauban	23–20	Brive (1 BP)

Stade Sapiac
Attendance: 6,766

12 September 2009
14:30

Montpellier	21–20	Toulon (1 BP)

Stade Yves-du-Manoir
Attendance: 11,825

12 September 2009
14:30

(1 BP) Stade Français	44–18	Castres

Stade Jean-Bouin
Attendance: 8,585

12 September 2009
14:30

Toulouse	19–13	Albi (1 BP)

Stade Ernest-Wallon
Attendance: 15,581

12 September 2009
16:25

Biarritz	12–6	Bayonne (1 BP)

Estadio Anoeta, Donostia-San Sebastián, Spain
Attendance: 28,933

12 September 2009
20:35

Clermont	30–22	Racing Métro

Stade Marcel-Michelin
Attendance: 15,701

=== Round 3 (rescheduled game) ===
16 September 2009
19:30

Montauban	18–18	Castres

Stade Sapiac
Attendance: 7,353

- Game rescheduled from 29 August 2009.

=== Round 7 ===
19 September 2009
14:30

Albi	8–40	Clermont (1 BP)

Stadium Municipal d'Albi
Attendance: 6,408

19 September 2009
14:30

(1 BP) Stade Français	20–6	Bourgoin

Stade Jean-Bouin
Attendance: 8,401

19 September 2009
16:25

(1 BP) Brive	12–15	Biarritz

Stade Amédée-Domenech
Attendance: 8,507

20 September 2009
14:30

Castres	9–6	Racing Métro (1 BP)

Stade Pierre-Fabre
Attendance: 7,485

20 September 2009
14:30

(1 BP) Perpignan	28–9	Montauban

Stade Aimé Giral
Attendance: 11,593

20 September 2009
16:05

Toulon	18–13	Toulouse (1 BP)

Stade Vélodrome, Marseille
Attendance: 55,091

20 September 2009
17:00

Bayonne	26–3	Montpellier

Stade Jean Dauger
Attendance: 11,023

=== Round 8 ===
25 September 2009
19:30

Albi	19–14	Bayonne (1 BP)

Stadium Municipal d'Albi
Attendance: 6,351

25 September 2009
20:35

Brive	11–9	Castres (1 BP)

Stade Amédée-Domenech
Attendance: 8,255

26 September 2009
14:15

(1 BP) Perpignan	19–3	Clermont

Stade Aimé Giral
Attendance: 13,691

26 September 2009
14:30

(1 BP) Biarritz	23–9	Toulon

Parc des Sports Aguiléra
Attendance: 9,434

26 September 2009
14:30

(1 BP) Montauban	12–15	Bourgoin

Stade Sapiac
Attendance: 6,332

26 September 2009
14:30

Racing Métro	18–14	Montpellier (1 BP)

Stade Olympique Yves-du-Manoir
Attendance: 6,846

26 September 2009
16:25

Toulouse	9–9	Stade Français

Stadium Municipal
Attendance: 32,176

=== Round 4 (rescheduled game) ===
29 September 2009
19:30

(1 BP) Albi	21–25 (Note: This was only the second Top 14 match to see both teams earn bonus points since France adopted its current bonus system in 2007–08.)	Castres (1 BP)

Stadium Municipal d'Albi
Attendance: 8,704

- Game rescheduled from 2 September 2009.

=== Round 9 ===
2 October 2009
20:45

(1 BP) Stade Français	44–16	Brive

Stade Jean-Bouin
Attendance: 8,892

3 October 2009
14:30

Castres	21–19	Toulon (1 BP)

Stade Pierre-Fabre
Attendance: 8,149

3 October 2009
14:30

(1 BP) Clermont	38–13	Bayonne

Stade Marcel-Michelin
Attendance: 14,827

3 October 2009
14:30

Montpellier	12–30	Toulouse

Stade Yves-du-Manoir
Attendance: 14,261

3 October 2009
14:30

Racing Métro	17–12	Montauban (1 BP)

Stade Olympique Yves-du-Manoir
Attendance: 6,446

3 October 2009
16:25

Biarritz	27–12	Perpignan

Parc des Sports Aguiléra
Attendance: 10,016

3 October 2009
20:45

Bourgoin	28–16	Albi

Stade Pierre Rajon
Attendance: 6,465

=== Round 10 ===
23 October 2009
20:45

Bayonne	6–15	Castres

Stade Jean Dauger
Attendance: 10,419

24 October 2009
14:15

Toulouse	23–3	Biarritz

Stade Ernest-Wallon
Attendance: 18,690

24 October 2009
14:30

Brive	10–18	Racing Métro

Stade Amédée-Domenech
Attendance: 8,476

24 October 2009
14:30

Montauban	20–6	Albi

Stade Sapiac
Attendance: 6,908

24 October 2009
14:30

Montpellier	16–9	Clermont (1 BP)

Stade Yves-du-Manoir
Attendance: 12,292

24 October 2009
14:30

(1 BP) Toulon	46–28	Bourgoin

Stade Mayol
Attendance: 12,774

24 October 2009
16:25

(1 BP) Stade Français	14–20	Perpignan

Stade de France
Attendance: 76,972

=== Round 11 ===
30 October 2009
20:45

Perpignan	17–15	Castres (1 BP)

Stade Aimé Giral
Attendance: 13,948

31 October 2009
14:30

(1 BP) Albi	15–18	Montpellier

Stadium Municipal d'Albi
Attendance: 6,461

31 October 2009
14:30

(1 BP) Bayonne	8–14	Toulon

Stade Jean Dauger
Attendance: 15,095

31 October 2009
14:30

Bourgoin	14–14	Brive

Stade Pierre Rajon
Attendance: 6,269

31 October 2009
14:30

Racing Métro	27–20	Toulouse (1 BP)

Stade Olympique Yves-du-Manoir
Attendance: 13,140

31 October 2009
16:25

Clermont	19–19	Stade Français

Stade Marcel-Michelin
Attendance: 15,854

31 October 2009
20:45

Montauban	14–5	Biarritz

Stade Sapiac
Attendance: 8,579

=== Round 12 ===
5 November 2009
19:30

Biarritz	P–P	Racing Métro

Parc des Sports Aguiléra

- Postponed due to unplayable pitch. Game rescheduled to 2 December 2009. (Note: The game was original rescheduled to 1 December 2009 but this was changed to the 2nd after it was noted that the original makeup date potentially violated LNR and French Rugby Federation (FFR) regulations requiring a minimum of 72 hours between matches.)

5 November 2009
19:30

Brive	19–14	Bayonne (1 BP)

Stade Amédée-Domenech
Attendance: 8,167

5 November 2009
19:30

Castres	9–9	Clermont

Stade Pierre-Fabre
Attendance: 7,492

5 November 2009
19:30

Montpellier	19–0	Montauban

Stade Yves-du-Manoir
Attendance: 9,094

5 November 2009
19:30

Stade Français	23–18	Albi (1 BP)

Stade Jean-Bouin
Attendance: 7,220

5 November 2009
19:30

(1 BP) Toulouse	41–3	Bourgoin

Stade Ernest-Wallon
Attendance: 15,695

5 November 2009
21:00

(1 BP) Perpignan	25–9	Toulon

Stade Aimé Giral
Attendance: 13,539

=== Round 13 ===
20 November 2009
19:00

Albi	24–23	Perpignan (1 BP)

Stadium Municipal d'Albi
Attendance: 6,731

21 November 2009
14:30

(1 BP) Bayonne	38–13	Montauban

Stade Jean Dauger
Attendance: 11,174

21 November 2009
14:30

(1 BP) Bourgoin	20–23	Montpellier

Stade Pierre Rajon
Attendance: 5,350

21 November 2009
14:30

Racing Métro	20–18	Stade Français (1 BP)

Stade Olympique Yves-du-Manoir
Attendance: 9,756

21 November 2009
14:30

Toulon	19–10	Brive

Stade Mayol
Attendance: 12,675

21 November 2009
16:05

(1 BP) Castres	30–10	Toulouse

Stade Pierre-Fabre
Attendance: 9,878

21 November 2009
20:30

(1 BP) Clermont	13–16	Biarritz

Stade Marcel-Michelin
Attendance: 15,187

=== Round 14 ===
27 November 2009
19:45

(1 BP) Stade Français	18–22	Toulon

Stade Jean-Bouin
Attendance: 8,787

27 November 2009
21:00

(1 BP) Castres	34–6	Biarritz

Stade Pierre-Fabre
Attendance: 7,635

27 November 2009
21:00

Racing Métro	9–6	Albi (1 BP)

Stade Olympique Yves-du-Manoir
Attendance: 6,354

28 November 2009
14:30

Montpellier	3–25	Brive (1 BP)

Stade Yves-du-Manoir
Attendance: 9,004

28 November 2009
14:30

Toulouse	17–12	Montauban (1 BP)

Stade Ernest-Wallon
Attendance: 17,390

28 November 2009
16:25

Bayonne	P–P	Perpignan

Stade Jean Dauger

- Game postponed after Perpignan reported that seven of their traveling party (including both players and coaches) were diagnosed with H1N1 flu. Game to be rescheduled for 5 February 2010.

28 November 2009
19:00

(1 BP) Clermont	32–8	Bourgoin

Stade Marcel-Michelin
Attendance: 12,131

=== Round 12 (rescheduled game) ===
2 December 2009
19:00

(1 BP) Biarritz	19–23	Racing Métro

Parc des Sports Aguiléra
Attendance: 8,977

- Game rescheduled from 5 November 2009.

=== Round 15 ===
4 December 2009
20:45

Montauban	20–16	Clermont (1 BP)

Stade Sapiac
Attendance: 6,581

5 December 2009
14:30

Bourgoin	15–9	Castres (1 BP)

Stade Pierre Rajon
Attendance: 4,976

5 December 2009
14:30

Perpignan	29–3	Montpellier

Stade Aimé Giral
Attendance: 12,410

5 December 2009
16:25

(1 BP) Stade Français	34–10	Bayonne

Stade de France
Attendance: 69,850

6 December 2009
15:00

Albi	20–9	Biarritz

Stadium Municipal d'Albi
Attendance: 6,617

6 December 2009
15:00

Brive	27–21	Toulouse (1 BP)

Stade Amédée-Domenech
Attendance: 10,638

6 December 2009
17:05

Racing Métro	28–15	Toulon

Stade Olympique Yves-du-Manoir
Attendance: 8,728

=== Round 16 ===
30 December 2009
18:45

Montpellier	25–23	Stade Français (1 BP)

Stade Yves-du-Manoir
Attendance: 11,936

30 December 2009
19:00

(1 BP) Bayonne	19–23	Racing Métro

Stade Jean Dauger
Attendance: 14,138

30 December 2009
19:00

Biarritz	23–6	Bourgoin

Parc des Sports Aguiléra
Attendance: 8,786

30 December 2009
19:00

Castres	30–7	Montauban

Stade Pierre-Fabre
Attendance: 8,052

30 December 2009
19:00

(1 BP) Clermont	52–10	Brive

Stade Marcel-Michelin
Attendance: 15,741

30 December 2009
19:00

Toulon	41–13	Albi

Stade Mayol
Attendance: 13,502

30 December 2009
20:45

Toulouse	22–11	Perpignan

Stadium Municipal
Attendance: 33,414

=== Round 17 ===
3 January 2010
15:00

(1 BP) Biarritz	26–10	Montpellier

Parc des Sports Aguiléra
Attendance: 8,461

3 January 2010
15:00

(1 BP) Brive	29–9	Perpignan

Stade Amédée-Domenech
Attendance: 8,622

3 January 2010
15:00

(1 BP) Castres	41–10	Albi

Stade Pierre-Fabre
Attendance: 9,485

3 January 2010
15:00

Montauban	6–6	Stade Français

Stade Sapiac
Attendance: 7,094

3 January 2010
15:00

(1 BP) Racing Métro	17–18	Bourgoin

Stade Olympique Yves-du-Manoir
Attendance: 8,834

3 January 2010
17:00

(1 BP) Clermont	39–3	Toulon

Stade Marcel-Michelin
Attendance: 15,409

3 January 2010
20:45

(1 BP) Bayonne	13–15	Toulouse

Stade Jean Dauger
Attendance: 13,503

=== Round 18 ===
8 January 2010
20:45

(1 BP) Perpignan	31–12	Racing Métro

Stade Aimé Giral
Attendance: 12,425

9 January 2010
14:30

(1 BP) Albi	15–17	Brive

Stadium Municipal d'Albi
Attendance: 5,835

9 January 2010
14:30

Bourgoin	P–P	Bayonne

Stade Pierre Rajon

- Postponed due to unplayable conditions. Game rescheduled to 27 February 2010.

9 January 2010
14:30

Montpellier	15–0	Castres

Stade Yves-du-Manoir
Attendance: 9,633

9 January 2010
14:30

Toulon	18–7	Montauban

Stade Mayol
Attendance: 11,518

9 January 2010
16:25

Stade Français	25–15	Biarritz

Stade de France
Attendance: 76,879

10 January 2010
20:45

(1 BP) Toulouse	15–16	Clermont

Stadium Municipal
Attendance: 24,000

=== Round 19 ===
27 January 2010
19:00

Brive	19–14	Montauban (1 BP)

Stade Amédée-Domenech
Attendance: 7,996

27 January 2010
19:00

Racing Métro	33–24	Clermont

Stade Olympique Yves-du-Manoir
Attendance: 7,993

27 January 2010
19:00

(1 BP) Toulon	31–19	Montpellier

Stade Mayol
Attendance: 11,169

28 January 2010
20:45

Castres	32–14	Stade Français

Stade Pierre-Fabre
Attendance: 8,040

28 January 2010
19:00

Albi	6–24	Toulouse (1 BP)

Stadium Municipal d'Albi
Attendance: 7,726

28 January 2010
19:00

(1 BP) Perpignan	49–20	Bourgoin

Stade Aimé Giral
Attendance: 11,535

28 January 2010
20:45

Bayonne	15–0	Biarritz

Stade Jean Dauger
Attendance: 15,407

=== Round 14 (rescheduled game) ===
5 February 2010
20:45

Bayonne	13–30	Perpignan (1 BP)

Stade Jean Dauger
Attendance: 13,449

- Game rescheduled from 28 November 2009.

=== Round 20 ===
19 February 2010
20:45

Biarritz	12–6	Brive (1 BP)

Parc des Sports Aguiléra
Attendance: 8,013

20 February 2010
14:15

Racing Métro	24–24	Castres

Stade Olympique Yves-du-Manoir
Attendance: 9,556

20 February 2010
14:30

Bourgoin	13–22	Stade Français

Stade Pierre Rajon
Attendance: 6,886

20 February 2010
14:30

(1 BP) Clermont	45–18	Albi

Stade Marcel-Michelin
Attendance: 14,368

20 February 2010
14:30

Montauban	16–13	Perpignan (1 BP)

Stade Sapiac
Attendance: 7,718

20 February 2010
14:30

(1 BP) Montpellier	16–22	Bayonne

Stade Yves-du-Manoir
Attendance: 10,390

20 February 2010
16:25

(1 BP) Toulouse	3–6	Toulon

Stade Ernest-Wallon
Attendance: 18,699

=== Round 18 (rescheduled game) ===
27 February 2010
20:45

Bourgoin	12–6	Bayonne (1 BP)

Stade Pierre Rajon
Attendance: 8,000

- Game rescheduled from 9 January 2010.

=== Round 21 ===
5 March 2010
20:45

Clermont	22–17	Perpignan (1 BP)

Stade Marcel-Michelin
Attendance: 15,815

6 March 2010
14:30

(1 BP) Bayonne	46–13	Albi

Stade Jean Dauger
Attendance: 12,041

6 March 2010
14:30

Bourgoin	22–14	Montauban

Stade Pierre Rajon
Attendance: 4,813

6 March 2010
14:30

(1 BP) Castres	35–10	Brive

Stade Pierre-Fabre
Attendance: 7,944

6 March 2010
14:30

Toulon	21–20	Biarritz (1 BP)

Stade Mayol
Attendance: 13,630

6 March 2010
16:25

Stade Français	0–29	Toulouse

Stade de France
Attendance: 78,254

6 March 2010
20:45

Montpellier	22–19	Racing Métro (1 BP)

Stade Yves-du-Manoir
Attendance: 12,032

=== Round 22 ===
12 March 2010
19:00

Albi	7–17	Bourgoin

Stadium Municipal d'Albi
Attendance: 5,680

12 March 2010
19:00

Bayonne	22–13	Clermont

Stade Jean Dauger
Attendance: 13,357

12 March 2010
19:00

Brive	26–14	Stade Français

Stade Amédée-Domenech
Attendance: 9,677

12 March 2010
19:00

Toulon	19–6	Castres

Stade Mayol
Attendance: 13,040

12 March 2010
19:00

(1 BP) Toulouse	34–3	Montpellier

Stade Ernest-Wallon
Attendance: 15,001

12 March 2010
20:45

Perpignan	19–14	Biarritz (1 BP)

Stade Aimé Giral
Attendance: 13,252

13 March 2010
20:45

Montauban	45–31	Racing Métro

Stade Sapiac
Attendance: 8,014

=== Round 23 ===
26 March 2010
20:45

(1 BP) Bourgoin	9–13	Toulon

Stade Pierre Rajon
Attendance: 7,970

27 March 2010
14:15

Racing Métro	25–18	Brive (1 BP)

Stade Olympique Yves-du-Manoir
Attendance: 10,792

27 March 2010
14:30

Albi	12–26	Montauban

Stadium Municipal d'Albi
Attendance: 6,569

27 March 2010
14:30

Castres	26–10	Bayonne

Stade Pierre-Fabre
Attendance: 8,216

27 March 2010
14:30

(1 BP) Clermont	41–3	Montpellier

Stade Marcel-Michelin
Attendance: 15,740

27 March 2010
14:30

(1 BP) Perpignan	44–23	Stade Français

Stade Aimé Giral
Attendance: 14,345

27 March 2010
16:25

Biarritz	26–10	Toulouse

Estadio Anoeta, Donostia-San Sebastián, Spain
Attendance: 21,948

=== Round 24 ===
2 April 2010
20:45

Toulouse	28–23	Racing Métro (1 BP)

Stade Ernest-Wallon
Attendance: 18,574

3 April 2010
14:30

(1 BP) Biarritz	42–13	Montauban

Parc des Sports Aguiléra
Attendance: 11,000

3 April 2010
14:30

Brive	25–15	Bourgoin

Stade Amédée-Domenech
Attendance: 9,360

3 April 2010
14:30

(1 BP) Montpellier	62–15	Albi

Stade Yves-du-Manoir
Attendance: 11,456

3 April 2010
14:30

(1 BP) Toulon	31–13	Bayonne

Stade Mayol
Attendance: 13,805

3 April 2010
16:25

Stade Français	19–10	Clermont

Stade de France
Attendance: 72,877

3 April 2010
20:45

(1 BP) Castres	11–17	Perpignan

Stade Pierre-Fabre
Attendance: 9,943

=== Round 25 ===
16 April 2010
20:45

Clermont	25–19	Castres (1 BP)

Stade Marcel-Michelin
Attendance: 15,852

17 April 2010
14:30

Albi	38–24	Stade Français

Stadium Municipal d'Albi
Attendance: 6,996

17 April 2010
14:30

Bayonne	33–25	Brive

Stade Jean Dauger
Attendance: 16,883

17 April 2010
14:30

Montauban	6–19	Montpellier

Stade Sapiac
Attendance: 7,500

17 April 2010
14:30

Bourgoin	15–13	Toulouse (1 BP)

Stade Gerland, Lyon
Attendance: 29,876

17 April 2010
16:25

Toulon	33–23	Perpignan

Stade Vélodrome, Marseille
Attendance: 57,392

17 April 2010
20:45

Racing Métro	29–22	Biarritz (1 BP)

Stade Olympique Yves-du-Manoir
Attendance: 13,425

=== Round 26 ===
24 April 2010
16:25

(1 BP) Biarritz	19–26	Clermont

Parc des Sports Aguiléra
Attendance: 11,017

24 April 2010
16:25

(1 BP) Brive	21–26	Toulon

Stade Amédée-Domenech
Attendance: 13,847

24 April 2010
16:25

Montauban	22–8	Bayonne

Stade Sapiac
Attendance: 9,198

24 April 2010
16:25

Montpellier	34–27	Bourgoin (1 BP)

Stade Yves-du-Manoir
Attendance: 13,346

24 April 2010
16:25

(1 BP) Perpignan	44–0	Albi

Stade Aimé Giral
Attendance: 14,256

24 April 2010
16:25

(1 BP) Stade Français	41 -17	Racing Métro

Stade Sébastien Charléty
Attendance: 19,508

24 April 2010
16:25

Toulouse	25–17	Castres

Stade Ernest-Wallon
Attendance: 18,732

== Playoffs ==
Quarter-finals
4	Toulouse	35
5	Castres	12
3	Clermont	21
6	Racing Métro	17

Semi-finals
1	Perpignan	21
4	Toulouse	13
2	Toulon	29
3	Clermont (a.e.t.)	35

Final
1	Perpignan	6
3	Clermont	19

All times are in Central European Summer Time (UTC+2).

=== Quarter-finals ===
7 May 2010
21:00

Clermont	21–17	Racing Métro
Pen: James (2/4) 3', 21'; Parra (5/5) 48', 60', 64', 70', 75'	Report	Try: Cronjé 38' m Pen: Wisniewski (1/2) 41'; Steyn (1/1) 46'; Drop: Wisniewski 53'; Steyn 62'

Stade Marcel-Michelin, Clermont-Ferrand
Attendance: 15,811
Referee: Pascal Gauzere

8 May 2010
16:30

Toulouse	35–12	Castres
Try: Médard 2' c Clerc (2) 15' c, 64' m David 69' c Con: Élissalde (2/2); Fritz (1/2); Pen: Élissalde (3/4) 26', 52', 59'	Report	Pen: Teulet (4/4) 20', 31', 41', 55'

Stadium Municipal, Toulouse
Attendance: 34,594
Referee: Jean-Pierre Matheu

=== Semi-finals ===
14 May 2010
21:00

Perpignan	21–13	Toulouse
Pen: Porical (7/8) 9', 17', 22', 42', 51', 62', 78'	Report	Try: Bézy 7' c Con: Skrela (1/1); Pen: Skrela (2/2) 18', 26'

Stade de la Mosson, Montpellier
Attendance: 32,204
Referee: Romain Poite

15 May 2010
16:30

Toulon	29–35 (a.e.t.)	Clermont
Try: Williams 73' c Cibray 96' c Con: Wilkinson (2/2); Pen: Wilkinson (4/6) 3', 32', 63', 77'; Drop: Wilkinson (1/1) 14'	Report	Try: Zirakashvili 69' c Malzieu 93' c Con: Parra (1/1); James (1/1); Pen: Parra (4/5) 27', 47', 49', 58'; James (1/1) 89'; Drop: Floch (1/1) 6'; James (1/2) 91'

Stade Geoffroy-Guichard, Saint-Étienne
Attendance: 33,609
Referee: Jérôme Garces

=== Final ===
29 May 2010
21:00

Perpignan	6–19	Clermont
Pen: Porical (2/6) 21', 27'	Report	Try: Nalaga 17' c Con: Parra (1/1); Pen: Parra (3/6) 12', 29', 63'; Drop: Floch (1/1) 69'

Stade de France, Saint-Denis
Attendance: 79,262
Referee: Christophe Berdos

FB	15	(France) Jérôme Porical
RW	14	(France) Christophe Manas
OC	13	(France) David Marty
IC	12	(France) Maxime Mermoz
LW	11	(France) Adrien Planté
FH	10	(South Africa) Gavin Hume	(substituted off) 53'
SH	9	(France) Nicolas Durand	(substituted off) 59'
N8	8	(Samoa) Henry Tuilagi	(substituted off) 45' (substituted on) 52' (substituted off) 56'
OF	7	(France) Jean-Pierre Pérez	(substituted off) 52'
BF	6	(Romania) Ovidiu Tonița
RL	5	(Cameroon) Robins Tchale-Watchou	(substituted off) 69'
LL	4	(France) Olivier Olibeau
TP	3	(France) Nicolas Mas (c)	(substituted off) 73'
HK	2	(France) Guilhem Guirado	(substituted off) 54'
LP	1	(England) Perry Freshwater	(substituted off) 63'
Replacements:
HK	16	(Romania) Marius Țincu	(substituted on) 54'
PR	17	(France) Jérôme Schuster	(substituted on) 63'
LK	18	(France) Guillaume Vilaceca	(substituted on) 56'
FL	19	(France) Grégory Le Corvec	(substituted on) 45'
SH	20	(Spain) David Mélé	(substituted on) 59'
CE	21	(France) Jean-Philippe Grandclaude	(substituted on) 69'
FH	22	(France) Nicolas Laharrague	(substituted on) 53'
PR	23	(Tonga) Kisi Pulu	(substituted on) 73'
Coach:
(France) Jacques Brunel

FB	15	(France) Anthony Floch
RW	14	(Fiji) Napolioni Nalaga
OC	13	(France) Aurélien Rougerie (c)
IC	12	(South Africa) Marius Joubert
LW	11	(France) Julien Malzieu
FH	10	(Australia) Brock James
SH	9	(France) Morgan Parra
N8	8	(France) Elvis Vermeulen
OF	7	(France) Alexandre Lapandry	(substituted off) 59'
BF	6	(France) Julien Bonnaire
RL	5	(France) Thibaut Privat	(substituted off) 52'
LL	4	(Canada) Jamie Cudmore
TP	3	(Argentina) Martín Scelzo	(substituted off) 43' (substituted on) 72'
HK	2	(Argentina) Mario Ledesma	(substituted off) 70'
LP	1	(France) Thomas Domingo
Replacements:
HK	16	(France) Benoît Cabello	(substituted on) 70'
PR	17	(France) Vincent Debaty
LK	18	(France) Julien Pierre	(substituted on) 52'
FL	19	(France) Alexandre Audebert	(substituted on) 59'
SH	20	(New Zealand) Kevin Senio
FH	21	(Samoa) Tasesa Lavea
CE	22	(Italy) Gonzalo Canale
PR	23	(Georgia (country)) Davit Zirakashvili	(substituted on) 43' (substituted off) 72'
Coach:
(New Zealand) Vern Cotter

== Leading scorers ==
- Note that points scorers includes tries as well as conversions, penalties and drop goals.

=== Top points scorers ===
Rank	Player	Club	Points
1	(France) Romain Teulet	Castres	263
2	(England) Jonny Wilkinson	Toulon	230
3	(Australia) Brock James	Clermont	225
4	(France) Jonathan Wisniewski	Racing Métro	183
5	(France) Jérôme Porical	Perpignan	181
6	(Argentina) Federico Todeschini	Montpellier	167
7	(France) Cédric Rosalen	Montauban	166
8	(France) Lionel Beauxis	Stade Français	159
9	(France) Benjamin Boyet	Bourgoin	159
10	(France) Dimitri Yachvili	Biarritz	150

=== Top try scorers ===
Rank	Player	Club	Tries
1	(South Africa) Sam Gerber	Bayonne	9
2	(Fiji) Napolioni Nalaga	Clermont	8
3	(France) Vincent Clerc	Toulouse	7
3	(France) Benjamin Fall	Bayonne	7
3	(France) Anthony Floch	Clermont	7
3	(France) Mark Gasnier	Stade Français	7
3	(United States) Takudzwa Ngwenya	Biarritz	7
3	(France) François Trinh Duc	Montpellier	7
4	(Fiji) Sireli Bobo	Racing Métro	6
4	(New Zealand) Chris Masoe	Castres	6
4	(France) Jean-Baptiste Peyras-Loustalet	Bayonne	6
4	(England) Ollie Phillips	Stade Français	6
4	(France) Jérôme Porical	Perpignan	6
4	(France) Farid Sid	Perpignan	6
4	(Samoa) Iosefa Tekori	Castres	6

== Awards ==
=== Player of the Month ===
Players were selected by fan vote from a three-player shortlist on the official LNR site, and the results are posted roughly in the middle of the following month.

Month	Player of the Month	Club
August	Joe van Niekerk	Toulon
September	Jonny Wilkinson	Toulon
October	Julien Candelon	Perpignan
November	Not awarded — Test window	

== Attendances ==
- Attendances do not include the semi-finals or final as these are at neutral venues.

Club	Home Games	Total	Average	Highest	Lowest	% Capacity
Albi	13	89,552	6,889	8,704	5,680	53%
Bayonne	13	182,040	14,003	24,411	10,419	77%
Biarritz	13	157,886	12,145	28,933	8,013	67%
Bourgoin	13	113,849	8,758	29,876	4,813	68%
Brive	13	123,756	9,520	13,847	7,996	63%
Castres	13	106,443	8,188	9,943	6,953	71%
Clermont (Note: Clermont's attendance figures include home quarter final playoff game.)	14	212,572	15,184	15,854	12,131	92%
Montauban	13	100,109	7,701	10,622	6,332	61%
Montpellier	13	147,086	11,314	14,261	9,004	72%
Perpignan	13	170,644	13,126	14,345	11,535	79%
Racing Métro	13	117,418	9,032	13,425	6,354	65%
Stade Français	13	451,301	34,715	78,254	7,008	79%
Toulon	13	254,690	19,592	57,392	11,169	92%
Toulouse (Note: Toulouse's attendance figures include home quarter final playoff game.)	14	299,643	21,403	34,594	15,001	89%

== See also ==
- 2009–10 Heineken Cup
- 2009–10 Rugby Pro D2 season
