= 2007–08 Top 14 Final =

== Match details ==
Clermont	Toulouse

28 June 2008
21:00 UTC+2

Clermont Auvergne	20 – 26	Toulouse
Tries: Rougerie 20'; Zirakashvili 80'; Cons: James (2/2); Pen: James (2/2) 30', 69'	(Report)	Tries: Servat 17'; Médard 60'; Con: Élissalde (2/2); Pen: Élissalde (2/3) 33', 56'; Kunavore (1/1) 74'; Courrent (1/1) 79'

Stade de France, Saint-Denis
Referee: Eric Darrière (France)

CLERMONT AUVERGNE:
FB	15	(France) Benoît Baby	(substituted off) 65'
RW	14	(France) Aurélien Rougerie (c)
OC	13	(Italy) Gonzalo Canale	(substituted off) 52'
IC	12	(South Africa) Marius Joubert
LW	11	(Fiji) Napolioni Nalaga
FH	10	(Australia) Brock James
SH	9	(France) Pierre Mignoni
N8	8	(France) Elvis Vermeulen	(substituted off) 62'
OF	7	(France) Alexandre Audebert
BF	6	(France) Julien Bonnaire
RL	5	(France) Thibault Privat	(substituted off) 66'
LL	4	(Canada) Jamie Cudmore	(substituted off) 56'
TP	3	(France) Laurent Emmanuelli	(substituted off) 52'
HK	2	(Argentina) Mario Ledesma	(substituted off) 68'
LP	1	(Georgia (country)) Davit Zirakashvili
Replacements:
HK	16	(South Africa) John Smit	(substituted in) 68'
PR	17	(France) Thomas Domingo	(substituted in) 52'
LK	18	(France) Loïc Jacquet	(substituted in) 66'
LK	19	(France) Christophe Samson	(substituted in) 56'
N8	20	(New Zealand) Sam Broomhall	(substituted in) 62'
CE	21	(Fiji) Seremaia Bai	(substituted in) 52'
FB	22	(France) Anthony Floch	(substituted in) 65'
Coach:
(New Zealand) Vern Cotter

TOULOUSE:
FB	15	(France) Maxime Médard
RW	14	(France) Yves Donguy
OC	13	(Fiji) Maleli Kunavore	(substituted off) 78'
IC	12	(France) Yannick Jauzion
LW	11	(France) Cédric Heymans
FH	10	(France) Jean-Baptiste Élissalde	(substituted off) 62'
SH	9	(New Zealand) Byron Kelleher
N8	8	(South Africa) Shaun Sowerby	(substituted off) 76'
OF	7	(France) Thierry Dusautoir	(substituted off) 56'
BF	6	(France) Jean Bouilhou (c)
RL	5	(France) Fabien Pelous	(substituted off) 65'
LL	4	(Argentina) Patricio Albacete
TP	3	(Argentina) Omar Hasan
HK	2	(France) William Servat	(substituted off) 78'
LP	1	(South Africa) Daan Human	(substituted off) 56'
Replacements:
PR	16	(France) Jean-Baptiste Poux	(substituted in) 56'
HK	17	(Argentina) Alberto Basualdo	(substituted in) 78'
LK	18	(France) Romain Millo-Chluski	(substituted in) 65'
FL	19	(France) Grégory Lamboley	(substituted in) 76'
N8	20	(Tonga) Finau Maka	(substituted in) 56'
FH	21	(France) Valentin Courrent	(substituted in) 78'
CE	22	(France) Florian Fritz	(substituted in) 62'
Coach:
(France) Guy Novès

Man of the Match:
(New Zealand) Byron Kelleher

Touch judges:
(France) Christophe Berdos
(France) Pascal Gauzere
Television match official:
(France) Daniel Gillet
Assessors:
(France) Clément Grau
(France) Daniel Irazoqui
(France) Bernard Perez

2007-08 Top 14 Champions

France
Stade Toulousain seventeenth title
