= Omar Hasan =

Argentine rugby union player (born 1971)

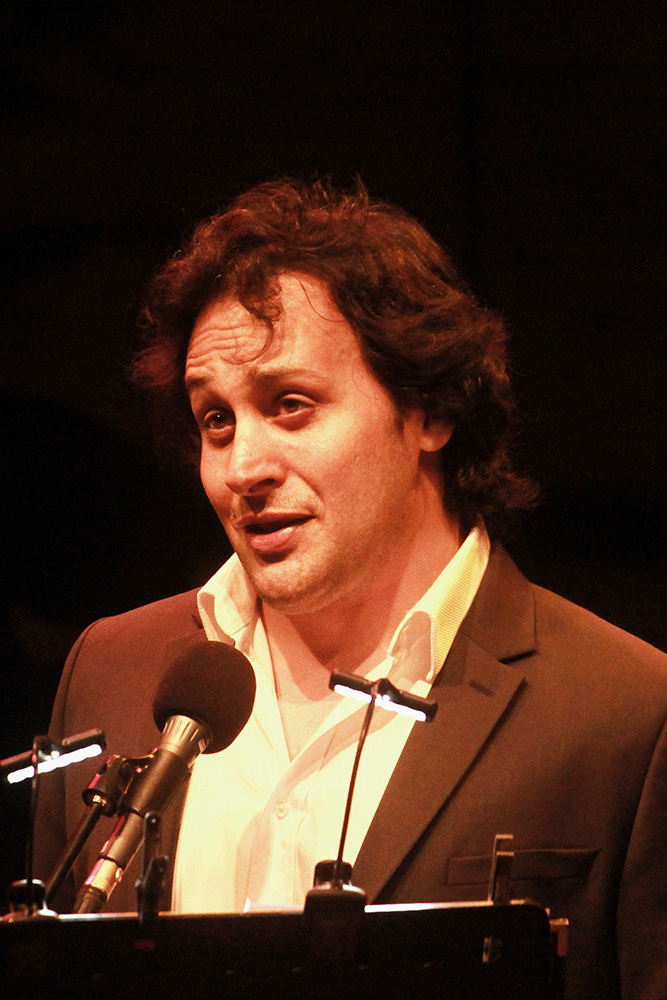
- Omar Hasan performing as a baritone in Toulouse (2013)
- Born: Omar José Hasan Jalil; 21 April 1971 (age 55) San Miguel de Tucumán, Argentina
- Height: 1.83 m (6 ft 0 in)
- Weight: 115 kg (18 st 2 lb)

Rugby union career
- Position: Prop
Amateur team(s)
Years	Team	Apps	(Points)
1990-1996	Natación		
Senior career
Years	Team	Apps	(Points)
1997	Wellington		
1998	Brumbies		
1999-2001	Natación		
2001-2004	Agen	47	(15)
2004-2008	Toulouse	87	(5)
- Correct as of 2 October 2009
International career
Years	Team	Apps	(Points)
1995-2007	Argentina	65	(20)
- Correct as of 2 October 2009

Omar José Hasan Jalil (born 21 April 1971 in Tucumán) is an Argentine retired rugby union footballer. He last played for Stade Toulousain in the domestic French club competition, the Top 14. He has also played for Argentina, usually as a prop. He has played in over 50 Tests for the Pumas and has an international career with Argentina spanning more than a decade. He is of Lebanese background.

== Rugby career ==
Hasan made his international debut for Argentina on 4 March 1995 against fellow South Americans Uruguay. Argentina won the game, which was played in Buenos Aires and was a part of the Pan-American Championship. The final score was 44 to three to Argentina. Hasan scored a try in the game. He was capped another four times the following season in games against Uruguay, the Springboks and Canada. He came off the bench in games against England and the All Blacks.

He played nine Tests for Argentina in 1998. The following year he was included in Argentina's squad for the 1999 Rugby World Cup in Wales. He was capped twice the following season in games against South Africa and the English. He played three games for Argentina in 2001, against Wales, Scotland and the All Blacks. He was capped six times in 2002, and then the following year played in his second world cup, at the 2003 Rugby World Cup in Australia.

He was capped five times in 2004, three times during June, against Wales and the All Blacks, and twice in November, against France and Ireland. He was capped five times the following season. In 2006 he played in Argentina' mid-year Test against the All Blacks.

In 2007 he was selected to join the Argentina squad for the 2007 Rugby World Cup in France.

His final match came in the 2008 Top 14 Final, which he started for his club, Toulouse, and played the entire 80 minutes. Toulouse were crowned champions, ending Hasan's career on a winning note. Whilst at Toulouse he also won the 2005 Heineken Cup.

== Music ==
Hasan is also a baritone, loves Opera and is finishing his debut album in which operistic music is mixed with Tango and elements from Argentine folk music.
