= Napolioni Nalaga =

Fiji international rugby union player

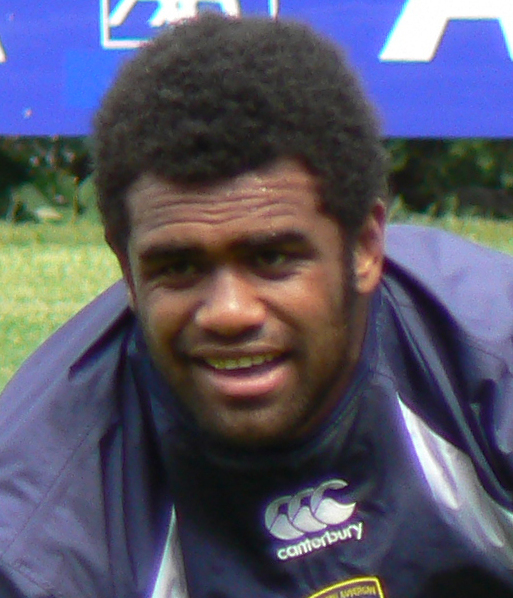
- Born: Napolioni Vonowale Nalaga; 7 April 1986 (age 40) Sigatoka, Fiji
- Height: 1.91 m (6 ft 3 in)
- Weight: 109 kg (17 st 2 lb; 240 lb)
- School: Lelean Memorial School
- Notable relative(s): Kavekini Nalaga (father); Maleli Kunavore (cousin); Meli Kurisaru (brother); Waqa Nalaga (brother)

Rugby union career
- Position(s): Wing, Flanker, Centre
Senior career
Years	Team	Apps	(Points)
2007–2011	Clermont Auvergne	90	(305)
2012	Western Force	11	(10)
2012–2015	Clermont Auvergne	80	(215)
2015–2017	Lyon OU	32	(110)
2017–2018	London Irish	5	(5)
2019	Penza	1	(0)
2020	Olimpia Lions		
International career
Years	Team	Apps	(Points)
2006	Fiji u21	2	(5)
2009–2015	Fiji	18	(55)
2008	Pacific Islanders	1	(0)
- Correct as of 1 January 2020
National sevens team
Years	Team		Comps
2009	Fiji		2008–09

Napolioni Vonowale Nalaga (born 7 April 1986) is a Fijian rugby union footballer. He plays as a wing, flanker and Centre for London Irish. He is nicknamed Napoleon or Naps or Napo. His father Kavekini Nalaga also represented Fiji in the 80's and just like his son, he played on the wing.

== Career ==
Born in Sigatoka, Fiji, Nalaga first played as a wing for the Fiji Under 19 team to the Under 19 Rugby World Championship where he notched 7 tries in 3 games for the Fiji team. He also helped his Nadroga team win the U21 competition in the Digicel Cup for 2 years in a row. He was later selected to play for the Fiji U21 team to the 2006 Under 21 Rugby World Championship in France where Fiji finished 9th overall. He played as a Centre in the tournament. He also made his mark for the Nadroga senior team playing in the Digicel Cup and the Farebrother Sullivan cup. He was selected into the Fiji sevens team by the then coach Waisale Serevi who was impressed with the youngster for the first leg of the 2006–07 IRB Sevens World Series.

On 11 July 2014, he married his Longtime sweetheart Neomai Baleisuva at his hometown and village Nasama in Sigatoka, the mother of his three kids.

== Clermont Rugby ==
After his first season with the Fiji sevens team, he was given a contract to play for the ASM Clermont Auvergne in the 2007/2008 season alongside other Fijians, Vilimoni Delasau and Seremaia Bai where he finished the season as the leading try-scorer in the competition with 16 tries, 3 better than the previous year, top-try scorer, and captain, Aurélien Rougerie.

In 2008, he was selected in the Pacific Islanders 2008 tour to Britain and Ireland. He was selected to play against France on 15 November 2008 where he made a late, high tackle that resulted in a serious injury to French scrum-half, Jean-Baptiste Élissalde and was subsequently given a red card and expelled from the game. He was banned by the IRB judiciary for 22 days. He made a comeback for Clermont on 13 December in the Heineken Cup against Munster after his ban expired. and is the top try-scorer in the Top 14 with 13 tries. He has also been selected to be part of the Fiji sevens team to the 2009 Rugby World Cup Sevens in Dubai. He ended the 2008–09 Top 14 season as the top try scorer scoring 21 tries in 19 appearances breaking the record he set last year by 2 tries. In October 2009, he was named the French Top 14 player of the year for the 2008/2009 season and was also included in the French Dream team, the last Fijian to win that award was Rupeni Caucau in 2006

He played in the final as Clermont won the Top 14 title in 2009–10, and scored a try in the process.

== Fiji team ==
He was selected in the 30-member Fiji squad for the 2009 Autumn Internationals and he made his debut against Scotland on 14 November.

In early 2011, he did not return to his club for the second half of the Top 14 due to some family issues surrounding his wedding. He was given time to return to the club but in March 2011, his contract with Clermont was terminated as Nalaga was unable to guarantee if he would return to France or not.

After being unheard for in months, he was spotted at a local rugby tournament in Fiji in May 2011 for Nadroga in the Digicel Cup. His prowess and form saw him getting a call-up to the Fiji national team to prepare for the 2011 IRB Pacific Nations Cup. After passing the trials, he was included in the expanded Fiji team to prepare for the PNC and the 2011 Rugby World Cup. He ended up with just one try at the Rugby World Cup, just like his father in the 1987 RWC.

== Western Force ==
In September 2011, he signed a one-year contract with Australian Super rugby side, Western Force for the 2012 Super Rugby season. He finished the Super rugby season with 2 tries in 11 appearances.

== Move back to Clermont ==
In April 2012, he signed a 3-year contract to return to his former club Clermont after the end of the super rugby season.

On 13 April 2013, Nalaga had played 25 games for Clermont in both the 2012–13 Top 14 season and the 2012–13 Heineken Cup leading the try-scoring tally in both with 13 and 6 tries respectively. Since his return, he has scored 19 tries in 25 games taking his overall tally to 80 tries in 115 games for Clermont.

On 27 April, Nalaga's solo try in the Heineken Cup semi-final against Munster helped his team reach the Grand Final of the Heineken Cup where he scored a try but it wasn't enough to defeat the new champion, Toulon. He ended the tournament with 8 tries scoring 5 tries in pool play and a try each in the quarter-final, semi final and the grand final.

In December 2013, he scored a try in 18 seconds in the 2013–14 Heineken Cup making it the fastest try ever in the 1844 match, 18-year history of the Heineken Cup. He finished the season with 5 tries and is the 10th most highest try scorer in Heineken Cup history with 23 tries.

In October 2014, he scored twice in the European Rugby Champions against Sale Sharks to take his record to 25 tries in 32 ERC games joining the 'Elite 25 Try' club.

== Toulon deal and joining Lyon ==
In December 2014, he signed a three-year contract with another French Top 14 side, Toulon worth FJD$70,000 a month but in May 2015, Toulon turned back on their deal citing Joshua Tuisova's form and a four-year contract extension made them re-think their decision allowing Pierre Mignoni (current Toulon backs coach but signed as the Head coach for Lyon for next season) to sign Nalaga to join the now-relegated Lyon OU next season.

He scored 14 tries in 12 games for Lyon in his first season before a thumb injury ruled him out for 2 months.

== London Irish ==
On 2 June 2017, he signed a contract with newly promoted Premiership Rugby side, London Irish after his 2-year contract with Lyon expired.

== Honours ==
- Top try scorer 2007–08 Top 14 season (16 tries)
- Top try scorer 2008–09 Top 14 season (21 tries)
- French Top 14 Player of the year (2008–09)
- French Dream Team (2008–09)
- Top 14 titles winner (2009–10)
- Fastest Try in the 2013–14 Heineken Cup (18 seconds)
- 6th Highest try scorer in Heineken Cup/ERC history

== See also ==
- 2006 Under 21 Rugby World Championship
- 2006–07 IRB Sevens World Series
- 2007–08 Top 14 season
