= Pierre-Emmanuel Garcia =

Spain international rugby union player

- Born: Pierre-Emmanuel Garcia; 5 May 1983 (age 43) Narbonne, France
- Height: 6 ft (1.8 m)
- Weight: 198 lb (90 kg)

Rugby union career
- Position: Centre
Senior career
Years	Team	Apps	(Points)
- Clermont Auvergne
–	Castres		
International career
Years	Team	Apps	(Points)
2012–	Spain	4	(0)

Pierre-Emmanuel Garcia (born 5 May 1983, Narbonne, France) is a French-born Spanish rugby union player. He plays as a centre.

Garcia currently plays for Castres Olympique, in the French Top 14.

He has won 4 caps for Spain, since 2012.
