= Thibaut Privat =

French rugby union player (born 1979)

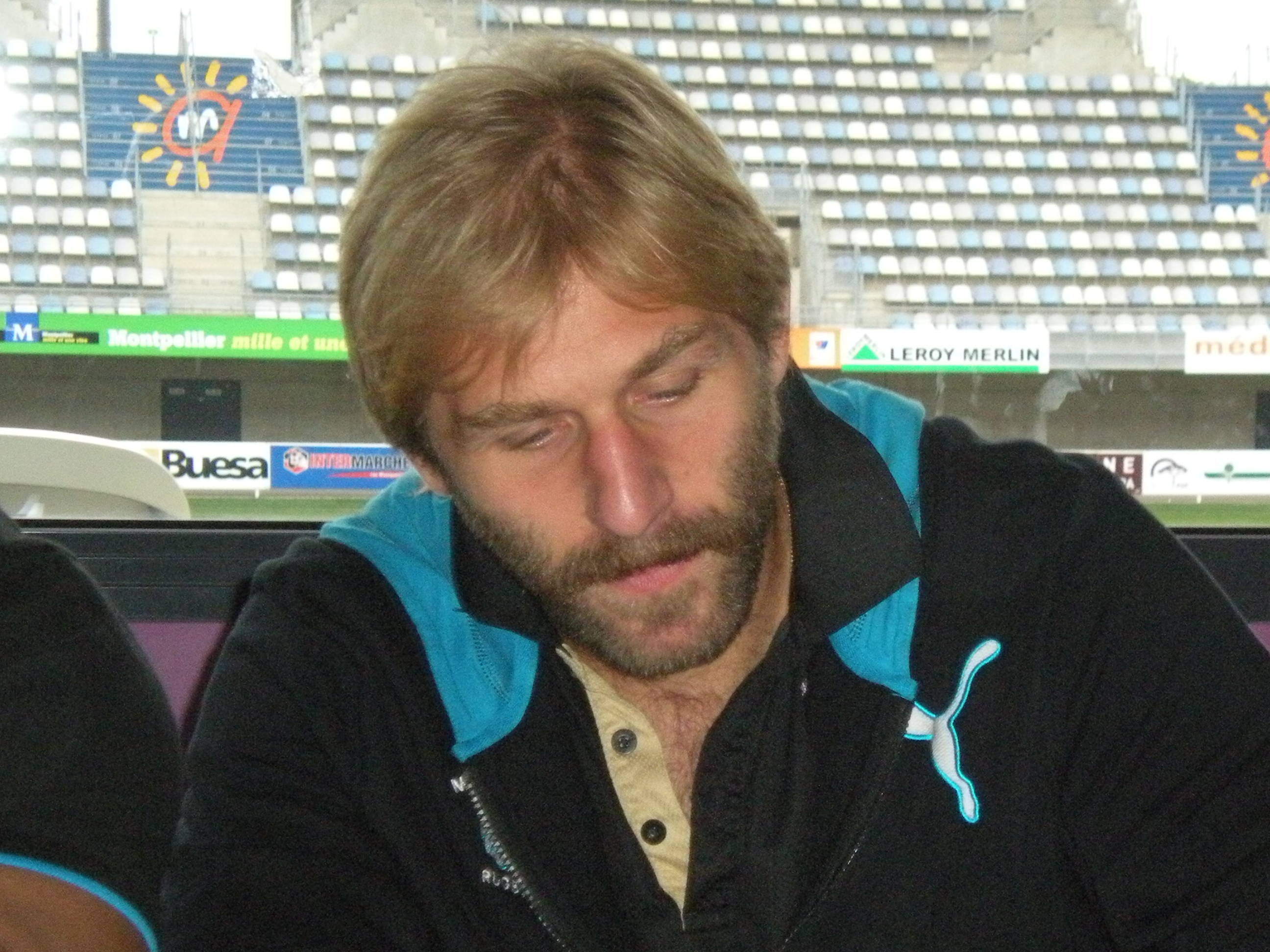
- Born: 6 February 1979 (age 47) Nîmes, France
- Height: 2.00 m (6 ft 7 in)
- Weight: 115 kg (18 st 2 lb; 254 lb)

Rugby union career
- Position: Lock
Senior career
Years	Team	Apps	(Points)
1998–2000	RC Nîmes	30	(0)
2000–2003	Béziers	67	(25)
2003–2011	Clermont Auvergne	239	(25)
2011–2016	Montpellier	123	(5)
2016–2017	Lyon	18	(0)
International career
Years	Team	Apps	(Points)
2001–2005	France	10	(0)

Thibaut Privat (born 4 February 1979) is a former French international rugby union player. He played as a Lock for AS Béziers, Montferrand and Montpellier.

He was called up as an injury replacement for Olivier Brouzet at the 2003 Rugby World Cup.

He played in the final as Clermont won the Top 14 title in 2009–10.

== Honours ==
- Selected to represent France, 2001–2005
- Grand Slam 2002
- French rugby champion, 2010 with Montferrand
- European Challenge Cup 2007 with Montferrand
- French Championship finalist 2007, 2008, 2009 and 2010 with Montferrand
