= Jérôme Porical =

French rugby union player (born 1985)

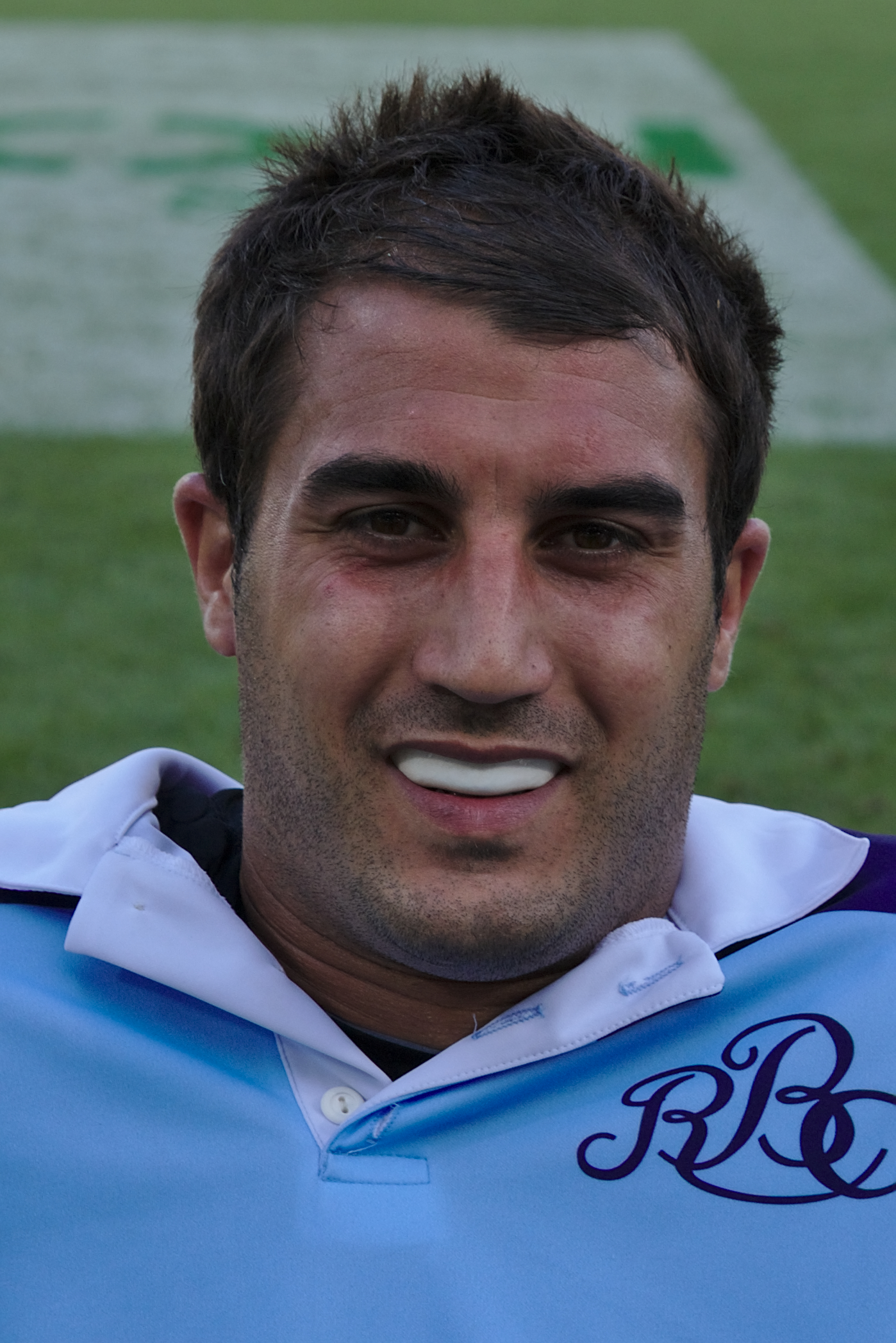
- Born: 20 September 1985 (age 41) Perpignan, France
- Height: 1.83 m (6 ft 0 in)
- Weight: 80 kg (12 st 8 lb; 176 lb)

Rugby union career
- Position: Fullback
- Current team: Béziers
Senior career
Years	Team	Apps	(Points)
2006–2012	Perpignan	114	(838)
2012–2014	Stade Français	39	(405)
2014-2017	Lyon	43	(156)
2017-	Béziers	48	(300)
- Correct as of 26 December 2019 @ 07:31:16AM
International career
Years	Team	Apps	(Points)
2010–	France	4	(3)
- Correct as of 5 December 2011

Jérôme Porical (born 20 September 1985 in Perpignan) is a professional rugby union fullback currently playing for Béziers in the French Pro D2. He has previously played for Stade Français, Lyon in the Top 14, but started his career with home-town club Perpignan, where both his grandfather Paul and his father Gérald played, Paul reaching three French Championship finals and winning one in 1938, and Gérald losing the 1977 final. In the 2008–09 Top 14 season, Jérôme reached the final of the Top 14, again with Perpignan, and greatly contributed to his side's 22–13 victory over Clermont, managing a perfect 5 out of 5 in his kicking attempts.

== Honours ==
- USA Perpignan
  - Top 14 (2009)
