= Sam Gerber =

South African rugby union player

- Born: 5 February 1981 (age 45) Uitenhage, South Africa
- Height: 1.87 m (6 ft 1 1/2 in)
- Weight: 96 kg (15 st 2 lb)

Rugby union career
- Position: Winger
Senior career
Years	Team	Apps	(Points)
2003–2006	Pumas	16	(30)
2006–present	Bayonne	105	(150)
- Correct as of 9 May 2011

Sam Gerber (born 5 February 1981 in Uitenhage) is a South African rugby union winger, currently playing for the Top 14 club Aviron Bayonnais, having previously only played for the Pumas, with whom he participated in the Currie Cup in 2005 and 2006. He was the top try scorer during the 2009–10 Top 14 season.
