= Benoît Cabello =

French rugby union player

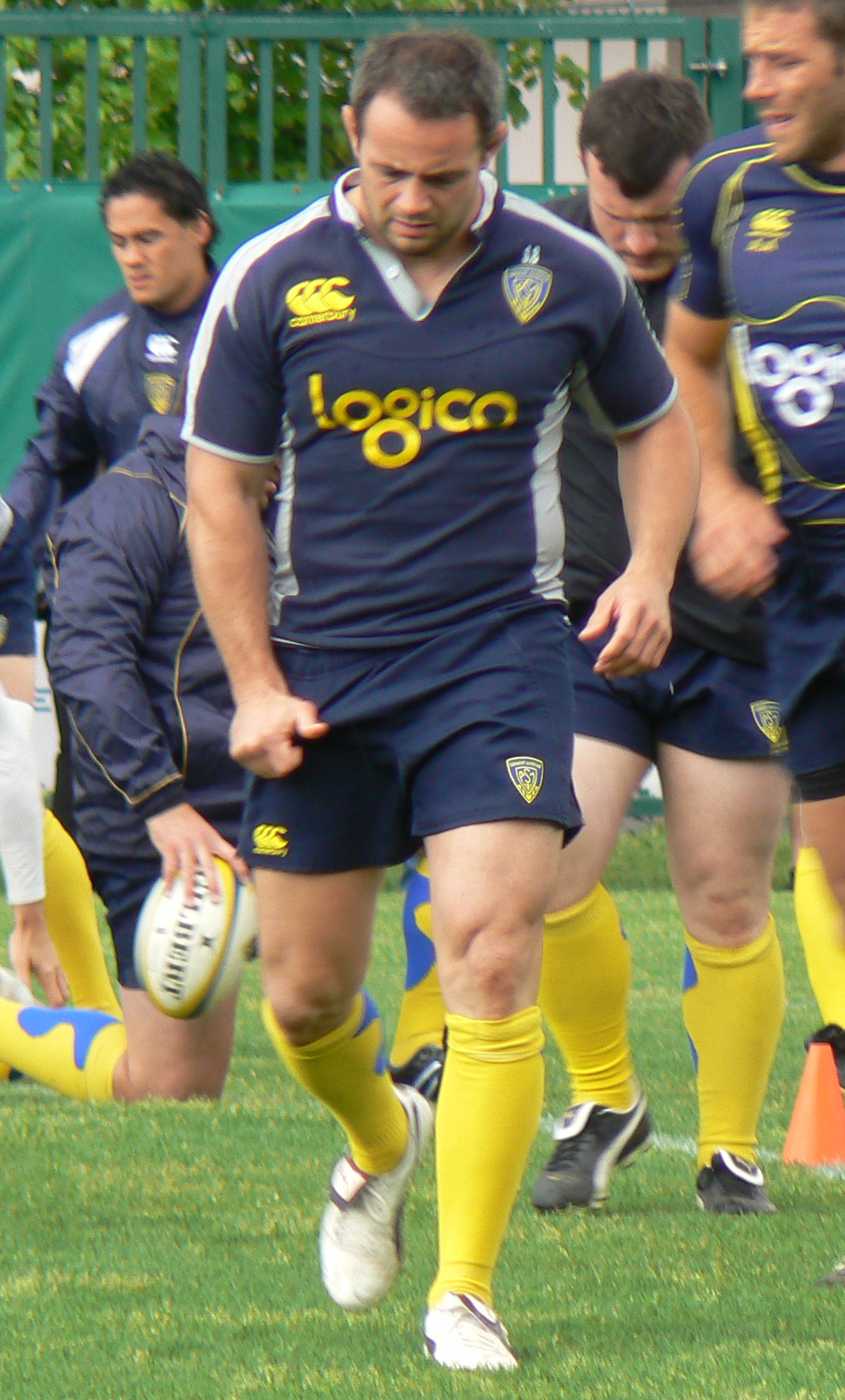
- Born: 17 February 1980 (age 46) Perpignan, France
- Height: 1.75 m (5 ft 9 in)
- Weight: 95 kg (14 st 13 lb)

Rugby union career
- Position: Hooker
Senior career
Years	Team	Apps	(Points)
2001–2002	Racing Métro		
2002–2003	Stade Français		
2003–2008	Bourgoin-Jallieu	101	(70)
2008–2010	Clermont Auvergne	30	(10)
2010–2011	CA Brive	13	(10)
2011–	Clermont Auvergne	17	(5)
- Correct as of 8 November 2012
- Correct as of 8 November 2012

Benoît Cabello (born 27 February 1980) is a French rugby union player. His position is Hooker and he currently plays for Clermont Auvergne in the Top 14.

He began his career with the Paris clubs, moving from Racing Métro to Stade Français, before settling at Bourgoin in 2003, where he would stay for five years, becoming a key part of the side as the starting Hooker and a semi-regular try scorer. He moved to Clermont Auvergne in 2008. He was a replacement in the final as Clermont won the Top 14 title in 2009–10.

== Honours ==
- Top 14 Champion – 2009–10
