= Maxime Mermoz =

France international rugby union player

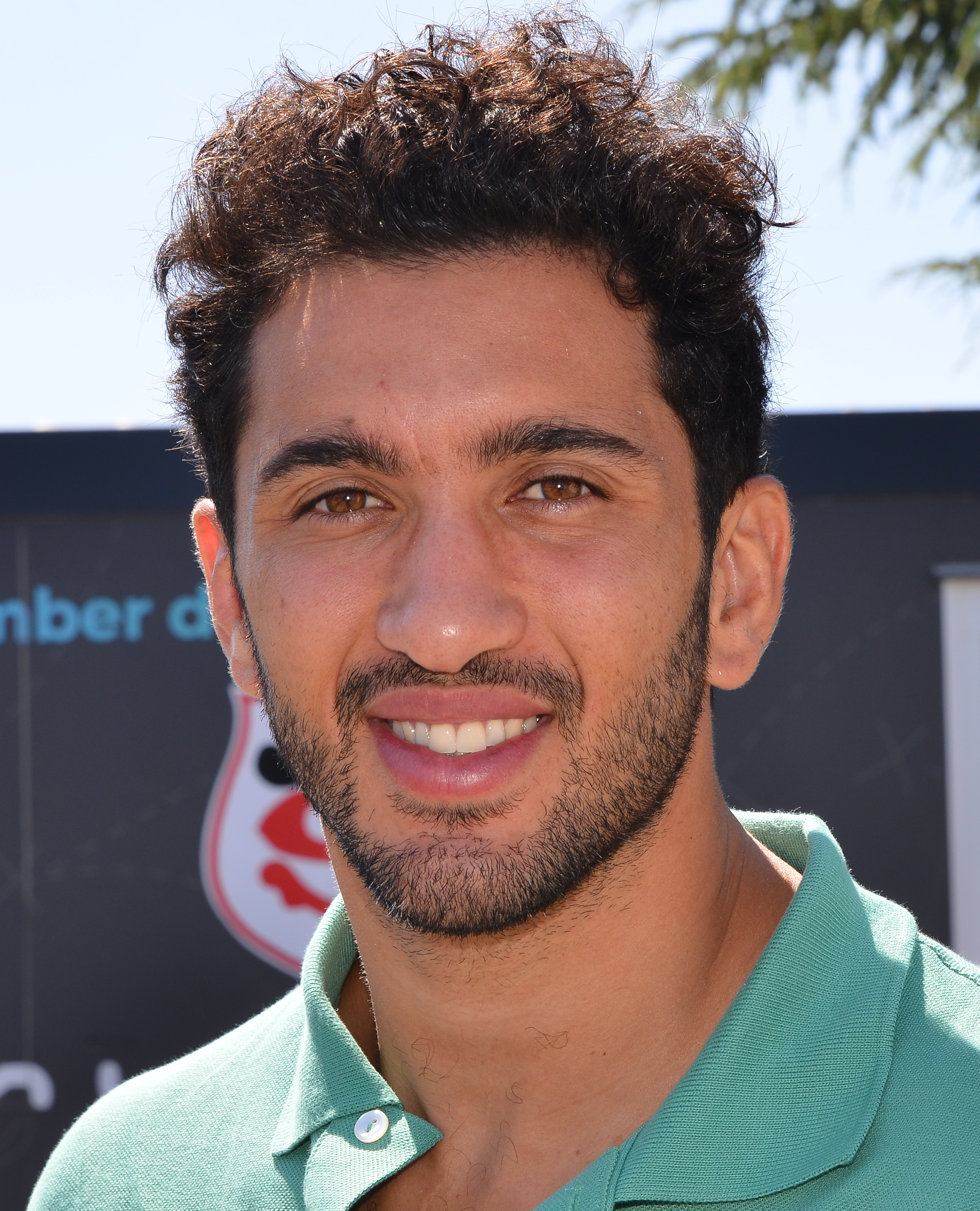
- Mermoz in 2018
- Born: Maxime Mermoz; 28 July 1986 (age 39) Épinal, France
- Height: 1.8 m (5 ft 11 in)
- Weight: 90 kg (14 st 2 lb; 198 lb)

Rugby union career
- Position: Centre
Senior career
Years	Team	Apps	(Points)
2005–2008	Toulouse	19	(5)
2008–2012	Perpignan	75	(70)
2012–2017	Toulon	102	(100)
2017	Leicester Tigers	8	(10)
2017–2018	Newcastle Falcons	9	(0)
2018–2020	Toulouse	14	(10)
- Correct as of 25 August 2020
International career
Years	Team	Apps	(Points)
2008–2016	France	35	(15)
- Correct as of 19 March 2016

Maxime Mermoz (born 28 July 1986) is a French former professional rugby union player.

Mermoz won the 2006 Under 21 Rugby World Championship. He earned his first cap for the senior France national team on 5 July 2008 against Australia. He made his Six Nations Championship debut in the 2009 Six Nations Championship against Scotland. Mermoz scored his first try for France in their 37-17 loss to New Zealand at the 2011 Rugby World Cup, he intercepted a Dan Carter pass close to the half-way line before running clear to score. In May 2013 he was an unused replacement as Toulon won the 2013 Heineken Cup Final by 16–15 against Clermont Auvergne.

In January 2017, he signed a short-term deal for English side, Leicester Tigers as an injury cover for Matt To'omua and Manu Tuilagi who were sidelined for the rest of the season. He made his debut against Gloucester off the bench coming in for Matt Smith in the 51st minute and he scored his first try 30 minutes later.

In February 2017, he signed for another English club, Newcastle Falcons and would join them at the end of the current season.

== International tries ==
#	Date	Venue	Opponent	Result (France-...)	Competition
1.	24 September 2011	Eden Park, Auckland, New Zealand	New Zealand	17-37	2011 Rugby World Cup
2.	23 June 2012	Estadio Monumental José Fierro, San Miguel de Tucuman, Argentina	Argentina	49–10	Test Match

== Honours ==
Toulouse

- Top 14 (1): 2007–08

Perpignan

- Top 14 (1): 2008–09

Toulon

- Heineken Cup (3): 2012–13, 2013–14, 2014–15
- Top 14 (1): 2013–14

France U21

- Under 21 Rugby World Championship (1): 2006
