= Davit Zirakashvili =

Georgia international rugby union player

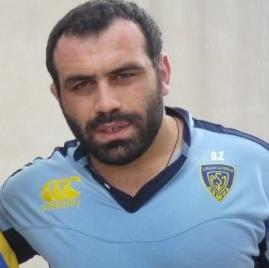
- Davit Zirakashvili for ASM Clermont Auvergne
- Born: 10 October 1983 (age 43) Rustavi, Georgia
- Height: 1.79 m (5 ft 10 1/2 in)
- Weight: 120 kg (18 st 13 lb)

Rugby union career
- Position: Prop
Senior career
Years	Team	Apps	(Points)
2002–2004	Aubenas		
2004–2020	Clermont Auvergne	337	(90)
International career
Years	Team	Apps	(Points)
2004–2015	Georgia	53	(40)

Davit Zirakashvili (Georgian: დავით ზირაქაშვილი, born 10 October 1983) is a former Georgian rugby union player. He played most of his career for Clermont in the top French professional rugby league, the Top 14. He played as a tighthead prop. He is seen as one of Georgia's finest ever rugby players and was voted Georgian sportsman of the year in 2010.

== Career ==
Zirakashvili originally came from a wrestling background, but switched to rugby in 2000. He moved to France in 2002 to play with Fédérale 1 side Aubenas. He moved up the leagues to the Top 14 in the 2004/05 season to play with Clermont where he joined his Georgian compatriot Goderdzi Shvelidze. He also made his debut for Georgia in 2004 against Uruguay.

He soon became an important member of both the Clermont and Georgia side. He played in all four of the consecutive Top 14 finals Clermont reached between 2007 and 2010, he scored a try in the 2008 Top 14 final against Toulouse and in 2010 became the first Georgian player to win the Top 14, and represented Georgia in both the 2007 and 2011 World Cups.

In 2010, Zirakashvili was voted Georgian sportsman of the year after some crucial performances for both club and country. He was part of a Georgian scrum which scored three penalty tries and also a pushover try in the calendar year, he also a memorable solo try from 45 metres out against Russia in Trabzon and an important try against Canada. His scrummaging was a key factor in Georgia recording wins against both Canada and USA for the first time, whilst at club level he was part of Clermont's Top 14 winning side. Zirakashvili was also mentioned as one of the best tighthead props of the year in world rugby by The Daily Telegraph.
