= Alexandre Audebert =

French rugby union player (born 1977)

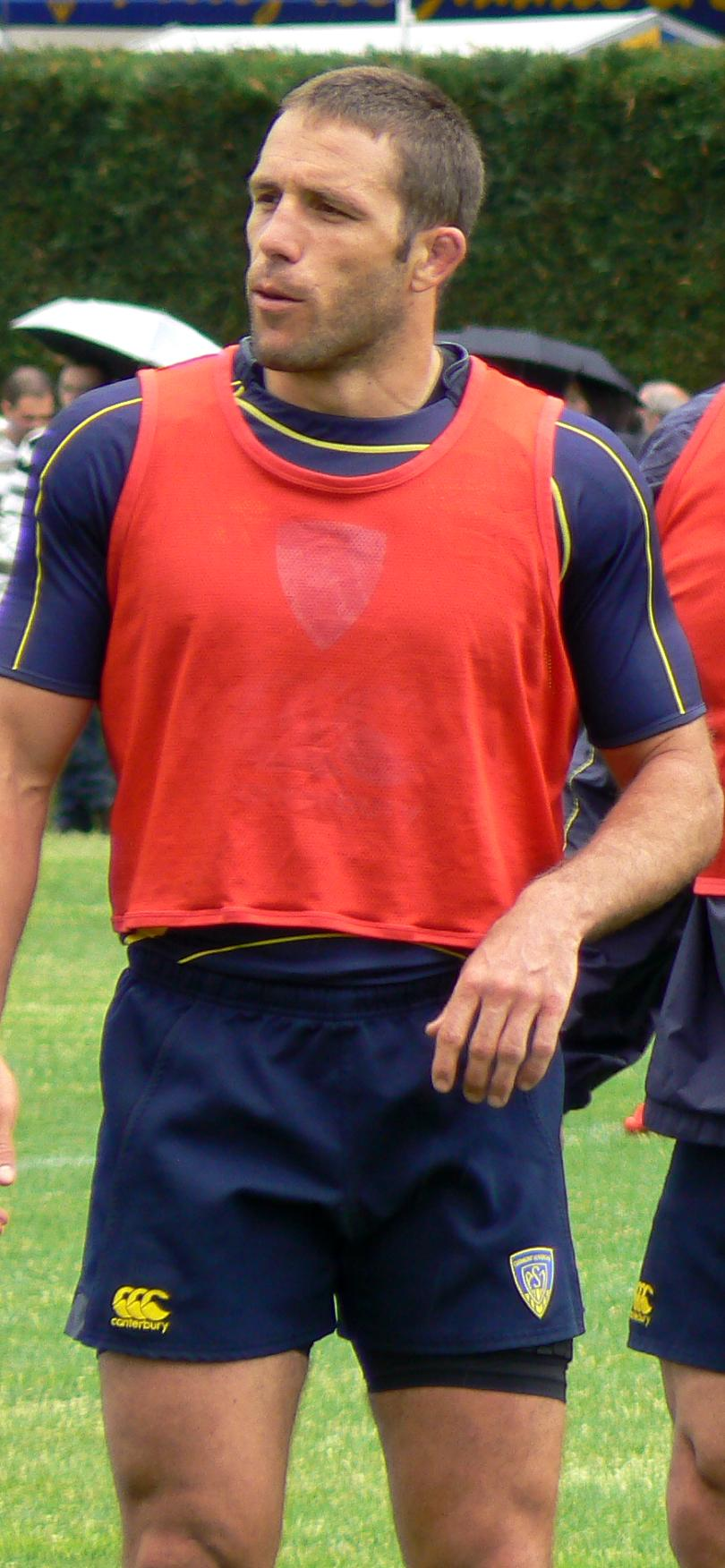
- Born: 4 August 1977 (age 49) Suresnes, France
- Height: 1.87 m (6 ft 1 1/2 in)
- Weight: 99 kg (15 st 8 lb)

Rugby union career
- Position: Flanker
Senior career
Years	Team	Apps	(Points)
1998-1999	Racing Métro 92		
1999-	Clermont	170	(105)
International career
Years	Team	Apps	(Points)
2000-2002	France	2	(0)

Alexandre Audebert (born 4 August 1977) is a rugby union player for Clermont in the Top 14. He made his debut for France on 28 May 2000 against Romania in Bucharest.

He was a replacement in the final as Clermont won the Top 14 title in 2009–10.
