= Anthony Floch =

France international rugby union player

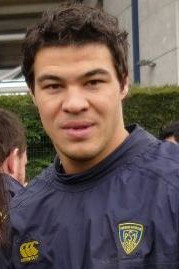
- Born: Anthony Floch; 12 February 1983 (age 43) Clermont-Ferrand, France
- Height: 1.82 m (6 ft 0 in)
- Weight: 82 kg (12 st 13 lb)

Rugby union career
- Position: Fullback
- Current team: Montpellier
Senior career
Years	Team	Apps	(Points)
2001–2013	ASM Clermont Auvergne	204	(503)
2013–2016	Montpellier	31	(11)
International career
Years	Team	Apps	(Points)
2008	France	3	(5)

Anthony Floch (born 12 February 1983 in Clermont-Ferrand, Puy-de-Dôme) is a French rugby union player, who normally plays at fullback. He currently plays for Montpellier in the Top 14.

== Top 14 ==
He made 24 appearances, scoring 49 points, in the 2006/07 season as Clermont reached the Top 14 final and won the European Challenge Cup. He played in the final as Clermont won the Top 14 title in 2009–10, and scored a drop goal in the process. In the 2011 Top 14 he scored, a 60-metre goal, with over 10 metres to spare. This was one of the biggest kicks seen. In 2013, Floch signed a deal to join French Top 14 side Montpellier.

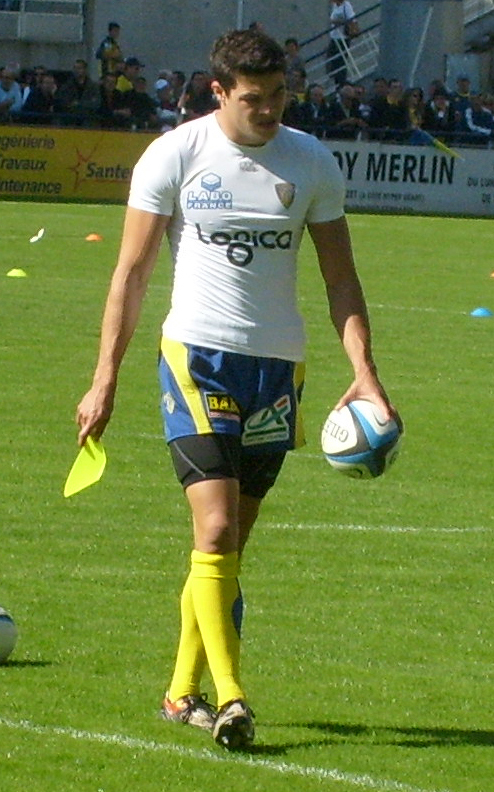
Floch before a match

== International career ==
He was called up to the French squad by Marc Lievremont for the 2008 Six Nations Championship, where he won his first cap off the bench against England in a defeat at the Stade de France. Floch started against Italy two weeks later and scored his first international try in the first half. He held his place for the final game of the tournament against Wales in Cardiff where the hosts were victorious and secured their second Grand Slam in four seasons.
