= Gavin Hume =

South African rugby union player

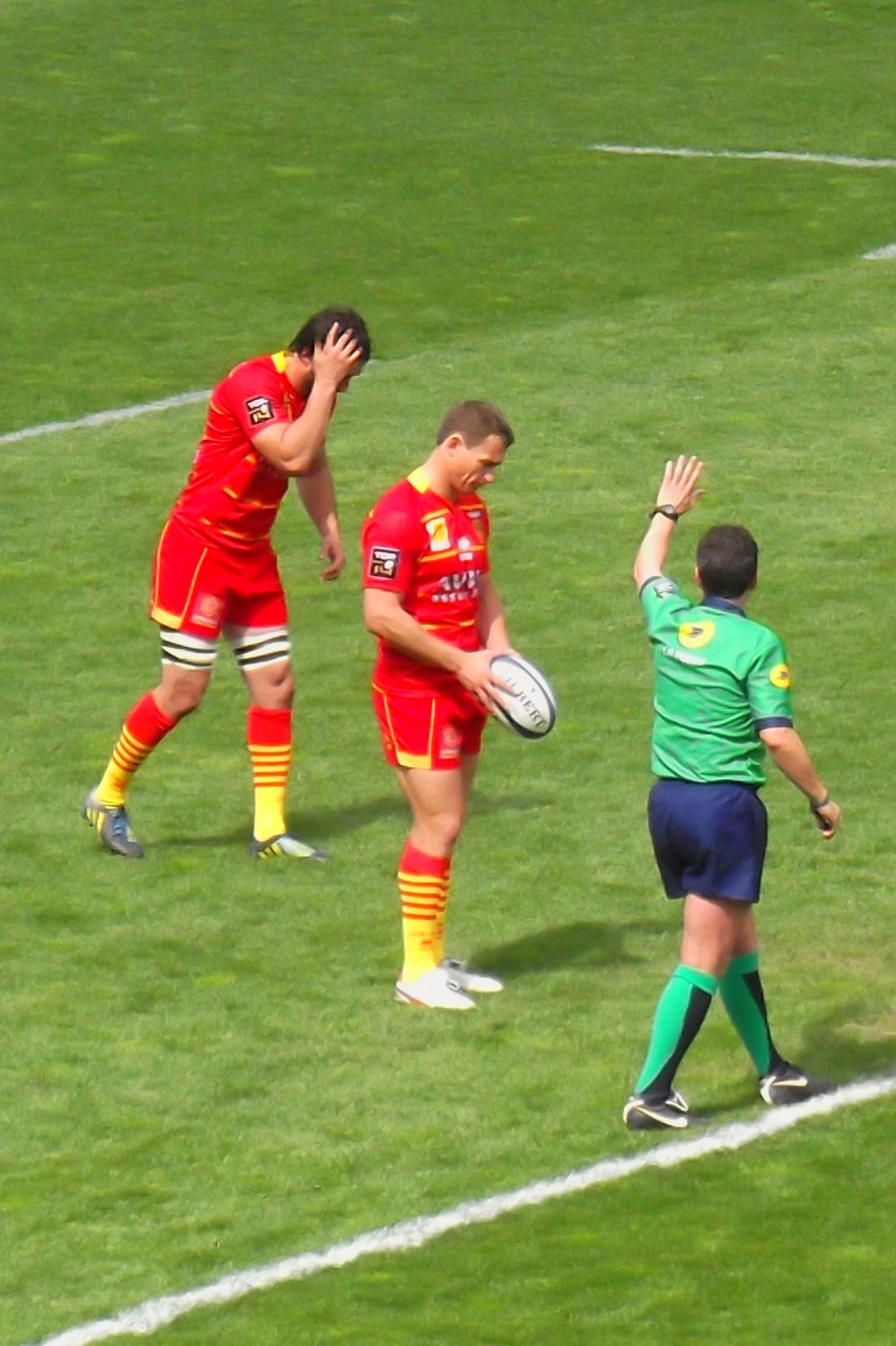
- Born: Gavin Hume; 25 March 1980 (age 46) Riversdale, Western Cape, South Africa
- Height: 1.87 m (6 ft 1 1/2 in)
- Weight: 104 kg (16 st 5 lb)

Rugby union career
- Position: Centre
Senior career
Years	Team	Apps	(Points)
2001–2002	Sharks (Currie Cup)		
2002–2004	SWD Eagles		
2004–	USA Perpignan	126	(98)
Super Rugby
Years	Team	Apps	(Points)
2004	Stormers		

Gavin Hume (born 25 March 1980 in Riversdale, Western Cape, South Africa) is a rugby union centre for Perpignan in the French Top 14. He joined Perpignan in 2004 from the Super 12 team Stormers.
