= Julien Candelon =

French rugby union player (born 1980)

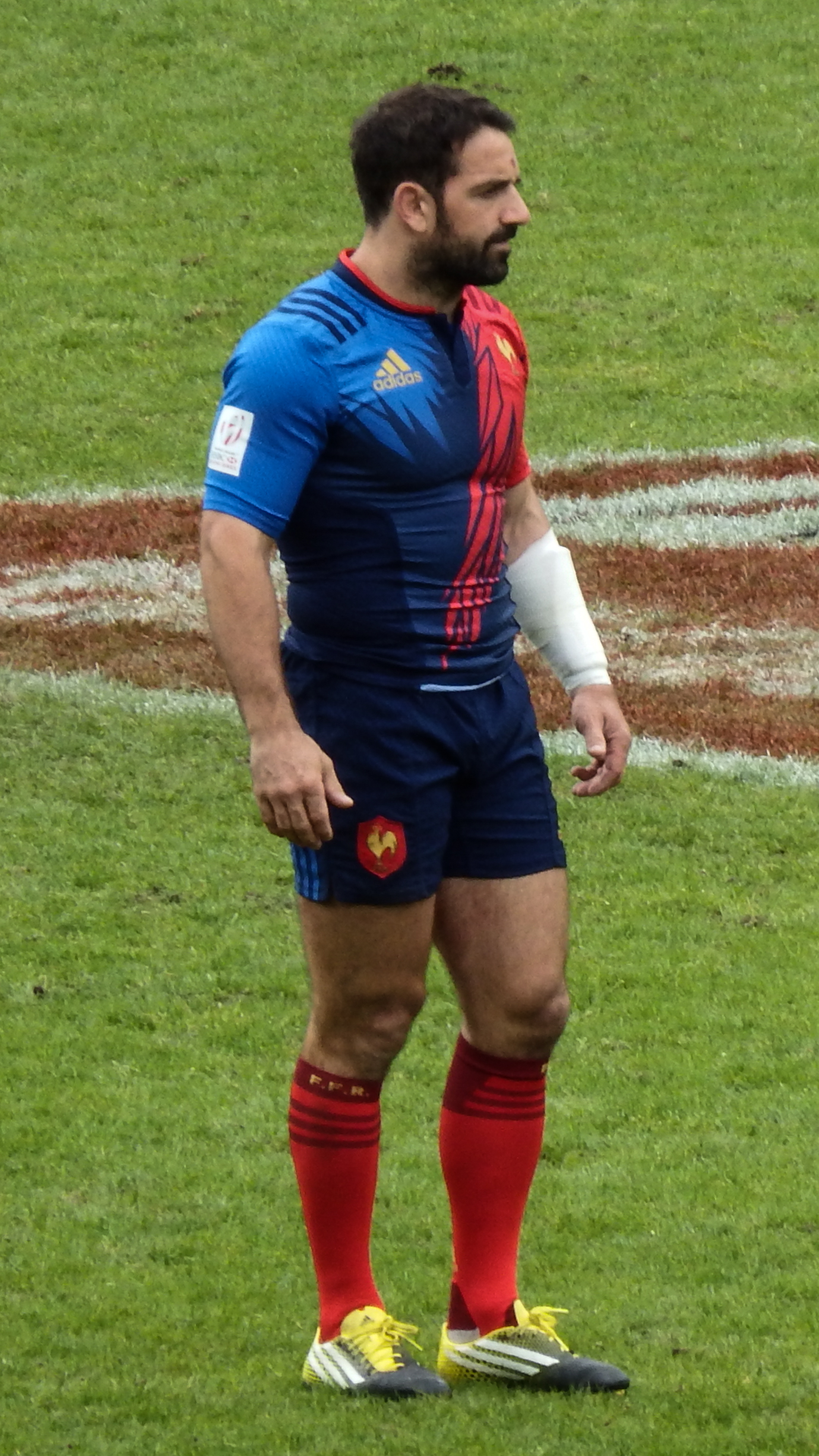
- Born: 8 July 1980 (age 46) Agen, France
- Height: 1.70 m (5 ft 7 in)
- Weight: 82 kg (12 st 13 lb; 181 lb)

Rugby union career
- Position: Winger
Senior career
Years	Team	Apps	(Points)
2003-2007	Narbonne	80	(190)
2007-	Perpignan	37	(55)
- Correct as of May 31, 2009
International career
Years	Team	Apps	(Points)
2005	France	2	(10)
–	France Sevens		
- Correct as of May 30, 2009

Julien Candelon (born July 8, 1980 in Agen) is a professional rugby union winger currently playing for USA Perpignan in the Top 14.

Candelon has earned two caps for the France national team, the first one coming on 18 June 2005 against South Africa. He has scored two tries for his country. He also played for the France Sevens national team.
