= Grégory Le Corvec =

French rugby union footballer (born 1977)

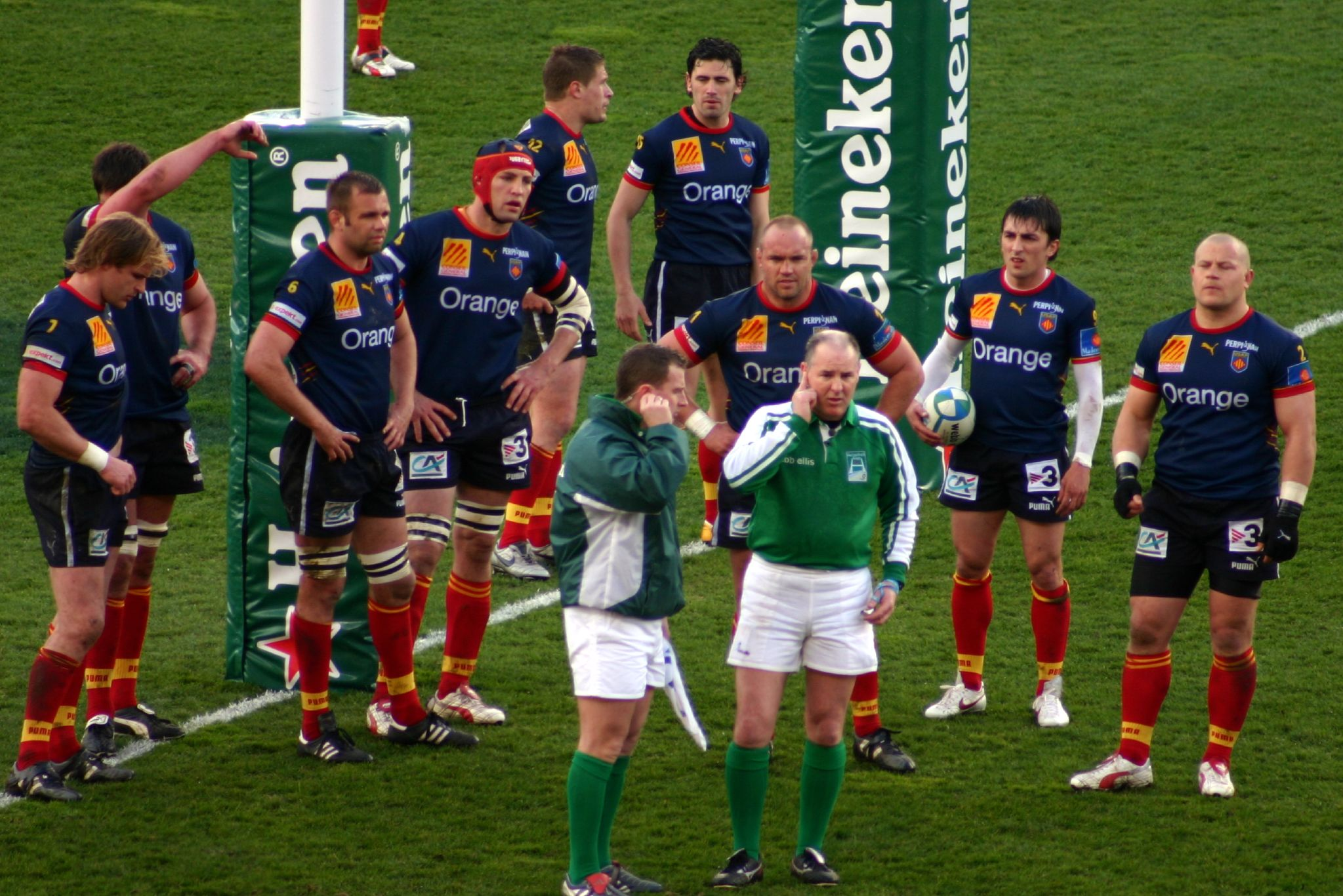
USAP (USA Perpignan) rugby team. Heineken Cup. From Flickr

Grégory Le Corvec (born 4 March 1977) is a French rugby union footballer. He currently plays for USA Perpignan in the Top 14, with his usual position is at flanker.

Prior to joining USAP in 2000, he played with RC Toulon and Stade Montois. He has also played for France 'A' and was included in France's mid-year Test squad for 2007. He made his debut against New Zealand on 2 June 2007, which is his only cap for the national side.
