= Arthur Thomas =

Arthur Thomas may refer to:

== Sports ==
- Arthur Thomas (Cambridge University cricketer) (1816–1895), English cricketer
- Arthur Thomas (baseball) (1864–1895), African-American baseball catcher and first baseman
- Arthur Thomas (Australian cricketer) (1869–1934), Australian cricketer
- Arthur Thomas (Glamorgan cricketer) (1895–1953), Welsh cricketer
- Arthur Thomas (New Zealand cricketer) (1881–1965), New Zealand cricketer
- Arthur Thomas (rugby league) (1901–1970), of the 1920s and '30s for Great Britain, England, Leeds, and York
- Arthur Thomas (footballer) (1938–2007), for Linfield F.C. from Ballymena United F.C. in November 1965
- Arthur Thomas (rugby union)

== Other ==
- Arthur Thomas (composer) (1850–1892), English composer
- Arthur Lloyd Thomas (1851–1924), Governor of Utah
- Arthur W. Thomas (1891–1982), chemist and professor who specialized in colloid chemistry
- Arthur Devere Thomas (1895–1973), George Cross recipient
- Arthur S. Thomas (1935–2001), Chief of Chaplains of the U.S. Air Force
- Arthur Allan Thomas (born 1938), New Zealander pardoned for the murders of Harvey and Jeanette Crewe
- Arthur Thomas (Emmerdale), fictional character on the British soap opera Emmerdale
- A. Nutter Thomas (1869–1954), Anglican Bishop of Adelaide

== See also ==
- Thomas Arthur (disambiguation)
