= Petone Rugby Club =

NZ rugby union club, based in Petone

(New Zealand) Petone RFC
- Full name: Petone Rugby Football Club
- Union: WRFU
- Founded: 1885; 141 years ago
- Grounds: North Park 41°13′15.3″S 174°53′5.7″E; Petone Recreation Ground
- League: Wellington Premiership

Official website
- www.petonerugby.com

The Petone Rugby Football Club is a rugby union club founded in 1885 in Petone, Lower Hutt.The club is one of the most successful and historic clubs in New Zealand, having been the Wellington Premier Champion 40 times between 1895 and 2026, including 16 Swindale Shields and 27 Jubilee Cups.

Petone is a constituent club of the Wellington Rugby Football Union. The premier men's team competes in the Swindale Shield. The premier 2 men's team competes in the Harper Lock Shield. The Women's 'Ponies' team competes in the Rebecca Liua’ana Trophy. The Under-21 (Colts) team competes in the Tank Paris Memorial Trophy.

== History ==
=== Foundation and early successes (1885-1908) ===
Petone Rugby Football Club was founded in 1885 in Petone, Lower Hutt, New Zealand, and is based at North Park on Udy Street. The founding members included Patron and President H.S. Fitzherbert, Secretary W. S. Riddler, and Treasurer G. Carey. The founding of the Club predated Petone itself becoming a borough by three years. The Wellington "Axemen" and Poneke Football Club are the only older Wellington clubs than Petone, being founded in 1870 and 1883 respectively.

The centennial history records that Te Puni arrived in the Hutt Valley in 1817 and died there in 1870. In the first official match ever played by the Petone Club, three descendants of Te Puni were in the fifteen.

It would be ten years before the club's first premier championship came in 1895, beating out Poneke to secure a victory in the senior championship. The 1899 season would see Petone win the championship for a second time, before sustaining a four-year reign as Premier Champions between 1904 and 1907. The Club set a memorable record in the 1907 season when it won all championship grades in the Wellington competition.^{[4]} After the 1907 season the club was weakened by inadvertently helping the formation of rugby league in New Zealand. The club provided six players for the professional 1907–1908 rugby tour of Great Britain including its two All Blacks at the time, Tom Cross and Duncan McGregor, and the club's captain, Hercules Wright. The New Zealand Rugby Union subsequently banned all members of the tour for life.

=== Wartime and interwar years (1914-1938) ===
==== First World War ====
The First and Second World War greatly affected rugby communities across New Zealand; Petone was no exception. Many club members served in the wars, including All Black Brothers Jimmy and Eddie Ryan who served in the Otago Infantry Regiment during the First World War. Both men would survive the war and return to rugby. Perhaps the most notable WWI serviceman from Petone was William Hardham VC. Hardham—a veteran of the Second Boer War and Victoria Cross recipient—played for both Petone and Wellington. Hardham would reenlist at the outbreak of war spending time with the New Zealand Expeditionary Force in both Gallipoli and Palestine. Petone would win the premier championship twice during these war years, in 1916 and 1917.

In 1919, Petone was involved in a benefit match against Hutt Rugby Club, with funds being raised for the Petone war memoral.

==== Monogram ====
The club adopted its familiar monogram on the recommendation of its illustrious Life Member and Maori All Black Matt Love as part of its 50th jubilee celebrations in 1935. The monogram is embellished by the words in Maori "kia kaha kia maia" – broadly translated as "give of your best – be confident in your own ability". This reflects the strength of the partnership with Maori in the Club. The monogram was updated in 2010 to include "Est 1885" and the words "Petone Rugby Club".

The interwar period brought about more silverware, with further premier championship victories in 1920, 1922, 1923 & 1924. Three Jubilee Cup wins in 1930, 1935 & 1938 would be achieved before the breakout of the Second World War.

=== The 'Golden Era' and regional dominance (1967–1976) ===
The Petone team from the mid-60s to the late-70s is statistically the most successful club side in Wellington rugby history. Under coaching by Ian Upston, Captain Ken Gray—widely considered one of the greatest All Black prop forwards ever—would lead Petone to four Jubilee Cups in a row (1967-1970), before Captain Andy Leslie would win a further four in 1971, 1973, 1974 & 1976. Petone's remarkable Jubilee Cup era began in 1967, when a 13-13 draw with Wellington was enough to secure the title. They successfully defended the trophy by defeating University 11-9 in the 1968 decider and 19-9 in 1969, before comfortably overcoming Naenae Old Boys 26-6 in 1970. A victory over Wellington in 1971 sealed a record fifth consecutive Jubilee Cup triumph. Although Athletic and Wellington shared the title in 1972, Petone responded emphatically in 1973 by completing an unbeaten season and claiming both the Swindale Shield and Jubilee Cup.

==== 1974 South Africa tour controversy ====
Despite overwhelming on-field success during this era, Petone drew widespread condemnation after a planned rugby tour to Apartheid South Africa publicly emerged in 1973. Despite the Kirk-led government's declared opposition to all sporting contact with South Africa, on 12 November 1973 Petone publicly announced plans to tour the following year. Club president G.L. Earney stated the tour was arranged "behind the scenes" by Bob Scott, with the former All Black's South African contacts willing to subsidise some of the travel costs. Only one player—Maori All Black Vernon Winitana—refused to tour, citing his opposition to South Africa's apartheid policy as justification.

Halt All Racist Tours (HART) chairman Trevor Richards claimed he was both "saddened and angered" Petone decided to tour South Africa, calling it "akin to giving a dying man pills which would keep him alive for six months." Prime Minister Norman Kirk was also outspoken against the decision to tour, stating, "We can't prevent the tour, but I wish people wouldn't do these things."

1974 Petone Tour of South Africa
Opposition	Score	Result
Johannesburg Diggers	15 - 26	Petone Loss
Durban Collegians	12 - 10	Petone Win
Port Elizabeth Crusader XV	18 - 4	Petone Win
Tygerberg Regional XV	32 - 12	Petone Win
Stellenbosch	15 - 17	Petone Loss
Orange Free State Shimlas	24 - 12	Petone Win
Pretoria Police	12 - 17	Petone Loss

=== Modern day (1995–present) ===
The Ken Gray Academy was established in 1995 in Ken's name to assist in the development of the best young players wishing to find their way through the Club to the highest representative honours.

In November 2006, the club hosted The World Golden Oldies Festival and in 2010 the club celebrated its 125th anniversary.

In 2025, the club celebrated its 140th anniversary. As part of the celebrations, William Hardham's Victoria Cross was displayed alongside the Hardham Cup for the first time.

In 2026, Petone won the Swindale Shield and Jubilee Cup in the men's premier grade, the Harper Lock Shield and Ed Chaney Cup in the men's premier two grade, and the Rebecca Liua’ana Trophy and Tia Paasi Memorial Trophy. This is the first time in Wellington club rugby history that three teams from the same club have finished both top of the table and won the premiership in the same season.

== Honours ==
=== Premier Championship (Pre-Jubilee Cup) ===
- Champions (12): 1895, 1899, 1904, 1905, 1906, 1907, 1916, 1917, 1920, 1922, 1923, 1924

=== Jubilee Cup ===
- Champions (27): 1930, 1935, 1938, 1942, 1949=, 1956, 1957, 1959, 1961, 1967, 1968, 1969, 1970, 1971, 1973, 1974, 1976, 1980, 1986, 1989, 1990, 1992, 1993, 2000, 2005, 2026

=== Swindale Shield ===
- Champions (16): 1969, 1970, 1971, 1972=, 1973, 1974, 1975, 1976, 1981, 1983=, 1986, 1992, 2004, 2009=, 2022, 2026

=== Hardham Cup ===
- Champions (4): 1993, 1996, 2018, 2023

== Notable players ==
Petone Rugby Club has produced 31 All Blacks, 3 Black Ferns, 18 NZ Maori representatives and many other internationals for other nations. The club has also produced two All Black captains, Tana Umaga and Andy Leslie. Umaga became an All Black in 1997 and played continuously for his country before his retirement in 2006, becoming captain in 2004. Leslie, a former NZ Rugby Union Vice President, was the club's first appointed All Black touring captain to Ireland and Great Britain (1974) and South Africa (1976).

=== All Blacks ===
- Walter Pringle - 1893
- William McKenzie - 1893
- George Maber - 1894
- Tom Cross - 1904
- Duncan McGregor - 1904
- Bill Reedy - 1908
- James Ryan - 1910
- Jock McKenzie - 1913
- Eddie Ryan - 1921
- Harry "Ginger" Nicholls - 1921
- Mark Nicholls - 1921
- Harold "Doc" Nicholls - 1923
- Arthur Thomas - 1925
- Harold Pollock - 1932
- Arthur Lambourn - 1934
- Roy White - 1946
- Tom Katene - 1955
- Don McIntosh - 1956
- Ken Gray - 1963
- John Dougan - 1972
- Ian Stevens - 1972
- Andy Leslie - 1974
- Allan Hewson - 1979
- Mike Clamp - 1984
- Simon Mannix - 1990
- Laurence Hullena - 1990
- Tana Umaga - 1997
- Jason O'Halloran - 2000
- Neemia Tialata - 2005
- Ross Filipo - 2007
- Peter Lakai - 2024

=== NZ Maori representative ===
- M.K. Love - 1922
- H.P. Heperi - 1949
- T.H. TePuni - 1951
- T. Katene - 1955
- I.P. Puketapu - 1955
- T.M. Love - 1958
- P.J.A. Myers - 1963
- M.B. Koopu - 1966
- J.C. Seymour - 1970
- F.B.H. Walker - 1970
- G.W. Skipper - 1975
- T.S. Arthur - 1980
- M. Clamp - 1980
- N.E.S. Parata - 1989
- R.J. Flutey - 2002
- R.A. Filipo - 2005
- H. Tui - 2007
- M. Kainga - 2014

=== Black Ferns ===
- Rochelle Martin - 1994
- Flo Tamihana - 1995
- Jackie Patea-Fereti - 2016

=== England ===
- Riki Flutey - 2008
- Brad Shields - 2018

=== British & Irish Lions ===
- Riki Flutey - 2008

=== Scotland ===
- John Leslie - 1998
- Martin Leslie - 1998
- Nick Grigg - 2017

=== Samoa ===
- Belgium Tuatagaloa - 2019
- Losi Filipo - 2021

=== Tonga ===
- Viliami Fine - 2021

=== Italy ===
- Aaron Persico - 2000

=== Spain ===
- Corey Smith - 2012

== Location ==
The Petone Club rooms are at the lower end of the Hutt Valley on a site in Udy Street. The Clubrooms stand immediately adjacent to North Park, a field maintained to the highest standards even though it is only used for training.

Other club facilities include:

- Outdoor training - floodlit fields at North Park and on Petone Recreation ground on the other side of Udy Street.
- A large indoor Tiger Turf Stadium capable of use by a full forward pack and backline in training.
- Two large and well equipped changing and showering rooms.
- A modern and very well equipped weights room.
- A large modern fully heated lounge with full bar and kitchen facilities.
- Extensive collection of memorabilia from around the World.

== Club membership ==
Club membership in 2013 totalled more than 750, made up of life members, vice presidents, honorary members, open and age grade players and 412 young players in the junior section ranging from 4 and 5 year olds in the nursery grade to 12 year olds. The club fields nine teams in the Wellington Union's 2013 competition grades from Premier to Colts U21.

The club funds a coaching coordinator, Darren 'Lardy' Larsen. Lardy is a qualified and competent coach. He also runs the Konnect Blue programme that allows juniors leaving for college to stay in touch with the club until they return.
