= 1975 Japan rugby union tour of Australia =

Rugby Union

Summary
P	W	D	L
Total
9	4	0	5
Test match
2	0	0	2
Opponent
P	W	D	L
Australia
2	0	0	2

Tour chronology
- ← New Zealand 1974 Canada 1976 →

The 1975 Japan rugby union tour of Australia was a series of nine matches played by the Japan national rugby union team in Australia in July and August 1975. The Japan team won four of their matches and lost the other five, including both internationals against the Australia national rugby union team.

== Fixtures ==
Date	Venue	Home	Score	Away
20 July 1975	Perry Lakes Stadium, Perth, Western Australia	Western Australia	10–14	Japan XV
23 July 1975	Norwood Oval, Adelaide, South Australia	South Australia	7–21	Japan XV
26 July 1975	Melbourne, Victoria	Victoria	16–20	Japan XV
29 July 1975	Sydney, New South Wales	Sydney	38–22	Japan XV
2 August 1975	Sydney Cricket Ground, Sydney, New South Wales	Australia	37–7	Japan
6 August 1975	Moree, New South Wales	New South Wales Country	97–20	Japan XV
10 August 1975	Ballymore Stadium, Queensland	Queensland	64–23	Japan XV
13 August 1975	Rockhampton, Queensland	Queensland Country	12–32	Japan XV
17 August 1975	Ballymore Stadium, Queensland	Australia	50–25	Japan

== Matches ==
20 July 1975

Western Australia	10–14	Japan XV

Perry Lakes, Perth

23 July 1975

South Australia	7–21	Japan XV

Norwood Oval, Adelaide

26 July 1975

Victoria	16–20	Japan XV

Melbourne

29 July 1975

Sydney	38–22	Japan XV

Sydney

2 August 1975

Australia	37–7	Japan

Sydney Cricket Ground, Sydney
Attendance: 9,533

6 August 1975

New South Wales Country	97–20	Japan XV

Moree

10 August 1975

Queensland	64–23	Japan XV

Ballymore Stadium, Brisbane

13 August 1975

Queensland Country	12–32	Japan XV

Rockhampton

17 August 1975

Australia	50–25	Japan

Ballymore Stadium, Brisbane
Attendance: 5,000

== Citations ==
- Vivian Jenkins, ed. (1976). Rothmans Rugby Yearbook 1976–77. Queen Anne Press. pp. 40–43. ISBN 0-362-00281-9.
