= Laurent Emmanuelli =

French rugby union player

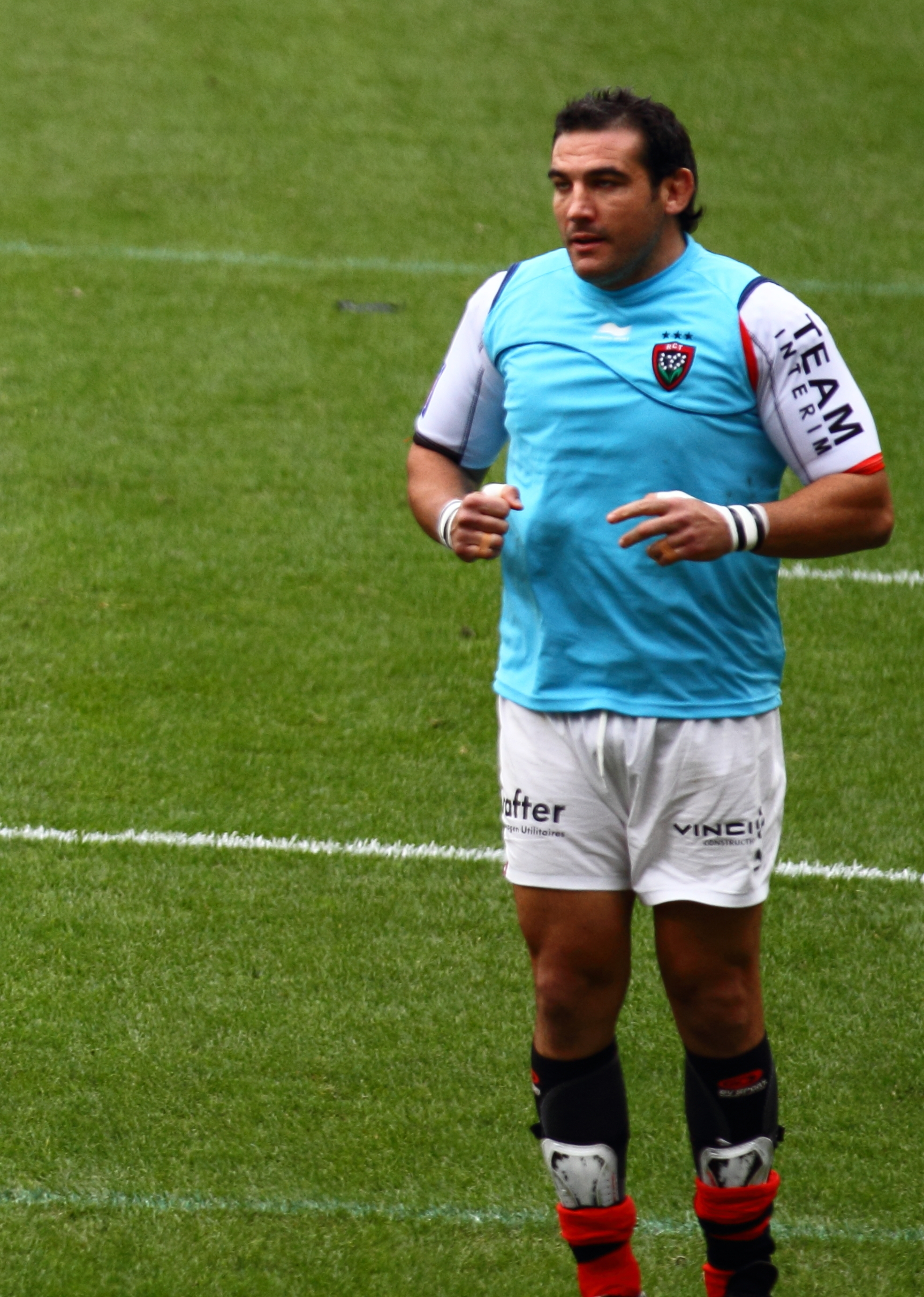
- Born: Laurent Emmanuelli; 19 September 1976 (age 50) Toulon, Var, France
- Height: 1.90 m (6 ft 3 in)
- Weight: 110 kg (17 st 5 lb)

Rugby union career
- Position: Loosehead prop
- Current team: RC Toulonnais
Senior career
Years	Team	Apps	(Points)
1998–2000	Toulon		
2000–2001	Stade Montois		
2001–2003	Stade Français	22	(5)
2003–2009	Clermont	145	(20)
2009–	Toulon	20	(0)

Laurent Emmanuelli (born 19 September 1976 in Toulon) is a French rugby union player who plays as a prop for Top 14 side RC Toulon. He has previously played for Stade Montois, Clermont Auvergne and Stade Français.

He won the 2006–07 European Challenge Cup and played in the final against Bath, his performance got him onto the stand-by list for the French squad in the 2007 Rugby World Cup.

== Honours ==
- Finalist of Top 14 : 2007
- Winner of European Challenge Cup : 2007
