= DeVere =

Name list

DeVere is a given name and surname. Notable people with the name include:

- Tristan de Vere Cole (born 1935), British director
- Arthur Devere Thomas GC (1895–1973) was awarded the George Cross in 1931
- Bubbles DeVere, fictional character in the BBC television sketch show Little Britain
- Devere Christensen (born 1918), former American water polo player
- DeVere Levelston (born 2001), American football player
- Luke DeVere (born 1989), Australian football (soccer) player
- Trish Van Devere (born 1943), American actress
- Horace de Vere Cole, English practical joker
- Henry de Vere Stacpoole, Irish author of The Blue Lagoon, inter alia
- Edward de Vere, 17th Earl of Southampton, putative author of some works attributed to Shakespeare

== See also ==
- De Vere (disambiguation)
