= Marchois =

Marchois may refer to:

- Marchois dialect, a dialect of France
- Arnaud Marchois, French sportsman

== See also ==
- French Wiktionary entry for "marchois"
