= 2006–07 European Challenge Cup pool stage =

- Season: 2006–07 European Challenge Cup
- Date: 20 October 2006 – 20 January 2007

Qualifiers
- Seed 1: (France) Clermont
- Seed 2: (England) Saracens
- Seed 3: (England) Bath
- Seed 4: (Wales) Newport Gwent Dragons
- Seed 5: (France) Brive
- Seed 6: (England) Bristol
- Seed 7: (Scotland) Glasgow Warriors
- Seed 8: (England) Newcastle Falcons

The 2006–07 European Challenge Cup pool stage was the opening stage of the 11th season of the European Challenge Cup, the second-tier competition for European rugby union clubs. It began with five matches on 20 October 2006 and ended with the final seven pool games on 20 January 2007.

Twenty teams participated in this phase of the competition; they were divided into five pools of four teams each, with each team playing the others home and away. Competition points were earned using the standard bonus point system. The five pool winners and the best three runners-up advanced to the knockout stage. These teams then competed in a single-elimination tournament that ended with the final at the Twickenham Stoop in London on 19 May 2007.

== Results ==
All times are local to the game location.

Key to colours
Winner of each pool, advance to quarterfinals. Seed # in parentheses
Three highest-scoring second-place teams advance to quarterfinals. Seed # in parentheses

=== Pool 1 ===
Team	P	W	D	L	Tries for	Tries against	Try diff	Points for	Points against	Points diff	TB	LB	Pts
(Wales) Newport Gwent Dragons (4)	6	5	0	1	29	10	19	211	79	132	4	1	25
(England) Bristol (6)	6	5	0	1	26	6	20	168	69	99	4	1	25
(Romania) București	6	1	0	5	15	35	−20	124	230	−106	3	1	8
(France) Bayonne	6	1	0	5	14	33	−19	106	231	−125	2	1	7

20 October 2006
19:30

Newport Gwent Dragons (Wales)	50–3	(France) Bayonne

Rodney Parade
Attendance: 5,112
Referee: Rob Debney

21 October 2006
15:00

București (Romania)	3–27	(England) Bristol Rugby

Steaua Stadium
Attendance: 1,000
Referee: Peter Fitzgibbon

27 October 2006
19:45

Bristol Rugby (England)	11–7	(Wales) Newport Gwent Dragons

Memorial Ground
Attendance: 8,113
Referee: Eric Darriere

28 October 2006
14:00

București (Romania)	32–27	(France) Bayonne

Steaua Stadium
Attendance: 1,000
Referee: Stefano Mancini

8 December 2006
19:30

Bayonne (France)	17–38	(England) Bristol Rugby

Stade Jean Dauger
Attendance: 5,000
Referee: Malcolm Changleng

8 December 2006
19:30

Newport Gwent Dragons (Wales)	66–10	(Romania) București

Rodney Parade
Attendance: 4,325
Referee: Giulio de Santis

15 December 2006
19:45

Bristol Rugby (England)	48–6	(France) Bayonne

Memorial Ground
Attendance: 5,400
Referee: Tim Hayes

16 December 2006
13:00

București (Romania)	29–39	(Wales) Newport Gwent Dragons

Steaua Stadium
Attendance: 500
Referee: Carlo Damasco

12 January 2007
19:30

Bayonne (France)	38–31	(Romania) București

Stade Jean Dauger
Attendance: 3,600
Referee: Paulo Ventura

12 January 2007
19:30

Newport Gwent Dragons (Wales)	17–11	(England) Bristol Rugby

Rodney Parade
Attendance: 6,834
Referee: Romain Poite

19 January 2007
19:30

Bristol Rugby (England)	33–19	(Romania) București

Memorial Ground
Attendance: 5,621
Referee: Jerome Garces

19 January 2007
20:30

Bayonne (France)	15–32	(Wales) Newport Gwent Dragons

Stade Jean Dauger
Attendance: 4,000
Referee: Stefano Mancini

=== Pool 2 ===
Team	P	W	D	L	Tries for	Tries against	Try diff	Points for	Points against	Points diff	TB	LB	Pts
(England) Saracens (2)	6	5	1	0	35	9	26	225	101	124	5	0	26
(Scotland) Glasgow Warriors (7)	6	4	1	1	25	10	15	204	72	132	3	1	22
(France) Narbonne	6	2	0	4	16	20	−4	127	171	−44	1	1	10
(Italy) Parma	6	0	0	6	6	43	−37	84	296	−212	0	1	1

21 October 2006
14:30

GRAN Parma (Italy)	16–19	(France) Narbonne

Sergio Lanfranchi
Attendance: 300
Referee: Andrew Macpherson

22 October 2006
15:00

Saracens (England)	28–23	(Scotland) Glasgow Warriors

Vicarage Road
Attendance: 4,266
Referee: Tim Hayes

27 October 2006
19:30

Glasgow Warriors (Scotland)	69–7	(Italy) GRAN Parma

Hughenden
Attendance: 1,707
Referee: Rob Debney

28 October 2006
19:30

Narbonne (France)	20–37	(England) Saracens

Parc des Sports et de l'Amitié
Attendance: 2,500
Referee: George Clancy

8 December 2006
19:30

Glasgow Warriors (Scotland)	51–7	(France) Narbonne

Hughenden
Attendance: 1,431
Referee: Carlo Damasco

10 December 2006
15:00

Saracens (England)	71–16	(Italy) GRAN Parma

Vicarage Road
Attendance: 3,379
Referee: David Rosich

16 December 2006
14:30

GRAN Parma (Italy)	16–36	(England) Saracens

Sergio Lanfranchi
Attendance: 800
Referee: Jerome Garces

16 December 2006
19:30

Narbonne (France)	7–8	(Scotland) Glasgow Warriors

Parc des Sports et de l'Amitié
Attendance: 4,500
Referee: Peter Fitzgibbon

13 January 2007
14:30

GRAN Parma (Italy)	17–47	(Scotland) Glasgow Warriors

Sergio Lanfranchi
Attendance: 700
Referee: Dean Richards

14 January 2007
15:00

Saracens (England)	47–20	(France) Narbonne

Vicarage Road
Attendance: 5,782
Referee: Carlo Damasco

19 January 2007
19:30

Glasgow Warriors (Scotland)	6–6	(England) Saracens

Hughenden
Attendance: 2,570
Referee: David Rosich

20 January 2007
19:30

Narbonne (France)	54–12	(Italy) GRAN Parma

Parc des Sports et de l'Amitié
Attendance: 2,500
Referee: Andrew Small

=== Pool 3 ===
Team	P	W	D	L	Tries for	Tries against	Try diff	Points for	Points against	Points diff	TB	LB	Pts
(France) Brive (5)	6	5	0	1	32	11	21	225	79	146	3	1	24
(England) Newcastle Falcons (8)	6	4	0	2	29	11	18	181	85	96	4	1	21
(France) Montauban	6	3	0	3	13	13	0	107	98	9	1	0	13
(Italy) Petrarca Padova	6	0	0	6	6	45	−39	47	298	−251	0	0	0

20 October 2006
19:00

Montauban (France)	13–26	(France) Brive

Stade de Sapiac
Attendance: 6,000
Referee: Andrew Small

20 October 2006
20:00

Newcastle Falcons (England)	50–5	(Italy) Petrarca Padova

Kingston Park
Attendance: 4,233
Referee: James Jones

28 October 2006
15:00

Brive (France)	41–12	(England) Newcastle Falcons

Stadium Municipal, Brive
Attendance: 8,000
Referee: Hugh Watkins

28 October 2006
15:00

Petrarca Padova (Italy)	5–53	(France) Montauban

Stadio Plebiscito
Attendance: 1,200
Referee: Dean Richards

8 December 2006
19:00

Montauban (France)	16–10	(England) Newcastle Falcons

Stade de Sapiac
Attendance: 4,000
Referee: George Clancy

9 December 2006
15:00

Brive (France)	78–18	(Italy) Petrarca Padova

Stadium Municipal, Brive
Attendance: 3,000
Referee: Rob Debney

16 December 2006
15:00

Petrarca Padova (Italy)	6–48	(France) Brive

Stadio Plebiscito
Attendance: 500
Referee: Peter Allan

17 December 2006
15:00

Newcastle Falcons (England)	35–0	(France) Montauban

Kingston Park
Attendance: 4,895
Referee: Malcolm Changleng

12 January 2007
19:00

Montauban (France)	19–7	(Italy) Petrarca Padova

Stade de Sapiac
Attendance: 4,000
Referee: Rob Debney

12 January 2007
20:00

Newcastle Falcons (England)	24–17	(France) Brive

Kingston Park
Attendance: 4,388
Referee: Peter Fitzgibbon

20 January 2007
15:00

Brive (France)	15–6	(France) Montauban

Stadium Municipal, Brive
Attendance: 6,500
Referee: Dean Richards

20 January 2008
15:00

Petrarca Padova (Italy)	6–50	(England) Newcastle Falcons

Stadio Plebiscito
Attendance: 1,700
Referee: Neil Paterson

=== Pool 4 ===
Team	P	W	D	L	Tries for	Tries against	Try diff	Points for	Points against	Points diff	TB	LB	Pts
(England) Bath Rugby (3)	6	6	0	0	21	9	12	164	106	58	2	0	26
(England) NEC Harlequins	6	4	0	2	18	13	5	171	109	62	3	2	21
(Ireland) Connacht Rugby	6	1	0	5	15	16	−1	119	150	−31	2	2	8
(France) Montpellier	6	1	0	5	13	29	−16	116	205	−89	0	1	5

20 October 2006
19:00

Connacht Rugby (Ireland)	18–19	(England) NEC Harlequins

Sportsground
Attendance: 2,561
Referee: Romain Poite

20 October 2006
19:30

Montpellier (France)	14–21	(England) Bath Rugby

Stade Sabathe
Attendance: 5,000
Referee: Peter Allan

28 October 2006
14:15

Bath Rugby (England)	21–19	(Ireland) Connacht Rugby

Recreation Ground
Attendance: 10,308
Referee: David Rosich

28 October 2006
20:45

NEC Harlequins (England)	57–10	(France) Montpellier

The Stoop
Attendance: 9,020
Referee: Carlo Damasco

8 December 2006
18:30

Connacht Rugby (Ireland)	26–13	(France) Montpellier

Sportsground
Attendance: 1,200
Referee: Sean Davey

9 December 2006
15:00

NEC Harlequins (England)	18–24	(England) Bath Rugby

The Stoop
Attendance: 10,522
Referee: Eric Darriere

15 December 2006
19:30

Montpellier (France)	35–22	(Ireland) Connacht Rugby

Stade Sabathe
Attendance: 1,800
Referee: Rob Debney

16 December 2006
14:15

Bath Rugby (England)	20–14	(England) NEC Harlequins

Recreation Ground
Attendance: 10,600
Referee: Andrew Macpherson

12 January 2007
19:0

Connacht Rugby (Ireland)	24–36	(England) Bath Rugby

Sportsground
Attendance: 2,244
Referee: Tim Hayes

12 January 2007
19:30

Montpellier (France)	27–37	(England) NEC Harlequins

Stade Sabathe
Attendance: 4,200
Referee: James Jones

20 January 2007
14:15

Bath Rugby (England)	42–17	(France) Montpellier

Recreation Ground
Attendance: 10,265
Referee: Peter Fitzgibbon

20 January 2007
14:15

NEC Harlequins (England)	26–10	(Ireland) Connacht Rugby

The Stoop
Attendance: 9,053
Referee: David Changleng

=== Pool 5 ===
Team	P	W	D	L	Tries for	Tries against	Try diff	Points for	Points against	Points diff	TB	LB	Pts
(France) Clermont (1)	6	6	0	0	27	13	14	210	107	103	4	0	28
(England) Worcester Warriors	6	4	0	2	22	13	9	141	99	42	3	1	20
(Italy) Rugby Viadana	6	2	0	4	12	20	−8	114	145	−31	1	2	11
(France) Albi	6	0	0	6	7	22	−15	66	180	−114	0	0	0

21 October 2006
15:00

Worcester Warriors (England)	25–7	(Italy) Rugby Viadana

Sixways Stadium
Attendance: 5,526
Referee: David Rosich

21 October 2006
18:30

Albi (France)	21–30	(France) Clermont

La Maison des Sports
Attendance: 3,734
Referee: Carlo Damasco

27 October 2006
20:00

Rugby Viadana (Italy)	26–13	(France) Albi

Stadio Luigi Zaffanella
Attendance: 1,200
Referee: Andrew Macpherson

28 October 2006
15:00

Clermont (France)	29–23	(England) Worcester Warriors

Stade Marcel Michelin
Attendance: 8,000
Referee: James Jones

9 December 2006
15:00

Worcester Warriors (England)	29–0	(France) Albi

Sixways Stadium
Attendance: 4,917
Referee: Stefano Mancini

10 December 2006
15:00

Viadana (Italy)	9–14	(France) Clermont

Stadio Luigi Zaffanella
Attendance: 1,100
Referee: Dean Richards

16 December 2006
15:00

Clermont (France)	57–29	(Italy) Rugby Viadana

Stade Marcel Michelin
Attendance: 8,210
Referee: Andrew Small

16 December 2006
18:30

Albi (France)	12–23	(England) Worcester Warriors

La Maison des Sports
Attendance: 3,500
Referee: Simon McDowell

13 January 2007
15:00

Worcester Warriors (England)	22–35	(France) Clermont

Sixways Stadium
Attendance: 5,848
Referee: Andrew Macpherson

13 January 2007
18:30

Albi (France)	17–27	(Italy) Rugby Viadana

La Maison des Sports
Attendance: 3,000
Referee: Andrew Small

20 January 2007
15:00

Clermont (France)	45–3	(France) Albi

Stade Marcel Michelin
Attendance: 8,000
Referee: David Keane

20 January 2007
15:00

Rugby Viadana (Italy)	16–19	(England) Worcester Warriors

Stadio Luigi Zaffanella
Attendance: 2,000
Referee: Pascal Gauzere

== Seeding and runners-up ==
Seed	Pool Winners	Pts	TF	+/-
1	(France) Clermont	28	27	+103
2	(England) Saracens	26	35	+124
3	(England) Bath	26	21	+58
4	(Wales) Newport Gwent Dragons	25	29	+132
5	(France) Brive	24	32	+146
Seed	Pool Runners-up	Pts	TF	+/-
6	(England) Bristol	25	29	+132
7	(Scotland) Glasgow Warriors	22	25	+132
8	(England) Newcastle Falcons	21	29	+96
–	(England) Harlequins	21	18	+62
–	(England) Worcester Warriors	20	22	+42

== See also ==
- European Challenge Cup
- 2006–07 Heineken Cup
