= Andy Leslie =

New Zealand international rugby union player

Andy Leslie ONZM JP
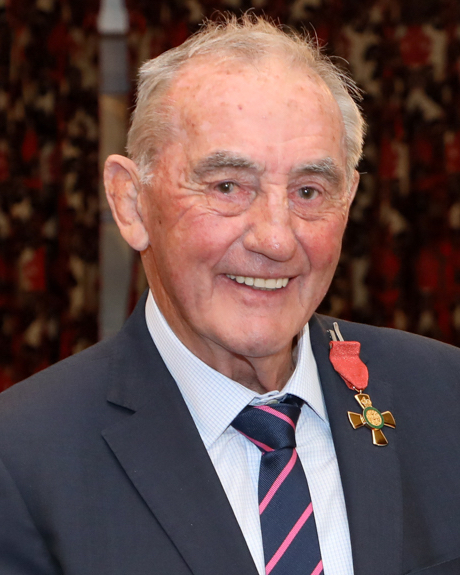
- Leslie in 2023
- Born: Andrew Roy Leslie; 10 November 1944 (age 82) Lower Hutt, New Zealand
- Height: 1.88 m (6 ft 2 in)
- Weight: 90 kg (14 st 2 lb)
- School: Hutt Valley Technical College
- Notable relative(s): John Leslie (son); Martin Leslie (son)
- Occupation: Retired

Rugby union career
- Position: Number eight
Provincial / State sides
Years	Team	Apps	(Points)
1964	Wellington Colts	1	(7)
1965-1966	Wellington B	2	(3)
1967-1977	Wellington	144	(133)
1970-1977	NZ Trial	8	(11)
1973, 1977-78	Barbarians	6	(0)
1974, 1978-79	Centurions	3	(16)
1978	Petone Invitational XVs	1	(4)
International career
Years	Team	Apps	(Points)
1974–1976	New Zealand	10	(4)
Coaching career
- Years: Team
- 1990–1992: Wellington
- –: Garryowen

Andrew Roy Leslie ONZM JP (born 10 November 1944) is a former New Zealand rugby union player. A number eight, he represented Wellington domestically and captained the All Black at international level. He was captain during the controversial 1976 New Zealand rugby union tour of South Africa. On 26 April 2007 he was elected as the president of the New Zealand Rugby Football Union.

In the 2001 Queen's Birthday Honours, Leslie was appointed a Member of the New Zealand Order of Merit, for services to rugby. He was promoted to Officer of the New Zealand Order of Merit, for services to sport and the community, in the 2023 King's Birthday and Coronation Honours.

== Early life ==
Andy Leslie was born on 10 November 1944 in city of Lower Hutt in the Wellington region. His father, Andy Leslie Senior, was a professional rugby player in Scotland who moved to Wellington in 1927 then played for the Petone Football Club off and on between 1927 and 1945. Leslie's goal as a young rugby player was to eventually join the Petone senior rugby team like his dad.

He began playing rugby during primary school, but the first sport he represented New Zealand for was water polo at the Colts level.

Leslie was then selected for the New Zealand softball team, The Pilgrims, in 1966 where he was an outfielder. He participated in the first Men's Softball World Championship in Mexico City where they won a bronze medal.

In 1968, Leslie was picked for the national basketball team for a tour of China that was later cancelled.

== Rugby career ==
=== All Blacks ===
==== All Blacks statistics ====
- Tests: 10 (10 as Captain)
- Games: 24 (23 as Captain)
- Total Matches: 34 (33 as Captain)
- Test Points: 4pts (1t, 0c, 0p, 0dg, 0m)
- Game Points: 24pts (6t, 0c, 0p, 0dg, 0m)
- Total Points: 28pts (7t, 0c, 0p, 0dg, 0m)

=== International tries ===
Try	Opposing team	Location	Venue	Competition	Status	Date	Result	Score
1	Australia South Australia	Norwood, Australia	Norwood Oval	1974 New Zealand rugby union tour of Australia and Fiji	Tour Match	1 May 1974	Win	6 - 117
2	Australia New South Wales	Sydney, Australia	Sydney Cricket Ground	1974 New Zealand rugby union tour of Australia and Fiji	Tour Match	18 May 1974	Win	0 - 20
3	Australia	Brisbane, Australia	Ballymore Stadium	1974 New Zealand rugby union tour of Australia and Fiji	Test Match	1 June 1974	Win	0 - 20
4	England Barbarians	London, England	Twickenham Stadium	1974 New Zealand rugby union tour of Ireland, Wales and England	Tour Match	30 November 1974	Draw	13 - 13
5	South Africa Western Transvaal	Potchefstroom, South Africa	Olen Park	1976 New Zealand rugby union tour of South Africa	Tour Match	28 July 1976	Win	3 - 42
6	South Africa Northern Transvaal	Pretoria, South Africa	Loftus Versfield Stadium	1976 New Zealand rugby union tour of South Africa	Tour Match	21 August 1976	Loss	29 - 27
7	South Africa Natal Sharks	Durban, South Africa	Kings Park Stadium	1976 New Zealand rugby union tour of South Africa	Tour Match	28 August 1976	Win	13 - 42

== Personal life ==
Andy Leslie and his wife, Lesley Leslie, have two sons: John Leslie (born 1970) and Martin Leslie (born 1971). Both sons went on to play for the Scotland national rugby team starting in 1998 and played in the 1999 Rugby World Cup.

After retirement, he coached for Wellington and joined his former teammate Bob Scott's menswear company named Scott and Leslie Menswear before passing the business to his son in 2000. Leslie and the company helped to establish the Jackson Street Programme's Walk of Champions in Petone.

=== Foundations ===
Leslie was a part of the founding group (known as the First XV) of the New Zealand Rugby Foundation (NZRF), founded in 1986. He then became a NZRF officer in 2002 and served as NZRF President from 2013 to 2023.

Leslie is currently a patron for the New Zealand Amateur Sports Association (NZASA) as of 2026.

Sporting positions
Preceded by Ian Kirkpatrick	All Blacks captain 1974–1976	Succeeded by Tane Norton
