= 2006–07 Top 14 season =

French rugby union season

- Countries: France
- Champions: Stade Français (13th title)
- Runners-up: Clermont
- Relegated: Narbonne, Agen
- Matches played: 185
- Attendance: 2,065,975 (average 11,167 per match)
- Highest attendance: 79,741; Stade Français v Toulouse; 27 January 2007
- Lowest attendance: 4,553; Bourgoin v Montpellier; 26 September 2006
- Top point scorer: (Australia) Brock James (Clermont); 377 points
- Top try scorer: (France) Aurélien Rougerie (Clermont); 13 tries

The 2006–07 Top 14 competition was the 108th French domestic rugby union club competition operated by the Ligue Nationale de Rugby (LNR) and the 2nd using the name Top 14. Biarritz were out to defend their crown, after their defeat of Toulouse in the 2005–06 Top 14 final. New teams to the league included Albi and Montauban who were promoted from 2004–05 Pro D2, replacing relegated sides Toulon and Pau. During the season attendance records in the league were once again broken with 79,741 attending the Round 19 clash between Stade Français and Toulouse at the Stade de France, and over 2 million supporters attended games across the campaign.

In the league Stade Français jumped out to an early lead, winning their first nine matches. Although they faded somewhat as the season went on, they held on to top the regular-season ladder. Toulouse and Clermont each entered the final week with a chance to top the ladder, but Stade Français' win over Agen (without a bonus point) made it impossible for Clermont to overtake them, while Toulouse failed to secure the bonus point in their win over Bourgoin that would have made it possible for them to pip the Parisians for the top seed. The last playoff berth came down to the last round between Biarritz and Perpignan, with Biarritz securing fourth place in style with a bonus-point win over Castres.

The final Heineken Cup berth came down to the last round as well, with Bourgoin holding off the challenge of Top 14 newcomers Montauban. The relegation battle came down to the last week. Narbone had been assured of the drop after Round 25, while any of six other clubs were in mathematical danger of the drop going into the final week. In the end, Agen, who were next-to-last entering the final week, were consigned to the drop by league leaders Stade Français. Both clubs would be relegated to the 2007–08 Pro D2.

The play-offs saw Stade Français and Clermont win their respective semi-finals to qualify for the final. In the end it was Stade Français who lifted the Bouclier de Brennus as Top 14 champions for the 13th time in the club's history, beating Clermont 23–18 at the Stade de France.

== Teams ==
Club	City (department)	Stadium	Capacity	Previous season
Agen	Agen (Lot-et-Garonne)	Stade Armandie	13,000	5th
Albi	Albi (Tarn)	Stadium Municipal d'Albi	12,000	Promoted from Pro D2 (runners up)
Bayonne	Bayonne (Pyrénées-Atlantiques)	Stade Jean Dauger	16,934	12th
Biarritz	Biarritz (Pyrénées-Atlantiques)	Parc des Sports Aguiléra	15,000	Champions (1st in league)
Bourgoin	Bourgoin-Jallieu (Isère)	Stade Pierre Rajon (Note: Bourgoin would also play one game at the 35,616 capacity Stade Geoffroy-Guichard in Saint-Étienne.)	9,441	6th
Brive	Brive-la-Gaillarde (Corrèze)	Stade Amédée-Domenech	15,000	9th
Castres	Castres (Tarn)	Stade Pierre-Fabre	11,500	7th
Clermont	Clermont-Ferrand (Puy-de-Dôme)	Stade Marcel-Michelin	16,334	8th
Montauban	Montauban (Tarn-et-Garonne)	Stade Sapiac	11,500	Promoted from Pro D2 (champions)
Montpellier	Montpellier (Hérault)	Stade Sabathé	8,000	11th
Narbonne	Narbonne (Aude)	Parc des Sports Et de l'Amitié	12,000	10th
Perpignan	Perpignan (Pyrénées-Orientales)	Stade Aimé Giral	16,593	Semi-finals (4th in league)
Stade Français	Paris, 16th arrondissement	Stade Jean-Bouin (Note: Stade Français would also play three games at the 81,338 capacity Stade de France.)	12,000	Semi-finals (2nd in league)
Toulouse	Toulouse (Haute-Garonne)	Stade Ernest-Wallon (Note: Toulouse would also play three games at the 35,575 capacity Stadium Municipal.)	19,500	Runners up (3rd in league)

Locations of the 2006–07 Top 14 teams

== Table ==
Pos	Team	Pld	W	D	L	PF	PA	PD	B	Pts	Qualification or relegation
1	Stade Français (C)	26	19	1	6	667	433	+234	9	87	Advance to playoffs Qualified for the 2007–08 Heineken Cup
2	Toulouse (SF)	26	18	2	6	643	424	+219	10	86	Advance to playoffs Qualified for the 2007–08 Heineken Cup
3	Clermont (F)	26	18	0	8	772	454	+318	11	83	Advance to playoffs Qualified for the 2007–08 Heineken Cup
4	Biarritz (SF)	26	16	1	9	549	385	+164	10	76	Advance to playoffs Qualified for the 2007–08 Heineken Cup
5	Perpignan	26	16	1	9	493	398	+95	9	75	Qualified for the 2007–08 Heineken Cup
6	Bourgoin	26	11	1	14	543	484	+59	12	58	Qualified for the 2007–08 Heineken Cup
7	Montauban	26	10	2	14	475	493	−18	10	54	
8	Bayonne	26	11	1	14	452	647	−195	5	51	
9	Brive	26	10	1	15	419	516	−97	8	50	
10	Albi	26	11	1	14	333	512	−179	4	50	
11	Castres	26	9	1	16	531	576	−45	11	49	
12	Montpellier	26	9	1	16	442	596	−154	10	48	
13	Agen (R)	26	9	1	16	382	520	−138	6	44	Relegated to the 2007–08 Rugby Pro D2
14	Narbonne (R)	26	8	0	18	521	784	−263	7	39	Relegated to the 2007–08 Rugby Pro D2

(C) Champion; (R) Relegated

The seventh-place team would have received a Heineken Cup place if a French club had advanced farther in that season's Heineken Cup than any club from England or Italy. However, the quarterfinal losses of Biarritz and Stade Français, the last two remaining French sides in the 2006–07 Heineken Cup, to English sides Northampton Saints and Leicester Tigers, meant that the "extra" Heineken Cup place would go to England. (The remaining two semifinalists were another English side, eventual winners London Wasps, and Welsh side Llanelli Scarlets.)

The 2007–08 Heineken Cup was in doubt earlier this season. French clubs announced plans to boycott the competition, and the English PRL clubs joined them, demanding a financial stake in the competition from the RFU. However, recent negotiations have ensured that top teams from both countries will now play.

== Fixtures & Results ==
=== Round 1 ===
18 August 2006

Biarritz	29–24	Clermont (1 BP)

Parc des Sports Aguiléra
Attendance: 12,631

19 August 2006

(1 BP) Stade Français	52–20	Montpellier

Stade Jean-Bouin
Attendance: 8,150

19 August 2006

Albi	24–12	Bayonne

Stadium Municipal d'Albi
Attendance: 5,088

19 August 2006

Agen	18–6	Bourgoin

Stade Armandie
Attendance: 7,164

19 August 2006

(1 BP) Montauban	41–20	Narbonne

Stade Sapiac
Attendance: 6,403

19 August 2006

Perpignan	20–16	Castres (1 BP)

Stade Aimé Giral
Attendance: 13,860

19 August 2006

Brive	9–24	Toulouse

Stade Amédée-Domenech
Attendance: 12,747

=== Round 2 ===
25 August 2006

Castres	16–26	Stade Français

Stade Pierre-Fabre
Attendance: 6,669

25 August 2006

Montpellier	26–7	Agen

Stade Sabathé
Attendance: 5,449

26 August 2006

(1 BP) Bourgoin	42–17	Brive

Stade Pierre Rajon
Attendance: 5,080

26 August 2006

(1 BP) Toulouse	23–0	Albi

Stade Ernest-Wallon
Attendance: 16,548

26 August 2006

Bayonne	9–20	Montauban

Stade Jean Dauger
Attendance: 9,815

26 August 2006

Narbonne	25–18	Biarritz (1 BP)

Parc des Sports Et de l'Amitié
Attendance: 7,299

26 August 2006

Clermont	25–12	Perpignan

Stade Marcel-Michelin
Attendance: 10,556

=== Round 3 ===
30 August 2006

Albi	21–18	Bourgoin (1 BP)

Stadium Municipal d'Albi
Attendance: 5,054

30 August 2006

(1 BP) Montauban	19–24	Toulouse

Stade Sapiac
Attendance: 9,053

30 August 2006

(1 BP) Biarritz	54–0	Bayonne

Parc des Sports Aguiléra
Attendance: 13,013

30 August 2006

(1 BP) Perpignan	45–6	Narbonne

Stade Aimé Giral
Attendance: 12,826

30 August 2006

(1 BP) Stade Français	45–13	Clermont

Stade Jean-Bouin
Attendance: 8,935

30 August 2006

Montpellier	20–16	Castres (1 BP)

Stade Sabathé
Attendance: 5,807

30 August 2006

Agen	22–16	Brive (1 BP)

Stade Armandie
Attendance: 6,515

=== Round 4 ===
3 September 2006

(1 BP) Bourgoin	35–22	Montauban

Stade Pierre Rajon
Attendance: 5,050

3 September 2006

Toulouse	20–3	Biarritz

Stade Municipal
Attendance: 28,955

3 September 2006

Bayonne	9–20	Perpignan

Stade Jean Dauger
Attendance: 7,969

3 September 2006

Narbonne	24–33	Stade Français

Parc des Sports Et de l'Amitié
Attendance: 7,332

3 September 2006

(1 BP) Clermont	55–7	Montpellier

Stade Marcel-Michelin
Attendance: 9,791

3 September 2006

Brive	6–3	Albi (1 BP)

Stade Amédée-Domenech
Attendance: 6,908

3 September 2006

Castres	31–26	Agen (1 BP)

Stade Pierre-Fabre
Attendance: 5,784

=== Round 5 ===
8 September 2006

Biarritz	12–6	Bourgoin (1 BP)

Parc des Sports Aguiléra
Attendance: 8,355

9 September 2006

Perpignan	30–17	Toulouse

Stade Aimé Giral
Attendance: 13,250

9 September 2006

(1 BP) Stade Français	48–29	Bayonne

Stade Jean-Bouin
Attendance: 8,455

9 September 2006

(1 BP) Montpellier	33–10	Narbonne

Stade Sabathé
Attendance: 5,825

9 September 2006

Castres	13–9	Clermont (1 BP)

Stade Pierre-Fabre
Attendance: 5,850

9 September 2006

Montauban	21–20	Brive (1 BP)

Stade Sapiac
Attendance: 6,014

9 September 2006

(1 BP) Agen	32–3	Albi

Stade Armandie
Attendance: 6,776

=== Round 6 ===
15 September 2006

Bourgoin	22–3	Perpignan

Stade Pierre Rajon
Attendance: 5,839

16 September 2006

(1 BP) Toulouse	12–16	Stade Français

Stade Muncipal
Attendance: 33,661

16 September 2006

Bayonne	25–20	Montpellier (1 BP)

Stade Jean Dauger
Attendance: 9,481

16 September 2006

(1 BP) Narbonne	39–17	Castres

Parc des Sports Et de l'Amitié
Attendance: 6,236

16 September 2006

(1 BP) Brive	14–21	Biarritz

Stade Amédée-Domenech
Attendance: 7,817

16 September 2006

Albi	12–10	Montauban (1 BP)

Stadium Municipal d'Albi
Attendance: 6,373

16 September 2006

Clermont	20–3	Agen

Stade Marcel-Michelin
Attendance: 9,892

=== Round 7 ===
22 September 2006

Montpellier	9–9	Toulouse

Stade Sabathé
Attendance: 6,545

23 September 2006

(1 BP) Stade Français	41–27	Bourgoin

Stade Jean-Bouin
Attendance: 8,485

23 September 2006

(1 BP) Castres	39–15	Bayonne

Stade Pierre-Fabre
Attendance: 5,918

23 September 2006

(1 BP) Clermont	43–0	Narbonne

Stade Marcel-Michelin
Attendance: 8,943

23 September 2006

(1 BP) Perpignan	24–13	Brive

Stade Aimé Giral
Attendance: 11,454

23 September 2006

Biarritz	20–6	Albi

Parc des Sports Aguiléra
Attendance: 7,592

23 September 2006

Agen	13–9	Montauban (1 BP)

Stade Armandie
Attendance: 7,171

=== Round 8 ===
26 September 2006

Bourgoin	25–3	Montpellier

Stade Pierre Rajon
Attendance: 4,553

26 September 2006

(1 BP) Toulouse	35–3	Castres

Stade Ernest-Wallon
Attendance: 14,535

26 September 2006

Bayonne	24–13	Clermont

Stade Jean Dauger
Attendance: 9,568

26 September 2006

Brive	6–21	Stade Français

Stade Amédée-Domenech
Attendance: 9,629

26 September 2006

Albi	16–7	Perpignan

Stadium Municipal d'Albi
Attendance: 6,431

26 September 2006

Montauban	19–13	Biarritz (1 BP)

Stade Sapiac
Attendance: 7,216

26 September 2006

Narbonne	33–18	Agen

Parc des Sports Et de l'Amitié
Attendance: 6,266

=== Round 9 ===
30 September 2006

Agen	20–18	Biarritz (1 BP)

Stade Armandie
Attendance: 7,245

30 September 2006

Castres	18–16	Bourgoin (1 BP)

Stade Pierre-Fabre
Attendance: 6,211

30 September 2006

Narbonne	25–12	Bayonne

Parc des Sports Et de l'Amitié
Attendance: 7,033

30 September 2006

(1 BP) Montpellier	12–17	Brive

Stade Sabathé
Attendance: 5,540

30 September 2006

(1 BP) Perpignan	13–18	Montauban

Stade Aimé Giral
Attendance: 11,824

30 September 2006

Stade Français	25–12	Albi

Stade Jean-Bouin
Attendance: 8,549

30 September 2006

(1 BP) Clermont	46–9	Toulouse

Stade Marcel-Michelin
Attendance: 13,376

=== Round 10 ===
6 October 2006

Montauban	15–9	Stade Français (1 BP)

Stade Sapiac
Attendance: 9,046

7 October 2006

Biarritz	25–10	Perpignan

Parc des Sports Aguiléra
Attendance: 8,326

7 October 2006

Albi	15–9	Montpellier (1 BP)

Stadium Municipal d'Albi
Attendance: 5,623

7 October 2006

Bayonne	19–15	Agen (1 BP)

Stade Jean Dauger
Attendance: 10,539

7 October 2006

Brive	22–15	Castres (1 BP)

Stade Amédée-Domenech
Attendance: 7,461

7 October 2006

Toulouse	40–34	Narbonne (1 BP)

Stade Ernest-Wallon
Attendance: 14,232

7 October 2006

(1 BP) Bourgoin	22–28	Clermont

Stade Geoffroy-Guichard, Saint-Étienne
Attendance: 16,914

=== Round 11 ===
14 October 2006

Bayonne	9–20	Toulouse

Stade Jean Dauger
Attendance: 12,858

14 October 2006

(1 BP) Castres	16–19	Albi

Stade Pierre-Fabre
Attendance: 9,091

14 October 2006

(1 BP) Clermont	44–3	Brive

Stade Marcel-Michelin
Attendance: 12,264

14 October 2006

Montpellier	19–17	Montauban (1 BP)

Stade Sabathé
Attendance: 5,877

14 October 2006

(1 BP) Narbonne	20–23	Bourgoin

Parc des Sports Et de l'Amitié
Attendance: 7,016

14 October 2006

(1 BP) Agen	6–13	Perpignan

Stade Armandie
Attendance: 6,386

14 October 2006

Stade Français	22–16	Biarritz (1 BP)

Stade de France
Attendance: 79,619

=== Round 12 ===
3 November 2006

Albi	6–27	Clermont

Stadium Municipal d'Albi
Attendance: 6,882

4 November 2006

Perpignan	11–10	Stade Français (1 BP)

Stade Aimé Giral
Attendance: 13,116

4 November 2006

(1 BP) Biarritz	44–11	Montpellier

Parc des Sports Aguiléra
Attendance: 7,740

4 November 2006

(1 BP) Bourgoin	39–10	Bayonne

Stade Pierre Rajon
Attendance: 5,139

4 November 2006

Brive	23–21	Narbonne (1 BP)

Stade Amédée-Domenech
Attendance: 8,487

4 November 2006

Montauban	15–15	Castres

Stade Sapiac
Attendance: 7,497

4 November 2006

Agen	24–16	Toulouse

Stade Armandie
Attendance: 11,293

=== Round 13 ===
10 November 2006

Toulouse	25–15	Bourgoin

Stade Ernest-Wallon
Attendance: 13,557

11 November 2006

Stade Français	31–8	Agen

Stade Jean-Bouin
Attendance: 8,356

11 November 2006

(1 BP) Bayonne	29–6	Brive

Stade Jean Dauger
Attendance: 9,385

11 November 2006

(1 BP) Castres	12–16	Biarritz

Stade Pierre-Fabre
Attendance: 6,299

11 November 2006

(1 BP) Montpellier	12–15	Perpignan

Stade Sabathé
Attendance: 6,417

11 November 2006

(1 BP) Narbonne	50–12	Albi

Parc des Sports Et de l'Amitié
Attendance: 6,825

11 November 2006

Clermont	27–16	Montauban

Stade Marcel-Michelin
Attendance: 10,066

=== Round 14 ===
17 November 2006

Montpellier	25–13	Stade Français

Stade Sabathé
Attendance: 5,846

18 November 2006

Clermont	25–17	Biarritz

Stade Marcel-Michelin
Attendance: 12,865

18 November 2006

Bayonne	15–9	Albi (1 BP)

Stade Jean Dauger
Attendance: 10,540

18 November 2006

Bourgoin	31–18	Agen

Stade Pierre Rajon
Attendance: 4,740

18 November 2006

Narbonne	37–33	Montauban (1 BP)

Parc des Sports Et de l'Amitié
Attendance: 7,265

18 November 2006

(1 BP) Toulouse	26–29	Brive

Stade Ernest-Wallon
Attendance: 13,902

18 November 2006

Castres	19–13	Perpignan (1 BP)

Stade Pierre-Fabre
Attendance: 5,652

=== Round 15 ===
24 November 2006

(1 BP) Stade Français	43–18	Castres

Stade Jean-Bouin
Attendance: 6,698

24 November 2006

Albi	13–13	Toulouse

Stadium Municipal d'Albi
Attendance: 8,555

25 November 2006

Agen	14–9	Montpellier (1 BP)

Stade Armandie
Attendance: 5,321

25 November 2006

(1 BP) Biarritz	42–14	Narbonne

Parc des Sports Aguiléra
Attendance: 6,711

25 November 2006

Brive	28–3	Bourgoin

Stade Amédée-Domenech
Attendance: 8,077

25 November 2006

(1 BP) Montauban	17–18	Bayonne

Stade Sapiac
Attendance: 6,675

25 November 2006

(1 BP) Perpignan	32–15	Clermont

Stade Aimé Giral
Attendance: 11,838

=== Round 16 ===
1 December 2006

(1 BP) Bayonne	11–15	Biarritz

Stade Jean Dauger
Attendance: 13,841

2 December 2006

(1 BP) Bourgoin	36–11	Albi

Stade Pierre Rajon
Attendance: 4,816

2 December 2006

Toulouse	30–21	Montauban

Stade Ernest-Wallon
Attendance: 17,752

2 December 2006

(BP) Narbonne	15–19	Perpignan

Parc des Sports Et de l'Amitié
Attendance: 9,483

2 December 2006

Clermont	29–17	Stade Français

Stade Marcel-Michelin
Attendance: 13,685

2 December 2006

(1 BP) Castres	51–13	Montpellier

Stade Pierre-Fabre
Attendance: 5,768

2 December 2006

Brive	19–13	Agen (1 BP)

Stade Amédée-Domenech
Attendance: 10,098

=== Round 17 ===
22 December 2006

Agen	20–9	Castres

Stade Armandie
Attendance: 5,680

23 December 2006

Montauban	26–17	Bourgoin

Stade Sapiac
Attendance: 6,066

23 December 2006

Montpellier	18–31	Clermont

Stade Sabathé
Attendance: 6,048

23 December 2006

(1 BP) Perpignan	36–30	Bayonne (1 BP)

Stade Aimé Giral
Attendance: 12,051

23 December 2006

(1 BP) Stade Français	41–0	Narbonne

Stade Jean-Bouin
Attendance: 8,263

23 December 2006

Albi	19–3	Brive

Stadium Municipal d'Albi
Attendance: 5,453

23 December 2006

(1 BP) Biarritz	16–21	Toulouse

Parc des Sports Aguiléra
Attendance: 11,667

=== Round 18 ===
6 January 2007

Bourgoin	9–0	Biarritz

Stade Pierre Rajon
Attendance: 6,833

6 January 2007

Toulouse	16–12	Perpignan (1 BP)

Stade Ernest-Wallon
Attendance: 18,914

6 January 2007

Albi	16–6	Agen

Stadium Municipal d'Albi
Attendance: 6,408

6 January 2007

(1 BP) Brive	11–16	Montauban

Stade Amédée-Domenech
Attendance: 8,814

6 January 2007

Clermont	30–23	Castres (1 BP)

Stade Marcel-Michelin
Attendance: 11,185

6 January 2007

Narbonne	32–9	Montpellier

Parc des Sports Et de l'Amitié
Attendance: 7,648

6 January 2007

Bayonne	29–27	Stade Français (1 BP)

Stade Jean Dauger
Attendance: 12,821

=== Round 19 ===
26 January 2007

(1 BP) Montpellier	39–17	Bayonne

Stade Sabathé
Attendance: 6,049

27 January 2007

Agen	22–18	Clermont (1 BP)

Stade Armandie
Attendance: 7,196

27 January 2007

(1 BP) Castres	62–14	Narbonne

Stade Pierre-Fabre
Attendance: 6,667

27 January 2007

Biarritz	15–6	Brive

Parc des Sports Aguiléra
Attendance: 7,296

27 January 2007

(1 BP) Montauban	15–19	Albi

Stade Sapiac
Attendance: 7,841

27 January 2007

Perpignan	16–9	Bourgoin (1 BP)

Stade Aimé Giral
Attendance: 13,102

27 January 2007

Stade Français	22–20	Toulouse (1 BP)

Stade de France
Attendance: 79,741

=== Round 20 ===
23 March 2007

Albi	10–23	Biarritz

Stadium Municipal d'Albi
Attendance: 7,411

24 March 2007

Bourgoin	19–19	Stade Français

Stade Pierre Rajon
Attendance: 8,057

24 March 2007

Bayonne	19–12	Castres (1 BP)

Stade Jean Dauger
Attendance: 12,496

24 March 2007

Brive	22–22	Perpignan

Stade Amédée-Domenech
Attendance: 11,978

24 March 2007

Montauban	22–12	Agen

Stade Sapiac
Attendance: 7,975

24 March 2007

(1 BP) Toulouse	28–10	Montpellier

Stade Muncipal
Attendance: 19,551

24 March 2007

Narbonne (1 BP)	26–29	Clermont (1 BP)

Parc des Sports Et de l'Amitié
Attendance: 8,870

=== Round 21 ===
6 April 2007

Montpellier	19–7	Bourgoin

Stade Sabathé
Attendance: 6,144

7 April 2007

Castres	19–35	Toulouse (1 BP)

Stade Pierre-Fabre
Attendance: 9,293

7 April 2007

Stade Français	18–13	Brive (1 BP)

Stade Jean-Bouin
Attendance: 8,960

7 April 2007

(1 BP) Agen	19–26	Narbonne

Stade Armandie
Attendance: 7,433

7 April 2007

(1 BP) Clermont	61–24	Bayonne (1 BP)

Stade Marcel-Michelin
Attendance: 12,307

7 April 2007

Perpignan	20–3	Albi

Stade Aimé Giral
Attendance: 12,246

7 April 2007

Biarritz	9–9	Montauban

Parc des Sports Aguiléra
Attendance: 8,889

=== Round 22 ===
13 April 2007

Biarritz	17–7	Agen

Parc des Sports Aguiléra
Attendance: 8,562

14 April 2007

(1 BP) Albi	16–21	Stade Français

Stadium Municipal d'Albi
Attendance: 8,183

14 April 2007

Bayonne	16–8	Narbonne

Stade Jean Dauger
Attendance: 13,379

14 April 2007

Bourgoin	32–19	Castres

Stade Pierre Rajon
Attendance: 5,786

14 April 2007

Montauban	12–29	Perpignan

Stade Sapiac
Attendance: 8,731

14 April 2007

Brive	25–16	Montpellier

Stade Amédée-Domenech
Attendance: 10,526

15 April 2007

Toulouse	24–7	Clermont

Stade Ernest-Wallon
Attendance: 14,003

=== Round 23 ===
27 April 2007

Narbonne	10–41	Toulouse (1 BP)

Parc des Sports Et de l'Amitié
Attendance: 9,756

28 April 2007

Perpignan	15–23	Biarritz

Stade Aimé Giral
Attendance: 13,643

28 April 2007

Agen	16–16	Bayonne

Stade Armandie
Attendance: 9,258

28 April 2007

(1 BP) Clermont	40–9	Bourgoin

Stade Marcel-Michelin
Attendance: 13,517

28 April 2007

Montpellier	23–14	Albi

Stade Sabathé
Attendance: 6,404

28 April 2007

Stade Français	24–17	Montauban (1 BP)

Stade Jean-Bouin
Attendance: 8,999

28 April 2007

Castres	17–15	Brive (1 BP)

Stade Pierre-Fabre
Attendance: 9,108

=== Round 24 ===
4 May 2007

(1 BP) Perpignan	31–18	Agen

Stade Aimé Giral
Attendance: 11,116

5 May 2007

Biarritz	22–13	Stade Français

Parc des Sports Aguiléra
Attendance: 11,704

5 May 2007

Albi	19–12	Castres (1 BP)

Stadium Municipal d'Albi
Attendance: 9,690

5 May 2007

(1 BP) Bourgoin	44–11	Narbonne

Stade Pierre Rajon
Attendance: 6,272

5 May 2007

Montauban	13–12	Montpellier (1 BP)

Stade Sapiac
Attendance: 5,669

5 May 2007

(1 BP) Toulouse	47–28	Bayonne (1 BP)

Stade Ernest-Wallon
Attendance: 18,722

5 May 2007

Brive	28–22	Clermont (1 BP)

Stade Amédée-Domenech
Attendance: 11,704

=== Round 25 ===
11 May 2007

(1 BP) Toulouse	47–0	Agen

Stade Ernest-Wallon
Attendance: 18,768

12 May 2007

Bayonne	18–11	Bourgoin (1 BP)

Stade Jean Dauger
Attendance: 13,926

12 May 2007

Castres	25–13	Montauban

Stade Pierre-Fabre
Attendance: 8,622

12 May 2007

(1 BP) Clermont	70–6	Albi

Stade Marcel-Michelin
Attendance: 13,503

12 May 2007

Narbonne	21–42	Brive (1 BP)

Parc des Sports Et de l'Amitié
Attendance: 9,125

12 May 2007

(1 BP) Montpellier	39–29	Biarritz (1 BP)

Stade Sabathé
Attendance: 6,491

13 May 2007

Stade Français	12–11	Perpignan (1 BP)

Stade de France
Attendance: 69,805

=== Round 26 ===
26 May 2007

(1 BP) Albi	29–0	Narbonne

Stadium Municipal d'Albi
Attendance: 7,101

26 May 2007

Agen	5–18	Stade Français

Stade Armandie
Attendance: 10,224

26 May 2007

(1 BP) Biarritz	32–17	Castres

Parc des Sports Aguiléra
Attendance: 9,097

26 May 2007

(1 BP) Bourgoin	20–21	Toulouse

Stade Pierre Rajon
Attendance: 8,098

26 May 2007

(1 BP) Brive	6–9	Bayonne

Stade Amédée-Domenech
Attendance: 7,899

26 May 2007

(1 BP) Montauban	19–21	Clermont

Stade Sapiac
Attendance: 5,821

26 May 2007

Perpignan	14–9	Montpellier (1 BP)

Stade Aimé Giral
Attendance: 12,250

== Knock-out stages ==
=== Semi-finals ===
1 June 2007

Stade Français	18–6	Biarritz

Stade Chaban-Delmas, Bordeaux
Attendance: 33,303

2 June 2007

Toulouse	15–20	Clermont

Stade Vélodrome, Marseille
Attendance: 55,405

=== Final ===
12 June 2007

Stade Français	23–18	Clermont
Try: Pichot 69'; Samo 78'; Con: Hernández (2/2); Pen: Hernández (3) 50', 53', 64'		Pen: James (5) 19', 34', 43', 60', 74'; Drop: Floch 39'

Stade de France, Saint-Denis
Attendance: 79,654
Referee: Franck Maciello (France)

FB	15	(France) Nicolas Jeanjean
RW	14	(France) Julien Arias
OC	13	(France) Stéphane Glas
IC	12	(France) David Skrela
LW	11	(France) Christophe Dominici
FH	10	(Argentina) Juan Martín Hernández
SH	9	(Argentina) Agustín Pichot (c)
N8	8	(France) Pierre Rabadan
OF	7	(France) Rémy Martin
BF	6	(Italy) Mauro Bergamasco		(substituted off) 46'
RL	5	(Canada) Mike James		(substituted off) 48'
LL	4	(France) Arnaud Marchois		(substituted off) 48'
TP	3	(Argentina) Pedro Ledesma
HK	2	(France) Benjamin Kayser		(substituted off) 57'
LP	1	(Argentina) Rodrigo Roncero
Replacements:
HK	16	(France) Dimitri Szarzewski		(substituted on) 57'
PR	17	(France) Damien Weber
LK	18	(France) David Auradou		(substituted on) 48'
N8	19	(Australia) Radike Samo		(substituted on) 48'
N8	20	(Italy) Sergio Parisse		(substituted on) 46'
SH	21	(France) Jérôme Fillol
CE	22	(France) Brian Liebenberg	(substituted on) 49'
Coach:
(France) Fabien Galthié

FB	15	(France) Anthony Floch
RW	14	(France) Aurélien Rougerie (c)
OC	13	(France) Tony Marsh
IC	12	(Italy) Gonzalo Canale
LW	11	(France) Julien Malzieu
FH	10	(Australia) Brock James
SH	9	(France) Pierre Mignoni
N8	8	(France) Elvis Vermeulen
OF	7	(France) Alexandre Audebert
BF	6	(New Zealand) Sam Broomhall
RL	5	(France) Thibaut Privat	(substituted off) 49'
LL	4	(Canada) Jamie Cudmore	(substituted off) 46'
TP	3	(Argentina) Martín Scelzo	(substituted off) 50'
HK	2	(Argentina) Mario Ledesma
LP	1	(France) Laurent Emmanuelli
Replacements:
PR	16	(Georgia (country)) Davit Zirakashvili	(substituted on) 50'
HK	17	(France) Brice Miguel
LK	18	(France) Loïc Jacquet	(substituted on) 46'
LK	19	(Argentina) Gonzalo Longo	(substituted on) 49'
SH	20	(Italy) Alessandro Troncon
FH	21	(Fiji) Seremaia Bai
CE	22	(South Africa) Grant Esterhuizen
Coach:
(New Zealand) Vern Cotter

== Leading scorers ==
- Note that points scorers includes tries as well as conversions, penalties and drop goals.

=== Top points scorers ===
Rank	Player	Club	Points
1	(Australia) Brock James	Clermont	377
2	(France) Cédric Rosalen	Narbonne	278
3	(France) Romain Teulet	Castres	271
4	(France) Benjamin Boyet	Bourgoin	253
5	(France) David Skrela	Stade Français	220
6	(France) Dimitri Yachvili	Biarritz	208
7	(France) Sébastien Fauqué	Montauban	198
8	(France) Richard Dourthe	Bayonne	180
9	(France) Jean-Baptiste Élissalde	Toulouse	178
10	(France) Andre Hough	Albi	173

=== Top try scorers ===
Rank	Player	Club	Tries
1	(France) Aurélien Rougerie	Clermont	13
2	(France) Julien Candelon	RC Narbonne	12
3	(France) Cédric Heymans	Toulouse	10
4	(France) Philippe Bidabé	Biarritz	9
4	(France) Julien Malzieu	Clermont	9
4	(Samoa) Laloa Milford	Castres	9
4	(Tonga) Lei Tomiki	RC Narbonne	9
5	(France) Vincent Clerc	Toulouse	8
6	(France) Julien Arias	Stade Français	7
6	(New Zealand) Sam Broomhall	Clermont	7
6	(France) Anthony Floch	Clermont	7

== Attendances ==
- Attendances do not include the semi-finals or final as these are at neutral venues.

Club	Home Games	Total	Average	Highest	Lowest	% Capacity
Agen	13	97,662	7,512	11,293	5,321	58%
Albi	13	88,252	6,789	9,690	5,054	57%
Bayonne	13	146,618	11,278	13,926	7,969	67%
Biarritz	13	121,583	9,353	13,013	6,711	62%
Bourgoin	13	87,177	6,706	16,914	4,553	61%
Brive	13	122,145	9,396	12,747	6,908	63%
Castres	13	90,932	6,995	9,293	5,652	61%
Clermont	13	151,950	11,688	13,685	8,943	72%
Montauban	13	94,007	7,231	9,053	5,669	63%
Montpellier	13	78,442	6,034	6,545	5,449	75%
Narbonne	13	100,154	7,704	9,756	6,236	64%
Perpignan	13	162,576	12,506	13,860	11,116	75%
Stade Français	13	313,015	24,078	79,741	6,698	75%
Toulouse	13	243,100	18,700	33,661	13,557	81%

== See also ==
- 2006–07 Heineken Cup
- 2006–07 Rugby Pro D2 season
