= Harold Nicholls =

New Zealand international rugby union & league player

Personal information
- Full name: Harold Garwood Nicholls
- Born: 19 November 1897 Wellington, New Zealand
- Died: 10 August 1977 (aged 79) Whakatāne, New Zealand

Playing information

Rugby union
- Position: Second five-eighth
Club
Years	Team	Pld	T	G	FG	P
1915–23	Wellington	12
Representative
Years	Team	Pld	T	G	FG	P
1923	New Zealand	1	0	0	0	0

Rugby league
- Position: Centre
Representative
Years	Team	Pld	T	G	FG	P
1919–21	Wellington

Harold Garwood Nicholls (19 November 1897 – 10 August 1977) was a New Zealand rugby football player who represented New Zealand in rugby union. Two of his brothers, Mark and Harry, also represented the All Blacks.

== Playing career ==
Nicholls played for the Petone Rugby Club and was the eldest of three brothers.

He first played for Wellington in 1915 before serving in the military for the rest of World War I. In 1919 he again played rugby union for Wellington before switching codes to rugby league. In rugby league Nicholls also represented Wellington for two seasons.

Nicholls was allowed to switch again in 1922 and played rugby union for Wellington in 1922 and 1923. In 1923 he was selected for the All Blacks against the touring New South Wales side and played in one match.
