= Alex Rokobaro =

Fiji international rugby union player

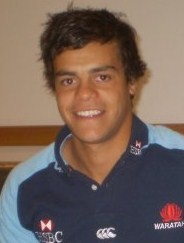
- Born: Alexander Voreque Rokobaro; 6 October 1989 (age 37) Yasawa, Fiji
- Height: 1.83 m (6 ft 0 in)
- Weight: 91 kg (14 st 5 lb)
- School: Marist College Ashgrove

Rugby union career
- Position(s): Utility Back, Fly-half, wing
Senior career
Years	Team	Apps	(Points)
2011–12	Stade Français	10	(32)
2009–14	Sydney Uni Football Club		
2014−15	Calvisano		
2016 -	Old Collegians Rugby Club		
- Correct as of 22 November 2012
Super Rugby
Years	Team	Apps	(Points)
2013–14	Rebels	8	(0)
- Correct as of 8 July 2014
International career
Years	Team	Apps	(Points)
2008	Fiji A	1	(5)
2013	Fiji	2	(0)
- Correct as of 30 November 2013

Alex Rokobaro (born 6 October 1989) is a retired rugby union footballer who represented Fiji at international level in 2013. He played professionally in France and Italy as well as in Super Rugby for the Melbourne Rebels. His usual position was fullback or wing.

== Early career ==
Rokobaro began playing Rugby Union in his hometown of Adelaide, South Australia for Old Collegians. When he was 15 he moved to Brisbane, and attended Marist College Ashgrove and played both Rugby Union and Australian Rules Football.

As fly-half for Fiji at the 2008 Junior World Cup Rokobaro helped Fiji beat Tonga 25 to 10.

After relocating to Sydney, New South Wales, Rokobaro helped Sydney Uni Football Club win the Colts Premiership in 2009.

In 2011–12 he played for French club Stade Français, and scored 32 points in ten appearances.

== Super Rugby ==
Rokobaro was drafted into the NSW Waratahs Academy in 2010. In 2011 he played as an outside back for the Rebels development team.

After his time in France he returned down under to sign with the Melbourne Rebels for the 2013 Super Rugby season. He made his Rebels debut in February 2013, against the Brumbies. Eight minutes into the second half, he come on after the injured fullback James O'Connor left the field. Kingi moved to fullback, and Rokobaro took Kingi's place on the right wing.

He played only 2 games in 2014 and bowed out of super rugby in the final round game against the Bulls.

== International career ==
In October 2013, he was named in the Fiji team for the 2013 end-of-year rugby union tests and he made his debut off the bench against Portugal.

== Post-playing career ==
Since retiring from rugby, Rokobaro returned to Adelaide and currently works as a Performance Camps Manager for Athlete | IQ.
