= Old Collegians Rugby Club =

Rugby union club in Adelaide, Australia

- Full name: Old Collegians Rugby Union Football Club
- Union: Rugby Union South Australia
- Founded: 1937
- Ground(s): Tregenza Reserve; Laurel Ave, Linden Park SA

Official website
- oldcollegians.rugby

Old Collegians Rugby Club, also known as Old Coll's, is a rugby union club in Adelaide, South Australia. The team was founded in 1937, and plays at Tregenza Reserve. The club's jersey is maroon and blue.

== History ==
Old Collegians first played in 1937 as Prince Alfred Old Collegians Rugby Club.

During World War II, the competition ceased from 1941 and the club was reformed on the renewal of the competition in the state in 1945. The club was then named Old Collegians Rugby Club.

OC's first home ground was in the centre of Victoria Park racecourse; the club later moved to the dairy cow-grazed pastures of the south parklands and in 1953 moved again to its current location at Tregenza Oval.

In the early 1980s the club ran an U/18 team for three years and then formed the Junior Collegians in 1985. OC now competes in each junior age bracket.

OC is one of the two founding clubs (the other being Adelaide University) of the women's South Australian rugby competition and the only club to compete continuously from the first games in 1995 until 2018.

Many OC players have captained or represented the state at senior and junior levels over the years and have taken out SARU individual player awards. The greatest achievement so far has gone to Rod Hauser, who was selected for the Wallabies while playing for OC.

The Club Guernsey has changed colours from the initial maroon and blue jumper with a PAC crest, to broad maroon and navy hoops in 1955, to light red and blue hoops in the mid-1970s, before returning to their traditional maroon and royal blue in 2025.

== Controversy ==
Following a women's state premiership victory in 2018, 20 female players left the club for Adelaide University after allegations of mistreatment and misogyny were left unaddressed by the Old Collegians club committee. Additionally, a sexual harassment claim was made by a female player against a male coach which was investigated by the club.

In early 2020, the club was awarded a $500,000 grant from a governmental sport infrastructure fund, as part of the "sports rorts" affair, for new facilities including female changing rooms despite the club not having fielded a female team since 2018. The club stated its intention was to reinstate a women's team for the 2020 season, but at the time the grant was awarded, no team had yet been registered.

== Notable past players ==
Brock James represented Australia as an under 16, 19 and 21. He played for both the Queensland Reds and the Western Force in Super Rugby before going on to be the top points scorer in the Top 14 in France with Clermont Auvergne, appearing in numerous grand finals and the Heineken Cup.

Liam Gill (rugby) played for the Queensland Reds, RC Toulonnais, Australia national rugby union team, the Australia national rugby sevens team and currently Lyon OU in the Top 14.

Alex Rokobaro is a former professional rugby player who played for the Fijian national rugby team, the Stade Français Paris, the Melbourne Rebels and Rugby Calvisano.
