= Arthur Thomas (New Zealand cricketer) =

New Zealand cricketer

Personal information
- Full name: Arthur Ward Thomas
- Born: 25 January 1881; Christchurch, New Zealand
- Died: 7 May 1965 (aged 84); Christchurch, New Zealand
- Batting: Right-handed
- Bowling: Right-arm medium-pace

Domestic team information
- Years: Team
- 1911–12 to 1922–23: Canterbury

Career statistics
Competition	First-class
Matches	19
Runs scored	801
Batting average	28.60
100s/50s	0/6
Top score	83 not out
Balls bowled	2256
Wickets	35
Bowling average	26.62
5 wickets in innings	1
10 wickets in match	0
Best bowling	8/99
Catches/stumpings	11/–
- Source: Cricinfo, 26 November 2018

Arthur Ward Thomas (25 January 1881 – 7 May 1965) was a New Zealand cricketer who played first-class cricket for Canterbury from 1911 to 1922.

== Cricket career ==
Thomas was an all-rounder: a lower-order or middle-order batsman who bowled medium-pace. He was the outstanding player of the Plunket Shield match in January 1915 when Canterbury beat Auckland in Auckland. Replacing the injured Duncan McLachlan in the team, he did not bowl in Auckland's first innings, then made 41 at number nine to take Canterbury's first innings from 124 for 7 to 208 all out. He then took the first seven wickets in Auckland's second innings and finished with figures of 8 for 99, the best figures recorded for the Plunket Shield at that time. He then contributed 20 at number eight to Canterbury’s one-wicket victory.

Thomas made his highest score in Canterbury's victory over Wellington in the 1919–20 Plunket Shield. After dismissing Wellington for 239, Canterbury were 160 for 6 when Thomas went to the wicket. He made 83 not out, the highest score of the match, and took Canterbury's total to 350. He then took 3 for 25 as Wellington made only 153 in their second innings, and Canterbury went on to win by seven wickets.

Thomas was still playing successfully in Christchurch senior cricket in the 1930–31 season. He was a long-time coach at Christchurch Boys' High School. In the 1930s, he served as coach to the Canterbury Cricket Association.

== Personal life ==
Thomas was a farmer. On 29 April 1903 he married Esther Boulton at her parents' home in Charing Cross, a small farming settlement west of Christchurch. They had three sons and two daughters. She died in January 1945. He died in May 1965.
