= Tom Katene =

New Zealand rugby union player

- Full name: Thomas Katene
- Born: 14 August 1929 Okaiawa, New Zealand
- Died: 6 June 1992 (aged 62) Auckland, New Zealand
- Height: 1.75 m (5 ft 9 in)
- Weight: 89 kg (196 lb)

Rugby union career
- Position: Wing
International career
| Years | Team | Apps | (Points) |
| 1955 | New Zealand | 1 | (0) |

Thomas Katene (14 August 1929 – 6 June 1992) was a New Zealand rugby union international.

Born in Okaiawa, Taranaki, Katene was educated at Matapu School.

Katene was a strongly built wing three-quarter and played his early representative rugby for King Country. He joined Petone in 1955 and formed a successful wing partnership in the Wellington team with Ron Jarden. Capped once for the All Blacks, Katene played the 2nd Test of the 1955 Bledisloe Cup series against the Wallabies at Carisbrook. He also played representative rugby for New Zealand Māori and North Island during his career.

In 1989, Katene was found guilty on 25 false pretence charges and received an 18-month jail sentence.

== See also ==
- List of New Zealand national rugby union players
