= Barossa Rams RUFC =

South Australian rugby union club

Barossa Rams
- Union: Rugby Union South Australia
- Founded: 1977 (Roseworthy College RC); 2006 (Barossa Rams)
- Location: Tanunda, South Australia
- Ground(s): Menge Road, Tanunda 5352
Team kit

The Barossa Rams Rugby Club is a South Australian rugby union club from the Barossa Valley wine region and based in the town of Tanunda, 58 km northeast of Adelaide.

As of 2024, the club fields three men's teams, a women's team and junior teams age-graded from under-7 through to under-16 The Rams home ground is Barossa Rugby Precinct located in Tanunda. Previously located at Lyndoch Oval The relocation "Is in response to pressure on infrastructure and scheduling at Lyndoch Oval, resulting from population growth in Southern Barossa and Unprecedented growth and demand."

The club's jersey is black and pink.

== History ==
The team was founded in 1977 as the Roseworthy College Rugby Club. The college subsequently became part of University of Adelaide in 1991 and, when the funding for rugby was withdrawn by the college in 2006, the club relocated to Lyndoch and became the Barossa Rams. In 2013 the Rams were promoted to Premier Grade in the South Australian Rugby competition.
