= Thomas McArthur =

Thomas McArthur or MacArthur may refer to:

- Tom MacArthur (born 1960), American businessman and politician
- Tom McArthur (umpire) (1937–2018), Australian rules football umpire in Queensland
- Tom McArthur (linguist), editor of English Today

== See also ==
- Thomas Arthur (disambiguation)
