= Brock James =

Australian rugby union player (born 1981)

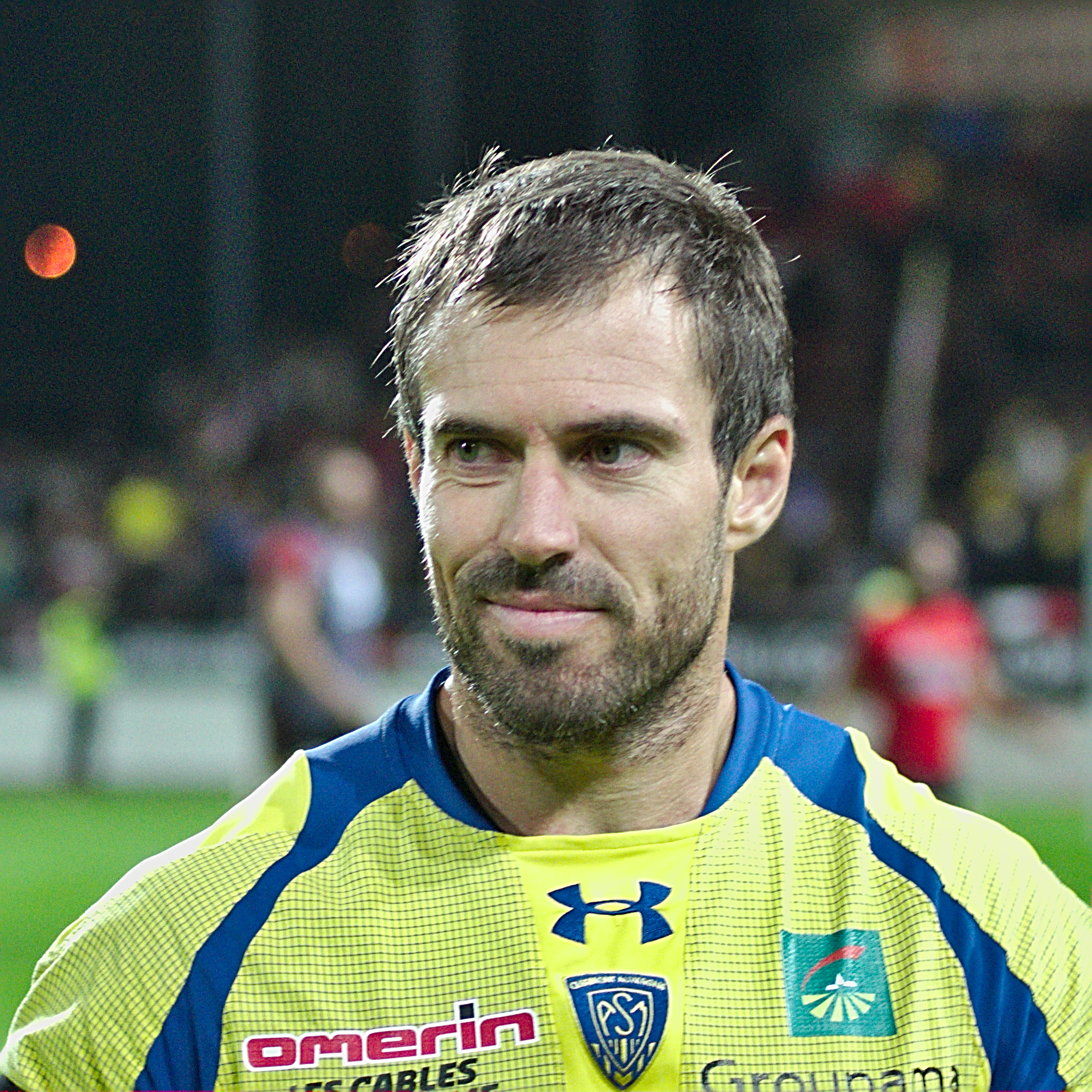
- Born: 22 October 1981 (age 45) Victoria, Australia
- Height: 179 cm (5 ft 10 in)
- Weight: 82 kg (12 st 13 lb; 181 lb)
- School: The Scots College
- University: Sydney University

Rugby union career
- Position: Fly-half
Amateur team(s)
Years	Team	Apps	(Points)
2001–2004	Sydney University		
2005–2006	Nedlands		
Senior career
Years	Team	Apps	(Points)
2004	Taranaki	8	(93)
2006–2016	Clermont Auvergne	289	(2,483)
2016–2018	La Rochelle	51	(392)
2018–2019	Bordeaux Bègles	23	(75)
2019–2020	La Rochelle	6	(29)
- Correct as of 1 November 2019
Super Rugby
Years	Team	Apps	(Points)
2005	Reds	3	(0)
2006	Western Force	10	(7)
International career
Years	Team	Apps	(Points)
2000	Australia U19		
2002	Australia U21		
National sevens team
Years	Team		Comps
2002	Australia 7s		

Brock James (born 22 October 1981 in Victoria, Australia) is an Australian rugby union coach and former player who is the coach of Hawke's Bay in New Zealand's National Provincial Championship.

== Career ==
James learnt to play rugby at Old Collegians in South Australia under the guidance of backs coach, Jo Suttell. He represented South Australia at U12, U14 and U16s and first represented Australia in 1997 as an Under 16.

James then moved to attend The Scots College in Sydney and Sydney University, where he was a resident of St. John's College. After a few good seasons in the southern hemisphere, he joined Clermont-Ferrand after Stephen Jones's departure. For his first season, he played every single game with Clermont and became top scorer of the league with 380 points. From 4 January till 28 March 2009, he scored 41 placed kicks in a row, a new record for the Top 14, the old one being Romain Teulet's 35 kicks in a row in 2004–05, and just 3 short of the World Record held by Neil Jenkins. He played in the final as Clermont won the Top 14 title in 2009–10.

James has earned caps for Australia U-21 and Australia national sevens team in 2002.

James was ranked #50 in the list 'The 50 best rugby players in the world 2009' by the British newspaper 'The Independent'.

On 1 January 2016, James made the switch for Top 14 rivals La Rochelle from the 2016–17 season.

=== Coaching ===
On 26 June 2020 James joined the Ospreys as attack coach under new boss Toby Booth then moved to New Zealand in 2022 to coach Hawke's Bay.

== Honours ==
Clermont

- European Challenge Cup winners: (2006–07)
- Top 14 champions: (2009–10)

International

- Under 21 Australian selection
- Under 19 Australian selection (World Cup)
- Under 16 Australian selection (a particularly notable achievement as he was playing outside of the traditional rugby states, for Old Collegians in South Australia at the time, where his father Jesse James was also a coach. Ben Suttell was Head Coach and inspired Brock to change positions from half-back to five-eighth)

Personal

- Top 14 top points scorer (3): (2006–07, 2007–08, 2008–09)
