= William Hardham =

New Zealand soldier (1876–1928)

William Hardham VC
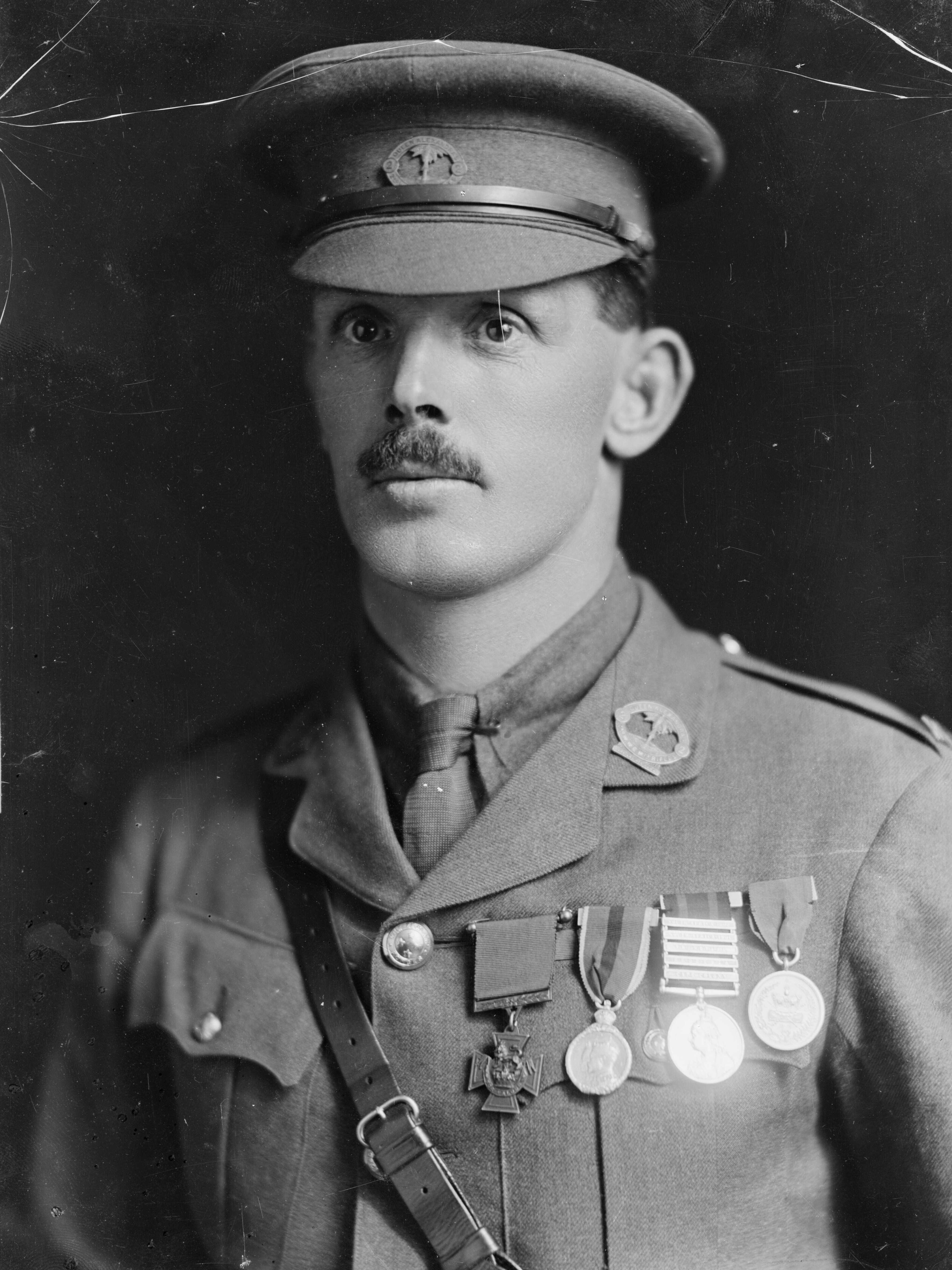
- Hardham in 1916
- Born: 31 July 1876; Wellington, New Zealand
- Died: 13 April 1928 (aged 51); Wellington, New Zealand
- Burial place: Karori Soldier's Cemetery, Wellington
- Military career
- Allegiance: New Zealand
- Branch: New Zealand Military Forces
- Service years: 1895–1920
- Rank: Major
- Units: 4th New Zealand Contingent; Wellington Mounted Rifles Regiment
- Conflicts: Second Boer War; First World War; Gallipoli campaign; Sinai and Palestine campaign
- Awards: Victoria Cross
- Other work: Rugby union player and administrator

William James Hardham (31 July 1876 – 13 April 1928) was a New Zealand soldier who was a recipient of the Victoria Cross, the highest award for gallantry "in the face of the enemy" that could be awarded at the time to military personnel of the British Empire.

Born in Wellington, Hardham was a blacksmith and part-time soldier in the local militia when he volunteered to serve with the New Zealand Military Forces in the Second Boer War. Posted to the 4th Contingent in 1900, he was on a patrol in the South African Transvaal when it was ambushed. He rode his horse to the rescue of a wounded soldier while under heavy fire and for this he was awarded the Victoria Cross. Discharged from the New Zealand Military Forces in 1901, he rejoined for another period of service in the Second Boer War but was only briefly in South Africa before being sent to England for the coronation of King Edward VII and Queen Alexandra.

Returning to civilian life, he became increasingly involved in rugby administration with the Wellington Rugby Football Union; he had played representative rugby for Wellington in his youth. He also continued to serve in the militia. When the First World War began, he volunteered for service abroad with the New Zealand Expeditionary Force (NZEF) and was posted to the Wellington Mounted Rifles Regiment (WMR) as a captain. Wounded during the Gallipoli Campaign, he was repatriated to New Zealand. On recovery he was made commandant of Queen Mary Hospital in Hanmer Springs but desired a return to the NZEF and a posting overseas. He rejoined the WMR, then in Palestine, in late 1917 but his health was poor and affected the remainder of his service in the military. Having reached the rank of major by the end of the war in 1918, he was subsequently discharged from the NZEF. Returning to civilian life, he worked for a newspaper and later the Public Works Department as well as being involved in veterans' affairs. He died in 1928 at the age of 51.

== Early life ==
William James Hardham was born on 31 July 1876 in Wellington to George Hardham, a labourer, and his wife, Ann Hardham, née Gregory. He received his education at Mount Cook School. When his schooling was completed, he obtained work as a blacksmith. A keen sportsman, he played rugby for the Petone Rugby Club and also represented Wellington in provincial rugby. He would eventually play 53 games for Wellington. His military career began in 1895, when he joined the Wellington Naval Artillery, a part-time militia unit, serving with the Petone Company.

== South Africa ==
The Second Boer War arose from tensions between the Boer South African Republic and the British authorities in the Transvaal of South Africa over control of the region. In September 1899, just prior to the commencement of hostilities, New Zealand's Parliament offered the British Government a mounted rifles contingent from the New Zealand Military Forces for service in South Africa, which was accepted. Volunteers were plentiful and two contingents had already left for the war by 1900.

Hardham was among those who volunteered and he was posted to the 4th New Zealand Contingent as a farrier sergeant major. Landing in Portuguese East Africa in April 1900, the Fourth Contingent, nicknamed the "Rough Riders", were deployed as part of the Rhodesian Field Force around Mafeking. Aside from a brief action at Ottoshoop in August, the Rough Riders spent the majority of their war service in the Transvaal, carrying out reconnaissance patrols and pursuing Boer commandos. As part of the effort to deprive the Boers of resources, they also helped to destroy crops and round up civilians and cattle, during which they occasionally skirmished with armed commandos. On 28 January 1901, Hardham was on a patrol near Naauwpoort, in the Transvaal, when it was ambushed by twenty Boers. Although the patrol was able to withdraw, one man was wounded and his horse was shot from under him. Seeing this, Hardham rode to his aid and extracted him to safety while under heavy gunfire.

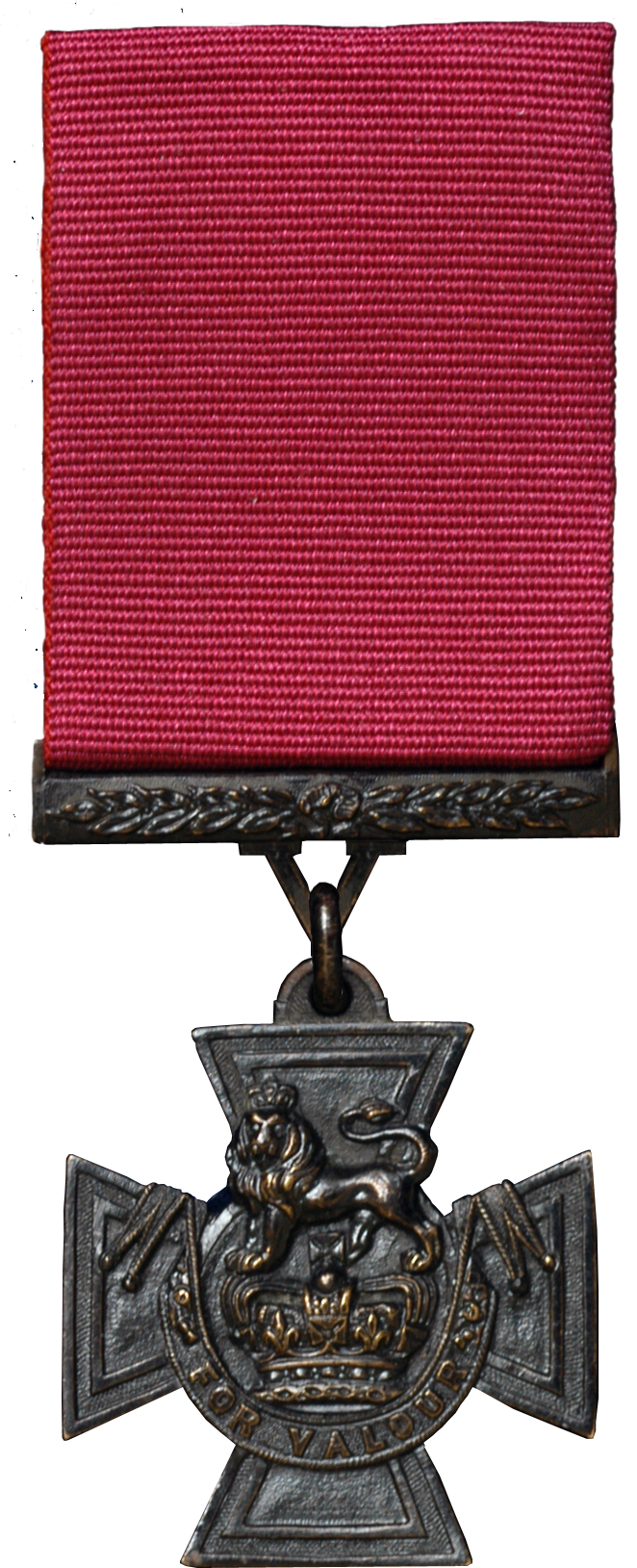
The Victoria Cross

For his actions, Hardham was recommended for the Victoria Cross (VC) by General Lord Kitchener, commander of British forces in South Africa. The VC, instituted in 1856, was the highest award for valour that could be bestowed on a military personnel of the British Empire. The local commander, Major-General Ian Hamilton, believed the Distinguished Conduct Medal, second only to the VC, was a more appropriate form of recognition for Hardham. However, the commander-in-chief of the British Army, Field Marshal Earl Roberts, concurred with Kitchener and the VC nomination was approved. The citation for Hardham's VC, the first to be awarded to a New Zealander of a unit of the New Zealand Military Forces serving overseas, read:

On 28 January 1901, near Naauwpoort, this Non-Commissioned Officer was with a section which was extended and hotly engaged with a party of about 20 Boers. Just before the force commenced to retire Trooper McCrae was wounded and his horse killed. Farrier-Major Hardham at once went under a heavy fire to his assistance, dismounted and placed him on his own horse, and ran alongside until he had guided him to a place of safety.

— The London Gazette, No. 27362, 4 October 1901

Hardham was presented with the VC, the only such award made to a New Zealander in the Boer War, on 1 July 1901 by George, Prince of Wales, who was in South Africa on a visit. This event took place even before the award was officially announced in The London Gazette. At the time of the presentation of the VC, the back of the suspender bar and reverse face of the medal itself was not engraved with his name, rank, unit and date of the action that resulted in the award, in a departure from normal practice; Hardham presumably arranged the engraving himself later. The Rough Riders spent the final weeks of their service in South Africa in operations to the north of Klerksdorp, patrolling and denying the Boer commandos food. They were also involved in the capture of a convoy of Koos de la Rey's commando in March 1901. The contingent left for New Zealand in June 1901 and Hardham was discharged two months later.

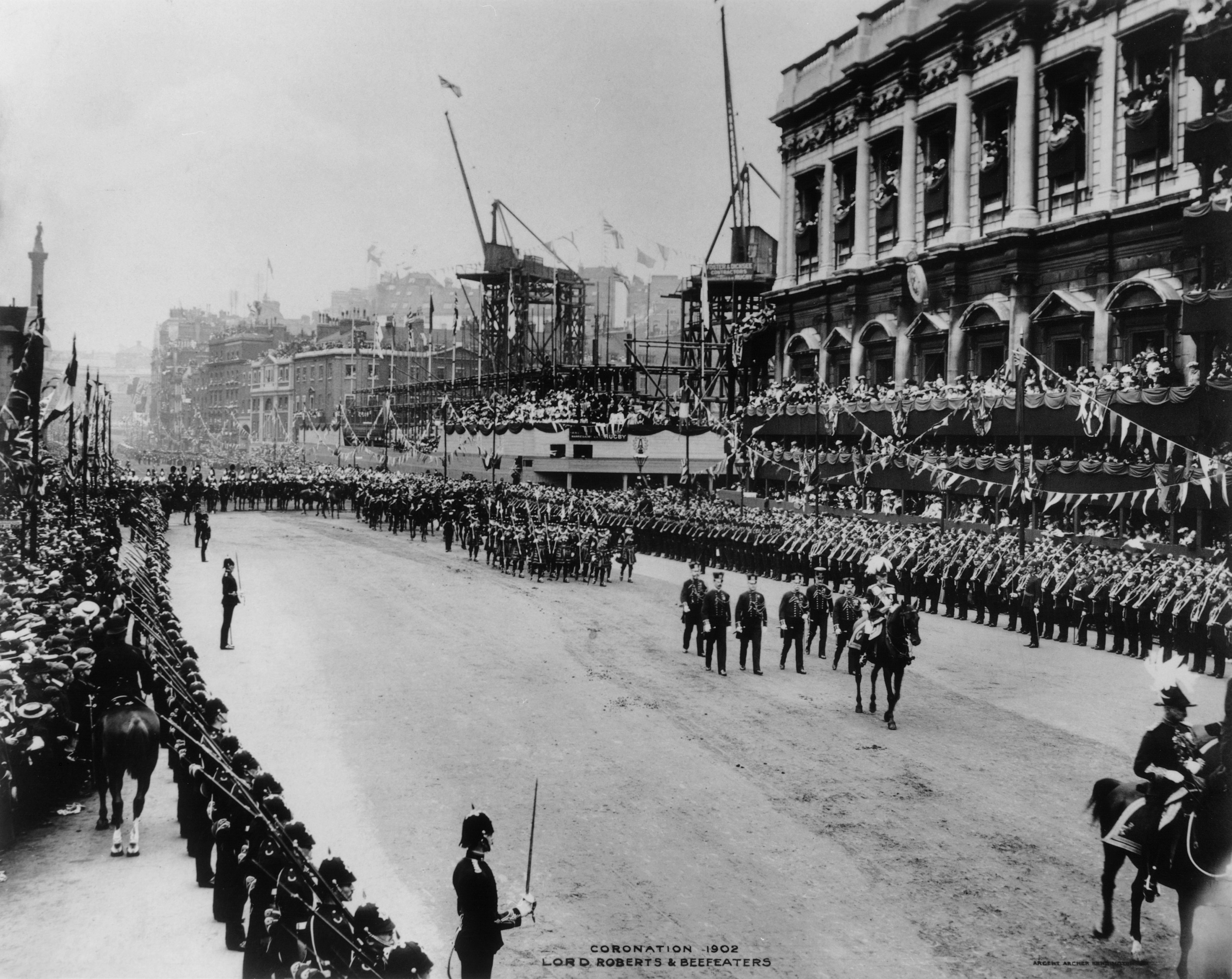
Part of the parade for the coronation of King Edward VII in London

He volunteered to serve again in South Africa, this time with the Ninth Contingent and was commissioned as a lieutenant in February 1902. Soon after the Ninth Contingent's arrival in South Africa in late April, Hardham and over 50 other New Zealand mounted riflemen, serving in South Africa, were sent to England to join up with the official New Zealand party attending the coronation of King Edward VII and Queen Alexandra and participated in a parade of colonial troops in London on 1 July 1902.

== Civilian life ==
Hardham returned to civilian life after his visit to London and continued to serve with the Naval Artillery. In 1910, having attained the rank of sergeant and served as a volunteer in the militia for 16 years, he was awarded the Long and Efficient Service Medal. In addition to his work as a blacksmith, he also increasingly became involved in rugby administration; in 1908 he commenced a six-year term on the committee of the Wellington Rugby Football Union.

== First World War ==
On the outbreak of the First World War in 1914, Hardham volunteered for the New Zealand Expeditionary Force (NZEF), being raised for service overseas. Appointed as a captain in the Wellington Mounted Rifles Regiment (WMR), he was second in command of its 2nd Squadron. Travelling on the troopship Arawa, he embarked with the main body of the NZEF for the Middle East in October 1914. His regiment was part of the New Zealand Mounted Rifles Brigade and was destined for service in the Gallipoli campaign. Arriving in Egypt, the WMR spent several months in training and during this time Hardham helped to organise sporting events to keep the men occupied.

=== Gallipoli ===
While the WMR was not involved in the initial landings on 25 April 1915 at Gallipoli, it arrived on the peninsula a few weeks later on 12 May, without their horses. Within days, the WMR was involved in the fighting. During the Turkish assault on Anzac Cove on 19 May, the WMR helped fend off attacks at Quinn's Post. Later in the day, Hardham was ordered to lead an attacking party on the stretch of ridge named the Nek, from where Turkish soldiers were sniping. The area over which the party was to advance was swept with Turkish machine-gun fire and the orders to attack were cancelled. Soon afterwards, he participated in the Battle for No.3 Post, an effort to capture a Turkish outpost. Seized by the Canterbury Mounted Rifles on 28 May, a squadron of the WMR immediately took over the position but were attacked in the evening and cut off for over 24 hours. Involved in the efforts to relieve the beleaguered squadron, Hardham received serious wounds; another officer who came to his aid was also wounded. The trapped WMR soldiers were relieved on 30 May and the position, too exposed to further attacks from the Turks, was abandoned.

=== Later war service ===
Although treated for his injuries, which were to his hand and chest, Hardham was repatriated to New Zealand in February 1916. Soon after his return, on 16 March, he married Constance Evelyn née Parsonson at St. Peter's Church in Wellington. His brother was the best man for the ceremony. He agitated for a return to active duty with the NZEF but instead received an appointment as commandant of Queen Mary Hospital in Hanmer Springs. Initially a temporary position, he did so well in the post that it was made permanent and he was promoted to major.

Hardham still sought a role with the NZEF and in late 1917 the military authorities relented, and he was able to rejoin the WMR, which was serving in the campaign in Palestine. His health was poor and he was ill for much of the remainder of the war. He was ultimately repatriated back to New Zealand suffering from malaria.

== Later life and legacy ==
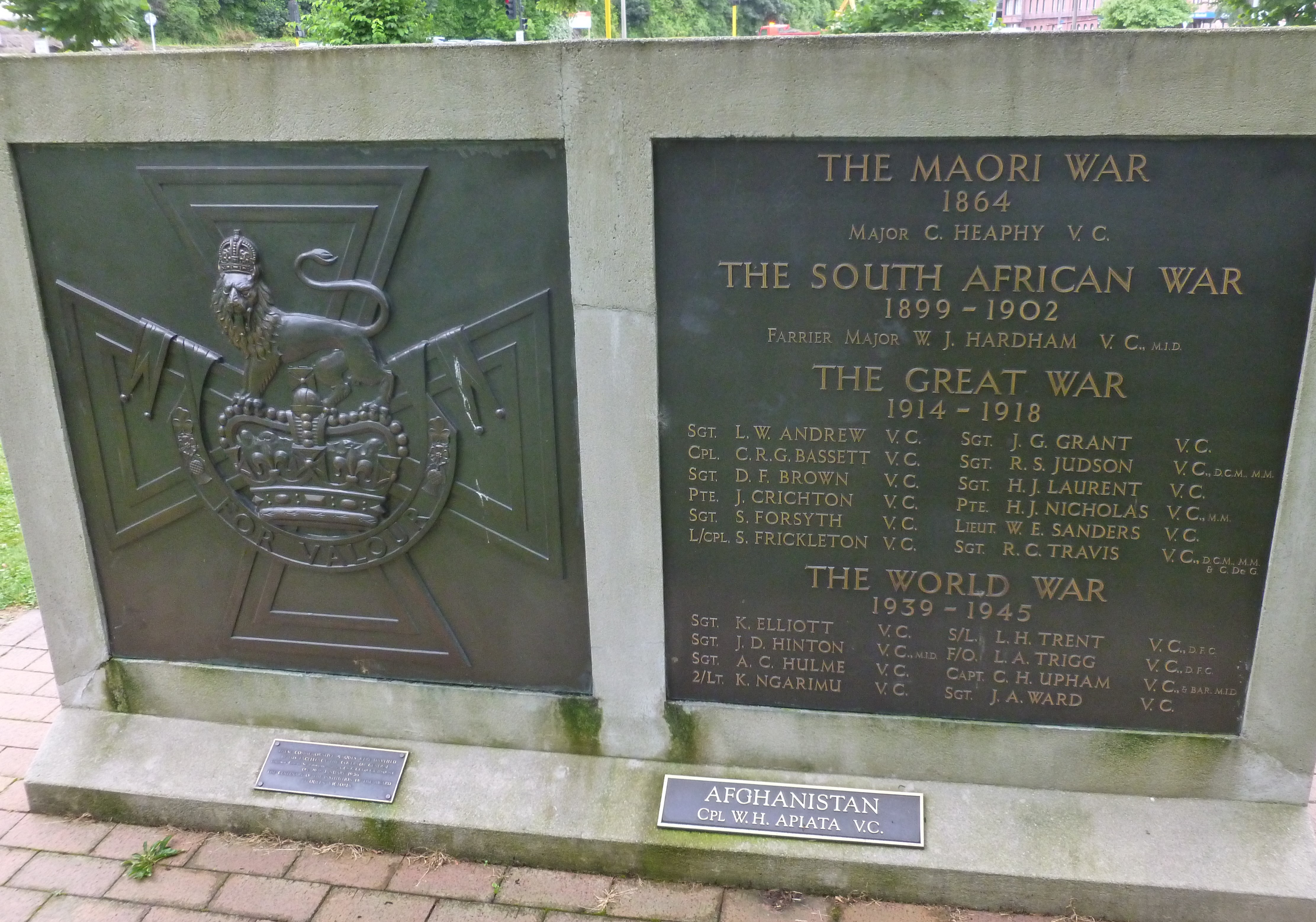
Memorial plaque in Queen's Gardens, Dunedin

After the war, Hardham sought a role in the New Zealand Military Forces as a professional soldier. His application was declined on account of his health and he was duly discharged from the NZEF in March 1920. Unable to return to his work as a blacksmith because of his poor physical condition, he found employment at The Dominion, a Wellington-based newspaper, and later with the Public Works Department. He was involved in veterans' affairs, being a club manager at the Wellington Returned Soldiers' Association and organising Anzac Day parades.

Hardham was still involved with rugby administration, serving again on the committee of the Wellington Rugby Football Union from 1921 to 1925. He was eventually made a life member. As a schoolboy, the future rugby commentator Winston McCarthy met Hardham, later describing him as "a very silent, simple man" who gave him a historic book on rugby.

Suffering from stomach cancer, Hardham died at his home in the suburb of Ngaio on 13 April 1928, at the age of 51. He received a military funeral which the prime minister of New Zealand, Gordon Coates, attended, and was buried at Karori Cemetery in Wellington. His VC is displayed at the National Army Museum at Waiouru. The Hardham Cup, a competition trophy in Wellington club rugby, is named in his honour and he is also remembered by a plaque in Queen's Gardens in Dunedin.
