= Thomas Arthur =

Thomas or Tom Arthur may refer to:

- Thomas Arthur (bishop) (died 1486), Roman Catholic bishop of Limerick
- Thomas Arthur (physician) (1593–c. 1666), Irish Roman Catholic physician
- Thomas Arthur (VC) (1835–1902), recipient of the Victoria Cross
- Thomas Arthur (dramatist) (died 1532), English divine and dramatist
- Thomas Arthur, comte de Lally (1702–1766), French soldier
- Thomas Arthur (Iowa judge) (1860–1925), justice of the Iowa Supreme Court
- Thomas Arthur (tailor), Scottish tailor who worked for James V of Scotland
- Thomas Arthur (Virginia politician) (1749-1833), Virginia planter, politician and military officer who moved to Kentucky
- Thomas Arthur (MP), in 1397, MP for Somerset
- Tom Arthur (rugby union) (1906–1986), Welsh international rugby union player
- Tom Arthur (Australian politician) (1883–1953)
- Tom Arthur (Scottish politician) (born 1985), member of Scottish Parliament

== See also ==
- Thomas McArthur (disambiguation)
- Arthur Thomas (disambiguation)
