= Arthur Thomas (rugby union) =

- Full name: Leslie Arthur Thomas
- Born: 13 August 1897 Kaiapoi, New Zealand
- Died: 3 June 1971 (aged 73) Lower Hutt, New Zealand
- Height: 180 cm (5 ft 11 in)
- Weight: 82 kg (181 lb)

Rugby union career
- Position: Loose forward
Provincial / State sides
Years	Team	Apps	(Points)
- Wellington
- Hawke's Bay
International career
Years	Team	Apps	(Points)
1925	New Zealand		

Leslie Arthur Thomas (13 August 1897 – 3 June 1971) was a New Zealand international rugby union player.

Thomas hailed from Canterbury and played his rugby for Wellington club Petone.

A loose forward, Thomas made his representative debut for Wellington in 1917 and continued to represent the province through the 1920s, aside from a brief stint with Hawke's Bay when he was staying in Napier. In 1925, Thomas represented the All Blacks on their tour of New South Wales, appearing in three uncapped matches. He played for the North Island in 1926 and also featured for a combined Manwatu-Wellington XV during his career.

Thomas served as a selector for the Poverty Bay union.

== See also ==
- List of New Zealand national rugby union players
