= Arthur Thomas (Glamorgan cricketer) =

Welsh cricketer

Personal information
- Full name: Arthur Emlyn Thomas
- Born: 7 May 1895; Briton Ferry, Glamorgan, Wales
- Died: 11 February 1953 (aged 57); Briton Ferry, Glamorgan, Wales
- Batting: Right-handed

Domestic team information
- Years: Team
- 1913 & 1925: Glamorgan

Career statistics
Competition	First-class
Matches	1
Runs scored	15
Batting average	7.50
100s/50s	–/–
Top score	11
Catches/stumpings	–/–
- Source: Cricinfo, 3 July 2010

Arthur Emlyn Thomas (7 May 1895 – 11 February 1953) was a Welsh cricketer, born in Briton Ferry, Glam.

Thomas was a right-handed batsman. He made his debut for Glamorgan in the 1913 Minor Counties Championship against the Surrey Second XI, in what was his only Minor Counties appearance for the county.

By 1925, Glamorgan was a first-class county. Thomas made his only first-class appearance for Glamorgan in the 1925 County Championship against Northamptonshire at St. Helen's, Swansea. In this match he scored 15 runs, leaving him with a batting average of 7.50 and a top score of 11.

Thomas died in the town of his birth on 11 February 1953.
