= 1974 Japan rugby union tour of New Zealand =

Summary
P	W	D	L
Total
10	5	1	4
Test match
3	1	0	2
Opponent
P	W	D	L
(New Zealand) NZ Universities
2	1	0	1
(New Zealand) Junior All Blacks
1	0	0	1

The 1974 Japan rugby union tour of New Zealand was a series of 10 matches played in April and May 1974 in New Zealand by the Japan national rugby union team. It was the first visit of a Japanese team in New Zealand. They did not play against the All Blacks, but two matches against the New Zealand Universities team and the Junior All Blacks, which was at that time an Under-23 selection. These three matches were recognized as test matches by the Japanese Rugby Union team.

== Results ==
25 April 1974

Counties Manukau	23 - 42	Japan XV

Pukekohe

28 April 1974

Auckland Waikato Univ. Combined	6 - 43	Japan XV

Hamilton

1 May 1974

Taranaki	15 - 19	Japan XV

New Plymouth

4 May 1974

Poverty Bay	13 - 13	Japan XV

Gisborne

7 May 1974

Canterbury Uni / Lincoln College	70 - 23	Japan XV

Lancaster Park, Christchurch

9 May 1974

South Canterbury	18 - 23	Japan XV

Timaru

12 May 1974

New Zealand Universities	40 - 31	Japan

Carisbrook, Dunedin

15 May 1974

Southland	39 - 20	Japan XV

Invercargill

19 May 1974

Junior All Blacks	55 - 31	Japan

Eden Park, Auckland

26 May 1974

New Zealand Universities	21 - 24	Japan

Athletic Park, Wellington
