= Arnaud Marchois =

French rugby union player

- Born: Arnaud Marchois; 24 June 1983 (age 43) Châtenay-Malabry, France
- Height: 2.00 m (6 ft 6 1/2 in)
- Weight: 118 kg (18 st 8 lb)

Rugby union career
- Position: Lock
Senior career
Years	Team	Apps	(Points)
2001–2011	Stade Français	186	(0)
2011–	Lyon OU	4	(0)

Arnaud Marchois (born 24 June 1983) is a French rugby union footballer, currently playing for Lyon OU in the Top 14. His usual position is at Lock. Prior to joining Lyon OU he played for Stade Français where he won the Top 14 in 2003, 2004 and 2007.

== Honours ==
- Top 14, 2003, 2004 and 2007 with Stade Français
