= Duncan McLachlan (cricketer) =

New Zealand cricketer

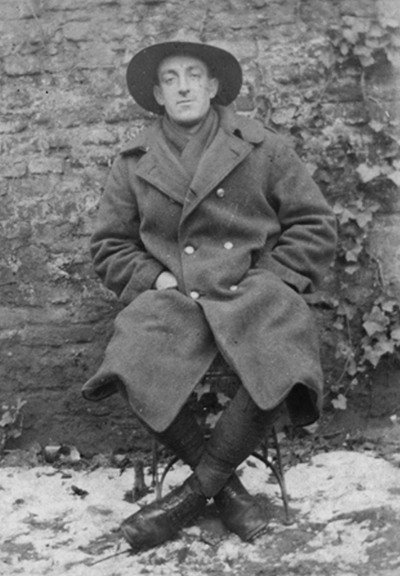
- McLachlan in Mülheim, Cologne, 1918/19

Personal information
- Full name: Duncan Bell McLachlan
- Born: 30 October 1893; Dunedin, Otago, New Zealand
- Died: 15 September 1958 (aged 64); Chatswood, New South Wales, Australia
- Bowling: Left-arm medium

Domestic team information
- Years: Team
- 1912/13: Otago
- 1914/15–1921/22: Canterbury

Career statistics
Competition	First-class
Matches	5
Runs scored	13
Batting average	1.62
100s/50s	0/0
Top score	10
Balls bowled	820
Wickets	30
Bowling average	12.90
5 wickets in innings	3
10 wickets in match	2
Best bowling	7/57
Catches/stumpings	1/–
- Source: ESPNcricinfo, 25 March 2022

Duncan Bell McLachlan (30 October 1893 – 15 September 1958) was a New Zealand cricketer. He played five matches of first-class cricket for Canterbury and Otago between the 1912–13 and 1921–22 seasons.

A left-arm medium-pace bowler, McLachlan took 22 wickets in seven days in two first-class matches on Canterbury's northern tour in January 1915. On 6 and 7 January, against Hawke's Bay in Hastings, he took 7 for 57 and 5 for 17 in Canterbury's innings victory. On 9, 11 and 12 January he took 4 for 59 and 6 for 43 against Wellington at the Basin Reserve, Wellington; Canterbury won by 92 runs.

McLachlan served overseas with the New Zealand Expeditionary Force in World War I. He was part of the New Zealand occupation of Cologne in Germany immediately after the end of the war.

Professionally McLachlan worked as a piano tuner. He died at Chatswood in Sydney in 1958 aged 64.
