= Arthur Thomas (Cambridge University cricketer) =

English cricketer and clergyman

Personal information
- Full name: Arthur Thomas
- Born: 14 February 1816; London, England
- Died: 1 December 1895 (aged 79); Malvern, Worcestershire, England
- Batting: Unknown

Domestic team information
- Years: Team
- 1837–1838: Cambridge University

Career statistics
| Competition | First-class |
|---|---|
| Matches | 4 |
| Runs scored | 31 |
| Batting average | 6.20 |
| 100s/50s | –/– |
| Top score | 18 |
| Catches/stumpings | 1/– |
- Source: Cricinfo, 26 January 2023

Arthur Thomas (14 February 1816 – 1 December 1895) was an English clergyman and a cricketer who played in four first-class cricket matches for Cambridge University in 1837 and 1838. He was born in London and died at Great Malvern, Worcestershire.

Thomas was educated at Winchester College and at Trinity College, Cambridge. As a cricketer, he was a batsman, sometimes used as an opener, and there is no evidence that he bowled in first-class cricket, though the full details of the matches in which he played have not survived. It is not known whether he batted right- or left-handed. He played in two matches in each of the 1837 and 1838 seasons that have since been designated as first-class; his final game was the 1838 University Match against Oxford University, in which he scored 6 and 3 not out.

Thomas graduated from Cambridge University in 1839 with a Bachelor of Arts degree which automatically converted to a Master of Arts in 1842. He was ordained as a Church of England deacon in 1840 and as a priest the following year. He was successively a curate at Eastergate, West Sussex and then Whaddon and Shepreth in Cambridgeshire before becoming priest-in-charge at Milford, Surrey, from 1846. In 1848, he became vicar at Rottingdean, East Sussex and remained there for the rest of his life.
