= 2006–07 European Challenge Cup =

Tournament details
- Countries: England; France; Ireland; Italy; Romania; Scotland
- Tournament format(s): Round-robin and Knockout
- Date: 20 October 2006 – 19 May 2007

Tournament statistics
- Top point scorer(s): Glen Jackson (Saracens) (111 points)
- Top try scorer(s): Nick Abendanon (Bath); Aled Brew (Newport Gwent Dragons) (7 tries)

Final
- Champions: (France) Clermont Auvergne (2nd title)
- Runners-up: (England) Bath

The 2006–07 European Challenge Cup was the 11th year of the European Challenge Cup, the second tier rugby union cup competition below the Heineken Cup. The tournament was held between October 2006 and May 2007.

== Group stage ==
=== Pool 1 ===
Team	P	W	D	L	Tries for	Tries against	Try diff	Points for	Points against	Points diff	TB	LB	Pts
(Wales) Newport Gwent Dragons	6	5	0	1	29	10	19	211	79	132	4	1	25
(England) Bristol	6	5	0	1	26	6	20	168	69	99	4	1	25
(Romania) București	6	1	0	5	15	35	−20	124	230	−106	3	1	8
(France) Bayonne	6	1	0	5	14	33	−19	106	231	−125	2	1	7

=== Pool 2 ===
Team	P	W	D	L	Tries for	Tries against	Try diff	Points for	Points against	Points diff	TB	LB	Pts
(England) Saracens	6	5	1	0	35	9	26	225	101	124	5	0	26
(Scotland) Glasgow Warriors	6	4	1	1	25	10	15	204	72	132	3	1	22
(France) Narbonne	6	2	0	4	16	20	−4	127	171	−44	1	1	10
(Italy) Parma	6	0	0	6	6	43	−37	84	296	−212	0	1	1

=== Pool 3 ===
Team	P	W	D	L	Tries for	Tries against	Try diff	Points for	Points against	Points diff	TB	LB	Pts
(France) Brive	6	5	0	1	32	11	21	225	79	146	3	1	24
(England) Newcastle Falcons	6	4	0	2	29	11	18	181	85	96	4	1	21
(France) Montauban	6	3	0	3	13	13	0	107	98	9	1	0	13
(Italy) Petrarca Padova	6	0	0	6	6	45	−39	47	298	−251	0	0	0

=== Pool 4 ===
Team	P	W	D	L	Tries for	Tries against	Try diff	Points for	Points against	Points diff	TB	LB	Pts
(England) Bath Rugby	6	6	0	0	21	9	12	164	106	58	2	0	26
(England) NEC Harlequins	6	4	0	2	18	13	5	171	109	62	3	2	21
(Ireland) Connacht Rugby	6	1	0	5	15	16	−1	119	150	−31	2	2	8
(France) Montpellier	6	1	0	5	13	29	−16	116	205	−89	0	1	5

=== Pool 5 ===
Team	P	W	D	L	Tries for	Tries against	Try diff	Points for	Points against	Points diff	TB	LB	Pts
(France) Clermont	6	6	0	0	27	13	14	210	107	103	4	0	28
(England) Worcester Warriors	6	4	0	2	22	13	9	141	99	42	3	1	20
(Italy) Rugby Viadana	6	2	0	4	12	20	−8	114	145	−31	1	2	11
(France) Albi	6	0	0	6	7	22	−15	66	180	−114	0	0	0

== Seeding and runners-up ==
Seed	Pool Winners	Pts	TF	+/-
1	(France) Clermont	28	27	+103
2	(England) Saracens	26	35	+124
3	(England) Bath	26	21	+58
4	(Wales) Newport Gwent Dragons	25	29	+132
5	(France) Brive	24	32	+146
Seed	Pool Runners-up	Pts	TF	+/-
6	(England) Bristol	25	29	+132
7	(Scotland) Glasgow Warriors	22	25	+132
8	(England) Newcastle Falcons	21	29	+96
–	(England) Harlequins	21	18	+62
–	(England) Worcester Warriors	20	22	+42

== Knockout stage ==
=== Quarter-finals ===
30 March 2007
18:00

Clermont (France)	24–19	(England) Newcastle Falcons

Stade Marcel-Michelin
Attendance: 9,000

31 March 2007
12:00

Bath Rugby (England)	51–12	(England) Bristol

Recreation Ground
Attendance: 10,600

31 March 2007
15:00

Newport Gwent Dragons (Wales)	39–17	(France) Brive

Rodney Parade
Attendance: 7,112

1 April 2007
15:00

Saracens (England)	23–19	(Scotland) Glasgow Rugby

Vicarage Road
Attendance: 4,259

=== Semi-finals ===
21 April 2007
13:30

Clermont (France)	46–29	(Wales) Newport Gwent Dragons

Stade Marcel-Michelin
Attendance: 7,500

22 April 2007
12:30

Saracens (England)	30–31	(England) Bath Rugby

Vicarage Road
Attendance: 5,359

=== Final ===
19 May 2007
17:30

Clermont (France)	22–16	(England) Bath Rugby
Tries: Malzieu 43' c Marsh 53' m James 59' c Con: James (2/3) 43', 59'; Pen: James 19'	Report	Try: Maddock 63' c Con: Barkley (1/1) 64'; Pen: Barkley (3) 13', 37', 75'

Twickenham Stoop
Attendance: 10,134
Referee: Nigel Owens (Wales)

== See also ==
- European Challenge Cup
- 2006–07 Heineken Cup
