= Rugby Union South Australia =

Sports governing body in South Australia

- Sport: Rugby union
- Founded: 1932, Adelaide
- RA affiliation: 1949 (founding member)
- Website: sarugby.com.au

Rugby Union South Australia (RUSA) is the governing body for the sport of rugby union in the state of South Australia. It is a member of Rugby Australia and runs an amateur club competition in Adelaide consisting of men's teams in Premier grade, Premier reserves, Division 2 and Division 2 reserves; and junior teams grouped by age from under 7 to under 18. As of 2013, a women's competition has been included. The RUSA also selects representative teams each year to compete against other Australian states and territories.

According to Ausplay there are 972 participants in the state.

== History ==
South Australia had minimal connection to rugby union in the 19th and early 20th centuries. A rare exception was James Allen, born in Adelaide in 1855, who became in 1875 the first Australian-born undergraduate to play for the Cambridge University rugby union XV. Since 1885 sporadic rugby union clubs and teams came and went, primarily to play against sailors from visiting British Navy ships. In 1888 the first British Lions tourists included Adelaide on their itinerary, playing Australian rules football against local SAFA clubs and one rugby union match at the Adelaide Oval, easily defeating a 'South Australia' team of English ex-pats organised by Rugby School 'old boy' Henry Allerdale Grainger.

The SA Rugby Union was established in 1932 after journalist Ian Sabey, from The Advertiser, convened a public meeting. This meeting resulted in the formation of the Adelaide Rugby Club, with enough players to field two 7-a-side teams. Interest in the sport grew, and by the end of that year, the Royal Australian Navy, Adelaide University and the Waratahs were ready to field teams in a local competition.

Rugby union in the Adelaide area grew quickly and within a year, South Australia had fielded a team against Victoria for its first interstate match. The standard of the local competition and state team improved markedly following ex-England rugby union international, Australian-born Garnet Vere Portus, becoming a resident of Adelaide in 1935.

Rugby League benefited in the 1940s, when the Port Adelaide Rugby Union team fractured and changed codes. Over the following two decades, rugby grew across the metropolitan region and by the 1950s, South Australia boasted eight clubs. In 1951, with the competition and therefore financial risks growing, it was decided that it was in the Union's best interest to become an incorporated body. In the 1950s, 1960s, and early 1970s, the South Australian representative team competed in the Southern States Carnivals against Western Australia, Victoria and Tasmania. The SARU financed its own tour of Queensland and ACT in 1971, playing in Canberra, Toowoomba, and Brisbane.

By 1971 clubs included: Army, Adelaide University, Glenelg, Burnside, Elizabeth, Flinders University, North Adelaide, Old Collegians, Onkaparinga, Port Adelaide, Roseworthy College Rams, Salisbury, Southern Suburbs, West Torrens and Woodville.

Clubs which have fielded rugby teams in the past are: Aquinas, Black Forest, Central Districts, Flinders University, Gawler, Murray Bridge, North-West Districts, Salisbury, Smithfield Plains, Edinburgh, Lincoln, Pulteney Grammar School, Salisbury High School, Salisbury Com. Schools, Salisbury Teachers College, S.C.A.E., South Australian Institute of Technology, St Peters College, St Marks College, Tea Tree Gully, Kingswood, Adelaide, Royal Australian Naval Reserve, Whyalla, Waratahs, North Adelaide Baptist, Prince Alfred Old Collegians, Army, East Torrens, RAAF, SA Railways Institute and RAN. In 1978 Glenelg was renamed Brighton, the club's second name change, having previously been known as Kingston. In 2006 the Roseworthy college Rams were renamed Barossa Rams. Burnside fielded no junior teams until they amalgamated with The Waratahs Junior Rugby Union Football Club in 1992. North Torrens was formed when West Torrens and North Adelaide merged. Western Districts Junior Rugby Union Football Club (the Vikings) is the junior team for the two senior clubs of Woodville and Port Adelaide.

In 1995, Adelaide University and Old Collegians RFC established women's teams. Initially playing infrequently while building player numbers. By 2013 sufficient clubs had established women's teams for the Union to establish a formal competition.

Logo used from 2013 to 2017.

In 1999, SA Rugby again took on corporate change and release its Incorporated Association status and become a Company Limited by Guarantee, further underlining its commercial strength. In 2006, SA Rugby Union Ltd merged with the SA Junior Rugby Union.

In 2014 Old Collegians broke an 8-year drought to win the premier grade premiership

== Current clubs ==
As of 2018, there are fourteen clubs which make up RUSA, eleven of these clubs field senior men's sides, eight field senior women's sides and 11 field junior sides. There is also a golden oldies club for players 35+, and a rugby sevens club for women and girls (12+).

Club	Teams	Nickname	Home Ground	Entered competition
University of Adelaide	Men's, Women's, Juniors	Blacks	Waite Oval	1932
Barossa Rams RUFC	Men's, Women's, Juniors	Rams	Lyndoch Oval	2006
Brighton RUFC	Men's, Juniors	Tigers	Brighton Oval	1950
Burnside RUFC	Men's, Women's, Juniors	Burnside	Parkinson Oval	1946
Crippled Crows	Golden Oldies (35+)			
Elizabeth RUFC	Men's, Women's, Juniors	Lizzies	Womma Park	1958
Firebrand Rugby Sevens	Women's 7s, Girls 7s (12+)		Victoria Park	2016
North Torrens RUFC	Men's	Dragons	Dry Creek	1998
Old Collegians RFC	Men's, Women’s, Juniors	Old Colls	Tregenza Oval	1936
Onkaparinga RUFC	Men's, Women's, Juniors	Onkas	Wilfred Taylor Reserve	1968
Port Adelaide RUFC	Men's, Juniors	Pirates	Riverside Oval	1933
Southern Suburbs RUFC	Men's, Women's, Juniors	Bulls	Bailey Reserve	1946
Western Districts JRUFC	Juniors	Vikings	Riverside Oval	1997
Woodville RUFC	Men's, Women's, Juniors	Wasps	Gleneagels Reserve	1933

== Premiership winners ==
=== Coopers Premier Grade ===
- 2025- Burnside
- 2024- Burnside
- 2023- Burnside
- 2022- Brighton
- 2021- Burnside
- 2020- Brighton
- 2019- Burnside
- 2018- Brighton
- 2017- Brighton
- 2016- Old Collegians Rugby Club
- 2015- Onkaparinga
- 2014- Old Collegians Rugby Club
- 2013- Brighton
- 2012- Brighton
- 2011- Brighton
- 2010- Brighton
- 2009- Brighton
- 2008- Brighton
- 2007- Southern Suburbs
- 2006- Old Collegians Rugby Club
- 2005- Brighton
- 2004- Brighton
- 2003- Southern Suburbs
- 2002- Port Adelaide
- 2001- Old Collegians Rugby Club
- 2000- Brighton
- 1999- Burnside
- 1998- Old Collegians
- 1997- Brighton
- 1996- Brighton
- 1995- Brighton
- 1994- Brighton
- 1993- Brighton
- 1992- Brighton
- 1991- Old Collegians

=== Division One ===
- 2018 - Port Adelaide
- 2017 - Elizabeth

=== Premier Reserve Grade ===
- 2025- Old Collegians Rugby Club draw with Brighton, won by default
- 2024 - Brighton
- 2023 - Barossa Rams
- 2022 - Brighton
- 2021 -
- 2020 - Old Collegians
- 2019 -
- 2018 - Onkaparinga
- 2017 - Burnside
- 2016 - Barossa Rams
- 2015 - Burnside
- 2014- Old Collegians Rugby Club
- 2013- Old Collegians Rugby Club
- 2012- Old Collegians Rugby Club
- 2011- Burnside

== Representative teams ==
Black Falcons kit

The Black Falcons team is selected from senior players within South Australia each year, and competes against other amateur representative rugby teams from states including Victoria and Western Australia. Junior Falcons teams are also chosen to play in national age group competitions. The Southern Warriors is the women's seven-a-side team that competes in tournaments including the National Women's Sevens tournament.

The South Australian Under 20 team competes in the Southern States Championship and also plays occasional matches against other representative sides. Prior to 2008, state colts teams at under 21 and under 19 age levels were fielded in national competitions.

From 2018 Black Falcons compete into Emerging States Championship and in 2019 also a second developing team, South Australia Under 23.

- List of Australian club rugby union competitions
