= 1974 New Zealand rugby union tour of Ireland, Wales and England =

Summary
P	W	D	L
Total
8	7	1	0
Test match
1	1	0	0
Opponent
P	W	D	L
Ireland
1	1	0	0

The 1974 New Zealand rugby union tour of Ireland, Wales and England was a series of eight matches played by the New Zealand national rugby union team (the All Blacks) in November 1974.

The tour formed part of the celebrations of the centenary of the Irish Rugby Football Union and six of the eight matches were played in Ireland, culminating in the international against the Ireland national rugby union team. The tourists then moved to Wales to play a team designated 'A Welsh XV' but which was in fact a full-strength Wales team. Although neither Wales nor New Zealand awarded caps for the match it was a full international in all but name and attracted a crowd of 50,000 to Cardiff Arms Park for a midweek afternoon match. The final fixture was against the Barbarians who selected the entire pack of forwards who had played in the test matches on that year's 1974 British Lions tour to South Africa. The Barbarians held the All Blacks to a 13–13 draw and prevented them from completing a clean sweep by winning all eight matches on tour.

This was the first time that the All Blacks had undertaken a short tour to Europe. On each of the seven previous All Black tours the tourists had played at least fifteen fixtures and at least four full international matches.

== Matches ==
Scores and results list New Zealand's points tally first.

Opposing Team	For	Against	Date	Venue
Combined Irish Universities	10	3	6 November	The Mardyke, Cork
Munster	14	4	9 November	Thomond Park, Limerick
Leinster	8	3	13 November	Lansdowne Road, Dublin
Ulster	30	15	16 November	Ravenhill, Belfast
Connacht	25	3	20 November	Galway Showground, Galway
Ireland	15	6	23 November	Lansdowne Road, Dublin
Welsh XV	12	3	27 November	Cardiff Arms Park, Cardiff
Barbarians	13	13	30 November	Twickenham, London

== Bibliography ==
- Vivian Jenkins, ed. (1975). Rothmans Rugby Yearbook 1975–76. Queen Anne Press. pp. 36–41. ISBN 0362002215.
