= Arthur Devere Thomas =

Recipient of the Edward medal (1895–1973)

Arthur Devere Thomas GC (5 August 1895 – 1 November 1973) was awarded the Edward Medal, later exchanged for the George Cross, in 1931 for the following action:

On 14 January 1931 a workman who was engaged in dismantling a wooden staging fixed across the track of the Metropolitan Railway Station at Kings Cross, slipped and fell from a height of about 20 feet to the permanent way of the down Inner Circle line. He was unconscious and lay face downwards across one running rail with his head close to the negative rail of the electrified system. Mr. Thomas, who was acting as flagman for the protection of the workmen, saw the man fall and at the same time heard a down train approaching the station round the curve. Realising that a signal could not be seen by the driver in time for him to stop the train, Mr, Thomas immediately jumped down from the platform to the up line and, crossing two positive and two negative rails carrying 600 volts, snatched the unconscious man from almost under the wheels of the approaching train and held him in a small recess in the wall whilst the train passed within a few inches of them.
