= List of football stadiums in France =

The following lists of football stadiums in France, ranked in order of capacity, with the minimum capacity being 5,000.

== Current stadiums ==
=== Capacity above 20,000 ===
#	Image	Stadium	Capacity	City	Region	Home team	Opened	UEFA rank
1		Stade de France	81,338	Paris (Saint-Denis)	Île-de-France	France national football team; France national rugby union team	1998	4/4 stars
2		Stade Vélodrome	67,394	Marseille	Provence-Alpes-Côte d'Azur	Olympique de Marseille	1937	4/4 stars
3		Parc Olympique Lyonnais	59,186	Lyon (Décines-Charpieu)	Auvergne-Rhône-Alpes	Olympique Lyonnais	2016	4/4 stars
4		Stade Pierre-Mauroy	50,157	Lille (Villeneuve-d'Ascq)	Hauts-de-France	Lille OSC	2012	4/4 stars
5		Parc des Princes	47,929	Paris	Île-de-France	Paris Saint-Germain FC	1972	4/4 stars
6		Matmut Atlantique	42,115	Bordeaux	Nouvelle-Aquitaine	FC Girondins de Bordeaux	2015	4/4 stars
7		Stade Geoffroy-Guichard	41,965	Saint-Étienne	Auvergne-Rhône-Alpes	AS Saint-Étienne	1931	4/4 stars
8		Stade Bollaert-Delelis	38,223	Lens	Hauts-de-France	RC Lens	1932	4/4 stars
9		Stade de la Beaujoire	37,473	Nantes	Pays de la Loire	FC Nantes	1984	4/4 stars
10		Allianz Riviera	35,624	Nice	Provence-Alpes-Côte d'Azur	OGC Nice	2013	4/4 stars
11		Stade de Gerland	35,029	Lyon	Auvergne-Rhône-Alpes	Lyon OU	1926	3/4 stars
12		Stade Chaban-Delmas	34,462	Bordeaux	Nouvelle-Aquitaine	Union Bordeaux Bègles	1938	
13		Stadium Municipal	33,150	Toulouse	Occitanie	Toulouse FC	1937	4/4 stars
14		Stade de la Mosson	32,939	Montpellier	Occitanie	Montpellier HSC	1972	3/4 stars
15		Stade de la Meinau	32,300	Strasbourg	Grand Est	RC Strasbourg	1914	4/4 stars
16		Stade Saint-Symphorien	30,000	Metz	Grand Est	FC Metz	1923	3/4 stars
17		Roazhon Park	29,778	Rennes	Brittany	Stade Rennais FC	1912	3/4 stars
18		Stade Océane	25,178	Le Havre	Normandy	Le Havre AC	2012	4/4 stars
19		MMArena	25,064	Le Mans	Pays de la Loire	Le Mans UC	2011	4/4 stars
20		Stade du Hainaut	24,926	Valenciennes	Hauts-de-France	Valenciennes FC	2011	
21		Stade Louis Dugauguez	23,189	Sedan	Grand Est	Club Sportif Sedan Ardennes	2000	
22		Stade Auguste-Delaune	21,684	Reims	Grand Est	Stade Reims	1935	
23		Stade Michel d'Ornano	21,500	Caen	Normandy	Stade Malherbe Caen	1993	
24		Stade de l'Aube	20,400	Troyes	Grand Est	Troyes AC	1924	
25		Stade Marcel Picot	20,087	Tomblaine	Grand Est	AS Nancy	1926	
26		Stade des Alpes	20,068	Grenoble	Auvergne-Rhône-Alpes	Grenoble Foot 38, FC Grenoble Rugby	2008	
27		Stade Auguste Bonal	20,025	Montbéliard	Bourgogne-Franche-Comté	FC Sochaux-Montbéliard	2000	
28		Stade Sébastien Charléty	20,000	Paris	Île-de-France	Paris FC	1938	

=== Capacity below 20,000 ===
Stadiums with a capacity of at least 10,000 are included.

#	Image	Stadium	Capacity	City	Region	Home team(s)	Opened	Sport	Notes
1		Stade Raymond Kopa	19,800	Angers	Ville d'Angers	Angers SCO	1912 (2022)	Football	
2		Stade de Roudourou	19,060 (Note: Le The official site states an official capacity of 18700 places at Stade de Roudourou.)	Guingamp	Ville de Guingamp	EA Guingamp	1990 (2018)	Football	
3		Stade Robert Bobin	18,850	Bondoufle	Département de l'Essonne	Paris FC (women)	1994 (2022)	Football	FC Fleury 91; Évry FC
4		Stade de l'Abbé-Deschamps	18,541	Auxerre	AJ Auxerre	AJ Auxerre	1918 (2015)	Football	
5		Stadium Lille Métropole	18,500 (Note: The authorized capacity for football matches at the Stadium Lille Métropole in the 2000s was up to 18185 places.)	Villeneuve-d'Ascq (Lille)	Métropole européenne de Lille	Olympique Marcquois Rugby	1975 (2010)	Football; Rugby union	LOSC Lille; Wasquehal Football
6		Stade du Moustoir	18,500	Lorient	Ville de Lorient	FC Lorient	1959 (2010)	Football	
7		Stade Gaston Gérard	18,376	Dijon	Ville de Dijon	Dijon FCO	1934 (2017)	Football	
8		Stade Gaston-Petit	17,072	Châteauroux	Ville de Châteauroux	LB Châteauroux	1962 (1997)	Football	
9		Stade Jules Deschaseaux	16,382	Le Havre	Ville du Havre	Le Havre AC	1931 (1999)	Rugby union	Le Havre AC rugby
10		Stade Armand-Cesari	16,048	Furiani (Bastia)	Communauté d'agglomération de Bastia	SC Bastia	1932 (2018)	Football	CA Bastia
11		Stade Marcel-Deflandre	16,000 (16,500)	La Rochelle	Ville de La Rochelle	Stade Rochelais	1926 (2023)	Rugby union	
12		Parc des sports	15,714	Annecy	Ville d'Annecy	FC Annecy	1964 (2022)	Football	Evian Thonon Gaillard FC
13		Stade Francis-Le Blé	15,220	Brest	Ville de Brest	Stade brestois 29	1922 (2010)	Football	
14		Stade Jean Laville	14,753	Gueugnon	Ville de Gueugnon	FC Gueugnon	1939 (2003)	Football	
15		Stade Georges-Pompidou	14,380	Valence	Ville de Valence	ASOA Valence; ROC La Voulte-Valence	1974	Football; Rugby union	
16		Stade Gabriel-Montpied	13,700 (17,735)	Clermont-Ferrand	Ville de Clermont-Ferrand	Clermont Foot 63	1995 (2025)	Football	
17		Stade municipal de Beaublanc	13,182	Limoges	Ville de Limoges	USA Limoges	1924 (2018)	Rugby union	Limoges FC
18		Stade de la Licorne	12,999	Amiens	Communauté d'agglomération Amiens Métropole	Amiens SC	1999	Football	RC Lens
19		Stade Pierre-Antoine	12,550	Castres	Ville de Castres	Castres olympique	1907 (2017)	Football	
20		Stade Parsemain	12,500	Fos-sur-Mer (Istres)	Istres-Ouest-Provence	FC Istres; ES Fos-Sur-Mer	2005	Football	
21		Stade de l'Épopée	12,432	Calais	Ville de Calais	RC Calais	2008	Football	Calais RUFC
22		Stade Dominique Duvauchelle	12,150	Créteil (Paris)	Métropole du Grand Paris	US Créteil-Lusitanos	1983 (2004)	Football	
23		Stade François Coty	12,096	Ajaccio	AC Ajaccio	AC Ajaccio	1969 (2012)	Football	
24		Stade Robert Diochon	12,018	Le Petit-Quevilly (Rouen)	Métropole Rouen Normandie	FC Rouen; US Quevilly-Rouen; Rouen Normandie Rugby	1914 (2022)	Football; Rugby union	
25		Stade Michel-Amand	12,000	Poitiers	Grand Poitiers	Stade Poitevin FC	1989 (1995)	Football	
26		Stadium Vénissieux	11,805	Vénissieux (Lyon)	Ville de Lyon		2011	Football	Lyon OU
27		Stade de la Rabine	11,415	Vannes	Ville de Vannes	Vannes OC; RC Vannes	1959 (2022)	Football; Rugby union	
28		Stade Francis Le Basser	11,107	Laval	Laval Agglomération	Stade Lavallois	1971 (2001)	Football	
29		Stade Léo Lagrange	10,307	Besançon	Ville de Besançon	Racing Besançon; Besançon Football	1939 (2005)	Football	
30		Stade Pierre Brisson	10,178	Beauvais	Ville de Beauvais	AS Beauvais Oise; Beauvais RC	1935 (1999)	Football; Rugby union	FC Chambly Oise; Red Star FC
31		Stade de la Vallée du Cher	10,128	Tours	Ville de Tours	Tours FC	1978 (2011)	Football	

=== Capacity below 10,000 ===
Stadiums with a capacity of at least 5,000 are included.

Stadium	Capacity	City	Home team
Stade Pierre Blouen	9,000	Cholet	SO Cholet
Stade de la Source	7,000	Orléans	US Orléans
Stade Guy Piriou	6,500	Concarneau	US Concarneau
Stade Paul-Lignon	5,955	Rodez	Rodez AF, Stade Rodez Aveyron
Stade Bauer	5,600	Saint-Ouen-sur-Seine	Red Star FC

== See also ==
- List of European stadiums by capacity
- List of rugby union stadiums in France
- List of indoor arenas in France
- List of association football stadiums by country
- List of sports venues by capacity
- Lists of stadiums
- Football in France
