= List of rugby union stadiums by capacity =

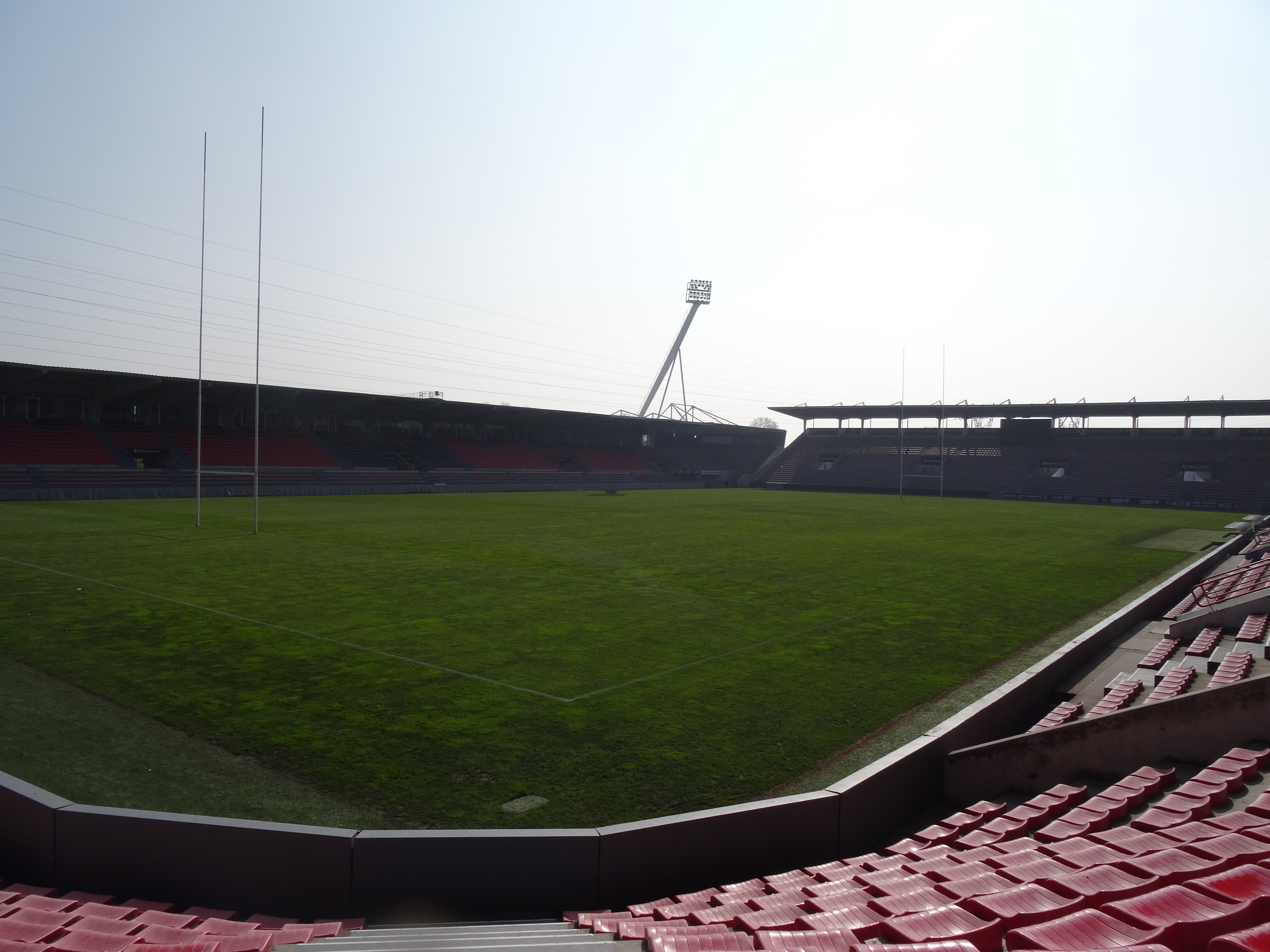
The Stade Ernest-Wallon, the home of Stade Toulousain.

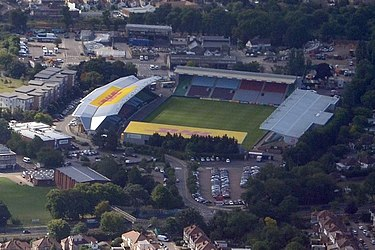
The Twickenham Stoop, the home of Harlequins.

The following is a list of stadiums at which rugby union is played, ordered by seating capacity. Currently all stadiums with a capacity of 10,000 or more which are the regular home venue of a club or national team, or are the regular hosts of a major competition (such as an event in the World Rugby Sevens Series, its women's version, or the final of an annual national competition), are included. Stadiums for which the only rugby union use is hosting occasional matches or which have only hosted one-off rugby union tournaments are not included. Not all of these stadiums are primarily venues for rugby union, with some being primarily venues for another sport.

== Current stadiums ==
| # | Stadium | Capacity | City | Country | Tenants/use | Image |
|---|---|---|---|---|---|---|
| 1 | FNB Stadium | 94,736 | Johannesburg | South Africa | Some South Africa national rugby union team matches and some Varsity Cup matches | |
| 2 | Stadium Australia | 84,000 | Sydney | Australia | Some Australia national team matches | |
| 3 | Twickenham Stadium | 82,000 | London | England | England national team, Gallagher Premiership final, selected Harlequins matches, London Sevens, London Women's Sevens final and third-place match | |
| 4 | Stade de France | 81,338 | Saint-Denis (Note: Stade de France is often stated as being in Paris. Although it is in the metropolitan area, it is not in the city proper, as evidenced by its postal code of 93216. The first two digits of "93" indicate that it is in the department of Seine-Saint-Denis. Paris is department 75.) | France | Most France national team matches, (Note: France play Tests throughout the country, but typically play all Six Nations home matches at Stade de France (although one match in 2018 will be held in Marseille).) Top 14 final | |
| 5 | Principality Stadium | 74,500 | Cardiff | Wales | Wales national team, Judgement Day | |
| 6 | Stadio Olimpico | 73,000 | Rome | Italy | Most Italy national team matches (Note: Italy play Tests throughout the country, but since 2012 have played all Six Nations home matches at Stadio Olimpico.) | |
| 7 | Orange Vélodrome | 67,394 | Marseille | France | Some France national team matches, some Toulon matches | |
| 8 | Murrayfield Stadium | 67,144 | Edinburgh | Scotland | Scotland national team matches | |
| 9 | Ellis Park Stadium | 62,567 | Johannesburg | South Africa | Lions, Golden Lions, some South Africa national team matches | |
| 10 | Optus Stadium | 60,000 | Perth | Australia | Some Australian national team matches | |
| 11 | Cape Town Stadium | 58,310 | Cape Town | South Africa | Stormers, Western Province, South Africa Sevens (2015–present), some South Africa national team matches | |
| 12 | Marvel Stadium | 56,347 | Melbourne | Australia | Some Australia national team matches | |
| 13 | Boris Paichadze Stadium | 56,000 | Tbilisi | Georgia | Many Georgia national team matches | |
| 14 | National Stadium | 55,000 | Singapore | Singapore | Singapore Sevens (2016–present), some Sunwolves matches | |
| 15 | Estadio Ciudad de La Plata | 53,000 | La Plata | Argentina | Some Argentina national team matches | |
| 16 | Suncorp Stadium | 52,500 | Brisbane | Australia | Queensland Reds, some Australia national team matches | |
| 17 | Kings Park Stadium | 52,000 | Durban | South Africa | Sharks, Sharks (Currie Cup), some South Africa national team matches | |
| 18 | Loftus Versfeld Stadium | 51,762 | Pretoria | South Africa | Bulls, Blue Bulls, some South Africa national team matches | |
| 19 | Aviva Stadium | 51,700 | Dublin | Ireland | Ireland national rugby union team, some Leinster matches. | |
| 20 | King Baudouin Stadium | 51,122 | Brussels | Belgium | Belgium national team | |
| 21 | Kai Tak Stadium | 50,000 | Hong Kong | Hong Kong | Hong Kong Sevens (2025–present), some Hong Kong national team matches | |
| 22 | Eden Park | 50,000 | Auckland | New Zealand | Auckland Rugby Football Union, Blues, some New Zealand national team matches | |
| 23 | The Sevens | 50,000 (Note: The Sevens has a permanent capacity of 4,000, but is designed to be expandable to 50,000 with temporary seating. The full capacity is used for the annual Dubai Sevens tournament, and was also used when the stadium hosted the 2009 Rugby World Cup Sevens.) | Dubai | United Arab Emirates | Dubai Sevens, Dubai Women's Sevens, and most United Arab Emirates national team matches; also hosted most Arabian Gulf rugby union team matches before that team's 2010 breakup | |
| 24 | Estadio José Amalfitani | 49,540 | Buenos Aires | Argentina | Jaguares, some Argentina national team matches | |
| 25 | Nelson Mandela Bay Stadium | 48,459 | Port Elizabeth | South Africa | Southern Kings, Eastern Province Elephants, South Africa Sevens (2011–2014), some South Africa national team matches | |
| 26 | Sydney Football Stadium | 45,500 | Sydney | Australia | New South Wales Waratahs, Australian Sevens (starting 2022) | |
| 27 | Toyota Stadium | 45,000 | Toyota | Japan | Toyota Verblitz | |
| 28 | Patersons Stadium | 42,922 | Perth | Australia | Some Australia national team matches | |
| 29 | Matmut Atlantique | 42,115 | Bordeaux | France | Some Union Bordeaux Bègles matches | |
| 30 | Hong Kong Stadium | 40,000 | Hong Kong | Hong Kong | Hong Kong Sevens (1976–2024), some Hong Kong national team matches | |
| 31 | Free State Stadium | 36,538 | Bloemfontein | South Africa | Free State Cheetahs, some Cheetahs matches | |
| 32 | Allianz Riviera | 35,624 | Nice | France | Some Toulon matches (Note: In recent years, Toulon have taken occasional home matches in both the Top 14 and European Rugby Champions Cup to this ground.) | |
| 33 | Stadium Municipal | 35,472 | Toulouse | France | Some Stade Toulousain matches (Note: Stade Toulousain regularly take at least two matches in the Top 14 and one in the European Rugby Champions Cup to this ground every season, though it was unable to do so from 2013–2015 due to renovations for UEFA Euro 2016.) | |
| 34 | Sky Stadium | 34,500 | Wellington | New Zealand | Hurricanes, Wellington Rugby Football Union, some New Zealand national team matches, Wellington Sevens | |
| 35 | Stade Chaban-Delmas | 34,462 | Bordeaux | France | Most Union Bordeaux Bègles matches | |
| 36 | Rotorua International Stadium | 34,000 | Rotorua | New Zealand | Some Bay of Plenty Steamers matches | |
| 37 | Paris La Défense Arena | 32,000 | Nanterre | France | Racing 92 | |
| 38 | Forsyth Barr Stadium at University Plaza | 30,748 | Dunedin | New Zealand | Highlanders, Otago Rugby Football Union, some New Zealand national team matches | |
| 39 | Noevir Stadium Kobe | 30,132 | Kobe | Japan | Kobelco Steelers | |
| 40 | AAMI Park | 30,050 | Melbourne | Australia | Some Australia Rugby Union Team matches | |
| 41 | Kintetsu Hanazono Rugby Stadium | 30,000 | Higashiōsaka | Japan | Kintetsu Liners | |
| 42 | Mt Smart Stadium | 30,000 | Auckland | New Zealand | Counties Manukau Rugby Union | |
| 43 | Mikheil Meskhi Stadium | 27,223 | Tbilisi | Georgia | Some Georgia national team matches | |
| 44 | Chichibunomiya Rugby Stadium | 27,188 | Tokyo | Japan | Most Japan national rugby union team matches, (Note: Japan play Tests throughout the country, but Chichibunomiya is the most widely used ground, and also houses the headquarters of the country's national federation.) | |
| 45 | Ashton Gate Stadium | 27,000 | Bristol | England | Bristol | |
| 46 | Dignity Health Sports Park Soccer Stadium | 27,000 | Carson | United States | RFCLA | |
| 47 | Welford Road | 26,000 | Leicester | England | Leicester Tigers | |
| 48 | FMG Stadium Waikato | 25,800 | Hamilton | New Zealand | Waikato Rugby Union, Chiefs | |
| 49 | Thomond Park | 25,600 | Limerick | Ireland | Munster, Shannon RFC, UL Bohemians RFC | |
| 50 | Canberra Stadium | 25,011 | Canberra | Australia | Brumbies | |
| 51 | Nittawela Rugby Stadium | 25,000 | Kandy | Sri Lanka | Kandy SC | |
| 52 | Pam Brink Stadium | 25,000 | Springs | South Africa | Some Falcons matches | |
| 53 | North Harbour Stadium | 25,000 | Albany | New Zealand | North Harbour Rugby Union | |
| 54 | Okara Park | 25,000 | Whangārei | New Zealand | Northland Rugby Football Union | |
| 55 | Yarrow Stadium | 25,000 | New Plymouth | New Zealand | Taranaki Rugby Football Union | |
| 56 | The Darlington Arena | 25,000 | Darlington | England | Darlington Mowden Park | |
| 57 | Dubai Exiles Rugby Ground | 24,000 | Dubai | UAE | Some Arabian Gulf rugby union team matches, many local club matches | |
| 58 | York Park | 21,000 | Launceston | Australia | 2003 Rugby World Cup | A small stand to the left and a two tier stand and scoreboard filled with people in the backdrop of an oval grass playing surface scattered with players. Spectators stand in the foreground. |
| 59 | Liberty Stadium | 20,532 | Swansea | Wales | Ospreys | |
| 60 | HBF Park | 20,500 | Perth | Australia | Western Force | |
| 61 | Stade des Alpes | 20,068 | Grenoble | France | Most FC Grenoble matches | |
| 62 | America First Field | 20,008 | Sandy | United States | Utah Warriors | |
| 63 | SeatGeek Stadium | 20,000 | Bridgeview | United States | Chicago Hounds | |
| 64 | Concord Oval | 20,000 | Concord | Australia | West Harbour RFC | |
| 65 | North Sydney Oval | 20,000 | Sydney | Australia | Northern Suburbs Rugby Club | |
| 66 | Owen Delany Park | 20,000 | Taupō | New Zealand | King Country Rugby Football Union | |
| 67 | Stade Jean-Bouin | 20,000 | Paris | France | Stade Français, France Sevens (2016–present) | |
| 68 | Stade Makis | 20,000 | Antananarivo | Madagascar | Madagascar national team, local club matches | |
| 69 | Baypark Stadium | 19,800 | Mount Maunganui | New Zealand | Bay of Plenty Rugby Union | |
| 70 | Dick's Sporting Goods Park | 19,680 | Commerce City | United States | Denver Barbarians | |
| 71 | Stadio Euganeo | 19,500 | Padua | Italy | | |
| 72 | Stade Ernest-Wallon | 19,500 | Toulouse | France | Stade Toulousain | |
| 73 | Stadio della Vittoria | 19,253 | Bari | Italy | | |
| 74 | Queenstown Events Centre | 19,000 | Queenstown | New Zealand | Some Highlanders matches | |
| 75 | Stade de la Méditerranée | 18,555 | Béziers | France | AS Béziers Hérault | |
| 76 | RDS Arena | 18,500 | Dublin | Ireland | Leinster | |
| 77 | Subaru Park | 18,500 | Chester | United States | Collegiate Rugby Championship | |
| 78 | Ravenhill Stadium | 18,196 | Belfast | Northern Ireland | Ulster | |
| 79 | Stade Marcel-Michelin | 18,030 | Clermont-Ferrand | France | ASM Clermont Auvergne | |
| 80 | Ballymore Stadium | 18,000 | Brisbane | Australia | Brisbane City, Queensland Premier Rugby Grand Final and some individual matches, Queensland XV matches, some Reds preseason matches, Australian national rugby union academy | |
| 81 | Griqua Park | 18,000 | Kimberley | South Africa | some Cheetahs matches | |
| 82 | Apollo Projects Stadium | 18,000 | Christchurch | New Zealand | Crusaders, Canterbury | |
| 83 | Arena Manawatu | 18,000 | Palmerston North | New Zealand | Manawatu Turbos | |
| 84 | Stade Aimé Giral | 17,500 | Perpignan | France | USA Perpignan | |
| 85 | Rugby Park Stadium | 17,000 | Invercargill | New Zealand | Southland Rugby Football Union | |
| 86 | Stade Jean Dauger | 17,000 | Bayonne | France | Aviron Bayonnais | |
| 87 | Yamaha Stadium | 16,879 | Iwata | Japan | Yamaha Júbilo | |
| 88 | Stade Guy Boniface | 16,800 | Mont-de-Marsan | France | Stade Montois | |
| 89 | Kingsholm Stadium | 16,500 | Gloucester | England | Gloucester | |
| 90 | Trafalgar Park | 16,000 | Nelson | New Zealand | Tasman | |
| 91 | Danie Craven Stadium | 16,000 | Stellenbosch | South Africa | FNB Varsity Cup | |
| 92 | Stade Mayol | 15,700 | Toulon | France | Toulon | |
| 93 | Franklin's Gardens | 15,500 | Northampton | England | Northampton Saints | |
| 94 | Central Stadium | 15,000 | Krasnoyarsk | Russia | Russia national team, local club matches | |
| 95 | Bilino Polje | 15,000 | Zenica | Bosnia and Herzegovina | Bosnia and Herzegovina national team | |
| 96 | Parc des Sports Aguiléra | 15,000 | Biarritz | France | Biarritz Olympique | |
| 97 | National Stadium | 15,000 | Suva | Fiji | | |
| 98 | Stade Amédée-Domenech | 15,000 | Brive-la-Gaillarde | France | CA Brive | |
| 99 | Stade Maurice Boyau | 15,000 | Dax | France | US Dax | |
| 100 | Mizuho Rugby Stadium | 15,000 | Nagoya City | Japan | Some Japan national team matches, several local clubs | |
| 101 | Apia Park | 15,000 | Apia | Samoa | Samoa national team | |
| 102 | Parc y Scarlets | 14,870 | Llanelli | Wales | Scarlets, Llanelli RFC | |
| 103 | Twickenham Stoop | 14,816 | London | England | Harlequins, London Women's Sevens (2015) | |
| 104 | GGL Stadium | 14,700 | Montpellier | France | Montpellier | |
| 105 | Stade Georges Pompidou | 14,380 | Valence | France | La Voulte-Valence | |
| 106 | Stadio Giglio | 14,138 | Reggio Emilia | Italy | Local club matches; formerly Aironi | |
| 107 | Stade Armandie | 14,000 | Agen | France | SU Agen | |
| 108 | Estadio Charrúa | 14,000 | Montevideo | Uruguay | Uruguay national team | |
| 109 | Stade Olympique Yves-du-Manoir | 14,000 | Colombes | France | Racing 92 | |
| 110 | Stade du Hameau | 13,966 | Pau | France | Section Paloise | |
| 111 | Recreation Ground | 13,500 | Bath | England | Bath | |
| 112 | Stadium Municipal d'Albi | 13,058 | Albi | France | SC Albi | |
| 113 | Stade Sapiac | 12,600 | Montauban | France | US Montauban | |
| 114 | BT Sport Cardiff Arms Park | 12,500 | Cardiff | Wales | Cardiff Blues, Cardiff RFC | |
| 115 | Stade Marcel-Deflandre | 12,500 | La Rochelle | France | Stade Rochelais | |
| 116 | Sandy Park | 15,600 | Exeter | England | Exeter Chiefs | |
| 117 | Estadio Nacional Complutense | 12,400 | Madrid | Spain | Many Spain national team matches | |
| 118 | Estadio GEBA | 12,133 | Buenos Aires | Argentina | Gimnasia y Esgrima de Buenos Aires | |
| 119 | Sixways | 12,024 | Worcester | England | Worcester Warriors | |
| 120 | Velodromo Paolo Borsellino | 12,000 | Palermo | Italy | Palermo Rugby | |
| 121 | AJ Bell Stadium | 12,000 | Salford | England | Sale Sharks | |
| 122 | Fraser Park | 12,000 | Timaru | New Zealand | South Canterbury Rugby Football Union | |
| 123 | Arturo Collana Stadium | 12,000 | Naples | Italy | Partenope Rugby | |
| 124 | Parc des Sports Et de l'Amitié | 12,000 | Narbonne | France | RC Narbonne | |
| 125 | Stade Lesdiguières | 11,900 | Grenoble | France | Some FC Grenoble matches | |
| 126 | Rodney Parade | 11,676 | Newport, Wales | Wales | Dragons Newport RFC | |
| 127 | Stade Pierre-Fabre | 11,500 | Castres | France | Castres Olympique | |
| 128 | Stade Michel Bendichou | 11,430 | Colomiers | France | US Colomiers | |
| 129 | Stade Gabriel Montpied | 10,607 | Clermont-Ferrand | France | France Women's Sevens | |
| 130 | American Legion Memorial Stadium | 10,500 | Charlotte | United States | Anthem Rugby Carolina | |
| 131 | Kingston Park | 10,200 | Newcastle | England | Newcastle Falcons | |
| 132 | Arena Civica | 10,200 | Milan | Italy | Amatori Milano | |
| 133 | Churchill Park | 10,000 | Lautoka | Fiji | Colonial Cup, Digicel Cup | |
| 134 | Allianz Park | 10,000 | London | England | Saracens | |
| 135 | Dubarry Park | 10,000 | Athlone | Ireland | Buccaneers RFC & AIB League Final | |
| 136 | Outeniqua Park | 10,000 | George | South Africa | SWD Eagles; used for the South Africa Sevens from 2002 to 2010 | |
| 137 | Tommaso Fattori Stadium | 10,000 | L'Aquila | Italy | L'Aquila Rugby 1936 | |
| 138 | Stade d'Albert Domec | 10,000 | Carcassonne | France | US Carcassonne | |
| 139 | Stade André Moga | 10,000 | Bègles | France | Some Union Bordeaux Bègles matches | |
| 140 | Stade Pierre Rajon | 10,000 | Bourgoin-Jallieu | France | CS Bourgoin-Jallieu | |
| 141 | Gold Mine on Airline | 10,000 | Metairie | United States | New Orleans Gold | |
| 142 | Stadionul Arcul de Triumf | 8,200 | Bucharest | Romania | Romania national rugby union team | |

== Closed or demolished stadiums ==
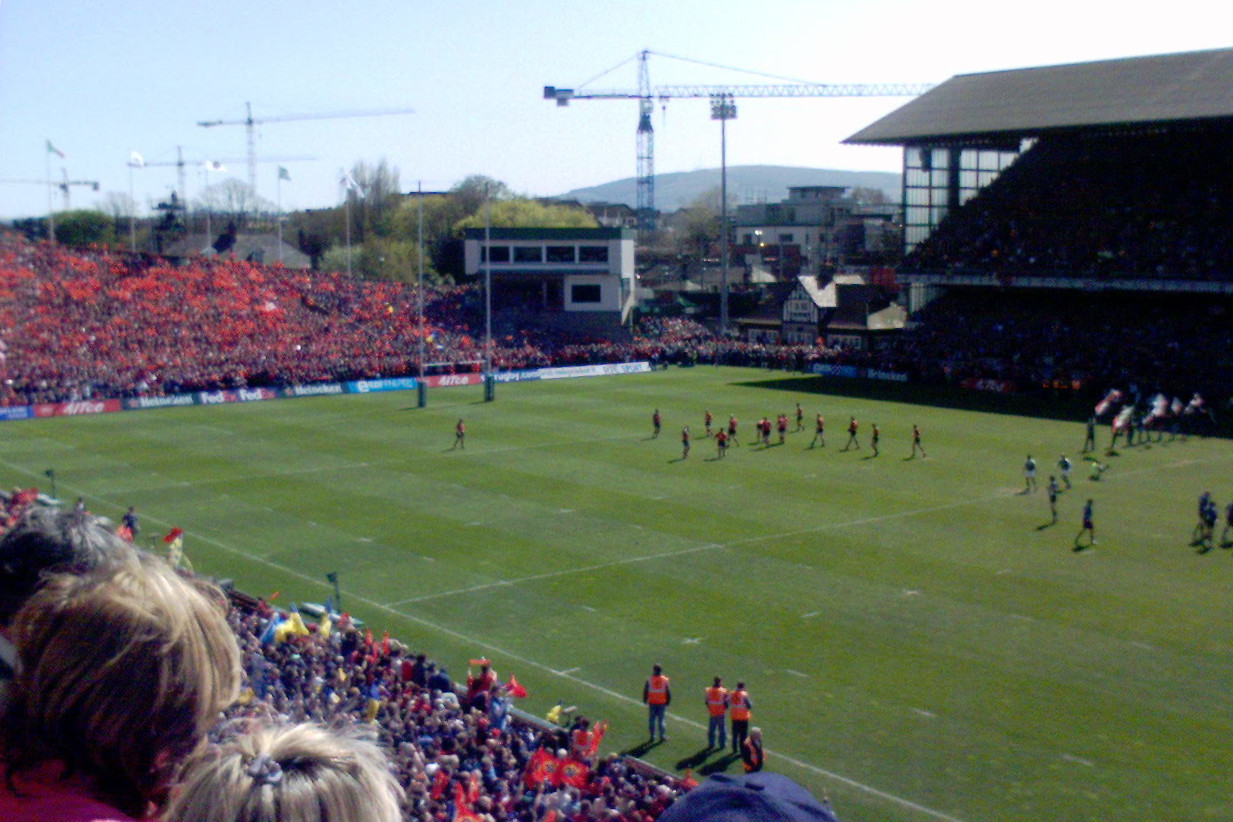
Lansdowne Road Stadium

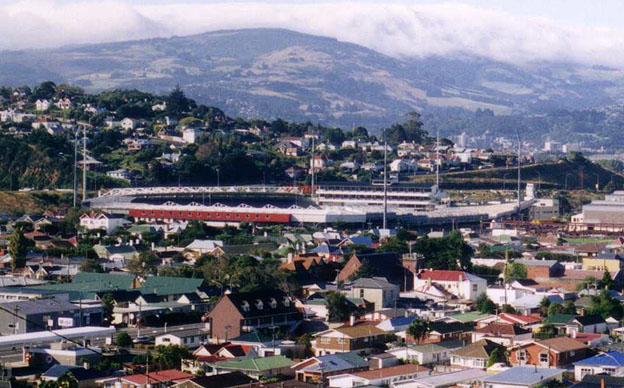
Carisbrook

| Stadium | Capacity (at time of closure) | City | Country | Home team | Closed | Fate |
|---|---|---|---|---|---|---|
| The National Stadium | 53,000 | Cardiff | Wales | Wales national team | 1997 | Replaced by Millennium Stadium. The 1970 North Stand of National Stadium (Cardiff Arms Park) forms "Glanmor's Gap" in Millennium Stadium; the remainder was demolished. |
| Newlands Stadium | 51,900 | Cape Town | South Africa | Stormers, Western Province, some South Africa national team matches | 2021 | The stadium was set to be demolished, but was never demolished. Still till this day the stadium is there completely unused. |
| Lansdowne Road | 49,000 | Dublin | Ireland | Ireland national team | 2007 | Demolished and replaced on-site by Aviva Stadium. |
| PETCO Park | 42,445 | San Diego | United States | USA Sevens | 2010 | Remains in use for its original purpose of baseball. |
| Athletic Park | 39,000 | Wellington | New Zealand | Wellington Hurricanes, Wellington Rugby Football Union, some New Zealand national team matches | 1999 | Demolished. The replacement venue, Wellington Regional Stadium, is 5.9 km (~3.7 miles) away. |
| Lancaster Park | 36,000 | Christchurch | New Zealand | Crusaders, Canterbury Rugby Football Union, some New Zealand national team matches | 2011 | Following major damage from the February 2011 Christchurch earthquake, one stand was demolished, and demolition of the rest of the ground was mostly completed by September 2019. |
| Carisbrook | 29,000 | Dunedin | New Zealand | Highlanders, Otago Rugby Football Union, some New Zealand national team matches | 2011 | Demolition began in early 2012. Parts of the stadium will be preserved or reused. |
| Dignity Health Sports Park | 27,000 | Carson | United States | USA Sevens | 2007 | Remains in use for its original purpose of football (soccer). |
| Cardiff City Stadium | 26,828 | Cardiff | Wales | Cardiff Blues | 2014 | Remains in use for its original purpose of football (soccer). |
| Vicarage Road | 19,920 | Watford | England | Saracens | 2013 | Remains in use for its original purpose of football (soccer). |
| Loftus Road | 18,500 | London | England | London Wasps | 2001 | Remains in use for its original purpose of football (soccer). |
| Meadowbank Stadium | 16,500 | Edinburgh | Scotland | Edinburgh | 2006 | Remains in use for many other sports, including football (soccer) and American football. |
| Racecourse Ground | 15,500 | Wrexham | Wales | Scarlets | 2009 | Remains in use for its original purpose of football (soccer), and has hosted rugby league since 2010. |
| Stade Jean-Bouin | 12,000 | Paris | France | Stade Français | 2010 | Replaced on-site by a new stadium of the same name that opened in 2013. |
| Edgeley Park | 10,900 | Stockport | England | Sale Sharks | 2012 | Remains in use for its original purpose of football (soccer). |
| Firhill | 10,887 | Glasgow | Scotland | Glasgow Warriors | 2012 | Remains in use for its original purpose of football (soccer). |

== Future stadiums ==
This list includes stadiums that are either under construction or planned.

| Stadium | Capacity (planned) | City | Country | Home team/Event Hosting | Opening | Images |
|---|---|---|---|---|---|---|
| DSC Multi-Purpose Stadium | 60,000 | Dubai | United Arab Emirates | | TBA | |
| One New Zealand Stadium: "Te Kaha" | 30,000 (25,000 Permanent, 5,000 Temporary) | Christchurch | New Zealand | Crusaders (Super Rugby); Canterbury Rugby (NPC); New Zealand National Rugby Team (Tests) | April, 2026 | |
| Macquarie Point Stadium | 24,500 | Hobart | Australia | | 2029 | |

== See also ==
- List of Australian rugby union stadiums by capacity
- List of English rugby union stadiums by capacity
- List of rugby union stadiums in France
- List of Super Rugby stadiums
- List of rugby league stadiums by capacity
- Lists of stadiums
