= 1969–70 French Rugby Union Championship =

French Rugby Championship 1969–70
- Countries: France
- Number of teams: 64
- Champions: La Voulte (1st title)
- Runners-up: Montferrand

== Formula ==
The 1969–70 French Rugby Union Championship was contested by 64 teams divided in 8 pools. The first four of each pool, were qualified for the "last 32".

The club of La Voulte Sportif (now merged into ROC La Voulte-Valence) won the competition beating Montferrand (now known as ASM Clermont Auvergne) in the final. La Voulte won le Bouclier de Brennus at his first final, while 'Montferrand lost their fourth final of four.

== Qualification round ==
In bold the clubs qualified for the next round. The teams are listed according to the final ranking

=== Pool 1 ===
- **Béziers**
- **Bègles**
- **Stade Beaumontois**
- **Angoulême**
- Carmaux
- Oyonnax
- Le Creusot
- Castres

=== Pool 2 ===
- **Toulouse**
- **Biarritz**
- **Racing**
- **Quillan**
- Chambéry
- Bergerac
- Gaillac
- Mazamet

=== Pool 3 ===
- **Toulon**
- **Brive**
- **Auch**
- **Lourdes**
- Valence
- Toulouse Olympique EC
- Lavelanet
- JO Pradéenne

=== Pool 4 ===
- **Dax**
- **La Voulte**
- **Avignon Saint-Saturnin**
- **Tyrosse**
- Tulle
- Fumel Libos
- Aurillac
- Chalon

=== Pool 5 ===
- **Narbonne**
- **Périgueux**
- **Bayonne**
- **Dijon**
- Oloron
- Cahors
- Vienne
- Saint-Junien

=== Pool 6 ===
- **Graulhet**
- **Cognac**
- **Montferrand**
- **Grenoble**
- Montauban
- Saint-Jean-de-Luz
- Stade Bagnérais
- Castelsarrasin

=== Pool 7 ===
- **Pau**
- **Stadoceste**
- **Condom**
- **Mont de Marsan**
- Romans
- Perpignan
- Mauléon
- Albi

=== Pool 8 ===
- **Agen**
- **La Rochelle**
- **Vichy**
- **Lannemezan**
- US Bressane
- Paris Université Club
- Saint-Claude
- Foix

== "Last 32" ==
In bold the clubs qualified for the next round

Team 1	Team 2	Results
Agen	Angoulême	27-3
Stade Beaumontois	La Rochelle	8-3
Auch	Dax	11-3
Racing	Bègles	26-13
La Voulte	Bayonne	9-3
Graulhet	Quillan	13-12
Brive	Avignon Saint-Saturnin	8-6
Béziers	Lannemezan	29-6
Montferrand	Périgueux	18-6
Narbonne	Tyrosse	9-3
Pau	Dijon	24-17
Vichy	Stadoceste	12-9
Grenoble	Toulon	17-12
Cognac	Condom	16-3
Toulouse	Mont de Marsan	41-6
Biarritz	Lourdes	16-15

== "Last 16" ==
In bold the clubs qualified for the next round

Team 1	Team 2	Results
Agen	Stade Beaumontois	16-13
Auch	Racing	8-3
La Voulte	Graulhet	24-3
Brive	Béziers	17-9
Montferrand	Narbonne	12-3
Pau	Vichy	8-0
Grenoble	Cognac	8-6
Toulouse	Biarritz	20-5

== Quarter of finals ==
In bold the clubs qualified for the next round

Team 1	Team 2	Results
**Agen**	Auch	**19-0**
**La Voulte**	Brive	**18-8**
**Montferrand**	Pau	**14-11**
**Grenoble**	Toulose	**12-5**

== Semifinals ==
Team 1	Team 2	Results
**Montferrand**	Grenoble	**11-3**
**La Voulte**	Agen	**9-3**

== Final ==
Teams	**La Voulte** - Montferrand
Score	**3** - 0
Date	17 May 1970
Venue	Stadium Municipal, Toulouse
Referee	Francis Galonnier
Line-up
La Voulte	Jean-Claude Noble, André Laréal, Roger Cance, Nicolas De Grégorio, Michel Savitsky, Paul Digonnet, André Duboué, André Faillon, Lilian Camberabero, Guy Camberabero, Serge Deguerce, Renaud Vialar, Michel Vusec, Lionel Vialar, André Roux
Montferrand	Guy Pujol, Jacques Rougerie, Marcel Thomas, Robert Boisson, Henri Bourdillon, Alain Périn, Yvan Lasserre, Bernard Combeuil, Jacques Pineau, Guy Darbas, Jean-Jacques Desvernois, Paul Cieply, Jean-Claude Jeammes, Louis Coudeyre, Gilbert Prat
Scorers
La Voulte	1 try Renaud Vialar
Montferrand
