= 2000–01 French Rugby Union Championship =

- Countries: France
- Champions: Toulouse (16th title)
- Runners-up: Montferrand
- Relegated: Auch, Aurillac, Brive, Mont-de-Marsan, Périgueux e Grenoble

The 2000–01 French Rugby Union Championship was the top level of French club rugby in 2000–01. The competition was played by 21 teams. It was the last French season before the top level was reorganized into a 16-team league known as Top 16, now known as Top 14.

In the first phase, two pools (one of 10 teams, one of 11) were played. The first 4 of each pool were admitted to the "top 8", the tournament for the title.

The last two of the pool containing 10 teams, and the last three of the other, were relegated directly to the second division. The 8th team in each pool had a play-off to determine the sixth team relegated. Only one club was promoted from the second division in order to reduce the number of clubs for next session to 16.

Toulouse won their 15th title, beating Montferrand in the final

== Preliminary phase ==
=== Pool 1 ===
Home \ Away	AGE	BEZ	BOR	BOU	CAS	MON	PAU	PRG	PRP	STF
Agen		36–19	25–12	32–13	34–16	20–13	29–15	33–8	43–6	25–25
Béziers	26–18		57–7	12–16	24–13	47–29	33–23	56–10	21–25	33–20
Bègles-Bordeaux	26–18	28–25		14–26	27–34	26–17	17–13	35–18	33–10	30–38
Bourgoin	19–16	34–35	56–20		22–19	24–16	34–15	74–8	20–21	22–42
Castres	70–17	25–9	49–22	18–8		21–9	31–18	86–15	28–16	29–0
Mont-de-Marsan	18–19	12–23	23–15	18–14	16–20		26–21	41–11	27–15	20–37
Pau	29–18	30–16	16–35	38–17	18–16	28–3		43–7	22–29	21–6
Périgueux	13–47	34–47	20–21	9–10	12–18	27–22	23–25		20–30	21–26
Perpignan	30–28	26–9	33–15	28–16	23–28	45–17	31–25	83–12		32–33
Stade Français	27–22	28–23	55–19	18–18	34–37	68–10	33–27	79–11	55–9	

Legend: Blue = home team win; Yellow = draw; Red = away team win.

Pos	Team	Pld	W	D	L	PF	PA	PD	Pts	Qualification or relegation
1	Castres	18	14	0	4	558	324	+234	46	Quarters of final
2	Stade Français	18	12	2	4	624	409	+215	44	Quarters of final
3	Perpignan	18	11	0	7	492	452	+40	40	Quarters of final
4	Agen	18	10	1	7	480	385	+95	39	Quarters of final
5	Béziers	18	10	0	8	515	414	+101	38	
6	Bourgoin	18	9	1	8	443	379	+64	37	
7	Bourdeaux-Begles (Note: Bourdeaux-Begles classified 7th for better score in the direct matches with Pau)	18	8	0	10	402	533	−131	34	
8	Pau	18	8	0	10	427	404	+23	34	Relegation play-off
9	Mont-de-Marsan	18	5	0	13	337	481	−144	28	Relegated to second division
10	Périgueux	18	1	0	17	279	776	−497	20	Relegated to second division

=== Pool 2 ===
Home \ Away	AUC	AUR	BIA	BRI	COL	DAX	GRE	ROC	MON	NAR	TOU
Auch		30–11	23–46	21–23	18–36	22–19	11–21	9–24	6–18	9–22	13–56
Aurillac	19–20		18–23	40–34	16–23	22–33	26–25	18–13	33–28	22–28	28–39
Biarritz	50–25	33–18		31–29	48–6	49–10	41–8	37–3	35–35	26–25	23–20
Brive	27–16	18–20	18–43		23–16	28–20	22–12	20–16	9–37	35–39	19–32
Colomiers	22–13	28–30	35–23	12–14		45–27	31–22	38–20	30–10	27–19	20–32
Dax	17–16	45–17	23–12	34–19	21–17		19–16	20–10	9–8	9–21	15–10
Grenoble	27–18	33–19	15–6	29–16	31–23	41–14		17–15	18–24	43–6	15–28
La Rochelle	35–13	27–15	17–21	40–19	24–18	25–19	21–8		26–36	49–42	19–18
Montferrand	66–17	22–43	37–19	46–35	16–5	37–10	30–18	67–7		32–27	28–15
Narbonne	44–10	31–25	32–20	9–12	19–21	49–33	59–17	56–21	18–27		25–31
Toulouse	39–10	44–24	11–8	50–19	24–21	42–22	50–12	46–22	24–29	50–8	

Legend: Blue = home team win; Yellow = draw; Red = away team win.

Pos	Team	Pld	W	D	L	PF	PA	PD	Pts	Qualification or relegation
1	Montferrand	20	15	1	4	633	404	+229	51	Quarters of final
2	Toulouse	20	15	0	5	661	380	+281	50	Quarters of final
3	Biarritz	20	13	1	6	594	408	+186	47	Quarters of final
4	Colomiers (Note: Colomiers classified 4th for better score in the direct matches with Narbonne and Dax)	20	10	0	10	474	450	+24	40	Quarters of final
5	Narbonne	20	10	0	10	579	519	+60	40	
6	Dax	20	10	0	10	419	506	−87	40	
7	La Rochelle (Note: La Rochelle classified 7th for better score in the direct matches with Grenoble)	20	9	0	11	434	537	−103	38	
8	Grenoble	20	9	0	11	428	479	−51	38	Relegation play-off
9	Brive	20	8	0	12	439	563	−124	36	Relegated to second division
10	Aurillac	20	7	0	13	464	577	−113	34	Relegated to second division
11	Auch	20	3	0	17	320	615	−295	26	Relegated to second division

== Quarters of final ==
QUARTERS OF FINAL
25 May	Castres	-	Colomiers	37–26
25 May	Toulouse	-	Perpignan	20–15
25 May	Stade Français	-	Biarritz	19–35
25 May	Montferrand	-	Agen	33–21

== Semifinals ==
SEMIFINALS
2 jun.	Castres	-	Toulouse	21–32	Stadium, Toulouse
2 jun.	Biarritz	-	Montferrand	9–16	Stade Gerland, Lyon

== Final ==
9 June 2001

Toulouse	34 – 22	Montferrand
Try: Marfaing; Con: Marfaing; Pen: Michalak (4); Marfaing (2); Drop: Delaigue (3)		Try: Audebert; Con: Merceron; Pen: Merceron (5)

Stade de France, Saint-Denis
Referee: Gérard Borréani

FB	15	(France) Nicolas Jeanjean
RW	14	(France) Xavier Garbajosa
OC	13	(France) Cédric Desbrosse	(substituted off) 76'
IC	12	(France) Clément Poitrenaud	(substituted off) 80'
LW	11	(France) Michel Marfaing
FH	10	(France) Yann Delaigue
SH	9	(France) Frédéric Michalak
N8	8	(France) Fabien Pelous (c)
OF	7	(France) Christian Labit	(substituted off) 76'
BF	6	(France) Jean Bouilhou
RL	5	(France) David Gérard	(substituted off) 73'
LL	4	(France) Hugues Miorin	(substituted off) 61'
TP	3	(France) Franck Tournaire
HK	2	(France) Yannick Bru
LP	1	(France) Christian Califano	(substituted off) 58'
Substitutions:
PR	16	(France) Cédric Soulette	(substituted in) 58'
LK	17	(France) Franck Belot	(substituted in) 73'
FL	18	(France) Didier Lacroix	(substituted in) 76'
N8	19	(France) Sylvain Dispagne	(substituted in) 61'
SH	20	(France) Jérôme Cazalbou
FH	21	(France) Alain Penaud	(substituted in) 80'
FB	22	(France) Stéphane Ougier	(substituted in) 76'
Coach:
(France) Guy Novès

FB	15	(France) Jimmy Marlu
RW	14	(France) Aurélien Rougerie	(substituted off) 80+6'
OC	13	(Tonga) Johnny Ngauamo	(substituted off) 55'
IC	12	(France) Nicolas Nadau
LW	11	(France) David Bory
FH	10	(France) Gérald Merceron
SH	9	(Italy) Alessandro Troncon
N8	8	(South Africa) Selborne Boome
OF	7	(France) Olivier Magne
BF	6	(France) Alexandre Audebert
RL	5	(France) Éric Lecomte (c)
LL	4	(France) David Barrier	(substituted off) 67'
TP	3	(France) Alessio Galasso
HK	2	(France) Yves Pedrosa	(substituted off) 72'
LP	1	(France) Abraham Tolofua	(substituted off) 77'
Substitutions:
HK	16	(Australia) Marco Caputo	(substituted in) 72'
PR	17	(Samoa) Brendan Reidy	(substituted in) 77'
FL	18	(Czech Republic) Jan Macháček	(substituted in) 67'
FL	19	(France) Christophe Dongieu
SH	20	(United States) Kevin Dalzell
FH	21	(France) Éric Nicol	(substituted in) 80+6'
FB	22	(France) Sébastien Viars	(substituted in) 55'
Coach:
(France) Christophe Mombet

== Relegation play-off ==
25 May	Pau	-	FC Grenoble	33 – 21 o.t.
