= Nicolas Onuțu =

Romania international rugby union player

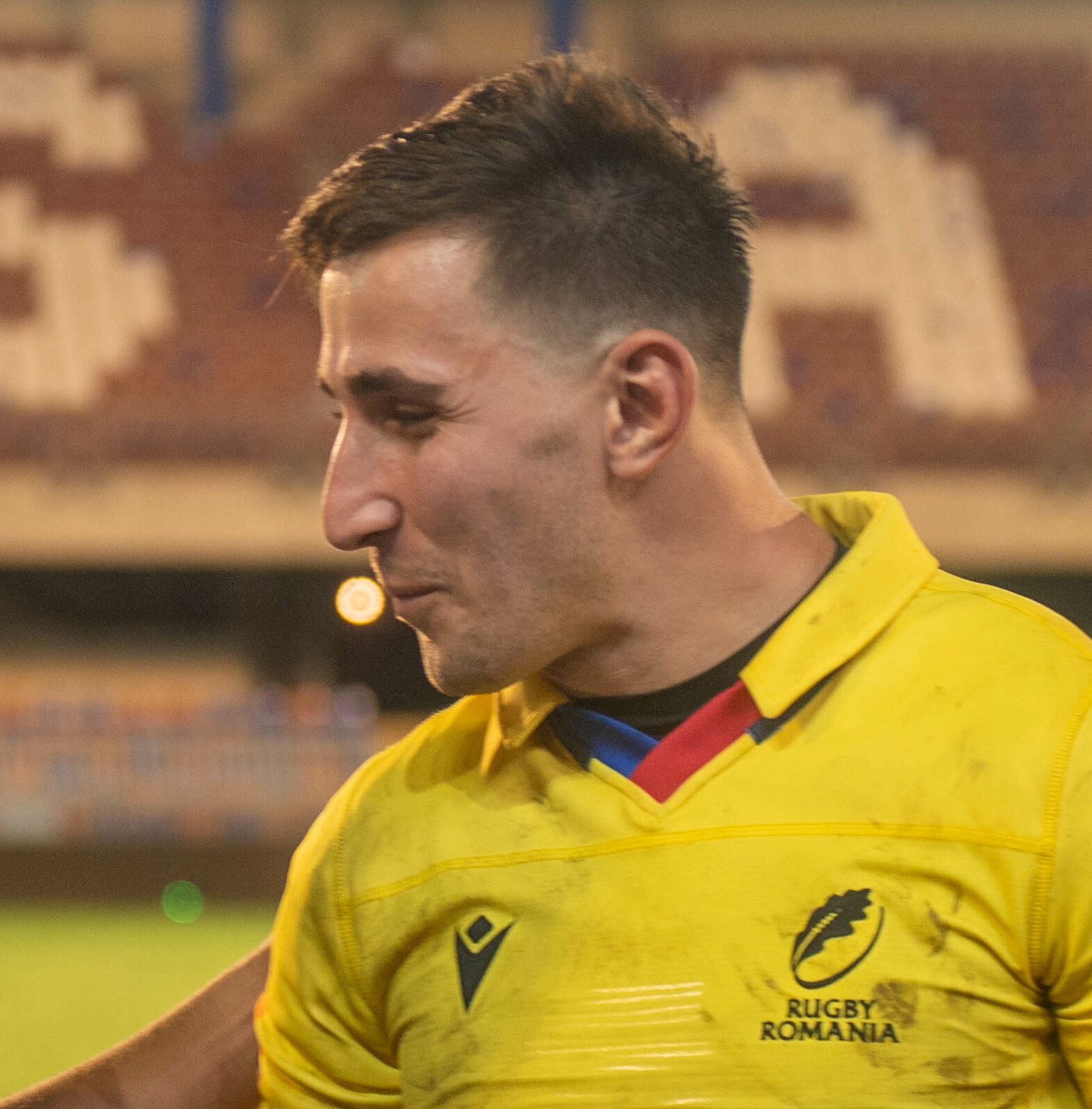
- Onuțu with Romania in 2023
- Full name: Nicolas Onuțu
- Born: 27 December 1995 (age 30) Guilherand-Granges, France
- Height: 1.85 m (6 ft 1 in)
- Weight: 86 kg (13 st 8 lb; 190 lb)
- University: Joseph Fourier University
- Notable relative(s): Viorel Onuțu (father); Julien Onuțu (brother)

Rugby union career
- Position: Wing
- Current team: CS Annonay
Youth career
- Valence Sportif
Senior career
Years	Team	Apps	(Points)
2015–16	ROC La Voulte-Valence	13	(15)
2016–17	SC Royannais		
2017–18	CS Vienne	14	(20)
2018–19	CSM București	10	(25)
2019–23	CS Vienne	37	(55)
2023–	CS Annonay		
International career
Years	Team	Apps	(Points)
2016–	Romania	21	(5)

Nicolas Onuțu (born 27 December 1995 in Guilherand-Granges, Ardèche) is a French-born Romanian professional rugby union player who currently plays for the French club CS Annonay.

== Club career ==
Onuțu started playing rugby as a youth for the French club Valence Sportif. In 2015, he was signed by Fédérale 1 club ROC La Voulte-Valence, playing there for a year. In 2016, he moved to SC Royannais, and in 2017, he joined Fédérale 2 club CS Vienne. In 2018, he was signed by Romanian SuperLiga side CSM București.

== International career ==
Onuțu made his international debut at the 2016 World Rugby Nations Cup in a match against the Welwitschias.

== Personal life ==
His father, Viorel, a former Grivița București and Romanian international player, left communist Romania in 1971 and settled in France. There, he continued his career, playing for La Voulte Sportif, Grenoble, and Valence Sportif before officially retiring in 1978. His older brother, Julien, is also a rugby union player.
