= Bernard Chevallier =

Bernard Chevallier may refer to:

- Bernard Chevallier (equestrian)
- Bernard Chevallier (rugby union)
