= List of Super Rugby stadiums =

The following is a list of main stadiums used in the international rugby union competition, Super Rugby, in which teams from Australia, Fiji, New Zealand and the Pacific Islands participate. Stadiums are current as of ahead of 2027 Super Rugby Pacific season.

* Italics denote a former use of a Primary or Secondary stadium.

== 2027 Primary stadiums ==
Stadium	Image	Team	Country	City	Capacity
Suncorp Stadium		Drua; Reds; Sunwolves	Australia	Brisbane	52,500
Eden Park		Blues; Moana Pasifika	New Zealand	Auckland	50,000
Allianz Stadium		Waratahs	Australia	Sydney	42,500
Hnry Stadium		Hurricanes	New Zealand	Wellington	34,500
Forsyth Barr Stadium		Blues; Chiefs; Crusaders; Highlanders; Hurricanes	New Zealand	Dunedin	30,748
One NZ Stadium		Blues; Chiefs; Crusaders; Highlanders; Hurricanes; Moana Pasifika	New Zealand	Christchurch	30,000
FMG Stadium Waikato		Chiefs	New Zealand	Hamilton	25,800
GIO Stadium		Brumbies	Australia	Canberra	25,011
HBF Park		Force	Australia	Perth	20,500
HFC Bank Stadium		Drua; Highlanders	Fiji	Suva	15,446
Four R Stadium		Drua	Fiji	Ba	13,500
Churchill Park		Drua	Fiji	Lautoka	10,000

== Secondary Stadiums ==
Stadium	Image	Team	Country	City	Capacity
Stadium Taranaki		Chiefs; Hurricanes	New Zealand	New Plymouth	30,345
McLean Park		Crusaders; Hurricanes	New Zealand	Napier	19,700
Rugby Park		Highlanders	New Zealand	Invercargill	18,000
Corroboree Group Oval		Brumbies	Australia	Canberra	15,000

== Former stadiums ==
The following list includes all former Super Rugby stadiums used from the 1996 season to the end of the 2026 season. The list does not include any stadium currently used as a primary or secondary stadium.

Country	Stadium	City	Team(s)	Capacity
Argentina	José Amalfitani Stadium	Buenos Aires	Jaguares	49,540
Australia	ANZ Stadium, Sydney	Sydney	Waratahs	82,500
Australia	Sydney Cricket Ground	Sydney	Waratahs	48,601
Australia	Allianz Stadium	Sydney	Waratahs	44,000
Australia	Subiaco Oval	Perth	Force	43,082
Australia	McDonald Jones Stadium	Newcastle	Rebels; Waratahs	33,000
Australia	CommBank Stadium	Parramatta	Drua; Waratahs	30,000
Australia	AAMI Park	Melbourne	Blues; Chiefs; Crusaders; Drua; Force; Highlanders; Hurricanes; Moana Pasifika; Rebels	29,500
Australia	Cbus Super Stadium	Robina	Drua; Force	27,400
Australia	Willows Sports Complex	Townsville	Reds	26,500
Australia	Queensland Country Bank Stadium	Townsville	Reds	25,000
Australia	Brookvale Oval	Sydney	Rebels; Waratahs	23,000
Australia	WIN Stadium	Wollongong	Sunwolves; Waratahs	23,000
Australia	Leichhardt Oval	Sydney	Chiefs; Drua; Force; Highlanders; Rebels; Waratahs	20,000
Australia	Ballymore	Herston	Reds	18,000
Australia	HIF Health Insurance Oval	Joondalup	Force	16,000
Australia	Sunshine Coast Stadium	Kawana Waters	Drua	12,000
Australia	Mars Stadium	Ballarat	Rebels	11,000
England	Twickenham Stadium	London	Crusaders	82,000
Hong Kong	Mong Kok Stadium	Hong Kong	Sunwolves	6,684
Japan	Prince Chichibu Memorial Stadium	Tokyo	Sunwolves	27,188
Japan	Level5 Stadium	Fukuoka	Sunwolves	21,562
New Zealand	Athletic Park	Wellington	Hurricanes	39,000
New Zealand	AMI Stadium	Christchurch	Crusaders	38,628
New Zealand	Go Media Stadium	Auckland	Moana Pasifika	30,000
New Zealand	Semenoff Stadium	Whangārei	Blues; Chiefs; Moana Pasifika	30,000
New Zealand	Carisbrook	Dunedin	Highlanders	29,000
New Zealand	Rotorua International Stadium	Rotorua	Chiefs; Moana Pasifika	26,000
New Zealand	Owen Delany Park	Taupō	Chiefs	20,000
New Zealand	Baypark Stadium	Mount Maunganui	Chiefs	19,800
New Zealand	Queenstown Events Centre	Queenstown	Highlanders	19,000
New Zealand	Trafalgar Park	Nelson	Crusaders	18,000
New Zealand	Apollo Projects Stadium	Christchurch	Crusaders	17,104
New Zealand	Central Energy Trust Arena	Palmerston North	Highlanders; Hurricanes	15,000
New Zealand	North Harbour Stadium	Albany	Blues; Chiefs; Moana Pasifika	14,000
New Zealand	Fraser Park	Timaru	Crusaders	12,500
New Zealand	Navigation Homes Stadium	Pukekohe	Blues; Chiefs; Moana Pasifika	12,000
New Zealand	Bay Oval	Mount Maunganui	Chiefs	10,000
New Zealand	Tauranga Domain	Tauranga	Chiefs	5,000
New Zealand	Wakatipu Rugby Club	Queenstown	Chiefs	1,000
Samoa	Apia Park	Apia	Blues; Moana Pasifika	12,000
Singapore	National Stadium	Singapore	Sunwolves	55,000
South Africa	Emirates Airline Park	Johannesburg	Cats; Lions	62,567
South Africa	Jonsson Kings Park	Durban	Sharks	52,000
South Africa	DHL Newlands	Cape Town	Stormers	51,900
South Africa	Loftus Versfeld	Pretoria	Bulls	51,762
South Africa	Nelson Mandela Bay Stadium	Gqeberha	Southern Kings	46,000
South Africa	Toyota Stadium	Bloemfontein	Cats; Cheetahs	46,000
South Africa	Mbombela Stadium	Mbombela	Pumas	40,929
South Africa	Orlando Stadium	Soweto	Bulls	37,139
South Africa	Boet Erasmus Stadium	Port Elizabeth	Sharks	33,852
South Africa	Puma Stadium	Witbank	Bulls	20,000
South Africa	Buffalo City Stadium	East London	Sharks	16,000
South Africa	Boland Stadium	Wellington	Stormers	11,000
South Africa	Tafel Lager Park	Kimberley	Cheetahs; Griquas	11,000
South Africa	North West Stadium	Welkom	Cheetahs	8,500
South Africa	Outeniqua Park	George	Stormers	7,500
South Africa	Bosman Stadium	Brakpan	Bulls	5,000
Tonga	Teufaiva Sport Stadium	Nukuʻalofa	Moana Pasifika	10,000

== See also ==
- List of Australian rugby union stadiums by capacity
- List of rugby union stadiums by capacity
- List of rugby union stadiums in France
- List of English rugby union stadiums by capacity
