= List of rugby union stadiums in France =

The following is a list of rugby union stadiums in France, ordered by capacity. Currently all stadiums with a capacity of 10,000 or more which are the regular home venue of a club or national team, or are the regular host of major national or international rugby events, are included.

== Existing stadiums ==
#	Image	Stadium	Capacity	City	Region	Home team	Opened
1		Stade de France	81,338	Saint-Denis	Île-de-France	France national rugby union team (most matches); Stade Français (some matches); Racing 92 (some matches)	1998
2		Stade Vélodrome	67,000	Marseille	Provence-Alpes-Côte d'Azur	France national team (some matches); RC Toulonnais (some matches)	1937
3		Allianz Riviera	35,624	Nice	Provence-Alpes-Côte d'Azur	RC Toulonnais (some matches)	2013
4		Stadium Municipal	35,575	Toulouse	Occitanie	Stade Toulousain (some matches)	1937
5		Stade Gerland	35,029	Lyon	Auvergne-Rhône-Alpes	Lyon OU	1926
6		Stade Chaban-Delmas	34,462	Bordeaux	Nouvelle-Aquitaine	Union Bordeaux Bègles	1938
7		Paris La Défense Arena	30,680	Nanterre	Île-de-France	Racing 92	2017
8		Stade Guy Boniface	22,000	Mont-de-Marsan	Nouvelle-Aquitaine	Stade Montois	1965
9		Stade des Alpes	20,068	Grenoble	Auvergne-Rhône-Alpes	FC Grenoble	2008
10		Stade Jean-Bouin	19,904	Paris	Île-de-France	Stade Français; France Sevens (tournament)	1925
11		Stade Ernest-Wallon	19,500	Toulouse	Occitanie	Stade Toulousain	1982
12		Stade Sébastien Charléty	19,151	Paris	Île-de-France	Paris Université Club	1939
13		Stade de la Méditerranée	18,555	Béziers	Occitanie	AS Béziers Hérault	1990
14		Stade Marcel-Michelin	18,030	Clermont-Ferrand	Auvergne-Rhône-Alpes	ASM Clermont Auvergne	1911
15		Stade Jean Dauger	16,934	Bayonne	Nouvelle-Aquitaine	Aviron Bayonnais	1937
16		Stade Marcel-Deflandre	16,700	La Rochelle	Nouvelle-Aquitaine	Stade Rochelais	1926
17		Stade Maurice Trélut	16,400	Tarbes	Midi-Pyrénées	Stado Tarbes Pyrénées Rugby	1969
18		Stade Maurice Boyau	16,170	Dax	Nouvelle-Aquitaine	US Dax	1958
19		Stade Amédée-Domenech	16,000	Brive-la-Gaillarde	Nouvelle-Aquitaine	CA Brive	1921
20		Altrad Stadium	15,697	Montpellier	Occitanie	Montpellier Hérault	2007
21		Stade Mayol	15,700	Toulon	Provence-Alpes-Côte d'Azur	RC Toulonnais	1920
22		Parc des Sports Aguiléra	15,000	Biarritz	Nouvelle-Aquitaine	Biarritz Olympique	1905
23		Stade Aimé Giral	14,593	Perpignan	Occitanie	USA Perpignan	1940
24		Stade Georges Pompidou	14,380	Valence	Auvergne-Rhône-Alpes	ROC La Voulte-Valence	1974
25		Stade Armandie	14,000	Agen	Nouvelle-Aquitaine	SU Agen	1921
26		Stade du Hameau	13,966	Pau	Nouvelle-Aquitaine	Section Paloise	
27		Stadium Municipal d'Albi	13,058	Albi	Occitanie	SC Albi	1962
28		Stade Sapiac	12,600	Montauban	Occitanie	US Montauban	1907
29		Stade Pierre-Fabre	12,500	Castres	Occitanie	Castres Olympique	1907
30		Stade Dominique Duvauchelle	12,050	Créteil	Île-de-France	US Créteil-Lusitanos	1983
31		Parc des Sports Et de l'Amitié	12,000	Narbonne	Occitanie	RC Narbonne	1979
32		Stade Lesdiguières	11,900	Grenoble	Auvergne-Rhône-Alpes	FC Grenoble (some matches and training)	1968
33		Stade Michel Bendichou	11,430	Colomiers	Occitanie	US Colomiers	
34		Stade Gabriel Montpied	10,607	Clermont-Ferrand	Auvergne-Rhône-Alpes	France Women's Sevens (tournament)	1995
35		Stade Pierre Rajon	10,000	Bourgoin-Jallieu	Auvergne-Rhône-Alpes	CS Bourgoin-Jallieu	
36		Stade Francis-Rongiéras	10,000	Périgueux	Nouvelle-Aquitaine	CA Périgueux	1976
37		Stade Albert Domec	10,000	Carcassonne	Occitanie	US Carcassonne	1899

== See also ==
- List of rugby union stadiums by capacity
- List of football stadiums in France
- List of European stadiums by capacity
- Lists of stadiums
