= List of English rugby union stadiums by capacity =

The following is a list of rugby union stadiums in England. The stadiums are organised by capacity, which is the maximum number of spectators the stadium can normally accommodate. Capacities are standard total capacity, including seats and any standing areas, and excluding any temporary seating. All stadiums with a capacity of 3,000 or more are included and host Premiership, RFU Championship and National League 1 games for the 2016–17 season. Some of the stadiums below host other sports and events in addition to rugby union. Stadiums which have only hosted rugby union games for one-off occasions, such as the King Power Stadium and Wembley Stadium, have been omitted from the list.

== National Stadium ==
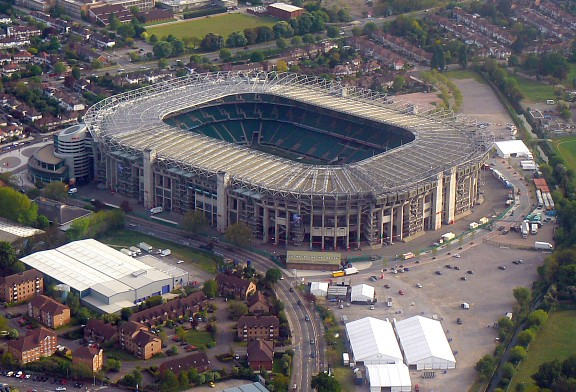
Twickenham Stadium

Twickenham Stadium is the national rugby union stadium of England, being the home ground of the England national team. Twickenham also hosts the Final of the Premiership Playoffs with the winner being crowned Champions. Additionally Twickenham hosts special one-off home games for some of the Premiership clubs, including Saracens, Harlequins and Bath.

Stadium	Capacity	Location	Rugby Union Tenants	Other Tenants
Twickenham Stadium	82,000	London	England	Saracens, Harlequins, Bath

== Premiership Rugby ==
Below is a list of rugby union stadiums used in Premiership Rugby during the 2023-2024 season. There are 10 stadiums in total, with 10 of them representing the permanent home ground of each Premiership side.

Stadium	Capacity	Location	Rugby Union Tenants	Other Tenants
Ashton Gate	27,000	Bristol	Bristol	Bristol City
Welford Road	25,849	Leicester	Leicester Tigers	
Kingsholm Stadium	16,115	Gloucester	Gloucester	
Franklin's Gardens	15,249	Northampton	Northampton Saints	
Twickenham Stoop	14,816	London	Harlequins	
Recreation Ground	14,500	Bath	Bath	
Sandy Park	15,600	Exeter	Exeter Chiefs	
AJ Bell Stadium	12,000	Salford	Sale Sharks	Salford Red Devils
Kingston Park	10,200	Newcastle	Newcastle Red Bulls	Newcastle Thunder
StoneX Stadium	10,500	London	Saracens	

== RFU Championship and National League 1 ==
Below is a list of rugby union stadiums ordered by capacity from the RFU Championship and National League 1, which are the 2nd and 3rd tiers in the English Rugby Union Pyramid.

Stadium	Capacity	Location	Rugby Union Tenants	League
The Darlington Arena	25,000	Darlington	Darlington Mowden Park	National League 1
Sixways Stadium	11,500	Worcester	Worcester Warriors	RFU Championship
The Brickfields	8,500	Plymouth	Plymouth Albion	National League 1
Goldington Road	6,000	Bedford	Bedford Blues	RFU Championship
Billesley Common	5,000	Birmingham	Birmingham Moseley	National League 1
Castle Park	5,000	Doncaster	Doncaster Knights	RFU Championship
St. Peter	5,000	Saint Peter	Jersey Reds	RFU Championship
Trailfinders Sports Ground	5,000	London	Ealing Trailfinders	RFU Championship
Athletic Ground	4,500	London	London Scottish, Richmond	RFU Championship
Mennaye Field	4,000	Penzance	Cornish Pirates	RFU Championship
Butts Park Arena	4,000	Coventry	Coventry	RFU Championship
Molesey Road	3,500	Hersham	Esher	National League 1
Lady Bay Sports Ground	3,000	Nottingham	Nottingham	RFU Championship
Dillingham Park	3,000	Ampthill	Ampthill	RFU Championship
Loughborough University Stadium	3,000	Loughborough	Loughborough Students	National League 1
Hartpury College Stadium	2,000	Hartpury	Hartpury University	RFU Championship
The Sycamores	1,500	Bramhope	Leeds Tykes	National League 1

== See also ==
- List of rugby union stadiums by capacity
- List of Australian rugby union stadiums by capacity
- List of rugby union stadiums in France
- List of Super Rugby stadiums
- List of rugby league stadiums by capacity
