= 1936–37 French Rugby Union Championship =

- Countries: France
- Champions: Vienne
- Runners-up: Montferrand

The 1936–37 French Rugby Union Championship was won by Vienne that beat the Montferrand in the final.

The tournament was played by 40 clubs divided in eight pools of five clubs. At the second round were admitted the first two of each pool.

== Context ==
The 1937 International Championship was won by Ireland, the France was excluded.

France won the second FIRA Tournament in Paris.

== Semifinals ==
apr. 1937	Vienne	-	Lyon OU	12 - 4
apr. 1937	Montferrand	-	Perpignan	3 - 0

== Final ==
Teams	Vienne - Montferrand
Score	13-7
Date	2 May 1937
Venue	Stade des Ponts Jumeaux, Toulouse
Referee	Lucien Barbe
Line-up
Vienne	Benvenuto Sella, Louis Samuel, Jean Delhom, Gabriel Comte, Roland Renz, Germain Daurès, Louis Pallin, Elie Théau, Antoine Laurent, René Vanthier, Jacques Rival, Georges Pepy, Marcel Deygas, Emmanuel Barry, André Puyo
Montferrand	René Lombarteix, Roger Paul, Elie Corporon, Jean-Baptiste Julien, Etienne Dupouy, Michel Monnet, Lucien Cognet, Aimé Rochon, Pierre Thiers, Jean Chassagne, Lucien Plumasson, Louis Courtadon, Joseph Pagès, Marius Bellot, Maurice Savy
Scorers
Vienne	3tries Deygas, Vanthier, Comte; 2 conversions de Rival
Montferrand	1 penalty de Thiers; 1 drop de Chassagne
