= 1935–36 French Rugby Union Championship =

- Countries: France
- Champions: Narbonne
- Runners-up: Montferrand

The 1935–36 French Rugby Union Championship was won by Narbonne that beat the Montferrand in the final.

The tournament was played by 40 clubs divided in eight pools of five clubs. At the second round were admitted the first two of each pool.

== Context ==
The 1936 International Championship was won by Wales, the France was excluded.

France won the FIRA Tournament in Berlin.

== Semifinals ==
apr. 1936	Narbonne	-	Perpignan	3 - 0
apr. 1935	Montferrand	-	Bayonne	10 - 3

== Final ==
Teams	Narbonne - Montferrand
Score	6-3
Date	10 May 1936
Venue	Stade des Ponts Jumeaux, Toulouse
Referee	Paul Faur
Line-up
Narbonne	Fernand Toujas, Roger Bricchi, Pierre Escaffre, Marcellin Amiel, Joseph Arbona, Eugène Boyer, Albert Sangayrac, Alexandre Iché, François Lombard, Marcel Raynaud, Francis Vals, Emile Clottes, Raymond Ponsaillé, Edouard Chavanon, Pierre Bouichou
Montferrand	Elie Corporon, Roger Paul, Raoul Fradet, Etienne Dupouy, Jean-Baptiste Julien, Aimé Rochon, Lucien Cognet, François Punsola, Pierre Thiers, Jean Chassagne, Marius Bellot, Maurice Savy, Louis Courtadon, Lucien Plumasson, André Vesvre
Scorers
Narbonne	1 try Vals; 1 penalty Ponsaillé
Montferrand	1 penalty Thiers
