= Nicolas Jeanjean =

French rugby union player

- Born: 13 May 1981 (age 45) Montpellier, France
- Height: 1.90 m (6 ft 3 in)
- Weight: 96 kg (15 st 2 lb)
- Occupation: Fitness coach

Rugby union career
- Position(s): Wing, Full-back
Senior career
Years	Team	Apps	(Points)
2001–2006	Toulouse	77	(68)
2006–2009	Stade Français	35	(15)
2009–2012	CA Brive	24	(40)
International career
Years	Team	Apps	(Points)
2001–2002	France	9	(10)

Nicolas Jeanjean (born 13 March 1981) is a French former professional rugby union player, who played as a wing or full-back for Toulouse, Stade Français and Brive in the Top 14 as well as for the France national team. He made his debut for France on 16 June 2001 against South Africa and currently works with his former national selection as a fitness coach.

== Honours ==
- Grand Slam: 2002
- Top 14: 2000–01 with Stade Toulousain, 2006–07 with Stade Français
