= Bernard Chevallier (rugby union) =

France international rugby union player (1925–2018)

- Born: 7 December 1925 Rougnat, Creuse, France
- Died: 11 July 2018 (aged 92)
- Height: 6 ft 2 in (188 cm)
- Weight: 235 lb (107 kg)

Rugby union career
- Position: Lock
International career
| Years | Team | Apps | (Points) |
| 1952–57 | France | 26 | (0) |

Bernard Chevallier (7 December 1925 – 11 July 2018) was a French international rugby union player.

Born in Rougnat, Creuse, Chevallier was a sizeable lock forward and started his career in Moulin, before moving to AS Montferrand in 1950, which is where he would spend the next 15 seasons.

Chevallier was capped 26 times for France, debuting against Scotland at Murrayfield in the 1952 Five Nations. He was part of two successful Five Nations campaigns during his career and played in their historic win over the All Blacks in 1954.

Outside of rugby, Chevallier worked for the railway company SNCF and was a long time resident of Clermont-Ferrand.

== See also ==
- List of France national rugby union players
