= Ville-di-Pietrabugno =

- Commune
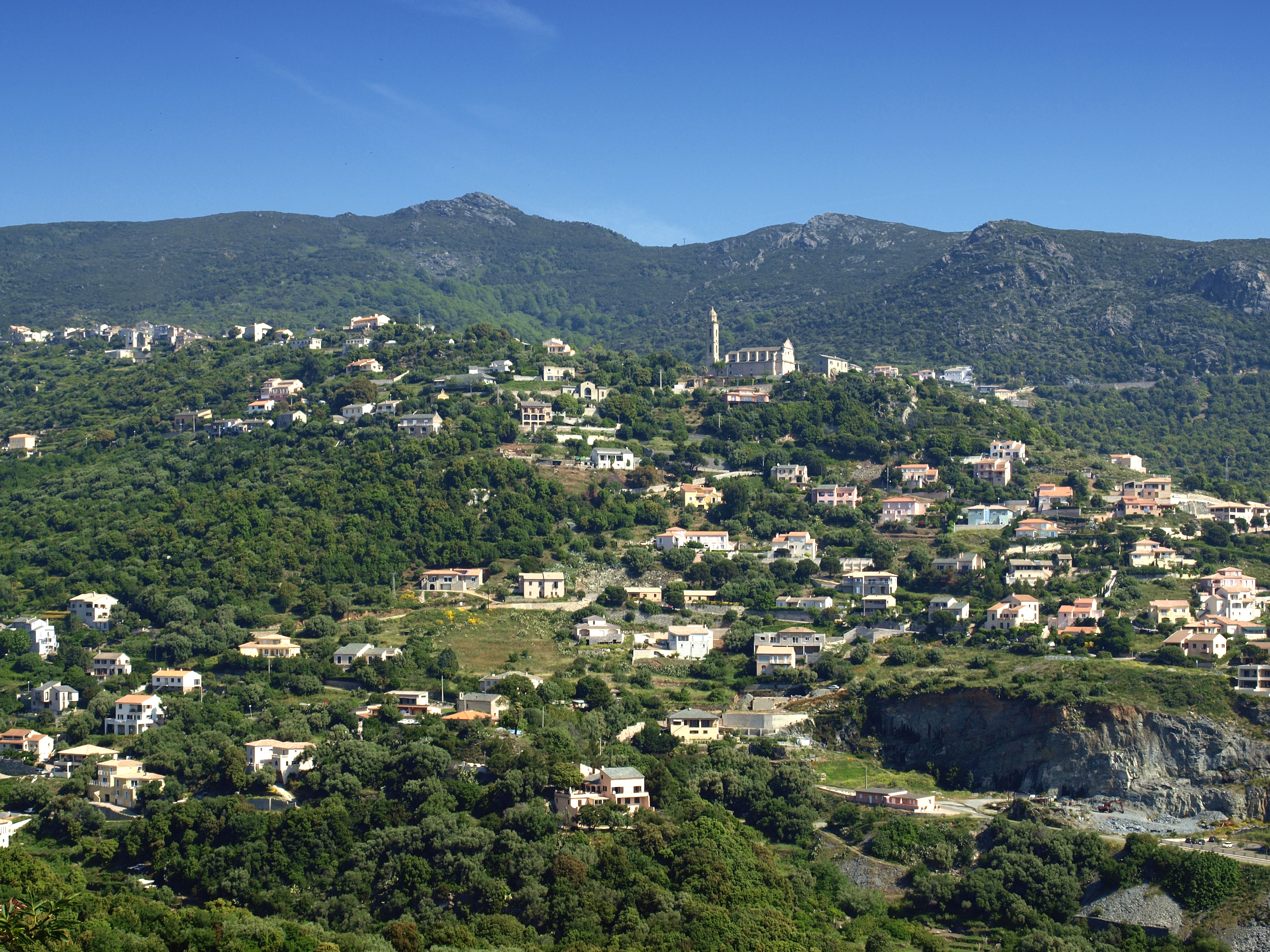
- The church of Santa Lucia and the surrounding buildings, in Ville-di-Pietrabugno
- Location of Ville-di-Pietrabugno
- Location within France Location within Corsica
- Coordinates: 42°42′51″N 9°25′54″E
- Country: France
- Region: Corsica
- Department: Haute-Corse
- Arrondissement: Bastia
- Canton: Bastia-1
- Intercommunality: CA Bastia

Government
  - Mayor (2020–2026): Michel Rossi
- Area^{1}: 7.53 km^{2} (2.91 sq mi)
- Elevation: 339 m (1,112 ft)
- Highest elevation: 900 m (3,000 ft)
- Lowest elevation: 0 m (0 ft)
- Population (2023): 3,215
  - Density: 427/km^{2} (1,110/sq mi)
- Time zone: UTC+01:00 (CET)
  - Summer (DST): UTC+02:00 (CEST)
- INSEE/Postal code: 2B353 /20200
- ^{1} French Land Register data, which excludes lakes, ponds, glaciers > 1 km^{2} (0.386 sq mi or 247 acres) and river estuaries.

Ville-di-Pietrabugno (French pronunciation: [vile di pjɛtʁabuɲo]; Corsican: E Ville di Petrabugnu) is a commune in the Haute-Corse department of France on the island of Corsica.

== Population ==
Historical population
Year	Pop.	±% p.a.
1968	1,562	—
1975	1,735	+1.51%
1982	2,827	+7.22%
1990	2,950	+0.53%
1999	2,950	+0.00%
2007	3,075	+0.52%
2012	3,559	+2.97%
2017	3,323	−1.36%
2023	3,215	−0.55%
Source: INSEE

== See also ==
- Tour de Toga
- Communes of the Haute-Corse department
