= Torra di Toga =

Genoese coastal defence tower in Corsica

Tower of Toga
- Torra di Toga (Corsican)
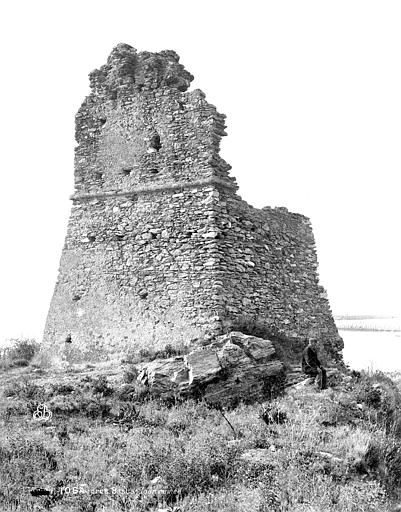

- Location within Corsica
- 42°42′35″N 9°27′15″E

History
- Built: Second half of 16th century

The Tower of Toga or Tower of Pietrabugno (Corsican: Torra di Toga) was a Genoese tower located in the commune of Ville-di-Pietrabugno on the east coast of Cap Corse on the Corsica. The tower stood 1.5 kilometres (0.93 mi) north of the centre of the town of Bastia. The ruins were demolished in the 20th century.

The tower was one of a series of defences constructed by the Republic of Genoa between 1530 and 1620 to stem the attacks by Barbary pirates.

== See also ==
- List of Genoese towers in Corsica
