= Gérard Rousset (rugby union) =

France international rugby union player

- Born: 21 January 1953 (age 73) Bourg-lès-Valence, France
- Height: 6 ft 2 in (188 cm)
- Weight: 207 lb (94 kg)

Rugby union career
- Position: Back-row
International career
Years	Team	Apps	(Points)
1975–76	France	2	(4)

Gérard Rousset (born 21 January 1953) is a French former international rugby union player.

Born in Bourg-lès-Valence, Rousset was a back row forward mainly associated with Valence Sportif, but gained his France call up during a short stint with AS Béziers. He debuted for France against the Springboks at Bloemfontein in 1975 and the following year was capped a second time on a tour of the United States, playing an international match in Chicago.

Rousset operates the Victor Hugo café in Valence.

== See also ==
- List of France national rugby union players
