= Rougnat =

Commune in Nouvelle-Aquitaine, France

- Commune
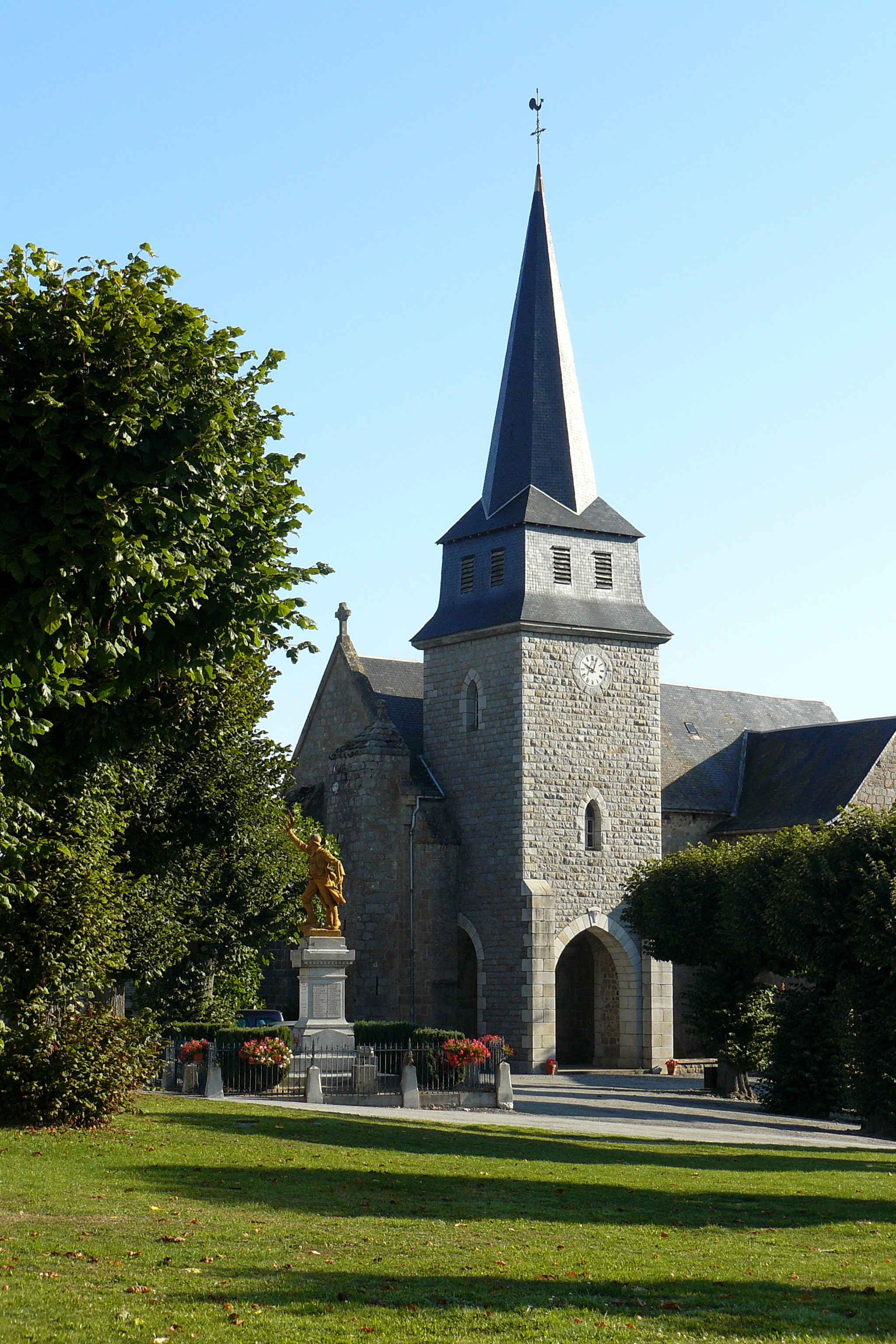
- The church in Rougnat

- Coat of arms
- Location of Rougnat
- Location within France Location within Nouvelle-Aquitaine
- Coordinates: 46°03′17″N 2°30′07″E
- Country: France
- Region: Nouvelle-Aquitaine
- Department: Creuse
- Arrondissement: Aubusson
- Canton: Auzances
- Intercommunality: CC Marche et Combraille en Aquitaine

Government
  - Mayor (2020–2026): Pierre Désarménien
- Area^{1}: 41.01 km^{2} (15.83 sq mi)
- Elevation: 550 m (1,800 ft)
- Highest elevation: 669 m (2,195 ft)
- Lowest elevation: 430 m (1,410 ft)
- Population (2023): 471
  - Density: 11.5/km^{2} (29.7/sq mi)
- Time zone: UTC+01:00 (CET)
  - Summer (DST): UTC+02:00 (CEST)
- INSEE/Postal code: 23164 /23700
- ^{1} French Land Register data, which excludes lakes, ponds, glaciers > 1 km^{2} (0.386 sq mi or 247 acres) and river estuaries.

Rougnat (French pronunciation: [ʁuɲa]; Occitan: Ronhac) is a commune in the Creuse department in the Nouvelle-Aquitaine region in central France.

== Geography ==
A large area of forestry, farming and lakes comprising the village and several hamlets situated by the banks of the river Cher, some 17 miles (27 km) northeast of Aubusson on the D996 and the D4 roads.

== Population ==
Historical population
Year	Pop.	±% p.a.
1968	856	—
1975	764	−1.61%
1982	676	−1.73%
1990	631	−0.86%
1999	541	−1.70%
2007	569	+0.63%
2012	524	−1.63%
2017	494	−1.17%
2023	471	−0.79%
Source: INSEE

== Sights ==
- The church of St. Laurent, dating from the twelfth century.
- A dolmen.
- Vestiges of a Roman villa at Cujasseix.
- The fifteenth-century Bodeau castle.

== See also ==
- Communes of the Creuse department
