= Alessio Galasso =

France international rugby union player (born 1974)

- Born: 29 May 1974 (age 52) Dakar, Senegal
- Height: 1.80 m (5 ft 11 in)
- Weight: 103 kg (227 lb)

Rugby union career
- Position: Loosehead prop
Senior career
Years	Team	Apps	(Points)
1997-2000	Toulon		
2000-2002	Montferrand		
2002-2003	Bath Rugby		
2003-2005	Castres		
2005-2007	SU Agen		
2007-2009	Toulon		
International career
Years	Team	Apps	(Points)
2000-2001	France	2	(2)

Alessio Galasso (born 29 May 1974) is a French rugby player.

Galasso was born in Dakar, Senegal. He played for Toulon, Montferrand, Bath Rugby, Castres and SU Agen at prop. He earned his first cap with the French national team on 7 April 2001 against Romania.

== Honour ==
- Coupe de France 2001 with AS Montferrand
- Challenge Yves du Manoir 2001 with AS Montferrand
- Top 14 2001, finalist with AS Montferrand
