= Aurélien Rougerie =

French rugby union player (born 1980)

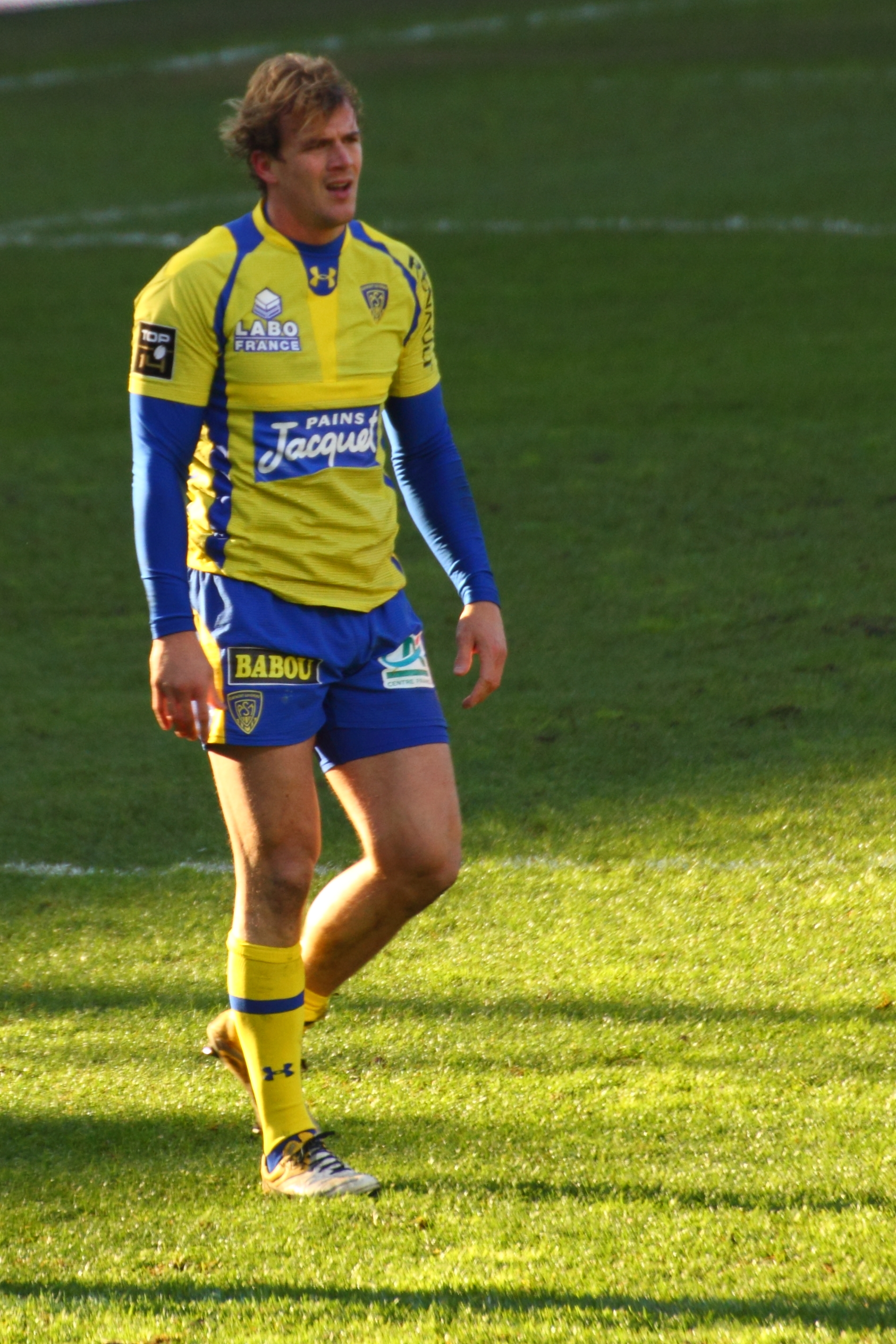
- Rougerie with Clermont in 2012
- Born: Aurélien Rougerie; 26 September 1980 (age 46) Beaumont, France
- Height: 1.93 m (6 ft 4 in)
- Weight: 104 kg (229 lb; 16.4 st)
- Notable relative(s): Jacques Rougerie, Christine Dulac

Rugby union career
- Position(s): Wing and Centre
Senior career
Years	Team	Apps	(Points)
1999–2018	Clermont	417	(673)
International career
Years	Team	Apps	(Points)
2001–2012	France	76	(115)

Aurélien Rougerie (born 26 September 1980) is a French former rugby union player who played on the wing and center for France and ASM Clermont Auvergne in the French Top 14 for his entire 19-year career.

== Career ==
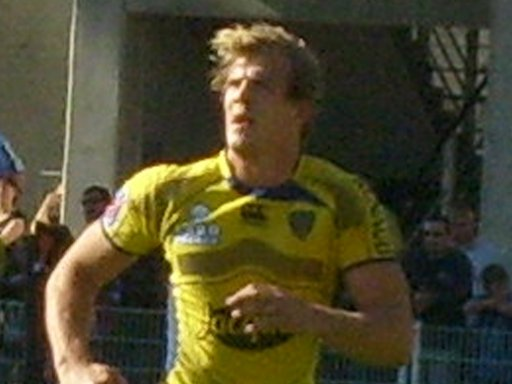
Aurelien Rougerie

Rougerie was born in Beaumont, Puy-de-Dôme. His father, Jacques Rougerie, was also a French international, playing at loosehead prop while his mother was an international at basketball (107 caps).

=== France ===
Rougerie debuted with the French national team against South Africa in 2001. He counts 76 caps for France scoring 23 tries. He played his last game for France in 2012 against Italy.

Rougerie was part of the French team which reached the World Cup final in 2011 when he set up Thierry Dusautoir's try.

Rougerie also captained the French Barbarians on two occasions, winning against Samoa in 2013 at the Stade Marcel Michelin and against Australia in October 2016 (19–11).

Rougerie played for the Barbarians in 2003 against Scotland scoring a try. He is one of the rare player to have played for France, French Barbarians and Barbarians FC in his career.

=== Club ===
Rougerie sued Phil Greening of England for a hand off during a European game in 2002 that left him with a throat injury forcing him to undergo 3 larynx surgeries. Greening was ordered to pay £29,000 in compensation.

In 2007, Rougerie won the European Challenge Cup with Clermont against Bath at the Stoop of Twickenham (22–16). Then he captained the Clermont Auvergne side that won the French championship, the Bouclier de Brennus, after 10 unlucky chances, against Perpignan in a one way final (19–6) on 29 May 2010.

Rougerie won his second Bouclier de Brennus in 2017 with Clermont before his last season as a professional player. Before the French Top 14 Final he came to see his coach Franck Azema and asked him not to start the game at the place of youngster Damian Penaud who finally performed very well during the game, settling up Clermont's only try of the game.

2017-2018 will be his 33rd and last season as an ASM Clermont Auvergne's player.

In France and Europe, Rougerie is seen as an example of longevity and loyalty as a one-club career man.

== Honours ==
Clermont

- Top 14 champions: 2009–10, 2016–17

Personal

- Top 14 top try scorer: (2006–07)
