= Communauté d'agglomération de Bastia =

Bastia
- Communauté d'agglomération
- Location within the department
- Coordinates: 42°42′N 09°26′E
- Country: France
- Region: Corsica
- Department: Haute-Corse
- No. of communes: {{{nbcomm}}}
- Established: 2001
- Area: 68.1 km^{2} (26.3 sq mi)
- Population (2019): 62,240
  - Density: 914/km^{2} (2,370/sq mi)
- Website: www.bastia-agglomeration.corsica

Communauté d'agglomération de Bastia is the communauté d'agglomération, an intercommunal structure, centred on the city of Bastia. It is located in the Haute-Corse department, in the Corsica region, southeastern France. Created in 2001, its seat is in Bastia. Its area is 68.1 km^{2}. Its population was 62,240 in 2019, of which 48,503 in Bastia proper.

== Composition ==
The communauté d'agglomération consists of the following 5 communes:

1. Bastia
2. Furiani
3. San-Martino-di-Lota
4. Santa-Maria-di-Lota
5. Ville-di-Pietrabugno
