= Jacques Rougerie (rugby union) =

France international rugby union player (1945–2023)

- Born: 21 June 1945 Pamiers, France
- Died: 12 August 2023 (aged 78) Ceyrat, France
- Height: 1.80 m (5 ft 11 in)
- Weight: 105 kg (231 lb)
- Notable relative: Aurélien Rougerie

Rugby union career
- Position: Prop/Hooker
Amateur team(s)
Years	Team	Apps	(Points)
- AS Montferrand
International career
Years	Team	Apps	(Points)
1973	France	1	(0)

Jacques Rougerie (21 June 1945 – 12 August 2023) was a French international rugby union player. He was the father of another French international rugby union player, Aurélien Rougerie.

Rougerie played as a Prop or Hooker for AS Montferrand. He made his only test appearance for France on 27 October 1973 against Japan. He was a dentist in Clermont-Ferrand.

Jacques Rougerie died on 12 August 2023, at the age of 78.

== Honours ==
- Selected to represent France, 1973
- Challenge Yves du Manoir 1976
- French championship finalist 1970
