= ASM Clermont Auvergne =

French rugby union club

- Full name: Association Sportive Montferrandaise Clermont Auvergne
- Nickname(s): Montferrand; Les Jaunards (The Yellow Guys); Les Jaune et Bleu (The Yellow and Blues); La Yellow Army
- Founded: 11 October 1911; 115 years ago
- Location: Clermont-Ferrand, France
- Ground: Stade Marcel-Michelin (Capacity: 19,372)
- Chairman: Michelin
- President: Jean-Claude Pats
- Coach: Christophe Urios
- Captain: Baptiste Jauneau
- Most appearances: Aurélien Rougerie (418)
- Top scorer: Gérald Merceron (2,702)
- Most tries: Aurélien Rougerie (134)
- League: Top 14
- 2024–25: 6th
| 1st kit | 2nd kit |

Official website
- www.asm-rugby.com

Association Sportive Montferrandaise Clermont Auvergne (pronounced [klɛʁmɔ̃ ovɛʁɲ]) is a French professional rugby union club from Clermont-Ferrand in Auvergne-Rhône-Alpes that currently competes in Top 14, the top level of the French league system. Clermont are two times French champions in 2010 and 2017. The rugby section is a part of a multi-sport club called AS Montferrand (also known as ASM Omnisports), which was founded in 1911 and adopted that name in 1919. Although the rugby section changed its name to the current ASM Clermont Auvergne in 2004, it is still frequently referred to as Montferrand both within and outside France.

The team play at the 19,022-seat Stade Marcel-Michelin, also known by its nickname, The Bib Park. Clermont wear yellow and blue, the colours of the French tyre manufacturer Michelin, taken from the colours of Montferrand when the firm was created there in 1889.

The city is where Marcel Michelin, the son of the founder of the French tyre manufacturer, decided to implement the first factory but also the stadium after the creation of ASM for its workers before World War I. L'ASM, as they are also called, have reached the French Championship final thirteen times, losing on each occasion until their eleventh trip in 2010, when they won the championship in their 100th year as a club.

== History ==
=== Amateur era ===
The club was established in 1911 as AS Michelin, though they changed their name to AS Montferrandaise in 1922 due to legal obligation. The club was started by Marcel Michelin, the son of André Michelin, the founder of the Michelin tyre manufacturer. He died in deportation at Buchenwald; he had been deported there as a member of the Resistance and was involved in two successful escape attempts before dying during the third.

The club made its first final of any competition in 1935, where they played Perpignan for the Challenge Yves du Manoir. AS Montferrand lost the match, 3–3 and 9–0. The following year they featured in their first championship final; though they lost to RC Narbonne 6 points to 3. They made the final again in 1937, though that match was also lost, 13 points to 7 to CS Vienne. The following season the club won its first title; winning the Challenge Yves du Manoir by defeating Perpignan 23 points to 10.

During the 1940s the club contested the Coupe de France on two occasions, in 1945 and 1947. The club lost on both occasions, by one point, 14 to 13 to SU Agen in 1945, and then 14 to 11 against Toulouse in 1947. It would be another 10 years until the club featured in another competition final; losing to US Dax in the 1957 Challenge Yves du Manoir. The club became a force during the 1970s, starting in 1970 with a 3 points to nil championship loss to La Voulte Sportif. The club then contested the Challenge Yves du Manoir twice in a row over the 1972–73 seasons; losing both finals, against AS Béziers and Narbonne respectively. Then they won the competition in 1976, defeating SC Graulhet 40 points to 12 just a few days after the death of the young international winger, Jean-François Philiponeau, struck on the field during an exhibition game. The club then contested the championship final in 1978, though they lost to Béziers. They also lost the Challenge Yves du Manoir in 1979, against Narbonne.

In 1994 season the club contested both the French championship and the Challenge Yves du Manoir. They lost the Challenge Yves du Manoir to Perpignan (the third time the clubs had met in the competition final). They also lost the championship, defeated 22 points to 16 by Toulouse.

=== Professional era ===
The club contested two finals in the 1999 season as well, the French championship and the European Challenge Cup. They won the European Challenge Cup, defeating fellow French club CS Bourgoin-Jallieu 35 points to 16 at the Stade Gerland in Lyon. However they lost the domestic final, being defeated by Toulouse again, 15 points to 11. The club would meet Toulouse again in the season final of 2001, with Toulouse winning 34 points to 22. In 2004 they contested the European Challenge Cup again, though they lost to English club Harlequins, by one point, 27 to 26 at the last minute.

The team experienced a hard period between 2002 and 2006 and it was only with the arrival of Vern Cotter, in the middle of 2006, that the team's form began to improve. In Vern Cotter's first year as head coach, Clermont reached their first final since 2001 (which they lost in the last minute against Stade Français), and won the European Challenge Cup against Bath at the Twickenham Stoop. Montferrand developed further under Vern Cotter during the following two seasons, but they lose two more finals against Toulouse in 2008, and Perpignan in 2009. But the team continues to bounce back and perform well years of years.

In 2010, in the Heineken Cup the team was drawn against Leicester Tigers and Ospreys in a tough pool. Despite this Montferrand succeeded in winning the pool and were subsequently drawn against the holders of the cup, Leinster Rugby. That was the beginning of what would become one of the greatest rivalries in rugby. In an epic battle, Montferrand lost 29–28. After this loss, they went on to win all of their remaining games to win the French championship against Perpignan (19–6) with a notably exceptional display during the semi-final against RC Toulon in Saint-Étienne.

In 2012 they reached the semi-final of the Heineken Cup. They were beaten by Leinster Rugby and were inches from winning the game at the end but Wesley Fofana dropped the ball on Leinster's try line.

Clermont reached the Heineken Cup final for the first time in 2013 after they beat Munster Rugby 16–10 in the semi-final in Montpellier. They subsequently lost to Toulon in the HEC final which was held in Lansdowne Road in Dublin on 18 May 2013 by a single point (16–15).

In 2014, Clermont reached the Heineken Cup semi-final of the play-offs for the second consecutive time and lost to Saracens.

2015 saw Clermont make it to the final of the European Cup (now European Rugby Champions Cup) but lost to RC Toulon 24–18. A few weeks later, they also lost the final of the French Top 14 against Stade Français 12–6.

2016 saw Clermont having their first blow in the European Rugby Champions Cup since 2011 by failing to make the quarter final after a late loss against Bordeaux at home. But they finally reached the French championship semi-final with a highly controversial lose against Racing 92.

However, the team bounced back and produced during the season 2016–2017, reaching again two finals in the French Top 14 and European Champions Cup. They lost the European Cup against reigning champions Saracens.

In January 2020, Clermont acquired a minority stake in the American rugby club New Orleans Gold. In addition to player exchanges, the teams will seek to facilitate cultural exchanges between the state of Louisiana and France.

== Honours ==
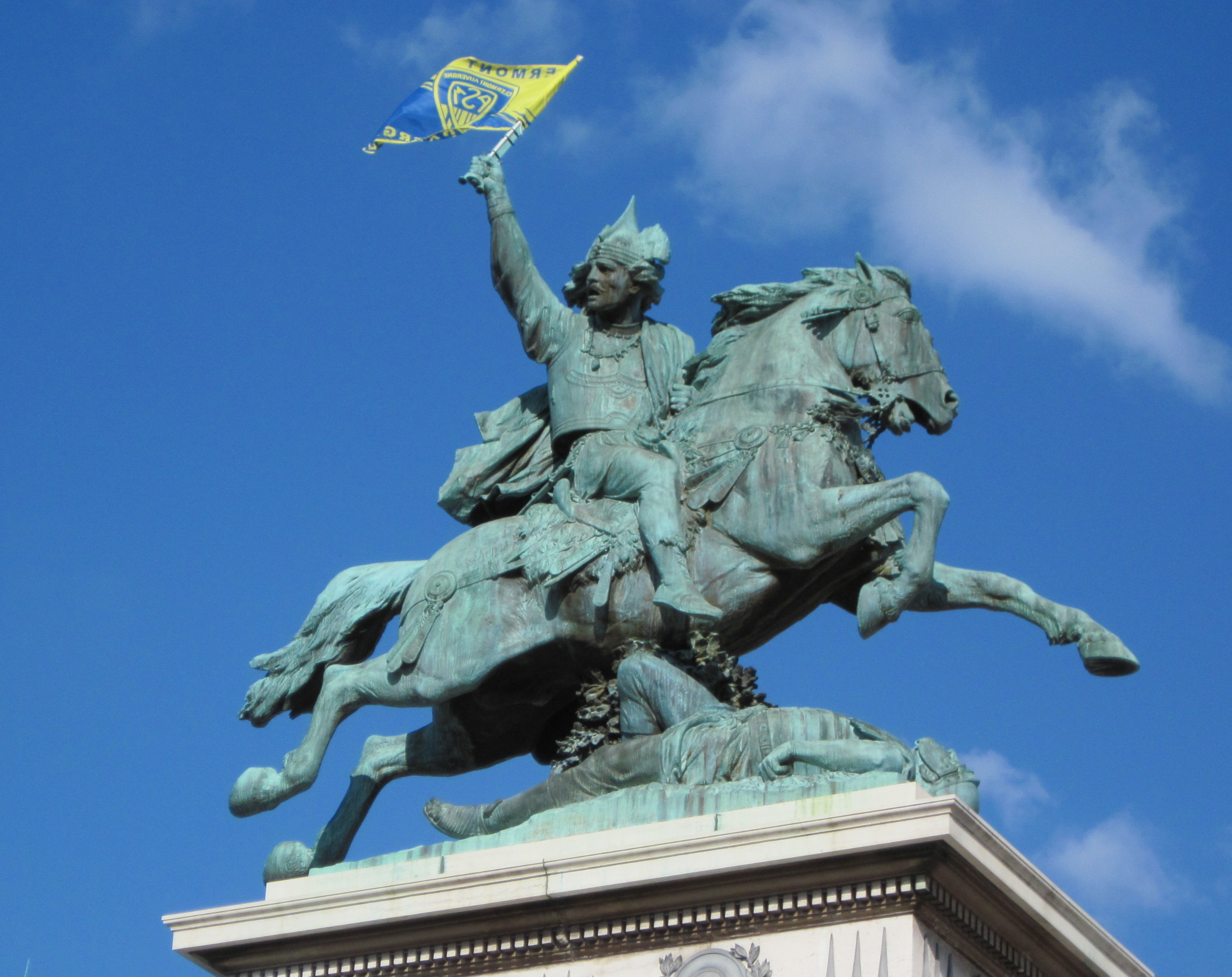
Statue of Vercingetorix decorated with the flag of ASM Clermont Auvergne after the Top 14 championship of 2010.

- European Rugby Champions Cup
  - Runners-up (3): 2013, 2015, 2017
- European Rugby Challenge Cup
  - Champions (3): 1999, 2007, 2019
  - Runners-up (1): 2004
- French championship Top 14
  - Champions (2): 2010, 2017
  - Runners-up (12): 1936, 1937, 1970, 1978, 1994, 1999, 2001, 2007, 2008, 2009, 2015, 2019
- Challenge Yves du Manoir
  - Champions (3): 1938, 1976, 1986
  - Runners-up (6): 1935, 1957, 1972, 1979, 1985, 1994
- French Cup
  - Runners-up (2): 1945, 1947
- League Cup
  - Champions (1):2001

== Finals results ==
=== Heineken Cup and European Rugby Champions Cup ===
| Date | Winners | Score | Runners-up | Venue | Attendance |
|---|---|---|---|---|---|
| 18 May 2013 | (France) RC Toulon | 16–15 | (France) ASM Clermont | Aviva Stadium, Dublin | 51,142 |
| 2 May 2015 | (France) RC Toulon | 24–18 | (France) ASM Clermont | Twickenham, London | 56,662 |
| 13 May 2017 | (England) Saracens | 28–17 | (France) ASM Clermont | Murrayfield Stadium, Edinburgh | 55,272 |

=== European Rugby Challenge Cup ===
| Date | Winners | Score | Runners-up | Venue | Attendance |
|---|---|---|---|---|---|
| 27 February 1999 | (France) AS Montferrand | 35–16 | (France) CS Bourgoin-Jallieu | Stade de Gerland, Lyon | 31,986 |
| 22 May 2004 | (England) Harlequin F.C. | 27–26 | (France) AS Montferrand | Madejski Stadium, Reading | 13,123 |
| 19 May 2007 | (France) ASM Clermont | 22–16 | (England) Bath Rugby | Twickenham Stoop, London | 10,134 |
| 10 May 2019 | (France) ASM Clermont | 36–16 | (France) La Rochelle | St James' Park, Newcastle | 28,438 |

=== French championship ===
| Date | Winners | Score | Runners-up | Venue | Attendance |
|---|---|---|---|---|---|
| 10 May 1936 | RC Narbonne | 6–3 | AS Montferrand | Stade des Ponts Jumeaux, Toulouse | 25,000 |
| 2 May 1937 | CS Vienne | 13–7 | AS Montferrand | Stade des Ponts Jumeaux, Toulouse | 17,000 |
| 17 May 1970 | La Voulte Sportif | 3–0 | AS Montferrand | Stadium Municipal, Toulouse | 35,000 |
| 28 May 1978 | AS Béziers | 31–9 | AS Montferrand | Parc des Princes, Paris | 42,004 |
| 28 May 1994 | Stade Toulousain | 22–16 | AS Montferrand | Parc des Princes, Paris | 48,000 |
| 29 May 1999 | Stade Toulousain | 15–11 | AS Montferrand | Stade de France, Saint-Denis | 78,000 |
| 9 June 2001 | Stade Toulousain | 34–22 | AS Montferrand | Stade de France, Saint-Denis | 78,000 |
| 9 June 2007 | Stade Français | 23–18 | ASM Clermont | Stade de France, Saint-Denis | 79,654 |
| 28 June 2008 | Stade Toulousain | 26–20 | ASM Clermont | Stade de France, Saint-Denis | 79,275 |
| 6 June 2009 | USA Perpignan | 22–13 | ASM Clermont | Stade de France, Saint-Denis | 79,205 |
| 29 May 2010 | ASM Clermont | 19–6 | USA Perpignan | Stade de France, Saint-Denis | 79,262 |
| 13 June 2015 | Stade Français | 12–6 | ASM Clermont | Stade de France, Saint-Denis | 79,000 |
| 4 June 2017 | ASM Clermont | 22–16 | RC Toulon | Stade de France, Saint-Denis | 79,771 |
| 15 June 2019 | Stade Toulousain | 24–18 | ASM Clermont | Stade de France, Saint-Denis | 79,786 |

=== Challenge Yves du Manoir ===
| Date | Winners | Score | Runners-up |
|---|---|---|---|
| 1935 | USA Perpignan | 3–3, 6–0 | AS Montferrand |
| 1938 | AS Montferrand | 23–10 | USA Perpignan |
| 1957 | US Dax | 6–6* | AS Montferrand |
| 1972 | AS Béziers | 27–6 | AS Montferrand |
| 1976 | AS Montferrand | 40–12 | SC Graulhet |
| 1979 | RC Narbonne | 9–7 | AS Montferrand |
| 1985 | RC Nice | 21–16 | AS Montferrand |
| 1986 | AS Montferrand | 22–15 | FC Grenoble |
| 1994 | USA Perpignan | 18–3 | AS Montferrand |

* Note: by virtue of younger players

=== French Cup ===
| Date | Winners | Score | Runners-up |
|---|---|---|---|
| 1945 | SU Agen | 14–13 | AS Montferrand |
| 1947 | Stade Toulousain | 14–11 | AS Montferrand |

== Current standings ==
2025–26 Top 14 Table
| Pos | Team | Pld | W | D | L | PF | PA | PD | TF | TA | TB | LB | Pts | Qualification |
|---|---|---|---|---|---|---|---|---|---|---|---|---|---|---|
| 1 | Toulouse | 26 | 18 | 0 | 8 | 981 | 617 | +364 | 134 | 73 | 13 | 3 | 86 (Note: Toulouse received a two-point deduction due to irregularities around the transfer of their former player Melvyn Jaminet) | Qualification for playoff semi-finals and European Rugby Champions Cup |
| 2 | Montpellier | 26 | 17 | 1 | 8 | 824 | 587 | +237 | 101 | 69 | 8 | 4 | 82 | Qualification for playoff semi-finals and European Rugby Champions Cup |
| 3 | Stade Français | 26 | 15 | 1 | 10 | 869 | 664 | +205 | 113 | 83 | 11 | 6 | 79 | Qualification for playoff semi-final qualifiers and European Rugby Champions Cup |
| 4 | Pau | 26 | 17 | 0 | 9 | 817 | 665 | +152 | 98 | 82 | 7 | 3 | 78 | Qualification for playoff semi-final qualifiers and European Rugby Champions Cup |
| 5 | Racing 92 | 26 | 16 | 1 | 9 | 828 | 723 | +105 | 101 | 91 | 6 | 2 | 74 | Qualification for playoff semi-final qualifiers and European Rugby Champions Cup |
| 6 | La Rochelle | 26 | 15 | 0 | 11 | 824 | 634 | +190 | 106 | 73 | 8 | 4 | 72 | Qualification for playoff semi-final qualifiers and European Rugby Champions Cup |
| 7 | Clermont | 26 | 15 | 0 | 11 | 812 | 708 | +104 | 103 | 87 | 8 | 3 | 71 | Qualification for European Rugby Champions Cup |
| 8 | Bordeaux Bègles | 26 | 14 | 0 | 12 | 822 | 719 | +103 | 113 | 90 | 8 | 6 | 70 | Qualification for European Rugby Champions Cup |
| 9 | Toulon | 26 | 12 | 1 | 13 | 714 | 820 | −106 | 96 | 103 | 8 | 1 | 59 | Qualification for European Rugby Challenge Cup |
| 10 | Castres | 26 | 11 | 0 | 15 | 660 | 751 | −91 | 81 | 96 | 3 | 8 | 55 | Qualification for European Rugby Challenge Cup |
| 11 | Lyon | 26 | 11 | 1 | 14 | 734 | 774 | −40 | 92 | 101 | 3 | 3 | 52 | Qualification for European Rugby Challenge Cup |
| 12 | Bayonne | 26 | 11 | 0 | 15 | 747 | 869 | −122 | 94 | 113 | 4 | 3 | 51 | Qualification for European Rugby Challenge Cup |
| 13 | Perpignan | 26 | 6 | 0 | 20 | 550 | 797 | −247 | 64 | 99 | 1 | 4 | 29 | Qualification for relegation play-off |
| 14 | Montauban | 26 | 1 | 1 | 24 | 495 | 1349 | −854 | 61 | 197 | 0 | 1 | 7 | Relegation to Pro D2 |

Updated to match(es) played on 17 May 2026. Source: Top 14

== Current squad ==
The Clermont squad for the 2026–27 season is:

ASM Clermont Auvergne 2026–27 Top 14 squad
| **Props**: (Georgia (country)) **Giorgi Akhaladze**; (Georgia (country)) **Giorgi Dzmanashvili**; (France) Mathéo Frisach; (France) Sacha Lotrian; (France) **Régis Montagne**; (Moldova) **Cristian Ojovan**; (New Zealand) **Ofa Tu'ungafasi**; **Hookers**: (France) Étienne Fourcade; (France) **Barnabé Massa**; (Fiji) **Peniami Narisia**; **Locks**: (France) Thomas Ceyte; (France) Thibaud Lanen; (France) Léo Michaux; (Fiji) **Tevita Ratuva**; (Australia) **Darcy Swain** | **Back row**: (France) Antoine Chalus-Cercy; (France) Anthime Hemery; (Australia) **Rob Leota**; (Argentina) **Marcos Kremer**; (Fiji) Pio Muarua; (France) Kévin Noah; (Fiji) **Pita Gus Sowakula**; (France) **Killian Tixeront**; (France) **Selevasio Tolofua**; (France) Louis Vermeulen; (France) Baptiste Veschambre; **Scrum-halves**: (France) Baptiste Germain; (France) **Baptiste Jauneau** **(c)**; (France) Lucas Zamora; **Fly-halves**: (France) Justin Bouraux; (New Zealand) **Harry Plummer** | **Centres**: (France) Mathys Belaubre; (France) Léon Darricarrère; (France) Timéo Frier; (New Zealand) AJ Lam; (Fiji) Alivereti Loaloa; **Wings**: (Argentina) **Bautista Delguy**; (France) Yerim Fall; (France) Joris Jurand; (New Zealand) Etene Nanai-Seturo; (France) **Alivereti Raka**; **Fullbacks**: (France) Axel Guillaud; (France) Kylan Hamdaoui |
**(c)** denotes the team captain. **Bold** denotes internationally capped players. Source:

=== Espoirs squad ===
ASM Clermont Auvergne 2026–27 Espoirs squad
| **Props**: (France) Cedric Atlan; (France) Enzo Defillon; (France) Nohem Ez Zahouany; (England) Hendro Hattingh; (England) Oliver McCall; (France) Alois Montavy; (France) Tristan Olivier; (France) Noah Traini; **Hookers**: (France) Raphaël Ceyssat; (France) Gabriel Melchor; (France) Chuan Un; (France) Mevlut Zangin; **Locks**: (France) Andrea Foiama-Crespo; (France) Julien Fournier; (France) Pierre Job; (England) Nico Jones; (France) Noann Lavail | **Back row**: (France) Scott Barre; (France) Ilan Cusin; (France) Mathis De Saint-Étienne; (France) Paul Gaspard; (France) Sione Lamelangi; (France) Ephise Navecth; (France) Matthieu Palmier; (France) Raphael Payrastre; **Scrum-halves**: (France) Iban Dubertand; (France) Yanis Chaumeil; (France) Émilien Verdier; **Fly-halves**: (Argentina) Juan Martín Montilla; (France) Matéo Tissot | **Centres**: (France) Noan Braouet; (France) Martin Meyer; (France) Enzo Pawliwec; (France) Florian Senectaire; (France) Jules Vermeulen; **Wingers**: (France) Marius Baron; (France) Yanis Brosset; (France) Dimitri Emery; (France) Muhammed Eren Zengin; (France) Pierre-Emmanuel Fernandes; (France) Ethan Francois; (France) Mathis Rougerie; **Fullbacks**: (France) Mael Berger; (France) Sacha Leroy; (France) Tom Savinel |

== Notable players ==
=== French international players ===
List of players who represented the France national rugby union team while playing for the club.

- Alexandre Audebert
- Olivier Azam
- Benoît Baby
- Jean-Pascal Barraque
- Noël Baudry
- Sébastien Bézy
- Julien Bonnaire
- David Bory
- Olivier Brouzet
- Jean-Marcellin Buttin
- Judicaël Cancoriet
- Stéphane Castaignède
- Pierre Charton
- Jean Chassagne
- Raphaël Chaume
- Bernard Chevallier
- Damien Chouly
- Lucien Cognet
- Jean Costantino
- Arnaud Costes
- Frédéric Costes
- Jacques Cristina
- Vincent Debaty
- Thomas Domingo
- Michel Droitecourt
- André Dubertrand
- Sipili Falatea
- Étienne Falgoux
- Anthony Floch
- Wesley Fofana
- Franck Fournet
- Alessio Galasso
- Guy Gasparotto
- Rémy Grosso
- Fabrice Heyer
- Arthur Iturria
- Loïc Jacquet
- Baptiste Jauneau
- Paul Jedrasiak
- Christophe Juillet
- Benjamin Kayser
- Daniel Kotze
- Yves Lafarge
- Rémi Lamerat
- Jean-Claude Langlade
- Alexandre Lapandry
- Jean-Marc Lhermet
- René Lombarteix
- Camille Lopez
- Olivier Magne
- Julien Malzieu
- Jimmy Marlu
- Philippe Marocco
- Tony Marsh
- Barnabé Massa
- Gérald Merceron
- Olivier Merle
- Pierre Mignoni
- Régis Montagne
- Noa Nakaitaci
- Dacien Olive
- Laurent Pardo
- Morgan Parra
- Roger Paul
- Michel Pebeyre
- Damian Penaud
- Thierry Picard
- Julien Pierre
- Jean-François Phliponeau
- Julien Pierre
- Thibaut Privat
- Alivereti Raka
- André Rochon
- Laurent Rodriguez
- Jean-Pierre Romeu
- Aurélien Rougerie
- Jacques Rougerie
- Philippe Saint-André
- Maurice Savy
- Maurice Siman
- David Skrela
- Rabah Slimani
- Scott Spedding
- Pierre Thiers
- Killian Tixeront
- Sébastien Vahaamahina
- Elvis Vermeulen
- Robert Vigier

This list therefore excludes international players who wore the national jersey before or after their career at ASM Clermont Auvergne : Roger Aguerre, David Attoub, Anthony Belleau, Giorgi Beria, Jean Bernon, Franck Comba, Christophe Deslandes, Pierre-Édouard Detrez, François-Xavier Dutour, Lionel Faure, Alexandre Fischer, Loann Goujon, Daniel Héricé, Julien Hériteau, Arnaud Mignardi, Alexandre Péclier, Adrien Pélissié, Adrien Planté, Jules Plisson, Louis Puech, Marc Raynaud, Christophe Samson, Cédric Soulette, Jérôme Thion, Selevasio Tolofua, Jacobus van Tonder, Sébastien Viars and Armand Vigneau.

=== Former players ===
- (Argentina) Alejandro Campos
- (Argentina) Agustín Creevy
- (Argentina) Mario Ledesma
- (Argentina) Gonzalo Longo
- (Argentina) Martín Scelzo
- (Argentina) Hernán Senillosa
- (Australia) Peter Betham
- (Australia) Pat Howard
- (Australia) Brock James
- (Australia) Sitaleki Timani
- (Australia) John Ulugia
- (Canada) Jamie Cudmore
- (Czech Republic) Jan Macháček
- (England) Nick Abendanon
- (England) Brian Ashton
- (England) Richard Cockerill
- (England) Rory Jennings
- (England) Alex King
- (England) David Strettle
- (Fiji) Seremaia Bai
- (Fiji) Vilimoni Delasau
- (Fiji) Kini Murimurivalu
- (Fiji) Napolioni Nalaga
- (France) Franck Azéma
- (France) Michel Boucheron
- (France) Benoit Cabello
- (France) Charlie Cassang
- (France) Raphaël Chanal
- (France) Camille Gerondeau
- (France) Thierry Lacrampe
- (France) Geoffroy Messina
- (France) Bastien Pourailly
- (France) Ludovic Radosavljevic
- (France) Clément Ric
- (France) Enzo Sanga
- (France) Atila Septar
- (France) Pierre Vigouroux
- (France) Tani Vili
- (Georgia (country)) Otar Giorgadze
- (Georgia (country)) Beka Kakabadze
- (Georgia (country)) Viktor Kolelishvili
- (Georgia (country)) Goderdzi Shvelidze
- (Georgia (country)) Davit Zirakashvili
- (Italy) Gonzalo Canale
- (Italy) Alessandro Troncon
- (Japan) Kotaro Matsushima
- (New Zealand) Sam Broomhall
- (New Zealand) Mike Delany
- (New Zealand) Zac Guildford
- (New Zealand) Joe Karam
- (New Zealand) Regan King
- (New Zealand) Sione Lauaki
- (New Zealand) Kevin Senio
- (New Zealand) Sitiveni Sivivatu
- (New Zealand) Benson Stanley
- (New Zealand) Isaia Toeava
- (Portugal) Julien Bardy
- (Samoa) Tasesa Lavea
- (Samoa) Tim Nanai-Williams
- (Samoa) Ti'i Paulo
- (Samoa) George Pisi
- (Samoa) John Senio
- (Samoa) Gavin Williams
- (Scotland) Paul Burnell
- (Scotland) Greig Laidlaw
- (Scotland) Jason White
- (Scotland) Nathan Hines
- (South Africa) Selborne Boome
- (South Africa) Marius Joubert
- (South Africa) Breyton Paulse
- (South Africa) Brent Russell
- (South Africa) John Smit
- (South Africa) Gerhard Vosloo
- (Spain) Samuel Ezeala
- (Spain) Pierre-Emmanuel Garcia
- (Tonga) Seti Kiole
- (Tonga) Johnny Ngauamo
- (United States) Kevin Dalzell
- (Wales) Jonathan Davies
- (Wales) Stephen Jones
- (Wales) Lee Byrne

== See also ==
- List of rugby union clubs in France
- Rugby union in France
