= Stade Georges Pompidou =

Sports Stadium in France

Coordinates: 48°52′36″N 2°31′20″E

- Interactive map of Stade Georges Pompidou
- Location: Valence, France
- Owner: City of Valence
- Capacity: 15,128
- Surface: Grass

Construction
- Opened: 1974

Tenants
- ASOA Valence; ROC La Voulte-Valence

Stade Georges Pompidou (French pronunciation: [stad ʒɔʁʒ pɔ̃pidu]) is a stadium in Valence, France. It is currently used for football and rugby union matches. In football, it is the home stadium of ASOA Valence. In rugby, it was home to Valence Sportif before the club's 2010 merger with nearby La Voulte Sportif to form ROC La Voulte-Valence; the merged club maintains its offices at the stadium and uses it as one of its two home grounds. The stadium holds 15,128 spectators. It is named after Georges Pompidou.

On 8 February 2011, the stadium hosted an international friendly between Ivory Coast and Mali. Ivory Coast won the match 1–0.
