= Pierre Thiers =

France international rugby union player

- Born: 16 April 1914 Thiers, France
- Died: 23 May 1977 (aged 63) Clermont-Ferrand, France
- Height: 5 ft 9 in (175 cm)
- Weight: 177 lb (80 kg)
- Occupation: Knife maker

Rugby union career
- Position: Scrum-half / Flanker
International career
Years	Team	Apps	(Points)
1936–45	France	9	(17)

Pierre Thiers (16 April 1914 – 23 May 1977) was a French international rugby union player.

Thiers hailed from Thiers, Puy-de-Dôme, and attended Blaise-Pascal high school in Clermont-Ferrand, where he picked up rugby.

Initially a scrum–half, Thiers was selected by France from AS Montferrand and debuted in 1936. His international career was interrupted by World War II, during which he was held as a German prisoner of war. After being repatriated, Thiers captained France in the 1945–46 Victory Internationals and along with Joseph Desclaux became one of only two French player to appear in international rugby both sides of the war. He also has the distinction of being capped for France as both a back and forward, with his later appearances coming as a flanker.

Thiers, like many in his hometown, was a knife maker by trade.

== See also ==
- List of France national rugby union players
