= Valence Sportif =

French rugby union club, based in Valence

(France) Valence Sportif
- Full name: Valence Sportif
- Founded: 1905
- Disbanded: 2010 (merged with La Voulte Sportif)
- Location: Valence, France
- Ground(s): Georges-Pompidou; Des Baumes (Capacity: 12,500; 5,000)

Valence Sportif was a French rugby union club based in Valence, Drôme. The team last competed in Fédérale 2, the fourth division of French rugby. Valence were established in 1905, and played in white and red. In 2010, the club merged with nearby La Voulte Sportif to form the current club ROC La Voulte-Valence (French: Rhône ovalie club La Voulte-Valence).

== Honours ==
- Deuxième Division:
  - Runners-up: 1962
- Challenge Jules Cadenat:
  - Runners-up: 1976

== Famous players ==
- Élie Cester
- Sébastien Chabal
- Gérard Rousset

== See also ==
- List of rugby union clubs in France
