= ROC La Voulte-Valence =

French rugby union club, based in Valence

(France) La Voulte-Valence
- Full name: Rhône ovalie club La Voulte-Valence
- Founded: 2010
- Location: Valence, France
- Ground(s): Stade Georges-Pompidou; Stade Battandier-Lukowiak (Capacity: 14,380; 5,000)
- President: Jean Louis Reyes
- Coach: Jharay Russell
- League: Fédérale 1

ROC La Voulte-Valence (French: Rhône ovalie club La Voulte-Valence) is a French rugby union club based in Valence, Drôme and playing home matches in Valence and La Voulte-sur-Rhône in the adjacent department of Ardèche. The team currently competes in Fédérale 1, the third division of French rugby.

The club was established in 2010 by a merger of Valence Sportif, founded in 1905, and La Voulte Sportif, founded in 1907. Its main stadium is Valence's former ground of Stade Georges-Pompidou, with La Voulte's former home of Stade Battandier-Lukowiak as a secondary home. They play in black and white.

== Honours ==
- Première Division (now Top 14):
  - Champions: 1970 (La Voulte)
- Deuxième Division (now Pro D2):
  - Runners-up: 1935 (Valence), 1951 (La Voulte), 1962 (Valence)
- Challenge de l'Espérance:
  - Champion: 1962 (La Voulte), 1963 (La Voulte), 1987 (Valence)
  - Champion: 1964 (La Voulte), 1977 (Valence), 1984 (Valence)
- Challenge Jules Cadenat:
  - Champion: 1976 (Valence)

== Famous players ==
- Élie Cester (Valence)
- Sébastien Chabal (Valence)
- Gérard Rousset (Valence)

== See also ==
- List of rugby union clubs in France
