= The Showdown (rugby union) =

Annual rugby union match in London

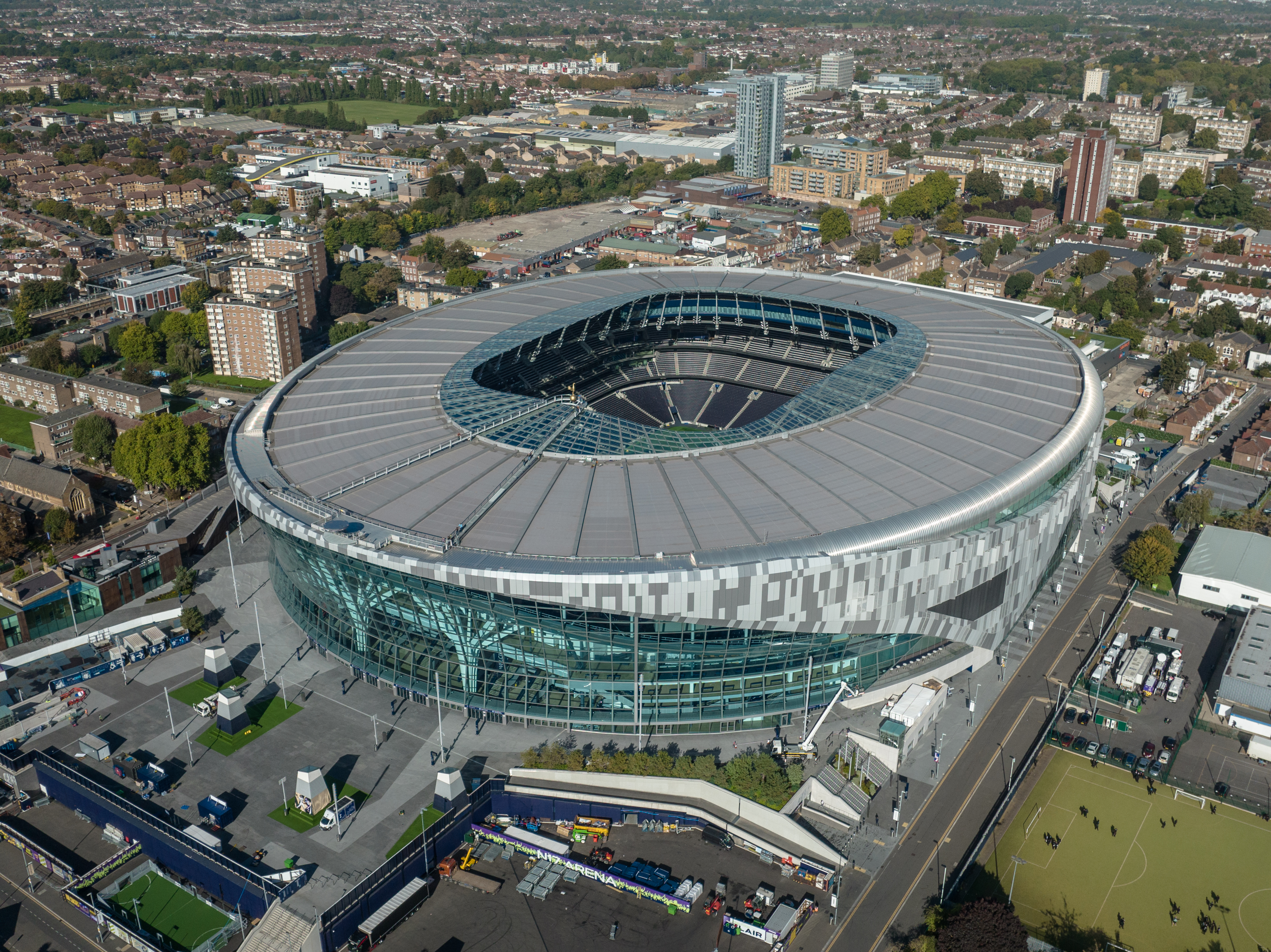
An aerial view of Tottenham Hotspur Stadium in north London, England, which is the third and current host venue for The Showdown.

The Showdown (previously known as Derby Day) is the annual showpiece rugby union match hosted by Saracens in Premiership Rugby, the top-flight professional rugby competition in England. Starting in 2009, the event has served as the club's marquee home fixture during each domestic season, usually against their closest rivals, fellow London club Harlequins. To date, the fixture has taken place at three large-capacity stadiums around the team's home city of London – Wembley Stadium, London Stadium and Tottenham Hotspur Stadium – and it has regularly achieved among the biggest crowds in the league since the 2009–10 season.

The event is notable for holding the current record for the highest ever attendance for a Premiership Rugby match, under its previous branding of 'Derby Day'. This record was set during the match between Saracens and Harlequins at Wembley on 28 March 2015, which had a live gate of 84,068 people – then a world record for a domestic club rugby union match, until this was broken by the 2016 Top 14 final. Furthermore, under its current branding of 'The Showdown', the fixture also held the record as the most-watched Premiership game in the competition's 26-year history. This record was set during the match between Saracens and Harlequins on 25 March 2023, which attracted a combined peak television audience of 1.516 million people, accounting for 7.1 per cent share of all British TV viewers at that time.

The rivalry between Saracens and Harlequins also extends into women's rugby. Beginning in 2021, Premiership Women's Rugby clubs Saracens Women and Harlequins Women have met at Barnet Copthall each season for their own version of the annual showpiece match, under the banner of The London Derby (previously known as The Duel). In addition, the women's team will also feature in The Showdown for the first time in 2026, as part of a double-header with the men's team.

== History ==
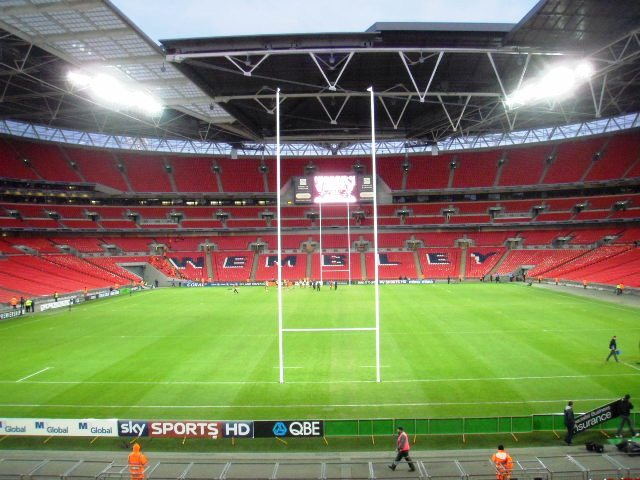
A pitch view of Wembley Stadium in north London, England, before the league match between Saracens and Worcester Warriors in February 2010.

Prior to launching their own showpiece event, Saracens had frequently been involved in the London Double Header at Twickenham Stadium, which took place between 2004 and 2017. Subsequently, for the 2009–10 season, the club announced it would stage three of its Premiership home games – as well as a special exhibition match against South Africa – at Wembley Stadium, in a bid to boost supporter numbers.

The event then moved to a once-a-year schedule, before being formally branded as 'Derby Day' in 2012, with local rivals Harlequins as the regular opponents. Between 2012 and 2015, this fixture broke the world record for a club rugby attendance on three occasions. After eight years at Wembley Stadium, Derby Day switched over to the London Stadium – the home of Premier League football club West Ham – in 2018 and 2019.

In 2019, Saracens announced an initial five-year stadium partnership with Tottenham Hotspur to host fixtures annually, under the new banner of 'The Showdown', at the Premier League club's ground. A four-year extension to this collaboration was agreed in 2024, with matches continuing to be staged at Tottenham Hotspur Stadium until at least 2028.

The opening instalment of The Showdown was originally due to occur March 2020 – however, the COVID-19 pandemic led to the suspension of the 2019–20 season before this date. As a consequence, when the league resumed, games were played behind closed doors over the next six months. Once full-capacity crowds were allowed to return to stadia at the start of the 2021–22 season, Saracens finally held their first game at the Tottenham Hotspur Stadium in March 2022, against Bristol. Thereafter, the fixture reverted to the usual rivalry match-up with Harlequins from 2023 to 2025.

== Results summary ==
The following table outlines the results of each showpiece match hosted by Saracens in Premiership Rugby:

| Season | Round | Date | Opponent | Score | Stadium | Attendance |
|---|---|---|---|---|---|---|
| 2009–10 | 2 | 12 September 2009 | Northampton Saints | 19–16 | Wembley Stadium | 44,832 |
| 2009–10 | 14 | 13 February 2010 | Worcester Warriors | 25–20 | Wembley Stadium | 40,163 |
| 2009–10 | 20 | 17 April 2010 | Harlequins | 37–18 | Wembley Stadium | 47,106 |
| 2010–11 | 11 | 26 December 2010 | Wasps | 13–6 | Wembley Stadium | 38,425 |
| 2011–12 | 19 | 31 March 2012 | Harlequins | 19–24 | Wembley Stadium | 83,761 |
| 2012–13 | 3 | 15 September 2012 | Leicester Tigers | 9–9 | Wembley Stadium | 41,063 |
| 2013–14 | 17 | 22 March 2014 | Harlequins | 39–17 | Wembley Stadium | 83,889 |
| 2014–15 | 18 | 28 March 2015 | Harlequins | 42–14 | Wembley Stadium | 84,068 |
| 2015–16 | 20 | 16 April 2016 | Harlequins | 22–12 | Wembley Stadium | 80,650 |
| 2016–17 | 19 | 8 April 2017 | Harlequins | 40–19 | Wembley Stadium | 71,324 |
| 2017–18 | 18 | 24 March 2018 | Harlequins | 24–11 | London Stadium | 55,329 |
| 2018–19 | 17 | 23 March 2019 | Harlequins | 27–20 | London Stadium | 42,717 |
| 2019–20 | 15 | 22 August 2020 (Note: The Showdown 1 was delayed from its initial date of March 2020, and relocated from its original venue of Tottenham Hotspur Stadium to Barnet Copthall, where it took place behind closed doors, due to the COVID-19 pandemic.) | Harlequins | 38–24 | Allianz Park | 0 |
| 2021–22 | 21 | 26 March 2022 | Bristol Bears | 27–23 | Tottenham Hotspur Stadium | 49,376 |
| 2022–23 | 21 | 25 March 2023 | Harlequins | 36–24 | Tottenham Hotspur Stadium | 55,109 |
| 2023–24 | 13 | 23 March 2024 | Harlequins | 52–7 | Tottenham Hotspur Stadium | 61,214 |
| 2024–25 | 12 | 22 March 2025 | Harlequins | 12–23 | Tottenham Hotspur Stadium | 54,414 |
| 2025–26 | 12 | 28 March 2026 | Northampton Saints | 17–21 | Tottenham Hotspur Stadium | — |

== Match details ==
=== Saracens vs Northampton (2009) ===
Saracens held their first ever standalone showpiece match at Wembley Stadium in September 2009, defeating Northampton Saints by a score of 19–16. With a crowd of almost 45,000, the club also smashed its record attendance for a home game, with the next best figure recorded as 19,000, which was set during a league match at Vicarage Road in 1998.

12 September 2009
14:45

| Saracens | 19–16 | Northampton Saints |
| Try: Cato; Con: Jackson; Pen: Jackson (3); Drop: Jackson | Report | Try: Clarke; Con: Geraghty; Pen: Geraghty (3) |

Wembley Stadium
Attendance: 44,832
Referee: (England) Andrew Small (RFU)

Team details

| FB | 15 | (England) Alex Goode |
| RW | 14 | (England) Noah Cato |
| OC | 13 | (Fiji) Kameli Ratuvou |
| IC | 12 | (England) Brad Barritt |
| LW | 11 | (United States) Chris Wyles |
| FH | 10 | (New Zealand) Glen Jackson |
| SH | 9 | (South Africa) Neil de Kock |
| N8 | 8 | (South Africa) Ernst Joubert |
| OF | 7 | (England) Andy Saull |
| BF | 6 | (South Africa) Wikus van Heerden |
| RL | 5 | (England) Hugh Vyvyan |
| LL | 4 | (England) Steve Borthwick (c) |
| TP | 3 | (Italy) Carlos Nieto |
| HK | 2 | (South Africa) Schalk Brits |
| LP | 1 | (Wales) Rhys Gill |
Substitutions:
| HK | 16 | (Italy) Fabio Ongaro |
| PR | 17 | (England) Tom Mercey |
| PR | 18 | (England) Richard Skuse |
| LK | 19 | (South Africa) Mouritz Botha |
| N8 | 20 | (Wales) Michael Owen |
| SH | 21 | (New Zealand) Justin Marshall |
| FH | 22 | (South Africa) Derick Hougaard |
| WG | 23 | (England) Richard Haughton |
Coach:
(South Africa) Brendan Venter

| FB | 15 | (England) Ben Foden |
| RW | 14 | (England) Paul Diggin |
| OC | 13 | (England) Jon Clarke |
| IC | 12 | (Ireland) James Downey |
| LW | 11 | (New Zealand) Bruce Reihana |
| FH | 10 | (England) Shane Geraghty |
| SH | 9 | (England) Lee Dickson |
| N8 | 8 | (Ireland) Roger Wilson |
| OF | 7 | (Scotland) Scott Gray |
| BF | 6 | (England) Phil Dowson |
| RL | 5 | (South Africa) Juandre Kruger |
| LL | 4 | (Argentina) Ignacio Fernández Lobbe |
| TP | 3 | (Argentina) Santiago González Bonorino |
| HK | 2 | (England) Dylan Hartley (c) |
| LP | 1 | (Tonga) Soane Tongaʻuiha |
Substitutions:
| HK | 16 | (South Africa) Brett Sharman |
| PR | 17 | (South Africa) Regardt Dreyer |
| PR | 18 | (South Africa) Brian Mujati |
| LK | 19 | (England) Courtney Lawes |
| FL | 20 | (Ireland) Neil Best |
| SH | 21 | (England) Alan Dickens |
| FH | 22 | (Ireland) Barry Everitt |
| CE | 23 | (England) Chris Mayor |
Coach:
(England) Jim Mallinder

=== Saracens vs Worcester (2010) ===
After setting a club attendance record in their inaugural appearance at Wembley Stadium, Saracens announced that they would stage two additional home fixtures at the ground during the 2009–10 season. In the first of these two extra games at Wembley, they beat Worcester Warriors by a score of 25–20.

13 February 2010
15:00

| Saracens | 25–20 | Worcester Warriors |
| Try: De Kock; Con: Jackson; Pen: Jackson (6) | Report | Try: Wood; Penalty try Con: Walker (2); Pen: Walker (2) |

Wembley Stadium
Attendance: 40,163
Referee: (England) Dave Pearson (RFU)

Team details

| FB | 15 | (England) Alex Goode |
| RW | 14 | (Fiji) Michael Tagicakibau |
| OC | 13 | (Fiji) Kameli Ratuvou |
| IC | 12 | (England) Brad Barritt |
| LW | 11 | (United States) Chris Wyles |
| FH | 10 | (New Zealand) Glen Jackson |
| SH | 9 | (South Africa) Neil de Kock (c) |
| N8 | 8 | (South Africa) Ernst Joubert |
| OF | 7 | (England) Andy Saull |
| BF | 6 | (South Africa) Wikus van Heerden |
| RL | 5 | (Scotland) Tom Ryder |
| LL | 4 | (United States) Hayden Smith |
| TP | 3 | (England) Richard Skuse |
| HK | 2 | (South Africa) Schalk Brits |
| LP | 1 | (Samoa) Kas Lealamanua |
Substitutions:
| HK | 16 | (South Africa) Ethienne Reynecke |
| PR | 17 | (Wales) Rhys Gill |
| PR | 18 | (Italy) Carlos Nieto |
| LK | 19 | (South Africa) Mouritz Botha |
| FL | 20 | (Namibia) Jacques Burger |
| SH | 21 | (New Zealand) Justin Marshall |
| FH | 22 | (South Africa) Derick Hougaard |
| WG | 23 | (England) Noah Cato |
Coach:
(South Africa) Brendan Venter

| FB | 15 | (Australia) Chris Latham |
| RW | 14 | (England) Chris Pennell |
| OC | 13 | (Samoa) Dale Rasmussen |
| IC | 12 | (New Zealand) Sam Tuitupou |
| LW | 11 | (England) Miles Benjamin |
| FH | 10 | (New Zealand) Willie Walker |
| SH | 9 | (England) Jonny Arr |
| N8 | 8 | (Zimbabwe) Kai Horstmann |
| OF | 7 | (England) Pat Sanderson (c) |
| BF | 6 | (England) Tom Wood |
| RL | 5 | (England) Craig Gillies |
| LL | 4 | (New Zealand) Greg Rawlinson |
| TP | 3 | (Tonga) Tevita Taumoepeau |
| HK | 2 | (England) Chris Fortey |
| LP | 1 | (England) Adam Black |
Substitutions:
| HK | 16 | (England) Jack Gilding |
| PR | 17 | (Tonga) Aleki Lutui |
| PR | 18 | (France) Olivier Sourgens |
| LK | 19 | (England) Graham Kitchener |
| FL | 20 | (England) Chris Cracknell |
| SH | 21 | (Wales) Ryan Powell |
| FH | 22 | (Wales) Matt Jones |
| WG | 23 | (New Zealand) Rico Gear |
Coach:
(Wales) Mike Ruddock

=== Saracens vs Harlequins (2010) ===
For the club's third and final visit to Wembley Stadium in the 2009–10 season, Saracens faced rivals Harlequins for the first time, establishing the basis for the showpiece fixture's future identity as 'Derby Day' and 'The Showdown'. Saracens were victorious, with the final score of 37–18.

17 April 2010
17:30

| Saracens | 37–18 | Harlequins |
| Try: Saull (2); Brits; Tagicakibau; Joubert; Con: Hougaard; Jackson (2); Pen: Hougaard (2) | Report | Try: Brooker; Monye; York; Pen: Clegg |

Wembley Stadium
Attendance: 47,106
Referee: (England) Martin Fox (RFU)

Team details

| FB | 15 | (England) Alex Goode |
| RW | 14 | (Fiji) Michael Tagicakibau |
| OC | 13 | (England) Adam Powell |
| IC | 12 | (England) Brad Barritt |
| LW | 11 | (England) Rodd Penney |
| FH | 10 | (South Africa) Derick Hougaard |
| SH | 9 | (New Zealand) Justin Marshall |
| N8 | 8 | (South Africa) Ernst Joubert (c) |
| OF | 7 | (England) Andy Saull |
| BF | 6 | (Germany) Justin Melck |
| RL | 5 | (Scotland) Tom Ryder |
| LL | 4 | (England) Hugh Vyvyan |
| TP | 3 | (South Africa) Petrus du Plessis |
| HK | 2 | (South Africa) Schalk Brits |
| LP | 1 | (Italy) Matías Agüero |
Substitutions:
| HK | 16 | (Italy) Fabio Ongaro |
| PR | 17 | (Samoa) Kas Lealamanua |
| PR | 18 | (England) Richard Skuse |
| LK | 19 | (South Africa) Mouritz Botha |
| FL | 20 | (Namibia) Jacques Burger |
| SH | 21 | (South Africa) Neil de Kock |
| FH | 22 | (New Zealand) Glen Jackson |
| CE | 23 | (Fiji) Kameli Ratuvou |
Coach:
(South Africa) Brendan Venter

| FB | 15 | (England) Mike Brown |
| RW | 14 | (England) David Strettle |
| OC | 13 | (England) George Lowe |
| IC | 12 | (England) Jordan Turner-Hall |
| LW | 11 | (England) Tom Williams |
| FH | 10 | (New Zealand) Nick Evans |
| SH | 9 | (England) Danny Care |
| N8 | 8 | (England) Nick Easter (c) |
| OF | 7 | (England) Will Skinner |
| BF | 6 | (England) Tom Guest |
| RL | 5 | (England) George Robson |
| LL | 4 | (England) James Percival |
| TP | 3 | (Ireland) John Andress |
| HK | 2 | (England) Chris Brooker |
| LP | 1 | (Wales) Ceri Jones |
Substitutions:
| HK | 16 | (England) Matt Cairns |
| PR | 17 | (England) Aston Croall |
| PR | 18 | (Samoa) James Johnston |
| LK | 19 | (Ireland) Lewis Stevenson |
| N8 | 20 | (England) Chris York |
| SH | 21 | (England) Karl Dickson |
| CE | 22 | (England) Rory Clegg |
| WG | 23 | (England) Ugo Monye |
Coach:
(Ireland) Conor O'Shea

=== Saracens vs Wasps (2010) ===
Saracens welcomed London Wasps for their return to Wembley Stadium on Boxing Day 2010. The home team picked up the victory with a final score of 13–6.

26 December 2010
15:00

| Saracens | 13–6 | London Wasps |
| Try: Saull; Con: Farrell; Pen: Farrell (2) | Report | Pen: Walder (2) |

Wembley Stadium
Attendance: 38,425
Referee: (England) Tim Wigglesworth (RFU)

Team details

| FB | 15 | (United States) Chris Wyles |
| RW | 14 | (England) David Strettle |
| OC | 13 | (Fiji) Michael Tagicakibau |
| IC | 12 | (England) Brad Barritt |
| LW | 11 | (England) James Short |
| FH | 10 | (England) Owen Farrell |
| SH | 9 | (South Africa) Neil de Kock |
| N8 | 8 | (South Africa) Ernst Joubert |
| OF | 7 | (Germany) Justin Melck |
| BF | 6 | (Scotland) Kelly Brown |
| RL | 5 | (England) Hugh Vyvyan |
| LL | 4 | (England) Steve Borthwick (c) |
| TP | 3 | (Italy) Carlos Nieto |
| HK | 2 | (South Africa) Schalk Brits |
| LP | 1 | (South Africa) Deon Carstens |
Substitutions:
| HK | 16 | (England) Jamie George |
| PR | 17 | (Wales) Rhys Gill |
| PR | 18 | (South Africa) Petrus du Plessis |
| LK | 19 | (United States) Hayden Smith |
| FL | 20 | (England) Andy Saull |
| SH | 21 | (England) Richard Wigglesworth |
| FH | 22 | (Wales) Gavin Henson |
| FB | 23 | (England) Alex Goode |
Coach:
(South Africa) Brendan Venter

| FB | 15 | (England) Mark van Gisbergen |
| RW | 14 | (England) Tom Varndell |
| OC | 13 | (Australia) Ben Jacobs |
| IC | 12 | (Australia) Steve Kefu |
| LW | 11 | (Samoa) David Lemi |
| FH | 10 | (England) Dave Walder |
| SH | 9 | (England) Joe Simpson |
| N8 | 8 | (Wales) Andy Powell |
| OF | 7 | (France) Serge Betsen |
| BF | 6 | (England) Joe Worsley |
| RL | 5 | (England) James Cannon |
| LL | 4 | (England) Simon Shaw (c) |
| TP | 3 | (Wales) Ben Broster |
| HK | 2 | (England) Tom Lindsay |
| LP | 1 | (Samoa) Sakaria Taulafo |
Substitutions:
| HK | 16 | (England) Jason Hobson |
| PR | 17 | (England) Tim Payne |
| PR | 18 | (England) Bob Baker |
| LK | 19 | (New Zealand) Marty Veale |
| FL | 20 | (England) Sam Jones |
| SH | 21 | (Australia) Nic Berry |
| CE | 22 | (England) Seb Jewell |
| WG | 23 | (England) Richard Haughton |
Coach:
(New Zealand) Tony Hanks

=== Derby Day 1 (2012) ===
Saracens and Harlequins contested the first incarnation of Derby Day at Wembley Stadium in March 2012, with the visitors emerging as the winners by 24–19 – the first away victory in this showpiece fixture. The match-day gate of 83,761 set a new world record for a rugby union club match, which was previously held by the 2009–10 Heineken Cup quarter-final match between Leinster and Munster at Croke Park.

31 March 2012
15:00

| Saracens | 19–24 | Harlequins |
| Try: Wigglesworth 71' c Con: Farrell 72'; Pen: Farrell (4) 8', 13', 17', 40' | Report | Try: Turner-Hall 3' c Lowe 23' c Care 58 'c Con: Evans (2) 4', 24'; Clegg 59'; Pen: Clegg 45' |

Wembley Stadium
Attendance: 83,761
Referee: (England) Greg Garner (RFU)

Team details

| FB | 15 | (England) Alex Goode |
| RW | 14 | (England) David Strettle |
| OC | 13 | (United States) Chris Wyles |
| IC | 12 | (England) Owen Farrell |
| LW | 11 | (England) James Short |
| FH | 10 | (England) Charlie Hodgson |
| SH | 9 | (South Africa) Neil de Kock |
| N8 | 8 | (South Africa) Ernst Joubert |
| OF | 7 | (England) Will Fraser |
| BF | 6 | (Germany) Justin Melck |
| RL | 5 | (England) Mouritz Botha |
| LL | 4 | (England) Steve Borthwick (c) |
| TP | 3 | (Italy) Carlos Nieto |
| HK | 2 | (South Africa) Schalk Brits |
| LP | 1 | (England) Matt Stevens |
Substitutions:
| HK | 16 | (England) Jamie George |
| PR | 17 | (England) Mako Vunipola |
| PR | 18 | (South Africa) Petrus du Plessis |
| LK | 19 | (England) George Kruis |
| FL | 20 | (England) Jackson Wray |
| SH | 21 | (England) Richard Wigglesworth |
| CE | 22 | (England) Adam Powell |
| WG | 23 | (Fiji) Michael Tagicakibau |
Coach:
(Ireland) Mark McCall

| FB | 15 | (England) Mike Brown |
| RW | 14 | (England) Tom Williams |
| OC | 13 | (England) George Lowe |
| IC | 12 | (England) Jordan Turner-Hall |
| LW | 11 | (England) Ugo Monye |
| FH | 10 | (New Zealand) Nick Evans |
| SH | 9 | (England) Danny Care |
| N8 | 8 | (England) Nick Easter |
| OF | 7 | (England) Chris Robshaw (c) |
| BF | 6 | (Samoa) Maurie Fa'asavalu |
| RL | 5 | (England) George Robson |
| LL | 4 | (England) Ollie Kohn |
| TP | 3 | (Samoa) James Johnston |
| HK | 2 | (England) Rob Buchanan |
| LP | 1 | (England) Joe Marler |
Substitutions:
| HK | 16 | (England) Aston Croall |
| PR | 17 | (England) Mark Lambert |
| PR | 18 | (England) Will Collier |
| LK | 19 | (Argentina) Tomás Vallejos |
| N8 | 20 | (England) Tom Guest |
| SH | 21 | (England) Karl Dickson |
| FH | 22 | (England) Rory Clegg |
| CE | 23 | (England) Ross Chisholm |
Coach:
(Ireland) Conor O'Shea

=== Saracens vs Leicester (2012) ===
Saracens hosted Leicester Tigers for the 2012–13 showpiece at Wembley Stadium, instead of regular visitors Harlequins. The match ended in 9–9 draw – the first and, to date, only deadlocked result in the event's history.

15 September 2012
15:30

| Saracens | 9–9 | Leicester Tigers |
| Pen: Farrell (1/5) 34'; Hodgson (2/3) 53', 58' | Report | Pen: Flood (3/5) 3', 6', 30' |

Wembley Stadium
Attendance: 41,063
Referee: (England) Martin Fox (RFU)

Team details

| FB | 15 | (England) Alex Goode |
| RW | 14 | (England) Chris Ashton |
| OC | 13 | (England) Joel Tomkins |
| IC | 12 | (England) Brad Barritt |
| LW | 11 | (England) James Short |
| FH | 10 | (England) Owen Farrell |
| SH | 9 | (South Africa) Neil de Kock |
| N8 | 8 | (South Africa) Ernst Joubert |
| OF | 7 | (England) Jackson Wray |
| BF | 6 | (Scotland) Kelly Brown |
| RL | 5 | (England) Mouritz Botha |
| LL | 4 | (England) Steve Borthwick (c) |
| TP | 3 | (Italy) Carlos Nieto |
| HK | 2 | (South Africa) Schalk Brits |
| LP | 1 | (England) Mako Vunipola |
Substitutions:
| HK | 16 | (South Africa) John Smit |
| PR | 17 | (Wales) Rhys Gill |
| PR | 18 | (South Africa) Petrus du Plessis |
| LK | 19 | (South Africa) Alistair Hargreaves |
| FL | 20 | (England) Will Fraser |
| SH | 21 | (England) Richard Wigglesworth |
| FH | 22 | (England) Charlie Hodgson |
| WG | 23 | (United States) Chris Wyles |
Coach:
(Ireland) Mark McCall

| FB | 15 | (Ireland) Geordan Murphy (c) |
| RW | 14 | (New Zealand) Scott Hamilton |
| OC | 13 | (England) Manu Tuilagi |
| IC | 12 | (England) Anthony Allen |
| LW | 11 | (Fiji) Vereniki Goneva |
| FH | 10 | (England) Toby Flood |
| SH | 9 | (England) Sam Harrison |
| N8 | 8 | (England) Thomas Waldrom |
| OF | 7 | (Australia) Julian Salvi |
| BF | 6 | (Tonga) Steve Mafi |
| RL | 5 | (England) Geoff Parling |
| LL | 4 | (England) Graham Kitchener |
| TP | 3 | (England) Dan Cole |
| HK | 2 | (England) Tom Youngs |
| LP | 1 | (Samoa) Logovi'i Mulipola |
Substitutions:
| HK | 16 | (England) George Chuter |
| PR | 17 | (England) Boris Stankovich |
| PR | 18 | (Italy) Martin Castrogiovanni |
| LK | 19 | (South Africa) Rob Andrew |
| N8 | 20 | (England) Jordan Crane |
| SH | 21 | (Australia) Patrick Phibbs |
| FH | 22 | (England) George Ford |
| CE | 23 | (England) Matt Smith |
Coach:
(England) Richard Cockerill

=== Derby Day 2 (2014) ===
Beginning in the 2013–14 season, Saracens moved Derby Day to a consistent time slot in the spring, taking place shortly after the Six Nations Championship, with the target of improving on their attendance record from the 2011–12 season. In front of a new world record crowd of 83,889, which exceeded the figure set in the same fixture two seasons earlier, they triumphed over Harlequins with a final score of 39–17.

22 March 2014
15:15

| Saracens | 39–17 | Harlequins |
| Try: Ashton 9' c Kruis 26' c Farrell 39' c Burger 57' m Bosch 79' c Con: Farrell (3/4) 10', 27', 40'; Hodgson (1/1) 80'; Pen: Farrell (2/2) 22', 33' | Report | Try: Dickson 30' c S. Smith 42' c Con: Evans (2/2) 30', 43'; Pen: Evans (1/1) 20' |

Wembley Stadium
Attendance: 83,889
Referee: (Ireland) JP Doyle (RFU)

Team details

| FB | 15 | (England) Alex Goode |
| RW | 14 | (England) Chris Ashton |
| OC | 13 | (Argentina) Marcelo Bosch |
| IC | 12 | (England) Brad Barritt |
| LW | 11 | (England) David Strettle | | (substituted off) 5' |
| FH | 10 | (England) Owen Farrell | | (substituted off) 63' |
| SH | 9 | (England) Richard Wigglesworth | | (substituted off) 49' |
| N8 | 8 | (South Africa) Ernst Joubert |
| OF | 7 | (Namibia) Jacques Burger |
| BF | 6 | (England) Jackson Wray | | (substituted off) 60' |
| RL | 5 | (England) George Kruis | | (substituted off) 71' |
| LL | 4 | (England) Steve Borthwick (c) | (yellow card) 42' |
| TP | 3 | (Samoa) James Johnston | | (substituted off) 49' |
| HK | 2 | (South Africa) Schalk Brits | | (substituted off) 60' |
| LP | 1 | (England) Mako Vunipola | | (substituted off) 60' |
Substitutions:
| HK | 16 | (England) Jamie George | | (substituted on) 60' |
| PR | 17 | (England) Richard Barrington | | (substituted on) 60' |
| PR | 18 | (England) Matt Stevens | | (substituted on) 49' |
| LK | 19 | (England) Mouritz Botha | | (substituted on) 71' |
| FL | 20 | (Scotland) Kelly Brown | | (substituted on) 60' |
| SH | 21 | (South Africa) Neil de Kock | | (substituted on) 49' |
| FH | 22 | (England) Charlie Hodgson | | (substituted on) 63' |
| CE | 23 | (Scotland) Duncan Taylor | | (substituted on) 5' |
Coach:
(Ireland) Mark McCall

| FB | 15 | (England) Ollie Lindsay-Hague |
| RW | 14 | (England) Sam Smith |
| OC | 13 | (England) Matt Hopper |
| IC | 12 | (England) Tom Casson |
| LW | 11 | (England) Ugo Monye | (substituted off) 78' |
| FH | 10 | (New Zealand) Nick Evans |
| SH | 9 | (England) Karl Dickson | (substituted off) 73' |
| N8 | 8 | (England) Nick Easter (c) |
| OF | 7 | (England) Luke Wallace |
| BF | 6 | (Samoa) Maurie Fa'asavalu | (substituted off) 59' |
| RL | 5 | (England) George Robson |
| LL | 4 | (England) Nick Kennedy | (substituted off) 59' |
| TP | 3 | (England) Kyle Sinckler | (substituted off) 60' |
| HK | 2 | (England) Joe Gray | (substituted off) 41' |
| LP | 1 | (England) Joe Marler | (substituted off) 60' |
Substitutions:
| HK | 16 | (England) Dave Ward | (substituted on) 41' |
| PR | 17 | (England) Mark Lambert | (substituted on) 60' |
| PR | 18 | (England) Paul Doran-Jones | (substituted on) 60' |
| LK | 19 | (England) Joe Trayfoot | (substituted on) 59' | (substituted off) 73' |
| N8 | 20 | (England) Tom Guest | (substituted on) 59' |
| SH | 21 | (England) Sam Stuart | (substituted on) 73' |
| FH | 22 | (England) Louis Grimoldby | (substituted on) 78' |
| CE | 23 | (England) Jordan Turner-Hall | | (substituted on) 73' |
Coach:
(Ireland) Conor O'Shea

=== Derby Day 3 (2015) ===
Saracens and Harlequins confirmed that they would continue their burgeoning rivalry with a return to Wembley Stadium in March 2015. Saracens took the victory with a final score of 42–14 – their largest winning margin at the stadium. For the third consecutive meeting between the two teams at Wembley, a new world record was set, as 84,068 supporters attended to create the biggest ever crowd for a rugby union club match.

28 March 2015
15:15

| Saracens | 42–14 | Harlequins |
| Try: Wyles (2) 10' c, 73' c Ashton (2) 23' m, 50' c B. Vunipola 79' c Con: Hodgson (1/2) 11'; Goode (3/3) 51', 74', 79'; Pen: Hodgson (1/2) 15'; Goode (2/2) 32', 34' | Report | Try: Clifford 1' m Pen: Evans (3/3) 17', 46', 56' |

Wembley Stadium
Attendance: 84,068
Referee: (England) Wayne Barnes (RFU)

Team details

| FB | 15 | (England) Alex Goode |
| RW | 14 | (England) Chris Ashton | (yellow card) 71' |
| OC | 13 | (Argentina) Marcelo Bosch |
| IC | 12 | (United States) Chris Wyles |
| LW | 11 | (England) David Strettle | | (substituted off) 74' |
| FH | 10 | (England) Charlie Hodgson | | (substituted off) 66' |
| SH | 9 | (South Africa) Neil de Kock | | (substituted off) 49' |
| N8 | 8 | (South Africa) Ernst Joubert |
| OF | 7 | (Namibia) Jacques Burger |
| BF | 6 | (England) Jackson Wray | | (substituted off) 49' |
| RL | 5 | (South Africa) Alistair Hargreaves (c) | | (substituted off) 35' |
| LL | 4 | (England) George Kruis |
| TP | 3 | (Samoa) James Johnston | | (substituted off) 62' |
| HK | 2 | (England) Jamie George | | (substituted off) 74' |
| LP | 1 | (England) Mako Vunipola | | (substituted off) 62' |
Substitutions:
| HK | 16 | (England) Scott Spurling | | (substituted on) 74' |
| PR | 17 | (Wales) Rhys Gill | | (substituted on) 62' |
| PR | 18 | (England) Biyi Alo | | (substituted on) 62' |
| LK | 19 | (England) Maro Itoje | | (substituted on) 35' |
| FL | 20 | (Scotland) Kelly Brown | | (substituted on) 49' |
| SH | 21 | (England) Richard Wigglesworth | | (substituted on) 49' |
| CE | 22 | (England) Nick Tompkins | | (substituted on) 74' |
| WG | 23 | (Romania) Cătălin Fercu | | (substituted on) 66' |
Coach:
(Ireland) Mark McCall

| FB | 15 | (England) Ross Chisholm | | (substituted off) 71' |
| RW | 14 | (England) Marland Yarde |
| OC | 13 | (England) Matt Hopper |
| IC | 12 | (England) Harry Sloan |
| LW | 11 | (England) Ugo Monye | (yellow card) 14' |
| FH | 10 | (New Zealand) Nick Evans | | (substituted off) 76' |
| SH | 9 | (England) Danny Care | | (substituted off) 61' |
| N8 | 8 | (England) Nick Easter |
| OF | 7 | (England) Chris Robshaw |
| BF | 6 | (England) Jack Clifford | | 49' to 60' | | (substituted off) 74' |
| RL | 5 | (England) George Robson |
| LL | 4 | (England) Charlie Matthews | | (substituted off) 49' |
| TP | 3 | (England) Kyle Sinckler | | (substituted off) 34' |
| HK | 2 | (England) Dave Ward | | (substituted off) 60' |
| LP | 1 | (England) Joe Marler (c) | | (substituted off) 69' |
Substitutions:
| HK | 16 | (England) Rob Buchanan | | (substituted on) 60' |
| PR | 17 | (England) Mark Lambert |
| PR | 18 | (England) Matt Shields | | (substituted on) 34' |
| N8 | 19 | (Fiji) Netani Talei | | (substituted on) 49' | (substituted off) 60' | (substituted on) 74' |
| FL | 20 | (England) Luke Wallace | | (substituted on) 49' |
| SH | 21 | (England) Karl Dickson | | (substituted on) 61' |
| FH | 22 | (New Zealand) Ben Botica | | (substituted on) 76' |
| CE | 23 | (England) Charlie Walker | | (substituted on) 71' |
Coach:
(Ireland) Conor O'Shea

Assistant referees:
(England) Roger Bayliff (RFU)
(England) Paul Dix (RFU)
Television match official:
(England) Geoff Warren (RFU)

=== Derby Day 4 (2016) ===
Saracens and Harlequins met at Wembley Stadium once again in April 2016, with the home club earning the win with a score of 22–12. Although the fixture did not set a new attendance record, the match-day gate exceeded 80,000 for the third year in a row.

16 April 2016
15:15

| Saracens | 22–12 | Harlequins |
| Try: Ashton (2) 12' m, 38' c Kruis 29' c Con: Hodgson (2/3) 30', 39'; Pen: Farrell (1/1) 74' | Report | Pen: Botica (4/5) 4', 16', 33', 46' |

Wembley Stadium
Attendance: 80,650
Referee: (England) Greg Garner (RFU)

Team details

| FB | 15 | (England) Alex Goode |
| RW | 14 | (England) Chris Ashton |
| OC | 13 | (Argentina) Marcelo Bosch |
| IC | 12 | (Scotland) Duncan Taylor |
| LW | 11 | (United States) Chris Wyles | (substituted off) 76' |
| FH | 10 | (England) Charlie Hodgson | (substituted off) 54' |
| SH | 9 | (South Africa) Neil de Kock | (substituted off) 52' |
| N8 | 8 | (England) Billy Vunipola | (substituted off) 74' |
| OF | 7 | (England) Jackson Wray |
| BF | 6 | (South Africa) Michael Rhodes |
| RL | 5 | (England) George Kruis |
| LL | 4 | (Scotland) Jim Hamilton | (substituted off) 55' |
| TP | 3 | (South Africa) Petrus du Plessis | (substituted off) 49' |
| HK | 2 | (South Africa) Schalk Brits | (substituted off) 49' |
| LP | 1 | (England) Mako Vunipola (c) | (substituted off) 49' |
Substitutions:
| HK | 16 | (South Africa) Jared Saunders | (substituted on) 49' |
| PR | 17 | (England) Richard Barrington | (substituted on) 49' |
| PR | 18 | (United States) Titi Lamositele | (substituted on) 49' |
| LK | 19 | (United States) Hayden Smith | (substituted on) 55' |
| N8 | 20 | (Italy) Samuela Vunisa | (substituted on) 74' |
| SH | 21 | (England) Richard Wigglesworth | (substituted on) 52' |
| FH | 22 | (England) Owen Farrell | (substituted on) 54' |
| CE | 23 | (England) Nick Tompkins | (substituted on) 76' |
Coach:
(Ireland) Mark McCall

| FB | 15 | (England) Mike Brown |
| RW | 14 | (England) Marland Yarde |
| OC | 13 | (England) Joe Marchant |
| IC | 12 | (Wales) Jamie Roberts |
| LW | 11 | (Scotland) Tim Visser | (substituted off) 15' |
| FH | 10 | (New Zealand) Ben Botica |
| SH | 9 | (England) Danny Care (c) | (substituted off) 71' |
| N8 | 8 | (England) Nick Easter |
| OF | 7 | (England) Jack Clifford | (substituted off) 59' |
| BF | 6 | (England) Chris Robshaw |
| RL | 5 | (England) Sam Twomey |
| LL | 4 | (England) Charlie Matthews |
| TP | 3 | (England) Will Collier | (substituted off) 61' |
| HK | 2 | (England) Joe Gray | (substituted off) 61' |
| LP | 1 | (England) Mark Lambert | (substituted off) 68' | (substituted on) 76' |
Substitutions:
| HK | 16 | (England) Dave Ward | (substituted on) 61' |
| PR | 17 | (Wales) Owen Evans | (substituted on) 68' | (substituted off) 76' |
| PR | 18 | (England) Kyle Sinckler | (substituted on) 61' |
| LK | 19 | (England) George Merrick |
| N8 | 20 | (Samoa) Mat Luamanu | (substituted on) 59' |
| SH | 21 | (England) Karl Dickson | (substituted on) 71' |
| CE | 22 | (England) Matt Hopper |
| WG | 23 | (England) Ross Chisholm | (substituted on) 15' |
Coach:
(Ireland) Conor O'Shea

Assistant referees:
(England) Andrew Jackson (RFU)
(England) Andy Watson (RFU)
Television match official:
(England) Geoff Warren (RFU)

=== Derby Day 5 (2017) ===
The 2017 edition of Derby Day was the event's last appearance at Wembley Stadium, before moving to alternative venues in subsequent years. Saracens beat Harlequins by a score of 40–19.

8 April 2017
16:30

| Saracens | 40–19 | Harlequins |
| Try: Ashton 16' c Brits 23' c Rhodes 72' c Goode 77' c Con: Farrell (4/4) 17', 23', 72', 79'; Pen: Farrell (4/4) 34', 42', 61', 68' | Report | Try: Horwill 74' c Con: Swiel (1/1) 74'; Pen: Evans (4/4) 11', 27', 30', 49' |

Wembley Stadium
Attendance: 71,324
Referee: (England) Ian Tempest (RFU)

Team details

| FB | 15 | (England) Alex Goode |
| RW | 14 | (England) Chris Ashton | (substituted off) 64' |
| OC | 13 | (Scotland) Duncan Taylor |
| IC | 12 | (England) Brad Barritt (c) | (substituted off) 71' | (substituted on) 78' |
| LW | 11 | (Scotland) Sean Maitland | (substituted off) 73' |
| FH | 10 | (England) Owen Farrell |
| SH | 9 | (England) Ben Spencer | (substituted off) 50' |
| N8 | 8 | (England) Billy Vunipola |
| OF | 7 | (England) Jackson Wray |
| BF | 6 | (South Africa) Michael Rhodes | | (substituted off) 78' |
| RL | 5 | (Scotland) Jim Hamilton | (substituted off) 22' |
| LL | 4 | (England) Maro Itoje |
| TP | 3 | (South Africa) Vincent Koch | (substituted off) 58' |
| HK | 2 | (South Africa) Schalk Brits | (substituted off) 53' |
| LP | 1 | (England) Mako Vunipola | (substituted off) 45' |
Substitutions:
| HK | 16 | (England) Jamie George | (substituted on) 53' |
| PR | 17 | (United States) Titi Lamositele | (substituted on) 45' |
| PR | 18 | (South Africa) Petrus du Plessis | (substituted on) 58' |
| LK | 19 | (Ireland) Mark Flanagan | (substituted on) 73' |
| FL | 20 | (England) Joel Conlon | (substituted on) 22' |
| SH | 21 | (England) Richard Wigglesworth | (substituted on) 50' |
| FH | 22 | (England) Alex Lozowski | (substituted on) 71' |
| CE | 23 | (England) Nick Tompkins | (substituted on) 64' |
Coach:
(Ireland) Mark McCall

| FB | 15 | (England) Mike Brown |
| RW | 14 | (England) Marland Yarde |
| OC | 13 | (England) Joe Marchant |
| IC | 12 | (Wales) Jamie Roberts |
| LW | 11 | (Scotland) Tim Visser | (substituted off) 64' |
| FH | 10 | (New Zealand) Nick Evans | (substituted off) 72' |
| SH | 9 | (England) Danny Care (c) | (substituted off) 72' |
| N8 | 8 | (Samoa) Mat Luamanu |
| OF | 7 | (England) Jack Clifford | (substituted off) 3' |
| BF | 6 | (England) Chris Robshaw |
| RL | 5 | (Australia) James Horwill |
| LL | 4 | (England) George Merrick | (substituted off) 55' |
| TP | 3 | (England) Will Collier | (substituted off) 55' |
| HK | 2 | (England) Rob Buchanan | (substituted off) 55' |
| LP | 1 | (England) Joe Marler | (substituted off) 64' |
Substitutions:
| HK | 16 | (England) Joe Gray | (substituted on) 55' |
| PR | 17 | (England) Mark Lambert | (substituted on) 64' |
| PR | 18 | (England) Kyle Sinckler | (substituted on) 55' |
| LK | 19 | (England) Charlie Matthews | (substituted on) 55' |
| FL | 20 | (England) Dave Ward | (substituted on) 3' |
| SH | 21 | (England) Charlie Mulchrone | (substituted on) 72' |
| FH | 22 | (South Africa) Tim Swiel | (substituted on) 72' |
| CE | 23 | (Samoa) Alofa Alofa | (substituted on) 64' |
Coach:
(England) John Kingston

Player of the Match:
(South Africa) Michael Rhodes (Saracens)

Assistant referees:
(England) Roy Maybank (RFU)
(England) Tim Wigglesworth (RFU)
Television match official:
(England) David Sainsbury (RFU)

=== Derby Day 6 (2018) ===
Ahead of the 2017–18 season, Saracens announced that their annual Derby Day fixture against Harlequins would take place at London Stadium for the first time. In the first ever Premiership match at the venue, Saracens won with a score of 24–11.

24 March 2018
15:00

| Saracens | 24–11 | Harlequins |
| Try: L. Williams 8' c Itoje 30' m Con: Lozowski (1/2) 10'; Pen: Lozowski (4/4) 2', 40', 53', 77 | Report | Try: Horwill 50' m Pen: Catrakilis (2/2) 23' 27' |

London Stadium
Attendance: 55,329
Referee: (England) Tom Foley (RFU)

Team details

| FB | 15 | (England) Alex Goode |
| RW | 14 | (Wales) Liam Williams |
| OC | 13 | (Argentina) Marcelo Bosch |
| IC | 12 | (England) Brad Barritt (c) | | (substituted off) 63' |
| LW | 11 | (Scotland) Sean Maitland |
| FH | 10 | (England) Alex Lozowski |
| SH | 9 | (England) Richard Wigglesworth | | (substituted off) 55' |
| N8 | 8 | (England) Jackson Wray |
| OF | 7 | (South Africa) Schalk Burger | | (substituted off) 68' |
| BF | 6 | (England) Nick Isiekwe |
| RL | 5 | (Wales) Dominic Day | | (substituted off) 51' |
| LL | 4 | (England) Maro Itoje |
| TP | 3 | (Argentina) Juan Figallo | | (substituted off) 47' |
| HK | 2 | (England) Jamie George | | (substituted off) 47' |
| LP | 1 | (England) Richard Barrington | | (substituted off) 47' |
Substitutions:
| HK | 16 | (South Africa) Schalk Brits | | (substituted on) 47' |
| PR | 17 | (England) Mako Vunipola | | (substituted on) 47' |
| PR | 18 | (United States) Titi Lamositele | | (substituted on) 47' |
| FL | 19 | (England) Ben Earl | | (substituted on) 47' |
| FL | 20 | (Scotland) Blair Cowan | | (substituted on) 51' |
| SH | 21 | (England) Ben Spencer | | (substituted on) 55' |
| FH | 22 | (England) Max Malins | (yellow card) 69' | (substituted on) 63' |
| WG | 23 | (United States) Chris Wyles |
Coach:
(Ireland) Mark McCall

| FB | 15 | (England) Mike Brown |
| RW | 14 | (Samoa) Alofa Alofa |
| OC | 13 | (England) Joe Marchant |
| IC | 12 | (Wales) Jamie Roberts | (substituted off) 47' |
| LW | 11 | (Scotland) Tim Visser |
| FH | 10 | (South Africa) Demetri Catrakilis | (substituted off) 29' |
| SH | 9 | (England) Danny Care |
| N8 | 8 | (England) James Chisholm |
| OF | 7 | (England) Luke Wallace | (substituted off) 47' |
| BF | 6 | (England) Chris Robshaw |
| RL | 5 | (Australia) James Horwill (c) |
| LL | 4 | (England) Charlie Matthews | (substituted off) 51' |
| TP | 3 | (England) Kyle Sinckler | (substituted off) 75' |
| HK | 2 | (England) Joe Gray | (substituted off) 75' |
| LP | 1 | (England) Mark Lambert | (substituted off) 47' |
Substitutions:
| HK | 16 | (England) Dave Ward | (substituted on) 75' |
| PR | 17 | (England) Joe Marler | (substituted on) 47' |
| PR | 18 | (England) Will Collier | (substituted on) 75' |
| N8 | 19 | (Samoa) Mat Luamanu | (substituted on) 51' |
| FL | 20 | (England) Jack Clifford | (substituted on) 47' |
| SH | 21 | (England) Dave Lewis |
| FH | 22 | (England) Marcus Smith | (substituted on) 29' |
| CE | 23 | (New Zealand) Francis Saili | (substituted on) 47' |
Coach:
(England) John Kingston

Player of the Match:
(England) Maro Itoje (Saracens)

=== Derby Day 7 (2019) ===
Saracens confirmed they would return for their second and final outing at the London Stadium in March 2019. The home side earned the win over Harlequins with a final score of 27–20.

23 March 2019
15:00

| Saracens | 27–20 | Harlequins |
| Try: Burger 45' c Skelton (2) 57' c, 66' c Con: Lozowski (3/3) 46', 58', 66'; Pen: Lozowski (2/2) 35', 39' | Report | Try: M. Smith 31' c Care 40+1' c Con: M. Smith (2/2) 32', 40+2'; Pen: M. Smith (2/2) 9', 61' |

London Stadium
Attendance: 42,717
Referee: (Ireland) JP Doyle (RFU)

Team details

| FB | 15 | (Wales) Liam Williams | (yellow card) 54' |
| RW | 14 | (England) David Strettle |
| OC | 13 | (England) Alex Lozowski | | | | (substituted off) 74' |
| IC | 12 | (England) Brad Barritt (c) | | 58' to 67' |
| LW | 11 | (Scotland) Sean Maitland |
| FH | 10 | (England) Alex Goode |
| SH | 9 | (England) Ben Spencer |
| N8 | 8 | (England) Billy Vunipola |
| OF | 7 | (South Africa) Schalk Burger | | (substituted off) 51' |
| BF | 6 | (England) Jackson Wray |
| RL | 5 | (England) Nick Isiekwe |
| LL | 4 | (Australia) Will Skelton | | (substituted off) 73' |
| TP | 3 | (South Africa) Vincent Koch | | (substituted off) 31' |
| HK | 2 | (England) Jamie George |
| LP | 1 | (United States) Titi Lamositele | | (substituted off) 55' |
Substitutions:
| HK | 16 | (England) Tom Woolstencroft |
| PR | 17 | (England) Richard Barrington | | (substituted on) 55' |
| PR | 18 | (England) Christian Judge | | (substituted on) 31' |
| LK | 19 | (England) Joel Kpoku | | (substituted on) 73' |
| FL | 20 | (England) Ben Earl | | (substituted on) 51' |
| SH | 21 | (England) Henry Taylor |
| FH | 22 | (England) Max Malins |
| CE | 23 | (England) Nick Tompkins | | (substituted on) 58' | (substituted off) 67' | (substituted on) 74' |
Coach:
(Ireland) Mark McCall

| FB | 15 | (England) Mike Brown |
| RW | 14 | (England) Nathan Earle |
| OC | 13 | (England) Joe Marchant | | (substituted off) 36' |
| IC | 12 | (Australia) Ben Tapuai |
| LW | 11 | (England) Ross Chisholm |
| FH | 10 | (England) Marcus Smith |
| SH | 9 | (England) Danny Care | (yellow card) 54' |
| N8 | 8 | (England) Alex Dombrandt |
| OF | 7 | (England) Chris Robshaw |
| BF | 6 | (England) Jack Clifford | | (substituted off) 58' |
| RL | 5 | (Australia) James Horwill (c) | | (substituted off) 67' |
| LL | 4 | (England) Matt Symons | (yellow card) 38' |
| TP | 3 | (England) Kyle Sinckler | | (substituted off) 64' |
| HK | 2 | (Samoa) Elia Elia | | (substituted off) 67' |
| LP | 1 | (England) Joe Marler | | (substituted off) 58' |
Substitutions:
| HK | 16 | (England) Dave Ward | | (substituted on) 67' |
| PR | 17 | (England) Lewis Boyce | | (substituted on) 58' |
| PR | 18 | (England) Will Collier | | (substituted on) 64' |
| LK | 19 | (England) George Merrick | | (substituted on) 67' |
| FL | 20 | (Namibia) Renaldo Bothma | | (substituted on) 58' |
| SH | 21 | (Scotland) Sam Hidalgo-Clyne |
| FH | 22 | (South Africa) Demetri Catrakilis |
| CE | 23 | (Samoa) Alofa Alofa | | (substituted on) 36' |
Coach:
(England) Paul Gustard

Player of the Match:
(Australia) Will Skelton (Saracens)

Assistant referees:
(England) Roy Maybank (RFU)
(England) Anthony Woodthorpe (RFU)
Television match official:
(England) David Grashoff (RFU)

=== The Showdown 1 (2020) ===
The first edition of The Showdown, contested between Saracens and Harlequins, was originally scheduled for the final weekend of March 2020. However, the outbreak of COVID-19 forced its delay until August 2020 and prevented it from being held at the Tottenham Hotspur Stadium. Hosted instead at Barnet Copthall, Saracens won the match with a bonus point, by a score of 38–24.

22 August 2020
12:30

| Saracens | 38–24 | Harlequins |
| Try: Maitland 3' m Itoje 33' c Davies 40' c Lewington 76' c Con: Farrell (3/4) 34', 40', 77'; Pen: Farrell (4/4) 14', 45', 57', 64' | Report | Try: Lasike (2) 60' c, 75' c Steele 69' c Con: M. Smith (3/3) 60', 70', 75'; Drop: M. Smith (1/1) 31' |

Allianz Park
Attendance: 0
Referee: (England) Christophe Ridley (RFU)

Team details

| FB | 15 | (England) Elliott Obatoyinbo |
| RW | 14 | (England) Alex Lewington |
| OC | 13 | (England) Dom Morris | (substituted off) 47' |
| IC | 12 | (England) Brad Barritt (c) | (substituted off) 64' |
| LW | 11 | (Scotland) Sean Maitland |
| FH | 10 | (England) Owen Farrell |
| SH | 9 | (Wales) Aled Davies | (substituted off) 69' |
| N8 | 8 | (England) Billy Vunipola |
| OF | 7 | (England) Jackson Wray |
| BF | 6 | (South Africa) Michael Rhodes | (substituted off) 59' |
| RL | 5 | (Scotland) Callum Hunter-Hill | (substituted off) 42' |
| LL | 4 | (England) Maro Itoje |
| TP | 3 | (South Africa) Vincent Koch | (substituted off) 65' |
| HK | 2 | (England) Jamie George | (substituted off) 69' |
| LP | 1 | (England) Sam Crean | (substituted off) 59' |
Substitutions:
| HK | 16 | (England) Tom Woolstencroft | (substituted on) 69' |
| PR | 17 | (England) Richard Barrington | (substituted on) 59' |
| PR | 18 | (England) Josh Ibuanokpe | (substituted on) 65' |
| LK | 19 | (Scotland) Tim Swinson | (substituted on) 42' |
| FL | 20 | (England) Sean Reffell | (substituted on) 59' |
| SH | 21 | (England) Tom Whiteley | (substituted on) 69' |
| CE | 22 | (Argentina) Juan Pablo Socino | (substituted on) 47' |
| FH | 23 | (England) Manu Vunipola | (substituted on) 64' |
Coach:
(Ireland) Mark McCall

| FB | 15 | (England) Mike Brown |
| RW | 14 | (England) Aaron Morris |
| OC | 13 | (England) Joe Marchant |
| IC | 12 | (Scotland) James Lang | (substituted off) 56' |
| LW | 11 | (England) Nathan Earle |
| FH | 10 | (England) Marcus Smith |
| SH | 9 | (Argentina) Martín Landajo | (substituted off) 54' |
| N8 | 8 | (England) Alex Dombrandt |
| OF | 7 | (England) Chris Robshaw (c) |
| BF | 6 | (England) James Chisholm | (substituted off) 56' |
| RL | 5 | (South Africa) Stephan Lewies | (substituted off) 51' |
| LL | 4 | (England) Matt Symons |
| TP | 3 | (South Africa) Simon Kerrod | (substituted off) 65' |
| HK | 2 | (Wales) Scott Baldwin | (substituted off) 65' |
| LP | 1 | (England) Joe Marler |
Substitutions:
| HK | 16 | (England) Joe Gray | (substituted on) 65' |
| PR | 17 | (Argentina) Santiago García Botta |
| PR | 18 | (England) Will Collier | (substituted on) 65' |
| LK | 19 | (England) Dino Lamb | (substituted on) 51' |
| FL | 20 | (England) Tom Lawday | (substituted on) 56' |
| FL | 21 | (England) Will Evans |
| SH | 22 | (Scotland) Scott Steele | (substituted on) 54' |
| CE | 23 | (United States) Paul Lasike | (substituted on) 56' |
Coach:
(England) Paul Gustard

Player of the Match:
(England) Owen Farrell (Saracens)

Assistant referees:
(England) Paul Dix (RFU)
(England) Jamie Leahy (RFU)
Television match official:
(England) Geoff Warren (RFU)

=== The Showdown 2 (2022) ===
The second edition of The Showdown, contested between Saracens and Bristol Bears, finally saw the event's debut at Tottenham Hotspur Stadium in March 2022, a week after the end of the 2022 Six Nations Championship. Televised live on BT Sport, Saracens emerged victorious with a score of 27–23.

26 March 2022
15:00

| Saracens | 27–23 | Bristol Bears |
| Try: Malins (2) 11' c, 45' c Daly 39' c Con: Farrell (3/3) 12', 40', 46'; Pen: Farrell (2/2) 27', 30' | Report | Try: Frisch 3' c O'Conor 24' m Eden 37' m Con: Eden (1/3) 4'; Pen: Eden (1/1) 33'; Sheedy (1/1) 62' |

Tottenham Hotspur Stadium
Attendance: 49,376
Referee: (England) Christophe Ridley (RFU)

Team details

| FB | 15 | (England) Alex Goode |
| RW | 14 | (England) Max Malins |
| OC | 13 | (England) Alex Lozowski | (substituted off) 65' |
| IC | 12 | (Wales) Nick Tompkins |
| LW | 11 | (England) Elliot Daly |
| FH | 10 | (England) Owen Farrell (c) | (substituted off) 69' |
| SH | 9 | (Wales) Aled Davies |
| N8 | 8 | (England) Billy Vunipola |
| OF | 7 | (England) Ben Earl | 20' to 24' |
| BF | 6 | (England) Jackson Wray | | | (substituted off) 55' |
| RL | 5 | (England) Nick Isiekwe | (substituted off) 70' |
| LL | 4 | (England) Maro Itoje |
| TP | 3 | (South Africa) Vincent Koch |
| HK | 2 | (England) Jamie George | (substituted off) 59' |
| LP | 1 | (England) Richard Barrington | (substituted off) 63' |
Substitutions:
| HK | 16 | (England) Tom Woolstencroft | (substituted on) 59' |
| PR | 17 | (Fiji) Eroni Mawi | (substituted on) 63' |
| PR | 18 | (Wales) Sam Wainwright |
| LK | 19 | (Scotland) Tim Swinson | (substituted on) 70' |
| FL | 20 | (Scotland) Andy Christie | (substituted on) 20' | (substituted off) 24' | (substituted on) 55' |
| SH | 21 | (United States) Ruben de Haas |
| CE | 22 | (Scotland) Duncan Taylor | (substituted on) 65' |
| WG | 23 | (Scotland) Sean Maitland | (substituted on) 69' |
Coach:
(Ireland) Mark McCall

| FB | 15 | (England) Richard Lane | (substituted off) 46' |
| RW | 14 | (Samoa) Alapati Leiua |
| OC | 13 | (England) Piers O'Conor |
| IC | 12 | (France) Antoine Frisch | (substituted off) 46' |
| LW | 11 | (England) Jack Bates |
| FH | 10 | (England) Tiff Eden | (substituted off) 53' |
| SH | 9 | (England) Harry Randall |
| N8 | 8 | (England) Fitz Harding |
| OF | 7 | (Wales) Dan Thomas | (substituted off) 58' |
| BF | 6 | (Samoa) Chris Vui |
| RL | 5 | (Ireland) Joe Joyce (c) |
| LL | 4 | (England) Dave Attwood |
| TP | 3 | (England) Jake Armstrong | (substituted off) 34' |
| HK | 2 | (England) Harry Thacker | (substituted off) 80' |
| LP | 1 | (England) Jake Woolmore | (substituted off) 66' |
Substitutions:
| HK | 16 | (Scotland) Jake Kerr | (substituted on) 80' |
| PR | 17 | (England) Yann Thomas | (substituted on) 66' |
| PR | 18 | (New Zealand) John Afoa | (substituted on) 34' |
| FL | 19 | (England) Sam Jeffries | (substituted on) 58' |
| SH | 20 | (England) Max Green |
| FH | 21 | (Wales) Callum Sheedy | (substituted on) 53' |
| CE | 22 | (Fiji) Semi Radradra | (substituted on) 46' |
| FB | 23 | (Tonga) Charles Piutau | (substituted on) 46' |
Coach:
(Samoa) Pat Lam

Player of the Match:
(England) Ben Earl (Saracens)

Assistant referees:
(England) Wayne Falla (RFU)
(England) Dan Jones (RFU)
Television match official:
(Ireland) Brian MacNeice (IRFU)

=== The Showdown 3 (2023) ===
The third edition of The Showdown, contested between Saracens and Harlequins, again took place one week on from the conclusion of the 2023 Six Nations Championship. Saracens achieved a bonus-point victory, with a score of 36–24, which also secured them a home berth in the 2022–23 Premiership play-offs. The game notably recorded the largest match-day attendance of the entire 2022–23 regular season. Broadcast simultaneously on both BT Sport and ITV, it also set a new viewership record, drawing the biggest ever audience for a Premiership match.

25 March 2023
15:00

| Saracens | 36–24 | Harlequins |
| Try: Lozowski 8' c Tompkins 13' c Christie 37' m Maitland 57' c Itoje 65' c Con: Farrell (4/5) 8', 15', 58', 67'; Pen: Farrell (1/1) 21' | Report | Try: Dombrandt 2' c Murley (2) 44' c, 61' m Marchant 73' m Con: M. Smith (2/4) 3', 45' |

Tottenham Hotspur Stadium
Attendance: 55,109
Referee: (England) Luke Pearce (RFU)

Team details

| FB | 15 | (England) Alex Goode |
| RW | 14 | (England) Max Malins |
| OC | 13 | (England) Alex Lozowski |
| IC | 12 | (Wales) Nick Tompkins |
| LW | 11 | (Scotland) Sean Maitland | | (substituted off) 58' |
| FH | 10 | (England) Owen Farrell (c) | | (substituted off) 69' |
| SH | 9 | (South Africa) Ivan van Zyl | | 21' to 32' (substituted off) 66' |
| N8 | 8 | (England) Billy Vunipola |
| OF | 7 | (England) Ben Earl | | (substituted off) 73' |
| BF | 6 | (Scotland) Andy Christie | (yellow card) 70' |
| RL | 5 | (England) Hugh Tizard | | (substituted off) 62' |
| LL | 4 | (England) Maro Itoje |
| TP | 3 | (Italy) Marco Riccioni | | (substituted off) 66' |
| HK | 2 | (England) Jamie George | | (substituted off) 73' |
| LP | 1 | (England) Mako Vunipola | | (substituted off) 62' |
Substitutions:
| HK | 16 | (England) Theo Dan | | (substituted on) 73' |
| PR | 17 | (Fiji) Eroni Mawi | | (substituted on) 62' |
| PR | 18 | (England) Alec Clarey | | (substituted on) 66' |
| LK | 19 | (England) Nick Isiekwe | | (substituted on) 62' |
| FL | 20 | (England) Jackson Wray | | (substituted on) 73' |
| SH | 21 | (Wales) Aled Davies | | (substituted on) 21' | (substituted off) 32' (substituted on) 66' |
| CE | 22 | (Scotland) Duncan Taylor | | (substituted on) 69' |
| WG | 23 | (England) Alex Lewington | | (substituted on) 58' |
Coach:
(Ireland) Mark McCall

| FB | 15 | (England) Nick David |
| RW | 14 | (England) Joe Marchant |
| OC | 13 | (England) Luke Northmore | (yellow card) 63' |
| IC | 12 | (South Africa) André Esterhuizen |
| LW | 11 | (England) Cadan Murley | | (substituted off) 74' |
| FH | 10 | (England) Marcus Smith |
| SH | 9 | (England) Danny Care (c) | (yellow card) 19' |
| N8 | 8 | (England) Alex Dombrandt |
| OF | 7 | (England) James Chisholm | | (substituted off) 57' |
| BF | 6 | (England) Jack Kenningham |
| RL | 5 | (South Africa) Irné Herbst | | (substituted off) 57' |
| LL | 4 | (England) Dino Lamb |
| TP | 3 | (South Africa) Wilco Louw | | (substituted off) 62' |
| HK | 2 | (England) Jack Walker | | (substituted off) 66' |
| LP | 1 | (England) Joe Marler | | (substituted off) 74' |
Substitutions:
| HK | 16 | (England) Sam Riley | | (substituted on) 66' |
| PR | 17 | (England) Fin Baxter | | (substituted on) 74' |
| PR | 18 | (England) Will Collier | | (substituted on) 62' |
| LK | 19 | (England) George Hammond | | (substituted on) 57' |
| FL | 20 | (England) Will Evans | | (substituted on) 57' |
| SH | 21 | (Scotland) Scott Steele |
| FH | 22 | (Italy) Tommaso Allan |
| CE | 23 | (England) Oscar Beard | | (substituted on) 74' |
Coach:
(New Zealand) Tabai Matson

Player of the Match:
(England) Billy Vunipola (Saracens)

Assistant referees:
(England) Dan Jones (RFU)
(England) Jamie Leahy (RFU)
Television match official:
(England) Andrew Jackson (RFU)

=== The Showdown 4 (2024) ===
The fourth edition of The Showdown saw Saracens face off against Harlequins for the second year in a row – taking place when the 2023–24 Premiership season resumed, one weekend after the 2024 Six Nations Championship had concluded. In front of their biggest crowd at the Tottenham Hotspur Stadium to date, Saracens achieved their largest ever victory over Harlequins, with a score of 52–7.

A new individual record was also set during the match, as Saracens fly-half and captain Owen Farrell, on the occasion of his 250th appearance for the club, brought his total career points tally against Harlequins to 278 – the most ever by one player against a single Premiership team. As with the previous year, the fixture's simultaneous live broadcasts on ITV and TNT Sports broke Premiership television audience records, this time drawing the highest average viewership in the competition's history, at 913,000 people.

23 March 2024
15:05

| Saracens | 52–7 | Harlequins |
| Try: Lewington 3' c Dan (2) 13' c, 44' c Maitland (2) 17' m, 27' m Cinti 62' c González 68' c Goode 71' c Con: Farrell (6/8) 4', 15', 45', 63', 69', 73' | Report | Try: Dombrandt 51' c Con: M. Smith (1/1) 52' |

Tottenham Hotspur Stadium
Attendance: 61,214
Referee: (England) Christophe Ridley (RFU)

Team details

| FB | 15 | (England) Elliot Daly | | (substituted off) 64' |
| RW | 14 | (Scotland) Sean Maitland |
| OC | 13 | (Argentina) Lucio Cinti |
| IC | 12 | (Wales) Nick Tompkins |
| LW | 11 | (England) Alex Lewington | (yellow card) 79' |
| FH | 10 | (England) Owen Farrell (c) |
| SH | 9 | (South Africa) Ivan van Zyl | | (substituted off) 68' |
| N8 | 8 | (England) Billy Vunipola | | (substituted off) 52' |
| OF | 7 | (England) Ben Earl | | (substituted off) 64' |
| BF | 6 | (Argentina) Juan Martín González |
| RL | 5 | (England) Hugh Tizard | | (substituted off) 56' |
| LL | 4 | (Samoa) Theo McFarland |
| TP | 3 | (England) Christian Judge | | (substituted off) 50' |
| HK | 2 | (England) Theo Dan | | (substituted off) 50' |
| LP | 1 | (England) Mako Vunipola | | (substituted off) 50' |
Substitutions:
| HK | 16 | (England) Jamie George | | (substituted on) 50' |
| PR | 17 | (Fiji) Eroni Mawi | | (substituted on) 50' |
| PR | 18 | (Italy) Marco Riccioni | | (substituted on) 50' |
| LK | 19 | (England) Nick Isiekwe | | (substituted on) 56' |
| N8 | 20 | (England) Tom Willis | | (substituted on) 64' |
| FL | 21 | (Scotland) Andy Christie | | (substituted on) 52' |
| SH | 22 | (England) Gareth Simpson | | (substituted on) 68' |
| FB | 23 | (England) Alex Goode | | (substituted on) 64' |
Coach:
(Ireland) Mark McCall

| FB | 15 | (South Africa) Tyrone Green |
| RW | 14 | (Italy) Louis Lynagh | | (substituted off) 61' |
| OC | 13 | (England) Oscar Beard | | (substituted off) 61' |
| IC | 12 | (South Africa) André Esterhuizen |
| LW | 11 | (England) Cadan Murley |
| FH | 10 | (England) Marcus Smith |
| SH | 9 | (England) Danny Care | (yellow card) 68' |
| N8 | 8 | (England) Alex Dombrandt |
| OF | 7 | (England) Will Evans |
| BF | 6 | (South Africa) Stephan Lewies (c) | (yellow card) 13' | (substituted off) 72' |
| RL | 5 | (England) George Hammond |
| LL | 4 | (England) Joe Launchbury | | (substituted off) 52' |
| TP | 3 | (England) Will Collier | | (substituted off) 52' |
| HK | 2 | (England) Jack Walker | | (substituted off) 61' |
| LP | 1 | (England) Joe Marler | | (substituted off) 52' |
Substitutions:
| HK | 16 | (England) Sam Riley | | (substituted on) 61' |
| PR | 17 | (England) Fin Baxter | | (substituted on) 52' |
| PR | 18 | (Wales) Dillon Lewis | | (substituted on) 52' |
| LK | 19 | (South Africa) Irné Herbst | | (substituted on) 52' |
| FL | 20 | (England) Will Trenholm | | (substituted on) 72' |
| SH | 21 | (England) Max Green | | | (substituted on) 64' |
| CE | 22 | (England) Luke Northmore | | (substituted on) 61' |
| WG | 23 | (England) Nick David | | (substituted on) 61' | (substituted off) 64' |
Coach:
(Australia) Billy Millard

Player of the Match:
(England) Elliot Daly (Saracens)

Assistant referees:
(England) Simon Harding (RFU)
(England) Joe James (RFU)
Television match official:
(England) Stuart Terheege (RFU)

=== The Showdown 5 (2025) ===
For the third year running, Saracens welcomed Harlequins to the Tottenham Hotspur Stadium for the fifth edition of The Showdown – stylised as 'THE 5HOWDOWN'. The match coincided with one of two designated 'Derby Weekends' scheduled during the 2024–25 season, which exclusively feature matches between local rivals.

22 March 2025
15:05

| Saracens | 12–23 | Harlequins |
| Try: McFarland 4' c Elliott 38' m Con: Lozowski (1/2) 5' | Report | Try: Waghorn 59' c Porter 78' c Con: Benson (2/2) 60', 79'; Pen: Benson (3/3) 67', 70', 76' |

Tottenham Hotspur Stadium
Attendance: 54,414
Referee: (England) Adam Leal (RFU)

Team details

| FB | 15 | (England) Elliot Daly |
| RW | 14 | (England) Tobias Elliott |
| OC | 13 | (England) Alex Lozowski |
| IC | 12 | (Wales) Nick Tompkins | (substituted off) 58' |
| LW | 11 | (England) Rotimi Segun | (substituted off) 18' |
| FH | 10 | (New Zealand) Fergus Burke |
| SH | 9 | (South Africa) Ivan van Zyl |
| N8 | 8 | (England) Tom Willis | (substituted off) 72' |
| OF | 7 | (Argentina) Juan Martín González |
| BF | 6 | (Samoa) Theo McFarland | (substituted off) 68' |
| RL | 5 | (England) Hugh Tizard | (substituted off) 50' |
| LL | 4 | (England) Maro Itoje (c) |
| TP | 3 | (Italy) Marco Riccioni | (substituted off) 67' |
| HK | 2 | (England) Jamie George | (substituted off) 50' |
| LP | 1 | (Fiji) Eroni Mawi | (substituted off) 50' | (substituted on) 77' |
Substitutions:
| HK | 16 | (England) Theo Dan | (substituted on) 50' |
| PR | 17 | (England) Phil Brantingham | (substituted on) 50' | (substituted off) 77' |
| PR | 18 | (England) Alec Clarey | (substituted on) 67' |
| LK | 19 | (England) Nick Isiekwe | (substituted on) 50' |
| FL | 20 | (Scotland) Andy Onyeama-Christie | (substituted on) 58' |
| FL | 21 | (England) Nathan Michelow | (substituted on) 72' |
| SH | 22 | (England) Gareth Simpson | (substituted on) 68' |
| FB | 23 | (England) Alex Goode | (substituted on) 18' |
Coach:
(Ireland) Mark McCall

| FB | 15 | (Wales) Leigh Halfpenny | | | (substituted off) 56' |
| RW | 14 | (Argentina) Rodrigo Isgró |
| OC | 13 | (England) Oscar Beard |
| IC | 12 | (England) Ben Waghorn |
| LW | 11 | (England) Nick David | (substituted off) 2' | (substituted on) 16' |
| FH | 10 | (Wales) Jarrod Evans | (substituted off) 40' |
| SH | 9 | (England) Will Porter |
| N8 | 8 | (England) Alex Dombrandt (c) |
| OF | 7 | (England) Will Evans |
| BF | 6 | (England) Jack Kenningham |
| RL | 5 | (South Africa) Stephan Lewies |
| LL | 4 | (England) Joe Launchbury | (substituted off) 48' |
| TP | 3 | (Samoa) Titi Lamositele | (substituted off) 65' |
| HK | 2 | (England) Jack Walker | (substituted off) 62' |
| LP | 1 | (Wales) Wyn Jones | (substituted off) 53' |
Substitutions:
| HK | 16 | (England) Sam Riley | (substituted on) 62' |
| PR | 17 | (South Africa) Jordan Els | (substituted on) 53' |
| PR | 18 | (England) Will Hobson | (substituted on) 65' |
| LK | 19 | (South Africa) Irné Herbst | (substituted on) 48' |
| LK | 20 | (England) George Hammond |
| SH | 21 | (England) Jake Murray |
| FH | 22 | (England) Jamie Benson | (substituted on) 40' |
| FB | 23 | (South Africa) Tyrone Green | (substituted on) 2' | (substituted off) 16' | (substituted on) 56' |
Coach:
(England) Danny Wilson

Assistant referees:
(England) Luke Pearce (RFU)
(England) John Meredith (RFU)
Television match official:
(England) Peter Allan (RFU)

=== The Showdown 6 (2026) ===
After facing London rivals Harlequins for three consecutive seasons, Saracens announced that its marquee fixture for the 2025–26 season would feature a new opponent, Northampton Saints, who will visit the Tottenham Hotspur Stadium for the first time.

28 March 2026
18:00

| Saracens | 17–21 | Northampton Saints |
| Try: Elliott 21' c Dan 44' c Con: Farrell (2/2) 22', 45'; Pen: Burke (1/1) 72' | Report | Try: Litchfield 6' c McParland (2) 12' c, 77' c Con: Smith (2/2) 7', 13'; Hutchinson (1/1) 78' |

Tottenham Hotspur Stadium
Referee: (England) Anthony Woodthorpe (RFU)

Team details

| FB | 15 | (England) Elliot Daly |
| RW | 14 | (England) Tobias Elliott |
| OC | 13 | (Argentina) Lucio Cinti |
| IC | 12 | (Wales) Nick Tompkins |
| LW | 11 | (England) Rotimi Segun | (substituted off) 69' |
| FH | 10 | (England) Owen Farrell | (substituted off) 69' |
| SH | 9 | (England) Charlie Bracken | (substituted off) 64' |
| N8 | 8 | (England) Tom Willis | (substituted off) 55' |
| OF | 7 | (Scotland) Andy Onyeama-Christie |
| BF | 6 | (Samoa) Theo McFarland | (substituted off) 62' |
| RL | 5 | (England) Hugh Tizard |
| LL | 4 | (England) Maro Itoje (c) |
| TP | 3 | (England) Marcus Street | (substituted off) 50' |
| HK | 2 | (England) Theo Dan | (substituted off) 50' |
| LP | 1 | (Wales) Rhys Carré | (substituted off) 50' |
Substitutions:
| HK | 16 | (England) Jamie George | (substituted on) 50' |
| PR | 17 | (Fiji) Eroni Mawi | (substituted on) 50' |
| PR | 18 | (Italy) Marco Riccioni | (substituted on) 50' |
| LK | 19 | (England) Nick Isiekwe | (substituted on) 62' |
| FL | 20 | (England) Nathan Michelow | (substituted on) 55' |
| SH | 21 | (South Africa) Ivan van Zyl | (substituted on) 64' |
| FH | 22 | (Scotland) Fergus Burke | (substituted on) 69' |
| FB | 23 | (England) Max Malins | (substituted on) 69' |
Coach:
(Ireland) Mark McCall

| FB | 15 | (England) George Furbank (c) |
| RW | 14 | (England) Tommy Freeman |
| OC | 13 | (England) Tom Litchfield |
| IC | 12 | (Scotland) Rory Hutchinson |
| LW | 11 | (Australia) James Ramm |
| FH | 10 | (England) Fin Smith | (substituted off) 29' |
| SH | 9 | (England) Archie McParland |
| N8 | 8 | (England) Henry Pollock |
| OF | 7 | (England) Tom Pearson |
| BF | 6 | (Australia) Josh Kemeny | (substituted off) 66' |
| RL | 5 | (England) Ed Prowse | (substituted off) 50' |
| LL | 4 | (England) Tom Lockett | (substituted off) 72' |
| TP | 3 | (England) Luke Green | (substituted off) 50' |
| HK | 2 | (England) Curtis Langdon | (substituted off) 55' |
| LP | 1 | (England) Emmanuel Iyogun | (substituted off) 26' |
Substitutions:
| HK | 16 | (England) Craig Wright | (substituted on) 55' |
| PR | 17 | (Italy) Danilo Fischetti | (substituted on) 26' |
| PR | 18 | (England) Trevor Davison | (substituted on) 50' |
| LK | 19 | (South Africa) JJ van der Mescht | (substituted on) 50' |
| LK | 20 | (England) Chunya Munga | (substituted on) 72' |
| N8 | 21 | (England) Callum Chick | (substituted on) 66' |
| SH | 22 | (England) Jonny Weimann |
| CE | 23 | (England) Fraser Dingwall | (substituted on) 29' |
Coach:
(England) Phil Dowson

Assistant referees:
(England) Christophe Ridley (RFU)
(England) Wayne Falla (RFU)
Television match official:
(England) Karl Dickson (RFU)

== Saracens vs South Africa (2009 exhibition match) ==
Saracens vs South Africa
- Event: 2009 Autumn Series
| Saracens | South Africa |
| (England) | (South Africa) |
| 24 | 23 |
- Date: 17 November 2009
- Venue: Wembley Stadium, London
- Man of the Match: (South Africa) Wikus van Heerden (Saracens)
- Referee: (Wales) James Jones (WRU)
- Attendance: 46,281

In September 2009, Saracens scheduled a special exhibition friendly against South Africa at Wembley Stadium in November – coinciding with the 2009 autumn internationals, during which the Springboks had lined up a tour of the Northern Hemisphere. The announcement followed investment into Saracens earlier in 2009 by a South African consortium, which included former Springbok captains Francois Pienaar and Morné du Plessis. The new investors stated that the game was part of their objective to expand the club's supporter base, by tapping into the UK's South African expatriate community, and a number of players from the country were recruited to join Saracens ahead of the 2009–10 Premiership season, under South African director of rugby Brendan Venter.

The exhibition match took place on 17 November 2009, in front of a then-record live crowd for a Saracens fixture, with a total of 46,281 people in attendance. For the game, Saracens selected 10 South Africa-born players in their 22-man matchday squad. Overcoming a 12-point half-time deficit, Saracens eventually claimed a 24–23 victory, with former Springbok fly-half Derick Hougaard kicking the winning drop goal for the London club.

To date, this remains the only rugby union fixture to be contested between Saracens and South Africa, despite suggestions of a potential rematch over the subsequent years. Another exhibition game between the club and South African side Stormers at Tottenham Hotspur Stadium had been announced for an unconfirmed date in 2021, but this event ultimately never came to fruition, because of the COVID-19 pandemic.

17 November 2009
19:45

| Saracens (England) | 24–23 | South Africa |
| Try: Joubert 45' m Barritt 53' c Con: D. Hougaard (1/2) 54'; Pen: D. Hougaard (3) 1', 40+1', 68'; Drop: D. Hougaard 74' | Report | Try: De Jongh 28' m Nokwe (2) 37' c, 62' m Con: Pienaar (1/3) 38'; Pen: Pienaar (2) 2', 16' |

Team details

| FB | 15 | (England) Michael Horak | (substituted off) 49' |
| RW | 14 | (England) Noah Cato | (substituted off) 41' |
| OC | 13 | (Fiji) Kameli Ratuvou |
| IC | 12 | (England) Brad Barritt |
| LW | 11 | (Fiji) Michael Tagicakibau |
| FH | 10 | (South Africa) Derick Hougaard |
| SH | 9 | (South Africa) Neil de Kock | (substituted off) 38' |
| N8 | 8 | (South Africa) Ernst Joubert |
| OF | 7 | (Germany) Justin Melck | (substituted off) 47' |
| BF | 6 | (South Africa) Wikus van Heerden |
| RL | 5 | (South Africa) Mouritz Botha |
| LL | 4 | (England) Hugh Vyvyan (c) |
| TP | 3 | (England) Richard Skuse | (substituted off) 49' |
| HK | 2 | (South Africa) Ethienne Reynecke | (substituted off) 41' |
| LP | 1 | (Wales) Rhys Gill |
Substitutions:
| HK | 16 | (South Africa) Schalk Brits | (substituted on) 41' |
| PR | 17 | (Italy) Carlos Nieto | (substituted on) 49' |
| LK | 18 | (England) George Kruis |
| FL | 19 | (England) Andy Saull | (substituted on) 47' |
| SH | 20 | (England) Kevin Barrett | (substituted on) 38' |
| FB | 21 | (England) Alex Goode | (substituted on) 49' |
| WG | 22 | (England) Rodd Penney | (substituted on) 41' |
Coach:
(South Africa) Brendan Venter

| FB | 15 | (South Africa) Earl Rose |
| RW | 14 | (South Africa) Odwa Ndungane |
| OC | 13 | (South Africa) Juan de Jongh |
| IC | 12 | (South Africa) Wynand Olivier | (substituted off) 68' |
| LW | 11 | (South Africa) Jongi Nokwe |
| FH | 10 | (South Africa) Ruan Pienaar (c) | (substituted off) 68' |
| SH | 9 | (South Africa) Heini Adams | (substituted off) 41' |
| N8 | 8 | (South Africa) Ashley Johnson | (substituted off) 68' |
| OF | 7 | (South Africa) Dewald Potgieter |
| BF | 6 | (South Africa) Jean Deysel |
| RL | 5 | (South Africa) Andries Bekker | (substituted off) 41' |
| LL | 4 | (South Africa) Alistair Hargreaves |
| TP | 3 | (South Africa) CJ van der Linde | (substituted off) 10' |
| HK | 2 | (South Africa) Adriaan Strauss | (substituted off) 68' |
| LP | 1 | (South Africa) Heinke van der Merwe |
Substitutions:
| HK | 16 | (South Africa) Bandise Maku | (substituted on) 68' |
| PR | 17 | (South Africa) Wian du Preez | (substituted on) 10' |
| LK | 18 | (South Africa) Danie Rossouw | (substituted on) 41' |
| FL | 19 | (South Africa) Davon Raubenheimer | (substituted on) 68' |
| SH | 20 | (South Africa) Francois Hougaard | (substituted on) 41' |
| FH | 21 | (South Africa) Meyer Bosman | (substituted on) 68' |
| FB | 22 | (South Africa) Riaan Viljoen | (substituted on) 68' |
Coach:
(South Africa) Peter de Villiers

== Women's rugby ==
As with their male counterparts, Saracens Women and Harlequins Women established a strong rivalry in Premiership Women's Rugby (formerly known as Premier 15s), having finished in the top two and competed in the play-off final in three consecutive seasons. During the 2019–20 season, Saracens announced that their home fixture against Harlequins would become an annual showpiece event under the banner of 'The Duel' – however, the first of these games, which was originally scheduled for April 2020, was cancelled, after the entire season was abandoned, due to the COVID-19 pandemic.

The launch of The Duel eventually took place at the StoneX Stadium during the 2020–21 season, and it became a recurring fixture in the league calendar for each season thereafter. Subsequently, the match adopted the new title of 'The London Derby', in the lead up to the 2025–26 season.

For the 2025–26 season, alongside The London Derby, it was announced that Saracens Women would also compete in The Showdown at Tottenham Hotspur Stadium for the first time. They will face off against Sale Sharks Women in March 2026, in what will serve as the opening match of a double-header with the men's team.

=== Results summary ===
The following table outlines the results of each showpiece match hosted by Saracens Women in Premiership Women's Rugby:

Winning teams are listed in bold and tied results are listed in italics

| Season | Round | Date | Host | Score | Opponent | Stadium | Attendance |
The London Derby
| 2020–21 | 16 | 27 March 2021 | Saracens | 17–17 | Harlequins | StoneX Stadium | — |
| 2021–22 | 8 | 12 December 2021 | Saracens | 17–36 | **Harlequins** | StoneX Stadium | — |
| 2022–23 | 11 | 18 February 2023 | **Saracens** | 32–12 | Harlequins | StoneX Stadium | 2,992 |
| 2023–24 | 11 | 10 February 2024 | **Saracens** | 29–24 | Harlequins | StoneX Stadium | 3,071 |
| 2024–25 | 7 | 24 November 2024 | Saracens | 14–15 | **Harlequins** | StoneX Stadium | — |
| 2025–26 | 2 | 2 November 2025 | **Saracens** | 47–10 | Harlequins | StoneX Stadium | 3,733 |
The Showdown
| 2025–26 | 16 | 28 March 2026 | **Saracens** | 54–0 | Sale | Tottenham Hotspur Stadium | 16,001 |

=== Match details ===
==== The Duel 1 (2021) ====
Saracens and Harlequins contested The Duel for the first time in March 2021. Due to temporary law changes implemented for the 2020–21 Premier 15s season, this was the only instance that the showpiece fixture had a 70-minute duration, rather than the usual 80 minutes. The match ultimately concluded in a 17–17 draw.

27 March 2021
14:00

| **Saracens Women** | **17–17** | **Harlequins Women** |
| Try: P. Cleall 19' c Campbell 51' c Con: Harrison (2) 20', 51'; Pen: Harrison 70+1' | Report | Try: Fletcher 46' c Riley 63' c Con: Green (2) 47', 63'; Pen: Green 24' |

StoneX Stadium
Referee: (England) Charles Gayther (RFU)

Team details

| FB | 15 | (England) Sarah McKenna |
| RW | 14 | (England) Emma Uren |
| OC | 13 | (Ireland) Hannah Casey | | (substituted off) 49' |
| IC | 12 | (Scotland) Lisa Martin | | (substituted off) 49' |
| LW | 11 | (England) Lotte Clapp (c) |
| FH | 10 | (England) Zoe Harrison |
| SH | 9 | (England) Emma Swords | | (substituted off) 69' |
| N8 | 8 | (England) Poppy Cleall |
| OF | 7 | (England) Vicky Fleetwood | | (substituted off) 32' |
| BF | 6 | (Wales) Georgia Evans | (yellow card) 57' |
| RL | 5 | (Canada) Emma Taylor | | (substituted off) 60' |
| LL | 4 | (Canada) Sophie de Goede |
| TP | 3 | (Wales) Donna Rose | | (substituted off) 41' |
| HK | 2 | (England) May Campbell |
| LP | 1 | (England) Rocky Clark | | (substituted off) 52' |
Substitutions:
| LK | 16 | (England) Sonia Green |
| PR | 17 | (England) Kelsey Clifford | | (substituted on) 52' |
| PR | 18 | (England) Bryony Cleall | | (substituted on) 41' |
| LK | 19 | (England) Tamara Taylor | | (substituted on) 60' |
| LK | 20 | (England) Rosie Galligan | | (substituted on) 32' |
| SH | 21 | (England) Eloise Hayward | | (substituted on) 69' |
| CE | 22 | (Canada) Alysha Corrigan | | (substituted on) 49' |
| WG | 23 | (England) Chantelle Miell | | (substituted on) 49' |
Coach:
(England) Alex Austerberry

| FB | 15 | (England) Emily Scott |
| RW | 14 | (England) Heather Cowell | (substituted off) 53' |
| OC | 13 | (England) Izzy Mayhew |
| IC | 12 | (England) Lagi Tuima |
| LW | 11 | (England) Jess Breach |
| FH | 10 | (England) Ellie Green |
| SH | 9 | (England) Leanne Riley |
| N8 | 8 | (England) Katy Mew | (substituted off) 53' |
| OF | 7 | (England) Emily Robinson |
| BF | 6 | (England) Lauren Brooks |
| RL | 5 | (England) Fiona Fletcher |
| LL | 4 | (England) Abbie Ward (c) |
| TP | 3 | (England) Chloe Edwards |
| HK | 2 | (England) Amy Cokayne |
| LP | 1 | (England) Vickii Cornborough |
Substitutions:
| LK | 16 | (England) Alex Eddie |
| PR | 17 | (Sweden) Tove Viksten |
| PR | 18 | (England) Hannah Duffy |
| LK | 19 | (Wales) Bethan Dainton | (substituted on) 53' |
| CE | 20 | (Wales) Jade Mullen |
| SH | 21 | (England) Lucy Packer |
| CE | 22 | (Belgium) Ella Amory |
| WG | 23 | (England) Beth Wilcock | (substituted on) 53' |
Coach:
(Ireland) Gerard Mullen

==== The Duel 2 (2021) ====
Saracens hosted the second edition of The Duel in December 2021. On this occasion, Harlequins won by a score of 36–17.

12 December 2021
15:00

| **Saracens Women** | **17–36** | **Harlequins Women** |
| Try: Campbell 17' c Botterman 65' c Con: Harrison (2) 18', 65'; Pen: Harrison 29' | Report | Try: Konkel (2) 25' m, 78' c Fletcher 33' c Scott 40+1' c Beckett 50' c Con: Tuima (4) 33', 40+2', 50', 79'; Pen: Tuima 61' |

StoneX Stadium

Team details

| FB | 15 | (England) Chantelle Miell |
| RW | 14 | (Fiji) Raijieli Laqeretabua | | (substituted off) 75' |
| OC | 13 | (Ireland) Hannah Casey | | (substituted off) 67' |
| IC | 12 | (England) Holly Aitchison |
| LW | 11 | (Canada) Alysha Corrigan | | (substituted off) 56' |
| FH | 10 | (England) Zoe Harrison |
| SH | 9 | (England) Ella Wyrwas |
| N8 | 8 | (England) Marlie Packer (c) |
| OF | 7 | (England) Vicky Fleetwood | | (substituted off) 70' |
| BF | 6 | (Wales) Georgia Evans | | (substituted off) 53' |
| RL | 5 | (England) Poppy Cleall | (yellow card) 24' |
| LL | 4 | (England) Fiona McIntosh | | (substituted off) 50' |
| TP | 3 | (England) Kelsey Clifford | | (substituted off) 50' |
| HK | 2 | (England) May Campbell | | (substituted off) 59' |
| LP | 1 | (England) Hannah Botterman |
Substitutions:
| HK | 16 | (Wales) Kat Evans | | (substituted on) 59' |
| PR | 17 | (England) Rocky Clark | | (substituted on) 70' |
| PR | 18 | (Wales) Donna Rose | | (substituted on) 50' |
| PR | 19 | (Canada) Alex Ellis | | (substituted on) 53' |
| LK | 20 | (England) Sonia Green | | (substituted on) 50' |
| FL | 21 | (Scotland) Jodie Rettie | | (substituted on) 67' |
| SH | 22 | (United States) Carly Waters | | (substituted on) 74' |
| WG | 23 | (Scotland) Coreen Grant | | (substituted on) 56' |
Coach:
(England) Alex Austerberry

| FB | 15 | (England) Ellie Kildunne |
| RW | 14 | (England) Heather Cowell | (substituted off) 72' |
| OC | 13 | (England) Lagi Tuima |
| IC | 12 | (England) Rachael Burford (c) |
| LW | 11 | (England) Izzy Mayhew |
| FH | 10 | (England) Emily Scott |
| SH | 9 | (England) Lucy Packer |
| N8 | 8 | (England) Sarah Beckett |
| OF | 7 | (England) Emily Robinson | (substituted off) 56' |
| BF | 6 | (Scotland) Jade Konkel |
| RL | 5 | (England) Fiona Fletcher |
| LL | 4 | (England) Rosie Galligan | (substituted off) 75' |
| TP | 3 | (England) Shaunagh Brown |
| HK | 2 | (England) Amy Cokayne |
| LP | 1 | (England) Vickii Cornborough |
Substitutions:
| HK | 16 | (England) Davinia Catlin |
| PR | 17 | (England) Sheree Cooper |
| PR | 18 | (England) Chloe Edwards |
| FL | 19 | (England) Lauren Brooks | (substituted on) 75' |
| LK | 20 | (England) Alice Sheffield |
| SH | 21 | (England) Emma Swords |
| FL | 22 | (England) Amelia Harper | (substituted on) 56' |
| CE | 23 | (Belgium) Ella Amory | (substituted on) 72' |
Coach:
(Ireland) Gerard Mullen

==== The Duel 3 (2023) ====
Saracens and Harlequins again met for the third incarnation of The Duel in February 2023. Saracens emerged as the victors, with a final score of 32–12. The event set a new club attendance record for a women's rugby home game, recording a live gate of 2,992 people.

18 February 2023
14:00

| **Saracens Women** | **32–12** | **Harlequins Women** |
| Try: Breach 16' m M. Packer 22' m Grant 27' m Harrison 31' m P. Cleall 35' c Rettie 80+1' m Con: Harrison 36' | Report | Try: Tuima 45' c McKenzie 54' m Con: McKenzie 46' |

StoneX Stadium
Attendance: 2,992
Referee: (England) Christophe Ridley (RFU)

Team details

| FB | 15 | (England) Jess Breach |
| RW | 14 | (Scotland) Coreen Grant |
| OC | 13 | (England) Sydney Gregson |
| IC | 12 | (England) Sarah McKenna |
| LW | 11 | (United States) Lotte Clapp (cc) |
| FH | 10 | (England) Zoe Harrison | (substituted off) 60' |
| SH | 9 | (England) Ella Wyrwas | (substituted off) 66' |
| N8 | 8 | (England) Poppy Cleall |
| OF | 7 | (England) Marlie Packer (cc) | (substituted off) 74' |
| BF | 6 | (Wales) Georgia Evans | (substituted off) 69' |
| RL | 5 | (Scotland) Louise McMillan |
| LL | 4 | (Scotland) Fiona McIntosh | (substituted off) 69' |
| TP | 3 | (England) Kelsey Clifford | (substituted off) 78' |
| HK | 2 | (England) May Campbell | (substituted off) 74' |
| LP | 1 | (Canada) Maya Montiel | (substituted off) 51' |
Substitutions:
| HK | 16 | (Scotland) Jodie Rettie | (substituted on) 74' |
| PR | 17 | (England) Mica Gooding | (substituted on) 78' |
| PR | 18 | (Canada) Alex Ellis | (substituted on) 51' |
| LK | 19 | (South Africa) Catha Jacobs | (substituted on) 69' |
| FL | 20 | (England) Sharifa Kasolo | (substituted on) 74' |
| FL | 21 | (Ireland) Grace Moore | (substituted on) 69' |
| SH | 22 | (England) Leanne Infante | (substituted on) 66' |
| CE | 23 | (England) Cara Wardle | (substituted on) 60' |
Coach:
(England) Alex Austerberry

| FB | 15 | (England) Emily Scott |
| RW | 14 | (England) Freya Aucken |
| OC | 13 | (England) Lagi Tuima |
| IC | 12 | (Scotland) Beth Blacklock | (substituted off) 45' |
| LW | 11 | (England) Abby Dow |
| FH | 10 | (Australia) Bella McKenzie |
| SH | 9 | (England) Lucy Packer | (substituted off) 65' |
| N8 | 8 | (England) Emily Robinson |
| OF | 7 | (Australia) Emily Chancellor |
| BF | 6 | (England) Katy Mew | (substituted off) 35' |
| RL | 5 | (Scotland) Sarah Bonar | (substituted off) 58' |
| LL | 4 | (England) Rosie Galligan |
| TP | 3 | (England) Chloe Edwards | (substituted off) 68' |
| HK | 2 | (England) Amy Cokayne (c) |
| LP | 1 | (England) Hannah Sims | (substituted off) 60' |
Substitutions:
| HK | 16 | (England) Rosie Dobson |
| PR | 17 | (England) Sheree Cooper | (substituted on) 60' |
| PR | 18 | (England) Hannah Duffy | (substituted on) 68' |
| LK | 19 | (Australia) Kaitlan Leaney | (substituted on) 58' |
| FL | 20 | (England) Lauren Brooks | (substituted on) 35' |
| SH | 21 | (Ireland) Emma Swords | (substituted on) 65' |
| FH | 22 | (England) Ellie Green |
| CE | 23 | (Belgium) Ella Amory | (substituted on) 45' |
Coach:
(England) Amy Turner

==== The Duel 4 (2024) ====
Saracens announced the return of The Duel for the fourth consecutive season in February 2024, with rivals Harlequins again confirmed as the opponents. Saracens withstood a late Harlequins comeback to claim victory, by a score of 29–24. For the second year in a row, the fixture recorded the largest ever crowd for a Saracens women's home match, exceeding 3,000 attendees at the StoneX Stadium for the first time.

10 February 2024
12:30

| **Saracens Women** | **29–24** | **Harlequins Women** |
| Try: Penalty try 36'; Hunt (3) 39' m, 42' c, 56' c Con: Blacklock (1/2) 43'; Harrison (1/1) 57'; Pen: Harrison (1/1) 80' | Report | Try: Brown 11' c Aucken 62' m Wythe 71' c Layzell 77' m Con: Tuima (1/1) 12'; Cromack (1/3) 72' |

StoneX Stadium
Attendance: 3,071
Referee: (England) Sara Cox (RFU)

Team details

| FB | 15 | (England) Jess Breach |
| RW | 14 | (Canada) Paige Farries |
| OC | 13 | (England) Sydney Gregson |
| IC | 12 | (England) Sarah McKenna | (substituted off) 72' |
| LW | 11 | (United States) Lotte Clapp (cc) |
| FH | 10 | (Scotland) Beth Blacklock | (substituted off) 44' |
| SH | 9 | (England) Leanne Infante |
| N8 | 8 | (England) Poppy Cleall | (substituted off) 60' |
| OF | 7 | (England) Marlie Packer (cc) |
| BF | 6 | (England) Sharifa Kasolo | (substituted off) 72' |
| RL | 5 | (Wales) Georgia Evans |
| LL | 4 | (Scotland) Louise McMillan |
| TP | 3 | (England) Kelsey Clifford | (substituted off) 65' |
| HK | 2 | (England) May Campbell | (substituted off) 57' |
| LP | 1 | (Canada) McKinley Hunt | (substituted off) 65' |
Substitutions:
| HK | 16 | (England) Bryony Field | (substituted on) 57' |
| PR | 17 | (England) Akina Gondwe | (substituted on) 65' |
| PR | 18 | (Wales) Donna Rose | (substituted on) 65' |
| LK | 19 | (Canada) Emma Taylor | (substituted on) 60' |
| FL | 20 | (Ireland) Grace Moore | (substituted on) 72' |
| SH | 21 | (England) Tori Sellors |
| FH | 22 | (England) Zoe Harrison | (substituted on) 44' |
| CE | 23 | (England) Sophie Bridger | (substituted on) 72' |
Coach:
(England) Alex Austerberry

| FB | 15 | (England) Ellie Kildunne |
| RW | 14 | (England) Freya Aucken |
| OC | 13 | (England) Izzy Mayhew | | (substituted off) 53' |
| IC | 12 | (England) Lagi Tuima |
| LW | 11 | (England) Beth Wilcock | | (substituted off) 18' |
| FH | 10 | (England) Emily Scott (c) |
| SH | 9 | (England) Lucy Packer | | (substituted off) 62' |
| N8 | 8 | (England) Shaunagh Brown | | (substituted off) 57' |
| OF | 7 | (England) Emily Robinson |
| BF | 6 | (Wales) Abbie Fleming | (yellow card) 36' |
| RL | 5 | (Scotland) Sarah Bonar | | (substituted off) 65' |
| LL | 4 | (South Africa) Danelle Lochner |
| TP | 3 | (South Africa) Babalwa Latsha | | (substituted off) 66' |
| HK | 2 | (England) Connie Powell | | (substituted off) 62' |
| LP | 1 | (Italy) Silvia Turani | | (substituted off) 75' |
Substitutions:
| HK | 16 | (Wales) Carys Phillips | | (substituted on) 62' |
| PR | 17 | (England) Sheree Cooper | | (substituted on) 75' |
| PR | 18 | (England) Hannah Duffy | | (substituted on) 66' |
| LK | 19 | (Australia) Kaitlan Leaney | | (substituted on) 57' |
| FL | 20 | (England) Nicole Wythe | | (substituted on) 65' |
| SH | 21 | (England) Flo Robinson | | (substituted on) 62' |
| FH | 22 | (England) Ella Cromack | | (substituted on) 53' |
| FB | 23 | (England) Amy Layzell | | (substituted on) 18' |
Coach:
(England) Amy Turner

Player of the Match:
(Canada) McKinley Hunt (Saracens)

Assistant referees:
(England) James Clarke (RFU)
(England) Nikki O'Donnell (RFU)
Television match official:
(England) Dan Jones (RFU)

==== The Duel 5 (2024) ====
Saracens confirmed that the fifth edition of The Duel with Harlequins would take place in November 2024. Harlequins edged the result with a score of 15–14.

24 November 2024
15:00

| **Saracens Women** | **14–15** | **Harlequins Women** |
| Try: Campbell 65' c Harrison 71' c Con: Harrison (2/2) 66', 72' | Report | Try: Wilcock (2) 23' m, 63' m Hanlon 37' m |

StoneX Stadium
Referee: (New Zealand) Richard Gordon (RFU)

Team details

| FB | 15 | (England) Jemma-Jo Linkins | (substituted off) 60' |
| RW | 14 | (Canada) Alysha Corrigan |
| OC | 13 | (England) Sydney Gregson |
| IC | 12 | (England) Sarah McKenna |
| LW | 11 | (United States) Lotte Sharp (cc) |
| FH | 10 | (England) Zoe Harrison |
| SH | 9 | (England) Ella Wyrwas |
| N8 | 8 | (England) Poppy Cleall | (substituted off) 53' |
| OF | 7 | (England) Marlie Packer (cc) |
| BF | 6 | (England) Sharifa Kasolo | (substituted off) 53' |
| RL | 5 | (Wales) Georgia Evans |
| LL | 4 | (England) Rosie Galligan | (substituted off) 40' |
| TP | 3 | (England) Kelsey Clifford | (substituted off) 66' |
| HK | 2 | (England) Bryony Field | (substituted off) 47' |
| LP | 1 | (Canada) McKinley Hunt | (substituted off) 61' |
Substitutions:
| HK | 16 | (England) May Campbell | (substituted on) 47' |
| PR | 17 | (England) Akina Gondwe | (substituted on) 61' |
| PR | 18 | (England) Carmen Tremelling | (substituted on) 66' |
| N8 | 19 | (England) Bryony Cleall | (substituted on) 53' |
| LK | 20 | (Scotland) Louise McMillan | (substituted on) 40' |
| FL | 21 | (Canada) Gabby Senft | (substituted on) 53' |
| FH | 22 | (England) Amelia MacDougall |
| WG | 23 | (Canada) Fancy Bermudez | (substituted on) 60' |
Coach:
(England) Alex Austerberry

| FB | 15 | (Spain) Clàudia Peña |
| RW | 14 | (England) Beth Wilcock | (yellow card) 40' |
| OC | 13 | (England) Sarah Parry |
| IC | 12 | (England) Lagi Tuima |
| LW | 11 | (Wales) Lisa Neumann |
| FH | 10 | (Wales) Kayleigh Powell | (yellow card) 13' |
| SH | 9 | (England) Lucy Packer |
| N8 | 8 | (Scotland) Jade Konkel-Roberts (c) |
| OF | 7 | (Wales) Alex Callender |
| BF | 6 | (England) Nicole Wythe |
| RL | 5 | (Australia) Kaitlan Leaney | | (substituted off) 53' |
| LL | 4 | (Wales) Abbie Fleming | | (substituted off) 53' |
| TP | 3 | (England) Lizzie Hanlon | | (substituted off) 53' |
| HK | 2 | (England) Connie Powell | | (substituted off) 53' |
| LP | 1 | (Italy) Silvia Turani | | 5' to 19' | | (substituted off) 53' |
Substitutions:
| HK | 16 | (Wales) Carys Phillips | | (substituted on) 53' |
| PR | 17 | (Spain) Laura Delgado | | (substituted on) 5' | (substituted off) 19' | (substituted on) 53' |
| PR | 18 | (South Africa) Babalwa Latsha | | (substituted on) 53' |
| LK | 19 | (Scotland) Sarah Bonar | | (substituted on) 53' |
| LK | 20 | (South Africa) Danelle Lochner | | (substituted on) 53' |
| SH | 21 | (England) Freya Aucken |
| FH | 22 | (England) Ella Cromack |
| FL | 23 | (England) Harriet Millar-Mills |
Coach:
(England) Ross Chisholm

Assistant referees:
(England) Calum Howard (RFU)
(England) Holly Wood (RFU)

==== The London Derby (2025) ====
After five years under the moniker of 'The Duel', Saracens rebranded their annual showpiece fixture against local rivals Harlequins as 'The London Derby', ahead of the 2025–26 season. Saracens won the match by a score of 47–10, which was their biggest victory over Harlequins (for both total points scored and overall winning margin) in the Premiership Women's Rugby era. The game recorded an attendance of 3,733 – setting a new club record for a crowd at a women's home fixture.

2 November 2025
15:00

| **Saracens Women** | **47–10** | **Harlequins Women** |
| Try: Corrigan (2) 1' m, 47' c Clifford 7' c Linkins 10' c Royer 34' c McMillan 75' c MacDougall 79' c Con: Harrison (6/7) 8', 11', 35', 48', 76', 80' | Report | Try: Shillaker 18' m Kildunne 72' m |

StoneX Stadium
Attendance: 3,733
Referee: (New Zealand) Richard Gordon (RFU)

Team details

| FB | 15 | (England) Jemma-Jo Linkins | | (substituted off) 69' |
| RW | 14 | (England) Jess Breach |
| OC | 13 | (England) Sydney Gregson |
| IC | 12 | (Scotland) Beth Blacklock | | (substituted off) 63' |
| LW | 11 | (Canada) Alysha Corrigan |
| FH | 10 | (England) Zoe Harrison (cc) |
| SH | 9 | (Canada) Olivia Apps | | (substituted off) 73' |
| N8 | 8 | (England) Poppy Cleall | (yellow card) 28' |
| OF | 7 | (England) Marlie Packer | | (substituted off) 61' |
| BF | 6 | (Canada) Julia Omokhuale | | (substituted off) 69' |
| RL | 5 | (England) Rosie Galligan |
| LL | 4 | (Canada) Laetitia Royer |
| TP | 3 | (Wales) Donna Rose | | (substituted off) 55' |
| HK | 2 | (England) May Campbell (cc) | | (substituted off) 63' |
| LP | 1 | (England) Kelsey Clifford | | (substituted off) 55' |
Substitutions:
| HK | 16 | (England) Bryony Field | | (substituted on) 63' |
| PR | 17 | (England) Akina Gondwe | | (substituted on) 55' |
| PR | 18 | (England) Carmen Tremelling | | (substituted on) 55' |
| LK | 19 | (Scotland) Louise McMillan | | (substituted on) 69' |
| FL | 20 | (Wales) Georgia Evans | | (substituted on) 61' |
| FB | 21 | (England) Sarah McKenna | | (substituted on) 73' |
| FH | 22 | (England) Amelia MacDougall | | (substituted on) 63' |
| WG | 23 | (Canada) Paige Farries | | (substituted on) 69' |
Coach:
(England) Alex Austerberry

| FB | 15 | (England) Ellie Kildunne |
| RW | 14 | (England) Katie Shillaker | (substituted off) 63' |
| OC | 13 | (Spain) Clàudia Peña |
| IC | 12 | (England) Sarah Parry |
| LW | 11 | (England) Beth Wilcock |
| FH | 10 | (England) Lagi Tuima | (substituted off) 49' |
| SH | 9 | (England) Lucy Packer | (substituted off) 63' |
| N8 | 8 | (Scotland) Jade Konkel-Roberts (c) |
| OF | 7 | (Canada) Sara Svoboda |
| BF | 6 | (England) Nicole Wythe |
| RL | 5 | (Wales) Abbie Fleming | (substituted off) 44' |
| LL | 4 | (Scotland) Fiona McIntosh | (substituted off) 63' |
| TP | 3 | (England) Lizzie Hanlon | (substituted off) 51' |
| HK | 2 | (England) Connie Powell | (substituted off) 51' |
| LP | 1 | (Italy) Silvia Turani | (substituted off) 51' |
Substitutions:
| HK | 16 | (Wales) Carys Phillips | (substituted on) 51' |
| PR | 17 | (England) Hannah Sims | (substituted on) 51' |
| PR | 18 | (Spain) Laura Delgado | (substituted on) 51' |
| LK | 19 | (England) Tyla Shirley | (substituted on) 63' |
| FL | 20 | (New Zealand) Liana Mikaele-Tu'u | (substituted on) 44' |
| SH | 21 | (England) Lucy Burgess | (substituted on) 63' |
| FH | 22 | (England) Ella Cromack | (substituted on) 63' |
| FB | 23 | (Wales) Kayleigh Powell | (substituted on) 49' |
Coach:
(England) Ross Chisholm

Player of the Match:
(England) Marlie Packer (Saracens)

Assistant referees:
(England) Ryan Collier (RFU)
(England) Ben Wood (RFU)

==== The Showdown (2026) ====
In March 2026, the Saracens women's team will make their first ever appearance at The Showdown, facing off against Sale Sharks. They will contest the match as the first part of a double-header at the Tottenham Hotspur Stadium, preceding the men's team fixture. In front of a club record crowd of 16,001 – more than four times higher than their previous highest attendance – Saracens secured a dominant victory, with a score of 54–0.

28 March 2026
14:30

| **Saracens Women** | **54–0** | **Sale Sharks Women** |
| Try: Apps 4' c P. Cleall 6' c Senft 9' m Packer 20' c Crake 24' c Clifford 63' c Sharp 65' c Breach 79' c Con: Harrison (7/8) 5', 7', 21', 25', 64', 66', 80' | Report |

Tottenham Hotspur Stadium
Attendance: 16,001
Referee: (England) Nikki O'Donnell (RFU)

Team details

| FB | 15 | (England) Jess Breach |
| RW | 14 | (Canada) Alysha Corrigan |
| OC | 13 | (England) Emma Hardy | (substituted off) 54' |
| IC | 12 | (England) Amelia MacDougall |
| LW | 11 | (England) Sydney Gregson |
| FH | 10 | (England) Zoe Harrison (cc) |
| SH | 9 | (Canada) Olivia Apps | (substituted off) 66' |
| N8 | 8 | (Canada) Gabby Senft |
| OF | 7 | (England) Marlie Packer | (substituted off) 61' |
| BF | 6 | (Canada) Julia Omokhuale | (substituted off) 56' |
| RL | 5 | (Canada) Laetitia Royer |
| LL | 4 | (England) Poppy Cleall | (substituted off) 56' |
| TP | 3 | (England) Carmen Tremelling | (substituted off) 48' |
| HK | 2 | (England) May Campbell (cc) | (substituted off) 54' |
| LP | 1 | (England) Liz Crake | (substituted off) 48' |
Substitutions:
| HK | 16 | (England) Bryony Field | (substituted on) 54' |
| PR | 17 | (England) Kelsey Clifford | (substituted on) 48' |
| PR | 18 | (Wales) Donna Rose | (substituted on) 48' |
| LK | 19 | (Scotland) Louise McMillan | (substituted on) 56' |
| LK | 20 | (Canada) Sophie de Goede | (substituted on) 61' |
| FL | 21 | (Wales) Georgia Evans | (substituted on) 56' |
| SH | 22 | (England) Tori Sellors | (substituted on) 66' |
| WG | 23 | (United States) Lotte Sharp | (substituted on) 54' |
Coach:
(England) Alex Austerberry

| FB | 15 | (England) Lizzie Duffy | | (substituted off) 60' |
| RW | 14 | (Scotland) Rhona Lloyd |
| OC | 13 | (Italy) Beatrice Rigoni | (yellow card) 23' | (substituted off) 34' |
| IC | 12 | (United States) Katana Howard |
| LW | 11 | (Scotland) Shona Campbell |
| FH | 10 | (England) Holly Aitchison |
| SH | 9 | (United States) Olivia Ortiz | | (substituted off) 40' |
| N8 | 8 | (Ireland) Brittany Hogan |
| OF | 7 | (United States) Georgie Perris-Redding (c) |
| BF | 6 | (Scotland) Eva Donaldson |
| RL | 5 | (United States) Erica Jarrell-Searcy | | (substituted off) 40' |
| LL | 4 | (England) Charlotte Fray | | (substituted off) 40' |
| TP | 3 | (England) Evie Roach | | (substituted off) 34' |
| HK | 2 | (Scotland) Molly Wright | | (substituted off) 34' |
| LP | 1 | (England) Detysha Harper | | (substituted off) 34' |
Substitutions:
| HK | 16 | (England) Amy Cokayne | | (substituted on) 34' |
| PR | 17 | (Wales) Gwenllian Pyrs | | (substituted on) 34' |
| PR | 18 | (United States) Nick James | | (substituted on) 34' |
| LK | 19 | (England) Morwenna Talling | | (substituted on) 40' |
| FL | 20 | (Sweden) Katie Childs | | (substituted on) 40' |
| SH | 21 | (England) Amy Relf | | (substituted on) 40' |
| CE | 22 | (Scotland) Evie Wills | | (substituted on) 34' |
| CE | 23 | (Wales) Courtney Keight | | (substituted on) 60' |
Coach:
(England) Tom Hudson

Player of the Match:
(England) Amelia MacDougall (Saracens)

Assistant referees:
(England) Veryan Boscawen (RFU)
(England) Kieron Henry (RFU)

== See also ==
- Saracens
- Saracens Women
- Harlequins
- Harlequins Women
- Wembley Stadium
- London Stadium
- Tottenham Hotspur Stadium
- Barnet Copthall
- London Double Header
- The Big Game
- Slater Cup
- The Clash
