= Croall =

Croall is a surname. Notable people with the surname include:

- Allan Croall (born 1994), Scottish commentator for Football Australia
- Aston Croall (born 1984), English rugby union player
- Heather Croall, Australian-British festival director and documentary producer
- Jason Croall (born 1968), Australian rules footballer
- Jonathan Croall (born 1941), British author and journalist
