= Jordan Turner-Hall =

England international rugby union player (born 1988)

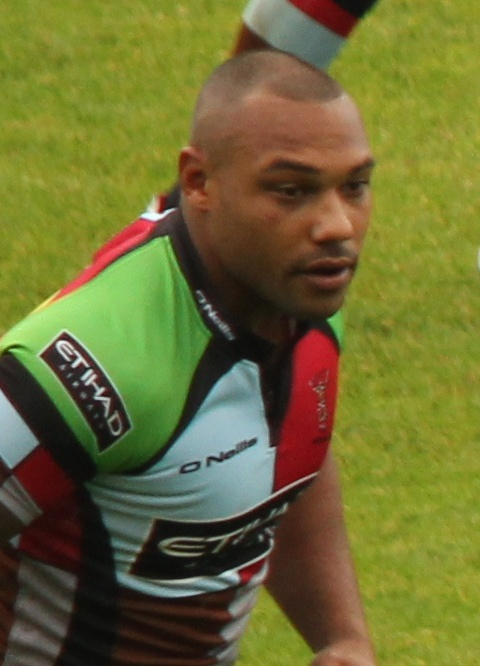
- Born: Jordan Turner-Hall; 5 January 1988 (age 38) London, England
- Height: 1.83 m (6 ft 0 in)
- Weight: 100 kg (15 st 10 lb)
- School: Patcham High School Brighton College

Rugby union career
- Position: Centre
- Current team: Harlequins
Youth career
- Hove RFC
- –: Harlequins Academy
Senior career
Years	Team	Apps	(Points)
2004–2015	Harlequins	172	(80)
International career
Years	Team	Apps	(Points)
2003	England U16	3	(0)
2005	England U18	2	(0)
2006	England U19	4	(5)
2008	England U20	6	(5)
2009–2011	England A	3	(0)
2011–2012	England XV	4	(5)
2012	England	2	(0)
Coaching career
- Years: Team
- 2020–: Harlequins (Academy Coach)

Jordan Turner-Hall (born 5 January 1988 in London, England) is a former rugby union player for Harlequins in the Aviva Premiership, playing primarily as a centre but he could also play on the wing.

His first start for England came on 30 May 2009 against the Barbarians.

He spent his early years playing American football alongside Nick Ashburn and Charlie Canrac, both of whom later played professionally for the Miami Dolphins. Turner-Hall was known as "The Bull" during his football days, asnd his powerful, hefty frame has made him one of the most physical and bruising attacking players in the Premiership. He achieved early honours, including representing Harlequins' first XV at the age of 17 and regularly playing for the England under-20 team.

In 2011, he won the EPCR Challenge Cup, formerly the Amlin Challenge Cup, beating Stade Français 19–18 in the final.

In 2012, he started for Harlequins as they beat Leicester Tigers 30–23 to win the 2011–12 Premiership final.

In 2015, he was forced to retire from playing rugby at just 27 years old after a recurring hip injury. Having been a fan favourite with Harlequins, he had been playing with the senior side since 2004.

In 2020, he rejoined the club as an academy coach. He has since gone on to nurture the likes of Cadan Murley, Louis Lynagh and Oscar Beard who have all come through the Harlequins academy.
