= Ernst Joubert =

South African rugby union player

- Born: 5 August 1980 (age 46) Ceres, Western Cape, South Africa
- Height: 1.93 m (6 ft 4 in)
- Weight: 125 kg (19 st 10 lb)
- Notable relative: Piet Malan (grandfather)

Rugby union career
- Position: Number Eight
- Current team: Saracens
Senior career
Years	Team	Apps	(Points)
2002–2003	Western Province	16	(0)
2003	→ Boland Cavaliers	7	(5)
2005–2009	Golden Lions	39	(10)
2009–2013, 2015	Saracens	161	(100)
- Correct as of 27 November 2015
Super Rugby
Years	Team	Apps	(Points)
2006–2009	Cats / Lions	38	(20)
- Correct as of 21 November 2013

Ernst Joubert (born 5 August 1980) is a South African former rugby union player. He played at Number Eight for Saracens in the Aviva Premiership from 2009 to 2015 and was the vice captain of the team. He retired from all rugby at the end of November 2015.

== Career ==
=== Western Province and Boland Cavaliers ===
Joubert started his career playing for Western Province, being included in the squads for the 2002 Vodacom Cup and Currie Cup competitions. However, he failed to break into the local Super Rugby side, the Stormers and, after seven appearances in the 2003 Vodacom Shield competition, he joined near neighbours Boland Cavaliers for the 2003 Currie Cup qualifying rounds.

=== Golden Lions ===
He moved to Johannesburg to join the Golden Lions prior to the 2004 season. However, several injuries prevented him from making his debut for them until the 2005 Currie Cup competition, starting their match against the Mighty Elephants.

He made his Super Rugby debut for the Cats in 2006 by starting their opening match of the 2006 Super 14 season against the Stormers. He made close to 50 appearances for the franchise (called the Cats in 2006 and the Lions since then) over the next four seasons. He also regularly featured for the Golden Lions domestically in the Currie Cup competition and a few appearances in the 2009 Vodacom Cup competition.

=== Saracens ===
Joubert left South Africa to join English Premiership side Saracens in 2009.

==== 2009–2010 season ====
He made his debut on 5 September 2009 against London Irish in the London Double Header which finished 18–14 to Saracens. He played the whole match but got a yellow card. Joubert turned out to be a mainstay in the Saracens team with 34 appearances and 10 tries. When the usual Saracens captain Steve Borthwick was injured, Joubert took over the captain's duties for the last two months of the season that included the narrow 33–27 defeat to Leicester Tigers in the 2010 Guinness Premiership Final. In this game, Joubert scored both of the Saracens tries to help Saracens narrowly miss out on victory. Joubert was one of the stars of the Saracens team and was rewarded with a place in the 2010 Guinness Premiership Dream Team with the likes of Chris Ashton and Schalk Brits.

==== 2010–2011 season ====
Joubert started the 2010–2011 Aviva Premiership season with being named as the vice captain of the Saracens team. He again started most of the team's games in which was a greatly successful season. Ernst was rewarded for his outstanding performances in the season by being named as the Aviva Premiership Player of the Month for February, also his consistent performances earned him a place in the Sky Sports Aviva Premiership Dream Team 2011. Overall he made 30 appearances and scored three tries in helping the Saracens to win the 2011 Aviva Premiership with a 22-18 win over Leicester Tigers.

==== 2011–2012 season ====
This was Joubert's third season as a Saracens player and he started the season in his usual role as a first team regular. He played 26 games for Saracens in helping them to third place in the league. During the season he scored seven tries for Saracens as they lost in the semi-final to Leicester Tigers.

==== 2012–2013 season ====
Joubert began his fourth season for Saracens in 2012 and made his 100th appearance for the club in the 15-9 defeat to Munster in the Heineken Cup. Joubert also started for Saracens in their first Aviva Premiership match at their new stadium, Allianz Park, in a 31-11 victory over Exeter Chiefs. During the season, Ernst made a total of 26 appearances for the club, scoring one try. Ernst helped Saracens to the semi-finals of the Aviva Premiership, Heineken Cup and LV Cup where the Saracens team lost in all 3 to Northampton Saints, Toulon and Sale Sharks respectively.

==== 2013–2014 season ====
This was Joubert's fifth season playing for Saracens where he continued as the club's vice captain. Despite added competition from the signing of England number 8 Billy Vunipola, Joubert continued to be a regular starter for Saracens, making 21 appearances in the season and scoring 1 try. His appearances have helped his club to the semi-final of the LV Cup where they lost to Northampton Saints and to the finals of the Heineken Cup and the Aviva Premiership playing against Toulon and Northampton Saints respectively. Unfortunately Joubert was injured in the Heineken Cup quarter final against Ulster Rugby which meant that he missed the whole of the end of the season including both finals.

==== 2015–2016 season ====
Joubert retired from all rugby at the end of Saracens' game against Worcester Warriors at Twickenham on 28 November 2015. Following that he immediately moved back to South Africa.
