= Carlos Nieto (rugby union) =

- Born: Carlos Nieto; 25 June 1976 (age 50) La Plata, Argentina
- Height: 1.85 m (6 ft 1 in)
- Weight: 110 kg (17 st 5 lb; 243 lb)

Rugby union career
- Position: Tighthead prop
Senior career
Years	Team	Apps	(Points)
- Viadana
2006–2009	Gloucester Rugby	66	(0)
2009–2013	Saracens	70	(5)
International career
Years	Team	Apps	(Points)
2002-2010	Italy	34	(0)
- Correct as of 26 December 2010

Carlos Nieto (born 25 June 1976) is an Italian Argentine international rugby union player.

Nieto made his Italy debut against England in the 2002 Six Nations but did not manage to establish himself as an automatic choice in the front row.

He was recalled by Berbizier to the national set-up for the 2005 Summer tour of Argentina and Australia. He was one of Italy's best players during the 2006 Six nations championship even though he missed the final game against Scotland because of injury.

In the 2006 he signed for Gloucester Rugby.

In 2009, Nieto signed for Saracens. He started for Saracens as they won their first Premiership title in 2011.

On May 2, 2013, Nieto announced he will retire at the end of the 2012/13 season.
