= Justin Melck =

- Born: Justin Melck; 4 January 1983 (age 43) Cape Town, South Africa
- Height: 1.88 m (6 ft 2 in)
- Weight: 106 kg (16 st 10 lb)
- School: Rondebosch Boys High School; Fettes College
- Occupation: Professional rugby union footballer

Rugby union career
- Position: Flanker
Senior career
Years	Team	Apps	(Points)
2008	Munster	8	(10)
2009–14	Saracens	74	(35)
- Correct as of 11 May 2014
Provincial / State sides
Years	Team	Apps	(Points)
2005–08	Western Province	37	(5)
Super Rugby
Years	Team	Apps	(Points)
2006–07	Stormers	13	(5)
International career
Years	Team	Apps	(Points)
2014–	Germany	1	(5)
- Correct as of 26 April 2014

Justin Melck (born 4 January 1983) is a South African born German rugby union player. He plays as a Flanker.

== Early life ==
Melck was born in Cape Town and educated at Rondebosch Boys High School, Fettes College in Scotland and Stellenbosch University,

== Career in South Africa ==
Melck has played for Western Province and the Super Rugby side Stormers.

Melck captained the Western Province side during the Currie Cup tournament in July 2007.

== Munster ==
He has signed a three-month loan deal with European Champions Munster.

== Saracens ==
Melck joined Saracens March 2009 and left at the end of the 2013-14 season.

== Personal life ==
He got married on 6 February 2010 to Georgina Simpson.

== Germany ==
Melck was eligible to play for Germany because of his German mother, was called up for their match against Sweden on 26 April 2014 where he represents the country for the first time.
