= Mark Lambert (rugby union) =

English rugby union player

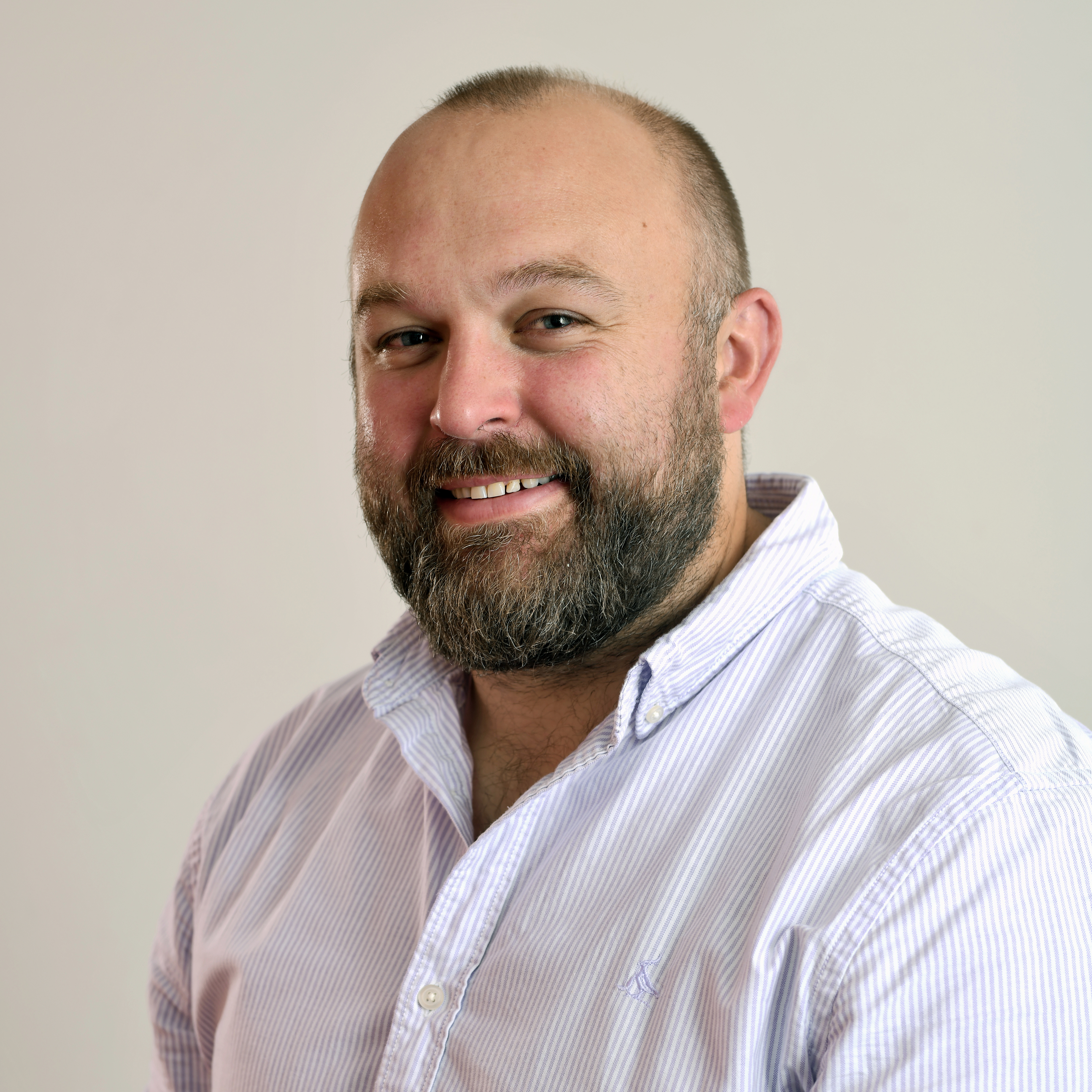
- Born: 19 February 1985 (age 41) London, England, UK
- Height: 1.91 m (6 ft 3 in)
- Weight: 131 kg (20 st 9 lb)
- School: RGS Guildford

Rugby union career
- Position: Loosehead Prop
Senior career
Years	Team	Apps	(Points)
2004–2020	Harlequins	250	(20)
International career
Years	Team	Apps	(Points)
2009–2020	England Saxons		

Mark Lambert (born 19 February 1985 in London) is a former rugby union player for Harlequins in the Gallagher Premiership. He played as a prop.

Lambert represented England at U19 and U21 level. He made his debut for the England Saxons against the Argentina Jaguars at the 2009 Churchill Cup.

He was a replacement for Harlequins in their 2011–12 Premiership final victory over Leicester Tigers.

In November 2017, he was elected as the chairman of the Rugby Players' Association

He holds the rather inauspicious record of being the player most used as a substitute in Gallagher Premiership history.

He announced his retirement in June 2020.

Following his retirement from the sport, he joined the Rugby Players Association full-time, joining as their Head of Rugby Policy.
