= Jason Croall =

Australian rules footballer

Personal information
- Full name: Jason Scott Croall
- Born: 16 January 1968 (age 58)
- Original team: Bundoora Juniors
- Debut: 4 April 1987, Collingwood vs. Carlton, at Waverley Park
- Height: 188 cm (6 ft 2 in)
- Weight: 82 kg (181 lb)
- Position: Defender

Playing career^{1}
Years	Club	Games (Goals)
1987–1992	Collingwood	37 (4)
1993	Sandringham (VFA)	1 (0)
- ^{1} Playing statistics correct to the end of 1992.

Career highlights
- Collingwood under-19 premiership captain 1986; Joseph Wren Memorial Trophy 1992; Sandringham reserves premiership player 1993

Jason Scott Croall (born 16 January 1968) is a former Australian rules footballer who played with Collingwood in the Victorian/Australian Football League (VFL/AFL).

Croall played for Bundoora's junior team before joining Collingwood.

Before becoming a senior, Croall captained the under-19 premiership team who won the grand final against North Melbourne in 1986.

Croall played most of his senior games in his first two seasons (28 games), but contributed afterwards at the reserves level and was awarded the Joseph Wren Memorial Trophy in his final season with Collingwood.

After leaving Collingwood, Croall played for a year with Sandringham in the Victorian Football Association (VFA). He played only one senior game, but was in the 1993 reserves premiership team.

Later in his career, Croall joined Northcote Park in the Northern Football League (NFL) winning a premiership with them in 1999.

Since retiring from football, Croall works as an accountant.
