= Richard Skuse =

English rugby union player

Richard David Skuse
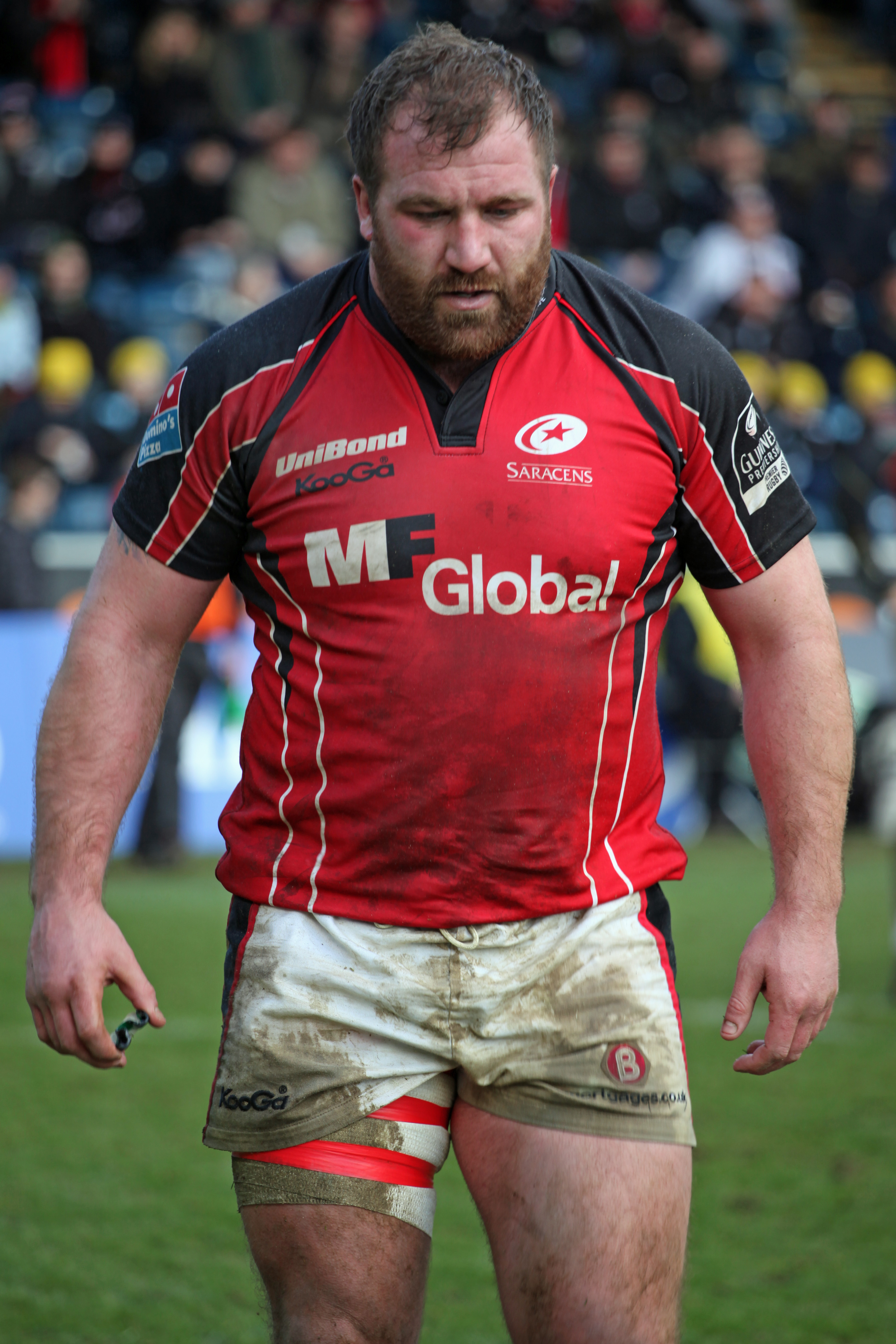
- Born: Richard David Skuse; 11 September 1980 (age 46) Bristol, England
- Height: 1.80 m (5 ft 11 in)
- Weight: 118 kg (18 st 8 lb)

Rugby union career
- Position: Prop
Senior career
Years	Team	Apps	(Points)
2002–2003	Bristol Bears		(0)
2005–2009	London Irish		(5)
2009–2010	Saracens		(0)

Richard David Skuse (born 11 September 1980) is a retired Rugby union prop who last played for the Saracens during the 2009–10 season.

Skuse was born in Bristol and started his professional career playing for the Bristol Shoguns in the 2002–03 season. He joined the London Irish after a brief hiatus, playing with the team for 4 years from 2005 to 2009. He joined Saracens for the 2009–10 season. After suffering a neck injury while playing for Saracens, Skuse was forced into retirement before playing a second season.
