= John Kingston (rugby union) =

- Born: Christopher John Kingston; 4 March 1960 (age 66)
- School: Durham School
- University: Magdalene College, Cambridge

Rugby union career
Coaching career
- Years: Team
- 1992–1999: Richmond
- 1999-2001: Galwegians
- 2001–2018: Harlequins

Christopher John Kingston (born 4 March 1960) is an English rugby union coach and former player. He was part of the Harlequins coaching staff from 2001 until 2018, holding multiple positions including Head Coach and Director of Rugby.

As a player, Kingston played for England Schools, winning caps on the all conquering 1979 tour to Australia and New Zealand. He then won a place at Cambridge University, appearing in three successive winning Varsity matches between 1980 and 1982 - Captaining them in 1982. Kingston also played for Durham City, Newcastle Gosforth, Rosslyn Park, Harlequins, Middlesex and London Division. He subsequently won England U23s and England B Caps before being forced to retire with a knee injury.

Kingston spent 7 years with Richmond, initially as a coach while the game was still amateur. He coached Richmond Under 21s to an unbeaten season in 1992/3 and then took charge of the first team. In 1995 the game turned professional and Kingston was appointed full time Director of Rugby in 1996 Under Kingston, the club earned promotion from Division 3 to the Premiership, finishing fifth in their first season in the Premiership in 1997-98 and reaching the Tetley Bitter Cup semi finals in 1998/9. Kingston left Richmond in 1999 and moved to Ireland to become coach at AIB League side Galwegians. During his 2 year tenure, the team were promoted to the first division, and then finished 2nd in the top flight making the end of season play-offs for the first time in their history.

Kingston joined Harlequins in 2001, was appointed Head Coach in 2008 and Director of Rugby in 2016. In his time as Head Coach, Harlequins were crowned English Premiership Champions in 2012. He also oversaw the winning of 2 European Challenge Cups in 2004 and 2011. The LV Cup was also won in 2013. As Director of Rugby, Harlequins finished 6th in his first season, qualifying for the Heineken Cup. In April 2018, it was announced that it had been agreed that Kingston would leave the club by mutual consent at the end of the season. Kingston also acted as Forwards Consultant to the England Rugby National side between 2013 and 2015.

Before turning professional in rugby, Kingston was a Director in a London West End Commercial Property Practice. He is now a Partner in Taylor Woodcock Kingston (TWK Ltd) where he advises Sports players on life needs and also owns CJK Sports Consultancy Ltd.
