= Aston Croall =

- Born: Aston Lee Croall; 10 July 1984 (age 42) Isle of Sheppey, Northern Kent, England
- Height: 1.83 m (6 ft 0 in)
- Weight: 118 kg (18 st 8 lb)
- School: Minster College, Kent

Rugby union career
- Position: Loosehead prop/Hooker
- Current team: Sheppey RUFC
Youth career
- Old Albanians
- –: Sheppey
Senior career
| Years | Team | Apps | (Points) |
| 2002–2005 | Saracens | | |
| 2005–2010 | Harlequins | 22 | (10) |
| 2010–2011 | Sale Sharks | 23 | (5) |
| 2011– | Harlequins | 0 | (0) |

Aston Croall (born 10 July 1984) is a retired English rugby union player who spent the majority of his career with Harlequins plying loosehead prop or hooker. Croall played age-group rugby of England at U16, U18, U19, U21 and England Counties XV. He was part of the England Under 21 squad that competed in the 2005 Under 21 Rugby World Championship.

In 2010 Croall made the switch to join Sale Sharks where he played for one season before on 10 November 2011 it was announced he was returning to Harlequins for the remainder of the 2011/12 season as an injury replacement. Croall went on to play in a number of games that season for Harlequins including a Heineken Cup match away in Toulon in which he started in the front row as Hooker. At the end of the season Aston headed back to Manchester to see out his third year of his contract. Croall subsequently signed an extension on his contract for one more season keeping him at Sale Sharks until 2014.

During the summer of 2014 Aston signed a contract with National League 1 side Blackheath F.C., where he featured in all but 1 game due to injury. It was during this season that Aston was chosen to play for England Counties XV and Barbarian FC. Croall finished his playing career at Tunbridge Wells RFC after spending one year with them as player coach. In 2017 Croall was appointed general manager of Sheppey RFC.
