= Oscar Beard =

English rugby union player

- Full name: Oscar Charles Marston Beard
- Born: 20 November 2001 (age 25) Frimley Park, England
- Height: 1.86 m (6 ft 1 in)
- Weight: 101 kg (223 lb; 15 st 13 lb)
- School: Lord Wandsworth College; Cranleigh School

Rugby union career
- Position(s): Centre, Wing
- Current team: Harlequins
Senior career
Years	Team	Apps	(Points)
2021–	Harlequins	91	(45)
- Correct as of 18 January 2025
International career
Years	Team	Apps	(Points)
2019	England U18	3	(0)
2024–	England A	2	(5)
2025–	England	1	(0)
- Correct as of 19 July 2025

Oscar Charles Beard (born 20 November 2001) is an English professional rugby union player who plays as a centre for Premiership Rugby club Harlequins and the England national team.

== Early life ==
Beard was born at Frimley Park Hospital in Frimley, Surrey, the same hospital as Jonny Wilkinson. Like Wilkinson, he started his rugby career at Alton Rugby Club playing tag rugby, then joining Farnham RUFC in the under-9’s. Beard was selected for the Harlequins academy at 12 years-old. He attended Lord Wandsworth College until the age of 14, then moved to Cranleigh School where he was 1st XV captain during the 2018/19 unbeaten season, which saw Cranleigh School lift the Daily Mail Trophy. He was also part of the unbeaten team in 2016/17 and the Rosslyn Park Rugby Sevens cup runners-up the same year.

== Club career ==
In April 2021, Beard made his senior debut for Harlequins against Sale Sharks. In January 2022, following fourteen appearances during the 2021-22 season, Beard signed a new long-term contract with Harlequins. His appearances included two tries against London Irish in the Premiership in November 2021 and a European Champions Cup debut against Castres in December 2021.

During 2022, Beard played one game on loan at London Scottish.

In April 2024, Beard was part of the side that defeated Glasgow Warriors 28-24 at home in the Round of 16, the first time the club had ever won a knockout game in the Champions Cup. The following week, he made his 50th appearance for the club, beating Bordeaux Bègles 42-41 away in only the second knockout victory for in the competitions history for the club. He also played in their semi-final elimination against Toulouse.

== International career ==
Beard has been a part of the England pathway since under-15’s and played for England South, England U17’s, England U18 and earning 2 caps on their tour to South Africa in 2019 and England U20 in 2021. Following highly acclaimed performances in the No 12 shirt for England U20, Beard earned his Premiership debut for Harlequins v Sale which resulted in an injury ruling him out of the Six Nations Under 20s Championship just days before the tournament commenced.

In January 2024, Beard was called up by coach Steve Borthwick to the senior England squad for the 2024 Six Nations Championship. He played at outside centre and scored a try on his England A debut against Portugal on 25 February 2024. In October 2024, he was selected in Steve Borthwick’s 36 man senior training squad in preparation for the 2024 Autumn Series. A concussion in the European Champions Cup match against Munster in November 2024 ruled him out following rehabilitation with England team training in Girona. Following this set back, Beard was called-up to the England A side going on to beat Australia A 38-17 at The Stoop.

Beard was called up to the senior training squad for the 2025 Six Nations. Later that year he was included in the squad for their 2025 summer tour. On 21 June 2025 he came off the bench for the England XV v France XV at Allianz Stadium, Twickenham. On 19 July 2025, he made his senior England debut, off the bench, winning 40-5 against USA at Audi Field in Washington, D.C.
