= Schalk Brits =

South African rugby union player

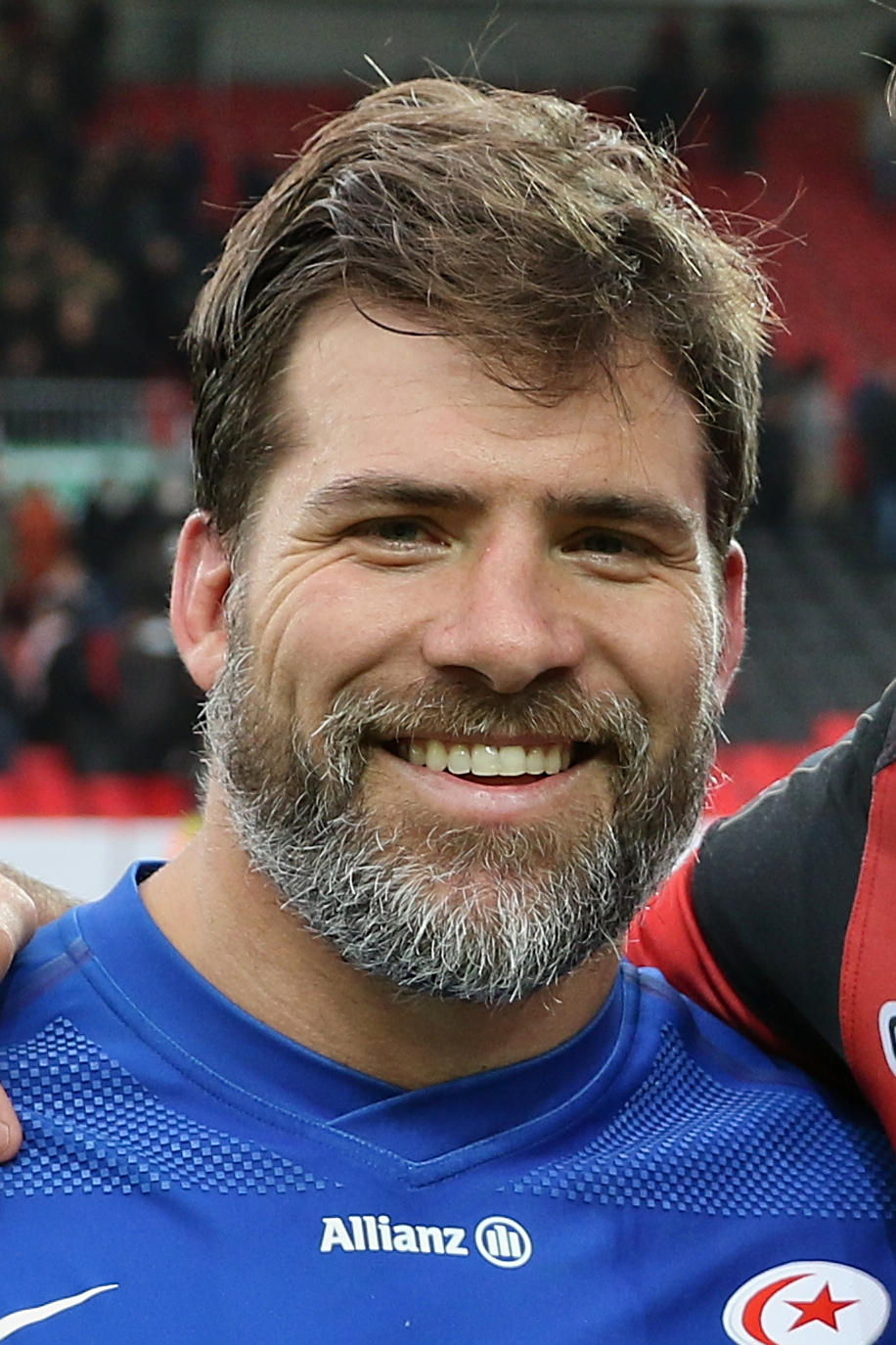
- Full name: Schalk Burger Brits
- Born: 16 May 1981 (age 45) Empangeni, South Africa
- Height: 1.82 m (5 ft 11 1/2 in)
- Weight: 100 kg (220 lb; 15 st 10 lb)
- School: Paul Roos Gymnasium
- University: Stellenbosch University

Rugby union career
- Position: Hooker
Senior career
Years	Team	Apps	(Points)
2002–2003	Western Province	12	(20)
2004–2005	Golden Lions	35	(55)
2005	Cats	11	(0)
2006–2009	Stormers	51	(20)
2006–2009	Western Province	28	(10)
2009–2018	Saracens	216	(185)
2011	→ Stormers	1	(0)
2019	Bulls	11	(0)
- Correct as of 11 July 2019
International career
Years	Team	Apps	(Points)
2008–2019	South Africa	15	(15)
- Correct as of 21 October 2019
Medal record
Men's Rugby union
Representing South Africa
Rugby World Cup
Bronze medal – third place	2015 England	Squad
Gold medal – first place	2019 Japan	Squad

Schalk Burger Brits (born 16 May 1981) is a South African former professional rugby union player who last played for the South Africa national team and the Bulls in Super Rugby. He primarily played as a hooker. He was part of the 2019 Rugby World Cup-winning team, and is the oldest player to win a Rugby World Cup, aged 38 years, 170 days.

== Personal life ==
Brits was born in Empangeni, KwaZulu-Natal and attended Paul Roos Gymnasium before going to Stellenbosch University. He married Colinda Wijnants on 29 January 2011 in Greyton, South Africa.

== Club career ==
=== Western Province ===
Brits played for the Western Province from 2002 to 2004 and rejoined the Cape franchise from 2006 to 2009.

=== Stormers ===
Brits played for the Stormers for four seasons making 51 appearances for them and managing to score 20 points.

=== Saracens ===
Brits made his debut for Saracens in the season opener against London Irish. He scored his first try for Saracens on 27 September 2009 against Gloucester in a 19–16 win. He scored seven tries in the 2009–10 season and played every minute in the Premiership Final against Leicester Tigers, which Saracens lost 33–27.

Brits was voted Players' Player of the year for the 2009–10 season.

In the 2010–11 grand final against Leicester, Brits won the Man of the Match award in a match that Saracens won 22–18.

On 27 June 2011, Brits moved back to his former club Stormers on a short-term loan deal. He played as a back rower for the South African side in the Super Rugby semifinal loss against the Crusaders as a replacement for Duane Vermeulen.

In January 2012, he signed a new deal with the Saracens that kept him at the club for another three seasons. This was later extended, and he remained at Saracens until the end of the 2017–18 season. During his time at Saracens he has won four Premiership titles in 2011, 2015, 2016 and 2018, with Brits featuring in all four finals. He also helped Saracens win the European Champions Cup in 2016 and 2017.

== International career ==
Brits made his international debut against Italy in 2008. He was next called up when he was included in the Springbok squad that toured Ireland, Scotland and England during the 2012 end-of-year rugby union internationals. He came on as a substitute in the match against Scotland to earn his fourth cap. He earned his fifth cap in their next match, replacing Adriaan Strauss as they beat England 16–15.

Brits returned to international rugby in 2015, coming on as a substitute in South Africa's 2015 Rugby World Cup warm-up match against Argentina, and was then included in South Africa's squad that participated at the 2015 Rugby World Cup. While he didn't feature in their 32–34 loss to Japan in their opening match, he did play off the bench in their next match against Samoa, scoring a late try in a 34–16 victory. He was again omitted against Scotland before another appearance from the bench in a 64–0 victory over the United States. He didn't feature in their 23–19 win over Wales in the quarter final, their 18–20 loss to New Zealand in the semi-finals or the third-place play-off against Argentina, which South Africa won 24–13 to secure the bronze medal in the competition.

In 2019, Brits was selected to play for South Africa at the 2019 Rugby World Cup, aged 38. He was named captain in their match against Namibia, playing out of position as an eighth man, and also scored a try in the match. South Africa went on to win the tournament, defeating England in the final.

== Honours ==
- Rugby World Cup
  - Winner: 2019
