= List of Saracens F.C. records and statistics =

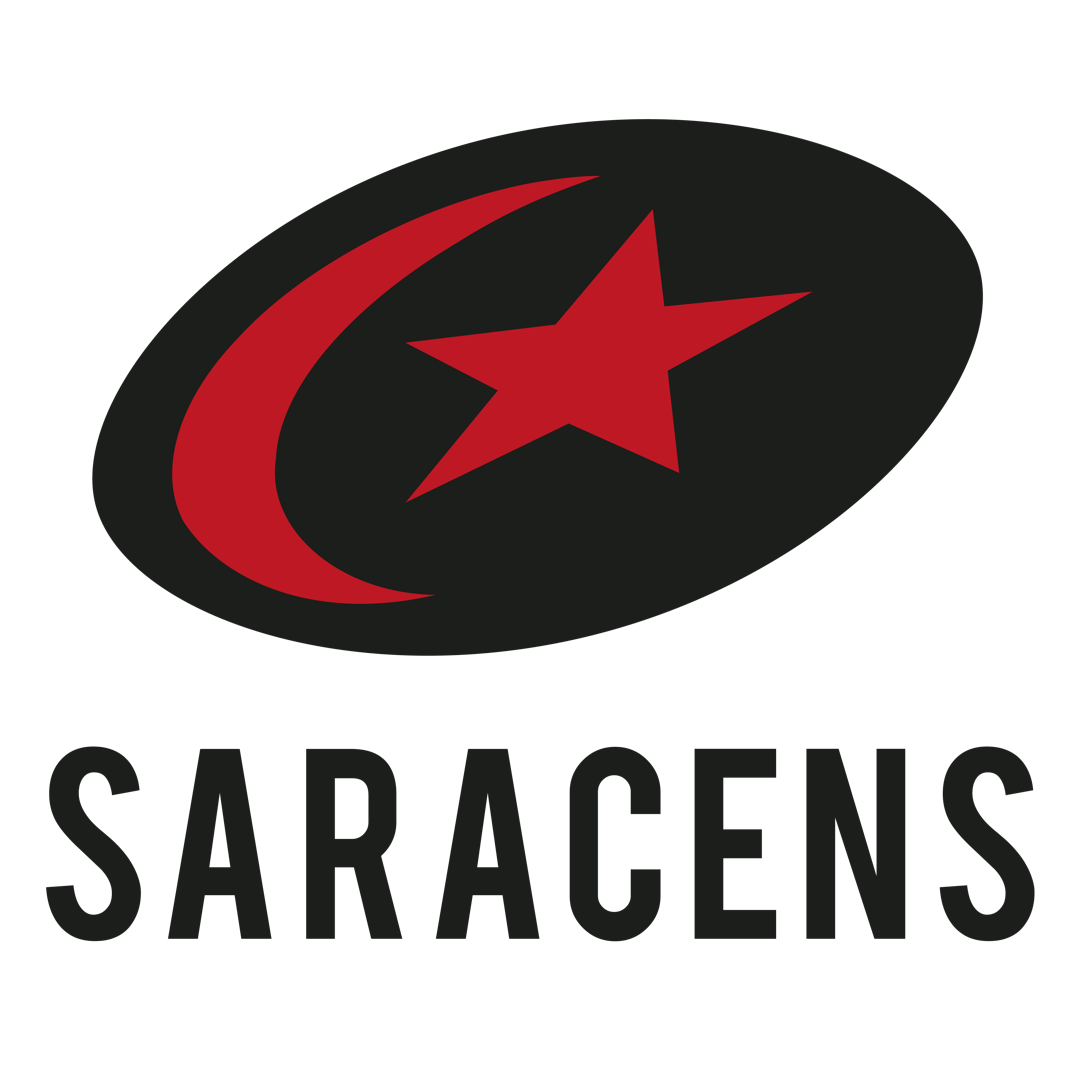
Saracens logo

This article collates key individual and team honours, awards, records and statistics relating to Saracens – the professional English rugby union club based in North London, currently competing in Premiership Rugby and European Professional Club Rugby.

== Club honours ==
=== Saracens F.C. ===
- Premiership Rugby
  - Champions: (6) 2010–11, 2014–15, 2015–16, 2017–18, 2018–19, 2022–23
  - Runners–up: (4) 1997–98, 2009–10, 2013–14, 2021–22
- RFU Championship
  - Champions: (3) 1988–89, 1994–95, 2020–21
- European Rugby Champions Cup
  - Champions: (3) 2015–16, 2016–17, 2018–19
  - Runners–up: (1) 2013–14
- RFU Knockout Cup
  - Champions: (1) 1997–98
- Anglo–Welsh Cup
  - Champions: (1) 2014–15
- Premiership Rugby Cup
  - Runners–up: (1) 2018–19
- Middlesex Senior Cup
  - Champions: (4) 1971–72, 1975–76, 1979–80, 1985–86
  - Runners–up: (3) 1974–75, 1977–78, 1980–81

=== Saracens Storm Reserves ===
- Premiership Rugby Shield
  - Champions: (2) 2014–15, 2018–19
  - Runners-up: (1) 2012–13

=== Saracens Sevens ===
- Premiership Rugby Sevens Series
  - Champions: (3) 2010, 2018, 2019
  - Runners–up: (1) 2011
- Melrose Sevens
  - Champions: (2) 2012, 2013
- London City Sevens
  - Runners–up: (1) 2025

== Personnel honours and records ==
=== Most appearances ===
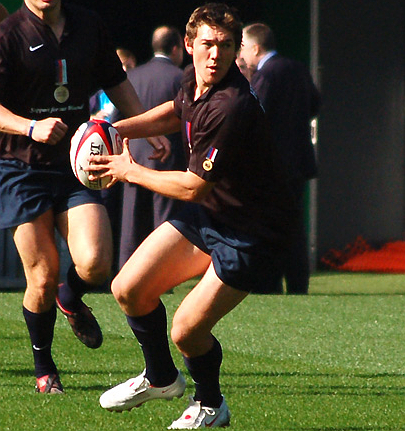
Saracens record appearance holder Alex Goode

The following players have recorded the most appearances for Saracens across all competitions:

1. (England) Alex Goode (402), 2008–2025
2. (England) Kris Chesney (338), 1995–2009
3. (England) John Buckton (319), 1984–1996
4. (England) Jamie George (311), 2009–present
5. (England) Jackson Wray (309), 2008–2023
6. (England) Kevin Sorrell (304), 1995–2010
7. (England) Richard Hill (275), 1993–2008
8. (England) Brad Barritt (262), 2008–2020
9. (South Africa) Neil de Kock (257), 2006–2017
10. (England) Owen Farrell (256), 2008–2024, 2025–present

=== Hall of Fame ===
The following players have been inducted into the Saracens Hall of Fame:

- (England) John Steeds (1938–1950)
- (England) Tony Turner (1946–1949)
- (England) Vic Harding (1951–1964)
- (England) Ken Bartlett (1959–1962, 1967)
- (England) James Wyness (1961–1968)
- (England) George Sherriff (1963–1973)
- (England) John Lockwood (1963–1977)
- (England) Mel Williams (1966–1976)
- (England) Floyd Steadman (1980–1990)
- (England) Lee Adamson (1983–1994, 2000–2007)
- (England) Brian Davies (1990–1996)
- (England) John Buckton (1984–1996)
- (Australia) Michael Lynagh (1996–1998)
- (France) Philippe Sella (1996–1998)

=== Most titles ===
The following players have won the most Premiership and European titles with Saracens:

| Player | Premierships won | Title-winning seasons | Champions Cups won | Title-winning seasons | Total titles won |
|---|---|---|---|---|---|
| (England) Owen Farrell | 6 | 2011, 2015, 2016, 2018, 2019, 2023 | 3 | 2016, 2017, 2019 | 9 |
| (England) Jamie George | 6 | 2011, 2015, 2016, 2018, 2019, 2023 | 3 | 2016, 2017, 2019 | 9 |
| (England) Alex Goode | 6 | 2011, 2015, 2016, 2018, 2019, 2023 | 3 | 2016, 2017, 2019 | 9 |
| (England) Jackson Wray | 6 | 2011, 2015, 2016, 2018, 2019, 2023 | 3 | 2016, 2017, 2019 | 9 |
| (England) Brad Barritt | 5 | 2011, 2015, 2016, 2018, 2019 | 3 | 2016, 2017, 2019 | 8 |
| (England) George Kruis | 5 | 2011, 2015, 2016, 2018, 2019 | 3 | 2016, 2017, 2019 | 8 |
| (England) Richard Wigglesworth | 5 | 2011, 2015, 2016, 2018, 2019 | 3 | 2016, 2017, 2019 | 8 |
| (England) Maro Itoje | 5 | 2015, 2016, 2018, 2019, 2023 | 3 | 2016, 2017, 2019 | 8 |
| (Scotland) Duncan Taylor | 5 | 2015, 2016, 2018, 2019, 2023 | 3 | 2016, 2017, 2019 | 8 |
| (England) Billy Vunipola | 5 | 2015, 2016, 2018, 2019, 2023 | 3 | 2016, 2017, 2019 | 8 |
| (England) Mako Vunipola | 5 | 2015, 2016, 2018, 2019, 2023 | 3 | 2016, 2017, 2019 | 8 |
| (England) Richard Barrington | 4 | 2015, 2016, 2018, 2019 | 3 | 2016, 2017, 2019 | 7 |
| (Argentina) Marcelo Bosch | 4 | 2015, 2016, 2018, 2019 | 3 | 2016, 2017, 2019 | 7 |
| (Argentina) Juan Figallo | 4 | 2015, 2016, 2018, 2019 | 3 | 2016, 2017, 2019 | 7 |
| (England) Ben Spencer | 4 | 2015, 2016, 2018, 2019 | 3 | 2016, 2017, 2019 | 7 |
| (South Africa) Schalk Brits | 4 | 2011, 2015, 2016, 2018 | 2 | 2016, 2017 | 6 |
| (United States) Chris Wyles | 4 | 2011, 2015, 2016, 2018 | 2 | 2016, 2017 | 6 |
| (South Africa) Michael Rhodes | 3 | 2016, 2018, 2019 | 3 | 2016, 2017, 2019 | 6 |
| (Scotland) Kelly Brown | 3 | 2011, 2015, 2016 | 2 | 2016, 2017 | 5 |
| (South Africa) Petrus du Plessis | 3 | 2011, 2015, 2016 | 2 | 2016, 2017 | 5 |
| (England) Alex Lozowski | 3 | 2018, 2019, 2023 | 2 | 2017, 2019 | 5 |
| (Scotland) Sean Maitland | 3 | 2018, 2019, 2023 | 2 | 2017, 2019 | 5 |
| (Wales) Nick Tompkins | 3 | 2018, 2019, 2023 | 2 | 2017, 2019 | 5 |

== World Rugby honours ==
The following Saracens players have achieved recognition at the World Rugby Awards (presented annually since 2001):

Key
| Player (X) | Name of the player and number of times that they had been nominated for the award at that point (if more than one) |

Men's 15s World Player of the Year
| Year | Nominated | Winner | Ref |
|---|---|---|---|
| 2012 | (England) Owen Farrell | — | |
| 2016 | (England) Owen Farrell (2), (England) Maro Itoje, (England) Billy Vunipola | — | |
| 2017 | (England) Owen Farrell (3), (England) Maro Itoje (2) | — | |
| 2021 | (England) Maro Itoje (3) | — | |

Men's 15s Dream Team of the Year
| Year | Player | Position | Ref |
|---|---|---|---|
| 2021 | (England) Maro Itoje | No. 4 (Lock) | |
| 2025 | (England) Maro Itoje (2) | No. 4 (Lock) | |

Men's 15s Breakthrough Player of the Year
| Year | Nominated | Winner | Ref |
|---|---|---|---|
| 2016 | (England) Maro Itoje | (England) Maro Itoje | |

Men's 15s Junior Player of the Year
| Year | Nominated | Winner | Ref |
|---|---|---|---|
| 2014 | (England) Nathan Earle | — | |

=== Halls of fame ===
Several former Saracens players have been inducted into the two incarnations of the World Rugby Hall of Fame:

World Rugby Hall of Fame
| Year | Inductee | Position | Notes |
|---|---|---|---|
| 2008 | (France) Philippe Sella | Centre | Saracens player 1996–1998 |
| 2011 | (South Africa) Francois Pienaar | Flanker | Saracens player/coach 1997–2002 |
| 2011 | (South Africa) John Smit | Hooker | Saracens player 2011–2013 |
| 2014 | (England) Jason Leonard | Prop | Saracens player 1989–1990 |
| 2014 | (Australia) Michael Lynagh | Fly-half | Saracens player 1996–1998 |
| 2015 | (Australia) Tim Horan | Centre | Saracens player 2000–2003 |
| 2025 | (England) Richard Hill | Flanker | Saracens player 1993–2008 |

IRB Hall of Fame
| Year | Inductee | Position |
|---|---|---|
| 1999 | (France) Philippe Sella | Centre |
| 2001 | (Australia) Michael Lynagh | Fly-half |
| 2003 | (Australia) Tim Horan | Centre |
| 2005 | (South Africa) Francois Pienaar | Flanker |
| 2007 | (England) Jason Leonard | Prop |

== Six Nations Championship honours ==
The following players have been named on either the Six Nations Player of the Championship or Team of the Championship shortlist while at Saracens:

Six Nations Player of the Championship
| Year | Positions | Nominated | Winner |
|---|---|---|---|
| 2006 | Fly-half | (France) Thomas Castaignède | — |
| 2013 | Fly-half | (England) Owen Farrell | — |
| 2014 | Fly-half | (England) Owen Farrell (2) | — |
| 2015 | Number 8 | (England) Billy Vunipola | — |
| 2016 | Centre | (Scotland) Duncan Taylor | — |
| 2016 | Number 8 | (England) Billy Vunipola (2) | — |
| 2017 | Fly-half | (England) Owen Farrell (3) | — |
| 2017 | Lock | (England) Maro Itoje | — |
| 2019 | Full-back | (Wales) Liam Williams | — |
| 2020 | Lock | (England) Maro Itoje (2) | — |
| 2024 | Number 8 | (England) Ben Earl | — |

Six Nations Team of the Championship
| Year | No. | Player | Position | Ref |
|---|---|---|---|---|
| 2022 | 4. | (England) Maro Itoje | Lock | |
| 2024 | 8. | (England) Ben Earl | Number 8 | |
| 2025 | 4. | (England) Maro Itoje (2) | Lock | |
| 2026 | 1. | (Wales) Rhys Carré | Prop | |

== European Rugby honours and records ==
=== European Player of the Year ===
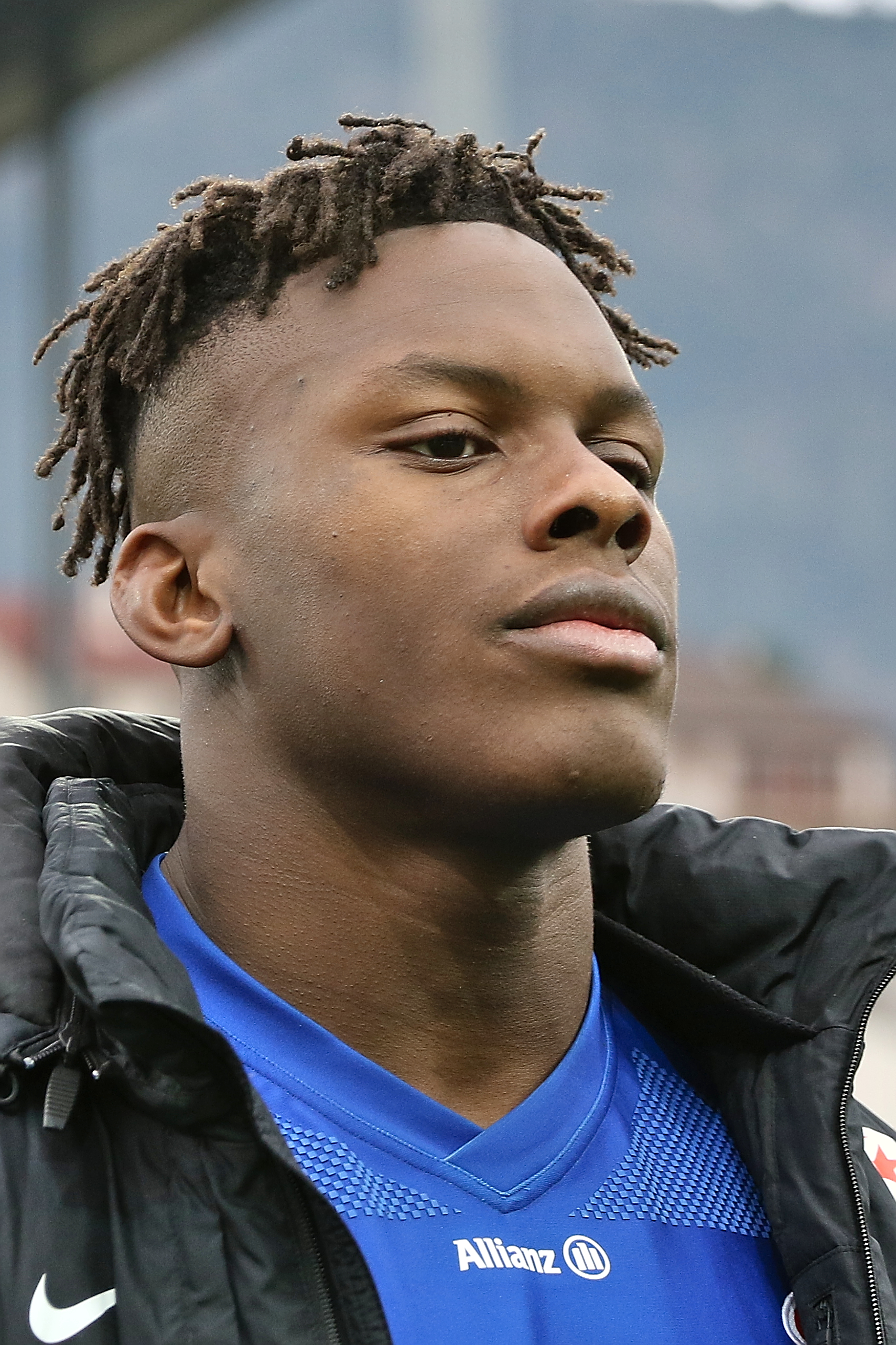
2016 EPCR Player of the Year Maro Itoje

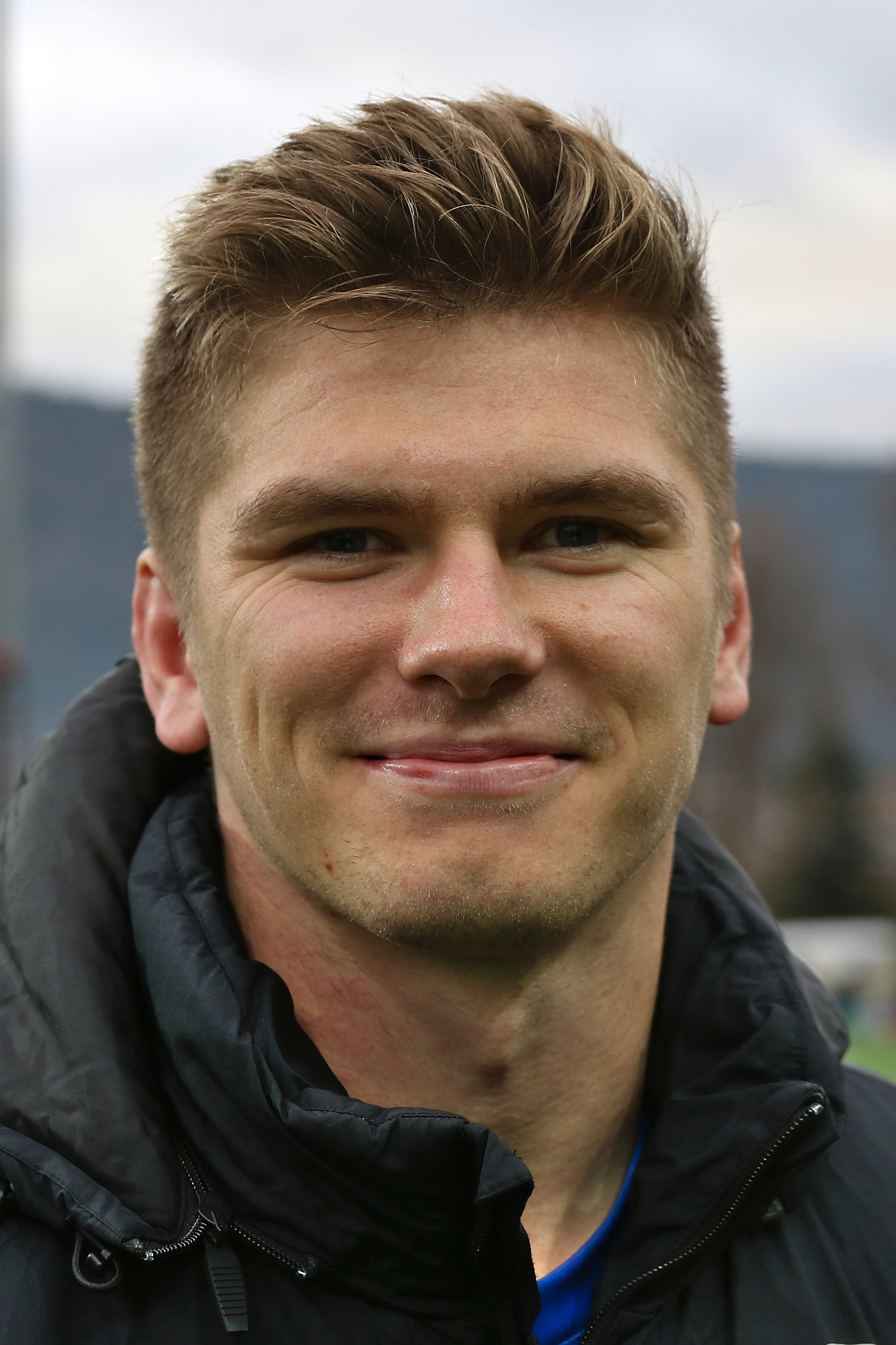
2017 EPCR Player of the Year Owen Farrell

The following Saracens players have been named as the nominees and winners of the EPCR European Player of the Year award (presented annually since 2011):

Key
| Player (X) | Name of the player and number of times that they had been nominated for the award at that point (if more than one) |
| § | Denotes that the club was also the winner of the European Rugby Champions Cup during the same season |
| ‡ | Denotes that the club was also the runner-up of the European Rugby Champions Cup during the same season |

| Season | Nominated | Winner | Ref |
|---|---|---|---|
| 2010–11 | — | — | |
| 2011–12 | (England) Mouritz Botha, (England) Owen Farrell | — | |
| 2012–13 | (England) Owen Farrell (2), (England) Charlie Hodgson | — | |
| 2013–14‡ | (England) Chris Ashton, (South Africa) Schalk Brits, (Namibia) Jacques Burger, (England) Alex Goode | — | |
| 2014–15 | (England) Chris Ashton (2), (England) Billy Vunipola | — | |
| 2015–16^{§} | (England) Owen Farrell (3), (England) Maro Itoje, (England) George Kruis, (England) Billy Vunipola (2) | (England) Maro Itoje | |
| 2016–17^{§} | (England) Owen Farrell (4), (England) Maro Itoje (2) | (England) Owen Farrell | |
| 2017–18 | (England) Owen Farrell (5) | — | |
| 2018–19^{§} | (England) Alex Goode (2), (England) Mako Vunipola | (England) Alex Goode | |
| 2019–22 | — | — | |
| 2022–23 | (England) Elliot Daly | — | |
| 2023–26 | — | — | |

European Golden Boot
| Season | Position | Player | Points | Games | PPG |
|---|---|---|---|---|---|
| 2007–08 | Fly-half | (New Zealand) Glen Jackson | 123 | 8 | 8.75 |
| 2015–16^{§} | Fly-half | (England) Owen Farrell | 127 | 9 | 14.11 |
| 2016–17^{§} | Fly-half | (England) Owen Farrell (2) | 126 | 9 | 14.00 |
| 2017–18 | Fly-half | (England) Owen Farrell (3) | 92 | 7 | 13.14 |
| 2018–19^{§} | Fly-half | (England) Owen Farrell (4) | 89 | 7 | 12.71 |

European Top Try Scorer
| Season | Position | Player | Tries | Games | TPG |
|---|---|---|---|---|---|
| 2007–08 | Wing | (England) Richard Haughton | 5 | 8 | 0.63 |
| 2007–08 | Wing | (Fiji) Kameli Ratuvou | 5 | 8 | 0.63 |
| 2013–14‡ | Wing | (England) Chris Ashton | 11 | 9 | 1.22 |

=== Highest scorers by European season ===
The following lists include the top try scorers and top points scorers for Saracens during each European season from 1999–2000 onwards:

Most tmories
| Season | Position | Player | Tries |
|---|---|---|---|
| 1999–00 | Flanker | (England) Richard Hill | 3 |
| 1999–00 | Centre | (England) Mark Mapletoft | 3 |
| 1999–00 | Flanker | (South Africa) Francois Pienaar | 3 |
| 2000–01 | Flanker | (England) Richard Hill (2) | 3 |
| 2000–01 | Wing | (England) Dan Luger | 3 |
| 2000–01 | Centre | (England) Kevin Sorrell | 3 |
| 2001–05 | Top scorers to be confirmed | | |
| 2005–06 | Prop | (England) Kevin Yates | 3 |
| 2006–07 | Centre | (Argentina) Tomás de Vedia | 4 |
| 2007–08 | Wing | (England) Richard Haughton | 5 |
| 2007–08 | Wing | (Fiji) Kameli Ratuvou | 5 |
| 2008–09 | Fly-half | (South Africa) Neil de Kock | 3 |
| 2008–09 | Wing | (Fiji) Kameli Ratuvou (2) | 3 |
| 2009–10 | Flanker | (England) Andy Saull | 4 |
| 2010–11 | Centre | (England) Brad Barritt | 2 |
| 2010–11 | Wing | (England) David Strettle | 2 |
| 2011–12 | Number 8 | (South Africa) Ernst Joubert | 3 |
| 2012–13 | Wing | (England) Chris Ashton | 4 |
| 2013–14‡ | Wing | (England) Chris Ashton (2) | 11 |
| 2014–15 | Wing | (England) Chris Ashton (3) | 4 |
| 2015–16^{§} | Wing | (United States) Chris Wyles | 5 |
| 2016–17^{§} | Wing | (England) Chris Ashton (4) | 6 |
| 2017–18 | Full-back | (Wales) Liam Williams | 3 |
| 2018–19^{§} | Wing | (Scotland) Sean Maitland | 5 |
| 2019–20 | Lock | (England) Maro Itoje | 2 |
| 2019–20 | Wing | (England) Alex Lewington | 2 |
| 2019–20 | Wing | (England) Rotimi Segun | 2 |
| 2019–20 | Prop | (England) Mako Vunipola | 2 |
| 2021–22 | Wing | (Scotland) Sean Maitland (2) | 3 |
| 2022–23 | Full-back | (England) Elliot Daly | 4 |
| 2022–23 | Flanker | (England) Ben Earl | 4 |
| 2023–24 | Wing | (Argentina) Lucio Cinti | 2 |
| 2023–24 | Hooker | (England) Theo Dan | 2 |
| 2023–24 | Hooker | (England) Jamie George | 2 |
| 2023–24 | Flanker | (Argentina) Juan Martín González | 2 |
| 2023–24 | Centre | (England) Olly Hartley | 2 |
| 2023–24 | Lock | (England) Maro Itoje (2) | 2 |
| 2024–25 | Hooker | (England) Theo Dan (2) | 3 |
| 2024–25 | Flanker | (England) Ben Earl (2) | 3 |
| 2025–26 | Wing | (England) Noah Caluori | 2 |
| 2025–26 | Centre | (Argentina) Lucio Cinti (2) | 2 |
| 2025–26 | Hooker | (England) Theo Dan (3) | 2 |
| 2025–26 | Full-back | (England) Max Malins | 2 |
| 2025–26 | Wing | (England) Rotimi Segun (2) | 2 |
| 2025–26 | Number 8 | (England) Tom Willis | 2 |

Most points
| Season | Position | Player | Points |
|---|---|---|---|
| 1999–00 | Fly-half | (France) Thierry Lacroix | 62 |
| 2000–01 | Fly-half | (France) Thomas Castaignède | 63 |
| 2001–05 | Top scorers to be confirmed | | |
| 2005–06 | Fly-half | (New Zealand) Glen Jackson | 70 |
| 2006–07 | Fly-half | (New Zealand) Glen Jackson (2) | 88 |
| 2007–08 | Fly-half | (New Zealand) Glen Jackson (3) | 123 |
| 2008–09 | Fly-half | (New Zealand) Glen Jackson (4) | 106 |
| 2009–10 | Fly-half | (South Africa) Derick Hougaard | 43 |
| 2010–11 | Fly-half | (England) Owen Farrell | 39 |
| 2011–12 | Fly-half | (England) Owen Farrell (2) | 88 |
| 2012–13 | Fly-half | (England) Owen Farrell (3) | 104 |
| 2013–14‡ | Fly-half | (England) Owen Farrell (4) | 64 |
| 2014–15 | Fly-half | (England) Owen Farrell (5) | 40 |
| 2015–16^{§} | Fly-half | (England) Owen Farrell (6) | 127 |
| 2016–17^{§} | Fly-half | (England) Owen Farrell (7) | 126 |
| 2017–18 | Fly-half | (England) Owen Farrell (8) | 92 |
| 2018–19^{§} | Fly-half | (England) Owen Farrell (9) | 89 |
| 2019–20 | Full-back | (England) Alex Goode | 29 |
| 2021–22 | Fly-half | (England) Owen Farrell (10) | 60 |
| 2022–23 | Fly-half | (England) Owen Farrell (11) | 40 |
| 2023–24 | Fly-half | (England) Owen Farrell (12) | 40 |
| 2024–25 | Fly-half | (New Zealand) Fergus Burke | 32 |
| 2025–26 | Fly-half | (England) Owen Farrell (13) | 19 |

=== Notable records ===
The following European cup records have been set by Saracens:

Team

- Longest unbeaten streak in European competition – 20 matches
  - (14 November 2015–21 October 2017)
- Most points scored by one team in a European cup season – 450 points
  - (2001–2002)
- Most points scored by one team in a European cup match – 151 points
  - (vs. (Romania) Dinamo București; @ Vicarage Road, Watford; 20 October 2002)
- Biggest winning margin in a European cup match – 151 points
  - (vs. (Romania) Dinamo București; @ Vicarage Road, Watford; 20 October 2002)
- Most tries scored by one team in a European cup match – 23 tries
  - (vs. (Romania) Dinamo București; @ Vicarage Road, Watford; 20 October 2002)

Individual

- Most penalties scored by one player in a European cup match – 10 penalties
  - (England) Owen Farrell (vs. (France) Racing Métro; @ Stade de la Beaujoire, Nantes; 12 January 2013)

=== All-time statistics (Europe) ===
The following lists include the top 10 all-time statistical leaders for Saracens in European competition:

As of 31 October 2025

Bold italics indicate current Saracens players as of the 2025–26 season.

Appearances (Champions Cup)
| Rank | Player | Games |
|---|---|---|
| 1. | (England) Alex Goode | 77 |
| 2. | (England) Owen Farrell | 76 |
| 3. | (England) Jamie George | 74 |
| 4. | (England) Richard Wigglesworth | 69 |
| 5. | (England) Mako Vunipola | 66 |
| 6. | (England) Brad Barritt | 64 |
| 7. | (England) Jackson Wray | 61 |
| 8. | (England) George Kruis | 55 |
| 8. | (United States) Chris Wyles | 55 |
| 10. | (England) Billy Vunipola | 52 |

Points (Champions Cup)
| Rank | Player | Points |
|---|---|---|
| 1. | (England) Owen Farrell | 875 |
| 2. | (New Zealand) Glen Jackson | 193 |
| 3. | (England) Chris Ashton | 145 |
| 4. | (England) Alex Goode | 131 |
| 5. | (England) Charlie Hodgson | 114 |
| 6. | (United States) Chris Wyles | 105 |
| 7. | (England) David Strettle | 65 |
| 8. | (France) Thomas Castaignède | 63 |
| 9. | (France) Thierry Lacroix | 62 |
| 9. | (England) Alex Lozowski | 62 |

Tries (Champions Cup)
| Rank | Player | Tries |
|---|---|---|
| 1. | (England) Chris Ashton | 29 |
| 2. | (United States) Chris Wyles | 21 |
| 3. | (England) David Strettle | 13 |
| 4. | (Scotland) Sean Maitland | 12 |
| 5. | (England) Alex Goode | 10 |
| 6. | (England) Ben Earl | 9 |
| 6. | (England) Jamie George | 9 |
| 6. | (England) Mako Vunipola | 9 |
| 9. | (England) Maro Itoje | 8 |
| 10. | (England) Richard Hill | 7 |
| 10. | (England) Ben Spencer | 7 |
| 10. | (Wales) Nick Tompkins | 7 |

Appearances (Challenge Cup)
| Rank | Player | Games |
|---|---|---|
| 1. | (England) Alex Goode | 14 |
| 2. | (Italy) Matías Agüero | 13 |
| 2. | (Italy) Fabio Ongaro | 13 |
| 4. | (England) Steve Borthwick | 12 |
| 4. | (England) Noah Cato | 12 |
| 6. | (England) Rodd Penney | 11 |
| 6. | (England) Andy Saull | 11 |
| 8. | (New Zealand) Glen Jackson | 10 |
| 8. | (England) Adam Powell | 10 |
| 10. | (England) Tom Mercey | 9 |
| 10. | (Fiji) Kameli Ratuvou | 9 |
| 10. | (England) Hugh Vyvyan | 9 |
| 10. | (United States) Chris Wyles | 9 |

Points (Challenge Cup)
| Rank | Player | Points |
|---|---|---|
| 1. | (New Zealand) Glen Jackson | 137 |
| 2. | (England) Owen Farrell | 60 |
| 3. | (South Africa) Derick Hougaard | 43 |
| 4. | (Scotland) Gordon Ross | 29 |
| 5. | (England) Andy Saull | 25 |
| 6. | (England) Manu Vunipola | 18 |
| 7. | (South Africa) Neil de Kock | 15 |
| 7. | (Scotland) Sean Maitland | 15 |
| 7. | (England) Rodd Penney | 15 |
| 7. | (Fiji) Kameli Ratuvou | 15 |

Tries (Challenge Cup)
| Rank | Player | Tries |
|---|---|---|
| 1. | (England) Andy Saull | 5 |
| 2. | (South Africa) Neil de Kock | 3 |
| 2. | (Scotland) Sean Maitland | 3 |
| 2. | (England) Rodd Penney | 3 |
| 2. | (Fiji) Kameli Ratuvou | 3 |
| 6. | (England) Donald Barrell | 2 |
| 6. | (England) Noah Cato | 2 |
| 6. | (Scotland) Andy Christie | 2 |
| 6. | (Wales) Aled Davies | 2 |
| 6. | (England) Ben Earl | 2 |
| 6. | (England) Jamie George | 2 |
| 6. | (England) Alex Lewington | 2 |
| 6. | (Fiji) Eroni Mawi | 2 |
| 6. | (Fiji) Michael Tagicakibau | 2 |

=== European Cup Final XVs ===
The following graphics show the starting line-ups for Saracens in all four of the club's European Cup Final appearances:

Key
| Gold medal | Denotes that the team ended the final as European cup champions |
| Silver medal | Denotes that the team ended the final as European cup runners-up |

2014 Heineken Cup Final Starting XV

(vs. (France) Toulon)

2016 Champions Cup Final Starting XV

(vs. (France) Racing 92)

2017 Champions Cup Final Starting XV

(vs. (France) Clermont)

2019 Champions Cup Final Starting XV

(vs. (Ireland) Leinster)

== Premiership Rugby honours and records ==
The following Saracens players and coaches have achieved recognition at the annual Premiership Rugby Awards:

Key
| Player (X) | Name of the player and number of times that they had been nominated for the award at that point (if more than one) |
| § | Denotes that the club was also the winner of the domestic league or cup competition during the same season |
| ‡ | Denotes that the club was also the runner-up of the domestic league or cup competition during the same season |

Premiership Player of the Season
| Season | Nominated | Winner |
|---|---|---|
| 2010–11^{§} | (South Africa) Schalk Brits | — |
| 2011–12 | (England) Brad Barritt | — |
| 2012–13 | (England) Steve Borthwick | — |
| 2013–14‡ | (Namibia) Jacques Burger | — |
| 2014–15^{§} | (England) Billy Vunipola | — |
| 2015–16^{§} | (England) Alex Goode | (England) Alex Goode |
| 2015–16^{§} | (England) Maro Itoje | (England) Alex Goode |
| 2016–17 | (South Africa) Michael Rhodes | — |
| 2017–18^{§} | — | — |
| 2018–19^{§} | (England) Alex Goode (2) | — |
| 2019–20 | (England) Ben Earl (Note: Ben Earl played the first half of the 2019–20 season at Saracens, before going out on loan to Bristol Bears for the second half.) | — |
| 2020–21 | — | — |
| 2021–22‡ | (England) Ben Earl (2) | (England) Ben Earl |
| 2022–23^{§} | (England) Owen Farrell | — |
| 2023–24 | — | — |
| 2024–25 | (England) Tom Willis | — |
| 2025–26 | (England) Tom Willis (2) | (England) Tom Willis |

Premiership Young Player of the Season
| Season | Nominated | Winner |
|---|---|---|
| 2010–11^{§} | (England) Owen Farrell | — |
| 2011–12 | (England) Owen Farrell (2) | (England) Owen Farrell |
| 2012–13 | (England) Mako Vunipola | — |
| 2013–14‡ | (England) Billy Vunipola | (England) Billy Vunipola |
| 2014–15^{§} | (England) Maro Itoje | — |
| 2015–16^{§} | (England) Maro Itoje (2) | (England) Maro Itoje |
| 2016–17 | — | — |
| 2017–18^{§} | — | — |
| 2018–19^{§} | — | — |
| 2019–20 | (England) Ben Earl | — |
| 2020–21 | — | — |
| 2021–22‡ | — | — |
| 2022–23^{§} | — | — |
| 2023–24 | — | — |
| 2024–25 | — | — |
| 2025–26 | (England) Noah Caluori | (England) Noah Caluori |

Premiership Hall of Fame
| Year | Inductee | Notes |
|---|---|---|
| 2008 | (England) Dean Ryan | Saracens player 1989–1995 |
| 2013 | (England) George Chuter | Saracens player 1996–2000 |
| 2013 | (England) Charlie Hodgson | Saracens player 2011–2016 |
| 2016 | (England) Richard Hill | Saracens player 1993–2008 |
| 2016 | (England) Hugh Vyvyan | Saracens player 2004–2012 |
| 2017 | (England) Steve Borthwick | Saracens player 2008–2014 |
| 2017 | (England) Kyran Bracken | Saracens player 1996–2006 |
| 2019 | (England) Jason Leonard | Saracens player 1989–1990 |
| 2023 | (England) Brad Barritt | Saracens player 2008–2020 |
| 2024 | (England) Danny Grewcock | Saracens player 1997–2001 |
| 2024 | (England) Richard Wigglesworth | Saracens player 2010–2020 |

Premiership Director of Rugby of the Season
| Season | Nominated | Winner |
|---|---|---|
| 2006–07 | (Australia) Alan Gaffney | — |
| 2012–13 | (Ireland) Mark McCall | (Ireland) Mark McCall |
| 2013–14‡ | (Ireland) Mark McCall (2) | (Ireland) Mark McCall (2) |
| 2015–16^{§} | (Ireland) Mark McCall (3) | (Ireland) Mark McCall (3) |
| 2016–17 | (Ireland) Mark McCall (4) | — |
| 2017–18^{§} | (Ireland) Mark McCall (5) | — |
| 2018–19^{§} | (Ireland) Mark McCall (6) | (Ireland) Mark McCall (4) |
| 2021–22‡ | (Ireland) Mark McCall (7) | — |
| 2022–23^{§} | (Ireland) Mark McCall (8) | (Ireland) Mark McCall (5) |
| 2023–24 | (Ireland) Mark McCall (9) | — |

Premiership Team of the Season
| Season | Selections | No. | Players | Positions |
|---|---|---|---|---|
| 2000–01 | 2 | 5. | (England) Danny Grewcock | Lock |
| 2000–01 | 2 | 7. | (England) Richard Hill | Openside flanker |
| 2001–04 | N/A | Team of the Season not awarded | | |
| 2004–05 | 0 | No players selected | | |
| 2005–06 | 1 | 3. | (South Africa) Cobus Visagie | Tighthead prop |
| 2006–07 | 1 | 10. | (New Zealand) Glen Jackson | Fly-half |
| 2007–08 | 1 | 15. | (England) Richard Haughton | Full-back |
| 2008–09 | 0 | No players selected | | |
| 2009–10‡ | 4 | 2. | (South Africa) Schalk Brits | Hooker |
| 2009–10‡ | 4 | 8. | (South Africa) Ernst Joubert | Number 8 |
| 2009–10‡ | 4 | 12. | (England) Brad Barritt | Inside centre |
| 2009–10‡ | 4 | 15. | (England) Alex Goode | Full-back |
| 2010–11^{§} | 3 | 2. | (South Africa) Schalk Brits (2) | Hooker |
| 2010–11^{§} | 3 | 7. | (Namibia) Jacques Burger | Openside flanker |
| 2010–11^{§} | 3 | 14. | (England) David Strettle | Wing |
| 2011–12 | 1 | 2. | (South Africa) Schalk Brits (3) | Hooker |
| 2012–13 | 1 | 1. | (England) Mako Vunipola | Loosehead prop |
| 2013–14‡ | 2 | 7. | (Namibia) Jacques Burger (2) | Openside flanker |
| 2013–14‡ | 2 | 8. | (England) Billy Vunipola | Number 8 |
| 2014–15^{§} | 1 | 2. | (England) Jamie George | Hooker |
| 2015–16^{§} | 5 | 1. | (England) Mako Vunipola (2) | Loosehead prop |
| 2015–16^{§} | 5 | 4. | (England) Maro Itoje | Lock |
| 2015–16^{§} | 5 | 5. | (England) George Kruis | Lock |
| 2015–16^{§} | 5 | 8. | (England) Billy Vunipola (2) | Number 8 |
| 2015–16^{§} | 5 | 15. | (England) Alex Goode (2) | Full-back |
| 2016–17 | 5 | 1. | (England) Mako Vunipola (3) | Loosehead prop |
| 2016–17 | 5 | 2. | (England) Jamie George (2) | Hooker |
| 2016–17 | 5 | 7. | (England) Jackson Wray | Openside flanker |
| 2016–17 | 5 | 9. | (England) Richard Wigglesworth | Scrum-half |
| 2016–17 | 5 | 12. | (England) Brad Barritt (2) (c) | Inside centre |
| 2017–18^{§} | 0 | No players selected | | |
| 2018–19^{§} | 4 | 1. | (England) Mako Vunipola (4) | Loosehead prop |
| 2018–19^{§} | 4 | 2. | (England) Jamie George (3) | Hooker |
| 2018–19^{§} | 4 | 5. | (Australia) Will Skelton | Lock |
| 2018–19^{§} | 4 | 15. | (England) Alex Goode (3) | Full-back |
| 2019–20 | 3 | 5. | (England) Maro Itoje (2) | Lock |
| 2019–20 | 3 | 7. | (England) Ben Earl | Openside flanker |
| 2019–20 | 3 | 9. | (England) Ben Spencer (Note: Ben Spencer played the first half of the 2019–20 season at Saracens, before transferring to Bath for the second half.) | Scrum-half |
| 2020–21 | 0 | No players selected | | |
| 2021–22‡ | 2 | 7. | (England) Ben Earl (2) | Openside flanker |
| 2021–22‡ | 2 | 14. | (England) Max Malins | Right wing |
| 2022–23^{§} | 2 | 3. | (Italy) Marco Riccioni | Tighthead prop |
| 2022–23^{§} | 2 | 6. | (England) Ben Earl (3) | Blindside flanker |
| 2023–24 | 1 | 7. | (England) Ben Earl (4) | Openside flanker |
| 2024–25 | 2 | 4. | (England) Maro Itoje (3) | Lock |
| 2024–25 | 2 | 8. | (England) Tom Willis | Number 8 |
| 2025–26 | 1 | 8. | (England) Tom Willis (2) | Number 8 |

Community Player of the Season
| Season | Nominated | Winner |
|---|---|---|
| 2010–11^{§} | (United States) Hayden Smith | (United States) Hayden Smith |
| 2011–12 | (England) Will Fraser | — |
| 2012–13 | (England) Jamie George | (England) Jamie George |
| 2013–14‡ | (England) Jamie George (2) | — |
| 2014–15^{§} | (England) Jamie George (3) | (England) Jamie George (2) |
| 2015–16^{§} | (England) Will Fraser (2) | — |
| 2016–17 | (England) Chris Ashton | — |
| 2017–18^{§} | (England) Joel Kpoku | — |
| 2018–19^{§} | (England) Calum Clark | — |
| 2019–20 | — | — |
| 2020–21 | — | — |
| 2021–22‡ | (Scotland) Sean Maitland | — |
| 2022–23^{§} | (Scotland) Sean Maitland (2) | (Scotland) Sean Maitland |
| 2023–24 | (Scotland) Andy Christie | (Scotland) Andy Christie |
| 2024–25 | (England) Olly Hartley | — |

Premiership Player of the Month
| Season | Month | Winner | Ref |
|---|---|---|---|
| 2010–11^{§} | September | (Namibia) Jacques Burger | |
| 2010–11^{§} | February | (South Africa) Ernst Joubert | |
| 2011–12 | October | (England) Owen Farrell | |
| 2013–14‡ | September | (Namibia) Jacques Burger (2) | |
| 2013–14‡ | April | (England) Chris Ashton | |
| 2015–16^{§} | December | (England) Maro Itoje | |
| 2016–17 | October | (England) Mako Vunipola | |
| 2018–19^{§} | October | (England) Alex Goode | |
| 2022–23^{§} | September | (Samoa) Theo McFarland | |
| 2022–23^{§} | October | (England) Alex Goode (2) | |

Peter Deakin Medal
| Final | No. | Player of the Match | Position |
|---|---|---|---|
| 2010–11^{§} | 2. | (South Africa) Schalk Brits | Hooker |
| 2014–15^{§} | 10. | (England) Owen Farrell | Fly-half |
| 2015–16^{§} | 15. | (England) Alex Goode | Full-back |
| 2017–18^{§} | 1. | (England) Mako Vunipola | Loosehead prop |
| 2018–19^{§} | 6. | (England) Maro Itoje | Blindside flanker |
| 2022–23^{§} | 10. | (England) Owen Farrell (2) | Fly-half |

Premiership Try of the Season
| Season | Date | Round | Position | Nominated | Opponent | Stadium | Location | Winner |
|---|---|---|---|---|---|---|---|---|
| 2010–11^{§} | 24 April 2011 | 21 | Hooker | (South Africa) Schalk Brits | vs. Gloucester | Vicarage Road | Watford | (South Africa) Schalk Brits |
| 2013–14‡ | 13 April 2014 | 19 | Flanker | (Scotland) Kelly Brown | vs. Northampton | Allianz Park | Hendon | — |
| 2021–22‡ | 21 May 2022 | 25 | Flanker | (Samoa) Theo McFarland | vs. Northampton | StoneX Stadium | Hendon | — |
| 2025–26 | 12 October 2025 | 3 | Fly-half | (Scotland) Fergus Burke | vs. Harlequins | Twickenham Stoop | London | — |
| 2025–26 | 25 April 2026 | 14 | Wing | (England) Noah Caluori | vs. Leicester | StoneX Stadium | Hendon | — |

Premiership Golden Boot
| Season | Position | Player | Points | Games | PPG |
|---|---|---|---|---|---|
| 1997–98‡ | Fly-half | (Australia) Michael Lynagh | 279 | 19 | 14.68 |
| 2006–07 | Fly-half | (New Zealand) Glen Jackson | 281 | 22 | 12.77 |
| 2008–09 | Fly-half | (New Zealand) Glen Jackson (2) | 239 | 21 | 11.38 |
| 2017–18^{§} | Fly-half | (England) Owen Farrell | 217 | 15 | 14.46 |

Premiership Top Try Scorer
| Season | Position | Player | Tries | Games | TPG |
|---|---|---|---|---|---|
| 2019–20 | Flanker | (England) Ben Earl | 11 | 16 | 0.68 |
| 2021–22‡ | Wing | (England) Max Malins | 16 | 15 | 1.07 |

=== Premiership Team of the Decade ===
The following Saracens players were named in the Premiership Rugby Team of the Decade for the 2010s. The starting XV is made up of the players who recorded the most appearances in their respective positions, across all teams in the league, between January 2010 and December 2019, with the bench consisting of the players with the second most caps in each position.

Starters
| Number | Position | Player | Caps (2010–19) |
|---|---|---|---|
| 11 | Left wing | (United States) Chris Wyles | 81 |
| 12 | Inside centre | (England) Brad Barritt | 157 |
| 15 | Full-back | (England) Alex Goode | 159 |

Replacements
| Number | Position | Player | Caps (2010–19) |
|---|---|---|---|
| 16 | Hooker | (England) Jamie George | 68 |
| 18 | Tighthead prop | (South Africa) Petrus du Plessis | 66 |
| 21 | Scrum-half | (England) Richard Wigglesworth | 72 |

=== Premiership Immortals ===
The following Saracens players were named in the Premiership Immortals XV, a team of 15 players selected by BT Sport rugby union commentators and former England internationals Lawrence Dallaglio, Austin Healey, Ben Kay and Ugo Monye in May 2023, to celebrate 20 years of Premiership Finals.

Forwards
| Number | Position | Player |
|---|---|---|
| 2 | Hooker | (South Africa) Schalk Brits |
| 5 | Lock | (England) Maro Itoje |

Backs
| Number | Position | Player |
|---|---|---|
| 10 | Fly-half | (England) Owen Farrell |
| 12 | Inside centre | (England) Brad Barritt |
| 14 | Right wing | (England) Chris Ashton |

=== Highest scorers by Premiership season ===
The following lists include the top try scorers and top points scorers for Saracens during each Premiership season from 1997–1998 onwards:

Most tries
| Season | Position | Player | Tries |
|---|---|---|---|
| 1997–98‡ | Wing | (Ireland) Richard Wallace | 8 |
| 1998–99 | Wing | (New Zealand) Brendon Daniel | 12 |
| 1999–00 | Wing | (Australia) Ryan Constable | 12 |
| 2000–01 | Wing | (England) Dan Luger | 6 |
| 2001–02 | Centre | (Australia) Tim Horan | 4 |
| 2002–03 | Fly-half | (France) Thomas Castaignède | 6 |
| 2002–03 | Wing | (England) Richard Haughton | 6 |
| 2003–04 | Fly-half | (France) Thomas Castaignède (2) | 7 |
| 2003–04 | Wing | (England) Richard Haughton (2) | 7 |
| 2004–05 | Wing | (England) Richard Haughton (3) | 4 |
| 2004–05 | Centre | (England) Ben Johnston | 4 |
| 2005–06 | Full-back | (England) Dan Scarbrough | 7 |
| 2006–07 | Wing | (Fiji) Kameli Ratuvou | 7 |
| 2007–08 | Centre | (England) Adam Powell | 7 |
| 2008–09 | Wing | (England) Noah Cato | 4 |
| 2008–09 | Centre | (England) Rodd Penney | 4 |
| 2009–10‡ | Hooker | (South Africa) Schalk Brits | 7 |
| 2010–11^{§} | Hooker | (South Africa) Schalk Brits (2) | 6 |
| 2010–11^{§} | Wing | (England) James Short | 6 |
| 2011–12 | Number 8 | (South Africa) Ernst Joubert | 4 |
| 2011–12 | Wing | (England) James Short (2) | 4 |
| 2012–13 | Wing | (England) David Strettle | 8 |
| 2013–14‡ | Wing | (England) David Strettle (2) | 11 |
| 2014–15^{§} | Wing | (England) Chris Ashton | 13 |
| 2014–15^{§} | Wing | (United States) Chris Wyles | 13 |
| 2015–16^{§} | Wing | (England) Chris Ashton (2) | 11 |
| 2016–17 | Wing | (England) Chris Ashton (3) | 9 |
| 2017–18^{§} | Scrum-half | (England) Ben Spencer | 11 |
| 2017–18^{§} | Wing | (United States) Chris Wyles (2) | 11 |
| 2018–19^{§} | Centre | (Wales) Nick Tompkins | 11 |
| 2019–20 | Flanker | (England) Ben Earl | 7 |
| 2019–20 | Wing | (England) Rotimi Segun | 7 |
| 2020–21^{§} | Wing | (England) Alex Lewington | 8 |
| 2021–22‡ | Wing | (England) Max Malins | 16 |
| 2022–23^{§} | Wing | (England) Max Malins (2) | 11 |
| 2023–24 | Wing | (England) Alex Lewington (2) | 10 |
| 2024–25 | Hooker | (England) Jamie George | 8 |
| 2025–26 | Wing | (England) Noah Caluori | 18 |

Most points
| Season | Position | Player | Points |
|---|---|---|---|
| 1997–98‡ | Fly-half | (Australia) Michael Lynagh | 279 |
| 1998–99 | Full-back | (South Africa) Gavin Johnson | 318 |
| 1999–00 | Fly-half | (France) Thierry Lacroix | 280 |
| 2000–01 | Fly-half | (France) Thomas Castaignède | 131 |
| 2001–02 | Fly-half | (South Africa) Luke Smith | 194 |
| 2002–03 | Fly-half | (England) Andy Goode | 204 |
| 2003–04 | Fly-half | (England) Andy Goode (2) | 115 |
| 2004–05 | Fly-half | (New Zealand) Glen Jackson | 77 |
| 2005–06 | Fly-half | (New Zealand) Glen Jackson (2) | 238 |
| 2006–07 | Fly-half | (New Zealand) Glen Jackson (3) | 281 |
| 2007–08 | Fly-half | (New Zealand) Glen Jackson (4) | 179 |
| 2008–09 | Fly-half | (New Zealand) Glen Jackson (5) | 239 |
| 2009–10‡ | Fly-half | (New Zealand) Glen Jackson (6) | 178 |
| 2010–11^{§} | Full-back | (England) Alex Goode | 144 |
| 2011–12 | Fly-half | (England) Owen Farrell | 195 |
| 2012–13 | Fly-half | (England) Charlie Hodgson | 212 |
| 2013–14‡ | Fly-half | (England) Owen Farrell (2) | 157 |
| 2014–15^{§} | Fly-half | (England) Charlie Hodgson (2) | 152 |
| 2015–16^{§} | Fly-half | (England) Charlie Hodgson (3) | 154 |
| 2016–17 | Centre | (England) Alex Lozowski | 175 |
| 2017–18^{§} | Fly-half | (England) Owen Farrell (3) | 217 |
| 2018–19^{§} | Fly-half | (England) Owen Farrell (4) | 143 |
| 2019–20 | Fly-half | (England) Manu Vunipola | 98 |
| 2020–21^{§} | Fly-half | (England) Owen Farrell (5) | 102 |
| 2021–22‡ | Centre | (England) Alex Lozowski (2) | 178 |
| 2022–23^{§} | Fly-half | (England) Owen Farrell (6) | 153 |
| 2023–24 | Fly-half | (England) Owen Farrell (7) | 103 |
| 2024–25 | Fly-half | (New Zealand) Fergus Burke | 90 |
| 2025–26 | Fly-half | (England) Owen Farrell (8) | 110 |

=== Notable records ===
The following Premiership records have been set by Saracens:

==== Team ====
- Longest winning streak by one Premiership club against another – 24 victories
  - (vs. Newcastle Falcons; 4 October 2009–30 December 2023)

==== Individual ====
General

- Most career appearances in the Premiership against a single club – 30 matches
  - (England) Alex Goode (vs. Northampton Saints; 2009–2024)
- Most career points scored in the Premiership against a single club – 278 points
  - (England) Owen Farrell (vs. Harlequins; 2010–2024)
- Most tries scored in a Premiership match – 6 tries (tied with 1 other)
  - (Australia) Ryan Constable (vs. Bedford Blues; @ Goldington Road, Bedford; 16 April 2000)
- Most tries scored against one team in a single season – 10 tries
  - (England) Noah Caluori (vs. Sale Sharks; 2025–26)
- Earliest hat-trick scored in a Premiership match – 20 minutes, 25 seconds
  - (England) Tom Parton (vs. Gloucester; @ StoneX Stadium, Hendon; 20 April 2024)
- Largest age difference between starting half-backs in a Premiership match – 16 years, 330 days
  - (England) Manu Vunipola / (England) Richard Wigglesworth (vs. Leicester Tigers; @ Welford Road, Leicester; 27 October 2019)

Play-offs

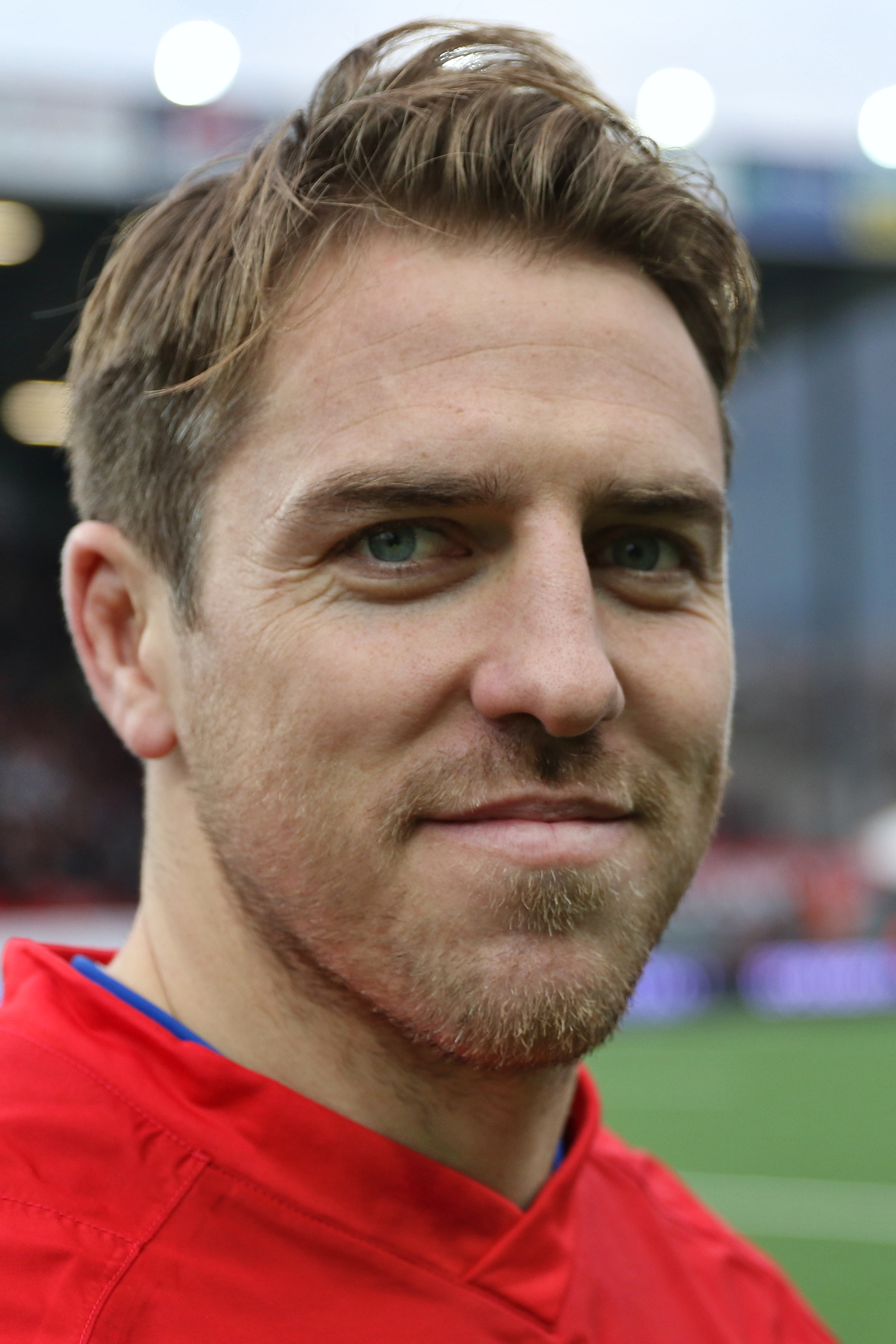
Chris Wyles holds the record for most tries scored in Premiership finals, with 4 tries in 3 appearances.

- Most career appearances in Premiership finals – 9 starts
  - (England) Alex Goode (2010–2023)
- Most time played in Premiership finals – 12 hours, 20 minutes
  - (England) Alex Goode (2010–2023)
- Most career points scored in Premiership finals – 95 points
  - (England) Owen Farrell (2011–2023)
- Most career tries scored in Premiership finals – 4 tries
  - (United States) Chris Wyles (2015–2018)
- Most career conversions scored in Premiership finals – 12 conversions
  - (England) Owen Farrell (2011–2023)
- Most career penalties scored in Premiership finals – 22 penalties
  - (England) Owen Farrell (2011–2023)
- Most tries scored in a Premiership final – 2 tries (tied with 3 others)
  - (South Africa) Ernst Joubert (vs. Leicester Tigers; @ Twickenham Stadium, London; 29 May 2010)
  - (United States) Chris Wyles (vs. Exeter Chiefs; @ Twickenham Stadium, London; 26 May 2018)
  - (England) Jamie George (vs. Exeter Chiefs; @ Twickenham Stadium, London; 1 June 2019)
- Oldest player to score a try in a Premiership final – 34 years, 256 days
  - (United States) Chris Wyles (vs. Exeter Chiefs; @ Twickenham Stadium, London; 26 May 2018)

=== All-time statistics (Premiership) ===
The following lists include the top 10 all-time statistical leaders for Saracens in Premiership Rugby:

As of 31 October 2025

Bold italics indicate current Saracens players as of the 2025–26 season.

Appearances
| Rank | Player | Games |
|---|---|---|
| 1. | (England) Alex Goode | 284 |
| 2. | (England) Jackson Wray | 215 |
| 3. | (England) Jamie George | 208 |
| 4. | (England) Brad Barritt | 190 |
| 5. | (United States) Chris Wyles | 181 |
| 6. | (South Africa) Neil de Kock | 178 |
| 7. | (England) Richard Wigglesworth | 173 |
| 8. | (England) Owen Farrell | 166 |
| 9. | (South Africa) Schalk Brits | 157 |
| 10. | (England) Mako Vunipola | 153 |

Points
| Rank | Player | Points |
|---|---|---|
| 1. | (England) Owen Farrell | 1,790 |
| 2. | (New Zealand) Glen Jackson | 1,204 |
| 3. | (England) Charlie Hodgson | 738 |
| 4. | (England) Alex Goode | 677 |
| 5. | (England) Alex Lozowski | 635 |
| 6. | (England) Ben Spencer | 273 |
| 7. | (England) Chris Ashton | 254 |
| 8. | (United States) Chris Wyles | 235 |
| 9. | (England) Jamie George | 215 |
| 10. | (England) David Strettle | 200 |

Tries
| Rank | Player | Tries |
|---|---|---|
| 1. | (United States) Chris Wyles | 47 |
| 2. | (England) Chris Ashton | 46 |
| 3. | (England) Jamie George | 43 |
| 4. | (England) David Strettle | 40 |
| 5. | (England) Alex Lewington | 38 |
| 6. | (Scotland) Sean Maitland | 37 |
| 7. | (England) Alex Goode | 36 |
| 7. | (Wales) Nick Tompkins | 36 |
| 9. | (England) Max Malins | 35 |
| 10. | (South Africa) Schalk Brits | 31 |
| 10. | (England) Ben Earl | 31 |

=== Premiership Final XVs ===
The following graphics show the starting line-ups for Saracens in all nine of the club's Premiership Final appearances:

Key
| Gold medal | Denotes that the team ended the final as league champions |
| Silver medal | Denotes that the team ended the final as league runners-up |

2010 Aviva Premiership Final Starting XV

(vs. Leicester Tigers)

2011 Aviva Premiership Final Starting XV

(vs. Leicester Tigers)

2014 Aviva Premiership Final Starting XV

(vs. Northampton Saints)

2015 Aviva Premiership Final Starting XV

(vs. Bath)

2016 Aviva Premiership Final Starting XV

(vs. Exeter Chiefs)

2018 Aviva Premiership Final Starting XV

(vs. Exeter Chiefs)

2019 Gallagher Premiership Final Starting XV

(vs. Exeter Chiefs)

2022 Gallagher Premiership Final Starting XV

(vs. Leicester Tigers)

2023 Gallagher Premiership Final Starting XV

(vs. Sale Sharks)

==== A League Final XVs ====
The following graphics show the starting line-ups for Saracens Storm in all three of the club's Premiership Rugby Shield (formerly A League) Final appearances:

2013 Premiership A League Final Starting XV

(vs. Harlequins)

2015 Premiership A League Final Starting XV

(vs. Worcester Warriors)

2019 Premiership Rugby Shield Final Starting XV

(vs. Newcastle Falcons)

==== Sevens Squads ====
The following lists show the Saracens squads in all seven of the club's final appearances in rugby sevens tournaments – namely, the Premiership Rugby Sevens Series, the Melrose Sevens and the London City Sevens:

2010 Premiership 7s Final

- (England) Luke Baldwin
- (England) Donald Barrell
- (England) Kevin Barrett
- (England) Noah Cato
- (England) Owen Farrell
- (England) George Kruis
- (England) Nils Mordt
- (England) Ben Ransom
- (England) Jake Sharp
- (England) Henry Staff
- (England) Dave Vincent
- (England) Jackson Wray

2011 Premiership 7s Final

- (England) Josh Bassett
- (Wales) JB Bruzulier
- (England) Will Fraser
- (England) Matt Hankin
- (England) Tom Jubb
- (England) Rodd Penney
- (England) Ben Ransom
- (England) James Short
- (England) Scott Spurling
- (England) Marcus Watson
- (England) Jackson Wray
- (United States) Chris Wyles

2012 Melrose 7s Final

- (England) Tom Jubb
- (New Zealand) Joe Maddock
- (England) Nils Mordt
- (Scotland) Ali Price
- (England) Ben Ransom
- (Fiji) Kameli Ratuvou
- (South Africa) Jared Saunders
- (Ireland) Eoin Sheriff
- (England) Scott Spurling
- (Scotland) Duncan Taylor

2013 Melrose 7s Final

- (England) Nathan Earle
- (England) Tom Jubb
- (New Zealand) Joe Maddock
- (England) Nils Mordt
- (England) Aaron Morris
- (England) Andy Saull
- (England) James Short
- (England) Ben Spencer
- (England) Scott Spurling
- (England) Hayden Stringer
- (Wales) Nick Tompkins
- (New Zealand) Jack Wilson

2018 Premiership 7s Final

- (England) Reuben Bird-Tulloch
- (England) Joel Conlon (c)
- (Italy) Matt Gallagher
- (England) Tom Griffiths
- (England) Dom Morris
- (England) Oli Morris
- (Fiji) Siva Naulago
- (England) Sean Reffell
- (England) Rotimi Segun
- (Wales) Nick Tompkins
- (Fiji) Mitieli Vulikijapani
- (England) Manu Vunipola

2019 Premiership 7s Final

- (Scotland) Andy Christie
- (England) Ali Crossdale
- (England) Alex Day
- (England) Josh Hallett
- (England) Tobias Munday
- (England) Elliott Obatoyinbo
- (England) Sean Reffell
- (England) Rotimi Segun
- (England) Ollie Stonham
- (England) Manu Vunipola
- (England) Charlie Watson
- (England) Tom Whiteley (c)

2025 London City 7s Final

- (England) Tayo Adegbemile
- (England) Noah Caluori
- (England) Mason Cullen
- (South Africa) Luke Davidson
- (England) Reggie Hammick
- (England) Finn Keylock
- (England) Barnaby Merrett
- (England) Ben Morrow
- (New Zealand) Declan Murphy
- (England) Asa Stewart-Harris
- (England) Charlie West

==== Championship Final XVs ====
The following graphics show the starting line-ups for Saracens in both of the club's Championship Play-off Final appearances:

2021 RFU Championship Play-off (1st Leg) Starting XV

(vs. Ealing Trailfinders)

2021 RFU Championship Play-off (2nd Leg) Starting XV

(vs. Ealing Trailfinders)

== Domestic cup honours and records ==
The following Saracens players have achieved recognition in English domestic cup competitions past and present – the RFU Knockout Cup, the Anglo-Welsh Cup, and the Premiership Rugby Cup:

English Cup Breakthrough Player of the Season
| Season | Nominated | Winner |
|---|---|---|
| 2011–12 | (England) Jamie George | — |
| 2012–13 | — | — |
| 2013–14 | (England) Matt Hankin, (England) Ben Ransom | — |
| 2014–15^{§} | (England) Matt Hankin (2) | — |
| 2015–16 | No competition was held during this season because of the 2015 Rugby World Cup | |
| 2016–17 | (England) Tom Whiteley | — |
| 2017–18 | (England) Ben Earl, (Italy) Matt Gallagher, (Tonga) Sione Vailanu | — |
| 2018–19‡ | (Italy) Matt Gallagher (2), (England) Joel Kpoku, (England) Tom Whiteley (2) | — |
| 2019–20 | (England) Sean Reffell, (England) Manu Vunipola | — |
| 2020–21 | No competition was held during this season because of the COVID-19 pandemic | |

=== Highest scorers by domestic cup season ===
The following lists include the top try scorers and top points scorers for Saracens during each domestic cup season from 2008–2009 onwards:

Most tries
| Season | Position | Player | Tries |
|---|---|---|---|
| 2008–09 | Wing | (England) Noah Cato | 3 |
| 2009–10 | Flanker | (Germany) Justin Melck | 2 |
| 2010–11 | Wing | (United States) Chris Wyles | 3 |
| 2011–12 | Centre | (England) Joel Tomkins | 2 |
| 2012–13 | Hooker | (England) Jamie George | 1 |
| 2012–13 | Number 8 | (South Africa) Ernst Joubert | 1 |
| 2012–13 | Wing | (New Zealand) Joe Maddock | 1 |
| 2012–13 | Wing | (Fiji) Kameli Ratuvou | 1 |
| 2012–13 | Flanker | (England) Andy Saull | 1 |
| 2012–13 | Wing | (England) James Short | 1 |
| 2012–13 | Centre | (Scotland) Duncan Taylor | 1 |
| 2012–13 | Centre | (England) Joel Tomkins (2) | 1 |
| 2013–14 | Full-back | (England) Ben Ransom | 3 |
| 2013–14 | Flanker | (England) Jackson Wray | 3 |
| 2014–15^{§} | Flanker | (South Africa) Nick de Jager | 3 |
| 2014–15^{§} | Wing | (England) David Strettle | 3 |
| 2015–16 | No competition held due to 2015 Rugby World Cup | | |
| 2016–17 | Centre | (Wales) Nick Tompkins | 3 |
| 2016–17 | Scrum-half | (England) Tom Whiteley | 3 |
| 2017–18 | Scrum-half | (England) Tom Whiteley (2) | 3 |
| 2018–19‡ | Lock | (England) Joel Kpoku | 3 |
| 2018–19‡ | Number 8 | (Tonga) Sione Vailanu | 3 |
| 2019–20 | Centre | (Wales) Nick Tompkins (2) | 4 |
| 2019–20 | Wing | (England) Rotimi Segun | 4 |
| 2020–21 | No competition held due to COVID-19 pandemic | | |
| 2021–22 | Wing | (England) Rotimi Segun (2) | 4 |
| 2022–23 | Hooker | (England) Samson Adejimi | 4 |
| 2023–24 | Flanker | (England) Toby Knight | 5 |
| 2024–25 | Wing | (England) Brandon Jackson | 7 |

Most points
| Season | Position | Player | Points |
|---|---|---|---|
| 2008–09 | Fly-half | (Scotland) Gordon Ross | 30 |
| 2009–10 | Fly-half | (New Zealand) Glen Jackson | 37 |
| 2010–11 | Scrum-half | (England) Richard Wigglesworth | 20 |
| 2011–12 | Fly-half | (England) Owen Farrell | 28 |
| 2012–13 | Fly-half | (England) Nils Mordt | 42 |
| 2013–14 | Scrum-half | (England) Ben Spencer | 60 |
| 2014–15^{§} | Scrum-half | (England) Ben Spencer (2) | 75 |
| 2015–16 | No competition held due to 2015 Rugby World Cup | | |
| 2016–17 | Scrum-half | (England) Tom Whiteley | 41 |
| 2017–18 | Fly-half | (England) Max Malins | 46 |
| 2018–19‡ | Fly-half | (England) Max Malins (2) | 41 |
| 2019–20 | Scrum-half | (England) Tom Whiteley (2) | 41 |
| 2020–21 | No competition held due to COVID-19 pandemic | | |
| 2021–22 | Fly-half | (England) Manu Vunipola | 29 |
| 2022–23 | Hooker | (England) Samson Adejimi | 20 |
| 2023–24 | Fly-half | (England) Manu Vunipola (2) | 39 |
| 2024–25 | Wing | (England) Brandon Jackson | 35 |

=== Notable individual records ===
The following individual English domestic cup records have been set by Saracens players:

- Most tries scored by one player in a domestic cup match – 6 tries
  - (England) James Hadfield (vs. London Scottish; @ StoneX Stadium, Hendon; 9 November 2024)

=== All-time statistics (domestic cups) ===
The following lists include the top 10 all-time statistical leaders for Saracens in domestic cup competitions:

As of 31 October 2025

Bold italics indicate current Saracens players as of the 2025–26 season.

Appearances (Anglo-Welsh Cup)
| Rank | Player | Games |
|---|---|---|
| 1. | (England) Nils Mordt | 21 |
| 2. | (England) Ben Spencer | 20 |
| 3. | (England) Adam Powell | 18 |
| 3. | (England) Ben Ransom | 18 |
| 5. | (South Africa) Jared Saunders | 17 |
| 5. | (United States) Hayden Smith | 17 |
| 7. | (England) Mouritz Botha | 16 |
| 7. | (South Africa) Petrus du Plessis | 16 |
| 7. | (England) Hugh Vyvyan | 16 |
| 7. | (England) Jackson Wray | 16 |

Points (Anglo-Welsh Cup)
| Rank | Player | Points |
|---|---|---|
| 1. | (England) Ben Spencer | 189 |
| 2. | (New Zealand) Glen Jackson | 124 |
| 3. | (England) Nils Mordt | 65 |
| 4. | (Scotland) Gordon Ross | 64 |
| 5. | (England) Tom Whiteley | 56 |
| 6. | (England) Max Malins | 54 |
| 7. | (England) Owen Farrell | 39 |
| 8. | (England) Jamie George | 25 |
| 8. | (Germany) Justin Melck | 25 |
| 8. | (Fiji) Kameli Ratuvou | 25 |
| 8. | (Wales) Nick Tompkins | 25 |

Tries (Anglo-Welsh Cup)
| Rank | Player | Tries |
|---|---|---|
| 1. | (England) Tom Whiteley | 6 |
| 2. | (England) Jamie George | 5 |
| 2. | (Germany) Justin Melck | 5 |
| 2. | (Fiji) Kameli Ratuvou | 5 |
| 2. | (Wales) Nick Tompkins | 5 |
| 6. | (England) Noah Cato | 4 |
| 6. | (England) Rodd Penney | 4 |
| 6. | (England) Ben Ransom | 4 |
| 6. | (England) Jackson Wray | 4 |
| 10. | 13 players tied | 3 |

Appearances (Premiership Rugby Cup)
| Rank | Player | Games |
|---|---|---|
| 1. | (England) Rotimi Segun | 16 |
| 2. | (England) Sam Crean | 15 |
| 2. | (England) Brandon Jackson | 15 |
| 2. | (England) Manu Vunipola | 15 |
| 5. | (England) Nathan Michelow | 13 |
| 6. | (England) Charlie Bracken | 11 |
| 6. | (Italy) Matt Gallagher | 11 |
| 6. | (Scotland) Callum Hunter-Hill | 11 |
| 6. | (England) Toby Knight | 11 |
| 6. | (England) Dom Morris | 11 |
| 6. | (England) Tom Whiteley | 11 |

Points (Premiership Rugby Cup)
| Rank | Player | Points |
|---|---|---|
| 1. | (England) Manu Vunipola | 79 |
| 2. | (England) Rotimi Segun | 75 |
| 3. | (England) Tom Whiteley | 50 |
| 4. | (England) Max Malins | 46 |
| 5. | (England) Brandon Jackson | 45 |
| 6. | (England) Samson Adejimi | 30 |
| 6. | (England) James Hadfield | 30 |
| 8. | (England) Louie Johnson | 28 |
| 8. | (England) Ben Spencer | 28 |
| 10. | (England) Alex Lozowski | 27 |

Tries (Premiership Rugby Cup)
| Rank | Player | Tries |
|---|---|---|
| 1. | (England) Rotimi Segun | 15 |
| 2. | (England) Brandon Jackson | 9 |
| 3. | (England) Samson Adejimi | 6 |
| 3. | (England) James Hadfield | 6 |
| 5. | (England) Ben Harris | 5 |
| 5. | (England) Toby Knight | 5 |
| 7. | (Wales) Nick Tompkins | 4 |
| 8. | 10 players tied | 3 |

=== Domestic Cup Final XVs ===
The following graphics show the starting line-ups for Saracens in all three of the club's domestic cup final appearances:

Key
| Gold medal | Denotes that the team ended the final as cup champions |
| Silver medal | Denotes that the team ended the final as cup runners-up |

1998 Tetley's Bitter Cup Final Starting XV

(vs. Wasps)

2015 LV Cup Final Starting XV

(vs. Exeter Chiefs)

2019 Premiership Rugby Cup Final Starting XV

(vs. Northampton Saints)

== Industry awards ==
=== Rugby Players' Association Awards ===
The following Saracens players have achieved recognition at the annual RPA Awards, voted for by fellow professionals based in England:

RPA Players' Player of the Year
| Year | Winner | Position | Ref |
|---|---|---|---|
| 2007 | (New Zealand) Glen Jackson | Fly-half | |
| 2010 | (South Africa) Schalk Brits | Hooker | |

RPA Young Player of the Year
| Year | Winner | Position | Ref |
|---|---|---|---|
| 2012 | (England) Owen Farrell | Fly-half | |
| 2016 | (England) Maro Itoje | Lock | |

RPA England 15s Player of the Year
| Year | Winner | Position | Ref |
|---|---|---|---|
| 2016 | (England) Billy Vunipola | Number 8 | |
| 2017 | (England) Owen Farrell | Fly-half | |
| 2018 | (England) Mako Vunipola | Prop | |
| 2024 | (England) Ben Earl | Number 8 | |

RPA England 7s Player of the Year
| Year | Winner | Position | Ref |
|---|---|---|---|
| 2020 | (England) Ben Harris | Wing | |

RPA Hall of Fame
| Year | Inductee | Position | Notes |
|---|---|---|---|
| 1999 | (Australia) Michael Lynagh | Fly-half | Saracens player 1996–1998 |
| 2001 | (France) Philippe Sella | Centre | Saracens player 1996–1998 |
| 2003 | (Australia) Tim Horan | Centre | Saracens player 2000–2003 |
| 2008 | (England) Richard Hill | Flanker | Saracens player 1993–2008 |
| 2008 | (England) Jason Leonard | Prop | Saracens player 1989–1990 |

RPA Special Merit Award
| Year | Winner | Position | Ref |
|---|---|---|---|
| 2012 | (England) Hugh Vyvyan | Lock | |
| 2014 | (England) Steve Borthwick | Lock | |
| 2016 | (England) Charlie Hodgson | Fly-half | |
| 2020 | (England) Richard Wigglesworth | Scrum-half | |
| 2023 | (England) Owen Farrell | Fly-half | |

RPA Moment of the Season
| Year | Winner | Position | Moment | Match | Venue | Date | Ref |
|---|---|---|---|---|---|---|---|
| 2024 | (England) Owen Farrell | Fly-half | 250th appearance for Saracens at The Showdown 4 | vs. Harlequins | Tottenham Hotspur Stadium | 23 March 2024 | |

==== RPA 15 Under 23 ====
The following Saracens players aged 23 and under have been recognised by the RPA's 15 Under 23 scheme since it launched in 2021:

RPA 15 Under 23 Player of the Month
| Season | Month | Nominee | Winner | Ref |
|---|---|---|---|---|
| 2021–22 | October | (England) Ben Earl | — | |
| 2021–22 | December | (England) Nick Isiekwe | — | |
| 2021–22 | April | (Scotland) Andy Christie | — | |
| 2022–23 | October | (England) Hugh Tizard | — | |
| 2022–23 | November | (England) Theo Dan | — | |
| 2022–23 | January | (Scotland) Andy Christie (2) | — | |
| 2022–23 | April | (England) Olly Hartley | — | |
| 2023–24 | November | (England) Theo Dan (2) | — | |
| 2023–24 | December | (Argentina) Juan Martín González | — | |
| 2024–25 | September | (England) Tobias Elliott | — | |
| 2024–25 | January | (England) Phil Brantingham | — | |
| 2024–25 | April | (England) Theo Dan (3) | — | |
| 2025–26 | September | (England) Noah Caluori | — | |
| 2025–26 | November | (England) Nathan Michelow | — | |
| 2025–26 | April | (England) Charlie Bracken | (England) Charlie Bracken | |

RPA 15 Under 23 Team of the Season
| Season | Selections | Players | Positions | Ref |
|---|---|---|---|---|
| 2021–22 | 2 | (England) Nick Isiekwe | No. 4 (Lock) | |
| 2021–22 | 2 | (England) Ben Earl | No. 6 (Flanker) | |
| 2022–23 | 2 | (England) Theo Dan | No. 2 (Hooker) | |
| 2022–23 | 2 | (England) Hugh Tizard | No. 5 (Lock) | |
| 2023–24 | 1 | (England) Theo Dan (2) | No. 2 (Hooker) | |
| 2024–25 | 1 | (England) Theo Dan (3) | No. 2 (Hooker) | |
| 2025–26 | 1 | (England) Noah Caluori | No. 11 (Wing) | |

=== Rugby Black List Awards ===
The following Saracens players and coaches have earned recognition at the annual Rugby Black List Awards, which launched in 2023:

Performance Player of the Year
| Year | Nominee | Winner | Ref |
|---|---|---|---|
| 2023 | (England) Maro Itoje | — | |
| 2024 | (Scotland) Andy Christie | — | |

Performance Coach of the Year
| Year | Nominee | Winner | Ref |
|---|---|---|---|
| 2023 | (England) Joe Shaw | — | |
| 2024 | (England) Joe Shaw (2) | (England) Joe Shaw | |

Life in Sport Award
| Year | Winner | Ref |
|---|---|---|
| 2023 | (England) Floyd Steadman | |

=== Rugby Union Writers' Club Awards ===
The following Saracens players have been recognised at the annual Rugby Union Writers' Club Awards:

Personality of the Year
| Year | Nominee | Winner | Ref |
|---|---|---|---|
| 2017 | (England) Owen Farrell | (England) Owen Farrell | |
| 2017 | (England) Maro Itoje | (England) Owen Farrell | |

== Internal club awards ==
=== Player of the Year ===
The following Saracens players have achieved recognition at the club's annual Big Bash end-of-season awards since the 2008–09 season:

=== Before 2015 ===
| Season | Players' Player of the Year | Storm Player of the Year | Most Improved Player | Community Player of the Year | Academy Player of the Year |
|---|---|---|---|---|---|
| 2008–09 | (South Africa) Wikus van Heerden | (England) Alex Goode | Not awarded | (Wales) Michael Owen | Not awarded |
| 2009–10 | (England) Brad Barritt | (England) George Kruis | (Fiji) Michael Tagicakibau | (United States) Hayden Smith | Not awarded |
| 2010–11 | (Namibia) Jacques Burger | (South Africa) Jared Saunders | (England) Owen Farrell | (United States) Hayden Smith (2) | Not awarded |
| 2011–12 | (Wales) Rhys Gill | Not awarded | (England) George Kruis | (England) Will Fraser | (England) Nathan Earle |
| 2012–13 | (England) Steve Borthwick | Not awarded | (England) Will Fraser | Not awarded | (Wales) Nick Tompkins |

=== After 2015 ===
| Season | Players' Player of the Year | Fans' Player of the Year | Young Player of the Year | Community Player of the Year | Academy Player of the Year |
|---|---|---|---|---|---|
| 2015–16 | (Scotland) Duncan Taylor | (England) Owen Farrell | (England) Billy Vunipola | (England) Will Fraser | Not awarded |
| 2016–17 | (South Africa) Michael Rhodes | (Argentina) Marcelo Bosch | (England) Maro Itoje | (England) Chris Ashton | (England) Hayden Stringer |
| 2017–18 | (England) Jackson Wray | (England) Jackson Wray | (England) Nick Isiekwe | Not awarded | (England) Max Malins |
| 2018–19 | (Australia) Will Skelton | (England) Alex Goode | (United States) Titi Lamositele | (England) Calum Clark | (England) Sean Reffell |
| 2019–20 | (England) Richard Wigglesworth | Not awarded | (England) Manu Vunipola | Categories discontinued after 2018–19 season | |
| 2020–21 | (Scotland) Tim Swinson | Not awarded | (England) Sean Reffell | Categories discontinued after 2018–19 season | |
| 2021–22 | (South Africa) Vincent Koch | (England) Ben Earl | (Scotland) Andy Christie | Categories discontinued after 2018–19 season | |
| 2022–23 | (South Africa) Ivan van Zyl | (England) Ben Earl (2) | (England) Hugh Tizard | Categories discontinued after 2018–19 season | |
| 2023–24 | (Argentina) Juan Martín González | (Argentina) Juan Martín González | (England) Theo Dan | Categories discontinued after 2018–19 season | |
| 2024–25 | (England) Tom Willis | (England) Tom Willis | (England) Tobias Elliott | Categories discontinued after 2018–19 season | |
| 2025–26 | (England) Tom Willis | To be determined | (England) Noah Caluori | Categories discontinued after 2018–19 season | |

=== Try of the Season ===
The following players have received the Saracens Try of the Season award, voted for by the club's supporters:

| Season | Competition | Round | Position | Scorer | Opponent | Date | Stadium | Location |
|---|---|---|---|---|---|---|---|---|
| 2015–16 | Champions Cup | 6 | Scrum-half | (England) Ben Spencer | vs. Toulouse | 23 January 2016 | Stadium Municipal | Toulouse |
| 2016–17 | Premiership | 18 | Full-back | (England) Alex Goode | vs. Bath | 26 March 2017 | Allianz Park | Hendon |
| 2017–18 | Premiership | 7 | Wing | (United States) Chris Wyles | vs. London Irish | 28 October 2017 | Allianz Park | Hendon |
| 2018–19 | Premiership | 8 | Wing | (England) Alex Lewington | vs. Leicester | 25 November 2018 | Welford Road Stadium | Leicester |
| 2020–21 | Championship | Final | Wing | (Scotland) Sean Maitland | vs. Ealing | 13 June 2021 | Trailfinders Sports Ground | West Ealing |
| 2021–22 | Premiership | 25 | Flanker | (Samoa) Theo McFarland | vs. Northampton | 21 May 2022 | StoneX Stadium | Hendon |
| 2022–23 | Champions Cup | 3 | Full-back | (England) Elliot Daly | vs. Lyon | 14 January 2023 | StoneX Stadium | Hendon |
| 2023–24 | Premiership | 13 | Wing | (Scotland) Sean Maitland (2) | vs. Harlequins | 23 March 2024 | Tottenham Hotspur Stadium | Tottenham |
| 2024–25 | Premiership | 10 | Number 8 | (England) Tom Willis | vs. Bristol | 4 January 2025 | StoneX Stadium | Hendon |
| 2025–26 | Premiership | 14 | Wing | (England) Noah Caluori | vs. Leicester | 25 April 2026 | StoneX Stadium | Hendon |

=== Player of the Month ===
The following players have been named the Saracens Player of the Month (awarded since 2021):

| | 2020–21 | | 2021–22 | | 2022–23 | |
| Month | Player | Ref | Player | Ref | Player | Ref |
|---|---|---|---|---|---|---|
| October | Not awarded | | (England) Billy Vunipola | | (South Africa) Ivan van Zyl | |
| November | Not awarded | | (Scotland) Andy Christie | | (England) Ben Earl | |
| December | Not awarded | | (England) Nick Isiekwe | | (England) Owen Farrell | |
| January | Not awarded | | (England) Mako Vunipola | | (England) Hugh Tizard | |
| February | Not awarded | | (South Africa) Vincent Koch | | (Scotland) Andy Christie | |
| March | Not awarded | | (Wales) Aled Davies | | (Scotland) Sean Maitland | |
| April | (Wales) Aled Davies | | (Scotland) Sean Maitland | | (England) Jackson Wray | |
| May | (England) Sean Reffell | | (England) Owen Farrell | | Not awarded | |

| | 2023–24 | | 2024–25 | | 2025–26 | |
| Month | Player | Ref | Player | Ref | Player | Ref |
|---|---|---|---|---|---|---|
| September | Not awarded | | (England) Tom Willis | | Not awarded | |
| October | (England) Tom Willis | | (England) Tom Willis (2) | | (England) Tom Willis | |
| November | (Scotland) Andy Christie | | (England) Nathan Michelow | | (England) Harry Wilson | |
| December | (Argentina) Juan Martín González | | (Samoa) Theo McFarland | | (England) Hugh Tizard | |
| January | (England) Rotimi Segun | | (England) Tom Willis (3) | | Not awarded | |
| February | Not awarded | | (England) Tobias Elliott | | Not awarded | |
| March | (England) Elliot Daly | | (England) Maro Itoje | | (England) Tobias Elliott | |
| April | (England) Tom Parton | | (Wales) Nick Tompkins | | (England) Noah Caluori | |
| May | (England) Owen Farrell | | (New Zealand) Fergus Burke | | To be determined | |

== Competitive head-to-head record ==
=== Results per opposition ===
The following table details the past performance of Saracens against different opponents in the English Premiership, between the 1989–90 and 2023–24 seasons.

English Premiership
| Opposition | Span | Played | Won | Drawn | Lost | Win % | Points for | Average PF | Points against | Best score | Worst score | 40–49 points | 50+ points |
|---|---|---|---|---|---|---|---|---|---|---|---|---|---|
| Bath | 1989–2024 | 61 | 35 | 3 | 23 | 57.38% | 1474 | 24.16 | 1305 | 71–17 (2021–22) | 66–21 (2007–08) | 2 | 5 |
| Bristol Bears | 1989–2024 | 38 | 27 | 1 | 10 | 71.05% | 954 | 25.11 | 600 | 47–13 (2019–20) | 45–22 (1999–00) | 4 | 0 |
| Harlequins | 1989–2024 | 60 | 40 | 1 | 19 | 66.67% | 1491 | 24.85 | 1215 | 52–7 (2023–24) | 43–6 (2001–02) | 2 | 2 |
| Birmingham Moseley | 1989–1990 | 2 | 2 | 0 | 0 | 100.00% | 54 | 27.00 | 19 | 33–13 (1989–90) | 13–33 (1989–90) | 0 | 0 |
| Orrell | 1989–1997 | 8 | 5 | 0 | 3 | 62.50% | 130 | 16.25 | 134 | 44–22 (1996–97) | 38–13 (1995–96) | 1 | 0 |
| Bedford Blues | 1989–2000 | 5 | 5 | 0 | 0 | 100.00% | 187 | 37.40 | 80 | 57–29 (1999–00) | 29–57 (1999–00) | 1 | 1 |
| Gloucester | 1989–2024 | 63 | 30 | 3 | 30 | 47.62% | 1438 | 22.83 | 1476 | 62–12 (2017–18) | 50–9 (2006–07) | 6 | 2 |
| Leicester Tigers | 1989–2024 | 65 | 28 | 4 | 33 | 43.08% | 1348 | 20.74 | 1425 | 51–18 (2022–23) | 48–7 (2001–02) | 2 | 2 |
| Nottingham | 1989–1992 | 3 | 2 | 0 | 1 | 66.67% | 53 | 17.67 | 40 | 28–3 (1990–91) | 25–12 (1989–90) | 0 | 0 |
| Rosslyn Park | 1989–1992 | 3 | 3 | 0 | 0 | 100.00% | 38 | 12.67 | 30 | 15–13 (1989–90) | 13–15 (1989–90) | 0 | 0 |
| Wasps | 1989–2022 | 57 | 26 | 1 | 30 | 45.61% | 1200 | 21.05 | 1379 | 57–33 (2017–18) | 64–23 (2015–16) | 0 | 2 |
| Liverpool St Helens | 1990–1991 | 1 | 1 | 0 | 0 | 100.00% | 17 | 17.00 | 3 | 17–3 (1990–91) | 3–17 (1990–91) | 0 | 0 |
| Northampton Saints | 1990–2024 | 61 | 37 | 0 | 24 | 60.66% | 1507 | 24.88 | 1339 | 63–13 (2017–18) | 58–17 (2005–06) | 3 | 2 |
| London Irish | 1991–2023 | 50 | 29 | 1 | 19 | 60.42% | 1246 | 25.96 | 1021 | 51–14 (2017–18) | 55–13 (2001–02) | 8 | 1 |
| Rugby Lions | 1991–1993 | 2 | 2 | 0 | 0 | 100.00% | 36 | 18.00 | 15 | 22–6 (1991–92) | 9–14 (1992–93) | 0 | 0 |
| West Hartlepool | 1992–1999 | 7 | 6 | 0 | 1 | 85.71% | 249 | 35.57 | 127 | 52–3 (1998–99) | 31–41 (1995–96) | 2 | 2 |
| London Scottish | 1992–1999 | 3 | 2 | 0 | 1 | 66.67% | 106 | 35.33 | 61 | 58–20 (1998–99) | 24–7 (1998–99) | 1 | 1 |
| Sale Sharks | 1995–2024 | 57 | 36 | 2 | 19 | 63.16% | 1529 | 27.25 | 1160 | 58–12 (1999–00) | 40–32 (2005–06) | 7 | 3 |
| Richmond | 1997–1999 | 4 | 4 | 0 | 0 | 100.00% | 88 | 22.00 | 54 | 33–17 (1998–99) | 18–25 (1998–99) | 0 | 0 |
| Newcastle Falcons | 1997–2023 | 48 | 35 | 1 | 12 | 72.92% | 1298 | 27.04 | 851 | 58–15 (2009–10) | 47–18 (2001–02) | 4 | 3 |
| Rotherham Titans | 2000–2004 | 4 | 3 | 0 | 1 | 75.00% | 121 | 30.25 | 46 | 55–30 (2000–01) | 19–8 (2000–01) | 0 | 1 |
| Yorkshire Carnegie | 2001–2011 | 16 | 10 | 0 | 6 | 62.50% | 399 | 24.94 | 266 | 66–7 (2007–08) | 41–31 (2003–04) | 0 | 1 |
| Worcester Warriors | 2004–2022 | 30 | 20 | 1 | 9 | 66.67% | 826 | 27.53 | 507 | 62–5 (2019–20) | 40–27 (2019–20) | 5 | 2 |
| Exeter Chiefs | 2010–2024 | 30 | 18 | 1 | 11 | 60.00% | 713 | 23.68 | 565 | 40–17 (2019–20) | 65–10 (2023–24) | 3 | 0 |
| London Welsh | 2012–2015 | 4 | 4 | 0 | 0 | 100.00% | 209 | 52.25 | 61 | 78–7 (2014–15) | 23–28 (2012–13) | 0 | 2 |
| Overall | 1989–2024 | 682 | 410 | 19 | 253 | 60.12% | 16711 | 24.50 | 13779 | 78–7 vs London Welsh (2014–15) | 66–21 vs Bath (2007–08) | 51 | 32 |

- Data include all regular season and play-off matches (semi-finals and finals).
- All fixtures added from 1989–90 to 2023–24

=== Best and worst results ===
The following records denote the club's best and worst results (by margin) in both domestic and European competition:

==== Premiership Rugby ====
- Biggest home win – 71-point margin
  - Saracens 78–7 London Welsh (20 December 2014)
- Biggest away win – 66-point margin
  - Sale 19–85 Saracens (19 April 2026)
- Most points scored – 85 points
  - Sale 19–85 Saracens (19 April 2026)
- Biggest home loss – 41-point margin
  - Saracens 23–64 Wasps (14 February 2016)
- Biggest away loss – 58-point margin
  - Bath 68–10 Saracens (28 December 2024)
- Most points conceded – 68 points
  - Bath 68–10 Saracens (28 December 2024)

==== European Champions Cup ====
- Biggest home win – 64-point margin
  - (England) Saracens 71–7 Viadana (Italy) (8 December 2007)
- Biggest away win – 45-point margin
  - (Scotland) Edinburgh 0–45 Saracens (England) (13 October 2012)
- Most points scored – 71 points
  - (England) Saracens 71–7 Viadana (Italy) (8 December 2007)
- Biggest home loss – 32-point margin
  - (England) Saracens 14–46 Clermont (France) (11 December 2017)
- Biggest away loss – 40-point margin
  - (France) Bordeaux 55–15 Saracens (England) (14 January 2024)
- Most points conceded – 72 points
  - (France) Toulon 72–42 Saracens (England) (5 April 2025)

==== European Challenge Cup ====
- Biggest home win – 151-point margin
  - (England) Saracens 151–0 Dinamo București (Romania) (20 October 2002)
- Biggest away win – 76-point margin
  - (Romania) Dinamo București 11–87 Saracens (England) (12 October 2002)
- Most points scored – 151 points
  - (England) Saracens 151–0 Dinamo București (Romania) (20 October 2002)
- Biggest home loss – 3-point margin
  - (England) Saracens 18–21 Edinburgh (Scotland) (11 December 2021)
- Biggest away loss – 28-point margin
  - (Scotland) Glasgow Warriors 33–5 Saracens (England) (16 January 2004)
- Most points conceded – 33 points
  - (Scotland) Glasgow Warriors 33–5 Saracens (England) (16 January 2004)

== See also ==
- Saracens F.C.
- List of Saracens F.C. players selected for international rugby
