= 2014–15 LV Cup =

Tournament details
- Countries: England; Wales
- Tournament format(s): Round-robin and knockout
- Date: 1 November 2014 – 22 March 2015

Tournament statistics
- Teams: 16

Final
- Venue: Franklin's Gardens, Northampton
- Attendance: 8,685
- Champions: Saracens (2nd title)
- Runners-up: Exeter Chiefs

The 2014–15 LV Cup (styled as the LV= Cup) is the 44th season of England's national rugby union cup competition, and the tenth to follow the Anglo-Welsh format.

The competition consists of the four Welsh Pro12 teams and the twelve English Premiership clubs arranged into pools consisting of three English and one Welsh team. English clubs have been allocated to the pools depending on their finish in the 2013–14 Aviva Premiership. Teams are guaranteed two home and two away pool matches, with teams in Pools 1 and 4 playing each other and teams in Pools 2 and 3 playing each other. The top team from each pool qualifies for the semi-finals. The competition will take place during the Autumn Internationals window and during the Six Nations thus allowing teams to develop their squad players.

Exeter Chiefs were the defending champions this season after claiming the cup with a 15–8 victory over Northampton Saints in the final at Sandy Park in Exeter. The final was won by Saracens 23–20 over Exeter Chiefs with a last-minute penalty from Ben Spencer securing the Londoners' second title in the competition.

== Pool stages ==
Points system

The points scoring system for the pool stages will be as follows:

- 4 points for a win
- 2 points for a draw
- 1 bonus point for scoring four or more tries in a match (TB)
- 1 bonus point for a loss by seven points or less (LB)

=== Pool 1 v Pool 4 ===
Pool 1
| Team | P | W | D | L | PF | PA | PD | TF | TA | TB | LB | Pts |
| (England) Saracens (2) | 4 | 4 | 0 | 0 | 101 | 62 | +39 | 10 | 6 | 1 | 0 | 17 |
| (England) Gloucester | 4 | 3 | 0 | 1 | 102 | 69 | +33 | 10 | 7 | 1 | 1 | 14 |
| (Wales) Newport Gwent Dragons | 4 | 2 | 0 | 2 | 121 | 116 | +5 | 14 | 14 | 2 | 1 | 11 |
| (England) Bath | 4 | 2 | 0 | 2 | 86 | 59 | +27 | 11 | 6 | 2 | 1 | 11 |
Updated 8 February 2015; Source: Premiership Rugby

Pool 4
| Team | P | W | D | L | PF | PA | PD | TF | TA | TB | LB | Pts |
| (England) Exeter Chiefs (4) | 4 | 3 | 0 | 1 | 101 | 100 | +1 | 12 | 12 | 1 | 0 | 13 |
| (Wales) Ospreys | 4 | 1 | 0 | 3 | 82 | 114 | −32 | 9 | 12 | 1 | 1 | 6 |
| (England) Harlequins | 4 | 1 | 0 | 3 | 79 | 94 | −15 | 8 | 10 | 0 | 2 | 6 |
| (England) London Welsh | 4 | 0 | 0 | 4 | 44 | 102 | −58 | 4 | 11 | 0 | 2 | 2 |
Updated 8 February 2015; Source: Premiership Rugby

==== Round 1 ====
1 November 2014
15:00

| (BP) Bath (England) | 47–7 | (England) London Welsh |
| Try: Northcote-Green (2) 4' m, 51' c Woodburn 24' c Penalty try 38' c Banahan 40' m Lane 75' m Garratt 80' m Con: Henson (3/7); Pen: Henson (2/2) 11', 32' | Report | Try: Scott 60' c Con: Robinson (1/1) |

Recreation Ground
Attendance: 13,300

1 November 2014
15:00

| (BP) Exeter Chiefs (England) | 28–27 | (England) Gloucester (BP) |
| Try: Hughes 40' c Vainikolo 55' m Penalty try 78' c Con: Sweeney (2/3); Pen: Sweeney (3/3) 8', 41', 64' | Report | Try: Evans 34' c Meakes 42' c Thomas 61' c Con: Thomas (3/3); Pen: Thomas (2/2) 7', 47' |

Sandy Park
Attendance: 13,300
Referee: Simon Harding (RFU)

2 November 2014
13:00

| Saracens (England) | 25–20 | (England) Harlequins (BP) |
| Try: Taylor 25' c Ellery 28' m Wilson 59' c Con: Spencer (2/3); Pen: Spencer (2/2) 3', 70' | Report | Try: Lambert 57' c Walker 63' c Con: Swiel (2/2); Pen: Grimoldby (1/1) 33'; Swiel (1/1) 75' |

Allianz Park
Attendance: 7,012
Referee: Leighton Hodges (Wales)

17 November 2014
19:35

| (BP) Ospreys (Wales) | 35–51 | (Wales) Newport Gwent Dragons (BP) |
| Try: Dirksen 49' c Howells 52' c Griffiths 56' c Penalty try 66' c Natoga 71' c Con: Davies (5/5) | Report | Try: Wardle 8' c L. Evans 11' c J. Evans (2) 16' c, 40+1' c Hill (2) 30' c, 46' c Con: R. Jones (6/6); Pen: R. Jones (2/2) 6', 26' |

Brewery Field
Attendance: 2,736

=== Pool 2 v Pool 3 ===
Pool 2
| Team | P | W | D | L | PF | PA | PD | TF | TA | TB | LB | Pts |
| (England) Northampton Saints (3) | 4 | 3 | 0 | 1 | 98 | 53 | +45 | 13 | 5 | 2 | 0 | 14 |
| (Wales) Cardiff Blues | 4 | 3 | 0 | 1 | 95 | 119 | −24 | 10 | 16 | 1 | 0 | 13 |
| (England) Sale Sharks | 4 | 2 | 0 | 2 | 102 | 100 | +2 | 12 | 13 | 2 | 0 | 10 |
| (England) London Irish | 4 | 0 | 0 | 4 | 69 | 118 | −49 | 5 | 14 | 0 | 1 | 1 |
Updated 8 February 2015; Source: Premiership Rugby

Pool 3
| Team | P | W | D | L | PF | PA | PD | TF | TA | TB | LB | Pts |
| (England) Leicester Tigers (1) | 4 | 4 | 0 | 0 | 106 | 46 | +60 | 14 | 3 | 2 | 0 | 18 |
| (England) Newcastle Falcons | 4 | 2 | 0 | 2 | 114 | 91 | +23 | 15 | 10 | 2 | 1 | 11 |
| (England) Wasps | 4 | 1 | 0 | 3 | 120 | 128 | −8 | 14 | 15 | 3 | 2 | 9 |
| (Wales) Scarlets | 4 | 1 | 0 | 3 | 50 | 99 | −49 | 5 | 12 | 0 | 1 | 5 |
Updated 8 February 2015; Source: Premiership Rugby

== Semi finals ==
| Team One | Team Two | Score |
|---|---|---|
| Saracens | Northampton Saints | 24–20 |
| Leicester Tigers | Exeter Chiefs | 22–30 |

== Final ==
22 March 2015

| Saracens (England) | 23–20 | (England) Exeter Chiefs |
| Try: David Strettle (2); Nick de Jager; Con: Ben Spencer; Pen: Ben Spencer (2) | | Try: Max Bodilly (2); Con: Gareth Steenson 2 Pen: Ceri Sweeney 2 |

Franklin's Gardens, Northampton
Attendance: 8,365
Referee: Ian Davies (Wales)

| FB | 15 | (England) Ben Ransom |
| RW | 14 | (England) Mike Ellery |
| OC | 13 | (Argentina) Marcelo Bosch |
| IC | 12 | (England) Tim Streather |
| LW | 11 | (England) David Strettle |
| FH | 10 | (England) Nils Mordt |
| SH | 9 | (England) Ben Spencer |
| N8 | 8 | (South Africa) Ernst Joubert |
| OF | 7 | (England) Matt Hankin |
| BF | 6 | (South Africa) Nick de Jager |
| RL | 5 | (United States) Hayden Smith |
| LL | 4 | (England) Maro Itoje (c) |
| TP | 3 | (Argentina) Juan Figallo |
| HK | 2 | (South Africa) Jared Saunders |
| LP | 1 | (England) Richard Barrington |
Replacements:
| HK | 16 | (England) Scott Spurling |
| PR | 17 | (United States) Titi Lamositele |
| PR | 18 | (England) Biyi Alo |
| LK | 19 | (England) George Kruis |
| FL | 20 | (Scotland) Kelly Brown |
| SH | 21 | (England) Tom Whiteley |
| FH | 22 | (England) Alex Goode |
| FB | 23 | (Romania) Cătălin Fercu |
Coach:
(Ireland) Mark McCall

| FB | 15 | (England) Max Bodilly |
| RW | 14 | (Tonga) Fet'u Vainikolo |
| OC | 13 | (Wales) Adam Hughes |
| IC | 12 | (Fiji) Sireli Naqelevuki |
| LW | 11 | (Wales) Tom James |
| FH | 10 | (Wales) Ceri Sweeney (c) |
| SH | 9 | (England) Haydn Thomas |
| N8 | 8 | (England) Kai Horstmann |
| OF | 7 | (England) Sam Simmonds |
| BF | 6 | (Australia) Ben White |
| RL | 5 | (Ireland) Jerry Sexton |
| LL | 4 | (Australia) Mitch Lees |
| TP | 3 | (Scotland) Moray Low |
| HK | 2 | (Tonga) Elvis Taione |
| LP | 1 | (England) Brett Sturgess |
Replacements:
| HK | 16 | (England) Greg Bateman |
| PR | 17 | (England) Carl Rimmer |
| PR | 18 | (England) Alex Brown |
| LK | 19 | (England) Ed Holmes |
| FL | 20 | (England) Joel Conlon |
| SH | 21 | (England) Dave Lewis |
| FH | 22 | (Ireland) Gareth Steenson |
| CE | 23 | (Scotland) Byron McGuigan |
Coach:
(England) Rob Baxter
