= 2002–03 European Challenge Cup =

7th Season of international club rugby union competition

2002-03 European Challenge Cup

Tournament details
- Countries: England; France; Ireland; Italy; Romania; Scotland; Spain; Wales
- Tournament format(s): Knockout
- Date: 11 October 2002 - 25 May 2003

Tournament statistics
- Teams: 32
- Matches played: 61
- Attendance: 225,733 (3,701 per match)
- Tries scored: 384 (6.3 per match)
- Top point scorer(s): Olly Barkley (Bath) (118 points)
- Top try scorer(s): Tom Shanklin (Saracens) (8 tries)

Final
- Venue: Madejski Stadium, Reading
- Attendance: 18,074
- Champions: (England) London Wasps (1st title)
- Runners-up: (England) Bath Rugby

The 2002–03 European Challenge Cup (known as the Parker Pen Challenge Cup for sponsorship reasons) was the 7th season of the European Challenge Cup, Europe's second-tier club rugby union competition below the Heineken Cup. A total of 32 teams participated, representing eight countries.

The competition began with Gran Parma hosting Bath and Ebbw Vale hosting Montauban on 11 October 2002. It culminated with the final at the Madejski Stadium in Reading on 25 May 2003.

Unlike previous seasons, the structure of the competition was changed to a purely knockout format. Teams played each other on a home and away basis, with the aggregate points winner proceeding to the next round. The final was a single leg. For that first time, a third tier tournament was created - the European Shield. This was contested between the first-round losers from the European Challenge Cup.

The defending champions, England's Sale Sharks, did not have a chance to defend their crown because they qualified to play in the Heineken Cup. London Wasps claimed a victory over Bath in the final and picked up their first piece of European Club silverware.

== Teams ==
The allocation of teams was as follows:

England: 6 teams – all teams from the Zurich Premiership that did not qualify for the 2002–03 Heineken Cup
France: 9 teams – all teams from the Top 16 that did not qualify for the Heineken Cup, and Agen who were banned by ERC
Ireland: 1 team – the Irish team from the Celtic League that did not play in the Heineken Cup
Italy: 8 teams – all the teams from the Super 10 that did not qualify for the Heineken Cup
Romania: 1 team specially created for the competition
Scotland: 1 team – the Scottish team from the Celtic League that did not play in the Heineken Cup
Spain: 2 teams – drawn from the División de Honor de Rugby
Wales: 4 teams – all the teams from the Celtic League that did not qualify for the Heineken Cup

England	France	Ireland	Italy	Romania	Scotland	Spain	Wales
Bath Harlequins Leeds Tykes London Wasps Newcastle Falcons Saracens	Bordeaux-Bègles Castres Olympique Colomiers Grenoble Montauban Mont de Marsan Narbonne Pau Stade Français	Connacht	Gran Parma L'Aquila Overmach Parma Petrarca Padova Rugby Roma Rovigo Rugby Silea Benetton Treviso	Dinamo București	Borders	La Moraleja UC Madrid	Bridgend Caerphilly Ebbw Vale Pontypridd

== Matches ==
All kickoff times are local to the match location.

=== Round 1 ===
Team 1	Agg.	Team 2	1st leg	2nd leg
Saracens (England)	238–11	(Romania) Dinamo București	87–11	151–0
Stade Français (France)	145–26	(Italy) Rovigo		
Pontypridd (Wales)	143–26	(Italy) Rugby Roma		
Colomiers (France)	133–19	(Italy) L'Aquila		
Borders (Scotland)	150–37	(Spain) UC Madrid		
Bath (England)	97–22	(Italy) Gran Parma		
London Wasps (England)	82–24	(Italy) Overmach Parma		
Harlequins (England)	104–47	(Wales) Caerphilly		
Leeds Tykes (England)	81–36	(Italy) Petrarca Padova		
Narbonne (France)	75–37	(Italy) Rugby Silea		
Connacht (Ireland)	73–41	(France) Mont de Marsan		
Benetton Treviso (Italy)	55–26	(France) Castres		
Bordeaux-Bègles (France)	70–46	(Spain) La Moraleja		
Newcastle Falcons (England)	52–29	(France) Grenoble		
Montauban (France)	45–36	(Wales) Ebbw Vale		
Bridgend (Wales)	33–27	(France) Pau		

==== First leg ====
11 October 2002
19:00

Gran Parma (Italy)	3–40	(England) Bath
	Report

Stadio Sergio Lanfranchi
Attendance: 1,200

11 October 2002
19:15

Ebbw Vale (Wales)	20–16	(France) Montauban
	Report

Eugene Cross Park
Attendance: 1,500

12 October 2002
14:30

Caerphilly (Wales)	20–73	(England) Harlequins
	Report

Virginia Park
Attendance: 1,500

12 October 2002
14:30

Dinamo București (Romania)	11–87	(England) Saracens
	Report

Complexul Cultural Sportiv
Attendance: 400

12 October 2002
14:30

Rugby Roma (Italy)	18–60	(Wales) Pontypridd
	Report

Stadio Tre Fontane
Attendance: 400

12 October 2002
15:00

Benetton Treviso (Italy)	22–9	(France) Castres Olympique
	Report

Stadio Comunale di Monigo
Attendance: 3,000

12 October 2002
15:00

L'Aquila (Italy)	14–58	(France) Colomiers
	Report

Stadio Tommaso Fattori
Attendance: 500

12 October 2002
15:00

Petrarca Padova (Italy)	23–29	(England) Leeds Tykes
	Report

Stadio Plebiscito
Attendance: 2,000

12 October 2002
16:00

UC Madrid (Spain)	22–73	(Scotland) Borders
	Report

Ciudad Universitaria
Attendance: 1,000

12 October 2002
18:00

La Moraleja (Spain)	31–37	(France) Bordeaux-Bègles
	Report

Pol. Municipal de Alcobendas
Attendance: 550

12 October 2002
19:00

Overmach Parma (Italy)	24–40	(England) London Wasps
	Report

Stadio Sergio Lanfranchi
Attendance: 1,500

12 October 2002
19:30

Grenoble (France)	12–19	(England) Newcastle Falcons
	Report

Stade Lesdiguières
Attendance: 4,500

12 October 2002
19:30

Mont de Marsan (France)	12–26	(Ireland) Connacht
	Report

Stade Guy Boniface
Attendance: 1,204

12 October 2002
19:30

Pau (France)	18–6	(Wales) Bridgend
	Report

Stade du Hameau
Attendance: 5,000

13 October 2002
15:00

Rovigo (Italy)	6–64	(France) Stade Français
	Report

Stadio Comunale Mario Battaglini
Attendance: 1,500

13 October 2002
15:00

Rugby Silea (Italy)	23–34	(France) Narbonne
	Report

Stadio Comunale di Monigo
Attendance: 400

==== Second leg ====
18 October 2002
19:30

Borders (Scotland)	77–15	(Spain) UC Madrid
	Report

Netherdale
Attendance: 7,840

19 October 2002
14:15

Bath (England)	57–19	(Italy) Gran Parma
	Report

The Recreation Ground
Attendance: 7,840

19 October 2002
14:30

Pontypridd (Wales)	83–8	(Italy) Rugby Roma
	Report

Sardis Road
Attendance: 2,000

19 October 2002
15:00

Connacht (Ireland)	47–29	(France) Mont de Marsan
	Report

The Sportsground
Attendance: 1,000

19 October 2002
15:00

Harlequins (England)	31–27	(Wales) Caerphilly
	Report

The Stoop
Attendance: 4,250

19 October 2002
17:30

Bridgend (Wales)	27–9	(France) Pau
	Report

Brewery Field
Attendance: 2,500

19 October 2002
18:00

Bordeaux-Bègles (France)	33–15	(Spain) La Moraleja
	Report

Stade André Moga
Attendance: 2,000

19 October 2002
18:00

Stade Français (France)	81–20	(Italy) Rovigo
	Report

Stade Jean-Bouin
Attendance: 3,000

19 October 2002
19:30

Castres Olympique (France)	17–33	(Italy) Benetton Treviso
	Report

Stade Pierre-Antoine

19 October 2002
19:30

Colomiers (France)	75–5	(Italy) L'Aquila
	Report

Stade Selery
Attendance: 2,500

19 October 2002
19:30

Montauban (France)	29–16	(Wales) Ebbw Vale
	Report

Stade Sapiac
Attendance: 2,800

19 October 2002
19:30

Narbonne (France)	41–14	(Italy) Rugby Silea
	Report

Parc des Sports et de l'Amitié
Attendance: 2,300

20 October 2002
14:30

Leeds Tykes (England)	52–13	(Italy) Petrarca Padova
	Report

Headingley Stadium
Attendance: 2,665

20 October 2002
14:30

Newcastle Falcons (England)	33–17	(France) Grenoble
	Report

Kingston Park
Attendance: 3,599

20 October 2002
15:00

London Wasps (England)	42–0	(Italy) Overmach Parma
	Report

Adams Park
Attendance: 3,980

20 October 2002
15:00

Saracens (England)	151–0	(Romania) Dinamo București
	Report

Vicarage Road
Attendance: 2,052

=== Round 2 ===
Team 1	Agg.	Team 2	1st leg	2nd leg
London Wasps (England)	72–29	(France) Bordeaux-Bègles		
Stade Français (France)	55–12	(England) Harlequins		
Saracens (England)	46–25	(France) Colomiers		
Montauban (France)	31–22	(Scotland) Borders		
Pontypridd (Wales)	56–42	(England) Leeds Tykes		
Bath (England)	64–38	(Wales) Bridgend		
Newcastle Falcons (England)	43–32	(Italy) Benetton Treviso		
Connacht (Ireland)	50–49	(France) Narbonne		

==== First leg ====
6 December 2002
19:30

Bridgend (Wales)	28–26	(England) Bath
	Report

Brewery Field
Attendance: 3,500

7 December 2002
14:30

Benetton Treviso (Italy)	27–8	(England) Newcastle Falcons
	Report

Stadio Comunale di Monigo
Attendance: 3,500

7 December 2002
15:00

Harlequins (England)	0–26	(France) Stade Français
	Report

The Stoop
Attendance: 5,323

7 December 2002
17:30

Pontypridd (Wales)	37–23	(England) Leeds Tykes
	Report

Sardis Road
Attendance: 4,500

7 December 2002
19:30

Montauban (France)	19–16	(Scotland) Borders
	Report

Stade Sapiac
Attendance: 3,000

7 December 2002
19:30

Narbonne (France)	42–27	(Ireland) Connacht
	Report

Parc des Sports et de l'Amitié
Attendance: 2,000

8 December 2002
15:00

London Wasps (England)	43–6	(France) Bordeaux-Bègles
	Report

Adams Park
Attendance: 3,217

8 December 2002
15:00

Saracens (England)	16–6	(France) Colomiers
	Report

Vicarage Road
Attendance: 3,561

==== Second leg ====
13 December 2002
19:30

Borders (Scotland)	6–12	(France) Montauban
	Report

Netherdale
Attendance: 1,700

14 December 2002
14:15

Bath (England)	38–10	(Wales) Bridgend
	Report

The Recreation Ground
Attendance: 7,063

14 December 2002
14:30

Leeds Tykes (England)	19–19	(Wales) Pontypridd
	Report

Headingley Stadium
Attendance: 2,062

14 December 2002
18:00

Bordeaux-Bègles (France)	23–29	(England) London Wasps
	Report

Stade André Moga
Attendance: 1,500

14 December 2002
18:00

Stade Français (France)	29–12	(England) Harlequins
	Report

Stade Jean-Bouin
Attendance: 7,500

14 December 2002
19:30

Colomiers (France)	19–30	(England) Saracens
	Report

Stade Selery
Attendance: 7,000

15 December 2002
14:30

Newcastle Falcons (England)	35–5	(Italy) Benetton Treviso
	Report

Kingston Park
Attendance: 2,539

15 December 2002
15:00

Connacht (Ireland)	23–7	(France) Narbonne
	Report

Galway Sportsgrounds
Attendance: 2,000

=== Quarter-finals ===
Team 1	Agg.	Team 2	1st leg	2nd leg
London Wasps (England)	62–34	(France) Stade Français	35–22	27–12
Pontypridd (Wales)	47–39	(Ireland) Connacht	35–30	12–9
Saracens (England)	60–41	(England) Newcastle Falcons	31–10	29–31
Bath (England)	48–45	(France) Montauban	24–27	24–18

==== First leg ====
11 January 2003
17:30

Connacht (Ireland)	30–35	(Wales) Pontypridd
	Report

Dubarry Park, Athlone
Attendance: 6,000

11 January 2003
19:30

Montauban (France)	27–24	(England) Bath
	Report

Stade Sapiac, Montauban
Attendance: 6,000

12 January 2003
13:45

London Wasps (England)	35–22	(France) Stade Français
	Report

Adams Park, High Wycombe
Attendance: 5,269

12 January 2003
15:00

Saracens (England)	31–10	(England) Newcastle Falcons
	Report

Vicarage Road, Watford
Attendance: 3,857

==== Second leg ====
18 January 2003
14:15

Bath (England)	24–18	(France) Montauban
	Report

Recreation Ground, Bath
Attendance: 6,200

18 January 2003
17:30

Pontypridd (Wales)	12–9	(Ireland) Connacht
	Report

Sardis Road, Pontypridd
Attendance: 6,000

18 January 2003
18:00

Stade Français (France)	12–27	(England) London Wasps
	Report

Stade Jean-Bouin, Paris
Attendance: 6,491

19 January 2003
14:30

Newcastle Falcons (England)	31–29	(England) Saracens
	Report

Kingston Park, Newcastle upon Tyne
Attendance: 2,439

=== Semi-finals ===
Team 1	Agg.	Team 2	1st leg	2nd leg
London Wasps (England)	61–36	(Wales) Pontypridd	34–19	27–17
Bath (England)	57–57 (Note: Bath went through on superior try count (6–5).)	(England) Saracens	30–38	27–19

==== First leg ====
12 April 2003
17:30

London Wasps (England)	34–19	(Wales) Pontypridd
	Report

Adams Park, High Wycombe
Attendance: 7,776

13 April 2003
15:00

Saracens (England)	38–30	(England) Bath
	Report

Vicarage Road, Watford
Attendance: 6,482

==== Second leg ====
25 April 2003
19:05

Pontypridd (Wales)	17–27	(England) London Wasps
	Report

Sardis Road, Pontypridd
Attendance: 6,500

26 April 2003
14:15

Bath (England)	27–19	(England) Saracens
	Report

Recreation Ground, Bath
Attendance: 8,200

=== Final ===
25 May 2003
15:45

Bath (England)	30–48	(England) London Wasps
Try: Balshaw; Barkley; Tindall; Scaysbrook; Con: Balshaw (1); Barkley (1); Pen: Barkley (2)	Report	Try: Lewsey; Waters; Wood; Greening; Logan; Leota; Con: King (6); Pen: King (2)

Madejski Stadium, Reading
Attendance: 18,074
Referee: Nigel Williams (Wales)

== See also ==
- 2002-03 Heineken Cup
- European Challenge Cup
- 2002–03 European Shield
