= James Scaysbrook =

English rugby union player

- Born: 1 January 1982 (age 44) Birmingham, West Midlands, England
- Height: 1.88 m (6 ft 2 in)
- Weight: 107 kg (16 st 12 lb)

Rugby union career
- Position: Flanker
- Current team: Exeter Chiefs
Senior career
Years	Team	Apps	(Points)
2001–2009	Bath Rugby	172	(45)
2009–	Exeter Chiefs		
International career
Years	Team	Apps	(Points)
- England Saxons
Coaching career
- Years: Team
- 2019–2020: Plymouth Albion

James Scaysbrook (born 1 January 1982) is a retired English rugby union player who played for Exeter Chiefs. He is now the defence coach for Coventry RFC.

== Career ==
Scaysbrook joined Exeter Chiefs from Bath Rugby in 2009. While at Bath Rugby Scaysbrook was called up to the England Saxons squad in February 2007 for their Six Nations games against Italy and Ireland.

After returning to the Aviva Premiership with Exeter in 2010/11 season, Scaysbrook was nominated for the 2011/12 Aviva Premiership Player of the season.

Appointed as head coach of Plymouth Albion R.F.C. on 11 December 2019.
