= Noah Caluori =

English rugby union player

- Caluori in 2026
- Born: 22 September 2006 (age 20) Lewisham, London, England
- Height: 1.94 m (6 ft 4 in)
- Weight: 100 kg (220 lb)

Rugby union career
- Position: Wing
- Current team: Saracens
Senior career
Years	Team	Apps	(Points)
2025–	Saracens	15	(100)
2025–2026	→Ampthill	2	(15)
- Correct as of 27 April 2026
International career
Years	Team	Apps	(Points)
2024	England U18	3	(10)
2025	England U19	2	(15)
2025–2026	England U20	7	(0)
2025	England A	2	(5)
2026–	England	2	(5)
- Correct as of 18 July 2026

Noah Caluori (born 22 September 2006) is an English professional rugby union footballer who plays as a wing for PREM Rugby club Saracens and the England national team.

== Early life ==
Caluori has a Swiss father, Andreas, and a Nigerian mother, Grace. He was educated at St Dunstan's College and Mill Hill School, where he played basketball as well as rugby union. He played rugby union at Blackheath Rugby Club where his teammates included Olamide Sodeke.

== Club career ==
Caluori came through as a member of the rugby academy at Saracens. He made a try-scoring debut in the Prem for Saracens as a nineteen year-old on 26 September 2025, in a 37–19 away victory against Newcastle Red Bulls. He made his first start in the Premiership three weeks later on 18 October against Sale Sharks, scoring five tries in a 65–14 home win. He was denied a sixth try by contact as he jumped to claim a high kick over the try-line, an infringement for which Saracens were awarded a penalty try. In December 2025, he scored a try on his Champions Cup debut in a 47–10 victory against Clermont Auvergne. The following month, he scored four tries in a 73–14 home league win over Newcastle Red Bulls. He also played on loan in the 2025-26 season with Champ Rugby club Ampthill. In April 2026, despite the name on the back of his jersey being spelt incorrectly as 'Calouri', he scored five tries again against Sale Sharks during an 85–19 away victory. Caluori was nominated for Gallagher Prem Player of the Month in April 2026. At the end of that season he was named Prem breakthrough player of the year having been joint leading try scorer along with 18, alongside Tommy Freeman.

Caluori made his first competitive appearance of the 2026-27 season in a 30-7 win against Bristol Bears, opening the scoring with a try in the fourth minute.

== International career ==
Caluori made his debut for the England U18 side in August 2024 against Ireland U18. He received media attention for a solo try scored against South Africa U18 from inside his own 22 metres line later that month. He featured for England U19 in March 2025. In June 2025, he was a member of the England U20 squad at the 2025 World Rugby U20 Championship.

Initially called up to the senior side in a developmental role, Caluori was named in the England 36-man squad for the 2025 Autumn Nations Series on 26 October 2025. He was selected for the England A squad in November 2025. The following week, he scored his first try for England A in a 29–25 victory against Spain. After an injury sustained by Tom Roebuck, he was called back into the senior training squad for the final Autumn Nations Series fixture against Argentina.

Caluori was included in the senior England squad for the inaugural 2026 Nations Championship. On 11 July 2026 he made a try-scoring England debut from the bench in a 73-8 win against Fiji at Hill Dickinson Stadium.

== Career statistics ==
=== List of international tries ===
as of 11 July 2026

No.	Date	Venue	Opponent	Score	Result	Competition	Ref.
1	11 July 2026	Hill Dickinson Stadium, Liverpool, England	Fiji	59–8	73–8	2026 Nations Championship	
