= Rodd Penney =

- Born: 22 July 1978 (age 48) Auckland, New Zealand
- Height: 1.83 m (6 ft 0 in)
- Weight: 96 kg (15 st 2 lb)

Rugby union career
- Position(s): Centre; Wing
Senior career
Years	Team	Apps	(Points)
2001-2002	North Harbour	18	(15)
2003-2004	Orrell R.U.F.C.	32	(45)
2004	England Sevens	2	
2005-2006	London Irish	19	(20)
2006-2010	Saracens	102	(125)
2010	Aironi	13	
2010-2011	Saracens	102	(125)

Rodd Penney (born 22 July 1978) is a former New Zealand rugby union player.

== Rugby playing career ==
Penney's career started in New Zealand where he played two seasons for North Harbour in the National Provincial Championship between 2001 and 2002.

With the ability to play anywhere in the outside backs Penney was named in the New Zealand Academy in 2002.

In 2003 Penney moved to England where he joined Orrell for the 2003-2004 season. It was here that Penney was selected to represent England on the international seven's circuit in 2004.

The following season Penney moved to London Irish where he played for the club between 2004 and 2006, before linking up with North London club Saracens in 2006. Penney spent the middle part of the 2010 - 2011 season playing for the newly formed Aironi (which became de-funct in 2012) in the Pro 12, but returned to Saracens that same year.

Penney remained at Saracens until retiring in 2011 having played over 100 games for the club.

== Business career ==
Penney has pursued a business career after rugby.

== Personal life ==
He is the older brother of international basketball player Kirk Penney.
