= Andy Onyeama-Christie =

Scotland international rugby union player

- Full name: Andrew Chidozie Robert Onyeama-Christie
- Born: 22 March 1999 (age 27) Bristol, England
- Height: 1.89 m (6 ft 2 in)
- Weight: 103 kg (227 lb; 16 st 3 lb)
- School: Bristol Grammar School; Harrow School

Rugby union career
- Position(s): Flanker, Number 8
- Current team: Saracens
Senior career
Years	Team	Apps	(Points)
2017–2018	Old Albanian	15	(10)
2018–2019	Bishop's Stortford	10	(5)
2018–	Saracens	87	(55)
- Correct as of 24 March 2024
International career
Years	Team	Apps	(Points)
2022–	Scotland	8	(0)
2026	Scotland	1	(0)

Andrew Chidozie Robert Onyeama-Christie (born 22 March 1999) is a Scotland international rugby union player who plays as a flanker for Premiership Rugby club Saracens. Born in England, he represents Scotland at international level after qualifying on ancestry grounds.

== International career ==
Born and raised in England, he is Scottish qualified through descent, and was first selected for the Scottish national rugby team in January 2022, for the following Six Nations Championship. His first cap was gained as a replacement in the Six Nations match against France on 26 February 2022 at Murrayfield.

He played for Scotland 'A' on 6 February 2026 in their match against Italy XV.

== Personal life ==
Onyeama-Christie was born in England to a Nigerian father (Patrick Onyeama) and a British mother whose parents are Scottish (Victoria Christie). His grandfather, Charles Onyeama, was a judge of the Supreme Court of Nigeria, and the first Nigerian judge at the International Court of Justice.
