= Rotimi Segun =

English rugby union player

- Born: Oluwadurotimi Ayodeji O. Segun; 28 December 1996 (age 29) Enfield, London
- Height: 5 ft 11 in (180 cm)
- Weight: 14 st 6 lb (202 lb; 92 kg)
- School: Northampton School for Boys; Stowe School

Rugby union career
- Position: Wing
- Current team: Saracens
Senior career
Years	Team	Apps	(Points)
2015–2017	Loughborough Students	33	(72)
2016–	Saracens	78	(195)
- Correct as of 29 June 2024

Oluwadurotimi Ayodeji O. Segun, known as Rotimi Segun (born 28 December 1996) is an English professional rugby union player for Saracens in Premiership Rugby. His usual position is wing.

Segun made his first Premiership Rugby appearance for Saracens in February 2018 after appearing for Loughborough Students in National League 1 on loan. He signed new contracts in 2021 and 2026.
