= 2011 Premiership Rugby Sevens Series =

2011 J.P Morgan Asset Management Premiership Rugby 7s Series
- Countries: England
- Champions: Newcastle Falcons 7s (1st title)
- Runners-up: Saracens 7s
- Matches played: 25
- Tries scored: 152 (average 6.1 per match)

The 2011 Premiership Rugby Sevens Series, named for sponsorship reasons as the 2011 J.P Morgan Asset Management Premiership Rugby 7s Series, was the second Rugby Union 7-a-side competition for the 12 2011-12 Aviva Premiership Clubs. It began on Friday 15 July and lasted four weeks, with the final at the Twickenham Stoop on 5 August 2011. Newcastle Falcons won the title, beating Saracens in the final.

== Format ==
The twelve Premiership Clubs were split into three Groups – A, B and C – with each group playing on a consecutive Friday in July. Each team in the group played each other once, to the International Rugby Board Laws of the Game – 7s Variations. Based on the result, teams would receive:

- 4 points for a win
- 2 points for a draw
- 1 bonus point for a loss by seven points or less
- 1 bonus point for scoring four or more tries in a match

Following all the games, the winner and runner up in the group would progress to the finals. In the finals, the six teams were split into two pools. Again teams played each other once and points were awarded based on the result. Following the culmination of this stage the winners of each pool progressed to the final, the winner of that game being declared the champions.

== Group stage ==
Group A	Group B	Group C
Bath 7s	Gloucester 7s	Leicester Tigers 7s
Exeter Chiefs 7s	London Wasps 7s	Newcastle Falcons 7s
Harlequins 7s	Northampton Saints 7s	Sale Sharks 7s
London Irish 7s	Saracens 7s	Worcester Warriors 7s

=== Group A ===
Played at The Recreation Ground, Bath on Friday 15 July 2011.

Pos	Team	Pld	W	D	L	F	A	TF	TA	TB	LB	Pts
1	Harlequins 7s	3	3	0	0	93	17	15	3	3	0	15
2	Bath 7s	3	1	0	2	48	67	8	11	1	1	6
3	Exeter Chiefs 7s	3	1	1	1	40	79	6	13	0	0	6
4	London Irish 7s	3	0	1	2	53	71	9	11	1	1	4
Green background is the pool winner and qualified for the Final Stage. Blue background is the runner-up and also qualified for the Final Stage. Updated 7 July 2013 — source: Premiership Rugby

15 July 2011
19:30

Harlequins 7s	24 – 5	Bath 7s

The Recreation Ground

15 July 2011
19:55

London Irish 7s	19 – 19	Exeter Chiefs 7s

The Recreation Ground

15 July 2011
20:25

Exeter Chiefs 7s	0 – 43	Harlequins 7s

The Recreation Ground

15 July 2011
20:50

Bath 7s	26 – 22	London Irish 7s

The Recreation Ground

15 July 2011
21:20

Harlequins 7s	26 – 12	London Irish 7s

The Recreation Ground

15 July 2011
21:45

Exeter Chiefs 7s	21 – 17	Bath 7s

The Recreation Ground

=== Group B ===
Played at Franklin's Gardens, Northampton on Friday 22 July 2011.

Pos	Team	Pld	W	D	L	F	A	TF	TA	TB	LB	Pts
1	Saracens 7s	3	3	0	0	79	43	13	7	3	0	15
2	London Wasps 7s	3	2	0	1	64	36	10	6	1	0	9
3	Gloucester 7s	3	1	0	2	55	73	9	11	2	1	7
4	Northampton Saints 7s	3	0	0	3	28	74	4	12	0	0	0
Green background is the pool winner and qualified for the Final Stage. Blue background is the runner-up and also qualified for the Final Stage. Updated 7 July 2013 — source: Premiership Rugby

22 July 2011
19:30

Gloucester 7s	26 – 14	Northampton Saints 7s

Franklins Gardens

22 July 2011
19:55

London Wasps 7s	14 – 22	Saracens 7s

Franklins Gardens

22 July 2011
20:25

London Wasps 7s	31 – 7	Gloucester 7s

Franklins Gardens

22 July 2011
20:50

Northampton Saints 7s	7 – 29	Saracens 7s

Franklins Gardens

22 July 2011
21:20

Gloucester 7s	22 – 28	Saracens 7s

Franklins Gardens

22 July 2011
21:45

London Wasps 7s	19 – 7	Northampton Saints 7s

Franklins Gardens

=== Group C ===
Played at Edgeley Park, Stockport on Friday 29 July 2011.

Pos	Team	Pld	W	D	L	F	A	TF	TA	TB	LB	Pts
1	Newcastle Falcons 7s	3	3	0	0	75	24	13	4	1	0	13
2	Sale Sharks 7s	3	2	0	1	99	27	15	5	2	0	10
3	Worcester Warriors 7s	3	1	0	2	41	76	7	12	0	0	4
4	Leicester Tigers 7s	3	0	0	3	19	107	3	17	0	1	1
Green background is the pool winner and qualified for the Final Stage. Blue background is the runner-up and also qualified for the Final Stage. Updated 7 July 2013 — source: Premiership Rugby

29 July 2011
19:30

Newcastle Falcons 7s	15 – 7	Sale Sharks 7s

Edgely Park

29 July 2011
19:55

Worcester Warriors 7s	19 – 12	Leicester Tigers 7s

Edgely Park

29 July 2011
20:25

Leicester Tigers 7s	0 – 47	Sale Sharks 7s

Edgely Park

29 July 2011
20:50

Newcastle Falcons 7s	19 – 10	Worcester Warriors 7s

Edgely Park

29 July 2011
21:20

Newcastle Falcons 7s	41 – 7	Leicester Tigers 7s

Edgely Park

29 July 2011
21:45

Sale Sharks 7s	45 – 12	Worcester Warriors 7s

Edgely Park

== Final stage ==
The Final Stage was played at The Stoop, Twickenham on Friday 5 August 2011.

For the finals, the 6 qualified teams were split into two pools of three teams. Scoring will be the same as in the previous rounds (4 points for a win, etc.), and the winner of each pool progressed to the final.

=== Pool A ===
Pos	Team	Pld	W	D	L	F	A	TF	TA	TB	LB	Pts
1	Newcastle Falcons 7s	2	2	0	0	55	19	9	3	1	0	9
2	Harlequins 7s	2	1	0	1	31	17	5	3	0	1	5
3	London Wasps 7s	2	0	0	2	7	57	1	9	0	0	0
Green background is the pool winner and qualified for the Final Stage. Updated 7 July 2013 — source: Premiership Rugby

5 August 2011
19:00

Harlequins 7s	19 – 0	London Wasps 7s

Twickenham Stoop

5 August 2011
19:50

London Wasps 7s	7 – 38	Newcastle Falcons 7s

Twickenham Stoop

5 August 2011
20:40

Harlequins 7s	12 – 17	Newcastle Falcons 7s

Twickenham Stoop

=== Pool B ===
Pos	Team	Pld	W	D	L	F	A	TF	TA	TB	LB	Pts
1	Saracens 7s	2	2	0	0	59	12	9	2	1	0	9
2	Bath 7s	2	1	0	1	35	50	5	8	1	0	5
3	Sale Sharks 7s	2	0	0	2	17	49	3	7	0	0	0
Green background is the pool winner and qualified for the Final Stage. Updated 7 July 2013 — source: Premiership Rugby

5 August 2011
19:25

Bath 7s	7 – 38	Saracens 7s

Twickenham Stoop

5 August 2011
20:15

Saracens 7s	21 – 5	Sale Sharks 7s

Twickenham Stoop

5 August 2011
21:05

Bath 7s	28 – 12	Sale Sharks 7s

Twickenham Stoop

=== Final ===
Newcastle Falcons 7s and Saracens 7s won their respective pools and therefore played in the final of the 2011 Premiership Rugby Sevens Series.

5 August 2011
21:40

Saracens 7s	21 – 31	Newcastle Falcons 7s

Twickenham Stoop
Referee: JP Doyle

- Newcastle Falcons 7s won the 2011 Premiership Rugby Sevens Series.
