= Noah Cato =

English rugby union player (born 1988)

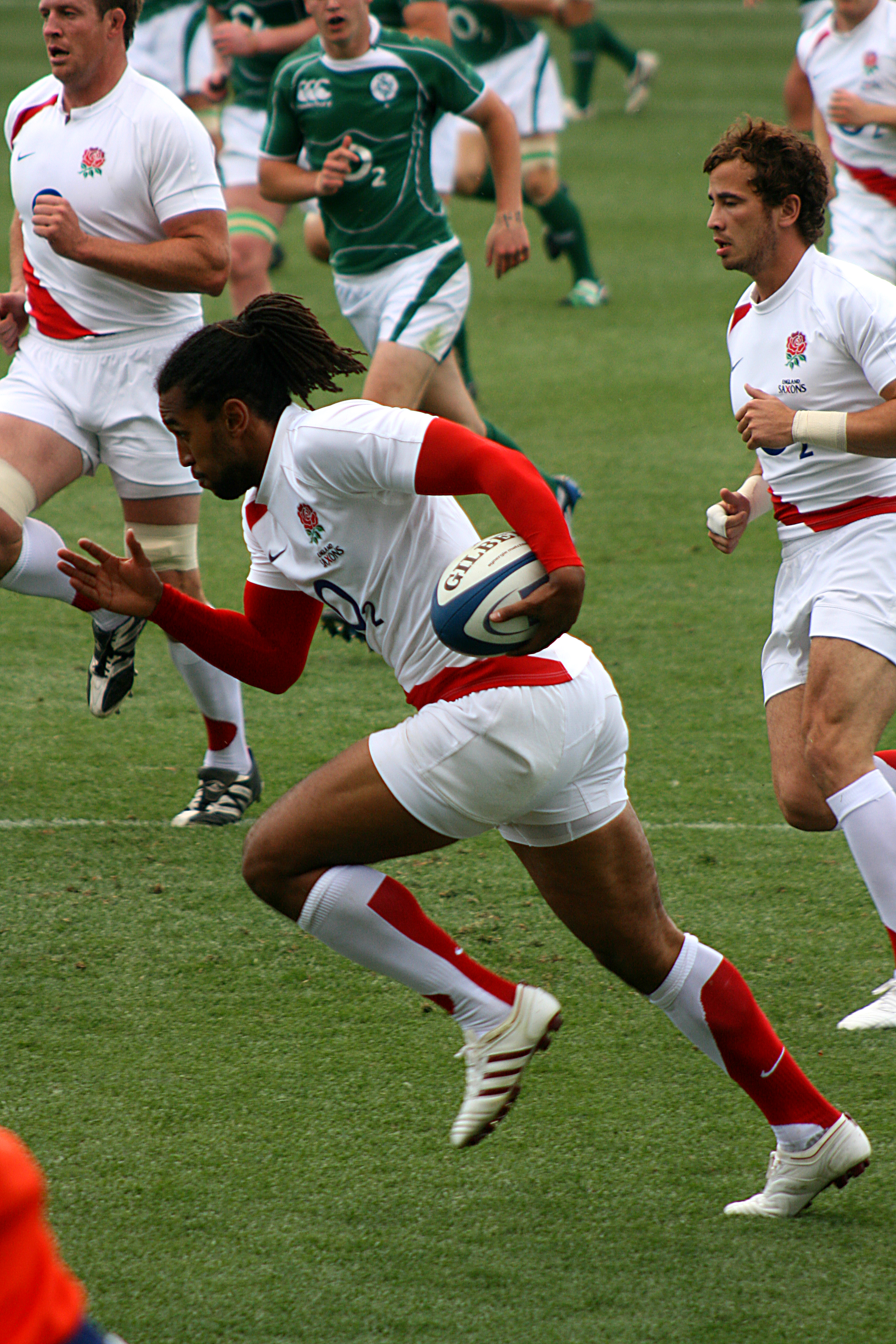
- Cato in 2009
- Born: Noah Cato; 31 March 1988 (age 38) Brighton, England
- Height: 1.80 m (5 ft 11 in)
- Weight: 95 kg (14 st 13 lb)
- School: St. Aubyns School; Hurstpierpoint College
- University: University of Hertfordshire
- Notable relative: Glenn Wilson

Rugby union career
- Position(s): Wing, Fullback
- Current team: Newcastle Falcons
Senior career
Years	Team	Apps	(Points)
2007–2011	Saracens	56	(70)
2007-2008	London Welsh (loan)	2	(10)
2011–2013	Northampton Saints	1	(0)
2013–2015	Newcastle Falcons	28	(40)
International career
Years	Team	Apps	(Points)
2008	England U20	10	(45)
2009	England Saxons	4	(10)
- Correct as of 31 January 2010
National sevens team
Years	Team		Comps
2007	England		

Noah Cato (born 31 March 1988) is an English rugby union player who plays as a wing and fullback for Wimbledon RFC in the National League 2 South.

He was educated at St. Aubyns School, Rottingdean, Hurstpierpoint College and at the University of Hertfordshire.

== Club career ==
Cato made his full debut for Saracens against Leeds Carnegie during the 2007–08 season. He signed a new contract in January 2010. On 5 April 2011 it was announced that Cato would be joining Northampton Saints for the 2011–12 season. Before he departed he was a replacement as Saracens won their first Premiership title. On 26 February 2013, he signed for Newcastle Falcons for the rest of the 2012–13 season, after leaving Northampton. However, he signed a permanent deal to stay with Newcastle from the 2013–14 season. His last game for Newcastle Falcons was on 28 March 2015 against London Irish. In 2017, he returned to rugby playing for Wimbledon in National 2 South, level 4.

== International career ==
Cato represented England at the 2007 Under 19 Rugby World Championship. In May 2007, he made his debut for the England Sevens team at the London Sevens.

In 2008, he was a member of the England under-20 team that won the grand slam and reached the final of the 2008 IRB Junior World Championship.

In January 2009, Cato made his debut for the England Saxons against Portugal and played at the 2009 Churchill Cup.
