= Ben Ransom =

English rugby union footballer

- Born: Benjamin Philip Ransom; 16 February 1992 (age 34) Bexley, Kent
- Height: 1.78 m (5 ft 10 in)
- Weight: 82 kg (12 st 13 lb)
- School: Tonbridge School
- University: University of Hertfordshire, University of Oxford
- Occupation: Full-time student

Rugby union career
- Position: Fullback
Senior career
Years	Team	Apps	(Points)
2010–2016	Saracens	44	(45)
2011–2014	→ Bedford Blues	21	(35)
2016–2018	London Irish	26	(50)
- Correct as of 23 November 2019

Ben Ransom (born 16 February 1992 in Bexley, Kent) is an ex-rugby union player who last played for London Irish in the Greene King IPA Championship. He played at Fullback and has represented England at U16, U18 and U20 level. He was educated at Tonbridge School in Kent. He previously attended St Michael’s School, Otford and appeared for Old Elthamians, having first played the game at school and club when seven.

The 2010-11 Aviva Premiership was the season Ransom made his debut for Saracens against the Northampton Saints and he was named man of the match. Overall in the season he made 4 appearances and scored 1 try. Having turned down an offer from the University of Bristol when signing for Sarries, he undertook a degree in economics at Hertfordshire University alongside playing rugby. In the six seasons he spent with Saracens, he made 44 appearances, along with 21 appearances on loan to Bedford Blues and helped the club win the Premiership title three times as well as the European Rugby Champions Cup.

On 22 July it was announced that Ransom had joined newly relegated London Irish ahead of the 2016-17 season and his spell started well as they gained their first Championship title and promotion back to the Premiership, with Ransom featuring in the majority of their 19 wins. The clinical winger notched up nine tries during that season, including a contender for Try of the Season in the annual Saint Patrick's Party against Cornish Pirates, a match that also had the Championship season's highest attendance of 11,671. The following season, Ransom fell behind in the pecking order and first-team appearances were limited to the European Challenge Cup. In October 2017, he scored in an emphatic 7-44 win against Challenge Cup holders Stade Français at the Stade Jean-Bouin. In the final Premiership Rugby A League fixture of the season, Ransom scored as Irish recorded a 33-19 victory against Bristol Bears. Irish were relegated and Ransom decided to leave the club a year before his contract expired in order to pursue his other ambitions.

In 2018, after spells at both Saracens and London Irish, the 26-year-old Ransom began studying for a master's degree in Business administration at the University of Oxford and preparing to move into investment banking – although not before one last bout – taking full advantage, Oxford wasted no time before he was seconded to help beat Cambridge in The Varsity Match, for which he was only too happy to oblige, and unsurprisingly, with his pedigree, Oxford won 38-16 and Ransom was named man of the match.

A university side is never going to compare to a professional set-up but the guys here are committed.

For some of the squad, it’s going to be one of the biggest games they’ll ever play in. It’s a case of getting our own shapes and processes right and making sure that we can perform under pressure.

I was a younger player in my professional career so it’s interesting coming in here. I’m an older player, but not more experienced in terms of understanding what the Varsity is all about – one of our guys has played in it four times!

For me it’s about learning about the culture and the history behind the fixture and everyone’s buying into that: we’re all aiming to beat Cambridge.
