= Matt Hankin =

English rugby union player

- Born: Matt Hankin; 30 April 1993 (age 33) Bromley, England
- Height: 1.88 m (6 ft 2 in)
- Weight: 100 kg (15 st 10 lb; 220 lb)
- School: Langley Park School for Boys; Haileybury College
- University: Hertfordshire University

Rugby union career
- Position: Flanker
Senior career
Years	Team	Apps	(Points)
2011–2018	Saracens	13	(10)
2013–2014	→ Bedford	6	(0)
International career
Years	Team	Apps	(Points)
2013	England U20	4	(5)

Matt Hankin (born 3 April 1993) is an English professional rugby union player. He plays at flanker for Saracens. He was educated at Langley School for Boy's, before attending Haileybury College, a boarding school in Hertfordshire. After a long-term injury with concussion he retired from Saracens at the end of the 2017/18 season.
