= Scott Spurling =

English rugby union player

- Born: Scott Spurling; 10 June 1993 (age 33) Hendon, London Borough of Barnet, England
- Height: 1.78 m (5 ft 10 in)
- Weight: 100 kg (15 st 10 lb; 220 lb)

Rugby union career
- Position: Hooker
Amateur team(s)
Years	Team	Apps	(Points)
2011–2012	Old Albanian RFC	8	(5)
- Correct as of 3 September 2018
Senior career
Years	Team	Apps	(Points)
2011–2019	Saracens	28	(5)
2012–2014	→Bedford	31	(27)
- Correct as of 1 September 2018
International career
Years	Team	Apps	(Points)
2012–2013	England U20	6	(0)

Scott Spurling (born 6 June 1993 in Hendon, England) is an English former professional rugby union player. He played at hooker for Saracens and attended Haberdashers' Aske's Boys' School in Elstree, Hertfordshire as well as attending Harrow School for sixth form. Junior Commonwealth Games gold medalist 2011. Junior World Cup U20 Winner 2013.
