= Mouritz Botha =

South African-born English rugby union player

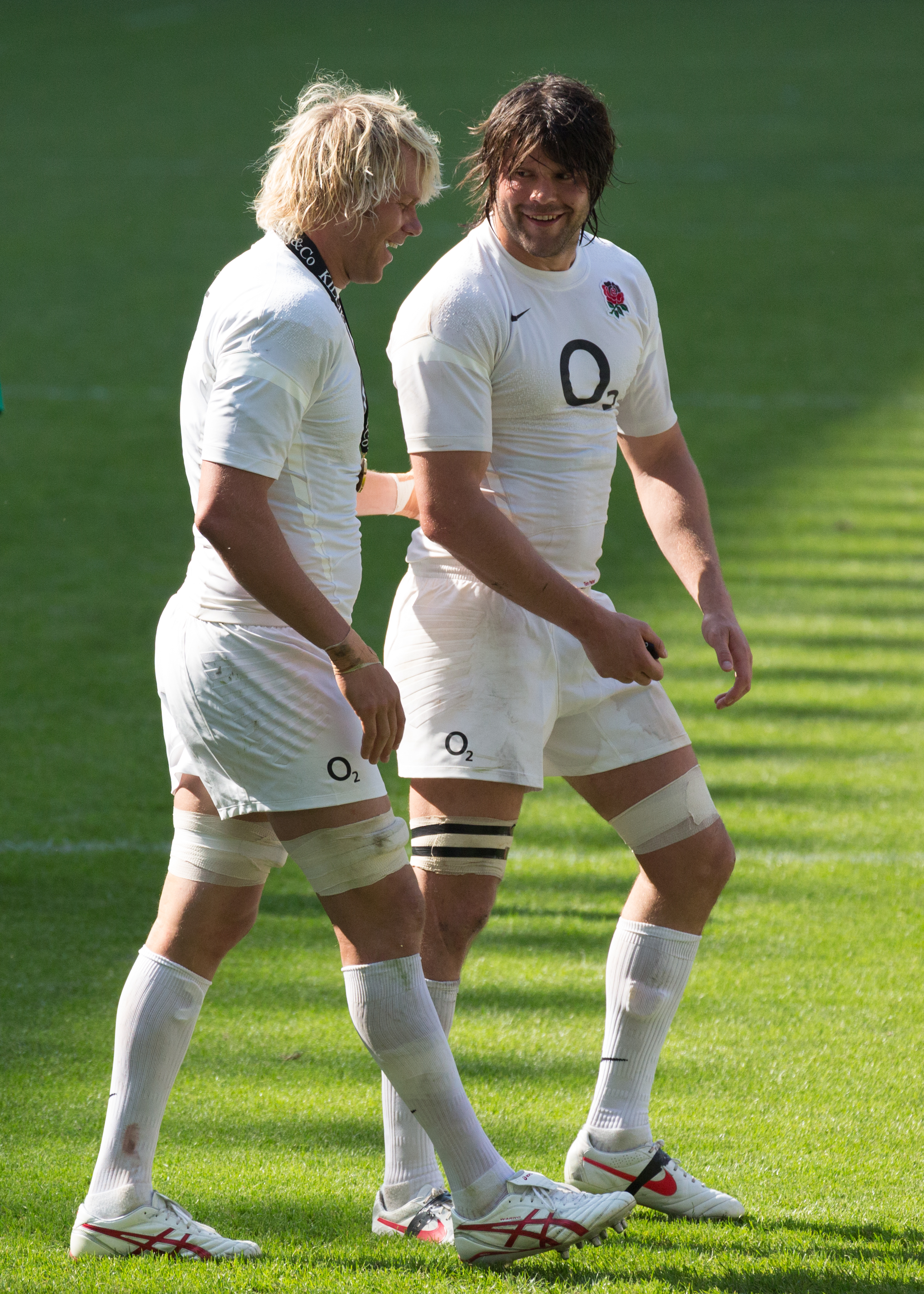
- Mouritz Botha (left) and Tom Palmer of the England rugby union team share a smile after beating the Barbarians 57–26 in a match at Twickenham Stadium.
- Born: 29 January 1982 (age 44) Vryheid, South Africa
- Height: 1.98 m (6 ft 6 in)
- Weight: 114 kg (17 st 13 lb)

Rugby union career
Senior career
Years	Team	Apps	(Points)
2006–2009	Bedford Blues	73	(55)
2009–2014	Saracens	142	(15)
2015–2017	Newcastle Falcons	26	(0)
- Correct as of 26 June 2018
Super Rugby
Years	Team	Apps	(Points)
2015	Sharks	11	(0)
- Correct as of 14 June 2015
International career
Years	Team	Apps	(Points)
2011–2012	England Saxons	10	(0)
2011–2012	England	10	(0)
Coaching career
- Years: Team
- 2017–: Germany

Mouritz Botha (born 29 January 1982) is a former rugby union player who played for Saracens and Newcastle Falcons in the Aviva Premiership. He joined English club Bedford Blues in 2006 and made 73 appearances before moving to Saracens in 2009. Born in South Africa, Botha was named in the 2011 England Saxons squad for the Churchill Cup after qualifying for England on residency grounds. He was forced to retire on 30 September 2017, on medical advice related to concussion.

== Bedford Blues ==
Botha joined Bedford Blues from Bedford Athletic in 2006 and was a mainstay in the team. Botha was selected for an East Midlands team that played in a match against the Barbarians. His performances got the attention of the incoming Saracens head coach Brendan Venter and he was signed for Saracens in 2009.

== Saracens ==
Botha was signed for Saracens in the summer of 2009 from the National League 1 team the Bedford Blues. He made his debut on 5 September 2009 in the London Double Header against London Irish. He came on as a substitute in the 60th minute for fellow Saracens lock Hugh Vyvyan. Mouritz was a success in his first season for Saracens and quickly became a fans' favourite. The season ended in an appearance in the Guinness Premiership Final for Saracens. He again came on as a substitute in this game. He made a total of 32 appearances in the 2009–2010 season, scoring one try.

Botha played a vital role in helping Saracens to win the 2010–11 English Premiership. Along the way, he made 27 appearances and was named in the 2011 Sky Sports Dream Team. He was named in the 2011 England Saxons squad for the Churchill Cup and made his debut in the 87–8 victory over the United States. He was subsequently selected in the full England squad and made his debut against Wales.

In Botha's third season for Saracens, he was a frequent starter and helping them to finish in the semi-final places of the 2011–12 English Premiership, before losing to Leicester Tigers in the semi-final. In total, he made 24 appearances for Saracens scoring one try. He also made appearances for England in both the Six Nations Championship and in all three tests on England's tour of South Africa.

During the season, Botha made his 100th appearance for the club in the 40–7 win over Edinburgh, helping Saracens to win their Heineken Cup pool and giving them a home quarter final draw against Ulster. Botha also started in the first ever Aviva Premiership match to be played at Saracens' new ground Allianz Park, in a 31–11 victory over Exeter Chiefs. Botha came off of the bench as a second-half substitute for Alistair Hargreaves to help Saracens to a 27–16 victory over Ulster in the quarter final of the Heineken Cup setting up a semi final with Toulon at Twickenham. So far in the season, Botha has made 24 appearances for Saracens, scoring 1 try.

== Sharks ==
After spending five-and-a-half seasons at Saracens, Botha returned to South Africa prior to the 2015 Super Rugby season, signing for Durban-based side the Sharks. He made eleven appearances for the Sharks in the Super Rugby season, but could not prevent them having a disappointing season, missing out on the finals series by finishing fourth in the South African Conference and 11th on the overall log.

== Newcastle Falcons ==
After just one season at the Sharks, Botha returned to England to join the Newcastle Falcons on a three-year contract prior to the 2015–16 English Premiership season.

== International career ==
Although he was born in South Africa, Botha qualified for England on residency grounds, having moved to England in 2004. Botha impressed with his performances for Saracens on the way to them becoming the Aviva Premiership champions and this led to him being named in the 2011 England Saxons squad for the Churchill Cup. In 2011, he was selected in the England 44-man squad for the 2011 Rugby World Cup and made his England debut in the 23–19 victory over Wales, although he eventually missed out on selection for England's World Cup Squad.

Botha played in every game of England's 2012 Six Nations campaign, ultimately helping them to a second-place finish. At the end of 2012, Botha was named in the England squad for their tour of South Africa. Returning to his homeland, he started in England's 22–17 loss to South Africa. He later started in the second test and came on as a substitute in the 14–14 draw with South Africa in the last test.
