= Saracens F.C. =

English rugby union club, based in North London

Saracens
- Full name: Saracens Rugby Club
- Union: Middlesex RFU
- Nickname(s): Sarries, Men in Black, Wolf Pack, Fez Boys
- Emblem: Star and crescent
- Founded: 1876; 150 years ago
- Location: Hendon, Greater London, England
- Ground: StoneX Stadium (Note: Saracens also operate a ground-share agreement with Tottenham Hotspur, to play one showpiece home fixture per season, known as The Showdown, at the Tottenham Hotspur Stadium.) (Capacity: 10,500 (Note: Barnet Copthall capacity can be increased up to 15,000 with temporary seating.))
- Chairman: Neil Golding
- CEO: Ed Coetzee
- Director of Rugby: Brendan Venter
- Coach: Joe Shaw
- Captain: Maro Itoje
- Most appearances: Alex Goode; 402 (All Competitions)
- Top scorer: Owen Farrell; 2712 (All Competitions)
- Most tries: Chris Ashton; 75 (All Competitions)
- League: PREM Rugby
- 2025–26: 5th of 10
1st kit	2nd kit

Largest win
- Saracens 151–0 Dinamo București (Vicarage Road, Watford, England); 20 October 2002

Largest defeat
- Twickenham 64–0 Saracens (Twickenham, London, England); 13 December 1919

Official website
- saracens.com
- Current season

Saracens Rugby Club (/ˈsærəsənz/) is an English professional rugby union club based in North London, currently playing in the Gallagher PREM – the highest level of competition in England – and European Professional Club Rugby.

Established in 1876, the club has spent most of its existence in and around Southgate in the London Borough of Barnet. Since 2012, Saracens have played their home games at Copthall Stadium (currently known as StoneX Stadium for sponsorship reasons) in Hendon, in the borough of Barnet. Before this, they played at Vicarage Road in Watford for 15 years, the current home of Watford F.C. The club's home kit playing colours are black and red. They are also affiliated with the Saracens Women's team, which competes in the top tier Premiership Women's Rugby competition.

Saracens have won 11 major trophies. They have been crowned European champions on three occasions – in 2016, 2017 and 2019. The club has also won the English Premiership six times – most recently in 2023 – and the domestic cup twice – in 1998, and 2015. In addition, they have won Champ Rugby, the second division title, three times – in 1989, 1995, and 2021.

== History ==
=== Origins ===
Saracens were founded in 1876 by the Old Boys of the Philological School in Marylebone, London (later to become St Marylebone Grammar School). The club's name is said to come from the "endurance, enthusiasm, and perceived invincibility of Saladin's desert warriors of the 12th century". The fact that their local rivals were called the "Crusaders" may also have been a factor. The Crescent and Star appearing in the club's emblem are reminiscent of those appearing on the flag of Tunisia. Saracens amalgamated with the rival neighbouring club Crusaders two years later in 1878.

In 1892, Saracens moved from Crown Lane, Southgate, to Firs Farm, Winchmore Hill. They then played on nine different grounds before the move to Bramley Road, Southgate, for the 1939–40 season (although the Second World War prevented them from playing there until 1945).

After their inaugural match against Blackheath, the Saracens had to wait another 9 years before Harlequins offered to include them on their fixture list. Saracens found it difficult to get games against first-class sides as the facilities at Bramley Road were so poor.

The club produced several internationals in the pre-league era, such as hooker John Steeds who won five caps representing England from 1949 to 1950; Vic Harding, a lock also for England from 1961 to 1962; and George Sherriff, an England back-rower from 1966 to 1967.

The club enjoyed fixtures with the leading clubs for many years and enjoyed a particularly successful time in the 1970s when they reached the semi-finals of the National Cup. Special games played at Bramley Road during this period include the 1971 match against a select International XV. The game was reportedly attended by a 5,000 strong crowd (the largest ever to watch a rugby union game in North London at the time). They came to watch a magnificent contest, ending Saracens 34 International XV 34.

This Saracens team also won the 1972 Middlesex Cup, beating Met Police in the final. Wasps were beaten in three Middlesex Cup finals in 1976, 1980, and 1986.

=== The Courage leagues ===
After some bleak years in the early 1980s, the club responded to the challenge of the Courage League, and with Floyd Steadman as captain and Tony Russ as coach, they won the second division in 1989 with a 100% record. The next year in the first division they surprised many by finishing fourth in the league behind Wasps, Gloucester, and Bath.

Within the space of two years, Saracens had lost Jason Leonard to Harlequins, Dean Ryan to Wasps, and Ben Clarke to Bath. Many proclaimed that they were quickly becoming a nursery for the more prestigious clubs. The 1992–93 season saw the leagues restructured. This caused Saracens and three other clubs to get relegated to the second division. In 1993–94 Saracens finished third and narrowly missed out on promotion but the following year they finished as champions and were again back in the top flight.

Former player David Wellman was given the task to re-brand Saracens. He gave former player Mike Smith the remit to take Saracens professional. A sponsor was required to improve the ground and playing staff. Saracens' seesaw existence over the nineties was about to continue in 1995–96 when they again found themselves at the wrong end of the table along with West Hartlepool but they were saved by their new CEO Mike Smith, who persuaded the RFU that there should be no relegation for the first season of professional rugby.

=== The professional era ===
==== 1996–2000 ====
In November 1995, Saracens gained the financial backing of Nigel Wray. This enabled the club to recruit the likes of Michael Lynagh, Philippe Sella, Francois Pienaar and Kyran Bracken. Saracens moved again to Enfield F.C.'s ground, Southbury Road, and they started the new season with a victory over title favourites Leicester. They only finished seventh, just missing out on Heineken Cup qualification.

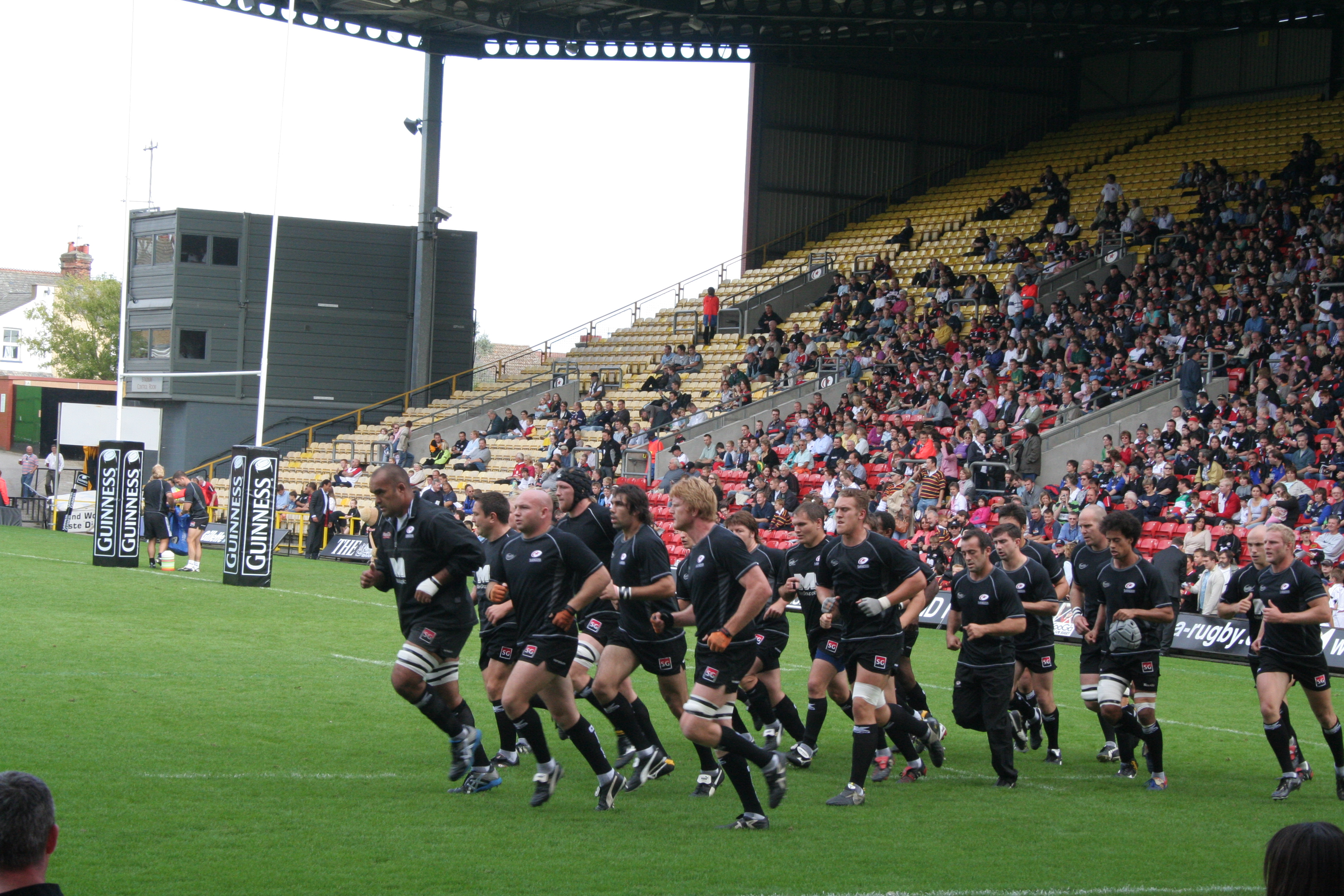
Saracens at a home match

The 1997–98 season was a landmark year. They began a ground share with Watford FC and their 22,000 all-seater Vicarage Road Stadium. The agreement ran until February 2013, when Saracens relocated to Barnet Copthall.

The appointment of Peter Deakin as Chief Executive saw Saracens splashed all over the broadsheets, tabloids, magazines and TV and with the help of a small band of fez-wearing followers that had been following the club for a number of years, "the year of the Fez" began.

Close season signings like Danny Grewcock, Roberto Grau, Gavin Johnson and Ryan Constable joined forces with the home grown talent of Tony Diprose, Richard Hill and Steve Ravenscroft to form a side that would prove a significant force during the season. This team lost only three games during the season to finish second in the Premiership, missing out narrowly to Newcastle, another club that had embraced the changes that the professional game had brought.

Consolation for missing out on the league title came in the then principal domestic cup competition, the Tetley Bitter Cup. Saracens beat Wasps by 48–18 in the cup final at Twickenham, in doing so equalling Bath's cup final record score of 48 points. Their run had included a 59-point win over Blackheath, a 14–13 victory over Leicester, a quarter final 36–30 win over Richmond, followed by a victory over Northampton. It was the first major silverware that Saracens had won in their 122-year history. The game was also notable for being the last competitive game for two legends of the sport, Lynagh and Sella. Both of them were inducted into Saracens' Hall of Fame.

After a solid start to 1998–99 season, Saracens were rocked in December when they lost to third from bottom London Scottish in a shock defeat at home, but a win against Bedford and West Hartlepool and a draw with Wasps still saw them in touch with leaders Leicester. The second half of the season was a roller coaster ride with Saracens going from eighth and out of European contention after a run of four losses, to eventually finishing third as London's top club.

The 1999–2000 season saw more big name players move to Vicarage Road, with Mark Mapletoft, Thierry Lacroix, Scott Murray and Dan Luger joining the club, along with Darragh O'Mahony and the up-and-coming Julian White. With the squad ravaged by World Cup duty and then injury the club's first attempt at the Heineken Cup was not a happy one. They lost three games by a couple of points in the last seconds of the game and did not make the quarter finals.

With a few games left, they were looking at a possible failure to qualify for Europe again, but Kyran Bracken returned from a ten-month injury to inspire Saracens into fourth place and Heineken Cup qualification.

==== 2000–2006 ====
2000–01 saw another difficult start to the season. By October, Saracens had effectively crashed out of the Heineken Cup with back to back defeats to Cardiff, and with the team short of internationals due to the Autumn Tests, the final blow was dealt when Thomas Castaignède suffered an Achilles tendon injury.

The results went downhill fast, and a fifth-place finish saw the club miss out on a Heineken Cup place.

The 2001–02 season brought many changes, with established players such as Luger, Grewcock, White and, much to the consternation of his loyal fan club, Diprose, all leaving the club. Further weakened with the news that Castaignède was likely to miss the whole of the coming season, Francois Pienaar, now in full control of coaching operations, opted to make use of a crop of younger players coming through the club system.

After a reasonable start to the season, Saracens found themselves in their by-then accustomed top half of the table position. The curse of the Autumn Internationals once again took its toll, and Saracens' performances weakened drastically. Entering the New Year, Saracens were again flirting with relegation danger, and soon exited all cup competitions. With morale sinking, Pienaar stepped down from his various roles with the club after a five-year stay.

Lacking a coach, the senior players took charge, the morale problem seemed to have passed, but results remained sketchy, and the Saracens ended up in a lowly 10th place.

All Black legend Buck Shelford took over the coaching reins for the 2002–03 season, while the playing squad saw the arrival of the likes of Andy Goode, Christian Califano, and Craig Quinnell amongst several signings of established players. In a repetition of the pattern of some of the preceding seasons, Saracens once again got off to a flying start, beating Bath and Bristol.

Defeats by London rivals, Wasps and London Irish, moved the team in danger of the relegation zone. The only real success coming in an impressive run in the European Challenge Cup.

The club once again rallied towards the tail end of the season, with victories over Bristol, and then high flying Sale securing a 5th place in the table, that seemed unlikely at the turn of the year, and a place in the play off system for the remaining European Cup place. A comfortable win over fourth-place Leeds in the play off semi-final brought an astonishingly tight final against Leicester.

With temperatures soaring at Franklin's Gardens, 80 minutes was not enough to separate the teams, with a late rally by Saracens tying the scores at 20–20. Ultimately, a Neil Back try was to see Leicester through, but at least it appeared that Saracens had rediscovered their fighting spirit.

The late rally was not enough to save Shelford, and he and most of the rest of the coaching staff paid the price for the weak season, being replaced by the experienced Australia and Leicester player, Rod Kafer, at that time a relative newcomer to a coaching roll, for the 2003–04 season. Key signings included Fijian Simon Raiwalui, former French captain Raphaël Ibañez, Springbok Cobus Visagie, and All Black Taine Randell.

The club's finances were also diversified, with Nigel Wray divesting himself of nearly 50% of his shares to spread the financial cost and risk of supporting Saracens. This led to the addition of five new members being appointed to the Saracens' board.

The change of faces did little to change the pattern of consistent inconsistency of previous seasons. Once again, the early rounds saw a false dawn as Saracens found themselves in the top three, and again the club coped badly with the international call-ups for the 2003 World Cup, once again finding themselves near the foot of the table. Only the long gap to bottom place Rotherham avoided any serious relegation danger. The victorious return of Richard Hill and Kyran Bracken from World Cup duty brought somewhat more upbeat performances for the second half of the season, but it still took a rare away victory at London Irish to claim the same 10th place of two seasons before.

2004–05 saw a bold strengthening of the squad, for once eschewing their cosmopolitan recruitment policy and securing mainly English based players, possibly with one eye on the effect that international call-ups had had in previous seasons. In came Kevin Yates, Iain Fullarton, Alex Sanderson, Dan Scarbrough and Hugh Vyvyan, while Matt Cairns returned to the club and Steve Diamond arrived at the club as forwards coach. Another signing who was to become a prominent part of the Saracens' line up was fly half Glen Jackson from New Zealand.

The season got off to the best off all possible starts with Saracens scoring a victory over reigning champions Wasps at the first ever London 'Double Header' at Twickenham. Once again, Saracens' winter malaise struck, and after inconsistent performances, Diamond took over the coaching duties from Kafer. The New Year brought a string of convincing performances, and a long unbeaten run saw the club finish the season in the top half of the table, in fifth place.

Once again in the wild card system for a European Cup place, Worcester were comfortably beaten, setting up the chance to end the season where it had begun, back at Twickenham. A late try secured victory over Gloucester and a place in the next season's Heineken Cup was ensured.

There was further shuffling of the coaching pack in 2005–06 with Diamond becoming Director of Rugby and defensive coach Mike Ford taking over the front line coaching role. In a reversal of the previous season's outcome Saracens lost their opening double-header game against Wasps, but unlike some previous seasons, this did not immediately trigger a run of bad results, and indeed until December Saracens progressed well. The Christmas season saw the start of a calamitous dip in form and going into the final months of the season the prospect of ending up in another relegation scrap seemed very real.

Diamond parted company with the club, with Ford taking over full control of the team, assisted by future England coach Eddie Jones in a consulting role. Results improved, and an away win at Sale who were to be champions that season even brought the prospect of another Heineken cup place.

A few disappointing results at the end of the season took some of the shine off the improved run of form, with Saracens ending the season in 10th place. The season's end also brought to a close the distinguished playing career of Kyran Bracken.

==== 2006–07 ====
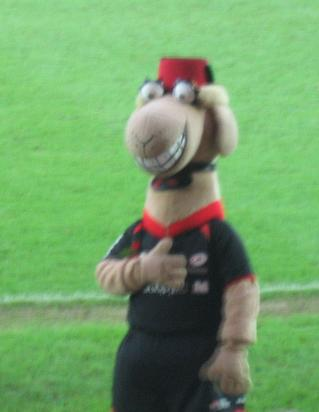
Saracens mascot Sarrie the Camel

With Mike Ford being offered a role in the England set-up, former Leinster, Munster and Australia coach Alan Gaffney was appointed coach for the 2006 campaign. Among the new signings was South African, Neil de Kock, a player who was influential in the club's best season since 2000. Once again, Saracens were narrowly defeated by Wasps in the London double-header.

This was to be followed by what turned out to be a good away draw at Bristol in the context of the excellent season that Bristol would go on to have, before a bonus point win was secured against the Newcastle Falcons. A morale-boosting run of results followed, losing only three times between October and the following March. No individual result could quite produce the reaction that the return of England's Richard Hill to top flight action, with supporters of both clubs giving Hill a huge ovation on his return to the pitch after 18 months of knee reconstruction, capping off his comeback with a try.

This period also saw the long-awaited arrival of former Great Britain Rugby League captain, Andy Farrell, initially at flanker, but later at centre, the position at which he went on to take his England debut.

With the prospect of a place in the Premiership play-offs becoming ever more real, Saracens were also progressing well in the European Challenge Cup. They qualified for the knockout stages as second seeds, with only an away draw at Glasgow spoiling their group stage progression. A further win at the quarter-final stage against Glasgow saw Saracens host Bath for the semi-final, only to lose to ultimate runners up of the competition.

Results in the Premiership went Saracens' way, leaving them with the possibility of ending up anywhere from second to fifth as the final round of matches approached. After a day of games almost all of which had significant consequences in terms of positions at the top, and at the foot of the table, Saracens found themselves in the Premiership playoffs for the first time, squeezing Wasps into a rare 5th-place position, out of playoff contention.

The campaign concluded with a defeat awat from Gloucester, although the season overall marked an improvement compared with recent years. Following the season, Glen Jackson received the PRA Player of the Year Award after finishing as the leagues top socere with 400 points and maintaining consistent performances throughout the campaign. At the end of the season, Thomas Castaignède announced his retirement from the club rugby after playing for Saracens and the French national teams.

==== 2007–08 ====
Preparation for the 2007–08 seasons saw somewhat less activity in comings and goings from the squad, reflecting the relatively solid 2006–07 season. Among signings to date, specialist cover for Glen Jackson came in the form of Scotland fly half Gordon Ross, while South African utility back Brent Russell was highly regarded by many Springbok fans.

The most spectacular signing though was that of All Black second row Chris Jack, widely regarded as the world's best in his position, who joined Saracens after the 2007 World Cup. In addition to his all-round game, Saracens hoped that Jack would bring some solidity to a Saracens' line-out which was one of the areas where they were consistently pressured in the previous season. The estimated value of Jack's contract raised eyebrows with a three-year contract at a total value of £750,000.

The loss of Glen Jackson and Brent Russell for the opening of the season due to pre-season injuries represented a significant blow to the club, but nonetheless the season began well with a return to winning ways against Wasps in the opening day London double-header. Defeat at the first home game by early pace setters Gloucester brought the team down to earth, before a solid away win at struggling Leeds, revenge for the previous season's home and away defeats away at Worcester, and a win back at Vicarage Road over Leicester. Defensive frailties saw Saracens go into the Autumn Premiership break for cup matches third in the table, but also with the third worst defensive record, after a defeat away at Sale.

The first round of cup competition saw Saracens win comfortably away at Leeds in the EDF Energy Cup, despite conceding four tries. Another bonus point win over Bristol back at Vicarage Road positioned Saracens well with maximum points ahead of a difficult away trip to Llanelli. Turning to Europe, Saracens' return to Heineken Cup action also saw the return of Glasgow Warriors to Vicarage Road. As in the two European Challenge Cup home games against the same team in the previous season, Saracens ran out bonus point winners, albeit not without defensive frailties causing anxious moments going into the final minutes of the game. The following weekend Saracens lost out by a single point against Biarritz Olympique being denied by a penalty scored from the half-way line in the dying moments of the match.

The brief return to Guinness Premiership action at the end of November saw Saracens come out top in a tight battle at home against London Irish, with the lead changing hands several times. Cup action in the form of the final round of EDF Energy Cup pool stage games, where Saracens failed once again to win away in Wales, but taking a losing bonus point and a try bonus too was enough to see them qualify for the semi-final stage for the first time in their Anglo-Welsh cup history, ahead of their opponents Llanelli Scarlets. Further progress was then made in the Heineken Cup in an impressive ten try to one defeat of Viadana at home in a game which saw the first team debuts for Chris Jack and Brent Russell. Viadana almost took their revenge in the return fixture the following week, where Saracens conceded a 26–3 half time lead to the Italians, before showing composure in the second half to score 31 unanswered points and take the win that would see them enter the New Year at the head of their Heineken Cup pool.

The return to premiership action over Christmas and the New Year began well for Saracens with a win away at London rivals Harlequins, however once again defensive weakness and coming out of the blocks slowly saw Saracens take only a losing bonus point from their final fixture of 2007 in the Premiership, though it was enough to see them go into the New Year in third place in the domestic league.

The buildup to the first game of 2008 was dominated by talk away from the field of play, with the news that former Wallaby coach Eddie Jones was to succeed Alan Gaffney at the top of the coaching subject with Gaffney adopting the same consulting role Jones had been providing, while rumours of substantial cash investment from South African rugby interests abounded. When the focus returned to on-field matters Saracens suffered a second successive defeat in the Premiership, this time away at Bristol, failing even to take a losing bonus point for the first time in any competition in the season and raising fears of the all too familiar Saracens' winter slump.

==== 2009–10 ====
The arrival of Brendan Venter to the head coach role sparked major controversy. Shortly after arrival he triggered the culling of 18 players within 48 hours, known among fans as "the night of the long knives", this would then be followed up by the arrival of a number of South Africans to the squad. This caused the club to be strongly criticised as they were seen to be swaying away from being an English club. Some even began calling the club "Saffracens", due to their strong South African links (Saffa being slang for South African).

This didn't stop Saracens going on a 10-match unbeaten run at the start of the domestic season which saw wins over London Irish (at Twickenham in the London Double Header), Northampton (at Wembley), London Wasps and Bath.

On 16 November a Derick Hougaard drop goal saw a one-point win over South Africa at Wembley. Viewed by some as a notable example of the South Africa excessive presence (Saracens fielded 9 South Africans), Saracens managed to overturn a 6–18 half time deficit to win 24–23. Generating greater publicity than the actual game was Stuart Tinner managing to win £250,000 by kicking a ball to directly hit the crossbar of the posts.

27 December saw Saracens lose away to London Irish, which was their first defeat of the domestic league competition, having had one draw and two losses in all competitions before this date. What followed were five defeats in the next six games; Leicester, Wasps, Bath and Leeds Carnegie all defeated Saracens, accompanied by being knocked out of the Amlin Challenge Cup despite losing only one match.

The post-Christmas slump in form for Saracens looked all too familiar. Yet a change in playing style and having found a new sense of attacking rugby, Sarries stopped the rot with a 58–15 drubbing of struggling Newcastle. From then on, they went on to win four out of the five matches played, including impressive wins away to Sale, Northampton and table-topping Leicester Tigers.

This drastic change in form secured Saracens' Guinness Premiership semi-final spot in 3rd place, and they now faced Northampton Saints the fifth time this season, away at Franklin's Gardens, looking to end a streak of six semi-final losses in all competitions in the last three years. Saracens defeated Northampton 21–19, with Glen Jackson ensuring that Sarries reached their first final since 1998 with a late kick, converting Schalk Brits's driving-maul try.

The 2010 Guinness Premiership Final at Twickenham pitted Saracens against the eight-time and reigning English champions, Leicester Tigers. Leicester won 33–27 with a late try by Dan Hipkiss providing the difference after Saracens flyhalf Glen Jackson had kicked what looked to be the winning penalty with only a few minutes left. Heartbreak for Sarries and their fans, but it just wasn't to be a fairy-tale ending to their season.

The final also marked the last match for a number of players, including Fabio Ongaro, Matías Agüero, former All Black Justin Marshall, and loyal fly-half Glen Jackson.

==== 2010–11: Premiership champions ====
Saracens opened the 2010–11 season with a loss to London Irish in the opener of the London Double Header at Twickenham. Following the loss, their form improved as they ran off four wins in succession before a shock loss to Premiership newcomers Exeter Chiefs. They crashed out of the Heineken Cup in the pool stage, finishing bottom of a tough pool that featured Leinster, the ultimate Heineken Cup winners, and Clermont and Racing Métro, both of which made the French semi-finals. Saracens' domestic form, however, proved much stronger; they secured a home semi-final with one league match left, defeating Harlequins on the final day to complete a run of ten straight victories, including away at Northampton, Wasps, Exeter and Leicester Tigers. In the regular season Saracens won more games than any other side −18 in total – only missing out on top spot in the league because of the bonus point system. Gloucester awaited the Men in Black in the Semi-Final at Vicarage Road. A nervy finish and a late penalty from young flyhalf Owen Farrell gave Sarries the 12–10 win they wanted to reach their second successive Premiership Final.

In the Final, they again faced Leicester Tigers in a dramatic encounter. Saracens dominated the first half, leading 16–9 at half-time thanks to a James Short try, and showed a strong defensive performance to keep out waves of Leicester attack. This culminated in a nine-minute period of extra time during which they defended over 30 phases of Leicester assault through the forwards while leading 22–18, finally being awarded a penalty to crown them English champions for the first time and get revenge against Leicester for the previous year's final. Schalk Brits, who set up James Short's try, was awarded Man of the Match.

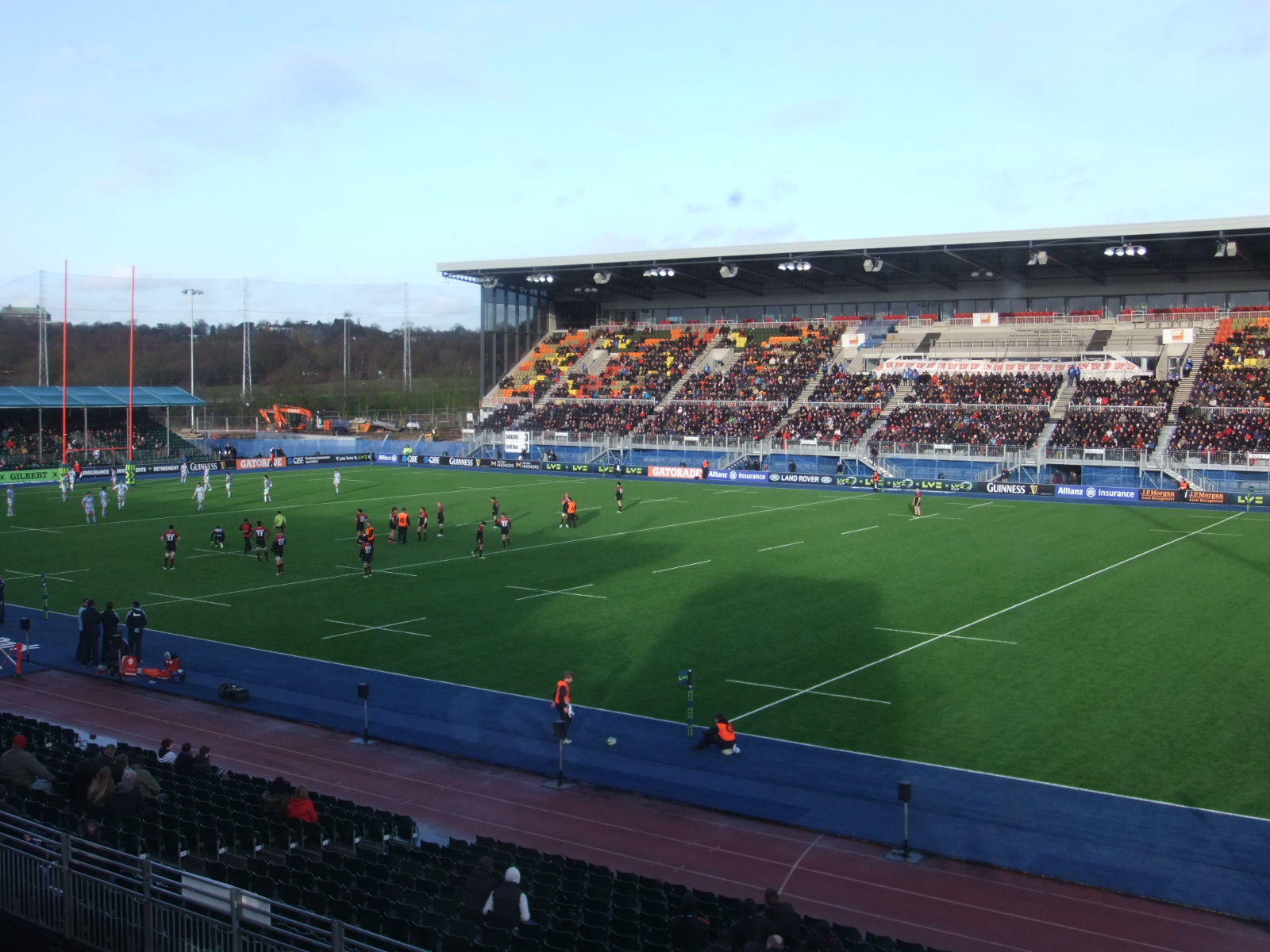
The redeveloped Copthall Stadium

Saracens also had one major off-field development during the season. Their landlord Watford FC activated a break clause in their groundshare deal, which at the time meant that Saracens needed a new home for the 2011–12 season. After looking at several venues in the area, Saracens announced on 10 November 2010 that it was in serious discussions with Barnet Borough Council about a move to the athletics stadium at the Barnet Copthall complex. Under the plan, Saracens would redevelop the stadium into a modern facility with 3,000 permanent seats and demountable stands to allow a rugby capacity of 10,000, and include the first artificial pitch in English rugby union.

Because of delays in the Barnet Copthall project, Saracens eventually reached an agreement with Watford to extend the groundshare at Vicarage Road for the 2011–12 season; the agreement covered at least 10 home matches that season.

==== 2014–15: Premiership champions ====
Saracens started the 2014–15 with high-scoring victories against London rivals Wasps and Harlequins, and went on to finish the regular season in fourth place, qualifying for the play-offs. After beating first-placed Northampton 29–24 in the semi-final, Saracens met Bath in the final. Saracens scored three unanswered tries in the first half, and went on to win the game 28–16, becoming the first team to become Premiership champions from a fourth-place finish. They made it a double, with a 23–20 win against Exeter in the final of the Anglo-Welsh Cup, a last minute penalty from Ben Spencer claiming Saracen's second Cup win.

In the first iteration of the European Rugby Champions Cup Saracens made it to the Semi-Finals before losing to ASM Clermont. In the boardroom, CEO Edward Griffiths departed and was replaced by Heath Harvey, a former director at Club Wembley.

==== 2019 – Relegation ====
In March 2019, allegations first emerged that Saracens might have broken Premiership Rugby's salary cap. Saracens chairman Nigel Wray had been investing in companies alongside players such as Richard Wigglesworth, Mako Vunipola, Billy Vunipola and Maro Itoje. In June, Premiership Rugby announced that they would hold an investigation into Saracens.

In November 2019, they were found to have been in breach of the salary cap regulations due to failure to disclose player payments in the 2016–17, 2017–18 and 2018–19 seasons, which would have taken them over the £7 million senior player salary cap. They were handed a 35-point deduction for the 2019–20 Premiership Rugby season and fined £5.3 million. The judgement found that Saracens had been reckless in entering into the arrangements with players without disclosing them to Premiership Rugby.

On 2 January 2020 Chairman Nigel Wray stood down and former chief executive officer Edward Griffiths returned to the role he left in 2015 with Mittesh Velani moving into a consultancy position. Wray was replaced as Saracens' Chairman by Neil Golding on 9 January 2020.

On 18 January 2020, Premiership Rugby announced that Saracens would be relegated to the RFU Championship for the 2020–21 season. Premiership Rugby CEO Darren Childs said this punishment was due to Saracens' lack of cooperation in a mid-season audit to prove compliance in the 2019–20 season.

After pressure from Premiership Rugby and the media Lord Dyson's full report into Saracens' spending was published on 23 January 2020, it revealed the overspend was £1.1m in 2016–17, £98,000 in 2017–18 and £906,000 in 2018–19. These included £923,947.63 of property investments between Nigel Wray and three unnamed Saracens' players. It also included Saracens' claim that the Salary Cap was unenforceable under competition law; this defence was rejected.

On 28 January 2020, Griffiths resigned as CEO after less than a month in charge and Premiership Rugby applied a further 70-point deduction for the 2019–20 season to ensure Saracens would finish bottom of the league table.

In February 2025, The Telegraph reported that the impartial expert advice about Saracens was provided by the auditors of another Premiership club, without highlighting the conflict of interest, despite their client then benefiting from the subsequent fine.

==== 2020/21 season ====
The 2020/21 rugby season was a successful one for Saracens, who won the RFU Championship and were promoted back to the Gallagher Premiership. The club finished the regular season top of the table, winning 10 of their 11 matches. They then defeated Ealing Trailfinders in the play-off final to secure promotion. Their 2020/21 highlights included a 73–0 victory over Coventry and 117–15 victory over Ealing Trailfinders in the play-off final.

==== 2021/22 season ====
Saracens finished the 2021/22 season as runners-up in the Gallagher Premiership. They lost the Premiership final to Leicester Tigers. Standout players included Maro Itoje, Owen Farrell, and Alex Goode.

== Stadium and training facilities ==
The current Saracens home ground is Barnet Copthall Stadium (currently known as the StoneX Stadium for sponsorship reasons) in Hendon, North London. The club has been based at the venue since January 2013, when it was then named Allianz Park. In partnership with National League 2 East club Old Albanians, Saracens currently operates its main training base at Woollams in St Albans.

Prior to the relocation to Barnet Copthall, Saracens spent 16 years at Vicarage Road, having maintained a groundshare agreement with professional football club Watford between 1997 and 2013. Before that, the club called Bramley Road its home for more than 50 years, through to the advent of professionalism.

=== Showpiece fixtures ===
Between 2004 and 2017, Saracens played select home matches at Twickenham Stadium, as part of the London Double Header, a marquee occasion held during the autumn of each Premiership season, involving London-based clubs. In addition, the club has hosted its own annual showpiece fixture – formerly branded as 'Derby Day' and now known as 'The Showdown' – at large high-capacity stadiums since 2009. To date, this game has taken place at Wembley Stadium, London Stadium and, currently, Tottenham Hotspur Stadium.

=== International relations and overseas matches ===
In the summer of 2013, Saracens played two international matches. They beat the South African Barbarians on 16 May at Artillery Ground. They toured the Atlantic Ocean island Bermuda to promote rugby. They visited a number of schools, ran coaching workshops and engaged in fundraising activities while on tour. To finish, they played a Bermuda International Select XV, which included Simon Taylor, Mike Scholz, Zach Pangelinan, Shaun Perry and Gcobani Bobo who are all internationally capped. The side was coached by former England international Lewis Moody and captained by former Ireland player Geordan Murphy.

On 12 March 2016, Saracens' away Premiership match against London Irish was held at the Red Bull Arena in the U.S. state of New Jersey. This was the first time a Premiership match had taken place overseas. Saracens won by a score of 26–16. The club then returned to the United States when they were hosted by the Newcastle Falcons on 16 September 2017, at the Talen Energy Stadium in Philadelphia. Saracens won by a score of 29–7.

On 27 November 2022, Saracens hosted Tel Aviv Heat at StoneX Stadium in North London, marking the first fixture between a Premiership Rugby club and an Israeli rugby team. Formed in March 2021, Tel Aviv Heat travelled to the United Kingdom by invitation and, in what was described as a “famous win,” secured a 29–26 victory over Saracens.

== Playing kit ==
The Saracens playing kit is currently supplied by British sportswear manufacturer Castore, as of the beginning of the 2021–22 season. The club's principal partner and primary shirt sponsor is American financial services company StoneX. The replica kit features the logo of the Saracens Foundation, a charity operated by the club and £5 of proceeds from each jersey are donated to the foundation.

=== Recent kit designs ===
The following graphics represent the designs of the Saracens playing kit between 2006 and 2017:

Home: 2006–2009	Home: 2009–2012	Home: 2012–2014	Home: 2014–2015	Home: 2015–2016	Home: 2016–2017

Away: 2006–2009	Away: 2009–2012	Away: 2012–2014	Away: 2014–2015	Away: 2015–2016	Away: 2016–2017

=== Summary of kit manufacturers and sponsors ===
The following organisations have manufactured and sponsored the Saracens playing kit since the 1996–97 season:

Season	Manufacturer	Lead sponsor
1996–1997	(United Kingdom) Cotton Oxford	(United Kingdom) Pinnacle Insurance
1997–1998	(United Kingdom) Cotton Oxford	(Japan) Kenwood
1998–1999	(United Kingdom) Cotton Oxford	(Japan) Kenwood
1999–2000	(United Kingdom) Cotton Oxford	(Japan) Kenwood
2000–2001	(New Zealand) Canterbury	(Japan) Kenwood
2001–2002	(New Zealand) Canterbury	(Germany) UniBond
2002–2003	(United States) Reebok	(Germany) UniBond
2003–2004	(United States) Reebok	(Germany) UniBond
2004–2005	(Australia) KooGa	(United Kingdom) Man Financial
2005–2006	(Australia) KooGa	(United Kingdom) Man Financial
2006–2007	(Australia) KooGa	(United Kingdom) Man Financial
2007–2008	(Australia) KooGa	(United Kingdom) Man Financial

Season	Manufacturer	Lead sponsor
2008–2009	(Australia) KooGa	(United States) MF Global
2009–2010	(Australia) KooGa	(United States) MF Global
2010–2011	(United States) Nike	(Switzerland) Garmin
2011–2012	(United States) Nike	(Switzerland) Garmin
2012–2013	(United States) Nike	(Germany) Allianz
2013–2014	(United States) Nike	(Germany) Allianz
2014–2015	(United States) Nike	(Germany) Allianz
2015–2016	(United States) Nike	(Germany) Allianz
2016–2017	(Australia) BLK	(Germany) Allianz
2017–2018	(Australia) BLK	(Germany) Allianz
2018–2019	(United States) Nike	(Germany) Allianz
2019–2020	(United States) Nike	(Germany) Allianz

Season	Manufacturer	Lead sponsor
2020–2021	(United States) Nike	(United Kingdom) City Index
2021–2022	(United Kingdom) Castore	(United Kingdom) City Index
2022–2023	(United Kingdom) Castore	(United Kingdom) City Index
2023–2024	(United Kingdom) Castore	(United Kingdom) City Index
2024–2025	(United Kingdom) Castore	(United States) StoneX
2025–2026	(United Kingdom) Castore	(United States) StoneX
2026–2027	(United Kingdom) Castore	(United Kingdom) PensionBee

== Club honours ==
=== Saracens F.C. ===
- Premiership Rugby
  - Champions: (6) 2010–11, 2014–15, 2015–16, 2017–18, 2018–19, 2022–23
  - Runners–Up: (4) 1997–98, 2009–10, 2013–14, 2021–22
- Champ Rugby
  - Champions: (3) 1988–89, 1994–95, 2020–21
- European Rugby Champions Cup
  - Champions: (3) 2015–16, 2016–17, 2018–19
  - Runners–Up: (1) 2013–14
- RFU Knockout Cup
  - Champions: (1) 1997–98
- Anglo–Welsh Cup
  - Champions: (1) 2014–15
- Premiership Rugby Cup
  - Runners–Up: (1) 2018–19
- Middlesex Senior Cup
  - Champions: (4) 1971–72, 1975–76, 1979–80, 1985–86
  - Runners–Up: (3) 1974–75, 1977–78, 1980–81

=== Saracens Storm ===
- Premiership Rugby Shield
  - Champions: (2) 2014–15, 2018–19
  - Runners-Up: (1) 2012–13

=== Saracens Sevens ===
- Premiership Rugby Sevens Series
  - Champions: (3) 2010, 2018, 2019
  - Runners–Up: (1) 2011
- Melrose Sevens
  - Champions: (2) 2012, 2013
- London City Sevens
  - Runners–Up: (1) 2025

== Current squad ==
=== Senior squad ===
The Saracens senior squad for the 2026–27 season is:

Saracens 2026–27 Premiership Rugby squad
**Props**: (England) Harvey Beaton; (England) Phil Brantingham; (Wales) **Rhys Carré**; (England) Alec Clarey; (Fiji) **Eroni Mawi**; (Fiji) **Vilikesa Nairau**; (England) Marcus Street; (Samoa) **Tietie Tuimauga**; (South Africa) Corné Weilbach; **Hookers**: (Ireland) Eoghan Clarke; (England) **Theo Dan**; (England) **Jamie George** (Note: Jamie George is jointly contracted with the RFU, via an enhanced England Elite Player Squad (EPS) contract.); (England) James Hadfield; **Locks**: (England) **Nick Isiekwe**; (England) **Maro Itoje** **(c)** (Note: Maro Itoje is jointly contracted with the RFU, via an enhanced England Elite Player Squad (EPS) contract.); (England) **George Martin** (Note: George Martin is jointly contracted with the RFU, via an enhanced England Elite Player Squad (EPS) contract.); (England) Olamide Sodeke; (England) Kennedy Sylvester; (England) Hugh Tizard	**Back row**: (England) Alfie Barbeary; (England) **Ben Earl** (Note: Ben Earl is jointly contracted with the RFU, via an enhanced England Elite Player Squad (EPS) contract.); (England) Max Eke; (Argentina) **Juan Martín González**; (England) Toby Knight; (England) Nathan Michelow; (Scotland) **Andy Onyeama-Christie**; **Scrum-halves**: (England) Charlie Bracken; (England) Tom James; (Wales) **Tomos Williams**; **Fly-halves**: (Scotland) **Fergus Burke**; (England) **Owen Farrell**	**Centres**: (Argentina) **Lucio Cinti**; (England) Olly Hartley; (England) Angus Hall; (Wales) **Nick Tompkins**; (Tonga) Sione Va'enuku; **Wings**: (England) Jack Bracken; (England) **Noah Caluori**; (England) Tobias Elliott; (England) Rotimi Segun; **Fullbacks**: (England) **Elliot Daly**; (England) **Max Malins**
**(c)** denotes the team captain. **Bold** denotes internationally capped players. Source:

=== Academy squad ===
The Saracens academy squad for the 2026–27 season is:

Saracens 2026–27 Senior Academy squad
**Props**: (England) Tom Dargan; (England) Alan Poku; (England) Gabriel Registe; (Scotland) Alex O'Driscoll; **Hookers**: (England) Tiane Elone; (England) James Isaacs; **Locks**: (England) Tayo Adegbemile; (England) Mathis Dehauteur; (England) Freddie Jones; (England) Jack Murphy	**Back row**: (England) Reggie Hammick; (England) Ediz Karsak; (England) Patrick Ludlow; (Scotland) Jack Marshall; (England) Charlie West; **Scrum-halves**: (England) Henry Hodgson; (Scotland) Asa Stewart-Harris; **Fly-halves**: (England) Luke Davidson; (England) Patrick Keaveney	**Centres**: (England) Alex Mason; (England) Fraser Rawlins; (England) Oscar Wilson; **Wings**: (England) Zac Finch; (England) Seva Kava; **Fullbacks**: (England) Finn Keylock; (England) Ben Morrow
Italics denotes U20 international. Source:

== Club staff ==
=== Coaching and ownership structure ===
The current Saracens senior management and coaching staff, as of the 2026–27 season, is as follows:

Coaches
Role	Name
Director of Rugby	(South Africa) Brendan Venter
Head Coach	(England) Joe Shaw
Forwards Coach	(England) Ian Peel
Attack Coach	(Wales) Dai Flanagan
Defence Coach	(England) Adam Powell
Kicking Coach / Physio	(Australia) Dan Vickers
Assistant Forwards Coach	(England) Rob Webber
Assistant Backs Coach	(England) James Tirrell
Academy Manager	(England) Mike Hynard
Academy Head Coach	(Scotland) Duncan Taylor
Academy Coaches	(England) Richard Barrington (England) Alex Goode (Scotland) Sean Maitland
Head of S&C	(France) Vincent Giacobbi
S&C Coach	(England) Nathan Smith
Head of Sports Science	(England) Tom Sherriff
Head of Academy S&C	(England) Kevin Barrett
Academy S&C Coach	(England) Simon Webster
Pathway Coordinator	(England) Chris Bajak
Pathway Coach	(England) Steve McNamara

Support Staff
Role	Name
Technical Director	(Ireland) Mark McCall
Team Manager	(South Africa) Warrick Lang
Head of Rugby Operations	(England) Will Crowley-Johnson
Head of Player Recruitment	(England) Nick Kennedy
Head of Psychology	(England) David Jones
Head of Analysis	(England) Matthew Wells
Senior Analyst	(England) Louis Bodrozic
Assistant Analyst	(England) Tommy Fuller
Head of Medical Services	(England) Laura Tulloch
First-Team Physios	(England) Amy Russell (England) Joel Teiger (Australia) Daniella Thrassis
Stadium Manager	(England) Alex MacIntyre
Equipment Manager	(England) Andy Dawling
Head of Content	(England) Ryan Walters
Communications Manager	(England) Oli Shapley

Executives
Role	Name
Club Owner	(England) Dominic Silvester
Club Chairman	(England) Neil Golding
Chief Executive Officer	(South Africa) Ed Coetzee
Chief Operating Officer	(Italy) Emanuele Palladino
Board of Directors	(England) Neil Barlow (England) Sonia Green (England) Victor Luck (Ireland) Paul O'Shea (South Africa) Francois Pienaar (England) Kamal Shah
Chief Growth Officer	(England) Mike Leslie
Finance Director	(England) Kerrie Evans
Commercial Manager	(England) Adam Anzani-Jones
Head of Partnerships	(England) Emily Marshall
Head of Sales	(England) Mike Godfrey
Events Director	(England) Dominie Bradshaw
HR Director	(England) Sahra Kirk

=== Timeline of coaches (professional era) ===
The following coaches have held the lead coaching role (either director of rugby or head coach) for the Saracens senior team since the beginning of the professional rugby union era:

Name	From	To	Honours	Notes
(South Africa) Francois Pienaar	July; 1997	May; 2002	* 1998 Tetley's Bitter Cup winner (as player-coach) * 1998 Premiership runner-up (as player-coach)	* Also Saracens player 1997–2000, chief executive 2000–02 * Current Saracens co-owner/board member * Former South Africa captain * 1995 Rugby World Cup champion
(New Zealand) Wayne Shelford	June; 2002	July; 2003	—	* Former New Zealand captain * 1987 Rugby World Cup champion
(Australia) Rod Kafer	August; 2003	December; 2004	—	* Also Saracens player 2003 * 1999 Rugby World Cup champion
(England) Steve Diamond	December; 2004	February; 2006	—	* Sale first-team coach 2001–02, director of rugby 2012–20 * Worcester lead rugby consultant 2021–22, director of rugby 2022 * Newcastle director of rugby 2024–25
(Australia) Eddie Jones (interim)	February; 2006	May; 2006	—	* Caretaker director of rugby * Also Saracens technical advisor 2006, 2007–08
(Australia) Alan Gaffney	June; 2006	May; 2008	* Premiership Coach of the Year finalist (2007)	* Munster director of rugby 2002–05 * Leinster and Ireland backs coach 2009–11 * Northampton director of rugby 2017–18
(Australia) Eddie Jones	June; 2008	March; 2009	—	* Australia head coach 2001–05, 2023 (2003 World Cup finalist) * South Africa technical advisor 2007 (2007 World Cup champion) * Japan head coach 2012–15, 2024– * England head coach 2016–2022 (2019 World Cup finalist)
(Australia) Richard Graham (interim)	March; 2009	May; 2009	—	* Caretaker head coach * Also Saracens assistant coach 2006–09
(South Africa) Brendan Venter	June; 2009	January; 2011	* 2011 Premiership winner (ended season as technical director) * 2010 Premiership runner-up	* Also Saracens technical director 2011–15, rugby consultant 2022–26 * 1995 Rugby World Cup champion * London Irish player-coach 2001–03, technical director 2016–18 * Italy technical advisor 2016, defence coach 2017–19
(Ireland) Mark McCall	January; 2011	June; 2026	* Six-time Premiership winner (2011, 2015, 2016, 2018, 2019, 2023) * Three-time European Champions Cup winner (2016, 2017, 2019) * Five-time Premiership Coach of the Year (2013, 2014, 2016, 2019, 2023) * 2015 LV Cup winner * 2021 RFU Championship winner * Two-time Premiership runner-up (2014, 2022) * Four-time Premiership Coach of the Year finalist (2017, 2018, 2022, 2024) * 2014 Heineken Cup runner-up * 2019 Premiership Rugby Cup runner-up	* Also Saracens first-team coach 2009–11, technical director 2026– * Ireland A and Ireland Under-21s first-team coach 1999–2001 * Ulster backs coach 1999–2004, director of rugby 2004–07 * Castres backs coach 2007–08
(South Africa) Brendan Venter	July; 2026	present	—	* First person to hold permanent Saracens lead coach role twice

=== Notable coaches ===
The following former Saracens players and assistant coaches have gone on to serve in high-profile positions at international level, at other top-flight clubs in major domestic leagues – including the English Premiership, the French Top 14 and the United Rugby Championship – or in other professional sports:

- Mike Ford (defence coach 2004–05, head coach 2005–06)
  - England defence coach 2006–11
  - British Lions defence coach 2005
  - Bath backs coach 2012–13, director of rugby 2013–16
  - Toulon head coach 2016–17; Leicester defence coach 2019–21
- Andy Farrell (player 2005–09, backs coach 2009–11, head coach 2011–12)
  - England defence coach 2012–15
  - British Lions defence coach 2013 & 2017, head coach 2025
  - Ireland defence coach 2016–19, head coach 2019–
- Paul Gustard (player 2006–08, senior coach 2008–09, defence coach 2009–16)
  - England defence coach 2016–18
  - Harlequins director of rugby 2018–21; Benetton defence coach 2021–22
  - Stade Français defence coach 2022–24, head coach 2024–
- (England) Al Sanderson (player 2004–05, forwards coach 2008–16, head coach 2016–21)
  - Sale director of rugby 2021–
- Steve Borthwick (player/captain 2008–14, academy coach 2012–14)
  - Japan forwards coach 2014–15; England forwards coach 2016–20
  - British Lions forwards coach 2017
  - Leicester director of rugby 2020–22
  - England head coach 2022–
- (Scotland) Kelly Brown (player 2010–17, academy coach 2016–20, lineout coach 2021–23)
  - Canada defence coach 2017
  - Glasgow assistant coach 2020–21
- Richard Wigglesworth (player 2010–20, academy coach 2017–20)
  - Canada defence and kicking coach 2019
  - Leicester attack and kicking coach 2021–22, interim head coach 2022–23
  - England attack coach 2023–24, assistant head coach 2024–
  - British Lions assistant coach 2025
- Richard Hill (player 1993–2008, academy coach 2010–13)
  - England team manager 2016–
- Mosese Rauluni (player 2004–10, academy coach 2010–12)
  - Fiji backs coach 2011, defence and skills coach 2014–17
  - Fiji women's and Fijiana Drua head coach 2024
- Mark Mapletoft (player 1999–2000, academy coach 2005–07)
  - RFU academy coach 2007–10, pathway coach 2020–23
  - Harlequins attack and backs coach 2010–20
  - England Under-20s head coach 2023–24; England A head coach 2024–
- (Ireland) Phil Morrow (head of strength and conditioning 2011–13, performance director 2013–25)
  - British Lions S&C coach 2017
  - England athletic performance director 2025–
- Andy Edwards (strength and conditioning coach 2006–20)
  - England A fitness coach 2010–16
  - South Africa athletic performance director 2020–
- (Wales) Paul Turner (player 1999, backs coach 1999)
  - Gloucester assistant coach 2001–02; Harlequins backs coach 2002–05
  - Dragons head coach 2005–11; Wasps attack and skills coach 2011–12
- (England) Donald Barrell (academy coach 2008–12, academy director 2012–17)
  - RFU head of academies 2017–22, head of performance pathways 2020–24
- Simon Raiwalui (player 2003–07, captain 2003–04/2006–07)
  - Racing 92 forwards coach 2012–13, team manager 2013–14
  - Stade Français assistant coach 2014–17; Biarritz assistant coach 2017–18
  - Australia assistant coach 2018–20
  - Fiji team manager 2020–23, head coach 2023
- George Kruis (player 2009–20)
  - England lineout coach 2023
- (South Africa) Petrus du Plessis (player 2009–17)
  - Glasgow scrum coach 2019–20; Australia scrum coach 2020–23
  - Leicester scrum coach 2023; Kobelco Steelers scrum consultant 2023–
- (England) Mouritz Botha (player 2009–15, women's forwards and defence coach 2023–)
  - Germany forwards and defence coach 2018–19
  - Belgium forwards coach 2023
- Thibault Giroud (player 2003–04, strength and conditioning coach 2003–04)
  - Pau S&C coach 2004–05; London Broncos S&C coach 2005–07
  - Celtic Crusaders S&C coach 2007–09; Biarritz S&C coach 2009–14
  - Glasgow S&C coach 2016–17; Toulon S&C coach 2017–19
  - France athletic performance director 2019–23
- Ian Vass (academy coach 2013–17)
  - England Under-20s head coach 2017; Montpellier defence coach 2017–20
  - Northampton defence coach 2020–23; Clermont kicking coach 2023–
- David Priestley (head of psychology and personal development 2008–14)
  - Arsenal head of psychology and personal development 2014–20
  - Leicester psychologist 2020–23; England psychologist 2023–
- Ross Hamilton (performance analyst 2012–14, talent profile specialist 2013–14)
  - England performance analyst 2014–18

== Notable players ==
=== Rugby World Cup ===
The following players have been selected to represent their national teams at the Rugby World Cup while at Saracens:

Tournament winners are listed in bold

Tournament	Host nation	Number selected	England players	Other national team players
1999	Wales	9	Kyran Bracken, Danny Grewcock, Richard Hill, Dan Luger	Scott Murray, Robbie Russell (Scotland)
1999	Wales	9	Kyran Bracken, Danny Grewcock, Richard Hill, Dan Luger	Paul Wallace (Ireland)
1999	Wales	9	Kyran Bracken, Danny Grewcock, Richard Hill, Dan Luger	Roberto Grau (Argentina)
1999	Wales	9	Kyran Bracken, Danny Grewcock, Richard Hill, Dan Luger	Brendan Reidy (Samoa)
2003	Australia	7	**Kyran Bracken**, **Richard Hill**	Jared Barker, Morgan Williams (Canada)
2003	Australia	7	**Kyran Bracken**, **Richard Hill**	Robbie Russell (Scotland)
2003	Australia	7	**Kyran Bracken**, **Richard Hill**	Tom Shanklin (Wales)
2003	Australia	7	**Kyran Bracken**, **Richard Hill**	Nicky Little (Fiji)
2007	France	5	Andy Farrell	Kameli Ratuvou, Mosese Rauluni (c) (Fiji)
2007	France	5	Andy Farrell	Census Johnston (Samoa)
2007	France	5	Andy Farrell	Fabio Ongaro (Italy)
2011	New Zealand	8	Matt Stevens, Richard Wigglesworth	Hayden Smith, Chris Wyles (United States)
2011	New Zealand	8	Matt Stevens, Richard Wigglesworth	Kelly Brown (Scotland)
2011	New Zealand	8	Matt Stevens, Richard Wigglesworth	John Smit (c) (South Africa)
2011	New Zealand	8	Matt Stevens, Richard Wigglesworth	Jacques Burger (c) (Namibia)
2011	New Zealand	8	Matt Stevens, Richard Wigglesworth	Michael Tagicakibau (Fiji)
2015	England	18	Brad Barritt, Owen Farrell, Jamie George, Alex Goode, George Kruis, Billy Vunipola, Mako Vunipola, Richard Wigglesworth	Titi Lamositele, Thretton Palamo, Hayden Smith, Chris Wyles (c) (United States)
2015	England	18	Brad Barritt, Owen Farrell, Jamie George, Alex Goode, George Kruis, Billy Vunipola, Mako Vunipola, Richard Wigglesworth	Marcelo Bosch, Juan Figallo (Argentina)
2015	England	18	Brad Barritt, Owen Farrell, Jamie George, Alex Goode, George Kruis, Billy Vunipola, Mako Vunipola, Richard Wigglesworth	Schalk Brits (South Africa)
2015	England	18	Brad Barritt, Owen Farrell, Jamie George, Alex Goode, George Kruis, Billy Vunipola, Mako Vunipola, Richard Wigglesworth	Jacques Burger (c) (Namibia)
2015	England	18	Brad Barritt, Owen Farrell, Jamie George, Alex Goode, George Kruis, Billy Vunipola, Mako Vunipola, Richard Wigglesworth	Samuela Vunisa (Italy)
2015	England	18	Brad Barritt, Owen Farrell, Jamie George, Alex Goode, George Kruis, Billy Vunipola, Mako Vunipola, Richard Wigglesworth	Cătălin Fercu (Romania)
2019	Japan	17	Elliot Daly, Owen Farrell (c), Jamie George, Maro Itoje, George Kruis, Jack Singleton, Ben Spencer, Billy Vunipola, Mako Vunipola	Sean Maitland, Duncan Taylor (Scotland)
2019	Japan	17	Elliot Daly, Owen Farrell (c), Jamie George, Maro Itoje, George Kruis, Jack Singleton, Ben Spencer, Billy Vunipola, Mako Vunipola	Rhys Carré, Liam Williams (Wales)
2019	Japan	17	Elliot Daly, Owen Farrell (c), Jamie George, Maro Itoje, George Kruis, Jack Singleton, Ben Spencer, Billy Vunipola, Mako Vunipola	**Vincent Koch**, **Damian Willemse** (South Africa)
2019	Japan	17	Elliot Daly, Owen Farrell (c), Jamie George, Maro Itoje, George Kruis, Jack Singleton, Ben Spencer, Billy Vunipola, Mako Vunipola	Juan Figallo (Argentina)
2019	Japan	17	Elliot Daly, Owen Farrell (c), Jamie George, Maro Itoje, George Kruis, Jack Singleton, Ben Spencer, Billy Vunipola, Mako Vunipola	Titi Lamositele (United States)
2023	France	13	Elliot Daly, Theo Dan, Ben Earl, Owen Farrell (c), Jamie George, Maro Itoje, Billy Vunipola	Lucio Cinti, Juan Martín González (Argentina)
2023	France	13	Elliot Daly, Theo Dan, Ben Earl, Owen Farrell (c), Jamie George, Maro Itoje, Billy Vunipola	Nick Tompkins (Wales)
2023	France	13	Elliot Daly, Theo Dan, Ben Earl, Owen Farrell (c), Jamie George, Maro Itoje, Billy Vunipola	Eroni Mawi (Fiji)
2023	France	13	Elliot Daly, Theo Dan, Ben Earl, Owen Farrell (c), Jamie George, Maro Itoje, Billy Vunipola	Theo McFarland (Samoa)
2023	France	13	Elliot Daly, Theo Dan, Ben Earl, Owen Farrell (c), Jamie George, Maro Itoje, Billy Vunipola	Marco Riccioni (Italy)

=== British and Irish Lions (British & Irish Lions) ===
The following players have been selected to represent the British & Irish Lions on tour while at Saracens:

Tour	Host nation	Series result	Number selected	Players selected	Notes
1997	South Africa	2–1	4	(England) Kyran Bracken (England) Tony Diprose (England) Richard Hill (Ireland) Paul Wallace	* Hill and Wallace featured in all three test squads. * Bracken and Diprose were later additions to the tour.
2001	Australia	1–2	4	(England) Danny Grewcock (England) Richard Hill (2) (England) Dan Luger (Scotland) Scott Murray	* Grewcock featured in all three test squads. * Hill started in the first two tests, before suffering a tour-ending injury.
2005	New Zealand	0–3	2	(Ireland) Shane Byrne (England) Richard Hill (3)	* Hill started in the first test, before suffering a tour-ending injury. * Byrne featured in the first and third tests.
2009	South Africa	1–2	0	No Saracens players were selected for the 2009 British and Irish Lions tour.	
2013	Australia	2–1	4	(England) Brad Barritt (England) Owen Farrell (England) Matt Stevens (England) Mako Vunipola	* Farrell and M. Vunipola featured in all three test squads. * Barritt was a later addition to the tour. * Stevens previously featured on the 2005 tour while playing for Bath.
2017	New Zealand	1–1–1	7	(England) Owen Farrell (2) (England) Jamie George (England) Maro Itoje (England) George Kruis (England) Billy Vunipola (England) Mako Vunipola (2) (Wales) Liam Williams	* Saracens was the most represented club on tour – a feat repeated in 2021. * M. Vunipola and B. Vunipola were the 10th pair of brothers selected for a Lions tour. * Farrell, George, Itoje, M. Vunipola and Williams featured in all three test squads. * Farrell was the top points scorer in both the test series and the tour overall. * Kruis started in the first test. * B. Vunipola pulled out of the tour following his selection, due to injury.
2021	South Africa	1–2	5	(England) Elliot Daly (England) Owen Farrell (3) (England) Jamie George (2) (England) Maro Itoje (2) (England) Mako Vunipola (3)	* Daly, Itoje and M. Vunipola featured in all three test squads. * Itoje was named the Lions Player of the Series. * M. Vunipola became England's most-capped Lions test player of the professional era. * Farrell featured in the first two test squads. * Daly previously featured on the 2017 tour while playing for Wasps.
2025	Australia	2–1	5	(England) Elliot Daly (2) (England) Ben Earl (England) Owen Farrell (4) (England) Jamie George (3) (England) Maro Itoje (3)	* Itoje was the first Saracens player to be appointed captain of a Lions tour. * Farrell and George were later additions to the tour. * Itoje started all three test matches as captain. * Earl featured in tests one and three, and Farrell featured in tests two and three. * Farrell became the first player to win two Lions series in the professional era.

=== Club captains ===
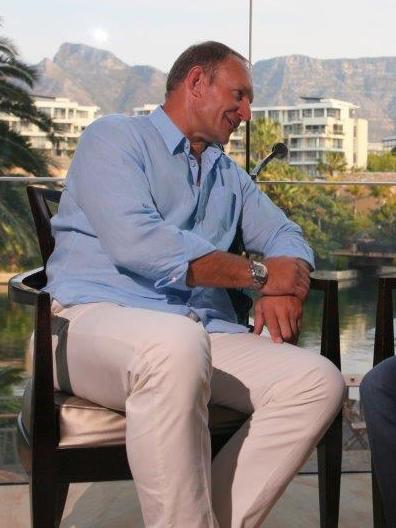
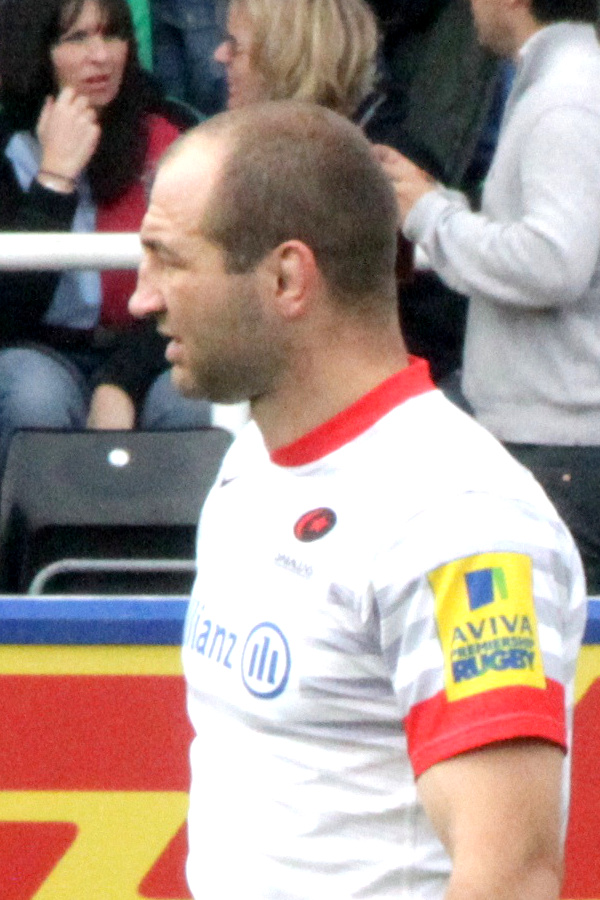
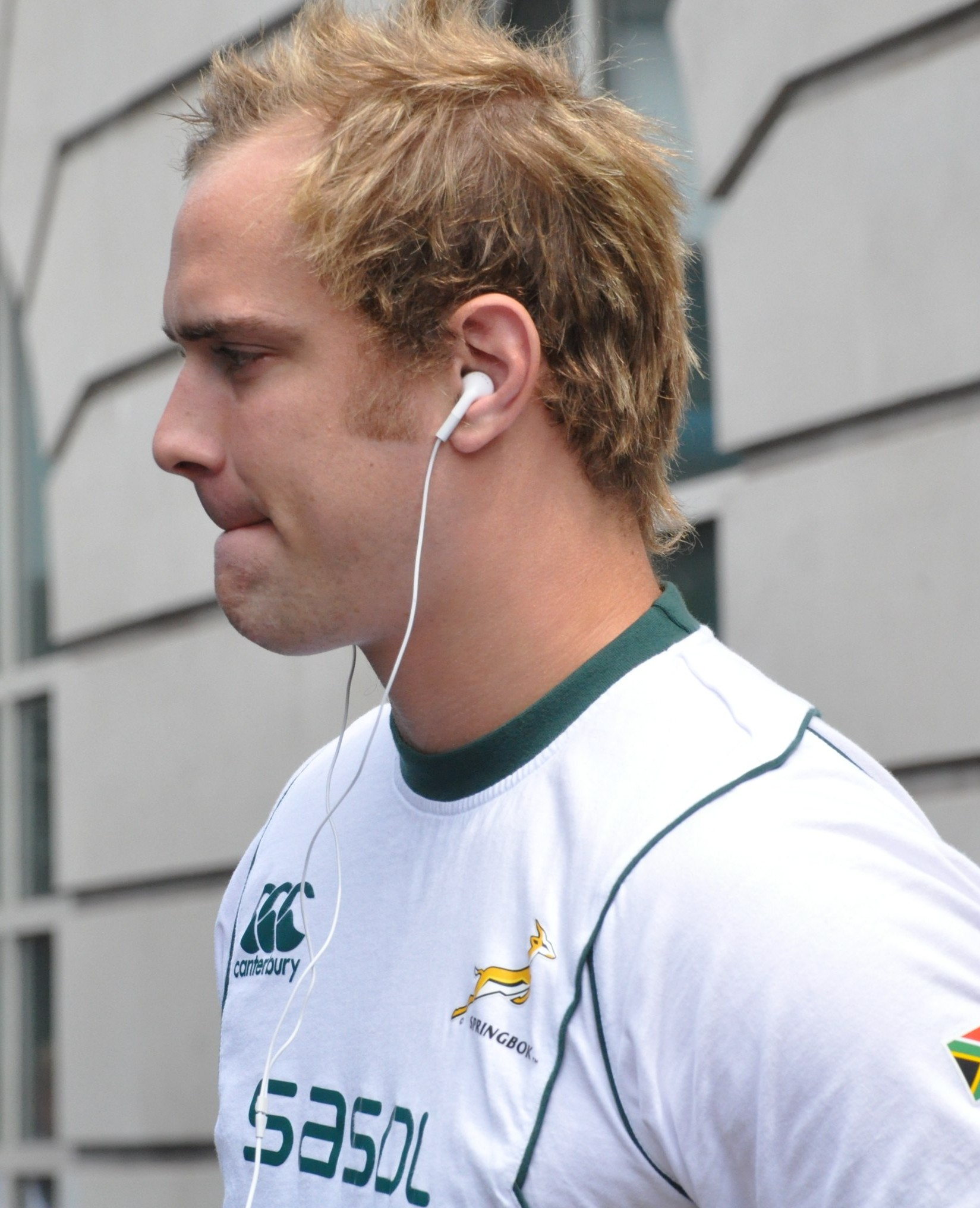
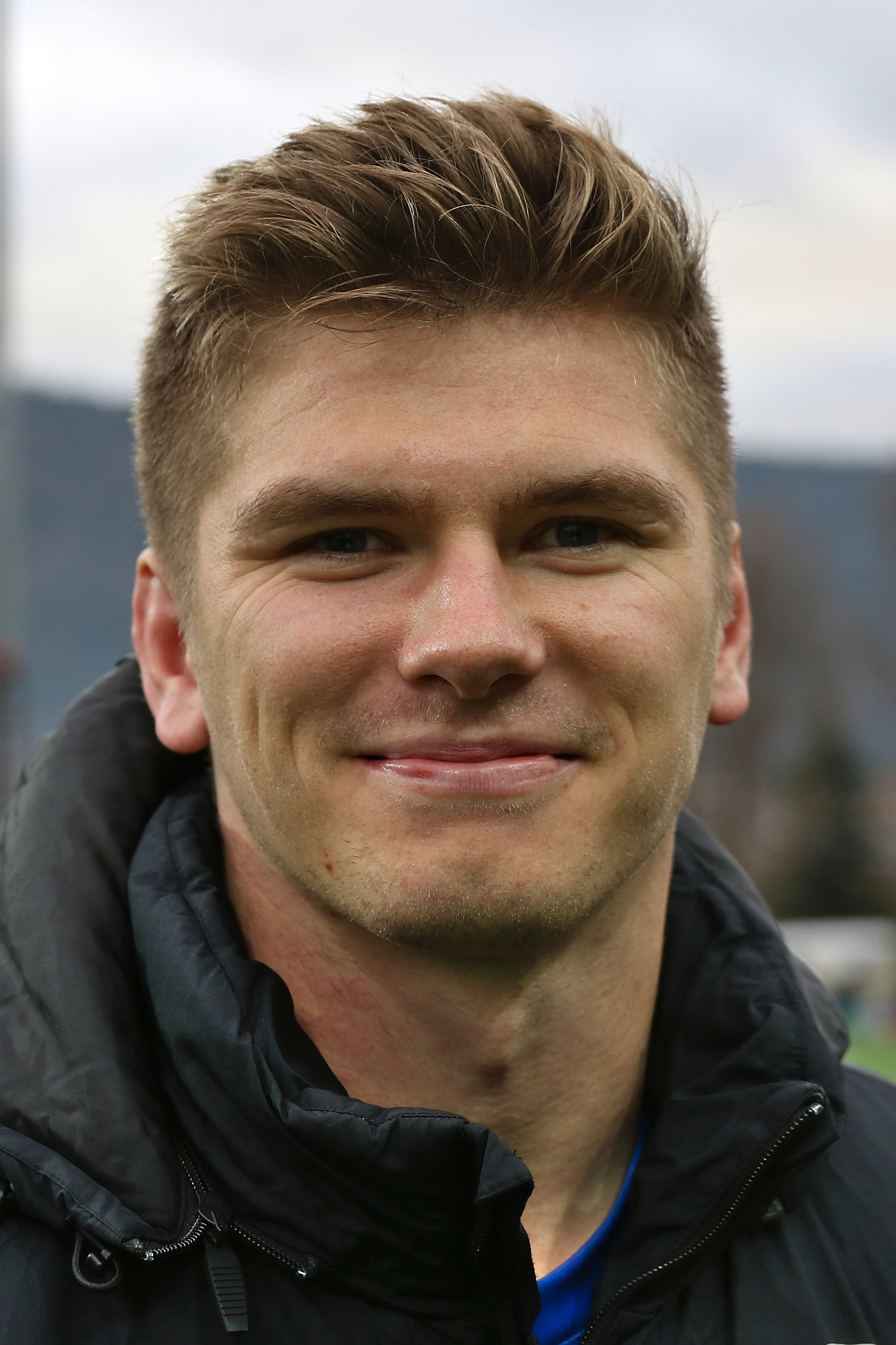
Top left: Francois Pienaar, the club's first overseas captain and player-coach.
Top right: Steve Borthwick, the captain for the club's first Premiership title win in 2011.
Bottom left: Al Hargreaves, the captain for the club's second Premiership title win in 2015.
Bottom right: Owen Farrell, the captain for the club's sixth Premiership title win in 2023.

The following players have held the position of Saracens club captain since 1876:

- 1876–1882 - (England) F. W. Dunn
- 1882–1887 - (England) A. Jenkins
- 1887–1890 - (England) G. Sparks
- 1890–1891 - (England) J. Bongard
- 1891–1893 - (England) H. E. Read
- 1893–1896 - (England) W. T. A. Beare
- 1896–1897 - (England) A. Warden
- 1897–1899 - (England) W. T. A. Beare
- 1899–1900 - (England) T. Sawyer
- 1900–1901 - (England) W. T. A. Beare
- 1901–1907 - (England) C. S. Bongard
- 1907–1909 - (England) J. W. Jennings
- 1909–1911 - (England) T. H. Pentony
- 1911–1912 - (England) W. A. Andrew
- 1912–1913 - (England) A. J. Wilson
- 1913–1914 - (England) D. McMillan
- 1919–1920 - (England) D. H. Keith
- 1920–1921 - (England) G. P. Mayne
- 1921–1922 - (England) F. S. Chaan
- 1922–1923 - (England) T. F. Pilcher
- 1923–1924 - (England) J. S. Greer
- 1924–1925 - (England) W. T. Williams
- 1925–1926 - (England) J. S. Greer
- 1926–1927 - (England) K. Brown
- 1927–1928 - (England) O. R. G. Williams
- 1928–1929 - (England) L. C. Johnson
- 1929–1930 - (England) W. L. Prosser
- 1930–1933 - (England) K. Brown
- 1933–1935 - (England) M. Barak
- 1935–1936 - (England) E. O. Furness
- 1936–1938 - (England) A. V. N. Bartlett
- 1938–1939 - (England) G. J. Burkle
- 1939–1940 - (England) P. Brown
- 1940–1946 - (England) E. Heptonstall
- 1946–1949 - (England) G. A. Turner
- 1949–1950 - (England) R. D. Bruce
- 1950–1952 - (England) L. W. Knowlson
- 1952–1954 - (England) R. D. Bruce
- 1954–1955 - (England) E. A. Eames
- 1955–1956 - (England) R. Robertson
- 1956–1957 - (England) V. S. J. Harding
- 1957–1958 - (England) D. J. Dowling
- 1958–1960 - (England) D. M. Thomas
- 1960–1962 - (England) K. J. Bartlett
- 1962–1965 - (England) J. A. D. Wyness
- 1965–1968 - (England) G. D. Hunt
- 1968–1970 - (England) R. Weaver
- 1970–1972 - (England) J. A. Lockwood
- 1972–1973 - (England) R. Headey
- 1973–1974 - (England) J. M. Heggadon
- 1974–1976 - (England) M. Williams
- 1976–1977 - (England) J. A. Lockwood
- 1977–1978 - (England) D. Harrigan
- 1978–1981 - (England) R. Faircloth
- 1981–1982 - (England) A. Harrower
- 1982–1983 - (England) F. Steadman
- 1983–1987 - (England) A. Keay
- 1987–1988 - (England) L. Adamson
- 1988–1990 - (England) F. Steadman
- 1990–1992 - (England) J. R. Buckton
- 1992–1996 - (England) B. Davies
- 1996–1999 - (England) T. Diprose
- 1999–2000 - (South Africa) J. F. Pienaar
- 2000–2001 - (England) K. P. P. Bracken
- 2001–2002 - (France) A. Benazzi
- 2002–2003 - (England) K. P. P. Bracken
- 2003–2004 - (Fiji) S. Raiwalui
- 2004–2006 - (England) H. D. Vyvyan
- 2006–2007 - (Fiji) S. Raiwalui
- 2007–2008 - (South Africa) N. de Kock
- 2008–2014 - (England) S. W. Borthwick
- 2014–2016 - (South Africa) A. J. Hargreaves
- 2016–2020 - (England) B. M. Barritt
- 2020–2024 - (England) O. A. O. Farrell
- 2024–present - (England) O. M. Itoje

== Personnel honours and records ==
=== Premiership Rugby ===
==== All-time statistical leaders ====
As of 31 October 2025

Appearances
Rank	Player	Games
1.	(England) Alex Goode	284
2.	(England) Jackson Wray	215
3.	(England) Jamie George	208
4.	(England) Brad Barritt	190
5.	(United States) Chris Wyles	181

Points
Rank	Player	Points
1.	(England) Owen Farrell	1,790
2.	(New Zealand) Glen Jackson	1,204
3.	(England) Charlie Hodgson	738
4.	(England) Alex Goode	677
5.	(England) Alex Lozowski	635

Tries
Rank	Player	Tries
1.	(United States) Chris Wyles	47
2.	(England) Chris Ashton	46
3.	(England) Jamie George	43
4.	(England) David Strettle	40
5.	(England) Alex Lewington	38

==== Player of the Year ====
The following Saracens players have been named the Premiership Player of the Year:

- (England) Alex Goode
  - (2015–16)
- (England) Ben Earl
  - (2021–22)
- (England) Tom Willis
  - (2025–26)

==== Young Player of the Year ====
The following Saracens players have been named the Premiership Young Player of the Year:

- (England) Owen Farrell
  - (2011–12)
- (England) Billy Vunipola
  - (2013–14)
- (England) Maro Itoje
  - (2015–16)
- (England) Noah Caluori
  - (2025–26)

==== Finals record ====
Saracens has competed in 9 Premiership finals in total, with a record of 6 wins and 3 losses.

Win Loss

29 May 2010	Leicester Tigers	33–27	Saracens	Twickenham, London
17:30 BST (UTC+01)	Try: Smith 13' c B. Youngs 27' c Hipkiss 76' c Con: Flood (3/3) 14', 28', 77'; Pen: Flood (4/6) 3', 19', 47', 57'	Report	Try: Joubert (2) 17' m, 49' c Con: Jackson (1/2) 50'; Pen: Jackson (5/6) 2', 9', 25', 70', 75'	Attendance: 81,600; Referee: Dave Pearson (RFU)
Leicester: Forwards – 1. Ayerza 2. Chuter 3. Castrogiovanni 4. L. Deacon 5. Parling 6. Croft 7. Moody 8. Crane; Backs – 9. B. Youngs 10. Flood 11. A. Tuilagi 12. Allen 13. Smith 14. Hamilton 15. Murphy (c); Substitutes – 16. Duffey 17. Stankovich 18. Cole 19. Newby 20. Woods 21. Grindal 22. Staunton 23. Hipkiss				Attendance: 81,600; Referee: Dave Pearson (RFU)
Saracens: Forwards – 1. Agüero 2. Brits 3. du Plessis 4. Borthwick (c) 5. Vyvyan 6. J. Burger 7. Saull 8. Joubert; Backs – 9. de Kock 10. Jackson 11. Wyles 12. Barritt 13. Powell 14. Tagicakibau 15. Goode; Substitutes – 16. Ongaro 17. Gill 18. Skuse 19. M. Botha 20. Melck 21. Marshall 22. Hougaard 23. Ratuvou

28 May 2011	Leicester Tigers	18–22	Saracens	Twickenham, London
15:00 BST (UTC+01)	Pen: Flood (6/8) 9', 18', 38', 49', 68', 74'; Cards: B. Youngs (yellow card) 5'	Report	Try: Short 28' c Con: Farrell (1/1) 29'; Pen: Farrell (5/5) 6', 20', 35', 43', 73'	Attendance: 80,016; Referee: Wayne Barnes (RFU)
Leicester: Forwards – 1. Ayerza 2. Chuter 3. Castrogiovanni 4. Mafi 5. Skivington 6. Croft 7. Newby (c) 8. Crane; Backs – 9. B. Youngs 10. Flood 11. A. Tuilagi 12. Allen 13. Smith 14. Agulla 15. S. Hamilton; Substitutes – 16. Hawkins 17. Stankovich 18. Cole 19. Slater 20. Waldrom 21. Grindal 22. Staunton 23. Twelvetrees				Attendance: 80,016; Referee: Wayne Barnes (RFU)
Saracens: Forwards – 1. Stevens 2. Brits 3. Nieto 4. Borthwick (c) 5. M. Botha 6. Brown 7. J. Burger 8. Joubert; Backs – 9. de Kock 10. Farrell 11. Short 12. Barritt 13. Wyles 14. Strettle 15. Goode; Substitutes – 16. George 17. Gill 18. du Plessis 19. Vyvyan 20. Saull 21. Wigglesworth 22. Mordt 23. Cato

31 May 2014	Saracens	20–24 (a.e.t.)	Northampton Saints	Twickenham, London
15:00 BST (UTC+01)	Try: Bosch 72' m Pen: Farrell (3/4) 11', 17', 44'; Hodgson (2/2) 85', 92'	Report	Try: Foden 31' c G. Pisi 58' c A. Waller 100' c Con: Myler (3/3) 32', 59', 100+1'; Pen: Myler (1/1) 83'	Attendance: 81,193; Referee: JP Doyle (RFU)
Saracens: Forwards – 1. Barrington 2. Brits 3. Stevens 4. Borthwick (c) 5. M. Botha 6. Brown 7. J. Burger 8. B. Vunipola; Backs – 9. de Kock 10. Farrell 11. Strettle 12. Barritt 13. Bosch 14. Ashton 15. Goode; Substitutes – 16. George 17. Gill 18. Johnston 19. Hargreaves 20. Wray 21. Wigglesworth 22. Hodgson 23. Wyles				Attendance: 81,193; Referee: JP Doyle (RFU)
Northampton: Forwards – 1. Corbisiero 2. Haywood 3. Ma'afu 4. Manoa 5. Lawes 6. Clark 7. Wood (c) 8. Dickinson; Backs – 9. Fotuali'i 10. Myler 11. North 12. Burrell 13. G. Pisi 14. K. Pisi 15. Foden; Substitutes – 16. Hartley 17. Waller 18. Mercey 19. C. Day 20. Dowson 21. Dickson 22. J. Wilson 23. Stephenson

30 May 2015	Bath	16–28	Saracens	Twickenham, London
14:30 BST (UTC+01)	Try: Joseph 51' c Con: Ford (1/1) 52'; Pen: Ford (3/3) 26', 44', 60'	Report	Try: Farrell 5' c George 13' m Wyles 31' c Con: Farrell (2/3) 6', 32'; Pen: Farrell (3/3) 21', 37', 62'	Attendance: 80,589; Referee: Wayne Barnes (RFU)
Bath: Forwards – 1. James 2. Batty 3. D. Wilson 4. Hooper (c) 5. Attwood 6. Burgess 7. Louw 8. Houston; Backs – 9. Stringer 10. Ford 11. Banahan 12. Eastmond 13. Joseph 14. Rokoduguni 15. Watson; Substitutes – 16. Webber 17. Auterac 18. Thomas 19. D. Day 20. Garvey 21. Fearns 22. Cook 23. Devoto				Attendance: 80,589; Referee: Wayne Barnes (RFU)
Saracens: Forwards – 1. M. Vunipola 2. George 3. du Plessis 4. Kruis 5. Hargreaves (c) 6. Itoje 7. J. Burger 8. B. Vunipola; Backs – 9. Wigglesworth 10. Farrell 11. Wyles 12. Barritt 13. Taylor 14. Strettle 15. Goode; Substitutes – 16. Brits 17. Barrington 18. Figallo 19. J. Hamilton 20. Wray 21. de Kock 22. Hodgson 23. Ashton

28 May 2016	Saracens	28–20	Exeter Chiefs	Twickenham, London
15:00 BST (UTC+01)	Try: Taylor 33' c Wyles 36' c Goode 75' m Con: Farrell (2/2) 34', 37'; Pen: Farrell (3/3) 2', 9', 26'	Report	Try: Yeandle 52' c Nowell 72' c Con: Steenson (2/2) 53', 73'; Pen: Steenson (2/2) 22', 40'	Attendance: 77,109; Referee: Wayne Barnes (RFU)
Saracens: Forwards – 1. M. Vunipola 2. Brits 3. du Plessis 4. Itoje 5. Kruis 6. Rhodes 7. Fraser 8. B. Vunipola; Backs – 9. Wigglesworth 10. Farrell 11. Wyles 12. Barritt (c) 13. Taylor 14. Ashton 15. Goode; Substitutes – 16. George 17. Barrington 18. Figallo 19. Hamilton 20. Wray 21. de Kock 22. Hodgson 23. Bosch				Attendance: 77,109; Referee: Wayne Barnes (RFU)
Exeter: Forwards – 1. Moon 2. Cowan-Dickie 3. H. Williams 4. Lees 5. Parling 6. Ewers 7. Salvi (c) 8. Armand; Backs – 9. Chudley 10. Steenson 11. Woodburn 12. Whitten 13. Slade 14. Nowell 15. Dollman; Substitutes – 16. Yeandle 17. Hepburn 18. Francis 19. Welch 20. Horstmann 21. Lewis 22. Campagnaro 23. Short

26 May 2018	Exeter Chiefs	10–27	Saracens	Twickenham, London
15:00 BST (UTC+01)	Try: Steenson 63' c Con: Steenson (1/1) 64'; Pen: J. Simmonds (1/2) 6'	Report	Try: B. Vunipola 15' c Wyles (2) 19' m, 47' c Earle 79' m Con: Farrell (2/3) 16', 48'; Pen: Spencer (1/1) 71'; Cards: Brits (yellow card) 60'	Attendance: 75,128; Referee: Wayne Barnes (RFU)
Exeter: Forwards – 1. Hepburn 2. Cowan-Dickie 3. Francis 4. Lees 5. J. Hill 6. Ewers 7. Armand (c) 8. S. Simmonds; Backs – 9. White 10. J. Simmonds 11. Woodburn 12. S. Hill 13. Slade 14. Nowell 15. Turner; Substitutes – 16. Yeandle 17. Moon 18. Holmes 19. Skinner 20. Waldrom 21. Townsend 22. Steenson 23. Whitten				Attendance: 75,128; Referee: Wayne Barnes (RFU)
Saracens: Forwards – 1. M. Vunipola 2. George 3. Koch 4. Itoje 5. Kruis 6. Isiekwe 7. Wray 8. B. Vunipola; Backs – 9. Wigglesworth 10. Farrell 11. Wyles 12. Barritt (c) 13. Lozowski 14. Maitland 15. Goode; Substitutes – 16. Brits 17. Barrington 18. Figallo 19. Skelton 20. Rhodes 21. Spencer 22. Bosch 23. Earle

1 June 2019	Exeter Chiefs	34–37	Saracens	Twickenham, London
15:00 BST (UTC+01)	Try: White 1' c Ewers 21' c J. Hill 31' m Slade 58' m S. Hill 80+1' c Con: J. Simmonds (3/5) 2', 22', 80+2'; Pen: J. Simmonds (1/1) 40+1'; Cards: Slade (yellow card) 4'	Report	Try: George (2) 4' m, 77' c Spencer 14' m L. Williams 60' c Maitland 68' c Con: Farrell (3/5) 62', 69', 78'; Pen: Farrell (2/3) 10', 36'; Cards: Itoje (yellow card) 20'	Attendance: 75,329; Referee: Wayne Barnes (RFU)
Exeter: Forwards – 1. Moon 2. Yeandle (c) 3. H. Williams 4. Dennis 5. J. Hill 6. Ewers 7. Armand 8. Kvesic; Backs – 9. White 10. J. Simmonds 11. O'Flaherty 12. Devoto 13. Slade 14. Cuthbert 15. Nowell; Substitutes – 16. Cowan-Dickie 17. Hepburn 18. Francis 19. Skinner 20. S. Simmonds 21. Maunder 22. Steenson 23. S. Hill				Attendance: 75,329; Referee: Wayne Barnes (RFU)
Saracens: Forwards – 1. Barrington 2. George 3. Koch 4. Skelton 5. Kruis 6. Itoje 7. Wray 8. B. Vunipola; Backs – 9. Spencer 10. Farrell 11. Maitland 12. Barritt (c) 13. Lozowski 14. L. Williams 15. Goode; Substitutes – 16. Woolstencroft 17. Adams-Hale 18. Judge 19. Isiekwe 20. Rhodes 21. Wigglesworth 22. Tompkins 23. Strettle

18 June 2022	Leicester Tigers	15–12	Saracens	Twickenham, London
15:00 BST (UTC+01)	Try: Liebenberg 27' c Wiese 35' m Con: Burns (1/2) 28'; Drop: Burns (1/1) 79'; Cards: Scott (yellow card) 75'	Report	Pen: Farrell (3/3) 5', 63', 76'; Daly (1/1) 30'; Cards: Davies (yellow card) 25'	Attendance: 72,748; Referee: Wayne Barnes (RFU)
Leicester: Forwards – 1. Genge (c) 2. Montoya 3. Cole 4. Chessum 5. Green 6. Liebenberg 7. Reffell 8. Wiese; Backs – 9. Wigglesworth 10. Ford 11. Potter 12. Porter 13. Moroni 14. Ashton 15. Steward; Substitutes – 16. Clare 17. Leatigaga 18. Heyes 19. Wells 20. Martin 21. Youngs 22. Burns 23. Scott				Attendance: 72,748; Referee: Wayne Barnes (RFU)
Saracens: Forwards – 1. M. Vunipola 2. George 3. Koch 4. Itoje 5. Isiekwe 6. McFarland 7. Earl 8. B. Vunipola; Backs – 9. Davies 10. Farrell (c) 11. Maitland 12. Tompkins 13. Daly 14. Malins 15. Goode; Substitutes – 16. Pifeleti 17. Mawi 18. Clarey 19. Wray 20. Christie 21. van Zyl 22. Taylor 23. Lozowski

27 May 2023	Saracens	35–25	Sale Sharks	Twickenham, London
15:00 BST (UTC+01)	Try: Penalty try 22'; Malins 34' c Daly 67' m van Zyl 71' c Con: Farrell (2/3) 35', 72'; Pen: Farrell (3/3) 5', 14', 50'; Cards: Hislop (yellow card) 74'	Report	Try: van der Merwe 31' c Roebuck 44' m Rodd 52' c Con: Ford (2/3) 32', 53'; Pen: Ford (2/3) 7', 18'; Cards: T. Curry (yellow card) 22'	Attendance: 61,875; Referee: Luke Pearce (RFU)
Saracens: Forwards – 1. Mawi 2. George 3. Riccioni 4. Itoje 5. Tizard 6. Isiekwe 7. Earl 8. Wray; Backs – 9. van Zyl 10. Farrell (c) 11. Maitland 12. Tompkins 13. Lozowski 14. Malins 15. Goode; Substitutes – 16. Dan 17. Hislop 18. Judge 19. Hunter-Hill 20. Knight 21. Davies 22. Taylor 23. Daly				Attendance: 61,875; Referee: Luke Pearce (RFU)
Sale: Forwards – 1. McIntyre 2. van der Merwe 3. Schonert 4. J-L. du Preez 5. Hill 6. T. Curry 7. Dugdale 8. Ross (c); Backs – 9. Warr 10 Ford 11. Reed 12. Tuilagi 13. R. du Preez 14. Roebuck 15. Carpenter; Substitutes - 16. Ashman 17. Rodd 18. Oosthuizen 19. Beaumont 20. Ellis 21. Quirke 22. S. James 23. O'Flaherty

=== European Champions Cup ===
==== All-time statistical leaders ====
As of 31 October 2025

Appearances
Rank	Player	Games
1.	(England) Alex Goode	77
2.	(England) Owen Farrell	76
3.	(England) Jamie George	74
4.	(England) Richard Wigglesworth	69
5.	(England) Mako Vunipola	66

Points
Rank	Player	Points
1.	(England) Owen Farrell	875
2.	(New Zealand) Glen Jackson	193
3.	(England) Chris Ashton	145
4.	(England) Alex Goode	131
5.	(England) Charlie Hodgson	114

Tries
Rank	Player	Tries
1.	(England) Chris Ashton	29
2.	(United States) Chris Wyles	21
3.	(England) David Strettle	13
4.	(Scotland) Sean Maitland	12
5.	(England) Alex Goode	10

==== Player of the Year ====
The following Saracens players have been named the EPCR Player of the Year:

- (England) Maro Itoje
  - (2015–16)
- (England) Owen Farrell
  - (2016–17)
- (England) Alex Goode
  - (2018–19)

==== Finals record ====
Saracens has competed in 4 European cup finals in total, with a record of 3 wins and 1 loss.

Win Loss

24 May 2014	Toulon (France)	23–6	(England) Saracens	(Wales) Millennium Stadium, Cardiff
17:00 BST (UTC+01)	Try: Giteau 29' c Smith 59' c Con: Wilkinson (2/2) 30', 60'; Pen: Wilkinson (2/2) 53', 63'; Drop: Wilkinson (1/1) 37'; Cards: Fernández Lobbe (yellow card) 21'	Report	Pen: Farrell (2/3) 3', 45'	Attendance: 67,586; Referee: Alain Rolland (Ireland)
Toulon: Forwards – 1. Chiocci 2. Burden 3. Hayman 4. B. Botha 5. Rossouw 6. Smith 7. Fernández Lobbe 8. S. Armitage; Backs – 9. Tillous-Borde 10. Wilkinson (c) 11. Habana 12. Giteau 13. Bastareaud 14. Mitchell 15. D. Armitage; Substitutes – 16. Orioli 17. Menini 18. Castrogiovanni 19. A. Williams 20. Bruni 21. Mermoz 22. Claassens 23. Suta				Attendance: 67,586; Referee: Alain Rolland (Ireland)
Saracens: Forwards – 1. M. Vunipola 2. Brits 3. Stevens 4. Borthwick (c) 5. Hargreaves 6. Brown 7. J. Burger 8. B. Vunipola; Backs – 9. Wigglesworth 10. Farrell 11. Strettle 12. Barritt 13. Bosch 14. Ashton 15. Goode; Substitutes – 16. George 17. Barrington 18. Johnston 19. M. Botha 20. Wray 21. de Kock 22. Hodgson 23. Wyles

14 May 2016	Saracens (England)	21–9	(France) Racing 92	(France) Parc Olympique Lyonnais, Lyon
17:45 CET (UTC+02)	Pen: Farrell (7/7) 10', 25', 32', 39', 51', 76', 79'	Report	Pen: Goosen (3/3) 18', 36', 58'	Attendance: 58,017; Referee: Nigel Owens (Wales)
Saracens: Forwards – 1. M. Vunipola 2. Brits 3. du Plessis 4. Itoje 5. Kruis 6. Rhodes 7. Fraser 8. B. Vunipola; Backs – 9. Wigglesworth 10. Farrell 11. Wyles 12. Barritt (c) 13. Taylor 14. Ashton 15. Goode; Substitutes – 16. George 17. Barrington 18. Figallo 19. Hamilton 20. Wray 21. Spencer 22. Hodgson 23. Bosch				Attendance: 58,017; Referee: Nigel Owens (Wales)
Racing 92: Forwards – 1. Ben Arous 2. Szarzewski (c) 3. Tameifuna 4. Charteris 5. van der Merwe 6. Lauret 7. Le Roux 8. Masoe; Backs – 9. Machenaud 10. Carter 11. Imhoff 12. Dumoulin 13. Goosen 14. Rokocoko 15. Dulin; Substitutes – 16. Lacombe 17. Vartanov 18. Ducalon 19. Carizza 20. Claassen 21. Phillips 22. Talès 23. Chavancy

13 May 2017	Clermont (France)	17–28	(England) Saracens	(Scotland) Murrayfield Stadium, Edinburgh
17:00 BST (UTC+01)	Try: Lamerat 26' c Abendanon 51' c Con: Parra (2/2) 27', 53'; Pen: Parra (1/1) 60'	Report	Try: Ashton 12' m Kruis 21' c Goode 72' c Con: Farrell (2/3) 22', 73'; Pen: Farrell (3/3) 50', 57', 78'	Attendance: 55,272; Referee: Nigel Owens (Wales)
Clermont: Forwards – 1. Chaume 2. Kayser 3. Zirakashvili 4. Iturria 5. Vahaamahina 6. Chouly (c) 7. Yato 8. Lee; Backs – 9. Parra 10. Lopez 11. Abendanon 12. Lamerat 13. Rougerie 14. Strettle 15. Spedding; Substitutes – 16. Ulugia 17. Falgoux 18. Jarvis 19. Jedrasiak 20. Lapandry 21. Radosavljevic 22. Fernández 23. Penaud				Attendance: 55,272; Referee: Nigel Owens (Wales)
Saracens: Forwards – 1. M. Vunipola 2. George 3. Koch 4. Itoje 5. Kruis 6. Rhodes 7. Wray 8. B. Vunipola; Backs – 9. Wigglesworth 10. Farrell 11. Wyles 12. Barritt (c) 13. Bosch 14. Ashton 15. Goode; Substitutes – 16. Brits 17. Lamositele 18. du Plessis 19. Hamilton 20. S. Burger 21. Spencer 22. Lozowski 23. Taylor

11 May 2019	Saracens (England)	20–10	(Ireland) Leinster	(England) St James' Park, Newcastle
17:00 BST (UTC+01)	Try: Maitland 40+2' c B. Vunipola 66' c Con: Farrell (2/2) 40+4', 67'; Pen: Farrell (2/2) 38', 58'; Cards: Itoje (yellow card) 29'	Report	Try: Furlong 31' c Con: Sexton (1/1) 33'; Pen: Sexton (1/1) 3'; Cards: Fardy (yellow card) 57'	Attendance: 51,930; Referee: Jérôme Garcès (France)
Saracens: Forwards – 1. M. Vunipola 2. George 3. Lamositele 4. Skelton 5. Kruis 6. Itoje 7. Wray 8. B. Vunipola; Backs – 9. Spencer 10. Farrell 11. Maitland 12. Barritt (c) 13. Lozowski 14. Williams 15. Goode; Substitutes – 16. Gray 17. Barrington 18. Koch 19. Isiekwe 20. S. Burger 21. Wigglesworth 22. Tompkins 23. Strettle				Attendance: 51,930; Referee: Jérôme Garcès (France)
Leinster: Forwards – 1. Healy 2. Cronin 3. Furlong 4. Toner 5. Ryan 6. Fardy 7. O'Brien 8. Conan; Backs – 9. L. McGrath 10. Sexton (c) 11. Lowe 12. Henshaw 13. Ringrose 14. Larmour 15. Kearney; Substitutes – 16. Tracy 17. J. McGrath 18. Bent 19. Ruddock 20. Deegan 21. O'Sullivan 22. Byrne 23. O'Loughlin

=== European Challenge Cup ===
==== All-time statistical leaders ====
As of 31 October 2025

Appearances
Rank	Player	Games
1.	(England) Alex Goode	14
2.	(Italy) Matías Agüero	13
2.	(Italy) Fabio Ongaro	13
4.	(England) Steve Borthwick	12
4.	(England) Noah Cato	12

Points
Rank	Player	Points
1.	(New Zealand) Glen Jackson	137
2.	(England) Owen Farrell	60
3.	(South Africa) Derick Hougaard	43
4.	(Scotland) Gordon Ross	29
5.	(England) Andy Saull	25

Tries
Rank	Player	Tries
1.	(England) Andy Saull	5
2.	(South Africa) Neil de Kock	3
2.	(Scotland) Sean Maitland	3
2.	(England) Rodd Penney	3
2.	(Fiji) Kameli Ratuvou	3

== Season summaries ==
	League				Domestic cup		Europe	
Season	Competition	Position	Points	Play–offs	Competition	Performance	Competition	Performance
1987–1988	Courage League Division 2	3rd	34	N/A	John Player Cup	4th round	No competition	N/A
1988–1989	Courage League Division 2	1st (P)	22	N/A	Pilkington Cup	3rd round	No competition	N/A
1989–1990	Courage League Division 1	4th	15	N/A	Pilkington Cup	4th round	No competition	N/A
1990–1991	Courage League Division 1	10th	10	N/A	Pilkington Cup	4th round	No competition	N/A
1991–1992	Courage League Division 1	5th	15	N/A	Pilkington Cup	4th round	No competition	N/A
1992–1993	Courage League Division 1	11th	6	N/A	Pilkington Cup	4th round	No competition	N/A
1993–1994	Courage League Division 2	3rd	23	N/A	Pilkington Cup	Quarter–final	No competition	N/A
1994–1995	Courage League Division 2	1st (P)	31	N/A	Pilkington Cup	4th round	No competition	N/A
1995–1996	Courage League Division 1	9th	10	N/A	Pilkington Cup	5th round	No English teams	N/A
1996–1997	Courage League Division 1	6th	25	N/A	Pilkington Cup	Quarter–final	Not qualified	N/A
1997–1998	Allied Dunbar Premiership	2nd	37	N/A	Tetley's Bitter Cup	Champions	ERC Challenge Cup	2nd in pool
1997–1998	Allied Dunbar Premiership	2nd	37	N/A	C&G Cup	Pool stage	ERC Challenge Cup	2nd in pool
1998–1999	Allied Dunbar Premiership	3rd	33	N/A	Tetley's Bitter Cup	Quarter–final	No English teams	N/A
1998–1999	Allied Dunbar Premiership	3rd	33	N/A	C&G Cup	2nd round	No English teams	N/A
1999–2000	Allied Dunbar Premiership	4th	28	N/A	Tetley's Bitter Cup	5th round	Heineken Cup	2nd in pool
2000–2001	Zurich Premiership	5th	58	N/A	Tetley's Bitter Cup	Quarter–final	Heineken Cup	2nd in pool
2001–2002	Zurich Premiership	10th	34	N/A	Powergen Cup	Quarter–final	Parker Pen Challenge Cup	Quarter–final
2002–2003	Zurich Premiership	8th	42	—	Powergen Cup	Quarter–final	Parker Pen Challenge Cup	Semi–final
2003–2004	Zurich Premiership	10th	39	—	Powergen Cup	Quarter–final	Parker Pen Challenge Cup	Quarter–final
2004–2005	Zurich Premiership	5th	57	—	Powergen Cup	Quarter–final	Parker Pen Challenge Cup	Quarter–final
2005–2006	Guinness Premiership	10th	46	—	Powergen Cup	4th in pool	Heineken Cup	2nd in pool
2006–2007	Guinness Premiership	4th	63	Semi–final	EDF Energy Cup	3rd in pool	ERC Challenge Cup	Semi–final
2007–2008	Guinness Premiership	8th	52	—	EDF Energy Cup	Semi–final	Heineken Cup	Semi–final
2008–2009	Guinness Premiership	9th	47	—	EDF Energy Cup	3rd in pool	ERC Challenge Cup	Semi–final
2009–2010	Guinness Premiership	3rd	69	Runners–up	LV= Cup	Semi–final	Amlin Challenge Cup	2nd in pool
2010–2011	Aviva Premiership	2nd	76	Champions	LV= Cup	2nd in pool	Heineken Cup	4th in pool
2011–2012	Aviva Premiership	3rd	73	Semi–final	LV= Cup	2nd in pool	Heineken Cup	Quarter–final
2012–2013	Aviva Premiership	1st	77	Semi–final	LV= Cup	Semi–final	Heineken Cup	Semi–final
2013–2014	Aviva Premiership	1st	87	Runners–up	LV= Cup	Semi–final	Heineken Cup	Runners–up
2014–2015	Aviva Premiership	4th	68	Champions	LV= Cup	Champions	European Champions Cup	Semi–final
2015–2016	Aviva Premiership	1st	80	Champions	No competition	N/A	European Champions Cup	Champions
2016–2017	Aviva Premiership	3rd	77	Semi–final	Anglo-Welsh Cup	Semi–final	European Champions Cup	Champions
2017–2018	Aviva Premiership	2nd	77	Champions	Anglo-Welsh Cup	Pool stage	European Champions Cup	Quarter–final
2018–2019	Gallagher Premiership	2nd	78	Champions	Premiership Rugby Cup	Runners–up	Heineken Champions Cup	Champions
2019–2020	Gallagher Premiership	12th	–38	—	Premiership Rugby Cup	Semi–final	Heineken Champions Cup	Semi–final
2020–2021	Greene King IPA Championship	2nd (P)	40	Champions	No competition	N/A	Not qualified	N/A
2021–2022	Gallagher Premiership	2nd	87	Runners–up	Premiership Rugby Cup	Pool stage	EPCR Challenge Cup	Semi–final
2022–2023	Gallagher Premiership	1st	74	Champions	Premiership Rugby Cup	Pool stage	Heineken Champions Cup	Quarter–final
2023–2024	Gallagher Premiership	4th	56	Semi–final	Premiership Rugby Cup	Pool stage	Investec Champions Cup	Round of 16
2024–2025	Gallagher Premiership	6th	56	—	Premiership Rugby Cup	Pool stage	Investec Champions Cup	Round of 16
2025–2026	Gallagher PREM	5th	57	—	PREM Rugby Cup	Pool stage	Investec Champions Cup	Round of 16

Gold background denotes champions
Silver background denotes runners-up
Pink background denotes relegated

== Additional sources ==
- 'The Saracen', Matchday programmes 1998–2007
