= Petrus du Plessis =

Rugby coach and player

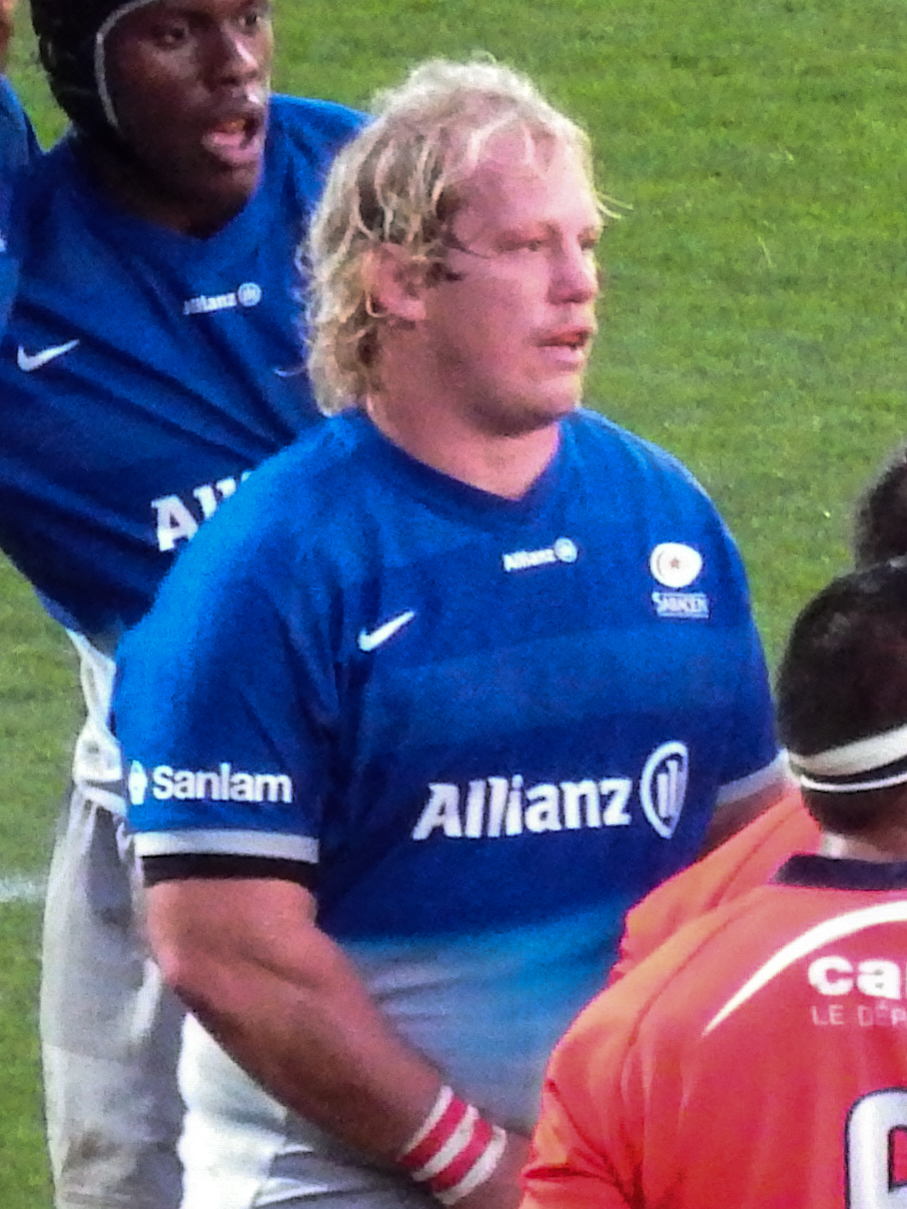
- Born: Petrus du Plessis; 31 May 1981 (age 45) Hermanus, South Africa
- Height: 1.85 m (6 ft 1 in)
- Weight: 122 kg (19 st 3 lb)
- School: University of Salford

Rugby union career
- Position: Prop
Senior career
| Years | Team | Apps | (Points) |
| 2001-2003 | St Helens | 40 | (20) |
| 2003-2004 | Orrell | 7 | (10) |
| 2004-2009 | Sedgley Park | 153 | (30) |
| 2009-2010 | Nottingham | 21 | (10) |
| 2010-2017 | Saracens | 158 | (10) |
| 2017-2018 | London Irish | 23 | (10) |
| 2018-2020 | Glasgow Warriors | 7 | (0) |
- Correct as of 3 August 2018
Coaching career
- Years: Team
- 2019-2020: Glasgow Warriors (Scrum) 2020-2023 Wallabies scrum coach web

Official website
- https://www.rugby.com.au/news/2020/11/04/petrus-du-plessis-says-he-wants-wallabies-scrum-the-best-in-the-rugby-world

Petrus du Plessis (born in Hermanus, South Africa, May 31, 1981) is a professional rugby coach and former player, most recently for Glasgow Warriors. He played as a Tighthead Prop and acted as player-coach at the club.

== Rugby Union career ==
=== Professional career ===
He joined Saracens in the 2009-10 season from Nottingham. Whilst at Saracens he helped them win three Premiership titles in 2011, 2015 and 2016. He was a replacement in 2011 but started in both 2015 and 2016. He also helped Saracens win the European Champions Cup in 2016 and 2017.

On 2 June 2017 it was announced du Plessis would be moving to London Irish for the 2017-18 English Premiership season.

He was released from London Irish and signed by Glasgow Warriors on 9 October 2018.

=== Coaching career ===
He was made scrum coach of Glasgow Warriors on 3 June 2019. He was signed until 2021 in a deal which also involved playing when required. He departed the club in July 2020. In September 2020 he was employed by Rugby Australia to become the scrum coach for the Wallabies Rugby team.

== Acting career ==
du Plessis also made his acting debut after appearing in London Fields as Marmaduke's carer alongside Billy Bob Thornton and Theo James. He also joined the cast of Gatwick Gangsters in 2014.

== Physiotherapy career ==
du Plessis is also a qualified physiotherapist and graduated from the University of Salford in 2008.
