= Victor Harding =

England international rugby union player

- Full name: Victor Sydney James Harding
- Born: 18 June 1932 Southwark, London, England
- Died: 24 November 2017 (aged 85)
- Height: 6 ft 3 in (191 cm)
- School: St Marylebone Grammar School
- University: University of Cambridge

Rugby union career
- Position: Lock
International career
Years	Team	Apps	(Points)
1961–62	England	6	(3)

Victor Sydney James Harding (18 June 1932 – 24 November 2017) was an English international rugby union player.

Born in Southwark, Harding was educated at St Marylebone Grammar School and the University of Cambridge, where he won three rugby blues. He also played rugby for Middlesex, Sale, Saracens and the Edinburgh Wanderers.

Harding, a lock, was capped six times by England during the early 1960s while a Saracens player. He debuted against France in the 1961 Five Nations Championship and scored England's only try in a 5–5 draw.

== See also ==
- List of England national rugby union players
