= Tony Diprose =

British Lions & England international rugby union player

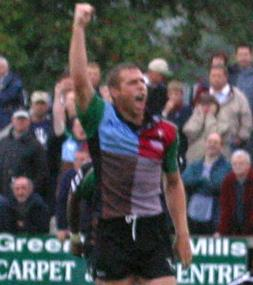
- Diprose in 2005
- Born: Tony Diprose; 22 September 1972 (age 54) Orsett, Essex, England
- Height: 6 ft 5 in (1.96 m)
- Weight: 17 st 9 lb (112 kg)
- School: The Campion School
- University: Loughborough University

Rugby union career
- Position: Number eight
Amateur team(s)
Years	Team	Apps	(Points)
- Loughborough students
Senior career
Years	Team	Apps	(Points)
1991–2001	Saracens	209	(190)
2001–2006	Harlequins	86	(30)
International career
Years	Team	Apps	(Points)
1997–98	England	10	(5)
1997	British & Irish Lions		

Tony Diprose (born 22 September 1972, in Orsett) is a former English rugby union footballer. He played at number 8.

Diprose attended The Campion School, Hornchurch.

== Club career ==
Diprose signed for Harlequins from Saracens in April 2001 and made his début in the pre-season friendly against Bedford at Goldington Road four months later (18 August 2001). Diprose scored his first try for Quins in the Heineken Cup match away to Munster (5 January 2002) and for his efforts over the 2002/03 campaign, he was named 'Supporters Player of the Season.'

Diprose retired at the end of the 2005/06 season and joined the coaching staff at Harlequins as the Academy Manager. As of January 2020 Tony is the head of sport at Canford School.

== International career ==
In 1995/96, Diprose captained England A to an unbeaten season, just 12 months after being voted the RFU Young Player of the Year.

Diprose has won ten full caps for England and has a reputation of being one of the most talented footballing forwards of his generation. He won his first cap against Argentina in 1997 and scored a try. He was also called up to the 1997 British Lions tour to South Africa as an injury replacement for Scott Quinnell.

In 1998, Diprose captained England against Australia after Matt Dawson was forced to withdraw through injury.

Sporting positions
Preceded by Lawrence Dallaglio	English National Rugby Union Captain; Jun 1998	Succeeded by Matt Dawson
