= Duncan Taylor (rugby union) =

Scotland international rugby union player

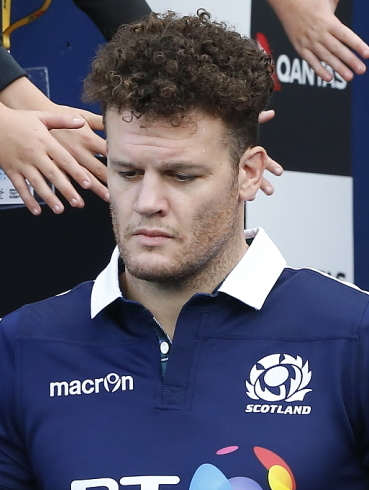
- Taylor in 2017
- Born: Duncan McWilliam Taylor; 5 September 1989 (age 37) Northampton, England
- Height: 1.91 m (6 ft 3 in)
- Weight: 100 kg (15 st 10 lb; 220 lb)

Rugby union career
- Position(s): Centre, Wing, Fullback
Senior career
Years	Team	Apps	(Points)
2010–2012	Bedford Blues	17	(35)
2012–2023	Saracens	157	(75)
- Correct as of 21 June 2023
International career
Years	Team	Apps	(Points)
2013	Scotland A		
2013–2020	Scotland	28	(17)
- Correct as of 17 September 2019

Duncan Taylor (born 5 September 1989) is a Scottish retired professional rugby union player. His regular playing position was centre. He played for Saracens in Premiership Rugby between 2012 and 2023, during this period the club won several Premiership's and three European Cups.

== Early life and education ==
Taylor travelled extensively during his childhood and lived in England, Scotland and Australia. He qualifies for Scotland through his Scottish parents.

Taylor was educated at Davidson Mains Primary School in Edinburgh, Olney Middle School (playing rugby for Olney RFC), Davidson School in Sydney, Australia (playing for Garigal RFC), a return to Olney Middle School, then Ousedale School in Newport Pagnell.

== Rugby playing career ==
Taylor did not play for a county or country junior sides.

=== Club level ===
Taylor signed for Bedford Blues aged 17. He then joined Saracens on a dual-registration deal in the summer of 2011.

Mark McCall has described Taylor as an underappreciated player, and as a very popular player in the Saracens squad, and he has been described as a 'player's player.' During his time at Saracens he has won three Premiership finals in 2015, 2016 and 2023, scoring a try in the 2016 final. He also helped Saracens win the European Champions Cup in 2016 and 2017. On 9 May 2023, it was announced Taylor would be leaving Saracens.

=== International level ===
Taylor first earned international honours representing Scotland A during their 2013 campaign. He scored a famous try in their first ever victory away to England Saxons at the sixth time of trying.

His impressive performances during the 2012–2013 season were rewarded when he was called up the senior Scotland squad for their Summer tour to South Africa. He made his full debut against Samoa later that year.

Playing for a club with a heavy fixture load has on occasion not helped Taylor's international career, at a time when Scotland had many player options at centre.

=== Injuries ===
Taylor tore his hamstring during Scotland's 2016 summer tour of Japan. He then had 2 ankle-related operations, shoulder problems, and concussions. He suffered a head injury in 1/18 and ligament injuries in 9/18.
