= Richard Barrington (rugby union) =

English rugby union player

- Born: Richard Barrington; 24 September 1990 (age 36) Gloucester, England
- Height: 1.86 m (6 ft 1 in)
- Weight: 123 kg (19 st 5 lb)
- University: Hartpury College

Rugby union career
- Position: Loosehead Prop
Amateur team(s)
Years	Team	Apps	(Points)
2011–2012	Hartpury College	22	(50)
- Correct as of 1 September 2018
Senior career
Years	Team	Apps	(Points)
2012–2013	Jersey	22	(10)
2013–2022	Saracens	232	(75)
2013	→ Bedford Blues	1	(0)
2022–2024	Agen	35	(5)
2024-	Ampthill	38	(10)
- Correct as of 23 May 2022
National sevens team
Years	Team		Comps
2011	Curaçao 7s		4

Richard Barrington (born 24 September 1990) is an English professional rugby union player. He plays at prop for Saracens. It was announced on 23 May 2022 that he would leave for French Pro D2 club, Agen at the end of the 2021/22 season.

During his time at Saracens he won four Premiership titles in 2015, 2016, 2018 and 2019, with Barrington featuring in all four finals. He also helped Saracens win the European Champions Cup in 2016, 2017 and 2019, though missed the 2017 final through injury. He will remain at Saracens until at least 2022.
