= Alistair Hargreaves =

South Africa international rugby union player

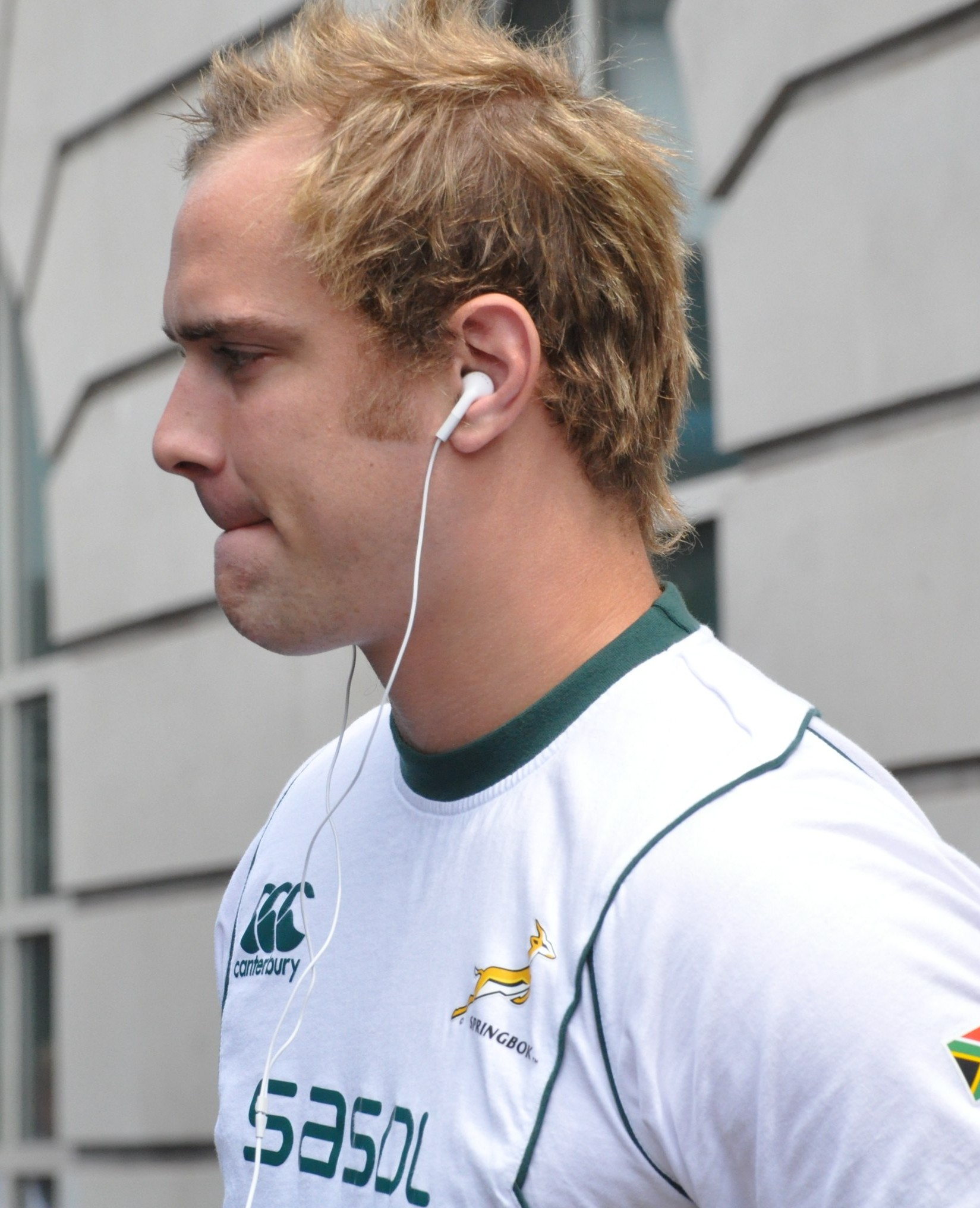
- Hargreaves in 2010
- Born: 29 April 1986 (age 40) Durban, South Africa
- Height: 2.01 m (6 ft 7 in)
- Weight: 116 kg (256 lb)

Rugby union career
- Position: Lock
Senior career
Years	Team	Apps	(Points)
2012–2016	Saracens	79	(10)
- Correct as of 15 February 2015
Provincial / State sides
Years	Team	Apps	(Points)
2005–2012	Sharks (Currie Cup)	53	(15)
Super Rugby
Years	Team	Apps	(Points)
2009–2012	Sharks	29	(5)
International career
Years	Team	Apps	(Points)
2010–2011	South Africa	4	(0)

Alistair John Hargreaves (born 29 April 1986 in Durban, South Africa) is a former rugby union player that played as a lock. He attended the Durban High School, where he was captain of rugby and headboy in 2004. During his time at the school Hargreaves represented the first XV from 2002 to 2004 and was regarded as one of the best talents in youth rugby. His performances led to selection for the SA schools side which he captained in 2004.

Since then he has gone on to represent the SA under 19 and u/21 sides, playing at both the Under 19 Rugby World Championship in 2004 and 2005 (of which he was captain). Impressive performances in these tournaments led to more opportunities with the Sharks and over the past few years he has established himself as a regular starter. To date he has picked up four caps for the national side along while also playing in non-capped games against Leicester Tigers and Saracens.

On 12 April 2012 Hargreaves signed a two-year deal with Saracens RFC. He was to link up alongside former Springboks including John Smit, Neil de Kock and Schalk Brits. He captained Saracens to victory in the 2015 Premiership final against Bath.

He announced his retirement from rugby in October 2016 after suffering multiple concussions. He then started working for Wolfpack lager, with former team-mate Chris Wyles.

Sporting positions
Preceded by Steve Borthwick	Saracens Captain; Jul 2014 – Jul 2016	Succeeded by Brad Barritt
