= Brendan Venter =

South African rugby union player

- Born: 29 December 1969 (age 56) Johannesburg, South Africa
- Height: 1.84 m (6 ft 1/2 in)
- Weight: 86 kg (190 lb; 13 st 8 lb)
- University: University of the Free State

Rugby union career
- Position(s): Centre, wing
Senior career
Years	Team	Apps	(Points)
1998–2003	London Irish	64	(25)
Provincial / State sides
Years	Team	Apps	(Points)
1990–1999	Free State	122	
2000	Western Province	2	
Super Rugby
Years	Team	Apps	(Points)
2000	Stormers	4	
International career
Years	Team	Apps	(Points)
1994–1999	South Africa	17	(10)

Brendan Venter (born 29 December 1969) is a South African rugby union coach and former player. Venter played at centre and earned 17 caps for South Africa between 1994 and 1999.

He played as a replacement in the 1995 Rugby World Cup final in which South Africa beat New Zealand to win their first World Cup.

== Youth ==
Venter was born on 29 December 1969 in Johannesburg. He played rugby for South African schools. He said that even then his studies came first. "I was a good rugby player at school. I saw it as a tool to get a degree—my parents weren't very wealthy. I decided that if I made it as a rugby player it would be a bonus but that even if I didn't it would pay for my studies and I could become a doctor."

Venter went to the University of the Orange Free State to study medicine and play rugby. After too much partying in his first year, he just scraped through his exams. "I had a real reality check. I had to decide if I really wanted to be a rugby player or a doctor. So when I returned for my second year there was a complete change in attitude, and rugby took second place. I was determined to be a good doctor and felt that I had to give my studies priority in order to achieve this."

== Playing career ==
Venter came on as replacement for James Small in the 1995 Rugby World Cup final. After the World Cup took place in 1995, rugby turned professional. However, Venter continued to practice as a doctor: "I was very lucky. Although we were professional, training in my province only started at five in the afternoon. So I had the whole day to work as a GP in my own practice as well as doing afternoons in anaesthetics. The rugby training was really my stress relief."

He was sent off in the 1999 Rugby World Cup for stamping against Uruguay in the pool stages, and was replaced by Pieter Muller for the rest of the tournament.

== Coaching career ==
=== London Irish ===
In 2001 Venter moved to the United Kingdom with his wife and two children to coach and play for London Irish. "I was very analytical as a player and had always wanted to try out my ideas as a coach." Concurrently he continued to fit in GP locum work as well as dealing with his team's medical needs. He started in the 2002 Powergen Cup Final at Twickenham, as London Irish defeated the Northampton Saints.

=== Saracens ===
He has admitted that when it comes to the crunch, he would always choose rugby over medicine, citing his newfound love of the game after joining Saracens as Director of Rugby in 2009.

On 13 May 2010 Venter was charged with misconduct by the RFU for allegedly pushing a Leicester Tigers supporter who had asked him to sit down as he was blocking the view of the paying fans as well as making inappropriate comments and gestures to spectators. In his defence, Venter described the incident as a bit of fun and the chief executive and the club owner of Saracens have defended Venter, claiming they considered it out of character for him. He had an existing four-week suspended ban from an incident earlier in the season, and eventually received a 10-week ban from rugby.

In November 2010 he was found guilty of misconduct due to being "inappropriately critical of ERC, the tournament, the match officials and the sport of rugby union" by ERC after he complained about the referee following his side losing at home in a key match when he considered them to be the better side, comments from neutral fans have expressed surprise at his opinions as his side were seen as out played and out thought by the opposing team. He was fined £21,850, but £13,100 was suspended until 30 June 2012.

In December 2010, Venter was warned by the ERC after giving a bizarre post-match interview following the Saracens defeat to Racing Métro 92 in the Heineken Cup. Venter gave extremely short answers to every question posed to him, and afterwards admitted that he was inspired from a comedy sketch from the film Mike Bassett: England Manager which he had recently watched. The interview has since become a hit on YouTube.

Venter left his full time role at Saracens half way through the 2010–11 season and was replaced by Mark McCall. Saracens went on to win their first Premiership title at the end of that season and Venter was credited with setting the blueprint which facilitated this success. Venter continued a part-time role at Saracens as "Technical Adviser"

==== Return to Director of Rugby ====
Venter will return to full-time role of Director of Rugby for the 2026–27 Prem Rugby season following McCall's decision to step away. He had spent the last 15 years in a part-time role for the club.

=== Sharks ===
In June 2013, he was appointed the Director of Rugby at the Sharks, effective from the start of the 2013 Currie Cup Premier Division season. A role he took in addition to his role at Saracens.

=== Return to London Irish ===
On 1 July 2016, it was confirmed that Venter would return to London Irish as technical director in a new coaching setup. He was released from his role in March 2017 to be replaced by Declan Kidney.

=== Italy ===
In January 2017 it was announced that Venter had been appointed defence coach of Italy until the end of the 2019 Rugby World Cup. He had worked with the team in the previous year as a consultant.

=== South Africa ===
In addition to his role with both Italy and London Irish, Venter took on the role of defence and exits coach for South Africa in spring 2017.

Italy confirmed that he would work with South Africa during the mid-year internationals and the Rugby Championship before returning to Italy for the autumn internationals.

== See also ==
- List of South Africa national rugby union players – Springbok no. 605
