= List of British & Irish Lions international matches =

This is a list of international match results of the British & Irish Lions, previously known as the British Lions and other names. Not all matches have been considered 'Test matches'. For example, matches against Argentina have not been given Test status, with the exception of the pre-tour match in 2005. Similarly, when the Lions played Japan at Murrayfield in 2021, it was not given Test status.

== South Africa, 1891 ==
Date	Location	Result
30 July 1891	Port Elizabeth	South Africa 0–4 Great Britain (United Kingdom)
29 August 1891	Kimberley	South Africa 0–3 Great Britain (United Kingdom)
5 September 1891	Cape Town	South Africa 0–4 Great Britain (United Kingdom)

== South Africa, 1896 ==
Date	Location	Result
30 July 1896	Port Elizabeth	South Africa 0–8 Great Britain (United Kingdom)
22 August 1896	Johannesburg	South Africa 8–17 Great Britain (United Kingdom)
29 August 1896	Kimberley	South Africa 3–9 Great Britain (United Kingdom)
5 September 1896	Cape Town	South Africa 5–0 Great Britain (United Kingdom)

== Australia, 1899 ==
Date	Location	Result	Attendance
24 June 1899	Sydney	Australia 13–3 Great Britain (United Kingdom)	28,000
22 July 1899	Brisbane	Australia 0–11 Great Britain (United Kingdom)	15,000
5 August 1899	Sydney	Australia 10–11 Great Britain (United Kingdom)	16,000
12 August 1899	Sydney	Australia 0–13 Great Britain (United Kingdom)	7,000

== South Africa, 1903 ==
Date	Location	Result
26 August 1903	Johannesburg	South Africa 10–10 Great Britain (United Kingdom)
5 September 1903	Kimberley	South Africa 0–0 Great Britain (United Kingdom)
12 September 1903	Cape Town	South Africa 8–0 Great Britain (United Kingdom)

== Australia & New Zealand, 1904 ==
Date	Location	Result
2 July 1904	Sydney	Australia 0–17 Great Britain (United Kingdom)
23 July 1904	Brisbane	Australia 3–17 Great Britain (United Kingdom)
30 July 1904	Sydney	Australia 0–16 Great Britain (United Kingdom)
13 August 1904	Wellington	New Zealand 9–0 Great Britain (United Kingdom)

== New Zealand, 1908 ==
Date	Location	Result
6 June 1908	Dunedin	New Zealand 32–5 England & Wales (United Kingdom)
27 June 1908	Wellington	New Zealand 3–3 England & Wales (United Kingdom)
25 July 1908	Auckland	New Zealand 29–0 England & Wales (United Kingdom)

== Argentina, 1910 ==
Date	Location	Result
12 June 1910	Buenos Aires	Argentina 3–28 Combined British (United Kingdom)

== South Africa, 1910 ==
Date	Location	Result
6 August 1910	Johannesburg	South Africa 14–10 (United Kingdom) British Lions
27 August 1910	Port Elizabeth	South Africa 3–8 (United Kingdom) British Lions
3 September 1910	Cape Town	South Africa 21–5 (United Kingdom) British Lions

== South Africa, 1924 ==
Date	Location	Result
16 August 1924	Durban	South Africa 7–3 British Lions
23 August 1924	Johannesburg	South Africa 17–0 British Lions
13 September 1924	Port Elizabeth	South Africa 3–3 British Lions
20 September 1924	Cape Town	South Africa 16–9 British Lions

== Argentina, 1927 ==
Date	Location	Result
31 July 1927	Buenos Aires	Argentina 0–37 British Lions
7 August 1927	Buenos Aires	Argentina 0–46 British Lions
14 August 1927	Buenos Aires	Argentina 3–34 British Lions
21 August 1927	Buenos Aires	Argentina 0–43 British Lions

== New Zealand & Australia, 1930 ==
Date	Location	Result
21 June 1930	Dunedin	New Zealand 3–6 British Lions
5 July 1930	Christchurch	New Zealand 13–10 British Lions
26 July 1930	Auckland	New Zealand 15–10 British Lions
9 August 1930	Wellington	New Zealand 22–8 British Lions
30 August 1930	Sydney	Australia 6–5 British Lions

== Argentina, 1936 ==
Date	Location	Result
16 August 1936	Buenos Aires	Argentina 0–23 British Lions

== South Africa, 1938 ==
Date	Location	Result
6 August 1938	Johannesburg	South Africa 26–12 British Lions
3 September 1938	Port Elizabeth	South Africa 19–3 British Lions
10 September 1938	Cape Town	South Africa 16–21 British Lions

== New Zealand, Australia & Ceylon 1950 ==
Date	Location	Result
27 May 1950	Dunedin	New Zealand 9–9 British Lions
10 June 1950	Christchurch	New Zealand 8–0 British Lions
1 July 1950	Wellington	New Zealand 6–3 British Lions
29 July 1950	Auckland	New Zealand 11–8 British Lions
19 August 1950	Brisbane	Australia 6–19 British Lions
26 August 1950	Sydney	Australia 3–24 British Lions

== South Africa & Kenya, 1955 ==
Date	Location	Result
6 August 1955	Johannesburg	South Africa 22–23 British Lions
20 August 1955	Cape Town	South Africa 25–9 British Lions
3 September 1955	Bloemfontein	South Africa 6–9 British Lions
24 September 1955	Port Elizabeth	South Africa 22–8 British Lions
28 September 1955	RFUEA Ground, Nairobi	East Africa 12–39 British Lions

== Australia & New Zealand, 1959 ==
Date	Location	Result
6 June 1959	Brisbane	Australia 6–17 British Lions
13 June 1959	Sydney	Australia 3–24 British Lions
18 July 1959	Dunedin	New Zealand 18–17 British Lions
15 August 1959	Wellington	New Zealand 11–8 British Lions
29 August 1959	Christchurch	New Zealand 22–8 British Lions
19 September 1959	Auckland	New Zealand 6–9 British Lions

== South Africa & Kenya, 1962 ==
Date	Location	Result
23 June 1962	Johannesburg	South Africa 3–3 British Lions
21 July 1962	Durban	South Africa 3–0 British Lions
4 August 1962	Cape Town	South Africa 8–3 British Lions
25 August 1962	Bloemfontein	South Africa 34–14 British Lions
28 August 1962	RFUEA Ground, Nairobi	East Africa 0–50 British Lions

== Australia, New Zealand & Canada, 1966 ==
Date	Location	Result
28 May 1966	Sydney	Australia 8–11 British Lions
4 June 1966	Brisbane	Australia 0–31 British Lions
16 July 1966	Dunedin	New Zealand 20–3 British Lions
6 August 1966	Wellington	New Zealand 16–12 British Lions
27 August 1966	Christchurch	New Zealand 19–6 British Lions
10 September 1966	Auckland	New Zealand 24–11 British Lions
17 September 1966	Toronto	Canada 8–19 British Lions

== South Africa, 1968 ==
Date	Location	Result
8 June 1968	Pretoria	South Africa 25–20 British Lions
22 June 1968	Port Elizabeth	South Africa 6–6 British Lions
13 July 1968	Cape Town	South Africa 11–6 British Lions
27 July 1968	Johannesburg	South Africa 19–6 British Lions

== Australia & New Zealand, 1971 ==
Date	Location	Result
26 June 1971	Carisbrook, Dunedin	New Zealand 3–9 British Lions
10 July 1971	Lancaster Park, Christchurch	New Zealand 22–12 British Lions
31 July 1971	Athletic Park, Wellington	New Zealand 3–13 British Lions
14 August 1971	Eden Park, Auckland	New Zealand 14–14 British Lions

== South Africa, 1974 ==
Date	Location	Result
8 June 1974	Newlands Stadium, Cape Town	South Africa 3–12 British Lions
22 June 1974	Loftus Versfeld Stadium, Pretoria	South Africa 9–28 British Lions
13 July 1974	Boet Erasmus Stadium, Port Elizabeth	South Africa 9–26 British Lions
27 July 1974	Ellis Park Stadium, Johannesburg	South Africa 13–13 British Lions

== New Zealand & Fiji, 1977 ==
Date	Location	Result
18 June 1977	Athletic Park, Wellington	New Zealand 16–12 British Lions
9 July 1977	Lancaster Park, Christchurch	New Zealand 9–13 British Lions
30 July 1977	Carisbrook, Dunedin	New Zealand 19–7 British Lions
13 August 1977	Eden Park, Auckland	New Zealand 10–9 British Lions
16 August 1977	Buckhurst Park, Suva	Fiji 25–21 British Lions

== South Africa, 1980 ==
Date	Location	Result	Attendance
31 May 1980	Newlands Stadium, Cape Town	South Africa 26–22 British Lions	38,170
14 June 1980	Free State Stadium, Bloemfontein	South Africa 26–19 British Lions	57,159
28 June 1980	Boet Erasmus Stadium, Port Elizabeth	South Africa 12–10 British Lions	49,250
12 July 1980	Loftus Versfeld Stadium, Pretoria	South Africa 13–17 British Lions	68,000

== New Zealand, 1983 ==
Date	Location	Result	Attendance
4 June 1983	Lancaster Park, Christchurch	New Zealand 16–12 British Lions	52,000
18 June 1983	Athletic Park, Wellington	New Zealand 9–0 British Lions	39,000
2 July 1983	Carisbrook, Dunedin	New Zealand 15–8 British Lions	32,000
16 July 1983	Eden Park, Auckland	New Zealand 38–6 British Lions	53,000

== The Rest, 1986 ==
Date	Location	Result
16 April 1986	Cardiff Arms Park, Cardiff	British Lions 7–15 The Rest

== Australia, 1989 ==
Date	Location	Result	Attendance
1 July 1989	Sydney Football Stadium, Sydney	Australia 30–12 British Lions	39,443
8 July 1989	Ballymore, Brisbane	Australia 12–19 British Lions	20,525
15 July 1989	Sydney Football Stadium, Sydney	Australia 18–19 British Lions	39,401

== France, 1989 ==
Date	Location	Result	Attendance
4 October 1989	Parc des Princes, Paris	France 27–29 British Lions	28,881

== New Zealand, 1993 ==
Date	Location	Result	Attendance
12 June 1993	Lancaster Park, Christchurch	New Zealand 20–18 British Lions	38,000
26 June 1993	Athletic Park, Wellington	New Zealand 7–20 British Lions	39,000
3 July 1993	Eden Park, Auckland	New Zealand 30–13 British Lions	47,000

== South Africa, 1997 ==
Date	Location	Result	Attendance
21 June 1997	Newlands Stadium, Cape Town	South Africa 16–25 British Lions	51,000
28 June 1997	Kings Park Stadium, Durban	South Africa 15–18 British Lions	50,000
5 July 1997	Ellis Park Stadium, Johannesburg	South Africa 35–16 British Lions	62,000

== Australia, 2001 ==
Date	Location	Result	Attendance
30 June 2001	The Gabba, Brisbane	Australia 13–29 British & Irish Lions	37,460
7 July 2001	Docklands Stadium, Melbourne	Australia 35–14 British & Irish Lions	56,505
14 July 2001	Stadium Australia, Sydney	Australia 29–23 British & Irish Lions	84,188

== New Zealand, 2005 ==
Date	Location	Result	Attendance
23 May 2005	Millennium Stadium, Cardiff	British & Irish Lions 25–25 Argentina	61,569
25 June 2005	Lancaster Park, Christchurch	New Zealand 21–3 British & Irish Lions	37,200
2 July 2005	Wellington Regional Stadium, Wellington	New Zealand 48–18 British & Irish Lions	39,800
9 July 2005	Eden Park, Auckland	New Zealand 38–19 British & Irish Lions	48,533

== South Africa, 2009 ==
Date	Location	Result	Attendance
20 June 2009	Kings Park Stadium, Durban	South Africa 26–21 British & Irish Lions	47,813
27 June 2009	Loftus Versfeld Stadium, Pretoria	South Africa 28–25 British & Irish Lions	52,511
4 July 2009	Ellis Park Stadium, Johannesburg	South Africa 9–28 British & Irish Lions	58,318

== Australia, 2013 ==
Date	Location	Result	Attendance
22 June 2013	Lang Park, Brisbane	Australia 21–23 British & Irish Lions	52,499
29 June 2013	Docklands Stadium, Melbourne	Australia 16–15 British & Irish Lions	56,771
6 July 2013	Stadium Australia, Sydney	Australia 16–41 British & Irish Lions	83,702

== New Zealand, 2017 ==
Date	Location	Result	Attendance
24 June 2017	Eden Park, Auckland	New Zealand 30–15 British & Irish Lions	48,181
1 July 2017	Wellington Regional Stadium, Wellington	New Zealand 21–24 British & Irish Lions	38,931
8 July 2017	Eden Park, Auckland	New Zealand 15–15 British & Irish Lions	48,601

== South Africa, 2021 ==
Date	Location	Result	Attendance
26 June 2021	Murrayfield Stadium, Edinburgh	British & Irish Lions 28–10 Japan	16,500
24 July 2021	Cape Town Stadium, Cape Town	South Africa 17–22 British & Irish Lions	0
31 July 2021	Cape Town Stadium, Cape Town	South Africa 27–9 British & Irish Lions	0
7 August 2021	Cape Town Stadium, Cape Town	South Africa 19–16 British & Irish Lions	0

== Australia, 2025 ==
Date	Location	Result	Attendance
20 June 2025	Aviva Stadium, Dublin	British & Irish Lions 24–28 Argentina	51,700
19 July 2025	Suncorp Stadium, Brisbane	Australia 19–27 British & Irish Lions	52,229
26 July 2025	Melbourne Cricket Ground, Melbourne	Australia 26–29 British & Irish Lions	90,307
2 August 2025	Accor Stadium, Sydney	Australia 22–12 British & Irish Lions	80,312
