= List of 2016–17 Top 14 transfers =

This is a list of player transfers involving Top 14 teams before or during the 2016–17 season. The list is of deals that are confirmed and are either from or to a rugby union team in the Top 14 during the 2015–16 season. It is not unknown for confirmed deals to be cancelled at a later date. Agen and Oyonnax were relegated to the Pro D2 for the 2016–17 season replaced by Lyon and Bayonne.

== Bayonne ==
=== Players In ===
- (Ivory Coast) Evrard Dion Oulai from (France) US Carcassonne
- (Wales) Ben Broster from (France) Biarritz Olympique
- (France) Emmanuel Saubusse from (France) Mont-de-Marsan
- (Samoa) Manu Leiataua from (France) Aurillac
- (France) Raphaël Lagarde from (France) Albi
- (France) Jérôme Schuster from (France) Tarbes
- (France) Adam Jaulhac from (France) Bordeaux Begles
- (France) Jean-Blaise Lespinasse from (France) Bordeaux Begles
- (France) Felix Le Bourhis from (France) Bordeaux Begles
- (New Zealand) Tom Donnelly from (France) Montpellier
- (Scotland) Johnnie Beattie from (France) Castres Olympique
- (New Zealand) Tanerau Latimer from (New Zealand) Blues
- (Georgia (country)) Davit Khinchagishvili from (France) Racing 92
- (Italy) Lorenzo Cittadini from (England) Wasps

=== Players Out ===
- (France) Pierre Sayerse to (France) US Montauban
- (France) Simon Courcoul to (France) RC Narbonne

== Bordeaux ==
=== Players In ===
- (France) Julien Audy from (France) La Rochelle
- (Ireland) Ian Madigan from (Ireland) Leinster
- (Moldova) Vadim Cobilas from (England) Sale Sharks
- (Australia) Luke Jones from (Australia) Melbourne Rebels
- (France) Marc Clerc from (France) Oyonnax
- (France) Geoffrey Cros from (France) Tarbes
- (France) Johan Aliouat from (France) US Carcassonne
- (Fiji) Josaia Vakacegu from (France) Béziers
- (South Africa) Kobus van Wyk from (South Africa) Western Province
- (England) Tom Palmer from (Italy) Benetton Treviso

=== Players Out ===
- (Argentina) Francisco Gomez Kodela to (France) Lyon
- (France) Julien Le Devedec to (France) CA Brive
- (France) Sofiane Guitoune to (France) Toulouse
- (Spain) Xerom Civil to (France) Albi
- (France) Lucas Blanc to (France) Albi
- (New Zealand) Patrick Toetu to (France) CA Brive
- (South Africa) Heini Adams retired
- (New Zealand) Matthew Clarkin retired
- (France) Charles Brousse to (France) Provence
- (Australia) Sekope Kepu to (Australia) NSW Waratahs
- (France) Pierre Bernard to (France) Toulon
- (France) Adam Jaulhac to (France) Bayonne
- (France) Jean-Blaise Lespinasse to (France) Bayonne
- (France) Felix Le Bourhis to (France) Bayonne

== Brive ==
=== Players In ===
- (France) Julien Le Devedec from (France) Bordeaux Begles
- (Georgia (country)) Vasil Lobzhanidze from (Georgia (country)) RC Armazi Tbilisi
- (New Zealand) Patrick Toetu from (France) Bordeaux Begles
- (Georgia (country)) Soso Bekoshvili from (France) Chambéry
- (France) Benjamin Lapeyre from (France) La Rochelle
- (Fiji) Seremaia Burotu from (France) Biarritz Olympique
- (France) Vivien Devisme from (France) Soyaux Angoulême

=== Players Out ===
- (France) Anderson Neisen to (France) Limoges
- (France) Yusuf Tuncer to (France) Albi
- (France) Hugues Briatte to (France) Nevers
- (France) Victor Lebas to (France) Soyaux Angoulême
- (Georgia (country)) Goderdzi Shvelidze retired
- (Georgia (country)) Anton Peikrishvili to (Ireland) Ulster

== Castres ==
=== Players In ===
- (France) Loic Jacquet from (France) Clermont Auvergne
- (France) Daniel Kotze from (France) Clermont Auvergne
- (South Africa) Jody Jenneker from (France) Oyonnax
- (Germany) Damien Tussac from (France) US Montauban
- (France) Tudor Stroe from (France) Tarbes
- (Australia) Afusipa Taumoepeau from (France) Albi
- (South Africa) Robert Ebersohn from (France) Montpellier
- (New Zealand) Maama Vaipulu from (New Zealand) Chiefs
- (Tonga) Steve Mafi from (Australia) Western Force
- (Argentina) Horacio Agulla from (England) Bath Rugby
- (France) Pierre Berard from (France) Montpellier
- (France) Maxime Javaux from (France) Racing 92
- (France) Thibault Lasselle from (France) Toulon

=== Players Out ===
- (Scotland) Richie Gray to (France) Toulouse
- (France) Remi Lamerat to (France) Clermont Auvergne
- (Samoa) Piula Faʻasalele to (France) Toulouse
- (Romania) Vlad Nistor to (France) Albi
- (New Zealand) Karena Wihongi to (France) Lyon
- (France) Benjamin Desroches to (France) Albi
- (New Zealand) Rudi Wulf to (France) Lyon
- (France) Ibrahim Diarra to (France) Pau
- (Scotland) Johnnie Beattie to (France) Bayonne
- (New Zealand) Daniel Kirkpatrick to (France) Albi
- (France) Mathieu Bonello retired
- (France) Yannick Forestier retired
- (France) Romain Cabannes retired
- (New Zealand) Sitiveni Sivivatu retired

== Clermont ==
=== Players In ===
- (Australia) Sitaleki Timani from (France) Montpellier
- (France) Remi Lamerat from (France) Castres Olympique
- (New Zealand) Isaia Toeava from (Japan) Kubota Spears
- (Wales) Aaron Jarvis from (Wales) Ospreys

=== Players Out ===
- (Wales) Jonathan Davies to (Wales) Scarlets
- (Australia) Brock James to (France) La Rochelle
- (France) Loic Jacquet to (France) Castres Olympique
- (France) Daniel Kotze to (France) Castres Olympique
- (Canada) Jamie Cudmore to (France) Oyonnax
- (South Africa) Pellow van der Westhuizen to (France) US Montauban

== Grenoble ==
=== Players In ===
- (France) David Mélé from (France) Toulouse
- (Fiji) Sisa Waqa from (Australia) Canberra Raiders
- (England) Aly Muldowney from (Ireland) Connacht

=== Players Out ===
- (New Zealand) Jackson Willison to (England) Worcester Warriors
- (France) Robinson Caire to (France) Biarritz Olympique
- (Tonga) Daniel Kilioni to (France) US Carcassonne
- (France) Kevin Goze to (France) Bourgoin

== La Rochelle ==
=== Players In ===
- (France) Vincent Rattez from (France) RC Narbonne
- (Australia) Brock James from (France) Clermont Auvergne
- (France) Alexis Balès from (France) Agen
- (New Zealand) Victor Vito from (New Zealand) Hurricanes
- (France) Dany Priso from (France) Stade Français Paris
- (France) Jérémie Maurouard from (France) Oyonnax
- (France) Mohamed Boughanmi from (France) Toulon
- Steeve Barry from France Sevens
- (France) Arthur Retière from (France) Racing 92
- (South Africa) Paul Jordaan from (South Africa) Sharks

=== Players Out ===
- (France) Julien Audy to (France) Bordeaux Begles
- (France) David Roumieu to (France) Biarritz Olympique
- (France) Thomas Synaeghel to (France) Biarritz Olympique
- (France) Fabien Fortassin to (France) Biarritz Olympique
- (France) Benjamin Lapeyre to (France) CA Brive
- (Georgia (country)) Gagi Bazadze to (France) Montpellier
- (Australia) Malietoa Hingano to (Japan) Honda Heat
- (France) Benjamin Geledan to (France) Oyonnax
- (France) Francois Herry to (France) Nevers
- (Fiji) Alipate Ratini to (France) Stade Français Paris
- (Samoa) Alofa Alofa to (England) Harlequins

== Lyon ==
=== Players In ===
- (France) Alexandre Menini from (France) Toulon
- (Argentina) Francisco Gomez Kodela from (France) Bordeaux Begles
- (New Zealand) Karena Wihongi from (France) Castres Olympique
- (France) Stéphane Clément from (France) Biarritz Olympique
- (France) Mickaël Ivaldi from (France) Montpellier
- (Samoa) Maselino Paulino from (Wales) Scarlets
- (New Zealand) Josh Bekhuis from (New Zealand) Blues
- (South Africa) Franco Mostert from (South Africa) Lions
- (France) Félix Lambey from (France) Béziers
- (France) Virgile Bruni from (France) Toulon
- (France) Frédéric Michalak from (France) Toulon
- (Australia) Mike Harris from (Australia) Melbourne Rebels
- (France) Théo Belan from (France) Toulon
- (England) Delon Armitage from (France) Toulon
- (New Zealand) Rudi Wulf from (France) Castres Olympique
- (Australia) Curtis Browning from (Australia) Queensland Reds
- (South Africa) BJ Botha from (Ireland) Munster

=== Players Out ===
- (France) Karim Kouider to (France) Béziers
- (Fiji) Waisale Sukanaveita to (France) US Montauban
- (Portugal) Steevy Cerqueira to (France) Béziers
- (France) Didier Tison to (France) RC Narbonne
- (New Zealand) Hoani Tui to (France) Oyonnax
- (France) Jean Baptiste Singer to (France) Biarritz Olympique
- (Australia) Damien Fitzpatrick to (Australia) NSW Waratahs
- (South Africa) Wian du Preez retired
- (Ivory Coast) Eugene N'Zi to (France) Nevers
- (France) Jérémy Gondrand to (France) Oyonnax
- (France) Jean-Philippe Bonrepaux retired
- (France) Karim Ghezal retired
- (New Zealand) Kendrick Lynn retired

== Montpellier ==
=== Players In ===
- (France) Alexandre Dumoulin from (France) Racing 92
- (Fiji) Nemani Nadolo from (New Zealand) Crusaders
- (Georgia (country)) Konstantin Mikautadze from (France) Toulon
- (Georgia (country)) Gagi Bazadze from (France) La Rochelle
- (France) Grégory Fichten from (France) RC Narbonne
- (France) Antoine Guillamon from (France) Oyonnax
- (France) Joffrey Michel from (France) USA Perpignan
- (France) Vincent Martin from (France) Oyonnax
- (New Zealand) Ben Botica from (England) Harlequins
- (South Africa) Henry Immelman from (South Africa) Free State Cheetahs
- (South Africa) Nico Janse van Rensburg from (South Africa) Bulls
- (Australia) Joe Tomane from (Australia) Brumbies
- (Georgia (country)) Shalva Mamukashvili from (Scotland) Glasgow Warriors
- (France) Romain Ruffenach from (France) Biarritz Olympique

=== Players Out ===
- (Australia) Sitaleki Timani to (France) Clermont Auvergne
- (France) Mickael Ivaldi to (France) Lyon
- (France) François Trinh-Duc to (France) Toulon
- (France) Nicolas Mas retired
- (France) Ilian Perraux to (France) Albi
- (South Africa) Pat Cilliers to (England) Leicester Tigers
- (Australia) Ben Mowen to (France) Pau
- (South Africa) Robert Ebersohn to (France) Castres Olympique
- (France) Martin Devergie to (France) US Colomiers
- (France) Oleg Ishchenko to (France) US Colomiers
- (New Zealand) Tom Donnelly to (France) Bayonne
- (France) Pierre Berard to (France) Castres Olympique
- (France) Thibaut Privat to (France) Lyon
- (New Zealand) Anthony Tuitavake to (France) Racing 92
- (France) Anthony Floch retired

== Pau ==
=== Players In ===
- (Samoa) Masalosalo Tutaia from (France) Mont-de-Marsan
- (Australia) Ben Mowen from (France) Montpellier
- (France) Julien Tomas from (France) Stade Français Paris
- (France) Ibrahim Diarra from (France) Castres Olympique
- (France) Fabrice Metz from (France) Oyonnax
- (France) Pierrick Gunther from (France) Oyonnax
- (Algeria) Malik Hamadache from (France) Albi
- (England) Steffon Armitage from (France) Toulon
- (New Zealand) Tom Taylor from (France) Toulon
- (New Zealand) Jamie Mackintosh from (United States) Ohio Aviators

=== Players Out ===
- (France) Mathieu Acebes to (France) USA Perpignan
- (Portugal) Samuel Marques to (France) Toulouse
- (Georgia (country)) Giorgi Natsarashvili to (France) US Carcassonne
- (New Zealand) Elijah Niko to (France) Béziers
- (Fiji) Josefa Domolailai to (France) US Carcassonne
- (France) Vincent Campo retired
- (France) Jean Bouilhou retired
- (France) Damien Traille retired
- (France) Baptiste Bonnet retired
- (Fiji) Sireli Bobo to (France) RC Strasbourg
- (Fiji) Marika Vunibaka Jr released

== Racing ==
=== Players In ===
- (Fiji) Leone Nakarawa from (Scotland) Glasgow Warriors
- (Samoa) Viliamu Afatia from (France) Agen
- (New Zealand) Anthony Tuitavake from (France) Montpellier
- (New Zealand) Ali Williams unattached
- (South Africa) Gerbrandt Grobler unattached

=== Players Out ===
- (France) Alexandre Dumoulin to (France) Montpellier
- (Wales) Luke Charteris to (England) Bath Rugby
- (France) Arthur Retière to (France) La Rochelle
- (France) Luc Barba to (France) Oyonnax
- (Wales) Mike Phillips to (England) Sale Sharks
- (France) Maxime Javaux to (France) Castres Olympique
- (South Africa) Juandré Kruger to (France) Toulon
- (Georgia (country)) Davit Khinchagishvili to (France) Bayonne
- (South Africa) Johan Goosen retired
- (Italy) Martin Castrogiovanni retired

== Stade Français ==
=== Players In ===
- (Fiji) Alipate Ratini from (France) La Rochelle

=== Players Out ===
- (France) Dany Priso to (France) La Rochelle
- (France) Julien Tomas to (France) Pau

== Toulon ==
=== Players In ===
- (France) François Trinh-Duc from (France) Montpellier
- (Australia) Liam Gill from (Australia) Queensland Reds
- (South Africa) Marcel van der Merwe from (South Africa) Bulls
- (France) Laurent Delboubes from (France) Oyonnax
- (France) Vincent Clerc from (France) Toulouse
- (France) Pierre Bernard from (France) Bordeaux Begles
- (Japan) Ayumu Goromaru from (Australia) Queensland Reds
- (South Africa) Aidon Davis from (South Africa) Southern Kings
- (South Africa) Juandré Kruger from (France) Racing 92

=== Players Out ===
- (France) Theo Belan to (France) Lyon
- (Georgia (country)) Konstantin Mikautadze to (France) Montpellier
- (Ireland) Paul O'Connell retired
- (Australia) Lachlan Turner to (England) Exeter Chiefs
- (France) Alexandre Menini to (France) Lyon
- (France) Virgile Bruni to (France) Lyon
- (England) Delon Armitage to (France) Lyon
- (France) Mohamed Boughanmi to (France) La Rochelle
- (Australia) UJ Seuteni to (France) Oyonnax
- (France) Frédéric Michalak to (France) Lyon
- (England) Steffon Armitage to (France) Pau
- (France) Thibault Lasselle to (France) Castres Olympique
- (New Zealand) Tom Taylor to (France) Pau
- (Australia) Quade Cooper to (Australia) Queensland Reds

== Toulouse ==
=== Players In ===
- (Scotland) Richie Gray from (France) Castres Olympique
- (France) Sofiane Guitoune from (France) Bordeaux Begles
- (Italy) Leonardo Ghiraldini from (England) Leicester Tigers
- (Samoa) Piula Faʻasalele from (France) Castres Olympique
- (Portugal) Samuel Marques from (France) Pau
- (South Africa) Maks van Dyk from (South Africa) Cheetahs

=== Players Out ===
- (France) Louis Picamoles to (England) Northampton Saints
- (France) David Mélé to (France) Grenoble
- (New Zealand) Corey Flynn to (Scotland) Glasgow Warriors
- (France) Romain Millo-Chluski to (France) USA Perpignan
- (France) Thomas Ramos to (France) US Colomiers
- (France) Clément Poitrenaud to (South Africa) Sharks
- (France) Imanol Harinordoquy retired
- (France) Vincent Clerc to (France) Toulon
- (Fiji) Timoci Matanavou to (France) USA Perpignan

== See also ==
- List of 2016–17 Premiership Rugby transfers
- List of 2016–17 Pro12 transfers
- List of 2016–17 RFU Championship transfers
- List of 2016–17 Super Rugby transfers
