= 2016 European Rugby Champions Cup final =

2016 European Rugby Champions Cup Final
- Event: 2015–16 European Rugby Champions Cup
Racing 92	Saracens
(France)	(England)
9	21
- Date: 14 May 2016
- Venue: Grand Stade de Lyon, Lyon
- Man of the Match: Maro Itoje (Saracens)
- Referee: Nigel Owens (Wales)
- Attendance: 58,017

The 2016 European Rugby Champions Cup Final was the final match in the 2015–16 European Rugby Champions Cup, and the twenty-first European club rugby final in general. It was contested by French side Racing 92, and Saracens of England, at the Grand Stade de Lyon, in the Lyon suburb of Décines, France, on Saturday 14 May 2016.

Saracens defeated Racing 92 by 21 points to 9. This was the first European Cup win for Saracens, making them the first new champions since Toulon, whose first victory in what was then known as the Heineken Cup came in 2013.

== Background ==
Prior to the draw for the 2015–16 tournament, it was announced that Lyon would host the 2015–16 European Rugby Challenge Cup and Champions Cup finals at the newly built Grand Stade de Lyon, while the 2017 finals would be held at Murrayfield Stadium in Edinburgh, Scotland. Two weeks before the match, Nigel Owens was chosen to referee the final. This was Racing's first European Cup final, while Saracens were previously defeated by Toulon in the 2014 Heineken Cup Final. The two teams last met in the tournament the previous season, with Saracens having defeated Racing 92 at the quarter-final stage with a last-minute penalty kick.

== Route to the final ==
Note: In all results below, the score of the finalist is given first (H: home; A: away).

(France) Racing 92		Round	(England) Saracens	
Opponent	Result	Pool stage	Opponent	Result
(Scotland) Glasgow Warriors (Note: Due to the terrorist attacks that took place in Paris on 13 November 2015, the Round 1 match between Racing 92 v Glasgow Warriors was postponed from 14 November 2015 to 9 January 2016.)	34–10 (H)	Matchday 1	(France) Toulouse	32–7 (H)
(Wales) Scarlets	29–12 (A)	Matchday 2	(Ireland) Ulster	27–9 (A)
(England) Northampton Saints	33–3 (H)	Matchday 3	(France) Oyonnax	45–10 (A)
(England) Northampton Saints	9–9 (A)	Matchday 4	(France) Oyonnax	55–13 (H)
(Wales) Scarlets	64–14 (H)	Matchday 5	(Ireland) Ulster	33–17 (H)
(Scotland) Glasgow Warriors	5–22 (A)	Matchday 6	(France) Toulouse	28–17 (A)
Pool 3 winner: Team / P / Pts; (France) Racing 92 / 6 / 22; (England) Northampton Saints / 6 / 19; (Scotland) Glasgow Warriors / 6 / 14; (Wales) Scarlets / 6 / 2		Final standings	Pool 1 winner: Team / P / Pts; (England) Saracens / 6 / 28; (Ireland) Ulster / 6 / 18; (France) Oyonnax / 6 / 7; (France) Toulouse / 6 / 5	
Opponent	Result	Knock-out stage	Opponent	Result
(France) Toulon	19–16 (H)	Quarter-finals	(England) Northampton Saints	29–20 (H)
(England) Leicester Tigers	19–16 (A)	Semi-finals	(England) Wasps	24–17 (H)

=== Racing 92 ===
In the pool stages, fifth-seeds Racing 92 topped Pool 3, winning four of six games. Their first match with Glasgow Warriors was postponed for two months due to the November 2015 Paris attacks, but they went on to win their first two fixtures. After drawing 9–9 with Northampton Saints and winning the postponed match 34–10, Racing 92 inflicted a heavy 64–14 away defeat on the Scarlets. Racing lost their final match 22–5 away at against the Warriors, which was relocated from Scotstoun Stadium to Rugby Park due to heavy rainfall.

On April 10, in the quarter-finals, Racing 92 hosted Toulon at Stade Yves-du-Manoir and narrowly won by 19–16. Two weeks later, they won in the semi-finals by the same scoreline against Leicester Tigers at City Ground in Nottingham, England.

=== Saracens ===
Seeded first, Saracens won Pool 1 after winning all six of their matches. In the quarter-finals, they won 29–20 against Northampton Saints at Allianz Park on 9 April, with tries from Chris Ashton and Chris Wyles. Both were converted by Owen Farrell, who also scored all five of their penalties. Two weeks later, Saracens won their semi-final 24–17 against Wasps at the Madejski Stadium in Reading, England.

== Match ==
=== Summary ===
The game was played mostly during a heavy rain storm, and featured no tries. Racing 92 scrum-half Maxime Machenaud missed an early penalty kick, allowing Saracens fly-half Owen Farrell to score first, hitting a drop goal from close range to give the Saracens a 3–0 lead. After winning a scrum deep in the Saracens half, Racing 92 outside-centre Johan Goosen drew the score level 3–3 at 17 minutes. Machenaud was removed from play under concussion regulations on 22 minutes. Farrell scored on a two successive penalties to make the score 9–3 in favour of Saracens. Just before the end of the half, Goosen and Farrell traded penalties to make the score 12–6.

Racing 92 fly-half Dan Carter was substituted shortly after half-time, having aggravated his leg injury. Farrell scored another penalty early in the second half to extend the lead to 15–6. As Racing 92 became more aggressive following the 60 minute mark, Goosen scored his third penalty of the game to bring the score to 15–9. Farrell would preserve the lead for Saracens, by scoring two more penalties; once in the 76th minute, and once in the 79th minute for a final score of 21–9 in favour of Saracens.

Saracens lock Maro Itoje was named Man of the Match, and he also received the European Player of the Year award. Saracens became the first team to win the competition with a 100 per cent win rate across all of their matches.

=== Details ===
14 May 2016
17:45

Racing 92 (France)	9–21	(England) Saracens
Pen: Goosen (3/3) 18', 36', 58'	Report	Pen: Farrell (7/7) 10', 25', 32', 39', 51', 76', 79'

Grand Stade de Lyon, Lyon
Attendance: 58,017
Referee: Nigel Owens (WRU)

Racing 92
Saracens

FB	15	(France) Brice Dulin
RW	14	(New Zealand) Joe Rokocoko
OC	13	(South Africa) Johan Goosen
IC	12	(France) Alexandre Dumoulin	(substituted off) 57'
LW	11	(Argentina) Juan Imhoff
FH	10	(New Zealand) Dan Carter	(substituted off) 42'
SH	9	(France) Maxime Machenaud	(substituted off) 22'
N8	8	(New Zealand) Chris Masoe
OF	7	(France) Bernard Le Roux	(substituted off) 77'
BF	6	(France) Wenceslas Lauret
RL	5	(South Africa) François van der Merwe	(substituted off) 66'
LL	4	(Wales) Luke Charteris
TP	3	(Tonga) Ben Tameifuna	(substituted off) 68'
HK	2	(France) Dimitri Szarzewski (c)	(substituted off) 66'
LP	1	(France) Eddy Ben Arous	(substituted off) 76'
Substitutions:
HK	16	(France) Virgile Lacombe	(substituted in) 66'
PR	17	(France) Khatchik Vartanov	(substituted in) 76'
PR	18	(France) Luc Ducalcon	(substituted in) 68'
LK	19	(Argentina) Manuel Carizza	(substituted in) 66'
N8	20	(France) Antonie Claassen	(substituted in) 77'
SH	21	(Wales) Mike Phillips	(substituted in) 22'
FH	22	(France) Rémi Talès	(substituted in) 42'
CE	23	(France) Henry Chavancy	(substituted in) 57'
Coach:
(France) Laurent Labit			(France) Laurent Travers

FB	15	(England) Alex Goode
RW	14	(England) Chris Ashton
OC	13	(Scotland) Duncan Taylor	(substituted off) 77'
IC	12	(England) Brad Barritt (c)
LW	11	(United States) Chris Wyles
FH	10	(England) Owen Farrell	(substituted off) 80'
SH	9	(England) Richard Wigglesworth	(substituted off) 80'
N8	8	(England) Billy Vunipola	(substituted off) 43'	(substituted in) 51'
OF	7	(England) Will Fraser
BF	6	(South Africa) Michael Rhodes			(substituted off) 55'
RL	5	(England) George Kruis
LL	4	(England) Maro Itoje	(substituted off) 80'
TP	3	(South Africa) Petrus du Plessis	(substituted off) 68'
HK	2	(South Africa) Schalk Brits	(substituted off) 22'	(substituted in) 31'	(substituted off) 52'
LP	1	(England) Mako Vunipola	(substituted off) 77'
Substitutions:
HK	16	(England) Jamie George	(substituted in) 22'	(substituted off) 31'	(substituted in) 52'
PR	17	(England) Richard Barrington	(substituted in) 77'
PR	18	(Argentina) Juan Figallo	(substituted in) 68'
LK	19	(Scotland) Jim Hamilton	(substituted in) 80'
FL	20	(England) Jackson Wray	(substituted in) 43'	(substituted off) 51'	(substituted in) 55'
SH	21	(England) Ben Spencer	(substituted in) 80'
FH	22	(England) Charlie Hodgson	(substituted in) 80'
CE	23	(Argentina) Marcelo Bosch	(substituted in) 77'
Coach:
(Ireland) Mark McCall

Man of the Match:
(England) Maro Itoje (Saracens)

Assistant referees:
George Clancy (Ireland)
Leighton Hodges (Wales)
Television match official:
Simon McDowell (Ireland)
