= Gagi =

Gagi may refer to:

== People ==
- Gagi Bazadze (born 1992), Georgian rugby player

== Places ==
- Gagi, India
- Gagi Fortress, Georgia
