= 2015–16 European Rugby Champions Cup pool stage =

- Season: 2015–16 European Rugby Champions Cup
- Date: 13 November 2015 – 24 January 2016

Qualifiers
- Seed 1: (England) Saracens
- Seed 2: (England) Leicester Tigers
- Seed 3: (France) Racing 92
- Seed 4: (England) Wasps
- Seed 5: (England) Exeter Chiefs
- Seed 6: (France) Toulon
- Seed 7: (France) Stade Français
- Seed 8: (England) Northampton Saints

The 2015–16 European Rugby Champions Cup pool stage was the first stage of the 21st season of European club rugby union, and the second under the European Rugby Champions Cup format.

It involved 20 teams competing, across 5 pools of 4 teams, for 8 quarter-final places – awarded to the 5 pool winners and the 3 top-ranked pool runners-up.

The pool stage began on the weekend of 13 November 2015 but several games were postponed following the November 2015 Paris attacks. It was completed on the weekend of 23–25 January 2016.

== Seeding ==
Twenty teams were seeded based on their performance in the three major European domestic leagues - the Premiership, the Pro12 and the Top 14. Teams were seeded based on their performance in the regular season, and, where applicable, subsequent play-off to determine a league champion. Where teams were eliminated in the same round of a knock-out tournament, their league position at the end of the regular season determined which team received a higher seed.

Rank	Top 14	Premiership	Pro 12
1	(France) Stade Français	(England) Saracens	(Scotland) Glasgow Warriors
2	(France) Clermont	(England) Bath	(Ireland) Munster
3	(France) Toulon	(England) Northampton Saints	(Wales) Ospreys
4	(France) Toulouse	(England) Leicester Tigers	(Ireland) Ulster
5	(France) Racing 92	(England) Exeter Chiefs	(Ireland) Leinster
6	(France) Oyonnax	(England) Wasps	(Wales) Scarlets
7	(France) Bordeaux Bègles		(Italy) Benetton Treviso

Teams were then placed into 4 Tiers, each containing 5 teams, based on their seeding. A draw determined which two second seeded teams completed Tier 1, and based on this, the fourth seeded teams were allocated to either Tier 2 and Tier 3.

The brackets show each team's seeding and their league (for example, 1 Top 14 indicates the team was seeded 1st from the Top 14).

Tier 1	(England) Saracens (1 AP)	(Scotland) Glasgow Warriors (1 Pro12)	(France) Stade Français (1 Top 14)	(France) Clermont (2 Top 14)	(England) Bath (2 AP)
Tier 2	(Ireland) Munster (2 Pro12)	(England) Northampton Saints (3 AP)	(Wales) Ospreys (3 Pro12)	(France) Toulon (3 Top 14)	(Ireland) Ulster (4 Pro12)
Tier 3	(France) Toulouse (4 Top 14)	(England) Leicester Tigers (4 AP)	(England) Exeter Chiefs (5 AP)	(Ireland) Leinster (5 Pro12)	(France) Racing 92 (5 Top 14)
Tier 4	(Wales) Scarlets (6 Pro12)	(England) Wasps (6 AP)	(France) Oyonnax (6 Top 14)	(Italy) Benetton Treviso (7 Pro12)	(France) Bordeaux Bègles (Play-Off)

== Pool stage ==
The draw took place on 17 June 2015, at the Château de Neuchâtel, in Neuchâtel, Switzerland.

During the pool stage, the teams will play the 3 other teams in their pool twice, both at home and away, Based on the result of the match, teams receive competition points as follows:

- 4 points for a win,
- 2 points for a draw,
- 1 attacking bonus point for scoring four or more tries in a match,
- 1 defensive bonus point for losing a match by seven points or less.

Following the pool stage, the five winners from each group progress to the quarter-finals, along with the three best pool runners-up from the competition (the three of the five runners-up with the highest number of competition points). To seed the quarter-finals, the five pool winners will be ranked 1st to 5th and the three best-placed runners-up ranked 6th to 8th, based on who got the most competition points. In the event of a tie between two or more teams from the same pool, the following criteria would be used as tie-breakers:

1. The club with the greater number of competition points from only matches involving tied teams.
2. If equal, the club with the best aggregate points difference from those matches.
3. If equal, the club that scored the most tries in those matches.

If this did not separate teams, and/or the tie related to teams that did not play each other (i.e., in different pools), the following tie breakers would be used:

1. If equal, the club with the best aggregate points difference from the pool stage.
2. The club that scored the most tries in the pool stage.
3. If equal, the club with the fewest players suspended in the pool stage.
4. If equal, the drawing of lots will determine a club's ranking.

Key to colours
Winner of each pool, advance to quarter-finals.
Three highest-scoring second-place teams advance to quarter-finals.
Cannot advance to the quarter-finals.

=== Pool 1 ===
Team	P	W	D	L	PF	PA	Diff	TF	TA	TB	LB	Pts
(England) Saracens (1)	6	6	0	0	220	73	+147	26	8	4	0	28
(Ireland) Ulster	6	4	0	2	169	109	+60	21	12	2	0	18
(France) Oyonnax	6	1	0	5	99	218	–119	10	30	1	2	7
(France) Toulouse	6	1	0	5	85	173	–88	11	18	0	1	5

14 November 2015
14:00

Oyonnax (France)	P–P (Note: Due to the terrorist attacks that took place in Paris on 13 November 2015, all matches that were due to take place in France on 14 and 15 November were postponed.)	(Ireland) Ulster

Stade Charles-Mathon
Referee: Luke Pearce (RFU)

14 November 2015
17:15

Saracens (England)	32–7	(France) Toulouse
Try: M. Vunipola 14' c Wyles (2) 36' m, 41' m Con: Farrell (1/3) 15'; Pen: Farrell (5/5) 5', 11', 21', 24', 32'	Report	Try: Tolofua 49' c Con: Bézy (1/1) 51'

Allianz Park
Attendance: 9,674
Referee: George Clancy (IRFU)

20 November 2015
19:45

Ulster (Ireland)	9–27	(England) Saracens (1 BP)
Pen: Jackson (2/2) 15', 25'; Drop: Jackson 20'	Report	Try: Wyles 29' m Goode 59' c Taylor 64' m B. Vunipola 79' c Con: Farrell (1/3) 60'; Hodgson (1/1) 80'; Pen: Farrell (1/3) 73'

Kingspan Stadium
Attendance: 17,209
Referee: Romain Poite (FFR)

21 November 2015
16:15

Toulouse (France)	24–18	(France) Oyonnax (1 BP)
Try: Matanavou 43' c Médard 60' c Fickou 74' c Con: McAlister (3/3) 43', 60', 74'; Pen: McAlister (1/1) 14'	Report	Try: Martin 70' m Cibray 76' c Con: Robinson (1/2) 76'; Pen: Lespinas (2/2) 8', 10'

Stade Ernest-Wallon
Attendance: 10,469
Referee: Matthew Carley (RFU)

11 December 2015
19:45

(1 BP) Ulster (Ireland)	38–0	(France) Toulouse
Try: Williams 22' c Trimble 38' c Marshall 44' c McCloskey 53' c Henry 70' c Con: Jackson (4/4) 23', 39', 45', 53'; Humphreys (1/1) 72'; Pen: Jackson (1/1) 29'	Report

Kingspan Stadium
Attendance: 16,016
Referee: Wayne Barnes (RFU)

13 December 2015
14:00

Oyonnax (France)	10–45	(England) Saracens (1 BP)
Try: Aziza 75' c Con: Lespinas (1/1) 77'; Pen: Clegg (1/3) 30'	Report	Try: Penalty try 18' c Goode 32' c Wyles 36' c Itoje 48' c Wigglesworth 50' c Brits 80' c Con: Farrell (7/7) 18', 33', 37', 49', 51'; Hodgson (1/1) 80'; Pen: Farrell (1/2) 7'

Stade Charles-Mathon
Attendance: 8,800
Referee: Marius Mitrea (FIR)

19 December 2015
13:00

(1 BP) Saracens (England)	55–13	(France) Oyonnax
Try: Ashton (3) 12' c, 29' m, 75' c Vunisa (2) 40' m, 43' c Goode 48' c Ellery 51' c George 60' c Con: Farrell (4/6) 13', 43', 49', 51'; Hodgson (2/2) 61', 77'; Pen: Farrell (1/1) 25'	Report	Try: Vainikolo 66' c Con: Clegg (1/1) 67'; Pen: Lespinas (2/2) 15', 33'

Allianz Park
Attendance: 9,207
Referee: George Clancy (IRFU)

20 December 2015
14:00

(1 BP) Toulouse (France)	23–25	(Ireland) Ulster
Try: Fickou 50' c Picamoles 78' c Con: Bézy (1/1) 51'; Doussain (1/1) 79'; Pen: Bézy (3/3) 36', 42', 55'	Report	Try: Pienaar 31' c Trimble 45' m Marshall 74' c Con: Jackson (2/3) 32', 75'; Pen: Jackson (2/3) 2', 59'

Stade Ernest-Wallon
Attendance: 13,852
Referee: JP Doyle (RFU)

10 January 2016
14:00

(1 BP) Oyonnax (France)	23–24	(Ireland) Ulster
Try: Maurouard 7' c Tawalo 38' c Con: Robinson (2/2) 8', 39'; Pen: Robinson (3/3) 14', 28', 33'	Report	Try: Scholes 43' c Gilroy 61' c McCall 67' c Con: Jackson (3/3) 44', 62', 68'; Pen: Jackson (1/1) 77'

Stade Charles-Mathon
Attendance: 7,500
Referee: Luke Pearce (RFU)

16 January 2016
15:15

(1 BP) Saracens (England)	33–17	(Ireland) Ulster
Try: Vunipola 37' c Taylor 52' m Itoje 58' m Brits 62' m Con: Farrell (2/4) 38', 63'; Pen: Farrell (3/5) 2', 20', 48'	Report	Try: Marshall 4' c Humphreys 70' c Con: Jackson (1/1) 5'; Humphreys (1/1) 70'; Pen: Jackson (1/2) 44'

Allianz Park
Attendance: 9,642
Referee: Jérôme Garcès (FFR)

16 January 2016
16:15

(1 BP) Oyonnax (France)	32–14	(France) Toulouse
Try: Tian 1' c Tuwalo 11' c Cibray 48' m Sheridan 75' m Con: Robinson (2/3) 1', 12'; Lespinas (1/2) 72'; Pen: Robinson (1/1) 21'; Lespinas (1/1) 70'	Report	Try: Galan (2) 32' c, 47' c Con: Mélé (2/2) 33', 48'

Stade Charles-Mathon
Attendance: 7,200
Referee: Greg Garner (RFU)

23 January 2016
13:00

(1 BP) Ulster (Ireland)	56–3	(France) Oyonnax
Try: Herring 1' c Cave 17' c Scholes 26' c Reidy 38' c Gilroy 47' c Diack 54' c Humphreys 58' c Payne 60' c Con: Jackson (5/5) 2', 18', 27', 39', 48'; Humphreys (3/3) 55', 58', 61'	Report	Pen: Clegg (1/2) 9'

Kingspan Stadium
Attendance: 15,108
Referee: Marius Mitrea (FIR)

23 January 2016
14:00

Toulouse (France)	17–28	(England) Saracens
Try: McAlister (2) 37' c, 60' m Médard 70' m Con: Flood (1/3) 37'	Report	Try: Spencer 45' c Con: Farrell (1/1) 46'; Pen: Hodgson (2/2) 7', 25'; Farrell (4/4) 44', 67', 73', 80'; Drop: Hodgson (1/1) 11'

Stadium Municipal
Attendance: 12,498
Referee: Nigel Owens (WRU)

=== Pool 2 ===
Team	P	W	D	L	PF	PA	Diff	TF	TA	TB	LB	Pts
(England) Exeter Chiefs (5)	6	3	0	3	148	151	–3	18	18	3	1	16
(France) Bordeaux Bègles	6	3	0	3	149	163	–14	18	19	3	1	16
(Wales) Ospreys	6	3	0	3	138	142	–4	12	16	2	2	16
(France) Clermont	6	3	0	3	159	138	+21	19	14	3	0	15

15 November 2015
14:00

Bordeaux Bègles (France)	P–P	(France) Clermont

Stade Chaban-Delmas
Referee: Peter Fitzgibbon (IRFU)

15 November 2015
17:15

Ospreys (Wales)	25–13	(England) Exeter Chiefs
Try: Matavesi 71' c Con: Biggar (1/1) 72'; Pen: Biggar (5/8) 7', 18', 42', 48', 68'; Drop: Biggar 61'	Report	Try: Short 31' c Con: Steenson (1/1) 32'; Pen: Steenson (2/2) 24', 58'

Liberty Stadium
Attendance: 7,969
Referee: Marius Mitrea (FIR)

21 November 2015
19:45

(1 BP) Exeter Chiefs (England)	34–19	(France) Bordeaux Bègles
Try: Woodburn (2) 10' m, 58' m Low 19' c Whitten 43' m Con: Slade (1/4) 19'; Pen: Slade (4/4) 9', 22', 40', 73'	Report	Try: Ducuing 16' c Rey 51' m Lesgourgues 63' c Con: Beauxis (1/2) 16'; Lonca (1/1) 63'

Sandy Park
Attendance: 9,577
Referee: Leighton Hodges (WRU)

22 November 2015
14:00

(1 BP) Clermont (France)	34–29	(Wales) Ospreys (2 BP)
Try: Strettle (2) 26' c, 67' c Rougerie 36' c Fofana 75' c Con: Lopez (2/2) 26', 36'; Parra (2/2) 67', 75'; Pen: Lopez (2/2) 17', 40'	Report	Try: Tipuric 49' c Walker 51' c Parry 79' m Habberfield 80' c Con: Biggar (3/4) 49', 51', 80'; Drop: Biggar 16'

Stade Marcel-Michelin
Attendance: 16,838
Referee: George Clancy (IRFU)

12 December 2015
17:15

Ospreys (Wales)	19–16	(France) Bordeaux Bègles (1 BP)
Try: Biggar 51' c Con: Biggar (1/1) 52'; Pen: Biggar (4/4) 3', 15', 35', 42'	Report	Try: Le Bourhis 30' c Con: Bernard (1/1) 31'; Pen: Bernard (2/2) 5', 24'; Lonca (1/2) 56'

Liberty Stadium
Attendance: 8,733
Referee: JP Doyle (RFU)

12 December 2015
17:15

(1 BP) Exeter Chiefs (England)	31–14	(France) Clermont
Try: Waldrom (2) 34' c, 46' c Armand 73' c Lees 80' c Con: Steenson (4/4) 35', 47', 74', 80'; Pen: Steenson (1/1) 13'	Report	Try: Gear 8' c Rougerie 18' c Con: Parra (2/2) 9', 19'

Sandy Park
Attendance: 10,930
Referee: John Lacey (IRFU)

19 December 2015
18:15

(1 BP) Bordeaux Bègles (France)	33–27	(Wales) Ospreys (2 BP)
Try: Rey 1' c Botha 19' m Guitoune 32' c Lesgourgues 64' m Con: Bernard (2/3) 1', 33'; Pen: Bernard (2/3) 8', 24'; Serin (1/1) 80'	Report	Try: Tipuric 3' c Walker 51' m A. Jones 68' m Biggar 73' c Con: Biggar (2/3) 4', 74'; Pen: Biggar (1/1) 39'

Stade Chaban-Delmas
Attendance: 20,152
Referee: Luke Pearce (RFU)

20 December 2015
16:15

(1 BP) Clermont (France)	42–10	(England) Exeter Chiefs
Try: Strettle 10' c Lapandry 36' m Lee 42' c Vahaamahina 49' c Davies 62' c Con: Parra (3/4) 11', 44', 64'; Lopez (1/1) 50'; Pen: Parra (2/2) 5', 18'; Spedding (1/1) 8'	Report	Try: Johnson 72' c Con: Hooley (1/1) 72'; Pen: Steenson (1/3) 3'

Stade Marcel-Michelin
Attendance: 16,768
Referee: Marius Mitrea (FIR)

8 January 2016
20:45

Bordeaux Bègles (France)	10–28	(France) Clermont
Try: Maynadier 32' c Con: Beauxis (1/1) 33'; Pen: Beauxis (1/1) 10'	Report	Try: Abendanon 17' c Lopez 37' c Nakaitaci 70' m Con: Parra (2/3) 18', 39'; Pen: Parra (3/4) 28', 44', 48'

Stade Chaban-Delmas
Attendance: 28,483
Referee: Peter Fitzgibbon (IRFU)

15 January 2016
19:45

Ospreys (Wales)	21–13	(France) Clermont
Pen: Biggar (2/4) 8', 17'; S. Davies (4/4) 58', 67', 70', 78'; Drop: S. Davies (1/2) 62'	Report	Try: Fofana 5' c Con: Parra (1/1) 6'; Pen: Parra (2/3) 19', 37'

Liberty Stadium
Attendance: 9,479
Referee: Wayne Barnes (RFU)

16 January 2016
14:00

(1 BP) Bordeaux Bègles (France)	34–27	(England) Exeter Chiefs (1 BP)
Try: Ashley-Cooper 13' m Connor 16' m Madaule 28' c Auzqui 55' c Tauleigne 70' c Con: Bernard (1/3) 29'; Beauxis (2/2) 56', 70'; Pen: Bernard (1/1) 22'	Report	Try: Lewis 26' c McGuigan 30' c Bodilly 59' c Con: Hooley (3/3) 28', 32', 60'; Pen: Hooley (2/2) 3', 40'

Stade Chaban-Delmas
Attendance: 17,233
Referee: John Lacey (IRFU)

24 January 2016
15:15

(1 BP) Exeter Chiefs (England)	33–17	(Wales) Ospreys
Try: Horstmann 2' c Waldrom (2) 9' c, 78' c Short (2) 51' m, 64' c Con: Steenson (3/4) 3', 10', 66'; Hooley (1/1) 79'	Report	Try: Dirksen 7' c Penalty try 70' c Con: Biggar (2/2) 8', 71'; Pen: Biggar (1/2) 45'

Sandy Park
Attendance: 11,415
Referee: Jérôme Garcès (FFR)

24 January 2016
16:15

(1 BP) Clermont (France)	28–37	(France) Bordeaux Bègles (1 BP)
Try: Davies 1' c Nakaitaci 3' c Chouly 54' c Jedrasiak 62' c Con: Parra (4/4) 1', 4', 55', 63'	Report	Try: Botha 13' c Taofifénua 19' c Riva 68' c Saili 73' c Con: Beauxis (2/2) 13', 20'; Bernard (2/2) 69', 74'; Pen: Serin (2/2) 40', 47'; Bernard (1/1) 77'

Stade Marcel-Michelin
Attendance: 15,702
Referee: JP Doyle (RFU)

=== Pool 3 ===
Team	P	W	D	L	PF	PA	Diff	TF	TA	TB	LB	Pts
(France) Racing 92 (3)	6	4	1	1	174	70	+104	23	6	4	0	22
(England) Northampton Saints (8)	6	4	1	1	94	93	+1	12	9	1	0	19
(Scotland) Glasgow Warriors	6	3	0	3	114	96	+18	10	11	1	1	14
(Wales) Scarlets	6	0	0	6	59	182	–123	7	25	0	2	2

14 November 2015
16:15

Racing 92 (France)	P–P	(Scotland) Glasgow Warriors

Stade Yves-du-Manoir
Referee: JP Doyle (RFU)

14 November 2015
19:45

Northampton Saints (England)	15–11	(Wales) Scarlets (1 BP)
Try: K. Pisi 6' c Waller 54' m Con: Hanrahan (1/2) 7'; Pen: Hanrahan (1/3) 68'	Report	Try: G. Davies 50' m Pen: S. Shingler (2/3) 14', 37'

Franklin's Gardens
Attendance: 14,512
Referee: Romain Poite (FFR)

21 November 2015
17:15

Scarlets (Wales)	12–29	(France) Racing 92 (1 BP)
Try: Thomas 57' m Rawlins 66' c Con: Thomas (1/2) 66'	Report	Try: Machenaud 7' m Rokocoko 17' c Masoe 27' c Andreu 38' c Con: Machenaud (3/4) 18', 28', 40'; Pen: Goosen (1/1) 69'

Parc y Scarlets
Attendance: 8,512
Referee: Greg Garner (RFU)

21 November 2015
17:15

Glasgow Warriors (Scotland)	15–26	(England) Northampton Saints
Try: P. Horne 33' c Strauss 57' m Con: Russell (1/2) 35'; Pen: Russell (1/3) 5'	Report	Try: G. Pisi 7' c Tuala (2) 29' m, 51' m Con: Myler (1/3) 7'; Pen: Myler (3/3) 15', 21', 40'

Scotstoun Stadium
Attendance: 6,800
Referee: Pascal Gaüzère (FFR)

12 December 2015
13:00

(1 BP) Glasgow Warriors (Scotland)	43–6	(Wales) Scarlets
Try: Weir 6' c Malcolm 52' c Naiyaravoro (3) 56' c, 69' c, 73' m Swinson 80' c Con: Weir (2/2) 7', 53'; Russell (3/4) 57' 70' 80'; Pen: Weir (1/1) 39'	Report	Pen: Shingler (2/2) 11', 46'

Scotstoun Stadium
Attendance: 6,576
Referee: Mathieu Raynal (FFR)

12 December 2015
16:15

(1 BP) Racing 92 (France)	33–3	(England) Northampton Saints
Try: Chavancy 13' c Ben Arous 18' c Dulin (2) 35' c, 43' m Imhoff 74' c Con: Carter (3/4) 14', 20', 37'; Goosen (1/1) 75'	Report	Pen: Hanrahan (1/1) 29'

Stade Yves-du-Manoir
Attendance: 8,733
Referee: George Clancy (IRFU)

18 December 2015
19:45

Northampton Saints (England)	9–9	(France) Racing 92
Pen: Myler (3/4) 10', 51', 61'	Report	Pen: Carter (3/3) 18', 28', 59'

Franklin's Gardens
Attendance: 15,064
Referee: Nigel Owens (WRU)

19 December 2015
19:45

(1 BP) Scarlets (Wales)	6–9	(Scotland) Glasgow Warriors
Pen: Thomas (2/4) 54', 67'	Report	Pen: Russell (3/4) 4', 26', 45'

Parc y Scarlets
Attendance: 5,767
Referee: Pascal Gaüzère (FFR)

9 January 2016
13:00

(1 BP) Racing 92 (France)	34–10	(Scotland) Glasgow Warriors
Try: Tameifuna 28' c Szarzewski 43' c Ben Arous 50' c Carizza 80' c Con: Carter (3/3) 29', 44', 51'; Goosen (1/1) 80'; Pen: Carter (2/2) 24', 38'	Report	Try: Nakarawa 59' c Con: Russell (1/1) 59'; Pen: Russell (1/2) 14'

Stade Yves-du-Manoir
Attendance: 8,133
Referee: John Lacey (IRFU)

17 January 2016
14:00

(1 BP) Racing 92 (France)	64–14	(Wales) Scarlets
Try: Imhoff (2) 12' c, 59' c Laulala (3) 23' c, 39' c, 77' c Claassen 26' c Dupichot 32' c Penalty try 56' c Goosen 69' m Con: Carter (5/5) 14', 25', 28', 34', 40'; Dulin (2/2) 56', 60'; Goosen (1/2) 79'; Pen: Carter (1/1) 8'	Report	Try: Van der Merwe 41' c G. Davies 50' c Con: Shingler (2/2) 42', 51'

Stade Yves-du-Manoir
Attendance: 6,931
Referee: Matthew Carley (RFU)

17 January 2016
17:30

Northampton Saints (England)	19–15	(Scotland) Glasgow Warriors (1 BP)
Try: Harrison 9' c Day 51' m Mallinder 78' c Con: Hanrahan (1/2) 10'; Myler (1/1) 80'	Report	Pen: Russell (4/6) 23', 32', 47', 56'; Hogg (1/2) 70'

Franklin's Gardens
Attendance: 14,874
Referee: Romain Poite (FFR)

23 January 2016
17:30

Glasgow Warriors (Scotland)	22–5	(France) Racing 92
Try: Hogg 55' c Con: Russell (1/1) 56'; Pen: Russell (3/3) 7', 47', 61'; Weir (2/2) 69', 76'	Report	Try: Khinchagishvili 65' m Con: Dulin (0/1)

Rugby Park
Attendance: 9,063
Referee: Wayne Barnes (RFU)

23 January 2016
17:30

Scarlets (Wales)	10–22	(England) Northampton Saints (1 BP)
Try: R. Jones 79' c Con: Thomas (1/1) 80'; Pen: Thomas (1/1) 27'	Report	Try: Mallinder 12' c G. Pisi 20' m S. Dickinson 46' m North 55' m Con: Myler (1/4) 12'

Parc y Scarlets
Attendance: 6,823
Referee: Pascal Gaüzère (FFR)

=== Pool 4 ===
Team	P	W	D	L	PF	PA	Diff	TF	TA	TB	LB	Pts
(England) Leicester Tigers (2)	6	5	0	1	185	91	+94	24	11	3	0	23
(France) Stade Français (7)	6	4	0	2	186	118	+68	25	17	3	0	19
(Ireland) Munster	6	3	0	3	118	100	+18	15	11	3	0	15
(Italy) Benetton Treviso	6	0	0	6	53	233	–180	8	33	0	0	0

13 November 2015
19:45

(1 BP) Leicester Tigers (England)	33–20	(France) Stade Français
Try: Goneva 34' c Smith 40' m O'Connor 41' m B. Youngs 55' c Con: O. Williams (2/4) 35', 56'; Pen: O. Williams (2/2) 47', 71'; Bai (1/1) 80'	Report	Try: Tomas 24' m P. Williams 52' c Arias 75' m Con: Steyn (1/3) 53'; Pen: Steyn (1/1) 29'

Welford Road
Attendance: 20,286
Referee: Mathieu Raynal (FFR)

14 November 2015
17:15

(1 BP) Munster (Ireland)	32–7	(Italy) Benetton Treviso
Try: Botha 4' c Stander 55' m Casey 68' c Zebo 75' c Con: Keatley (3/4) 5', 69', 77'; Pen: Keatley (2/2) 19', 48'	Report	Try: Steyn 16' c Con: Hayward (1/1) 16'

Thomond Park
Attendance: 17,763
Referee: Matthew Carley (RFU)

21 November 2015
14:00

Benetton Treviso (Italy)	3–36	(England) Leicester Tigers (1 BP)
Pen: Ambrosini (1/1) 38'	Report	Try: Penalty try 18' c Veainu (2) 35' m, 67' c Betham 40' c Bateman 79' c Con: Bell (3/4) 19', 40', 68'; Bai (1/1) 80'; Pen: Bell (1/1) 6'

Stadio Comunale di Monigo
Attendance: 2,300
Referee: Mathieu Raynal (FFR)

22 November 2015
16:15

Stade Français (France)	P–P (Note: Due to the terrorist attacks that took place in Paris on 13 November 2015, Stade Français announced to postpone this match as they did "not wish to overburden or complicate the work of the government and security forces by organising a sporting event".)	(Ireland) Munster

Stade Jean-Bouin
Referee: Wayne Barnes (RFU)

12 December 2015
16:15

Benetton Treviso (Italy)	17–50	(France) Stade Français (1 BP)
Try: Christie 58' m Ragusi 71' c Lazzaroni 78' m Con: Hayward (1/3) 71'	Report	Try: Nayacalevu 4' c Arias 8' c Williams (2) 11' m, 53' c Nicolas 22' c Bosman 27 c Parisse 46' c Con: Plisson (6/7) 5', 8', 23', 27', 47', 54'; Pen: Plisson (1/1) 2'

Stadio Comunale di Monigo
Attendance: 4,600
Referee: Matthew Carley (RFU)

12 December 2015
19:45

Munster (Ireland)	19–31	(England) Leicester Tigers
Try: Cronin 41' m Sherry 66' m Con: Keatley (0/2); Pen: Keatley (3/4) 13', 18', 45'	Report	Try: Goneva 33' m Fitzgerald 37' c B. Youngs 53' c Con: O. Williams (2/3) 39', 54'; Pen: O. Williams (2/2) 1', 28'; Bell (2/2) 69', 75'

Thomond Park
Attendance: 22,261
Referee: Romain Poite (FFR)

19 December 2015
16:15

(1 BP) Stade Français (France)	40–14	(Italy) Benetton Treviso
Try: Penalty try 8' c Bonneval 12' c Raisuqe (2) 20' c, 49' c Zhvania 61' c Doumayrou 78' m Con: Steyn (5/6) 8', 12', 21', 50', 63'	Report	Try: Sgarbi 56' c Giazzon 73' c Con: Hayward (1/1) 58'; Ambrosini (1/1) 74'

Stade Jean-Bouin
Attendance: 9,785
Referee: Greg Garner (RFU)

20 December 2015
17:15

Leicester Tigers (England)	17–6	(Ireland) Munster
Try: Slater 23' c Goneva 65' c Con: Burns (2/2) 24', 66'; Pen: Burns (1/2) 35'	Report	Pen: Keatley (2/4) 6', 40'

Welford Road
Attendance: 21,645
Referee: Jérôme Garcès (FFR)

9 January 2016
17:45

Stade Français (France)	27–7	(Ireland) Munster
Try: Williams 32' c Macalou 66' c Bonneval 70' c Con: Steyn (3/3) 33', 67', 72'; Pen: Steyn (2/3) 36', 54'	Report	Try: Murray 74' c Con: R. Scannell (1/1) 75'

Stade Jean-Bouin
Attendance: 13,820
Referee: Nigel Owens (WRU)

16 January 2016
13:00

(1 BP) Munster (Ireland)	26–13	(France) Stade Français
Try: Sherry 18' m Earls 39' c Zebo 41' c Stander 67' c Con: Keatley (3/4) 40', 42', 68'	Report	Try: Ross 62' c Con: Steyn (1/1) 63'; Pen: Steyn (2/3) 1', 36'

Thomond Park
Attendance: 18,884
Referee: JP Doyle (RFU)

16 January 2016
17:30

(1 BP) Leicester Tigers (England)	47–7	(Italy) Benetton Treviso
Try: Fitzgerald 1' c Penalty try 19' c Goneva 28' c Thompstone 35' c B. Youngs 43' m Burns 52' c Pearce 75' c Con: Burns (6/7) 2', 20', 29', 37', 53', 76'	Report	Try: Pratichetti 32' c Con: Ambrosini (1/1) 33'

Welford Road
Attendance: 19,076
Referee: Ben Whitehouse (WRU)

24 January 2016
14:00

Benetton Treviso (Italy)	5–28	(Ireland) Munster (1 BP)
Try: Lazzaroni 36' m	Report	Try: R. O'Mahony (2) 4' c, 65' c Kilcoyne 16' c Murray 49' c Con: Keatley (4/4) 4', 16', 49', 66'

Stadio Comunale di Monigo
Attendance: 3,200
Referee: Alexandre Ruiz (FFR)

24 January 2016
14:00

(1 BP) Stade Français (France)	36–21	(England) Leicester Tigers
Try: Plisson 23' c Nayacalevu 29' m Slimani 33' c Lakafia 53' c Doumayrou 79' c Con: Plisson (3/4) 24', 35', 54', 80'; Pen: Plisson (1/2) 68'	Report	Try: Tuilagi 19' c Barrow 58' c Thacker 76' c Con: Burns (1/1) 20'; Bell (2/2) 59', 77'

Stade Jean-Bouin
Attendance: 12,073
Referee: George Clancy (IRFU)

=== Pool 5 ===
Team	P	W	D	L	PF	PA	Diff	TF	TA	TB	LB	Pts
(England) Wasps (4)	6	4	0	2	186	72	+114	19	8	2	2	20
(France) Toulon (6)	6	5	0	1	96	91	+5	9	7	0	0	20
(England) Bath	6	2	0	4	88	131	–43	7	8	0	2	10
(Ireland) Leinster	6	1	0	5	82	158	–76	5	17	0	2	6

15 November 2015
13:00

Leinster (Ireland)	6–33	(England) Wasps
Pen: Sexton (2/3) 9', 17'	Report	Try: Wade 29' c Simpson 47' c Piutau 79' c Con: Jackson (2/2) 30', 48'; Lozowski (1/1) 80'; Pen: Jackson (3/3) 3', 19', 69'; Daly (1/3) 25'

RDS Arena
Attendance: 16,791
Referee: Mathieu Raynal (FFR)

15 November 2015
16:15

Toulon (France)	P–P	(England) Bath

Stade Mayol
Referee: Nigel Owens (WRU)

21 November 2015
15:15

Bath (England)	19–16	(Ireland) Leinster (1 BP)
Try: Penalty try 61' c Con: Ford (1/1) 62'; Pen: Ford (3/3) 15', 45', 76'; Drop: Ford (1/1) 20'	Report	Try: Van der Flier 69' c Con: Sexton (1/1) 69'; Pen: Sexton (3/4) 8', 48', 55'

Recreation Ground
Attendance: 13,480
Referee: Jérôme Garcès (FFR)

22 November 2015
17:15

(1 BP) Wasps (England)	32–6	(France) Toulon
Try: Hughes (2) 9' c, 66' m Jackson 11' c Halai 51' c Con: Jackson (3/4) 9', 11', 51'; Pen: Daly (1/1) 23'; Jackson (1/1) 30'	Report	Pen: Pélissié (2/2) 17', 35'

Ricoh Arena
Attendance: 20,050
Referee: John Lacey (IRFU)

13 December 2015
16:15

Toulon (France)	24–9	(Ireland) Leinster
Try: S. Armitage (2) 10' c, 79' m Con: Escande (1/1) 11'; Pen: Escande (4/4) 20', 49', 53', 66'	Report	Pen: Sexton (3/4) 3', 5', 23'

Stade Mayol
Attendance: 12,590
Referee: Nigel Owens (WRU)

13 December 2015
17:15

(1 BP) Wasps (England)	23–25	(England) Bath
Try: Miller 58' m Pen: Jackson (4/5) 5', 34', 40', 50'; Daly (1/3) 17'; Gopperth (1/1) 74'	Report	Try: Joseph 13' c Banahan 21' m Watson 80+4' c Con: Ford (2/3) 13', 80+6'; Pen: Ford (2/3) 11', 48'

Ricoh Arena
Attendance: 11,319
Referee: Jérôme Garcès (FFR)

19 December 2015
15:15

Bath (England)	10–36	(England) Wasps
Try: Rokoduguni 9' c Con: Ford (1/1) 10'; Pen: Ford (1/1) 57'	Report	Try: Daly 14' c Gopperth 40' c Leiua 73' c Con: Gopperth (3/3) 15', 40', 74'; Pen: Gopperth (4/4) 13', 19', 25', 64'; Drop: Daly (1/1) 69'

Recreation Ground
Attendance: 12,961
Referee: Romain Poite (FFR)

19 December 2015
17:15

(1 BP) Leinster (Ireland)	16–20	(France) Toulon
Try: Penalty try 17' c Con: Sexton (1/1) 18'; Pen: Sexton (3/3) 10', 34', 39'	Report	Try: Smith 27' m Penalty try 57' m Etrillard 64' m Con: Escande (1/1) 28'; Taylor (1/2) 58'; Pen: Taylor (1/1) 73'

Aviva Stadium
Attendance: 44,925
Referee: Wayne Barnes (RFU)

10 January 2016
16:15

Toulon (France)	12–9	(England) Bath (1 BP)
Pen: Escande (3/4) 15', 34', 45'; Michalak (1/1) 75'	Report	Pen: Ford (1/1) 2'; Drop: Ford (2/3) 27', 41'

Stade Mayol
Attendance: 12,772
Referee: George Clancy (IRFU)

16 January 2016
17:30

Leinster (Ireland)	25–11	(England) Bath
Try: Cronin 62' c Con: Madigan (1/1) 63'; Pen: Madigan (6/7) 8', 33', 35', 40', 46', 76'	Report	Try: Houston 59' m Pen: Ford (1/1) 29'; Priestland (1/1) 67'

RDS Arena
Attendance: 14,569
Referee: Pascal Gaüzère (FFR)

17 January 2016
16:15

Toulon (France)	15–11	(England) Wasps (1 BP)
Try: Cooper 12' m Mitchell 80' c Con: Michalak (1/1) 80'; Pen: Escande (1/1) 23'	Report	Try: Thompson 70'm Pen: Gopperth (2/2) 25', 62'

Stade Mayol
Attendance: 13,344
Referee: Nigel Owens (WRU)

23 January 2016
15:15

(1 BP) Bath (England)	14–19	(France) Toulon
Try: Watson 45' m Con: Ford (0/1); Pen: Ford (3/5) 16', 26', 50'	Report	Try: S. Armitage 18' m Habana 57' m Pen: O'Connor (3/4) 4', 11', 75'

Recreation Ground
Attendance: 13,285
Referee: John Lacey (IRFU)

23 January 2016
15:15

(1 BP) Wasps (England)	51–10	(Ireland) Leinster
Try: Gopperth 11' c Launchbury 16' m Daly 45' c Penalty try 53' c Halai 60' c Piutau 70' c Johnson 78' m Con: Gopperth (4/5) 12', 46', 54', 62'; Jackson (1/2) 71'; Pen: Gopperth (2/2) 38', 42'	Report	Try: Kirchner 2' m Reddan 30' m

Ricoh Arena
Attendance: 16,519
Referee: Mathieu Raynal (FFR)
