= 2014 France rugby union tour of Australia =

- Coach: Philippe Saint-André
- Tour captain: Thierry Dusautoir
- Top test point scorer: Frédéric Michalak (13)
- Top test try scorer(s): Guilhem Guirado (1); Morgan Parra (1)
Summary
P	W	D	L
Total
3	0	0	3
Test match
3	0	0	3
Opponent
P	W	D	L
Australia
3	0	0	3

Tour chronology
- ← New Zealand 2013 Argentina 2016 →

In June 2014, France played a three-test series against Australia as part of the 2014 mid-year rugby union tests. They played the Wallabies across the three week June International window (2–22 June), and which were part of the third year of the global rugby calendar established by the International Rugby Board, which runs through to 2019. This was France's first tour to Australia since 2009 and first series since 2008.

== Fixtures ==
Date	Venue	Home	Score	Away
7 June 2014	Lang Park, Brisbane	Australia	50–23	France
14 June 2014	Docklands Stadium, Melbourne	Australia	6–0	France
21 June 2014	Sydney Football Stadium, Sydney	Australia	39–13	France

== Squads ==
Note: Ages, caps and clubs are as per 7 June, the first test match of the tour.

=== France ===
On 7 May 2014, coach Philippe Saint-André named a 31-man squad for the three test tour of Australia in June.

On 19 May 2014, Benjamin Kayser was withdrawn from the squad due to injury, and was replaced by Brice Mach.

Coaching team:

- Head coach: (France) Guy Novès
- Forwards coach: (France) Yannick Bru
- Backs coach: (France) Jean-Frederic Dubois

Note: Flags indicate national union for the club/province as defined by World Rugby.

Player	Position	Date of birth (age)	Caps	Club/province
Guilhem Guirado	Hooker	17 June 1986 (aged 27)	20	(France) Perpignan
Benjamin Kayser	Hooker	26 July 1984 (aged 29)	24	(France) Clermont
Brice Mach	Hooker	2 April 1986 (aged 28)	2	(France) Castres
Christopher Tolofua	Hooker	31 December 1993 (aged 20)	2	(France) Toulouse
Vincent Debaty	Prop	2 October 1981 (aged 32)	23	(France) Clermont
Thomas Domingo	Prop	20 August 1985 (aged 28)	33	(France) Clermont
Nicolas Mas	Prop	23 May 1980 (aged 34)	71	(France) Montpellier
Alexandre Menini	Prop	5 August 1983 (aged 30)	0	(France) Toulon
Rabah Slimani	Prop	18 October 1989 (aged 24)	7	(France) Stade Français
Alexandre Flanquart	Lock	9 October 1989 (aged 24)	5	(France) Stade Français
Yoann Maestri	Lock	14 January 1988 (aged 26)	25	(France) Toulouse
Sébastien Vahaamahina	Lock	21 October 1991 (aged 22)	13	(France) Perpignan
Antoine Burban	Flanker	22 July 1987 (aged 26)	1	(France) Stade Français
Thierry Dusautoir (c)	Flanker	18 November 1981 (aged 32)	65	(France) Toulouse
Bernard Le Roux	Flanker	4 June 1989 (aged 25)	5	(France) Racing Métro
Yannick Nyanga	Flanker	19 December 1983 (aged 30)	37	(France) Toulouse
Fulgence Ouedraogo	Flanker	21 July 1986 (aged 27)	34	(France) Montpellier
Damien Chouly	Number 8	27 November 1985 (aged 28)	18	(France) Clermont
Louis Picamoles	Number 8	5 February 1986 (aged 28)	42	(France) Toulouse
Maxime Machenaud	Scrum-half	30 December 1988 (aged 25)	16	(France) Racing Métro
Morgan Parra	Scrum-half	15 November 1988 (aged 25)	54	(France) Clermont
Frédéric Michalak	Fly-half	16 October 1982 (aged 31)	68	(France) Toulon
Rémi Talès	Fly-half	2 May 1984 (aged 30)	8	(France) Castres
Mathieu Bastareaud	Centre	17 September 1988 (aged 25)	23	(France) Toulon
Gaël Fickou	Centre	26 March 1994 (aged 20)	8	(France) Toulouse
Wesley Fofana	Centre	20 January 1988 (aged 26)	24	(France) Clermont
Rémi Lamerat	Centre	14 January 1990 (aged 24)	0	(France) Castres
Yoann Huget	Wing	2 June 1987 (aged 27)	27	(France) Toulouse
Felix Le Bourhis	Wing	7 April 1988 (aged 26)	0	(France) Bordeaux
Maxime Médard	Wing	16 November 1986 (aged 27)	39	(France) Toulouse
Hugo Bonneval	Fullback	19 November 1990 (aged 23)	2	(France) Stade Français
Brice Dulin	Fullback	13 April 1990 (aged 24)	15	(France) Castres

=== Australia ===
The 32-man squad for the 3-test series against France, in Brisbane (7 June), Melbourne (14 June) and Sydney (21 June).

Wingers Henry Speight (Brumbies) and Tom English (Rebels), prop Paddy Ryan (Waratahs) and Lock Cadeyrn Neville (Rebels) have also been invited to train with the squad ahead of the test series.

On 1 June, Ben Alexander with withdrawn from the squad due to injury. Paddy Ryan was promoted to the main squad as Alexander's replacement, while Laurie Weeks was added into the training squad to replace Ryan.

On 9 June, James Hanson was added to the squad to replace the injured Stephen Moore who sustained a knee injury in the first test.

Coaching team:

- Head coach: (Australia) Ewen McKenzie
- Forwards coach: (Australia) Andrew Blades
- Backs coach: (Australia) Jim McKay
- Defence coach: (Australia) Nick Scrivener

Note: Flags indicate national union for the club/province as defined by World Rugby.

Player	Position	Date of birth (age)	Caps	Club/province
Nathan Charles	Hooker	9 January 1989 (aged 25)	0	Force
James Hanson	Hooker	15 September 1988 (aged 25)	1	Reds
Stephen Moore (c)	Hooker	20 January 1983 (aged 31)	91	Brumbies
Tatafu Polota-Nau	Hooker	26 July 1985 (aged 28)	46	Waratahs
Ben Alexander	Prop	13 November 1984 (aged 29)	62	Brumbies
Pekahou Cowan	Prop	2 June 1986 (aged 28)	5	Force
Sekope Kepu	Prop	5 February 1986 (aged 28)	38	Waratahs
Paddy Ryan	Prop	9 August 1988 (aged 25)	2	Waratahs
Scott Sio	Prop	16 October 1991 (aged 22)	4	Brumbies
James Slipper	Prop	6 June 1989 (aged 25)	49	Reds
Sam Carter	Lock	10 September 1989 (aged 24)	0	Brumbies
James Horwill	Lock	29 May 1985 (aged 29)	48	Reds
Luke Jones	Lock	2 April 1991 (aged 23)	0	Rebels
Rob Simmons	Lock	19 April 1989 (aged 25)	37	Reds
Will Skelton	Lock	3 May 1992 (aged 22)	0	Waratahs
Scott Fardy	Flanker	5 July 1984 (aged 29)	10	Brumbies
Matt Hodgson	Flanker	25 June 1981 (aged 32)	6	Force
Michael Hooper (vc)	Flanker	29 October 1991 (aged 22)	28	Waratahs
Scott Higginbotham	Number 8	5 September 1986 (aged 27)	23	Rebels
Ben McCalman	Number 8	18 March 1988 (aged 26)	29	Force
Wycliff Palu	Number 8	27 July 1982 (aged 31)	49	Waratahs
Will Genia	Scrum-half	17 January 1988 (aged 26)	55	Reds
Nick Phipps	Scrum-half	9 January 1989 (aged 25)	14	Waratahs
Nic White	Scrum-half	13 June 1990 (aged 23)	10	Brumbies
Bernard Foley	Fly-half	8 September 1989 (aged 24)	4	Waratahs
Kurtley Beale	Fly-half	6 January 1989 (aged 25)	39	Waratahs
Tevita Kuridrani	Centre	31 March 1991 (aged 23)	8	Brumbies
Christian Lealiifano	Centre	24 September 1987 (aged 26)	13	Brumbies
Pat McCabe	Centre	21 March 1988 (aged 26)	20	Brumbies
Matt To'omua	Centre	2 January 1990 (aged 24)	10	Brumbies
Adam Ashley-Cooper (vc)	Wing	27 March 1984 (aged 30)	91	Waratahs
Nick Cummins	Wing	5 October 1987 (aged 26)	12	Force
Rob Horne	Wing	4 September 1989 (aged 24)	15	Waratahs
Israel Folau	Fullback	3 April 1989 (aged 25)	15	Waratahs

== Matches ==
=== First test ===
7 June 2014
20:00 AEST (UTC+10)

Australia	50–23	France
Try: Folau 18' c Ashley-Cooper 23' m Hooper 32' c To'omua 38' c Cummins 55' c Beale 67' c McCabe 70' c Con: Foley (6/7) 20', 32', 39', 57', 68', 71'; Pen: Foley (1/2) 3'	Report	Try: Parra 72' c Penalty try 80' c Con: Michalak (2/2) 73', 80'; Pen: Michalak (2/2) 26', 36'; Drop: Michalak (1/1) 4'

Suncorp Stadium, Brisbane
Attendance: 33,718
Referee: Craig Joubert (South Africa)

FB	15	Israel Folau
RW	14	Adam Ashley-Cooper
OC	13	Tevita Kuridrani	(substituted off) 70'
IC	12	Matt To'omua	(substituted off) 62'
LW	11	Nick Cummins
FH	10	Bernard Foley
SH	9	Nic White	(substituted off) 62'
N8	8	Wycliff Palu	(substituted off) 54'
OF	7	Michael Hooper
BF	6	Scott Fardy
RL	5	Rob Simmons	(substituted off) 70'
LL	4	Sam Carter
TP	3	Sekope Kepu	(substituted off) 53'
HK	2	Stephen Moore (c)	(substituted off) 5'
LP	1	James Slipper	(substituted off) 62'
Replacements:
HK	16	Tatafu Polota-Nau	(substituted on) 5'
PR	17	Pekahou Cowan	(substituted on) 62'
PR	18	Paddy Ryan	(substituted on) 53'
LK	19	James Horwill	(substituted on) 70'
N8	20	Ben McCalman	(substituted on) 54'
SH	21	Nick Phipps	(substituted on) 62'
FH	22	Kurtley Beale	(substituted on) 62'
CE	23	Pat McCabe	(substituted on) 70'
Coach:
(Australia) Ewen McKenzie

FB	15	Hugo Bonneval
RW	14	Yoann Huget
OC	13	Gaël Fickou	(substituted off) 73'
IC	12	Wesley Fofana
LW	11	Felix Le Bourhis	(substituted off) 53'
FH	10	Frédéric Michalak
SH	9	Maxime Machenaud	(substituted off) 69'
N8	8	Damien Chouly
OF	7	Bernard Le Roux	(substituted off) 61'
BF	6	Fulgence Ouedraogo
RL	5	Yoann Maestri
LL	4	Sébastien Vahaamahina	(substituted off) 53'
TP	3	Nicolas Mas (c)	(substituted off) 53'
HK	2	Guilhem Guirado	(substituted off) 69'
LP	1	Thomas Domingo	(substituted off) 53'
Replacements:
HK	16	Christopher Tolofua	(substituted on) 69'
PR	17	Vincent Debaty	(substituted on) 53'
PR	18	Rabah Slimani	(substituted on) 53'
LK	19	Alexandre Flanquart	(substituted on) 53'
FL	20	Antoine Burban	(substituted on) 61'
SH	21	Morgan Parra	(substituted on) 69'
CE	22	Rémi Lamerat	(substituted on) 73'
FB	23	Brice Dulin	(substituted on) 53'
Coach:
(France) Philippe Saint-André

Man of the Match:
Sam Carter (Australia)

Touch judges:
Chris Pollock (New Zealand)
Garratt Williamson (New Zealand)
Television match official:
Ben Skeen (New Zealand)

Notes:

- James Slipper and Wycliff Palu earned their 50th test cap for Australia.
- Sam Carter made his international debut for Australia.
- Felix Le Bourhis and Rémi Lamerat made their international debuts for France.

=== Second test ===
14 June 2014
20:00 AEST (UTC+10)

Australia	6–0	France
Pen: White (1/4) 64'; Foley (1/1) 52'	Report

Etihad Stadium, Melbourne
Attendance: 27,189
Referee: Wayne Barnes (England)

FB	15	Israel Folau
RW	14	Adam Ashley-Cooper
OC	13	Tevita Kuridrani	(substituted off) 59'
IC	12	Matt To'omua
LW	11	Nick Cummins
FH	10	Bernard Foley	(substituted off) 60'
SH	9	Nic White	(substituted off) 78'
N8	8	Ben McCalman
OF	7	Michael Hooper (c)
BF	6	Scott Fardy	(substituted off) 66'
RL	5	James Horwill	(substituted off) 59'
LL	4	Rob Simmons
TP	3	Sekope Kepu	(substituted off) 74'
HK	2	Tatafu Polota-Nau	(substituted off) 74'
LP	1	James Slipper	(substituted off) 71'
Replacements:
HK	16	Nathan Charles	(substituted on) 74'
PR	17	Pekahou Cowan	(substituted on) 71'
PR	18	Laurie Weeks	(substituted on) 74'
LK	19	Luke Jones	(substituted on) 59'
N8	20	Scott Higginbotham	(substituted on) 66'
SH	21	Nick Phipps	(substituted on) 78'
FH	22	Kurtley Beale	(substituted on) 60'
CE	23	Pat McCabe	(substituted on) 59'
Coach:
(Australia) Ewen McKenzie

FB	15	Brice Dulin
RW	14	Yoann Huget
OC	13	Mathieu Bastareaud
IC	12	Wesley Fofana
LW	11	Maxime Médard		(substituted off) 76'
FH	10	Rémi Talès
SH	9	Morgan Parra		(substituted off) 74'
N8	8	Damien Chouly
OF	7	Yannick Nyanga		(substituted off) 46'
BF	6	Thierry Dusautoir (c)		(substituted off) 66'
RL	5	Yoann Maestri
LL	4	Alexandre Flanquart		(substituted off) 65'
TP	3	Rabah Slimani		(substituted off) 49'
HK	2	Guilhem Guirado		(substituted off) 70'
LP	1	Alexandre Menini		(substituted off) 49'
Replacements:
HK	16	Brice Mach		(substituted on) 70'
PR	17	Thomas Domingo		(substituted on) 49'
PR	18	Nicolas Mas		(substituted on) 49'
FL	19	Bernard Le Roux	(yellow card) 68' to 78'	(substituted on) 65'
N8	20	Louis Picamoles		(substituted on) 66'
FL	21	Antoine Burban		(substituted on) 46'
FH	22	Frédéric Michalak		(substituted on) 74'
CE	23	Rémi Lamerat		(substituted on) 76'
Coach:
(France) Philippe Saint-André

Man of the Match:
Nic White (Australia)

Touch judges:
Craig Joubert (South Africa)
Chris Pollock (New Zealand)
Television match official:
Ben Skeen (New Zealand)

Notes:

- James Horwill earned his 50th test cap for Australia.
- Nathan Charles, Luke Jones and Laurie Weeks made their international debuts for Australia.
- Alexandre Menini made his international debut for France.
- Australia reclaim the Trophée des Bicentenaires for the first time since 2010, after losing it in 2012.
- This was the first time France has failed to score any points against Australia, in the 44 meetings between the two teams.
- Fewest points in an Australian win since their 6–3 win over New Zealand in 1958, and first Australian win without a try since their 21–13 win over Wales in 2001.

=== Third test ===
21 June 2014
15:00 AEST (UTC+10)

Australia	39–13	France
Try: Skelton 7' c Folau (2) 26' c, 41' c Hooper 60' c Phipps 73' m Con: Foley (4/5) 9', 27', 42', 61'; Pen: Foley (2/2) 2', 17'	Report	Try: Guirado 65' c Con: Machenaud (1/1) 65'; Pen: Machenaud (1/2) 34'; Dulin (1/1) 15'

Allianz Stadium, Sydney
Attendance: 43,188
Referee: Chris Pollock (New Zealand)

FB	15	Israel Folau
RW	14	Adam Ashley-Cooper
OC	13	Tevita Kuridrani	(substituted off) 70'
IC	12	Matt To'omua	(substituted off) 54'
LW	11	Nick Cummins
FH	10	Bernard Foley
SH	9	Nic White	(substituted off) 58'
N8	8	Wycliff Palu	(substituted off) 63'
OF	7	Michael Hooper (c)
BF	6	Scott Fardy
RL	5	Rob Simmons
LL	4	Will Skelton	(substituted off) 56'
TP	3	Sekope Kepu	(substituted off) 58'
HK	2	Tatafu Polota-Nau	(substituted off) 68'
LP	1	James Slipper	(substituted off) 52'
Replacements:
HK	16	Nathan Charles	(substituted on) 68'
PR	17	Scott Sio	(substituted on) 52'
PR	18	Laurie Weeks	(substituted on) 58'
LK	19	James Horwill	(substituted on) 56'
N8	20	Ben McCalman	(substituted on) 63'
SH	21	Nick Phipps	(substituted on) 58'
FH	22	Kurtley Beale	(substituted on) 54'
WG	23	Rob Horne	(substituted on) 70'
Coach:
(Australia) Ewen McKenzie

FB	15	Brice Dulin
RW	14	Yoann Huget
OC	13	Mathieu Bastareaud
IC	12	Wesley Fofana
LW	11	Hugo Bonneval		(substituted off) 43'
FH	10	Rémi Talès		(substituted off) 70'
SH	9	Maxime Machenaud
N8	8	Damien Chouly		(substituted off) 58'
OF	7	Fulgence Ouedraogo		(substituted off) 50'
BF	6	Thierry Dusautoir (c)
RL	5	Yoann Maestri
LL	4	Alexandre Flanquart		(substituted off) 59'
TP	3	Rabah Slimani	(yellow card) 26' to 36'	(substituted off) 47'
HK	2	Guilhem Guirado		(substituted off) 68'
LP	1	Alexandre Menini		(substituted off) 47'
Replacements:
HK	16	Christopher Tolofua		(substituted on) 68'
PR	17	Vincent Debaty		(substituted on) 47'
PR	18	Thomas Domingo		(substituted on) 47'
FL	19	Bernard Le Roux		(substituted on) 59'
N8	20	Louis Picamoles		(substituted on) 58'
FL	21	Yannick Nyanga		(substituted on) 50'
FH	22	Frédéric Michalak		(substituted on) 70'
CE	23	Rémi Lamerat		(substituted on) 43'
Coach:
(France) Phillipe Saint-Andre

Man of the Match:
Wycliff Palu (Australia)

Touch judges:
Wayne Barnes (England)
George Clancy (Ireland)
Television match official:
Ben Skeen (New Zealand)

Notes:

- Will Skelton made his international debut for Australia.
- The 43,188-person crowd was a record crowd for an Australian test at Allianz Stadium.

== Statistics ==
Key

- Con: Conversions
- Pen: Penalties
- DG: Drop goals
- Pts: Points

=== France statistics ===
Name	Played	Tries	Con	Pen	DG	Pts	Temporarily suspended	Sent off (straight red)
Frédéric Michalak	3	0	2	2	1	13	–	–
Guilhem Guirado	3	1	0	0	0	5	–	–
Maxime Machenaud	2	0	1	1	0	5	–	–
Morgan Parra	2	1	0	0	0	5	–	–
Brice Dulin	3	0	0	0	1	3	–	–
Damien Chouly	3	0	0	0	0	0	–	–
Thomas Domingo	3	0	0	0	0	0	–	–
Alexandre Flanquart	3	0	0	0	0	0	–	–
Wesley Fofana	3	0	0	0	0	0	–	–
Yoann Huget	3	0	0	0	0	0	–	–
Rémi Lamerat	3	0	0	0	0	0	–	–
Bernard Le Roux	3	0	0	0	0	0	1	–
Yoann Maestri	3	0	0	0	0	0	–	–
Rabah Slimani	3	0	0	0	0	0	1	–
Mathieu Bastareaud	2	0	0	0	0	0	–	–
Hugo Bonneval	2	0	0	0	0	0	–	–
Antoine Burban	2	0	0	0	0	0	–	–
Vincent Debaty	2	0	0	0	0	0	–	–
Thierry Dusautoir	2	0	0	0	0	0	–	–
Nicolas Mas	2	0	0	0	0	0	–	–
Alexandre Menini	2	0	0	0	0	0	–	–
Yannick Nyanga	2	0	0	0	0	0	–	–
Fulgence Ouedraogo	2	0	0	0	0	0	–	–
Louis Picamoles	2	0	0	0	0	0	–	–
Rémi Talès	2	0	0	0	0	0	–	–
Christopher Tolofua	2	0	0	0	0	0	–	–
Gaël Fickou	1	0	0	0	0	0	–	–
Felix Le Bourhis	1	0	0	0	0	0	–	–
Brice Mach	1	0	0	0	0	0	–	–
Maxime Médard	1	0	0	0	0	0	–	–
Sébastien Vahaamahina	1	0	0	0	0	0	–	–
Benjamin Kayser	–	–	–	–	–	0	–	–

=== Test series statistics ===
Name	Team	Tries	Con	Pen	DG	Pts
Bernard Foley	Australia	0	10	4	0	32
Israel Folau	Australia	3	0	0	0	15
Frédéric Michalak	France	0	2	2	1	13
Michael Hooper	Australia	2	0	0	0	10
Adam Ashley-Cooper	Australia	1	0	0	0	5
Kurtley Beale	Australia	1	0	0	0	5
Nick Cummins	Australia	1	0	0	0	5
Guilhem Guirado	France	1	0	0	0	5
Maxime Machenaud	France	0	1	1	0	5
Pat McCabe	Australia	1	0	0	0	5
Morgan Parra	France	1	0	0	0	5
Nick Phipps	Australia	1	0	0	0	5
Will Skelton	Australia	1	0	0	0	5
Matt To'omua	Australia	1	0	0	0	5
Brice Dulin	France	0	0	0	1	3
Nic White	Australia	0	0	1	0	3
