= Chiocci =

Chiocci is an Italian surname. Notable people with the surname include:

- Steph Chiocci (born 1988), Australian rules footballer
- Xavier Chiocci (born 1990), French rugby union player
