= Karena Wihongi =

New Zealand rugby union player

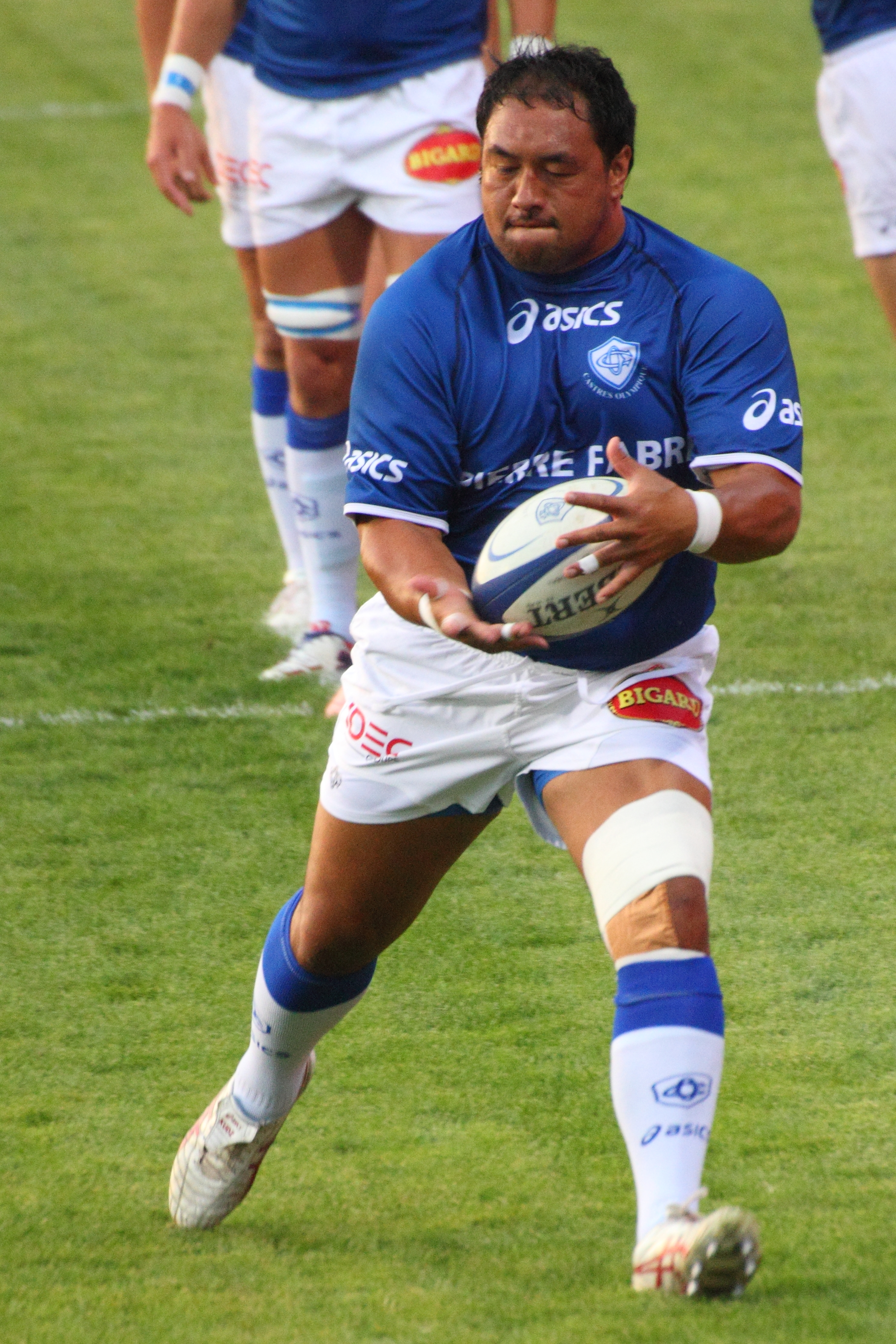
- Born: 29 September 1979 (age 47) New Zealand
- Height: 1.86 m (6 ft 1 in)
- Weight: 130 kg (20 st 7 lb)

Rugby union career
- Position: Prop
- Current team: Castres Olympique
Senior career
Years	Team	Apps	(Points)
2000–2005	CS Lons Jura		
2005–2007	Oyonnax	32	(0)
2007–2010	Bourgoin	77	(20)
2010–2011	Sale Sharks	15	(0)
2011–16	Castres	104	(15)
2016–17	Lyon OU	0	(0)
2018–19	US Carcassonne	20	(20)
2019–	Castres Olympique	7	(0)
- Correct as of 6 December 2019

Karena Wihongi (born 29 September 1979, in New Zealand) is a New Zealand rugby union footballer. He plays as a prop, and has "a reputation for powerful scrummaging courtesy of his hefty 19st 9lb, 6ft 1in frame." He previously played his club rugby for the Aviva Premiership side Sale Sharks, to whom he was signed in 2010. He came from former French clubs Oyonnax Rugby and CS Bourgoin Jallieu; he is a French qualified player based on residency. The Sale Sharks' coach stated that "He was on my priority list as soon as I was appointed and was delighted when he signed on the dotted line." He currently plays for Castres Olympique in the Top 14.

== Honours ==
=== Club ===
(France) Castres

- Top 14: 2012–13
