= Gagi, India =

Gagi
- village
- Interactive map of Gagi
- Coordinates: 23.461°N 85.281°E
- Country: India
- State: Jharkhand
- District: Ranchi

Population (2011)
  - Total: 3,026

Languages
  - Official: Hindi, Nagpuri
- Time zone: UTC+5:30 (IST)
- Vehicle registration: JH

Gagi is a small village in Kanke blocks of Ranchi, India. It has a population of 3,026.
