= Antoine Burban =

French rugby union footballer

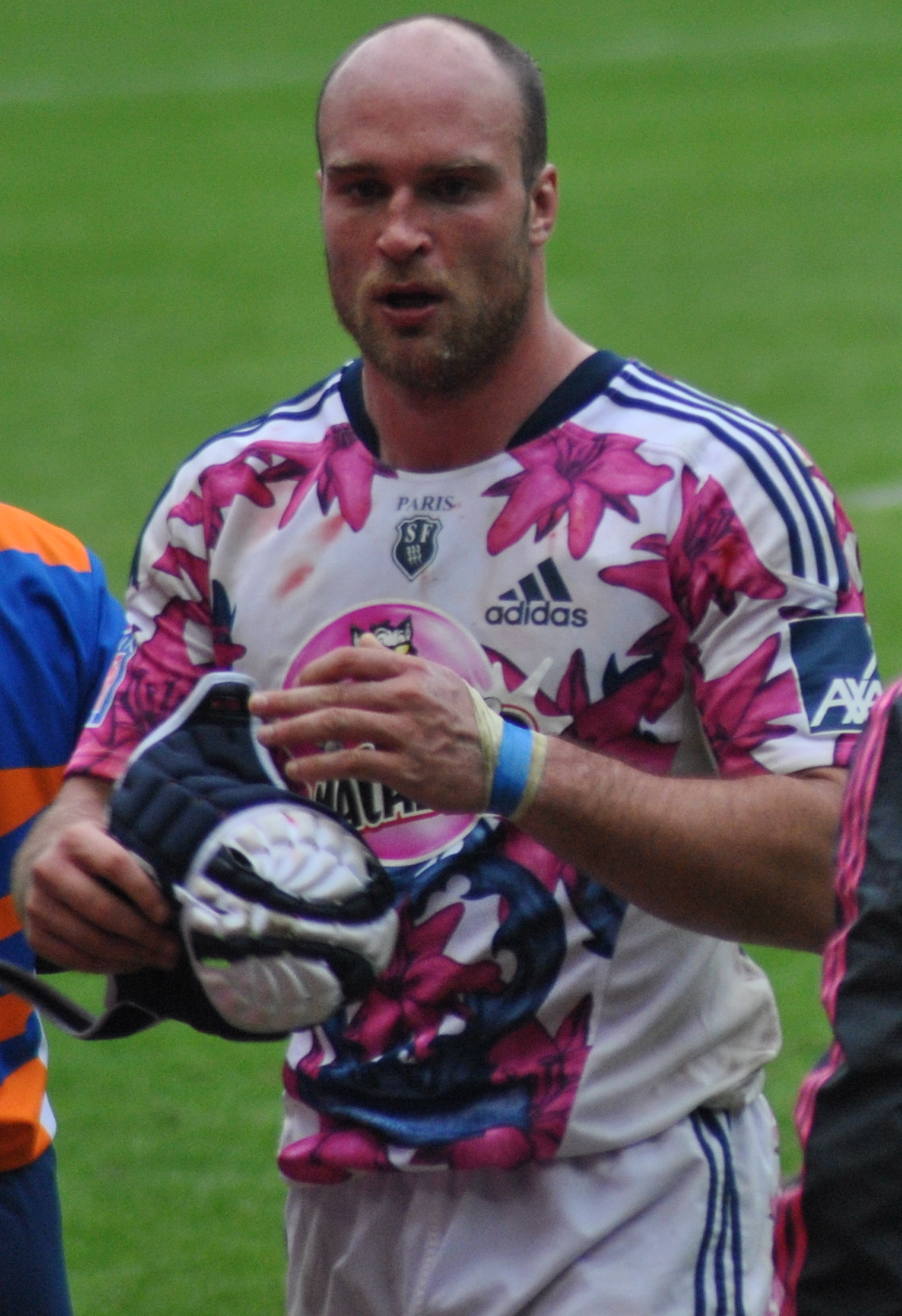
- Born: 22 July 1987 (age 39) Neuilly-sur-Seine, France
- Height: 1.89 m (6 ft 2 in)
- Weight: 110 kg (243 lb)

Rugby union career
- Position: Flanker
Senior career
Years	Team	Apps	(Points)
2006–	Stade Français	173	(70)
- Correct as of 9 January 2015
International career
Years	Team	Apps	(Points)
2013-	France	4	(0)
- Correct as of 26 February 2016

Antoine Burban (born 22 July 1987) is a French rugby union footballer.

He currently plays for Stade Français in the Top 14. His usual position is at Flanker. He made his debut in 2006 and became one of the principal Flankers, he took the place of Rémy Martin. Burban was called up by the France national rugby union team in 2009 but was injured and did not play

== Awards ==
- Top 14 (2007)
