= Xavier Chiocci =

France international rugby union player

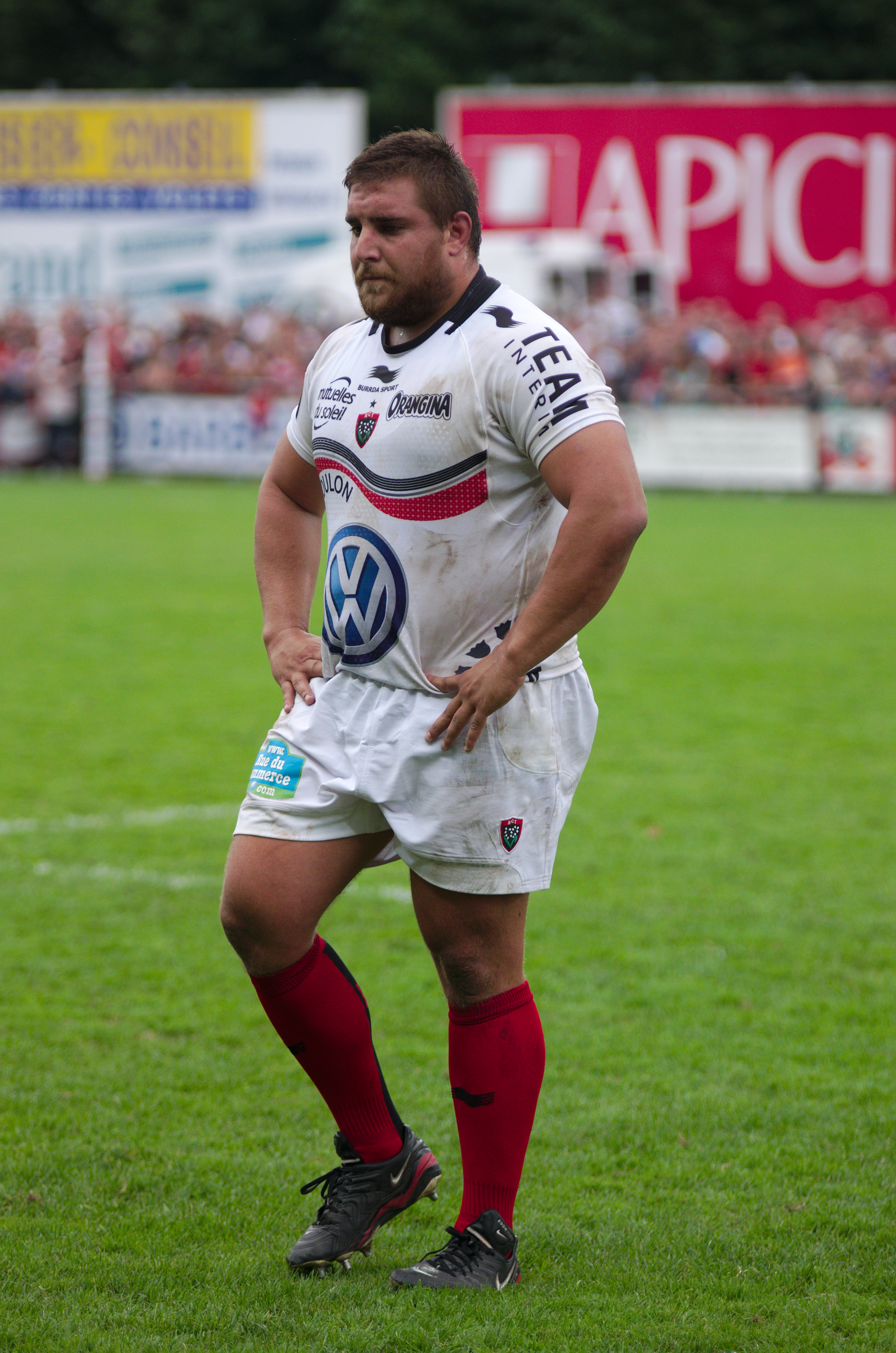
- Xavier Chiocci Portrait
- Born: Xavier Chiocci; 13 February 1990 (age 36) Toulon, France
- Height: 1.80 m (5 ft 11 in)
- Weight: 123 kg (19 st 5 lb; 271 lb)

Rugby union career
- Position: Prop
- Current team: Toulon
Amateur team(s)
Years	Team	Apps	(Points)
- RC La Valette
Senior career
Years	Team	Apps	(Points)
2011-19	Toulon	177	(55)
2019-2022	Lyon OU	52	(10)
- Correct as of 12 December 2019
International career
Years	Team	Apps	(Points)
2010	France U20	7	(5)
2014-	France	10	(0)
- Correct as of 27 June 2017

Xavier Chiocci, (Italian pronunciation: [ˈkjɔttʃi]) born 13 February 1990 in Toulon, France, is a French rugby union player who represents Toulon in the Top 14.

== Biography ==
He first began his playing career in 2000 when playing for RC La Valette, and did so until 2007. During that time he represented the French Under-18's team in the European Under-18 Rugby Union Championship, where he earned multiple success; helping the team to European Champions in 2007 and 2008. In 2007, he joined Toulon for the 2007–08 Rugby Pro D2 season as an academy player, a position he was in until 2011. However, between joining the club in 2007 and making has debut in 2011, he played for the French Under-20s team in 2009 and 2010, helping France to 5th in the 2010 IRB Junior World Championship.

In 2011 he appeared for the first time as a full-time Toulon player. He made his debut on 10 November 2011 against Petrarca during the 2011–12 European Challenge Cup, Toulon was the victors on that occasion winning 53–22. He became a more consistent player in the 2012–13 Season, though he made most of his 21 appearances off the bench after consistently being behind English Prop Andrew Sheridan. However, an injury to Sheridan during the 2013–14 Season, saw Chiocci start in almost every match of the season, including the 23–6 win over Saracens in the 2014 Heineken Cup Final at the Millennium Stadium, Cardiff.

His form between 2012 and 2014 saw Chiocci called up to the France national team for the 2014 November Test matches against Fiji, Australia and Argentina. He debuted off the bench in the 40–15 win over Fiji.
