= 2014 Heineken Cup final =

2014 Heineken Cup Final
- Event: 2013–14 Heineken Cup
Toulon	Saracens
(France)	(England)
23	6
- Date: 24 May 2014
- Venue: Millennium Stadium, Cardiff
- Man of the Match: Craig Burden (Toulon)
- Referee: Alain Rolland (Ireland)
- Attendance: 67,578
- Weather: N/A (roof closed)

The 2014 Heineken Cup Final was the final match of the 2013–14 Heineken Cup, the 19th and final season of Europe's top club rugby union competition. The Heineken Cup was replaced by a new top-level competition, the European Rugby Champions Cup, effective in 2014–15. The match, between Toulon and Saracens, was played on 24 May 2014 in the Millennium Stadium in Cardiff, Wales, kicking off at 5 pm (16:00 UTC).

Toulon were the defending champions. Previously, Saracens had only reached the semi-finals of the Heineken Cup. The final result was 23–6 for Toulon to retain their title.

== Route to final ==
First round
6 April 2014
3	(France) Toulon	29
6	(Ireland) Leinster	14
5 April 2014
1	(Ireland) Ulster	15
8	(England) Saracens	17

Semifinals
27 April 2014
3	(France) Toulon	24
4	(Ireland) Munster	14
26 April 2014
8	(England) Saracens	46
2	(France) Clermont	6

Final
24 May 2014
(France) Toulon	23
(England) Saracens	6

=== Toulon ===
Toulon went into the knock-out stage seed 3, after earning five out of six victories in the pool stage. They topped pool 2 with 24 points respectively. They opened their campaign with a home 51–28 bonus point win over Glasgow Warriors, scoring six tries. They did however concede four tries, to give Glasgow a bonus point of their own. In round 2, they played Cardiff Blues at the Cardiff Arms Park. Cardiff earned a surprise 19–15 victory over the defending champions. Toulon failed to score any tries in this match, the first time Toulon has done this since their 24–12 win over Saracens in 2013. Their third game was a 14–9 victory over Exeter Chiefs at Sandy Park, in which Toulon failed to gain a bonus point. They however earned a bonus point in the return home fixture in round four, after scoring four tries in a 32–20 win over Exeter. Round five saw Toulon beat Cardiff Blues 43–20 at home to secure a knock-out stage seed. They finished their pool stage with a 15–8 win over Glasgow Warriors at Scotstoun, to confirm their knock-out seed and positioning.

Following the final pool stage match, the draw was made for the semi-finals. Toulon was drawn at home for the semi-final, should they win their quarter-final, which meant they would be the only team to have a home semi and quarter-final. Toulon faced top seed Leinster on 6 April. Toulon stormed into the semis with a 29–14 victory over the Irish Province. Toulon then faced another Irish province in Munster. Toulon decided they would play this match at Stade Vélodrome in Marseille. Munster indiscipline gave Toulon 21 of their 24 points though penalties, with Jonny Wilkinson's drop goal as the other Toulon score. In a tight match, Toulon only conceded four kickable penalties and one try to give Munster 16 points. This meant, Toulon would advance to the final on the back of a 24–16 win.

=== Saracens ===
Saracens went into the knock-out stage bottom of the seed table (8). They only won four matches during the pool stage, the first being a 23–17 win over Connacht away. Round two saw Saracens take their home match to Wembley Stadium, instead of Allianz Park, to face Toulouse. A record British attendance for a Heineken Cup pool game, saw Saracens narrowly lose to Toulouse 16–17, but managed to pick a single bonus point by virtue of losing by seven points or less. Saracens next played Zebre at Stadio XXV Aprile. It was believed that Saracens would walk away with this match, but Saracens were only able to put 29 points over the Italian side, winning 39–10. The return fixture however saw Saracens thrash Zebre 64–3, scoring nine tries and conceding just two penalties. They then went to Stade Ernest-Wallon to play Toulouse away. They lost again to the French side 21–11, put their strong defence kept Toulouse try-less. But their indiscipline, gave Toulouse 21 point though kick at goals. Their final match was at home, against Connacht. In a match where Saracens scored ten tries, Saracens booked their place a knock-out seed with a 64–6 victory over the Irish province.

Their quarter-final saw Saracens travel to Ulster, who were the only team to win six from six in the pool stages. However, in a controversial match, through the Jared Payne red card, Saracens scored 17 points to Ulster's 15 to progress to the semi-final. Due to the draw that followed the pool stage, Saracens had a home semi-final who choose to play the match at Twickenham. Saracens faced early favorites and last years runners-up Clermont at the RFU home stadium. The match saw Saracens earn a record, for the biggest winning margin in a Heineken Cup semi-final. Saracens overtook Leicester Tigers 37 point winning margin over London Wasps, by three, after they won 46–6 over Clermont. They kept Clermont scoreless in the second half, and scored six tries in the 80 minutes. This meant they would final progress to the Heineken Cup Final, and would face the defending champions.

== Match ==
=== Summary ===
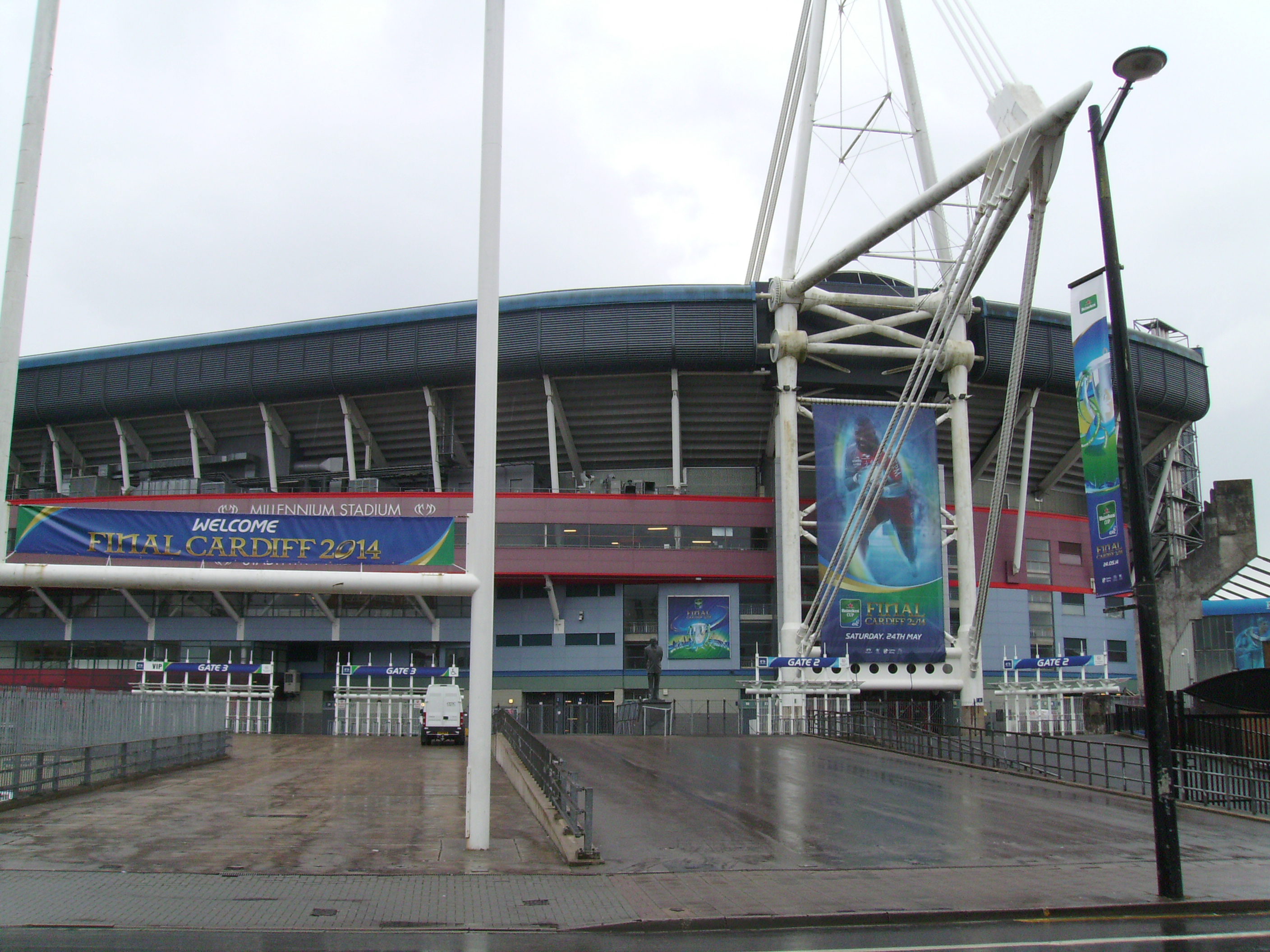
The Millennium Stadium on the 2014 finals weekend

Under a closed roof at the Millennium Stadium in Cardiff, the match kicked off at 5pm. Within three minutes, Owen Farrell had put Saracens into the lead with a penalty. Despite early pressure from Toulon, they conceded a second penalty in the 12th minute, but Marcelo Bosch failed to convert, the score remaining 3–0. On 21 minutes, Toulon's Juan Martín Fernández Lobbe was sin-binned for pulling down Alistair Hargreaves under a high kick, but Farrell failed to convert the resulting penalty. In the 29th minute, a chip into space from Matt Giteau found Drew Mitchell who, after beating the tackle of Alex Goode, passed back to Giteau who scored the first try of the final, converted by Jonny Wilkinson, and taking the score to 7–3 in Toulon's favour. Fernández Lobbe returned from the sin-bin and three minutes later, Wilkinson scored a drop goal, to take the score to 10–3 at half time.

Five minutes after the restart, and after a strong showing from Saracens, Farrell scored another penalty after a collapsed scrum, reducing the deficit to four points. However, on 53 minutes, Wilkinson restored the seven point lead with another penalty. Six minutes later, Toulon's Mathieu Bastareaud made a break and supplied Juan Smith with the ball, and after an exchange with Fernández Lobbe, Smith scored Toulon's second try, which Wilkinson converted to take the score to 20–6. A third penalty, three minutes later, took Wilkinson's tally to eleven points and Toulon's advantage to 17 points. Despite late pressure from Saracens, no further points were scored as Toulon won the match, and the final Heineken Cup, 23–6.

=== Details ===
24 May 2014
17:00 BST (UTC+01)

Toulon (France)	23–6	(England) Saracens
Try: Giteau 29' c Smith 59' c Con: Wilkinson (2/2); Pen: Wilkinson (2/2) 53', 63'; Drop: Wilkinson (1/1) 37'	Report	Pen: Farrell (2/3) 3', 45'

Millennium Stadium, Cardiff
Attendance: 67,578
Referee: Alain Rolland (IRFU)

Toulon	Saracens

FB	15	(England) Delon Armitage
RW	14	(Australia) Drew Mitchell
OC	13	(France) Mathieu Bastareaud
IC	12	(Australia) Matt Giteau
LW	11	(South Africa) Bryan Habana
FH	10	(England) Jonny Wilkinson (c)	(substituted off) 77'
SH	9	(France) Sébastien Tillous-Borde	(substituted off) 70'
N8	8	(England) Steffon Armitage
OF	7	(Argentina) Juan Martín Fernández Lobbe	(yellow card) 21' to 31'
BF	6	(South Africa) Juan Smith	(substituted off) 71'
RL	5	(South Africa) Danie Rossouw	(substituted off) 51'
LL	4	(South Africa) Bakkies Botha	(substituted off) 51'
TP	3	(New Zealand) Carl Hayman	(substituted off) 56'
HK	2	(South Africa) Craig Burden	(substituted off) 41'
LP	1	(France) Xavier Chiocci	(substituted off) 45'
Substitutions:
HK	16	(France) Jean-Charles Orioli	(substituted on) 41'
PR	17	(France) Alexandre Menini	(substituted on) 45'
PR	18	(Italy) Martin Castrogiovanni	(substituted on) 56'
LK	19	(New Zealand) Ali Williams	(substituted on) 51'
FL	20	(France) Virgile Bruni	(substituted on) 71'
CE	21	(France) Maxime Mermoz	(substituted on) 77'
SH	22	(South Africa) Michael Claassens	(substituted on) 70'
LK	23	(France) Jocelino Suta	(substituted on) 51'
Coach:
(France) Bernard Laporte

FB	15	(England) Alex Goode
RW	14	(England) Chris Ashton
OC	13	(Argentina) Marcelo Bosch
IC	12	(England) Brad Barritt
LW	11	(England) David Strettle	(substituted off) 69'
FH	10	(England) Owen Farrell	(substituted off) 64'
SH	9	(England) Richard Wigglesworth	(substituted off) 50'
N8	8	(England) Billy Vunipola
OF	7	(Namibia) Jacques Burger	(substituted off) 61'
BF	6	(Scotland) Kelly Brown
RL	5	(South Africa) Alistair Hargreaves	(substituted off) 64'
LL	4	(England) Steve Borthwick (c)
TP	3	(England) Matt Stevens	(substituted off) 54'
HK	2	(South Africa) Schalk Brits	(substituted off) 69'
LP	1	(England) Mako Vunipola	(substituted off) 64'
Substitutions:
HK	16	(England) Jamie George	(substituted on) 69'
PR	17	(England) Richard Barrington	(substituted on) 64'
PR	18	(Samoa) James Johnston	(substituted on) 54'
LK	19	(England) Mouritz Botha	(substituted on) 64'
FL	20	(England) Jackson Wray	(substituted on) 61'
SH	21	(South Africa) Neil de Kock	(substituted on) 50'
FH	22	(England) Charlie Hodgson	(substituted on) 64'
FB	23	(United States) Chris Wyles	(substituted on) 69'
Coach:
(Ireland) Mark McCall

Man of the Match:
(South Africa) Craig Burden (Toulon)

Touch judges:
(Ireland) George Clancy
(Wales) Leighton Hodges
Television match official:
(Wales) Gareth Simmonds
