= Xerom Civil =

Spanish rugby union player

- Born: 2 April 1994 (age 32) Bordeaux, France
- Height: 1.82 m (6 ft 0 in)
- Weight: 118 kg (18 st 8 lb)

Rugby union career
- Position(s): Hooker, Prop
- Current team: Bassin d'Arcachon
Youth career
- -: Union Bordeaux Bègles
Senior career
Years	Team	Apps	(Points)
2015–2017	Union Bordeaux Bègles	7	(0)
2017–2018	Carcassonne	20	(10)
2018–2019	Agen	13	(0)
2019–2021	Carcassonne	9	(10)
2021-	Bassin d'Arcachon		
- Correct as of 21 July 2024
International career
Years	Team	Apps	(Points)
2015–	Spain	13	(0)
- Correct as of 21 July 2024

Xerom Civil (born 13 April 1996) is a Spanish rugby union player who plays as a hooker for Bassin d'Arcachon in the Nationale 2. He also has caps playing for the Spanish National Rugby Union side. Although born in France, Civil holds dual nationality with Spain.

== Rugby Union Career ==
Civil began playing rugby at Union Bordeaux Bègles, where he rose to prominence as a rugby union prop in their youth side. He made his full senior debut during the 2016–17 Top 14 season. Civil dropped down a division to play for Carcassonne in Pro D2 the following season. Civil was signed by Agen for the 2018–19 Top 14 season. After just one Top 14 season Civil returned to Carcassonne ahead of the 2019-2020 French rugby union season.

Civil holds dual nationality and could have played for France but opted for Spain. He made his international debut on 21 November 2015 in Spain against Chile at Torrelavega.
