= Patrick Toetu =

Samoa international rugby union player

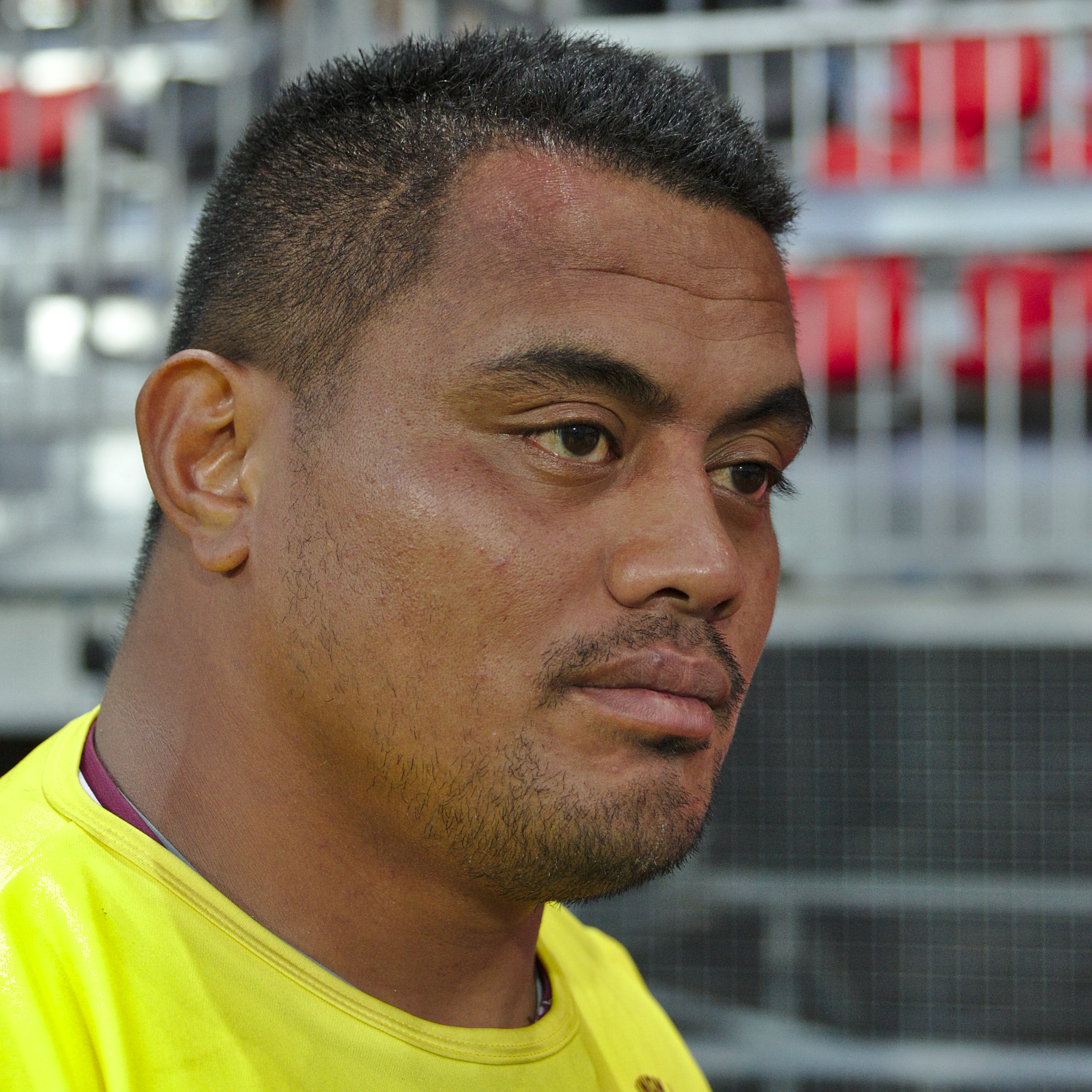
- Born: 14 March 1984 (age 42)
- Height: 5 ft 11 in (180 cm)
- Weight: 264 lb (120 kg)

Rugby union career
- Position: Prop
Senior career
Years	Team	Apps	(Points)
2007–11	Tarbes PR		
2011–16	Union Bordeaux Bègles		
2016–17	CA Brive		
2017–20	SC Albi		
International career
Years	Team	Apps	(Points)
2014	Samoa	1	(0)

Patrick Toetu (born 14 March 1984) is a New Zealand-born Samoan former international rugby union player.

== Rugby career ==
Born in Auckland and of Samoan descent, Toetu was a burly prop, based in France from 2007. He started out with Tarbes Pyrénées, before getting an opportunity to compete in the Top 14 when he joined Union Bordeaux Bègles in the 2011–12 season. Following his time in Bordeaux, Toetu had stints with CA Brive and SC Albi.

Toetu earned his solitary Samoa cap off the bench against Italy at Ascoli Piceno in 2014.

== See also ==
- List of Samoa national rugby union players
