= Pierre Bernard (rugby union) =

French rugby union player

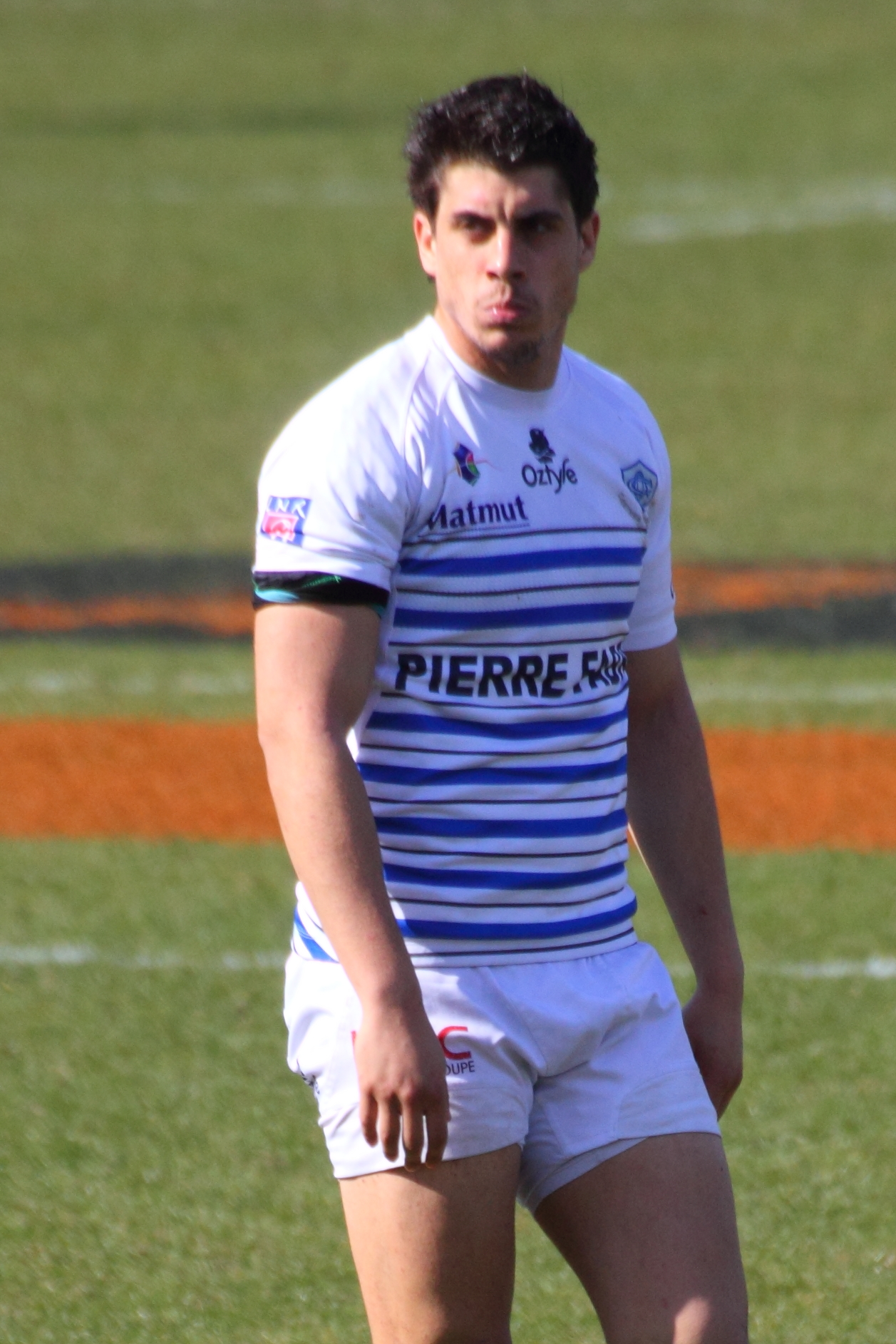
- Born: Pierre Bernard; 31 January 1989 (age 37) Toulouse, France
- Height: 1.87 m (6 ft 1 1/2 in)
- Weight: 87 kg (13 st 10 lb)

Rugby union career
- Position: Fly-half
- Current team: Biarritz
Senior career
Years	Team	Apps	(Points)
2008–2010	Bayonne	11	(39)
2010–2013	Castres	69	(181)
2013–2016	Bordeaux Bègles	75	(742)
2016–2017	Toulon	21	(114)
2017–	Biarritz	48	(322)
- Correct as of 17 August 2017

Pierre Bernard (born 31 January 1989) is a French rugby union player, currently playing for the Rugby Pro D2 team Biarritz Olympique having previously been at Toulon.
