= Alexandre Menini =

French rugby union player (born 1983)

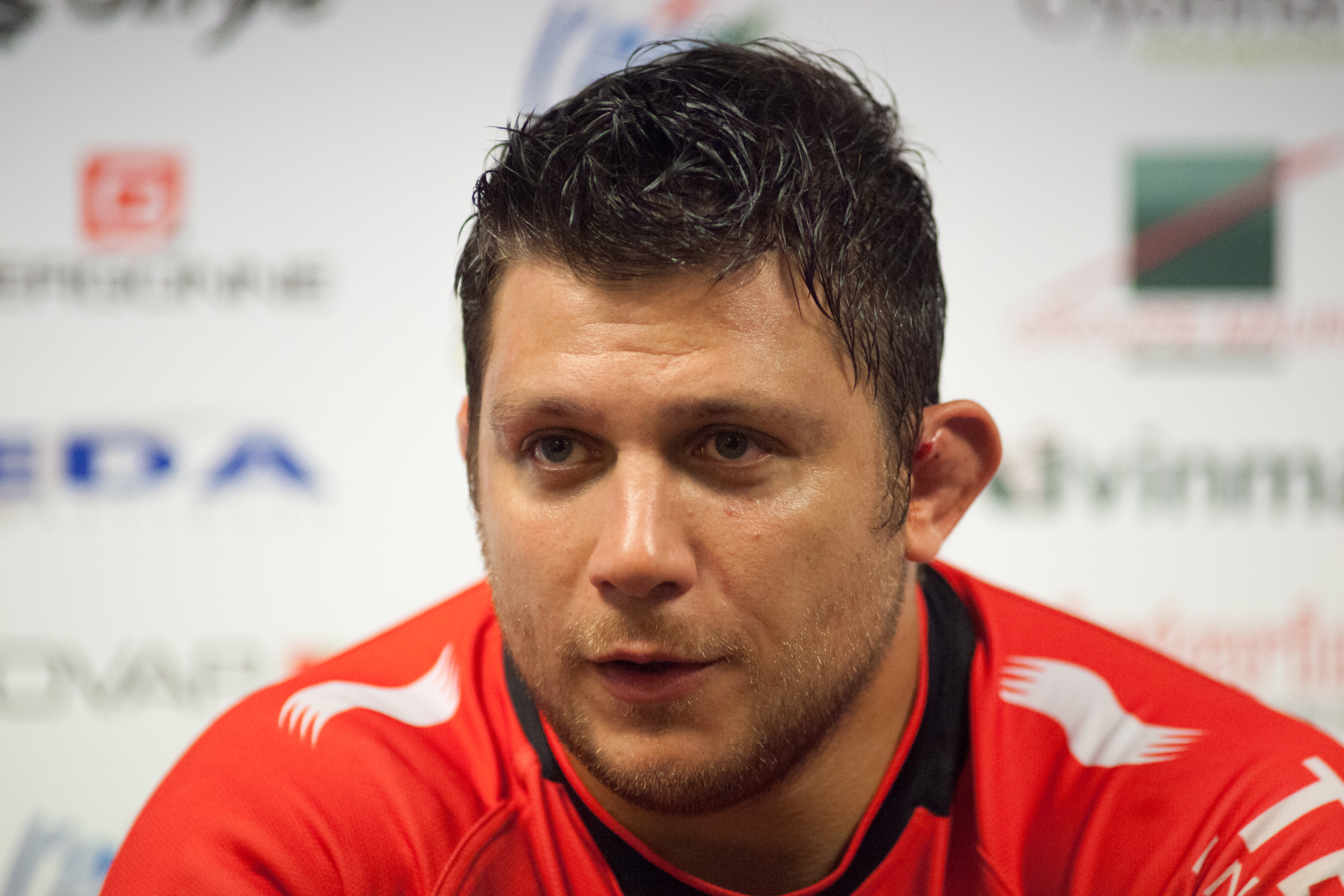
- Born: 5 August 1983 (age 43) Basse-Ham, France
- Height: 1.83 m (6 ft 0 in)
- Weight: 115 kg (254 lb)

Rugby union career
- Position: Prop
Amateur team(s)
Years	Team	Apps	(Points)
2006-2007	Rumilly		
- Correct as of 1 February 2015
Senior career
Years	Team	Apps	(Points)
2005–06	Oyonnax	11	(0)
2007–09	Béziers	40	(10)
2009–10	Pays d'Aix RC	27	(5)
2010–2013	Stade Montois	82	(5)
2013–14	Biarritz	14	(0)
2014	→Toulon (Medical Joker)	7	(0)
2014-2016	Toulon	42	(10)
2016-2019	Lyon	67	(5)
- Correct as of 24 January 2015
International career
Years	Team	Apps	(Points)
2014–2015	France	6	(0)
- Correct as of 7 February 2015

Alexandre Menini (born 5 August 1983) is a retired French rugby union player, who played prop for Top 14 side Toulon. He previously played for Oyonnax, Béziers, Pays d'Aix RC, Stade Montois and Biarritz.

== Career ==
Menini's rugby career started out in 2005, when playing for Oyonnax in the 2005–06 Rugby Pro D2 season. During that season, he rarely played, only appearing 8 times in that season. He remained with the club for the following season, where he was used a dual-team player, representing Oyonnax in the 2006–07 Rugby Pro D2 season, and representing amateur side Rumilly in the Fédérale 1. He switched teams for the 2007–08 and 2008–09 Rugby Pro D2 season's, representing Béziers. He played more regularly for this team, though used mostly as an impact player of the bench in his first season. Though in his second season, he made 15 starting appearances. He signed with Pays d'Aix RC for the 2009–10 season following Béziers' relegation at the end of the 2008–09 season. Though he only played for Pays d'Aix RC for one season, signing for Stade Montois in 2010. He developed his scrimmaging abilities while playing for Montois, helping them to promotion to the Top 14 for the 2012–13 season. Unfortunately for Stade Montois, they were only able to stay in the top flight French league for one season, finishing last and being relegated back down to the Pro D2.

In July 2013, Menini signed with Biarritz, after impressing head coach Laurent Rodriguez, who believed Menini is likely to push hard for a spot in the starting XV. He said that Menini was impressive in a poor Stade Montois Campaign. He continued to develop into a world class prop, being signed by Champions Toulon in March 2014 as a Medical Joker for the Props. He was a stand out performer for Toulon, making three starts from seven appearances. His most notable, a bench place in the 2014 Heineken Cup Final.

Menini was selected for the France national side for their 2014 Australian June Test Series, and was a surprise inclusion for a starting position in the second test. He ran out on the 14 June and played 49 minutes in his first test match. France lost 6–0.

After the test series, Menini joined Toulon full-time after Biarritz were relegated after the 2013–14 Season.
