= Félix Le Bourhis =

French rugby union player (born 1988)

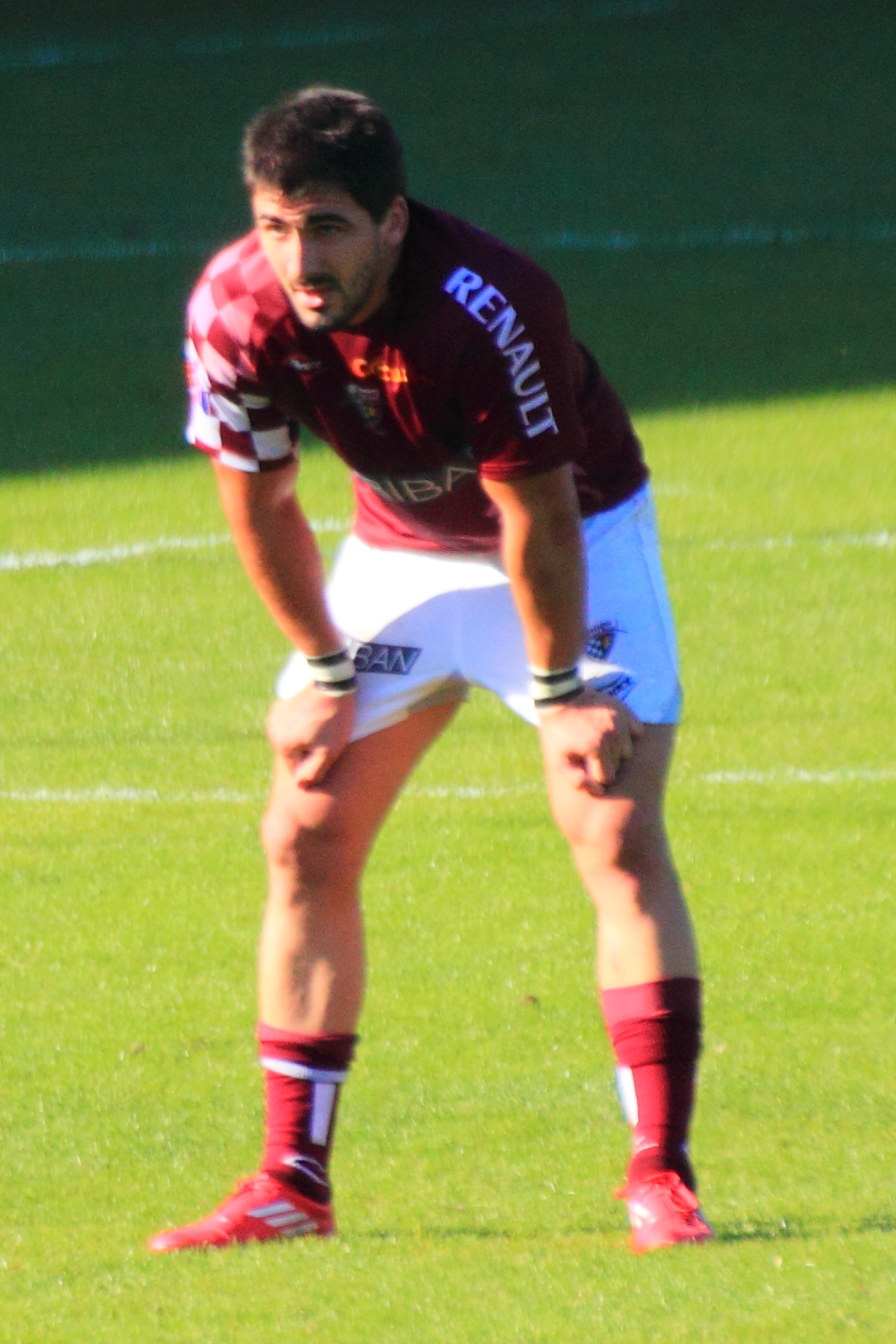
- Born: 7 April 1988 (age 38) Pithiviers, France
- Height: 6 ft 0 in (183 cm)
- Weight: 200 lb (91 kg)

Rugby union career
- Position: Centre / Wing
International career
Years	Team	Apps	(Points)
2014	France	1	(0)

Félix Le Bourhis (born 7 April 1988) is a French former rugby union international.

Le Bourhis, born in Pithiviers, is of Breton and Spanish descent.

In 2014, while playing with Union Bordeaux Bègles, Le Bourhis earned a call up to the national team for a mid-year tour of Australia. He debuted against the Wallabies in the first Test in Brisbane, starting on the wing, but was substituted during the second half and didn't return for the remaining two matches.

== See also ==
- List of France national rugby union players
