= Gagi Bazadze =

Georgian rugby player

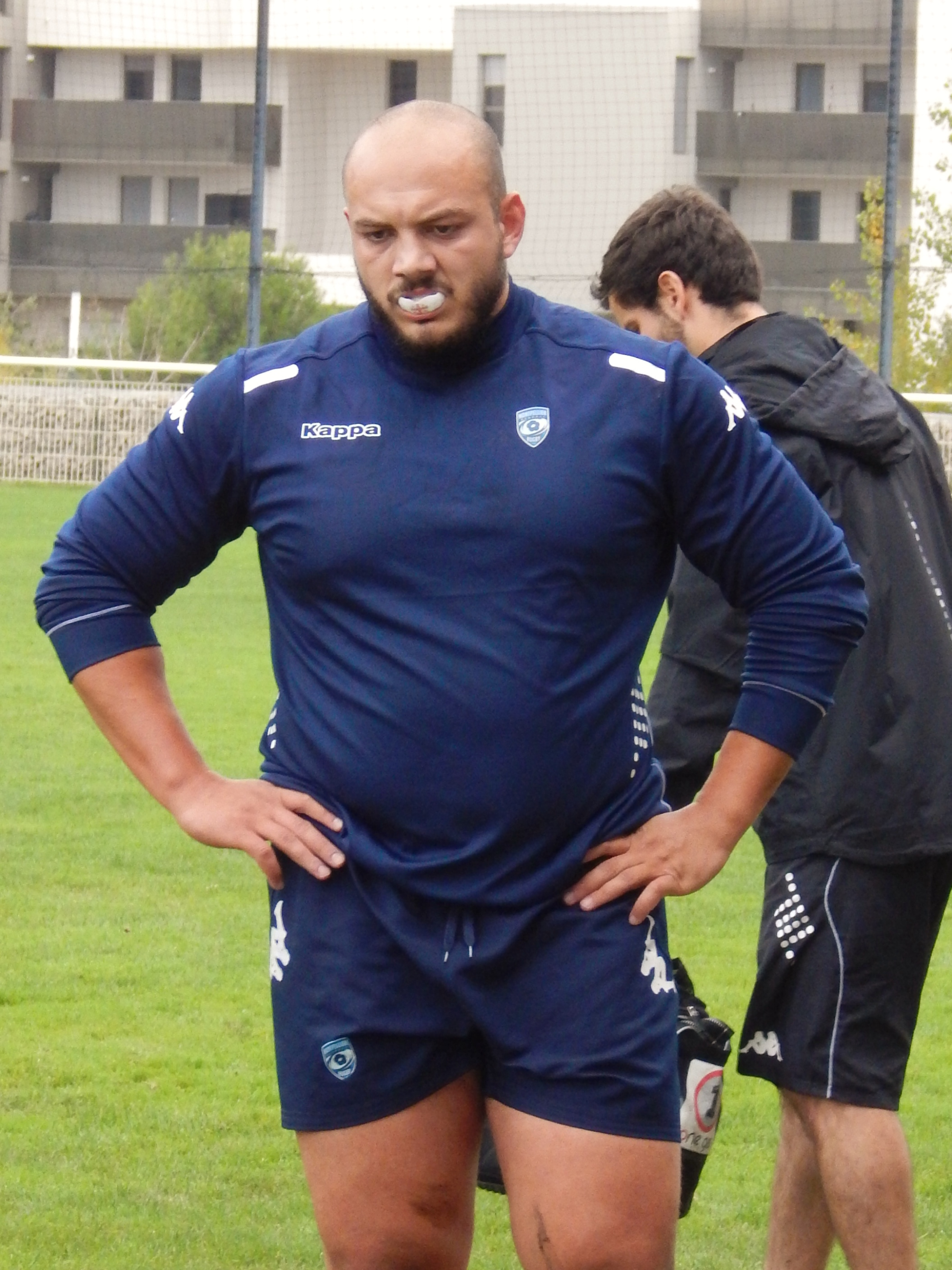
- Born: 12 September 1992 (age 34) Kutaisi, Georgia
- Height: 1.88 m (6 ft 2 in)
- Weight: 131 kg (289 lb; 20 st 9 lb)

Rugby union career
- Position: Prop
Amateur team(s)
Years	Team	Apps	(Points)
2011	Old Blue		
Senior career
Years	Team	Apps	(Points)
2012–2014	Montpellier	0	(0)
2014–2015	RC Massy	1	(0)
2015–2016	La Rochelle	18	(5)
2016–2017	Montpellier	8	(5)
2017-	Agen	0	(0)
- Correct as of 31 August 2016
International career
Years	Team	Apps	(Points)
2011	USA U20		
- Correct as of 21 July 2016

Gagi Bazadze (born September 12, 1992) is a Georgian rugby player. His position is prop and he currently plays for Montpellier in the Top 14.

Bazadze played in the U.S. for the New York amateur club Old Blue R.F.C. The next year, he began his career in France when he signed with Montpellier Hérault Rugby as an espoir player. He went on to play for RC Massy in the 2014–15 season and was set to play with Lille Métropole until they were denied a place in Pro D2 that season. He would sign with La Rochelle instead, where he would make his Top 14 debut against Montpellier.

== International ==
Bazadze was called into the United States U-20 assembly in 2011. Bazadze has yet to play senior international rugby, but is eligible to play for both Georgia and the United States.
