= Johan Goosen =

South African professional rugby union player

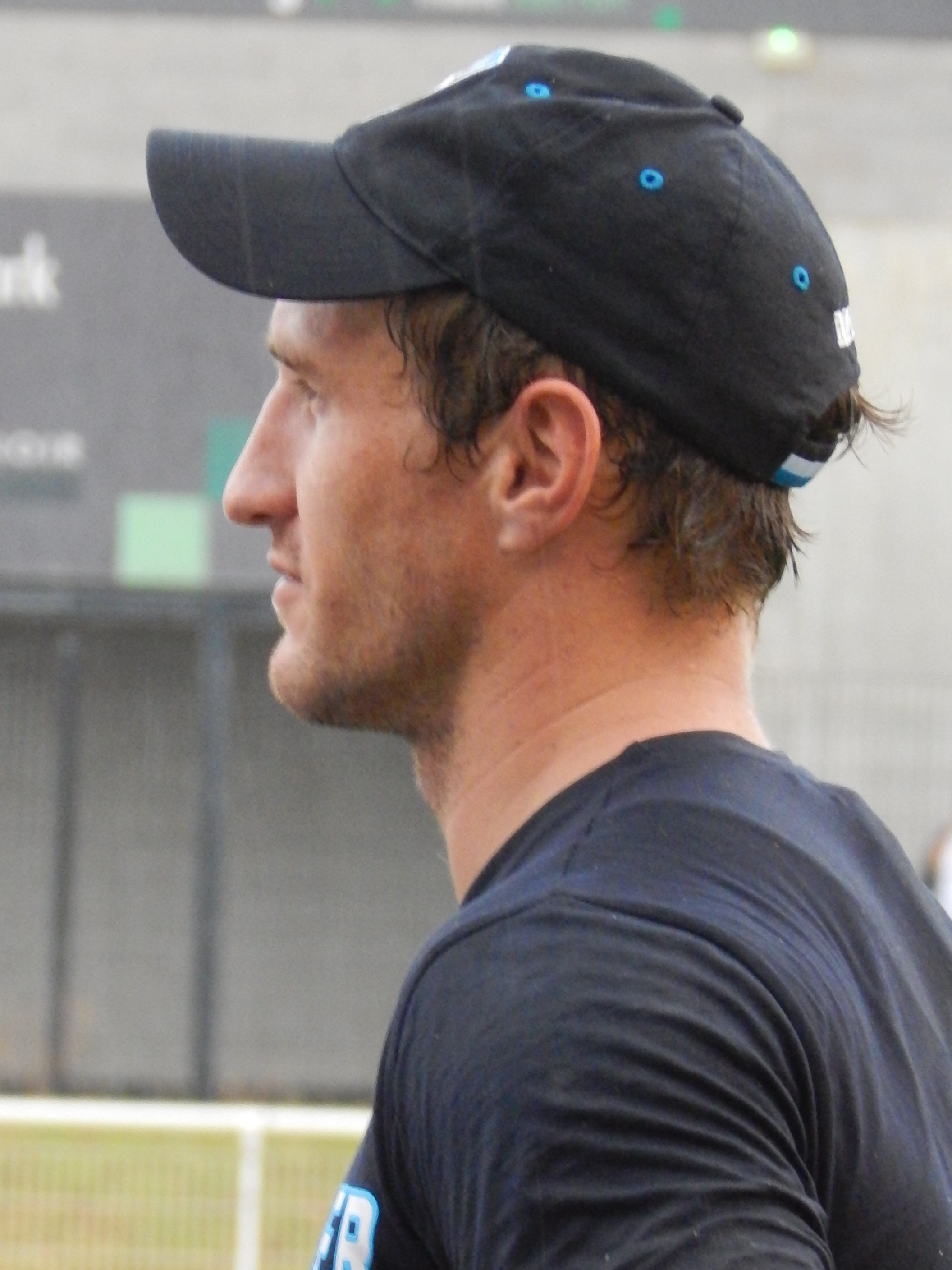
- Full name: Johannes Lodewikus Goosen
- Born: 27 July 1992 (age 34) Burgersdorp, South Africa
- Height: 1.85 m (6 ft 1 in)
- Weight: 89 kg (14 st 0 lb; 196 lb)
- School: Grey College

Rugby union career
- Position: Fly-half / Fullback /Outside Centre
- Current team: Bulls / Blue Bulls
Youth career
- 2005: Border
- 2008–2010: Free State Cheetahs
Senior career
Years	Team	Apps	(Points)
2011	Emerging Cheetahs	1	(0)
2011–2014	Free State Cheetahs	17	(143)
2012–2014	Cheetahs	27	(331)
2014–2016	Racing 92	51	(237)
2018	Cheetahs	3	(10)
2018–2021	Montpellier	35	(53)
2021–	Blue Bulls	8	(99)
2021–	Bulls	51	(378)
- Correct as of 17 July 2025
International career
Years	Team	Apps	(Points)
2011	South Africa U20	5	(79)
2012–2016	South Africa	13	(25)
2014	Springbok XV	1	(9)
- Correct as of 18 July 2019

Johannes Lodewikus Goosen (born 27 July 1992) is a South African professional rugby union player. He plays as a fly-half, full-back or centre for the Bulls and the Blue Bulls, competing in the United Rugby Championship and the Currie Cup.

== Career ==
=== Youth ===
He was a member of the South Africa Under 20 team that competed in the 2011 IRB Junior World Championship and was also named in the squad for the 2012 tournament, but had to withdraw due to a shoulder injury sustained on 28 April in a Super Rugby match against the Highlanders. At the time of his injury, Goosen was the leading points scorer in his debut season of super rugby with 145 points from 9 games. The total included 3 tries, 17 conversions, 31 penalties and a drop goal.

=== International debut ===
Goosen made his South African debut on 8 September 2012 against Australia in a 26–19 defeat in Perth. He came off the bench as replacement fly half for Morné Steyn in the 59th minute of the game. The following two weekends he was in the starting line-up for the Springboks as fly-half, where he performed well. Unfortunately he suffered a knee injury on 18 March 2013 during a Cheetah training session in Sydney and he also missed the rest of the Springboks' Test matches in 2013.

=== Departure to France and temporary career-ending ===
Goosen signed a three-year deal with French Top 14 side Racing 92 for the 2014–15 Top 14 season. In the final of the 2015–16 Top 14 season Goosen scored three penalties as Racing defeated Toulon. Despite later signing a contract extension to remain in Paris until 2020, he later announced his retirement from rugby in December 2016 to take up a role as a commercial director at an agricultural company in South Africa. Goosen has since opened up about believing this decision to have been a mistake.

=== Return to rugby ===
Goosen made his return to competitive rugby in April 2018 when he was named in the matchday squad for the Cheetahs' match against Munster in Round 20 of the Pro14 competition.

Goosen then signed for French giants Montpellier back in the Top 14 competition ahead of the 2018–19 season. The club reportedly paid around €1.5 million to buy him out from his Racing contract. He rewarded the faith by helping his team toward winning the European Challenge Cup in 2021, putting in a man-of-the-match performance against Leicester in the final.

On 16 April 2021, Goosen returned to South Africa to sign for the Bulls for the next season.

== Style of play ==
Being able to play at several positions (fly-half, centre and full-back), he can usually be described as a utility back.

== Honours ==
=== Racing 92 ===
- Top 14 winner 2015–16
- European Rugby Champions Cup runner up 2015–16

=== Montpellier ===
- European Rugby Challenge Cup winner 2020-21

=== Bulls ===
URC Gilbert Golden Boot award for 2022/2023 season.
