= 2015–16 Premiership Rugby =

Rugby union competition in England

2015–16 Aviva Premiership
- Countries: England
- Date: 16 October 2015 – 28 May 2016
- Champions: Saracens (3rd title)
- Runners-up: Exeter Chiefs
- Relegated: London Irish
- Matches played: 135
- Attendance: 1,837,427 (average 13,611 per match)
- Tries scored: 634 (average 4.7 per match)
- Top point scorer: Gareth Steenson (Exeter) (258 points)
- Top try scorer: Thomas Waldrom (Exeter) (13 tries)

Official website
- www.premiershiprugby.com

The 2015–16 Aviva Premiership was the 29th season of the top flight English domestic rugby union competition and the sixth one to be sponsored by Aviva. The reigning champions entering the season were Saracens, who had claimed their second title after defeating Bath in the 2015 final. Worcester Warriors had been promoted as champions from the 2014–15 RFU Championship at the first attempt.

The competition was broadcast by BT Sport for the third successive season. Highlights of each weekend's games were shown on ITV4.

== Summary ==
Saracens won their third title after defeating Exeter Chiefs in the final at Twickenham having also topped the regular season table. London Irish were relegated after being unable to win their penultimate game of the season. It was the second time that London Irish have been relegated from the top flight since the leagues began and the first time since the 1993–94 Premiership Rugby season.

The competition began slightly later than normal, due to the 2015 Rugby World Cup taking place in England and in a slight change to usual, the London Double Header at Twickenham, the twelfth instance since its inception in 2004, was played in round 5 instead of round 1.

== Rule changes ==
This season was the first of several significant changes to the Premiership's salary cap regulations:

- The base salary cap, which was £4.76 million in 2014–15, rose to £5.1 million.
- The amount of "academy credits" available to each club—credits against the cap for younger players on the senior squad who were developed at the club—rose from £240,000 to £400,000. The number of "academy credits" remained at eight, as in past seasons, but the credit per player rose from £30,000 to £50,000. A club that could use all of its available credits in both 2014–15 and 2015–16 saw its effective cap rise from £5 million to £5.5 million.
- Each club is now allowed to exclude two players from the salary cap calculations, up from one in 2014–15. However, the two slots for what the Premiership calls "excluded players" differ in how they can be used. The first slot can be used on a player on the club's current roster. The new slot can only be used for a player who had not been in the Premiership during the 12 months preceding the start of his contract. In a change from the rules that prevailed from 2011 to 2012 through to 2014–15, a player's presence on or absence from a Rugby World Cup roster is no longer relevant to his status as an excluded player.

In addition to the above, a standard cap provision applicable only in Rugby World Cup years, gave each club a £35,000 cap credit (up from £30,000 in the last World Cup season of 2011–12) for each member of the senior squad who participated in the tournament.

== Teams ==
Twelve teams compete in the league – the top eleven teams from the previous season and Worcester Warriors who were promoted from the 2014–15 RFU Championship after a top flight absence of one year. They replaced London Welsh who were relegated after one year in the top flight.

=== Stadiums and locations ===
2015–16 Aviva Premiership Teams

Club	Director of Rugby / Head Coach	Captain	Stadium	Capacity	City/Area
Bath	(England) Mike Ford	(England) Stuart Hooper	The Recreation Ground	13,516	Bath, Somerset
Exeter Chiefs	(England) Rob Baxter	(England) Jack Yeandle	Sandy Park	12,300	Exeter, Devon
Gloucester	(Ireland) David Humphreys	(England) Billy Twelvetrees	Kingsholm	16,121	Gloucester
Harlequins	(Ireland) Conor O'Shea	(England) Danny Care	Twickenham Stoop (Note: Harlequins will also play a home game at Twickenham Stadium on 27 December 2015)	14,816	Twickenham, Greater London
Leicester Tigers	(England) Richard Cockerill	(England) Ed Slater	Welford Road	25,800 (Note: Welford Road's capacity was limited to 22,500 until the 3,100 capacity West Stand was completed and which brought the capacity up to 25,800. This date was originally for the start of the season but was withheld until December 2015)	Leicester
London Irish	(New Zealand) Tom Coventry	(England) George Skivington (England) Luke Narraway	Madejski Stadium (Note: London Irish will also play a home game at Twickenham Stadium on 28 November 2015 and a home game at the Red Bull Arena on 12 March 2016)	24,161	Reading, Berkshire
Newcastle Falcons	(England) John Wells	(England) Will Welch	Kingston Park	10,200	Newcastle, Tyne and Wear
Northampton Saints	(England) Jim Mallinder	(England) Lee Dickson	Franklin's Gardens (Note: Northampton Saints will also play a home game at Stadium mk on 24 October 2015)	15,500	Northampton
Sale Sharks	(England) Steve Diamond	(New Zealand) Daniel Braid	AJ Bell Stadium	12,000	Salford, Greater Manchester
Saracens	(Ireland) Mark McCall	(South Africa) Brad Barritt	Allianz Park (Note: Saracens will also play a home game at Twickenham Stadium on 28 November 2015 and a home game at Wembley Stadium on 16 April 2016)	10,000 (Note: Allianz Park typically has a capacity of 10,000 but this can be raised to 15,000 with temporary seating)	Hendon, Greater London
Wasps	(Wales) Dai Young	(England) James Haskell (England) Matt Mullan	Ricoh Arena	32,609	Coventry, West Midlands
Worcester Warriors	(England) Dean Ryan	(South Africa) GJ van Velze	Sixways Stadium	12,024	Worcester

== Pre-season ==
The 2015 edition of the Singha Premiership Rugby Sevens was held in August. Once again, the four Welsh Regions contested a group, alongside the twelve Premiership clubs, which were split into three groups. The top two sides from each group contested the series final at the Twickenham Stoop on 28 August. The series was won by Welsh region Newport Gwent Dragons who beat Premiership side Wasps in the final.

== Table ==
2015–16 Premiership Rugby table
Pos	Team	Pld	W	D	L	PF	PA	PD	TF	TA	TB	LB	Pts	Qualification or relegation
1	Saracens (C)	22	17	1	4	580	376	+204	60	36	8	2	80	Play-off place, Berth in the 2016–17 European Rugby Champions Cup
2	Exeter Chiefs (RU)	22	15	0	7	585	361	+224	71	40	8	6	74	Play-off place, Berth in the 2016–17 European Rugby Champions Cup
3	Wasps (SF)	22	15	0	7	598	397	+201	71	42	9	3	72	Play-off place, Berth in the 2016–17 European Rugby Champions Cup
4	Leicester Tigers (SF)	22	14	0	8	509	475	+34	55	48	6	3	65	Play-off place, Berth in the 2016–17 European Rugby Champions Cup
5	Northampton Saints	22	12	0	10	455	392	+63	51	35	5	7	60	Berth in the 2016–17 European Rugby Champions Cup
6	Sale Sharks	22	11	2	9	456	459	−3	53	52	6	4	58	Berth in the 2016–17 European Rugby Champions Cup
7	Harlequins	22	10	1	11	547	583	−36	55	66	6	7	55	2016–17 European Rugby Challenge Cup
8	Gloucester	22	10	1	11	429	423	+6	36	44	2	5	49	2016–17 European Rugby Challenge Cup
9	Bath	22	9	0	13	435	460	−25	47	43	4	8	48	2016–17 European Rugby Challenge Cup
10	Worcester Warriors	22	7	0	15	420	597	−177	47	74	2	5	35	2016–17 European Rugby Challenge Cup
11	Newcastle Falcons	22	5	1	16	357	556	−199	34	62	0	5	27	2016–17 European Rugby Challenge Cup
12	London Irish (Note: As the champion of the Championship (Bristol Bears) are eligible for promotion.) (R)	22	4	0	18	328	620	−292	36	74	0	4	20	Relegated

Source: Premiership Rugby
Rules for classification: Tiebreakers for teams tied on points: 1) Number of matches won; 2) Difference between points for and against; 3) Total number of points for; 4) Aggregate number of points scored in matches between tied teams; 5) Number of matches won excluding the first match, then the second and so on until the tie is settled
(C) Champions; (RU) Runners-up; (SF) Losing semi-finalists; (R) Relegated

== Regular season ==
Fixtures for the season were announced by Premiership Rugby at 11am on 3 July 2015. Unlike previous seasons, the London Double Header would not take place in round 1 because Twickenham Stadium was being used for the 2015 Rugby World Cup, but would instead take place during round 5, on 28 November 2015.

One game during this season was played on foreign soil, in the United States. The London Irish v Saracens match – played in Round 16 on 12 March 2016 – took place at the Red Bull Arena in Harrison, New Jersey.

=== Round 1 ===
16 October 2015
19:45

Harlequins	26–21	Wasps (1 BP)
Try: N. Evans 24' c Lowe 46' c Con: N. Evans (2/2); Pen: N. Evans (4/5) 8', 14', 70', 74'	Report	Try: Cooper-Woolley 15' m Daly 75' c Con: Jackson (1/1); Pen: Gopperth (3/4) 3', 29', 59'

Twickenham Stoop
Attendance: 13,479
Referee: Luke Pearce

16 October 2015
19:45

Worcester Warriors	13–12	Northampton Saints (1 BP)
Try: van Velze 30' c Con: Heathcote (1/1); Pen: Heathcote (1/4) 10'; Drop: Heathcote (1/1) 80'	Report	Pen: Myler (4/4) 4', 6', 44', 78'

Sixways Stadium
Attendance: 8,483
Referee: Greg Garner

16 October 2015
20:00

Newcastle Falcons	27–39	Gloucester
Try: Hammersley 49' c Harris 59' c McGuigan 71' c Con: Delany (3/3); Pen: Delany (2/2) 11', 54'	Report	Try: Kvesic 25' m Sharples 28' c Con: Twelvetrees (1/2); Pen: Twelvetrees (9/11) 5', 9', 15', 20', 40', 48', 58', 62', 74'

Kingston Park
Attendance: 5,049
Referee: Thomas Foley

17 October 2015
14:00

Bath	19–17	Exeter Chiefs (1 BP)
Try: Hooper 35' c Con: Ford (1/1); Pen: Ford (4/4) 6', 46', 53', 77'	Report	Try: Short 1' m Pen: Steenson (4/4) 9', 40', 51', 66'

The Recreation Ground
Attendance: 12,957
Referee: Tim Wigglesworth

17 October 2015
14:00

(1 BP) Saracens	41–3	Sale Sharks
Try: Rhodes 3' c Streather 28' c Ellery (2) 39' c, 61' c Fraser 74' c Con: Hodgson (4/4); Goode (1/1); Pen: Hodgson (2/2) 16', 23'	Report	Pen: Cipriani (1/2) 18'

Allianz Park
Attendance: 7,231
Referee: Dean Richards

18 October 2015
15:15

London Irish	16–28	Leicester Tigers
Try: Sinclair 22' c Con: Noakes (1/1); Pen: Noakes (3/4) 15', 37', 45'	Report	Try: Betham 9' c Con: Bell (1/1); Pen: Bell (7/8) 1', 18', 25', 40', 59', 74', 79'

Madejski Stadium
Attendance: 6,597
Referee: Matthew Carley

=== Round 2 ===
23 October 2015
19:45

(1 BP) Gloucester	15–17	Saracens
Pen: Twelvetrees (5/6) 28', 33', 50', 61', 74'	Report	Try: Ellery 14' m Pen: Hodgson (1/1) 21'; Farrell (3/4) 40', 68', 76'

Kingsholm
Attendance: 12,749
Referee: Matthew Carley

23 October 2015
20:00

(1 BP) Sale Sharks	27–13	Worcester Warriors
Try: Cipriani 6' m Seymour 29' m Beaumont 44' c Leota 80' c Con: Cipriani (2/4); Pen: Cipriani (1/2) 40'	Report	Try: Arr 64' c Con: Lamb (1/1); Pen: Mills (2/2) 16', 27'

AJ Bell Stadium
Attendance: 4,356
Referee: Luke Pearce

24 October 2015
13:45

(1 BP) Northampton Saints	42–16	Newcastle Falcons
Try: Day (2) 4' c, 54' c Burrell 57' m Foden (2) 64' c, 70' c Con: Myler (4/5); Pen: Myler (3/3) 9', 12', 38'	Report	Try: Penny 67' c Con: Catterick (1/1); Pen: Delany (3/3) 14', 29', 36'

Stadium mk
Attendance: 20,034
Referee: Dean Richards

24 October 2015
14:00

Wasps	16–9	Bath (1 BP)
Try: penalty try 53' c Con: Gopperth (1/1); Pen: Gopperth (3/5) 20', 34', 59'	Report	Pen: Ford (3/3) 29', 66', 73'

Ricoh Arena
Attendance: 10,093
Referee: Craig Maxwell-Keys

24 October 2015
18:00

(1 BP) Exeter Chiefs	38–11	London Irish
Try: Steenson 11' m Armand 21' c Cowan-Dickie 26' c Short 41' c Nowell (2) 49' m, 77' c Con: Steenson (4/6)	Report	Try: Cowan 54' m Pen: Noakes (2/2) 15', 35'

Sandy Park
Attendance: 7,130
Referee: Andrew Small

25 October 2015
14:00

Leicester Tigers	22–19	Harlequins (1 BP)
Try: Pearce 71' c Con: O. Williams (1/1); Pen: Bell (5/6) 10', 14', 19', 28', 44'	Report	Try: Clifford 34' c Con: N. Evans (1/1); Pen: N. Evans (4/5) 12', 22', 41', 55'

Welford Road
Attendance: 17,510
Referee: Thomas Foley

=== Round 3 ===
31 October 2015
13:00

Saracens	24–14	London Irish
Try: Wray 50' m Goode 61' c Con: Farrell (1/2); Pen: Farrell (4/6) 15', 46', 69', 75'	Report	Try: Tikoirotuma 26' c Halavatau 66' c Con: Noakes (1/1); Geraghty (1/1)

Allianz Park
Attendance: 7,932
Referee: Greg Garner

31 October 2015
13:30

Bath	28–38	Harlequins
Try: Eastmond 30' c Auterac 75' m Rokoduguni 80' c Con: Ford (2/3); Pen: Ford (3/3) 13', 38', 56'	Report	Try: Care 43' c Ward 71' c Con: N. Evans (2/2); Pen: N. Evans (8/8) 7', 17', 34', 36', 42', 49', 53', 61'

The Recreation Ground
Attendance: 13,065
Referee: Matthew Carley

31 October 2015
14:00

Gloucester	24–22	Worcester Warriors (1 BP)
Try: Hibbard 2' m Kalamafoni 14' m Halaifonua 59' m Pen: Twelvetrees (3/4) 13', 20', 34'	Report	Try: Vuna (2) 4' c, 48' m Annett 30' c Con: Heathcote (2/2); Pen: Mills (1/1) 22'

Kingsholm
Attendance: 12,913
Referee: Craig Maxwell-Keys

1 November 2015
13:00

Newcastle Falcons	3–41	Exeter Chiefs (1 BP)
Pen: Delany (1/1) 5'	Report	Try: Chudley 6' c Salvi 13' c Armand (2) 20' m, 39' c Jess 31' m Low 66' c Con: Steenson (4/6); Pen: Steenson (1/1) 80'

Kingston Park
Attendance: 5,160
Referee: Ian Tempest

1 November 2015
14:30

Sale Sharks	20–13	Northampton Saints (1 BP)
Try: James 35' c Addison 44' c Con: Cipriani (2/2); Pen: Cipriani (2/4) 17', 22'	Report	Try: Myler 53' c Con: Myler (1/1); Pen: Myler (2/2) 30', 33'

AJ Bell Stadium
Attendance: 5,072
Referee: Andrew Small

1 November 2015
15:15

Leicester Tigers	24–16	Wasps
Try: Goneva 4' c Veainu 60' m Con: O. Williams (1/2); Pen: O. Williams (4/5) 13', 19', 48', 68'	Report	Try: Cittadini 77' c Con: Jackson (1/1); Pen: Gopperth (2/2) 8', 27'; Daly (1/1) 24'

Welford Road
Attendance: 19,746
Referee: Tim Wigglesworth

=== Round 4 ===
6 November 2015
19:45

Harlequins	16–14	Sale Sharks (1 BP)
Try: Visser 47' c Con: N. Evans (1/1); Pen: N. Evans (3/4) 37', 43', 54'	Report	Try: Braid 16' c James 64' c Con: Cipriani (2/2)

Twickenham Stoop
Attendance: 12,157
Referee: Tim Wigglesworth

7 November 2015
15:00

London Irish	14–45	Bath (1 BP)
Try: Steele 26' c Mulchrone 51' c Con: Geraghty (2/2)	Report	Try: Houston 15' c Devoto 22' c Fa'osiliva 41' c Eastmond 43' c Priestland 69' c Matawalu 79' c Con: Priestland (2/2); T. Homer (2/2); Ford (2/2); Pen: Priestland (1/2) 6'

Madejski Stadium
Attendance: 6,641
Referee: Thomas Foley

7 November 2015
15:00

(1 BP) Worcester Warriors	28–20	Newcastle Falcons
Try: Pennell 5' c Heem 20' c Grove (2) 28' c, 37' c Con: Heathcote (4/4)	Report	Try: M. Young 13' c Catterick 39' c Con: Delany (2/2); Pen: Delany (1/2) 33'; Catterick (1/1) 49'

Sixways Stadium
Attendance: 7,987
Referee: JP Doyle

7 November 2015
15:15

(1 BP) Northampton Saints	6–12	Saracens
Pen: Myler (1/2) 2'; Hanrahan (1/1) 80'	Report	Pen: Farrell (4/4) 34', 40', 46', 68'

Franklin's Gardens
Attendance: 15,169
Referee: Luke Pearce

7 November 2015
17:30

Exeter Chiefs	19–6	Leicester Tigers
Try: Steenson 5' c Con: Steenson (1/1); Pen: Steenson (4/4) 37', 40', 74', 76'	Report	Pen: O. Williams (2/2) 38', 62'

Sandy Park
Attendance: 10,102
Referee: Greg Garner

8 November 2015
15:00

Wasps	23–3	Gloucester
Try: Wade 18' c penalty try 51' c Con: Jackson (2/2); Pen: Daly (3/4) 9', 26', 32'	Report	Pen: Laidlaw (1/1) 48'

Ricoh Arena
Attendance: 11,649
Referee: Ian Tempest

=== Round 5 ===
27 November 2015
19:45

Northampton Saints	15–3	Gloucester
Pen: Myler (5/6) 9', 14', 21', 63', 66'	Report	Pen: Twelvetrees (1/2) 24'

Franklin's Gardens
Attendance: 14,893
Referee: Greg Garner

28 November 2015
14:30

Sale Sharks	15–15	Newcastle Falcons
Pen: Cipriani (5/6) 2', 22', 33', 40', 50'	Report	Try: Vickers 24' m Welsh 70' c Con: Catterick (1/2); Pen: Delany (1/1) 11'

AJ Bell Stadium
Attendance: 5,220
Referee: Craig Maxwell-Keys

28 November 2015
15:00

Exeter Chiefs	26–25	Harlequins (2 BP)
Try: Short 39' c Steenson 55' c Con: Steenson (2/2); Pen: Steenson (4/4) 1', 10', 24', 32'	Report	Try: penalty try 7' c N. Evans 13' m Walker 29' m Visser 62' m Con: N. Evans (1/3); Pen: N. Evans (1/1) 42'

Sandy Park
Attendance: 11,471
Referee: Matthew Carley

28 November 2015
15:15

(1 BP) Saracens	48–18	Worcester Warriors
Try: Ashton (2) 3' c, 51' c Spencer 21' c Wray 43' c Brits 55' c Ransom 62' c Con: Hodgson (6/6); Pen: Hodgson (2/3) 30', 39'	Report	Try: Rees 70' m van Velze 79' c Con: Heathcote (1/2); Pen: Heathcote (2/3) 33', 37'

Twickenham Stadium
Attendance: 42,680
Referee: Ian Tempest

28 November 2015
17:30

London Irish	15–33	Wasps (1 BP)
Try: Williams (2) 40' m, 56' c Con: Noakes (1/2); Pen: Noakes (1/3) 7'	Report	Try: Halai (2) 37' m, 74' m Daly 49' c Young 70' c Con: Jackson (1/2); Gopperth (1/2); Pen: Jackson (2/4) 4', 18'; Gopperth (1/1) 54'

Twickenham Stadium
Attendance: 42,680
Referee: Wayne Barnes

29 November 2015
15:00

Leicester Tigers	21–11	Bath
Try: Veainu 33' m Cole 72' c Con: Bell (1/2); Pen: Bell (3/4) 14', 37', 65'	Report	Try: Watson 6' m Pen: Ford (2/2) 44', 50'

Welford Road
Attendance: 22,530
Referee: JP Doyle

=== Round 6 ===
4 December 2015
19:45

Gloucester	23–19	Sale Sharks (1 BP)
Try: Cook 2' m Kalamafoni (2) 54' m, 60' c Con: Laidlaw (1/2); Pen: Twelvetrees (2/2) 24', 27'	Report	Try: Edwards (2) 10' m, 48' m Pen: Cipriani (3/3) 16', 41', 69'

Kingsholm
Attendance: 11,583
Referee: JP Doyle

5 December 2015
15:00

(1 BP) Harlequins	38–7	London Irish
Try: Visser (3) 32' c, 57' c, 69' c Care 47' c Clifford 78' c Con: N. Evans (4/4); Botica (1/1); Pen: N. Evans (1/1) 6'	Report	Try: Aulika 79' c Con: Brophy-Clews (1/1)

Twickenham Stoop
Attendance: 14,800
Referee: Luke Pearce

5 December 2015
15:00

Worcester Warriors	20–29	Leicester Tigers (1 BP)
Try: Olivier 13' c Cox 21' c Con: Heathcote (2/2); Pen: Heathcote (2/3) 6', 61'	Report	Try: Kitchener 36' c Veainu 51' m penalty try 72' c McCaffrey 79' c Con: O. Williams (3/4); Pen: O. Williams (1/1) 68'

Sixways Stadium
Attendance: 10,157
Referee: Wayne Barnes

5 December 2015
15:15

(1 BP) Bath	11–13	Northampton Saints
Try: Rokoduguni 62' m Pen: Ford (2/3) 42', 50'	Report	Try: Burrell 46' c Con: Hanrahan (1/1); Pen: Hanrahan (2/2) 23', 72'

The Recreation Ground
Attendance: 13,506
Referee: Craig Maxwell-Keys

5 December 2015
17:30

Wasps	27–41	Exeter Chiefs (1 BP)
Try: Halai 39' c Johnson 43' c Cittadini 51' c Con: Gopperth (3/3); Pen: Gopperth (2/2) 20', 27'	Report	Try: Waldrom (3) 12' m, 34' m, 56' c Nowell 22' c Lees 30' c Low 71' c Con: Steenson (4/6); Pen: Steenson (1/1) 4'

Ricoh Arena
Attendance: 10,304
Referee: Greg Garner

6 December 2015
15:00

Newcastle Falcons	3–38	Saracens (1 BP)
Pen: Catterick (1/1) 24'	Report	Try: Vunisa 9' c Tompkins 61' c Hodgson 78' m B. Vunipola 80' c Con: Hodgson (2/3); Goode (1/1); Pen: Hodgson (4/4) 18', 40', 54', 73'

Kingston Park
Attendance: 6,020
Referee: Andrew Small

=== Round 7 ===
26 December 2015
14:30

London Irish	25–23	Northampton Saints (1 BP)
Try: Narraway 9' m Maitland 32' c penalty try 77' c Con: Noakes (1/2); Geraghty (1/1); Pen: Noakes (2/2) 28', 50'	Report	Try: K. Pisi 36' m North 45' m Fotuali'i 62' c Con: Myler (1/3); Pen: Myler (2/3) 25', 55'

Madejski Stadium
Attendance: 9,842
Referee: Ian Tempest

26 December 2015
15:00

(1 BP) Exeter Chiefs	33–17	Sale Sharks
Try: Waldrom 14' m Chudley (2) 19' m, 48' m Short 67' c Johnson 77' m Con: Steenson (1/5); Pen: Steenson (1/1) 54'; Hooley (1/1) 80'	Report	Try: Addison 24' c Beaumont 46' c Con: Cipriani (2/2); Pen: Cipriani (1/1) 9'

Sandy Park
Attendance: 12,425
Referee: Dean Richards

26 December 2015
15:00

Leicester Tigers	22–10	Newcastle Falcons
Try: Veainu 29' c Betham 42' c Pearce 73' m Con: Burns (2/3); Pen: Burns (1/1) 23'	Report	Try: Latu 14' c Con: Willis (1/1); Pen: Willis (1/1) 5'

Welford Road
Attendance: 21,564
Referee: Tim Wigglesworth

27 December 2015
14:00

Wasps	16–26	Saracens
Try: Halai 76' c Con: Gopperth (1/1); Pen: Gopperth (2/2) 31', 54'; Daly (1/2) 44'	Report	Try: Taylor 57' c Farrell 61' c Con: Farrell (2/2); Pen: Farrell (4/5) 1', 8', 46', 71'

Ricoh Arena
Attendance: 24,053
Referee: JP Doyle

27 December 2015
14:30

Bath	21–14	Worcester Warriors (1 BP)
Try: Devoto 9' c Agulla 40' m Con: Priestland (1/2); Pen: Priestland (3/4) 18', 43', 68'	Report	Try: Vuna 31' m Pen: Heathcote (2/3) 12', 45'; Mills (1/1) 20'

The Recreation Ground
Attendance: 13,499
Referee: Thomas Foley

27 December 2015
16:30

(1 BP) Harlequins	39–39	Gloucester (1 BP)
Try: Yarde 15' m Care 34' c Easter 52' c R. Chisholm (2) 54' c, 76' c Con: N. Evans (4/5); Pen: N. Evans (2/2) 12', 70'	Report	Try: Thrush 6' c Hook 30' c Trinder (2) 47' c, 56' m Cook 68' c Con: Laidlaw (4/5); Pen: Laidlaw (2/3) 20', 60'

Twickenham Stadium
Attendance: 70,718
Referee: Wayne Barnes

=== Round 8 ===
1 January 2016
15:00

Northampton Saints	8–3	Exeter Chiefs (1 BP)
Try: Haywood 17' m Pen: Hanrahan (1/2) 31'	Report	Pen: Steenson (1/1) 73'

Franklin's Gardens
Attendance: 15,430
Referee: JP Doyle

2 January 2016
15:00

Gloucester	27–14	London Irish
Try: Kvesic 66' c Burns 70' m Con: Hook (1/2); Pen: Hook (5/5) 2', 12', 42', 50', 59'	Report	Try: Hearn 6' c Lewington 31' c Con: Noakes (2/2)

Kingsholm
Attendance: 16,115
Referee: Thomas Foley

2 January 2016
15:00

Newcastle Falcons	19–14	Bath (1 BP)
Try: Vickers 20' c Con: Willis (1/1); Pen: Willis (4/7) 12', 36', 69', 80'	Report	Try: Garvey 5' m Pen: Priestland (3/4) 27', 45', 57'

Kingston Park
Attendance: 7,075
Referee: Matthew Carley

2 January 2016
15:15

(1 BP) Saracens	26–6	Leicester Tigers
Try: penalty try (3) 11' c, 54' c, 66' c George 42' m Con: Hodgson (2/3); Farrell (1/1)	Report	Pen: Burns (2/2) 5', 22'

Allianz Park
Attendance: 10,000
Referee: Greg Garner

2 January 2016
17:30

Sale Sharks	15–9	Wasps (1 BP)
Pen: Cipriani (4/4) 5', 56', 64', 74'; Drop: Cipriani (1/2) 77'	Report	Pen: Gopperth (2/2) 31', 70'; Drop: Daly (1/1) 40'

AJ Bell Stadium
Attendance: 7,619
Referee: Luke Pearce

3 January 2016
15:00

(1 BP) Worcester Warriors	20–24	Harlequins
Try: Mama 48' m penalty try 60' c Dowson 69' m Con: Mills (1/3); Pen: Heathcote (1/2) 15'	Report	Try: Walker (2) 2' c, 43' c Wallace 27' c Con: N. Evans (3/3); Pen: N. Evans (1/1) 33'

Sixways Stadium
Attendance: 9,035
Referee: Andrew Small

=== Round 9 ===
8 January 2016
19:45

Bath	P–P (Note: Due to the terrorist attacks that took place in Paris on 13 November 2015, matches in the European Rugby Champions Cup and European Rugby Challenge Cup were postponed to a later date – later announced to take place on the weekend of 8–10 January 2016. This meant the fixtures that featured those teams in their respective domestic leagues, were postponed to a later date.)	Sale Sharks

The Recreation Ground

9 January 2016
15:00

Exeter Chiefs	19–10	Gloucester
Try: Waldrom (2) 5' c, 9' m Woodburn 22' c Con: Steenson (2/3)	Report	Try: Sharples 68' c Con: Burns (1/1); Pen: Laidlaw (1/1) 45'

Sandy Park
Attendance: 12,600
Referee: Ian Tempest

9 January 2016
15:00

Harlequins	29–23	Saracens (1 BP)
Try: Buchanan 21' m Clifford 39' c Horwill 79' m Con: N. Evans (1/2); Pen: N. Evans (1/1) 32'; Botica (3/3) 61', 67', 73'	Report	Try: de Kock 9' c B. Vunipola 26' c Con: Farrell (2/2); Pen: Farrell (3/4) 44', 52', 64'

Twickenham Stoop
Attendance: 14,800
Referee: Craig Maxwell-Keys

9 January 2016
15:15

Leicester Tigers	30–27	Northampton Saints (1 BP)
Try: Smith 1' c McCaffrey 19' c O. Williams 22' c Con: O. Williams (3/3); Pen: Burns (3/3) 53', 57', 80'	Report	Try: Harrison 37' c North 43' c Gibson 65' c Con: Hanrahan (2/2); Myler (1/1); Pen: Hanrahan (1/2) 29'; Myler (1/1) 75'

Welford Road
Attendance: 25,849
Referee: Wayne Barnes

10 January 2016
13:00

London Irish	20–15	Newcastle Falcons (1 BP)
Try: Lewington 41' c Ojo 44' c Con: Geraghty (2/2); Pen: Noakes (2/3) 7', 26'	Report	Try: Latu 54' m Watson 66' c Con: Goode (1/1); Pen: Goode (1/1) 60'

Madejski Stadium
Attendance: 5,558
Referee: JP Doyle

10 January 2016
14:00

(1 BP) Wasps	32–22	Worcester Warriors
Try: Myall 48' c Thompson 68' c Halai 78' m Tagicakibau 80' c Con: Gopperth (3/4); Pen: Gopperth (2/2) 36', 43'	Report	Try: Vuna 31' c Con: Symons (1/1); Pen: Symons (5/5) 10', 26', 54', 62', 65'

Ricoh Arena
Attendance: 13,040
Referee: Matthew Carley

=== Round 10 ===
29 January 2016
19:45

Northampton Saints	11–24	Wasps
Try: Dickinson 72' m Pen: Myler (2/2) 27', 42'	Report	Try: Robson 15' c Miller 24' c Bassett 28' c Con: Gopperth (3/3); Pen: Gopperth (1/2) 4'

Franklin's Gardens
Attendance: 14,889
Referee: Thomas Foley

30 January 2016
14:30

(1 BP) Sale Sharks	38–10	London Irish
Try: Mujati 4' m Ioane 19' c James 41' c Edwards (2) 54' c, 60' m Tuitupou 68' c Con: Cipriani (3/5); Ford (1/1)	Report	Try: penalty try 37' c Con: Geraghty (1/1); Pen: Geraghty (1/2) 2'

AJ Bell Stadium
Attendance: 6,461
Referee: Greg Garner

30 January 2016
15:00

(1 BP) Gloucester	18–19	Leicester Tigers
Try: Hook 21' c Morgan 22' m Con: Hook (1/2); Pen: Hook (2/2) 36', 72'	Report	Try: Ayerza 29' c Veainu 68' m Mulipola 78' c Con: Burns (1/2); Bell (1/1)

Kingsholm
Attendance: 16,115
Referee: JP Doyle

30 January 2016
15:15

Saracens	19–13	Bath (1 BP)
Try: Brits 70' c Con: Hodgson (1/1); Pen: Hodgson (4/5) 45', 48', 73', 77'	Report	Try: T. Homer 12' c Con: Priestland (1/1); Pen: Priestland (2/4) 4', 40'

Allianz Park
Attendance: 10,000
Referee: Dean Richards

31 January 2016
15:00

Newcastle Falcons	26–19	Harlequins (1 BP)
Try: Lawson 10' c Vickers 77' c Con: Willis (1/1); Goode (1/1); Pen: Willis (1/1) 19'; Goode (3/3) 59', 61', 68'	Report	Try: Walker (2) 38' c, 45' c Ward 43' m Con: N. Evans (2/3)

Kingston Park
Attendance: 6,539
Referee: Luke Pearce

31 January 2016
15:00

Worcester Warriors	15–30	Exeter Chiefs (1 BP)
Pen: Heathcote (5/6) 10', 21', 30', 37', 45'	Report	Try: Short 2' m Whitten 28' c Waldrom 58' c Armand 68' m Con: Steenson (2/4); Pen: Steenson (2/2) 42', 74'

Sixways Stadium
Attendance: 8,215
Referee: Craig Maxwell-Keys

=== Round 11 ===
5 February 2016
19:45

(1 BP) Bath	11–15	Gloucester
Try: Day 11' m Pen: T. Homer (2/2) 19', 47'	Report	Pen: Hook (5/8) 27', 44', 51', 55', 64'

The Recreation Ground
Attendance: 13,104
Referee: Matthew Carley

6 February 2016
14:00

(1 BP) Harlequins	23–27	Northampton Saints
Try: Merrick 7' c R. Chisholm 23' c Con: N. Evans (2/2); Pen: N. Evans (2/2) 43', 49'; Botica (1/1) 73'	Report	Try: Day 12' c Burrell 30' c Foden 80' c Con: Myler (2/2); Hanrahan (1/1); Pen: Myler (1/2) 4'; Hanrahan (1/1) 71'

Twickenham Stoop
Attendance: 14,800
Referee: Greg Garner

6 February 2016
14:00

Wasps	9–8	Newcastle Falcons (1 BP)
Pen: Gopperth (3/4) 22', 53', 75'	Report	Try: Latu 47' m Pen: Goode (1/3) 25'

Ricoh Arena
Attendance: 12,392
Referee: Craig Maxwell-Keys

6 February 2016
15:00

(1 BP) Leicester Tigers	3–10	Sale Sharks
Pen: Burns (1/3) 31'	Report	Try: Beaumont 61' c Con: Cipriani (1/1); Pen: Cipriani (1/6) 11'

Welford Road
Attendance: 22,737
Referee: Tim Wigglesworth

7 February 2016
13:00

(1 BP) Exeter Chiefs	11–14	Saracens
Try: Short 12' m Pen: Steenson (2/2) 3', 29'	Report	Try: Vunisa 38' m Pen: Hodgson (3/3) 52', 66', 74'

Sandy Park
Attendance: 12,450
Referee: Thomas Foley

7 February 2016
13:00

London Irish	20–13	Worcester Warriors (1 BP)
Try: Hearn 16' c Fenby 54' c Con: Geraghty (2/2); Pen: Geraghty (2/3) 32', 73'	Report	Try: Heem 46' m Rapava-Ruskin 69' m Pen: Mills (1/1) 22'

Madejski Stadium
Attendance: 5,837
Referee: Wayne Barnes

=== Round 12 ===
12 February 2016
19:45

Newcastle Falcons	26–14	Leicester Tigers
Try: Hammersley 15' c Powell 35' c Con: Goode (2/2); Pen: Goode (3/5) 26', 30', 50'; Willis (1/1) 80'	Report	Try: Pearce 64' m Pen: Burns (3/3) 2', 14', 21'

Kingston Park
Attendance: 6,207
Referee: Greg Garner

13 February 2016
14:30

Sale Sharks	23–17	Exeter Chiefs (1 BP)
Try: Leota 15' m Edwards 23' m Haley 38' c Con: Cipriani (1/3); Pen: Cipriani (2/4) 49', 71'	Report	Try: Yeandle 46' c Lewis 67' c Con: Steenson (2/2); Pen: Steenson (1/2) 79'

AJ Bell Stadium
Attendance: 4,236
Referee: Andrew Small

13 February 2016
15:00

Gloucester	28–6	Harlequins
Try: Hook 2' c Morgan 28' c McColl 76' m Con: Hook (2/3); Pen: Hook (3/5) 14', 17', 37'	Report	Pen: N. Evans (2/2) 9', 20'

Kingsholm
Attendance: 12,782
Referee: Wayne Barnes

13 February 2016
15:00

(1 BP) Northampton Saints	35–7	London Irish
Try: Craig 17' c penalty try 22' c A. Waller 37' c Elliott 45' c Dickson 47' c Con: Myler (5/5)	Report	Try: Paice 77' c Con: Geraghty (1/1)

Franklin's Gardens
Attendance: 15,227
Referee: Tim Wigglesworth

13 February 2016
15:00

(1 BP) Worcester Warriors	14–16	Bath
Try: Vuna 13' c O'Callaghan 24' c Con: Heathcote (2/2)	Report	Try: Evans 50' c Con: T. Homer (1/1); Pen: T. Homer (3/4) 6', 29', 67'

Sixways Stadium
Attendance: 8,618
Referee: JP Doyle

14 February 2016
16:00

Saracens	23–64	Wasps (1 BP)
Try: Vunisa 23' c Hamilton 54' c Con: Hodgson (2/2); Pen: Hodgson (3/3) 11', 30', 40'	Report	Try: C. Piutau (2) 2' m, 51' c Young 4' c Robson (2) 7' c, 67' c Hughes (2) 27' m, 31' c Gopperth 42' c Con: Gopperth (6/8); Pen: Gopperth (2/2) 47', 52'; Daly (1/1) 75'; Lozowski (1/1) 77'

Allianz Park
Attendance: 8,742
Referee: Ian Tempest

=== Round 13 ===
19 February 2016
19:45

Harlequins	25–19	Leicester Tigers (1 BP)
Try: Yarde 74' c Con: Botica (1/1); Pen: Botica (6/7) 8', 24', 30', 45', 52', 66'	Report	Try: Thacker 55' c Con: Burns (1/1); Pen: Bryant (3/3) 6', 22', 27'; Burns (1/2) 77'

Twickenham Stoop
Attendance: 14,800
Referee: JP Doyle

20 February 2016
15:00

Saracens	25–12	Gloucester
Try: Ransom 2' c Con: Hodgson (1/1); Pen: Hodgson (6/7) 26', 33', 54', 62', 70', 76'	Report	Pen: Hook (4/4) 23', 30', 42', 56'

Allianz Park
Attendance: 8,432
Referee: Craig Maxwell-Keys

20 February 2016
15:00

Worcester Warriors	31–23	Sale Sharks (1 BP)
Try: Kirwan 8' m Hougaard 27' c Pennell 44' c Con: Heathcote (2/3); Pen: Heathcote (4/4) 3', 34', 40', 51'	Report	Try: Seymour 36' m Taylor 42' m Haley (2) 60' m, 78' m Pen: Cipriani (1/1) 15'

Sixways Stadium
Attendance: 7,156
Referee: Greg Garner

20 February 2016
15:15

(1 BP) Bath	18–24	Wasps
Try: T. Homer 65' c Mafi 80' m Con: T. Homer (1/2); Pen: Priestland (2/2) 33', 40'	Report	Try: Halai (2) 28' m, 47' m McIntyre 61' m Pen: Daly (1/2) 5'; Jackson (1/2) 42'; Gopperth (1/1) 69'

The Recreation Ground
Attendance: 13,322
Referee: Thomas Foley

21 February 2016
15:00

(1 BP) London Irish	15–22	Exeter Chiefs
Try: Treviranus 10' c Ojo 62' m Con: Brophy-Clews (1/2); Pen: Brophy-Clews (1/1) 44'	Report	Try: Lewis 49' c Con: Steenson (1/1); Pen: Steenson (5/5) 20', 40', 47', 59', 74'

Madejski Stadium
Attendance: 5,892
Referee: Dean Richards

21 February 2016
15:00

Newcastle Falcons	26–25	Northampton Saints (1 BP)
Try: Tait 6' c Harris 29' c Con: Goode (2/2); Pen: Goode (4/4) 21', 39', 46', 49'	Report	Try: Gibson 12' m Dickson (2) 52' c, 67' c Con: Hanrahan (2/2); Pen: Myler (2/2) 18', 26'

Kingston Park
Attendance: 7,218
Referee: Wayne Barnes

=== Round 14 ===
27 February 2016
13:00

(1 BP) Sale Sharks	36–36	Saracens (1 BP)
Try: James 7' c Leota 10' m Arscott (2) 15' m, 79' m Ioane 70' m Con: Cipriani (1/5); Pen: Cipriani (3/3) 48', 53', 58'	Report	Try: Hamilton 20' c Wyles (2) 30' m, 38' c Tompkins 60' c Ellery 66' c Con: Hodgson (1/2); Spencer (3/3); Pen: Hodgson (1/2) 24'

AJ Bell Stadium
Attendance: 5,824
Referee: Tim Wigglesworth

27 February 2016
14:45

(1 BP) Northampton Saints	38–18	Worcester Warriors
Try: Mallinder 30' m Collins (3) 36' c, 41' m, 65' c Dickson 57' c G. Pisi 77' c Con: Myler (3/5); Hanrahan (1/1)	Report	Try: Rapava-Ruskin 28' m Olivier 39' c Con: Heathcote (1/2); Pen: Heathcote (2/2) 10', 52'

Franklin's Gardens
Attendance: 14,246
Referee: Matthew Carley

27 February 2016
15:00

(1 BP) Gloucester	32–6	Newcastle Falcons
Try: Meakes 8' c Hook 20' c Moriarty 33' m Savage 73' c Con: Hook (2/3); Twelvetrees (1/1); Pen: Hook (2/4) 3', 26'	Report	Pen: Willis (2/2) 31', 40'

Kingsholm
Attendance: 11,095
Referee: Dean Richards

28 February 2016
13:00

Exeter Chiefs	26–17	Bath
Try: Whitten 34' c Horstmann 76' c Con: Steenson (2/2); Pen: Steenson (4/6) 11', 17', 27', 64'	Report	Try: Mafi (2) 39' c, 41' c Con: T. Homer (2/2); Pen: T. Homer (1/1) 71'

Sandy Park
Attendance: 12,612
Referee: Greg Garner

28 February 2016
15:00

(1 BP) Leicester Tigers	47–20	London Irish
Try: Thompstone (2) 3' m, 69' c Thacker 15' c McCaffrey 30' c Kitto 39' c Croft 51' c de Villiers 66' c Con: Burns (5/6); Bell (1/1)	Report	Try: Paice 57' m Trayfoot 72' c Fenby 80' m Con: Geraghty (1/3); Pen: Brophy-Clews (1/1) 10'

Welford Road
Attendance: 23,173
Referee: Ian Tempest

28 February 2016
15:15

(1 BP) Wasps	42–10	Harlequins
Try: Cooper-Woolley 22' c Wade 28' c Hughes 34' c Young 61' c S. Piutau 66' c Macken 80' c Con: Gopperth (5/5); Lozowski (1/1)	Report	Try: Wallace 31' m Walker 55' m

Ricoh Arena
Attendance: 14,638
Referee: Craig Maxwell-Keys

=== Round 15 ===
4 March 2016
19:45

(1 BP) Newcastle Falcons	14–15	Worcester Warriors
Try: Vickers 72' m Pen: Goode (3/4) 15', 31', 53'	Report	Try: Potgieter 38' c Heem 60' m Con: Heathcote (1/2); Pen: Heathcote (1/2) 46'

Kingston Park
Attendance: 6,353
Referee: Wayne Barnes

5 March 2016
14:30

Sale Sharks	29–23	Harlequins (1 BP)
Try: Ioane 47' c Addison 61' c Con: Ford (1/1); Cipriani (1/1); Pen: Ford (3/3) 3', 13', 26'; Cipriani (2/2) 59', 67'	Report	Try: Visser 35' c Egerton 78' c Con: Botica (2/2); Pen: Botica (3/3) 8', 33', 51'

AJ Bell Stadium
Attendance: 7,562
Referee: Ian Tempest

5 March 2016
15:00

Gloucester	13–10	Wasps (1 BP)
Try: Hibbard 17' c Con: Laidlaw (1/1); Pen: Laidlaw (2/4) 3', 56'	Report	Try: Wade 42' c Con: Gopperth (1/1); Pen: Gopperth (1/1) 20'

Kingsholm
Attendance: 13,766
Referee: Luke Pearce

5 March 2016
15:15

(1 BP) Bath	25–17	London Irish
Try: Banahan (2) 11' m, 23' c Rokoduguni 37' m Houston 60' m Con: Priestland (1/4); Pen: Priestland (1/1) 7'	Report	Try: Lewington 80' m Pen: Brophy-Clews (3/4) 10', 20', 28'; Tonks (1/1) 79'

The Recreation Ground
Attendance: 13,500
Referee: JP Doyle

5 March 2016
15:15

(1 BP) Saracens	15–20	Northampton Saints
Pen: Spencer (3/3) 16', 29', 52'; Goode (2/2) 37', 71'	Report	Try: Myler 34' c Dickson 42' c Con: Myler (2/2); Pen: Myler (2/2) 63', 76'

Allianz Park
Attendance: 9,877
Referee: Thomas Foley

6 March 2016
15:00

(1 BP) Leicester Tigers	31–27	Exeter Chiefs (1 BP)
Try: penalty try 29' c Tuilagi 31' c Betham 45' c Thompstone 48' c Con: Burns (4/4); Pen: Burns (1/1) 15'	Report	Try: Lewis 56' c Whitten 59' c Horstmann 80' c Con: Steenson (3/3); Pen: Steenson (2/2) 17', 40'

Welford Road
Attendance: 20,173
Referee: Matthew Carley

=== Round 16 ===
11 March 2016
19:45

(1 BP) Harlequins	35–28	Bath (1 BP)
Try: Sloan 3' m Walker (2) 39' c, 41' c Horwill 44' c Con: Botica (3/4); Pen: Botica (3/3) 2', 12', 35'	Report	Try: Mafi 65' m Williams 69' c Rokoduguni 72' c Con: T. Homer (2/3); Pen: T. Homer (3/3) 10', 14', 80'

Twickenham Stoop
Attendance: 14,800
Referee: Dean Richards

12 March 2016
13:45

(1 BP) Wasps	36–24	Leicester Tigers
Try: C. Piutau (2) 8' m, 28' c Wade 24' c Halai 41' c Hughes 62' c Con: Gopperth (3/4); Lozowski (1/1); Pen: Gopperth (1/2) 2'	Report	Try: Betham 22' c Veainu 47' c Goneva 76' c Con: Burns (3/3); Pen: Burns (1/1) 20'

Ricoh Arena
Attendance: 22,241
Referee: Greg Garner

12 March 2016
14:00

(1 BP) Northampton Saints	26–11	Sale Sharks
Try: Haywood 37' c K. Pisi 45' c Collins 48' c Hanrahan 77' m Con: Myler (3/3)	Report	Try: Evans 19' m Pen: Cipriani (1/2) 23'; Arscott (1/1) 27'

Franklin's Gardens
Attendance: 14,337
Referee: JP Doyle

12 March 2016
14:00

Worcester Warriors	28–20	Gloucester
Try: Heem (2) 1' c, 36' m Hougaard 52' c Con: Heathcote (2/3); Pen: Heathcote (3/4) 25', 61', 70'	Report	Try: Meakes 17' c Hook 65' c Con: Hook (2/2); Pen: Hook (2/3) 29', 55'

Sixways Stadium
Attendance: 10,124
Referee: Ian Tempest

12 March 2016
15:00

(1 BP) Exeter Chiefs	32–17	Newcastle Falcons
Try: Waldrom 44' c Dollman 52' c S. Hill 73' m Taione 78' c Con: Steenson (3/4); Pen: Steenson (2/2) 8', 69'	Report	Try: Takulua 48' c Latu 57' c Con: Delany (2/2); Pen: Delany (1/2) 29'

Sandy Park
Attendance: 9,170
Referee: Craig Maxwell-Keys

12 March 2016
15:00 (Note: Kick off time local to New Jersey; 20:00 GMT in England.)

London Irish	16–26	Saracens
Try: Lewington 18' c Con: Tonks (1/1); Pen: Tonks (3/4) 8', 24', 58'	Report	Try: Goode 15' c Tompkins 78' c Con: Spencer (1/1); Goode (1/1); Pen: Goode (4/4) 45', 48', 54', 68'

Red Bull Arena
Attendance: 14,811
Referee: Luke Pearce

=== Round 17 ===
18 March 2016
19:45

Bath	21–19	Newcastle Falcons (1 BP)
Try: Rokoduguni (2) 30' c, 37' m Con: T. Homer (1/2); Pen: T. Homer (3/4) 54', 68', 72'	Report	Try: Vickers 12' c Con: Delany (1/1); Pen: Delany (4/6) 48', 57', 60', 65'

The Recreation Ground
Attendance: 12,811
Referee: Tim Wigglesworth

19 March 2016
15:00

(1 BP) Harlequins	15–21	Worcester Warriors
Pen: Botica (5/6) 3', 13', 36', 66', 73'	Report	Try: Olivier 19' m van Velze 28' c Con: Heathcote (1/2); Pen: Heathcote (3/4) 7', 12', 71'

Twickenham Stoop
Attendance: 12,955
Referee: Craig Maxwell-Keys

20 March 2016
13:00

Exeter Chiefs	20–12	Northampton Saints
Try: Woodburn 51' m Pen: Steenson (5/5) 11', 56', 68', 73', 78'	Report	Try: Dickson 13' m K. Pisi 33' c Con: Hanrahan (1/2)

Sandy Park
Attendance: 9,822
Referee: Greg Garner

20 March 2016
14:00

(1 BP) Wasps	39–12	Sale Sharks
Try: C. Piutau 1' c Miller 6' m Johnson 40' c Gopperth 57' c Wade 69' c Con: Gopperth (3/4); Jackson (1/1); Pen: Gopperth (2/2) 21', 31'	Report	Try: Seymour 45' c Briggs 52' m Con: Cipriani (1/2)

Ricoh Arena
Attendance: 12,823
Referee: Dean Richards

20 March 2016
15:00

London Irish	23–18	Gloucester (1 BP)
Try: Aulika 8' c Cowan 69' c Con: Tonks (2/2); Pen: Tonks (3/4) 16', 50', 75'	Report	Try: Ludlow 37' c Trinder 55' m Con: Hook (1/2); Pen: Hook (2/3) 12', 53'

Madejski Stadium
Attendance: 17,752
Referee: Matthew Carley

20 March 2016
15:15

Leicester Tigers	21–13	Saracens
Try: Burns 45' c Goneva 51' m Con: Burns (1/2); Pen: Burns (2/2) 15', 31'; Drop: Burns (1/1) 75'	Report	Try: Goode 64' c Con: Goode (1/1); Pen: Goode (2/3) 12', 70'

Welford Road
Attendance: 22,282
Referee: JP Doyle

=== Round 18 ===
26 March 2016
15:15

(1 BP) Saracens	36–18	Exeter Chiefs
Try: Goode 17' c B. Vunipola 32' m Farrell 52' c Wray 66' c Wyles 74' c Con: Farrell (3/4); Goode (1/1); Pen: Farrell (1/2) 70'	Report	Try: Waldrom (2) 58' m, 80' c Con: Hooley (1/1); Pen: Steenson (2/2) 39', 40'

Allianz Park
Attendance: 9,749
Referee: Matthew Carley

26 March 2016
17:30

(1 BP) Gloucester	12–17	Bath
Pen: Laidlaw (4/4) 3', 8', 16', 55'	Report	Try: Cook 13' c Rokoduguni (2) 43' m, 75' m Con: Ford (1/3)

Kingsholm
Attendance: 16,115
Referee: Wayne Barnes

26 March 2016
17:30

Worcester Warriors	12–6	London Irish (1 BP)
Pen: Heathcote (4/4) 27', 29', 54', 75'	Report	Pen: Tonks (2/2) 69', 77'

Sixways Stadium
Attendance: 9,234
Referee: Greg Garner

27 March 2016
13:00

Sale Sharks	27–20	Leicester Tigers (1 BP)
Try: Neild 21' c Edwards 29' c Cipriani 69' c Con: Cipriani (3/3); Pen: Cipriani (2/2) 2', 43'	Report	Try: Bell 38' c Goneva 61' c Con: O. Williams (2/2); Pen: Burns (1/1) 12'; O. Williams (1/1) 24'

AJ Bell Stadium
Attendance: 7,687
Referee: Thomas Foley

27 March 2016
15:00

Newcastle Falcons	20–34	Wasps (1 BP)
Try: Vea 40' c McGuigan 65' c Con: Delany (2/2); Pen: Delany (2/2) 14', 49'	Report	Try: Smith 26' c Robson (2) 29' m, 54' m Young (2) 56' c, 78' c Con: Gopperth (3/5); Pen: Gopperth (1/1) 22'

Kingston Park
Attendance: 6,725
Referee: JP Doyle

27 March 2016
15:15

(1 BP) Northampton Saints	29–23	Harlequins (1 BP)
Try: A. Waller 12' m Lawes 23' c Foden 54' c Mallinder 73' c Con: Myler (3/4); Pen: Myler (1/2) 46'	Report	Try: Visser 32' c Clifford 41' c Con: Botica (2/2); Pen: Botica (3/5) 8', 18', 79'

Franklin's Gardens
Attendance: 15,249
Referee: Tim Wigglesworth

=== Round 19 ===
1 April 2016
19:45

Bath	10–30	Saracens (1 BP)
Try: Houston 62' c Con: Ford (1/1); Pen: Ford (1/1) 40'	Report	Try: Fraser 5' c Ellery 31' m Ashton (2) 54' m, 69' c Con: Farrell (2/4); Pen: Farrell (2/3) 11', 27'

The Recreation Ground
Attendance: 13,518
Referee: Greg Garner

2 April 2016
15:00

(1 BP) Exeter Chiefs	50–12	Worcester Warriors
Try: Waldrom (3) 18' m, 58' m, 71' c Short 23' c Woodburn (3) 24' m, 62' c, 77' c Atkins 41' c Con: Steenson (2/5); Slade (3/3)	Report	Try: Vuna 34' m Symons 38' c Con: Heathcote (1/2)

Sandy Park
Attendance: 11,168
Referee: Thomas Foley

2 April 2016
15:00

(1 BP) Harlequins	46–25	Newcastle Falcons
Try: Visser (2) 5' c, 72' m Clifford 13' c Gray 36' c Marchant 47' c Yarde 80' c Con: Botica (5/6); Pen: Botica (2/2) 63', 66'	Report	Try: Watson 49' m Latu (2) 56' c, 60' c Con: Delany (2/3); Pen: Delany (2/2) 4', 8'

Twickenham Stoop
Attendance: 14,267
Referee: Matthew Carley

2 April 2016
15:00

London Irish	15–30	Sale Sharks
Try: Maitland 15' m Williams 64' c Con: Tonks (1/2); Pen: Tonks (1/3) 8'	Report	Try: Haley 36' c Ioane 71' c Cipriani 76' c Con: Cipriani (3/3); Pen: Cipriani (3/4) 6', 25', 62'

Madejski Stadium
Attendance: 5,541
Referee: Craig Maxwell-Keys

2 April 2016
15:15

(1 BP) Leicester Tigers	35–30	Gloucester (1 BP)
Try: Veainu 7' m Tuilagi (2) 11' m, 46' c Betham 66' m Goneva 73' c Con: O. Williams (2/5); Pen: O. Williams (2/2) 40', 54'	Report	Try: McColl 27' c Trinder 30' c McAllister 36' c Con: Laidlaw (3/3); Pen: Laidlaw (3/3) 3', 18', 65'

Welford Road
Attendance: 22,223
Referee: JP Doyle

3 April 2016
15:00

Wasps	28–6	Northampton Saints
Try: Miller (2) 21' c, 66' c Stevenson 78' m Con: Gopperth (2/3); Pen: Gopperth (1/2) 17'; Daly (2/3) 48', 75'	Report	Pen: Myler (2/2) 2', 51'

Ricoh Arena
Attendance: 17,422
Referee: Luke Pearce

=== Round 20 ===
15 April 2016
19:45

Gloucester	16–9	Exeter Chiefs (1 BP)
Try: Thorley 44' c Con: Laidlaw (1/1); Pen: Laidlaw (3/3) 61', 68', 71'	Report	Pen: Steenson (3/3) 41', 47', 64'

Kingsholm
Attendance: 13,390
Referee: Craig Maxwell-Keys

16 April 2016
15:00

(1 BP) Worcester Warriors	35–54	Wasps (1 BP)
Try: Hougaard 20' c Vuna 33' m Symons 45' m van Velze 58' m Heem 66' m Kirwan 75' m Con: Heathcote (1/5); Pen: Mills (1/1) 1'	Report	Try: Halai 7' c Wade (6) 15' c, 24' c, 29' m, 36' c, 48' c, 54' c Lozowski 71' c Con: Daly (3/4); Jackson (3/3); Lozowski (1/1)

Sixways Stadium
Attendance: 10,727
Referee: JP Doyle

16 April 2016
15:15

Saracens	22–12	Harlequins
Try: Ashton (2) 12' m, 38' c Kruis 29' c Con: Hodgson (2/3); Pen: Farrell (1/1) 74'	Report	Pen: Botica (4/5) 4', 16', 33', 46'

Wembley Stadium
Attendance: 80,650
Referee: Greg Garner

16 April 2016
17:30

(1 BP) Northampton Saints	24–30	Leicester Tigers
Try: Harrison 23' c G. Pisi 53' m Con: Myler (1/2); Pen: Myler (3/3) 19', 40', 61'; Hanrahan (1/1) 76'	Report	Try: Thacker 12' c Goneva 26' c Burns 63' c Con: Burns (3/3); Pen: Burns (3/3) 10', 45', 58'

Franklin's Gardens
Attendance: 15,241
Referee: Tim Wigglesworth

17 April 2016
14:30

(1 BP) Sale Sharks	29–17	Bath
Try: Cobîlaș 9' c Addison 19' c Seymour 72' m Easter 78' c Con: Cipriani (3/4); Pen: Cipriani (1/3) 37'	Report	Try: Rokoduguni 50' m Pen: Ford (4/6) 14', 34', 40', 56'

AJ Bell Stadium
Attendance: 6,278
Referee: Luke Pearce

17 April 2016
15:00

Newcastle Falcons	13–6	London Irish (1 BP)
Try: Watson 24' c Con: Delany (1/1); Pen: Delany (1/2) 11'; Socino (1/1) 43'	Report	Pen: Tonks (2/2) 8', 18'

Kingston Park
Attendance: 7,756
Referee: Wayne Barnes

=== Round 9 rescheduled match ===
23 April 2016
15:15

(1 BP) Bath	32–26	Sale Sharks (2 BP)
Try: Devoto 1' c Ewels 11' c Rokoduguni 57' m W. Homer 71' c Con: Ford (3/4); Pen: Ford (2/2) 15', 53'	Report	Try: Leota (2) 42' c, 80' c Ostrikov 47' c Ioane 77' m Con: Cipriani (2/2); Ford (1/2)

The Recreation Ground
Attendance: 12,684
Referee: Ian Tempest

This match – originally scheduled to be held during Round 9, on 8 January 2016 – was postponed due to a European Rugby Champions Cup fixture rearrangement that occurred as a result of the Paris terrorist attacks in November 2015. It was further rescheduled from 13 April 2016, after Sale Sharks were eliminated from the European Rugby Challenge Cup.

=== Round 21 ===
29 April 2016
19:45

(1 BP) Sale Sharks	11–12	Gloucester
Try: Leota 54' m Pen: Cipriani (2/2) 16', 40'	Report	Pen: Laidlaw (4/4) 1', 30', 69', 76'

AJ Bell Stadium
Attendance: 7,352
Referee: Thomas Foley

30 April 2016
15:00

(1 BP) Leicester Tigers	31–17	Worcester Warriors
Try: Goneva 13' c Fonua 25' c Veainu 38' c Evans 62' c Con: O. Williams (4/4); Pen: O. Williams (1/1) 69'	Report	Try: Heem 16' c Symons 36' c Con: Heathcote (2/2); Pen: Mills (1/1) 8'

Welford Road
Attendance: 21,682
Referee: Greg Garner

30 April 2016
15:15

Northampton Saints	15–14	Bath (1 BP)
Try: Harrison 56' m Haywood 72' c Con: Myler (1/2); Pen: Myler (1/1) 61'	Report	Try: Williams (2) 10' c, 19' c Con: Priestland (2/2)

Franklin's Gardens
Attendance: 15,249
Referee: Wayne Barnes

1 May 2016
13:00

Exeter Chiefs	24–3	Wasps
Try: Woodburn 26' c Dollman 57' c Nowell 70' c Con: Steenson (3/3); Pen: Steenson (1/2) 43'	Report	Pen: Daly (1/1) 33'

Sandy Park
Attendance: 12,407
Referee: Matthew Carley

1 May 2016
15:00

(1 BP) London Irish	25–32	Harlequins (1 BP)
Try: Narraway 30' m Tikoirotuma 36' c Paice 56' c Con: Brophy-Clews (2/3); Pen: Brophy-Clews (2/2) 13', 65'	Report	Try: Walker (2) 10' c, 19' c R. Chisholm 21' m Sinckler 69' c Con: Botica (2/3); N. Evans (1/1); Pen: Botica (1/1) 40'; N. Evans (1/1) 67'

Madejski Stadium
Attendance: 9,016
Referee: JP Doyle

1 May 2016
15:15

Saracens	23–14	Newcastle Falcons
Try: Wray (2) 46' m, 52' c Itoje 68' m Con: Hodgson (1/3); Pen: Hodgson (2/4) 17', 57'	Report	Try: Watson (2) 20' c, 38' c Con: Willis (2/2)

Allianz Park
Attendance: 9,744
Referee: Ian Tempest

=== Round 22 ===
7 May 2016
15:30

(1 BP) Bath	38–27	Leicester Tigers (1 BP)
Try: Rokoduguni (2) 2' c, 54' c Devoto 41' c Louw 51' c Williams 78' c Con: Ford (5/5); Pen: Ford (1/1) 19'	Report	Try: Balmain 15' c Betham 26' c Tait 35' m Evans 65' m Con: O. Williams (2/4); Pen: O. Williams (1/1) 47'

The Recreation Ground
Attendance: 13,515
Referee: Craig Maxwell-Keys

7 May 2016
15:30

Gloucester	20–28	Northampton Saints
Try: L. Evans 32' c Moriarty 37' c Con: Laidlaw (2/2); Pen: Laidlaw (2/3) 1', 23'	Report	Try: G. Pisi 15' m North (2) 40' c, 47' c Con: Myler (2/3); Pen: Myler (3/3) 24', 50', 53'

Kingsholm
Attendance: 16,115
Referee: JP Doyle

7 May 2016
15:30

Harlequins	24–62	Exeter Chiefs (1 BP)
Try: Care 40' c Sinckler 54' c Stanley 71' c Con: N. Evans (1/1); Botica (2/2); Pen: N. Evans (1/1) 3'	Report	Try: Short (2) 8' m, 49' c Nowell (3) 12' m, 42' m, 53' c Ewers 20' c Dollman 58' c Chudley 64' c Slade 66' m Salvi 73' c Con: Steenson (6/10)

Twickenham Stoop
Attendance: 14,800
Referee: Wayne Barnes

7 May 2016
15:30

(1 BP) Newcastle Falcons	15–21	Sale Sharks
Try: Latu (3) 16' m, 34' m, 47' m	Report	Try: Seymour 9' m James 23' c Con: Cipriani (1/2); Pen: Cipriani (1/1) 13'; Ford (2/2) 51', 71'

Kingston Park
Attendance: 7,089
Referee: Matthew Carley

7 May 2016
15:30

(1 BP) Wasps	38–12	London Irish
Try: Young 24' m C. Piutau 33' m Wade 38' m Robson 61' c Bassett 65' m Johnson 68' m Con: Gopperth (1/3); Pen: Jackson (2/2) 2', 18'	Report	Try: Williams 21' c Lewington 59' m Con: Brophy-Clews (1/2)

Ricoh Arena
Attendance: 16,902
Referee: Thomas Foley

7 May 2016
15:30

Worcester Warriors	19–43	Saracens (1 BP)
Try: Symons 2' c Vuna (2) 17' c, 75' m Con: Heathcote (2/2)	Report	Try: de Kock 6' c Ashton (3) 24' m, 39' c, 50' c Vunisa 37' c Ransom 64' c Con: Hodgson (5/6); Pen: Hodgson (1/2) 31'

Sixways Stadium
Attendance: 9,722
Referee: Luke Pearce

== Play-offs ==
As in previous seasons, the top four teams in the Premiership table, following the conclusion of the regular season, contest the play-off semi-finals in a 1st vs 4th and 2nd vs 3rd format, with the higher ranking team having home advantage. The two winners of the semi-finals then meet in the Premiership Final at Twickenham on 28 May 2016.

=== Bracket ===
Semi-finals
21 May 2016 – Allianz Park
Saracens	44
Leicester Tigers	17
21 May 2016 – Sandy Park
Exeter Chiefs	34
Wasps	23

Final
28 May 2016 – Twickenham
Saracens	28
Exeter Chiefs	20

=== Semi-finals ===
21 May 2016
12:30

Saracens (1)	44–17	(4) Leicester Tigers
Try: Fraser 3' c Wyles (2) 19' c, 39' c Ashton (2) 24' c, 71' c Con: Farrell (4/4) 4', 20', 25', 40'; Hodgson (1/1) 72'; Pen: Farrell (1/2) 32'; Hodgson (2/2) 61', 69'	Report	Try: Veainu 41' c Barrow 50' c Con: O. Williams (2/2) 42', 51'; Pen: O. Williams (1/2) 44'

Allianz Park
Attendance: 9,932
Referee: JP Doyle

Team details

FB	15	(England) Alex Goode
RW	14	(England) Chris Ashton
OC	13	(Scotland) Duncan Taylor		(substituted off) 52'
IC	12	(England) Brad Barritt (c)
LW	11	(United States) Chris Wyles
FH	10	(England) Owen Farrell		(substituted off) 60'
SH	9	(England) Richard Wigglesworth		(substituted off) 57'
N8	8	(England) Billy Vunipola		(substituted off) 72'
OF	7	(England) Will Fraser	(yellow card) 49'
BF	6	(South Africa) Michael Rhodes		(substituted off) 60'
RL	5	(England) George Kruis
LL	4	(England) Maro Itoje
TP	3	(South Africa) Petrus du Plessis		(substituted off) 54'
HK	2	(South Africa) Schalk Brits		(substituted off) 47'
LP	1	(England) Mako Vunipola		(substituted off) 69'
Substitutions:
HK	16	(England) Jamie George		(substituted in) 47'
PR	17	(England) Richard Barrington		(substituted in) 69'
PR	18	(Argentina) Juan Figallo		(substituted in) 54'
LK	19	(Scotland) Jim Hamilton		(substituted in) 72'
FL	20	(England) Jackson Wray		(substituted in) 60'
SH	21	(South Africa) Neil de Kock		(substituted in) 57'
FH	22	(England) Charlie Hodgson		(substituted in) 60'
CE	23	(Argentina) Marcelo Bosch		(substituted in) 52'
Coach:
(Ireland) Mark McCall

FB	15	(England) Mathew Tait
RW	14	(Tonga) Telusa Veainu
OC	13	(Australia) Peter Betham	(substituted off) 78'
IC	12	(England) Manu Tuilagi	(substituted off) 21'
LW	11	(Fiji) Vereniki Goneva
FH	10	(Wales) Owen Williams
SH	9	(England) Ben Youngs	(substituted off) 73'
N8	8	(Australia) Lachlan McCaffrey
OF	7	(New Zealand) Brendon O'Connor
BF	6	(New Zealand) Michael Fitzgerald	59' to 64'		(substituted off) 69'
RL	5	(England) Graham Kitchener (c)	(substituted off) 57'
LL	4	(England) Dominic Barrow
TP	3	(England) Dan Cole	(substituted off) 65'
HK	2	(England) Harry Thacker	22' to 32'		(substituted off) 45'	(substituted in) 65'
LP	1	(Argentina) Marcos Ayerza	(substituted off) 53'
Substitutions:
HK	16	(Italy) Leonardo Ghiraldini	(substituted in) 22'	(substituted off) 32'	(substituted in) 45'	(substituted off) 65'
PR	17	(England) Ellis Genge	(substituted in) 53'
PR	18	(Samoa) Logovi'i Mulipola	(substituted in) 65'
LK	19	(England) Ed Slater	(substituted in) 57'
FL	20	(England) Will Evans	(substituted in) 59'	(substituted off) 64'	(substituted in) 69'
SH	21	(New Zealand) Jono Kitto	(substituted in) 73'
FB	22	(England) Tommy Bell	(substituted in) 78'
WG	23	(England) Adam Thompstone	(substituted in) 21'
Coach:
(England) Richard Cockerill

21 May 2016
15:15

Exeter Chiefs (2)	34–23	(3) Wasps
Try: Whitten 21' c Penalty try (2) 38' c, 79' c Ewers 46' c Con: Steenson (4/4) 22', 39', 47', 80'; Pen: Steenson (2/2) 3', 11'	Report	Try: Festuccia 16' c Robson 31' c Con: Gopperth (2/2) 17', 32'; Pen: Gopperth (3/3) 45', 52', 67'

Sandy Park
Attendance: 12,604
Referee: Greg Garner

Team details

FB	15	(Wales) Phil Dollman
RW	14	(England) Jack Nowell
OC	13	(England) Henry Slade
IC	12	(Ireland) Ian Whitten	(substituted off) 60'
LW	11	(England) Olly Woodburn
FH	10	(Ireland) Gareth Steenson
SH	9	(England) Will Chudley
N8	8	(England) Don Armand
OF	7	(Australia) Julian Salvi
BF	6	(England) Dave Ewers	(substituted off) 60'
RL	5	(England) Geoff Parling
LL	4	(Australia) Mitch Lees
TP	3	(England) Harry Williams	(substituted off) 52'
HK	2	(England) Luke Cowan-Dickie	(substituted off) 52'
LP	1	(England) Ben Moon	(substituted off) 52'
Replacements:
HK	16	(England) Jack Yeandle	(substituted in) 52'
PR	17	(England) Alec Hepburn	(substituted in) 52'
PR	18	(Wales) Tomas Francis	(substituted in) 52'
LK	19	(Australia) Ollie Atkins
FL	20	(England) Thomas Waldrom	(substituted in) 60'
SH	21	(England) Dave Lewis
CE	22	(England) Sam Hill	(substituted in) 60'
WG	23	(England) James Short
Coach:
(England) Rob Baxter

FB	15	(New Zealand) Charles Piutau
RW	14	(England) Christian Wade
OC	13	(England) Elliot Daly
IC	12	(Tonga) Siale Piutau
LW	11	(New Zealand) Frank Halai		(substituted off) 42'	(substituted in) 49'
FH	10	(New Zealand) Jimmy Gopperth
SH	9	(England) Dan Robson		(substituted off) 67'
N8	8	(England) Nathan Hughes		(substituted off) 67'
OF	7	(Australia) George Smith
BF	6	(England) James Haskell
RL	5	(Wales) Bradley Davies
LL	4	(England) Joe Launchbury (c)
TP	3	(England) Jake Cooper-Woolley
HK	2	(Italy) Carlo Festuccia	(yellow card) 38'
LP	1	(England) Matt Mullan		(substituted off) 59'
Substitutions:
HK	16	(South Africa) Ashley Johnson		(substituted in) 42'	(substituted off) 49'
PR	17	(England) Simon McIntyre		(substituted in) 59'
PR	18	(Italy) Lorenzo Cittadini
LK	19	(England) Will Rowlands
FL	20	(England) Sam Jones		(substituted in) 67'
SH	21	(England) Joe Simpson		(substituted in) 67'
FH	22	(Scotland) Ruaridh Jackson
FB	23	(England) Rob Miller
Coach:
(Wales) Dai Young

=== Final ===
28 May 2016
15:00

Saracens (1)	28–20	(2) Exeter Chiefs
Try: Taylor 33' c Wyles 36' c Goode 75' m Con: Farrell (2/2) 34', 37'; Pen: Farrell (3/3) 2', 9', 26'	Report	Try: Yeandle 52' c Nowell 72' c Con: Steenson (2/2) 53', 73'; Pen: Steenson (2/2) 22', 40'

Twickenham Stadium
Attendance: 77,109
Referee: Wayne Barnes

Saracens
Exeter Chiefs

FB	15	(England) Alex Goode
RW	14	(England) Chris Ashton
OC	13	(Scotland) Duncan Taylor	(substituted off) 73'
IC	12	(England) Brad Barritt (c)
LW	11	(United States) Chris Wyles
FH	10	(England) Owen Farrell	(substituted off) 67'
SH	9	(England) Richard Wigglesworth	(substituted off) 67'
N8	8	(England) Billy Vunipola
OF	7	(England) Will Fraser	(substituted off) 70'
BF	6	(South Africa) Michael Rhodes	(substituted off) 51'
RL	5	(England) George Kruis
LL	4	(England) Maro Itoje
TP	3	(South Africa) Petrus du Plessis	(substituted off) 51'
HK	2	(South Africa) Schalk Brits	(substituted off) 51'
LP	1	(England) Mako Vunipola	(substituted off) 65'
Substitutions:
HK	16	(England) Jamie George	(substituted in) 51'
PR	17	(England) Richard Barrington	(substituted in) 65'
PR	18	(Argentina) Juan Figallo	(substituted in) 51'
LK	19	(Scotland) Jim Hamilton	(substituted in) 70'
FL	20	(England) Jackson Wray	(substituted in) 51'
SH	21	(South Africa) Neil de Kock	(substituted in) 67'
FH	22	(England) Charlie Hodgson	(substituted in) 67'
CE	23	(Argentina) Marcelo Bosch	(substituted in) 73'
Coach:
(Ireland) Mark McCall

FB	15	(Wales) Phil Dollman
RW	14	(England) Jack Nowell
OC	13	(England) Henry Slade
IC	12	(Ireland) Ian Whitten	(substituted off) 67'
LW	11	(England) Olly Woodburn	(substituted off) 54'
FH	10	(Ireland) Gareth Steenson
SH	9	(England) Will Chudley	(substituted off) 64'
N8	8	(England) Don Armand		(substituted off) 64'
OF	7	(Australia) Julian Salvi	(substituted off) 60'	(substituted in) 64'
BF	6	(England) Dave Ewers
RL	5	(England) Geoff Parling	(substituted off) 63'
LL	4	(Australia) Mitch Lees
TP	3	(England) Harry Williams	(substituted off) 46'
HK	2	(England) Luke Cowan-Dickie	(substituted off) 46'	(substituted in) 67'	(substituted off) 73'
LP	1	(England) Ben Moon	(substituted off) 46'
Replacements:
HK	16	(England) Jack Yeandle	(substituted in) 46'	(substituted off) 67'	(substituted in) 73'
PR	17	(England) Alec Hepburn	(substituted in) 46'
PR	18	(Wales) Tomas Francis	(substituted in) 46'
LK	19	(England) Damian Welch	(substituted in) 63'
FL	20	(England) Kai Horstmann	(substituted in) 60'
SH	21	(England) Dave Lewis	(substituted in) 64'
CE	22	(Italy) Michele Campagnaro	(substituted in) 67'
WG	23	(England) James Short	(substituted in) 54'
Coach:
(England) Rob Baxter

Man of the Match:
(England) Alex Goode (Saracens)

Assistant referees:
JP Doyle
Luke Pearce
Television Match Official:
Sean Davey

== Leading scorers ==
Note: Flags indicate national union as has been defined under WR eligibility rules. Players may hold more than one non-WR nationality.

=== Most points ===
Rank	Player	Club	Points
1	(Ireland) Gareth Steenson	Exeter Chiefs	258
2	(New Zealand) Jimmy Gopperth	Wasps	185
3	(England) Danny Cipriani	Sale Sharks	182
4	(England) Stephen Myler	Northampton Saints	173
5	(England) Charlie Hodgson	Saracens	154
6	(New Zealand) Nick Evans	Harlequins	153
7	(Scotland) Tom Heathcote	Worcester Warriors	143
8	(New Zealand) Ben Botica	Harlequins	129
9	(England) Owen Farrell	Saracens	122
10	(Wales) James Hook	Gloucester	118

=== Most tries ===
Rank	Player	Club	Tries
1	(England) Thomas Waldrom	Exeter Chiefs	13
2	(England) Semesa Rokoduguni	Bath	12
2	(England) Christian Wade	Wasps	12
4	(England) Chris Ashton	Saracens	11
5	(England) Charlie Walker	Harlequins	10
6	(New Zealand) Frank Halai	Wasps	9
6	(Tonga) Nili Latu	Newcastle Falcons	9
6	(England) James Short	Exeter Chiefs	9
6	(Tonga) Telusa Veainu	Leicester Tigers	9
6	(Scotland) Tim Visser	Harlequins	9
6	(Australia) Cooper Vuna	Worcester Warriors	9

== Awards ==
=== Player of the Month ===
The following received Player of the Month awards during the 2015–16 season, as selected by a panel of media commentators, in addition to monthly public polls.

Month	Nationality	Player	Position	Club
October	New Zealand	Nick Evans	Fly-Half	Harlequins
November	England	Nathan Hughes	Number 8	Wasps
December	England	Maro Itoje	Lock	Saracens
January	England	Thomas Waldrom	Number 8	Exeter
February	Australia	George Smith	Flanker	Wasps
March	South Africa	Francois Hougaard	Scrum-Half	Worcester
April	England	Teimana Harrison	Flanker	Northampton

=== End-of-season awards ===
The winners of the 2016 Premiership Rugby Awards were announced on 18 May 2016.

Player of the Season
Nationality	Nominee	Club	Winner
England	Don Armand	Exeter	(England); Alex Goode
England	Alex Goode	Saracens	(England); Alex Goode
England	Maro Itoje	Saracens	(England); Alex Goode
New Zealand	Charles Piutau	Wasps	(England); Alex Goode
Australia	George Smith	Wasps	(England); Alex Goode
Ireland	Gareth Steenson	Exeter	(England); Alex Goode

Young Player of the Season
Nationality	Nominee	Club	Winner
England	Jack Clifford	Harlequins	(England); Maro Itoje
England	Paul Hill	Northampton	(England); Maro Itoje
England	Maro Itoje	Saracens	(England); Maro Itoje
England	Sam James	Sale	(England); Maro Itoje
England	Harry Mallinder	Northampton	(England); Maro Itoje
England	Harry Thacker	Leicester	(England); Maro Itoje

Director of Rugby of the Season
Nationality	Nominee	Club	Winner
England	Rob Baxter	Exeter	(Ireland); Mark McCall
England	Steve Diamond	Sale	(Ireland); Mark McCall
Ireland	Mark McCall	Saracens	(Ireland); Mark McCall
Wales	Dai Young	Wasps	(Ireland); Mark McCall

Community Player of the Season
Nationality	Nominee	Club	Winner
England	Don Armand	Exeter	(Ireland); John O'Donnell
England	Sam Betty	Worcester	(Ireland); John O'Donnell
England	Will Fraser	Saracens	(Ireland); John O'Donnell
Ireland	John O'Donnell	Sale	(Ireland); John O'Donnell
England	Rob Vickers	Newcastle	(Ireland); John O'Donnell

Forwards
No.	Nationality	Player	Position	Club
1	England	Mako Vunipola	Prop	Saracens
2	England	Mike Haywood	Hooker	Northampton
3	Moldova	Vadim Cobîlaș	Prop	Sale
4	England	Maro Itoje	Lock	Saracens
5	England	George Kruis	Lock	Saracens
6	England	Teimana Harrison	Flanker	Northampton
7	Australia	George Smith	Flanker	Wasps
8	England	Billy Vunipola	Number 8	Saracens

Backs
No.	Nationality	Player	Position	Club
9	South Africa	Francois Hougaard	Scrum-Half	Worcester
10	Ireland	Gareth Steenson	Fly-Half	Exeter
11	Tonga	Telusa Veainu	Wing	Leicester
12	New Zealand	Charles Piutau	Centre	Wasps
13	England	Elliot Daly	Centre	Wasps
14	England	Jack Nowell	Wing	Exeter
15	England	Alex Goode	Full-Back	Saracens
