= 2015–16 Sale Sharks season =

Sale Sharks signed four experienced players for the 2015–16 season: Springbok tighthead Brian Mujati, All Black second row Bryn Evans, Irish legend Peter Stringer, and former hooker Neil Briggs. These signings followed the departure of several Sharks such as Marc Jones and Will Cliff to Bristol, and Luke McLean at the end of the previous season, with Alberto DeMarchi returning to Treviso and Michael Paterson going to Northampton as well as the retirements of Nathan Hines and club legend, the all-time record Premiership try scorer Mark Cueto.

Due to the World Cup, the Aviva Premiership was delayed until mid-October. The 'Kings of the North' tournament was arranged between Sale Sharks, Newcastle and Leicester. Sale Sharks won the tournament on points difference over Leicester following two wins against Newcastle and a home win against Leicester.

The Premiership season started badly for Sale Sharks with a 41–3 defeat at the hands of reigning champions Saracens. However, in the following week, they earned a 27–13 bonus point win at home to newly promoted Worcester. Followed by a 20–13 home win over Northampton with 21 year-old Sharks center Sam James scoring a first Premiership try. The first set of Premiership fixtures concluded with a narrow 16–14 defeat at Harlequins, leaving Sale Sharks 7th in the league.

Sale Sharks were drawn in Pool 2 of the European Rugby Challenge Cup with Newport and French sides Pau and Castres, they rotated their squad and lost 30–12 at Newport before a four-try win 29–20 a week later at home to Pau.

Returning to Premiership action Sale Sharks drew at home 15–15 with Newcastle before another close defeat 23–19, despite two tries from new winger Nev Edwards away at Gloucester in the final league game before Christmas, with Sale Sharks 8th in the table.

In December, two wins away (17–10) and home (31–10) against Castres kept Sale Sharks in contention for a Challenge Cup quarter final place.

On Boxing Day, Sale Sharks lost 33–17 at Exeter following a strong last 20 minutes from the home side, before an excellent team performance resulted in a 15–9 win at home to top-six rivals Wasps.

During the Challenge Cup, Sale Sharks won away 27–3 against Pau (the same scoreline as their 2004–05 European Challenge Cup Final victory over the same opponent) securing a four-try bonus point and setting up a winner-takes-all clash with Newport to top the pool. Sale produced a performance scoring four tries in a comfortable 38–5 victory to qualify for a home quarter final against Montpellier.

Sale Shark's fine form continued with them easing to a 38–10 home win over relegation-threatened London Irish.
