= Michael Dewar =

Michael Dewar may refer to:

- Michael J. S. Dewar (1918–1997), theoretical chemist
- Michael Dewar (rugby union) (born 1997), Scottish rugby union player
