= Don Armand =

Zimbabwean rugby union player

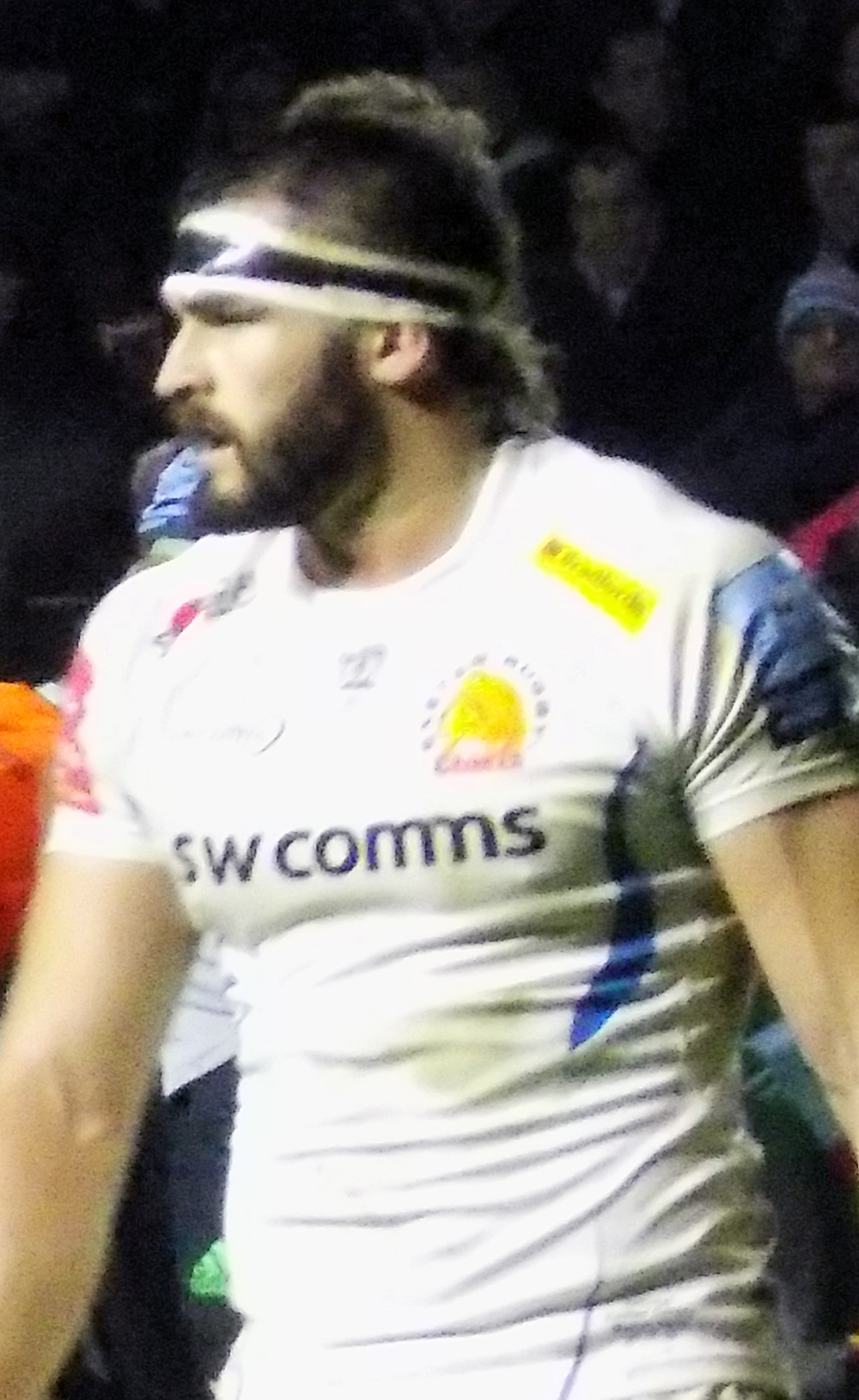
- Armand playing for Exeter Chiefs, 2018
- Full name: Donovan Wade Armand
- Born: 23 September 1988 (age 38) Harare, Zimbabwe
- Height: 1.91 m (6 ft 3 in)
- Weight: 115 kg (18 st 2 lb; 254 lb)
- School: Maritzburg College
- University: University of Cape Town

Rugby union career
- Position: Flanker
- Current team: Retired
Youth career
- 2006: Sharks
Amateur team(s)
Years	Team	Apps	(Points)
2008–2012	UCT Ikey Tigers	27	(5)
Senior career
Years	Team	Apps	(Points)
2012–2013	Western Province	19	(5)
2012–2013	Stormers	16	(0)
2013–2022	Exeter Chiefs	193	(185)
- Correct as of 08 December 2018
International career
Years	Team	Apps	(Points)
2017-2018	England	2	(0)
- Correct as of 17 March 2018

Donovan Wade Armand (born 23 September 1988) is a former Zimbabwean-born England international rugby union footballer. Originally from Zimbabwe, he played as a flanker for Exeter Chiefs in the English Premiership.

== Professional career ==
=== Zimbabwe ===
Armand grew up in Zimbabwe and attended Highlands Junior School in Harare.

=== South Africa ===
After the Zimbabwean land-reform, Armand moved to South Africa and attended Maritzburg College. He made his debut with the South African team Western Province on 10 March 2012 in a 51–22 victory over the Boland Cavaliers. He finished the 2012 Vodacom Cup season with six appearances and one try.

Due to injuries sustained by loose-forwards Duane Vermeulen and Nick Köster on the Stormers' 2012 Australasian tour, Armand received a call-up to the squad for the final tour game against the Western Force. The match ended in a 17–3 Stormers victory. He made his Super Rugby debut as a 75th-minute replacement for Nizaam Carr.

Armand was a fixture in the 2012 Western Province Currie Cup side and started the winning final against the Sharks in Durban.

He has also represented the Ikey Tigers in the Varsity Cup.

=== Exeter Chiefs ===
On 17 July 2013, it was confirmed that Armand would be joining English Aviva Premiership side Exeter Chiefs on a two-year contract. Armand has been a key player in Exeter Chiefs successful 2017 Aviva season becoming Champions of England on 27 May 2017. He was named man of the match in the final, where the Chiefs recorded their first ever league win with a 23-20 extra-time victory over Wasps.

Armand made his Exeter Chiefs debut against the Leicester Tigers in the Aviva Premiership in September 2013. He appeared 11 times in the 2013–14 season, mostly as a substitute. In 2014–15, Armand appeared 12 times, starting in 10 of those appearances. Armand had a breakout season in 2015–16, appearing 21 times in the Aviva Premiership, starting each match and playing a total of 1,611 minutes. Armand also appeared in the Chiefs' European Champions Cup campaign and started the 2016 Aviva Premiership final. Armand was nominated for the Aviva Premiership player of the year award, which was won by Alex Goode. Armand won the Exeter Chiefs Supporters' player of the year award for 2016 and also earned an England Saxons call up for their summer tour of South Africa. He started the final and was voted man of the match as Exeter Chiefs defeated Wasps to be crowned champions of the 2016-17 English Premiership. He announced his retirement following the 2021–22 season.

== International career ==
In 2016, Armand was selected for the England Saxons' tour of South Africa.

In 2017 Armand was named in the touring squad to Argentina. Armand won his first international cap for England on 10 June 2017 in their 34-38 victory over Argentina, coming on as a substitute in the second half. Armand's second cap and Six Nations Championship debut came as a late sub in England's defeat to Ireland in the 2018 tournament.
