= Maxim Cobîlaș =

- Full name: Maxim Cobîlaș
- Born: 12 August 1986 Soroca, Moldova
- Height: 185 cm (6 ft 1 in)
- Weight: 105 kg (231 lb; 16 st 7 lb)
- Notable relative: Vadim Cobîlaș (brother)

Rugby union career
- Position: Prop
Senior career
Years	Team	Apps	(Points)
2008–2012	VVA-Podmoskovye		
2012–2014	Krasny Yar Krasnoyarsk	29	(5)
2014–2016	Sale Sharks	15	(5)
2016–2018	AS Mâcon	41	(5)
2018–2019	Union Bordeaux Begles		
2019–2020	VVA-Podmoskovye		
- Correct as of 27 May 2020
International career
Years	Team	Apps	(Points)
2008-	Moldova		
- Correct as of 27 May 2020

Maxim Cobîlaș (born 12 August 1986) is a Moldovan rugby union football player who plays as a prop for professional Rugby Premier League club VVA-Podmoskovye. Cobîlaș is also the brother of current Union Bordeaux Begles prop, Vadim Cobîlaș.

== Club career ==
Maxim Cobîlaș first started playing professional rugby in 2008 for VVA-Podmoskovye with his brother Vadim until 2012, where he then transferred to Russian rivals Krasny Yar Krasnoyarsk playing in 29 matches and scoring only 5 points. After two years at the club, Maxim earned the opportunity to play alongside his brother again at Premiership Rugby side Sale Sharks due to Vadim`s connection with Steve Diamond who was the former Russia rugby coach that knew Vadim Cobîlaș when watching games and scouting Russian players. Upon the end of his contract with Sale, Maxim scored a contract and played for AS Mâcon who were in the Fédérale 1 at the time, where he played 41 matches and scored one try. As the 2018-2019 season approached, Cobîlaș signed with Union Bordeaux Begles where his brother was also playing which meant the Moldovan duo were re-united at last. Maxim then became a free agent for a few months after his stint at Bordeaux before signing to play for VVA-Podmoskovye again.

Maxim Cobîlaș and his brother Vadim have represented Moldova since 2008 and 2005 respectively becoming the nation's most successful rugby players abroad. Maxim Cobîlaș is still active for the national team even playing in November 2019 in a game against Austria Rugby in a REIC Conference 2 North match up.
