= Jamie Gibson =

English rugby union player

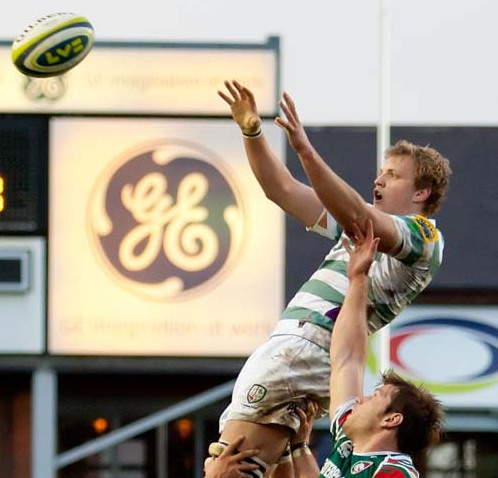
- Gibson in a line-out during a match with Leicester on 18 November 2012
- Born: James George Selwyn Gibson; 27 September 1990 (age 36) London
- Height: 1.96 m (6 ft 5 in)
- Weight: 107 kg (16 st 12 lb)
- School: Marlborough College

Rugby union career
- Position: Flanker
- Current team: Gloucester
Senior career
Years	Team	Apps	(Points)
2009–2013	London Irish	70	(5)
2013–2015	Leicester Tigers	54	(25)
2015–2020	Northampton Saints	129	(50)
2020–	Gloucester	7	(0)
- Correct as of 8 March 2020
International career
Years	Team	Apps	(Points)
2008	England U18s		
2010	England U20s	8	(25)
2011–2012	England Saxons	3	(6)

James George Selwyn Gibson (born 27 September 1990) is an English rugby union player who plays flanker for Gloucester in Premiership Rugby, England's top division. He has previously played for London Irish, Leicester Tigers and Northampton Saints appearing in over 250 professional games.

== Career ==
=== Junior career ===
Gibson attended Marlborough College in Wiltshire, where he captained the renowned school's team, and started reading Classics at University College, Oxford, though he missed out on the Varsity Match against Cambridge two years in a row through injury.

Gibson was a member of the Grand Slam winning England U18 side in 2008 and was a member of the England Under 20 team that reached the third place play off in the 2010 IRB Junior World Championship. He had an outstanding tournament scoring tries in important pool game wins against Ireland and France.

=== Professional career ===
Gibson went on to have a successful 2010–2011 at London Irish starting multiple games at openside flanker, permanently replacing the departing Steffon Armitage. Gibson went on to have an outstanding summer playing for England in the non cap match against the Barbarians, and later was involved in the England Saxons Churchill Cup winning squad, scoring against Canada. He played for London Irish between 2009–2013 making 70 appearances before subsequently moving on to play for Leicester Tigers. In January 2015, he signed for Northampton Saints for the 2015/2016 season. Starting alongside England internationals Tom Wood, Teimana Harrison and, for the 2016/17 season France legend Louis Picamoles, Gibson made 56 appearances for the Midlands side.

In January 2012, Gibson was named in the England Saxons squad and on 27 May 2012, he made his senior England debut from the bench in the non-cap game against the Barbarians at Twickenham. He was also selected for the England squad to face the Barbarians in the summer of 2014.

A knee injury to Wasps' Joe Launchbury saw Gibson called up to the England senior squad for the summer tour of South Africa in June 2012, though he did not feature in a test.

Gibson's success with Northampton included helping to them secure a European Rugby Champions Cup spot for the 2017/18 season after seeing off first Connacht Rugby then Stade Français in the European Champions Cup play-off games. He left Northampton at the end of the 2019–20 season.

On 4 November 2020, Gibson signed for Gloucester ahead of the 2020–21 season.
