= James Gaskell =

England international rugby union player

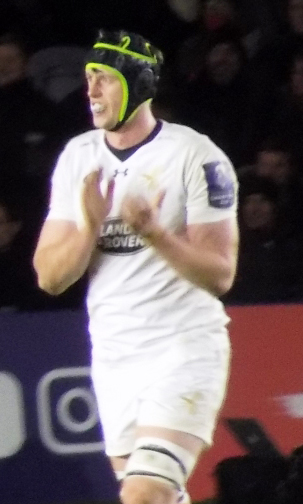
- James Gaskell at Wasps, 2014
- Born: 20 May 1990 (age 36) Crewe, Cheshire
- Height: 2.01 m (6 ft 7 in)
- Weight: 116 kg (256 lb; 18 st 4 lb)
- School: Sandbach School

Rugby union career
- Position(s): Flanker, Lock
Senior career
Years	Team	Apps	(Points)
<2008	Sandbach		
2008–2014	Sale Sharks	97	(55)
2014–2022	Wasps	100	(10)
2022–2026	Shokki Shuttles	38	(15)
International career
Years	Team	Apps	(Points)
	England	1	(0)

James Gaskell (born 20 May 1990) is a rugby union player for Shokki Shuttles in the Top League. He plays as a flanker or lock. After making the debut for Sale in 2008, Gaskell was named the club's Breakthrough Player of the Year for the 2009/10 season. Gaskell was named club captain for the 2010/11 season, making him the youngest captain in the history of the Premiership. He was injured for much of the season, and returned in January 2011. The club's coach changed while Gaskell was injured, and a new captain was appointed.

== Career ==
Gaskell was educated at Sandbach School in Cheshire and first played rugby at Sandbach Rugby Club, and graduated from Sale Shark's rugby academy. In November 2008, the club suffered a crisis with 16 members of their 31-man senior squad either injured or unable to play due to international commitments. As a result, Gaskell was one of five academy players drafted into the side to make their Premiership debut in a match against Worcester Warriors. Two months later, Gaskell was named in England Under 20s Elite Squad for the Under 20s Six Nations. He was named Sale's Academy Player of the Year for the 2008/09 season.

Gaskell scored his first try for the Sharks in a 27–26 win over Cardiff Blues at Edgley Park in the Heineken Cup on 16 October 2009. He was named Sale's Breakthrough Player of the Year and Player's Player of the Year for the 2009/10 season. Gaskell's try in a 21–16 win over against Harlequins on 1 January 2010 was voted Sale's try of the season. He sprinted over 40 yards (37 m) after receiving a pass from Neil Briggs to score his third try of the season. Gaskell was also voted Sale's "players' player of the season" for 2009/2010.

Mike Brewer replaced former Sale and England player Jason Robinson as the club's head coach in April 2010 after a season in which Sale narrowly avoided relegation from the Premiership. Brewer instigated a number of changes including signing more than ten new players and a releasing similar number. Announced on 31 August, one such change was the appointment of Gaskell as club captain for the 2010/11 season ahead of Sale's international players such as Charlie Hodgson and Mark Cueto. Brewer explained the decision, saying that "I know it will be a surprise to a lot of people thanks to James' age but, as far as what I'm looking for in a captain which is someone to take the club forward on this journey which we're about to embark on. I see him as a key player in the squad over the next three to five years. The biggest trait I'm looking for in a captain is someone who is prepared to put his body on the line and someone who won't be asking others to do something he's not prepared to do himself. James might be only 20 but I think he's a lot older in terms of his experience and rugby knowledge and I think he'll be a real success for the team and I know the players are right behind him."

At just 20 years and 106 days old, he was the youngest captain in the club's history, and in the history of the Premiership. At the time he had started just ten matches for the club. Early in the season, Gaskell suffered an injury scare in a match against Saracens; it was feared he may have fractured his leg, however he was soon able to return to play for Sale. Less than a month later, in October, Gaskell suffered an injury to his ankle meaning he would be unable to play for 14 to 16 weeks. In Gaskell's absence, Neil Briggs was handed the captaincy for the rest of the season and it was planned that Gaskell would return to the captaincy at the start of the following season.

In January 2011 Gaskell returned from injury, and scored a try in Sale's 28–22 win over Saracens. It was his third try for Sale in twenty matches. During Gaskell's absence Brewer was sacked, Sale having won three of their first nine Premiership matches of the season; Pete Anglesea replaced Brewer as coach and soon after appointed winger Mark Cueto as captain.

On 6 February 2014, Gaskell signed for the Wasps from the 2014–15 season.

On 22 August 2022, it was confirmed that Gaskell had left Wasps to join Top League club, Toyota Industries Shuttles Aichi.

== International career ==
Gaskell was selected for the England squad to face the Barbarians in the summer of 2014.
