= Andy Symons =

English rugby union player

- Born: 29 June 1991 (age 35) Harlow, England
- Height: 1.96 m (6 ft 5 in)
- Weight: 110 kg (17 st 5 lb)
- Notable relative: Matt Symons

Rugby union career
- Position: Centre
- Current team: Vannes
Senior career
Years	Team	Apps	(Points)
2013	Tasman	8	(14)
2013–2016	Worcester Warriors	23	(42)
2016–2018	Gloucester Rugby	24	(5)
2018–2020	Northampton Saints	17	(15)
2020–	Vannes		

Andy Symons (born 29 June 1991, Harlow) is an English rugby union player. He plays for Vannes in the Pro D2. He previously played for Gloucester, Worcester Warriors, Leicester Tigers, Doncaster Knights, Tasman Makos and Northampton Saints.

He plays as a centre or fly-half.

Symons started his career playing for Saracens Amateurs and Old Albanians, before joining the Saracens academy.

In November 2013, Symons signed for Worcester after spending a season playing for Tasman in the ITM Cup. Symons made his Worcester debut in an LV Cup win at Cardiff Blues in November 2013 and scored a try on his Aviva Premiership debut against Leicester Tigers at Sixways on 15 November 2013

Symons was to leave Worcester and join older brother Matt at London Irish from the 2016–17 season. However, following Matt's departure it was later announced that he wishes to pursue his career elsewhere and on 9 June 2016 it was announced that Symons would be joining Gloucester Rugby instead.

On 26 March 2018 it was announced that Symons would be moving to Northampton Saints at the end of the 2017/18 season where he remained until June 2020.

On 28 June 2020, Symons would sign for Pro D2 outfit Vannes in France for the 2020–21 season.
