= James Short (rugby union) =

English rugby union player

- Born: James Short; 15 October 1989 (age 37) Redhill, England
- Height: 1.83 m (6 ft 0 in)
- Weight: 85 kg (13 st 5 lb)

Rugby union career
- Position: Wing
- Current team: Exeter Chiefs
Senior career
Years	Team	Apps	(Points)
2007–2013	Saracens	51	(55)
2013-2014	Wasps	6	(5)
2014-2015	London Irish	13	(15)
2015-	Exeter Chiefs	66	(155)

James Short (born 15 October 1989) is an English rugby union player. He plays at Wing for Exeter Chiefs in the Aviva Premiership. He was educated at Tonbridge School in Kent.

== Club career ==
Short arrived at Saracens in 2007.

The 2010–2011 season was really Short's breakthrough season for the Saracens team. He played regularly in the Saracens team and got a reputation for being a prolific try scorer and was the top try scorer for Saracens. Short also scored the only try in the 2011 Aviva Premiership Final helping Saracens to win their first ever Premiership final in a 22–18 victory over Leicester Tigers. Overall in the season Short made 24 appearances and scored 13 tries.

At the end of the 2013/14 season he joined London Irish.

On 23 July 2015 it was announced that Short would be joining Premiership Rivals, Exeter Chiefs.
