= Jake Cooper-Woolley =

English rugby union player (born 1989)

- Born: Jake Cooper-Woolley; 18 November 1989 (age 36) Redhill, Surrey
- Height: 1.90 m (6 ft 3 in)
- Weight: 127 kg (20 st 0 lb)
- University: Cardiff University

Rugby union career
- Position: Tighthead Prop
- Current team: Sale Sharks
Senior career
Years	Team	Apps	(Points)
2010–2013	Cardiff Blues	0	(0)
2010–2012	Bedwas	25	(5)
2013	Cardiff	5	(10)
2013–2019	Wasps	114	(25)
2019–	Sale Sharks	36	(10)
- Correct as of 25 March 2021
International career
Years	Team	Apps	(Points)
2015–2016	England Saxons		
- Correct as of 30 May 2018

Jake Cooper-Woolley (born 18 November 1989) is an English professional rugby union player. He previously played Prop for Sale Sharks. Since 2022, he has become a key part of the Kefron UK sales team.

== Early life ==
Cooper-Woolley was born in Reigate and attended St Bede's School in Redhill, Surrey. While at school, he played for Dorking and was a part of the Harlequins Elite Player Development Group (EPDG) before deciding to focus on his studies at Cardiff University, Cooper-Woolley also competed in the England Schools Championship at shot-putt.

== Club career ==
While studying at Cardiff University, Cooper-Woolley signed for the Cardiff Blues regional side, and played club rugby for Bedwas for two seasons (2010–11 and 2011–12), scoring one try in 25 appearances. He also played five times for Cardiff RFC in 2013, scoring two tries.

Cooper-Woolley was a try-scorer when leading Cardiff University in the 2012 Welsh Varsity Match.

Cooper-Woolley signed for Wasps for the 2013-14 season. In May 2016 it was announced that his contract with Wasps had been extended.

After six seasons with Wasps, Cooper-Woolley signs for Premiership rivals Sale Sharks from the 2019-20 season.

== International career ==
Member of England Saxons, debut in win against Ireland in 2015 (RFU profile)
