= Oliver Bryant =

English rugby union player

- Born: Oliver Mark Bryant; 8 May 1995 (age 31) Truro, Cornwall
- School: Redruth School

Rugby union career
- Position: Fly Half
- Current team: Jersey Reds
Senior career
| Years | Team | Apps | (Points) |
| 2014–2017 | Leicester Tigers | 7 | (9) |
| 2014–2016 | → Doncaster Knights | 11 | (5) |
| 2017–2018 | Jersey Reds | 11 | (2) |
| 2018– | CR El Salvador | | |
- Correct as of 27 July 2018
International career
| Years | Team | Apps | (Points) |
| 2015 | England U20 | | |
- Correct as of September 2016

Oliver Bryant (born 8 May 1995) is an English rugby union player who plays at fly half for CR El Salvador in Spain's top level of rugby union the División de Honor de Rugby. He has previously played for Leicester Tigers, Doncaster Knights and Jersey Reds in England.

== Career ==
On 1 November 2014 Bryant made his Leicester debut away to London Irish in the Anglo-Welsh Cup. Later that season Bryant was called in the England U-20s squad. On 19 February 2016 Bryant made his Premiership debut against Harlequins scoring 9 points and impressing in a 25–19 loss.

On 17 May 2017 it was announced that Bryant was to leave Welford Road and sign for Jersey in the RFU Championship from the 2017–18 season.

On 26 July 2018 it was announced that Bryant was to leave Jersey and sign for CR El Salvador in the Spanish División de Honor de Rugby from the 2018–19 season.
