= Tom Heathcote =

Scotland international rugby union player

- Born: Thomas Alexander Heathcote; 11 February 1992 (age 34) Inverness, Scotland
- Height: 1.79 m (5 ft 10 in)
- Weight: 87 kg (13 st 10 lb; 192 lb)
- School: Bishop Wordsworth's School

Rugby union career
- Position: Fly-Half
Senior career
| Years | Team | Apps | (Points) |
| 2011–2014 | Bath | 53 | (375) |
| 2014–2015 | Edinburgh | 23 | (129) |
| 2015–2018 | Worcester Warriors | 30 | (164) |
- Correct as of 1 May 2018
International career
| Years | Team | Apps | (Points) |
| 2012 | England U20 | 6 | (35) |
| 2012–2013 | Scotland | 3 | (0) |
- Correct as of 23 June 2013

Thomas Alexander Heathcote (born 11 February 1992) is a former rugby union player. His position was fly-half and he made three appearances for Scotland.

== Early life ==
Heathcote was born in Inverness whilst his English father Gareth, a Nimrod pilot, was stationed at RAF Kinloss. The family returned to England when Heathcote was three. His grandmother was from Wales.

== Career ==
On 24 September 2011 Heathcote made his first team debut for Bath against Gloucester. The following month saw him score his first points against Leicester Tigers. He claimed his first try against Worcester Warriors during the 2011–12 LV Cup and started in the semi-final defeat of that competition against Leicester.

Heathcote represented England U20 during the 2012 Six Nations Under 20s Championship and started in the final round as England defeated Ireland to win the tournament. Later that year he was a member of their squad at the 2012 IRB Junior World Championship and recorded a try in their opening game against Italy. In their last fixture of the competition he scored a dozen points in a victory over Australia as England finished in seventh place.

In November 2012 Heathcote was called up to the Scotland squad qualifying through his birthplace. On 24 November 2012 he made his international debut off the bench as a substitute in the test against Tonga at Pittodrie. In June 2013 Heathcote made his first start against Samoa. Later that month he made his third and last appearance for Scotland starting in a victory over Italy.

At the end of the 2013–14 season it was announced that Heathcote would be ending his contract with Bath one-year early and moving to Edinburgh for the 2014–15 Pro12, citing the progression of 'his career and international aspirations.' He featured as a substitute in the 2014–15 European Rugby Challenge Cup final which Edinburgh lost against Gloucester to finish runners up.

After one year in Scotland it was announced in February 2015 that Heathcote would depart Edinburgh to join Worcester Warriors. On 16 October 2015 he scored an injury time drop goal to help Warriors win their first game back in the Premiership, securing a 13–12 win over Northampton Saints. In May 2018 Heathcote was released by Worcester after a succession of head injuries.

== Honours ==
Edinburgh

- 1× EPCR Challenge Cup runner up: 2014–15

England U20

- 1× Six Nations Under 20s Championship: 2012
