= Julian Salvi =

Australian rugby union player & coach

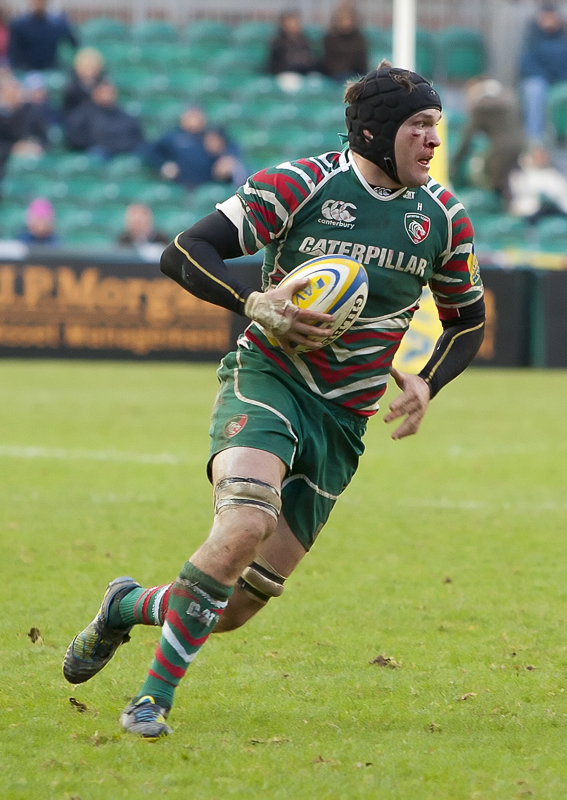
- Born: Julian Salvi; 9 October 1985 (age 41) Canberra
- Height: 1.87 m (6 ft 1 1/2 in)
- Weight: 103 kg (227 lb)
- School: Marist College, ACT

Rugby union career
- Position: Flanker
Senior career
| Years | Team | Apps | (Points) |
| 2009-2010 | Bath Rugby | 29 | (0) |
| 2011–2015 | Leicester Tigers | 113 | (55) |
| 2015–2018 | Exeter Chiefs | 53 | (15) |
Super Rugby
| Years | Team | Apps | (Points) |
| 2003–11 | Brumbies | 63 | (15) |
International career
| Years | Team | Apps | (Points) |
| 2003 | Australia Schoolboys | | |
| 2005 + 2006 | Australia U-21 | | |
| 2007 + 2008 | Australia A | 8 | |
Coaching career
- Years: Team
- 2018−2022: Exeter Chiefs(Defence coach)
- 2022−2024: Benetton(Assistant coach)
- 2024-2026: Georgia Rugby(Defence coach)
- 2026-: Racing 92(Defence coach)

Julian Salvi (born 9 October 1985), is an Australian rugby union player and coach, who currently works for the Georgia national rugby union team.

== Playing career ==
The Canberra junior and former Australian Schools and Under 21s captain enhanced his standing as a noted ball winner and breakdown specialist during his time in the Northern Hemisphere.

Having made more than 50 appearances for the Brumbies in two spells either side of a season with Bath in 2009–10 (where he picked up the West Country Club's Best Forward and Supporters' Player of the Year award), he decided to return to the England Premiership, this time with the Leicester Tigers as an injury replacement for flanker Craig Newby.

The highly rated Australian openside collected his first Premiership title with Tigers in 2013 and was also voted Player of the Year by the Tigers' supporters.

Shortlisted for Aviva Premiership Player of the Year for a second successive year, Salvi has enjoyed an impressive 2 seasons with more than 50 appearances for the club and some stand-out performances in the biggest games.

Upon completion of the 2014–2015 season Salvi will move to Exeter Chiefs for the 2015–2016 season.

== Coaching career ==
From summer 2018 Salvi worked as defence coach at Exeter Chiefs. From 2022 he is Assistant Coach for Benetton Rugby.
