= Jeff Williams (rugby union, born 1988) =

South African rugby union player

- Born: Jeffrey Williams; 16 August 1988 (age 38) East London, South Africa
- Height: 1.85 m (6 ft 1 in)
- Weight: 98 kg (15 st 6 lb).
- School: George Randell Primary School. Selborne College
- Notable relative: Matti Williams(brother)

Rugby union career
- Position(s): Wing, Centre
- Current team: RC Bassin d'Arcachon
Senior career
Years	Team	Apps	(Points)
2011-2012	RC Châteaurenard	15	(10)
2015-2018	Bath Rugby	11	(20)
2018-2019	Stade Rodez Aveyron	14	(45)
2019-2022	AS Béziers	46	(30)
2022-	Bassin d'Arcachon		
- Correct as of 20/09/2016
National sevens team
Years	Team		Comps
2012-2015	England		22

Jeff Williams (born 16 August 1988) is a South Africa born English professional rugby union player. Williams previously played Rugby sevens for England and was a member of the team which won the Tokyo Sevens. After his international playing career, Williams joined Bath Rugby Club before moving to France, where he played at AS Béziers Hérault. Williams is currently the head coach of the Belgium national rugby sevens team.

== Early life ==
Williams was born in South Africa to an English father and grew up in the suburb of Sunnyridge. He attended George Randell Primary School, in Greenfields from grade one to seven. He then moved on to Selborne College where he finished his high school career. Williams played Rugby Union for the Hamiltons club in Cape Town, and was a part of the Sharks Academy. Williams then signed for RC Chateaurenard playing in French Fédérale 1.

== Rugby Sevens ==
Williams was a member of the England Sevens team from 2012 to 2015 playing at prop or wing, he made his debut in the 2012 Marriot London Sevens. Williams opportunity to join the England Sevens team came about after his father contacted the RFU to make them aware he was eligible to play for England. Williams was contacted by Ben Ryan who offered him an opportunity to try out for the team.

Williams was a member of the England team which won the 2015 Tokyo Sevens Tournament. He scored a total of 39 tries in 22 games throughout his career.

== Rugby Union ==
In April 2015 it was announced that Williams was returning to Rugby Union having signed for Bath for the 2015/16 season. Williams' contract was extended for one year in March 2016.

Williams made his Aviva Premiership debut for Bath on 7 November 2015 in a 14–45 Victory over London Irish

== Honours ==
2012 Wellington Sevens Winners

2013 Rugby World Cup Sevens Silver Medal

2015 Japan Sevens Winners
