= Theo Brophy-Clews =

- Born: Theo Fergus Patrick Brophy Clews; 19 March 1997 (age 29) Oxford, England
- Height: 1.85 m (6 ft 1 in)
- Weight: 91 kg (201 lb; 14 st 5 lb)
- School: Abingdon School
- University: Royal Holloway, University of London

Rugby union career
- Position: Fly-half
Senior career
Years	Team	Apps	(Points)
2014–2021	London Irish	63	(110)
International career
Years	Team	Apps	(Points)
2013–2015	England U18	11	(33)
2016–2017	England U20	9	(15)
- Correct as of 18 June 2017

Theo Brophy-Clews (born 19 March 1997) is an English former rugby union player who played fly-half for London Irish and represented England at youth level.

== Education ==
Brophy-Clews was educated at Abingdon School and represented the school at many sports but excelled at Rugby and Rugby Sevens.

== Rugby career ==
Brophy-Clews joined the academy of London Irish at the age of thirteen. In January 2015 he became the club's youngest try scorer at the age of seventeen on his debut when he crossed the line against Scarlets in an Anglo-Welsh Cup fixture. Later that year he captained England Under-18 against Scotland and played against fellow Abingdon pupil Michael Dewar who was representing Scotland.

Brophy-Clews was selected for the 2016 World Rugby Under 20 Championship and made his debut at that level in the opening game against Italy. However after just half an hour he sustained a foot injury which ruled him out of the tournament which England went on to win. He played in the 2017 Six Nations Under 20s Championship and came off the bench in the last round as England beat Ireland to complete a grand slam. Later that year he was a member of the squad that finished runners up at the 2017 World Rugby Under 20 Championship.

In January 2018 Brophy-Clews signed a new deal with London Irish. His last appearance came against Bath in the quarter-final of the 2020–21 European Rugby Challenge Cup. In May 2021 Brophy-Clews retired from professional rugby at the age of 24 on medical grounds due to concussion injuries.

== Honours ==
England U20

- World Rugby U20 Championship: 2016
- Six Nations Under 20s Championship: 2017

== See also ==
- List of Old Abingdonians
