= Phil Dollman =

Welsh rugby union footballer

- Born: Phil Dollman; 15 May 1985 (age 41) Caerphilly, Wales
- Height: 1.83 m (6 ft 0 in)
- Weight: 93 kg (14 st 9 lb)

Rugby union career
- Position(s): Fly half, Centre, Wing, Full-back
Amateur team(s)
Years	Team	Apps	(Points)
2000s	Caerphilly Rugby Club		
–	Bedwas Rugby Club		
Senior career
Years	Team	Apps	(Points)
2007–2009	Dragons	38	(17)
2009–2020	Exeter Chiefs	242	(137)
- Correct as of 5 October 2020
International career
Years	Team	Apps	(Points)
- Wales U-18

Phil Dollman (born 15 May 1985) is a Welsh rugby union player. Dollman was a highly versatile player who could cover multiple positions in the backline. However, he was mostly used at Exeter as a centre or fullback. Dollman signed for Exeter Chiefs in May 2009 from Dragons. He started the final and scored a try as Exeter Chiefs defeated Wasps to be crowned champions of the 2016-17 English Premiership. He intends retiring at the conclusion of the 2019–20 season.

== International ==
In May 2017 at the age of 32 he was named in the Wales senior squad for the tests against Tonga and Samoa in June 2017, following an injury to Rhun Williams. In that year's Premiership final Dollman himself suffered an injury in turn however and did not make an appearance for his country that summer.
