= William Fraser (rugby union) =

English rugby union player

Will Fraser
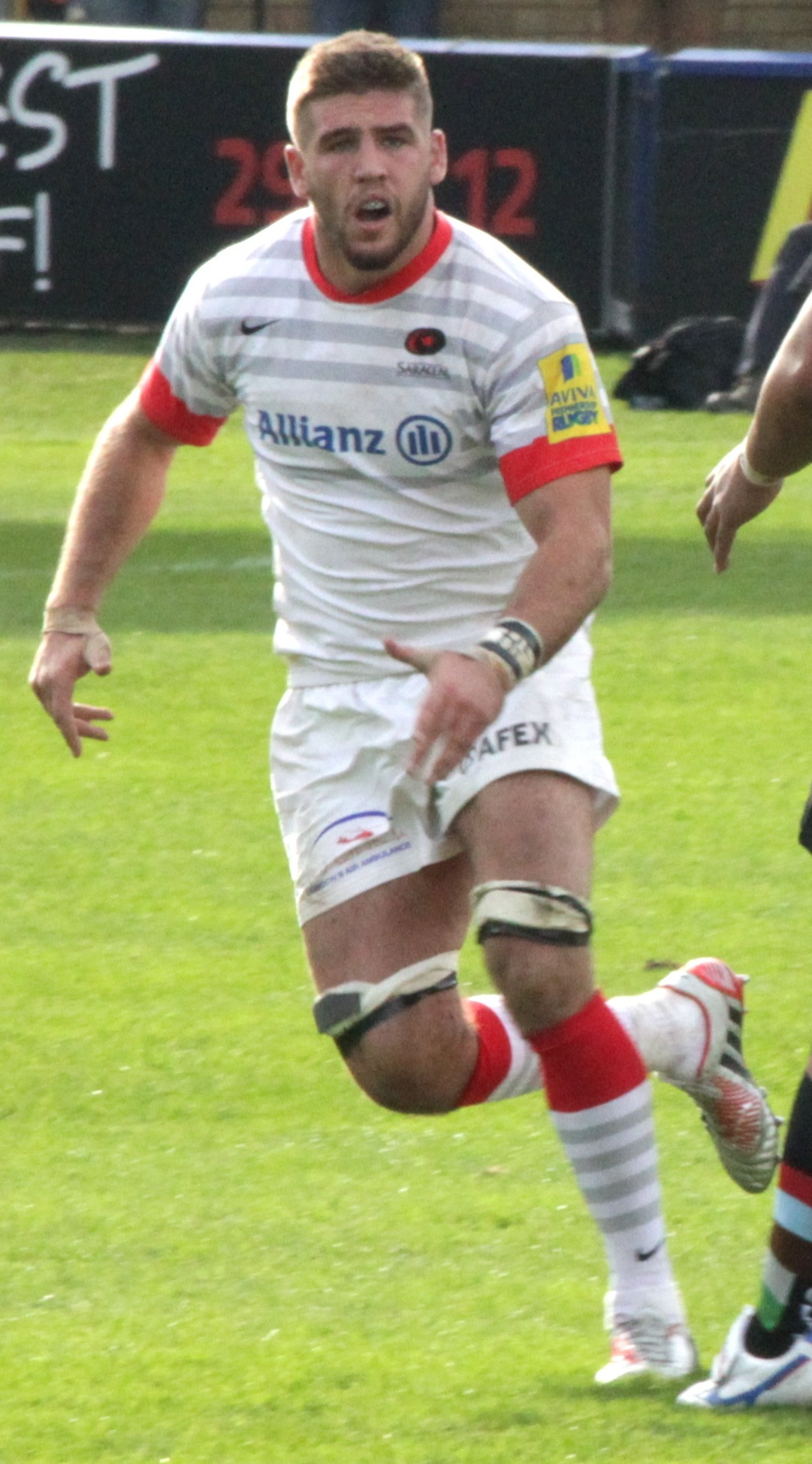
- Fraser playing for Saracens in 2012
- Born: William Edward Fraser; 29 October 1989 (age 37) Watford, England
- Height: 1.88 m (6 ft 2 in)
- Weight: 108 kg (17 st 0 lb)
- School: Berkhamsted School; Dulwich College

Rugby union career
- Position: Openside flanker
Senior career
Years	Team	Apps	(Points)
2011–2017	Saracens	59	(40)
2010–2011	→ Bedford Blues	7	(10)
- Correct as of 29 November 2013
International career
Years	Team	Apps	(Points)
2006	England U16	3	(5)
2010	England Counties	1	(5)
2013	England Saxons	2	(5)
- Correct as of 1 February 2013

William Edward "Will" Fraser (born 29 October 1989) is a retired English rugby union flanker who played for Premiership side Saracens. He had previously spent time dual registered with Bedford Blues and at international level has represented the England Saxons.

== Club career ==
Born in Watford, Fraser was educated at Berkhamsted School and Dulwich College and joined Saracens in 2005. In 2009 he spent six months with the Western Province Academy in South Africa and the following year signed on dual registration terms with Bedford Blues. He made his Bedford debut as a replacement against Doncaster Knights in September 2010, making a further five appearances over the next two months. After a six-month gap he made his last appearance for the club in the Championship play-off semi final defeat to Worcester Warriors in May 2011.

He remained dual registered with Bedford for the 2011–12 and 2012–13 seasons but did not make any appearances due to his commitments to Saracens, who he made his debut for in September 2011 as a replacement against Bath Rugby. He made a further 15 appearances during the season, including the 22–3 Heineken Cup quarter final defeat to Clermont Auvergne. Having been overpowered by the French side during the game, Fraser was among a number of Saracens players to work on his body composition and added nearly 10 kg to his frame in the following twelve months.

Fraser cemented his place in the side during the 2012–13 season and by January had accumulated more minutes on the pitch than anyone bar captain Steve Borthwick. In the same month he was among 10 players who signed extensions to their contracts with Saracens. He played 19 Premiership games and started all seven of Saracens Heineken Cup matches before tearing a tendon off the bone in his shoulder against Gloucester Rugby in April 2013. The injury ruled him out of Saracens' Premiership and Heineken Cup semi-final defeats, as well the possibility of selection for the England tour of Argentina.

He returned to the side in October 2013, six weeks earlier than expected, in a 19–12 win over London Wasps. In December, only six games into his comeback, he suffered another serious injury after being stretchered off against Sale Sharks with a suspected broken foot and damaged knee ligaments.

In the 2015–16 season Fraser helped Saracens to both the Premiership title and the European Rugby Champions Cup, and started both finals.

On 24 August 2017 Fraser was forced to retire from rugby owing to a neck injury.

== International career ==
Fraser first represented England in 2006 when he made three appearances for the under-16s including a game against the Italy under-17 A team in which he scored a try. He missed out on further age grade representation but was selected for the England Counties tour to Canada in 2010. He started the opening match against The Rock and scored a try but suffered a knee injury in the last moments of the game and was ruled out of the remainder of the tour.

In January 2013 Fraser was named in the England Saxons squad for the first time and made his debut two weeks later in the 14–10 win over the Ireland Wolfhounds, scoring a try. A week later he also started in the defeat to Scotland A and his performances saw him called into the senior England squad as injury cover for the Six Nations games against Ireland and France, though ultimately he was not included in the 23 for either match. He was tipped to travel with the England senior squad for the tour of Argentina before being ruled out through an injury sustained with Saracens.
