= Rob Vickers =

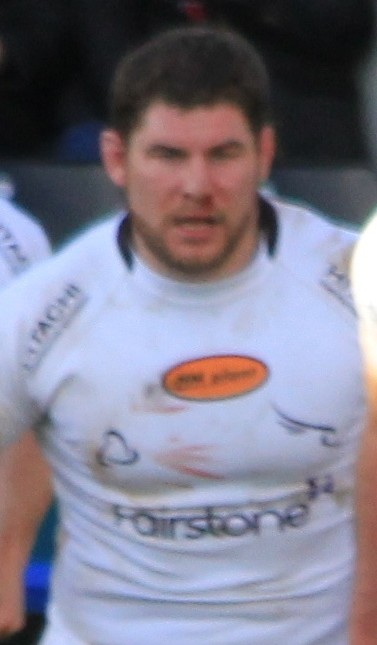
- Born: December 2, 1981 (age 44)
- Height: 1.80 m (5 ft 11 in)
- Weight: 112 kg (17 st 9 lb)

Rugby union career
Senior career
Years	Team	Apps	(Points)
2006-2019	Newcastle Falcons	250	(50)

Rob Vickers (born 2 November 1981 in Yorkshire, England) is a former rugby union player. He represented Newcastle Falcons in the Aviva Premiership, playing as a hooker.

Vickers played rugby for Durham University, graduating in 2004. He stayed on to complete a Masters in Management before commencing his rugby career.

In May 2018, after more than 250 appearances for the club, it was announced that Vickers would retire at the conclusion of the 2018 Aviva Premiership season.
