= Gerrit-Jan van Velze =

South African rugby union player

- Born: Gerrit-Jan van Velze; 21 February 1988 (age 38) Secunda, South Africa
- Height: 1.95 m (6 ft 5 in)
- Weight: 112 kg (17 st 9 lb; 247 lb)
- School: Afrikaans Boys High
- University: University of Pretoria

Rugby union career
- Position: Lock/flanker/number 8
- Current team: Bath Rugby
Senior career
Years	Team	Apps	(Points)
2008–2012	Blue Bulls	65	(50)
2012–2014	Northampton	38	(35)
2014–2021	Worcester	109	(60)
2021-2022	Tel Aviv	0	(0)
2022-present	Bath Rugby	20	(5)
- Correct as of 20 July 2022
Super Rugby
Years	Team	Apps	(Points)
2010–2012	Bulls	2	(0)
- Correct as of 12 February 2014
International career
Years	Team	Apps	(Points)
2006-2007	South Africa U19	5	(0)
2008	South Africa U20	5	(15)
- Correct as of 20 July 2022

Gerrit-Jan van Velze (born 21 February 1988) is a South African rugby union footballer. He plays for Bath Rugby in the Gallagher Premiership. He is a versatile forward and can play as a lock, flanker or number 8.

He previously played for the Bulls in Super Rugby, making his franchise debut during the 2010 Super 14 season against the Crusaders. He also made 65 appearances for the Blue Bulls in the Currie Cup and Vodacom Cup competitions.

He joined Worcester Warriors ahead of the 2014-15 English Premiership season.

He has signed for Bath Rugby ahead of the 2022-23 English Premiership season.

He retired from professional Rugby at Bath Rugby at the end of the 2023-24 English Premiership season.

He since been appointed as the Player Innovation and Performance Futures position at Bath Rugby
