= Vadim Cobîlaș =

Moldovan rugby union player (born 1983)

Vadim Cobîlaş
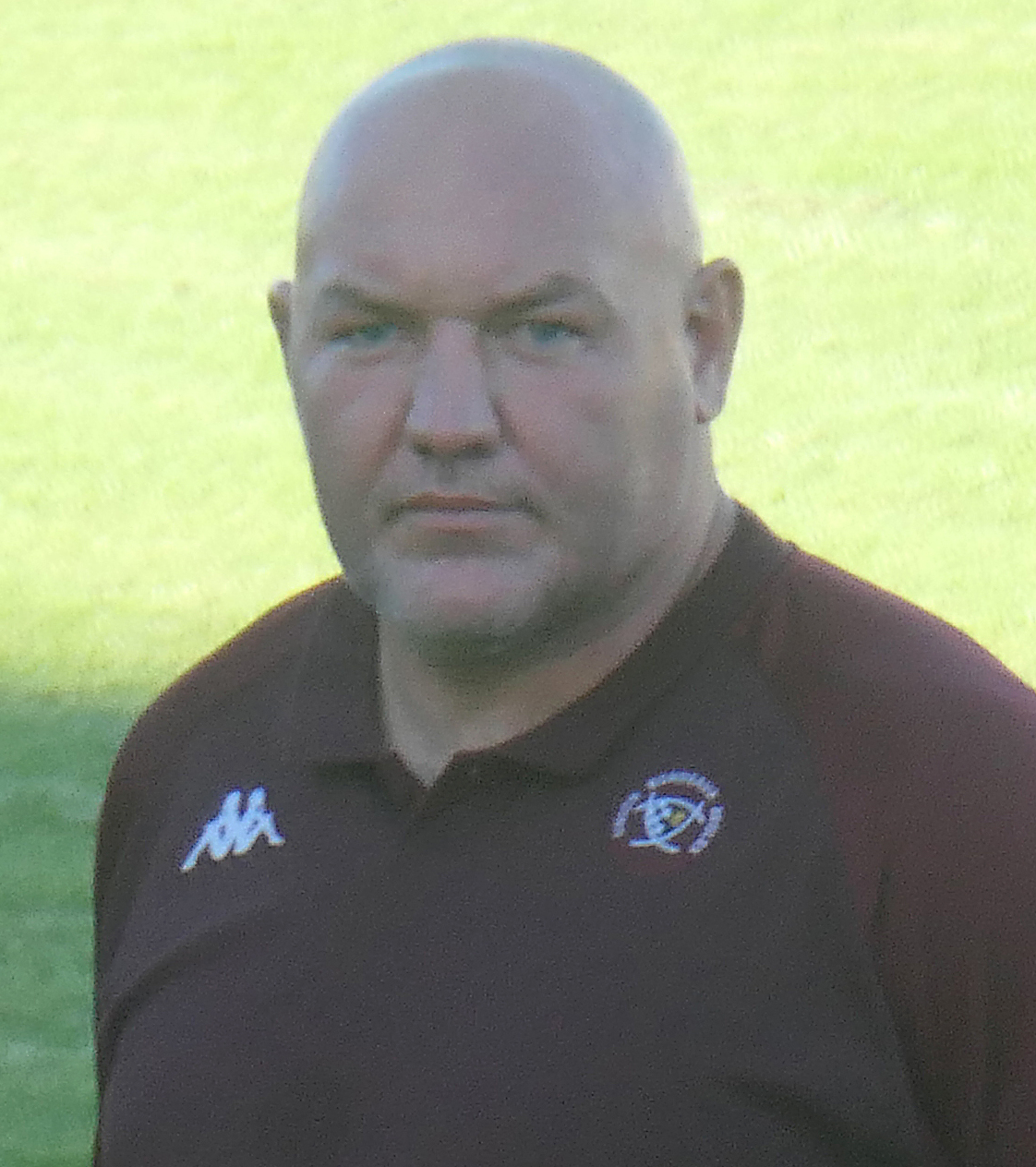
- Cobîlaş with Bordeaux Bègles in 2022
- Born: Vadim Cobîlaş; 30 July 1983 (age 43) Soroca, Moldova
- Height: 183 cm (6 ft 0 in)
- Weight: 120 kg (265 lb; 18 st 13 lb)
- Notable relative: Maxim Cobîlaș (brother)

Rugby union career
- Position: Tighthead prop
Senior career
Years	Team	Apps	(Points)
2005–2011	Monino		
2011–2016	Sale Sharks	110	(10)
2016–2023	Bordeaux Bègles	142	(5)
International career
Years	Team	Apps	(Points)
2005–2023	Moldova	45	

Vadim Cobîlaş (Romanian pronunciation: [vaˈdim kobɨˈlaʃ], born 30 July 1983) is a former Moldovan professional rugby union player who played as a tighthead prop.

== Career ==
He played for Russian side VVA-Podmoskovye Monino before signing for Sale Sharks in the Aviva Premiership in England on 2 March 2011. He is the first Moldovan rugby player to become a professional in England.

In 2016, Cobîlaş joined Bordeaux Bègles in the French Top 14.

== International career ==
Cobîlaş plays internationally for Moldova.

== Personal life ==
Vadim has a younger brother who also plays rugby called Maxim Cobîlaș who plays for VVA Podmoskovye.
