= Dave Lewis (rugby union) =

English rugby union player (born 1989)

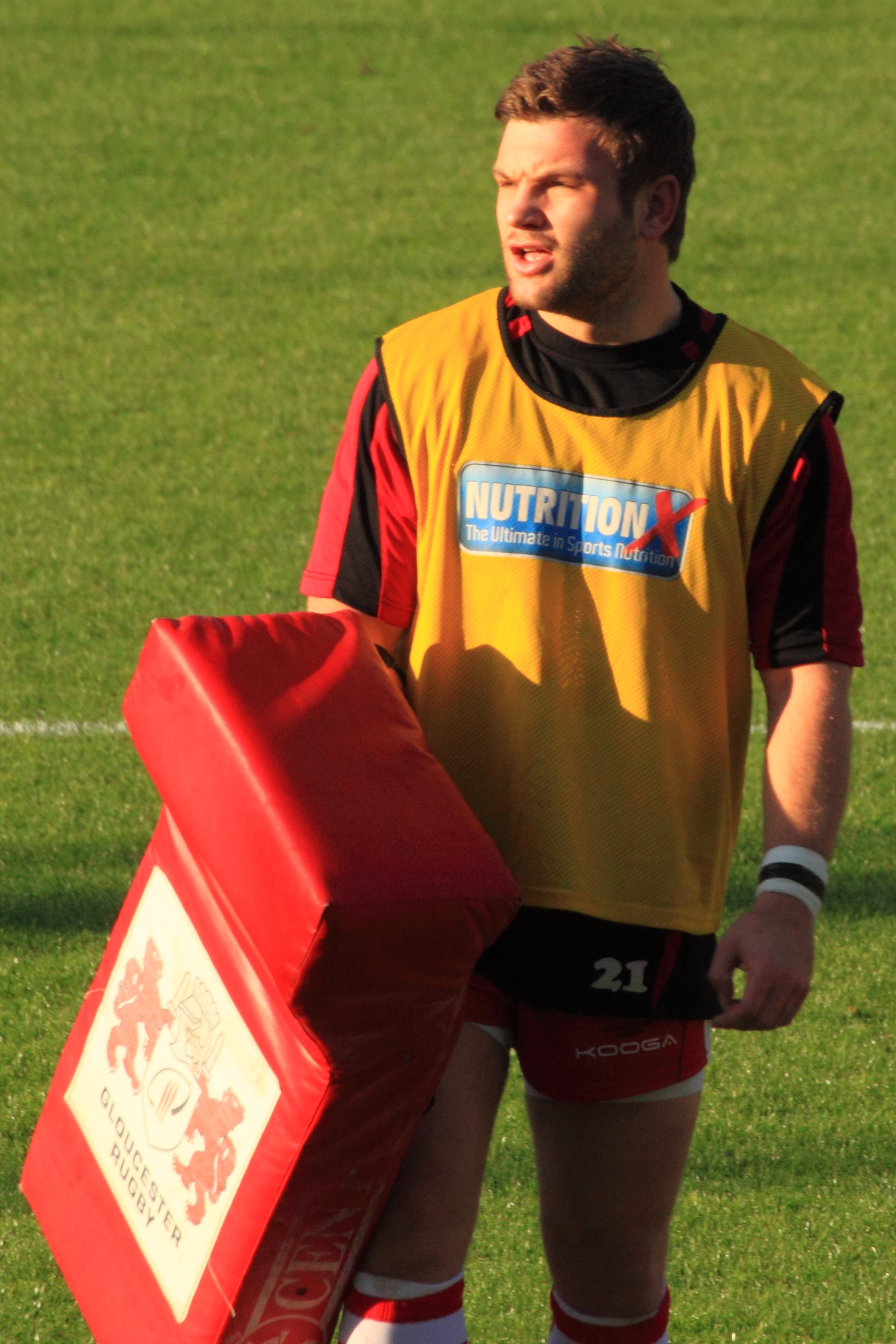
- Lewis representing Gloucester in 2011
- Born: David Ian Lewis; 29 April 1989 (age 37) Manchester, England
- Height: 1.70 m (5 ft 7 in)
- Weight: 80 kg (12 st 8 lb; 176 lb)
- School: St Michael's Tawstock; Blundell's School; Ivybridge Community College; Hartpury College

Rugby union career
- Position: Scrum-half
- Current team: Harlequins
Youth career
- Barnstaple RFC
Senior career
Years	Team	Apps	(Points)
2006-2007	Exeter Chiefs		
2007-2013	Gloucester Rugby	93	(10)
2013-2017	Exeter Chiefs		
2017–	Harlequins		
International career
Years	Team	Apps	(Points)
- England Saxons

Dave Lewis (born 29 April 1989 in Manchester) is an English rugby union footballer, currently playing in the Gallagher Premiership for Harlequins. He plays as a scrum half.

== Personal life ==
He was educated at St Michael's Tawstock, Blundell's School, Ivybridge Community College and finally at Hartpury College. Lewis grew up in Barnstaple and played for Barnstaple at youth level.

== Club career ==
Lewis was a product of the academy system at Exeter Chiefs when they were playing in the RFU Championship, Lewis joined Gloucester in 2007.

Lewis' first appearance for Gloucester was in the 07/08 season at home to Worcester when he came on for 7 minutes. His breakthrough season was the 08/09 season. He made 11 appearances and just as he was starting to establish himself in the starting line up he suffered an injury (broken leg) at home to London Irish in January. He returned to the Gloucester side for the final game of the season at London Wasps before joining up with the England under 20s for the Under 20s World Cup in Japan. From then he has been a prominent player for Gloucester but has had to battle with Rory Lawson for the scrum-half berth at Kingsholm.

It was announced on 14 February 2013 that Lewis would be rejoining Exeter Chiefs from the 2013–14 season. On 8 January 2015, Lewis signed a two-year contract extension with Exeter until the end of the 2016–17 season.

On 6 February 2017, Lewis signed for Premiership rivals Harlequins from the 2017–18 season.

== International career ==
On 25 January 2014, Lewis made his international debut for England Saxons, as a replacement, losing to Ireland Wolfhounds at 8–14.
