= David Seymour (rugby union) =

English rugby union player

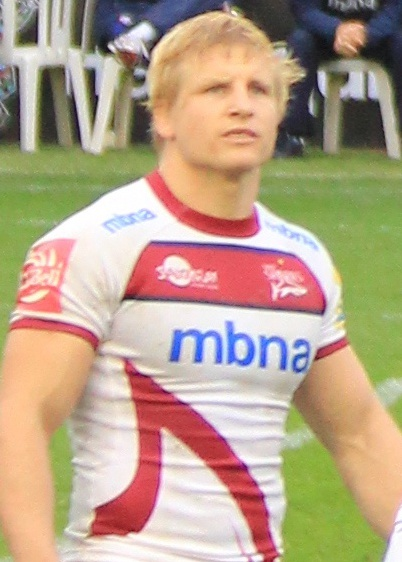
- Seymour in 2013
- Born: David Seymour; 27 September 1984 (age 42) High Wycombe, England
- Height: 1.80 m (5 ft 11 in)
- Weight: 96 kg (15 st 2 lb; 212 lb)

Rugby union career
- Position: Flanker
Youth career
- -2003: Chinnor
Senior career
Years	Team	Apps	(Points)
2003–2009	Saracens	73	(5)
2009–2018	Sale Sharks	196	(95)
2018–2019	Sale FC	26	(5)
- Correct as of 24 April 2019
International career
Years	Team	Apps	(Points)
2006–2012	England Saxons		
National sevens team
Years	Team		Comps
2006	England		Commonwealth
Medal record
Men's rugby sevens
Representing England
Commonwealth Games
Silver medal – second place	2006 Melbourne	Team competition

David Seymour (born 27 September 1984) is a retired rugby union player. A Flanker by trade, that had a successful career in the Aviva Premiership with Saracens and Sale Sharks.

Seymour joined Saracens on a full-time academy contract at the start of the 2004–05 season. But after only a few weeks of pre-season training, he was promoted to the first team squad and made his first full appearance as a replacement for Richard Hill.

He established himself as a regular in the first team and made his debut at England under-21 level in both the Six Nations and World Championships in Argentina. Further international honours have followed, Seymour having played for England 7s in the IRB Series in Dubai, Los Angeles and Hong Kong and claiming a silver medal at the 2006 Commonwealth Games in Melbourne. Seymour was called up to the England Saxons squad for the Churchill Cup in Canada.

Seymour started 13 games for Saracens in the 2007–08 season and appeared as a replacement 11 times. A knee injury at the start of the 2008–09 season restricted his appearances in the early stages of the season.

On 26 June 2009, after being released by Saracens, Sale Sharks announced that they had signed Seymour on their official website.

Seymour went on to make 196 appearances for the Sharks over nearly a decade and scored 19 tries for Sale alone. He also captained the side many times in a successful career at club level. Seymour has been retained in an ambassadorial role by Sale.

Seymour joined Sale FC Rugby for the 2018–19 season playing 26 league games and captained the side to win the Cheshire Cup against Chester RUFC in April 2019.
