= Michael Dewar (rugby union) =

Scottish rugby union player

Mike Dewar
- Born: Michael Dewar; 26 May 1997 (age 29) Oxford, England
- Height: 6 ft 0 in (1.83 m)
- Weight: 92 kg (14 st 7 lb)
- School: Abingdon School
- University: Glasgow University

Rugby union career
- Position: Flanker
Amateur team(s)
| Years | Team | Apps | (Points) |
| 2015-present | Stirling County | | |
International career
| Years | Team | Apps | (Points) |
| 2015 | Scotland U18 | 5 | (0) |

Mike Dewar (born 26 May 1997) is a Scottish rugby union player at the Flanker position.

== Biography ==
A product of Wasps Academy, Dewar began playing with Wasps from under-14 grade and then competed for them through the age grades earning four caps from Wasps 'A' side.

While at Abingdon School in Oxfordshire, Dewar was called up to the Scotland Under 18 squad and played against fellow pupil Theo Brophy Clews, who was representing England. The flanker was previously called up for the Scottish Exiles team.

He then was enlisted in the Scottish Rugby Academy in 2015 as a Stage 3 Development Player for the Glasgow district area and assigned to Glasgow Warriors.

When not involved in Warriors duty, Dewar played for amateur side Stirling County and attends Glasgow University.

== See also ==
- List of Old Abingdonians
