= Nev Edwards =

English rugby union player

Nev Edwards (born 22 November 1987 (age 38)) is an English rugby union player who plays on the wing. He has played for Sale Sharks in Premiership Rugby as well as Union Bordeaux Bègles in the French Top 14.

He attended Whitgift School on a sports scholarship, being an exciting, fast cricket bowler. There he played rugby with Danny Cipriani, and joined the London Irish academy but ended up being released after two years at 18 years old. He decided to attend St Mary's University, Twickenham and played rugby there. He then played for Rosslyn Park in National League One, the third-tier of English rugby while working a full-time sales job at Red Bull. Although here he did get a loan spell at Championship Rugby side Bedford Blues in 2013, he only played for a year. He played 727 minutes and 10 games but only scored two tries.

However, England international Danny Cipriani, who had grown up playing rugby at Rosslyn Park from under 10s with Edwards, recommended to Sale Sharks head coach, Steve Diamond, that Edwards had the ability to play at the top level and was given a three-month period to prove himself. Diamond ended up being impressed with the then 27-year olds talent so gave him a one-year deal. In total, Edwards played 25 games for Sale Sharks between 2015 and 2017, scoring 45 points for the club. England player Cipriani, and Edwards linked up well on the pitch such as Cipriani setting up an Edward try with a chip. One of his most renowned games was ironically against his old academy team, London Irish, where he scored two tries. Edwards was given a contract extension in March 2016 after scoring 8 tries in his first 9 games for Sale, but the arrival of wingers Denny Solomona and Josh Charnley meant he played less in the 2016/17 season and was released from the final year of his contract. He then joined Top 14 side, Bordeaux Bègles in July 2017. However this was only for three months (July–October) of the 2017–18 season to fill in for injured Blair Connor. This was the second time he had three months to prove himself although it turned out that they were only interested in having him for the injury replacement and nothing long term. He started and made four appearances, scoring one try. However, this was the last season of playing in a top-tier competition and as a professional rugby player. He then went back to playing amateur rugby at Rosslyn Park and Sale FC.
