= Neil Briggs =

English rugby union player

- Born: 1 June 1985 (age 41) Germany
- Height: 1.78 m (5 ft 10 in)
- Weight: 96 kg (15 st 2 lb)

Rugby union career
- Position(s): Hooker, Flanker
Senior career
Years	Team	Apps	(Points)
2004–2005	Rotherham Titans		
2005–2011	Sale Sharks	104	(30)
2011–2012	Bourgoin		
2012–2013	London Welsh	15	(0)
2013–2015	Leicester Tigers	20	(0)
2015–2017	Sale Sharks	42	(30)
2017-2018	Sale FC Rugby	18	(5)
International career
Years	Team	Apps	(Points)
2009	England Saxons		

Neil Briggs (born 1 June 1985 in Germany) is a rugby union player who most recently played for Sale Sharks.

Briggs plays as a Hooker, but he can also play as a Flanker.

Briggs started his career at Rotherham Titans before moving to Sale Sharks where he notched up 104 appearances from 2005 to 2011. In the 2005–2006 season, Briggs made 3 appearances as Sale Sharks won their first ever Premiership title. In October 2011 he left Sale to join French club Bourgoin for the remainder of the 2011–12 season before returning to the Aviva Premiership with London Welsh in 2012.

Briggs made his debut for the England Saxons against the Argentina Jaguars at the 2009 Churchill Cup.

After James Gaskell was injured in October 2010, Briggs was appointed Sale's captain for the remainder of the season. In turn, Briggs too succumbed to injury a month into his tenure as captain. The shoulder injury – which was sustained in a practice session when Briggs was tackled by Neil McMillan – sidelined him for up to three months.

For the 2013–14 season Briggs was signed by Leicester Tigers. On 30 January 2015, Briggs resigned with his old club Sale Sharks for the 2015–16 season onwards.

For the 2017-2018 Season Briggs signed for National 2 North side Sale FC Rugby.

He is currently forwards coach for sale sharks in the Gallagher Premiership.
