= Teimana Harrison =

England international rugby union player

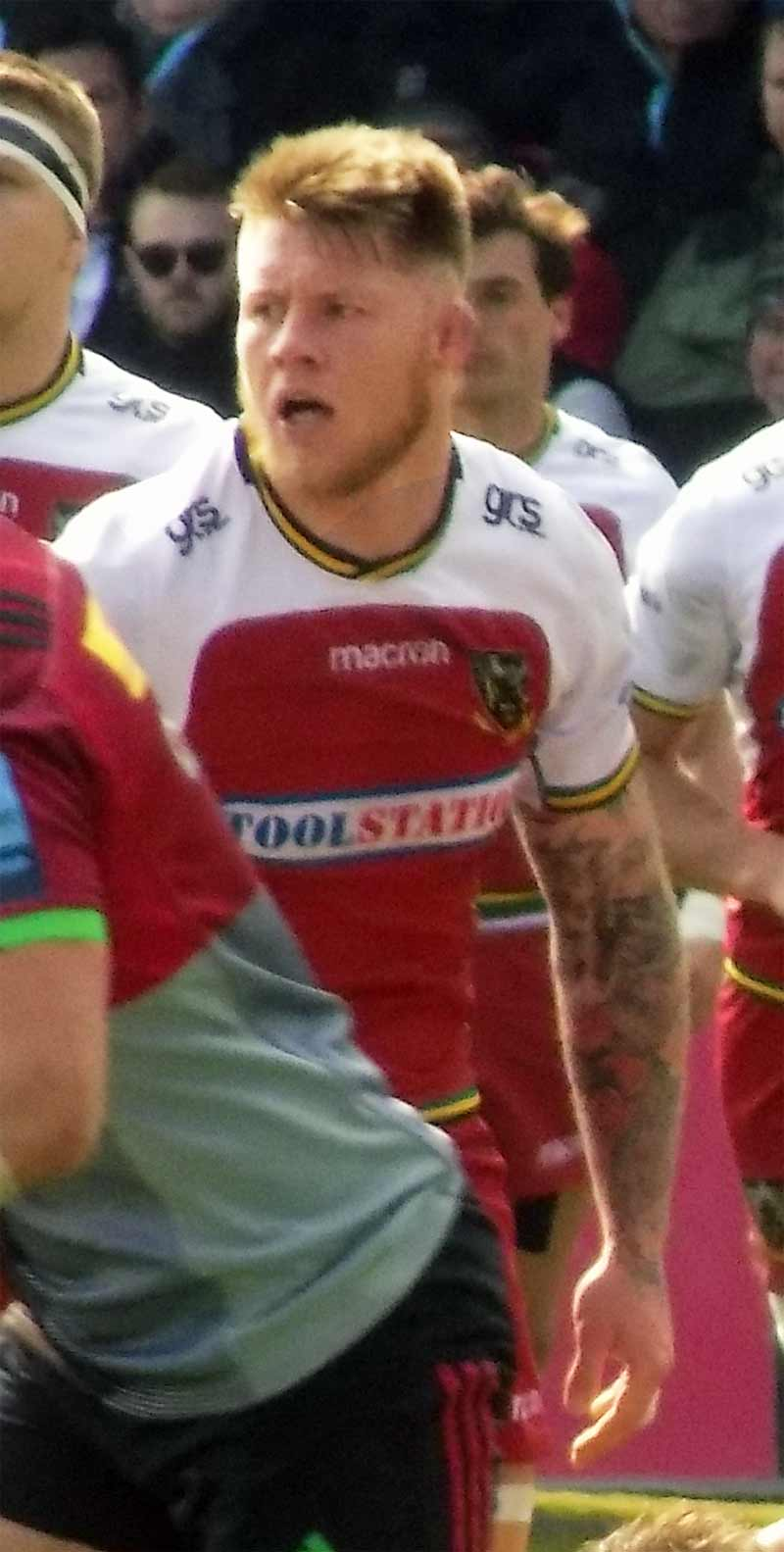
- Harrison playing for Northampton against Quins in April 2019
- Born: Teimana Harrison; 5 September 1992 (age 34) Ōpōtiki, New Zealand
- Height: 1.88 m (6 ft 2 in)
- Weight: 104 kg (16 st 5 lb; 229 lb)
- School: Rotorua Boys High School

Rugby union career
- Position(s): Flanker, Number Eight
- Current team: Provence Rugby
Senior career
Years	Team	Apps	(Points)
2012–2022	Northampton Saints	185	(130)
2022–	Provence Rugby	4	(0)
- Correct as of 21 May 2023
International career
Years	Team	Apps	(Points)
2016	England	5	(5)
- Correct as of 3 April 2018

Teimana Harrison (born 5 September 1992) is an English rugby union player, born in New Zealand, who currently plays for French Pro D2 side Provence Rugby. He plays as a back row forward.

== Club career ==
Harrison began playing rugby at a young age, like many boys in New Zealand. Among his early accolades was captaining Rotorua Boys' High School, before moving to England and joining the Northampton Saints Academy in 2011 and making his senior professional debut for the club in 2012.

Harrison was recommended to the club by the England captain Dylan Hartley in 2011.

In a season considered to be his "breakthrough year", Harrison earned both a call up to the England squad and a regular place in Saints' first team in the 2015-16 campaign..

Harrison featured heavily in Saints' fight to secure a European Rugby Champions Cup place for the 2017-18 season as they defeated both Connacht Rugby and Stade Français Paris to grab the last place.

== International career ==
Harrison received his first call up to the senior England squad by coach Eddie Jones on 8 May 2016 for a three-day training squad, and made his full England debut in a match against Wales on 29 May 2016.

Harrison was named in the 32-man England squad for the 2016 Autumn Internationals alongside fellow Northampton Saints Dylan Hartley, Courtney Lawes and Tom Wood.

=== International tries ===
As of 7 July 2019

Try	Opposing team	Location	Venue	Competition	Date	Result	Score
1	Fiji	London, England	Twickenham Stadium	2016 Autumn Internationals	19 November 2016	Win	58 – 15
