= 2019–20 European Rugby Champions Cup pool stage =

- Season: 2019–20 European Rugby Champions Cup
- Date: 15 November 2019 – 19 February 2020

Qualifiers
- Seed 1: (Ireland) Leinster
- Seed 2: (England) Exeter Chiefs
- Seed 3: (France) Toulouse
- Seed 4: (France) Clermont Auvergne
- Seed 5: (France) Racing 92
- Seed 6: (Ireland) Ulster
- Seed 7: (England) Northampton Saints
- Seed 8: (England) Saracens

The 2019–20 European Rugby Champions Cup pool stage is the first stage of the 25th season of European club rugby union, and the sixth under the European Rugby Champions Cup format. The competition involves twenty teams, across five pools of four teams, for eight quarter-final places – awarded to the five pool winners and the three top-ranked pool runners-up. The pool stage begins on the weekend of 15–17 November 2019, and will end, following 6 rounds of games, on the weekend of 18–19 February 2020.

Locations
Locations of teams of the 2019–20 European Rugby Champions Cup group stage.
Green: Pool 1; Red: Pool 2; Orange: Pool 3; Yellow: Pool 4; Blue: Pool 5.

== Seeding ==
The twenty competing teams are seeded and split into four tiers, each containing five teams.

For the purpose of creating the tiers, clubs are ranked based on their domestic league performances and on their qualification for the knockout phases of their championships, so a losing quarter-finalist in the Top 14 would be seeded below a losing semi-finalist, even if they finished above them in the regular season.

Rank	Top 14	Premiership	Pro14
1	(France) Toulouse	(England) Saracens	(Ireland) Leinster
2	(France) Clermont	(England) Exeter Chiefs	(Scotland) Glasgow Warriors
3	(France) Lyon	(England) Gloucester	(Ireland) Munster
4	(France) La Rochelle	(England) Northampton Saints	(Ireland) Ulster
5	(France) Racing	(England) Harlequins	(Ireland) Connacht
6	(France) Montpellier	(England) Bath	(Italy) Benetton
7		(England) Sale Sharks	(Wales) Ospreys

Based on these seedings, teams are placed into one of the four tiers, with the top-seeded clubs being put in Tier 1. The nature of the tier system means that a draw is needed to allocate two of the three second-seed clubs to Tier 1. The fourth-seed team from the same domestic league as the second-seed team which was put in Tier 2 will also be placed in Tier 2. Brackets show each team's seeding and their league. e.g. 1 Top 14 indicates the team was the top seed from the Top 14.

Tier 1	(England) Saracens (1 Prem)	(Ireland) Leinster (1 Pro14)	(France) Toulouse (1 Top 14)	(England) Exeter Chiefs (2 Prem)	(France) Clermont (2 Top 14)
Tier 2	(Scotland) Glasgow Warriors (2 Pro14)	(England) Gloucester (3 Prem)	(Ireland) Munster (3 Pro14)	(France) Lyon (3 Top 14)	(Ireland) Ulster (4 Pro14)
Tier 3	(England) Northampton Saints (4 Prem)	(France) La Rochelle (4 Top 14)	(England) Harlequins (5 Prem)	(Ireland) Connacht (5 Pro14)	(France) Racing (5 Top 14)
Tier 4	(England) Bath (6 Prem)	(Italy) Benetton (6 Pro14)	(France) Montpellier (6 Top 14)	(Wales) Ospreys (7 Pro14)	(England) Sale Sharks (CC)

The following restrictions will apply to the draw:

- Each pool will consist of four clubs, one from each Tier in the draw.
- Each pool must have one from each league drawn from Tier 1, 2, or 3. No pool will have a second team from the same league until the allocation of Tier 4 takes place.
- Where two Pro14 clubs compete in the same pool, they must be from different countries.

== Pool stage ==
The draw took place on 19 June 2019, in Lausanne, Switzerland.

Teams in the same pool play each other twice, at home and away, in the group stage that begins on the weekend of 15–17 November 2019, and continues through to 17–19 January 2020. The five pool winners and three best runners-up progress to the quarter-finals.

Teams are awarded group points based on match performances. Four points are awarded for a win, two points for a draw, one attacking bonus point for scoring four or more tries in a match and one defensive bonus point for losing a match by seven points or fewer.

In the event of a tie between two or more teams, the following tie-breakers are used, as directed by EPCR:

1. Where teams have played each other
  1. The club with the greater number of competition points from only matches involving tied teams.
  2. If equal, the club with the best aggregate points difference from those matches.
  3. If equal, the club that scored the most tries in those matches.
2. Where teams remain tied and/or have not played each other in the competition (i.e. are from different pools)
  1. The club with the best aggregate points difference from the pool stage.
  2. If equal, the club that scored the most tries in the pool stage.
  3. If equal, the club with the fewest players suspended in the pool stage.
  4. If equal, the drawing of lots will determine a club's ranking.

Key to colours
Winner of each pool, advance to quarter-finals.
Three second-place teams with the highest number of points advance to quarter-finals.

(Q) denotes the team has qualified for the quarter-finals as the pool winners
(q) denotes team has at least qualified for the quarter-finals as one of the three highest-scoring second-place teams

=== Pool 1 ===
Team	P	W	D	L	PF	PA	Diff	TF	TA	TB	LB	Pts
(Ireland) Leinster (1)	6	6	0	0	199	76	123	28	9	4	0	28
(England) Northampton Saints (7)	6	4	0	2	166	183	–17	19	25	3	0	19
(France) Lyon	6	1	0	5	108	141	–33	14	16	1	2	7
(Italy) Benetton	6	1	0	5	96	169	–73	12	23	1	1	6

==== Round 1 ====
16 November 2019
15:15

(1 BP) Leinster (Ireland)	33–19	(Italy) Benetton
Try: Ringrose (3) 4' m, 14' c, 68' c Sexton 43' c Kelleher 29' c Con: Sexton (3/4) 15', 31', 44'; Byrne (1/1) 69'	Report	Try: Budd 8' c Faiva 50' c Sperandio 78' m Con: Keatley (2/3) 9', 51'

RDS Arena
Attendance: 15,080
Referee: Pierre Brousset (FFR)

17 November 2019
13:00

Northampton Saints (England)	25–14	(France) Lyon
Try: Hutchinson 19' c Con: Biggar (1/1) 20'; Pen: Biggar (6/6) 3', 9', 32', 36', 42', 64'	Report	Try: Regard (2) 60' c, 73' c Con: Wisniewski (2/2) 61', 74'

Franklin's Gardens
Attendance: 12,603
Referee: Frank Murphy (IRFU)

==== Round 2 ====
23 November 2019
14:00

(2 BP) Benetton (Italy)	32–35	(England) Northampton Saints (1 BP)
Try: Faiva (2) 6' c, 69' c Ratuva Tavuyara 19' m Brex 26' c Con: Allan (3/4) 7', 27', 70'; Pen: Allan (2/2) 13', 34'	Report	Try: Collins (2) 9' m, 65' c Reinach 39' c Sleightholme 56' c Con: Biggar (3/4) 40', 56', 66'; Pen: Biggar (3/3) 3', 52', 80'+4

Stadio Comunale di Monigo
Attendance: 3,845
Referee: Mike Adamson (SRU)

23 November 2019
16:15

(1 BP) Lyon (France)	6–13	(Ireland) Leinster
Pen: Wisniewski (2/2) 66', 77'; Drop: Wisniewski (0/1)	Report	Try: Deegan 21' c Con: Sexton (1/1) 23'; Pen: Sexton (2/3) 8', 76'

Matmut Stadium de Gerland
Attendance: 15,517
Referee: Luke Pearce (RFU)

==== Round 3 ====
7 December 2019
13:00

Northampton Saints (England)	16–43	(Ireland) Leinster (1 BP)
Try: Tuala 6' c Con: Biggar (1/1) 7'; Pen: Biggar (3/3) 14', 26', 30'	Report	Try: Lowe 2' c Ruddock 15' c Porter 37' m Healy 43' m R. Byrne 46' c McGrath 75' m E. Byrne 80' c Con: Sexton (2/3) 2', 17'; R. Byrne (2/4) 45', 80'+1

Franklin's Gardens
Attendance: 13,735
Referee: Alexandre Ruiz (FFR)

7 December 2019
14:00

(1 BP) Lyon (France)	28–0	(Italy) Benetton
Try: Buttin 2' m Ngatai 7' c Mignot 27' m Gill 74' m Con: Wisniewski (1/3) 8'; Fernandez (0/1); Pen: Wisniewski (1/1) 17'; Fernandez 67' (1/1)	Report

Matmut Stadium de Gerland
Attendance: 13,446
Referee: Karl Dickson (RFU)

==== Round 4 ====
14 December 2019
13:45

Benetton (Italy)	25–22	(France) Lyon (1 BP)
Try: Sarto 8' m Ioane 13' c Lazzaroni 71' c Con: Keatley (1/2) 13'; Rizzi (1/1) 73'	Report	Try: Gill 17' c Wulf 23' c Barassi 64' m Con: Fernandez (2/2) 18', 25'; Wisniewski (0/1)

Stadio Comunale di Monigo
Attendance: 3,114
Referee: Matthew Carley (RFU)

14 December 2019
17:15

(1 BP) Leinster (Ireland)	50–21	(England) Northampton Saints
Try: Ringrose (3) 1' c, 5' c, 47' c Furlong 21' c D. Kearney 35' c Lowe 42' m Doris 66' c Con: R. Byrne (4/5) 3', 6', 22', 36'; Frawley (2/2) 48', 67'	Report	Try: Biggar 18' c Sleightholme 38' c Tuala 57' c Con: Biggar (3/3) 19', 39', 57'

Aviva Stadium
Attendance: 42,041
Referee: Daniel Jones (WRU)

==== Round 5 ====
12 January 2020
13:00

(1 BP) Leinster (Ireland)	42–14	(France) Lyon
Try: Kearney (2) 9' c, 30' c Van der Flier 13' c Deegan 53' c Cronin 64' c Porter 71' m Con: R. Byrne (5/5) 10', 14', 32', 53', 65'; Frawley (0/1)	Report	Try: Bruni 21' c Roodt 37' c Con: Pélissié (2/2) 22', 38'

RDS Arena
Attendance: 18,138
Referee: Ben Whitehouse (WRU)

12 January 2020
13:00

(1 BP) Northampton Saints (England)	33–20	(Italy) Benetton
Try: Mallinder 5' m Taylor 43' c Van Wyk 58' c Dingwall 71' c Symons 77' c Con: Grayson (4/5) 43', 59', 71', 77'	Report	Try: Benvenuti 33' c Faiva 50' c Con: Allan (2/2) 11', 64'; Pen: Allan (2/3) 34', 52'

Franklin's Gardens
Attendance: 12,770
Referee: Pierre Brousset (FFR)

==== Round 6 ====
18 January 2020
14:00

Benetton (Italy)	0–18	(Ireland) Leinster
	Report	Try: Doris 59' m Tracy 64' c Con: R. Byrne (1/2) 66'; Pen: R. Byrne (2/2) 34', 52'

Stadio Comunale di Monigo
Attendance: 3,861
Referee: Karl Dickson (RFU)

18 January 2020
14:00

Lyon (France)	24–36	(England) Northampton Saints (1 BP)
Try: Lambey 24' c Gill 32' c Ngatai 65' c Con: Wisniewski (3/3) 24', 33', 66'; Pen: Wisniewski 40'	Report	Try: Haywood 19' m Harrison 45' c Reinach 63' c Furbank 71' c Fish 77' c Con: Biggar (4/5) 45', 64', 72', 78'; Pen: Biggar (1/2) 61'

Matmut Stadium de Gerland
Attendance: 14,748
Referee: Daniel Jones (WRU)

=== Pool 2 ===
Team	P	W	D	L	PF	PA	Diff	TF	TA	TB	LB	Pts
(England) Exeter Chiefs (2)	6	5	1	0	186	105	81	25	14	5	0	27
(Scotland) Glasgow Warriors	6	3	1	2	141	115	26	17	14	2	1	17
(France) La Rochelle	6	2	0	4	107	146	–39	14	18	1	1	10
(England) Sale Sharks	6	1	0	5	92	160	–68	11	21	0	3	7

==== Round 1 ====
16 November 2019
13:00

Glasgow Warriors (Scotland)	13–7	(England) Sale Sharks (1 BP)
Try: Van der Merwe 35' c Con: Hastings (1/1) 36'; Pen: Hastings (2/3) 15', 26'	Report	Try: Oosthuizen 61' c Con: MacGinty (1/1) 62'

Scotstoun Stadium
Attendance: 7,351
Referee: Alexandre Ruiz (FFR)

16 November 2019
16:15

La Rochelle (France)	12–31	(England) Exeter Chiefs (1 BP)
Try: Doumayrou 44' m Murimurivalu 80' c Con: James (1/1) 80'+2	Report	Try: Dennis 8' c O'Flaherty 32' c Slade 53' c S. Simmonds 62' c Con: J. Simmonds (4/4) 9', 34', 54', 64'; Pen: J. Simmonds (1/1) 74'

Stade Marcel-Deflandre
Attendance: 16,000
Referee: Mike Adamson (SRU)

==== Round 2 ====
23 November 2019
15:15

(1 BP) Exeter Chiefs (England)	34–18	(Scotland) Glasgow Warriors
Try: Hill 27' c Slade 41' c S. Simmonds 52' c O'Flaherty 58' c Con: J. Simmonds (4/4) 28', 42', 54', 60'; Pen: J. Simmonds (2/2) 12', 67'	Report	Try: Grigg 8' c Turner 78' m Con: Hastings (1/2) 8'; Pen: Hastings (2/2) 32', 40'

Sandy Park
Attendance: 10,545
Referee: Pascal Gaüzère (FFR)

24 November 2019
13:00

Sale Sharks (England)	25–15	(France) La Rochelle
Try: Janse van Rensburg 6' c Penalty try 45'; Ashton 72' m Con: MacGinty (1/2) 8'; Pen: MacGinty (2/2) 31', 71'	Report	Try: Rattez 19' c Sinzelle 80'+1 m Con: James (1/2) 20'; Pen: James (1/1) 43'; Drop: James (0/1)

AJ Bell Stadium
Attendance: 6,087
Referee: Andrew Brace (IRFU)

==== Round 3 ====
7 December 2019
16:15

(1 BP) La Rochelle (France)	24–27	(Scotland) Glasgow Warriors
Try: Priso 4' c Kieft 35' m Con: Plisson (1/2) 5'; Pen: Plisson (4/4) 17', 20', 42', 53'	Report	Try: Gibbins 40' c Matawalu 50'; Steyn 63'; Con: Hastings (3/3) 40'+1, 51', 65'; Pen: Hastings (2/2) 1', 28'

Stade Marcel-Deflandre
Attendance: 15,678
Referee: Luke Pearce (RFU)

8 December 2019
15:00

(1 BP) Sale Sharks (England)	20–22	(England) Exeter Chiefs
Try: Van der Merwe (2) 20' m, 30' m Ross 74' c Con: R. du Preez (1/3) 74'; Pen: R. du Preez (1/1) 8'	Report	Try: Penalty try 13'; Hogg 14' m Cowan-Dickie 24' c Con: J. Simmonds (1/2) 25'; Pen: J. Simmonds (1/1) 19'

AJ Bell Stadium
Attendance: 11,090
Referee: Mathieu Raynal (FFR)

==== Round 4 ====
14 December 2019
17:15

(1 BP) Glasgow Warriors (Scotland)	7–12	(France) La Rochelle
Try: Brown 15'; Con: Hastings (1/1) 16'	Report	Try: Favre 21' m Botia 34' c Con: James (1/2) 35'; Pen: Balès (1/1) 64'

Scotstoun Stadium
Attendance: 6,801
Referee: Wayne Barnes (RFU)

15 December 2019
13:00

(1 BP) Exeter Chiefs (England)	35–10	(England) Sale Sharks
Try: S. Simmonds (2) 21' c, 56' c J. Simmonds 50' c Moon 70' c Nowell 72' c Con: J. Simmonds (3/3) 22', 51', 58'; Steenson (2/2) 71', 73'	Report	Try: James 61' c Con: MacGinty (1/1) 62'; Pen: MacGinty (1/1) 17'

Sandy Park
Attendance: 10,217
Referee: Pierre Brousset (FFR)

==== Round 5 ====
10 January 2020
20:45

(1 BP) La Rochelle (France)	30–23	(England) Sale Sharks (1 BP)
Try: Railevu 22' m Kerr-Barlow 25' c Doumayrou 58' c Alldritt 73' m Con: West (2/3) 27', 59'; James (0/1); Pen: West (2/4) 33', 63'	Report	Try: J. du Preez 7' c Langdon 78' c Con: MacGinty (1/1) 8'; Williams (1/1) 78'; Pen: MacGinty (2/2) 16', 29'; Williams (1/1) 40'

Stade Marcel-Deflandre
Attendance: 15,500
Referee: Mike Adamson (SRU)

11 January 2020
15:15

(1 BP) Glasgow Warriors (Scotland)	31–31	(England) Exeter Chiefs (1 BP)
Try: Seymour 0' c Jones 7' c Horne 40'; Matawalu 62'; Con: Hastings (4/4) 1', 8', 40', 64'; Pen: Hastings (1/1) 22'; Drop: Hastings (0/1)	Report	Try: White 12' c Kvesic (2) 28' c, 54' c Vermeulen 35' c Con: J. Simmonds (4/4) 13', 28', 37', 54'; Pen: J. Simmonds (1/1) 4'; Hogg (0/1)

Scotstoun Stadium
Attendance: 7,351
Referee: Romain Poite (FFR)

==== Round 6 ====
18 January 2020
17:30

(1 BP) Exeter Chiefs (England)	33–14	(France) La Rochelle
Try: Cowan-Dickie 11' c Ewers 19' c S. Simmonds (2) 46' c, 56' m Townsend 61' c Con: J. Simmonds (4/5) 12', 19', 48', 62'	Report	Try: Murimurivalu 15' c Penalty try 23'; Con: West (1/1) 16'

Sandy Park
Attendance: 12,632
Referee: Frank Murphy (IRFU)

18 January 2020
17:30

Sale Sharks (England)	7–45	(Scotland) Glasgow Warriors (1 BP)
Try: Cooper-Woolley 55' c Con: Curtis (1/1) 56'	Report	Try: Nakarawa 2' c Brown 10' c Van der Merwe 28' c Johnson 47' c Gray 64' c Turner 75' c Con: Hastings (6/6) 3', 11', 29', 48', 65', 76'; Pen: Hastings (1/1) 61'

AJ Bell Stadium
Attendance: 7,708
Referee: Pascal Gaüzère (FFR)

=== Pool 3 ===
Team	P	W	D	L	PF	PA	Diff	TF	TA	TB	LB	Pts
(France) Clermont (4)	6	5	0	1	207	114	93	24	15	3	1	24
(Ireland) Ulster (6)	6	5	0	1	129	107	22	16	10	1	0	21
(England) Harlequins	6	2	0	4	114	166	–52	13	20	0	2	10
(England) Bath	6	0	0	6	102	165	–63	12	20	1	4	5

==== Round 1 ====
16 November 2019
16:00

(1 BP) Bath (England)	16–17	(Ireland) Ulster
Try: Hamer-Webb 60' c Con: Burns (1/1) 61'; Pen: Burns (2/2) 25', 29'; Priestland (1/2) 66'	Report	Try: Cooney 13' c Lyttle 57' c Con: Cooney (2/2) 14', 58'; Pen: Cooney (1/2) 70'

The Recreation Ground
Attendance: 13,289
Referee: Manuel Bottino (FIR)

16 November 2019
18:30

(1 BP) Clermont (France)	53–21	(England) Harlequins
Try: Raka (2) 10' c, 61' c Yato (2) 17' m, 24' c Toeava 45' c Moala 69' c Tadjer 75' c Con: Parra (4/5) 11', 25', 46', 61'; Laidlaw (2/2) 70', 77'; Pen: Parra (2/2) 2', 40'	Report	Try: Lawday 28' c Elia 50' c Lang 71' c Con: Smith (3/3) 29', 51', 71'

Stade Marcel-Michelin
Attendance: 17,701
Referee: Daniel Jones (WRU)

==== Round 2 ====
22 November 2019
19:45

Ulster (Ireland)	18–13	(France) Clermont (1 BP)
Try: Murphy 17' c Cooney 62' m Con: Cooney (1/2) 18'; Pen: Cooney (2/2) 2', 36'	Report	Try: Penalty try 71'; Pen: Laidlaw (2/3) 32', 61'

Ravenhill Stadium
Attendance: 15,466
Referee: JP Doyle (RFU)

23 November 2019
17:30

Harlequins (England)	15–9	(England) Bath (1 BP)
Pen: Smith (4/4) 2', 8', 14', 49'; Lang (1/1) 74'	Report	Pen: Burns (3/3) 52', 58', 78'

Twickenham Stoop
Attendance: 13,205
Referee: Frank Murphy (IRFU)

==== Round 3 ====
6 December 2019
19:45

Bath (England)	17–34	(France) Clermont (1 BP)
Try: Priestland 12' c Joseph 75' c Con: Priestland (1/1) 13'; Burns (1/1) 75'; Pen: Priestland (1/1) 49'	Report	Try: Moala 26' c Ezeala (2) 65' c, 72' c Lapandry 67' c Con: Parra (1/1) 27'; Laidlaw (3/3) 66', 68', 73'; Pen: Laidlaw (2/3) 46', 52'; Drop: Lopez (0/1)

The Recreation Ground
Attendance: 11,700
Referee: Andrew Brace (IRFU)

7 December 2019
15:15

Ulster (Ireland)	25–24	(England) Harlequins (1 BP)
Try: Reidy 31' c McCloskey 43' m McBurney 66' c Con: Cooney (2/3) 32', 66'; Pen: Cooney (2/2) 7', 78'	Report	Try: Dombrandt 24' c Elia (2) 56' c, 59' c Con: Smith (3/3) 25', 58', 60'; Pen: Smith (1/2) 9'

Ravenhill Stadium
Attendance: 17,923
Referee: Mike Adamson (SRU)

==== Round 4 ====
13 December 2019
19:45

Harlequins (England)	10–34	(Ireland) Ulster (1 BP)
Try: Lewies 61' c Con: Lang (1/1) 62'; Pen: Lang (1/1) 34'	Report	Try: Cooney (2) 38' c, 58' c Marshall 46' c Faddes 75' m O'Toole 78' m Con: Cooney (3/4) 40', 47', 59'; Pen: Cooney (1/1) 6'

Twickenham Stoop
Attendance: 13,808
Referee: Alexandre Ruiz (FFR)

15 December 2019
16:15

(1 BP) Clermont (France)	52–26	(England) Bath (1 BP)
Try: Ulugia 3' c Penaud 7' c Raka (2) 14' c, 29' c Moala (2) 19' m, 32' c Lopez 44' m McIntyre 76' c Con: Parra (5/7) 4', 8', 15', 30', 34'; Laidlaw (1/1) 77'	Report	Try: Walker 24' c McConnochie 39' c Dunn 50' c Bayliss 71' m Con: Burns (3/4) 25', 39', 51'

Stade Marcel-Michelin
Attendance: 16,332
Referee: Ben Whitehouse (WRU)

==== Round 5 ====
10 January 2020
19:45

(1 BP) Bath (England)	19–25	(England) Harlequins
Try: Walker 5' c Hamer-Webb 38' c Willison 57' m Con: Burns (2/3) 6', 39'	Report	Try: Chisholm 11' c Ibitoye 17' m Dombrandt 54' c Con: Herron (2/3) 12', 55'; Pen: Herron (2/2) 47', 69'

The Recreation Ground
Attendance: 12,059
Referee: Pascal Gaüzère (FFR)

11 January 2020
13:00

Clermont (France)	29–13	(Ireland) Ulster
Try: Raka 48' c Moala 76' c Con: Parra (1/1) 49'; Laidlaw (1/1) 77'; Pen: Parra (3/4) 18', 40'+1, 67'; Laidlaw (1/1) 71'; Drop: Lopez (1/1) 6'	Report	Try: Cooney 7' c Con: Cooney (1/1) 8'; Pen: Cooney (2/2) 2', 64'

Stade Marcel-Michelin
Attendance: 19,004
Referee: Matthew Carley (RFU)

==== Round 6 ====
18 January 2020
15:15

(1 BP) Harlequins (England)	19–26	(France) Clermont
Try: Northmore 4' c Dombrandt 30' m Herron 56' c Con: Herron (2/3) 5', 58'	Report	Try: Betham 2' c Naqalevu 26' c Con: Parra (2/2) 3', 28'; Pen: Parra (4/5) 11', 43', 49', 55'

Twickenham Stoop
Attendance: 13,600
Referee: George Clancy (IRFU)

18 January 2020
15:15

Ulster (Ireland)	22–15	(England) Bath (1 BP)
Try: Coetzee 5' c Baloucoune 41' c Addison 47' m Con: Cooney (2/3) 6', 42'; Pen: B. Burns (1/1) 73'	Report	Try: McConnochie 18' c Batty 65' m Con: F. Burns (1/2) 19'; Pen: F. Burns (1/1) 46'

Ravenhill Stadium
Attendance: 17,682
Referee: Alexandre Ruiz (FFR)

=== Pool 4 ===
Team	P	W	D	L	PF	PA	Diff	TF	TA	TB	LB	Pts
(France) Racing 92 (5)	6	4	1	1	194	126	68	26	15	4	1	23
(England) Saracens (8)	6	4	0	2	121	88	33	13	10	1	1	18
(Ireland) Munster	6	3	1	2	124	97	27	13	10	2	0	16
(Wales) Ospreys	6	0	0	6	83	211	–128	11	28	1	1	2

==== Round 1 ====
16 November 2019
17:30

Ospreys (Wales)	13–32	(Ireland) Munster (1 BP)
Try: A. Davies 71' c Con: Price (1/1) 72'; Pen: Price (2/2) 7', 28'	Report	Try: Loughman 33' c Earls 49'; Conway 51' c J. Cronin 80'+4 c Con: Bleyendaal (3/4) 34', 52', 80'+5; Pen: Bleyendaal (2/2) 15', 19'

Liberty Stadium
Attendance: 7,295
Referee: Karl Dickson (RFU)

17 November 2019
16:15

(1 BP) Racing 92 (France)	30–10	(England) Saracens
Try: Vakatawa 9' c Thomas 25' m Russell 53' c Lauret 64' m Con: Machenaud (2/3) 10', 54'; Pen: Machenaud (2/3) 5', 20'	Report	Try: Lozowski 50' c Con: Spencer (1/1) 51'; Pen: Spencer (1/1) 24'

Paris La Défense Arena
Attendance: 20,275
Referee: Andrew Brace (IRFU)

==== Round 2 ====
23 November 2019
13:00

(1 BP) Saracens (England)	44–3	(Wales) Ospreys
Try: Singleton 20' m Segun (2) 31' m, 46' c Lewington 36' c Penalty try 61'; Barrington 65' c Con: Man. Vunipola (3/5) 37', 47', 66'; Pen: Daly (1/1) 12'; Man. Vunipola (1/1) 16'	Report	Pen: Hook (1/1) 28'

Allianz Park
Attendance: 7,531
Referee: Mathieu Raynal (FFR)

23 November 2019
17:30

Munster (Ireland)	21–21	(France) Racing 92
Try: Earls 39' m Conway 74' c Con: Hanrahan (1/2) 75'; Pen: Hanrahan (3/3) 8', 26', 46'; Drop: Hanrahan (0/1)	Report	Try: Russell 18' c Thomas 28' c Imhoff 47' c Con: Iribaren (3/3) 19', 29', 48'; Pen: Iribaren (0/1)

Thomond Park
Attendance: 25,600
Referee: Matthew Carley (RFU)

==== Round 3 ====
7 December 2019
17:30

Munster (Ireland)	10–3	(England) Saracens (1 BP)
Try: O'Mahony 30' c Con: Hanrahan (1/1) 31'; Pen: Hanrahan (1/1) 17'	Report	Pen: Spencer (1/3) 36'

Thomond Park
Attendance: 25,034
Referee: Romain Poite (FFR)

7 December 2019
17:30

Ospreys (Wales)	19–40	(France) Racing 92 (1 BP)
Try: Dirksen 7' c Fia 50' c A. Davies 57' m Con: McKenzie (2/3) 9', 51'	Report	Try: Baubigny 19' c Thomas (2) 23' c, 30' c Penalty try 28'; Tanga 45' c Chavancy 65' c Con: Machenaud (4/5) 20', 24', 31', 66'; Pen: Machenaud (0/1)

Liberty Stadium
Attendance: 5,487
Referee: Frank Murphy (IRFU)

==== Round 4 ====
13 December 2019
20:45

(1 BP) Racing 92 (France)	40–27	(Wales) Ospreys (1 BP)
Try: Dupichot 10' m Imhoff (2) 13' c, 24' c Zebo 38' c Colombe 48' c Tanga 53' c Con: Machenaud (5/6) 14', 25', 40', 50', 54'	Report	Try: Morgan 7' m Klim (2) 56' c, 77' m Price 67' m Venter 71' m Con: McKenzie (0/1); Price (1/4) 57'

Paris La Défense Arena
Attendance: 10,113
Referee: Luke Pearce (RFU)

14 December 2019
15:00

Saracens (England)	15–6	(Ireland) Munster
Try: Maitland 65' m Mak. Vunipola 71' c Con: Farrell (1/2) 72'; Pen: Farrell (1/2) 7'	Report	Pen: Hanrahan (2/3) 24', 43'

Allianz Park
Attendance: 8,500
Referee: Pascal Gaüzère (FFR)

==== Round 5 ====
11 January 2020
13:00

(1 BP) Ospreys (Wales)	15–22	(England) Saracens
Try: D. Evans (2) 33' c, 42' m Con: Price (1/2) 34'; Pen: Price (1/2) 14'	Report	Try: Lewington 50' c Con: Man. Vunipola (1/1) 51'; Pen: Man. Vunipola (4/4) 3', 16', 25', 31', 67'

Liberty Stadium
Attendance: 7,002
Referee: Alexandre Ruiz (FFR)

12 January 2020
16:15

(1 BP) Racing 92 (France)	39–22	(Ireland) Munster
Try: Thomas (2) 28' m, 71' m Vakatawa 76' c Imhoff 80' c Con: Iribaren (0/1); Machenaud (2/3) 77', 80'+2; Pen: Iribaren (3/3) 19', 32', 46'	Report	Try: Conway 37' c Con: Hanrahan (1/1) 38'; Pen: Hanrahan (4/5) 3', 17', 49', 63'

Paris La Défense Arena
Attendance: 18,000
Referee: Wayne Barnes (RFU)

==== Round 6 ====
19 January 2020
13:00

(1 BP) Munster (Ireland)	33–6	(Wales) Ospreys
Try: Stander (2) 31' c, 78' c Archer 40' c Murray 47' m Casey 59' c Con: Hanrahan (4/5) 32', 40+1', 60', 79'	Report	Pen: Price (2/2) 8', 14'

Thomond Park
Attendance: 19,891
Referee: Mathieu Raynal (FFR)

19 January 2020
13:00

Saracens (England)	27–24	(France) Racing 92 (1 BP)
Try: Itoje (2) 2' c, 49' c Mak. Vunipola 11' c Con: Farrell (3/3) 3', 13', 51'; Pen: Farrell (2/2) 19', 76'	Report	Try: Vakatawa (2) 14' c, 31' c Dupichot 27' c Con: Russell (1/1) 15'; Iribaren (2/2) 28', 32'; Pen: Iribaren (1/2) 46'

Allianz Park
Attendance: 8,500
Referee: Nigel Owens (WRU)

=== Pool 5 ===
Team	P	W	D	L	PF	PA	Diff	TF	TA	TB	LB	Pts
(France) Toulouse (3)	6	6	0	0	162	85	77	19	9	3	0	27
(England) Gloucester	6	2	0	4	140	140	0	19	14	3	3	14
(France) Montpellier	6	2	0	4	118	157	–39	12	20	1	1	10
(Ireland) Connacht	6	2	0	4	120	158	–38	15	22	1	1	10

==== Round 1 ====
15 November 2019
19:45

(1 BP) Gloucester (England)	20–25	(France) Toulouse
Try: Simpson 10' c, 20' c Con: Cipriani (2/2) 12', 20'; Pen: Cipriani (2/3) 27', 34'	Report	Try: Bézy 61' c Con: Ramos (1/1) 62'; Pen: Ntamack (1/1) 42'; Ramos (4/4) 23', 30', 51', 68'; Drop: Holmes (1/1) 2'

Kingsholm Stadium
Attendance: 11,659
Referee: Ben Whitehouse (WRU)

17 November 2019
13:00

Connacht (Ireland)	23–20	(France) Montpellier (1 BP)
Try: Boyle 37' m McCartney 40'+4 m Blade 52' c Con: Carty (1/3) 53'; Pen: Carty (1/1) 15'; C. Fitzgerald 67' (1/1)	Report	Try: Cruden 1' c Bouthier 62' c Con: Paillaugue (2/2) 1', 63'; Pen: Paillaugue (2/2) 22', 46'

Galway Sportsgrounds
Attendance: 6,229
Referee: Matthew Carley (RFU)

==== Round 2 ====
23 November 2019
14:00

(1 BP) Toulouse (France)	32–17	(Ireland) Connacht
Try: Bézy 12' c Huget 33' m Kaino 63' c Ahki 80'+1 c Con: Ramos (3/4) 14', 64', 80'+2; Pen: Ramos (2/2) 18', 60'	Report	Try: Farrell 10' c Blade 24' c Con: Fitzgerald (2/2) 11', 25'; Pen: Fitzgerald (0/1); Drop: Fitzgerald (1/1) 49'

Stade Ernest-Wallon
Attendance: 15,100
Referee: Karl Dickson (RFU)

24 November 2019
16:15

Montpellier (France)	30–27	(England) Gloucester (1 BP)
Try: Serfontein 21' c Timu 32' c Nadolo 40'+5 c Con: Paillaugue (3/3) 22', 33', 40'+ 6 Pen: Paillaugue (3/3) 13', 52', 64'	Report	Try: Braley 35' c Banahan 45' c Simpson 74' c Con: Twelvetrees (2/2) 36', 46'; Evans (1/1) 76'; Pen: Twelvetrees (2/2) 27', 59'

Altrad Stadium
Attendance: 10,302
Referee: George Clancy (IRFU)

==== Round 3 ====
8 December 2019
13:00

(1 BP) Gloucester (England)	26–17	(Ireland) Connacht
Try: Marshall (2) 3' c, 60' m Rees-Zammit 46' c Polledri 63' c Con: Cipriani (3/4) 4', 46', 64'	Report	Try: Porch 8' c Roux 80' c Con: Carty (1/1) 8'; Fitzgerald (1/1) 80'+1; Pen: Carty (1/2) 17'

Kingsholm Stadium
Attendance: 10,875
Referee: Pascal Gauzère (FFR)

8 December 2019
16:15

Toulouse (France)	23–9	(France) Montpellier
Try: Ntamack (2) 35' c, 49' c Con: Ramos (2/2) 36', 50'; Pen: Ramos (3/3) 2', 23', 69'	Report	Pen: Paillaugue (2/3) 38', 54'; Steyn (1/1) 41'

Stade Ernest-Wallon
Attendance: 16,260
Referee: Wayne Barnes (RFU)

==== Round 4 ====
14 December 2019
12:45

Connacht (Ireland)	27–24	(England) Gloucester (2 BP)
Try: Blade 29' c Delahunt 76' c Copeland 80' c Con: Fitzgerald (3/3) 30', 77', 80'+ 2 Pen: Fitzgerald (2/2) 14', 59'	Report	Try: Grobler 33' c Atkinson (2) 50' m, 68' m Ludlow 65' c Con: Twelvetrees (2/4) 34', 66'

Galway Sportsgrounds
Attendance: 6,787
Referee: Romain Poite (FFR)

14 December 2019
16:00

Montpellier (France)	18–26	(France) Toulouse (1 BP)
Try: Ouedraogo 19' c Nadolo 59' m Con: Goosen (1/2) 20'; Pen: Goosen (2/3) 28', 31'	Report	Try: Ntamack 14' c Arnold (2) 33' c, 48' c Tauzin 80' m Con: Ramos (3/4) 15', 34', 50'; Pen: Ramos (0/1)

Altrad Stadium
Attendance: 11,366
Referee: Nigel Owens (WRU)

==== Round 5 ====
11 January 2020
15:15

Connacht (Ireland)	7–21	(France) Toulouse
Try: Penalty try 10'	Report	Try: Kaino 19' c Marchand 37' c Ahki 44' c Con: Ramos (3/3) 21', 39', 46'

Galway Sportsgrounds
Attendance: 8,129
Referee: Luke Pearce (RFU)

11 January 2020
17:30

(1 BP) Gloucester (England)	29–6	(France) Montpellier
Try: Heinz 32' c Rees-Zammit 49' m B. Morgan 57' c Gleave 65' c Con: Twelvetrees (3/4) 33', 58', 66'; Pen: Twelvetrees (1/1) 41'	Report	Pen: Steyn (1/1) 20'; Darmon (1/1) 54'

Kingsholm Stadium
Attendance: 12,837
Referee: Frank Murphy (IRFU)

==== Round 6 ====
19 January 2020
16:15

(1 BP) Montpellier (France)	35–29	(Ireland) Connacht (2 BP)
Try: Chilachava 3' c N'Gandebe (2) 23' c, 28' c Reilhac (2) 52' c, 77' c Con: Pollard (5/5) 4', 24', 30', 52', 78'	Report	Try: Healy 34' c Porch 36' c Marmion 40'+1 c Godwin 43' m Con: Carty (3/4) 35', 38', 40'+ 2 Pen: Carty (1/1) 57'

Altrad Stadium
Attendance: 9,900
Referee: Matthew Carley (RFU)

19 January 2020
16:15

(1 BP) Toulouse (France)	35–14	(England) Gloucester
Try: Tekori 14' c Ntamack (2) 20' c, 33' c Marchand 51' c Baille 61' c Con: Ramos (5/5) 15', 22', 34', 53', 62'	Report	Try: Rees-Zammit 2' c Woodward 38' c Con: Twelvetrees (2/2) 3', 39'

Stade Ernest-Wallon
Attendance: 18,780
Referee: Mike Adamson (SRU)

== See also ==
- 2019–20 European Rugby Challenge Cup
