= 2020 European Rugby Champions Cup final =

2020 European Rugby Champions Cup Final
- Event: 2019–20 European Rugby Champions Cup
Exeter Chiefs	Racing 92
(England)	(France)
31	27
- Date: 17 October 2020
- Venue: Ashton Gate Stadium, Bristol
- Referee: Nigel Owens (Wales)

The 2020 European Rugby Champions Cup Final was the final match in the 2019–20 European Rugby Champions Cup, and the twenty-fifth European club rugby final in general. The final was held between first-time finalists Exeter Chiefs, and two-time runners-up Racing 92. Originally due to take place at the Stade Vélodrome in Marseille on 23 May, it was rescheduled to Ashton Gate in Bristol on 17 October due to the COVID-19 pandemic.

== Background ==
Both Exeter and Racing entered into the 2020 final with significantly little championship pedigree compared to the finalists of the previous year's final, Saracens and Leinster, as neither team had yet won the tournament. Racing had appeared in two previous finals in 2016 and 2018, losing to Saracens and Leinster respectively, while Exeter hadn't previously reached the semi-finals. Exeter entered the final undefeated with a 31–31 away draw to Glasgow Warriors while Racing also had a 21–21 away draw with Munster but also with a 27–24 away loss to Saracens.

Exeter and Racing had never met in European competitions prior to the 2020 final.

== Route to the final ==
Note: In all results below, the score of the finalist is given first (H: home; A: away).

(England) Exeter Chiefs		Round	(France) Racing 92	
Opponent	Result	Pool stage	Opponent	Result
(France) La Rochelle	31–12 (A)	Matchday 1	(England) Saracens	30–10 (H)
(Scotland) Glasgow Warriors	34–18 (H)	Matchday 2	(Ireland) Munster	21–21 (A)
(England) Sale Sharks	22–20 (A)	Matchday 3	(Wales) Ospreys	40–19 (A)
(England) Sale Sharks	35–10 (H)	Matchday 4	(Wales) Ospreys	40–17 (H)
(Scotland) Glasgow Warriors	31–31 (A)	Matchday 5	(Ireland) Munster	39–22 (H)
(France) La Rochelle	33–14 (H)	Matchday 6	(England) Saracens	24–27 (A)
Pool 2 winner: Team / P / Pts; (England) Exeter Chiefs / 6 / 27; (Scotland) Glasgow Warriors / 6 / 17; (France) La Rochelle / 6 / 10; (England) Sale Sharks / 6 / 7		Final standings	Pool 4 winner: Team / P / Pts; (France) Racing 92 / 6 / 23; (England) Saracens / 6 / 18; (Ireland) Munster / 6 / 16; (Wales) Ospreys / 6 / 2	
Opponent	Result	Knock-out stage	Opponent	Result
(England) Northampton Saints	38–15 (H)	Quarter-finals	(France) Clermont	36–27 (A)
(France) Toulouse	28–18 (H)	Semi-finals	(England) Saracens	19–15 (H)

== Match ==
=== Summary ===
Drawn into pools 2 and 4 respectively, Exeter and Racing both finished at the top of their pool. Exeter finished on 27 points, winning five matches and drawing away to Glasgow Warriors. Racing finished on 23 points, winning four matches, drawing away to Munster and suffering defeat away to Saracens in their final pool match. Exeter qualified with a No. 2 seed for the knockout stage, while Racing captured the No. 5 seed. In the knockout stage, Exeter defeated No. 7 Northampton Saints (home) and No. 3 Toulouse (home), while Racing 92 defeated No. 4 Clermont (away) and No. 8 Saracens (home) en route to the final.

In the match, Exeter raced out to a 14–0 lead with tries by Luke Cowan-Dickie and Sam Simmonds in the 8th and 16th minutes respectively, with Joe Simmonds successful on both conversions. Four minutes later, Racing got on the board via Simon Zebo, but the conversion was not successful. Racing's Juan Imhoff scored another try in the 32nd minute, with Finn Russell making the conversion. Exeter responded in the final minute of the half with a try scored by Harry Williams and a conversion by Joe Simmonds, making the halftime score 21–12 in favour of Exeter.

The second half began quickly, as Racing's Simon Zebo found the try zone in three minutes and Exeter's Henry Slade did the same two minutes later. In the 50th minute, Camille Chat narrowed Exeter's lead to one score with a try, and Maxime Machenaud's subsequent conversion narrowed the score to 28–24. Machenaud made it a one-point contest in the 65th minute by scoring Racing's only penalty of the game. The next 15 minutes were the longest scoring drought of the match, as it remained 28–27 until the game's final moments. During this time however, tensions arose when Exeter's Tomas Francis was sin binned by referee Nigel Owens for a deliberate knock-on within their own 22, however a penalty of their own for not releasing permanently put them out of danger. Joe Simmonds's stoppage time penalty goal then all but ensured an Exeter victory, by the score of 31–27.

With the victory, Exeter Chiefs won their first European Champions Cup title, while Racing 92 fell in their third final in the last five years.

=== Details ===
17 October 2020
16:45 BST (UTC+01:00)

Exeter Chiefs (England)	31–27	(France) Racing 92
Try: Cowan-Dickie 8' c S. Simmonds 16' c Williams 40'+1 c Slade 45' c Con: J. Simmonds (4/4) 9', 17', 40'+1, 46'; Pen: J. Simmonds (1/1) 80'+1	Report	Try: Zebo (2) 20' m, 43' m Imhoff 32' c Chat 50' c Con: Russell (1/2) 32'; Machenaud (1/2) 51'; Pen: Machenaud (1/1) 65'

Ashton Gate, Bristol
Referee: Nigel Owens (WRU)

Exeter	Racing 92

FB	15	(Scotland) Stuart Hogg
RW	14	(England) Jack Nowell		67' to 69'
OC	13	(England) Henry Slade
IC	12	(Ireland) Ian Whitten	(substituted off) 59'	(substituted on) 67' (substituted off) 69'
LW	11	(England) Tom O'Flaherty
FH	10	(England) Joe Simmonds (c)
SH	9	(England) Jack Maunder	(substituted off) 65'
N8	8	(England) Sam Simmonds
OF	7	(South Africa) Jacques Vermeulen	(substituted off) 56'
BF	6	(England) Dave Ewers
RL	5	(England) Jonny Hill
LL	4	(Scotland) Jonny Gray	(substituted off) 59'
TP	3	(England) Harry Williams	(substituted off) 56'
HK	2	(England) Luke Cowan-Dickie	(substituted off) 56'
LP	1	(England) Alec Hepburn	(substituted off) 56'
Substitutions:
HK	16	(England) Jack Yeandle	(substituted on) 56'
PR	17	(England) Ben Moon	(substituted on) 56'
PR	18	(Wales) Tomas Francis	(substituted on) 56'	(yellow card) 71' to end'
LK	19	(Scotland) Sam Skinner	(substituted on) 59'
FL	20	(South Africa) Jannes Kirsten	(substituted on) 56'
SH	21	(Scotland) Sam Hidalgo-Clyne	(substituted on) 65'
FH	22	(Ireland) Gareth Steenson
CE	23	(England) Ollie Devoto	(substituted on) 59'
Coach:
(England) Rob Baxter

FB	15	(Ireland) Simon Zebo	(substituted off) 65'
RW	14	(France) Louis Dupichot
OC	13	(France) Virimi Vakatawa
IC	12	(France) Henry Chavancy (c)
LW	11	(Argentina) Juan Imhoff
FH	10	(Scotland) Finn Russell
SH	9	(France) Teddy Iribaren	(substituted off) 40'
N8	8	(France) Antonie Claassen	(substituted off) 76'
OF	7	(France) Fabien Sanconnie
BF	6	(France) Wenceslas Lauret
RL	5	(New Zealand) Dominic Bird
LL	4	(France) Bernard Le Roux	(substituted off) 67'
TP	3	(France) Georges-Henri Colombe	(substituted off) 51'
HK	2	(France) Camille Chat	(substituted off) 51'
LP	1	(France) Eddy Ben Arous	(substituted off) 76'
Substitutions:
HK	16	(France) Teddy Baubigny	(substituted on) 51'
PR	17	(France) Hassane Kolingar	(substituted on) 76'
PR	18	(France) Ali Oz	(substituted on) 51'
LK	19	(Ireland) Donnacha Ryan	(substituted on) 67'
FL	20	(France) Boris Palu	(substituted on) 76'
SH	21	(France) Maxime Machenaud	(substituted on) 40'
FH	22	(France) Olivier Klemenczak
CE	23	(Australia) Kurtley Beale	(substituted on) 65'
Coach:
(France) Laurent Travers

Touch judges:
Mike Adamson (SRU)
Craig Evans (WRU)
Television Match Official:
Ian Davies (WRU)
