= Harry Williams (rugby union) =

English rugby union player (born 1991)

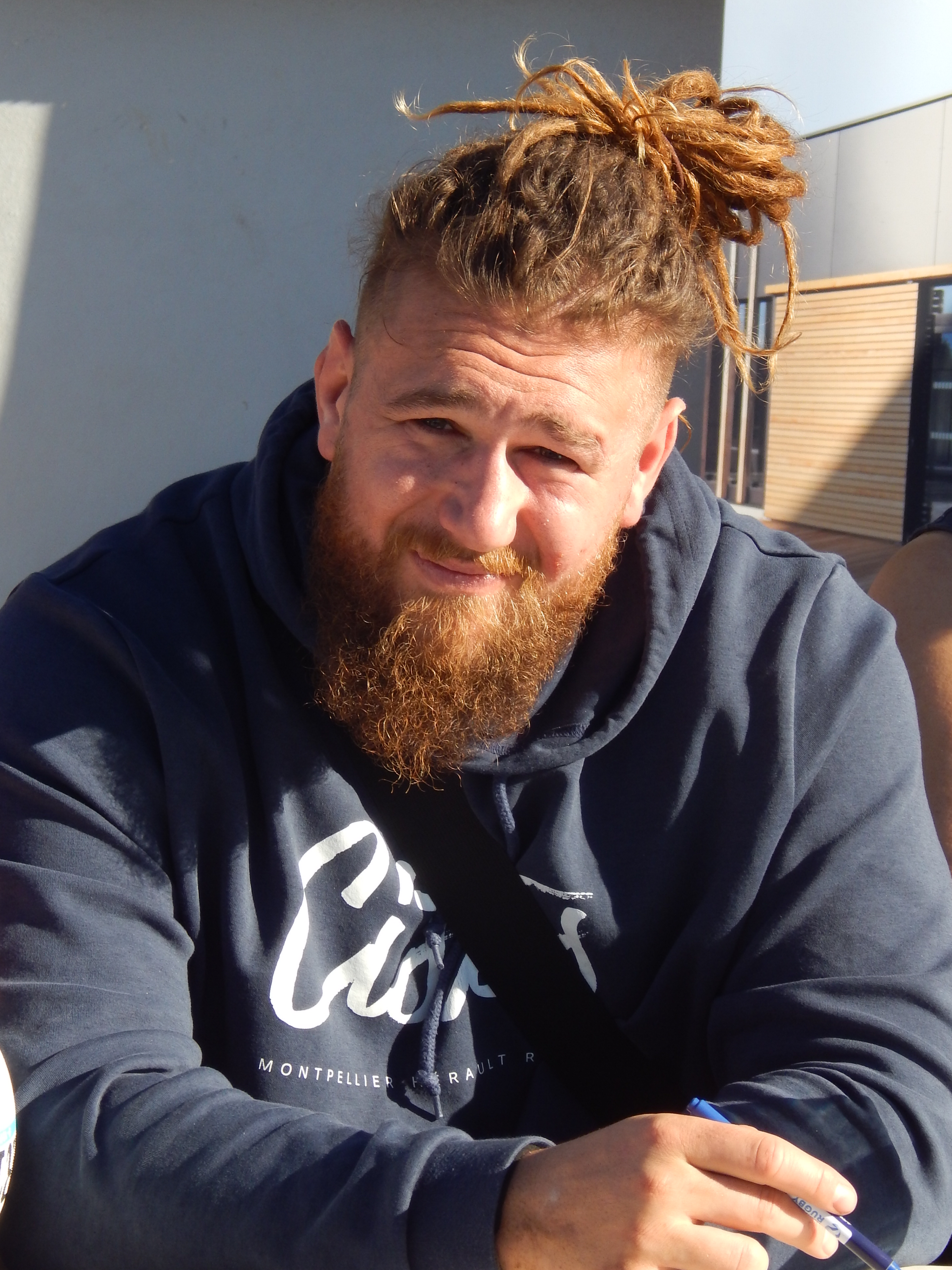
- Williams in 2024
- Born: Harry Anthony Hall Williams; 1 October 1991 (age 35) London, England
- Height: 1.89 m (6 ft 2 in)
- Weight: 132 kg (20 st 11 lb; 291 lb)
- School: Whitgift School

Rugby union career
- Position: Tighthead Prop
Amateur team(s)
Years	Team	Apps	(Points)
2011–2013	Loughborough Students	49	(20)
Senior career
Years	Team	Apps	(Points)
2013	London Wasps	2	(0)
2013–2014	Nottingham	20	(0)
2014–2015	Jersey Reds	20	(5)
2015–2023	Exeter Chiefs	163	(90)
2023–2024	Montpellier	13	(0)
2024–2025	Pau	5	(0)
2025–	Harlequins		
- Correct as of 14 October 2024
International career
Years	Team	Apps	(Points)
2017–2021	England	19	(0)
- Correct as of 6 February 2021

Harry Anthony Hall Williams (born 1 October 1991) is an English international rugby union player. He plays as a tighthead prop for Harlequins. Williams previously played for London Wasps, Nottingham, Jersey Reds, Exeter Chiefs, Montpellier and Pau. At International level, Williams made his England debut against Argentina on 10 June 2017.

== Biography ==
=== Early life and education ===
Harry Williams was born on 1 October 1991 in London, England and raised in Crystal Palace. His father worked as a bricklayer, while his mother was a landscape gardener. Williams began his rugby journey at Old Elthamians RFC. He later attended Whitgift School, where he played alongside future England internationals Elliot Daly, Marland Yarde, and George Merrick.

Following his school years, Williams spent seven months living in northern Auckland, New Zealand, where he played rugby for North Shore Rugby Football Club while working part-time as a bakery cleaner. Upon returning to England, he continued his rugby career while studying at Loughborough University from 2011 to 2013.

In 2012, he joined the London Wasps academy but failed to break into the first team. He spent only one season there, playing just two matches in the Anglo-Welsh Cup in 2013.

=== Early career in the Championship (2013-2015) ===
After his unsuccessful stint with the Wasps, Harry Williams joined Nottingham in the RFU Championship. He played twelve league matches in one year. A season after arriving at Nottingham, Harry Williams joined the Jersey Reds in 2014, where he also stayed for only one season. At the end of that season, he was named to the Championship's Team of the Year, recognizing his excellent performances. He believes that his time at Jersey significantly aided his development as many emerging front row players, such as Sam Lockwood or Richard Barrington had passed through the Jersey Reds before joining major clubs (Newcastle Falcons and Saracens). In 2015, he was scouted by Rob Baxter at the Exeter Chiefs who signed him and started his Premiership career.

=== Highest level with Exeter Chiefs and England (2015–2023) ===
In April 2015, Harry Williams left Jersey for Exeter as he wanted to play at the highest level with an ambitious club. At 24, he quickly established himself as a key player in his new team during his first season in the Premiership Rugby. On 9 April 2016 he scored his first try for Exeter against Wasps in the European Rugby Champions Cup. That season, Exeter reached the 2015–16 Premiership Rugby final, lost against Saracens. In the final, Williams started and played for 47 minutes, but his team lost 28–20.

The following season 2016–17, Williams played in 27 matches across all competitions, helping Exeter reach both the championship final and the Premiership Rugby Cup final. In the premiership final, Exeter defeated Wasps 23–20, claiming their first title in history. Williams was a starter, playing for 50 minutes and celebrating the first title of his career, although he did not participate in the 2016–17 Anglo-Welsh Cup final against Leicester, which they lost.

In May 2017, with many English players selected for the 2017 British & Irish Lions tour to New Zealand, head coach Eddie Jones called up seventeen new players to fill the gaps for the England tour of Argentina. On 10 June 2017 Williams made his Test debut starting in a 38–34 win over Los Pumas. He played an hour before being replaced by fellow debutant Will Collier. Williams also started the second test as England won the series. He was retained for the end-of-year tests and featured in a victory over Australia.

After three international tests in November 2017, he was selected in January 2018 to compete in the Six Nations Championship, during which he played in three matches against Italy, Wales, and Scotland. At 20 st 11 lbs (132 kg), he was the heaviest player competing in the tournament. Harry Williams then participated in four international tests of the 2018 tour of South Africa and featured off the bench in all three tests as England lost the series 2–1, before playing in the 2019 Six Nations Championship. After the tournament, he was selected for the national team in July 2019 to prepare for the 2019 Rugby World Cup. He played a friendly against Wales in preparation but was not included in the World Cup squad, as Eddie Jones opted for Kyle Sinckler and Dan Cole in his position.

Over the next two seasons, Williams maintained his regular playing time and reached the Premiership Rugby final for the third and fourth consecutive times. While he missed the 2018 final, he was a starter in the 2019 final.

In the 2019–20 season, Williams played 26 matches across all competitions, starting each time. In March 2020, Exeter announced he had extended his contract for at least two more years. That season, Exeter initially reached the 2020 European Rugby Champions Cup final, where Williams started and scored the third of the team's four tries in a 31–27 victory against Racing 92, marking the club's first European Cup title. A week later he also started in the premiership final as they defeated Wasps to complete a League and European double.

In 2020–21, Exeter reached the Premiership Rugby final for the sixth consecutive time, facing Harlequins. In this match, Williams was a starter in the front row alongside Alec Hepburn and Luke Cowan-Dickie. Unfortunately, his team lost narrowly, with a final score of 38–40. In March 2021, he was called up again to represent England, participating in the 2021 Six Nations Championship.

During the 2022–23 Premiership Rugby season, he sustained a serious injury to his left knee in a championship match against Harlequins in March 2023, bringing his season to an early end.

=== Move to Montpellier and Pau (2023–2025) ===
After eight successful seasons with Exeter Chiefs, Harry Williams moved to France ahead of the 2023–2024 season, joining Montpellier Hérault Rugby. There, he reunited with his former Exeter teammate, Sam Simmonds, and stepped in to replace Mohamed Haouas, who had transferred to Biarritz Olympique. Williams made his debut on 2 December 2023 at Stade Jean-Dauger, entering the game as a substitute for Titi Lamositele in the 53rd minute against Aviron Bayonnais. Over the course of the season, he featured in nine Top 14 matches and four Challenge Cup games, making a solid impact at his new club.

On 19 July 2024 Williams signed with Section Paloise on a one-year contract, with an option to extend for a further season. He was brought in to provide cover for the injured Siate Tokolahi. At Pau, he reunited with his former Exeter teammate Joe Simmonds, Sam Simmonds' younger brother. Williams made his debut on 14 September 2024 at Stade du Hameau, starting in the Bearn-Basque derby during Pau's 51–29 bonus-point victory over Aviron Bayonnais in the 2024–25 Top 14.

=== Harlequins (2025–) ===
In April 2025, he signed with Premiership club Harlequins ahead of the following season.

== Personal life ==
Williams resided in Aylesbeare in Devon and his interests include baking and electronic music. His younger sister Matilda has represented Great Britain at Water polo.

== Honours ==
Exeter Chiefs

- European Rugby Champions Cup: 2019–2020
- Premiership: 2016–2017, 2019–2020
