= Ben Moon (rugby union) =

England international rugby union player

- Born: Benjamin Moon; 14 July 1989 (age 37) Tiverton, Devon, England
- Height: 1.80 m (5 ft 11 in)
- Weight: 110 kg (17 st 5 lb; 240 lb)
- School: Uffculme School
- Occupation: Former professional rugby union player

Rugby union career
- Position: Prop
Senior career
Years	Team	Apps	(Points)
2008–2023	Exeter Chiefs	302	(55)
International career
Years	Team	Apps	(Points)
- England U16
- England U18
2009	England U20	10	(0)
2018–2019	England	8	(0)
- Correct as of 16 March 2019

Ben Moon (born 14 July 1989) is an English former rugby union player. A prop, he was a one-club man with Exeter Chiefs and made eight appearances at international level for England.

== Club career ==
Moon made his debut for Exeter on 4 October 2008 against Sedgley Park. The following season Exeter defeated Bristol Bears in the 2009–10 RFU Championship playoff final to secure promotion to the top flight.

Moon played for the side that beat Northampton Saints in the 2014 Anglo-Welsh Cup final to win Exeter the first major trophy in their history. He started in the 2016-17 Premiership final which saw Exeter Chiefs defeat Wasps after extra time to become champions of England for the first time.

Moon came off the bench as a substitute during the 2020 European Rugby Champions Cup final as Exeter beat Racing 92 to become champions of Europe for the first time in their history. The following week he played against Wasps in the Premiership final which Exeter won to complete a league and European double.

In April 2023 it was announced that Moon would retire having spent fifteen years at Exeter making over 300 appearances.

== International career ==
Moon represented England at under-16 and under-18 level. He played for England U20 during the 2009 Six Nations Under 20s Championship. Later that year Moon was a member of the squad at the 2009 IRB Junior World Championship and started in the final which England lost against New Zealand to finish runners up.

In September 2018 Moon was invited to a training camp with the senior England squad by coach Eddie Jones after a number of injury withdrawals. On 3 November 2018, Moon made his international Test debut coming on as a second half replacement for Alec Hepburn in an Autumn International game against South Africa.

A week after his debut Moon made his first start for England in a defeat to New Zealand. He then played in their next two autumn victories against Japan and Australia.

Moon was included in the England squad for the 2019 Six Nations Championship. He made his first Six Nations appearance in a victory over France. He started in the next game which they lost against Wales and also played in the penultimate round against Italy. Moon then started in the final round of the tournament which saw England draw with Scotland to finish runners up. This draw proved to be his eight and ultimately last cap.

== Honours ==
Exeter Chiefs

- European Rugby Champions Cup: 2019–20
- Premiership Rugby: 2016–17, 2019–20
- Anglo-Welsh Cup: 2013–14
- RFU Championship: 2009–10
