= 2019–20 European Rugby Champions Cup =

Rugby competition

Tournament details
- Countries: England; France; Ireland; Italy; Scotland; Wales
- Tournament format(s): Round-robin and knockout
- Date: 15 November 2019 – 17 October 2020

Tournament statistics
- Teams: 20
- Matches played: 60
- Attendance: 779,079 (12,985 per match)
- Highest attendance: 42,041 - Leinster v Northampton Saints; 14 December 2019
- Lowest attendance: 3,114 - Benetton v Lyon; 14 December 2019
- Tries scored: 333 (5.55 per match)
- Top point scorer(s): (England) Joe Simmonds (Exeter Chiefs); 95 points
- Top try scorer(s): (England) Sam Simmonds (Exeter Chiefs); 8 tries

Final
- Venue: Ashton Gate, Bristol
- Champions: (England) Exeter Chiefs (1st title)
- Runners-up: (France) Racing 92

The 2019–20 European Rugby Champions Cup (known as the Heineken Champions Cup for sponsorship reasons) was the sixth season of the European Rugby Champions Cup, the annual club rugby union competition run by European Professional Club Rugby (ECPR) for teams from the top six nations in European rugby. It was the 25th season of pan-European professional club rugby competition.

The tournament began on 15 November 2019. The knock-out stage of the tournament was rescheduled from April and May to September and October 2020 due to the COVID-19 pandemic, with the final, originally scheduled for 23 May 2020 at the Stade Vélodrome in Marseille in France, taking place on 17 October 2020 at Ashton Gate in Bristol.

== Teams ==
Twenty clubs from the three major European domestic and regional leagues competed in the Champions Cup. Nineteen of these qualified directly as a result of their league performance. The final place was awarded in the following order:

1. 2018–19 Champions Cup winner, if not already qualified. Saracens have qualified through their league position.
2. 2018–19 Challenge Cup winner, if not already qualified. Clermont have qualified through their league position.
3. 2018–19 Challenge Cup losing finalist, if not already qualified. La Rochelle have qualified through their league position.
4. 2018–19 Challenge Cup losing semi-finalist if not already qualified, or the winner of a play-off between both losing semi-finalists if neither have already qualified. As Harlequins have qualified through their league position, Sale Sharks took this place.
5. Highest ranked non-qualified club by virtue of league position from the same league as the 2018–19 Champions Cup winner. This step will not be needed, as a team will have qualified via one of the previous steps.

The distribution of teams is:

- England: seven clubs
  - The top six clubs in the English Premiership
  - Sale Sharks also qualified as Challenge Cup losing semi-finalists because Saracens, Clermont, La Rochelle, and Harlequins all qualified through their league positions
- France: six clubs
  - The top six clubs in the Top 14
- Ireland, Italy, Scotland, Wales: seven clubs
  - The top three sides (not including the South African sides, which are ineligible for European competition) in both conferences in the Pro14
  - The next best-placed eligible team in each conference will compete in a one-off play-off game to determine the 7th Pro14 team.

The following teams qualified for the tournament.

Gallagher Premiership	Top 14	Guinness Pro14			
England	France	Ireland	Italy	Scotland	Wales
Bath; Exeter Chiefs; Gloucester; Harlequins; Northampton Saints; Sale Sharks; Saracens	Clermont; Lyon; Montpellier; Racing; La Rochelle; Toulouse	Connacht; Leinster; Munster; Ulster	Benetton	Glasgow Warriors	Ospreys

=== Team details ===
Below is the list of coaches, captain and stadiums with their method of qualification for each team.

Note: Placing shown in brackets, denotes standing at the end of the regular season for their respective leagues, with their end of season positioning shown through CH for Champions, RU for Runner-up, SF for losing Semi-finalist, QF for losing Quarter-finalist, and PO for the Pro14 7th place play-off winner.

Team	Coach / Director of Rugby	Captain	Stadium	Capacity	Method of qualification
(England) Bath	(England) Stuart Hooper	(England) Matt Garvey	Recreation Ground	14,509	English Premiership top 6 (6th)
(Italy) Benetton	(New Zealand) Kieran Crowley	(Italy) Dean Budd	Stadio Comunale di Monigo	6,700	Pro14 Conference B (3rd) (QF)
(France) Clermont	(France) Franck Azéma	(France) Morgan Parra	Stade Marcel-Michelin	19,022	Top 14 top 6 (2nd) (RU)
(Ireland) Connacht	(Australia) Andy Friend	(Australia) Jarrad Butler	Galway Sportsgrounds	8,129	Pro14 Conference A (3rd) (QF)
(England) Exeter Chiefs	(England) Rob Baxter	(England) Jack Yeandle	Sandy Park	13,593 (Note: Sandy Park's capacity increased from 12,921 to 13,593 from December 2019 onward.)	English Premiership top 6 (1st) (RU)
(Scotland) Glasgow Warriors	(New Zealand) Dave Rennie	(Scotland) Ryan Wilson (New Zealand) Callum Gibbins	Scotstoun Stadium	7,351	Pro14 Conference A (1st) (RU)
(England) Gloucester	(England) George Skivington (Note: Skivington replaced Johan Ackermann as head coach in July 2020. Simultaneously, DoR David Humphreys also left the club.)	(England) Willi Heinz	Kingsholm Stadium	16,115	English Premiership top 6 (4th) (SF)
(England) Harlequins	(England) Paul Gustard	(England) Chris Robshaw	Twickenham Stoop	14,800	English Premiership top 6 (5th)
(France) La Rochelle	(New Zealand) Jono Gibbes	(New Zealand) Victor Vito	Stade Marcel-Deflandre	16,000	Top 14 top 6 (5th) (SF)
(Ireland) Leinster	(Ireland) Leo Cullen	(Ireland) Johnny Sexton	RDS Arena; Aviva Stadium	18,500; 51,700	Pro14 Conference A (1st) (CH)
(France) Lyon	(France) Pierre Mignoni	(France) Baptiste Couilloud (France) Félix Lambey	Matmut Stadium de Gerland	25,000	Top 14 top 6 (3rd) (SF)
(France) Montpellier	(France) Xavier Garbajosa	(France) Fulgence Ouedraogo	Altrad Stadium	15,697	Top 14 top 6 (6th) (QF)
(Ireland) Munster	(South Africa) Johann van Graan	(Ireland) Peter O'Mahony	Thomond Park	25,600	Pro14 Conference A (2nd) (SF)
(England) Northampton Saints	(New Zealand) Chris Boyd	(England) Teimana Harrison (England) Alex Waller	Franklin's Gardens	15,200	English Premiership top 6 (4th) (SF)
(Wales) Ospreys	(Ireland) Allen Clarke	(Wales) Justin Tipuric	Liberty Stadium	20,827	Pro14 Conference A (4th) (PO)
(France) Racing 92	(France) Laurent Travers	(France) Henry Chavancy	Paris La Défense Arena	30,681	Top 14 top 6 (4th) (QF)
(England) Sale Sharks	(England) Steve Diamond	(South Africa) Jono Ross	AJ Bell Stadium	12,000	European Challenge Cup (SF)
(England) Saracens	(Ireland) Mark McCall	(England) Brad Barritt	Allianz Park	8,500	English Premiership top 6 (2nd) (CH)
(France) Toulouse	(France) Ugo Mola	(France) Julien Marchand	Stade Ernest-Wallon	19,500	Top 14 top 6 (1st) (CH)
(Ireland) Ulster	(England) Dan McFarland	(Ireland) Iain Henderson	Ravenhill Stadium	18,196	Pro14 Conference B (2nd) (SF)

== Seeding ==
The twenty competing teams are seeded and split into four tiers, each containing five teams.

For the purpose of creating the tiers, clubs are ranked based on their domestic league performances and on their qualification for the knockout phases of their championships, so a losing quarter-finalist in the Top 14 would be seeded below a losing semi-finalist, even if they finished above them in the regular season.

Rank	Top 14	Premiership	Pro14
1	(France) Toulouse	(England) Saracens	(Ireland) Leinster
2	(France) Clermont	(England) Exeter Chiefs	(Scotland) Glasgow Warriors
3	(France) Lyon	(England) Gloucester	(Ireland) Munster
4	(France) La Rochelle	(England) Northampton Saints	(Ireland) Ulster
5	(France) Racing	(England) Harlequins	(Ireland) Connacht
6	(France) Montpellier	(England) Bath	(Italy) Benetton
7		(England) Sale Sharks	(Wales) Ospreys

Based on these seedings, teams are placed into one of the four tiers, with the top-seeded clubs being put in Tier 1. The nature of the tier system means that a draw is needed to allocate two of the three second-seed clubs to Tier 1. The fourth-seed team from the same domestic league as the second-seed team which was put in Tier 2 will also be placed in Tier 2. Brackets show each team's seeding and their league. e.g. 1 Top 14 indicates the team was the top seed from the Top 14.

Tier 1	(England) Saracens (1 Prem)	(Ireland) Leinster (1 Pro14)	(France) Toulouse (1 Top 14)	(England) Exeter Chiefs (2 Prem)	(France) Clermont (2 Top 14)
Tier 2	(Scotland) Glasgow Warriors (2 Pro14)	(England) Gloucester (3 Prem)	(Ireland) Munster (3 Pro14)	(France) Lyon (3 Top 14)	(Ireland) Ulster (4 Pro14)
Tier 3	(England) Northampton Saints (4 Prem)	(France) La Rochelle (4 Top 14)	(England) Harlequins (5 Prem)	(Ireland) Connacht (5 Pro14)	(France) Racing (5 Top 14)
Tier 4	(England) Bath (6 Prem)	(Italy) Benetton (6 Pro14)	(France) Montpellier (6 Top 14)	(Wales) Ospreys (7 Pro14)	(England) Sale Sharks (CC)

The following restrictions will apply to the draw:

- Each pool will consist of four clubs, one from each Tier in the draw.
- Each pool must have one from each league drawn from Tier 1, 2, or 3. No pool will have a second team from the same league until the allocation of Tier 4 takes place.
- Where two Pro14 clubs compete in the same pool, they must be from different countries.

== Pool stage ==
Locations
Locations of teams of the 2019–20 European Rugby Champions Cup group stage.
Green: Pool 1; Red: Pool 2; Orange: Pool 3; Yellow: Pool 4; Blue: Pool 5.

The draw took place on 19 June 2019, in Lausanne, Switzerland.

Teams in the same pool play each other twice, at home and away, in the group stage that begins on the weekend of 15–17 November 2019, and continues through to 17–19 January 2020. The five pool winners and three best runners-up progress to the quarter finals.

Teams are awarded group points based on match performances. Four points are awarded for a win, two points for a draw, one attacking bonus point for scoring four or more tries in a match and one defensive bonus point for losing a match by seven points or fewer.

In the event of a tie between two or more teams, the following tie-breakers are used, as directed by EPCR:

1. Where teams have played each other
  1. The club with the greater number of competition points from only matches involving tied teams.
  2. If equal, the club with the best aggregate points difference from those matches.
  3. If equal, the club that scored the most tries in those matches.
2. Where teams remain tied and/or have not played each other in the competition (i.e. are from different pools)
  1. The club with the best aggregate points difference from the pool stage.
  2. If equal, the club that scored the most tries in the pool stage.
  3. If equal, the club with the fewest players suspended in the pool stage.
  4. If equal, the drawing of lots will determine a club's ranking.

Key to colours
Winner of each pool, advance to quarter-finals.
Three second-place teams with the highest number of points advance to quarter-finals.

=== Pool 1 ===
Team	P	W	D	L	PF	PA	Diff	TF	TA	TB	LB	Pts
(Ireland) Leinster (1)	6	6	0	0	199	76	123	28	9	4	0	28
(England) Northampton Saints (7)	6	4	0	2	166	183	–17	19	25	3	0	19
(France) Lyon	6	1	0	5	108	141	–33	14	16	1	2	7
(Italy) Benetton	6	1	0	5	96	169	–73	12	23	1	1	6

=== Pool 2 ===
Team	P	W	D	L	PF	PA	Diff	TF	TA	TB	LB	Pts
(England) Exeter Chiefs (2)	6	5	1	0	186	105	81	25	14	5	0	27
(Scotland) Glasgow Warriors	6	3	1	2	141	115	26	17	14	2	1	17
(France) La Rochelle	6	2	0	4	107	146	–39	14	18	1	1	10
(England) Sale Sharks	6	1	0	5	92	160	–68	11	21	0	3	7

=== Pool 3 ===
Team	P	W	D	L	PF	PA	Diff	TF	TA	TB	LB	Pts
(France) Clermont (4)	6	5	0	1	207	114	93	24	15	3	1	24
(Ireland) Ulster (6)	6	5	0	1	129	107	22	16	10	1	0	21
(England) Harlequins	6	2	0	4	114	166	–52	13	20	0	2	10
(England) Bath	6	0	0	6	102	165	–63	12	20	1	4	5

=== Pool 4 ===
Team	P	W	D	L	PF	PA	Diff	TF	TA	TB	LB	Pts
(France) Racing 92 (5)	6	4	1	1	194	126	68	26	15	4	1	23
(England) Saracens (8)	6	4	0	2	121	88	33	13	10	1	1	18
(Ireland) Munster	6	3	1	2	124	97	27	13	10	2	0	16
(Wales) Ospreys	6	0	0	6	83	211	–128	11	28	1	1	2

=== Pool 5 ===
Team	P	W	D	L	PF	PA	Diff	TF	TA	TB	LB	Pts
(France) Toulouse (3)	6	6	0	0	162	85	77	19	9	3	0	27
(England) Gloucester	6	2	0	4	140	140	0	19	14	3	3	14
(France) Montpellier	6	2	0	4	118	157	–39	12	20	1	1	10
(Ireland) Connacht	6	2	0	4	120	158	–38	15	22	1	1	10

=== Ranking of pool leaders and runners-up ===
Rank	Pool leaders	Pts	Diff	TF
1	(Ireland) Leinster	28	123	28
2	(England) Exeter Chiefs	27	81	25
3	(France) Toulouse	27	77	19
4	(France) Clermont	24	93	24
5	(France) Racing 92	23	68	26
Rank	Pool runners–up	Pts	Diff	TF
6	(Ireland) Ulster	21	22	16
7	(England) Northampton Saints	19	–17	19
8	(England) Saracens	18	33	13
9	(Scotland) Glasgow Warriors	17	26	17
10	(Ireland) Munster	16	27	13

== Knock-out stage ==
=== Bracket ===
Quarter-finals
4	(France) Clermont	27
5	(France) Racing 92	36
1	(Ireland) Leinster	17
8	(England) Saracens	25
2	(England) Exeter Chiefs	38
7	(England) Northampton Saints	15
3	(France) Toulouse	36
6	(Ireland) Ulster	8

Semi-finals
5	(France) Racing 92	19
8	(England) Saracens	15
2	(England) Exeter Chiefs	28
3	(France) Toulouse	18

Final
5	(France) Racing 92	27
2	(England) Exeter Chiefs	31

=== Quarter-finals ===
19 September 2020
15:00

Leinster (Ireland) (1)	17–25	(8) (England) Saracens
Try: Porter 48' c Larmour 61' c Con: Sexton (2/2) 49', 63'; Pen: Sexton (1/1) 5'	Report	Try: Goode 36' c Con: Goode (1/1) 38'; Pen: Goode (3/4) 2', 8', 10', 79'; Daly (2/4) 24', 27'

Aviva Stadium
Referee: Pascal Gaüzère (FFR)

19 September 2020
18:45

Clermont (France) (4)	27–36	(5) (France) Racing 92
Try: Falgoux 22' m Fofana 60' c Matsushima 70' c Penaud 77' m Con: Lopez (2/4) 61', 70'; Pen: Lopez (1/1) 31'	Report	Try: Dupichot 3' m Trinh-Duc 39' c Con: Iribaren (1/2) 40'; Pen: Iribaren (6/6) 8', 12', 29', 35', 54', 58'; Machenaud (2/2) 64', 74'

Stade Marcel-Michelin
Referee: Romain Poite (FFR)

20 September 2020
13:30

Toulouse (France) (3)	36–8	(6) (Ireland) Ulster
Try: Kolbe (2) 2' m, 39' c Dupont 50' c Ramos 66' c Ahki 61' c Con: Ramos (4/5) 40'+1, 52', 63', 69'; Pen: Ramos (1/2) 14'	Report	Try: Cooney 72' m Pen: Cooney (1/1) 26'

Stade Ernest-Wallon
Referee: Wayne Barnes (RFU)

20 September 2020
17:30

Exeter Chiefs (England) (2)	38–15	(7) (England) Northampton Saints
Try: Maunder 17' c Vermeulen (2) 25' c, 77' c Nowell 42' c J. Hill 54' c Con: J. Simmonds (4/4) 17', 26', 43', 55'; Steenson (1/1) 79'; Pen: J. Simmonds (1/1) 61'	Report	Try: Harrison 37' c Dingwall 57' m Con: Biggar (1/2) 38'; Pen: Biggar (1/1) 7'

Sandy Park
Referee: Matthew Carley (RFU)

=== Semi-finals ===
26 September 2020
14:00

Racing 92 (France) (5)	19–15	(8) (England) Saracens
Try: Imhoff 76' c Con: Machenaud (1/1) 77'; Pen: Iribaren (3/4) 11', 32', 40'+1; Machenaud (1/1) 68'	Report	Pen: Goode (5/5) 24', 30', 43', 47', 53'

Paris La Défense Arena
Attendance: 1,000
Referee: Nigel Owens (WRU)

26 September 2020
15:30

Exeter Chiefs (England) (2)	28–18	(3) (France) Toulouse
Try: Williams (2) 31' c, 60' c S. Simmonds 40' c J. Simmonds 70' c Con: J. Simmonds (4/4) 32', 40'+1, 61', 71'	Report	Try: Placines 36' m Lebel 76' c Con: Ramos (1/2) 76'; Pen: Ramos (2/3) 5', 14'

Sandy Park
Attendance: 0
Referee: Andrew Brace (IRFU)

=== Final ===
17 October 2020
16:45

Exeter Chiefs (England) (2)	31–27	(5) (France) Racing 92
Try: Cowan-Dickie 8' c S. Simmonds 16' c Williams 40'+1 c Slade 45' c Con: J. Simmonds (4/4) 9', 17', 40'+1, 46'; Pen: J. Simmonds (1/1) 80'+1	Report	Try: Zebo (2) 20' m, 43', m Imhoff 32' c Chat 50' c Con: Russell (1/2) 32'; Machenaud (1/2) 51'; Pen: Machenaud (1/1) 65'

Ashton Gate, Bristol
Referee: Nigel Owens (WRU)

== Player scoring ==
- Appearance figures also include coming on as substitutes (unused substitutes not included).

=== Most points ===
Rank	Player	Team	Apps	Points
1	(England) Joe Simmonds	Exeter Chiefs	8	95
2	(Ireland) John Cooney	Ulster	6	71
3	(Wales) Dan Biggar	Northampton Saints	5	68
4	(France) Thomas Ramos	Toulouse	6	61
5	(Scotland) Adam Hastings	Glasgow Warriors	6	56
6	(France) Morgan Parra	Clermont	6	53
7	(Ireland) JJ Hanrahan	Munster	5	44
8	(Ireland) Ross Byrne	Leinster	6	37
9	(England) Freddie Burns	Bath	6	34
10	(France) Maxime Machenaud	Racing 92	5	32

=== Most tries ===
Rank	Player	Team	Apps	Tries
1	(France) Teddy Thomas	Racing 92	4	6
1	(England) Sam Simmonds	Exeter Chiefs	5	6
1	(Ireland) Garry Ringrose	Leinster	6	6
2	(New Zealand) George Moala	Clermont	5	5
2	(France) Alivereti Raka	Clermont	5	5
2	(Ireland) John Cooney	Ulster	6	5
2	(France) Romain Ntamack	Toulouse	6	5
3	(New Zealand) Hame Faiva	Benetton	6	4
3	(Argentina) Juan Imhoff	Racing 92	6	4
3	(France) Virimi Vakatawa	Racing 92	6	4

== Season records ==
=== Team ===
Largest home win – 41 points

44–3 Saracens at home to Ospreys on 23 November 2019

Largest away win – 38 points

45–7 Glasgow Warriors away to Sale Sharks on 18 January 2020

Most points scored – 53 points

53–21 Clermont at home to Harlequins on 16 November 2019

Most tries in a match – 8

Clermont at home to Bath on 15 December 2019

Most conversions in a match – 6 (4)

Clermont at home to Harlequins on 16 November 2019
Leinster at home to Northampton Saints on 14 December 2019
Clermont at home to Bath on 15 December 2019
Glasgow Warriors away to Sale Sharks on 18 January 2020

Most penalties in a match – 6

Northampton Saints at home to Lyon on 17 November 2019

Most drop goals in a match – 1 (3)

Toulouse away to Gloucester on 15 November 2019
Connacht away to Toulouse on 23 November 2019
Clermont at home to Ulster on 11 January 2020

=== Player ===
Most points in a match – 20

(Wales) Dan Biggar for Northampton Saints at home to Lyon on 17 November 2019

Most tries in a match – 3 (2)

(Ireland) Garry Ringrose for Leinster at home to Benetton on 16 November 2019
(Ireland) Garry Ringrose for Leinster at home to Northampton Saints on 14 December 2019

Most conversions in a match – 6

(Scotland) Adam Hastings for Glasgow Warriors away to Sale Sharks on 18 January 2020

Most penalties in a match – 6

(Wales) Dan Biggar for Northampton Saints at home to Lyon on 17 November 2019

Most drop goals in a match – 1 (3)

(Australia) Zack Holmes for Toulouse away to Gloucester on 15 November 2019
(Ireland) Conor Fitzgerald for Connacht away to Toulouse on 23 November 2019
(France) Camille Lopez for Clermont at home to Ulster on 11 January 2020

=== Attendances ===
Highest – 42,041

Leinster at home to Northampton Saints on 14 December 2019

Lowest – 3,114

Benetton at home to Lyon on 14 December 2019

Highest average attendance — 25,086

Leinster

Lowest average attendance — 3,607

Benetton

== See also ==
- 2019–20 European Rugby Challenge Cup
