= Gillotts School =

Coordinates: 51.5252°N 0.9216°W

Location
- Gillotts Lane; Henley-on-Thames, Oxfordshire, RG9 1PS; England

Information
- Type: Academy
- Motto: Non Nobis Solum (Not by Ourselves Alone)
- Established: 1950
- Department for Education URN: 137921 Tables
- Head teacher: Mark Bedford
- Gender: Coeducational
- Age: 11 to 16
- Enrolment: 801 as of October 2014
- Colours: navy, green
- Website: www.gillotts.org.uk

Gillotts School is a coeducational secondary school with academy status in Henley-on-Thames, Oxfordshire, England. The school is sited on a 33-acre verdant campus on the edge of Henley, incorporating a large Victorian manor house and two of its associated cottages. There are extensive playing fields, as well as areas of grass, trees and woodland.

== History ==
Gillotts was established as a girls' boarding school in parkland on the fringe of Henley-on-Thames in 1950, under founding headmistress Bede (Betty) Barford. Gillotts became a coeducational comprehensive school in 1960. The current headteacher is Mark Bedford, former headteachers include Catharine Darnton, Malcolm White, and David H W Grubb as well as Mr Lockyer.

== Alumni ==
- Julia Crouch, Governor of Anguilla
- Oliver Dench, actor
- Alec Hepburn, rugby union rugby player
- Simon Kernick, crime novelist
- Peter Rippon, broadcasting executive
- Marcus du Sautoy, Simonyi Professor for the Public Understanding of Science and a professor of mathematics at the University of Oxford
