= Alec Hepburn =

Scotland international rugby union player

- Born: Alec William Hepburn; 30 March 1993 (age 33) Perth, Australia
- Height: 1.85 m (6 ft 1 in)
- Weight: 114 kg (17 st 13 lb; 251 lb)
- School: Gillotts School; Henley College

Rugby union career
- Position: Loosehead Prop
- Current team: Scarlets
Youth career
- Henley Hawks
Senior career
Years	Team	Apps	(Points)
2013–2014	London Welsh	17	(0)
2015–2024	Exeter Chiefs	180	(35)
2024–	Scarlets	32	(5)
- Correct as of 16 July 2024
International career
Years	Team	Apps	(Points)
2012–2013	England U20	15	(0)
2016	England A	2	(5)
2018	England	6	(0)
2024–	Scotland	6	(0)
2026	Scotland 'A'	1	(0)

Alec William Hepburn (born 30 March 1993) is an Australian born, Scotland international rugby union player who plays as a loosehead prop for United Rugby Championship club Scarlets.

== Early life ==
Hepburn was born in Perth, Australia to a Scottish born father. When he was a child, his family moved to Hopetoun, a small town on the south coast of Western Australia. In 2006 at the age of thirteen he moved with his father to England where he attended Gillotts School and excelled at rugby union after taking up the sport.

== Club career ==
Hepburn played for local club Henley Hawks and then joined the academy of Wasps RFC. He spent the 2013–14 RFU Championship campaign on loan at London Welsh. In 2014 Hepburn requested that Wasps coach Dai Young release him from his club contract and he returned to his native Perth in an attempt to pursue a Super Rugby career. He joined local team Cottesloe and also represented Perth Spirit in the National Rugby Championship.

In January 2015, Hepburn joined Exeter Chiefs. He was part of the side that lost to Saracens in the final of the 2015–16 Premiership. The following season saw Exeter win their first league title although he was absent from the final due to injury.

Hepburn started in the 2020 European Rugby Champions Cup final as Exeter overcame Racing 92 to become champions of Europe for the first time in their history. The following weekend saw him also start in the Premiership final as Wasps were defeated to complete a League and European double.

After almost a decade at Exeter it was announced that Hepburn would join Scarlets for the 2024–25 United Rugby Championship.

== International career ==
=== England ===
Hepburn qualified to represent England on residency grounds having moved to the country at the age of thirteen. He was a member of the England under-20 squad that won the 2012 Six Nations. The following year saw him start for the team that defeated Wales U20 in the final of the 2013 Junior World Cup as England became youth world champions for the first time. In the summer of 2016 Hepburn scored a try for England A in a tour game against South Africa A.

In January 2018 Hepburn was named in the senior England squad by coach Eddie Jones for the 2018 Six Nations Championship. On 4 February 2018 he made his Test debut coming on as a replacement for Mako Vunipola in the opening round against Italy. He also featured as a substitute in their next game against Wales.

Hepburn was a member of the 2018 tour of South Africa but did not play in any of the games featuring only as an unused substitute in the Dead rubber third test as England lost the series 2-1. Later that year he started in an Autumn international match against South Africa. He also played in the following games against New Zealand and Japan. Their final fixture of the year on 24 November 2018 saw Hepburn make his sixth and last appearance for England in a victory over the nation of his birth Australia.

=== Scotland ===
In January 2024 Hepburn was named in the Scotland squad for the 2024 Six Nations Championship. He qualifies through his Scottish born father. On 3 February 2024 he made his debut for Scotland as a second-half substitute in their opening round victory against Wales at the Millennium Stadium.

He played for Scotland 'A' on 6 February 2026 in their match against Italy XV.

== Honours ==
Exeter

- 1× European Rugby Champions Cup: 2019–2020
- 2× Premiership: 2016–2017, 2019–2020
