= Luke Price =

Welsh rugby union player

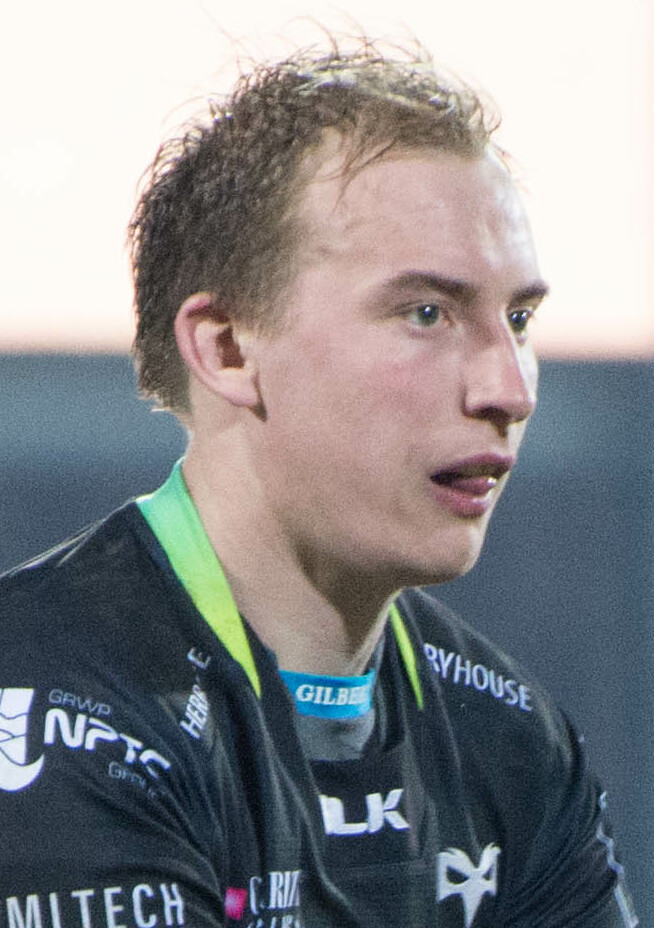
- Full name: Luke Price
- Born: 26 September 1995 (age 31) Neath, Wales
- Height: 178 cm (5 ft 10 in)
- Weight: 86 kg (13 st 8 lb; 190 lb)
- School: Neath Port Talbot College

Rugby union career
- Position: Fly-half
- Current team: Ospreys
Senior career
Years	Team	Apps	(Points)
2012-	Ospreys	25	(75)
International career
Years	Team	Apps	(Points)
–	Wales U20		

Luke Price (born 26 September 1995) is a Welsh rugby union player who plays for Ospreys as a fly-half. He is a Wales under-20 international.

Price made his debut for the Ospreys in 2012 having previously played for the Ospreys academy Aberavon RFC, Neath RFC, Swansea RFC and Bridgend Ravens.
