= Henry Slade (rugby union) =

England international rugby union player (born 1993)

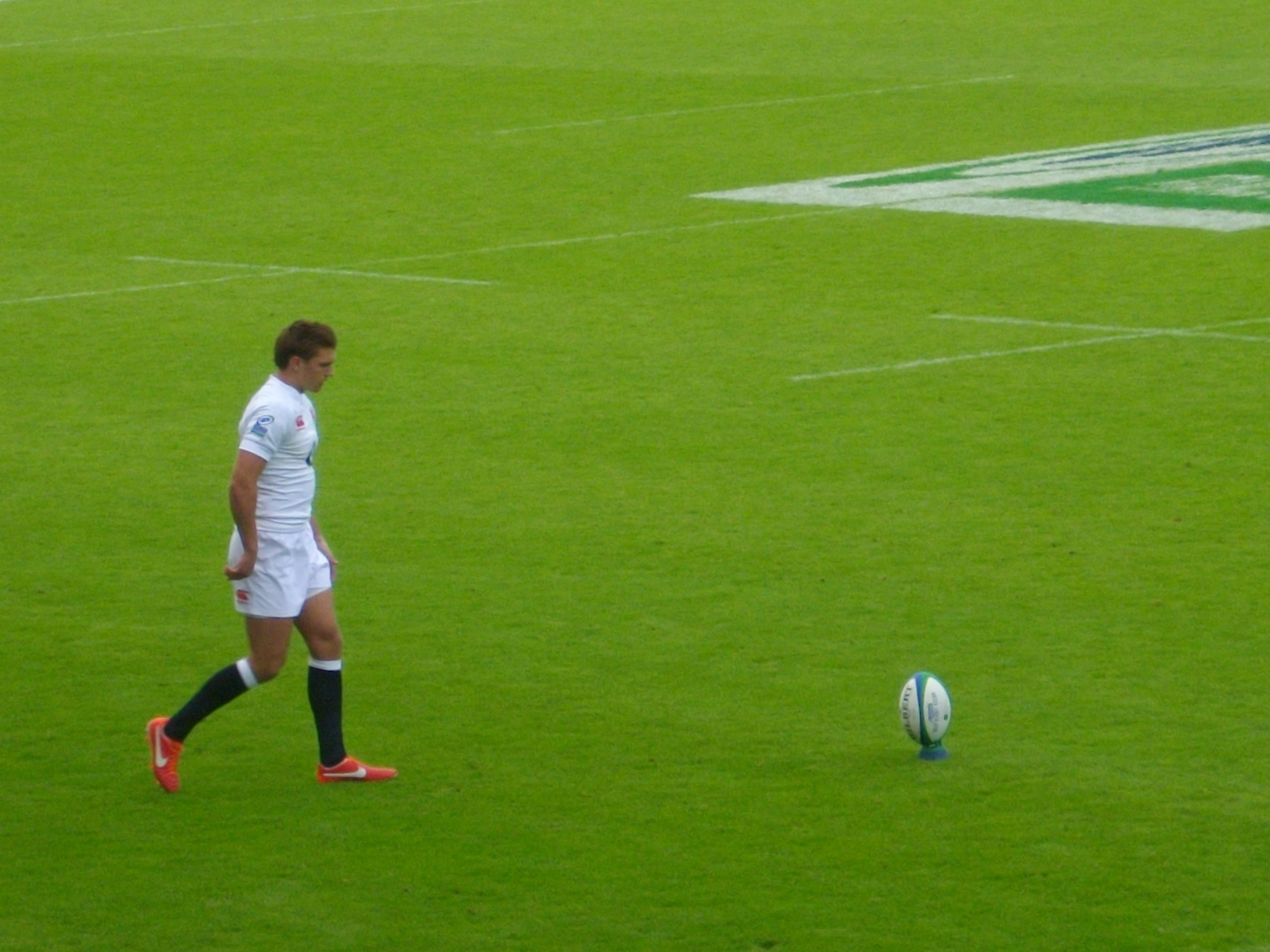
- Slade representing England during the IRB Junior World Championship
- Full name: Henry James Harvey Slade
- Born: 19 March 1993 (age 33) Plymouth, England
- Height: 1.88 m (6 ft 2 in)
- Weight: 98 kg (216 lb; 15 st 6 lb)
- School: Plymouth College
- University: University of Exeter

Rugby union career
- Position(s): Centre, Fly-half, Fullback
- Current team: Exeter Chiefs
Senior career
Years	Team	Apps	(Points)
2011–2012	Plymouth Albion	11	(15)
2012–	Exeter Chiefs	279	(1260)
- Correct as of 16 November 2026
International career
Years	Team	Apps	(Points)
2010–2011	England U18	8	(45)
2012–2013	England U20	13	(144)
2014–2015	England A	3	(13)
2015–	England	79	(67)
- Correct as of 16 November 2026

Henry James Harvey Slade (born 19 March 1993) is an English professional rugby union player who plays as a centre for Premiership Rugby club Exeter Chiefs and the England national team.

== Early life ==
Slade attended Plymouth College and then the University of Exeter reading for a BSc in Sports & Exercise Science.

== Club career ==
Slade plays for Exeter Chiefs in the English Premiership. He was dual-registered to Exeter and Plymouth Albion during the 2011–2012 season. On 13 April 2013 Slade made his Premiership debut against London Irish coming off the bench to replace Gareth Steenson, Slade scored his first premiership points in this game kicking over a conversion following a try from Dave Ewers. The following season saw Slade start for the side that beat Northampton Saints in the 2014 Anglo-Welsh Cup final to win Exeter their first major trophy in their history.

In May 2017 Slade came off the bench for the Exeter side that defeated Wasps in the Premiership final to become champions of England for the first time in their history. Slade scored a try in the 2020 European Rugby Champions Cup Final as Exeter defeated Racing to become champions of Europe for the first time. The following weekend saw Slade awarded the player of the match award as he scored another try to help the Chiefs overcome Wasps in the Premiership final completing a league and European double.

In May 2024, following an impressive season Slade was named in the Premiership Rugby Team of the Season for the 2023–24 campaign. He was also awarded Player of the Season having also become top point scorer for that year.

== International career ==
On 22 July 2010 Slade made his debut for the England under-18 team. England Academy coach John Fletcher once said of Slade "the way he plays reminds me of a young Toby Flood or Rory Clegg." Slade was a member of the England under-20 team that won consecutive titles in the 2012 and 2013 U20 Six Nations. He started for the side that defeated Wales in the final of the 2013 IRB Junior World Championship to become youth world champions for the first time. In January 2014 Slade made his debut at England 'A' level against Ireland Wolfhounds.

In June 2014 Slade scored fifteen points for England in an uncapped game against the Barbarian at Twickenham. He was included in the preliminary training squad by coach Stuart Lancaster for the 2015 Rugby World Cup and on 15 August 2015 won his first cap for England, partnering Sam Burgess in midfield during a warm-up victory over France. He was selected for the World Cup and scored his first international try on his only appearance during the tournament in their final pool game against Uruguay.

A broken leg suffered playing for Exeter in December 2015 meant Slade did not feature for new coach Eddie Jones until the 2016 autumn internationals against Fiji and Argentina. He made his first Six Nations appearance against Italy during the 2017 tournament which England retained. He started both tests on their 2017 tour of Argentina and later that year scored his second international try against Samoa. Slade was selected for the 2018 autumn International Series, and played in all four Test matches.

Slade scored tries against Ireland and France during the 2019 Six Nations Championship. He was included in the squad for the 2019 Rugby World Cup and featured in the quarter-final and semi-final victories over Australia and New Zealand. In the final he came off the bench during the second half to replace George Ford as England were defeated by South Africa to finish runners up.

Slade scored a try in the final round of the 2020 Six Nations Championship as England beat Italy to win the tournament. Later that year he scored a try in an Autumn Nations Cup match against Wales and then started in the final of the competition as England defeated France in extra-time to lift the trophy.

During the 2022 Autumn internationals Slade played in a draw with New Zealand and then scored a try in their next match against South Africa in what proved to be the last game in charge for coach Eddie Jones. The following year saw Slade feature in a warm-up fixture for the 2023 Rugby World Cup however he was ultimately not selected for the tournament.

== Personal life ==
Slade's mother is Jayne and he is the oldest of three boys; his brother Seb (b. 1995) is an actor, and the youngest, Albert (b. 2000), is a rugby player and student. Slade has Type 1 diabetes, and often injects insulin at half-time in a game.

Slade is the great nephew of former Portsmouth F.C. footballer Geoff Williamson.

In March 2020, Slade and his wife, Megan, announced that they were expecting their first child. On 14 August 2020, Megan gave birth to a daughter.

Slade has been criticised for comments he made in an interview in May 2021 where he stated that he would not take a vaccine for COVID-19. He has since made a statement through his club clarifying that his remarks were not to be taken as opposition to the Government's vaccine roll-out.

== Career statistics ==
=== List of international tries ===
as of 22 June 2024

No.	Date	Venue	Opponent	Score	Result	Competition	Ref.
1	10 October 2015	City of Manchester Stadium, Manchester, England	Uruguay	31–3	60–3	2015 Rugby World Cup	
2	25 November 2017	Twickenham Stadium, London, England	Samoa	34–7	48–14	2017 end-of-year rugby union internationals	
3	2 February 2019	Aviva Stadium, Dublin, Ireland	Ireland	22–13	32–20	2019 Six Nations Championship	
4	2 February 2019	Aviva Stadium, Dublin, Ireland	Ireland	30–13	32–20	2019 Six Nations Championship	
5	10 February 2019	Twickenham Stadium, London, England	France	28–8	44–8	2019 Six Nations Championship	
6	31 October 2020	Stadio Olimpico, Rome, Italy	Italy	34–5	34–5	2020 Six Nations Championship	
7	28 November 2020	Parc y Scarlets, Llanelli, Wales	Wales	5–7	24–13	Autumn Nations Cup	
8	26 November 2022	Twickenham Stadium, London, England	South Africa	11–27	13–27	2022 end-of-year rugby union internationals	
9	22 June 2024	Japan National Stadium, Tokyo, Japan	Japan	26–3	52–17	2024 tour of Japan	

== Honours ==
England

- 2× Six Nations Championship: 2017, 2020
- 1× Autumn Nations Cup: 2020
- 1× Rugby World Cup runner-up: 2019

Exeter Chiefs

- 2× Premiership Rugby: 2016–17, 2019–20
- 1× European Rugby Champions Cup: 2019–20
- 1× Anglo-Welsh Cup: 2013–14
