= Jonny Hill (rugby union) =

England international rugby union player

- Born: Jonathan Paul Hill; 8 June 1994 (age 32) Ludlow, England
- Height: 2.01 m (6 ft 7 in)
- Weight: 133 kg (293 lb; 20 st 13 lb)
- School: Ludlow School
- Notable relative: Paul Loughlin (uncle)

Rugby union career
- Position: Lock
- Current team: Racing 92
Youth career
- Luctonians
Senior career
Years	Team	Apps	(Points)
2013–2014	Gloucester	2	(0)
2015–2022	Exeter Chiefs	116	(160)
2022–2025	Sale Sharks	56	(45)
2025–	Racing 92	8	(0)
- Correct as of 3 November 2025
International career
Years	Team	Apps	(Points)
2014	England U20	2	(0)
2020–2023	England	23	(5)
2021	British & Irish Lions	0	(0)
- Correct as of 18 August 2025

Jonny Hill (born 8 June 1994) is an English professional rugby union player who plays at lock for Top 14 club Racing 92.

== Club career ==
Hill first started playing rugby at local club Luctonians. He represented Gloucester on two occasions in the Anglo-Welsh Cup. On 21 June 2015 it was announced that he would leave Gloucester to join their rivals Exeter Chiefs. In the 2019 Premiership final he scored a try as Exeter were defeated by Saracens. The following year Hill started in both the Premiership and 2020 European Rugby Champions Cup final as Exeter defeated Wasps and Racing 92 to complete a League and European double.

=== Sale Sharks ===
In December 2021, it was announced that Hill would leave Exeter to join Sale Sharks. In his first season with the club he started in the 2022–23 Premiership Rugby final which Sale lost against Saracens to finish league runners up.

In November 2024, Hill received a 10-week ban for an incident that took place during the playoff semi-final for the previous season against Bath. A Bath supporter claimed Hill had grabbed him by the throat and left him with a cut above his eye. He accepted the charge and became available to play again from 7 December 2024 onwards. At the end of that season he made his last appearance for Sale in a play-off defeat against Leicester Tigers.

=== Racing 92 ===
On 8 July 2025, Hill would leave Sale in the summer to sign for French giants Racing 92 on a three-year deal in the Top 14 competition ahead of the 2025–26 season.

== International career ==
Hill represented the England under-20 team twice during the 2014 Six Nations Under 20s Championship. He was selected for the 2014 IRB Junior World Championship however an ankle injury prevented his involvement.

Hill was selected in England's 34 man squad for their 2018 summer tour of South Africa and was an unused substitute in the third and final Test. On 31 October 2020 Hill made his England debut, pairing with Maro Itoje in the second row, in England's delayed final Six Nations match away to Italy, which England won to become the 2020 Six Nations champions. In December 2020 Hill came off the bench for England as they defeated France after extra-time to win the Autumn Nations Cup. He scored his first International try against Italy during the 2021 Six Nations Championship.

In May 2021 coach Warren Gatland included Hill in his squad for the 2021 British & Irish Lions tour to South Africa. He did not participate in any of the Test series but did score a try in a tour match against the Stormers.

In the opening match of their 2022 tour of Australia, Hill was given a Yellow Card for pulling the hair of opponent lock Darcy Swain. The Wallabies went on to win the match, scoring multiple tries and gaining the lead while Hill was serving his Yellow Card. He was labelled an "English villain" in the Australian press as a result of the incident. Hill retained his starting place for the next test which saw England level the contest. He played every minute of their last game of the tour as England defeated Australia at Sydney Cricket Ground to win the series.

During the 2022 Autumn internationals, Hill started in a draw with New Zealand. He also played in their next fixture as they were defeated by South Africa which was coach Eddie Jones last game in charge. The following year saw Hill included in a training camp by new coach Steve Borthwick preparing for the 2023 Rugby World Cup. Hill played in a warm-up defeat against Wales which ultimately proved to be his last appearance for England as he was not selected for the tournament.

=== International tries ===
As of 4 October 2022

Try	Opposing team	Location	Venue	Competition	Date	Result	Score
1	Italy	London, England	Twickenham Stadium	2021 Six Nations Championship	13 February 2021	Win	41 – 18

== Honours ==
England

- Six Nations Championship: 2020
- Autumn Nations Cup: 2020

Exeter Chiefs

- European Rugby Champions Cup: 2019–2020
- Premiership: 2019–2020
- Premiership runner up: 2017–2018, 2018–2019, 2020–2021

Sale Sharks

- Premiership runner up: 2022–2023
