= Alivereti Raka =

French rugby union player (born 1994)

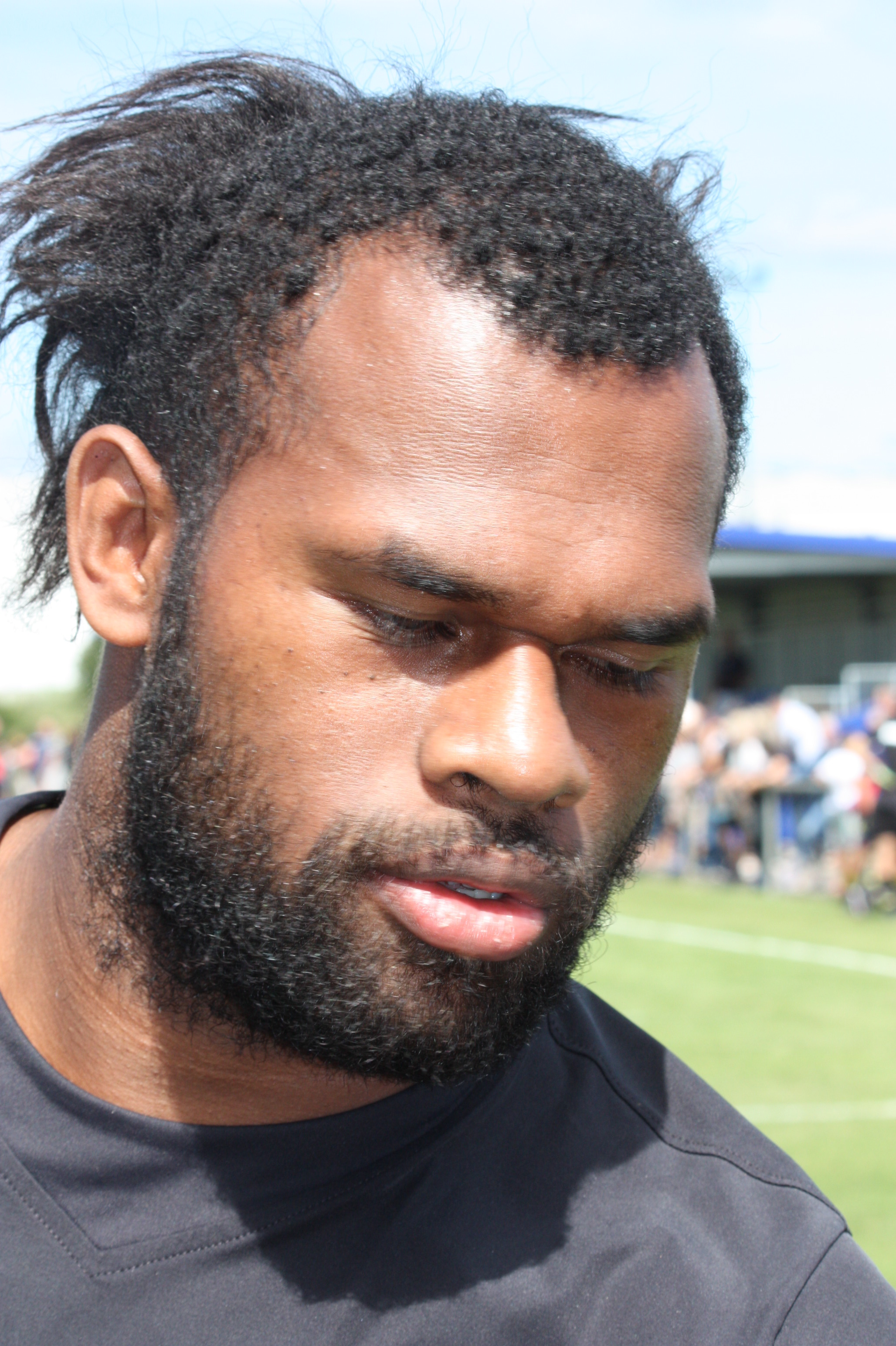
- Raka in 2017
- Born: 9 December 1994 (age 31) Nakorovatu, Naitasiri, Fiji
- Height: 1.84 m (6 ft 0 in)
- Weight: 95 kg (14 st 13 lb)

Rugby union career
- Position: Wing
- Current team: Clermont
Amateur team(s)
Years	Team	Apps	(Points)
- Nadroga
Senior career
Years	Team	Apps	(Points)
2015–	Clermont	178	(510)
- Correct as of 5 October 2025
International career
Years	Team	Apps	(Points)
2019–	France	5	(15)
- Correct as of 6 Dec 2020

Ratu Alivereti Raka (born 9 December 1994) is a Fijian born rugby union player who plays for the France national rugby union team. He played wing for Nadroga and now for French Top 14 side Clermont.

== Early life and career ==
Raka was born in Nakorovatu, Naitasiri, he studied at Waimala Secondary School. He played age grade rugby for Nadroga in the u16 and u20 grade before joining the main Nadroga team in 2014. He played 7's rugby for local side Tovolea before joining champion side Daveta in 2014. He made his debut for Nadroga in October 2014 against Vatukoula in the Skipper Cup scoring a try on debut.

== Clermont ==
Raka joined the ASM Clermont academy in November 2014 as part of a memorandum between Nadroga Rugby and ASM Clermont. He joined other players that had joined the academy such as Peceli Yato and Uwa Tuwalo.

Raka was selected into the main Clermont side for the 2015–16 Top 14 season. On September 5, he made his debut against Oyonnax Rugby off the bench and scored a try.

In March 2016, Raka scored 2 brilliant tries against Stade Toulousain. He has scored 5 tries in 6 games since his debut.

Raka played in the 2016–17 Top 14 Final after an injury ruled out Noa Nakaitaci and he scored Clermont's only try in the first half helping them to win the Final.

In September 2017, his contract with Clermont was extended by three more years.

== International career ==
=== International tries ===
International tries
No.	Date	Venue	Opponent	Score	Result	Competition
1	17 August 2019	Allianz Riviera, Nice, France	Scotland	5–3	32–3	2019 Rugby World Cup warm-up matches
2	2 October 2019	Fukuoka Hakatanomori Stadium, Fukuoka, Japan	United States	12–3	33–9	2019 Rugby World Cup
3	6 October 2019	Kumamoto Stadium, Kumamoto, Japan	Tonga	15–0	23–21	2019 Rugby World Cup

== Trivia ==
His surname "Raka" is the Fijian word for Rugby.
