= Sam Simmonds (rugby union) =

British Lions & England international rugby union player

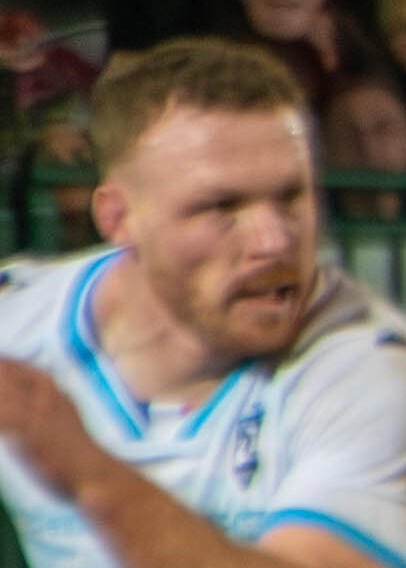
- Simmonds in 2024
- Born: Samuel David Simmonds; 10 November 1994 (age 32) Torquay, Devon, England
- Height: 1.83 m (6 ft 0 in)
- Weight: 108 kg (17 st 0 lb; 238 lb)
- School: Ivybridge Community College
- Notable relative: Joe Simmonds (brother)

Rugby union career
- Position(s): Number 8, Flanker
- Current team: Lyon
Senior career
Years	Team	Apps	(Points)
2012–2023	Exeter Chiefs	131	(425)
2014–2015	→ Plymouth Albion	11	(5)
2015–2017	→ Cornish Pirates	28	(30)
2023–2025	Montpellier	45	(30)
2026–	Lyon	20	(30)
International career
Years	Team	Apps	(Points)
2017–2022	England	19	(10)
2021	British & Irish Lions	1	(0)
- Correct as of 17 September 2023

Samuel David Simmonds (born 10 November 1994) is an English professional rugby union player who plays as a back row forward for Top 14 club Lyon. Previously he played for the Exeter Chiefs, and after graduating through their academy, Simmonds made his Exeter Chiefs debut in November 2012.

== Early life ==
Simmonds was born in Torquay and grew up in Teignmouth, Devon playing for local club Teignmouth RFC in his youth. His father and uncle are both in the fishing industry. As a child, he wanted to be a footballer, but after earning selection to play rugby for Devon aged fourteen, he switched his focus to it.

His younger brother, Joe Simmonds, also plays his rugby union in France, having joined Top 14 side Pau in 2023.

== Personal life ==
At age 18 Simmonds weighed about 85 kg.

== Club career ==
Simmonds came through the Exeter Chiefs academy, making his debut for the senior side in an Anglo-Welsh Cup game against London Welsh in November 2012. In February 2017, Simmonds played his first Premiership match for Exeter Chiefs against Wasps, earning the player of the Match award. In the 2017 Premiership semi-final against Saracens, Simmonds came on as a replacement when Chiefs were down three points towards the end of the game, scoring the winning try from a driving maul. He then featured again as a replacement in the final as Exeter defeated Wasps to be crowned champions of England for the first time in their history.

Simmonds scored a try in the 2020 European Rugby Champions Cup Final as Exeter defeated Racing to become champions of Europe for the first time. The following weekend saw Exeter overcome Wasps in the Premiership final to complete a league and European double. At the end of the season Simmonds was named European Player of the Year.

On 20 November 2020 Exeter opened the new Premiership season away at Harlequins, winning 33–3, with Simmonds scoring three tries – including an outstanding long-range effort – and taking the ‘man-of-the-match’ award. In doing so, he took his try tally in the Premiership to 34 in 49 games – and 47 in 70 games for Chiefs overall. By the end of 2020, Simmonds had scored eight tries in the four Premiership games Chiefs had played, and also scored a try in the Champions Cup game against Glasgow Warriors. During the Chiefs' match against London Irish on 18 May, Simmonds scored his 17th try of the season to draw level with the Premiership try-scoring record, before scoring his 18th and 19th tries of the season.

Simmonds left Exeter at the end of the 2022–23 season to join French Top14 side Montpellier.

Simmonds left Montpellier and joined Lyon in 2025

== International career ==
=== England ===
In October 2017 Simmonds received his first call-up to the senior England squad by coach Eddie Jones for the 2017 Autumn Internationals. On 11 November 2017 Simmonds made his debut against Argentina in 21–8 win at Twickenham. Later in the autumn series he made his first start against Samoa.

With Billy Vunipola and Nathan Hughes, Eddie Jones' first and second choice at No.8, unavailable through injury, Simmonds was called up to the England squad for the 2018 Six Nations Championship. He started in England's first match of the tournament against Italy, and scored two tries to help England to a 46–15 victory in Rome. In September 2021 after more than three years without playing for England Simmonds was recalled for the autumn International Series. He came off the bench in victories over Australia and South Africa.

=== British and Irish Lions ===
On 6 May 2021, Simmonds was named in the British & Irish Lions' squad for their tour to South Africa. His one Test appearance came as a second-half replacement for Jack Conan in the final game of the series as the Lions suffered a narrow defeat.

=== International tries ===
As of 7 July 2019

Try	Opponent	Location	Venue	Competition	Date	Result	Score
1	Italy	Rome, Italy	Stadio Olimpico	2018 Six Nations	4 February 2018	Win	46 – 15
2	Italy	Rome, Italy	Stadio Olimpico	2018 Six Nations	4 February 2018	Win	46 – 15

== Honours ==
Exeter

- European Rugby Champions Cup: 2019–2020
- Premiership: 2016–17, 2019–20

Individual

- European Player of the Year: 2019–20
