= Hame Faiva =

Italy international rugby union player

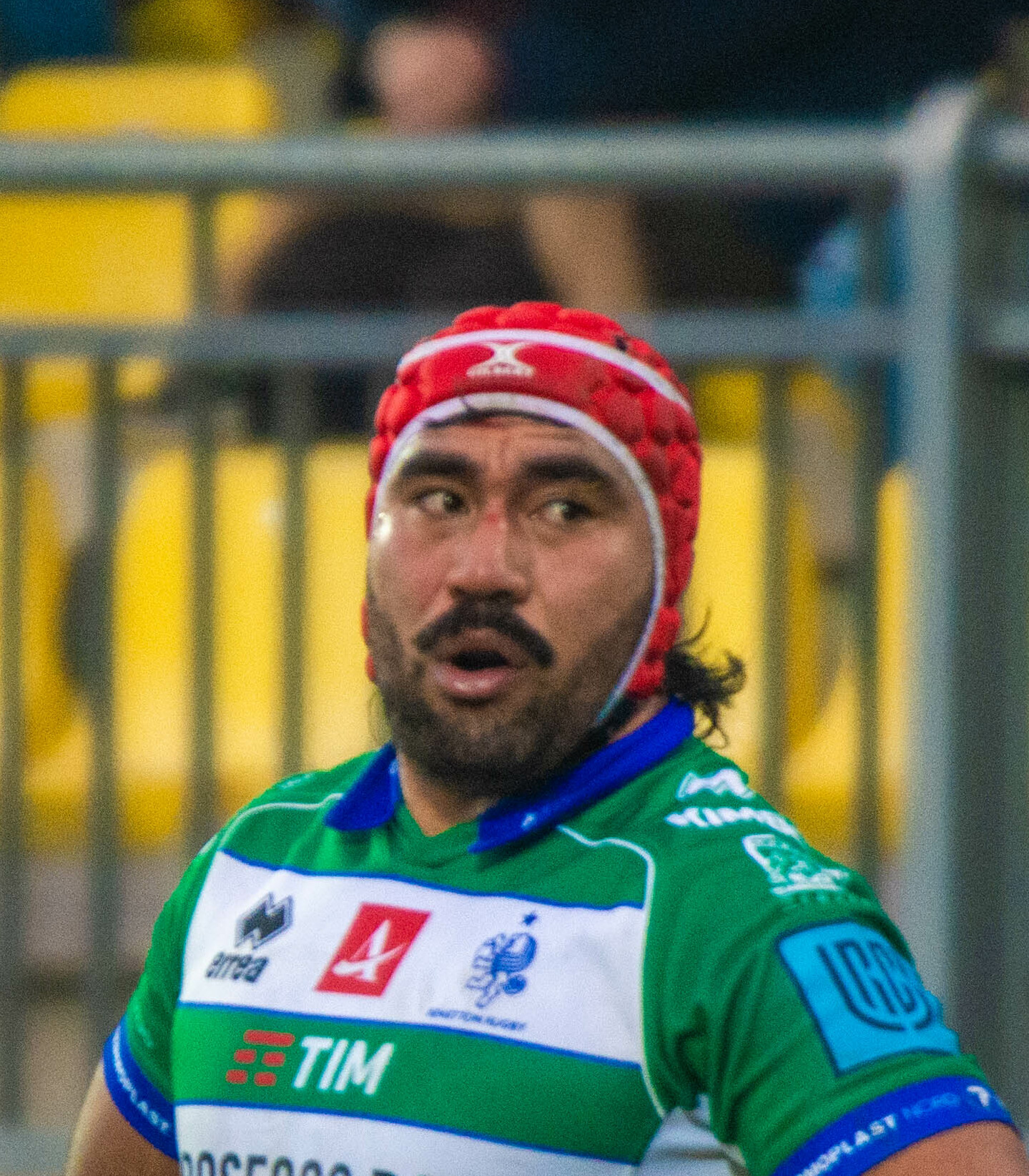
- Faiva in 2021
- Full name: Epalahame Faiva
- Born: 9 May 1994 (age 32) Auckland, New Zealand
- Height: 1.83 m (6 ft 0 in)
- Weight: 106 kg (16 st 10 lb; 234 lb)
- School: Wesley College

Rugby union career
- Position: Hooker
- Current team: Bath
Youth career
- 2005–2009: Counties Manukau
- 2009–2013: Waikato
Senior career
Years	Team	Apps	(Points)
2013–2017	Waikato	36	(35)
2017	Blues	6	(0)
2017–2022	Benetton	62	(115)
2022	Worcester Warriors	3	(0)
2023	Hurricanes	5	(10)
2023−2025	Bath	5	(0)
2025-2026	Newcastle		
- Correct as of 25 May 2025
International career
Years	Team	Apps	(Points)
2013–2014	New Zealand U20	8	(20)
2021	Italy A	1	(0)
2021–2023	Italy	10	(10)
- Correct as of 5 January 2024

Epalahame Faiva (born 9 May 1994) is a New Zealand-born Italian rugby union player who plays as a hooker for Newcastle Red Bulls in Gallagher Premiership.

== Early career ==
Born and raised in Auckland, Faiva attended Wesley College in the city and while there played for the Eden Rugby Club before later trying out rugby league. During his time at Wesley College, he also played representative rugby for Counties Manukau before shifting south to Waikato where he was a member of their academy and also played under-20 rugby.

== Club career ==
Faiva made his senior debut for Waikato in a Ranfurly Shield defense against Heartland Championship side Horowhenua-Kapiti in July 2013, aged just 19. He made his national provincial championship bow later in the year, but that was to be his sole appearance at that level in 2013. The following year brought more game time as he played 8 times and scored 2 tries as he began to establish himself as the Mooloo's first choice in the number 2 jersey. He subsequently played all 20 of Waikato's Premiership matches across the 2015 and 2016 seasons, 17 of these appearances came from the start and he also added 2 tries to his career total. From 2013 to 2017, he played for Waikato in the Mitre 10 Cup.

Several seasons of solid performances at provincial level were rewarded when he was named in the Blues squad ahead of the 2017 Super Rugby season.

On 13 November 2017, Fava leaves home to sign for Italy team Benetton in the Pro14 from the 2017–18 season. He played with Benetton until 2021−2022 season.

He recently played for Worcester Warriors in Premiership Rugby but had his contracted terminated along with every other Warriors player on 5 October 2022.

In March 2023 he was named in Hurricanes squad for Round 5 of 2023 Super Rugby Pacific season. He played with Super Rugby franchise until the end of the season.

On 17 November 2023, Faiva was signed by English side Bath with immediate effect on a undisclosed length deal, back in the Premiership Rugby.

== International career ==
Faiva was a member of the New Zealand Under-20 sides which competed in the 2013 and 2014 IRB Junior World Championships. He scored 4 tries in 8 appearances as the Kiwis finished in 4th and 3rd place respectively.

On the 14 October 2021, he was selected by Alessandro Troncon to be part of an Italy A 28-man squad for the 2021 end-of-year rugby union internationals.

On the 31 October 2021, he was selected by Kieran Crowley to be part of an Italy 34-man squad for the 2021 end-of-year rugby union internationals. On 20 October 2021 Faiva made his debut for Italy, scoring a try in Italy's 17–10 win over Uruguay.

On 22 August 2023, he was named in the Italy's 33-man squad for the 2023 Rugby World Cup.

=== International tries ===
As of 20 November 2021

Try	Opposing team	Location	Venue	Competition	Date	Result	Score
1	Uruguay	Parma, Italy	Stadio Sergio Lanfranchi	2021 end-of-year rugby union internationals	20 November 2021	Win	17 – 10
