= Luke Cowan-Dickie =

English rugby union player (born 1993)

- Full name: Luke Anthony Cowan-Dickie
- Born: 20 June 1993 (age 33) Truro, Cornwall
- Height: 1.83 m (6 ft 0 in)
- Weight: 111 kg (245 lb; 17 st 7 lb)
- School: Truro and Penwith College
- Notable relative(s): Julie Hitchens (mum), Tom Cowan-Dickie (brother), Rebecca Sincock (sister)

Rugby union career
- Position: Hooker
- Current team: Sale Sharks
Senior career
Years	Team	Apps	(Points)
2011–2014	Plymouth Albion	21	(25)
2011–2023	Exeter Chiefs	164	(200)
2023–	Sale Sharks	36	(70)
- Correct as of 13 November 2025
International career
Years	Team	Apps	(Points)
2009–2011	England U18	10	(5)
2011–2013	England U20	20	(20)
2015–	England	54	(55)
2021, 2025	British & Irish Lions	3	(5)
- Correct as of 13 November 2025

Luke Anthony Cowan-Dickie (born 20 June 1993) is an English professional rugby union player who plays as a hooker for Premiership Rugby club Sale Sharks and the England national team.

== Club career ==
Cowan-Dickie has previously been dual-registered with both the Cornish Pirates and Plymouth Albion to aid his player development.

On 19 November 2011 Cowan-Dickie made his debut for Exeter Chiefs at the age of eighteen in a EPCR Challenge Cup game against Cavalieri Prato. He made his Premiership debut in 2014 and that same year was part of the side that beat Northampton Saints in the final of the Anglo-Welsh Cup. He has played more than a hundred games in the Premiership, scoring a hat-trick against Harlequins during the 2016–17 season which culminated in Exeter defeating Wasps in the final to win their first League title.

Cowan-Dickie scored the opening try of the 2020 European Rugby Champions Cup final as Exeter defeated Racing 92 to become European champions for the first time. Exeter then defeated Wasps the following weekend to complete a League and European double.

In July 2023, Cowan-Dickie announced he had signed for Sale Sharks.

== International career ==
=== England ===
In 2010 Cowan-Dickie represented England under-18. He was a member of the England under-20 team that won three successive titles in the 2011, 2012 and 2013 U20 Six Nations. He was part of the squad that finished seventh at the 2012 IRB Junior World Championship.

Cowan-Dickie scored a try against France at the 2013 IRB Junior World Championship and subsequently started in the final of that tournament as England defeated Wales to become Junior World Champions for the first time. In January 2015 Cowan-Dickie represented England A against Ireland Wolfhounds.

Cowan-Dickie was named in the 50-man training squad for the 2015 Rugby World Cup. On 15 August 2015, Cowan-Dickie made his senior international debut against France as a second-half substitute for Rob Webber in a warm-up match for the 2015 World Cup at Twickenham. He was ultimately not selected for the tournament.

In 2016 Cowan-Dickie was part of the team that achieved the Grand Slam during the 2016 Six Nation, and later that year was a member of their tour party for the successful summer tour to Australia. Later that year, he was ruled out of the November internationals with an ankle injury. A knee injury sustained in early 2017 meant Cowan-Dickie missed out on touring Argentina in the Summer, but he returned to International Rugby in 2018 as he was called up by Eddie Jones to join the Six Nations training squad. He was later selected for the three-Test tour of South Africa where he made two appearances as a replacement as England lost the series 2-1.

Cowan-Dickie scored his first international tries against Wales and Ireland in warm-up games for the 2019 Rugby World Cup. He was selected for the tournament and scored in all three pool stage games against Tonga, USA and Argentina. In the World Cup final he was a second-half substitute for Jamie George as England were defeated by South Africa to finish runners-up.

After the World Cup Cowan-Dickie scored a try against Ireland in the 2020 Six Nations Championship which England went on to win. Later that year, he scored a try as England beat France in the final of the Autumn Nations Cup. Cowan-Dickie was selected for their 2022 tour of Australia and played in all three games as England won the series.

After a two year absence from the national team due to injury, including missing the 2023 Rugby World Cup, Cowan-Dickie returned to the England squad for the Autumn International series in October 2024. He scored two tries in their last game of the calendar year in a victory against Japan.

=== British and Irish Lions ===
Cowan-Dickie was named in the squad for the 2021 British & Irish Lions tour to South Africa. He made his debut off the bench in the 14-56 victory over Sigma Lions. He then went on to feature in tour matches against Sharks and South Africa 'A'. In the Lions' match against Stormers he scored his first try of the tour and was named Player of the Match.

Cowan-Dickie made his Lions test debut in the first Test against South Africa, scoring the only try of the game for the Lions in a 17-22 win. He also started the second test, a 27-9 loss. Cowan-Dickie was on the bench for the final test, with Welsh hooker Ken Owens taking his starting spot. The close 19-16 loss meant that South Africa won the series 2-1.

On 8 May 2025, Cowan-Dickie was selected again for the 2025 British & Irish Lions tour to Australia.

== Career statistics ==
=== List of international tries ===
as of 24 November 2024.

No.	Date	Venue	Opponent	Score	Result	Competition	Ref.
1	11 August 2019	Twickenham Stadium, London, England	Wales	19–7	33–19	2019 Rugby World Cup warm-up matches	
2	24 August 2019	Twickenham Stadium, London, England	Ireland	55–15	57–15	2019 Rugby World Cup warm-up matches	
3	22 September 2019	Sapporo Dome, Sapporo, Japan	Tonga	33–3	35–3	2019 Rugby World Cup	
4	26 September 2019	Kobe City Misaki Park Stadium, Kobe, Japan	United States	15–0	45–7	2019 Rugby World Cup	
5	5 October 2019	Tokyo Stadium, Chōfu, Japan	Argentina	37–10	39–10	2019 Rugby World Cup	
6	23 February 2020	Twickenham Stadium, London, England	Ireland	22–5	24–12	2020 Six Nations Championship	
7	6 December 2020	Twickenham Stadium, London, England	France	17–19	22–19	Autumn Nations Cup	
8	24 July 2021	Cape Town Stadium, Cape Town, South Africa	South Africa	8–12	22–17	2021 British & Irish Lions tour to South Africa	
9	24 November 2024	Twickenham Stadium, London, England	Japan	45–7	59–14	2024 end-of-year rugby union internationals	
10	24 November 2024	Twickenham Stadium, London, England	Japan	50–14	59–14	2024 end-of-year rugby union internationals	

== Honours ==
England

- 2× Six Nations Championship: 2016, 2020
- 1× Autumn Nations Cup: 2020
- 1× Rugby World Cup runner-up: 2019

Exeter

- 1× European Rugby Champions Cup: 2020
- 2× Premiership Rugby: 2017, 2020
- 1× Anglo-Welsh Cup: 2014
