= Louis Dupichot =

French rugby union player

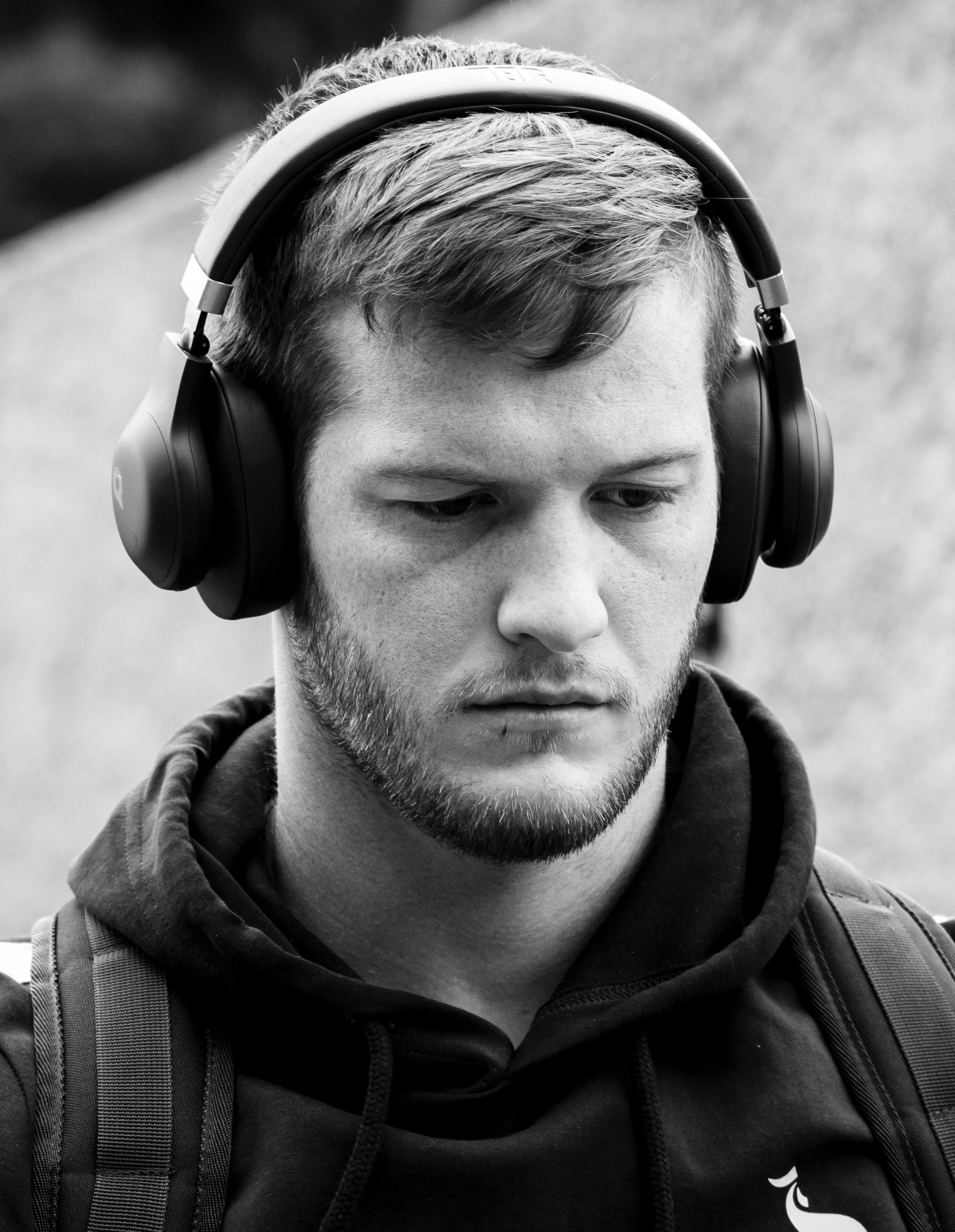
- Born: 23 September 1995 (age 31) Paris, France
- Height: 1.83 m (6 ft 0 in)
- Weight: 86 kg (13 st 8 lb)

Rugby union career
- Position: winger
- Current team: Racing 92
Senior career
Years	Team	Apps	(Points)
2013–	Racing 92	79	(130)
2016–2017	→ Section Paloise (loan)	20	(20)
- Correct as of 18 September 2020

Louis Dupichot (born 23 September 1995 in Paris) is a French rugby union player. He plays as a winger for Racing Métro in the Top 14.
