= Maxime Machenaud =

French rugby union player (born 1988)

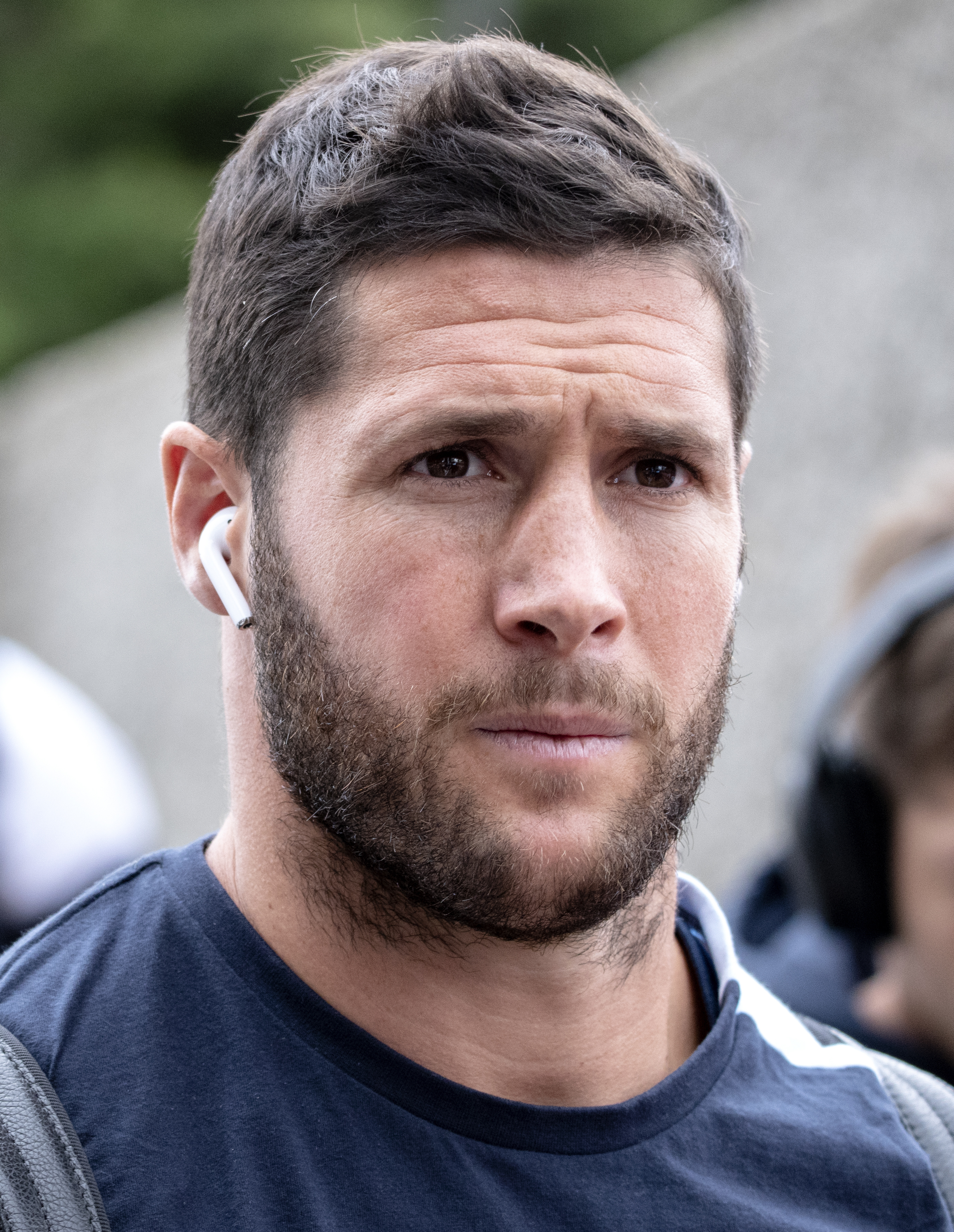
- Machenaud whilst playing for Racing 92 in 2019
- Born: 30 December 1988 (age 37) Bordeaux, France
- Height: 1.74 m (5 ft 8 1/2 in)
- Weight: 87 kg (13 st 10 lb; 192 lb)

Rugby union career
- Position: Scrum-half
- Current team: Bayonne
Senior career
Years	Team	Apps	(Points)
2007–2010	Bordeaux Bègles	52	(35)
2010–2012	Agen	51	(45)
2012–2022	Racing 92	236	(1,307)
2022–	Bayonne	65	(59)
- Correct as of 22 May 2025
International career
Years	Team	Apps	(Points)
2012–2019	France	38	(149)

Maxime Machenaud (born 30 December 1988) is a French rugby union player. His position is scrum-half and he currently plays for Bayonne and formerly of the France national team.

== Club career ==
Born in Bordeaux, he trained at Stade Bordelais and as a youth at the CABBG (Athletic Club Bordeaux Bègles Gironde). He began his career with home-town club Bordeaux Bègles in the Pro D2, before moving to SU Agen in the Top 14 in 2010. In 2012 he joined Racing Métro. In the final of the 2015–16 Top 14 season Machenaud picked up an early red card for a tackle on Matt Giteau, however Racing still went on to defeat Toulon.

== International career ==
He made his international debut during France's 2012 tour of Argentina, during which he scored his first international try.

In November 2022, he was called up for the French Barbarians to face Fiji at the Stade Pierre-Mauroy.

=== List of international tries ===
International tries
No.	Date	Venue	Opponent	Score	Result	Competition
1	23 July 2012	Estadio José Fierro, Tucumán, Argentina	ARG	3–28	10–49	2012 Argentina test series

== Honours ==
(France) Racing 92

- Top 14: 2015–16
