= Teddy Iribaren =

France international rugby union player

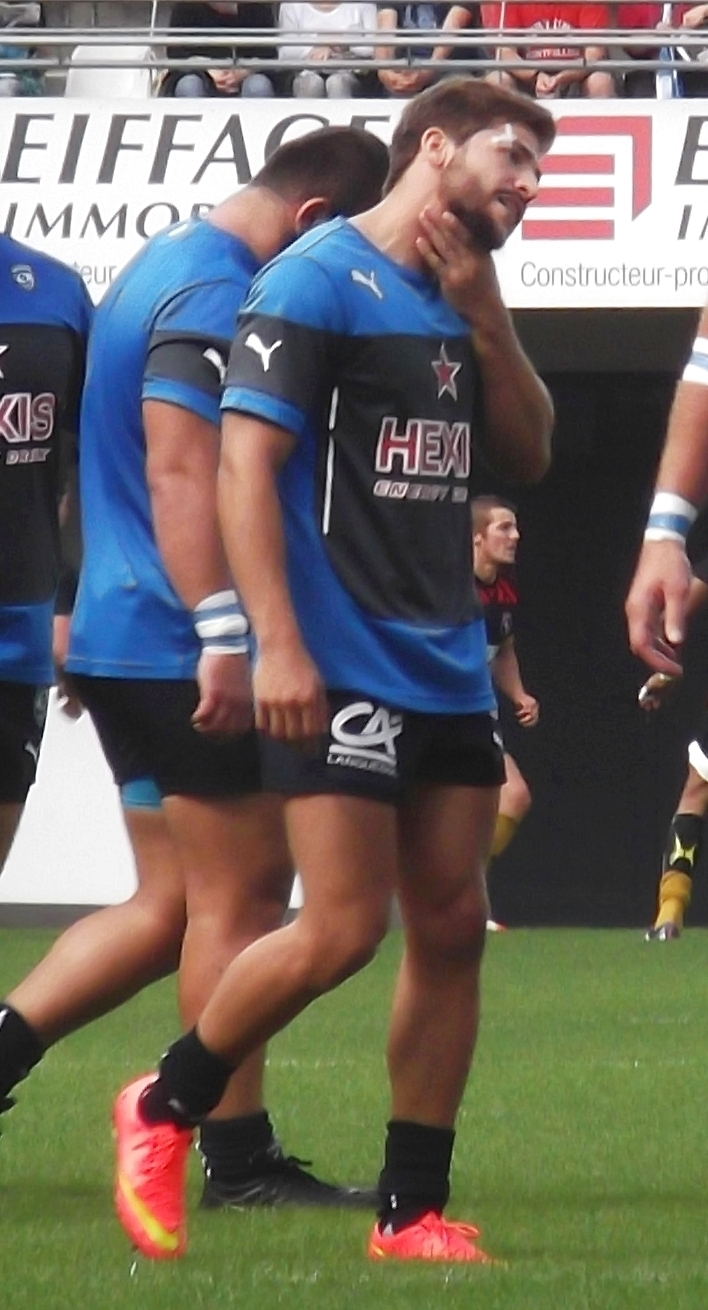
- Iribaren with Montpellier in 2014
- Born: Teddy Iribaren; 25 September 1990 (age 36) Toulouse, France
- Height: 1.70 m (5 ft 7 in)
- Weight: 70 kg (11 st 0 lb)

Rugby union career
- Position: Scrum-half
- Current team: La Rochelle
Senior career
Years	Team	Apps	(Points)
2011–2014	Tarbes	63	(55)
2014–2015	Montpellier	12	(63)
2015–2017	Brive	43	(29)
2017–2023	Racing 92	113	(498)
2023–	La Rochelle	3	(0)
- Correct as of 18 October 2023
International career
Years	Team	Apps	(Points)
2021	France	2	(0)
- Correct as of 17 July 2021

Teddy Iribaren (born 25 September 1990) is a French rugby union player. His position is scrum-half and he currently plays for Stade Rochelais in the Top 14.
