= Joe Simmonds =

English rugby union player

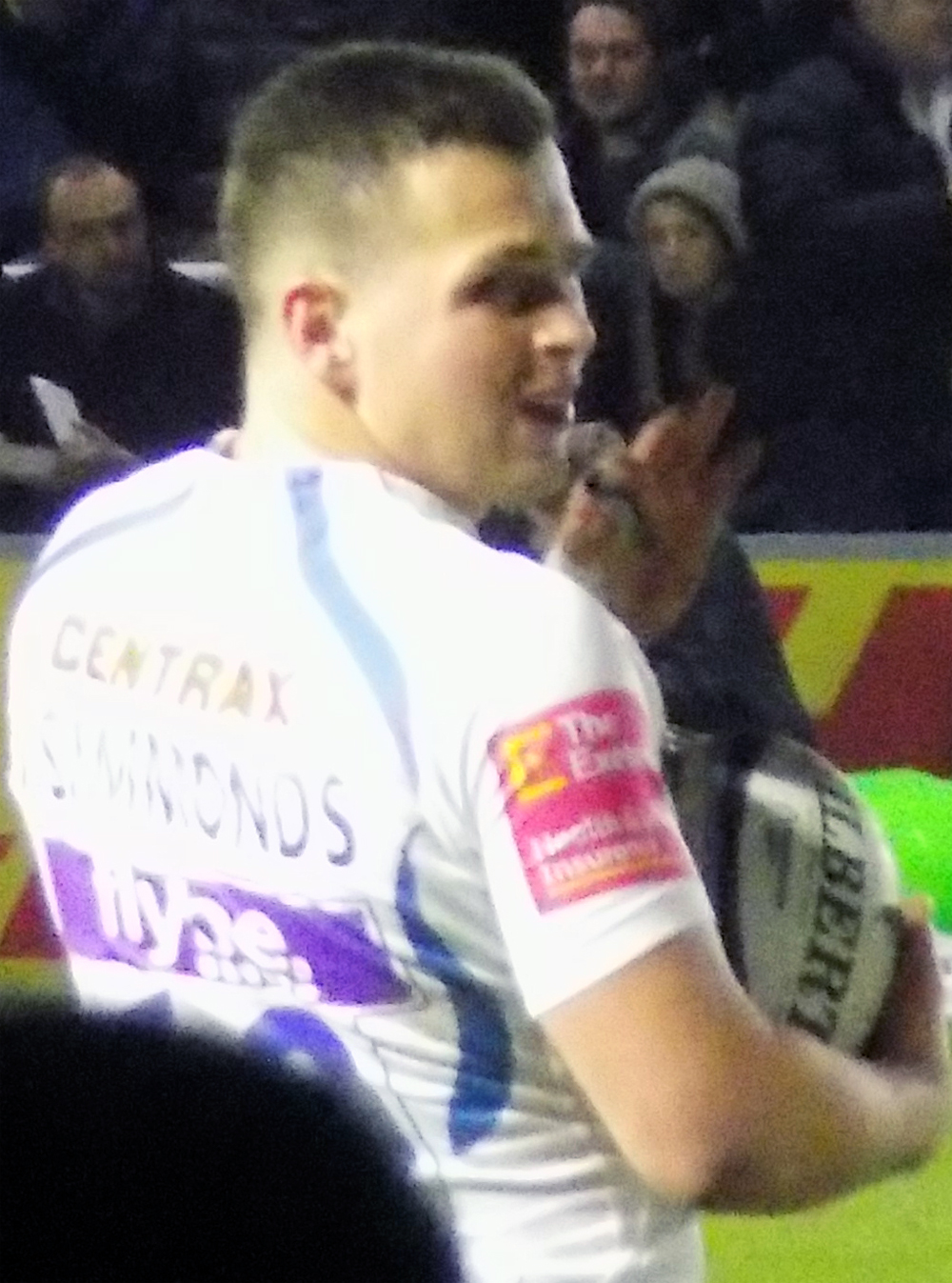
- Simmonds playing for Exeter, November 2018
- Born: Joe Simmonds; 19 December 1996 (age 29) Torquay, England
- Height: 6 ft (183 cm)
- Weight: 191 lb (87 kg)
- School: Ivybridge Community College
- Notable relative: Sam Simmonds (brother)

Rugby union career
- Position(s): Fly half, Full back
- Current team: Pau
Senior career
Years	Team	Apps	(Points)
2015–2023	Exeter Chiefs	170	(1,114)
2015–2016	→ Taunton	10	(20)
2016–2017	→ Plymouth Albion	10	(21)
2023–	Pau	70	(830)
- Correct as of 21 October 2025
International career
Years	Team	Apps	(Points)
2016	England U20	2	(6)
- Correct as of 17 July 2019

Joe Simmonds MBE (born 19 December 1996) is an English rugby union player for Top 14 side Section Paloise. He plays as a fly-half and was the Captain of Exeter Chiefs before joining Pau.

== Early life ==
Simmonds grew up in Teignmouth, Devon, where his father and uncle are both in the fishing industry.

His elder brother is Sam Simmonds. In their youth, both attended the Rugby Academy at Ivybridge Community College.

== Rugby playing career ==
Simmonds made his full debut for Exeter on 4 March 2018 against Saracens and was named man of the match.

The following week, he kicked the winning penalty as Exeter beat the Newcastle Falcons to advance to the Anglo-Welsh Cup final.

In the final, which was rearranged to March 30 due to snow, Simmonds kicked 13 points as the Chiefs won the cup 28–11 against Bath Rugby. In the previous season, he had played in the Anglo-Welsh Cup final but Exeter lost to Leicester Tigers on that occasion.

Simmonds was made captain of Exeter Chiefs in the European Rugby Champions Cup when Exeter played Glasgow Warriors in round five of the Cup in January 2020. Jack Yeandle remained the club captain.

Simmonds led Exeter on the pitch in the delayed final of the 2020 Champions Cup. Simmonds is the youngest player to captain a side to victory in the final of the European Cup. He also won 'Star of the Match' for his performance in that game and kicked 5 successful kicks out of 5 attempts. He was the top points scorer in the 2019–20 European Rugby Champions Cup.

In May 2023, it was confirmed Simmonds was signing for the French side, Pau, after the implementation of new financial restrictions in the Premiership resulted in several players leaving Exeter Chiefs.

After seven seasons with Exeter, where he scored over 1,000 points, Joe Simmonds decided to continue his career in France. He joined Section Paloise for the 2023–24 season, signing a two-year contract.

Upon his arrival, he quickly established himself as the starting fly-half, securing three consecutive starts in the Top 14. Despite initially having limited proficiency in French, he adapted quickly, aided by his compatriot and international scrum-half Dan Robson. He also highlighted the differences between playing in France and England, noting a faster pace and a less rigid structure, which suited his style of play.

After just three matches, he was voted Player of the Month for September by the fans and led the league in points scored.

In his first Top 14 season, he emerged as a key player. He played 24 matches (starting 23) and finished as the league’s top points scorer with 246 points. He was also the most-used player in the league in terms of minutes played.

His second season (2024–25) saw him solidify his role as the team's playmaker. Despite numerous injuries in the squad, he remained a key player in both attack and defense. In September 2024, he extended his contract with Section Paloise until 2028.

On matchday 19 of the 2024–25 Top 14 season, he played a decisive role against Montpellier Hérault Rugby. He scored a last-minute drop goal, securing a 40-38 victory and keeping the team in the race for the top six.

== Honours ==
Exeter Chiefs

- European Rugby Champions Cup: 2019–20
- Premiership Rugby: 2019–20
- Anglo-Welsh Cup: 2017–18
