= 2018–19 Premiership Rugby =

Rugby union competition in England

2018–19 Gallagher Premiership
- Countries: England
- Date: 31 August 2018 – 1 June 2019
- Champions: Saracens (5th title)
- Runners-up: Exeter Chiefs
- Relegated: Newcastle Falcons
- Matches played: 135
- Attendance: 1,958,402 (average 14,507 per match)
- Highest attendance: 82,000; Harlequins v Wasps; 29 December 2018
- Lowest attendance: 5,586; Sale v Newcastle; 6 October 2018
- Tries scored: 759 (average 5.6 per match)
- Top point scorer: George Ford (Leicester) (221 points)
- Top try scorer: Cobus Reinach (Northampton), Denny Solomona (Sale) (12 tries)

Official website
- www.premiershiprugby.com

The 2018–19 Gallagher Premiership was the 32nd season of the top flight English domestic rugby union competition and the first one to be sponsored by Gallagher. The reigning champions entering the season were Saracens, who had claimed their fourth title after defeating Exeter Chiefs in the 2018 final. Bristol Bears had been promoted as champions from the 2017–18 RFU Championship at the first attempt.

The competition was broadcast by BT Sport for the sixth successive season and with five games also simulcast free-to-air on Channel 5. Highlights of each weekend's games were shown on Channel 5 with extended highlights on BT Sport.

== Summary ==
Saracens won their fifth title after defeating Exeter Chiefs in the final at Twickenham after having finished second in the regular season table. Newcastle Falcons were relegated after being unable to win their penultimate game of the season. It was the third time that Newcastle have been relegated from the top flight since the leagues began and the first time since the 2011–12 Premiership Rugby season.

For the first time since 2004, there was no London Double Header at Twickenham due to redevelopment work causing the closure of the stadium.

== Teams ==
Twelve teams compete in the league – the top eleven teams from the previous season and Bristol Bears who were promoted from the 2017–18 RFU Championship after a top flight absence of one year. They replaced London Irish who were relegated after one year in the top flight.

=== Stadiums and locations ===
2018–19 Gallagher Premiership Teams

Club	Director of Rugby/ Head Coach	Captain	Kit supplier	Stadium	Capacity	City/Area
Bath	(New Zealand) Todd Blackadder	(England) Matt Garvey	Canterbury	The Recreation Ground (Note: Bath will also play a home game at Twickenham Stadium on 6 April 2019)	14,509	Bath
Bristol Bears	(Samoa) Pat Lam	N/A (Leadership Group)	Bristol Sport	Ashton Gate	27,000	Bristol
Exeter Chiefs	(England) Rob Baxter	(England) Jack Yeandle	Samurai Sportswear	Sandy Park	12,921 (Note: Sandy Park's capacity was 12,800 at the start of the season, expanding up to 12,921 from April 2019)	Exeter
Gloucester	(Ireland) David Humphreys	(New Zealand) Willi Heinz	XBlades	Kingsholm	16,115	Gloucester
Harlequins	(England) Paul Gustard	(Australia) James Horwill (England) Chris Robshaw	Adidas	Twickenham Stoop (Note: Harlequins will also play a home game at Twickenham Stadium on 29 December 2018)	14,800	Twickenham, Greater London
Leicester Tigers	(Ireland) Geordan Murphy	(England) Tom Youngs	Kukri	Welford Road	25,849	Leicester
Newcastle Falcons	(England) Dean Richards	(England) Will Welch	ISC	Kingston Park (Note: Newcastle Falcons will also play a home game at St James' Park on 23 March 2019)	10,200	Newcastle upon Tyne
Northampton Saints	(New Zealand) Chris Boyd	(England) Dylan Hartley (England) Alex Waller	Macron	Franklin's Gardens (Note: Northampton Saints will also play a home game at Twickenham Stadium on 6 October 2018)	15,249	Northampton
Sale Sharks	(England) Steve Diamond	(South Africa) Jono Ross	Samurai Sportswear	AJ Bell Stadium	12,000	Salford, Greater Manchester
Saracens	(Ireland) Mark McCall	(England) Brad Barritt	Nike	Allianz Park (Note: Saracens will also play a home game at London Stadium on 23 March 2019)	10,000 (Note: Allianz Park typically has a capacity of 10,000 but this can be raised to 15,000 with temporary seating)	Hendon, Greater London
Wasps	(Wales) Dai Young	(England) Joe Launchbury	Under Armour	Ricoh Arena	32,609	Coventry
Worcester Warriors	(South Africa) Alan Solomons	(South Africa) GJ van Velze	VX3	Sixways Stadium	11,499	Worcester

== Preseason ==
The 2018 edition of the Premiership Rugby Sevens Series would be held on 27 and 28 July at Franklin's Gardens. All twelve Premiership teams would feature in one venue over two days. Teams would be split into four pools of three which played each other once in a round-robin basis with the tournament splitting into Cup and Plate competitions on the second day.

== Table ==
2018–19 Premiership Rugby Table
Pos	Team	Pld	W	D	L	PF	PA	PD	TF	TA	TB	LB	Pts	Qualification or relegation
1	Exeter Chiefs (RU)	22	17	0	5	630	438	+192	89	51	14	4	86	Play-off place, Berth in the 2019–20 European Rugby Champions Cup
2	Saracens (C)	22	16	0	6	644	440	+204	77	44	10	4	78	Play-off place, Berth in the 2019–20 European Rugby Champions Cup
3	Gloucester (SF)	22	13	1	8	587	515	+72	75	60	10	4	68	Play-off place, Berth in the 2019–20 European Rugby Champions Cup
4	Northampton Saints (SF)	22	11	0	11	590	521	+69	73	62	8	4	56	Play-off place, Berth in the 2019–20 European Rugby Champions Cup
5	Harlequins	22	10	0	12	544	528	+16	63	56	7	9	56	Berth in the 2019–20 European Rugby Champions Cup
6	Bath	22	10	2	10	481	480	+1	52	54	6	6	56	Berth in the 2019–20 European Rugby Champions Cup
7	Sale Sharks	22	11	2	9	462	504	−42	52	62	3	4	55	Berth in the 2019–20 European Rugby Champions Cup (Note: Berth based on being losing semi-finalists of the 2018–19 European Rugby Challenge Cup. This is due to the 2018–19 European Rugby Champions Cup winners (Saracens), Challenge Cup winners (Clermont), Challenge Cup losing finalist (La Rochelle) and the other Challenge Cup losing semi-finalist (Harlequins) all qualifying for the 2019–20 European Rugby Champions Cup through their domestic leagues positions.)
8	Wasps	22	10	0	12	483	552	−69	56	62	7	4	51	2019–20 European Rugby Challenge Cup
9	Bristol Bears	22	9	1	12	503	580	−77	55	74	6	7	51	2019–20 European Rugby Challenge Cup
10	Worcester Warriors	22	9	0	13	491	557	−66	56	66	6	4	46	2019–20 European Rugby Challenge Cup
11	Leicester Tigers	22	7	0	15	478	632	−154	47	81	5	8	41	2019–20 European Rugby Challenge Cup
12	Newcastle Falcons (Note: The champion of the Championship (London Irish) are eligible for promotion) (R)	22	6	0	16	395	541	−146	43	66	1	6	31	Relegated

Source: Premiership Rugby
Rules for classification: Tiebreakers for teams tied on points: 1) Number of matches won; 2) Difference between points for and against; 3) Total number of points for; 4) Aggregate number of points scored in matches between tied teams; 5) Number of matches won excluding the first match, then the second and so on until the tie is settled
(C) Champions; (RU) Runners-up; (SF) Losing semi-finalists; (R) Relegated

== Fixtures ==
Fixtures for the season were announced by Premiership Rugby on 6 July 2018. Due to redevelopment work causing the closure of Twickenham Stadium, round 1 did not include the London Double Header.

Despite a four-year deal being struck in 2016, no matches took place in the United States. It had previously been reported that Sale Sharks vs Harlequins in round 18 would take place at Toyota Park just outside Chicago, Illinois. However, the round 6 match between Harlequins and Saracens was broadcast live in the US on a major network with NBC as opposed to NBCSN broadcasting for the first time.

All fixtures are subject to change.

Highlights of the season include:

- The Derby — Northampton Saints vs Leicester Tigers at Twickenham on 6 October.
- Big Game 11 — Harlequins vs Wasps in this season's edition of the Big Game at Twickenham on 29 December.
- Derby Day — Saracens vs Harlequins at London Stadium on 23 March.
- The Big One — Newcastle Falcons vs Sale Sharks at St James' Park on 23 March.
- The Clash — Bath Rugby vs Bristol Bears at Twickenham on 6 April.

=== Regular season ===
==== Round 1 ====
31 August 2018
19:45

Bristol Bears	17 – 10	Bath (1 BP)
Try: Leiua 71' m Pen: Madigan (4/4) 8', 28', 42', 67'	Report	Try: Homer 51' c Con: Priestland (1/1) 53'; Pen: Priestland (1/3) 62'

Ashton Gate
Attendance: 26,079
Referee: JP Doyle

1 September 2018
14:00

Gloucester	27 – 16	Northampton Saints
Try: Hanson 4' m Sharples 33' c Con: Twelvetrees (1/2) 35'; Pen: Twelvetrees (5/6) 1', 12', 24', 62', 76'	Report	Try: Francis 14' m Lawes 65' m Pen: Biggar (2/2) 10', 21'

Kingsholm
Attendance: 13,781
Referee: Matthew Carley

1 September 2018
15:00

(1 BP) Harlequins	51 – 23	Sale Sharks
Try: Tapaui (2) 21' c, 39' c Earle 34' c Marchant 55' c M. Smith 70' c Crumpton 78' c Con: M. Smith (6/6) 22', 36', 40', 56', 71', 79'; Pen: M. Smith (3/4) 3', 42', 49'	Report	Try: MacGinty 24' c Yarde 29' c Con: MacGinty (2/2) 26', 31'; Pen: MacGinty (3/3) 16', 38', 51'

Twickenham Stoop
Attendance: 11,463
Referee: Craig Maxwell-Keys

1 September 2018
15:00

(1 BP) Worcester Warriors	20 – 21	Wasps
Try: Mills 15' c Lewis 52' c Con: Weir (2/2) 17', 53'; Pen: Weir (2/2) 3', 9'	Report	Try: Launchbury 49' c Taylor 56' m Con: Searle (1/2) 49'; Pen: Searle (2/3) 27', 35', 68'

Sixways
Attendance: 7,796
Referee: Karl Dickson

1 September 2018
16:30

(1 BP) Exeter Chiefs	40 – 6	Leicester Tigers
Try: Woodburn 27' c S. Simmonds 36' c Cowan-Dickie 60' c Slade 64' c Kvesic 75' m Whitten 78' c Con: Steenson (5/6) 28', 37', 61', 66', 79'	Report	Pen: G. Ford (2/3) 14', 25'

Sandy Park
Attendance: 10,452
Referee: Wayne Barnes

2 September 2018
15:00

Newcastle Falcons	21 – 32	Saracens (1 BP)
Try: M. Wilson (2) 55' m, 70' c Con: Flood (1/2) 71'; Pen: Flood (3/3) 3', 8', 33'	Report	Try: George 14' c Lewington (2) 39' c, 60' m Tompkins 75' c Con: Farrell (3/4) 15', 40', 76'; Pen: Farrell (2/2) 11', 80'

Kingston Park
Attendance: 7,015
Referee: Ian Tempest

==== Round 2 ====
7 September 2018
19:45

Northampton Saints	25 – 18	Harlequins (1 BP)
Try: Hartley 55' c Con: Biggar (1/1) 56'; Pen: Biggar (5/6) 18', 33', 40', 45', 62'; Mallinder (1/1) 76'	Report	Try: Care 51' c Lang 71' m Con: M. Smith (1/1) 52'; Pen: M. Smith (2/2) 7', 64'

Franklin's Gardens
Attendance: 11,865
Referee: Tom Foley

8 September 2018
14:00

(1 BP) Wasps	31 – 42	Exeter Chiefs (1 BP)
Try: Daly 2' c Bassett 13' c Hughes 37' c Robson 68' c Con: Searle (3/3) 3', 14', 38'; Sopoaga (1/1) 69'; Pen: Searle (1/1) 33'	Report	Try: Cordero 11' c S. Simmonds (2) 17' c, 44' c Slade (2) 24' c, 48' c Armand 79' c Con: Steenson (6/6) 12', 18', 25', 45', 49', 80'

Ricoh Arena
Attendance: 13,104
Referee: Christophe Ridley

8 September 2018
15:00

(1 BP) Leicester Tigers	49 – 33	Newcastle Falcons (1 BP)
Try: G. Ford 1' m May (2) 8' c, 40' m Thompstone 12' c Tuilagi 22' c Con: G. Ford (3/5) 9', 14', 23'; Pen: G. Ford (6/6) 6', 20', 29', 47', 56', 80'	Report	Try: Takulua 16' c Goneva (2) 25' c, 33' m M. Wilson 45' c Mavinga 52' c Con: Flood (4/5) 17, 26', 45', 53'

Welford Road
Attendance: 20,045
Referee: Matthew Carley

8 September 2018
15:00

(1 BP) Saracens	44 – 23	Bristol Bears
Try: Gallagher 4' c Lewington 43' m B. Vunipola 49' c L. Williams (3) 52' m, 69' c, 76' c Con: Farrell (4/6) 5', 50', 69', 78'; Pen: Farrell (2/2) 32', 39'	Report	Try: Leiua (2) 10' c, 40' m Haining 72' m Con: Sheedy (1/2) 11'; Pen: Sheedy (2/2) 20', 27'

Allianz Park
Attendance: 8,736
Referee: Andrew Jackson

8 September 2018
16:30

(1 BP) Bath	31 – 31	Gloucester (1 BP)
Try: Rokoduguni 39' c Dunn (2) 42' c, 63' c Stooke 73' c Con: Burns (2/2) 40', 43'; Priestland (2/2) 63', 75'; Pen: Priestland (1/1) 71'	Report	Try: Ackermann (2) 14' c, 25' c Braley 33' c Banahan 77' c Con: Twelvetrees (4/4) 15', 26', 34', 78'; Pen: Twelvetrees (1/1) 69'

Recreation Ground
Attendance: 14,278
Referee: Luke Pearce

9 September 2018
15:00

Sale Sharks	21 – 15	Worcester Warriors (1 BP)
Try: Beaumont 19' m Solomona 32' c Con: MacGinty (1/2) 34'; Pen: MacGinty (3/3) 6', 30', 54'	Report	Try: Heem 46' c Pennell 60' m Con: Weir (1/2) 47'; Pen: Weir (1/1) 51'

AJ Bell Stadium
Attendance: 7,145
Referee: JP Doyle

==== Round 3 ====
14 September 2018
19:45

(1 BP) Gloucester	35 – 13	Bristol Bears
Try: Grobler 41' c Sharples (2) 48' c, 54' m Slater 63' m Banahan 80' m Con: Twelvetrees (2/5) 41', 48'; Pen: Twelvetrees (2/2) 8', 69'	Report	Try: Morahan 16' c Con: Madigan (1/1) 18'; Pen: Madigan (2/2) 10', 29'

Kingsholm
Attendance: 14,197
Referee: Tom Foley

15 September 2018
15:00

(1 BP) Exeter Chiefs	35 – 18	Sale Sharks
Try: Cordero 6' c J. Hill 25' c Maunder 49' c Cuthbert 62' c Lawday 73' c Con: J. Simmonds (3/3) 7', 26', 50'; Steenson (2/2) 64', 74'	Report	Try: Yarde 18' c B. Evans 60' m Con: MacGinty (1/2) 19'; Pen: MacGinty (2/3) 2', 15'

Sandy Park
Attendance: 9,073
Referee: Karl Dickson

15 September 2018
15:00

(2 BP) Harlequins	32 – 37	Bath (1 BP)
Try: Care 14' c Marchant 19' m Marler 75' c Mulchrone 79' c Con: M. Smith (1/2) 15'; Lang (2/2) 75', 79'; Pen: M. Smith (2/2) 13', 49'	Report	Try: Roberts 10' m Mercer (2) 23' c, 56' c Cokanasiga (2) 36' c, 45' m Con: Burns (2/4) 24', 36'; Priestland (1/1) 57'; Pen: Burns (1/2) 28'; Drop: Burns (1/1) 33'

Twickenham Stoop
Attendance: 11,897
Referee: Matthew Carley

15 September 2018
15:00

Northampton Saints	27 – 38	Saracens (1 BP)
Try: Francis 15' c Hartley 54' c Franks 62' c Con: Biggar (3/3) 16', 55', 63'; Pen: Biggar (2/2) 24', 69'	Report	Try: Lewington (2) 26' m, 31' m B. Spencer 42' c Strettle (2) 71' c, 74' m Con: B. Spencer (1/3) 43'; Goode (1/2) 72'; Pen: B. Spencer (1/1) 48'; Goode (2/2) 60' 66'

Franklin's Gardens
Attendance: 12,317
Referee: JP Doyle

15 September 2018
15:00

(1 BP) Worcester Warriors	20 – 23	Newcastle Falcons
Try: Penalty try 40+2'; Weir 49' c Con: Weir (1/1) 50'; Pen: Weir (1/1) 21'; Pennell (1/1) 68'	Report	Try: Takulua 5' c Sinoti 11' c Con: Flood (2/2) 6', 12'; Pen: Flood (3/3) 44', 56', 72'

Sixways
Attendance: 5,641
Referee: Wayne Barnes

16 September 2018
15:00

(1 BP) Wasps	41 – 35	Leicester Tigers (2 BP)
Try: De Jongh (2) 9' c, 54' c Bassett 14' c Hughes 22' m Con: Sopoaga (3/4) 10', 15', 55'; Pen: Sopoaga (4/4) 32', 66', 72', 79'; Daly (1/1) 40'	Report	Try: May (2) 17' m, 56' c Veainu 36' c Kalamafoni 48' c Con: G. Ford (3/4) 37', 49', 57'; Pen: G. Ford (3/4) 26', 30', 42'

Ricoh Arena
Attendance: 18,102
Referee: Ian Tempest

==== Round 4 ====
21 September 2018
19:45

(1 BP) Newcastle Falcons	17 – 24	Exeter Chiefs
Try: Kibirige 1' c J. Williams 51' c Con: Flood (2/2) 2', 53'; Pen: Flood (1/1) 37'	Report	Try: S. Simmonds (2) 5' c, 33' c Kvesic 64' c Con: J. Simmonds (2/2) 5', 34'; Steenson (1/1) 66'; Pen: J. Simmonds (1/1) 43'

Kingston Park
Attendance: 7,022
Referee: Andrew Jackson

22 September 2018
15:00

Sale Sharks	13 – 31	Wasps (1 BP)
Try: Ross 1' c Con: MacGinty (1/1) 2'; Pen: MacGinty (2/2) 13', 45'	Report	Try: Carr 34' c Bassett 38' c Stuart 52' c Hughes 77' c Con: Sopoaga (4/4) 35', 40', 53', 78'; Pen: Sopoaga (1/2) 8'

AJ Bell Stadium
Attendance: 6,340
Referee: Wayne Barnes

22 September 2018
15:00

Bristol Bears	20 – 13	Harlequins (1 BP)
Try: O'Conor 35' m Pen: Madigan (5/5) 19', 42', 49', 53', 59'	Report	Try: Care 7' c Con: Lang (1/1) 8'; Pen: Lang (2/2) 15', 56'

Ashton Gate
Attendance: 12,287
Referee: Ian Tempest

22 September 2018
15:00

Bath	17 – 15	Northampton Saints (1 BP)
Try: Burns 28' c Cokanasiga 62' c Con: Burns (2/2) 29', 63'; Pen: Burns (1/3) 54'	Report	Try: Reinach 18' c Collins 78' m Con: Biggar (1/2) 19'; Pen: Biggar (1/1) 72'

Recreation Ground
Attendance: 14,150
Referee: Karl Dickson

23 September 2018
15:00

(2 BP) Leicester Tigers	37 – 44	Worcester Warriors (1 BP)
Try: Thompson 26' m May 57' m Denton 62' c Kalamafoni 68' c G. Ford 75' c Con: G. Ford (3/5) 62', 69', 75'; Pen: G. Ford (2/2) 11', 16'	Report	Try: Weir (2) 1' c, 4' c Singleton 22' m Pennell 33' m T. Hill (2) 52' c, 78' c Con: Weir (3/5) 2', 5', 80'; Pennell (1/1) 53'; Pen: Weir (2/2) 11', 16'

Welford Road
Attendance: 18,444
Referee: Luke Pearce

23 September 2018
15:00

(1 BP) Saracens	38 – 15	Gloucester
Try: Strettle 5' c Itoje (2) 26' c, 38' c Maitland 52' c Lozowski 68' c Con: Farrell (5/5) 6', 27', 39', 54', 69'; Pen: Farrell (1/1) 3'	Report	Try: Atkinson 71' m Sharples 79' c Con: Twelvetrees (1/2) 80+1'; Pen: Twelvetrees (1/1) 35'

Allianz Park
Attendance: 8,591
Referee: Christophe Ridley

==== Round 5 ====
28 September 2018
19:45

(1 BP) Newcastle Falcons	22 – 23	Wasps
Try: M. Wilson 17'; J. Williams (2) 29' c, 46' c Con: Flood (2/3) 29', 47'; Pen: Flood (1/1) 36'	Report	Try: Bassett 11' m M. Watson 40+1' m De Jongh 59' c Con: Sopoaga (1/3) 59'; Pen: Sopoaga (2/4) 22', 71'

Kingston Park
Attendance: 6,904
Referee: Karl Dickson

29 September 2018
15:00

(2 BP) Bristol Bears	40 – 45	Northampton Saints (1 BP)
Try: Hurrell (2) 6' c, 67' m Thacker 30' c Morahan 47' c Leiua 80+1' m Con: Sheedy (3/3) 7', 31', 49'; Pen: Sheedy (3/3) 24', 39', 54'	Report	Try: Painter 13' c Kellaway 20' c Ludlam 36' c Naiyaravoro 43' c Waller 58' c Haywood 62' c Con: Biggar (5/5) 14', 21', 36', 45', 59'; Mallinder (1/1) 64'; Pen: Biggar (1/1) 5'

Ashton Gate
Attendance: 14,684
Referee: Luke Pearce

29 September 2018
15:00

(1 BP) Exeter Chiefs	28 – 11	Worcester Warriors
Try: Yeandle 24' c Ewers (2) 31' c, 39' c H. Williams 72' c Con: Steenson (4/4) 25', 32', 40', 72'	Report	Try: T. Hill 50' m Pen: Pennell (2/2) 17', 43'

Sandy Park
Attendance: 9,730
Referee: Ian Tempest

29 September 2018
15:00

(1 BP) Gloucester	25 – 27	Harlequins
Try: Cipriani 12' m Sharples (2) 37' c, 67' c Con: Cipriani (2/3) 38', 68'; Pen: Cipriani (2/2) 28', 34'	Report	Try: Earle (2) 16' m, 18' c Con: Lang (1/2) 19'; Pen: Lang (2/3) 41', 45'; M. Smith (3/4) 58', 65', 78'

Kingsholm
Attendance: 13,232
Referee: JP Doyle

29 September 2018
15:00

(1 BP) Saracens	50 – 27	Bath
Try: L. Williams (3) 11' m, 41' c, 52' m Goode 14' c George 29' c Tompkins 37' c Maitland 66' m Tolofua 77' c Con: Farrell (5/8) 15', 30', 38', 42', 78'	Report	Try: Cook 33' c Homer (2) 40' c, 61' c Con: Priestland (2/2) 34', 40+1'; Burns (1/1) 62'; Pen: Priestland (2/2) 2', 26'

Allianz Park
Attendance: 8,493
Referee: Tom Foley

30 September 2018
15:00

Leicester Tigers	19 – 15	Sale Sharks (1 BP)
Try: Eastmond 12' c Con: G. Ford (1/1) 13'; Pen: G. Ford (4/4) 23', 37', 68', 76'	Report	Try: Yarde 4' m Webber 61' m Langdon 78' m

Welford Road
Attendance: 18,652
Referee: Craig Maxwell-Keys

==== Round 6 ====
5 October 2018
19:45

Bath	24 – 39	Exeter Chiefs (1 BP)
Try: Priestland 22' c Cook 74' m Con: Burns (1/2) 22'; Pen: Burns (4/4) 11', 33', 43', 52'	Report	Try: Townsend 28' c Armand 35' m Kvesic 61' c Whitten 65' c Nowell 70' c Con: Steenson (4/5) 29', 62', 66', 72'; Pen: Steenson (2/2) 26', 46'

Recreation Ground
Attendance: 14,301
Referee: Christophe Ridley

6 October 2018
15:00

Northampton Saints	15 – 23	Leicester Tigers
Try: Gibson 14' m Ribbans 45' m Haywood 68' m	Report	Try: B. Youngs 30' c Olowofela 32' c Con: G. Ford (2/2) 30', 33'; Pen: G. Ford (3/4) 3', 24', 56'

Twickenham Stadium
Attendance: 40,013
Referee: JP Doyle

6 October 2018
15:00

Sale Sharks	20 – 7	Newcastle Falcons
Try: Phillips 53'; B. Evans 65' m Janse van Rensburg 72' m Con: MacGinty (1/3) 53'; Pen: MacGinty (1/1) 33'	Report	Try: Welch 36' c Con: Hodgson (1/1) 38'

AJ Bell Stadium
Attendance: 5,586
Referee: Tom Foley

6 October 2018
15:00

Wasps	21 – 35	Gloucester (1 BP)
Try: Robson 2' c Daly 46' c De Jongh 61' c Con: Searle (3/3) 3', 46', 62'	Report	Try: Vellacott 14' c Sharples (2) 23' c, 70' m Ludlow 73' c Con: Cipriani (3/4) 15', 24', 74'; Pen: Cipriani (3/4) 22', 37', 56'

Ricoh Arena
Attendance: 15,401
Referee: Craig Maxwell-Keys

6 October 2018
19:30

(1 BP) Harlequins	20 – 25	Saracens
Try: Care 34' c Marchant 53' c Con: M. Smith (2/2) 35', 53'; Pen: M. Smith (2/3) 7', 33'	Report	Try: B. Vunipola 68' c Con: Farrell (1/1) 69'; Pen: Farrell (6/7) 16', 29', 41', 47', 65', 73'

Twickenham Stoop
Attendance: 13,950
Referee: Luke Pearce

7 October 2018
15:00

(1 BP) Worcester Warriors	52 – 7	Bristol Bears
Try: Van Velze 12' c Mills 25' c Mama 33' c Venter 38' c Pennell 42' c Adams 46' c Heem 78' c Con: Weir (6/6) 14', 26', 35', 40', 43', 47', 80'; Pen: Pennell (1/1) 8'	Report	Try: Y. Thomas 2' c Con: Madigan (1/1) 4'

Sixways
Attendance: 9,172
Referee: Wayne Barnes

==== Round 7 ====
16 November 2018
19:45

(1 BP) Gloucester	36 – 13	Leicester Tigers
Try: Woodward 15' c Banahan 24' m Balmain 36' c Thorley (2) 45' c, 78' c Con: Cipriani (3/4) 16', 37', 47'; Twelvetrees (1/1) 79'; Pen: Cipriani (1/2) 2'	Report	Try: M. Williams 53' c Con: J. Ford (1/1) 54'; Pen: J. Ford (2/3) 6', 20'

Kingsholm
Attendance: 13,381
Referee: Ian Tempest

16 November 2018
19:45

Harlequins	20 – 7	Newcastle Falcons
Try: Dombrandt 36' c Saili 62' c Con: M. Smith (1/1) 37'; Lang (1/1) 63'; Pen: M. Smith (2/2) 21', 51'	Report	Try: Davidson 67' c Con: Flood (1/1) 68'

Twickenham Stoop
Attendance: 9,847
Referee: JP Doyle

17 November 2018
12:45

Bath	28 – 13	Worcester Warriors
Try: Rokoduguni 19' c Ellis 46' c Stooke 77' m Con: Burns (2/3) 20', 47'; Pen: Burns (3/3) 9', 28', 35	Report	Try: Mills 24' c Con: Weir (1/1) 25'; Pen: Weir (2/2) 5', 52'

Recreation Ground
Attendance: 14,072
Referee: Christophe Ridley

17 November 2018
13:00

(1 BP) Northampton Saints	36 – 17	Wasps
Try: Kellaway 5' m Dingwall 37' m Francis 43' m Naiyaravoro (2) 54' m, 69' c Con: Francis (1/2) 70'; Pen: Grayson (2/2) 18', 36'; Francis (1/1) 64'	Report	Try: T. Young 50' c Bassett 73' c Con: Sopoaga (1/1) 51'; Searle (1/1) 74'; Pen: Sopoaga (1/2) 40+1'

Franklin's Gardens
Attendance: 13,375
Referee: Matthew O’Grady

17 November 2018
13:00

(1 BP) Saracens	31 – 25	Sale Sharks (1 BP)
Try: Rhodes 19' c Lewington 29' c Tompkins 32' c Kpoku 73' c Con: Spencer (4/4) 20', 30', 33', 74'; Pen: Spencer (1/2) 80'	Report	Try: McGuigan 40' c Con: R. du Preez (1/1) 40+1'; Pen: R. du Preez (6/7) 4', 25', 54', 60', 63', 68'

Allianz Park
Attendance: 7,465
Referee: Andrew Jackson

18 November 2018
15:00

(1 BP) Bristol Bears	29 – 31	Exeter Chiefs (1 BP)
Try: C. Piutau 35' c Morahan 45' c Con: Sheedy (2/2) 37', 46'; Pen: Sheedy (5/6) 4', 15', 19', 26', 75'	Report	Try: Low 7' c Lawday 30' m Cordero 52' c Yeandle 70' m Penalty try 80+2'; Con: Steenson (2/4) 8', 53'

Ashton Gate
Attendance: 16,776
Referee: Greg Macdonald

==== Round 8 ====
23 November 2018
19:45

Newcastle Falcons	16 – 8	Bath
Try: J. Williams 38' c Con: Flood (1/1) 39'; Pen: Flood (3/4) 5', 56', 69'	Report	Try: McConnochie 26' m Pen: Atkins (1/1) 45'

Kingston Park
Attendance: 7,237
Referee: Christophe Ridley

23 November 2018
19:45

Worcester Warriors	20 – 13	Harlequins (1 BP)
Try: Schonert 31' c Mills 61' c Con: Weir (2/2) 32', 62'; Pen: Weir (1/1) 12'; Pennell (1/1) 40+2'	Report	Try: Marchant 55' c Con: Lang (1/1) 56'; Pen: M. Smith (1/3) 7'; Lang (1/2) 78'

Sixways
Attendance: 8,228
Referee: Andrew Jackson

24 November 2018
13:00

Exeter Chiefs	23 – 6	Gloucester
Try: White 32' c Cuthbert 42' c Con: Steenson (2/2) 33', 43'; Pen: Steenson (3/3) 23', 50', 76'	Report	Pen: Cipriani (2/3) 3', 12'

Sandy Park
Attendance: 12,772
Referee: Matthew O'Grady

24 November 2018
13:00

Sale Sharks	18 – 13	Northampton Saints (1 BP)
Try: Solomona (2) 7' c, 57' m Con: R. du Preez (1/2) 8'; Pen: R. du Preez (2/2) 44', 74'	Report	Try: Reinach 1' m Sleightholme 53' m Pen: Grayson (1/2) 78'

AJ Bell Stadium
Attendance: 5,290
Referee: JP Doyle

24 November 2018
13:00

(1 BP) Wasps	32 – 28	Bristol Bears (2 BP)
Try: Neal (2) 3' m, 46' c de Jongh 6' c Gaskell 44' c Con: Sopoaga (3/4) 7', 44', 47'; Pen: Sopoaga (2/2) 24', 37'	Report	Try: Edwards 14' c Thacker (3) 56' c, 60' c, 72' c Con: Sheedy (2/2) 15', 57'; Madigan (2/2) 61', 72'

Ricoh Arena
Attendance: 11,640
Referee: Craig Maxwell-Keys

25 November 2018
15:00

(1 BP) Leicester Tigers	22 – 27	Saracens
Try: O'Connor (2) 46' c, 66' m M. Smith 69' c Con: J. Ford (2/3) 47', 68'; Pen: J. Ford (1/1) 4'	Report	Try: Spencer 25' c Lewington 28' c Lozowski 30' c Con: Spencer (3/3) 26', 29', 31'; Pen: Spencer (2/2) 58', 77'

Welford Road
Attendance: 20,700
Referee: Karl Dickson

==== Round 9 ====
30 November 2018
19:45

(1 BP) Harlequins	28 – 26	Exeter Chiefs (2 BP)
Try: J. Chisholm 28' m Earle (2) 39' m, 56' c Marchant 75' m Con: Lang (1/3) 57'; Pen: Lang (1/1) 6'; Smith (1/1) 67'	Report	Try: Kvesic 12' m Yeandle 49' c Devoto 61' c Whitten 78' c Con: J. Simmonds (1/2) 51'; Steenson (2/2) 62', 78'

Twickenham Stoop
Attendance: 14,800
Referee: Ian Tempest

1 December 2018
13:00

(1 BP) Bristol Bears	41 – 10	Leicester Tigers
Try: Thacker (2) 1' c, 33' m Morahan 44' c Randall 49' c Con: Madigan (3/4) 2', 45', 50'; Pen: Madigan (5/5) 9', 25', 32', 55', 58'	Report	Try: Tuilagi 15' c Con: G. Ford (1/1) 17'; Pen: G. Ford (1/1) 28'

Ashton Gate
Attendance: 12,237
Referee: Wayne Barnes

1 December 2018
15:00

(1 BP) Gloucester	36 – 16	Worcester Warriors
Try: Hanson 12' m Sharples 17' m Thorley (2) 46' m, 60' c Clarke 52' c Visagie 57' c Con: Twelvetrees (3/4) 52', 58', 61'	Report	Try: Heem 64' c Con: Weir (1/1) 65'; Pen: Weir (3/3) 21', 28', 33'

Kingsholm
Attendance: 15,387
Referee: Thomas Foley

1 December 2018
15:00

(1 BP) Northampton Saints	14 – 16	Newcastle Falcons
Try: Reinach (2) 29' c, 48' c Con: Biggar (2/2) 30', 49'	Report	Try: M. Wilson 80+6' c Con: Flood (1/1) 80+8'; Pen: Flood (2/2) 2', 25'; Connon (1/1) 70'

Franklin's Gardens
Attendance: 12,326
Referee: Matthew Carley

1 December 2018
15:00

Saracens	29 – 6	Wasps
Try: George 58' c Isiekwe 70' c Con: Lozowski (2/2) 60', 71'; Pen: Lozowski (5/5) 11', 27', 36', 56', 67'	Report	Pen: Daly (2/2) 17', 48'

Allianz Park
Attendance: 9,827
Referee: JP Doyle

2 December 2018
15:00

Bath	7 – 7	Sale Sharks
Try: Cokanasiga 71' c Con: Jam. Wilson (1/1) 72'	Report	Try: J. du Preez; Con: R. du Preez (1/1) 49'

Recreation Ground
Attendance: 13,390
Referee: Luke Pearce

==== Round 10 ====
21 December 2018
19:45

Worcester Warriors	6 – 32	Northampton Saints
Pen: Weir (2/4) 25', 43'	Report	Try: Reinach 56' c Burrell 76' c Con: Francis (1/1) 57'; Biggar (1/1) 77'; Pen: Biggar (6/6) 7', 15', 21', 34', 69', 75'

Sixways
Attendance: 8,404
Referee: Wayne Barnes

22 December 2018
15:00

(1 BP) Leicester Tigers	35 – 24	Harlequins
Try: Holmes (2) 13' c, 28' c Tuilagi 55' m May 67' c Con: G. Ford (3/4) 15', 29', 68'; Pen: G. Ford (3/3) 6', 27', 40+5'	Report	Try: Murley 62' c Dombrandt 79'; Con: Lang (1/1) 63'; Pen: Lang (1/1) 19', 23', 33', 44'

Welford Road
Attendance: 21,597
Referee: Luke Pearce

22 December 2018
15:00

(1 BP) Exeter Chiefs	31 – 13	Saracens
Try: Cowan-Dickie 21' c H. Williams 63' c Penalty try 67'; Kvesic 79' c Con: Steenson (2/2) 22', 64'; J. Simmonds (1/1) 80'; Pen: Steenson (1/1) 40'	Report	Try: Spencer 75' c Con: Farrell (1/1) 76'; Pen: Farrell (2/3) 5', 10'

Sandy Park
Attendance: 12,791
Referee: Thomas Foley

22 December 2018
15:00

Sale Sharks	27 – 10	Bristol Bears
Try: Solomona 23' m Cliff 78' c Con: R. du Preez (1/2) 79'; Pen: R. du Preez (5/5) 15', 31', 39', 47', 60'	Report	Try: Luatua 68' c Con: Sheedy (1/1) 69'; Pen: Madigan (1/2) 2'

AJ Bell Stadium
Attendance: 7,465
Referee: JP Doyle

23 December 2018
15:00

Wasps	14 – 24	Bath
Try: T. Young 55' m Pen: Searle (3/3) 2', 14', 40+1'	Report	Try: Burns 25' m Chudley 52' c Con: Burns (1/2) 53'; Pen: Burns (4/5) 12', 22', 38', 42'

Ricoh Arena
Attendance: 31,626
Referee: Matthew Carley

23 December 2018
15:00

(1 BP) Newcastle Falcons	17 – 20	Gloucester
Try: Goneva 41' m Pen: Takulua (4/4) 16', 28', 51', 57'	Report	Try: Slater 40+1' c Morgan 61' c Con: Twelvetrees (2/2) 40+1', 62' c Pen: Twelvetrees (2/2) 5', 74'

Kingston Park
Attendance: 9,024
Referee: Karl Dickson

==== Round 11 ====
28 December 2018
19:45

(1 BP) Northampton Saints	31 – 28	Exeter Chiefs (2 BP)
Try: Francis 1' c Biggar 8' c Dingwall 32' c Reinach 56' c Con: Biggar (4/4) 2', 9', 33', 56'; Pen: Biggar (1/1) 62'	Report	Try: Penalty try 21'; Cordero 28' c Moon 44' c Kvesic 80+1' c Con: Steenson (3/3) 29', 44', 80+2'

Franklin's Gardens
Attendance: 15,005
Referee: Ian Tempest

29 December 2018
15:00

Gloucester	15 – 30	Sale Sharks (1 BP)
Try: Visagie 15' c Banahan 72' m Con: Twelvetrees (1/1) 16'; Pen: Twelvetrees (1/1) 7'	Report	Try: Ashton 19' c de Klerk 29' c Webber 52' m Solomona 59' m Con: R. du Preez (2/4) 20', 30'; Pen: R. du Preez (2/2) 40', 49'

Kingsholm
Attendance: 15,879
Referee: Christophe Ridley

29 December 2018
15:00

Saracens	25 – 17	Worcester Warriors
Try: M. Vunipola 29' m C. Clark 52' c Strettle 66' c Con: Farrell (2/3) 53', 67'; Pen: Farrell (2/3) 21', 40+1'	Report	Try: Weir 3' c Te'o 11' c Con: Weir (2/2) 4', 12'; Pen: Weir (1/2) 33'

Allianz Park
Attendance: 9,758
Referee: Karl Dickson

29 December 2018
16:00

Harlequins	20 – 13	Wasps (1 BP)
Try: Dombrandt 0' c Marchant 63' c Con: M. Smith (2/2) 2', 64'; Pen: M. Smith (2/2) 18', 37'	Report	Try: Stuart 57' c Con: Sopoaga (1/1) 58'; Pen: Daly (1/1) 31'; Sopoaga (1/2) 68'

Twickenham
Attendance: 82,000
Referee: Craig Maxwell-Keys

30 December 2018
15:00

(1 BP) Bristol Bears	35 – 28	Newcastle Falcons (1 BP)
Try: Randall 1' c C. Piutau 47' c Morohan 52' m Pincus 75' c Con: Madigan (2/3) 3', 48'; Sheedy (1/1) 77'; Pen: Madigan (2/2) 32', 58'; Sheedy (1/1) 69'	Report	Try: Goneva 21' c Chick 34' c Radwan 64' m Con: Flood (2/3) 21', 35'; Pen: Flood (3/3) 9', 29', 73'

Ashton Gate
Attendance: 18,429
Referee: Wayne Barnes

30 December 2018
15:00

Bath	23 – 16	Leicester Tigers (1 BP)
Try: Roberts 26' c Catt 32' m McConnochie 54' m Con: Burns (1/3) 28'; Pen: Burns (1/1) 20'; Priestland (1/1) 72'	Report	Try: May 1' c Con: G. Ford (1/1) 3'; Pen: G. Ford (3/3) 53', 69', 76'

Recreation Ground
Attendance: 14,509
Referee: JP Doyle

==== Round 12 ====
4 January 2019
19:45

Sale Sharks	24 – 18	Saracens (1 BP)
Try: James 14' m Solomona 18' c Con: R. du Preez (1/2) 19'; Pen: R. du Preez (4/5) 9', 39', 62', 71'	Report	Try: B. Vunipola 6' c Tompkins 79' m Con: Farrell (1/2) 7'; Pen: Farrell (2/2) 11', 29'

AJ Bell Stadium
Attendance: 8,535
Referee: Matthew Carley

5 January 2019
15:00

Worcester Warriors	21 – 19	Bath (1 BP)
Try: Heem (2) 57' m, 80+17' c Con: Weir (1/2) 80+18'; Pen: Weir (3/3) 27', 47', 66'	Report	Try: Mercer 32' c Con: Burns (1/1) 33'; Pen: Burns (4/4) 8', 16', 20', 37'

Sixways
Attendance: 8,724
Referee: Ian Tempest

5 January 2019
15:00

Newcastle Falcons	17 – 38	Harlequins (1 BP)
Try: Goneva 49' c Chick 62' c Con: Connon (2/2) 50', 63'; Pen: Connon (1/2) 7'	Report	Try: Crumpton 3' c N. Earle 15' c Ibitoye 34' c Clifford 43' c Dombrandt 45' c Con: M. Smith (5/5) 4', 16', 35', 44', 46'; Pen: M. Smith (1/1) 70'

Kingston Park
Attendance: 7,212
Referee: Tom Foley

5 January 2019
15:00

Exeter Chiefs	14 – 9	Bristol Bears (1 BP)
Try: Cordero 39' c Lonsdale 65' c Con: Steenson (1/1) 40'; J. Simmonds (1/1) 66'	Report	Pen: Madigan (3/3) 12', 48', 55'

Sandy Park
Attendance: 12,788
Referee: Craig Maxwell-Keys

5 January 2019
15:00

(1 BP) Leicester Tigers	34 – 16	Gloucester
Try: May (2) 10' c, 52' c Holmes 43' c G. Ford 63' c Con: G. Ford (4/4) 11', 44', 53', 63'; Pen: G. Ford (2/2) 2', 19'	Report	Try: G. Evans 54' c Con: Twelvetrees (1/1) 54'; Pen: Twelvetrees (3/3) 21', 37', 61'

Welford Road
Attendance: 20,329
Referee: Wayne Barnes

6 January 2019
15:00

Wasps	27 – 16	Northampton Saints
Try: Bassett 16' c de Jongh 21' c le Roux 53' c Con: Sopoaga (3/3) 18', 23', 54'; Pen: Sopoaga (2/2) 32', 63'	Report	Try: Dingwall 24' c Con: Biggar (1/1) 25'; Pen: Biggar (3/3) 20', 35', 39'

Ricoh Arena
Attendance: 16,215
Referee: Luke Pearce

==== Round 13 ====
15 February 2019
19:45

Gloucester	24 – 17	Exeter Chiefs (1 BP)
Try: Woodward 25' c Heinz 49' c Morgan 75' c Con: Twelvetrees (3/3) 27', 51', 77'; Pen: Twelvetrees (1/3) 12'	Report	Try: White 7' c O'Flaherty 62' c Con: J. Simmonds (1/1) 9'; Steenson (1/1) 64'; Pen: J. Simmonds (1/1) 47'

Kingsholm
Attendance: 13,658
Referee: Craig Maxwell-Keys

15 February 2019
19:45

(1 BP) Bristol Bears	22 – 29	Wasps (1 BP)
Try: Randall 43' c P. O'Conor 54' c C. Piutau 57' m Con: Madigan (1/1) 44'; Sheedy (1/2) 54'; Pen: Madigan (1/1) 7'	Report	Try: T. Young 10' c Cruse 34' m Carr 38' c Rowlands 51' c Con: Searle (2/3) 11', 40'; Sopoaga (1/1) 51'; Pen: Sopoaga (1/1) 65'

Ashton Gate
Attendance: 12,368
Referee: Wayne Barnes

16 February 2019
14:00

(1 BP) Northampton Saints	67 – 17	Sale Sharks
Try: Reinach (2) 6' c, 11' c Wood 26' c Collins (2) 38' m, 77' c Tuala 41' c Naiyaravoro 60' c Furbank 64' c Hutchinson 72' c Con: Biggar (2/2) 6', 12'; Francis (6/7) 26', 42', 61', 65', 73', 78'; Pen: Biggar (2/2) 2', 10'	Report	Try: Penalty try 33'; Solomona 48' c Con: MacGinty (1/1) 49'; Pen: MacGinty (1/1) 9'

Franklin's Gardens
Attendance: 12,447
Referee: Karl Dickson

16 February 2019
15:00

(1 BP) Bath	30 – 13	Newcastle Falcons
Try: Rokoduguni 22' m Cokanasiga 31' m Chudley 40' c Louw 72' c Con: Priestland (2/4) 40+1', 73'; Pen: Priestland (2/2) 7', 64'	Report	Try: Nagusa 49' c Con: Flood (1/1) 50'; Pen: Flood (2/2) 10', 27'

Recreation Ground
Attendance: 14,331
Referee: JP Doyle

16 February 2019
15:00

(1 BP) Harlequins	47 – 33	Worcester Warriors (1 BP)
Try: Marchant 0' c Ibitoye 6' c Brown 17' c Clifford 34' c Care 53' c Tapuai 69' c Lang 74' m Con: M. Smith (4/4) 1', 7', 18', 36'; Lang (2/3) 54', 70'	Report	Try: Singleton 26' c Heem 49' m Adams 65' c Heaney 72' c Howe 79' c Con: Weir (1/2) 27'; Pennell (3/3) 66', 72', 79'

Twickenham Stoop
Attendance: 12,235
Referee: Luke Pearce

16 February 2019
15:00

(1 BP) Saracens	33 – 10	Leicester Tigers
Try: Wigglesworth 11' m Woolstencroft 65' c Spencer 76' c Strettle 78' m Con: Goode (2/3) 66', 77'; Pen: Lozowski (2/2) 54', 62'; Goode (1/2) 72'	Report	Try: Holmes 39' c Con: To'omua (1/1) 40'; Pen: To'omua (1/3) 10'

Allianz Park
Attendance: 9,875
Referee: Tom Foley

==== Round 14 ====
22 February 2019
19:45

Gloucester	30 – 24	Saracens (1 BP)
Try: Morgan (2) 20' c, 72' c Slater 53' c Con: Twelvetrees (3/3) 21', 54', 73'; Pen: Twelvetrees (3/4) 7', 26', 34'	Report	Try: Rhodes 61' c Gallagher 77' c Wray 80+1' c Con: Lozowski (3/3) 62', 78', 80+2'; Pen: Lozowski (1/2) 28'

Kingsholm
Attendance: 13,633
Referee: JP Doyle

23 February 2019
14:00

(1 BP) Harlequins	36 – 26	Bristol Bears (1 BP)
Try: R. Chisholm 12' c M. Smith 23' c Brown 30' m Marchant 35' c Earle 75' c Con: M. Smith (3/4) 13', 24', 36; Lang (1/1) 76'; Pen: Lang (1/1) 67'	Report	Try: C. Piutau 10' c Leiua (2) 17' m, 79' c Sheedy 60' c Con: Sheedy (2/3) 11', 61'; Madigan (1/1) 79'

Twickenham Stoop
Attendance: 13,167
Referee: Tom Foley

23 February 2019
14:00

(1 BP) Wasps	18 – 24	Sale Sharks
Try: Johnson 27' m Simpson 52' c Con: Sopoaga (1/2) 53'; Pen: Sopoaga (1/1) 37'; Miller (1/1) 73'	Report	Try: Webber 10' c Solomona 21' c Penalty try 55'; Con: de Klerk (2/2) 11', 23'; Pen: de Klerk (1/2) 41'

Ricoh Arena
Attendance: 12,085
Referee: Andrew Jackson

23 February 2019
14:30

(1 BP) Exeter Chiefs	35 – 17	Newcastle Falcons
Try: Cordero 7' c Yeandle 16' c Woodburn 24' c White 45' c G. Holmes 63' c Con: Steenson (5/5) 8', 17', 25', 46', 64'	Report	Try: Takalua 19' c Kibirige (2) 49' m, 79' m Con: Flood (1/3) 20'

Sandy Park
Attendance: 12,713
Referee: Luke Pearce

23 February 2019
14:45

Northampton Saints	27 – 26	Bath (1 BP)
Try: Hutchinson 44' c Mitchell 64' c Ribbans 80+1' c Con: Grayson (3/3) 45', 64', 80+2'; Pen: Grayson (2/2) 16', 55'	Report	Try: McConnochie 29' c Mercer 48' c Con: Priestland (2/2) 30', 49'; Pen: Priestland (4/4) 43', 61', 70', 73'

Franklin's Gardens
Attendance: 12,289
Referee: Ian Tempest

24 February 2019
13:00

Worcester Warriors	17 – 13	Leicester Tigers
Try: Hougaard 45' c Howe 78' c Con: Weir (2/2) 46', 80'; Pen: Weir (1/3) 23'	Report	Try: J. Holmes 29' c Con: To'omua (1/1) 30'; Pen: To'omua (1/1) 14'; Hardwick (1/1) 65'

Sixways
Attendance: 7,487
Referee: Craig Maxwell-Keys

==== Round 15 ====
1 March 2019
19:45

Bristol Bears	28 – 24	Gloucester (1 BP)
Try: D. Thomas 1' m Uren 45' c Penalty try 65'; Con: Madigan (1/1) 47'; Pen: Sheedy (2/2) 24', 35'; Madigan (1/1) 78'	Report	Try: Woodward 15' c T. Marshall 55' c Thorley 57' c Con: Twelvetrees (3/3) 16', 56', 58'; Pen: Twelvetrees (1/2) 44'

Ashton Gate
Attendance: 16,911
Referee: Karl Dickson

2 March 2019
15:00

(1 BP) Bath	29 – 31	Harlequins (1 BP)
Try: Joseph 25' m Catt 40' m Batty 63' c Con: Priestland (1/3); Pen: Priestland (4/4)	Report	Try: Robshaw 7' c Marchant (2) 11' c, 70' m Dombrandt 32' c Earle 80' m Con: Lang (3/3) 8', 11', 33'

Recreation Ground
Attendance: 14,509
Referee: Matthew Carley

2 March 2019
15:00

Leicester Tigers	19 – 14	Wasps (1 BP)
Try: J. Ford 46' c Con: J. Ford (1/1) 47'; Pen: J. Ford (4/4) 18', 27', 40+2', 65'	Report	Try: M. Watson (2) 7' c, 29' c Con: Miller (2/2) 8', 30'

Welford Road
Attendance: 25,258 (Note: Leicester Tigers v Wasps attendance is incorrectly given as 23,258 on the Premiership Rugby website. Leicester Tigers website gives the correct figure of 25,258.)
Referee: JP Doyle

2 March 2019
15:00

(1 BP) Sale Sharks	14 – 20	Exeter Chiefs
Try: S. James 62' c Cliff 73' c Con: de Klerk (1/1) 63'; S. James (1/1) 73'	Report	Try: Devoto 20' c Armand 36' m Lonsdale 70' m Con: Steenson (1/3) 21'; Pen: Steenson (1/1) 4'

AJ Bell Stadium
Attendance: 6,407
Referee: Ian Tempest

2 March 2019
15:00

(1 BP) Saracens	36 – 17	Northampton Saints
Try: Maitland (2) 3' c, 27' m Tompkins 8' m Strettle 16' c Woolstencroft 34' m Penalty try 50'; Con: B. Spencer (2/5) 4', 17'	Report	Try: R. Marshall 57' c Ludlam 66' c Con: Hutchinson (2/2) 58', 67'; Pen: Hutchinson (1/1) 7'

Allianz Park
Attendance: 9,729
Referee: Luke Pearce

3 March 2019
15:00

Newcastle Falcons	17 – 6	Worcester Warriors
Try: Kibirige 5' c Flood 31' c Con: Flood (2/2) 6', 32'; Pen: Flood (1/2) 13'	Report	Pen: Weir (2/2) 10', 23'

Kingston Park
Attendance: 8,005
Referee: Wayne Barnes

==== Round 16 ====
8 March 2019
19:45

Bath	18 – 9	Saracens
Pen: Priestland (6/7) 4', 26', 37', 61', 74', 78'	Report	Pen: Lozowski (3/7) 11', 43', 51'

Recreation Ground
Attendance: 14,055
Referee: Andrew Jackson

8 March 2019
20:00

(1 BP) Sale Sharks	32 – 5	Leicester Tigers
Try: B. Evans 21' m Solomona 25' m Morozov 49' m Beaumont 59' m de Klerk 75' m Penalty try 80'	Report	Try: Gigena 5' m

AJ Bell Stadium
Attendance: 6,508
Referee: Matthew Carley

9 March 2019
14:00

(1 BP) Wasps	19 – 20	Newcastle Falcons
Try: B. Harris 67' c Con: Miller (1/1) 68'; Pen: Miller (4/4) 16', 36', 55', 64'	Report	Try: Nagusa 52' c Takulua 59' c Con: Takulua (2/2) 52', 59'; Pen: Takulua (1/1) 22'; Connon (1/1) 80+2'

Ricoh Arena
Attendance: 11,710
Referee: Thomas Foley

9 March 2019
14:45

(2 BP) Northampton Saints	24 – 26	Bristol Bears (1 BP)
Try: Naiyaravoro 29' m Tuala 44' m Furbank 47' c Reinach 56' c Con: Francis (2/4) 48', 56'	Report	Try: Batley 3' m Crane 15' c Randall 53' c P. O'Conor 80+6' c Con: Daniels (2/3) 16', 55'; Madigan (1/1) 80+7'

Franklin's Gardens
Attendance: 12,252
Referee: Christophe Ridley

9 March 2019
15:00

(2 BP) Worcester Warriors	30 – 33	Exeter Chiefs (1 BP)
Try: Heem 47' m T. Hill 55' c Howe 67' m Pennell 74' c Con: Pennell (2/3) 56', 75'; Pen: Weir (2/2) 8', 37'	Report	Try: Cordero (2) 12' m, 33' c Woodburn 39' c O'Flaherty 50' c H. Williams 61' c Con: Steenson (4/5) 34', 40', 51', 62'

Sixways
Attendance: 9,142
Referee: JP Doyle

10 March 2019
13:00

Harlequins	7 – 29	Gloucester (1 BP)
Try: Erle 75' c Con: M. Smith (1/1) 76'	Report	Try: Woodward 7' c Ackermann 11' c T. Marshall 51' m Cipriani 64' c Con: Twelvetrees (3/4) 9', 12', 65'; Pen: Twelvetrees (1/1) 35'

Twickenham Stoop
Attendance: 14,440
Referee: Wayne Barnes

==== Round 17 ====
22 March 2019
19:45

Leicester Tigers	15 – 29	Northampton Saints
Try: G. Ford 66' c T. Youngs 78' m Con: G. Ford (1/2) 67'; Pen: G. Ford (1/1) 22'	Report	Try: Reinach 5' m Collins (2) 32' c, 38' m Con: Biggar (1/3) 33'; Pen: Biggar (4/4) 30', 43', 51', 53'

Welford Road
Attendance: 23,322
Referee: Wayne Barnes

23 March 2019
15:00

(1 BP) Bristol Bears	25 – 27	Worcester Warriors
Try: Penalty try 4'; Morahan 18' m Sheedy 65' c Con: Sheedy (1/2) 66'; Pen: Sheedy (2/2) 26', 30'	Report	Try: T. Hill 14' c Te'o 22' c Adams 32' c Con: Weir (3/3), 15', 23', 33'; Pen: Weir (2/2) 35', 46'

Ashton Gate
Attendance: 14,930
Referee: Luke Pearce

23 March 2019
15:00

Gloucester	27 – 14	Wasps
Try: Heinz 32' c Ackermann 35' c Polledri 78' c Con: Twelvetrees (3/3) 33', 36', 80'; Pen: Twelvetrees (2/2) 45', 74'	Report	Try: M. Watson 15' m Pen: Miller (3/3) 5', 19', 63'

Kingsholm
Attendance: 14,671
Referee: Ian Tempest

23 March 2019
15:00

Saracens	27 – 20	Harlequins (1 BP)
Try: Burger 45' c Skelton (2) 57' c, 66' c Con: Lozowski (3/3) 46', 58', 66'; Pen: Lozowski (2/2) 35', 39'	Report	Try: M. Smith 31' c Care 40+1' c Con: M. Smith (2/2) 32', 40+2'; Pen: M. Smith (2/2) 9', 61'

London Stadium
Attendance: 42,717
Referee: JP Doyle

23 March 2019
17:30

Newcastle Falcons	22 – 17	Sale Sharks (1 BP)
Try: Flood 42' c Con: Takulua (1/1) 43'; Pen: Takulua (5/5) 16', 31', 46', 54', 62'	Report	Try: Solomona 5' c McGuigan 76' c Con: de Klerk (2/2) 6', 76'; Pen: de Klerk (1/2) 13'

St James' Park
Attendance: 27,284
Referee: Craig Maxwell-Keys

24 March 2019
15:00

(1 BP) Exeter Chiefs	29 – 10	Bath
Try: Devoto 25' c Yeandle 37' c Penalty try 59'; Woodburn 74' m Con: J. Simmonds (2/3) 27', 39'; Pen: J. Simmonds (1/1) 8'	Report	Try: Catt 14' c Con: Priestland (1/1) 15'; Pen: Priestland (1/1) 4'

Sandy Park
Attendance: 12,809
Referee: Karl Dickson

==== Round 18 ====
5 April 2019
19:45

Sale Sharks	28 – 17	Harlequins
Try: McGuigan 40' c Con: MacGinty (1/1) 40+1'; Pen: MacGinty (7/7) 13', 18', 23', 35', 43', 70', 76'	Report	Try: Brown 3' c Clifford 26' c Con: Catrakilis (2/2) 4', 27'; Pen: M. Smith (1/1) 56'

AJ Bell Stadium
Attendance: 5,418
Referee: Wayne Barnes

6 April 2019
14:00

(1 BP) Bath	26–19	Bristol Bears (1 BP)
Try: Joseph 1' c Roberts 9' m Cokanasiga 21' c Priestland 55' c Con: Priestland (3/4) 2', 22', 56'	Report	Try: D. Thomas 69' c Con: Madigan (1/1) 70'; Pen: Sheedy (4/4) 7', 30', 34', 40'

Twickenham
Attendance: 60,152
Referee: JP Doyle

6 April 2019
15:00

(1 BP) Saracens	26 – 12	Newcastle Falcons
Try: Maitland 33' m Malins 55' c Tompkins 68' c Lozowski 79' c Con: Farrell (3/4) 57', 69', 80+3'	Report	Pen: Takalua (4/4) 23', 38', 60', 75'

Allianz Park
Attendance: 9,056
Referee: Karl Dickson

6 April 2019
15:00

(1 BP) Wasps	28 – 16	Worcester Warriors
Try: Hughes (2) 5' c, 62' c M. Watson 10' c Zhvania 19' c Con: Sopoaga (4/4) 6', 12', 20', 62'	Report	Try: Lewis 24' c Con: Weir (1/1) 26'; Pen: Weir (2/3) 4', 40+2'; Pennell (1/1) 47'

Ricoh Arena
Attendance: 16,194
Referee: Matthew Carley

6 April 2019
16:30

Leicester Tigers	20 – 52	Exeter Chiefs (1 BP)
Try: May 23' c T. Youngs 40+3' c Con: G. Ford (2/2) 25', 40+4'; Pen: G. Ford (2/2) 16', 36'	Report	Try: Kvesic 9' c Yeandle 21' c Woodburn 26' c Slade 30' c Devoto 43' c Cordero 51' c Nowell 60' c Con: J. Simmonds (7/7) 10', 22', 27', 32', 44', 52', 61'; Pen: J. Simmonds (1/1) 41'

Welford Road
Attendance: 21,503
Referee: Thomas Foley

7 April 2019
15:00

(1 BP) Northampton Saints	31 – 40	Gloucester (1 BP)
Try: Naiyaravoro 5' m P. Francis 10' c Reinach 36' c R. Marshall 52' m Hutchinson 75' c Con: Biggar (2/4) 11', 37'; P. Francis (1/1) 76'	Report	Try: Atkinson (3) 8' c, 14' c, 38' m Ackermann 29' c Marais 64' c Con: Twelvetrees (5/6) 10', 14', 30', 44', 65'

Franklin's Gardens
Attendance: 13,445
Referee: Craig Maxwell-Keys

==== Round 19 ====
12 April 2019
19:45

(1 BP) Newcastle Falcons	22 – 27	Leicester Tigers
Try: C. Harris 32' c Takulua (2) 35' m, 54' c Con: Takulua (2/3) 33', 56'; Pen: Takulua (1/1) 63'	Report	Try: May 16' c Thompson (2) 47' c, 67' c Con: G. Ford (3/3) 17', 48', 69'; Pen: G. Ford (2/3) 2', 25'

Kingston Park
Attendance: 8,292
Referee: Wayne Barnes

13 April 2019
15:00

(1 BP) Gloucester	27 – 23	Bath (1 BP)
Try: Hohneck 40+3' c Ackermann 44' c Purdy 55' m Seabrook 62' m Con: Twelvetrees (2/4) 40+4', 45'; Pen: Twelvetrees (1/1) 68'	Report	Try: McConnochie 3' c Dunn 17' c Con: Burns (2/2) 4', 19'; Pen: Burns (2/2) 10', 48'; Drop: Burns 58'

Kingsholm
Attendance: 15,897
Referee: Matthew Carley

13 April 2019
15:00

(1 BP) Harlequins	19 – 20	Northampton Saints
Try: Clifford 46' c Con: M. Smith (1/1) 47'; Pen: M. Smith (4/5) 6', 15', 58', 73'	Report	Try: Tuala 12' c Mitchell 77' c Con: Biggar (1/1) 13'; Grayson (1/1) 79'; Pen: Biggar (2/2) 8', 20'

Twickenham Stoop
Attendance: 14,335
Referee: Christophe Ridley

13 April 2019
15:00

(1 BP) Worcester Warriors	39 – 17	Sale Sharks
Try: Lewis 5' c Pennell 16' c Adams (3) 52' c, 61' m, 77' c Con: Weir (4/5) 6', 17', 54', 79'; Pen: Weir (2/2) 10', 47'	Report	Try: Beaumont 27' c Postlethwaite 71' c Con: MacGinty (2/2) 29', 72'; Pen: MacGinty (1/1) 50'

Sixways
Attendance: 7,565
Referee: Ian Tempest

13 April 2019
17:30

Bristol Bears	23 – 21	Saracens (1 BP)
Try: Luatua 45' c D. Thomas 62' c Con: Sheedy (2/2) 46', 64'; Pen: Sheedy (2/3) 12', 39'; Madigan (1/1) 80+1'	Report	Try: Whiteley 8' c Bosch 55' c Adams-Hale 68' c Con: Goode (3/3) 9', 56', 68'

Ashton Gate
Attendance: 14,798
Referee: Tom Foley

14 April 2019
15:00

(1 BP) Exeter Chiefs	19 – 26	Wasps (1 BP)
Try: Nowell 6' m White 21' c Yeandle 68' c Con: J. Simmonds (2/3) 21', 69'	Report	Try: le Roux 30' c de Jongh 35' c M. Watson 40+1' c Zhvania 60' m Con: Daly (1/1) 32'; Sopoaga (2/3) 37', 40+1'

Sandy Park
Attendance: 12,909
Referee: Luke Pearce

==== Round 20 ====
26 April 2019
19:45

Newcastle Falcons	17 – 31	Northampton Saints (1 BP)
Try: Ah You 47' c Takulua 54' c Con: Takulua (2/2) 48', 54'; Pen: Takulua (1/1) 5'	Report	Try: Collins (3) 8' c, 15' c, 36' c Mitchell 77' c Con: Biggar (4/4) 8', 16', 38', 78'; Pen: Biggar (1/1) 13'

Kingston Park
Attendance: 6,389
Referee: Luke Pearce

26 April 2019
19:45

Sale Sharks	6 – 3	Bath (1 BP)
Pen: MacGinty (2/3) 30', 65'	Report	Pen: Burns (1/3) 9'

AJ Bell Stadium
Attendance: 5,901
Referee: Thomas Foley

27 April 2019
14:00

Exeter Chiefs	17 – 15	Harlequins (1 BP)
Try: Devoto 1' c White 10' m H. Williams 46' m Con: J. Simmonds (1/3) 2'	Report	Try: Hidalgo-Clyne 63' c Walker 67' m Con: M. Smith (1/2) 64'; Pen: M. Smith (1/2) 39'

Sandy Park
Attendance: 12,921
Referee: Craig Maxwell-Keys

27 April 2019
15:00

(1 BP) Leicester Tigers	20 – 23	Bristol Bears
Try: Olowofela 29' m Pen: G. Ford (5/5) 4', 21', 47', 55', 69'	Report	Try: Sheedy 35' m D. Thomas 57' m Thacker 74' c Con: Madigan (1/1) 75'; Pen: Sheedy (2/3) 10', 25'

Welford Road
Attendance: 20,119
Referee: Karl Dickson

27 April 2019
16:30

Wasps	14 – 31	Saracens
Try: Sopoaga 23' c Hughes 68' c Con: Sopoaga (2/2) 24', 68'	Report	Try: Spencer 4' c L. Williams 20' m Skelton 32' c Con: Farrell (2/3) 6', 33'; Pen: Farrell (4/4) 14', 28', 40', 59'

Ricoh Arena
Attendance: 15,502
Referee: Wayne Barnes

28 April 2019
15:00

Worcester Warriors	27 – 20	Gloucester (1 BP)
Try: Weir 17' c Annett 49' c Barry 55' c Con: Weir (3/3) 18', 50', 57'; Pen: Weir (2/2) 5', 15'	Report	Try: Purdy (2) 10' m, 61' m Heinz 38' c Con: Twelvetrees (1/3) 38'; Pen: Twelvetrees (1/1) 22'

Sixways
Attendance: 9,878
Referee: JP Doyle

==== Round 21 ====
3 May 2019
19:45

Bristol Bears	20 – 20	Sale Sharks
Try: C.Piutau 29'c Leiua 46'; Con: Sheedy (2/2) 30', 47'; Pen: Sheedy (2/2) 38', 70'	Report	Try: Solomona 9'c de Klerk 41'c Con: MacGinty (2/2) 10', 42'; Pen: MacGinty (1/1) 15' de Klerk (1/2) 35'

Ashton Gate
Attendance: 20,328
Referee: Matthew Carley

3 May 2019
19:45

Harlequins	23 – 19	Leicester Tigers
Try: Care 6' c Kunatani 73' c Con: Smith (1/1) 7'; Lang (1/1) 74'; Pen: Smith (3/4) 23', 49', 55'	Report	Try: Fitzgerald 80+2' c Con: G.Ford 80+4'; Pen: G.Ford (4/4) 2', 12', 28', 40'

Twickenham Stoop
Attendance: 14,301
Referee: Wayne Barnes

4 May 2019
15:00

(1 BP) Gloucester	28 – 19	Newcastle Falcons
Try: Woodward 22' c Cipriani 28' c Sharples 33' c Banahan 61' c Con: Twelvetrees (4/4) 23', 29', 34', 62'	Report	Try: M. Young 9' c Sinoti 25' m Blamire 56' c Con: Flood (2/2) 9', 57'

Kingsholm
Attendance: 14,442
Referee: Thomas Foley

- Newcastle Falcons are relegated.

4 May 2019
15:00

(1 BP) Northampton Saints	38 – 10	Worcester Warriors
Try: Burrell 3' c Naiyaravoro (2) 18' c, 26' c Wood 30' c R. Marshall 58' c Con: Biggar (5/5) 4', 19', 26', 31', 60'; Pen: Biggar (1/1) 51'	Report	Try: Te'o 38' c Con: Weir (1/1) 39'; Pen: Weir (1/2) 23'

Franklin's Gardens
Attendance: 14,035
Referee: Christophe Ridley

4 May 2019
15:00

(1 BP) Saracens	38 – 7	Exeter Chiefs
Try: Lewington (2) 32' c, 41' c Tompkins 44' c Morris (2) 66' c, 74' c Con: Malins (1/1) 33'; Bosch (2/2) 43', 45'; Whiteley (2/2) 67', 75'; Pen: Whiteley (1/1) 62'	Report	Try: Capstick 55' c Con: Steenson (1/1) 55'

Allianz Park
Attendance: 10,000
Referee: Ian Tempest

5 May 2019
15:00

(1 BP) Bath	29 – 17	Wasps
Try: Joseph 3' c Mercer (2) 73' c, 80+1' c Cokanasiga 77' m Con: Burns (1/1) 4'; A. Davies (1/2) 73'; Fotuali'i (1/1) 80+3'; Pen: Burns (1/2) 36'	Report	Try: Carr 13' c Hughes 28' c Con: Miller (2/2) 14', 29'; Pen: Miller (1/1) 40+1'

Recreation Ground
Attendance: 14,329
Referee: Luke Pearce

==== Round 22 ====
18 May 2019
16:00

(1 BP) Exeter Chiefs	40 – 21	Northampton Saints
Try: Slade 9' c Moon 31' c Armand 36' c Kvesic 47' m Dennis 56' c Cowan-Dickie 72' c Con: J. Simmonds (5/6) 10', 32', 37', 57', 73'	Report	Try: Francis 1' c Hutchinson 24' c Reinach 40+5' c Con: Biggar (2/2) 2', 25'; Grayson (1/1) 40+6'

Sandy Park
Attendance: 12,911
Referee: Karl Dickson

18 May 2019
16:00

(1 BP) Leicester Tigers	31 – 32	Bath (1 BP)
Try: B. O'Connor (2) 8' c, 23' c Blommetjies 49' m Con: G. Ford (2/3) 9', 23'; Pen: G. Ford (4/5) 5', 16', 29', 38'	Report	Try: A. Watson 2' c Cokanasiga 11' m Obano 45' c van Rooyen 77' c Con: Burns (2/3) 3', 46'; Priestland (1/1) 79'; Pen: Priestland (2/2) 40', 65'

Welford Road
Attendance: 20,886
Referee: Craig Maxwell-Keys

18 May 2019
16:00

(1 BP) Newcastle Falcons	12 – 19	Bristol Bears
Try: Graham 75' c J. Williams 79' m Con: Hodgson (1/1) 76'	Report	Try: C. Piutau 9' m O'Conor 46' c Lam 51' c Con: Sheedy (2/3) 47', 51'

Kingston Park
Attendance: 6,442
Referee: JP Doyle

18 May 2019
16:00

(1 BP) Sale Sharks	46 – 41	Gloucester (2 BP)
Try: T. Curry 1' c Webber 15' m S. James 18' c Ashton 33' m McGuigan 42' c MacGinty 65' c Solomona 67' m Con: MacGinty (4/6) 2', 19', 43, 66'; Pen: MacGinty (1/1) 80'	Report	Try: Seabrook 7' c Vellacott (2) 23' c, 55' c Banahan 27' c Ludlow 40' m Coetzer 48' m Con: L. Evans (4/6) 8', 24', 28', 56'; Pen: L. Evans (1/1) 64'

AJ Bell Stadium
Attendance: 7,848
Referee: Wayne Barnes

18 May 2019
16:00

Wasps	27 – 25	Harlequins (1 BP)
Try: Bassett 11' c Simpson (2) 50' c, 54' c Con: Sopoaga (3/3) 13', 51', 55'; Pen: Sopoaga (2/2) 29', 71'	Report	Try: Marchant 17' m Care 59' c Elia 75' c Con: Lang (2/2) 60', 76'; Pen: M. Smith (1/2) 7'; Lang (1/2) 63'

Ricoh Arena
Attendance: 16,182
Referee: Matthew Carley

18 May 2019
16:00

(1 BP) Worcester Warriors	31 – 29	Saracens (1 BP)
Try: Fatialofa 9' c Pennell 34' c T. Hill 54' c Adams 75' c Con: Weir (4/4) 10', 35', 55', 76'; Pen: Weir (1/1) 80+2'	Report	Try: Tompkins 31' c Bosch 59' c Con: Whiteley (2/2) 33', 60'; Pen: Whiteley (5/5) 6', 22', 37', 49', 68'

Sixways
Attendance: 9,125
Referee: Adam Leal

== Play-offs ==
As in previous seasons, the top four teams in the Premiership table, following the conclusion of the regular season, contest the play-off semi-finals in a 1st vs 4th and 2nd vs 3rd format, with the higher ranking team having home advantage. The two winners of the semi-finals then meet in the Premiership Final at Twickenham on 1 June 2019.

=== Bracket ===
Semi-finals
25 May 2019 – Allianz Park
Saracens	44
Gloucester	19
25 May 2019 – Sandy Park
Exeter Chiefs	42
Northampton Saints	12

Final
1 June 2019 – Twickenham
Exeter Chiefs	34
Saracens	37

=== Semi-finals ===
25 May 2019
13:30

Saracens (2)	44 – 19	(3) Gloucester
Try: Maitland 5' m Spencer 29' c L. Williams 37' m Tompkins (3) 42' c, 50' c, 56' c Con: Farrell (4/6) 30', 43', 51', 57'; Pen: Farrell (2/5) 17', 36'	Report	Try: Morgan 3' c Dreyer 59' c Ludlow 68' m Con: Twelvetrees (2/3) 4', 60'

Allianz Park, London
Attendance: 9,568
Referee: Luke Pearce

Team details

FB	15	(England) Alex Goode
RW	14	(Wales) Liam Williams	(substituted off) 63'
OC	13	(England) Alex Lozowski
IC	12	(England) Brad Barritt (c)	(substituted off) 27'
LW	11	(Scotland) Sean Maitland
FH	10	(England) Owen Farrell
SH	9	(England) Ben Spencer	(substituted off) 51'
N8	8	(England) Billy Vunipola	(substituted off) 59'
OF	7	(England) Jackson Wray
BF	6	(England) Maro Itoje
RL	5	(England) George Kruis
LL	4	(Australia) Will Skelton	(substituted off) 53'
TP	3	(South Africa) Vincent Koch	(substituted off) 57'
HK	2	(England) Jamie George	(substituted off) 64'
LP	1	(England) Richard Barrington	(substituted off) 57'
Substitutions:
HK	16	(England) Joe Gray	(substituted on) 64'
PR	17	(England) Ralph Adams-Hale	(substituted on) 57'
PR	18	(England) Christian Judge	(substituted on) 57'
LK	19	(England) Nick Isiekwe	(substituted on) 53'
FL	20	(South Africa) Michael Rhodes	(substituted on) 59'
SH	21	(England) Richard Wigglesworth	(substituted on) 51'
CE	22	(Wales) Nick Tompkins	(substituted on) 27'
WG	23	(England) David Strettle	(substituted on) 63'
Coach:
(Ireland) Mark McCall

FB	15	(New Zealand) Jason Woodward	(substituted off) 73'
RW	14	(England) Charlie Sharples	(substituted off) 53'
OC	13	(England) Billy Twelvetrees
IC	12	(England) Mark Atkinson
LW	11	(New Zealand) Tom Marshall
FH	10	(England) Danny Cipriani
SH	9	(New Zealand) Willi Heinz
N8	8	(England) Ben Morgan
OF	7	(South Africa) Jaco Kriel	(substituted off) 65'
BF	6	(South Africa) Ruan Ackermann
RL	5	(South Africa) Franco Mostert	(substituted off) 57'
LL	4	(England) Ed Slater (c)	(substituted off) 26'
TP	3	(England) Fraser Balmain	(substituted off) 57'
HK	2	(South Africa) Franco Marais	(substituted off) 57'
LP	1	(New Zealand) Josh Hohneck	(substituted off) 57'
Substitutions:
HK	16	(Ireland) Mike Sherry	(substituted on) 57'
PR	17	(England) Val Rapava-Ruskin	(substituted on) 57'
PR	18	(South Africa) Ruan Dreyer	(substituted on) 57'
LK	19	(England) Tom Savage	(substituted on) 26'
FL	20	(England) Lewis Ludlow	(substituted on) 57'
N8	21	(Italy) Jake Polledri	(substituted on) 65'
SH	22	(Scotland) Ben Vellacott	(substituted on) 73'
WG	23	(England) Henry Purdy	(substituted on) 53'
Coach:
(South Africa) Johan Ackermann

25 May 2019
16:30

Exeter Chiefs (1)	42 – 12	(4) Northampton Saints
Try: H. Williams 16' c J. Simmonds 21' c Dennis 45' c O'Flaherty 48' c S. Simmonds 70' c S. Hill 80+1' c Con: J. Simmonds (6/6) 17', 23', 47', 49', 70', 80+2'	Report	Try: Penalty try 28'; Tuala 30' m

Sandy Park, Exeter
Attendance: 12,577
Referee: Matthew Carley

Team details

FB	15	(England) Jack Nowell
RW	14	(Wales) Alex Cuthbert
OC	13	(England) Henry Slade		(substituted off) 59'
IC	12	(England) Ollie Devoto
LW	11	(England) Tom O'Flaherty	(yellow card) 28'	(substituted off) 72'
FH	10	(England) Joe Simmonds
SH	9	(Australia) Nic White		(substituted off) 70'
N8	8	(England) Matt Kvesic
OF	7	(England) Don Armand
BF	6	(England) Dave Ewers		(substituted off) 61'
RL	5	(England) Jonny Hill
LL	4	(Australia) Dave Dennis		(substituted off) 54'
TP	3	(England) Harry Williams		(substituted off) 49'
HK	2	(England) Jack Yeandle (c)		(substituted off) 51'
LP	1	(England) Ben Moon		(substituted off) 51'
Replacements:
HK	16	(England) Luke Cowan-Dickie		(substituted on) 51'
PR	17	(England) Alec Hepburn		(substituted on) 51'
PR	18	(Wales) Tomas Francis		(substituted on) 49'
LK	19	(Scotland) Sam Skinner		(substituted on) 54'
FL	20	(England) Sam Simmonds		(substituted on) 61'
SH	21	(England) Jack Maunder		(substituted on) 70'
FH	22	(Ireland) Gareth Steenson		(substituted on) 72'
CE	23	(England) Sam Hill		(substituted on) 59'
Coach:
(England) Rob Baxter

FB	15	(Samoa) Ahsee Tuala
RW	14	(England) Tom Collins
OC	13	(Scotland) Rory Hutchinson
IC	12	(England) Piers Francis
LW	11	(Australia) Taqele Naiyaravoro	(substituted off) 61'
FH	10	(Wales) Dan Biggar
SH	9	(South Africa) Cobus Reinach	(substituted off) 56'
N8	8	(England) Teimana Harrison
OF	7	(England) Lewis Ludlam	(substituted off) 58'
BF	6	(England) Courtney Lawes (c)
RL	5	(Fiji) Api Ratuniyarawa	(substituted off) 51'
LL	4	(England) Alex Moon	(substituted off) 51'
TP	3	(England) Ehren Painter	(substituted off) 54'
HK	2	(England) James Fish	(substituted off) 58'
LP	1	(South Africa) Francois van Wyk	(substituted off) 54'
Substitutions:
HK	16	(England) Darren Dawidiuk	(substituted on) 58'
PR	17	(England) Alex Waller	(substituted on) 54'
PR	18	(England) Paul Hill	(substituted on) 54'
LK	19	(South Africa) David Ribbans	(substituted on) 51'
FL	20	(England) Jamie Gibson	(substituted on) 51'
FL	21	(England) Tom Wood	(substituted on) 58'
SH	22	(England) Alex Mitchell	(substituted on) 56'
CE	23	(England) Luther Burrell	(substituted on) 61'
Coach:
(New Zealand) Chris Boyd

=== Final ===
1 June 2019
15:00

Exeter Chiefs (1)	34 – 37	(2) Saracens
Try: White 1' c Ewers 21' c J. Hill 31' m Slade 58' m S. Hill 80+1' c Con: J. Simmonds (3/5) 2', 22', 80+2'; Pen: J. Simmonds (1/1) 40+1'	Report	Try: George (2) 4' m, 77' c Spencer 14' m L. Williams 60' c Maitland 68' c Con: Farrell (3/5) 62', 69', 78'; Pen: Farrell (2/3) 10', 36'

Twickenham Stadium, London
Attendance: 75,329
Referee: Wayne Barnes

Exeter Chiefs
Saracens

Team details

FB	15	(England) Jack Nowell		(substituted off) 70'
RW	14	(Wales) Alex Cuthbert		(substituted off) 62'
OC	13	(England) Henry Slade	(yellow card) 4'
IC	12	(England) Ollie Devoto
LW	11	(England) Tom O'Flaherty
FH	10	(England) Joe Simmonds
SH	9	(Australia) Nic White		(substituted off) 66'
N8	8	(England) Matt Kvesic
OF	7	(England) Don Armand		26' to 36'
BF	6	(England) Dave Ewers
RL	5	(England) Jonny Hill				(substituted off) 50'
LL	4	(Australia) Dave Dennis		(substituted off) 69'
TP	3	(England) Harry Williams		(substituted off) 47'
HK	2	(England) Jack Yeandle (c)		(substituted off) 47'
LP	1	(England) Ben Moon		(substituted off) 47'
Replacements:
HK	16	(England) Luke Cowan-Dickie		(substituted on) 47'
PR	17	(England) Alec Hepburn		(substituted on) 47'
PR	18	(Wales) Tomas Francis		(substituted on) 47'
LK	19	(Scotland) Sam Skinner		(substituted on) 26'	(substituted off) 36'	(substituted on) 50'
FL	20	(England) Sam Simmonds		(substituted on) 69'
SH	21	(England) Jack Maunder		(substituted on) 66'
FH	22	(Ireland) Gareth Steenson		(substituted on) 70'
CE	23	(England) Sam Hill		(substituted on) 62'
Coach:
(England) Rob Baxter

FB	15	(England) Alex Goode
RW	14	(Wales) Liam Williams		(substituted off) 78'
OC	13	(England) Alex Lozowski
IC	12	(England) Brad Barritt (c)		(substituted off) 41'
LW	11	(Scotland) Sean Maitland
FH	10	(England) Owen Farrell
SH	9	(England) Ben Spencer		(substituted off) 42'
N8	8	(England) Billy Vunipola
OF	7	(England) Jackson Wray		(substituted off) 56'
BF	6	(England) Maro Itoje	(yellow card) 20'
RL	5	(England) George Kruis
LL	4	(Australia) Will Skelton		(substituted off) 49'	(substituted on) 59'	(substituted off) 70'
TP	3	(South Africa) Vincent Koch		(substituted off) 72'
HK	2	(England) Jamie George
LP	1	(England) Richard Barrington		(substituted off) 66'
Substitutions:
HK	16	(England) Tom Woolstencroft				(substituted on) 70'
PR	17	(England) Ralph Adams-Hale		(substituted on) 66'
PR	18	(England) Christian Judge		(substituted on) 72'
LK	19	(England) Nick Isiekwe		(substituted on) 56'
FL	20	(South Africa) Michael Rhodes		(substituted on) 49'	(substituted off) 59'
SH	21	(England) Richard Wigglesworth		(substituted on) 42'
CE	22	(Wales) Nick Tompkins		(substituted on) 41'
WG	23	(England) David Strettle		(substituted on) 78'
Coach:
(Ireland) Mark McCall

Man of the Match:
(England) Maro Itoje (Saracens)
Assistant referees:
Matthew Carley
Tom Foley
Television Match Official:
Graham Hughes

== Leading scorers ==
Note: Flags indicate national union as has been defined under WR eligibility rules. Players may hold more than one non-WR nationality.

=== Most points ===
As of 1 June 2019

Rank	Player	Club	Points
1	(England) George Ford	Leicester	221
2	(Scotland) Duncan Weir	Worcester	204
3	(England) Marcus Smith	Harlequins	170
4	(Wales) Dan Biggar	Northampton	168
5	(England) Billy Twelvetrees	Gloucester	165
6	(England) Owen Farrell	Saracens	143
7	(England) Callum Sheedy	Bristol	130
8	(England) Freddie Burns	Bath	118
9	(New Zealand) Lima Sopoaga	Wasps	116
10	(United States) AJ MacGinty	Sale	114
10	(Wales) Rhys Priestland	Bath	114

=== Most tries ===
As of 1 June 2019

Rank	Player	Club	Tries
1	(South Africa) Cobus Reinach	Northampton	12
1	(England) Denny Solomona	Sale	12
3	(England) Joe Marchant	Harlequins	11
3	(England) Jonny May	Leicester	11
3	(England) Nick Tompkins	Saracens	11
6	(England) Charlie Sharples	Gloucester	10
7	(Argentina) Santiago Cordero	Exeter	9
7	(England) Nathan Earle	Harlequins	9
7	(England) Alex Lewington	Saracens	9
7	(Wales) Liam Williams	Saracens	9

== Awards ==
=== Player of the Month ===
The following received Player of the Month awards during the 2018–19 season, as selected by a panel of media commentators, in addition to monthly public polls.

Month	Nationality	Player	Position	Club
September	England	Danny Cipriani	Fly-Half	Gloucester
October	England	Alex Goode	Full-Back	Saracens
November	England	Ollie Thorley	Wing	Gloucester
December	South Africa	Cobus Reinach	Scrum-Half	Northampton
February	Scotland	Rory Hutchinson	Centre	Northampton
March	Argentina	Santiago Cordero	Wing	Exeter
April	South Africa	Francois Hougaard	Scrum-Half	Worcester

=== End-of-season awards ===
The winners of the 2019 Premiership Rugby Awards were announced on 22 May 2019.

Player of the Season
Nationality	Nominee	Club	Winner
England	Danny Cipriani	Gloucester	(England); Danny Cipriani
South Africa	Faf de Klerk	Sale	(England); Danny Cipriani
England	Alex Goode	Saracens	(England); Danny Cipriani
England	Matt Kvesic	Exeter	(England); Danny Cipriani
New Zealand	Steve Luatua	Bristol	(England); Danny Cipriani
South Africa	Cobus Reinach	Northampton	(England); Danny Cipriani

Young Player of the Season
Nationality	Nominee	Club	Winner
England	Joe Cokanasiga	Bath	(England); Tom Curry
England	Tom Curry	Sale	(England); Tom Curry
England	Alex Dombrandt	Harlequins	(England); Tom Curry
Scotland	Rory Hutchinson	Northampton	(England); Tom Curry
England	Joe Simmonds	Exeter	(England); Tom Curry
England	Ollie Thorley	Gloucester	(England); Tom Curry

Director of Rugby of the Season
Nationality	Nominee	Club	Winner
South Africa	Johan Ackermann	Gloucester	(Ireland); Mark McCall
England	Rob Baxter	Exeter	(Ireland); Mark McCall
New Zealand	Chris Boyd	Northampton	(Ireland); Mark McCall
Samoa	Pat Lam	Bristol	(Ireland); Mark McCall
Ireland	Mark McCall	Saracens	(Ireland); Mark McCall

Community Player of the Season
Nationality	Nominee	Club	Winner
England	Darren Barry	Worcester	(South Africa); Nick Fenton-Wells
England	Calum Clark	Saracens	(South Africa); Nick Fenton-Wells
South Africa	Nick Fenton-Wells	Bristol	(South Africa); Nick Fenton-Wells
England	Rob Miller	Wasps	(South Africa); Nick Fenton-Wells
Argentina	Lucas Noguera	Bath	(South Africa); Nick Fenton-Wells
England	Denny Solomona	Sale	(South Africa); Nick Fenton-Wells

Forwards
No.	Nationality	Player	Position	Club
1	England	Mako Vunipola	Prop	Saracens
2	England	Jamie George	Hooker	Saracens
3	New Zealand	John Afoa	Prop	Bristol
4	South Africa	Franco Mostert	Lock	Gloucester
5	Australia	Will Skelton	Lock	Saracens
6	England	Alex Dombrandt	Flanker	Harlequins
7	England	Tom Curry	Flanker	Sale
8	England	Matt Kvesic	Number 8	Exeter

Backs
No.	Nationality	Player	Position	Club
9	South Africa	Cobus Reinach	Scrum-Half	Northampton
10	England	Danny Cipriani	Fly-Half	Gloucester
11	England	Ollie Thorley	Wing	Gloucester
12	England	Mark Atkinson	Centre	Gloucester
13	England	Henry Slade	Centre	Exeter
14	Argentina	Santiago Cordero	Wing	Exeter
15	England	Alex Goode	Full-Back	Saracens
