= Joe Ford (rugby union) =

English rugby union player

- Born: Joseph Ford; 4 June 1990 (age 36) Oldham, England
- Height: 1.83 m (6 ft 0 in)
- Weight: 85 kg (13 st 5 lb; 187 lb)
- School: Rishworth School
- Notable relative(s): Mike Ford (father); George Ford (brother)

Rugby union career
- Position: Fly-half
Senior career
Years	Team	Apps	(Points)
2009–2010	Leeds Carnegie	13	(80)
2010–2011	Northampton Saints	5	(10)
2011–2013	Leeds Carnegie	45	(330)
2013–2016	Sale Sharks	48	(166)
2016–2017	Yorkshire Carnegie	22	(223)
2017–2019	Leicester Tigers	23	(116)
2019–2020	Yorkshire Carnegie	9	(22)
2009–2020	Total	156	(925)
- Correct as of 2 August 2019
Coaching career
- Years: Team
- 2020-2025: Doncaster Knights
- 2025-: Sale Sharks

Joe Ford (born 4 June 1990) is a rugby union attack coach for Sale Sharks. He was previously head coach of the Doncaster Knights. He has previously also been a player for Yorkshire Carnegie, in three other spells, as well as Northampton Saints, Sale Sharks and Leicester Tigers in Premiership Rugby.

== Career ==
Ford was a member of the Bradford Bulls Academy and played amateur rugby league for the St Albans Centurions.

Ford made his professional rugby debut for Leeds Carnegie on 8 November 2009 in the Anglo-Welsh Cup against Leicester Tigers, Ford scored 13 points in 28–17 win. His brother George Ford made his debut for Leicester in the same game.

Ford moved to Northampton Saints in 2010 but returned to Leeds at the end of the season having only featured in five games for the Saints.

After two years in the Championship, including being the third highest points scorer in the 2012-13 season, Ford moved back to the Premiership with Sale Sharks. After three years with the Sharks Ford returned for a third spell with Leeds, now called Yorkshire Carnegie.

In 2017, it was rumoured that Leicester Tigers were interested in signing him as back-up to his brother George. And on 1 June 2017 it was confirmed that Ford would join his brother at Leicester. Ford made his first start on 4 November 2017 against Gloucester in the Anglo-Welsh Cup, and was named captain for the match. On 15 May 2019 he was announced as one of the players to leave Leicester following the end of the 2018-19 Premiership Rugby season.

On 2 August 2019 Ford was announced as re-joining Yorkshire Carnegie in the role of player-head coach. A role he left on 23 January 2020.

He later signed a two-year deal to join RFU Championship side Doncaster Knights as a coach from the 2020–21 season. This deal was then turned into a Head Coach role after the departure of Steve Boden in 2024. The 2024–25 will be the start of his first full season in charge.

== Family ==
Born the eldest of three boys , his brother is England international George Ford. Their youngest brother Jacob (b.1998), is also a professional rugby player. He is the son of former England defence coach Mike Ford.
