= Reece Marshall =

Rugby player (born 1994)

- Full name: Reece Marshall
- Born: 9 September 1994 (age 32) Luton, England
- Height: 1.80 m (5 ft 11 in)
- Weight: 105 kg (16 st 7 lb; 231 lb)

Rugby union career
- Position: Hooker
- Current team: Northampton Saints
Youth career
- 2000-2010: Dunstablians R.F.C.
Senior career
Years	Team	Apps	(Points)
2013-	Northampton Saints	58	(40)
2013–2014	→ Coventry	2	(0)
2014	→ Old Albanians	6	(0)
2014	→ Moseley	6	(10)
2016	→ Nottingham	1	(0)
- Correct as of 3 April 2018

Reece Marshall (born 9 September 1994) is an English rugby union player currently playing for Aviva Premiership side Northampton Saints.

Marshall began his rugby career at Moulton College, where the likes of his Northampton Saints teammates Howard Packman, Tom Collins and Tom Stephenson also graduated, and progressed to become a full-time Saint in the 2013/14 season.

After moving to the Saints, Marshall was signed on a dual-registration with Old Albanians where he played during his first season with the top-flight Midlands side along with getting some game time with the Saints' second team, the Wanderers, which he has represented as captain.

Marshall has since gone on loan to Coventry, Moseley and for Nottingham alongside his duties at Saints.

The young hooker made in Premiership debut for Saints in February 2016 as the Midlands side faced London Irish and has since made 31 appearances and scoring 3 tries in a Saint shirt.

Marshall has also played the game at International level, representing the England Under-16s and England Under-18s respectively.
