= Dallas Griffins =

Dallas Griffins may refer to:

- Dallas Griffins (1902), a minor league baseball team formerly located in Dallas, Texas, that played in the Texas League
- Griffins Rugby, a rugby union team from Dallas, Texas, that played in the Division 1 Red River Conference
