= Elaine Vassie =

- Born: 10 October 1981 (age 45) Paisley, Scotland
- Occupation: Director of Rugby / Coach / General Manager

Rugby union career
Coaching career
- Years: Team
- 2009–2012: Manchester Rugby Club
- 2012: DAK Mantova
- 2013–2015: Griffins Rugby
- 2016: Scotland Women 7's
- 2018-2020: Dallas Harlequins
- 2019-2022: Dallas Jackals
- 2024 - present: Colgate University

Elaine Vassie (born 10 October 1981 in Paisley, Scotland) is a professional rugby union coach. She is the assistant general manager and attack coach of Major League Rugby side Dallas Jackals.

Vassie caught the headlines in 2009, taking over then National League 1 side Manchester Rugby Club in a role that had been labelled "arguably the hardest job in rugby". Aged just 28, no other female had or has since held such a position at National League level. Following her 3-year spell at Manchester Rugby Club, Vassie linked up with Italian side, DAK Mantova combining a coaching and club development position. In October 2013, it was announced that she was to become Director of Rugby of American side Griffins Rugby, the first person in such a role in the club's history.

In 2016, Vassie was announced as coach of Scotland Women's 7's team ahead of their upcoming European Championships. The squad secured Bronze medal position in the European Trophy Competition

Returning to the U.S. in 2018, she was appointed as Division 1 side Dallas Harlequins' new director of rugby and Men's Head Coach.

Subsequently, in June 2020 Vassie was announced as attack coach and assistant general manager for the new Major League Rugby franchise Dallas Jackals, the first female AGM appointment in the league's history. Elaine was subsequently promoted to General Manager, the first female GM in MLR history.

A change in ownership saw Vassie, fellow Coach Aaron Jarvis, Analyst Darren Lewis, and President Scott Sonju depart in 2022.

Vassie was announced as Director of Rugby/Head Coach at Colgate University in summer 2024.
