= Christian Judge =

English rugby union player

Christian 'Le Cochon' Judge
- Born: Christian James Judge; January 8, 1993 (age 33) Wolverhampton
- Height: 5 ft 11 in (180 cm)
- Weight: 18 st 13 lb (265 lb; 120 kg)

Rugby union career
- Position: Tighthead Prop
- Current team: Beziers
Senior career
Years	Team	Apps	(Points)
2014–2015	Launceston	28	(5)
2015–2016	Plymouth Albion	30	(15)
2016–2017	Bedford Blues	19	(0)
2017–2019	Cornish Pirates	32	(0)
2018–2019	→ Saracens (loan)	20	(5)
2019–2021	Bath	43	(0)
2021–2022	Worcester Warriors	28	(0)
2022–2024	Saracens	35	(0)
2024–	Beziers	0	(0)
- Correct as of 8 December 2021
International career
Years	Team	Apps	(Points)
2015–2016	Cornwall		

Christian James Judge (born 8 January 1993) is an English professional rugby union player who plays as a tighthead prop for Pro D2 club Beziers.

Judge began playing rugby age 8 for his local club Launceston, representing the side all the way through to their first team. He then joined Plymouth Albion and impressed in National League 1. Judge played for Derwent College rugby team in his time at the University of York (2011–14). Judge played for Cornwall as they won the County Championship in 2015 and 2016.

He joined Bedford Blues in the RFU Championship in 2016 and in the summer of 2017 moved back to Cornwall by joining the Cornish Pirates.

On 17 September 2018 Judge joined Premiership Rugby side Saracens initially on a three-week loan. The loan was extended until January, and then again until the end of the 2018-19 Premiership Rugby season. Judge ended the season as Premiership champion coming off the bench as Saracens won the 2019 Premiership Final against Exeter Chiefs.

On 18 January 2019 it was announced that Judge would be joining Bath for the 2019–20 Premiership Rugby season.

He joined Worcester Warriors for the 2020–21 season. On 27 May 2022, Judge would return to Saracens ahead of the 2022–23 season.

He helped Saracens win the Premiership title in 2023, featuring as a replacement in the final as Saracens defeated Sale Sharks.

On 12 March 2024, Judge makes his move to France as he signs for Beziers in the Pro D2 competition from the 2024–25 season.
