= Tom Lawday =

- Born: Tom Lawday; 11 November 1993 (age 33) Dorchester, England
- Height: 1.88 m (6 ft 2 in)
- Weight: 109 kg (240 lb; 17 st 2 lb)

Rugby union career
- Position(s): Flanker, Number 8
Amateur team(s)
| Years | Team | Apps | (Points) |
| 2016-2017 | Exeter University RFC | 11 | (60) |
Senior career
| Years | Team | Apps | (Points) |
| 2016-2019 | Exeter Chiefs | 21 | (30) |
| 2017-2018 | → Cornish Pirates | 23 | (35) |
| 2019- | Harlequins | 88 | (35) |
International career
| Years | Team | Apps | (Points) |
| 2016 | England Students | | |

Tom Lawday (born 11 November 1993) is an English rugby union player for Harlequins. He plays as a backrow. He was formerly at Exeter Chiefs and Cornish Pirates as well as winning the BUCS player of the season in 2016/17.

== BUCS career ==
Lawday was part of the Exeter University squad for the 2016/17 BUCS season where he was the leagues top try scorer, with 13 in 11 games. He won man of the match in 6 games. At the end of the season he was awarded the player of the season award.

== Club career ==
In 2016 Lawday made his debut for Exeter Chiefs in the Anglo-Welsh Cup against Harlequins. While at Exeter he spent some time on loan at RFU Championship side Cornish Pirates. In 2019 he signed for Harlequins where he went on to make his debut against his former club. He came off the bench against Exeter in the 2020/21 Premiership Final.

== Honours ==
=== Team ===
2016/17 BUCS Runners Up (Exeter University)

2017/18 Anglo-Welsh Cup Champions (Exeter Chiefs)

2018/19 Premiership Runners Up (Exeter Chiefs)

2020/21 Premiership Champions (Harlequins)

=== Personal ===
2016/17 BUCS Player of the Season
