= Mike Ford (rugby) =

English rugby league footballer and coach (born 1965)

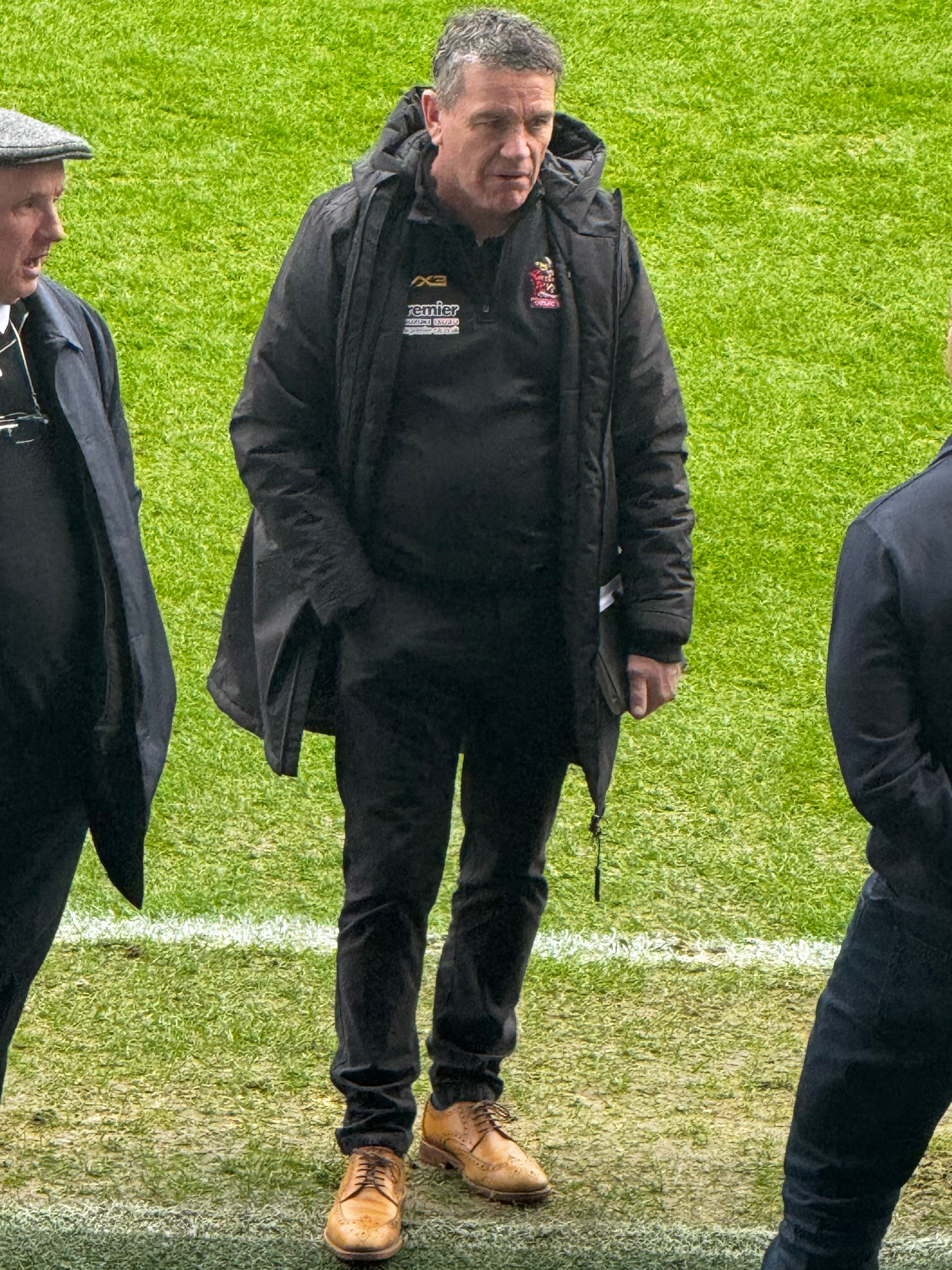

Personal information
- Full name: Michael A. Ford
- Born: 18 November 1965 (age 60) Oldham, Lancashire, England

Playing information
- Position: Scrum-half
Club
Years	Team	Pld	T	G	FG	P
1982–86	Wigan	85	24	0	3	99
1985	Eastern Suburbs	1	0	0	0	0
1986–87	Leigh	27	9	0	1	37
1987–91	Oldham	115	30	1	8	130
1991–94	Castleford	116	51	0	2	206
1995	South Queensland Crushers	15	3	0	0	12
1995–96	Warrington	18	4	1	1	19
1996–97	Wakefield Trinity	24	6	0	0	24
1997–98	Castleford Tigers	47	6	0	6	30
1999	Bramley	29	3	0	3	14
2000–01	Oldham RLFC	42	7	0	5	33
	Total	519	143	2	29	604
Representative
Years	Team	Pld	T	G	FG	P
1992	England	1	0	0	0	0
1993	Great Britain	2	2	0	0	8

Coaching information

Rugby league
Club
Years	Team	Gms	W	D	L	W%
1999	Bramley
2000–01	Oldham
2023	Oldham	6	3	0	3	50
2026	Oldham	3	2	0	1	67
	Total	9	5	0	4	56

Rugby union
Club
Years	Team	Gms	W	D	L	W%
2004–05	Saracens (defence)
2005–06	Saracens
2011–12	Leeds Carnegie (consultant)
2012	Newcastle Falcons (defence consultant)
2012–13	Bath (backs)
2013–16	Bath
2016–17	Toulon
2017–18	Dallas Griffins
2019–21	Leicester Tigers (assistant)
	Total	0	0	0	0
Representative
Years	Team	Gms	W	D	L	W%
2002–05	Ireland (defence)
2005	British & Irish Lions (defence)
2006–11	England (defence)
2018–19	Germany
2023–	Belgium	5	1	0	4	20
- Source: As of 5 February 2026

Mike A. Ford (born 18 November 1965) is an English rugby league and rugby union coach, and former rugby league footballer. He was most recently the managing director of RFL Championship side Oldham.

== Background ==
Ford was born in Oldham, Lancashire, England. He was a pupil at Saddleworth School in Uppermill, Greater Manchester, from 1976 to 1981, where he was taught and coached by Phil Larder. Larder later recommended Ford to Ireland when Larder was defence coach of England.

Three of his sons play rugby union. George plays for Sale Sharks, and England. Joe is head coach of Doncaster Knights and his youngest son Jacob was the attack coach for Loughborough Students before being named as head coach for Westcliff Rugby Club In August 2019.

== Playing career ==
Ford played rugby league as a scrum-half, playing for Wigan, Leigh, Oldham (two spells), Sydney Roosters, Castleford (two spells), South Queensland Crushers, Warrington, Wakefield Trinity and Bramley. He won 10 caps for Great Britain.

Ford played scrum-half in Wigan's 14–8 victory over New Zealand in the tour match on Sunday 6 October 1985.

Ford played in Castleford's 12–28 defeat by Wigan in the 1992 Challenge Cup Final.

Ford is a Castleford Tigers Hall Of Fame inductee.

Ford moved to South Queensland Crushers but played just 15 games there.

Ford made his début for Warrington on Wednesday 1 November 1995, and he played his last match for Warrington on Monday 8 April 1996, he made his début for Wakefield Trinity during the 1996 season, and he played his last match for Wakefield Trinity during the 1997 season.

== Coaching career ==
=== Bramley (rugby league) ===
In 1999, Ford joined Bramley as a player-coach, and joined Oldham in a similar role a year later. He retired from playing in 2001 after guiding Oldham to the championship Grand Final. Whilst at Oldham, he started coaching rugby union at Dukinfield RUFC for 5 seasons, winning a cup and two promotions.

=== Ireland (rugby union) ===
Ford left Oldham to take over as Defensive Co-ordinator of Ireland in January 2002 and stayed for 4 seasons, winning a triple crown and helping guide Ireland to 3rd in the world rankings. In September 2004, he started working as a defence and skills coach at Saracens, before taking over as head coach in August 2005.

=== British & Irish Lions (rugby union) ===
He served as a defence coach for the British & Irish Lions midweek team on their 2005 tour to New Zealand, remaining undefeated in 7 games (the test side lost the series 3–0). He left his position with Ireland in September 2005.

=== England (rugby union) ===
In May 2006, Ford became defence coach of England, part of the coaching team that guided England to the 2007 World Cup Final. With Ford as defence coach England conceded the fewest points in the 2009 Six Nations (70) and the fewest tries in the 2010 Six Nations (5), and the fewest tries in the pool stages of the 2011 World Cup.

=== Bath (rugby union) ===
Deciding not to seek a renewal of his England contract, Ford joined the coaching staff at Bath Rugby. He became head coach at Bath in May 2013 and guided them to a Champions Cup spot and an Amlin Challenge Cup final. In 2014/15 Bath finished 2nd in the Premiership and lost in the Premiership Final to Saracens. Ford was awarded the Aviva Premiership Director of Rugby of the Year award in 2015 while his son George won Player of the Year. He left Bath in May 2016 after they had finished 9th in the league.

=== Toulon (rugby union) ===
Ford joined Toulon as head coach in October 2016 but left at the end of the 2016/17 season. He then announced his move to the Dallas Griffins. Shortly after he joined Leicester Tigers where he remained until the conclusion of the 2020–21 season.

=== Belgium (rugby union) ===
In 2022, he coached the Belgium national rugby union team.

=== Oldham (rugby league) ===
On 12 November 2025 he took on the role of head-coach for Oldham RLFC in the RFL Championship following the exit of Sean Long

After Oldham's defeat to London Broncos on 1 February 2026, Ford announced his immediate departure from the club stating "it has become clear that the direction of travel of the club is not something that I feel I can be a part of."

== Executive career ==
In 2023, Ford led a consortium that purchased his hometown team, Oldham R.L.F.C., and acted as interim head coach until the end of that season. From September 2025 to February 2026 he was the club's Managing Director.
