= George Ford (rugby union) =

English rugby union player (born 1993)

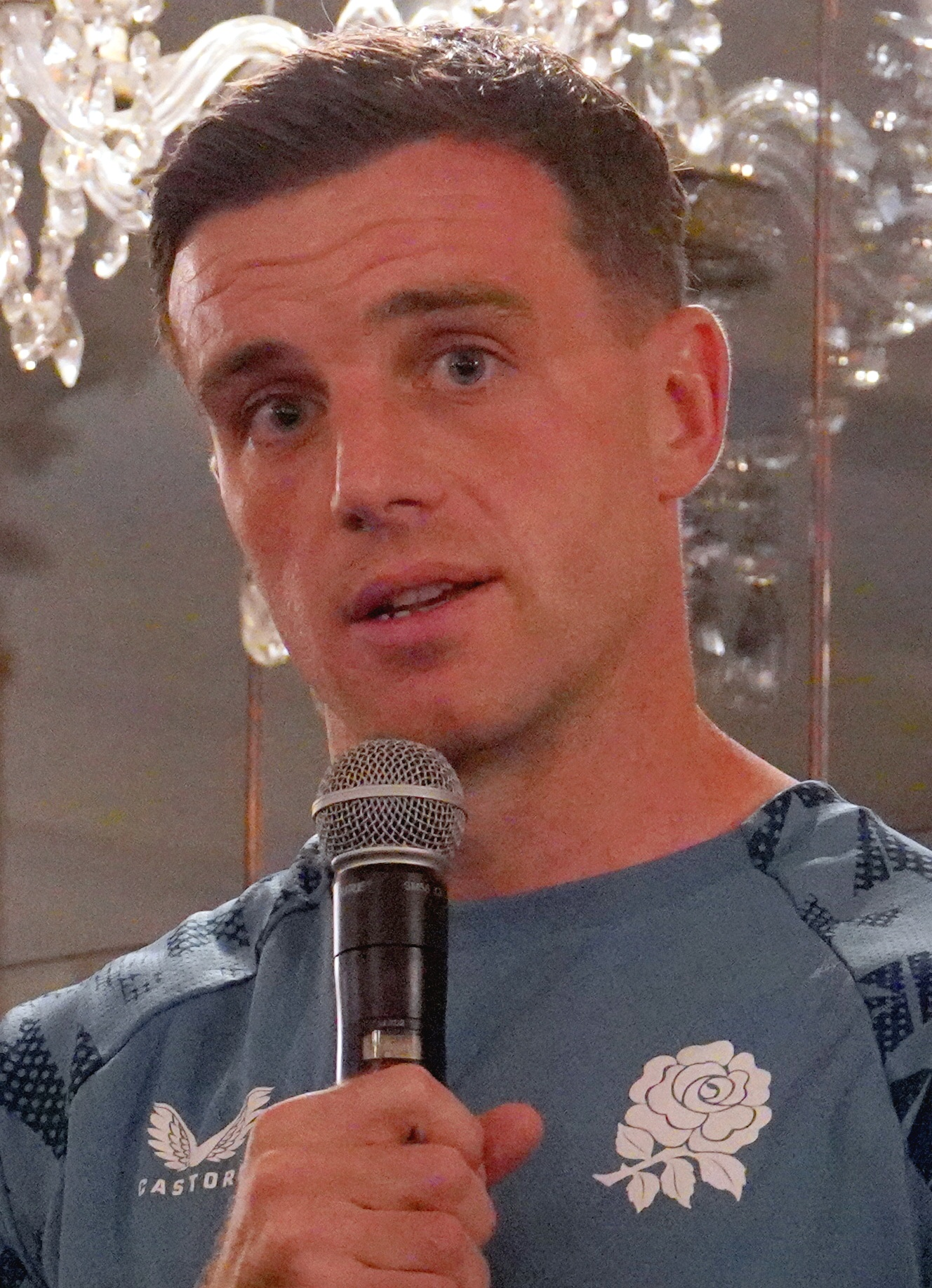
- Ford at an event at the UK embassy in the US in 2025
- Full name: George Thomas Ford
- Born: 16 March 1993 (age 33) Oldham, England
- Height: 1.78 m (5 ft 10 in)
- Weight: 84 kg (185 lb; 13 st 3 lb)
- School: Rishworth School; St. George's School
- Notable relative(s): Mike Ford (father); Joe Ford (brother)

Rugby union career
- Position: Fly-half
- Current team: Sale Sharks
Senior career
| Years | Team | Apps | (Points) |
| 2009–2013 | Leicester Tigers | 42 | (265) |
| 2013–2017 | Bath | 90 | (960) |
| 2017–2022 | Leicester Tigers | 88 | (981) |
| 2022– | Sale Sharks | 66 | (521) |
- Correct as of 13 November 2026
International career
| Years | Team | Apps | (Points) |
| 2008–2010 | England U18 | 14 | (30) |
| 2011–2012 | England U20 | 11 | (143) |
| 2013 | England A | 2 | (12) |
| 2014– | England | 114 | (501) |
- Correct as of 13 November 2026
Medal record
Men's Rugby union
Representing England
Rugby World Cup
| Silver medal – second place | 2019 Japan | Squad |
| Bronze medal – third place | 2023 France | Squad |

George Thomas Ford (born 16 March 1993) is an English professional rugby union player who plays as a fly-half for Premiership Rugby club Sale Sharks and the England national team.

Ford made his professional debut at Leicester Tigers in 2009 at the age of 16, making him the youngest player to make his professional debut in England. He was World Rugby Junior Player of the Year in 2011. He has played in five Premiership finals, winning titles in 2013 and 2022. Ford earned his first cap for England during the 2014 Six Nations Championship against Wales. He has played for England in three Rugby World Cup campaigns.

== Early life ==
Ford was born in Oldham, Greater Manchester, he is the son of rugby league player Mike Ford. George Ford played rugby league from age five at Saddleworth Rangers and as a young teenager played in the academies at both Wigan Warriors and Bradford Bulls. He started playing rugby union aged 11 at Rishworth School and played for Leeds Carnegie, before eventually joining Leicester at the age of 16 and subsequently signed professional forms with them.

He played for England Under 18s at 15 years old. He then went on to captain the team in 2009–10 before moving up to the Under-20s where he started every game in a Six Nations Grand Slam, contributing 76 points. Ford then helped England to final of the 2011 Junior World Championship.

In December 2009, Ford was nominated for the BBC Young Sports Personality of the Year. In October 2011, he became the first Englishman to win the title of World Rugby Junior Player of the Year, and also became the youngest-ever winner of the award.

== Club career ==
=== Leicester Tigers ===
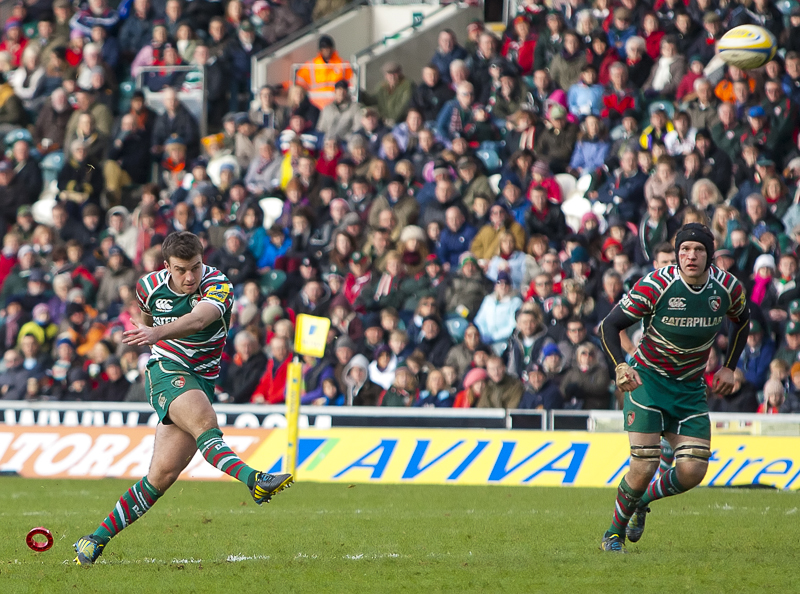
Ford playing for Leicester Tigers (2012)

On 8 November 2009, Ford became the youngest rugby union player to make his professional debut in England, breaking the record of international teammate Owen Farrell, at just 16 years and 237 days old when Leicester played Leeds Tykes in the Anglo-Welsh Cup. His debut was doubly notable as his brother Joe was also starting at fly-half for Leeds that day.

On 27 November 2010, Ford made his Premiership debut, coming off the bench in a 44–19 victory over Newcastle Falcons to become the third youngest player in Premiership history, he has since dropped to fifth youngest. In September 2011, Ford made his first Premiership start in a 30–28 defeat to Exeter Chiefs, becoming the youngest player to start a Premiership match at fly half. In January 2012, he was loaned out to Leeds Carnegie for a short period, but returned to make his Heineken Cup debut, scoring his first Leicester try in the defeat of Aironi.

On 18 March 2012, two days after his 19th birthday, Ford won his first trophy for Leicester. He started in the Anglo-Welsh Cup semi-finals and final, winning Man of the Match in Leicester's semi-final win over Bath and scoring 16 points in the final as Tigers triumphed over local rivals Northampton Saints.

On 12 May 2012, Ford put in another impressive performance in a semi-final. A late replacement for the injured Toby Flood, he guided Leicester Tigers to the Premiership final, with a 14-point haul in the 24–15 semi-final victory over Saracens. He retained the starting spot for the final, but his 13-point haul with the boot was not enough as Leicester lost out 30–23 to Harlequins.

In January 2013, it was announced that Ford would be leaving Leicester Tigers at the end of the season to join Bath Rugby, where his father Mike Ford was at the time assistant coach. Despite this, he continued to play a full part in Leicester Tigers' season, which culminated in the club's tenth Premiership title. Ford came off the bench in the first half of the Premiership final to replace the injured Toby Flood, and scored 12 points in Leicester's 37–17 win over Northampton Saints.

In all, Ford played 40 matches for Leicester Tigers, scoring 253 points and winning two trophies.

=== Bath ===
On 23 January 2013, it was announced that Ford was to leave Leicester Tigers at the end of the season, to join Bath Rugby.

On 22 May 2014, Ford started for the Bath side that lost to Northampton in the final of the European Challenge Cup at Cardiff Arms Park. The following season Ford scored 11 points in the 2015 Premiership final as Bath were defeated 16-28 by Saracens to finish runners up.

After his father Mike was sacked as head coach, Ford was linked with a move away from the club and in December 2016 Sale Sharks Director of Rugby Steve Diamond confirmed his interest in Ford.

=== Return to Leicester ===
On 14 February 2017, it was announced that Ford would return to former club Leicester Tigers as part of a swap deal with Freddie Burns, at the end of the 2016–2017 season.

Ford started in the 2021 European Challenge Cup final which they lost against Montpellier. He was named as the Premiership's player of the month for December 2021. On 2 January 2022, Ford started his 100th game for Leicester across his two spells, he scored nine points in a win against Newcastle Falcons.

In Leicester's 2021–2022 Premiership semi-final against Northampton Saints, Ford inspired the victory scoring a "full house" with a try, conversion, penalty and drop goal for 22 points in a 27-13 win. Ford started the 2022 Premiership Rugby final, but suffered an early injury and was substituted in the 23rd minute, as Tigers beat Saracens 15-12.

=== Sale Sharks ===
On 17 November 2021, Leicester announced that Ford would be leaving the club at the end of the 2021–22 season to join Premiership rivals Sale Sharks. Due to a ruptured Achilles suffered in his final game for Leicester, Ford was unable to feature for Sale until February 2023. He made his debut for Sale in the Premiership Rugby Cup against Bristol Bears.

Ford started the 2022–23 Premiership Rugby semi-final against his former club Leicester Tigers kicking 11 points in a 21–13 victory, which took Sale to their first Premiership Final since 2006. He scored eight points during the final which Sale lost against Saracens to finish league runners up.

== International career ==
=== England U18 ===
Ford started playing for England U18 when he was 15 years old. He later became captain of the team. Ford was a regular in the successful England U18 side from 2008 to 2010. He was first selected for the 2008 end-of-season tour to Argentina at the age of just 15, and was first choice fly-half for the 2009 and 2010 Six Nations and for the 2009 tour to South Africa. He missed the 2010 tour to South Africa due to club commitments and in his absence the team's three year, 25-game winning run came to an end with a 23–17 defeat to the hosts.

=== England U20 ===
At the start of the 2010–11 season, still aged just 17, Ford was called into the England U20 squad for the 2011 campaign. He made his debut at fly-half in the opening U20 Six Nations game against Wales, scoring six points in England's 26–20 victory. He went on to start every game in the tournament, winning Man of the Match awards in the victories over France, Scotland and Ireland as England won the Grand Slam.

Despite being the youngest player competing at the 2011 U20 Junior World Cup, Ford remained first-choice fly-half as England finished in second place following victories over Ireland, Scotland, South Africa and France. The 33–22 loss to New Zealand in the final was the first time that Ford had tasted defeat with an England team since March 2008, when he was playing for the U16s. Such was the standard of his performances, however, that he won the World Rugby Junior Player of the Year award, beating New Zealanders Sam Cane and Luke Whitelock who were also shortlisted.

In 2012, Ford was made captain of the U20 side, and led England to an impressive 59–3 victory over Scotland in their opening Six Nations match. However, due to club commitments, that was the only match he played in the 2012 Six Nations. Ford was also left out of the squad for the 2012 Junior Rugby World Cup in order to have a full pre-season programme with Leicester.

Despite still being eligible for the U20s in 2013, Ford was instead promoted into the England A side when the Elite Player Squad was named at the start of the 2012–13 season. In January 2013 he started in games against Scotland A and Ireland Wolfhounds.

=== England ===
On 9 March 2014, a week before his twenty-first birthday, Ford made his England debut as a replacement against Wales in the penultimate round of the 2014 Six Nations Championship as England claimed their first triple crown in over a decade. The following weekend saw him make a 10 minute appearance against Italy in which he made a good break to set up a try for Chris Robshaw as England finished runners up.

Ford was man-of-the-match in England's win over Wales in the opening match of the 2015 Six Nations. He scored his first International try in the penultimate round against Scotland. In the final game of the tournament, he scored 25 points including a try in England's thrilling 55–35 win over France as they finished runners up again.

Ford was named in Stuart Lancaster's 31-man squad for the 2015 Rugby World Cup. He was picked to start in the tournament opener against Fiji as England won 35–11, however, one week later, Ford was dropped in favour of childhood friend Owen Farrell. England were subsequently knocked out in the pool stage, becoming the second after Wales, as host nation to fail to qualify for the knock-out rounds of their own tournament. The 1991 tournament was jointly hosted between Wales, England, Scotland, Ireland and France.

Following the departure of Head Coach Stuart Lancaster, Ford was selected in new coach Eddie Jones' first squad for the 2016 Six Nations Championship. He scored a try against Italy and was the starting fly-half as England achieved their first grand slam since 2003. Later that year Ford was part of the side that won 3-0 on their summer tour of Australia and in the 2016 Autumn Internationals scored a try against South Africa as England defeated the Springboks for the first time in a decade.

Ford was also a member of the side that retained their title during the 2017 Six Nations Championship, missing out on a consecutive grand slam with defeat in the final game away to Ireland which also brought an end to a record equalling 18 successive Test victories. Ford missed out on the 2017 Lions tour and instead was a member of the side that won 2-0 on their tour of Argentina, scoring a try in the first match. On 18 October 2018, Ford played his 50th test for England against Japan. Ford also captained the team that day which was his first match as captain.

Ford was included in the squad for the 2019 Rugby World Cup. He scored tries in pool stage games against United States and Argentina. He was dropped to the bench for the quarter-final against Australia but returned to the starting lineup for the semi-final against New Zealand. Ford also started in the final which England lost against South Africa to finish runners up.

After the World Cup, Ford scored a try against Ireland in the 2020 Six Nations Championship which England went on to win. Later that year, Ford started for England as they defeated France in extra-time to win the Autumn Nations Cup.

Ford played for England during the 2022 Six Nations but was then absent through injury until his selection for the 2023 Rugby World Cup. In their opening game of the tournament Ford scored all of England's points, kicking all six penalties as well as three drop goals in their 27-10 victory over Argentina. In the knockout phase, he was an unused replacement in the quarter-final against Fiji and then came off the bench as a second-half substitute in their elimination against champions South Africa. Ford also featured in their last game of the tournament which England won to finish third and claim the bronze medal.

In October 2024, Ford was one of seventeen players in the senior England side to receive an RFU Elite player squad contract. They are the first set of players to sign this agreement.

Ford won his 100th cap for England in a 35-12 victory over Argentina. After a late withdrawal by Jamie George, who had been called into the British & Irish Lions squad, he captained England in the second test of the series, this time a 22–17 victory over Argentina.

== Personal life ==
Ford is the son of former England defence coach Mike Ford. His older brother Joe was also a professional rugby player.

Ford married Atdhetare Hoxha in a ceremony on 15 August 2022.

== Career statistics ==
=== List of international tries ===
as of 23 February 2020

| No. | Date | Venue | Opponent | Score | Result | Competition | Ref. |
|---|---|---|---|---|---|---|---|
| 1 | 14 March 2015 | Twickenham Stadium, London, England | Scotland | 15–13 | 25–13 | 2015 Six Nations Championship | |
| 2 | 21 March 2015 | Twickenham Stadium, London, England | France | 32–22 | 55–35 | 2015 Six Nations Championship | |
| 3 | 14 February 2016 | Stadio Olimpico, Rome, Italy | Italy | 8–6 | 40–9 | 2016 Six Nations Championship | |
| 4 | 12 November 2016 | Twickenham Stadium, London, England | South Africa | 28–9 | 37–21 | 2016 end-of-year rugby union internationals | |
| 5 | 10 June 2017 | Estadio San Juan del Bicentenario, San Juan, Argentina | Argentina | 31–17 | 38–34 | 2017 England rugby union tour of Argentina | |
| 6 | 4 February 2018 | Stadio Olimpico, Rome, Italy | Italy | 32–15 | 46–15 | 2018 Six Nations Championship | |
| 7 | 16 March 2019 | Twickenham Stadium, London, England | Scotland | 36–38 | 38–38 | 2019 Six Nations Championship | |
| 8 | 26 September 2019 | Kobe City Misaki Park Stadium, Kobe, Japan | United States | 5–0 | 45–7 | 2019 Rugby World Cup | |
| 9 | 5 October 2019 | Tokyo Stadium, Chōfu, Japan | Argentina | 20–3 | 39–10 | 2019 Rugby World Cup | |
| 10 | 23 February 2020 | Twickenham Stadium, London, England | Ireland | 5–0 | 24–12 | 2020 Six Nations Championship | |

== Honours ==
England

- 3× Six Nations Championship: 2016, 2017, 2020
- 1× Autumn Nations Cup: 2020
- 1× Rugby World Cup runner-up: 2019

Leicester Tigers

- 2× Premiership Rugby: 2012–13, 2021–22
- 1× Anglo-Welsh Cup: 2011–12
- 1× EPCR Challenge Cup runner-up: 2020–21
- 1× Premiership Rugby runner-up: 2011–12

Bath

- 1× Premiership Rugby runner-up: 2014–15
- 1× EPCR Challenge Cup runner-up: 2013–14

Individual

- 1× World Rugby Junior Player of the Year: 2011
