= Phil Camm =

American rugby administrator

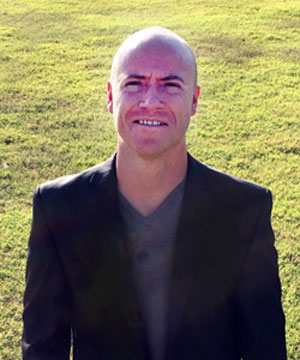
- Born: England

Phil Camm is the former co-owner and Managing Director of Griffins Rugby and helped spearhead the growth of professional rugby in America. Phil Camm created Griffins Rugby in 2008 along with Bill Bingham, Jeff Walton and Lee McCurrach. Bingham and Camm went on to grow Griffins into one of the country's first semi-pro rugby teams and were part of the initial group of team owners who took bold steps to professionalize the sport. This early group, with members from Austin, Seattle, Houston, Glendale (CO), Utah, Chicago, Kansas City and New Orleans became the foundation for Major League Rugby.

Dallas had originally planned to begin play in 2018 but a lack of suitable stadium forced them to wait until 2021, during which time, the team rebranded to become the Dallas Jackals. Camm began as General Manager but now runs a successful consultancy business specializing in sports and special events with ownership of the team now largely resting with Donnie Nelson and Neil Leibman (of the Texas Rangers) ownership group.

Since summer 2023, Camm has been supporting the launch of the new professional women’s league, Women’s Elite Rugby
