= Tom Stephenson (rugby union) =

English rugby union player

- Born: Thomas Frederick Stephenson; 5 May 1994 (age 32) Oxford, England
- Height: 1.90 m (6 ft 3 in)
- Weight: 90 kg (14 st 2 lb; 198 lb)

Rugby union career
- Position: Centre
- Current team: Rosslyn Park
Senior career
Years	Team	Apps	(Points)
2012–2018	Northampton	54	(36)
2018–2020	London Irish		
2020–	Rosslyn Park		
- Correct as of 27 July 2020

Tom Stephenson (born 5 May 1992) is an English rugby union player who plays for Rosslyn Park in National League 1.

== Career ==
Stephenson is a former Moulton College student, and one of the most prominent prospects to emerge from the Saints Academy in recent years. Playing a year above age for England Under-18's, Stephenson captained the side as they returned home from the FIRA/AER tournament in Madrid as champions.

He made his first senior appearance for Northampton Saints in 2012 against Harlequins and became a staple member of the senior team for the 2013/14 and 2014/15 seasons. The 2013/14 saw Stephenson come off the bench in both the European Rugby Challenge Cup final and the Aviva Premiership final. Northampton won both games recording their first ever double winning season. Having already travelled with England Under-20s in 2012/13, Stephenson then went to New Zealand, picking up a Junior World Championship winners' medal for the second year on the bounce.

His run in the senior team has been marred by injuries in recent seasons, Stephenson only featured in two games for the Saints in 2015/16 due to injury and sat out the entire 2016/17 season after a double leg break during a pre-season friendly against Rotherham Titans.

It was announced on 30 May 2017 that Stephenson would join fellow Saints teammate Tom Collins in travelling to Australia for the summer to progress his rugby after returning from injury late in the season. The pair linked up with Randwick in Sydney.

On 27 March 2018 it was confirmed that Stephenson would be leaving his childhood club Northampton Saints after 5 years. He joined London Irish where he remained until July 2020.

He signed for National League 1 side Rosslyn Park ahead of the 2020–21 season.
