= Sean Lonsdale =

English rugby union lock

- Born: Sean Patrick Lonsdale; 7 June 1997 (age 29) Manchester
- Height: 6 ft 4 in (193 cm)
- Weight: 112 kg (247 lb)

Rugby union career
- Position: Lock
- Current team: Dragons
Senior career
Years	Team	Apps	(Points)
2014–2016	RGC 1404		
2016–2022	Exeter Chiefs	61	(25)
2016–2017	→ Taunton (loan)	24	(10)
2017–2018	→ Plymouth Albion (loan)	18	(5)
2022–2024	Dragons	30	(0)
2024–	Ealing Trailfinders	23	(0)
- Correct as of 11:49, 6 February 2024 (UTC)

Sean Patrick Lonsdale (born 7 June 1997) is a rugby union lock for Dragons in the United Rugby Championship.

== Career ==
Born in Manchester, Lonsdale was educated at Rydal Penrhos School in north Wales and played for RGC 1404 in the Welsh Championship, the second division of domestic rugby.

Lonsdale left RGC to join Exeter Chiefs in 2016, he spent time on loan at Taunton and Plymouth Albion. He made his debut for Exeter's first team on 3 February 2018 against Saracens at Sandy Park. On 5 January 2019 Lonsdale's last minute try against Bristol Bears saw Exeter return to the top of the Premiership Rugby table.

He joined Dragons in 2022, and is eligible to represent Wales through his Welsh-born mother.

On 28 May 2024, Lonsdale returned to England to sign for Ealing Trailfinders in the RFU Championship for the 2024–25 season.
