= James Lang (rugby union) =

Scotland international rugby union player

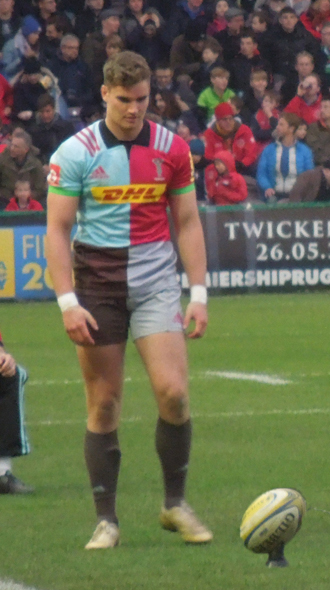
- Lang attempting a place kick, 2017
- Born: 4 April 1995 (age 31) Ashford, England
- Height: 6 ft (183 cm)
- Weight: 95 kg (209 lb; 14 st 13 lb)
- University: St Mary’s University, Bangor University

Rugby union career
- Position: Fly-half/Centre
- Current team: Edinburgh Rugby
Senior career
Years	Team	Apps	(Points)
2016–2021	Harlequins	79	(214)
2021–2026	Edinburgh Rugby	38	(5)
- Correct as of 17 April 2023
International career
Years	Team	Apps	(Points)
2018–2021	Scotland	6	(0)
- Correct as of 13 April 2023

James Lang (born 4 April 1995) is a Scottish rugby union player who currently plays for Harlequins Rugby Union club, in the Gallagher premiership.

== Rugby Union career ==
=== Amateur career ===
Born a few miles from Harlequins rugby union side's Twickenham Stoop, in Ashford, Middlesex. Lang represented Harlequins first, at school boy level. His burgeoning rugby career took off, when as a teenager Lang joined Welsh side Rygbi Gogledd Cymru (RGC1404) in North Wales.

=== Professional career ===
In the summer of 2016 the 22-year-old Lang returned from Rygbi Gogledd Cymru to Harlequins academy. He has since made several successful appearances as Fly-Half for Quins.

Characteristic of Lang's style on the rugby field is his strong and accurate kicking. Lang himself has mentioned working with former Quins Fly-half Nick Evans. Which benefited him in his own similar role. Lang plays at Fly-half in the Harlequins academy and first team.

Lang signed a pre-contract agreement with United Rugby Championship side Edinburgh Rugby in January 2021, alongside fellow Harlequins player Glen Young.

=== International career ===
Lang's first played for Scotland at U18 level in 2013. Five years later he was named as a member of the Scottish squad for the summer tour to Canada, United States and Argentina. Lang one of six uncapped players ahead of the tour, under the guidance of Scotland coach Gregor Townsend.

Lang received his first senior cap against Canada on 9 June 2018.
