= Tom Collins (rugby union, born 1994) =

English rugby union player

- Born: Tom Collins; 3 July 1994 (age 32) Northampton, England
- Height: 1.80 m (5 ft 11 in)
- Weight: 84 kg (13 st 3 lb; 185 lb)

Rugby union career
- Position: Wing/Centre
- Current team: Oundle
Senior career
Years	Team	Apps	(Points)
2010–2023	Northampton Saints	145	(165)
2013	→ Coventry	2	(10)
2015–2016	→ Moseley	5	(20)
2016	→ Rotherham Titans	3	(5)
2023-2026	Ealing Trailfinders		
2026	Oundle		
- Correct as of 12 August 2026
International career
Years	Team	Apps	(Points)
2013-2014	England U20	0	(0)

Tom Collins (born 3 July 1994) is an English rugby union player who currently plays for National League 2 East side Oundle. Collins typically plays on the wing.

Collins previously played for the youth team for Northampton Town, the local football club, as did his father and grandfather.

Collins, a product of the Saints' Academy, first made his impression at senior level at the club after he was a part of the Northampton side who beat Leicester Tigers in the Aviva Premiership semi-final.

After an impressive 2014/2015 season, Collins was made the LV Breakthrough Player of the Year.

Collins has recently become a regular fixture in Saints' second side the Wanderers as well as featuring in their Premiership 7s side. Most recently the winger helped the Wanderers lift the 2016/17 Aviva 'A' League trophy, scoring twice as the Wanderers took a 36–15 win over Gloucester United to seal the title.

It was announced, on 30 May 2017, that Collins and fellow Saints teammate Tom Stephenson would travel to Australia for the summer to develop their rugby before returning for the start of the 2017/18 Aviva Premiership season.

It was announced on 19/4/23 that Tom would be leaving Northampton Saints at the end of the 2022/2023 season.

In August 2026, he joined Oundle.
