= Rishworth School =

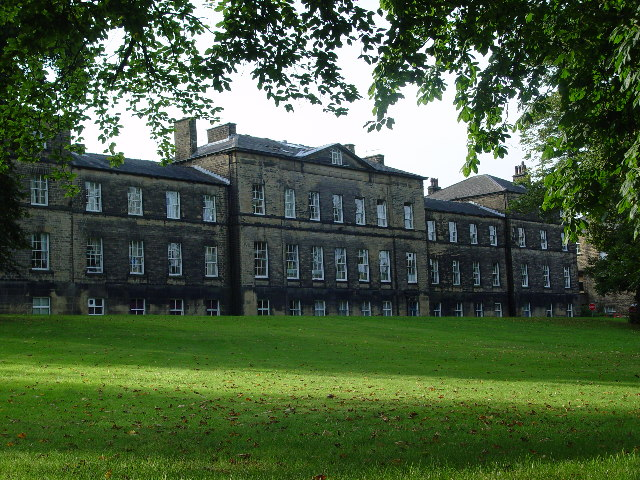

Location
- Oldham Road; Rishworth, West Yorkshire, HX6 4QA; England
- Coordinates: 53.663415°N 1.950052°W

Information
- Type: Private School
- Motto: Latin: Res Non Verba (Deeds, Not Words)
- Religious affiliation: Church Of England
- Established: 1724; 302 years ago
- Founder: John Wheelwright
- Local authority: Calderdale
- Chair: Canon Hilary Barber, Vicar of Halifax
- Age: 3 to 18 (3-11 Heathfield, 11-18 Rishworth)
- Capacity: ~500
- Houses: Baitings (Green), Boothwood (Blue), Ringstone (Red) and Scammonden (Yellow)
- Colour: Burgundy
- Website: www.rishworth-school.co.uk

Rishworth School is a co-educational private school in the village of Rishworth, near Halifax, in West Yorkshire, England. With Heathfield, its junior school from the ages of 3 to 11, it provides education for pupils aged between 3 and 18 years, with boarding from the age of 11.

== History ==
The school was founded and endowed by John Wheelwright in 1724 and established in a building which is now the school chapel. When the Wheelwright Building was built in 1826 the old building was converted into a chapel for the people of Rishworth, until St John's Church, Rishworth opened at the end of the 19th century. Other school buildings near the Wheelwright building were built in 1930, 1933 and 1950. Today the school extends over 130 acres (0.53 km^{2}) with a range of buildings developed to accommodate pupils.

More recently, in 1963, a new Music and Drama building was opened, and by 1984, a new teaching block was opened, consisting of four science laboratories, a large assembly hall, and numerous other classrooms hosting Mathematics, English and Modern Languages. An extension to the teaching block was completed in 1988 which saw the addition of a two-storey Design and Technology department, along with workshops.

The school is a founder member of the Society of Headmasters & Headmistresses of Independent Schools, established in 1961 through the then Headmasters' Conference.

== Inspection ==
Rishworth School was most recently inspected by the Independent Schools' Inspectorate in November 2017. The school received the highest grading of excellent in all categories and more specifically with reference to pupils' academic and personal development.

== The sixth form ==
Most pupils seeking entry to higher education take four subjects at AS Level in the Lower Sixth and then specialise in three of these to full A Level in the Upper Sixth.

== Notable former pupils ==
=== Stage, film, television ===
- John Noakes – Blue Peter presenter
- Eric Portman, actor
