= Griffins Rugby =

- Full name: Griffins Rugby
- Founded: 2008
- Location: Allen, Texas, United States.
- Ground: Celebration Park
- Chairman: Phil Camm

Official website
- www.griffinsrugby.com

Dallas Griffins Rugby, formerly Frisco Griffins, is a rugby union team based in Allen, Texas, United States, founded in 2008 by Phil Camm and Jeff Walton. Dallas competed in USA Rugby's first tier amateur competition, Red River Conference D1, and was a member of Major League Rugby at its foundation. The organization was later sold to a new ownership group and rebranded as the Dallas Jackals in preparation for the start of Major League Rugby.

== History ==
The Frisco Griffins, formed in 2008, initially played out of Dr. Pink Field in Frisco, Texas, within the Dallas-Fort Worth metroplex.

In May 2017, Dallas was one of the original nine members of Major League Rugby at the announcement of the creation of the new competition and has remained a non-playing member. The Griffins signed former Bath Rugby head coach Mike Ford the following month, but elected to push back their involvement until a later date. In June 2020, MLR announced that a group led by Dallas Mavericks’ GM Donnie Nelson and Neil Leibman of the Texas Ranger would be rebranding as the Dallas Jackals and representing Dallas in the league.
