= 2017–18 Premiership Rugby =

Rugby union competition in England

2017–18 Aviva Premiership
- Countries: England
- Date: 1 September 2017 – 26 May 2018
- Champions: Saracens (4th title)
- Runners-up: Exeter Chiefs
- Relegated: London Irish
- Matches played: 135
- Attendance: 1,912,301 (average 14,165 per match)
- Tries scored: 784 (average 5.8 per match)
- Top point scorer: Owen Farrell (Saracens) (217 points)
- Top try scorer: Josh Adams (Worcester), Vereniki Goneva (Newcastle), Christian Wade (Wasps) (13 tries)

Official website
- www.premiershiprugby.com

The 2017–18 Aviva Premiership was the 31st season of the top flight English domestic rugby union competition and the eighth and final one to be sponsored by Aviva. The reigning champions entering the season were Exeter Chiefs, who had claimed their first title after defeating Wasps in the 2017 final. London Irish had been promoted as champions from the 2016–17 RFU Championship at the first attempt.

The competition was broadcast by BT Sport for the fifth successive season and with five games also simulcast free-to-air on Channel 5 for the first time. Highlights of each weekend's games were shown on Channel 5 with extended highlights on BT Sport.

== Summary ==
Saracens won their fourth title after defeating Exeter Chiefs in the final at Twickenham after having finished second in the regular season table. London Irish were relegated after being unable to win their penultimate game of the season. It was the third time that London Irish have been relegated from the top flight since the leagues began and the first time since the 2015–16 Premiership Rugby season.

As usual, round 1 included the London Double Header at Twickenham, the fourteenth instance since its inception in 2004.

== Teams ==
Twelve teams compete in the league – the top eleven teams from the previous season and London Irish who were promoted from the 2016–17 RFU Championship after a top flight absence of one year. They replaced Bristol Bears who were relegated after one year in the top flight.

=== Stadiums and locations ===
2017–18 Aviva Premiership Teams

Club	Director of Rugby/ Head Coach	Captain	Kit supplier	Stadium	Capacity	City/Area
Bath	(New Zealand) Todd Blackadder	(England) Matt Garvey	Canterbury	The Recreation Ground (Note: Bath will also play a home game at Twickenham Stadium on 7 April 2018)	14,509	Bath
Exeter Chiefs	(England) Rob Baxter	(England) Jack Yeandle	Samurai Sportswear	Sandy Park	12,800	Exeter
Gloucester	(Ireland) David Humphreys	(England) Willi Heinz	XBlades	Kingsholm	16,500	Gloucester
Harlequins	(England) John Kingston	(Australia) James Horwill	Adidas	Twickenham Stoop (Note: Harlequins will also play a home game at Twickenham Stadium on 30 December 2017)	14,800	Twickenham, Greater London
Leicester Tigers	(Australia) Matt O'Connor	(England) Tom Youngs	Kukri	Welford Road	25,849	Leicester
London Irish	(Ireland) Declan Kidney (Note: Kidney replaced Nick Kennedy as DoR on 22 May 2018)	(South Africa) Franco van der Merwe	XBlades	Madejski Stadium (Note: London Irish will also play a home game at Twickenham Stadium on 2 September 2017)	24,161	Reading
Newcastle Falcons	(England) Dean Richards	(England) Will Welch	ISC	Kingston Park (Note: Newcastle Falcons will also play a home game at Talen Energy Stadium on 16 September 2017 and at St James' Park on 24 March 2018)	10,200	Newcastle upon Tyne
Northampton Saints	(Australia) Alan Gaffney (Note: (interim))	(England) Dylan Hartley	Macron	Franklin's Gardens	15,500	Northampton
Sale Sharks	(England) Steve Diamond	(Ireland) Will Addison	Samurai Sportswear	AJ Bell Stadium	12,000	Salford, Greater Manchester
Saracens	(Ireland) Mark McCall	(England) Brad Barritt	BLK	Allianz Park (Note: Saracens will also play a home game at Twickenham Stadium on 2 September 2017 and at London Stadium on 24 March 2018)	10,000 (Note: Allianz Park typically has a capacity of 10,000 but this can be raised to 15,000 with temporary seating)	Hendon, Greater London
Wasps	(Wales) Dai Young	(England) Joe Launchbury	Under Armour	Ricoh Arena	32,609	Coventry
Worcester Warriors	(South Africa) Alan Solomons	(Ireland) Donncha O'Callaghan	Under Armour	Sixways Stadium	12,024	Worcester

== Pre-season ==
The 2017 edition of the Singha Premiership Rugby Sevens was held on 28 and 29 July at Franklin's Gardens. For the first time all twelve Premiership teams featured together in one venue over two days. Teams were split into four pools of three which played each other in a round-robin basis with the tournament splitting into Cup, Plate and Bowl finals on the second day.

== Table ==
2017–18 Premiership Rugby Table
Pos	Team	Pld	W	D	L	PF	PA	PD	TF	TA	TB	LB	Pts	Qualification or relegation
1	Exeter Chiefs (RU)	22	17	0	5	618	354	+264	79	42	13	4	85	Play-off place, Berth in the 2018–19 European Rugby Champions Cup
2	Saracens (C)	22	16	0	6	731	350	+381	89	40	10	3	77	Play-off place, Berth in the 2018–19 European Rugby Champions Cup
3	Wasps (SF)	22	14	1	7	615	501	+114	76	57	10	3	71	Play-off place, Berth in the 2018–19 European Rugby Champions Cup
4	Newcastle Falcons (SF)	22	14	0	8	455	506	−51	55	60	7	0	63	Play-off place, Berth in the 2018–19 European Rugby Champions Cup
5	Leicester Tigers	22	13	0	9	537	472	+65	61	55	5	6	63	Berth in the 2018–19 European Rugby Champions Cup
6	Bath	22	11	0	11	572	531	+41	63	68	8	4	56	Berth in the 2018–19 European Rugby Champions Cup
7	Gloucester	22	11	1	10	490	597	−107	65	73	8	2	56	Berth in the 2018–19 European Rugby Champions Cup (Note: Berth based on being the runners-up of the 2017–18 European Rugby Challenge Cup. This is due to the 2017–18 European Rugby Champions Cup winners (Leinster) and the Challenge Cup winners (Cardiff Blues) both qualifying for the 2018–19 European Rugby Champions Cup through their domestic leagues position.)
8	Sale Sharks	22	10	0	12	556	531	+25	63	57	9	5	54	2018–19 European Rugby Challenge Cup
9	Northampton Saints	22	8	0	14	509	645	−136	64	80	5	6	43	2018–19 European Rugby Challenge Cup
10	Harlequins	22	7	0	15	479	640	−161	58	78	5	3	36	2018–19 European Rugby Challenge Cup
11	Worcester Warriors	22	7	0	15	432	601	−169	54	74	5	3	36	2018–19 European Rugby Challenge Cup
12	London Irish (Note: The champion of the Championship (Bristol Bears) are eligible for promotion) (R)	22	3	0	19	385	651	−266	42	85	3	7	22	Relegated

Source: Premiership Rugby
Rules for classification: Tiebreakers for teams tied on points: 1) Number of matches won; 2) Difference between points for and against; 3) Total number of points for; 4) Aggregate number of points scored in matches between tied teams; 5) Number of matches won excluding the first match, then the second and so on until the tie is settled
(C) Champions; (RU) Runners-up; (SF) Losing semi-finalists; (R) Relegated

== Regular season ==
Fixtures for the season were announced by Premiership Rugby on 7 July 2017. As is the norm, round 1 included the London Double Header at Twickenham. After success in 2016 a match would once again take place in the United States with Newcastle Falcons hosting Saracens at the Talen Energy Stadium in the Philadelphia suburb of Chester, Pennsylvania in round 3.

All fixtures are subject to change.

=== Round 1 ===
1 September 2017
19:45

(1 BP) Gloucester	28–21	Exeter Chiefs (1 BP)
Try: Thrush (2) 24' c, 39' c Morgan 55' c Woodward 80+1' c Con: B. Burns (3/3) 25', 39, 56'; Twelvetrees (1/1) 80+2'	Report	Try: S. Simmonds (2) 3' c, 28' c Woodburn 70' c Con: Steenson (2/2) 5', 29'; Slade (1/1) 70'

Kingsholm
Attendance: 15,547
Referee: Matthew Carley

1 September 2017
19:45

(1 BP) Newcastle Falcons	35–8	Worcester Warriors
Try: A. Tait 4' c Vickers 51' c Cooper 61' m J. Socino 74' c Con: Takulua (2/3) 5', 52'; Willis (1/1) 75'; Pen: Takulua (3/3) 20', 49', 66'	Report	Try: Adams 46' m Pen: Heathcote (1/2) 27'

Kingston Park
Attendance: 5,875
Referee: Wayne Barnes

2 September 2017
14:00

(1 BP) Saracens	55–24	Northampton Saints
Try: Barritt 8' m Wigglesworth 11' c Maitland (3) 20' m, 31' m, 34' m Lozowski 28' c Koch 37' c Brits 51' c B. Spencer 67' c Con: Lozowski (5/9) 12', 29', 38', 52', 68'	Report	Try: Ludlam 43' c Wood (2) 55' c, 64' c Con: Mallinder (3/3) 44', 56', 64'; Pen: Mallinder (1/2) 24'

Twickenham Stadium
Attendance: 56,532
Referee: Craig Maxwell-Keys

2 September 2016
15:00

(1 BP) Wasps	50–35	Sale Sharks (1 BP)
Try: Robson (4) 2' c, 13' c, 32' c, 43' m Wade 16' c Rowlands 69' c Rieder 73' c Con: Gopperth (6/7) 3', 14', 17', 33', 70', 74'; Pen: Gopperth (1/1) 25'	Report	Try: McGuigan 21' c B. Curry 34' c Solomona 55' c de Klerk 59' c Strauss 77' c Con: MacGinty (5/5) 21', 35', 56', 60', 77'

Ricoh Arena
Attendance: 12,018
Referee: JP Doyle

2 September 2017
16:45

(1 BP) London Irish	39–29	Harlequins (1 BP)
Try: Ojo 23' c Bell 30' m Treviranus 56' m McKibbin 78' c Con: Bell (2/4) 24', 79'; Pen: Bell (5/6) 4', 7', 37', 52', 75'	Report	Try: Marchant 34' c Yarde 63' c Care 72' m Walker 77' c Con: M. Smith (1/1) 34'; Catrakilis (2/3) 64', 77'; Pen: M. Smith (1/1) 15'

Twickenham Stadium
Attendance: 56,532
Referee: Tom Foley

3 September 2017
15:00

(1 BP) Leicester Tigers	23–27	Bath
Try: M. Tuilagi 23' m May (2) 72' m, 77' c Con: G. Ford (1/3) 78'; Pen: G. Ford (2/2) 20', 58'	Report	Try: Clark (2) 26' c, 31' c Rokoduguni 34' c Con: Priestland (3/3) 27', 31', 36'; Pen: Priestland (2/2) 55', 62'

Welford Road
Attendance: 22,582
Referee: Luke Pearce

=== Round 2 ===
8 September 2017
19:45

(1 BP) Sale Sharks	12–13	Newcastle Falcons
Pen: MacGinty (4/4) 18', 48', 56', 59'	Report	Try: Penalty try 73'; Pen: Takulua (2/2) 45', 51'

AJ Bell Stadium
Attendance: 4,510
Referee: Andrew Jackson

9 September 2017
14:00

Bath	31–21	Saracens
Try: Louw 23' m Rokoduguni (2) 76' c, 80+1' c Con: F. Burns (2/2) 77', 80+2'; Pen: Priestland (2/2) 35', 40+2'; Drop: Priestland (2/2) 17', 53'	Report	Try: Penalty try 57'; B. Spencer 72' m Pen: Lozowski (1/2) 41'; Farrell (2/2) 50', 66'

Recreation Ground
Attendance: 14,482
Referee: Wayne Barnes

9 September 2017
15:00

(1 BP) Exeter Chiefs	37–7	London Irish
Try: Slade 11' m Penalty try 24'; Armand (2) 33' m, 80' c Woodburn 75' c Con: Steenson (2/4) 76', 80'; Pen: Steenson (2/2) 8', 45'	Report	Try: Lewington 71' c Con: Bell (1/1) 72'

Sandy Park
Attendance: 8,536
Referee: Craig Maxwell-Keys

9 September 2017
15:00

Harlequins	28–17	Gloucester
Try: Ward 28' c Walker 37' c Yarde 67' m Con: Smith (2/3) 29' 38'; Pen: Catrakilis (1/1) 9'; Smith (2/3) 55' 60'	Report	Try: Clarke 52' c Rowan 80' c Con: B. Burns (1/1) 52'; Twelvetrees (1/1) 80+1'; Pen: B. Burns (1/1) 12'

Twickenham Stoop
Attendance: 12,919
Referee: Luke Pearce

9 September 2017
16:30

Northampton Saints	24–11	Leicester Tigers
Try: Burrell 11' c Hartley 27' c Collins 67' c Con: Mallinder (3/3) 12', 28', 68'; Pen: Mallinder (1/2) 40+6'	Report	Try: May 79' m Pen: G. Ford (2/3) 34', 57'

Franklin's Gardens
Attendance: 15,203
Referee: JP Doyle

10 September 2017
15:00

Worcester Warriors	10–24	Wasps
Try: Alo 38' c Con: Heathcote (1/1) 39'; Pen: Olver (1/2) 56'	Report	Try: M. Watson 21' c le Roux 67'c Bassett 77' c Con: Gopperth (3/3) 22'; Pen: Gopperth (1/1) 18'

Sixways Stadium
Attendance: 7,735
Referee: Tom Foley

=== Round 3 ===
15 September 2017
19:45

(1 BP) Northampton Saints	24–6	Bath
Try: Lawes 3' m Ribbans (2) 38' c, 52' m North 74' c Con: Mallinder (2/4) 40', 76'	Report	Pen: Priestland (2/2) 26', 32'

Franklin's Gardens
Attendance: 12,457
Referee: Tom Foley

15 September 2017
19:45

Worcester Warriors	10–41	Exeter Chiefs (1 BP)
Try: Alo 47' c Con: Olver (1/1) 48'; Pen: Olver (1/1) 16'	Report	Try: S. Simmonds (2) 24' c, 72' c Nowell 34' c Hill 39' c Woodburn 62' c Con: Steenson (5/5) 24', 35', 40' 63', 73'; Pen: Steenson (2/2) 1', 55'

Sixways
Attendance: 7,023
Referee: Ian Tempest

15 September 2017
20:00

(1 BP) Sale Sharks	36–7	London Irish
Try: R. Harrison 13' c Solomona (2) 18' c, 25' c Charnley 55' c Jennings 69' m Con: MacGinty (4/5) 14', 19', 26', 57'; Pen: MacGinty (1/1) 8'	Report	Try: Penalty try 65'

AJ Bell Stadium
Attendance: 4,572
Referee: Wayne Barnes

16 September 2017
15:00

Leicester Tigers	24–10	Gloucester
Try: B. Youngs (2) 8' c, 14' c Malouf 20' c Con: G. Ford (3/3) 9', 16', 22'; Pen: G. Ford (1/1) 63'	Report	Try: Hohneck 41' c Con: Twelvetrees (1/1) 42'; Pen: Twelvetrees (1/1) 48'

Welford Road
Attendance: 20,008
Referee: Craig Maxwell-Keys

16 September 2017
17:10 (Note: Kick off time local to Pennsylvania; 22:10 BST in England.)

Newcastle Falcons	7–29	Saracens
Try: Goneva 25' c Con: Takulua (1/1) 26'	Report	Try: Wyles 7' c Penalty try 74'; Con: Farrell (1/1) 8'; Pen: Farrell (5/5) 32', 40+3', 44', 50', 56'

Talen Energy Stadium, Philadelphia
Attendance: 6,271
Referee: JP Doyle

17 September 2017
15:00

(1 BP) Wasps	21–24	Harlequins
Try: Wade 13' c Cruse 53' m Con: Cipriani (1/2) 14'; Pen: Cipriani (3/4) 4', 36', 61'	Report	Try: Yarde 22' m Walker 42' c Con: Smith (1/2) 43'; Pen: Smith (4/4) 2' 20' 66' 71'

Ricoh Arena
Attendance: 15,308
Referee: Andrew Jackson

=== Round 4 ===
22 September 2017
19:45

Gloucester	24–19	Worcester Warriors (1 BP)
Try: Thorley (2) 12' c, 15' c Twelvetrees 41' c Con: B. Burns (3/3) 13', 17', 41'; Pen: B. Burns (1/1) 9'	Report	Try: Humphreys (2) 59' m, 70' m Pen: Mills (3/3) 25', 38', 74'

Kingsholm
Attendance: 12,430
Referee: Wayne Barnes

23 September 2017
15:00

(2 BP) Bath	32–33	Newcastle Falcons (1 BP)
Try: Banahan 28' c Rokoduguni 44' m Ewels 47' c Joseph 54' c Con: Priestland (3/4) 29', 47', 56'; Pen: Priestland (2/2) 39', 42'	Report	Try: Takulua 8' c Vickers 11' c van der Merwe 17' m Harris 66' c M. Wilson 75' c Con: Takulua (2/3) 9', 13'; Hodgson (2/2) 67', 76'

Recreation Ground
Attendance: 14,121
Referee: Craig Maxwell-Keys

23 September 2017
15:00

(1 BP) Harlequins	28–31	Leicester Tigers
Try: Care 43' c Luamanu 45' m Alofa 62' c Con: M. Smith (1/2) 44'; Swiel (1/1) 63'; Pen: M. Smith (3/3) 3', 17', 25'	Report	Try: Veainu 10' m May 52' c Bateman 56' c Con: G. Ford (2/3) 53', 57'; Pen: G. Ford (4/4) 5', 37', 66', 72'

Twickenham Stoop
Attendance: 14,418
Referee: Ian Tempest

23 September 2017
15:00

(1 BP) Saracens	41–13	Sale Sharks
Try: B. Spencer (2) 3' c, 51' c Li. Williams 8' c Koch 63' c Earle 77' c Con: Farrell (5/5) 4', 10', 52', 64', 79'; Pen: Farrell (2/2) 32', 50'	Report	Try: McGuigan (2) 65' m, 80' m Pen: de Klerk (1/1) 25'

Allianz Park
Attendance: 9,243
Referee: Tom Foley

24 September 2017
15:00

(1 BP) Exeter Chiefs	31–17	Wasps
Try: Woodburn (2) 8' m, 37' c Dennis 19' m Armand 25' c Malton 59' c Con: Steenson (3/5) 26, 38', 60'	Report	Try: A. Johnson 11' c Bassett 62' c Con: Gopperth (2/2) 12', 63'; Pen: Gopperth (1/2) 17'

Sandy Park
Attendance: 11,858
Referee: JP Doyle

24 September 2017
15:00

London Irish	25–40	Northampton Saints (1 BP)
Try: Lewington 48' c Bell 64' m McNally 80' c Con: Bell (1/2) 50'; Tonks (1/1) 80+2'; Pen: Bell (2/2) 11', 40'	Report	Try: Groom 1' c Horne (2) 5' c, 25' m Haywood 31' c North 53' c Reinach 77' c Con: Mallinder (5/6) 2', 6', 33', 54, 78'

Madejski Stadium
Attendance: 5,502
Referee: Matthew Carley

=== Round 5 ===
29 September 2017
19:45

Newcastle Falcons	29–17	London Irish
Try: J. Socino 18' c Goneva (2) 21' c, 26' c Welch 59' m Con: Takulua (3/4) 20', 22', 27'; Pen: Takulua (1/2) 15'	Report	Try: Gilsenan 66' c Fowlie 69' c Con: Bell (2/2) 66', 70'; Pen: Bell (1/1) 3'

Kingston Park
Attendance: 7,650
Referee: Ian Tempest

29 September 2017
19:45

Worcester Warriors	3–25	Saracens
Pen: Shillcock (1/1) 30'	Report	Try: Wyles (2) 5' c, 75' c Goode 51' m Con: Lozowski (1/2) 6'; Farrell (1/1) 76'; Pen: Lozowski (1/1) 11'

Sixways
Attendance: 7,517
Referee: Craig Maxwell-Keys

29 September 2017
20:00

(1 BP) Sale Sharks	57–10	Gloucester
Try: Solomona (2) 0' c, 50' c McGuigan (3) 15' c, 32' m, 72' c de Klerk 47' c O'Connor 55' c James 68' c Con: MacGinty (6/7) 1', 17', 49', 51', 57', 69'; Cliff (1/1) 74'; Pen: MacGinty (1/1) 39'	Report	Try: Afoa 76' c Con: B. Burns (1/1) 76'; Pen: B. Burns (1/1) 7'

AJ Bell Stadium
Attendance: 5,123
Referee: JP Doyle

30 September 2017
15:00

Leicester Tigers	20–13	Exeter Chiefs (1 BP)
Try: Malouf 24' c May 66' c Con: G. Ford (2/2) 26', 68'; Pen: G. Ford (1/1) 48'; Drop: G. Ford (1/1) 36'	Report	Try: Penalty try 56'; Pen: Steenson (2/3) 4', 80'

Welford Road
Attendance: 23,018
Referee: Tom Foley

30 September 2017
15:00

(1 BP) Northampton Saints	30–22	Harlequins
Try: North 7' m Collins 21' c Haywood 37' c Tuala 42' m Con: Mallinder (2/4) 22' 38'; Pen: Mallinder (1/2) 49'; Myler (1/1) 77'	Report	Try: Morris 11' c Roberts 40+1' m Ward 63' c Con: Smith (2/3) 12, 64'; Pen: Smith (1/2) 35'

Franklin's Gardens
Attendance: 12,806
Referee: Luke Pearce

1 October 2017
15:00

Wasps	9–25	Bath
Pen: Gopperth (3/3) 5', 12', 32'	Report	Try: Rokoduguni 76' c Con: F. Burns (1/1) 77'; Pen: Priestland (3/3) 11', 17', 44'; F. Burns (2/3) 48', 73'; Drop: Priestland (1/1) 28'

Ricoh Arena
Attendance: 15,488
Referee: Matthew Carley

=== Round 6 ===
6 October 2017
19:45

(1 BP) Harlequins	42–26	Sale Sharks (1 BP)
Try: Visser (2) 11' c, 47' m Marler 20' c Marchant 23' c Yarde 75' c Con: M. Smith (4/5) 12', 21', 24', 76'; Pen: M. Smith (3/3) 37', 40+3', 60'	Report	Try: Haley 31' c Aulika 54' m James 64' c Webber 73' c Con: MacGinty (1/1) 32' de Klerk (2/3) 65', 73'

Twickenham Stoop
Attendance: 14,128
Referee: Matthew Carley

7 October 2017
15:00

(1 BP) Bath	29–13	Worcester Warriors
Try: Joseph 9' c Brew (2) 29' m, 58' c Tapuai 39' c Con: F. Burns (3/4) 9', 40', 60'; Pen: J. Lewis (1/1) 75'	Report	Try: Hammond 21' m Shillcock 45' m Pen: Shillcock (1/2) 12'

Recreation Ground
Attendance: 14,509
Referee: Luke Pearce

7 October 2017
15:00

(1 BP) Exeter Chiefs	34–24	Newcastle Falcons (1 BP)
Try: White 9' c Turner 20' c S. Simmonds 34' c Penalty try 62'; Con: Steenson (3/3) 10' 21' 35'; Pen: Steenson (2/2) 17', 43'	Report	Try: Welch 31' m J. Socino 37' m A. Tait 58' c Goneva 75' c Con: Flood (2/2) 59', 76'

Sandy Park
Attendance: 9,624
Referee: Andrew Jackson

7 October 2017
15:00

(1 BP) Gloucester	29–24	Northampton Saints (1 BP)
Try: Trinder (2) 8' m, 40+1 m Woodward 47' m Twelvetrees 58' c Heinz 62' c Con: O. Williams (2/5) 59', 63'	Report	Try: Gibson 17' c Mallinder 42' c Haywood 68' c Con: Mallinder (2/2) 18', 43'; Myler (1/1) 69'; Pen: Mallinder (1/3) 57'

Kingsholm
Attendance: 12,711
Referee: Wayne Barnes

7 October 2017
15:00

(1 BP) London Irish	27–28	Leicester Tigers
Try: Cowan 55' c Paice 68' c Lewington 80' c Con: Bell (3/3) 56', 69', 80+1'; Pen: Bell (2/2) 32', 46'	Report	Try: Malouf 2' m W. Evans 41' c May 61'; Con: G. Ford (2/3) 43', 62; Pen: G. Ford (3/3) 8', 17', 26'

Madejski Stadium
Attendance: 6,188
Referee: JP Doyle

8 October 2017
15:00

(1 BP) Saracens	38–19	Wasps
Try: Wyles 6' m George (3) 11' c, 49' c, 64' c Con: Lozowski (3/4) 12', 51', 65'; Pen: Lozowski (4/4) 15', 33', 42', 46'	Report	Try: Moore 23' c Willis 68' c Bassett 80+1' m Con: Miller (2/3) 24', 68'

Allianz Park
Attendance: 10,000
Referee: Ian Tempest

=== Round 7 ===
27 October 2017
19:45

(1 BP) Sale Sharks	6–10	Exeter Chiefs
Pen: de Klerk (2/3) 34', 57'	Report	Try: Turner 43' c Con: Steenson (1/1) 44'; Pen: Steenson (1/1) 30'

AJ Bell Stadium
Attendance: 6,490
Referee: Craig Maxwell-Keys

28 October 2017
15:00

Northampton Saints	22–38	Wasps (1 BP)
Try: Tuala 17' m Mallinder 77' m Pen: P. Francis (4/4) 10', 34', 53', 57'	Report	Try: Wade 31' c A. Johnson 42' m Bassett 59' c de Jongh 75' c Con: Wade (1/1) 32'; Gopperth (2/3) 60', 76'; Pen: Gopperth (4/4) 7', 13', 27', 65'

Franklin's Gardens
Attendance: 15,109
Referee: Luke Pearce

28 October 2017
15:00

(1 BP) Harlequins	41–35	Worcester Warriors (2 BP)
Try: M. Smith 3' c Luamanu 40' c Care 44' c Roberts 54' c Walker 63' c Con: M. Smith (5/5) 4', 40', 46', 55', 64'; Pen: M. Smith (1/2) 21'; Swiel (1/1) 72'	Report	Try: Denton 6' m Humphreys 8' m Adams 28' m Hammond (2) 65' m, 74' m Singleton 77' c Con: Heathcote (1/3) 78'; Pen: Lance (1/2) 23'

Twickenham Stoop
Attendance: 14,445
Referee: JP Doyle

28 October 2017
15:00

(1 BP) Saracens	44–13	London Irish
Try: M. Vunipola 9' c Farrell 45' c L. Williams 58' c Wyles 60' c Earle (2) 65'm 79' m Con: Farrell (4/6) 10', 46', 59', 62'; Pen: Farrell (2/3) 31, 40+1	Report	Try: Paice 49' c Con: Bell (1/1) 50'; Pen: Bell (2/2) 4', 26'

Allianz Park
Attendance: 10,000
Referee: Andrew Jackson

29 October 2017
15:00

Newcastle Falcons	13–30	Leicester Tigers
Try: Goneva 38' c Con: Flood (1/1) 39'; Pen: Flood (2/2) 14', 41'	Report	Try: Veainu 10' c B. Youngs 17' c May 70' c Con: G. Ford (3/3) 11', 18', 72'; Pen: G. Ford (3/3) 52', 65', 69'

Kingston Park
Attendance: 10,100
Referee: Wayne Barnes

29 October 2017
15:00

(1 BP) Bath	21–22	Gloucester
Try: Rokoduguni (2) 13' m, 75' c Con: Priestland (1/2) 76'; Pen: Priestland (3/5) 25', 49', 64'	Report	Try: Heinz (2) 4' m, 52' c Slater 80+4' c Con: O. Williams (2/2) 54', 80+7'; Pen: O. Williams (1/1) 46'

Recreation Ground
Attendance: 14,509
Referee: Tom Foley

=== Round 8 ===
17 November 2017
19:45

Gloucester	23–17	Saracens (1 BP)
Try: Thorley 60' c Hudson 66' c Con: Twelvetrees (2/2) 61', 68'; Pen: Twelvetrees (3/3) 7', 50', 57'	Report	Try: Brits 52' m Pen: Lozowski (3/5) 9', 17', 39'; B. Spencer (1/1) 80'

Kingsholm
Attendance: 12,871
Referee: Karl Dickson

18 November 2017
13:00

(1 BP) Worcester Warriors	30–15	Northampton Saints
Try: Heem (3) 23' m, 34' c, 80' c Adams 48' m Con: Lance (1/3) 35'; Pennell (1/1) 80+3'; Pen: Lance (2/3) 20', 44'	Report	Try: Foden 52' m Gibson 75' c Con: Myler (1/2) 76'; Pen: Myler (1/2) 4'

Sixways
Attendance: 7,450
Referee: Andrew Jackson

18 November 2017
17:15

(1 BP) Wasps	40–10	Newcastle Falcons
Try: Wade (2) 2' c, 9' m Eastmond 12' c Haskell 43' c Lovobalavu 58' c Bassett 73' c Con: Gopperth (5/6) 3', 14', 44', 59', 74'	Report	Try: Robinson 31' c Con: Flood (1/1) 32'; Pen: Flood (1/1) 7'

Ricoh Arena
Attendance: 16,073
Referee: Matthew O'Grady

19 November 2017
15:00

(1 BP) Exeter Chiefs	31–17	Harlequins
Try: Turner 4' c Woodburn 23' c Hill (2) 43' c, 67' c Con: Steenson (4/4) 5', 24', 44', 68'; Pen: Steenson (1/1) 79'	Report	Try: J. Chisholm 9' c Visser 33' c Con: M. Smith (2/2) 10', 34'; Pen: M. Smith (1/2) 40+1'

Sandy Park
Attendance: 12,598
Referee: JP Doyle

19 November 2017
15:00

(1 BP) Leicester Tigers	35–27	Sale Sharks (1 BP)
Try: Penalty try 23'; Genge 34' c Owen 65' c Malouf 76' m Con: J. Ford (2/3) 35', 66'; Pen: J. Ford (3/4) 9', 27', 47'	Report	Try: B. Curry 15' m Jennings 31' c Yarde 38' c Ross 50' m Con: de Klerk (2/4) 32', 39'; Pen: de Klerk (1/3) 4'

Welford Road
Attendance: 20,056
Referee: Luke Pearce

19 November 2017
15:00

(1 BP) London Irish	18–22	Bath
Try: Marshall 8' m Steele 74' c Con: Tonks (1/1) 75'; Pen: Bell (2/2) 2', 40'	Report	Try: Banahan 7' c Con: F. Burns (1/1) 8'; Pen: F. Burns (4/5) 13, 26, 46, 59'; Drop: F. Burns (1/1) 23'

Madejski Stadium
Attendance: 7,538
Referee: Tom Foley

=== Round 9 ===
24 November 2017
19:45

Newcastle Falcons	7–29	Gloucester Rugby (1 BP)
Try: M. Wilson 40' c Con: Hodgson (1/1) 40+1'	Report	Try: Symons 16' c Thrush 22' c Purdy 34' m Denman 67' c Con: Twelvetrees (3/4) 16', 24', 68'; Pen: Twelvetrees (1/1) 41'

Kingston Park
Attendance: 6,768
Referee: JP Doyle

25 November 2017
12:15

(1 BP) Bath	38–14	Harlequins
Try: Grant 1' c F. Burns 9' c Stooke 12' m Banahan 18' c Con: F. Burns (3/4) 2', 10', 19'; Pen: F. Burns (2/3) 38', 60'; J. Lewis (2/2) 71', 79'	Report	Try: Cheeseman 32' c Ibitoye 63' c Con: Lang (2/2) 33', 65'

Recreation Ground
Attendance: 14,509
Referee: Craig Maxwell-Keys

25 November 2017
15:00

(1 BP) Leicester Tigers	27–31	Worcester Warriors (1 BP)
Try: Fitzgerald 20' c S. Harrison 40+3' c Owen 78' c Con: J. Ford (3/3) 22', 40+4', 78'; Pen: J. Ford (2/2) 27', 65'	Report	Try: Fa'osiliva 3' m Adams (2) 6' c, 36' c Singleton 45' c Mills 72' m Con: Pennell (2/4) 7', 47'; Lance (1/1) 37'

Welford Road
Attendance: 21,112
Referee: Greg MacDonald

25 November 2017
17:30

Sale Sharks	18–15	Northampton Saints (1 BP)
Try: de Klerk 37' c B. Curry 43' m Con: de Klerk (1/2) 38'; Pen: de Klerk (1/1) 6'; Cliff (1/1) 62'	Report	Try: Reinach 12' m T. Harrison 20' c Con: Mallinder (1/2) 21'; Pen: Mallinder (1/1) 54'

AJ Bell Stadium
Attendance: 5,132
Referee: Karl Dickson

26 November 2017
15:00

(1 BP) London Irish	13–17	Wasps
Try: Lewington 51' c Con: Bell (1/1) 52'; Pen: Bell (2/2) 30' 60	Report	Try: A. Johnson 56' m Bassett 63' m Carr 66' c Con: Gopperth (1/3) 67'

Madejski Stadium
Attendance: 7,775
Referee: Christophe Ridley

26 November 2017
15:00

(1 BP) Saracens	18–20	Exeter Chiefs
Try: Goode 7' c Brits 13' m Con: B. Spencer (1/2) 8'; Pen: B. Spencer (1/1) 22'; Bosch (1/1) 54'	Report	Try: Whitten 50' c Low 72' c Con: Steenson (2/2) 51', 73'; Pen: Steenson (2/2) 6', 29'

Allianz Park
Attendance: 10,000
Referee: Ian Tempest

=== Round 10 ===
1 December 2017
19:45

(1 BP) Northampton Saints	22–24	Newcastle Falcons
Try: Mallinder 20' m Penalty try 33'; Hartley 59' c Con: P. Francis (1/1) 60'; Pen: P. Francis (1/1) 69'	Report	Try: Sinoti 24' c Matavesi 29' c Latu 79' c Con: Flood (2/2) 25', 29'; Takulua (1/1) 80'; Pen: Flood (1/1) 51'

Franklin's Gardens
Attendance: 11,007
Referee: Craig Maxwell-Keys

1 December 2017
19:45

(1 BP) Worcester Warriors	14–18	Sale Sharks
Try: Adams 32' m Pen: Pennell (3/3) 25', 61', 66'	Report	Try: Janse van Rensburg 13' m Jennings 69' c Con: MacGinty (1/2) 70'; Pen: MacGinty (2/2) 9', 40'

Sixways
Attendance: 7,327
Referee: Matthew Carley

2 December 2017
14:00

(1 BP) Exeter Chiefs	42–29	Bath (1 BP)
Try: Cowan-Dickie 7' c Short 15' c Lees 28' c Armand 34' c Waldrom 52' c Steenson 67' c Con: Steenson (6/6) 7', 16', 29', 35', 53', 68'	Report	Try: Joseph 65' c A. Watson 72' c Brew 75'; Banahan 79' c Con: Joseph (1/1) 66'; Priestland (2/2) 73', 80+1'; Pen: F. Burns (1/1) 27'

Sandy Park
Attendance: 12,800
Referee: JP Doyle

2 December 2017
15:00

(1 BP) Gloucester	39–15	London Irish
Try: Ludlow 10' c B. Burns (2) 36' c, 41' c Polledri 52' c Purdy 67' m Con: Twelvetrees (4/5) 11', 37', 42', 53'; Pen: Twelvetrees (2/2) 17', 22'	Report	Try: du Plessis 28' m Paulo 55' c Con: Bell (1/2) 56'; Pen: Bell (1/2) 13'

Kingsholm
Attendance: 12,351
Referee: Ian Tempest

2 December 2017
16:30

(1 BP) Wasps	32–25	Leicester Tigers (1 BP)
Try: Carr 22' c Robson 31' c Daly 62' m Myall 78' c Con: Gopperth (3/4) 23', 33' 80'; Pen: Daly (1/1) 36'; Gopperth (1/1) 58'	Report	Try: T. Youngs 13' c J. Holmes (2) 50' m, 56' c Con: G. Ford (2/3); Pen: G. Ford (2/3)

Ricoh Arena
Attendance: 22,148
Referee: Thomas Foley

3 December 2017
15:00

Harlequins	20–19	Saracens (1 BP)
Try: Walker (2) 25' m, 70' c Visser 78' m Con: Lang (1/3) 71'; Pen: Lang (1/1) 42'	Report	Try: Barritt 1' c Con: Farrell (1/1) 2'; Pen: Farrell (4/4) 8', 51', 60', 74'

Twickenham Stoop
Attendance: 14,800
Referee: Luke Pearce

=== Round 11 ===
22 December 2017
19:45

Worcester Warriors	23–8	London Irish
Try: Adams (2) 4' c, 40' c Con: Pennell (2/2) 5', 40+2'; Pen: Pennell (3/3) 21', 49', 53'	Report	Try: Lewington 37' m Pen: Tonks (1/1) 33'

Sixways
Attendance: 9,647
Referee: Wayne Barnes

23 December 2017
15:00

Newcastle Falcons	11–10	Harlequins (1 BP)
Try: Goneva 16' m Pen: Takalua (2/2) 13', 25'	Report	Try: Brown 42' c Con: M. Smith (1/1) 43'; Pen: M. Smith (1/1) 67'

Kingston Park
Attendance: 9,128
Referee: Luke Pearce

23 December 2017
15:00

Northampton Saints	14–35	Exeter Chiefs (1 BP)
Try: Tuala 19' c Reinach 75' c Con: P. Francis (2/2) 20', 76'	Report	Try: Chudley 11' m S. Simmonds 59' c Waldrom 72' c Yeandle 80+1' c Con: Steenson (2/3) 60', 73'; J. Simmonds (1/1) 80+2'; Pen: Steenson (3/3) 6', 31', 42'

Franklin's Gardens
Attendance: 15,120
Referee: Thomas Foley

23 December 2017
15:00

(1 BP) Sale Sharks	32–9	Bath
Try: Strauss 43' c McGuigan 47' m O'Connor 60' c Cliff 71' c Con: MacGinty (3/4) 43', 62', 72'; Pen: MacGinty (2/2) 13', 39'	Report	Pen: Priestland (3/3) 8', 11', 35'

AJ Bell Stadium
Attendance: 6,426
Referee: Ian Tempest

23 December 2017
15:00

(1 BP) Wasps	49–24	Gloucester (1 BP)
Try: le Roux 11' m Wade (2) 34' c, 77' c T. Young 48' c Thompson 66' c Robson 75' c Con: Cipriani (4/5) 35', 49', 68', 76' 78'; Pen: Cipriani (3/3) 31', 52', 58'	Report	Try: Heinz 16' c Atkinson 27' m T. Marshall 38' m Clarke 73' c Con: Twelvetrees (2/4) 16', 74'

Ricoh Arena
Attendance: 26,296
Referee: Craig Maxwell-Keys

24 December 2017
15:00

Leicester Tigers	17–29	Saracens
Try: Tait 28' c Penalty try 57'; Con: G. Ford (1/1) 29'; Pen: G. Ford (1/1) 34'	Report	Try: Penalty try 10'; George 25' c Con: Farrell (1/1) 25'; Pen: Farrell (4/4) 6', 47', 60', 69'; Drop: Farrell (1/1) 50'

Welford Road
Attendance: 24,873
Referee: Matthew Carley

=== Round 12 ===
29 December 2017
19:45

(2 BP) Bath	26–31	Wasps (1 BP)
Try: Priestland 33' c J.H. Wilson 39' c Grant 52' m Mercer 63' c Con: Priestland (3/4) 34', 40', 64'	Report	Try: M. Watson (2) 7' c, 22' m Robson 16' c de Jongh 41' c Lovobalavu 56' m Con: Cipriani (3/5) 8', 17', 42'

Recreation Ground
Attendance: 14,509
Referee: Luke Pearce

30 December 2017
15:00

Gloucester	20–16	Sale Sharks (1 BP)
Try: Halifonua 33' c Vellacott 47' c Con: Twelvetrees (2/2) 34', 47'; Pen: Twelvetrees (2/3) 63', 70'	Report	Try: MacGinty 50' c Con: MacGinty (1/1) 51'; Pen: MacGinty (3/3) 11', 18', 40'

Kingsholm
Attendance: 16,115
Referee: Andrew Jackson

30 December 2017
15:00

(1 BP) London Irish	15–20	Newcastle Falcons
Pen: Tonks (5/6) 3', 11', 28', 50', 76'	Report	Try: A. Tait (2) 22' m, 25' c Goneva 39' m Con: Flood (1/3) 26'; Pen: Flood (1/2) 7'

Madejski Stadium
Attendance: 10,019
Referee: Tom Foley

30 December 2017
15:00

(1 BP) Saracens	46–31	Worcester Warriors (1 BP)
Try: B. Spencer 14' c Maitland 26' c Wray (2) 56' c, 61' c Earle (2) 72' c, 76' m Con: Farrell (5/6) 16', 26', 57', 62', 73'; Pen: Farrell (2/3) 30', 51'	Report	Try: Adams 4' c S. Lewis 40' c Denton 64' c Shillcock 79' c Con: Pennell (4/4) 6', 40+1', 64', 80+1'; Pen: Pennell (1/3) 32'

Allianz Park
Attendance: 9,999
Referee: Christophe Ridley

30 December 2017
16:00

(1 BP) Harlequins	50–21	Northampton Saints
Try: Ward 10' c Walker 18' c Visser (2) 20' c, 42' m Care (2) 30' c, 56' c Luamanu 67' c Con: M. Smith (6/7) 11', 18', 21', 31', 57', 68'; Pen: M. Smith (1/1) 16'	Report	Try: Horne 47' c Groom 52' c Haywood 72' c Con: Myler (3/3) 47', 54', 73'

Twickenham
Attendance: 77,825
Referee: JP Doyle

31 December 2017
15:00

(1 BP) Exeter Chiefs	30–6	Leicester Tigers
Try: Armand 52' c Slade 63' c Hill 70' m Yeandle 80+1' m Con: Steenson (2/2) 53', 64; Pen: Slade (1/1) 23'; Steenson (1/1) 39'	Report	Pen: G. Ford (2/2) 35', 42'

Sandy Park
Attendance: 12,807
Referee: Craig Maxwell-Keys

=== Round 13 ===
5 January 2018
19:45

Worcester Warriors	25–46	Bath (1 BP)
Try: Denton 57' c Taufete'e 71' c Humphreys 78' m Con: Pennell (2/2) 57', 72'; Pen: Pennell (2/4) 27', 40'	Report	Try: Grant 33' c Garvey 43' c A. Watson 52' c J. Phillips 59' c Fotuali'i (2) 66' c, 76' m Con: Priestland (3/3) 34', 44', 53'; F. Burns (2/2) 60', 67'; Pen: Priestland (2/2) 7', 14'

Sixways
Attendance: 8,225
Referee: JP Doyle

6 January 2018
15:00

Leicester Tigers	19–15	London Irish (1 BP)
Try: To'omua 35' c May 41' c Tuilagi 71' c Con: G. Ford (2/3) 37', 72'	Report	Try: Cokanasiga 20' m Lewington 73' c Con: Tonks (1/2) 74'; Pen: Tonks (1/2) 56'

Welford Road
Attendance: 20,845
Referee: Karl Dickson

6 January 2018
15:00

Northampton Saints	22–19	Gloucester (1 BP)
Try: Pisi 10' m Groom 55' c Penalty try 14'; Con: Mallinder (1/2) 56'; Pen: Mallinder (1/1) 26'	Report	Try: Penalty try 14'; Hanson 30' c Afoa 52' m Con: O. Williams (1/2) 31'

Franklin’s Gardens
Attendance: 13,133
Referee: Ian Tempest

6 January 2018
15:00

Sale Sharks	30–29	Harlequins (2 BP)
Try: McGuigan 6' c Janse van Rensburg (2) 10' c, 67' c Con: MacGinty (2/2) 8', 11' de Klerk (1/1) 68'; Pen: MacGinty (2/2) 24', 61' de Klerk (1/1) 75'	Report	Try: Alofa 19' m Walker 28' c R. Chisholm 34' c Roberts 63' c Con: M. Smith (3/4) 29', 35', 64'; Pen: M. Smith (1/2) 38'

AJ Bell Stadium
Attendance: 7,242
Referee: Matthew Carley

7 January 2018
15:00

Newcastle Falcons	28–20	Exeter Chiefs
Try: Sinoti 22' m Goneva 25' c Cooper 38' c Con: Hodgson (2/2) 26', 39'; Pen: Flood (1/1) 2'; Hodgson (2/2) 30', 80'	Report	Try: S. Simmonds 44' m Woodburn 66' m Salmon 77' c Con: Steenson (1/3) 77'; Pen: Steenson (1/1) 10'

Kingston Park
Attendance: 7,174
Referee: Andrew Jackson

7 January 2018
15:00

Wasps	15–38	Saracens (1 BP)
Try: Penalty try 36' le Roux 38' m Pen: Cipriani (1/1) 19'	Report	Try: Wyles 8' m Goode (2) 13' m, 65' c Burger 30' m B. Spencer 78' c Con: Farrell (2/5) 66', 79'; Pen: Farrell (3/3) 22', 55', 75'

Ricoh Arena
Attendance: 17,677
Referee: Wayne Barnes

=== Round 14 ===
9 February 2018
19:45

Bath	32–9	Northampton Saints
Try: Banahan 40' c Auterac 67' m Batty 76' m Con: F. Burns (1/2) 40+1; Pen: F. Burns (5/5) 24', 30', 36', 50', 57'	Report	Pen: Francis (3/3) 5', 17', 53'

Recreation Ground
Attendance: 13,015
Referee: Tom Foley

10 February 2018
14:00

(1 BP) Exeter Chiefs	5–6	Worcester Warriors
Try: Lees 56' m	Report	Pen: Pennell (2/3) 20', 40'

Sandy Park
Attendance: 10,666
Referee: Andrew Jackson

10 February 2018
14:30

Gloucester	24–17	Leicester Tigers (1 BP)
Try: Trinder (2) 28' c, 34' c Scott 56' c Con: Twelvetrees (3/3) 29', 35', 57'; Pen: Twelvetrees (1/1) 47'	Report	Try: Malouf 11' c J. Ford 31' c Con: J. Ford (2/2) 12', 32'; Pen: To'omua (1/1) 80+1'

Kingsholm
Attendance: 13,179
Referee: JP Doyle

10 February 2018
14:30

Saracens	25–3	Newcastle Falcons
Try: Barrington 26' c Penalty try 30'; Malins 74' m Con: B. Spencer (1/1) 27'; Pen: B. Spencer (2/2) 8', 18'	Report	Pen: Hodgson (1/1) 10'

Allianz Park
Attendance: 8,194
Referee: Christophe Ridley

10 February 2018
15:00

(1 BP) London Irish	9–13	Sale Sharks
Pen: Bell (3/3) 34', 59', 71'	Report	Try: Strauss 29' c Con: de Klerk(1/1) 30'; Pen: de Klerk(2/2) 4', 62'

Madejski Stadium
Attendance: 4,457
Referee: Craig Maxwell-Keys

11 February 2018
13:00

Harlequins	22–44	Wasps (1 BP)
Try: Visser 24' c Morris 41' m Matthews 70' c Con: M. Smith (2/3) 25', 70'; Pen: M. Smith (1/1) 9'	Report	Try: de Jongh 4' c T. Young (2) 10' m, 49' c le Roux 51' c Cruse 63' c Bassett 75' m Con: Cipriani (4/6) 4', 49' 51, 64'; Pen: Cipriani (2/2) 28', 44'

Twickenham Stoop
Attendance: 13,400
Referee: Wayne Barnes

=== Round 15 ===
16 February 2018
19:45

(1 BP) Newcastle Falcons	29–12	Bath
Try: Sinoti 4' c Flood 14' c Cooper 35' c Goneva 50' m Con: Flood (3/4) 5', 15', 36'; Pen: Flood (1/1) 75'	Report	Try: Vuna 45' c Perenise 80+2' m Con: F. Burns (1/1) 46'

Kingston Park
Attendance: 7,062
Referee: Matthew Carley

16 February 2018
19:45

Sale Sharks	3–13	Saracens
Pen: de Klerk (1/1) 32'	Report	Try: L. Williams 12' c Con: B. Spencer (1/1) 13'; Pen: B. Spencer (2/3) 39', 50'

AJ Bell Stadium
Attendance: 6,662
Referee: Luke Pearce

17 February 2018
15:00

Leicester Tigers	33–18	Harlequins
Try: To'omua 58' c Kitchener 60' c Thompstone 80+2' c Con: To'omua (3/3) 59', 62', 80+4'; Pen: To'omua (4/5) 13', 16', 36', 76'	Report	Try: Alofa 2' m Wallace 47' m Matthews 69' m Pen: M. Smith (1/1) 31'

Welford Road
Attendance: 23,647
Referee: Wayne Barnes

17 February 2018
15:00

Northampton Saints	25–17	London Irish
Try: North 41' c Horne 44' m Haywood 48' c Con: Francis (2/3) 41', 50'; Pen: Francis (1/2) 27'; Drop: Francis (1/1) 71'	Report	Try: Lewington (2) 5' c, 24' c Con: Tonks (2/2) 6', 25'; Pen: Tonks (1/2) 55'

Franklin's Gardens
Attendance: 13,108
Referee: Ian Tempest

17 February 2018
15:00

Worcester Warriors	25–15	Gloucester
Try: Arr 4' c Shillcock 10' c Adams 18' m Con: Pennell (2/3) 4', 11'; Pen: Pennell (2/2) 39', 65'	Report	Try: Scott 14' c Trinder 48' m Con: B. Burns (1/1) 14'; Pen: Twelvetrees (1/1) 8'

Sixways
Attendance: 11,499
Referee: Thomas Foley

18 February 2018
15:00

Wasps	13–7	Exeter Chiefs (1 BP)
Try: M. Watson 12' c Con: Cipriani (1/1) 13'; Pen: Gopperth (2/2) 52', 77'	Report	Try: Cowan-Dickie 61' c Con: Steenson (1/1) 62'

Ricoh Arena
Attendance: 16,924
Referee: JP Doyle

=== Round 16 ===
24 February 2018
14:00

(1 BP) Exeter Chiefs	31–30	Northampton Saints (1 BP)
Try: Penalty try 16'; Hepburn 35' c Armand 70' c Waldrom 80' c Con: Steenson (1/1) 36'; J. Simmonds (2/2) 71', 80'; Pen: Steenson (1/1) 51'	Report	Try: Horne 12' c Foden 37' c Mallinder 42' c Con: Francis (3/3) 13', 38', 42'; Pen: Myler (1/1) 25'; Francis (2/2) 53', 58

Sandy Park
Attendance: 11,466
Referee: Christophe Ridley

24 February 2018
14:30

Bath	33–32	Sale Sharks (1 BP)
Try: Mercer (2) 34' c, 78' c Bayliss 46' c Con: J.W.R. Wilson (3/3) 35', 48', 79'; Pen: J.W.R. Wilson (4/4) 2', 4', 21', 55'	Report	Try: Solomona (2) 13' c, 69' m Yarde 17' m Con: de Klerk (1/3) 14'; Pen: de Klerk (5/5) 26', 40', 44', 52', 58'

Recreation Ground
Attendance: 13,843
Referee: Ian Tempest

24 February 2018
14:30

Gloucester	25–25	Wasps
Try: Hibbard 16' c Sharples 35' m Trinder 70' c Con: Twelvetrees (2/3) 18', 71'; Pen: Twelvetrees (2/3) 6', 24'	Report	Try: Robson 57' c T. Young 67' m Wade 80' c Con: Gopperth (2/3) 58', 80+1'; Pen: Gopperth (2/2) 27', 31'

Kingsholm
Attendance: 12,447
Referee: Karl Dickson

24 February 2018
14:30

Harlequins	10–28	Newcastle Falcons (1 BP)
Try: Horwill 7' c Con: M. Smith (1/1) 8'; Pen: M. Smith (1/2) 47'	Report	Try: Chick 32' c Cooper 50' c Harris 54' c Sinoti 65' c Con: Flood (3/3) 33', 51', 55'; Hodgson (1/1) 66'

Twickenham Stoop
Attendance: 13,700
Referee: Thomas Foley

25 February 2018
13:00

London Irish	22–9	Worcester Warriors
Try: van Zyl 26' c Con: Tonks (1/1) 27'; Pen: Tonks (5/7) 6', 18', 52', 76', 79'	Report	Pen: Pennell (3/3) 2', 36', 59'

Madejski Stadium
Attendance: 5,250
Referee: JP Doyle

25 February 2018
15:30

Saracens	20–28	Leicester Tigers (1 BP)
Try: Malins (2) 68' c, 79' c Con: Lozowski (2/2); Pen: B. Spencer (2/2)	Report	Try: M. Tuilagi 9' c Bateman 32' c Veainu 38' c J. Holmes 64' c Con: To'omua (4/4) 10', 33', 39', 65'

Allianz Park
Attendance: 9,772
Referee: Craig Maxwell-Keys

=== Round 17 ===
3 March 2018
15:00

(2 BP) Gloucester	20–21	Newcastle Falcons
Try: Woodward 13' m Halaifonua 47' m Atkinson 65' m Ludlow 75' m	Report	Try: Hogg 18' c M. Young 50' m Con: Hodgson (1/2) 19'; Pen: Hodgson (3/3) 3', 25', 40+2'

Kingsholm
Attendance: 8,340
Referee: Craig Maxwell-Keys

3 March 2018
15:00

Northampton Saints	25–34	Sale Sharks (1 BP)
Try: Paterson 42' c Horne 52' m Brüssow 69' c Con: Francis (2/3) 42', 70'; Pen: Francis (2/3) 19', 31'	Report	Try: Solomona (3) 4' c, 25' c, 34' c Yarde 37' c Con: de Klerk (4/4); Pen: de Klerk (2/3)

Franklin's Gardens
Attendance: 8,403
Referee: Wayne Barnes

4 March 2018
15:00

Exeter Chiefs	24–12	Saracens
Try: Dollman 35' m Penalty try 71'; Pen: J. Simmonds (4/4) 1', 10', 26', 63'	Report	Try: Earl 32' c Brits 40' m Con: B. Spencer (1/2) 33'

Sandy Park
Attendance: 12,727
Referee: Matthew Carley

4 March 2018
15:00

Harlequins	20–5	Bath
Try: Visser 23' c Sinckler 54' c Con: Catrakilis (2/2) 24', 55'; Pen: Catrakilis (1/2) 29'; M. Smith (1/1) 77'	Report	Try: Banahan 15' m

Twickenham Stoop
Attendance: 7,450
Referee: JP Doyle

4 March 2018
15:00

Wasps	24–16	London Irish
Try: Cruse (2) 10' c, 76' c Robson 48' c Con: Cipriani (3/3) 11', 49', 77'; Pen: Cipriani (1/1) 63'	Report	Try: Porecki 60' m du Plessis 74' m Pen: Bell (2/2) 55', 67'

Ricoh Arena
Attendance: 12,466
Referee: Thomas Foley

4 March 2018
15:00

Worcester Warriors	5–34	Leicester Tigers (1 BP)
Try: Fa'osiliva 22' m	Report	Try: J. Holmes 11' m Bateman 35' c Veainu 68' m, 79' c M. Tuilagi 77' c Con: To'omua (3/5) 36', 78', 80'; Pen: To'omua (1/1) 44'

Sixways
Attendance: 9,674
Referee: Luke Pearce

=== Round 18 ===
23 March 2018
19:45

(1 BP) Bath	18–20	Exeter Chiefs
Try: Banahan 53' m Grant 66' c Con: Priestland (1/1) 67'; Pen: F. Burns (2/2) 28', 38'	Report	Try: Hill 22'; S. Simmonds 48' c Con: J. Simmonds (2/2) 22', 49'; Pen: J. Simmonds (2/3) 6, 74'

Recreation Ground
Attendance: 14,509
Referee: Wayne Barnes

24 March 2018
15:00

(2 BP) London Irish	29–33	Gloucester (1 BP)
Try: McNally 9' c van Zyl 17' c Brophy-Clews 64' c Cokanasiga 71' m Con: Marshall (2/2) 10', 18'; Bell (1/2) 65'; Pen: Marshall (1/1) 4'	Report	Try: Hanson 26' c T. Marshall (2) 31' c, 55' c Ludlow 34' m Atkinson 52' c Con: Twelvetrees (2/2) 27', 32'; B. Burns (2/3) 53', 56'

Madejski Stadium
Attendance: 15,274
Referee: Matthew Carley

24 March 2018
15:00

(1 BP) Sale Sharks	58–25	Worcester Warriors
Try: B. Curry 1' c de Klerk 6' m Yarde 31' c Solomona 36' c Haley 44' c Strauss 51' m McGuigan 58' c O'Connor 75' c Con: MacGinty (5/7) 3', 32', 38', 45', 58' de Klerk (1/1) 76'; Pen: MacGinty (1/1) 14' de Klerk (1/1) 67'	Report	Try: Adams (2) 41'c, 61' c Willison 78' m Con: Shillcock (1/1) 43'; Olver (1/1) 62'; Pen: Shillcock (2/2) 17', 29'

AJ Bell Stadium
Attendance: 5,991
Referee: Andrew Jackson

24 March 2018
15:00

Saracens	24–11	Harlequins
Try: Li. Williams 8' c Itoje 30' m Con: Lozowski (1/2) 10'; Pen: Lozowski (4/4) 2', 40', 53', 77	Report	Try: Horwill 50' m Pen: Catrakilis (2/2) 23' 27'

London Stadium
Attendance: 55,329
Referee: Tom Foley

24 March 2018
17:30

Newcastle Falcons	25–22	Northampton Saints (1 BP)
Try: Goneva 20' c Con: Flood (1/1) 21'; Pen: Flood (6/8) 3', 13', 39', 42', 55', 66'	Report	Try: Ribbans 10' m Horne 34' c Tuitavake 51' c Con: Myler (2/3) 35', 52'; Pen: Myler (1/1) 62'

St James' Park
Attendance: 30,174
Referee: JP Doyle

25 March 2018
15:00

Leicester Tigers	16–15	Wasps (1 BP)
Try: Kalamafoni 2' c Con: G. Ford (1/1) 3'; Pen: G. Ford (3/4) 45', 69, 76'	Report	Try: Daly (2) 13' m, 23' c Con: Cipriani (1/1) 24'; Pen: Gopperth (1/1) 21'

Welford Road
Attendance: 25,849
Referee: Luke Pearce

=== Round 19 ===
6 April 2018
19:45

(1 BP) Sale Sharks	28–27	Wasps (1 BP)
Try: Webber 36' c McGuigan 39' m B. Evans 40+1' m Yarde 80+11' m Con: MacGinty (1/4) 37'; Pen: MacGinty (2/3) 24', 45'	Report	Try: Bassett (2) 10' c, 19' c Daly 49' c Con: Gopperth (3/3) 11', 20', 50'; Pen: Daly (1/1) 7'; Gopperth (1/1) 64'

AJ Bell Stadium
Attendance: 6,817
Referee: JP Doyle

7 April 2018
14:00

Bath	19–34	Leicester Tigers (1 BP)
Try: Dunn 32' c Con: Priestland (1/1) 33'; Pen: Priestland (4/5) 5', 16', 57' 65'	Report	Try: Thompstone 26' c Kalamafoni (2) 49' m, 62' m S. Harrison 72' c Veainu 77' c Con: G. Ford (3/5) 27', 73', 79'; Pen: G. Ford (1/2) 13'

Twickenham
Attendance: 60,880
Referee: Wayne Barnes

7 April 2018
14:00

Northampton Saints	13–63	Saracens (1 BP)
Try: R. Marshall 26'; Con: Myler (1/1) 27'; Pen: Myler (2/2) 15', 31'	Report	Try: Lozowski 9' c Brits 34' m B. Spencer 42' m M. Vunipola 49' c L. Williams 57' c Wyles 60' c Maitland 63' c Wray 68' c Earle 79' m Con: Farrell (6/9) 10', 50', 58', 62', 64', 69'; Pen: Farrell (2/2) 21', 55'

Franklin’s Gardens
Attendance: 13,673
Referee: Craig Maxwell-Keys

7 April 2018
15:00

Harlequins	5–35	London Irish (1 BP)
Try: Clifford 51' m	Report	Try: van Zyl (2) 13' c, 21' c Northcote-Green 29' m Fowlie 61' c Con: Bell (3/4) 14', 22', 62'; Pen: Bell (3/4) 40', 45', 68

Twickenham Stoop
Attendance: 12,053
Referee: Ian Tempest

7 April 2018
15:00

Worcester Warriors	27–13	Newcastle Falcons
Try: Denton (2) 63' c, 75' c Schonert 66' c Con: D. Jones (3/3) 63', 67', 76'; Pen: Pennell (2/5) 2', 37'	Report	Try: Goneva 39' c Con: Flood (1/1) 39'; Pen: Flood (2/2) 23', 27'

Sixways
Attendance: 7,891
Referee: Christophe Ridley

8 April 2018
15:00

(1 BP) Exeter Chiefs	46–10	Gloucester
Try: Hepburn 17' c S. Simmonds 21' m Woodburn 40' c Nowell (2) 57' c, 62' c Steenson 74' c Con: J Simmonds (5/6) 18', 40', 58', 63', 75'; Pen: J Simmonds (2/2) 35', 45'	Report	Try: Braley 41' c Con: Williams (1/1) 42'; Pen: Williams (1/1) 5'

Sandy Park
Attendance: 12,760
Referee: Thomas Foley

=== Round 20 ===
13 April 2018
19:45

(1 BP) Newcastle Falcons	35–30	Sale Sharks (1 BP)
Try: C. Green 8' m Graham 15' c Hammersley 19' m Lawson 26' m Vickers 77' c Con: Hodgson (2/5) 15', 79'; Pen: Hodgson (2/2) 5', 69'	Report	Try: B. Curry 31' c Yarde (2) 38' c, 58' c Con: MacGinty (3/3) 32' 39' 59'; Pen: MacGinty (3/3) 43' 53' 73'

Kingston Park
Attendance: 7,021
Referee: Craig Maxwell-Keys

14 April 2018
15:00

(1 BP) Gloucester	37–9	Harlequins
Try: Braley 6' c Woodward 70' c Polledri 73' c Ackermann 80' c Con: Twelvetrees (4/4) 7', 71', 74', 80+2'; Pen: Twelvetrees (3/3) 2', 25', 46'	Report	Pen: M. Smith (3/4) 4', 14', 40+1'

Kingsholm
Attendance: 13,892
Referee: Luke Pearce

14 April 2018
15:00

(1 BP) Leicester Tigers	21–27	Northampton Saints
Try: Veainu 19' c To'omua 28' m Con: G. Ford (1/2) 19'; Pen: G. Ford (3/3) 57', 63', 71'	Report	Try: Foden 8' c Reinach 31' c Tuala 43' c Con: Myler (3/3) 10', 33', 44'; Pen: Myler (2/2) 17', 68'

Welford Road
Attendance: 25,849
Referee: Matthew Carley

14 April 2018
15:00

(1 BP) Wasps	30–15	Worcester Warriors
Try: Wade (2) 9' m, 33' m Launchbury 30' c Bassett 66' c Con: Gopperth (1/3) 31'; Daly (1/1) 66'; Pen: Gopperth (2/2) 22', 39'	Report	Try: Hammond 78' m Adams 80' c Con: Shillcock (1/2) 80+1'; Pen: D. Jones (1/2) 25'

Ricoh Arena
Attendance: 16,374
Referee: Ian Tempest

15 April 2018
15:00

London Irish	5–45	Exeter Chiefs (1 BP)
Try: Cokanasiga 53' m	Report	Try: Moon 2' c S. Simmonds (3) 19' c, 30' c, 48' c Lees 60' c Yeandle 76' c Con: Steenson (6/6) 3', 20', 31', 48', 60', 77'; Pen: Steenson (1/1) 41'

Madejski Stadium
Attendance: 7,849
Referee: JP Doyle

15 April 2018
15:00

(1 BP) Saracens	41–6	Bath
Try: Brits 14' c L. Williams 20' m Wigglesworth 44' c Farrell 48' c Burger 71' m B. Spencer 77' c Con: Farrell (4/6) 16', 45', 49', 78'; Pen: Farrell (1/1) 40'	Report	Pen: Priestland (2/2) 25', 37'

Allianz Park
Attendance: 10,000
Referee: Karl Dickson

=== Round 21 ===
27 April 2018
19:45

(1 BP) Leicester Tigers	23–25	Newcastle Falcons
Try: May 5' c Fitzgerald 53' c Con: G. Ford (2/2) 6', 54'; Pen: G. Ford (3/3) 23', 30', 60'	Report	Try: Goneva (2) 1' c, 68' m Hogg 80' c Con: Hodgson (1/1) 2'; Takulua (1/1) 80+6'; Pen: Hodgson (1/1) 11'; J. Socino (1/1) 37'

Welford Road
Attendance: 23,828
Referee: Luke Pearce

28 April 2018
15:00

(1 BP) Exeter Chiefs	34–19	Sale Sharks
Try: White 21' c Turner 24' c Yeandle 45' c G. Holmes 77' c Con: J. Simmonds (3/3) 22', 26', 47'; Steenson (1/1) 78'; Pen: J. Simmonds (1/1) 4'; Steenson (1/1) 71'	Report	Try: McGuigan (2) 8' c, 66' m Ostrikov 34' c Con: MacGinty (2/3) 9', 35'

Sandy Park
Attendance: 12,754
Referee: Karl Dickson

28 April 2018
15:00

Gloucester	20–43	Bath (1 BP)
Try: Slater 28' c Woodward 50' c Con: Twelvetrees (2/2) 30', 52'; Pen: Twelvetrees (2/2) 21', 37'	Report	Try: Dunn 1' c Priestland 13' c Brew 25' c Homer 32' m Vuna 55' c J.W.R. Wilson 75' c Con: Priestland (4/5) 2', 14', 26', 57'; F. Burns (1/1) 76'; Pen: Priestland (1/1) 46'

Kingsholm
Attendance: 16,115
Referee: Wayne Barnes

28 April 2018
15:00

(1 BP) Worcester Warriors	44–13	Harlequins
Try: Heem 13' m Willison (2) 20' m, 78' c Barry 25' c Te'o 32' m Hougaard 45' m Shillcock 65' c Con: Dorian Jones (1/4) 26'; Shillcock (2/3) 66', 79'; Pen: D. Jones (1/1) 1'	Report	Try: Walker 16' c Con: M. Smith (1/1) 16'; Pen: M. Smith (2/2) 9', 30'

Sixways
Attendance: 10,582
Referee: Craig Maxwell-Keys

29 April 2018
15:00

London Irish	14–51	Saracens (1 BP)
Try: Cokanasiga 30' c J. Williams 40+1' c Con: Tonks (2/2) 31', 40+2'	Report	Try: Barritt 21' m Taylor 25' m Rhodes 49' c Bosch 55' c Barrington 71' c Goode 77' c Brits 80+1' c Con: Farrell (5/7) 51', 57', 72', 77', 80+3'; Pen: Farrell (2/2) 16', 36'

Madejski Stadium
Attendance: 7,628
Referee: Ian Tempest

- London Irish are relegated following Worcester Warriors win against Harlequins.

29 April 2018
15:00

(1 BP) Wasps	36–29	Northampton Saints (2 BP)
Try: Wade (2) 4' c, 44' c Daly 18' m de Jongh 54' m Con: Gopperth (2/4) 5', 45'; Pen: Gopperth (4/4) 16', 29', 32', 72'	Report	Try: T. Harrison 11' c Ratuniyarawa 25' c Mitchell 64' c Tuala 68' m Con: Myler (2/2) 12', 26'; Grayson (1/2) 65'; Pen: Myler (1/1) 40+1'

Ricoh Arena
Attendance: 23,274
Referee: Matthew Carley

=== Round 22 ===
5 May 2018
16:00

(1 BP) Bath	63–19	London Irish
Try: Faletau 2' c Vuna 9' c Banahan (3) 21' c, 50' c, 62' c J.W.R. Wilson (2) 30' c, 55' c Stooke 39' c Vaughan 70' c Con: Priestland (5/5) 3', 9', 23', 31', 40+1'; F. Burns (4/4) 52', 56', 63', 71'	Report	Try: McNally (2) 58' m, 80' c Loader 73' c Con: Tonks (1/2) 74'; Paice (1/1) 80+1'

Recreation Ground
Attendance: 14,509
Referee: Matthew Carley

5 May 2018
16:00

Harlequins	17–41	Exeter Chiefs (1 BP)
Try: M. Smith 3' c Brown 39' c Con: M. Smith (2/2) 3', 40'; Pen: M. Smith (1/1) 27'	Report	Try: Ewers 10' c Dennis (2) 20' m, 31' c J. Simmonds 34' m Hendrickson 71' c Hepburn 75' c Con: J. Simmonds (2/4) 11', 32'; Steenson (2/2) 72', 76'; Pen: Steenson (1/1) 68'

Twickenham Stoop
Attendance: 12,384
Referee: Christophe Ridley

5 May 2018
16:00

Newcastle Falcons	22–39	Wasps (1 BP)
Try: Matavesi 63' m Kibirige 68' c Olmstead 72' c Con: C. Willis (2/3) 69', 73'; Pen: Takalua (1/1) 10'	Report	Try: Cruse 17' c Daly 34' m Cipriani 40+1' c Bassett 42' m Gopperth 47' c le Roux 78' m Con: Cipriani (1/3) 18'; Daly (1/1) 40+2'; Gopperth (1/2) 47'; Pen: Gopperth (1/1) 76'

Kingston Park
Attendance: 10,100
Referee: Ian Tempest

5 May 2018
16:00

(1 BP) Northampton Saints	32–24	Worcester Warriors
Try: Eadie 23' c Tuitavake 45' c Foden 49' m Collins 56' c Con: Grayson (3/4) 23', 45', 57'; Pen: Grayson (1/1) 39'; Myler (1/1) 80'	Report	Try: Butler (2) 5' c, 10' c Te'o 41' c Con: D. Jones (3/3) 6', 11', 42'; Pen: D. Jones (1/1) 52'

Franklin’s Gardens
Attendance: 14,121
Referee: Luke Pearce

5 May 2018
16:00

Sale Sharks	13–35	Leicester Tigers (1 BP)
Try: Yarde 52' c Con: MacGinty (1/1) 54'; Pen: MacGinty (2/2) 15', 25'	Report	Try: Holmes (2) 9' c, 80' m G. Ford 41' c M. Williams 64' c Con: G. Ford (3/3) 10', 42', 65'; Pen: G. Ford (2/4) 47', 51'; Drop: G. Ford (1/1) 74'

AJ Bell Stadium
Attendance: 10,050
Referee: Wayne Barnes

5 May 2018
16:00

(1 BP) Saracens	62–12	Gloucester
Try: Maitland 10' c L. Williams 16' m Farrell 39' c Figallo 41' c Itoje 47' m Wyles 50' c Penalty try 70'; B. Spencer (2) 74' c, 80' c Con: Farrell (4/6) 11', 39', 41', 51'; B. Spencer (2/2) 75', 80+1'; Pen: Farrell (1/2) 29'	Report	Try: Seabrook 0' m Halaifonua 14' c Con: Twelvetrees (1/2) 15'

Allianz Park
Attendance: 10,000
Referee: Craig Maxwell-Keys

== Play-offs ==
As in previous seasons, the top four teams in the Premiership table, following the conclusion of the regular season, contest the play-off semi-finals in a 1st vs 4th and 2nd vs 3rd format, with the higher ranking team having home advantage. The two winners of the semi-finals then meet in the Premiership Final at Twickenham on 26 May 2018.

=== Bracket ===
Semi-finals
19 May 2018 – Allianz Park
Saracens	57
Wasps	33
19 May 2018 – Sandy Park
Exeter Chiefs	36
Newcastle Falcons	5

Final
26 May 2018 – Twickenham
Exeter Chiefs	10
Saracens	27

=== Semi-finals ===
19 May 2018
12:30

Saracens (2)	57–33	(3) Wasps
Try: Lozowski 2' c Koch 12' c Wyles 43' c Figallo 64' c Itoje 71' c Spencer 76' c Con: Farrell (6/6) 3', 13', 44', 65', 72', 77'; Pen: Farrell (5/5) 18', 22', 27', 56', 59'	Report	Try: Le Roux (2) 23' m, 61' c Cooper-Woolley 47' c Young 50' c Wade 73' c Con: Gopperth (2/3) 48', 51'; Cipriani (2/2) 62', 74'

Allianz Park, London
Attendance: 10,000
Referee: JP Doyle

Team details

FB	15	(England) Alex Goode	(substituted off) 61'
RW	14	(Scotland) Sean Maitland
OC	13	(England) Alex Lozowski
IC	12	(England) Brad Barritt (c)
LW	11	(United States) Chris Wyles
FH	10	(England) Owen Farrell	(substituted off) 75'
SH	9	(England) Richard Wigglesworth	(substituted off) 65'
N8	8	(England) Billy Vunipola	(substituted off) 41'
OF	7	(England) Jackson Wray
BF	6	(England) Nick Isiekwe
RL	5	(England) George Kruis	(substituted off) 71'
LL	4	(England) Maro Itoje
TP	3	(South Africa) Vincent Koch	(substituted off) 55'
HK	2	(England) Jamie George	(substituted off) 55'
LP	1	(England) Mako Vunipola	(substituted off) 71'
Substitutions:
HK	16	(South Africa) Schalk Brits	(substituted on) 55'
PR	17	(England) Richard Barrington	(substituted on) 71'
PR	18	(Argentina) Juan Figallo	(substituted on) 55'
LK	19	(Australia) Will Skelton	(substituted on) 71'
FL	20	(South Africa) Michael Rhodes	(substituted on) 41'
SH	21	(England) Ben Spencer	(substituted on) 65'
CE	22	(Argentina) Marcelo Bosch	(substituted on) 61'
WG	23	(England) Nathan Earle	(substituted on) 75'
Coach:
(Ireland) Mark McCall

FB	15	(South Africa) Willie le Roux
RW	14	(England) Christian Wade
OC	13	(South Africa) Juan de Jongh	(substituted off) 61'
IC	12	(New Zealand) Jimmy Gopperth	(substituted off) 55'
LW	11	(England) Elliot Daly
FH	10	(England) Danny Cipriani
SH	9	(England) Dan Robson	(substituted off) 65'
N8	8	(England) Nathan Hughes	(substituted off) 65'
OF	7	(Wales) Thomas Young
BF	6	(England) Jack Willis	(substituted off) 37'
RL	5	(England) Kearnan Myall
LL	4	(England) Joe Launchbury
TP	3	(England) Jake Cooper-Woolley	(substituted off) 62'
HK	2	(England) Tom Cruse	(substituted off) 70'
LP	1	(England) Ben Harris	26' to 36'		(substituted off) 67'
Substitutions:
HK	16	(England) TJ Harris	(substituted on) 70'
PR	17	(England) Matt Mullan	(substituted on) 26'	(substituted off) 36'	(substituted on) 67'
PR	18	(Ireland) Marty Moore	(substituted on) 62'
LK	19	(England) James Gaskell	(substituted on) 65'
FL	20	(England) Guy Thompson	(substituted on) 37'
SH	21	(England) Joe Simpson	(substituted on) 65'
CE	22	(England) Kyle Eastmond	(substituted on) 55'
WG	23	(England) Josh Bassett	(substituted on) 61'
Coach:
(Wales) Dai Young

19 May 2018
15:30

Exeter Chiefs (1)	36–5	(4) Newcastle Falcons
Try: White 39' c Woodburn 60' c Armand 80' c Con: J. Simmonds (2/2) 40', 61'; Steenson (1/1) 80'; Pen: J. Simmonds (5/5) 15', 25', 29', 47', 51'	Report	Try: Tait 57' m

Sandy Park, Exeter
Attendance: 12,772
Referee: Matthew Carley

Team details

FB	15	(Australia) Lachlan Turner
RW	14	(England) Jack Nowell
OC	13	(England) Henry Slade	(substituted off) 64'
IC	12	(England) Sam Hill
LW	11	(England) Olly Woodburn
FH	10	(England) Joe Simmonds	(substituted off) 67'
SH	9	(Australia) Nic White	(substituted off) 61'
N8	8	(England) Sam Simmonds	(substituted off) 64'
OF	7	(England) Don Armand (c)
BF	6	(England) Dave Ewers
RL	5	(England) Jonny Hill
LL	4	(Australia) Mitch Lees	(substituted off) 54'
TP	3	(Wales) Tomas Francis	(substituted off) 54'
HK	2	(England) Luke Cowan-Dickie	(substituted off) 61'
LP	1	(England) Alec Hepburn	(substituted off) 54'
Replacements:
HK	16	(England) Jack Yeandle	(substituted on) 61'
PR	17	(England) Ben Moon	(substituted on) 54'
PR	18	(Australia) Greg Holmes	(substituted on) 54'
LK	19	(Scotland) Sam Skinner	(substituted on) 54'
FL	20	(England) Thomas Waldrom	(substituted on) 64'
SH	21	(England) Stu Townsend	(substituted on) 61'
FH	22	(Ireland) Gareth Steenson	(substituted on) 67'
CE	23	(Ireland) Ian Whitten	(substituted on) 64'
Coach:
(England) Rob Baxter

FB	15	(England) Simon Hammersley		(substituted off) 54'
RW	14	(Fiji) Vereniki Goneva
OC	13	(Scotland) Chris Harris
IC	12	(Fiji) Josh Matavesi				(substituted off) 55'
LW	11	(Samoa) Sinoti Sinoti
FH	10	(England) Toby Flood		38' to 41'
SH	9	(England) Micky Young		(substituted off) 50'
N8	8	(Scotland) Ally Hogg		(substituted off) 50'
OF	7	(Scotland) Gary Graham
BF	6	(England) Mark Wilson
RL	5	(Canada) Evan Olmstead	(yellow card) 28'
LL	4	(England) Calum Green		(substituted off) 64'
TP	3	(England) Scott Wilson		(substituted off) 28'
HK	2	(South Africa) Kyle Cooper		28' to 35'		(substituted off) 50'
LP	1	(England) Sam Lockwood		(substituted off) 50'
Substitutions:
HK	16	(Argentina) Santiago Socino		(substituted on) 28'	(substituted off) 35'	(substituted on) 50'
PR	17	(England) Rob Vickers		(substituted on) 50'
PR	18	(England) David Wilson		(substituted on) 28'
LK	19	(England) Will Witty		(substituted on) 64'
FL	20	(Tonga) Nili Latu		(substituted on) 50'
SH	21	(Tonga) Sonatane Takulua		(substituted on) 50'
CE	22	(Argentina) Juan Pablo Socino		(substituted on) 38'	(substituted off) 41'	(substituted on) 55'
FB	23	(England) Alex Tait		(substituted on) 54'
Coach:
(England) Dean Richards

=== Final ===
26 May 2018
15:00

Exeter Chiefs (1)	10–27	(2) Saracens
Try: Steenson 63' c Con: Steenson (1/1); Pen: J. Simmonds (1/2) 6'	Report	Try: B. Vunipola 15' c Wyles (2) 19' m, 47' c Earle 79' m Con: Farrell (2/3); Pen: Spencer (1/1) 71'

Twickenham Stadium, London
Attendance: 75,128
Referee: Wayne Barnes

Exeter Chiefs
Saracens

Team details

FB	15	(Australia) Lachlan Turner
RW	14	(England) Jack Nowell
OC	13	(England) Henry Slade
IC	12	(England) Sam Hill	(substituted off) 48'
LW	11	(England) Olly Woodburn
FH	10	(England) Joe Simmonds	(substituted off) 48'
SH	9	(Australia) Nic White	(substituted off) 58'
N8	8	(England) Sam Simmonds			(substituted off) 65'
OF	7	(England) Don Armand (c)	30' to 38'
BF	6	(England) Dave Ewers
RL	5	(England) Jonny Hill
LL	4	(Australia) Mitch Lees	(substituted off) 50'
TP	3	(Wales) Tomas Francis	(substituted off) 48'
HK	2	(England) Luke Cowan-Dickie	(substituted off) 48'
LP	1	(England) Alec Hepburn	(substituted off) 48'
Replacements:
HK	16	(England) Jack Yeandle	(substituted on) 48'
PR	17	(England) Ben Moon	(substituted on) 48'
PR	18	(Australia) Greg Holmes	(substituted on) 48'
LK	19	(Scotland) Sam Skinner	(substituted on) 50'
FL	20	(England) Thomas Waldrom	(substituted on) 30'	(substituted off) 38'	(substituted on) 65'
SH	21	(England) Stu Townsend	(substituted on) 58'
FH	22	(Ireland) Gareth Steenson	(substituted on) 48'
CE	23	(Ireland) Ian Whitten	(substituted on) 48'
Coach:
(England) Rob Baxter

FB	15	(England) Alex Goode
RW	14	(Scotland) Sean Maitland
OC	13	(England) Alex Lozowski
IC	12	(England) Brad Barritt (c)		50' to 57'
LW	11	(United States) Chris Wyles			(substituted off) 61'	(substituted on) 70'	(substituted off) 74'
FH	10	(England) Owen Farrell				(substituted off) 66'
SH	9	(England) Richard Wigglesworth		(substituted off) 58'
N8	8	(England) Billy Vunipola		(substituted off) 58'
OF	7	(England) Jackson Wray
BF	6	(England) Nick Isiekwe		(substituted off) 66'
RL	5	(England) George Kruis
LL	4	(England) Maro Itoje
TP	3	(South Africa) Vincent Koch		(substituted off) 52'
HK	2	(England) Jamie George		(substituted off) 52'	(substituted on) 61'	(substituted off) 70'
LP	1	(England) Mako Vunipola		(substituted off) 74'
Substitutions:
HK	16	(South Africa) Schalk Brits	(yellow card) 60'	(substituted on) 52'
PR	17	(England) Richard Barrington		(substituted on) 74'
PR	18	(Argentina) Juan Figallo		(substituted on) 52'
LK	19	(Australia) Will Skelton		(substituted on) 66'
FL	20	(South Africa) Michael Rhodes		(substituted on) 58'
SH	21	(England) Ben Spencer		(substituted on) 58'
CE	22	(Argentina) Marcelo Bosch		(substituted on) 50'	(substituted off) 57'	(substituted on) 66'
WG	23	(England) Nathan Earle					(substituted on) 74'
Coach:
(Ireland) Mark McCall

Man of the Match:
(England) Mako Vunipola (Saracens)

Assistant referees:
Luke Pearce
Paul Dix
Television Match Official:
David Grashoff

== Leading scorers ==
Note: Flags indicate national union as has been defined under WR eligibility rules. Players may hold more than one non-WR nationality.

=== Most points ===
As of 4 June 2018

Rank	Player	Club	Points
1	(England) Owen Farrell	Saracens	217
2	(Ireland) Gareth Steenson	Exeter	170
3	(England) George Ford	Leicester	166
4	(England) Marcus Smith	Harlequins	165
5	(Wales) Rhys Priestland	Bath	149
6	(United States) AJ MacGinty	Sale	144
7	(New Zealand) Jimmy Gopperth	Wasps	139
8	(England) Billy Twelvetrees	Gloucester	124
9	(England) Tommy Bell	London Irish	117
10	(South Africa) Faf de Klerk	Sale	97

=== Most tries ===
As of 4 June 2018

Rank	Player	Club	Tries
1	(Wales) Josh Adams	Worcester	13
1	(Fiji) Vereniki Goneva	Newcastle	13
1	(England) Christian Wade	Wasps	13
4	(England) Sam Simmonds	Exeter	12
4	(Scotland) Byron McGuigan	Sale	12
4	(England) Marland Yarde	Harlequins/Sale	12
7	(England) Denny Solomona	Sale	11
7	(England) Josh Bassett	Wasps	11
7	(United States) Chris Wyles	Saracens	11
7	(England) Ben Spencer	Saracens	11

== Awards ==
=== Player of the Month ===
The following received Player of the Month awards during the 2017–18 season, as selected by a panel of media commentators, in addition to monthly public polls.

Month	Nationality	Player	Position	Club
September	England	Courtney Lawes	Lock	Northampton
October	England	Jonny May	Wing	Leicester
November	South Africa	Ruan Ackermann	Flanker	Gloucester
December	Wales	Josh Adams	Wing	Worcester
February	England	Jack Willis	Flanker	Wasps
March	England	Joe Simmonds	Fly-Half	Exeter
April	Fiji	Vereniki Goneva	Wing	Newcastle

=== End-of-season awards ===
The winners of the 2018 Premiership Rugby Awards were announced on 16 May 2018.

Player of the Season
Nationality	Nominee	Club	Winner
England	Don Armand	Exeter	(Fiji); Vereniki Goneva
England	Danny Cipriani	Gloucester	(Fiji); Vereniki Goneva
South Africa	Faf de Klerk	Sale	(Fiji); Vereniki Goneva
England	Jamie Gibson	Northampton	(Fiji); Vereniki Goneva
Fiji	Vereniki Goneva	Newcastle	(Fiji); Vereniki Goneva

Young Player of the Season
Nationality	Nominee	Club	Winner
South Africa	Ruan Ackermann	Gloucester	(England); Sam Simmonds
Wales	Josh Adams	Worcester	(England); Sam Simmonds
Italy	Jake Polledri	Gloucester	(England); Sam Simmonds
England	Sam Simmonds	Exeter	(England); Sam Simmonds
England	Jack Willis	Wasps	(England); Sam Simmonds

Director of Rugby of the Season
Nationality	Nominee	Club	Winner
England	Rob Baxter	Exeter	(England); Dean Richards
Ireland	Mark McCall	Saracens	(England); Dean Richards
England	Dean Richards	Newcastle	(England); Dean Richards
Wales	Dai Young	Wasps	(England); Dean Richards

Community Player of the Season
Nationality	Nominee	Club	Winner
England	Charlie Beckett	Gloucester	(England); Mark Lambert
England	Freddie Burns	Bath	(England); Mark Lambert
England	Joel Kpoku	Saracens	(England); Mark Lambert
England	Mark Lambert	Harlequins	(England); Mark Lambert
Tonga	Nili Latu	Newcastle	(England); Mark Lambert
England	Jacob Umaga	Wasps	(England); Mark Lambert

Forwards
No.	Nationality	Player	Position	Club
1	England	Ellis Genge	Prop	Leicester
2	England	Luke Cowan-Dickie	Hooker	Exeter
3	New Zealand	John Afoa	Prop	Gloucester
4	England	Calum Green	Lock	Newcastle
5	England	Ed Slater	Lock	Gloucester
6	England	Jamie Gibson	Flanker	Northampton
7	England	Don Armand	Flanker	Exeter
8	England	Sam Simmonds	Number 8	Exeter

Backs
No.	Nationality	Player	Position	Club
9	South Africa	Faf de Klerk	Scrum-Half	Sale
10	England	Danny Cipriani	Fly-Half	Wasps
11	Wales	Josh Adams	Wing	Worcester
12	Australia	Matt To'omua	Centre	Leicester
13	Australia	Rob Horne	Centre	Northampton
14	Fiji	Vereniki Goneva	Wing	Newcastle
15	South Africa	Willie le Roux	Full-Back	Wasps
