= Lozowski =

Lozowski is a surname. Notable people with the surname include:

- Alex Lozowski (born 1993), English rugby union player
- Rob Lozowski (born 1960), English rugby union player
