= Nick Malouf =

Australian rugby union player

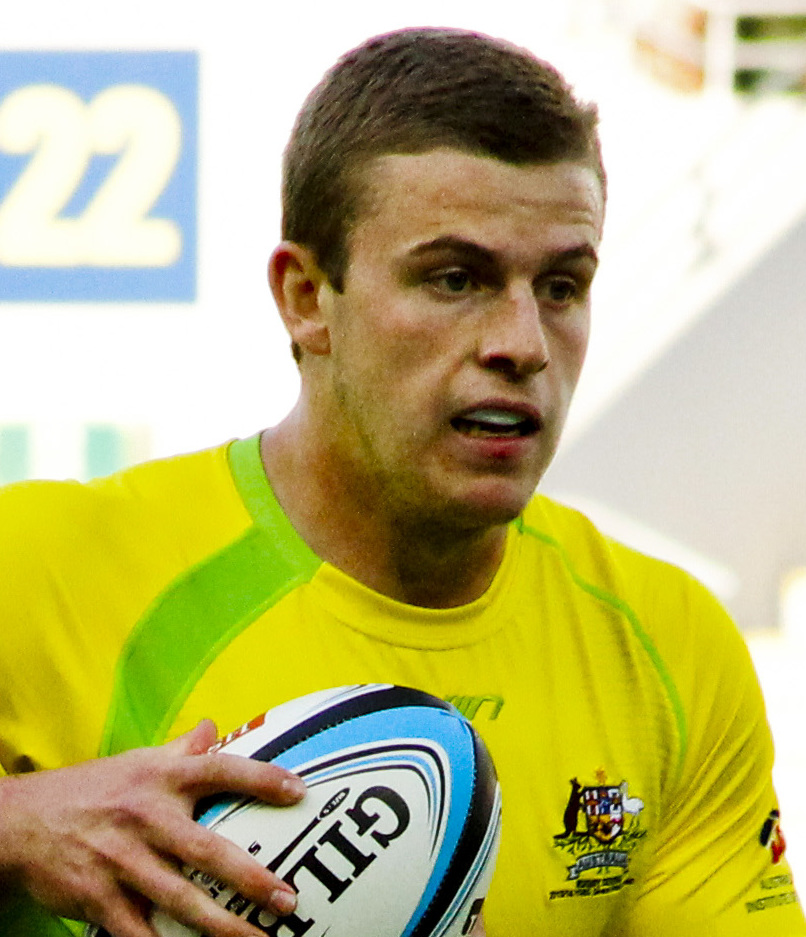
- Born: 19 March 1993 (age 33) Brisbane, Queensland, Australia
- Height: 1.90 m (6 ft 3 in)
- Weight: 95 kg (209 lb)
- School: Anglican Church Grammar School

Rugby union career
- Position: Wing
Senior career
Years	Team	Apps	(Points)
2017–2018	Leicester Tigers	21	(25)
2020	NSW Waratahs	2	(0)
- Correct as of 1 December 2023
National sevens team
Years	Team		Comps
2012–2024	Australia		59
- Correct as of 1 December 2023

Nick Malouf (born 19 March 1993) is an Australian professional rugby union player who plays as a back for the Australia national sevens team.

== International career ==
In his early career, he formally played for Premiership Rugby club Leicester Tigers for the 2017–18 season. He began playing the sport for the University of Queensland rugby club in the flanker position. Malouf later joined the Australian sevens team in 2012 after helping Australia's international development side the Aussie Thunderbolts to a win at the Noosa International Sevens Festival.

Malouf made his World Rugby Sevens Series debut in Dubai in 2012. In June 2017 is when he signed to play over in England for the Leicester Tigers. His form earned him a try of the week award against Gloucester in round three of the competition. Malouf later departed England to rejoin the Australian sevens program ahead of the 2018 Rugby World Cup Sevens. He represented Australia at the 2016 Olympic Games.

Malouf was a member of the Australian men's rugby seven's squad at the Tokyo 2020 Olympics. The team came third in their pool round and then lost to Fiji 19–0 in the quarterfinal. He competed for Australia at the 2022 Rugby World Cup Sevens in Cape Town.

In 2024, He was named in Australia's squad for the Summer Olympics in Paris.
