= Simon Hammersley =

English rugby union player (1993-)

- Full name: Simon Hammersley
- Born: 20 March 1993 (age 33) Hull, England
- Height: 1.88 m (6 ft 2 in)
- Weight: 93 kg (14 st 9 lb)
- University: Durham University

Rugby union career
- Position: Fullback
- Current team: Sale Sharks
Amateur team(s)
Years	Team	Apps	(Points)
- Hull Ionians
Senior career
Years	Team	Apps	(Points)
2013–2019	Newcastle Falcons	103	(45)
2019–2022	Sale Sharks	59	(55)
International career
Years	Team	Apps	(Points)
- England Saxons

Simon Hammersley (born 20 March 1993) is a former English rugby union player who played as a fullback. He has been nicknamed "Lord Hammer of Hammershire" by BT Sport commentator Nick Mullins.

== Club career ==
Hammersley started his career at his local amateur club Hull Ionians in National League 2 North, before attending Durham University where he was part of the team who won the BUCS national final at Twickenham.

Hammersley signed with Newcastle Falcons in summer 2013 and quickly established himself as a first team player, aided by injury to the regular starting full back Alex Tait. He was called into the England Saxons squad as injury cover in August 2016

Following Newcastle's relegation to the RFU Championship, Hammersley invoked a relegation release clause in his contract that would allow him to leave the club should such a situation occur. It was announced shortly afterwards that Sale Sharks had signed a three-year deal with the fullback, a move which would keep him in the Premiership.

In May 2022, Hammersley announced his retirement from professional rugby in order to a pursue a career outside the sport.
