= Josh Bassett =

English rugby union player

- Born: Josh Marcus Andrew Bassett; 17 March 1992 (age 34) Luton, England
- Height: 1.92 m (6 ft 3 1/2 in)
- Weight: 101 kg (15 st 13 lb)
- School: Harlington Upper School

Rugby union career
- Position: Wing
- Current team: Worcester Warriors
Youth career
- –2010: Ampthill
Senior career
Years	Team	Apps	(Points)
2011–2013	Bedford Blues	45	(90)
2013–2022	Wasps	179	(315)
2022–2023	Harlequins	16	(35)
2023–2025	Leicester Tigers	26	(55)
2025–	Worcester Warriors	6	(20)
- Correct as of 15 June 2025
International career
Years	Team	Apps	(Points)
2012	England U20	5	(15)
- Correct as of 17 October 2022

Josh Marcus Andrew Bassett (born 17 March 1992) is an English professional rugby union player for Worcester Warriors in the RFU Championship. His regular position is Wing. He has previously played for Bedford Blues in the RFU Championship and for Wasps, Harlequins and Leicester Tigers in Premiership Rugby.

== Club career ==
Bassett played youth team rugby for Ampthill RUFC, where he helped the under-17s win the National Bowl with a try in the final—the team lost only one game all season.

Bassett played for Bedford Blues in the RFU Championship. After being promoted from the academy in 2010, Bassett soon became a regular starter. He was linked with a host of Premiership teams after becoming a prolific try scorer for the Blues.

On 3 April 2013, it was announced that Bassett had signed for Wasps for the 2013/14 season. He would join fellow England U20s such as Tommy Bell, Nathan Morris and Alec Hepburn with whom he played at the 2012 junior World Cup.

Wasps entered administration on 17 October 2022 and Bassett was made redundant along with all other players and coaching staff. Shortly after it was announced that he would join Premiership rivals Harlequins until the end of the season.

On 25 January 2023, Bassett would sign for Premiership rivals Leicester Tigers from the 2023–24 season. Bassett scored a hat-trick of tries on 11 January 2025 as Tigers beat Ulster to qualify for the round-of-sixteen in the Champions Cup.

On 15 May 2025, Bassett would leave Leicester to join revamped Worcester Warriors in the Champ Rugby from the 2025–26 season.

== International career ==
Bassett has made multiple appearances for the England Under 20s side, including a trip to South Africa for the 2012 IRB Junior World Rugby Championship.

In June 2021, Bassett was called up the England Senior Men's training squad for the summer series
