= Chris Bell (rugby union) =

English rugby union footballer (born 1983)

- Born: Christopher Bell; 7 January 1983 (age 43) Plymouth, Devon, England
- Height: 1.88 m (6 ft 2 in)
- Weight: 100 kg (15 st 10 lb)
- School: Ivybridge Community College
- Notable relative: Tommy Bell (brother)

Rugby union career
- Position: Centre
Youth career
- -: Ivybridge
- –: Plymouth Albion
- –: Torquay Athletic
Senior career
Years	Team	Apps	(Points)
2001–2004	Harlequins	49	(40)
2004–2006	Leeds Tykes		
2006–2010	Sale Sharks	92	(120)
2010–2015	Wasps		
International career
Years	Team	Apps	(Points)
2001	England U19		
2003–2004	England U21		
- Correct as of 5 July 2014

Chris Bell (born 7 January 1983) is a retired rugby union footballer who played centre with Leeds, Harlequins, Sale Sharks and Wasps. During his time at Leeds he helped them win the 2004–05 Powergen Cup, in the final of which Bell scored a try. He is the older brother of London Irish player Tommy Bell. He retired in 2015 after a shoulder injury.

== Honours ==
- Powergen Cup/Anglo-Welsh Cup titles: 1
  - 2005
