= Elliott Stooke =

English rugby union player

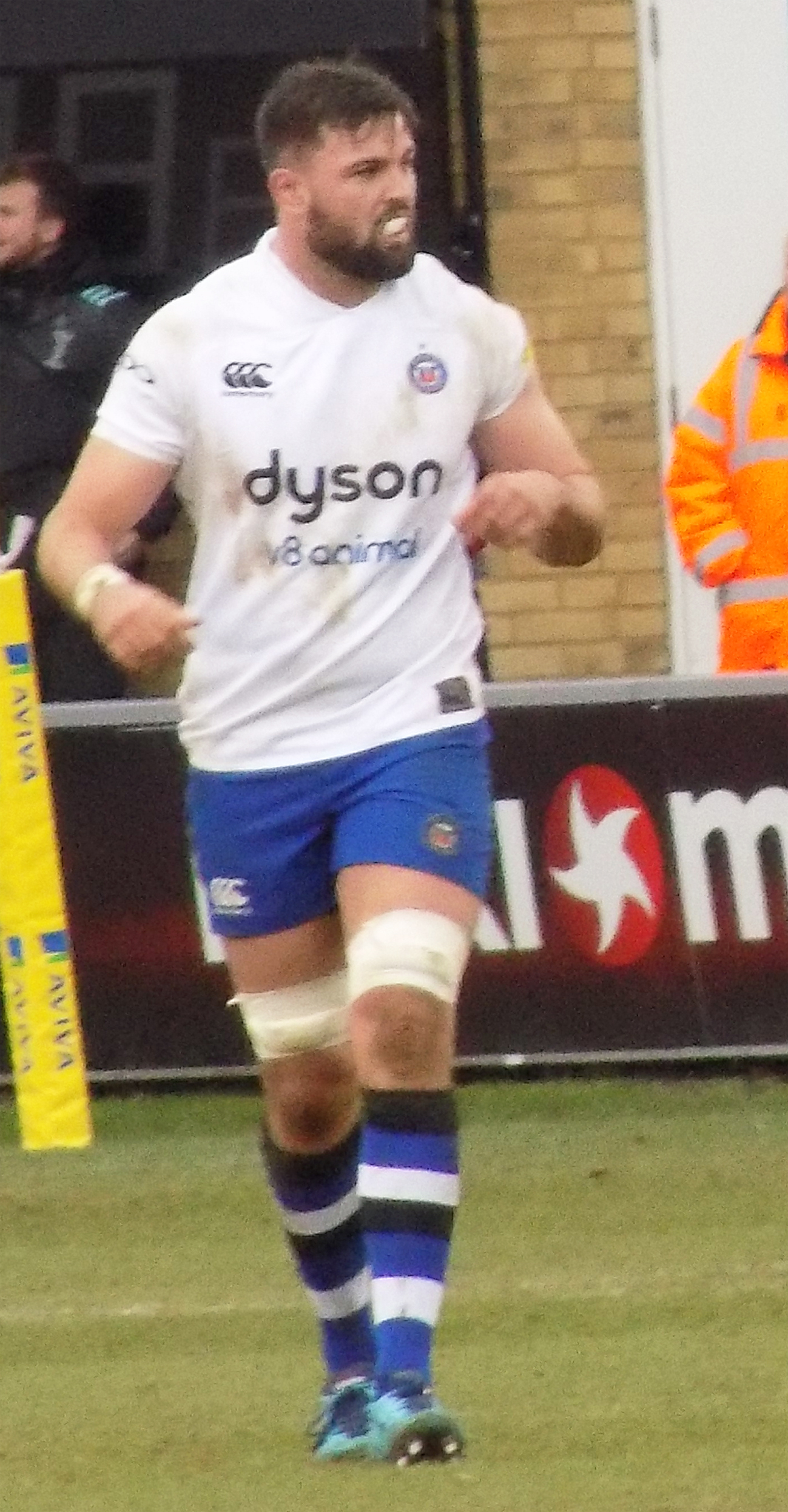
- Stooke playing for Bath, 2018
- Born: 10 September 1993 (age 33) Worcester, England
- Height: 1.98 m (6 ft 6 in)
- Weight: 114 kg (17 st 13 lb; 251 lb)

Rugby union career
- Position: Lock
- Current team: Leicester Tigers
Senior career
Years	Team	Apps	(Points)
2014–2016	Gloucester	65	(5)
2016	→ London Irish	7	(0)
2016–2021	Bath	127	(65)
2021–2022	Wasps	27	(15)
2022	Bristol	3	(0)
2022–2023	Montpellier	17	(5)
2023–2024	Bath	14	(10)
2024–2026	Red Hurricanes Osaka	22	(20)
2026–	Leicester Tigers	3	(5)
- Correct as of 16 November 2026
International career
Years	Team	Apps	(Points)
2012–2013	England U20		
2014	England Saxons		

Elliott Stooke (born 10 September 1993) is an English professional rugby union player for Premiership Rugby side Leicester Tigers. His playing position is Lock.

== Professional career ==
Stooke was called up to the England Saxons squad on 20 January 2014 as injury cover for Graham Kitchener.

On 19 January 2016, it was announced Stooke would leave Gloucester for local rivals Bath Rugby from the 2016-17 Aviva Premiership season. On 9 February 2016. Stooke was signed by London Irish on loan for the remainder of the 2015–16 season, he returned to Gloucester for a few weeks in March/April before returning to Irish for the remainder of the season.

After a slow start at Bath, Stooke cemented himself as a reliable figure in the second row of the Bath scrum during the 2016/17 Aviva Premiership Rugby Season. Making 30 starts in all competitions.

Stooke had his first taste of leadership, calling the line-outs on 16 February 2018 as Bath took on Newcastle Falcons at Kingston Park. Absent (on England duty) teammate, Charlie Ewels, ordinarily took the role.

Stooke was the only player in the Bath squad to play in all 22 games, during the 2017-18 Premiership Rugby season.

In March 2019 Stooke was called up as cover to England's Six Nations squad.

On 10 May 2021, Stooke would leave Bath to join Premiership rivals Wasps from the 2021–22 season.

On 20 May 2022, Stooke experienced a fibula fracture causing him to leave the pitch and to miss the rest of the season l

Wasps entered administration on 17 October 2022 and Stooke was made redundant along with all other players and coaching staff.

Stooke joined Bristol Bears on a short term injury cover deal at the end of 2022, before joining French side, Montpellier, during the 2022/23 Top 14 season.

In November 2023, Stooke re-joined Bath until the end of the 2023-24 Premiership Rugby season. On 11 July 2024, it was confirmed that Stooke has joined Japanese side Red Hurricanes Osaka in the Top League for the 2024-25 season.
