= Kyle Cooper (rugby union) =

South African rugby union player

- Full name: Kyle Lorran Cooper
- Born: 10 February 1989 (age 37) Johannesburg, South Africa
- Height: 1.78 m (5 ft 10 in)
- Weight: 115 kg (18 st 2 lb; 254 lb)
- School: Glenwood High

Rugby union career
- Position: Loosehead Prop
- Current team: Newcastle Falcons
Youth career
- 2005–2010: Sharks
Senior career
Years	Team	Apps	(Points)
2010–2015	Sharks XV	28	(10)
2010	Sharks Invitational XV	1	(5)
2010–2015	Sharks (Currie Cup)	52	(10)
2012–2016	Sharks	48	(15)
2016–present	Newcastle Falcons	61	(45)
2019–2020	→ Exeter Chiefs	1	(0)
- Correct as of 30 April 2018
International career
Years	Team	Apps	(Points)
2009	South Africa Under-20	5	(0)
- Correct as of 8 May 2015

Kyle Lorran Cooper (born 10 February 1989) is a South African rugby union player who represented the Newcastle Falcons in the English Premiership. Originally a hooker, he switched to prop ahead of 2020–21 season.

== Rugby career ==
He joined English Premiership side Newcastle Falcons prior to the 2016–17 season.

Cooper made a slow start for the Falcons in his first season, only playing seven times. But an outstanding 2017–18 campaign saw Cooper elected as part of the Premiership Dream Team. Making more turnovers and beating more defenders than any other Hooker in the league, as he scored four tries in his 16 Premiership outings that year.

He left Newcastle Falcons in 2022.
