= Sam Skinner (rugby union) =

Scotland international rugby union player

- Full name: Samuel George Skinner
- Born: 31 January 1995 (age 31) Exeter, England
- Height: 1.96 m (6 ft 5 in)
- Weight: 116 kg (256 lb; 18 st 4 lb)
- School: Torquay Boys' Grammar School
- University: University of Exeter

Rugby union career
- Position(s): Lock, Flanker
- Current team: Edinburgh Rugby
Senior career
Years	Team	Apps	(Points)
2014–2022	Exeter Chiefs	106	(65)
2022–	Edinburgh Rugby	24	(15)
- Correct as of 29 May 2024
International career
Years	Team	Apps	(Points)
2015	England U20	9	(10)
2018–	Scotland	35	(5)
- Correct as of 16 March 2024

Samuel George Skinner (born 31 January 1995) is a professional rugby union player who plays as a lock for United Rugby Championship club Edinburgh. Born in England, he represents Scotland at international level after qualifying on ancestry grounds.

== Early life ==
Skinner's father comes from Ayr.

Skinner studied at the University of Exeter, achieving a first in business and economics, and captaining the University side to the 2016 BUCS Championship.

== Club career ==
After a late growth spurt, Skinner started his career with Taunton Titans. He played ten matches in National League Two South during the 2014-15 season.

He was then offered an academy deal by Exeter Chiefs, which he juggled with studying for his degree. This was later upgraded to a three year pro deal. “I trained and played for Exeter Chiefs alongside the university team [captaining Exeter to the BUCS Championship in 2016] and studied full-time,” explained Skinner. “They [the Chiefs] were brilliant. If I needed a week off for exams they were excellent at giving me that time. I was a late developer, I signed for Exeter at 90kg so for a year they allowed me to develop, to put on another 5-10kg and get my size up to Premiership and international level.”

On 14 November 2014, Skinner made his first-team debut in the LV Cup against Gloucester Rugby before making his Premiership debut against Northampton Saints. He scored his first top try for the Chiefs in a 36-14 home win over Newcastle Falcons in February 2017 before starting his first game against Wasps RFC in September 2017. His debut was called the ‘performance of the weekend’ in The Daily Telegraph. In May 2018, Skinner was a second-half replacement for Mitch Lees as Exeter lost to Saracens in the Premiership Grand Final at Twickenham Stadium. He was described as one of Exeter's ‘standout players this season’.

Skinner won two Premierships with Exeter, and the Champions Cup in the double-winning year of 2020, before switching to Edinburgh Rugby in 2022.

== International career ==
While with Taunton he was picked up by the Scottish Exiles programme.

In June 2015, Skinner scored a try for the England Under-20 team against Wales in the pool stage of the 2015 World Rugby Under 20 Championship. Skinner came off the bench for the last five minutes in the final as England finished runners up to New Zealand.

Qualifying through this father, in October 2018 Skinner was called up to the senior Scotland squad for the Autumn Internationals. On 10 November 2018 he was given his Scotland international debut, starting at lock against Fiji at Murrayfield Stadium. Skinner received the Man of the Match award; making 7 tackles and 44 metres in the game.

A hamstring injury prevented Skinner contending for a world cup place. In 2023 Skinner was selected in Scotland's 33 player squad for the 2023 Rugby World Cup in France.
