= Harry Mallinder =

England international rugby union player

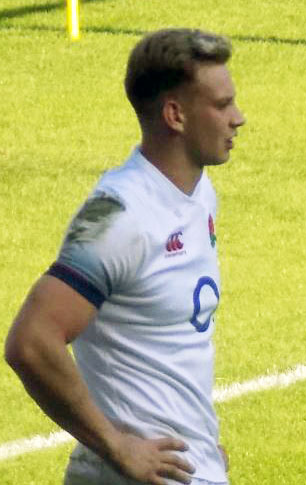
- Mallinder in 2018
- Born: Harry Mallinder; 13 June 1996 (age 30) Sale, England
- Height: 1.95 m (6 ft 5 in)
- Weight: 108 kg (17 st 0 lb)
- School: Rugby School
- Notable relative: Jim Mallinder (father)

Rugby union career
- Position(s): Fly-half, Inside Centre, Fullback
Senior career
Years	Team	Apps	(Points)
2013–2021	Northampton Saints	82	(236)
2022	Black Rams Tokyo	0	
- Correct as of 8 April’s 2022
International career
Years	Team	Apps	(Points)
2014	England U18s	4	(46)
2016	England U20s	5	(108)
2017	England		
- Correct as of 6 June 2017

Harry Mallinder (born 13 June 1996) is an English professional rugby union player for Black Rams Tokyo in Japan Rugby League One.

== Early life ==
Born in Sale, Greater Manchester, Mallinder resided there until 11, attending both Tyntesfield and Brooklands primary schools. He played rugby for Ashton on Mersey RFC before he moved to Northampton due to his father's work commitments as director of rugby for Northampton Saints. During this time he attended prep school Spratton Hall School. Next he attended Rugby School where he captained the XV, became their record points scorer and claimed player of the season two years in a row. He joined the Northampton academy at the age of 15 and captained their Under 18 side to the league title in the 2013/14 season whilst representing England at age group level. Mallinder later captained the England Under 18's to victory in Poland in the European Championships.

== Professional career ==
Mallinder made his professional debut for Northampton against Bedford Blues on Friday 16 August 2013, as a substitute, in the 56th minute and scored a conversion in the 75th. He made his sevens debut in the World Club Sevens at Twickenham and went on to start for Northampton Saints in the Elite Insurance Premiership Sevens Series on Friday 1 August 2014, scoring two tries and seven conversions in three matches. On 17 January 2016, at 19 years old, Mallinder made his European debut, replacing the injured Tom Collins in the 25th minute.

As a centre he broke into the Saints' senior side and kicked a penalty in the last play of the game to seal the Midlands side's Aviva Premiership win over Exeter Chiefs on Friday 30 September 2016.

As a first team regularly at fly-half or inside centre, Mallinder showed maturity and calm as he took important kicks during the Saints' season, including the winning conversion in Saints' European Rugby Champions Cup play-off final against Stade Français Paris to secure European Champions Cup rugby for the 2017/18 season.

In July 2021, it was confirmed that Mallinder had left Northampton to pursue a playing opportunity in Japan. Northampton have the option for him to return ahead of the 2023–24 season.

== International career ==
Mallinder made his England U18 debut at centre and contributed two penalty goals and a conversion to the 28–6 win over Scotland in March 2014. Mallinder then led England U18 to a 62–5 win over Portugal in the FIRA/AER Championship in April but also scored his maiden try at that level and contributed 30 points in all to his side's three victories in the tournament that brought the European crown.

In May 2016, Mallinder was named in the England U20s and went on to captain the side through the pool stages and to the final of the World Rugby Under 20 Championship in Manchester, where England were crowned Champions after Mallinder scored 23 points.

On 20 April 2017, Mallinder was one of 15 uncapped players named in the senior England tour party to Argentina in June for a 2-test series.

== American Football ==
On 18 January 2024, Mallinder was one of 16 athletes named in the National Football League's International Player Pathway Program. He was registered as a kicker or punter.
