= Mark Jennings (rugby union) =

Namibian rugby union player

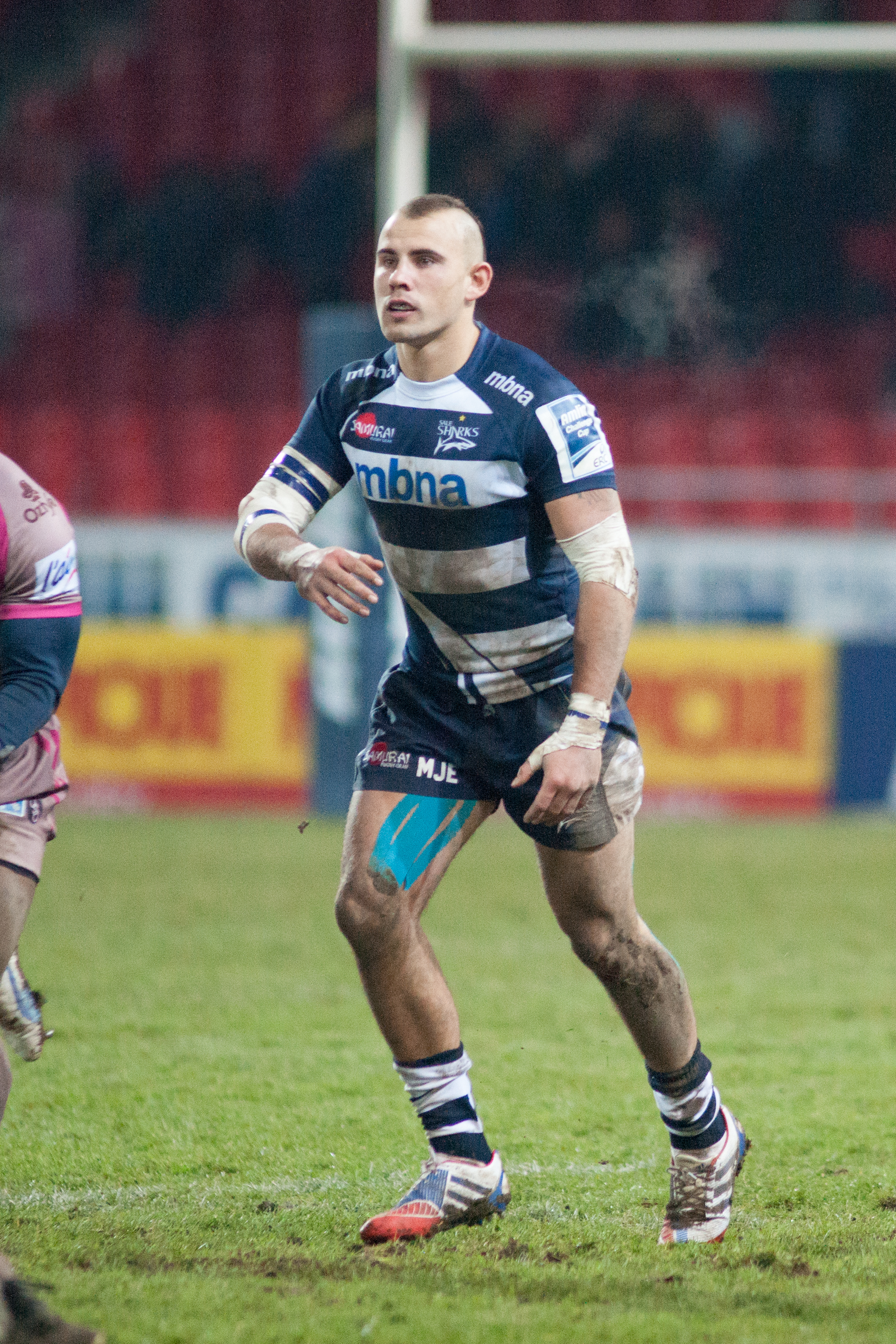
- Jennings playing for Sale Sharks in 2013
- Born: Mark Jennings; 27 February 1993 (age 33) Walvis Bay, Namibia
- Height: 1.83 m (6 ft 0 in)
- Weight: 97 kg (15 st 4 lb)
- School: Lymm High School

Rugby union career
- Position(s): Centre; Winger (rugby union)
- Current team: Sale Sharks
Senior career
Years	Team	Apps	(Points)
2012–	Sale Sharks	74	(30)
2012	→ Sedgley Park (loan)	5	(10)
- Correct as of 6 June 2017
International career
Years	Team	Apps	(Points)
- England U16
- England U18
2013	England U20	4	(0)
- Correct as of 13 August 2016

Mark Jennings (born 27 February 1993 in Namibia) is an English rugby union player, most recently playing with the Sale Sharks. He usually plays as a centre but can also play as a winger. He is the youngest player to have ever signed a professional contract for Sale Sharks, joining on his 16th birthday. As of 5 February 2019, Mark Jennings and Sale Sharks agreed a mutual sabbatical away from Rugby Union. ^{3]}
