= Paul Grant (rugby union) =

New Zealand rugby union player

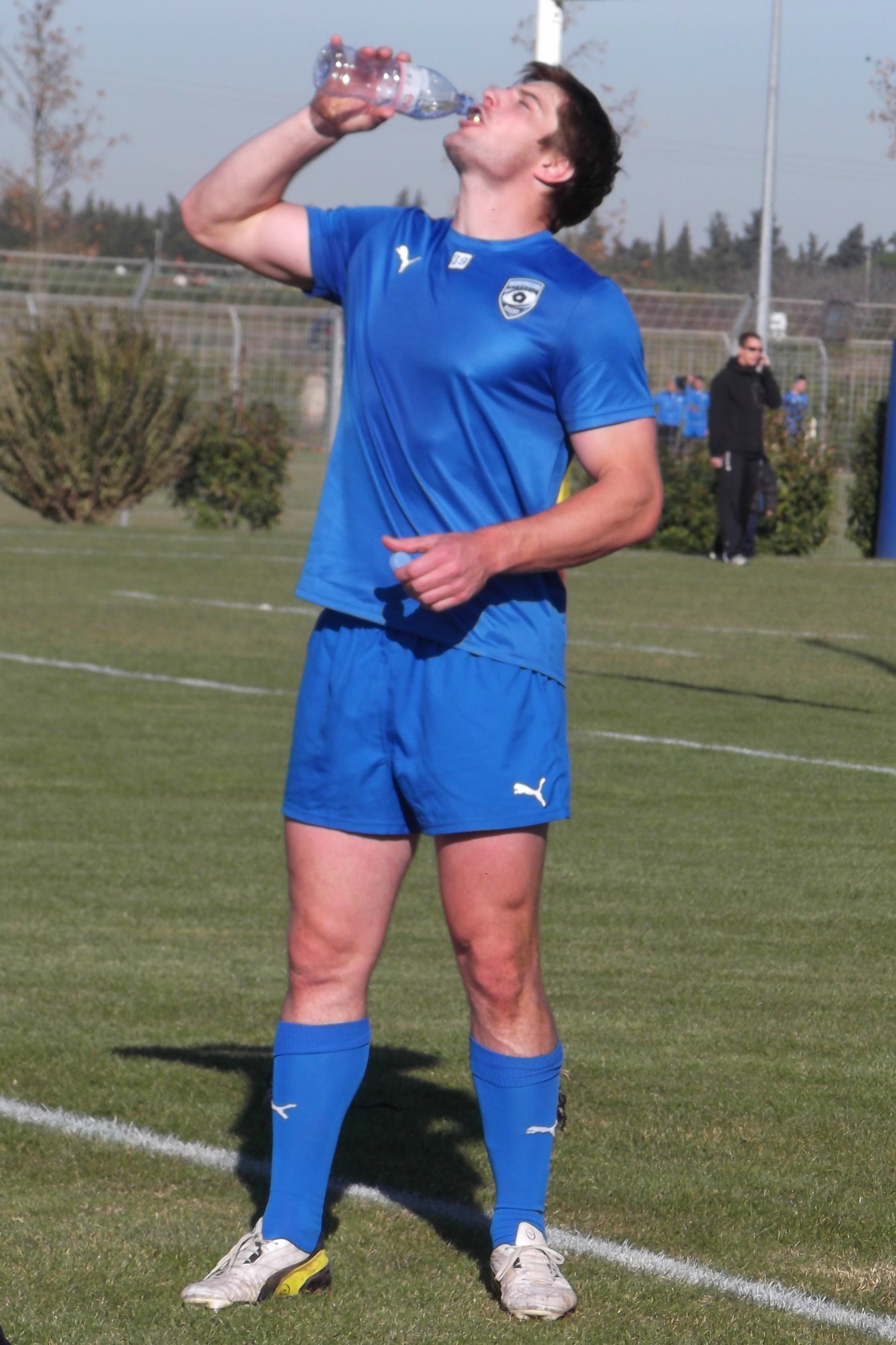
- Born: 27 October 1987 (age 39) Balclutha, New Zealand
- Height: 1.93 m (6 ft 4 in)
- Weight: 108 kg (238 lb)

Rugby union career
- Position: Number 8
Senior career
Years	Team	Apps	(Points)
2013-2014	Montpellier	9	(0)
2014−2016	Nottingham	44	(95)
2016-2019	Bath	0	(0)
2019–	Ealing Trailfinders	0	(0)
- Correct as of 11 August 2016
Provincial / State sides
Years	Team	Apps	(Points)
2007–13, 16	Otago	65	(25)
- Correct as of 28 October 2016
National sevens team
Years	Team		Comps
2008–2009	New Zealand		9 (0)
- Correct as of 27 May 2009

Paul Grant (born 27 October 1987 in Balclutha, New Zealand) is a New Zealand rugby union player. He played in the number 8 (and occasionally lock) position for the provincial based ITM Cup side Otago, and was the captain for the side during 2012 and 2013. He was captain when Otago lifted the Ranfurly Shield for the first time in 57 years. He has also represented New Zealand in sevens rugby since 2008.

In October 2013, it was announced Paul Grant would leave Otago in November 2013 to join French club Montpellier. In April 2014, it was announced that Grant had signed with Nottingham for the 2014–15 season.

Grant returned to England to sign Bath in the Premiership Rugby competition from the 2016–17 season. On 10 April 2019, Grant would leave Bath to return to the RFU Championship with Ealing Trailfinders from the 2019–20 season.

As of 2023, Grant is playing and coaching back in Dunedin for Kaikorai Rugby Football Club.
