= Rob Lozowski =

England international rugby union player

Robert Angelo Peter Lozowski (born 18 November 1960) is an English former rugby union player. He played for Wasps, and was capped by England in 1984 against Australia. He played 263 1st XV games for Wasps and was club captain in the 1988/89 season. He also played for the Barbarians whom he captained against Swansea in 1990. He also represented England at Under 23 and 'A' level between 1984 and 1990. His son Alex is currently a professional rugby player at Saracens.
