= Will Vaughan =

English rugby union player

- Born: Will Vaughan; 4 June 1998 (age 28) Marmaris, Turkey
- Height: 1.86 m (6 ft 1 in)
- Weight: 117 kg (18 st 6 lb)

Rugby union career
- Position: Loosehead Prop
Youth career
- 2018–2019: Bath
Senior career
Years	Team	Apps	(Points)
2019–2022	Bath	17	(5)

Will Vaughan is an English professional rugby union player currently unattached who most recently played as a loosehead prop for Premiership Rugby club Bath.

== Club career ==
On 25 January 2019 it was announced that Vaughan would be promoted from the Bath academy squad to the senior squad for the 2019–20 Premiership Rugby season.
