= Charlie Walker (rugby union) =

English rugby union player

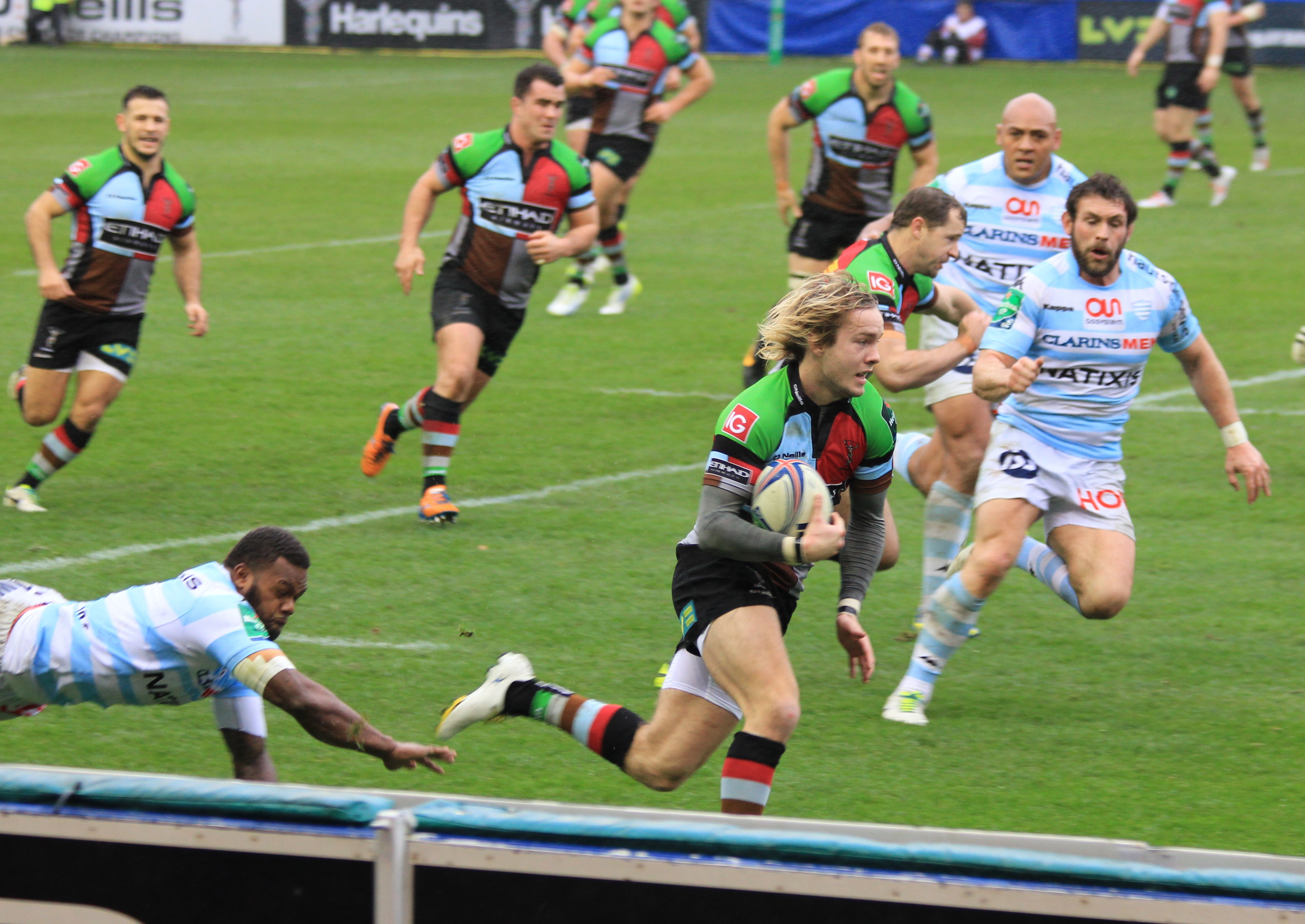
- Born: 23 December 1992 (age 33) Leicester, England
- Height: 180 cm (5 ft 11 in)
- Weight: 85 kg (187 lb; 13 st 5 lb)

Rugby union career
- Position: Winger/Centre
Senior career
Years	Team	Apps	(Points)
2011–2019	Harlequins	95	(217)
2011–2012	→Esher	17	(20)
2013	→Ealing Trailfinders		(0)
2019−2020	Zebre	12	(25)
2020–	Ealing Trailfinders		
- Correct as of 5 november 2018
International career
Years	Team	Apps	(Points)
2012	England U20	9	(15)
2012	England 7s	8	(0)
- Correct as of 15 December 2017

Charlie Walker (born 23 December 1992) is an English rugby union winger who plays for the RFU Championship side Ealing Trailfinders.

== Early life ==
Walker attended Stoneygate School then Oakham School where he played at Fly Half and captained the 1st XV which reached the final of the NatWest Schools Cup in 2011 and ultimately lost to Whitgift School 45–24. Walker played alongside current Scottish flanker Hamish Watson. Walker also played for the England U20 side.

== Professional Playing Career ==
Walker moved from the Leicester Tigers to Harlequin F.C. in 2011 after finishing his A-levels because he had grown unhappy with the Leicester Academy after they had wanted him to leave Oakham to join another closer Leicester school with official links to the Tigers' Academy. Walker was quoted as saying "“I did not think I’d enjoy things if I moved. If you are not enjoying it you are not going to play well, so I stayed at school and joined Quins full-time after I left.". He played for Zebre in 2019-20 Pro14 season.

Ahead of the 2020-21 RFU Championship Season, Walker signed for Ealing Trailfinders, a team he had briefly signed for on loan before breaking into the Harlequins first team.

Walker played for the England 7s in Hong Kong and Japan during the 2013 Circuit.
