= Alex Lozowski =

England international rugby union player

- Born: 30 June 1993 (age 33) Brent, London, England
- Height: 1.85 m (6 ft 1 in)
- Weight: 95 kg (14 st 13 lb; 209 lb)
- School: Watford Boys Grammar School
- University: Leeds University
- Notable relative: Rob Lozowski (father)

Rugby union career
- Position: Fly Half, Centre, Wing, Fullback
- Current team: Sale Sharks
Senior career
Years	Team	Apps	(Points)
2012–2014	Leeds Carnegie	26	(195)
2014–2016	Wasps	27	(116)
2016–2026	Saracens	196	(760)
2020–2021	→ Montpellier	27	(110)
2026-	Sale Sharks		
- Correct as of 18th May 2026
International career
Years	Team	Apps	(Points)
2017-2018	England	5	(5)
- Correct as of 28 July 2025

Alex Lozowski (born 30 June 1993) is an English professional rugby union footballer playing in the Gallagher Premiership for Sale Sharks.

== Early life ==
Lozowski is the son of Rob Lozowski and was a sporting allrounder in his teenage years, playing not only rugby for the Wasps academy but also football for the Chelsea academy. After leaving Watford Boys Grammar School he went to Leeds University to study a degree in economics.

== Club career ==
=== Leeds Tykes ===
While at university, Lozowski was selected on the bench for Leeds Carnegie, for their game against Pontypridd in the British and Irish Cup during the 2012/13 season. After impressing in this game he was selected as a member of their first team squad for the 2013/14 season in the RFU Championship. During this season he played not only Fly Half but also occasionally at Full back and made 25 appearances scoring 8 tries and 195 points in total. In recognition of his performances over the season, Lozowski was awarded Leed's Young Player of the Season award. It was announced during the season, that he would leave at the end of the season to join Wasps in the Aviva Premiership.

=== Wasps ===
Lozowski joined Wasps at the start of the 2014/15 season. He played very regularly for the team during the season, often coming off the bench for Andy Goode. During the season, he started against reigning Heineken Cup champions Toulon in the quarter-final of the European Rugby Champions Cup. He was also nominated for the LV Breakthrough Player of the Season for his performances in the LV Cup. Over the season, Lozowski played 21 matches scoring 2 tries and 102 points in total.

=== Saracens ===
On 13 January 2016, Lozowski made the switch to join Premiership rivals Saracens on a long-term deal ahead of the 2016–17 season. During his time at Saracens he has won three Premiership titles in 2018, 2019 and 2023. He also helped Saracens win the European Champions Cup in 2017 and 2019. He re-signed with Saracens for two years ahead of the 2020–21 season but will spend a season on loan at Montpellier.

=== Sale Sharks ===
In February 2026, he signed for Sale Sharks ahead of the following season.

== International career ==
=== England ===
Lozowski was called up to the senior England squad by Eddie Jones in October 2016. On 20 April 2017, Lozowski was named in the England tour party to Argentina in June for a 2-test series and made his international debut in the first test in San Juan on 10 June.

In October 2024, Lozowski was called into a 36-man England training camp. In February 2025, he was again called into the senior training squad for the second round of the 2025 Six Nations following a foot injury sustained by Cadan Murley.

=== International tries ===
As of 7 July 2019

Try	Opposing team	Location	Venue	Competition	Date	Result	Score
1	Samoa	London, England	Twickenham Stadium	2017 Autumn Internationals	25 November 2017	Win	48 – 14

== Honours ==
Saracens

- Aviva Premiership: 2018, 2019, 2023.
- European Rugby Champions Cup: 2017, 2019
- European Rugby Challenge Cup: 2021
