= Alex Tait (rugby union) =

English rugby union player

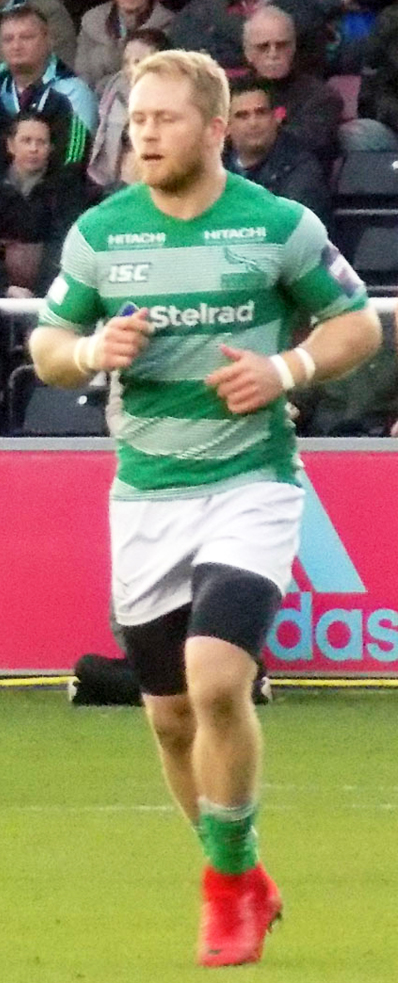
- Tait in 2018
- Born: Alexander Cameron Tait; 18 March 1988 (age 38) Shotley Bridge, County Durham, England
- Height: 1.82 m (6 ft 0 in)
- Weight: 94 kg (14 st 11 lb; 207 lb)
- School: Barnard Castle School
- University: Newcastle University
- Notable relative: Mathew Tait (brother)

Rugby union career
- Position(s): Fullback, Wing, Centre
- Current team: Newcastle Falcons
Senior career
Years	Team	Apps	(Points)
2007–2023	Newcastle Falcons	271	(200)
- Correct as of 20 April 2023
International career
Years	Team	Apps	(Points)
2007	England U19	5	(10)
2008	England U20	4	(0)

Alex Tait (born 18 March 1988) is a retired English rugby union player, who played for Newcastle Falcons in the Premiership.

== Rugby career ==
Tait's usual position is fullback, but he can also cover at centre. He made his first team début for Newcastle against Cetransa El Salvador in November 2007.

After making his first team debut in 2007, Tait became a regular for the Falcons in his decade at the club. Appearing over 200 times by the close of the 2017-2018 English Rugby Premiership season. "He has turned in extremely consistent performances which are right up there at the top," said director of rugby Dean Richards at the time. Acknowledging the hard grafting full-back's service to the Falcons.

2017-18 saw Tait scoring the Newcastle Falcons first and last tries of the campaign at home against Worcester and away to Exeter. Making 23 first team appearances, contributing to the Falcons' best season in 20 years. Tait signed a new contract with the Falcons from late 2017 onward.

On 17 April 2023, Tait announced his retirement at the end of the 2022–23 season.
