= Tommy Bell (rugby union) =

English rugby union player

- Born: Thomas Bell; 11 November 1992 (age 34) Plymouth, England
- Height: 1.83 m (6 ft 0 in)
- Weight: 86 kg (13 st 8 lb)
- School: Bacup and Rawtenstall Grammar School
- Notable relative: Chris Bell (brother)

Rugby union career
- Position(s): Full-back, Fly-half, Wing, Centre
- Current team: London Welsh Amateur
Senior career
Years	Team	Apps	(Points)
2010–2012	Sale Sharks	1	(5)
2011	→Leeds Carnegie	21	(234)
2012–2014	London Wasps	29	(81)
2014	Jersey	5	(62)
2014–2016	Leicester Tigers	31	(130)
2016–2019	London Irish	7	(86)
2019–2020	Ealing Trailfinders	16	(27)
2020	Asia Pacific Dragons		
2020–2021	Stade Montois	15	(16)
2022	Benetton	4	(0)
2022-24	Tokyo Gas RFC		
- Correct as of 5 Mar 2022
International career
Years	Team	Apps	(Points)
- England U18
2011–2012	England U20	6	(31)

Tommy Bell (born 11 November 1992) is a retired English rugby union player who most recently played for Tokyo Gas RFC in Japan. Prior to that his last club in Europe has been Benetton Rugby

He began his career with Sale Sharks in the Aviva Premiership, but moved to London Wasps for the 2012/2013 season, playing alongside his brother Chris Bell.

On 6 June 2014, Bell made his move to the RFU Championship as he signed a contract with Jersey. However, after a month with Jersey, Bell was granted early release from his contract since a top flight club made an approach to him where he would officially move to Leicester Tigers.

On 17 February 2016, Bell agreed to a long-term deal with London Irish from the 2016–17 season.

He joined RFU Championship side Ealing Trailfinders for the 2019–20 season. In 2022 he played for Benetton in United Rugby Championship. A move to Japan followed to play for Tokyo Gas before Bell retired from the professional game in 2024 returning to the UK and joining London Welsh Amateur playing at level 5 of the RFU pyramid.

After playing for England U18, from 2011 to 2012 Bell was named in the England U20 squad.
