= Mitch Lees =

Australian rugby union player

- Born: 12 October 1988 (age 38) Sydney, Australia
- Height: 1.98 m (6 ft 6 in)
- Weight: 122 kg (19 st 3 lb)

Rugby union career
- Position(s): Back-row, Lock
Senior career
Years	Team	Apps	(Points)
2013–2014	London Welsh	18	(5)
2014-2019	Exeter Chiefs	112	(40)
2019-2022	CA Brive	46	(15)

Mitch Lees (born 12 October 1988) is a former Australian rugby union player. Lees joined English side London Welsh from Eastwood. Lees made his senior grade debut for Eastwood in 2010, having joined the club as a colt. He made his 100th appearance for Eastwood in May 2013. His performances for Eastwood saw him selected for the ACT Brumbies A team in 2013.

Lees signed for Aviva Premiership side Exeter Chiefs on 10 April 2014. He was a replacement as Exeter Chiefs defeated Wasps to be crowned champions of the 2016-17 English Premiership.

On 10 July 2019, Lee left Exeter to sign for Top 14 side Brive in France from the 2019–20 season.
