= 2012–13 European Challenge Cup pool stage =

2012–13 Amlin Challenge Cup pool stage
- Season: 2012–13 European Challenge Cup
- Date: 11 October 2012 – 20 January 2013

Qualifiers
- Seed 1: (England) Bath
- Seed 2: (England) Gloucester
- Seed 3: (France) Perpignan
- Seed 4: (England) London Wasps
- Seed 5: (Ireland) Leinster (from HC)
- Seed 6: (France) Toulouse (from HC)
- Seed 7: (France) Biarritz (from HC)
- Seed 8: (France) Stade Français

The 2012–13 Amlin Challenge Cup pool stage was the opening stage of the 17th season of the European Challenge Cup, the second-tier competition for European rugby union clubs. It began with a match between Mont-de-Marsan and Gloucester on Thursday 11 October 2012 and ended on 19 January 2013 when Stade Français hosted competition newcomers London Welsh.

Twenty teams participated in this phase of the competition; they were divided into five pools of four teams each, with each team playing the others home and away. Competition points are earned using the standard bonus point system. The pool winners advanced to the knockout stage, where they were joined by three entrants from the Heineken Cup pool stage. These teams then competed in a single-elimination tournament that ended with the final at the RDS Arena in Dublin on 17 May 2012.

== Results ==
All times are local to the game location.

Key to colours
Winner of each pool advances to quarterfinals. Seed # in parentheses.

=== Pool 1 ===
Team	P	W	D	L	PF	PA	Diff	TF	TA	TB	LB	Pts
(England) Gloucester (2)	6	6	0	0	179	86	+93	19	7	3	0	27
(England) London Irish	6	4	0	2	174	139	+35	24	14	2	1	19
(France) Mont-de-Marsan	6	2	0	4	100	156	−56	9	21	0	2	10
(France) Bordeaux-Bègles	6	0	0	6	82	154	−72	7	17	0	2	2
Source : www.ercrugby.com Points breakdown: *4 points for a win *2 points for a draw *1 bonus point for a loss by seven points or less *1 bonus point for scoring four or more tries in a match

11 October 2012
20:30

(1 BP) Mont-de-Marsan (France)	6–11	(England) Gloucester
Pen: Claverie (2/2) 54', 73'	Report	Try: Clark 29' m Pen: Taylor (1/3) 52'; Twelvetrees (1/1) 61'

Stade Guy Boniface, Mont-de-Marsan
Attendance: 4,160
Referee: Neil Hennessy (Wales)

13 October 2012
21:00

Bordeaux-Bègles (France)	16–43	(England) London Irish (1 BP)
Try: Brousse 78' c Con: Serin (1/1); Pen: Munro (2/2) 1', 13'; Talebulamaijaina (1/1) 44'	Report	Try: Hala'ufia 14' c Ojo 21' c Aulika 49' c Tagicakibau (2) 54' c, 63' m Joseph 71' c Con: Humphreys (4/5); Shingler (1/1); Pen: Humphreys (1/1) 42'

Stade André Moga, Bègles
Attendance: 4,200
Referee: Dudley Phillips (Ireland)

18 October 2012
19:45

(1 BP) Gloucester (England)	25–13	(France) Bordeaux-Bègles
Try: James 5' m Twelvetrees 11' m Sharples (2) 24' m, 35' c Con: Twelvetrees (1/4); Pen: Twelvetrees (1/3) 34'	Report	Try: Gibouin 80' c Con: Lopez (1/1); Pen: Sánchez (2/3) 17', 23'

Kingsholm, Gloucester
Attendance: 9,576
Referee: Marius Mitrea (Italy)

20 October 2012
15:00

(1 BP) London Irish (England)	69–26	(France) Mont-de-Marsan
Try: Gibson 1' c Evans 3' m Humphreys 21' m Aulika 30' c Joseph 43' c Tagicakibau 51' m Watson (2) 56' m, 79' c Ojo (2) 60' c, 74' c Winter-Moates 63' c Con: Humphreys (4/8); Shingler (3/3)	Report	Try: Giudicelli 49' c Liebenberg 70' c Con: Duvallet (2/2); Pen: Duvallet (4/4) 8', 14', 28', 37'

Madejski Stadium, Reading
Attendance: 5,720
Referee: Andrew McMenemy (Scotland)

6 December 2012
20:30

(1 BP) Bordeaux-Bègles (France)	13–20	(France) Mont-de-Marsan
Try: Domvo 35' c Con: Munro (1/1); Pen: Munro (2/4) 19', 22'	Report	Try: Pic 32' c Beaulavon 39' c Con: Douvesy (2/2); Pen: Douvesy (2/4) 8', 69'

Stade André Moga, Bègles
Attendance: 2,468
Referee: JP Doyle (England)

8 December 2012
15:00

(1 BP) London Irish (England)	22–29	(England) Gloucester
Try: Tagicakibau 2' c Aulika 44' c Watson 47' m Con: Humphreys (2/3); Pen: Humphreys (1/2) 25'	Report	Try: Murphy 55' c F. Burns 61' c Con: F. Burns (2/2); Pen: F. Burns (5/6) 5', 33', 42', 69', 73'

Madejski Stadium, Reading
Attendance: 7,309
Referee: Dudley Phillips (Ireland)

14 December 2012
19:00

Mont-de-Marsan (France)	18–7	(France) Bordeaux-Bègles
Try: Pic 11' c Ryder 50' m Con: Douvesy (1/2); Pen: Douvesy (2/4) 40', 47'	Report	Try: Gibouin 76' c Con: Sánchez (1/1)

Stade Guy Boniface, Mont-de-Marsan
Attendance: 2,194
Referee: Luke Pearce (England)

15 December 2012
15:00

(1 BP) Gloucester (England)	47–3	(England) London Irish
Try: Monahan (4) 34' c, 40' c, 59' c, 71' m Cook 43' c Robson 73' m Con: F. Burns (4/6); Pen: F. Burns (3/3) 6', 23', 39'	Report	Pen: Homer (1/2) 11'

Kingsholm, Gloucester
Attendance: 10,535
Referee: Neil Paterson (Scotland)

10 January 2013
19:00

(1 BP) Mont-de-Marsan (France)	14–20	(England) London Irish
Try: Lucu (2) 55' c, 74' c Con: Duvallet (1/1); Claverie (1/1)	Report	Try: Winter-Moates (2) 26' c, 46' c Con: Shingler (2/2); Pen: Shingler (2/3) 12', 71'

Stade Guy Boniface, Mont-de-Marsan
Attendance: 2,678
Referee: Marius Mitrea (Italy)

11 January 2013
19:00

(1 BP) Bordeaux-Bègles (France)	26–31	(England) Gloucester
Try: Carballo 17' c Leupolu 39' c Con: Munro (2/2); Pen: Munro (4/4) 2', 13', 45', 57'	Report	Try: Dawidiuk 30' c Con: F. Burns (1/1); Pen: F. Burns (8/8) 4', 20', 24', 36', 54', 62', 75', 80'

Stade André Moga, Bègles
Attendance: 3,500
Referee: Andrew McMenemy (Scotland)

19 January 2013
15:00

(1 BP) Gloucester (England)	36–16	(France) Mont-de-Marsan
Try: May (2) 9' m, 78' c Sharples 22' m Trinder (2) 59' m, 63' m Con: Twelvetrees (1/4); Pen: F. Burns (1/1) 2'; Twelvetrees (2/2) 21', 50'	Report	Try: Brethous 27' c Con: Claverie (1/1); Pen: Claverie (3/4) 4', 13', 18'

Kingsholm, Gloucester
Attendance: 8,955
Referee: Dudley Phillips (Ireland)

19 January 2013
15:00

London Irish (England)	17–7	(France) Bordeaux-Bègles
Try: Joseph 28' c Yarde 56' c Con: Shingler (2/2); Pen: Shingler (1/2) 40'	Report	Try: Larrieu 10' c Con: Sánchez (1/1)

Madejski Stadium, Reading
Attendance: 1,800
Referee: David Wilkinson (Ireland)

=== Pool 2 ===
Team	P	W	D	L	PF	PA	Diff	TF	TA	TB	LB	Pts
(France) Perpignan (3)	6	5	0	1	293	89	+204	42	5	4	1	25
(England) Worcester Warriors	6	5	0	1	354	78	+276	51	7	4	1	25
(Spain) Gernika	6	2	0	4	80	309	−229	6	47	0	0	8
(Italy) Rovigo	6	0	0	6	67	318	−251	6	46	0	1	1
Source : www.ercrugby.com Points breakdown: *4 points for a win *2 points for a draw *1 bonus point for a loss by seven points or less *1 bonus point for scoring four or more tries in a match

- Per the Competition Rules, Perpignan and Worcester were level on the first tiebreaker of head-to-head competition points (5–5); Perpignan topped the pool on the second tiebreaker of head-to-head try count (3–1).

13 October 2012
15:00

Rovigo (Italy)	12–79	(France) Perpignan (1 BP)
Pen: Basson (4/4) 5', 13', 19', 26'	Report	Try: Batlle (2) 10' c, 30' c Planté 37' c Piukala 45' c Mafi (2) 50' c, 57' c penalty try 58' c Michel (2) 68' m, 78' m Vahaamahina (2) 74' c, 75' c Con: Mélé (9/11); Pen: Mélé (2/2) 3', 21'

Stadio Comunale Mario Battaglini, Rovigo
Attendance: 1,000
Referee: Andrew McMenemy (Scotland)

13 October 2012
16:00

Gernika (Spain)	5–85	(England) Worcester Warriors (1 BP)
Try: Mazzochi 58' m	Report	Try: Cowan (2) 7' c, 12' c Howard (2) 15' m, 63' m Short (2) 26' c, 31' c Hodgson (2) 40' c, 50' c Porter 41' c Stelling (3) 71' m, 74' c, 78' c Grove 76' c Con: Carlisle (10/13)

Estadio Urbieta, Gernika
Attendance: 1,000
Referee: Giuseppe Vivarini (Italy)

20 October 2012
15:00

(1 BP) Worcester Warriors (England)	90–3	(Italy) Rovigo
Try: Betty 5' c Claassens 7' m Lemi (4) 13' m, 25' c, 42' c, 53' c Short (3) 21' c, 65' c, 75' m Kvesic (2) 49' c, 71' c Carlisle (2) 51' c, 57' m Gillies 61' c Con: Carlisle (10/14)	Report	Pen: Basson (1/2) 28'

Sixways, Worcester
Attendance: 6,147
Referee: Ian Davies (Wales)

20 October 2012
19:00

(1 BP) Perpignan (France)	90–12	(Spain) Gernika
Try: Planté (5) 1' m, 13' c, 71' c, 77' m, 80' c Hume (2) 6' c, 58' c Guiry 18' c Sid 24' c Michel (2) 46' m, 50' c Delonca 54' m Vilaceca 63' c Piukala 75' c Con: Bosch (10/14)	Report	Pen: Cusack (4/4) 11', 20', 28', 40'

Stade Aimé Giral, Perpignan
Attendance: 7,182
Referee: Ian Tempest (England)

6 December 2012
19:45

Worcester Warriors (England)	22–21	(France) Perpignan (1 BP)
Try: Goode 34' c Con: Goode (1/1); Pen: Goode (5/5) 3', 8', 26', 65', 77'	Report	Try: Cazenave 16' m penalty try 63' c Con: Hook (1/2); Pen: Hook (2/3) 46', 53'; Drop: Hook (1/2) 40'

Sixways, Worcester
Attendance: 7,801
Referee: Neil Hennessy (Wales)

8 December 2012
16:00

Gernika (Spain)	13–3	(Italy) Rovigo
Try: Magunazelaia 37' c Con: Cusack (1/1); Pen: Cusack (2/2) 59', 71'	Report	Pen: Duca (1/2) 47'

Estadio Urbieta, Gernika
Attendance: 600
Referee: David Wilkinson (Ireland)

15 December 2012
15:00

(1 BP) Rovigo (Italy)	10–16	(Spain) Gernika
Try: Montauriol 22' c Con: Wilson (1/1); Pen: Lenarduzzi (1/1) 73'	Report	Try: Olaeta 11'; Cusack 59' m Pen: Cusack (2/2) 3', 45'

Stadio Comunale Mario Battaglini, Rovigo
Attendance: 600
Referee: Leo Colgan (Ireland)

15 December 2012
21:00

Perpignan (France)	13–6	(England) Worcester Warriors (1 BP)
Try: Haughton 8' c Con: Hook (1/1); Pen: Hook (2/4) 33', 37'	Report	Pen: Goode (2/2) 35', 50'

Stade Aimé Giral, Perpignan
Attendance: 10,135
Referee: Ian Davies (Wales)

12 January 2013
15:00

Rovigo (Italy)	17–80	(England) Worcester Warriors (1 BP)
Try: Montauriol 33' c Menon 40' c Con: Basson (2/2); Pen: Basson (1/1) 48'	Report	Try: Walker (2) 13' c, 71' c Cowan (2) 21' m, 75' m Drauniniu (3) 24' c, 29' c, 80' c Abbott 51' c Short 54' c Stelling (2) 58' c, 69' c Best 76' c Con: Gray (10/12)

Stadio Comunale Mario Battaglini, Rovigo
Attendance: 500
Referee: Ian Davies (Wales)

12 January 2013
16:00

Gernika (Spain)	15–50	(France) Perpignan (1 BP)
Try: Dias 14' m Olaeta 25' c Con: Cusack (1/2); Pen: Cusack (1/1) 30'	Report	Try: Mafi (3) 3' m, 7' c, 58' c Batlle (2) 10' c, 78' m Cazenave 17' c Schuster 36' c Sid 71' m Con: Bosch (5/8)

Estadio Urbieta, Gernika
Attendance: 500
Referee: Ian Tempest (England)

17 January 2013
21:00

(1 BP) Perpignan (France)	40–22	(Italy) Rovigo
Try: Sid (2) 4' c, 7' c Batlle 21' c Pulu 29' c penalty try 54' c Hook 74' m Con: Bosch (5/6)	Report	Try: Mahoney 10' m Bacchetti (2) 31' c, 64' c Con: Basson (2/3); Pen: Basson (1/2) 15'

Stade Aimé Giral, Perpignan
Attendance: 5,278
Referee: Neil Hennessy (Wales)

19 January 2013
15:00

(1 BP) Worcester Warriors (England)	71–19	(Spain) Gernika
Try: Drauniniu (2) 4' c, 80' c Claassens (2) 8' m, 31' c Walker (2) 18' c, 58' m Abbott 27' m Gray 38' c Cowan 49' c Lutui 61' c Howard 73' c Con: Gray (8/11)	Report	Try: Salas 10' c Con: Cusack (1/1); Pen: Cusack (4/4) 15', 21', 40', 53'

Sixways, Worcester
Attendance: 2,424
Referee: Cédric Marchat (France)

=== Pool 3 ===
Team	P	W	D	L	PF	PA	Diff	TF	TA	TB	LB	Pts
(England) London Wasps (4)	6	5	1	0	231	92	+139	30	9	3	0	25
(France) Bayonne	6	4	1	1	201	91	+110	25	7	2	0	20
(Wales) Newport Gwent Dragons	6	2	0	4	171	108	+63	19	10	2	3	13
(Italy) Mogliano	6	0	0	6	29	341	−312	4	52	0	0	0
Source : www.ercrugby.com Points breakdown: *4 points for a win *2 points for a draw *1 bonus point for a loss by seven points or less *1 bonus point for scoring four or more tries in a match

12 October 2012
20:00

(1 BP) Bayonne (France)	71–7	(Italy) Mogliano
Try: Manukula 3' c O'Connor (2) 10' c, 55' m Bernad 13' c penalty try 16' c Gerber 24' c Boutaty 35' m Carillo 51' c Lacroix 68' c Rokocoko 72' m Ugalde 80' c Con: Boyet (5/6); Ugalde (3/5)	Report	Try: Barbini 48' c Con: Galon (1/1)

Stade Jean Dauger, Bayonne
Attendance: 5,550
Referee: Ian Tempest (England)

13 October 2012
20:10

(1 BP) London Wasps (England)	38–25	(Wales) Newport Gwent Dragons
Try: Wallace 5' c Staibano 14' c Vunipola 29' m Simpson 58' c Con: Robinson (3/4); Pen: Robinson (4/5) 9', 18', 44', 49'	Report	Try: Hughes 2' m O. Evans 34' c Dixon 74' c Con: Robling (2/3); Pen: Robling (2/2) 40', 55'

Adams Park, High Wycombe
Attendance: 4,186
Referee: Mathieu Raynal (France)

20 October 2012
20:10

(1 BP) Newport Gwent Dragons (Wales)	19–22	(France) Bayonne
Try: Brown 5' c Con: Prydie (1/1); Pen: Prydie (4/4) 14', 20', 31', 52'	Report	Try: Chisholm 36' c Con: Boyet (1/1); Pen: Boyet (5/7) 9', 13', 39', 47', 68'

Rodney Parade, Newport
Attendance: 4,054
Referee: Luke Pearce (England)

21 October 2012
14:30

Mogliano (Italy)	12–59	(England) London Wasps (1 BP)
Try: Maso 28' m Galon 54' c Con: Galon (1/1)	Report	Try: T. Thomas 7' c Poff 18' c Southwell 25' c Wade (2) 30' c, 63' c Masi 33' c Johnson 48' c Payne 69' m Launchbury 80' m Con: Bell (7/9)

Stadio Maurizio Quaggia, Mogliano Veneto
Attendance: 1,950
Referee: David Wilkinson (Ireland)

8 December 2012
14:00

Mogliano (Italy)	0–33	(Wales) Newport Gwent Dragons (1 BP)
	Report	Try: Tuilagi 7' c I. Jones (2) 22' c, 44' m Harries 27' c Prydie 70' c Con: Prydie (4/5)

Stadio Maurizio Quaggia, Mogliano Veneto
Attendance: 885
Referee: Ian Tempest (England)

8 December 2012
21:00

Bayonne (France)	13–13	(England) London Wasps
Try: O'Connor 39' c Con: Potgieter (1/1); Pen: Potgieter (2/2) 24', 67'	Report	Try: Wade 58' m Swainston 72' m Pen: Robinson (1/2) 51'

Stade Jean Dauger, Bayonne
Attendance: 9,658
Referee: Marius Mitrea (Italy)

13 December 2012
19:45

London Wasps (England)	30–16	(France) Bayonne
Try: Daly 31' m Masi 73' c Con: Robinson (1/1); Pen: St. Jones (4/4) 2', 5', 13', 49'; Daly (1/1) 36'; Robinson (1/1) 77'	Report	Try: Rokocoko 40' c Con: Potgieter (1/1); Pen: Potgieter (3/5) 44', 51', 60'

Adams Park, High Wycombe
Attendance: 4,040
Referee: Andrew McMenemy (Scotland)

16 December 2012
17:35

(1 BP) Newport Gwent Dragons (Wales)	53–3	(Italy) Mogliano
Try: D. Evans 6' c Poole 19' m penalty try 29' c W. Evans 37' c Leach 59' m J. Evans 69' c Price 75' m Dixon 80' c Con: D. Evans (3/5); Robling (2/3); Pen: D. Evans (1/1) 13'	Report	Pen: Endrizzi (1/1)

Rodney Parade, Newport
Attendance: 4,473
Referee: David Wilkinson (Ireland)

10 January 2013
20:45

Bayonne (France)	25–22	(Wales) Newport Gwent Dragons (1 BP)
Try: Roumieu 54' c Gerber 64' m Phillips 76' c Con: Potgieter (1/1); Ugalde (1/2); Pen: Potgieter (2/3) 1', 20'	Report	Try: L. Evans 21' c Con: Prydie (1/1); Pen: Prydie (5/7) 10', 29', 35', 52', 68'

Stade Jean Dauger, Bayonne
Attendance: 1,922
Referee: Andrew Small (England)

12 January 2013
15:00

(1 BP) London Wasps (England)	71–7	(Italy) Mogliano
Try: Varndell (3) 1' c, 6' c, 13' c C. Bell 16' c Cannon 33' m Wallace 40' c Davies (2) 45' c, 64' c Lindsay 59' m Wentzel 67' m Masi 74' c Con: Robinson (8/11)	Report	Try: Candiago 51' c Con: Endrizzi (1/1)

Adams Park, High Wycombe
Attendance: 5,744
Referee: Cédric Marchat (France)

17 January 2013
19:45

(1 BP) Newport Gwent Dragons (Wales)	19–20	(England) London Wasps
Try: D. Evans 25'; Con: Prydie (1/1); Pen: Prydie (3/6) 13', 39', 52'; Steffan Jones (1/1) 74'	Report	Try: penalty try 35' c Robinson 56' c Con: Robinson (2/2); Pen: Robinson (2/5) 20', 29'

Rodney Parade, Newport
Attendance: 4,089
Referee: Marius Mitrea (Italy)

19 January 2013
14:00

Mogliano (Italy)	0–54	(France) Bayonne (1 BP)
	Report	Try: Fuster (2) 14' m, 56' c Potgieter 17' c Gerber 21' c Phillips 24' c O'Connor 26' c Lovobalavu 53' c Lacroix 79' c Con: Potgieter (5/6); Boyet (2/2)

Stadio Maurizio Quaggia, Mogliano Veneto
Attendance: 1,332
Referee: Ian Davies (Wales)

=== Pool 4 ===
Team	P	W	D	L	PF	PA	Diff	TF	TA	TB	LB	Pts
(England) Bath (1)	6	6	0	0	245	79	+166	36	7	5	0	29
(France) Agen	6	3	0	3	154	120	+34	18	12	2	3	17
(Romania) București Wolves	6	2	0	4	121	215	−94	14	29	1	0	9
(Italy) Calvisano	6	1	0	5	117	223	−106	13	33	2	1	7
Source : www.ercrugby.com Points breakdown: *4 points for a win *2 points for a draw *1 bonus point for a loss by seven points or less *1 bonus point for scoring four or more tries in a match

13 October 2012
15:00

București Wolves (Romania)	17–40	(England) Bath (1 BP)
Try: Surugiu 39' c Munteanu 71' c Con: Vlaicu (1/1); Wiringi (1/1); Pen: Vlaicu (1/1) 55'	Report	Try: Spencer 20' c Batty 33' c Vesty 45' c Devoto 66' m Palma-Newport 78' m Con: Vesty (3/5); Pen: Vesty (3/3) 1', 11', 27'

Stadionul Arcul de Triumf, Bucharest
Attendance: 1,500
Referee: Cédric Marchat (France)

13 October 2012
19:00

(2 BP) Calvisano (Italy)	31–36	(France) Agen (1 BP)
Try: Brancoli 2' c Erasmus (2) 37' c, 51' c Vunisa 61' c Con: Griffen (4/4); Pen: Griffen (1/1) 24'	Report	Try: Bastien 5' c Fono 20' c Dupuy 33' c Vaquin 39' c Tagotago 41' m Con: Lagarde (4/5); Pen: Lagarde (1/1) 10'

Peroni Stadium, Calvisano
Attendance: 1,100
Referee: David Wilkinson (Ireland)

18 October 2012
20:45

(1 BP) Agen (France)	22–27	(England) Bath (1 BP)
Try: Petre 3' c Con: Lagarde (1/1); Pen: Lagarde (5/5) 21', 44', 48', 58', 71'	Report	Try: Claassens 33' m Eastmond 46' c Donald 54' m Louw 79' c Con: Donald (2/4); Pen: Donald (1/2) 5'

Stade Armandie, Agen
Attendance: 4,576
Referee: Neil Hennessy (Wales)

20 October 2012
15:00

(1 BP) București Wolves (Romania)	42–27	(Italy) Calvisano
Try: Rus 1' c Botezatu 35' m Filip 51' m Turashvili 65' c Lemnaru 71' c Wiringi 79' m Con: Filip (1/3); Wiringi (2/3); Pen: Filip (2/2) 14', 37'	Report	Try: Vilk 26' c Griffen 64' c Lovotti 76' c Con: Griffen (3/3); Pen: Griffen (2/3) 16', 34'

Stadionul Arcul de Triumf, Bucharest
Attendance: 1,012
Referee: Laurent Cardona (France)

8 December 2012
14:15

(1 BP) Bath (England)	67–11	(Italy) Calvisano
Try: Köster 25' m Day 39' c Ovens 42' c Mercer 46' m Agulla (2) 48' c, 57' c McMillan 53' c penalty try 66' c Palma-Newport 71' m Attwood 80' c Con: Heathcote (7/10); Pen: Heathcote (1/1) 3'	Report	Try: Castello 17' m Pen: Griffen (2/3) 31', 42'

Recreation Ground, Bath
Attendance: 11,445
Referee: Cédric Marchat (France)

8 December 2012
15:00

București Wolves (Romania)	25–22	(France) Agen (1 BP)
Try: Botezatu 2' m Fercu 43' c Dinis 53' c Con: Wiringi (1/2); Vlaicu (1/1); Pen: Wiringi (1/2) 28'; Vlaicu (1/1) 79'	Report	Try: Fonua 39' m Agulla 63' c penalty try 74' c Con: Lamoulie (2/3); Pen: Lamoulie (1/1) 6'

Stadionul Arcul de Triumf, Bucharest
Attendance: 1,100
Referee: Giuseppe Vivarini (Italy)

14 December 2012
19:00

(1 BP) Agen (France)	39–9	(Romania) București Wolves
Try: Barthomeuf 6' c Fono 56' c Agulla 64' c Petre 69' m Lamoulie 75' c Con: Lamoulie (4/5); Pen: Lamoulie (2/2) 27', 33'	Report	Pen: Vlaicu (3/4) 14', 29', 42'

Stade Armandie, Agen
Attendance: 2,107
Referee: Ian Tempest (England)

15 December 2012
14:30

Calvisano (Italy)	5–39	(England) Bath (1 BP)
Try: Ferraro 78' m	Report	Try: Sharman 2' c Agulla (3) 11' m, 31' m, 80' m Biggs 36' c Cuthbert 45' m Ovens 68' m Con: Donald (2/5)

Peroni Stadium, Calvisano
Attendance: 800
Referee: Laurent Cardona (France)

12 January 2013
14:15

Bath (England)	19–16	(France) Agen (1 BP)
Try: James 30' c Con: Heathcote (1/1); Pen: Heathcote (4/7) 3', 7', 45', 63'	Report	Try: Fono 57' c Con: Lagarde (1/1); Pen: Lagarde (3/3) 5', 23', 33'

Recreation Ground, Bath
Attendance: 9,131
Referee: Dudley Phillips (Ireland)

12 January 2013
14:30

(1 BP) Calvisano (Italy)	34–20	(Romania) București Wolves
Try: Scanferla (2) 29' c, 72' c Gerosa 39' c Vilk 67' c Con: Griffen (4/4); Pen: Griffen (2/2) 1', 22'	Report	Try: Surugiu 7' c Dascălu 31' c Con: Vlaicu (2/2); Pen: Vlaicu (2/3) 16', 70'

Peroni Stadium, Calvisano
Attendance: 1,200
Referee: Leo Colgan (Ireland)

18 January 2013
19:00

Agen (France)	19–9	(Italy) Calvisano
Try: Janaudy 30' c Julien 45' m Erbani 53' c Con: Lagarde (2/3)	Report	Pen: Griffen (3/3) 2', 14', 34'

Stade Armandie, Agen
Attendance: 1,170
Referee: Ian Tempest (England)

19 January 2013
14:00

(1 BP) Bath (England)	53–8	(Romania) București Wolves
Try: Dunn 13' c penalty try 20' c Cuthbert (3) 24' m, 27' m, 71' c Agulla 41' m Köster 59' c Cook 68' m Skuse 75' m Con: Heathcote (3/6); Vesty (1/3)	Report	Try: Diaconescu 45' m Pen: Vlaicu (1/1) 15'

Recreation Ground, Bath
Attendance: 9,873
Referee: Laurent Cardona (France)

=== Pool 5 ===
Team	P	W	D	L	PF	PA	Diff	TF	TA	TB	LB	Pts
(France) Stade Français (8)	6	5	0	1	210	105	+105	25	7	4	1	25
(France) Grenoble	6	4	0	2	173	81	+92	21	6	3	1	20
(England) London Welsh	6	2	0	3	171	170	+1	20	24	2	0	14
(Italy) Cavalieri Prato	6	0	0	6	68	266	−198	8	37	1	1	2
Source : www.ercrugby.com Points breakdown: *4 points for a win *2 points for a draw *1 bonus point for a loss by seven points or less *1 bonus point for scoring four or more tries in a match

12 October 2012
19:30

(1 BP) Grenoble (France)	59–3	(Italy) Cavalieri Prato
Try: Nicolas 6' m Darbo 26' c penalty try 34' c Coetzee 42' c Hegarty 49' m Nouhaillaguet 60' c Fabro 67' c Pollard 70' c Pelissie 77' c Con: Darbo (3/5); Laharrague (4/4)	Report	Pen: Della Rossa (1/1) 10'

Stade Lesdiguières, Grenoble
Attendance: 6,000
Referee: Ian Davies (Wales)

13 October 2012
15:00

London Welsh (England)	19–68	(France) Stade Français (1 BP)
Try: George 30' c Con: Henson (1/1); Pen: Henson (4/4) 4', 9', 35', 43'	Report	Try: Bonfils (2) 1' c, 53' c Bonneval (2) 16' m, 72' c Vuidarvuwalu (2) 19' c, 27' c Fainifo 47' c Guillemain 58' c Contepomi 75' m Con: Contepomi (7/9); Pen: Contepomi (2/2) 13', 39'; Drop: Bonneval (1/1) 40'

Kassam Stadium, Oxford
Attendance: 3,748
Referee: Marius Mitrea (Italy)

20 October 2012
14:00

(2 BP) Cavalieri Prato (Italy)	31–32	(England) London Welsh
Try: Majstorovic 38' c Ngawini 50' c Tempestini 69' c Bernini 75' c Con: Della Rossa (1/1); Patelli (1/1); Frati (2/2); Pen: Della Rossa (1/1) 14'	Report	Try: George 11' c Ajuwa (2) 25' m, 46' m Con: Ross (1/3); Pen: Ross (3/5) 18', 31', 57'; Davies (2/2) 67', 78'

Stadio Enrico Chersoni, Prato
Attendance: 1,500
Referee: Leo Colgan (Ireland)

20 October 2012
21:00

Stade Français (France)	28–25	(France) Grenoble (1 BP)
Try: Bonfils 2' c Con: Dupuy (1/1); Pen: Dupuy (3/4) 6', 30', 40'; Contepomi (2/3) 68', 77'; Drop: Bézy (1/2) 21'; Plisson (1/1) 51'	Report	Try: Nicolas 72' c Con: Darbo (1/1); Pen: Laharrague (5/6) 12', 28', 32', 50', 54'; Darbo (1/1) 74'

Stade Océane, Le Havre
Attendance: 11,548
Referee: Andrew Small (England)

7 December 2012
19:30

Grenoble (France)	20–9	(England) London Welsh
Try: Campo 50' c Farley 76' c Con: Darbo (1/1); Hart (1/1); Pen: Darbo (2/4) 12', 39'	Report	Pen: Davies (3/6) 24', 28', 47'

Stade Lesdiguières, Grenoble
Attendance: 5,800
Referee: Andrew McMenemy (Scotland)

- Grenoble won the game 20–9, but London Welsh were retroactively awarded a 28–0 victory and five match points, after Grenoble admitted fielding an ineligible player, Lotu Taukeiaho, during the match.

8 December 2012
14:00

Cavalieri Prato (Italy)	23–37	(France) Stade Français (1 BP)
Try: Ruffolo 11' m Sepe 21' c Cannone 80' c Con: Frati (1/2); Pen: Frati (2/2) 18', 52'	Report	Try: Fainifo (3) 6' c, 53' m, 77' m Fillol 9' c penalty try 66' c Con: Bézy (3/5); Pen: Bézy (2/2) 14', 31'

Stadio Enrico Chersoni, Prato
Attendance: 1,200
Referee: Ian Davies (Wales)

13 December 2012
20:45

(1 BP) Stade Français (France)	29–6	(Italy) Cavalieri Prato
Try: Guillemain 21' m Garrault 49' c Sinzelle 73' c Fainifo 75' c Con: Porical (3/4); Pen: Porical (1/2) 13'	Report	Pen: Ragusi (2/3) 15', 27'

MMArena, Le Mans
Attendance: 12,186
Referee: Neil Hennessy (Wales)

15 December 2012
13:30

London Welsh (England)	13–27	(France) Grenoble (1 BP)
Try: Denbee 70' c Con: Davies (1/1); Pen: Davies (2/3) 33', 35'	Report	Try: Bouchet (2) 19' c, 27' m Ninard 42' c Taukeiaho 73' m Con: Courrent (2/3); Pen: Courrent (1/1) 3'

Old Deer Park, London
Attendance: 1,630
Referee: Marius Mitrea (Italy)

12 January 2013
14:00

(1 BP) London Welsh (England)	62–5	(Italy) Cavalieri Prato
Try: Beach 7' c George 18' c Lewis 27' m Arscott (2) 34' c, 62' m Davies 55' c Mackenzie 57' c Smith 74' c Hills 79' c Con: Davies (7/9); Pen: Davies (1/1) 12'	Report	Try: Damiani 53' m

Kassam Stadium, Oxford
Attendance: 1,580
Referee: David Wilkinson (Ireland)

12 January 2013
21:00

Grenoble (France)	15–9	(France) Stade Français (1 BP)
Pen: Darbo (4/6) 8', 36', 44', 62'; Laharrague (1/1) 73'	Report	Pen: Porical (3/5) 15', 20', 59'

Stade Lesdiguières, Grenoble
Attendance: 6,209
Referee: Luke Pearce (England)

19 January 2013
14:00

Cavalieri Prato (Italy)	0–47	(France) Grenoble (1 BP)
	Report	Try: Tuculet (2) 4' m, 38' c Bouchet (3) 9' c, 26' c, 29' c Butonidualevu 14' c Jaouher 68' c Con: Laharrague (6/7)

Stadio Enrico Chersoni, Prato
Attendance: 350
Referee: Leo Colgan (Ireland)

19 January 2013
21:00

(1 BP) Stade Français (France)	39–17	(England) London Welsh
Try: Arias 9' m Papé 27' m Doumayrou 34' m penalty try 46' c Bonfils 53' c Fainifo 74' c Con: Bézy (3/6); Pen: Bézy (1/1) 19'	Report	Try: Mackenzie (2) 57' c, 61' c Con: Davies (2/2); Pen: Davies (1/2) 3'

Stade du Hainaut, Valenciennes
Attendance: 9,972
Referee: Andrew McMenemy (Scotland)

== See also ==
- European Challenge Cup
- 2012–13 Heineken Cup
