= Gernika RT =

Spanish rugby union club, based in Gernika

(Spain) Bizkaia Gernika
- Full name: Gernika Rugby Taldea
- Founded: 1973; 53 years ago
- Location: Gernika, Basque Country, Spain
- Ground: Urbieta zelaia (Capacity: 1,000)
- Chairman: José Alberto Pradera
- Coach: Oskar Astarloa
- League: División de Honor
- 2015–16: División de Honor, 11th
1st kit	2nd kit

Official website
- www.gernikarugby.com

Gernika Rugby Taldea is a Basque rugby union team based in Gernika, Bizkaia, which play in the Spanish League. The team was set up by some rugby supporters of the bombed village, and is enjoying a steady rise in popularity in the region.

For the 2012–13 season, Gernika took part in the European Challenge Cup. Despite finishing fifth in the División de Honor in 2011–12 and losing in the playoff semifinals, Gernika were tapped for the Challenge Cup when the sides finishing ahead of them bowed out due to financial constraints.

== Honours ==
- División de Honor B: 3
  - Champions: 1983–84, 1989–90, 2008–09
- Copa del Rey: 0
  - Runners-up: 1991

== 2012–13 ==
=== Challenge Cup ===
Gernika RT played in pool 2 of the 2012–13 European Challenge Cup.

==== Final table ====
Team	P	W	D	L	PF	PA	Diff	TF	TA	TB	LB	Pts
(France) Perpignan (3)	6	5	0	1	293	89	+204	42	5	4	1	25
(England) Worcester Warriors	6	5	0	1	354	78	+276	51	7	4	1	25
(Spain) Gernika RT	6	2	0	4	80	309	−229	6	47	0	0	8
(Italy) Rovigo	6	0	0	6	67	318	−251	6	46	0	1	1
Source : www.ercrugby.com Points breakdown: *4 points for a win *2 points for a draw *1 bonus point for a loss by seven points or less *1 bonus point for scoring four or more tries in a match

- Per the Competition Rules, Perpignan and Worcester were level on the first tiebreaker of head-to-head competition points (5–5); Perpignan topped the pool on the second tiebreaker of head-to-head try count (3–1).

==== Matches ====
13 October 2012
16:00

Gernika RT (Spain)	5–85	(England) Worcester Warriors (1 BP)
Try: Mazzochi 58' m	Report	Try: Cowan (2) 7' c, 12' c Howard (2) 15' m, 63' m Short (2) 26' c, 31' c Hodgson (2) 40' c, 50' c Porter 41' c Stelling (3) 71' m, 74' c, 78' c Grove 76' c Con: Carlisle (10/13)

Estadio Urbieta, Gernika
Attendance: 1,000
Referee: Giuseppe Vivarini (Italy)

20 October 2012
19:00

(1 BP) Perpignan (France)	90–12	(Spain) Gernika RT
Try: Planté (5) 1' m, 13' c, 71' c, 77' m, 80' c Hume (2) 6' c, 58' c Guiry 18' c Sid 24' c Michel (2) 46' m, 50' c Delonca 54' m Vilaceca 63' c Piukala 75' c Con: Bosch (10/14)	Report	Pen: Cusack (4/4) 11', 20', 28', 40'

Stade Aimé Giral, Perpignan
Attendance: 7,182
Referee: Ian Tempest (England)

8 December 2012
16:00

Gernika RT (Spain)	13–3	(Italy) Rovigo
Try: Magunazelaia 37' c Con: Cusack (1/1); Pen: Cusack (2/2) 59', 71'	Report	Pen: Duca (1/2) 47'

Estadio Urbieta, Gernika
Attendance: 600
Referee: David Wilkinson (Ireland)

15 December 2012
15:00

(1 BP) Rovigo (Italy)	10–16	(Spain) Gernika RT
Try: Montauriol 22' c Con: Wilson (1/1); Pen: Lenarduzzi (1/1) 73'	Report	Try: Olaeta 11'; Cusack 59' m Pen: Cusack (2/2) 3', 45'

Stadio Comunale Mario Battaglini, Rovigo
Attendance: 600
Referee: Leo Colgan (Ireland)

12 January 2013
16:00

Gernika RT (Spain)	15–50	(France) Perpignan (1 BP)
Try: Dias 14' m Olaeta 25' c Con: Cusack (1/2); Pen: Cusack (1/1) 30'	Report	Try: Mafi (3) 3' m, 7' c, 58' c Batlle (2) 10' c, 78' m Cazenave 17' c Schuster 36' c Sid 71' m Con: Bosch (5/8)

Estadio Urbieta, Gernika
Attendance: 500
Referee: Ian Tempest (England)

19 January 2013
15:00

(1 BP) Worcester Warriors (England)	71–19	(Spain) Gernika RT
Try: Drauniniu (2) 4' c, 80' c Claassens (2) 8' m, 31' c Walker (2) 18' c, 58' m Abbott 27' m Gray 38' c Cowan 49' c Lutui 61' c Howard 73' c Con: Gray (8/11)	Report	Try: Salas 10' c Con: Cusack (1/1); Pen: Cusack (4/4) 15', 21', 40', 53'

Sixways, Worcester
Attendance: 2,424
Referee: Cédric Marchat (France)

== Season by season ==
Season	Tier	Division	Pos.	Notes
1977–78	2	Primera Nacional	8th	
1978–79	2	Primera Nacional	4th	
1979–80	2	Primera Nacional	5th	
1980–81	2	Primera Nacional	5th	↑
1981–82	1	División de Honor	6th	↓
1982–83	2	Primera Nacional	2nd	
1983–84	2	Primera Nacional	1st	
1984–85	2	Primera Nacional	4th	
1985–86	2	Primera Nacional	5th	
1986–87	2	Primera Nacional	5th	
1987–88	2	Primera Nacional	3rd	
1988–89	2	Primera Nacional	3rd	
1989–90	2	Primera Nacional	1st	↑
1990–91	1	División de Honor	7th	
1991–92	1	División de Honor	8th	
1992–93	1	División de Honor	12th	↓
1993–94	2	Primera Nacional	9th	
1994–95	2	Primera Nacional	3rd	
1995–96	2	Primera Nacional	6th	
1996–97	2	Primera Nacional	4th	

Season	Tier	Division	Pos.	Notes
1997–98	2	Primera Nacional	4th	
1998–99	3	Primera Nacional	7th	↓
1999–00	4	Segunda Nacional	—	↑
2000–01	3	Primera Nacional	4th	
2001–02	3	Primera Nacional	5th	
2002–03	3	Primera Nacional	5th	
2003–04	3	Primera Nacional	3rd	
2004–05	3	Primera Nacional	1st	↑
2005–06	2	División de Honor B	3rd	
2006–07	2	División de Honor B	4th	
2007–08	2	División de Honor B	2nd	
2008–09	2	División de Honor B	1st	↑
2009–10	1	División de Honor	8th	
2010–11	1	División de Honor	4th	
2011–12	1	División de Honor	5th / SF	
2012–13	1	División de Honor	3rd / QF	
2013–14	1	División de Honor	9th	
2014–15	1	División de Honor	6th	
2015–16	1	División de Honor	11th	

- 11 seasons in División de Honor
