= 2012–13 LV Cup =

Tournament details
- Countries: England; Wales
- Tournament format(s): Round-robin and knockout
- Date: 9 November 2012 – 17 March 2013

Tournament statistics
- Teams: 16
- Matches played: 35
- Attendance: 266,587 (7,617 per match)
- Tries scored: 157 (4.49 per match)
- Top point scorer(s): Ben Botica (Harlequins) (78 points)
- Top try scorer(s): Tonderai Chavhanga (Newport Gwent Dragons); Danny Cipriani (Sale Sharks); Andy Fenby (Scarlets); Ben Morgan (Gloucester); Jack Nowell (Exeter Chiefs); Semesa Rokoduguni (Bath); Tom Williams (Harlequins); Marland Yarde (London Irish) (3 tries)

Final
- Venue: Sixways Stadium, Worcester
- Attendance: 8,100
- Champions: Harlequins (3rd title)
- Runners-up: Sale Sharks

The 2012–13 LV Cup (styled as the LV= Cup) is the 42nd season of England's national rugby union cup competition, and the eighth to follow the Anglo-Welsh format.

The competition consists of the four Welsh Pro12 teams and the 12 English Premiership clubs arranged into pools consisting of three English and one Welsh team. English clubs have been allocated to the pools depending on their finish in the 2011-12 Aviva Premiership. Welsh regions have been allocated to the pools to avoid repeating fixtures from the Heineken and Amlin Challenge cups where possible. Teams are guaranteed two home and two away pool matches, with teams in Pools 1 and 4 playing each other and teams in Pools 2 and 3 playing each other, with the top team from each pool qualifying for the semi-finals. The competition will take place during the Autumn Internationals window and during the Six Nations thus allowing teams to develop their squad players.

Leicester Tigers are defending champions this season after claiming the cup with a 26–14 victory over Northampton Saints in the final at Sixways Stadium in Worcester. It was the seventh victory for Leicester Tigers (a record) in the competition, and the second since the current Anglo-Welsh format was adopted in 2005.

== Pool stages ==
=== Points system ===
The points scoring system for the pool stages will be as follows:

- 4 points for a win
- 2 points for a draw
- 1 bonus point for scoring four or more tries in a match (TB)
- 1 bonus point for a loss by seven points or less (LB)

=== Pool 1 v Pool 4 ===
Pool 1
Team	P	W	D	L	PF	PA	PD	TF	TB	LB	Pts
(England) Harlequins	4	4	0	0	91	60	+31	7	1	0	17
(England) Exeter Chiefs	4	3	0	1	99	63	+36	11	1	0	13
(Wales) Newport Gwent Dragons	4	2	0	2	95	94	+1	8	0	0	8
(England) Gloucester	4	1	0	3	85	111	−26	11	1	1	6

Pool 4
Team	P	W	D	L	PF	PA	PD	TF	TB	LB	Pts
(England) Bath	4	3	0	1	96	47	49	10	1	0	13
(England) Northampton Saints	4	2	0	2	105	86	19	9	0	1	9
(Wales) Ospreys	4	1	0	3	72	84	−12	4	0	2	6
(England) London Welsh	4	0	0	4	55	153	−98	3	0	0	0

==== Round 1 ====
9 November 2012
19:45

Ospreys (Wales)	33–27	(England) Gloucester
Try: Grabham 64' m Allen 78' c Con: Davies 79'; Pen: Morgan (4) 10', 34', 40', 56'; Davies 60'; Drop: Morgan (2) 20', 29'	Report	Try: Thomas 26' c Murphy 71' c Penalty try 75' c Con: Burns 27'; Robson (2) 71', 76'; Pen: Burns (2) 8', 16'

Liberty Stadium, Swansea
Attendance: 5,738
Referee: David Rose (England)

10 November 2012
13:00

Northampton Saints (England)	30–31	(England) Harlequins
Try: Burrell 49' m May 59' c Con: Lamb 60'; Pen: Lamb (5) 2', 10', 40', 48', 64'; Drop: Lamb 77'	Report	Try: Smith (2) 6' c, 33' c Sloan 25' c Botica 80' c Con: Botica (4) 7', 26', 34', 80'; Pen: Botica 54'

Franklin's Gardens, Northampton
Attendance: 11,586
Referee: Neil Hennessey (Wales)

10 November 2012
14:15

Bath (England)	36–15	(Wales) Newport Gwent Dragons
Try: Rokoduguni (2) 8' c, 74' c Banahan 42' c Con: Heathcote (3) 8', 43', 75'; Pen: Heathcote (5) 2', 20', 24', 34', 40'	Report	Try: Wardle 5' c Evans 80' m Con: Jones 6'; Pen: Jones 21'

Recreation Ground, Bath
Attendance: 10,960
Referee: Llyr Ap Geraint-Roberts (England)

11 November 2012
16:00

London Welsh (England)	15–42	(England) Exeter Chiefs
Pen: Ross (5) 6', 25', 38', 56', 58'	Report	Try: Carrick-Smith 28' m Foster 49' c Nowell (2) 64' m, 77' c Sestaret (2) 68' c, 72' m Con: Slade (3) 50', 69', 78'; Pen: Slade (2) 10', 43'

Kassam Stadium, Oxford
Attendance: 2,084
Referee: Ian Davies (Wales)

==== Round 2 ====
16 November 2012
19:45

Harlequins (England)	21–12	(England) Bath
Pen: Botica (5) 1', 4', 14', 18', 31'; Grimoldby (2) 67', 71'	Report	Pen: Donald (3) 16', 28', 45'; Heathcote (1) 64'

Twickenham Stoop, London
Attendance: 11,655
Referee: James Jones (Wales)

17 November 2012
16:30

Gloucester (England)	46–20	(England) London Welsh
Try: Monahan 7' c Morgan (3) 21' c, 36' c, 73' c Qera 29' c Britton 64' m Con: Burns (4) 8', 22', 29', 37'; Cook 74'; Pen: Burns (2) 4', 25'	Report	Try: Scott 59' c Tideswell 76' c Con: Ross 59'; Davies 76'; Pen: Ross (2) 10', 19'

Kingsholm, Gloucester
Attendance: 9,936
Referee: Tim Wigglesworth (England)

17 November 2012
17:00

Exeter Chiefs (England)	23–13	(Wales) Ospreys
Try: Carrick-Smith 28' c Dorrian 40' c Con: Slade (2) 28', 40'; Pen: Slade (3) 2', 55', 66'	Report	Try: Allen 10' c Con: Davies 10'; Pen: Davies (2) 31', 45'

Sandy Park, Exeter
Attendance: 7,829
Referee: Greg Garner (England)

18 November 2012
15:15

Newport Gwent Dragons (Wales)	20–30	(England) Northampton Saints
Try: Chavhanga (3) 34' c, 44' m, 70' m Con: Prydie 35'; Pen: Prydie 22'	Report	Try: Dowson 49' c Elliott 62' m Con: Lamb 50'; Pen: Lamb (5) 13', 25', 43', 56', 59'; Drop: Lamb 74'

Rodney Parade, Newport
Attendance: 5,312
Referee: Luke Pearce (England)

==== Round 3 ====
26 January 2013
14:15

Bath (England)	16–6	(England) Exeter Chiefs
Try: Stringer (2) 56' m, 61' m Pen: Heathcote (2) 4', 31'	Report	Pen: Slade (2) 8', 23'

Recreation Ground, Bath
Attendance: 11,170
Referee: Nigel Owens (Wales)

26 January 2013
15:00

Harlequins (England)	23–6	(England) London Welsh
Try: Lambert 15' c Ward 74' c Con: Botica (2/2); Pen: Botica (3) 20', 46', 65'	Report	Pen: Davies (2) 14', 25'

Twickenham Stoop, London
Attendance: 12,356
Referee: Neil Hennessey (Wales)

26 January 2013
15:00

Northampton Saints (England)	26–7	(England) Gloucester
Try: Burrell 32'; Waller 66'; Con: Lamb (1/1); Myler (1/1); Pen: Lamb (2) 9', 22'; Myler (2) 55', 62'	Report	Try: Mills 24' c Con: Mills

Franklin's Gardens, Northampton
Attendance: 12,722
Referee: Luke Pearce (England)

26 January 2013
18:30

Dragons (Wales)	18–14	(Wales) Ospreys
Pen: S. Jones (6) 2', 7', 30', 49', 65', 73'	Report	Try: Thomas 59' m Pen: Morgan (3) 24', 34', 38'

Rodney Parade, Newport
Attendance: 4,607
Referee: Llyr Ap Geraint-Roberts (England)

==== Round 4 ====
2 February 2013
14:00

Gloucester (England)	5–32	(England) Bath
Try: Edmonds 34' m	Report	Try: Woodburn 11' m Abendanon 49' m Gilbert 64' m Rokoduguni 68' c Donald 75' c Con: Vesty (2); Pen: Vesty 61'

Kingsholm, Gloucester
Attendance: 13,243
Referee: Ian Davies (Wales)

2 February 2013
18:30

Exeter Chiefs (England)	28–19	(England) Northampton Saints
Try: White 7' c Nowell 15' m Votu 26' c Con: Mieres (2); Pen: Mieres 31', 63', 68'	Report	Try: Waller 35' m Dickson 59' c, 76' c Con: Myler (2)

Sandy Park, Exeter
Attendance: 8,181
Referee: JP Doyle (England)

3 February 2013
15:00

London Welsh (England)	14–42	(Wales) Newport Gwent Dragons
Try: Williamson 53' m Pen: Davies (3) 20', 25', 34'	Report	Try: Amos 69' c I. Jones 73' c Groves 77' c Con: S Jones (3); Pen: S Jones (7) 17', 27', 42', 56', 60', 62', 80'

Kassam Stadium, Oxford
Attendance: 1,772
Referee: Andrew Small (England)

3 February 2013
17:00

Ospreys (Wales)	12–16	(England) Harlequins
Pen: Morgan (4) 7', 34', 40', 54'	Report	Try: Hopper 29' c Con: Botica (1); Pen: Botica (3) 12', 16', 80'

Brewery Field, Bridgend
Attendance: 2,849
Referee: Martin Fox (England)

=== Pool 2 v Pool 3 ===
Pool 2
Team	P	W	D	L	PF	PA	PD	TF	TB	LB	Pts
(England) Sale Sharks	4	3	0	1	122	104	18	15	2	1	15
(England) Leicester Tigers	4	2	0	2	96	101	−5	12	1	0	9
(Wales) Cardiff Blues	4	2	0	2	59	64	−5	6	0	1	9
(England) Worcester Warriors	4	1	0	3	89	114	−25	12	1	0	5

Pool 3
Team	P	W	D	L	PF	PA	PD	TF	TB	LB	Pts
(England) Saracens	4	3	0	1	102	69	33	8	1	1	14
(England) London Irish	4	2	0	2	101	84	17	12	2	2	12
(Wales) Scarlets	4	2	0	2	97	105	−8	8	0	0	8
(England) London Wasps	4	1	0	3	83	108	−25	8	0	2	6

==== Round 1 ====
9 November 2012
19:30

Cardiff Blues (Wales)	22–17	(England) London Wasps
Try: Fish 12' c James 58' m Sweeney 69' c Con: Davies 13'; Sweeney 70'; Pen: Davies 44'	Report	Try: Daly 35' m Pen: Bell (4) 14', 24', 39', 56'

Cardiff Arms Park, Cardiff
Attendance: 7,046
Referee: Luke Pearce (England)

9 November 2012
19:45

Saracens (England)	38–21	(England) Leicester Tigers
Try: George 20' c Taylor 35' c Maddock 40' c Saull 64' m Con: Mordt (3) 21', 36', 40'; Pen: Mordt (4) 6', 27', 47', 73'	Report	Try: Cain 52' c Noone 56' c Thacker 80' c Con: Cornwell (3) 53', 57', 80'

Goldington Road, Bedford
Attendance: 3,168
Referee: James Jones (Wales)

10 November 2012
15:00

Worcester Warriors (England)	34–18	(Wales) Scarlets
Try: Howard 54' c Taulava 68' c Abbott 73' c Best 79' c Con: Carlisle (4) 55', 68', 73', 80'; Pen: Carlisle (2) 3', 13'	Report	Try: Fenby 16' c Phillips 76' m Con: O. Williams 17'; Pen: O. Williams (2) 6', 11'

Sixways, Worcester
Attendance: 7,489
Referee: Tim Wigglesworth (England)

11 November 2012
15:00

London Irish (England)	34–28	(England) Sale Sharks
Try: Garvey (2) 22' c, 63' c Skivington 50' c Geraghty 76' m Con: Humphreys (4) 23', 51', 64', 77'; Pen: Humphreys (2) 31', 75'	Report	Try: Peel 2' m Cipriani 38' c Amesbury 80' c Con: Cipriani 39'; Miller 80'; Pen: Cipriani (3) 17', 37', 43'

Madejski Stadium, Reading
Attendance: 8,654
Referee: Ian Tempest (England)

==== Round 2 ====
16 November 2012
20:00

Sale Sharks (England)	25–23	(England) Saracens
Try: Cueto 2' m Penalty try 19' c McKenzie 50' c Con: Davies (2) 20', 52'; Pen: Cipriani 56'; Miller 72'	Report	Try: Ratuvou 7' c Tomkins 40' c Con: Mordt (2) 8', 40'; Pen: Mordt (2) 6', 36'; Spencer 58'

Salford City Stadium, Salford
Attendance: 5,243
Referee: Llyr Ap Geraint-Roberts (England)

17 November 2012
18:30

Scarlets (Wales)	22–16	(Wales) Cardiff Blues
Try: Penalty try 35' c Con: Owen 35'; Pen: Owen 6'; Williams 40'; Thomas (3) 64', 68', 71'	Report	Try: Hamilton 15' c Con: Davies 16'; Pen: Davies (3) 26', 31', 43'

Parc y Scarlets, Llanelli
Attendance: 6,469
Referee: JP Doyle (England)

18 November 2012
15:00

Leicester Tigers (England)	22–15	(England) London Irish
Try: Andrew 19' c Con: Ford 20'; Pen: Ford (5) 23', 39', 47', 57', 79'	Report	Try: Watson 8' m Homer 69' c Con: Humphreys 70'; Pen: Humphreys 3'

Welford Road, Leicester
Attendance: 17,569
Referee: Ian Davies (Wales)

18 November 2012
15:00

London Wasps (England)	28–19	(England) Worcester Warriors
Try: McIntyre 6' c Wallace 61' c Davies 71' m Con: Bell (2) 7', 62'; Pen: Bell (3) 31', 38', 46'	Report	Try: Grove 26' m Short 29' c Howard 69' c Con: Carlisle (2) 30', 70'

Adams Park, High Wycombe
Attendance: 5,152
Referee: Rhys Thomas (Wales)

==== Round 3 ====
26 January 2013
15:00

Leicester Tigers (England)	34–8	(England) London Wasps
Try: Mulipola 17' c Noone 37' m Tait 61' m Goneva (2) 67' c, 77' c Con: Bowden (1); Cornwell (2); Pen: Bowden (1) 29'	Report	Try: Southwell 74' m Pen: T. Bell (1) 46'

Welford Road, Leicester
Attendance: 19,757
Referee: David Rose (England)

26 January 2013
15:00

Sale Sharks (England)	36–17	(Wales) Scarlets
Try: Vernon 31' m Amesbury 40' c Cipriani 64' c Ingall 75' m Con: Cipriani (40, 64); Pen: Cipriani (4) 13', 24', 28', 56'	Report	Try: Fenby 4' c G. Davies 20' c Con: O. Williams (2/2); Pen: O. Williams (1) 49'

Salford City Stadium, Salford
Attendance: 3,108
Referee: Ian Tempest (England)

27 January 2013
15:00

London Irish (England)	46–24	(England) Worcester Warriors
Try: Aulika (2) 14' c, 29' c Yarde (3) 40' m, 65' c, 78' c A. Gray 55' c Con: Homer (5/6); Pen: Homer (2) 9', 42'	Report	Try: D. Gray 52' c Lemi 64' c Percival 73' c Con: D. Gray (1/1); Goode (2/2); Pen: D. Gray (1) 2'

Madejski Stadium, Reading
Attendance: 5,038
Referee: Leighton Hodges (Wales)

27 January 2013
15:00

Saracens (England)	19–11	(Wales) Cardiff Blues
Try: Short 78' c Con: Mordt (1/1); Pen: Mordt (4) 3', 27', 49', 62'	Report	Try: Copeland 35' m Pen: Sweeney (1) 5'; Davies (1) 72'

Allianz Park, London
Attendance: 3,726
Referee: Rhys Thomas (Wales)

==== Round 4 ====
1 February 2013
19:30

Cardiff Blues (Wales)	10–6	(England) London Irish
Try: Evans 33' c Con: Patchell (1); Pen: Patchell (1) 69'	Report	Pen: Homer (2) 20', 55'

Cardiff Arms Park, Cardiff
Attendance: 5,938
Referee: Ian Tempest (England)

2 February 2013
14:00

London Wasps (England)	30–33	(England) Sale Sharks
Try: Hayter 4' c Davies 69' c Sam Jones 80' c Con: Stephen Jones (1); T. Bell (2); Pen: Stephen Jones (2) 12', 24'; T. Bell (1) 35'	Report	Try: Penalty try 17' c Myall 21' c Tuitupou 42' c Taylor 45' m Cipriani 48' m Con: Cipriani (4)

Adams Park, High Wycombe
Attendance: 5,430
Referee: David Rose (England)

2 February 2013
15:00

Worcester (England)	12–22	(England) Saracens
Try: Cowan 15' c Drauniniu 55' m Con: Goode (1)	Report	Try: Joubert 2' c Con: Spencer (1); Pen: Spencer (5) 9', 40', 57', 73', 78'

Sixways, Worcester
Attendance: 6,552
Referee: Tim Wigglesworth (England)

3 February 2013
13:00

Scarlets (Wales)	40–19	(England) Leicester Tigers
Try: Fenby 69' c Owen 76' m Reynolds 78' c Con: A. Thomas (2); Pen: O. Williams (7) 6', 14', 18', 21', 34', 44', 59'	Report	Try: Waldrom 10' m Penalty try 30' c Forsyth 40' c Con: Cornwell (2)

Parc y Scarlets, Llanelli
Attendance: 6,496
Referee: Greg Garner (England)

== Knock–out stage ==
Semi-finals
9 March – Twickenham Stoop
(England) Harlequins	31
(England) Bath	23
10 March – Salford City Stadium
(England) Sale Sharks	21
(England) Saracens	15

Final
17 March – Sixways
(England) Harlequins	32
(England) Sale Sharks	14

=== Qualification criteria ===
The top teams from each pool qualify for the knockout stages. The pool winners will be decided by the following criteria:

1. The pool winner will be the club with the highest number of match points in each pool. The pool winners will be ranked 1 to 4 by reference to the number of match points earned in the pools.
2. If two or more clubs in the same pool end the pool stage equal on match points, then the order in which they have finished will be determined by:

i. the greater number of matches won by the club and
ii. if the number of matches won is equal, the club with the greater total number of tries scored and
iii. if the total number of tries scored is equal, the club with the greater points difference (points scored for, less points scored against) and
iv. if the points difference is equal, the club with the fewer number of red cards and
v. if the number of red cards is the same, by the toss a coin.

Each of the four qualifying clubs shall be ranked as above and shall play each other as follows:

Semi-final 1 – 1st ranked club v 4th ranked club
Semi-final 2 – 2nd ranked club v 3rd ranked club

The first club listed in each of the semi-final matches shall be the home club.

Qualifiers
Rank	Team	P	W	D	L	PF	PA	PD	TF	TB	LB	Pts
1	(England) Harlequins	4	4	0	0	91	60	31	7	1	0	17
2	(England) Sale Sharks	4	3	0	1	122	104	18	15	2	1	15
3	(England) Saracens	4	3	0	1	102	69	33	8	1	1	14
4	(England) Bath	4	3	0	1	96	47	49	10	1	0	13

=== Semi-finals ===
9 March 2013
12:15

Harlequins (England)	31–23	(England) Bath
Try: Guest 8' c Williams 20' c, 52'c Dickson 36' c Con: Botica (4/4); Pen: Botica (1) 67'	Report	Try: Louw 26' c Abendanon 58' c Con: Heathcote (2/2); Pen: Heathcote (3) 39', 42', 63'

Twickenham Stoop, London
Attendance: 6,523
Referee: Leighton Hodges (Wales)

10 March 2013
13:00

Sale Sharks (England)	21–15	(England) Saracens
Try: Holmes 37' m Fowles 67' c Con: Cipriani (1/2); Pen: Cipriani (3) 4', 17', 78'	Report	Pen: Spencer (5) 5', 8', 14', 24', 63'

Salford City Stadium, Salford
Attendance: 3,129
Referee: JP Doyle (England)

=== Final ===
17 March 2013
15:00

Harlequins (England)	32–14	(England) Sale Sharks
Try: Williams 9' m Guest 26' c Casson 44' c Wallace 53' c Con: Botica (3/4); Pen: Botica (2) 4', 33'	Report	Try: Leota 56' m Pen: Cipriani (3) 15', 30', 42'

Sixways, Worcester
Attendance: 8,100
Referee: Greg Garner (England)

15	(England) Ross Chisholm
14	(England) Tom Williams
13	(England) George Lowe
12	(England) Tom Casson
11	(England) Sam Smith
10	(New Zealand) Ben Botica
9	(England) Karl Dickson
8	(England) Tom Guest
7	(England) Luke Wallace (c)
6	(Samoa) Maurie Fa'asavalu
5	(England) Charlie Matthews
4	(England) Sam Twomey
3	(England) Will Collier
2	(England) Rob Buchanan
1	(England) Mark Lambert
Replacements:
16	(England) Dave Ward
17	(England) Darryl Marfo
18	(Samoa) James Johnston
19	(Ireland) Peter Browne
20	(England) Joe Trayfoot
21	(England) Jordan Burns
22	(England) Rory Clegg
23	(England) Charlie Walker
Coach:
(England) John Kingston

15	(Wales) Nick Macleod
14	(England) Tom Brady
13	(Samoa) Johnny Leota
12	(New Zealand) Sam Tuitupou
11	(England) Charlie Ingall
10	(England) Danny Cipriani
9	(England) Nathan Fowles
8	(Wales) Andy Powell
7	(England) David Seymour (c)
6	(England) James Gaskell
5	(England) Tom Holmes
4	(Scotland) Fraser McKenzie
3	(Ireland) Tony Buckley
2	(England) Tommy Taylor
1	(Scotland) Alasdair Dickinson
Replacements:
16	(England) Aston Croall
17	(England) Ross Harrison
18	(England) Henry Thomas
19	(Russia) Andrei Ostrikov
20	(New Zealand) Daniel Braid
21	(Wales) Dwayne Peel
22	(England) Charlie Amesbury
23	(England) Mark Cueto
Coach:
(England) Steve Diamond

- Harlequins gain a place in the 2013–14 Heineken Cup by winning this competition.

== Top scorers ==
=== Top points scorers ===
Rank	Player	Team	Points
1	Ben Botica	(England) Harlequins	78
2	Danny Cipriani	(England) Sale Sharks	73
3	Steffan Jones	(Wales) Dragons	50
4	Ryan Lamb	(England) Northampton Saints	48
5	Tom Heathcote	(England) Bath	43
6	Nils Mordt	(England) Saracens	42
7	Matthew Morgan	(Wales) Ospreys	39
8	Owen Williams	(Wales) Scarlets	36
9	Tommy Bell	(England) London Wasps	35
9	Ben Spencer	(England) Saracens	35

=== Top try scorers ===
Rank	Player	Team	Tries
1	Tonderai Chavhanga	(Wales) Dragons	3
1	Danny Cipriani	(England) Sale Sharks	3
1	Andy Fenby	(Wales) Scarlets	3
1	Ben Morgan	(England) Gloucester	3
1	Jack Nowell	(England) Exeter	3
1	Semesa Rokoduguni	(England) Bath	3
1	Tom Williams	(England) Harlequins	3
1	Marland Yarde	(England) London Irish	3

== See also ==
- 2012–13 English Premiership (rugby union)
- 2012–13 Pro 12
