= 2012–13 European Challenge Cup =

Rugby union tournament that concluded in 2013

2012–13 Amlin Challenge Cup

Tournament details
- Countries: England; France; Ireland; Italy; Romania; Spain; Wales
- Tournament format(s): Round-robin and knockout
- Date: 11 October 2012 to 17 May 2013

Tournament statistics
- Teams: 23
- Matches played: 67
- Attendance: 355,554 (5,307 per match)
- Tries scored: 438 (6.54 per match)
- Top point scorer(s): Freddie Burns (Gloucester) (86 points)
- Top try scorer(s): Horacio Agulla (Bath); Francis Fainifo (Stade Français); Adrien Planté (Perpignan); Andy Short (Worcester) (6 tries)

Final
- Venue: RDS Arena
- Attendance: 20,396
- Champions: (Ireland) Leinster (1st title)
- Runners-up: (France) Stade Français

The 2012–13 Amlin Challenge Cup was the 17th season of the European Challenge Cup, Europe's second-tier club rugby union competition. A total of 23 teams participated — 20 in the pool stage, plus three teams parachuting into the knockout stages from the Heineken Cup. The original 20 teams represented six countries, with a seventh country represented by one of the three teams transferring from the Heineken Cup.

The pool stage began in Mont-de-Marsan on 11 October 2012, with Stade Montois hosting Gloucester. It ended on 19 January 2013 when Stade Français hosted competition newcomers London Welsh, followed by the knockout stages culminating in the final at the RDS Arena in Dublin on 17 May 2013.

The defending Challenge Cup champions, France's Biarritz Olympique, did not initially have a chance to defend their crown because they earned an automatic berth in the Heineken Cup. However, having finish 2nd in their pool, and failing to reach the knockout stages of the Heineken Cup, they were one of three teams parachuted into the Challenge Cup knockout stages. They were knocked out of the competition by Leinster at the semi-final stage. Leinster went on to win the competition, defeating Stade Français 34–13 in the final.

== Teams ==
Gernika Rugby Taldea represented Spain despite finishing just 5th in the División de Honor. Valladolid won the División de Honor, and the championship playoff, but turned down the opportunity to play in the Challenge Cup due to economic factors. As runners up in the championship playoff, Gernika qualified in their place.

England	France	Italy	Romania	Spain	Wales
London Wasps; Bath; Gloucester; London Irish; Worcester Warriors; London Welsh	Stade Français; Perpignan; Bayonne; Agen; Bordeaux-Bègles; Mont-de-Marsan; Grenoble	Calvisano; Rovigo; Cavalieri Prato; Mogliano	București Wolves	Gernika	Newport Gwent Dragons

== Seeding ==
Teams that did not qualify for the 2012–13 Heineken Cup were ordered into four tiers according to the European Rugby Club Ranking. Five pools of four teams were drawn comprising one team from each tier.

The brackets show each team's European Rugby Club Ranking at the end of the 2011–12 season.

Tier 1	(France) Stade Français (10)	(England) London Wasps (15)	(France) Perpignan (16)	(England) Bath (17)	(England) Gloucester (22)
Tier 2	(England) London Irish (23)	(Wales) Newport Gwent Dragons (31)	(England) London Welsh	(England) Worcester Warriors (35)	(Italy) Calvisano (39)
Tier 3	(France) Bayonne (40)	(Italy) Rovigo (41)	(France) Agen (42)	(Italy) Cavalieri Prato (43)	(France) Bordeaux-Bègles (44)
Tier 4	(France) Mont de Marsan (45)	(France) Grenoble (46)	(Italy) Mogliano (47)	(Romania) București Wolves	(Spain) Gernika

== Pool stage ==
Key to colours
Winner of each pool advances to quarterfinals. Seed # in parentheses.

Points breakdown:

4 points for a win
2 points for a draw
1 bonus point for scoring four or more tries in a match (TB)
1 bonus point for a loss by seven points or less (LB)

Source: www.ercrugby.com

=== Pool 1 ===
Team	P	W	D	L	PF	PA	Diff	TF	TA	TB	LB	Pts
(England) Gloucester (2)	6	6	0	0	179	86	+93	19	7	3	0	27
(England) London Irish	6	4	0	2	174	139	+35	24	14	2	1	19
(France) Mont-de-Marsan	6	2	0	4	100	156	−56	9	21	0	2	10
(France) Bordeaux-Bègles	6	0	0	6	82	154	−72	7	17	0	2	2

=== Pool 2 ===
Team	P	W	D	L	PF	PA	Diff	TF	TA	TB	LB	Pts
(France) Perpignan (3)	6	5	0	1	293	89	+204	42	5	4	1	25
(England) Worcester Warriors	6	5	0	1	354	78	+276	51	7	4	1	25
(Spain) Gernika	6	2	0	4	80	309	−229	6	47	0	0	8
(Italy) Rovigo	6	0	0	6	67	318	−251	6	46	0	1	1

- Per the Competition Rules, Perpignan and Worcester were level on the first tiebreaker of head-to-head competition points (5–5); Perpignan topped the pool on the second tiebreaker of head-to-head try count (3–1).

=== Pool 3 ===
Team	P	W	D	L	PF	PA	Diff	TF	TA	TB	LB	Pts
(England) London Wasps (4)	6	5	1	0	231	92	+139	30	9	3	0	25
(France) Bayonne	6	4	1	1	201	91	+110	25	7	2	0	20
(Wales) Newport Gwent Dragons	6	2	0	4	171	108	+63	19	10	2	3	13
(Italy) Mogliano	6	0	0	6	29	341	−312	4	52	0	0	0

=== Pool 4 ===
Team	P	W	D	L	PF	PA	Diff	TF	TA	TB	LB	Pts
(England) Bath (1)	6	6	0	0	245	79	+166	36	7	5	0	29
(France) Agen	6	3	0	3	154	120	+34	18	12	2	3	17
(Romania) București Wolves	6	2	0	4	121	215	−94	14	29	1	0	9
(Italy) Calvisano	6	1	0	5	117	223	−106	13	33	2	1	7

=== Pool 5 ===
Team	P	W	D	L	PF	PA	Diff	TF	TA	TB	LB	Pts
(France) Stade Français (8)	6	5	0	1	210	105	+105	25	7	4	1	25
(France) Grenoble	6	4	0	2	173	81	+92	21	6	3	1	20
(England) London Welsh	6	3	0	3	171	170	+1	20	24	2	0	14
(Italy) Cavalieri Prato	6	0	0	6	68	266	−198	8	37	1	1	2

- The result of the Grenoble / London Welsh match on 7 December 2012 was 20–9 to Grenoble, but London Welsh were retroactively awarded a 28–0 victory and five match points, after Grenoble admitted fielding an ineligible player, Lotu Taukeiaho, during the match.

=== Seeding for knockout stage ===
Following the end of the pool stage, the 5 pool winners were seeded alongside the 3 2012–13 Heineken Cup pool runners-up who failed to qualify for the Heineken Cup quarter-finals – designated (HC). Teams are ranked by total number of Competition Points earned (4 for a win, 2 for a draw, etc.) in the pool stages. If this does not separate the teams, qualification/ranking will be based on:

(a) the number of tries scored in all Pool matches.
(b) aggregate points difference from all Pool matches.
(c) the Club with the fewest players sent off and / or suspended in all Pool matches.
(d) toss of a coin.

Seed	Team	Pts	TF	+/−
1	(England) Bath	29	36	+166
2	(England) Gloucester	27	19	+93
3	(France) Perpignan	25	42	+204
4	(England) London Wasps	25	30	+139
5 (HC)	(Ireland) Leinster	20	12	+28
6 (HC)	(France) Toulouse	19	15	+48
7 (HC)	(France) Biarritz	15	14	+22
8	(France) Stade Français	25	25	+105

== Knockout stage ==
All kickoff times are local to the match location.

=== Quarter-finals ===
4 April 2013
20:00

Gloucester (England)	31–41	(France) Biarritz
Try: Tindall 13' m Monahan 78' c Edmonds 80' c Con: F. Burns (2/3); Pen: F. Burns (4/5) 10', 26', 34', 47'	Report	Try: Thomas (2) 22' c, 31' c Héguy 36' c Baby 56' c Burotu 73' c Con: Yachvili (5/5); Pen: Yachvili (1/3) 18'; Drop: Traille (1/1) 11'

Kingsholm Stadium, Gloucester
Attendance: 10,273
Referee: John Lacey (Ireland)

5 April 2013
20:00

London Wasps (England)	28–48	(Ireland) Leinster
Try: Wade (2) 1' m, 14' c Varndell (2) 65' m, 70' m Con: Robinson (1/4); Pen: Robinson (2/3) 35', 48'	Report	Try: D'Arcy 5' c Madigan 22' c Ross 45' c R. Kearney 59' m Nacewa 67' c Con: Madigan (4/5); Pen: Madigan (5/6) 26', 38', 44', 52', 76'

Adams Park, High Wycombe
Attendance: 9,654
Referee: Pascal Gaüzère (France)

5 April 2013
21:00

Perpignan (France)	30–19	(France) Toulouse
Try: Taofifenua 6' c Sid 37' c Vahaamahina 46' c Con: Hook (3/3); Pen: Hook (3/3) 1', 71', 75'	Report	Try: Maka 58' c Con: Beauxis (1/1); Pen: Beauxis (4/5) 10', 19', 22', 24'

Stade Aimé Giral, Perpignan
Attendance: 12,452
Referee: Alain Rolland (Ireland)

6 April 2013
13:00

Bath (England)	20–36	(France) Stade Français
Try: penalty try 46' c Claassens 65' m Cuthbert 77' m Con: Donald (1/1); Pen: Donald (1/1) 25'	Report	Try: Vuidravuwalu (2) 19' c, 29' c Bonneval (2) 57' m, 59' m Con: Fillol (2/2); Pen: Plisson (1/1) 15'; Fillol (1/2) 23'; Porical (1/1) 80'; Drop: Plisson (1/2) 69'

Recreation Ground, Bath
Attendance: 11,155
Referee: Nigel Owens (Wales)

=== Semi-finals ===
26 April 2013
21:00

Perpignan (France)	22–25	(France) Stade Français
Try: Guirado 10' m Hook 22' m Pen: Hook (4/5) 29', 43', 47', 66'	Report	Try: Lyons 44' c Con: Porical (1/1); Pen: Porical (6/7) 8', 26', 35', 52', 73', 76'

Stade Aimé Giral, Perpignan
Attendance: 12,242
Referee: George Clancy (Ireland)

27 April 2013
14:30

Leinster (Ireland)	44–16	(France) Biarritz
Try: Heaslip (2) 3' c, 40' c J. Sexton 38' c Nacewa 49' c O'Driscoll 63' c Con: J. Sexton (3/3); Madigan (2/2); Pen: J. Sexton (2/2) 27', 45'; Madigan (1/1) 55'	Report	Try: Héguy 67' c Con: Yachvili (1/1); Pen: Yachvili (3/3) 18', 23', 36'

RDS Arena, Dublin
Attendance: 18,500
Referee: Wayne Barnes (England)

=== Final ===
17 May 2013
20:00 IST

Leinster (Ireland)	34–13	(France) Stade Français
Try: Madigan 2' c Cronin 19' c R. Kearney 27' c Healy 78' c Con: J. Sexton (4/4); Pen: J. Sexton (2/2) 53', 62'	Report	Try: Sinzelle 65' c Con: Plisson (1/1); Pen: Porical (2/2) 25', 40'

RDS Arena, Dublin
Attendance: 20,396
Referee: Nigel Owens (Wales)

- Under European Rugby Cup rules, the winner of the Challenge Cup was automatically entered into the following season's Heineken Cup. If the Challenge Cup winner had already domestically qualified, the Cup winner's berth passed to another team from its country. As Leinster qualified for the 2013–14 Heineken Cup through their performance in the Pro 12, Connacht qualified for the Heineken Cup.

== See also ==
- 2012–13 Heineken Cup
