= Declan Cusack =

Irish rugby union player

- Born: 28 April 1988 (age 38) Limerick, Ireland
- Height: 1.83 m (6 ft 0 in)
- Weight: 92 kg (14.5 st; 203 lb)

Rugby union career
- Position(s): Fly-Half, Centre
Senior career
Years	Team	Apps	(Points)
2010–2012	Munster	5	(2)
2012–2013	Gernika	6	(50)
2013–2015	Plymouth	37	(250)
2015–2019	Doncaster	64	(149)
2018	→ Leicester Tigers (loan)	1	(0)
2019–	York	33	(204)
- Correct as of 15 May 2020
Coaching career
- Years: Team
- 2018–2019: Doncaster Knights (coach)
- 2019–: York (player-coach)

Declan Cusack (born 28 April 1988) is an Irish rugby union player, who is currently head coach at English National 2 North club Hull. He normally plays as a fly-half but has occasionally played as a centre.

== Munster ==
He made his debut for Munster against Connacht on 18 April 2010, starting at fly-half. He was part of the Munster A team that lost to Cornish Pirates in the final of 2009–10 British and Irish Cup in May 2010. On 27 April 2012, Cusack came off the bench for Munster A in their 31–12 2011–12 British and Irish Cup Final victory against Cross Keys. On 5 May 2012, Cusack came off the bench for Munster in the last league fixture of the 2011–12 season against Ulster and scored his first points for the province, a conversion of Munster's fourth try. It was announced on 3 May 2012 that Cusack would leave Munster at the end of the 2011–12 season.

== Gernika RT ==
Cusack made six starts for Basque side Gernika RT in the 2012–13 European Challenge Cup, scoring 50 points.

== Plymouth Albion ==
He recently signed a short-term contract with RFU Championship side Plymouth Albion until the end of the 2012–13 season. He also joined the Plymouth squad for the 2013–14 season.

== Doncaster ==
Cusack joined another RFU Championship side, Doncaster R.F.C, at the beginning of the 2015–16 season. Whilst at Doncaster, Cusack played a single match on loan to Leicester Tigers during the 2017–18 Anglo-Welsh Cup. He moved on to become a player-coach at York RUFC at the end of the 2018–2019 season.

== York ==
Having previously coached at Doncaster, Cusack joined York as a player-coach ahead of the 2019–20 season. York won North 1 East in the 2019–20 season.
