= Matthieu Ugalde =

- Born: Matthieu Ugalde; 10 June 1992 (age 34)
- Height: 1.81 m (5 ft 11 in)
- Weight: 85 kg (13 st 5 lb)

Rugby union career
- Position: Centre
Senior career
Years	Team	Apps	(Points)
2011-2015	Bayonne	48	(90)
2015-2018	Brive	74	(45)
2018-	FC Grenoble	3	(5)
- Correct as of 30 January 2015

Matthieu Ugalde (born 10 June 1992) is a French professional rugby union player. He currently plays for Grenoble in the Top 14 having formerly played for Bayonne.
