= Clément Darbo =

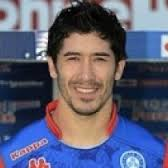
- Clément Darbo
- Born: 4 June 1986 (age 40) Lembeye, France
- Height: 1.75 m (5 ft 9 in)
- Weight: 80 kg (12 st 8 lb)

Rugby union career
- Position: Scrum-half
Senior career
Years	Team	Apps	(Points)
2005–2011	Pau	94	(375)
2011–2013	Grenoble	32	(237)
2013–2017	Agen	88	(241)
2017–2018	Montauban	23	(55)
2018–	Provence	19	(76)
- Correct as of 1 September 2019

Clément Darbo (born 13 January 1986) is a French rugby union player. His position is scrum-half and he currently plays for Provence Rugby in the Rugby Pro D2. He began his career with Pau before moving to FC Grenoble in 2011.
