= Edoardo Candiago =

Italian rugby union player

Edoardo Candiago (born 6 August 1978) is an Italian rugby union player. He plays as a flanker.

He played more recently for Rugby Calvisano (2004/05-2005/06), Venezia Mestre Rugby FC (2007/08-2009/10) and for Mogliano, since 2010/11.
