= Michael Wiringi =

Mike Wiringi
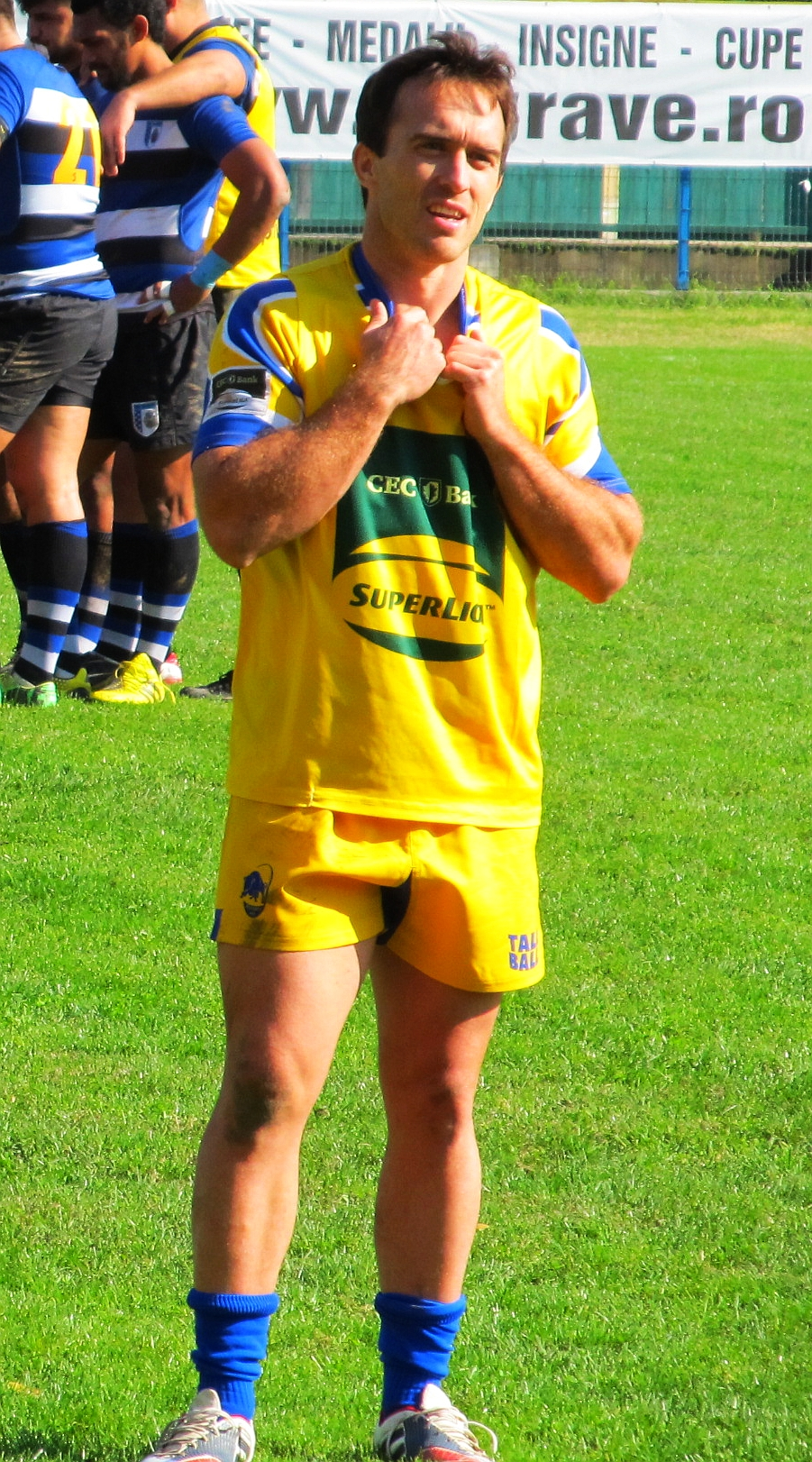
- Wiringi during a SuperLiga match in 2015
- Full name: Michael Wiringi
- Born: 1 August 1985 (age 41) Hāwera, New Zealand

Rugby union career
Provincial / State sides
Years	Team	Apps	(Points)
- Baia Mare
International career
Years	Team	Apps	(Points)
2015–	Romania	3	
- Correct as of 28 October 2015

Michael Wiringi (born 1 August 1985 in Hāwera) is a New Zealand-born Romanian rugby union player. He plays as a fly-half.

He now plays for Baia Mare and Romania. Wiringi made his debut for the Romania in 2015 and was part of the squad at the 2015 Rugby World Cup.
