= Giacomo Bernini =

Italian rugby union player

- Full name: Giacomo Bernini
- Born: 22 October 1989 (age 37) Livorno, Italy
- Height: 1.93 m (6 ft 4 in)
- Weight: 107 kg (16 st 12 lb; 236 lb)

Rugby union career
- Position(s): Number 8, Flanker
- Current team: Verona
Youth career
- Lions Amaranto
- Livorno 1931
Senior career
Years	Team	Apps	(Points)
2010–2011	Amatori Rugby San Donà	22	(30)
2011–2014	Cavalieri Prato	70	(100)
2014	→Zebre	1	(0)
2014−2015	Amatori Rugby San Donà	18	(15)
2015	→Zebre	2	(0)
2015−2016	Rovigo Delta	19	(20)
2016−2018	Petrarca	19	(10)
2018−	Verona	13	(5)
- Correct as of 11 May 2019
International career
Years	Team	Apps	(Points)
2008	Italy Under 20	2	(0)
- Correct as of 7 June 2014

Giacomo Bernini (born 22 October 1989) is an Italian rugby union player who plays as a variety of positions. He currently plays for Verona.

Born and raised in Livorno between Lions and Amaranto Livorno, in 2010 season he moved to Amatori Rugby San Donà, playing in Serie A1. In 2011, Giacomo joined top-flight side Prato. That season he won the team's award of "Best Newcomer". In January 2014, he trained with Zebre as a permit player. In June 2014, it was announced that he joined Amatori Rugby San Donà .

== external list ==
- SARL It's rugby. "Rugby - Player statistics Bernini Giacomo - club stats". itsrugby.co.uk.
- "Giacomo Bernini | Rugby Union | Players and Officials | ESPN Scrum". espn.co.uk.
