= Guy Mercer =

English rugby union player

- Born: 12 December 1989 (age 36) Bristol, England
- Height: 1.81 m (5 ft 11 1/2 in)
- Weight: 100 kg (16 st; 220 lb)
- School: King Edward's School

Rugby union career
- Position: Flanker
- Current team: Ospreys
Senior career
Years	Team	Apps	(Points)
2010–	Bath	123	(25)
2017–18	→ Ospreys (loan)	16	(0)
- Correct as of 30 August 2017
International career
Years	Team	Apps	(Points)
- England U16

Guy Mercer (born 12 December 1989) is a former English rugby union player for Bath in the Aviva Premiership, who last played on loan to Welsh Pro14 side Ospreys. His position of choice was flanker. Mercer left Bath ahead of the 2018–19 season after making 123 senior appearances for the club; he had spent the preceding season on loan with Ospreys, making 16 appearances.

== Career ==
=== Bath ===
Mercer was promoted from the academy in the 2009–2010 season. He was named man-of-the-match in Bath's Aviva Premiership loss to Wasps in 2010 and was named club captain in 2016.

=== Ospreys ===
In August 2017, Mercer joined Welsh Pro14 side Ospreys on a season-long loan deal, joining in time for the opening round of the 2017–18 Pro14 season.
