= Tom Holmes (rugby union) =

English rugby union player

- Born: 5 January 1990 (age 36) Manchester, England
- Height: 193 cm (6 ft 4 in)
- Weight: 119 kg (18 st 10 lb)
- School: Sandbach School

Rugby union career
- Position: Lock
- Current team: Nottingham RFC
Senior career
| Years | Team | Apps | (Points) |
| 2007–2014 | Sale Sharks | 19 | (0) |
| 2014–2016 | Rotherham Titans | | |
| 2016- | Nottingham | | |
- Correct as of 3 June 2013
International career
| Years | Team | Apps | (Points) |
- England U18

Tom Holmes (born 5 January 1990) is an English rugby union player for Nottingham RFC in the RFU Championship where he is club captain. He signed from the Rotherham Titans in 2016. He previously played for Sale Sharks. He plays as a lock.

As well as his playing commitments, Holmes is the forwards coach at Long Eaton RFC

Born in Manchester, Holmes was scouted by Sale Sharks at 16. He played for England each year until Under 20 level when a severe ankle injury left him out of action for six months. Holmes was dropped from Sale and played for Sedgley Park before re-signing for Sale in 2013.

On 1 May 2014, Holmes signed a permanent deal with Rotherham Titans who compete in the RFU Championship.
