= Matt Cornwell =

- Born: 16 January 1985 (age 41) Leicester, England
- Height: 1.85 m (6 ft 1 in)
- Weight: 94 kg (14 st 11 lb)

Rugby union career
- Position(s): Centre, Fullback
Senior career
Years	Team	Apps	(Points)
2004–2008	Leicester Tigers	41	(20)
2008–2010	Exeter Chiefs		
2010–2011	Northampton Saints		
2011–2012	Mogliano		
2012–2013	Leicester Tigers		
2013–2014	Mogliano		
2014–2015	Rugby San Donà		

Matt Cornwell (born 16 January 1985 in Leicester, England) is a former English rugby union player. He played as a fullback, fly-half and centre.

Learning his early rugby at Syston RFC and Oakham School, Cornwell played in two Daily Mail Cup Final victories at Twickenham and joined Leicester Tigers Academy as an under-16.

He progressed to the senior team, making 42 appearances in four seasons and captained the Development XV to a Premiership 'A' League title in 2005/06.

He moved on to play at the Exeter Chiefs followed by spells at the Northampton Saints and in Italy playing for Mogliano in the National Championship of Excellence, in 2011–12. He returned to Leicester Tigers for the 2012–13 season. On 28 March 2013, Cornwell rejoined Mogliano for the 2013/14 season.

Cornwell captained England Under-21s to a Six Nations Grand Slam in 2006 and in the Junior World Cup in France, and led a young Tigers squad in the JP Morgan Premiership 7s Series in summer of 2012.
