= Abdellatif Boutaty =

Moroccan rugby union footballer

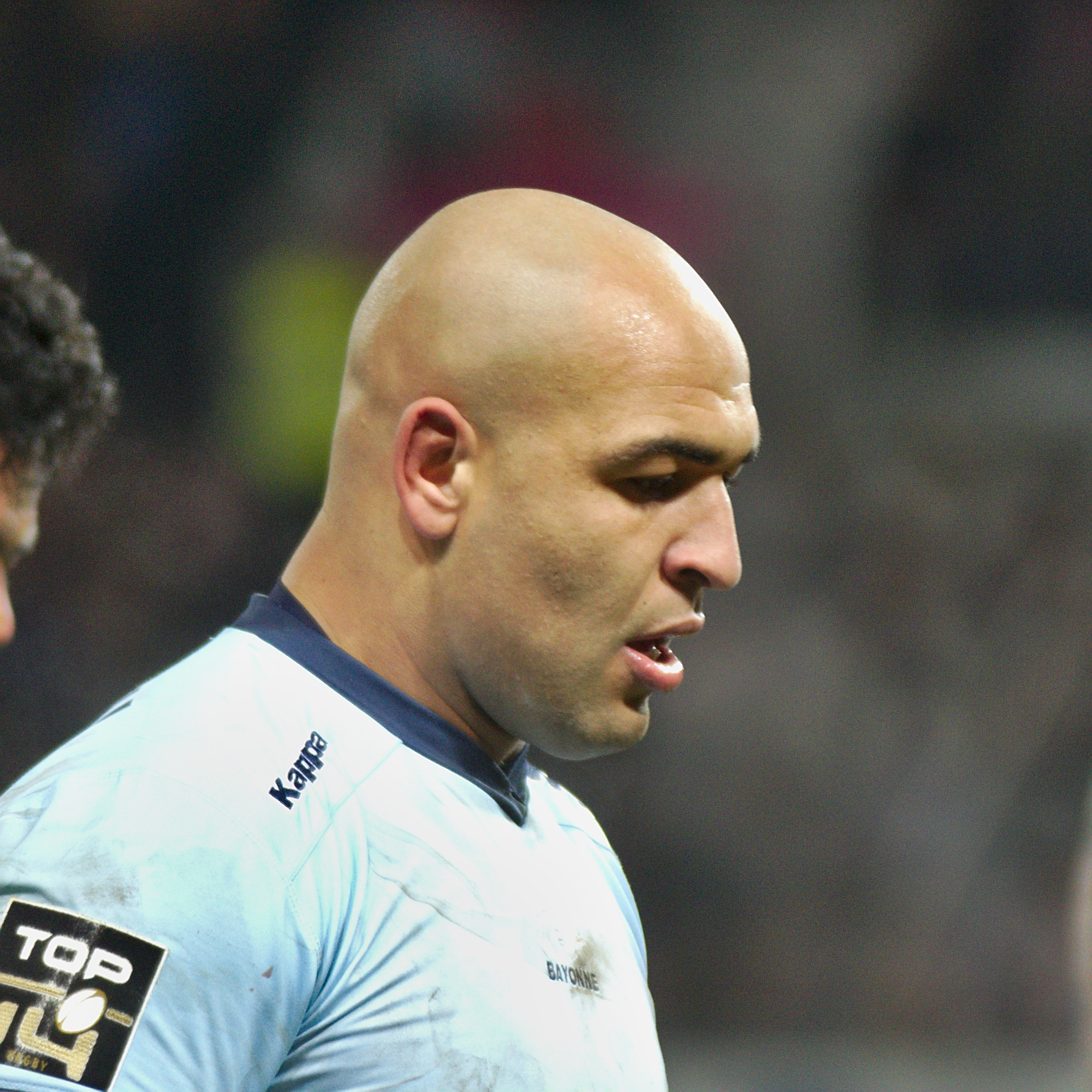
- Born: June 4, 1983 (age 43) Morocco
- Height: 1.92 m (6 ft 3 1/2 in)
- Weight: 114 kg (251 lb)

Rugby union career
- Position: Lock
Senior career
Years	Team	Apps	(Points)
2004-2005	Stade Toulousain	1	(0)
2006-2007	Section Paloise	6	(0)
2007-2008	Blagnac SCR	22	(15)
2008-2010	US Montauban	42	(10)
2010-2014	Aviron Bayonnais	66	(25)
2014-2016	Section Paloise	36	(25)
2017-2018	Stade Français	11	(0)
2018-2019	Aviron Bayonnais	24	(5)
International career
Years	Team	Apps	(Points)
2004-2017	Morocco	63	(0)

Abdellatif Boutaty (born 4 June 1983) is a former Moroccan rugby union footballer. He played as a lock. He was nicknamed "The Tiger of Atlas" (Le Tigre de l'Atlas).

== Club career ==
Boutaty played for the Moroccan amateur team of COC, in Casablanca, moving then to Vallée du Girou, in Toulouse, France. He then was assigned to his first major team, Stade Toulousain, in 2004/05. Boutaty joined Section Paloise for the season of 2006–07, moving then to Blagnac SCR, where he spent an entire season. He played for US Montauban, from 2008-09 to 2009-10. He moved to Aviron Bayonnais for the season 2010-11 Top 14 season, where he would play until 2013/14. He played for Section Paloise from 2014/15 to 2015/16. In January 2017, he joined Stade Français. He finished his career at Aviron Bayonnais in 2018/19. He come out of his retirement to play for Soyaux Angoulême XV Charente in 2020/21, in the Pro D2. He finished his career once again in 2021, aged 38 years old.

== International statistics ==
Boutaty was one of the best players for Morocco, having won the title of African Champion, in 2005. He was also in the Moroccan side that narrowly lost the repechage play-off for a place at the 2007 Rugby World Cup, getting beat by Portugal.
