= Francis Fainifo =

New Zealand rugby union player (born 1983)

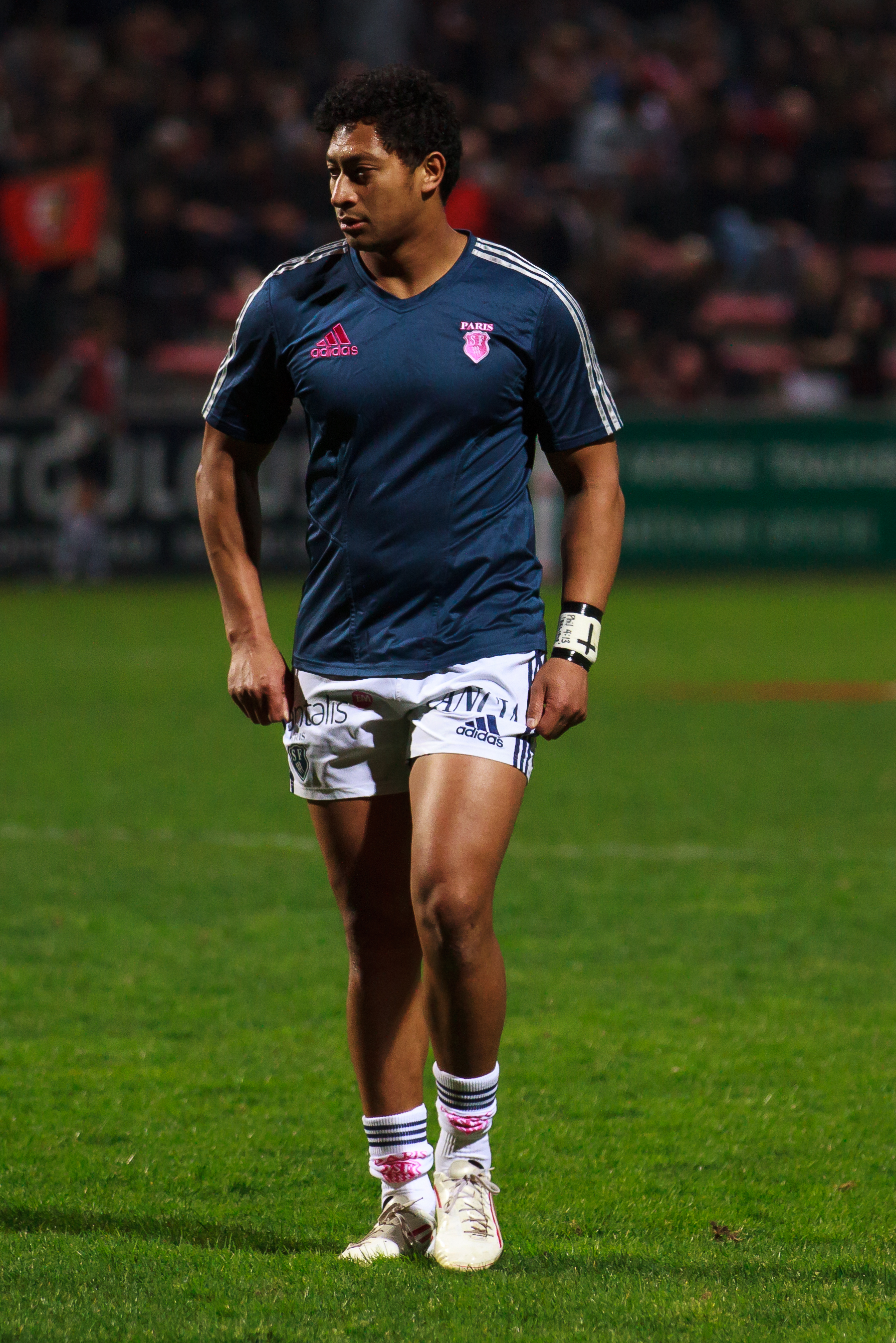
- Born: Francis Poutoa Fainifo; 25 November 1983 (age 42) Auckland, New Zealand
- Height: 1.90 m (6 ft 3 in)
- Weight: 97 kg (15 st 4 lb)
- University: University of New England where he completed a Bachelor of Commerce 2006

Rugby union career
- Position: Wing
Senior career
Years	Team	Apps	(Points)
2007	Canberra Vikings	5	(10)
2011–13	Stade Français	33	(65)
2014−15	RC Narbonne	12	(0)
2015	Canberra Vikings	7	(30)
- Correct as of 3 November 2015
Super Rugby
Years	Team	Apps	(Points)
2007–11	Brumbies	48	(40)
- Correct as of 3 November 2015

Francis Fainifo (born 25 November 1983) is a former professional rugby union player for Stade Français in the Top 14. He signed for the Brumbies in the Super Rugby competition in 2011. He played on the wing. He was born in Auckland, New Zealand, but has played international rugby with Australia A.

Fainifo was educated at Eagle Vale High School, a notable rugby league school in Sydney's South West. Fainifo played both rugby union and league, playing for the Campbelltown Harlequins (Union) & Campbelltown City Kangaroos (League) respectively.
