= Nicky Robinson (rugby union) =

Wales international rugby union footballer

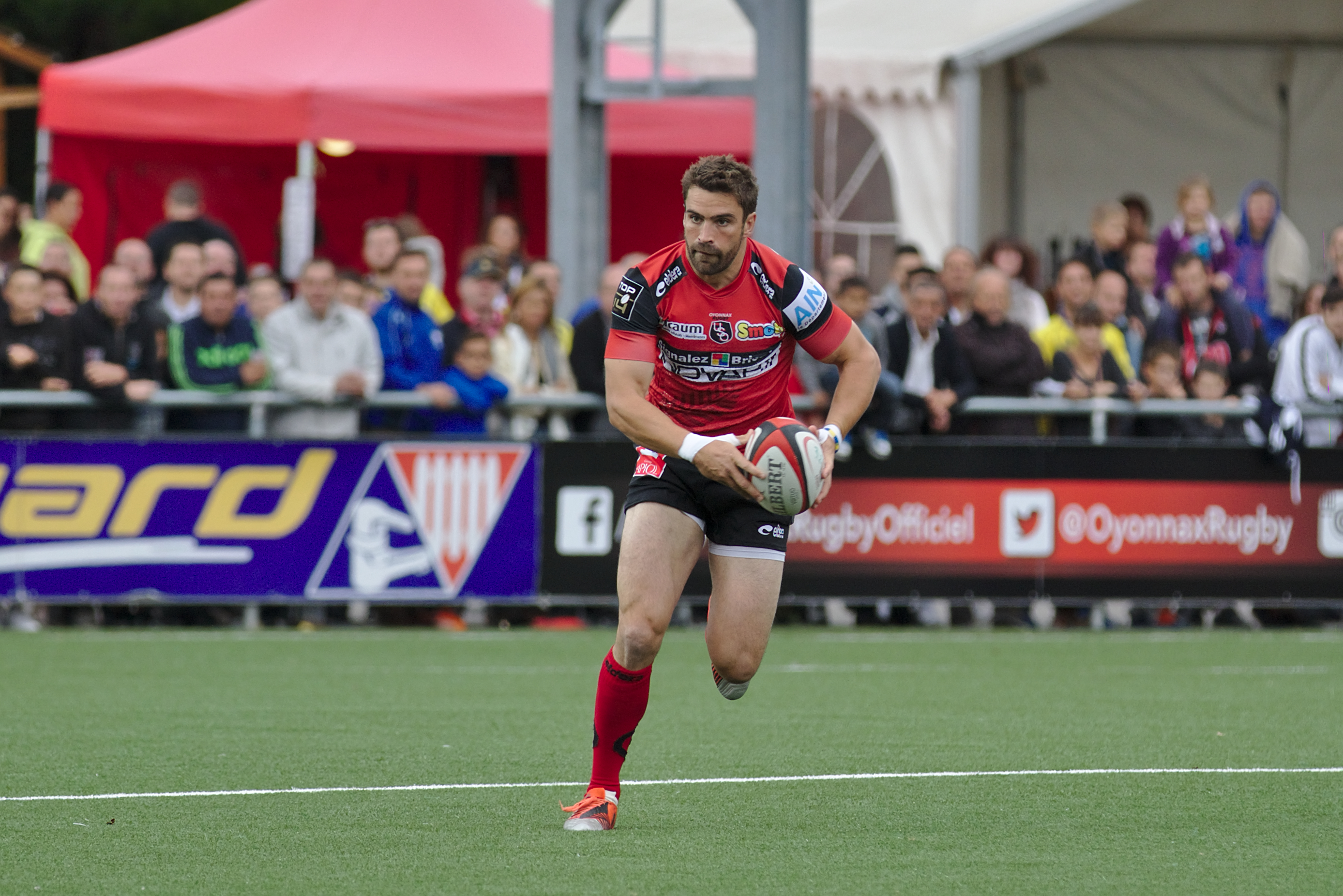
- Born: Nicholas John Robinson; 3 January 1982 (age 44) Cardiff, Wales
- Height: 1.85 m (6 ft 1 in)
- Weight: 93 kg (14 st 9 lb)
- Notable relative: Jamie Robinson (brother)

Rugby union career
- Position: Fly-half
Senior career
Years	Team	Apps	(Points)
2001-2003	Cardiff RFC	49	(367)
2003-2009	Cardiff Blues	125	(666)
2009-2011	Gloucester	58	(518)
2011-2013	London Wasps	50	(384)
2013-2015	Bristol	38	(218)
2015-2016	Oyonnax	21	(175)
2016-2017	Cardiff Blues	1	(4)
- Correct as of 3 December 2016
International career
Years	Team	Apps	(Points)
2003–2009	Wales	13	(42)

Nicholas John Robinson (born 3 January 1982 in Cardiff) is a former Wales international rugby union player who played at fly-half.

He is the younger brother of Jamie Robinson. Both were educated at Ysgol Glantaf which has educated several Wales internationals and Cardiff-based players, including Jamie Roberts. Nicky Robinson speaks Welsh fluently.

Nick was one of European rugby's leading fly-halves and he has amassed nearly 1,500 points to date in club rugby for his four professional sides - Cardiff Blues, Gloucester, Wasps & Bristol.

A left-footed fly-half, Nick was famous for his running game.

In May 2009 he joined Gloucester Rugby from Cardiff Blues on a three-year contract. He played a central role as Cardiff Blues thrashed Gloucester in the Anglo-Welsh Cup Final at Twickenham earlier that year.

In his two seasons at Gloucester Nick was a model of consistency for the English Premiership side, making 60 appearances and scoring in excess of 500 points as Gloucester reached the Anglo-Welsh Cup Final in 2010 (where they lost to Northampton Saints), the Anglo-Welsh Cup Final again in 2011 - where Nick was named man-of-the-match as Gloucester overcame Newcastle Falcons - and the Premiership play-off semi-finals, where a late try from Nick wasn't enough as Gloucester went down 12–10 to eventual winners Saracens.

In February 2011 it was announced he would be joining London Wasps from Gloucester Rugby on a two-year contract, teaming up again with former Cardiff Blues coach Dai Young.

Despite 2011/2012 being a difficult season for Wasps off the field, on it Nick was a virtual ever-present in the starting line-up, scoring 230 points in 25 appearances as the club reached the quarter-finals of the European Challenge Cup.

On 21 February 2013, Robinson signed for Bristol Rugby in the RFU Championship and for the 2013–14 season.

On 29 January 2015, it was announced Robinson would join French Top 14 side Oyonnax on a three-year deal from the 2015–16 season.

Robinson retired from playing in July 2016, but re-signed for Cardiff Blues in November of the same year.

In August 2017 it was announced that Robinson would remain at Cardiff Blues in a coaching capacity, taking on the role of kicking coach alongside former Blues scrum half Richie Rees, who would be working as backs coach.

In April 2018 Robinson married Lynsey Dalglish the daughter of Kenny Dalglish.
