= Florian Cazenave =

French rugby union player

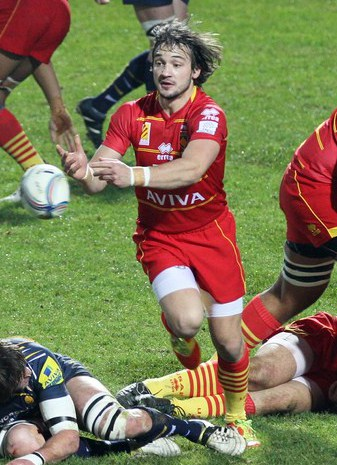
- Born: 4 June 1989 (age 37) Tarbes, France
- Height: 1.82 m (5 ft 11 1/2 in)
- Weight: 80 kg (12 st 8 lb)

Rugby union career
- Position: Scrum-half
Senior career
Years	Team	Apps	(Points)
2008–2014	Perpignan	74	(15)
2016–2017	Valorugby Emilia	13	(5)
2017–2018	Brive	26	(5)
2018–	Vannes	0	(0)
- Correct as of 27 December 2018

Florian Cazenave (born 30 December 1989 in Tarbes) is a French rugby union player. His position is Scrum-half and he currently plays for Vannes in the Pro D2.

== Honours ==
- Top 14 Champion – 2008–09
