= Charlie Davies (rugby union) =

English rugby union player

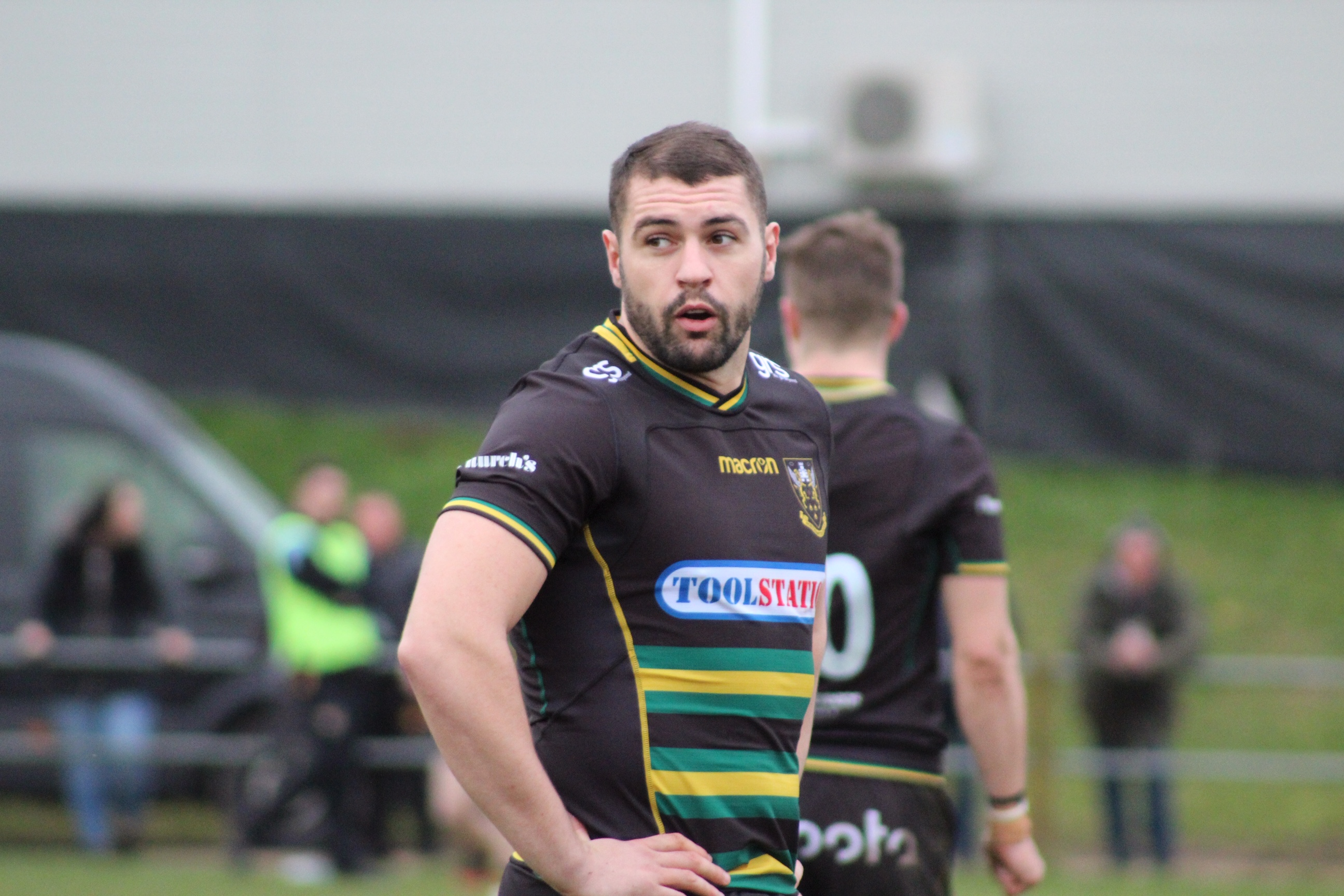
- Born: Charlie Davies; 23 May 1990 (age 36) Shropshire, England
- Height: 1.86 m (6 ft 1 in)
- Weight: 97 kg (15 st 4 lb)
- School: Birkdale School

Rugby union career
- Position: Scrum half
Senior career
Years	Team	Apps	(Points)
2007–2009	Nottingham	11	(10)
2009–2010	Stade Français	4	(0)
2010–	Wasps	24	(10)
2010	Nottingham(loan)	5	(0)
2015-2018	Dragons	54	(15)
2018-	Northampton Saints		
- Correct as of 22 June 2018
International career
Years	Team	Apps	(Points)
2010	England U20	5	(0)

Charlie Davies (born 23 May 1990) is an English rugby union scrum half who played for the Dragons, having joined from Wasps ahead of the 2015-16 season. Davies began his professional career at Nottingham RFC in the RFU Championship, making his debut in the 2007–2008 season. In June 2009 he signed for French rugby giants Stade Français and made five first team appearances for the club in the Top 14. Whilst at Stade Français, Davies was also called up to the England U20 national side and made one substitute appearance for them during the 2010 U20 Six Nations. In May 2010 it was announced Davies had signed for Aviva Premiership side Wasps. Davies was also named in the England U20 squad for the IRB Junior World Championship held in Argentina during June 2010, starting in the 36-21 group stage victory over Ireland and loss to Australia. He was also a replacement in the matches against Argentina and South Africa.

Davies made his Aviva Premiership debut as a replacement on 10 September 2010 in a 29–17 defeat to Newcastle Falcons. During his debut season at Wasps Davies also played a number of games for his original senior club Nottingham on loan.

He was released by the Dragons regional team at the end of the 2017-18 season.

On 7 June 2018, it was announced that Davies has signed for the English Premiership side Northampton Saints ahead of the 2018-2019 season.
