= Jean-François Montauriol =

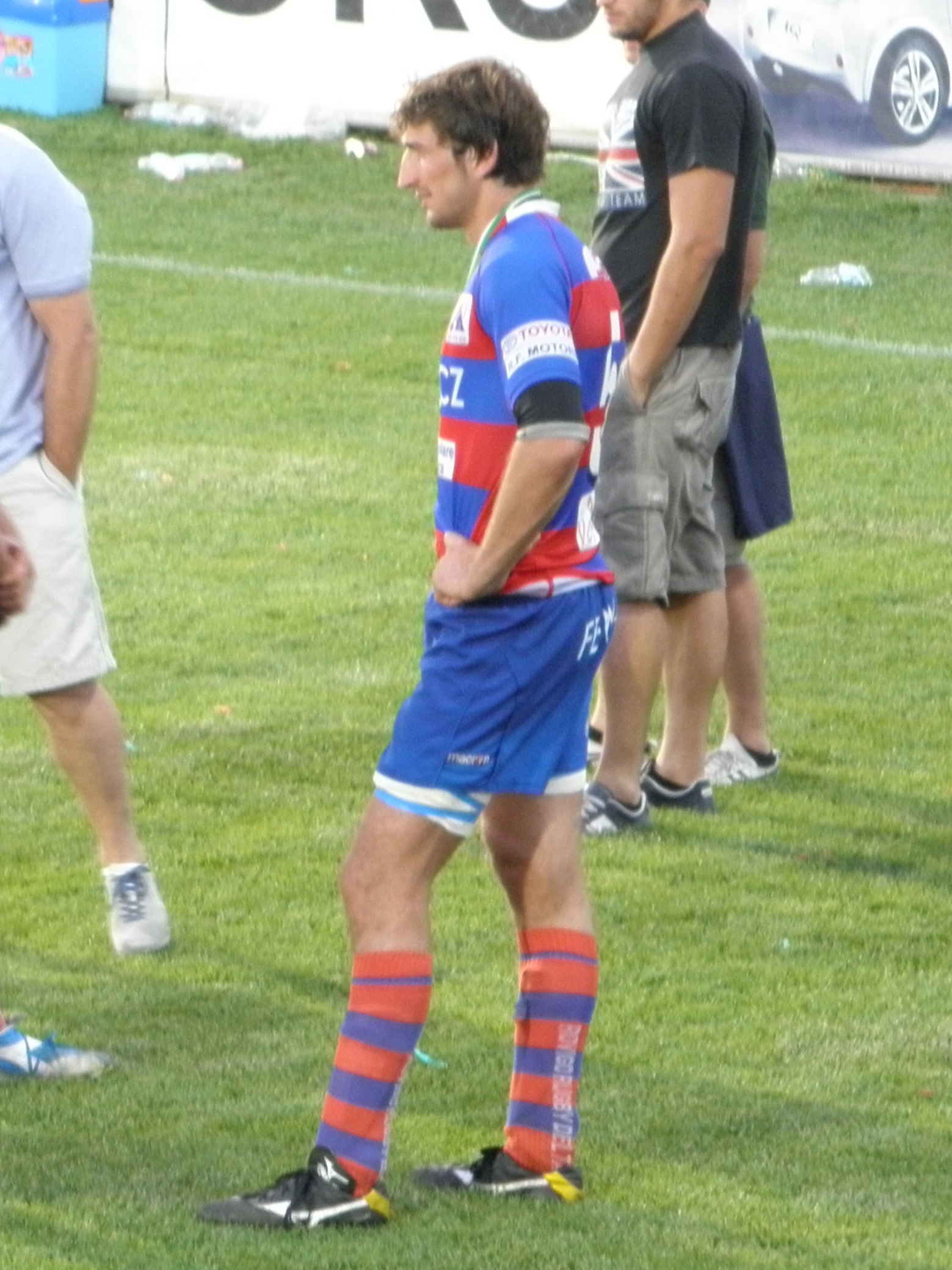
- Born: Jean-François Montauriol; 21 March 1983 (age 43) Toulouse, France
- Height: 1.99 m (6 ft 6 in)
- Weight: 103 kg (227 lb; 16.2 st)

Rugby union career
- Position: Back Row or Second Row
Senior career
Years	Team	Apps	(Points)
2000–2008	Toulouse	26	(15)
2008–2010	Venezia	20	(5)
2010–2015	Rovigo	95	(100)
2015–2017	Benetton Treviso	26	(5)
2017	I Medicei	7	(5)
2018−2019	Verona	10	(10)
International career
Years	Team	Apps	(Points)
2009	Italy	2	(0)

Jean-François Montauriol (born 21 March 1983) is a former professional rugby union player. His usual position was in the back row, but he could also play as a lock. Born in Toulouse, France, he began his career at his hometown club Stade Toulousain but was never a regular first-XV player. He moved to Venezia before the start of the 2008–09 season, where his performances were rewarded with a call-up to the Italy squad for the match against England in the 2009 Six Nations Championship. He came on as a replacement for the final four minutes of the game at Twickenham, winning his first cap. He was also selected on Italy's 2009 summer tour to Australia and New Zealand. He won his second cap against Australia in Melbourne on this tour.
