= Michael Claassens =

South African rugby union footballer

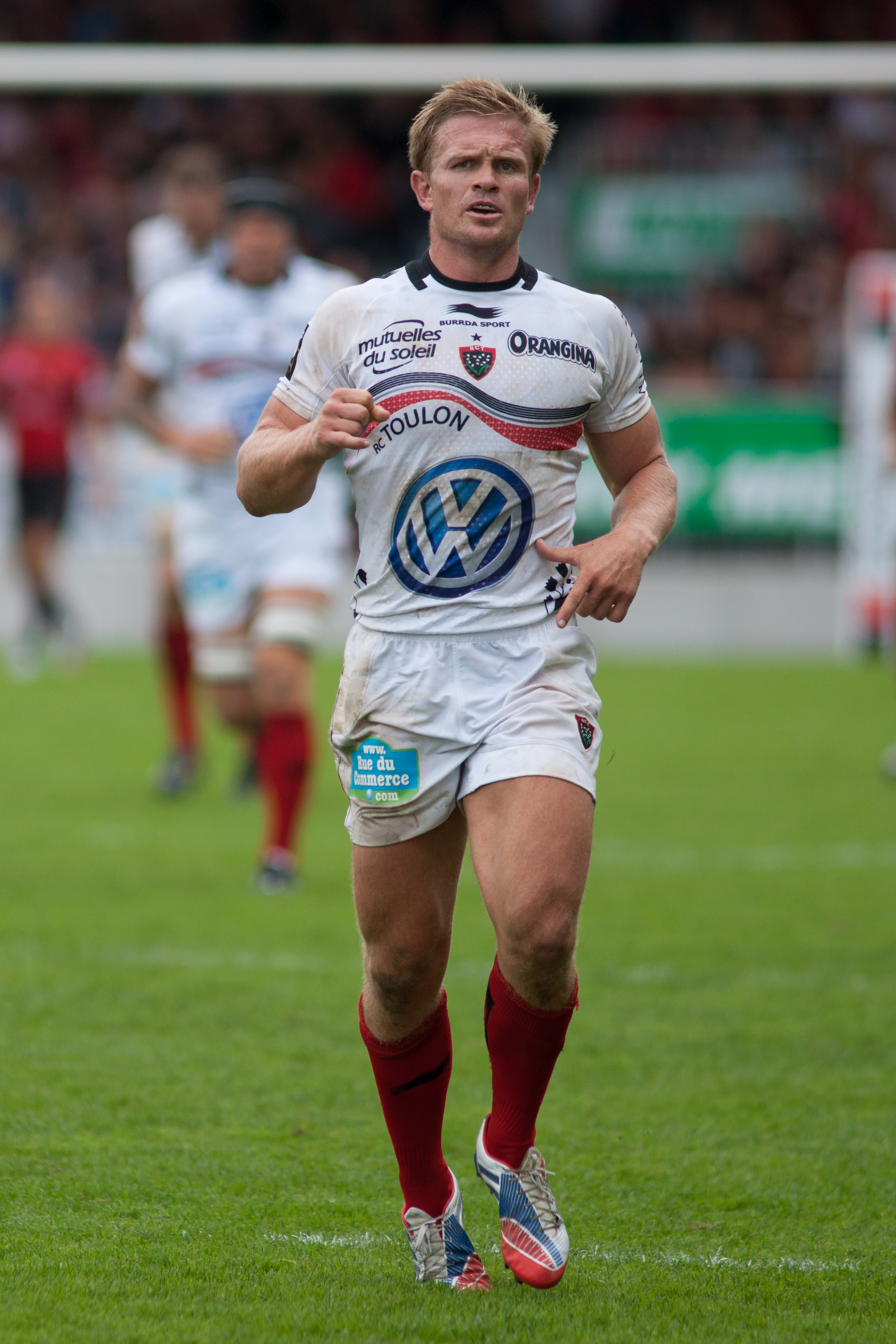
- Born: 28 October 1982 (age 44) Kroonstad, South Africa
- Height: 1.78 m (5 ft 10 in)
- Weight: 89 kg (14 st 0 lb; 196 lb)
- Notable relative: Errie Claassens

Rugby union career
- Position: Scrum half
Senior career
Years	Team	Apps	(Points)
2003–2006	Free State Cheetahs	64	(80)
2005	Cats	9	(0)
2006–2007	Cheetahs	20	(0)
2007–2013	Bath	164	(155)
2013–2015	Toulon	37	(0)
2015–2017	Sharks (Currie Cup)	27	(15)
2016–2017	Sharks	29	(5)
2017–2018	Sharks XV	2	(0)
2003–2018	Total	352	(255)
- Correct as of 30 May 2018
International career
Years	Team	Apps	(Points)
2003	South Africa Under-21	1	(5)
2004	South Africa 'A'		
2004–2007	South Africa	8	(0)
2008	Barbarians	2	(0)
- Correct as of 7 April 2018

Michael Claassens (born 28 October 1982 in Kroonstad, Free State) is a former South African rugby union player that played professional rugby between 2003 and 2018. He made in excess of 350 senior appearances, including eight test matches for the South Africa national team.

He made his first class debut in 2003 for the Free State Cheetahs, making 64 appearances for the Bloemfontein-based side between 2003 and 2006. He also played Super Rugby for the Cats in 2005 and the Cheetahs in 2006 and 2007. He joined Bath in the Premiership in England for the 2007–08 season, where he stayed for six seasons. He then had two seasons at Toulon in the Top 14 before returning to South Africa to finish his career at the Durban-based Sharks.

He is the brother of Errie Claassens, also a professional rugby union player.

== Honours ==
Free State Cheetahs

- Currie Cup: 2005

Bath

- European Challenge Cup: 2007–2008

Toulon

- Heineken Cup European Champions: 2014
- Top 14 French League : 2014
