= Alex Davies (rugby union) =

- Born: 20 June 1986 (age 40) Chester, England
- Height: 1.73 m (5 ft 8 in)
- Weight: 81 kg (12 st 11 lb; 179 lb)

Rugby union career
- Position: Fly-half / Scrum-half/coach
Senior career
Years	Team	Apps	(Points)
2011–2015	London Welsh	69	(488)
2018–2020	Bath Rugby	0	(0)
2020–	Rosslyn Park		
- Correct as of 10 September 2018

Alex Davies (born 20 June 1986) is an English rugby union player and coach at Rosslyn Park. Davies can play at either fly half or scrum half.

Davies set points records for Plymouth Albion kicking a record-breaking seven penalties in Plymouth’s 35-24 relegation play-off victory over Birmingham & Solihull R.F.C. and previously in the season equalled the south coast club’s record for most points in a league match by scoring 26 points against the same opposition at Damson Park before joining London Welsh in July 2011.

Davies played for London Welsh for four years, twice winning promotion to the Premiership and making thirty six Guinness Premiership appearances before spending two years at Ealing Trailfinders and two at Yorkshire Carnegie. In May 2018 Davies was confirmed as signing for Bath.

Davies left Bath in July 2020 to become a player coach at Rosslyn Park in National League 1.
