= Jérôme Schuster =

French rugby union player (born 1985)

- Born: 29 June 1985 (age 41) Perpignan, France
- Height: 1.81 m (5 ft 11 1/2 in)
- Weight: 117 kg (18 st 6 lb)

Rugby union career
- Position: Loosehead prop
Senior career
Years	Team	Apps	(Points)
2006–2013	Perpignan	56	(5)
2013–2014	Leicester Tigers		
2014–2016	Tarbes		
2016–2018	Bayonne		
2018–	Anglet		
International career
Years	Team	Apps	(Points)
2010	France	2	(0)

Jérôme Schuster (born 29 June 1985 in Perpignan) is a professional French rugby union prop currently playing for Tarbes in the Pro D2. He made his international debut for France against Fiji in November 2010. He can play on both sides of the scrum, but usually plays at loosehead.

On 17 May 2013, Schuster signed with the Leicester Tigers for the 2013-14 season. On 22 May 2014, Schuster returned to France as he signed for Tarbes, who compete in the Pro D2.
