= Steffan Jones (rugby union) =

- Born: Steffan Jones; 22 November 1990 (age 35) Caerphilly, Wales
- Height: 184 cm (6 ft 0 in)
- Weight: 85 kg (13 st 5 lb)
- School: Ysgol Gyfun Cwm Rhymni

Rugby union career
- Position: Fly-half
- Current team: Bargoed RFC
Senior career
| Years | Team | Apps | (Points) |
| 2010–2015 | Newport Gwent Dragons | 39 | (203) |
| 2015- | Bedford Blues | 0 | (0) |

Steffan Jones (born 22 November 1990) is a Welsh rugby union player for Bedwas RFC. He previously played for Cross Keys RFC and the Newport Gwent Dragons regional team before moving to Bedford Blues . He is a Wales Sevens international.

Jones was born in Caerfili and attended Ysgol Gyfun Cwm Rhymni and SGS College. He previously played for Bargoed RFC, Cardiff RFC and Penallta RFC (Youth). A fly-half, Jones made his debut for Newport Gwent Dragons against Gloucester 4 November 2010. He scored his first try on his Magners League debut on 29 April 2011 against Cardiff Blues. Jones joined Bedford Blues on loan for the start of the 2014–15 season and in January 2015 made the move on a permanent basis.
