= Max Stelling =

English rugby union player

- Born: January 14, 1994 (age 32) Birmingham, England
- Height: 6 ft 4 in (193 cm)
- Weight: 222 lb (101 kg)

Rugby union career
- Position: Centre
Senior career
Years	Team	Apps	(Points)
- Hino Red Dolphins
2013-2014	Worcester Warriors	41	(125)

Maxwell Joseph "Max" Stelling is a semi-professional rugby union player who was born in Birmingham, England on 14 January 1994.

He plays for the Worcester Warriors as a centre. Stelling attended Old Swinford Hospital in Stourbridge, and was a member of their 1st XV squad that lost the Daily Mail cup final in 2012 during which he bounced the Dulwich 13 and assisted in the only try of the game.

He has 41 caps for Worcester Warriors and has scored 125 points in his appearances.
