= Jack Wallace (rugby union) =

English rugby union player

Jack Wallace is an English rugby union player. He plays fullback and wing. He currently plays for Richmond RFC in the Greene King IPA Championship. He previously played for Wasps RFC.

He was released by Bristol in April 2018, Richmond announcing his arrival in June of that year.
