= Ieuan Jones =

Welsh rugby union footballer

- Born: Ieuan Jones; 22 July 1993 (age 33) Blackwood, Wales
- Height: 190 cm (6 ft 3 in)
- Weight: 120 kg (18 st 13 lb)

Rugby union career
- Current team: Cardiff Blues
Senior career
Years	Team	Apps	(Points)
2012-2014	NG Dragons	18	(20)
2014-	Cardiff Blues	0	(0)
- Correct as of 3 May 2012
International career
Years	Team	Apps	(Points)
2011-	Wales U20	1	(0)
- Correct as of 3 May 2012

Ieuan Jones (born 22 July 1993) is a Welsh rugby union player. A back row forward he played for Newport Gwent Dragons before joining Cardiff Blues at the end of the 2013–14 season.

== International ==
In April 2012 he was named in the Wales Under-20 squad for the Junior World Cup in South Africa.

In January 2013 he was selected in the Wales Under 20 squad for the 2013 Under 20 Six Nations Championship.
