= George Porter (rugby union) =

- Born: 15 May 1989 (age 37) Gloucester, England
- Height: 1.83 m (6 ft 0 in)
- Weight: 112 kg (17 st 9 lb)

Rugby union career
- Current team: Worcester Warriors
Senior career
Years	Team	Apps	(Points)
2009–2011	Plymouth Albion		
2011–	Worcester Warriors		

George Porter (born 15 May 1989) is an English rugby union player for Worcester Warriors in the Aviva Premiership. He has played for England U18.

He plays as a prop.

George joined Plymouth Albion in 2009 and left in 2011, when he joined the Worcester Warriors.
