= Ben Howard (rugby union) =

English rugby player (born 1993)

- Born: 7 February 1993 (age 33) Bradford, England
- Height: 1.96 m (6 ft 5 in)
- Weight: 97 kg (15 st 4 lb)

Rugby union career
- Position: Wing
- Current team: Old Elthamians
Senior career
Years	Team	Apps	(Points)
2012−2018	Worcester Warriors	64	(80)

Ben Howard (born 7 February 1993 in Bradford, West Yorkshire, England) is a British rugby union football player, playing for Old Elthamians in the National League 1. He is a winger who has represented England at Under-20 level.

Howard joined Worcester aged 18, and made his Premiership debut against Leicester Tigers at Welford Road in September 2012. He scored two tries on his European debut against Gernika RT in the Amlin Challenge Cup. Howard was in the England Under-20 side that won the Six Nations Championship in 2013, and went on to defeat Wales in the Junior World Cup Final in France in June 2013.
