= Joffrey Michel =

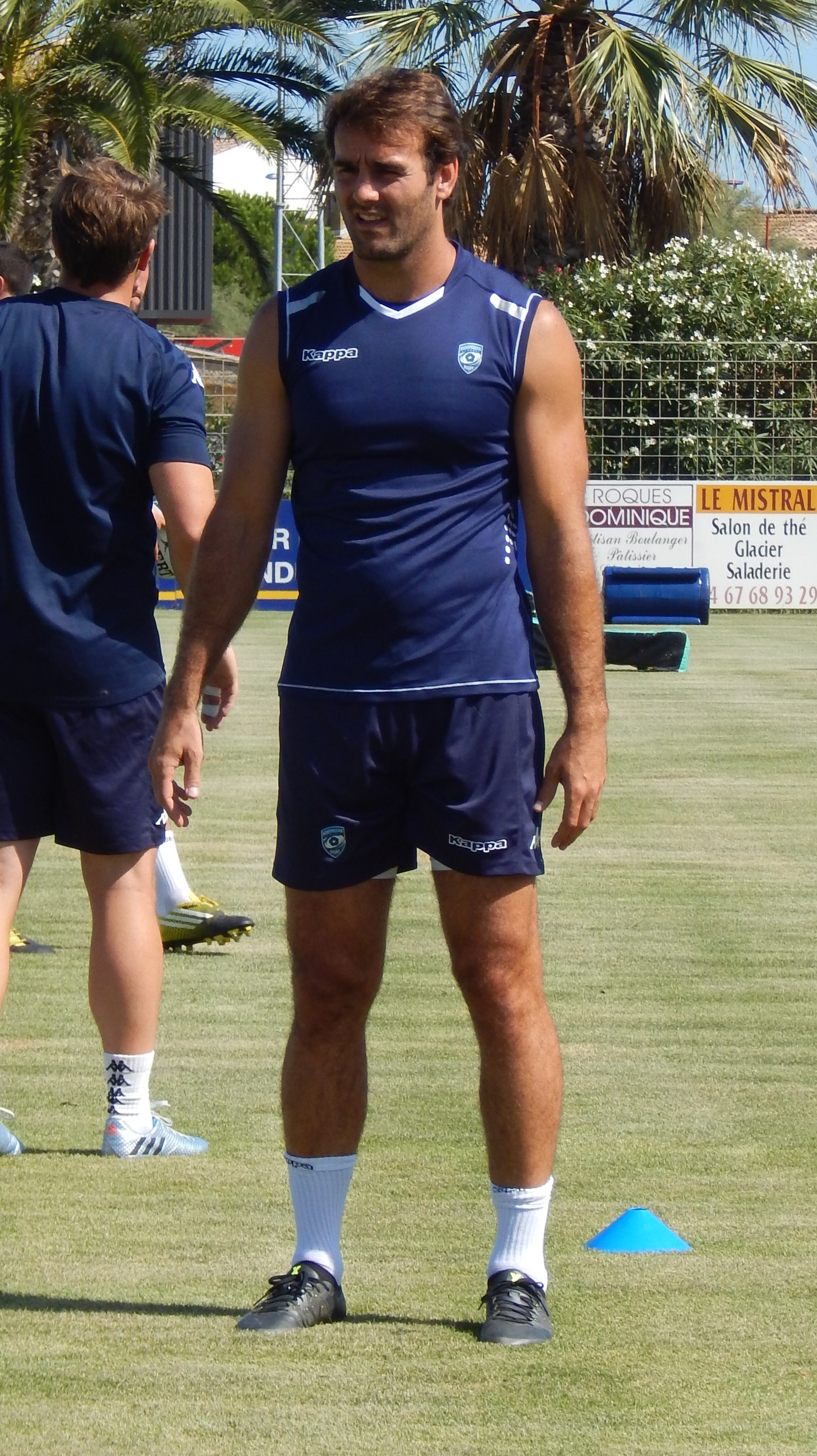
- Born: 4 March 1987 (age 39) Arles, France
- Height: 1.91 m (6 ft 3 in)
- Weight: 94 kg (14 st 11 lb; 207 lb)

Rugby union career
- Current team: Montpellier
Senior career
| Years | Team | Apps | (Points) |
| 2008–2016 | USA Perpignan | 101 | (95) |
| 2016–present | Montpellier | 29 | (10) |
- Correct as of 29 April 2018

Joffrey Michel (born 4 March 1987 in Arles) is a French rugby union player. His position is fullback or wing and he currently plays for Montpellier in the Top 14.

== Honours ==
- USA Perpignan
  - Top 14 (2009)
