= Errie Claassens =

South African rugby union player (born 1981)

- Born: Errie Claassens; October 27, 1981 (age 45) Kroonstad, Free State, South Africa
- Height: 1.80 m (5 ft 11 in)
- Weight: 97 kg (214 lb)

Rugby union career
- Position(s): Wing, Full Back
Senior career
Years	Team	Apps	(Points)
2005–09	Rotherham Titans	87	(190)
2009–11	London Welsh		
2011–12	Worcester Warriors	52	(120)
2013–14	Bristol Rugby		
2014–15	London Scottish		

Errie Claassens (born 27 October 1981) is a former South Africa rugby union player. Errie is the brother of Toulon player Michael Claassens who plays at scrum half and has represented the Free State Cheetahs and the Springboks.

Claassens moved to the UK in 2005 to sign for the Rotherham Titans where he spent four seasons, developing from a bit part player into a proven try scorer.

In 2009 he moved to London Welsh where he was to further his reputation with a strong try scoring record. He can play at both full back and winger.

Errie formerly played as a fullback or winger for Worcester Warriors.

Claassens was named as part of the Rugby Times magazine 2009/2010 RFU Championship "Dream Team" thanks to his consistently strong play and try scoring reputation.

In 2013, Errie Claassens signed a contract to join Bristol Rugby in the RFU Championship. However, on 21 May 2014, he left Bristol by mutual consent as he officially joined London Scottish on a two-year contract.

On 27 January 2015, Claassens announced his retirement from professional rugby due to ongoing injuries.
