= Armand Batlle =

French rugby union player

- Born: 4 June 1987 (age 39) Perpignan, France
- Height: 1.86 m (6 ft 1 in)
- Weight: 87 kg (13 st 10 lb; 192 lb)

Rugby union career
- Position: Wing
Senior career
Years	Team	Apps	(Points)
2009–2013	USA Perpignan	35	(45)
2013-2015	US Colomiers	45	(90)
2015-2017	FC Grenoble	35	(40)
2017-2021	Castres Olympique	61	(153)
- Correct as of 7 April 2021

Armand Batlle (born 12 April 1987) is a French rugby union player. He plays on the wing for Castres Olympique in the Top 14.

== Honours ==
=== Club ===
(France) Castres

- Top 14: 2017–18
