= Adrien Planté =

French rugby union player (born 1985)

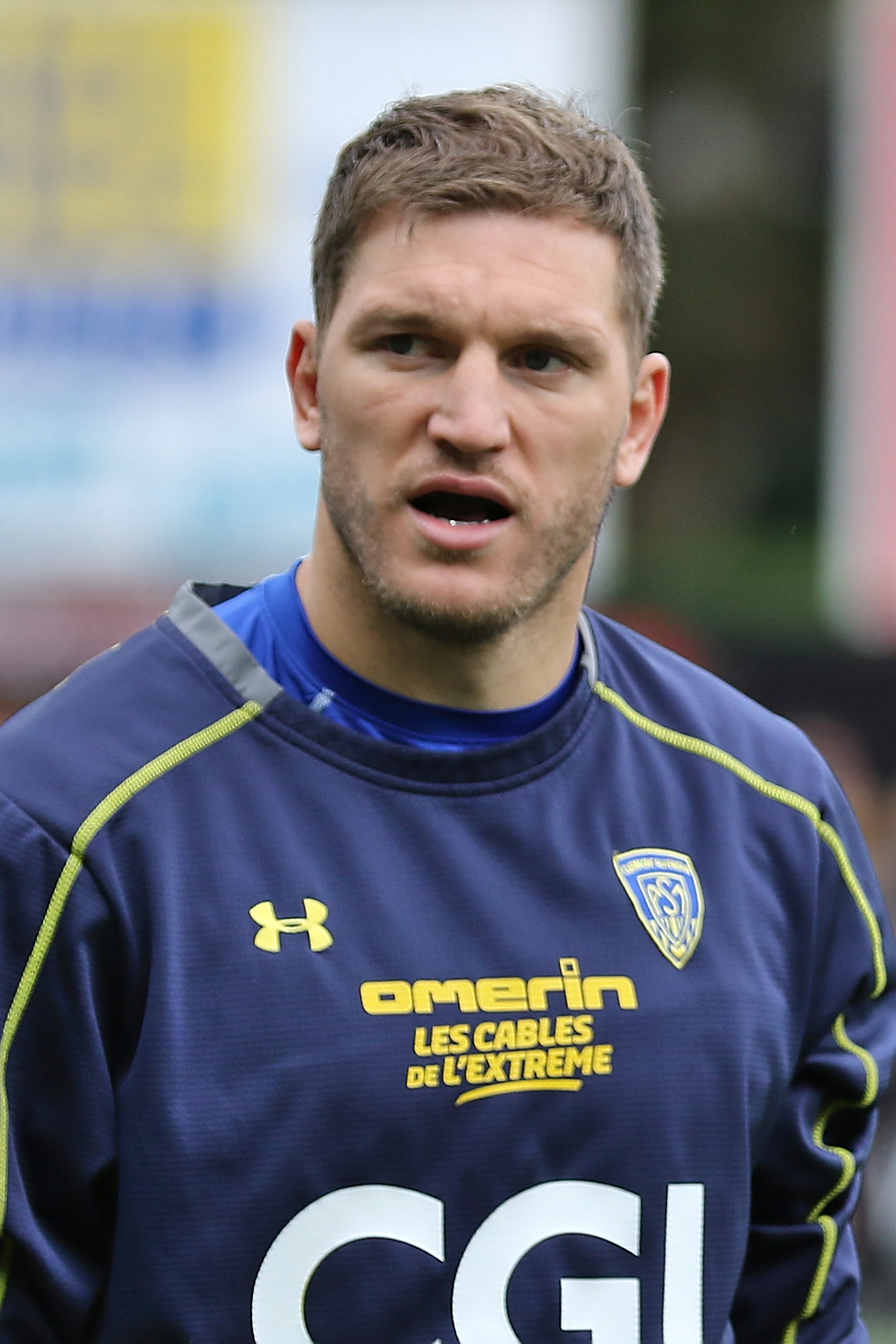
- Born: 25 April 1985 (age 41) Longjumeau, France
- Height: 1.83 m (6 ft 0 in)
- Weight: 84 kg (13 st 3 lb)

Rugby union career
- Position: Wing
Senior career
Years	Team	Apps	(Points)
2006–2007	Narbonne	14	(5)
2007–2013	Perpignan	127	(160)
2013-15	Racing Metro	31	(20)
2015-17	ASM Clermont Auvergne	25	(10)
2017-	Section Paloise	10	(10)
- Correct as of 09 December 2019
International career
Years	Team	Apps	(Points)
2013	France	2	(0)
- Correct as of 31 January 2015

Adrien Planté (born 25 April 1985) is a French rugby union player. He plays on the wing currently for Section Paloise in the Top 14. He began his career with RC Narbonne before moving to USA Perpignan in 2007. He has signed for Racing Metro for the current season.

== Honours ==
- Top 14 Champion – 2008–09
- Top 14 Runner-up – 2009–10
