= Danny Gray (rugby union) =

English rugby union player (born 1983)

- Born: 21 May 1983 (age 43) Sutton, London, England
- Height: 1.75 m (5 ft 9 in)
- Weight: 85 kg (13 st 5 lb)

Rugby union career
- Position: Fly-half
Senior career
Years	Team	Apps	(Points)
2003–2007	Bristol	61	(326)
2007–2010	Exeter Chiefs		
2010–2011	US Montauban		
2011–2014	Worcester Warriors		

Danny Gray (born 21 May 1983) is a rugby union fly half who plays for the Worcester Warriors, having played for French side US Montauban, Exeter Chiefs and Bristol. He was selected for the England Sevens team in 2006–2007 after having been part of the wider sevens squad in 2005–2006. A prolific scorer Danny Gray was an integral part of Exeter Chiefs plans to gain promotion to the Guinness Premiership. In 2011 Danny signed for Worcester Warriors on a one-year contract.

In 2012, Danny signed for another two-year deal with Worcester Warriors. On 27 February 2014, Gray left Worcester Warriors by mutual consent.
