= Josh Drauniniu =

Fijian rugby union player

- Born: Josh Drauniniu; 17 August 1985 (age 41) Suva, Fiji
- Height: 1.91 m (6 ft 3 in)
- Weight: 95 kg (209 lb)

Rugby union career
- Position: Wing
Senior career
Years	Team	Apps	(Points)
2003-2007	Royal Navy		
2007-2009	Exeter Chiefs		(110)
2009-2010	Harlequins		
2010-2011	London Welsh	22	(80)
2011-2015	Worcester Warriors		
2015-2016	London Welsh		
2016-	Rouen		
National sevens team
Years	Team		Comps
2008-2011	England		

Josh Drauniniu (born 17 August 1985) is a rugby union footballer who currently plays for Rouen Normandie Rugby of France Rugby's Pro D2.

Drauniniu joined the Royal Navy in 2003 at the age of 17 and saw active service in the Gulf in 2005. Upon joining the Navy, Josh was soon introduced to rugby union, having played rugby league and football at school in Fiji, and he made his debut in the annual Army v Navy match at Twickenham in 2004.

Three years later he was signed by Exeter Chiefs, where his pace on the wing caught the eye of the England Sevens selectors.

England beat New Zealand 21–19 to secure a meeting with South Africa in the final. He failed the final hurdle, but his performances were enough to earn him a place in the England squad for the 2009 Sevens World Cup in Dubai, though England would go out to Samoa in the quarter-finals.

Despite his England Sevens commitment, Josh was still named in Rugby Times' National League 1 Team of the Season for 2008/09, having scored 16 tries.

In his first season for Exeter Chiefs he had raced in for 22 tries, and it was that try scoring form that tempted Harlequins to bring him to the Guinness Premiership.

His first start for Quins came in a 9–9 draw with London Irish at the Stoop in October 2009, but the highlight of his time at the club would come against the Northampton Saints at Franklin's Gardens three weeks later when he scored two tries as a second-half replacement in a 27–16 defeat. He made one Heineken Cup appearance, as a replacement against the Cardiff Blues at The Stoop, and was named on the bench for last years A League final against Leicester Development at Welford Road, which the home side won 29–27.

In February 2010 he made his way back into Ben Ryan's England Sevens team for the Adelaide and Hong Kong legs of the IRB World Series.

Drauniniu is known as an attacking winger with a dangerous side step, and his talents have not gone unnoticed by rival clubs. He signed for the Worcester Warriors for their first season back in the Aviva Premiership

On 22 May 2015, Drauniniu re-signed with London Welsh back in the RFU Championship from the 2015–16 season.
