= Shane Monahan (rugby union) =

Rugby player

- Born: 28 April 1987 (age 39) Drogheda, Ireland
- Height: 1.88 m (6 ft 2 in)
- Weight: 103 kg (16.2 st; 227 lb)

Rugby union career
- Position(s): Wing, Centre
Senior career
Years	Team	Apps	(Points)
2009–2010	Leinster	1	(0)
2010–2011	Connacht	4	(0)
2011–2012	Rotherham	26	(55)
2012–2015	Gloucester	34	(65)
2015	Munster	3	(0)
- Correct as of 18 October 2015
International career
Years	Team	Apps	(Points)
2007	Ireland U20	5	(5)
- Correct as of 10 February 2015

Shane Monahan (born 28 April 1987) is an Irish professional rugby union player.

Monahan previous played for Leinster as an academy player and for Connacht in Ireland. He then played for the English side Rotherham Titans in the RFU Championship, where he became a stand out performer, scoring eleven tries in the 2011–12 season as they finished seventh in the table.

Monahan signed a one-year deal to join Aviva Premiership side Gloucester for the 2012–13 season. His first highlight was scoring four tries in the Amlin Challenge Cup victory over London Irish. On 2 April 2013, it was announced that Monahan had signed a two-year contract extension to keep him at Gloucester until the end of the 2014–15 season.

On 13 August 2015, it was announced that Irish Pro12 side Munster had signed Monahan on a short-term contract as cover during the 2015 Rugby World Cup. He made his debut for Munster on 5 September 2015, starting against Treviso. Monahan left Munster in November 2015, upon the conclusion of his contract.
