= Farid Sid =

French rugby union player

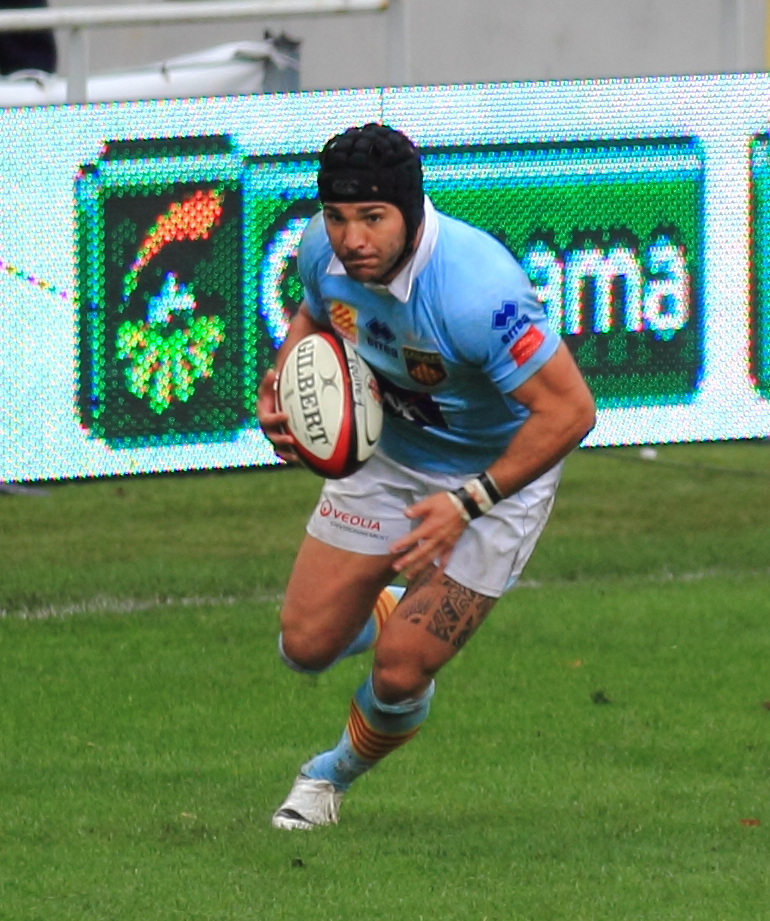
- Born: 27 March 1979 (age 47) Perpignan, France
- Height: 1.76 m (5 ft 9 1/2 in)
- Weight: 88 kg (13 st 12 lb)

Rugby union career
- Position: Wing
Senior career
Years	Team	Apps	(Points)
1997–2003	USA Perpignan	41	(35)
2003–2004	US Colomiers	10	(15)
2004–2008	CA Brive	86	(90)
2008–	USA Perpignan	94	(100)
- Correct as of 22 November 2012

Farid Sid (born 27 March 1979) is a French rugby union player. His plays on the wing for USA Perpignan in the Top 14. He began his career with home-town club Perpignan and moved to Colomiers in 2003. He spent a season with Colomiers and then transferred to Brive, where he spent four seasons. He returned to USA Perpignan in 2008, helping them to the Bouclier de Brennus in 2009.

== Honours ==
- Top 14 Champion – 2008–09
