= Andy Short =

- Born: 26 March 1991 (age 35) Worcester, England UK
- Height: 1.85 m (6 ft 1 in)
- Weight: 93 kg (14 st 9 lb)
- School: Hanley Castle High School; Worcester Sixth Form College

Rugby union career
- Position(s): Wing, Centre
Senior career
Years	Team	Apps	(Points)
2010-2013, 2015-	Worcester Warriors		
2013-2015	Bristol		
2015	London Irish (loan)		

Andy Short (born 26 March 1991 in Worcester) is an English rugby union player who played for Worcester Warriors in the Aviva Premiership. He has also played for England U18 and U21.

He plays as a centre or wing.

Short made his Worcester debut off the bench against Bristol Bears in October 2010 and went on to make ten appearances in all competitions.

The talented running centre/wing was previously a student at Worcester Sixth Form College as part of the Warriors’ Advanced Apprenticeship in Sporting Excellence (AASE) scheme, having attended Upton-on-Severn Primary and Royal Grammar School Worcester. Short, who first played for Worcester U9s and captained the club’s age group teams as well as his school, has played for England and Under-18, Under-19 and Under-20 level.

He toured South Africa with England Under 18s in the summer of 2009, scoring two tries in the 95-0 win over Western Province at Rondebosch Boys School.

Short continued to shine for England Under-20s in the 2010/11 season and memorably scored four tries against Italy in a Grand Slam winning campaign. In the summer of 2011 he travelled to Italy to take part in the Junior World Championships.

Short spent the second-half of the 2011/12 season on loan to Cornish Pirates and subsequently suffered a broken hand in the JP Morgan Sevens after returning to Warriors.

After returning to fitness, Short impressed in the Amlin Challenge Cup and scored five tries in the first two rounds of the competition.

In 2013, Short signed a contract to go to Bristol Club. He will leave Worcester at the end of the 2012/2013 season.

In early 2015, Andy agreed to rejoin Worcester for the 2015/2016 season. However, as they are Championship rivals, Bristol coach Andy Robinson was not happy for Short to continue playing for Bristol meaning he was loaned to London Irish for the remainder of the season.
