= 2010–11 Top 14 season =

French domestic rugby union club competition

- Countries: France
- Champions: Toulouse
- Runners-up: Montpellier
- Relegated: La Rochelle; Bourgoin
- Matches played: 187
- Attendance: 2,827,343 (average 15,119 per match)
- Tries scored: 692 (average 3.7 per match)
- Top point scorer: (France) Jonathan Wisniewski (336)
- Top try scorer: (France) Maxime Médard (15)

The 2010–11 Top 14 competition was a French domestic rugby union club competition operated by the Ligue Nationale de Rugby (LNR). Home-and-away play began on August 13, 2010 and continued through April 2011. The regular season was followed by a three-round playoff starting in May that involved the top six teams, culminating in the final on June 4 at Stade de France. Toulouse won the Bouclier de Brennus for the 18th time, defeating Montpellier 15–10.

== Season synopsis ==
This year's edition of the Top 14 welcomed Agen, winners of the 2010 title in the second-level Pro D2 and returning to the top flight three years after being relegated, and La Rochelle, victors in the 2009 promotion playoffs between the second- through fifth-placed teams. They took the place of Montauban and Albi, relegated at the end of the 2009–10 Top 14.

Of the two promoted teams, Agen survived, while La Rochelle were tentatively relegated after finishing second-from-bottom. The other relegated side were Bourgoin, which had barely avoided bankruptcy in the previous season. Their financial struggles continued, and they were docked 5 points for their financial issues. The deduction was ultimately immaterial, as even without it they would have finished more than 20 points adrift of 13th-place La Rochelle.

There was, however, a chance that La Rochelle would be spared the drop. During the season, Stade Français faced major financial issues, temporarily avoiding an administrative relegation in early June 2011 when president Max Guazzini announced a deal in which a Canadian foundation, working with former France national coach Bernard Laporte and an unnamed investor, would purchase a minority stake in the club. However, the planned infusion of €12 million did not materialize; Guazzini and Laporte sued the foundation, and three people had been arrested in connection with the deal as of June 24. On June 27, Guazzini met with the LNR's financial watchdog, DNACG, to discuss the club's situation. Reports indicated that if the club did not find €6.6 million by the time of the meeting, Stade would file for bankruptcy, which would result in an automatic relegation to the nominally amateur Fédérale 1. The French government had announced it would not bail out the club. The meeting ended with the announcement of a new deal by which Guazzini would sell a controlling stake in the club to a group of investors led by French technology executive Jean-Pierre Savare, keeping Stade in the Top 14 and confirming La Rochelle's relegation. As part of the deal, Guazzini stepped aside as club president in favor of Savare's son Thomas.

The season saw signs of a changing of the guard in French rugby, especially in Paris. Racing Métro reasserted itself as a national power, finishing second on the season table. Bayonne went from being reprieved from relegation to playoff contenders, ultimately missing out in the final week of the season. Montpellier went from fighting for survival through much of 2009–10 to finalists this season, winning their quarterfinal and semifinal matches away by 1 point each, and leading Toulouse for most of the final before falling short. In the end, traditional power Toulouse lifted the Bouclier de Brennus.

== Previous season ==
The 2009–10 season saw Clermont, in their 100th season, end decades of frustration by defeating Perpignan in the final to claim their first title, having lost in all 10 of their previous final appearances. At the other end of the table, Albi, which had been promoted to the Top 14 for 2009–10, finished bottom of the table and went down. Bayonne finished second-to-bottom but avoided relegation when it was revealed that 12th-placed Montauban were filing for bankruptcy and would therefore be automatically relegated. The other newly promoted team in 2009–10, Racing Métro, enjoyed a very successful season, finishing sixth, and qualified to the quarter-finals where they narrowly lost to eventual champions Clermont.

== Competition format ==
Each club played every other club twice. The second half of the season was conducted in the same order as the first, with the club at home in the first half of the season away in the second. This season maintained the format introduced the previous season for the knockout stage: the top two teams qualified directly to the semifinals, while teams ranked from third to sixth qualified for a quarterfinal held at the home ground of the higher-ranked team. Semifinals are traditionally held at neutral sites; this season, both were held at Stade Vélodrome in Marseille. The final was held at Stade de France.

Going into the season, the top six clubs are guaranteed of berths in the following season's Heineken Cup. The winners of the 2010–11 Heineken Cup and European Challenge Cup are assured of berths in the 2011–12 Heineken Cup regardless of their league standing, as long as they avoid relegation. This means that if a club finishes in the top six and wins one of the European competitions, the seventh-place team will gain a Heineken Cup berth. However, if French clubs win both competitions, only five clubs will qualify for the 2011–12 Heineken Cup via their league position because France is capped at seven Heineken Cup places. France can also secure a seventh berth if clubs from England's Aviva Premiership, also capped at seven Heineken Cup places, win both Cup competitions, and the top club in the European Rugby Club Rankings among those not already qualified for the Heineken Cup is from the Top 14. Note, however, that if a winner of one of the European cups is relegated in the same season, LNR will not nominate it for European competition; its place will be taken by a current Top 14 side based on league position.

The bottom two teams are provisionally relegated to Pro D2, with the possibility of one or both of the bottom teams to be reprieved if a team above them fails a postseason financial audit (mandatory for all clubs in the league).

The LNR uses a slightly different bonus points system from that used in most other rugby competitions. It trialled a new system in 2007–08 explicitly designed to prevent a losing team from earning more than one bonus point in a match, a system that also made it impossible for either team to earn a bonus point in a drawn match. The LNR chose to continue with this system for subsequent seasons.

France's bonus point system operates as follows:

- 4 points for a win.
- 2 points for a draw.
- 1 "bonus" point for winning while scoring at least 3 more tries than the opponent. This replaces the standard bonus point for scoring 4 tries regardless of the match result.
- 1 "bonus" point for losing by 7 points (or less).

== New developments ==
=== Salary cap ===
This season was the first in French rugby history to have a fixed salary cap. Previously, the only restrictions on team salaries were that wage bills were limited to 50% of turnover and that 10% of the salary budget had to be held in reserve. In December 2009, LNR announced that team payrolls would be limited to €8 million in 2010–11, and that the reserve requirement would be increased to 20%. The previous limitation of 50% of turnover remained in effect. However, rugby journalist Ian Moriarty dismissed the cap as "little more than a bit of sleight of hand by the LNR to appease a sporting public", noting that the announced cap was 5% greater than the highest official wage bill in the 2009–10 Top 14, and translated to £7.1 million at the time of announcement, well above the then-current £4 million cap in the English Premiership. Moriarty also added that clubs would likely find ways around the cap, noting, "Last season [2008–09], it's rumoured that one big, overseas name was paid less than 40% of his total income as a salary."

=== Domestic player rules ===
LNR also announced new rules requiring a minimum percentage of French players on team rosters. Under the new policy, "French players" are defined as those meeting the following criteria:

- Players 21 or over must have been registered with the French Rugby Federation (FFR) for at least five years before having turned 21.
- Players currently under 21 must have spent at least three seasons in an FFR-approved training centre.

The required percentage of French players was 40% this season, and will increase to 50% in 2011–12 and 60% in 2012–13.

=== Tax issues ===
A change in French tax law that took effect on 1 July 2010 raised concerns about the financial future of smaller clubs. The root of this issue is a French law known as DIC (Droit à l'Image Collectif), passed in 2004, that had allowed all French professional sports clubs to treat 30% of each player's salary as image rights. This portion of the salary was thus exempt from France's high employment and social insurance taxes, allowing French clubs to compete on a more equal financial footing with those in other European countries. However, the government announced in 2009 that it would suspend DIC.

The policy change was publicly criticized by wealthy club owners. Mourad Boudjellal of Toulon, who claimed that the change in the law would cost him more than €1 million in 2010–11, and Paul Goze of Perpignan took to the pitch before one of their matches to participate in a protest. Max Guazzini of Stade Français complained that the end of DIC would cost him about €800,000. However, the real concern in French rugby circles was for the potential blow to smaller clubs. Bourgoin, who only avoided a bankruptcy filing in 2009 by players agreeing to large wage cuts, faced an effective increase of €400,000 in their 2010–11 expenses. Brive had already announced that they would slash their budget by 40% for the 2010–11 season, but with a 2009–10 wage bill of €7.2 million and several high-profile players locked into long-term contracts, the increased tax bill was speculated to be a serious problem for the club.

=== Financial troubles at Bourgoin ===
Bourgoin's financial struggles became a major issue during the early summer of 2010. The club had been called in for a financial review by LNR's financial watchdog DNACG late in the 2009–10 season, which they survived with no action taken at that time. However, after the fixture list for the 2010–11 season was released, DNACG denied Bourgoin a professional license. Bourgoin appealed this ruling, and also considered pursuing legal action against LNR. Had Bourgoin been unsuccessful in their bid to stave off relegation, the choice of the team to replace them would not have been straightforward, as the most logical choice, Albi, who had been relegated after finishing at the bottom of the 2009–10 table, were facing their own financial problems and may not have had the resources for a Top 14 campaign. However, the FFR officially rescinded the DNACG's ruling on July 9, allowing Bourgoin to stay in the Top 14, thus also confirming Albi's place in Pro D2.

== The teams ==
Locations of the 2010–11 Top 14 teams

Team	Captain	Head coach	Stadium	Capacity
Agen	(South Africa) Adri Badenhorst	(France) Christophe Deylaud (France) Christian Lanta	Stade Armandie	14,600
Bayonne	(France) Pépito Elhorga	(France) Christian Gajan	Stade Jean-Dauger	16,934
Biarritz	(France) Imanol Harinordoquy	(Australia) Jack Isaac and (France) Jean-Michel Gonzalez	Parc des Sports Aguiléra	15,000
Bourgoin	(France) Julien Frier	(France) Éric Catinot	Stade Pierre-Rajon	9,441
Brive	(France) Antonie Claassen	(France) Ugo Mola	Stade Amédée-Domenech	15,000
Castres	(France) Alexandre Albouy (France) Sébastien Tillous-Borde	(France) Laurent Labit and (France) Laurent Travers	Stade Pierre-Antoine	11,500
Clermont	(France) Aurélien Rougerie	(New Zealand) Vern Cotter	Stade Marcel-Michelin	16,334
Montpellier	(France) Fulgence Ouedraogo	(France) Fabien Galthié	Stade Yves-du-Manoir	15,000
Perpignan	(France) Nicolas Mas	(France) Jacques Brunel	Stade Aimé-Giral	16,593
Racing Métro	(France) Lionel Nallet	(France) Pierre Berbizier	Stade Olympique Yves-du-Manoir	14,000
La Rochelle	(Germany) Robert Mohr	(France) Serge Milhas	Stade Marcel-Deflandre	12,500
Stade Français	(Italy) Sergio Parisse	(Australia) Michael Cheika	Stade Charléty	20,000
Stade Français	(Italy) Sergio Parisse	(Australia) Michael Cheika	Stade de France	80,000
Toulon	(South Africa) Joe van Niekerk	(France) Philippe Saint-André	Stade Mayol	13,700
Toulouse	(France) Thierry Dusautoir	(France) Guy Novès	Stade Ernest-Wallon	19,500
Toulouse	(France) Thierry Dusautoir	(France) Guy Novès	Stadium Municipal	35,472

Note: Stade Francais have moved their home matches from their traditional home of Stade Jean-Bouin while a new 20,000-seat stadium is built on the site. The new Jean-Bouin is scheduled to open in 2013–14.

== Table ==
Pos	Team	Pld	W	D	L	PF	PA	PD	B	Pts	Qualification or relegation
1	Toulouse	26	17	1	8	664	485	+179	12	82	Advance to playoff semi-finals Qualified for the 2011–12 Heineken Cup
2	Racing Métro	26	16	2	8	674	549	+125	10	78	Advance to playoff semi-finals Qualified for the 2011–12 Heineken Cup
3	Castres	26	16	1	9	617	487	+130	10	76	Advance to playoff quarter-finals Qualified for the 2011–12 Heineken Cup
4	Clermont	26	15	0	11	600	445	+155	12	72 (Note: Head-to-head: Clermont: 10; Biarritz: 9; Montpellier: 9)	Advance to playoff quarter-finals Qualified for the 2011–12 Heineken Cup
5	Biarritz	26	15	1	10	647	571	+76	10	72 (Note: Head-to-head: Biarritz 5; Montpellier: 4)	Qualified for the 2011–12 Heineken Cup
6	Montpellier	26	15	1	10	602	495	+107	10	72	Qualified for the 2011–12 Heineken Cup
7	Bayonne	26	16	0	10	569	508	+61	7	71	
8	Toulon	26	15	0	11	559	469	+90	10	70	
9	Perpignan	26	13	3	10	538	543	−5	5	63	
10	Agen	26	11	1	14	534	677	−143	5	51	
11	Stade Français	26	10	1	15	562	614	−52	7	49	
12	Brive	26	8	2	16	495	578	−83	10	46	
13	La Rochelle	26	6	1	19	476	673	−197	7	33	Relegated to the 2011–12 Rugby Pro D2
14	Bourgoin	26	2	0	24	379	822	−443	3	6 (Note: On January 4, Bourgoin were docked five points by the DNACG because of a predicted deficit of 1.5 million euros. Bourgoin first decided to appeal this decision on January 10 before changing their minds on February 8, causing the point deduction to stand.)	Relegated to the 2011–12 Rugby Pro D2

Notes:

Notes

1. It was possible that the sixth-place team on the table would not qualify for the Heineken Cup. However, it would have occurred only if French teams had won both the Heineken Cup and Amlin Challenge Cup, both of these teams had finished outside the top six on the league table and avoided relegation, and the sixth-place team had not advanced to the Top 14 final (under LNR regulations, the participants in the final receive the first two priority spots on its Heineken Cup entry list, ahead of a French Heineken Cup winner). This did not happen in 2010–11.
2. Conversely, if the only French team to win a European trophy finished in the top six, or if both European trophy winners finished in the top six, the seventh-place finisher would receive a Heineken Cup berth. This also did not happen in 2010–11, as the cup winners were Leinster (Ireland, Heineken Cup) and Harlequins (England, Challenge Cup).

== Results ==
As in recent seasons, several teams took occasional home matches to larger stadiums, either in their home city or a nearby location. In addition to Stade Français and Toulouse, whose use of larger venues is long-established, the following teams took home matches to other venues:

- Castres — Round 2 vs. Toulouse, Stade de la Méditerranée, Béziers
- Toulon — Round 7 vs. Clermont and Round 25 vs. Toulouse, Stade Vélodrome, Marseille
- Bourgoin — Round 12 vs. Toulouse and Round 20 vs. Racing Métro, Stade des Alpes, Grenoble
- Bayonne — Round 20 vs. Toulouse, Estadio Anoeta, Donostia-San Sebastián, Spain
- Biarritz — Round 22 vs. Bayonne, Estadio Anoeta
- Racing Métro — Round 22 vs. Toulouse, Stade de France, Saint-Denis

=== Key ===
The score of the game is given by the middle (third and fourth) columns. The first and last columns indicate the number of tries scored by the home and the away team, respectively. A blue border indicates that the team has earned an attacking bonus point (i.e. has scored at least three more tries than its opponent), a yellow one that the team has earned a defensive bonus point (defeat by 7 points or less).

Within each round, matches are listed in order of kickoff time. Matches with the same kickoff time are listed in alphabetic order of the home team. A dark horizontal line separates matches held on different dates.

Round 1

13 and 14 August

6	Toulouse	44	24	Agen	3
0	Brive	18	23	Racing Métro 92	2
2	Biarritz	30	22	Montpellier	3
1	Toulon	22	26	Bayonne	2
5	Stade Français	43	12	Bourgoin	0
0	Perpignan	21	13	Clermont	1
3	La Rochelle	22	17	Castres	2

Round 2

20 and 21 August

0	Bourgoin	12	25	Clermont	3
2	Brive	26	11	Perpignan	1
4	Montpellier	36	19	Racing Métro 92	1
3	Bayonne	27	0	Agen	0
5	Stade Français	41	26	La Rochelle	3
0	Biarritz	3	13	Toulon	1
1	Castres	22	16	Toulouse	1

Round 3

27 and 28 August

1	Toulon	31	36	Racing Métro 92	3
0	Perpignan	6	16	Montpellier	1
1	Agen	28	23	Biarritz	2
1	Castres	25	16	Bayonne	1
1	La Rochelle	20	12	Bourgoin	0
3	Clermont	33	9	Brive	0
3	Toulouse	34	16	Stade Français	1

Round 4

1 September

1	Montpellier	22	21	Toulouse	2
2	Perpignan	17	12	Biarritz	0
1	Bayonne	19	18	Brive	2
1	La Rochelle	13	15	Toulon	0
1	Bourgoin	22	15	Agen	0
5	Stade Français	40	34	Castres	3
1	Racing Métro 92	28	17	Clermont	1

Round 5

5 September

3	Agen	23	23	Perpignan	1
1	Castres	31	25	Racing Métro 92	1
2	Bourgoin	23	28	Bayonne	3
7	Toulouse	50	3	La Rochelle	0
3	Clermont	27	10	Montpellier	1
3	Brive	27	9	Toulon	0
1	Biarritz	19	11	Stade Français	1

Round 6

10 and 11 September

0	Bayonne	18	16	Clermont	1
2	Perpignan	27	20	Bourgoin	2
5	Racing Métro 92	43	18	La Rochelle	2
3	Stade Français	27	29	Brive	2
2	Montpellier	23	12	Castres	0
6	Toulon	41	10	Agen	1
1	Biarritz	25	20	Toulouse	2

Round 7

17 and 18 September

2	Toulouse	29	20	Bayonne	2
1	Perpignan	22	21	Stade Français	2
6	Racing Métro 92	51	20	Bourgoin	2
3	La Rochelle	23	29	Biarritz	2
1	Castres	28	6	Brive	0
0	Agen	6	35	Montpellier	4
1	Toulon	28	16	Clermont	1

Round 8

24 and 25 September

0	Bourgoin	3	26	Toulon	2
2	Agen	12	27	Stade Français	2
1	Racing Métro 92	17	12	Biarritz	0
1	Brive	16	16	Toulouse	1
2	Clermont	24	6	Castres	0
2	Bayonne	25	26	Perpignan	2
3	Montpellier	26	6	La Rochelle	0

Round 9

1 and 2 October

1	Toulon	22	15	Castres	0
2	Bourgoin	18	3	Brive	0
3	Stade Français	30	13	Montpellier	2
3	Perpignan	21	16	La Rochelle	1
7	Clermont	45	19	Agen	1
1	Toulouse	28	23	Racing Métro 92	1
1	Bayonne	19	22	Biarritz	1

Round 10

22 and 23 October

0	Racing Métro 92	15	9	Bayonne	0
5	Toulouse	38	29	Perpignan	2
4	Castres	38	11	Agen	1
3	La Rochelle	26	21	Brive	2
3	Montpellier	28	3	Bourgoin	0
1	Biarritz	16	13	Clermont	1
1	Stade Français	22	15	Toulon	0

Round 11

29 and 30 October

0	Racing Métro 92	18	18	Perpignan	0
3	Clermont	27	3	Stade Français	0
0	Bayonne	18	29	Montpellier	2
2	Agen	29	14	La Rochelle	2
6	Castres	41	24	Bourgoin	3
2	Brive	21	27	Biarritz	2
6	Toulouse	44	5	Toulon	1

Round 12

4 November

0	Agen	21	20	Racing Métro 92	1
3	Perpignan	20	29	Toulon	2
1	La Rochelle	22	14	Clermont	1
1	Biarritz	17	17	Castres	1
1	Stade Français	20	24	Bayonne	3
4	Montpellier	35	9	Brive	0
1	Bourgoin	11	35	Toulouse	4

Round 13

4 December

2	Toulon	29	13	Montpellier	1
0	Racing Métro 92	15	13	Stade Français	1
0	Brive	12	30	Agen	3
3	Castres	23	13	Perpignan	1
2	Bayonne	23	14	La Rochelle	1
2	Clermont	32	25	Toulouse	1
5	Biarritz	37	20	Bourgoin	2

Round 14

29 December

1	Montpellier	22	16	Biarritz	1
1	Bayonne	20	9	Toulon	0
1	Agen	8	25	Toulouse	1
3	Castres	25	10	La Rochelle	1
2	Bourgoin	16	26	Stade Français	2
0	Racing Métro 92	6	6	Brive	0
1	Clermont	22	16	Perpignan	1

Round 15

2 January

2	Perpignan	23	16	Brive	1
4	Toulon	38	26	Biarritz	2
2	Agen	21	3	Bayonne	0
4	Clermont	34	9	Bourgoin	0
2	La Rochelle	26	26	Stade Français	2
3	Racing Métro 92	28	16	Montpellier	1
2	Toulouse	23	16	Castres	1

Round 16

7–9 January

2	Brive	29	22	Clermont	3
0	Montpellier	12	12	Perpignan	0
10	Biarritz	65	22	Agen	3
1	Bayonne	25	22	Castres	1
2	Bourgoin	14	44	La Rochelle	5
3	Stade Français	31	3	Toulouse	0
0	Racing Métro 92	15	12	Toulon	0

Round 17

26 and 27 January

3	Clermont	31	15	Racing Métro 92	0
2	Biarritz	23	21	Perpignan	3
2	Brive	18	26	Bayonne	3
2	Toulon	12	9	La Rochelle	0
2	Agen	23	9	Bourgoin	0
3	Castres	34	12	Stade Français	0
4	Toulouse	29	9	Montpellier	0

Round 18

11 and 12 February

1	La Rochelle	19	22	Toulouse	1
1	Toulon	22	16	Brive	1
5	Perpignan	31	18	Agen	2
2	Racing Métro 92	20	13	Castres	1
3	Bayonne	24	7	Bourgoin	1
4	Montpellier	29	9	Clermont	0
1	Stade Français	31	18	Biarritz	0

Round 19

18 and 19 February

1	Brive	26	10	Stade Français	2
0	Bourgoin	15	32	Perpignan	2
2	La Rochelle	24	32	Racing Métro 92	2
5	Castres	43	29	Montpellier	4
2	Clermont	24	19	Bayonne	1
2	Toulouse	23	19	Biarritz	1
2	Agen	23	13	Toulon	1

Round 20

4 and 5 March

1	Clermont	19	12	Toulon	2
0	Stade Français	9	21	Perpignan	2
1	Bourgoin	19	38	Racing Métro 92	4
4	Biarritz	32	30	La Rochelle	4
0	Brive	12	20	Castres	2
1	Bayonne	19	13	Toulouse	1
1	Montpellier	25	24	Agen	3

Round 21

11 March

2	Perpignan	25	19	Bayonne	2
4	Biarritz	36	32	Racing Métro 92	2
1	Toulouse	23	22	Brive	1
2	La Rochelle	20	16	Montpellier	1
6	Toulon	39	17	Bourgoin	2
1	Stade Français	22	18	Agen	0
2	Castres	23	19	Clermont	2

Round 22

25–27 March

0	Castres	18	12	Toulon	0
1	La Rochelle	16	34	Perpignan	5
7	Brive	50	6	Bourgoin	0
2	Agen	26	17	Clermont	2
4	Biarritz	40	10	Bayonne	1
3	Racing Métro 92	43	21	Toulouse	0
2	Montpellier	29	23	Stade Français	1

Round 23

1 and 2 April

2	Perpignan	24	25	Toulouse	2
2	Bayonne	26	16	Racing Métro 92	1
3	Brive	26	9	La Rochelle	0
3	Bourgoin	27	42	Montpellier	5
4	Toulon	38	10	Stade Français	1
6	Clermont	41	13	Biarritz	2
2	Agen	21	16	Castres	1

Round 24

15 and 16 April

1	La Rochelle	19	29	Agen	2
0	Stade Français	12	20	Clermont	2
2	Perpignan	23	16	Racing Métro 92	1
1	Montpellier	17	22	Bayonne	3
8	Biarritz	52	26	Brive	4
4	Bourgoin	22	33	Castres	4
2	Toulon	21	9	Toulouse	0

Round 25

22 and 23 April

1	Castres	16	13	Biarritz	1
7	Racing Métro 92	51	34	Agen	4
7	Bayonne	54	20	Stade Français	2
5	Toulouse	33	0	Bourgoin	0
6	Clermont	34	10	La Rochelle	1
4	Toulon	43	12	Perpignan	0
2	Brive	23	21	Montpellier	2

Round 26

7 May

2	Perpignan	10	29	Castres	4
1	Stade Français	16	29	Racing Métro 92	3
2	Bourgoin	18	22	Biarritz	1
1	La Rochelle	17	30	Bayonne	3
6	Agen	36	10	Brive	1
3	Montpellier	27	3	Toulon	0
2	Toulouse	15	6	Clermont	0

== Playoffs ==
Quarterfinals
4	Clermont	27
5	Biarritz	17
3	Castres	17
6	Montpellier	18

Semifinals
1	Toulouse	29
4	Clermont	6
2	Racing Métro	25
6	Montpellier	26

Final
1	Toulouse	15
6	Montpellier	10

All times are in Central European Summer Time (UTC+2).

=== Quarter-finals ===
13 May 2011
21:00

Clermont	27 – 17	Biarritz
Try: James 57' c Lapandry 68' c Malzieu 73' c Con: Parra (2/2); James (1/1); Pen: Floch (1/1) 14'; Parra (1/2) 40+2'	Report	Try: Yachvili 30' c Peyrelongue 37' c Con: Yachvili (2/2); Pen: Yachvili (1/2) 20'

Stade Marcel-Michelin, Clermont-Ferrand
Attendance: 16,794
Referee: Jean-Luc Rebollal

14 May 2011
16:25

Castres	17 – 18	Montpellier
Try: Diarra 5' c Penalty try 40' c Con: Teulet (2/2); Pen: Teulet (1/4) 54'	Report	Pen: Bustos Moyano (6/7) 8', 29', 33', 44', 49', 71'

Stade Pierre-Antoine, Castres
Attendance: 10,012
Referee: Franck Maciello

=== Semi-finals ===
27 May 2011
21:00

Toulouse	29 – 6	Clermont
Try: Caucaunibuca (2) 8' c, 80+3' c Con: Skrela (1/1); Bézy (1/1); Pen: Skrela (4/4) 6', 22', 47', 54'; Bézy (1/4) 79'	Report	Pen: Floch (1/1) 15'; Parra (1/2) 35'

Stade Vélodrome, Marseille
Attendance: 56,676
Referee: Jérôme Garcès

28 May 2011
16:25

Racing Métro	25 – 26	Montpellier
Try: Bobo 52' m Wisniewski 62' c Qovu 76' c Con: Wisniewski (2/3); Pen: Steyn (1/1) 4'; Wisniewski (1/3) 16'	Report	Try: Mirande 33' c Fernández 42' c Con: Bustos Moyano (2/2); Pen: Bustos Moyano (4/5) 13', 19', 51', 79'

Stade Vélodrome, Marseille
Attendance: 56,855
Referee: Romain Poite

=== Final ===
4 June 2011
20:45

Toulouse	15 – 10	Montpellier
Pen: Skrela (3/8) 38', 47', 67'; Bézy (2/2) 70', 75'	Report	Try: Nagusa 26' c Con: Bustos Moyano (1/1); Drop: Trinh-Duc (1/3) 41'

Stade de France, Saint-Denis
Attendance: 77,000
Referee: Patrick Pechambert

FB	15	(France) Cédric Heymans	(substituted off) 49'
RW	14	(France) Maxime Médard
OC	13	(France) Yannick Jauzion	(substituted off) 61'
IC	12	(France) Clément Poitrenaud
LW	11	(Fiji) Rupeni Caucaunibuca	(substituted off) 65'
FH	10	(France) David Skrela	(substituted off) 67'
SH	9	(France) Jean-Marc Doussain
N8	8	(France) Louis Picamoles
OF	7	(France) Thierry Dusautoir (c)
BF	6	(France) Jean Bouilhou	(substituted off) 56'
RL	5	(Argentina) Patricio Albacete
LL	4	(France) Romain Millo-Chluski	(substituted off) 48'
TP	3	(Samoa) Census Johnston	(substituted off) 76'
HK	2	(France) William Servat	(substituted off) 31'
LP	1	(South Africa) Daan Human	(substituted off) 48'
Replacements:
HK	16	(France) Virgile Lacombe	(substituted in) 31'
PR	17	(France) Jean-Baptiste Poux	(substituted in) 48'
LK	18	(France) Yoann Maestri	(substituted in) 48'
FL	19	(France) Yannick Nyanga	(substituted in) 56'
FH	20	(France) Nicolas Bézy	(substituted in) 67'
CE	21	(France) Florian Fritz	(substituted in) 49'
WG	22	(France) Vincent Clerc	(substituted in) 65'
PR	23	(Samoa) Johnson Falefa	(substituted in) 76'
	Coach: (France) Guy Novès

FB	15	(France) Benjamin Thiéry
RW	14	(Fiji) Timoci Nagusa	(yellow card) 33' to 43' (substituted off) 58'
OC	13	(France) Sylvain Mirande	(substituted off) 68'
IC	12	(Argentina) Santiago Fernández
LW	11	(Argentina) Martín Bustos Moyano
FH	10	(France) François Trinh-Duc
SH	9	(France) Julien Tomas	(substituted off) 65'
N8	8	(Fiji) Sakiusa Matadigo
OF	7	(Georgia (country)) Mamuka Gorgodze
BF	6	(France) Fulgence Ouedraogo (c)	(substituted off) 67'
RL	5	(France) Aliki Fakaté	(substituted off) 53'
LL	4	(South Africa) Drikus Hancke
TP	3	(Georgia (country)) Giorgi Jgenti	(substituted off) 78'
HK	2	(Spain) Fabien Rofes	(substituted off) 53'
LP	1	(Argentina) Juan Figallo	(substituted off) 71' (substituted in) 78'
Replacements:
HK	16	(France) Joan Caudullo	(substituted in) 53'
PR	17	(Samoa) Na'ama Leleimalefaga	(substituted in) 71'
LK	18	(France) Mickaël de Marco	(substituted in) 53'
FL	19	(France) Vassili Bost	(substituted in) 67'
SH	20	(France) Benoît Paillaugue	(substituted in) 65' (yellow card) 74' to 80'
WG	21	(France) Pierre Bérard	(substituted in) 58'
CE	22	(South Africa) Grant Rees	(substituted in) 68'
PR	23	(South Africa) Danie Thiart
	Coach: (France) Fabien Galthié

== Individual statistics ==
Correct as of June 5, 2011

=== Top points scorers ===
Player	Team	Points
(France) Jonathan Wisniewski	Racing Métro	336
(France) Romain Teulet	Castres	326
(Argentina) Martín Bustos Moyano	Montpellier	283
(England) Jonny Wilkinson	Toulon	274
(France) Jérôme Porical	Perpignan	268
(France) Dimitri Yachvili	Biarritz	256
(France) Benjamin Boyet	Bayonne	233
(France) David Skrela	Toulouse	215
(France) Mathieu Bélie	Brive	197
(France) Julien Dupuy	Stade Français	179

=== Top try scorers ===
Player	Team	Tries
(France) Maxime Médard	Toulouse	15
(France) Yoann Huget	Bayonne	12
(France) Julien Malzieu	Clermont	11
(Fiji) Timoci Nagusa	Montpellier	11
(France) Marc Andreu	Castres	10
(United States) Takudzwa Ngwenya	Biarritz	9
(Samoa) Joe Tekori	Castres	9
(France) Yoan Audrin	Castres	8
(Fiji) Sireli Bobo	Racing Métro	8
(England) Ollie Phillips	Stade Français	8

== See also ==
- 2010–11 Rugby Pro D2 season
- 2010–11 Heineken Cup
- Match Attd
