= 2010–11 Rugby Pro D2 season =

French rugby season

2010–11 Pro D2
- Countries: France
- Date: 27 August 2010 – 22 May 2011
- Champions: Lyon
- Promoted: Lyon; Bordeaux-Bègles
- Relegated: Colomiers; Saint-Étienne
- Matches played: 243
- Attendance: 907,560 (average 3,735 per match)
- Tries scored: 744 (average 3.1 per match)
- Top point scorer: (New Zealand) Gerard Fraser (392)
- Top try scorer: (Fiji) Timoci Matanavu (19)

The 2010–11 Rugby Pro D2 was the season of the second-level French rugby union club competition, behind the Top 14, for the 2010–11 season. It runs alongside the 2010–11 Top 14 competition; both competitions are operated by the Ligue Nationale de Rugby (LNR).

Albi, who had become the first team to gain promotion back to the Top 14 only one year after being relegated in 2008, got immediately relegated again at the end of the previous Top 14 season. Bayonne finished second-to-bottom and were set to accompany Albi in Pro D2, but Montauban were revealed to have serious financial troubles and were relegated instead. A month later, the LNR's financial arm, DNACG, announced that Montauban would be further dropped to Fédérale 1, allowing Aix-en-Provence, who finished second-to-bottom in Pro D2, to stay. This meant that only the bottom finisher, Lannemezan, would be relegated to Fédérale 1 that year. Carcassonne and Saint-Étienne, last year's Fédérale 1 two finalists, gained promotion to Pro D2 for the first time in their history, whilst Agen and La Rochelle, respectively champions and promotion play-offs winners, were promoted to the Top 14.

Lyon, who lost the promotion final the previous year, established themselves as a candidate for the title from early on in the season along with recently relegated Albi. But whilst Albi struggled to keep their momentum after the Christmas break, Lyon managed to maintain their winning ways and held on to their top spot until the end of the season despite a remarkable finish by Grenoble, who had missed on a semi-final spot because of an unfavourable head-to-head against Pau the previous year, and who came back from a poor start to finish within two points of Lyon, the smallest margin between the top two teams since the establishment of the Pro D2, and seven points clear of Albi. In the promotion semi-finals, Albi saw off Mont-de-Marsan after extra time, while Grenoble couldn't capitalise on their home ground advantage and fell to fifth-placed Bordeaux-Bègles. In the final, Bordeaux-Bègles defeated Albi 21–14 to reach the Top 14 for the first time since Bordeaux and Bègles merged to form a new club in 2006.

The previous year's two losing semi-finalists, Oyonnax and Pau, both had disappointing seasons, finishing eighth and ninth, respectively. The two newly promoted teams, Carcassonne and Saint-Étienne, fared very differently. While Carcassonne enjoyed a very successful season, to the point that they looked like a credible candidate for the promotion playoffs for the first half of the season, ultimately finishing in tenth, Saint-Étienne had a nightmarish season, with a single win, one draw and twenty-eight losses, amounting to 17 points, the poorest-ever record in the Pro D2 (Lannemezan had finished with 19 points the previous year). Aix-en-Provence, who had been reprieved the previous year, looked like they were going to be part of a three-way battle with Dax and Colomiers to avoid the second relegation spot, but a string of victories in the second half of the season ensured that they would stay in Pro D2 for at least a third consecutive year. Dax and Colomiers fought until the last day, both finishing with 55 points, but a better head-to-head allowed Dax to clinch the coveted 14th spot, and sent Colomiers to Fédérale 1.

== Previous season ==
Location of teams in Rugby Pro D2 2010–11

Agen, who had been a favorite for promotion ever since they were relegated at the end of the 2006–07 season, finally lived up to the expectations and dominated the championship from the start, finishing with an 11-point margin over second-placed Lyon and thus earning promotion to the 2010–11 Top 14 season. Lyon and La Rochelle made the most of the home ground advantage to qualify for the promotion final with victories over Pau and Oyonnax, respectively, and faced each other in the final. La Rochelle, despite having lost both confrontations against Lyon during the regular season, triumphed 32–26 and earned the right to accompany Agen in the Top 14 after eight years spent in Pro D2.

The two newly promoted teams, Aix-en-Provence and Lannemezan, were not able to rival the other teams and from early on in the season occupied the bottom two places that they were to keep until the end. Lannemezan in particular finished with only three wins out of thirty games (one of which against arch-rivals Tarbes), amounting to 19 points, the poorest record in the Pro D2 since the introduction of the bonus points.

However, in a new twist of events, Montauban, who were already relegated to Pro D2 for financial reasons (thus saving Bayonne's spot in the Top 14), failed their audit on June 10, and were further relegated to Fédérale 1. Their decision not to appeal the DNACG's ruling also meant that Aix would be reprieved and compete again in Pro D2 for the next year.

== Competition format ==
The top team at the end of the regular season (after all the teams played one another twice, once at home, once away), is declared champion and earns a spot in the next Top 14 season. Teams ranked second to fifth compete in promotion playoffs, with the semifinals being played at the home ground of the higher-ranked team. The final is then played on neutral ground, and the winner earned the second ticket to the next Top 14.

The LNR uses a slightly different bonus points system from that used in most other rugby competitions. It trialled a new system in 2007–08 explicitly designed to prevent a losing team from earning more than one bonus point in a match, a system that also made it impossible for either team to earn a bonus point in a drawn match. LNR chose to continue with this system for subsequent seasons.

France's bonus point system operates as follows:

- 4 points for a win.
- 2 points for a draw.
- 1 "bonus" point for winning while scoring at least 3 more tries than the opponent. This replaces the standard bonus point for scoring 4 tries regardless of the match result.
- 1 "bonus" point for losing by 7 points (or less).

== Season table ==
Key to colors
Champions automatically promoted to Top 14
Winner of playoffs between second- through fifth-place teams for the second promotion place
Remaining participants in promotion playoffs
Bottom two teams relegated to Fédérale 1

2010–11 Rugby Pro D2 Table
	Club	Played	Won	Drawn	Lost	Points for	Points against	Diff	Bonus points	Points	Head-to-head
1	Lyon	30	21	2	7	705	448	+257	13	101	
2	Grenoble	30	19	4	7	767	505	+262	15	99	
3	Albi	30	19	3	8	674	524	+150	10	92	
4	Mont-de-Marsan	30	18	0	12	667	467	+200	14	86	
5	Bordeaux-Bègles	30	18	1	11	727	578	+149	10	84	
6	Auch	30	16	2	12	566	559	+7	11	79	
7	Aurillac	30	15	1	14	603	585	+18	8	70	
8	Oyonnax	30	13	3	14	579	539	+40	11	69	Oyonnax–Pau 5–5; Oyonnax 36–33
9	Pau	30	15	0	15	630	628	+2	9	69	Oyonnax–Pau 5–5; Oyonnax 36–33
10	Carcassonne	30	12	2	16	612	608	+4	14	66	
11	Aix-en-Provence	30	14	1	15	586	650	−64	5	63	
12	Tarbes	30	13	1	16	579	674	−95	8	62	
13	Narbonne	30	13	0	17	576	767	−191	8	60	
14	Dax	30	10	1	19	591	652	−61	13	55	Dax 6–4
15	Colomiers	30	10	4	16	488	678	−190	7	55	Dax 6–4
16	Saint-Étienne	30	1	1	28	434	922	−488	11	17	

== Results ==
=== Key ===
The score of the game is given by the middle (third and fourth) columns. The first and last columns indicate the number of tries scored by the home and the away team, respectively. A blue border indicates that the team has earned an attacking bonus point (i.e. has scored at least three more tries than its opponent), a yellow one that the team has earned a defensive bonus point (defeat by 7 points or less). If a team earns both bonus points, this will be indicated by a green border.

Round 1

27–29 August

0	Bordeaux-Bègles	15	20	Colomiers	1
0	Grenoble	9	12	Mont-de-Marsan	0
1	Auch	25	26	Carcassonne	1
2	Aurillac	36	13	Dax	1
1	Lyon	22	9	Aix-en-Provence	0
3	Narbonne	34	29	Tarbes	2
6	Albi	45	19	Saint-Étienne	1
1	Pau	20	19	Oyonnax	1

Round 2

4 and 5 September

1	Saint-Étienne	7	47	Oyonnax	6
1	Colomiers	16	12	Mont-de-Marsan	0
2	Pau	22	16	Auch	1
1	Bordeaux-Bègles	22	15	Aurillac	0
1	Tarbes	25	19	Grenoble	1
1	Carcassonne	19	21	Lyon	0
0	Aix-en-Provence	18	11	Narbonne	1
1	Dax	13	28	Albi	3

Round 3

11 and 12 September

4	Mont-de-Marsan	35	11	Auch	1
2	Oyonnax	26	9	Bordeaux-Bègles	0
3	Grenoble	31	18	Carcassonne	0
3	Lyon	28	13	Dax	1
3	Aurillac	36	9	Aix-en-Provence	0
0	Tarbes	24	30	Albi	2
3	Colomiers	33	19	Pau	1
2	Narbonne	15	24	Saint-Étienne	0

Round 4

18 and 19 September

1	Aurillac	28	16	Pau	1
1	Grenoble	16	16	Bordeaux-Bègles	1
3	Oyonnax	33	9	Carcassonne	0
4	Dax	31	16	Colomiers	1
2	Auch	29	12	Aix-en-Provence	0
4	Albi	34	8	Narbonne	1
4	Saint-Étienne	38	43	Tarbes	3
0	Mont-de-Marsan	15	22	Lyon	1

Round 5

25 and 26 September

2	Narbonne	24	13	Mont-de-Marsan	2
4	Carcassonne	30	6	Aurillac	0
1	Dax	26	14	Oyonnax	2
3	Aix-en-Provence	21	36	Grenoble	5
0	Tarbes	18	14	Auch	1
2	Colomiers	23	23	Saint-Étienne	2
2	Pau	18	22	Albi	1
0	Bordeaux-Bègles	18	12	Lyon	0

Round 6

9 and 10 October

1	Albi	22	17	Mont-de-Marsan	1
1	Pau	17	12	Narbonne	0
1	Saint-Étienne	16	48	Bordeaux-Bègles	6
1	Auch	19	17	Dax	1
2	Aix-en-Provence	29	3	Colomiers	0
3	Oyonnax	20	25	Aurillac	1
1	Carcassonne	13	12	Tarbes	0
5	Lyon	39	20	Grenoble	2

Round 7

16 and 17 October

8	Mont-de-Marsan	60	10	Saint-Étienne	1
0	Tarbes	21	22	Pau	1
2	Narbonne	36	29	Carcassonne	2
1	Dax	14	30	Aix-en-Provence	3
1	Aurillac	22	9	Lyon	0
0	Auch	18	15	Oyonnax	0
5	Grenoble	36	6	Colomiers	0
5	Bordeaux-Bègles	47	9	Albi	0

Round 8

23 and 24 October

2	Mont-de-Marsan	17	26	Tarbes	2
1	Aix-en-Provence	17	19	Bordeaux-Bègles	1
3	Oyonnax	28	10	Narbonne	1
3	Lyon	27	8	Auch	1
0	Colomiers	6	19	Aurillac	1
1	Saint-Étienne	19	26	Pau	2
2	Carcassonne	23	19	Dax	2
0	Grenoble	18	12	Albi	0

Round 9

30 and 31 October

1	Carcassonne	16	12	Mont-de-Marsan	0
1	Pau	25	15	Bordeaux-Bègles	0
5	Dax	37	11	Saint-Étienne	1
2	Albi	21	10	Oyonnax	1
1	Narbonne	25	19	Grenoble	1
3	Lyon	25	18	Colomiers	0
0	Aurillac	15	6	Auch	0
1	Tarbes	20	9	Aix-en-Provence	0

Round 10

6 and 7 November

1	Mont-de-Marsan	22	6	Aix-en-Provence	0
3	Pau	19	32	Carcassonne	4
1	Oyonnax	14	0	Tarbes	0
2	Narbonne	32	27	Lyon	3
1	Auch	22	19	Grenoble	1
1	Colomiers	19	20	Albi	1
4	Bordeaux-Bègles	36	17	Dax	2
0	Saint-Étienne	15	19	Aurillac	1

Round 11

20 and 21 November

3	Mont-de-Marsan	28	0	Pau	0
1	Carcassonne	19	14	Bordeaux-Bègles	1
2	Tarbes	26	6	Dax	0
0	Aix-en-Provence	9	3	Saint-Étienne	0
0	Aurillac	18	23	Narbonne	2
1	Grenoble	19	16	Oyonnax	1
0	Colomiers	12	6	Auch	0
1	Albi	20	15	Lyon	0

Round 12

27 and 28 November

2	Aix-en-Provence	24	17	Carcassonne	1
5	Lyon	39	13	Tarbes	1
6	Grenoble	43	6	Saint-Étienne	0
0	Auch	12	6	Narbonne	0
0	Oyonnax	12	12	Colomiers	0
2	Albi	26	16	Aurillac	1
1	Bordeaux-Bègles	20	13	Mont-de-Marsan	1
0	Dax	9	12	Pau	0

Round 13

4 and 5 December

1	Colomiers	13	12	Tarbes	0
3	Narbonne	27	28	Bordeaux-Bègles	1
3	Pau	28	26	Aix-en-Provence	1
8	Carcassonne	50	14	Saint-Étienne	2
2	Auch	32	32	Albi	2
0	Aurillac	15	16	Grenoble	1
0	Mont-de-Marsan	24	13	Dax	1
0	Oyonnax	9	9	Lyon	0

Round 14

11 and 12 December

0	Pau	3	15	Lyon	0
2	Tarbes	27	16	Bordeaux-Bègles	1
1	Aix-en-Provence	20	6	Oyonnax	0
0	Carcassonne	15	22	Albi	1
1	Mont-de-Marsan	17	6	Aurillac	0
1	Dax	13	23	Grenoble	2
0	Saint-Étienne	9	10	Auch	1
1	Colomiers	19	24	Narbonne	2

Round 15

18 and 19 December

0	Oyonnax	15	9	Mont-de-Marsan	0
3	Bordeaux-Bègles	28	23	Auch	2
4	Carcassonne	32	9	Colomiers	0
0	Narbonne	12	18	Dax	0
2	Albi	23	6	Aix-en-Provence	0
3	Tarbes	28	21	Aurillac	2
5	Lyon	37	0	Saint-Étienne	0
3	Grenoble	21	13	Pau	1

Round 16

8 and 9 January

1	Oyonnax	17	13	Pau	1
2	Colomiers	15	19	Bordeaux-Bègles	1
1	Aix-en-Provence	16	34	Lyon	4
1	Carcassonne	10	16	Auch	1
3	Tarbes	27	8	Narbonne	1
0	Dax	24	15	Aurillac	0
1	Saint-Étienne	13	16	Albi	1
3	Mont-de-Marsan	30	19	Grenoble	3

Round 17

15 and 16 January

0	Lyon	15	12	Carcassonne	0
0	Albi	21	24	Dax	3
3	Oyonnax	30	10	Saint-Étienne	1
4	Narbonne	50	22	Aix-en-Provence	1
3	Auch	27	18	Pau	0
1	Mont-de-Marsan	19	6	Colomiers	0
3	Aurillac	25	16	Bordeaux-Bègles	1
5	Grenoble	37	10	Tarbes	1

Round 18

22 and 23 January; 20 March

2	Auch	24	15	Mont-de-Marsan	0
8	Pau	60	12	Colomiers	0
0	Carcassonne	18	22	Grenoble	3
1	Aix-en-Provence	31	12	Aurillac	0
6	Albi	45	18	Tarbes	2
3	Dax	29	36	Lyon	3
4	Bordeaux-Bègles	35	7	Oyonnax	1
0	Saint-Étienne	12	14	Narbonne	

Round 19

29 and 30 January

3	Lyon	25	18	Mont-de-Marsan	0
3	Pau	28	13	Aurillac	1
0	Carcassonne	12	12	Oyonnax	0
0	Aix-en-Provence	9	9	Auch	0
2	Tarbes	32	24	Saint-Étienne	3
0	Narbonne	6	3	Albi	0
1	Bordeaux-Bègles	25	22	Grenoble	1
0	Colomiers	12	9	Dax	0

Round 20

5 and 6 February

3	Mont-de-Marsan	34	6	Narbonne	0
2	Saint-Étienne	18	24	Colomiers	2
2	Albi	26	29	Pau	2
5	Aurillac	41	21	Carcassonne	2
2	Oyonnax	18	12	Dax	0
10	Grenoble	67	18	Aix-en-Provence	2
0	Auch	15	12	Tarbes	0
0	Lyon	21	13	Bordeaux-Bègles	1

Round 21

19 and 20 February

1	Narbonne	22	24	Pau	2
4	Bordeaux-Bègles	27	3	Saint-Étienne	0
0	Tarbes	15	10	Carcassonne	1
0	Dax	18	13	Auch	1
2	Aurillac	30	25	Oyonnax	1
0	Colomiers	12	18	Aix-en-Provence	0
0	Grenoble	12	12	Lyon	0
1	Mont-de-Marsan	22	10	Albi	1

Round 22

26 and 27 February

3	Pau	24	27	Tarbes	2
4	Carcassonne	39	5	Narbonne	1
3	Lyon	33	8	Aurillac	1
2	Albi	27	8	Bordeaux-Bègles	1
1	Saint-Étienne	10	31	Mont-de-Marsan	4
3	Aix-en-Provence	28	13	Dax	1
0	Oyonnax	15	12	Auch	0
1	Colomiers	22	22	Grenoble	1

Round 23

5 and 6 March

1	Tarbes	22	18	Mont-de-Marsan	0
5	Pau	48	25	Saint-Étienne	1
0	Bordeaux-Bègles	18	23	Aix-en-Provence	1
0	Dax	21	21	Carcassonne	0
1	Narbonne	25	24	Oyonnax	2
1	Auch	25	18	Lyon	0
5	Aurillac	37	24	Colomiers	4
1	Albi	16	16	Grenoble	1

Round 24

11 and 12 March

3	Aix-en-Provence	23	0	Tarbes	0
1	Oyonnax	14	15	Albi	2
5	Grenoble	34	15	Narbonne	2
0	Auch	18	6	Aurillac	0
2	Bordeaux-Bègles	18	14	Pau	1
1	Mont-de-Marsan	17	13	Carcassonne	1
1	Saint-Étienne	10	16	Dax	1
1	Colomiers	22	19	Lyon	1

Round 25

25 and 26 March

0	Aix-en-Provence	30	15	Mont-de-Marsan	0
1	Carcassonne	16	22	Pau	1
2	Dax	24	26	Bordeaux-Bègles	2
0	Tarbes	15	19	Oyonnax	1
2	Aurillac	21	18	Saint-Étienne	2
5	Albi	34	15	Colomiers	0
7	Lyon	45	12	Narbonne	2
3	Grenoble	37	6	Auch	0

Round 26

2 and 3 April

1	Pau	16	22	Mont-de-Marsan	3
4	Bordeaux-Bègles	40	23	Carcassonne	2
2	Dax	26	7	Tarbes	1
2	Narbonne	23	26	Aurillac	1
1	Oyonnax	19	26	Grenoble	2
4	Auch	37	7	Colomiers	1
1	Saint-Étienne	22	29	Aix-en-Provence	2
1	Lyon	25	12	Albi	0

Round 27

9 and 10 April

5	Pau	40	20	Dax	2
2	Carcassonne	26	12	Aix-en-Provence	2
1	Tarbes	8	15	Lyon	0
1	Narbonne	34	28	Auch	1
2	Colomiers	20	13	Oyonnax	1
0	Aurillac	6	6	Albi	0
1	Mont-de-Marsan	23	13	Bordeaux-Bègles	1
2	Saint-Étienne	15	42	Grenoble	6

Round 28

15 and 16 April

2	Tarbes	20	20	Colomiers	1
5	Bordeaux-Bègles	41	17	Narbonne	2
0	Dax	12	19	Mont-de-Marsan	1
0	Albi	21	22	Auch	1
1	Grenoble	13	10	Aurillac	1
2	Aix-en-Provence	26	19	Pau	2
1	Saint-Étienne	7	23	Carcassonne	2
0	Lyon	18	19	Oyonnax	1

Round 29

30 April and 1 May

1	Lyon	19	9	Pau	0
2	Aurillac	21	28	Mont-de-Marsan	3
7	Bordeaux-Bègles	50	23	Tarbes	2
5	Albi	31	5	Carcassonne	1
6	Oyonnax	39	29	Aix-en-Provence	4
4	Auch	34	19	Saint-Etienne	1
1	Narbonne	23	17	Colomiers	1
4	Grenoble	31	24	Dax	2

Round 30

8 May

7	Mont-de-Marsan	48	24	Oyonnax	3
0	Pau	6	22	Grenoble	3
2	Auch	29	27	Bordeaux-Bègles	3
5	Colomiers	35	15	Carcassonne	2
8	Dax	60	17	Narbonne	2
0	Aix-en-Provence	24	25	Albi	1
4	Aurillac	35	21	Tarbes	3
1	Saint-Etienne	14	23	Lyon	2

== Promotion playoffs ==
All times CEST.

=== Semi-finals ===
14 May 2011
14:00

Albi	21 – 16 (a.e.t.)	Mont-de-Marsan
Try: Guitoune 5' c Vainqueur 95' m Con: Manca (1/2); Pen: Manca (3/3) 11', 67', 90'		Try: Taulanga 52' c Con: Vignau-Tuquet (1/1); Pen: Vignau-Tuquet (2/5) 33', 75'; Drop: Vignau-Tuquet 85'

Stadium Municipal, Albi
Attendance: 9,000
Referee: Mathieu Raynal

15 May 2011
15:10

Grenoble	12 – 19	Bordeaux-Bègles
Pen: Dalla Riva (4/5) 11', 34', 51', 78'		Try: Carballo 16' c Con: Fraser (1/1); Pen: Fraser (4/5) 24', 47', 65', 68'

Stade Lesdiguières, Grenoble
Attendance: 11,000
Referee: Pascal Gauzère

=== Final ===
22 May 2011
15:10

Albi	14 – 21	Bordeaux-Bègles
Try: van der Westhuyzen 36' m Pen: Manca (3/4) 4', 12', 68'		Try: Rey 52' c Lilo 65' m Con: Fraser (1/2); Pen: Fraser (3/5) 7', 18', 24'

Stade Armandie, Agen
Attendance: 13,221
Referee: Christophe Berdos

== Individual statistics ==
=== Top points scorers ===
Player	Team	Points
(New Zealand) Gerard Fraser	Bordeaux	392
(France) Frédéric Manca	Albi	384
(France) Antoine Lescamel	Aix-en-Provence	369
(France) Pierre-Alexandre Dut	Auch	306
(France) Christopher Ruiz	Narbonne	304
(France) Maxime Petitjean	Aurillac	267
(France) Antoine Vignau-Tuquet	Mont-de-Marsan	266
(France) Fabien Fortassin	Tarbes	237

=== Top try scorers ===
Player	Team	Tries
(Fiji) Timoci Matanavu	Mont-de-Marsan	19
(Tonga) Vunga Lilo	Bordeaux	13
(France) Dave Vainqueur	Albi	13
(Fiji) Jone Daunivucu	Grenoble	12
(France) Benoit Lazzarotto	Carcassonne	10
(France) Sofiane Guitoune	Albi	9
(France) Bruno Hiriart	Pau	9
(South Africa) Wylie Human	Grenoble	9

== See also ==
- 2010–11 Top 14 season
