= Fabio da Silva Lopes =

Portuguese rugby union player

Fabio Da Silva Lopes
- Born: Fabio da Silva Lopes; January 9, 1986 (age 40) Portugal
- Height: 1.70 m (5 ft 7 in)
- Weight: 77 kg (170 lb)

Rugby union career
- Position: Scrum-half
Senior career
| Years | Team | Apps | (Points) |
| 2005-2008 | Lyon | 42 | (5) |
| 2008-2009 | Villeurbanne | 20 | (18) |
| 2009-2011 | Saint-Étienne | 41 | (20) |
| 2011-present | Bourgoin | 68 | (50) |

Fabio da Silva Lopes, commonly known as Fabio da Silva (born 9 January 1986), is a Portuguese rugby union football player. He plays as a Scrum-half.

He made his club debut in France where he played for Lyon from 2005 till 2008 where he signed for Villeurbanne for a season before moving to Saint-Étienne for 2 seasons. He currently plays for Bourgoin as of 2011 and has played 25 games for them scoring 4 tries.
