= Timoci Matanavou =

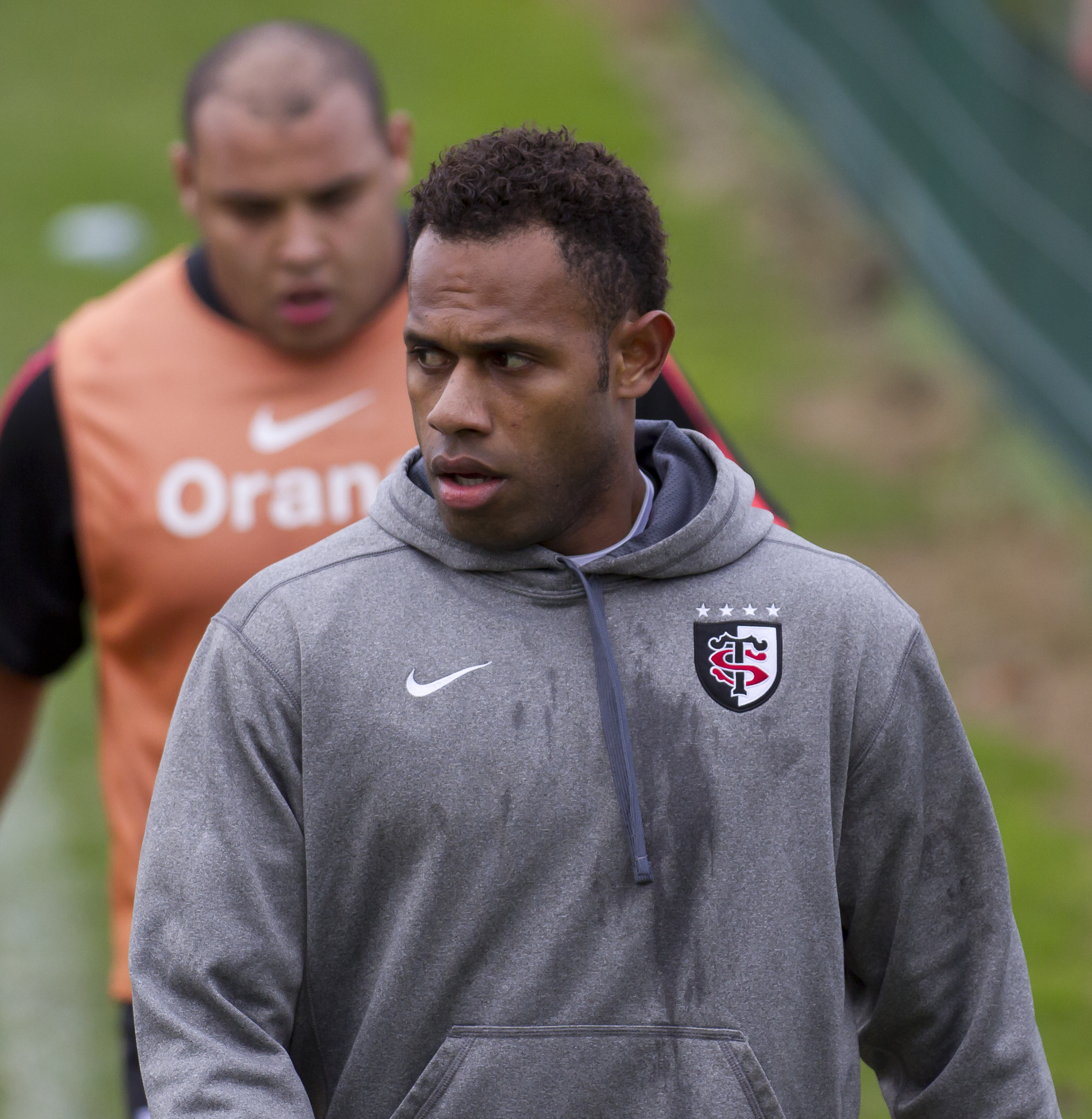
- Born: 8 July 1984 (age 42) Lautoka, Fiji
- Height: 1.86 m (6 ft 1 in)
- Weight: 78 kg (12 st 4 lb; 172 lb)

Rugby union career
- Position: Wing
Senior career
Years	Team	Apps	(Points)
2008-11	Montois	60	(157)
2011-2016	Toulouse	81	(155 (31t))
2016-2017	Perpignan		
2017-2018	Montois		(11 (15))
- Correct as of 27 April 2016
International career
Years	Team	Apps	(Points)
2012-	Fiji	3	(0)

Timoci Matanavou (born 8 July 1984 in Lautoka, Fiji) is a Fijian rugby union player. He plays as a wing. He plays for Stade Toulousain in the Top 14 competition.

== International ==
Matanavou attracted the attention of Fiji Rugby Sevens team selectors with a strong performance in a local sevens tournament in 2008. He was included into the Fiji's Sevens team and he made his debut at the Hong Kong Sevens in the 2007–08 IRB Sevens World Series.

Matanavou played for the Fiji national team (15s) during the November 2012 tests, and he scored a try in a friendly between Fiji and Gloucester He made his official test debut the following week in a match between Fiji and Ireland XV when he entered as a substitute.

== Club ==
Matanavou's performance for Fiji saw him get picked by Mont-de-Marsan, a Top 14 team in France for the 2008–09 Top 14 season. In August 2008, he made his debut on the right wing against US Montauban. He scored his first try in February 2009, against Bayonne. He scored just three tries that season and Mont-de-Marsan was demoted to Pro D2 competition for finishing last. The following season in the ProD2, he managed 9 tries. The following year, in the 2010–11 Rugby Pro D2 season, he finished as the overall top try scorer with 19 tries in 28 appearances.

His performance impressed Guy Noves, the Stade Toulouse coach who included the winger in his team for the 2011–12 Top 14 season. In the 2011-12 Top 14 season he finished tied for second in try scoring with 10 tries scored. He was the leading try scorer in the 2011–12 Heineken Cup with 8 tries.

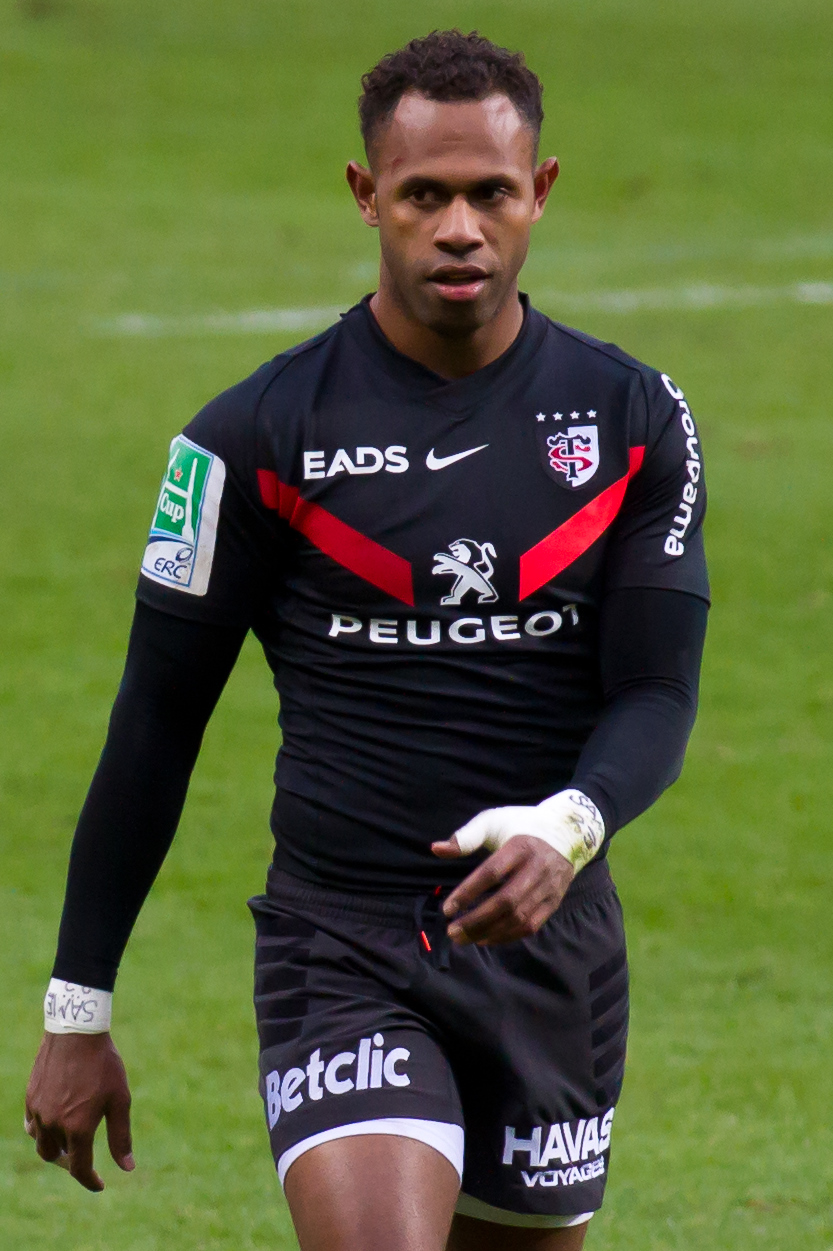
Matanavou against Harelquins

== Personal ==
Matanavou is the first cousin of Racing Metro 92 winger, Sireli Bobo. He is married to Fane Raibevu Matanavou and has two kids Pierre Yves and Melissa Matanavou
