= Rupeni Caucaunibuca =

Fijian rugby union player (born 1980)

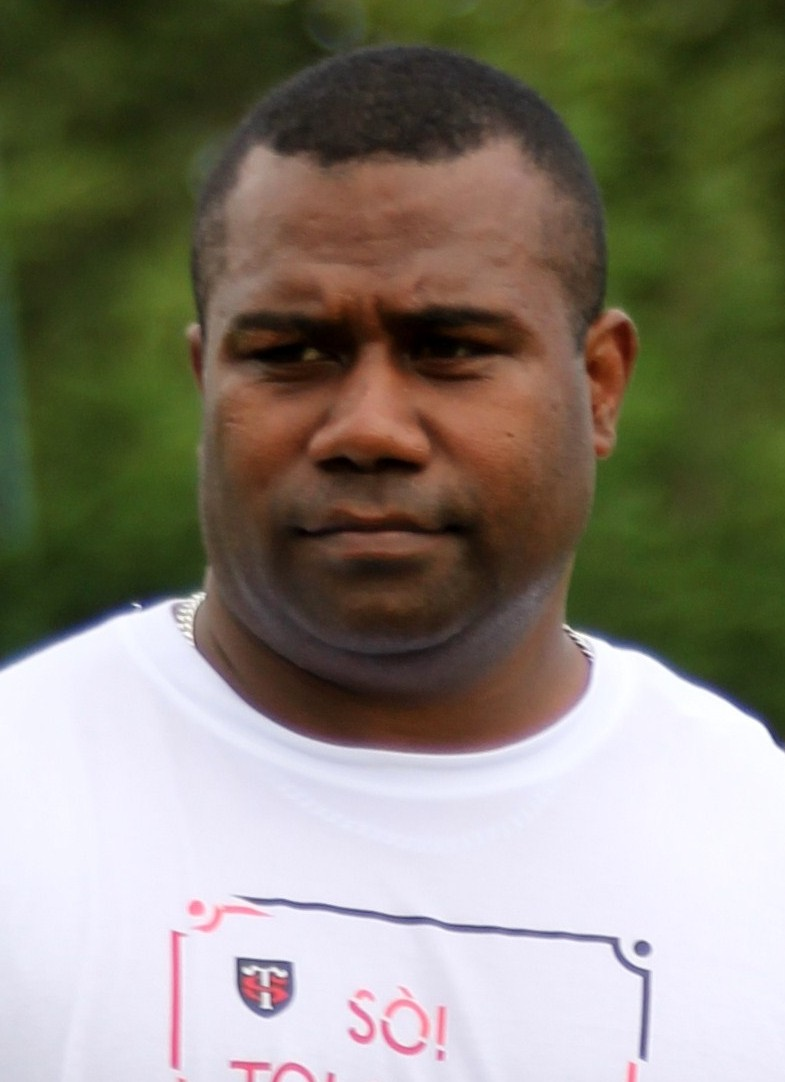
- Caucaunibuca during a Toulouse training session, July 2011
- Born: 5 June 1980 (age 46) Bua Province, Fiji
- Height: 181 cm (5 ft 11 in)
- Weight: 110 kg (243 lb; 17 st 5 lb)
- School: Bucalevu Secondary School

Rugby union career
- Position(s): Wing, Centre
Senior career
Years	Team	Apps	(Points)
2001–2013	Northland	21	(85)
2002–2004	Blues	14	(75)
2004–2014	Agen	111	(325)
2010–2011	Toulouse	13	(25)
- Correct as of 21 August 2019
International career
Years	Team	Apps	(Points)
2002	New Zealand Barbarians	1	(5)
2003–2010	Fiji	7	(45)
2006	Pacific Islanders	1	(5)
2010	French Barbarians	1	(5)
- Correct as of 21 August 2019
National sevens team
Years	Team		Comps
2001	Fiji		5 (194)
- Correct as of 21 August 2019
Medal record
Men's rugby sevens
Representing Fiji
Commonwealth Games
Silver medal – second place	2002 Manchester	Team

Rupeni Caucaunibuca (/ruːˈpɛniː ˈðaʊðaʊnɪmˈbuːðɑː/; born 5 June 1980), nicknamed the "Bua Bullet", is a Fijian former rugby union winger. He played for Fiji and had club careers in New Zealand and France, chiefly with Agen. He drew wide attention at the 2003 Rugby World Cup with solo tries against France and Scotland, and several coaches and journalists later rated him among the most dangerous attacking players of his era. His career was interrupted by disciplinary bans, injury and illness. After retiring in 2014 he returned to Fiji, where a 2019 documentary reported that he was living in poverty.

== Early life ==
Caucaunibuca grew up in Bua Province, in the north of Fiji. His father was a missionary who moved often, and the family had little money. He broke into the Fiji sevens team in 2000. Despite playing in only five of the nine tournaments of the 2000–01 World Sevens Series, he led the side with 38 tries. He won a silver medal with the Fiji sevens team at the 2002 Commonwealth Games in Manchester, where New Zealand beat Fiji 33–15 in the final.

== Career ==
Caucaunibuca played wing for Fiji and for club sides in New Zealand and France, including Super Rugby's Blues and the provincial side Northland.

He came to wider notice at the 2003 Rugby World Cup. Against France, he took a long cut-out pass just outside his own 22 and beat his opposite number Aurélien Rougerie and the covering defence to score under the posts. In Fiji's final Pool B match against Scotland, he scored two solo tries, one finishing down the left touchline and one starting from near his own 22; Scotland won the match 22–20 to eliminate Fiji. Writing in The Sunday Times, the rugby correspondent Stephen Jones later described him as one of the finest attacking players in the game.

After the World Cup, he stated his intention of switching allegiances from Fiji to New Zealand, in order to play rugby for New Zealand. Caucaunibuca was prevented from doing this by the eligibility rules, which tied him to Fiji following his previous appearances for them. The IRB failed to amend the eligibility rules (and New Zealand separately stated they had not approached him about this transfer), and Caucaunibuca continued to play for Fiji.

In 2005 Caucaunibuca missed a flight to a Test against Samoa, later saying he had stayed in Fiji with his wife, who had a toothache. The Fiji Rugby Union imposed a twelve-month ban. The ban was lifted early in May 2006. On his return he played in a 17–35 loss to the Junior All Blacks in Suva, and later scored in a 29–18 win over Italy.

He was named in the Pacific Islanders rugby union team for the 2006 tour of Europe, playing only against Scotland, in which he scored one try and set up another for Daniel Leo. In October 2006 he was named French championship player of the year at the LNR Nuit du Rugby, on the strength of being the top try-scorer in the French league for two seasons.

On 9 April 2007 Caucaunibuca was given a three-month ban after testing positive for cannabis following an Agen Top 14 match against Montauban on 24 March. Although the ban did not rule him out of the 2007 Rugby World Cup, he was not selected for the tournament.

He was released by Agen in February 2008 after a series of injuries. He returned to Fiji and played for his local side, Tailevu, in the Digicel Cup, before rejoining Agen for the 2008–09 season. On 13 June 2009 he said he would no longer make himself available for Fiji, before reversing that position in March 2010 with a stated aim of playing at the 2011 Rugby World Cup.

In the 2009–10 Rugby Pro D2 season he helped Agen win promotion to the Top 14. In October 2010 he joined Toulouse as a medical joker, covering the injured centre Yann David. Later in 2010 he was selected in the French Barbarians squad.

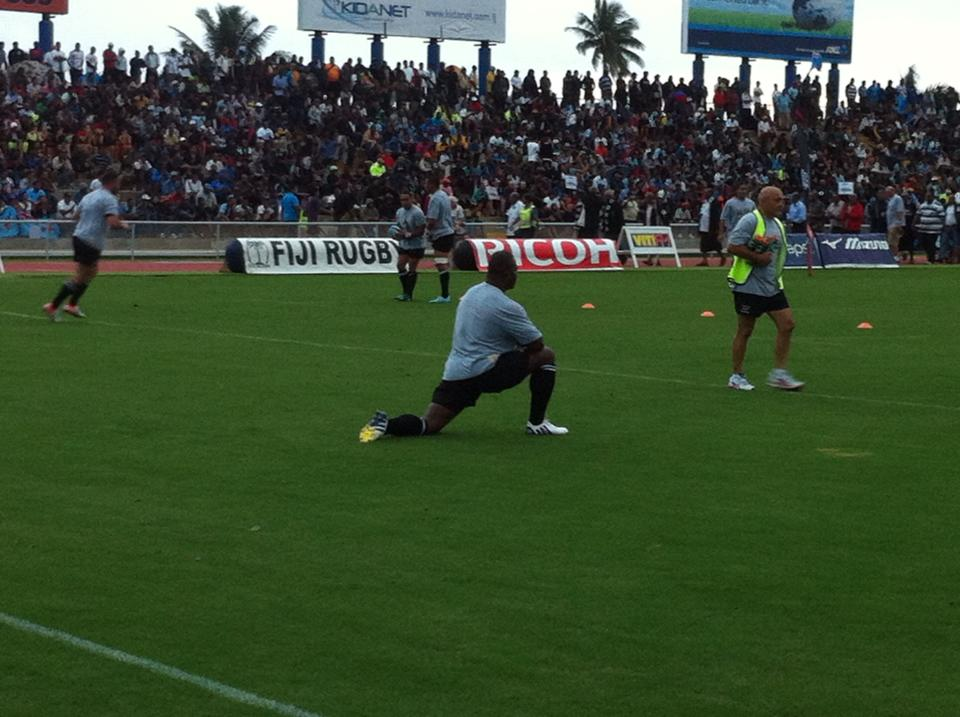
Caucaunibuca warming up before the Fiji–Classic All Blacks centenary match, 2013

In March 2013 he rejoined Northland, and was named in the Classic All Blacks side to play Fiji in their centenary match that June.

In late 2014 Caucaunibuca left second-division Agen and moved to Sri Lanka to pursue a place in Fiji's sevens squad for the 2016 Olympics. The move was short-lived, and he returned to his village in Fiji. In 2019, in the documentary Oceans Apart, he said he had been living in poverty since finishing with Agen, having spent most of his earnings on alcohol and on helping family and friends.

== International statistics ==
Test appearances (including replacements) and tries
Team	Year	Friendlies		World Cup		Total	
		Apps+subs	Tries	Apps+subs	Tries	Apps+subs	Tries
Fiji	2003	2+0	5	2+0	3	4+0	8
Fiji	2004	0+0	0	NA	NA	0+0	0
Fiji	2005	0+0	0	NA	NA	0+0	0
Fiji	2006	2+0	1	NA	NA	2+0	1
Pacific Islanders	2006	1+0	1	NA	NA	1+0	1
Fiji	2007	0+0	0	0+0	0	0+0	0
Fiji	2008	0+0	0	NA	NA	0+0	0
Fiji	2009	0+0	0	NA	NA	0+0	0
Fiji	2010	1+0	0	NA	NA	1+0	0
Fiji	2011	0+0	0	0+0	0	0+0	0

== Club statistics ==
Club appearances (including replacements) and tries by season
League	Club	Season	Apps+subs	Tries
Super Rugby	Blues	2002	1+0	2
Super Rugby	Blues	2003	8+0	8
Super Rugby	Blues	2004	4+0	5
Top 14	Agen	2004–05	23+2	16
Top 14	Agen	2005–06	20+3	17
Top 14	Agen	2006–07	11+0	1
Pro D2	Agen	2007–08	3+0	3
Pro D2	Agen	2008–09	15+1	12
Pro D2	Agen	2009–10	19+4	13
Top 14	Toulouse	2010–11	6+0	4

== Honours ==
Fiji sevens

- Commonwealth Games rugby sevens: silver medal, 2002

Individual

- Top 14 top try-scorer: 2005–06
- French championship player of the year (LNR Nuit du Rugby): 2006

== See also ==
- List of sportspeople sanctioned for doping offences
