= Montluçon Rugby =

French rugby union team

Montluçon Rugby is a French rugby union team, from the city of Montluçon. They play in Fédérale 1.
