= Gerard Fraser =

NZ rugby union player

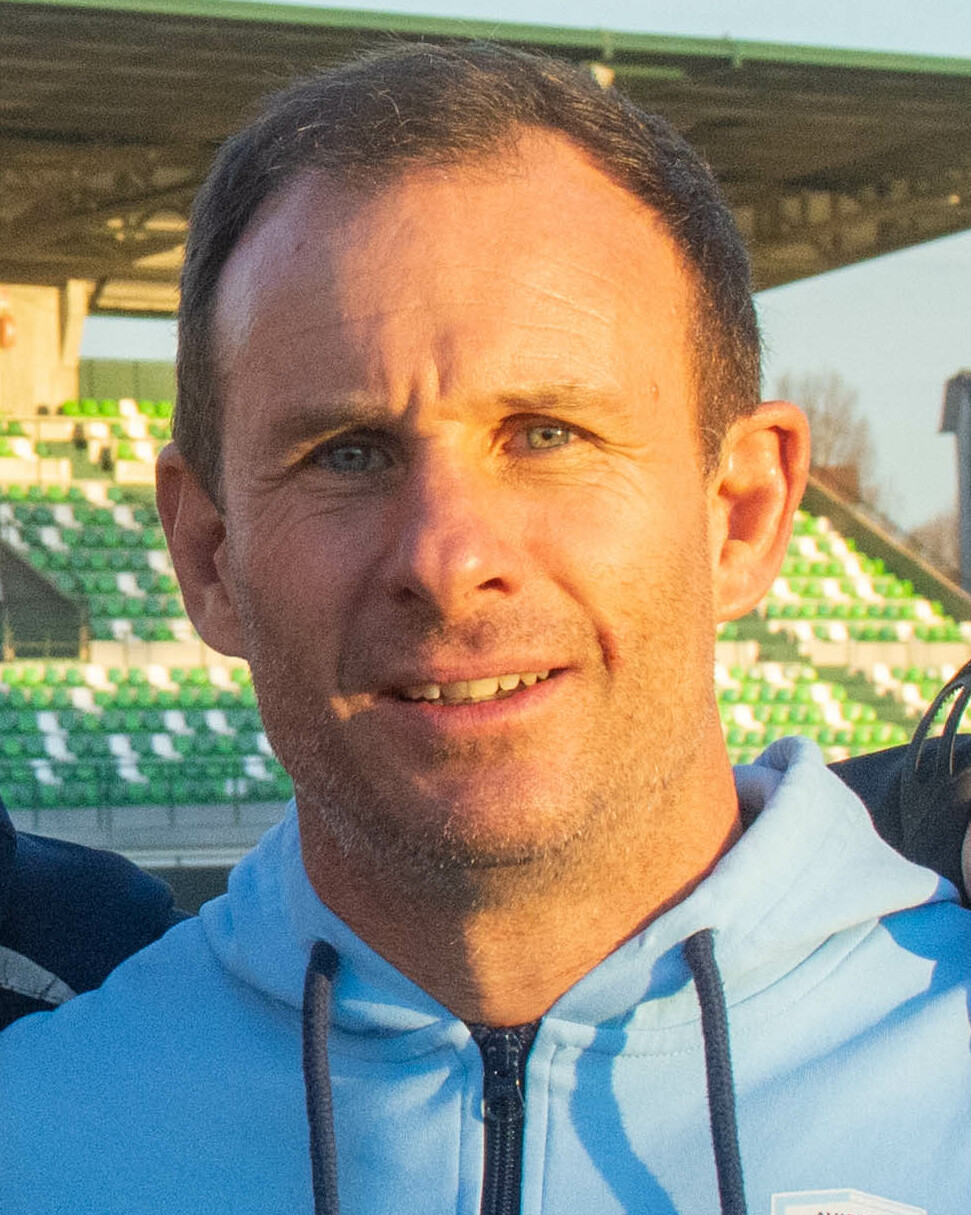
- Born: Gerard Fraser; 5 November 1978 (age 48) Rangiora, New Zealand
- Height: 180 cm (5 ft 11 in)
- Weight: 86 kg (13 st 8 lb)

Rugby union career
- Position: Fly-half
Senior career
Years	Team	Apps	(Points)
2001	Crusaders		
2002–2005	Calvisano		
2005–2007	Bayonne		
2007–2009	Calvisano		
2009–2010	L'Aquila Rugby		
2010-2012	Bordeaux		
2012-2013	AS Béziers		
2013-2014	RO Grasse		
Coaching career
- Years: Team
- 2014-2012/2015: RO Grasse
- 2012/2015-2018: Provence Rugby
- 2018-2022: RC Vannes
- 2022–2026: Aviron Bayonnais (assistant)
- 2026–: Aviron Bayonnais

Gerard Fraser (born 5 November 1978) in Rangiora, New Zealand is a former rugby union player and coach who is currently the head coach of the Aviron Bayonnais. As a player, he played as a fly-half.

With stiff competition coming from the likes of Andrew Mehrtens, Aaron Mauger and Dan Carter for the Crusaders, he decided to go into exile in Europe where he started with the Italian club Rugby Calvisano.

He signed with Rugby Calvisano in 2002 where he played a vital part in their domestic title (Coppa Italia) win in 2003 and also their winning of the Super 10 in 2005 & 2008.

From there he played two season for Aviron Bayonnais before moving to L'Aquila Rugby in 2009, where he scored 160 points in 13 games (including 6 tries).

In April 2010, it was announced that he had signed to the French Pro D2 team, Union Bordeaux Bègles. In the 2010–11 Rugby Pro D2 season, he constantly remained in the top 5 point scorers in the competition reaching over 320 points as Bordeaux won promotion to the Top 14.
