= Stade Etivallière =

Sports stadium located in Saint-Étienne, France

- Interactive map of Stade Etivallière
- Full name: Stade de l'Étivallière
- Location: Saint-Étienne, France
- Coordinates: 45°27′42″N 4°23′13″E
- Owner: City of Saint-Étienne
- Capacity: 3,000 (1,250 formal seats)
- Surface: grass

Construction
- Renovated: 2010

Tenant
- CA Saint-Étienne

Stade Etivallière is a sports stadium located in Saint-Étienne, France. It hosts the matches of CA Saint-Étienne of the Rugby Pro D2. It has a current capacity of 3,000 leading to the club occasionally playing bigger matches at the larger Stade Geoffroy-Guichard, home of AS Saint-Étienne.

Now it mainly holds the games of AS Saint-Étienne women team.
