= Nicolas Bézy =

French rugby union player

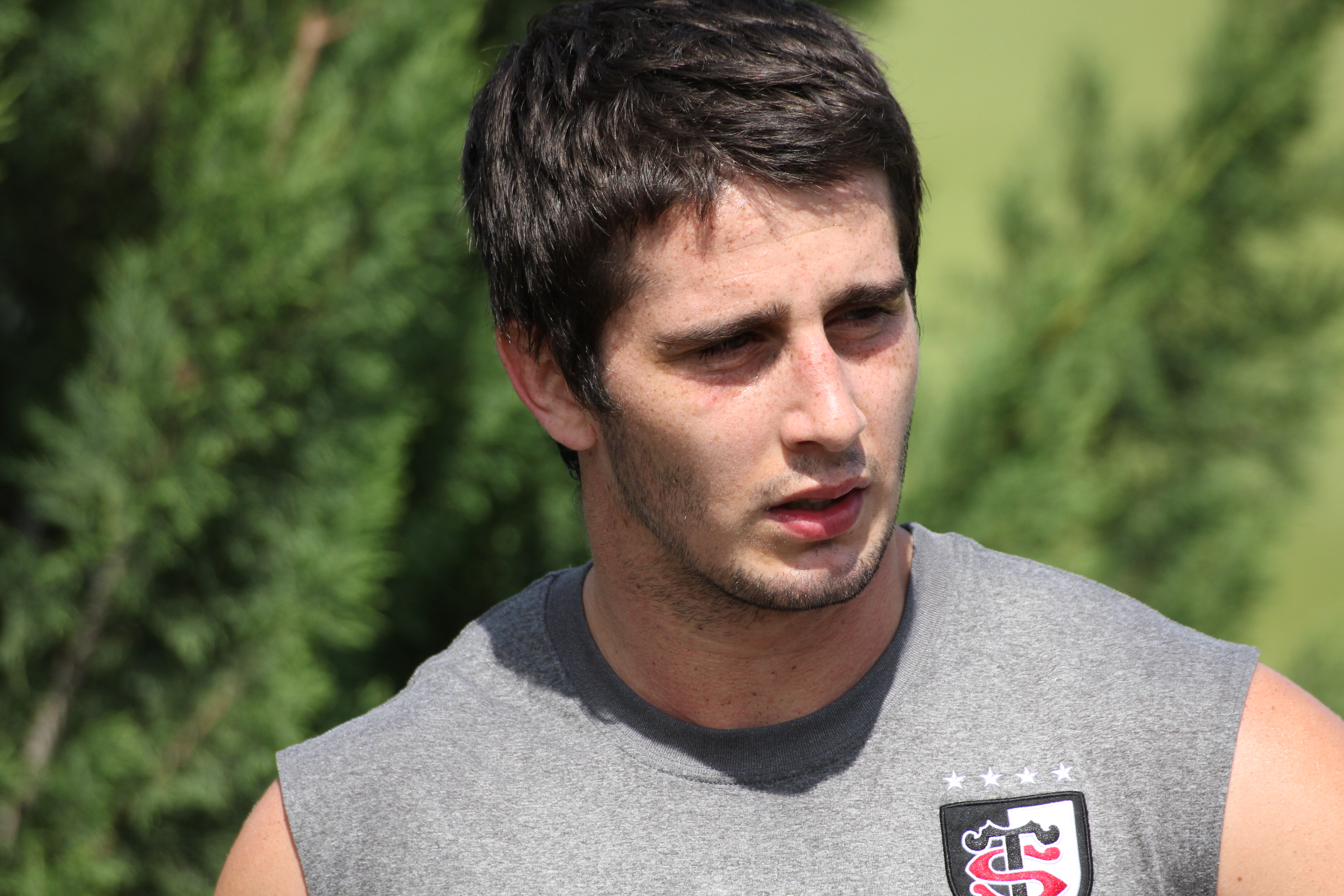
- Born: Nicolas Bezy; 26 September 1989 (age 37) Fontenay-aux-Roses, France
- Height: 5 ft 11 in (1.80 m)

Rugby union career
- Position(s): Scrum-half, Fly-half
Senior career
Years	Team	Apps	(Points)
2007–2012	Toulouse	42	(131)
2012–2013	Stade Français	16	(31)
2013–2014	Grenoble	12	(21)
2014–2018	Brive	65	(63)
2018–2022	Provence	82	(129)

Nicolas Bézy (born 26 September 1989) is a former French rugby union footballer. He played at scrum-half and fly-half. Nicolas Bézy was a member of the Stade Toulousain team that won the 2010-11 Top 14. He is the older brother of fellow half-back Sébastien Bézy, who currently plays for ASM Clermont Auvergne in the Top 14.
