= 2009–10 Rugby Pro D2 season =

- Countries: France
- Champions: Agen
- Promoted: Agen; La Rochelle
- Relegated: Lannemezan
- Matches played: 243
- Attendance: 1,063,059 (average 4,375 per match)
- Tries scored: 715 (average 2.9 per match)
- Top point scorer: (Ivory Coast) Silvère Tian (259)
- Top try scorer: (Fiji) Rupeni Caucaunibuca (13)

The 2009–10 Rugby Pro D2 was the second-level French rugby union club competition, behind the Top 14, for the 2009–10 season. It ran alongside the 2009–10 Top 14 competition; both competitions were operated by the Ligue Nationale de Rugby (LNR).

Dax and Mont-de-Marsan, the two major clubs from the Landes département, got relegated at the end of the previous Top 14 season and replaced Racing Métro and Albi, who gained promotion to the Top 14. This season also welcomed Lannemezan and Aix-en-Provence, respectively Fédérale 1 champions and runners-up, who took the place of Bourg-en-Bresse and Béziers, the previous year's two bottom finishers.

Agen, who had been a favorite for promotion ever since they were relegated at the end of the 2006–07 season, finally lived up to the expectations and dominated the championship from the start, finishing with an 11-point margin over second-placed Lyon and thus earning promotion to the 2010–11 Top 14 season. Lyon and La Rochelle made the most of the home ground advantage to qualify for the promotion final with victories over Pau and Oyonnax, respectively, and faced each other in the final. La Rochelle, despite having lost both confrontations against Lyon during the regular season, triumphed 32–26 and earned the right to accompany Agen in the Top 14 after eight years spent in Pro D2.

The two newly promoted teams, Aix-en-Provence and Lannemezan, were not able to rival the other teams and from early on in the season occupied the bottom two places that they kept until the end. Lannemezan in particular finished with three wins out of thirty games (one of which was against arch-rivals Tarbes), amounting to 19 points, the poorest record in the Pro D2 since the introduction of the bonus points.

However, in a new twist of events, Montauban, who were already relegated to Pro D2 for financial reasons (thus saving Bayonne's spot in the Top 14), failed their audit on June 10, and were further relegated to Fédérale 1. Their decision not to appeal the DNACG's ruling also meant that Aix would be reprieved and compete again in Pro D2 for the next year.

== Previous season ==
Location of teams in Rugby Pro D2 2009–10

At the end of the previous season, Racing Métro were champions and thus automatically promoted to Top 14. They were eventually followed by Albi, who defeated Oyonnax in the final of the promotion playoffs to secure a spot in the 2009–10 Top 14. Bourg-en-Bresse, which had been newly promoted to Pro D2 for the 2008–09 season, finished second-to-bottom of the table and were initially relegated to Fédérale 1, but were further relegated by French sporting authorities to Fédérale 2 due to financial problems. Béziers finished bottom of the league; they would have however stayed in Pro D2 for the next season, had Tarbes not successfully appealed the decision of the DNACG (Direction nationale d'aide et de contrôle de gestion), the LNR's financial arm, to relegate them to Fédérale 1. The other promoted team in 2008–09, Colomiers, stayed up, finishing in 14th, the first safe spot.

Lannemezan and Aix-en-Provence earned promotion from Fédérale 1 for the 2009–10 season, while Dax and Mont-de-Marsan were relegated from the 2008–09 Top 14.

== Competition format ==
The top team at the end of the regular season (after all the teams played one another twice, once at home, once away), is declared champion and earns a spot in the next Top 14 season. Teams ranked second to fifth compete in promotion playoffs, with the semifinals being played at the home ground of the higher-ranked team. The final is then played on neutral ground, and the winner earned the second ticket to the next Top 14.

The LNR uses a slightly different bonus points system from that used in most other rugby competitions. It trialled a new system in 2007–08 explicitly designed to prevent a losing team from earning more than one bonus point in a match, a system that also made it impossible for either team to earn a bonus point in a drawn match. LNR chose to continue with this system for subsequent seasons.

France's bonus point system operates as follows:

- 4 points for a win.
- 2 points for a draw.
- 1 "bonus" point for winning while scoring at least 3 more tries than the opponent. This replaces the standard bonus point for scoring 4 tries regardless of the match result.
- 1 "bonus" point for losing by 7 points (or less).

== Season table ==
Key to colors
Champions automatically promoted to Top 14
Winner of playoffs between second- through fifth-place teams for the second promotion place
Remaining participants in promotion playoffs
Bottom two teams are relegated to Fédérale 1 (Aix were reprieved when Top 14's Montauban were relegated directly to Fédérale 1)

2009–10 Rugby Pro D2 Table
	Club	Played	Won	Drawn	Lost	Points for	Points against	Diff	Bonus points	Points	Head-to-head
1	Agen	30	21	2	7	724	378	+346	17	105	
2	Lyon	30	18	6	6	644	431	+213	10	94	Lyon 8–2
3	La Rochelle	30	19	2	9	607	396	+211	14	94	Lyon 8–2
4	Oyonnax	30	20	0	10	579	452	+127	9	89	
5	Pau	30	16	5	9	545	425	+120	10	84	Pau 5–4
6	Grenoble	30	16	5	9	547	438	+109	10	84	Pau 5–4
7	Aurillac	30	17	0	13	575	518	+57	8	76	
8	Narbonne	30	16	0	14	581	585	−4	9	73	
9	Bordeaux-Bègles	30	15	1	14	507	501	+6	10	72	
10	Tarbes	30	14	0	16	576	574	+2	14	70	
11	Dax	30	13	2	15	542	594	−52	8	64	
12	Mont-de-Marsan	30	14	2	14	528	554	−26	9	64^{1}	
13	Auch	30	9	1	20	472	635	−63	14	52	
14	Colomiers	30	7	4	19	438	623	−185	9	45	
15	Aix-en-Provence	30	6	2	22	426	737	−311	7	35	
16	Lannemezan	30	3	0	27	347	897	−550	7	19	

- ^{^1}: Mont-de-Marsan were docked five points by the DNACG due to their failure to act upon their financial difficulties. This penalty also causes them to finish behind Dax in the table despite a better head-to-head record (5–4).

== Results ==
=== Key ===
The score of the game is given by the middle (third and fourth) columns. The first and last column indicate the number of tries scored by the home and the away team, respectively. A blue border indicates that the team has earned an attacking bonus point (i.e. has scored at least three more tries than its opponent), a yellow one that the team has earned a defensive bonus point (defeat by 7 points or less). If a team earns both bonus points, this will be indicated by a green border.

Round 1

Saturday 29 and Sunday 30 August

5	Grenoble	39	10	Lannemezan	1
1	Lyon	17	13	Bordeaux-Bègles	1
3	Narbonne	28	12	Pau	0
3	Auch	31	22	Colomiers	1
1	Aurillac	25	16	Oyonnax	1
1	Mont-de-marsan	22	21	La Rochelle	0
1	Tarbes	22	15	Aix-en-Provence	0
1	Dax	16	13	Agen	1

Round 2

Saturday 5 and Sunday 6 September

0	Mont-de-marsan	9	12	Grenoble	0
2	Bordeaux-Bègles	23	21	Auch	2
0	Aurillac	12	16	Pau	1
2	Colomiers	19	13	Dax	1
3	Agen	26	21	La Rochelle	2
3	Oyonnax	28	12	Tarbes	0
3	Lyon	36	14	Aix-en-Provence	1
1	Lannemezan	13	16	Narbonne	2

Round 3

Saturday 12 and Sunday 13 September

3	Auch	28	3	Lannemezan	0
3	Narbonne	33	12	Bordeaux-Bègles	0
0	Pau	9	13	Lyon	2
1	Grenoble	22	12	Colomiers	0
3	Tarbes	36	12	Mont-de-marsan	0
1	Aix-en-Provence	16	22	La Rochelle	1
3	Dax	27	6	Oyonnax	0
3	Agen	21	6	Aurillac	0

Round 4

Friday 18, Saturday 19 and Sunday 20 September

1	Grenoble	16	15	Pau	0
1	Bordeaux-Bègles	22	9	Aurillac	0
0	Colomiers	12	12	Lyon	0
1	Oyonnax	13	6	Narbonne	0
0	Mont-de-marsan	24	18	Aix-en-Provence	0
1	La Rochelle	16	6	Tarbes	0
2	Lannemezan	11	23	Dax	3
0	Auch	3	19	Agen	1

Round 5

Saturday 26 and Sunday 27 September

1	La Rochelle	22	6	Lannemezan	0
0	Tarbes	15	12	Bordeaux-Bègles	0
1	Pau	16	14	Dax	1
1	Aurillac	22	12	Colomiers	0
0	Lyon	18	22	Oyonnax	1
0	Mont-de-marsan	6	16	Auch	1
0	Aix-en-Provence	24	19	Narbonne	1
1	Agen	22	16	Grenoble	1

Round 6

Saturday 10 and Sunday 11 October

0	Narbonne	15	12	Mont-de-marsan	0
0	Pau	6	6	La Rochelle	0
1	Colomiers	13	13	Aix-en-Provence	1
1	Auch	14	19	Tarbes	1
0	Dax	9	9	Lyon	0
0	Grenoble	12	6	Aurillac	0
0	Bordeaux-Bègles	15	29	Agen	3
3	Lannemezan	24	35	Oyonnax	4

Round 7

Friday 16, Saturday 17 and Sunday 18 October

3	Lyon	26	6	Auch	0
0	Aix-en-Provence	12	8	Lannemezan	1
1	Mont-de-marsan	16	12	Bordeaux-Bègles	0
1	Tarbes	22	23	Pau	1
1	Aurillac	23	6	Dax	0
0	Oyonnax	12	10	Agen	1
3	Colomiers	19	13	La Rochelle	1
4	Narbonne	32	0	Grenoble	0

Round 8

Saturday 24 and Sunday 25 October

3	Bordeaux-Bègles	21	10	Aix-en-Provence	1
2	Agen	20	14	Pau	1
3	Oyonnax	31	15	Colomiers	2
1	Tarbes	28	18	Grenoble	2
3	Dax	22	14	Auch	1
2	Aurillac	15	3	Narbonne	0
0	La Rochelle	18	19	Lyon	1
1	Lannemezan	16	18	Mont-de-marsan	2

Round 9

31 October and 1 November
Lyon – Tarbes was postponed to 15 November after
an H1N1 flu outbreak amongst Tarbes players Saturday 31 October, Sunday 1 and Sunday 15 November

2	Colomiers	17	13	Lannemezan	1
2	Pau	17	11	Bordeaux-Bègles	1
0	Aix-en-Provence	3	16	Oyonnax	1
5	Agen	37	8	Mont-de-marsan	1
0	Grenoble	9	9	La Rochelle	0
3	Auch	34	23	Aurillac	1
0	Dax	3	17	Narbonne	2
5	Lyon	43	14	Tarbes	1

Round 10

Saturday 7 and Sunday 8 November

1	Oyonnax	16	9	Pau	0
0	Mont-de-marsan	15	15	Lyon	0
3	Aurillac	38	19	Aix-en-Provence	1
3	La Rochelle	29	10	Dax	1
0	Auch	15	17	Grenoble	1
1	Lannemezan	11	41	Agen	5
3	Bordeaux-Bègles	31	9	Colomiers	0
4	Narbonne	27	20	Tarbes	3

Round 11

Saturday 21 and Sunday 22 November

3	Pau	25	12	Lannemezan	0
1	Aix-en-Provence	13	15	Grenoble	2
3	La Rochelle	20	6	Auch	0
3	Lyon	20	8	Narbonne	1
1	Bordeaux-Bègles	17	10	Oyonnax	1
1	Colomiers	16	21	Agen	2
1	Mont-de-marsan	16	5	Dax	1
1	Tarbes	11	13	Aurillac	1

Round 12

Saturday 28, Sunday 29 November and Wednesday 23 December

5	Agen	29	3	Aix-en-Provence	0
1	Aurillac	25	22	La Rochelle	3
1	Dax	19	16	Tarbes	1
0	Grenoble	9	9	Lyon	0
0	Auch	27	32	Narbonne	2
0	Lannemezan	9	16	Bordeaux-Bègles	1
5	Oyonnax	36	10	Mont-de-marsan	1
4	Pau	38	5	Colomiers	1

Round 13

Friday 4, Saturday 5 and Sunday 6 December

1	Lyon	22	10	Aurillac	1
0	Tarbes	12	13	Lannemezan	1
4	La Rochelle	27	13	Bordeaux-Bègles	1
2	Aix-en-Provence	21	16	Pau	1
1	Colomiers	10	15	Mont-de-marsan	2
1	Oyonnax	25	18	Auch	2
0	Dax	15	8	Grenoble	1
1	Narbonne	22	16	Agen	2

Round 14

Saturday 12 and Sunday 13 December

0	Mont-de-marsan	18	14	Pau	1
1	Tarbes	28	21	Colomiers	0
0	Lyon	9	10	Agen	1
4	Auch	35	14	Aix-en-Provence	1
1	Narbonne	16	13	La Rochelle	1
0	Lannemezan	9	16	Aurillac	1
2	Bordeaux-Bègles	17	16	Dax	1
2	Grenoble	21	13	Oyonnax	1

Round 15

18, 19 and 20 December
Aurillac – Mont-de-Marsan was postponed to 14 February
due to poor climatic conditions in Aurillac
Lannemezan – Lyon was postponed to 24 April due to
heavy snowfalls in the Hautes-Pyrénées département Friday 18, Saturday 19, Sunday 20 December, Sunday 14 February and Sunday 24 April

0	Pau	3	3	Auch	0
1	Bordeaux-Bègles	14	14	Grenoble	1
4	Colomiers	35	13	Narbonne	1
4	Agen	32	14	Tarbes	1
0	Aix-en-Provence	6	15	Dax	2
3	La Rochelle	21	26	Oyonnax	2
5	Aurillac	36	12	Mont-de-marsan	0
1	Lannemezan	17	30	Lyon	2

Round 16

9 and 10 January
Aix-en-Provence – Tarbes was postponed to 13 February
due to poor climatic conditions in Aix
Colomiers – Auch and Agen – Dax were postponed to
14 February due to a frozen pitch and heavy snowfalls,
respectively Saturday 9, Sunday 10 January, Saturday 13 and Sunday 14 February

5	Pau	46	7	Narbonne	1
2	Oyonnax	13	10	Aurillac	1
3	La Rochelle	25	20	Mont-de-marsan	2
1	Lannemezan	10	43	Grenoble	6
3	Bordeaux-Bègles	27	9	Lyon	0
1	Aix-en-Provence	19	21	Tarbes	3
0	Colomiers	6	9	Auch	0
2	Agen	23	6	Dax	0

Round 17

Saturday 16 and Sunday 17 January

8	Narbonne	56	10	Lannemezan	1
1	Auch	17	6	Bordeaux-Bègles	0
2	Pau	21	14	Aurillac	1
1	Dax	10	0	Colomiers	0
1	Tarbes	13	9	Oyonnax	0
0	Aix-en-Provence	12	12	Lyon	0
1	La Rochelle	20	10	Agen	1
1	Grenoble	14	9	Mont-de-marsan	0

Round 18

Saturday 23 and Sunday 24 January

2	Bordeaux-Bègles	21	12	Narbonne	0
1	Colomiers	10	10	Grenoble	1
2	Oyonnax	29	10	Dax	1
0	Mont-de-marsan	18	12	Tarbes	0
4	La Rochelle	37	3	Aix-en-Provence	0
1	Aurillac	19	17	Agen	2
1	Lannemezan	10	17	Auch	1
1	Lyon	22	22	Pau	1

Round 19

Saturday 30 and Sunday 31 January

4	Dax	34	8	Lannemezan	1
0	Aurillac	12	7	Bordeaux-Bègles	1
0	Narbonne	6	13	Oyonnax	1
2	Agen	21	6	Auch	0
2	Aix-en-Provence	20	18	Mont-de-marsan	2
1	Tarbes	7	12	La Rochelle	0
2	Pau	26	3	Grenoble	0
7	Lyon	50	10	Colomiers	1

Round 20

Saturday 6 and Sunday 7 February

0	Grenoble	12	12	Agen	0
1	Bordeaux-Bègles	16	9	Tarbes	0
0	Dax	3	3	Pau	0
1	Colomiers	13	9	Aurillac	0
0	Auch	3	19	Mont-de-marsan	1
7	Narbonne	43	10	Aix-en-Provence	1
3	Oyonnax	21	6	Lyon	0
1	Lannemezan	5	31	La Rochelle	3

Round 21

Saturday 20 and Sunday 21 February

1	Mont-de-marsan	17	6	Narbonne	0
2	Agen	21	16	Bordeaux-Bègles	1
4	Oyonnax	29	0	Lannemezan	0
0	Aix-en-Provence	12	25	Colomiers	1
1	Tarbes	19	13	Auch	1
2	Lyon	26	6	Dax	0
0	Aurillac	24	21	Grenoble	2
4	La Rochelle	32	0	Pau	0

Round 22

Saturday 27 and Sunday 28 February

2	Bordeaux-Bègles	24	21	Mont-de-marsan	2
1	Pau	16	15	Tarbes	0
1	La Rochelle	11	6	Colomiers	0
1	Dax	22	13	Aurillac	1
2	Auch	18	25	Lyon	1
2	Grenoble	27	14	Narbonne	2
3	Lannemezan	32	28	Aix-en-Provence	3
2	Agen	23	11	Oyonnax	1

Round 23

Saturday 6 and Sunday 7 March

2	Lyon	20	14	La Rochelle	1
6	Mont-de-marsan	46	6	Lannemezan	0
1	Aix-en-Provence	13	10	Bordeaux-Bègles	1
1	Grenoble	22	20	Tarbes	1
2	Auch	15	21	Dax	0
1	Narbonne	25	9	Aurillac	0
1	Pau	16	16	Agen	1
0	Colomiers	12	13	Oyonnax	1

Round 24

Saturday 13 and Sunday 14 March

3	Lannemezan	24	22	Colomiers	1
4	Bordeaux-Bègles	31	13	Pau	2
5	Oyonnax	36	18	Aix-en-Provence	2
3	Tarbes	22	16	Lyon	1
3	Narbonne	24	18	Dax	2
2	Aurillac	24	15	Auch	0
2	La Rochelle	25	21	Grenoble	2
2	Mont-de-marsan	18	12	Agen	0

Round 25

Saturday 27 and Sunday 28 March

3	Lyon	26	6	Mont-de-marsan	0
6	Agen	43	3	Lannemezan	0
1	Colomiers	20	22	Bordeaux-Bègles	1
0	Aix-en-Provence	18	23	Aurillac	2
2	Tarbes	23	11	Narbonne	1
1	Dax	13	17	La Rochelle	1
1	Grenoble	19	0	Auch	0
1	Pau	17	6	Oyonnax	0

Round 26

Saturday 3 and Sunday 4 April

1	Oyonnax	16	6	Bordeaux-Bègles	0
3	Agen	31	3	Colomiers	0
1	Dax	19	15	Mont-de-marsan	0
4	Grenoble	28	5	Aix-en-Provence	1
3	Aurillac	36	18	Tarbes	2
0	Auch	3	9	La Rochelle	0
0	Lannemezan	15	21	Pau	2
0	Narbonne	3	27	Lyon	4

Round 27

Saturday 10 and Sunday 11 April

1	Aix-en-Provence	10	31	Agen	4
6	Bordeaux-Bègles	46	17	Lannemezan	2
0	Colomiers	12	29	Pau	2
2	La Rochelle	21	22	Aurillac	1
6	Tarbes	40	21	Dax	3
3	Narbonne	20	19	Auch	3
2	Mont-de-marsan	31	26	Oyonnax	2
2	Lyon	27	19	Grenoble	2

Round 28

Saturday 17 and Sunday 18 April

1	Lannemezan	16	39	Tarbes	5
1	Bordeaux-Bègles	14	28	La Rochelle	4
6	Pau	45	10	Aix-en-Provence	1
2	Mont-de-marsan	29	29	Colomiers	3
5	Auch	36	20	Oyonnax	2
4	Grenoble	28	5	Dax	1
0	Aurillac	18	25	Lyon	3
8	Agen	57	12	Narbonne	2

Round 29

Saturday 1 and Sunday 2 May

6	Aurillac	45	3	Lannemezan	0
1	Dax	8	9	Bordeaux-Bègles	0
0	Pau	18	6	Mont-de-marsan	0
2	Aix-en-Provence	23	14	Auch	2
4	La Rochelle	36	21	Narbonne	2
4	Agen	34	11	Lyon	1
1	Colomiers	16	14	Tarbes	1
2	Oyonnax	26	19	Grenoble	1

Round 30

Sunday 9 May

6	Lyon	44	13	Lannemezan	1
5	Grenoble	33	3	Bordeaux-Bègles	0
2	Auch	16	19	Pau	1
5	Narbonne	34	17	Colomiers	2
0	Oyonnax	6	9	La Rochelle	0
2	Tarbes	29	27	Agen	4
5	Mont-de-marsan	42	15	Aurillac	2
5	Dax	33	24	Aix-en-Provence	4

== Promotion playoffs ==
All times CEST.

=== Semi-finals ===
15 May 2010
19:00

La Rochelle	6 – 3	Oyonnax
Pen: Dambielle (2/4) 47', 67'	Report	Drop: Guilloux (1/2) 37'

Stade Marcel-Deflandre, La Rochelle
Attendance: 12,000
Referee: Franck Maciello

16 May 2010
15:00

Lyon	29 – 13	Pau
Try: Sadourny 29' m Nicoud 33' c Sève 63' m Con: Montagnat (1/3); Pen: Montagnat (4/5) 3', 6', 12', 16'	Report	Try: Puyo 51' c Con: Hough (1/1); Pen: Darbo (2/3) 8', 57'

Stade Vuillermet, Lyon
Attendance: 4,190
Referee: Mathieu Raynal

=== Final ===
23 May 2010
16:30

Lyon	26 – 32	La Rochelle
Try: Bailey (2) 3' c, 25' m Leite 20' m Con: Montagnat (1/3); Pen: Montagnat (3/4) 14', 55', 63'	Report	Try: Ferrou 52' c Ninard 69' c Con: Dambielle (2/2); Pen: Dambielle (6/7) 7', 12', 23', 31', 35', 59'

Stade Amédée-Domenech, Brive
Attendance: 15,000
Referee: Patrick Péchambert

== See also ==
- 2009–10 Top 14 season
