= Jonathan Wisniewski =

French rugby union player

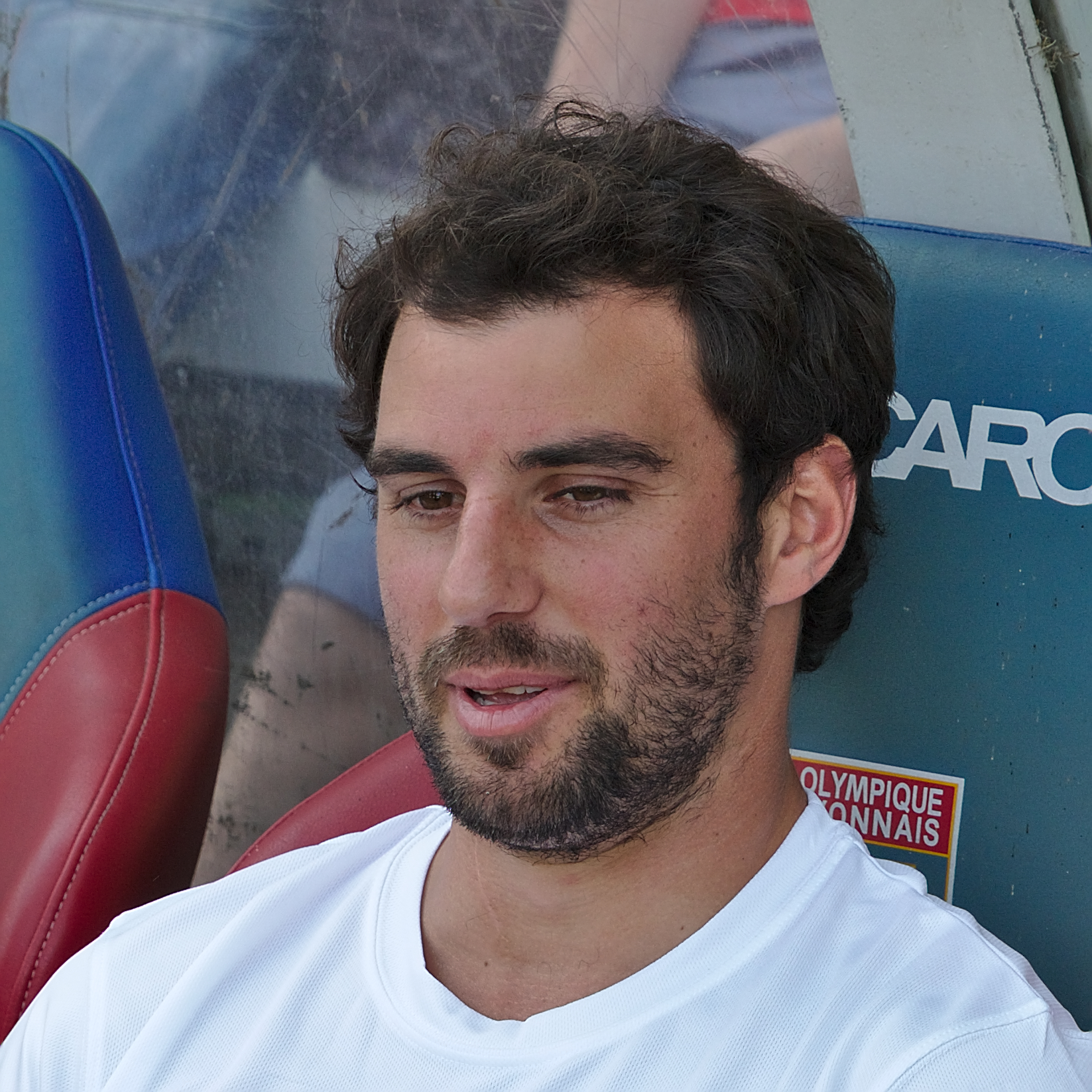
- Born: July 16, 1985 (age 41) Albi, France
- Height: 1.80 m (5 ft 11 in)
- Weight: 77 kg (12 st 2 lb)

Rugby union career
- Position: Fly-half
Amateur team(s)
Years	Team	Apps	(Points)
1993–2000	Gaillac		
2000–2001	Castres		
2001–2005	Toulouse		
- Correct as of May 8, 2011
Senior career
Years	Team	Apps	(Points)
2004–2005	Toulouse	1	(0)
2005–2006	Aix	17	(99)
2006–2007	Castres	5	(9)
2007	Colomiers	17	(236)
2007–2014	Racing Métro	146	(1,653)
2014–2017	Grenoble	67	(869)
2017–2018	Toulon	7	(31)
2018–2021	Lyon	57	(565)

Jonathan Wisniewski (born 16 July 1985) is a former French rugby union player who played as a fly-half. He is of Polish descent and is a grandnephew of Maryan Wisniewski.

== Club career ==
Wisniewski started playing rugby at a youth level for Gaillac. In 2000, he left for Castres, but only stayed for one year, joining the Toulouse youth academy in 2001 at age 16. He stayed there for four years, even making one appearance for the senior team during the 2004–05 season. He signed his first professional contract for Aix-en-Provence, who were relegated from Pro D2 to Fédérale 1 at the end of the season, forcing Wisniewski to leave. He signed for Castres, but the arrival of New-Zealander Cameron McIntyre moved him to third-choice fly-half, and he was asked to leave during the winter break by his president. Wisniewski joined Colomiers in January, when the club was already doomed to relegation, but the six months spent there turned out to be a very positive personal experience for him, and his form caught the eye of ambitious Racing Métro manager Pierre Berbizier, who signed him the following summer. He overtook All-Black legend Andrew Mehrtens as first-choice fly-half in his first season for the club, and has remained first choice since, despite the arrival of such big names as François Steyn and Juan Martín Hernández. He was an integral part of Racing's first Heineken Cup campaign, that ended in the group stage, behind Leinster and Clermont, but in front of Saracens.

== International career ==
Wisniewski has been capped twice with the French under-21 national team (Italy in 2005 and Wales in 2006), and has also played with the France A team during the 2010 Churchill Cup. In 2009, he turned down Nick Mallett's offer to play for the Italian national team. He was subsequently called up by Marc Lièvremont as a replacement for the injured François Trinh-Duc for the French national team in the 2010 autumn internationals. He injured himself a few days later as well and was himself replaced by David Skrela. He did not feature in the 30-man squad announced by Lièvremont for the 2011 Six Nations Championship.

== Honours ==
- Racing Métro 92
  - Pro D2 (2009)
