= Pierre-Yves Montagnat =

- Born: 5 March 1986 (age 40) France
- Height: 1.73 m (5 ft 8 in)
- Weight: 76 kg (12 st 0 lb)

Rugby union career
- Position(s): Fullback, winger
Senior career
Years	Team	Apps	(Points)
2007–2009	Oyonnax	48	(406)
2009–2011	Lyon OU	25	(228)
2011–2013	FC Grenoble		
- Correct as of April 25, 2010

Pierre-Yves Montagnat (born March 5, 1986) is a professional rugby union fullback or winger currently playing for Lyon OU in the Pro D2, for whom he signed on June 5, 2009 after two years spent at Oyonnax.

After leaving Bourgoin's youth system, where he won the 2007 Coupe Frantz Reichel (the French under-21 championship), Montagnat joined the nearby Pro D2 club Oyonnax. During his second season there, he finished as the top point scorer in the 2008–09 Rugby Pro D2 season with 336 points.
