= CA Saint-Étienne Loire Sud Rugby =

French rugby union club

(France) CA Saint-Étienne
- Full name: Club de rugby de SAINT-ETIENNE, RCSE42
- Founded: 1908
- Location: Saint-Étienne, France
- Ground(s): Stade Etivallière (Capacity: 3,000)
- President: (France) Frédéric Baudouin
- Coach(es): (France) Jean-Sébastien Bignat (France) Cédric Chaubeau
- League(s): Fédérale 1
- 2010–11: 16th (Pro D2) (relegated)
Team kit

Official website
- www.caserugby.com

Club Athlétique de Saint-Étienne Loire Sud Rugby, CASE Loire Sud Rugby, or simply CASE, is a French rugby union club from Saint-Étienne in the Loire département. As of 2011, they were competing in Fédérale 1, having been relegated from Rugby Pro D2 at the end of the 2010–11 season.

== History ==
The club was founded in 1908 under the name Stade Forézien Universitaire. They went through a difficult time in the 1960s, and had to merge with the CASE omnisport structure in 1975 at the request of the municipality. It did not help turn back the tide, however, and poor results and fewer and fewer licensed players forced the club to withdraw its senior team from all competitions in 1991. The next year, the club was restarted in 4ème Série, the lowest French rugby division, and was able to climb the ladder, gaining promotion to Fédérale 3 in 2004, one year after merging with the neighbouring club SEMUR and adopting its current name. In 2007, Saint-Etienne were promoted to Fédérale 2. A mere two years later, they finished 13th overall in the championship, with the top 12 clubs being promoted to Fédérale 1. However, Lombez-Samatan declined their promotion, sending Saint-Étienne to the top amateur division for the first time.

For their first season in Fédérale 1, Saint-Étienne signed the coach Jean-Sébastien Bignat from Arras, and the international fullback Alexandre Péclier from Lyon. They had an impressive start with two away wins in their first two games, and on November 7, they took on Béziers in Andrézieux-Bouthéon's Stade Roger-Baudras. The 3,000 people in the stadium were not the only ones to witness the locals' 15–9 victory though, as the match was broadcast live on Eurosport, a first for a Fédérale 1 game. This run of good form allowed them to clinch the fourth place in their group and thus to qualify for the Trophée Jean Prat. In the second phase, they finished second behind Tyrosse and qualified for the Round of 16 where they faced Nice. They prevailed 19–18 thanks to a last-second drop-goal by Péclier and faced Chalon-sur-Saône, one of the favorites for promotion, in the quarters. Saint-Étienne stunned them by winning both legs (12–3 at home, 24–20 away), inflicting them their only home defeat of the season in the process. In the semis, they took on Bourg-en-Bresse. The popular support for the team was such that the municipality allowed the first leg to be played in Stade Geoffroy-Guichard. Over 16,000 people came to see the locals take the slenderest of leads into the second leg with a 23–22 victory. Another shock 19–16 win in Bourg-en-Bresse sent Saint-Étienne in the Jean Prat Trophy final, but much more importantly gave them a ticket to professional rugby and the Pro D2, after only one year spent in Fédérale 1, and perhaps more impressively only three years after leaving Fédérale 3. They fell in the final to Carcassonne 16–3.

== Notable players ==
- Philippe Gimbert
- Alexandre Péclier
- Inoke Afeaki
- Mihai Lazăr
