= 2008–09 Rugby Pro D2 season =

- Countries: France
- Champions: Racing Métro
- Promoted: Racing Métro; Albi
- Relegated: Bourg-en-Bresse; Béziers
- Matches played: 243
- Attendance: 1,139,050 (average 4,687 per match)
- Tries scored: 703 (average 2.9 per match)
- Top point scorer: (France) Pierre-Yves Montagnat (336)
- Top try scorer: (France) Yoann Huguet (14)

The 2008–09 Rugby Pro D2 was the second-level French rugby union club competition, behind the Top 14, in the 2008–09 season. It ran alongside the 2008–09 Top 14 competition; both competitions were operated by the Ligue Nationale de Rugby (LNR).

== Previous season ==
At the end of the previous season, Toulon were champions and thus automatically promoted to Top 14. They were eventually followed by Mont-de-Marsan, who beat Racing Métro in extra time in the final providing the second promotion place. Blagnac, which had been newly promoted to Pro D2 for the 2007–08 season, finished bottom of the table and were initially relegated to Fédérale 1, but were further relegated by French sporting authorities to Fédérale 2 due to financial problems. Limoges finished second-from-bottom for the second consecutive year; unlike 2006–07, when Limoges were reprieved when Gaillac were denied a professional license due to financial issues, they received no such break in 2007–08. The other promoted team in 2007–08, Aurillac, stayed up, finishing in 11th.

Colomiers and Bourg-en-Bresse earned promotion from Fédérale 1 for the 2008–09 season, while Albi and Auch were relegated from the 2007–08 Top 14.

== 2008–09 synopsis ==
Racing Métro, which had barely missed out on promotion the previous season, easily won the title, clinching with three rounds to spare. The three promotion playoff games were decided by a total of 5 points, with the semifinal between Albi and La Rochelle being tied after extra time and decided on the third step of the tiebreaker, penalties scored during the match. Albi ultimately defeated Oyonnax in the final to secure an immediate return to the Top 14.

The two newly promoted teams, Colomiers and Bourg-en-Bresse, were in relegation trouble throughout the season, but Colomiers escaped, finishing in 14th, the last safe spot. Bourg-en-Bresse were provisionally joined in relegation by Béziers.

However, this did not end the relegation saga. In order to keep a professional license and stay in Pro D2, all clubs must pass a postseason audit conducted by DNACG (Direction nationale d'aide et de contrôle de gestion), the LNR's financial arm. On June 12, DNACG announced that Tarbes and Bourg-en-Bresse had failed their audits and would be relegated. Tarbes would be relegated to Fédérale 1, while Bourg-en-Bresse, already consigned to Fédérale 1, would face a further drop to Fédérale 2. Béziers would have been spared the drop if Tarbes had not successfully appealed its relegation. However, Tarbes were able to come up with sufficient financial guarantees to satisfy DNACG, and its relegation to Fédérale 1 was officially rescinded on June 26.

== The competition ==
The LNR uses a slightly different bonus points system from that used in most other rugby competitions. It trialled a new system in 2007–08 explicitly designed to prevent a losing team from earning more than one bonus point in a match, a system that also makes it impossible for either team to earn a bonus point in a drawn match. LNR chose to continue with this system for 2008–09.

France's bonus point system operates as follows:

- 4 points for a win.
- 2 points for a draw.
- 1 "bonus" point for winning while scoring at least 3 more tries than the opponent. This replaces the standard bonus point for scoring 4 tries regardless of the match result.
- 1 "bonus" point for losing by 7 points (or less).

== Season table ==
Key to colors
Champions automatically promoted to Top 14
Winner of playoffs between second- through fifth-place teams for the second promotion place
Remaining participants in promotion playoffs
Bottom two teams are relegated to Fédérale 1.

2008–09 Rugby Pro D2 Table
	Club	Total points	Bonus points	Match points	Games	Won	Drawn	Lost	Points for	Points against	Diff
1	Racing Métro	107	11	96	30	24	0	6	754	469	+285
2	Agen	94	10	84	30	21	0	9	799	543	+256
3	Albi	87	7	80	30	19	2	9	569	493	+76
4	La Rochelle	87	15	72	30	18	0	12	647	499	+148
5	Oyonnax	85	11	74	30	18	1	11	605	438	+167
6	Lyon	84	14	72	30	17	1	12	600	448	+152
7	Tarbes	73	11	62	30	15	1	14	602	534	+68
8	Pau	72	10	62	30	15	1	14	523	507	+16
9	Aurillac	72	6	66	30	16	1	13	615	653	−38
10	Grenoble	60	14	46	30	11	1	18	416	469	−53
11	Bordeaux-Bègles	60	8	52	30	13	0	17	591	639	−48
12	Auch	53	9	44	30	11	0	19	416	533	−117
13	Narbonne	49	7	42	30	9	3	18	494	672	−178
14	Colomiers	47	7	40	30	9	2	19	541	679	−138
15	Bourg-en-Bresse	43	9	34	30	8	1	21	507	813	−306
16	Béziers	41	5	36	30	8	2	20	465	755	−290

== Schedule and results ==
Matches are listed in the following order:

1. By date.
2. If matches are held on the same day, by kickoff time.
3. Otherwise, in alphabetic order of home club.

All times CET.

=== Rounds 1 to 5 ===
Round 1

- 6 September, 18:30 — Aurillac 11 - 6 (1 BP) Albi
- 6 September, 18:30 — Béziers 15 - 15 Pau
- 6 September, 18:30 — Grenoble (1 BP) 31 - 6 Colomiers
- 6 September, 18:30 — La Rochelle 30 - 12 Oyonnax
- 6 September, 18:30 — Lyon 18 - 9 Racing Métro
- 6 September, 18:30 — Narbonne 6 - 6 Tarbes
- 7 September, 15:00 — Bourg-en-Bresse (1 BP) 18 - 25 Bordeaux-Bègles
- 7 September, 15:15 — Agen 30 - 16 Auch

Round 2

- 13 September, 18:30 — Albi 26 - 19 (1 BP) Grenoble
- 13 September, 18:30 — Auch 21 - 16 (1 BP) Narbonne
- 13 September, 18:30 — Bordeaux-Bègles 24 - 12 Béziers
- 13 September, 18:30 — Colomiers 20 - 6 Lyon
- 13 September, 18:30 — Pau 27 - 15 Agen
- 13 September, 18:30 — Tarbes (1 BP) 15 - 16 Aurillac
- 14 September, 15:00 — Racing Métro 12 - 9 (1 BP) La Rochelle
- 14 September, 16:00 — Oyonnax (1 BP) 38 - 8 Bourg-en-Bresse

Round 3

- 20 September, 18:30 — Agen 26 - 19 (1 BP) Oyonnax
- 20 September, 18:30 — Aurillac (1 BP) 49 - 19 Bordeaux-Bègles
- 20 September, 18:30 — La Rochelle 15 - 12 (1 BP) Auch
- 20 September, 18:30 — Lyon (1 BP) 56 - 3 Tarbes
- 20 September, 18:30 — Narbonne 16 - 25 Racing Métro
- 21 September, 15:00 — Bourg-en-Bresse (1 BP) 12 - 18 Albi
- 21 September, 15:00 — Grenoble 22 - 9 Pau
- 21 September, 15:15 — Colomiers (1 BP) 38 - 17 Béziers

Round 4

- 27 September, 18:30 — Albi 28 - 22 (1 BP) Narbonne
- 27 September, 18:30 — Auch 24 - 6 Bourg-en-Bresse
- 27 September, 18:30 — Bordeaux-Bègles (1 BP) 22 - 23 La Rochelle
- 27 September, 18:30 — Oyonnax 22 - 15 (1 BP) Lyon
- 27 September, 18:30 — Pau 30 - 23 (1 BP) Colomiers
- 27 September, 18:30 — Racing Métro (1 BP) 35 - 16 Aurillac
- 27 September, 18:30 — Tarbes 34 - 24 Agen
- 28 September, 15:15 — Béziers 16 - 25 Grenoble

Round 5

- 4 October, 18:30 — Agen (1 BP) 14 - 17 Bordeaux-Bègles
- 4 October, 18:30 — Aurillac 30 - 26 (1 BP) Oyonnax
- 4 October, 18:30 — Béziers 22 - 19 (1 BP) Auch
- 4 October, 18:30 — Colomiers 15 - 15 Narbonne
- 4 October, 18:30 — Grenoble (1 BP)10 - 16 Racing Métro
- 4 October, 18:30 — Lyon (1 BP) 15 - 22 (1 BP) Albi
- 5 October, 15:00 — Bourg-en-Bresse 22 - 16 (1 BP) Tarbes
- 5 October, 15:15 — La Rochelle 18 - 14 (1 BP) Pau

=== Rounds 6 to 10 ===
Round 6

- 18 October, 18:30 — Agen (1 BP) 62 - 9 Bourg-en-Bresse
- 18 October, 18:30 — Albi 29 - 22 (1 BP) La Rochelle
- 18 October, 18:30 — Auch 15 - 9 (1 BP) Grenoble
- 18 October, 18:30 — Narbonne 26 - 17 Bordeaux-Bègles
- 18 October, 18:30 — Oyonnax 16 - 3 Pau
- 18 October, 18:30 — Racing Métro (1 BP) 37 - 9 Béziers
- 18 October, 18:30 — Tarbes 25 - 10 Colomiers
- 19 October, 14:00 — Lyon 19 - 13 (1 BP) Aurillac

Round 7

- 25 October, 18:30 — Béziers 9 - 30 (1 BP) Oyonnax
- 25 October, 18:30 — Grenoble 23 - 19 (1 BP) Tarbes
- 25 October, 18:30 — La Rochelle (1 BP) 23 - 18 (1 BP) Lyon
- 25 October, 18:30 — Narbonne 25 - 22 (1 BP) Agen
- 25 October, 18:30 — Pau 16 - 15 (1 BP) Racing Métro
- 26 October, 15:00 — Bourg-en-Bresse 11 - 20 Aurillac
- 26 October, 15:00 — Colomiers 24 - 15 Auch
- 26 October, 15:15 — Bordeaux-Bègles 19 - 6 Albi

Round 8

- 1 November, 18:30 — Agen 18 - 12 (1 BP) Grenoble
- 1 November, 18:30 — Auch 17 - 12 (1 BP) Pau
- 1 November, 18:30 — Aurillac (1 BP) 31 - 9 Narbonne
- 1 November, 18:30 — La Rochelle (1 BP) 56 - 18 Bourg-en-Bresse
- 1 November, 18:30 — Lyon 12 - 10 (1 BP) Béziers
- 1 November, 18:30 — Oyonnax 16 - 16 Albi
- 1 November, 18:30 — Tarbes 31 - 15 Bordeaux
- 2 November, 16:45 — Racing Métro 9 - 8 (1 BP) Colomiers

Round 9

- 8 November, 18:30 — Albi 30 - 20 Colomiers
- 8 November, 18:30 — Aurillac 25 - 19 (1 BP) La Rochelle
- 8 November, 18:30 — Bordeaux-Bègles (1 BP) 14 - 18 Pau
- 8 November, 18:30 — Grenoble 21 - 20 (1 BP) Lyon
- 8 November, 18:30 — Narbonne 22 - 21 (1 BP) Bourg-en-Bresse
- 8 November, 18:30 — Oyonnax 25 - 9 Auch
- 8 November, 18:30 — Tarbes (1 BP) 16 - 23 Racing Métro
- 9 November, 15:15 — Béziers 21 - 16 (1 BP) Agen

Round 10

- 15 November, 18:30 — Agen 19 - 16 (1 BP) La Rochelle
- 15 November, 18:30 — Albi 18 - 12 (1 BP) Tarbes
- 15 November, 18:30 — Auch 15 - 5 Bordeaux-Bègles
- 15 November, 18:30 — Colomiers 15 - 30 (1 BP) Aurillac
- 15 November, 18:30 — Pau 21 - 16 (1 BP) Lyon
- 15 November, 18:30 — Racing Métro 31 - 20 Oyonnax
- 16 November, 15:00 — Bourg-en-Bresse 9 - 3 (1 BP) Béziers
- 16 November, 15:15 — Narbonne 6 - 3 (1 BP) Grenoble

=== Rounds 11 to 15 ===
Round 11

- 29 November, 18:30 — Agen 36 - 17 Colomiers
- 29 November, 18:30 — Aurillac 29 - 22 (1 BP) Grenoble
- 29 November, 18:30 — Bordeaux-Bègles 15 - 9 (1 BP) Oyonnax
- 29 November, 18:30 — La Rochelle (1 BP) 33 - 9 Béziers
- 29 November, 18:30 — Lyon 14 - 13 (1 BP) Narbonne
- 29 November, 18:30 — Pau 22 - 9 Bourg-en-Bresse
- 30 November, 15:15 — Tarbes 26 - 12 Auch
- 30 November, 16:30 — Racing Métro (1 BP) 36 - 17 Albi

Round 12

- 6 December, 18:30 — Albi 16 - 13 (1 BP) Pau
- 6 December, 18:30 — Béziers 25 - 16 Aurillac
- 6 December, 18:30 — Bordeaux-Bègles 33 - 12 Colomiers
- 6 December, 18:30 — Grenoble 12 - 12 Bourg-en-Bresse
- 6 December, 18:30 — Lyon (1 BP) 12 - 13 Agen
- 6 December, 18:30 — Narbonne 33 - 16 La Rochelle
- 6 December, 18:30 — Oyonnax 12 - 6 (1 BP) Tarbes
- 7 December, 15:15 — Auch 22 - 18 (1 BP) Racing Métro

Round 13

- 13 December, 18:30 — Albi 20 - 14 (1 BP) Auch
- 13 December, 18:30 — Aurillac (1 BP) 16 - 20 Agen
- 13 December, 18:30 — Colomiers 24 - 16 (1 BP) Oyonnax
- 13 December, 18:30 — Pau (1 BP) 33 - 3 Narbonne
- 13 December, 18:30 — Racing Métro (1 BP) 22 - 6 Bordeaux-Bègles
- 13 December, 18:30 — Tarbes 23 - 10 Béziers
- 14 December, 14:30 — Grenoble 14 - 6 La Rochelle
- 14 December, 15:00 — Bourg-en-Bresse (1 BP) 18 - 23 Lyon

Round 14

- 20 December, 18:30 — Auch 11 - 9 (1 BP) Aurillac
- 20 December, 18:30 — La Rochelle (1 BP) 32 - 9 Colomiers
- 20 December, 18:30 — Narbonne (1 BP) 34 - 8 Béziers
- 20 December, 18:30 — Oyonnax 9 - 3 (1 BP) Grenoble
- 20 December, 18:30 — Pau 12 - 11 (1 BP) Tarbes
- 21 December, 14:30 — Bourg-en-Bresse (1 BP) 10 - 17 Racing Métro
- 21 December, 15:00 — Bordeaux-Bègles 28 - 37 (1 BP) Lyon
- 21 December, 15:15 — Agen 20 - 8 Albi

Round 15

- 10 January, 18:30 — Béziers 21 - 21 Albi
- 10 January, 18:30 — Colomiers 13 - 3 Bourg-en-Bresse
- 10 January, 18:30 — Grenoble 13 - 12 (1 BP) Bordeaux-Bègles
- 10 January, 18:30 — Tarbes (1 BP) 10 - 12 La Rochelle
- 11 January, 15:00 — Oyonnax (1 BP) 42 - 17 Narbonne
- 11 January, 15:15 — Lyon 9 - 3 (1 BP) Auch
- 14 February, 18:30 — Aurillac 13 - 22 Pau
- 15 February, 14:00 — Racing Métro 32 - 28 (1 BP) Agen

=== Rounds 16 to 20 ===
Round 16

- 17 January, 18:30 — Auch 12 - 20 Agen
- 17 January, 18:30 — Bordeaux-Bègles (1 BP) 45 - 12 Bourg-en-Bresse
- 17 January, 18:30 — Oyonnax 18 - 12 (1 BP) La Rochelle
- 17 January, 18:30 — Pau 27 - 14 Béziers
- 17 January, 18:30 — Tarbes 27 - 8 Narbonne
- 18 January, 14:15 — Albi (1 BP) 28 - 12 Aurillac
- 18 January, 15:00 — Colomiers 12 - 6 (1 BP) Grenoble
- 18 January, 15:00 — Racing Métro (1 BP) 30 - 6 Lyon

Round 17

- 24 January, 18:30 — La Rochelle 22 - 11 Racing Métro
- 24 January, 18:30 — Lyon 9 - 9 Colomiers
- 25 January, 14:30 — Agen 28 - 14 Pau
- 25 January, 15:00 — Aurillac 17 - 37 Tarbes
- 25 January, 15:00 — Béziers 18 - 12 (1 BP) Bordeaux-Bègles
- 25 January, 15:00 — Bourg-en-Bresse (1 BP) 3 - 9 Oyonnax
- 25 January, 15:00 — Grenoble (1 BP) 9 - 13 Albi
- 25 January, 15:30 — Narbonne (1 BP) 6 - 13 Auch

Round 18

- 31 January, 18:30 — Albi (1 BP) 31 - 18 Bourg-en-Bresse
- 31 January, 18:30 — Auch (1 BP) 5 - 6 La Rochelle
- 31 January, 18:30 — Béziers 12 - 6 (1 BP) Colomiers
- 31 January, 18:30 — Pau 9 - 8 (1 BP) Grenoble
- 31 January, 18:30 — Tarbes 19 - 16 (1 BP) Lyon
- 1 February, 14:45 — Oyonnax 19 - 3 Agen
- 1 February, 15:00 — Racing Métro (1 BP) 37 - 10 Narbonne
- 1 February, 15:15 — Bordeaux-Bègles 29 - 18 Aurillac

Round 19

- 7 February, 15:00 — Narbonne 10 - 9 (1 BP) Albi
- 7 February, 16:00 — Grenoble 12 - 8 (1 BP) Béziers
- 7 February, 16:00 — Lyon 9 - 6 (1 BP) Oyonnax
- 8 February, 15:00 — Agen (1 BP) 45 - 23 Tarbes
- 8 February, 15:00 — Bourg-en-Bresse (1 BP) 36 - 0 Auch
- 8 February, 15:00 — Colomiers 18 - 13 (1 BP) Pau
- 8 February, 15:00 — La Rochelle (1 BP) 13 -16 Bordeaux-Bègles
- 8 February, 17:15 — Aurillac 16 - 35 Racing Métro

Round 20

- 21 February, 18:30 — Albi 19 - 13 (1 BP) Lyon
- 21 February, 18:30 — Auch (1 BP) 32 - 8 Béziers
- 21 February, 18:30 — Bordeaux-Bègles 37 - 28 Agen
- 21 February, 18:30 — Narbonne 37 - 24 Colomiers
- 21 February, 18:30 — Oyonnax (1 BP) 34 - 7 Aurillac
- 21 February, 18:30 — Tarbes (1 BP) 59 - 9 Bourg-en-Bresse
- 22 February, 15:00 — Racing Métro 15 - 7 Grenoble
- 22 February, 15:15 — Pau 20 - 19 (1 BP) La Rochelle

=== Rounds 21 to 25 ===
Round 21

- 28 February, 18:30 — Aurillac 18 - 9 Lyon
- 28 February, 18:30 — Béziers 19 - 51 (1 BP) Racing Métro
- 28 February, 18:30 — Bordeaux-Bègles 26 - 22 Narbonne
- 28 February, 18:30 — Colomiers 20 - 16 (1 BP) Tarbes
- 28 February, 18:30 — Grenoble 26 - 3 Auch
- 28 February, 18:30 — Pau 15 - 12 (1 BP) Oyonnax
- 1 March, 15:00 — Bourg-en-Bresse 18 - 65 (1 BP) Agen
- 1 March, 15:15 — La Rochelle 19 - 16 (1 BP) Albi

Round 22

- 7 March, 18:30 — Agen 20 - 6 Narbonne
- 7 March, 18:30 — Albi 20 - 17 (1 BP) Bordeaux-Bègles
- 7 March, 18:30 — Auch 17 - 12 (1 BP) Colomiers
- 7 March, 18:30 — Aurillac 23 - 17 (1 BP) Bourg-en-Bresse
- 7 March, 18:30 — Lyon 27 - 12 La Rochelle
- 7 March, 18:30 — Racing Métro 28 - 10 Pau
- 7 March, 18:30 — Tarbes 10 - 3 (1 BP) Grenoble
- 8 March, 15:45 — Oyonnax (1 BP) 35 - 6 Béziers

Round 23

- 14 March, 18:30 — Béziers 17 - 56 (1 BP) Lyon
- 14 March, 18:30 — Bordeaux-Bègles 12 - 27 Tarbes
- 14 March, 18:30 — Colomiers 19 - 27 Racing Métro
- 14 March, 18:30 — Grenoble (1 BP) 16 - 20 Agen
- 14 March, 18:30 — Narbonne 23 - 23 Aurillac
- 14 March, 18:30 — Pau 25 - 14 Auch
- 15 March, 14:00 — Albi 30 - 13 Oyonnax
- 15 March, 15:00 — Bourg-en-Bresse 20 - 38 (1 BP) La Rochelle

Round 24

- 21 March, 18:30 — Agen (1 BP) 51 - 16 Béziers
- 21 March, 18:30 — Auch 15 - 12 (1 BP) Oyonnax
- 21 March, 18:30 — La Rochelle 33 - 19 Aurillac
- 21 March, 18:30 — Pau (1 BP) 22 - 27 Bordeaux-Bègles
- 21 March, 18:30 — Racing Métro 25 - 16 Tarbes
- 22 March, 15:00 — Bourg-en-Bresse 24 - 16 Narbonne
- 22 March, 15:00 — Colomiers (1 BP) 31 - 37 Albi
- 22 March, 15:15 — Lyon (1 BP) 45 - 6 Grenoble

Round 25

- 4 April, 18:30 — Aurillac 25 - 15 Colomiers
- 4 April, 18:30 — Béziers (1 BP) 23 - 26 Bourg-en-Bresse
- 4 April, 18:30 — Bordeaux-Bègles 25 - 8 Auch
- 4 April, 18:30 — Grenoble 23 - 16 (1 BP) Narbonne
- 4 April, 18:30 — La Rochelle (1 BP) 23 - 25 Agen
- 4 April, 18:30 — Lyon 25 - 12 Pau
- 4 April, 18:30 — Tarbes 20 - 11 Albi
- 5 April, 15:15 — Oyonnax 28 - 13 Racing Métro

=== Rounds 26 to 30 ===
Round 26

- 11 April, 18:30 — Auch 6 - 16 Tarbes
- 11 April, 18:30 — Béziers 15 - 9 (1 BP) La Rochelle
- 11 April, 18:30 — Grenoble (1 BP) 17 - 20 Aurillac
- 11 April, 18:30 — Narbonne 6 - 26 Lyon
- 11 April, 19:00 — Oyonnax 18 - 17 (1 BP) Bordeaux-Bègles
- 12 April, 15:00 — Bourg-en-Bresse 31 - 12 Pau
- 12 April, 15:00 — Colomiers 19 - 28 Agen
- 12 April, 16:00 — Albi 14 - 26 Racing Métro

Round 27

- 18 April, 18:30 — Aurillac 25 - 24 (1 BP) Béziers
- 18 April, 18:30 — Colomiers (1 BP) 44 - 16 Bordeaux-Bègles
- 18 April, 18:30 — La Rochelle (1 BP) 37 - 16 Narbonne
- 18 April, 18:30 — Pau 11 - 3 Albi
- 18 April, 18:30 — Racing Métro (1 BP) 35 - 13 Auch
- 18 April, 18:30 — Tarbes 24 - 15 Oyonnax
- 19 April, 15:00 — Bourg-en-Bresse 19 - 6 Grenoble
- 19 April, 15:15 — Agen (1 BP) 25 - 0 Lyon

Round 28

- 25 April, 18:30 — Agen 23 - 12 Aurillac
- 25 April, 18:30 — Auch (1 BP) 7 - 11 Albi
- 25 April, 18:30 — Béziers 35 - 19 Tarbes
- 25 April, 18:30 — La Rochelle 23 - 7 Grenoble
- 25 April, 18:30 — Lyon (1 BP) 27 - 10 Bourg-en-Bresse
- 25 April, 18:30 — Narbonne 21 - 15 (1 BP) Pau
- 25 April, 18:30 — Oyonnax 27 - 16 Colomiers
- 26 April, 17:30 — Bordeaux-Bègles 12 - 33 (1 BP) Racing Métro

Round 29

- 2 May, 18:30 — Albi 30 - 23 (1 BP) Agen
- 2 May, 18:30 — Aurillac 37 - 36 (1 BP) Auch
- 2 May, 18:30 — Béziers 37 - 18 Narbonne
- 2 May, 18:30 — Grenoble 10 - 18 Oyonnax
- 2 May, 18:30 — Lyon (1 BP) 30 - 10 Bordeaux-Bègles
- 2 May, 18:30 — Racing Métro (1 BP) 48 - 32 Bourg-en-Bresse
- 2 May, 18:30 — Tarbes 23 - 22 (1 BP) Pau
- 3 May, 14:15 — Colomiers 15 - 29 La Rochelle (1 BP)

Round 30

- 17 May, 14:15 — Agen 32 - 17 Racing Métro
- 17 May, 14:15 — Albi (1 BP) 24 - 6 Béziers
- 17 May, 14:15 — Auch (1 BP) 10 - 12 Lyon
- 17 May, 14:15 — Bordeaux-Bègles (1 BP) 19 - 21 Grenoble
- 17 May, 14:15 — Bourg-en-Bresse (1 BP) 52 - 27 Colomiers
- 17 May, 14:15 — La Rochelle 19 - 13 (1 BP) Tarbes
- 17 May, 14:15 — Narbonne 16 - 29 Oyonnax
- 17 May, 14:15 — Pau (1 BP) 16 - 19 Aurillac

== Promotion playoffs ==
All times CEST.

=== Semi-finals ===
23 May 2009
16:00

Albi	15 – 15 (a.e.t.)	La Rochelle
Pen: Manca (1/1) 12'; Stewart (2/2) 20', 43'; Boulogne (2/2) 54', 94'	Report	Pen: Boboul (4/7) 15', 34', 67', 90'; Drop: Boboul 7'

Stade Municipal, Albi
Attendance: 11,500
Referee: Romain Poite

24 May 2009
15:00

Agen	15 – 18	Oyonnax
Pen: Miquel (5/6) 23', 37', 46', 53', 73'	Report	Pen: Montagnat (5/8) 14', 17', 29', 39', 59'; Bouillot (1/1) 77'

Stade Armandie, Agen
Attendance: 12,500
Referee: David Rosich

- ^1 In the case of a draw at the end of extra-time, the team who has received the fewer red cards goes through. If the number of red cards is the same for both teams, the team that has scored the more tries, then the more penalties qualifies. Albi went through thanks to their 5 penalties to La Rochelle's 4.

=== Final ===
31 May 2009
15:10

Albi	14 – 12	Oyonnax
Try: Lakafia 30' m Pen: Manca (2/5) 43', 50'; Boulogne (1/1) 75'	Report	Pen: Montagnat (3/5) 15', 53', 78'; Drop: Guilloux 33'

Stade Yves-du-Manoir, Montpellier
Attendance: 12,000
Referee: Franck Maciello

== See also ==
- 2008–09 Top 14 season
