= 2010–11 European Challenge Cup pool stage =

2010–11 Amlin Challenge Cup pool stage
- Season: 2010–11 Amlin Challenge Cup
- Date: 7 October 2010 – 23 January 2011

Qualifiers
- Seed 1: (France) Stade Français
- Seed 2: (France) Brive
- Seed 3: (France) La Rochelle
- Seed 4: (England) Harlequins
- Seed 5: (England) London Wasps (from HC)
- Seed 6: (France) Clermont (from HC)
- Seed 7: (Ireland) Munster (from HC)
- Seed 8: (France) Montpellier

The 2010–11 Amlin Challenge Cup pool stage was the opening stage of the 15th season of the European Challenge Cup, the second-tier competition for European rugby union clubs. It began on 7 October 2010 at Kingston Park in Newcastle with a match between Newcastle Falcons and Bourgoin, and was completed on 23 January 2011.

Twenty teams are participating in this competition; they are divided into five pools of four teams each, with each team playing the others home and away. Competition points are earned using the standard bonus point system. The pool winners advanced to the knockout stage, where they were joined by three entrants from the Heineken Cup pool stage. These teams then competed in a single-elimination tournament that ended with the final on 20 May 2011 in Cardiff at Cardiff City Stadium.

== Results ==
All times are local to the game location.

Key to colours
| Winner of each pool advances to quarterfinals. Seed # in parentheses. |

=== Pool 1 ===
| Team | P | W | D | L | Tries for | Tries against | Try diff | Points for | Points against | Points diff | TB | LB | Pts |
|---|---|---|---|---|---|---|---|---|---|---|---|---|---|
| (England) Harlequins (4) | 6 | 5 | 0 | 1 | 21 | 6 | +15 | 189 | 84 | +105 | 3 | 1 | 24 |
| (Ireland) Connacht | 6 | 3 | 0 | 3 | 19 | 8 | +11 | 173 | 99 | +74 | 1 | 2 | 15 |
| (France) Bayonne | 6 | 3 | 0 | 3 | 19 | 12 | +7 | 163 | 116 | +47 | 2 | 1 | 15 |
| (Italy) Cavalieri Prato | 6 | 1 | 0 | 5 | 8 | 41 | −33 | 77 | 303 | −226 | 0 | 0 | 4 |

9 October 2010
15:00

| Cavalieri Prato (Italy) | 23–21 | (Ireland) Connacht |
| Try: Tempestini 56' c Wouter Moore 78' c Con: Wakarua-Noema (2/2); Pen: Wakarua-Noema (3) 35', 61', 58' | Report | Try: Keatley 30' c Upton 45' m Con: Keatley; Pen: Keatley (3) 15', 40', 71' |

Stadio Lungobisenzio, Prato
Attendance: 2,200
Referee: Mathieu Raynal (France)

10 October 2010
18:45

| Bayonne (France) | 16–12 | (England) Harlequins |
| Try: Pietersen 10' m Gerber 44' m Pen: Boyet 33'; Garcia 68' | Report | Pen: Evans (4) 3', 12', 18', 26' |

Stade Jean Dauger, Bayonne
Attendance: 3,500
Referee: Tim Hayes (Wales)

15 October 2010
19:00

| Connacht (Ireland) | 16–13 | (France) Bayonne |
| Try: Cronin 34' m Duffy 65' m Con: Keatley (0/2); Pen: Keatley (2/2) 4', 50' | Report | Try: Roumieu 68' c Con: Peyras-Loustalet (1/1); Pen: Fauque (2/2) 13', 22' |

Sportsground, Galway
Attendance: 1,777
Referee: Carlo Damasco (Italy)

16 October 2010
15:00

| Harlequins (England) | 55–17 | (Italy) Cavalieri Prato |
| Try: Williams(3) 12' m, 61' m, 74' c Chisholm (2) 18' c, 40' c Lowe 22' c Smith 70'; Penalty try 35' c Con: Clegg (6/8) 18', 22', 35', 40', 70', 74'; Pen: Clegg 7' | Report | Try: Majstorovic 53'; Lewis-Pratt 79' c Con: Wakarua-Noema 53' 79'; Pen: Wakarua-Noema 11' |

Twickenham Stoop, London
Attendance: 9,639
Referee: Andrew Macpherson (Scotland)

12 December 2010
17:45

| Harlequins (England) | 20–9 | (Ireland) Connacht |
| Try: Guest 8' c Brown 50' c Con: Evans (2/2); Pen: Evans (2) 15', 27' | Report | Pen: Nikora (3) 17', 40', 57' |

Twickenham Stoop
Attendance: 6,349
Referee: Pascal Gauzere (France)

12 December 2010
18:45

| Bayonne (France) | 65–7 | (Italy) Cavalieri Prato |
| Try: Baget-Rabarou 15' c Gerber (4) 26' c, 40' c, 48' m, 50' c Ziegler (2) 35' c, 70' c Pietersen 38' c Haare 78' m Con: Garcia (6/7); Fauque (1/2) | Report | Try: Petillo 57' c Con: Wakarua (1/1) |

Stade Jean Dauger
Attendance: 5,500
Referee: Leighton Hodges (Wales)

17 December 2010
19:00

| Connacht (Ireland) | 9–15 | (England) Harlequins |
| Pen: Nikora (2) 17', 22'; Keatley 39' | Report | Pen: Evans (5) 4', 21', 30', 36', 40' |

Sportsground
Attendance: 1,600
Referee: James Jones (Wales)

18 December 2010
15:00

| Cavalieri Prato (Italy) | 7–31 | (France) Bayonne |
| Try: Wakarua-Noema 48'; Con: Wakarua-Noema (1/1) | Report | Try: Dwayne Haare 5' c Peyras-Loustalet (2) 41 c, 79 c Penalty try 70' c Con: Boyet (3/3) 5', 41', 70'; Peyras-Loustalett (1/1) 79'; Pen: Boyet (1) 37' |

Campo Montano, Livorno
Attendance: 150
Referee: Dudley Phillips (Ireland)

15 January 2011
20:45

| Bayonne (France) | 21–35 | (Ireland) Connacht |
| Try: Thibault Lacroix 39' c Marc Baget 43' m Con: Julien Audy (1/2) 39'; Pen: Julien Audy 4', 19', 32' | Report | Try: Penalty try 15'c Brian Tuohy 73' m Fionn Carr 77' m Con: Ian Keatley 15'; Pen: Ian Keatley (6) 2', 6', 24', 33', 46', 58' |

Stade Jean Dauger
Referee: Peter Allan (Scotland)

15 January 2011
15:00

| Cavalieri Prato (Italy) | 16–48 | (England) Harlequins |
| Try: Wouter Moore 61' c Con: Rima Wakarua-Noema 61'; Pen: Rima Wakarua-Noema 21', 26', 45' | Report | Try: Maurie Fa'asavalu12' c Danny Care 28' c Sam Smith 50' c, 59' c Tom Casson 66' c Karl Dickson 80' c Con: Rory Clegg (6/6); Pen: Rory Clegg 24', 35' |

Stadio Lungobisenzio
Referee: Tim Hayes (Wales)

22 January 2011
18:00

| Connacht (Ireland) | 83–7 | (Italy) Cavalieri Prato |
| Try: Tuohy 9' m, 15' c, 53' c Keatley 21' c McCarthy 25' c Ta'asu 37' c, 55' c Carr 38' c Cronin 46' c McComish 67' c Adrian Flavin 77' m Ofisa 80' c Con: Keatley (9/11); Miah Nikora (1/1) 80'; Pen: Keatley 20' | Report | Try: Soqueta 12' c Con: Chiesa (1/1) |

Sportsground
Referee: Laurent Cardona (France)

22 January 2011
18:00

| Harlequins (England) | 39–17 | (France) Bayonne |
| Try: Evans 6' c Lowe 41' c, 48' c Monye 71' m Smith 80' c Con: Evans (4/5); Pen: Evans 19', 25' | Report | Try: Filipo 22' m Pen: Garcia 4', 8', 16', 45' |

Twickenham Stoop
Referee: James Jones (Wales)

=== Pool 2 ===
| Team | P | W | D | L | Tries for | Tries against | Try diff | Points for | Points against | Points diff | TB | LB | Pts |
|---|---|---|---|---|---|---|---|---|---|---|---|---|---|
| (France) Brive (2) | 6 | 6 | 0 | 0 | 34 | 3 | +31 | 257 | 54 | +203 | 3 | 0 | 27 |
| (England) Sale Sharks | 6 | 4 | 0 | 2 | 39 | 4 | +35 | 279 | 58 | +221 | 4 | 1 | 21 |
| (Italy) Petrarca Padova | 6 | 1 | 0 | 5 | 10 | 26 | −16 | 88 | 213 | −125 | 1 | 1 | 6 |
| (Spain) El Salvador | 6 | 1 | 0 | 5 | 6 | 56 | −50 | 69 | 368 | −299 | 0 | 0 | 4 |

8 October 2010
19:45

| Sale Sharks (England) | 97–11 | (Spain) El Salvador |
| Try: Koyamaibole 11' c Macleod (2) 13' m, 42' c Tuilagi 16'c Brady (3) 21' m, 63' c, 69' c Bell 29' c Mulchrone (2) 33' m, 67' c Brightwell 51' c Cohen 56' c Jones 60' m Miller 65' c Leck 78' c Con: Hodgson (3/6); Macleod (8/9) | Report | Try: Carter 4' m Pen: Davey (1/1) 15'; Drop: Davey 37' |

Edgeley Park, Stockport
Attendance: 4,666
Referee: Cédric Marchat (France)

8 October 2010
20:00

| Brive (France) | 32–6 | (Italy) Petrarca Rugby |
| Try: Atayi 13' m Caminati 57' c Lespinas 75' c Waqaseduadua 79' c Con: Caminati (3/4); Pen: Caminati (2) 3', 45' | Report | Pen: Walsh 11'; Drop: Walsh 18' |

Stade Municipal, Brive-la-Gaillarde
Attendance: 4,185
Referee: David Jones (Wales)

16 October 2010
15:00

| Petrarca Rugby (Italy) | 9–56 | (England) Sale Sharks |
| Pen: Walsh (3) 13', 27', 49' | Report | Try: Cueto (2) 33' c, 61' c Macleod (2) 23' m, 72' c Brady (2) 17' c, 39' c Miller 80' c Con: Hodgson (4) 17', 33', 39', 61'; Miller (2) 72', 80'; Pen: Hodgson (3) 15', 19', 31' |

Stadio Plebiscito, Padua
Attendance: 1,050
Referee: Dudley Phillips (Ireland)

16 October 2010
16:30

| El Salvador (Spain) | 3–116 | (France) Brive |
| Pen: Davey 37' | Report | Try: Cabello (3) 11' c, 22' c, 30' c Jeanjean (5) 13' c, 19' m, 41' c, 47' c, 72' c Vosloo 25' c Caminati (2) 33' c, 65' c Spedding (3) 52 m', 55' c, 79' c Domingo 59' m Perry 70' c Ribes 74' c Con: Caminati (14/17); Pen: Caminati 5' |

Campo de Pepe Rojo, Valladolid
Attendance: 1,200
Referee: Owen Morris (Wales)

11 December 2010
15:00

| Petrarca Rugby (Italy) | 37–10 | (Spain) El Salvador |
| Try: Acuna (2) 2' c, 12' m Ansell (2) 18' c, 59' m Galatro 33' m Caporello 48' m Con: Alb. Chillon (2/6); Pen: Walsh 8' | Report | Try: Gascon 37' c Con: Nava (1/1); Pen: Gascon 43' |

Centre Geremia, Padua
Attendance: 150
Referee: Cédric Marchat (France)

11 December 2010
20:45

| Brive (France) | 18–9 | (England) Sale Sharks |
| Try: Palisson (2) 12' m, 24' c Con: Caminati (1/2); Pen: Caminati (2) 2', 20' | Report | Pen: Macleod (3) 15', 27', 37' |

Stade Municipal
Attendance: 3,200
Referee: John Lacey (Ireland)

19 December 2010
12:00

| El Salvador (Spain) | 37–16 | (Italy) Petrarca Rugby |
| Try: Nava 21' c Criado 42' c Penalty try 80' m Con: Nava (2/3); Pen: Nava (6) 6', 41', 47', 60', 73', 78' | Report | Try: Cavalieri 9'; Costa Repetto 64'; Pen: Alb. Chillon 18', 39' |

Campo de Pepe Rojo
Attendance: 800
Referee: Laurent Cardona (France)

19 December 2010
15:00

| Sale Sharks (England) | 13–15 | (France) Brive |
| Try: Tait 35' c Con: Macleod; Pen: Macleod (2) 3', 25' | Report | Pen: Caminati (5) 6', 11', 29', 40', 80' |

Netherdale, Galashiels
Attendance: 98
Referee: Andrew Macpherson (Scotland)

14 January 2011
19:30

| Brive (France) | 52–3 | (Spain) El Salvador |
| Try: Spedding 20' c Bonrepaux 42' c Elgoyhen (3) 48' c, 62' c, 70' c Popham 56' m Palisson 74' c Atayi 80' m Con: Caminati (1/1); Palisson (5/7) | Report | Pen: Gascón 5' |

Stade Municipal
Attendance: 2,700
Referee: Alan Falzone (Italy)

14 January 2011
19:45

| Sale Sharks (England) | 54–0 | (Italy) Petrarca Rugby |
| Try: Brightwell 11' c McMillan 18' m Miller 22' c Macleod 32' c Thomas 44' c Cliff 49' c Tait 60' c Kennedy 78' c Con: Miller (7/8) | Report |

Edgeley Park
Attendance: 4,421
Referee: Leighton Hodges (Wales)

22 January 2011
15:00

| El Salvador (Spain) | 5–50 | (England) Sale Sharks |
| Try: Mai 13' m | Report | Try: Kennedy 11' c, 27' c Tait 21'c Mulchrone 31' c Miller 45' m Tonetti 56' c Jones 74' m Imiolek 80' m Con: Miller (5/8) |

Campo de Pepe Rojo
Referee: Stefano Penne (Italy)

22 January 2011
15:00

| Petrarca Rugby (Italy) | 20–24 | (France) Brive |
| Try: Ansell 68' c Gega 78' c Con: Sanchez 68'; Favaretto 78'; Pen: Sanchez 46'; Ansell 53' | Report | Try: Jonathan Elgoyhen 17' c, 21' c Caminati 62' c Con: Caminati (3/3); Pen: Caminati 14' |

Stadio Plebiscito
Referee: Andrew Macpherson (Scotland)

=== Pool 3 ===
| Team | P | W | D | L | Tries for | Tries against | Try diff | Points for | Points against | Points diff | TB | LB | Pts |
|---|---|---|---|---|---|---|---|---|---|---|---|---|---|
| (France) Montpellier (8) | 6 | 5 | 0 | 1 | 10 | 11 | −1 | 147 | 101 | +46 | 1 | 0 | 21 |
| (England) Exeter Chiefs | 6 | 3 | 0 | 3 | 16 | 10 | +6 | 154 | 113 | +41 | 1 | 6 | 16 |
| (France) Bourgoin | 6 | 2 | 0 | 4 | 10 | 12 | −2 | 119 | 130 | −11 | 2 | 1 | 11 |
| (England) Newcastle Falcons | 6 | 2 | 0 | 4 | 7 | 10 | −3 | 66 | 142 | −76 | 0 | 1 | 9 |

7 October 2010
19:45

| Newcastle Falcons (England) | 22–16 | (France) Bourgoin |
| Try: Manning 19' m Graham 24' c Fielden 62' c Con: Manning (1/2); Hodgson (1/1); Pen: Manning (1/2) 54' | Report | Try: Gondrand 69' c Con: Laloo (1/1); Pen: Laloo (3/3) 4', 12', 56' |

Kingston Park Stadium, Newcastle
Attendance: 3,887
Referee: Carlo Damasco (Italy)

9 October 2010
15:00

| Exeter Chiefs (England) | 13–20 | (France) Montpellier |
| Try: Slade 68' c Con: Dollman (1/1); Pen: Davis (2) 5', 23' | Report | Try: Pelo 16' c Tuilevuka 43' c Con: Lagarde (2/2); Pen: Lagarde (2) 8', 19' |

Sandy Park, Exeter
Attendance: 5,437
Referee: Andrew Macpherson (Scotland)

14 October 2010
20:45

| Montpellier (France) | 32–8 | (England) Newcastle Falcons |
| Try: Doumayrou 56' c Tuilevuka 65' c Con: Paillaugue (2/2); Pen: Paillaugue (6) 6', 17', 40', 44', 53', 61' | Report | Try: Fielden 29' m Con: Hodgson (0/1); Pen: Hodgson 21' |

Stade Yves-du-Manoir, Montpellier
Attendance: 9,674
Referee: Neil Paterson (Scotland)

15 October 2010
19:30

| Bourgoin (France) | 19–34 | (England) Exeter Chiefs |
| Try: Labrit 9' m Va'aulu 42' c Nasiganiyavi 79' c Con: Laloo (0/1); Viazzo (2/2) | Report | Try: Rennie 18' c Thomas 32' c Foster 55' m Con: Steenson (2/3); Pen: Steenson (5) 2', 6', 12', 36', 44' |

Stade Pierre-Rajon, Bourgoin-Jallieu
Attendance: 5,800
Referee: James Jones (Wales)

9 December 2010
20:45

| Montpellier (France) | 39–14 | (France) Bourgoin |
| Try: Fernández 15' c Bustos Moyano 47' m Giraud 57' c Caudullo 61' m Con: Bustos Moyano (2/4); Pen: Bustos Moyano (4) 4', 27', 39', 41'; Lagarde 80' | Report | Try: Nasiganiyavi 9' c Penalty try 25' c Con: Viazzo (2/2) |

Stade Yves du Manoir, Montpellier
Attendance: 4,500
Referee: Dudley Phillips (Ireland)

11 December 2010
15:00

| Exeter Chiefs (England) | 36–10 | (England) Newcastle Falcons |
| Try: Moon 16' c Stupple 27' c Jess 39' m Slade 55' c Higgins 74' c Con: Davis (3/4); Dollman (1/1); Pen: Davis 16' | Report | Try: Young 47' m Williams 63' m |

Sandy Park
Attendance: 5,728
Referee: Neil Paterson (Scotland)

18 December 2010
20:45

| Bourgoin (France) | 36–18 | (France) Montpellier |
| Try: Coux 11' c Forest 56' m Jooste 62' m Tulou 80' c Con: Di Bernardo(2/4); Pen: Di Bernardo(4) 27', 48', 64', 79' | Report | Pen: Lagarde (5) 4', 15', 24', 36', 38'; Drop: Lagarde 68' |

Stade Pierre Rajon
Attendance: 3,000
Referee: Greg Garner (England)

19 December 2010
15:00

| Newcastle Falcons (England) | 26–24 | (England) Exeter Chiefs |
| Try: Bobo 30' m Con: Gopperth (0/1); Pen: Gopperth (5) 4', 9', 26', 40', 43'; Manning 80'; Drop: Manning 68' | Report | Try: Dollman 63' m Foster 77' c Con: Steenson 77'; Pen: Davis 2', 21', 52', 67' |

Netherdale, Galashiels
Attendance: 450
Referee: Iain Heard (Scotland)

14 January 2011
20:00

| Newcastle Falcons (England) | 0–6 | (France) Montpellier |
| | Report | Pen: Benoît Paillaugue 14', 23' |

Kingston Park Stadium
Referee: Andrew Macpherson (Scotland)

15 January 2011
19:45

| Exeter Chiefs (England) | 17–6 | (France) Bourgoin |
| Try: Tom Johnson 42' c Hoani Tui 77' c Con: Ryan Davis 42'; Gareth Steenson 77'; Pen: Ryan Davis 40' | Report | Pen: Alberto Di Bernardo 52', 61' |

Sandy Park
Referee: Carlo Damasco (Italy)

23 January 2011

| Bourgoin (France) | 28–0^{1} | (England) Newcastle Falcons |

Stade Pierre Rajon
Referee: Neil Paterson (Scotland)

22 January 2011
20:45

| Montpellier (France) | 32–30 | (England) Exeter Chiefs |
| Try: Shvelidze 31' c Doumayrou 76' c Con: Lagarde (2/2); Pen: Lagarde 8', 17', 46', 56', 64' 67' | Report | Try: Arscott 6' c Jess 22' c, 50' c Con: Ryan Davis (3/3); Pen: Ryan Davis 13', 59', 72' |

Stade Yves du Manoir, Montpellier
Referee: Dudley Phillips (Ireland)

- ^{^1}: Bourgoin were awarded a five-point 28–0 win by the ERC after Newcastle refused to play and left before a pitch inspection on January 23.

=== Pool 4 ===
| Team | P | W | D | L | Tries for | Tries against | Try diff | Points for | Points against | Points diff | TB | LB | Pts |
|---|---|---|---|---|---|---|---|---|---|---|---|---|---|
| (France) Stade Français (1) | 6 | 6 | 0 | 0 | 29 | 7 | +22 | 216 | 73 | +143 | 5 | 0 | 29 |
| (England) Leeds Carnegie | 6 | 4 | 0 | 2 | 24 | 6 | +18 | 173 | 88 | +85 | 3 | 0 | 19 |
| (Romania) București Oaks | 6 | 1 | 0 | 5 | 4 | 17 | −13 | 74 | 148 | −54 | 0 | 1 | 5 |
| (Italy) Crociati Parma | 6 | 1 | 0 | 5 | 3 | 30 | −27 | 70 | 224 | −137 | 0 | 1 | 5 |

7 October 2010
20:45

| Stade Français (France) | 57–6 | (Italy) Crociati Parma |
| Try: Plisson 7' c Phillips (2) 21' c, 53' c M. Rodríguez (2) 27' c, 55' c Southwell 30' m Boussès 45' m Liebenberg 62' m Tardy 76' c Con: Oelschig (6/9) | Report | Pen: Anversa (1/1) 2'; Iannone (1/1) 47' |

Stade Charléty, Paris
Attendance: 6,523
Referee: Dudley Phillips (Ireland)

9 October 2010
15:00

| București Oaks (Romania) | 9–23 | (England) Leeds Carnegie |
| Pen: Vlaicu (3) 6', 25', 80+2' | Report | Try: Penalty try 55'; Fa'afili 80+4' c Con: Lewis-Pratt 55'; Thomas 70'; Pen: Lewis-Pratt 38', 68'; Thomas 80+4' |

Arcul de Triumf, Bucharest
Attendance: 794
Referee: Laurent Cardona (France)

16 October 2010
15:00

| București Oaks (Romania) | 20–19 | (Italy) Crociati Parma |
| Try: Nicolae 80' m Pen: Dumbravă (5) 3', 6', 14', 35', 69' | Report | Try: Ferrarini 23' c Con: Anversa (1/1); Pen: Anversa (4) 40', 43', 65', 74' |

Arcul de Triumf
Attendance: 699
Referee: Tim Hayes (Wales)

17 October 2010
17:45

| Leeds Carnegie (England) | 13–22 | (France) Stade Français |
| Try: Gomez 15' m Fourie 21' m Pen: Thomas 60' | Report | Try: Boussès 55' c Con: Rodríguez 55'; Pen: Rodríguez (4) 37', 42', 50', 78'; Drop: Rodríguez 74' |

Headingley, Leeds
Attendance: 4,151
Referee: Peter Allan (Scotland)

11 December 2010
15:00

| București Oaks (Romania) | 20–29 | (France) Stade Français |
| Try: Burcea 5' c Lemnaru 40' c Con: Dumbravă (2/2); Pen: Valentin Calafateanu (2) 50', 75' | Report | Try: Bonneval 11' m Sempéré 17' c Papé 25' c Parisse 45' c Con: Dupuy (3/4); Pen: Oelschig 80' |

Arcul de Triumf
Attendance: 2,500
Referee: Alan Falzone (Italy)

12 December 2010
15:00

| Leeds Carnegie (England) | 55–6 | (Italy) Crociati Parma |
| Try: Wentzel (2) 12'c, 61' c Thomas 49' c Blackett (2) 30' m, 42'm Fa'afili 77'; Wackett 66' c Hinton 72' c Con: Thomas(3) 12', 49', 61'; Hinton (3) 66', 72', 77'; Pen: Thomas 9' | Report | Pen: Iannone 11', 40' |

Headingley
Attendance: 1,713
Referee: Tim Hayes (Wales)

16 December 2010
20:45

| Stade Français (France) | 35–7 | (Romania) București Oaks |
| Try: Rabadan (2) 11' c, 35' c Sempéré 24' c Flanquart 44' c Tiesi 54' c Con: Dupuy (4/4); Oelschig (1/1) | Report | Try: Lemnaru 64' c Con: Vlaicu (1/1) |

Stade Charléty
Attendance: 3,000
Referee: Stefano Penne (Italy)

19 December 2010
14:30

| Crociati Parma (Italy) | 6–44 | (England) Leeds Carnegie |
| Pen: Iannone (2) 30', 33' | Report | Try: Penalty try 5' c Stephenson 25' m Nilsen 55' m Oakley 60' c Burrell 68' c Fa'afili (2) 72' m, 76' m Con: Thomas (3/7) 5', 60', 68'; Pen: Thomas 38' |

Stadio XXV Aprile
Attendance: 200
Referee: Cédric Marchat (France)

15 January 2011
15:00

| Crociati Parma (Italy) | 16–12 | (Romania) București Oaks |
| Try: Penalty try 47' c Con: Iannone (1/1); Pen: Iannone (2) 33', 61'; Anversa 73' | Report | Pen: Dumbravă (4) 3', 12', 31', 56' |

Stadio XXV Aprile
Attendance: 370
Referee: Mathieu Raynal (France)

16 January 2011
18:45

| Stade Français (France) | 39–10 | (England) Leeds Carnegie |
| Try: Southwell 30' c Phillips 35' m Roncero 42' c Rabadan 47' c Arias 80' c Con: Beauxis (3/4); Oelschig (1/1); Pen: Beauxis (2) 4', 14' | Report | Try: Browne 63' c Con: Thomas (1/1); Pen: Thomas 2' |

Stade Charléty
Referee: John Lacey (Ireland)

23 January 2011
15:00

| Crociati Parma (Italy) | 17–34 | (France) Stade Français |
| Try: Lome Fa'atau 29' m Pen: Tommaso Iannone 16', 35'; Marco Anversa 43', 58' | Report | Try: Djibril Camara 6' m, 14' c Quentin Valançon 17' c Pierre Rabadan 54' c Hugo Bonneval 70' m Con: Noël Oelschig (3/5); Drop: Jules Plisson 26' |

Stadio XXV Aprile
Referee: Leighton Hodges (Wales)

23 January 2011
14:00

| Leeds Carnegie (England) | 26–6 | (Romania) București Oaks |
| Try: Tadulala 31' m Wentzel 60' c Alonso 69' c Burrell 73' c Con: Lewis-Pratt (3/4) | Report | Pen: Florin Vlaicu 14', 26' |

Headingley
Referee: Carlo Damasco (Italy)

=== Pool 5 ===
| Team | P | W | D | L | Tries for | Tries against | Try diff | Points for | Points against | Points diff | TB | LB | Pts |
|---|---|---|---|---|---|---|---|---|---|---|---|---|---|
| (France) La Rochelle (3) | 6 | 5 | 0 | 1 | 26 | 10 | +16 | 197 | 91 | +106 | 3 | 1 | 24 |
| (England) Gloucester | 6 | 4 | 0 | 2 | 35 | 7 | +28 | 255 | 77 | +178 | 3 | 2 | 21 |
| (France) Agen | 6 | 3 | 0 | 3 | 21 | 18 | +3 | 167 | 158 | +9 | 2 | 1 | 15 |
| (Italy) Rugby Rovigo | 6 | 0 | 0 | 6 | 6 | 53 | −47 | 55 | 348 | −293 | 0 | 0 | 0 |

8 October 2010
18:30

| Agen (France) | 26–19 | (England) Gloucester |
| Try: Fonua (2) 54' c, 79' c Con: Courrent (2/2); Pen: Courrent (4/6) 17', 49', 64', 77' | Report | Try: Lawson 23' c Con: Robinson (1/1); Pen: Robinson (4/4) 8', 11', 67', 72' |

Stade Armandie, Agen
Attendance: 7,395
Referee: Neil Paterson (Scotland)

9 October 2010
15:00

| Rugby Rovigo (Italy) | 3–38 | (France) La Rochelle |
| Pen: Bustos 25' | Report | Try: Ninard 10' m Penalty try 32' c D'Aram de Valada 40' c Ferrou '57 m Devade 60' c Pani 77' c Con: Dambielle (4/6) |

Stadio Mario Battaglini, Rovigo
Attendance: 500
Referee: Gwyn Morris (Wales)

16 October 2010
15:00

| Gloucester (England) | 90–7 | (Italy) Rugby Rovigo |
| Try: Morgan (2) 32' m, 65' m Simpson-Daniel (2) 4' c, 30' c Trinder 53' m May (3) 27' c, 43' c, 72' c Vainikolo (2) 39' c, 41' c Burns 14'c Hazell 2' c Penalty try 25' c Sharples 79' m Con: Burns (9/12); Robinson(1/2) 72' | Report | Try: Bustos 49' c Con: Bustos |

Kingsholm, Gloucester
Attendance: 9,204
Referee: Mathieu Raynal (France)

16 October 2010
20:45

| La Rochelle (France) | 30–23 | (France) Agen |
| Try: Bordoy 40' c Carmignani 43' m Le Bourhis 55' c Ferrou 76' m Con: Lacoste (2) 8', 30'; Pen: Lacoste (2/4) | Report | Try: Machenaud 32' c Mondoulet 46' c Con: Barnard (3) 15', 36', 68'; Pen: Barnard (2/2) |

Stade Marcel-Deflandre, La Rochelle
Attendance: 9,500
Referee: Greg Garner (England)

11 December 2010
15:00

| Rugby Rovigo (Italy) | 10–33 | (France) Agen |
| Try: Zorzi 61' c Con: Bustos (1/1); Pen: Bustos 18' | Report | Try: Swiryn (2) 8' c, 71' c Penalty try 21' c Monribot 32' c Kolinisau 44' m Con: Barnard (4/5) |

Stadio Mario Battaglini
Attendance: 650
Referee: Andrew Macpherson (Scotland)

11 December 2010
18:30

| La Rochelle (France) | 6–13 | (England) Gloucester |
| Pen: Dambielle (2) 5', 70' | Report | Try: Simpson-Daniel 24' c Con: Robinson (1/1); Pen: Burns (2) 65', 68' |

Stade Marcel-Deflandre
Attendance: 9,800
Referee: Carlo Damasco (Italy)

18 December 2010
14:30

| Agen (France) | 61–11 | (Italy) Rugby Rovigo |
| Try: Fonua (2) 11' m, 29' c Penalty try 18' c Faʻaoso 25' c Vaka (2) 31' c, 46' c Avramovic 40' c Pelesasa (2) 62' c, 67' c Con: Barnard (8/9) | Report | Try: Ravalle 49' m Pen: Basson (2) 14', 27' |

Stade Armandie
Attendance: 6,000
Referee: David Jones (Wales)

19 December 2010
17:45

| Gloucester (England) | 18–24 | (France) La Rochelle |
| Try: Vainikolo (2) 32' m, 62' m Burns 76' m Pen: Robinson 17' | Report | Try: Soucaze 8' c Garcia 39' m Con: Dambielle (4) 16', 27', 47', 66'; Pen: Dambielle (1/2) 8' |

Kingsholm
Attendance: 9,324
Referee: Leighton Hodges (Wales)

13 January 2011
20:45

| Agen (France) | 17–28 | (France) La Rochelle |
| Try: Mach 17' c Vaka 39' c Con: Bales (1/1); Cazeaux (1/1); Pen: Cazeaux 41' | Report | Try: Combezou 12' c Clement (2) 72' c, 75' m Con: Goosen (2/3); Pen: Goosen (3) 21', 28', 62' |

Stade Armandie
Attendance: 5,813
Referee: JP Doyle (England)

15 January 2011
15:00

| Rugby Rovigo (Italy) | 7–55 | (England) Gloucester |
| Try: Anouer 58' c Con: Bustos (1/1) | Report | Try: Trinder (2) 9' c, 14' c Hazell 25' m Sharples (2) 31' m, 46' c Taylor 73' c, 77' c May 79' c Con: Burns (3/5); Taylor (3/3); Pen: Burns 4' |

Stadio Mario Battaglini
Attendance: 800
Referee: Graham Knox (Scotland)

20 January 2011
19:45

| Gloucester (England) | 60–7 | (France) Agen |
| Try: Simpson-Daniel 1' c, 61 c Burns 11' c Trinder 28' c, 35' c Voyce 40' c Morgan 63' m Narraway 77' c Con: Burns (5/5) 1', 11', 28', 35', 40'; Taylor (2/3) 61', 77'; Pen: Burns 9', 23' | Report | Try: Monribot 48'; Con: Barnard 48' |

Kingsholm
Attendance: 8,504
Referee: Andrew Macpherson (Scotland)

20 January 2011
20:45

| La Rochelle (France) | 71–17 | (Italy) Rugby Rovigo |
| Try: Dall'Igna (3) 4' c, 17' c, 48' m Jacob 13' c Boboul 31' m Penalty try 42' c Faasalele (2) 59' c, 66' c Lebourhis 62' c Goosen 76' m Neveu 80' c Con: Goosen (8/11) | Report | Try: Bacchetti 38' c Foschi 71' c Con: Bustos (2/2); Drop: Bustos 1' |

Stade Marcel-Deflandre
Referee: Tim Hayes (Wales)

== See also ==
- European Challenge Cup
- 2010–11 Heineken Cup
