= List of 2014–15 Top 14 transfers =

This is a list of player transfers involving Top14 teams between the end of the 2013–14 season and up to the 2014–15 season.

== Bayonne ==
=== Players In ===
- (New Zealand) Blair Stewart from (France) Grenoble
- (Georgia (country)) Giogi Jgenti from (France) Perpignan
- (France) Lukas Pointud from (France) Tarbes
- (Samoa) Pelu Taele from (France) Biarritz
- (France) Thibault Visensang from (France) Albi
- (Argentina) Benjamin Macome from (France) Stade Français
- (Australia) Lalakai Foketi from (Australia) Melbourne Rebels

=== Players Out ===
- (France) Guillaume Bernad to (France) Oyonnax
- (France) Julien Puricelli to (France) Lyon
- (New Zealand) Neemia Tialata to (France) Toulouse
- (New Zealand) Stephen Brett to (France) Lyon
- (France) Mathieu Bélie to (France) Perpignan
- (France) Victor Manukula to (France) Béziers
- (France) Pierre-Philippe Lafond to (France) Montauban
- (Morocco) Abdellatif Boutaty to (France) Pau
- (South Africa) Sam Gerber retired
- (Tonga) Manu Ahotaeiloa

== Bordeaux ==
=== Players In ===
- (France) Lionel Beauxis from (France) Toulouse
- (Argentina) Francisco Gomez Kodela from (France) Biarritz
- (France) Julien Le Devedec from (France) Brive
- (France) Yann Lesgourgues from (France) Biarritz
- (France) Sébastien Taofifenua from (France) Perpignan
- (France) Bertrand Guiry from (France) Perpignan
- (France) Sofiane Guitoune from (France) Perpignan
- (South Africa) Berend Botha from (France) Mont-de-Marsan
- (France) Paulin Riva from (France) Auch

=== Players Out ===
- (France) Jean-Charles Fidinde to (France) Narbonne
- (Romania) Silviu Florea retired
- (Spain) Gauthier Gibouin to (France) Montauban
- (Argentina) Nicolás Sánchez
- (Australia) Cameron Treloar
- (France) Aliki Fakaté retired
- (Australia) Poutasi Luafutu to (France) Brive
- (France) Emmanuel Saubusse to (France) Mont-de-Marsan
- (France) Gilen Queheille to (France) Tarbes
- (France) Jean-Baptiste Lamotte to (France) Tarbes
- (Argentina) Rafael Carballo
- (Argentina) Joaquin Tuculet
- (New Zealand) Bruce Reihana retired

== Brive ==
=== Players In ===
- (France) Damien Jourdain from (France) Bourg-en-Bresse
- (France) Thomas Acquier from (France) Carcassonne
- (France) Russlan Boukerou from (France) Auch
- (South Africa) Peet Marais from (South Africa) Sharks
- (Australia) Poutasi Luafutu from (France) Bordeaux Bègles
- (France) Nicolas Bézy from (France) Grenoble
- Benito Masilevu from Fiji VII

=== Players Out ===
- (Samoa) Tamato Leupolu
- (France) Victor Laval
- (France) Julien Le Devedec to (France) Bordeaux Bègles
- (Fiji) Apisai Naikatini
- (France) Laurent Ferrères retired

== Castres ==
=== Players In ===
- (Scotland) Johnnie Beattie from (France) Montpellier
- (France) Julien Dumora from (France) Lyon
- (New Zealand) Paea Faʻanunu from (France) Montpellier
- (France) Yohan Montes from (France) Toulouse
- (New Zealand) Sitiveni Sivivatu from (France) Clermont Auvergne
- (France) Thomas Combezou from (France) Montpellier

=== Players Out ===
- (France) Paul Bonnefond to (France) Lyon
- (France) Antonie Claassen to (France) Racing Métro
- (South Africa) Michael Coetzee
- (France) Brice Dulin to (France) Racing Métro
- (Georgia (country)) Anton Peikrishvili to (France) Racing Métro
- (France) Julien Tomas to (France) Stade Français Paris
- (Fiji) Seremaia Bai to (England) Leicester Tigers
- (South Africa) Pedrie Wannenburg to (France) Oyonnax
- (France) Romain Teulet retired
- Pierre-Gilles Lakafia to France VII

== Clermont ==
=== Players In ===
- (France) Sébastien Vahaamahina from (France) Perpignan
- (Wales) Jonathan Davies from (Wales) Scarlets
- (Australia) John Ulugia from (France) Bourg-en-Bresse
- (New Zealand) Zac Guildford from (New Zealand) Crusaders
- (England) Nick Abendanon from (England) Bath Rugby
- (Portugal) Pedro Bettencourt from (Portugal) Lusitanos XV
- (Georgia (country)) Viktor Kolelishvili from (France) Lyon
- (France) Camille Lopez from (France) Perpignan

=== Players Out ===
- (New Zealand) Regan King to (Wales) Scarlets
- (Wales) Lee Byrne to (Wales) Newport Gwent Dragons
- (New Zealand) Sitiveni Sivivatu to (France) Castres Olympique
- (France) Benoit Cabello to (France) Perpignan
- (Scotland) Nathan Hines to (England) Sale Sharks
- (South Africa) Gerhard Vosloo to (France) Toulon
- (France) Elvis Vermeulen retired

== Grenoble ==
=== Players In ===
- (South Africa) Gio Aplon from (South Africa) Stormers
- (France) Julien Brugnaut from (France) Racing Métro
- (Ireland) Chris Farrell from (Ireland) Ulster
- (New Zealand) Rory Grice from (New Zealand) Waikato
- (South Africa) Charl McLeod from (South Africa) Sharks
- (South Africa) Ross Skeate from (France) Agen
- (New Zealand) Jackson Willison from (New Zealand) Blues
- (France) Jonathan Wisniewski from (France) Racing Métro
- (South Africa) Paul Willemse from (South Africa) Blue Bulls
- (Australia) Jono Owen from (Australia) Queensland Reds

=== Players Out ===
- (England) Olly Barkley to (England) London Welsh
- (France) Cédric Béal to (France) Mont-de-Marsan
- (South Africa) Roland Bernard
- (France) Vincent Campo to (France) Pau
- (France) Olivier Chaplain
- (South Africa) Rudi Coetzee
- (France) Romain David to (France) Dax
- (Ireland) Andrew Farley
- (South Africa) Altenstad Hulme
- (Bosnia and Herzegovina) Kenan Mutapcic
- (France) Florian Ninard
- (France) Flavien Nouhaillaguet
- (Canada) Shane O'Leary to (Ireland) Connacht
- (South Africa) Shaun Sowerby
- (New Zealand) Blair Stewart to (France) Bayonne
- (France) Mathieu Lorée to (France) Lyon

== La Rochelle ==
=== Players In ===
- (Australia) Alofa Alofa from (Australia) Waratahs
- (New Zealand) Romana Graham from (England) Exeter Chiefs
- (France) Jean-Marc Doussain from (France) Toulouse
- (Fiji) Jone Qovu from (France) Racing Métro

== Lyon ==
=== Players In ===
- (New Zealand) Hoani Tui from (England) Exeter Chiefs
- (France) Emmanuel Felsina from (France) Toulon
- (France) Pierrick Gunther from (France) Toulon
- (France) Julien Puricelli from (France) Bayonne
- (New Zealand) Stephen Brett from (France) Bayonne
- (France) Paul Bonnefond from (France) Montpellier
- (France) Karim Ghezal from (France) Racing Métro
- (France) Fabrice Estebanez from (France) Racing Métro
- (South Africa) Deon Fourie from (South Africa) Stormers
- (France) Jerome Porical from (France) Stade Français
- (France) Mathieu Lorée from (France) Grenoble
- (France) Vincent Martin from (France) Toulon
- (Australia) George Smith from (Japan) Suntory Sungoliath
- (Fiji) Masi Matadigo from (France) Racing Métro

== Montpellier ==
=== Players In ===
- (France) Antoine Battut from (France) Racing Métro
- (France) Benjamin Fall from (France) Racing Métro
- (France) Teddy Iribaren from (France) Tarbes
- (Australia) Ben Mowen from (Australia) Brumbies
- (Fiji) Akapusi Qera from (France) Toulouse
- Samisoni Viriviri from Fiji VII
- (New Zealand) Tom Donnelly from (New Zealand) Blues
- (South Africa) Pat Cilliers from (South Africa) Stormers

=== Players Out ===
- (France) Yoan Audrin to (France) Racing Métro
- (Scotland) Johnnie Beattie to (France) Castres
- (France) Eric Escande to (France) Toulon
- (New Zealand) Paea Faʻanunu to (France) Castres
- (Georgia (country)) Mamuka Gorgodze to (France) Toulon
- (New Zealand) Paul Grant to (England) Nottingham
- (Scotland) Jim Hamilton to (England) Saracens
- (Argentina) Juan Figallo to (England) Saracens
- (South Africa) JP du Plessis to (South Africa) Free State Cheetahs

== Oyonnax ==
=== Players In ===
- (Samoa) Maurie Fa'asavalu from (England) Harlequins
- (Tonga) Soane Tongaʻuiha from (France) Racing Metro
- (South Africa) Pedrie Wannenburg from (France) Castres Olympique
- (South Africa) Riaan Smit from (South Africa) Cheetahs

=== Players Out ===
- (Argentina) Lucas González Amorosino to (Wales) Cardiff Blues

== Racing Métro ==
=== Players In ===
- (Argentina) Tomás Lavanini from (Argentina) Hindú
- (France) Yoan Audrin from (France) Montpellier
- (France) Antonie Claassen from (France) Castres
- (France) Brice Dulin from (France) Castres
- (Georgia (country)) Anton Peikrishvili from (France) Castres
- (France) Teddy Thomas from (France) Biarritz
- (New Zealand) Casey Laulala from (Ireland) Munster
- (Wales) Luke Charteris from (France) Perpignan
- (South Africa) Johan Goosen from (South Africa) Cheetahs

=== Players Out ===
- (France) Antoine Battut to (France) Montpellier
- (France) Julien Brugnaut to (France) Grenoble
- (France) Benjamin Fall to (France) Montpellier
- (France) Karim Ghezal to (France) Lyon
- (Fiji) Masi Matadigo to (France) Lyon
- (Fiji) Jone Qovu to (France) La Rochelle
- (France) Jonathan Wisniewski to (France) Grenoble
- (France) Fabrice Estebanez to (France) Lyon

== Stade Français ==
=== Players In ===
- (France) Raphaël Lakafia from (France) Biarritz
- (Australia) Hugh Pyle from (Australia) Melbourne Rebels
- (France) Julien Tomas from (France) Castres
- (New Zealand) Krisnan Inu from (Australia) Canterbury Bulldogs (NRL)

== Toulon ==
=== Players In ===
- (France) Fabien Barcella from (France) Biarritz
- (France) Nicolas Durand from (France) Perpignan
- (France) Éric Escande from (France) Montpellier
- (Georgia (country)) Mamuka Gorgodze from (France) Montpellier
- (France) Guilhem Guirado from (France) Perpignan
- (Wales) Leigh Halfpenny from (Wales) Cardiff Blues
- (Argentina) Juan Martín Hernández (free agent) (Short-term deal effective January 2015)
- (Australia) James O'Connor from (England) London Irish (Short-term deal)
- (France) Romain Taofifenua from (France) Perpignan
- (South Africa) Gerhard Vosloo from (France) Clermont

=== Players Out ===
- (France) Emmanuel Felsina to (France) Lyon
- (France) Pierrick Gunther to (France) Lyon (on loan)
- (France) Vincent Martin to (France) Lyon
- (France) Benjamin Noirot to (France) Biarritz
- (Australia) James O'Connor to (Australia) Queensland Reds (from January 2015)
- (France) Alexis Palisson to (France) Toulouse
- (South Africa) Danie Rossouw retired
- (England) Andrew Sheridan retired
- (South Africa) Joe van Niekerk retired
- (England) Jonny Wilkinson retired

== Toulouse ==
=== Players In ===
- (England) Toby Flood from (England) Leicester
- (New Zealand) Corey Flynn from (New Zealand) Crusaders
- (France) Imanol Harinordoquy from (France) Biarritz
- (France) Alexis Palisson from (France) Toulon
- (New Zealand) Neemia Tialata from (France) Bayonne

=== Players Out ===
- (France) Jean-Pascal Barraque to (France) La Rochelle
- (France) Lionel Beauxis to (France) Bordeaux-Bègles
- (Georgia (country)) Jaba Bregvadze released
- (France) Bastien Chalureau to (France) Perpignan
- (France) Yves Donguy to (France) Oyonnax
- (New Zealand) Hosea Gear to (Japan) Honda Heat
- (France) Antoine Guillamon to (France) Oyonnax
- (New Zealand) Alex Luatua to (France) Oyonnax
- (France) Pierre Maurens to (France) Carcassonne
- (France) Yohan Montes to (France) Castres
- (France) Jean-Bernard Pujol to (France) Perpignan
- (Fiji) Akapusi Qera to (France) Montpellier

== See also ==
- List of 2014–15 Premiership Rugby transfers
- List of 2014–15 Pro12 transfers
- List of 2014–15 Super Rugby transfers
- List of 2014–15 RFU Championship transfers
