= Mutapčić =

Mutapčić (Cyrillic Мутапчић) is a Bosnian family name. Notable people with the surname include the following:

- Abdulah Mutapčić (born 1932), Bosnian politician
- Elvis Mutapčić (born 1986), Bosnian-American mixed martial artist
- Emir Mutapčić (born 1960), Bosnian basketball player and coach
- Kenan Mutapčić (born 1979) Bosnian rugby union football player in France
