= Chad Slade =

Chad Slade may refer to:

- Chad Slade (rugby union) (born 1982), Samoan rugby union player
- Chad Slade (American football) (born 1992), American football guard
