= 1933–34 French Rugby Union Championship =

- Countries: France
- Champions: Bayonne
- Runners-up: Biarritz

The 1933–34 French Rugby Union Championship 1933-34 was won by Bayonne that beat Biarritz in the final.

The tournament was played by 54 clubs divided in six pool of nine and after in two pool of three. The winner of these two pools met in the final.

== Final ==
Teams	Bayonne - Biarritz
Score	13 - 8 (0 - 5)
Date	13/5/1934
Venue	Stade des Ponts Jumeaux, Toulouse
Referee	Abel Martin
Line-up
Bayonne	Georges Haitce, Edouard Ainciart, Jean-Louis Dauga, André Chirles, Jérôme Lecha, Paul Brouznec, Jean Garin, René Arotça, Robert Cunibert, Edmond Élissalde, Armand Vigneau, Fernand Théodoly, David Zabaletta, Maurice Celhay, Albert Lespitaou
Biarritz	Pierre Moulian, Francis Daguerre, Albert Guiné, Jean-Baptiste Lefort, Etienne Ithurra, Louis Lascaray, Paul Lafourcade, Albert Portet, René Laborde, Jean Rumeau, Louis Cluchague, Robert Guilhou, Henri Haget, Pierre Cussac, Rémi Sallenave
Scorers
Bayonne	2 tries Zabaletta and Dauga; 1 penalty Elissalde; 1 drop Celhay
Biarritz	2 tries Guillou and Cussac; 1 conversion Haget
