= Jean-Jo Marmouyet =

French rugby union player

Jean Jo Marmouyet
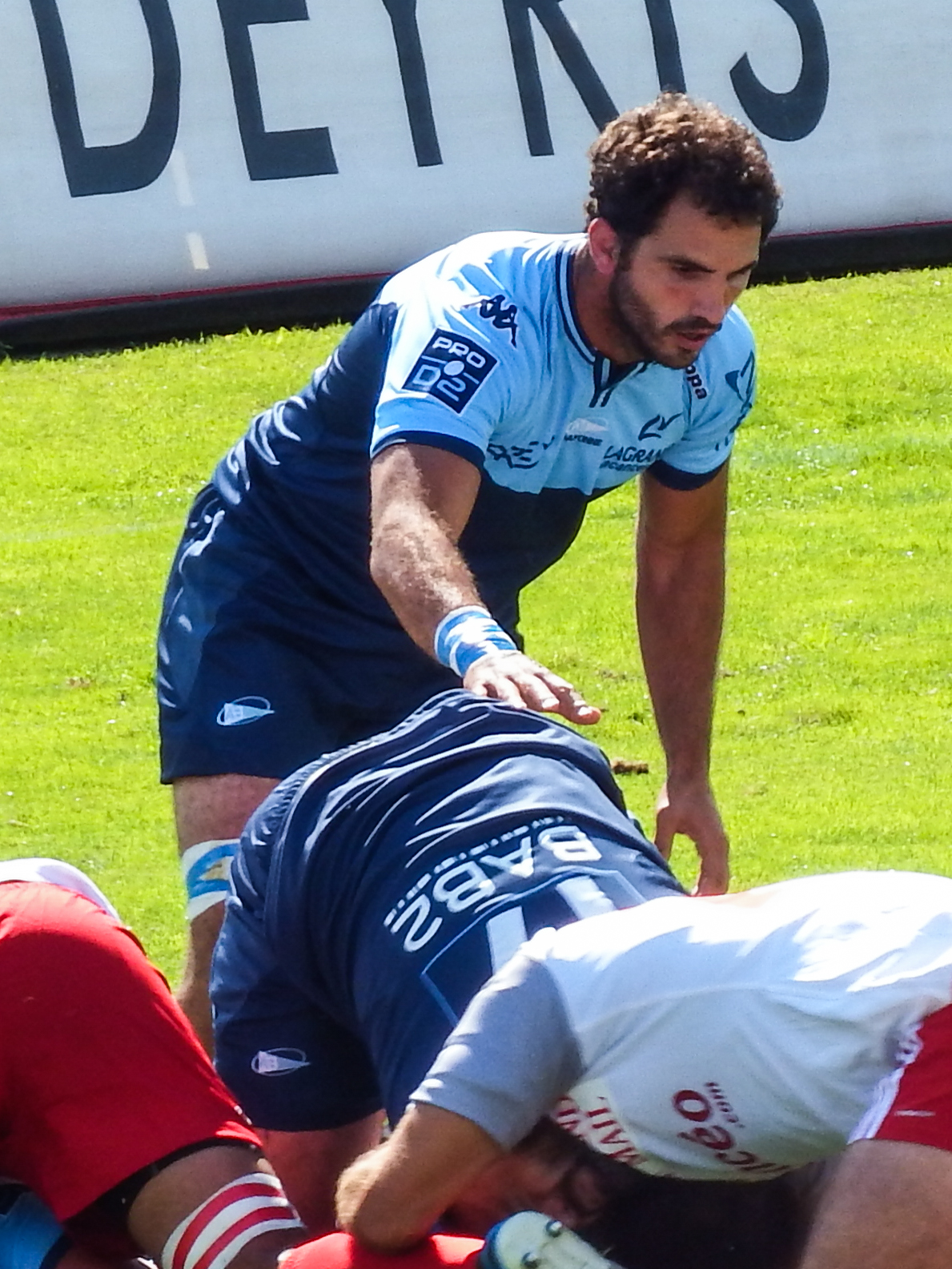
- Born: Jean Joseph Marmouyet; 9 August 1984 (age 42)
- Height: 1.93 m (6 ft 4 in)
- Weight: 96 kg (15 st 2 lb)

Rugby union career
- Position: Flanker
Senior career
Years	Team	Apps	(Points)
2006–2018	Bayonne	187	(45)
- Correct as of 1 December 2019

Jean-Jo Marmouyet (born 9 August 1984) is a French professional rugby union player. He plays at flanker for Bayonne in the Top 14.
