= Denis Avril =

France international rugby union player (born 1972)

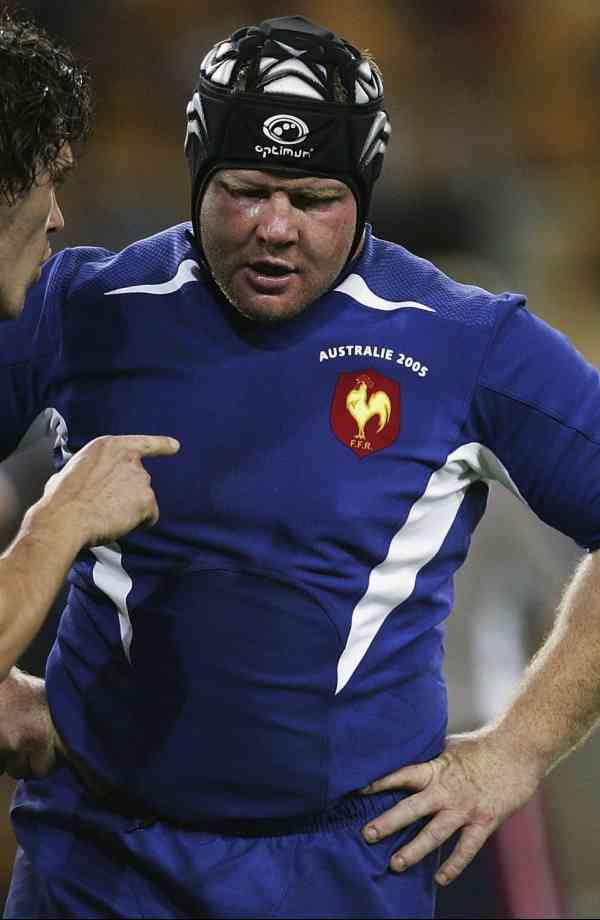
- Born: 31 October 1972 (age 54) Thouars, France
- Height: 1.77 m (5 ft 10 in)
- Weight: 108 kg (17 st 0 lb)

Rugby union career
- Position: Prop
Senior career
Years	Team	Apps	(Points)
1996-2008	Biarritz Olympique	169	(35)
2008-	Aviron Bayonnais	79	(0)
International career
Years	Team	Apps	(Points)
2005	France	1	(0)

Denis Avril (born 31 October 1972 in Thouars) is a French international professional rugby union player.

As a prop, Avril played for Biarritz Olympique with which he won three Top 14 titles. In 2008 he left Biarritz to play for Aviron Bayonnais. He earned his only cap with France on 2 July 2005 against Australia in Brisbane.
