= Aviron Bayonnais =

French rugby union club, based in Bayonne

- Full name: Aviron Bayonnais Rugby Pro
- Nickname(s): L'Aviron (The Rowing Club); Les Ciel et Blanc (The Sky Blue and Whites)
- Founded: 14 October 1906; 119 years ago
- Location: Bayonne, France
- Ground: Stade Jean-Dauger (Capacity: 14,370)
- President: Philippe Tayeb
- Coach: Grégory Patat
- Captain: Denis Marchois
- League: Top 14
- 2024–25: 4th
Team kit	2nd kit

Official website
- www.abrugby.fr

Aviron Bayonnais (AB, Basque: Baionako Arrauna), commonly called Bayonne, is a French rugby union club from Bayonne (Baiona in Basque) in Pyrénées-Atlantiques which competes in the Top 14, the top tier of the French league system. Founded in 1904, they play at the Parc des Sports, also known as Stade Jean-Dauger, in Bayonne. The club mascot is a pottok pony called pottoka. They have ties to the French Basque community.

== History ==
The club was established on 14 October 1906. They made their first final appearance in the 1913 season, when they defeated S.C.U.F. 31–8 at the Stade Yves-du-Manoir. The national domestic championship was replaced by the Coupe de l'Espérance during World War I. This competition was played for four seasons, with Aviron Bayonnais contesting the last final, which they lost to Stadoceste Tarbais 4–3.

With the French championship resumed, the club made their next championship game in the 1922 season, when they met Toulouse. Bayonne lost the final 6–0. The two teams would contest the championship final once more the next season, which Toulouse won again, 3–0.

Aviron Bayonnais enjoyed success during the mid-1930s, beating Biarritz 13–8 in Toulouse to win their second championship, their first since 1913. They also won the Challenge Yves du Manoir in 1936, defeating Perpignan in the final. The club saw similar results during the mid-1940s, with two championship final appearances, defeating SU Agen in the 1943 final at Parc des Princes in Paris and losing the 1944 season final to Perpignan.

The following decades were less successful, and the club would have to wait until the 1980s to reach another championship final. In 1980 they contested the final of the Challenge Yves du Manoir, defeating AS Béziers 16–10 to win their second title in that competition. They made it to the championship final in the 1982 season, but were defeated by SU Agen, 18–9.

Aviron Bayonnais was relegated to the Group A2 in 1996, where it spent eight seasons. Following promotion to the Top 16/14 in 2004, they remained in the top flight for 11 consecutive seasons. The team was relegated to the second level Pro D2 in 2015, and has been a yo-yo club since then. In the 2021–22 Rugby Pro D2 season, they were promoted after defeating Stade Montois 49–20 in the playoff final.

== Honours ==
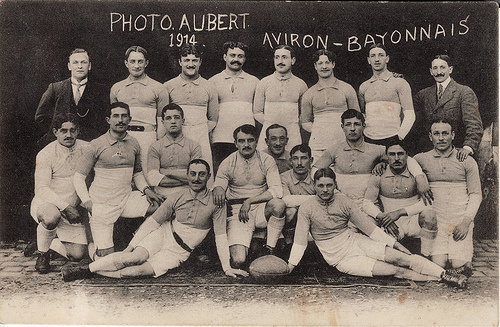
The Aviron Bayonnais squad in 1914.

- French championship Top 14
  - Champions (3): 1913, 1934, 1943
  - Runners-up (4): 1922, 1923, 1944, 1982
- Pro D2
  - Champions (2): 2019, 2022
- Challenge Yves du Manoir
  - Champions (2): 1936, 1980
- Coupe de l'Espérance
  - Runners-up: 1919

== Finals results ==
=== French championship ===
Date	Winners	Score	Runners-up	Venue	Spectators
20 April 1913	Aviron Bayonnais	31–8	S.C.U.F.	Stade Yves-du-Manoir, Colombes	20.000
23 April 1922	Stade Toulousain	6–0	Aviron Bayonnais	Route du Médoc, Le Bouscat	20.000
13 May 1923	Stade Toulousain	3–0	Aviron Bayonnais	Stade Yves-du-Manoir, Colombes	15.000
13 May 1934	Aviron Bayonnais	13–8	Biarritz Olympique	Stade des Ponts Jumeaux, Toulouse	18.000
21 March 1943	Aviron Bayonnais	3–0	SU Agen	Parc des Princes, Paris	28.000
26 March 1944	USA Perpignan	20–5	Aviron Bayonnais	Parc des Princes, Paris	35.000
29 May 1982	SU Agen	18–9	Aviron Bayonnais	Parc des Princes, Paris	41.165

=== Challenge Yves du Manoir ===
Date	Winners	Score	Runners-up
1936	Aviron Bayonnais	9–3	USA Perpignan
1980	Aviron Bayonnais	16–10	AS Béziers

=== Coupe de l'Espérance ===
Date	Winner	Score	Runner-up
1919	Stadoceste Tarbais	4–3	Aviron Bayonnais

== Current standings ==
2025–26 Top 14 Table
Pos	Team	Pld	W	D	L	PF	PA	PD	TF	TA	TB	LB	Pts	Qualification
1	Toulouse	26	18	0	8	981	617	+364	134	73	13	3	86 (Note: Toulouse received a two-point deduction due to irregularities around the transfer of their former player Melvyn Jaminet)	Qualification for playoff semi-finals and European Rugby Champions Cup
2	Montpellier	26	17	1	8	824	587	+237	101	69	8	4	82	Qualification for playoff semi-finals and European Rugby Champions Cup
3	Stade Français	26	15	1	10	869	664	+205	113	83	11	6	79	Qualification for playoff semi-final qualifiers and European Rugby Champions Cup
4	Pau	26	17	0	9	817	665	+152	98	82	7	3	78	Qualification for playoff semi-final qualifiers and European Rugby Champions Cup
5	Racing 92	26	16	1	9	828	723	+105	101	91	6	2	74	Qualification for playoff semi-final qualifiers and European Rugby Champions Cup
6	La Rochelle	26	15	0	11	824	634	+190	106	73	8	4	72	Qualification for playoff semi-final qualifiers and European Rugby Champions Cup
7	Clermont	26	15	0	11	812	708	+104	103	87	8	3	71	Qualification for European Rugby Champions Cup
8	Bordeaux Bègles	26	14	0	12	822	719	+103	113	90	8	6	70	Qualification for European Rugby Champions Cup
9	Toulon	26	12	1	13	714	820	−106	96	103	8	1	59	Qualification for European Rugby Challenge Cup
10	Castres	26	11	0	15	660	751	−91	81	96	3	8	55	Qualification for European Rugby Challenge Cup
11	Lyon	26	11	1	14	734	774	−40	92	101	3	3	52	Qualification for European Rugby Challenge Cup
12	Bayonne	26	11	0	15	747	869	−122	94	113	4	3	51	Qualification for European Rugby Challenge Cup
13	Perpignan	26	6	0	20	550	797	−247	64	99	1	4	29	Qualification for relegation play-off
14	Montauban	26	1	1	24	495	1349	−854	61	197	0	1	7	Relegation to Pro D2

Updated to match(es) played on 17 May 2026. Source: Top 14

== Current squad ==
The Bayonne squad for the 2026–27 season is:

Aviron Bayonnais 2026–27 Top 14 squad
**Props**: (France) Andy Bordelai; (Argentina) **Ignacio Calles**; (France) Pierre Castillon; (France) Swan Cormenier; (Georgia (country)) Lasha Macharashvili; (France) **Emerick Setiano**; (Fiji) **Luke Tagi**; (France) **Tevita Tatafu**; **Hookers**: (Argentina) **Facundo Bosch**; (France) **Guillaume Cramont**; (France) Lucas Martin; **Locks**: (Samoa) **Brian Alainu'uese**; (France) **Kilian Geraci**; (Scotland) **Ewan Johnson**; (Argentina) **Lucas Paulos**; (France) Matthieu Uhila	**Back row**: (Argentina) **Rodrigo Bruni**; (France) Esteban Capilla; (France) **Alexandre Fischer**; (Samoa) Giovanni Habel-Küffner; (France) Baptiste Heguy; (France) **Arthur Iturria**; (Australia) **Rob Leota**; **Scrum-halves**: (France) Léo Coly; (South Africa) **Herschel Jantjies**; (France) Baptiste Tilloles; **Fly-halves**: (South Africa) **Robert du Preez**; (France) **Joris Segonds**	**Centres**: (Fiji) **Sireli Maqala**; (France) Guillaume Martocq; (Italy) **Federico Mori**; (England) **Manu Tuilagi**; **Wings**: (Argentina) **Mateo Carreras**; (France) Arnaud Erbinartegaray; (France) Tom Leveque; (Democratic Republic of the Congo) Madosh Tambwe; (Fiji) Viliame Tutuvuli; **Fullbacks**: (France) Yohan Orabé; (France) **Tom Spring**; (France) Cheikh Tiberghien
**(c)** denotes the team captain. **Bold** denotes internationally capped players. Source:

=== Espoirs squad ===
Aviron Bayonnais 2026–27 Espoirs squad
**Props**: (France) Petti Arrossagaray; (France) Anatole Duburcq; (France) Patrice Falevalu; (Spain) Hugo Gonzalez; (France) Lucas Official; (Fiji) Emosi Tumania; (France) Nicolas Vallin; **Hookers**: (France) Iban Errecart; (France) Louka Salvi; (France) Rouane Sione; **Locks**: (Argentina) Alejandro Barrios; (France) Sohan Dealle-Facquez; (France) Hugo Leclerq; (Netherlands) Manus van Leeuwen; (Fiji) Marika Naura; (France) Ignacio Valdes-Leiva	**Back row**: (France) Ronan Caule-Duler; (France) Raphael Darquier; (France) Mahno Dealle-Facquez; (France) Juan Harinordoquy; (France) Baxine Lahitete; (France) Axel Rigaud; (Georgia (country)) Luka Shulaia; (France) Noa Traversier; **Scrum-halves**: (France) Martin Pucheu-Hauret; **Fly-halves**: (France) Xan Carricaburu; (France) Antton Idiart; (France) Diego Langlois; (France) Benat Sarraude	**Centres**: (France) Clement Bourguignon; (New Zealand) Pyrenees Boyle-Tiatia; (France) Yanis Laher; (France) Gabriel Lapegue; (France) Joseph Magne; (France) Leny Maignien; (France) Benat Sarraude; **Wings**: (France) Arthur Crepin Leblond; **Fullbacks**: (Spain) Telmo Fisher
**(c)** denotes the team captain. **Bold** denotes internationally capped players. Source:

== Notable former players ==
- (Argentina) Lisandro Arbizu
- (Argentina) Martín Bustos Moyano
- (Argentina) Matías Cortese
- (Argentina) Nicolás Fernández Miranda
- (Argentina) Santiago Fernández
- (Argentina) José María Núñez Piossek
- (Argentina) Juan Pablo Orlandi
- (Australia) Rodney Blake
- (Australia) Mark Chisholm
- (Australia) Cameron Treloar
- (Chile) Ramón Ayarza
- (England) Phil Davies
- (Fiji) Filimoni Bolavucu
- (Fiji) Gabiriele Lovobalavu
- (Fiji) Savenaca Rawaca
- (Fiji) Metuisela Talebula
- (Fiji) Saïmoni Vaka
- (France) André Alvarez
- (France) Clément Ancely
- (France) Grégory Arganese
- (France) Yoan Audrin
- (France) Julien Audy
- (France) Denis Avril
- (France) Marc Baget
- (France) Antoine Battut
- (France) Robert Baulon
- (France) André Béhotéguy
- (France) Henri Béhotéguy
- (France) Christian Bélascain
- (France) Eugène Billac
- (France) Benjamin Boyet
- (France) Renaud Boyoud
- (France) Maurice Celhay
- (France) Baptiste Chouzenoux
- (France) Jean Condom
- (France) Jean Dauger
- (France) Walter Desmaison
- (France) Pierre Dospital
- (France) Richard Dourthe
- (France) Bernard Duprat
- (France) Pépito Elhorga
- (France) Jean-Pierre Élissalde
- (France) Anthony Étrillard
- (France) Benjamin Fall
- (France) Fernand Forgues
- (France) Xavier Garbajosa
- (France) Pierre Gayraud
- (France) Jean-Michel Gonzalez
- (France) Steven Hall
- (France) Arnaud Héguy
- (France) Cédric Heymans
- (France) Yoann Huget
- (France) Aretz Iguiniz
- (France) Vincent Inigo
- (France) Jean Iraçabal
- (France) Louis Junquas
- (France) Paul Labadie
- (France) Simon Labouyrie
- (France) Thibault Lacroix
- (France) Patrice Lagisquet
- (France) Damien Lagrange
- (France) Daniel Larrechea
- (France) Grégoire Lascubé
- (France) René Lasserre
- (France) Christophe Lamaison
- (France) Camille Lopez
- (France) Christian Magnanou
- (France) Jean-Jo Marmouyet
- (France) Romain Martial
- (France) Rémy Martin
- (France) Lionel Mazars
- (France) Jean Monribot
- (France) Yannick N'Gog
- (France) Marvin O'Connor
- (France) Charles Ollivon
- (France) Clément Otazo
- (France) Laurent Pardo
- (France) Patrick Perrier
- (France) Jean-Baptiste Peyras-Loustalet
- (France) Roland Pétrissans
- (France) Lucas Pointud
- (France) Julien Puricelli
- (France) Jérôme Schuster
- (France) Scott Spedding
- (France) Jacques Rollet
- (France) David Roumieu
- (France) Benjamin Thiéry
- (France) Matthieu Ugalde
- (France) Jean-Marie Usandisaga
- (Georgia (country)) Giorgi Jgenti
- (Georgia (country)) Davit Khinchaguishvili
- (Georgia (country)) Avto Kopaliani
- (Italy) Lorenzo Cittadini
- (Italy) Craig Gower
- (Italy) Salvatore Perugini
- (Italy) Ramiro Pez
- (Japan) Wataru Murata
- (Namibia) P. J. van Lill
- (New Zealand) Stephen Brett
- (New Zealand) Tom Donnelly
- (New Zealand) Ross Filipo
- (New Zealand) Troy Flavell
- (New Zealand) Gerard Fraser
- (New Zealand) Dwayne Haare
- (New Zealand) Tanerau Latimer
- (New Zealand) Sione Lauaki
- (New Zealand) Joe Rokocoko
- (New Zealand) Blair Stewart
- (New Zealand) Neemia Tialata
- (Netherlands) Willie du Plessis
- (South Africa) Sam Gerber
- (South Africa) JC Janse van Rensburg
- (South Africa) Rassie Jansen van Vuuren
- (South Africa) Joe Pietersen
- (Russia) Viacheslav Grachev
- (Samoa) Census Johnston
- (Samoa) Leo Lafaiali'i
- (Samoa) Jeremy Tomuli
- (Scotland) Johnnie Beattie
- (Scotland) James McLaren
- (Spain) Oscar Astarloa
- (Spain) Cédric Garcia
- (Spain) Francisco Puertas Soto
- (Tonga) Edwin Maka
- (Tonga) Manu Ahotaeiloa
- (Tonga) Lisiate Faʻaoso
- (Tonga) Pila Fifita
- (Tonga) Opeti Fonua
- (Wales) Ben Broster
- (Wales) Mike Phillips

== Coaches ==
- 2008–2010 : (France) Richard Dourthe, (France) Thierry Mentières, (France) Jean-Philippe Coyola.
- 2010 : (France) Christian Gajan.
- 2010–2011 : (France) Christian Gajan, (France) Thomas Lièvremont, (France) Frédéric Tauzin.
- 2011–2012 : (France) Jean-Pierre Elissalde, (France) Didier Faugeron, (France) Pierre-Henry Broncan.
- 2012–2012 : (France) Didier Faugeron, (France) Denis Avril.
- 2012–2013 : (France) Christian Lanta, (France) Christophe Deylaud, (France) Denis Avril.
- 2013–2014 : (France) Christian Lanta, (France) Christophe Deylaud.
- 2014–2015 : (Argentina) (Australia) Patricio Noriega, (France) Nicolas Morlaes, (South Africa) Rob Linde, (France) Daniel Larrechea.
- 2015–2017 : (France) Vincent Etcheto, (South Africa) Dewald Senekal, (Italy) Simone Santa Maria.
- 2017–2018 : (France) Pierre Berbizier, (France) Joël Rey, (France) Vincent Etcheto, (Italy) Simone Santa Maria.
- 2018–2019 : (France) Yannick Bru, (France) Joël Rey, (France) Vincent Etcheto, (France) Éric Artiguste.
- 2019–2021 : (France) Yannick Bru, (France) Joël Rey, (France) Rémy Ladauge, (France) Éric Artiguste.
- 2021–2022 (France) Yannick Bru, (France) Joël Rey, (France) Éric Artiguste, (France) Jean-Frédéric Dubois.
- 2022- : (France) Grégory Patat, (France) Joël Rey, (New Zealand) Gerard Fraser, (France) Éric Artiguste.

== See also ==
- List of rugby union clubs in France
- Rugby union in France
