= Michael Stupple =

English rugby union player

(England) Michael Stupple
- Born: 16 November 1990 (age 35) Epsom, England
- Height: 1.91 m (6 ft 3 in)
- Weight: 116 kg (18 st 4 lb; 256 lb)

Rugby union career
- Position(s): Number 8, Centre
Youth career
- Wadebridge
Senior career
| Years | Team | Apps | (Points) |
| 2009-2012 | Exeter Chiefs | | |
International career
| Years | Team | Apps | (Points) |
- England U19

Michael Stupple is a Rugby Union player. He can play at either Number 8 or Centre. He made his debut for Exeter in 2009 against Doncaster.

Stupple was one of several players released from Exeter Chiefs for the 2012–13 season.
