= Dwayne Haare =

- Born: Dwayne Haare; 9 June 1980 (age 46)
- Height: 1.97 m (6 ft 6 in)
- Weight: 105 kg (16 st 7 lb)

Rugby union career
- Position: Flanker
Senior career
Years	Team	Apps	(Points)
- Randwick
2005–2007	RC Narbonne	55	(15)
2007–16	Bayonne	189	(40)
- Correct as of 1 December 2019
Super Rugby
Years	Team	Apps	(Points)
- Waratahs

Dwayne Haare (born 9 June 1980) is a New Zealand professional rugby union player. He played as flanker for Bayonne in the Top 14.
