= Marc Baget =

French professional rugby union player

- Born: 5 September 1984 (age 42) Tournay, France
- Height: 1.91 m (6 ft 3 in)
- Weight: 109 kg (17 st 2 lb)

Rugby union career
- Position: Number eight
Senior career
Years	Team	Apps	(Points)
2003-2006	Biarritz	23	(5)
2006-	Aviron Bayonnais	72	(23)

Marc Baget (born 5 September 1984 in Tournay) is a French professional rugby union player.

As a Number eight, Avril played for Biarritz Olympique where which he won two Top 14 titles. In 2008 he left Biarritz to play for Aviron Bayonnais where he became captain.
