= Matias Viazzo =

Argentine rugby union player (born 1983)

- Born: Matias Viazzo; March 6, 1983 (age 43) Argentina
- Height: 1.81 m (5 ft 11 1/2 in)
- Weight: 87 kg (192 lb; 13 st 10 lb)

Rugby union career
- Position: Wing/Centre
Senior career
Years	Team	Apps	(Points)
- Bourgoin
International career
Years	Team	Apps	(Points)
- Argentina

Matias Viazzo (born March 6, 1983) is an Argentine rugby union footballer who plays at wing and centre where he has represented the Argentina national rugby union team. He currently plays for club Bourgoin.
