= Phil Nilsen =

English rugby union player

Phil Nilsen (born 26 February 1985 (age 40) in Sale, Greater Manchester, England) is a rugby union footballer for Coventry having previous played for Leeds Carnegie. Having originally played Blindside flanker, Phil moved to Hooker under the direct advice from the now RFU coach Stuart Lancaster. Lancaster recruited Nilsen into the academy at just 17 years of age, having watched him play for the Yorkshire under-18 team. Nilsen originally hails from Sale.

When he began his career at the club he originally played at Back row, but he switched to the Front row and has not looked back since. In 2004 he was part of the National Colts Final winning team and in 2005 he helped Leeds Carnegie pick up the Yorkshire Senior Cup.

During the 2007–08 Guinness Premiership he spent time on loan at Otley, but returned to Leeds to make 5 appearances before an arm injury ruled him out of action.
