= Bernie Upton =

New Zealand rugby union player (born 1981)

- Full name: Bernard Peter Upton
- Born: 22 September 1981 (age 45) Upper Hutt, New Zealand
- Height: 6 ft 6 in (198 cm)
- Weight: 255 lb (116 kg)

Rugby union career
- Position: Lock
Provincial / State sides
Years	Team	Apps	(Points)
2003–06	Bay of Plenty	38	(0)
2007	Wellington	14	(0)
2008	North Harbour	5	(0)
2009–11	Connacht	?	(?)
Super Rugby
Years	Team	Apps	(Points)
2004–06	Chiefs	22	(5)
2007–08	Hurricanes	11	(0)

Bernard Peter Upton (born 22 September 1981) is a New Zealand former professional rugby union player.

== Rugby career ==
Born in Upper Hutt, Upton was a Wellington secondary schools and under-19s player, but began his provincial career at the Bay of Plenty. He competed for the Chiefs from 2004 to 2006, then returned to Wellington in 2007 and had two seasons with the Hurricanes. Wellington loaned Upton out to North Harbour in 2008 and the following year he headed overseas, playing two seasons at Connacht. He finished his career with Toshiba Brave Lupus in Japan.

=== International ===
Upton toured Australia with the Junior All Blacks in 2005 and was in the team that won the 2006 IRB Pacific 5 Nations.
