= Vincent Martin (rugby union) =

French rugby union player

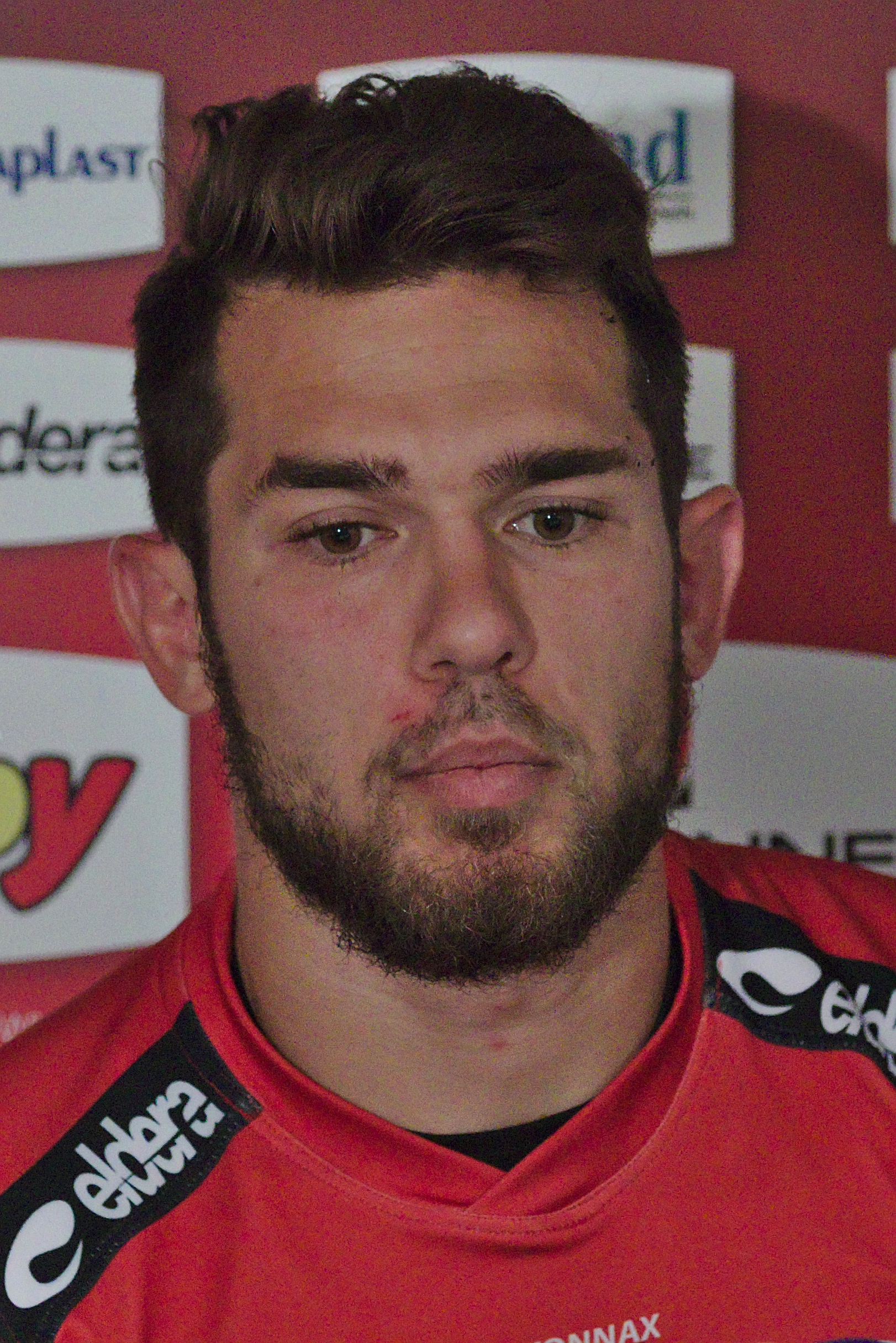
- Born: 4 September 1992 (age 34) Avignon, France
- Height: 1.85 m (6 ft 1 in)
- Weight: 89 kg (14 st 0 lb)

Rugby union career
- Position(s): Centre, Wing
Senior career
Years	Team	Apps	(Points)
2012–2014	RC Toulon	25	(10)
2014–2015	Lyon OU	4	(0)
2015–2016	Oyonnax	18	(10)
2016–	Montpellier HR	52	(35)
- Correct as of 12 sept 2016
International career
Years	Team	Apps	(Points)
2012	France U20	5	(5)

Vincent Martin (born 4 September 1992) is a French rugby union player who plays for Montpellier HR in the Top 14. His position is centre, although he can also play as a wing. In November 2012, he was named in the France 30-man squad for the 2012 autumn internationals by coach Philippe Saint-André.
