= Tommaso Iannone =

- Born: Tommaso Iannone; 16 September 1990 (age 36) Treviso, Italy
- Height: 1.81 m (5 ft 11 1/2 in)
- Weight: 77 kg (12 st 2 lb)

Rugby union career
- Position(s): Wing, Fly-half
Senior career
Years	Team	Apps	(Points)
2009–11	Crociati Parma	29	(25)
2011–13	Benetton Treviso	31	(10)
2013–15	Zebre	27	(20)
2015−19	Benetton	55	(5)
- Correct as of 12 Apr 2019
International career
Years	Team	Apps	(Points)
2009−10	Italy Under 20	18	(20)
2010−12	Emerging Italy	3	(0)
2012–14	Italy	10	(5)
- Correct as of 21 Jun 2014

Tommaso Iannone (born 16 September 1990) is a retired Italian rugby union player and he played for Zebre and Benetton in the Pro14 and the Italian national team. His position was Wing, although he can also play as a Fly-half.

He began his career with Crociati Parma before he moved to Benetton Treviso in 2011. He made his international test debut in a 28–23 win against Tonga on 10 November 2012.

In May 2013, it was announced that Tommaso Iannone was dropped from the squad and would join Zebre. Iannone returned to Benetton in 2015.
