= Maurice Celhay =

France international rugby union player

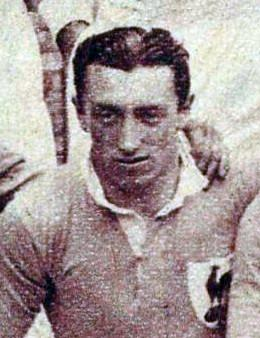
- Full name: Maurice Jean Pierre Celhay
- Born: 17 May 1911 Saint-Palais, France
- Died: 17 October 1980 (aged 69) Bayonne, France
- Height: 5 ft 8 in (173 cm)
- Weight: 163 lb (74 kg)

Rugby union career
- Position: Three–quarter
International career
Years	Team	Apps	(Points)
1935–40	France	6	(24)

Maurice Jean Pierre Celhay (17 May 1911 – 17 October 1980) was a French international rugby union player.

== Biography ==
Born in Saint-Palais, Celhay played Basque pelota in his younger years and won regional championships as a sprinter, holding the Basque provincial record for the 200 metres. He attended Lycée de Bayonne.

Celhay played rugby with Aviron Bayonnais and was a noted try scorer for the club. He also scored regularly in a limited international career, with eight tries from six appearances between 1935 and 1940, four of which came in a match against Italy.

In World War II, Celhay served with the 5th Brigade of Pyrenean Hunters.

Celhay was the owner of a bookstore and also had a newsagent's shop in Bayonne.

== See also ==
- List of France national rugby union players
