= Benjamin Dambielle =

French rugby union player

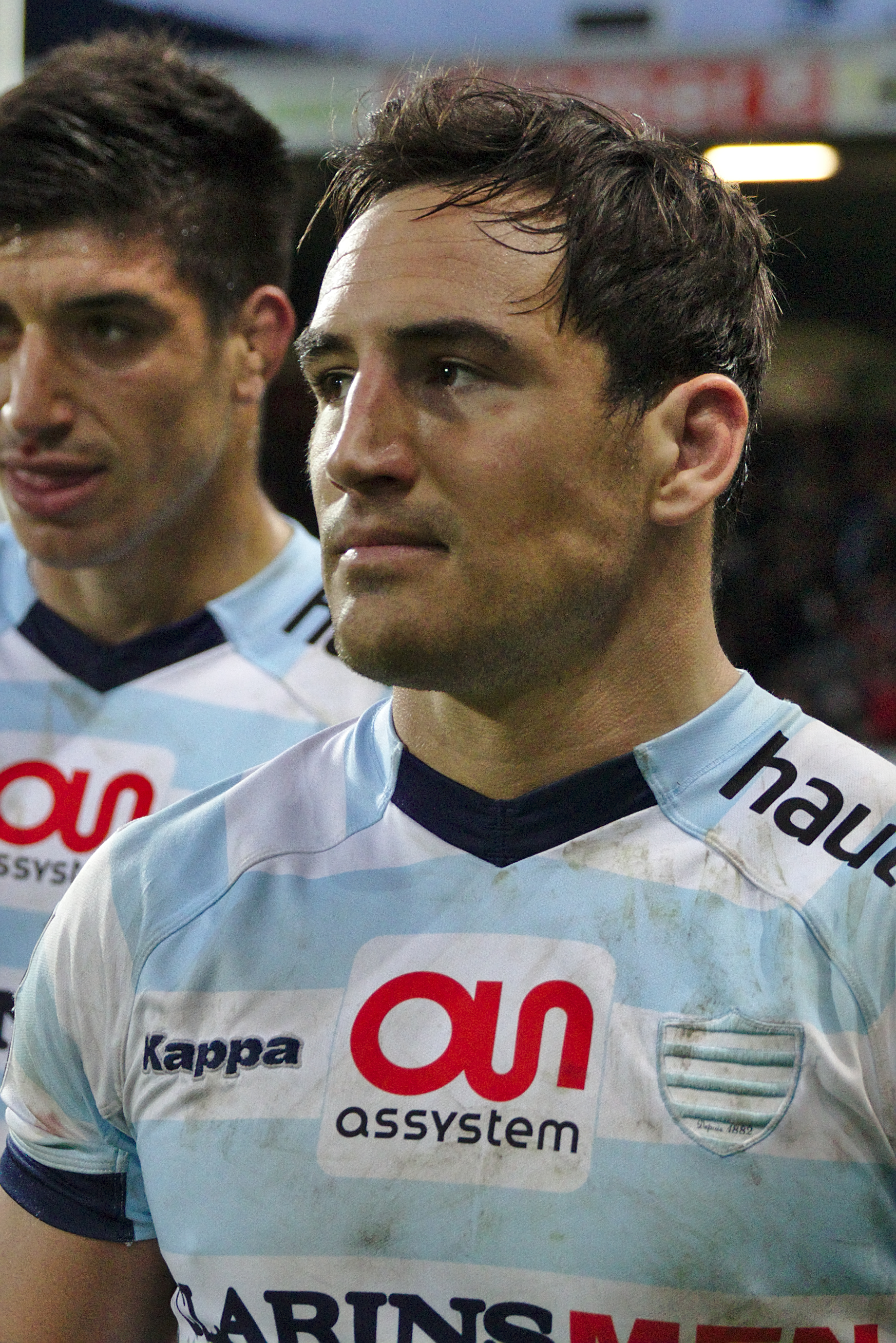
- Born: 15 July 1985 (age 41) Auch, France
- Height: 1.82 m (5 ft 11 1/2 in)
- Weight: 83 kg (13 st 1 lb)

Rugby union career
- Position: Fullback/Fly-half
Amateur team(s)
Years	Team	Apps	(Points)
1991–2004	FC Auch		
Senior career
Years	Team	Apps	(Points)
2004–2007	Biarritz Olympique	55	(51)
2007–2008	CA Brive	11	(33)
2008–2012	Stade Rochelais	81	(620)
2012–2018	Racing 92	66	(133)
- Correct as of 5 May 2018

Benjamin Dambielle (born 15 July 1985) is a French former professional rugby union player. His position was fullback. He previously played for La Rochelle, Brive and Biarritz.
