= Ian Davey =

English rugby union player (born 1986)

Ian Paul Davey
- Born: 15 November 1986 (age 39) Bristol
- Height: 1.85 m (6 ft 1 in)
- Weight: 94 kg (14 st 11 lb)
- School: Colston's Collegiate School

Rugby union career
- Position: Wing
- Current team: El Salvador
Senior career
Years	Team	Apps	(Points)
2004–2008	Bath Rugby	11	(15)
2008–2010	Bedford Blues		
2010–	El Salvador		

Ian Davey (born 15 November 1986) is a rugby union player for CR El Salvador in the Spanish División de Honor, having arrived there in 2010 after two seasons with Bedford Blues in England. He signed for Bedford in the summer of 2008 under the recommendation of former Bath player and Bedford player-coach Nick Walshe. Davey's decision to drop down a league was due to his desire to gain regular first-team rugby in order to progress his career. He Came up through the Bath Academy and made the decision to move after being with the club for nearly ten years, four of which with the Bath first team squad in the Guinness Premiership.

Davey was schooled at the Downs Preparatory School in Bristol, before moving to Queen Elizabeth's Hospital, Bristol. He then moved to Colston's Collegiate School in Bristol where he studied A-Levels. After A level, he sign his first professional contract aged 17 with Bath RFU.

Davey's normal position is as a winger, mainly due to his pace (his 100m personal best is 10.9 seconds and he used to sprint for his county), and as of February 2009 he has cemented his reputation as a very accomplished finisher by being joint top scorer in National League One with 15 tries. With experience playing at full back within Spain, Davey is an experienced back three player earning the nickname 'Wavey Davey' through his time at Bath Rugby and Bedford Blues.

Davey has represented England at Under-16, Under-18 and Under-19 level
