= David Roumieu =

French rugby player

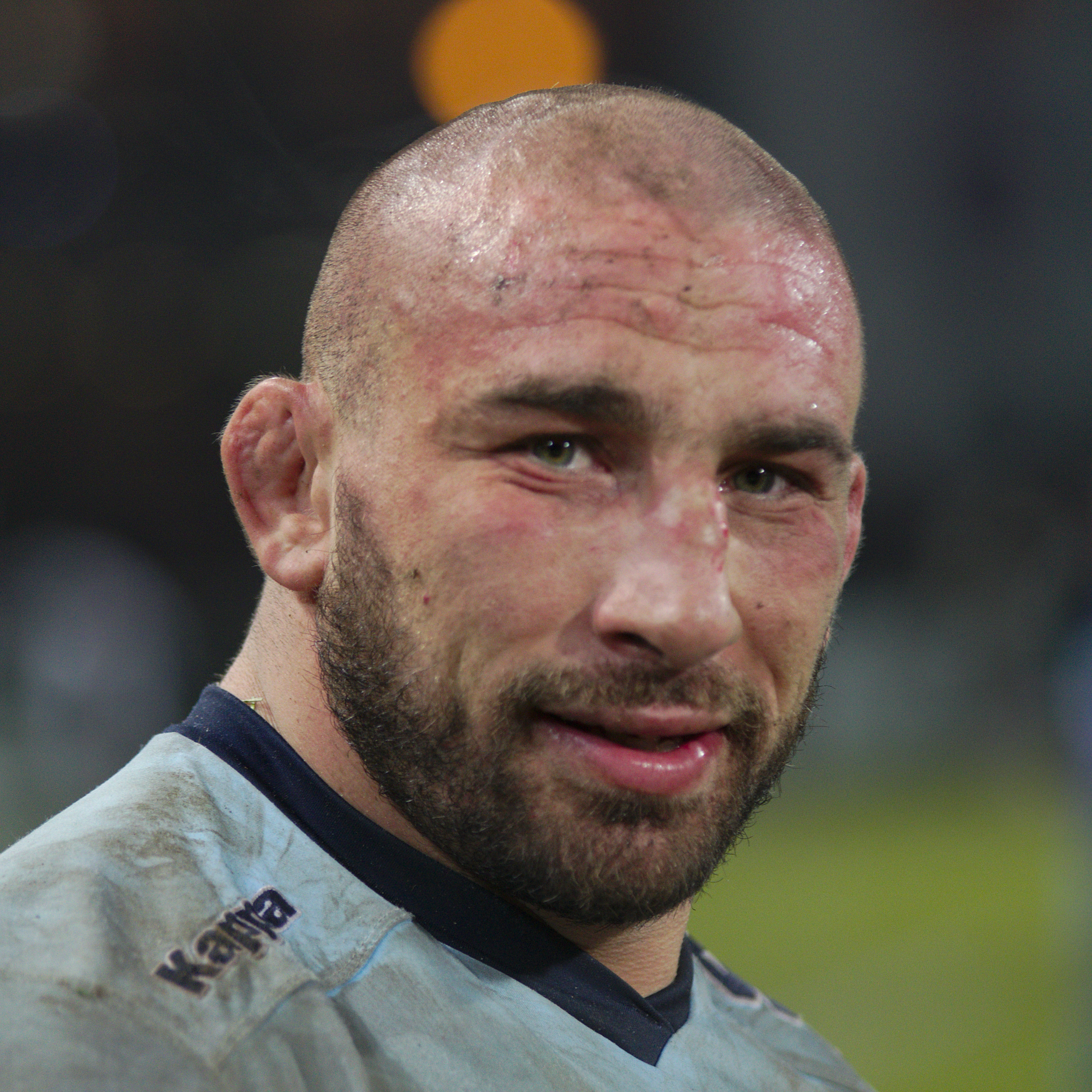
- Born: David Roumieu; 15 October 1981 (age 45) Toulouse, France
- Height: 1.74 m (5 ft 8 1/2 in)
- Weight: 99 kg (15 st 8 lb; 218 lb)

Rugby union career
- Position: Hooker
Senior career
Years	Team	Apps	(Points)
2002–2004	Montauban	20	(5)
2005–2007	Castres	45	(10)
2007–2015	Bayonne	219	(95)
2015–2016	La Rochelle	8	(5)
2016–2017	Biarritz	27	(0)
2017–2018	Toulouse	19	(5)

David Roumieu (born 15 October 1981) is a retired French professional rugby union player. He played as a hooker.
