= Ryan Davis (rugby union) =

- Born: Ryan Raymond William Davis; 11 November 1985 (age 41) Bristol, England
- Height: 1.79 m (5 ft 10 in)
- Weight: 88 kg (13 st 12 lb; 194 lb)
- School: Colston's Collegiate School
- University: Northumbria University

Rugby union career
- Position(s): Fly half, Centre
- Current team: Retired
Youth career
- Cleve RFC
Senior career
Years	Team	Apps	(Points)
2004–2010	Bath Rugby	56	(150)
2010–2011	Exeter Chiefs	9	(71)
2011–2012	London Wasps	7	(35)
2012	London Welsh	1	(0)
International career
Years	Team	Apps	(Points)
- England U16
–	England U18		
–	England U19		
–	England U21		
National sevens team
Years	Team		Comps
- England

Ryan Davis (born 11 November 1985, in England) is a rugby union player. Davis is a former England Under-16, Under-18 and Under-21 international, Davis captained his country at Under-21 level in the 2005 Six Nations and went on to play at the IRB Under-21 World Championship in France.

In 2006 Davis injured both knees, rupturing his ACL three times consecutively, reducing his time on pitch to a handful of games. After visiting the renowned Bill Knowles in North America, he made his comeback in 2010 representing Bath Rugby in every league fixture that year. Because of a succession of injuries – affecting his knee ligaments, Davis' premiership career was severely disrupted. Davis′ position of choice is as a Fly-half, but he can operate at Fullback or in the centres.

== Coaching career ==
In 2014 Ryan Davis started his coaching career at Cleve RFC as Head Coach, Colstons Collegiate as 1st XV coach and Bath Academy as an assistant EPDG coach.

In his first appointment at Cleve RFC he gained promotion from South West 1 to National 3 in 2015, only losing 4 matches in 22 league games.

2017/18 Ryan was named head coach of Beechen Cliff and Bath Rugby 18's leading them to a RFU AASE final against Hartpury College and playoff against Wasps in the RFU Academy League.

He's currently a transition and skills coach for Bath Rugby 1st XV.
