= Saïmoni Vaka =

Fijian rugby union player (born 1987)

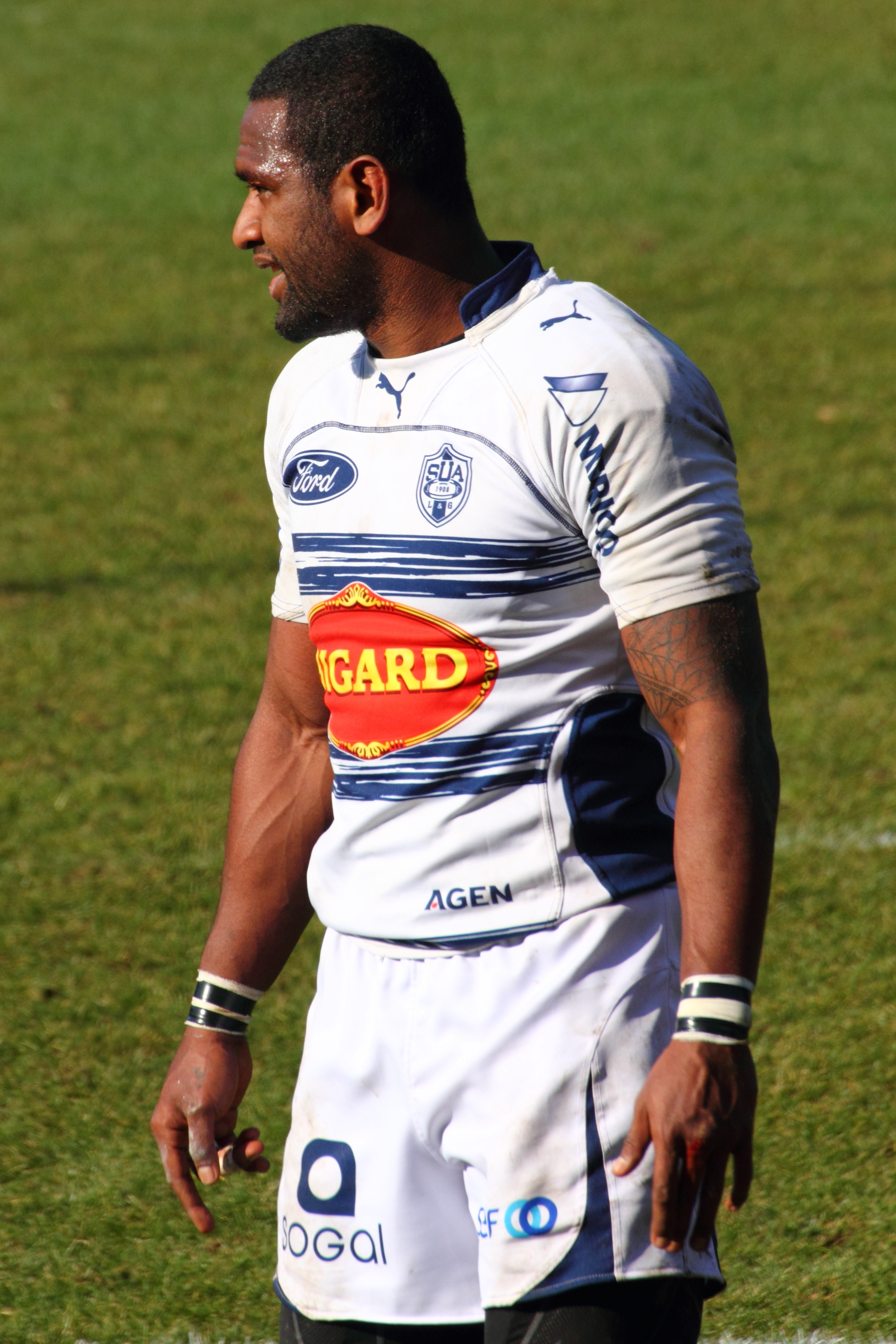
- Born: Saïmoni Vaka; 2 June 1987 (age 39) Fiji
- Height: 1.83 m (6 ft 0 in)
- Weight: 92 kg (14 st 7 lb; 203 lb)

Rugby union career
- Position: Wing
- Current team: Biarritz Olympique
Senior career
Years	Team	Apps	(Points)
2007–2013	Agen	101	(185)
2013–2015	Bayonne	11	(5)
2016–	Biarritz Olympique	13	(5)
- Correct as of 26 February 2017

Saïmoni Vaka (born 2 June 1987) is a Fijian rugby union player. His position is wing and he plays for Biarritz Olympique in the Rugby Pro D2.

He began his career in Fiji before moving to SU Agen in 2007.

He joined Bayonne in 2013.

== Honours ==
- Pro D2 Champion – 2009–10
