= Yohan Montès =

French rugby union player

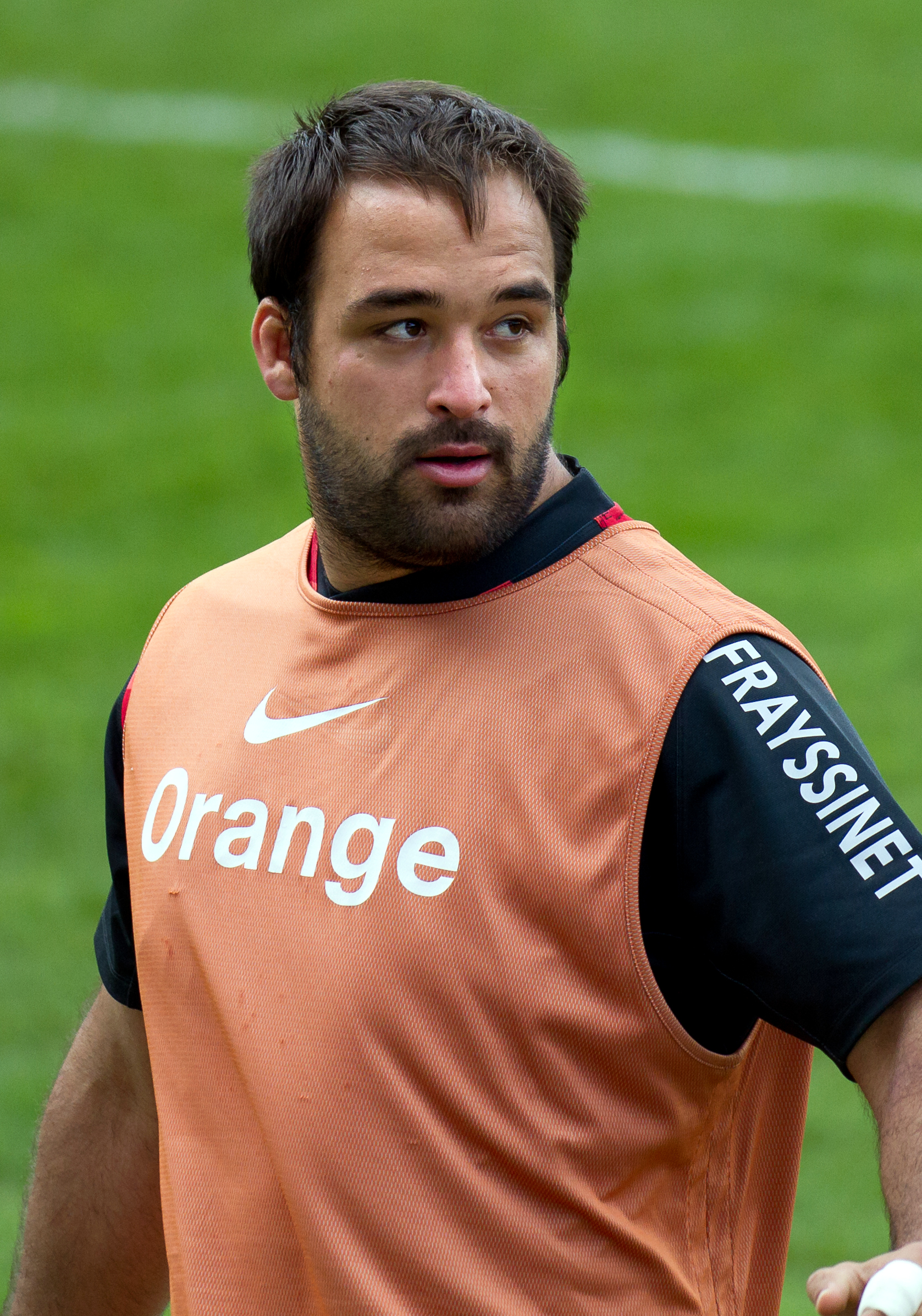
- Born: 7 February 1985 (age 41) Beauvais, France
- Height: 1.87 m (6 ft 1 1/2 in)
- Weight: 118 kg (18 st 8 lb)

Rugby union career
- Position: Prop
- Current team: Beauvais rugby
Senior career
Years	Team	Apps	(Points)
2004–2007	Stade Français	38	(20)
2007–2014	Toulouse	155	(25)
2014–2018	Castres	62	(0)
2018–2019	Agen	12	(5)
2019-2021	Provence Rugby	26	(0)
2021-	Beauvais rugby	20	(5)
- Correct as of 29 December 2018
International career
Years	Team	Apps	(Points)
2006	France U21	5	(10)
2009	France A	2	(0)

Yohan Montès (born 7 February 1985) is a former French rugby union player who played as a Prop.

== Career ==
Montès began his career with Stade Français before moving to Stade Toulousain in 2007. He finished his career playing in Fédérale 1, the third tier of French rugby, for home town club Beauvais. Montès is now their Coach.

== Barbarians ==
In March 2009, he was invited to play for the French Barbarians against the President's XV, a selection of foreign players playing in France, at the Ernest-Wallon stadium in Toulouse. The Baa-Baas lost 26 to 333. In November 2012, he played with the French Barbarians against Japan at the Océane stadium in Le Havre4. The Baa-Baas won 65 to 41. In November 2014, he was again selected to the French Barbarians team to face Namibia at the Mayol stadium in Toulon5. The Baa-Baas won 35-14.

== Honours ==
- Top 14 Champion: 2006–07, 2010–11, 2011–12
- Heineken Cup Champion: 2009–10
