= Chris Brightwell =

- Born: Chris Brightwell; 3 December 1984 (age 41) Lower Hutt, New Zealand
- Height: 1.9 m (6 ft 3 in)
- Weight: 107 kg (236 lb)
- Occupation: Professional rugby union footballer

Rugby union career
- Position(s): Back Row (Typically Number 8)
Amateur team(s)
Years	Team	Apps	(Points)
- Hawkes Bay
–	Poneke Premiers		
–	Wellington Development		
Senior career
Years	Team	Apps	(Points)
2008–2010	Birmingham and Solihull		
2008	Leicester Lions (loan)		
2009–2010	Bedford Blues		
2010–2011	Sale Sharks	13	(10)
2013 -	Birmingham Moseley Rugby Club		
International career
Years	Team	Apps	(Points)
2009–	England Sevens		

Chris Brightwell is a New Zealand-born rugby union player currently playing for England Sevens. Brightwell appeared for Hawkes Bay, Poneke Premiers and Wellington Development in his home country before moving to Birmingham and Solihull in 2008.

He then signed for Bedford Blues in 2009, before completing a transfer to Premiership side Sale Sharks. During his time at Birmingham and Solihull and Bedford Blues he also competed for England in the IRB World Sevens Series.

Chris was released from Sale at the end of the 2010–2011 season, however was recalled by Ben Ryan to the national sevens side to compete in the inaugural European Sevens Grand Prix during the summer of 2011. In August 2011 he re-signed for Birmingham and Solihull. In June 2013 he joined Moseley.

It was announced on 26 April 2016 by the club that Chris would remain as Captain of Birmingham Moseley Rugby Club for their 2016/17 campaign in National League 1 along with Director of Rugby Kevin Maggs.
