= Éric Artiguste =

French rugby union player (born 1970)

- Born: 16 July 1970 (age 56) Lourdes, France
- Height: 5 ft 10 in (178 cm)
- Weight: 182 lb (83 kg)

Rugby union career
- Position: Centre
International career
Years	Team	Apps	(Points)
1999	France	1	(5)

Éric Artiguste (born 16 July 1970) is a French former professional rugby union player.

Artiguste, a centre, was born in the town of Lourdes and came through the junior system at FC Lourdes. He won two national championships with Stade Toulousain, as well as a Heineken Cup title in 1996. While at his next club Castres Olympique, he earned a call up for France's 1999 tour of Oceania and gained his only international cap in a Test against Samoa in Apia, scoring a second half try. He retired from rugby union in 2007.

== See also ==
- List of France national rugby union players
