= Jaime Nava =

Spanish rugby union player (born 1983)

- Born: Jaime Nava de Olano; 1 May 1983 (age 43) Madrid, Spain
- Height: 1.91 m (6 ft 3 in)
- Weight: 108 kg (238 lb; 17 st 0 lb)

Rugby union career
- Position: Centre
Senior career
Years	Team	Apps	(Points)
2002–2003	Moraleja Alcobendas Rugby Union		
2003–2008	Alcobendas Rugby		
2008–2009	CR El Salvador		
2009–2010	Plymouth Albion RFC		
2010–2011	CR El Salvador		
2011–2012	CA Saint-Étienne		
2012–2014	Union Sportive Bressane		
2014–2016	CA Périgueux		
2016–2017	Stade Dijonnais Côte D'Or		
2017–2019	Alcobendas Rugby		
2019–2022	CR Alcalá		
2022-2023	Alcobendas Rugby		
International career
Years	Team	Apps	(Points)
2002–2018	Spain	79	(69)

Jaime Nava de Olano (born in Madrid, 1 May 1983) is a Spanish retired rugby union player. He was a Spanish rugby union (FER) and sevens international. In addition to being frequently called up for Spain, he was also captain; with 79 caps, he is the second player with most international caps for his country. Currently he collaborates with FER as rugby ambassador for Spain. Furthermore, in the later years he was known publicly after his stint on the RTVE cooking show MasterChef Celebrity and for his role as secondary actor in the series La Unidad, aired by Movistar+. In October 2020 he published his first book TEAM! Lecciones y valores del rugby para la vida (Diëresis).

== First years ==
Formed in the feeder team of the defunct club Moraleja Alcobendas Rugby Unión, he competed in said club in the junior categories, until in the 2001–02 season he passed to the club's first-grade team, by the hand of the then-club coach Santiago Santos, who offered the chance to Nava to sign his first semi-professional contract which was considered as the first rugby professional project in Spain. It is also then that Nava made a change in his sports projection switching from his usual flanker position, under which he developed himself during his junior years, to the one of centre in the three-quarters line. In the same season, in 2002, after various apparitions with the first-grade team, which later would become league champion, and after his participation at the Under-19 World Cup in Treviso, he was called up to play for the Spain national team which faced the Netherlands in the latest round of the Rugby Europe International Championships. In the 2002–03 season, Moraleja Alcobendas Rugby Unión folded due to economic problems, passing the torch and the club's base to the current Club Alcobendas Rugby. Nava would make that club his home during other four seasons in the top-level Spanish rugby. At this stage Nava still formed himself as player and started his university studies in Sports' physical activities sciences at Facultad de Ciencias de la Actividad Física y del Deporte.

== Overseas experiences ==
During his last season for Alcobendas, 2007–08, Nava was invited to make a series of trials in England to join the rugby league team Wigan Warriors of Super League. It is during this Trials phase when Nava was invited to play for Waterloo R.F.C. in a test against Cambridge in the National Division 2 alongside fellow Spanish international Pablo Feijoo, both being starting players in this match. Finally and after this period Nava decided to decline an offer to form in rugby league for Wigan and keep his career in Spain. In that moment, he signed for Cetransa El Salvador, from Valladolid, then-league and cup champion. It was the 2008–09 season where the Valladolid side represented Spanish rugby at the Amlin Challenge Cup giving the team equipo a more worthy role in said competition. In August 2009, it was confirmed that Nava abandoned El Salvador to join Plymouth Albion RFC, where after convincing the coaching staff, he signed a contract of several years for the club. However, an injury did not allowed him to enjoy the desired minutes and in January 2010, Nava returned again to Madrid to end the season with his club Alcobendas and to bring it the much-desired promotion to División de Honor. In the 2010–11 Nava returned to Valladolid for a second phase for El Salvador where he would end with a cup title in a derby against the club's historical rival, VRAC. After the 2010–11 season, Nava went to France in the 2011–12 season to play for CA Saint-Étienne. After a year there, Nava joined Union Sportive Bressane, proclaiming himself champion of the champion of the Jean Prat Trophy at Stade de Gerland of Lyon against CSBJ on 6 June 2013. In the summer of 2014 Nava signed for CA Périgueux, in Federale 1. After his stint for Stade Dijonnais Côte D'Or in 2016, he returned to Club Alcobendas Rugby in 2017, where two years later, he retired from professional sports. Afterwards, he played for CR Alcalá at an amateur level and in the 2022-2023 season he signed for his first club, Alcobendas Rugby, where he retired at the end of the season.

== International level ==
He was an international at under-19, disputing two Under-19 World Cups—in Chile 2001 and Italy 2002, and under-20 level. Nava debuted for Spain on 6 April 2002 at age 18 and since then he was most present in the national team, with 79 international caps. He was also a rugby sevens veteran, taking part in various European series and championships.

== Honours ==
- League champion for Moraleja Alcobendas Rugby Unión. Season 2001–02.
- University champion for Universidad Politécnica de Madrid. 2004 and 2005.
- Spanish champion for Community of Madrid. 2007 and 2012.
- League champion in División de Honor B for Club Alcobendas Rugby. Season 2009–10.
- Copa del Rey de Rugby champion for Club de Rugby El Salvador, 2011.
- Third place at the Sevens Grand Prix Series. 2011.
- Second place at the Rugby Europe International Championships. 2012.
- Fédérale 1 champion. Jean Prat Trophy. 2013.

== Trivia ==
- Featured character of the town of Ezcaray, La Rioja.
- Best sportsman from the Community of Madrid in the rugby category, seasons 2004–05 and 2005–06.
- Took part on the cooking talent show MasterChef Celebrity 3, aired on La 1 in 2018, ending out in the fifth gala.
- Co-founder of all&go, a sports marketing company whose goal is to create links between people and companies through rugby values.
- He also was an actor with secondary roles in the series La unidad and Money Heist.
