= Julien Puricelli =

France international rugby union player

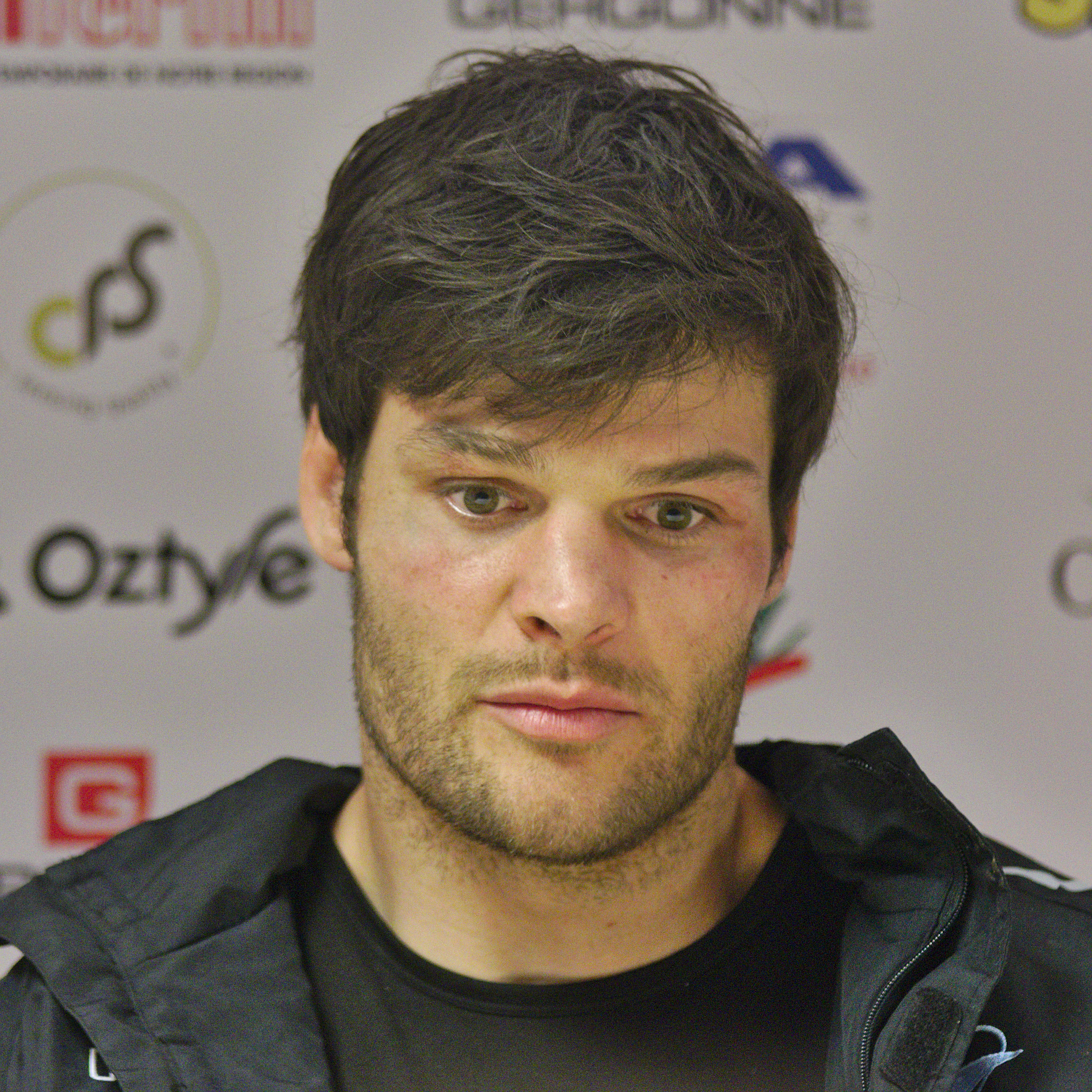
- Born: 1 August 1981 (age 45) Grenoble, France
- Height: 1.96 m (6 ft 5 in)
- Weight: 109 kg (240 lb)

Rugby union career
- Position: Flanker
- Current team: Bayonne
Senior career
Years	Team	Apps	(Points)
2003-2005	Grenoble	22	(0)
2005-2008	Castres	46	(5)
2008-2014	Bayonne	132	(35)
2014-	Lyon		
- Correct as of 1 March 2010
International career
Years	Team	Apps	(Points)
2009-	France	4	(0)
- Correct as of 1 March 2010

Julien Puricelli (born 1 August 1981) is a French rugby union player. Puricelli, who is a flanker, plays his club rugby for Lyon in the Top 14 following a spell at Bayonne. He made his debut for France against New Zealand on 13 June 2009.
