= Jean Monribot =

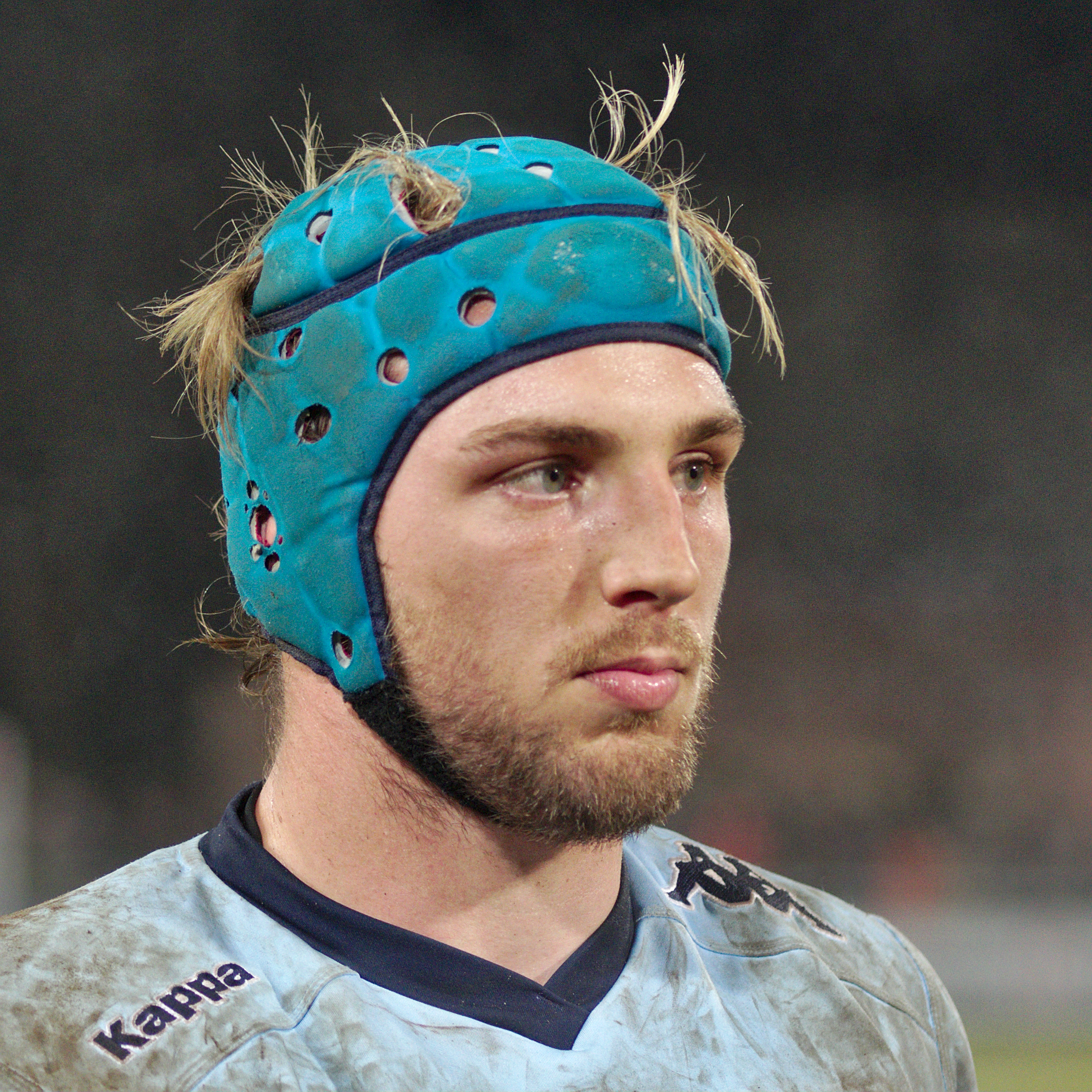
- Born: 11 October 1987 (age 39) France
- Height: 1.83 m (6 ft 0 in)
- Weight: 91 kg (14 st 5 lb)

Rugby union career
- Position: Flanker
Senior career
Years	Team	Apps	(Points)
2006–2013	Agen	142	(95)
2013–2017	Bayonne	88	(60)
2017–2019	Toulon	29	(5)
2019–	Bayonne	31	(10)
- Correct as of 1 December 2019

Jean Monribot (born 11 October 1987) is a French rugby union player. His position is flanker and he currently plays for Aviron Bayonnais in the Top 14.
