= Fernand Forgues =

French rugby union footballer and rower

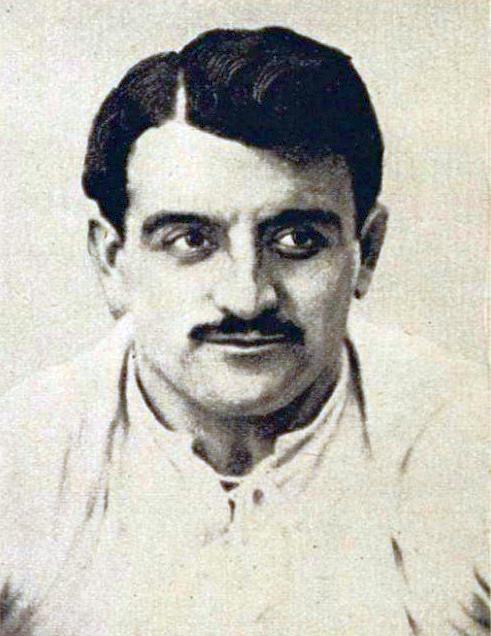
Fernand Forgues in 1923.jpg

Fernand Forgues (1884–1973) was a French rower and rugby union player.
