= Laurent Sempéré =

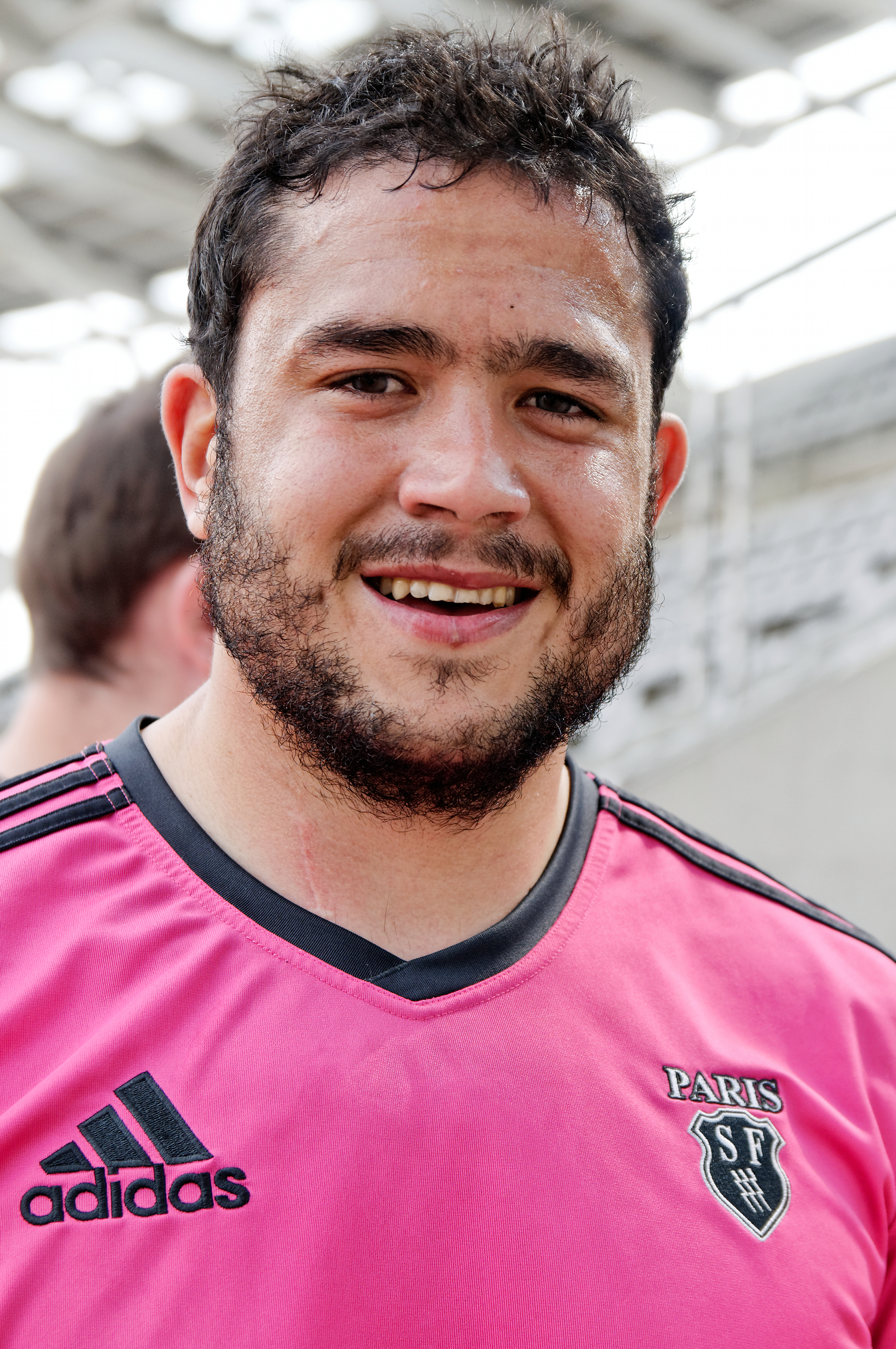
- Born: 6 July 1985 (age 41) Perpignan, France
- Height: 1.80 m (5 ft 11 in)
- Weight: 98 kg (15 st 6 lb)

Rugby union career
Senior career
Years	Team	Apps	(Points)
2004–2006	Perpignan	7	(5)
2006–2008	Racing Métro	39	(10)
2008–2019	Stade Francais	204	(35)
Coaching career
- Years: Team
- 2019–2023: Stade Français (forwards)
- 2023–: France (forwards)

Laurent Sempéré (born 9 July 1985) is a French rugby union coach and former player, he is currently the forwards coach of the France national team. His position was Hooker. He began his career with USA Perpignan before moving to Racing Métro 92 in 2006. He then moved across Paris to Stade Français in 2008.
