= Cédric Garcia =

Spain international rugby union player (b.1982)

- Born: Cédric Garcia; 28 December 1982 (age 43) Toulouse, France
- Height: 5 ft 7 in (1.70 m)
- Weight: 10.43 st (66.2 kg; 146.0 lb)

Rugby union career
- Position: Scrum-half
- Current team: Castres Olympique
Senior career
Years	Team	Apps	(Points)
2001–2008	Montauban	103	(32)
2008–2013	Bayonne	132	(468)
2013–2015	Castres	34	(19)
- Correct as of 7 February 2022
International career
Years	Team	Apps	(Points)
2004	Spain	3	(0)
- Correct as of 12 January 2014

Cédric Garcia (born 28 December 1982 in Toulouse, Haute-Garonne, France ) is a French-Spanish rugby union player. He played for Castres Olympique, Bayonne and US Montauban. Garcia, a scrum-half, also played three games for the Spanish national team in 2004.
