= Quentin Valançon =

French rugby union player (born 1989)

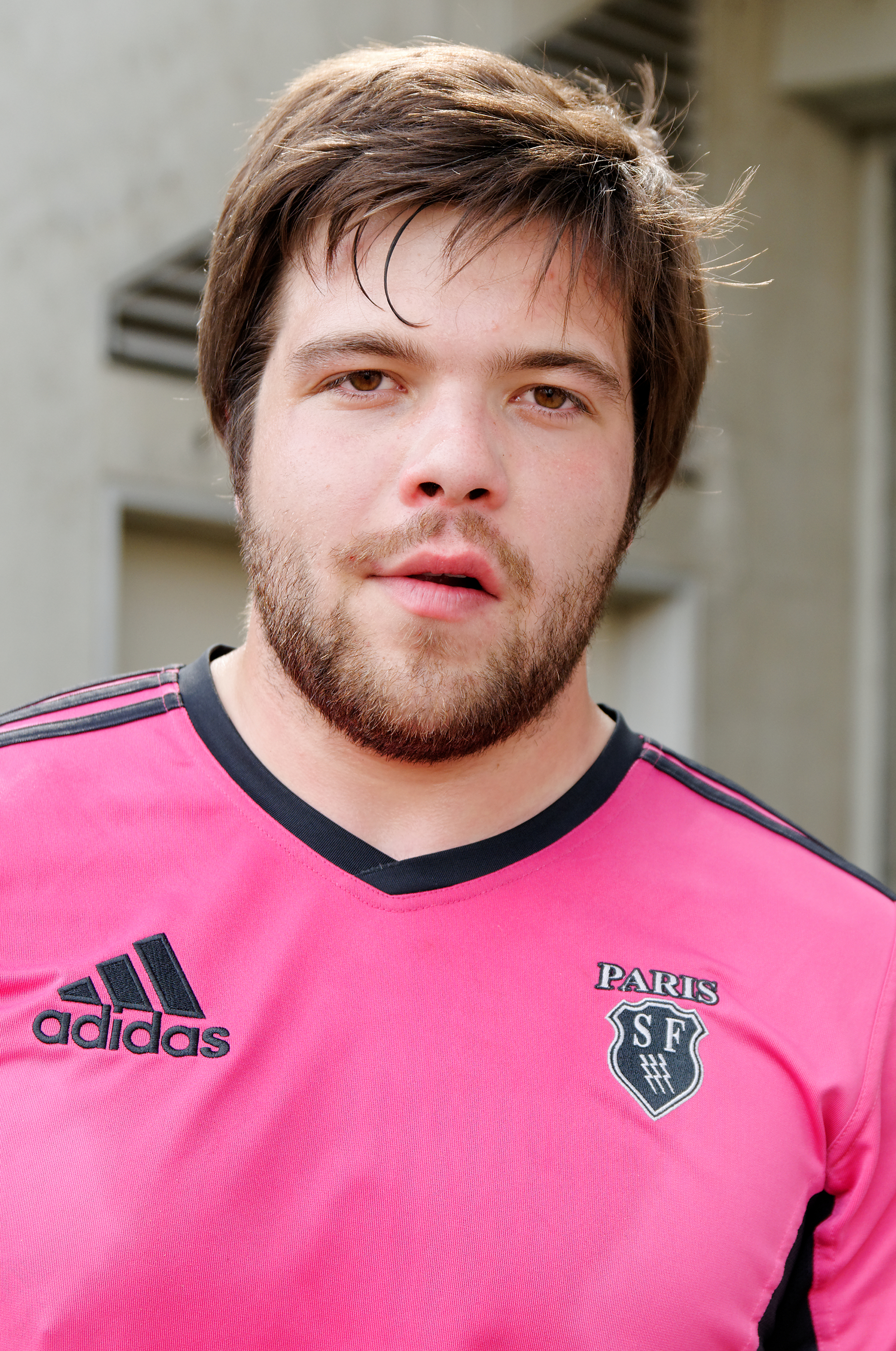
- Born: 31 March 1989 (age 37) Les Lilas, France
- Height: 1.83 m (6 ft 0 in)
- Weight: 94 kg (14 st 11 lb)

Rugby union career
- Position(s): Centre, Wing
Senior career
Years	Team	Apps	(Points)
2007–2009	Stade Français	1	(0)
2009–2010	Bordeaux Bègles	18	(0)
2010–2012	Stade Français	10	(20)
2012–	Section Paloise	6	(0)
- Correct as of 19 November 2012

Quentin Valançon (born 31 March 1989) is a French rugby union player. His position is Centre and he currently plays for Section Paloise (Pau) in the Rugby Pro D2. He began his career with Stade Français, spent a year at Bordeaux Bègles before returning to Paris. He moved to Pau in 2012.
