= Hoani Tui =

New Zealand rugby union player

- Born: 29 May 1984 (age 42) Whanganui, New Zealand
- Height: 1.82 m (5 ft 11 1/2 in)
- Weight: 118 kg (18 st 8 lb)

Rugby union career
- Position: Prop
Senior career
Years	Team	Apps	(Points)
2008-2009	Calvisano	22	(0)
2009-2014	Exeter Chiefs	96	(15)
2014-16	Lyon	29	(0)
Provincial / State sides
Years	Team	Apps	(Points)
2007-2008	Wellington	6	(0)
International career
Years	Team	Apps	(Points)
2007	New Zealand Maori	3	(0)

Hoani Tui (born 29 May 1984) is a New Zealand rugby union player. He currently plays for Oyonnax in the Pro D2. His position of choice is prop.

When playing for Wellington, Hoani was called up to represent the New Zealand Māori side in the 2007 Churchill Cup. Tui signed for the Italian side Calvisano in 2008, Tui then joined the Exeter Chiefs for the 2009/2010 season.

Having made a total of 120 appearances for Exeter, it was announced on 8 January 2013 that Tui had signed for Lyon.
