= Thomas Combezou =

French rugby union player

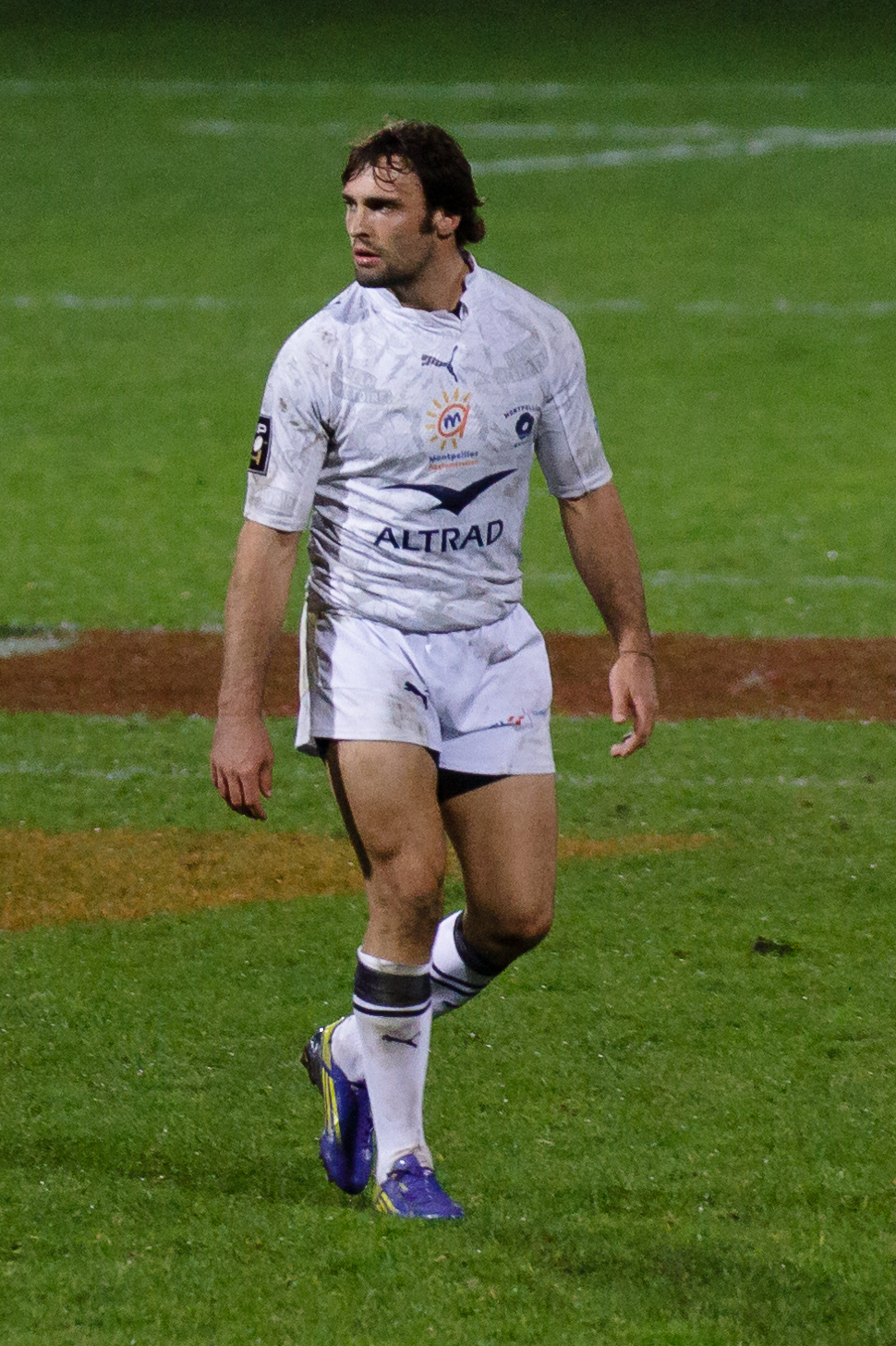
- Born: 26 January 1987 (age 39) Tulle, France
- Height: 1.82 m (5 ft 11 1/2 in)
- Weight: 94 kg (14 st 11 lb)

Rugby union career
- Position(s): Centre, Wing
Senior career
| Years | Team | Apps | (Points) |
| 2006–2009 | Clermont | 15 | (10) |
| 2009–2011 | La Rochelle | 56 | (65) |
| 2011–2014 | Montpellier | 74 | (40) |
| 2014– | Castres | 208 | (230) |
- Correct as of 24 June 2020

Thomas Combezou (born 26 January 1987) is a French rugby union player. His position is Centre and he currently plays for Castres in France's top division of rugby union, the Top 14. He began his career with Clermont Auvergne before moving to La Rochelle in 2009. He transferred to Montpellier after La Rochelle's relegation in 2011, and then moved to Castres following the 2013–14 season.

== Honours ==
=== Club ===
(France) Castres

- Top 14: 2017–18
