= Chad Slade (rugby union) =

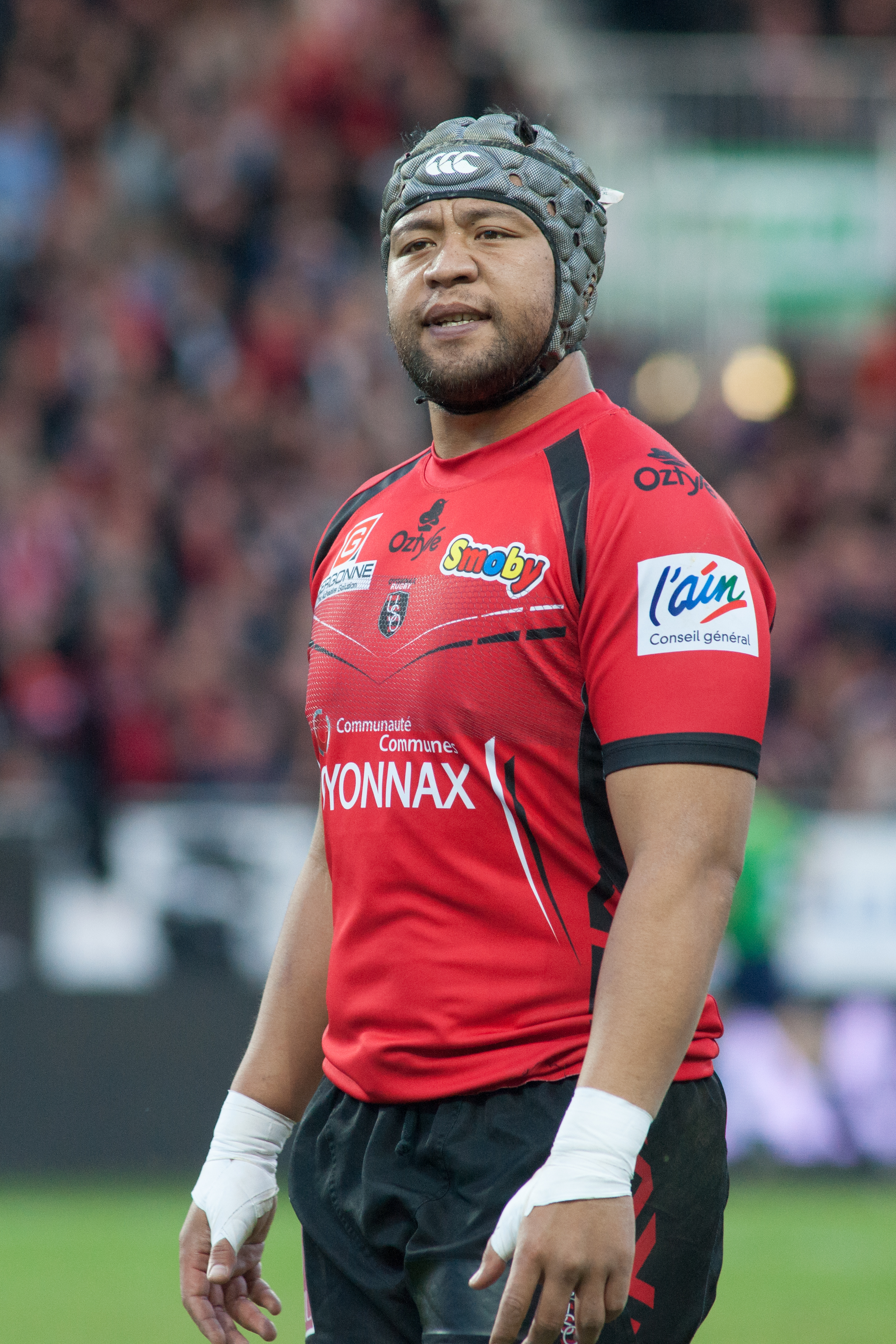
- Born: 8 January 1982 (age 44) Apia, Samoa
- Height: 1.96 m (6 ft 5 in)
- Weight: 115 kg (18 st 2 lb)
- School: St Joseph's College, Samoa.

Rugby union career
- Position: Number 8
- Current team: USBPA Rugby
Senior career
Years	Team	Apps	(Points)
- Grammar Carlton
2006–2012	Exeter Chiefs	20	(0)
2012–	Oyonnax Rugby		
International career
Years	Team	Apps	(Points)
2006–2008	Samoa	6	(0)

Fred Sioa Chad Slade (born 8 January 1982) is a rugby union player for Oyonnax Rugby in the Top 14.
