= Kenan Mutapcic =

- Born: Kenan Mutapčić; November 6, 1979 (age 47) Zenica, SR Bosnia and Herzegovina, SFR Yugoslavia
- Height: 1.8 m (5 ft 11 in)
- Weight: 114 kg (251 lb; 18.0 st)

Rugby union career
- Position: Prop
Senior career
Years	Team	Apps	(Points)
- US Bressane
–	FC Grenoble		
International career
Years	Team	Apps	(Points)
- Bosnia and Herzegovina

Kenan Mutapčić (born 6 November 1979) is a Bosnian rugby union football player based in France. He plays as a prop.

Mutapčić was attached to US Bressane but switched to Grenoble in the French Rugby Pro D2 division during the 2009-10 season.

He plays for Bosnia and Herzegovina.
