= 2011–12 Heineken Cup pool stage =

- Season: 2011–12 Heineken Cup
- Date: 11 November 2011 - 22 January 2012

Qualifiers
- Seed 1: (Ireland) Munster
- Seed 2: (Ireland) Leinster
- Seed 3: (Scotland) Edinburgh
- Seed 4: (England) Saracens
- Seed 5: (France) Clermont Auvergne
- Seed 6: (France) Toulouse
- Seed 7: (Wales) Cardiff Blues
- Seed 8: (Ireland) Ulster

The 2011–12 Heineken Cup pool stage was the first stage of the 17th season of the Heineken Cup, Europe's top competition for rugby union clubs. It involved 24 teams competing for eight quarter-final berths, awarded to the winners of each of six pools plus the two top-ranked second-place teams. The nest three best runners-up were parachuted into the Amlin Challenge Cup.

The pool stage began with two matches on the evening of 11 November 2011, and ended on Sunday 22 January 2012. The quarter-finalists then participates in a knockout tournament that ultimately ended with the final on Saturday 19 May at Twickenham Stadium in London.

== Seeding ==
The seeding system was the same as in the 2010–11 tournament. The 24 competing teams are ranked based on past Heineken Cup and European Challenge Cup performance, with each pool receiving one team from each quartile, or Tier. The requirement to have only one team per country in each pool, however, still applies (with the exception of the inclusion of the seventh English team).

The brackets show each team's European Rugby Club Ranking at the end of the 2010–11 season.

Tier 1	(Ireland) Leinster (1)	(France) Toulouse (2)	(Ireland) Munster (3)	(Wales) Cardiff Blues (4)	(France) Biarritz (5)	(England) Leicester Tigers (6)
Tier 2	(England) Northampton Saints (7)	(France) Clermont Auvergne (10)	(Wales) Ospreys (11)	(England) Bath (12)	(England) Harlequins (13)	(England) London Irish (15)
Tier 3	(Ireland) Ulster (16)	(England) Saracens (17)	(England) Gloucester (18)	(Scotland) Glasgow Warriors (20)	(Wales) Scarlets (21)	(Scotland) Edinburgh (24)
Tier 4	(Ireland) Connacht (25)	(Italy) Benetton Treviso (30)	(France) Castres (31)	(France) Montpellier (32)	(France) Racing Métro (33)	(Italy) Aironi (37)

== Pool stage ==
The draw for the pool stage took place on 7 June 2011. Competition organiser European Rugby Cup (ERC) announced the fixtures, dates, and kickoff times for the first four rounds of pool play on 20 July 2011.

Under ERC rules, tiebreakers within each pool are as follows.

- Competition points earned in head-to-head matches
- Total tries scored in head-to-head matches
- Point differential in head-to-head matches

ERC has four additional tiebreakers, used if tied teams are in different pools, or if the above steps cannot break a tie between teams in the same pool:

- Tries scored in all pool matches
- Point differential in all pool matches
- Best disciplinary record (fewest players receiving red or yellow cards in all pool matches)
- Coin toss

Key to colours
Winner of each pool, advance to quarterfinals.
Two highest-scoring second-place teams advance to quarterfinals.
Third- through fifth- highest-scoring second-place teams parachute into the knockout stage of the European Challenge Cup.

All kickoff times are local to the match location.

=== Pool 1 ===
Team	P	W	D	L	Tries for	Tries against	Try diff	Points for	Points against	Points diff	TB	LB	Pts
(Ireland) Munster [1]	6	6	0	0	14	10	+4	163	118	+45	1	0	25
(Wales) Scarlets (7)	6	3	0	3	12	9	+3	119	124	−5	1	2	15
(England) Northampton Saints	6	2	0	4	18	16	+2	176	160	+16	2	2	12
(France) Castres	6	1	0	5	10	19	−9	111	167	−56	1	2	7

12 November 2011
15:00

Scarlets (Wales)	31 – 23	(France) Castres
Try: Lamont 42' c Morgan 50' c J. Davies 73' m Con: S. Jones (2/2); Pen: S. Jones (3/4) 6', 11', 35'; Priestland (1/1) 80'	Report	Try: Andreu 60' c Masoe 78' c Con: Teulet (2/2); Pen: Teulet (3/3) 2', 31', 46'

Parc y Scarlets, Llanelli
Attendance: 7,860
Referee: Greg Garner (England)

12 November 2011
18:00

Munster (Ireland)	23 – 21	(England) Northampton Saints
Try: Varley 2' c Howlett 40' c Con: O'Gara (2/2); Pen: O'Gara (2/3) 38', 41'; Drop: O'Gara (1/1) 80'	Report	Try: Ashton 8' c Downey 56' m Con: Lamb (1/2); Pen: Lamb (3/4) 12', 20', 44'

Thomond Park, Limerick
Attendance: 26,500
Referee: Nigel Owens (Wales)

18 November 2011
20:00

Northampton Saints (England)	23 – 28	(Wales) Scarlets
Try: Pisi 67' c Wood 79' c Con: Lamb (2/2); Pen: Lamb (3/5) 19', 23', 32'	Report	Try: L. Williams 2' c Shingler 19' c Gilbert 38' c Priestland 62' c Con: Priestland (4/4)

Franklin's Gardens, Northampton
Attendance: 13,475
Referee: Peter Fitzgibbon (Ireland)

19 November 2011
16:40

Castres (France)	24 – 27	(Ireland) Munster
Try: Mach 11' m Lakafia 35' c Con: Bernard (1/2); Pen: Bernard (4/4) 2', 5', 53', 70'	Report	Try: Howlett 22' c O'Mahony 44' c Chambers 66' c Con: O'Gara (3/3); Pen: O'Gara (1/2) 40'; Drop: O'Gara (1/3) 80'

Stade Ernest-Wallon, Toulouse
Attendance: 13,500
Referee: Wayne Barnes (England)

10 December 2011
15:40

Scarlets (Wales)	14 – 17	(Ireland) Munster
Try: Shingler 5' m Pen: Priestland (2/4) 9', 50'; S. Jones (1/1) 68'	Report	Try: Ronan 30' m Pen: O'Gara (4/4) 27', 39', 55', 62'

Parc y Scarlets, Llanelli
Attendance: 13,183
Referee: Romain Poite (France)

10 December 2011
14:30

Castres (France)	41 – 22	(England) Northampton Saints
Try: Malonga 2' c Martial (2) 40' c, 68' c Diarra 77' m Con: Teulet (3/4); Pen: Teulet (5/5) 17', 30', 34', 48', 63'	Report	Try: Sorensen 9' c Elliott (2) 31' m, 44' m Manoa 55' m Con: Myler (1/3)

Stade Pierre-Antoine, Castres
Attendance: 5,000
Referee: John Lacey (Ireland)

18 December 2011
12:45

Munster (Ireland)	19 – 13	(Wales) Scarlets
Try: Coughlan 51' c Con: O'Gara (1/1); Pen: O'Gara (4/5) 4', 34', 43', 62'	Report	Try: Owens 65' c Con: Priestland (1/1); Pen: S. Jones (1/2) 12'; Priestland (1/2) 56'

Thomond Park, Limerick
Attendance: 25,600
Referee: Dave Pearson (England)

18 December 2011
15:00

Northampton Saints (England)	45 – 0	(France) Castres
Try: Foden (2) 62' c, 79' c Artemyev 66' c Haywood 70' c Tonks 77' m Con: Myler (4/5); Pen: Myler (4/4) 12', 44', 47', 50'	Report

Franklin's Gardens, Northampton
Attendance: 11,670
Referee: George Clancy (Ireland)

14 January 2012
13:30

Scarlets (Wales)	17 – 29	(England) Northampton Saints
Try: Iongi 33' m Pen: Priestland (4/4) 9', 13', 21', 52'	Report	Try: Tongaʻuiha 45' c Foden 78' c Con: Myler (1/1); Lamb (1/1); Pen: Myler (5/5) 17', 35', 50', 54', 57'

Parc y Scarlets, Llanelli
Attendance: 9,869
Referee: Alain Rolland (Ireland)

14 January 2012
15:40

Munster (Ireland)	26 – 10	(France) Castres
Try: Murphy 7' c du Preez 67' c Con: O'Gara (2/2); Pen: O'Gara (4/5) 15', 22', 25', 51'	Report	Try: Caballero 17' c Con: Bernard (1/1); Pen: Bernard (1/2) 42'

Thomond Park, Limerick
Attendance: 25,600
Referee: Andrew Small (England)

21 January 2012
18:00

Northampton Saints (England)	36 – 51	(Ireland) Munster
Try: penalty try (2) 15' c, 55' c Armstrong 79' c Con: Lamb (2/2); Myler (1/1); Pen: Lamb (4/5) 5', 11', 39', 66'; Drop: Lamb (1/1) 29'	Report	Try: Botha 30' c Murphy 42' c Zebo (3) 48' m, 71' c, 76' c Con: O'Gara (3/4); Keatley (1/1); Pen: O'Gara (6/6) 13', 19', 28', 37', 64', 68'

Stadium mk, Milton Keynes
Attendance: 22,220
Referee: Romain Poite (France)

21 January 2012
19:00

Castres (France)	13 – 16	(Wales) Scarlets
Try: Forestier 70' c Con: Teulet (1/1); Pen: Kockott (2/3) 33', 39'	Report	Try: Gilbert 11' m Shingler 58' m Pen: Priestland (1/3) 9'; S. Jones (1/2) 77'

Stade Pierre-Antoine, Castres
Attendance: 6,500
Referee: JP Doyle (England)

=== Pool 2 ===
Team	P	W	D	L	Tries for	Tries against	Try diff	Points for	Points against	Points diff	TB	LB	Pts
(Scotland) Edinburgh [3]	6	5	0	1	17	11	+6	156	138	+18	2	0	22
(Wales) Cardiff Blues [7]	6	5	0	1	9	5	+4	145	110	+35	0	1	21
(England) London Irish	6	1	0	5	7	11	−4	116	139	−23	1	4	9
(France) Racing Métro	6	1	0	5	13	19	−6	160	190	−30	1	4	9

11 November 2011
21:00

Racing Métro (France)	20 – 26	(Wales) Cardiff Blues
Try: Imhoff 30' m Pen: Germain (4/5) 4', 15', 55', 69'; Drop: Hernández (1/1) 7'	Report	Try: Filise 12' c Cuthbert 36' c Con: Parks (2/2); Pen: Parks (4/5) 17', 53', 58', 68'

Stade Olympique Yves-du-Manoir, Colombes
Attendance: 9,125
Referee: George Clancy (Ireland)

12 November 2011
13:30

London Irish (England)	19 – 20	(Scotland) Edinburgh
Try: Samson 29' c Con: Homer (1/1); Pen: Homer (4/5) 6', 8', 23', 45'	Report	Try: Jones 15' c McInally 59' c Con: Leonard (1/1); Laidlaw (1/1); Pen: Leonard (1/3) 37'; Laidlaw (1/1) 68'

Madejski Stadium, Reading
Attendance: 6,712
Referee: Romain Poite (France)

18 November 2011
20:00

Cardiff Blues (Wales)	24 – 18	(England) London Irish
Try: Rhys Thomas 6' c L. Williams 39' m Con: Parks (1/2); Pen: Parks (4/5) 3', 28', 50', 69'	Report	Pen: Homer (6/7) 25', 33', 38', 53', 63', 74'

Cardiff City Stadium, Cardiff
Attendance: 10,358
Referee: Jérôme Garcès (France)

18 November 2011
20:00

Edinburgh (Scotland)	48 – 47	(France) Racing Métro
Try: T. Visser (2) 1' c, 76' c Laidlaw 8' c Talei 63' c Brown 68' c Grant 73' c Con: Laidlaw (6/6); Pen: Laidlaw (2/2) 6', 40'	Report	Try: Saubade 12' c Imhoff 15' c Wisniewski 22' c Chavancy (2) 31' c, 47' c Con: Hernández (1/1); Wisniewski (4/4); Pen: Wisniewski (4/4) 5', 41', 53', 66'

Murrayfield, Edinburgh
Attendance: 5,200
Referee: John Lacey (Ireland)

9 December 2011
20:00

Cardiff Blues (Wales)	25 – 8	(Scotland) Edinburgh
Try: Cuthbert 73' c Con: Parks (1/1); Pen: Parks (4/5) 40', 46', 51', 54'; Drop: Parks (2/3) 14', 63'	Report	Try: Jones 61' m Pen: Laidlaw (1/2) 16'

Cardiff City Stadium, Cardiff
Attendance: 6,102
Referee: Wayne Barnes (England)

10 December 2011
16:40

Racing Métro (France)	14 – 34	(England) London Irish
Try: Bobo 17' m Pen: Germain (2/3) 3', 16'; Drop: Wisniewski (1/1) 22'	Report	Try: Spratt 23' c Ansbro 53' c Thompstone (2) 56' c, 72' c Con: Jarvis (4/4); Pen: Armitage (1/1) 14'; Jarvis (1/2) 42'

Stade Olympique Yves-du-Manoir, Colombes
Attendance: 12,152
Referee: Nigel Owens (Wales)

16 December 2011
20:00

Edinburgh (Scotland)	19 – 12	(Wales) Cardiff Blues
Try: T. Visser 14' c Con: Laidlaw (1/1); Pen: Laidlaw (3/5) 3', 11', 36'; Drop: Laidlaw (1/1) 30'	Report	Pen: Parks (3/3) 18', 60', 69'; Halfpenny (1/1) 79'

Murrayfield, Edinburgh
Attendance: 4,384
Referee: Pascal Gauzere (France)

17 December 2011
15:00

London Irish (England)	19 – 25	(France) Racing Métro
Try: Paice 80' c Con: Homer (1/1); Pen: Homer (4/4) 4', 13', 20', 28'	Report	Try: Bobo 54' c Con: Wisniewski (1/1); Pen: Wisniewski (3/3) 11', 15', 22'; Drop: Wisniewski (3/3) 32', 39', 50'

Madejski Stadium, Reading
Attendance: 7,011
Referee: John Lacey (Ireland)

13 January 2012
21:00

Racing Métro (France)	24 – 27	(Scotland) Edinburgh
Try: Steyn 22' c Imhoff 41' c Battut 54' c Con: Hernández (2/2); Descons (1/1); Pen: Wisniewski (1/2) 69'	Report	Try: Rennie 14' c Talei 28' c Denton 47' c Con: Laidlaw (3/3); Pen: Laidlaw (1/2) 72'; Drop: Godman (1/1) 80'

Stade Olympique Yves-du-Manoir, Colombes
Attendance: 6,113
Referee: Dave Pearson (England)

14 January 2012
15:40

London Irish (England)	15 – 22	(Wales) Cardiff Blues
Pen: Jarvis (4/5) 8', 36', 39', 63'; Armitage (1/1) 53'	Report	Try: Warburton 42' c Con: Halfpenny (1/1); Pen: Halfpenny (5/6) 6', 40', 60', 65', 78'

Madejski Stadium, Reading
Attendance: 9,923
Referee: Neil Paterson (Scotland)

22 January 2012
15:15

Cardiff Blues (Wales)	36 – 30	(France) Racing Métro
Try: L. Williams 6' c Cuthbert (2) 30' c, 41' c Con: Halfpenny (3/3); Pen: Halfpenny (5/6) 11', 27', 38', 51', 73'	Report	Try: Matavesi 21' m Bobo 33' c Con: Descons (1/1); Pen: Wisniewski (2/2) 5', 8'; Descons (2/3) 24', 49'; Steyn (2/2) 40', 60'

Cardiff City Stadium, Cardiff
Attendance: 8,091
Referee: Andrew Small (England)

22 January 2012
15:15

Edinburgh (Scotland)	34 – 11	(England) London Irish
Try: T. Visser 10' c Thompson 35' c Talei 71' c Jones 77' c Con: Laidlaw (4/4); Pen: Laidlaw (2/2) 20', 31'	Report	Try: Joseph 66' m Pen: Jarvis (2/2) 9', 23'

Murrayfield, Edinburgh
Attendance: 10,892
Referee: Peter Fitzgibbon (Ireland)

=== Pool 3 ===
Team	P	W	D	L	Tries for	Tries against	Try diff	Points for	Points against	Points diff	TB	LB	Pts
(Ireland) Leinster [2]	6	5	1	0	18	7	+11	172	88	+84	2	0	24
(Scotland) Glasgow Warriors	6	2	1	3	8	12	−4	106	133	−27	0	2	12
(England) Bath	6	2	0	4	11	15	−4	122	151	−29	0	3	11
(France) Montpellier	6	1	2	3	8	11	−3	84	112	−28	0	2	10

12 November 2011
14:30

Montpellier (France)	16 – 16	(Ireland) Leinster
Try: Ouedraogo 22' c Con: Paillaugue (1/1); Pen: Paillaugue (2/2) 2', 25'; Trinh-Duc (1/1) 56'	Report	Try: Cronin 66' c Con: Sexton (1/1); Pen: Sexton (3/4) 5', 16', 80'

Stade de la Mosson, Montpellier
Attendance: 20,182
Referee: Dave Pearson (England)

13 November 2011
12:45

Glasgow Warriors (Scotland)	26 – 21	(England) Bath
Try: Hogg 60' c Gray 80' c Con: Weir (2/2); Pen: Weir (4/6) 2', 34', 39', 73'	Report	Pen: Heathcote (6/6) 2', 18', 44', 56', 62', 67'; Donald (1/1) 78'

Firhill Stadium, Glasgow
Attendance: 4,208
Referee: Christophe Berdos (France)

20 November 2011
12:45

Leinster (Ireland)	38 – 13	(Scotland) Glasgow Warriors
Try: R. Kearney 4' c O'Malley (2) 25' c, 30' c D'Arcy 39' c Boss 80' c Con: Sexton (4/4); Madigan (1/1); Pen: Sexton (1/2) 15'	Report	Try: Pyrgos 73' c Con: Weir (1/1); Pen: Weir (2/2) 2', 22'

RDS Arena, Dublin
Attendance: 17,924
Referee: Andrew Small (England)

20 November 2011
15:00

Bath (England)	16 – 13	(France) Montpellier
Try: Woodburn 8' m Flatman 17' m Pen: Donald (2/2) 4', 43'	Report	Try: Bustos Moyano 46' c Con: Bustos Moyano (1/1); Pen: Bustos Moyano (2/4) 26', 52'

The Rec, Bath
Attendance: 11,785
Referee: Alain Rolland (Ireland)

11 December 2011
12:45

Glasgow Warriors (Scotland)	20 – 15	(France) Montpellier
Try: Martín Aramburú 73' m Pen: Weir (4/6) 12', 20', 33', 35'; Jackson (1/1) 67'	Report	Try: Escande 28' c Matadigo 80' m Con: Bustos Moyano (1/2); Pen: Bustos Moyano (1/1) 17'

Firhill Stadium, Glasgow
Attendance: 5,287
Referee: Greg Garner (England)

11 December 2011
12:45

Bath (England)	13 – 18	(Ireland) Leinster
Try: Banahan 64' c Con: Barkley (1/1); Pen: Barkley (2/2) 15', 35'	Report	Pen: Sexton (6/7) 40', 45', 54', 62', 73', 80'

The Rec, Bath
Attendance: 12,200
Referee: Jérôme Garcès (France)

17 December 2011
16:40

Montpellier (France)	13 – 13	(Scotland) Glasgow Warriors
Try: Audrin 33' c Con: Perraux (1/1); Pen: Perraux (2/4) 46', 51'	Report	Try: Lamont 61' c Con: Weir (1/1); Pen: Jackson (1/2) 44'; Weir (1/2) 77'

Stade Yves-du-Manoir, Montpellier
Attendance: 7,917
Referee: Andrew Small (England)

17 December 2011
18:00

Leinster (Ireland)	52 – 27	(England) Bath
Try: Kearney 3' c Fitzgerald (2) 24' c, 41' c Sexton 32' c Reddan 50' c Ruddock 56' c Madigan 77' c Con: Sexton (6/6); Nacewa (1/1); Drop: Sexton (1/1) 10'	Report	Try: Donald 62' c Attwood 74' c Williams 80' c Con: Barkley (3/3); Pen: Barkley (2/2) 7', 14'

Aviva Stadium, Dublin
Attendance: 46,365
Referee: Romain Poite (France)

14 January 2012
14:00

Montpellier (France)	24 – 22	(England) Bath
Try: Bérard 1' c Tulou 66' c Nagusa 80' c Con: Paillaugue (2/2); Bustos Moyano (1/1); Pen: Paillaugue (1/1) 45'	Report	Try: Caldwell (2) 39' c, 52' c Banahan 71' m Con: Barkley (1/1); Heathcote (1/2); Pen: Barkley (1/2) 8'

Stade Yves-du-Manoir, Montpellier
Attendance: 10,106
Referee: Dudley Phillips (Ireland)

15 January 2012
12:45

Glasgow Warriors (Scotland)	16 – 23	(Ireland) Leinster
Try: Gregor 63' c Con: Weir (1/1); Pen: Weir (3/3) 6', 32', 49'	Report	Try: R. Kearney 43' c Boss 70' c Con: McFadden (2/2); Pen: Sexton (1/2) 27'; McFadden (2/2) 40', 55'

Firhill Stadium, Glasgow
Attendance: 6,479
Referee: Nigel Owens (Wales)

21 January 2012
13:30

Bath (England)	23 – 18	(Scotland) Glasgow Warriors
Try: Biggs 10' c Skirving 43' c Con: Barkley (2/2); Pen: Barkley (3/3) 15', 68', 75'	Report	Try: Seymour 53' c Harley 62' m Con: Wight (1/2); Pen: Weir (2/3) 3', 13'

The Rec, Bath
Attendance: 11,015
Referee: John Lacey (Ireland)

21 January 2012
13:30

Leinster (Ireland)	25 – 3	(France) Montpellier
Try: O'Brien 8' c R. Kearney 15' c Healy 41' m Con: McFadden (2/3); Pen: McFadden (2/2) 12', 39'	Report	Pen: Bustos Moyano (1/1) 66'

RDS Arena, Dublin
Attendance: 18,500
Referee: Greg Garner (England)

=== Pool 4 ===
Team	P	W	D	L	Tries for	Tries against	Try diff	Points for	Points against	Points diff	TB	LB	Pts
(France) Clermont Auvergne [5]	6	4	0	2	26	5	+21	215	69	+146	2	2	20
(Ireland) Ulster [8]	6	4	0	2	16	8	+8	158	87	+71	3	1	20
(England) Leicester Tigers	6	4	0	2	13	8	+5	123	117	+6	1	0	17
(Italy) Aironi	6	0	0	6	4	38	−34	51	274	−223	0	0	0

12 November 2011
14:30

Aironi (Italy)	12 – 28	(England) Leicester Tigers
Pen: Orquera (4/4) 24', 31', 48', 70'	Report	Try: Croft 12' c A. Tuilagi 22' c Morris 80' m Con: Flood (2/3); Pen: Flood (3/4) 2', 4', 46'

Stadio Brianteo, Monza
Attendance: 8,151
Referee: Neil Paterson (Scotland)

12 November 2011
15:40

Ulster (Ireland)	16 – 11	(France) Clermont Auvergne
Try: Humphreys 69' c Con: Humphreys (1/1); Pen: Humphreys (3/4) 12', 40', 50'	Report	Try: Nakaitaci 5' m Pen: Skrela (2/2) 17', 38'

Ravenhill, Belfast
Attendance: 9,385
Referee: Wayne Barnes (England)

18 November 2011
21:00

Clermont Auvergne (France)	54 – 3	(Italy) Aironi
Try: Byrne 10' c Vosloo 18' c James 34' c Bonnaire 50' c Bardy 53' c Buttin 57' m Fofana 70' c Malzieu 75' c Con: Parra (4/4); James (3/4)	Report	Pen: Orquera (1/1) 13'

Stade Marcel-Michelin, Clermont-Ferrand
Attendance: 17,589
Referee: JP Doyle (England)

19 November 2011
18:00

Leicester Tigers (England)	20 – 9	(Ireland) Ulster
Try: Smith 66' m Pen: Flood (5/6) 7', 16', 22', 45', 80'	Report	Pen: Humphreys (3/4) 2', 10', 19'

Welford Road, Leicester
Attendance: 21,473
Referee: Romain Poite (France)

9 December 2011
19:30

Ulster (Ireland)	31 – 10	(Italy) Aironi
Try: Ferris 16' c D'Arcy 40' m Trimble 42' m Marshall 56' c Jackson 68' c Con: Humphreys (3/5)	Report	Try: D'Apice 78' c Con: Olivier (1/1); Pen: Tebaldi (1/3) 20'

Ravenhill, Belfast
Attendance: 7,494
Referee: Andrew Small (England)

11 December 2011
16:00

Clermont Auvergne (France)	30 – 12	(England) Leicester Tigers
Try: Malzieu 37' c Fofana (2) 52' c, 65' c Con: Parra (3/3); Pen: Parra (3/4) 2', 19', 29'	Report	Try: B. Youngs 16' m penalty try 70' c Con: Flood (1/2)

Stade Marcel-Michelin, Clermont-Ferrand
Attendance: 18,000
Referee: Alain Rolland (Ireland)

17 December 2011
13:30

Leicester Tigers (England)	23 – 19	(France) Clermont Auvergne
Try: M. Tuilagi 16' c Salvi 47' c Con: Flood (2/2); Pen: Flood (3/5) 43', 61', 72'	Report	Try: Sivivatu 39' c Con: Parra (1/1); Pen: Parra (2/2) 20', 55'; Drop: Skrela (1/1) 1'; Parra (1/1) 14'

Welford Road, Leicester
Attendance: 20,202
Referee: Nigel Owens (Wales)

17 December 2011
14:30

Aironi (Italy)	20 – 46	(Ireland) Ulster
Try: Sinoti 56' c Quartaroli 60' m Biagi 74' m Con: Orquera (1/1); Pen: Orquera (1/1) 17'	Report	Try: Trimble 5' c penalty try 22' c Court 37' c Gilroy 69' c Diack 77' c Macklin 80' m Con: Humphreys (3/3); Pienaar (2/3); Pen: Humphreys (2/2) 15', 33'

Stadio Brianteo, Monza
Attendance: 6,050
Referee: Greg Garner (England)

13 January 2012
20:00

Ulster (Ireland)	41 – 7	(England) Leicester Tigers
Try: Trimble (2) 5' c, 39' m Gilroy 69' c P. Marshall 72' c Con: Pienaar (3/4); Pen: Pienaar (5/5) 11', 32', 53', 56', 63'	Report	Try: Murphy 13' c Con: Twelvetrees (1/1)

Ravenhill, Belfast
Attendance: 11,900
Referee: Romain Poite (France)

14 January 2012
14:30

Aironi (Italy)	0 – 82	(France) Clermont Auvergne
	Report	Try: Sivivatu (3) 14' c, 16' c, 50' c Byrne (2) 20' m, 40' c Lapandry (2) 24' c, 45' c Malzieu (3) 32' c, 71' c, 78' c James 34' c Vermeulen 47' c Con: Parra (4/5); James (7/7)

Stadio Brianteo, Monza
Attendance: 4,921
Referee: Leighton Hodges (Wales)

21 January 2012
15:40

Leicester Tigers (England)	33 – 6	(Italy) Aironi
Try: Waldrom 42' m Woods 47' c Murphy 55' m Ford 70' c Con: Twelvetrees (1/3); Ford (1/1); Pen: Twelvetrees (3/3) 21', 32', 40'	Report	Pen: Olivier (2/2) 13', 26'

Welford Road, Leicester
Attendance: 19,652
Referee: Jérôme Garcès (France)

21 January 2012
16:40

Clermont Auvergne (France)	19 – 15	(Ireland) Ulster
Try: Paulo 62' c Con: Parra (1/1); Pen: Parra (4/4) 14', 21', 48', 73'	Report	Pen: Pienaar (5/7) 17', 32', 45', 56', 70'

Stade Marcel-Michelin, Clermont-Ferrand
Attendance: 17,633
Referee: Dave Pearson (England)

=== Pool 5 ===
Team	P	W	D	L	Tries for	Tries against	Try diff	Points for	Points against	Points diff	TB	LB	Pts
(England) Saracens [4]	6	5	0	1	13	10	+3	145	107	+38	1	1	23
(France) Biarritz (5)	6	3	0	3	18	7	+11	143	105	+38	3	3	18
(Wales) Ospreys	6	2	1	3	13	16	−3	142	147	−5	1	2	13
(Italy) Benetton Treviso	6	1	1	4	12	23	−11	122	193	−71	0	1	7

12 November 2011
15:40

Ospreys (Wales)	28 – 21	(France) Biarritz
Try: Bowe 62' c Con: Biggar (1/1); Pen: Biggar (7/7) 19', 26', 42', 45', 50', 57', 67'	Report	Try: Balshaw (2) 59' m, 69' c Con: Bosch (1/2); Pen: Bosch (2/3) 47', 53'; Drop: Traille (1/1) 4'

Liberty Stadium, Swansea
Attendance: 7,732
Referee: Andrew Small (England)

13 November 2011
15:00

Saracens (England)	42 – 17	(Italy) Benetton Treviso
Try: Farrell 22' c Strettle 46' c Wyles 60' m Joubert 64' c Smit 77' c Con: Farrell (4/5); Pen: Farrell (3/5) 3', 19', 40'	Report	Try: Sbaraglini 73' c Padro 79' c Con: de Waal (2/2); Pen: de Waal (1/1) 27'

Vicarage Road, Watford
Attendance: 5,077
Referee: John Lacey (Ireland)

19 November 2011
14:30

Biarritz (France)	15 – 10	(England) Saracens
Try: Harinordoquy 56' m Ngwenya 64' c Con: Peyrelongue (1/2); Pen: Peyrelongue (1/1) 63'	Report	Try: Goode 80' c Con: Farrell (1/1); Pen: Farrell (1/3) 51'

Parc des Sports Aguiléra, Biarritz
Attendance: 9,782
Referee: George Clancy (Ireland)

19 November 2011
14:30

Benetton Treviso (Italy)	26 – 26	(Wales) Ospreys
Try: Rizzo 42' c de Jager 47' m Botes 57' m Con: Burton (1/3); Pen: Burton (3/3) 3', 21', 37'	Report	Try: Bowe 18' c Ry. Jones 53' c Con: Biggar (2/2); Pen: Biggar (3/5) 24', 46', 62'; Morgan (1/1) 79'

Stadio Comunale di Monigo, Treviso
Attendance: 4,500
Referee: Pascal Gauzere (France)

10 December 2011
14:30

Benetton Treviso (Italy)	30 – 26	(France) Biarritz
Try: Rizzo 16' c Barbieri 20' c Van Zyl 31' c Con: Burton (3/3); Pen: Burton (3/4) 40', 46', 77'	Report	Try: Taele 25' m Bosch 37' c Traille 58' c Lesgourgues 63' c Con: Baby (1/2); Peyrelongue (2/2)

Stadio Comunale di Monigo, Treviso
Attendance: 4,000
Referee: JP Doyle (England)

10 December 2011
18:00

Saracens (England)	31 – 26	(Wales) Ospreys
Try: Gill 2' c Joubert 14' c Wyles 45' m Con: Farrell (2/3); Pen: Farrell (4/6) 10', 33', 39', 72'	Report	Try: Beck (2) 12' c, 57' c Con: Biggar (2/2); Pen: Biggar (4/6) 7', 22', 41', 74'

Wembley Stadium, London
Attendance: 41,063
Referee: Pascal Gauzere (France)

16 December 2011
20:00

Ospreys (Wales)	13 – 16	(England) Saracens
Try: Gough 65' c Con: Biggar (1/1); Pen: Biggar (2/4) 11', 25'	Report	Try: Joubert 26' c Con: Farrell (1/1); Pen: Farrell (3/4) 5', 16', 35'

Liberty Stadium, Swansea
Attendance: 7,098
Referee: Jérôme Garcès (France)

16 December 2011
21:00

Biarritz (France)	29 – 12	(Italy) Benetton Treviso
Try: Balshaw 44' c Haylett-Petty 51' m Lauret 72' c Heguy 79' c Con: Peyrelongue (3/4); Pen: Peyrelongue (1/1) 37'	Report	Pen: Burton (4/4) 5', 12', 31', 33'

Parc des Sports Aguiléra, Biarritz
Attendance: 7,500
Referee: Peter Fitzgibbon (Ireland)

13 January 2012
20:00

Ospreys (Wales)	44 – 17	(Italy) Benetton Treviso
Try: Bowe 2' c Beck (2) 18' m, 31' c penalty try (2) 45' c, 77' c Fotuali'i 68' m Con: Biggar (3/4); Morgan (1/2); Pen: Biggar (2/2) 8', 16'	Report	Try: Gori 11' c Padro 50' c Con: Burton (1/1); Botes (1/1); Pen: Burton (1/1) 5'

Liberty Stadium, Swansea
Attendance: 5,411
Referee: JP Doyle (England)

15 January 2012
15:00

Saracens (England)	20 – 16	(France) Biarritz
Try: Spencer 19' m Pen: Farrell (5/5) 12', 26', 36', 63', 78'	Report	Try: Yachvili 58' c Con: Yachvili (1/1); Pen: Yachvili (3/4) 10', 13', 68'

Vicarage Road, Watford
Attendance: 6,789
Referee: George Clancy (Ireland)

22 January 2012
14:00

Benetton Treviso (Italy)	20 – 26	(England) Saracens
Try: Barbieri 12' c Iannone 20' c Con: Burton (2/2); Pen: Burton (1/1) 46'; Drop: Burton (1/1) 25'	Report	Try: Botha 16' c Strettle 41' c Con: Farrell (2/2); Pen: Farrell (4/4) 10', 37', 48', 62'

Stadio Comunale di Monigo, Treviso
Attendance: 4,500
Referee: Alain Rolland (Ireland)

22 January 2012
14:00

Biarritz (France)	36 – 5	(Wales) Ospreys
Try: Ngwenya (3) 4' c, 10' c, 63' c Baby 51' m Balshaw 58' c Con: Yachvili (4/5); Pen: Yachvili (1/1) 25'	Report	Try: Hibbard 62' m

Parc des Sports Aguiléra, Biarritz
Attendance: 9,412
Referee: Wayne Barnes (England)

=== Pool 6 ===
Team	P	W	D	L	Tries for	Tries against	Try diff	Points for	Points against	Points diff	TB	LB	Pts
(France) Toulouse [6]	6	4	0	2	16	11	+5	150	105	+45	1	1	18
(England) Harlequins (6)	6	4	0	2	11	7	+4	122	94	+28	0	1	17
(England) Gloucester	6	3	0	3	10	12	−2	111	122	−11	1	2	15
(Ireland) Connacht	6	1	0	5	5	12	−7	68	130	−62	0	2	6

11 November 2011
20:00

Harlequins (England)	25 – 17	(Ireland) Connacht
Try: Dickson 31' c Con: Evans (1/1); Pen: Evans (6/6) 4', 9', 19', 37', 75', 77'	Report	Try: O'Halloran 13' c Duffy 57' c Con: Nikora (1/1); O'Connor (1/1); Pen: Nikora (1/1) 7'

Twickenham Stoop, London
Attendance: 11,856
Referee: Jérôme Garcès (France)

13 November 2011
16:00

Toulouse (France)	21 – 17	(England) Gloucester
Try: Matanavou 37' m Poitrenaud 72' c Con: Beauxis (1/1); Pen: McAlister (2/3) 34', 51'; Beauxis (1/1) 65'	Report	Try: Sharples 31' c Trinder 68' c Con: Burns (2/2); Pen: Burns (1/3) 11'

Stade Ernest-Wallon, Toulouse
Attendance: 18,500
Referee: Peter Fitzgibbon (Ireland)

19 November 2011
15:40

Gloucester (England)	9 – 28	(England) Harlequins
Pen: Burns (3/5) 10', 26', 48'	Report	Try: Brown 5' c Hopper 39' m Easter 72' c Con: Evans (2/3); Pen: Evans (3/3) 17', 41', 60'

Kingsholm, Gloucester
Attendance: 12,320
Referee: Christophe Berdos (France)

19 November 2011
18:00

Connacht (Ireland)	10 – 36	(France) Toulouse
Try: penalty try 69' c Con: Nikora (1/1); Pen: Nikora (1/1) 34'	Report	Try: Bouilhou 21' c penalty try 46' c Nyanga 76' c Con: Beauxis (3/3); Pen: Beauxis (4/4) 5', 14', 32', 38'; Drop: Beauxis (1/1) 11'

The Sportsground, Galway
Attendance: 9,120
Referee: Greg Garner (England)

9 December 2011
20:00

Harlequins (England)	10 – 21	(France) Toulouse
Try: Brown 48' c Con: Evans (1/1); Pen: Evans (1/1) 9'	Report	Try: Matanavou (2) 17' m, 66' c Con: McAlister (1/2); Pen: McAlister (3/4) 5', 20', 56'

Twickenham Stoop, London
Attendance: 14,282
Referee: George Clancy (Ireland)

10 December 2011
13:30

Connacht (Ireland)	10 – 14	(England) Gloucester
Try: Duffy 33' c Con: O'Connor (1/1); Pen: O'Connor (1/2) 43'	Report	Try: Simpson-Daniel 30' m Pen: Burns (3/5) 6', 16', 71'

The Sportsground, Galway
Attendance: 5,115
Referee: Neil Paterson (Scotland)

17 December 2011
15:40

Gloucester (England)	23 – 19	(Ireland) Connacht
Try: Taylor 20' c May 75' c Con: Taylor (1/1); Burns (1/1); Pen: Taylor (1/1) 7'; Burns (2/2) 57', 68'	Report	Try: O'Halloran 11' c Con: O'Connor (1/1); Pen: O'Connor (4/5) 30', 37', 45', 72'

Kingsholm, Gloucester
Attendance: 10,786
Referee: Leighton Hodges (Wales)

18 December 2011
16:00

Toulouse (France)	24 – 31	(England) Harlequins
Try: Maestri 37' c Doussain 69' m Con: Doussain (1/2); Pen: McAlister (1/4) 3'; Doussain (3/4) 45', 48', 60'	Report	Try: Brown (2) 11' m, 61' c Gray 22' c Con: Evans (2/3); Pen: Evans (4/4) 5', 63', 72', 75'

Stadium Municipal, Toulouse
Attendance: 32,000
Referee: Alain Rolland (Ireland)

14 January 2012
16:40

Toulouse (France)	24 – 3	(Ireland) Connacht
Try: Matanavou (2) 20' m, 68' c Médard 34' m Picamoles 46' c Con: Beauxis (2/2)	Report	Pen: O'Connor (1/2) 14'

Stade Ernest-Wallon, Toulouse
Attendance: 18,508
Referee: Wayne Barnes (England)

14 January 2012
18:00

Harlequins (England)	20 – 14	(England) Gloucester
Try: Hopper 18' c Brown 73' c Con: Evans (2/2); Pen: Evans (2/2) 12', 46'	Report	Try: Simpson-Daniel 29' m Pen: Burns (3/3) 10', 25', 53'

Twickenham Stoop, London
Attendance: 12,772
Referee: Pascal Gauzere (France)

20 January 2012
20:00

Connacht (Ireland)	9 – 8	(England) Harlequins
Pen: O'Connor (3/4) 5', 12', 15'	Report	Try: S. Smith 8' m Pen: Evans (1/2) 60'

The Sportsground, Galway
Attendance: 5,420
Referee: Nigel Owens (Wales)

20 January 2012
20:00

Gloucester (England)	34 – 24	(France) Toulouse
Try: May (2) 3' c, 74' c Qera 27' c Sharples 46' c Con: Burns (4/4); Pen: Burns (2/4) 57', 73'	Report	Try: Dusautoir 7' c Matanavou (2) 16' c, 64' c Con: Beauxis (3/3); Pen: Beauxis (1/3) 14'

Kingsholm, Gloucester
Attendance: 13,077
Referee: George Clancy (Ireland)

== See also ==
- 2011-12 Heineken Cup
