= 2012–13 Heineken Cup pool stage =

- Season: 2012–13 Heineken Cup
- Date: 12 October 2012 – 20 January 2013

Qualifiers
- Seed 1: (England) Harlequins
- Seed 2: (France) Clermont
- Seed 3: (France) Toulon
- Seed 4: (England) Saracens
- Seed 5: (Ireland) Ulster
- Seed 6: (England) Leicester Tigers
- Seed 7: (France) Montpellier
- Seed 8: (Ireland) Munster

The 2012–13 Heineken Cup pool stage was the first stage of the 18th season of the Heineken Cup, Europe's top competition for rugby union clubs. It involved 24 teams competing for eight quarter-final berths, awarded to the winners of each of six pools plus the two top-ranked second-place teams. The next three best runners-up were parachuted into the Amlin Challenge Cup.

The pool stage began with two matches on 12 October 2012 and ended on 20 January 2013. The first four rounds of fixtures were released on 26 July 2012. The quarter-finalists then participated in a knockout tournament that ultimately ended with the final on Saturday 18 May 2013 at Aviva Stadium in Dublin.

== Seeding ==
The seeding system was the same as in the 2011–12 tournament. The 24 competing teams were ranked based on past Heineken Cup and European Challenge Cup performance, with each pool receiving one team from each quartile, or Tier. The requirement to have only one team per country in each pool, however, still applied (with the exception of the inclusion of the seventh French team).

The brackets show each team's European Rugby Club Ranking at the end of the 2011–12 season.

Tier 1	(Ireland) Leinster (1)	(France) Toulouse (2)	(France) Biarritz (3)	(Ireland) Munster (4)	(Wales) Cardiff Blues (5)	(England) Northampton Saints (6)
Tier 2	(France) Clermont Auvergne (7)	(Ireland) Ulster (8)	(England) Leicester Tigers (9)	(England) Harlequins (11)	(France) Toulon (12)	(Scotland) Edinburgh (13)
Tier 3	(Wales) Ospreys (14)	(Wales) Scarlets (18)	(Scotland) Glasgow Warriors (19)	(England) Saracens (20)	(Ireland) Connacht (24)	(England) Sale Sharks (25)
Tier 4	(Italy) Benetton Treviso (27)	(France) Castres (28)	(France) Racing Métro (29)	(France) Montpellier (30)	(England) Exeter Chiefs (34)	(Italy) Zebre (NR)

== Pool stage ==
The draw for the pool stage took place on 12 June 2012 at Aviva Stadium.

Under rules of the competition organiser, European Rugby Cup, tiebreakers within each pool are as follows.

- Competition points earned in head-to-head matches
- Total tries scored in head-to-head matches
- Point differential in head-to-head matches

ERC has four additional tiebreakers, used if tied teams are in different pools, or if the above steps cannot break a tie between teams in the same pool:

- Tries scored in all pool matches
- Point differential in all pool matches
- Best disciplinary record (fewest players receiving red or yellow cards in all pool matches)
- Coin toss

Key to colours
Winner of each pool, advance to quarterfinals.
Two highest-scoring second-place teams advance to quarterfinals.
Third- through fifth- highest-scoring second-place teams parachute into the knockout stage of the European Challenge Cup.

All kickoff times are local to the match location.

=== Pool 1 ===
Team	P	W	D	L	PF	PA	Diff	TF	TA	TB	LB	Pts
(England) Saracens (3)	6	5	0	1	180	76	+104	15	6	2	1	23
(Ireland) Munster (8)	6	4	0	2	133	73	+60	14	4	2	2	20
(France) Racing Métro	6	3	0	3	103	125	−22	7	11	0	0	12
(Scotland) Edinburgh	6	0	0	6	36	178	−142	3	18	0	0	0

13 October 2012
14:35

Racing Métro (France)	22–17	(Ireland) Munster (1 BP)
Try: Machenaud 31' c Con: Barkley (1/1); Pen: Barkley (4/5) 18', 38', 50', 76'; Bergamasco (1/1) 78'	Report	Try: Dougall 14' c Zebo 71' c Con: O'Gara (1/1); Keatley (1/1); Pen: O'Gara (1/1) 8'

Stade de France, Saint-Denis
Attendance: 21,102
Referee: Greg Garner (England)

13 October 2012
13:35

Edinburgh (Scotland)	0–45	(England) Saracens (1 BP)
	Report	Try: Tomkins 13' c Farrell 59' m Ashton 65' c Goode 68' c Hodgson 75' c Con: Hodgson (4/5); Pen: Hodgson (4/4) 23', 30', 39', 50'

Murrayfield, Edinburgh
Attendance: 6,543
Referee: John Lacey (Ireland)

20 October 2012
16:40

Saracens (England)	30–13	(France) Racing Métro
Try: Wyles 21' c Borthwick 28' c Fraser 76' c Con: Hodgson (3/3); Pen: Hodgson (3/4) 8', 36', 58'	Report	Try: Imhoff 61' c Con: Estebanez (1/1); Pen: Barkley (1/2) 1'; Germain (1/1) 69'

King Baudouin Stadium, Brussels
Attendance: 18,212
Referee: Nigel Owens (Wales)

21 October 2012
12:45

(1 BP) Munster (Ireland)	33–0	(Scotland) Edinburgh
Try: Murray 50' c P. O'Mahony 70' c Dougall 73' m Varley 80' m Con: Keatley (2/4); Pen: Keatley (3/5) 3', 23', 56'	Report

Thomond Park, Limerick
Attendance: 22,146
Referee: Wayne Barnes (England)

8 December 2012
18:00

Munster (Ireland)	15–9	(England) Saracens (1 BP)
Pen: O'Gara (5/5) 4', 28', 38', 49', 53'	Report	Pen: Farrell (3/7) 36', 43', 78'

Thomond Park, Limerick
Attendance: 25,600
Referee: Pascal Gaüzère (France)

8 December 2012
19:00

Racing Métro (France)	19–9	(Scotland) Edinburgh
Try: Imhoff 19' m Ben Arous 60' m Pen: Barkley (2/2) 10', 30'; Machenaud (1/1) 77'	Report	Pen: Laidlaw (3/6) 1', 39', 65'

Stade Yves-du-Manoir, Colombes
Attendance: 6,873
Referee: Peter Fitzgibbon (Ireland)

14 December 2012
20:00

Edinburgh (Scotland)	3–15	(France) Racing Métro
Pen: Francis (1/5) 28'	Report	Pen: Barkley (1/2) 4'; Germain (4/5) 7', 53', 61', 68'

Murrayfield, Edinburgh
Attendance: 4,598
Referee: Dudley Phillips (Ireland)

16 December 2012
15:00

Saracens (England)	19–13	(Ireland) Munster (1 BP)
Try: Strettle 20' c Con: Farrell (1/1); Pen: Farrell (4/6) 8', 56', 59', 76'	Report	Try: Howlett 25' c Con: O'Gara (1/1); Pen: O'Gara (2/4) 16', 50'

Vicarage Road, Watford
Attendance: 16,223
Referee: Pascal Gaüzère (France)

12 January 2013
16:40

Racing Métro (France)	28–37	(England) Saracens
Try: Ducalcon 6' c Imhoff (2) 16' m, 20' c Con: Descons (2/3); Pen: Descons (3/3) 25', 29', 56'	Report	Try: Wyles 45' c Con: Farrell (1/1); Pen: Farrell (10/10) 10', 19', 23', 27', 34', 38', 52', 62', 74', 80'

Stade de la Beaujoire, Nantes
Attendance: 35,085
Referee: Alain Rolland (Ireland)

13 January 2013
12:45

Edinburgh (Scotland)	17–26	(Ireland) Munster
Try: Fife (2) 71' c, 76' c Con: Laidlaw (2/2); Pen: Laidlaw (1/1) 32'	Report	Try: penalty try 53' c Murray 61' c Con: O'Gara (2/2); Pen: O'Gara (4/5) 2', 25', 29', 35'

Murrayfield, Edinburgh
Attendance: 6,220
Referee: Romain Poite (France)

20 January 2013
12:45

(1 BP) Munster (Ireland)	29–6	(France) Racing Métro
Try: Murray 24' c Zebo (3) 28' m, 47' c, 54' m Sherry 35' m Con: Keatley (2/5)	Report	Pen: Germain (2/2) 12', 31'

Thomond Park, Limerick
Attendance: 25,600
Referee: Wayne Barnes (England)

20 January 2013
12:45

(1 BP) Saracens (England)	40–7	(Scotland) Edinburgh
Try: Ashton (2) 26' m, 45' m Stevens 52' c Hodgson 74' c Wyles 80' c Con: Farrell (3/5); Pen: Farrell (3/5) 9', 14', 21'	Report	Try: Tonks 31' c Con: Laidlaw (1/1)

Vicarage Road, Watford
Attendance: 5,673
Referee: Jérôme Garcès (France)

=== Pool 2 ===
Team	P	W	D	L	PF	PA	Diff	TF	TA	TB	LB	Pts
(England) Leicester Tigers (5)	6	4	1	1	119	103	+16	13	9	2	0	20
(France) Toulouse	6	4	0	2	132	84	+48	15	4	2	1	19
(Wales) Ospreys	6	2	1	3	120	124	−4	11	15	1	1	12
(Italy) Benetton Treviso	6	1	0	5	107	167	−60	9	20	0	1	5

12 October 2012
20:00

(1 BP) Ospreys (Wales)	38–17	(Italy) Benetton Treviso
Try: Walker 19' c Dirksen (2) 44' c, 72' m Beck 80' c Con: Biggar (3/4); Pen: Biggar (4/4) 3', 7', 14', 63'	Report	Try: Vosawai 55' c McLean 57' c Con: Burton (2/2); Pen: Burton (1/1) 17'

Liberty Stadium, Swansea
Attendance: 8,746
Referee: Neil Paterson (Scotland)

14 October 2012
16:00

Toulouse (France)	23–9	(England) Leicester Tigers
Try: Fickou 37' m Pen: McAlister (6/7) 17', 26', 47', 54', 57', 61'	Report	Pen: Flood (3/3) 14', 22', 34'

Stade Municipal, Toulouse
Attendance: 28,000
Referee: Nigel Owens (Wales)

20 October 2012
14:35

Benetton Treviso (Italy)	21–33	(France) Toulouse
Pen: Burton (7/7) 2', 9', 11', 14', 24', 33', 46'	Report	Try: penalty try 53' m Picamoles 58' c Clerc 63' c Con: McAlister (2/3); Pen: McAlister (4/6) 6', 20', 30', 43'

Stadio Comunale di Monigo, Treviso
Attendance: 5,000
Referee: Leighton Hodges (Wales)

21 October 2012
15:00

(1 BP) Leicester Tigers (England)	39–22	(Wales) Ospreys
Try: Tuilagi (2) 31' c, 79' c Flood 70' c Youngs 75' m Con: Flood (2/4); Pen: Flood (5/6) 28', 44', 49', 52', 66'	Report	Try: Ry. Jones 1' c Con: Biggar (1/1); Pen: Biggar (5/5) 10', 41', 57', 61', 72'

Welford Road, Leicester
Attendance: 20,224
Referee: Romain Poite (France)

8 December 2012
14:35

(1 BP) Toulouse (France)	30–14	(Wales) Ospreys
Try: Fritz 7' c Nyanga 15' m Clerc 55' m Johnston 62' m Huget 74' m Con: McAlister (1/3); Pen: Doussain (1/1) 80'	Report	Try: Fotuali'i 32' c Bevington 77' c Con: Biggar (1/1); Morgan (1/1)

Stade Ernest-Wallon, Toulouse
Attendance: 17,865
Referee: Alain Rolland (Ireland)

9 December 2012
15:00

(1 BP) Leicester Tigers (England)	33–25	(Italy) Benetton Treviso
Try: penalty try 16' c Tuilagi 24' m Salvi (2) 29' c, 38' c Smith 55' c Con: Ford (4/5)	Report	Try: Budd 31' c Cittadini 45' c Loamanu 64' m Con: Di Bernardo (2/3); Pen: Di Bernardo (2/2) 61', 68'

Welford Road, Leicester
Attendance: 18,432
Referee: George Clancy (Ireland)

15 December 2012
14:35

(1 BP) Benetton Treviso (Italy)	13–14	(England) Leicester Tigers
Try: penalty try 27' c Con: Di Bernardo (1/1); Pen: Di Bernardo (2/3) 35', 45'	Report	Try: Thompstone 12' c penalty try 77' c Con: Ford (2/2)

Stadio Comunale di Monigo, Treviso
Attendance: 3,500
Referee: Alain Rolland (Ireland)

15 December 2012
13:35

Ospreys (Wales)	17–6	(France) Toulouse
Try: Walker 61' m Pen: Biggar (3/3) 2', 33', 60'; Drop: Biggar (1/1) 20'	Report	Pen: Doussain (1/2) 27'; Drop: Doussain (1/1) 40'

Liberty Stadium, Swansea
Attendance: 10,110
Referee: George Clancy (Ireland)

13 January 2013
15:00

Ospreys (Wales)	15–15	(England) Leicester Tigers
Try: Bearman 31' c Spratt 75' m Con: Biggar (1/2); Pen: Biggar (1/5) 28'	Report	Try: B. Youngs 67' c Morris 72' m Con: Flood (1/2); Pen: Flood (1/1) 38'

Liberty Stadium, Swansea
Attendance: 13,126
Referee: John Lacey (Ireland)

13 January 2013
16:00

(1 BP) Toulouse (France)	35–14	(Italy) Benetton Treviso
Try: Botha 6' c Albacete 29' c Clerc 44' c Fritz 61' c Huget 80' c Con: McAlister (5/5)	Report	Try: Benvenuti 10' m Pen: Botes (3/4) 3', 20', 39'

Stade Ernest-Wallon, Toulouse
Attendance: 15,382
Referee: Wayne Barnes (England)

20 January 2013
15:00

Leicester Tigers (England)	9–5	(France) Toulouse (1 BP)
Pen: Flood (3/4) 6', 31', 38'		Try: Huget 48' m

Welford Road, Leicester
Attendance: 24,000
Referee: George Clancy (Ireland)

20 January 2013
16:00

Benetton Treviso (Italy)	17–14	(Wales) Ospreys (1 BP)
Try: Zanni 74' c Pratichetti 79' c Con: Burton (2/2); Pen: Burton (1/1) 4'		Try: Isaacs 58' m Pen: Biggar (2/2) 8', 14'; Drop: Biggar (1/1) 47'

Stadio Comunale di Monigo, Treviso
Attendance: 2,300
Referee: Greg Garner (England)

=== Pool 3 ===
Team	P	W	D	L	PF	PA	Diff	TF	TA	TB	LB	Pts
(England) Harlequins (1)	6	6	0	0	243	71	+172	28	6	4	0	28
(France) Biarritz	6	3	0	3	123	101	+22	14	7	2	1	15
(Ireland) Connacht	6	3	0	3	96	138	−42	5	13	0	0	12
(Italy) Zebre	6	0	0	6	72	224	−152	6	27	0	1	1

13 October 2012
14:35

Zebre (Italy)	10–19	(Ireland) Connacht
Try: Ferrarini 72' c Con: Halangahu (1/1); Pen: Halangahu (1/2) 7'	Report	Try: Muldoon 62' c Con: Parks (1/1); Pen: Parks (4/5) 4', 17', 40', 60'

Stadio XXV Aprile, Parma
Attendance: 1,800
Referee: Leighton Hodges (Wales)

13 October 2012
18:00

(1 BP) Harlequins (England)	40–13	(France) Biarritz Olympique
Try: Care 6' c Buchanan 44' c Turner-Hall 67' c Stegmann 78' c Con: Evans (1/1); Botica (3/3); Pen: Botica (4/5) 18', 31', 51', 64'	Report	Try: Héguy 23' c Con: Peyrelongue (1/1); Pen: Peyrelongue (2/2) 14', 28'

The Stoop, London
Attendance: 13,815
Referee: George Clancy (Ireland)

20 October 2012
19:00

(1 BP) Biarritz Olympique (France)	38–17	(Italy) Zebre
Try: Barcella 4' c Lesgourgues (2) 10' c, 52' c Ngwenya 17' m Taele 45' m Héguy 59' c Con: Barraque (3/5); Peyrelongue (1/1)	Report	Try: Van Schalkwyk 76' m Pen: Halangahu (3/3) 7', 24', 48'; Garcia (1/1) 29'

Parc des Sports Aguiléra, Biarritz
Attendance: 7,182
Referee: Dudley Phillips (Ireland)

20 October 2012
18:00

Connacht (Ireland)	22–30	(England) Harlequins
Try: McSharry 6' c Con: Parks (1/1); Pen: Parks (5/5) 10', 17', 25', 27', 44'	Report	Try: Care (2) 30' m, 37' c Con: Botica (1/2); Pen: Botica (6/7) 4', 10', 15', 40', 55', 63'

Sportsground, Galway
Attendance: 8,199
Referee: Jérôme Garcès (France)

7 December 2012
20:00

Connacht (Ireland)	22–14	(France) Biarritz Olympique
Try: Vainikolo 5' c Con: Parks (1/1); Pen: Parks (3/4) 46', 51', 77'; Drop: Parks (2/3) 23', 72'	Report	Try: Harinordoquy 80' m Pen: Yachvili (3/5) 2', 19', 38'

Sportsground, Galway
Attendance: 6,583
Referee: Greg Garner (England)

8 December 2012
14:35

Zebre (Italy)	14–57	(England) Harlequins (1 BP)
Try: Sarto 36' c Chillon 74' c Con: Orquera (2/2)	Report	Try: Smith (2) 26' c, 33' c Easter 42' c penalty try (2) 56' c, 63' c Hopper 58' c Buchanan 70' m Botica 75' c Con: Evans (6/7); Botica (1/1); Pen: Evans (1/2) 25'

Stadio XXV Aprile, Parma
Attendance: 1,600
Referee: Neil Paterson (Scotland)

14 December 2012
21:00

Biarritz Olympique (France)	17–0	(Ireland) Connacht
Try: Balshaw 30' c Burotu 79' c Con: Yachvili (2/2); Pen: Yachvili (1/2) 2'	Report

Parc des Sports Aguiléra, Biarritz
Attendance: 6,231
Referee: Leighton Hodges (Wales)

15 December 2012
15:00

(1 BP) Harlequins (England)	53–5	(Italy) Zebre
Try: Casson 8' c penalty try 37' c Botica 42' c Easter 50' c Smith 57' c Care 64' m Dickson 75' c Con: Evans (6/7); Pen: Evans (2/2) 3', 31'	Report	Try: Trevisan 26' m

The Stoop, London
Attendance: 12,036
Referee: Mathieu Raynal (France)

12 January 2013
13:35

(1 BP) Harlequins (England)	47–8	(Ireland) Connacht
Try: penalty try 34' c Williams (2) 41' c, 52' m Monye 64' m Lowe 78' c Botica 80' c Con: Evans (2/4); Botica (2/2); Pen: Evans (3/4) 8', 13', 39'	Report	Try: O'Connor 62' m Pen: Jarvis (1/1) 10'

The Stoop, London
Attendance: 13,270
Referee: Neil Paterson (Scotland)

12 January 2013
14:35

Zebre (Italy)	6–32	(France) Biarritz Olympique (1 BP)
Pen: Orquera (2/3) 12', 16'	Report	Try: Baby 7' c Bosch (2) 31' c, 56' c Burotu 75' m Con: Yachvili (3/3); Pen: Yachvili (2/2) 6', 11'

Stadio XXV Aprile, Parma
Attendance: 1,200
Referee: Peter Fitzgibbon (Ireland)

18 January 2013
20:00

Connacht (Ireland)	25–20	(Italy) Zebre (1 BP)
Try: penalty try 45' c Con: Parks (1/1); Pen: Parks (4/5) 10', 15', 33', 71'; Drop: Parks (2/2) 24', 74'	Report	Try: Trevisan 59' m Pen: Halangahu (5/5) 12', 27', 49', 51', 69'

Sportsground, Galway
Attendance: 5,803
Referee: Pascal Gaüzère (France)

18 January 2013
21:00

(1 BP) Biarritz Olympique (France)	9–16	(England) Harlequins
Pen: Yachvili (3/5) 11', 45', 53'	Report	Try: Guest 29' c Con: Evans (1/1); Pen: Evans (3/3) 16', 56', 73'

Parc des Sports Aguiléra, Biarritz
Attendance: 7,897
Referee: John Lacey (Ireland)

=== Pool 4 ===
Team	P	W	D	L	PF	PA	Diff	TF	TA	TB	LB	Pts
(Ireland) Ulster (6)	6	5	0	1	126	55	+71	12	5	2	1	23
(England) Northampton Saints	6	3	0	3	94	109	−15	9	11	1	2	15
(France) Castres	6	3	0	3	77	98	−21	6	6	0	2	14
(Scotland) Glasgow Warriors	6	1	0	5	70	105	−35	7	12	0	2	6

12 October 2012
20:00

(1 BP) Ulster (Ireland)	41–17	(France) Castres Olympique
Try: Trimble 8' c P. Marshall (2) 21' c, 42' m Pienaar 80' c Con: Jackson (3/4); Pen: Jackson (5/5) 7', 16', 36', 45', 60'	Report	Try: Andreu 32' c Garvey 51' c Con: Teulet (2/2); Pen: Teulet (1/1) 4'

Ravenhill, Belfast
Attendance: 11,451
Referee: Andrew Small (England)

14 October 2012
12:45

(1 BP) Northampton Saints (England)	24–15	(Scotland) Glasgow Warriors
Try: G. Pisi (2) 36' m, 40' c Myler 43' m Artemyev 70' c Con: Myler (1/3); Lamb (1/1)	Report	Try: Strauss 24' c Lamont 28' m Con: Horne (1/1); Pen: Horne (1/1) 18'

Franklin's Gardens, Northampton
Attendance: 12,115
Referee: Romain Poite (France)

19 October 2012
21:00

Castres Olympique (France)	21–16	(England) Northampton Saints (1 BP)
Try: Bonnefond 7' c Claassen 51' m Con: Teulet (1/1); Pen: Teulet (1/2) 14'; Kockott (1/2) 32'; Drop: Talès (1/1) 61'	Report	Try: G. Pisi 59' c Con: Myler (1/1); Pen: Myler (3/3) 16', 23', 72'

Stade Ernest-Wallon, Toulouse
Attendance: 11,425
Referee: Alain Rolland (Ireland)

19 October 2012
20:00

Glasgow Warriors (Scotland)	8–19	(Ireland) Ulster
Try: Matawalu 77' m Pen: Horne (1/4) 20'	Report	Try: Henry 60' c Con: Jackson (1/1); Pen: Jackson (4/6) 23', 27', 63', 75'

Scotstoun Stadium, Glasgow
Attendance: 6,194
Referee: Mathieu Raynal (France)

7 December 2012
19:35

(1 BP) Glasgow Warriors (Scotland)	6–9	(France) Castres Olympique
Pen: Wight (2/3) 12', 22'	Report	Pen: Kockott (3/7) 20', 36', 57'

Scotstoun Stadium, Glasgow
Attendance: 3,348
Referee: Wayne Barnes (England)

7 December 2012
20:00

Northampton Saints (England)	6–25	(Ireland) Ulster (1 BP)
Pen: Lamb (2/5) 20', 40'	Report	Try: Trimble 9' m Bowe 33' m Payne 44' c Tuohy 78' m Con: Jackson (1/4); Pen: Jackson (1/3) 23'

Franklin's Gardens, Northampton
Attendance: 13,475
Referee: Jérôme Garcès (France)

15 December 2012
18:00

(1 BP) Ulster (Ireland)	9–10	(England) Northampton Saints
Pen: Jackson (3/4) 30', 38', 42'	Report	Try: Van Velze 17' c Con: Myler (1/1); Pen: Myler (1/1) 6'

Ravenhill, Belfast
Attendance: 10,977
Referee: Nigel Owens (Wales)

16 December 2012
13:45

Castres Olympique (France)	10–8	(Scotland) Glasgow Warriors (1 BP)
Try: Caballero 73' c Con: Kirkpatrick (1/1); Pen: Teulet (1/3) 5'	Report	Try: Barclay 38' m Pen: Horne (1/2) 1'

Stade Pierre-Antoine, Castres
Attendance: 8,224
Referee: Andrew Small (England)

11 January 2013
20:00

Northampton Saints (England)	18–12	(France) Castres Olympique (1 BP)
Pen: Myler (3/3) 19', 30', 50'; Lamb (3/3) 65', 71', 78'	Report	Pen: Kockott (4/5) 16', 33', 68', 80'

Franklin's Gardens, Northampton
Attendance: 11,891
Referee: George Clancy (Ireland)

11 January 2013
20:00

Ulster (Ireland)	23–6	(Scotland) Glasgow Warriors
Try: Williams 19' c Payne 73' m Cave 78' m Con: Pienaar (1/3); Pen: Pienaar (2/4) 6', 62'	Report	Pen: Weir (2/4) 48', 55'

Ravenhill, Belfast
Attendance: 10,940
Referee: Pascal Gaüzère (France)

19 January 2013
13:35

Glasgow Warriors (Scotland)	27–20	(England) Northampton Saints (1 BP)
Try: Strauss 46' c Matawalu 66' c Horne 80' c Con: Wight (2/2); Horne (1/1); Pen: Jackson (2/2) 1', 11'	Report	Try: Waldouck 30' c G. Pisi 58' m Foden 71' m Con: Myler (1/1); Pen: Myler (1/1) 13'

Scotstoun Stadium, Glasgow
Attendance: 4,193
Referee: Leighton Hodges (Wales)

19 January 2013
14:35

(1 BP) Castres Olympique (France)	8–9	(Ireland) Ulster
Try: Lamerat 8' m Pen: Kockott (1/2) 18'	Report	Pen: Pienaar (3/5) 11', 35', 63'

Stade Pierre-Antoine, Castres
Attendance: 7,632
Referee: Nigel Owens (Wales)

=== Pool 5 ===
Team	P	W	D	L	PF	PA	Diff	TF	TA	TB	LB	Pts
(France) Clermont (2)	6	6	0	0	213	64	+149	23	3	4	0	28
(Ireland) Leinster	6	4	0	2	124	96	+28	12	5	2	2	20
(England) Exeter Chiefs	6	2	0	4	93	166	−73	6	19	0	1	9
(Wales) Scarlets	6	0	0	6	79	183	−104	6	20	0	2	2

13 October 2012
16:40

(1 BP) Clermont (France)	49–16	(Wales) Scarlets
Try: Sivivatu 31' c penalty try 41' c Byrne 47' c Chouly 53' c Bonnaire 70' m Nalaga 79' c Con: Parra (4/5); James (1/1); Pen: Parra (3/3) 7', 16', 38'	Report	Try: J. Davies 3' c Con: Priestland (1/1); Pen: Priestland (2/2) 19', 46'; Drop: Priestland (1/1) 21'

Stade Marcel-Michelin, Clermont-Ferrand
Attendance: 17,520
Referee: Peter Fitzgibbon (Ireland)

13 October 2012
15:40

Leinster (Ireland)	9–6	(England) Exeter Chiefs (1 BP)
Pen: J. Sexton (3/5) 10', 53', 73'	Report	Pen: Steenson (2/4) 39', 64'

RDS Arena, Dublin
Attendance: 18,500
Referee: Pascal Gaüzère (France)

20 October 2012
13:35

(1 BP) Scarlets (Wales)	13–20	(Ireland) Leinster
Try: Maule 53' c Con: Priestland (1/1); Pen: Priestland (2/5) 47', 74'	Report	Try: Nacewa 10' m Pen: J. Sexton (4/6) 1', 19', 57', 72'; Drop: J. Sexton (1/1) 43'

Parc y Scarlets, Llanelli
Attendance: 9,555
Referee: Greg Garner (England)

20 October 2012
18:00

Exeter Chiefs (England)	12–46	(France) Clermont (1 BP)
Pen: Steenson (4/4) 2', 9', 25', 31'	Report	Try: Nalaga (2) 17' c, 80' c Fofana (2) 48' c, 73' c Bonnaire 51' m Sivivatu 71' c Con: Parra (3/4); Skrela (2/2); Pen: Parra (2/3) 36', 45'

Sandy Park, Exeter
Attendance: 9,819
Referee: John Lacey (Ireland)

8 December 2012
13:35

(1 BP) Scarlets (Wales)	16–22	(England) Exeter Chiefs
Try: penalty try 66' c Con: Thomas (1/1); Pen: Priestland (2/3) 7', 30'; Thomas (1/1) 55'	Report	Try: Thomas 4'; Con: Steenson (1/1); Pen: Steenson (5/5) 11', 22', 35', 48', 58'

Parc y Scarlets, Llanelli
Attendance: 7,512
Referee: Mathieu Raynal (France)

9 December 2012
16:00

Clermont (France)	15–12	(Ireland) Leinster (1 BP)
Pen: Parra (4/4) 3', 18', 23', 34'; Drop: James (1/1) 39'	Report	Pen: J. Sexton (4/5) 6', 27', 32', 53'

Stade Marcel-Michelin, Clermont-Ferrand
Attendance: 17,760
Referee: Nigel Owens (Wales)

15 December 2012
15:40

Exeter Chiefs (England)	30–20	(Wales) Scarlets
Try: Whitten 3' c Alcott 15' c Scaysbrook 78' c Con: Steenson (3/3); Pen: Steenson (3/5) 7', 39', 61'	Report	Try: Owens 34' c S. Williams 42' c Con: Thomas (2/2); Pen: Thomas (2/3) 10', 24'

Sandy Park, Exeter
Attendance: 9,258
Referee: Romain Poite (France)

15 December 2012
15:40

(1 BP) Leinster (Ireland)	21–28	(France) Clermont
Try: Jennings 65' c McFadden 78' m Con: J. Sexton (1/2); Pen: J. Sexton (3/4) 17', 25', 46'	Report	Try: Fofana 34' c Con: Parra (1/1); Pen: Parra (7/8) 7', 19', 31', 43', 51', 62', 69'

Aviva Stadium, Dublin
Attendance: 48,964
Referee: Wayne Barnes (England)

12 January 2013
18:00

(1 BP) Leinster (Ireland)	33–14	(Wales) Scarlets
Try: Healy 7' c Jennings 23' m Fitzgerald 32' c R. Kearney 43' c Madigan 79' c Con: J. Sexton (3/4); Madigan (1/1)	Report	Try: Li. Williams 40' m Pen: Thomas (2/2) 3', 57'; Drop: Li. Williams (1/1) 11'

RDS Arena, Dublin
Attendance: 18,200
Referee: Jérôme Garcès (France)

12 January 2013
19:00

(1 BP) Clermont (France)	46–3	(England) Exeter Chiefs
Try: Fofana 12' c Buttin (2) 21' c, 73' c Chouly 60' c Skrela 69' c Nalaga 79' m Con: Parra (4/4); Skrela (1/2); Pen: Parra (2/2) 11', 16'	Report	Pen: Steenson (1/3) 24'

Stade Marcel-Michelin, Clermont-Ferrand
Attendance: 17,666
Referee: Nigel Owens (Wales)

19 January 2013
18:00

Exeter Chiefs (England)	20–29	(Ireland) Leinster (1 BP)
Try: Clark 16' c penalty try 32' c Con: Steenson (2/2); Pen: Steenson (2/2) 39', 69'	Report	Try: D'Arcy 3' c R. Kearney 27' m O'Driscoll 44' c Heaslip 52' c Con: J. Sexton (3/4); Pen: J. Sexton (1/1) 74'

Sandy Park, Exeter
Attendance: 10,198
Referee: Romain Poite (France)

19 January 2013
18:00

Scarlets (Wales)	0–29	(France) Clermont (1 BP)
	Report	Try: Nalaga 6' c Parra 16' c Stanley 36' c Rougerie 65' m Con: Parra (2/2); Skrela (1/2); Pen: Parra (1/1) 9'

Parc y Scarlets, Llanelli
Attendance: 7,167
Referee: Neil Paterson (Scotland)

=== Pool 6 ===
Team	P	W	D	L	PF	PA	Diff	TF	TA	TB	LB	Pts
(France) Toulon (4)	6	5	0	1	186	84	+102	23	8	3	0	23
(France) Montpellier (7)	6	5	0	1	168	109	+59	17	9	2	0	22
(Wales) Cardiff Blues	6	1	0	5	143	184	−41	12	20	1	1	6
(England) Sale Sharks	6	1	0	5	78	198	−120	7	22	0	0	4

14 October 2012
12:45

Sale Sharks (England)	34–33	(Wales) Cardiff Blues (1 BP)
Try: Cipriani 55' m Jennings 63' c Buckley 74' c Con: Miller (2/3); Pen: Macleod (4/4) 12', 26', 36', 40'; Miller (1/1) 77'	Report	Try: Cuthbert (3) 15' c, 18' c, 37' c Con: Halfpenny (3/3); Pen: Halfpenny (4/4) 2', 45', 59', 78'

Salford City Stadium, Salford
Attendance: 5,853
Referee: Jérôme Garcès (France)

14 October 2012
21:00

(1 BP) Toulon (France)	37–16	(France) Montpellier
Try: Gunther 15' m Botha 30' c D. Armitage (2) 46' m, 65' c Bastareaud 77' c Con: Wilkinson (2/4); Giteau (1/1); Pen: Wilkinson (2/2) 9', 37'	Report	Try: Gorgodze 71' c Con: Paillaugue (1/1); Pen: Perraux (2/2) 7', 44'; Paillaugue (1/1) 60'

Stade Mayol, Toulon
Attendance: 12,547
Referee: Wayne Barnes (England)

21 October 2012
12:45

Cardiff Blues (Wales)	14–22	(France) Toulon
Try: Halfpenny 1' m Pen: Halfpenny (3/5) 38', 61', 73'	Report	Try: S. Armitage 63' c Con: Wilkinson (1/1); Pen: Wilkinson (5/6) 10', 14', 41', 55', 75'

Arms Park, Cardiff
Attendance: 9,624
Referee: George Clancy (Ireland)

21 October 2012
16:00

Montpellier (France)	33–18	(England) Sale Sharks
Try: Trinh-Duc 49' c Nagusa 55' c Tomas 59' c Con: Bustos Moyano (3/3); Pen: Bustos Moyano (4/5) 6', 14', 20', 34'	Report	Try: Cueto 3' m Vernon 74'; Con: Miller (1/2); Pen: Miller (2/3) 26', 43'

Stade Yves-du-Manoir, Montpellier
Attendance: 10,414
Referee: Neil Paterson (Scotland)

8 December 2012
15:40

Sale Sharks (England)	6–17	(France) Toulon
Pen: Cipriani (2/4) 7', 33'	Report	Try: Smith 29' m Pen: Wilkinson (4/6) 16', 36', 51', 75'

Salford City Stadium, Salford
Attendance: 9,154
Referee: Leighton Hodges (Wales)

9 December 2012
12:45

Cardiff Blues (Wales)	24–35	(France) Montpellier
Pen: Patchell (7/8) 2', 12', 22', 34', 42', 68', 70'; Drop: Patchell (1/2) 27'	Report	Try: Audrin 30' c Gorgodze 64' m Nagusa 78' m Con: Paillaugue (1/3); Pen: Paillaugue (6/7) 9', 15', 25', 38', 63', 73'

Arms Park, Cardiff
Attendance: 6,014
Referee: John Lacey (Ireland)

15 December 2012
19:00

(1 BP) Montpellier (France)	34–21	(Wales) Cardiff Blues
Try: Nagusa 15' c Jansen van Vuuren 26' c Audrin 41' c Beattie 56' c Con: Bustos Moyano (4/4); Pen: Bustos Moyano (2/2) 7', 73'	Report	Try: Warburton 4' m Cuthbert 51' c Con: Patchell (1/2); Pen: Patchell (3/5) 10', 60', 67'

Stade Yves-du-Manoir, Montpellier
Attendance: 11,209
Referee: Greg Garner (England)

16 December 2012
16:00

(1 BP) Toulon (France)	62–0	(England) Sale Sharks
Try: Orioli 30' c Michalak 36' c Van Niekerk (2) 45' c, 66' c Kubriashvili 50' c S. Armitage 57' c D. Armitage 61' m Wulf 74' c Smith 79' m Con: Michalak (6/7); Wilkinson (1/2); Pen: Michalak (1/1) 5'	Report

Stade Mayol, Toulon
Attendance: 13,935
Referee: John Lacey (Ireland)

11 January 2013
20:00

Sale Sharks (England)	6–27	(France) Montpellier (1 BP)
Pen: Cipriani (2/2) 16', 36'	Report	Try: Artru 9' c Beattie 32' m Bérard 48' m penalty try 77' c Con: Paillaugue (1/3); Escande (1/1); Pen: Paillaugue (1/2) 46'

Salford City Stadium, Salford
Attendance: 6,088
Referee: Leighton Hodges (Wales)

12 January 2013
14:35

(1 BP) Toulon (France)	45–25	(Wales) Cardiff Blues (1 BP)
Try: Wulf 20' c Chiocci 26' c Orioli 35' m Mermoz 42' c Palisson 48' c Bastareaud 53' m Fresia 62' c Con: Wilkinson (4/6); Giteau (1/1)	Report	Try: Halfpenny (2) 17' m, 80' c Cuthbert 65' m Hewitt 78' m Con: Halfpenny (1/4); Pen: Halfpenny (1/1) 1'

Stade Mayol, Toulon
Attendance: 13,509
Referee: JP Doyle (England)

19 January 2013
15:40

Cardiff Blues (Wales)	26–14	(England) Sale Sharks
Try: L. Williams 44' c Paterson 73' c Con: Halfpenny (2/2); Pen: Halfpenny (4/6) 10', 25', 32', 80'	Report	Try: Taylor 3' c Croall 41' c Con: Miller (2/2)

Arms Park, Cardiff
Attendance: 7,473
Referee: Peter Fitzgibbon (Ireland)

19 January 2013
16:40

Montpellier (France)	23–3	(France) Toulon
Try: Combezou 8' c Paillaugue 46' c Con: Paillaugue (2/2); Pen: Paillaugue (3/3) 15', 19', 22'	Report	Pen: Wilkinson (1/2) 4'

Stade Yves-du-Manoir, Montpellier
Attendance: 14,370
Referee: Alain Rolland (Ireland)

== See also ==
- 2012–13 Heineken Cup
