= Padro =

Padro or Padró may refer to:

- Gonzalo Padro (born 1983), Argentine-born Italian rugby union player
- Tomàs Padró (1840–1877), Catalan painter, graphic artist, and illustrator
- Monte Padro, a 2,389 metres mountain in the department of Haute-Corse on the island of Corsica, France
