= Ben Williams (rugby union, born 1989) =

English rugby union player

- Born: Ben Williams; 28 May 1989 (age 37) Poole, England
- Height: 1.88 m (6 ft 2 in)
- Weight: 101 kg (223 lb; 15 st 13 lb)

Rugby union career
- Position: Centre
Senior career
Years	Team	Apps	(Points)
2009–15	Bath	37	(25)
- Correct as of 9 March 2014

Ben Williams (born 28 May 1989 in Poole, England) is a former English professional rugby union player. He plays at centre for Bath. He was forced to retire in 2015 due to an ongoing shoulder problem.
