= Neil Clark (rugby union) =

English rugby union player

- Born: 8 October 1981 (age 45) London, England
- Height: 1.78 m (5 ft 10 in)
- Weight: 107 kg (16 st 12 lb)

Rugby union career
- Position: Hooker
Senior career
Years	Team	Apps	(Points)
1999-2003	Exeter		
2003-2007	Bristol		
2007	Cornish All Blacks		
- Bath
2007	Cornish All Blacks		
2007-2008	Exeter Chiefs		
- Oyonnax

Neil Clark (born 8 October 1981) is an English former rugby union player. His position of choice was hooker.

== Rugby career ==
Clark first played rugby for the youth sides at Helston RFC, before moving joining the Exeter Chiefs. Clark made his debut for Exeter on 9 October 1999 at the age of 18 as a substitute against Orrell R.U.F.C. He made his full debut two seasons later against Bedford and made a handful of starts, before dropping back out of regular first team contention for the next couple of seasons.

In 2003, Clark moved to Bristol Shoguns. In his second season with the club he scored the winning try in the penultimate match against Orrell that saw Bristol promoted to the Premiership. Clark injured his anterior cruciate ligament in pre-season training before the 2006-07 season and was released by Bristol in February 2007 during his rehabilitation.

Towards the end of the season, Clark moved to Cornish All Blacks and made several appearances in their successful push for promotion from National Division Two, scoring the final try of the season against Cambridge R.U.F.C. Clark began the 2007-08 season at Bath Rugby, where he provided squad cover during the 2007 Rugby World Cup. He returned to Cornish All Blacks in December for the remainder of the season, in which the club was relegated back to National Division Two.

Clark returned to Exeter, now rebranded the Exeter Chiefs, for the 2008-09 season. He scored a try in the opening match of the season at Esher RFC, but a broken ankle in a later match brought the season to a premature end. However, Clark played a full role in Exeter’s following season, in which the club were promoted from the RFU Championship into the Premiership, and was voted Players’ Player of the Season.

Clark when then included in the England squad. Clark played a role in Exeter’s first three Premiership seasons, sometimes as starting hooker, sometimes from the substitute bench. The final Premiership match of the 2011-12 season saw Clark make his 150th appearance for the club.

It was announced on 23 April 2013 that Clark would join newly promoted French side Oyonnax. After helping Oyonnax survive in the Top 14 in his first season with the club, Clark suffered a neck injury and was forced to announce his retirement from the sport in November 2014.
