= Sébastien Descons =

French rugby union player

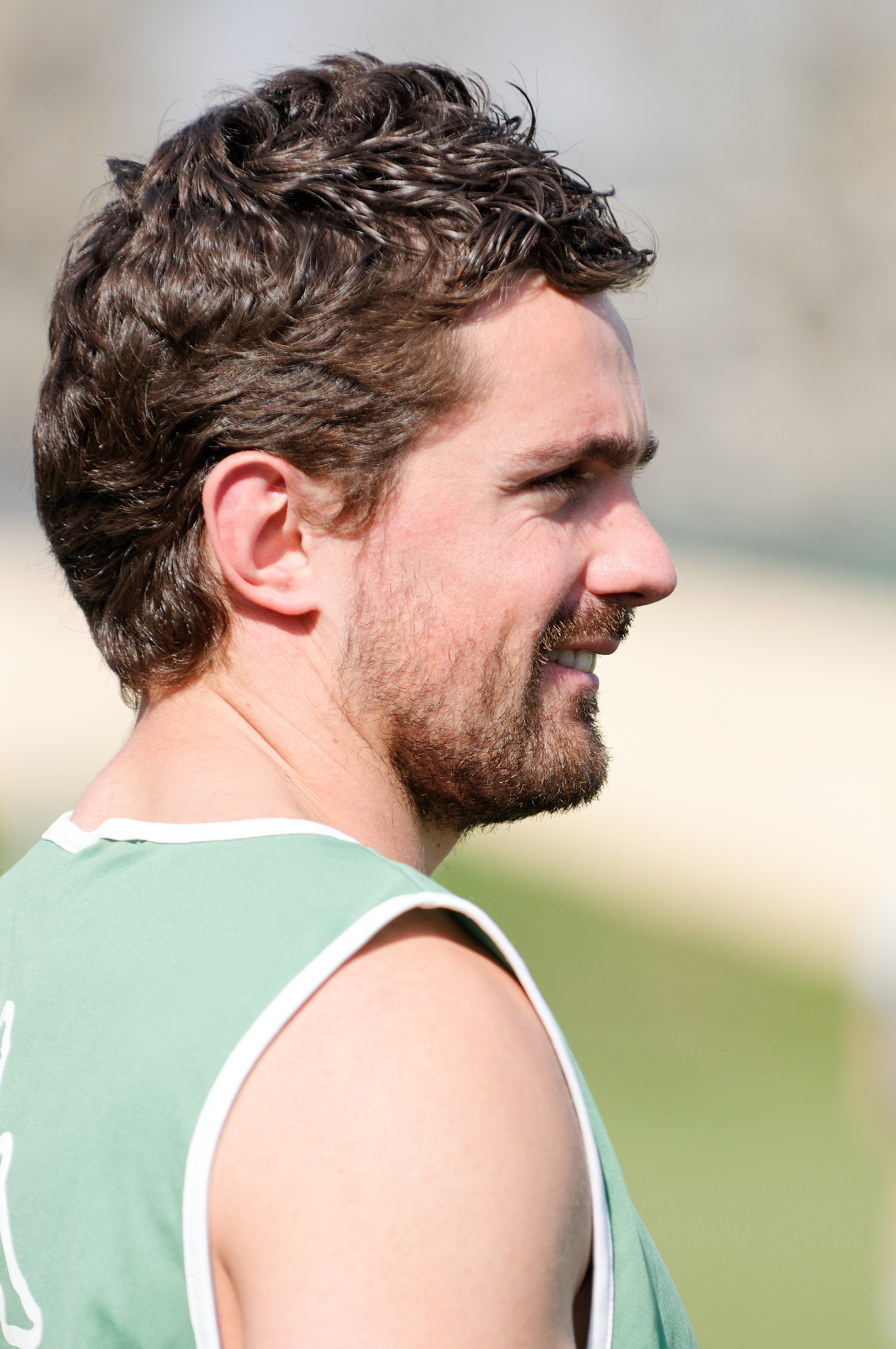
- Born: 13 May 1983 (age 43) Saverdun, France
- Height: 1.73 m (5 ft 8 in)
- Weight: 83 kg (13 st 1 lb)

Rugby union career
- Position: Scrum-half
Senior career
Years	Team	Apps	(Points)
2004–2006	USA Perpignan	7	(10)
2006–2011	Section Paloise	111	(351)
2011–2013	Racing Métro	52	(94)
- Correct as of 5 November 2012

Sébastien Descons (born 13 May 1983) is a French rugby union player. His position is Scrum-half and he currently plays for Racing Métro 92 in the Top 14. He began his career with USA Perpignan, playing just seven games in two seasons before dropping down to Section Paloise in the Pro D2. He joined Racing Métro in 2011.
