= Pierre Bérard =

French rugby union player

Pierre Berard
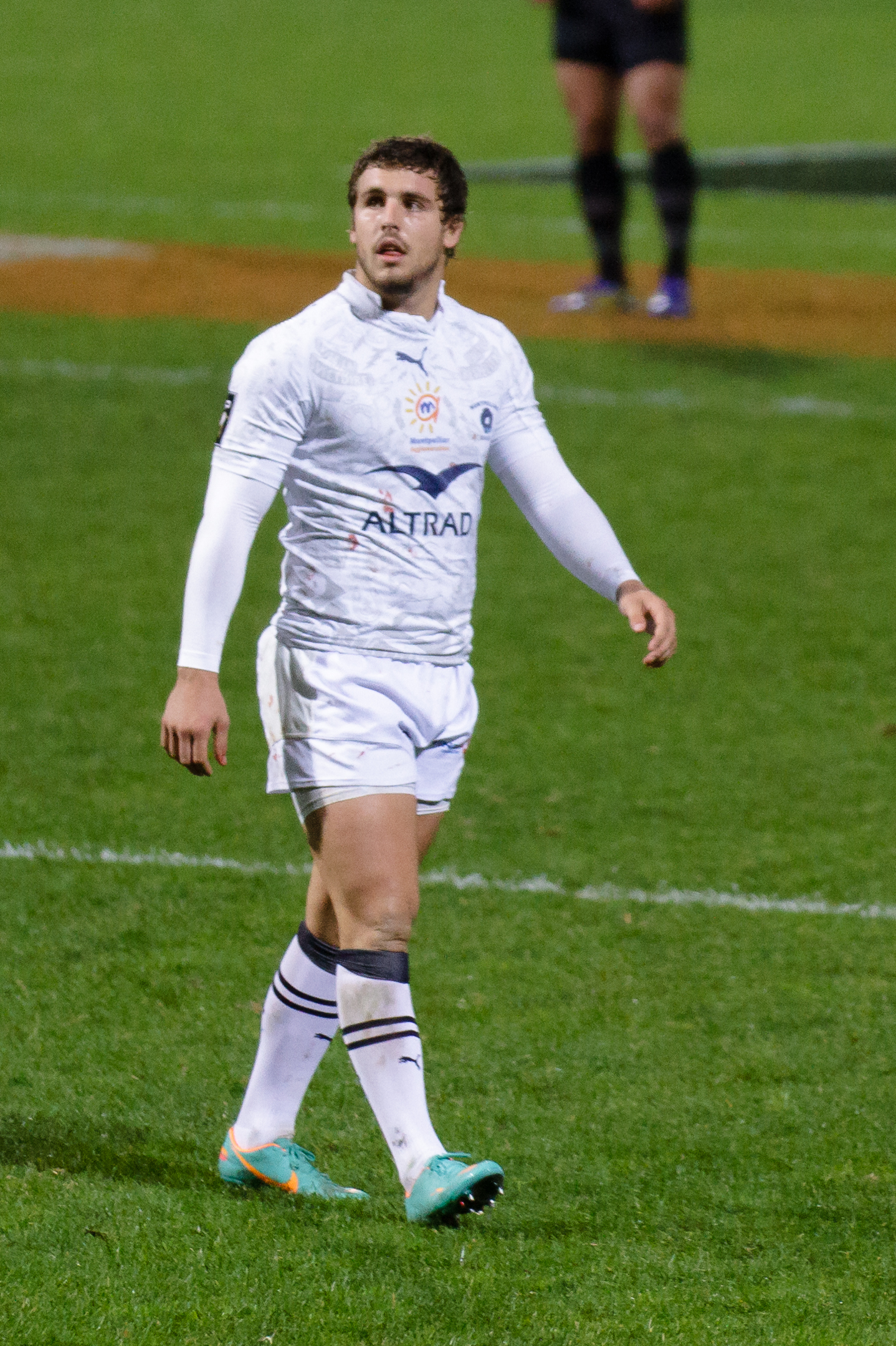
- Born: 23 May 1991 (age 35) France
- Height: 1.86 m (6 ft 1 in)
- Weight: 96 kg (15 st 2 lb)

Rugby union career
- Position: Wing
Senior career
| Years | Team | Apps | (Points) |
| 2010–2015 | Montpellier Hérault | 63 | (40) |
| 2015-2016 | Stade Rochelais | 7 | (5) |
| 2016- | Castres olympique | 13 | (10) |
- Correct as of 19 November 2012

Pierre Bérard (born 23 May 1991) is a French rugby union player. His plays on the wing for Castres olympique in the Top 14.
