= Peter Fitzgibbon =

Irish international rugby union referee

- Born: 9 March 1975 (age 51) Limerick, Ireland

Rugby union career
- Position: -
Amateur team(s)
Years	Team	Apps	(Points)
-	Thomond		
Refereeing career
Years	Competition		Apps
- Test Matches
2007–	Heineken Cup		26
2006–	European Challenge Cup		14
–	Pro12		
–	All-Ireland League		
- Correct as of 10 January 2014

Peter Fitzgibbon is an Irish international rugby union referee. He has been on the IRB Elite panel (the highest level in the world) since 2009. He works full-time for the Irish Rugby Football Union as referee development officer in the Leisure Rugby department, which deals with casual play and the IRFU's tag rugby events. He is a member of the Munster Association of Referees. and also played rugby for Thomond RFC.
