= Romain Teulet =

French rugby union player (born 1978)

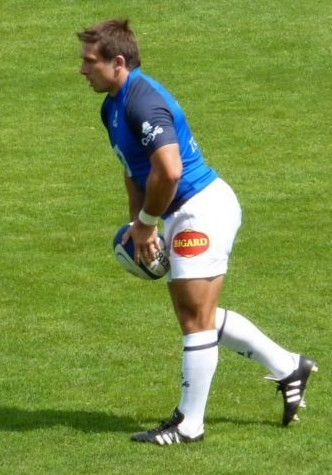
- Born: February 5, 1978 (age 48) Bergerac, France
- Height: 1.65 m (5 ft 5 in)
- Weight: 75 kg (11 st 11 lb)

Rugby union career
- Position(s): Full back, scrum-half, fly-half
Amateur team(s)
Years	Team	Apps	(Points)
1997–2001	Bergerac		
- Correct as of April 18, 2010
Senior career
Years	Team	Apps	(Points)
2001–2014	Castres	172	(2909)
- Correct as of 27 April 2014
Coaching career
- Years: Team
- 2014–2015: France (kicking)
- 2016–2019: Castres (kicking and skills)
- 2019–: Bergerac (manager)
- Correct as of 7 June 2022

Romain Teulet (born February 5, 1978, in Bergerac, Dordogne) is a French rugby union player, who played for Top 14 team Castres Olympique.

Nicknamed Robocop for his unusual preparation and high success rate for penalty kicks, and le petit lutin (the gnome) for his small size, he left his hometown club US Bergerac where he had been playing since the age of 11 for Castres Olympique in 2001. He quickly established himself as a top-class kicker, even scoring 35 placed kicks in a row during the 2004–05 season, a record that stood until March 2009, when Brock James failed only on his 42nd attempt. He also was the top point scorer in the 2009–10 Top 14 season with 263 points. On August 28, 2010, he reached the 2000-point mark in the French championship in a game against Bayonne, scoring 20 points in the 25–16 win.

On 15 April 2014, Teulet announced that after 13 years with Castres, he would retire at the end of the 2013–14 Top 14 season. On this announcement, the French national team's head coach Philippe Saint-André, announced that Romain Teulet will join the national team as a specialist kicking coach.

== Honours ==
Castres Olympique

- European Shield: 2003
- Challenge Yves du Manoir: 2004
- Top 14: 2012–13
