= Gaëtan Germain =

French rugby union player (born 1990)

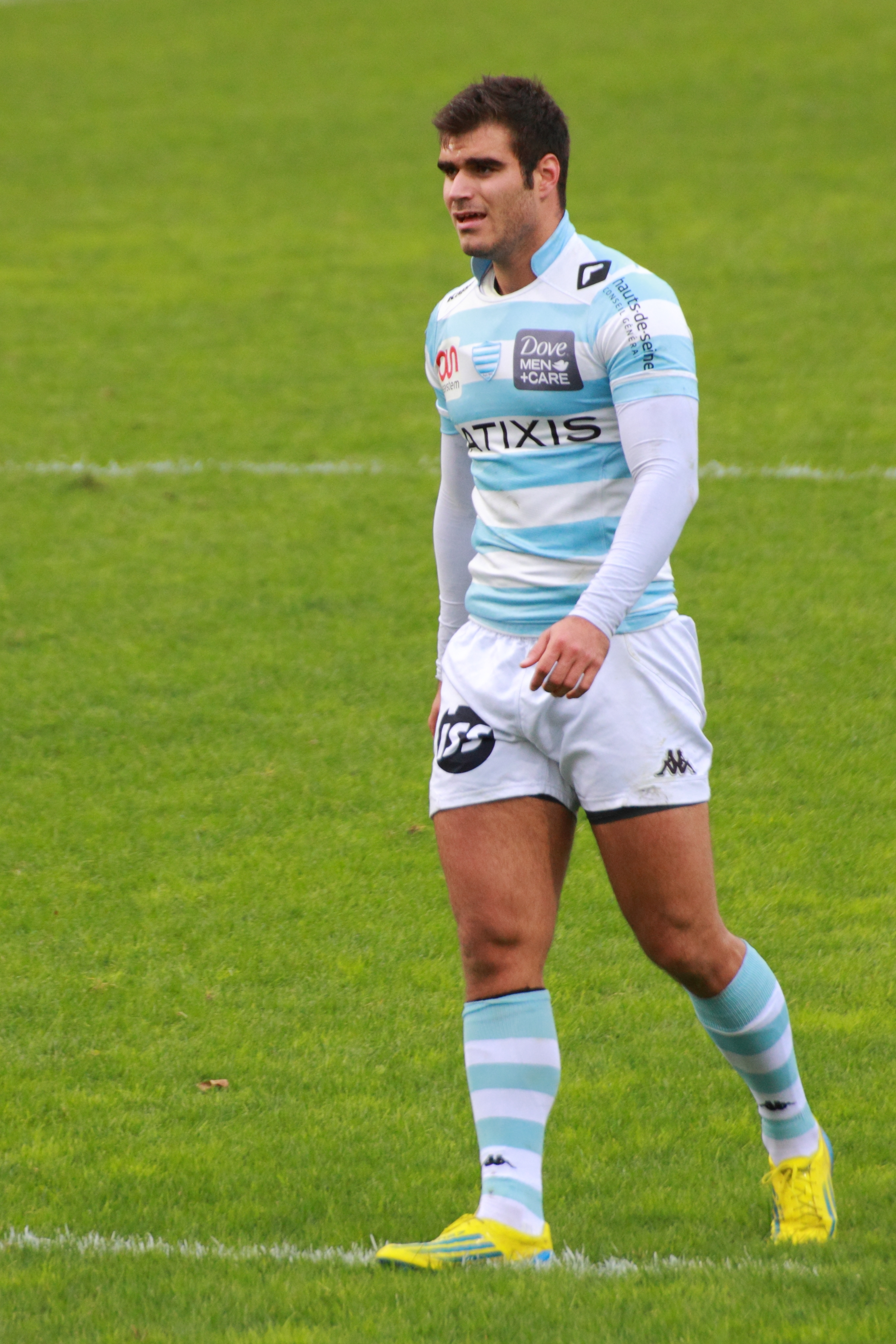
- Born: 2 July 1990 (age 36) Romans-sur-Isère, France
- Height: 1.90 m (6 ft 3 in)
- Weight: 96 kg (15 st 2 lb)

Rugby union career
- Position: Full-back
Senior career
Years	Team	Apps	(Points)
2010–2011	Bourgoin	6	(47)
2011–2013	Racing 92	26	(148)
2013–2018	Brive	125	(1,434)
2018–2020	Grenoble	28	(330)
2020–2025	Bayonne	57	(682)

Gaëtan Germain (born 2 July 1990) is a French former rugby union player.

== Honours & Achievements ==
Personal

- Top 14 top points scorer (3): 2013–14, 2015–16, 2016–17
