= Yoan Audrin =

French rugby union player

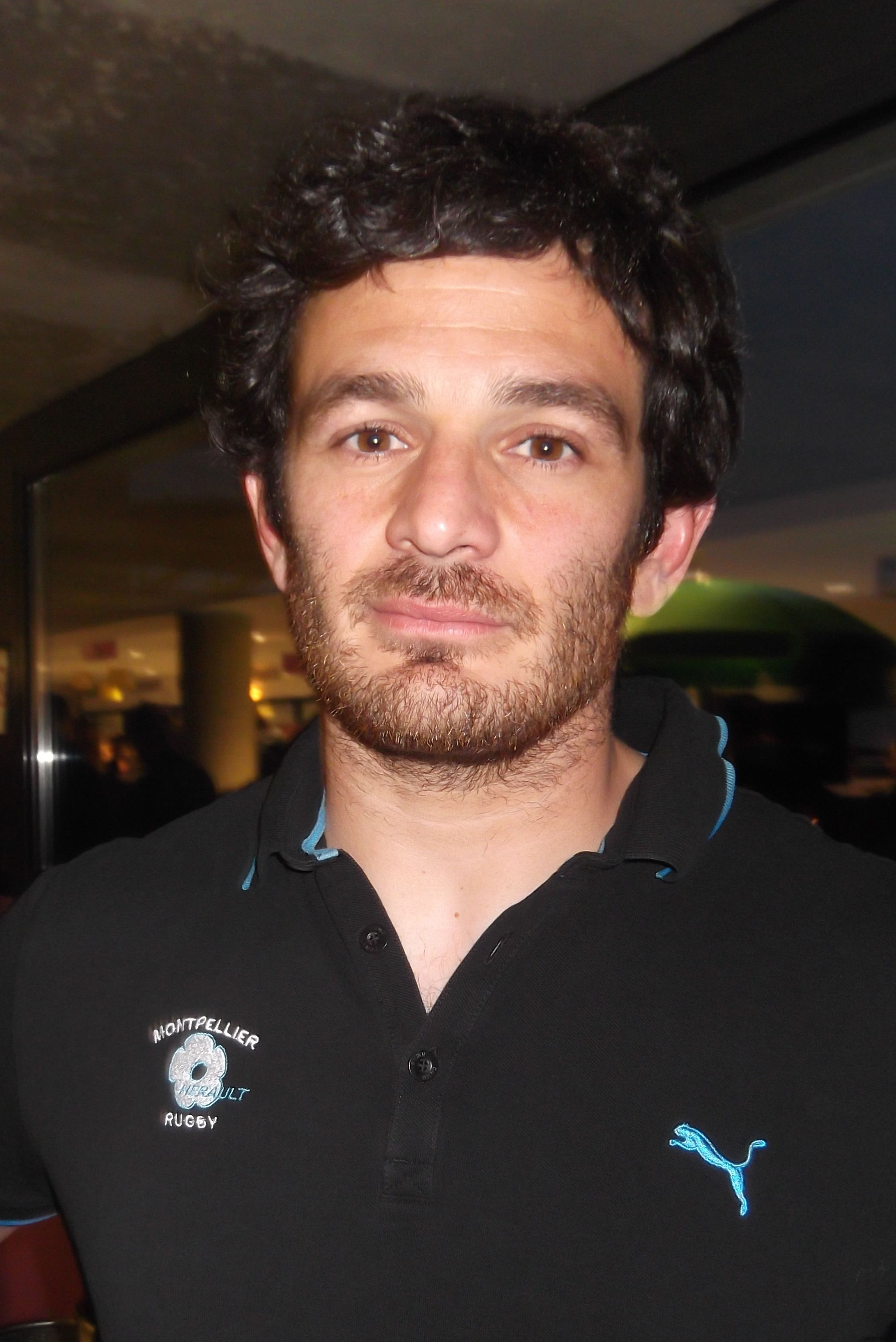
- Born: 14 August 1981 (age 45) Pézenas, France
- Height: 1.79 m (5 ft 10 1/2 in)
- Weight: 80 kg (12 st 8 lb; 176 lb)

Rugby union career
- Position(s): centre, wing
Senior career
Years	Team	Apps	(Points)
2002–2006	Béziers Hérault	72	(120)
2006–2007	Bayonne	24	(35)
2007–2009	Montauban	49	(70)
2009–2011	Castres	52	(50)
2011–2014	Montpellier	55	(55)
2014-	Racing Métro	14	(5)
- Correct as of 31 January 2015

Yoan Audrin (born 14 August 1981) is a French rugby union player. His position is centre or wing and he currently plays for Montpellier Hérault in the Top 14. He began his career with Béziers before moving to Bayonne in 2006, then had spells with Montauban and Castres before moving to Montpellier in 2011.
