= Julien Peyrelongue =

French rugby union player (born 1981)

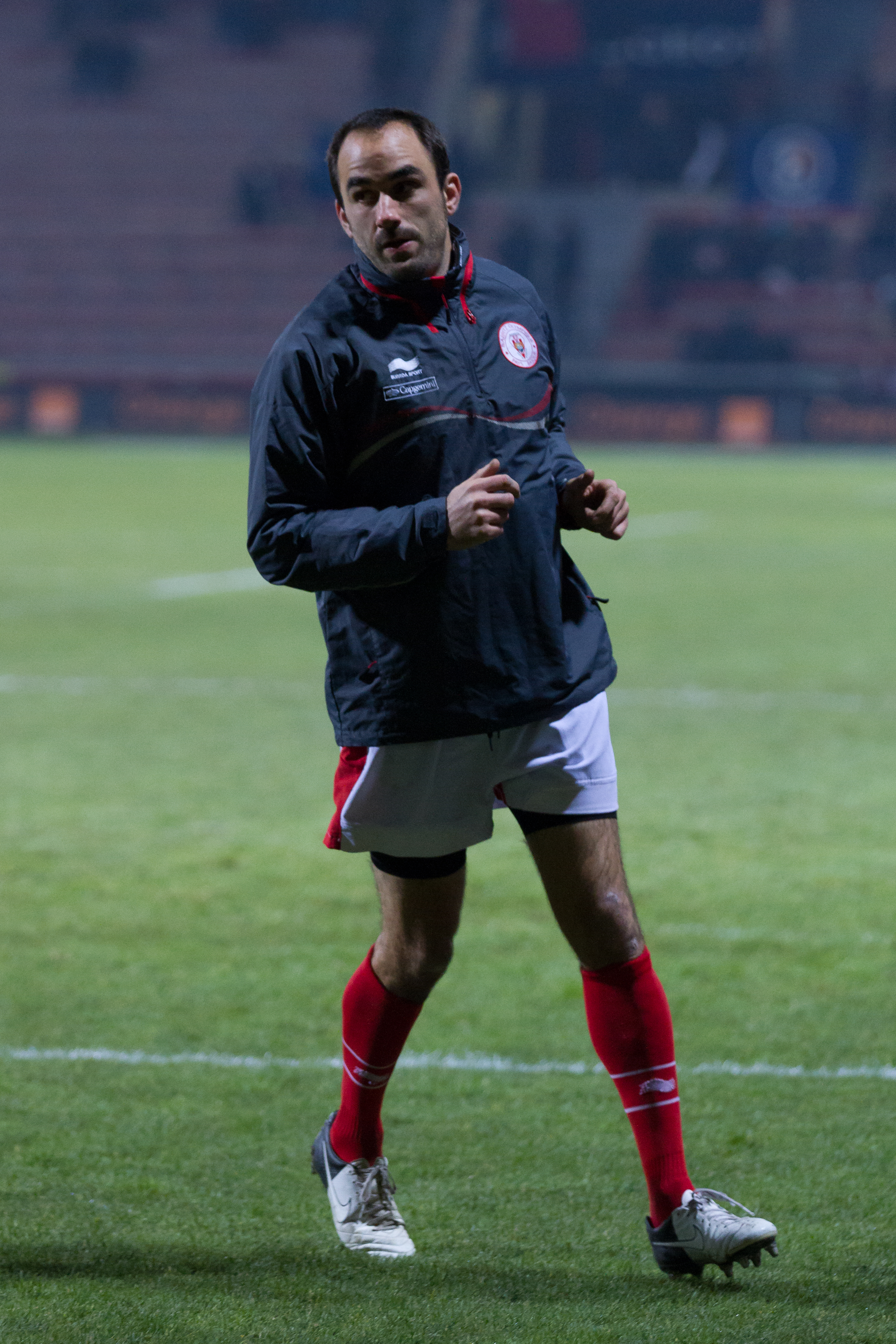
- Born: Julien Peyrelongue; 2 April 1981 (age 45) Bayonne, France
- Height: 1.88 m (6 ft 2 in)
- Weight: 86 kg (13 st 8 lb)

Rugby union career
- Position: Fly-half
Amateur team(s)
Years	Team	Apps	(Points)
- Peyrehorade
Senior career
Years	Team	Apps	(Points)
2001–2014	Biarritz	361	(608)
2014–2016	Dax	47	(55)
International career
Years	Team	Apps	(Points)
2004	France	6	(3)

Julien Peyrelongue (born 2 April 1981) is a former French rugby union fly-half who played most of his career with Biarritz.

== Club career ==
Having spent his youth years at Peyrehorade, Peyrelongue left in 2000 for Biarritz, where he spent his entire professional career. He won two French championships in 2005 and 2006 and reached the final of the Heineken Cup twice in 2006 and 2010.

== International career ==
Peyrelongue made his international debut on 21 February 2004 in the Six Nations Championship match against Italy in a game that he played in its entirety alongside his Biarritz teammate Dimitri Yachvili. He also played the second half of France's game against Scotland, helping France to their second Grand Slam in three years. He played four more games in 2004, against Canada during France's summer tour and all three games during the autumn internationals, but was never called up again afterwards.

== Honours ==
- Biarritz Olympique
  - Top 14 (2002, 2005, 2006)
- France
  - Grand Slam (2004)
