= Gonzalo Padro =

- Born: 13 June 1983 (age 43) Tucumán, Argentina
- Height: 196 cm (6 ft 5 in)
- Weight: 110 kg (243 lb)

Rugby union career
- Position(s): Lock, No.8
- Current team: Viadana
Senior career
Years	Team	Apps	(Points)
2004-2005	Rugby Rovigo		
2005-2007	Biarritz		
2007-2010	Petrarca Padova		
2010-2012	Treviso	32	(25)
2012-	Viadana		
International career
Years	Team	Apps	(Points)
- Italy A

Gonzalo Padro (born 13 June 1983 in Tucumán, Argentina) is an Argentine-born Italian rugby union player. He plays as a lock and as a number eight.

Padro previously played for Rugby Rovigo, Biarritz Olympique, Petrarca Padova and Benetton Treviso. Gonzalo plays in the back or second row.

In 2007 Gonzalo won the Top 14 with Biarritz. He joined Benetton Treviso for the 2010–2011 season. He signed for new Italian club Viadana for the 2012/13 season.
