= Kris Burton =

Italy international rugby union player

Kristopher Burton
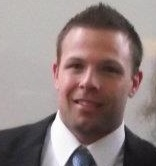
- Born: Kristopher Shaun Burton; 4 August 1980 (age 46) Brisbane, Queensland, Australia
- Height: 1.77 m (5 ft 9 1/2 in)
- Weight: 87 kg (13 st 10 lb; 192 lb)

Rugby union career
- Position(s): Fly-half, Fullback
Senior career
Years	Team	Apps	(Points)
2006–08	Orléans	34	(322)
2008–10	Prato	18	(65)
2010–13	Treviso	55	(403)
2013–14	NG Dragons	15	(62)
International career
Years	Team	Apps	(Points)
2007–13	Italy	21	(87)

Kristopher Shaun Burton (born 4 August 1980) is an Australian-born Italian international rugby union player. His regular playing positions are Fly-half and Fullback.

Burton plays as a fly-half but can also turn out in the fullback position.

Burton qualifies to play for Italy through his mother, and made his debut for Italy against Uruguay on 2 June 2007. He has not represented Italy in the Rugby World Cup tournament, but has played in the three Six Nations Championships, in 2011, 2012 & 2013.

On 9 April 2013, it was confirmed that Burton would be moving from Treviso to Newport Gwent Dragons for the 2013–14 season.

On 7 May 2013, Burton announced that he would be retiring from International rugby. Burton left the Dragons in July 2014.
