= Martín Bustos Moyano =

Argentine rugby union player (born 1985)

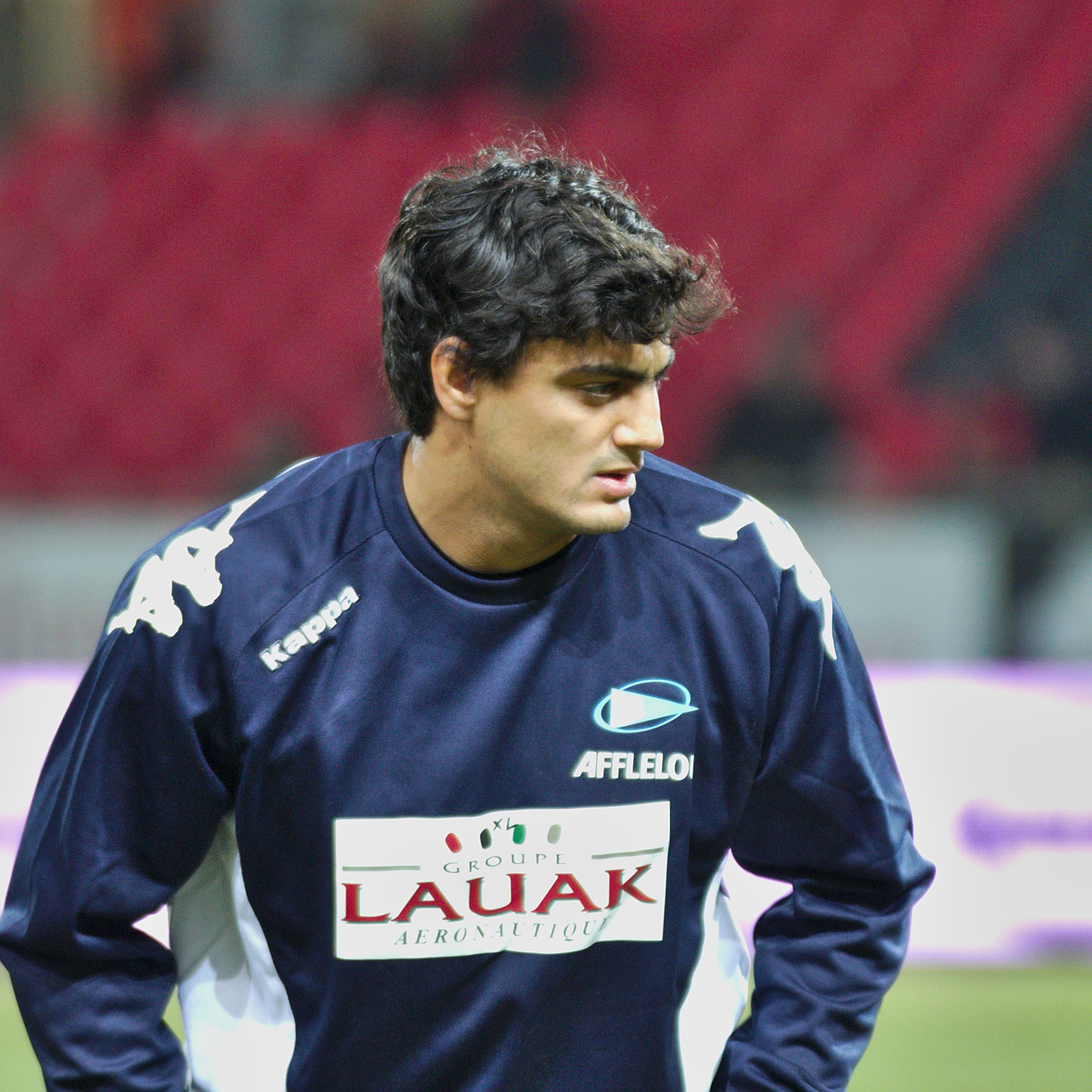
- Born: Martín Bustos Moyano; July 12, 1985 (age 41) Córdoba, Argentina
- Height: 6 ft 1 in (1.85 m)
- Weight: 82 kg (12 st 13 lb)

Rugby union career
- Position: Fullback / Wing / Centre
Senior career
Years	Team	Apps	(Points)
2010	Pampas XV	5	(31)
2010–2013	Montpellier	71	(700)
2013–2019	Bayonne	121	(963)
- Correct as of 3 September 2017
International career
Years	Team	Apps	(Points)
2008–	Argentina	4	(43)
- Correct as of 24 June 2013
National sevens team
Years	Team		Comps
- Argentina 7s

Martín Bustos Moyano (born July 12, 1985, in Córdoba, Argentina) is an Argentine rugby union player, previously with the French Top 14 club Montpellier and in the Pro D2 for Bayonne. He plays in both the fullback and wing positions. In May 2010 he was selected in a squad of over 40 players to represent Argentina in the two-test Summer tour of Argentina.

== See also ==
- 2009 Americas Rugby Championship season
