= Arnaud Héguy =

French rugby union player (born 1985)

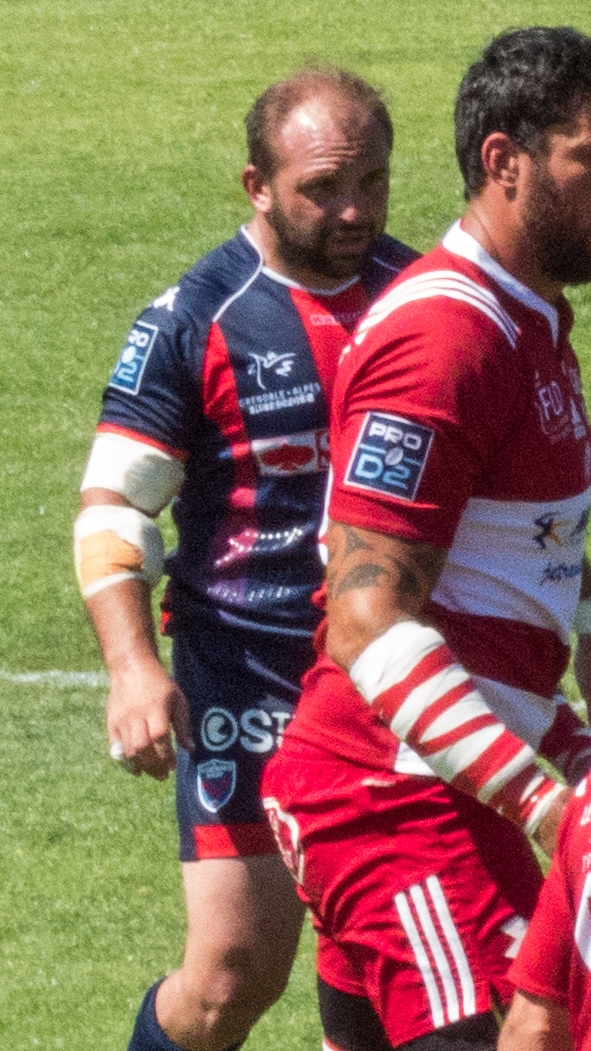
- Born: 23 January 1985 (age 41) Bayonne
- Height: 1.74 m (5 ft 9 in)
- Weight: 94 kg (14 st 11 lb)

Rugby union career
- Position: Hooker
Senior career
Years	Team	Apps	(Points)
2005-2011	Bayonne	131	(60)
2011-2014	Biarritz Olympique	77	(50)
2014-2018	FC Grenoble	78	(70)
2018-2019	US Dax	13	(20)
2019	Angoulême	11	(10)
International career
Years	Team	Apps	(Points)
2005	France	1	(0)

Arnaud Héguy (born 23 January 1985) is a former French international professional rugby union player.

As a Hooker, Héguy played for Aviron Bayonnais, a club based in his hometown of Bayonne. In 2011, he transferred to Biarritz Olympique.
