= Yannick Caballero =

France international rugby union player

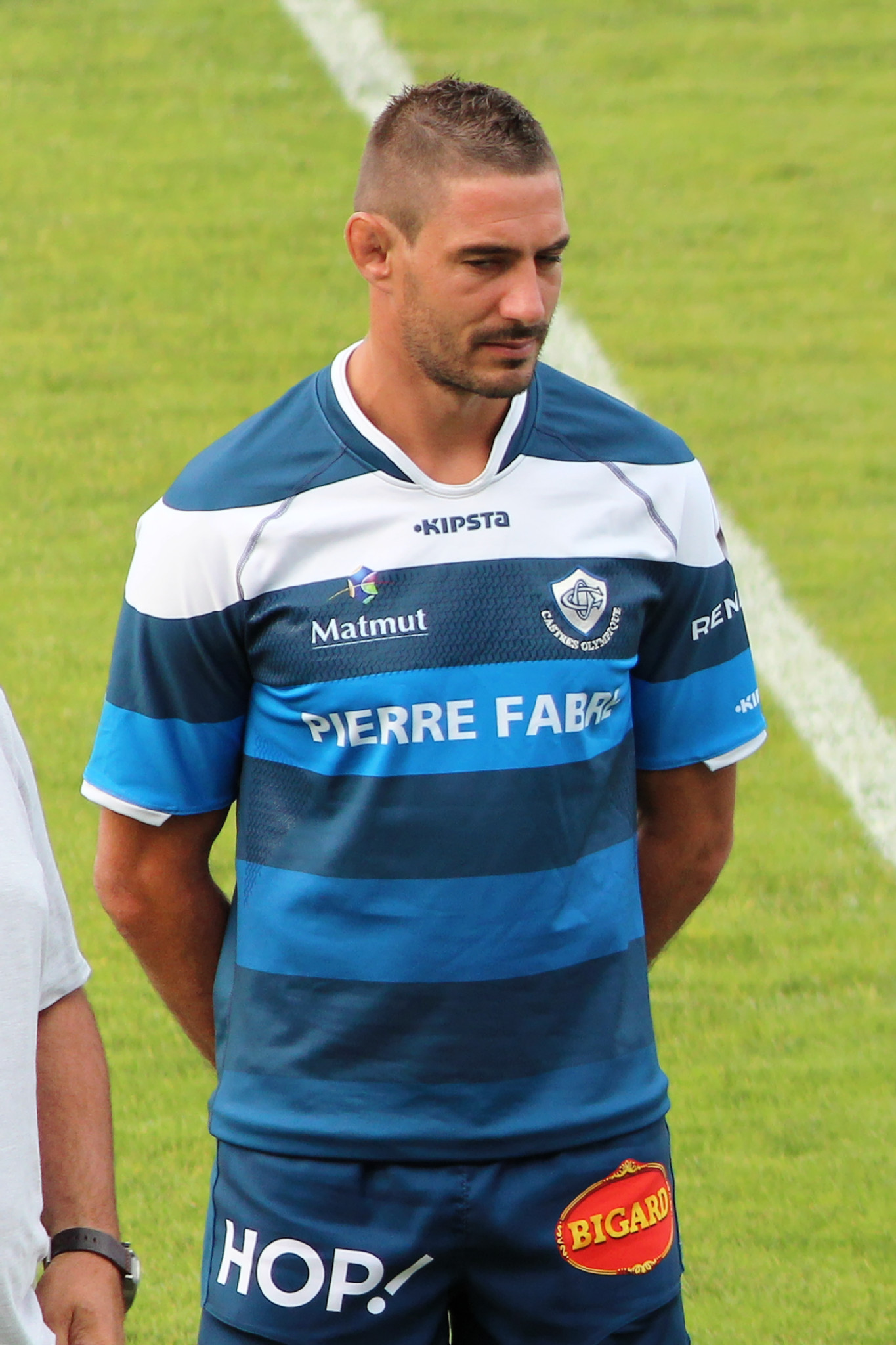
- Born: April 3, 1983 (age 43) Castres
- Height: 1.92 m (6 ft 4 in)
- Weight: 92 kg (14 st 7 lb)

Rugby union career
- Position: Flanker
Senior career
Years	Team	Apps	(Points)
2004-2005	Castres	2	(0)
2005-2009	Montauban	101	(30)
2009-19	Castres	230	(40)
- Correct as of 9 December 2019
International career
Years	Team	Apps	(Points)
2008	France	1	(0)

Yannick Caballero (born April 3, 1983) is a French rugby union player, currently playing for the Top 14 team Castres Olympique. He has one cap for France, which he won in 2008 coming on as a replacement against Australia in Brisbane.

== Personal life ==
Caballero was born in France, and is of Spanish descent.

== Honours ==
=== Club ===
(France) Castres

- Top 14: 2012–13
