= Jean-Marc Doussain =

France international rugby union player

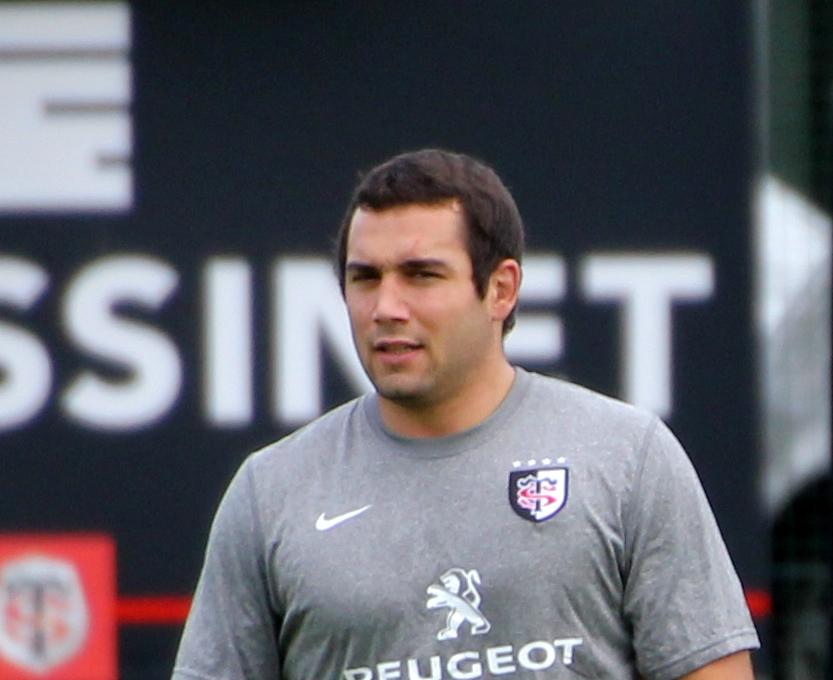
- Born: 12 February 1991 (age 35) Toulouse, France
- Height: 1.74 m (5 ft 9 in)
- Weight: 92 kg (14 st 7 lb; 203 lb)

Rugby union career
- Position(s): Fly-half, Scrum-half
Senior career
Years	Team	Apps	(Points)
2009–2018	Toulouse	208	(407)
2018–2024	Lyon	112	(263)
International career
Years	Team	Apps	(Points)
2011–2017	France	17	(41)

Jean-Marc Doussain (born 12 February 1991) is a former French rugby union fly half. He played club rugby for Toulouse and Lyon and appeared 17 times for the French national side. He made his debut for France with 5 minutes left of the 2011 Rugby World Cup final, becoming the first player ever to make his test debut in a Rugby World Cup final. Doussain was not initially named in the squad and was only called up as an injury replacement for David Skrela.

Doussain was born in Sainte-Croix-Volvestre and played for Saint-Girons rugby club before signing for Toulouse in 2007, at the age of 17. His father, Jean Doussain, was also a rugby player, having played at scrum-half for Stade Saint-Gaudinois in the 1980s. Doussain made his first full appearance for Toulouse on 28 November 2009, against Montauban. His current contract commits him to Toulouse until the end of the 2014 season.
