= Benoît Paillaugue =

French rugby union player

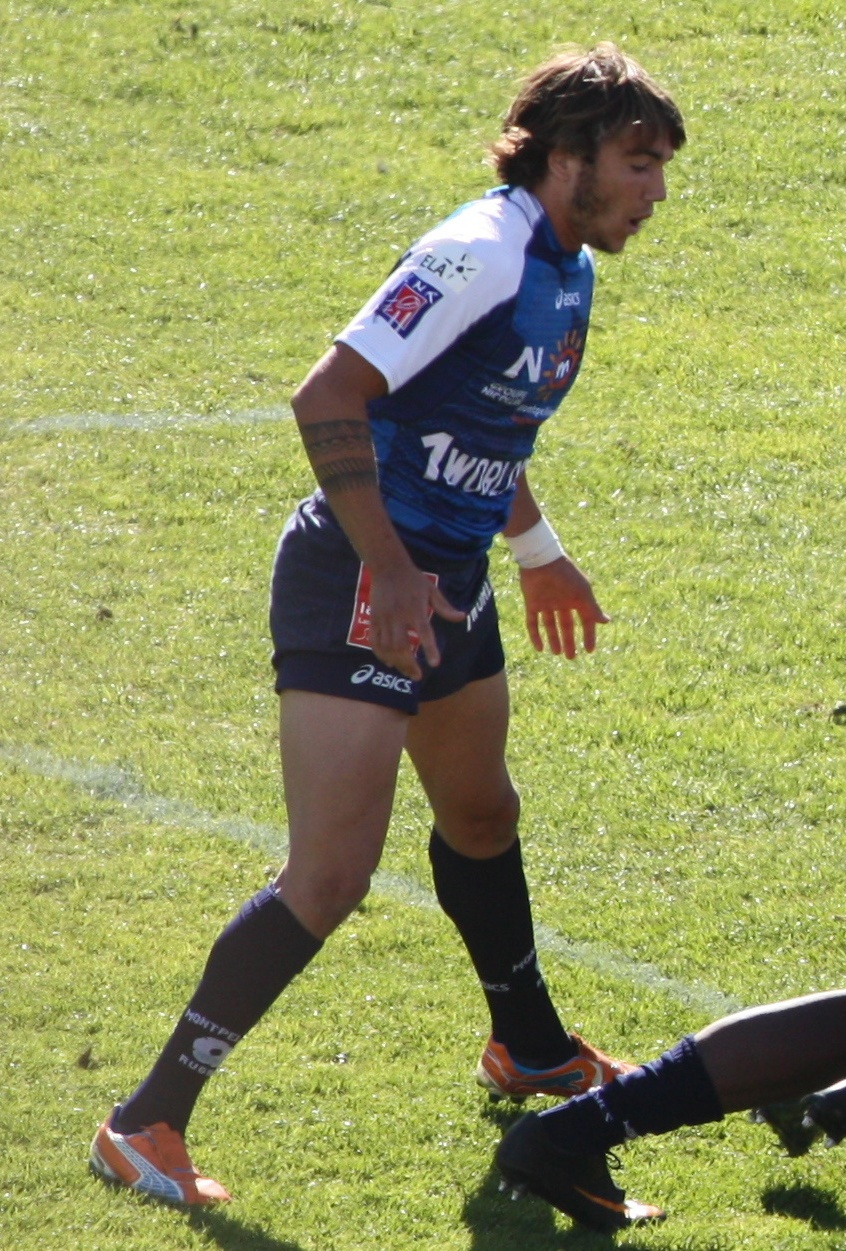
- Born: 17 November 1987 (age 38) La Rochelle, France
- Height: 1.72 m (5 ft 7 1/2 in)
- Weight: 74 kg (11 st 9 lb)

Rugby union career
- Position(s): Fly-half, Scrum-half
Senior career
Years	Team	Apps	(Points)
2007–2008	Stade Français	2	(0)
2008–2009	Auch	12	(62)
2009–2022	Montpellier	275	(1354)
2022–	Toulon	26	(72)
- Correct as of 11 September 2022

Benoît Paillaugue (born 17 November 1987) is a French rugby union player. His position is fly-half or scrum-half and he currently plays for Toulon in the Top 14. He began his professional career with Stade Français in 2008 playing only 2 games before moving to FC Auch Gers in the second division. After only six months with Auch he was signed by Montpellier Hérault in January 2009.

== Honours ==
- 2015–16 European Rugby Challenge Cup : winner.
