= Benoît Baby =

French rugby coach and former international player

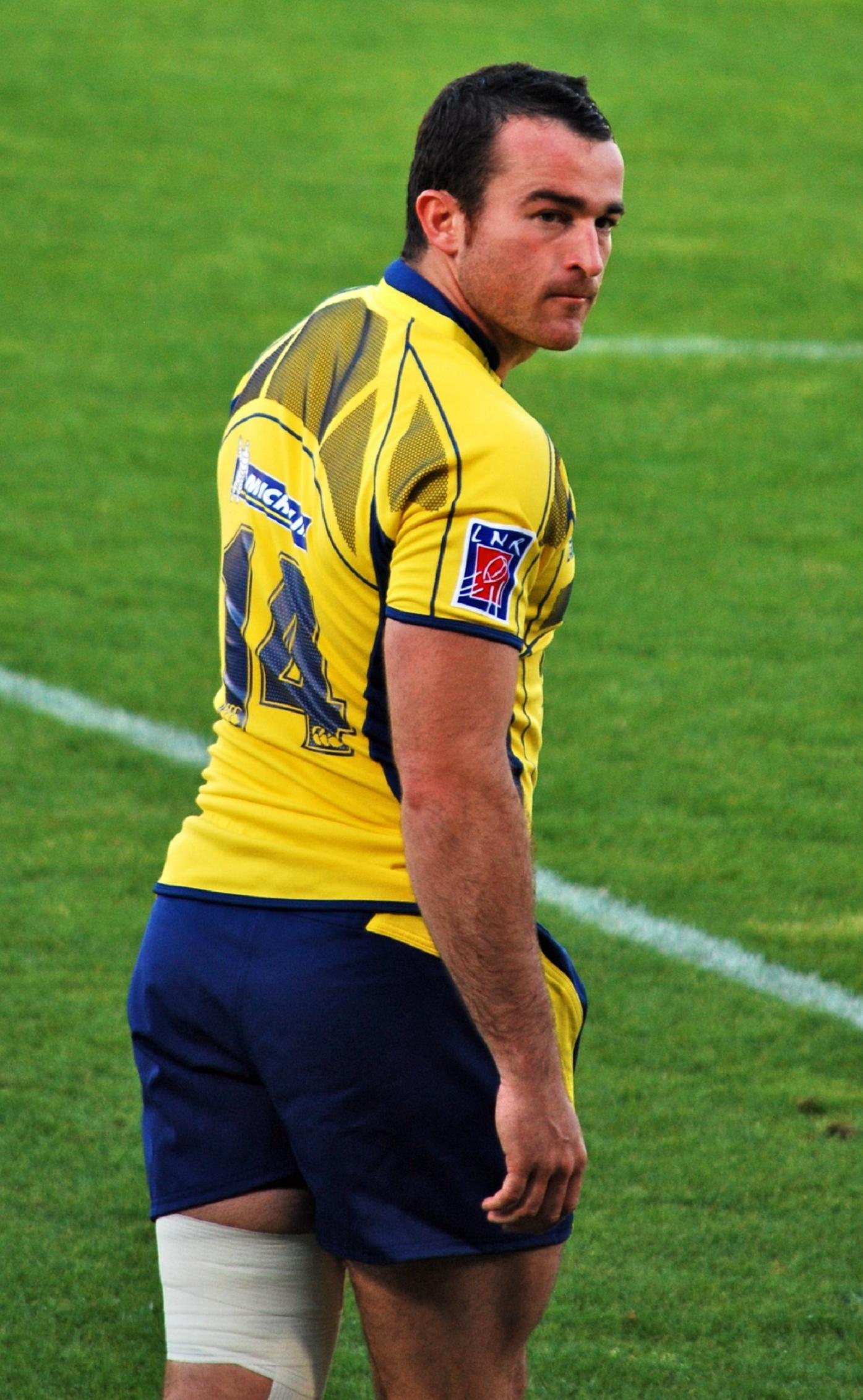
- Baby playing for Clermont Auvergne
- Born: Benoît Baby; 7 September 1983 (age 43) Lavelanet, France
- Height: 1.78 m (5 ft 10 in)
- Weight: 78 kg (12 st 4 lb)

Rugby union career
- Position(s): Centre, Fly-half, Fullback
Senior career
Years	Team	Apps	(Points)
2002–2007	Toulouse	47	(84)
2007–2011	Clermont Auvergne	77	(87)
2011–2017	Biarritz	104	(192)
International career
Years	Team	Apps	(Points)
2005–2009	France	9	(8)
–	French Barbarians		

Benoît Baby (born 7 September 1983) is the French rugby sevens team coach and former international French rugby union footballer. Dubbed the "Million Dollar Baby" during his career, he retired in 2017 following a serious back injury.

Baby usually played at centre, but also at fullback and fly-half and represented France. He made his début for the national team during the 2005 Six Nations, against Ireland in Dublin. France won the match 26 points to 19. Baby was cited for head butting Brian O'Driscoll during the match. The Irish match was Baby's only appearance in the 2005 Six Nations, though he was capped twice again for France that year, in the losses against South Africa in Durban and Australia at Brisbane's Suncorp Stadium.

He was considered as very promising at his post until a series of relatively serious injuries stopped him in his progression. He came back with the French team during the 2008 Autumn internationals, scoring one penalty kick against Argentina, a game the French eventually won 12–6.

In 2010, he was selected in the French Barbarians squad to play Tonga on November 26. He is a former Stade Toulousain, Clermont and Biarritz player.
