= 2014–15 Premiership Rugby =

Rugby union competition in England

2014–15 Aviva Premiership
- Countries: England
- Date: 5 September 2014 – 30 May 2015
- Champions: Saracens (2nd title)
- Runners-up: Bath
- Relegated: London Welsh
- Matches played: 135
- Attendance: 1,804,914 (average 13,370 per match)
- Tries scored: 709 (average 5.3 per match)
- Top point scorer: Andy Goode (Wasps) (240 points)
- Top try scorer: Thomas Waldrom (Exeter) (16 tries)

Official website
- www.premiershiprugby.com

The 2014–15 Aviva Premiership was the 28th season of the top flight English domestic rugby union competition and the fifth one to be sponsored by Aviva. The reigning champions entering the season were Northampton Saints, who had claimed their first title after defeating Saracens in the 2014 final. London Welsh had been promoted as champions from the 2013–14 RFU Championship at the first attempt.

The competition was broadcast by BT Sport for the second successive season. Highlights of each weekend's games were shown on ITV.

== Summary ==
Saracens won their second title after defeating Bath in the final at Twickenham after having finished fourth in the regular season table. London Welsh were relegated after losing all of their games. It was the second time that London Welsh have been relegated from the top flight since the leagues began and the first time since the 2012–13 Premiership Rugby season.

As usual, round 1 included the London Double Header at Twickenham, the eleventh instance since its inception in 2004.

== Teams ==
Twelve teams compete in the league – the top eleven teams from the previous season and London Welsh who were promoted from the 2013–14 RFU Championship after a top flight absence of one year. They replaced Worcester Warriors who were relegated after three years in the top flight.

=== Stadiums and locations ===
2014–15 Aviva Premiership teams
2014-15 Aviva Premiership teams in Greater London

Club	Director of Rugby / Head Coach	Captain	Stadium	Capacity	City/Area
Bath	(England) Mike Ford	(England) Stuart Hooper	The Recreation Ground	13,516	Bath, Somerset
Exeter Chiefs	(England) Rob Baxter	(Australia) Dean Mumm	Sandy Park	12,300	Exeter, Devon
Gloucester	(Ireland) David Humphreys	(England) Billy Twelvetrees	Kingsholm	16,500	Gloucester
Harlequins	(Ireland) Conor O'Shea	(England) Joe Marler	Twickenham Stoop (Note: Harlequins will also play a home game at Twickenham Stadium on 27 December 2014)	14,816	Twickenham, Greater London
Leicester Tigers	(England) Richard Cockerill	(England) Ed Slater	Welford Road	24,000	Leicester
London Irish	(Australia) Brian Smith	(England) George Skivington	Madejski Stadium (Note: London Irish will also play a home game at Twickenham Stadium on 6 September 2014)	24,161	Reading, Berkshire
London Welsh	(Wales) Justin Burnell	(England) Tom May	Kassam Stadium	12,500	Oxford
Newcastle Falcons	(England) Dean Richards	(England) Will Welch	Kingston Park	10,200	Newcastle, Tyne and Wear
Northampton Saints	(England) Jim Mallinder	(England) Dylan Hartley	Franklin's Gardens (Note: Northampton Saints will also play a home game at Stadium mk on 25 April 2015)	13,591	Northampton
Sale Sharks	(Scotland) Bryan Redpath	(New Zealand) Daniel Braid	AJ Bell Stadium	12,000	Salford, Greater Manchester
Saracens	(Ireland) Mark McCall	(South Africa) Alistair Hargreaves	Allianz Park (Note: Saracens will also play a home game at Twickenham Stadium on 6 September 2014 and a home game at Wembley Stadium on 28 March 2015)	10,000 (Note: Allianz Park typically has a capacity of 10,000 but this can be raised to 15,000 with temporary seating)	Hendon, Greater London
Wasps	(Wales) Dai Young	(England) James Haskell	Adams Park; Ricoh Arena (Note: On 8 October 2014, Wasps received approval to purchase a 50% interest in Ricoh Arena in Coventry and announced that they would move their home matches there starting with their Premiership match against London Irish on 21 December)	10,516; 32,609	High Wycombe, Coventry

== Pre-season ==
The Premiership Rugby Sevens Series continued with the 2014 edition. In a change to the format, the series was expanded to include the four Welsh Regions. As a result, the series began on 26 July 2014, at the BT Sport Cardiff Arms Park, continuing at Kingsholm, Franklin's Gardens and Kingston Park on 31 July, 1 August and 2 August 2014 respectively. The finals were on 8 August 2014 at the Twickenham Stoop. This was the first opportunity of the season for any of the teams competing in the Premiership to win a trophy.

Gloucester won the series for the second year in the row, beating Newport Gwent Dragons 12–5 in the final to become the first team to retain the title. As Gloucester have already qualified for the World Club 7s at Twickenham, the place allocated to the winner of the final was given to Harlequins, as the next best performing English club.

== Table ==
2014–15 Premiership Rugby Table
Pos	Team	Pld	W	D	L	PF	PA	PD	TF	TA	TB	LB	Pts	Qualification or relegation
1	Northampton Saints (SF)	22	16	1	5	621	400	+221	75	41	8	2	76	Play-off place, Berth in the 2015–16 European Rugby Champions Cup
2	Bath (RU)	22	16	0	6	625	414	+211	72	43	9	2	75	Play-off place, Berth in the 2015–16 European Rugby Champions Cup
3	Leicester Tigers (SF)	22	15	1	6	453	421	+32	37	39	4	2	68	Play-off place, Berth in the 2015–16 European Rugby Champions Cup
4	Saracens (C)	22	14	1	7	664	418	+246	70	40	5	5	68	Play-off place, Berth in the 2015–16 European Rugby Champions Cup
5	Exeter Chiefs	22	14	0	8	663	437	+226	70	46	5	7	68	Berth in the 2015–16 European Rugby Champions Cup
6	Wasps	22	11	2	9	672	527	+145	77	54	9	4	61	Berth in the 2015–16 European Rugby Champions Cup
7	Sale Sharks	22	11	0	11	497	482	+15	62	54	6	4	54	2015–16 European Rugby Challenge Cup
8	Harlequins	22	10	0	12	444	514	−70	45	50	4	5	49	2015–16 European Rugby Challenge Cup
9	Gloucester	22	9	1	12	553	575	−22	53	61	4	6	48	Play-off for 2015–16 European Rugby Champions Cup
10	London Irish	22	7	1	14	442	578	−136	46	57	4	6	40	2015–16 European Rugby Challenge Cup
11	Newcastle Falcons	22	5	1	16	475	545	−70	57	61	4	8	34	2015–16 European Rugby Challenge Cup
12	London Welsh (Note: The champion of the Championship (Bristol Bears) are eligible for promotion) (R)	22	0	0	22	223	1021	−798	29	147	1	0	1	Relegated

Source: Premiership Rugby
Rules for classification: Tiebreakers for teams tied on points: 1) Number of matches won; 2) Difference between points for and against; 3) Total number of points for; 4) Aggregate number of points scored in matches between tied teams; 5) Number of matches won excluding the first match, then the second and so on until the tie is settled
(C) Champions; (RU) Runners-up; (SF) Losing semi-finalists; (R) Relegated

== Regular season ==
Fixtures for the season were announced by Premiership Rugby on 4 July and, as with previous seasons, Round 1 included the annual London Double Header. Fixtures as per Premiership Rugby Match Centre. All matches following Round 9 were subject to change depending on the television picks for a given round.

=== Round 1 ===
5 September 2014
19:45

(1 BP) Northampton Saints	53–6	Gloucester
Try: North (3) 21' c, 40' c, 49' m G. Pisi 29' c Burrell (2) 43' c, 74' c Fotuali'i 57' m Fisher 69' m Con: Myler (4/6); Hooley (1/2); Pen: Myler (1/1) 12'	Report	Pen: Hook (1/2) 18'; Laidlaw (1/2) 35'

Franklin's Gardens
Attendance: 13,474
Referee: Wayne Barnes

6 September 2014
14:00

Sale Sharks	20–29	Bath
Try: Jennings 33' c Easter 65' c Con: Cipriani (2/2); Pen: Cipriani (2/2) 26', 40'	Report	Try: Watson 1' c Rokoduguni 71' c Con: Ford (2/2); Pen: Ford (5/5) 23', 29', 36', 56', 76'

AJ Bell Stadium
Attendance: 5,353
Referee: JP Doyle

6 September 2014
14:00

(1 BP) Saracens	34–28	Wasps (1 BP)
Try: Ashton 6' c Strettle (3) 20' c, 62' c, 78' c Con: Hodgson (2/2); Farrell (2/2); Pen: Hodgson (2/3) 13', 18'	Report	Try: Hughes 43' c Wade (2) 53' m, 59' c Con: Goode (2/3); Pen: Goode (3/3) 10', 16', 26'

Twickenham Stadium
Attendance: 66,164
Referee: Andrew Small

6 September 2014
15:00

(1 BP) Leicester Tigers	36–17	Newcastle Falcons
Try: Goneva (3) 43' m, 49' c, 60' c Mélé 65' m Con: Burns (2/4); Pen: Burns (4/4) 8', 17', 27', 36'	Report	Try: Mayhew 41' c Saull 70' c Con: Socino (2/2); Pen: Socino (1/1) 22'

Welford Road
Attendance: 22,639
Referee: Luke Pearce

6 September 2014
16:30

(1 BP) London Irish	15–20	Harlequins
Pen: Geraghty (5/6) 24', 33', 42', 54', 66'	Report	Try: Monye 10' c Lindsay-Hague 34' c Con: Evans (2/2); Pen: Evans (2/6) 7', 27'

Twickenham Stadium
Attendance: 66,164
Referee: Greg Garner

7 September 2014
14:00

London Welsh	0–52	Exeter Chiefs (1 BP)
	Report	Try: Waldrom (2) 10' c, 26' c Ewers 45' c Hill 50' c Whitten 59' c Arnott 61' c Botha 68' c Con: Steenson (6/6); Slade (1/1); Pen: Slade (1/1) 35'

Kassam Stadium
Attendance: 2,776
Referee: Dean Richards

=== Round 2 ===
12 September 2014
19:45

Harlequins	0–39	Saracens
	Report	Try: Hodgson 24' c Ashton 69' c Fraser 74' c Con: Hodgson (1/1); Farrell (2/2); Pen: Hodgson (5/5) 10', 21', 29', 61', 63'; Goode (1/1) 48'

Twickenham Stoop
Attendance: 13,102
Referee: Wayne Barnes

13 September 2014
15:00

(1 BP) Bath	53–26	London Welsh (1 BP)
Try: Cook 1' c Rokoduguni (2) 20' c, 54' c Joseph (2) 32' c, 71' m Houston 45' c Fearns 76' c Con: Ford (6/7); Pen: Ford (2/2) 7', 40'	Report	Try: Browne 4' c Stegmann 38' c Jewell 51' c McCaffrey 58' m Con: Barkley (3/4)

The Recreation Ground
Attendance: 12,755
Referee: Matthew Carley

13 September 2014
15:00

Gloucester	34–27	Sale Sharks (2 BP)
Try: May 48' m Cook 61' c penalty try 72' c Con: Laidlaw (2/3); Pen: Laidlaw (5/6) 24', 38', 41', 46', 68'	Report	Try: Arscott 1' m Cusiter 18' c McLean 33' m Cipriani 75' c Con: Cipriani (2/4); Pen: Cipriani (1/1) 58'

Kingsholm
Attendance: 12,353
Referee: Greg Garner

13 September 2014
15:15

(1 BP) Exeter Chiefs	20–24	Leicester Tigers
Try: Ewers 10' c Thomas 32' c Con: Steenson (2/2); Pen: Steenson (2/2) 39', 70'	Report	Try: Allen 26' c B. Youngs 56' m Con: Burns (1/2); Pen: Burns (3/3) 36', 40', 41'; O. Williams (1/1) 76'

Sandy Park
Attendance: 9,721
Referee: JP Doyle

14 September 2014
14:00

Wasps	20–16	Northampton Saints (1 BP)
Try: Johnson 59' c Varndell 61' c Con: R. Jackson (2/2); Pen: Goode (1/2) 18'; Miller (1/1) 73'	Report	Try: Foden 78' c Con: Myler (1/1); Pen: Myler (3/4) 10', 48', 54'

Adams Park
Attendance: 6,374
Referee: Luke Pearce

14 September 2014
15:00

(1 BP) Newcastle Falcons	18–20	London Irish
Try: Furno 9' m S. Wilson 51' m Sinoti 76' m Pen: Socino (1/4) 66'	Report	Try: Mulchrone 44' c Fenby 60' c Con: Geraghty (2/2); Pen: Geraghty (2/3) 20', 38'

Kingston Park
Attendance: 5,888
Referee: Andrew Small

=== Round 3 ===
19 September 2014
19:45

(1 BP) Gloucester	22–25	Exeter Chiefs
Try: May 8' m Murphy 10' c Kalamafoni 62' c Con: Laidlaw (1/2); Hook (1/1); Pen: Hook (1/1) 71'	Report	Try: White 32' c Con: Steenson (1/1); Pen: Steenson (4/6) 2', 14', 18', 23'; Slade (2/2) 36', 47'

Kingsholm
Attendance: 13,463
Referee: Matthew Carley

20 September 2014
14:00

(1 BP) Sale Sharks	46–8	London Welsh
Try: Arscott (3) 2' m, 65' c, 76' c Cobîlaș 22' c Brady 74' c McLean 80' c Con: Cipriani (3/4); Ford (2/2); Pen: Cipriani (2/2) 38', 43'	Report	Try: Reynolds 56' m Pen: Barkley (1/2) 11'

AJ Bell Stadium
Attendance: 4,953
Referee: Andrew Small

20 September 2014
15:00

Harlequins	26–23	Wasps (1 BP)
Try: Robshaw 46' c Brown 53' c Con: Botica (2/2); Pen: Botica (3/4) 19', 22', 39'; Drop: Care (1/1) 57'	Report	Try: Thompson 14' c Varndell 58' m Young 75' m Con: Goode (1/3); Pen: Goode (2/3) 30', 36'

Twickenham Stoop
Attendance: 12,967
Referee: JP Doyle

20 September 2014
15:00

(2 BP) London Irish	32–36	Saracens
Try: Cowan 11' c Lewington (3) 27' c, 31' m, 44' c Con: Geraghty (3/4); Pen: Geraghty (2/5) 41', 65'	Report	Try: Streather 1' c Wigglesworth 21' c B. Vunipola 79' c Con: Farrell (2/2); Hodgson (1/1); Pen: Farrell (3/4) 9', 14', 35'; Goode (2/3) 50', 57'

Madejski Stadium
Attendance: 6,665
Referee: Luke Pearce

20 September 2014
15:15

(1 BP) Bath	45–0	Leicester Tigers
Try: Rokoduguni 8' c Joseph 17' c Eastmond 46' m Woodburn 65' c Stringer 73' c Con: Ford (4/5); Pen: Ford (3/3) 12', 35', 43'; Drop: Ford (1/1) 32'	Report

The Recreation Ground
Attendance: 12,817
Referee: Wayne Barnes

21 September 2014
14:00

Newcastle Falcons	10–35	Northampton Saints (1 BP)
Try: Cato 69' c Con: Socino (1/1); Pen: Socino (1/1) 18'	Report	Try: Hooley 3' c A. Waller 14' m K. Pisi 25' c North 77' c Con: Hooley (2/3); Wilson (1/1); Pen: Hooley (3/3) 6', 12', 23'

Kingston Park
Attendance: 5,057
Referee: Greg Garner

=== Round 4 ===
26 September 2014
19:45

London Welsh	10–46	Gloucester (1 BP)
Try: Pienaar 34' c Con: Barkley (1/1); Pen: Barkley (1/2) 40'	Report	Try: Purdy 24' m Sharples 27' c Atkinson (2) 68' c, 71' c May 73' c penalty try 80' c Con: Hook (1/2); Laidlaw (4/4); Pen: Twelvetrees (1/2) 53'; Laidlaw (1/1) 64'

Kassam Stadium
Attendance: 3,531
Referee: Luke Pearce

27 September 2014
15:00

(1 BP) Leicester Tigers	19–22	London Irish
Try: Goneva 54' c Con: Burns (1/1); Pen: Burns (3/6) 29', 35', 47'; O. Williams (1/1) 70'	Report	Try: Aulika 31' c Con: Geraghty (1/1); Pen: Geraghty (5/6) 5', 14', 52', 60', 78'

Welford Road
Attendance: 21,682
Referee: Greg Garner

27 September 2014
15:00

(1 BP) Saracens	40–19	Sale Sharks
Try: Goode 2' c Joubert 22' c penalty try 40' c Barrington 68' c Con: Hodgson (3/3); Wigglesworth (1/1); Pen: Hodgson (3/3) 7', 15', 18'; Goode (1/1) 75'	Report	Try: Seymour 9' c Brady 52' m penalty try 71' c Con: Cipriani (1/2); Ford (1/1)

Allianz Park
Attendance: 8,451
Referee: JP Doyle

27 September 2014
15:15

(1 BP) Northampton Saints	31–24	Bath (1 BP)
Try: penalty try 6' c Clark 14' c Day 47' c G. Pisi 52' c Con: Myler (4/4); Pen: Myler (1/2) 25'	Report	Try: Wilson 20' c Woodburn 59' c Auterac 69' c Con: Ford (3/3); Pen: Ford (1/1) 33'

Franklin's Gardens
Attendance: 13,365
Referee: Tim Wigglesworth

28 September 2014
14:00

Exeter Chiefs	36–13	Harlequins
Try: Waldrom 22' c Yeandle 65' c Slade 75' c Con: Steenson (3/3); Pen: Slade (2/3) 9', 36'; Steenson (3/3) 12', 40', 50'	Report	Try: Tikoirotuma 46' c Con: Botica (1/1); Pen: Botica (2/3) 1', 33'

Sandy Park
Attendance: 8,860
Referee: Andrew Small

28 September 2014
14:00

(1 BP) Wasps	35–18	Newcastle Falcons
Try: Varndell (2) 16' c, 55' c Gaskell 28' c Miller 70' m Con: Goode (2/2); Miller (1/2); Pen: Goode (3/3) 22', 43', 48'	Report	Try: Tipuna 36' m penalty try 73' c Con: Clegg (1/1); Pen: Socino (2/3) 2', 21'

Adams Park
Attendance: 5,568
Referee: Dean Richards

=== Round 5 ===
3 October 2014
19:45

Bath	21–11	Saracens
Try: Joseph 11' c Eastmond 46' m Con: Ford (1/2); Pen: Ford (3/7) 26', 39', 60'	Report	Try: Wyles 57' m Pen: Hodgson (1/2) 18'; Goode (1/2) 34'

The Recreation Ground
Attendance: 13,314
Referee: Greg Garner

4 October 2014
15:00

(1 BP) Harlequins	52–0	London Welsh
Try: Brown 3' c Care 11' c Yarde (2) 41' c, 78' c Hopper 44' c penalty try 64' c Dickson 66' c Con: Evans (7/7); Pen: Evans (1/1) 22'	Report

Twickenham Stoop
Attendance: 13,657
Referee: Dean Richards

4 October 2014
15:00

(1 BP) London Irish	12–19	Northampton Saints
Pen: Geraghty (4/6) 42', 49', 55', 63'	Report	Try: Burrell 34' c Con: Myler (1/1); Pen: Myler (4/6) 14', 52', 59', 78'

Madejski Stadium
Attendance: 6,717
Referee: Matthew Carley

4 October 2014
15:15

Gloucester	33–16	Leicester Tigers
Try: Wood 19' c Sharples 26' c May 35' c Con: Laidlaw (3/3); Pen: Laidlaw (4/5) 4', 8', 12', 57'	Report	Try: Mélé 79' c Con: O. Williams (1/1); Pen: O. Williams (3/3) 2', 15', 32'

Kingsholm
Attendance: 15,127
Referee: Andrew Small

5 October 2014
14:00

Sale Sharks	25–14	Wasps
Try: Arscott 5' m Cusiter 36' c Brady 76' c Con: Cipriani (2/3); Pen: Cipriani (1/4) 48'; Drop: Cipriani (1/1) 42'	Report	Try: Hughes 26' c Wade 68' c Con: Goode (1/1); Miller (1/1)

AJ Bell Stadium
Attendance: 5,065
Referee: Luke Pearce

5 October 2014
15:00

Newcastle Falcons	29–24	Exeter Chiefs (1 BP)
Try: Sinoti 23' m Catterick 67' c Cato 69' m Con: Socino (1/3); Pen: Socino (4/4) 8', 12', 27', 42'	Report	Try: Waldrom 4' m White 20' m Slade 39' m Pen: Steenson (3/3) 52', 56', 65'

Kingston Park
Attendance: 4,216
Referee: Tim Wigglesworth

=== Round 6 ===
10 October 2014
19:45

Leicester Tigers	22–16	Harlequins (1 BP)
Try: Scully 3' c Con: O. Williams (1/1); Pen: O. Williams (5/9) 13', 17', 35', 47', 66'	Report	Try: Dickson 70' c Con: Evans (1/1); Pen: Evans (3/4) 9', 15', 45'

Welford Road
Attendance: 21,510
Referee: Tim Wigglesworth

11 October 2014
14:30

London Welsh	3–23	Newcastle Falcons
Pen: Barkley (1/1) 5'	Report	Try: Powell 14' m Wilson 40' m Tipuna 51' c Con: Clegg (1/2); Pen: Socino (2/3) 2', 28'

Kassam Stadium
Attendance: 2,154
Referee: Wayne Barnes

11 October 2014
15:00

(1 BP) Exeter Chiefs	44–24	London Irish
Try: Rimmer 16' c Slade 21' c Welch (2) 38' c, 55' c Armand 57' c Con: Steenson (5/5); Pen: Steenson (3/3) 7', 27', 33'	Report	Try: Cowan (2) 69' c, 80' c Fenby 71' c Con: Geraghty (3/3); Pen: Geraghty (1/1) 11'

Sandy Park
Attendance: 8,654
Referee: Ian Tempest

11 October 2014
15:00

Saracens	28–21	Gloucester (1 BP)
Try: Wyles 20' c Hargreaves 24' m Ashton 60' c Con: Hodgson (2/3); Pen: Hodgson (3/3) 13', 47', 67'	Report	Try: Cook 18' c Savage 80' m Con: Laidlaw (1/1); Pen: Laidlaw (3/3) 2', 5', 50'

Allianz Park
Attendance: 9,084
Referee: Dean Richards

11 October 2014
15:15

(1 BP) Northampton Saints	43–10	Sale Sharks
Try: K. Pisi 14' m Manoa (3) 19' c, 52' c, 55' c G. Pisi 31' c Fotuali'i 65' c Con: Myler (4/5); Wilson (1/1); Pen: Myler (1/1) 6'	Report	Try: Jennings 62' c Con: Ford (1/1); Pen: Cipriani (1/1) 22'

Franklin's Gardens
Attendance: 13,362
Referee: Andrew Small

12 October 2014
14:00

Wasps	29–22	Bath (1 BP)
Try: penalty try 47' c Tagicakibau 49' c Con: Goode (2/2); Pen: Goode (4/4) 6', 21', 35', 43'; Daly (1/1) 40'	Report	Try: Joseph 51' m Young 63' c Sisi 69' c Con: Ford (2/3); Pen: Ford (1/1) 75'

Adams Park
Attendance: 7,397
Referee: JP Doyle

=== Round 7 ===
14 November 2014
19:45

(1 BP) Gloucester	15–22	Harlequins
Pen: Twelvetrees (4/8) 3', 6', 23', 26'; A. Thomas (1/1) 61'	Report	Try: Easter 29' c Wallace 58' c Walker 77' m Con: Evans (2/3); Pen: Evans (1/2) 35'

Kingsholm
Attendance: 14,303
Referee: Andrew Small

14 November 2014
19:45

(1 BP) Northampton Saints	18–24	Exeter Chiefs
Try: Stephenson 57' c Elliott 68' m Con: Myler (1/2); Pen: Myler (2/2) 4', 14'	Report	Try: Cowan-Dickie 2' c Waldrom (2) 29' c, 37' c Con: Steenson (3/3); Pen: Steenson (1/1) 54'

Franklin's Gardens
Attendance: 13,362
Referee: Dean Richards

15 November 2014
12:00

(1 BP) Sale Sharks	36–8	London Irish
Try: Seymour 10' c Braid 35' m penalty try (2) 40' c, 47' c Forsyth 73' c Con: Cipriani (3/4); Macleod (1/1); Pen: Cipriani (1/3) 32'	Report	Try: Skivington 69' m Pen: Noakes (1/2) 1'

AJ Bell Stadium
Attendance: 4,753
Referee: Matthew Carley

15 November 2014
17:00

Bath	23–14	Newcastle Falcons
Try: Hooper 38' c Joseph 52' c Con: Henson (2/2); Pen: Henson (2/3) 65', 78'; Drop: Henson (1/1) 26'	Report	Try: Wilson 33' c Sinoti 72' c Con: Socino (1/1); Clegg (1/1)

The Recreation Ground
Attendance: 12,877
Referee: Ian Tempest

16 November 2014
13:00

Leicester Tigers	21–21	Saracens
Pen: O. Williams (7/9) 22', 28', 43', 51', 58', 67', 80'	Report	Pen: Hodgson (7/8) 9', 19', 31', 33', 48', 56', 74'

Welford Road
Attendance: 21,680
Referee: Tim Wigglesworth

16 November 2014
15:15

(1 BP) Wasps	71–7	London Welsh
Try: Hughes (2) 1' c, 32' m Johnson (3) 5' c, 51' c, 62' m Tagicakibau 16' c Wade (3) 44' c, 70' c, 72' m Simpson 54' c Varndell 67' c Con: Goode (6/7); Lozowski (2/4)	Report	Try: Pienaar 59' c Con: Robinson (1/1)

Adams Park
Attendance: 5,842
Referee: Thomas Foley

=== Round 8 ===
21 November 2014
19:45

(1 BP) Harlequins	12–16	Sale Sharks
Pen: Evans (4/4) 5', 16', 54', 58'	Report	Try: Braid 68' c Con: Cipriani (1/1); Pen: Cipriani (3/5) 2', 25', 55'

Twickenham Stoop
Attendance: 13,067
Referee: Thomas Foley

21 November 2014
20:00

Newcastle Falcons	20–10	Gloucester
Try: Sinoti 44' m Pen: Clegg (5/6) 9', 16', 20', 42', 63'	Report	Try: Afoa 1' c Con: Burns (1/1); Pen: Burns (1/3) 55'

Kingston Park
Attendance: 6,512
Referee: Tim Wigglesworth

22 November 2014
15:00

Exeter Chiefs	31–15	Wasps
Try: Nowell (2) 2' c, 29' m Waldrom 35' c Con: Steenson (2/3); Pen: Steenson (4/4) 9', 19', 60', 68'	Report	Try: Miller 12' m Lindsay 65' c Con: Lozowski (1/1); Pen: Goode (1/1) 6'

Sandy Park
Attendance: 8,878
Referee: Ian Tempest

22 November 2014
15:00

London Irish	23–33	Bath
Try: Paice 46' c Short 73' c Con: Geraghty (2/2); Pen: Geraghty (3/5) 2', 38', 51'	Report	Try: penalty try 35' c Thomas 41' c Cook 68' c Con: Henson (3/3); Pen: Henson (4/5) 4', 14', 26', 58'

Madejski Stadium
Attendance: 8,137
Referee: Andrew Small

23 November 2014
13:00

(1 BP) Saracens	24–31	Northampton Saints
Try: Wray 39' m Wyles (2) 64' m, 69' m Pen: Hodgson (3/3) 7', 48', 80'	Report	Try: Wilson (2) 1' c, 13' c Dowson 21' m Con: Myler (2/3); Pen: Myler (4/5) 10', 31', 59', 75'

Allianz Park
Attendance: 8,314
Referee: Matthew Carley

23 November 2014
15:15

London Welsh	5–26	Leicester Tigers (1 BP)
Try: Scott 22' m	Report	Try: Thacker (2) 28' m, 38' c Kitchener 48' c Barbieri 63' c Con: Bell (3/3)

Kassam Stadium
Attendance: 3,249
Referee: Dean Richards

=== Round 9 ===
28 November 2014
19:45

(1 BP) Bath	25–6	Harlequins
Try: Banahan 7' m Eastmond 18' m Batty 64' m Houston 72' c Con: Devoto (1/4); Pen: Devoto (1/2) 24'	Report	Pen: Evans (2/2) 22', 41'

The Recreation Ground
Attendance: 13,327
Referee: Wayne Barnes

29 November 2014
15:00

Leicester Tigers	18–16	Wasps (1 BP)
Pen: O. Williams (6/6) 9', 13', 40', 62', 65', 77'	Report	Try: Leiua 41' c Con: Goode (1/1); Pen: Goode (3/4) 19', 68', 74'

Welford Road
Attendance: 21,907
Referee: Luke Pearce

29 November 2014
16:30

Exeter Chiefs	27–19	Saracens
Pen: Steenson (9/9) 4', 16', 20', 24', 28', 39', 46', 65', 75'	Report	Try: Itoje 80' c Con: Goode (1/1); Pen: Hodgson (4/5) 13', 18', 41', 49'

Sandy Park
Attendance: 10,335
Referee: Greg Garner

30 November 2014
13:00

London Irish	9–21	Gloucester
Pen: Geraghty (3/4) 51', 55', 61'	Report	Try: Purdy 47' m McColl 72' c Con: Laidlaw (1/2); Pen: Laidlaw (3/4) 34', 45', 59'

Madejski Stadium
Attendance: 5,907
Referee: Matthew Carley

30 November 2014
14:30

London Welsh	14–43	Northampton Saints (1 BP)
Try: Vea 49' c Reynolds 75' c Con: Ross (1/1); Robinson (1/1)	Report	Try: Clark 4' m Myler 32' c Manoa 36' c Elliott 42' c Foden 45' c Wilson 51' m Nutley 70' m Con: Myler (4/6)

Kassam Stadium
Attendance: 4,357
Referee: Tim Wigglesworth

30 November 2014
15:15

(1 BP) Newcastle Falcons	13–18	Sale Sharks
Try: Socino 7' c Con: Clegg (1/1); Pen: Clegg (2/2) 22', 56'	Report	Try: Braid 17' m Leota 68' c Con: Cipriani (1/2); Pen: Cipriani (2/3) 37', 60'

Kingston Park
Attendance: 5,572
Referee: Dean Richards

=== Round 10 ===
19 December 2014
19:45

Sale Sharks	18–11	Exeter Chiefs (1 BP)
Try: Cueto 49' c Cipriani 58' m Con: Cipriani (1/1); Pen: Cipriani (2/3) 15', 30'	Report	Try: Waldrom 71' m Pen: Steenson (2/2) 21', 54'

AJ Bell Stadium
Attendance: 5,266
Referee: Wayne Barnes

20 December 2014
15:00

Harlequins	15–7	Newcastle Falcons
Pen: Swiel (5/5) 8', 55', 60', 63', 67'	Report	Try: Al. Tuilagi 40' c Con: Socino (1/1)

Twickenham Stoop
Attendance: 13,660
Referee: Matthew Carley

20 December 2014
15:00

(1 BP) Saracens	78–7	London Welsh
Try: M. Vunipola (2) 2' c, 31' c Sharman 13' c Kruis 18' c Ashton 35' c Wray 50' c Barrington 58' c Wigglesworth (3) 64' m, 72' c, 77' c Ransom 66' c Con: Farrell (10/11); Pen: Farrell (1/1) 10'	Report	Try: Kear 38' c Con: Robinson (1/1)

Allianz Park
Attendance: 8,037
Referee: Ian Tempest

20 December 2014
15:15

Northampton Saints	23–19	Leicester Tigers (1 BP)
Try: A. Waller 45' m Foden 64' m Elliott 76' c Con: Myler (1/2); Pen: Myler (2/3) 26', 39'	Report	Try: penalty try 20' c Goneva (2) 60' m, 70' c Con: O. Williams (1/2); Burns (1/1)

Franklin's Gardens
Attendance: 13,362
Referee: JP Doyle

20 December 2014
17:30

Gloucester	16–39	Bath
Try: Robson 70' c Con: Hook (1/1); Pen: Laidlaw (3/4) 1', 16', 37'	Report	Try: penalty try 58' c Garvey (2) 67' c, 80' c Con: Ford (3/3); Pen: Ford (6/7) 6', 18', 22', 28', 40', 49'

Kingsholm
Attendance: 16,000
Referee: Greg Garner

21 December 2014
14:00

(1 BP) Wasps	48–16	London Irish
Try: Simpson 43' m Goode 66' c Daly 68' c Masi 79' m Con: Goode (2/3); Pen: Goode (8/8) 5', 11', 19', 30', 34', 39', 48', 60'	Report	Try: Cross 15' c Con: Homer (1/1); Pen: Homer (3/3) 23', 37', 40'

Ricoh Arena
Attendance: 28,254
Referee: Thomas Foley

=== Round 11 ===
26 December 2014
15:00

London Irish	24–9	London Welsh
Try: Lewington 29' c Cross 49' c Court 67' c Con: Homer (3/3); Pen: Homer (1/3) 25'	Report	Pen: Robinson (3/3) 15', 36', 56'

Madejski Stadium
Attendance: 7,097
Referee: Greg Garner

27 December 2014
14:00

(1 BP) Bath	31–14	Exeter Chiefs
Try: Agulla 28' c Eastmond 35' c Attwood 51' c Watson 76' c Con: Ford (4/4); Pen: Ford (1/2) 59'	Report	Try: Jess 23' c Nowell 44' c Con: Steenson (2/2)

The Recreation Ground
Attendance: 13,349
Referee: JP Doyle

27 December 2014
14:00

(2 BP) Sale Sharks	30–32	Leicester Tigers (1 BP)
Try: Cusiter 5' m Addison 31' c Hines 40' c Tuitupou 44' m Con: Cipriani (2/4); Pen: Cipriani (2/2) 18', 37'	Report	Try: Bai 12' m Tait 29' c Benjamin 57' c Salvi 78' c Con: Burns (2/3); O. Williams (1/1); Pen: Burns (1/2) 33'; O. Williams (1/1) 72'

AJ Bell Stadium
Attendance: 11,247
Referee: Tim Wigglesworth

27 December 2014
15:00

(1 BP) Newcastle Falcons	23–25	Saracens
Try: Sinoti 42' c Harris (2) 74' m, 80' m Con: Socino (1/3); Pen: Socino (2/3) 7', 36'	Report	Try: de Kock 20' c Tompkins 54' c Ashton 68' m Con: Farrell (2/3); Pen: Farrell (2/3) 39', 62'

Kingston Park
Attendance: 9,192
Referee: Luke Pearce

27 December 2014
16:30

(1 BP) Harlequins	25–30	Northampton Saints
Try: Lowe 5' m Clifford 59' c Twomey 76' c Con: Swiel (2/3); Pen: Swiel (2/3) 9', 52'	Report	Try: Manoa 18' c North 42' c Fotuali'i 71' c Con: Myler (3/3); Pen: Myler (3/3) 11', 37', 54'

Twickenham Stadium
Attendance: 82,000
Referee: Wayne Barnes

28 December 2014
14:30

(1 BP) Gloucester	23–30	Wasps
Try: May 1' c Kvesic 29' c Con: Laidlaw (2/2); Pen: Laidlaw (3/4) 45', 51', 59'	Report	Try: Wade 8' c Varndell 19' c Hughes 36' c Con: Goode (3/3); Pen: Goode (2/2) 16', 63'; Daly (1/1) 75'

Kingsholm
Attendance: 16,000
Referee: Dean Richards

=== Round 12 ===
2 January 2015
19:45

(1 BP) Northampton Saints	39–31	Newcastle Falcons (1 BP)
Try: Myler 14' c G. Pisi 32' c Clark 50' m penalty try 58' c Burrell 70' c Con: Myler (3/4); Wilson (1/1); Pen: Myler (2/2) 9', 45'	Report	Try: Harris 20' c McGuigan 61' c Tait 64' c Mayhew 76' c Con: Catterick (4/4); Pen: Catterick (1/1) 28'

Franklin's Gardens
Attendance: 13,362
Referee: Ian Tempest

3 January 2015
14:00

Saracens	22–6	London Irish
Try: Strettle (2) 30' m, 61' m Pen: Farrell (4/4) 23', 28', 52', 57'	Report	Pen: Homer (2/3) 44', 47'

Allianz Park
Attendance: 9,306
Referee: Tim Wigglesworth

3 January 2015
16:30

(1 BP) Exeter Chiefs	25–26	Gloucester
Try: Nowell 48' c Jess 50' c Waldrom 70' m Con: Steenson (2/3); Pen: Steenson (2/3) 56', 61'	Report	Try: Savage 52' c Morgan 67' c Con: Laidlaw (2/2); Pen: Laidlaw (3/3) 2', 21', 58'; Drop: Twelvetrees (1/1) 45'

Sandy Park
Attendance: 12,621
Referee: Andrew Small

4 January 2015
14:00

Leicester Tigers	17–8	Bath
Try: T. Youngs 16' m Pen: O. Williams (4/5) 7', 20', 44', 59'	Report	Try: Batty 79' m Pen: Ford (1/2) 4'

Welford Road
Attendance: 24,000
Referee: Matthew Carley

4 January 2015
14:00

(1 BP) Wasps	41–16	Sale Sharks
Try: Haskell 6' c Hughes 20' c Simpson (2) 40' c, 44' c Johnson 51' c Con: Goode (5/5); Pen: Goode (1/2) 2'; Drop: Goode (1/1) 31'	Report	Try: Ostrikov 75' c Con: Cipriani (1/1); Pen: Ford (3/3) 5', 9', 23'

Ricoh Arena
Attendance: 15,343
Referee: Greg Garner

4 January 2015
14:30

London Welsh	13–24	Harlequins (1 BP)
Try: Rowley 21' c Con: Robinson (1/1); Pen: Robinson (2/3) 31', 59'	Report	Try: Dickson 26' m Yarde 37' c Sinckler 51' m Williams 71' c Con: Swiel (2/4)

Kassam Stadium
Attendance: 3,034
Referee: JP Doyle

=== Round 13 ===
9 January 2015
19:45

Gloucester	24–23	Saracens (1 BP)
Try: Robson 35' m Braley 60' c Con: Hook (1/2); Pen: Hook (4/6) 16', 20', 59', 80'	Report	Try: penalty try 6' c B. Vunipola 43' m M. Vunipola 68' m Con: Goode (1/3); Pen: Goode (2/2) 23', 26'

Kingsholm
Attendance: 12,894
Referee: JP Doyle

10 January 2015
14:00

Sale Sharks	20–7	Northampton Saints
Try: Lewis-Roberts 29' c Braid 55' c Con: Cipriani (2/2); Pen: Cipriani (2/2) 9', 13'	Report	Try: Harrison 64' c Con: Myler (1/1)

AJ Bell Stadium
Attendance: 8,311
Referee: Matthew Carley

10 January 2015
15:00

(1 BP) Bath	39–26	Wasps (1 BP)
Try: Louw 10' c Rokoduguni 31' c Burgess 44' c Banahan 59' m Devoto 64' c Con: Ford (4/5); Pen: Ford (2/2) 28', 37'	Report	Try: Leiua 25' m Hughes 52' c Jacobs 72' c Lozowski 74' c Con: Goode (1/2); Lozowski (2/2)

The Recreation Ground
Attendance: 13,352
Referee: Andrew Small

10 January 2015
15:15

(1 BP) Harlequins	32–12	Leicester Tigers
Try: Care 22' c Clifford 38' m Yarde 44' c Swiel 80' c Con: Botica (2/3); Swiel (1/1); Pen: Botica (2/4) 12', 50'	Report	Pen: O. Williams (4/4) 2', 9', 19', 52'

Twickenham Stoop
Attendance: 14,800
Referee: Luke Pearce

11 January 2015
14:00

(1 BP) Newcastle Falcons	38–7	London Welsh
Try: Sinoti 14' m Vickers 18' c Blair 21' c Welch 32' m Hogg 55' c Catterick 77' c Con: Catterick (4/6)	Report	Try: Scott 23' c Con: Robinson (1/1)

Kingston Park
Attendance: 5,048
Referee: Wayne Barnes

11 January 2015
15:00

(1 BP) London Irish	28–26	Exeter Chiefs (1 BP)
Try: Cowan (2) 26' m, 56' m Guest 45' c Lewington 47' m Con: Geraghty (1/3); Pen: Homer (1/1) 68'; Drop: Geraghty (1/1) 80'	Report	Try: Mumm 35' c Ewers 60' c Con: Steenson (2/2); Pen: Steenson (4/4) 19', 32', 70', 76'

Madejski Stadium
Attendance: 5,909
Referee: Dean Richards

=== Round 14 ===
13 February 2015
19:45

Leicester Tigers	18–15	Gloucester (1 BP)
Pen: Burns (6/6) 6', 11', 34', 45', 47', 69'	Report	Pen: Hook (5/6) 9', 15', 25', 49', 64'

Welford Road
Attendance: 20,298
Referee: JP Doyle

13 February 2015
19:45

Northampton Saints	15–9	London Irish (1 BP)
Try: K. Pisi 26' c Dickinson 53' m Con: Myler (1/2); Pen: Myler (1/1) 65'	Report	Pen: Geraghty (3/4) 34', 59', 67'

Franklin's Gardens
Attendance: 13,362
Referee: Andrew Small

14 February 2015
16:30

(1 BP) Exeter Chiefs	46–17	Newcastle Falcons
Try: Nowell 9' c Slade 25' m penalty try 34' c Waldrom 38' c Dollman 59' c Thomas 62' c Con: Slade (4/5); Steenson (1/1); Pen: Slade (2/2) 2', 19'	Report	Try: Tipuna 56' c Welch 78' c Con: Catterick (2/2); Pen: Catterick (1/1) 14'

Sandy Park
Attendance: 7,218
Referee: Thomas Foley

15 February 2015
13:00

London Welsh	12–52	Sale Sharks (1 BP)
Try: Lewis 3' c Fonua 57' m Con: Jewell (1/1)	Report	Try: Haley 6' c Taylor (2) 14' c, 33' c Addison (2) 26' c, 78' m Arscott (2) 39' c, 43' m Cueto 73' c Con: Macleod (5/6); Ford (1/2)

Kassam Stadium
Attendance: 2,811
Referee: Tim Wigglesworth

15 February 2015
13:00

Saracens	34–24	Bath
Try: Wyles 23' m George 43' c Ashton 49' c Con: Goode (2/2); Pen: Hodgson (1/1) 21'; Goode (4/4) 32', 42', 59', 76'	Report	Try: Rokoduguni (2) 45' c, 71' c Woodburn 70' c Con: Homer (3/3); Pen: Homer (1/1) 13'

Allianz Park
Attendance: 9,225
Referee: Luke Pearce

15 February 2015
14:00

(1 BP) Wasps	37–6	Harlequins
Try: Varndell 21' c Daly 26' c penalty try (2) 46' c, 77' c Con: Goode (3/3); Lozowski (1/1); Pen: Goode (3/3) 8', 14', 18'	Report	Pen: Evans (2/3) 20', 39'

Ricoh Arena
Attendance: 16,116
Referee: Greg Garner

=== Round 15 ===
20 February 2015
19:45

Newcastle Falcons	23–23	Wasps
Try: Tait 4' m Furno 48' m Socino 63' c Con: Catterick (1/3); Pen: Catterick (2/2) 8', 38'	Report	Try: Miller 29' m Daly 31' m Thompson 67' c Con: Goode (1/3); Pen: Goode (2/2) 21', 52'

Kingston Park
Attendance: 7,547
Referee: JP Doyle

21 February 2015
14:00

Sale Sharks	14–10	Saracens (1 BP)
Try: Tuitupou 21' c Mills 39' c Con: Cipriani (2/2)	Report	Try: Barrington 79' c Con: Goode (1/1); Pen: Goode (1/3) 17'

AJ Bell Stadium
Attendance: 6,217
Referee: Dean Richards

21 February 2015
15:00

(1 BP) Gloucester	48–10	London Welsh
Try: Moriarty 11' c Sharples 16' c Kvesic 25' c Purdy (2) 52' c, 75' c Puafisi 80' c Con: Hook (6/6); Pen: Hook (2/2) 4', 9'	Report	Try: Kirwan 47' c Con: Robinson (1/1); Pen: Robinson (1/1) 7'

Kingsholm
Attendance: 12,940
Referee: Ian Tempest

21 February 2015
15:00

Harlequins	21–32	Exeter Chiefs
Try: Evans 14' m Hopper 68' c Con: Evans (1/2); Pen: Evans (3/3) 7', 33', 56'	Report	Try: White 21' c Slade 48' c Con: Slade (2/2); Pen: Slade (6/7) 18', 29', 39', 58', 60', 71'

Twickenham Stoop
Attendance: 14,800
Referee: Matthew Carley

21 February 2015
15:15

Bath	13–21	Northampton Saints
Try: Woodburn 1' c Con: Homer (1/1); Pen: Homer (2/6) 23', 57'	Report	Try: Wilson 27' m Haywood 34' c Con: Myler (1/2); Pen: Myler (3/4) 47', 52', 70'

The Recreation Ground
Attendance: 13,349
Referee: Greg Garner

22 February 2015
14:00

(1 BP) London Irish	6–12	Leicester Tigers
Pen: Geraghty (2/2) 28', 51'	Report	Pen: Burns (2/5) 5', 21'; Mélé (1/1) 58'; Drop: Burns (1/1) 12'

Madejski Stadium
Attendance: 8,404
Referee: Wayne Barnes

=== Round 16 ===
27 February 2015
19:45

Northampton Saints	17–13	Harlequins (1 BP)
Try: Manoa 29' c Wilson 53' m Wood 66' m Con: Myler (1/3)	Report	Try: Yarde 80' c Con: Botica (1/1); Pen: Evans (2/2) 26', 34'

Franklin's Gardens
Attendance: 13,362
Referee: Tim Wigglesworth

28 February 2015
14:30

London Welsh	12–50	London Irish (1 BP)
Try: Tincknell 11' c Vea 52' m Con: Robinson (1/1)	Report	Try: Lewington (3) 3' m, 46' c, 79' m Fowlie 5' m Geraghty (2) 16' c, 28' c Parr 35' c Fenby 39' c Con: Geraghty (4/6); Noakes (1/2)

Kassam Stadium
Attendance: 3,593
Referee: Matthew Carley

28 February 2015
15:00

Leicester Tigers	28–8	Sale Sharks
Try: Pearce 12' c penalty try 30' c Bai 78' m Con: Burns (2/3); Pen: Burns (3/3) 5', 15', 60'	Report	Try: Arscott 50' m Pen: Macleod (1/1) 9'

Welford Road
Attendance: 21,896
Referee: Greg Garner

28 February 2015
15:00

Saracens	22–17	Newcastle Falcons (1 BP)
Try: Strettle 9' c Con: Hodgson (1/1); Pen: Hodgson (2/2) 7', 29'; Spencer (3/3) 55', 61', 77'	Report	Try: Saull 2' m Al. Tuilagi 17' m Welch 45' c Con: Catterick (1/3)

Allianz Park
Attendance: 7,473
Referee: Andrew Small

28 February 2015
15:15

Exeter Chiefs	16–6	Bath
Try: Chudley 72' c Con: Slade (1/1); Pen: Slade (3/3) 10', 42', 67'	Report	Pen: Homer (2/2) 5', 36'

Sandy Park
Attendance: 12,621
Referee: Dean Richards

1 March 2015
14:00

(1 BP) Wasps	32–21	Gloucester
Try: Young (2) 25' c, 41' c Miller 34' m Daly 37' m Thompson 71' m Con: Goode (2/5); Pen: Goode (1/1) 69'	Report	Try: Moriarty 18' c Purdy 59' m Con: Hook (1/2); Pen: Hook (3/4) 8', 31', 46'

Ricoh Arena
Attendance: 14,056
Referee: Wayne Barnes

=== Round 17 ===
6 March 2015
19:45

Bath	12–3	Sale Sharks
Pen: Homer (4/7) 16', 28', 55', 64'	Report	Pen: Cipriani (1/2) 30'

The Recreation Ground
Attendance: 13,430
Referee: Wayne Barnes

7 March 2015
15:00

(1 BP) Exeter Chiefs	74–19	London Welsh
Try: Chudley 22' c James 27' c Yeandle 33' c Jess 38' c Slade 41' c Waldrom (2) 53' m, 73' c penalty try (2) 57' c, 67' c Whitten 60' c Con: Slade (5/6); Steenson (4/4); Pen: Slade (2/3) 5', 15'	Report	Try: Trevett 3' m Stegmann (2) 18' c, 78' c Con: Roberts (1/2); Davies (1/1)

Sandy Park
Attendance: 8,721
Referee: Craig Maxwell-Keys

7 March 2015
15:00

Harlequins	26–20	London Irish (1 BP)
Try: Care 28' c Hopper 47' c Con: Evans (2/2); Pen: Evans (4/4) 3', 10', 18', 24'	Report	Try: Short 32' c Fowlie 65' c Con: Geraghty (2/2); Pen: Geraghty (2/2) 14', 21'

Twickenham Stoop
Attendance: 14,800
Referee: JP Doyle

7 March 2015
15:15

Gloucester	33–33	Northampton Saints
Try: Sharples 23' c Hibbard 28' c Murphy 45' c Con: Laidlaw (3/3); Pen: Laidlaw (4/4) 8', 12', 20', 75'	Report	Try: Wilson (2) 42' c, 48' c Manoa 78' c Con: Myler (3/3); Pen: Myler (4/5) 3', 6', 40', 56'

Kingsholm
Attendance: 14,857
Referee: Greg Garner

8 March 2015
14:00

Wasps	17–26	Saracens
Try: Wade 12' c Daly 14' c Con: Goode (2/2); Pen: Goode (1/3) 4'	Report	Try: Wray 21' c Wyles 31' c Con: Goode (2/2); Pen: Goode (4/5) 7', 26', 49', 65'

Ricoh Arena
Attendance: 16,874
Referee: Matthew Carley

8 March 2015
15:00

(1 BP) Newcastle Falcons	12–16	Leicester Tigers
Try: Lawson 9' c Sinoti 36' m Con: Catterick (1/2)	Report	Try: Bell 74' c Con: Burns (1/1); Pen: Burns (3/4) 14', 28', 58'

Kingston Park
Attendance: 9,019
Referee: Luke Pearce

=== Round 18 ===
27 March 2015
19:45

(1 BP) Northampton Saints	52–30	Wasps
Try: North (2) 9' m, 34' m penalty try 35' c Corbisiero 39' c K. Pisi 71' c Tuala (2) 74' c, 77' m Con: Myler (4/7); Pen: Myler (3/3) 28', 54', 61'	Report	Try: Wade (3) 4' c, 18' c, 67' c Con: Lozowski (3/3); Pen: Lozowski (3/3) 12', 33', 43'

Franklin's Gardens
Attendance: 13,362
Referee: Craig Maxwell-Keys

28 March 2015
15:00

Leicester Tigers	25–18	Exeter Chiefs (1 BP)
Try: Parling 64' c Con: Burns (1/1); Pen: Burns (6/6) 10', 17', 36', 39', 41', 74'	Report	Try: Waldrom 50' m Chudley 70' c Con: Slade (1/2); Pen: Slade (2/4) 22', 80'

Welford Road
Attendance: 24,000
Referee: JP Doyle

28 March 2015
15:00

London Irish	22–21	Newcastle Falcons (1 BP)
Try: Aulika 1' c Steele 11' c Fenby 39' m Con: Geraghty (2/3); Pen: Noakes (1/1) 76'	Report	Try: Harris 65' m Powell 78' c Con: Catterick (1/2); Pen: Catterick (3/3) 15', 33', 55'

Madejski Stadium
Attendance: 15,731
Referee: Greg Garner

28 March 2015
15:15

(1 BP) Saracens	42–14	Harlequins
Try: Wyles (2) 10' c, 73' c Ashton (2) 23' m, 50' c B. Vunipola 79' c Con: Hodgson (1/2); Goode (3/3); Pen: Hodgson (1/2) 15'; Goode (2/2) 32', 34'	Report	Try: Clifford 1' m Pen: Evans (3/3) 17', 46', 56'

Wembley Stadium
Attendance: 84,068
Referee: Wayne Barnes

- This match set a world record for attendance at a domestic club rugby match. This record was broken at the 2016 Top 14 final at Camp Nou in Barcelona, which drew 99,124.

29 March 2015
14:00

Sale Sharks	23–6	Gloucester
Try: Leota 21' c Beaumont 58' c Con: Cipriani (2/2); Pen: Cipriani (3/3) 40', 47', 56'	Report	Pen: Hook (2/3) 14', 33'

AJ Bell Stadium
Attendance: 6,879
Referee: Matthew Carley

29 March 2015
14:30

London Welsh	14–29	Bath (1 BP)
Try: Reynolds 25' c Fonua 75' c Con: Roberts (1/1); Robinson (1/1)	Report	Try: Webber 11' m Houston (2) 21' m, 64' m Burgess 46' c Fa'osiliva 66' c Con: Homer (2/5)

Kassam Stadium
Attendance: 3,354
Referee: Thomas Foley

=== Round 19 ===
10 April 2015
19:45

Newcastle Falcons	19–29	Bath (1 BP)
Try: Sinoti 31' c Con: Clegg (1/1); Pen: Clegg (3/3) 5', 24', 47'; Catterick (1/1) 68'	Report	Try: Devoto 9' c Rokoduguni 16' m Watson 39' c Banahan 42' c Con: Ford (3/4); Pen: Ford (1/1) 72'

Kingston Park
Attendance: 7,492
Referee: JP Doyle

11 April 2015
15:00

Harlequins	29–26	Gloucester (1 BP)
Try: Walker 9' m Yarde 69' m Lindsay-Hague 74' c Con: Evans (1/3); Pen: Evans (4/4) 22', 28', 51', 56'	Report	Try: Meakes 30' c Sharples 47' m Robson 78' m Con: Laidlaw (1/2); Pen: Laidlaw (3/4) 18', 23', 61'

Twickenham Stoop
Attendance: 14,800
Referee: Luke Pearce

11 April 2015
15:15

Saracens	22–6	Leicester Tigers
Try: B. Vunipola 39' c Bosch 41' c Wyles 48' m Con: Hodgson (2/3); Pen: Hodgson (1/1) 60'	Report	Pen: Burns (2/2) 2', 10'

Allianz Park
Attendance: 9,982
Referee: Matthew Carley

12 April 2015
14:00

Exeter Chiefs	21–10	Northampton Saints
Try: Dollman 16' m penalty try 45' c Con: Slade (1/2); Pen: Slade (3/4) 9', 42', 54'	Report	Try: Wilson 31' m Elliott 80' m

Sandy Park
Attendance: 12,139
Referee: Wayne Barnes

12 April 2015
14:30

London Welsh	13–40	Wasps (1 BP)
Try: Fonua 22' m Elder 60' m Pen: Robinson (1/1) 47'	Report	Try: Varndell (3) 3' c, 10' m, 56' c Johnson 51' c Tagicakibau 65' c Leiua 80' c Con: Goode (4/5); Lozowski (1/1)

Kassam Stadium
Attendance: 4,015
Referee: Greg Garner

12 April 2015
15:00

London Irish	25–23	Sale Sharks (1 BP)
Try: Fenby 40' c Lewington (2) 51' m, 57' c Con: Noakes (2/3); Pen: Noakes (2/5) 17', 22'	Report	Try: Arscott (2) 2' m, 48' c Haley 36' m Con: Cipriani (1/3); Pen: Cipriani (2/3) 44', 63'

Madejski Stadium
Attendance: 5,575
Referee: Greg Macdonald

=== Round 20 ===
24 April 2015
19:45

(1 BP) Bath	43–18	London Irish
Try: Houston 45' c Joseph 49' c Banahan 54' m Burgess 60' c Rokoduguni 71' m Con: Ford (3/5); Pen: Ford (4/4) 3', 7', 17', 27'	Report	Try: Court 40' c Cowan 78' m Con: Noakes (1/1); Pen: Noakes (2/2) 15', 29'

The Recreation Ground
Attendance: 13,349
Referee: Luke Pearce

25 April 2015
14:00

(1 BP) Sale Sharks	23–25	Harlequins (1 BP)
Try: Arscott (2) 52' c, 72' m Cueto 75' m Con: Cipriani (1/1); Pen: Cipriani (2/2) 19', 32'	Report	Try: Walker 4' m Robshaw 24' c Yarde 27' m Care 39' m Con: Evans (1/4); Pen: Evans (1/1) 43'

AJ Bell Stadium
Attendance: 8,159
Referee: Wayne Barnes

25 April 2015
15:00

(1 BP) Gloucester	42–40	Newcastle Falcons (2 BP)
Try: Twelvetrees (2) 26' c, 69' c Robson 65' c Purdy 72' c Burns 80' m Con: Burns (4/5); Pen: Burns (3/4) 22', 33', 42'	Report	Try: M. Wilson (2) 12' c, 36' c Sinoti 18' c Furno 67' c Con: Clegg (4/4); Pen: Clegg (4/4) 30', 40', 51', 63'

Kingsholm
Attendance: 12,515
Referee: Ian Tempest

25 April 2015
15:00

(1 BP) Leicester Tigers	38–17	London Welsh
Try: B. Youngs 3' c Pearce (2) 42' m, 49' m Harrison 64' c Gibson 68' c T. Youngs 79' c Con: Burns (2/4); Bell (2/2)	Report	Try: Britton 38' c Fonua 73' c Con: Robinson (2/2); Pen: Elder (1/3) 27'

Welford Road
Attendance: 23,016
Referee: Tim Wigglesworth

25 April 2015
15:15

Northampton Saints	25–20	Saracens (1 BP)
Try: Manoa 18' c Con: Myler (1/1); Pen: Myler (6/8) 9', 12', 53', 58', 62', 72'	Report	Try: Wyles (2) 5' c, 13' c Con: Hodgson (2/2); Pen: Hodgson (2/3) 36', 47'

Stadium mk
Attendance: 27,411
Referee: Greg Garner

26 April 2015
14:00

Wasps	36–29	Exeter Chiefs (1 BP)
Try: Wade 1' c penalty try 40' c Simpson 75' c Con: Goode (3/3); Pen: Daly (1/1) 11'; Goode (4/5) 14', 25', 29', 53'	Report	Try: Chudley 4' c Waldrom 57' c Con: Slade (2/2); Pen: Slade (4/4) 13', 31', 34', 61'; Drop: Steenson (1/1) 80'

Ricoh Arena
Attendance: 16,712
Referee: Matthew Carley

=== Round 21 ===
8 May 2015
19:45

(1 BP) Harlequins	26–27	Bath
Try: Monye (2) 6' m, 60' m penalty try 37' c Con: Evans (1/3); Pen: Evans (3/3) 29', 51', 54'	Report	Try: Louw 20' c Agulla 42' c Houston 57' c Con: Ford (3/3); Pen: Ford (2/2) 17', 74'

Twickenham Stoop
Attendance: 14,800
Referee: Greg Garner

9 May 2015
14:00

(1 BP) Sale Sharks	34–28	Newcastle Falcons (1 BP)
Try: Cusiter 3' c Cueto 17' c Tuitupou 35' c Seymour 53' m Ioane 71' m Con: Cipriani (3/4); Pen: Cipriani (1/1) 23'	Report	Try: Powell 8' m Mayhew 66' c Socino 74' c Con: Socino (2/2); Pen: Clegg (3/3) 19', 29', 48'

AJ Bell Stadium
Attendance: 7,058
Referee: Matthew Carley

9 May 2015
15:00

Gloucester	35–13	London Irish
Try: May 30' c D. Thomas 69' m Purdy 72' m Con: Laidlaw (1/1); Pen: Laidlaw (6/7) 14', 34', 43', 53', 55', 65'	Report	Try: Lewington 27' m A. Short 80' m Pen: Noakes (1/1) 46'

Kingsholm
Attendance: 12,973
Referee: Craig Maxwell-Keys

9 May 2015
15:15

(1 BP) Northampton Saints	46–0	London Welsh
Try: Dickson (2) 13' c, 44' m Tuala 27' c Burrell (2) 61' c, 67' c Elliott 72' c Con: Myler (3/4); Wilson (2/2); Pen: Myler (2/2) 40', 43'	Report

Franklin's Gardens
Attendance: 13,362
Referee: Andrew Small

9 May 2015
15:15

(1 BP) Wasps	21–26	Leicester Tigers
Pen: Goode (6/7) 10', 19', 33', 36', 57', 65'; Lozowski (1/1) 75'	Report	Try: Morris 7' c Goneva 29' m Thompstone 71' m Con: Burns (1/3); Pen: Burns (3/3) 3', 15', 51'

Ricoh Arena
Attendance: 32,019
Referee: Wayne Barnes

10 May 2015
14:00

(1 BP) Saracens	20–24	Exeter Chiefs
Try: Ashton 13' c Wyles 20' c Con: Hodgson (2/2); Pen: Hodgson (1/1) 40'; Farrell (1/2) 53'	Report	Try: Cowan-Dickie 17' c Waldrom (2) 33' c, 70' c Con: Steenson (3/3); Pen: Steenson (1/1) 6'

Allianz Park
Attendance: 9,815
Referee: JP Doyle

=== Round 22 ===
16 May 2015
15:30

(1 BP) Bath	50–30	Gloucester (1 BP)
Try: Eastmond 9' c Ford 14' c Burgess 28' c Devoto 56' c Watson 63' m Rokoduguni 70' c Agulla 79' c Con: Ford (4/4); Homer (2/3); Pen: Ford (1/1) 46'	Report	Try: Ludlow 3' m McColl (2) 39' m, 59' c Robson 77' c Con: A. Thomas (2/4); Pen: A. Thomas (2/2) 24', 43'

The Recreation Ground
Attendance: 13,397
Referee: Dean Richards

16 May 2015
15:30

(1 BP) Exeter Chiefs	44–16	Sale Sharks
Try: Whitten 8' m Nowell 35' c White 44' c Jess (2) 57' m, 60' c Slade 64' m McGuigan 76' m Con: Steenson (3/7); Pen: Steenson (1/2) 2'	Report	Try: Beaumont (2) 31' m, 48' m Pen: Cipriani (2/2) 18', 25'

Sandy Park
Attendance: 12,642
Referee: Wayne Barnes

16 May 2015
15:30

Leicester Tigers	22–14	Northampton Saints
Try: Crane 12' m Morris 56' m Pen: Burns (3/3) 5', 41', 53'; Bell (1/1) 67'	Report	Try: Stephenson 74' m Pen: Wilson (3/3) 9', 17', 24'

Welford Road
Attendance: 24,000
Referee: Matthew Carley

16 May 2015
15:30

(1 BP) London Irish	40–40	Wasps (1 BP)
Try: Fenby 4' c Lewington 12' c Noakes 29' m J. Short 64' c A. Short 78' m Con: Geraghty (3/5); Pen: Geraghty (3/3) 38', 42', 70'	Report	Try: Thompson 10' c Tagicakibau (2) 24' m, 48' m Miller 50' c Haskell 74' c Con: Goode (3/5); Pen: Goode (3/4) 35', 40', 61'

Madejski Stadium
Attendance: 9,295
Referee: JP Doyle

16 May 2015
15:30

London Welsh	17–68	Saracens (1 BP)
Try: Reynolds 10' c Elder 31' c Con: Elder (2/2); Pen: Elder (1/1) 27'	Report	Try: B. Vunipola 4' c Strettle 14' c M. Vunipola 29' c Ashton (4) 39' m, 62' c, 65' c, 67' c Goode 43' c Figallo 59' c Hodgson 75' c Con: Farrell (9/10)

Kassam Stadium
Attendance: 3,633
Referee: Luke Pearce

16 May 2015
15:30

(1 BP) Newcastle Falcons	37–21	Harlequins
Try: Mayhew 2' m Lawson 51' c Blair 61' c Powell 71' c Saull 80' m Con: Catterick (3/4); Pen: Catterick (2/2) 10', 21'	Report	Try: Evans 27' c Yarde 55' m Con: Evans (1/2); Pen: Evans (3/3) 7', 22', 40'

Kingston Park
Attendance: 7,014
Referee: Thomas Foley

== Play-offs ==
As in previous seasons, the top four teams in the Premiership table, following the conclusion of the regular season, contest the play-off semi-finals in a 1st vs 4th and 2nd vs 3rd format, with the higher ranking team having home advantage. The two winners of the semi-finals then meet in the Premiership Final at Twickenham on 30 May 2015.

=== Bracket ===
Semi-finals
23 May 2015 – Franklin's Gardens
Northampton Saints	24
Saracens	29
23 May 2015 – The Recreation Ground
Bath	47
Leicester Tigers	10

Final
30 May 2015 – Twickenham
Bath	16
Saracens	28

=== Semi-finals ===
23 May 2015
14:00

Northampton Saints	24–29	Saracens
Try: Penalty try 13' c Wood 57' m Con: Myler (1/2) 14'; Pen: Myler (4/4) 27', 40', 44', 79'	Report	Try: Strettle 2' c George 47' c Con: Farrell (2/2) 3', 48'; Pen: Farrell (5/6) 24', 32', 53', 61', 77'

Franklin's Gardens
Attendance: 13,362
Referee: Greg Garner

Team details

FB	15	(Samoa) Ahsee Tuala	(substituted off) 3'
RW	14	(Samoa) Ken Pisi
OC	13	(Samoa) George Pisi
IC	12	(England) Luther Burrell
LW	11	(England) Jamie Elliott
FH	10	(England) Stephen Myler
SH	9	(England) Lee Dickson	(substituted off) 50'
N8	8	(United States) Samu Manoa
OF	7	(England) Calum Clark	(substituted off) 74'
BF	6	(England) Tom Wood (c)
RL	5	(England) Christian Day	(substituted off) 69'
LL	4	(England) Courtney Lawes
TP	3	(Australia) Salesi Ma'afu	(substituted off) 53'
HK	2	(England) Dylan Hartley	(substituted off) 68'
LP	1	(England) Alex Corbisiero	(substituted off) 32'
Replacements:
HK	16	(England) Mike Haywood	(substituted in) 68'
PR	17	(England) Alex Waller	(substituted in) 32'
PR	18	(England) Gareth Denman	(substituted in) 53'
LK	19	(England) Sam Dickinson	(substituted in) 74'
FL	20	(England) Jon Fisher	(substituted in) 69'
SH	21	(Samoa) Kahn Fotuali'i	(substituted in) 50'
FH	22	(New Zealand) James Wilson	(substituted in) 3'	(substituted off) 40'
CE	23	(England) Tom Stephenson		(substituted in) 40'
Coach:
(England) Jim Mallinder

FB	15	(England) Alex Goode
RW	14	(England) David Strettle		(substituted off) 59'
OC	13	(Scotland) Duncan Taylor
IC	12	(England) Brad Barritt
LW	11	(United States) Chris Wyles
FH	10	(England) Owen Farrell
SH	9	(England) Richard Wigglesworth
N8	8	(England) Billy Vunipola
OF	7	(Namibia) Jacques Burger
BF	6	(England) Maro Itoje		(substituted off) 16'	(substituted in) 23'	(substituted off) 65'
RL	5	(South Africa) Alistair Hargreaves (c)		(substituted off) 62'
LL	4	(England) George Kruis
TP	3	(South Africa) Petrus du Plessis		(substituted off) 59'
HK	2	(England) Jamie George
LP	1	(England) Mako Vunipola	(yellow card) 12'
Replacements:
HK	16	(South Africa) Jared Saunders
PR	17	(England) Richard Barrington		(substituted in) 16'	(substituted off) 23'
PR	18	(Argentina) Juan Figallo		(substituted in) 59'
LK	19	(Scotland) Jim Hamilton		(substituted in) 62'
FL	20	(England) Jackson Wray				(substituted in) 65'
SH	21	(South Africa) Neil de Kock
FH	22	(England) Charlie Hodgson
WG	23	(England) Chris Ashton		(substituted in) 59'
Coach:
(Ireland) Mark McCall

23 May 2015
17:00

Bath	47–10	Leicester Tigers
Try: Banahan (3) 1' c, 24' c, 75' c Eastmond 29' c Stringer 63' c Ford 68' m Watson 79' c Con: Ford (6/7) 2', 25', 30', 64', 76', 80'	Report	Try: T. Youngs 39' c Con: Burns (1/1) 40'; Pen: Burns (1/4) 23'

The Recreation Ground
Attendance: 13,349
Referee: JP Doyle

Team details

FB	15	(England) Anthony Watson	(yellow card) 32'
RW	14	(England) Semesa Rokoduguni
OC	13	(England) Jonathan Joseph
IC	12	(England) Kyle Eastmond		(substituted off) 67'
LW	11	(England) Matt Banahan
FH	10	(England) George Ford
SH	9	(Ireland) Peter Stringer		(substituted off) 71'
N8	8	(Australia) Leroy Houston	(yellow card) 33'	(substituted off) 56'
OF	7	(South Africa) Francois Louw
BF	6	(England) Sam Burgess		(substituted off) 53'
RL	5	(England) Dave Attwood		(substituted off) 58'
LL	4	(England) Stuart Hooper (c)		(substituted off) 51'
TP	3	(England) David Wilson		(substituted off) 47'
HK	2	(England) Ross Batty		(substituted off) 52'
LP	1	(Wales) Paul James		(substituted off) 22'	(substituted in) 32'	(substituted off) 45'
Replacements:
HK	16	(England) Rob Webber		(substituted in) 52'
PR	17	(England) Nick Auterac		(substituted in) 22'	(substituted off) 32'	(substituted in) 45'
PR	18	(England) Henry Thomas		(substituted in) 47'
LK	19	(Wales) Dominic Day		(substituted in) 51'
LK	20	(England) Matt Garvey		(substituted in) 53'
N8	21	(England) Carl Fearns		(substituted in) 60'
SH	22	(England) Chris Cook		(substituted in) 71'
FH	23	(England) Ollie Devoto		(substituted in) 67'
Coach:
(England) Mike Ford

FB	15	(Ireland) Niall Morris	(substituted off) 43'
RW	14	(England) Adam Thompstone
OC	13	(England) Mathew Tait	(substituted off) 67'
IC	12	(Samoa) Mat Luamanu
LW	11	(Fiji) Vereniki Goneva
FH	10	(England) Freddie Burns
SH	9	(England) Ben Youngs	(substituted off) 60'
N8	8	(England) Jordan Crane	(substituted off) 53'
OF	7	(Australia) Julian Salvi
BF	6	(England) Ed Slater
RL	5	(England) Graham Kitchener (c)	(substituted off) 70'
LL	4	(New Zealand) Brad Thorn
TP	3	(England) Dan Cole	(substituted off) 70'
HK	2	(England) Tom Youngs	(substituted off) 69'
LP	1	(Argentina) Marcos Ayerza	(substituted off) 70'
Substitutions:
HK	16	(England) Neil Briggs	(substituted in) 69'
PR	17	(Italy) Michele Rizzo	(substituted in) 70'
PR	18	(England) Fraser Balmain	(substituted in) 70'
LK	19	(South Africa) Sebastian de Chaves	(substituted in) 70'
FL	20	(England) Jamie Gibson	(substituted in) 53'
SH	21	(England) Sam Harrison	(substituted in) 60'
FB	22	(England) Tommy Bell	(substituted in) 43'
CE	23	(England) George Catchpole	(substituted in) 67'
Coach:
(England) Richard Cockerill

=== Final ===
30 May 2015
14:30

Bath	16–28	Saracens
Try: Joseph 51' c Con: Ford (1/1) 52'; Pen: Ford (3/3) 26', 44', 60'	Report	Try: Farrell 5' c George 13' m Wyles 31' c Con: Farrell (2/3) 6', 32'; Pen: Farrell (3/3) 21', 37', 62'

Twickenham Stadium
Attendance: 80,589
Referee: Wayne Barnes

Bath
Saracens

Team details

FB	15	(England) Anthony Watson	(substituted off) 9'
RW	14	(England) Semesa Rokoduguni
OC	13	(England) Jonathan Joseph
IC	12	(England) Kyle Eastmond
LW	11	(England) Matt Banahan
FH	10	(England) George Ford
SH	9	(Ireland) Peter Stringer	(substituted off) 67'
N8	8	(Australia) Leroy Houston	(substituted off) 60'
OF	7	(South Africa) Francois Louw
BF	6	(England) Sam Burgess
RL	5	(England) Dave Attwood	(substituted off) 58'
LL	4	(England) Stuart Hooper (c)	(substituted off) 54'
TP	3	(England) David Wilson	(substituted off) 49'
HK	2	(England) Ross Batty	(substituted off) 47'
LP	1	(Wales) Paul James	(substituted off) 47'
Replacements:
HK	16	(England) Rob Webber	(substituted in) 47'
PR	17	(England) Nick Auterac	(substituted in) 47'
PR	18	(England) Henry Thomas	(substituted in) 49'
LK	19	(Wales) Dominic Day	(substituted in) 54'
LK	20	(England) Matt Garvey	(substituted in) 58'
N8	21	(England) Carl Fearns	(substituted in) 60'
SH	22	(England) Chris Cook	(substituted in) 67'
FH	23	(England) Ollie Devoto	(substituted in) 9'
Coach:
(England) Mike Ford

FB	15	(England) Alex Goode
RW	14	(England) David Strettle	(substituted off) 60'
OC	13	(Scotland) Duncan Taylor
IC	12	(England) Brad Barritt	(substituted off) 69'
LW	11	(United States) Chris Wyles
FH	10	(England) Owen Farrell
SH	9	(England) Richard Wigglesworth	(substituted off) 55'
N8	8	(England) Billy Vunipola
OF	7	(Namibia) Jacques Burger
BF	6	(England) Maro Itoje	(substituted off) 70'
RL	5	(South Africa) Alistair Hargreaves (c)	(substituted off) 33'
LL	4	(England) George Kruis
TP	3	(South Africa) Petrus du Plessis	(substituted off) 49'
HK	2	(England) Jamie George	(substituted off) 53'
LP	1	(England) Mako Vunipola	(substituted off) 77'
Replacements:
HK	16	(South Africa) Schalk Brits	(substituted in) 53'
PR	17	(England) Richard Barrington	(substituted in) 77'
PR	18	(Argentina) Juan Figallo	(substituted in) 49'
LK	19	(Scotland) Jim Hamilton	(substituted in) 70'
FL	20	(England) Jackson Wray	(substituted in) 33'
SH	21	(South Africa) Neil de Kock	(substituted in) 55'
FH	22	(England) Charlie Hodgson	(substituted in) 69'
WG	23	(England) Chris Ashton	(substituted in) 60'
Coach:
(Ireland) Mark McCall

Man of the Match:
(England) Owen Farrell (Saracens)

== Leading scorers ==
Note: Flags indicate national union as has been defined under WR eligibility rules. Players may hold more than one non-WR nationality.

=== Most points ===
Rank	Player	Club	Points
1	(England) Andy Goode	Wasps	240
2	(England) Stephen Myler	Northampton Saints	236
3	(England) George Ford	Bath	219
4	(Ireland) Gareth Steenson	Exeter Chiefs	198
5	(England) Shane Geraghty	London Irish	164
6	(England) Danny Cipriani	Sale Sharks	163
7	(New Zealand) Nick Evans	Harlequins	162
8	(Scotland) Greig Laidlaw	Gloucester	159
9	(England) Freddie Burns	Leicester Tigers	153
10	(England) Charlie Hodgson	Saracens	152

=== Most tries ===
Rank	Player	Club	Tries
1	(England) Thomas Waldrom	Exeter Chiefs	16
2	(England) Chris Ashton	Saracens	13
2	(United States) Chris Wyles	Saracens	13
4	(England) Tom Arscott	Sale Sharks	12
4	(England) Alex Lewington	London Irish	12
4	(England) Christian Wade	Wasps	12
7	(England) Semesa Rokoduguni	Bath	10
7	(England) Tom Varndell	Wasps	10
9	(Samoa) Sinoti Sinoti	Newcastle Falcons	9
10	5 players tied		8

== Awards ==
The following received Player of the Month awards during the 2014–15 season, as selected by a panel of media commentators, in addition to monthly public polls.

Month	Nationality	Player	Position	Club
September	England	Kyle Eastmond	Centre	Bath
October	England	Semesa Rokoduguni	Wing	Bath
November	England	Thomas Waldrom	Number 8	Exeter
December	United States	Samu Manoa	Lock	Northampton
January	England	Jonathan Joseph	Centre	Bath
February	England	Henry Slade	Centre	Exeter
March	England	Elliot Daly	Centre	Wasps
April	England	Joe Simpson	Scrum-Half	Wasps
