= Nick Auterac =

English rugby union footballer

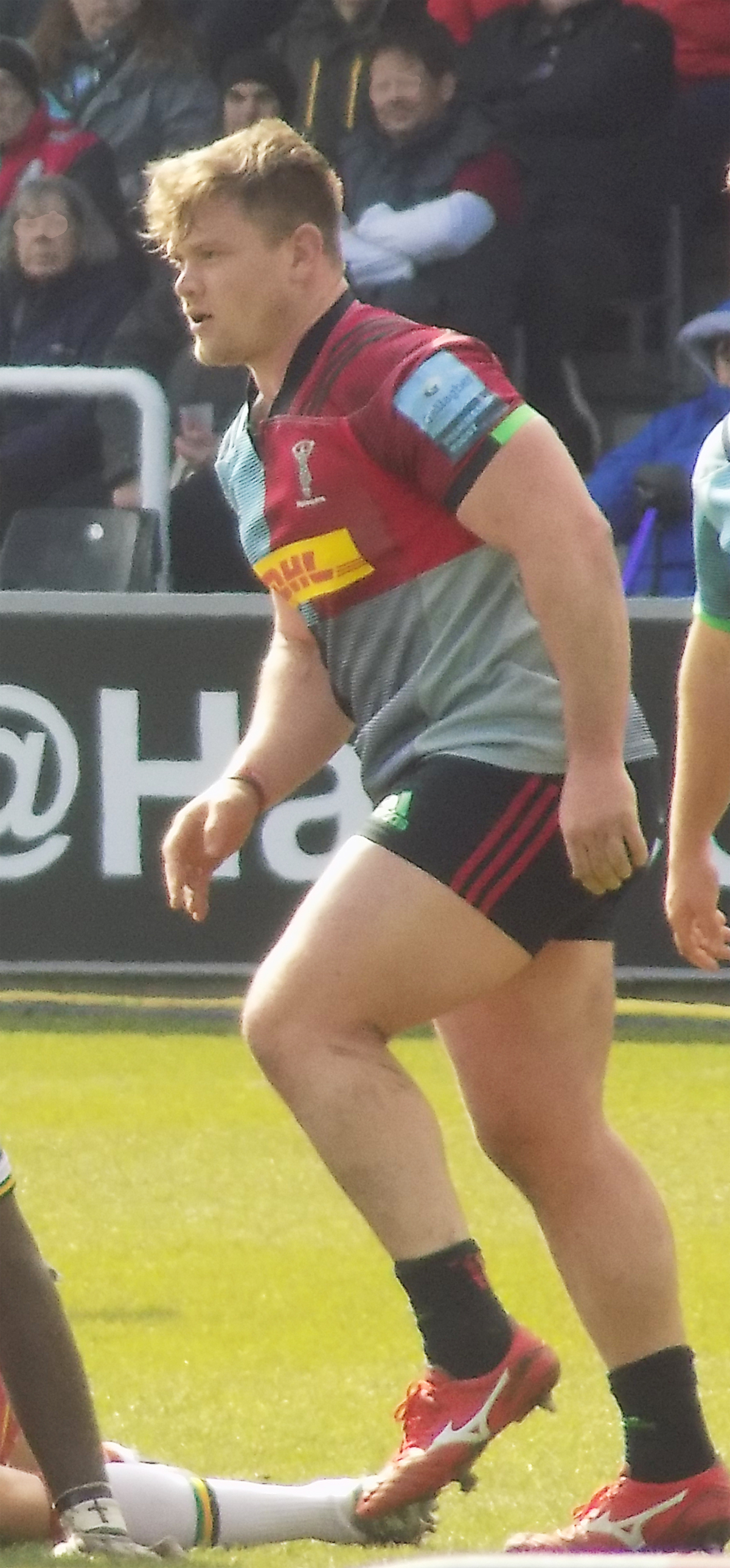
- Auterac in 2019
- Born: Nick Auterac; 12 November 1992 (age 34) Westminster, England
- Height: 1.82 m (6 ft 0 in)
- Weight: 120 kg (260 lb; 18 st 13 lb)
- School: Mill Hill School

Rugby union career
- Position: Prop
Senior career
Years	Team	Apps	(Points)
2011–2014	Saracens	18	(0)
2011–2012	→ London Scottish	8	(0)
2013–2014	→ Bedford Blues	9	(5)
2014–2018	Bath	80	(15)
2018–2020	Harlequins	23	(0)
2020–2022	Northampton Saints	30	(5)
2022–2023	Edinburgh Rugby	4	(0)
- Correct as of 26 April 2023
International career
Years	Team	Apps	(Points)
2012	England U20	2	(0)

Nick Auterac (born 12 November 1992) is an English former rugby union player who played as a prop.

== Club career ==
Auterac is a Saracens academy graduate. His lack of first team appearances at Saracens between 2011 and 2014 contributed to a 2014 move to Bath. He was a regular starter in Bath's successful 2014–15 Premiership Rugby season. Bath reached the league playoff final before being defeated by Auterac's former side Saracens.

On 14 November 2018 it was revealed that Auterac had agreed terms with Harlequins. Auterac went on to make his Quins debut in a Premiership Rugby Cup game against former club, Bath, in late October 2018.

On 21 January 2020, Auterac signed for Premiership rivals Northampton Saints from the 2020–21 season. In his first season at the club he played in the EPCR Challenge Cup quarter-final defeat against Ulster.

Auterac joined Edinburgh for the 2022–23 United Rugby Championship. After making only four appearances it was announced in April 2023 he would leave. Auterac subsequently retired from the sport and became a chef.

== International career ==
Auterac was a member of the England under-20 side that won the 2012 Six Nations Under 20s Championship.

Auterac qualified to represent Scotland due to his maternal grandmother and in June 2021 he was called up to the Scotland squad for Summer internationals. All these fixtures were cancelled due to Covid and he remained uncapped.
