= Luke Arscott =

English rugby union player

- Born: 7 July 1984 (age 42) Plymouth, England, UK
- Height: 1.85 m (6 ft 1 in)
- Weight: 106 kg (16 st 10 lb)
- Notable relative: Tom Arscott

Rugby union career
- Position: Fullback
Senior career
Years	Team	Apps	(Points)
2000–2003	Exeter Chiefs	5	(5)
2003–2006	Plymouth Albion	57	(57)
2006–2010	Bristol	82	(60)
2010–2014	Exeter Chiefs	98	(50)
2014–2016	Bath	9	(0)
2015-2016	Bristol Rugby (loan)	15	(5)
2016-2017	Bristol Rugby	0	(0)
- Correct as of 7 February 2015

Luke Arscott (born 7 July 1984 in Plymouth, Devon) is a rugby union player for Bristol Rugby in the RFU Championship.

His position of choice is as a full-back. He previously played for Plymouth Albion in National League 1, before joining Bristol for the 2006–07 season. In February 2010, Arscott extended his contract at Bristol However, he signed for Exeter Chiefs in June 2010, following Bristol's loss (to Exeter Chiefs) in the Championship final.

Arscott first started playing rugby for Devonport Services RFC in Plymouth before joining the Exeter Chiefs colts teams in 2000. He made his first team debut for Exeter Chiefs as a replacement in 2002. He went on to make four further appearances that season before joining Plymouth Albion.

On 3 June 2014 Luke joined Bath Rugby after leaving Exeter Chiefs. He was subsequently on loan from Bath Rugby to Bristol Rugby for the 2015–2016 season and rejoined Bristol on a permanent basis in the summer of 2016 on a 1-year contract.
