= Scott Waldrom =

- Full name: Scott Laurence Waldrom
- Born: 25 July 1980 (age 46) Lower Hutt, New Zealand
- Height: 1.82 m (6 ft 0 in)
- Weight: 95 kg (14 st 13 lb; 209 lb)
- School: St. Patrick's College
- University: CIT & WELTEC
- Notable relative: Thomas Waldrom (brother)
- Occupation: Land Manager for Steens Honey

Rugby union career
- Position: Flanker
- Current team: Avalon Wolves
Youth career
- Wainuiomata RFC
Senior career
| Years | Team | Apps | (Points) |
| 2002–2005 | Wellington | 23 | (40) |
| 2004 | Crusaders | 1 | (0) |
| 2005–2010 | Hurricanes | 30 | (15) |
| 2006–2012 | Taranaki | 73 | (60) |
| 2011–2012 | Chiefs | 14 | (15) |
- Correct as of 5 May 2018
International career
| Years | Team | Apps | (Points) |
| 2004–2008 | New Zealand Maori | 7 | (5) |
| 2008 | New Zealand | 1 | (0) |
| 2010 | New Zealand Barbarians | 1 | (0) |
- Correct as of 25 November 2017
National sevens team
| Years | Team | | Comps |
| 2002–2010 | New Zealand | | 7 |
Coaching career
- Years: Team
- 2016–2017: New Zealand Sevens

Scott Waldrom (born 25 July 1980) is a New Zealand former rugby union player. When Waldroms playing career finished in 2012 due to injury he was playing for the Waikato Chiefs in Super Rugby and Taranaki in the ITM Cup. He played in the openside flanker position.

== Biography ==
Raised in Wainuiomata, Waldrom attended school at St Patricks College Silverstream where he was Head of Sport, Deputy Head Boy and Captain of the 1st XV, which he was in for 3 years. While at college he was involved in the Wellington U16 secondary school B team and the Wellington secondary school A team. He also made the New Zealand secondary school track and field team for 300m hurdles in 1998. After leaving school he was involved in the first ever Wellington Rugby Academy and was selected for Wellington U19, Wellington U21 and Wellington B team.

The older brother of England international Thomas Waldrom, he played for the New Zealand sevens team and the New Zealand Maori. He became an All Black in late 2008, however he never played in a test match, although he did play in the historic rematch against Munster. He played 10 years as a professional starting off with the Wellington lions and represented the Crusaders and Hurricanes before Taranaki and the Chiefs.

Waldrom was forced into retirement due to a broken bone in his foot that required ongoing surgery as he continued playing, injury plagued Waldroms playing career and stopped him potentially playing a lot more at a higher level.

He has since moved into coaching and won the national championship 7s with Wellington before doing an int-rem year with the New Zealand 7s team on the world Series.

Waldrom is currently retired from coaching representative rugby but continues to be involved with his club Avalon as an assistant coach and playing in social vet tournaments throughout the world, he also has a podcast for New Zealand Rugby on their rugby toolbox website.
