= Thomas Waldrom =

England international rugby union player

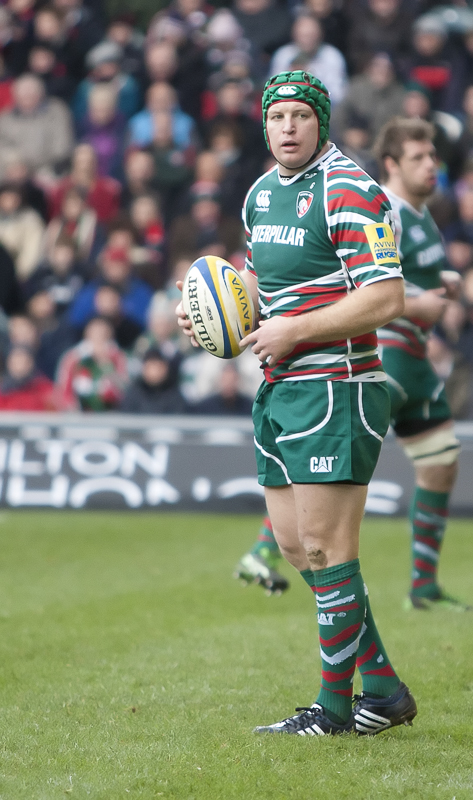
- Waldrom playing for Leicester
- Born: 28 April 1983 (age 43) Lower Hutt, New Zealand
- Height: 1.85 m (6 ft 1 in)
- Weight: 114 kg (17 st 13 lb)
- School: St. Patrick's College, Silverstream
- Notable relative: Scott Waldrom

Rugby union career
- Position: Number 8
Senior career
| Years | Team | Apps | (Points) |
| 2010–2014 | Leicester | 112 | (100) |
| 2014–2018 | Exeter Chiefs | 101 | (265) |
- Correct as of 11 March 2021
Provincial / State sides
| Years | Team | Apps | (Points) |
| 2001–2009 | Wellington | 80 | (60) |
| 2009–2010 | Hawke's Bay | 14 | (20) |
| 2018– | Wellington | | |
Super Rugby
| Years | Team | Apps | (Points) |
| 2004–2008 | Hurricanes | 30 | (25) |
| 2009–2010 | Crusaders | 26 | (20) |
International career
| Years | Team | Apps | (Points) |
| 2012–2014 | England | 5 | (0) |

Thomas Waldrom (born 28 April 1983) is a former rugby union player who played for Exeter Chiefs in the English Premiership and represented England from 2012 to 2014. Born in Lower Hutt, New Zealand, he qualified for England through his grandmother, winning four caps.

A number 8, Waldrom's early career was spent with his native Wellington provincial team, and the Hurricanes in Super Rugby. Following one season with the Crusaders, he moved to England in 2010 to play for Leicester Tigers. Waldrom made his England debut against South Africa in 2012. He spent four seasons with the Tigers, winning the 2013 Premiership.

Nicknamed "Thomas the Tank" due to his size and strength, he became a stalwart in the Chiefs team after moving to Exeter in 2014. They reached the 2016 Premiership final for the first time, before winning the 2017 Premiership.

== In New Zealand ==
=== Provinces ===
Waldrom made his Wellington Lions provincial debut in 2001 against Otago. He went on to play 80 games for Wellington at provincial level before moving to the Hawke's Bay for the 2009 season. Waldrom had become something of a fan favourite at McLean Park with his high work rate and powerful runs with the ball. In 2009 he helped the Magpies to a semi final, scoring 4 tries along the way.

=== Super Rugby ===
Waldrom made his Super Rugby debut in 2004 for the Hurricanes against the Stormers. He went on to play 30 caps for the Hurricanes before signing with the Crusaders for the 2009 season, where he would be a regular for one season.

== Move to England ==
=== Leicester Tigers ===
On 23 February 2010 English Champions Leicester Tigers announced the signing of Waldrom and that he would join the team at the conclusion of the 2010 Super Rugby season. Waldrom instantly became a firm favourite at Welford Road and was given the nickname "Thomas the tank engine", due to his size and rampaging runs to which he has taken to giving an arm gesture as if blowing a train engines horn when scoring a try.

Throughout his time at the Tigers, he played 103 matches and scored 17 tries. Having won his first Premiership title with the team in 2013, he was not offered a new contract past 2014.

=== Exeter Chiefs ===
==== 2014-15 ====
On 20 January 2014 Exeter Chiefs confirmed the signing of Waldrom to a 3-year contract. Waldrom marked his first Aviva Premiership appearance for Exeter with 2 tries in an Exeter Chiefs record Premiership winning margin. Waldrom scored a remarkable 16 tries during the 2014-15 season to end as the League's top try scorer as Exeter narrowly missed out on a play-off spot. This made him the first forward since Neil Back in the 1998-99 season to achieve this feat. He also helped Exeter's charge to the Challenge Cup Semi-Final that year.

==== 2015-16 ====
In December, Waldrom scored his first Premiership hat-trick in Exeter's 27–41 away win at Wasps. He would score another hat-trick against Worcester as he finished as top try scorer for a second year in a row in the Premiership. Exeter. Waldrom missed Exeter's first Premiership Final, a 28–20 loss to Saracens, due to a knee injury sustained against Wasps in the Semi-Final.

Waldrom scored two tries in Exeter's first Champions Cup Quarter-Final against Wasps. However, this was not enough to prevent Wasps securing a last-minute win. Despite his good form, Waldrom missed out on selection for Eddie Jones' first England squad.

==== 2016-17 ====
In the 2016-17 season Waldrom scored 9 tries in 20 appearances as Exeter finished in second position in the Aviva Premiership regular season. In the play-offs, Waldrom helped Exeter beat Saracens 18-16 to reach the final for a second year in a row, this time playing League toppers and 5 time Premiership champions Wasps. Exeter won 20-23 aet to be crowned champions of England for the first time.

==== 2017-18 ====
Due to the emergence of Sam Simmonds, Waldron's playing time has been limited in the 2017-18 season. This has not stopped Waldrom scoring 2 tries to bring his total to 40 Exeter Premiership tries.

On 4 February 2018, Waldrom confirmed that he would be returning to his native New Zealand at the end of the 2017–18 season, after four seasons at the Chiefs. He will rejoin his old province Wellington for the 2018 Mitre 10 Cup.

== England ==
Having discovered he was eligible to play for England in March 2011, Waldrom was named in the 45-man England training squad for the 2011 Rugby World Cup in New Zealand. Waldrom was initially cut from the 30-man squad, but an injury to prop Andrew Sheridan meant he was called in as an injury replacement during the World Cup final pool stages.

Waldrom did not make an appearance for England until the next year. He was selected as part of England's squad for their 2012 tour of South Africa. Having scored two tries in a mid-week match against SA Barbarians South, he was selected on the bench for the second test, coming on to replace Ben Morgan in the second-half. His first Test start came the next week in England's 14-14 third test draw. Waldrom's first Six Nations Championship appearance came in England's away win against Ireland in 2013.

Since Eddie Jones became England's coach in 2015, Waldrom has not been selected for the international squad.

== Club statistics ==
| Club | Season | League | | European | | Total | |
| | | Apps | Tries | Apps | Tries | Apps | Tries |
|---|---|---|---|---|---|---|---|
| Leicester Tigers | Premiership 2010–11 | 23 | 2 | 7 | 2 | 30 | 4 |
| Leicester Tigers | Premiership 2011-12 | 21 | 6 | 6 | 1 | 27 | 7 |
| Leicester Tigers | Premiership 2012-13 | 17 | 2 | 7 | 0 | 24 | 2 |
| Leicester Tigers | Premiership 2013-14 | 17 | 3 | 5 | 1 | 23 | 4 |
| | Total | 78 | 13 | 25 | 4 | 103 | 17 |
| Exeter Chiefs | Premiership 2014-15 | 22 | 16 | 5 | 1 | 27 | 17 |
| Exeter Chiefs | Premiership 2015-16 | 22 | 13 | 4 | 6 | 26 | 19 |
| Exeter Chiefs | Premiership 2016-17 | 20 | 9 | 5 | 3 | 25 | 12 |
| Exeter Chiefs | Premiership 2017-18 | 16 | 3 | 4 | 0 | 20 | 3 |
| | Total | 80 | 41 | 18 | 10 | 98 | 51 |
| Total | | 158 | 54 | 43 | 14 | 201 | 68 |

== Personal life ==
Born in Lower Hutt, New Zealand, Thomas the younger brother of former All Black Scott Waldrom.

As a teenager, Waldrom specialised in shot put, discus and hammer throwing, setting several school and club records in these sports.

The younger brother of former All Black Scott Waldrom, he was overlooked by the All Blacks selectors while playing in New Zealand, and after making his move to England, had aspirations of eventually playing for the England national team. Under International Rugby Board (IRB) regulations, he would not be eligible for England until being resident in the country for three years. In March 2011 Waldrom discovered his maternal grandmother was born in England, immediately making him eligible for selection to the National Team.
