= Rob Miller (rugby union) =

English rugby union player

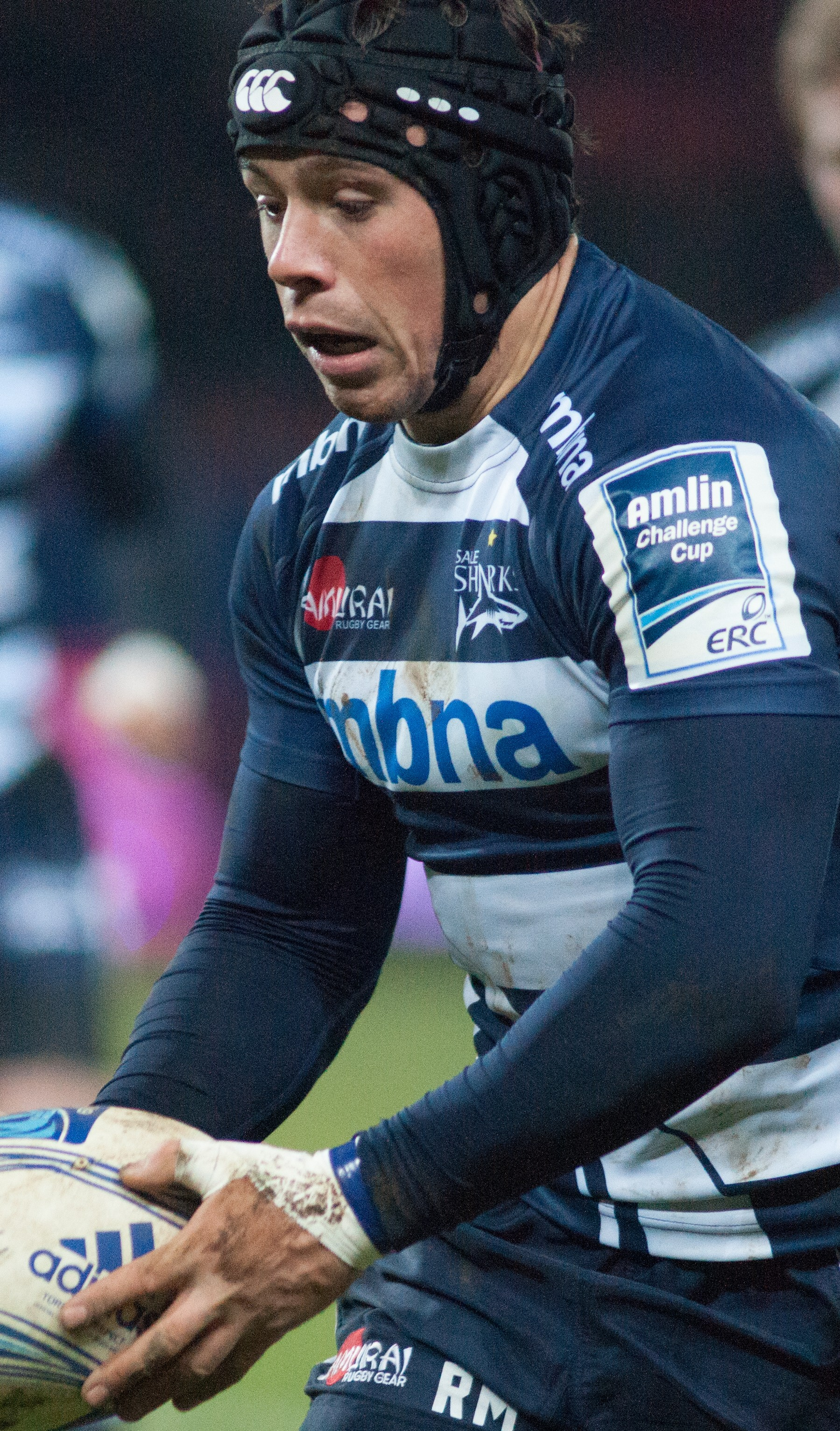
- Born: Robert Miller; 5 August 1989 (age 37) Carlisle, Cumbria, England
- Height: 1.80 m (5 ft 11 in)
- Weight: 86 kg (13 st 8 lb)
- School: Keswick School
- University: Northumbria University

Rugby union career
- Position: Fullback
Senior career
| Years | Team | Apps | (Points) |
| 2007–2008 | Tynedale | 29 | (265) |
| 2008–2010 | Newcastle Falcons | 42 | (67) |
| 2010–2014 | Sale Sharks | 105 | (230) |
| 2014– | Wasps | 135 | (220) |
International career
| Years | Team | Apps | (Points) |
| 2008–2009 | England U20 | 10 | (40) |

Robert Miller (born 5 August 1989) is an English former rugby union player who most recently played for Wasps. He plays at fullback. Miller was brought up in Bothel, Cumbria.

== Career ==
In the 2007/8 season, Miller was Tynedale's top try-scorer as they won promotion to National Division Two.

Miller made his Newcastle Falcons first team début in 2008, in a man-of-the-match winning performance against Bristol. In June 2010, Miller signed a three-year deal with Sale Sharks, where he has made a number of appearances, earning man-of-the-match status in two games. Sale had to compete with Bath Rugby for Miller's signature and Falcons had been keen to hang on to him.

Miller has won England Caps at Under-16s, Under 18s and Under 20 levels, helping England Under-20 to the Grand Slam in 2008, and the final of the IRB Under-20s World Cup in Wales.

In 2009, Miller appeared in the Under-20s World Cup final in Japan.

On 6 February 2014, Miller signed for the Wasps from the 2014-15 season.
