= Tom Arscott =

English rugby union footballer

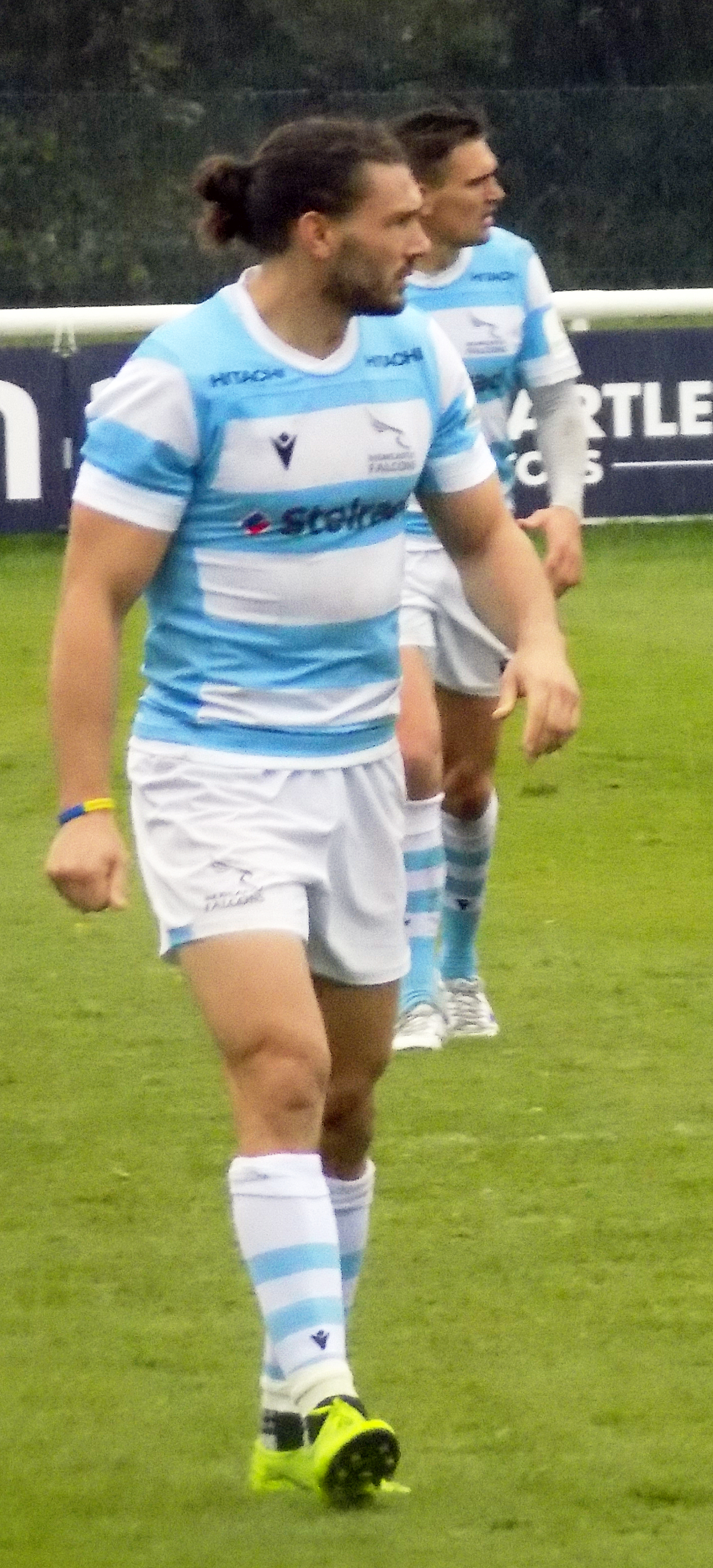
- Arscott in 2019
- Born: Thomas Arscott; 25 August 1987 (age 39) Plymouth, England
- Height: 1.86 m (6 ft 1 in)
- Weight: 90 kg (14 st 2 lb; 198 lb)
- Notable relative: Luke Arscott

Rugby union career
- Position(s): Wing, Fullback
Amateur team(s)
| Years | Team | Apps | (Points) |
| 2005–2007 | Plymouth Albion | 25 | (45) |
Senior career
| Years | Team | Apps | (Points) |
| 2007–2010 | Bristol Rugby | 37 | (34) |
| 2010–2012 | Worcester Warriors | 33 | (70) |
| 2012–2013 | London Welsh | 24 | (25) |
| 2013–2017 | Sale Sharks | 72 | (114) |
| 2017 | Yorkshire Carnegie | 6 | (0) |
| 2017–2018 | Rouen | 15 | (20) |
| 2018–2021 | Newcastle Falcons | 19 | (12) |
- Correct as of 6 September 2020
International career
| Years | Team | Apps | (Points) |
- England U19

Tom Arscott (born 25 August 1987) is a rugby union player most recently with Newcastle Falcons.

== Career ==
Arscott joined Bristol from Plymouth Albion before the start of the 2007–08 Guinness Premiership season, joining his brother Luke who had joined from the same team the season before.

He made an immediate impact, performing well in the pre-season friendlies impressing and then making his first competitive start in the Guinness Premiership at Sale before scoring in front of the home crowd the week after.

He joined Worcester Warriors in June 2010 but left in July 2012.

On 13 July 2012, Arscott joined newly promoted club London Welsh in the Aviva Premiership.

On 21 March 2013, Tom Arscott joined Sale Sharks from London Welsh to stay in the Aviva Premiership.

On 19 January 2017, Arscott had his contract terminated by Sale Sharks after an internal investigation found that he leaked confidential team information to Bristol before their Premiership game on 1 January. After leaving Sale, Arscott signed for Yorkshire Carnegie in the RFU Championship for the remainder of the 2016–17 season.

He then signed for third division club in France named Rouen who compete in Federale 1 for the 2017–18 season. On 18 April 2018, Arscott returned to England to sign for Newcastle Falcons from the 2018–19 season.

The 2018–19 season saw Arscott featuring at wing and full-back. A notable achievement playing a prominent part in Newcastle Falcon's reserves, reaching the A-League final in 2019. He was rewarded with a new contract in January 2020 but left the club over the Summer of 2021

== See also ==
- St Boniface's Catholic College
