= Tom Homer =

English rugby union player

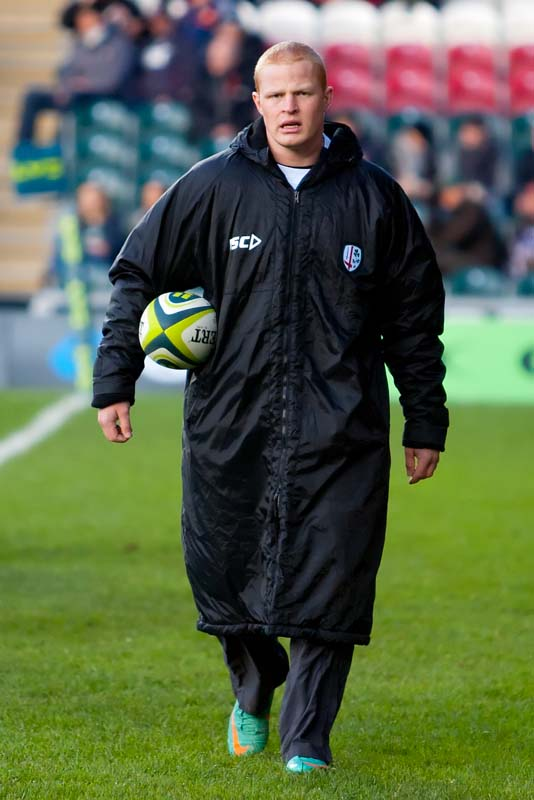
- Born: 1 April 1990 (age 36) Salisbury, Wiltshire, England
- Height: 1.78 m (5 ft 10 in)
- Weight: 91 kg (14 st 5 lb)
- School: Milton Abbey School

Rugby union career
- Position: Fullback/Wing
Amateur team(s)
Years	Team	Apps	(Points)
- Andover
Senior career
Years	Team	Apps	(Points)
2008–2015	London Irish	113	(767)
2015–2020	Bath Rugby	49	(166)
2020–2021	London Irish		
- Correct as of 28 July 2017
International career
Years	Team	Apps	(Points)
2008–2010	England U20	13	(141)

Tom Homer (born 1 April 1990) is an English former rugby union player who played at centre, wing and fullback for London Irish in Premiership Rugby. He was a member of the Grand Slam winning England U18 side in 2008 and was a member of the England U20 squad in January 2008.

== Career ==
Homer started playing rugby at Andover RFC in Hampshire before moving to Salisbury RFC in Wiltshire. Homer attended Norman Court Preparatory School and then Milton Abbey School in Dorset, where as a flyhalf, he was captain of rugby at both establishments.

== England ==
Homer was a regular for England at under-18 and 20 levels and is the all time leading scorer in the IRB Junior World Championships with 118 points.

=== London Irish ===
On leaving school, Homer signed to London Irish's academy. He signed a professional contract with the club in June 2008, making his debut against Worcester Warriors and scored his first tries for the club in their victory over Saracens on 23 November 2008. (during his debut, the speedy winger made an immediate impact scoring two tries against Saracens as an 18-year-old). He went on to score 51 points in 13 appearances that season. He continued to be an important member of the London Irish first-team squad over the next two season and in December 2010 signed a two-year deal with the Exiles.

Homer also kicked two penalties in the Exiles' 38–17 win over Worcester on 15 March 2009, and kicked eight from eight (six penalties and two conversions) against Northampton Saints on 22 March 2009. At the start of the 2012-13 Premiership campaign Homer stated he wanted to be known for more than just his kicking and was looking to get more involved and to use the opportunity of the attacking blueprint of coach Brian Smith to do so. Homer cites former England centre Mike Catt as a major influence.

=== Bath ===
On 23 January 2015, London Irish announced that Homer would leave the club at the end of the 2014-15 season on expiry of his contract. On 11 February 2015, Homer officially signed for Bath with immediate effect, following the departure of Gavin Henson to Bristol Rugby.

=== Return to London Irish ===
In July 2020 it was confirmed Homer had rejoined former club London Irish. In February 2021 it was announced Homer would leave London Irish to join French Pro D2 side Montauban ahead of the 2021–22 season. However, it was later confirmed he had retired with immediate effect.
