= Calum Clark =

England international rugby union player

- Born: 10 June 1989 (age 37) Stockton-on-Tees
- Height: 1.93 m (6 ft 4 in)
- Weight: 111 kg (17 st 7 lb; 245 lb)
- School: Barnard Castle School

Rugby union career
- Position: Flanker
Senior career
Years	Team	Apps	(Points)
2006–2010	Yorkshire Carnegie	70	(30)
2010–2017	Northampton Saints	147	(50)
2017–2020	Saracens	58	(10)
- Correct as of 4 March 2024
International career
Years	Team	Apps	(Points)
2009	England U20	3	(5)
2015	England	1	(0)
- Correct as of 4 March 2024

Calum Clark (born 10 June 1989 in Stockton-on-Tees, County Durham) is a former professional rugby union player who played for Yorkshire Carnegie, Northampton Saints and Saracens. His primary position was openside flanker.

== Early life and education ==
Calum Clark is the only son of Jane Clark and David Stevenson Clark, former Deputy Headteacher of Richmond School and Sixth Form College in Richmond, North Yorkshire. David was tragically killed on 21 September 2020 by cows whilst walking his dogs. Calum has two siblings, Hannah and Helen.

He was educated at Barnard Castle school.

== Rugby playing career ==
=== Club level ===
Clark came through the Leeds Carnegie youth academy, making his debut for the Yorkshire side in 2007.

The flanker made 23 appearances in his debut season at Leeds and was called up to the England U20s in 2008. Clark helped the national side to the 2008 IRB Junior World Championship (JWC) final and was back in the side the following season, this time as captain for both the Six Nations tournament and the JWC campaign where he led England to the final again.

Clark played for the Saints senior side on 30 September 2016 as the Midlands side beat Exeter Chiefs 20-19 and then went on to score his first try of the 2016/17 season against Montpellier Herault Rugby on 16 October.

In 2014 Clark started as Northampton beat Saracens to win the Premiership final.

On 17 January 2017, it was announced that Clark would make the move to Premiership rivals Saracens on a three-year contract from the 2017-18 season. He subsequently signed a further one-year contract.

==== Disciplinary record ====
In 2012, Clark was banned for 32 weeks, the longest ban in English rugby history at the time, for deliberately hyper-extending the arm of Leicester Tigers hooker Rob Hawkins causing a fractured elbow. Such an offence could have attracted an entry point of 5 years, however, the disciplinary panel found that whilst the offence itself was intentional, there was no evidence that Clark intended to cause a serious injury.

=== International level ===
Clark led the England Saxons side in 2014 against Irish Wolfhounds.

Clark was selected for the England 2015 Rugby World Cup training squad. He made his England debut when he started against France on 15 August 2015.

== Player support role ==
In 2021 it was announced that Clark would move to a player psychological support and development role at Saracens. Clark had undertaken post-graduate study in related areas.
