= Shane Geraghty =

England international rugby union player

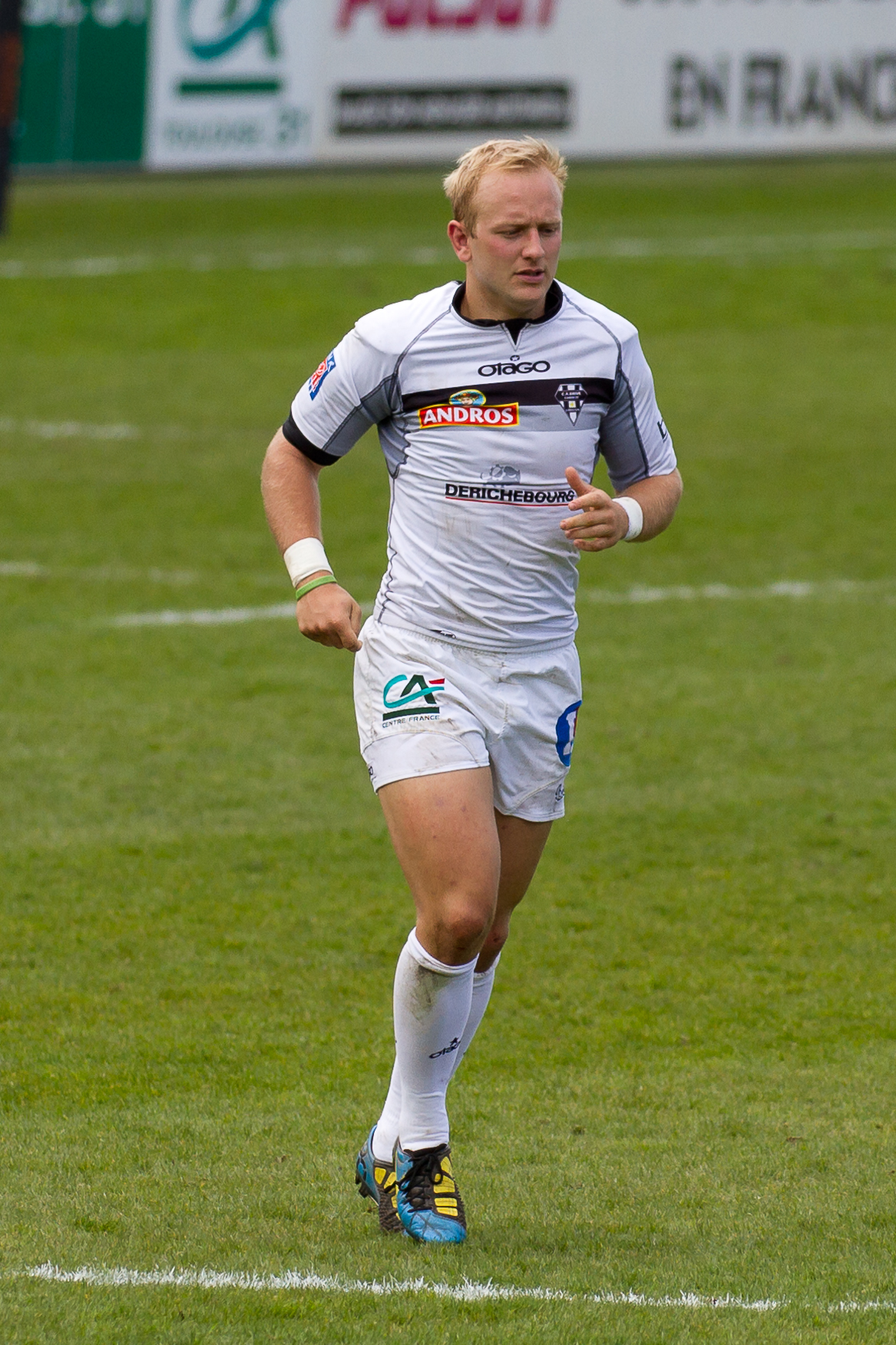
- Born: Shane Geraghty; 12 August 1986 (age 40) Coventry, England
- Height: 1.80 m (5 ft 11 in)
- Weight: 90 kg (14 st 2 lb; 198 lb)
- School: Bablake School
- Occupation: Rugby Player

Rugby union career
- Position: Fly-half / Centre
Senior career
Years	Team	Apps	(Points)
2004–2009	London Irish	71	(197)
2009–2011	Northampton Saints	38	(216)
2011	CA Brive		
2012–2016	London Irish	96	(413)
2016–2017	Bristol Rugby	1	(8)
2017–2018	Stade Français	9	(22)
International career
Years	Team	Apps	(Points)
2007–2009	England	6	(5)
- Correct as of 31 July 2017
National sevens team
Years	Team		Comps
2007	England		

Shane Geraghty (born 12 August 1986 in Coventry, West Midlands) is an English former rugby union player who played for teams including London Irish and Stade Francais. Geraghty played at centre or at fly-half.

== Early life ==
He attended Bablake School until 2002 and Colston's Collegiate School until 2004.

== Career ==
Coventry-born and able to play at both fly-half and inside centre, he progressed through the London Irish development system and made his senior club debut while still a member of the Exiles Academy, aged 18, in October 2004.

Geraghty was capped by England at U21 and A-level, before making the first of his six Test appearances off the bench against France in the 2007 Six Nations. He scored a penalty and a conversion on debut.

After 95 appearances in 5 seasons for London Irish, Shane joined Northampton Saints in July 2009 and was man-of-the-match in the club's historic Heineken Cup win over Munster, as well as picking up an Anglo-Welsh Cup winner's medal following a dramatic final against Gloucester. Geraghty was subsequently selected for England's 2010 summer tour of Australia and New Zealand, featuring in all 3 of the midweek matches.

Having scored 216 points in just under 40 matches for the Saints, he moved across the Channel to join French club CA Brive for the 2011/2012 season and played a key role as the side reached the semi-finals of the Amlin Challenge Cup.

In April 2012, it was announced that Geraghty would be returning to former club London Irish for the 2012/2013 season having signed a new two-year deal.

Having played no part in London Irish's opening 6 games in the 2016/17 RFU Championship, Geraghty was granted early release from his contract in order to join Bristol Rugby. He was released by Bristol at the end of the 2016–2017 season.

2017/18 season, Geraghty signed for Stade Francais in the French Top 14.

== Personal life ==
In 2013 Geraghty married Elizabeth Garnish of Epsom, Surrey.
