= Will Welch =

English rugby union player

William Welsh
- Born: William Andrew Welch; 3 April 1990 (age 36) Newcastle upon Tyne
- Height: 1.93 m (6 ft 4 in)
- Weight: 110 kg (17 st 5 lb; 243 lb)
- School: Royal Grammar School Newcastle

Rugby union career
Senior career
Years	Team	Apps	(Points)
2009–2023	Newcastle Falcons	275	(55)
- Correct as of 26 June 2023

William Welch (born 3 April 1990) is an English retired rugby union player and former captain for Newcastle Falcons in the Gallagher Premiership; his position of choice is at Openside Flanker. He is a product of the Newcastle Falcons Junior Academy and signed for the First XV in 2009 after representing Blaydon RFC at a National Two Level.

In July 2008, Welch represented England under 18's National Rugby Union team in Argentina. He also represented England at under 19's level and was selected as part of the 32 man England under 20 elite player squad, taking part in the RBS U20 Six Nations IRB Junior World Championship.
