= Ross Batty =

English rugby union player

- Born: 20 September 1986 (age 40) North Tyneside, England
- Height: 1.85 m (6 ft 1 in)
- Weight: 102 kg (16 st 1 lb)

Rugby union career
- Position: Hooker
- Current team: Bath
Senior career
Years	Team	Apps	(Points)
2006–2009	Newcastle Falcons	4	(0)
2009–2010	Rotherham Titans	18	(5)
2010-	Bath	112	(30)
- Correct as of 4 June 2019

Ross Batty (born 20 September 1986, in England) a former Barnard Castle School pupil, is an English rugby union player whose primary position is hooker. Batty is currently at Bath in Premiership Rugby.

A regular in the scrum for Bath after joining from Rotherham in 2010. Batty celebrated his 150th appearance for the Somerset side, on 2 February 2018. The record takes into account cup matches.

On 25 April 2019 Batty renewed his contract with Bath. The Bath regular agreed on an 'undisclosed-length' contract. With the club he had spent nine seasons with, at the end of the 2018–2019 season. He will retire on medical grounds at the end of the 2020–21 season.
