= Ruki Tipuna =

New Zealand rugby player (born 1983)

- Born: Te Ruki R.W. Tipuna; 11 May 1983 (age 43) Tauranga, New Zealand
- Height: 1.65 m (5 ft 5 in)
- Weight: 72 kg (159 lb; 11.3 st)

Rugby union career
- Position: Scrum-half
Amateur team(s)
Years	Team	Apps	(Points)
- Portadown RFC
–	Perthbayswater RUFC		
Senior career
Years	Team	Apps	(Points)
2011	Scarlets	6	(0)
2011−14	Bristol	59	(38)
2014−16	Newcastle Falcons	33	(20)
Provincial / State sides
Years	Team	Apps	(Points)
2004, 2008	Bay of Plenty	12	(10)
2010	Wellington	3	(0)
2016−	Bay of Plenty	9	(0)
- Correct as of 21 October 2016
International career
Years	Team	Apps	(Points)
- Maori All Blacks
National sevens team
Years	Team		Comps
- New Zealand

Ruki Tipuna (born 11 May 1983) is a New Zealand rugby union footballer who has played for Aviva Premiership side Bristol Rugby, Bay of Plenty Steamers, the Hurricanes, Portadown RFC and Scarlets. His position is at scrum-half.

Tipuna has also represented the New Zealand Sevens and New Zealand Māori teams.

In August 2011, Tipanu joined the Scarlets on a short-term contract, before joining Bristol in November. He immediately became first choice scrum-half at Bristol. On 28 March 2014, Tipuna made his move to the Aviva Premiership with Newcastle Falcons on a two-year contract from the 2014-15 season.

Ruki Tipuna is a former student of Tauranga Intermediate School and now is a teacher there.
