= Joe Simpson (rugby union, born 1988) =

England international rugby union player

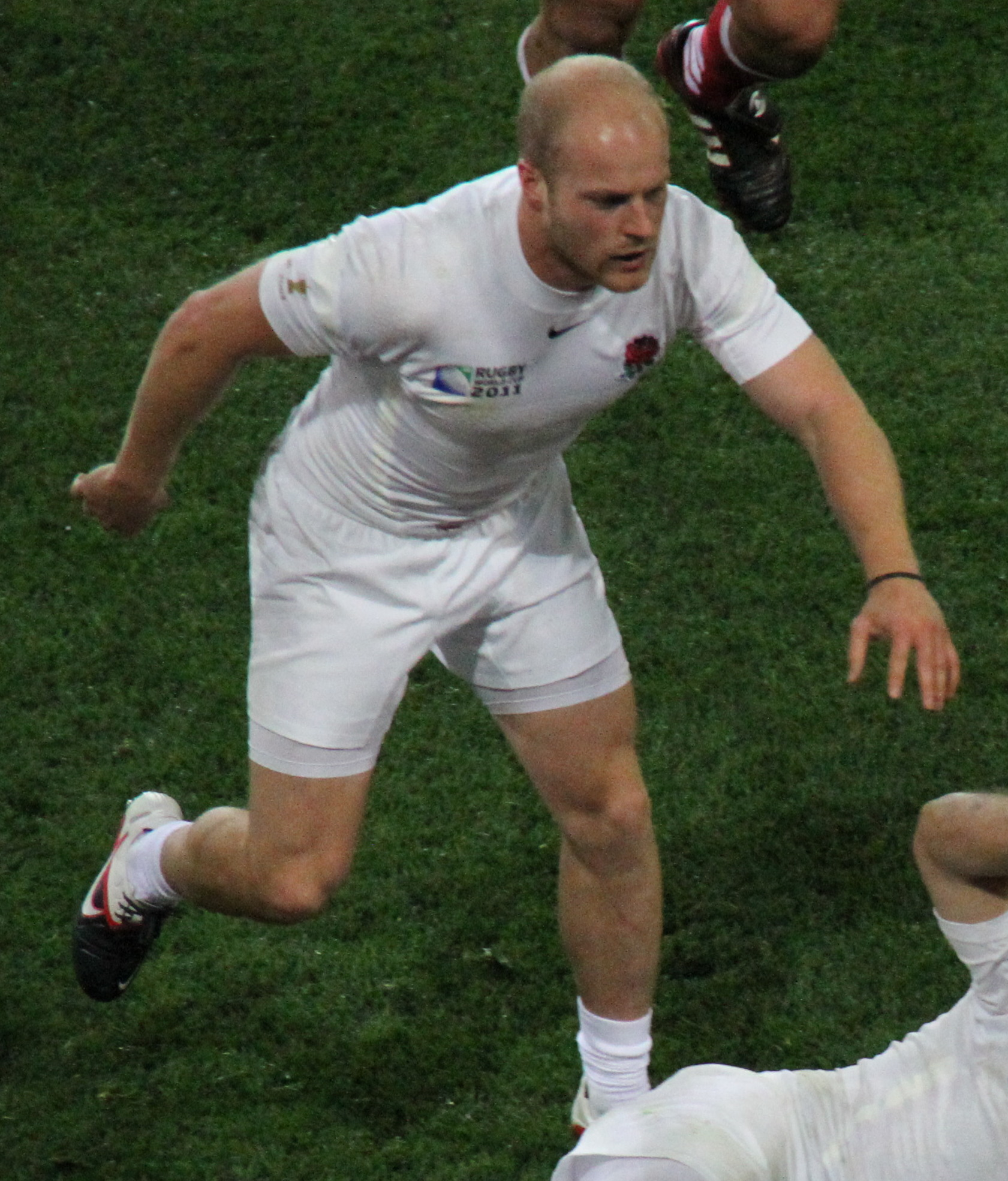
- Simpson with England vs Georgia at 2011 Rugby World Cup
- Born: Joe Simpson; 5 July 1988 (age 38) Sydney, Australia
- Height: 1.8 m (5 ft 11 in)
- Weight: 82 kg (12 st 13 lb)
- School: St Benedict's School
- University: London School of Economics

Rugby union career
- Position: Scrum-half
Senior career
Years	Team	Apps	(Points)
2006–2019	Wasps	230	(207)
2006–2008	→Blackheath (loan)	24	(80)
2019–2022	Gloucester	29	(55)
2021	→Saracens (loan)	1	(0)
2021-2022	→Bath (loan)	5	(5)
2022	Sale Sharks		
- Correct as of 31 January 2022
International career
Years	Team	Apps	(Points)
2011	England	1	(0)
- Correct as of 29 May 2016
National sevens team
Years	Team		Comps
2016	Great Britain 7s		1

Joe Simpson (born 5 July 1988) is a rugby union player who plays scrum half who plays for Sale Sharks in the Premiership Rugby. He most recently played for Gloucester, between 2006 and 2019 he played 230 times for Wasps, in 2011 he played one international for England and was named in the 2011 Rugby World Cup squad. He has also represented Team GB in rugby sevens.

== Early life ==
Simpson was born in Australia to a New Zealand mother and English father, both rugby enthusiasts. He has one younger brother called Michael.

Simpson was educated at St Benedict's School, Ealing, which he represented at both rugby and cricket and where he was honoured as Victor Ludorum for athletics three times, at junior, middle and senior school levels. Outside school he played cricket for Ealing Cricket Club and played with Hugo Ellis and Dominic Waldouck, in the youth team at Richmond Rugby Club.

== Club career ==
Simpson joined the Wasps England Rugby Academy full-time from St Benedict's School in the summer of 2006, but spent much of the subsequent two years at Blackheath Rugby Club on loan.

In the 2008/09 season, Simpson graduated to the Wasps first team, coming on as a substitute a number of times and gaining a more frequent position in the starting XV towards the latter part of the season. He scored on his debut and was awarded fourth place in the Guinness Premiership Try of the Season award.

Simpson signed a full-time senior contract with Wasps in the summer of 2009 securing his place at the club for two years. He was in the starting line-up for the opening game of the season on 5 September 2009 against Harlequins, played at Twickenham as part of the London Double Header. In the first minute Simpson was head-butted by George Robson, the Harlequins' lock, in an off-the-ball incident. After treatment on the field for a cut sustained to his nose Simpson continued to play for the remaining 79 minutes, despite feeling sick and dizzy.

On 17 December 2010, Wasps announced that Simpson had signed a three-year extension to his contract which will keep him at the club until the end of the 2013/14 season.

Simpson underwent surgery after suffering an ankle injury in Wasps' 51-10 European Champions Cup win over Leinster on 23 January 2016.

"It is obviously disappointing for everyone that Joe has had to undergo surgery on his ankle, especially at a time when he was playing so well. I'm sure he was knocking on the door for international recognition." said Wasps boss Dai Young.

Simpson's injury, just a week before the start of the Six Nations, ends any hopes he might have had of getting an England recall this season under new coach Eddie Jones. This is Simpson's second major injury in less than a year, having been stretchered off in the 26–21 home defeat by Leicester in May 2015 with a medial collateral ligament blow, dashing his hopes of making the World Cup squad.

On 6 February 2019, it was confirmed that Simpson would move to Gloucester in time for the 2019–20 season.

In September 2021, Saracens announced Simpson would join them on a one-month loan deal from Gloucester to provide additional cover following Ivan van Zyl suspension as well as Ruben de Haas being away on international duty. This was followed by a three-month loan to Bath.

After he left Gloucester, it was confirmed on 20 July 2022, that he signed a six-month deal to join Sale Sharks from the 2022–23 season. Following this he will retire from rugby.

Simpson has since turned out for Old Priorian RFC (formed from the old boys of St Benedict's School) 2nd XV, and played alongside his brother Michael as part of an Invitational XV versus an Ealing Trailfinders Academy XV managed by Jonah Holmes.

== International career ==
In May 2006, Simpson earned his first cap in the England Under 19 team, playing against Wales.

In the 2007/08 season, he secured a place with the England sevens' side, travelling to Dubai for the IRB World Seven Series tournament, and was also named in the England Under 20s squad. At the end of the season, he was nominated for the 'IRB Young Player of the Year Award' for his performance in the IRB Junior World Championship in June 2008.

In June 2009, Simpson progressed into the England Saxons squad and travelled with Wasps' teammates Dom Waldouck and Danny Cipriani to play in the Churchill Cup in Colorado. On his debut he completed a solo try and was awarded Man of the Match and appeared twice more during the tournament (in which the Saxons lost the final to Ireland A), coming on as a substitute.

Following his performance at the 2009 Churchill Cup, Simpson was selected for the 2009/10 squad for the England Saxons national rugby union team.

On 11 May 2010, Simpson was one of nine uncapped players named in the England senior squad to tour Australia and New Zealand in the summer and on 30 May he made his debut for England, coming on as a substitute for David Strettle with nine minutes remaining in the match against the Barbarians. However, having sustained an injury to his left hamstring in the Barbarians game the RFU announced that Simpson would have to pull out of the tour.

On 12 January 2011, it was announced that Simpson had been called up to the senior England squad (EPS) for the 6 Nations tournament.

On 22 August 2011, Simpson was named in the 30-man England squad heading to New Zealand for the 2011 Rugby World Cup, the opportunity arising following an injury to Danny Care. On 18 September 2011, Simpson replaced Ben Youngs in the 66th minute against Georgia in the pool stages of the Rugby World Cup 2011 to win his long anticipated first cap. He was only the third player to win his first cap for England in a Rugby World cup tournament – first was Richard West v Manu Samoa at RWC 1995, Joe Worsley who was the 2nd player to do so at the 1999 Rugby World Cup.
