= Matt Jess =

- Born: Matthew Steven Jess; 4 April 1984 (age 42) Coventry, England, United Kingdom
- Height: 1.80 m (5 ft 11 in)
- Weight: 90 kg (14 st 2 lb; 198 lb)

Rugby union career
- Position: Wing
- Current team: Whitland R.F.C.
Senior career
Years	Team	Apps	(Points)
2003-2006	Cornish Pirates	77	
2006-2007	Newport Gwent Dragons		
2007-2008	Cornish All Blacks		
2008–2017	Exeter Chiefs		(103)
2017-2021 Whitland 2022- present	Newton Abbot		
International career
Years	Team	Apps	(Points)
- England Counties Cornwall

Matt Jess (born 4 April 1984) is a rugby union player who most notably played for Exeter Chiefs in the Aviva Premiership. His position of choice was Wing. Matt made his debut against Moseley in 2008. He attended Cape Cornwall School in St Just, Cornwall.

Despite being born in Coventry, Jessy spent the majority of his youth in Cornwall and considers himself Cornish and is even branded as the "Heamoor Flyer". Jess joined Exeter on 28 May 2008, signing from Launceston. Jess played his 100th game for Exeter against Worcester Warriors in March 2013.

He is currently playing for Taunton R.F.C.
