= Chris Cook (rugby union) =

English rugby union player

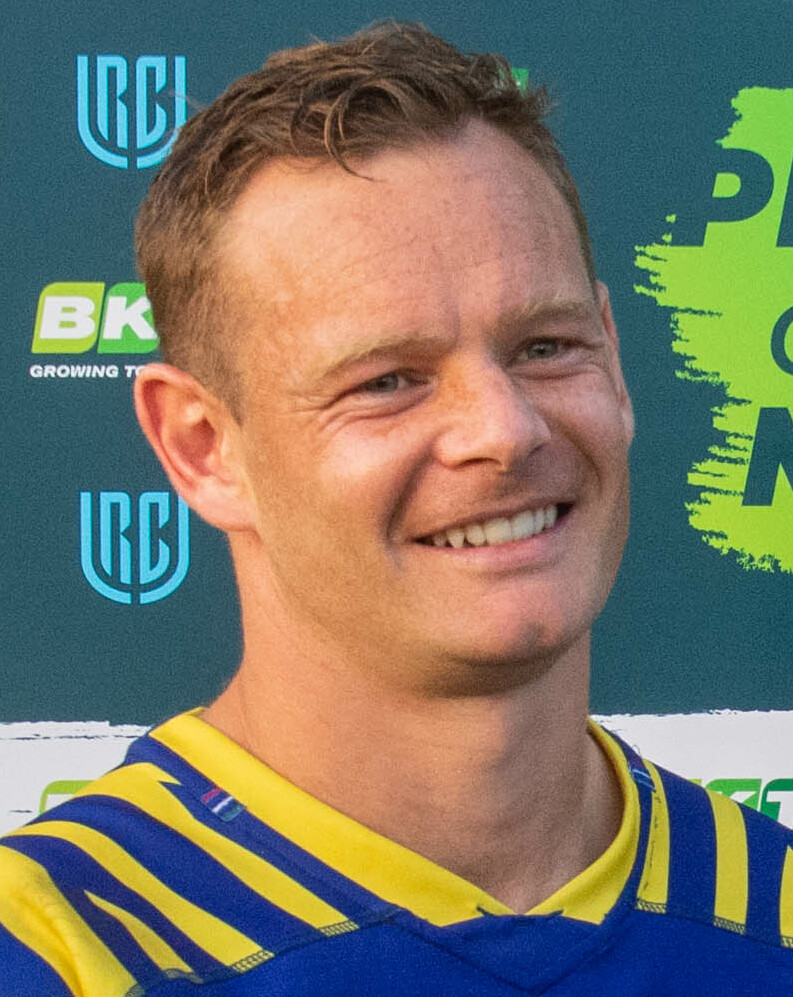
- Cook in 2022
- Born: Christopher John Cook; 16 April 1991 (age 35) Bath, England
- Height: 1.78 m (5 ft 10 in)
- Weight: 96 kg (15 st 2 lb)
- School: Millfield School

Rugby union career
- Position: Scrum-half
- Current team: Chippenham RFC
Senior career
Years	Team	Apps	(Points)
2009−2020	Bath	143	(88)
2011	→Esher	3	(5)
2014	→London Welsh	10	(5)
2020–2021	Bristol Bears	2	(0)
2021–2022	Northampton Saints	0	(0)
2022–2023	Zebre Parma	19	(15)
2023-present	Chippenham RFC		
- Correct as of 22 Apr 2023
International career
Years	Team	Apps	(Points)
2011	England U20	9	(0)
2019	England Sevens	5	(19)
- Correct as of 26 June 2011

Chris Cook (born 16 April 1991) is an English rugby union player, who currently plays at scrum-half for Chippenham RFC in Regional 2 Tribute Severn South West Division.

== Career ==
A product of the Bath Rugby academy, Cook made his Aviva Premiership debut as a substitute against Sale Sharks. He spent the first half of the 2013–14 season playing for Bath's "A" team, before being loaned out to promotion hopefuls London Welsh.

Cook returned to Bath for the 2014–15 season on a new one-year deal, starting his first Premiership game in their second match of the season, against his former team London Welsh. Cook scored the game's first try, and his first in a Premiership campaign, within two minutes.

After 11 seasons playing for Bath, Cook announced he was leaving Bath to sign for local rivals Bristol Bears from the 2020–21 season.

On 26 July 2021, Cook signs for Premiership rivals Northampton Saints on a short-term deal from the beginning of the 2021–22 season.

After playing for England U20 in 2011, in 2019 Cook was named in the England Sevens squad.

On 20 January 2022, Cook left England to join Italy region Zebre Parma in the United Rugby Championship on a short-term deal for the remainder of the 2021–22 season. After the renew of contract, he played for the Italian team also in the 2022−23 season. Before moving back to the UK to take up a player/coach role at Chippenham Rugby Club.
