= Sinoti Sinoti =

Samoa international rugby union player

- Born: Sinoti To'omaga Sinoti; 9 September 1985 (age 41) Wellington, New Zealand
- Height: 1.74 m (5 ft 9 in)
- Weight: 100 kg (15 st 10 lb; 220 lb)
- Notable relative: Jerry Collins (cousin)
- Occupation: professional rugby player

Rugby union career
- Position: Wing
Senior career
Years	Team	Apps	(Points)
2008–2009	Toulon	20	(40)
2009–2010	Castres Olympique	2	(0)
2010–2011	Hawke's Bay	12	(20)
2011–2012	Aironi	25	(20)
2012–2013	Zebre	19	(15)
2013	Wellington	1	(5)
2013−2020	Newcastle Falcons	94	(100)
- Correct as of 16 November 2020
International career
Years	Team	Apps	(Points)
2010−2018	Samoa	9	(5)
- Correct as of 25 October 2018

Sinoti Sinoti (born 9 September 1985) is a New Zealand-born Rugby Union footballer. He is now retired but played for the Samoa national rugby union team.

== Club career ==
Prior to the start of the 2008–09 season Sinoti began his professional career with French club Toulon, playing in the same team as cousin Jerry Collins. Following a two-year spell in France, including a spell with Castres Olympique, he returned to New Zealand, and played for Hawkes' Bay in the National Provincial competition.

In September 2011 he signed a contract to play with Italian team Aironi. Following the demise of Aironi due to financial problems, he joined up with the replacement Italian representatives in the Pro 12 league, Zebre. He left Zebre at the end of the 2012/13 season, and joined Wellington for the 2013 ITM Cup campaign.

On 24 December 2013, Sinoti signed for English side Newcastle Falcons in the Aviva Premiership for the 2013–14 season. He quickly became a fan favourite due to his footwork, determination and aggression on the pitch, as well as his friendly and joking manner off the pitch.

In January 2018, he was awarded Try of the Week for his week-13 try against London Irish.

He left Newcastle for personal reasons with immediate effect on 16 November 2020.

== International career ==
On 30 October 2010 Sinoti made his test debut for Samoa, against Japan.

An injury sustained on international duty saw Sinoti miss the Rugby World Cup 2015 in England.

In summer 2018, he was recalled to join the Samoa national rugby team that beat Germany to qualify for a place in the Rugby World Cup 2019 in Japan.
