= Semesa Rokoduguni =

England international rugby union player

LCpl Semesa Rokoduguni
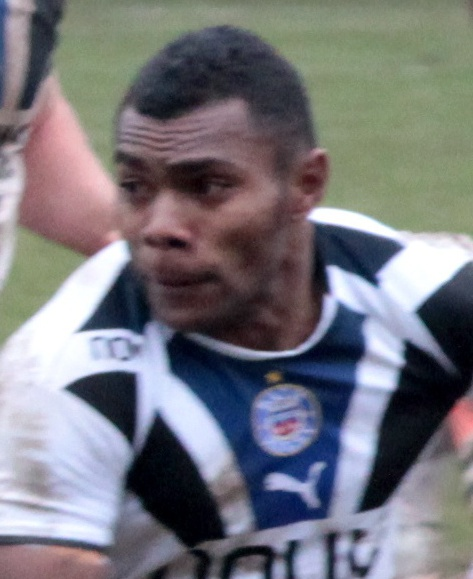
- Born: 28 August 1987 (age 39) Nausori, Fiji
- Height: 1.84 m (6 ft 0 in)
- Weight: 98 kg (15 st 6 lb; 216 lb)

Rugby union career
- Position(s): Centre, Wing
Amateur team(s)
Years	Team	Apps	(Points)
2011–2012	British Army		
Senior career
Years	Team	Apps	(Points)
2012–2022	Bath	194	(355)
2022–2024	US Montauban	45	(50)
2024-	Doncaster Knights	11	(15)
- Correct as of 5 August 2024
International career
Years	Team	Apps	(Points)
2014–2017	England	5	(20)
- Correct as of 25 November 2017

Lance corporal Semesa "Roko" Rokoduguni (born 28 August 1987) is a professional rugby union player for Doncaster Knights in England RFU Championship, previously playing for English club Bath. Rokoduguni is also an actively serving soldier in the British Army, and notably served in Afghanistan.

He won four caps for England between 2014 and 2017. Born in Fiji he qualified for England on residency while serving in the Army.

== Club career ==
=== Lytchett Minster RFC ===
Rokoduguni joined LMRFC in Feb 2008 while training with the army at Semesa camp.

Rokoduguni played for just over a season playing in the centre where he scored many tries and helped the club gain promotion to Hampshire 1

=== Army RU ===
Rokoduguni has represented the Army Rugby Union XV, and German Rugby-Bundesliga team DRC Hannover. He represented the army twice in the 2011–2012 season, scoring four tries against the RAF and three against the Navy.

He has also represented the Army Sevens team in the Middlesex Sevens and the International Defence Sevens, the latter of which was won by the Army.

=== Bath Rugby ===
In October 2012, it was announced that Rokoduguni had been signed on a senior contract with Bath after impressing for their second side, Bath United.

Rokoduguni made his debut for the Bath senior team on 10 November 2012, in their LV= Cup match against Newport Gwent Dragons. He scored a try after just 9 minutes, and finished the game with two tries.

In May 2015, Rokoduguni started on the wing as Bath made the Premiership final against Saracens. Although he did not score in the final, he appeared to be through for a chance after a chip and chase before being illegally taken out, off the ball, by Alex Goode. Bath went on to finish runners up, losing 28–16.

=== Montauban ===
On 17 June 2022, after 10 years at Bath, Rokoduguni would leave The Rec to join French side Montauban in the Pro D2 competition from the 2022–23 season. He spent two seasons with the South-French side, finishing 13th and 15th, and narrowly staying in the Pro D2 league, beating RC Narbonne 20–19.

=== Doncaster Knights ===
On 11 July 2024, Rokoduguni was announced as signing for South Yorkshire rugby club, Doncaster Knights.

== International career ==
In January 2014, he was included in a 25-member England Saxons squad to prepare for the upcoming match against the Irish Wolfhounds.

On 8 November 2014, Rokoduguni made his Test debut for England, losing to New Zealand 21–24 as part of the 2014 Autumn Internationals. He was the first serving British soldier to play for England since Tim Rodber in 1999. In 2015 Rokoduguni was called up into the England Rugby World Cup Squad, after David Strettle completed his move to French-based side Clermont.

=== International tries ===
As of 7 July 2019

Try	Opposing team	Location	Venue	Competition	Date	Result	Score
1	Fiji	London, England	Twickenham Stadium	2016 Autumn Internationals	19 November 2016	Win	58 – 15
2	Fiji	London, England	Twickenham Stadium	2016 Autumn Internationals	19 November 2016	Win	58 – 15
3	Argentina	London, England	Twickenham Stadium	2017 Autumn Internationals	11 November 2017	Win	21 – 8
4	Samoa	London, England	Twickenham Stadium	2017 Autumn Internationals	25 November 2017	Win	48 – 14

== Personal life ==
Rokoduguni is a sniper of the Royal Scots Dragoon Guards in the British Army. He joined the Army in 2007 and was deployed to Afghanistan as part of Operation Herrick in 2011 where he was attached to 4th Battalion, The Royal Regiment of Scotland (4SCOTS).

His great-great-grandfather, great-grandfather and father all served in the military.

Semesa's brother, Rupeni Rokoduguni, is also in the British Army serving in Black Watch near Inverness. He also has a similar passion for rugby and currently plays for Highland Rugby Club.
