= Jamie Elliott (rugby union) =

English rugby union player

- Born: James Harry Elliott; 31 August 1992 (age 34) Bedford, England
- Height: 1.80 m (5 ft 11 in)
- Weight: 89 kg (14 st 0 lb)
- School: Bedford School

Rugby union career
- Position: Wing/Centre
Senior career
Years	Team	Apps	(Points)
2010–2018	Northampton Saints	115	(165)
2018	Bedford Blues	6	(5)
2018−2021	Zebre	46	(35)
2021−	Bedford Blues		
- Correct as of 23 Apr 2021
International career
Years	Team	Apps	(Points)
2011-2012	England U20	5	(5)

James Harry Elliott (born 31 August 1992) is an English rugby union player who currently plays for RFU Championship side Bedford Blues. His preferred position is at wing, but he is also capable at centre.

Having made his Saints bow against Saracens in the LV= Cup, Elliott made a try-scoring Aviva Premiership debut on the wing against Sale Sharks in 2011.

He made it back-to-back scores a week later against London Irish and carried his scoring form into England U20's Six Nations winning campaign, crossing in the opening win against Wales.

Injury disrupted the remainder of Elliott's season but he returned by scoring a two tries as the Saints beat Saracens in his first appearance of the 2011/12 season and repeating the trick for the Saints' Heineken Cup visit to Castres in December.

Though battling with injuries throughout his career, Elliott found himself a regular on Saints' teamsheet and their scoresheet, after finishing the 2012/13 season as the Saint's leading try scorer after 5 tries in 2 games against Bath Rugby and Sale Sharks helped him achieve a total of 11 for the season.

Elliott also featured strongly in Saints' double winning season, racking up 28 appearances for the Midlands side that season, though he did not feature in the 23-man squads for either the Aviva Premiership and European Rugby Challenge Cup finals where Saints secured the titles. Elliott, however, did score a now iconic try against Leinster Rugby that season as Saints battled their way to the European Rugby Challenge Cup Final.

Most recently Elliott was battling to return from injury and finally did in November of the 2016/17 season against Newcastle Falcons in the opening round of the season's Anglo-Welsh Cup.

Elliott then started six other fixtures in the most recent season before falling to injury again, dislocating his shoulder as he made a try-saving tackle against Bristol Rugby at Franklin's Gardens in January and has not played since then.

On 26 July 2018, Elliott left Northampton to sign for RFU Championship side Bedford Blues ahead of the 2018–19 season. However, Elliott left Bedford immediately to sign for Italian club Zebre in the Pro14 from the 2018–19 to 2020–21 season. Elliott rejoined Bedford Blues ahead of the 2021-22 Championship Rugby season and was a shoo-in at outside centre, regularly featuring in the championship rugby podcasts Team of the Week at no. 13.
