= 2013–14 Premiership Rugby =

Rugby union competition in England

2013–14 Aviva Premiership
- Countries: England
- Date: 6 September 2013 – 31 May 2014
- Champions: Northampton Saints (1st title)
- Runners-up: Saracens
- Relegated: Worcester Warriors
- Matches played: 135
- Attendance: 1,721,729 (average 12,754 per match)
- Tries scored: 576 (average 4.3 per match)
- Top point scorer: George Ford (Bath) (250 points)
- Top try scorer: Vereniki Goneva (Leicester) (12 tries)

Official website
- www.premiershiprugby.com

The 2013–14 Aviva Premiership was the 27th season of the top flight English domestic rugby union competition and the fourth one to be sponsored by Aviva. The reigning champions entering the season were Leicester Tigers, who had claimed their tenth title after defeating Northampton Saints in the 2013 final. Newcastle Falcons had been promoted as champions from the 2012–13 RFU Championship at the first attempt.

This season was also the first season to be broadcast exclusively by BT Sport.

== Summary ==
Northampton Saints won their first title after defeating Saracens in the final at Twickenham after having finished second in the regular season table. Worcester Warriors were relegated after being unable to win their penultimate game of the season. It was the second time that Worcester have been relegated from the top flight since the leagues began and the first time since the 2009–10 Premiership Rugby season.

As usual, round 1 included the London Double Header at Twickenham, the tenth instance since its inception in 2004.

== Teams ==
Twelve teams compete in the league – the top eleven teams from the previous season and Newcastle Falcons who were promoted from the 2012–13 RFU Championship after a top flight absence of one year. They replaced London Welsh who were relegated after one year in the top flight.

=== Stadiums and locations ===
2013–14 Aviva Premiership teams

| Club | Director of Rugby/ Head Coach | Captain | Kit Supplier | Stadium | Capacity | City/Area |
|---|---|---|---|---|---|---|
| Bath | (England) Mike Ford | (England) Stuart Hooper | Tri Distribution | The Recreation Ground | 12,300 | Bath |
| Exeter Chiefs | (England) Rob Baxter | (Australia) Dean Mumm | Samurai | Sandy Park | 10,744 | Exeter |
| Gloucester | (Wales) Nigel Davies | (England) Tom Savage | KooGa | Kingsholm | 16,500 | Gloucester |
| Harlequins | (Ireland) Conor O'Shea | (England) Chris Robshaw | O'Neills | Twickenham Stoop (Note: Harlequins will also play a home game at Twickenham Stadium on 28 December 2013) | 14,816 | Twickenham, Greater London |
| Leicester Tigers | (England) Richard Cockerill | (England) Toby Flood | Canterbury | Welford Road | 24,000 | Leicester |
| London Irish | (Australia) Brian Smith | (England) Declan Danaher (England) George Skivington | ISC | Madejski Stadium (Note: London Irish will also play a home game at Twickenham Stadium on 7 September 2013) | 24,250 | Reading |
| London Wasps | (Wales) Dai Young | (England) Chris Bell | Kukri | Adams Park (Note: London Wasps will also play a home game at Twickenham Stadium on 7 September 2013 and 19 April 2014) | 10,516 | High Wycombe |
| Newcastle Falcons | (England) Dean Richards | (England) Will Welch | Orion | Kingston Park | 10,200 | Newcastle upon Tyne |
| Northampton Saints | (England) Jim Mallinder | (England) Dylan Hartley | BURRDA | Franklin's Gardens | 13,591 | Northampton |
| Sale Sharks | (Scotland) Bryan Redpath | (New Zealand) Daniel Braid | Samurai | AJ Bell Stadium | 12,000 | Salford, Greater Manchester |
| Saracens | (Ireland) Mark McCall | (England) Steve Borthwick | Nike | Allianz Park (Note: Saracens will also play a home game at Wembley Stadium on 22 March 2014) | 10,000 (Note: Allianz Park typically has a capacity of 10,000 but this can be raised to 15,000 with temporary seating) | Hendon, Greater London |
| Worcester Warriors | (England) Dean Ryan | (Wales) Jonathan Thomas | KooGa | Sixways Stadium | 12,068 | Worcester |

== Pre-season ==
The 2013 edition of the Premiership Rugby Sevens Series began on 1 August 2013 at Kingsholm, continued on 2 August at Franklin's Gardens and 3 August at Allianz Park. The finals was on 9 August 2013 at The Recreation Ground. This was the first opportunity of the season for any of the teams competing in the Premiership to win a trophy. Gloucester 7s won the Series Final, beating Leicester Tigers 7s 24 – 17 and with it qualification to the inaugural World Club 7s at Twickenham.

== Table ==
2013–14 Premiership Rugby Table
| Pos | Team | Pld | W | D | L | PF | PA | PD | TF | TA | TB | LB | Pts | Qualification or relegation |
|---|---|---|---|---|---|---|---|---|---|---|---|---|---|---|
| 1 | Saracens (RU) | 22 | 19 | 0 | 3 | 629 | 353 | +276 | 68 | 39 | 10 | 1 | 87 | Play-off place, Berth in the 2014–15 European Rugby Champions Cup |
| 2 | Northampton Saints (C) | 22 | 16 | 2 | 4 | 604 | 350 | +254 | 72 | 31 | 7 | 3 | 78 | Play-off place, Berth in the 2014–15 European Rugby Champions Cup |
| 3 | Leicester Tigers (SF) | 22 | 15 | 2 | 5 | 542 | 430 | +112 | 59 | 41 | 7 | 3 | 74 | Play-off place, Berth in the 2014–15 European Rugby Champions Cup |
| 4 | Harlequins (SF) | 22 | 15 | 0 | 7 | 437 | 365 | +72 | 43 | 33 | 4 | 3 | 67 | Play-off place, Berth in the 2014–15 European Rugby Champions Cup |
| 5 | Bath | 22 | 14 | 2 | 6 | 495 | 388 | +107 | 48 | 38 | 4 | 3 | 67 | Berth in the 2014–15 European Rugby Champions Cup |
| 6 | Sale Sharks | 22 | 12 | 0 | 10 | 432 | 399 | +33 | 46 | 40 | 3 | 6 | 57 | Berth in the 2014–15 European Rugby Champions Cup |
| 7 | London Wasps | 22 | 9 | 0 | 13 | 451 | 533 | −82 | 48 | 56 | 4 | 9 | 49 | Play-off for 2014–15 European Rugby Champions Cup |
| 8 | Exeter Chiefs | 22 | 9 | 0 | 13 | 426 | 480 | −54 | 40 | 51 | 2 | 7 | 45 | 2014–15 European Rugby Challenge Cup |
| 9 | Gloucester | 22 | 8 | 0 | 14 | 440 | 539 | −99 | 46 | 60 | 4 | 8 | 44 | 2014–15 European Rugby Challenge Cup |
| 10 | London Irish | 22 | 7 | 0 | 15 | 396 | 496 | −100 | 40 | 49 | 2 | 6 | 36 | 2014–15 European Rugby Challenge Cup |
| 11 | Newcastle Falcons | 22 | 3 | 0 | 19 | 281 | 544 | −263 | 23 | 62 | 2 | 8 | 22 | 2014–15 European Rugby Challenge Cup |
| 12 | Worcester Warriors (Note: The champion of the Championship (London Welsh) are eligible for promotion) (R) | 22 | 2 | 0 | 20 | 325 | 581 | −256 | 31 | 64 | 1 | 7 | 16 | Relegated |

Source: Premiership Rugby
Rules for classification: Tiebreakers for teams tied on points: 1) Number of matches won; 2) Difference between points for and against; 3) Total number of points for; 4) Aggregate number of points scored in matches between tied teams; 5) Number of matches won excluding the first match, then the second and so on until the tie is settled
(C) Champions; (RU) Runners-up; (SF) Losing semi-finalists; (R) Relegated

== Regular season ==
Premiership Rugby announced the fixture list on 4 July 2013. As with previous seasons, Round 1 included the London Double Header at Twickenham. Fixtures as per Premiership Rugby Match Centre.

=== Round 1 ===
6 September 2013
19:45

| Newcastle Falcons | 0 – 21 | Bath |
| | Report | Try: Perenise 63' m Penalty try 77' c Con: Ford (1/2); Pen: Ford (3) 6', 36', 57' |

Kingston Park
Attendance: 4,616
Referee: Wayne Barnes

7 September 2013
14:00

| London Irish | 20 – 42 | Saracens (BP) |
| Try: Low 37' c Yarde 69' c Con: Humphreys (2/2); Pen: Humphreys (2) 13', 62' | Report | Try: George (2) 9' c, 35' m Vunipola 63' c Ashton 81' m Con: Farrell (2/4); Pen: Farrell (6) 4', 27', 39', 41', 51', 72' |

Twickenham
Attendance: 62,637
Referee: Greg Garner

7 September 2013
15:00

| (BP) Gloucester | 16 – 22 | Sale Sharks |
| Try: Trinder 58' c Con: Burns (1/1); Pen: Burns (3) 18', 63', 66' | Report | Try: Cueto 11' m Forsyth 51' m Pen: Macleod (1) 7'; Arscott (2) 34', 37'; Drop: Ford (1/1) 68' |

Kingsholm
Attendance: 12,635
Referee: Andrew Small

7 September 2013
15:00

| (BP) Northampton Saints | 38 – 11 | Exeter Chiefs |
| Try: Hartley 2' c K. Pisi 19' c Wood 23' c G. Pisi 35' c Manoa 73' c Con: Myler (5/5); Pen: Myler (1) 14' | Report | Try: Mumm 59' m Pen: Steenson (2) 11', 31' |

Franklin's Gardens
Attendance: 12,205
Referee: JP Doyle

7 September 2013
16:30

| (BP) London Wasps | 15 – 16 | Harlequins |
| Try: Launchbury 1' c Palmer 80' m Con: Goode (1/2); Pen: Goode (1/1) 13' | Report | Try: Dickson 70' c Con: Evans (1/1); Pen: Evans (3) 12', 45', 49' |

Twickenham
Attendance: 62,637
Referee: Tim Wigglesworth

8 September 2013
14:00

| (BP) Leicester Tigers | 32 – 15 | Worcester Warriors |
| Try: Thompstone 13' m Mélé 40' c Crane 47' c Goneva 79' c Con: Lamb (3/4); Pen: Lamb (2) 6', 23' | Report | Try: Jones 56' c Matavesi 65' m Con: Mieres (1/2); Pen: Mieres (1) 34' |

Welford Road
Attendance: 20,230
Referee: Luke Pearce

=== Round 2 ===
13 September 2013
19:45

| (BP) Harlequins | 6 – 13 | Northampton Saints |
| Pen: Evans (2) 29', 44' | Report | Try: Wilson 62' c Con: Myler (1/1); Pen: Myler (2) 10', 52' |

The Stoop
Attendance: 11,498
Referee: Andrew Small

13 September 2013
20:00

| (BP) Sale Sharks | 14 – 15 | Newcastle Falcons |
| Try: Braid 27' m Pen: Macleod (3) 6', 24', 58' | Report | Pen: Godman (4) 18', 36', 39', 48'; Clegg (1) 67' |

Salford City Stadium
Attendance: 6,876
Referee: Luke Pearce

14 September 2013
15:00

| Exeter Chiefs | 30 – 26 | London Wasps (BP) |
| Try: James (2) 14' c, 59' c Scaysbrook 49' c Con: Steenson (3/3); Pen: Steenson (3) 11', 30', 34' | Report | Try: Wade 68' c Johnson 77' c Con: Goode (2/2); Pen: Goode (4) 2', 8', 28', 40' |

Sandy Park
Attendance: 7,033
Referee: Martin Fox

14 September 2013
15:00

| (BP) Worcester Warriors | 18 – 20 | London Irish |
| Try: Lemi 16' c Mieres 69' m Con: Mieres (1/2); Pen: Mieres (2) 4', 59' | Report | Try: Yarde (2) 36' c, 46' c Con: Humphreys (2/2); Pen: Humphreys (2) 13', 76' |

Sixways
Attendance: 6,990
Referee: Tim Wigglesworth

14 September 2013
15:15

| Bath | 27 – 20 | Leicester Tigers (BP) |
| Try: Joseph 18' c Banahan 39' m Con: Ford (1/2); Pen: Ford (5) 13', 29', 34', 64', 79' | Report | Try: Mafi 46' m Slater 59' c Goneva 67' m Con: Mélé (1/3); Pen: Mélé (1) 11' |

The Recreation Ground
Attendance: 11,253
Referee: Greg Garner

15 September 2013
14:00

| (BP) Saracens | 44 – 12 | Gloucester |
| Try: Tomkins 20' c Strettle (2) 48' c, 80' c Brits 57' c B Vunipola 76' c Con: Farrell (4/4); Spencer (1/1); Pen: Farrell (3) 31', 42', 53' | Report | Pen: Burns (4) 11', 27', 37', 39' |

Allianz Park
Attendance: 7,462
Referee: Wayne Barnes

=== Round 3 ===
20 September 2013
19:45

| Worcester Warriors | 13 – 37 | Harlequins (BP) |
| Try: Penalty try 67' c Con: Mieres (1/1); Pen: Mieres (2/2) 2', 26' | Report | Try: Care 30' c Marler 36' c Buchanan 42' c Brown 48' c Con: Evans (4/4); Pen: Evans (2/2) 13' 17'; Botica (1/1) 78' |

Sixways
Attendance: 7,269
Referee: Wayne Barnes

20 September 2013
20:00

| Sale Sharks | 26 – 22 | London Wasps (BP) |
| Try: Cueto 31' c Cipriani 46' c Con: Cipriani (2/2); Pen: Cipriani (4/5) 24', 38, 60, 79' | Report | Try: Johnson 54' c Penalty try 66' c Bassett 70' m Con: Goode (2/3); Pen: Goode (1/1) 26' |

Salford City Stadium
Attendance: 5,372
Referee: Tim Wigglesworth

21 September 2013
15:00

| (BP) Leicester Tigers | 31 – 6 | Newcastle Falcons |
| Try: Crane 6' m Kitchener 12' c Scully 33' m Bowden 52' c Waldrom 68' c Con: Flood (2/4); Williams (1/1) | Report | Pen: Clegg (1/1) 26'; Drop: Clegg (1/1) 31' |

Welford Road
Attendance: 19,723
Referee: David Rose

21 September 2013
15:00

| (BP) London Irish | 23 – 29 | Exeter Chiefs |
| Try: Rouse 29' c Yarde 51' c Con: Humphreys (2/2); Pen: Humphreys (3/5) 18', 51', 55' | Report | Try: Mumm 66' c White 72' c Con: Steenson (2/2); Pen: Steenson (5/6) 5', 21', 24', 47', 60' |

Madejski Stadium
Attendance: 6,004
Referee: Andrew Small

21 September 2013
15:15

| Gloucester | 26 – 24 | Northampton Saints (BP) |
| Try: Sharples 37' m Twelvetrees 42' c Stooke 65' m Con: Burns (1/3); Pen: Burns (2/4) 13', 54'; Twelvetrees (1/1) 80' | Report | Try: Foden 5' c Manoa 44' c Elliott 78' c Con: Myler (3/3); Pen: Myler (1) 36' |

Kingsholm
Attendance: 12,688
Referee: Martin Fox

22 September 2013
14:00

| Saracens | 31 – 17 | Bath |
| Try: Strettle (2) 9' c, 40' c Goode 17' c Stevens 33' c Con: Farrell (4/4); Pen: Farrell (1/1) 3' | Report | Try: Rokoduguni 57' c Attwood 75' c Con: Ford (2/2); Pen: Heathcote (1/2) 7' |

Allianz Park
Attendance: 8,047
Referee: JP Doyle

=== Round 4 ===
27 September 2013
19:45

| Northampton Saints (BP) | 33 – 14 | Sale Sharks |
| Try: Burrell 13' c North 22' m G. Pisi 31' c Dickson 53' c Dowson 60' c Con: Myler (4/5) | Report | Try: Cueto 40' c Jones 77' c Con: Cipriani (1/1); Ford (1/1) |

Franklin's Gardens
Attendance: 12,782
Referee: David Rose

28 September 2013
15:00

| Bath (BP) | 33 – 18 | London Irish |
| Try: Joseph 4' c Mercer (2) 17' c, 37' c Ford 26' c Webber 29' m Con: Ford (4/5) | Report | Try: Geraghty (2) 34' c, 67' m Con: Geraghty (1/2); Pen: Geraghty (2/3) 8', 41' |

The Recreation Ground
Attendance: 11,917
Referee: Luke Pearce

28 September 2013
15:00

| London Wasps (BP) | 32 – 16 | Worcester Warriors |
| Try: Mullan 29' m Wade 43' m Wooley 47' m Thompson 68' m Pen: Goode (3/4) 2', 11', 58'; Carlisle (1/1) 72' | Report | Try: Drauniniu 65' c Con: Gray (1/1); Pen: Mieres (3/4) 5', 9', 16' |

Adams Park
Attendance: 5,275
Referee: Gregory Garner

28 September 2013
15:15

| Harlequins | 12 – 22 | Saracens |
| Pen: Evans (4/5) 3', 12', 27', 38' | Report | Try: Ashton 50' c Con: Farrell (1/1); Pen: Farrell (5/6) 16', 36', 56', 62', 66' |

The Stoop
Attendance: 12,956
Referee: Martin Fox

29 September 2013
14:00

| Exeter Chiefs | 9 – 21 | Leicester Tigers |
| Pen: Steenson (3/4) 43', 50', 57' | Report | Try: Youngs 10' m Goneva 38' c Con: Flood (1/2); Pen: Flood (3/4) 14', 61', 73' |

Sandy Park
Attendance: 9,524
Referee: Tim Wigglesworth

29 September 2013
15:00

| Newcastle Falcons (BP) | 16 – 22 | Gloucester |
| Try: Catterick 1' c Con: Clegg (1/1); Pen: Clegg (2/2) 17', 24'; Godman (1/1) 58' | Report | Try: Cook 30' m May 52' m Pen: Burns (4/5) 19', 47', 65', 76' |

Kingston Park
Attendance: 5,040
Referee: Andrew Small

=== Round 5 ===
4 October 2013
19:45

| Sale Sharks | 19 – 13 | Bath (BP) |
| Try: Forsyth 30' c Con: Cipriani (1/1); Pen: Cipriani (3/5) 23', 36', 48'; Drop: Cipriani (1/1) 10' | Report | Try: Rokoduguni 11' c Con: G. Ford (1/1); Pen: G. Ford (2/5) 34', 56' |

Salford City Stadium
Attendance: 5,719
Referee: Andrew Small

5 October 2013
15:00

| London Irish | 18 – 13 | Harlequins (BP) |
| Try: Cowan 59' c Lewington 62' m Con: Geraghty (1/2); Pen: Geraghty (2/2) 6', 30' | Report | Try: Care 69' c Con: Evans (1/1); Pen: Evans (2/4) 17', 35' |

Madejski Stadium
Attendance: 8,832
Referee: David Rose

5 October 2013
15:00

| Saracens | 19 – 12 | London Wasps (BP) |
| Try: Fraser 45' c Con: Farrell (1/1); Pen: Alex Goode (1/2) 5'; Farrell (3/4) 68', 75', 77' | Report | Try: Bell (2) 64' m, 80' c Con: Andy Goode (1/2) |

Allianz Park
Attendance: 9,642
Referee: Luke Pearce

5 October 2013
15:00

| (BP) Worcester Warriors | 11 – 16 | Newcastle Falcons |
| Try: Lemi 68' m Pen: Mieres (2/3) 32', 48' | Report | Try: Blair 7' c Con: Clegg (1/1); Pen: Clegg (2/2) 2', 22'; Godman (1/1) 72' |

Sixways
Attendance: 6,415
Referee: Martin Fox

5 October 2013
15:15

| Leicester Tigers | 19 – 19 | Northampton Saints |
| Try: Slater 75' c Con: Flood (1/1); Pen: Flood (4/6) 15', 28', 50', 70' | Report | Try: Corbisiero 46' c Con: Myler (1/1); Pen: Myler (4/4) 7', 18', 26', 66' |

Welford Road
Attendance: 23,891
Referee: JP Doyle

6 October 2013
14:00

| Gloucester | 12 – 29 | Exeter Chiefs |
| Try: M. Thomas 19' m May 66' c Con: Burns (1/2) | Report | Try: White 32' c Mumm 63' c Con: Steenson (2/2); Pen: Steenson (5/8) 18', 29', 43', 75', 78' |

Kingsholm
Attendance: 14,582
Referee: Matthew Carley

=== Round 6 ===
25 October 2013
19:45

| Bath | 15 – 13 | Gloucester (BP) |
| Pen: Ford (5/9) 5', 27', 31', 45', 65' | Report | Try: Burns 60' c Con: Burns (1/1); Pen: Burns (2/3) 33', 66' |

The Recreation Ground
Attendance: 12,200
Referee: Wayne Barnes

26 October 2013
15:00

| (BP) Exeter Chiefs | 40 – 6 | Worcester Warriors |
| Try: White (2) 5' c, 50' c Mumm 9' c Dollman 57' c Welch 69' m Thomas 72' c Con: Steenson (4/4); Slade (1/2) | Report | Pen: Mieres (2/3) 8', 34' |

Sandy Park
Attendance: 7,074
Referee: JP Doyle

26 October 2013
15:00

| Harlequins | 24 – 3 | Sale Sharks |
| Try: Wallace 47' m Clifford 68' c Con: Botica (1/2); Pen: Botica (4/4) 16', 27', 36', 53' | Report | Pen: Cipriani (1/1) 24' |

The Stoop
Attendance: 11,885
Referee: Luke Pearce

26 October 2013
15:15

| (BP) Northampton Saints | 41 – 20 | Saracens |
| Try: Elliott 11' c Manoa 25' c Foden (2) 42' m, 51' c Burrell 63' c K. Pisi 71' m Con: Myler (4/6); Pen: Myler (1/1) 5' | Report | Try: Taylor 60' c Brown 67' c Con: Goode (2/2); Pen: Goode (2/3) 8', 40+1' |

Franklin's Gardens
Attendance: 13,474
Referee: Tim Wigglesworth

27 October 2013
14:00

| London Wasps | 22 – 12 | Leicester Tigers |
| Try: Wade 8' c Con: Goode (1/1); Pen: Goode (3/4) 29', 36', 76'; Drop: Goode (2/3) 52', 54' | Report | Pen: Williams (4/6) 12', 32', 39', 68' |

Adams Park
Attendance: 7,040
Referee: Andrew Small

27 October 2013
15:00

| Newcastle Falcons | 13 – 11 | London Irish (BP) |
| Try: Powell 64' c Con: Godman (1/1); Pen: Clegg (2/4) 16', 30' | Report | Try: Treviranus 10' m Pen: Humphreys (2/5) 40', 55' |

Kingston Park
Attendance: 4,766
Referee: Gregory Garner

=== Round 7 ===
1 November 2013
19:45

| Worcester Warriors | 6 – 21 | Bath |
| Pen: Warwick (2/4) 37', 41' | Report | Try: Perenise 28' c Agulla 59' m Con: Ford (1/2); Pen: Ford (3/4) 3', 6', 15' |

Sixways
Attendance: 9,344
Referee: Gregory Garner

1 November 2013
20:00

| (BP) Sale Sharks | 16 – 18 | Exeter Chiefs |
| Try: Cueto 78' c Con: Cipriani (1/1); Pen: Cipriani (3/5) 8', 15', 74' | Report | Pen: Steenson (6/6) 5', 19', 22', 33', 37', 76' |

Salford City Stadium
Attendance: 6,153
Referee: Wayne Barnes

2 November 2013
17:00

| (2BP) Gloucester | 30 – 32 | London Wasps (BP) |
| Try: Knight 31' c Kalamafoni 43' m Cook (2) 71' m, 80' c Con: Burns (2/4); Pen: Burns (2/3) 29', 58' | Report | Try: Wade (2) 15' c, 76' m Hughes 20' c Thompson 73' c Con: Goode (3/4); Pen: Goode (2/2) 40', 61' |

Kingsholm
Attendance: 13,441
Referee: JP Doyle

2 November 2013
17:30

| (BP) Leicester Tigers | 16 – 23 | Harlequins |
| Try: Penalty try 79' c Con: Williams (1/1); Pen: Williams (3/4) 8', 18', 46' | Report | Try: Easter 40' c Hopper 43' c Con: Evans (2/2); Pen: Evans (3/3) 36', 63', 72' |

Welford Road
Attendance: 24,000
Referee: Tim Wigglesworth

3 November 2013
14:00

| (BP) London Irish | 14 – 19 | Northampton Saints |
| Try: Tagicakibau 38' m Pen: Humphreys (3/4) 9', 26', 61' | Report | Try: Wilson 23' c Con: Myler (1/1); Pen: Myler (4/6) 5', 12', 34', 67' |

Madejski Stadium
Attendance: 7,247
Referee: Andrew Small

3 November 2013
15:00

| (BP) Saracens | 40 – 3 | Newcastle Falcons |
| Try: Hodgson 27' c Strettle (2) 56' m, 76' c George 62' m Goode 68' c Con: Hodgson (2/4); Goode (1/1); Pen: Hodgson (3/4) 35', 42', 53' | Report | Pen: Godman (1/3) 13' |

Allianz Park
Attendance: 8,152
Referee: Matthew Carley

=== Round 8 ===
22 November 2013
20:00

| (BP) Sale Sharks | 26 – 10 | Worcester Warriors |
| Try: Cueto 19' c Gaskell 46' c Braid 56' c Arscott 75' m Con: Cipriani (3/3) | Report | Try: Faingaʻanuku 66' c Con: Pennell (1/1); Pen: Mieres (1/2) 15' |

Salford City Stadium
Attendance: 5,755
Referee: Andrew Small

23 November 2013
15:00

| (BP) Exeter Chiefs | 9 – 16 | Saracens |
| Pen: Dollman (1/1) 31'; Steenson (2/4) 43', 69' | Report | Try: Ransom 4' c Con: Goode (1/1); Pen: Goode (2/2) 28', 35'; Bosch (1/2) 50' |

Sandy Park
Attendance: 9,384
Referee: Tim Wigglesworth

23 November 2013
15:00

| Harlequins | 27 – 19 | Gloucester |
| Try: Easter 30' c Care 36' c Wallace 43' c Con: Evans (3/3); Pen: Evans (2/2) 1', 15' | Report | Try: Twelvetrees (2) 9' m, 74' c May 50' c Con: Burns (2/3) |

The Stoop
Attendance: 14,056
Referee: Matthew Carley

23 November 2013
15:00

| Leicester Tigers | 20 – 11 | London Irish |
| Try: Penalty try (2) 9' c, 63' c Con: Flood (2/2); Pen: Flood (2/3) 33', 47' | Report | Try: Mulchrone 78' m Pen: O'Connor (2/3) 21', 30' |

Welford Road
Attendance: 23,284
Referee: Martin Fox

23 November 2013
15:15

| Northampton Saints | 18 – 0 | Newcastle Falcons |
| Try: Wilson 57' m Burrell 63' c Con: Myler (1/2); Pen: Myler (2/2) 29', 34' | Report |

Franklin's Gardens
Attendance: 12,415
Referee: Dean Richards

24 November 2013
14:00

| London Wasps | 5 – 28 | Bath |
| Try: Holmes 68' m | Report | Try: Rokoduguni (2) 37' m, 59' c Garvey 76' c Con: Ford (1/2); Heathcote (1/1); Pen: Ford (2/4) 3', 57'; Drop: Ford (1/3) 26' |

Adams Park
Attendance: 5,316
Referee: Luke Pearce

=== Round 9 ===
29 November 2013
19:45

| (BP) Gloucester | 17 – 22 | Leicester Tigers |
| Try: Burns 8' c May 40' c Con: Burns (1); Cook (1); Pen: Twelvetrees 51' | Report | Try: Bowden 31' c Con: Flood (1); Pen: Flood (5/8) 13', 23', 64', 70', 75' |

Kingsholm
Attendance: 14,803
Referee: Greg Garner

30 November 2013
15:00

| (BP) London Irish | 12 – 19 | London Wasps |
| Pen: O'Connor (3/3) 2', 18', 64'; Geraghty (1/2) 36' | Report | Try: penalty try 34' c Con: Goode (1); Pen: Goode (3/4) 6', 13', 42'; Drop: Goode (1/1) 77' |

Madejski Stadium
Attendance: 7,568
Referee: Dean Richards

30 November 2013
15:00

| Saracens | 24 – 19 | Sale Sharks (BP) |
| Try: Wilson 44' m Kruis 72' c Con: Hodgson (1/2); Pen: Hodgson (4/6) 1', 35', 58', 79' | Report | Try: Cipriani 11' c Con: Cipriani (1); Pen: Miller (2/2) 37'; Cipriani (1/1) 47'; Macleod (1/1) 80+1'; Drop: Cipriani (1/1) 40' |

Allianz Park
Attendance: 7,126
Referee: JP Doyle

30 November 2013
15:00

| Worcester Warriors | 10 – 33 | Northampton Saints |
| Try: Mieres 37' c Con: Mieres (1); Pen: Pennell (1/1) 50' | Report | Try: Manoa 61' c Collins 71' c Wood 73' c Con: Myler (3/3); Pen: Myler (4/4) 11', 17', 46', 65' |

Sixways
Attendance: 7,808
Referee: Tim Wigglesworth

30 November 2013
15:15

| Bath | 21 – 16 | Exeter Chiefs (BP) |
| Pen: Ford (6/6) 10', 28', 40', 52', 62', 76'; Drop: Ford (1/1) 67' | Report | Try: Welch 21' m Mumm 55' m Pen: Steenson (2/3) 5', 70' |

The Recreation Ground
Attendance: 12,200
Referee: Matthew Carley

1 December 2013
15:00

| Newcastle Falcons | 9 – 35 | Harlequins (BP) |
| Pen: Godman (3/4) 18', 32', 44' | Report | Try: Williams 9' c Smith (2) 41' m, 67' c Care 56' c Con: Evans (3/4); Pen: Evans (3/3) 21', 26', 46' |

Kingston Park
Attendance: 6,017
Referee: Andrew Small

=== Round 10 ===
20 December 2013
20:00

| Sale Sharks | 15 – 3 | London Irish |
| Try: Brady 18' c Seymour 27' m Con: Cipriani (1/2); Pen: Cipriani (1/4) 47' | Report | Pen: Humphreys (1/1) 67' |

Salford City Stadium
Attendance: 6,823
Referee: Tim Wigglesworth

21 December 2013
15:00

| Bath | 14 – 3 | Harlequins |
| Try: Joseph 45' m Pen: Ford (3/7) 1', 5', 24' | Report | Try: Evans (1/1) 28' |

The Recreation Ground
Attendance: 12,000
Referee: Martin Fox

21 December 2013
15:00

| Exeter Chiefs | 16 – 3 | Newcastle Falcons |
| Try: Thomas 50' c Con: Steenson (1/1) 51'; Pen: Steenson (3/4) 10', 14', 28' | Report | Pen: Godman (1/1) 40+2' |

Sandy Park
Attendance: 8,955
Referee: Greg Garner

21 December 2013
15:00

| (BP) London Wasps | 15 – 17 | Northampton Saints |
| Pen: Daly (1/4) 4'; Goode (2/2) 23', 31'; Carlisle (2/2) 65', 77' | Report | Try: Day 11' m Pen: Myler (4/4) 21', 37', 58', 80' |

Adams Park
Attendance: 6,897
Referee: Matthew Carley

21 December 2013
15:00

| (BP) Saracens | 49 – 10 | Leicester Tigers |
| Try: Wilson 5' c Ashton (2) 40' m, 76' c B. Vunipola 44' c Wray 67' c penalty try 71' c Con: Farrell (2/3) 6', 44'; Hodgson (3/3) 68', 72', 77'; Pen: Farrell (3/3) 10', 31', 49' | Report | Try: Kitchener 36' c Con: Lamb (1/1) 37'; Pen: Lamb (1/2) 23' |

Allianz Park
Attendance: 9,999
Referee: Wayne Barnes

22 December 2013
15:00

| Gloucester | 12 – 6 | Worcester Warriors (BP) |
| Pen: Twelvetrees (4/6) 2', 35', 60', 65' | Report | Pen: Mieres (2/3) 5', 52' |

Kingsholm
Attendance: 15,629
Referee: JP Doyle

=== Round 11 ===
27 December 2013
19:45

| (BP) Newcastle Falcons | 12 – 17 | London Wasps |
| Try: Cato 59' m Welch 80+2' c Con: Godman (1/2) 80+3' | Report | Try: Jones 12' c Johnson 53' c Con: Goode (2/2) 12', 54'; Pen: Goode (1/2) 35' |

Kingston Park
Attendance: 6,146
Referee: Wayne Barnes

28 December 2013
15:00

| Leicester Tigers | 30 – 23 | Sale Sharks (BP) |
| Try: Slater 2' c Thompstone 22' c penalty try 73' c Con: Williams (3/3) 3', 23', 74'; Pen: Williams (3/3) 10', 35', 44' | Report | Try: Cueto 48' c Ingall 59' c Con: Macleod (2/2) 49', 60'; Pen: Macleod (2/3) 25', 40+2'; Ford (1/1) 76' |

Welford Road
Attendance: 24,000
Referee: Matthew Carley

28 December 2013
15:00

| (BP) Northampton Saints | 43 – 25 | Bath |
| Try: Day (2) 20' c, 42' c G. Pisi 28' c Elliott 33' c Manoa 57' m North 80' c Con: Myler (5/6) 20', 30', 34', 43', 80+1'; Pen: Myler (1/1) 75' | Report | Try: Eastmond 5' c Webber 52' m Houston 66' c Con: Ford (2/3) 6', 67'; Pen: Ford (2/2) 3', 15' |

Franklin's Gardens
Attendance: 13,475
Referee: Luke Pearce

28 December 2013
15:00

| Worcester Warriors | 8 – 26 | Saracens (BP) |
| Try: Senatore 36' m Pen: Mieres (1/2) 7' | Report | Try: Strettle 8' m Brits 16' c Goode 24' c Hodgson 28' c Con: Hodgson (3/4) 17', 26', 29' |

Sixways
Attendance: 9,301
Referee: Gregory Garner

28 December 2013
15:00

| Harlequins | 22 – 6 | Exeter Chiefs |
| Try: Evans 2' c Walker 31' m Brown 39' c Con: Evans (2/3) 3', 40'; Pen: Evans (1/3) 62' | Report | Pen: Steenson (2/2) 7', 43' |

Twickenham
Attendance: 74,827
Referee: JP Doyle

29 December 2013
15:00

| (BP) London Irish | 19 – 22 | Gloucester |
| Try: Mulchrone 1' c Sheridan (2) 56' m, 70' c Con: Humphreys (1/1) 2'; Geraghty (1/3) 70' | Report | Try: May 25' c Con: Twelvetrees (1/1) 26'; Pen: Twelvetrees (4/4) 7', 19', 40+1', 53'; Burns (1/1) 60' |

Madejski Stadium
Attendance: 11,174
Referee: Andrew Small

=== Round 12 ===
3 January 2014
19:45

| Newcastle Falcons | 8 – 16 | Sale Sharks |
| Try: Saull 29' m Pen: Godman (1/3) 2' | Report | Try: Brady (1/1) 22' c Con: Cipriani (1/1); Pen: Cipriani (2/4) 5', 40'; Macleod 72' |

Kingston Park
Attendance: 4,143
Referee: Andrew Small

3 January 2014
19:45

| Northampton Saints | 23 – 9 | Harlequins |
| Try: North 44' c Hartley 71' c Con: Myler (2/2); Pen: Myler (3/4) 3', 37', 66' | Report | Pen: Evans (2/2) 6', 19'; Botica (1/1) 61' |

Franklin's Gardens
Attendance: 13,475
Referee: Greg Garner

4 January 2014
15:00

| London Irish | 22 – 9 | Worcester Warriors |
| Try: O'Connor 60' c Con: O'Connor (1/1) 61'; Pen: O'Connor (5/7) 11', 38', 45', 49', 55' | Report | Pen: Pennell (3/4) 17', 32', 66' |

Madejski Stadium
Attendance: 5,714
Referee: Wayne Barnes

4 January 2014
15:15

| Gloucester | 8 – 29 | Saracens |
| Try: Cox 69' m Pen: Twelvetrees (1/1) 38' | Report | Try: De Kock 8' m Strettle 21' m Goode 47' c Con: Farrell (1/3) 48'; Pen: Farrell (4/4) 3', 16', 29', 60' |

Kingsholm
Attendance: 13,800
Referee: Luke Pearce

5 January 2014
14:00

| Leicester Tigers | 27 – 27 | Bath |
| Try: Benjamin 8' m Waldrom 64' m Gibson 78' m Pen: Williams (4/5) 12', 21', 36', 44' | Report | Try: Watson 14' c Louw 17' c Joseph 49' c Con: Ford (3/3) 15', 19', 49'; Pen: Ford (2/2) 25', 40+1' |

Welford Road
Attendance: 22,479
Referee: JP Doyle

5 January 2014
15:00

| London Wasps | 19 – 16 | Exeter Chiefs (BP) |
| Try: Simpson 61' c Con: Goode (1/1) 62'; Pen: Daly (1/2) 9'; Goode (1/3) 45', 48'; Drop: Goode (1/3) 80' | Report | Try: Lewis 1' c Con: Slade (1/1); Pen: Slade (3/4) 11', 30', 72' |

Adams Park
Attendance: 5,356
Referee: Andrew Small

=== Round 13 ===
7 February 2014
19:45

| (BP) Worcester Warriors | 22 – 23 | Leicester Tigers |
| Try: Drauniniu 48' c Con: Pennell (1/1); Pen: Pennell (5/6) 14', 17', 21', 27', 68' | Report | Try: Goneva (2) 3' c, 23' c Con: Flood (2/2); Pen: Flood (3/4) 33', 52', 70' |

Sixways
Attendance: 7,516
Referee: Andrew Small

7 February 2014
20:00

| (BP) Sale Sharks | 24 – 19 | Gloucester (BP) |
| Try: Miller (2) 9' m, 14' m Braid (2) 37' c, 43' c Con: Cipriani (2/4) | Report | Try: M Thomas 1' m Sharples 28' m Pen: Burns (3/5) 45', 60', 76' |

Salford City Stadium
Attendance: 6,059
Referee: Matthew Carley

8 February 2014
15:00

| Bath | 24 – 6 | Newcastle Falcons |
| Try: Agulla 47' c Houston 52' c Louw 79' c Con: Ford (3/3); Pen: Ford (1/4) 17' | Report | Pen: Godman (2/2) 32', 42' |

The Recreation Ground
Attendance: 11,132
Referee: Tim Wigglesworth

8 February 2014
15:00

| Saracens | 13 – 22 | London Irish |
| Try: Bosch 13' m Brits 75' m Pen: Hodgson (1/2) 34' | Report | Try: Parr 20' c Lewington 36' m Skivington 38' c Con: O'Connor (2/3); Pen: O'Connor (1/2) 1' |

Allianz Park
Attendance: 9,012
Referee: Dean Richards

8 February 2014
19:00

| (1 BP) Exeter Chiefs | 16 – 17 | Northampton Saints |
| Try: Lewis 52' c Con: Steenson (1/1); Pen: Steenson (3/5) 9', 32', 39' | Report | Try: Wilson 17' m Manoa 33' m Pisi 77' c Con: Myler (1/3) |

Sandy Park
Attendance: 8,336
Referee: Greg Garner

9 February 2014
13:00

| Harlequins | 11 – 10 | London Wasps (1 BP) |
| Try: Smith 77' m Pen: Evans (1/1) 5'; Botica (1/2) 50' | Report | Try: penalty try 27' c Con: Carlisle (1/1); Pen: Carlisle (1/2) 3' |

The Stoop
Attendance: 13,175
Referee: Luke Pearce

=== Round 14 ===
14 February 2014
20:00

| (BP) Sale Sharks | 10 – 15 | Saracens |
| Try: Jones 36' c Con: Cipriani (1/1); Pen: Cipriani (1/2) 15' | Report | Pen: Hodgson (5/6) 4', 49', 54', 59', 79' |

Salford City Stadium
Attendance: 5,737
Referee: Greg Garner

15 February 2014
15:00

| Harlequins | 18 – 14 | Newcastle Falcons (BP) |
| Try: Lindsay-Hague 11' m Smith 26' c Con: Botica (1/2); Pen: Botica (2/3) 75', 80' | Report | Try: Tait 69' m Pen: Clegg (3/5) 29', 44', 47' |

The Stoop
Attendance: 12,293
Referee: JP Doyle

15 February 2014
15:00

| (BP) London Wasps | 20 – 23 | London Irish |
| Try: Short 23' m Pen: Carlisle (5/5) 10', 44', 51', 65', 68' | Report | Try: Humphreys 3' c Paice 21' c Con: O'Connor (2/2); Pen: O'Connor (2/3) 7', 62'; Drop: Geraghty (1/1) 73' |

Adams Park
Attendance: 4,925
Referee: Tim Wigglesworth

15 February 2014
15:00

| Northampton Saints | 30 – 14 | Worcester Warriors |
| Try: Penalty try 43' c van Velze (2) 54' c, 67' c Con: Myler (3/3); Pen: Myler (3/3) 12', 9', 24' | Report | Try: Lemi 45' m Pen: Pennell (3/4) 5', 42', 59' |

Franklin's Gardens
Attendance: 12,553
Referee: Wayne Barnes

15 February 2014
15:15

| (BP) Exeter Chiefs | 23 – 27 | Bath |
| Try: White 39' c Whitten 66' c Con: Steenson (2/2); Pen: Steenson (3/3) 10', 32', 44' | Report | Try: Devoto 26' c Eastmond 53' c Abendanon 62' c Con: Ford (3/3); Pen: Ford (2/2) 12', 80' |

Sandy Park
Attendance: 10,745
Referee: Andrew Small

16 February 2014
14:00

| Leicester Tigers | 11 – 8 | Gloucester (BP) |
| Try: Tait 67' m Pen: Flood (2/3) 31', 77' | Report | Try: Sharples 50' m Pen: Cook (1/2) 37' |

Welford Road
Attendance: 22,195
Referee: Dean Richards

=== Round 15 ===
22 February 2014
14:00

| Bath (BP) | 32 – 25 | London Wasps (BP) |
| Try: Watson (2) 11' m, 27' c Abendanon 34' c Eastmond 53' c Con: Heathcote (3/4); Pen: Heathcote (2/4) 1', 26' | Report | Try: Hughes 33' c Helu 48' c Daly 60' m Con: Carlisle (2/3); Pen: Carlisle (2/4) 15', 22' |

The Recreation Ground
Attendance: 12,200
Referee: Matthew Carley

22 February 2014
14:00

| Gloucester | 25 – 20 | Harlequins (BP) |
| Try: Kalamafoni 13' c Kvesic 48' m Murphy 56' c Con: Cook (2/3); Pen: Cook (2/2) 44', 61' | Report | Try: Lindsay-Hague 29' c Ward 74' c Con: Botica (2/2); Pen: Botica (2/2) 1', 12' |

Kingsholm
Attendance: 12,531
Referee: Gregory Garner

22 February 2014
14:00

| Worcester Warriors | 12 – 24 | Sale Sharks |
| Try: Galarza (2) 61' m, 73' c Con: Ryan Lamb (1/1) | Report | Try: Cueto 5' m Braid 52' c Con: Cipriani (1/2); Pen: Cipriani (3/3) 1', 11', 44'; MacLeod (1/1) 64' |

Sixways
Attendance: 6,214
Referee: Tim Wigglesworth

23 February 2014
13:00

| (1 BP) London Irish | 15 – 20 | Leicester Tigers |
| Pen: O'Connor (4/7) 1', 16', 25', 61'; Humphreys (1/1) 70' | Report | Try: Youngs 8' m Mulipola 34' m Goneva 46' c Con: Williams (1/3) 48'; Pen: Williams (1/1) 54' |

Madejski Stadium
Attendance: 9,114
Referee: JP Doyle

23 February 2014
15:00

| (1 BP) Newcastle Falcons | 16 – 22 | Northampton Saints |
| Try: Cato 76' c Con: Hodgson (1/1) 77'; Pen: Clegg (3/4) 9', 18', 57' | Report | Try: Wilson (2) 6' m, 31' c Stephenson 15' c Con: Myler (2/3) 16', 33'; Pen: Myler (1/1) 61' |

Kingston Park
Attendance: 4,846
Referee: Andrew Small

23 February 2014
15:15

| Saracens | 23 – 10 | Exeter Chiefs |
| Try: Johnston 33' c Brits 48' c Con: Hodgson (2/3) 34', 49'; Pen: Hodgson (3/4) 54', 57', 76' | Report | Try: Whitten 9' c Con: Steenson (1/1) 10'; Pen: Steenson (1/1) 45' |

Allianz Park
Attendance: 8,114
Referee: Wayne Barnes

=== Round 16 ===
28 February 2014
20:00

| Bath | 10 – 23 | Saracens |
| Try: penalty try 71' c Con: Ford (1/1) 71'; Pen: Ford (1/2) 18' | Report | Try: Wyles 30' c Strettle 39' c Con: Goode (2/2) 32', 40'; Pen: Goode (2/2) 21', 74'; Drop: Goode (1/1) 54' |

The Recreation Ground
Attendance: 12,100
Referee: Luke Pearce

1 March 2014
15:00

| Exeter Chiefs | 18 – 0 | London Irish |
| Try: Dollman 41' c Whitten 66' m Con: Slade (1/2) 43'; Pen: Slade (2/2) 11', 20' | Report |

Sandy Park
Attendance: 7,952
Referee: Matthew Carley

1 March 2014
15:00

| Harlequins | 21 – 20 | Worcester Warriors (BP) |
| Try: Smith 55' m Sloan 68' c Con: Botica (1/2) 69'; Pen: Botica (3/3) 39', 42', 63' | Report | Try: Lemi 30' c Pennell 74' c Con: Lamb (1/1) 31'; Pennell (1/1) 74'; Pen: Pennell (1/2) 5'; Lamb (1/3) 23' |

The Stoop
Attendance: 12,173
Referee: Wayne Barnes

1 March 2014
15:00

| (BP) London Wasps | 17 – 21 | Sale Sharks |
| Try: Simpson 48' m Pen: Carlisle (4/4) 17', 20', 24', 46' | Report | Try: Braid 11' c Leota 54' m Con: Cipriani (1/2) 12'; Pen: Cipriani (3/3) 7', 60', 76' |

Adams Park
Attendance: 5,502
Referee: Dean Richards

1 March 2014
15:00

| (BP) Northampton Saints | 39 – 13 | Gloucester |
| Try: Pisi 1' c Clark 55' c Stephenson 64' c Waller 73' c Hooley 77' m Con: Myler (4/5) 2', 56', 65', 75'; Pen: Myler (2/2) 19', 40' | Report | Try: Trinder 6' c Con: Burns (1/1) 7'; Pen: Burns (2/2) 22', 47' |

Franklin's Gardens
Attendance: 13,238
Referee: Tim Wigglesworth

2 March 2014
15:00

| Newcastle Falcons | 18 – 41 | Leicester Tigers (BP) |
| Try: Cato 10' c Lawson 56' m Con: Godman (1/1) 11'; Pen: Smith (1/1) 6'; Godman (1/1) 36' | Report | Try: Goneva (2) 37' m, 61' c Waldrom 67' c Matera 78' c Con: Williams (2/3) 62', 67'; Flood (1/1) 79'; Pen: Williams (5/6) 8', 15', 32', 41', 44' |

Kingston Park
Attendance: 7,073
Referee: Greg Garner

=== Round 17 ===
21 March 2014
19:45

| (BP) Worcester Warriors | 11 – 13 | London Wasps |
| Try: Betty 53' m Pen: Pennell (1/3) 5'; Lamb (1/1) 62' | Report | Try: Cooper-Woolley 80' c Con: Goode (1/1); Pen: Goode (2/2) 28', 42' |

Sixways
Attendance: 7,165
Referee: Andrew Small

22 March 2014
14:00

| Sale Sharks | 19 – 6 | Northampton Saints |
| Try: Cueto 7' c Jones 32' m Brady 38' c Con: Cipriani (2/3) 8', 40' | Report | Pen: Hooley (2/2) 3', 23' |

Salford City Stadium
Attendance: 5,428
Referee: Luke Pearce

22 March 2014
15:00

| (BP) Gloucester | 40 – 33 | Newcastle Falcons (2BP) |
| Try: Kalamafoni 17' c Cook 27' c Hudson 47' c Tindall 55' m May 59' m Con: Cook (3/5) 17', 29', 49'; Pen: Cook (3/3) 34', 42', 76' | Report | Try: York 23' c McGuigan 62' c Saull 67' c Tait 71' m Cato 80' c Con: Godman (1/1) 24'; Hodgson (3/4) 62', 68', 80+2' |

Kingsholm
Attendance: 13,015
Referee: Wayne Barnes

22 March 2014
15:15

| (BP) Saracens | 39 – 17 | Harlequins |
| Try: Ashton 9' c Kruis 26' c Farrell 39' c Burger 57' m Bosch 79' c Con: Farrell (3/4) 10', 27', 40'; Hodgson (1/1) 80'; Pen: Farrell (2/2) 22', 33' | Report | Try: Dickson (1/1) 30' c Smith 42' c Con: Evans (2/2) 30', 43'; Pen: Evans (1/1) 20' |

Wembley Stadium
Attendance: 83,889
Referee: JP Doyle

22 March 2014
17:30

| London Irish | 23 – 44 | Bath (BP) |
| Try: Ojo 31' c Hala'ufia 76' c Con: O'Connor (1/1) 32'; Humphreys (1/1) 76'; Pen: O'Connor (2/2) 23', 37'; Geraghty (1/1) 55' | Report | Try: Eastmond 34' m Watson 55' c Wilson 68' c Garvey 79' c Con: Ford (3/4) 56', 69', 80'; Pen: Ford (6/6) 19', 28', 40+1', 47', 50', 61' |

Madejski Stadium
Attendance: 22,361
Referee: Greg Garner

23 March 2014
14:00

| (BP) Leicester Tigers | 45 – 15 | Exeter Chiefs |
| Try: Tuilagi 8' m Mulipola 12' c Goneva 28' c Thompstone 51' m Mélé (2) 68' c, 78' m Con: Williams (2/4); Flood (1/2); Pen: Williams (3/4) 19', 34', 45' | Report | Try: Yeandle 26' c Whitten 70' m Con: Slade (1/2); Pen: Slade (1) 6' |

Welford Road
Attendance: 23,466
Referee: Dean Richards

=== Round 18 ===
28 March 2014
19:45

| (BP) Bath | 11 – 12 | Sale Sharks |
| Try: Batty 74' m Pen: Ford (2/4) 11', 32' | Report | Pen: Cipriani (4/4) 7', 18', 22', 46' |

The Recreation Ground
Attendance: 11,873
Referee: Dean Richards

29 March 2014
15:00

| (BP) Exeter Chiefs | 13 – 14 | Gloucester |
| Try: Jess 33' m Armand 80+1' m Pen: Slade (1/1) 6' | Report | Try: Sharples 46' m Pen: Cook (3/4) 17', 31', 44' |

Sandy Park
Attendance: 10,171
Referee: Matthew Carley

29 March 2014
15:00

| Harlequins | 23 – 9 | London Irish |
| Try: Evans 11' c Smith 69' m Brown 75' m Con: Evans (1/3); Pen: Evans (2/2) 31', 50' | Report | Pen: O'Connor (3/4) 22', 34', 40+1' |

The Stoop
Attendance: 14,800
Referee: Andrew Small

29 March 2014
15:00

| London Wasps | 20 – 32 | Saracens (BP) |
| Try: Holmes 25' m Howe 48' m Festuccia 79' c Con: Carlisle (1/1); Pen: Andy Goode (1/3) 23' | Report | Try: Wray 13' c George (2) 34' c, 76' m Alex Goode 52' c Con: Hodgson (2/2); Farrell (1/2); Pen: Hodgson (1/2) 2'; Farrell (1/1) 58' |

Adams Park
Attendance: 6,446
Referee: Luke Pearce

- This result meant that Saracens would finish in the top four and therefore a place in the playoffs.

29 March 2014
15:00

| (BP) Northampton Saints | 16 – 22 | Leicester Tigers |
| Try: Fotuali'i 38' m Waller 76' m Pen: Hooley (1/3) 5'; Wilson (1/1) 60' | Report | Try: Allen 15' c Con: Williams (1/1); Pen: Williams (5/5) 20', 28', 58', 63', 65' |

Franklin's Gardens
Attendance: 13,459
Referee: Wayne Barnes

30 March 2014
15:00

| (BP) Newcastle Falcons | 12 – 17 | Worcester Warriors |
| Pen: Godman (4/4) 3', 22', 35', 47' | Report | Try: Drauniniu 70' m Pen: Pennell (2/3) 8', 12'; Lamb (2/3) 44', 53' |

Kingston Park
Attendance: 4,411
Referee: Tim Wigglesworth

=== Round 19 ===
11 April 2014
20:00

| Sale Sharks | 12 – 27 | Harlequins (BP) |
| Try: Brady 5' m penalty try 78' c Con: Cipriani (1/2) | Report | Try: Evans 15' c Care 24' m Smith 45' m Fa'asavalu 71' c Con: Evans (2/4); Pen: Evans (1/1) 19' |

Salford City Stadium
Attendance: 5,837
Referee: Wayne Barnes

12 April 2014
15:00

| (BP) Gloucester | 17 – 18 | Bath |
| Try: Trinder 70' m Pen: Twelvetrees (4/6) 4', 24', 28', 67' | Report | Try: Hooper 54' m penalty try 78' c Con: Ford (1/2); Pen: Ford (2/3) 12', 35' |

Kingsholm
Attendance: 16,121
Referee: Tim Wigglesworth

12 April 2014
15:00

| (BP) Leicester Tigers | 27 – 15 | London Wasps |
| Try: Tuilagi (2) 18' c, 47' m Goneva 40' c Mélé 77' m Con: Williams (2/4); Pen: Williams (1/2) 64' | Report | Try: Thompson 27' c Bell 71' m Con: Goode (1/1); Pen: Goode (1/1) 3' |

Welford Road
Attendance: 24,000
Referee: Andrew Small

12 April 2014
15:00

| (2 BP) Worcester Warriors | 33 – 38 | Exeter Chiefs (BP) |
| Try: Pennell 32' m Lemi (2) 34' c, 63' m Creevy 52' c Con: Lamb (2/4); Pen: Lamb (3/5) 12', 44', 78' | Report | Try: Lewis 9' c Hill 15' c Steenson 24' c Yeandle (2) 40' c, 47' c Con: Steenson (5/5); Pen: Steenson (1/2) 57' |

Sixways
Attendance: 8,820
Referee: JP Doyle

13 April 2014
14:00

| Saracens | 28 – 24 | Northampton Saints (BP) |
| Try: Strettle 8' m Brown 21' c Bosch 54' c Con: Farrell (1/2); Hodgson (1/1); Pen: Farrell (1/2) 40'; Bosch (2/2) 32', 35' | Report | Try: penalty try 17' c Burrell 72' c North 75' c Con: Myler (3/3); Pen: Myler (1/1) 14' |

Allianz Park
Attendance: 9,999
Referee: Matthew Carley

13 April 2014
15:00

| (BP) London Irish | 40 – 12 | Newcastle Falcons |
| Try: Fenby (3) 3' c, 14' m, 35' c Mulchrone 6' c Sheridan 33' c Ellis 40+1' c Con: O'Connor (5/6) | Report | Pen: Clegg (4/4) 5', 11', 18', 30' |

Madejski Stadium
Attendance: 5,614
Referee: Luke Pearce

=== Round 20 ===
18 April 2014
19:45

| Harlequins | 24 – 20 | Leicester Tigers (BP) |
| Try: Penalty try 36' c Brown 69' m Con: Evans (1/1); Pen: Evans (3/4) 7', 26', 57'; Botica (1/1) 77' | Report | Try: Goneva 4' c Gibson 58' c Con: Flood (2/2); Pen: Flood (2/2) 1', 23' |

The Stoop
Attendance: 14,800
Referee: Tim Wigglesworth

19 April 2014
15:00

| (BP) Bath | 32 – 20 | Worcester Warriors |
| Try: Young 20' c Agulla 24' c Abendanon 40' m Banahan 77' c Con: Ford (3/4); Pen: Ford (1/1) 47'; Henson(1/1) 63' | Report | Try: Drauniniu 8' m Symons 55' c Pennell 64' m Con: Pennell (1/2); Pen: Pennell (1/3) 60' |

The Recreation Ground
Attendance: 12,044
Referee: Matthew Carley

19 April 2014
15:00

| Exeter Chiefs | 12 – 55 | Sale Sharks (BP) |
| Try: Vainikolo 36' c Rimmer 77' m Con: Steenson (1/1) | Report | Try: Paterson 9' c Arscott 26' m Tuitupou (2) 28' c, 55' c Peel 63' c Seymour 68' c Brady 73' m Ostrikov 79' c Con: Cipriani (4/5); Ford (2/3); Drop: Ford (1/1) 70' |

Sandy Park
Attendance: 9,467
Referee: Dean Richards

19 April 2014
15:15

| (BP) London Wasps | 38 – 30 | Gloucester |
| Try: Haskell 11' c, 72' c Varndell 22' c Daly 36' c Johnson 59' c Con: Goode (4/4); Carlisle (1/1); Pen: Goode (1/1) 19' | Report | Try: May 13' c Edmonds 64' c Burns 76' c Con: Twelvetrees (3/3); Pen: Twelvetrees (3/3) 28', 31', 40' |

Twickenham
Attendance: 38,294
Referee: Wayne Barnes

20 April 2014
14:00

| (BP) Northampton Saints | 36 – 21 | London Irish |
| Try: Elliott 12' c, 36' c Fotuali'i 29' c Ma'afu 41' m Waller 80' c Con: Myler (3/4); Wilson (1/1); Pen: Myler (1/2) 8' | Report | Try: Fenby 58' c Geraghty 60' c Sinclair 66' c Con: Geraghty (3/3) |

Franklin's Gardens
Attendance: 13,475
Referee: JP Doyle

- This result meant that Northampton would finish in the top four and therefore a place in the playoffs.

20 April 2014
15:00

| (BP) Newcastle Falcons | 18 – 23 | Saracens |
| Try: Sinoti 2' m Fury 75' c Con: Godman (1/1); Pen: Hodgson (2/3) 37', 57' | Report | Try: Streather 10' c Ransom 70' c Con: Hodgson (2/2); Pen: Hodgson (3/3) 17', 41', 67' |

Kingston Park
Attendance: 4,878
Referee: Andrew Small

=== Round 21 ===
2 May 2014
19:45

| Bath | 19 – 19 | Northampton Saints |
| Try: Ford 44' c Con: Ford (1/1); Pen: Ford (4/5) 29', 36', 58', 77' | Report | Try: Elliott 52' c Con: Myler (1/1); Pen: Myler (4/5) 5', 33', 66', 79' |

The Recreation Ground
Attendance: 11,978
Referee: Matthew Carley

3 May 2014
15:00

| (BP) Gloucester | 38 – 30 | London Irish (BP) |
| Try: Kalamafoni 1' c Sharples 8' m Monahan (3) 23' m, 41' m, 75' c Con: Twelvetrees (1/1); Burns (1/4); Pen: Burns (3/3) 51', 72', 80' | Report | Try: Yarde (3) 13' m, 37' c, 61' c Ellis 46' m Con: Humphreys (2/4); Pen: Humphreys (1/1) 68'; Dorrian (1/1) 79' |

Kingsholm
Attendance: 14,915
Referee: Steve Lee

3 May 2014
15:00

| (BP) London Wasps | 44 – 38 | Newcastle Falcons (2 BP) |
| Try: Hughes (2) 20' m, 35' c Johnson 25' c Simpson 38' c Helu 63' m Hayter 70' c Con: Goode (4/6); Pen: Goode (2/2) 31', 67' | Report | Try: Blair 1' c Hodgson 13' c Cato (2) 52' c, 60' c McGuigan 80' c Con: Hodgson (5/5); Pen: Hodgson (1/2) 9' |

Adams Park
Attendance: 6,003
Referee: Dean Richards

3 May 2014
15:00

| (BP) Saracens | 44 – 20 | Worcester Warriors |
| Try: Strettle 4' c Ashton (2) 9' m, 50' m Wray (3) 40' c, 61' c, 64' c Con: Goode (4/6); Pen: Goode (2/2) 14', 47' | Report | Try: Pennell (2) 38' c, 77' m Taulava 72' m Con: Lamb (1/2); Pen: Lamb (1/1) 7' |

Allianz Park
Attendance: 8,247
Referee: Tim Wigglesworth

3 May 2014
15:15

| Sale Sharks | 22 – 42 | Leicester Tigers (BP) |
| Try: Paterson 63' c Thomas 72' m Leota 74' c Con: Ford (2/3); Pen: Cipriani (1/1) 18' | Report | Try: Goneva 14' c Flood (2) 37' c, 53' c Morris 44' c Penalty try 58' c Mélé 80' c Con: Williams (6/6) |

Salford City Stadium
Attendance: 10,092
Referee: JP Doyle

4 May 2014
14:00

| (BP) Exeter Chiefs | 29 – 30 | Harlequins (BP) |
| Try: Lewis 15' c Jess 44' c Con: Steenson (2/2); Pen: Steenson (5/5) 7', 23', 40', 60', 72' | Report | Try: Monye 17' m Evans 46' c Care 66' c Guest 74' m Con: Evans (2/4); Pen: Evans (2/2) 52', 59' |

Sandy Park
Attendance: 10,199
Referee: Andrew Small

=== Round 22 ===
All games in Round 22 kicked off at 15:15 on 10 May 2014, so as to not give any team a potential advantage with regards to knowing how to achieve a play-off berth, European Rugby Champions Cup place, or safety from relegation.

10 May 2014
15:15

| Harlequins | 19 – 16 | Bath (BP) |
| Try: Brown 15' c Con: Evans (1/1); Pen: Evans (4/5) 35', 52', 56', 67' | Report | Try: Ford 22'c Con: Ford (1/1); Pen: Ford (3/3) 44', 65', 68' |

The Stoop
Attendance: 14,700
Referee: Wayne Barnes

10 May 2014
15:15

| (BP) Leicester Tigers | 31 – 27 | Saracens (2 BPs) |
| Try: Penalty try 39' c Tuilagi 43' c Scully 47' c Kitchener 56' c Con: Flood (4/4); Pen: Williams (1/2) 5' | Report | Try: Spencer (2) 1' m, 75' c Penalty try 53' c Wilson 58' m Con: Spencer (2/3); Pen: Hodgson (1/1) 9' |

Welford Road
Attendance: 24,000
Referee: Greg Garner

10 May 2014
15:15

| London Irish | 22 – 20 | Sale Sharks (BP) |
| Try: Fenby (2) 6' c, 62' m Yarde 50' c Con: O'Connor (2/3); Pen: O'Connor (1/4) 39' | Report | Try: Easter 4' c Arscott 22' c Con: Ford (2/2); Pen: Ford (2/2) 30', 45' |

Madejski Stadium
Attendance: 8,791
Referee: Greg Macdonald

10 May 2014
15:15

| Newcastle Falcons | 13 – 23 | Exeter Chiefs |
| Try: Wilson 80+1' c Con: Godman (1/1); Pen: Hodgson (2/2) 3', 7' | Report | Try: Cowan-Dickie 10' m White 37' c Vainikolo 79' m Con: Slade (1/2); Pen: Slade (2/2) 27', 57' |

Kingston Park
Attendance: 4,555
Referee: Craig Maxwell-Keys

10 May 2014
15:15

| (BP) Northampton Saints | 74 – 13 | London Wasps |
| Try: North (2) 20' c, 63' m Dowson (2) 24' m, 78' c Myler 27' c Burrell 38' m Dickson (2) 42' c, 60' c Foden 54' c K. Pisi 67' c Stephenson 74' c Con: Myler (3/5); Wilson (5/6); Pen: Myler (1/1) 33' | Report | Try: Davies 3' m Varndell 14' m Pen: Carlisle (1/1) 12' |

Franklin's Gardens
Attendance: 13,459
Referee: Luke Pearce

10 May 2014
15:15

| Worcester Warriors | 28 – 27 | Gloucester (2 BPs) |
| Try: Taulava 31' m Lamb 40' c Drauniniu 52' c Con: Lamb (2/3); Pen: Lamb (3/3) 19', 67', 76' | Report | Try: May (2) 11' m, 61' c Monahan 14' m Morgan 22' c Con: Burns (2/4); Pen: Burns (1/2) 73' |

Sixways
Attendance: 11,852
Referee: JP Doyle

== Play-offs ==
As in previous seasons, the top four teams in the Premiership table, following the conclusion of the regular season, contest the play-off semi-finals in a 1st vs 4th and 2nd vs 3rd format, with the higher ranking team having home advantage. The two winners of the semi-finals then meet in the Premiership Final at Twickenham on 31 May 2014.

=== Bracket ===
Semi-finals
1 | Northampton Saints | 21
4 | Leicester Tigers | 20
2 | Saracens | 31
3 | Harlequins | 17

Final
1 | Northampton Saints | 24
2 | Saracens | 20

=== Semi-finals ===
16 May 2014
19:45

| Northampton Saints | 21 – 20 | Leicester Tigers |
| Try: North 64' c Wood 77' m Con: Myler (1/2); Pen: Myler (3/3) 22', 29', 46' | Report | Try: Tuilagi 24' c B. Youngs 34' c Con: Flood (2/2); Pen: Flood (1/1) 9'; Williams (1/1) 72' |

Franklin's Gardens
Attendance: 13,491
Referee: JP Doyle

17 May 2014
14:00

| Saracens | 31 – 17 | Harlequins |
| Try: K. Brown 34' m Barritt 52' c Ashton 61' c Con: Farrell (2/3); Pen: Farrell (4/6) 8', 17', 56', 73' | Report | Try: Monye 32' c M. Brown 40' c Con: Evans (2/2); Pen: Evans (1/2) 5' |

Allianz Park
Attendance: 9,962
Referee: Wayne Barnes

=== Final ===
The final was contested at Twickenham between the winners of the two semi-finals. For the first time, the final went to extra time as the teams finished the regulation 80 minutes at 14 all.

31 May 2014
15:00

| Northampton Saints | 24–20 (a.e.t.) | Saracens |
| Try: Foden 31' c G. Pisi 58' c A. Waller 100' c Con: Myler (3/3); Pen: Myler (1/1) 83' | Report | Try: Bosch 72' m Pen: Farrell (3/4) 11', 17', 44'; Hodgson (2/2) 85', 92' |

Twickenham
Attendance: 81,193
Referee: JP Doyle

Team details

Northampton Saints
Saracens

| FB | 15 | (England) Ben Foden |
| RW | 14 | (Samoa) Ken Pisi |
| OC | 13 | (Samoa) George Pisi |
| IC | 12 | (England) Luther Burrell |
| LW | 11 | (Wales) George North |
| FH | 10 | (England) Stephen Myler |
| SH | 9 | (Samoa) Kahn Fotuali'i |
| N8 | 8 | (England) Sam Dickinson |
| OF | 7 | (England) Tom Wood |
| BF | 6 | (England) Calum Clark |
| RL | 5 | (England) Courtney Lawes |
| LL | 4 | (United States) Samu Manoa |
| TP | 3 | (Australia) Salesi Ma'afu |
| HK | 2 | (England) Mike Haywood |
| LP | 1 | (England) Alex Corbisiero |
Replacements:
| HK | 16 | (England) Dylan Hartley |
| PR | 17 | (England) Alex Waller |
| PR | 18 | (England) Tom Mercey |
| LK | 19 | (England) Christian Day |
| FL | 20 | (England) Phil Dowson |
| SH | 21 | (England) Lee Dickson |
| FH | 22 | (New Zealand) James Wilson |
| CE | 23 | (England) Tom Stephenson |
Coach:
(England)

| FB | 15 | (England) Alex Goode |
| RW | 14 | (England) Chris Ashton |
| OC | 13 | (Argentina) Marcelo Bosch |
| IC | 12 | (England) Brad Barritt |
| LW | 11 | (England) David Strettle |
| FH | 10 | (England) Owen Farrell |
| SH | 9 | (South Africa) Neil de Kock |
| N8 | 8 | (England) Billy Vunipola |
| OF | 7 | (Namibia) Jacques Burger |
| BF | 6 | (Scotland) Kelly Brown |
| RL | 5 | (England) Mouritz Botha |
| LL | 4 | (England) Steve Borthwick |
| TP | 3 | (England) Matt Stevens |
| HK | 2 | (South Africa) Schalk Brits |
| LP | 1 | (England) Richard Barrington |
Substitutions:
| HK | 16 | (England) Jamie George |
| PR | 17 | (Wales) Rhys Gill |
| PR | 18 | (Samoa) James Johnston |
| LK | 19 | (South Africa) Alistair Hargreaves |
| FL | 20 | (England) Jackson Wray |
| SH | 21 | (England) Richard Wigglesworth |
| FH | 22 | (England) Charlie Hodgson |
| WG | 23 | (United States) Chris Wyles |
Coach:
(England)

== Leading scorers ==
Note: Flags indicate national union as has been defined under WR eligibility rules. Players may hold more than one non-WR nationality.

=== Most points ===
| Rank | Player | Club | Points |
|---|---|---|---|
| 1 | (England) George Ford | Bath | 250 |
| 2 | (England) Stephen Myler | Northampton Saints | 245 |
| 3 | (New Zealand) Nick Evans | Harlequins | 194 |
| 4 | (Ireland) Gareth Steenson | Exeter Chiefs | 191 |
| 5 | (England) Owen Farrell | Saracens | 157 |
| 6 | (England) Andy Goode | London Wasps | 147 |
| 7 | (England) Danny Cipriani | Sale Sharks | 143 |
| 8 | (Wales) Owen Williams | Leicester Tigers | 133 |
| 9 | (England) Freddie Burns | Gloucester | 122 |
| 10 | (England) Toby Flood | Leicester Tigers | 114 |

=== Most tries ===
| Rank | Player | Club | Tries |
|---|---|---|---|
| 1 | (Fiji) Vereniki Goneva | Leicester Tigers | 12 |
| 2 | (England) David Strettle | Saracens | 11 |
| 3 | (England) Jonny May | Gloucester | 9 |
| 4 | (England) Chris Ashton | Saracens | 8 |
| 4 | (England) Mark Cueto | Sale Sharks | 8 |
| 4 | (England) Sam Smith | Harlequins | 8 |
| 4 | (England) Marland Yarde | London Irish | 8 |
| 8 | (Wales) George North | Northampton Saints | 7 |
| 9 | 8 players tied | | 6 |

== Awards ==
The following received Player of the Month awards during the 2013–14 season, as selected by a panel of media commentators, in addition to monthly public polls.

| Month | Nationality | Player | Position | Club |
|---|---|---|---|---|
| September | Namibia | Jacques Burger | Flanker | Saracens |
| October | United States | Samu Manoa | Lock | Northampton |
| November | England | George Ford | Fly-Half | Bath |
| December | England | Nick Easter | Number 8 | Harlequins |
| January | England | Dylan Hartley | Hooker | Northampton |
| February | Fiji | Vereniki Goneva | Wing | Leicester |
| March | England | Danny Cipriani | Fly-Half | Sale |
| April | England | Chris Ashton | Wing | Saracens |

== Retirements ==
- 7 October 2013 Andrew Higgins (Newcastle Falcons) retired, aged 32, due to a knee injury.
- 9 October 2013 Olly Morgan (Gloucester) retired, aged 27, due to knee injuries.
- 18 December 2013 Brett Deacon (Leicester Tigers) retired, aged 31, due to contracting lupus.
