= Mulchrone =

Mulchrone is a surname. Notable people with the surname include:

- Charlie Mulchrone (born 1989), British rugby union player
- Fergus Mulchrone (born 1986), English rugby union player
- Kathleen Mulchrone (1895–1973), Irish Celtic scholar
- Vincent Mulchrone (1923–1977), British journalist
