= Ryan Lamb =

English rugby union player (born 1986)

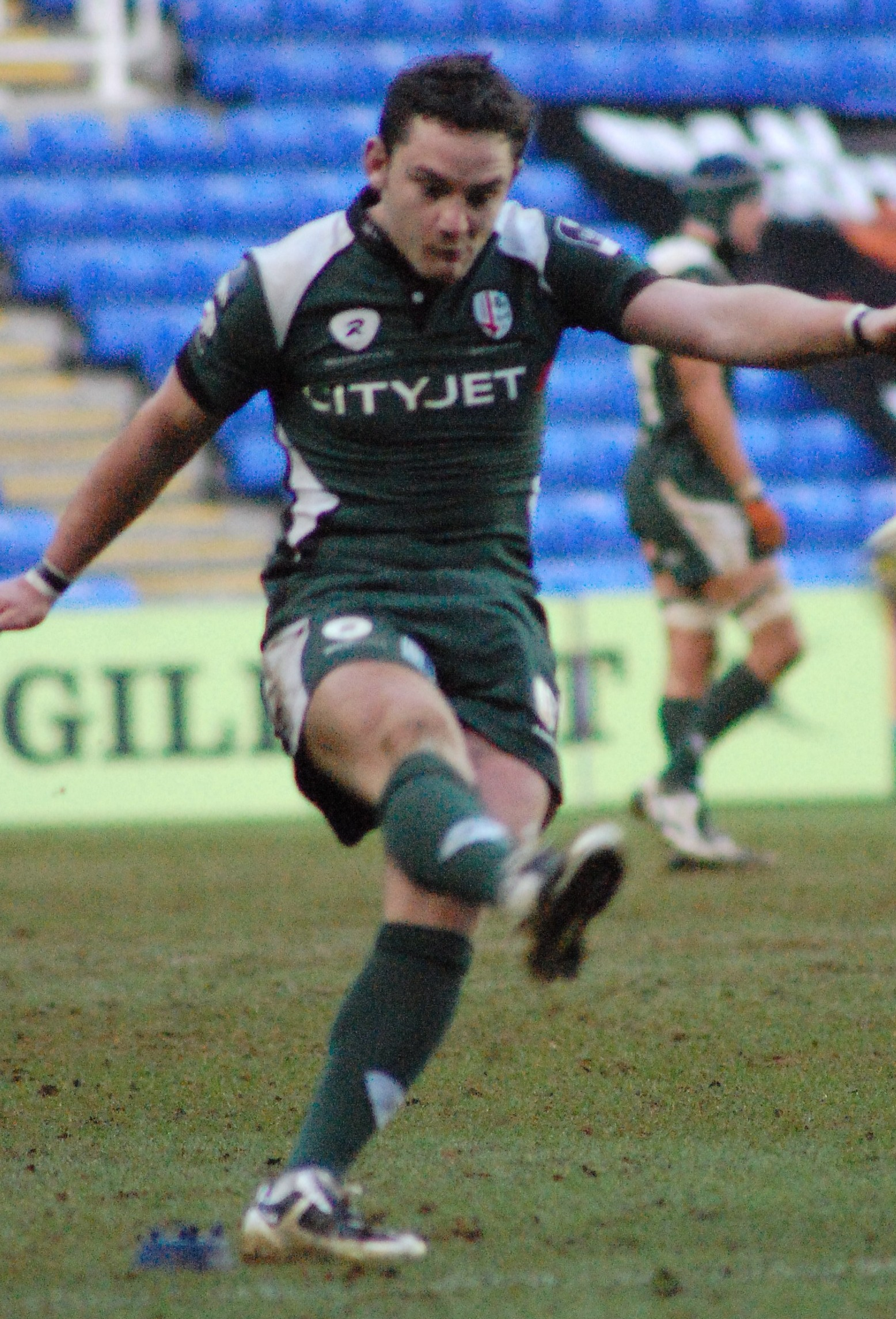
- Lamb in 2010
- Born: Ryan Lamb; 18 May 1986 (age 40) Gloucester, England
- Height: 1.75 m (5 ft 9 in)
- Weight: 88 kg (13 st 12 lb)
- School: Severn Vale School; St Peter's High School

Rugby union career
- Position: Fly-half
- Current team: Plymouth Albion
Senior career
Years	Team	Apps	(Points)
2004–2009	Gloucester	85	(569)
2009-2011	London Irish	49	(390)
2011-2013	Northampton Saints	55	(370)
2013-2014	Leicester Tigers	6	(29)
2014-2017	Worcester Warriors	51	(246)
2017–2019	La Rochelle	18	(88)
2019	Scarlets	6	(5)
- Correct as of 1 January 2020
International career
Years	Team	Apps	(Points)
2007–2008	England Saxons	5	(46)

Ryan Lamb (born 18 May 1986 in Gloucester) is an English former rugby union player who played at fly-half.

== Club career ==
A former pupil of St Peter's High School, he made his professional debut in the European Challenge Cup quarter final against Brive in 2006 which Gloucester Rugby won comfortably. Lamb started in the subsequent final, as Gloucester defeated his future club, London Irish.

He became first choice at Fly-half for Gloucester Rugby as they topped the table during the 2006–07 Guinness Premiership and 2007–08 Guinness Premiership seasons. However, they were thwarted in the play-offs in both seasons by the Leicester Tigers.

Gloucester's continued failures in key games saw Dean Ryan lose faith in Lamb. He was dropped after Gloucester's home Heineken Cup defeat to Cardiff Blues in January 2009 amid concern that he failed to exercise sufficient control over games.

Lamb was released by Gloucester at the end of the 2008–09 season. Lamb signed for London Irish.

During the Guinness Premiership match between London Irish and Sale Sharks on 28 March 2010, Lamb successfully converted a penalty to take his points tally for that competition past the 500-mark. On 24 March 2011, he signed a contract that took him to Northampton Saints for the 2011/12 season. On 20 February 2013, Lamb would leave Northampton Saints to join Leicester Tigers for the 2013/14 season. However, on 10 February 2014, Lamb left Leicester Tigers after seven months to join with Worcester Warriors with immediate effect, where he rejoined Director of Rugby Dean Ryan at the Sixways Stadium. He scored the winning conversion as Worcester were promoted back to the Aviva Premiership for the 2015–2016 season, beating Bristol 59–58 on aggregate.

On 19 May 2017, Lamb left Worcester for France, joining the Top 14 club La Rochelle on a two-year deal ahead of the 2017–18 season. On 20 September 2019, Lamb returns to the UK to join Welsh region Scarlets in the Pro14 as cover during the 2019 Rugby World Cup. Following his stint with Wales, Lamb announces his retirement from professional rugby with immediate effect.

== International career ==
In 2006, Lamb represented England at the IRB U21 World Championship. He debuted for the England Saxons on his 21st birthday against the USA at the 2007 Churchill Cup. Lamb was also part of the Saxons side that defeated Ireland A on 1 February 2008 and competed at the 2008 Churchill Cup, which the Saxons won.

== Personal life ==
Lamb was arrested in the early hours of 1 March 2009 outside Subtone, a nightclub in Cheltenham. Lamb was charged with assault, and was later fined for the incident.

On 9 May 2010, Lamb was hit in the face with a bottle after an altercation involving fellow London Irish players and supporters of Chelsea Football Club in Clapham. He was taken to hospital but was not seriously injured.

== Coaching career ==
Following his retirement, Lamb returns to his hometown of Gloucester where he became the new Backs and Attack coach for Hartpury University who compete in the RFU Championship.

More recently, Lamb has been sharing his vast experience as backs coach at National League One club Plymouth Albion. Alongside another former professional Damien Welch, Lamb has been responsible for developing a new squad during COVID times at the Brickfields-based club.
