= Taulava =

Taulava is a surname. Notable people with the surname include:

- Asi Taulava (born 1973), Tongan-born Filipino basketball player
- Semisi Taulava (born 1983), Tongan rugby union player
