= Eamonn Sheridan =

English rugby union player

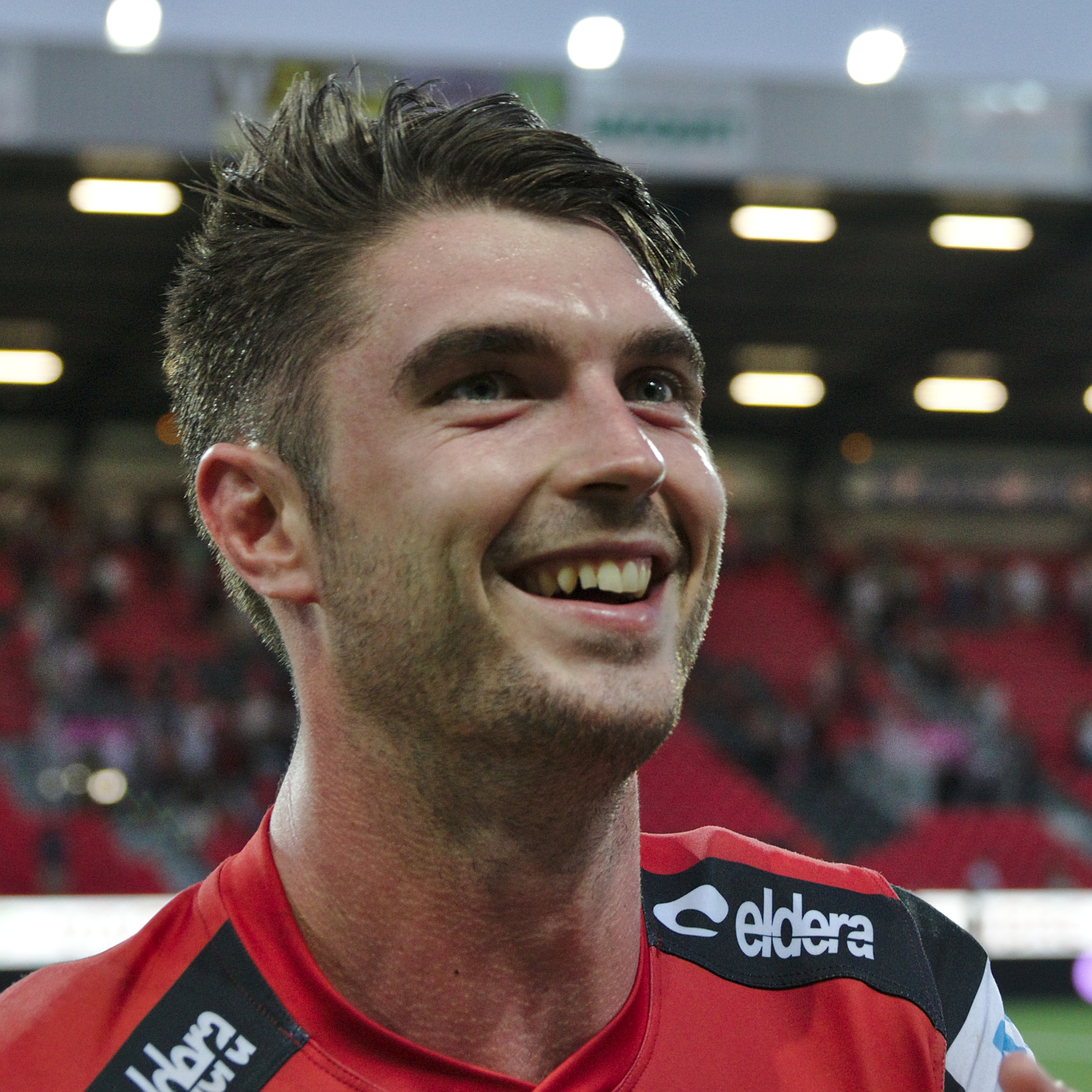
- Born: Eamonn Peter Sheridan; 14 May 1989 (age 37) Birmingham, West Midlands, England
- Height: 1.94 m (6 ft 4 in)
- Weight: 108 kg (17 st 0 lb)
- School: St. Patrick's Classical School

Rugby union career
- Position: Centre
Senior career
Years	Team	Apps	(Points)
2008–2012	Leinster	3	(0)
2012–2013	Rotherham Titans	22	(40)
2013–2015	London Irish	35	(15)
2015–2017	Oyonnax	33	(15)
2017–2018	US Carcassonne	10	(0)
2018–2019	RC Massy	22	(10)
- Correct as of 15 April 2021
International career
Years	Team	Apps	(Points)
2006–08	Ireland U18		
2008–09	Ireland U20	16	(0)

Eamonn Peter Sheridan (born 14 May 1989) is a retired professional rugby union player, who played in the Top 14, English Premiership and the Pro12. Prior to finishing his club career in France he represented Leinster in the Pro12, Rotherham Titans in the RFU Championship and London Irish in the English Premiership. Sheridan has also represented Ireland under-18s and under-20s at international level.

== Club career ==
At 6'4' and 108 kg Sheridan is a physical presence with the ability to play at both inside and outside centre. Born in Birmingham, Sheridan was educated at St. Patrick's Classical School in Navan, Ireland. He spent four years in the Leinster Academy as well as making three First Team appearances in the Pro12.

Sheridan joined Championship side Rotherham Titans for the 2012–13 season. Making 19 appearances in the league and three in the British & Irish Cup, including Rotherham's 59–26 win over Plymouth Albion in which he scored two tries.

London Irish announced, on 10 April 2013, the signing of Sheridan as well as fellow Rotherham Titan centre Fergus Mulchrone, both penning two-year contracts. Sheridan made his Irish debut on 7 September 2013 at Twickenham in the 42–20 defeat to Saracens. Sheridan made a great start to his London Irish career, voted by the supporters as the best player in the opening five Premiership matches. In the 2013–2014 season Sheridan formed a formidable centre partnership with Fergus Mulchrone in both defence and attack making 24 appearances and scoring four tries.

Oyonnax Rugby announced, on 27 March 2015, the signing of Sheridan on a two-year deal via the team's official Twitter account. Sheridan scored his first try on his debut against Bordeaux Bègles on Saturday 29 August 2015.

== International career ==
Though he was born in England, Sheridan represented Ireland under-18s and under-20s at international level. After a number of strong performances, notably against Worcester Warriors, Sheridan was backed by then London Irish Director of Rugby Brian Smith to go on and make full international honours.
