= Sam Smith (rugby union) =

English rugby union player

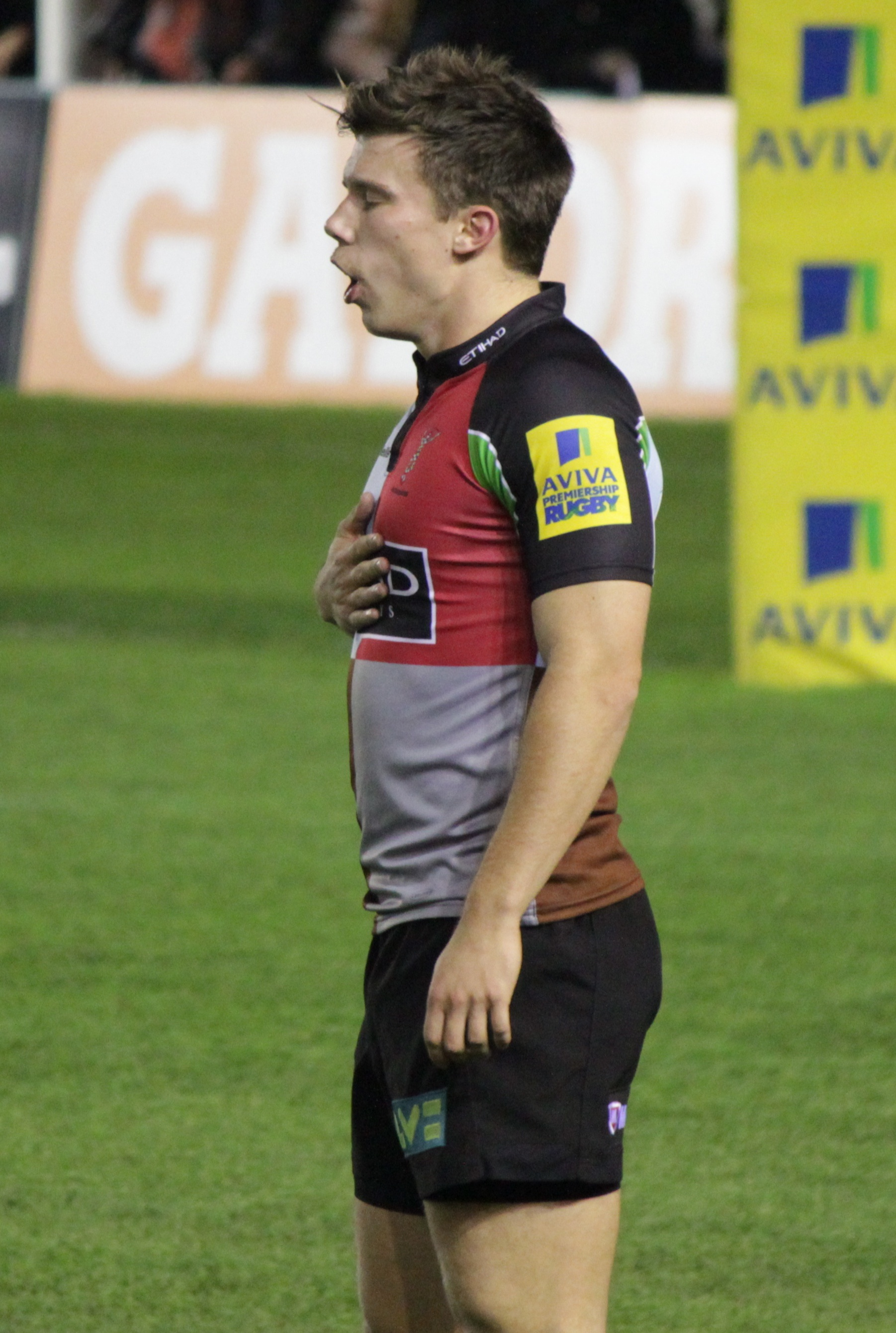
- Born: Sam Smith; 6 June 1990 (age 36) Epsom, Surrey, England
- Height: 1.88 m (6 ft 2 in)
- Weight: 95 kg (209 lb; 14 st 13 lb)
- School: Cranleigh School

Rugby union career
- Position: Wing
Amateur team(s)
Years	Team	Apps	(Points)
2003–2005	Guildford Rugby Club		
Senior career
Years	Team	Apps	(Points)
2009–2014	Harlequins	78	(140)
2010–2011	→ Esher	11	(5)
2014–2016	Worcester Warriors	13	(55)
- Correct as of 21 February 2015
International career
Years	Team	Apps	(Points)
2010	England U20	7	(10)

Sam Smith (born 6 June 1990 in Epsom, Surrey, England), is a former English rugby union player. He played on the wing.

Smith made his first grade debut in the LV= Cup for Harlequins against the Newcastle Falcons on 15 November 2009.

His father Simon Smith played for Wasps and gained 9 caps for England between 1985 and 1986. His mother rowed for Cambridge and Great Britain.

In 2014, Smith was signed by Worcester Warriors Director of Rugby Dean Ryan following the departure of wing David Lemi. Smith remained at the club until 2016, when he retired from rugby after a quadriceps injury not healing fully.

He now runs a coffee shop called Wayland's Yard at 6 Foregate Street in Worcester.
