= Jack Wilson (rugby union) =

NZ rugby union player

- Full name: Jack Hedly Wilson
- Born: 2 December 1989 (age 36) Tauranga, Bay of Plenty, New Zealand
- Height: 1.89 m (6 ft 2 1/2 in)
- Weight: 103 kg (227 lb)
- School: King's College
- University: University of Canterbury

Rugby union career
- Position: Wing
Senior career
Years	Team	Apps	(Points)
2013–2014	Saracens	19	(30)
2016−	Bath		
- Correct as of 30 July 2015
Provincial / State sides
Years	Team	Apps	(Points)
2012	Bay of Plenty	8	(0)
2015–2016	Otago	14	(30)
- Correct as of 28 October 2016
Super Rugby
Years	Team	Apps	(Points)
2015	Sharks	4	(5)
2016−	Highlanders	5	(10)
- Correct as of 31 July 2016
National sevens teams
Years	Team		Comps
2012	New Zealand		3
2014–2016	England		4

Jack Hedly Wilson (born 2 December 1989) is a New Zealand rugby union player, currently playing with Bath in the Aviva Premiership. His regular position is winger.

== Career ==
=== New Zealand Sevens ===
In 2012, Wilson was included in a New Zealand Sevens training squad and represented them during the 2011–12 IRB Sevens World Series, making his debut at the 2012 Hong Kong Sevens tournament in March of that year.

=== Bay of Plenty ===
He returned to the 15-man version of the game and played for his local side Bay of Plenty during the 2012 ITM Cup. He made his debut for Bay of Plenty starting on the left wing in their opening-day 37–22 defeat to Taranaki in Mount Maunganui. He made a total of eight appearances during the competition, starting five of those but failing to score any tries for his side as they finished in sixth spot in the competition.

=== Saracens ===
At the end of 2012, Wilson made the move to England to join English Premiership side Saracens. He made his debut for Saracens in the 19–11 victory over the Cardiff Blues in the Anglo-Welsh Cup, coming on as a first-half substitute and made a further two appearances in the same competition, starting their match against Worcester Warriors and playing off the bench against the Sale Sharks.

He made his English Premiership debut during the 2013–14 English Premiership season. He made two substitute appearances against Harlequins and London Wasps before getting his first start in their match against the Sale Sharks and marking the occasion by scoring his first senior try for the club shortly after half-time in a 24–19 victory. He repeated his try-scoring feat in their next match against Leicester Tigers, taking just five minutes to get on the scoresheet, and scored one further try in the final round of matches in the pool stage, a 31–27 defeat against the same opposition, making a total of nine appearances during the competition and starting five of those to help his side finish top of the log. However, he didn't feature in the play-offs, with Saracens reaching the final where they lost 24–20 to the Northampton Saints after extra time. In addition to playing in the Premiership, Wilson also started all five of Saracens' matches during the 2013–14 LV Cup competition, scoring two tries as the side reached the semi-finals of the competition.

Wilson played two matches for Saracens in the 2014–15 LV Cup competition, scoring a try against Harlequins, but failed to make any appearances for the side in the 2014–15 English Premiership competition.

=== Sharks ===
With limited opportunities at Saracens, Wilson returned to the southern hemisphere prior to the 2015 Super Rugby season, joining South African side the Sharks at the end of 2014. He made five appearances off the bench for the Sharks during the tournament and scored a try in a 27–10 victory over the Cheetahs in Round Five of the competition.

=== Bath ===
On 4 October 2016, Wilson returns to England as he signed for Bath in the Aviva Premiership for the remainder of the 2016–17 season.
