= Samu Manoa =

American rugby union player (born 1985)

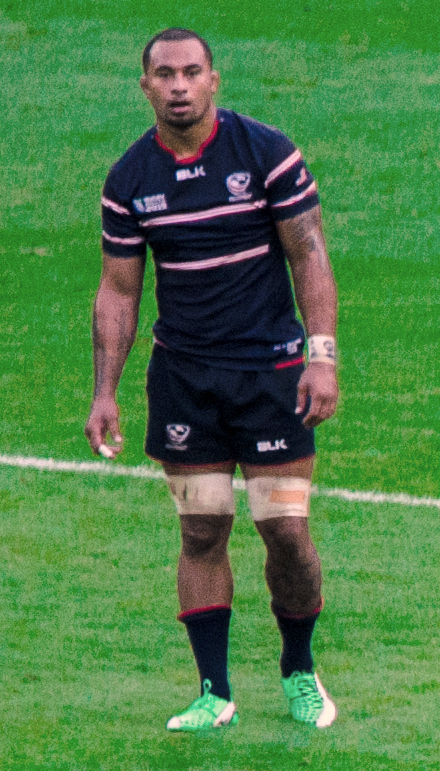
- Manoa with the USA Eagles in the 2015 Rugby World Cup
- Born: 15 March 1985 (age 41) Concord, California, United States
- Height: 1.98 m (6 ft 6 in)
- Weight: 127 kg (20 st 0 lb; 280 lb)
- Occupation: Rugby union player

Rugby union career
- Position(s): Lock; Number 8
Amateur team(s)
Years	Team	Apps	(Points)
2003–2010	SFGG		
Senior career
Years	Team	Apps	(Points)
2011–2015	Northampton Saints	122	(130)
2015–2018	Toulon	55	(15)
2018	Cardiff Blues	7	(5)
2019–2023	Seattle Seawolves	33	(15)
- Correct as of 7 August 2023
International career
Years	Team	Apps	(Points)
2010	USA Selects	3	(10)
2010–2018	United States	22	(10)
2013	Barbarians	2	(0)
- Correct as of 18 June 2018

Samu Manoa (born March 5, 1985) is an American rugby union player who plays for the Seattle Seawolves in Major League Rugby (MLR). Manoa was described in 2014 by ESPNscrum.com as "perhaps the finest No. 8 playing the game in the northern hemisphere." He retired from international rugby in 2019 with 22 caps.

== Early career ==
Manoa was born in Concord, California, but spent several years in Tonga and Hawaii during his childhood. He started playing rugby at 13 years old with his family. His coaches through his early years were his father and his uncle, Va'inga Manoa and Hu'ufifale (himself a rugby star in his youth in Tonga before emigrating to Hawaii). Manoa played for San Francisco Golden Gate RFC from 2003-2011. He helped SFGG win the U.S. Rugby Super League in 2009 and 2011. In his final game for the Golden Gate, Manoa again showed his nose for the tryline, opening the scoring as his side claimed the title once more. San Francisco Golden Gate were national runners up in 2010.

== Professional rugby ==
=== English Premiership ===
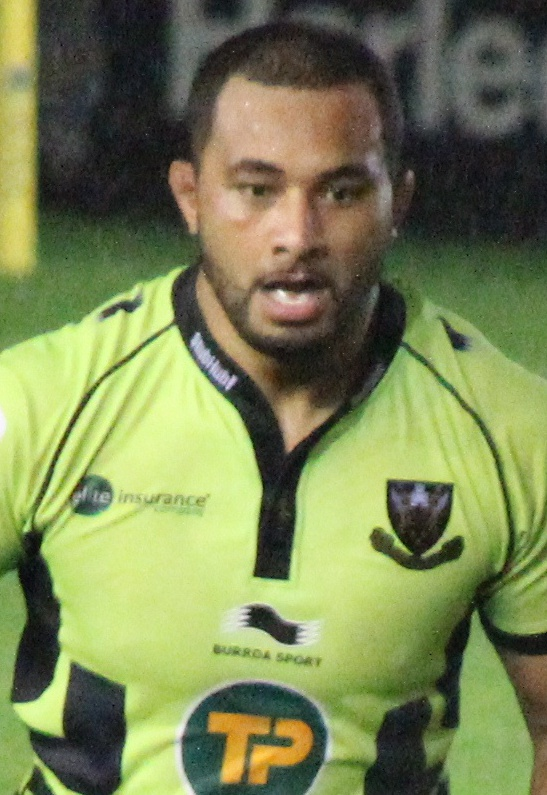
Manoa playing for Northampton in 2013

In April 2011 Manoa signed for English Premiership side Northampton Saints for the 2011–12 season. Northampton were impressed with his ball skills, pace and physicality. In autumn 2011 Manoa hit the ground running for the Saints with a series of powerful performances in the early rounds of Premiership Rugby and worked himself into Northampton's starting rotation. A series of outstanding performances earned him man of the match awards in wins over Castres and Harlequins, and the big second row fast became an integral part of the Saints squad. Over the course of the 2011-12 season, Manoa played in 18 Premiership games for the Saints, with 14 starts. Manoa was named by ESPN to the 2011-12 Premiership "Dream Team."

On February 15, 2012 Manoa signed a three-year contract extension with Northampton Saints. He was honoured with the Northampton Saints Supporters' Player of the Year for the 2012-13 Premiership season. During the 2013-14 season Manoa replicated his success and subsequently was short-listed for the RPA Player's Player of the Year award and the Premiership Player of the Year. Furthermore, for the second year in succession Manoa was voted the Saints Supporters' Player of the Season. In 2014 Manoa started as Northampton beat Saracens to win the Premiership. He achieved his first English Premiership hat trick on October 11, 2014 as Northampton dominated Sale Sharks 43-10. Just two months later he achieved another hat trick in a substitute appearance in which Saints drubbed Benetton Treviso 67-0 in the European Rugby Champions Cup. On the back of several strong performances in the Premiership and Champions Cup, Manoa won the Premiership Player of the Month for December 2014.

=== Top 14 ===
On December 21, 2014, Toulon owner, Mourad Boudjellal confirmed that Manoa signed with Toulon on a four-year contract, the first type of contract to be offered by the club. One week after making his debut for Toulon, Manoa scored his first try for the club in their 52-8 win over Montpellier in November 2015.

=== Major League Rugby ===
Manoa has played with the Seattle Seawolves of Major League Rugby since 2019.

== Internationals ==
=== United States national team ===
Manoa played six matches with the U.S. Select XV and the USA A sides from 2009 to 2010, including Americas Rugby Championship fixtures. He was called up to the U.S. national team for the 2010 end of year tests. He earned his US international debut with a start against Georgia in November 2010, and also started matches against Scotland A and Saracens. His 2011 contract with Northampton Saints prevented him from playing for the US in the 2011 Rugby World Cup. Manoa retired from international rugby prior to the 2019 World Cup, but continued his club career with the Seattle Seawolves.

=== Barbarians ===
On 1 June 2013 Manoa gained his first cap for the Barbarians playing alongside his fellow USA eagle, Takudzwa Ngwenya, against the Lions in Hong Kong.

== Club statistics ==
As of match played 7 August 2023.

Club statistics
Club	Season	League			Europe		Anglo-Welsh Cup		Other		Total	
Club	Season	Division	Apps	Tries	Apps	Tries	Apps	Tries	Apps	Tries	Apps	Tries
Northampton Saints	2011–12	English Premiership	18	0	6	1	3	0	1	1	28	2
Northampton Saints	2012–13	English Premiership	24	2	6	0	3	2	—		33	2
Northampton Saints	2013–14	English Premiership	21	6	8	1	3	3	—		32	10
Northampton Saints	2014–15	English Premiership	21	8	7	4	1	0	—		29	13
Toulon	2015–16	Top 14	8	1	3	0	—				11	1
Toulon	2016–17	Top 14	17	0	6	0	—				23	0
Toulon	2017–18	Top 14	18	1	3	1	—				21	2
Cardiff Blues	2018–19	Pro14	3	1	4	0	0	0	—		7	1
Seattle Seawolves	2019	Major League Rugby	5	0	—						5	0
Seattle Seawolves	2021	Major League Rugby	7	1	—						7	1
Seattle Seawolves	2022	Major League Rugby	14	0	—						14	0
Seattle Seawolves	2023	Major League Rugby	7	2	—						7	2
Total			163	22	43	7	10	3	1	1	217	33

== Personal life ==
Samuela Va’inga Manoa aka Samu Manoa is of Tongan, and part Uvea, Irish, and English descent. He is the eldest son of Va`inga-`I Moana Manoa and Patricia Dixon Mataele. Manoa's father was a star athlete at Santa Ana High School. Manoa's paternal grandfather and namesake, Samuela Mafana Ikani Manoa ("Mafana"), was a star rugby player from the village of Nukunuku in Tonga. He captained the South Seas Islanders during the 60s, and his father was also an international. His paternal grandmother, Kalolaine Tupou Veiongo Manoa [Aholelei] reared Manoa. Manoa has two siblings on his father's side, a brother Wesley, and a sister, Lilio Daphne. And has 7 on his mother’s side, 4 brothers and 3 sisters. Joseph, Charlotte, Luke, Canton, Destiny, Falcon, and Chevonne.

Manoa is married to his high school sweetheart Mary-Lorraine Masi'ata Lavaka-Manoa. They have 8 children now.
