= Gerard Ellis =

Welsh rugby player

- Born: Gerard Ellis; 25 October 1993 (age 33)
- Height: 183 cm (6 ft 0 in)
- Weight: 120 kg (18 st 13 lb)
- School: Llandovery College

Rugby union career
- Position: Loose head
Senior career
Years	Team	Apps	(Points)
2012–17	London Irish	72	(30)
2017–19 2018	Dragons →Bedford Blues	27; 2	(15)
2019–2020	Coventry	8	(15)
- Correct as of 09:22, 16 Jul 2020 (UTC)
International career
Years	Team	Apps	(Points)
- Wales U18

Gerard Ellis (born 25 October 1993) was a Welsh rugby union player who played as a loose head.

Ellis made his debut for Coventry in 2019. having previously played for London Irish, Dragons and Llandovery RFC.
