= Tom Brady (rugby union) =

English rugby union player (born 1991)

- Born: 10 February 1991 (age 35) Urmston, Greater Manchester, England
- Height: 1.84 m (6 ft 0 in)
- Weight: 98 kg (15 st 6 lb)

Rugby union career
- Position: Wing
Senior career
| Years | Team | Apps | (Points) |
| 2008–2016 | Sale Sharks | 132 | (145) |
| 2016–2018 | Leicester Tigers | 24 | (10) |
| 2018–2019 | US Carcassonne | 8 | (5) |
- Correct as of 6 March 2018

Thomas Brady (born 10 February 1991) is a professional rugby union player who last played for the Leicester Tigers in Premiership Rugby. Previously Sale Sharks in Premiership Rugby. He plays on the wing. He currently plays in National League 1 for Sale FC.

On 29 February 2016 it was announced he had signed for Leicester Tigers for the 2016/17 season. He made his starting debut against his old side Sale in Salford and made his first start at Welford Road against Worcester on 8 October 2016 where he also scored his first try for the club. Tom scored the winning try vs Exeter Chiefs in the Anglo Welsh Cup Final at The Stoop in his first season with the club. He was released by the Tigers in 2018.
