= Tim Streather =

English rugby union player

- Born: 14 June 1988 (age 38) Worcester, England
- Height: 1.81 m (5 ft 11 1/2 in)
- Weight: 87 kg (13 st 10 lb)

Rugby union career
- Position(s): Centre, Wing
Senior career
Years	Team	Apps	(Points)
2009–2013	Nottingham	69	(160)
2013–2017	Saracens	22	(25)
- Correct as of 15 February 2015

Tim Streather (born 14 June 1988) is a retired rugby union player who last played for Saracens in the Aviva Premiership. His position is Centre, although he can also play as a Wing. He was Nottingham's player of the season for 2009. He was contracted with Nottingham until 2013. He won the RFU Championship Player of the Year award for the 2012–13 season. He joined Saracens in 2013. He retired in 2017.
