= Ashley Johnson (rugby union) =

South African rugby union player

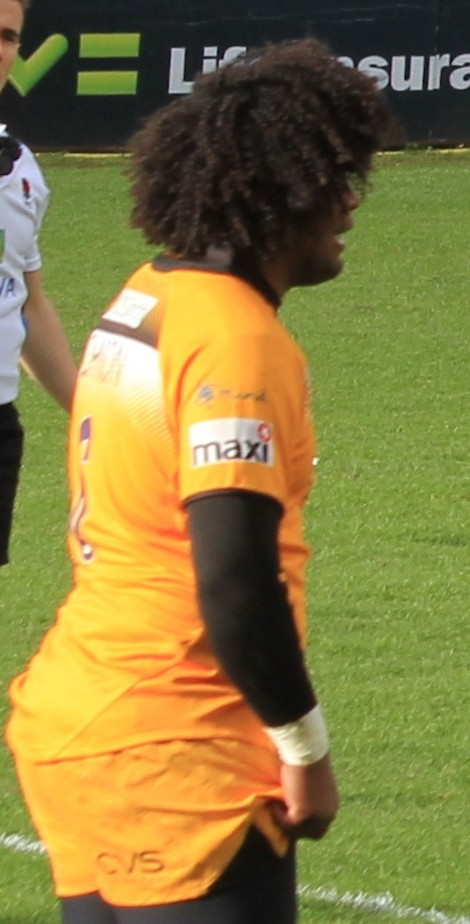
- Born: Ashley Francois Johnson; 16 May 1986 (age 40) Wynberg, South Africa
- Height: 1.83 m (6 ft 0 in)
- Weight: 112 kg (247 lb; 17 st 9 lb)
- School: Paarl Gymnasium, South Africa
- Occupation: Professional rugby union footballer

Rugby union career
- Position: No.8 / Flanker / hooker
Senior career
Years	Team	Apps	(Points)
2012–2020	Wasps	198	(210)
2020—	Birmingham Moseley		
- Correct as of 1 July 2020
Provincial / State sides
Years	Team	Apps	(Points)
2007–2012	Free State Cheetahs	63	(95)
Super Rugby
Years	Team	Apps	(Points)
2010–2012	Cheetahs	35	(30)
International career
Years	Team	Apps	(Points)
2009–2012	South Africa	3	(0)

Ashley Johnson (born 16 May 1986) is a professional rugby union player-coach who plays and coaches for Birmingham Moseley in National League 1. He previously played for Free State Cheetahs at provincial level, Cheetahs in the Super Rugby, Wasps in Premiership Rugby and the Springboks. His usual position is hooker, having converted from backrow whilst with Wasps. His first game for the Springboks was in 2009 on tour to the British Isles, but he only earned his first Test Caps in the 2011 Tri-Nations series.

== Career ==
Ashley Johnson is the son of Archie Johnson, who played Tight-Head Prop for the Western Province League and the SA Federation team (SA Proteas) in the 80s. Ashley followed in his father's footsteps and started out in the Prop position at school level, before moving to the no8 position.

At an early age Ashley was scouted and received a Nike Bursary, from where he continued his schooling at Paarl Gim. He eventually captained the Paarl Gim 1st team. and a Western Province schools team.

In 2006 Ashley joined the Free State Cheetahs. Between 2008 and 2009 he was loaned to the Griffons Rugby team for short stints, as Free State Cheetahs coach Naka Drotské planned to give Ashley more game time. It was also during this time that Naka Drotské experimented by playing Ashley at Hooker (No. 2) position, but due to injury problems in the loose forwards Ashley Johnson was recalled and had his first true chance to shine at No.8 where he excelled. This earned him his first call-up for the Springboks (South African International Rugby Union Team) in the November 2009 tour to the British Isles.

On 11 April 2012, Johnson signed for English side Wasps in the Aviva Premiership for the 2012/13 season.

On 20 April 2018 it was revealed that Johnson had tested positive for a "prohibited substance" in an out of competition drugs test on 7 February 2018 and was suspended until further notice. It was later revealed that hydrochlorothiazide was found in his urine – according to Johnson this was due to consuming his wife's dietary supplement – and the RFU ruled that this was due to carelessness, imposing a six-month ban on Johnson, allowing him to return to rugby duties on 7 August 2018.

He departed Wasps in June 2020 to become a player-coach at Birmingham Moseley.

== Squads ==
Ashley Johnson participated in the following rugby union squads:

- 2012 Wasps – Aviva Premiership
- 2011
  - Cheetahs – Super Rugby
  - Free State Cheetahs – Currie Cup Premier Division
  - Springboks – Tri-Nations
- 2010
  - Cheetahs – Super 14
  - Free State Cheetahs – Vodacom Cup
  - Free State Cheetahs – Currie Cup Premier Division
- 2009
  - Free State Cheetahs – Vodacom Cup
  - Griffons – Currie Cup First Division
  - Free State Cheetahs – Currie Cup Premier Division
  - Springboks – International Outgoing Tour
- 2008
  - Free State Cheetahs – Vodacom Cup
  - Griffons – Currie Cup First Division
  - Free State Cheetahs – Currie Cup Premier Division
  - Emerging Springboks – IRB Nations Cup
- 2007
  - Free State Cheetahs U21
  - Free State Cheetahs – Vodacom Cup
  - Free State Cheetahs – Currie Cup Premier Division
- 2006
  - Free State Cheetahs U21
  - Free State Cheetahs Sevens
  - South Africa – U21 World Championship
- 2004
  - Western Province – U18 Coca-Cola Craven Week
- 2003
  - Western Province – U18 Academy
  - South Africa U18
- 2002
  - Western Province (Captain)
- 2001
  - Boland, Stomers & Nike (Captain) U15
- 1999
  - Western Province – Craven Week
- 1998
  - Western Province – Nike U12 & U13 Craven Week
