= Ben White (rugby union, born 1983) =

Australian rugby union player (born 1983)

- Born: Ben White; 23 November 1983 (age 42) Gosford, NSW, Australia
- Height: 1.93 m (6 ft 4 in)
- Weight: 106 kg (234 lb)
- School: St. Edmunds College

Rugby union career
Senior career
Years	Team	Apps	(Points)
2005-2006	ACT Brumbies		
2006-2011	Cardiff Blues	50	(30)
2011-2020	Exeter Chiefs	113	(10)
2020-2020	Beddau Chuckles		

Ben White (born 23 November 1983 in Australia) is a rugby union player for Exeter Chiefs in the Aviva Premiership His preferred position is in the back row. He made his debut for Exeter Chiefs against Leicester Tigers on 3 September 2011.

White joined Exeter Chiefs from the Cardiff Blues in the Summer of 2011 having previously played for ACT Brumbies as well as the Brumby Runners and Canberra Vikings. White was a member of the 2006 Super 14 Rugby Squad with the Brumbies.
