= David Mélé =

French rugby union player and coach (born 1985)

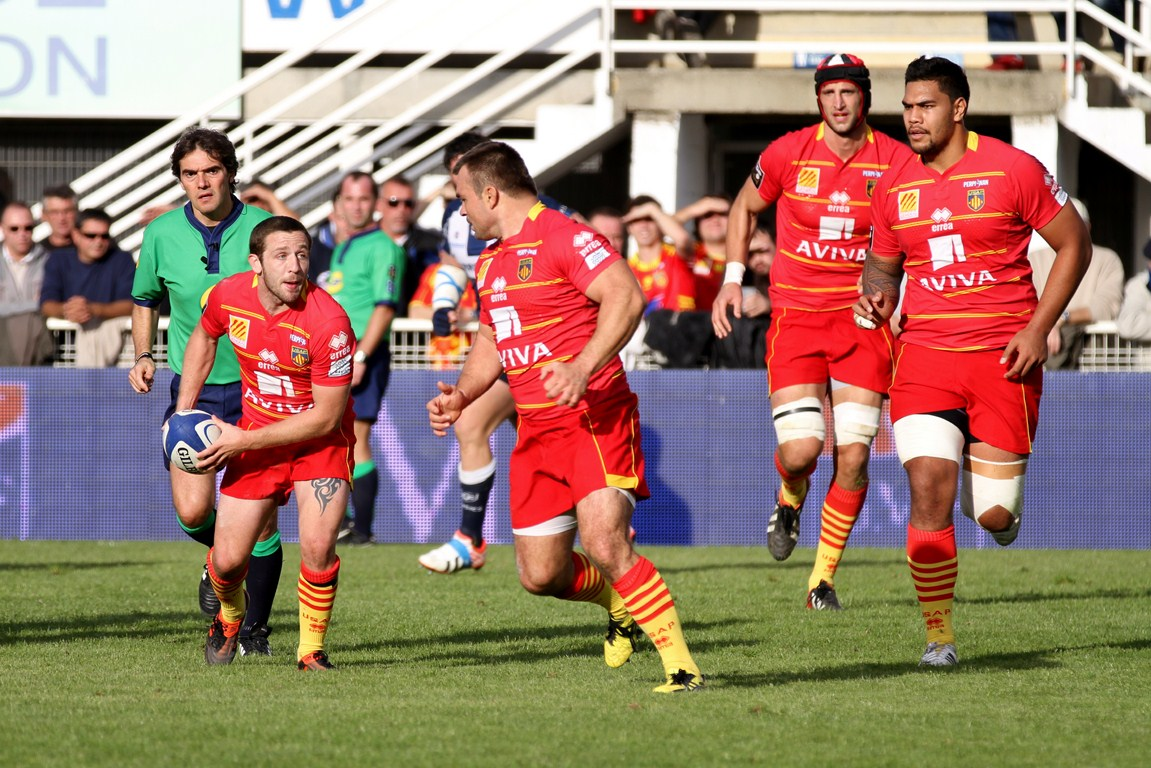
- Born: 22 October 1985 (age 41) Narbonne, France
- Height: 1.71 m (5 ft 7 1/2 in)
- Weight: 77 kg (12 st 2 lb)

Rugby union career
- Position: Scrum-half
Senior career
| Years | Team | Apps | (Points) |
| 2006–2013 | Perpignan | 138 | (231) |
| 2013–2015 | Leicester | 43 | (59) |
| 2015–2016 | Toulouse | 11 | (28) |
| 2016–2018 | Grenoble | 51 | (249) |
| 2018–2019 | Perpignan | 19 | (10) |
| 2006–2019 | Total | 262 | (577) |
- Correct as of 25 May 2019
International career
| Years | Team | Apps | (Points) |
| 2019 | Spain | 4 | (30) |
- Correct as of 22 June 2019
Coaching career
- Years: Team
- 2019-2020: Leicester Tigers

David Mélé (born 22 October 1985) is a rugby union coach most recently for Stade Toulousain. He was previously a professional player for Perpignan in two spells; Leicester, Toulouse and Grenoble; and represented Spain internationally. His primary position was scrum-half but also regularly featured at fly half.

== Career ==
Born in Narbonne, France, Mélé started his career with Perpignan in 2006. He won the French Top 14 Championship with them in 2009. In 2013 he joined Leicester Tigers in England's Premiership Rugby for two seasons before returning to France to play for Stade Toulousain. In 2018 he returned to Perpignan for a second spell after also playing for Grenoble.

He made his Spain debut on 10 March 2019 against Belgium, and went on to win four caps for Spain.

In July 2019 he rejoined Leicester Tigers as an academy coach and also helps train the club's half-backs.
