= Ignacio Mieres =

Argentine rugby union player (born 1987)

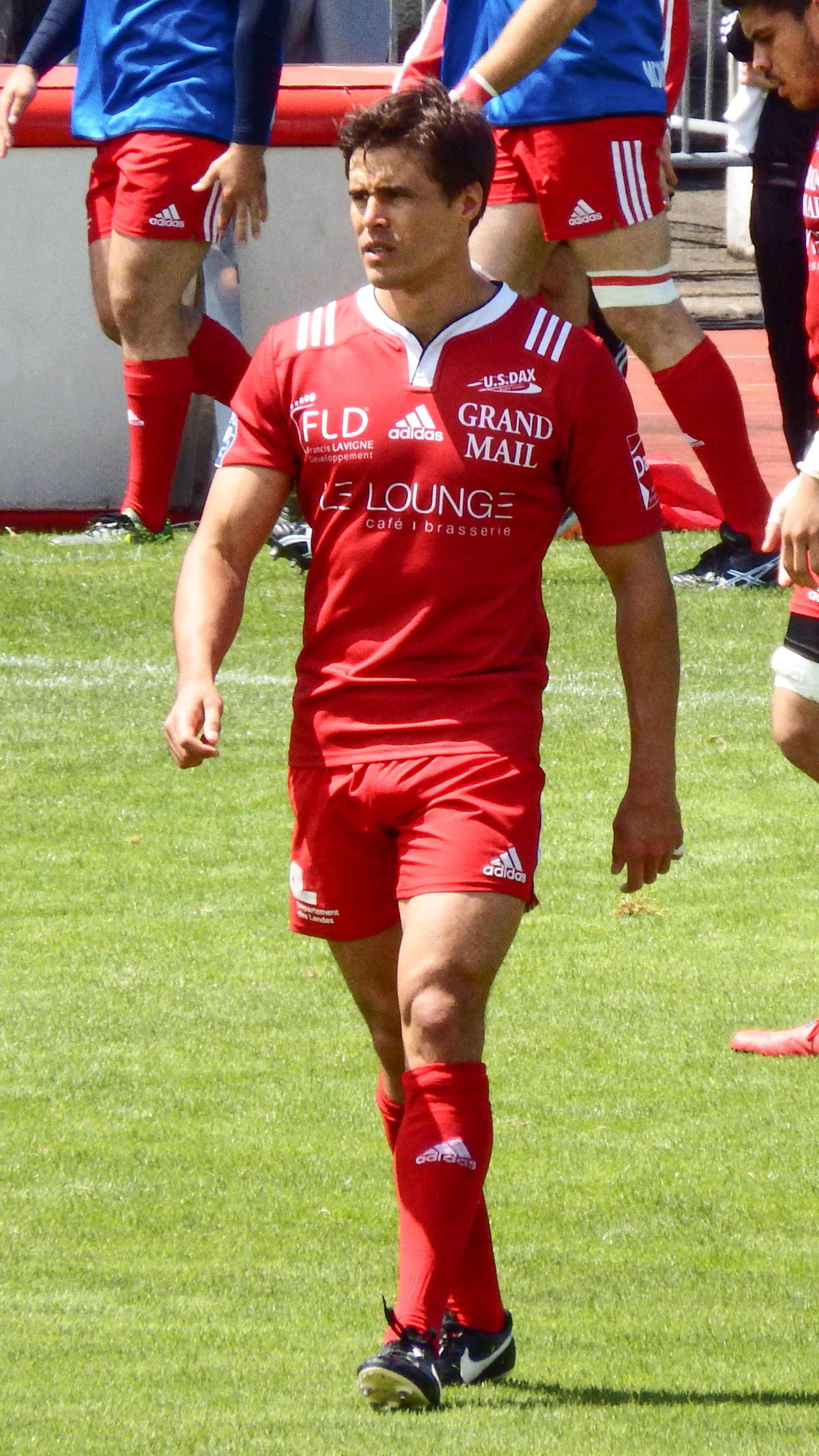
- Born: Ignacio Mieres; April 6, 1987 (age 39) Buenos Aires, Argentina
- Height: 1.89 m (6 ft 2 1/2 in)
- Weight: 92 kg (14 st 7 lb)

Rugby union career
- Position(s): Fly-half, Centre, Fullback
Senior career
Years	Team	Apps	(Points)
2008	Leicester Tigers		
2008	Stade Français Paris	0	(0)
2009	USA Perpignan	2	(0)
2009–10	Stade Français Paris	12	(14)
2010–13	Exeter Chiefs	40	(292)
2013–2015	Worcester Warriors	34	(158)
2015-2017	US Dax	34	(241)
2017-2018	SU Agen	10	(15)
International career
Years	Team	Apps	(Points)
2008–	Argentina Jaguars	7	(6)
2009–	Argentina	6	(32)

Ignacio Mieres (born April 6, 1987, in Buenos Aires) is an Argentine rugby union player. He previously played for Worcester Warriors in the RFU Championship

Mieres was signed on trials for Leicester Tigers in March 2008. After only being able to play sevens for the Tigers, Loffreda got sacked from Leicester and Mieres decided to move forward. It was then when he decided to move to Stade Français Paris, where he wasn't able to play because of his Argentinean passport, and Stade Français Paris already having two foreign players, Roncero and Gasnier.

Mieres joined Perpignan as back-up for Dan Carter and spent 4 months there. The next season, he returned to Stade Français Paris, where he played 10 matches in the Top 14 and Heineken Cup. When the season finished, Mieres was released and went back to Argentina, where he played for the Pampas for a couple of months before moving to Exeter Chiefs. He started his career at Exeter as the third choice fly-half, and after waiting a couple of months, he started the last two games of the Premiership scoring 25 points. For 2011/2012 Mieres was picked as the first-choice number 10 for the Chiefs scoring over 270 points across Premiership and Amlin Challenge Cup matches. After having an outstanding season, qualifying for Heineken Cup and being picked as the player of the season, he signed a two-year contract with Exeter, and is waiting for his chance in the Argentina "Pumas" team.

It was announced on 6 February 2013 that at the conclusion of the season Mieres will be joining Worcester Warriors.

He kicks post, and is able to play at fly-half, centre or full back.
