= Andrew Small (rugby union) =

New Zealand professional rugby union referee

- Born: Andrew Small; 9 July 1974 (age 52) Ashburton, New Zealand
- Occupation: Rugby union referee

Rugby union career
Amateur team(s)
Years	Team	Apps	(Points)
1983-91	Tinwald RFC		
1992	Collegiate RFC		
Refereeing career
Years	Competition		Apps
2006-	Premiership Rugby		
2007	1872 Cup		

Andrew Small (born 9 July 1974) is a professional rugby union referee who represents the English Rugby Union.

== Rugby union career ==
=== Playing career ===
==== Amateur career ====
Small played for the Ashburton clubs Tinwald RFC and Collegiate RFC.

=== Referee career ===
==== Professional career ====
Small joined the Otago Referees Association in 1993. He moved to England in 2002. He made his English Premiership debut in 2006. He refereed the very first 1872 Cup match on 28 December 2007.
