= Charlie Mulchrone =

English rugby union footballer

- Born: Charlie Mulchrone; 14 May 1989 (age 37) Manchester, England
- Height: 1.80 m (5 ft 11 in)
- Weight: 86 kg (13 st 8 lb)
- School: St. Ambrose College
- Notable relative(s): Fergus Mulchrone, (brother)

Rugby union career
- Position: Scrum-half
Amateur team(s)
Years	Team	Apps	(Points)
- Wilmslow RUFC
–	Macclesfield RUFC		
Senior career
Years	Team	Apps	(Points)
2012–2014	Rotherham Titans	38	(60)
2014–2016	Worcester Warriors	42	(45)
2016–	Harlequins	27	(20)
- Correct as of 30 November 2018
International career
Years	Team	Apps	(Points)
- England Counties
- Correct as of 19 February 2016

Charlie Mulchrone (born 14 May 1989) is an English rugby union player currently playing for Harlequins in the Gallagher Premiership.

He was educated at St. Ambrose College. He first joined Rotherham Titans in the RFU Championship from Macclesfield RFC during the 2012–13 season. On 4 February 2014, he signed for Worcester Warriors from the 2014–15 season. On 5 April 2016, Mulchrone agrees a deal to join Premiership rivals Harlequins from the 2016–17 season.

On 3 November 2017, Charlie Mulchrone was named as vice-captain in the first fifteen to face Saracens in the Anglo Welsh Cup. With most of Harlequins first team regulars being rested.
