= David Strettle =

England international rugby union player

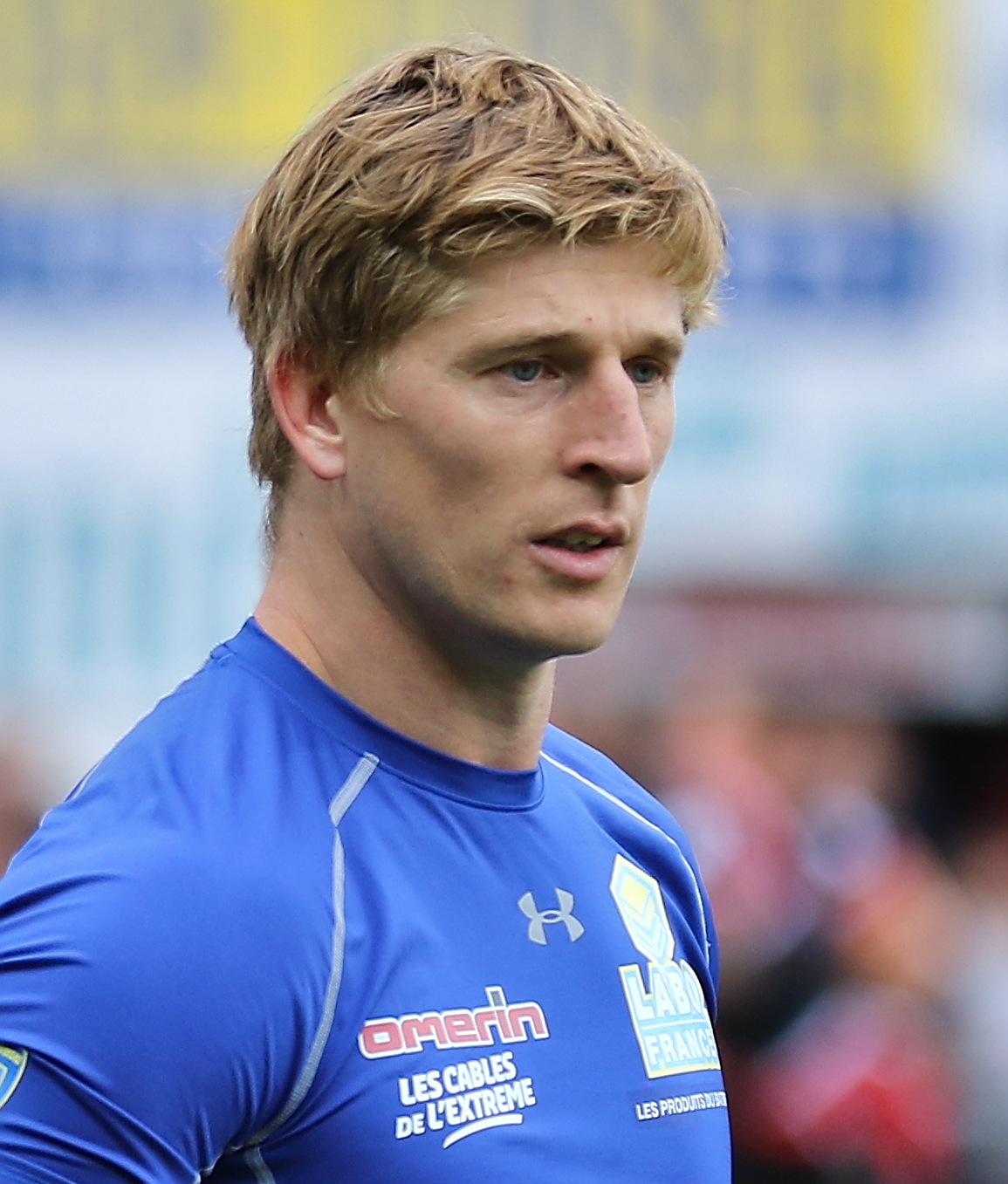
- Strettle in 2015
- Born: David Strettle; 23 July 1983 (age 43) Lymm, Cheshire, England
- Height: 1.83 m (6 ft 0 in)
- Weight: 78 kg (12 st 4 lb; 172 lb)
- School: Lymm High School
- University: Sheffield Hallam University

Rugby union career
- Position: Centre/Wing
Youth career
- -: Lymm
- –: Warrington
Senior career
Years	Team	Apps	(Points)
2002–2006	Rotherham Titans	43	(135)
2006–2010	Harlequins	81	(90)
2010–2015	Saracens	127	(205)
2015–2018	Clermont Auvergne	52	(100)
2018–2019	Saracens	19	(30)
- Correct as of 9 December 2019
International career
Years	Team	Apps	(Points)
2007–2013	England	14	(10)
National sevens team
Years	Team		Comps
- England

David Strettle (born 23 July 1983) is a former English rugby union wing.

== Early life ==
Strettle grew up in Thelwall, Cheshire, attending Lymm High School and playing for Lymm RFC. Strettle then went on to study at Sheffield Hallam University.

== Career ==
In the summer of 2006, Strettle joined the Harlequins from Rotherham, and made his club debut in the pre-season friendly against ASM Clermont on 6 August of that year.

As a teenager, he was a talented footballer, appearing on the books of Liverpool FC, Manchester City and Crewe Alexandra. He was also a keen rugby league fan.

Strettle scored a hat trick on his Rotherham debut against Rugby Lions and made his Premiership debut for the Titans against Bath in October 2003. He was Rotherham's top try-scorer in National One in the 2004–05 season scoring 18 tries in 22 appearances.

Strettle was known as "Ducks" at Harlequins after David Duckham, a player with whom Strettle has drawn comparison, and was touted as a future England winger. He scored a hat trick in the game against Newcastle Falcons and was included in the England Saxons squad for the team's games against Italy and Ireland, scoring in both games.

Strettle was also a regular in the England sevens squad throughout the 2005/06 IRB World Seven Series. He won a surprise call up to the England starting XV for its 2007 Six Nations game against Ireland at Croke Park in the place of the injured Jason Robinson, and scored England's only try in the 43–13 defeat on his debut. He also started in the win over France and the defeat to Wales.

On 2 May 2007, Strettle was named as the Professional Rugby Player's Association Young Player of the Season. He was also named in the Sky Sports Dream Team for the Guinness Premiership season 2006–07, along with fellow Harlequin and England hopeful Mike Brown. Also in May 2007, Strettle was named in the England Rugby squad to tour South Africa. Unfortunately, he came down with food poisoning along with other members of the squad, which prevented him from starting in England's 58–10 record defeat to South Africa.

On 16 August 2007, a confusing article appeared on Harlequins official site. It seemed to suggest that Strettle had crossed codes and signed for Harlequins RL. The basis of the story was that he was also a registered Harlequins Rugby League club player, as many players in Harlequins Rugby Union side were.

He returned to play for Harlequins after recovering from the injury that put him out of the 2007 Rugby World Cup and was called up to the England squad for the 2008 Six Nations Championship. He started the game against Wales but was withdrawn early on following a metatarsal break, which ruled him out of the rest of the tournament.

It was announced on 25 March 2010 that he would be playing rugby for Saracens from the start of 2010–11 season. During his time at Saracens he won two Premiership titles in 2011 and 2015. Strettle started both finals.

Strettle stayed with Saracens for a further four seasons, scoring 49 tries, until it was announced he would be playing for the French side Clermont Auvergne, beginning from the 2015-16 Top 14 season.

On 25 January 2018, Strettle re-signed with Saracens on a one-year contract, from the 2018–19 season. Upon his return to Saracens he helped them win the 2018–19 European Rugby Champions Cup, in the final of which he was a replacement. He was also a replacement as Saracens won the 2019 Premiership final.

== Personal life ==
Strettle is an aficionado of Football Manager, and sees himself as having the knack for "picking up players on the cheap and turning them into the new Rooney or Henry". This was an idea he floated to the Saracens coaching staff after a serious injury to flyhalf Derick Hougaard and resulted in Venter bringing in Owen Farrell at 10. He recently boasted of his ability to turn West Ham into a top European team within 2 to 3 seasons, while also stating that he was a "world class football manager".

Strettle's England teammates gave Strettle a new nickname during the 2007 Six Nations Championship. During training sessions, fellow players called him 'The Milkman' as he was known to always deliver a great performance during matches. This was revealed in a post-match interview after England's loss to Ireland.

== International tries ==
Try	Opposing team	Location	Venue	Competition	Date	Result	Score
1	Ireland	Dublin, Ireland	Croke Park	2007 Six Nations Championship	24 February 2007	Loss	43 – 13
2	Argentina	Salta, Argentina	Estadio Padre Ernesto Martearena	Summer International	8 June 2013	Win	32-3
