= Damian Welch =

Welsh rugby union player

Damien Welch
- Born: Damien Welch; 28 July 1982 (age 44) Reading, England
- Height: 198 cm (6 ft 6 in)
- Weight: 120 kg (18 st 13 lb; 265 lb)
- School: Little Heath School
- University: Cardiff University

Rugby union career
- Position: Lock
- Current team: Cardiff Blues
Senior career
Years	Team	Apps	(Points)
2006–07	Pontypridd RFC		
2007–09	Cardiff RFC	49	(60)
2009–10	Llanelli RFC	8	(0)
2009–11	Carmarthen Quins	2	(0)
2010–12	Llandovery RFC	14	(15)
2012–17	Exeter Chiefs	48	(40)
2019–2020	Merthyr RFC		
- Correct as of 14 March 2016
Provincial / State sides
Years	Team	Apps	(Points)
2006–09	Cardiff Blues	0	(0)
2009–12	Scarlets	60	(10)
2017–19	Cardiff Blues		
- Correct as of 14 March 2016
Coaching career
- Years: Team
- 2020–22: Plymouth Albion

Damian Welch (born 28 July 1982 in Reading) is a former Welsh Rugby Union player who played at lock. He represented Wales at Sevens in the 2008–2009 season.

== Club career ==
Welch played for Westwood Wanderers until the age of 16. After beginning his rugby career at Cardiff University he then went to represent Pontypridd RFC, Cross Keys RFC, Merthyr RFC Cardiff and Cardiff Blues and the Scarlets.

He joined the Exeter Chiefs in 2012.
