= Semisi Taulava =

Tongan rugby union player

- Born: Semisi Taulava; 26 February 1983 (age 43) Tonga
- Height: 1.96 m (6 ft 5 in)
- Weight: 128 kg (282 lb; 20.2 st)

Rugby union career
- Position(s): Number Eight, Lock, Flanker
Senior career
Years	Team	Apps	(Points)
- Wanganui
- Taranaki
2009–2010	Worthing	15	(25)
2010–2011	Pertemp Bees	23	(25)
2011–2012	Rotherham Titans	24	(30)
2012–2014	Worcester Warriors	28	(20)
2014-	Newcastle Falcons		
International career
Years	Team	Apps	(Points)
- Tonga Schools
–	Tonga U19		
–	Tonga U21		

Semisi Taulava (born 26 February 1983) is a Tongan rugby union player for Worcester Warriors in the Aviva Premiership.

He plays as a number eight or lock.

Taulava has previously played at Wanganui, Taranaki, Worthing and at Birmingham & Solihull before his year at Titans.

In 2012 he declared his availability to play for England.

In 2014 a transfer to Newcastle Falcons fell through after he failed a medical.
