= Fergus Mulchrone =

English rugby union footballer

- Born: 23 December 1986 (age 39)
- School: St Ambrose College
- University: Manchester Metropolitan University
- Notable relative: Charlie Mulchrone (brother)

Rugby union career
Senior career
Years	Team	Apps	(Points)
2011-2012	Sale Sharks		
2012-2013	Rotherham Rugby		
2013-2019	London Irish		

Fergus Mulchrone (born 23 December 1986) is an English rugby union player.

== Early life ==
He was educated at St Ambrose College, after which he took a gap year, then attended Manchester Metropolitan University to complete a marketing degree. The first time that he played against his brother, Charlie Mulchrone, was at the annual First Team vs Old Boys rugby game.

== Club career ==
After leaving St Ambrose, Fergus joined Macclesfield Rugby Club. From there he was recruited to Sale Sharks, where he played his first Premiership rugby. It has been reported that Fergus attended the Sale Sharks academy. Finding his opportunities at Sale limited, Fergus returned to Macclesfield. After playing a few games there, he moved to Championship side Rotherham Titans. In the April 2013 it was announced that Fergus would join London Irish as a Premiership player. In 2014 he signed a two year extension to his contract. In November 2017 he captained the team for the first time. In December 2017, he was announced as London Irish player of the month. In 2019 he moved to play National League 1 rugby with Sale F.C.

== Personal life ==
In May 2019, Fergus stated his plan to get married in the summer of 2019.
