= Dean Ryan =

England international rugby union player

- Born: Dean Ryan; 22 June 1966 (age 60) Tuxford, Nottinghamshire, England
- Height: 6 ft 6 in (1.98 m)
- Weight: 17 st 0 lb (108 kg)

Rugby union career
- Position: Number 8
Senior career
Years	Team	Apps	(Points)
1989–1995	Saracens	56	(54)
1995–1997	London Wasps		
1997–1998	Newcastle Falcons	30	(20)
1998–2000	Bristol Rugby	28	(15)
International career
Years	Team	Apps	(Points)
1990–1998	England	6	
Coaching career
- Years: Team
- 2000–2002: Bristol Rugby
- 2002–2005: Gloucester (asst coach)
- 2005–2009: Gloucester (head coach)
- 2012–2013: Scotland (asst coach)
- 2013–2016: Worcester Warriors
- 2014: Barbarians
- 2019-2022: Dragons
- Correct as of 30 June 2016

Dean Ryan (born 22 June 1966) is an English rugby union coach and former player. A former corporal in the Corp of Royal Engineers, he played for England as a Number 8. Since summer 2019 he has been head coach at the Welsh regional side, the Dragons, and was previously head coach or Director of Rugby at Guinness Premiership sides Gloucester Rugby and Worcester Warriors.

== Playing career ==
During his on-field career Ryan played for Saracens, Wasps, Newcastle and Bristol. Regarded as one of the most competitive and robust forwards of his generation he saw league success twice during his career with Wasps (96–97), and captained Newcastle to league success on the first attempt during the 97–98 season, making 21 appearances. He was awarded six England caps during his career with his International debut against Argentina in 1990.

== Coaching career ==
Ryan moved to coaching Bristol taking the reins at the club for the beginning of the 2000–01 season. In his first season Bristol finished 9th. He took the club to the Zurich Championship Final in 2002, where they lost to Gloucester Rugby, having finished 8th. Ryan moved to Gloucester Rugby after this as assistant head coach under Nigel Melville. Following Melville's departure from Gloucester Rugby in 2005 Ryan was appointed to the head coach role, which he held through the 2008–09 season.

During his time at Gloucester Rugby, Ryan assembled a team featuring a number of highly talented youngster and has put together a back-line considered by many to be one of the most exciting in English club rugby. Following the dismissal of Andy Robinson as England head coach in 2006, Dean Ryan was amongst the favourites to be his successor. However, Ryan stated that he was committed to his role at Gloucester Rugby and had not considered leaving as he believed that he had not yet finished his work at the club. Under Ryan's guidance Gloucester Rugby enjoyed three successful seasons. In his first two-season they finished 5th and 1st in the table and began the 2007–08 campaign as favourites, which ultimately they failed to live up to. Despite finishing 1st again they lost at home to Leicester in the play-off semi final. The following season they finished 6th.

Despite winning the 2006 European Challenge Cup, defeating London Irish in a tense final, Ryan failed to deliver the anticipated silverware at Gloucester, losing the 2007 Guinness Premiership final and the 2009 EDF Energy Cup final. A few Gloucester fans credit this lack of success to poor tactics; others, however, attribute the lack of success to disruptive influences. On 11 June 2009, Gloucester announced that Ryan had left the club by mutual consent.

In July 2012 Ryan returned to Bristol in a part-time consultancy role and in December 2012 he took on the role of rugby consultant for Newport Gwent Dragons, spending a day a week with each team. In January 2013 Ryan joined interim Scotland coach Scott Johnson as forward coach until the end of the 2013 Six Nations, where they finished third.

On 17 April 2013, Dean Ryan was appointed director of rugby at Worcester Warriors, replacing Richard Hill. Ryan couldn't keep the Warriors in the league in his first season in charge and the club was once again relegated to England's second tier. However, after releasing a number of older players the club began a rebuilding phase led by Ryan who recruited young talents unable to get game-time at big clubs. Warriors achieved promotion back to the Premiership at their first attempt, beating Bristol in the playoffs thanks to a last minute Chris Pennell try and Ryan Lamb conversion. The club also managed to win the B&I Cup defeating Doncaster 35–5. Warriors' first season back in the Aviva Premiership during the 2015/16 campaign was a successful one. The club made a number of high-profile signings in Francois Hougaard, Donncha O'Callaghan and Wynand Olivier and finished the season in 10th position. He decided to leave Worcester on 30 June 2016.

In August 2016 he joined the Rugby Football Union (RFU) as England's Head of International Player Development. His remit included working closely with academies and national-team coaches to share best practice and consistency from the Under 16 age group going through to the senior team. He also oversaw the development of elite coaches, including national-team coaches, and the identification of potential future international coaches. He left the RFU post in the summer of 2019 to take up the role of Director of Rugby with Dragons along with a position on the Dragons' board.

=== Other ===
Since 2012 he has been a regular rugby analyst for Sky Sports. On 30 May 2014 Dean coached the Barbarians to a 39–29 victory over an inexperienced England side.
