= 2013–14 European Challenge Cup pool stage =

2013–14 Amlin Challenge Cup pool stage
- Season: 2013–14 European Challenge Cup
- Date: 10 October 2013 – 19 January 2014

Qualifiers
- Seed 1: (England) Bath
- Seed 2: (England) London Wasps
- Seed 3: (France) Stade Français
- Seed 4: (England) Sale Sharks
- Seed 5: (England) Northampton Saints (from HC)
- Seed 6: (England) Harlequins (from HC)
- Seed 7: (England) Gloucester (from HC)
- Seed 8: (France) Brive

The 2013–14 Amlin Challenge Cup pool stage will be the opening stage of the 18th season of the European Challenge Cup, the second-tier competition for European rugby union clubs. The opening round of matches will be on 10–13 October 2013 and the closing round on 16–19 January 2014.

Twenty teams will participate in this phase of the competition; they are divided into five pools of four teams each, with each team playing the others home and away. Competition points are earned using the standard bonus point system. The pool winners advance to the knockout stage, where they will be joined by three entrants from the Heineken Cup pool stage. The quarter-finalists will then participate in a knockout tournament that ultimately ends with the final at the Arms Park in Cardiff on Friday 23 May 2014.

== Results ==
The draw for the pool stage took place on 5 June 2013 at the Aviva Stadium in Dublin. The dates and times of the first 4 rounds were announced on 27 July 2013. Lusitanos XV replaced Olympus Madrid on 2 September 2013, as the latter withdrew due to financial issues.

All times are local to the game location.

Key to colours
Winner of each pool advances to quarterfinals. Seed # in parentheses.

=== Pool 1 ===
Team	P	W	D	L	PF	PA	Diff	TF	TA	TB	LB	Pts
(England) Sale Sharks (4)	6	5	0	1	155	65	+90	18	7	2	1	23
(France) Biarritz Olympique	6	3	0	3	119	116	+3	16	12	2	2	16
(France) Oyonnax	6	2	1	3	86	142	−56	9	17	1	1	12
(England) Worcester Warriors	6	1	1	4	87	124	−37	9	16	0	1	7
Source : www.ercrugby.com Points breakdown: *4 points for a win *2 points for a draw *1 bonus point for a loss by seven points or less *1 bonus point for scoring four or more tries in a match

10 October 2013
19:45

Sale Sharks (England)	33–10	(France) Biarritz Olympique
Try: penalty try (2) 26' c, 73' c Ostrikov 49' c Con: Ford (2/2); Cipriani (1/1); Pen: Ford (3/3) 3', 20', 45'; Drop: Ford (1/1) 13'	Report	Try: van Staden 54' c Con: Peyrelongue (1/1); Pen: Peyrelongue (1/1) 10'

Salford City Stadium
Attendance: 3,153
Referee: Ian Davies (WRU)

12 October 2013
18:30

Oyonnax (France)	9–9	(England) Worcester Warriors
Pen: Barnard (3/4) 11', 62', 80'	Report	Pen: Warwick (3/3) 15', 29', 32'

Stade Charles-Mathon
Attendance: 6,125
Referee: Leo Colgan (IRFU)

19 October 2013
15:00

(1 BP) Biarritz Olympique (France)	26–6	(France) Oyonnax
Try: Furno 20' c Taele 40' c Burotu 64' c van Staden 76' m Con: Yachvili (3/3)	Report	Pen: Vuillemin (1/3) 23'; Bousquet (1/1) 42'

Parc des Sports Aguiléra
Attendance: 7,348
Referee: Luke Pearce (RFU)

19 October 2013
15:00

Worcester Warriors (England)	15–29	(England) Sale Sharks (1 BP)
Try: Grove 44' m Williams 53' c Con: Warwick (1/2); Pen: Warwick (1/1) 8'	Report	Try: Miller 17' c penalty try 30' c Peel 37' c Easter 59' m Con: Cipriani (3/4); Pen: Cipriani (1/3) 4'

Sixways Stadium
Attendance: 6,312
Referee: Andrew McMenemy (SRU)

5 December 2013
19:45

(1 BP) Worcester Warriors (England)	15–19	(France) Biarritz Olympique
Try: Hammond 24' m Grove 30' c Con: Pennell (1/2); Pen: Pennell (1/2) 71'	Report	Try: Ngwenya 35' c Lesgourgues 61' c Molcard 78' m Con: Peyrelongue (2/3)

Sixways Stadium
Attendance: 4,615
Referee: Dudley Phillips (IRFU)

5 December 2013
20:45

Oyonnax (France)	16–10	(England) Sale Sharks (1 BP)
Try: Figuerola 20' c Con: Urdapilleta (1/1); Pen: Urdapilleta (2/2) 2', 18'; Vuillemin (1/1) 74'	Report	Try: Mackenzie 12' c Con: Macleod (1/1); Drop: Ford (1/1) 80'

Stade Charles-Mathon
Attendance: 5,000
Referee: Giuseppe Vivarini (FIR)

12 December 2013
20:45

(1 BP) Biarritz Olympique (France)	33–25	(England) Worcester Warriors
Try: Lesgourgues (2) 4' c, 30' m Thomas (2) 59' c, 73' m Con: Peyrelongue (1/2); Baby (1/2); Pen: Lesgourgues (1/1) 41'; Baby (2/2) 57', 79'	Report	Try: Su'a 1' c Stelling 45' c Warwick 53' m Con: Mieres (1/2); Warwick (1/1); Pen: Mieres (2/4) 15', 21'

Parc des Sports Aguiléra
Attendance: 7,587
Referee: Neil Hennessy (WRU)

13 December 2013
20:00

(1 BP) Sale Sharks (England)	53–14	(France) Oyonnax
Try: Gaskell 24' c Cipriani (2) 31' c, 48' c Braid 35' c Cueto 38' c Miller 75' m Paterson 79' c Con: Cipriani (6/7); Pen: Cipriani (2/2) 9', 21'	Report	Try: Codjo 52' c Hansell-Pune 73' c Con: Vuillemin (1/1); Hansell-Pune (1/1)

Salford City Stadium
Attendance: 3,689
Referee: Neil Paterson (SRU)

10 January 2014
20:00

Sale Sharks (England)	21–3	(England) Worcester Warriors
Try: Peel 11' m Mills 43' m Tuitupou 59' m Pen: Cipriani (2/2) 9', 23'	Report	Pen: Warwick (1/1) 28'

Salford City Stadium
Attendance: 3,027
Referee: David Wilkinson (IRFU)

11 January 2014
15:30

(1 BP) Oyonnax (France)	28–24	(France) Biarritz Olympique (1 BP)
Try: Vuillemin 4' m Codjo 9' m Paea 30' m Hansell-Pune 41' c Con: Bousquet (1/4); Pen: Bousquet (2/2) 28', 55'	Report	Try: Burotu 16' c Pietersen 43' c Thomas 77' c Con: Peyrelongue (3/3); Pen: Peyrelongue (1/1) 6'

Stade Charles-Mathon
Attendance: 6,654
Referee: Andrew McMenemy (SRU)

18 January 2014
15:00

Worcester Warriors (England)	20–13	(France) Oyonnax (1 BP)
Try: penalty try 23' c Stelling 69' c Con: Mieres (2/2); Pen: Mieres (2/5) 64', 68'	Report	Try: Tebani 20' m Bousquet 72' m Pen: Bousquet (1/1) 9'

Sixways Stadium
Attendance: 6,180
Referee: Claudio Blessano (FIR)

18 January 2014
21:00

(1 BP) Biarritz Olympique (France)	7–9	(England) Sale Sharks
Try: Ngwenya 18' c Con: Peyrelongue (1/1)	Report	Pen: Miller (3/5) 21', 25', 78'

Parc des Sports Aguiléra
Attendance: 8,139
Referee: Marius Mitrea (FIR)

=== Pool 2 ===
Team	P	W	D	L	PF	PA	Diff	TF	TA	TB	LB	Pts
(England) Bath (1)	6	6	0	0	243	50	+193	34	4	4	0	28
(Wales) Newport Gwent Dragons	6	3	0	3	150	132	+18	17	13	2	0	14
(France) Bordeaux-Bègles	6	3	0	3	171	149	+22	21	17	2	0	14
(Italy) Mogliano	6	0	0	6	55	288	−233	5	43	0	0	0
Source : www.ercrugby.com Points breakdown: *4 points for a win *2 points for a draw *1 bonus point for a loss by seven points or less *1 bonus point for scoring four or more tries in a match

11 October 2013
19:15

(1 BP) Newport Gwent Dragons (Wales)	50–8	(Italy) Mogliano
Try: Wardle 7' c Chaparro 19' c J. Evans 22' c Harries (2) 31' c, 59' c I. Jones 64' m Hughes 74' c Con: Burton (6/7); Pen: Burton (1/1) 3'	Report	Try: Boni 71' m Pen: Fadalti (1/2) 28'

Rodney Parade
Attendance: 4,474
Referee: David Wilkinson (IRFU)

12 October 2013
21:00

Bordeaux–Bègles (France)	6–15	(England) Bath
Pen: Saubusse (2/2) 32', 73'	Report	Pen: Ford (5/6) 8', 27', 40', 51', 80'

Stade Chaban-Delmas
Attendance: 15,542
Referee: Neil Paterson (SRU)

19 October 2013
14:00

Mogliano (Italy)	20–32	(France) Bordeaux–Bègles (1 BP)
Try: Cornwell 42' c Boni 57' c Con: Fadalti (2/2); Pen: Fadalti (2/2) 19', 65'	Report	Try: Graham 23' c Lilomaiava 51' m penalty try 69' c Lonca 77' c Con: Sánchez (3/4); Pen: Sánchez (2/3) 15', 21'

Stadio Maurizio Quaggia
Attendance: 1,400
Referee: Vlad Iordescu (FRR)

19 October 2013
15:00

Bath (England)	26–10	(Wales) Newport Gwent Dragons
Try: Lane 5' c Gilbert 70' c Con: Heathcote (2/2); Pen: Heathcote (4/5) 27', 49', 58', 65'	Report	Try: Faletau 11' c Con: Tovey (1/1); Pen: Tovey (1/2) 32'

Recreation Ground
Attendance: 11,862
Referee: Giuseppe Vivarini (FIR)

6 December 2013
19:15

(1 BP) Newport Gwent Dragons (Wales)	40–24	(France) Bordeaux–Bègles
Try: Leach 6' c Pewtner 8' m Amos 29' c Faletau 57' c Smith 71' m Con: Tovey (3/4); Pen: Tovey (3/3) 39', 45', 64'	Report	Try: Poirot 35' c penalty try 55' c Lamotte 75' c Con: Saubusse (2/2); Lonca (1/1); Pen: Saubusse (1/2) 20'

Rodney Parade
Attendance: 4,023
Referee: Andrew McMenemy (SRU)

7 December 2013
14:00

Mogliano (Italy)	8–55	(England) Bath (1 BP)
Try: Ceccato 48' m Pen: Cornwell (1/1) 26'	Report	Try: Day (2) 5' c, 80' m Fearns 22' c Lane (3) 28' c, 34' m, 78' c Eastmond 52' m penalty try 66' c Biggs 75' m Con: Heathcote (5/9)

Stadio Maurizio Quaggia
Attendance: 2,000
Referee: Alexandre Ruiz (FFR)

12 December 2013
19:30

Bordeaux–Bègles (France)	32–13	(Wales) Newport Gwent Dragons
Try: Sánchez 7' c Lilomaiava 68' m Poirot 78' m Con: Sánchez (1/3); Pen: Sánchez (5/5) 4', 15', 22', 28', 43'	Report	Try: Faletau 35' c Con: Tovey (1/1); Pen: Tovey (2/2) 2', 26'

Stade André Moga
Attendance: 3,600
Referee: Marius Mitrea (FIR)

14 December 2013
15:00

(1 BP) Bath (England)	63–0	(Italy) Mogliano
Try: Fearns (2) 3' m, 45' c Banahan (4) 10' m, 41' c, 72' m, 75' m Garvey 16' m Ford 27' c penalty try 33' c Woodburn (2) 55' m, 59' m Con: Ford (4/7)	Report

Recreation Ground
Attendance: 11,598
Referee: Leo Colgan (IRFU)

10 January 2014
19:30

(1 BP) Bordeaux–Bègles (France)	64–7	(Italy) Mogliano
Try: penalty try 4' c Lacroix (2) 9' c, 42' c Tauleigne 15' c Gibouin 44' m Toetu 48' c Lilomaiava 55' m Brousse 58' c Tuculet (2) 67' c, 80' m Con: Serin (4/5); Lacroix (1/1); Saubusse (2/4)	Report	Try: Bacchin 70' c Con: Cornwell (1/1)

Stade André Moga
Attendance: 2,200
Referee: Ian Tempest (RFU)

11 January 2014
14:30

Newport Gwent Dragons (Wales)	13–30	(England) Bath (1 BP)
Try: Cudd 50' c Con: S. Jones (1/1); Pen: S. Jones (2/2) 25', 33'	Report	Try: Young 6' c Biggs 14' m Gilbert 26' c Houston 31' m Con: Heathcote (2/4); Pen: Heathcote (2/2) 9', 53'

Rodney Parade
Attendance: 6,063
Referee: Laurent Cardona (FFR)

16 January 2014
19:45

(1 BP) Bath (England)	54–13	(France) Bordeaux–Bègles
Try: Biggs 1' c Ford 32' c Perenise 36' c Joseph 45' c Day 49' c Rokoduguni (2) 57' c, 79' c Eastmond 60' m Con: Ford (6/7); Banahan (1/1)	Report	Try: Queheille 76' c Con: Bernard (1/1); Pen: Saubusse (2/2) 6', 8'

Recreation Ground
Attendance: 10,679
Referee: Peter Fitzgibbon (IRFU)

16 January 2014
20:45

Mogliano (Italy)	12–24	(Wales) Newport Gwent Dragons
Pen: Fadalti (4/5) 13', 21', 40', 62'	Report	Try: W. Evans 55' m Wardle 58' c Con: Burton (1/2); Pen: S. Jones (3/4) 25', 41', 51'; Burton (1/1) 73'

Stadio Maurizio Quaggia
Attendance: 1,000
Referee: Matthew Carley (RFU)

=== Pool 3 ===
Team	P	W	D	L	PF	PA	Diff	TF	TA	TB	LB	Pts
(France) Brive (8)	6	5	1	0	121	74	+47	11	6	1	0	23
(England) Newcastle Falcons	6	4	0	2	126	69	+57	15	5	1	2	19
(Romania) București Wolves	6	2	0	4	94	105	−11	6	7	0	2	10
(Italy) Calvisano	6	0	1	5	80	173	−93	6	20	0	0	2
Source : www.ercrugby.com Points breakdown: *4 points for a win *2 points for a draw *1 bonus point for a loss by seven points or less *1 bonus point for scoring four or more tries in a match

12 October 2013
15:00

(1 BP) București Wolves (Romania)	12–13	(England) Newcastle Falcons
Pen: Calafeteanu (4/4) 5', 7', 18', 25'	Report	Try: Powell 40' c Con: Hodgson (1/1); Pen: Hodgson (1/2) 2'; Catterick (1/1) 76'

Arcul de Triumf
Attendance: 1,100
Referee: Andrew McMenemy (SRU)

12 October 2013
19:30

Calvisano (Italy)	20–20	(France) Brive
Try: de Jager 28' c Visentin 64' c Con: Haimona (2/2); Pen: Haimona (2/6) 10', 39'	Report	Try: Pinet 32' c Lyons 76' c Con: Laranjeira (2/2); Pen: Laranjeira (2/3) 24', 51'

Peroni Stadium
Attendance: 2,000
Referee: Neil Hennessy (WRU)

19 October 2013
15:00

București Wolves (Romania)	37–15	(Italy) Calvisano
Try: Vlaicu 38' m Kinikinilau 68' c Popârlan 74' c Con: Vlaicu (2/3); Pen: Vlaicu (6/6) 12', 20', 25', 30', 44', 66'	Report	Pen: Haimona (5/7) 1', 9', 18', 24', 56'

Arcul de Triumf
Attendance: 1,100
Referee: Cédric Marchat (FFR)

19 October 2013
21:00

Brive (France)	23–16	(England) Newcastle Falcons (1 BP)
Try: Laranjeira 37' c Voretamaya 67' c Con: Laranjeira (2/2); Pen: Laranjeira (3/5) 6', 35', 59'	Report	Try: Lawson 22' m Shortland 44' m Pen: Godman (2/3) 50', 56'

Stade Amédée-Domenech
Attendance: 5,000
Referee: Dudley Phillips (IRFU)

7 December 2013
15:00

(1 BP) București Wolves (Romania)	13–18	(France) Brive
Try: Popârlan 57' c Con: Vlaicu (1/1); Pen: Vlaicu (2/3) 5', 20'	Report	Pen: Laranjeira (5/6) 23', 36', 65', 69', 80'; Drop: Ferrères (1/1) 7'

Arcul de Triumf
Attendance: 1,200
Referee: Neil Hennessy (WRU)

8 December 2013
15:00

(1 BP) Newcastle Falcons (England)	37–15	(Italy) Calvisano
Try: Kibirige 24' c Cato (2) 26' c, 66' m penalty try 45' c York 50' m Con: Clegg (3/4); Pen: Clegg (2/2) 10', 19'	Report	Try: Visentin 28' m Steyn 60' c Con: Haimona (1/2); Pen: Haimona (1/2) 14'

Kingston Park
Attendance: 2,889
Referee: Cédric Marchat (FFR)

12 December 2013
19:30

Brive (France)	20–9	(Romania) București Wolves
Try: Lebas 56' c Mafi 59' c Con: Laranjeira (2/2); Pen: Laranjeira (2/3) 6', 52'	Report	Pen: Vlaicu (3/3) 13', 22', 24'

Stade Amédée-Domenech
Attendance: 4,000
Referee: Giuseppe Vivarini (FIR)

14 December 2013
14:30

Calvisano (Italy)	10–25	(England) Newcastle Falcons
Try: Hehea 58' c Con: Haimona (1/1); Pen: Haimona (1/2) 5'	Report	Try: Kibirige (2) 3' c, 52' m Clegg 26' c Con: Godman (1/1); Clegg (1/2); Pen: Godman (1/1) 17'; Clegg (1/1) 39'

Peroni Stadium
Attendance: 1,400
Referee: Vlad Iordescu (FRR)

9 January 2014
19:45

(1 BP) Newcastle Falcons (England)	7–9	(France) Brive
Try: Penalty try 40' c Con: Hodgson (1/1)	Report	Pen: Laranjeira (3/5) 33', 43', 74'

Kingston Park
Attendance: 2,650
Referee: Ian Davies (WRU)

11 January 2014
14:30

Calvisano (Italy)	11–23	(Romania) București Wolves
Try: de Jager 10' m Pen: Griffen (2/2) 5', 28'	Report	Try: Van Heerden 20' c Lucaci 37' c Con: Vlaicu (2/2); Pen: Vlaicu (3/5) 17', 24', 40'

Peroni Stadium
Attendance: 1,500
Referee: Matthew Carley (RFU)

16 January 2014
19:30

Newcastle Falcons (England)	28–0	(Romania) București Wolves
Try: Shortland 2' m penalty try 38' c Catterick 74' c Con: Clegg (1/2); Godman (1/1); Pen: Clegg (3/3) 11', 20', 57'	Report

Kingston Park
Attendance: 2,511
Referee: Neil Paterson (SRU)

16 January 2014
20:30

(1 BP) Brive (France)	31–9	(Italy) Calvisano
Try: Mafi 2' m Hireche 21' c Sanchou 28' m Delage 51' c Maʻilei 59' c Con: Sola (3/5)	Report	Pen: Violi (3/3) 6', 25', 32'

Stade Amédée-Domenech
Attendance: 4,000
Referee: Ian Tempest (RFU)

=== Pool 4 ===
Team	P	W	D	L	PF	PA	Diff	TF	TA	TB	LB	Pts
(England) London Wasps (2)	6	6	0	0	285	76	+209	38	10	3	0	27
(France) Bayonne	6	3	0	3	219	118	+101	28	14	3	0	15
(France) Grenoble	6	2	1	3	118	158	−40	17	18	2	0	12
(Italy) Viadana	6	0	1	5	86	356	−270	13	54	0	0	2
Source : www.ercrugby.com Points breakdown: *4 points for a win *2 points for a draw *1 bonus point for a loss by seven points or less *1 bonus point for scoring four or more tries in a match

10 October 2013
20:45

(1 BP) Bayonne (France)	37–6	(France) Grenoble
Try: Arganese 11' c Gerber 35' c Ugalde 49' c Fonua 80' c Con: Bustos Moyano (3/3); Brett (1/1); Pen: Bustos Moyano (3/4) 4', 8', 34'	Report	Pen: Bézy (2/2) 6', 18'

Stade Jean Dauger
Attendance: 6,602
Referee: Marius Mitrea (FIR)

12 October 2013
15:00

Viadana (Italy)	17–90	(England) London Wasps (1 BP)
Try: Barbieri 40' c Fenner 76' c Con: Fenner (2/2); Pen: Fenner (1/1) 12'	Report	Try: Helu (3) 10' c, 31' c, 33' c penalty try 14' c Myall 17' c Thompson (3) 23' c, 42' m, 47' c T. Bell 28' c McIntyre 38' c Winter-Moates (2) 52' m, 59' c Hayter 68' m Simpson 80' m Con: Carlisle (10/14)

Stadio Luigi Zaffanella
Attendance: 3,000
Referee: Laurent Cardona (FFR)

17 October 2013
19:45

London Wasps (England)	26–10	(France) Bayonne
Try: Jackson 51' c Bassett 55' c Con: Goode (2/2); Pen: Goode (4/5) 16', 24', 44', 61'	Report	Try: Gerber 4' c Con: Brett (1/1); Pen: Brett (1/1) 31'

Adams Park
Attendance: 4,627
Referee: Peter Fitzgibbon (IRFU)

18 October 2013
19:30

(1 BP) Grenoble (France)	40–7	(Italy) Viadana
Try: Beal (2) 8' c, 32' c Michallet (2) 12' c, 20' c Kilioni (2) 28' m, 34' c Con: Bézy (5/6)	Report	Try: Yakopo 40' c Con: Apperley (1/1)

Stade Lesdiguières
Attendance: 5,940
Referee: Neil Hennessy (WRU)

6 December 2013
20:00

(1 BP) Bayonne (France)	63–7	(Italy) Viadana
Try: Bernad 10' c Rouet (2) 15' c, 48' c Gerber (2) 20' c, 36' c Ahotaeiloa (2) 24' c, 67' c Bustos Moyano 39' c Fuster 52' c Con: Brett (9/9)	Report	Try: penalty try 33' c Con: Fenner (1/1)

Stade Jean Dauger
Attendance: 2,022
Referee: Vlad Iordescu (FRR)

7 December 2013
21:00

Grenoble (France)	7–47	(England) London Wasps (1 BP)
Try: Beal 60' c Con: Barkley (1/1)	Report	Try: Helu 13' c Thompson (2) 21' c, 44' c Hayter (2) 54' m, 66' c Winter-Moates 74' c Bassett 77' c Con: Carlisle (3/4); T. Bell (3/3)

Stade Lesdiguières
Attendance: 6,800
Referee: Ian Davies (WRU)

14 December 2013
15:00

Viadana (Italy)	19–80	(France) Bayonne (1 BP)
Try: Padro 13' m Yakopo 19' c Amadasi 48' c Con: Sánchez (2/3)	Report	Try: Rouet 7' c Fuster 23' c Fonua 27' c Faʻaoso (2) 32' c, 63' c Roumieu (2) 35' m, 40' c Fernández 45' m Bustos Moyano (2) 49' c, 58' c Ugalde 68' c Rokocoko 75' c Con: Bustos Moyano (6/8); Bélie (4/4)

Stadio Luigi Zaffanella
Attendance: 875
Referee: Ian Tempest (RFU)

15 December 2013
15:00

London Wasps (England)	32–12	(France) Grenoble
Try: Haskell 20' c Varndell 66' c Con: Carlisle (2/2); Pen: Carlisle (5/6) 14', 19', 28', 62', 65'; Daly (1/1) 52'	Report	Try: Ratini (2) 44' c, 58' m Con: Bézy (1/2)

Adams Park
Attendance: 3,759
Referee: Andrew McMenemy (SRU)

11 January 2014
14:00

Viadana (Italy)	19–19	(France) Grenoble
Try: Robertson 3' m Amadasi 8' c Monfrino 80' c Con: Sánchez (1/2); Apperley (1/1)	Report	Try: Nicolas (2) 36' m, 67' c Michallet 59' c Con: Michallet (2/2)

Stadio Luigi Zaffanella
Attendance: 750
Referee: Leo Colgan (IRFU)

11 January 2014
21:00

Bayonne (France)	13–26	(England) London Wasps
Try: Chisholm 51' c Con: Bustos Moyano (1/1); Pen: Bustos Moyano (2/3) 5', 14'	Report	Try: Davies 39' m Launchbury 62' c Varndell 71' m Con: Carlisle (1/2); Pen: Goode (3/6) 2', 7', 29'

Stade Jean Dauger
Attendance: 4,746
Referee: Dudley Phillips (IRFU)

17 January 2014
19:30

(1 BP) Grenoble (France)	34–16	(France) Bayonne
Try: Roodt 20' m Alexandre 43' c Ratini 49' m Nicolas 56' c Campo 60' c Con: Hart (2/4); Caminati (1/1); Pen: Hart (1/1) 3'	Report	Try: Monribot 33' c Con: Brett (1/1); Pen: Brett (3/3) 28', 37', 54'

Stade Lesdiguières
Attendance: 6,190
Referee: Andrew McMenemy (SRU)

19 January 2014
14:00

(1 BP) London Wasps (England)	64–17	(Italy) Viadana
Try: Johnson 2' c Daly (3) 10' c, 15' c, 26' m Varndell (2) 34' m, 80' c Helu 64' c Simpson 68' m Vea 74' c Carlisle 79' c Con: Carlisle (7/10)	Report	Try: Sintich 12' m Monfrino 61' m Travagli 70' c Con: Sánchez (1/2)

Adams Park
Attendance: 3,029
Referee: Alexandre Ruiz (FFR)

=== Pool 5 ===
Team	P	W	D	L	PF	PA	Diff	TF	TA	TB	LB	Pts
(France) Stade Français (3)	6	5	0	1	202	75	+127	27	6	4	0	24
(England) London Irish	6	5	0	1	293	65	+228	41	6	4	0	24
(Italy) Cavalieri Prato	6	2	0	4	100	198	−98	12	28	2	1	11
(Portugal) Lusitanos XV	6	0	0	6	68	325	−257	8	48	0	0	0
Source : www.ercrugby.com Points breakdown: *4 points for a win *2 points for a draw *1 bonus point for a loss by seven points or less *1 bonus point for scoring four or more tries in a match

10 October 2013
20:45

(1 BP) Stade Français (France)	61–3	(Portugal) Lusitanos XV
Try: Cocagi 4' c Garrault 16' c Arias (2) 21' c, 49' c Porical (2) 31' c, 37' c van Zyl 41' m Rabadan 60' c Kingi 66' c Con: Porical (6/6); Lydon (1/2); Mallet (1/1)	Report	Pen: Cabral (1/2) 40'

Stade Jean-Bouin
Attendance: 6,314
Referee: Giuseppe Vivarini (FIR)

11 October 2013
20:00

(1 BP) London Irish (England)	60–11	(Italy) Cavalieri Prato
Try: Stevens 11' m Dorrian 17' c Fenby 26' m Tagicakibau 37' c Mulchrone (2) 45' c, 58' c Lewington 56' c Allinson 68' m Halavatau 80' c Con: Dorrian (5/8); Allinson (1/1); Pen: Dorrian (1/1) 5'	Report	Try: De Gregori 77' m Pen: Browne (2/2) 33', 50'

Madejski Stadium
Attendance: 5,326
Referee: Vlad Iordescu (FRR)

19 October 2013
14:00

(1 BP) Cavalieri Prato (Italy)	16–17	(France) Stade Français
Try: Souare 47' c Con: Browne (1/1); Pen: Browne (2/5) 25', 42'; Drop: Majstorovic (1/1) 63'	Report	Try: penalty try 58' c Garrault 78' c Con: Porical (2/2); Pen: Porical (1/1) 67'

Stadio Enrico Chersoni
Attendance: 1,500
Referee: David Wilkinson (IRFU)

19 October 2013
17:00

Lusitanos XV (Portugal)	6–67	(England) London Irish (1 BP)
Pen: Cabral (2/2) 8', 34'	Report	Try: Tagicakibau 22' c Cowan 36' c Yarde (2) 43' c, 66' m Stevens (2) 51' c, 57' c Lewington 61' c Treviranus 65' c Allinson 71' c Con: Dorrian (7/8); Allinson (1/1); Pen: Dorrian (2/2) 4', 13'

Estádio Universitário de Lisboa
Attendance: 1,500
Referee: Leo Colgan (IRFU)

7 December 2013
14:30

(1 BP) Cavalieri Prato (Italy)	40–22	(Portugal) Lusitanos XV
Try: penalty try 12' c Majstorovic 20' c Tempestini 32' m Vezzosi 40' c von Grumbkow 47' c Souare 64' c Con: Browne (5/6)	Report	Try: Cunha 18' c Fragoso Mendes (2) 69' m, 78' c Con: Covas (1/1); Penha e Costa (1/2); Pen: Covas (1/2) 6'

Stadio Enrico Chersoni
Attendance: 600
Referee: Matthew Carley (RFU)

8 December 2013
15:00

London Irish (England)	24–13	(France) Stade Français
Try: Fowlie 22' m Lewington 72' c Con: Geraghty (1/2); Pen: Geraghty (4/4) 2', 19', 39', 61'	Report	Try: Missoup 57' c Con: Porical (1/1); Pen: Porical (2/2) 5', 44'

Madejski Stadium
Attendance: 5,721
Referee: Neil Paterson (SRU)

12 December 2013
20:00

Lusitanos XV (Portugal)	19–30	(Italy) Cavalieri Prato (1 BP)
Try: Fragoso Mendes 24' c Foro 65' m Salgueiro 80' c Con: Penha e Costa (2/3)	Report	Try: penalty try 34' c Bernini (2) 40' m, 55' c Cicchinelli 45' m Con: Browne (2/4); Pen: Vezzosi (1/1) 10'; Browne (1/1) 22'

Estádio Universitário de Lisboa
Attendance: 500
Referee: Alexandre Ruiz (FFR)

14 December 2013
21:00

(1 BP) Stade Français (France)	32–14	(England) London Irish
Try: Plisson 12' c Van Vuuren 24' c Porical 49' c Burban 77' m Con: Porical (3/4); Pen: Porical (2/2) 20', 40'	Report	Try: Fenby 4' m Pen: Geraghty (3/5) 16', 27', 37'

Stade Jean-Bouin
Attendance: 10,250
Referee: Ian Davies (WRU)

9 January 2014
20:30

(1 BP) Stade Français (France)	31–3	(Italy) Cavalieri Prato
Try: Camara 25' c Frou 29' c Kingi 71' c van Zyl 77' c Con: Porical (4/4); Pen: Porical (1/1) 4'	Report	Pen: Falsaperla (1/1) 53'

Stade Jean-Bouin
Attendance: 5,939
Referee: Neil Hennessy (WRU)

11 January 2014
15:00

(1 BP) London Irish (England)	79–3	(Portugal) Lusitanos XV
Try: Armitage (2) 2' m, 76' c Fenby (3) 8' m, 14' c, 27' c penalty try 34' c Fowlie (2) 38' m, 79' m Sinclair 44' c Evans 47' c Low 50' m Danaher 55' m Homer 64' c Con: Geraghty (3/6); Dorrian (4/7)	Report	Pen: Leal (1/1) 7'

Madejski Stadium
Attendance: 4,714
Referee: Claudio Blessano (FIR)

16 January 2014
20:00

Lusitanos XV (Portugal)	15–48	(France) Stade Français (1 BP)
Try: Bettencourt 38' c Miranda 80' m Con: Penha e Costa (1/2); Pen: Penha e Costa (1/1) 23'	Report	Try: Nayacalevu 34' c Porical 42' m Zhvania 46' m penalty try 54' c Bonfils 57' c Kingi 59' c Burban 70' c Con: Porical (5/7); Pen: Porical (1/1) 14'

Estádio Universitário de Lisboa
Attendance: 350
Referee: Vlad Iordescu (FRR)

18 January 2014
14:30

Cavalieri Prato (Italy)	0–49	(England) London Irish (1 BP)
	Report	Try: Parr 1' c Danaher 18' c Fenby 21' c Cowan (2) 37' c, 45' c Evans 60' c Lewington 78' c Con: Geraghty (4/4); Dorrian (3/3)

Stadio Enrico Chersoni
Attendance: 1,000
Referee: Cedric Marchat (FFR)

== See also ==
- European Challenge Cup
- 2013–14 Heineken Cup
