= 2014–15 European Rugby Challenge Cup pool stage =

- Season: 2014–15 European Rugby Challenge Cup
- Date: 16 October 2014 – 25 January 2015

Qualifiers
- Seed 1: (England) Gloucester
- Seed 2: (England) Exeter Chiefs
- Seed 3: (Wales) Newport Gwent Dragons
- Seed 4: (England) London Irish
- Seed 5: (Scotland) Edinburgh
- Seed 6: (Wales) Cardiff Blues
- Seed 7: (England) Newcastle Falcons
- Seed 8: (Ireland) Connacht

The 2014–15 European Rugby Challenge Cup pool stage was the first stage of the inaugural season of the new European Rugby Challenge Cup format, which replaced the European Challenge Cup as the second-tier European competition for clubs.

It involved 20 teams competing, across 5 pools of 4 teams, for 8 quarter-final places – awarded to the 5 pool winners and the 3 top-ranked pool runners-up.

The pool stage began in October 2014, and was completed in January 2015.

== Seeding ==
The 20 teams were seeded through a new system based on a club's performance in their domestic league for previous season alone, whereas the previous tournament, the European Challenge Cup, seeded teams based on performance in European Competition over 4 previous seasons.

- English teams were seeded by performance in the 2013–14 Aviva Premiership. The winner of the 2013–14 RFU Championship play-offs is the final English seed.
- French teams were seeded by performance in the 2013–14 Top 14, promoted sides have been seeded based on their performance in the 2013–14 Pro D2
- Irish, Italian, Scottish and Welsh teams were seeded by performance in the 2013–14 Pro12.

Rank	Top 14	Premiership	Pro 12	Qualifying Competition
1	(France) Stade Français	(England) Exeter Chiefs	(Wales) Cardiff Blues	(Italy) Rovigo Delta
2	(France) Bordeaux Bègles	(England) Gloucester	(Scotland) Edinburgh	(Romania) București Wolves
3	(France) Brive	(England) London Irish	(Wales) Newport Gwent Dragons	
4	(France) Bayonne	(England) Newcastle Falcons	(Ireland) Connacht	
5	(France) Grenoble	(England) London Welsh	(Italy) Zebre	
6	(France) Oyonnax			
7	(France) Lyon			
8	(France) La Rochelle			

Teams were then placed into 4 Tiers, each containing 5 teams, based on their seeding. A draw determined which two second seeded teams completed Tier 1, and based on this, the fourth seeded teams were allocated to either Tier 2 and Tier 3.

Given the nature of the Qualifying Competition, a competition including developing rugby nations and Italian clubs not competing in the Pro12, Rugby Europe 1 and Rugby Europe 2 are automatically included in Tier 4, despite officially being ranked 1/2 from that competition.

The brackets show each teams seeding and their league (for example, 1 Top 14 indicates the team has been seeded 1st from the Top 14).

Tier 1	(Wales) Cardiff Blues (1 Pro12)	(England) Exeter Chiefs (1 AP)	(France) Stade Français (1 Top 14)	(England) Gloucester (2 AP)	(Scotland) Edinburgh (2 Pro12)
Tier 2	(France) Bordeaux Bègles (2 Top 14)	(France) Brive (3 Top 14)	(England) London Irish (3 AP)	(Wales) Newport Gwent Dragons (3 Pro12)	(France) Bayonne (4 Top 14)
Tier 3	(England) Newcastle Falcons (4 AP)	(Ireland) Connacht (4 Pro12)	(France) FC Grenoble (5 Top 14)	(England) London Welsh (5 AP)	(Italy) Zebre (5 Pro12)
Tier 4	(France) Oyonnax (6 Top 14)	(France) Lyon (7 Top 14)	(France) La Rochelle (8 Top 14)	(Italy) Rovigo Delta (Rugby Europe 1)	(Romania) București Wolves (Rugby Europe 2)

== Pool stage ==
The draw took place on 10 June 2014, at the Stade de la Maladière in Neuchâtel.

Teams will play each other twice, both at home and away, in the group stage, that will begin on the weekend of 16/17/18/19 October 2014, and continue through to 22/23/24/25 January 2015, before the pool winners and three best runners-up progress to the quarter finals.

The pool stage of the competition uses the same competition point system as previous European competitions, where, based on the result of the match, teams receive:

- 4 points for a win,
- 2 points for a draw,
- 1 attacking bonus point for scoring four or more tries in a match,
- 1 defensive bonus point for losing a match by seven points or less.

Based on these competition points, the five pool winners from each group, will progress to the quarter-finals, along with the three best pool runners-up from the competition. If at any point in the competition there is a tie between two or more teams from the same pool, the following criteria will be used as tie-breakers:

1. The club with the greater number of competition points from only matches involving tied teams.
2. If equal, the club that scored the most tries in those matches.
3. If equal, the club with the best aggregate points difference from those matches.

If this does not separate teams, and/or the tie relates to teams that haven't played each other (i.e. are in different pools), the following tie breakers are used:

1. The club that scored the most tries in the pool stage.
2. If equal, the club with the best aggregate points difference from the pool stage.
3. If equal, the club with the fewest players suspended in the pool stage.
4. If equal, the drawing of lots will determine a club's ranking.

Fixtures were announced on Thursday 14 August 2014 at 2 pm.

Key to colours
Winner of each pool, advance to quarter-finals.
Three highest-scoring second-place teams advance to quarter-finals.

=== Pool 1 ===
Pos	Team	Pld	W	D	L	PF	PA	PD	TF	TA	TB	LB	Pts
1	(England) London Irish (4)	6	5	0	1	220	123	+97	30	11	4	0	24
2	(Wales) Cardiff Blues (6)	6	5	0	1	249	95	+154	35	10	4	0	24
3	(France) Grenoble	6	2	0	4	161	160	+1	19	21	3	1	12
4	(Italy) Rovigo Delta	6	0	0	6	77	329	−252	8	50	0	1	1

Source: espn.co.uk

18 October 2014
14:30

(1 BP) Cardiff Blues (Wales)	37–14	(France) Grenoble
Try: Patchell 9' c L. Williams 12' m Warburton 42' c R. Smith 58' m Turnbull 73' c Con: Patchell (3/5) 10', 42', 73'; Pen: Patchell (2/4) 40', 55'	Report	Try: Marrou 77' m Pen: Hart (3/3) 25', 35', 50'

Cardiff Arms Park, Cardiff
Attendance: 6,267
Referee: Marius Mitrea (Italy)

19 October 2014
15:00

(1 BP) London Irish (England)	70–14	(Italy) Rovigo Delta
Try: Ojo (3) 4' c, 30' c, 37' c Dorrian 23' c Griffin 41' c Halavatau 54' c Low 58' c Guest 62' c Leo 74' c Short 76' c Con: Dorrian (10/10) 5', 24', 31', 39', 42', 55', 59', 63', 75', 77'	Report	Try: Mahoney 46' c De Marchi 79' c Con: Basson (1/1) 47'; Farolini (1/1) 80'

Madejski Stadium, Reading
Attendance: 4,219
Referee: Vlad Iordachescu (Romania)

25 October 2014
15:00

Rovigo Delta (Italy)	18–33	(Wales) Cardiff Blues (1 BP)
Try: Javier Rodriguez 9' c Montauriol 80' c Con: Farolini (1/2) 10'; Pen: Farolini (2/2) 40', 50'	Report	Try: Dacey 12' m Turnbull 24' c Jenkins 29' c Vosawai 61' c Cook 69' c Con: Patchell (4/5) 25', 30', 61', 69'

Stadio Mario Battaglini, Rovigo
Attendance: 1,750
Referee: Laurent Cardona (France)

24 October 2014
19:30

Grenoble (France)	15–25	(England) London Irish (1 BP)
Pen: Hart (5/5) 2', 10', 21', 44', 52'	Report	Try: Mulchrone 6' m Aulika 15' c Lewington 26' m Narraway 66' m Con: Geraghty (1/3) 16'; Pen: Noakes (1/2) 56'

Stade Lesdiguières, Grenoble
Attendance: 7,759
Referee: Peter Fitzgibbon (Ireland)

5 December 2014
19:30

(1 BP) Grenoble (France)	68–10	(Italy) Rovigo Delta
Try: Bouchet 4' c Penalty try 19' c Faure 25' c Thiery (2) 34' c, 40'c Ratini 35' c Caire 41' c Rey 45' m Jammes 71' c Mignot 74' c Con: Hart (6/7) 5', 20', 26', 35', 36', 40'; Michallet (2/2) 72', 75'	Report	Try: De Marchi 54' c Con: Farolini (1/1) 56'; Pen: Farolini (1/1) 8'

Stade Lesdiguières, Grenoble
Attendance: 7,800
Referee: David Wilkinson (Ireland)

6 December 2014
15:15

Cardiff Blues (Wales)	24–14	(England) London Irish
Try: Smith 10' c L. Williams 63' c Dacey 75' c Con: Anscombe (3/3) 11', 64', 76'; Pen: Anscombe (1/3) 47'	Report	Try: Cross 7' c Penalty try 79' c Con: Geraghty (2/2) 8', 80'

Cardiff Arms Park, Cardiff
Attendance: 5,430
Referee: Alexandre Ruiz (France)

13 December 2014
15:00

(1 BP) Rovigo Delta (Italy)	17–20	(France) Grenoble (1 BP)
Try: Caffini 56' m Pen: Farolini (4/5) 10', 22', 34', 39'	Report	Try: Bouchet (2) 26' m, 42' m Caire 47' m Farrell 62' m

Stadio Mario Battaglini, Rovigo
Attendance: 800
Referee: Lloyd Linton (Scotland)

13 December 2014
15:00

London Irish (England)	34–23	(Wales) Cardiff Blues
Try: Fenby (2) 32' c, 65' m Geraghty 47' c Con: Homer (2/3) 34', 48'; Pen: Homer (5/5) 5', 22', 28', 53', 69'	Report	Try: Allen 10' c Anscombe 70' c Con: Anscombe (2/2) 11', 71'; Pen: Anscombe (3/3) 36', 39', 65'

Madejski Stadium, Reading
Attendance: 5,838
Referee: Andrew McMenemy (Scotland)

16 January 2015
19:30

(1 BP) Cardiff Blues (Wales)	104–12	(Italy) Rovigo Delta
Try: L. Williams (2) 7' c, 44' c Turnbull 10' c R. Smith (3) 19' m, 24' c, 49' m Patchell 20' c Hobbs 34' c E. Jenkins (2) 37' c, 46' c Allen 40' c Cook 60' c Andrews 69' m Dacey 73' m G. Davies 78' c L. Jones 80' c Con: Anscombe (7/8) 8', 11', 21', 26', 36', 38', 40'; G. Davies (5/8) 45', 47', 61', 79', 80'	Report	Try: Maran 56' m Menon 66' c Con: Basson (1/2) 67'

Cardiff Arms Park, Cardiff
Attendance: 4,733
Referee: Ian Tempest (England)

17 January 2015
15:00

(1 BP) London Irish (England)	43–41	(France) Grenoble (2 BP)
Try: Lewington 3' m Penalty try 8' c Guest 40' m Cross 60' m Fenby 74' m Dorrian 76' c Con: Geraghty (1/3) 9'; Homer (1/3) 77'; Pen: Geraghty (3/3) 28', 41', 44'	Report	Try: Bouchet (2) 12' c, 16' m Caminati 63' c Marrou 68' c Con: Hart (3/4) 13', 64', 69'; Pen: Caminati (1/2) 20'; Hart (3/3) 23', 25', 32'; Drop: Caminati (1/1) 29'

Madejski Stadium, Reading
Attendance: 4,030
Referee: Dudley Phillips (Ireland)

24 January 2015
15:00

Rovigo Delta (Italy)	6–34	(England) London Irish (1 BP)
Pen: Basson (2/2) 15', 28'	Report	Try: Treviranus (3) 25' c, 66' m, 72' c Short 57' m Ojo 68' c Con: Geraghty (3/5) 26', 69', 73'; Pen: Geraghty (1/1) 40'

Stadio Mario Battaglini, Rovigo
Attendance: 1,110
Referee: Gary Conway (Ireland)

24 January 2015
15:00

Grenoble (France)	3–28	(Wales) Cardiff Blues (1 BP)
Pen: Hart (1/1) 32'	Report	Try: L. Williams 26' c Penalty try (2) 56' c, 71' c Navidi 78' c Con: Anscombe (3/3) 27', 57', 71'; G. Davies (1/1) 79'

Stade Lesdiguières, Grenoble
Attendance: 7,772
Referee: David Wilkinson (Ireland)

=== Pool 2 ===
Pos	Team	Pld	W	D	L	PF	PA	PD	TF	TA	TB	LB	Pts
1	(England) Exeter Chiefs (2)	6	5	0	1	212	97	+115	26	11	4	1	25
2	(Ireland) Connacht (8)	6	4	0	2	186	144	+42	23	16	4	0	20
3	(France) Bayonne	6	2	0	4	106	165	−59	10	18	0	1	9
4	(France) La Rochelle	6	1	0	5	84	182	−98	10	24	0	0	4

Source: espn.co.uk

18 October 2014
17:00

(1 BP) Connacht (Ireland)	48–12	(France) La Rochelle
Try: Carty 5' c Marmion 9' m Henshaw (2) 31' c, 45' c Loughney 35' c Poolman 52' m Healy 64' c Con: Ronaldson (4/5) 5', 32', 37', 46'; Porter (1/2) 65'; Pen: Ronaldson (1/1) 15'	Report	Try: Cler 42' m Bouldoire 69' c Con: Le Bail (1/2) 70'

Galway Sportsgrounds, Galway
Attendance: 4,735
Referee: Andrew McMenemy (Scotland)

18 October 2014
20:00

Bayonne (France)	30–24	(England) Exeter Chiefs (1 BP)
Try: Fonua 23' c Sayerse 32' c Faʻaoso 77' c Con: Loustalot (3/3) 24', 33', 78'; Pen: Loustalot (3/3) 12', 62', 65'	Report	Try: Hughes c 19'; Rimmer m 53'; Con: Sweeney (1/2) 19'; Pen: Sweeney (3/4) 3', 9', 59'; Arnott (1/1) 6'

Stade Jean Dauger, Bayonne
Attendance: 6,813
Referee: Peter Fitzgibbon (Ireland)

24 October 2014
19:30

La Rochelle (France)	25–13	(France) Bayonne
Try: Berger 7' c Veivuke 29' m Qovu 62' c Con: Le Bail (2/3) 8', 64'; Pen: Le Bail (2/2) 20', 52'	Report	Try: Sayerse 78' c Con: Loustalot (1/1) 79'; Pen: Stewart (2/2) 15', 45'

Stade Marcel-Deflandre, La Rochelle
Attendance: 13,049
Referee: Leighton Hodges (Wales)

25 October 2014
15:00

(1 BP) Exeter Chiefs (England)	33–13	(Ireland) Connacht
Try: Chudley 9' c Slade 20' m Welch 40' c Ewers 46' c White 56' c Con: Steenson (4/5) 9', 40', 47', 57'	Report	Try: Carr 73' c Con: Ronaldson (1/1) 74'; Pen: Ronaldson (2/2) 5', 37'

Sandy Park, Exeter
Attendance: 8,484
Referee: Mathieu Raynal (France)

4 December 2014
20:45

La Rochelle (France)	10–36	(England) Exeter Chiefs (1 BP)
Try: Barraque 35' c Con: Audy (1/1) 36'; Pen: Audy (1/2) 44'	Report	Try: James 29' c Sturgess 32' c McGuigan 73' m Vainikolo 76' m Con: Steenson (2/4) 30', 32'; Pen: Steenson (4/4) 11', 47', 51', 61'

Stade Marcel-Deflandre, La Rochelle
Attendance: 10,864
Referee: Andrew McMenemy (Scotland)

6 December 2014
17:00

(1 BP) Connacht (Ireland)	42–19	(France) Bayonne
Try: Poolman (2) 19' c, 39' m Aki 60' c McSharry 69' c Faloon 72' c Con: Carty (3/4) 20', 61', 70'; Ronaldson (1/1) 73'; Pen: Carty (3/4) 11', 53', 59'	Report	Try: Lapeyrade 45' c Con: Otazo (1/1) 46'; Pen: Bustos Moyano (4/5) 5', 14', 16', 29'

Galway Sportsgrounds, Galway
Attendance: 4,425
Referee: Matthew Carley (England)

13 December 2014
15:00

(1 BP) Exeter Chiefs (England)	41–17	(France) La Rochelle
Try: Horstmann 1' m Bateman 5' m Vainikolo 26' c Penalty try 33' c James 43' c Hughes 63' c Con: Sweeney (4/6) 28', 33', 44', 64'; Pen: Sweeney (1/1) 18'	Report	Try: Berger 51' c Cestaro 68' c Con: Fortassin (1/1) 51'; Barraque (1/1) 69'; Pen: Fortassin (1/1) 13'

Sandy Park, Exeter
Attendance: 9,043
Referee: Leighton Hodges (Wales)

13 December 2014
20:45

(1 BP) Bayonne (France)	27–29	(Ireland) Connacht
Try: Vaka 3' c Ugalde 17' c Sayerse 41' c Con: Loustalot (3/3) 3', 18', 42'; Pen: Loustalot (2/2) 34', 50'	Report	Try: Blade (2) 27' c, 77' c Con: Nikora (2/2) 28', 78'; Pen: Nikora (5/6) 6', 30', 37', 57', 67'

Stade Jean Dauger, Bayonne
Attendance: 4,980
Referee: Ian Davies (Wales)

17 January 2015
17:30

Bayonne (France)	14–0	(France) La Rochelle
Try: Penalty try 20' c Visensang 71' c Con: Bustos Moyano (2/2) 21', 72'	Report

Stade Jean Dauger, Bayonne
Attendance: 2,137
Referee: Giuseppe Vivarini (Italy)

18 January 2015
15:15

(1 BP) Connacht (Ireland)	24–33	(England) Exeter Chiefs
Try: Healy (2) 5' m, 74' c Faloon 23' m Poolman 38' c Con: Carty (2/4) 39', 75'	Report	Try: Penalty Try 19' c Mumm 45' c Armand 62' c Con: Slade (3/3) 20', 46', 63'; Pen: Slade (4/5) 35', 43', 57', 70'

Galway Sportsgrounds, Galway
Attendance: 5,088
Referee: Alexandre Ruiz (France)

24 January 2015
17:30

(1 BP) Exeter Chiefs (England)	45–3	(France) Bayonne
Try: Nowell 3' m Jess 47' m Ewers 60' c Rimmer 69' c Horstmann 74' c Mumm 79' m Con: Steenson (3/4) 61', 70', 75'; Pen: Slade (3/4) 16', 26', 42'	Report	Pen: Bustos Moyano 46'

Sandy Park, Exeter
Attendance: 8,830
Referee: Andrew McMenemy (Scotland)

24 January 2015
18:30

La Rochelle (France)	20–30	(Ireland) Connacht (1 BP)
Try: Penalty try 32' c, Meron 38' c Con: Barraque (2/2) 33', 39'; Pen: Barraque (2/2) 9', 23'	Report	Try: Marmion 2' m McKeon 46' m Adeolokun 74' c Healy 76' c Con: Carty (2/4) 75', 78'; Pen: Carty (2/3) 16', 37'

Stade Marcel-Deflandre, La Rochelle
Attendance: 10,068
Referee: Neil Paterson (Scotland)

=== Pool 3 ===
Pos	Team	Pld	W	D	L	PF	PA	PD	TF	TA	TB	LB	Pts
1	(Wales) Newport Gwent Dragons (3)	6	5	0	1	240	127	+113	31	15	4	1	25
2	(England) Newcastle Falcons (7)	6	4	0	2	208	149	+59	29	20	4	1	21
3	(France) Stade Français	6	3	0	3	155	143	+12	19	13	2	1	15
4	(Romania) București Wolves	6	0	0	6	77	261	−184	8	39	0	1	1

Source: espn.co.uk

17 October 2014
20:00

(1 BP) Newcastle Falcons (England)	43–19	(Romania) București Wolves
Try: Witty 1' m Smith 4' c Harris 18' c Wilson 26' m Penny (2) 29' c, 40' m Nelson 68' c Con: Clegg (3/6) 5', 19', 30'; Smith (1/1) 69'	Report	Try: Ionita 24' c Botezatu (2) 52' m, 59' c Con: Samoa (2/3) 25', 60'

Kingston Park, Newcastle
Attendance: 3,053
Referee: David Wilkinson (Ireland)

18 October 2014
20:45

Stade Français (France)	22–38	(Wales) Newport Gwent Dragons (1 BP)
Try: Bosman 57' c Con: Steyn (1/1) 58'; Pen: Mallet (5/5) 7', 16', 20', 25', 36'	Report	Try: Rees 27' m T. Thomas 31' c Amos 47' c Cudd 76' c Con: O'Brien (3/4) 32', 48', 77'; Pen: O'Brien (4/4) 3', 54', 60', 74'

Stade Jean-Bouin, Paris
Attendance: 6,500
Referee: Luke Pearce (England)

24 October 2014
19:30

(1 BP) Newport Gwent Dragons (Wales)	26–30	(England) Newcastle Falcons
Try: Pewtner 12' m Faletau 31' c A. Smith 40' m Con: Prydie (1/2) 31'; Pen: O'Brien (1/3) 22'; Prydie (2/3) 55', 63'	Report	Try: L. Smith 27' c Wilson 41' c Witty 47' c Con: Clegg (3/3) 28', 42', 48'; Pen: Clegg (2/2) 7', 36'; L. Smith (1/1) 65'

Rodney Parade, Newport
Attendance: 6,119
Referee: Alexandre Ruiz (France)

25 October 2014
15:00

(1 BP) București Wolves (Romania)	9–13	(France) Stade Français
Pen: Vlaicu (3/4 3', 9', 54'	Report	Try: Ioane 40' c Con: Steyn (1/1) 40'; Pen: Steyn (2/2) 32', 42'

Arcul de Triumf, Bucharest
Attendance: 600
Referee: Neil Paterson (Scotland)

5 December 2014
20:00

(1 BP) Newcastle Falcons (England)	30–23	(France) Stade Français (1 BP)
Try: Harris 23' c Hammerslay 28' c Robinson 49' m Cato 69' m Con: Catterick (2/4) 24', 29'; Pen: Catterick (2/4) 45', 66'	Report	Try: Tomas 41' c Inu 60' c Con: Steyn (2/2) 42', 61'; Pen: Steyn (3/3) 9', 26', 35'

Kingston Park, Newcastle
Attendance: 4,089
Referee: Marius Mitrea (Italy)

6 December 2014
13:00

București Wolves (Romania)	10–37	(Wales) Newport Gwent Dragons (1 BP)
Try: Morrell 15' c Con: Vlaicu (1/1) 16'; Pen: Vlaicu (1/1) 5'	Report	Try: A. Smith 36' c T. Thomas 42' m J. Thomas 48' m Hill (2) 58' c, 64' c Con: R. Jones (3/5) 37', 59', 65'; Pen: R. Jones (2/3) 17', 26'

Ghencea Sport Complex, Bucharest
Attendance: 700
Referee: Giuseppe Vivarini (Italy)

11 December 2014
20:45

(1 BP) Stade Français (France)	31–24	(England) Newcastle Falcons (1 BP)
Try: Inu 11' c Camara 16' m Williams 24' m Penalty try 40+2' c Bonfils 69' c Con: Steyn (3/5) 12', 40+2', 70'	Report	Try: Socino 5' c Hammersley 35' c Wilson 46' c Con: Clegg (3/3) 6', 36', 47'; Pen: Clegg (1/3) 61'

Stade Jean-Bouin, Paris
Attendance: 8,500
Referee: Dudley Phillips (Ireland)

12 December 2014
19:30

(1 BP) Newport Gwent Dragons (Wales)	69–17	(Romania) București Wolves
Try: Cudd 8' m Wardle 16' c Amos 20' c J. Evans 22' c Prydie (3) 27' c, 33' m, 53' c T. Thomas 45' m Coombs 62' c R. Jones 75' c L. Jones 80' m Con: R. Jones (7/11) 17', 21', 23', 28', 54', 63', 76'	Report	Try: Mototolea 5' c Surugiu 59' m Botezatu 64' m Con: Vlaicu (1/3) 6'

Rodney Parade, Newport
Attendance: 3,936
Referee: David Wilkinson (Ireland)

17 January 2015
15:00

(1 BP) Stade Français (France)	47–12	(Romania) București Wolves
Try: Sinzelle (2) 8' c, 49' c Ross (2) 16' c, 46' c Camara (2) 56' c, 78' m Ioane 66' c Con: Mallet (6/7) 9', 17', 47', 51', 58', 68'	Report	Pen: Vlaicu (4/5) 5', 12', 21', 26'

Stade Jean-Bouin, Paris
Attendance: 6,673
Referee: Lloyd Lynton (Scotland)

17 January 2015
15:15

(1 BP) Newcastle Falcons (England)	29–40	(Wales) Newport Gwent Dragons (1 BP)
Try: Socino 43' c Harris 50' c Welch 65' c Saull 71' m Con: Catterick (2/2) 44', 52'; Clegg (1/2) 65'; Pen: Catterick (1/1) 3'	Report	Try: T. Morgan 6' c Penalty try 18' c Coombs 21' c Amos (2) 25' c, 58' m Landman 28' c Con: Prydie (5/6) 7', 19', 22', 26', 29'

Kingston Park, Newcastle
Attendance: 3,280
Referee: Mathieu Raynal (France)

24 January 2015
15:00

Newport Gwent Dragons (Wales)	30–19	(France) Stade Français
Try: J. Thomas 4' c T. Thomas 59' m Con: Prydie (1/2) 5'; Pen: Prydie (5/6) 1', 14', 22', 36', 40'; Rhys Jones (1/1) 78'	Report	Try: Inu 29' c Zhvania 46' m Bonfils 69' c Con: Steyn (2/3) 30', 70'

Rodney Parade, Newport
Attendance: 5,571
Referee: Matthew Carley (England)

24 January 2015
17:00

București Wolves (Romania)	10–52	(England) Newcastle Falcons (1 BP)
Try: Dascalu 34' c Con: Statulescu (1/1) 36'; Pen: Statulescu (1/1) 11'	Report	Try: Vickers (2) 7' c, 45' c Socino (2) 20' c, 66' m Tait (2) 25' c, 52' c Penalty try 32' c Davies 79' m Con: Catterick (6/8) 8', 20', 26', 33', 46', 53'

Cluj Arena, Cluj
Attendance: 500
Referee: Neil Hennessy (Wales)

=== Pool 4 ===
Pos	Team	Pld	W	D	L	PF	PA	PD	TF	TA	TB	LB	Pts
1	(Scotland) Edinburgh (5)	6	5	0	1	146	90	+56	14	8	1	1	22
2	(France) Lyon	6	4	0	2	149	139	+10	17	15	2	0	18
3	(France) Bordeaux Bègles	6	3	0	3	176	142	+34	22	14	3	1	16
4	(England) London Welsh	6	0	0	6	72	172	−100	7	23	0	1	1

Source: espn.co.uk

17 October 2014
19:45

(1 BP) Bordeaux Bègles (France)	13–15	(Scotland) Edinburgh
Try: Serin 49' c Con: Beauxis (1/1) 50'; Pen: Beauxis (2/3) 32', 58'	Report	Try: Visser 45' m Penalty try 72' c Con: Heathcote (1/1) 73'; Pen: Heathcote (1/1) 70'

Stade André Moga, Bègles
Attendance: 6,658
Referee: Neil Hennessy (Wales)

18 October 2014
14:00

(1 BP) Lyon (France)	28–18	(England) London Welsh
Try: Januarie 9' c Estebanez 21' c Romanet 31' c Sukanaveita 64' c Con: Porical (4/4) 10', 23', 31', 64'	Report	Try: Elder 38' m J. Lewis 40' c Con: Roberts (1/2) 40'; Pen: Roberts (2/3) 24', 46'

Matmut Stadium, Lyon
Attendance: 8,455
Referee: Claudio Blessano (Italy)

23 October 2014
19:45

London Welsh (England)	20–52	(France) Bordeaux Bègles (1 BP)
Try: Jewell 43' c Browne 70' c Con: Barkley (2/2) 43', 71'; Pen: Barkley (2/4) 2', 15'	Report	Try: Blanc 10' c Talebula 28' c Maynadier 33' c Clarkin 38' c Bernard 50' c Domvo (2) 52' c, 78' c Con: Bernard (7/7) 11', 29', 34', 39', 50', 52', 79'; Pen: Bernard (1/1) 17'

Kassam Stadium, Oxford
Attendance: 3,575
Referee: Andrew McMenemy (Scotland)

24 October 2014
19:45

Edinburgh (Scotland)	25–17	(France) Lyon
Try: Cuthbert 4' c Con: Heathcote (1/1) 5'; Pen: Heathcote (6/8) 2', 11', 20', 25', 32', 80'	Report	Try: Matadigo 16' c Tison 58' c Con: Porical (2/2) 17', 60'; Pen: Porical (1/1) 43'

Murrayfield Stadium, Edinburgh
Attendance: 4,651
Referee: Matthew Carley (England)

6 December 2014
20:45

(1 BP) Bordeaux Bègles (France)	37–29	(France) Lyon
Try: Graham 6' c Lonca (2) 29' c, 52' m Delboulbes 33' m Lacroix 68' c Con: Beauxis (3/5) 7', 30', 69'; Pen: Beauxis (2/2) 12', 22'	Report	Try: Ratuvou 4' c Bonnefond 18' c Con: Porical (2/2) 5', 19'; Pen: Porical (5/5) 26', 37', 39', 46', 64'

Stade André Moga, Bègles
Attendance: 4,250
Referee: Neil Paterson (Scotland)

7 December 2014
14:00

Edinburgh (Scotland)	25–13	(England) London Welsh
Try: Nel 42' m Hidalgo-Clyne 65' c Cochrane 70' c Con: Hidalgo-Clyne (2/2) 66', 71'; Pen: Heathcote (2/3) 1', 20'	Report	Try: Crane 15' c Con: Ross (1/1) 16'; Pen: Ross (2/2) 9', 27'

Murrayfield Stadium, Edinburgh
Attendance: 3,212
Referee: Cédric Marchat (France)

12 December 2014
19:30

(1 BP) Lyon (France)	37–28	(France) Bordeaux Bègles
Try: Loursac (2) 16' c, 38' c Bonnefond 27' c Regard 74' c Con: Porical (4/4) 17', 28', 39', 74'; Pen: Porical (3/4) 42', 57', 80'	Report	Try: Lesgourgues 13' c Avei 45' c Lacroix 70' m Con: Beauxis (2/3) 14', 46'; Pen: Beauxis (2/2) 40', 53'; Drop: Beauxis (1/1) 3'

Matmut Stadium, Lyon
Attendance: 8,733
Referee: Vlad Iordachescu (Romania)

14 December 2014
14:30

London Welsh (England)	6–24	(Scotland) Edinburgh
Pen: Elder (2/2) 23', 48'	Report	Try: Fife 56' m Grant 77' c Con: Tonks (1/1) 78'; Pen: Hidalgo-Clyne (4/4) 16', 26', 38', 46'

Kassam Stadium, Oxford
Attendance: 3,258
Referee: Alexandre Ruiz (France)

16 January 2015
20:55

(1 BP) Bordeaux Bègles (France)	26–3	(England) London Welsh
Try: Maynadier 25' c Brousse 30' m Talebula 67' c Guiry 73' c Con: Bernard (1/2) 26'; Beauxis (2/2) 67', 73'	Report	Pen: Roberts (1/2) 28'

Stade André Moga, Bègles
Attendance: 2,800
Referee: Gary Conway (Ireland)

17 January 2015
20:45

Lyon (France)	21–19	(Scotland) Edinburgh (1 BP)
Try: Loursac 37' c Fitzpatrick 51' m Con: Munro (1/2) 39'; Pen: Munro (1/1) 18'; Porical (1/1) 66'; Drop: Estebanez (1/1) 75'	Report	Try: Visser 7' m Fife 25' m Con: Hidalgo-Clyne (0/2); Pen: Hidalgo-Clyne (3/3) 4', 50', 69'

Matmut Stadium, Lyon
Attendance: 10,935
Referee: Neil Hennessy (Wales)

23 January 2015
19:45

(1 BP) Edinburgh (Scotland)	38–20	(France) Bordeaux Bègles
Try: Hidalgo-Clyne (2) 26' m, 65' c Scott 51' c Nel 56' c Con: Hidalgo-Clyne (3/4) 51', 57', 66'; Pen: Hidalgo-Clyne (4/5) 6', 32', 36', 42'	Report	Try: Serin 54' c Bernard 75' c Con: Bernard (2/2) 54', 75'; Pen: Beauxis (2/2) 23', 33'

Murrayfield Stadium, Edinburgh
Attendance: 4,817
Referee: Ian Davies (Wales)

25 January 2015
14:30

(1 BP) London Welsh (England)	12–17	(France) Lyon
Try: R. Lewis 68' c Britton 76' m Con: Roberts (1/2) 69' c	Report	Try: Regard 7' m Munro 11' m Fitzpatrick 60' c Con: Munro (1/3) 61'

Kassam Stadium, Oxford
Attendance: 3,221
Referee: Vlad Iordachescu (Romania)

=== Pool 5 ===
Pos	Team	Pld	W	D	L	PF	PA	PD	TF	TA	TB	LB	Pts
1	(England) Gloucester (1)	6	6	0	0	211	64	+147	25	6	5	0	29
2	(France) Oyonnax	6	4	0	2	123	124	−1	12	13	0	0	16
3	(Italy) Zebre	6	2	0	4	102	154	−52	10	18	0	0	8
4	(France) Brive	6	0	0	6	93	187	−94	11	21	0	2	2

Source: espn.co.uk

16 October 2014
19:45

(1 BP) Gloucester (England)	55–0	(France) Brive
Try: Sharples (3) 15' c, 49' c, 64' c Hook 45' c Dawidiuk 60' c Robson 72' c penalty try 79' c Con: Laidlaw (3/3) 16', 46', 49'; Hook (1/1) 61'; Cook (3/3) 65', 73', 80'; Pen: Laidlaw (2/2) 31', 42'	Report

Kingsholm Stadium, Gloucester
Attendance: 9,793
Referee: Ian Davies (Wales)

18 October 2014
16:00

Zebre (Italy)	24–33	(France) Oyonnax
Try: Manici 33' m Odiete 59' c Con: Haimona (1/2) 61'; Pen: Padovani (3/5) 8', 13', 19'; Haimona (1/1) 46'	Report	Try: Tian 43' c André 65' c Domenech 71' c Con: Lespinas (3/3) 43', 66', 71'; Pen: Lespinas (4/6) 5', 9', 50', 79'

Stadio XXV Aprile, Parma
Attendance: 2,001
Referee: Matthew Carley (England)

24 October 2014
19:45

(1 BP) Brive (France)	21–26	(Italy) Zebre
Try: Swanepoel 29' c Maʻilei 46' c Sanchou 70' c Con: Swanepoel (3/3) 30', 47', 71'	Report	Try: Haimona 38' c Bernabò 63' c Con: Padovani (2/2) 40', 64'; Pen: Padovani (4/4) 5', 31', 43', 73'

Stade Amédée-Domenech, Brive-la-Gaillarde
Attendance: 3,500
Referee: Neil Hennessy (Wales)

25 October 2014
20:45

Oyonnax (France)	15–25	(England) Gloucester
Pen: Smit (4/4) 9', 31', 38', 45'; Lespinas (1/1) 49'	Report	Try: Kvesic 45' c Con: Laidlaw (1/1) 46; Pen: Laidlaw (6/7) 4', 12', 33', 65', 71', 76'

Stade Charles-Mathon, Oyonnax
Attendance: 6,500
Referee: Giuseppe Vivarini (Italy)

5 December 2014
19:30

Brive (France)	22–30	(France) Oyonnax
Try: Acosta 27' c Luafutu 56' c Uanivi 68' m Con: Sola (2/3) 28', 57'; Pen: Sola (1/2) 42'	Report	Try: Cibray 2' c Aziza 46' c Codjo 74' c Con: Smit (1/1) 3'; Aziza (2/2) 47', 75; Pen: Smit (2/2) 16', 32'; Aziza (1/1) 60'

Stade Amédée-Domenech, Brive-la-Gaillarde
Attendance: 4,000
Referee: Dudley Phillips (Ireland)

7 December 2014
15:15

(1 BP) Gloucester (England)	35–10	(Italy) Zebre
Try: McColl 21' c Hook 29' m Kvesic 71' c Atkinson 75' c Con: Laidlaw (1/2) 22'; Burns (2/2) 71', 76'; Pen: Laidlaw (3/3) 6', 16', 26'	Report	Try: Daniller 8' m Visentin 45' m

Kingsholm Stadium, Gloucester
Attendance: 10,005
Referee: Neil Hennessy (Wales)

13 December 2014
16:00

Zebre (Italy)	16–32	(England) Gloucester (1 BP)
Try: Venditti 67' m van Schalkwyk 72' m Pen: Orquera (2/2) 13', 22'	Report	Try: McColl 27' c Purdy 46' c Sharples 54' m Morgan 59' c Con: Hook (3/4) 28', 47', 59'; Pen: Hook (1/1) 34'; Burns (1/1) 76'

Stadio XXV Aprile, Parma
Attendance: 3,050
Referee: Neil Paterson (Scotland)

13 December 2014
18:30

Oyonnax (France)	22–17	(France) Brive (1 BP)
Try: Hansell-Pune 9' m Bernad 15' c Ngauamo 43' c Con: Lespinas (2/3) 16', 43'; Pen: Lespinas (1/1) 27'	Report	Try: Murphy 25' c Asieshvili 47' c Con: Swanepoel (2/2) 25', 48'; Pen: Swanepoel (1/2) 40'

Stade Charles-Mathon, Oyonnax
Attendance: 5,500
Referee: Gary Conway (Ireland)

17 January 2015
15:00

(1 BP) Gloucester (England)	33–3	(France) Oyonnax
Try: Burns 3' c May 7' c Atkinson 10' m Penalty try 38' c Robson 80' c Con: Laidlaw (4/5) 4', 8', 39', 80'	Report	Pen: Lespinas (1/1) 5'

Kingsholm Stadium, Gloucester
Attendance: 9,381
Referee: Andrew McMenemy (Scotland)

17 January 2015
16:00

Zebre (Italy)	23–13	(France) Brive
Try: Haimona 55' c Penalty try 60' c Con: Orquera (2/2) 55', 61'; Pen: Orquera (3/3) 10', 30', 68'	Report	Try: Vortemaya 51' c Con: Sola (1/1) 52'; Pen: Sola (2/2) 13', 38'

Stadio XXV Aprile, Parma
Attendance: 1,860
Referee: David Wilkinson (Ireland)

22 January 2015
20:45

Brive (France)	20–31	(England) Gloucester (1 BP)
Try: Penalty try 55' c Acquier 78' c Con: Swanepoel (1/1) 56'; Bézy (1/1) 79'; Pen: Swanepoel (2/3) 6', 23'	Report	Try: Kvesic (2) 26' c, 73' c Robson 31' c Penalty try 48' c Con: Hook (4/4) 27', 32', 48', 74'; Pen: Hook (1/3) 13'

Stade Amédée-Domenech, Brive-la-Gaillarde
Attendance: 1,900
Referee: Dudley Phillips (Ireland)

22 January 2015
20:45

Oyonnax (France)	20–3	(Italy) Zebre
Try: Bousses 35' c Ursache 59' m Wannenburg 70' m Con: Lespinas (1/3) 37'; Pen: Lespinas (1/1) 6'	Report	Pen: Orquera (1/2) 43'

Stade Charles-Mathon, Oyonnax
Attendance: 3,500
Referee: Lloyd Lynton (Scotland)

== See also ==
- 2014–15 European Rugby Challenge Cup
