= 2013–14 LV Cup =

Tournament details
- Countries: England; Wales
- Tournament format(s): Round-robin and knockout
- Date: 9 November 2013 – 16 March 2014

Tournament statistics
- Teams: 16
- Matches played: 35
- Attendance: 282,621 (8,075 per match)
- Tries scored: 168 (4.8 per match)

Final
- Venue: Sandy Park, Exeter
- Attendance: 10,744
- Champions: Exeter Chiefs (1st title)
- Runners-up: Northampton Saints

The 2013–14 LV Cup (styled as the LV= Cup) is the 43rd season of England's national rugby union cup competition, and the ninth to follow the Anglo-Welsh format.

The competition consists of the four Welsh Pro12 teams and the twelve English Premiership clubs arranged into pools consisting of three English and one Welsh team. English clubs have been allocated to the pools depending on their finish in the 2012–13 Aviva Premiership. Welsh regions have been allocated to the pools to avoid repeating fixtures from the Heineken and Amlin Challenge Cups where possible. Teams are guaranteed two home and two away pool matches, with teams in Pools 1 and 4 playing each other and teams in Pools 2 and 3 playing each other, with the top team from each pool qualifying for the semi-finals. The competition will take place during the Autumn Internationals window and during the Six Nations thus allowing teams to develop their squad players.

Harlequins are defending champions this season after claiming the cup with a 32–14 victory over Sale Sharks in the final at Sixways Stadium in Worcester. It was the third victory for Harlequins in the competition, and the first since the current Anglo-Welsh format was adopted in 2005.

== Pool stages ==
=== Points system ===
The points scoring system for the pool stages will be as follows:

- 4 points for a win
- 2 points for a draw
- 1 bonus point for scoring four or more tries in a match (TB)
- 1 bonus point for a loss by seven points or less (LB)

=== Pool 1 v Pool 4 ===
Pool 1
Team	P	W	D	L	PF	PA	PD	TF	TA	TB	LB	Pts
(England) Saracens	4	3	0	1	132	59	73	15	8	3	1	16
(England) Gloucester	4	2	0	2	69	54	15	8	7	1	1	10
(England) London Irish	4	1	0	3	83	100	−17	12	9	1	1	6
(Wales) Newport Gwent Dragons	4	1	0	3	49	92	−43	4	12	0	0	4
Updated 2 February 2014 Source: Premiership Rugby

Pool 4
Team	P	W	D	L	PF	PA	PD	TF	TA	TB	LB	Pts
(England) Northampton Saints	4	4	0	0	126	56	70	15	4	2	0	18
(England) Newcastle Falcons	4	2	0	2	69	82	−13	7	8	1	0	9
(Wales) Scarlets	4	2	0	2	54	100	−46	6	13	0	0	8
(England) London Wasps	4	1	0	3	56	95	−39	8	14	0	1	5
Updated 2 February 2014 Source: Premiership Rugby

==== Round 1 ====
8 November 2013
19:30

(BP) London Wasps (England)	21–24	(England) Saracens (BP)
Try: Everard 15' c Cochrane 61' c Jacobs 71' c Con: Carlisle (3/3)	Report	Try: Ransom 29' m Tompkins 40' c Barrington 51' c Wilson 55' m Con: Spencer (2/4)

Adams Park
Attendance: 5,200
Referee: Neil Hennesey (WRU)

8 November 2013
19:30

Scarlets (Wales)	21–13	(Wales) Newport Gwent Dragons
Try: Knight 57' m McCusker 62' c Con: Lewis (1/1); Pen: Thomas (2/3) 7', 18'; Lewis (1/2) 73'	Report	Try: Burton 66' c Con: Burton (1/1); Pen: Burton (1/3) 44'; R. Jones (1/1) 70'

Parc y Scarlets
Attendance: 5,971
Referee: Matthew Carley (RFU)

9 November 2013
17:00

(BP) Northampton Saints (England)	33–6	(England) Gloucester
Try: K. Pisi (2) 23' m, 29' c Day (2) 72' c, 78' m Con: Dickson (1/2); Olver (1/2); Pen: Dickson (3/3) 4', 17', 53'	Report	Pen: Burns (2/2) 7', 12'

Franklin's Gardens
Attendance: 12,870
Referee: Steve Lee (RFU)

10 November 2013
15:00

Newcastle Falcons (England)	29–21	(England) London Irish
Try: Fury 33' c Mayhew 53' c Con: Clegg (2/2); Pen: Clegg (5/6) 6', 12', 17', 47', 71'	Report	Try: Fowlie 13' m Lewington 44' c Con: Geraghty (1/2); Pen: Geraghty (2/3) 19', 27'; Dorrian (1/1) 66'

Kingston Park
Attendance: 3,742
Referee: Darren Gamage (RFU)

==== Round 2 ====
16 November 2013
12:00

Newport Gwent Dragons (Wales)	20–8	(England) London Wasps
Try: Pewtner 30' c Hewitt 71' c Con: R. Jones (2/2); Pen: R. Jones (2/2) 2', 21'	Report	Try: Everard 27' m Pen: Carlisle (1/2) 5'

Rodney Parade
Attendance: 4,150
Referee: Steve Lee (RFU)

16 November 2013
16:30

Gloucester (England)	20–3	(England) Newcastle Falcons
Try: Cook 8' c Tindall 61' c Con: Burns (2/2); Pen: Burns (2/3) 30', 42'	Report	Pen: Clegg (1/1) 18'

Kingsholm
Attendance: 11,168
Referee: Neil Hennessy (WRU)

17 November 2013
15:00

London Irish (England)	18–39	(England) Northampton Saints
Try: Kenny 41' c Low 58' m Con: Dorrian (1/2); Pen: Dorrian (2/3) 35', 40+1'	Report	Try: Packman 26' c Waller 37' c Nutley 64' c Con: Dickson (3/3); Pen: Dickson (6/7) 3', 18', 21', 33', 54', 61'

Madejski Stadium
Attendance: 5,792
Referee: Rhys Thomas (WRU)

17 November 2013
15:00

(BP) Saracens (England)	51–10	(Wales) Scarlets
Try: Hankin 7' c Wilson 12' c Wray 39' c George 47' c Earle 71' c Streather 78' c Con: Spencer (4/4); Mordt (2/2); Pen: Spencer (3/3) 22', 30', 34'	Report	Try: Harris 25' c Con: Lewis (1/1); Pen: Lewis (1/1) 20'

Allianz Park
Attendance: 4,166
Referee: Martin Fox (RFU)

==== Round 3 ====
24 January 2014
19:30

Scarlets (Wales)	13–7	(England) Gloucester (BP)
Try: Hughes 33' m A. Warren 76' m Pen: Lewis (1/1) 59'	Report	Try: B. Burns 54' c Con: B. Burns (1/1)

Parc y Scarlets
Attendance: 5,487
Referee: Neil Hennessy (WRU)

25 January 2014
14:30

Newport Gwent Dragons (Wales)	16–34	(England) Northampton Saints (BP)
Try: L. Jones 40' c Con: Tovey (1/1); Pen: Tovey (3/5) 12', 14', 26'	Report	Try: Penalty try 21' c Autagavaia 27' m Haywood 45' c Denman 52' m Van Velze 68' c Con: Dickson (3/5); Pen: Dickson (1/1) 7'

Rodney Parade
Attendance: 6,011
Referee: Andrew Small (RFU)

25 January 2014
15:00

London Wasps (England)	22–15	(England) London Irish (BP)
Try: Davies 3' c Jackson 19' m Bassett 23' c Con: Carlisle (2/3); Pen: Carlisle (1/2) 66'	Report	Try: Tagicakibau 11' m Hala'ufia 35' m Hagan 62' m

Adams Park
Attendance: 5,039
Referee: Darren Gamage (RFU)

26 January 2014
15:00

(BP) Saracens (England)	41–8	(England) Newcastle Falcons
Try: Wray (2) 47' m, 51' c Ransom 63' c Jubb 78' c Con: Spencer (3/4); Pen: Spencer (5/5) 3', 9', 12', 21', 40+1'	Report	Try: Catterick 14' m Pen: Hodgson (1/3) 29'

Allianz Park
Attendance: 5,559
Referee: Greg MacDonald (RFU)

==== Round 4 ====
31 January 2014
19:45

(BP) Newcastle Falcons (England)	29–0	(Wales) Newport Gwent Dragons
Try: Godman 6' c Wilson (2) 19' m, 26' c McKenzie 77' c Con: Godman (2/3); Clegg (1/1); Pen: Godman (1/1) 40+1'	Report

Kingston Park
Attendance: 3,326
Referee: Daniel Jones (WRU)

1 February 2014
15:00

(BP) Gloucester (England)	36–5	(England) London Wasps
Try: Trinder (2) 13' m, 16' c Cox (2) 19' c, 58' c Murphy 72' c Con: Cook (4/5); Pen: Cook (1/2) 40+1'	Report	Try: Johnson 23' m

Kingsholm
Attendance: 10,750
Referee: Greg MacDonald (RFU)

1 February 2014
15:00

Northampton Saints (England)	20–16	(England) Saracens (BP)
Try: Wilson 13' c Manoa (2) 51' m, 69' m Con: Hooley (1/2); Pen: Hooley (1/2) 56'	Report	Try: Spencer 33' c Con: Spencer (1/1); Pen: Spencer (3/3) 25', 59', 65'

Franklin's Gardens
Attendance: 13,256
Referee: JP Doyle (RFU)

1 February 2014
16:00

(BP) London Irish (England)	29–10	(Wales) Scarlets
Try: Fenby 3' m Geraghty 25' c Hagan 35' m Tagicakibau 40' m Dorrian 74' c Con: Geraghty (1/4); Humphreys (1/1)	Report	Try: Earle 70' c Con: Owen (1/1); Pen: Lewis (1/1) 6'

Madejski Stadium
Attendance: 5,214
Referee: Steve Lee (RFU)

=== Pool 2 v Pool 3 ===
Pool 2
Team	P	W	D	L	PF	PA	PD	TF	TA	TB	LB	Pts
(England) Exeter Chiefs	4	3	0	1	112	67	45	13	9	2	0	14
(England) Sale Sharks	4	2	0	2	107	96	11	13	9	2	2	12
(Wales) Cardiff Blues	4	2	0	2	85	63	22	9	9	1	1	10
(England) Leicester Tigers	4	2	0	2	83	89	−6	8	11	1	0	9
Updated 2 February 2014 Source: Premiership Rugby

Pool 3
Team	P	W	D	L	PF	PA	PD	TF	TA	TB	LB	Pts
(England) Bath	4	4	0	0	123	65	58	15	7	3	0	19
(Wales) Ospreys	4	1	0	3	88	132	−44	10	16	2	0	6
(England) Harlequins	4	1	0	3	56	91	−35	7	10	0	1	5
(England) Worcester Warriors	4	1	0	3	48	99	−51	6	10	0	1	5
Updated 2 February 2014 Source: Premiership Rugby

==== Round 1 ====
8 November 2013
19:30

(BP) Cardiff Blues (Wales)	16–21	(England) Worcester Warriors
Try: Young 52' c Con: Humberstone (1/1); Pen: G. Davies (2/2) 8', 11'; Humberstone (1/2) 65'	Report	Try: O'Donnell 12' c Stephenson 26' c Stelling 37' c Con: Mieres (3/3)

Cardiff Arms Park
Attendance: 6,823
Referee: Gwyn Morris (WRU)

8 November 2013
19:45

(BP) Leicester Tigers (England)	39–16	(Wales) Ospreys
Try: Waldrom 27' m Harrison 61' c Wells 69' m Noone 79' c Con: O. Williams (2/4); Pen: O. Williams (5/6) 5', 7', 14', 43', 49'	Report	Try: S. Williams 72' c Con: S. Davies (1/1); Pen: S. Davies (3/5) 16', 20', 33'

Welford Road
Attendance: 18,098
Referee: David Rose (RFU)

8 November 2013
19:45

(BP) Sale Sharks (England)	20–27	(England) Bath
Try: Paterson 28' c Haley 76' c Con: Ford (1/1); Macleod (1/1); Pen: Ford (1/1) 1'; Macleod (1/1) 69'	Report	Try: Perenise 21' c Banahan 63' c Attwood 80+2' c Con: Heathcote (3/3); Pen: Heathcote (1/3) 37'; Drop: Heathcote 55'

Salford City Stadium
Attendance: 3,572
Referee: Simon Rees (WRU)

9 November 2013
15:00

Exeter Chiefs (England)	19–5	(England) Harlequins
Try: Naqelevuki 59' c Con: Sweeney (1/1); Pen: Sweeney (4/5) 7', 16', 46', 54'	Report	Try: Sackey 4' m

Sandy Park
Attendance: 9,333
Referee: Dean Richards (RFU)

==== Round 2 ====
15 November 2013
19:30

Ospreys (Wales)	13–21	(Wales) Cardiff Blues
Try: Spratt 37' c Con: Morgan (1/1); Pen: Morgan (2/3) 20', 27'	Report	Try: Dacey 24' m Cook 70' c Con: Humberstone (1/2); Pen: Humberstone (2/2) 7', 16'; Drop: Humberstone (1) 73

Liberty Stadium
Attendance: 5,706
Referee: Greg MacDonald (RFU)

15 November 2013
19:45

(BP) Harlequins (England)	26–31	(England) Sale Sharks (BP)
Try: Botica 8' c Walker 52' c Con: Botica (2/2); Pen: Botica (4/4) 40+2', 43', 62', 72'	Report	Try: Seymour 17' c Miller 33' c Gaskell 47' c Cipriani 68' c Con: Macleod (4/4); Pen: Macleod (1/1) 23'

The Stoop
Attendance: 12,049
Referee: Ian Tempest (RFU)

15 November 2013
19:45

(BP) Worcester Warriors (England)	18–21	(England) Leicester Tigers
Try: Symons 5' m Abbott 16' m Scotland-Williamson 79' m Pen: Warwick (1/4) 52'	Report	Try: Noone 45' m Penalty try 67' c Con: Williams (1/2); Pen: Williams (2/3) 19', 33'; Drop: Williams 40'

Sixways
Attendance: 9,855
Referee: Gwyn Morris (WRU)

17 November 2013
13:00

(BP) Bath (England)	37–15	(England) Exeter Chiefs
Try: Banahan 1' c Garvey 2' c Roberts 32' c Beech 70' c Con: Ford (3/3); Heathcote (1/1); Pen: Ford (2/2) 39', 49'; Heathcote (1/1) 79'	Report	Try: Phillips 59' m Bateman 76' c Con: Sweeney (1/1); Pen: Slade (1/1) 7'

Recreation Ground
Attendance: 11,323
Referee: Andrew Small (RFU)

==== Round 3 ====
25 January 2014
14:00

Sale Sharks (England)	20–6	(England) Worcester Warriors
Try: Easter 56' c Ingall 70' c Con: Ford (2/2); Pen: Ford (2/2) 4', 41'	Report	Pen: Davies (2/4) 49', 61'

Salford City Stadium
Attendance: 3,462
Referee: Steve Lee (RFU)

25 January 2014
15:00

(BP) Bath (England)	24–13	(Wales) Cardiff Blues
Try: Faosiliva 7' m Young 26' c Henson 48' c Mercer 74' m Con: Heathcote (2/4)	Report	Try: Fish 76' c Con: Humberstone (1/1); Pen: Humberstone (2/3) 5', 35'

Recreation Ground
Attendance: 11,847
Referee: Dean Richards (RFU)

25 January 2014
15:00

(BP) Exeter Chiefs (England)	36–22	(Wales) Ospreys (BP)
Try: Cowan-Dickie (2) 14' m, 48' c Scaysbrook 44' c Phillips 59' c Armand 70' c Con: Sweeney (4/5); Pen: Sweeney (1/1) 22'	Report	Try: Howells 8' m Allen 17' m Jenkins 51' c Grabham 55' m Con: Morgan (1/4)

Sandy Park
Attendance: 8,760
Referee: Ben Whitehouse (WRU)

25 January 2014
15:00

Harlequins (England)	20–6	(England) Leicester Tigers
Try: Sackey 11' m Fa'asavalu 17' m Guest 51' c Con: Botica (1/3); Pen: Botica (1/2) 37'	Report	Pen: Lamb (2) 4', 32'

The Stoop
Attendance: 7,842
Referee: Gwyn Morris (WRU)

==== Round 4 ====
31 January 2014
19:05

(BP) Cardiff Blues (Wales)	35–5	(England) Harlequins
Try: Paulo 29' c Evans 34' c Fish 42' c T. Williams 46' c Breeze 79' c Con: Humberstone (5/5)	Report	Try: Lindsay-Hague 39' m

Cardiff Arms Park
Attendance: 5,967
Referee: Matthew Carley (RFU)

31 January 2014
19:30

(BP) Ospreys (Wales)	37–36	(England) Sale Sharks (2 BP)
Try: Natoga (3) 8' c, 45' c, 80' c Baker 60' c Con: Davies (4/4); Pen: Davies (3/3) 7', 21', 67'	Report	Try: Fihaki (3) 2' c, 12' c, 35' c Ingall 30' c Haley 47' m Con: Ford (4/5); Pen: Ford (1/1) 54'

Liberty Stadium
Attendance: 3,189
Referee: Craig Evans (WRU)

31 January 2014
19:45

Leicester Tigers (England)	17–35	(England) Bath (BP)
Try: Matera 8' c Scully 22' c Con: Williams (2/2); Pen: Williams (1/2) 31'	Report	Try: Fa'osiliva 16' m Banahan 35' c Devoto 58' c Fearns 66' c Con: Henson (3/4); Pen: Henson (3/3) 1', 26', 52'

Welford Road
Attendance: 20,616
Referee: Wayne Barnes (RFU)

1 February 2014
15:00

Worcester Warriors (England)	3–42	(England) Exeter Chiefs (BP)
Pen: Pennell (1/1) 27'	Report	Try: James 4' m Steenson 37' c Thomas (2) 68' c, 77' c Sweeney 79' c Con: Steenson (4/5); Pen: Steenson (3/4) 21', 24', 48'

Sixways
Attendance: 5,447
Referee: Leighton Hodges (WRU)

== Knockout stage ==
Semi-finals
9 March – Recreation Ground
(England) Bath	19
(England) Exeter Chiefs	22
8 March – Franklin's Gardens
(England) Northampton Saints	26
(England) Saracens	7

Final
16 March – Sandy Park
(England) Exeter Chiefs	15
(England) Northampton Saints	8

=== Qualification criteria ===
The top teams from each pool qualify for the knockout stages. The pool winners will be decided by the following criteria:

1. The pool winner will be the club with the highest number of match points in each pool. The pool winners will be ranked 1 to 4 by reference to the number of match points earned in the pools.
2. If two or more clubs in the same pool end the pool stage equal on match points, then the order in which they have finished will be determined by:

i. the greater number of matches won by the club and
ii. if the number of matches won is equal, the club with the greater total number of tries scored and
iii. if the total number of tries scored is equal, the club with the greater points difference (points scored for, less points scored against) and
iv. if the points difference is equal, the club with the fewer number of red cards and
v. if the number of red cards is the same, by the toss a coin.

Each of the four qualifying clubs shall be ranked as above and shall play each other as follows:

Semi-final 1 – 1st ranked club v 4th ranked club
Semi-final 2 – 2nd ranked club v 3rd ranked club

The first club listed in each of the semi-final matches shall be the home club.

Qualifiers
Rank	Team	P	W	D	L	PF	PA	PD	TF	TA	TB	LB	Pts
1	(England) Bath	4	4	0	0	123	65	58	15	7	3	0	19
2	(England) Northampton Saints	4	4	0	0	126	56	70	15	4	2	0	18
3	(England) Saracens	4	3	0	1	132	59	73	15	8	3	1	16
4	(England) Exeter Chiefs	4	3	0	1	112	67	45	13	9	2	0	14

=== Semi-finals ===
8 March 2014
12:30

Northampton Saints (England)	26 – 7	(England) Saracens
Try: G. Pisi (3) 51' m, 64' m, 77' c Con: Myler (1/3); Pen: Hooley (2/2) 5', 9'; Drop: Myler 59'	Report	Try: Ransom 20' c Con: Spencer (1/1)

Franklin's Gardens
Attendance: 11,062
Referee: Leighton Hodges (WRU)

9 March 2014
13:00

Bath (England)	19 – 22	(England) Exeter Chiefs
Try: Houston 1' c Con: Heathcote (1/1); Pen: Heathcote (4/5) 19', 35', 47', 63'	Report	Try: Arscott (2) 26' m, 51' c Vainikolo 57' c Con: Slade (2/3); Pen: Slade (1/3) 8'

Recreation Ground
Attendance: 9,225
Referee: Tim Wigglesworth (RFU)

=== Final ===
16 March 2014
15:00

Exeter Chiefs (England)	15–8	(England) Northampton Saints
Try: Whitehead 3' m Mumm 49' c Con: Slade (1/2); Pen: Slade (1/1) 36'	Report	Try: Manoa 69' m Pen: Dickson (1/1) 11'

Sandy Park, Exeter
Attendance: 10,744
Referee: Andrew Small (New Zealand)

15	(England) Luke Arscott
14	(Tonga) Fet'u Vainikolo
13	(Wales) Phil Dollman
12	(New Zealand) Jason Shoemark
11	(England) Matt Jess
10	(England) Henry Slade
9	(England) Dave Lewis
8	(England) Kai Horstmann
7	(Australia) Ben White
6	(England) Dave Ewers
5	(England) Damian Welch
4	(Australia) Dean Mumm (c)
3	(New Zealand) Hoani Tui
2	(England) Chris Whitehead
1	(England) Ben Moon
Replacements:
16	(England) Luke Cowan-Dickie
17	(England) Carl Rimmer
18	(England) Alex Brown
19	(New Zealand) Romana Graham
20	(England) Don Armand
21	(England) Haydn Thomas
22	(Ireland) Gareth Steenson
23	(Fiji) Sireli Naqelevuki
Coach:
(England) Rob Baxter

15	(England) Ben Foden
14	(Samoa) Ken Pisi
13	(Samoa) George Pisi
12	(New Zealand) James Wilson
11	(England) Jamie Elliott
10	(New Zealand) Glenn Dickson
9	(Samoa) Kahn Fotuali'i
8	(South Africa) Gerrit-Jan van Velze
7	(England) Phil Dowson (c)
6	(England) Calum Clark
5	(England) Christian Day
4	(United States) Samu Manoa
3	(Australia) Salesi Ma'afu
2	(England) Mike Haywood
1	(England) Alex Waller
Replacements:
16	(England) Ross McMillan
17	(England) Ethan Waller
18	(England) Tom Mercey
19	(England) James Craig
20	(England) Ben Nutley
21	(England) Alex Day
22	(England) Will Hooley
23	(Samoa) Fa'atoina Autagavaia
Coach:
(England) Jim Mallinder

- In previous seasons, the winner of the Anglo-Welsh Cup (if English) was awarded with a place in the following season's Heineken Cup. This is no longer the case with the advent of the Rugby Champions Cup.

== Top scorers ==
=== Top points scorers ===
Rank	Player	Team	Points
1	Ben Botica	(England) Harlequins	78
2	Danny Cipriani	(England) Sale Sharks	73
3	Steffan Jones	(Wales) Dragons	50
4	Ryan Lamb	(England) Northampton Saints	48
5	Tom Heathcote	(England) Bath	43
6	Nils Mordt	(England) Saracens	42
7	Matthew Morgan	(Wales) Ospreys	39
8	Owen Williams	(Wales) Scarlets	36
9	Tommy Bell	(England) London Wasps	35
9	Ben Spencer	(England) Saracens	35

=== Top try scorers ===
Rank	Player	Team	Tries
1	Tonderai Chavhanga	(Wales) Dragons	3
1	Danny Cipriani	(England) Sale Sharks	3
1	Andy Fenby	(Wales) Scarlets	3
1	Ben Morgan	(England) Gloucester	3
1	Jack Nowell	(England) Exeter	3
1	Semesa Rokoduguni	(England) Bath	3
1	Tom Williams	(England) Harlequins	3
1	Marland Yarde	(England) London Irish	3

== See also ==
- 2013–14 English Premiership (rugby union)
- 2013–14 Pro 12
