= Seremaia Burotu =

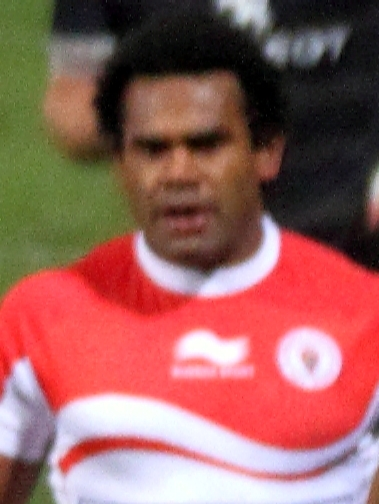
- Seremaia Burotu in 2013
- Born: Seremaia Nakala Burotu; 19 July 1987 (age 39)
- Height: 1.84 m (6 ft 1/2 in)
- Weight: 105 kg (231 lb; 16.5 st)
- School: Queen Victoria School (Fiji)

Rugby union career
- Position(s): Number 8, Inside centre, wing
Senior career
Years	Team	Apps	(Points)
2011–2016	Biarritz	83	(45)
2016–2018	Brive	30	(30)
2018–	Provence	1	(0)
- Correct as of 19 August 2018
International career
Years	Team	Apps	(Points)
2008–2011	Fiji Sevens	20	(0)
–	Fiji national	2	

Seremaia "Jerry" Burotu (born 19 July 1987) in Tavua is a Fijian rugby union footballer. He currently plays for the French team Provence Rugby and the Fiji national rugby union team and usually plays as a Number 8, Inside centre or wing.

== Career ==
Burotu who is from Korovou Village in Tavua, started his career playing for Tavua in the Digicel Cup in 2006. He was selected by the then Fiji 7's coach, Jo Savou to join the Fiji sevens team for the last leg of the 2007–08 IRB Sevens World Series. He made his debut at the 2008 London Sevens His impact on the big stage was massive. He scored 4 tries in that tournament. He finished the 2010–11 IRB Sevens World Series with 29 tries.

He joined Top 14 side, Biarritz in April 2011. His ability to score tries with blistering speed and power attracted scouts from the Biarritz following the withdrawal of some of its key players including centres Yann Fior and Arnaud Mignardi who has signed for Brive for two seasons. He played for them in the 2012–13 European Challenge Cup and the 2013–14 European Challenge Cup pool stage.

In May 2016, he signed for Brive in the Top 14 competition.
