= Jimmy Stevens (rugby union) =

English rugby union player

- Born: Jimmy David Stevens; 27 January 1991 (age 35) Truro, Cornwall
- Height: 1.67 m (5 ft 6 in)
- Weight: 101 kg (15 st 13 lb)
- School: St Ives School, Truro College

Rugby union career
- Position: Hooker
- Current team: St ives
Senior career
Years	Team	Apps	(Points)
2011–2013	Leicester Tigers	5	(0)
2010–2013	Nottingham (loan)	31	(0)
2013–2016	London Irish	42	(15)
2016–2018	Nottingham	33	(50)
2018–2020	Leicester Tigers	6	(0)
2010–	Total	117	(65)
- Correct as of 3 January 2020

Jimmy David Stevens (born 27 January 1991) is an English former professional rugby union player, most recently playing for Leicester Tigers in Premiership Rugby. He played as a Hooker. Stevens joined London Irish in 2013, and played 42 times before leaving for a two-season spell at Nottingham.

== Early life ==
Jimmy was born in Truro, Cornwall, and grew up in the town of St Ives. He started playing rugby at his local club, St Ives RFC, along with his older brothers Louis and Tony, before moving to Redruth RFC junior section, where he continued his development under the guidance of coaches Nigel Thomas, Phil Olds and Paul Hancock. Jimmy's performances for Redruth and his county side saw him selected for England Under 16s, where he took part in an unbeaten 4 Nations tournament. Jimmy continued his rugby at Truro College and international honours continued, with call-ups to the England U18 and U19 teams.

== Professional career ==
Jimmy signed an academy contract with Leicester Tigers, before being promoted to the first team in 2011/2012. Here he was lucky enough to play with the likes of George Chuter and Tom Youngs, and spent some time on loan to Nottingham RFC. His continued performances saw him signed to London Irish by head coach Brian Smith at the start of this season, and he made an immediate impact, with 3 tries from his first 6 appearances and a near faultless performance in his first game in the Amlin Cup.
