= Grégory Arganese =

French rugby union player

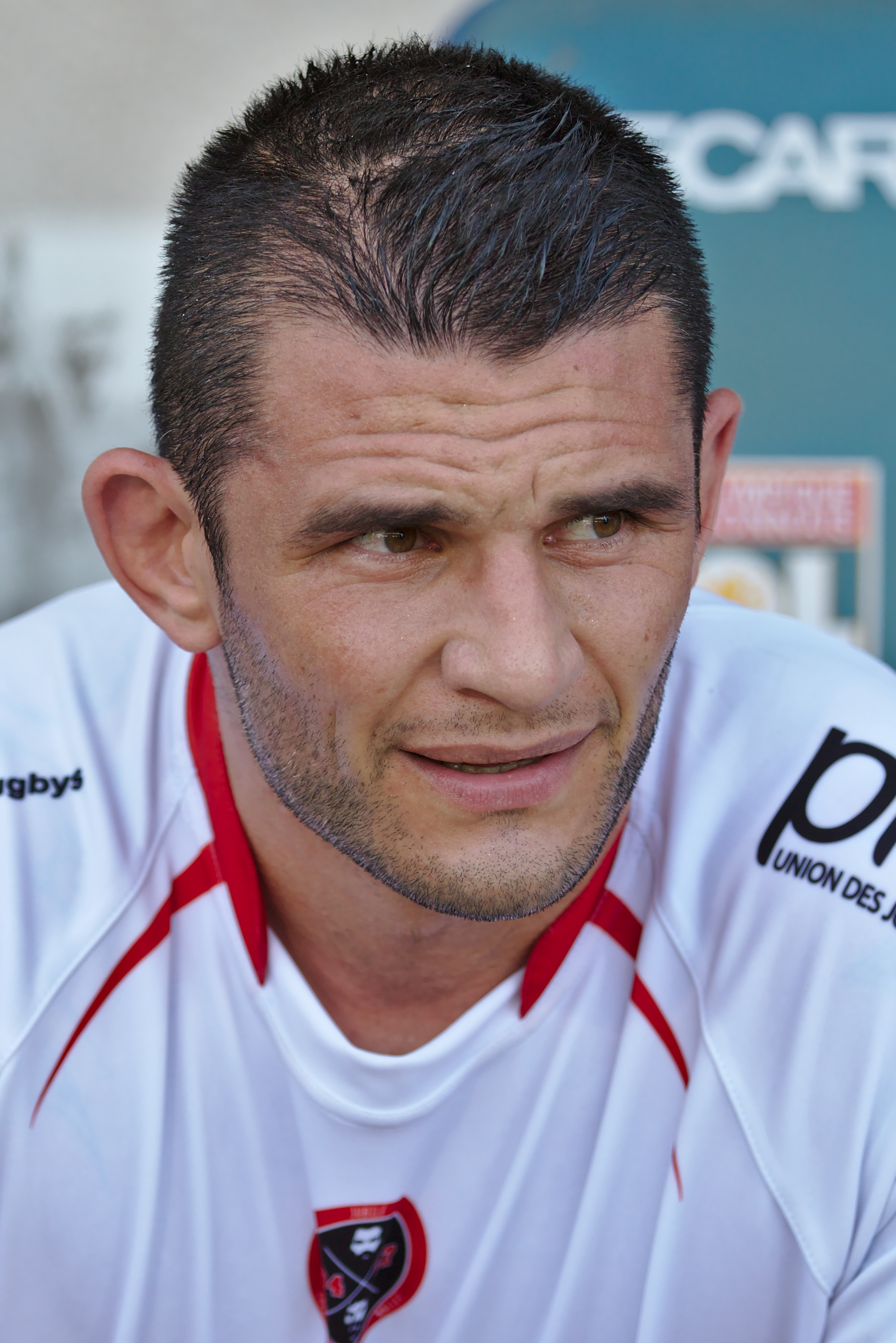
- Born: Grégory Arganese; 15 September 1982 (age 44) Castres, France
- Height: 1.82 m (6 ft 0 in)
- Weight: 95 kg (14 st 13 lb)

Rugby union career
- Position: Hooker
Senior career
Years	Team	Apps	(Points)
2004–2005	Castres	12	(0)
2005–2010	Montauban	93	(40)
2010–2012	Racing Metro	25	(0)
2012–2019	Bayonne	120	(11)
- Correct as of 30 November 2019

Grégory Arganese is a French professional rugby union player. He plays at hooker for Bayonne in the Top 14.
