= Thomas Laranjeira =

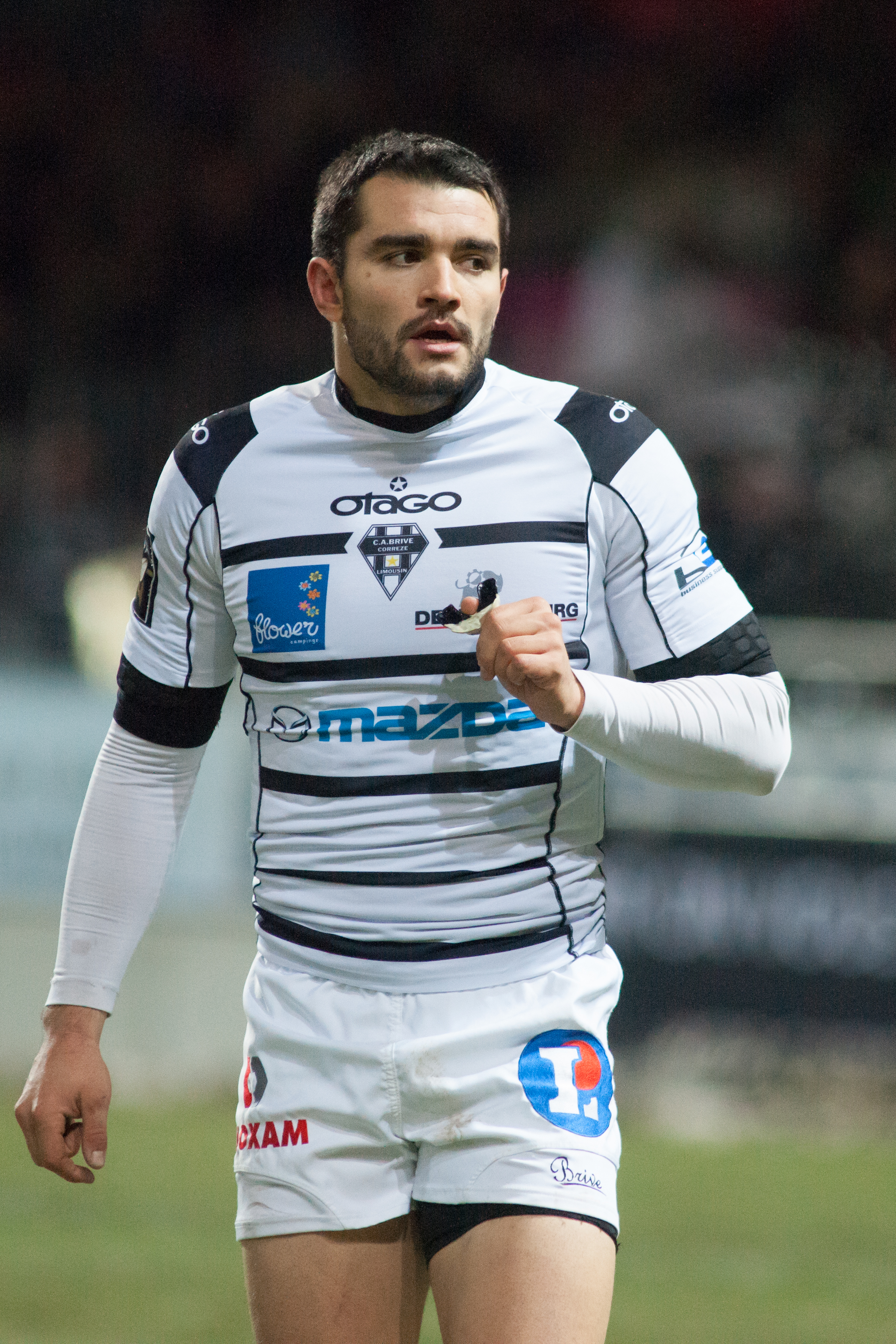
- Laranjeira playing for Brive in 2013
- Born: Thomas Laranjeira; 5 May 1992 (age 34) Belleville-sur-Saône, France
- Height: 1.80 m (5 ft 11 in)
- Weight: 88 kg (13 st 12 lb; 194 lb)

Rugby union career
- Position(s): Fly-half, Fullback
- Current team: Brive
Amateur team(s)
Years	Team	Apps	(Points)
2007–2010	Bourgoin-Jallieu		
2010–2012	Brive		
Senior career
Years	Team	Apps	(Points)
2012–	Brive	202	(1071)
- Correct as of 1 December 2019
International career
Years	Team	Apps	(Points)
2012	France U20	3	(5)
- Correct as of 21 June 2012

Thomas Laranjeira (born 5 May 1992) is a French rugby union player. His position is either Fly-half or Fullback and he currently plays for Brive in the Top 14.
