= Chris Knight (rugby union) =

Welsh rugby player

- Born: 28 February 1991 (age 35) Swansea, Wales
- Height: 178 cm (5 ft 10 in)
- Weight: 88 kg (13 st 12 lb)
- School: Bishop Gore School
- University: University of Reading

Rugby union career
- Position: Wing
Senior career
Years	Team	Apps	(Points)
2013-2014	Scarlets	3	(5)
2014-2016	Cardiff Blues	1	(0)
International career
Years	Team	Apps	(Points)
2013-	Wales Sevens	36	(100)

Chris Knight (born 28 February 1991) is a Welsh rugby union player. He is currently a member of the 2015–16 Wales sevens squad as a winger.

After scoring 14 tries in his first full season for Llandovery RFC in the Principality Premiership, Knight made his debut for Wales on the HSBC World Series in the penultimate round of the 2012–13 season. He scored five tries in his first two tournaments and was rewarded with his first professional contract with Wales sevens and the Scarlets for the 2013–14 season. In June 2014, he joined the Cardiff Blues. He has a very hard head.

== Education ==
Knight was educated at Bishop Gore School between 2001 and 2009.

== International sevens ==
Knight has represented Wales playing in 10 tournaments on the IRB Sevens World Series, scoring 20 tries. Knight was also a member of Wales 2013 Rugby World Cup sevens team playing in all 4 matches and scoring 2 tries.
