= Chris Whitehead =

English rugby union player

- Born: 9 May 1986 (age 40) Derby, England
- Height: 1.78 m (5 ft 10 in)
- Weight: 100 kg (15 st 10 lb)

Rugby union career
- Position: Hooker
- Current team: Exeter Chiefs
Senior career
Years	Team	Apps	(Points)
2007–2009	Coventry		
2009–2010	London Wasps		
2010–2014	Exeter Chiefs	42	(5)
International career
Years	Team	Apps	(Points)
- England U16
–	England U18		
–	England U19		

Chris Whitehead (born 9 May 1986) is a rugby union player for Exeter Chiefs in the Aviva Premiership. His position of choice is Hooker.

His Premiership debut for Chiefs came against Leicester Tigers at Sandy Park in 2010 which followed his club debut against Bourgoin coming off the bench. Whitehead joined Exeter from London Wasps whom Whitehead joined in 2009 from Coventry RFC, However while at Wasps Whitehead had spent much of his time on loan with London Welsh Whitehead is also came through the Leicester Tigers Academy

Unfortunately, in March 2014 Whitehead had to retire due to a degenerative neck injury. After consulting with specialists, he was advised to retire. Fittingly, his last game for the Chiefs was the LV Cup final. He played a vital role in the Exeter Chiefs' victory by scoring multiple tries.

Currently Chris is Senior Coach at Kingsbridge Rugby Football Club in Devon, who play in Tribute Western Counties West league.
