= James Thomas (rugby union) =

- Born: James Thomas; 17 August 1990 (age 36) Newport, Wales
- Height: 190 cm (6 ft 3 in)
- Weight: 105 kg (16 st 7 lb)

Rugby union career
- Current team: Dragons
Senior career
Years	Team	Apps	(Points)
2009–2018	Dragons	54	(15)
International career
Years	Team	Apps	(Points)
2010–	Wales U-20	1	(0)

James Thomas (born 17 August 1990, Newport, Wales) is a Welsh rugby union player. A Number 8 forward, he has represented Wales at Under-18 and Under-20 level.

Thomas played for Blackwood RFC, Ebbw Vale RFC, the Newport Gwent Dragons Under-20 regional team and Newport RFC. He made his debut for the Dragons senior team versus Sale Sharks on 6 November 2009 as a second-half replacement.

On 22 December 2009 he was named in the Wales Under 20 Squad for the 2010 Under-20 Six Nations tournament. In May 2010 he was selected in the Wales Under 20 Squad for the Junior World Cup in Argentina in June 2010.

Thomas left the Dragons in December 2018.
