= Simon Humberstone =

English rugby union player (born 1987)

- Born: Simon Humberstone; 31 July 1987 (age 39) Basingstoke, England
- Height: 182 cm (6 ft 0 in)
- Weight: 88 kg (13 st 12 lb; 194 lb)

Rugby union career
- Position: Fly-half
- Current team: Hull
Senior career
Years	Team	Apps	(Points)
2013-15	Cardiff Blues	7	(17)
2015-	Doncaster Knights		
- Correct as of 15 February 2014

Simon Humberstone (born 31 July 1987) is an English rugby union player, currently at Hull playing in National League 2 North, having previously played for Doncaster Knights in the RFU Championship, Pontypridd in the Principality Premiership and the Cardiff Blues regional team.

Humberstone graduated through the Harlequins Academy, gaining representative honours with South East England and England Students.

Following a season spent playing with Heriot RFC in the Otago province of New Zealand, Simon returned to the UK to study at UWIC, featuring prominently as a high scoring outside half in the college's championship winning division one east campaign.

The outside half had been targeted by a number of Premiership clubs, but decided on a move to Pontypridd, which will bolster the club's strength in depth in the crucial half back department.

In January 2014 Humberstone signed a full-time contract with Cardiff Blues.
