= Bastien Fuster =

- Born: Bastien Fuster; 21 January 1992 (age 34) Niort
- Height: 1.85 m (6 ft 1 in)
- Weight: 90 kg (14 st 2 lb)

Rugby union career
- Position: Wing
Senior career
Years	Team	Apps	(Points)
2012–2019	Bayonne	113	(90)
2019–2021	Rouen Normandie	26	(10)
2021–2022	Boucau Tarnos Stade	?	(?)
- Correct as of 12 February 2026
International career
Years	Team	Apps	(Points)
2012	France A	8	(15)
2018	Spain	2	(0)
- Correct as of 4 December 2019

Bastien Fuster (born 21 January 1992) is a former French-Spanish professional rugby union player. He played at wing. He was international with the Spain national rugby union team.

== Personal life ==
Born in France, Fuster is of Spanish descent.
