= Darren Allinson =

Welsh rugby player

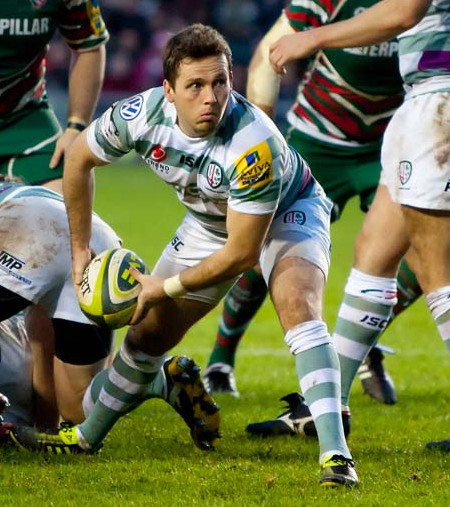
- Born: Darren Allinson; 13 November 1988 (age 38) Carmarthen, Wales
- Height: 1.77 m (5 ft 10 in)
- Weight: 82 kg (12 st 13 lb)

Rugby union career
- Position: Scrum-half
Senior career
Years	Team	Apps	(Points)
2007–2010	Cardiff Blues	36	(0)
2010–2017	London Irish	131	(19)
2016–2017	→Bath Rugby		
2017-2019	Bath Rugby		

Darren Allinson (born 13 November 1987), a Welsh professional rugby union player. Allinson formerly played for Bath Rugby in the Aviva Premiership and plays at scrum half. He attended Ysgol Y Gwendraeth.

== Cardiff Blues ==
Allinson joined Cardiff Blues in 2007 at the age of 18 from the Llanelli Scarlets Academy. He made 36 first team appearances at the Arms Park along with a winners medal when the Blues beat Toulon in the Amlin Cup (2010).

== London Irish ==
Allinson joined London Irish in 2010 and made an immediate impact with over 20 first team appearances in his first season. He has since made 109 first XV appearances to date with a Man of the Match performance against Cardiff Blues in the Heineken Cup (2012).

== Bath ==
Allison was loaned to Bath as injury cover in November 2016. Before signing a permanent deal on 20 February 2017

== International ==
Representative Honours;

Wales U16, U18, U19, U20
