= Davide Farolini =

Italian rugby union player (born 1992)

- Born: 19 May 1992 (age 34) Parma, Italy
- Height: 1.80 m (5 ft 11 in)
- Weight: 83 kg (183 lb; 13 st 1 lb)

Rugby union career
- Position: Fullback
- Current team: Valorugby Emilia
Senior career
Years	Team	Apps	(Points)
2011−2013	Crociati Parma	36	(61)
2013−2014	Rugby Reggio	20	(131)
2014−2015	Rovigo Delta	17	(60)
2015−	Valorugby Emilia		
- Correct as of 22 November 2020
- Correct as of 22 November 2020

Davide Farolini (born 19 May 1992 in Parma) is an Italian rugby union player. His usual position is as a Fullback and he currently plays for Valorugby Emilia in Top12.
