= St Ives School (academy) =

Location
- Higher Tregenna; St Ives, Cornwall, TR26 2BB; England; 50.20162°N 5.48034°W

Information
- Type: Academy
- Department for Education URN: 140675 Tables
- Ofsted: Reports
- Head teacher: Simon Horner
- Gender: Mixed
- Age: 11 to 16
- Houses: Tan; Dowr; Ayr; Norves
- Website: www.st-ives.cornwall.sch.uk

St Ives School is a coeducational secondary school with academy status, located in St Ives, Cornwall, England.

== Barbara Hepworth ==
Notable sculptor Barbara Hepworth donated a copy of her 1965 work Oval Form (one of a limited edition of nine, about six inches across) for use as a prize.
