= Nicolas Garrault =

French rugby union player

- Born: Nicolas Garrault; 15 June 1991 (age 35)
- Height: 1.95 m (6 ft 5 in)
- Weight: 108 kg (17 st 0 lb)

Rugby union career
- Position: Back row
Senior career
Years	Team	Apps	(Points)
2012-15	Stade Français	32	(20)
2015-16	Tarbes Pyrenees Rugby	27	(15)
2016-	Stade Montois	77	(10)
- Correct as of 29 December 2019

Nicolas Garrault (born 15 June 1991) is a French rugby union player. He currently plays at back row for Stade Montois in the Rugby Pro D2.
