= Mathieu Nicolas =

French rugby union player

- Born: 11 February 1987 (age 39) Valence, Drôme, France
- Height: 1.80 m (5 ft 11 in)
- Weight: 83 kg (13 st 1 lb)

Rugby union career
- Position: Wing
Senior career
| Years | Team | Apps | (Points) |
| 2005–2009 | Bourgoin-Jallieu | 61 | (55) |
| 2009–2012 | Castres Olympique | 31 | (30) |
| 2012– | FC Grenoble | 6 | (10) |
- Correct as of 6 December 2012

Mathieu Nicolas (born 11 February 1987) is a French rugby union player. He has played on the wing, most recently for FC Grenoble in the Top 14. He began his career with Bourgoin before moving to Castres in 2009. He moved to FC Grenoble in the summer of 2012.
