= Daniel Yakopo =

Rotuman Australians rugby union player (born 1988)

- Born: Daniel Rudolph Yakopo; 29 June 1988 (age 38)
- Height: 1.82 m (5 ft 11 1/2 in)
- Weight: 114 kg (251 lb; 17 st 13 lb)

Rugby union career
- Position(s): Wing, Centre
Amateur team(s)
Years	Team	Apps	(Points)
2010	Brumbies Academy		
2015	Box Hill Rugby		
Senior career
Years	Team	Apps	(Points)
2013	Viadana		
Provincial / State sides
Years	Team	Apps	(Points)
- Parramatta
-	Tuggeranong Vikings		
National sevens team
Years	Team		Comps
2010-	Australia 7s		

Daniel Rudolph Yakopo (born 29 June 1988), known as "Dan", is an Rotuman Australians rugby union player. He played for the Australia 7sn sevens team and made his debut at the 2010 England Sevens where Australia defeated South Africa 7s in the final 19–14. Yakopo returned from injury to play at the 2012 Wellington Sevens. He is currently coach of the Carey Baptist Grammar School First XV, who won the premiership in 2016.

Yakopo played for the Parramatta Two Blues in the Shute Shield. He previously played for the Tuggeranong Vikings.

His father is Rotuman from Malhaha. He has four siblings; three sisters and a brother.

Yakopo is also the co-founder of emerging Australasian sports supplies and medical brand Vosota Med, together with his cousin Tomu Mataika.
