= Cédric Beal =

French rugby union player

- Born: 17 October 1986 (age 40) Orange, France
- Height: 1.9 m (6 ft 3 in)
- Weight: 106 kg (234 lb)

Rugby union career
- Position: Flanker/Number 8
Amateur team(s)
Years	Team	Apps	(Points)
1992–2002	Châtorange		
2002–2005	Toulon		
Senior career
Years	Team	Apps	(Points)
2005–2010	Toulon	22	(5)
2010–2013	Dax	77	(40)
2013–2014	Grenoble	13	(15)
2014–2016	Mont-de-Marsan	30	(25)
2016–2019	Provence	35	(15)
- Correct as of 19 August 2018
National sevens team
Years	Team		Comps
- France 7s

Cédric Béal (born 17 October 1986) is a retired French rugby union and sevens player who played as a Flanker for RC Toulonnais, Grenoble, Dax, Provence and Mont-de-Marsan. (1.90 m, 106 kg), now working as the CDF coach at Lyon.

== Honours ==
=== Club ===
- Pro D2 Champions : 2008
- Semi-finalist in the championnat de France Espoirs : 2006
- Finaliste of the championnat de France Reichel : 2005
- Champion of France in rugby sevens under 21
- Semi-Finalist in the FIRA Rugby Sevens European Championships

=== National team ===
- France rugby sevens (took part in the Georgia and Tunisia tournaments 2006 and Tunisia, Hong Kong and Adelaide 2007)
