= Christophe Loustalot =

French rugby union player

- Born: Christophe Loustalot; 7 April 1992 (age 34)
- Height: 1.69 m (5 ft 7 in)
- Weight: 76 kg (12 st 0 lb)

Rugby union career
- Position: Scrum-half
Senior career
Years	Team	Apps	(Points)
2013-15	Bayonne	29	(46)
2015-16	FC Grenoble	15	(3)
2016-	Mont-de-Marsan	200	(628)
- Correct as of 29 December 2019

Christophe Loustalot (born 7 April 1992) is a French professional rugby union player. He plays at scrum-half for Mont-de-Marsan, having previously played for Bayonne in the Top 14.
