= Niccolò Fadalti =

- Full name: Luigi Niccolò Fadalti
- Born: 17 October 1988 (age 38) Treviso, Italy
- Height: 1.72 m (5 ft 8 in)
- Weight: 80 kg (176 lb; 12 st 8 lb)

Rugby union career
- Position: Fullback
- Current team: Mogliano
Senior career
Years	Team	Apps	(Points)
2009−2010	Venezia Mestre	11	(5)
2010−2014	Mogliano	65	(582)
2017−2021	Petrarca Padova	87	(403)
2021−2024	Mogliano	33	(158)
- Correct as of 21 June 2020
International career
Years	Team	Apps	(Points)
2013−2020	Italy Sevens	163	(990)
- Correct as of 21 June 2020
Coaching career
- Years: Team
- 2023−: Mogliano (Assistant Coach)

Luigi Niccolò Fadalti (born 17 October 1988 in Treviso) was an Italian rugby union player. His usual position was as a Fullback and he played for Mogliano in Top10. From 2023, he is also Assistant Coach for Mogliano.

From 2013 he is part of the Italy Sevens squad also to participate at the Qualifying Tournament for the 2020 Summer Olympics and the 2020 World Rugby Sevens Challenger Series.
