= Jordan Michallet =

French rugby union player (1993–2022)

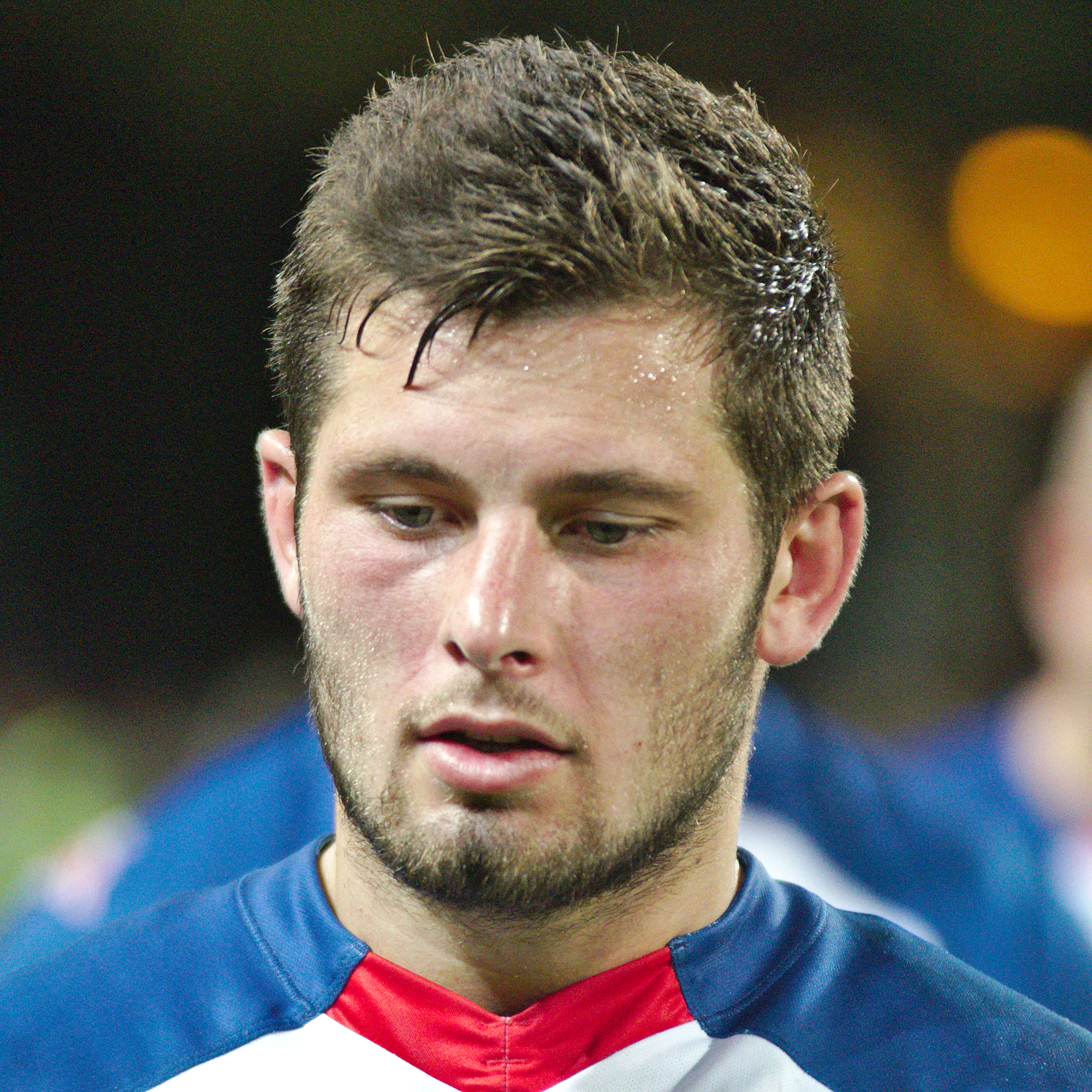
- Michallet in 2014
- Born: 10 January 1993 Voiron, France
- Died: 18 January 2022 (aged 29) Rouen, France
- Height: 1.80 m (5 ft 11 in)

Rugby union career
- Position: Fly-half
Youth career
- ?–2007: SO Voiron
- 2007–2013: FC Grenoble
Senior career
Years	Team	Apps	(Points)
2013–2015	FC Grenoble	17	(27)
2015–2017	CS Bourgoin-Jallieu	27	(63)
2017–2018	RC Strasbourg	20	(155)
2018–2022	Rouen Normandie Rugby	78	(658)

Jordan Michallet (10 January 1993 – 18 January 2022) was a French rugby union player who played at the fly-half position.

== Biography ==
Born on 10 January 1993 in Voiron, Michallet began his junior career with SO Voiron and subsequently FC Grenoble. In 2013, he was a champion of the Coupe Frantz-Reichel with Grenoble in a victory over Lyon OU in which he scored all nine of the match's points. He joined Grenoble's senior team in the Top 14 the following season, playing his first match against Castres Olympique on 24 August 2013. For the 2015–16 season, he joined the Rugby Pro D2 team CS Bourgoin-Jallieu and stayed there for two years.

In 2017, Michallet joined the Fédérale 1 team RC Strasbourg. The following year, he joined Rouen Normandie Rugby, of the same division.

Michallet died of suicide in Rouen on 18 January 2022, at the age of 29.

== Awards ==
- Winner of the Coupe Frantz-Reichel (2013)
- Champion of Fédérale 1 (2019)
