= Yann Lesgourgues =

France international rugby union player

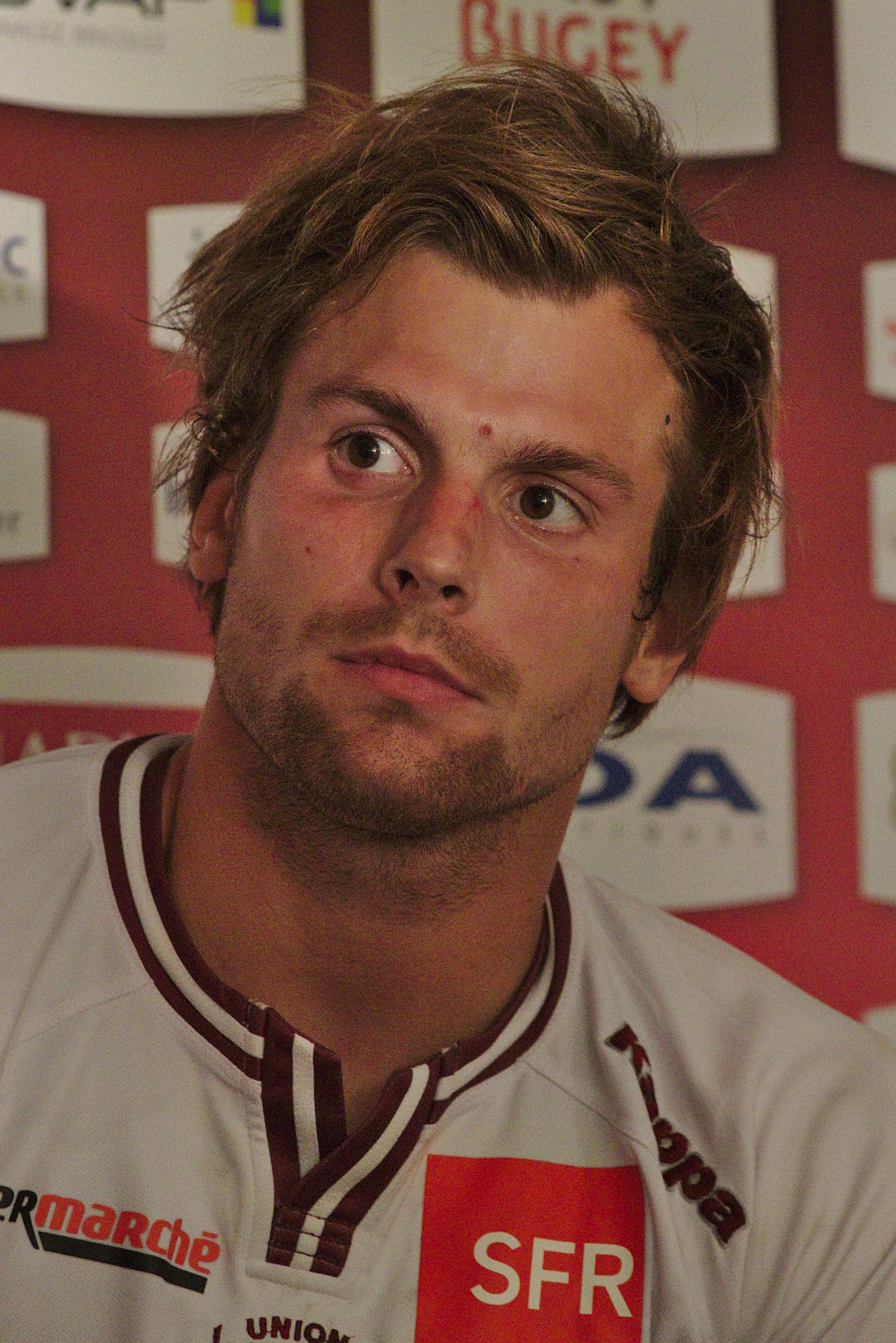
- Born: Yann Lesgourgues; 17 January 1991 (age 35) Bayonne, France
- Height: 1.75 m (5 ft 9 in)
- Weight: 77 kg (12 st 2 lb)

Rugby union career
- Position: Scrum-half
- Current team: Bordeaux Bègles
Senior career
| Years | Team | Apps | (Points) |
| 2009–2014 | Biarritz | 85 | (58) |
| 2014– | Bordeaux Bègles | 208 | (200) |
- Correct as of 4 July 2023
International career
| Years | Team | Apps | (Points) |
| 2011 | France U20 | | |
| 2017 | France | 1 | (0) |
- Correct as of 4 July 2023

Yann Lesgourgues (born 17 January 1991) is a French rugby union footballer. He plays for Bordeaux Bègles.

He began his career at Biarritz making his debut in 2009. In 2014 he moved to rival Top14 side Bordeaux Begles. In 2017 he made his debut for the France national team, starting in a test match against the All Blacks.

== Honours ==
Biarritz

- European Challenge Cup, 2012
