= James Hart (rugby union) =

Irish rugby union player

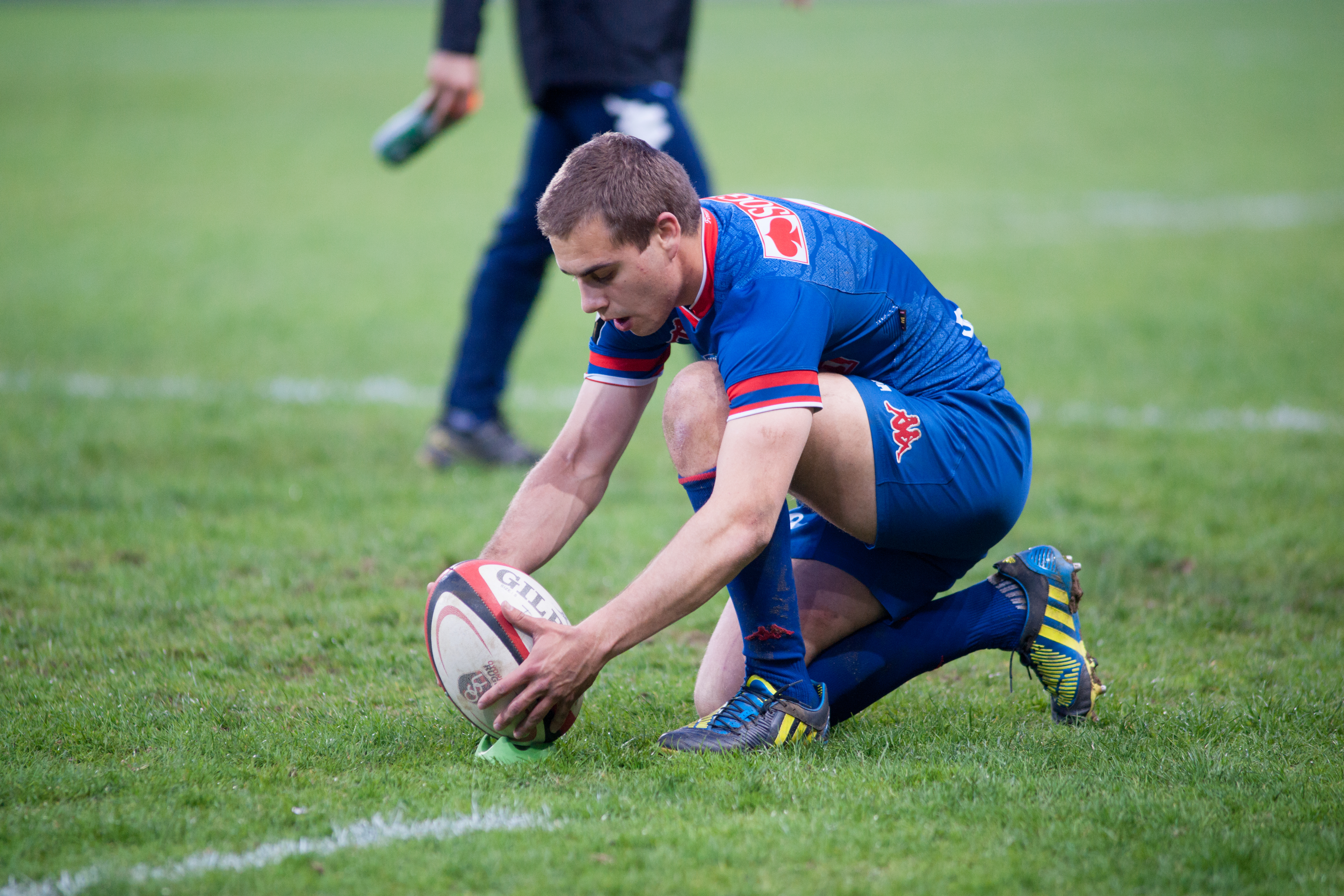
- Born: James Hart; 28 July 1991 (age 35) Dublin, Ireland
- Height: 1.78 m (5 ft 10 in)
- Weight: 82 kg (12.9 st; 181 lb)
- School: Belvedere College

Rugby union career
- Position: Scrum-half
Amateur team(s)
Years	Team	Apps	(Points)
- Clontarf
Senior career
Years	Team	Apps	(Points)
2011–2016	Grenoble	64	(274)
2016–2017	Racing 92	19	(63)
2017–2019	Munster	16	(10)
2019–	Biarritz	30	(99)
- Correct as of 25 September 2021

James Hart (born 28 July 1991) is an Irish rugby union player who currently plays for French Rugby Pro D2 side Biarritz. He plays as a scrum-half.

== Career ==
Son of an Irish father and French mother, Hart grew up playing amateur rugby in Dublin for Clontarf FC and also spent some time with grandparents in Toulouse, an area with a strong rugby culture. In 2011, he accepted a trial invitation from French Rugby Pro D2 side Grenoble, where ex-Leinster player Bernard Jackman was a coach, and earned a place in the club's academy. He played his first game for the club against London Welsh. After 5 seasons with Grenoble, Hart moved to another Top 14 club, Racing 92.

On 24 January 2017, it was announced that Hart would be joining Irish province Munster on a two-year contract, beginning at the conclusion of the 2016–17 season. Hart made his competitive debut for Munster on 1 September 2017, coming off the bench against Benetton in Round 1 of the 2017–18 Pro14. He made his first start for Munster on 26 November 2017, doing so against Zebre and scoring his first try for the province in their 36–19 away victory.

Hart left Munster at the end of the 2018–19 season, to return to French rugby and join Biarritz ahead of the 2019–20 season.
