= Matthew Pewtner =

- Born: Matthew Pewtner; 26 December 1990 (age 35) Newport, Wales
- Height: 191 cm (6 ft 3 in)
- Weight: 106 kg (16 st 10 lb)
- Occupation: Teacher in GWA

Rugby union career
Senior career
Years	Team	Apps	(Points)
2009–2017	NG Dragons	72	(60)
- Correct as of 17 Feb 2016
International career
Years	Team	Apps	(Points)
2009–10	Wales U20		

Matthew Pewtner (born 26 December 1990) is a Welsh rugby union player for Newport RFC and the Newport Gwent Dragons regional team. A winger, he has represented his country in the 15s and 7s formats of the game.

Pewtner previously played for Ystrad Mynach RFC, Blackwood RFC, Cross Keys RFC, and the Newport Gwent Dragons Under-20 regional team. He made his debut for the Newport Gwent Dragons versus Sale Sharks on 6 November 2009 as a second-half replacement.

On 22 December 2009 he was named in the Wales Under 20 Squad for the 2010 Under-20 Six Nations tournament.

‘Pewts’ led a prolific career, becoming prominent at both the top level of rugby sevens and rugby union. A dangerous runner with the ball and an efficient defender, he was renowned for his physical attributes which translated to the rugby field. His 10m time is rumoured to be the fastest recorded time of any professional rugby player.

Pewtner was born in Newport, Wales and retired from rugby aged 25 in February 2016 due to a concussion injury.

His career was cut short at a time when he was coming into the prime of his career.
