= Myles Dorrian =

- Born: Myles Andrew Dorrian; 26 November 1982 (age 43) Wollongong, New South Wales, Australia
- Height: 1.85 m (6 ft 1 in)
- Weight: 88 kg (13 st 12 lb)

Rugby union career
- Position(s): Fly-half, Centre, Full Back
Senior career
Years	Team	Apps	(Points)
2006–2009	Coventry RFC		
2009–2011	Bedford Blues		
2011–2013	Exeter Chiefs		
2013–2015	London Irish		
2015–	Bedford Blues		

Myles Andrew Dorrian (born 26 November 1982) is an Australian rugby union player for London Irish in the Aviva Premiership. He has previously played for Bedford Blues and Coventry. Myles made his debut for Exeter against Welsh side Ospreys on 15 October 2011.

Myles position of choice is Fly-half but he can also play at Centre and Full Back

It was announced on 15 April 2013 that Myles would be joining London Irish on a two-year deal. On 16 May 2015, Dorrian returned to Bedford Blues in the RFU Championship from the 2015–16 season.
