= List of 2013–14 Top 14 transfers =

This is a list of transfers involving Top 14 teams between the end of the 2012–13 season and the end of the 2013–14 season. Top 14 is the highest French rugby union league.

== Bayonne ==
=== Players In ===
- (South Africa) Gert Muller from (France) SU Agen
- (South Africa) JC Janse van Rensburg from (South Africa) Lions
- (Tonga) Lisiate Faʻaoso from (France) SU Agen
- (France) Jean Monribot from (France) SU Agen
- (Tonga) Opeti Fonua from (France) SU Agen
- (France) Mathieu Bélie from (France) Racing Metro
- (New Zealand) Stephen Brett from (Japan) Toyota Verblitz
- (Fiji) Saimoni Vaka from (France) SU Agen
- (Argentina) Martin Bustos Moyano from (France) Montpellier

=== Players Out ===
- (France) Renaud Boyoud to (France) US Dax
- (France) Walter Desmaison to (France) Racing Metro
- (New Zealand) Matt Graham to (France) Union Bordeaux-Bègles
- (South Africa) Rob Linde retired
- (France) François Carillo retired
- (France) Marc Baget to (France) Béziers
- (France) Cédric Garcia to (France) Castres Olympique
- (France) Benjamin Boyet released
- (South Africa) Jacques-Louis Potgieter to (France) US Dax
- (France) Thibault Lacroix to (France) Union Bordeaux-Bègles
- (France) Lionel Mazars to (France) SU Agen
- (France) Thibault Visensang to (France) SC Albi
- (France) Cédric Heymans retired
- (Wales) Mike Phillips to (France) Racing Metro

== Biarritz ==
=== Players In ===
- (France) Alexandre Menini from (France) Stade Montois
- (Italy) Joshua Furno from (France) RC Narbonne
- (England) Addison Lockley from (England) Moseley
- (Tonga) Ueleni Fono from (France) SU Agen
- (New Zealand) Daniel Waenga from (New Zealand) Hawke's Bay Magpies
- (Italy) Giovanni Cipriani from (Italy) Viadana
- Paul Perez from Samoa Sevens
- (South Africa) Joe Pietersen from (South Africa) Stormers

=== Players Out ===
- (France) Benoît August retired
- (France) Jérôme Thion retired
- (France) Wenceslas Lauret to (France) Racing Metro
- (Australia) Talalelei Grey to (Australia) Waratahs
- (France) Jean-Pascal Barraque to (France) Toulouse
- (Argentina) Marcelo Bosch to (England) Saracens
- (Australia) Dane Haylett-Petty to (Australia) Western Force

== Bordeaux ==
=== Players In ===
- (France) Jean-Baptiste Poux from (France) Toulouse
- (Samoa) Benjamin Sa from (France) Racing Metro
- (France) Clément Maynadier from (France) SC Albi
- (Spain) Beñat Auzqui from (France) US Tyrosse
- (France) Jean-Charles Fidinde from (France) Clermont Auvergne
- (France) Aliki Fakate from (France) Montpellier
- (New Zealand) Matt Graham from (France) Bayonne
- (South Africa) Jandré Marais from (South Africa) Sharks
- (France) Jean-Blaise Lespinasse from (France) US Montauban
- (France) Marco Tauleigne from (France) CS Bourgoin-Jallieu
- (Samoa) Taiasina Tuifu'a from (England) Newcastle Falcons
- (Australia) Poutasi Luafutu from (France) CA Brive
- (France) Pierre Bernard from (France) Castres Olympique
- (France) Romain Lonca from (France) Stade Hendayais
- (France) Thibault Lacroix from (France) Bayonne
- (France) Gilen Queheille from (France) SA Mauléon
- Robert Lilomaiava from Samoa Sevens
- (France) Jean-Baptiste Peyras-Loustalet from (France) Béziers

=== Players Out ===
- (New Zealand) Hikairo Forbes to (France) La Rochelle
- (Samoa) Tamato Leupolu to (France) CA Brive
- (France) Nicolas Decamps to (France) Section Paloise
- (France) Yassin Boutemane to (France) US Dax
- (France) Franck Labbé retired
- (France) Stephane Fort to (France) Avenir Castanéen Rugby
- (France) François Tisseau to (France) US Carcassonne
- (France) Andrew Chauveau to (France) RC Narbonne
- (Australia) Justin Purll to (France) USA Perpignan
- (France) Damien Larrieu to (France) FC Auch Gers
- (France) Julien Seron to (France) US Carcassonne
- (France) Camille Lopez to (France) USA Perpignan
- (Tonga) Andrew Maʻilei to (France) CA Brive
- (France) Michel Denetre to (France) CS Bourgoin-Jallieu
- (Fiji) Avenisi Vasuinubu to (France) US Colomiers
- (France) Thierry Brana to (France) US Carcassonne
- (New Zealand) Lachie Munro to (France) Lyon

== Brive ==
=== Players In ===
- (South Africa) Kevin Buys from (South Africa) Southern Kings
- (Samoa) Tamato Leupolu from (France) Union Bordeaux-Bègles
- (Georgia (country)) Karlen Asieshvili from (France) Stade Aurillacois
- (France) Simon Pinet from (France) Stade Aurillacois
- (France) Fabien Laurent from (France) Oyonnax
- (Wales) Kieran Murphy from (Wales) Scarlets
- (Fiji) Sisa Koyamaibole from (France) Union Athlétique Libournaise
- (France) Damien Neveu from (France) La Rochelle
- (France) Thomas Sanchou from (France) Castres Olympique
- (Tonga) Andrew Maʻilei from (France) Union Bordeaux-Bègles
- (Tonga) Alfi Mafi from (Australia) Western Force
- (Fiji) Venione Voretamaya from (France) SC Albi
- (France) Gaëtan Germain from (France) Racing Metro

=== Players Out ===
- (Georgia (country)) Davit Khinchagishvili to (France) Racing Metro
- (Georgia (country)) Irakli Natriashvili released
- (France) Alexandre Barozzi released
- (Argentina) Pablo Henn to (France) Limoges
- (South Africa) Pat Barnard released
- (France) Quentin Viozelange to (France) US Colomiers
- (South Africa) Retief Uys retired
- (France) Simon Azoulai to (France) SC Tulle
- (Australia) Poutasi Luafutu to (France) Union Bordeaux-Bègles
- (Scotland) Mike Blair to (England) Newcastle Falcons
- (France) Benjamin Caminati to (France) FC Auch Gers
- (England) Jamie Noon to (France) SC Tulle
- (France) Yann Fior retired
- (France) Jacques Boussuge released
- (France) Julien Caminati to (France) FC Grenoble
- (France) Léo Griffoul released

== Castres ==
=== Players In ===
- (South Africa) George Marich from (France) RC Narbonne
- (Scotland) Richie Gray from (England) Sale Sharks
- (France) Julien Tomas from (France) Montpellier
- (Spain) Cédric Garcia from (France) Bayonne
- (Argentina) Santiago Fernandez from (France) Montpellier
- (France) Rémy Grosso from (France) Lyon
- (France) Geoffrey Palis from (France) SC Albi

=== Players Out ===
- (France) Adrien Pélissié to (France) Stade Aurillacois
- (Samoa) Iosefa Tekori to (France) Toulouse
- (France) Matthias Rolland retired
- (South Africa) Wessel Jooste to (France) SU Agen
- (France) Thierry Lacrampe to (France) Clermont Auvergne
- (France) Pierre Bernard to (France) Union Bordeaux-Bègles
- (France) Thomas Sanchou to (France) CA Brive
- (France) Florian Vialelle to (France) SC Albi
- (France) Marc Andreu to (France) Racing Metro
- (France) Brice Trevisan to (France) Avenir Castanéen Rugby

== Clermont ==
=== Players In ===
- (France) Thierry Lacrampe from (France) Castres Olympique
- (South Africa) Gavin Hume from (France) USA Perpignan

=== Players Out ===
- (France) Kevin Boudot to (France) US Bressane
- (France) Mike Corbel to (France) La Rochelle
- (France) Anthony Maury to (France) USO Nivernaise
- (France) Jean-Charles Fidinde to (France) Union Bordeaux-Bègles
- (France) Baptiste Hézard to (France) Stade Aurillacois
- (Canada) Cameron Pierce to (France) Section Paloise
- (France) Loann Goujon to (France) La Rochelle
- (Georgia (country)) Viktor Kolelishvili to (France) Lyon
- (France) Hugues Bastide to (France) USO Nevers
- (New Zealand) Kevin Senio to (France) Montluçon
- (France) Nicolas Vuillemin to (France) Oyonnax
- (France) David Skrela to (France) US Colomiers
- (France) Alexandre Mourot to (France) Lyon
- (France) Pierre Santalier to (France) La Rochelle
- (Fiji) Kini Murimurivalu to (France) La Rochelle
- (France) Anthony Floch to (France) Montpellier

== Grenoble ==
=== Players In ===
- (Australia) Dan Palmer from (Australia) Brumbies
- (France) Richard Choirat from (France) Section Paloise
- (South Africa) Hendrik Roodt from (South Africa) Lions
- (Australia) Peter Kimlin from (Australia) Brumbies
- (France) Cédric Béal from (France) US Dax
- (France) Nicolas Bézy from (France) Stade Français
- (France) Mathieu Lorée from (France) SU Agen
- (England) Olly Barkley from (France) Racing Metro
- (France) Geoffroy Messina from (France) Toulon
- (Fiji) Ratu Alipate Raitini from (Australia) Cronulla Sharks
- (France) Julien Caminati from (France) CA Brive
- (France) Benjamin Thiery from (France) Montpellier

=== Players Out ===
- (France) Erwan Iaptef to (France) Oyonnax
- (South Africa) Ruaan du Preez to (France) Oyonnax
- (Australia) Lotu Tokeihao to (France) Stade Aurillacois
- (France) Karim Kouider to (France) US Carcassonne
- (France) Florent Fourcade to (France) SC Albi
- (France) Alexandre Pollard released
- (France) Jonathan Pélissié to (France) Montpellier
- (France) Clément Darbo to (France) SU Agen
- (France) Nicolas Laharrague to (France) Tarbes
- (Fiji) Aloisio Butonidualevu to (France) US Carcassonne
- (New Zealand) Aaron Bancroft to (France) US Carcassonne
- (France) Lucas Dupont to (France) Montpellier
- (Fiji) Viliame Waqaseduadua to (France) SU Agen
- (Argentina) Joaquin Tuculet to (France) Union Bordeaux Begles
- (France) Pierre-Yves Montagnat released

== Montpellier ==
=== Players In ===
- (France) Nicolas Mas from (France) USA Perpignan
- (France) Mickaël Ivaldi from (France) Toulon
- (France) Thomas Bianchin from (France) Racing Metro
- (Australia) Sitaleki Timani from (Australia) Waratahs
- (Cameroon) Robins Tchale-Watchou from (France) USA Perpignan
- (Scotland) Jim Hamilton from (England) Gloucester Rugby
- (France) Jonathan Pélissié from (France) Grenoble
- (South Africa) Wynand Olivier from (South Africa) Bulls
- (South Africa) JP du Plessis from (South Africa) Stormers
- (New Zealand) Hamish Gard from (Japan) NTT DoCoMo Red Hurricanes
- (New Zealand) Anthony Tuitavake from (Japan) NEC Green Rockets
- (New Zealand) Rene Ranger from (New Zealand) Blues
- (France) Lucas Dupont from (France) Grenoble
- (France) Anthony Floch from (France) Clermont Auvergne

=== Players Out ===
- (Georgia (country)) Giorgi Jgenti to (France) USA Perpignan
- (France) Kevin Kervarec to (France) Béziers
- (France) Wilfried Hounkpatin to (France) RC Narbonne
- (France) Vincent Pelo to (France) Bourgoin
- (France) Fabien Dorey to (France) RC Aubenas
- (Argentina) Agustin Creevy to (England) Worcester Warriors
- (South Africa) Rassie Jansen van Vuuren to (France) La Rochelle
- (France) Mickaël Ladhuie to (France) US Montauban
- (South Africa) Drikus Hancke retired
- (France) Aliki Fakate to (France) Union Bordeaux-Bègles
- (France) Rémy Martin to (France) Béziers
- (France) Julien Tomas to (France) Castres Olympique
- (Argentina) Santiago Fernandez to (France) Castres Olympique
- (South Africa) Paul Bosch to (France) USO Nevers
- (New Zealand) Taleta Tupuola to (France) US Montauban
- (England) Shontayne Hape released
- (Australia) Matthew Carraro to (Australia) Waratahs
- (Argentina) Martin Bustos Moyano to (France) Bayonne
- (Argentina) Lucas González Amorosino to (France) Oyonnax
- (France) Benjamin Thiery to (France) Grenoble

== Oyonnax ==
=== Players In ===
- (France) Erwan Iaptef from (France) Grenoble
- (South Africa) Ruaan du Preez from (France) Grenoble
- (England) Neil Clark from (England) Exeter Chiefs
- (Ireland) Damian Browne from (Ireland) Leinster
- (France) Damien Lagrange from (France) SU Agen
- (Tonga) Viliami Maʻafu unattached
- (France) Fabien Cibray from (France) Lyon
- (Argentina) Agustin Figuerola from (France) CA Brive
- (France) Nicolas Vuillemin from (France) Clermont Auvergne
- (South Africa) Conrad Barnard from (France) SU Agen
- (France) Pierre Aguillon from (France) US Carcassonne
- (France) Guillaume Bousses from (France) Racing Metro
- (France) Dug Codjo from (France) US Carcassonne
- (France) Jean-François Coux from (France) SU Agen
- (Ivory Coast) Silvère Tian from (France) SU Agen

=== Players Out ===
- (France) Yann Resseguier to (France) Bourgoin
- (South Africa) Jan Volschenk released
- (France) Cyril Blanchard to (France) AS Mâcon
- (Australia) Valeni Tiatia released
- (France) Fabien Laurent to (France) CA Brive
- (France) Quentin Witt to (France) US Bressane
- (France) Julien Audy to (France) La Rochelle
- (France) Etienne Ninet to (France) US Annecy
- (France) Antoine Renaud to (France) Stade Aurillacois
- (France) Romain Boscus to (France) Stade Rodez
- (France) Jean-Emmanuel Cassin to (France) US Bressane
- (Australia) Lole Tualaulelei released
- (France) Jérémy Aicardi to (France) Bourgoin
- (France) Quentin Nauroy to (France) Saint-Estève XIII

== Perpignan ==
=== Players In ===
- (Romania) Paulică Ion from (England) London Welsh
- (Georgia (country)) Giorgi Jgenti from (France) Montpellier
- (Australia) Justin Purll from (France) Union Bordeaux-Bègles
- (France) Karl Château from (France) Toulouse
- (South Africa) Dewaldt Duvenage from (South Africa) Stormers
- (France) Camille Lopez from (France) Union Bordeaux-Bègles
- (Italy) Tommaso Allan unattached
- (Italy) Tommaso Benvenuti from (Italy) Benetton Treviso
- (Fiji) Watisoni Votu from (England) Exeter Chiefs
- (South Africa) Wandile Mjekevu from (South Africa) Sharks

=== Players Out ===
- (France) Nicolas Mas to (France) Montpellier
- (France) Jérôme Schuster to (England) Leicester Tigers
- (France) Jérémy Castex to (France) Lyon
- (France) Maxime Delonca to (France) US Dax
- (Cameroon) Robins Tchale-Watchou to (France) Montpellier
- (France) Yohan Vivalda to (France) US Colomiers
- (France) Romain Bézian to (France) Tarbes
- (France) Gilles Arnaudiès to (France) RC Narbonne
- (Samoa) Henry Tuilagi retired
- (France) David Mélé to (England) Leicester Tigers
- (France) Gilles Bosch to (France) US Carcassonne
- (South Africa) Gavin Hume to (France) Clermont Auvergne
- (France) Fabrice Catala to (France) US Colomiers
- (France) Adrien Planté to (France) Racing Metro
- (France) Armand Battle to (France) US Colomiers
- (France) Farid Sid to (France) Lézignan Sangliers

== Racing Métro ==
=== Players In ===
- (Tonga) Soane Tongaʻuiha from (England) Northampton Saints
- (South Africa) Brian Mujati from (France) Northampton Saints
- (France) Walter Desmaison from (France) Bayonne
- (Georgia (country)) Davit Khinchagishvili from (France) CA Brive
- (France) Virgile Lacombe from (South Africa) Southern Kings
- (South Africa) Juandré Kruger from (South Africa) Bulls
- (France) Wenceslas Lauret from (France) Biarritz Olympique
- (Wales) Dan Lydiate from (Wales) Newport Gwent Dragons
- (France) Laurent Magnaval from (France) Stade Montois
- (Ireland) Johnny Sexton from (Ireland) Leinster
- (Wales) Jamie Roberts from (Wales) Cardiff Blues
- (France) Marc Andreu from (France) Castres Olympique
- (France) Adrien Planté from (France) USA Perpignan
- (France) Benjamin Lapeyre from (France) Toulon

=== Players Out ===
- (Samoa) Benjamin Sa to (France) Union Bordeaux Bègles
- (Argentina) Juan Pablo Orlandi to (England) Bath Rugby
- (Italy) Andrea Lo Cicero retired
- (France) Mikaele Tuugahala retired
- (France) Thomas Bianchin to (France) Montpellier
- (France) Benjamin Noirot to (France) Toulon
- (Italy) Santiago Dellapè retired
- (France) Julien Côme to (France) FC Auch Gers
- (Argentina) Álvaro Galindo released
- (New Zealand) Johnny Leo'o to (France) Lille Métropole Rugby
- (France) Mathieu Bélie to (France) Bayonne
- (England) Olly Barkley to (France) Grenoble
- (France) Guillaume Boussès to (France) Oyonnax
- (Italy) Mirco Bergamasco to (Italy) Rugby Rovigo Delta
- (Fiji) Albert Vulivuli to (France) La Rochelle
- Julien Jane to France Sevens
- Julien Saubade to France Sevens
- (Fiji) Sireli Bobo to (Japan) NTT DoCoMo Red Hurricanes
- (France) Gaëtan Germain to (France) CA Brive

== Stade Français ==
=== Players In ===
- (South Africa) Heinke van der Merwe from (Ireland) Leinster
- (Samoa) Sakaria Taulafo from (England) London Wasps
- (Georgia (country)) Davit Kubriashvili from (France) Toulon
- (France) Sylvain Nicolas from (France) Toulouse
- (Australia) Richard Kingi from (Australia) Melbourne Rebels
- (South Africa) Morné Steyn from (South Africa) Bulls
- (France) Meyer Bosman from (South Africa) Sharks
- (Fiji) Andrea Cocagi from (Italy) L'Aquila
- (Australia) Digby Ioane from (Australia) Reds
- (Australia) Marty Ioane unattached

=== Players Out ===
- (Argentina) Tetaz Chaparro to (Wales) Newport Gwent Dragons
- (Cook Islands) Stan Wright released
- (France) Jérémy Bécasseau to (England) Worcester Warriors
- (Tonga) Lei Tomiki to (France) RC Narbonne
- (France) Arthur Chollon to (France) US Dax
- (France) Nicolas Bezy to (France) Grenoble
- (Argentina) Felipe Contepomi retired
- (Australia) Paul Warwick to (England) Worcester Warriors
- (Australia) Morgan Turinui to (France) Lille Métropole Rugby
- (Samoa) Gavin Williams to (France) Montluçon
- (England) Paul Sackey to (England) Harlequins
- (Australia) Francis Fainifo released

== Toulon ==
=== Players In ===
- (France) Emmanuel Felsina from (France) Aix-en-Provence
- (Italy) Martin Castrogiovanni from (England) Leicester Tigers
- (France) Benjamin Noirot from (France) Racing Metro
- (New Zealand) Ali Williams from (New Zealand) Blues
- (Argentina) Facundo Isa unattached
- (South Africa) Michael Claassens from (England) Bath Rugby
- (South Africa) Bryan Habana from (South Africa) Stormers
- (Australia) Drew Mitchell from (Australia) Waratahs
- Joshua Tuisova from Fiji Sevens

=== Players Out ===
- (Wales) Gethin Jenkins to (Wales) Cardiff Blues
- (Georgia (country)) Davit Kubriashvili to (France) Stade Français Paris
- (France) Mickaël Ivaldi to (France) Montpellier
- (England) Simon Shaw released
- (France) Romain Manchia to (France) RC Narbonne
- (France) Etienne Herjean to (France) RC Narbonne
- (France) Geoffroy Messina to (France) Grenoble
- (France) Benjamin Lapeyre to (France) Racing Metro

== Toulouse ==
=== Players In ===
- (South Africa) Chiliboy Ralepelle from (South Africa) Bulls
- (Samoa) Iosefa Tekori from (France) Castres Olympique -
- (France) Yacouba Camara from (France) RC Massy
- (South Africa) Jano Vermaak from (South Africa) Bulls
- (France) Jean-Pascal Barraque from (France) Biarritz Olympique
- (New Zealand) Hosea Gear from (New Zealand) Highlanders

=== Players Out ===
- (France) Jean Baptiste Poux to (France) Union Bordeaux Bègles
- (South Africa) Gary Botha released
- (France) William Servat retired
- (France) Cyril Deligny to (France) RC Narbonne
- (France) Russlan Boukerou to (France) FC Auch Gers
- (France) Jean Bouilhou to (France) Section Paloise
- (France) Karl Château to (France) USA Perpignan
- (France) Sylvain Nicolas to (France) Stade Français
- (Australia) Luke Burgess to (Australia) Melbourne Rebels
- (France) Yannick Jauzion retired
- (France) Maxime Payen to (France) SC Albi
