= List of 2015–16 Top 14 transfers =

This is a list of player transfers involving Top 14 teams before or during the 2015–16 season. The list is of deals that are confirmed and are either from or to a rugby union team in the Top 14 during the 2014–15 season. It is not unknown for confirmed deals to be cancelled at a later date.

== Agen ==
=== Players In ===
- (France) Benoit Sicart from (France) Montpellier
- (Portugal) Mike Tadjer from (France) Massy
- (Argentina) Bautista Guemes from (Argentina) Club Universitario de Buenos Aires
- (South Africa) Ruaan du Preez from (France) Oyonnax
- (Fiji) Api Naikatini from (New Zealand) Wellington Lions
- (Fiji) Ropate Ratu from (France) Aurillac
- (France) Corentin Braendlin from (France) Toulon
- (South Africa) Johann Sadie from (South Africa) Cheetahs
- (France) Marc Bahet from (France) Béziers
- (France) Damien Fèvre from (France) Pau
- George Tilsley from New Zealand Sevens
- (Ireland) Dave Ryan from (Ireland) Ulster

=== Players Out ===
- (France) Benjamin Petre to (France) CA Brive
- (Georgia (country)) Tariel Ratianidze to (France) Mont-de–Marsan
- (France) Pierre Ferrary to (France) Auch
- (Tonga) Semisi Telefoni to (France) US Carcassonne
- (France) Lucas Tolot to (France) US Montauban
- (France) Loris Tolot to (France) US Montauban
- (France) Raphael Lagarde to (France) SC Albi
- (Chile) Sergio Valdes retired
- (Australia) Junior Pelesasa retired
- (South Africa) Wessel Jooste retired
- (Ireland) Denis Fogarty to (France) Provence
- (Argentina) Belisario Agulla to (England) Newcastle Falcons

== Bordeaux ==
=== Players In ===
- (France) Loann Goujon from (France) La Rochelle
- (New Zealand) Luke Braid from (New Zealand) Blues
- (Australia) Adam Ashley-Cooper from (Australia) NSW Waratahs
- (France) Jean-Marcelin Buttin from (France) Clermont Auvergne
- (France) Nans Ducuing from (France) USA Perpignan
- (Australia) Sekope Kepu from (Australia) NSW Waratahs
- (South Africa) Steven Kitshoff from (South Africa) Stormers
- (France) Jean-Baptiste Dubie from (France) Mont-de–Marsan
- (New Zealand) Peter Saili from (New Zealand) Blues

=== Players Out ===
- (South Africa) Ben Venter to (France) US Montauban
- (France) Bertrand Guiry to (France) Biarritz Olympique
- (Georgia (country)) Zaza Navrozashvili to (France) Lyon
- (Samoa) Taiasina Tuifu'a to (France) Lyon
- (South Africa) Ulrich Beyers to (Italy) Zebre
- (France) Laurent Delboubes to (France) Oyonnax
- (Samoa) Benjamin Sa retired

== Brive ==
=== Players In ===
- (France) Benjamin Petre from (France) SU Agen
- (France) Teddy Iribaren from (France) Montpellier
- (New Zealand) William Whetton from (France) Castres Olympique
- (South Africa) Joe Snyman from (Wales) Scarlets
- (France) Lucas Pointud from (France) Bayonne
- (France) Matthieu Ugalde from (France) Bayonne

=== Players Out ===
- (South Africa) Pat Barnard retired
- (France) Simon Pinet to (France) US Montauban
- (France) Olivier Caisso to (France) US Montauban
- (France) Damien Neveu to (France) US Colomiers
- (Wales) Kieran Murphy to (England) London Welsh
- (Fiji) Venione Voretamaya to (France) US Colomiers
- (France) Thomas Sanchou retired
- (France) Russlan Boukerou to (France) Tarbes
- (South Africa) Riaan Swanepoel to (France) US Montauban
- (Namibia) Aranos Coetzee to (South Africa) Free State Cheetahs

== Castres ==
=== Players In ===
- (Argentina) Benjamin Urdapilleta from (France) Oyonnax
- (New Zealand) Alex Tulou from (France) Montpellier
- (France) Alexandre Bias from (France) Montpellier
- (New Zealand) Rudi Wulf from (France) Toulon
- (France) Francois Fontaine from (France) Clermont Auvergne
- (Samoa) David Smith from (France) Toulon
- (France) Antoine Tichit from (France) Oyonnax
- (France) Julien Seron from (France) US Carcassonne
- (Argentina) Lucas Martinez from (Argentina) Lomas Athletic
- (New Zealand) Eric Sione from (New Zealand) Wellington Lions

=== Players Out ===
- (France) Rémi Talès to (France) Racing 92
- (New Zealand) William Whetton to (France) CA Brive
- (Argentina) Ramiro Herrera to (Argentina) Jaguares
- (Spain) Cedric Garcia to (France) US Montauban
- (England) Marcel Garvey to (France) Provence
- (France) Gregory Marmoiton to (France) Provence
- (New Zealand) Saimone Taumoepeau to (France) Provence
- (South Africa) Jannie Bornman to (France) Provence
- (Scotland) Max Evans to (France) Provence

== Clermont ==
=== Players In ===
- (Argentina) Patricio Fernandez from (Argentina) Jockey Club
- (France) Scott Spedding from (France) Bayonne
- (South Africa) Flip van der Merwe from (South Africa) Bulls
- (France) Camille Gérondeau from (France) Racing 92
- (France) Judicael Cancoriet from (France) RC Massy
- (Fiji) Albert Vulivuli from (France) Montpellier
- (Georgia (country)) Irakli Natriashvili from (France) SC Tulle
- (England) David Strettle from (England) Saracens
- (France) Adrien Planté from (France) Racing 92
- (New Zealand) Hosea Gear from (New Zealand) Chiefs

=== Players Out ===
- (France) Jean-Marcelin Buttin to (France) Bordeaux Bègles
- (France) Julien Malzieu to (France) Montpellier
- (France) Thierry Lacrampe to (France) Pau
- (New Zealand) Mike Delany to (England) Newcastle Falcons
- (Fiji) Uwa Tawalo to (France) Oyonnax
- (France) Julien Pierre to (France) Pau
- (France) Julien Bonnaire to (France) Lyon
- (New Zealand) Zac Guildford to (New Zealand) Hawke's Bay Magpies / (Australia) Waratahs
- (Fiji) Napolioni Nalaga to (France) Lyon
- (Samoa) Ti'i Paulo to (France) Lyon
- (Georgia (country)) Giorgi Sharashidze to (France) Aurillac
- (France) Francois Fontaine to (France) Castres Olympique

== Grenoble ==
=== Players In ===
- (France) Mathias Marie from (France) Biarritz Olympique
- (France) Lucas Dupont from (France) Montpellier
- (France) Walter Desmaison from (France) Racing 92
- (France) Gilles Bosch from (France) US Carcassonne
- (France) Fabrice Estebanez from (France) Lyon
- (England) James Percival from (England) Worcester Warriors
- (Cook Islands) Stephen Setephano from (Japan) NTT DoCoMo Red Hurricanes
- (France) Armand Battle from (France) US Colomiers
- (Tonga) Sona Taumalolo from (France) Racing 92
- (France) Christophe Loustalot from (France) Bayonne
- (South Africa) Rossouw de Klerk from (Scotland) Glasgow Warriors

=== Players Out ===
- (France) Richard Choirat to (France) Bayonne
- (France) Julien Caminati to (France) Toulon
- (France) Albertus Buckle to (France) Lyon
- (France) Florian Faure to (France) Bourgoin
- (France) Thibaut Rey to (France) Mont-de-Marsan
- (Tonga) Daniel Kilioni to (France) US Carcassonne
- (France) Rémy Hughes to (France) Mont-de-Marsan
- (South Africa) Paul Willemse to (France) Montpellier
- (France) Jordan Michallat to (France) Bourgoin
- (France) Geoffroy Messina retired
- (South Africa) Ross Skeate to (France) Provence
- (South Africa) Naude Beukes to (France) Bourgoin
- (France) Benjamin Thiery to (France) Bourgoin
- (Fiji) Alipate Ratini released

== La Rochelle ==
=== Players In ===
- (France) Pierre Aguillon from (France) Oyonnax
- (South Africa) Ricky Januarie from (France) Lyon
- (France) Maxime Gau from (France) SC Albi
- (France) Benjamin Lapeyre from (France) Racing 92
- (France) David Roumieu from (France) Bayonne
- (France) Damien Lagrange from (France) Oyonnax
- (France) Gabriel Lacroix from (France) SC Albi
- (Australia) Zack Holmes from (Australia) Western Force
- (New Zealand) David Raikuna from (New Zealand) North Harbour

=== Players Out ===
- (France) Loann Goujon to (France) Bordeaux Bègles
- (France) Jean-Philippe Grandclaude to (France) Leucate
- (France) Arthur Cestaro to (France) Provence
- (Belgium) Julien Berger to (France) Provence
- (New Zealand) Hamish Gard to (Japan) Mitsubishi Sagamihara DynaBoars
- (France) Benoit Bourrust retired
- (Italy) Gonzalo Canale to (France) Provence
- (Fiji) Sireli Bobo retired
- (South Africa) Peter Grant to (Australia) Western Force

== Montpellier ==
=== Players In ===
- (France) Marvin O'Connor from (France) Bayonne
- (Australia) Nic White from (Australia) Brumbies
- (Georgia (country)) Davit Kubriashvili from (France) Stade Français
- (South Africa) Demetri Catrakilis from (South Africa) Stormers
- (France) Julien Malzieu from (France) Clermont Auvergne
- (South Africa) Jacques du Plessis from (South Africa) Bulls
- (South Africa) Schalk van der Merwe from (South Africa) Lions
- (Australia) Jesse Mogg from (Australia) Brumbies
- (South Africa) Jacobie Adriaanse from (Wales) Scarlets
- (South Africa) Paul Willemse from (France) Grenoble
- (South Africa) Wiaan Liebenberg from (South Africa) Bulls
- (South Africa) Cameron Wright from (South Africa) Sharks
- (Fiji) Seveci Nakailagi unattached
- (South Africa) Pierre Spies from (South Africa) Bulls
- (South Africa) Bismarck du Plessis from (South Africa) Sharks
- (South Africa) Jannie du Plessis from (South Africa) Sharks
- (South Africa) CJ van der Linde from (South Africa) Eastern Province Kings

=== Players Out ===
- (France) Benoit Sicart to (France) SU Agen
- (France) Jonathan Pélissié to (France) Toulon
- (France) Lucas Dupont to (France) Grenoble
- (France) Fred Quercy to (France) US Montauban
- (New Zealand) Rene Ranger to (New Zealand) Blues
- (Samoa) Na'ama Leleimalefaga to (England) Worcester Warriors
- (Fiji) Samisoni Viriviri to (France) US Montauban
- (France) Yohann Artru to (France) USA Perpignan
- (France) Teddy Iribaren to (France) CA Brive
- (France) Thomas Bianchin to (France) Pau
- (New Zealand) Chris King to (France) Pau
- (Argentina) Emiliano Coria to (Italy) Zebre
- (France) David Attoub to (France) Lyon
- (Fiji) Albert Vulivuli to (France) Clermont Auvergne
- (New Zealand) Alex Tulou to (France) Castres Olympique
- (France) Alexandre Bias to (France) Castres Olympique
- (Argentina) Nahuel Lobo to (France) US Carcassonne
- (Argentina) Maximiliano Bustos retired
- (France) Enzo Selponi to (France) USA Perpignan
- (South Africa) Wynand Olivier to (England) Worcester Warriors

== Oyonnax ==
=== Players In ===
- (Wales) Nicky Robinson from (England) Bristol Rugby
- (Romania) Horatiu Pungea from (France) Lyon
- (England) George Robson from (England) Harlequins
- (France) Thomas Bordes from (France) Mont-de-Marsan
- (New Zealand) Piri Weepu from (England) London Welsh
- (France) Mickael de Marco from (France) Lyon
- (Fiji) Uwa Tawalo from (France) Clermont Auvergne
- (France) Quentin Etienne from (France) RC Narbonne
- (Ireland) Eamonn Sheridan from (England) London Irish
- (France) Pierrick Gunther from (France) Lyon
- (Tonga) Fetuʻu Vainikolo from (England) Exeter Chiefs
- (France) Vincent Martin from (France) Lyon
- (France) Jérémie Maurouard from (France) Racing 92
- (France) Fabrice Metz from (France) Racing 92
- (Tonga) Joe Tuineau from (France) Lyon
- (France) Laurent Delboubes from (France) Bordeaux Begles
- (England) Shay Kerry from (England) Worcester Warriors

=== Players Out ===
- (England) Neil Clark retired
- (France) Thibault Lassalle to (France) Toulon
- (Argentina) Benjamin Urdapilleta to (France) Castres Olympique
- (France) Pierre Aguillon to (France) La Rochelle
- (South Africa) Ruaan du Preez to (France) SU Agen
- (France) Clement Biocco retired
- (France) Antoine Guillamon to (France) Toulouse
- (France) Clément Jullien to (France) US Carcassonne
- (France) Yohan Domenech to (France) US Carcassonne
- (Tonga) Paul Ngauamo to (France) Mont-de-Marsan
- (France) Alex Luatua to (France) Aurillac
- (Argentina) Agustin Figuerola to (France) Lyon
- (France) Jean-Francois Coux to (France) Bourgoin
- (France) Christophe Andre to (France) USA Perpignan
- (France) Damien Lagrange to (France) La Rochelle
- (France) Antoine Tichit to (France) Castres Olympique
- (Ireland) Damian Browne retired

== Pau ==
=== Players In ===
- (France) Thierry Lacrampe from (France) Clermont Auvergne
- (New Zealand) Conrad Smith from (New Zealand) Hurricanes
- (Ireland) Sean Dougall from (Ireland) Munster
- (France) Julien Pierre from (France) Clermont Auvergne
- (France) Charly Malie from (France) Montauban
- (France) Thomas Bianchin from (France) Montpellier
- (New Zealand) Chris King from (France) Montpellier
- (New Zealand) Colin Slade from (New Zealand) Crusaders
- (Fiji) Watisoni Votu from (France) Perpignan
- (France) Mosese Ratuvou from (France) Lyon
- (France) Pierre Dupouy from (France) Auch
- (Scotland) Euan Murray from (Scotland) Glasgow Warriors
- (Ireland) Paddy Butler from (Ireland) Munster
- (Argentina) Santiago Fernandez from (France) Bayonne

=== Players Out ===
- (France) Antoine Lescalmel to (France) US Montauban
- (France) Jean-Baptiste Barrère to (France) Béziers
- (France) Clément Bourgeois to (France) US Montauban
- (Tonga) Peni Fakelau to (France) Bourgoin
- (France) Mickael Drouard to (France) US Nevers
- (France) Lucas Condou to (France) SC Albi
- (France) Thomas Toevalu to (France) Bourgoin
- (Australia) Marlon Solofuti to (France) Angoulême

== Racing ==
=== Players In ===
- (France) Yannick Nyanga from (France) Toulouse
- (New Zealand) Dan Carter from (New Zealand) Crusaders
- (France) Rémi Talès from (France) Castres Olympique
- (New Zealand) Chris Masoe from (France) Toulon
- (Tonga) Lisiate Faʻaoso from (France) Bayonne
- (Argentina) Manuel Carizza from (South Africa) Stormers
- (New Zealand) Ben Tameifuna from (New Zealand) Chiefs
- (Italy) Martin Castrogiovanni from (France) Toulon
- (South Africa) Akker van der Merwe from (South Africa) Lions
- (New Zealand) Joe Rokocoko from (France) Bayonne

=== Players Out ===
- (Ireland) Johnny Sexton to (Ireland) Leinster
- (France) Walter Desmaison to (France) Grenoble
- (France) Camille Gérondeau to (France) Clermont Auvergne
- (France) Laurent Magnaval to (France) Biarritz Olympique
- (Argentina) Tomás Lavanini to (Argentina) Jaguares
- (Wales) Jamie Roberts to (England) Harlequins
- (France) Benjamin Lapeyre to (France) La Rochelle
- (France) Jérémie Maurouard to (France) Oyonnax
- (France) Fabrice Metz to (France) Oyonnax
- (France) Adrien Planté to (France) Clermont Auvergne
- (Tonga) Sona Taumalolo to (France) Grenoble
- (France) Maxime Javaux to (France) Provence
- (South Africa) Brian Mujati to (England) Sale Sharks

== Stade Français ==
=== Players In ===
- (Australia) Paul Alo-Emile from (Australia) Melbourne Rebels
- (Australia) Patrick Sio from (Australia) Eastwood
- (France) Emmanuel Felsina from (France) Lyon
- (Fiji) Avenisi Vasuinubu from (France) US Colomiers
- (Australia) Will Genia from (Australia) Queensland Reds
- (France) Sekou Macalou from (France) RC Massy
- (South Africa) Willem Alberts from (South Africa) Sharks

=== Players Out ===
- (France) Romain Frou to (France) US Nevers
- (France) Nicolas Garrault to (France) Tarbes
- (Georgia (country)) Davit Kubriashvili to (France) Montpellier
- (United States) Scott LaValla retired
- (France) Pierre Rabadan retired
- (France) Jerome Fillol retired
- (Argentina) Santiago García Botta to (Argentina) Jaguares
- (Australia) Richard Kingi retired
- (Australia) David Lyons retired
- (New Zealand) Krisnan Inu to (France) Catalans Dragons
- (Australia) Digby Ioane to (Japan) Honda Heat

== Toulon ==
=== Players In ===
- (New Zealand) Ma'a Nonu from (New Zealand) Hurricanes
- (France) Jonathan Pélissié from (France) Montpellier
- (France) Thibault Lassalle from (France) Oyonnax
- (Australia) Salesi Ma'afu from (England) Northampton Saints
- (United States) Samu Manoa from (England) Northampton Saints
- (France) Mohamed Boughanmi from (France) Béziers
- (France) Julien Caminati from (France) Grenoble
- (Australia) James O'Connor from (Australia) Queensland Reds
- (Australia) Quade Cooper from (Australia) Queensland Reds
- (France) Charles Ollivon from (France) Bayonne
- (France) Anthony Etrillard from (France) Bayonne
- (Ireland) Paul O'Connell from (Ireland) Munster
- (South Africa) Duane Vermeulen from (South Africa) Stormers
- (England) Matt Stevens from (South Africa) Sharks
- (New Zealand) Tom Taylor from (New Zealand) Crusaders

=== Players Out ===
- (South Africa) Bakkies Botha retired
- (New Zealand) Carl Hayman retired
- (New Zealand) Ali Williams retired
- (South Africa) Michael Claassens to (South Africa) Sharks
- (France) Nicolas Durand to (France) Lyon
- (New Zealand) Chris Masoe to (France) Racing 92
- (Argentina) Nicolás Sánchez to (Argentina) Jaguares
- (France) Stéphane Munoz to (France) Montauban
- (France) Corentin Braendlin to (France) Agen
- (New Zealand) Rudi Wulf to (France) Castres Olympique
- (Samoa) David Smith to (France) Castres Olympique
- (Italy) Martin Castrogiovanni to (France) Racing 92

== Toulouse ==
=== Players In ===
- Semi Kunatani from Fiji Sevens
- (South Africa) Gert Muller from (France) Bayonne
- (France) David Mele from (England) Leicester Tigers

=== Players Out ===
- (France) Yannick Nyanga to (France) Racing 92
- (South Africa) Jano Vermaak to (South Africa) Stormers
- (France) Dorian Aldegheri to (France) US Carcassonne
- (France) Loic Verdy to (France) Provence
- (France) Francois Bouvier to (France) SU Agen
- (South Africa) Schalk Ferreira to (South Africa) Eastern Province Kings

== See also ==
- List of 2015–16 Premiership Rugby transfers
- List of 2015–16 RFU Championship transfers
- List of 2015–16 Pro12 transfers
- List of 2015–16 Super Rugby transfers
- List of 2015 SuperLiga transfers
