= 2013–14 Heineken Cup pool stage =

- Season: 2013–14 Heineken Cup
- Date: 11 October 2013 – 19 January 2014

Qualifiers
- Seed 1: (Ireland) Ulster
- Seed 2: (France) Clermont
- Seed 3: (France) Toulon
- Seed 4: (Ireland) Munster
- Seed 5: (France) Toulouse
- Seed 6: (Ireland) Leinster
- Seed 7: (England) Leicester Tigers
- Seed 8: (England) Saracens

The 2013–14 Heineken Cup pool stage is the first stage of the 19th season of the Heineken Cup, Europe's top competition for rugby union clubs. It involves 24 teams competing for eight quarter-final berths, awarded to the winners of each of six pools, plus the two top-ranked second-place teams. The next three best runners-up will be parachuted into the Amlin Challenge Cup.

The pool stage will begin on 11 October 2013 and run through to 17–19 January 2014. The quarter-finalists will then participate in a knockout tournament that ultimately ends with the final at the Millennium Stadium in Cardiff on Saturday 24 May 2014.

== Seeding ==
The seeding system was the same as in the 2012–13 tournament. The 24 competing teams are ranked based on past Heineken Cup and European Challenge Cup performance, with each pool receiving one team from each quartile, or Tier. The requirement to have only one team per country in each pool, however, still applies (with the exception of the inclusion of the seventh French team, Racing Métro 92).

The brackets show each team's European Rugby Club Ranking at the end of the 2012–13 season.

Tier 1	(Ireland) Leinster (1)	(France) Toulon (2)	(France) Toulouse (3)	(France) Clermont Auvergne (4)	(Ireland) Munster (6)	(Ireland) Ulster (7)
Tier 2	(England) Northampton Saints (9)	(Wales) Cardiff Blues (10)	(England) Harlequins (11)	(England) Saracens (12)	(England) Leicester Tigers (13)	(France) Perpignan (14)
Tier 3	(Scotland) Edinburgh (15)	(Wales) Ospreys (17)	(Wales) Scarlets (18)	(Scotland) Glasgow Warriors (19)	(France) Montpellier (20)	(Ireland) Connacht (21)
Tier 4	(England) Gloucester (23)	(France) Castres Olympique (25)	(France) Racing Métro 92 (26)	(England) Exeter Chiefs (28)	(Italy) Benetton Treviso (29)	(Italy) Zebre (35)

== Pool stage ==
The draw for the pool stage took place on 5 June 2013 at the Aviva Stadium in Dublin. The dates and times of the first 4 rounds were announced on 20 July 2013.

Under rules of the competition organiser, European Rugby Cup, tiebreakers within each pool are as follows.

- Competition points earned in head-to-head matches
- Total tries scored in head-to-head matches
- Point differential in head-to-head matches

ERC has four additional tiebreakers, used if tied teams are in different pools, or if the above steps cannot break a tie between teams in the same pool:

- Tries scored in all pool matches
- Point differential in all pool matches
- Best disciplinary record (fewest players receiving red or yellow cards in all pool matches)
- Coin toss

Key to colours
Winner of each pool, advance to quarterfinals.
Two highest-scoring second-place teams advance to quarterfinals.
Third- through fifth- highest-scoring second-place teams parachute into the knockout stage of the European Challenge Cup.

All kickoff times are local to the match location.

=== Pool 1 ===
Team	P	W	D	L	PF	PA	Diff	TF	TA	TB	LB	Pts
(Ireland) Leinster (6)	6	5	0	1	152	66	+86	16	7	2	0	22
(England) Northampton Saints (5C)	6	4	0	2	107	104	+3	11	10	0	1	17
(France) Castres Olympique	6	2	0	4	78	104	−26	5	6	0	1	9
(Wales) Ospreys	6	1	0	5	75	138	−63	3	12	0	1	5
Source : www.ercrugby.com Points breakdown: *4 points for a win *2 points for a draw *1 bonus point for a loss by seven points or less *1 bonus point for scoring four or more tries in a match

12 October 2013
16:40

Castres Olympique (France)	19–13	(England) Northampton Saints (1 BP)
Try: Martial 8' c Con: Kockott (1/1); Pen: Kockott (4/4) 37', 43', 54', 72'	Report	Try: Hartley 50' c Con: Myler (1/1); Pen: Myler (2/3) 30', 69'

Stade Pierre-Antoine
Attendance: 7,624
Referee: George Clancy (IRFU)

12 October 2013
18:00

Ospreys (Wales)	9–19	(Ireland) Leinster
Pen: Biggar (3/3) 2', 8', 44'	Report	Try: O'Brien 28' c Con: Gopperth (1/1); Pen: Gopperth (4/4) 14', 34', 48', 78'

Liberty Stadium
Attendance: 12,378
Referee: Wayne Barnes (RFU)

19 October 2013
15:40

Leinster (Ireland)	19–7	(France) Castres Olympique
Try: McGrath 61' c Con: Gopperth (1/1); Pen: Gopperth (4/5) 2', 11', 17', 68'	Report	Try: Kockott 32' c Con: Kockott (1/1)

RDS Arena
Attendance: 18,542
Referee: Greg Garner (RFU)

20 October 2013
12:45

Northampton Saints (England)	27–16	(Wales) Ospreys
Try: Manoa 11' c Day 26' c Foden 56' c Con: Myler (3/3); Pen: Myler (2/3) 1', 69'	Report	Try: Biggar 44' c Con: Biggar (1/1); Pen: Biggar (3/3) 18', 21', 62'

Franklin's Gardens
Attendance: 13,182
Referee: Alain Rolland (IRFU)

6 December 2013
21:00

Castres Olympique (France)	15–9	(Wales) Ospreys (1 BP)
Pen: Kockott (4/7) 13', 30', 48', 61'; Palis (1/1) 76'	Report	Pen: Biggar (3/3) 4', 21', 73'

Stade Pierre-Antoine
Attendance: 7,108
Referee: Peter Fitzgibbon (IRFU)

7 December 2013
18:00

Northampton Saints (England)	7–40	(Ireland) Leinster (1 BP)
Try: L. Dickson 66' c Con: Myler (1/1)	Report	Try: Fitzgerald (3) 2' c, 7' m, 69' c Heaslip 26' c Reddan 36' c O'Driscoll 62' c Con: Madigan (5/6)

Franklin's Gardens
Attendance: 13,475
Referee: Nigel Owens (WRU)

13 December 2013
20:00

Ospreys (Wales)	21–12	(France) Castres Olympique
Pen: Biggar (7/7) 9', 12', 23', 27', 42', 60', 70'	Report	Pen: Kockott (4/4) 5', 15', 33', 40'

Liberty Stadium
Attendance: 6,385
Referee: Luke Pearce (RFU)

14 December 2013
18:00

Leinster (Ireland)	9–18	(England) Northampton Saints
Pen: Madigan (3/3) 10', 45', 72'	Report	Try: North 5' c Elliott 80' m Con: Myler (1/2); Pen: Myler (1/3) 64'; Drop: Fotuali'i (1/1) 78'

Aviva Stadium
Attendance: 47,370
Referee: Jérôme Garcès (FFR)

12 January 2014
12:45

Ospreys (Wales)	17–29	(England) Northampton Saints
Try: Webb 63' c A. W. Jones 74' c Con: Biggar (2/2); Pen: Biggar (1/1) 16'	Report	Try: North 41' m G. Pisi 71' m G. Dickson 76' c Con: G. Dickson (1/1); Pen: Myler (4/4) 2', 14', 28', 32'

Liberty Stadium
Attendance: 8,347
Referee: Pascal Gaüzère (FFR)

12 January 2014
13:45

(1 BP) Castres Olympique (France)	22–29	(Ireland) Leinster
Try: Gray 9' c Dulin 20'; Lamerat 80' m Con: Garcia (2/2); Pen: Garcia (1/2) 38'	Report	Try: Gopperth (2) 28' c, 40' m Murphy 76' m Con: Gopperth (1/3); Pen: Gopperth (3/3) 55', 60', 62'; Drop: R. Kearney (1/1) 57'

Stade Pierre-Antoine
Attendance: 8,082
Referee: Nigel Owens (WRU)

17 January 2014
20:00

(1 BP) Leinster (Ireland)	36–3	(Wales) Ospreys
Try: Penalty try (2) 32' c, 61' c Healy 37' c Murphy 71' c Boss 74' m Con: Gopperth (4/5); Pen: Gopperth (1/1) 8'	Report	Pen: Biggar (1/1) 12'

RDS Arena
Attendance: 18,500
Referee: Romain Poite (FFR)

17 January 2014
20:00

Northampton Saints (England)	13–3	(France) Castres Olympique
Try: G. Pisi 79' c Con: G. Dickson (1/1); Pen: Myler (2/2) 40', 76'	Report	Pen: Kockott (1/2) 54'

Franklin's Gardens
Attendance: 12,302
Referee: Alain Rolland (IRFU)

=== Pool 2 ===
Team	P	W	D	L	PF	PA	Diff	TF	TA	TB	LB	Pts
(France) Toulon (3)	6	5	0	1	170	104	+66	15	10	3	1	24
(Wales) Cardiff Blues	6	3	0	3	119	148	−29	10	14	1	1	14
(England) Exeter Chiefs	6	2	0	4	118	123	−5	11	14	1	3	12
(Scotland) Glasgow Warriors	6	2	0	4	98	130	−32	12	10	1	2	11
Source : www.ercrugby.com Points breakdown: *4 points for a win *2 points for a draw *1 bonus point for a loss by seven points or less *1 bonus point for scoring four or more tries in a match

13 October 2013
12:45

(1 BP) Exeter Chiefs (England)	44–29	(Wales) Cardiff Blues (1 BP)
Try: Johnson 8' m Mumm 24' c Jess 26' c Vainikolo 29' c White 37' c Whitten 51' m Con: Steenson (4/6); Pen: Steenson (1/1) 16'; Slade (1/1) 75'	Report	Try: L. Williams 54' c Copeland 59' c Cuthbert 65' m Robinson 71' c Con: Halfpenny (3/4); Pen: Halfpenny (1/1) 12'

Sandy Park
Attendance: 8,751
Referee: Jérôme Garcès (FFR)

13 October 2013
16:00

(1 BP) Toulon (France)	51–28	(Scotland) Glasgow Warriors (1 BP)
Try: D. Armitage 8' c Mermoz (2) 15' c, 34' c Masoe 24' c Giteau (2) 49' c, 78' c Con: Wilkinson (3/3); Giteau (1/1); Michalak (2/2); Pen: Wilkinson (1/1) 6'; Michalak (2/2) 40', 64'	Report	Try: van der Merwe (2) 41' c, 62' c Matawalu 52' c Gray 58' c Con: Jackson (4/4)

Stade Mayol
Attendance: 14,145
Referee: Greg Garner (RFU)

19 October 2013
13:35

Cardiff Blues (Wales)	19–15	(France) Toulon (1 BP)
Try: G. Davies 77' c Con: Halfpenny (1/1); Pen: Patchell (1/2) 3'; Halfpenny (3/4) 38', 59', 68'	Report	Pen: Wilkinson (5/7) 20', 27', 44', 53', 71'

Cardiff Arms Park
Attendance: 11,573
Referee: JP Doyle (RFU)

20 October 2013
14:00

Glasgow Warriors (Scotland)	20–16	(England) Exeter Chiefs (1 BP)
Try: Swinson 48' c Holmes 71' c Con: Jackson (2/2); Pen: Jackson (2/3) 6', 14'	Report	Try: Ewers 75' c Con: Slade (1/1); Pen: Steenson (3/4) 2', 12', 20'

Scotstoun Stadium
Attendance: 6,047
Referee: Romain Poite (FFR)

6 December 2013
20:00

Cardiff Blues (Wales)	29–20	(Scotland) Glasgow Warriors
Try: Patchell 21' c Cuthbert 72' c Con: Halfpenny (2/2); Pen: Halfpenny (4/5) 11', 31', 46', 70'; Patchell (1/1) 15'	Report	Try: Maitland 38' c Nakarawa 78' c Con: Weir (2/2); Pen: Weir (2/2) 52', 62'

Cardiff Arms Park
Attendance: 6,144
Referee: George Clancy (IRFU)

7 December 2013
13:35

(1 BP) Exeter Chiefs (England)	9–14	(France) Toulon
Pen: Steenson (2/2) 2', 18'; Slade (1/1) 35'	Report	Try: Fresia 3' m Pen: Wilkinson (1/4) 10'; Giteau (1/1) 65'; Drop: Wilkinson (1/1) 74'

Sandy Park
Attendance: 10,744
Referee: Alain Rolland (IRFU)

13 December 2013
20:00

(1 BP) Glasgow Warriors (Scotland)	7–9	(Wales) Cardiff Blues
Try: Grant 70' c Con: Weir (1/1)	Report	Pen: Patchell (1/1) 6'; Halfpenny (2/3) 22', 65'

Scotstoun Stadium
Attendance: 5,429
Referee: Pascal Gaüzère (FFR)

14 December 2013
14:35

(1 BP) Toulon (France)	32–20	(England) Exeter Chiefs
Try: Smith (2) 11' m, 26' c Chiocci 64' c Wilkinson 70' c Con: Giteau (3/4); Pen: Giteau (2/3) 36', 43'	Report	Try: Armand 16' c White 77' c Con: Slade (1/1); Sweeney (1/1); Pen: Slade (2/2) 39', 54'

Stade Mayol
Attendance: 13,567
Referee: John Lacey (IRFU)

11 January 2014
15:00

(1 BP) Exeter Chiefs (England)	10–15	(Scotland) Glasgow Warriors
Try: Vainikolo 16' c Con: Slade (1/1); Pen: Slade (1/2) 2'	Report	Try: Maitland 18' m Lamont 34' c Con: Hogg (1/1); Pen: Hogg (1/1) 49'

Sandy Park
Attendance: 6,978
Referee: George Clancy (IRFU)

11 January 2014
16:40

(1 BP) Toulon (France)	43–20	(Wales) Cardiff Blues
Try: Penalty try (3) 42' c, 46' c, 80' c Smith 48' c Con: Wilkinson (4/4); Pen: Wilkinson (5/6) 1', 7', 29', 31', 38'	Report	Try: Paulo 33' c Hobbs 69' c Con: Halfpenny (2/2); Pen: Halfpenny (2/2) 12', 17'

Allianz Riviera
Attendance: 31,170
Referee: Greg Garner (RFU)

18 January 2014
15:40

(1 BP) Cardiff Blues (Wales)	13–19	(England) Exeter Chiefs
Try: Cuthbert 36' c Con: Halfpenny (1/1); Pen: Halfpenny (2/4) 28', 53'	Report	Try: Armand 3' c Con: Steenson (1/1); Pen: Steenson (4/4) 11', 23', 58', 79'

Cardiff Arms Park
Attendance: 12,125
Referee: John Lacey (IRFU)

18 January 2014
15:40

(1 BP) Glasgow Warriors (Scotland)	8–15	(France) Toulon
Try: Fusaro 63' m Pen: Jackson (1/1) 30'	Report	Pen: Wilkinson (5/7) 27', 37', 42', 51', 57'

Scotstoun Stadium
Attendance: 6,541
Referee: JP Doyle (RFU)

=== Pool 3 ===
Team	P	W	D	L	PF	PA	Diff	TF	TA	TB	LB	Pts
(France) Toulouse (5)	6	5	0	1	143	63	+80	16	4	2	1	23
(England) Saracens (8)	6	4	0	2	217	74	+143	29	5	3	1	20
(Ireland) Connacht	6	3	0	3	101	147	−46	7	20	0	1	13
(Italy) Zebre	6	0	0	6	33	210	−177	2	25	0	0	0
Source : www.ercrugby.com Points breakdown: *4 points for a win *2 points for a draw *1 bonus point for a loss by seven points or less *1 bonus point for scoring four or more tries in a match

11 October 2013
20:00

(1 BP) Connacht (Ireland)	17–23	(England) Saracens
Try: Marmion 17' c Poolman 30' c Con: Parks (2/2); Pen: Parks (1/2) 7'	Report	Try: Wyles 5' c Ashton 8' c Con: Farrell (2/2); Pen: Farrell (3/3) 25', 52', 74'

The Sportsground
Attendance: 7,546
Referee: Pascal Gaüzère (FFR)

11 October 2013
21:00

(1 BP) Toulouse (France)	38–5	(Italy) Zebre
Try: Huget (2) 11' c, 20' m Lamboley 17' m Médard (2) 33' c, 43' c Nyanga 56' c Con: Bézy (3/5); Barraque (1/1)	Report	Try: Berryman 44' m

Stade Ernest-Wallon
Attendance: 12,008
Referee: Luke Pearce (RFU)

18 October 2013
19:45

(1 BP) Saracens (England)	16–17	(France) Toulouse
Try: Wyles 8' c Con: Farrell (1/1); Pen: Farrell (3/5) 30', 36', 51'	Report	Try: Tolofua 19' c Picamoles 69' c Con: Doussain (2/2); Pen: Doussain (1/1) 66'

Wembley Stadium
Attendance: 61,248
Referee: Nigel Owens (WRU)

19 October 2013
14:35

Zebre (Italy)	6–33	(Ireland) Connacht
Pen: Orquera (2/2) 5', 48'	Report	Try: Naoupu 29' c Fafita 70' m Con: Parks (1/2); Pen: Parks (7/7) 1', 7', 34', 37', 58', 60', 64'

Stadio XXV Aprile
Attendance: 2,000
Referee: Ian Davies (WRU)

7 December 2013
14:35

Zebre (Italy)	10–39	(England) Saracens (1 BP)
Try: Vunisa 77' c Con: Orquera (1/1); Pen: Garcia (1/1) 43'	Report	Try: Kruis 13' c Joubert 24' m Wyles 31' c Ashton (2) 61' c, 68' c Con: Hodgson (3/4); Farrell (1/1); Pen: Hodgson (2/2) 6', 19'

Stadio XXV Aprile
Attendance: 2,350
Referee: Pascal Gaüzère (FFR)

8 December 2013
16:00

(1 BP) Toulouse (France)	14–16	(Ireland) Connacht
Try: Barraque 39' c Dusautoir 64' c Con: Barraque (1/1); Beauxis (1/1)	Report	Try: Marmion 47' c Con: Parks (1/1); Pen: Parks (2/3) 12', 45'; Drop: Parks (1/2) 15'

Stade Ernest-Wallon
Attendance: 16,742
Referee: Marius Mitrea (FIR)

14 December 2013
15:00

(1 BP) Saracens (England)	64–3	(Italy) Zebre
Try: Strettle 4' c Burger 14' m George 20' c Wigglesworth 26' c Ransom 45' c Taylor (2) 50' c, 60' c Vunipola 68' c Ashton 80' c Con: Farrell (8/9); Pen: Farrell (1/1) 1'	Report	Pen: Orquera (1/2) 29'

Allianz Park
Attendance: 7,395
Referee: Dudley Phillips (IRFU)

14 December 2013
18:00

Connacht (Ireland)	9–37	(France) Toulouse (1 BP)
Pen: Parks (1/2) 2'; Drop: Parks (2/2) 13', 32'	Report	Try: Médard (2) 11' c, 26' m Tolofua 36' c Picamoles 54' m Fickou 78' c Con: Beauxis (3/5); Pen: Beauxis (2/4) 4', 72'

The Sportsground
Attendance: 7,661
Referee: Leighton Hodges (WRU)

11 January 2014
15:40

Connacht (Ireland)	20–3	(Italy) Zebre
Try: Healy 34' c Henshaw 42' c Con: Carty (2/2); Pen: Carty (2/3) 24', 29'	Report	Pen: Orquera (1/2) 15'

The Sportsground
Attendance: 5,217
Referee: Neil Paterson (SRU)

12 January 2014
16:00

Toulouse (France)	21–11	(England) Saracens
Pen: Doussain (7/8) 1', 14', 29', 33', 50', 61', 77'	Report	Try: Ashton 6' m Pen: Farrell (2/2) 27', 65'

Stade Ernest-Wallon
Attendance: 18,838
Referee: Alain Rolland (IRFU)

18 January 2014
13:35

(1 BP) Saracens (England)	64–6	(Ireland) Connacht
Try: Ashton (2) 10' m, 80' c Strettle (3) 26' m, 41' m, 76' m Brits 40' m Goode 49' m Kruis 57' c Wyles 65' m Wray 68' c Johnston 71' m Con: Hodgson (3/10); Pen: Hodgson (1/2) 22'	Report	Pen: Parks (2/2) 5', 20'

Allianz Park
Attendance: 9,614
Referee: Leighton Hodges (WRU)

18 January 2014
14:45

Zebre (Italy)	6–16	(France) Toulouse
Pen: Orquera (2/4) 15', 53'	Report	Try: Bézy 38' c Con: Doussain (1/1); Pen: Doussain (2/2) 4', 68'; Bézy (1/1) 62'

Stadio XXV Aprile
Attendance: 2,150
Referee: Dudley Phillips (IRFU)

=== Pool 4 ===
Team	P	W	D	L	PF	PA	Diff	TF	TA	TB	LB	Pts
(France) Clermont (2)	6	5	0	1	139	69	+70	17	5	3	1	24
(England) Harlequins (6C)	6	3	0	3	126	103	+23	12	12	1	3	16
(Wales) Scarlets	6	2	1	3	122	150	−28	11	17	0	1	11
(France) Racing Métro 92	6	1	1	4	66	131	−65	5	12	0	1	7
Source : www.ercrugby.com Points breakdown: *4 points for a win *2 points for a draw *1 bonus point for a loss by seven points or less *1 bonus point for scoring four or more tries in a match

12 October 2013
15:40

(1 BP) Harlequins (England)	26–33	(Wales) Scarlets
Try: Brown (2) 31' c, 68' c Con: Evans (2/2); Pen: Evans (3/4) 20', 55', 61'; Drop: Evans (1/1) 43'	Report	Try: R. Williams 7' c S. Williams 39' c J. Williams 62' c Con: Priestland (3/3); Pen: Priestland (4/4) 11', 14', 49', 53'

The Stoop
Attendance: 11,465
Referee: John Lacey (IRFU)

13 October 2013
21:00

Racing Métro 92 (France)	13–9	(France) Clermont (1 BP)
Try: Andreu 42' c Con: Sexton (1/1); Pen: Sexton (2/2) 32', 53'	Report	Pen: Parra (3/4) 9', 23', 35'

Stade Olympique Yves-du-Manoir
Attendance: 9,357
Referee: Nigel Owens (WRU)

19 October 2013
18:00

Scarlets (Wales)	26–26	(France) Racing Métro 92
Try: S. Williams 20' c R. Williams 39' c Con: Priestland (2/2); Pen: Priestland (4/6) 18', 34', 43', 64'	Report	Try: Lauret 7' c Matadigo 51' c Con: Sexton (2/2); Pen: Sexton (4/6) 13', 49', 60', 69'

Parc y Scarlets
Attendance: 8,388
Referee: Neil Paterson (SRU)

20 October 2013
16:00

Clermont (France)	23–16	(England) Harlequins (1 BP)
Try: Byrne 7' m Fofana 19' m Lacrampe 25' c Con: James (1/3); Pen: James (2/2) 2', 44'	Report	Try: Williams 39' c Con: Evans (1/1); Pen: Botica (1/1) 12'; Evans (1/2) 24'; Drop: Evans (1/1) 80'

Stade Marcel-Michelin
Attendance: 17,631
Referee: George Clancy (IRFU)

7 December 2013
14:35

(1 BP) Clermont (France)	32–11	(Wales) Scarlets
Try: Cudmore 46' c Nalaga (2) 52' c, 58' m Ric 80' c Con: James (2/3); Delany (1/1); Pen: James (2/2) 8', 11'	Report	Try: R. Williams 78' m Pen: Priestland (1/2) 15'; J. Williams (1/1) 47'

Stade Marcel-Michelin
Attendance: 17,140
Referee: JP Doyle (RFU)

7 December 2013
16:40

Racing Métro 92 (France)	8–32	(England) Harlequins (1 BP)
Try: Le Roux 57' m Pen: Dambielle (1/1) 40'	Report	Try: Evans 18' c Easter 29' c Walker 44' c Dickson 72' m Con: Evans (3/4); Pen: Evans (2/2) 23', 43'

Stade de la Beaujoire
Attendance: 29,395
Referee: Leighton Hodges (WRU)

14 December 2013
15:40

Scarlets (Wales)	13–31	(France) Clermont (1 BP)
Try: Maule 31' c Con: Priestland (1/1); Pen: Priestland (2/3) 22', 38'	Report	Try: Nalaga (2) 1' c, 73' c Penalty try 59' c Lee 66' c Con: Delany (1/1); James (3/3); Pen: Delany (1/3) 40'

Parc y Scarlets
Attendance: 7,591
Referee: Wayne Barnes (RFU)

15 December 2013
12:45

Harlequins (England)	17–3	(France) Racing Métro 92
Try: Walker 40' m Pen: Evans (3/4) 7', 11', 24'; Botica (1/1) 51'	Report	Pen: Sexton (1/2) 59'

The Stoop
Attendance: 11,502
Referee: Alain Rolland (IRFU)

10 January 2014
21:00

(1 BP) Racing Métro 92 (France)	13–19	(Wales) Scarlets
Try: Phillips 8' c Con: Sexton (1/1); Pen: Sexton (1/1) 40'; Hernández (1/1) 60'	Report	Try: K. Phillips 61' c Con: Priestland (1/1); Pen: Priestland (4/5) 4', 38', 48', 54'

Stade Olympique Yves-du-Manoir
Attendance: 6,658
Referee: Luke Pearce (RFU)

11 January 2014
13:35

(1 BP) Harlequins (England)	13–16	(France) Clermont
Try: Hopper 22' c Con: Evans (1/1); Pen: Evans (2/4) 29', 32'	Report	Try: Nalaga 45' m Sivivatu 72' m Pen: James (2/3) 2', 76'

The Stoop
Attendance: 12,816
Referee: John Lacey (IRFU)

19 January 2014
15:00

(1 BP) Scarlets (Wales)	20–22	(England) Harlequins
Try: Davies 4' c Shingler 38' m S. Williams 49' m Con: Priestland (1/3); Pen: Priestland (1/1) 34'	Report	Try: Brown 12' c Lindsay-Hague 27' c Dickson 43' m Con: Evans (2/3); Pen: T. Williams (1/1) 77'

Parc y Scarlets
Attendance: 7,516
Referee: Jérôme Garcès (FFR)

19 January 2014
16:00

(1 BP) Clermont (France)	28–3	(France) Racing Métro 92
Try: Lee 5' c Vosloo (2) 23' c, 60' c Debaty 66' c Con: Delany (4/4)	Report	Pen: Machenaud (1/1) 34'

Stade Marcel-Michelin
Attendance: 17,341
Referee: Greg Garner (RFU)

=== Pool 5 ===
Team	P	W	D	L	PF	PA	Diff	TF	TA	TB	LB	Pts
(Ireland) Ulster (1)	6	6	0	0	179	62	+117	17	4	2	0	26
(England) Leicester Tigers (7)	6	4	0	2	159	112	+47	16	9	3	2	21
(France) Montpellier	6	2	0	4	121	124	−3	14	11	2	1	11
(Italy) Benetton Treviso	6	0	0	6	41	202	−161	2	25	0	0	0
Source : www.ercrugby.com Points breakdown: *4 points for a win *2 points for a draw *1 bonus point for a loss by seven points or less *1 bonus point for scoring four or more tries in a match

11 October 2013
20:00

Ulster (Ireland)	22–16	(England) Leicester Tigers (1 BP)
Try: Bowe 15' c Con: Jackson (1/1); Pen: Jackson (5/6) 31', 39', 58', 65', 71'	Report	Try: Mulipola 6' c Con: Flood (1/1); Pen: Flood (2/3) 19', 43'; Williams (1/1) 76'

Ravenhill
Attendance: 14,026
Referee: Romain Poite (FFR)

12 October 2013
14:35

Benetton Treviso (Italy)	10–27	(France) Montpellier
Try: Loamanu 73' c Con: Botes (1/1); Pen: Botes (1/3) 24'	Report	Try: Pélissié 65' c Combezou 71' m Con: Pélissié (1/2); Pen: Paillaugue (4/4) 1', 20', 35', 45'; Pélissié (1/1) 59'

Stadio Comunale di Monigo
Attendance: 4,635
Referee: Dudley Phillips (IRFU)

18 October 2013
20:00

(1 BP) Leicester Tigers (England)	34–3	(Italy) Benetton Treviso
Try: Waldrom 37' c T. Youngs 56' c Scully 65' c Thompstone 80' c Con: Flood (4/4); Pen: Flood (2/2) 16', 25'	Report	Pen: Botes (1/1) 47'

Welford Road
Attendance: 19,838
Referee: Pascal Gaüzère (FFR)

19 October 2013
16:40

Montpellier (France)	8–25	(Ireland) Ulster
Try: Audrin 50' m Pen: Pélissié (1/1) 4'	Report	Try: Trimble 10' c Con: Jackson (1/1); Pen: Pienaar (5/7) 44', 53', 59', 70', 73'; Jackson (1/2) 80'

Stade Yves-du-Manoir
Attendance: 11,712
Referee: Leighton Hodges (WRU)

7 December 2013
18:00

(1 BP) Ulster (Ireland)	48–0	(Italy) Benetton Treviso
Try: Jackson 4' m L. Marshall (2) 15' c, 74' c Afoa 29' c Tuohy 58' c Doyle 65' c Trimble 70' m Con: Jackson (5/7); Pen: Jackson (1/1) 40'	Report

Ravenhill
Attendance: 12,977
Referee: Luke Pearce (RFU)

8 December 2013
15:00

(1 BP) Leicester Tigers (England)	41–32	(France) Montpellier (1 BP)
Try: Goneva 3' c Benjamin (2) 12' c, 14' c Gibson 61' m Con: Flood (3/4); Pen: Flood (4/5) 6', 56', 65', 72'; Drop: Lamb (1/1) 80'	Report	Try: Gorgodze 28' c Nagusa 39' m Bérard (2) 66' c, 78' c Con: Pélissié (2/3); Trinh-Duc (1/1); Pen: Pélissié (2/3) 9', 21'

Welford Road
Attendance: 21,404
Referee: John Lacey (IRFU)

14 December 2013
14:35

Benetton Treviso (Italy)	3–35	(Ireland) Ulster (1 BP)
Pen: Di Bernardo (1/1) 29'	Report	Try: L. Marshall 37' m Gilroy 62' c Diack 67' c Payne 77' c Con: Jackson (3/4); Pen: Jackson (3/5) 10', 40', 46'

Stadio Comunale di Monigo
Attendance: 3,880
Referee: Greg Garner (RFU)

15 December 2013
16:00

(1 BP) Montpellier (France)	14–15	(England) Leicester Tigers
Try: Selponi 52' c Dupont 62' c Con: Paillaugue (1/1); Escande (1/1)	Report	Try: T. Youngs 50' m Goneva 79' c Con: Lamb (1/1); Pen: Lamb (1/1) 71'

Stade Yves-du-Manoir
Attendance: 10,859
Referee: Nigel Owens (WRU)

10 January 2014
20:00

Ulster (Ireland)	27–16	(France) Montpellier
Try: Diack 23' c Pienaar 26' c Afoa 56' c Con: Pienaar (3/3); Pen: Pienaar (2/3) 35', 42'	Report	Try: Tchale-Watchou 30' c Con: Escande (1/1); Pen: Escande (3/5) 6', 40', 49'

Ravenhill
Attendance: 14,000
Referee: Wayne Barnes (RFU)

11 January 2014
14:35

Benetton Treviso (Italy)	19–34	(England) Leicester Tigers (1 BP)
Try: Cittadini 18' c Con: Berquist (1/1); Pen: Berquist (4/4) 5', 24', 41', 49'	Report	Try: Salvi 9' m Benjamin (2) 43' m, 67' m Penalty try 63' c Con: Mélé (1/2); Pen: Williams (1/1) 40'; Mélé (3/3) 54', 60', 75'

Stadio Comunale di Monigo
Attendance: 4,425
Referee: Romain Poite (FFR)

18 January 2014
18:00

(1 BP) Leicester Tigers (England)	19–22	(Ireland) Ulster
Try: Morris 49' c Con: Flood (1/1); Pen: Flood (4/5) 4', 11', 23', 46'	Report	Try: Pienaar 58' c Con: Pienaar (1/1); Pen: Pienaar (5/5) 16', 27', 30', 56', 69'

Welford Road
Attendance: 24,000
Referee: Nigel Owens (WRU)

18 January 2014
19:00

(1 BP) Montpellier (France)	24–6	(Italy) Benetton Treviso
Try: Ranger 19' m Gorgodze 35' m Dupont 63' c Bérard 80' c Con: Escande (2/2)	Report	Pen: Botes (2/3) 45', 54'

Stade Yves-du-Manoir
Attendance: 4,970
Referee: Ian Davies (WRU)

=== Pool 6 ===
Team	P	W	D	L	PF	PA	Diff	TF	TA	TB	LB	Pts
(Ireland) Munster (4)	6	5	0	1	161	77	+84	19	6	2	1	23
(England) Gloucester (7C)	6	3	0	3	113	114	−1	13	10	1	1	14
(Scotland) Edinburgh	6	3	0	3	104	141	−37	10	17	0	0	12
(France) Perpignan	6	1	0	5	112	158	−46	10	19	1	2	7
Source : www.ercrugby.com Points breakdown: *4 points for a win *2 points for a draw *1 bonus point for a loss by seven points or less *1 bonus point for scoring four or more tries in a match

12 October 2013
13:35

Edinburgh (Scotland)	29–23	(Ireland) Munster (1 BP)
Try: Scott 5' c T. Visser 68' c Con: Laidlaw (2/2); Pen: Laidlaw (5/6) 11', 21', 28', 33', 75'	Report	Try: Laulala 19' c Sherry 25' c Con: Keatley (2/2); Pen: Keatley (3/3) 15', 52', 64'

Murrayfield
Attendance: 7,024
Referee: JP Doyle (RFU)

12 October 2013
18:00

Gloucester (England)	27–22	(France) Perpignan (1 BP)
Try: Cowan 44' c May 74' m Con: Twelvetrees (1/2); Pen: Twelvetrees (5/5) 10', 17', 40', 65', 79'	Report	Try: Hook 1' c Con: Hook (1/1); Pen: Hook (4/4) 21', 36', 49', 53'; Drop: Hook (1/1) 61'

Kingsholm
Attendance: 11,937
Referee: Leighton Hodges (WRU)

19 October 2013
18:00

Munster (Ireland)	26–10	(England) Gloucester
Try: Varley 33' c Murphy 66' c Con: Keatley (2/2); Pen: Keatley (4/5) 3', 9', 12', 65'	Report	Try: Sharples 15' c Con: Bentley (1/1); Pen: Bentley (1/2) 38'

Thomond Park
Attendance: 23,510
Referee: Jérôme Garcès (FFR)

20 October 2013
13:45

(1 BP) Perpignan (France)	31–14	(Scotland) Edinburgh
Try: Michel 43' c Mjekevu (2) 47' c, 63' c Purll 60' c Con: Hook (4/4); Pen: Hook (1/1) 11'	Report	Try: T. Visser 38' c du Preez 76' c Con: Laidlaw (2/2)

Stade Aimé Giral
Attendance: 10,073
Referee: Marius Mitrea (FIR)

8 December 2013
12:45

(1 BP) Munster (Ireland)	36–8	(France) Perpignan
Try: Dougall 2' c Kilcoyne 25' m Earls 34' c Penalty try 65' c Coughlan 77' c Con: Keatley (2/3); Hanrahan (2/2); Pen: Keatley (1/1) 10'	Report	Try: Michel 80' m Pen: Hook (1/2) 44'

Thomond Park
Attendance: 23,615
Referee: Greg Garner (RFU)

8 December 2013
13:00

Edinburgh (Scotland)	12–23	(England) Gloucester
Try: Tonks 6' m Denton 51' c Con: Laidlaw (1/2)	Report	Try: Cook 10' m M. Thomas (2) 17' c, 45' m Con: F. Burns (1/3); Pen: F. Burns (2/3) 15', 31'

Murrayfield
Attendance: 5,417
Referee: Jérôme Garcès (FFR)

14 December 2013
16:40

(1 BP) Perpignan (France)	17–18	(Ireland) Munster
Try: Benvenuti 77' m Pen: Allan (4/7) 6', 18', 24', 63'	Report	Try: Penalty try 48' c Hanrahan 80' m Con: Keatley (1/2); Pen: Keatley (2/4) 15', 67'

Stade Aimé Giral
Attendance: 11,824
Referee: JP Doyle (RFU)

15 December 2013
15:00

(1 BP) Gloucester (England)	10–16	(Scotland) Edinburgh
Try: Penalty try 34' c Con: F. Burns (1/1); Pen: F. Burns (1/2) 45'	Report	Try: Atiga 50' c Con: Cuthbert (1/1); Pen: Cuthbert (3/5) 9', 17', 39'

Kingsholm
Attendance: 10,975
Referee: Romain Poite (FFR)

11 January 2014
18:00

Edinburgh (Scotland)	27–16	(France) Perpignan
Try: Brown 15' c du Preez 45' c Fife 56' c Con: Laidlaw (3/3); Pen: Laidlaw (2/3) 11', 37'	Report	Try: Delonca 74' c Con: Hook (1/1); Pen: Hook (3/3) 19', 32', 42'

Murrayfield
Attendance: 5,061
Referee: Peter Fitzgibbon (IRFU)

11 January 2014
18:00

Gloucester (England)	7–20	(Ireland) Munster
Try: Sharples 39' c Con: F. Burns (1/1)	Report	Try: Earls 32' c P. O'Mahony 60' c Con: Keatley (2/2); Pen: Keatley (2/3) 21', 69'

Kingsholm
Attendance: 16,121
Referee: Leighton Hodges (WRU)

19 January 2014
12:45

(1 BP) Munster (Ireland)	38–6	(Scotland) Edinburgh
Try: Coughlan 7' m Murphy 21' c Murray 43' c P. O'Mahony 56' c Zebo 65' m Jones 75' c Con: Keatley (4/6)	Report	Pen: Laidlaw (2/3) 6', 27'

Thomond Park
Attendance: 25,600
Referee: Wayne Barnes (RFU)

19 January 2014
13:45

Perpignan (France)	18–36	(England) Gloucester (1 BP)
Try: Piukala 18' c Chateau 62' m Con: Ecochard (1/2); Pen: Ecochard (2/4) 3', 41'	Report	Try: May 13' m Monahan (2) 29' c, 53' c Sharples 33' c Morgan 79' c Con: F. Burns (4/5); Drop: F. Burns (1/1) 73'

Stade Aimé Giral
Attendance: 7,235
Referee: George Clancy (IRFU)

== See also ==
- 2013–14 Heineken Cup
