= Whetton =

Whetton is a surname. Notable people with the surname include:

- Alan Whetton (born 1959), New Zealand rugby union player
- Gary Whetton (born 1959), British rugby union player
- Jack Whetton (born 1992), New Zealand rugby union player
- Jacob Whetton (born 1991), Australian field hockey player
- John Whetton (born 1941), British middle-distance runner
- John Whetton Ehninger (1827-1889), American painter and etcher
- William Whetton (born 1989), New Zealand rugby union player
- Penny Whetton (1958–2019), Australian climatologist
