= Bianchin =

Bianchin is an Italian surname. Notable people with the surname include:

- Helen Bianchin (born 1939), Australian writer
- Luca Bianchin (born 1971), Italian swimmer
- Thomas Bianchin (born 1987), French rugby union player
- Wayne Bianchin (born 1953), Canadian-Italian ice hockey player
