= Sylvain Nicolas =

French rugby union player

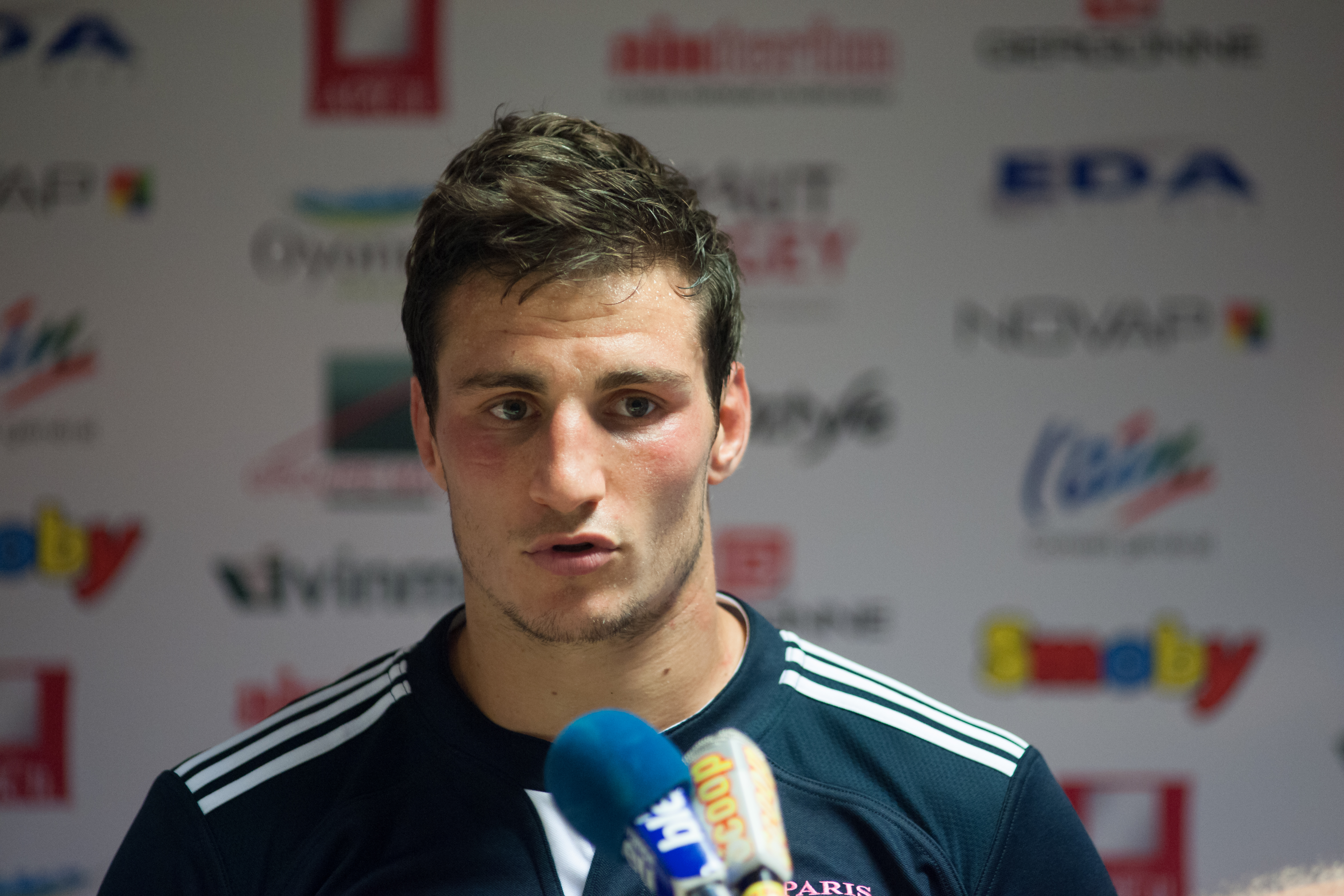
- Born: 21 June 1987 (age 39) Bourgoin-Jallieu, France
- Height: 1.88 m (6 ft 2 in)
- Weight: 102 kg (16 st 1 lb)

Rugby union career
- Position: Flanker
Senior career
Years	Team	Apps	(Points)
2007–2010	Bourgoin	54	(15)
2010–2013	Toulouse	46	(10)
2013-	Stade Français	58	(15)
- Correct as of 11 October 2014

Sylvain Nicolas (born 21 June 1987) is a French rugby union player. His position is flanker and he currently plays for Stade Français in the Top 14. He began his career with hometown club Bourgoin-Jallieu before moving to Stade Toulousain in 2010. In 2013 he signed for Stade Français.
