= Mickaël Ivaldi =

French rugby union player

Mickaël Ivaldi (born 20 February 1990, in La Seyne-sur-Mer) is a French Rugby Union player. His position is Hooker and he currently plays for Montpellier.

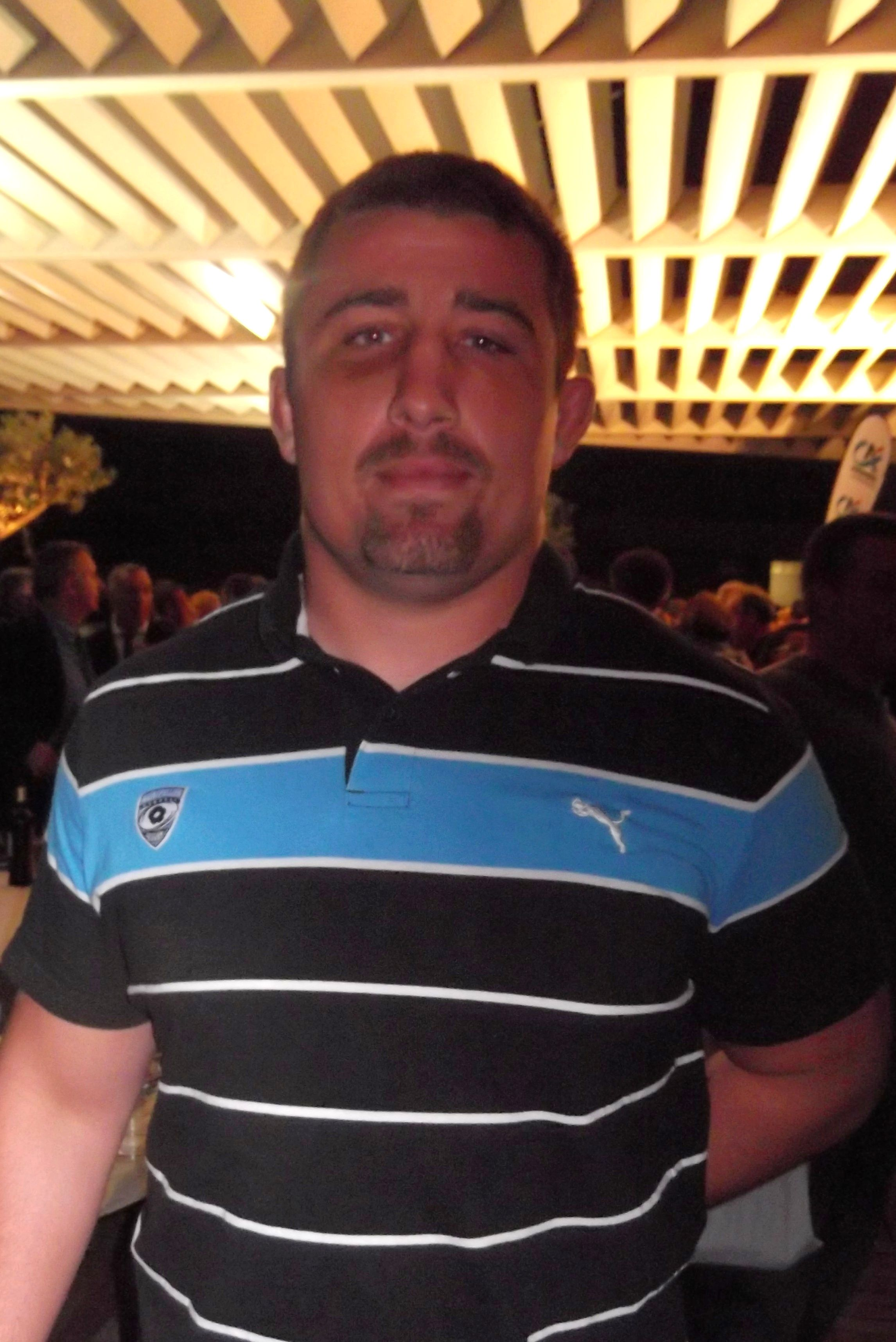
Mickaël Ivaldi.
