= Walter Desmaison =

French professional rugby union player

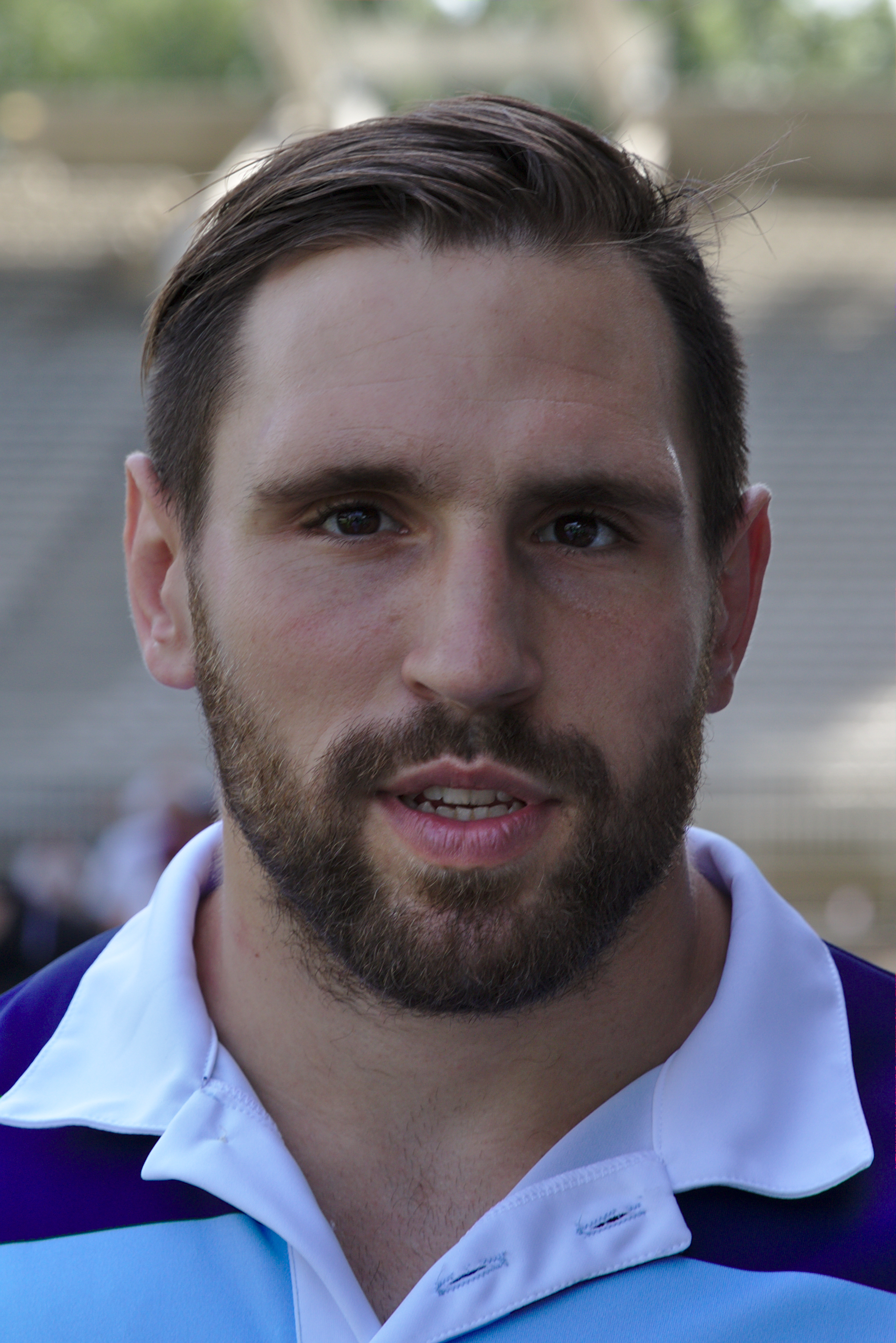
- Born: Walter Desmaison; 18 October 1991 (age 35) Girac, France
- Height: 1.88 m (6 ft 2 in)
- Weight: 114 kg (17 st 13 lb)

Rugby union career
- Position: Prop
Senior career
Years	Team	Apps	(Points)
2010-2013	Bayonne	4	(0)
2013-2015	Racing Métro	9	(0)
2015-17	Grenoble	32	(1)
2017-19	Stade Montois	48	(1)
2019-	SU Agen Lot-et-Garonne	7	(0)
- Correct as of 29 November 2019
International career
Years	Team	Apps	(Points)
2011	France U20	8	(5)

Walter Desmaison (born 18 October 1991 in Girac, France) is a French professional rugby union player. He plays at prop for Racing Métro in the Top 14.
