= Gregory Marmoiton =

- Born: Gregory Marmoiton; 13 September 1990 (age 36)
- Height: 1.86 m (6 ft 1 in)
- Weight: 118 kg (18 st 8 lb)

Rugby union career
- Position: Prop
Senior career
Years	Team	Apps	(Points)
2011-2015	Castres olympique	7	(0)
2015-2016	ROC La Voulte-Valence		
2016-2019	Stade Rodez Aveyron		
2019-2020	Stado Tarbes PR		
2020-	SC Mazamet		
- Correct as of 20 January 2023

Gregory Marmoiton is a French professional rugby union player. He plays at prop for Castres in the Top 14.
