= Tamato Leupolu =

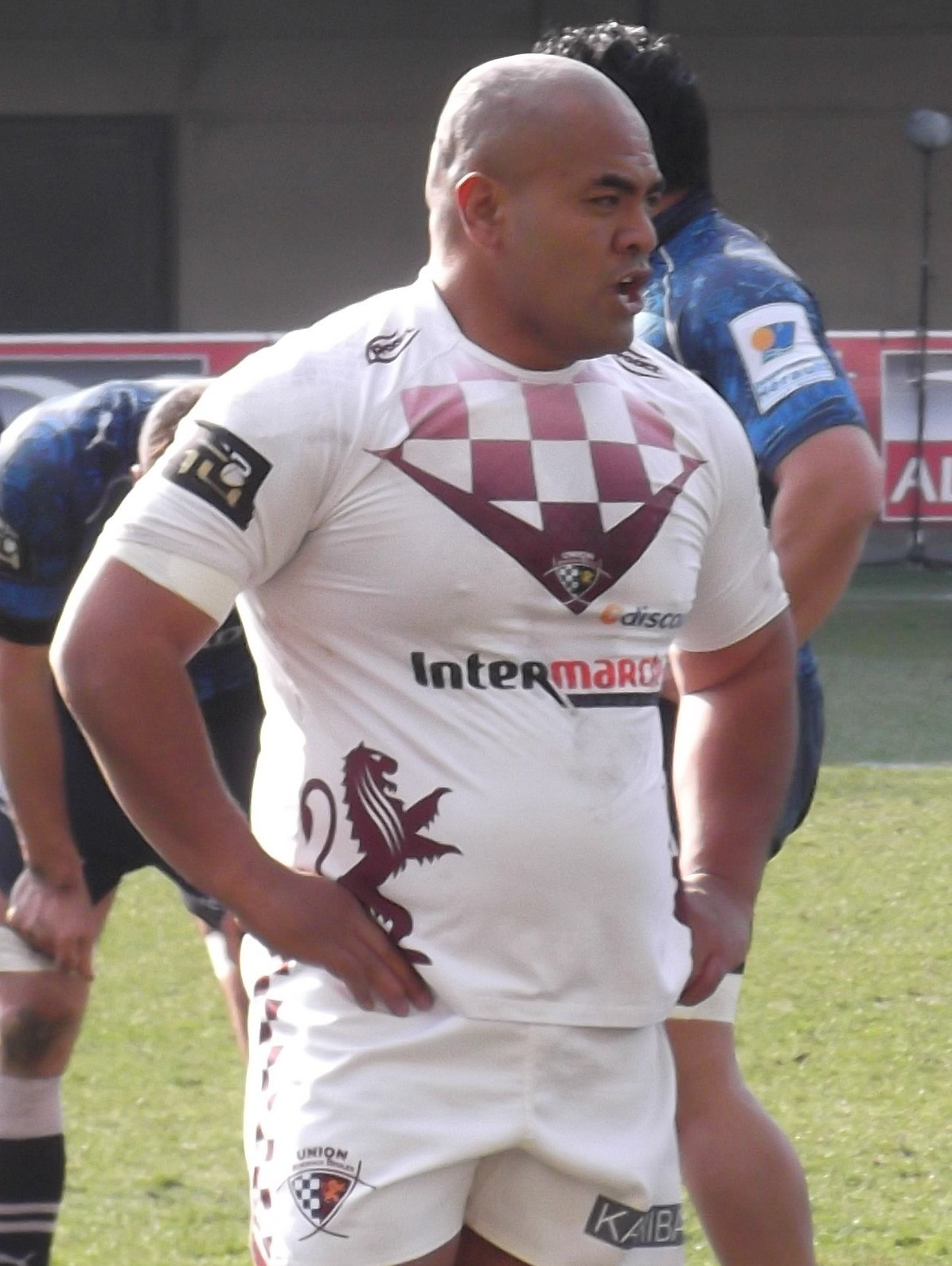
- Leupolu playing for Bordeaux Bègles
- Born: Tamato Samasoni Leupolu; 7 December 1980 (age 45) Auckland, New Zealand
- Height: 6 ft 1 in (1.85 m)
- Weight: 252 lb (114 kg)

Rugby union career
- Position: Prop
Amateur team(s)
Years	Team	Apps	(Points)
2001–2003	Suburbs		
Senior career
Years	Team	Apps	(Points)
2003–2004	RC Orléans		
2004–2011	Stade Rochelais		
2011–2013	Bordeaux-Begles		
2013–	CA Brive		
Provincial / State sides
Years	Team	Apps	(Points)
2001–2003	Auckland	1	(0)
International career
Years	Team	Apps	(Points)
2001–2007	Samoa	15	(5)

Tamato Samasoni Leupolu (born 7 December 1980 in Auckland) is a New Zealand-born Samoan rugby union player. He plays as a prop.

== Career ==
His first international cap for the Manu Samoa was against Ireland, at Lansdowne Road, on 11 November 2001. He was part of the 2003 Rugby World Cup roster, where he played against South Africa, at Brisbane. His last cap was against Japan, at Miyagi, on 16 June 2007.
