= Giorgi Jgenti =

Georgian rugby union player

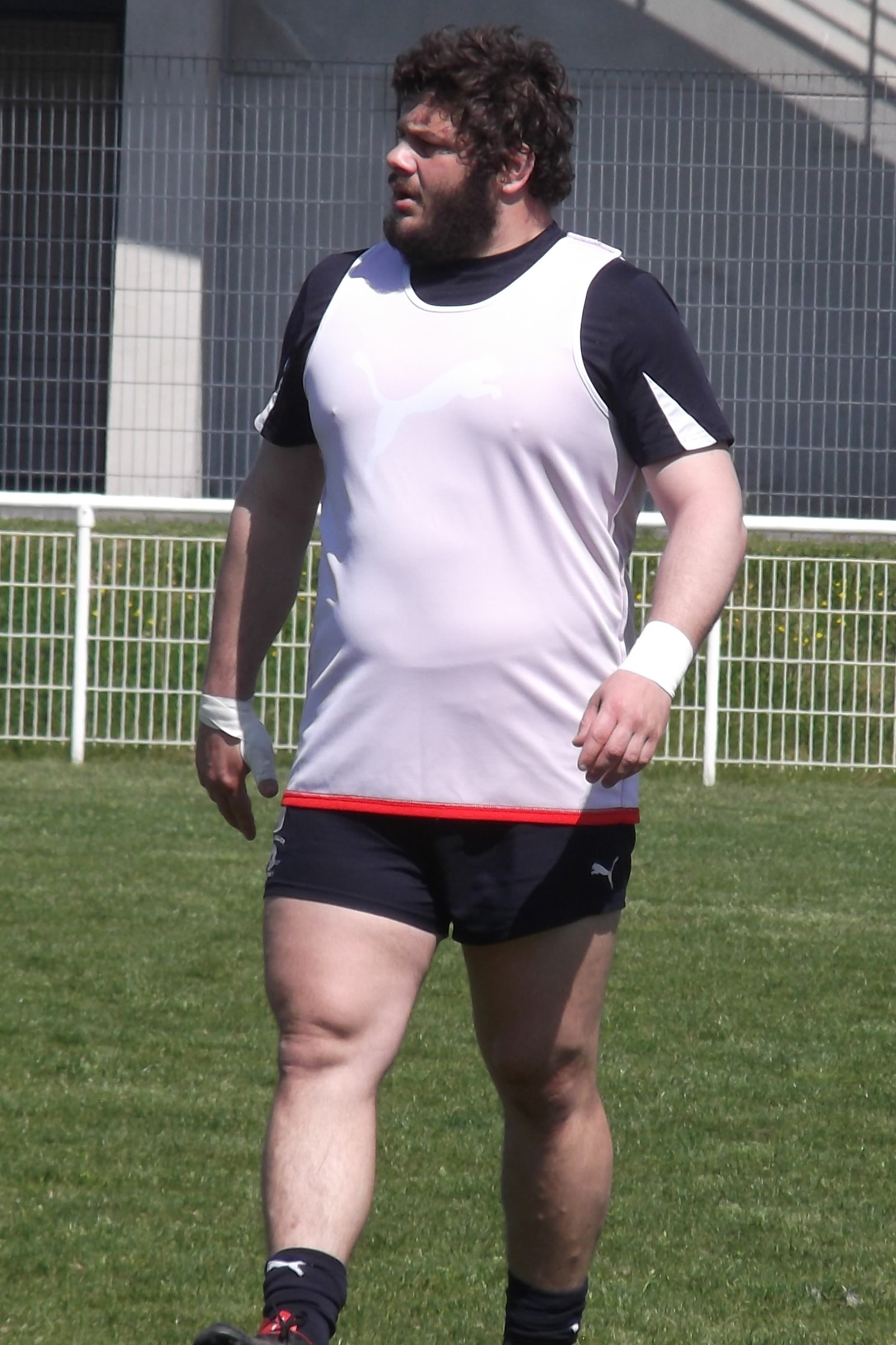
- Born: Giorgi Jgenti; 13 November 1985 (age 41)
- Height: 1.80 m (5 ft 11 in)
- Weight: 124 kg (19 st 7 lb)

Rugby union career
- Position: Prop
Senior career
Years	Team	Apps	(Points)
2007-2009	Aurillac	29	(10)
2009-2010	Oyonnax	27	(0)
2010-2013	Montpellier	69	(10)
2013-2014	Perpignan	23	(0)
2014-2015	Bayonne	9	(0)
2015-	Brive		
- Correct as of 29 November 2014
International career
Years	Team	Apps	(Points)
2007-2011	Georgia	3	(0)

Giorgi Jgenti is a Georgian professional rugby union player. He currently in France for Brive in the Top 14 competition.
