= Girac, Lot =

Girac
- Commune
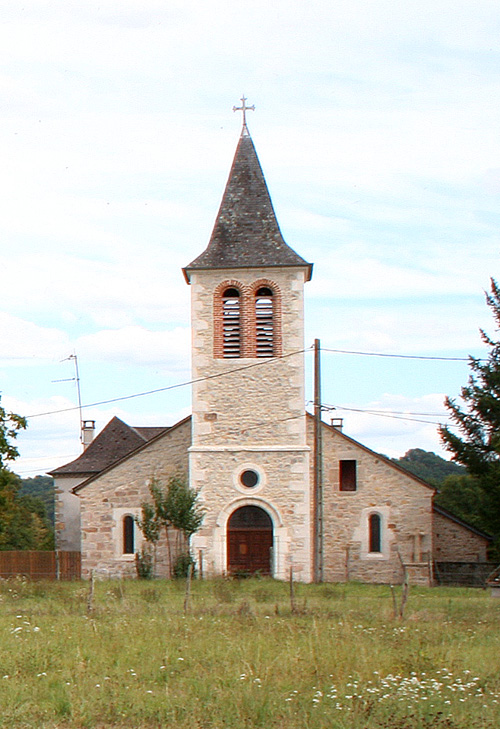
- The church in Girac
- Location of Girac
- Location within France Location within Occitanie
- Coordinates: 44°55′22″N 1°49′10″E
- Country: France
- Region: Occitania
- Department: Lot
- Arrondissement: Figeac
- Canton: Cère et Ségala
- Intercommunality: Causses et Vallée de la Dordogne

Government
  - Mayor (2021–2026): Philippe Boissac
- Area^{1}: 4.40 km^{2} (1.70 sq mi)
- Elevation: 225 m (738 ft)
- Highest elevation: 144 m (472 ft)
- Lowest elevation: 128 m (420 ft)
- Population (2023): 355
  - Density: 80.7/km^{2} (209/sq mi)
- Time zone: UTC+01:00 (CET)
  - Summer (DST): UTC+02:00 (CEST)
- INSEE/Postal code: 46123 /46130
- ^{1} French Land Register data, which excludes lakes, ponds, glaciers > 1 km^{2} (0.386 sq mi or 247 acres) and river estuaries.

Girac (French pronunciation: [ʒiʁak], Occitan pronunciation: [dʒiˈɾak]) is a commune in the Lot department in the administrative region of Occitania, France.

== See also ==
- Communes of the Lot department
