= Jack Whetton =

- Born: Jack Whetton; 24 May 1992 (age 34) Auckland, New Zealand
- Height: 2.00 m (6 ft 7 in)
- Weight: 114 kg (17 st 13 lb)
- School: Rosmini College
- Notable relative(s): Gary Whetton (father); Alan Whetton (uncle); William Whetton (brother)

Rugby union career
- Position: Lock
Senior career
Years	Team	Apps	(Points)
2014-2015	Leicester Tigers	4	(0)
2015–2016	Nevers	17	(35)
2016–2018	Yorkshire Carnegie	39	(20)
2021–2022	Castres	6	(0)
2022–	Colomiers	22	(10)
- Correct as of 7 February 2015
Provincial / State sides
Years	Team	Apps	(Points)
2012	Northland	7	(5)
2013–2014	Auckland	20	(10)
2018–20	Auckland	7	(0)
- Correct as of 19 November 2018
Super Rugby
Years	Team	Apps	(Points)
2014	Brumbies	6	(0)
2018–2020	Highlanders	13	(0)
2021	Waratahs	1	(0)
- Correct as of 25 February 2021

Jack Whetton (born 24 May 1992) is a New Zealand Rugby Union player who currently plays as a lock for Colomiers.

Whetton started out his playing career for North Harbour, playing two years of club rugby there before debuting in the 2012 ITM Cup for Northland. He switched to Auckland for the 2013 season for personal reasons and played 9 matches as his side made the semi-finals of the competition. His performances caught the attention of the Blues Super Rugby franchise who wanted to contract him to their wider training group for the 2013 Super Rugby season. In a controversial move, he turned down their offer and instead signed for the Brumbies in October 2012.

Whetton comes from a family with a rich rugby tradition. His father Gary played 180 games for Auckland and 58 for the All Blacks and is the chairman of the Blues franchise. His uncle Alan also played 65 tests for the All Blacks and spent 12 years with Auckland.

He was eligible to play international rugby for New Zealand, England and Australia. He qualifies for Australia through his grandfather.

On 2 December 2014, Whetton signed a short-term deal with Leicester Tigers until the end of the season. On 5 June 2015, Whetton signed for third division French club USO Nevers in Federale 1 during the 2015-16 season. Whetton returned to England to sign for Yorkshire Carnegie in the RFU Championship on a two-year contract, where he found his level playing his best rugby.
