= Aliki Fakate =

French rugby union lock

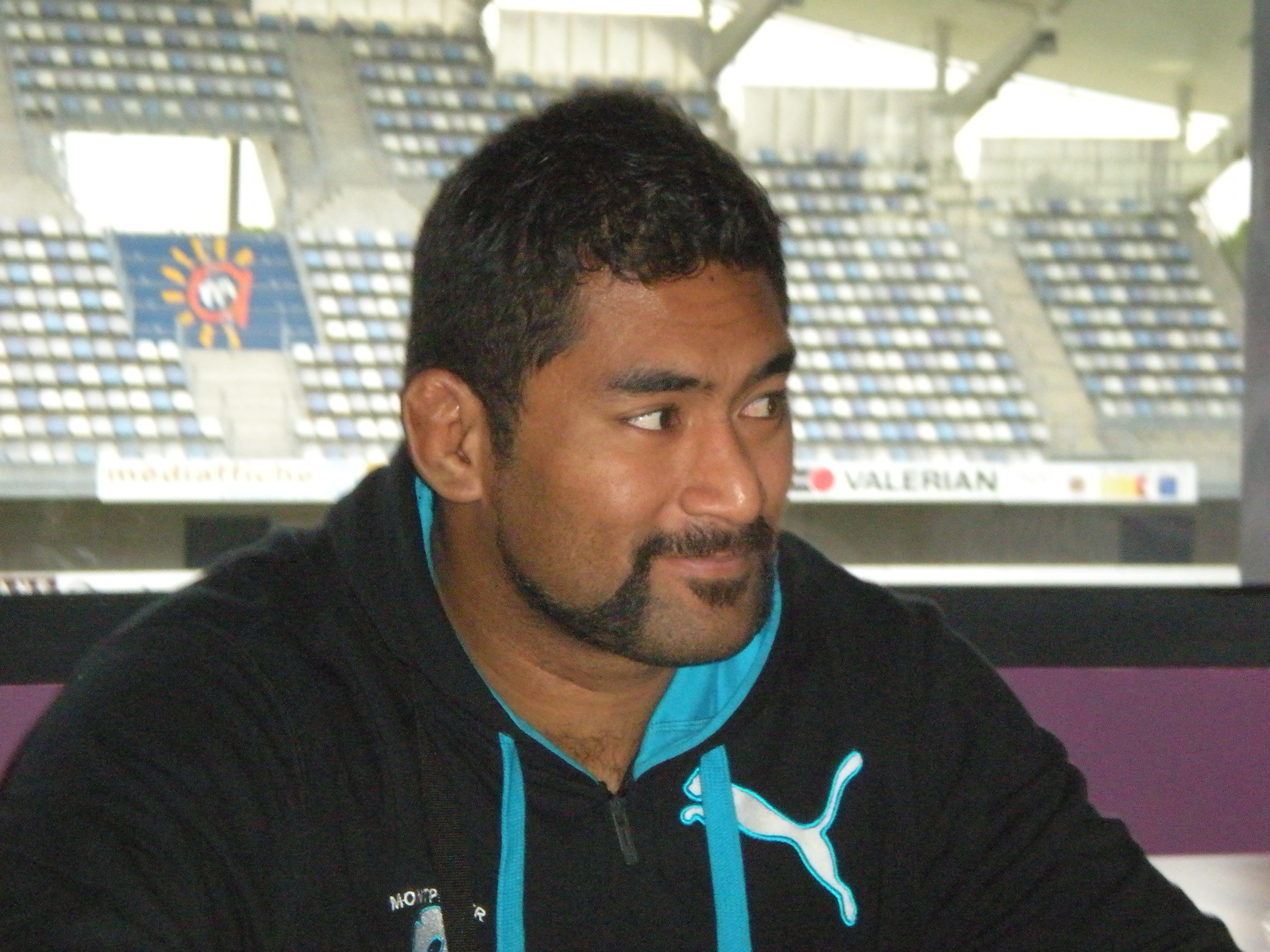
- Born: Alikisio Fakate; 4 September 1985 (age 41)
- Height: 2.03 m (6 ft 8 in)
- Weight: 130 kg (290 lb)

Rugby union career
- Position: Lock
Senior career
| Years | Team | Apps | (Points) |
| 2007-2010 | Lyon OU | 42 | (5) |
| 2010-Present | Montpellier | | |
International career
| Years | Team | Apps | (Points) |
| | France A | 3 | (0) |

Aliki Fakate (born 4 September 1985) is a French rugby union lock.

Born at Nouméa, New Caledonia, he plays for Montpellier, where he moved from Pro D2 club Lyon OU. He debuted for Lyon on 27 October 2007 against Racing Metro.

Fakate also represented France A against Italy A in the Nations Cup on 12 June 2009.
