= Arthur Chollon =

French rugby union player

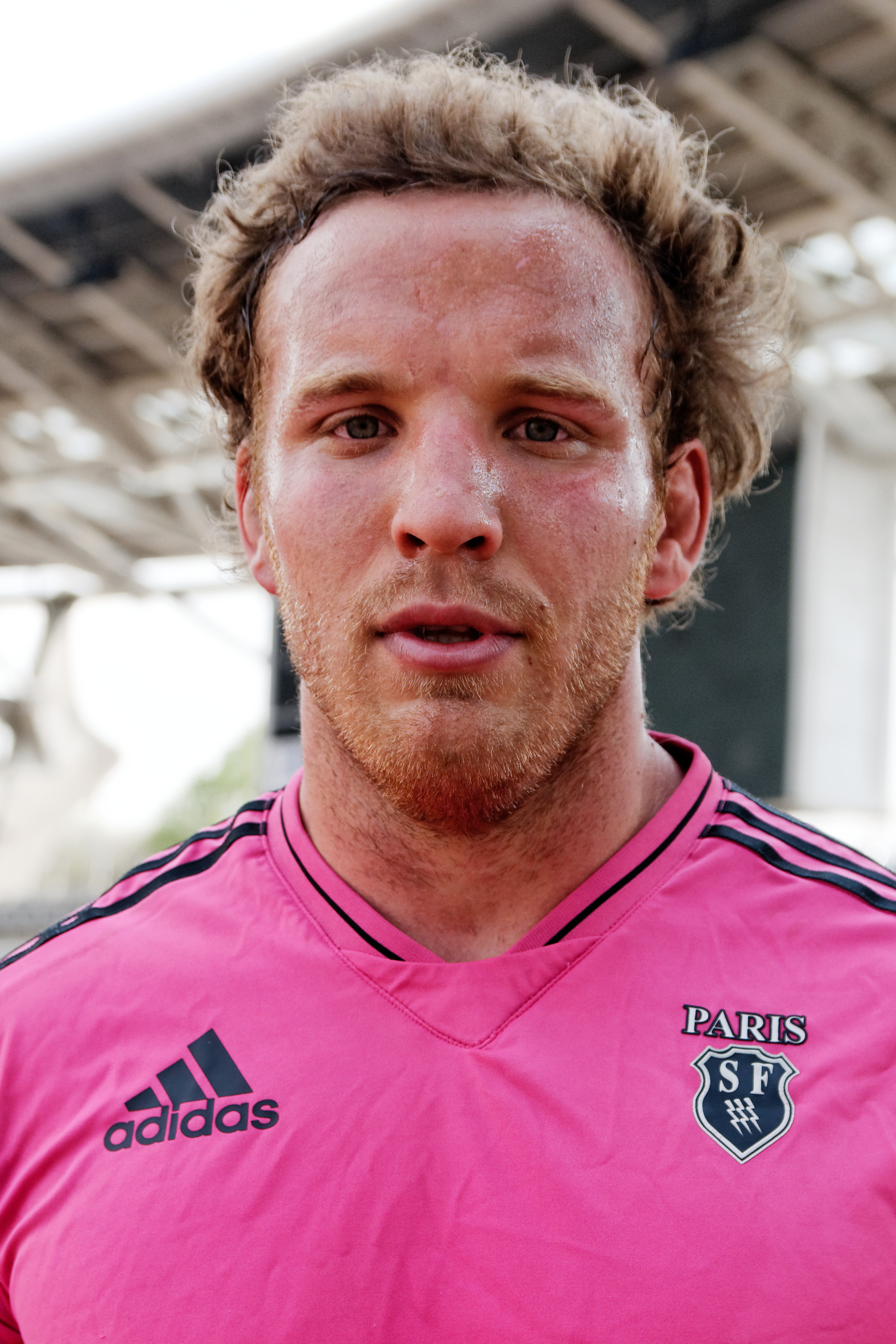
- Born: 15 December 1988 (age 37) Bordeaux, France
- Height: 1.88 m (6 ft 2 in)
- Weight: 100 kg (15 st 10 lb)

Rugby union career
- Position: Flanker
Senior career
| Years | Team | Apps | (Points) |
| 2007–2011 | Bordeaux Bègles | 43 | (25) |
| 2011– | Stade Français | 6 | (0) |
- Correct as of 10 November 2012

Arthur Chollon (born 15 December 1988) is a French rugby union player. His position is Flanker and he currently plays for Stade Français in the Top 14. He began his career with home-town club Bordeaux Bègles before moving to Stade Français in 2011.
