= Camille Gérondeau =

French rugby union player

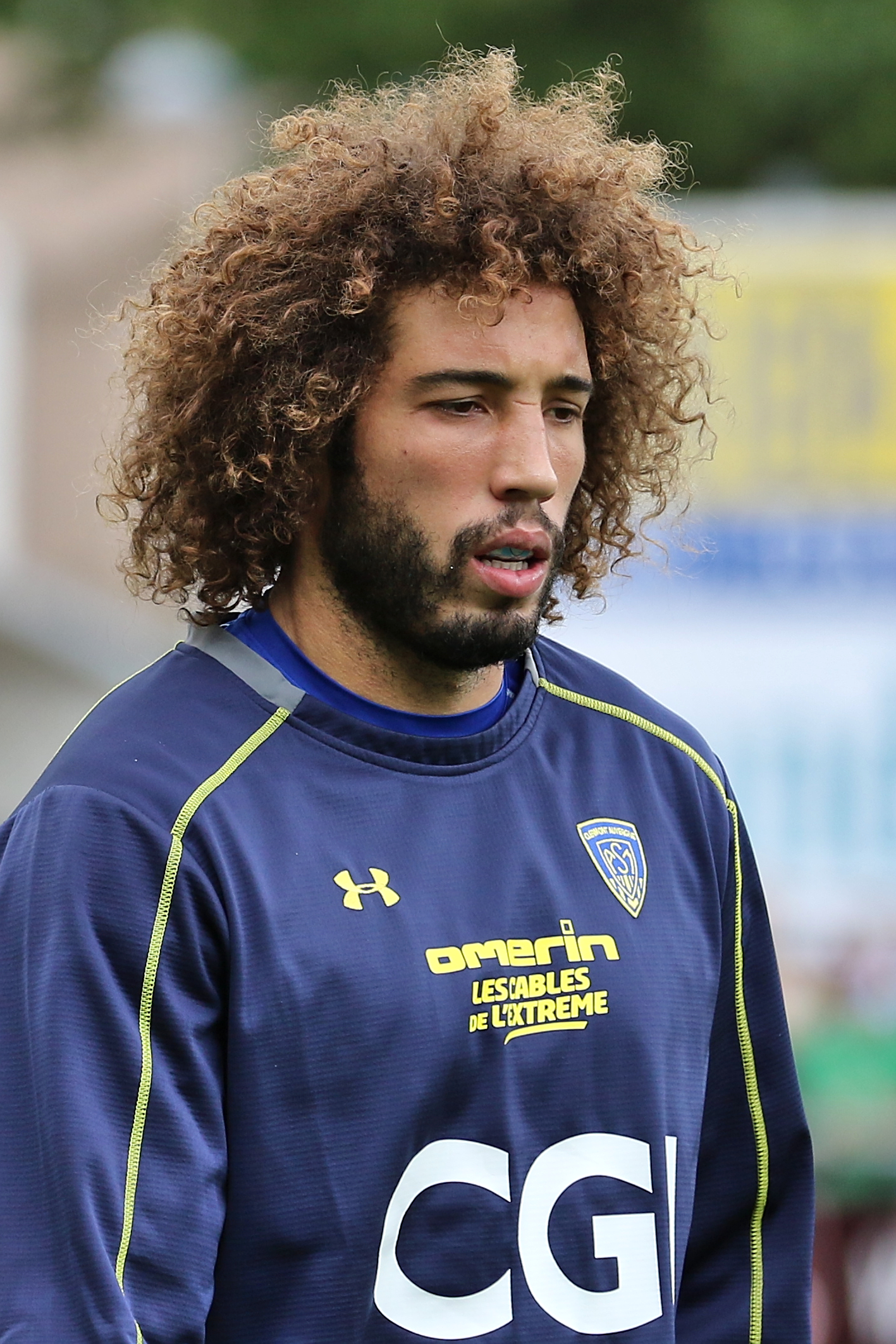
- Gérondeau in 2015
- Born: Camille Gérondeau; 12 March 1988 (age 38) Caudéran, France
- Height: 1.94 m (6 ft 4 in)
- Weight: 114 kg (17 st 13 lb)

Rugby union career
- Position(s): Flanker, Number 8
Senior career
Years	Team	Apps	(Points)
2010-2012	Béziers	50	(30)
2012-2015	Racing Métro	71	(25)
2015-18	Clermont	50	(30)
2018-	Castres Olympique	24	(10)
- Correct as of 8 December 2019

Camille Gérondeau (born 12 March 1988) is a French professional rugby union player. He plays at flanker for Clermont in the Top 14 since 2015. He was born in Caudéran in Bordeaux.
