= Justin Purll =

- Born: Justin Purll; 13 November 1979 (age 47) Newport, Australia
- Height: 1.97 m (6 ft 6 in)
- Weight: 110 kg (17 st)

Rugby union career
- Position: Lock
Senior career
Years	Team	Apps	(Points)
2001–2009	Calvisano		
2009–2010	Cavalieri Prato		
2010–2013	Bordeaux		
2013–	Perpignan		

Justin Purll is an Australian rugby union player for USA Perpignan in the Top 14.

== Career ==
From 2001 until 2009, he played in Italy for Calvisano, where he played 27 games in the Heineken Cup, making him an experienced statesmen for the club. With Calvisano experiencing financial problems, he left the club to join Cavalieri Prato in 2009. After playing one season and making 18 appearances for the club, he headed to France to join Union Bordeaux Bègles in the Pro D2. Now he plays in USA Perpignan.
