= William Whetton =

- Born: William Whetton; 10 June 1989 (age 37)
- Height: 1.93 m (6 ft 4 in)
- Weight: 113 kg (17 st 11 lb)

Rugby union career
- Position: Number 8
Senior career
Years	Team	Apps	(Points)
2014-2015	Castres	7	(0)
2015-17	Brive	18	(5)
2017-	Albi	68	(45)
- Correct as of 5 December 2019
Provincial / State sides
Years	Team	Apps	(Points)
2010–2011	North Harbour	0	(0)
2012–2014	Northland	10	(0)

William Whetton is a New Zealand rugby union player. He currently plays at number 8 for Castres in the Top 14. He is the son of ex-All Black lock Gary Whetton and his brother Jack is also a professional rugby player.
