= Thomas Sanchou =

French rugby union player

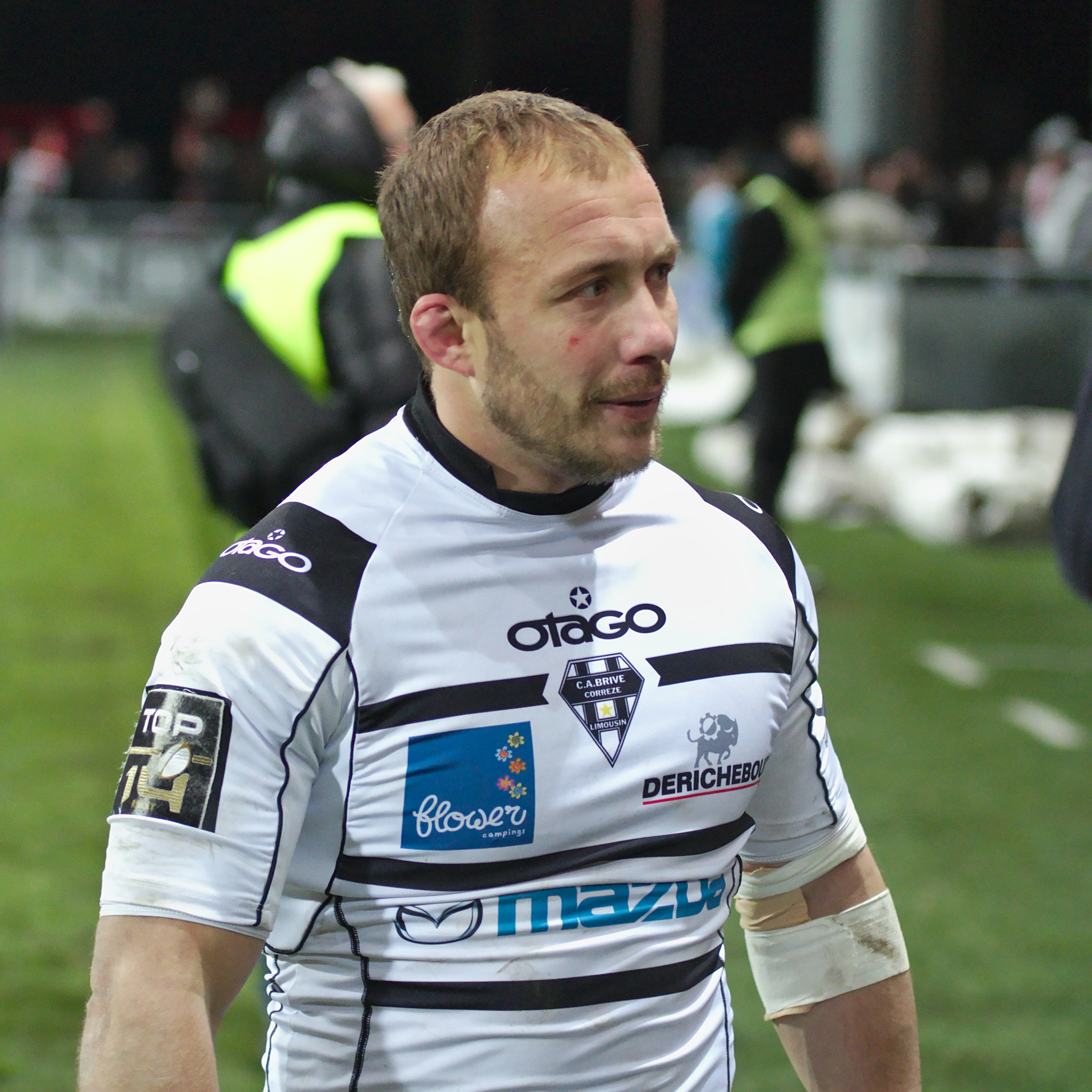
- Born: 23 February 1981 (age 45) Pau, France
- Height: 1.77 m (5 ft 9 1/2 in)
- Weight: 78 kg (12 st 4 lb)

Rugby union career
- Position(s): Centre, Fly-half
Senior career
Years	Team	Apps	(Points)
2005–2008	SC Albi	87	(48)
2008–	Castres Olympique	68	(25)
- Correct as of 19 November 2012

Thomas Sanchou (born 23 November 1981) is a French rugby union player. His position is Centre or Fly-half and he currently plays for Castres Olympique in the Top 14. He began his career with SC Albi, before moving to Castres Olympique in 2008.
