= Lucas Dupont =

French rugby union player

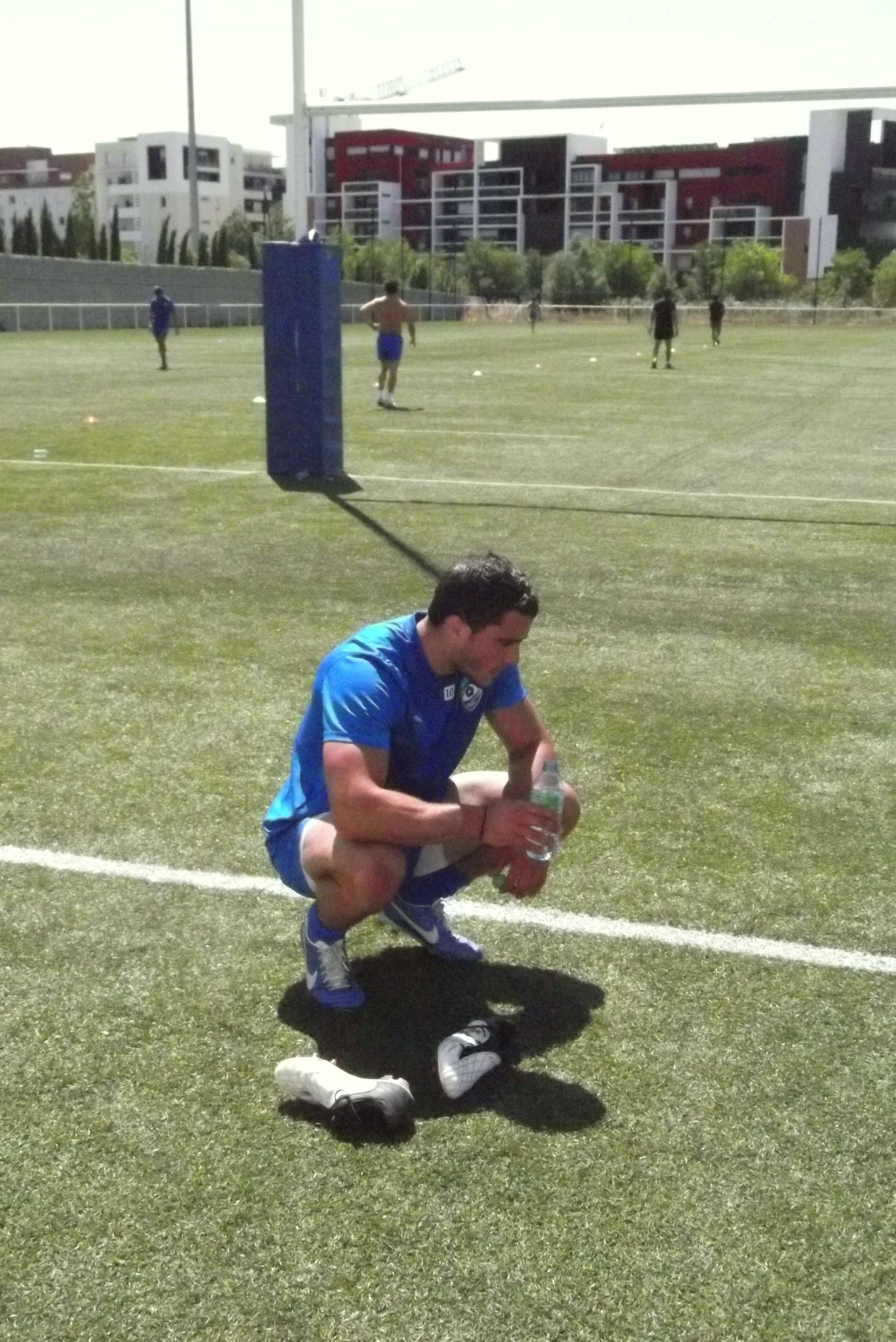
- Born: 19 March 1990 (age 36) Échirolles, France
- Height: 1.78 m (5 ft 10 in)
- Weight: 82 kg (12 st 13 lb)

Rugby union career
- Position: Wing
Senior career
Years	Team	Apps	(Points)
2009–2013	FC Grenoble	62	(100)
2013-15	Montpellier Herault Rugby	33	(25)
2015-	FC Grenoble	78	(70)
- Correct as of 29 December 2019

Lucas Dupont (born 19 March 1990 in Échirolles) is a French rugby union player. His position is Wing and he currently plays for FC Grenoble in the Rugby Pro D2.
