= Thomas Bianchin =

French rugby union player

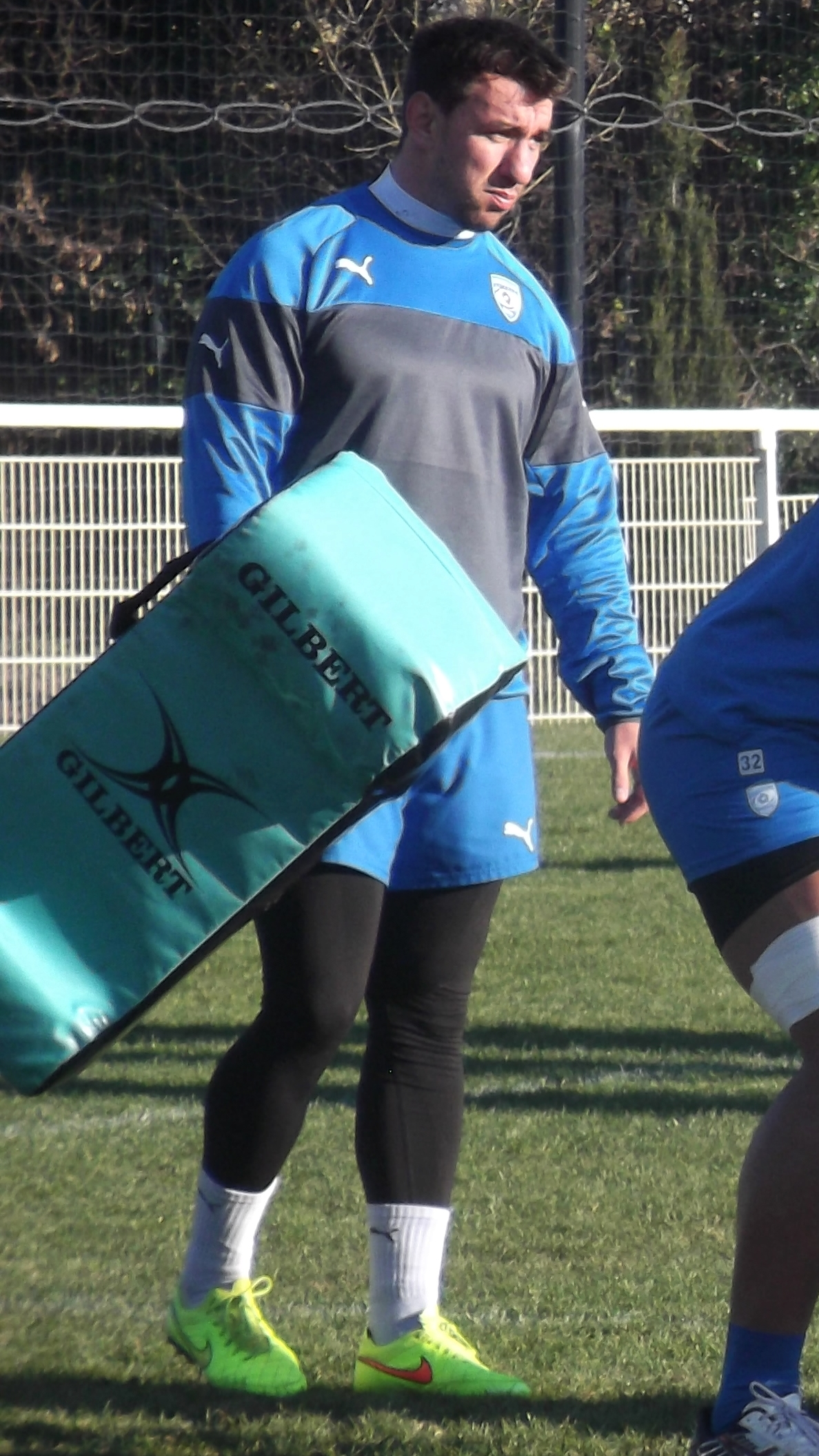
- Born: 11 August 1987 (age 39) Albertville, France
- Height: 1.83 m (6 ft 0 in)
- Weight: 105 kg (16 st 7 lb)

Rugby union career
- Position: Hooker
Senior career
Years	Team	Apps	(Points)
2008–2011	FC Grenoble	59	(60)
2011–2013	Racing Métro 92	55	(0)
2013-15	Montpellier HR	21	(0)
2015-18	Section Paloise	40	(15)
- Correct as of 18 December 2019

Thomas Bianchin (born 11 August 1987) is a French rugby union player. His position is Hooker and he formerly played for Section Paloise in the Top 14. He began his career with FC Grenoble in the Pro D2 before moving to Racing Métro 92 in 2011 and then to Montpellier in 2013.
