= Jonathan Pélissié =

France international rugby union player (born 1988)

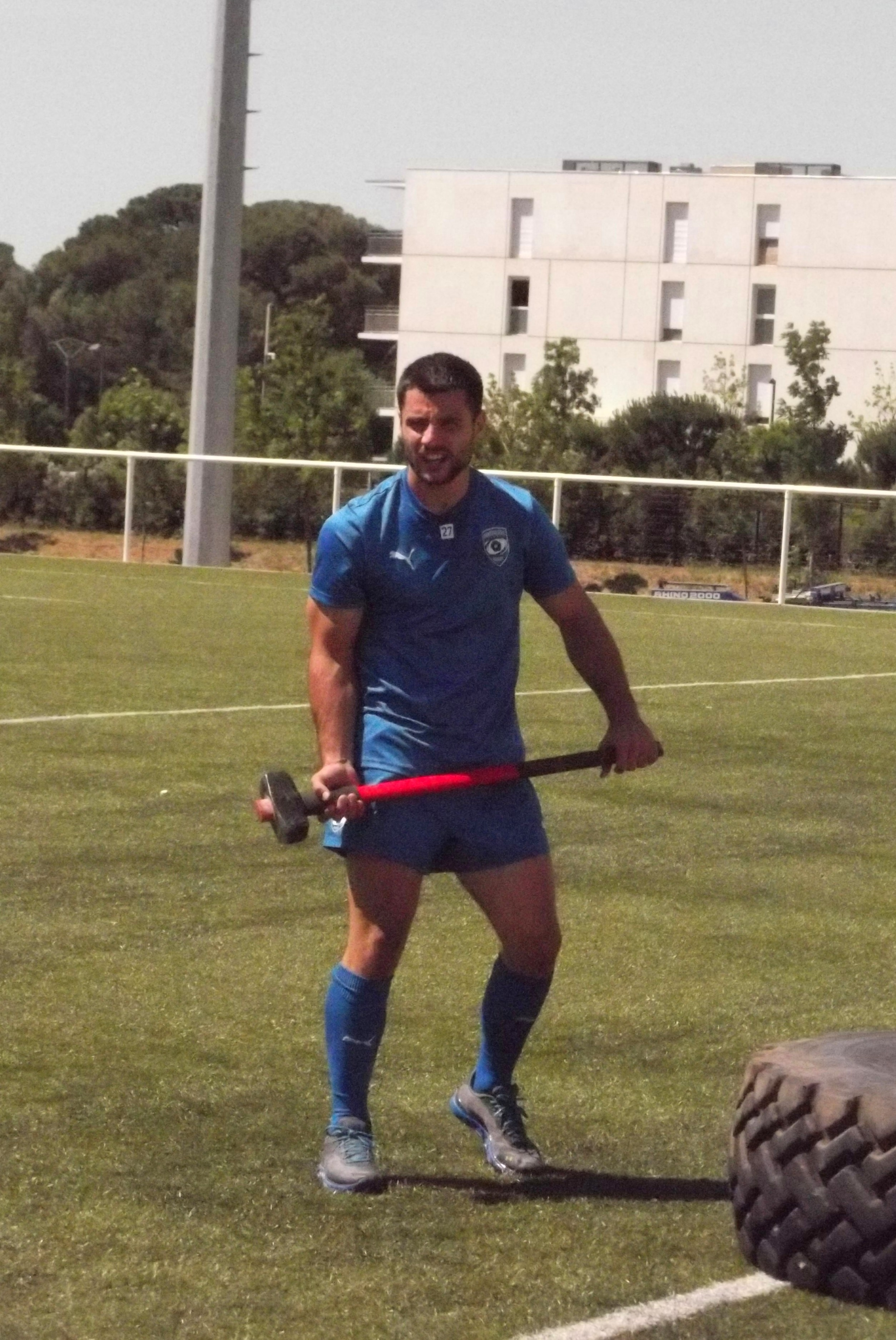
- Born: 6 June 1988 (age 38) Aubergenville, France
- Height: 5 ft 10 in (178 cm)
- Weight: 183 lb (83 kg)

Rugby union career
- Position: Scrum-half
International career
Years	Team	Apps	(Points)
2013	France	1	(0)

Jonathan Pélissié (born 6 June 1988) is a French former international rugby union player.

Pélissié, who was born in Aubergenville, competed in the Top 14 for CA Brive, FC Grenoble, Montpellier, RC Toulon and Lyon OU. In 2013, Pélissié earned a Test cap for France in a Test against Tonga in Le Havre, coming on as a second-half substitute for scrum-half Morgan Parra. He finished his career after the 2022–23 Top 14 season.

== See also ==
- List of France national rugby union players
